= Lists of anime episodes =

This is a list of lists of anime episodes.

== 0–9 ==
- List of 2.5 Dimensional Seduction episodes
- List of 07-Ghost episodes
- List of 86 episodes
- List of The 100 Girlfriends Who Really, Really, Really, Really, Really Love You episodes
- List of 3000 Leagues in Search of Mother episodes

== A ==
- List of A Channel episodes
- List of A3! episodes
- List of Accel World episodes
- List of Ace Attorney episodes
- List of Ace of Diamond episodes
- List of After War Gundam X episodes
- List of Ah My Buddha episodes
- List of Ai Yori Aoshi episodes
- List of Aikatsu Friends! episodes
- List of Aikatsu Stars! episodes
- List of Aikatsu! episodes
- List of Aim for the Ace! episodes
- List of Air episodes
- List of Air Gear episodes
- List of Ajin: Demi-Human episodes
- List of Akagi episodes
- List of Akame ga Kill! episodes
- List of Akaneiro ni Somaru Saka episodes
- List of Akazukin Chacha episodes
- List of AKB0048 episodes
- List of Akikan! episodes
- List of Aldnoah.Zero episodes
- List of Allison & Lillia episodes
- List of Altair: A Record of Battles episodes
- List of Amagami SS episodes
- List of The Ambition of Oda Nobuna episodes
- List of The Ancient Magus' Bride episodes
- List of Angel Beats! episodes
- List of Angel Heart episodes
- List of Angel Links episodes
- List of Angelic Layer episodes
- List of Angels of Death episodes
- List of Anne of Green Gables (1979 TV series) episodes
- List of The Apothecary Diaries episodes
- List of Aquarion Evol episodes
- List of Arakawa Under the Bridge episodes
- List of Area 88 episodes
- List of Aria episodes
- List of Aria the Scarlet Ammo episodes
- List of Arifureta episodes
- List of Armored Trooper VOTOMS episodes
- List of Around the World with Willy Fog episodes
- List of Ascendance of a Bookworm episodes
- List of Assassination Classroom episodes
- List of Assassins Pride episodes
- List of Astro Boy (1963 TV series) episodes
- List of Astro Boy (1980 TV series) episodes
- List of Astro Boy (2003 TV series) episodes
- List of Asura Cryin' episodes
- List of Attack on Titan episodes
- List of Azumanga Daioh episodes

== B ==
- List of B Gata H Kei episodes
- List of B-Daman Crossfire episodes
- List of B-Daman Fireblast episodes
- List of Baby Steps episodes
- List of Baccano! episodes
- List of Baka and Test episodes
- List of Bakugan: Battle Planet episodes
- List of Bakuman episodes
- List of Banana Fish episodes
- List of BanG Dream! episodes
- List of Bartender episodes
- List of Basilisk episodes
- List of Basquash! episodes
- List of Bastard!! episodes
- List of Battle B-Daman episodes
- List of Beastars episodes
- List of Beck: Mongolian Chop Squad episodes
- List of Beelzebub episodes
- List of Berserk (1997 TV series) episodes
- List of Best Student Council episodes
- List of original Beyblade episodes
- List of Beyblade Burst episodes
- List of Beyblade X episodes
- List of Beyblade: Metal Saga episodes
- List of Beyond the Boundary episodes
- List of The Big O episodes
- List of Big Windup! episodes
- List of Birdy the Mighty: Decode episodes
- List of Black Bullet episodes
- List of Black Butler episodes
- List of Black Cat episodes
- List of Black Clover episodes
- List of Black Jack episodes
- List of Black Lagoon episodes
- List of Black Rock Shooter episodes
- List of Blade of the Immortal episodes
- List of Blassreiter episodes
- List of Blood Blockade Battlefront episodes
- List of Blood Lad episodes
- List of Blood-C episodes
- List of Blood+ episodes
- List of Blue Box episodes
- List of Blue Dragon episodes
- List of Blue Drop episodes
- List of Blue Exorcist episodes
- List of Blue Lock episodes
- List of Bobobo-bo Bo-bobo episodes
- List of Bocchi the Rock! episodes
- List of Bodacious Space Pirates episodes
- List of Bofuri episodes
- List of Bokurano episodes
- List of Boogiepop media
- List of Book Girl episodes
- List of Brain Powerd episodes
- List of Brave Witches episodes
- List of Btooom! episodes
- List of Buddy Complex episodes
- List of Bungo Stray Dogs episodes
- List of Burst Angel episodes
- List of Buso Renkin episodes
- List of Busou Shinki episodes
- List of By the Grace of the Gods episodes

== C ==
- List of Call of the Night episodes
- List of Canaan episodes
- List of Candy Candy episodes
- List of Canvas 2: Niji-iro no Sketch episodes
- List of Captain Tsubasa episodes
- List of Cardcaptor Sakura episodes
- List of Cardcaptor Sakura: Clear Card episodes
- List of Cardfight!! Vanguard episodes
- List of The Case Study of Vanitas episodes
- List of Casshern Sins episodes
- List of Cat's Eye episodes
- List of Cautious Hero episodes
- List of Ceres, Celestial Legend episodes
- List of A Certain Magical Index episodes
- List of A Certain Scientific Railgun episodes
- List of Chainsaw Man episodes
- List of Chaos;Child episodes
- List of Chaos;Head episodes
- List of Charlotte episodes
- List of Chibi Maruko-chan episodes
- List of Chihayafuru episodes
- List of Chivalry of a Failed Knight episodes
- List of Chobits episodes
- List of Chōgattai Majutsu Robo Ginguiser episodes
- List of Chrome Shelled Regios episodes
- List of Chrono Crusade episodes
- List of Clamp School Detectives episodes
- List of Clannad episodes
- List of Classroom of the Elite episodes
- List of Claymore episodes
- List of Cobra the Animation episodes
- List of Code Geass episodes
- List of La Corda d'Oro episodes
- List of Corpse Princess episodes
- List of Cowboy Bebop episodes
- List of Crayon Shin-chan episodes
- List of Crayon Shin-chan episodes (1992–2001)
- List of Crayon Shin-chan episodes (2002–2011)
- List of Crayon Shin-chan episodes (2012–2021)
- List of Cromartie High School episodes
- List of Cross Ange episodes
- List of Cross Game episodes
- List of Crush Gear Nitro episodes
- List of Crush Gear Turbo episodes
- List of Cute High Earth Defense Club Love! episodes
- List of Cutie Honey episodes
- List of Cyborg 009 (1968) episodes
- List of Cyborg 009: The Cyborg Soldier episodes

== D ==
- List of Da Capo episodes
- List of D.Gray-man episodes
- List of D.N.Angel episodes
- List of Da Capo II episodes
- List of Dagashi Kashi episodes
- List of Daily Lives of High School Boys episodes
- List of Danball Senki episodes
- List of Dance in the Vampire Bund episodes
- List of Dandadan episodes
- List of Danganronpa 3: The End of Hope's Peak High School episodes
- List of Danganronpa: The Animation episodes
- List of The Dangers in My Heart episodes
- List of Darker than Black episodes
- List of Darker than Black: Gemini of the Meteor episodes
- List of Darling in the Franxx episodes
- List of Date A Live episodes
- List of Dear Brother episodes
- List of Delicious in Dungeon episodes
- List of Demon King Daimao episodes
- List of Demon Lord, Retry! episodes
- List of Demon Slayer: Kimetsu no Yaiba episodes
- List of Den-noh Coil episodes
- List of Descending Stories: Showa Genroku Rakugo Shinju episodes
- List of Detective School Q episodes
- List of The Devil Is a Part-Timer! episodes
- List of Devil May Cry episodes
- List of Devil Survivor 2: The Animation episodes
- List of Devilman episodes
- List of Di Gi Charat episodes
- List of Diabolik Lovers episodes
- List of Digimon Adventure (1999 TV series) episodes
- List of Digimon Adventure (2020 TV series) episodes
- List of Digimon Adventure 02 episodes
- List of Digimon Beatbreak episodes
- List of Digimon Data Squad episodes
- List of Digimon Frontier episodes
- List of Digimon Fusion episodes
- List of Digimon Ghost Game episodes
- List of Digimon Tamers episodes
- List of Digimon Universe: App Monsters episodes
- List of Dinosaur King episodes
- List of Dirty Pair episodes
- List of The Disastrous Life of Saiki K. episodes
- List of Do You Love Your Mom and Her Two-Hit Multi-Target Attacks? episodes
- List of Dog Days episodes
- List of Dōjin Work episodes
- List of Doraemon (1979 TV series) episodes (1979–1986)
- List of Doraemon (1979 TV series) episodes (1987–2005)
- List of Doraemon (2005 TV series) episodes (2015–2024)
- List of Doraemon (2005 TV series) episodes (2025–present)
- List of Dorohedoro episodes
- List of Dororo (2019 TV series) episodes
- List of Dororon Enma-kun episodes
- List of Dr. Slump episodes
- List of Dr. Slump Arale-chan episodes
- List of Dr. Stone episodes
- List of Dragon Ball Z episodes
- List of Dragonaut: The Resonance episodes
- List of Dramatical Murder episodes
- List of The Duke of Death and His Maid episodes
- List of Durarara!! episodes

== E ==
- List of The Earl and the Fairy episodes
- List of Eden of the East episodes
- List of Edens Zero episodes
- List of Ef episodes
- List of El Cazador de la Bruja episodes
- List of Elemental Gelade episodes
- List of Elfen Lied episodes
- List of The Eminence in Shadow episodes
- List of Emma episodes
- List of Encouragement of Climb episodes
- List of Ergo Proxy episodes
- List of Erin episodes
- List of Eureka Seven episodes
- List of Eureka Seven: AO episodes
- List of Excel Saga episodes
- List of Eyeshield 21 episodes

== F ==
- List of Fafner in the Azure episodes
- List of Fairy Gone episodes
- List of Fairy Tail episodes
- List of Fairy Tail: 100 Years Quest episodes
- List of The Familiar of Zero episodes
- List of The Faraway Paladin episodes
- List of Fate/Apocrypha episodes
- List of Fate/Extra Last Encore episodes
- List of Fate/Grand Order – Absolute Demonic Front: Babylonia episodes
- List of Fate/kaleid liner Prisma Illya episodes
- List of Fate/Stay Night episodes
- List of Fate/Stay Night: Unlimited Blade Works episodes
- List of Fate/Zero episodes
- List of The File of Young Kindaichi episodes
- List of Fire Force episodes
- List of Fist of the Blue Sky episodes
- List of Fist of the North Star episodes
- List of Flame of Recca episodes
- List of FLCL episodes
- List of Flip Flappers episodes
- List of Food Wars! Shokugeki no Soma episodes
- List of Free! episodes
- List of Freezing episodes
- List of Frieren episodes
- List of The Fruit of Grisaia episodes
- List of The Fuccons episodes
- List of Full Metal Panic! episodes
- List of Full Metal Panic? Fumoffu episodes
- List of Full Moon o Sagashite episodes
- List of Fullmetal Alchemist episodes
- List of Fullmetal Alchemist: Brotherhood episodes
- List of Fushigi Yûgi episodes
- List of Future Boy Conan episodes
- List of Future Card Buddyfight episodes
- List of Future Diary episodes
- List of Future GPX Cyber Formula episodes
- List of Fuuto PI episodes

== G ==
- List of Ga-Rei: Zero episodes
- List of Gaiking: Legend of Daiku-Maryu episodes
- List of Gakuen Alice episodes
- List of Galaxy Angel episodes
- List of Galaxy Express 999 episodes
- List of Gankutsuou episodes
- List of Gantz episodes
- List of Gargoyle of Yoshinaga House media
- List of Garo: The Animation episodes
- List of Gatchaman Crowds episodes
- List of Gate episodes
- List of Gate Keepers episodes
- List of GeGeGe no Kitarō episodes
- List of Generator Gawl episodes
- List of Genesis of Aquarion episodes
- List of Genshiken episodes
- List of GetBackers episodes
- List of Ghost Hound episodes
- List of Ghost Hunt episodes
- List of Ghost in the Shell: Arise – Alternative Architecture episodes
- List of Ghost in the Shell: SAC 2045 episodes
- List of Ghost in the Shell: Stand Alone Complex episodes
- List of Ghost Stories (2000 TV series) episodes
- List of Ginban Kaleidoscope episodes
- List of Gintama episodes
- List of The Girl Who Leapt Through Space episodes
- List of Girlfriend, Girlfriend episodes
- List of Girls und Panzer episodes
- List of Goblin Slayer episodes
- List of Gokusen episodes
- List of Golden Kamuy episodes
- List of Golden Time episodes
- List of Golgo 13 episodes
- List of Gosick episodes
- List of Grand Blue Dreaming episodes
- List of Gravion episodes
- List of Great Pretender episodes
- List of Great Teacher Onizuka episodes
- List of Guilty Crown episodes
- List of Guin Saga episodes
- List of Gun X Sword episodes
- List of Gundam Build Fighters episodes
- List of Gundam Build Fighters Try episodes
- List of Gundam Reconguista in G episodes
- List of Gungrave episodes
- List of Gunslinger Girl episodes
- List of Gurren Lagann episodes
- List of Guyver episodes

== H ==
- List of Himitsu no AiPri episodes
- List of H2O: Footprints in the Sand episodes
- List of .hack//Legend of the Twilight episodes
- List of .hack//Sign episodes
- List of Haganai episodes
- List of Haibane Renmei episodes
- List of Haikyu!! episodes
- List of Hajime no Ippo episodes
- List of Hamatora: The Animation episodes
- List of Hamtaro episodes
- List of Hana no Ko Lunlun episodes
- List of Hanasakeru Seishōnen episodes
- List of Hanasaku Iroha episodes
- List of Hanebado! episodes
- List of Haruka Nogizaka's Secret episodes
- List of Harukanaru Toki no Naka de Hachiyō Shō episodes
- List of Hayate the Combat Butler episodes
- List of Heat Guy J episodes
- List of Heaven's Lost Property episodes
- List of Heavy Object episodes
- List of Hell Girl episodes
- List of Hellsing episodes
- List of Hensuki episodes
- List of Hero Bank episodes
- List of Heroic Age episodes
- List of Heroman episodes
- List of Hetalia: Axis Powers episodes
- List of Hiatari Ryōkō! episodes
- List of Hidamari Sketch episodes
- List of High School! Kimengumi episodes
- List of Highschool of the Dead episodes
- List of Higurashi When They Cry episodes
- List of Hikari no Densetsu episodes
- List of Hikaru no Go episodes
- List of Himouto! Umaru-chan episodes
- List of Hinomaru Sumo episodes
- List of Hitohira episodes
- List of Honey and Clover episodes
- List of The Honor Student at Magic High School episodes
- List of Horizon in the Middle of Nowhere episodes
- List of Hoshizora e Kakaru Hashi episodes
- List of How a Realist Hero Rebuilt the Kingdom episodes
- List of Hozuki's Coolheadedness episodes
- List of Hug! Pretty Cure episodes
- List of Hundred episodes
- List of Hunter × Hunter (2011 TV series) episodes
- List of Hunter × Hunter (1999 TV series) episodes
- List of Hyakka Ryōran Samurai Girls episodes
- List of Hyouka episodes
- List of Hyperdimension Neptunia: The Animation episodes

== I ==
- List of Idol Time PriPara episodes
- List of Idolish7 episodes
- List of The Idolmaster episodes
- List of The Idolmaster Cinderella Girls episodes
- List of IGPX episodes
- List of Ikki Tousen episodes
- List of In Another World with My Smartphone episodes
- List of Infinite Stratos episodes
- List of Initial D episodes
- List of In/Spectre episodes
- List of Inukami! episodes
- List of The Irregular at Magic High School episodes
- List of The Irresponsible Captain Tylor episodes
- List of Is It Wrong to Try to Pick Up Girls in a Dungeon? episodes
- List of Is the Order a Rabbit? episodes
- List of Is This a Zombie? episodes
- List of Isekai Quartet episodes
- List of Itazura na Kiss episodes

== J ==
- List of Hell Teacher: Jigoku Sensei Nube episodes
- List of JoJo's Bizarre Adventure episodes
- List of Jormungand episodes
- List of Jubei-chan episodes
- List of Jubei-chan 2 episodes
- List of Jujutsu Kaisen episodes
- List of Jungle Book Shōnen Mowgli episodes
- List of Junjō Romantica episodes
- List of Juuni Senshi Bakuretsu Eto Ranger episodes

== K ==
- List of K episodes
- List of K-On! episodes
- List of The Kabocha Wine episodes
- List of Kaguya-sama: Love Is War episodes
- List of Kaiji episodes
- List of Kaiju No. 8 episodes
- List of Kaiketsu Zorori episodes
- List of Kakuriyo: Bed & Breakfast for Spirits episodes
- List of Kamisama Kiss episodes
- List of Kamisama Minarai: Himitsu no Cocotama episodes
- List of Kämpfer episodes
- List of Kannagi: Crazy Shrine Maidens episodes
- List of Kanokon episodes
- List of Kanon episodes
- List of Karakuri Circus episodes
- List of Karin episodes
- List of Kashimashi: Girl Meets Girl episodes
- List of Katana Maidens: Toji No Miko episodes
- List of Kaze no Stigma episodes
- List of Kekkaishi episodes
- List of Kemono Friends episodes
- List of Kengan Ashura episodes
- List of Kenichi: The Mightiest Disciple episodes
- List of Kiba (TV series) episodes
- List of Kiddy Girl-and episodes
- List of Kiddy Grade episodes
- List of Kids on the Slope episodes
- List of Kill la Kill episodes
- List of Kimagure Orange Road episodes
- List of Kimba the White Lion episodes
- List of Kimi ni Todoke episodes
- List of Kimi to Boku episodes
- List of KimiKiss: Pure Rouge episodes
- List of Kin-iro Mosaic episodes
- List of Kingdom (Japanese TV series) episodes
- List of Kinnikuman episodes
- List of Kino's Journey episodes
- List of Kira Kira Happy Hirake! Cocotama episodes
- List of Kirarin Revolution episodes
- List of Kirarin Revolution Stage 3 episodes
- List of Kiratto Pri Chan episodes
- List of Kirby: Right Back at Ya! episodes
- List of Kiss×sis episodes
- List of Kiteretsu Daihyakka episodes
- List of The Knight in the Area episodes
- List of Knights of Sidonia episodes
- List of Kobato episodes
- List of KochiKame episodes
- List of Kodocha episodes
- List of Kodomo no Jikan episodes
- List of Koihime Musō episodes
- List of Komi Can't Communicate episodes
- List of KonoSuba episodes
- List of Konpeki no Kantai episodes
- List of Kuma Kuma Kuma Bear episodes
- List of Kure-nai episodes
- List of Kurokami: The Animation episodes
- List of Kuroko's Basketball episodes
- List of Kuromajo-san ga Toru!! episodes
- List of Kyo Kara Maoh! episodes
- List of Kyō no Go no Ni episodes
- List of Kyōran Kazoku Nikki episodes
- List of Kyousougiga episodes

== L ==
- List of Lagrange: The Flower of Rin-ne episodes
- List of Laid-Back Camp episodes
- List of Last Exile episodes
- List of The Laughing Salesman episodes
- List of The Law of Ueki episodes
- List of Le Chevalier D'Eon episodes
- List of Legend of the Galactic Heroes episodes
- List of The Legend of the Legendary Heroes episodes
- List of Legendz episodes
- List of Library War episodes
- List of Linebarrels of Iron episodes
- List of Alya Sometimes Hides Her Feelings in Russian episodes
- List of As a Reincarnated Aristocrat, I'll Use My Appraisal Skill to Rise in the World episodes
- List of Bye Bye, Earth episodes
- List of Cells at Work! episodes
- List of Fly Me to the Moon episodes
- List of Hell's Paradise episodes
- List of Horimiya episodes
- List of Ninjala episodes
- List of The Executioner and Her Way of Life episodes
- List of This Monster Wants to Eat Me episodes
- List of Whisper Me a Love Song episodes
- List of Yuri Is My Job! episodes
- List of Listen to Me, Girls. I Am Your Father! episodes
- List of Little Busters! episodes
- List of A Little Snow Fairy Sugar episodes
- List of Little Witch Academia episodes
- List of Log Horizon episodes
- List of Lord Marksman and Vanadis episodes
- List of Lost Universe episodes
- List of Love Hina episodes
- List of Love Lab episodes
- List of Love Live! episodes
- List of Love, Chunibyo & Other Delusions episodes
- List of Loveless episodes
- List of Lucky Star episodes
- List of Lupin the 3rd Part 6 episodes
- List of Lupin the 3rd Part IV: The Italian Adventure episodes
- List of Lupin the 3rd Part 5 episodes
- List of Lupin the 3rd Part I episodes
- List of Lupin the 3rd Part II episodes
- List of Lupin the Third: The Woman Called Fujiko Mine episodes
- List of Lycoris Recoil episodes

== M ==
- List of Maburaho episodes
- List of Macross Delta episodes
- List of Macross Frontier episodes
- List of Made in Abyss episodes
- List of Madlax episodes
- List of Magi: The Labyrinth of Magic episodes
- List of Magia Record episodes
- List of Magic Knight Rayearth episodes
- List of Magical Girl Lyrical Nanoha episodes
- List of The Magical Revolution of the Reincarnated Princess and the Genius Young Lady episodes
- List of My-HiME episodes
- List of Maid Sama! episodes
- List of Maison Ikkoku episodes
- List of Majestic Prince episodes
- List of Majin Bone episodes
- List of Major episodes
- List of Malevolent Spirits: Mononogatari episodes
- List of Manga Fairy Tales of the World episodes
- List of Maoyu episodes
- List of Maple Town episodes
- List of March Comes In like a Lion episodes
- List of MÄR episodes
- List of Maria Holic episodes
- List of Maria-sama ga Miteru episodes
- List of Martian Successor Nadesico episodes
- List of Marvel Anime episodes
- List of Marvel Disk Wars: The Avengers episodes
- List of Mashle episodes
- List of Master Keaton episodes
- List of Mazinger Z episodes
- List of Medabots episodes
- List of Medaka Box episodes
- List of Megalobox episodes
- List of Meine Liebe episodes
- List of Mekakucity Actors episodes
- List of The Melancholy of Haruhi Suzumiya episodes
- List of The Melancholy of Haruhi-chan Suzumiya episodes
- List of Mermaid Melody Pichi Pichi Pitch episodes
- List of Minami-ke episodes
- List of Miracle Girls episodes
- List of The Misfit of Demon King Academy episodes
- List of Miss Kobayashi's Dragon Maid episodes
- List of Miss Monochrome episodes
- List of Mitsudomoe episodes
- List of Mob Psycho 100 episodes
- List of Mobile Fighter G Gundam episodes
- List of Mobile Suit Gundam episodes
- List of Mobile Suit Gundam 00 episodes
- List of Mobile Suit Gundam AGE episodes
- List of Mobile Suit Gundam SEED episodes
- List of Mobile Suit Gundam SEED Destiny episodes
- List of Mobile Suit Gundam Unicorn episodes
- List of Mobile Suit Gundam Wing episodes
- List of Mobile Suit Gundam ZZ episodes
- List of Mobile Suit Gundam: Iron-Blooded Orphans episodes
- List of Mobile Suit Gundam: The Origin episodes
- List of Mobile Suit Gundam: The Witch from Mercury episodes
- List of Mobile Suit Victory Gundam episodes
- List of Mobile Suit Zeta Gundam episodes
- List of Modern Magic Made Simple episodes
- List of Monkey Magic TV episodes
- List of Monochrome Factor episodes
- List of Monogatari episodes
- List of Monster episodes
- List of Monsuno episodes
- List of Moomin episodes
- List of Moribito: Guardian of the Spirit episodes
- List of Moyasimon episodes
- List of Mr. Osomatsu episodes
- List of Mr. Tonegawa: Middle Management Blues episodes
- List of Munto episodes
- List of Mushishi episodes
- List of Mushoku Tensei episodes
- List of Muv-Luv Alternative episodes
- List of Muv-Luv Alternative: Total Eclipse episodes
- List of My Bride Is a Mermaid episodes
- List of My Dress-Up Darling episodes
- List of My Happy Marriage episodes
- List of My Hero Academia episodes
- List of My Little Monster episodes
- List of My Love Story!! episodes
- List of My Neighbor Seki episodes
- List of My-Otome episodes
- List of Myself ; Yourself episodes
- List of The Mysterious Cities of Gold episodes
- List of Mysterious Joker episodes

== N ==
- List of Nabari no Ou episodes
- List of Nadia: The Secret of Blue Water episodes
- List of Nagi-Asu: A Lull in the Sea episodes
- List of Nana episodes
- List of Nanatsuiro Drops episodes
- List of Natsume's Book of Friends episodes
- List of Needless episodes
- List of Negima episodes
- List of Nekopara episodes
- List of Neo Angelique Abyss episodes
- List of Neon Genesis Evangelion episodes
- List of Neuro: Supernatural Detective episodes
- List of New Game! episodes
- List of Nichijou episodes
- List of Nier: Automata Ver1.1a episodes
- List of Night Wizard episodes
- List of Nijū Mensō no Musume episodes
- List of Ninja Hattori-kun episodes
- List of Nisekoi episodes
- List of No Guns Life episodes
- List of Nodame Cantabile episodes
- List of Noir episodes
- List of Non Non Biyori episodes
- List of Noragami episodes
- List of Nura: Rise of the Yokai Clan episodes
- List of Nyaruko: Crawling with Love episodes

== O ==
- List of Occult Academy episodes
- List of Oishinbo episodes
- List of Ojamajo Doremi episodes
- List of Ojarumaru episodes
- List of Ōkami Kakushi episodes
- List of Oku-sama wa Mahō Shōjo: Bewitched Agnes episodes
- List of Omamori Himari episodes
- List of One episodes
- List of One Week Friends episodes
- List of One-Punch Man episodes
- List of Oreimo episodes
- List of Oshi no Ko episodes
- List of Otome wa Boku ni Koishiteru episodes
- List of Our Home's Fox Deity episodes
- List of Our Last Crusade or the Rise of a New World episodes
- List of Ouran High School Host Club episodes
- List of Outlaw Star episodes
- List of Overlord episodes

== P ==
- List of Pandora Hearts episodes
- List of Pani Poni Dash! episodes
- List of Panty & Stocking with Garterbelt episodes
- List of Papillon Rose episodes
- List of Paranoia Agent episodes
- List of Parasyte -the maxim- episodes
- List of Patlabor episodes
- List of Peacemaker Kurogane episodes
- List of Penguin Musume Heart episodes
- List of Penguindrum episodes
- List of Perman episodes
- List of The Pet Girl of Sakurasou episodes
- List of Phantom: Requiem for the Phantom episodes
- List of Phantom Thief Jeanne episodes
- List of Phi Brain: Puzzle of God episodes
- List of Pilot Candidate episodes
- List of Pita-Ten episodes
- List of Planetes episodes
- List of Platinum End episodes
- List of Plunderer episodes
- List of Popotan episodes
- List of Powerpuff Girls Z episodes
- List of Poyopoyo Kansatsu Nikki episodes
- List of Pretty Rhythm: Aurora Dream episodes
- List of Pretty Rhythm: Dear My Future episodes
- List of Pretty Rhythm: Rainbow Live episodes
- List of Princess Connect! Re:Dive episodes
- List of Princess Knight episodes
- List of Princess Resurrection episodes
- List of Princess Sara episodes
- List of Princess Tutu episodes
- List of PriPara episodes
- List of The Promised Neverland episodes
- List of Psychic Detective Yakumo episodes
- List of Psycho-Pass episodes
- List of Puchimas! Petit Idolmaster episodes
- List of Puella Magi Madoka Magica episodes
- List of Pumpkin Scissors episodes
- List of Punch Line episodes
- List of Puzzle & Dragons X episodes

== Q ==
- List of Queen's Blade episodes
- List of Queen's Blade Rebellion episodes
- List of The Quintessential Quintuplets episodes
- List of The Qwaser of Stigmata episodes

== R ==
- List of R.O.D the TV episodes
- List of Radiant episodes
- List of Rage of Bahamut episodes
- List of RahXephon episodes
- List of Rainbow: Nisha Rokubō no Shichinin episodes
- List of Ranma ½ episodes
- List of Rave Master episodes
- List of Re: Hamatora episodes
- List of Re:Zero episodes
- List of Real Drive episodes
- List of Reborn as a Vending Machine, I Now Wander the Dungeon episodes
- List of Recently, My Sister is Unusual episodes
- List of Record of Lodoss War episodes
- List of Record of Ragnarok episodes
- List of Recorder and Randsell episodes
- List of Red Garden episodes
- List of Rent-A-Girlfriend episodes
- List of Rental Magica episodes
- List of Rescueman episodes
- List of Revolutionary Girl Utena episodes
- List of Rewrite episodes
- List of Rilu Rilu Fairilu episodes
- List of Rin-ne episodes
- List of The Rising of the Shield Hero episodes
- List of Ro-Kyu-Bu! episodes
- List of Robotech episodes
- List of Robotics;Notes episodes
- List of Romeo × Juliet episodes
- List of Ronin Warriors episodes
- List of Rosario + Vampire episodes
- List of The Rose of Versailles episodes
- List of Rozen Maiden episodes
- List of Rumbling Hearts episodes
- List of Rurouni Kenshin (1996 TV series) episodes

== S ==
- List of S-CRY-ed episodes
- List of Saekano episodes
- List of Saga of Tanya the Evil episodes
- List of Sailor Moon episodes
- List of Sailor Moon Crystal episodes
- List of Saiyuki episodes
- List of Sakamoto Days episodes
- List of Saki episodes
- List of Sakura Wars episodes
- List of Samurai 7 episodes
- List of Samurai Champloo episodes
- List of Samurai Harem: Asu no Yoichi episodes
- List of Samurai Pizza Cats episodes
- List of Sasami: Magical Girls Club episodes
- List of Save Me! Lollipop episodes
- List of Say I Love You episodes
- List of Sayonara, Zetsubou-Sensei episodes
- List of Scan2Go episodes
- List of Scarlet Nexus episodes
- List of School Days episodes
- List of School Rumble episodes
- List of Schwarzesmarken episodes
- List of Scrapped Princess episodes
- List of SD Gundam Sangokuden Brave Battle Warriors episodes
- List of Seitokai Yakuindomo episodes
- List of Sekirei episodes
- List of Sengoku Collection episodes
- List of Symphogear episodes
- List of Senran Kagura episodes
- List of Seraph of the End episodes
- List of The Seven Deadly Sins episodes
- List of Seven Mortal Sins episodes
- List of Sgt. Frog episodes
- List of Shadow Star episodes
- List of Shadows House episodes
- List of Shakugan no Shana episodes
- List of Shangri-La episodes
- List of Shangri-La Frontier episodes
- List of Shigofumi episodes
- List of Shigurui episodes
- List of Shiki episodes
- List of Shinkyoku Sōkai Polyphonica episodes
- List of Shirobako episodes
- List of Show by Rock!! episodes
- List of Shuffle! episodes
- List of Shy episodes
- List of Simoun episodes
- List of Sister Princess episodes
- List of Sket Dance episodes
- List of Skip Beat! episodes
- List of Slam Dunk episodes
- List of Slayers episodes
- List of Sola episodes
- List of Solo Leveling episodes
- List of Solty Rei episodes
- List of Sonic X episodes
- List of Sora no Manimani episodes
- List of Sorcerous Stabber Orphen (1998 TV series) episodes
- List of Sorcerous Stabber Orphen (2020 TV series) episodes
- List of Soreike! Anpanman episodes
- List of Soul Eater episodes
- List of Soul Link episodes
- List of Sound! Euphonium episodes
- List of Space Brothers episodes
- List of Space Cobra episodes
- List of Space Dandy episodes
- List of Space Runaway Ideon episodes
- List of Space Symphony Maetel episodes
- List of Special A episodes
- List of Speed Grapher episodes
- List of Speed Racer episodes
- List of Spice and Wolf episodes
- List of Spice and Wolf: Merchant Meets the Wise Wolf episodes
- List of Spy × Family episodes
- List of Squid Girl episodes
- List of SSSS.Dynazenon episodes
- List of SSSS.Gridman episodes
- List of Star Driver episodes
- List of Star-Myu episodes
- List of Starship Operators episodes
- List of Steel Angel Kurumi episodes
- List of Steins;Gate 0 episodes
- List of Steins;Gate episodes
- List of Stitch! episodes
- List of Stop!! Hibari-kun! episodes
- List of The Story of Saiunkoku episodes
- List of Strawberry 100% episodes
- List of Strawberry Marshmallow episodes
- List of Strawberry Panic episodes
- List of Strike the Blood episodes
- List of Strike Witches episodes
- List of Sugar Sugar Rune episodes
- List of Summer Time Rendering episodes
- List of Sunday Without God episodes
- List of Super Dimension Fortress Macross episodes
- List of Super Lovers episodes
- List of Suzuka episodes
- List of Sweet Blue Flowers episodes
- List of Sword Art Online episodes
- List of Sword Art Online Alternative: Gun Gale Online episodes

== T ==
- List of Taboo Tattoo episodes
- List of Tactics episodes
- List of Tales of the Abyss episodes
- List of Tales of Zestiria the X episodes
- List of Tamako Market episodes
- List of Tamayura episodes
- List of Tantei Opera Milky Holmes episodes
- List of Tayutama: Kiss on my Deity episodes
- List of Tears to Tiara episodes
- List of Teasing Master Takagi-san episodes
- List of Teekyu episodes
- List of Tegami Bachi episodes
- List of Telepathy Shōjo Ran episodes
- List of Tenchi Muyo! War on Geminar episodes
- List of Tenjho Tenge episodes
- List of Tenkai Knights episodes
- List of Terra Formars episodes
- List of The Testament of Sister New Devil episodes
- List of That Time I Got Reincarnated as a Slime episodes
- List of Tiger & Bunny episodes
- List of Tiger Mask W episodes
- List of Time Bokan episodes
- List of To Heart episodes
- List of To Your Eternity episodes
- List of To Love Ru episodes
- List of Toilet-Bound Hanako-kun episodes
- List of Tōka Gettan episodes
- List of Tokyo Ghoul episodes
- List of Tokyo Majin episodes
- List of Tokyo Mew Mew episodes
- List of Tokyo Mew Mew New episodes
- List of Tokyo Revengers episodes
- List of Tokyo Underground episodes
- List of Toradora! episodes
- List of Toriko episodes
- List of Tottemo! Luckyman episodes
- List of Tottoko Hamutaro Hai! episodes
- List of Touch anime episodes
- List of The Tower of Druaga episodes
- List of Tower of God episodes
- List of Transformers: Armada episodes
- List of Transformers: Cybertron episodes
- List of Transformers: Energon episodes
- List of Tribe Cool Crew episodes
- List of Trinity Blood episodes
- List of True Tears episodes
- List of Tsubasa: Reservoir Chronicle episodes
- List of Tsugumomo episodes
- List of Tsukihime, Lunar Legend episodes
- List of Tsukimichi: Moonlit Fantasy episodes
- List of Tsukuyomi: Moon Phase episodes
- List of Tsurupika Hagemaru episodes
- List of Turn A Gundam episodes
- List of Twelve Kingdoms episodes
- List of Twin Princess of Wonder Planet episodes
- List of Twin Princess of Wonder Planet Gyu! episodes
- List of Twin Spica episodes
- List of Twin Star Exorcists episodes
- List of Tytania episodes

== U ==
- List of UFO Baby episodes
- List of UFO Ultramaiden Valkyrie episodes
- List of Ultimate Muscle episodes
- List of Ultimate Otaku Teacher episodes
- List of Ulysses 31 episodes
- List of Umamusume: Pretty Derby episodes
- List of Umineko When They Cry episodes
- List of Undefeated Bahamut Chronicle episodes
- List of Uninhabited Planet Survive! episodes
- List of Unnamed Memory episodes
- List of Ushio & Tora episodes
- List of Uta no Prince-sama episodes
- List of Utawarerumono episodes

== V ==
- List of Val × Love episodes
- List of Valkyria Chronicles episodes
- List of Valvrave the Liberator episodes
- List of Vampire Knight episodes
- List of Vampire Princess Miyu episodes
- List of Vandread episodes
- List of Viewtiful Joe episodes
- List of Vinland Saga episodes
- List of Viper's Creed episodes
- List of The Vision of Escaflowne episodes
- List of Voltron episodes

== W ==
- List of The Wallflower episodes
- List of Wandering Son episodes
- List of Wangan Midnight episodes
- List of We Never Learn episodes
- List of We Were There episodes
- List of Welcome to Demon School! Iruma-kun episodes
- List of Welcome to Irabu's Office episodes
- List of Welcome to the N.H.K. episodes
- List of White Album episodes
- List of Witch Hat Atelier episodes
- List of Witch Hunter Robin episodes
- List of WIXOSS episodes
- List of Wolf's Rain episodes
- List of Working!! episodes
- List of The World God Only Knows episodes
- List of World Trigger episodes

== X ==
- List of X episodes
- List of Xam'd: Lost Memories episodes
- List of xxxHolic episodes

== Y ==
- List of Yakitate!! Japan episodes
- List of Yakushiji Ryōko no Kaiki Jikenbo episodes
- List of Yashahime episodes
- List of Yatterman (2008 TV series) episodes
- List of Yawara! episodes
- List of Yo-kai Watch (2014 TV series) episodes
- List of Yona of the Dawn episodes
- List of You're Under Arrest episodes
- List of Your Lie in April episodes
- List of Yowamushi Pedal episodes
- List of Yozakura Quartet episodes
- List of Yu-Gi-Oh! episodes
- List of Yu-Gi-Oh! 5D's episodes
- List of Yu-Gi-Oh! Arc-V episodes
- List of Yu-Gi-Oh! Go Rush!! episodes
- List of Yu-Gi-Oh! GX episodes
- List of Yu-Gi-Oh! Sevens episodes
- List of Yu-Gi-Oh! VRAINS episodes
- List of Yu-Gi-Oh! Zexal episodes
- List of Yu-Gi-Oh! Zexal II episodes
- List of Yuki Yuna Is a Hero episodes
- List of Yume Tsukai episodes
- List of Yumeiro Patissiere episodes
- List of Yumeria episodes
- List of Yuri on Ice episodes
- List of YuruYuri episodes

== Z ==
- List of Zettai Karen Children episodes
- List of Zoids: Chaotic Century episodes
- List of Zoids: Genesis episodes
- List of Zombie Land Saga episodes
