= List of Perman episodes =

Perman is a Japanese anime television series based on the manga of the same page. Two anime television series based on the manga were produced. The first television series, consisting of 54 two-part episodes, was produced by Tokyo Movie with music composed by Hiroshi Tsutsui. It was broadcast on TBS from April 2, 1967, to April 14, 1968. Certain episodes are lost and some episodes have lost their audio. This version was dubbed into Mexican Spanish, and it is unknown if the dub has any of the lost episodes.

The second anime television series was produced by Shin-Ei Animation under the direction Hiroshi Sasagawa and Sadayoshi Tominaga with Akihiko Takashima composing the music. The series was first broadcast every Monday through Saturday on TV Asahi from April 4, 1983, to March 30, 1985. Starting on April 2, 1985, the series switched to a weekly broadcast and concluded on July 2, 1987, for a total of 526 episodes.

== Episode list ==
=== 1983 ===
| Air date | EP# | English title | Japanese title |
|---|---|---|---|
| 04-04 | 1 | Perman's Debut!! | パーマン登場！！ |
| 04-05 | 2 | Perman Baseball | 野球はパーマン |
| 04-06 | 3 | Ganko is an Inept Detective?! | ガン子は迷探偵？！ |
| 04-07 | 4 | Hello, I'm Pako | こんにちはパー子です |
| 04-08 | 5 | The Teacher is Coming!! | 先生がくる！！ |
| 04-09 | 6 | Booby is Chased | 追い出されたブービー |
| 04-11 | 7 | I am Peryan | パーヤンですねん |
| 04-12 | 8 | Pako's True Identity | パー子の正体 |
| 04-13 | 9 | All Permans Assemble!! | パーマン全員集合！！ |
| 04-14 | 10 | Careful of the Water!! | 水にご用心！！ |
| 04-15 | 11 | Bid Kid Perman | 悪い子パーマン |
| 04-12 | 12 | Gerageramaru SOS | ゲラゲラ丸SOS |
| 04-18 | 13 | Perman for Hire | やとわれパーマン |
| 04-19 | 14 | Grandma Came Back | 帰ってきたおばあさん |
| 04-20 | 15 | Come to Me Horn | ラッパとんでこい |
| 04-21 | 16 | A Kind, Kind Girl | やさしいやさしい女の子 |
| 04-22 | 17 | Perman and the Strange Trailer | パーマンと謎のトレーラー |
| 04-23 | 18 | My Life is in Danger | わたしの命はねらわれている |
| 04-25 | 19 | I Want to Quit Perman | パーマンやめたい |
| 04-26 | 20 | We Found the Uressher | ウレッシャー号みつけた |
| 04-27 | 21 | Girl's Battle | 女のたたかい |
| 04-28 | 22 | Perman's Day Off | パーマンの休日 |
| 04-29 | 23 | All Permans Assemble!! | パーマン全員集合！！ |
| 04-30 | 24 | Stranger's Crystal Ball | 怪人ネタボール |
| 05-02 | 25 | Sheltered Son | 箱入りむすこ |
| 05-03 | 26 | Make Me Perman 5 | おれをパーマン5号にしろ |
| 05-04 | 27 | Perman's Part-time Job | パーマンのアルバイト |
| 05-05 | 28 | Which is the Copy?! | どちらがコピー？！ |
| 05-06 | 29 | Fake Perman | にせ者パーマン |
| 05-07 | 30 | Being Perman is Hard | パーマンはつらいよ |
| 05-09 | 31 | Found! Perman's Papa and Mama | 発見！パーマンのパパとママ |
| 05-10 | 32 | After the Counterfeiter!! | ニセ札犯人を追え！！ |
| 05-11 | 33 | Even So, Mitsuo Will Do It! | それでもミツ夫はやる！ |
| 05-12 | 34 | I'm a Ninja | 忍者でござる |
| 05-13 | 35 | Return to Crocodile's Birthplace | ワニ故郷へ帰る |
| 05-14 | 36 | Perman Buried Alive | 生き埋めパーマン |
| 05-16 | 37 | Mitsuo's Runaway Cockatoo | ミッちゃんの逃げたオウム |
| 05-17 | 38 | Midnight Chaos at the Bath | 真夜中のお風呂騒動 |
| 05-18 | 39 | I Hate Field Trips! | 遠足なんて大きらい！ |
| 05-19 | 40 | The Home Run Ball is Mine | ホームランボールはぼくのもの |
| 05-20 | 41 | Dinosaur Hunt | 恐竜さがし |
| 05-21 | 42 | Perman is a Bank Robber？！ | パーマンが銀行ギャング？！ |
| 05-23 | 43 | Catch the Thief! | スリを捕まえろ！ |
| 05-24 | 44 | I Can't Be Perman | パーマンになれない |
| 05-25 | 45 | Clockwork Mansion!? | とんだからくり屋敷！？ |
| 05-26 | 46 | Perman and Judo Man | パーマンと柔道マン |
| 05-27 | 47 | Perman's School Exploration | パーマンの学校探検い |
| 05-28 | 48 | Lift with the Hips! | みこしだ！ワッショイ！ |
| 05-30 | 49 | Shark Hunt on the Southern Isle | 南の島のサメ退治 |
| 05-31 | 50 | A Sad Victory | かなしい勝利 |
| 06‑01 | 51 | What is Ganko Afraid Of? | あのガン子のこわい物は？ |
| 06‑02 | 52 | Watch Out for the Novelist | 小説家には注意しろ |
| 06‑03 | 53 | Copy Robot Fell in Love!? | コピーロボットが恋をした！？ |
| 06‑04 | 54 | Let's Photograph Perman | パーマンを写そう |
| 06‑06 | 55 | Booby the Circus Star | サーカスの星ブービー |
| 06‑07 | 56 | I Lost to Ganko | ガン子にゃ負けたよ |
| 06‑08 | 57 | My Famous Friend | わが友有名人 |
| 06‑09 | 58 | The Missing Perman Badge | 消えたパーマンバッジ |
| 06‑10 | 59 | A Workaholic Granny | モーレツ婆さんがやって来た |
| 06‑11 | 60 | Training For Copy Robot | 特訓はコピーロボットで |
| 06‑13 | 61 | Tanuki Police Squad Debut! | タヌキ警部登場！ |
| 06‑14 | 62 | Pottery and the President | ねん土細工と大統領 |
| 06‑15 | 63 | Handcuffs and Hotcakes | 手錠とホットケーキ |
| 06‑16 | 64 | Sabu and Perman | サブとパーマン |
| 06‑17 | 65 | Handyman Perman | べんり屋パーマン |
| 06‑18 | 66 | Secret of the Perman Set | パーマンセットの秘密 |
| 06‑20 | 67 | Amazing Portrayal | とんだ写生会 |
| 06‑21 | 68 | Rainy Day Perman | 雨の日のパーマン |
| 06‑22 | 69 | Tired of Hot Springs | 温泉は疲れるよ |
| 06‑23 | 70 | Enough Private Tutors | 家庭教師はもうごめん |
| 06‑24 | 71 | Ganko's Solo Journey | ガン子一人旅 |
| 06‑25 | 72 | Perman Brings Ice | 氷を運ぶパーマン |
| 06‑27 | 73 | Pyramid Exploring | ピラミッド探検 |
| 06‑28 | 74 | All-purpose Perman | なんでもパーマン |
| 06‑29 | 75 | I Want to Play | ぼくだって遊びたい |
| 06‑30 | 76 | Cheap Date | 節約デート |
| 07‑01 | 77 | Mama Doesn't Understand Anything | ママって何にもわかっちゃいない |
| 07‑02 | 78 | Perman's Fanclub | パーマンのファンクラブ |
| 07‑04 | 79 | Crush on the Teacher | あこがれの先生 |
| 07‑05 | 80 | The Cook who Knows the Secret | 秘密を知ったクック |
| 07‑06 | 81 | I Caught a Monster Fish?! | 怪魚シーラゴンスは釣れたか？！ |
| 07‑07 | 82 | Love Sign from an Idol | アイドルからのラブサイン |
| 07‑06 | 83 | Mysterious Senmensou Appears! | 怪人千面相現わる！ |
| 07‑09 | 84 | Peryan Does Some Sightseeing | パーヤン観光ですねん |
| 07‑11 | 85 | Kind Villain | やさしい悪役 |
| 07‑12 | 86 | Copy Robot Assembly | コピーロボット全員集合 |
| 07‑13 | 87 | Heatstroke Perman | 夏バテパーマン |
| 07‑14 | 88 | Booby's First Love | 恋ブービーてんまつ記 |
| 07‑15 | 89 | Confusion with the Bathhouse Keeper | お風呂やさんは大騒ぎ |
| 07‑16 | 90 | Perman's Lucky Message | パーマンのロッキー便り |
| 07‑18 | 91 | Find the Teacher's Bride | 先生の花嫁をさがせ |
| 07‑19 | 92 | Siblings Must Help Each Other | 兄妹は助け合わなくちゃ |
| 07‑20 | 93 | Perman and Booby's Argument | パーマンとブービーのけんか |
| 07‑21 | 94 | Perman Goes to the Sea | パーマン海へ行く |
| 07‑22 | 95 | Ukii! Booby's Transformation | ウキィ！ブービーの変身 |
| 07‑23 | 96 | Perman Connected | つながれたパーマン |
| 07‑25 | 97 | Perman Has a Toothache | 歯痛のパーマン |
| 07‑26 | 98 | Perman's Early-riser Plan | パーマンの早起き大作戦 |
| 07‑27 | 99 | Sunburned Perman | 日焼けパーマン |
| 07‑28 | 100 | Senmensou's Jailbreak | 千面相の脱獄 |
| 07‑29 | 101 | I Love Ganko's Glasses | ガン子のメガネ大好き |
| 07‑30 | 102 | Perman is Very Busy | パーマンは大忙し |
| | 103 | The model airplane context | |

=== 1985 ===
| Air date | EP# | English title | Japanese title |
|---|---|---|---|
| 01‑07 | 470 | Perman's Yoyo Plan | パーマンのヨーヨー大作戦 |
| 01‑08 | 471 | Copy is a detective | コピーは名探偵 |
| 01‑09 | 472 | Perman Paper Sumo | パーマン紙相撲 |
| 01‑10 | 473 | Perman's with a Pacifier !! | おしゃぶりパーマン |
| 01-14 | 474 | Booby's Gratitude | ブービーの恩がえし |
| 01‑15 | 475 | Ganko's Carrier Pidgeon | ガン子の渡り鳥 |
| 01‑16 | 476 | Sumire's Fan Appreciation Tour | スミレのファン感謝ツアー |
| 01‑17 | 477 | Perman Laser Plan | パーマンレーザー大作戦 |
| 01‑21 | 478 | Negative Perman Power | マイナスのパーマンパワー |
| 01‑22 | 479 | Pako's Secret Diary | パー子の秘密のダイアリー |
| 01‑23 | 480 | Peryan's Osaka Holiday | パーヤン大阪の休日 |
| 01-24 | 481 | Sumire is Mine! | スミレちゃんはわいのもんや！ |
| 01‑28 | 482 | Lightning Perman | 電光パーマン |
| 01‑29 | 483 | Finished! Perman's House | 完成！パーマンの家 |
| 01‑30 | 484 | Perman's Daily Life | パーヤンの日々 |
| 01‑31 | 485 | Perman's Confession Box | パーマンのざんげボックス |
| 02‑04 | 486 | Stop Collecting Permen!! | パーマンコレクションはもうやめて！！ |
| 02‑05 | 487 | Mommy's Skinship Plan | ママのスキンシップ作戦 |
| 02-06 | 488 | Mitsuo is Immortal | ミツ夫は不死身だ |
| 02‑11 | 489 | Being Popular is Scary! | もてるのは怖いよ～ん！ |
| 03‑12 | 490 | Perman Became Perko?! | パー子になったパーマン？！ |
| 02-13 | 491 | Play with Perman! | パーマンと遊ぼう！ |
| 02-18 | 492 | Perman will be Adopted? | パーマン養子になる？ |
| 02‑19 | 493 | Monster Perman?! | 怪物パーマン？！ |
| 02‑20 | 494 | Get a Date! | デートを狙え！ |
| 02-25 | 495 | Will the Fighting Octopus WIn or Lose | 勝つか負けるかケンカだこ |
| 02‑26 | 496 | New Bam-bam Ball Fad | ただいま流行バンバンボール |
| 02‑27 | 497 | Remote Control Perman | リモコンパーマン |
| 03‑04 | 498 | Weightlessness Training for Space | 宇宙をめざす無重力訓練 |
| 03‑05 | 499 | Selling Love to Perman | パーマンに愛の押し売り！！ |
| 03‑06 | 500 | Grandma is a Famous Fisherman | パパは釣り名人 |
| 03‑07 | 501 | I'm Flying Boy Perman | 飛行少年パーマンだい |
| 03‑08 | 502 | Perman vs Peryan Ironman Race | パーマン対パーヤンの鉄人レース |
| 03-21 | 503 | Perman Warp Makes your Head Spin | パーマンワープは眼がまわる |
| 03‑13 | 504 | Perman's Lifesaver | パーマンの命の恩人 |
| 03‑14 | 505 | Mitsuo's Time has Come! | ミツ夫の時代がやって来た！ |
| 03‑18 | 506 | Transform, Transform, Transform Again! | 変身、変身、また変身！ |
| 03‑19 | 507 | I'm a Man! I'm Perman! | 俺は男だ！パーマンだ！ |
| 03‑20 | 508 | Perman Became a Doll? | お人形になったパーマン？ |
| 03‑21 | 509 | Perman Power is a Red Lamp?! | パーマンパワーが赤ランプ？！ |
| 03-25 | 510 | Perman-style Animal Fist | パーマン式アニマル拳 |
| 03‑26 | 511 | From Today On, I'm Birdman | 今日から僕がバードマン |
| 03‑27 | 512 | Perko-sensei's Spartan Training | パー子先生のスパルタ教育！ |
| 03-28 | 513 | Making Yourself Perman 5 | 勝手にパーマン5号 |
| 04‑02 | 514 | Perko's Whip is Strong! | パー子のムチはきつーいぞ |
| 04‑09 | 515 | Enough Uninvited Girlfriends | 押しかけ女房はこりごり |
| 04‑16 | 516 | Booby Disqualified as a Perman? | ブービーはパーマン失格？ |
| 04-23 | 517 | Copy Became an Adult?! | コピーが大人になった？！ |
| 04‑30 | 518 | Harisen Technique Booby | 必殺ハリセンブービー |
| 05‑07 | 519 | Ganko's Flower Story | ガン子の花物語 |
| 05‑14 | 520 | Death-defying Flying Trapeze!! | 決死の超高層ブランコ！！ |
| 05‑21 | 521 | Birdman's Day Off | バードマンの休日 |
| 06‑04 | 522 | Is it Here!? Strange Ghost Monster | 出た！？おかしなゴースト怪獣 |
| 06‑11 | 523 | Patrol Without a Badge | バッジなきパトロール |
| 06‑18 | 524 | What is this Star Mark? | この星マークはなんの星？ |
| 06‑25 | 525 | I Teach How to Fly | 空の飛びかた教えます |
| 07‑02 | 526 | What is Pako's Treasure? | パー子の宝物ってなーんだ？ |

=== Specials ===
| Air date | EP# | English title | Japanese title |
|---|---|---|---|
| 1983‑07‑20 | S1 | Perman All Assemble | パーマンオール百科 |
| 1984‑01‑03 | S2 | Road to Planet Bird | バード星への道 |
| 1984‑10‑01 | S3 | The Secret of Copy World | コピーワールドの謎 |
