= List of Sakura Wars episodes =

This is a list of episodes for the anime adaptations in the Sakura Wars franchise.

== Ouka Kenran ==
4 OVAs produced from 1997 to 1998

=== Gouka Kenran ===
6 OVAs produced from December 1999 to December 2000, sequel to Ouka

== Katsudou Shashin ==
A film produced in 2001, sequel to Gouka

=== Sumire ===
1 OVA produced in 2002, sequel to Katsudou Shashin

== Ecole de Paris ==
3 OVAs produced in 2003, sequel to Gouka

1. 夜明けの花
2. 黒猫と悪女
3. 恋する都市（まち）

=== Le Nouveau Paris ===
3 OVAs produced in 2004, sequel to Ecole

1. 一夜限りのサーカス
2. メル・シー・スパイ
3. 雷の尖塔（いかずちのせんとう）

== New York NY. ==
6 OVAs produced in 2007, spinoff of Ouka

1. ミー&マイガール
2. X…and The City
3. 星の輝く夜に
4. マザー、アイウォントゥシング！
5. 禁断の楽園
6. 紐育（ここ）より永遠（とわ）に
