= List of Cyborg 009 (1968) episodes =

Cyborg 009 is a Japanese anime series based on the manga of the same name written by Shotaro Ishinomori. The series aired on NET in Japan from April 5, 1968, to September 27, 1968. The opening theme is "Cyborg 009" by Meistersinger while the ending theme is "Tatakai Owatte" by Vocal Shop.

== Episode list ==
No.	Title	Original release date
1	"Terror of the Mysterious Man Island"; Transliteration: "Kyōfu no Kaijin Shima" (Japanese: 恐怖の怪人島)	April 5, 1968
2	"The Challenge of X"; Transliteration: "Ekkusu no Chōsen" (Japanese: Xの挑戦)	April 12, 1968
3	"Confrontation at the South Pole"; Transliteration: "Nankyoku no Taiketsu" (Japanese: 南極の対決)	April 19, 1968
4	"Space Demons"; Transliteration: "Uchū Majin" (Japanese: 宇宙魔人)	April 26, 1968
5	"Ah, Kubikuro"; Transliteration: "Ā, kubikuro" (Japanese: あゝクビクロ)	May 3, 1968
6	"The Mission to Rescue Galleria's King"; Transliteration: "Gararia-Ō Kyūshutsu Sakusen" (Japanese: ガラリア王救出作戦)	May 10, 1968
7	"The Disappearing School Bus"; Transliteration: "Kieta Sukūru Basu" (Japanese: 消えたスクール・バス)	May 17, 1968
8	"The Girl with the Golden Eyes"; Transliteration: "Kiniro no Me no Shōjo" (Japanese: 金色の眼の少女)	May 24, 1968
9	"The Night the Devil Walks"; Transliteration: "Akuma wa Yoru Aruku" (Japanese: 悪魔は夜歩く)	May 31, 1968
10	"The Underground Golden Palace"; Transliteration: "Chitei no Kogane Kyūden" (Japanese: 地底の黄金宮殿)	June 7, 1968
11	"The Golden Lion"; Transliteration: "Kogane no Raion" (Japanese: 黄金のライオン)	June 14, 1968
12	"Giant of the Heavens"; Transliteration: "Ten Kakeru Kyojin" (Japanese: 天かける巨人)	June 21, 1968
13	"Secret of the Devil's Castle"; Transliteration: "Akuma Jō no Himitsu" (Japanese: 悪魔城の秘密)	June 28, 1968
14	"The Cursed Desert"; Transliteration: "Norowareta Sabaku" (Japanese: 呪われた砂漠)	July 5, 1968
15	"Tragedy of the Animal Man"; Transliteration: "Higeki no Kemono Hito" (Japanese: 悲劇の獣人)	July 12, 1968
16	"Ghost of the Pacific"; Transliteration: "Taiheiyō no Bōrei" (Japanese: 太平洋の亡霊)	July 19, 1968
17	"Ghost Alliance"; Transliteration: "Yūrei Dōmei" (Japanese: 幽霊同盟)	July 26, 1968
18	"My Father is the Demon's Apostle"; Transliteration: "Waga Chichi wa Akuma no Shito" (Japanese: わが父は悪魔の使徒)	August 2, 1968
19	"Terror of the Nuclear Submarine Sea Snake"; Transliteration: "Kyōfu no Gensen Shī Suneiku-gō" (Japanese: 恐怖の原潜シースネイク号)	August 9, 1968
20	"The Final Escape"; Transliteration: "Hateshinaki Tōbō" (Japanese: 果てしなき逃亡)	August 16, 1968
21	"The Phantom Cavalry Corps"; Transliteration: "Maboroshi no Kiba Gun-dan" (Japanese: 幻の騎馬軍団)	August 23, 1968
22	"The Spirit of Revenge"; Transliteration: "Fukushū Oni" (Japanese: 復讐鬼)	August 30, 1968
23	"The Spirit of Revenge (Part two)" Transliteration: "Fukushū Oni (Kōhen)" (Japanese: 復讐鬼（後編）)	August 6, 1968
24	"Ruthless Challenger"; Transliteration: "Hijō na Chōsen-sha" (Japanese: 非情な挑戦者)	September 13, 1968
25	"Revive! Phoenix"; Transliteration: "Yomigaere! Fushichō" (Japanese: よみがえれ！不死鳥)	September 20, 1968
26	"Warriors of Peace do not Die"; Transliteration: "Heiwa no Senshi wa Shinazu" (Japanese: 平和の戦士は死なず)	September 27, 1968
