= List of Juuni Senshi Bakuretsu Eto Ranger episodes =

Juuni Senshi Bakuretsu Eto Ranger was originally made in Japan by Shaft. 39 episodes aired from 7 April 1995 to 26 January 1996 on TV Tokyo.

No.	Title	Directed by	Written by	Original release date
1	"Does Such Adventure Exist? (こんな冒険ありぃ〜?, Konna Bouken Arii?)"	Kunitoshi Okajima	Mayori Sekijima	April 7, 1995
In another world lies the country island called Mugen, where its animal spirit population live together in harmony. Every year, they hold an annual athletic meet, which commemorates the legendary Zodiac race. But starting at present, the race is interrupted when the evil Jyarei Monsters start altering the Novel Worlds' stories which construct the Novel Pole that holds Mugen in suspension. Ruining the world's stories will cause that world to collapse, thus destroying the Pole and Mugen sinking into the sea. It is up to the 12 Eto Rangers and Kirinda to travel through the Pole's space-timeline and repair their stories to save Mugen.
2	"Defeat the Jyarei Monster (倒せ邪霊モンスター, Taose Jyarei Monsutaa)"	Shinichiro Aoki	Hiroyuki Kawasaki	April 14, 1995
Thanks to the Jyarei Monster, the Novel World of Momotaro has been warped into a sci-fi space war. How can Bakumaru and the other find and defeat the monster and undo the distortions to the story?
3	"Cinderella at Five Past Midnight (〇時五分のシンデレラ, Reiji Gofun no Shinderella)"	Shinichiro Aoki	Hiroyuki Kawasaki	April 21, 1995
The next Novel World is the romantic tale of "Cinderella", and Souffle believes she has found true love. The away team finds everything normal until the next day they realized its nothing more than a themed amusement park. Can they find the Jyarei Monster in time before their 2-day limit is up?
4	"Rude Rabbit, Winning Tortoise (ウサギに失礼、カメしまへん, Usagi ni Shitsuren, Kame Shimahen)"	Hiroshi Kurimoto	Kuniaki Yamashita	April 28, 1995
The next Novel World is Aesop Fable's "The Tortoise and the Hare". But instead of running, the two competitors decided to settle it with automobiles! Can the Eto Rangers find the Jyarei Monster before either can make it to the finish line?
5	"The Ugly Duckling's an Ostrich? (アヒルの子はダチョウ?, Ahiru no ko wa Dacchou?)"	Masahiko Murata	Hiroshi Kurimoto	May 5, 1995
The next Novel World is "The Ugly Duckling", which gets on Tart's nerves after being sick and tired of being treated like a clucking joke. Upon finding the Duckling who is now an ostrich, Tart decides to take the Ugly Duckling under her wing.
6	"Showdown! The Western Saiyuki (決闘! ウェスタンで西遊記, Kettou! Uesutann Saiyuuki)"	Osamu Inoue	Masashi Kubota	May 12, 1995
The next Novel World is the famous Chinese literature, "Journey to the West", where the Jyarei Monster's alterations have taken the story further to the wild, wild west! But a little bit of roughhousing during Kirinda's body has left Bakumaru with a sprained wrist that leaves him a predicament to the away team. It is now up to Monk as the story's Monkey King to save the day.
7	"Help Wanted? Finding Kaguya-hime (本日開店? かぐや姫をさがせ, Honjitsu Kaiten? Kaguyahime o Sagase)"	Shinichiro Aoki	Yoshimichi Hosoi	May 19, 1995
The next novel world is "The Tale of the Bamboo Cutter". The Jyarei Monster has changed Kaguya-hime into a baby, and the bamboo cutting couple is stuck on kitchen duty in a spaghetti restaurant without any break shifts. While Gao and the backup are stuck babysitting, it's up to the girls to help part time and lighten the load.
8	"Who's Afraid of the Big Bad Riding Hood (赤頭巾ちゃんに気をつけて, Akazukin-chan ni kiwotsukete)"	Toshimasa Suzuki	Kuniaki Yamashita	May 26, 1995
The next Novel World is "Little Red Riding Hood", and Little Red herself has toughened up to face evil from street delinquents to the big bad wolf. Yet Little Red is still a girl with a soft spot for cute things, especially to Urii. But while the Eto Rangers find the changes, something sinister beneath the Jyarei Monsters' hideout is the mastermind developing new forces to oversee results.
9	"The Astounding Beanstalk and the Giant Kingdom! (おどろき豆の木巨人の国!, Odoroki Mame no Ki Kyoujin no Kuni!)"	Masahito Otani	Kuniaki Yamashita	June 2, 1995
The next Novel World is "Jack and the Beanstalk". Jack is a total airhead much to the away team's nuisance, and the giant and his castle is replaced by giants in a bustling city. The only lead is the giant building giant with the "golden harp" and "golden egg" logo, and the Eto Rangers have to make sure Jack does not get himself crushed along the mission. Speaking of little things to be crushed, Bakumaru deals with his morning-hatred of spiders.
10	"Pinocchio's Golden Days!? (ピノキオ・黄金の日々!?, Pinokio, Ongon no Hibi!?)"	Takashi Asami	Masaharu Amiya	June 9, 1995
The next Novel World is "The Adventures of Pinocchio", where Pinocchio is now made of gold instead of wood. His nose still has the growing curse, but the more he lies, the more it makes him richer, and the Cricket assuring him that all good can come from wealth. With the assistance of Pinocchio's friend, Mary, can the Eto Rangers restore Pinocchio's true conscience?
11	"Snow White's Apple Panic! (白雪姫のアップルパニック!, Shirayukihime no Appuru Panikku!)"	Kazuya Miyazaki	Masashi Kubota	June 16, 1995
The next Novel World is the fairy tale of "Snow White", after picking up an unknown anomaly that bumped Kirinda during hyperspace. After determining the source is an "apple", the away team heads to investigate only to find its apples, apples, everywhere. They learn from Snow White and the 7 Macho Dwarves everything in the world is ruled by the "God of Apples". Meanwhile, the mastermind behind the monsters decides to find out who is disrupting her plans by sending a "fly on the wall".
12	"Nyanma's Challenge (妖魔王ニャンマーの挑戦, Jyareiou Nyanmaa no Chousen)"	Osamu Inoue	Hiroyuki Kawasaki	June 23, 1995
A Novel World has been darkened beyond any other, to the point where Kirinda cannot even identify why. Things seem deceptively simple for Bakumaru and the away team once they get inside. But things have turned for the worse as the evil ruler herself makes a surprise visit to Castle Aura herself and trying to assassinate Princess Aura in person!
13	"Big Trouble Here and There! (あっちでこっちで大ピンチ!, Acchi de Kocchi de Dai Pinchi!)"	Masahiko Murata	Hiroyuki Kawasaki	June 30, 1995
The dark ruler reveals herself as the Jyarei Queen, Nyanma, but Princess Aura manages to repel her away and the remaining Rangers hurrying back to aid the away team. Meanwhile, the strange darkness emerges as it takes over the wolf mecha terrorizes Bakumaru and the others, proving itself to be a more powerful foe than the Rangers ever faced before.
14	"The Strawman's Battle of the Trades! (わらしべ長者の交換合戦!, Warashibe Choujya no Koukan Gassen!)"	Masahito Otani	Yoshimichi Hosoi	July 7, 1995
The next Novel World is the "Straw Millionaire", where the world's timeline has been pushed forward into the future. Eventually finding the Straw Peasant, the story goes proceeding as told, but then finds himself caught in the middle of a bidding war. Can the Eto Rangers redirect the peasant's trading route before the next trader does?
15	"The Peter Pan Who Can't Fly (えっ? 飛べないピーターパン, Eeh? Tobenai Piitaa Pan)"	Tonokatsu Hideki	Kuniaki Yamashita	July 14, 1995
The next Novel World is "Peter Pan", where they boy who can fly has suddenly developed acrophobia. Things get complicated after Captain Hook kidnaps Wendy, and the pirate ship becomes an airship. It is up to the Eto Rangers to talk some sense into him.
16	"A Martial Arts Tournament! Bakumaru's Marriage? (大武術大会! バク丸が結婚?, Dai Bujyutsu Taikai! Bakumaru ga Kekkon?)"	Osamu Inoue	Yoshimichi Hosoi	July 21, 1995
The next Novel World is "The Mouse's Marriage", where its setting has been turned into a martial arts tournament. As the world's mouse groom, Bakumaru must win the tournament for the mouse bride's hand in marriage to preserve the story, a fact that Cream does not take well.
17	"Grandpa Aladdin and the Magic Lamp (アラジンじいさんと魔法のランプ, Arajin ji-chan to Mahou no Ranpu)"	Kazuya Miyazaki	Nobuaki Kishima	July 28, 1995
The next Novel World is "Aladdin and the Magic Lamp", where the Arabian Night setting has been changed to the Japanese Edo Period. A fact that Souffle could not help but faint from the unbearable sight. Bakumaru's group takes her to a medical clinic where they find the elderly Doctor Aladdin and his lovely granddaughter. How will Gao cooperate in the mission while finding himself head over heels with the granddaughter?
18	"Fierce! The Grateful "XX" (壮絶!××の恩返し, Sozetsu! Kepeke no Ongaishi)"	Hiroshi Kurimoto	Masashi Kubota	July 28, 1995
The next Novel World is "The Crane Maiden", where the story's timeline has set back to the Stone Age. Bakumaru's group investigate while finding themselves at home in the stone mansion of the elderly (cavemen) couple, and a young girl they have taken in named Tetsuko. Knowing Tetsuko as the crane maiden, the group trails and peek into her room, only to find a mammoth weaving instead! Another problem is the old man being a craving meat lover, whose specialty is mammoth. Can the team prevent the old man from peeking in time?
19	"The Weird, Weird House of Sweets (オカシなオカシなおかしのおうち, Okashina Okashina Okashi no Ouchi)"	Takashi Asami	Masaharu Amiya	August 11, 1995
The next Novel World is "Hansel and Gretel", where everything seems okay until Kirinda's usual carelessly-dropping-the-away-team-wherever has finally done it. He dropped them right on the witch, and knocking her out cold before even making the house of sweets. Can the team finish baking the house before Hansel and Gretel wander to there on time?
20	"The Puss in Boots Conspiracy (長靴をはいた猫の陰謀, Nagakutsu o haita neko no inbou)"	Masahito Otani	Kuniaki Yamashita	August 18, 1995
The next Novel World is "Puss in Boots", a world which is most unfitting for Bakumaru and his instinctive fear of cats. But things become much worse for the Eto Rangers, as it turns out the Jyarei Forces have taken full advantage of the world itself, and the Etorangers were the mice who walked right into a trap.
21	"Stand Up, Bakumaru! (よみがえれ バク丸!, Yomigaere Bakumaru!)"	Susumu Ishizaki	Kuniaki Yamashita	August 25, 1995
Owing to Gousen and Genen's trap, the Etorangers were forced to retreat and Kirinda heavily damaged to return to the Novel Worlds. Also on the critical verge of death, Princess Aura sends the Rangers on a mission to retrieve the Griffin Soul Stone (霊麟石, Reirinseki) in order to revive and power-up Kirinda. Meanwhile, Gao decides to mentally train Bakumaru to overcome his fear of cats, as his current condition will become the team's liability against Nyanma and her fearsome feline four.
22	"Power Up! New Kirinda (パワーアップ! ニューキリンダー, Pawaa Appu! Nyuu Kirindaa)"	Osamu Inoue	Nobuaki Kishima	September 1, 1995
With Bakumaru's mental training complete, he and Gao catch up with the team just in time to unlock the final trial to retrieve the Griffin Soul Stone. Now back into action, can Bakumaru achieve his revenge match against his fear of cats?
23	"The Blue Bird, Tart? (青い鳥のタルト?, Aoi Tori no Taruto?)"	Toshimasa Suzuki	Yoshimichi Hosoi	September 8, 1995
The next Novel World is "The Blue Bird", with starts off rough after the away team is divided upon arrival. With Tart as the story's "Blue Bird of Happiness", she and Gao must rendezvous back with the team who are with Tyltyl and Mytyl's group. Although with Bakumaru's fear of cats out of the way, the Etorangers' feline problems are not over as the next of the Jyarei Four Kings takes her turn.
24	"Souffle, Get Your Gun! (スフレよ銃をとれ!, Sufure yo, Jyuu o tore!)"	Tonokatsu Hideki	Masashi Kubota	September 15, 1995
The next Novel World is "The Boy Who Cried Wolf", where for once Bakumaru is not part of the away team. Problems have further arisen as the next Jyarei Monster has been upgraded with cybernetic parts. Can Souffle prove her worthiness for the team?
25	"Broadway Little Mermaid (ブロードウェイの人魚姫, Buroddowei no Ningyohime)"	Masahito Otani	Hiroyuki Kawasaki	September 22, 1995
The next Novel World is "The Little Mermaid", where its tragic ending is too sentimental, especially for Souffle. But thanks to the Jyarei Monster, the Little Mermaid's life has changed more positive and is now living her American Dream. Now the team must choose; for Mugen's sake or the Mermaid's happiness.
26	"Gold! Oh, Oh No! (金? のォ! おォのォ!, Kin? No! Ou No!)"	Takashi Asami	Yamashita Kuniaki	September 29, 1995
The next Novel World is "The Honest Woodcutter", where for the first time all 12 are the away team. Upon descending, all but Bakumaru and Nyorori land safe except the rest fell into the magic river and somehow turned into wood and not gold. Things have become problematic for them both after learning the alterations here are the values of gold and wood switched. Can Bakumaru and Nyorori protect their wooden friends from being valuable riches?
27	"The White Devil of the Desert (砂漠の白い悪魔, Sabaku no Shiroi Akuma)"	Osamu Inoue	Nobuaki Kishima	October 6, 1995
The next Novel World is "Moby Dick", where the Eto Rangers end up in a whale of a tale. The ocean has become a desert, Moby Dick is now "Moleby Dick", and Captain Ahab's obsessive grudge against the beast is driving his ship and crew to the brink of exhaustion. The Eto Rangers are going to have to assist the captain's fixation before getting himself stranded in the sandy wasteland.
28	"Annihilate Monk!? The Monkey-Crab War! (モンク抹殺!? さるかに合戦!, Monku Massatu!? Sarukani Gassen!)"	Hiroshi Kurimoto	Yoshimichi Hosoi	October 13, 1995
Monk has finally gone too far with his pranks and the other Eto Rangers (particularly Pochiro) are ready to give him what he deserves. After arriving in "The Crab and the Monkey" world, its "monkey see monkey do" for Monk when the last Jyarei Four King plans to use the world's story to eliminate him.
29	"Pakaracchi, Of Love and Youth (愛と青春のパカラッチ, Ai to Seishun no Pakaracchi)"	Tonokatsu Hideki	Masashi Kubota	October 27, 1995
The next Novel World is the horror story of "Frankenstein", only to discover the changes there are not even more horrific as it was. Other monsters from other stories have been included to throw the team off the trail. How can they find the Jyarei Monster with all these other monsters running around? The answer might lie in a young school girl named Francoise, who Pakaracchi has grown rather attached to.
30	"Birthday Present of Memories (想い出のバースディ・プレゼント, Omoide no Bassudei Puresento)"	Toshimasa Suzuki	Yamashita Kuniaki	November 3, 1995
While the Eto Rangers are enjoying their day off, Gao remains absent to deliver his girlfriend's birthday present who mysteriously disappeared. It was then through an unexpected encounter, Gao learns the shocking truth.
31	"Crisis! Nyanma's Trap (大ピンチ!ニャンマーの罠, Dai Pinchi! Nayanmaa no Wana)"	Masahito Otani	Yuichiro Takeda	November 10, 1995
Still shocked in disbelief, Gao could not concentrate on his Ranger work. When the Ranger's next mission is in "The Town Musicians of Bremen" World, it was expected for Gao to fulfill the feline role, but Gao can already realize something else. Meanwhile, Nyanma launches a new weapon to keep Kirinda and the other Rangers busy while endangering the away team.
32	"Taking Back the Lost Memories (失われた記憶をとりもどせ, Ushinawareta Kioku o Torimodose)"	Takashi Asami	Yuichiro Takeda	November 17, 1995
Nyanma's trap has successfully divided and conquered the Eto Rangers into a corner. The "Town Musicians of Bremen" World is slowly disappearing into the darkness, and who knows what outcome befalls the away team after failing to return under the time limit. Can the remaining Rangers save the Novel World and their fallen teammates from their fate?
33	"Nyanma's Sad Past (哀しきニャンマーの過去, Kanashiki Nyanmaa no Kakou)"	Shinichi Watanabe	Kuniaki Yamashita	November 24, 1995
Gao's distraction towards the truth keeps pulling the team down until Tart (who accidentally overheard) decides to confront Princess Aura about the matter. There the Princess finally unfolds to the Rangers of what happened during the Zodiac race. A sad truth about a little cat girl's broken heart.
34	"Kirinda's Shocking Origin (衝撃! キリンダー誕生の秘密, Shougeki! Kirindaa Tanjyou no Himitsu)"	Hiroshi Kurimoto	Kuniaki Yamashita	December 8, 1995
Part 2 continues of Princess Aura's story. As the Rangers listen of what happened to Chocolat after the Zodiac race, they learn of another tragedy that befallen to one of their own but still exists as their current comrade.
35	"The Final Battle! Entering the Yoma Castle!! (最終決戦! 妖魔城へ突入せよ!!, Saishuu Kessen! Youmajyou he Totsunyuu seyo!!)"	Goro Taniguchi	Masashi Kubota	December 15, 1995
Princess Aura has fallen, and the evil queen, Nyanma uses this opportunity to launch an all-out assault on the Novel Worlds. The Rangers know too well it is impossible to save all the worlds at once. Thus the only solution is to strike the problem at the root; in the enemy stronghold.
36	"Unleash! Zodiac Union Beam (はなて! 十二戦支合体光線, Hanate! Juuni Senshi Gattai Kousen)"	Masahito Otani	Yoshimichi Hosoi	December 22, 1995
Kirinda and the Eto Rangers discover that the enemy stronghold is actually the previous Mugen which sank into the ocean long ago. To confront Nyanma, they descend the Dark Novel Pole to have Rouran awaiting them in the Dark "Urashima Tarō" World. As the whole team proved to be no match against the improved Rouran, the Great Spirit God, Goal appears to bestow the Rangers a powerful gift.
37	"Jyuken Rises! (めざめよ珠献!, Mezameyo Jyuken!)"	Takashi Asami	Masaharu Amiya	January 12, 1996
The Eto Rangers have defeated Rouran, but at a terrible price costing two of their own. But despite their loss, they have unexpectedly gained another – one who proves to be the key in the final approach towards Nyanma herself.
38	"To the end of Rage and Hate! (怒りと憎しみのはてに!, Ikari to Nikushimi no Hateni!)"	Toshimasa Suzuki	Kuniaki Yamashita	January 19, 1996
The Rangers have reached the island of Dark Mugen, where a full-powered Nyanma continues to finish them off one by one. All seems hopeless with only Bakumaru, Cream and Urii remaining, and it is up to them to convince Nyanma the truth of her beliefs.
39	"We're always seeing you (いつだってキミに会える, Itsudatte Kimi ni Aeru)"	Hideo Shimosaka	Mayori Sekijima	January 26, 1996
The Jyarei Goddess Bagi has revealed herself and her ambitions to bring apocalypse to Mugen and all of humanity's hopes and dreams. Being the only fighting force left, Bakumaru challenges the Bagi-powered Black Kirinda in one last battle. The final showdown begins where every story ends with love, peace, and understanding. A long adventure ends and a new one begins!
