= List of Puzzle & Dragons X episodes =

Puzzle & Dragons X is a Japanese anime series based on the Nintendo 3DS game of the same name. It premiered on July 4, 2016. The opening theme is "WE ARE GO" by UVERworld, while the ending theme is "ColorFULLCombo!" (カラーFULLコンボ！) by Shiori Tomita. From episode 27 to 51, the second opening theme is "Colors" by Lenny code fiction, while the ending theme is "Puzzle" by Natsume Mito, but it debuted in episode 30. From episodes 52 to 89, the third opening is "Montage" by Porno Graffitti, while the ending theme is "Colorful Jump" by J*Dee'Z.

== Episode list ==
No.	Official English title (Note: All English titles are taken from Crunchyroll.) Original Japanese title	Original release date
1	"Drop Impact"; Transliteration: "Doroppu inpakuto" (Japanese: ドロップ・インパクト)	July 4, 2016
Lance, a top-class Dragon Caller, and his Tamadra Devi, appear in Vienna City chasing what appears to be a meteorite. Ace, Rena's son, hears a voice calling him by name several times, and finding an egg with a star shape on it, he brings it home. A monster attacks the city, affected by Drop Impact, and Lance tries to stop it using his monsters, while an Devi teaches an agitated Ace about. During the battle, Ace is able to help Lance by drawing water Drops by listening to the egg, when Lance is unable to draw them out himself.
2	"Cross-On"; Transliteration: "Kurosuon" (Japanese: クロスオン)	July 11, 2016
Lance manages to calm down the monster, but the SDF choose the same moment to start attacking it - which enrages the monster again. Lance continues fighting and as Ace is feeling desperate, the egg, almost hatching, encourages his again to get the Drops, using which, the monster is finally dispersed. The egg hatches into a white Tamadra called Tamazo. Later in the day, Ace tries to call Drops, but is unsuccessful. A stranger appears before him and advises to go to the Dragon Museum. He meets a young boy, Charo, a Dragon Caller enthusiast. And he also meets Lance, who has followed Tamazo, to take it with himself. But Tamazo returns to Ace. They meet Garnet, another Dragon Caller, who challenges them to a fight, but ends up retreating after seeing Ace gather Drops, but she later tells Sonia (the stranger from earlier) it was because she didn't want to battle in the middle of the city). Meanwhile Rena converses with someone over the phone, telling them that Ace was carrying an egg similar to the one King had. The person on the other end advises her to send Ace to the Dragoza island. Meanwhile, Tamazo is kidnapped by a group of people.
3	"Operation Tamazo-Rescue"; Transliteration: "Tamazō dakkan dai sakusen" (Japanese: タマゾー奪還大作戦)	July 18, 2016
The kidnappers turn out to be SDF. Ace and Charo try to rescue Tamazo, while Lance wastes most of his time on Govt officials, who just make him go around in circles. Ace and Charo manage to rescue Tamazo following his instructions, and an irritated Lance blasts his way into the base too, only to find the cage empty. Charo convinces Ace to become a Dragon Caller along with him, and they leave for Dragoza island.
4	"Dragoza Island"; Transliteration: "Doragōza shima" (Japanese: ドラゴーザ島)	July 25, 2016
Ace visits his grandmother with Charo. There he helps out a monster called Ouka who later turns into an Egg Drop and becomes his first monster.
5	"Soul Armor"; Transliteration: "Souruāmā" (Japanese: ソウルアーマー)	August 1, 2016
Searching for a Soul Armour to become stronger, Ace is repeatedly tricked before helping out an Ancient Dragon Knight, which becomes his Soul Armour.
6	"Mapple Tree"; Transliteration: "Maringo no ki" (Japanese: マリンゴの木)	August 8, 2016
Ace becomes full of himself and goes to battle a big monster. But Lance comes to rescue him when he terribly fails.
7	"The Path to Guild Dragon Caller"; Transliteration: "Girudo ryū e no michi" (Japanese: ギルド龍喚士への道)	August 15, 2016
Ace learns his lesson and starts to train properly to become a Dragon Caller with Garnet's mentor Herriot and her twin, Morgan. Herriot gives him an Egg Drop after he finishes training. Ace and Charo attend the Guid Dragon Caller exams. He gets a Blue Troll Egg Drop during the exams and his Ancient Dragon Knight evolves into a Dark Dragon Knight. Someone from the shadows challenges him.
8	"King's Footsteps"; Transliteration: "Kingu no ashi ato" (Japanese: キングのあしあと)	August 22, 2016
Ace has to fight Morgan as the final test. Even though he wins, he fails the test as he was assisted by Charo, against the rules. Lance proclaims to Vahaton and Ace that only the Dragonoids can save the planet. Ace and Charo leave the island to learn more.
9	"A Man from Geyser"; Transliteration: "Gaizā kara kita otoko" (Japanese: ガイザーから来た男)	August 29, 2016
10	"Ancient of Fire, Eldora"; Transliteration: "Hi no korō erudora" (Japanese: 火の古老エルドラ)	September 5, 2016
11	"Wood City Libria"; Transliteration: "Ki no machi riburia" (Japanese: 木の街リブリア)	September 12, 2016
12	"The New Ancient"; Transliteration: "Atarashī korō" (Japanese: 新しい古老)	September 19, 2016
13	"Guild Dragon Caller's Exam"; Transliteration: "Girudo nyūdan shiken" (Japanese: ギルド入団試験)	September 26, 2016
14	"Ace Returns"; Transliteration: "Kaettekita ēsu" (Japanese: 帰ってきたエース)	October 3, 2016
15	"Entetsu's Soul"; Transliteration: "Entetsu no tamashī (Sōru)" (Japanese: エンテツの魂（ソウル）)	October 10, 2016
16	"Charo and the Haunted Forest"; Transliteration: "Charo to obake no mori" (Japanese: チャロとお化けの森)	October 17, 2016
17	"The White Dragon"; Transliteration: "Shiroki ryū" (Japanese: 白き龍)	October 24, 2016
18	"The Promise in the Darkness"; Transliteration: "Yami ni kagayaku chikai" (Japanese: 闇に輝く誓い)	October 31, 2016
19	"The Secret of Drops"; Transliteration: "Doroppu no himitsu" (Japanese: ドロップの秘密)	November 7, 2016
20	"Tiger's Tough Time"; Transliteration: "Taigā wa tsurai yo" (Japanese: タイガーはつらいよ)	November 14, 2016
21	"E-mail from Ace"; Transliteration: "Ēsu kara no mēru" (Japanese: エースからのメール)	November 21, 2016
22	"Our Youthful Valkyrie"; Transliteration: "Watashi ga seishun no vuarukirī" (Japanese: 私が青春のヴァルキリー)	November 28, 2016
23	"Breaking Into SDF's Secret Base"; Transliteration: "Sen'nyū! SDF himitsu kichi" (Japanese: 潜入！SDF 秘密基地)	December 5, 2016
24	"The One Protected by Gods"; Transliteration: "Kami ni okasa reta mono" (Japanese: 神に冒された者)	December 12, 2016
25	"Nightmare in Light City"; Transliteration: "Hikari no gainoakumu" (Japanese: 光の街の悪夢)	December 19, 2016
26	"Surviving the Storm"; Transliteration: "Arashi o koero" (Japanese: 嵐をこえろ)	December 26, 2016
27	"Battle Cup Begins"; Transliteration: "Batoru kappu kaimaku!" (Japanese: バトルカップ開幕！)	January 9, 2017
28	"Soul Brave Activated"; Transliteration: "Sōrubureibu hatsudō!" (Japanese: ソウルブレイブ発動！)	January 16, 2017
29	"Valkyrie Awakens"; Transliteration: "Vuarukirī no mezame" (Japanese: ヴァルキリーの目覚め)	January 23, 2017
30	"Our Friendship Battle"; Transliteration: "Oretachi no yūjō batoru!" (Japanese: 俺たちの友情バトル！)	January 30, 2017
31	"Dragon Caller of Light and Dark"; Transliteration: "Hikari to yami no ryū kanshi" (Japanese: 光と闇の龍喚士)	February 6, 2017
32	"Twin's Memories"; Transliteration: "Futago no kioku" (Japanese: 双子の記憶)	February 13, 2017
33	"Appalling! Kroell's Whip"; Transliteration: "Hidō! Kuroeru no muchi katachi" (Japanese: 非道！クロエルの鞭形)	February 20, 2017
34	"The Strongest of All Dragon Callers"; Transliteration: "Saikyō no ryū kanshi" (Japanese: 最強の龍喚士)	February 27, 2017
35	"Ace vs Sturgeon"; Transliteration: "Ēsu vs sutājon" (Japanese: エースvsスタージョン)	March 6, 2017
36	"Battle! Ace vs Lance"; Transliteration: "Gekitotsu! Ēsu vs Ransu" (Japanese: 激突！エースvsランス)	March 13, 2017
37	"Intense Battle! Lance vs Ace"; Transliteration: "Gekitō! Ransu vs Ēsu" (Japanese: 激闘！ランスvsエース)	March 20, 2017
38	"The Final Battle"; Transliteration: "Saigo no kessen" (Japanese: 最後の決戦)	March 27, 2017
39	"Their Separate Ways"; Transliteration: "Sorezore no tabidachi" (Japanese: それぞれの旅立ち)	April 3, 2017
40	"A New Threat"; Transliteration: "Aratanaru kyōi" (Japanese: あらたなる脅威)	April 10, 2017
41	"The Stolen Egg Drop"; Transliteration: "Ubawareta eggudoroppu" (Japanese: 奪われたエッグドロップ)	April 17, 2017
42	"Pride of Libria"; Transliteration: "Riburia no Hokori" (Japanese: 森の誇り)	April 24, 2017
43	"The Shadow Attacking Zelemony"; Transliteration: "Zeremonī o osou kage" (Japanese: ゼレモニを襲う影)	May 1, 2017
44	"Challenge from the Darkness"; Transliteration: "Shikkoku no chōsen" (Japanese: 漆黒の挑戦)	May 8, 2017
45	"Protect Exscion"; Transliteration: "Ekushion o Mamore!" (Japanese: エクシオンを守れ!)	May 15, 2017
46	"The Crack in the Round Table"; Transliteration: "Hibiwareta entaku" (Japanese: ひびわれた円卓)	May 22, 2017
47	"Angene's Wish"; Transliteration: "Anjīnu no inori" (Japanese: アンジーヌの祈り)	May 29, 2017
48	"Dragon's Graveyard"; Transliteration: "Ryū no hakaba" (Japanese: 竜の墓場)	June 5, 2017
49	"God's Fort"; Transliteration: "Kami no toride" (Japanese: 神の砦)	June 12, 2017
50	"The Dragonoid's Village, Stella"; Transliteration: "Ryūjin no sato sutetora" (Japanese: 竜人の里ステラ)	June 19, 2017
51	"The Two Dragons"; Transliteration: "Futatsu no ryū" (Japanese: 二つの龍)	June 26, 2017
52	"Under the Three Moons"; Transliteration: "Mittsu no tsuki no shita de" (Japanese: 三つの月の下で)	July 3, 2017
53	"Grand Battle Cup Begins!"; Transliteration: "Gurando batorukappu kaimaku!" (Japanese: グランド・バトルカップ開幕！)	July 10, 2017
54	"Stella's Secret"; Transliteration: "Sutera no himitsu" (Japanese: ステラの秘密)	July 17, 2017
55	"Mysterious Dragon Callers"; Transliteration: "Nazo no ryū Kan Tachi" (Japanese: 謎の龍喚士たち)	July 24, 2017
56	"Mission of God"; Transliteration: "Kami no shimei" (Japanese: 神の使命)	July 31, 2017
57	"Fierce Battle Against the Darkness"; Transliteration: "Yami to no gekisen" (Japanese: 闇との激戦)	August 7, 2017
58	"The Days in Libria"; Transliteration: "Riburia no hibi" (Japanese: リブリアの日々)	August 14, 2017
59	"Fragment of the Star"; Transliteration: "Hoshi no ka kera" (Japanese: ほしのかけら)	August 21, 2017
60	"The Revealed Secret"; Transliteration: "Abaka reta himitsu" (Japanese: 暴かれた秘密)	August 28, 2017
61	"Ace's Final Showdown"; Transliteration: "Kessen no ēsu" (Japanese: 決戦のエース)	September 4, 2017
62	"Lance's Roar"; Transliteration: "Ransu hōkō" (Japanese: ランス咆哮)	September 11, 2017
63	"Jest's Ambition"; Transliteration: "Jesuto no yabō" (Japanese: ジェストの野望)	September 18, 2017
64	"The Savoir"; Transliteration: "Kyūsai-sha (kyū sai sha)" (Japanese: 救済者（きゅうさいしゃ）)	September 25, 2017
65	"Travel Destinations with Tamatama"; Transliteration: "Tamatama ikudarou kon'na shima" (Japanese: タマタマ行くならこんな島)	October 2, 2017
66	"Stella Awakens"; Transliteration: "Sutera no mezame" (Japanese: ステラの目覚め)	October 9, 2017
67	"Pure Light Sun Deity"; Transliteration: "Kyokkō taiyō-shin (ki ~yousouuiyoushin)" (Japanese: 極光太陽神（きょっこうたいようしん）)	October 16, 2017
68	"Golden Wings"; Transliteration: "Kin'iro no tsubasa (Kon jiki no Tsubasa)" (Japanese: 金色の翼（こんじきのつばさ）)	October 23, 2017
69	"Sisters"; Transliteration: "Shimai" (Japanese: 姉妹)	October 30, 2017
70	"Future of Crocus"; Transliteration: "Kurokkasu no mirai" (Japanese: クロッカスの未来)	November 6, 2017
71	"Beast Academy SOS"; Transliteration: "Yajū gakuen esuōesu" (Japanese: 野獣学園SOS)	November 13, 2017
72	"Angry Tiger"; Transliteration: "Angurī taigā" (Japanese: アングリー・タイガー)	November 20, 2017
73	"The Green Guardian"; Transliteration: "Midori no mamorigami" (Japanese: 緑の守り神)	November 27, 2017
74	"Sonia and the Tree of Life"; Transliteration: "Sonia to inochi no ki" (Japanese: ソニアと命の木)	December 4, 2017
75	"Memories of Lance"; Transliteration: "Tsuigeki no ransu" (Japanese: 追憶のランス)	December 11, 2017
76	"The Last Reversion"; Transliteration: "Saigo no genshi-ka" (Japanese: 最後の原始化)	December 18, 2017
Lance refuses to let go of the star fragment, instead calling it a true form of a Dragonoid. Devi manages to reach them, when Ace fights Lance, but blocks Lance's attack by flying in front of Ace.
77	"The Frozen Sun"; Transliteration: "Itetsuku taiyō" (Japanese: 凍てつく太陽)	December 25, 2017
While Ace and Lance fight, a gigantic Drop Impact occurs at Crocus, but the members of Dominion, now after a change of mind, calling themselves as Dragon Callers, manage to stop it, thus saving the city. Lance and Ace fight even further, and Ana tells Ace that for Lance to return, the Star Fragment must be destroyed completely, but his heart might also be crushed in the process. Ace finally manages to defeat Lance and also crush the star fragment. As Lance falls into the sea, he is rescued by his monsters and Devi, whom he hugs and finally apologizes to. The city of Crocus celebrates its freedom, while a disappointed Jest goes to a dark room, where an unknown character is present.
78	"Rescuing Torlie"; Transliteration: "Tōrīe Dakkan" (Japanese: トーリエ奪還)	January 8, 2018
Torlie is transferred from under the direct supervision of Jest, as he is physically weakened under torture and interrogation. When the news reaches him, the Ancient Vahaton laments being unable to rescue him. However the conversation is overheard by Charo, who decides to rescue Torlie by himself. Come dawn, everyone finds Charo missing along with a carrier dragon. Ace and Tamazo go after him after learning the truth. Meanwhile, Charo is nearly caught by the Dominion, but escapes with help of Ansel, a well known chef, who is also serving food to Torlie to help him recover. Together, they rescue Torlie, and Charo also brings along Klien, who has had a change of heart. Torlie and Klien go to Libria while Charo, Ace and Tamazo return.
79	"Resolve of Justice"; Transliteration: "Seigi no ketsudan" (Japanese: 正義の決断)	January 15, 2018
Eldora finally awakens, but needs to rest more. So Ace, along with Tiger and Garnet head to Geyser to free it from Dominion's control. On the way, they find a fort, which has a device to amplify the power of they ley lines and with this as a threat, the Dominion have managed to take the whole city hostage. Aget appears to help them, but the gang are not sure whether to trust him. They decide to follow him, since they don't have any other plans. Aget tells them that he became a 'Super hero of Justice' after being inspired by a comic hero, but decided that his own desires are Justice, after going through a series of failures. During the whole time, he turns out to be quite fickle, switching sides between the Dominion and the Ace & friends, while being totally unaware of what everyone else is saying. Ace and the gang somehow manage to destroy the fort. Once out, they figure out that in the meanwhile, Kroell has figured out the Guild's secret hideout and has gone there to capture Eldora. Ace and the gang hurry there, followed by a completely unwitting Aget. Kroell declines Aget's support while badmouthing him, which enflares Aget, and he defeats Kroell. Ace and the gang turn to the next city to release from Dominion's control.
80	"Resolve of Zelemony"; Transliteration: "Zeremoni no kakugo" (Japanese: ゼレモニの覚悟)	January 22, 2018
Kroell makes a contract with Lucifer, gaining his power in exchange for his body and soul. Zelemony's people are fighting the Dominion. Kroell takes Margan with him, to make her into a scapegoat - he tells the Zelemony's townspeople that she was the one who killed, so that the people believe in Dominion again. Mere figures out that Morgan is accepting the blame in exchange for Jest to not attack the city. The people decide to have Morgan executed for her crimes, but Ace and the gang try to stop them. As they fight against Kroell, he turns out with the upper hand, until Morgan is joined by Harriot, who manage to defeat him. Kroell retreats, inviting them to Jest's place.
81	"Head to the Tower of Light"; Transliteration: "Hikari no tō o mezase!" (Japanese: 光の塔をめざせ！)	January 29, 2018
As Ace prepares to face Jest, the is joined by everyone else. They all proceed to Exscion, where each member is forced to stop at a level to fight monsters there. Finally only Ace remains, but the one he finds at the top is not Jest, but Kroell. As the fighting continues, Kroell manages to hurt Ace enough, for Jest to come out in his Dragonoid form and try to consume Ace. As everyone watches helpless, Daphness's darkness appears to try to consume Jest. However Kroell tries to help Jest, even at the cost of his own soul being consumed. Just as it seems like Ace will be consumed, Lucifer separates from Kroell, since he wouldn't get Kroell's soul, Jest is overwhelmed by Daphness's darkness. Ace is saved as Jest and Kroell vanish. All the monster egg drops start returning to their owners.
82	"A Starless Night"; Transliteration: "Hoshi no nai yoru" (Japanese: 星のない夜)	February 5, 2018
83	"Destroyer of Peace"; Transliteration: "Heiwa o kowasu mono" (Japanese: 平和を壊す者)	February 12, 2018
84	"King of Hell"; Transliteration: "Majin" (Japanese: 魔神)	February 19, 2018
85	"Ultimate Existence"; Transliteration: "Kyūkyoku no sonzai" (Japanese: 究極の存在)	February 26, 2018
86	"Ace and Lance"; Transliteration: "Ēsu to ransu" (Japanese: エースとランス)	March 5, 2018
87	"When the Light Goes Out"; Transliteration: "Hikari no tsuieru toki" (Japanese: 光の潰える時)	March 12, 2018
88	"King"; Transliteration: "Kingu" (Japanese: キング)	March 19, 2018
89	"Terra Dragon"; Transliteration: "Teradoragon" (Japanese: テラドラゴン)	March 26, 2018
