= List of Grand Blue Dreaming episodes =

Cover of the first Blu-ray release featuring Chisa Kotegawa

Grand Blue Dreaming is an anime series adapted from the manga series, written by Kenji Inoue and illustrated by Kimitake Yoshioka. It is produced by Zero-G, directed and written by Shinji Takamatsu, with Takamatsu also handling sound direction, and Hideoki Kusama designing the characters.

== Series overview ==
Season	Episodes	Originally released	
Season	Episodes	First released	Last released
1	12	July 14, 2018	September 18, 2018
2	12	July 8, 2025	September 23, 2025
3	12	July 7, 2026	September 22, 2026

== Episodes ==
=== Season 1 (2018) ===
No. overall	No. in season	Title	Directed by	Written by	Storyboarded by	Original release date (Note: MBS listed the series premiere on July 13, 2018 at 26:25, which is effectively July 14 at 2:25 a.m. JST.)
1	1	"Deep Blue"; Transliteration: "Dīpu Burū" (Japanese: ディープブルー)	Shinji Takamatsu	Shinji Takamatsu	Shinji Takamatsu	July 14, 2018
2	2	"Underwater"; Transliteration: "Mizu no Naka de" (Japanese: 水の中で)	Atsuko Tonomizu	Shinji Takamatsu	Toshizô Kida	July 21, 2018
3	3	"A New World"; Transliteration: "Shin Sekai" (Japanese: 新世界)	Keisuke Nishijima	Shinji Takamatsu	Takeshi Kumamoto	July 28, 2018
4	4	"The Male Beauty Pageant"; Transliteration: "Dan Kon" (Japanese: 男コン)	Ryūta Kawahara	Shinji Takamatsu	Hiroshi Kugimiya	August 4, 2018
5	5	"Too Late"; Transliteration: "Ato no Matsuri" (Japanese: 後の祭り)	Yoshihisa Matsumoto	Shinji Takamatsu	Yoshihiro Takamoto	August 11, 2018
6	6	"First Buddy"; Transliteration: "Hatsu Badi" (Japanese: 初バディ)	Masaki Utsunomiya	Shinji Takamatsu	Hiroyuki Ochi	August 18, 2018
7	7	"Doubles"; Transliteration: "Daburusu" (Japanese: ダブルス)	Takashi Kobayashi	Shinji Takamatsu	Toshizô Kida	August 25, 2018
8	8	"Men's Cocktails"; Transliteration: "Otoko no Kakuteru" (Japanese: 男のカクテル)	Yoshihisa Matsumoto	Shinji Takamatsu	Yōichi Ueda	September 1, 2018
9	9	"Shopping"; Transliteration: "Ōsama Gemu" (Japanese: 王様ゲーム)	Atsuko Tonomizu	Kenji Inoue	Koibumi Koiwai	September 8, 2018
10	10	"Arrival in Okinawa"; Transliteration: "Okinawa Jōriku" (Japanese: 沖縄上陸)	Nanako Shimazaki	Shinji Takamatsu	Hitomi Tsuruta	September 15, 2018
11	11	"You Have the Wrong Idea"; Transliteration: "Gokaina Ndaga" (Japanese: 誤解なんだが)	Tarou Iwasaki	Shinji Takamatsu	Miyana Okita	September 22, 2018
12	12	"Otori"; Transliteration: "Otōri" (Japanese: オトーリ)	Yōichi Ueda	Shinji Takamatsu	Masaki Utsunomiya	September 29, 2018

=== Season 2 (2025) ===
No. overall	No. in season	Title	Directed by	Storyboarded by	Original release date (Note: Tokyo MX and BS11 listed the second season's premiere on July 7 at 24:30, which is effectively July 8 at 12:30 a.m. JST.)
13	1	"Sister"; Transliteration: "Imōto" (Japanese: 妹)	Shinji Sano	Fumikazu Satō	July 8, 2025
14	2	"Brother"; Transliteration: "Ani" (Japanese: 兄)	Takeshi Toda	Toshizô Kida	July 15, 2025
15	3	"Image Game"; Transliteration: "Inshō Gēmu" (Japanese: 印象ゲーム)	Takeshi Toda	Toshizô Kida	July 22, 2025
16	4	"Ticket Scramble"; Transliteration: "Chiketto Sōdatsu-sen" (Japanese: チケット争奪戦)	Kentarō Mizuno	Nobuhiro Takamoto	July 29, 2025
17	5	"First Time at a Women's University"; Transliteration: "Hajimete no Joshidai" (Japanese: はじめての女子大)	Shigenori Awai	Shinichi Watanabe	August 5, 2025
18	6	"Back to the All-Girls College"; Transliteration: "Futatabi no Joshidai" (Japanese: 再びの女子大)	Arata Nishizuki	Shinichi Watanabe	August 12, 2025
19	7	"The Charpy Impact Test"; Transliteration: "Sharupī Shōgeki Shiken" (Japanese: シャルピー衝撃試験)	Keita Nakano & Kentarō Mizuno	Kō Matsuzono	August 19, 2025
19	7	"School Camping for Adults"; Transliteration: "Otona no Rinkan Gakkō" (Japanese: 大人の林間学校)	Keita Nakano & Kentarō Mizuno	Kō Matsuzono	August 19, 2025
20	8	"Coworkers"; Transliteration: "Baito Nakama" (Japanese: バイト仲間)	Kentarō Mizuno	Nobuhiro Takamoto	August 26, 2025
21	9	"Are You In Love?"; Transliteration: "Suki na no?" (Japanese: 好きなの?)	Hiroki Sakamoto	Fumikazu Satō	September 2, 2025
22	10	"Movie Date"; Transliteration: "Eiga Dēto" (Japanese: 映画デート)	Hidehiko Kadota	Fumikazu Satō	September 9, 2025
23	11	"Let's Go to an Uninhabited Island!"; Transliteration: "Mujintō e Ikō!" (Japanese: 無人島へ行こう!)	Tsurumi Mukōyama	Shinichi Watanabe	September 16, 2025
24	12	"Now We're Even"; Transliteration: "Kore de Chara" (Japanese: これでチャラ)	Kentarō Mizuno	Yōichi Ueda	September 23, 2025

=== Season 3 (2026) ===
No. overall	No. in season	Title	Directed by	Storyboarded by	Original release date (Note: Tokyo MX and BS11 listed the third season's premiere on July 6 at 24:00, which is effectively July 7 at midnight JST.)
25	1	"Unfinished Business"; Transliteration: "Yari Nokoshi" (Japanese: やり残し)	Keita Nakano & Takumi Fukasawa	Fumikazu Satō	July 7, 2026
26	2	"Homecoming"; Transliteration: "Kisei" (Japanese: 帰省)	Unknown	TBA	July 14, 2026
