= List of Fairy Gone episodes =

Fairy Gone
- Cover art of the first Blu-ray compilation, featuring Marlya Noel and her fairy Ash Cloud.
- No. of episodes: 24

Release
- Original network: Tokyo MX, BS11, MBS, AT-X
- Original release: April 7 – December 22, 2019

Fairy Gone is a Japanese anime television series produced by P.A. Works. The series was directed by Kenichi Suzuki and written by Ao Jūmonji, with Haruhisa Nakata and Takako Shimizu handling character designs. Japanese musician Know-Name (stylized as [K]NoW_NAME) composed the music and performed the series' opening theme song "Knock On the Core", as well as the second opening theme song "Still Standing".

The series aired as a split-cour, with the first half airing on Tokyo MX, BS11, MBS, and AT-X from April 7 to June 23, 2019, while the second half aired from October 6 to December 22, 2019.

Funimation licensed the series; the English dub premiered on April 28, 2019.

== Episode list ==
| No. | Title | Original release date |
|---|---|---|
Part 1
| 1 | "Ash Covered Girl"; Transliteration: "Haikaburi no Shōjo" (Japanese: 灰かぶりの少女) | April 7, 2019 |
Years ago, the continent of Eastald was engulfed in the War of Unification, which saw the use of "Fairy Soldiers", humans capable of summoning Fairies to battle for them. During the war, the village of Suna is destroyed, separating two girls, Marlya and Veronica. The war ends with Eastald being united under the nation of Zesskia. Years later, Marlya joins the Mafia in hopes of finding Veronica and meets Free, the head of security for an auction to sell a page from the Black Fairy Tome. Suddenly, Veronica attacks the auction and steals the page, prompting Marlya and Free to pursue her. In the confusion, a fairy is accidentally set free and it merges with Marlya, causing her to have flashbacks to her life in Suna, and how Veronica vowed revenge for the village's destruction. When Marlya regains consciousness, both Veronica and Free have unleashed their Fairies to battle. In the heat of the moment, Marlya inadvertently summons her Fairy, which intervenes in the fight and gives Veronica the chance to escape. Free reveals he is actually working for a government organization called Dorothea, whose purpose is to police illegal Fairy users. As an illegal Fairy user herself now, Marlya is given the ultimatum of being arrested or joining Dorothea. Marlya agrees to join in hopes of being able to confront Veronica again. Meanwhile, Veronica turns in the stolen page to her superior, who informs her it is fake.
| 2 | "Wolf Collar and Swan Feathers"; Transliteration: "Ōkami no Kubiwa to Hakuchō no Hane" (Japanese: 狼の首輪と白鳥の羽) | April 14, 2019 |
After Marlya is recruited into Dorothea, Free makes his report to Nein, the director of Dorothea, of his suspicion that Marlya has been directly possessed by a Fairy rather than having a Fairy organ transplanted into her, the normal method. Nein points out Fairy possession shouldn't be possible and decides to hide this information. Free and Marlya head out to the region of Dipre to investigate the illegal sale of artificial Fairies. There, they meet up with fellow Dorothea agents Serge and Klara. Observing the sale, Klara notices one of the men involved is a Fairy Soldier. Free takes Marlya to investigate the Fairy Soldier while Serge and Klara remain to watch the sale. Free confronts the Fairy Soldier and recognizes him as Wolfran, a comrade during the Unification War. After a brief skirmish, Wolfran escapes, but not before killing all of the traders to prevent them from revealing information about the buyer. Later, Wolfran visits a pair of graves, presumably those of his wife and child.
| 3 | "Greedy Fox and Lying Crow"; Transliteration: "Yokubari Kitsune to Usotsuki Karasu" (Japanese: 欲ばりキツネと嘘つきカラス) | April 21, 2019 |
Free remarks how Fairies were practically hunted to extinction to produce Fairy Soldiers, of which only 17 are known to have survived the Unification War. It is also confirmed Wolfran's family was killed during the war. In the present, Free and Marlya are tasked by the Ministry of Fairies to visit the Fairy scholar Cain to investigate reports the Black Fairy Tome, which contains information about "Fairy possession", has been found. They head to Timoon, where they encounter Sweetie, one of Free's contacts from the Gui Carlin mafia. Together, they meet Cain and his associate Damien while another of Free's mafia contacts, Axel, looks to find a way to steal the Tome for the Arcame mafia. Axel manages to steal the Tome page, causing Free and Marlya to race against Sweetie to recover it. However, the entire chase is a ploy set up by Damien and Veronica by using the fake Black Fairy Tome page to flush out the groups seeking the real Tome. Sweetie shoots Axel, forcing him to give up the Tome but Free arrives and battles her for it, with Sweetie revealing that she is also a Fairy Soldier. Meanwhile, Axel lies in an alley dying from his wound when an unknown man approaches him.
| 4 | "Impatient Housekeeper and Selfish Artist"; Transliteration: "Sekkachi Kaseifu to Wagamama Geijutsuka" (Japanese: せっかち家政婦とわがまま芸術家) | April 28, 2019 |
Free and Sweetie fight, which ends in Free's victory after Marlya helps him and Sweetie leaves. Marlya dreams of how Suna was destroyed by an army led by Ray Dawn. She and Veronica had the ability to see fairy primitives without help. Patricia, a friend of Sweetie's and fellow Gui Carlin member, meets with her. Free and Marlya return to Cain and Damien, who are evasive as to how they got the Black Tome page and deny knowing a Veronica. Marlya doesn't believe them. Patricia and her partner Jonathan steal the Black Tome page after they leave and Marlya and Free follow them down a passageway under an abandoned Church. They are ambushed in a crypt and Patricia lures Free away before attacking with her Fairy, leaving Jonathan to capture Marlya. A potent knife-wielder, he chases Marlya back into the Church and wounds her with a poison knife that prevents her from summoning her fairy. As he is about to capture her, Veronica leaps through the Church's window and lands in front of Marlya, drawing her knife against Jonathan.
| 5 | "Black Moon and Lost Child's Song"; Transliteration: "Kuroi Tsuki to Mayoigo no Uta" (Japanese: 黒い月と迷い子の唄) | May 5, 2019 |
In the past, Veronica attempts to assassinate Ray Dawn, the man responsible for Suna's destruction, but fails when he uses his Fairy against her. In the present, Veronica attacks Jonathan, but has difficulty getting past his Fairy, having been struck a glancing blow and become tainted by the same poison that prevents her from summoning her fairy. Not wanting to leave Veronica to do all the fighting, Marlya forces her fairy to appear and it launches a fire attack at Jonathan, trapping him and allowing Marlya and Veronica to escape the church. In the catacombs, Free is able to get the upper hand on Patricia, who decides to give him the Black Fairy Tome page and flee. Jonathan follows Marlya and Veronica out of the church, where he is swiftly killed by Veronica, as she is able to summon her fairy once more. Veronica warns Marlya not to get involved with her for her own safety before leaving. Meanwhile, the Duke of Hybranz Schwarz Diese works plans to make a move against Ray Dawn with Wolfram. Marlya and Free return to HQ, where the rest of Dorothea throw a party for Marlya in celebration of her first successful mission. Veronica hums a song from Suna to herself as she stares at the night sky.
| 6 | "Fellow Traveler"; Transliteration: "Tabi no Michidure" (Japanese: 旅の道連れ) | May 12, 2019 |
After the end of the Unification War, administration of the country was split between the Emperor, the Prime Minister, and five dukes. However, over the years, three of the dukes were killed for treason, with Diese and Ray Dawn being the remaining two Dukes. In the present, Marlya and Free are on patrol in preparation for the tenth anniversary of the end of the Unification War and stop a new artificial Zern I fairy that malfunctions after being sabotaged by an unknown party. Dorothea then receives intelligence on the location of the real Black Fairy Tome so Marlya and Klara are sent to the city of Sinquenje to retrieve it. They follow an agent named Dice who bought the Black Fairy Tome from an auction. While tailing Dice, Klara tells Marlya how she volunteered to join Dorothea after Nein saved her life during the War. They are also followed by Damien. The two are able to apprehend Dice, but he does not have the Black Fairy Tome and refuses to talk. Free and Marlya then encounter Axel, who has recovered from his wound, and he informs them Dice works on the behalf of a man named Gilbert Warlock, a high-ranking Gui Carlin mafia leader. Meanwhile, Sweetie arrives at Warlock's estate. At a formal dinner, Duke Diese smiles at the news of the artificial fairy malfunction.
| 7 | "Stubborn Blacksmith and Biased Rabbit"; Transliteration: "Ganko na Kajiya to Henkutsu Usagi" (Japanese: がんこな鍛冶屋と偏屈ウサギ) | May 19, 2019 |
More Zern I artificial fairies begin to malfunction from sabotage, leading to a division between the rival Ministry of Fairies and Ministry of War over what course of action to take. Sweetie meets with Warlock and asks to see the Black Fairy Tome, but he refuses to show it to her. Dorothea continues to investigate both Warlock and the malfunctioning Zern Is, but cannot uncover new leads. Nein is summoned by Duke Diese, who tries to convince her to ally Dorothea with the Ministry of War against the Ministry of Fairies. Free catches sight of Wolfran in the city and suspects the Arcame family is planning something for the war anniversary, which is three days away. Robert continues to investigate the defective fairies and believes the missing inventor of the previous Psyden VII artificial fairies, Eddy Lloyd, may be involved. Sweetie approaches Dorothea and offers to work with them to investigate Gui Carlin executive Warlock. She, Marlya, and Klara confront Warlock, who admits he possesses the Black Fairy Tome but still refuses to show it. Sweetie offers an exchange, let her see it for Marlya and Klara, who she reveals are Dorothea. In a flashback, a young Sweetie travels to the ruins of the ancient civilization of Tupal.
| 8 | "Pipe Blowing in the Stage Wing"; Transliteration: "Butai Sode no Fuefuki" (Japanese: 舞台そでの笛吹き) | May 26, 2019 |
Working together, Sweetie, Marlya, and Klara use their Fairies to subdue Warlock and his guards as the rest of Dorothea raid the house. Sweetie manages to reach the Black Fairy Tome first, and presumably reads and memorizes it before fleeing. Dorothea recovers the Black Fairy Tome but are unable to apprehend Sweetie. Robert continues his investigation into the malfunctioning artificial fairies. The chief engineer in charge of them, Hanns Efmed, is arrested under suspicion he is the culprit. Evidence of tampering is found on the Zern Is, forcing the government to remove them from the upcoming ceremony. Robert discovers one of Hanns' engineers, Ted Livingston, is in fact Eddy Lloyd's son. He tampered with the Zern Is so they would be replaced with the Psyden VII, which he knows how to override. Robert warns his colleagues Ted plans to use the Psyden VIIs to assassinate Prime Minister Golbarn Helwise. The Psyden VIIs attack Prime Minister Helwise, with Duke Diese leaping in to protect him. Marlya and Free are able to apprehend Ted and stop the assassination attempt. Watching from the crowd, Veronica notices that in contrast to Duke Diese, Ray Dawn stood back and let Prime Minister Helwise be attacked.
| 9 | "Rolling Stones and Seven Knights"; Transliteration: "Korogaru Ishi to Shichinin no Kishi" (Japanese: 転がる石と七人の騎士) | June 2, 2019 |
As a reward for saving Prime Minister Helwise, Duke Diese requests ownership of a Fairy Weapon from the Emperor. Meanwhile, Wolfran informs Ray Dawn about Duke Diese's plan against him. Marlya and Free are instructed to transport one of the seven Fairy Weapons, Fratanil, to Duke Diese. The "Seven Knights," Heroes of Zesskia, each possessed one of seven fairy weapons and killed many fairy soldiers during the war with them. The fairy weapons are natural enemies of fairies and allow the holder to defeat a fairy without a fairy of their own. Four are in lock up, but Ray Dawn, Nein, and Free each possess one of the other three. Fratanil is put on a train under guard by Dorothea. Klara and Serge visit the royal compound and notice it is patrolled by soldiers, not artificial fairies, as Ted's actions jeopardized the reliability of old and new models, causing Serge to comment it would be a bad time for a war to start. The train is ambushed by a mercenary group led Beevee Liscar under Duke Diese's orders, who Wolfram delivers a message to prior to the assault. As one of the Seven Knights, Liscar possesses his own Fairy Weapon. Free attempts to use Fratanil to fight Liscar but is quickly defeated, while Oz is slain by Liscar while protecting Marlya.
| 10 | "Cursed Child"; Transliteration: "Wazawai no Ko" (Japanese: 災いの子) | June 9, 2019 |
Oz's body is taken by the Ministry of Fairies so the fairy organs in his body can be properly disposed of. Marlya blames herself for Oz's death, believing she curses people who are close to her. Free also blames himself for not being strong enough to defeat Liscar. Duke Diese begins practicing using the stolen Fratanil. A spy spots Liscar's mercenaries heading for Rondacia but is killed before he can report it. Marlya, Free, Klara, and Serge are sent to Tudal to inspect Ray Dawn's Fairy Weapon, bringing Marlya face-to-face with the man who destroyed Suna, though she says nothing as she is on duty. Afterwards, Marlya privately visits Don Jingle, the boss of Biaklay mafia family she had previously been a part of. Jingle offers to have Marlya return to the Baiklay mafia, but she remains reluctant. Free then intervenes, telling Jingle he is responsible for Marlya. She reveals she doesn't want anybody else to die for her sake. Free reassures her everybody at Dorothea are her comrades who protect each other and she shouldn't run away from her desire to find Veronica. Marlya rediscovers her determination and decides to stay with Dorothea. Before they can return to Rondacia, they are given a letter by Ray Dawn and are told to deliver it to the Prime Minister. Meanwhile, trucks carrying artificial fairies are spotted crossing the countryside, threatening to spark a war.
| 11 | "Uninvited Music Corps"; Transliteration: "Manekazaru Ongakutai" (Japanese: 招かざる音楽隊) | June 16, 2019 |
In Hybranz, Duke Diese's forces storm the Imperial Embassy, announcing their declaration of independence from Zesskia as artificial fairy reinforcements are shipped in. Since most of the government's artificial fairies are still being inspected for sabotage, Prime Minister Helwise orders Dorothea to join the response force and authorizes the use of the Fairy Weapon Aliadra. Meanwhile, Liscar and his men have already infiltrated Rondacia. Marlya, Free, Klara, and Serge return to the city as the rest of Dorothea leaves with the response force, leaving them as the only Dorothea agents in the city. Free delivers Ray Dawn's letter to Prime Minister Helwise, which reveals the rebellion in Hybranz is a diversion and Duke Diese's true plan is to attack the Emperor directly. Marlya, Free, Klara, and Serge head out to defend the Emperor, with Free bringing his own Fairy Weapon Verosteal. Duke Diese and Wolfran secretly enter the city, with Duke Diese promising to end the government's monopoly on fairies. In Ray Dawn's mansion, his Fairy Weapon has been removed from its case. The Hybranz troops attacking the Rondacia Palace's East and West gates are repelled, but Liscar attacks the Heavenly Gate and breaches it with his Fairy.
| 12 | "Powerless Soldier"; Transliteration: "Muryokuna Heitai" (Japanese: 無力な兵隊) | June 23, 2019 |
Liscar and his troops breach the palace and fight their way through the Zesskian troops. Free confronts Liscar directly, and with assistance from Marlya, Klara, and Serge, he is able to get the upper hand on Liscar and seriously wound him. Rather than continue the battle, Liscar calls for his troops to retreat. Wanting to avenge Oz's death, Marlya chases after them against Free's orders. Meanwhile, Duke Diese tells Wolfran how there are many factions within Zesskia that would be willing to support him if he is able to secure the Emperor as a puppet ruler. He uses a secret passage to infiltrate the palace and reach the Emperor's throne room, only to be confronted by Ray Dawn. Ray Dawn reveals that Wolfran was a double agent working for him the entire time, and he kills Duke Diese for his treason. Liscar is able to escape the palace by breaking through Prime Minister Helwise's blockade. Marlya is finally stopped by Free, who tells her that they have won, despite the death and destruction that was wrought.
Part 2
| 13 | "Rain Sound's Crime and White Snow's Punishment"; Transliteration: "Amaoto no Tsumi to Shirayuki no Batsu" (Japanese: 雨音の罪と白雪の罰) | October 6, 2019 |
In the aftermath of Duke Diese's attempted coup, Ray Dawn reflects on his past. When it was still standing, Suna was considered a "Fairy Village", where all of the residents were capable of seeing Fairy primordials. As a young man, Ray was one of the village's guardians along with his father and his brother Jurgen before leaving to fight in the War of Unification. At the same time, another guardian, Marlya's father, dies luring a dangerous Fairy called the Esteemed One away from the village while Marlya's mother dies giving birth to Marlya. In order to placate the Esteemed One, the village elders decide to begin sacrificing children to it. Remembering how the village previously sacrificed four children, including his sister, Ray's father decides to sacrifice himself to lure the Esteemed One deeper into the forest to prevent the ritual. Jurgen adopts Marlya after returning from the War due to a leg injury. Marlya is treated as the village outcast, with her only friend being Veronica. In contrast to Marlya, Veronica is seen as a blessed child due to the good fortune that seems to surround her. Later, Ray leads an army into Suna. Despite being ordered by the king of Kal-O to seize Suna and its fairies, Ray decides to destroy the village to prevent the power of its fairies from being abused by humans. Ray's troops burn down the village and the forest and massacre the villagers, leaving Marlya and Veronica the only survivors. In the present, Ray and Dorothea are celebrated as heroes. Marlya wonders if taking revenge on Ray is worth it, while Veronica swears vengeance on him.
| 14 | "Wheel-Stopping Castle"; Transliteration: "Haguruma ga Tomaru Shiro" (Japanese: 歯車がとまる城) | October 13, 2019 |
Marlya, Free, Klara, and Serge are assigned to escort Ray back to Tsubal via train, while Veronica quietly follows, hoping for an opportunity to attack. However, an explosion destroys a rail bridge before the train can cross, forcing Ray and Dorothea to take refuge in a nearby abandoned castle. Wolfran and an associate, Michel Connor, secretly meet Ray during the night, where they conclude that the Arcame mafia is behind the assassination attempt as revenge for Ray betraying them. As Arcame stages a frontal attack on the castle with artificial fairies, Veronica sneaks into the castle. She encounters Wolfran, who easily overpowers her fairy with his own just as Marlya and Free arrive. Free engages in battle with Wolfran while Marlya follows Veronica after she leaps into the castle moat. In a flashback, it is revealed that 8 years ago, Veronica was rescued by Damien, who is actually a descendant of Crucia Albastora, the original author of the Black Fairy Tome. She later undergoes Fairy possession by accident when handling one of Damien's Fairy primoridials. Veronica then wakes up, finding out she was rescued by Marlya. Free and Wolfran continue to battle to a stalemate, with Wolfran escaping after asking Free for what purpose he fights. Marlya attempts to convince Veronica to give up on chasing Ray, but Veronica is too obsessed with revenge and takes her leave, with Marlya swearing to find her again.
| 15 | "Weeding of Back Streets"; Transliteration: "Uramachi no Kusahiki" (Japanese: 裏町の草ひき) | October 20, 2019 |
During the Unification War, Ledrad, the nation Free and Wolfran fought for, was forced to surrender after their leader King Olbany committed suicide. After returning from Kal-O, Marlya, Free, Klara, and Serge are assigned to apprehend the remnants of the Arcame group. Free meanwhile remains troubled by the question Wolfran asked him. Thanks to information provided by Axel, Dorothea begins to search for Christoph Rahn, the man who would have been king of Ledrad after Olbany. Christoph is suspected of providing information to Duke Diese about the secret passage under the Emperor's palace, which used to belong to Ledrad. However, their search comes to an end when Axel discovers Christoph dead from an apparent suicide. Free recognizes Christoph's suicide was staged and Axel is arrested as the prime suspect as he was first on the scene, though they're not convinced he killed him. In a flashback, it is revealed Axel has been working with Liscar the entire time. Christoph requested to get into contact with Liscar to hire him but Axel refused, stating Christoph was a liability before murdering him.
| 16 | "Kite Laughing Out Loud"; Transliteration: "Warai Korogeru Tonbi" (Japanese: 笑いころげるトンビ) | October 27, 2019 |
During a routine inspection in the port city of Baleun, authorities discover Black Nine of the Black Fairy Tome, which was to be smuggled out of the country. Dorothea is ordered to head to Baleun to recover Black Nine as well as investigate its origins. Damien also learns of the discovery of Black Nine. Sweetie and Patricia also make their way to Baleun. Veronica and Damien arrive at Baleun first, only to run into Eajey Daven Thor, one of the four top executives of Gui Carlin who possesses the Fairy Weapon Morterant. They are forced to withdraw as Eajey takes Black Nine, and it is revealed that Crucia wrote the Black Fairy Tome based on the notes of Colen Thor, author of the White Fairy Tome and Eajey's ancestor. Dorothea arrives to find the administration building on fire, so Marlya and Free head into investigate. Sweetie approaches Veronica and Damien and proposes they work together to recover Black Nine. Eajey however attacks first, scattering Veronica, Sweetie, and Patricia and taunting Free and Marlya to come try and take Black Nine from him. As Free pursues Eajey, Marlya confronts Damien having noticed that he called out Veronica's name.
| 17 | "Balance on Sand"; Transliteration: "Suna no Ue no Tenbin" (Japanese: 砂の上の天秤) | November 3, 2019 |
Sweetie and Patricia prepare to leave Baleun, and Sweetie tells Patricia how her father used to explore the ruins of Midend, where the Black Fairy Tome was found, and disappeared on one of his expeditions. Despite their best efforts, Dorothea is unable to find Eajey before being forced to lift the blockade on Baleun. Instead, they transport Damien back to HQ for further questioning. Damien is willing to talk, but only to Nein. He reveals his true identity as an Albastora to her, as well as the fact he knows all of the information the Black Fairy Tome contains. Damien warns Nein that his family attempted to destroy the Black Fairy Tome since its contents are too dangerous to be known to the public, and groups more dangerous than Gui Carlin are attempting to recover it. Free meets with Sweetie and asks her to tell him everything she knows about Gui Carlin. With permission from Prime Minister Helwise, Dorothea begins a series of raids to apprehend suspected high ranking Gui Carlin members. To protect Damien from his enemies, Marlya and Free secretly transport him out of Dorothea HQ to move him to a safer location.
| 18 | "Dancing Mouse and Broken Horn"; Transliteration: "Odoru Nezumi to Oreta Tsuno" (Japanese: 踊るネズミと折れた角) | November 10, 2019 |
Thanks to the raids on Gui Carlin, Dorothea is able to recover Black Three and Black Six. Eajey is the sole remaining Gui Carlin executive unaccounted for, and he still possesses Black Nine. Eajey meanwhile has fled to the abandoned castle of Theodula, where he is secretly building his own army of Fairy Soldiers. As Dorothea mobilizes to raid Theodula, Nein meets with Damien. He warns her about the current Minister of Fairies Marco Bellwood and the Fairy worshipping cult he leads, Eins. Sweetie and Patricia also arrive at Theodula, planning to take advantage of Dorothea's raid to steal Black Nine for themselves. Marlya, Klara, and Serge stay behind to hold off Eajey's forces while Free confronts Eajey himself. Free manages to defeat Eajey, resulting in him falling to his death. Veronica finds Eajey's corpse and steals Morterant. Dorothea takes possession of Black Nine, but it is stolen by Wolfran and Michel. Marlya is shocked to see that Michel is using Ozz's Fairy.
| 19 | "Sad Voices and Black Book"; Transliteration: "Kanashī Koe to Kuroi Hon" (Japanese: 悲しい声と黒い本) | November 17, 2019 |
Marlya confronts Michel, who tries to attack her with Ozz's Fairy. However, Ozz's Fairy resists his control and refuses to fight Marlya, giving her the opportunity to retaliate with her own Fairy, which manifests a new power that banishes Ozz's Fairy from Michel's body. With Michel in custody, Dorothea gains enough evidence to suspect that Wolfran and Michel are working on the behalf of the Ministry of Fairies, who only need Black Nine to complete the Black Fairy Tome. Realizing that Marlya may have unprecedented abilities due to being Fairy possessed, Nein orders her and Free to retrieve Damien to find out more about Fairy possession. Damien realizes that Marco plans to use the Black Fairy Tome to revive the Divine Beast, an extremely powerful Fairy that was responsible for the destruction of the ancient civilization of Tupal. He requests a direct meeting with Prime Minister Helwise to warn him. Shocked by this new information, Prime Minister Helwise orders the arrest of Marco and his accomplices. With the Prime Minister's authorization, Dorothea prepares to raid the Ministry of Fairies.
| 20 | "Forest of Beginning"; Transliteration: "Hajimari no Mori" (Japanese: はじまりの森) | November 24, 2019 |
Dorothea raids the Ministry of Fairies, but find out that Marco was one step ahead of them, having already escaped and taken all of the Fairy Weapons with him. Since one of the requirements to revive the Divine Beast is a Fairy-possessed organ, Marlya reveals her Fairy possession to the rest of the Dorothea. Since her status was kept secret from the Ministry of Fairies, they suspect that they will target either Ray Dawn or Veronica. The government then begins a massive manhunt for Marco and his associates. They then discover three locations Marco spent long periods of time at: Branhut, Fuzan, and Isharat. Klara and Serge head to Isharat, which is the hometown of Marco's lieutenant, Griff Mercer. Marlya and Free head to Branhut, which is Wolfran's hometown. They learn from a local about the death of Wolfran's family, as well as him encountering and joining Marco when he made a pilgrimage through the town. Wolfran secretly meets Michel in prison, where he learns about Marlya's Fairy possession and gives Michel a suicide drug. Marlya and Free then head to Fuzan to search for Olek Gunnar. Marlya recognizes the name as one of Suna's guardians and they track him down back to the ruins of Suna. Olek explains he was shot and left for dead by Ray Dawn's troops, but managed to survive. He further explains that the Divine Beast isn't a natural fairy, but a man made one created by Tupal which they lost control of. In addition, he reveals that Veronica would have been the child to be sacrificed to the Esteemed One, not Marlya. He then explains he had led Marco to the forest, where they found and captured the Esteemed One, which is required to revive the Divine Beast. Marlya and Free decide to stop at an abandoned castle to rest, but Wolfran arrives to capture Marlya. Back at the capital, Prime Minister Helwise is assassinated by Griff.
| 21 | "Rusted Warrior and Unopening Door"; Transliteration: "Sabita Tsuwamono to Akanai Tobira" (Japanese: 錆びた強者と開かない扉) | December 1, 2019 |
Wolfran attempts to kidnap Marlya is but is chased away by Free. Upon returning to Rondacia, Marlya offers to use herself as bait to lure out the Eins Order so Dorothea can apprehend them. Free supports Maryla's decision and Nein reluctantly approves it. Ray Dawn then arrives in Rondacia, offering to relinquish his dukedom to succeed Helwise as Prime Minister. Marlya reveals her status as a Suna survivor to Ray Dawn, while Veronica stalks him. Meanwhile, Marco continues to plan his next move, since all three known Fairy possessed are now in Rondacia. The Emperor appoints Ray Dawn as the acting Prime Minister. Wolfran frees Axel from prison and tells him to get into contact with Liscar. Ray Dawn requests Marlya to meet him, where he warns her not to listen to the voices of Fairies, since they are ultimately tools for humans. Marlya counters that Ray Dawn massacred humans at Suna, and he admits he did it to ensure he would be the only Fairy-possessed individual. Free and Marlya continue their search for Veronica and manage to track her down, but Veronica refuses to give up on her chance at revenge despite Marlya's pleas and flees. Meanwhile, Axel meets Liscar at his camps and offers him a "once in a lifetime" job.
| 22 | "Parade of Demise"; Transliteration: "Shūen no Parēdo" (Japanese: 終焉のパレード) | December 8, 2019 |
Dorothea escorts Ray Dawn as he goes to attend Helwise's funeral. However, their convoy is attacked by the Order, who deploy artificial fairies and troops. Free engages Wolfran while Nein battles Liscar. Ray Dawn is badly injured in the ambush, and with the Order attacking all over the city, Marlya and Robert are forced to evacuate Ray Dawn to a remote safehouse. Robert leaves to find help, which is when Veronica arrives. She battles Ray Dawn, who is at a disadvantage due to his injury. However, when she finally corners him, Marlya intervenes, observing that despite his claims, Ray Dawn still regrets the destruction of Suna. She points out that he could have easily had Veronica killed the first time she tried to assassinate him, but he instead spared her life. Ray Dawn admits his feelings of regret and apologizes, even though he expects no forgiveness. Veronica finally realizes killing Ray Dawn will not resolve anything and gives up on her revenge, with Marlya promising they figure out what to do. Griff suddenly attacks and captures Ray Dawn. The Order then extracts Ray Dawn's Fairy organ and begins the ritual to awaken the Divine Beast.
| 23 | "One from an Unending Dream"; Transliteration: "Samenu Yume Yori Dedeshi Mono" (Japanese: 覚めぬ夢より出でしもの) | December 15, 2019 |
Marlya and Veronica recover from Griff's attack, and agree to work together to stop the Divine Beast. Meanwhile, the Divine Beast awakens, killing Marco and his followers as it begins turning everything around it into dust. Nein is able to defeat and kill Liscar while the rest of his troops are mopped up by Dorothea. Free defeats Wolfran but spares his life, telling him that the world will continue to exist despite the Order's attempts to end it. The Divine Beast begins rampaging through Rondacia, destroying everybody in its path as the people try to seek shelter in the palace. Klara, Serge, and Robert encounter a wounded Damien when they learn about the Divine Beast, but they are powerless to stop it. Free encounters Griff, who boasts that he has been chosen by Marco to rebuild the world after the Divine Beast destroys it. Wolfran then arrives and teams up with Free to battle Griff. Marlya and Veronica try to help civilians evacuate when Marlya hears the Divine Beast's voice. Realizing the Divine Beast is being forced against its will to destroy everything, Marlya resolves to free it.
| 24 | "Freed Sky - Joined Hands"; Transliteration: "Hanata Reta Sora Tsunaidate" (Japanese: 放たれた空 つないだ手) | December 22, 2019 |
Marlya and Veronica chase after the Divine Beast. Working together, Free and Wolfran are able to kill Griff but Wolfran is wounded in the fight. As Free goes on ahead to confront the Divine Beast, Wolfran finally comes to terms with the loss of his family. Marlya and Veronica attempt to attack the Divine Beast, but Veronica is impaled and mortally wounded in the attempt. Veronica thanks Maryla for still being her friend after all this time and pushes her out of the way the Divine Beast's attack before being turned to dust. Veronica's Fairy then possesses Marlya and fuses with her own Fairy. Free then arrives and manages to wound the Divine Beast, allowing Marlya to use her new Fairy to enter the Divine Beast and destroy its Fairy Organ from within, defeating it. Three months later, Rondacia has begun reconstruction efforts to repair the damage the Divine Beast caused. Dorothea continues its duties and manages to arrest Axel for escaping prison while Nein jokingly considers becoming the next Prime Minister. Damien joins the Ministry of Fairies while Sweetie and Patricia leave Eastal on a voyage and Wolfran returns to his hometown. Marlya visits Veronica's grave at the ruins of Suna and promises to continue being an ambassador between humans and Fairies. She then leaves with Free, who reminds her that they still have a lot of work to do to realize their dream of seeing a future where Fairies are no longer used as weapons.
