= List of Kuroko's Basketball episodes =

Box art of the first Blu-ray compilation released on July 27, 2012

Kuroko's Basketball is an anime series adapted from the manga series of the same name by Tadatoshi Fujimaki. It is produced by Production I.G and directed by Shunsuke Tada, it began broadcasting on Mainichi Broadcasting System on April 7, 2012, with Tokyo MX, Nippon BS Broadcasting, and Animax beginning broadcast in the weeks following. The final episode of season 1 aired on September 22, 2012, and it was announced in the seasonally published Jump NEXT! winter issue that a second season has been green-lit, and aired on October 5, 2013. The series was also simulcast on Crunchyroll as part of their spring lineup of anime titles. Kuroko's Basketball centres on the "Generation of Miracles", the regulars of the Teikō Middle School basketball team who rose to distinction by demolishing all competition. After graduating from middle school, these five stars went to different high schools with top basketball teams. However, a fact few know is that there was another player of the "Generation of Miracles", the phantom sixth player. This mysterious player is now a freshman at Seirin High, a new school with a powerful, if little-known, team. Now, Tetsuya Kuroko, the phantom sixth member of the "Generation of Miracles", and Taiga Kagami, a naturally talented player who spent most of middle school in America, are aiming to bring Seirin to the top of Japan, taking on Kuroko's old teammates one by one.

The series' first DVD and Blu-ray compilation was released on July 27, 2012 with a new DVD/Blu-ray compilation being released monthly. As of December 2012, seven DVD/Blu-ray compilations have been released.

On October 19, 2020, the SAG-AFTRA listed and approved an English dub for the series under the "Netflix Dubbing Agreement". The first season's English dub debuted on Netflix on January 15, 2021, with its second season on May 15, and its third season on September 18.

== Series overview ==
Season	Episodes	Originally released	
Season	Episodes	First released	Last released
1	25	April 7, 2012	September 22, 2012
2	25	October 6, 2013	March 29, 2014
3	25	January 10, 2015	June 30, 2015

== Episode list ==
=== Season 1 (2012) ===
No. overall	No. in season	Title	Original release date
1	1	"I am Kuroko"; Transliteration: "Kuroko wa Boku desu" (Japanese: 黒子はボクです)	April 7, 2012
2	2	"I am Serious"; Transliteration: "Honki desu" (Japanese: 本気です)	April 14, 2012
3	3	"It's Better If I Can't Win"; Transliteration: "Katenee Gurai ga Chōdo ii" (Japanese: 勝てねェぐらいがちょうどいい)	April 21, 2012
4	4	"Take Care of the Counterattack!"; Transliteration: "Gyakushū Yoroshiku!" (Japanese: 逆襲よろしく！)	April 28, 2012
5	5	"Your Basketball"; Transliteration: "Omae no Basuke" (Japanese: おまえのバスケ)	May 5, 2012
6	6	"Let Me Tell You Two Things"; Transliteration: "Futatsu Itte Oku ze" (Japanese: 2つ言っておくぜ)	May 12, 2012
7	7	"You'll See Something Amazing"; Transliteration: "Sugoi mon Mireru wa yo" (Japanese: すごいもん見れるわよ)	May 19, 2012
8	8	"Now That I Think About It"; Transliteration: "Aratamete Omoimashita" (Japanese: 改めて思いました)	May 26, 2012
9	9	"To Win"; Transliteration: "Katsu tame ni" (Japanese: 勝つために)	June 2, 2012
10	10	"I Can't Have That"; Transliteration: "Komari masu" (Japanese: 困ります)	June 9, 2012
11	11	"It's Not Like That"; Transliteration: "Sonna mon ja nee daro" (Japanese: そんなもんじゃねえだろ)	June 16, 2012
12	12	"What Is "Victory""; Transliteration: ""Shōri" tte nan desu ka" (Japanese: 『勝利』ってなんですか)	June 23, 2012
13	13	"I Believed in You"; Transliteration: "Shinjitemashita" (Japanese: 信じてました)	June 30, 2012
14	14	"You Look Just Like Him"; Transliteration: "Sokkuri da ne" (Japanese: そっくりだね)	July 7, 2012
15	15	"Don't Make Me Laugh"; Transliteration: "Warawasennayo" (Japanese: 笑わせんなよ)	July 14, 2012
16	16	"Let's Go"; Transliteration: "Yarō ka" (Japanese: やろーか)	July 21, 2012
17	17	"You're All Ridiculous"; Transliteration: "Fuzaketa Yatsu Bakkari da" (Japanese: ふざけた奴ばっかりだ)	July 28, 2012
18	18	"No!!"; Transliteration: "Iya da!!" (Japanese: 嫌だ!!)	August 4, 2012
19	19	"On to a New Challenge"; Transliteration: "Atarashii Chōsen e" (Japanese: 新しい挑戦へ)	August 11, 2012
20	20	"I Don't Want To Be"; Transliteration: "Naritai ja nē yo" (Japanese: なりたいじゃねーよ)	August 18, 2012
21	21	"Let's Get Started"; Transliteration: "Hajimeru wa yo" (Japanese: 始めるわよ)	August 25, 2012
22	22	"I'll Win Even If It Kills Me"; Transliteration: "Shindemo Katsu ssu kedo" (Japanese: 死んでも勝つっスけど)	September 1, 2012
23	23	"Not An Adult!"; Transliteration: "Otona ja nē yo!" (Japanese: 大人じゃねーよ!)	September 8, 2012
24	24	"Don't Get The Wrong Idea"; Transliteration: "Kanchigai shitenja nē yo" (Japanese: カン違いしてんじゃねーよ)	September 15, 2012
25	25	"Our Basketball"; Transliteration: "Ore to Omae no Basuke" (Japanese: オレとおまえのバスケ)	September 23, 2012

=== Season 2 (2013–14) ===
No. overall	No. in season	Title	Original release date
26	1	"I've Never Thought We'd Meet Here"; Transliteration: "Konna Tokorode Au to wa na" (Japanese: こんな所で会うとはな)	October 6, 2013
27	2	"At The Winter Cup"; Transliteration: "Uintā Kappu de" (Japanese: ウインターカップで)	October 13, 2013
28	3	"Start!!!"; Transliteration: "Shidō!!!" (Japanese: 始動！！！)	October 20, 2013
29	4	"There's Only One Answer"; Transliteration: "Kotae wa Hitotsu ni Kimatte iru" (Japanese: 答えは一つに決まっている)	October 27, 2013
30	5	"I've Been Waiting For This"; Transliteration: "Matteta ze" (Japanese: 待ってたぜ)	November 3, 2013
31	6	"I Surpassed You Long Ago"; Transliteration: "Tō no Mukashi ni Koeteiru" (Japanese: とうの昔に超えている)	November 10, 2013
32	7	"Give Up"; Transliteration: "Akiramero" (Japanese: あきらめろ)	November 17, 2013
33	8	"We're the Seirin High School Basketball Team!"; Transliteration: "Seirin Koukou Basuke-bu da!" (Japanese: 誠凜高校バスケ部だ!)	November 24, 2013
34	9	"I'll Defeat You!!"; Transliteration: "Kanarazu Taosu!" (Japanese: 必ず倒す!)	December 1, 2013
35	10	"It's Trust"; Transliteration: "Shinrai da" (Japanese: 信頼だ)	December 8, 2013
36	11	"Don't be Ridiculous"; Transliteration: "Fuzakeruna" (Japanese: ふざけるな)	December 15, 2013
37	12	"Thanks"; Transliteration: "Yoroshuu Tanomu wa" (Japanese: よろしゅうたのむわ)	December 22, 2013
38	13	"Definitely This Time"; Transliteration: "Kondo wa Mou Zettai ni" (Japanese: 今度はもう絶対に)	January 5, 2014
39	14	"Useless Effort"; Transliteration: "Mudana Doryokuda" (Japanese: ムダな努力だ)	January 12, 2014
40	15	"I Think He's Extremely Happy"; Transliteration: "Ureshikute Shoganai to Omoimasu" (Japanese: 嬉しくてしょうがないと思います)	January 19, 2014
41	16	"We Win Now!"; Transliteration: "Ima Katsun'nda!" (Japanese: 今勝つんだ！)	January 26, 2014
42	17	"I Believe in Him"; Transliteration: "Shinjitemasukara" (Japanese: 信じてますから)	February 2, 2014
43	18	"Like I'd Lose"; Transliteration: "Makeru ka yo" (Japanese: 負けるかよ)	February 9, 2014
44	19	"Tell Me"; Transliteration: "Oshietekudasai" (Japanese: 教えてください)	February 16, 2014
45	20	"Of Course It's Not Easy"; Transliteration: "Karuimono na Hazunai Darō" (Japanese: 軽いものなはずないだろう)	February 23, 2014
46	21	"First Score!!"; Transliteration: "Hatsutokuten!!" (Japanese: 初得点！！)	March 2, 2014
47	22	"No Question"; Transliteration: "Kimatterā" (Japanese: 決まってらぁ)	March 9, 2014
48	23	"I Don't Want to Lose!"; Transliteration: "Maketakunai!" (Japanese: 負けたくない！)	March 16, 2014
49	24	"Enough"; Transliteration: "Mō ī ya" (Japanese: もういいや)	March 23, 2014
50	25	"Win!"; Transliteration: "Katsu!" (Japanese: 勝つ!)	March 30, 2014

=== Season 3 (2015) ===
No. overall	No. in season	Title	Original release date
51	1	"I'm Just Going at Full Strength"; Transliteration: "Zenryoku de Yatteru dake Nande" (Japanese: 全カでやってるだけなんで)	January 10, 2015
52	2	"This Is Mine"; Transliteration: "Ore no Mon da" (Japanese: オレのもんだ)	January 17, 2015
53	3	"Don't You Get In My Way"; Transliteration: "Jama Sunja Nee yo" (Japanese: ジャマすんじゃねーよ)	January 24, 2015
54	4	"I'll Take This For Now"; Transliteration: "Morattokuwa" (Japanese: もらっとくわ)	January 31, 2015
55	5	"I Know None of That"; Transliteration: "Watashi wa Sore o Mattaku Shirimasen" (Japanese: 私はそれを全く知りません)	February 7, 2015
56	6	"I Will Offer Them"; Transliteration: "Watashi wa Sorera o Teikyō shimasu" (Japanese: 私はそれらを提供します)	February 14, 2015
57	7	"It Makes Me Laugh"; Transliteration: "Sore wa Watashi ni Warai o Tsukurimasu" (Japanese: それは私に笑いを作ります)	February 21, 2015
58	8	"True Light"; Transliteration: "Shin no Hikari" (Japanese: 真の光)	February 28, 2015
59	9	"Don't Belittle Us!!"; Transliteration: "Namen janee" (Japanese: ナメんじゃねぇ!!)	March 7, 2015
60	10	"In Order to Win"; Transliteration: "Katsu tame ni" (Japanese: 勝つために)	March 14, 2015
61	11	"This Time, For Sure"; Transliteration: "Kondokoso" (Japanese: 今度こそ)	March 21, 2015
62	12	"He is the Best Player"; Transliteration: "Saikō no Senshu desu" (Japanese: 最高の選手です)	March 28, 2015
63	13	"A Day with Blue Skies"; Transliteration: "Aoi Sora no Hi" (Japanese: 青い空の日)	April 4, 2015
64	14	"....Sorry"; Transliteration: "...Warii" (Japanese: 。。。ワリィ)	April 11, 2015
65	15	"We No Longer"; Transliteration: "Bokura wa Mou" (Japanese: 僕らはもう)	April 18, 2015
66	16	"What is Victory?"; Transliteration: "Shōri tte Nan desu ka?" (Japanese: 勝利ってなんですか？)	April 25, 2015
67	17	"Final Tip-off!!"; Transliteration: "Fainaru Tippu-ofu!!" (Japanese: 決勝戦試合開始！！(ファイナル ティップ オフ))	May 2, 2015
68	18	"Isn't it the Best?"; Transliteration: "Saikō ja ne no?" (Japanese: 最高じゃねーの？)	May 9, 2015
69	19	"A Miracle will not Hpapen"; Transliteration: "Kiseki wa Okinai" (Japanese: 奇跡は起きない)	May 16, 2015
70	20	"Weight of Resolve"; Transliteration: "Kakugo no Omosa" (Japanese: 覚悟の重さ)	May 23, 2015
71	21	"In My Own Way, I'm Desperate"; Transliteration: "Kore demo Hisshida yo" (Japanese: これでも必死だよ)	May 30, 2015
72	22	"A Warning"; Transliteration: "Chūkoku da" (Japanese: 忠告だ)	June 6, 2015
73	23	"Why Don't We Give Up?"; Transliteration: "Akiramemasen ka" (Japanese: 諦めませんか)	June 13, 2015
74	24	"So It Was You"; Transliteration: "Omaedattan janē ka" (Japanese: お前だったんじゃねーか)	June 20, 2015
75	25	"Many Times Over"; Transliteration: "Nandodemo" (Japanese: 何度でも)	June 30, 2015
75.5	25.5	"The Greatest Present"; Transliteration: "Saikō no Puresento desu" (Japanese: 最高のプレセントです)	December 24, 2015

== OVAs ==
No.	Title	Original release date
22.5	"Kuroko's Basketball: Tip Off"; Transliteration: "Kuroko no Basuke: Tip Off" (Japanese: 黒子のバスケ 第22.5Q 「Tip off」)	February 22, 2013
An unaired, full-length, bonus episode of the series numbered Episode 22.5, bundled with BD/DVD volume 8. The episode covers Kise and his entry to the first team of Teiko Middle School, which features the Generation of Miracles as all members are revealed. He teams up with Kuroko and some second team members in an exhibition game. Kise realizes Kuroko's true abilities as they beat their opponents 83–81. After the game, Kise begins to respect Kuroko (calling him Kurokocchi for the first time) and further develops a love for basketball.
N–A	"Kuroko's Basketball: Let's Chat!"; Transliteration: "Kuroko no Basuke: Oshaberi Shiyokka" (Japanese: 黒子のバスケ お喋りしよっか)	December 21, 2012
Comedic recap of the first season of Kuroko's Basketball, included on the official DVD fandisc.
N–A	"Kuroko's Basketball: NG-shuu"; Transliteration: "Kuroko no Basuke: NG-shuu" (Japanese: 黒子のバスケNG集)	July 27, 2012 to Mar 22, 2013
"Bloopers" from the first season of Kuroko's Basketball. There are 9 episodes in total, each one approximately 2 minutes in length each.
