= List of Yume Tsukai episodes =

Yume Tsukai is an anime television series produced by Pony Canyon, animated by Madhouse, and based on the manga series by Riichi Ueshiba. Consisting of 12 episodes, it is directed by Kazuo Yamazaki with Kenichi Ishikura as assistant director, written by Yasuko Kobayashi, and music composed by Tamiya Terashima. Shuichi Shimamura was the character designer, and Kiyotaka Nakahara was the guest character designer. The series aired on Television Kanagawa from April 9 to June 25, 2006. (Note: Yume Tsukai aired on Television Kanagawa on Saturday 26:30, effectively Sunday at 2:30 a.m. JST.) It was followed by airings on TV Saitama, (Note: Aired on TV Saitama on Tuesday 26:00, effectively Wednesday at 2:00 a.m. JST.) and TV Asahi starting April 12, 2006; (Note: Aired on TV Asahi on Tuesday 26:51, effectively Wednesday at 2:51 a.m. JST.) Chiba TV on April 13; (Note: Aired on Chiba TV on Wednesday 26:00, effectively Thursday at 2:00 a.m. JST.) and Tokyo MX on April 14. (Note: Aired on Tokyo MX on Thursday 25:30, effectively Friday at 1:30 a.m. JST.) The series was rerun on AT-X in 2008 and 2009.

The series' opening theme is "Yume Meikyuu ~Hikari to Yami no Dance~" (夢迷宮～光と闇のダンス～), performed by Yoko with lyrics written by Yuriko Mori, and composition and arrangements by Tamiya Terashima. The single was released on April 26, 2006, with catalog code (KDCM-0064). It peak ranked 108th on Oricon singles charts.

The series' ending theme is "Kodō" (鼓動), performed by Ayako Kawasumi and Kei Shindō as their anime characters, with lyrics and composition by Ichiko, and arrangements by Mikio Sakai. The single was released on May 10, 2006, with catalog code (KDCM-0065). It peak ranked 145th on Oricon singles charts.

== Episodes ==
No.	Title	Original release date
1	"The Beginning of The Dream: The Classroom of Rain"; Transliteration: "Yume no hajimari: Ame no kyōshitsu" (Japanese: 夢の始まり：雨の教室)	April 9, 2006
2	"Kind Footsteps"; Transliteration: "Shinsetsu na ashiato" (Japanese: 親切な足跡)	April 16, 2006
3	"The Growing Feelings of Love"; Transliteration: "Fukuramu koigokoro" (Japanese: ふくらむ恋心)	April 23, 2006
4	"Doyousei Appears"; Transliteration: "Doyōsei arawaru" (Japanese: 土曜星あらわる)	April 30, 2006
5	"Family Affairs"; Transliteration: "Kazoku moyō" (Japanese: 家族模様)	May 7, 2006
6	"A Holiday from Dreams"; Transliteration: "Yume no Kyūjitsu" (Japanese: 夢の休日)	May 14, 2006
7	"A Secret Flower Garden"; Transliteration: "Himitsu no Hanazono" (Japanese: 秘密の花園)	May 21, 2006
8	"May These Memories Disappear"; Transliteration: "Omoide wa kiete" (Japanese: 思い出は消えて)	May 28, 2006
9	"A Boy Hiding Within the Darkness"; Transliteration: "Yami ni sumu shōnen" (Japanese: 闇に棲む少年)	June 4, 2006
10	"Misako Goes to Work"; Transliteration: "Misako, shukkinsuru" (Japanese: 美佐子、出勤する)	June 11, 2006
11	"A Nightmare from the Past"; Transliteration: "Kako kara kita akumu" (Japanese: 過去から来た悪夢)	June 18, 2006
12	"The End of a Dream: Touko's Choice"; Transliteration: "Yumejimai: Tōko no sentaku" (Japanese: 夢仕舞い・塔子の選択)	June 25, 2006
