= Yūko Kaida =

Japanese actress and voice actress (born 1980)

- 甲斐田 裕子
- Born: January 14, 1980 (age 46); Kawasaki, Kanagawa Prefecture, Japan
- Other names: Kaita-chin; Yuhko Kaida
- Occupations: Actress; voice actress
- Years active: 2000–present
- Agent: Ken Production
- Spouse: Tomoyuki Hirasawa
- Children: 1
- Website: yuhko-kaida.com

Yūko Kaida (甲斐田 裕子, Kaida Yūko; born January 14, 1980) is a Japanese actress and voice actress who is affiliated with Ken Production. Her most known roles include Shimei Ryomou in Ikki Tousen, Tsukuyo in Gintama, Chasca in Genshin Impact, Kyō Takamimori in Potemayo, Amane Ootori in Strawberry Panic!, Minako Tsukiyama in Maria-sama ga Miteru, Maeda Matsu in Sengoku Basara, and Isabella in The Promised Neverland.

== Filmography ==
=== Television animation ===
Year	Title	Character	Notes	Refs
2001	Geneshaft	Sofia Galgalim		
2001	Strawberry Eggs	Teacher		
2001	PaRappa the Rapper	Receptionist		
2001	Vandread: The Second Stage	Roban		
2002	The Twelve Kingdoms	School Girl 3, Student Girl 2, Secretary 1	Episodes 1, 4, 9	
2002	Ai Yori Aoshi	Miyuki		
2002	Shrine of the Morning Mist	Girl B	Episode 16	
2002	Petite Princess Yucie	Kate	Episode 4	
2002	Ghost in the Shell: Stand Alone Complex	Niimi's Secretary	Episodes 21–22	
2002	Getbackers	High Schoolgirl	Episode 27	
2002, 2005	Hamtaro	Harmony		
2003	Transformers: Armada	Teacher		
2003	Gunparade March	Librarian		
2003	Stellvia	Girl A	Episode 1	
2003	Astro Boy	Tamami		
2003	Texhnolyze	Yoko		
2003	Godannar	Shadow		
2003	Saiyuki Reload	Shunto	Episode 11	
2003	Fullmetal Alchemist	Leo/Rick's Mother	Episode 24	
2003, 2007–2008, 2010, 2022	Ikki Tousen	Shimei Ryomou	Seasons 1, 2 (Dragon Destiny), 3 (Great Guardians), 4 (Xtreme Xecutor) and 5 (Shin Ikki Tousen)	
2004	Daphne in the Brilliant Blue	Yuu Paku		
2004	Maria Watches Over Us	Minako Tsukiyama	Seasons 1 and 2 (Printemps)	
2004	Kurau: Phantom Memory	Ayaka		
2004	Tactics	Yumeyakko		
2004	Kujibiki Unbalance	Izumi Tachibana		
2005	Starship Operators	Imari Kamiya		
2005	Jinki:Extend	Aunt Cafeteria		
2005	Best Student Council	Yuuko Kimizuka	Episode 9	
2005	Tsubasa: Reservoir Chronicle	Souma		
2005	Trinity Blood	Sister Paula		
2005	Onegai My Melody	Kanade Yumeno		
2005	Kamichu!	Student Council Vice President		
2005	Kotencotenco	Thoth		
2005	Blood+	Julia Silverstein		
2006	Digimon Data Squad	Hayase's Wife		
2006	Strawberry Panic!	Amane Ootori		
2006	Glass Fleet	Michel Vaurban de Cabelle		
2006	Hime-sama Goyōjin	Miss Yoko		
2006	Ramen Fighter Miki	Hell's Bunny		
2006	Nighthead Genesis	Mayumi	Episode 13	
2006	D.Gray-man	Hevlaska		
2006	009-1	Billy	Episode 7	
2006	Hell Girl: Two Mirrors	Utae Negoro	Episode 10	
2007	Tokyo Majin	Mamiko Sakuya		
2007	Engage Planet Kiss Dum	Itsuki Sasara		
2007	Princess Resurrection	Liza Wildman		
2007	Emma: A Victorian Romance	Nanette	Season 2	
2007	Potemayo	Kyo Takamimori		
2007	Rental Magica	Daphne		
2007	Hero Tales	Rinmei		
2008	Hatenko Yugi	Village Chief's Son		
2008	Kamen no Maid Guy	Saki Tabaruzaka		
2008	Blue Dragon: Trials of the Seven Shadows	Dannel		
2008	Our Home's Fox Deity	Kotoji no Nushi		
2008	Kaiba	Parm		
2008	Golgo 13	Jean Barbara		
2008	Toradora!	Sumire Kanō		
2008	Hyakko	Ushio Makunouchi		
2008	Tytania	Sonia		
2008, 2010	Sekirei	Hikari	Seasons 1 and 2	
2008, 2010, 2018	A Certain Magical Index	Aiho Yomikawa	Seasons 1-3	
2009	Gintama	Tsukuyo		
2009	Kurokami: The Animation	Mikami Houjou		
2009	Birdy the Mighty: Decode	Moss	Season 2	
2009	Asura Cryin'	Toru Kitsutaka	Seasons 1 and 2	
2009	Queen's Blade	Listy	The Exiled Virgin and The Evil Eye	
2009	Gokujō!! Mecha Mote Iinchō	Rika Sakashita		
2009	Hanasakeru Seishōnen	Brigitte		
2009	Guin Saga	Rigea		
2009	Eden of the East	Misae		
2009	Taisho Baseball Girls	Tomoe Tsukubae		
2009	Tokyo Magnitude 8.0	Mari Kusakabe		
2009–2010	Sengoku Basara: Samurai Kings	Matsu	Seasons 1 and 2	
2009, 2011	Maria Holic	Ryuuken Ishima	Seasons 1 and 2 (Alive)	
2009, 2012, 2014	Saki	Jun Inoue	Seasons 1 (Saki), 2 (Episode of Side A) and 3 (The Nationals)	
2009, 2013, 2020	A Certain Scientific Railgun	Aiho Yomikawa		
2010	Dance in the Vampire Bund	Vera		
2010	The Tatami Galaxy	Hanuki-san		
2010	Okami-san & Her Seven Companions	Momoko Kibitsu		
2011	Bleach	Ikumi Unagiya		
2011	Gosick	Secretary	Episodes 9–10	
2011	Freezing	Elizabeth Mably		
2011	Tiger & Bunny	Agnes Joubert		
2011	Astarotte's Toy	Ursula Sumarlidi		
2011	Blue Exorcist	Caspar		
2011	Manyo Hiken-chi	Oiso		
2011	Chihayafuru	Yumi Yamamoto		
2011	Persona 4: The Animation	Mayumi Yamano		
2011	Shakugan no Shana	Shaheru	Season 3	
2011, 2013	Yondemasu yo, Azazel-san.	Uriel, Yumi	Seasons 1 and 2 (You're Being. Summoned, Azazel)	
2012	Bodacious Space Pirates	Ririka Kato		
2012	Queen's Blade: Rebellion	Risty		
2012	Arashi no Yoru ni: Himitsu no Tomodachi	Lolo		
2012	La storia della Arcana Famiglia	Federica		
2012	Code:Breaker	Kanda		
2013	Tokyo Ravens	Hishamaru		
2014	Black Bullet	Sumire Muroto		
2014	Black Butler: Book of Circus	Beast		
2014	Broken Blade	Lee		
2014	Mekakucity Actors	Tsubomi Kido		
2014	Date A Live	Jessica Bailey	Season 2	
2014	Sengoku Basara: End of Judgement	Matsu		
2015	JoJo's Bizarre Adventure: Stardust Crusaders	Malèna	Episodes 32–33	
2015	Subete ga F ni Naru	Miki Magata		
2015	The Asterisk War	Kyōko Yatsuzaki		
2015–2016	Snow White with the Red Hair	Garack Gazelt	Seasons 1 and 2	
2017	Kabukibu!	Kaoru Asagi		
2017	Kado: The Right Answer	Sophie Fukami		
2017	UQ Holder!	Ialda Baoth / Mage of the Beginning	Episode 11	
2018	Dances with the Dragons	Nidvolk		
2018	Hugtto! PreCure	Gelos		
2018	Aikatsu Friends!	Reiko Minato		
2018	Senran Kagura: Shinovi Master	Naraku		
2018	Darling in the Franxx	Karina Milsa		
2019	Dororo	Jorogumo, Ohagi		
2019	The Promised Neverland	Isabella		
2019	One Piece	Belo Betty		
2019	A Certain Scientific Accelerator	Aiho Yomikawa		
2019	YU-NO: A Girl Who Chants Love at the Bound of this World	Grantia		
2019	Special 7: Special Crime Investigation Unit	Akane "Samurai" Shikisai		
2019	Stars Align	Sakura Muroi		
2018–2021	True Cooking Master Boy	Shan	Seasons 1 and 2	
2020	The God of High School	Ma Mi-Seon		
2020	Food Wars!: Shokugeki no Soma	Tamako Yukihira	Season 5	
2020	Ikebukuro West Gate Park	Makoto's mother		
2021	Log Horizon: Destruction of the Round Table	Sarariya		
2021	Farewell, My Dear Cramer	Naoko Nōmi		
2021	The Seven Deadly Sins: Dragon's Judgement	Gelda		
2022	Requiem of the Rose King	Jane Shore		
2022	The Executioner and Her Way of Life	Flare		
2022	Birdie Wing: Golf Girls' Story	Seira Amawashi		
2022	Spy × Family	Sylvia Sherwood		
2022	The Devil Is a Part-Timer!!	Amane Ōguro		
2022	Tatami Time Machine Blues	Hanuki-san		
2022	Chainsaw Man	Fox Devil		
2023	Campfire Cooking in Another World with My Absurd Skill	Kishar		
2023	Hell's Paradise: Jigokuraku	The Tensen's female voices		
2023	Am I Actually the Strongest?	Oratoria Belgam		
2023	Dog Signal	Ritsuka Izumi		
2023	The Apothecary Diaries	Ah-Duo		
2024	Jellyfish Can't Swim in the Night	Yukine		
2024	Tonari no Yōkai-san	Hayachiyo		
2025	Sakamoto Days	Dump		
2025	Miru: Paths to My Future	Dr. Aira		
2025	Teogonia	Zeiena		
2025	Umamusume: Cinderella Gray	Toni Bianca		
2026	Rooster Fighter	Kugone		
2026	The Klutzy Class Monitor and the Girl with the Short Skirt	Nadeshiko Yamato		
2026	I Made Friends with the Second Prettiest Girl in My Class	Masaki Maehara		

=== Tokusatsu ===
Year	Title	Character	Refs
2022	Ultraman Decker	Alien Metron Nigel	
2023	Kamen Rider Gotchard	Xeggdrasil	

=== Original video animation (OVA) ===
Year	Title	Character	Refs
2004	Gunbuster 2: Diebuster	Ruu Soon	
2005–2006	Fafner in the Azure: Right of Left	Yumi Ikoma	
2006	Demon Prince Enma	Enma (child)	
2007	Shin Kyuseishu Densetsu Hokuto no Ken: Yuria-den	Toh	
2008	Master of Martial Hearts	Rei Kakizaki	
2010	Mobile Suit Gundam Unicorn	Marida Cruz	
2016	The Kubikiri Cycle	Jun Aikawa	

=== Original net animation (ONA) ===
Year	Title	Character	Refs
2018–2019	Hero Mask	Sarah Sinclair	
2021	Eden	Geneve	
2021	Resident Evil: Infinite Darkness	Claire Redfield	
2021	The Heike Story	Hōjō Masako	
2022	Kakegurui Twin	Sachiko Juraku	
2022	JoJo's Bizarre Adventure: Stone Ocean	Miuccia Miuller	
2022	Exception	Nina	
2024	Tokyo Override	Ieuji	
2026	Love Through a Prism	Take Ichijoin	

=== Film ===
Year	Title	Character	Refs
2003	Nasu: Summer in Andalusia	Woman A	
2004	Naruto the Movie: Legend of the Stone of Gelel	Yukie Fujikaze	
2008	Resident Evil: Degeneration	Claire Redfield	
2009	Oblivion Island: Haruka and the Magic Mirror	Vikki	
2010	Wonderful World	Shaki Mikami	
2011	Alice in the Country of Hearts: Wonderful Wonder World	Vivaldi	
2012	Blood-C: The Last Dark	Haruno Yanagi	
2012	Code Geass: Akito the Exiled	Sophie Randle	
2013	Gekijkoban Gintama Kanketsu-hen: Yorozuya yo Eien Nare	Tsukuyo	
2014	When Marnie Was There	Marnie's mother	
2015	Digimon Adventure tri.	Maki Himekawa	
2017	The Night Is Short, Walk on Girl	Hanuki-san	
2021	Gintama: The Very Final	Tsukuyo	
2024	Mononoke the Movie: Phantom in the Rain	Awashima	
2026	Paris ni Saku Étoile	Fujiko's mother	

=== Video games ===
Year	Title	Character	Refs
2003	Juniko Kuki – Guren no Hyou Kyoujin no Michi	Classmate	
2005	Radiata Stories	Frau	
2005	Rumble Roses	Dixie Clemets / Sgt. Clemets	
2005	Sengoku Basara	Matsu	
2006	Suikoden V	Jean	
2006	Blood+: One Night Kiss	Julia	
2006	Blood+: Shoyoku no Battle Rondo	Julia	
2006	Sengoku Basara 2	Matsu	
2006	Carnage Heart Portable	Ellen Deminkofu	
2006	Strawberry Panic!	Amane Otori	
2006	EVE～new generation～	Kanemoto	
2006	Armored Core 4	Bromide Aurieru	
2007	Heart no Kuni no Alice ~Wonderful Wonder World~	Vivaldi	
2007	Clover no Kuni no Alice ~Wonderful Wonder World~	Vivaldi	
2007	Ikkitousen Shining Dragon	Shimei Ryomou	
2007	Phantasy Star Universe	Lia Martinez	
2007	Sengoku Basara 2 Heroes	Matsu	
2007	Everybody's Golf 2	Brenda	
2007	Final Fantasy IV	Rosa, Barbariccia	
2007	Ace Combat 6: Fires of Liberation	Ludmila Tolstaya	
2008	God of War	Persephone	
2008	Asaki, Yumemishi	Mizuki, Senhou	
2008	Mario Kart Wii	Female Miis	
2008	Soulcalibur IV	Hildegard von Krone	
2008	Phantasy Star Portable	Lia Martinez	
2008	Trauma Center: Under the Knife 2	Reina Mayuzumi	
2008	Ikkutousen: Eloquent Fist	Shimei Ryomou	
2009	Sengoku Basara Battle Heroes	Matsu	
2009	Toradora! Portable	Sumire Kan	
2009	Gears of War 2	Maria Santiago	
2009	Taishou Yakyuu Musume. ~Otome-tachi no Seishun Nikki~	Tomomi Tsukie	
2009	Sekirei: Mirai Kara no Okurimono	Hikaru	
2009	Joker no Kuni no Alice ~Wonderful Wonder World~	Vivaldi	
2009	Phantasy Star Portable 2	Lia Martinez	
2009	Queen's Blade Spiral Chaos	Turistico	
2010	Abyss of the Sacrifice	Orange	
2010	Heavy Rain	Madison Paige	
2010	Minna Tennis Portable	Rachel	
2010	Saki Portable	Jun Inoue	
2010	Ikkitousen Xross Impact	Shimei Ryomou	
2010	Sengoku Basara 3	Matsu	
2010	Fallout: New Vegas	Veronica Sant'Angelo	
2010	The 3rd Birthday	Gabrielle Monsigny	
2011	Mobile Suit Gundam 00 ~Memories of war~		
2011	Sengoku Basara Chronicles Heroes	Matsu	
2011	Deus Ex: Human Revolution	Fedorova	
2011	To Aru Kagaku no Railgun	Aiho Yomikawa	
2011	Call of Duty:Modern Warfare 3	A-10 Pilot	
2012	Rhythm Thief & the Emperor's Treasure	Elisabeth	
2012	Soulcalibur V	Hildegard von Krone	
2012	Dragon Age II	Sunnyall	
2012	Bravely Default: Flying Fairy	Einheria Venus	
2012	Assassin's Creed III: Liberation	Aveline de Grandpré	
2012	PlayStation All-Stars Battle Royale	Nariko	
2013	Tomb Raider	Lara Croft	
2013	Killer is Dead	Vivian Squall	
2013	Conception II: Shichisei no Michibiki to Mazuru no Akumu	Ruby	
2013	Hanasaku Manimani	Seikiku	
2014	Granblue Fantasy	Freesia Von Bismark	
2014	Black Bullet	Sumire Muroto	
2014	Onechanbara Z2: Chaos	Aya	
2014	Mekakucity Actors	Kido Tsubomi	
2015	Bravely Second	Einheria Venus	
2015	Resident Evil: Revelations 2	Claire Redfield	
2015	Batman: Arkham Knight	Poison Ivy	
2015	Rise of the Tomb Raider	Lara Croft	
2015	Fallout 4	Dr. Madison Li	
2016	Persona 5	Sae Niijima	
2017	Fire Emblem Echoes: Shadows of Valentia	Mathilda	
2017	City Shrouded in Shadow	Risa Kashiwagi	
2018	Octopath Traveler	H'aanit	
2018	Shadow of the Tomb Raider	Lara Croft	
2018	SNK Heroines: Tag Team Frenzy	Skullomania	
2018	Onmyoji	Enenra	
2018	Onmyoji Arena	Enenra	
2018	Dissidia Final Fantasy Opera Omnia	Rosa	
2018	Judgment	Saori Shirosaki	
2019	Resident Evil 2	Claire Redfield	
2019	Astral Chain	Jena Anderson	
2019	AI: The Somnium Files	Boss	
2019	Soulcalibur VI	Hildegard von Krone	
2020	Kandagawa Jet Girls	Naraku Mamiya	
2020	Girls' Frontline	DP-12 & AK-15	
2020	Azur Lane	KMS Mainz	
2020	Arknights	Leizi	
2020	Persona 5 Scramble: The Phantom Strikers	Sae Niijima	
2021	Lost Judgment	Saori Shirosaki	
2022	The King of Fighters XV	Dolores	
2023	Sword Art Online: Last Recollection	Dee Eye Ell	
2023	Path to Nowhere	Raven	
2023	The Legend of Zelda: Tears of the Kingdom	Queen Sonia	
2024	Genshin Impact	Chasca	
2024	Princess Peach: Showtime!	Grape	
2025	Punishing: Gray Raven	Veronica	
2025	Identity V	Melly Plinius	
2026	Zenless Zone Zero	Sigrid	

=== Dubbing ===
==== Film ====
Film year	Title	Character	Original actor	Refs
1942	Casablanca (2013 BS10 Star Channel edition)	Ilsa Lund	Ingrid Bergman	
1952	High Noon (2021 BS10 Star Channel edition)	Amy Fowler Kane	Grace Kelly	
1980	Somewhere in Time (2021 BS Tokyo edition)	Elise McKenna	Jane Seymour	
1986	Crocodile Dundee (Netflix edition)	Sue Charlton	Linda Kozlowski	
1986	Martial Arts of Shaolin	Si-ma Yan	Huang Qiuyan	
1996	Project ALF	Major Dr. Melissa Hill	Jensen Daggett	
2000	Amores perros	Susana	Vanessa Bauche	
2001	The Fast and the Furious	Letty Ortiz	Michelle Rodriguez	
2001	The Princess Diaries	Mia Thermopolis	Anne Hathaway	
2002	Antwone Fisher	Cheryl Smolley	Joy Bryant	
2002	Drumline	Laila	Zoe Saldaña	
2002	Phone Booth	Pamela McFadden	Katie Holmes	
2002	You Stupid Man	Chloe	Denise Richards	
2003	Good Bye, Lenin!	Lara	Chulpan Khamatova	
2004	Anonymous Rex	Louise	Lori Alter	
2004	Wicker Park	Lisa Parish	Diane Kruger	
2004	The Princess Diaries 2: Royal Engagement	Mia Thermopolis	Anne Hathaway	
2005	Brokeback Mountain	Lureen Newsome Twist	Anne Hathaway	
2005	Constantine	Angela Dodson	Rachel Weisz	
2005	The Island	Jordan Two Delta/Sarah Jordan	Scarlett Johansson	
2005	The Descent	Holly	Nora-Jane Noone	
2005	The Hitchhiker's Guide to the Galaxy	Trillian	Zooey Deschanel	
2006	Eight Below	Katie	Moon Bloodgood	
2006	American Pie Presents: The Naked Mile	Brandy	Candace Kroslak	
2006	The Last Time	Belisa	Amber Valletta	
2006	Flushed Away	Rita Malone (voice)	Kate Winslet	
2006	Brother Bear 2	Nita	Mandy Moore	
2006	Apocalypto	Seven	Dalia Hernández	
2006	Salvador	Cuca	Leonor Watling	
2007	88 Minutes	Lauren Douglas	Leelee Sobieski	
2007	Disturbia	Ashley Carlson	Sarah Roemer	
2007	Elizabeth: The Golden Age	Bess Throckmorton	Abbie Cornish	
2007	The Jane Austen Book Club	Allegra	Maggie Grace	
2007	Return to House on Haunted Hill	Ariel Wolfe	Amanda Righetti	
2008	The Rocker	Amelia Stone	Emma Stone	
2008	RocknRolla	Stella	Thandie Newton	
2008	The Incredible Hulk	Betty Ross	Liv Tyler	
2008	Definitely, Maybe	Summer Hartley	Rachel Weisz	
2009	The Private Lives of Pippa Lee	Young Pippa	Blake Lively	
2009	The Lovely Bones	Abigail Salmon	Rachel Weisz	
2009	The Young Victoria	Queen Victoria	Emily Blunt	
2009	Fast & Furious	Letty Ortiz	Michelle Rodriguez	
2009	Watchmen	Silk Spectre	Malin Åkerman	
2009	Nine	Claudia Jenssen	Nicole Kidman	
2009	12 Rounds	Molly Porter	Ashley Scott	
2009	American Pie Presents: The Book of Love	Heidi	Beth Behrs	
2009	Dragonball Evolution	Mai	Eriko Tamura	
2009	The Last Station	Sasha Tolstoy	Anne-Marie Duff	
2009	Le Concert	Anne-Marie Jacquet, Lea Strum	Mélanie Laurent	
2009	Pandorum	Nadia	Antje Traue	
2009	Zombieland	Wichita	Emma Stone	
2009	The Detonator (TV Tokyo edition)	Nadia Cominski	Silvia Colloca	
2009	Cloudy with a Chance of Meatballs	Sam Sparks	Anna Faris	
2010	The Social Network	Marylin Delpy	Rashida Jones	
2010	Tron: Legacy	Gem	Beau Garrett	
2010	Monsters	Samantha Wynden	Whitney Able	
2010	Clash of the Titans	Io	Gemma Arterton	
2010	Megamind	Roxanne Ritchi	Tina Fey	
2011	Dream House	Libby Atenton	Rachel Weisz	
2011	Green Lantern	Carol Ferris	Blake Lively	
2011	Sucker Punch	Sweet Pea	Abbie Cornish	
2011	Red Riding Hood	Valerie	Amanda Seyfried	
2011	Conan the Barbarian	Tamara	Rachel Nichols	
2011	Immortals	Phaedra	Freida Pinto	
2011	The Help	Hilly Walters Holbrook	Bryce Dallas Howard	
2011	X-Men: First Class	Emma Frost	January Jones	
2011	In Time (2025 BS10 Star Channel edition)	Rachel	Olivia Wilde	
2011	The Darkest Hour	Anne	Rachael Taylor	
2012	Celeste and Jesse Forever	Celeste Martin	Rashida Jones	
2012	Iron Sky	Renate Richter	Julia Dietze	
2012	The Five-Year Engagement	Violet Barnes	Emily Blunt	
2012	Looper	Sara	Emily Blunt	
2013	Oz the Great and Powerful	Evanora	Rachel Weisz	
2013	Hansel & Gretel: Witch Hunters	Gretel	Gemma Arterton	
2013	Fast & Furious 6	Letty Ortiz	Michelle Rodriguez	
2013	About Time	Charlotte	Margot Robbie	
2013	Mood Indigo	Chloé	Audrey Tautou	
2013	The Hobbit: The Desolation of Smaug	Tauriel	Evangeline Lilly	
2013	Cloudy with a Chance of Meatballs 2	Sam Sparks	Anna Faris	
2014	The Hobbit: The Battle of the Five Armies	Tauriel	Evangeline Lilly	
2014	The Water Diviner	Ayshe	Olga Kurylenko	
2014	Dick	Betsy Jones	Kirsten Dunst	
2014	Devil's Due	Samantha McCall	Allison Miller	
2014	Planes: Fire & Rescue	Dottie	Teri Hatcher	
2014	Beauty and the Beast	Princesse	Yvonne Catterfeld	
2015	Furious 7	Letty Ortiz-Toretto	Michelle Rodriguez	
2015	Crimson Peak	Lady Lucille Sharpe	Jessica Chastain	
2015	Lake Placid vs. Anaconda	Tiffani	Laura Dale	
2015	The Meddler	Lori Minervini	Rose Byrne	
2015	Mission: Impossible – Rogue Nation	Ilsa Faust	Rebecca Ferguson	
2016	Jason Bourne (2022 BS Tokyo edition	Heather Lee	Alicia Vikander	
2016	Pete's Dragon	Grace Meacham	Bryce Dallas Howard	
2016	Batman v Superman: Dawn of Justice	Diana Prince/Wonder Woman	Gal Gadot	
2016	Triple 9	Elena Vlaslov	Gal Gadot	
2016	Colossal	Gloria	Anne Hathaway	
2016	The Shallows	Nancy Adams	Blake Lively	
2016	Ratchet & Clank	Elaris	Rosario Dawson	
2016	The Girl with All the Gifts	Helen Justineau	Gemma Arterton	
2017	My Cousin Rachel	Rachel Ashley	Rachel Weisz	
2017	Wonder Woman	Diana Prince/Wonder Woman	Gal Gadot	
2017	Justice League	Diana Prince/Wonder Woman	Gal Gadot	
2017	The Fate of the Furious	Letty Ortiz-Toretto	Michelle Rodriguez	
2018	Ocean's 8	Daphne Kluger	Anne Hathaway	
2018	Tomb Raider	Lara Croft	Alicia Vikander	
2018	Mission: Impossible – Fallout	Ilsa Faust	Rebecca Ferguson	
2018	Spider-Man: Into the Spider-Verse	Mary Jane Watson	Zoë Kravitz	
2019	Just Mercy	Eva Ansley	Brie Larson	
2019	Murder Mystery	Grace Ballard	Gemma Arterton	
2019	Between Two Ferns: The Movie	Gal Gadot	Gal Gadot	
2019	Godzilla: King of the Monsters	Dr. Ilene Chen, Dr. Ling Chen	Zhang Ziyi	
2020	Rogue	Samantha O'Hara	Megan Fox	
2020	Wonder Woman 1984	Diana Prince/Wonder Woman	Gal Gadot	
2021	Zack Snyder's Justice League	Diana Prince/Wonder Woman	Gal Gadot	
2021	Red Notice	Sarah Black	Gal Gadot	
2021	F9	Letty Ortiz	Michelle Rodriguez	
2021	Locked Down	Linda	Anne Hathaway	
2021	Space Jam: A New Legacy	Wonder Woman	Rosario Dawson	
2022	The Bad Guys	Diane Foxington	Zazie Beetz	
2022	Death on the Nile	Linnet Ridgeway-Doyle	Gal Gadot	
2022	Scream	Sheriff Judy Hicks	Marley Shelton	
2022	Doctor Strange in the Multiverse of Madness	Clea	Charlize Theron	
2022	High Heat	Ana	Olga Kurylenko	
2023	Expend4bles	Gina	Megan Fox	
2023	Mission: Impossible – Dead Reckoning Part One	Ilsa Faust	Rebecca Ferguson	
2023	Shazam! Fury of the Gods	Diana Prince/Wonder Woman	Gal Gadot	
2023	The Flash	Diana Prince/Wonder Woman	Gal Gadot	
2023	Heart of Stone	Rachel Stone	Gal Gadot	
2023	Dungeons & Dragons: Honor Among Thieves	Holga the Barbarian	Michelle Rodriguez	
2023	Fast X	Letty Ortiz-Toretto	Michelle Rodriguez	
2023	Resident Evil: Death Island	Claire Redfield	Stephanie Panisello	
2024	IF	Octopuss	Blake Lively	
2024	It Ends with Us	Lily Bloom	Blake Lively	
2025	Flight Risk	Madolyn Harris	Michelle Dockery	
2025	Wolf Man	Charlotte Lovell	Julia Garner	
2026	Mercy	Judge Maddox	Rebecca Ferguson	
2026	Goat	Jett Fillmore	Gabrielle Union	
2026	In the Grey	Rachel Wild	Eiza González	

=== Television ===
Show year(s)	Title	Character	Original actor	Notes	Refs
2001–2009	Smallville	Lana Lang	Kristin Kreuk	Series ran 2001–2011	
2003–2009	ER	Dr. Neela Rasgotra	Parminder Nagra	Series ran 1994–2009; character introduced in season 10	
2007–2012	Gossip Girl	Serena van der Woodsen	Blake Lively		
2010–2015	Downton Abbey	Lady Mary Crawley	Michelle Dockery		
2013–2021	The Blacklist	Elizabeth "Liz" Keen	Megan Boone	Series ran 2013–2023	
2015–2018	12 Monkeys	Dr. Cassandra Railly	Amanda Schull		
2016	Vinyl	Devon Finestra	Olivia Wilde		
2016–2017	House of Cards	LeAnn Harvey	Neve Campbell	Series ran 2013–2018; character introduced in season 4	
2016–2021	NCIS: New Orleans	Tammy Gregorio	Vanessa Ferlito	Series ran 2014–2021; character introduced in season 3	
2020	Deadwater Fell	Kate Kendrick	Anna Madeley		
2020	Mrs. America	Alice Macray	Sarah Paulson		
2021–2024	Arcane	Caitlyn Kiramman	Katie Leung		
2022–2024	Halo	Kai-125	Kate Kennedy		
