= List of Kurokami: The Animation episodes =

Kurokami: The Animation is an anime series adapted from the manga of the same title originally published by Square Enix and serialized in Young Gangan. Produced by Sunrise and directed by directed by Tsuneo Kobayashi, the series had an advance screening of episode 1 on December 27, 2008, before it began broadcasting on TV Asahi on January 8, 2009. The anime's opening song "Sympathizer" is sung by Minami Kuribayashi and the ending song "Irodori no Nai Sekai" (彩の無い世界) by Yōsei Teikoku with the second opening song "tRANCE" done by GRANRODEO. The second ending song "Gekkou no Chigiri" 月光の契り is also sung by Yōsei Teikoku also.

The show centers on Keita Ibuki, who is portrayed as a high school student instead of a computer programmer from the manga, being drawn in a secret conflict concerning the Mototsumitamas. Together with Kuro and Akane, Keita tries to find out why his mother died after seeing her double and find out who wants to destabilize the coexistence balance on Earth.

Word of an anime adaptation of Black God came from Young Gangan's 20th issue with the announcement regarding the creation of Kurokami: The Animation. A promotional video of Kurokami: The Animation was broadcast on the internet. Bandai Entertainment announced that Kurokami: The Animation was officially licensed in North America, and would air first on January 8, 2009, simultaneously in Japan on TV Asahi and in the United States on ImaginAsian, followed by South Korea on January 9, 2009, on AniBOX. Also on May 18, Bandai Entertainment uploaded onto YouTube and Crunchyroll the first 19 episodes as well as the special in English Dubbed form. Later episodes were episode on a week-by-week basis; the entire series is currently available to watch online on YouTube.

Bandai released the Blu-ray and DVD sets of the anime in March 2010. Following the 2012 closure of Bandai Entertainment, Sunrise announced at Otakon 2013, that Sentai Filmworks has rescued Kurokami, along with a handful of other former BEI titles. On October 16, 2023, Discotek Media announced that they had licensed the show for a 2024 release.

== Episodes ==
=== Season 1 ===
No.	Title	Original release date
1	"Doppeliner (Doppeliner System)"; Transliteration: "Sanmi Ichizai" (Japanese: 三位一在)	January 8, 2009
Keita Ibuki is currently a high school student living alone in Tokyo while being assisted by his father, who remits money for his allowance, and daily visits by his old childhood friend Akane Sano after his mother dies from an encounter with her own Doppeliner as a young boy. After seeing the spitting image of someone with the same looks as his own mother, Keita visits a ramen shop when Kuro shows up with her pet dog Punipuni. After Kuro receives her ramen from Keita, she is severely attacked by an unknown assailant who was ordered to capture Kuro alive at all costs, despite Keita trying to stop him. He later meets with one of his neighbors, a young girl named Mayu, only to watch a speeding truck run her over after she claims that she had met her double.
2	"Pact"; Transliteration: "Keiyaku" (Japanese: 契約)	January 15, 2009
Keita, after having fed Kuro, encounters a Tribal End named Seiji sent to capture her alive after the previous encounter at the ramen stop was deemed to be a failure, due to the Tribal End's defeat at Kuro's hands. In the midst of the fighting, Keita is killed when his heart was pierced by the Seiji's mysterious Exceed Energy in an attempt to fight Kuro. To save Keita before he dies from his fatal wounds, Kuro decides to issue a Contract between them by exchanging their hearts after she brought him to safety. Kuro is able to defeat Seiji by electrocuting him after she created the pact with Keita successfully.
3	"Synchronization (Synchro)"; Transliteration: "Shinkuro" (Japanese: シンクロ)	January 22, 2009
Keita now has some new problems with Kuro, regarding the concept of Synchro, as he felt his entire life had changed after Kuro issued the Contract. It was until Keita, finding out that his teacher Tsubota is a covert Tribal End agent, realizes that Kuro was right all along, thus teaming up with her to defeat Tsubota, after he initially gains the upper hand against Kuro, due to issues of synchronizing properly with Keita. The two escape from school, leaving an unconscious Tsubota behind, after Kuro was able to incapacitate him through synchronization, allowing her Exceed abilities to be in effect against her opponent.
4	"Pursuer (Tracker)"; Transliteration: "Tsuisekisha" (Japanese: 追跡者)	January 29, 2009
Excel and Steiner, having arrived in Japan, conduct a covert mission to test Akane if she has strong Tera Energy flowing throughout her body. Later on, Akane meets with Keita and Kuro in a small restaurant after being followed secretly by Excel and Steiner from the local bank where she works as a bank teller. However, the three are ambushed by Tribal End bikers sent to apprehend Kuro and eliminate Keita and Akane. However, Kuro, failing to defeat the bikers herself, is intervened by Steiner, who then drives them away.
5	"Exceed"; Transliteration: "Ikushiido" (Japanese: イクシード)	February 5, 2009
Steiner faces off against Kuro in a one-on-one match, to the point where the two Tera Guardians show off their Exceed skills and place the match evenly, however Steiner later subdues Kuro for the count due to his superior skills against her. Despite Kuro and Keita's defeat by Steiner, Excel offers to bring them home with Akane. The two Noble One operatives disclose information regarding the death of Keita's mother when they show a photo of her supposedly in a covert operation conducted in Okinawa under the command of Hiyou, bringing Keita bad memories regarding the death of his mother years ago as a child.
6	"Contractor of the Subs (Sub Contractee)"; Transliteration: "Sabu No Keiyakusha" (Japanese: サブの契約者)	February 12, 2009
Keita is kidnapped from the streets of Tokyo by Mikami Hojo in order to lure in Kuro. Once at the mansion, the two Tera Guardians challenge each other to a fistfight. Both use their Exceed moves in order to overpower each other and gain an advantage, but Mikami loses the match when her Sub Contractee Shingo collapses and dies, due to health complications from synchronizing with Mikami, having caused him to rapidly age. Seeing that he had die, Mikami no longer wishes to fight them and allows them to leave the mansion grounds for good.
7	"Kuro's Past"; Transliteration: "Kuro No Kako" (Japanese: クロの過去)	February 19, 2009
Kuro encounters Yakumo, the ex-ward of Reishin before he massacred most of his tribal clan, in the streets of Tokyo with his new contractee named Riona Kogure. Kuro tells Keita how she came to Earth, revealing her origins as the princess of his tribe and the tragic history of her tribesmen after Reishin was told by her mother that he could alter the destiny of the world, leading it either to prosperity or to its doom. Hiyou appears at the airport and fights Kuro before he decides to retreat. Excel, along with Steiner, sees Keita and the others at the airport, as she gives him her Thousand as a gift to help him fight alongside Kuro.
8	"The Flame-Horse Clan (The Hiba Clan)"; Transliteration: "Hiba Ichizoku" (Japanese: 緋馬一族)	February 26, 2009
Kuro, Keita, and Akane head to Okinawa, staying with Keita's grandfather in order to confirm whether Keita's mother had really died when he was young or not and what to investigate in the island. The three later come across Kakuma and Makana, survivors of the Hiba Clan, who mistake Kuro to be after a Tera Stone within the area. Meanwhile, Reishin has started plans to gather all the Master Roots under the protection of the Kaionji Group, with the assistance of Daichi Kuraki. As the trio continue to enjoy their Okinawa vacation, Hiyou and Shinobu Nanase arrive in Okinawa as well, preparing for another mission to locate the Tera Stone.
9	"Shadow of My Mother"; Transliteration: "Haha No Kage" (Japanese: 母の影)	March 5, 2009
Excel and Steiner lead a group of The Noble One members in a raid on the main headquarters of the Kaionji Group in Tokyo, but Reishin flees to safety after engaging Steiner in combat. Kuro trains in martial arts under Keita's grandfather in order to improve her skills. Keita, by chance, encounters Shinobu, his mother's double, who attempts to steal his Tera Energy. While Keita defeats her, Kuro is kidnapped outside the residence of Keita's grandfather by Hiyou himself after having attacked Makana.
10	"The End (Outcome)"; Transliteration: "Matsuro" (Japanese: 末路)	March 12, 2009
Keita heads off to rescue Kuro, held prisoner by Hiyou, while Makana runs off to rescue Kakuma, held hostage by Reishin. However, Shinobu, having survived the attack by Keita back at the beach, continues to drain Keita's Tera Energy. She tells him that she was responsible for killing Keita's mother because of her miserable life, hoping for improvement after becoming a Minus Root by making a contract with Hiyou. Keita and Kuro manage to synchronize and defeat Hiyou, but Shinobu dies as she was not able to tap into Keita's Tera Energy to make herself stronger. Keita and Kuro leave the cave with Shinobu's body and encounter Kuraki before Keita collapses, coughing up blood.
11	"Reunion"; Transliteration: "Saikai" (Japanese: 再開)	March 19, 2009
Keita, Kuro, and Akane hide with Kuraki in his cottage. Kuraki reveals states that he is trying to undermine the Kaionji Group and the Shishigami Clan. He tells Keita that he is really Shun Sawamura, Keita's school friend who was supposedly killed when he jumped in front of a train. Kuraki also tells Keita that he wishes to defeat the clan because of their totalitarian dreams of making the Earth fit for Tera Guardians to rule. Kuro voices her objections to Kuraki's plans, saying the Doppeliner System is not a weapon to be used. Meanwhile, Kakuma is killed by Raiga, a Tera Guardian of the Hima clan, to gain the power to defeat Reishin.
12	"Fierce Fighting (Confrontation)"; Transliteration: "Gekitou" (Japanese: 激闘)	March 26, 2009
Kuro, Yakumo, and Riona take Keita to safety while Excel and Steiner engage Reishin to prevent him using the Tera Stone for conducting genocide. Outside the Tera Stone cave, Keita's group are ambushed by a Kaionji Group of bodyguards but they are easily defeated by Yakumo and Riona. Steiner is unable to defeat Reishin, and so he uses one of his clones to carry the unconscious Excel outside to safety. Suddenly, Kuraki appears at the Tera Stone with Raiga, ambushing Reishin using his Shidin Sword. Raiga reveals that he killed Kakuma to access the Pure Place and gain the energy required to battle Reishin. Following his defeat, Reishin is sucked into a wormhole, creating a shockwave which reaches the Okinawa mainland.
Special	"Intermission"; Transliteration: "Makuai" (Japanese: 休憩)	April 9, 2009
Keita narrates a recapitulation of events spanning from his encounter with Kuro to his involvement with her. He explains the changes in his life that he has endured since meeting Kuro and getting mixed up with the plans of the Tera Guardians and the Shishigami Clan to rebuild the world as Reishin saw fit for his own personal utopia.

=== Season 2 ===
No.	Title	Original release date
13	"New World"; Transliteration: "Shinsekai" (Japanese: 新世界)	April 9, 2009
Daichi Kuraki begins his plans to establish his own brand of utopia throughout whole world. The Kaionji Group's influence exceeds that of the Noble Ones, forcing them to leave Japanese soil. A few Noble One agents disobey orders and remain in Japan, supporting Kuro and Yakumo to protect Keita Ibuki as he is still in a coma. Tera Guardians of the Kaionji Group raid the Noble One's headquarters in an attempt to capture Kuro and Keita alive. However, Keita finally awakens and unleashes his full potential enabling Kuro to defeat the attempted infiltration by the Kaionji Group.
14	"Breach (Breakthrough)"; Transliteration: "Toppakou" (Japanese: 突破口)	April 16, 2009
After Reishin's disappearance, the Chairman of the Kaionji clan announces that Yuki Kaionji is to be engaged to Kuraki who will become Vice-Chairman, to the disgust of the Kaionji children. Meanwhile, Keita remains hiding in building ruins of the flooded portions of Okinawa to avoid detection by the Kaoiji Group intelligence agency, however he is desperate to save Akane Sano from Kuraki. During Kuraki's inauguration ceremony, attended by the Master Roots at the Kaionji hotel ballroom, Bernhard leads a group of Noble One operatives with Yakumo and Riona to rescue Akane while Keita and Kuro personally confront Kuraki. Meanwhile, Yuki threatens to kill Akane in order to end her own misery as a Sub, and retain her place in the Kaionji clan.
15	"Carnage"; Transliteration: "Shura" (Japanese: 修羅)	April 23, 2009
Yuki hesitates before shooting Akane and is disarmed by Kuraki who threatens to kill her. However, Akane prevents Kuraki from shooting Yuki, defending her right to live. Meanwhile, Yakumo encounters Shinra, a Tera Guardian formerly with the Shishigami clan who supported Reishin. Kuro and Keita arrive to find Yakumo injured and Shinra, now supporting Kuraki, attacks Kuro. Shinra's Contractee is the young Master Root of Mayu, with a strong flow of Tera, and proves too strong for Kuro. However, Keita uses his Thousands ring to collapse the ceiling on Shira, bringing down Yuki and Akane from the room above. Yuki leads Akane to a waiting helicopter, but Keita's group are intercepted by Raiga who attacks them. Kuro and Keita assist Yakumo to escape while Yuki and Akane evacuate in the helicopter, but it malfunctions, crashing into the sea. Kuraki and Raiga arrive to confront Keita with the Master Root of himself.
16	"Collapse (Ruin)"; Transliteration: "Houkai" (Japanese: 崩壊)	April 30, 2009
Kuro faces off against Raiga, but Shinra attacks first. Using both Synchro and her Exceed, Megaexe, Kuro defeats Shinra then faces Raiga. Raiga overwhelms Kuro due to the strength of his Exceed Energy and Keita's reducing Tera Energy. Keita collapses from exhaustion and Tera Energy depletion and briefly dies. However he undergoes rebirth with his Tera Energy now doubled, enabling Kuro to defeat Raiga with a massive Exceed attack. Keita and Kuro celebrate their victory, while Bernhard and June secure the Kaionji Group hotel. Suddenly, the Pure Place island appears near Japan, and people without Contracts with Tera Guardians collapse all over the world, leading to chaos with a near breakdown in society. Reishin, is shown on the Pure Place where he has reverted to his former appearance.
17	"The Sincere God (Masagami)"; Transliteration: "Masagami" (Japanese: 真神 (まさがみ))	May 7, 2009
The people on the mainland appear to have only fainted, drained of their Tera. Kuro and Keita cross to the Pure Place island along with Yakumo and Riona. They meet Namu, the historian and caretaker of the island who tells them the history of the Masagami, Motosumitama, humans and Tera and how the Dopliner system is a curse placed on humans by the Masagami. The four are then confronted by a Tera Guardian named Aragi of the Ginko clan with his Contractee Sora hoping to keep them away from the Pure Place. The two clash with Kuro and Keita who are able to defeat Aragi using their newly found Exceed skill. Meanwhile, Bernhard and some of the surviving German High Council Tera Guardians encounter Reishin elsewhere in the Pure Place. Even though facing superior numbers, Reishin is able to defeat them, leaving June as the only survivor.
18	"The Accident (Cataclysm)"; Transliteration: "Ihen" (Japanese: 異変)	May 14, 2009
Excel asks Mikami Hojo to form a commercial Contract to avenge Steiner. Keita goes on ahead with Kuro, who senses a Tera Guardian deep within the forest. Suddenly, Keita and Kuro are attacked by Kohaku and Tenma. Meanwhile, Nam heals Yakumo by altering his flow of Tera in exchange for food, in defiance of her observer status. Keita and Kuro manage to defeat the Mototsumitama with some help from PuniPuni, but are then trapped in a towering plant. Meanwhile, Excel and Mikami find Reishin, and they engage in battle against him, motivated by the deaths of their respective former Contractees, Steiner and Shingo. They seem to get the upper hand, however, as Mikami attempts to deliver the final blow, Reishin causes an explosion, leading to Mikami's defeat. Excel warns the others when they arrive that Reishin now has a Contractee.
19	"Abyss"; Transliteration: "Senjin" (Japanese: 千尋)	May 21, 2009
Keita and Kuro catch up with Reishin where they realize that Akane is still alive and has formed a Contract with him. Keita and Kuro vow to destroy the Doppeliner System because of the many lives it has sacrificed. Initially, they seem to be outmatched against Reishin and Akane, but as the battle continues, Keita's Thousand and Kuro's Exceed attacks appear to give them an advantage. However, Akane is able to boost her Tera Energy, enabling Reishin to knock Kuro unconscious. As the exhausted Keita struggles to understand Akane's motives, Reishin reveals that Akane chose to join him of her own free will.
20	"Awakening"; Transliteration: "Kakusei" (Japanese: 覚醒)	May 28, 2009
Reishin and Akane enter a shrine containing the Master Tera Stone and absorbs its Tera, destroying its Earth Seal. The stone releases the Masagami, a dark entity that releases ghosts which are physical manifestations of malice. Namu realizes that they are heading for Kuro, the Shishigami princess. Everyone tries to stop them reaching her and Namu carries Kuro and Keita to safety. In a flashback, Reishin recalls when the Shishigami Clan planned to kill Kuro whom they thought was the reincarnation of the Masagami. He disagreed with their intentions and in the ensuing battle, Reishin wiped out the Shishigami Clan. He then offered the sacrifice of his own mother, the shrine maiden, to the Tera Stone in order to release the Shishigami Clan from the curse of the Masagami. It is because of this that he formed a Contract with Akane in the present to break the curse of the Masagami once and for all. As Kuro awakens from her stasis, a surge of Tera Energy is released, revealing that she is one of the three Masagami.
21	"The God (Deity)"; Transliteration: "Shinpen" (Japanese: 神変)	June 4, 2009
The battle begins between the two Masagami warriors and Reishin, and he is pounded in separate attacks of magma and ice. Keita and Kuro now understand that Reishin always sought to protect Kuro from becoming one of the three Masagami and contributing to the destruction of the world. With the aid of Akane's Thousand, Reishin unleashes an immense Exceed attack on the flaming and icy bodies of the two Masagami, destroying them. However, they begin to regenerate as Kuro awaken and she is revealed to be the third Masagami. With her powerful electrical energy, she joins the other two Masagami in attacking Reishin. Keita desperately calls out to bring Kuro her back to her senses, reminding her of their Contract. He succeeds in reaching her, and after they synchronize, she turns against the two other Masagami. The Masagami pair then attack Keita, but Reishin intercepts them. He makes one last powerful move against the Masagami, but he dies after draining all his Tera Energy.
22	"Fate (Destiny)"; Transliteration: "Unmei" (Japanese: 運命)	June 11, 2009
The flame and ice Masagami merge to avoid their possible death and attain a new power. However, they are finally annihilated when Keita and Akane combine their Tera Energy to allow Kuro to perform an ultimate Exceed attack. Eventually, life returns to normal, though Keita later discovers that the Doppeliner System has not ceased. Kuro, blames herself for the situation and takes Keita to the ramen shop one last time. The next morning she leaves quietly to return to the Pure Place. As she walks, Kuro stops and bids a tearful farewell to Keita, still back at the apartment but he contacts and bonds with her through synchronization, cheering her up. Later Yakumo follows to accompany her. Nam leaves as well, recording that due to the presence of a Tera Guardian in the sacred precinct, the Masagami curse and Doppeliner System have faded away.
23	"Path"; Transliteration: "Michi" (Japanese: 道)	June 18, 2009
In a series of flashbacks, Kuro looks back at her journey from living with her family, meeting and forming a Contract with Keita, to returning to the Pure Place; Akane looks back from her time of residing with Keita to forming a Contract with Reishin and the destruction of the Masagami. Back in the present, after the ending of the Doppeliner System, Akane and Keita get married. Several decades later, Kuro receives a telepathic message from a very old and dying Keita. He tells her that he will take the curse with him, thanking her for giving him a happy life. Keita dies as the still young Kuro gratefully thanks her Contractee for everything he has done.
24	"Side Chapter「Tiger and Wings」 (The Tigress and the Wing)"; Transliteration: "gaiden「tora to tsubasa」" (Japanese: 外伝「虎と翼」)	Unaired/DVD Only
The story behind the first encounter between Excel and Steiner is explained. It later shows how Excel partnered with Mikami after she vowed to avenge the death of Steiner.
