= List of Queen's Blade Rebellion episodes =

Queen's Blade: Rebellion is a 2012 anime television series based on the Queen's Blade series of gamebooks by Hobby Japan. Set after the events of the original Queen Blade, Gainos and the entire Continent have fallen under a tyrannical rule led by Claudette, the Thundercloud Queen. The series focuses on Annelotte, an exiled knight who leads a band of rebels in her fight to overthrow the Queen.

The anime is produced by Arms under the directorship of Yousei Morino, with the script written by Hideki Shirane, music by Masaru Yokoyama, and characters by Rin-Sin, Takayuki Noguchi, and Yukiko Ishibashi. The anime aired on AT-X from April 3, 2012, to June 19, 2012, with subsequent broadcasts on Tokyo MX, Chiba TV, Sun Television, and BS11. AT-X airings are uncensored, while the airings on Tokyo MX and other channels are heavily censored. Six DVD and Blu-ray volumes will later be released by Media Factory, starting from June 27, 2012. Each DVD/BD volume will contain an OVA short entitled "What Will It Look Like When It Smashes Through Restrictions!?" (限界突破で見えちゃうの, Genkai Toppa de Miechau no!?).

An OVA anime adaptation of Rebellion was bundled with the Queen's Blade Premium Visual Book and Queen's Blade Rebellion Premium Visual Book on DVD prior to the anime's official announcement. Serving as prologues, the OVAs take place after the events of Queen's Blade: Beautiful Fighters. The first set of OVAs were released on October 29, 2011, while the second set of OVAs were released on January 28, 2012. Simulcasts of the Rebellion anime are provided by Crunchyroll, starting from April 12, 2012. The anime is licensed in North America by Sentai Filmworks.

The opening theme for the series is "I Can Hear the Song of Life" (命のうたが聞こえる, Inochi no Uta ga Kikoeru) by Naomi Tamura, while the ending theme is "future is serious" by Aika Kobayashi. Both songs were released as CD singles on April 25, 2012.

== Episode list ==
=== OVA Prelude (2011–2012) ===
| No. | Title | Original release date |
|---|---|---|
| 1 | "A New Disciple, a New Battle"; Transliteration: "Aratanaru Shitei, Aratanaru Tatakai" (Japanese: 新たなる師弟、新たなる闘い) | October 29, 2011 |
After ascending the queen's throne, Claudette has launched an ambitious war to conquer other kingdoms. One of her many victims, Annelotte Kreutz, is forced to flee her land but is determined to defeat Claudette and save her people one day. As fate would have it she meets Combat Instructor Alleyne and eventually becomes her new disciple, training to become a stronger fighter. And if you stick with them till the end, you the viewer will also have a chance to become Alleyne's new disciple in the "Grueling Boot Camp" special episode – where Alleyne will personally provide you one-on-one supervision on a stringent exercise regime.
| 2 | "A Saint's Agony: The Door of Faith Reopens"; Transliteration: "Seijo no Hanmon 〜Shinkō no Tobira wa, Mata Hiraku〜" (Japanese: 聖女の煩悶 〜信仰の扉は、また開く〜) | January 28, 2012 |
Sigui, a nun of the Holy Dynasty, travels to the capital Gainos to worship in the Grand Cathedral. On her journey she meets Iron Princess Ymir who is peddling her cheap imitation weapons as usual, and with her help Sigui overcomes various obstacles, saving a sick child and burning some bandits and heretics along the way. In the end Sigui is bestowed the title of Inquisitor and granted the Holy Flame Mace as her weapon. And if you manage to survive her "cleansing fire", you the viewer has a chance to practice Holy Poses in the "Sigui's Passionate Holy Pose Lessons" special episode – where Sigui will personally provide you one-on-one demonstration of her Holy Poses.

=== Queen's Blade: Rebellion (2012) ===
| No. | Title | Original release date |
|---|---|---|
| 1 | "Warrior of the Resistance"; Transliteration: "Hanran no Tōshi" (Japanese: 叛乱の闘士) | April 3, 2012 |
After Alchemy Strategist Yuit saves her friend Mirim from harassment by the queen's soldiers with the help of her elfen automaton Vante, Ymir shows up at her village the next day trying to procure Vante for the queen's military. Yuit finds an opportunity to escape but is later ambushed by Elina. Just when she almost falls off a cliff, Annelotte appears to rescue her and defeat Elina. However, when she returns home she finds that Mirim has been coerced into joining the queen's army with false promises of money to treat her mother's illness by Ymir.
| 2 | "The Sacred War"; Transliteration: "Seinaru Tatakai" (Japanese: 聖なる戦い) | April 10, 2012 |
Seeking guidance from the church, Annelotte unwittingly angers the overzealous Inquisitor Sigui and is challenged to a duel. Annelotte must fight for her life as being declared a heretic by Sigui automatically comes with a sentence to be burned alive by holy fire. Fortunately, just when all hope is lost an octopus comes to the rescue. Elsewhere, Iron Strategist Ymir sets her evil plan into motion.
| 3 | "The Moonlight from the Jungle and the Sun"; Transliteration: "Mitsurin no Tsukikage to Taiyō" (Japanese: 密林の月影と太陽) | April 17, 2012 |
On a mission to clear the mysterious fog that's preventing transportation of life-saving medicine, Annelotte travels to the Calibara forest where she meets Moon Shadow Dancer Luna Luna and fights a giant slimy monster. And yes, there will be tentacles.
| 4 | "The Unstopping Hyper Vibration"; Transliteration: "Tomaranai Chōshindō" (Japanese: 止まらない超振動) | April 24, 2012 |
Mirim has been equipped with the Hyper Vibration Armor and armed with the Hyper Vibration Sword "Infinite Slasher" by Ymir, who sends her to fight Annelotte under the queen's order.
| 5 | "The Secret of the Castle at Gainos"; Transliteration: "Gainosu-shiro no Himitsu" (Japanese: ガイノス城の秘密) | May 1, 2012 |
Annelotte sneaks into Gainos Castle with Yuit and Vante to rescue Mirim, but she must get past Dragon Warrior Branwen first.
| 6 | "A Crown of Flowers and the Hidden Power"; Transliteration: "Hanakazari to Himerareta Chikara" (Japanese: 花飾りと秘められた力) | May 8, 2012 |
Annelotte finally confronts Mirim and her nearly invincible Hyper Vibration Armor, and in the middle of the fierce showdown, Captain Liliana's flying pirate ship suddenly appears in the sky above.
| 7 | "The Flying Pirate Ship"; Transliteration: "Soratobu Kaizoku-sen" (Japanese: 空飛ぶ海賊船) | May 15, 2012 |
Vante is captured by Liliana, and Annelotte and Yuit must sneak on board her flying pirate ship to retrieve Vante. But they are not the only stowaways there.
| 8 | "The Tempted Young Wife"; Transliteration: "Sasowareta Wakaoku-sama" (Japanese: 誘われた若奥様) | May 22, 2012 |
Ymir recruits Summoner Aldra to join the queen's army. Aldra summons two underworld demons, Belphe and Dogor, to aid in her fight, but they are more interested in finding some tasty humans to feed on.
| 9 | "A Samurai Arrives"; Transliteration: "Samurai Kenzan" (Japanese: サムライ見参) | May 29, 2012 |
Annelotte accidentally travels to a small village of orphaned children, where she meets the self-proclaimed "Samurai God" Izumi. Realizing that Annelotte is a stronger and more skilled fighter, Izumi asks Annelotte to teach her better swordsmanship. And not a moment too soon, for the underworld demons Belphe and Dogor just appeared in their village to eat the children.
| 10 | "An Angel, a Trap, and the Queen's True Motive"; Transliteration: "Tenshi to Wana to Jo Ō no Shin'in" (Japanese: 天使と罠と女王の真意) | June 5, 2012 |
Annelotte and her band of rebels return to Gainos Castle with the intention of confronting the queen head-on, but Ymir has anticipated their arrival and set a dangerous trap for them.
| 11 | "Wavering Spirit"; Transliteration: "Furueru Tōshi" (Japanese: 震える闘志) | June 12, 2012 |
Fierce battles rage across the castle as the forces of good clash with the forces of evil. Amidst the climatic showdown, a sinister secret is revealed.
| 12 | "Bonds of the Resistance"; Transliteration: "Hanran no Kizuna" (Japanese: 叛乱の絆) | June 19, 2012 |
Annelotte finally comes face-to-face with Thundercloud Queen Claudette, and the fate of the continent will be decided by the one who emerges victorious.

== OVA Specials ==
=== Exposed As I Push The Limits!? ===
| No. | Title | Original release date |
|---|---|---|
| 1 | "In Training! Annelotte's Holy Poses"; Transliteration: "Tokkun! Annerotte no Seinaru Pōzu" (Japanese: 特訓! アンネロッテの聖なるポーズ) | June 27, 2012 |
| 2 | "Vibrations! Mirim's Armor Comes Off"; Transliteration: "Shindō! Mirimu no Nama Kigae" (Japanese: 振動！ミリムの生着替え) | July 25, 2012 |
| 3 | "Humiliation! Branwen is Broken"; Transliteration: "Kutsujoku! Chōkyō Sareru Buranwen" (Japanese: 屈辱！調教されるブランウェン) | August 29, 2012 |
| 4 | "Spa! Liliana's Graceful Esthetics"; Transliteration: "Onsen! Ririana no Yūga naru Bigaku" (Japanese: 温泉！リリアナの優雅なる美学) | September 26, 2012 |
| 5 | "Shoot Her! My Neighbor Aldra"; Transliteration: "Totsugeki! Tonari no Arudora" (Japanese: 突撃！となりのアルドラ) | October 24, 2012 |
| 6 | "Melee! Annelotte and Her Step-Sisters Intertwined"; Transliteration: "Konsen! Motsureau Annerotte to Gishi Imōto-tachi" (Japanese: 混線！もつれ合うアンネロッテと義姉妹たち) | November 28, 2012 |
