= List of Black Bullet episodes =

- Cover of the first Blu-ray volume released by NBCUniversal Entertainment in Japan on July 2, 2014, featuring Rentaro Satomi & Enju Aihara.
- No. of episodes: 13

Release
- Original network: AT-X
- Original release: April 8 – July 1, 2014

Black Bullet is a 2014 science fiction Japanese anime series adapted from the light novels of the same name written by Shiden Kanzaki and illustrated by Saki Ukai. In 2021 a biological agent known as the Gastrea Virus suddenly appeared and decimated most of the planet's population. After ten years of living in fear, humanity utilizes a newly discovered metal called Varanium to construct numerous monolithic structures which defend against the virus. Born into a world on the brink of collapse, Promoter Rentaro Satomi and the ten-year-old Initiator Enju Aihara of the Tendo Civil Security Agency work dangerous missions, in the hope to one day liberate humanity from the terror of the Gastrea Virus.

The anime is produced by Kinema Citrus and directed by Masayuki Kojima, with script writing by Tatsuhiko Urahata, character designs by Chiho Umishima and music by Shirō Sagisu. The series was broadcast on AT-X from April 8 to July 1, 2014, with later airings on Tokyo MX, Sun TV, KBS, tvk, TV Aichi and BS11 along with online streaming on Niconico. The series was picked up by Crunchyroll for online simulcast streaming in North America and other select parts of the world. NBCUniversal Entertainment began releasing the series in Japan on Blu-ray and DVD volumes starting on July 2, 2014. The anime was licensed by Sentai Filmworks for distribution via select digital outlets and a home media release in North America. The series was also acquired by Hanabee Entertainment for release in Australia.

Four pieces of theme music are used: an opening theme and three ending themes. The opening theme is "black bullet" by fripSide while the ending theme is "Tokohana" (トコハナ) by Nagi Yanagi. Yanagi also performs "Wasurenai tame ni" (忘れない為に) as the ending theme of the fourth episode and "Wasurenai tame ni for lotus" (忘れない為に for lotus) as the ending theme of the thirteenth episode.

== Episode list ==
No.	Official English title (Note: All English titles are taken from Hanabee Entertainment.) Original Japanese title	Original air date (Note: Black Bullet premiered in AT-X's Tuesday 22:30 (10:30 pm JST) time slot.)	Ref.
1	"The Last Hope"; Transliteration: "Saigo no Kibō" (Japanese: 最後の希望)	April 8, 2014	
Since 2021 humanity has been struggling against a parasitic biological agent known as the Gastrea Virus as it ravages the planet. In 2031 Rentaro Satomi of the Tendo Civil Security Agency investigates a Gastrea infection in the Tokyo Area and discovers a masked man who states his goal to destroy the world. Enju Aihara, a Rabbit Model Initiator, encounters the fleeing infected victim as he morphs into a giant Gastrea spider. Rentaro and Inspector Tadashima of the Tokyo Police quickly arrive on the scene, Enju makes quick work of the creature after Rentaro weakens it with his black Varanium bullets. Rentaro delivers his mission report to his superior and childhood friend Kisara Tendo and receives a severe scolding for forgetting to collect the company's payment for assisting the Tokyo Police. With the source of the recent Gastrea infection still elusive, Rentaro visits his teacher, Sumire Muroto and learns that it may be using a camouflaging ability to avoid detection. The next day after dropping Enju off at school, Rentaro reflects on humanity's war against the virus and their last hope for survival: the Cursed Children.
2	"The Mask of Madness"; Transliteration: "Kyōki no Kamen" (Japanese: 狂気の仮面)	April 15, 2014	
The Tokyo Area's top Civil Security Agencies are summoned to the Ministry of Defense at the request of the Tokyo Area's ruler, Seitenshi, who orders the Agencies to exterminate a particular Gastrea creature and retrieve a briefcase held within it. The Masked Man, Kagetane Hiruko, suddenly appears in the room and declares his intention of using the case's contents—the "Inheritance of the Seven Stars" to exterminate the Tokyo Area before killing most of the room's occupants. The next day Rentaro and Enju witness a Cursed Child from the Outer District being arrested and shot by the police, causing Enju to lament their treatment. Rentaro retrieves the child, who is still alive, and takes her to hospital. Kagetane approaches Rentaro and asks the latter to join him. Rentaro refuses and Kagetane threatens Rentaro into visiting Enju's school. The next day Rentaro rushes to Enju's school after a rumor of her being a Cursed Child is spread, forcing her to run away out of fear. While searching the Outer Districts, Rentaro stumbles upon a man called Matsuzaki taking care of Cursed Children and explains how much Enju means to him. However, Enju sorrowfully hides from Rentaro but is secretly touched by his words.
3	"The Children of Fate"; Transliteration: "Unmei no Kodomotachi" (Japanese: 運命の子供たち)	April 22, 2014	
Attempting to return to school, Enju is ridiculed by her former friends; Rentaro suggests she transfer schools. At the same time Kisara locates the source of the recent Gastrea infection and immediately dispatches the pair to its location. After Enju kills the creature and exposes the case within it, she breaks into tears because of the status quo but Rentaro promises that he will always stand by her. Rentaro tries retrieving the case but they are ambushed by Kagetane and Kohina Hiruko, a Mantis Model Initiator. Rentaro fights Kagetane but finds himself severely overpowered by the latter's Varanium powers and is mortally wounded by Kohina. Sometime later, Rentaro awakens in the hospital and Seitenshi has him participate with other civil officers to stop Kagetane from using a catalyst in the case to summon a deadly Stage Five Gastrea with the potential to destroy the Monolith barriers. As the mission gets underway, Rentaro and Enju stumble upon Shogen Ikuma's Initiator: Kayo Senju and Rentaro pleads at her humanity due to the way she follows Shogen's orders to kill without remorse. The trio then follow Shogen's intel to the bay area where the other civil officers intend to attack Kagetane.
4	"Black Bullet"; Transliteration: "Kuro no Jūdan" (Japanese: 黒の銃弾)	April 29, 2014	
Rentaro and Enju head into the bay area while Kayo stays behind to defend the area from the looming Gastrea. Discovering that all of the other civil officers had been gruesomely slaughtered, Kagetane and Kohina make a stand before the pair. Rentaro charges at Kagetane and breaks through the latter's Varanium barrier with his own Varanium prosthetic limbs. Kagetane then urges Rentaro to join him in starting another Gastrea War. However, Rentaro refuses and Kagetane shoots him in the abdomen. On the verge of death, Rentaro uses Sumire's experimental AGV drug to successfully regenerate his body and then uses his Varanium-enhanced martial arts to viciously defeat Kagetane. Afterwards a Stage Five Gastrea appears outside the Tokyo Area, and Kisara has Rentaro activate the Heaven's Ladder railgun. Unfortunately, various errors force Rentaro to sever his Varanium arm to use as a projectile and manually fire the weapon; successfully destroying the Gastrea. In the aftermath, Rentaro discovers Kayo on the verge of death after defending the area for his sake and ends her life via coup de grâce. Later, Rentaro accuses Kikunojo Tendo of being the mastermind behind Kagetane's actions. In the epilogue, Rentaro questions Seitenshi on the origins of the Gastrea however she refuses to disclose any information. Afterwards Rentaro gives Enju the results of her Gastrea corrosion examination which appear normal. Unbeknownst to Enju though, her rate of corrosion far exceeds what Rentaro told her.
5	"The Crimson Black Assassin"; Transliteration: "Beni Kuro no Ansatsusha" (Japanese: 紅黒の暗殺者)	May 6, 2014	
While Rentaro struggles to find a new school for Enju, Kisara informs him of a bodyguard job offer by Seitenshi. Rentaro later visits Seitenshi who wants him to be her bodyguard in an upcoming meeting with the Osaka Area's ruthless leader, Sogen Saitake. However the leader of Seitenshi's personal guard, Takuto Yasuwaki, grows envious of Rentaro's close position to Seitenshi and tries to intimidate Rentaro into rejecting the job; making him accept it all the more. Rentaro stumbles upon a disheveled girl named Tina Sprout wandering around the city. Unbenknownst to Rentaro, Tina turns out to be an Owl Model Initiator hired assassin. Rentaro attends the meeting between Seitenshi and Sogen and the pair learn of his tyrannical plan to turn Japan into the new world superpower after the Gastrea's eventual defeat. After the meeting Seitenshi explains to Rentaro of her ideal for the reunification of Japan and enlists him to work for her full time. Suddenly their vehicle is attacked by a sniper but Rentaro and the bodyguards manage to get Seitenshi to safety. Tina relays the failure of her mission to assassinate Seitenshi to her superior and wonders about the person who thwarted her attempt.
6	"Tragic Irony"; Transliteration: "Torajikku Aironī" (Japanese: トラジック・アイロニー)	May 13, 2014	
Early one morning, Tina asks to meet up with Rentaro. Afterwards Tina's employer informs her of Seitenshi's next meeting and names Kisara as the next target in order to remove the Tendo Security Agency from the equation. Rentaro later meets up with his sponsor, Miori Shiba who warns him about the sniper's high skill level after which he has her research Sogen as a prime suspect in the assassination attempt. Sumire later summons Rentaro and Enju and reveals more information about the New Humanity Creation Plan including the likelihood that Rentaro may find himself faced with highly ranked mechanised soldiers should he start pursuing his origins. Elsewhere, Tina appears before Kisara at the Tendo headquarters and attempts to kill her. However Rentaro arrives and stops Tina's attempt, with both shocked to see each other before Tina escapes. Afterwards, Rentaro escorts Seitenshi to another meeting and barely manages to protect her when Tina makes another assassination attempt. As Enju volunteers to go after Tina herself, Seitenshi quickly informs Rentaro about Enju's severe disadvantage due to Tina's mechanization and high 97th rank. Finally when Rentaro tries calling Enju, Tina answers her phone.
7	"The Still, Moonlit Night, the Sky at Dawn"; Transliteration: "Seijaku no Tsukiyo, Yoake no Sora" (Japanese: 静寂の月夜、夜明けの空)	May 20, 2014	
Enju's encounter with Tina leaves her severely injured and serves to dampen Rentaro's confidence of ever defeating her. Rentaro forces the gloating Takuto to set up a fake protection detail for Seitenshi to lure Tina out. Rentaro begins preparing for the upcoming face-off while Tina's employer, Ayn Rand, gives her the fake details on Seitenshi's next meeting. Tina shows up at the trap set by Rentaro and wastes no time using her combination of remote-controlled anti-materiel rifles and targeting drones to attack Rentaro. However with Miori's help, Rentaro draws Tina into close combat but gets caught off guard by a fourth drone. On the verge of defeat, Rentaro's misfired flashbang suddenly detonates and disorients Tina long enough for him to beat her. Afterwards Rentaro decides to take responsibility for Tina until a jealous Takuto ambushes the pair. He is about to murder Tina when Seitenshi shows up and promotes Rentaro to 300th rank with level five security access. Now Takuto's superior officer Rentaro shoots his trigger finger and fires him. Sometime later, Rentaro returns to the Tendo Agency's headquarters and to his surprise, finds a recovered Enju and a released Tina who Kisara hires to work for their agency.
8	"The Monument on the Border"; Transliteration: "Kyōkai sen no Sekihi" (Japanese: 境界線の石碑)	May 27, 2014	
Rentaro and Kisara decide to teach the Cursed Children in the Outer District themselves due to the tension created by the New Gastrea Law. However Seitenshi informs them of a recent Stage Four Gastrea attack on one of the Area's Varanium Monoliths and that in six days the creature's corrosive agent will dissolve the barrier and leave the Tokyo Area vulnerable to the Gastrea. Seitenshi then has Rentaro put together an adjuvant squad of civil officers for a mission to intercept the Gastrea invasion. The next day, while the tension from New Gastrea Law continues to escalate, Rentaro invites Tina to accompany him to recruit civil officers for the mission. They also encounter a blind Cursed Child begging to make ends meet and Rentaro warns her to stay out of the public for her own safety. Being the subject of envy from other civil officers, Rentaro has difficulty in recruiting and visits the Kitagari Civil Security Agency in an attempt to recruit the sibling duo, Promoter Tamaki Katagiri and Spider Model Initiator Yuzuki Katagiri. After some bargaining disagreements though, the teams decide to spar, with Rentaro and Tina emerging victorious and gaining the Katagiri's aid. Finally, the mission to repel the impending Gastrea invasion begins that night.
9	"The Guardians of the Barrier"; Transliteration: "Kekkai no Moribito" (Japanese: 結界の守人)	June 3, 2014	
During a visit to Sumire's laboratory, Tina suggests leaving the Tendo Agency since Rand's pursuit of her may endanger the others, however Rentaro stops her. Afterwards, using Rentaro's increased security privileges, Sumire shows him classified information she unearthed on the Gastrea War which was thought to have been destroyed. However data on an event at Nanahoshi Village and the Gastrea War Outbreak remain locked until they gain higher security clearance. At the same time, the Monolith's degradation finally reaches the public eye and Seitenshi calls a press conference to appease the public's unrest. Rentaro and Enju later try looking for more squad members at the adjuvant encampment and discover a suspiciously murdered Promoter. Rentaro then reunites with, and recruits his longtime friend, Promoter Shoma Nagisawa and Cat Model Initiator, Midori Fuse. Kisara later shows up and along with Tina, also join Rentaro's squad much to the latter's protest. Afterwards, Commander Nagamasa Gado rallies the camp and explains their strategy to support the JASDF. However, Rentaro upsets Nagamasa when he questions the plan and trust of the JASDF. Finally, Rentaro and his newly formed squad prepare themselves for the upcoming battle to defend the Tokyo Area.
10	"The Battle for Tokyo Area"; Transliteration: "Tōkyō Eria Bōei Sen" (Japanese: 東京エリア防衛戦)	June 10, 2014	
With three days to go before Monolith 32's collapse, Rentaro and Kisara continue tutoring Matsuzaki's Cursed Children, taking them to visit the Flames of Revolution memorial site where they show their affection for Rentaro. Later that night, Rentaro and Kisara investigate the crumbling Monolith 32 and ponder on why it was specifically targeted by the Aldebaran Gastrea, with Kisara deciding to conduct further research on it. The next day the Tokyo Area's population begins evacuating into underground shelters via lottery, and the remaining public's tension against the Cursed Children only escalates further, forcing Rentaro to rescue the blind Cursed Child from an angry mob. Back at the camp, Kisara and Rentaro are left in shock after learning that Monolith 32 was privately commissioned by Kazumitsu Tendo. The next day, Rentaro and Enju horrifically discover that some of the other Cursed Children had been killed when a bomb was deliberately dropped on the school. This sends Rentaro into a depression and he vents his frustration on Kisara by arguing against the corrupt strata of their society. Suddenly, the winds knock Monolith 32 to the ground a day early, leaving everyone with no time for grief due to the imminent Gastrea invasion.
11	"The Heart of Taurus, the Lance of Light"; Transliteration: "Taurusu no Shinzō, Hikari no Yari" (Japanese: タウルスの心臓、光の槍)	June 17, 2014	
Following the Monolith's collapse, the civil officers look on in terror as the JASDF are overwhelmed by the Gastrea swarm heading their way. At the same time, Rentaro's adjuvant break their rank to neutralize a detachment of Gastrea in the woods. Upon returning to the battlefield, Hidehiko Gado maniacally informs them of a mysterious "Lance of Light" (Note: This is the official translation by Hanabee Entertainment.) which devastates the remaining civil officers. In the aftermath, Kisara informs Rentaro of the mercury poisoning shown by the wounded alongside Tina's intel of a massive Stage Four Gastrea to be responsible. Afterwards, Nagamasa summons Rentaro and fills him in on the Aldebaran's regenerative abilities as well as the Pleiades Gastrea responsible for the "Lance of Light". Nagamasa then deems the Pleiades to be equally as threatening and forces Rentaro into a suicide mission to destroy it as punishment for breaking ranks in the earlier battle. Heading out on the mission that night, Rentaro suddenly gets ambushed by a Gastrea pack. Shockingly, he finds himself saved by Kagetane and Kohina themselves. Afterwards, Kagetane once again tries and fails in recruiting Rentaro. Despite this, Kagetane points Rentaro in the Pleiades' direction the next day and the unlikely trio sets off.
12	"Crisis Point"; Transliteration: "Kuraishisu Pointo" (Japanese: クライシス・ポイント)	June 24, 2014	
After spotting the Pleiades Gastrea, Rentaro and Kagetane attack and destroy it. Pleiades' demise sends the Aldebaran into a frenzied attack on the civil officer encampment which claims Nagamasa's life. This instantly promotes Rentaro to commanding status due to being the next highly ranking officer. Kagetane and Kohina later boldly stride into the encampment and find themselves accused of the previous Promoter's murder, with Rentaro defending them. Rentaro later visits Midori after her fatal Gastrea encounter, prompting her to run off and commit suicide to not burden the rest of the adjuvant. In pain at Midori's death, Shoma has Rentaro swear to defeat the Aldebaran and the latter uses his new authority to assert an authoritarianist command over the remaining civil officers while Shoma pairs up with Nagamasa's Initiator, Asaka Mibu. At that moment, Miori arrives at Rentaro's request and proposes a bomb capable of destroying the Aldebaran from the inside. Finally, as nightfall approaches, the civil officers aided by Shiba Heavy Weapons prepare to face Aldebaran at the Flames of Revolution. Unbeknownst to them though, Takuto attempts to sabotage the operation by disposing of the batteries for the spotlights needed to locate the Gastrea.
13	"They Who Would Be Gods"; Transliteration: "Kami o Mezashita Mono Tachi" (Japanese: 神を目指した者たち)	July 1, 2014	
Despite the batteries failing to arrive, Rentaro begins the attack on the swarm of incoming Gastrea by using the light from the thousands of paper lanterns released by Seitenshi due to the Genan Festival. With help from their comrades, Rentaro and Enju manage to locate and plant the bomb inside the Aldebaran. However the bomb fails to explode and Rentaro opts to sacrifice himself to detonate it. However Shoma steps in instead and attacks the Aldebaran using his reverse Tendo style thus detonating the bomb at the cost of his life. The next day, in the aftermath of the Third Kanto Battle, Enju relays their victory to Rentaro while reconstruction of Monolith 32 commences. Sometime later, Kisara summons Kasumitsu and hands over the evidence she obtained linking him to the corruption behind Monolith 32, in exchange for a duel to the death. Kisara mercilessly uses her special Tendo style to sever Kasumitsu's leg, forcing him to confess the plot to kill their parents ten years ago, after which he grotesquely succumbs to his injuries. But that first attack finally killed Kasumitsu, splitting him in half. Kisara's method of revenge angers and disappoints Rentaro, but the former berates him for not having the will to see justice through, no matter how "evil" it may seem — leaving Rentaro to say that he may become her enemy someday. In the epilogue, Seitenshi receives approval from the public to implement the New Gastrea Law which she hopes will save the Cursed Children. Meanwhile, Enju begins pondering about the deaths of their comrades, prompting Rentaro to burst into tears for fear of becoming desensitized by death and at the thought of losing her. With peace returning to the Tokyo Area, Enju tearfully embraces Rentaro and promises that she will always remain at his side.

== Home media ==
NBCUniversal Entertainment began releasing the series in Japan on Blu-ray and DVD volumes starting on July 2, 2014. Sentai Filmworks released the series in Region 1 on Blu-ray and DVD format on October 27, 2015.

NBCUniversal Entertainment (Region 2 - Japan)
Vol.	Episodes	Blu-ray / DVD artwork	Release date	Ref.
1	1, 2	Rentaro Satomi & Enju Aihara	July 2, 2014	
2	3, 4	Kagetane Hiruko & Kohina Hiruko	August 6, 2014	
3	5, 6	Kisara Tendo & Tina Sprout	September 3, 2014	
4	7	Tina & Enju	October 8, 2014	
5	8, 9	Tamaki Katagiri & Yuzuki Katagiri	November 5, 2014	
6	10, 11	Shoma Nagisawa & Midori Fuse	December 3, 2014	
7	12, 13	Enju & Rentaro	January 7, 2015	

Sentai Filmworks (Region 1 - North America)
Vol.	Episodes	Blu-ray / DVD artwork	BD / DVD Release date	BD Ref.	DVD Ref.
1	1–13	Rentaro Satomi & Enju Aihara	September 27, 2015		
