= List of Dance in the Vampire Bund episodes =

Dance in the Vampire Bund is an anime series adapted from the manga of the same title by Nozomu Tamaki. Produced by Shaft and directed by Akiyuki Shinbo, Dance in the Vampire Bund began broadcasting in Japan on AT-X between January 7 to April 1, 2010. Hiroyuki Yoshino wrote the series composition, Akio Dobashi composed the series music, and Naoyuki Konno designed the characters. Konno served as chief animation director for the series, and was joined by Yasutoshi Iwasaki and Fumio Matsumoto for the final episode. Although produced by Shaft, the series was practically a co-production with A.C.G.T. (Note: A.C.G.T is given the Animation Assistance (アニメーション協力) credit across all of the episodes. Furthermore, although Shaft president Mitsutoshi Kubota is credited as the sole animation producer, A.C.G.T co-founder Takeshi Baba acted as a line producer as well.) Episodes 5, 7–8, and 10 were outsourced to Studio Pastoral. (Note: Studio Pastoral credited as Production Assistance (制作協力) on their respective episodes.)

In March 2010, Funimation licensed the series for an English-language release in North America.

== Episode list ==
No.	Title	Directed by (Note: Information is taken from the ending credits of each episode.)	Written by	Storyboarded by	Original release date
1	"Prom Night"; Transliteration: "Puromu Naito" (Japanese: プロムナイト)	Naoyuki Tatsuwa	Hiroyuki Yoshino	Meimu	January 7, 2010
A lot of deaths have occurred recently, and a survivor claims the attacker a vampire. On a game show, five contestants are asked if they believe in the existence of vampires. Three of the contestants say they do not believe and the other two think otherwise. One of the two believers is a fashion model named Yumi and the other is a heartthrob vampire actor named Seiichi Hirai. The two have an argument with the other three contestants on the existence of said creatures. A young girl in the audience from Romania enters the argument. It is then revealed by a mystery caller that the girl who survived the vampire attack was saved by one of her "agents". When asked why her people got involved, she says they were ordered to by the vampire princess. A servant of the princess by the name of Veratos is introduced onto the show. One of the opposing contestants, Isao Ebikawa, believes she is an actress and outright states this. Veratos then reveals the arm of a vampire in a case. Seiichi is then revealed to be the vampire attacking people and it is also revealed that the in-cased arm is his. After biting into Yumi's neck and sucking out her blood, he transforms into his "true form" which resembles a giant bipdeal chameleon. He then escapes from the show set to the roof. There, the actual vampire princess is revealed to be the young girl in the audience who entered the argument. She then confronts the monster and kills him with great ease. The princess reveals her name as Mina Tepeş. Mina states that she will be using Tokyo Landfill #0 as the new kingdom of the vampires and states it will be called the Vampire Bund.
2	"Howling"; Transliteration: "Hauringu" (Japanese: ハウリング)	Masahiro Sonoda	Hiroyuki Yoshino	Masahiro Sonoda	January 14, 2010
Akira Kaburagi Regendorf excuses himself from class when the subject of vampires was stirred up, feeling uneasy about it. Yuki Saegusa catches up to him to bring him a boxed lunch, but she is soon called in by Nanami Shinonome to discuss about the student council financial report. Ryohei Kuze tries to encourage Akira to make a move on Yuki, but to no avail. Akira later notices a girl who covertly observes him. He instantly sees a series of past memories of her when he touches her, causing him a major headache. The girl runs off when Yuki arrives, who tells him to see a doctor. Akira later encounters the girl in front of a billboard, introducing herself as Mina, the vampire princess. A military helicopter fire missiles toward Mina, but Akira manages to duck and cover her from the sudden attack. Mina then asks Akira to apply shade gel on her, which is to prevent her from deteriorating due to sunlight, in which she eventually coerces him into attending to her. Two assassins disguised as police charged at Mina and Akira, yet they are easily defeated in the end. On the top of a large tower, Akira reveals that he has amnesia due to a head injury he suffered a year ago. Immediately after, a spider vampire named Tsuchigumo attacks Mina and Akira. When Tsuchigumo flings Akira to the ground, Mina cries out his name, triggering a memories where he promised to always protect Mina when they were younger. Akira rediscovers his heritage as a werewolf of the Earth Clan. As he makes his way to the top of the tower, he slaughters Tsuchigumo and rescues Mina.
3	"Teen Wolf"; Transliteration: "Tīn Urufu" (Japanese: ティーン ウルフ)	Naoyuki Tatsuwa; Hiroshi Kimura	Hiroyuki Yoshino	Masahiro Sonoda	January 21, 2010
Waking up in Mina's bedroom, he realizes that last night's happenings was not a dream. He is also aware that all of his memories have returned. Mina is now a transfer student at Akira's academy, however everyone is shocked to see that Mina and Akira share a master and servant relationship. Akira runs off to get away from all the commotion. He receives a text message to meet up with Mina soon. Yuki manages to find him, questioning about his association with Mina and his restoration of his memories. The student council finds out that Mina is the actually founder and chairwoman of the academy, much to Nanami's chagrin. Akira appears in the office, not noticing that he left behind his cellphone until later. Nanami wagers the capture of Akira for the expulsion of Mina, inviting all the students to participate. Meanwhile, Mina and Veratos are having a business meeting with various politician representatives regarding the ratification of the Special Zone Establishment Bill submitted by Isurugi. In their presentation, it is displayed that the government has increased in debts and decreased in bonds over time. It is also noted that the vampire corporation has earned more income than the other represented corporations. Just when the student council has Akira cornered, Mei Ren shoots a hard candy as a bullet into a window, which then distracts the student council and allows Akira to escape. Mei Ren leaves her contact information on his cellphone, giving it back to him. Back at Mina's estate, Akira jokes that he had forgotten about his childhood promise to always protect Mina. Elsewhere, Nanami is seen being engulfed by a horde of zombie vampires.
4	"Interview with Vampire"; Transliteration: "Intabyū Wizu Vanpaia" (Japanese: インタビュー ウィズ ヴァンパイア)	Nobuharu Kamanaka	Hiroyuki Yoshino	Nobuharu Kamanaka	January 28, 2010
Mina is planning to hold a worldwide press conference, as all members are thoroughly tested to be humans for security measures. She is greeted by Juneau Dermailles, who insults the reputation of both Akira and Veratos as savage guard dogs, frustrating the two as they leave. Akira and Veratos later go on top of a large tower, where they converse about their loyalty toward Mina. Veratos goes on to say that the vampire race will cease to exist if the death of the princess were to occur. Dermailles reports that one of his newly recruited agents has gone missing and a deadly bomb has recently been stolen. While Mina holds her press conference, Akira and Veratos try to search for the bomb. During the press conference, Mina mentions that the vampire corporation has given support to the government and economy. She further voices that the vampire corporation would withdraw its support if the Special Zone Establishment Bill was declined. Akira and Veratos find out that a reporter named Nicole Edelman has the scent of shade gel, confirming the identity of a vampire. Nicole is not only responsible for killing Dermailles' agent, but has also removed some of her internal organs to stitch the bomb into her body. Just when Nicole attempts to attack Mina, Akira restrains her and Veratos stabs her in the chest, which incinerates her body. The bomb, however, has already been activated. Unable to disarm it, Akira throws the bomb into a disabled elevator shaft, causing a small explosion. The bill is eventually considered, as the entire city had witnessed the turnout of the press conference, whether they believed it or not.
5	"Shadow of Vampire"; Transliteration: "Shadō Obu Vanpaia" (Japanese: シャドウ オブ ヴァンパイア)	Yoshihiro Mori	Hiroyuki Yoshino	Kouhei Hatano	February 4, 2010
The students of the academy still seem to be awestruck that Mina is a vampire princess and Akira is her servant. Yuki volunteers to assist an unskilled Mina in the nutrition class, even though the latter claims to be well educated in various cooking utensils. When the two present Akira with their culinary creation, they are interrupted by a television broadcast reports that the prime minister Katsuichi Mizoguchi is against the Special Zone Establishment Bill and wants to dissolve the assembly. Yuki later notices that Mina is wearing the ring she gave to Akira as a gift, however Mina blatantly remarks that the sole purpose of Akira is to serve and protect her, despite what his relationship was with Yuki. Ryohei shows Akira photos confirming the rumors about Nanami being attacked by vampires, suspecting Mina to be the culprit. Come nightfall, after Akira thanks Yuki for helping Mina prepare the meal for him, they are suddenly ambushed by zombie vampires, surprisingly wearing the same school uniform as them. Meanwhile, Mina goes to see Mizoguchi, trying to convince him to back down from his opposition toward the Special Zone Establishment Bill, but to no luck. During a downpour, while Akira is brutally beaten by the zombie vampires, Mei Ren steps in at the last moment and takes on the band with ease. Akira and Yuki escape into a warehouse to dry their clothes. While Akira says that his memories returned after seeing Mina, Yuki admits that she saw the two when they were first attacked. It is revealed that Mina sent Nella to kidnap Shinya Mizoguchi, the prime minister's grandson, after he refused to reason with Mina.
6	"From Dusk Till Dawn"; Transliteration: "Furomu Dasuku Tiru Dōn" (Japanese: フロム ダスク ティル ドーン)	Nobuharu Kamanaka	Hiroyuki Yoshino	Nobuharu Kamanaka	February 11, 2010
Mei Ren confronts Akira by explaining that Mina orchestrated the recent attacks targeting her to persuade him to be her only protector, causing Akira to start doubting and distrusting Mina after pondering about what Mei Ren said. He then finds out that Mina has Shinya in custody, in exchange for the mastermind controlling the prevention of the bill. At the academy, Hikosaka, who is tired of being bullied, is revealed to have vampire teeth marks in his neck, as he makes his way toward Yuki. Akira comes in the nick of time and knock out one of Hikosaka's fangs with his elbow. However, Hikosaka runs away before Akira had the chance of learning who had turned him into a vampire. Akira confronts her about the kidnapping of the prime minister's grandson and the infiltration of the vampires into the school; Mina is responsible for only the abduction (a non-violent, but effective method), while another is responsible for the vampire infiltration and conversion of the school. A television broadcast informs that Mizoguchi has announced his early retirement as prime minister, in which the bill may be passed after all. Akira later gathers the student council inside the chapel, constructing a scheme to eradicate the vampires from within the school. Before Akira leaves to bring back weapons for the student council, Yuki asks about the ring she gave to him. Though he said that he had lost it, he still values his relationship with her. As The student council is confined inside the chapel for the night, they hear Nanami's voice behind the front door. Yuki, who tries to tell the other members not to open the door, is now distressed to see Nanami turned into a vampire.
7	"Innocent Blood"; Transliteration: "Inosento Buraddo" (Japanese: イノセント ブラッド)	Yoshihiro Mori; Hiroshi Kimura	Hiroyuki Yoshino	Yuuichi Nakazawa	February 18, 2010
On his way back to the chapel with a stash of weapon, Akira is stopped by Alphonse Medici Borgiani, who says that he suggested the kidnapping to have the bill passed. Akira's father, Wolfgang Regendorf, mentions about his choice of killing Akira when he had amnesia. Both of them tells Akira that he must be willing to risk his life for the sake of the princess to rescue the student council. Mina appears in the chapel when Nanami attempts to bite Yuki. Regendorf and Alphonse explain that all the attacks that happened so far were to lured out the conspirators against the vampire society, which is a terrorist organization called Telomere. Mina is disappointed that Jean Marais Dermailles had turned many of the students into vampires as well as had manipulated Mizoguchi to dissolve the assembly, slashing a sword through his face as punishment. She did not want to conquer the world, instead she wanted to be a part of it. Mina severs Jean's arm when he transformed, but Jean's human ally Takashi Saijo distracts Mina, allowing Jean to grab hold of her. When Saijo charges in with his sword, Yuki steps in front of Mina. Akira crashes into the building and deflects Saito. He then tears out Jean's heart, causing him to vanish. Veratos arrives to the chapel with troops to treat all the victims. Mina and Akira challenge each other to a duel to the death, as they both transform into their true forms. As the fight causes the chapel to crumble into ruins, Akira sacrifices himself to save Mina from a falling crucifix. Akira, wounded but still alive, still promises to serve and protect Mina no matter the circumstance. The Special Zone Establishment Bill is finally passed, and Akira is knighted by Mina and takes his place among the greatest warriors.
Special	"Special Episode"	-	-	-	February 25, 2010
A compilation episode with some new scenes.
8	"Near Dark"; Transliteration: "Nia Dāku" (Japanese: ニア ダーク)	Naoyuki Tatsuwa	Masahiro Yokotani	Naoyuki Tatsuwa	March 4, 2010
On the surface, things appear to have calmed down at the academy, but among the students there are deep physical and psychological scars that have not yet healed. Yuki comes into the office to show her draft of the student council officer invitation, observing Mina's two-sided personality as both selfless and selfish. Meanwhile, Mei Ren pulls Akira over her onto the floor of a classroom, where the latter sees her wearing a replicated necklace, as the original belongs to someone special to her. After Yuki scurries to the classroom to pick up her notebook, she returns into the office, only to find that Mina is reading her diary. Though Mina apologizes for reading it, she is quite intrigued for what Yuki wrote. Mina also apologizes for lying about the ring Yuki gave to Akira, admitting her envy toward Yuki. Elsewhere, Veratos saves a young boy named Yuzuru from a rogue vampire who self-destructs and learns that Yuzuru is searching for Nanami inside the Vampire Bund. Mina and Akira later find Nanami and proceed to chase after her. Stopping in a forest, Akira and Mina are introduced to Hysterica who quickly surrounds them with her vampire minions. Nanami escapes after preventing Mina from attacking Hysterica, however Veratos shows up and engages in a battle against Hysterica with the two speaking of their past. Yuzuru sneaks away from Yuki to find Nanami who is overwhelmed by her feelings for him and pleading to Mina for her death. Hysterica suddenly bashes Yuzuru aside and takes Nanami making her escape leaving Mina, Akira, and Veratos to wonder what she is planning to do to the human race.
9	"Lost Boy"; Transliteration: "Rosuto Bōi" (Japanese: ロストボーイ)	Hiroshi Kimura	Masahiro Yokotani	Tomohiro Kawahara	March 11, 2010
It is explained that a capsules, called Agni's Blood, are implanted in Hysterica's vampire army, causing them to self-destruct via cellphone signal to carry out suicide bombings, which make take place in the underground subway stations. Veratos tells Yuzuru that she chose to become a vampire to serve under Queen Lucretia, Mina's mother. Mina and Hysterica met on top of a tall building to negotiate. Hysterica is caught off guard when Veratos sets off a detonator, causing the building to collapse. While falling, Hysterica loses hold of her cellphone, and Mina tries to obtain it, but fails to do so. Once underground, Mina reveals that the station is surrounded by aluminum foil and signal cancellation devices to prevent the any large-scale suicide bombings. A desperate Hysterica orders a weakened Nanami to head to the roof of the building to initiate the cellphone signal to proceed with the plan. Yuzuru comes to stop Nanami, knowing of her obsessive feelings for him, as he stabs her with a knife. Akira finds a depressed Hikosaka aboard a subway train with a cellphone. The train explodes when Hikosaka decides to commit suicide, as Akira mourns for his death. When Hysterica tries to kill Nanami and Yuzuru by breaking the bridge above, Mina transforms and saves the two from plunging to the ground below. Hysterica then realizes that the knife that was stabbed into Nanami is actually an extract of Mina's blood, making her the new master. Nanami pierces Hyseterica's chest with the knife and Veratos ejects Agni's blood into it, igniting Hysterica. Though Nanami is asked to work for Mina, Yuzuru opts to become a vampire to stay by Nanami's side.
10	"Walpurgis Night"; Transliteration: "Warupurugisu no Yoru" (Japanese: ワルプルギスの夜)	Yoshihiro Mori	Hiroyuki Yoshino	Yuuichi Tanaka	March 18, 2010
While Mina, Yuki, Veratos, Nanami, and Yuzuru enjoy a day in the indoor pool at the estate, Akira secretly spends the day with a flirtatious Mei Ren. Later on, they walk through a garden where Akira notices cleomes, which only bloom at night. Mei Ren tells of a tragic story about a butterfly that was in love with a cleome until its death. The message of this story entails that a butterfly will never be able to bond with a flower. Veratos abruptly receives a call that three ships are approaching the Vampire Bund. Mei Ren states that the reason for her time with Akira was to assess of his memory, recently-restored and currently-lost. Mina tells Yuki not to tell Akira about the Three Clans, but Yuki notifies him anyway. The Three Clans, led by Rozenmann, Ivanovic, and Li, visit the Vampire Bund, questioning her nobility status. She is forced to marry within her lineage to produce an heir to the throne. The leaders of the Three Clans send assassins after Akira, putting his life in grave peril. The wager is to see if whichever assassin can successfully kill Akira by daybreak, then their respective leader will be chosen to be the husband-to-be. Mina is told that Akira is that of a different lineage and life span, making him unsuitable to marry.
11	"Underworld"; Transliteration: "Andāwārudo" (Japanese: アンダーワールド)	Nobuharu Kamanaka	Hiroyuki Yoshino	Tomoki Kobayashi	March 25, 2010
Mina must undergo an unpleasant purity inquiry, one that tests to see if she can produce an heir to the throne or not. Meanwhile, Alphonse takes Akira away from the assassins and clarifies the situation Mina is dealing with. Alphonse says that Lucretia died in the hands of the Three Clans, and that Mina is now used as a vessel of the Three Clans. Akira sees Alphonse off as he prepares to battle for his life. Alphonse goes to Mina to tell her that Akira is determine to defeat all the assassins and that he wants her to stay strong for him. From this, Mina raises the stakes of her wager with the leaders of the Three Clans, offering her life as collateral. If none of the assassins can kill Akira, then Mina is freed from their bet. Akira is up against an assassin with tentacled arms, who queries if he had seen the legacy of the true blood lineage. The werewolf puts his life in jeopardy, much to his inability to transform at this time. Mei Ren luckily arrives and rescues him, revealing her true form in the process. After giving him a sedative via mouth-to-mouth, Mei Ren confesses her love for Akira, saying that they belong together. The same assassin reappears and casts Akira, along with herself, into a deep pit. Changing into Yuki's appearance, the assassin asks him about the true blood legacy again, cutting through his chest with her arm, rendering him momentarily unconscious. When he wakes up, he sees Mina's appearance, asking him a third time about the true blood legacy. An enraged Akira transforms into a werewolf and murders the assassin in anguish.
12	"Dance in the Vampire Bund"; Transliteration: "Dansu in za Vanpaia Bando" (Japanese: ダンス イン ザ ヴァンパイアバンド)	Kouhei Hatano	Hiroyuki Yoshino	Kouhei Hatano	April 1, 2010
Akira is treated in a facility beneath the Vampire Bund established by the fang-less vampires. Akira finds out that he could not transform before because Mei Ren forced him to swallow a hard candy that prevents transformation temporarily. He also realizes that Mei Ren works for Telomere. Akira has recovered all of his memories, including that of true blood legacy. Regendorf and Alphonse tell Mina of shocking secret behind the true blood legacy as well. Two princesses were found in an underground castle years ago, and only one of them can carry on the true blood lineage, either vampires or beasts. The two beastly warriors shed blood in defense of identical princesses. Akira is brutally wounded by an attack from the werecat Mei Ren. However, he does not give up and he uses his last bit of strength to defeat Mei Ren. Mina wins the gamble, and the leaders of the Three Clans eventually swear oath to Mina. Soon after, Mina and Akira reunite in the estate, and Mina later makes a pledge to stay by Akira's side forever until the very end.
