= BS10 Premium =

Japanese premium TV channel

- Type: Pay television network
- Country: Japan
- Headquarters: Tokyo, Japan

Programming
- Languages: Japanese; English

Ownership
- Owner: Japanet Broadcasting Co., Ltd.

History
- Launched: July 1, 1986
- Former names: Star Channel (1986-2025); BS10 Star Channel (2025)

Links
- Website: bs10.jp/premium/

BS10 Premium is a Japanese premium television channel operated by Japanet Broadcasting. BS10 Premium mainly provides films and television series made outside Japan and is available on satellite, cable and IPTV platforms. As of 2024, the channel is currently owned by Japanet Broadcasting.

== History ==
Star Channel was founded as a private company in 1986.

Star Channel began 24-hour broadcasting using Japanese communication satellites in July 1992.

As of 1992, the owners of Star Channel were United International Pictures's subscription television arm, UIP Pay TV, and a local distributor specializing in Western movies.

Previously, each 25% of the company's stake were owned by Itochu, 21st Century Fox (previously as the original News Corporation), Sony Pictures and Tohokushinsha Film, but as of 2018, 21st Century Fox sold its share in the company to Tohokushinsha. Sony Pictures later divested the company in 2019.

On June 1, 2024, all shares held by Tohokushinsha Film transferred to Japanet Broadcasting, and Star Channel became as a wholly owned subsidiary of Japanet Broadcasting. On August 1, 2024, Star Channel merged with Japanet Broadcasting.
