= List of Tytania episodes =

The following is the list of episodes for the Japanese Anime series Tytania. The anime series is produced by Artland and sound productions by Magic Capsule. The episodes are directed by Noboru Ishiguro based on the original novel created by Yoshiki Tanaka. The characters from the anime are designed by Noboru Sugimitsu based on the original character designs by Haruhiko Mikimoto. The series began airing on Japan's NHK broadcasting station on 9 October 2008. Two pieces of theme music are used, one opening and one ending theme. The opening theme is titled "Ano Sora wo, Ike" sung by Ken Nishikiori and performed by the Kanagawa Philharmonic Orchestra while the ending theme is titled "Lost in Space" sung and performed by Psychic Lover.

== Episode list ==
No.	Title	Original release date
1	"Battle of Cerberus"; Transliteration: "Keruberosu no tatakai" (Japanese: ケルベロスの戦い)	October 9, 2008
The battle of Cerberus, in which Tytania fights against Euria with Ariabart Tytania and Fan Hyulick commanding respectively.
2	"The Four Dukes of Uraniborg"; Transliteration: "Uraniborugu no yon kōshaku" (Japanese: 天の城(ウラニボルグ)の四公爵)	October 16, 2008
While Fan Hyulick flees Euria after learning that he wasn't meant to win the battle of Cerberus, each of the dukes interpret Ariabart's defeat. Tytania begins to hunt Fan down.
3	"Requirements of a Hero"; Transliteration: "Eiyū no jōken" (Japanese: 英雄の条件)	October 23, 2008
Fan Hyulick arrives in Emmental, and is taken by Tytania forces to Alses Tytania, who offers him a position within Tytania. Fan accepts, but Lira rescues him from Alses's mansion, hoping he will join their resistance force and defeat Tytania.
4	"Lira's Determination"; Transliteration: "Rira no kesshin" (Japanese: リラの決心)	October 30, 2008
Lira tries to seduce Fan so that he joins her resistance force, but is interrupted by Tytania forces who were informed of Fan's whereabouts by Lira's grandmother. Lira refuses to give in and helps Fan to escape, where he meets Miranda Casmier and joins her forces on a ship named "The Honest Old Man".
5	"Admiration and Pride and..." Transliteration: "Akogare to, hokori to" (Japanese: 憧れと, 誇りと)	November 6, 2008
After the battle of Cerberus, Tytania is clearly not invincible like it appeared, so Turandia officials decide to rebel. Jouslain arrives in Turandia to resolve the issue before a battle broke out, but fails and after he leaves the Turandia princess is shot.
6	"Battle of Syracuse System"; Transliteration: "Shirakusa Seiiki kaisen" (Japanese: シラクサ星域会戦)	November 13, 2008
Turandia, unable to gather allies, rebels against Tytania alone. To make up for his loss in the battle of Cerberus, Ariabart commands and after a short battle squashes Turandia.
7	"Under the Blaze Flag"; Transliteration: "Ryūsei no hata no moto ni" (Japanese: 流星の旗のもとに)	November 20, 2008
Fan and Miranda's group visit another resistive force, and watch them take over a Tytania fortress as part of a plan to defeat Tytania.
8	"Two Encounters"; Transliteration: "Futatsu no deai" (Japanese: ふたつの出会い)	November 27, 2008
Zarlisch defeats the resistive force that took over the Tytanian fortress, and Elbing is forced to give Tytania their mines to prove their loyalty. The Elbing princess, Lydia, realises that this would be a disaster for her country, and instead sacrifices herself as a hostage of Tytania.
9	"Small Wind"; Transliteration: "Chiisana kaze" (Japanese: 小さな風)	December 4, 2008
Lydia goes on an adventure around the Tytania mansion in order to talk to Ajman Tytania about her becoming a hostage to prove Elbing's loyalty, but in the end Jouslain passes on the message.
10	"Collapse of Euria"; Transliteration: "Euriya hōkai" (Japanese: エウリヤ崩壊)	December 11, 2008
Euria collapses after an attempted rebellion, and Lira is kidnapped by Alses Tytania, after being betrayed by one of her comrades, to lure Fan out and capture him.
11	"Hyulick's Determination"; Transliteration: "Hyūrikku no ketsui" (Japanese: ヒューリックの決意)	December 18, 2008
After learning of Lira's capture, Fan makes preparations to save her.
12	"The Infiltration of Emmental"; Transliteration: "Ēmentāru sennyū" (Japanese: エーメンタール潜入)	December 25, 2008
Fan Hyulick goes to Alses Tytania's mansion to rescue Lira Florenz, but Alses stops him from completing his mission. In order for Fan to escape, Lira attacks Alses, but dies in the process.
13	"The End and the Beginning"; Transliteration: "Owari to hajimari" (Japanese: 終わりと始まり)	January 8, 2009
Alses tries to escape from Emmental, but before he reaches the safety of Idris' fleet, Fan Hyulick attacks his ship, killing Alses.
14	"Storming the Ryutehhi"; Transliteration: "Ryutehhi no dōran" (Japanese: リュテッヒの動乱)	January 15, 2009
Marquis Estrades Tytania attempted a coup on Vardhana but it was crushed and he was killed accidentally by his son. Fan Hyulick, an enemy of Tytania went into hiding on the planet Casabianca.
15	"Like A Grain Of Wheat"; Transliteration: "Hito tsubu no mugi no gotoku" (Japanese: 一粒の麦のごとく)	January 22, 2009
Tytania are hot on the heels of Fan Hyulick and managed to track him down to the planet Casabianca, but he managed to evade capture with the help of Karan and her uncle and auntie and successfully escaped from Casabianca.
16	"Imminent Counterattack"; Transliteration: "Hangeki no noroshi" (Japanese: 反撃の烽火)	January 29, 2009
Fan Hyulick joined up with the crew of Honest Old Man on the planet Estahl and hatched a plan to collect the 2,500,000 bounty on him to raise funds for their plan against Tytania.
17	"Overpriced Ransom"; Transliteration: "Takasugita minoshirokin" (Japanese: 高すぎた身代金)	February 12, 2009
Fan's plan for the crew to rescue him failed and he was recaptured by the Estahl government. Miranda managed to take revenge on Kyle, the captain who took the voice of her husband.
18	"Prison Satellite Chronos"; Transliteration: "Kangoku eisei Kuronosu" (Japanese: 監獄衛星クロノス)	February 19, 2009
Refusing to handover Fan Hyulick to Lord Zarlish without an official extradition request from the Clan Lord, Estahl president Elbert Kanack send Fan to Prison Satellite Chronos. The crew devised a plan to break Fan out of prison as Zarlish uses a show of force to get the Estahl government to handover Fan.
19	"The Radmose Case"; Transliteration: "Radomōzu jiken" (Japanese: ラドモーズ事件)	March 5, 2009
After being appointed the new Minister of War, Lord Idris appointed his younger brother, Baron Radmorz Tytania as the new Commander of Imperial Guard. Radmorz attacked Lydia and insulted Bal'ami's father which prompted Bal'ami to punch him. Rasmorz's appointment was revoked and Bal'ami was relieved of his current appointment and send to the planet Luttich.
20	"Chronos Assault"; Transliteration: "Kuronosu kyōshū" (Japanese: クロノス強襲)	March 5, 2009
The crew faked Fan Hyulick's death and engineered a riot on Chronos to rescue him. Lord Zarlish launched an attack on Estahl after learning of Fan's death.
21	"Chance Meeting on Esthar"; Transliteration: "Esutāru no kaikō" (Japanese: エスタールの邂逅)	March 12, 2009
In an attempt to stop Lord Jouslain from assuming the mission of retrieving the Fan's body from Estahl, Lord Idris attempt to assassinate Bal'ami but failed. As the blockade over Estahl was lifted, the Honest Old Man made an attempt to escape but was blocked by Jouslain's fleet and chased by Estahl's fleet. Lord Jouslain allowed the Honest Old Man to escape.
22	"Prelude of Ambition"; Transliteration: "Yabō no pureryūdo" (Japanese: 野望のプレリュード)	March 12, 2009
From the fallout of Fan's escape, the Clan Lord did not punish Lord Jouslain and Lord Idris reminiscence on his motivation and ambition to be the Clan Lord one day.
23	"Desert Rat"; Transliteration: "Sabaku no nezumi" (Japanese: 砂漠の鼠)	March 19, 2009
Fan and the Honest Old Man escape to the remote planet Valgasyu with Lord Zarlish hot on his heel. An auxiliary ship pick up his trail in the desert where Fan met up with an anti-Tytania force. An attempt was made by the ship to capture Fan but it failed and engaged in battle with the Honest Old Man.
24	"Honest Old Man"; Transliteration: "Onesuto ōrudo man" (Japanese: オネストオールドマン)	March 19, 2009
Dr Lee arrived to destroy Tytania's ship but the Honest Old Man was damaged in the battle and crash landed. the Lord Zarlish's fleet arrives and ignored the Valgasyu's protest in his single-minded pursuit of Fan. Meanwhile Lord Jouslain's fleet hurried to Valgasyu.
25	"Fierce Fighting on Hot Sand"; Transliteration: "Nessa no gekitō" (Japanese: 熱砂の激闘)	March 26, 2009
The Valgasyu army request for Lord Zarlish to leave the planet was ignored and both side engaged in battle. Fan uses the guns of the crashed Honest Old Man to shoot at the Typhoon (Zarlish flagship) and managed to sink it, which allow the Valgasyu army to gain the upper hand in the battle. Zarlish proceeded to pursue Fan in the caves and the two men stand off.
26	"End of the Song of the Souls' Repose (Requiem)"; Transliteration: "Shūmaku no rekuiemu" (Japanese: 終幕の鎮魂歌(レクイエム))	March 26, 2009
Lord Zarlish was killed in the cave and Lord Jouslain claimed his body from the rebel. He was given a lavish funeral.
