= List of Aikatsu Friends! episodes =

Aikatsu Friends! is a Japanese anime television series produced by BN Pictures, and the successor to both the Aikatsu Stars! series and the original Aikatsu! anime series based on Bandai's Data Carddass arcade machines. The series began airing on TV Tokyo from April 5, 2018, to September 26, 2019, succeeding the Aikatsu Stars! anime series in its initial timeslot. For the first 25 episodes, the opening theme is "Thank You⇄Alright" (ありがと⇄大丈夫, Arigato⇄Daijōbu) by Aine and Mio from BEST FRIENDS!, while the ending theme is "Believe it" by Karen and Mirai from BEST FRIENDS!. From episode 26 until episode 50 the opening theme is "What is Only There" (そこにしかないもの Soko ni Shikanai Mono) by Aine and Mio. The ending theme from episode 26 until episode 50 is "Pride" (プライド Puraido) by Karen and Mirai. Since episode 51, the opening theme is "Not Alone! (ひとりじゃない！ Hitori ja nai!)" by Aine, Mio, Maika and Ema while the ending theme is "Be star" by Hibiki from BEST FRIENDS!.

== Episode list ==
=== Season 1 ===
No.	Title	Original release date
1	"Hello Friends!" (Japanese: ハローフレンズ！)	April 5, 2018
2	"The Invincible Love Me Tear☆"; Transliteration: "Muteki no Rabu Mī Tia ☆" (Japanese: 無敵のラブミーティア☆)	April 12, 2018
3	"Vivid Inspiration"; Transliteration: "Bibitto Insupirēshon" (Japanese: ビビっとインスピレーション)	April 19, 2018
4	"The Aspiring My Brand"; Transliteration: "Akogare no Mai Burando" (Japanese: 憧れのマイブランド)	April 26, 2018
5	"Maika, Like a Butterfly!"; Transliteration: "Chō no yō ni, Maika!" (Japanese: 蝶のように 舞花！)	May 3, 2018
6	"Hinata Emergency!?"; Transliteration: "Hinata Emājenshī!?" (Japanese: 日向エマージェンシー！？)	May 10, 2018
7	"The Ongoing Road towards Mirai"; Transliteration: "Mirai e Tsudzuku Michi" (Japanese: ミライへ続く道★)	May 17, 2018
8	"Mio's Grand CM Operation!"; Transliteration: "Mio no CM Daisakusen!" (Japanese: みおのCM大作戦！)	May 24, 2018
9	"The Melody of Courage"; Transliteration: "Yūki no Merodī" (Japanese: 勇気のメロディ)	May 31, 2018
10	"Prett Sexy Honey Cat!"; Transliteration: "Puritī ☆ Sekushī ★ Hanī Kyatto!" (Japanese: プリティー☆セクシー★ハニーキャット！)	June 7, 2018
11	"The Dramatic Confession!"; Transliteration: "Kokuhaku wa Doramachikku!" (Japanese: 告白はドラマチック！)	June 14, 2018
12	"Tomatoes, Bring It On☆"; Transliteration: "Tomato, Dōnto Koi ☆" (Japanese: トマト、どーんとコイ☆)	June 21, 2018
13	"How to Karen"; Transliteration: "How to Karen-san" (Japanese: How to カレンさん)	June 28, 2018
14	"Go Go Friends!" (Japanese: ゴーゴーフレンズ！)	July 5, 2018
15	"AiTube☆Cinderella" (Japanese: アイチューブ☆シンデレラ)	July 19, 2018
16	"Mio, Becoming the Hero"; Transliteration: "Mio, Yūsha ni naru" (Japanese: みお、勇者になる)	July 26, 2018
17	"The Encounter of Fate is of the Moon's Guidance"; Transliteration: "Unmei no Deai wa Tsuki no Michibiki" (Japanese: 運命の出会いは月の導き)	August 2, 2018
18	"Even a Slight Chance"; Transliteration: "Wazu ka na Chansu Sae Mo" (Japanese: わずかなチャンスさえも)	August 9, 2018
19	"Let it Reach! Friends' Power"; Transliteration: "Todoke! Tomodachi kara" (Japanese: 届け！トモダチカラ)	August 16, 2018
20	"Lacrosse or Friends!" (Japanese: ラクロスorフレンズ!)	August 23, 2018
21	"Spreading Harmony♪"; Transliteration: "Hirogaru Hāmonī♪" (Japanese: 広がるハーモニー♪)	August 30, 2018
22	"Premonition of the Full Moon"; Transliteration: "Mangetsu no Yokan" (Japanese: 満月の予感)	September 6, 2018
23	"Shout It at the Moment"; Transliteration: "Sakebu Shunkan" (Japanese: 叫ぶ、瞬間)	September 13, 2018
24	"Rivals are Friends!"; Transliteration: "Raibaru wa Furenzu!" (Japanese: ライバルはフレンズ！)	September 20, 2018
25	"Surpass Love Me Tear!"; Transliteration: "Rabu Mī Tia o Koero!" (Japanese: ラブミーティアをこえろ！)	September 27, 2018
26	"Friends Gathered - Autumn of Aikatsu"; Transliteration: "Furenzu Shūgō - Aikatsu no Aki" (Japanese: フレンズ集合-アイカツの秋)	October 4, 2018
27	"Full Moon's Radiance"; Transliteration: "Furu Mūn no Kagayaki" (Japanese: フルムーンの輝き)	October 11, 2018
28	"Friends Even When We're Alone"; Transliteration: "Hitori demo Furenzu" (Japanese: ひとりでもフレンズ)	October 18, 2018
29	"Aine's Halloween Panic!"; Transliteration: "Aine no Harowin Panikku!" (Japanese: あいねのハロウィンパニック！)	October 25, 2018
30	"Dubbing Challenge, Mio"; Transliteration: "Afureko Charenji Mio" (Japanese: アフレコチャレンジ★みお)	November 1, 2018
31	"The Legendary 101st Match!"; Transliteration: "Densetsu no 101-ban shōbu!" (Japanese: 伝説の101番勝負！)	November 8, 2018
32	"Heart-Pounding☆Adventure on Karen Island!"; Transliteration: "Dokidoki ☆ Bōken Karen-jima!" (Japanese: ドキドキ☆冒険カレン島！)	November 15, 2018
33	"Kaboom! Adventure on the Volcano Island"; Transliteration: "Dokkan! Bōken Kazan-shima" (Japanese: ドッカ～ン冒険カザン島)	November 22, 2018
34	"Happiness to Everyone"; Transliteration: "Minna ni Hapinesu" (Japanese: みんなにハピネス)	November 29, 2018
35	"Treasure Hunter Warning!"; Transliteration: "Torejā Hantā Chūihō!" (Japanese: トレジャーハンター注意報！)	December 6, 2018
36	"Runway of Trouble!"; Transliteration: "Haran no Ranwei!" (Japanese: 波乱のランウェイ！)	December 13, 2018
37	"Merry Friends Christmas"; Transliteration: "Merī Furenzu Kurisumasu" (Japanese: メリーフレンズクリスマス)	December 20, 2018
38	"I'm Coco! Aikatsu Song Battle"; Transliteration: "Koko da yo! Aikatsu Utagassen" (Japanese: ココだよ！ アイカツ歌合戦)	December 27, 2018
39	"Opening! Diamond Friends Cup"; Transliteration: "Kaimaku! Daiyamondo Furenzu Kappu" (Japanese: 開幕！ダイヤモンドフレンズカップ)	January 10, 2019
40	"Believe it"	January 17, 2019
41	"Unleash the Love Me Zone!"; Transliteration: "Rabu Mī Zōn o Tokihanate!" (Japanese: ラブミーゾーンを解き放て！)	January 24, 2019
42	"The Miracle of Friends' Power"; Transliteration: "Tomodachikara no Kiseki" (Japanese: トモダチカラのキセキ)	January 31, 2019
43	"The Scenery of Gratitude"; Transliteration: "Arigatō no Keshiki" (Japanese: ありがとうの景色)	February 7, 2019
44	"The Chocolate and Mint Confession"; Transliteration: "Chokotto Minto na Kokuhaku" (Japanese: チョコっとミントな告白)	February 14, 2019
45	"The Friends are Paparazzi!?"; Transliteration: "Tomodachi wa Paparatchi!?" (Japanese: 友達はパパラッチ！？)	February 21, 2019
46	"The Princess from the Moon"; Transliteration: "Tsuki kara kita Purinsesu" (Japanese: 月から来たプリンセス)	February 28, 2019
47	"An Idol's Coco-mprehension★"; Transliteration: "Aidoru no Kokoroe★" (Japanese: アイドルのココろえ★)	March 7, 2019
48	"The Cats' Honey Work"; Transliteration: "Kyatto-tachi no Hanī na oshigoto" (Japanese: キャットたちのハニーなお仕事)	March 14, 2019
49	"The Last Chapter of the Legend"; Transliteration: "Densetsu no Saishūshō" (Japanese: 伝説の最終章)	March 21, 2019
50	"The Future That's Only There"; Transliteration: "Soko ni Shikanai Mirai" (Japanese: そこにしかない未来)	March 28, 2019

=== Season 2 ===
No.	Season No.	Title	Original Airdate
51	1	"The Idol from Outer Space"; Transliteration: "Uchū Kara Kita Aidoru" (Japanese: 宇宙から来たアイドル)	April 4, 2019
52	2	"The Miraculous Gemstone"; Transliteration: "Kagayaki no Genseki" (Japanese: かがやきの原石)	April 11, 2019
53	3	"Hibiki's Showtime!"; Transliteration: "Hibiki no Shōtaimu!" (Japanese: ひびきのショータイム！)	April 18, 2019
54	4	"Shining! My Color!"; Transliteration: "Kagayake! Atashi no Iro!" (Japanese: かがやけ！あたしの色！)	April 25, 2019
55	5	"Shuffle!? Friends!"; Transliteration: "Shaffuru!? Furenzu!" (Japanese: シャッフル！？フレンズ！)	May 2, 2019
56	6	"You too MyStar"; Transliteration: "Kimi datte My Star" (Japanese: 君だってMyStar)	May 9, 2019
57	7	"GoGo☆Sorbett Kingdom"; Transliteration: "GoGo☆Sorubetto Ōkoku" (Japanese: GoGo☆ソルベット王国)	May 16, 2019
58	8	"Princess Alicia"; Transliteration: "Ōjo Arishia" (Japanese: 王女アリシア)	May 23, 2019
59	9	"The Secret Words are evol ustakiA!"; Transliteration: "Aikotoba wa kisuidatsukaia!" (Japanese: 合言葉はキスイダツカイア！)	May 30, 2019
60	10	"Aikatsu! Forbidden!?"; Transliteration: "Aikatsu! Kinshi-rei!?" (Japanese: アイカツ！禁止令!?)	June 6, 2019
61	11	"Open the Door of Your Heart"; Transliteration: "Kokoro no tobira o akete" (Japanese: 心の扉をあけて)	June 13, 2019
62	12	"Friends Back Party"; Transliteration: "Tomodachi kaeru pāti" (Japanese: 友達かえるパーティ)	June 20, 2019
63	13	"All roads lead to Aikatsu!"; Transliteration: "Subete no michi wa Aikatsu ni tsūzu!" (Japanese: すべての道はアイカツに通ず！)	June 27, 2019
64	14	"Honey Cat is a Galaxy☆"; Transliteration: "Hanī Kyatto wa gyarakushī☆" (Japanese: ハニーキャットはギャラクシー☆)	July 4, 2019
65	15	"Heart-Pounding Friends Date"; Transliteration: "Dokidoki Furenzudēto" (Japanese: ドキドキ フレンズデート)	July 11, 2019
66	16	"Wakaba, I'll Do It All!"; Transliteration: "Wakaba, maru tto yatchau zo!" (Japanese: わかば、まるっとやっちゃうぞ！)	July 18, 2019
67	17	"From Mirai, to the Future"; Transliteration: "Mirai kara, mirai e" (Japanese: ミライから、未来へ)	July 25, 2019
68	18	"Whoosh Whoosh! Fierce on Karen Island!"; Transliteration: "Byunbyun! Gekisō Karen-jima!" (Japanese: ビュンビュン！激走カレン島！)	August 1, 2019
69	19	"Everyone is Seakatsu!"; Transliteration: "Min'na de Umikatsu!" (Japanese: みんなでウミカツ！)	August 8, 2019
70	20	"To the New Stage"; Transliteration: "Aratanaru Sutēji e" (Japanese: 新たなるステージへ)	August 15, 2019
71	21	"Sakuya's Thoughts, Kaguya's Wishes"; Transliteration: "Sakuya no omoi, Kaguya no negai" (Japanese: さくやの思い、かぐやの願い)	August 22, 2019
72	22	"LOVE ME TEAR"; Transliteration: "Rabu Mī Tia" (Japanese: ラブ ミー ティア)	August 29, 2019
73	23	"The Night Before the Jeweling Festival"; Transliteration: "Jueringu Fesutibaru Zen'yasai" (Japanese: ジュエリングフェスティバル前夜祭)	September 5, 2019
74	24	"A Stage Beyond Time"; Transliteration: "Toki wo koeta Sutēji" (Japanese: 時を超えたステージ)	September 12, 2019
75	25	"I'm Not Alone!"; Transliteration: "Hitori Janai!" (Japanese: ひとりじゃない！)	September 19, 2019
76	26	"Everyone Everyone Friends!"; Transliteration: "Min'na Min'na Furenzu!" (Japanese: みんなみんな フレンズ！)	September 26, 2019
