= List of The Devil Is a Part-Timer! episodes =

The Devil Is a Part-Timer! (はたらく魔王さま! Hataraku Maō-sama!) is a fantasy–comedy Japanese anime television series based on the light novels written by Satoshi Wagahara. In another dimension, the Dark Lord Satan and his forces of evil are defeated by the Hero Emilia Justina. Satan and his Demon general Alciel are forced to flee through a portal which drops them off in modern-day Japan. With their magic slowly depleting in an unfamiliar world, they are forced to assume the lives of normal human beings in order to survive. The Hero Emilia Justina follows them through the portal and she too is met with the same circumstances. Although Emilia still harbors negative feelings towards Satan for his past acts of evil, they become unlikely allies in order to survive.

The first season was produced by White Fox and directed by Naoto Hosoda, with series composition by Masahiro Yokotani, character designs by Atsushi Ikariya, art direction by Yoshito Takamine and sound direction by Jin Aketagawa. The thirteen episode series premiered between April 4 and June 27, 2013, on Tokyo MX and was later aired on KBS, SUN, BS Nittele, TV Aichi and AT-X. Pony Canyon released the series in Japan on six Blu-ray and DVD volumes starting on July 3, 2013. The anime was acquired by Funimation for streaming in North America. Manga Entertainment later licensed the series for distribution in the United Kingdom. This was followed by an acquisition by Siren Visual for home media distribution in Australia and New Zealand and online streaming on AnimeLab in 2014. Since 2022, the series is now streaming outside of Asia on Crunchyroll, a video streaming service that Funimation's parent company, Sony Pictures Television, acquired from WarnerMedia in 2021, who in turn acquired Funimation in 2018.

A second season was announced at Kadokawa's Light Novel Expo on March 6, 2021, with the main cast reprising their roles. The second season, titled The Devil Is a Part-Timer!!, is animated by 3Hz, with Daisuke Tsukushi directing, Ydai Iino designing the characters, Yoshihiro Takeda serving as chief animation director and the rest of the staff returning from the first season. The second season aired from July 14 to September 29, 2022.

A sequel was announced following the conclusion of the second season. It was later confirmed to be the second part of Season 2, which aired from July 13 to September 28, 2023. (Note: The second part is formally considered the "second season" of season 2 in Japan, as the actual second season is treated as a sequel series to the first in promotional material.) The opening theme is "Hikari no Nai Machi" (光のない街; lit. "Town Without Light") performed by nano.RIPE, while the ending theme is "Bloomin" performed by Liyuu.

== Series overview ==
Season	Episodes		Originally released	
Season	Episodes		First released	Last released
1	13		April 3, 2013	June 29, 2013
2	24	12	July 14, 2022	September 29, 2022
2	24	12	July 13, 2023	September 28, 2023

== Episode list ==
=== Season 1 (2013) ===
No. overall	No. in season	Title (Note: All English titles are taken from Funimation.)	Original release date (Note: The Devil Is a Part-Timer! premiered in Tokyo MX's Thursday 22:00 (10:00pm JST) time slot.)	Ref.
1	1	"The Devil Arrives in Sasazuka"; Transliteration: "Maō, Sasazuka ni Tatsu" (Japanese: 魔王、笹塚に立つ)	April 4, 2013	
2	2	"The Hero Stays at the Devil's Castle for Work Reasons"; Transliteration: "Yūsha, Shigoto Yūsen de Maōjō ni Tomaru" (Japanese: 勇者、仕事優先で魔王城に泊まる)	April 11, 2013	
3	3	"The Devil Goes on a Date with His Junior in Shinjuku"; Transliteration: "Maō, Shinjuku de Kōhai to Dēto Suru" (Japanese: 魔王、新宿で後輩とデートする)	April 18, 2013	
4	4	"The Hero Experiences Human Warmth"; Transliteration: "Yūsha, Kokoro no Atatakasa ni Fureru" (Japanese: 勇者、心の温かさに触れる)	April 25, 2013	
5	5	"The Devil and the Hero Save Sasazuka"; Transliteration: "Maō to Yūsha, Sasazuka o Sukuu" (Japanese: 魔王と勇者、笹塚を救う)	May 2, 2013	
6	6	"The Devil Climbs the Stairway to School"; Transliteration: "Maō, Gakkō no Kaidan o Noboru" (Japanese: 魔王、学校の階段を昇る)	May 9, 2013	
7	7	"The Devil's Budget Is Saved by Neighborliness"; Transliteration: "Maō, Kinjozukiai de Kakei o Tasukerareru" (Japanese: 魔王、近所付き合いで家計を助けられる)	May 16, 2013	
8	8	"The Hero Enters the Fray"; Transliteration: "Yūsha, Shuraba ni Totsunyū Suru" (Japanese: 勇者、修羅場に突入する)	May 23, 2013	
9	9	"The Hero Experiences a Fray"; Transliteration: "Yūsha, Shuraba o Keiken Suru" (Japanese: 勇者、修羅場を経験する)	May 30, 2013	
10	10	"The Devil and the Hero Take a Break from the Daily Routine"; Transliteration: "Maō to Yūsha, Itsumo to Chigatta Nichijō o Sugosu" (Japanese: 魔王と勇者、いつもと違った日常を過ごす)	June 6, 2013	
11	11	"The Hero Stays True to Her Convictions"; Transliteration: "Yūsha, Onore no Shinnen o Tsuranuku" (Japanese: 勇者、己の信念を貫く)	June 13, 2013	
12	12	"The Devil Carries Out His Duties"; Transliteration: "Maō, Onore no Shokuseki o Hatasu" (Japanese: 魔王、己の職責を果たす)	June 20, 2013	
13	13	"The Devil and the Hero Do Some Honest Hard Work"; Transliteration: "Maō to Yūsha, Mattō ni Shigoto ni Hagemu" (Japanese: 魔王と勇者、真っ当に仕事に励む)	June 27, 2013	

=== Season 2 (2022–2023) ===
No. overall	No. in season	Title	Original release date
Part 1
14	1	"The Devil Screams in Sasazuka"; Transliteration: "Maō, Sasazuka ni Sakebu" (Japanese: 魔王、笹塚に叫ぶ)	July 14, 2022
15	2	"The Devil and the Hero Inconceivably Become Parents"; Transliteration: "Maō to Yūsha, Mi ni Oboenaku Oya ni Naru" (Japanese: 魔王と勇者、身に覚えなく親になる)	July 21, 2022
16	3	"The Devil and the Hero Go to the Amusement Park as Advised"; Transliteration: "Maō to Yūsha, Susume ni Shitagai Yuenchi ni Iku" (Japanese: 魔王と勇者、勧めに従い遊園地に行く)	July 28, 2022
17	4	"The Devil Learns the Pain of Losing Something Precious"; Transliteration: "Maō, Taisetsu na Mono o Ushinau Kurushimi o Shiru" (Japanese: 魔王、大切なものを失う苦しみを知る)	August 4, 2022
18	5	"The Devil Is at Sea After Losing His Home and His Job"; Transliteration: "Maō, Ie mo Shigoto mo Ushinai Tohōnikureru" (Japanese: 魔王、家も仕事も失い途方に暮れる)	August 11, 2022
19	6	"The Hero Helps the Devil Reequip His Workplace"; Transliteration: "Yūsha, Maō no Shokuba no Dai Kaizō ni Kyōryoku Suru" (Japanese: 勇者、魔王の職場の大改造に協力する)	August 18, 2022
20	7	"The Devil Learns That Choshi (and the World) Are Bigger than He Knew"; Transliteration: "Maō, Chōshi to Sekai no Hiro-sa o Shiru" (Japanese: 魔王、銚子と世界の広さを知る)	August 25, 2022
21	8	"The Devil Begins Farming"; Transliteration: "Maō, Shūnō Suru" (Japanese: 魔王、就農する)	September 1, 2022
22	9	"The Devil and the Hero Rise Up to Defend the Sasakis"; Transliteration: "Maō to Yūsha, Sasaki-ke o Mamoru Tame ni Tachiagaru" (Japanese: 魔王と勇者、佐々木家を守るために立ち上がる)	September 8, 2022
23	10	"The Devil Adamantly Insists on Buying a TV"; Transliteration: "Maō, Terebi Kōnyū o Kyōkō ni Shuchō Suru" (Japanese: 魔王、テレビ購入を強硬に主張する)	September 15, 2022
24	11	"The Devil Preaches Human Interaction"; Transliteration: "Maō, Hito to no Kakawari o Toku" (Japanese: 魔王、人との関わりを説く)	September 22, 2022
25	12	"The Devil and The Hero Focuses on Whats happening Right Now"; Transliteration: "Maō to Yūsha, Toriaezu Me no Mae no Dekigoto ni Shūchū Suru" (Japanese: 魔王と勇者、とりあえず目の前の出来事に集中する)	September 29, 2022
Part 2
25.5	12.5	"Recap Special: From Sasazuka to Ente Isla!"; Transliteration: "SP Sasazuka～Ente・Isura e！" (Japanese: SP 笹塚～エンテ・イスラへ！)	July 6, 2023
26	13	"The Devil Returns to the Workplace"; Transliteration: "Maō, Shokuba ni Fukki Suru" (Japanese: 魔王、職場に復帰する)	July 13, 2023
27	14	"The Devil and the Hero Question Their Daily Routine"; Transliteration: "Maō to Yūsha, Nichijō ni Madō" (Japanese: 魔王と勇者、日常に惑う)	July 20, 2023
28	15	"The Devil and the Hero Take the First Steps toward a New Dream"; Transliteration: "Maō to Yūsha, Aratana Yume no Ichi ho o Fumidasu" (Japanese: 魔王と勇者、新たな夢の一歩を踏み出す)	July 27, 2023
29	16	"The Devil and the Hero Go Futon Shopping"; Transliteration: "Maō to Yūsha, wo Futon wo Kai ni" (Japanese: 魔王と勇者、お布団を買いに)	August 3, 2023
30	17	"The Hero Says Good-Bye for a Time"; Transliteration: "Yūsha, Shibashi no Itomagoi wo Suru" (Japanese: 勇者、しばしの暇乞いをする)	August 10, 2023
31	18	"The Devil Gets Off to a Late Start"; Transliteration: "Maō, Deokureru" (Japanese: 魔王、出遅れる)	August 17, 2023
32	19	"The Hero Weeps"; Transliteration: "Yūsha, Naku" (Japanese: 勇者、泣く)	August 24, 2023
33	20	"The Hero Questions Her Hometown"; Transliteration: "Yūsha, Kokyō ni Madō" (Japanese: 勇者、故郷に惑う)	August 31, 2023
34	21	"The Devil Vomits"; Transliteration: "Maō, Haku" (Japanese: 魔王、吐く)	September 7, 2023
35	22	"The Devil Loses His Standing"; Transliteration: "Maō, Tachiba o Ushinau" (Japanese: 魔王、立場を失う)	September 14, 2023
36	23	"The Hero Dances on the Battlefield"; Transliteration: "Yūsha, Senjin ni Odoru" (Japanese: 勇者、戦陣に踊る)	September 21, 2023
37	24	"The Devil and the Hero Witness Change in Ente Isla"; Transliteration: "Maō to Yūsha, Ente Isura no Henkaku ni Tachiau" (Japanese: 魔王と勇者、エンテ・イスラの変革に立ち会う)	September 28, 2023
