= List of animated television series of 2008 =

A list of animated television series first aired in 2008.

Animated television series first aired in 2008
Title	Seasons	Episodes	Country	Year	Original Channel	Technique
3rd & Bird	2	51	United Kingdom, United States	2008–10	CBeebies	Flash
4 Comrades	1	26	Thailand	2008	Channel 7	Traditional
Adiboo Adventure: Mission Earth	1	52	France	2008	France 5	CGI
The Adventures of Hello Kitty & Friends	1	52	Hong Kong, Japan	2008	TVB Jade	CGI
Aesop's Theater	1	39	South Korea	2008	SBS	CGI
Animal Mechanicals	3	73	Canada	2008–11	CBC Television	CGI
Antjes Fischkoppgeschichten	1	26	Germany	2008–09	KI.KA	CGI
As Aventuras de Gui & Estopa	5	92	Brazil	2008–20	Cartoon Network	Flash
asdfmovie	1	16	United Kingdom	2008–present	Newgrounds, YouTube	Flash
Au pays du Père Noël	1	24	France	2008	France 3	CGI
Ava Riko Teo	2	104	France, South Korea	2008	EBS, France 5	Flash
Baby Maze		22	United States	2008	BabyFirstTV	Flash
Balala the Fairies	10	482	China	2008–present		Traditional
Baman Piderman	3	27	United States	2008–present	Mondo Mini Shows	Flash
Batman: The Brave and the Bold	3	65	United States	2008–11	Cartoon Network	Traditional
Ben & Izzy	1	13	Jordan	2008	MBC 3	CGI
Ben 10: Alien Force	3	46	United States	2008–10	Cartoon Network	Traditional
Bert and Ernie's Great Adventures	2	52	United States	2008–11	PBS Kids	Stop motion
Best Ed	1	26	Canada	2008–09	Teletoon	Flash
Betsy's Kindergarten Adventures	1	26	United States	2008	PBS Kids	Traditional
By the Rapids	3	21	Canada	2008–12	APTN	Flash
Os Caça-Livros	1	13	Brazil	2008	TV Rá-Tim-Bum	Flash
Can You Teach My Alligator Manners?	2	20	United States	2008–09	Playhouse Disney	Flash
Cars Toons	2	15	United States	2008–14	Disney Channel	CGI
Chhota Bheem	16	663	India	2008–present	Pogo	Flash
Choripan	1	12	Chile	2008–09	Canal 13	Traditional
Chuggington	6	174	United Kingdom	2008–15, 2021	CBeebies	CGI
Click and Clack's As the Wrench Turns	1	10	Canada, United States	2008	PBS	Flash
Cocomong	3	78	South Korea	2008–15	EBS	CGI
Combo Niños	1	26	France	2008	TF1, Jetix	Flash
Cookie Master	1	100	China	2008		Flash
Crime Time	1	120	India	2008–09	Cartoon Network	Flash
Dex Hamilton: Alien Entomologist	1	26	Australia, Canada	2008–09	Network Ten	Flash
Dogmons!	1	1	Brazil	2008	WTN	Flash
Dooly the Little Dinosaur	1	26	South Korea	2008–09	SBS TV	Traditional
Dork Hunters from Outer Space	2	36	Germany, United Kingdom	2008–09	RTL II	Flash
The Drinky Crow Show	1	10	United States	2008–09	Adult Swim	CGI
Eliot Kid	2	104	France, United Kingdom	2008–09	TF1	Flash
Famous 5: On the Case	1	26	France, United Kingdom	2008	France 3, Disney Channel	Traditional
Farmkids	2	26	France, Australia	2008		CGI
Frances	1	6	United States	2008	PBS Kids Sprout	CGI
Fred's Head	1	26	Canada, France	2008	Teletoon, France 2	Flash
Freefonix	1	40	United Kingdom	2008–09	BBC One, CBBC	CGI
G2G: Got to Go!	1	26	Australia, Canada	2008	Nine Network	Flash
The Garfield Show	5	107	France, United States	2008–15	France 3	CGI
Giga Tribe	1	39	South Korea	2008–09	SBS TV	Traditional
The Gloops		104	Spain	2008		CGI
Gormiti	3	65	France, Italy	2008–11	Italia 1, Canal J	Traditional
Grabby Bag	1	12	Ireland	2008		CGI
Hairy Scary	1	52	France	2008	France 3	CGI
Hanitzotzot Shel Maor	1	21	Israel	2008	Jetix	Flash
Harry & Toto	1	26	United Kingdom	2008	CBeebies	Flash
Headcases	1	8	United Kingdom	2008	ITV	CGI
The Heroes	5	63	Iran	2008–present	IRIB TV2, IRIB TV1	Flash
Inami	1	26	France	2008	TF1	Traditional
It's the Neck Show	1	26	Argentina	2008	Nat Geo y Yo	CGI
Joey's Toy Box		40	United States	2008	BabyFirstTV	Flash
Jurassic Cubs	4	104	Italy	2008–16	Rai Due	Traditional
Juro que Vi	1	5	Brazil	2008	TV Rá-Tim-Bum	Traditional
Just So Stories	1	10	France	2008	France 3	Flash
Ka-Pow!	1	6	United States	2008	Mondo Mini Shows	Flash
Kerwhizz	2	41	United Kingdom	2008–11	CBeebies	CGI/Live action
Kid vs. Kat	2	52	Canada	2008–11	YTV	Flash
A Kind of Magic	2	78	France	2008–18	France 3, Disney Channel, Gulli, Canal J	Flash
Leonardo	1	26	Italy	2008	Rai Due	Traditional
The Life & Times of Tim	3	30	United States	2008–12	HBO	Flash
Life's a Zoo	2	20	Canada	2008–09	Teletoon Detour	Stop motion
Lifeboat Luke	1	52	Ireland	2008	RTÉ Two	Flash
Little Cherry	2	52	China	2008	CCTV	
Loulou de Montmartre	1	26	France	2008	France 3	Traditional
Magic Wonderland	2	26	China	2008		CGI
Making Fiends (2008)	1	6	United States	2008	Nicktoons Network	Flash
Martha Speaks	6	96	Canada, United States	2008–14	PBS Kids, TVOntario	Flash
The Marvelous Misadventures of Flapjack	3	46	United States	2008–10	Cartoon Network	Traditional (Episodes)/Stop motion (Theme song)
Master Raindrop	1	26	Australia, New Zealand, Singapore	2008	Seven Network	CGI
Matt's Monsters	1	52	France, Italy	2008–09	Canal+ Family, M6, Rai Due	Traditional/Flash
Max on Snax	1	3	United States	2008	AFN Family	Flash
Max Steel Turbo Missions	4	47	Canada, United States	2008–11		CGI
Me, Myself and the Others	2	78	Germany, Italy	2008–11	KI.KA, Rai Due	
Megaminimals		104	Spain, China	2008	TV3	Flash
The Mighty B!	2	40	United States	2008–11	Nickelodeon, Nicktoons	Traditional
Milly, Molly	2	52	New Zealand, Singapore	2008–10		Flash
The Minimighty Kids	3	231	France	2008–19	TF1	Traditional
Missy Mila Twisted Tales	`1	52	Belgium, France	2008	France 5, Piwi	Flash
Mixed Nutz	1	13	Canada, United States	2008	Syndication	Flash
Die Moffels	3	39	Germany	2008–19	KI.KA	CGI
Il mondo di Stefi	1	52	Italy	2008	Rai Tre	Traditional
Monsters & Pirates	2	26	Italy	2008–14	Italia 1	Traditional
The Mr. Men Show	2	52	United Kingdom, United States	2008–09	Five, Cartoon Network	Flash
My Big Big Friend	2	52	Brazil, Canada	2008–11	Discovery Kids (Brazil), Treehouse TV (Canada)	Flash
The New Adventures of Nanoboy	1	26	Canada, Singapore	2008		Flash
Ni Hao, Kai-Lan	3	42	United States, China	2008-11	Nick Jr., CCTV-Children	Traditional
Nighty Night	1	7	Israel	2008	Hop! Channel	Flash
The Notekins		36	United States, Israel	2008	BabyFirstTV	Flash
Numbers Around The Globe		22	United States	2008	BabyFirstTV	Flash
Once Upon a Time... Planet Earth	1	26	France	2008	Gulli	Traditional
Papawa		104	Spain	2008	TV3	Flash
Peanuts Motion Comics	1	20	United States, Canada	2008	iTunes	Flash
Pedro and Frankensheep		10	United Kingdom	2008	CBBC	Flash
The Penguins of Madagascar	3	149	United States	2008–15	Nickelodeon, Nicktoons	CGI
Pepee	6	186	Turkey	2008–16	TRT Çocuk, Show TV, Planet Çocuk	CGI
Petit Petit Muse	1	26	South Korea	2008	KBS1	Traditional
The Pinky and Perky Show	1	52	France, United Kingdom	2008	CBBC	CGI
Le professeur Gamberge	1	50	France	2008	France 3	
Pubertad	3	78	Cuba	2008–10	Cubavisión	Flash
Punch!	1	20	Canada	2008	The Detour On Teletoon	Flash
O Que Eu Vou Ser Quando Crescer?	1	13	Brazil	2008	TV Rá-Tim-Bum	CGI
Rahan: Son of the Dark Age	1	26	France, Italy	2008–09	Canal+ Family	Traditional
Random! Cartoons	1	13	United States	2008–09	Nicktoons Network	CGI/Traditional/Flash
Razzberry Jazzberry Jam	2	26	Canada	2008	CBC Television	Flash
Os Reciclados	1	13	Brazil	2008	TV Rá-Tim-Bum	Flash
Rocket Boy and Toro	1	52	South Korea, United Kingdom	2008–09	CBBC	Traditional
Sammy's Story Shop	1	26	United States	2008–09	Qubo	Flash
Samuel y las Cosas	1	41	Venezuela	2008–09	ViVe	CGI
Sandokan: The Two Tigers	1	26	Italy	2008–09	Rai Due	Traditional
The Salads	1	26	Thailand	2008		CGI
The Secret Saturdays	2	36	United States	2008–10	Cartoon Network	Traditional
Shelldon	3	78	Thailand, United States, Singapore (seasons 1–2), Taiwan (season 1)	2008–11	Channel 3 (Thailand), Qubo (United States)	CGI
Sid the Science Kid; Jim Henson's Sid the Science Kid	2	66	United States	2008–12	PBS Kids	CGI
Simon's Cat		140	United Kingdom	2008–present	YouTube	Flash
Slangman's World	2	11	United States	2008	AFN Family	Flash/Live action
Spaceballs: The Animated Series	1	13	United States	2008–09	G4	Flash
The Spectacular Spider-Man	2	26	United States	2008–09	The CW, Disney XD	Traditional
Speed Racer: The Next Generation	2	52	United States, Ireland, India	2008–13	Nicktoons Network	Flash
Star Wars: The Clone Wars	7	133	United States	2008–14; 20	Cartoon Network, Disney+	CGI
Stone Age	1	52	Germany, Italy, Spain	2008	Junior, Rai Due	Flash
Supa Strikas	7	91	South Africa; Malaysia	2008–20		Flash
Superjail!	4	36	United States	2008–14	Adult Swim	Traditional (season 1); Flash (seasons 2–4)
Tasty Time with ZeFronk	2	20	United States	2008–10	Playhouse Disney	Flash
Tchibum TV	1	13	Brazil	2008	TV Rá-Tim-Bum	CGI
Team Deutschland	1	7	Germany	2008–09	NDR	Flash
Three Delivery	1	26	Canada, United States	2008–09	YTV, Nicktoons Network	Flash
Tiki's Band	1	8	Germany	2008	Das Erste	CGI
Toot & Puddle	1	26	Canada, United States	2008–09	Treehouse TV	Traditional/Flash
Turbo Dogs	1	26	Canada	2008–11	CBC Television	CGI
Two Tone Motion		29	United States	2008	BabyFirstTV	Flash
Vinz et Lou sur Internet	1	15	France	2008	M6	Flash
Wakfu	4	78	France	2008–present	France 3	Flash; Traditional (season 3-present)
Whiffle & Fuzz	2	52	France	2008–09	Playhouse Disney	Flash
Wedgies	1	29	United States	2008	Cartoon Network	Flash/Traditional
Willa's Wild Life	1	26	Canada, France	2008–09	YTV	Flash
World of Quest	2	26	Canada, United States	2008–09	Kids' WB, Teletoon	Flash
The Xtacles	1	2	United States	2008	Adult Swim	Flash
Zeke's Pad	1	26	Canada, Australia, United States	2008	YTV, Seven Network	CGI
Zoomix	1	104	Spain	2008		Flash

Anime television series first aired in 2008
Title	Episodes	Country	Year	Original Channel	Technique
Akaneiro ni Somaru Saka	12	Japan	2008		Traditional
Akiba-chan	10	Japan	2008	Kids Station	CGI/Stop motion
Allison & Lillia	26	Japan	2008		Traditional
Amatsuki	13	Japan	2008		Traditional
Antique Bakery	12	Japan	2008		Traditional
Aria the Origination	13	Japan	2008		Traditional
Astro Fighter Sunred	26	Japan	2008–09		
Battle Spirits: Shounen Toppa Bashin	50	Japan	2008–09		Traditional
Birdy the Mighty: Decode	13	Japan	2008		Traditional
Black Butler	24	Japan	2008–09		Traditional
Blassreiter	24	Japan	2008		Traditional
Blue Dragon: Trials of the Seven Shadows	51	Japan	2008–09		Traditional
Bus Gamer	3	Japan	2008		Traditional
Casshern Sins	24	Japan	2008–09		Traditional
A Certain Magical Index	24	Japan	2008–09		Traditional
Chaos;Head	12	Japan	2008		Traditional
Chi's Sweet Home	208	Japan	2008–09		Traditional
Clannad After Story	24	Japan	2008–09		Traditional
Code Geass: Lelouch of the Rebellion R2	25	Japan	2008		Traditional
Corpse Princess: Aka	13	Japan	2008		Traditional
Da Capo II: Second Season	13	Japan	2008		Traditional
Dinosaur King Season 2	30	Japan	2008		Traditional
Domo TV	26	Japan, United States	2008–09	NHK	Stop motion
Duel Masters Cross	100	Japan	2008–10		Traditional
The Earl and the Fairy	12	Japan	2008		Traditional
ef – a tale of melodies.	12	Japan	2008		Traditional
The Familiar of Zero: Rondo of Princesses	12	Japan	2008		Traditional
Fireball	13	Japan	2008		CGI
Ga-Rei: Zero	12	Japan	2008		Traditional
Gag Manga Biyori 3	12	Japan	2008		Traditional
Glass Maiden	12	Japan	2008		Traditional
Golgo 13	50	Japan	2008–09		Traditional
Gunslinger Girl -Il Teatrino-	13	Japan	2008		Traditional
H_{2}O: Footprints in the Sand	12	Japan	2008		Traditional
Hakaba Kitarō	11	Japan	2008		Traditional
Hakken Taiken Daisuki! Shimajirō	101	Japan	2008–10		Traditional
Haruka Nogizaka's Secret	12	Japan	2008		Traditional
Hatenkou Yugi	10	Japan	2008		Traditional
Hell Girl: Three Vessels	26	Japan	2008–09		Traditional
Hidamari Sketch × 365	13	Japan	2008		Traditional
Hyakko	13	Japan	2008		Traditional
Ikki Tousen: Great Guardians	12	Japan	2008		Traditional
Inazuma Eleven	127	Japan	2008–11		Traditional
Itazura na Kiss	25	Japan	2008		Traditional
Junjo Romantica	12	Japan	2008		Traditional
Junjo Romantica 2	12	Japan	2008		Traditional
Kaiba	12	Japan	2008		Traditional
Kamen no Maid Guy	12	Japan	2008		Traditional
Kannagi: Crazy Shrine Maidens	13	Japan	2008		Traditional
Kanokon	12	Japan	2008		Traditional
Kemeko Deluxe!	12	Japan	2008		Traditional
Kimi ga Aruji de Shitsuji ga Ore de	13	Japan	2008		Traditional
Kirarin Revolution Stage 3	51	Japan	2008–09	TV Tokyo	
Koihime Musō	12	Japan	2008		Traditional
Kure-nai	12	Japan	2008		Traditional
Kurozuka	12	Japan	2008		Traditional
Kyo Kara Maoh! Third Series	39	Japan	2008–09		Traditional
Kyō no Go no Ni	13	Japan	2008		Traditional
Kyōran Kazoku Nikki	26	Japan	2008		Traditional
Legends of the Dark King: A Fist of the North Star Story	13	Japan	2008		Traditional
Library War	12	Japan	2008		Traditional
Linebarrels of Iron	24	Japan	2008–09		Traditional
Macross Frontier	25	Japan	2008		Traditional
Magician's Academy	12	Japan	2008		Traditional
Michiko & Hatchin	22	Japan	2008–09		Traditional
Minami-ke: Okawari	13	Japan	2008		Traditional
Mission-E	12	Japan	2008		Traditional
Mnemosyne	6	Japan	2008		Traditional
Mobile Suit Gundam 00 Second Season	25	Japan	2008–09		Traditional
Moegaku★5	8	Japan	2008		Traditional/Live action
Monochrome Factor	24	Japan	2008		Traditional
Mōryō no Hako	13	Japan	2008		Traditional
Nabari no Ou	26	Japan	2008		Traditional
Natsume's Book of Friends	13	Japan	2008	TV Tokyo	Traditional
Neko Ramen: Ore no Shouyu Aji	13	Japan	2008		Flash
Neo Angelique Abyss	13	Japan	2008		Traditional
Neo Angelique Abyss -Second Age-	13	Japan	2008		Traditional
Net Ghost PiPoPa	51	Japan	2008–09		Traditional
New Attacker You!	52	Japan	2008		Traditional
Nijū Mensō no Musume	22	Japan	2008		Traditional
Nodame Cantabile: Paris	11	Japan	2008		Traditional
Noramimi	12	Japan	2008		Traditional
Noramimi 2	12	Japan	2008		Traditional
Ocha-ken: Ryokutto Monogatari	13	Japan	2008–09		
One Outs	25	Japan	2008–09		Traditional
Onegai My Melody Kirara	52	Japan	2008–09		Traditional
Our Home's Fox Deity	24	Japan	2008		Traditional
Panpaka Pants		Japan	2008		Flash
A Penguin's Troubles	100	Japan	2008–10		
Persona: Trinity Soul	26	Japan	2008		Traditional
Porphy no Nagai Tabi	52	Japan	2008		Traditional
Psychic Squad	51	Japan	2008–09		Traditional
Real Drive	26	Japan	2008		Traditional
RoboDz Kazagumo Hen	26	Japan	2008	Toon Disney	CGI
Rosario + Vampire	13	Japan	2008		Traditional
Rosario + Vampire Capu2	13	Japan	2008		Traditional
S.A	24	Japan	2008		Traditional
Sands of Destruction	13	Japan	2008		Traditional
Sekirei	12	Japan	2008		Traditional
Shigofumi: Letters from the Departed	12	Japan	2008		Traditional
Shugo Chara!! Doki—	51	Japan	2008–09		Traditional
Sisters of Wellber Zwei	13	Japan	2008		Traditional
Skip Beat!	25	Japan	2008–09		Traditional
Slayers Revolution	13	Japan	2008		Traditional
Someday's Dreamers II: Sora	12	Japan	2008		Traditional
Soul Eater	51	Japan	2008–09		Traditional
Spice and Wolf	13	Japan	2008		Traditional
Stitch!	25	Japan	2008–09		Traditional
Strike Witches	12	Japan	2008		Traditional
Sugarbunnies: Chocolat!	27	Japan	2008		Traditional
Tales of the Abyss	26	Japan	2008–09		Traditional
Telepathy Shōjo Ran	26	Japan	2008		Traditional
To Love Ru	26	Japan	2008		Traditional
Top Secret ~The Revelation~	26	Japan	2008		Traditional
Toradora!	25	Japan	2008–09		Traditional
The Tower of Druaga: The Aegis of Uruk	12	Japan	2008		Traditional
True Tears	13	Japan	2008		Traditional
Tytania	26	Japan	2008–09		Traditional
Uchi no Sanshimai	141	Japan	2008–10		Flash
Ultraviolet: Code 044	12	Japan	2008		Traditional
Vampire Knight	13	Japan	2008		Traditional
Vampire Knight Guilty	13	Japan	2008		Traditional
xxxHolic: Kei	13	Japan	2008		Traditional
Yakushiji Ryōko no Kaiki Jikenbo	13	Japan	2008		Traditional
Yatterman	60	Japan	2008–09		Traditional
Yes! PreCure 5 Go Go!	48	Japan	2008–09		Traditional
Yozakura Quartet	12	Japan	2008		Traditional
Yu-Gi-Oh! 5D's	154	Japan	2008–11	TV Tokyo	Traditional
Zoku Sayonara, Zetsubou-Sensei	13	Japan	2008		Traditional

== See also ==
- List of animated feature films of 2008
- List of Japanese animation television series of 2008
