= List of The Earl and the Fairy episodes =

The Earl and the Fairy is a 2008 Japanese anime series produced by Artland, directed by Koichiro Sohtome and scripts composed by Noriko Nagao. Two pieces of theme music will be used, one opening theme and one ending theme. The opening theme, "Feeling", is performed by Acid Flavor while the ending theme, "My Fairy", is performed by Hikaru Midorikawa, who is also the voice actor for the male protagonist of the story, Edgar J. C. Ashenbert. The anime is scheduled for 12 episodes and will air first on Chiba TV and TV Saitama on October 8, 2008; however, an advanced broadcast of the first episode was aired on AT-X on September 29, 2008.

== Episode list ==
| No. | Title | Original release date |
|---|---|---|
| 1 | "He's a Refined Villain"; Transliteration: "Aitsu wa Yūga na Daiakutō" (Japanese: あいつは優雅な大悪党) | September 29, 2008 |
The episode begins with the appearance a mysterious blond man with "ash mauve" eyes interrogating an old scientist. The story then turns to a fairy doctor, that is, one who mediates between fairies and humans. The fairy doctor, Lydia Carlton, is called to London by her father. While on a ship headed for London with her fairy who looks like a cat Nico, she encounters a young man being held captive by the crew of the boat. He asks for her help in escaping from his captors and explains that they are trying to detain her also, for her help as a fairy doctor. Lydia decides that the best course of action is to help him escape, saving herself in the process. After escaping, the beautiful man introduces himself as Edgar Ashenbert, the legendary Earl of the Blue Knights, or Earl of Ibrasel. They board a ship and Lydia meets Edgar's loyal servant Raven. Edgar has Lydia dress up and they attend a fancy dinner on board. After the dinner Edgar asks Lydia to help him search for the Sword of Merrow.
| 2 | "My Fairy"; Transliteration: "Boku no Yōsei" (Japanese: 僕の妖精) | October 15, 2008 |
Lydia is still debating whether to help Edgar in the quest of finding the Sword of Merrow or not but a war ship arrives and Edgar brings Lydia back to their room. They are followed by the lackeys of the young man who first tried to hold Lydia captive. Edgar is wounded while trying to protect Lydia. Raven immediately appears and tells Edgar to go, as he will take care of it. Edgar and Lydia run until they reach an abandoned cottage in the woods. Lydia sees Nico and is a little shocked. Nico gives her pills that can put Edgar to sleep. At first, Lydia doesn't like the idea, but she finally agrees with Nico. She goes back inside the house and gets Edgar a cup of hot water, but slips the pills in also. She then hands the water to Edgar, who has noticed that she put something in it. He tells her that his life depends on her, which causes Lydia's heart to soften a little. Edgar also tells her that if he wakes up and Lydia isn't there he will die. In the end, Lydia decides to stay and is woken by Edgar's flirtatious greeting.
| 3 | "Island of the Merrow"; Transliteration: "Merou no Shima" (Japanese: メロウの島) | October 22, 2008 |
Raven meets up with Lydia and Edgar and along with Nico and three brownies (small brown fairies with cute faces) board a ship to go to an island. On the island they stay at an inn. Lydia lies on the couch while Edgar asks the innkeeper about the castle. The innkeeper states that all who have visited the castle die within three days after leaving the castle. After the innkeeper leaves, Lydia gets a glass a water and makes a path after noticing the three brownies. The next scene shows Raven and Edgar talking about Lydia and a girl named Ermine. Lydia was listening in on their conversation without them knowing. Edgar, however, realizes that Lydia is eaves-dropping on their conversation and ends it. Then asks Raven to escort Lydia back to her room. While escorting her back, Raven tells Lydia why Edgar was labeled for murder when he was known as Sir John. The next morning Lydia, Edgar, and Raven go searching around the island looking for clues when they are attacked by Gotham and his men. Raven stalls the men while Edgar and Lydia run. While running they bump into Lydia's father. After a confrontation Lydia's father decides to stop Gotham from firing his gun. Gotham knocks her father out and before Gotham can shoot Edgar tackles him.The struggle and fight and the episode ends with the sound of a loud gunshot.
| 4 | "A Nobleman's Duty"; Transliteration: "Kizoku no Gimu" (Japanese: 貴族の義務) | October 29, 2008 |
Now on Merrow Island, Lydia is cornered by a member of the Unseelie court and with only Nico by her side, who decides to disappear, she cowers before her fate of possibly dying. The wolf lunges at her, but is stopped by Raven just in time. Lydia is surprised and elated that Raven has come to her rescue. Raven fights and scares the Unseelie wolf away. Lydia is then thrown into a cell with her father and apologizes for involving him with the Earl, and asks if he possibly knows where the Earl might be.
| 5 | "The Fairy Queen's Bridegroom"; Transliteration: "Yōsei Joō no Hanamuko" (Japanese: 妖精女王の花婿) | November 5, 2008 |
The episode opens up Kelpie and a field fairy named Marigold with the 'moon'. The Earl hires Lydia (the Fairy Doctor) to work for him. The Earl holds a ball and Kelpie shows up to take Lydia back to Scotland. Kelpie wants Lydia to marry him so he stole the 'moon' from the fairy. When he tries to show Lydia the ring Paul (who is an artist Edgar likes and someone Lydia recently met) steps in and accidentally gets the ring on his finger. The Earl shows up and this ultimately ends the tussle. Kelpie returns to the water. In the end the Earl finds out his claim to the title for the Blue Knight Earl is being challenged.
| 6 | "White Bow, Scarlet Bow"; Transliteration: "Shiroi Yumi Akai Yumi" (Japanese: 白い弓 朱い弓) | November 12, 2008 |
The episode opens up with Lydia in a study room reading a book when Edgar (the Earl) walks in and says that Paul (from previous episode) still can't get the ring off and is wondering about the water horse (Kelpie). Edgar asks if Cain is a real fairy and Lydia says yes but an evil one known as a man-eating Unseelie Court. Another fairy (Sweetpea) comes in looking for Marigold. Sweetpea finds out that the ring is on Paul and says that the Fairy Queen will just marry him. Kelpie come in and say he is going to give the ring to Lydia or he will eat them. Edgar has Paul make a painting using Lydia as a model. Paul tells Lydia of a boy who resembled the Earl, and that that was the person who made him realize that he loved drawing. Lydia finds out over dinner that Edgar was the little boy. Kelpie interrupts their meal and Edgar makes Kelpie eat a liver which is like poison to aquatic horses, sending Kelpie off. Edgar later confesses that he like Lydia and she doesn't believe him. Paul attempts to poison Edgar but then stops Edgar before he drinks it. Edgar is stabbed by someone else with a knife covered in a snake-like poison.
| 7 | "Take the Proposal Gently in Your Hands"; Transliteration: "Puropōzu wa o-Te Yawaraka ni" (Japanese: プロポーズはお手やわらかに) | November 19, 2008 |
Lydia goes to Kelpie to save Edgar from the poison. He can purify water so he can cleanse Edgar's body of the poison. Kelpie then put a dip of his blood to Lydia and says give it to him mouth to mouth or put it somewhere blood flows. She then kisses Edgar's wrist and is about to kiss him on his lips when he opens his eyes. Edgar tells her his dream he had and asks if she will stay by his side and fall in love with him. She smiles and says she will think about it. She ends up leaving and going with Kelpie to the Fairy World. Edgar finds out and goes to bring her back. Lydia ends up accepting the makeshift proposal and goes back to the human realm. When they are back Edgar says that it was a real proposal and acceptance. The mysterious person seen lurking around is Ermine. Paul wakes up after saying he drank a little too much and he finds out there was a girl in his bed. When she cries, her teardrops turn into tiny balls of amber.
| 8 | "Tell Me the Secret of Your Tears"; Transliteration: "Namida no Himitsu o Oshiete" (Japanese: 涙の秘密をおしえて) | November 26, 2008 |
Edgar takes seriously the excuse he made to Lydia in front of Kelpie to actually marry her. A fairy-Coblynau who is the care taker of the moon ring sees that Lydia wears it in front of other men and does not take it off as he explains to her. He thinks it's wrong to not wear it and places it on Lydia's finger and tells her it can not be removen unless sir Edgar himself does. Lydia chooses a dress to wear at the ball; while she is ready to wear it the maids who dress her are having trouble putting her undergarments on, so when Raven hears Lydia scream and thinks that she is in trouble and runs in the room and sees her in her undergarments. Paul brings the lady her found in bed with him to Edgar and Lydia. Lydia says she is a banshee, they cry tears of amber they foresee a death in a clan. Raven sees Kelpie hugging Lydia and sees it as a betrayal and finally attacks. The episode ends with Ermine taking the bashee to her "real master".
| 9 | "A Banshee's Memories"; Transliteration: "Banshī no Kioku" (Japanese: バンシーの記憶) | December 3, 2008 |
Paul goes looking for the banshee with Nico and gets caught by Fairy Doctor (not Lydia). The Prince's men are looking for the banshee's amber so they can unlock her memory and possibly get power equal to the Blue Knight's. In the near end of this episode Edgar almost makes love to Lydia but falls asleep and says Ermine.
| 10 | "With What Time Remaining"; Transliteration: "Nokosareta Jikan" (Japanese: 残された時間) | December 10, 2008 |
Edgar awakens to find a button from Lydia's dress and assumes that they made love. Lydia corrects him and voices that she thinks he's despicable for calling out another girls name (but doesn't tell him whose), then sends him on his way. A painting from Mr. Slades is recognized by Edgar to be a painting from Duke Sylvanford's manner; The painting was later entrusted to Paul's father. A message from Gladys to "eradicate the prince" is written on it. Ermine appears before Edgar to fetch him. Meanwhile Kelpie attempts to take Lydia back to the Fairy World, and once foiled tells her that due to the amber Edgar has not burning, it's prophesy that he has only a few days to live. Cobylnau helps open a path to the Banshee by using the painting (painted with amber!) and soon after Ermine comes and takes Nico and Raven to the Fairy World as well. Parts of Edgar's past are revealed when he meets Ulysses. The episode ends with Edgar challenging Ulysses to see who's more fit to be the Blue Knight Earl!
| 11 | "The Two Blue Knight Earls"; Transliteration: "Futari no Aokishi Hakushaku" (Japanese: ふたりの青騎士伯爵) | December 17, 2008 |
Lydia and Paul arrive in Fairy World where there, strangely, are two moons and begin following a trail of amber leading to the Banshee. Lydia switches places with the Banshee when summoned by Ulysses. There she finds Edgar who takes Ulysses's gun as he advances on Lydia. (Disguised as the Banshee) An accidental fire hits Ulysses as "Jimmy" jumps at Edgar in an attempt to disarm him. Edgar's injury becomes apparent to Lydia after they narrowly escape the hounds and he collapses moments before they appear in a shield of blue light surrounded by snow. Ulysses discovers Paul and realizes that Lydia had been impersonating the Banshee. As the hounds go in for Lydia and the defenseless Edgar, Kelpie jumps in and saves them. Ulysses throws the amber painting in the fire, but it does not burn. Paul is attacked by Ulysses's minions as the Banshee is led away. Edgar tells Lydia once more that he loves her and wants a kiss before he dies. Instead she refuses, saying that that sort of thing can be done when they are safely at home. Just then Ermine appears telling them she will lead the way to the exit.
| 12 | "The Earl and The Fairy"; Transliteration: "Hakushaku to Yōsei" (Japanese: 伯爵と妖精) | December 24, 2008 |
The episode starts off with Lydia's father interacting with Brownie's. Soon after it switches to Edgar, Ermine and Lydia. Ermine leads them towards the exit but along the way they stop when they find Paul in the Banshee's room. Edgar then takes Ermine out with him and locks Paul and Lydia in the room. However, Ermine only leads Edgar to Ulysses whose noble blood is used to ignite the amber hair on the painting which restores the Banshee's memory. Dark fairies are summoned by Ulysses but Raven arrives to defend Edgar just in time. A battle between Raven and "Jimmy" ensues. While Raven is distracted Ulysses attempts to gain an advantage and attack, but then Kelpie appears to protect them. The Banshee is then attacked by the hounds. Lydia discovers that one of the moons is the link that creates an endless night and shoots it to destroy it. Light floods the room, destroying the hounds and healing Edgar's wound. Ulysses and Jimmy flee after announcing that the Prince is coming. The Banshee's wound is announced to be fatal, but she tells them that the prophecy was predicting her death (not Edgar's), and that her job is to give Edgar the key to Ibrazel. It ends with Edgar and Lydia in a carriage "discussing" marriage. As Lydia is breaking down Edgar goes in to kiss her, and finally, she closes her eyes but he only kisses her on the forehead.
