= List of Persona: Trinity Soul episodes =

Official artwork used in the Volume 1 DVD release in Japan showing the Kanzato siblings. From left to right: Ryo, Jun and Shin Kanzato.

Persona: Trinity Soul is an anime television series produced by Aniplex and animated by A-1 Pictures. It began airing on Tokyo MX on January 5, 2008, and ran for twenty-six episodes, concluding on June 28, 2008. The series also aired on BS11, MBS, Animax, CTC, CBC, TV Saitama and tvk.

The show takes place approximately 10 years after the events of Persona 3. A string of mysterious paranormal attacks on civilians in Ayanagi City brings the Kanzato siblings together as they try to figure out who or what is responsible for the attacks. Jun and Shin team up with friends to figure out how the attacks affect their lives with the help of mysterious entities called Personas.

The show featured four theme songs. For the first thirteen episodes, the opening song was "Breakin' Through" by Shūhei Kita and the ending song was "Suicides Love Story" by Nana Kitade. The last thirteen episodes used "Word of the Voice" by Flow as the opening theme and "Found Me" by Yumi Kawamura as the ending theme. Three of these songs were released as singles in 2008: "Breakin' Through" on February 27, "Suicides Love Story" on March 5, and "Word of the Voice" on June 4. "Found Me" can only be found on the soundtrack CD, which was released on July 2, 2008.

In Japan, the entire series was released in 10 volumes. Volume 1 was released April 23, 2008. Volume 2 was released May 28, 2008. Volume 3 was released June 25, 2008. Volume 4 was released July 23, 2008. Volume 5 was released August 27, 2008. Volume 6 was released September 24, 2008. Volume 7 was released October 22, 2008. Volume 8 was released November 26, 2008. Volume 9 was released December 17, 2008. Volume 10 was released January 28, 2009.

== Episodes ==
No.	Title	Original release date
1	"Special "A" Latency"; Transliteration: "Toku A Senzai" (Japanese: 特A潜在)	January 5, 2008
Ryo Kanzato, Superintendent of the Ayanagi Police, is dispatched to a Japanese Coast Guard PLH ship after Japanese Coast Guard crewmembers discover that the entire crew of their Deep Submergence Vehicle went missing, baffling some of them. Meanwhile, mysterious deaths are once more reported throughout the city. Ryo saves Yumi Tasaka, who was under police custody, from being killed by the Persona of an unknown assailant. Ryo's siblings, Shin and Jun, come back to Ayanagi City during the investigation. As Shin takes a walk around the city, he is attacked by that same assailant and his Persona awakens. He later kills his assailant.
2	"Shadow Extraction"; Transliteration: "Kagenuki" (Japanese: 影抜き)	January 12, 2008
Shin, his Persona awakened, nearly escapes death when a mysterious person pursued him with her Persona. Yumi Tasaka's rescue by Ryo, as well as the emergence of Shin's Persona, forces the men seemingly responsible for the Shadow killings to make plans to kill Ryo and Shin before the two are able to use their Personas against them. Shin and Jun head to their respective schools, the former making friends with Takuro and Megumi. During a Shadow Pull, Takuro's Persona emerges with Shin's for a second time. Shin gets invited to a karaoke night with Megumi, Takuro and Kanaru, but the girls are attacked by thugs after they leave for the restroom.
3	"Marebito"; Transliteration: "Marebito" (Japanese: マレビト)	January 19, 2008
Shin, Takuro and Kanaru are summoned by Ayanagi Police regarding that karaoke incident. While Jun gets a visit from Eiko Nikaido, a Kanzato family friend, Shin is warned by Ryo that he should leave Ayanagi City alongside Jun as his situation to contain the mysterious killings were on the verge of becoming public through pressuring of his mysterious benefactors. The individuals supposedly known for the Persona killings attempted to assassinate both Ryo and Shin for good, but their attempts backfired as Ryo's Persona made short work of his assailant's Persona, killing him while Shin's Persona fought back until one of his attackers became incapacitated when his Persona had been combined with another.
4	"A Whale's Feather"; Transliteration: "Kujira no Hane" (Japanese: くじらのはね)	January 26, 2008
Detective Ito starts to tail Ryo in order to locate evidence behind the string of Reverse murder incidents in Ayanagi City as he was getting frustrated with making the details on the incident top secret. A rift starts to form between Shin and Ryo due to the latter's part in being cold towards his younger siblings. In the midst of this rift, Jun disappears and heads to Ayanagi Lake. Shin and Ryo were able to get Jun back safely when a Persona was summoned near the area, though Jun's had the form of his late twin sister, Yuki.
5	"A Forced Union"; Transliteration: "Shiirareta Ketsugō" (Japanese: 強いられた結合)	February 2, 2008
While Detective Ito decides to continue surveillance on Shin and his friends after their karaoke night, Shin goes with Jun after the latter insists on hearing voices from an unused concert hall. Shin's Persona fights with Sotaro's during their encounter. Jun, after seeing Shin fighting with Sotaro, had his Persona awakened as a result. The two retreated after Sotaro's injuries forced him to retreat. Shin continues to grow more distant from Ryo when he tells his young sibling to leave Ayanagi City for their own good. Takuro's Persona emerges in Naginomori High when Sotaro makes another appearance, taunting him about Okazaki's, a friend of Takuro's, death.
6	"The Day of the Chief's Disappearance"; Transliteration: "Shochō ga Kieta Hi" (Japanese: 署長が消えた日)	February 9, 2008
The Ayanagi Police is preparing for the annual "Chief for a Day" in which a famous idol is police chief for a day to lecture about the dangers of drunk driving. However, the idol scheduled to show up is unable to make it, but by an odd stroke of luck, Ito and Narasaki are able to convince Megumi and Kanaru to be the chiefs for the event. Meanwhile, Ryo, after responding to a fake Reverse incident, ends up in a bear suit and passing out balloons to children. Two of the boys he meets are targeted for ransom, but Ryo is able to beat up the kidnappers while still in the bear suit. Later, after Shin, Jun, and Takuro meet up with Megumi and Kanaru and are heading home, they pass the bear-suited Ryo, and then Shin, not knowing that it is his older brother in the bear suit, asks him for a light blue balloon.
7	"The Stranger Who is "Me""; Transliteration: "Watashi to Iu Tasha" (Japanese: 私という他者)	February 16, 2008
Shin, Jun, Megumi, Kanaru and Takuro alongside Yumi go to an inn in the outskirts of Ayanagi City for a break. During this time, Takuro tries to train himself to use his Persona. Megumi had reawakened her Persona after seeing Yumi grab a white feather from the top of the lighthouse, who almost died if Megumi's Persona didn't help her in saving Yumi. Meanwhile, Shin meets up with the mysterious woman after his Persona had attacked her in the beach.
8	"Under the Camphor Tree"; Transliteration: "Kusunoki no Shita de" (Japanese: クスノキの下で)	February 23, 2008
A long time friend of Kanaru transfers into the school, and along with her, mysterious and bizarre "pranks" start happening almost every night in the grounds. The group decides to investigate these incidents by going to the school at night. They divide into two teams: Shin, Jun and Kanaru, and Takuro and Megumi on the other. With the two older boys overly scared, the girls lead on to find Kanaru's friend collapsed on the floor of the science room. Meanwhile, Jun senses a troubled Persona nearby and disappears to the camphor tree on the school's yard, and uses his own to comfort it.
9	"Calling from the Sea"; Transliteration: "Umi kara no Yobigoe" (Japanese: 海からの呼び声)	March 1, 2008
Eiko invites Shin to go out with her as she investigate the abandoned Japanese Coast Guard Deep Submergence Vehicle. Eiko reveals to Shin how Ryo had felt guilty ever since he agreed to consent to a brain transfer for Jun, which explained the appearance of Yuki a few episodes earlier by Shin and Ryo. Eiko also tells Shin of a near death experience that she experienced in college as a nautical diver, and a vision of a light on the bottom of the ocean. In the midst of the investigation in the waters near the Ayanagi City coastline, the same feathers began to cover almost the entire sea. Shin once again encounters the mysterious woman in a dream, trying to reach out to him.
10	"The Shadow Smiles at the Dusk"; Transliteration: "Kage wa Hakubo ni Warau" (Japanese: 影は薄暮に微笑う)	March 8, 2008
While Shin goes on a trip with Eiko, Takuro goes to train his Persona with Megumi. Meanwhile, Ryo and Jun get together with Mayuri to see a movie. Mayuri later confronts Ryo in an overpass, but were confronted by Toma, who was seen to be alive. Ryo and Toma's Persona engage each other in combat, with the latter forced to get away before seeing the mysterious red-haired girl and some whale feathers. Ryo heads down to the coroner's office to see Eiko and despite his earlier battle with Toma, confirms his dead body.
11	"Definition of Dependence"; Transliteration: "Izon no Teigi" (Japanese: 依存の定義)	March 15, 2008
Shin, Takuro, and Megumi bust up a shadow extraction group only to find out that Kanaru is the leader of the group. After a talk, it becomes obvious that she's addicted to shadow extractions and they try convincing her to quit, including Shin beating up the people she was going to meet before she gets there. They then do a sleep over to try to keep her from going out. Toru reveals some information that he knew several other Persona users. After she agrees to another shadow extraction, Shin breaks it up by scaring the other boys off with his Persona. Depressed because Kanaru gave up, Mayuri offers to do it to her. Kanaru refuses and goes and hides in the park. Shin runs into Mayuri and she leads him to her. He goes into the place she's hiding in and then after he says he will wait outside for her till she calms down. Kanaru freaks out and Shin rushes in to help her. Shin holds onto Kanaru and as the others arrive, they are lifted into the sky by a large bubble of purple Persona-like energy.
12	"The Savior"; Transliteration: "Kyūsaisha" (Japanese: 救済者)	March 22, 2008
Ryo visits Yumi in the Ayanagi City Hospital with Shin speaking to him about his reasons why he was there. Eiko speaks up with Ito regarding her concerns of Ryo that he may be hiding some details on the Apathy Syndrome cases. Later on, Ryo meets up with Keisuke Komatsubara aka Mariya Kudou in the Ayanagi bridge, warning him that he would like to take Ryo's Persona away from him. Meanwhile, Mariya informs the Marebito to conduct more surveillance of Shin and Jun back at Naginomori Gakuen High School.
13	"Crimson Snow"; Transliteration: "Shu ni Somaru Setsugen" (Japanese: 朱に染まる雪原)	March 29, 2008
Mariya kills the rogue Yuji in the midst of a parent-teacher conference in Nagimori Gakuen. Ito and Eiko team up to find out what Ryo is up to by planting a GPS device in his vehicle. Ryo later faces off against Mariya in the mountains outside of Ayanagi City. Despite being wounded by Mariya's Persona, Ryo was able to severely defeat his Pesona. Before Eiko could aid Ryo, his Persona sensed Eiko in the area and fired a beam shot through her chest, killing her. In the Kanzato residence, Jun had been able to sense Ryo and Eiko's plight.
14	"The Wandering Ravine"; Transliteration: "Hazama no Hōkō" (Japanese: 狭間の彷徨)	April 5, 2008
Shin visits the Ayanagi City Police Station to find out more about what happened to Ryo and Eiko after the media said the former was missing and the latter was said to be dead, leaving Shin heartbroken. Akihiko arrives in Ayanagi City and works to conceal information from both police and public about the Reverse Incidents. Sotaro meets with Shin without fighting. An unknown Persona user goes berserk after he ran out of suppressant pills, forcing his Persona to go wild by draining the lifeforce out of bystanders before a beam shot kills him. Shin sees Ryo in the sky with his Persona and white feathers, but he mysteriously disappears when the lights were restored during the rogue Persona's rampage in downtown Ayanagi.
15	"What Bounds Tomorrow"; Transliteration: "Ashita o Tozasu Mono" (Japanese: 明日を閉ざすもの)	April 12, 2008
Shin, still depressed over the disappearance of Ryo and Eiko, goes back to the old Kanzato residence to see Akihiko Sanada in the house. He, with Inui, informs Shin and the others Nagamori Gakuen students/Persona users on the truth behind the string of incidents dubbed by both police and the media as the "Reverse" Incidents with the reason on why the incidents were still taking place in Ayanagi City as of now.
16	"Child of Release and Holy Spirit of Healing"; Transliteration: "Kaihō no Ko to Chiyu no Seirei" (Japanese: 解放の子と治癒の聖霊)	April 19, 2008
Shin and Takuro, with Ito, get involved in a planned operation by Akihiko to take down the Marebitos. However, Shin and Takuro got their Personas pinned down by Sotaro and Udo's. Things became worse when Sotaro's persona wounds Jun by the shoulder by a beam shot in the shoulder. After Akihiko tends to Jun's wounds, Megumi assists them by taking refuge in her family home.
17	"At the Village of Wind"; Transliteration: "Kaze no Sato nite" (Japanese: 風の里にて)	April 26, 2008
While Jun recuperates from his shoulder wound, Megumi's memories of her abhorrence towards Personas were revealed. Her brother Tomoya died when her Persona was activated, leading to hatred from her mother. Megumi and her mom had a hard time mending their family ties until an accident with a trailer truck had Megumi activate her Persona to save her mother from drowning, resulting in their reconnection of their family bonds and ending her mom's hatred over Megumi.
18	"A Sinking Dream"; Transliteration: "Shizumu Yume" (Japanese: 沈む夢)	May 3, 2008
Jun starts to go out with Ayane, who is the mysterious girl in red who keeps appearing before Ryo and Shin. Shin decides to secretly follow the two to a local park, despite Kanaru participating in an all-English speech contest. Shin was then subjected to several visions by Ayane, including being forced to watch Eiko being brutally killed by Ryo's own Persona before Shin encounters a vision of Ryo's Persona and later fights with his own while seeing the white feathers again. Though Shin was alive later on when he wakes up in grassy field, he encounters Jun with Yuki's voice.
19	"The Returnees"; Transliteration: "Kikansha" (Japanese: 帰還者)	May 10, 2008
While taking a break from watching Megumi do a hip hop dance routine, Takuro spots someone who appears to be his father from the beach. Inui tells Shin and the others that the people who reemerge from their disappearance due to the Apathy Crisis had returned with either different souls or bodies. During this time, Takuro and his father try to reconcile their differences after the latter had disappeared, forcing a burden on his son and the rest of his family.
20	"Memory"; Transliteration: "Omoide" (Japanese: おもいで)	May 17, 2008
Shin meets up with Jun, only for him to notice that Yuki is the one currently inhabiting his body when she tells her brother that Ryo and Jun are still alive in another world. An investigation to the Kanzato residence led by Akihiko reveals to Shin the nature of his parents' true work. Meanwhile, Yuki is kidnapped by Saki and Kanaru's Persona is activated, which delays Narasaki's pursuit to rescue Jun.
21	"Brutality"; Transliteration: "Zankoku" (Japanese: 残刻)	May 24, 2008
Narasaki is affected by the Apathy Syndrome, forcing everyone including Akihiko to start making preparations to locate the Marebito hideout with Jun's abduction under their watch. Mariya is resurrected after Jun becomes unconscious to control their Persona. Most of the surviving Marebito's Persona were starting to get berserk due to the lack of suppression medication required. Meanwhile, Shin encounters Hiiragi, who was involved in Mariya's research on Personas and reveals to him the true reason for the nature of their work and why his parents left them in the first place.
22	"The Possessed"; Transliteration: "Yorishiro" (Japanese: 依り代)	May 31, 2008
While Ito and Akihiko are ordered not to get involved with the Marebito, Shin, Takuro and Megumi trek to the Marebito's hideout in the mountains and do battle with the Personas belonging to Mariya and Ayane. Jun/Yuki's reawakend Persona, along with Kanaru's, are able to even the odds in Shin's favor and defeat Ayane's for good, but almost everyone lost consciousness. In a vision, Jun tells Shin goodbye. In a distance, Shin sees Ryo in a harbor.
23	"Embracing the Tie"; Transliteration: "Kizuna o Idaite" (Japanese: 絆を抱いて)	June 7, 2008
Shin, Kanaru, Takuro and Megumi are rescued from the Marebito hideout when a raid is launched. Kanaru reveals to Megumi that she was a cyborg planted by the Marebito and made by Mariya in order to locate students who had the potential in summoning Personas. Shin spends the late afternoon with Kanaru, but when snow begins to fall on Ayanagi City, Shin receives a phone call and finds out the truth about Kanaru. Shin then finds out that she had collapsed and cradles her in his arms.
24	"A Wedge of Atonement"; Transliteration: "Shokuzai no Kusabi" (Japanese: 贖罪の楔)	June 14, 2008
A flashback episode that reveals Ayane as the culprit for the Ayanagi City disaster when she confronted Ryo and his parents before she summoned her Persona. Shin and Ryo had earlier summoned their Personas in their youth when Ayane's Persona had killed their parents, which caused Shin to suppress his memories of the disaster. The whale feathers were then dispersed throughout the city when Shin's Persona killed Ayane's. Back in the present time, Kanaru is buried alongside the other civilians who were killed ten years ago.
25	"The Groundless Loss"; Transliteration: "Iwarenaki Sōshitsu" (Japanese: 謂れなき喪失)	June 21, 2008
Shin, Takuro and Megumi reflect on Kanaru's death and the crisis that took place in Ayanagi City. Inui is injured when Ayane revives her clone and uses its Persona to disable Nakamura and his staff members as it head towards the city. While Akihiko tries to stop the clone, Ryo confronts him and warns him to back off.
26	"Surfaced Future"; Transliteration: "Fujō suru Mirai" (Japanese: 浮上する未来)	June 28, 2008
Shin tries to confront Ryo over Jun, but he tells his younger brother to stay. Later on, Shin encounters Ayane's clone and fights off her multiple Personas with backup from Takuro and Megumi. Ryo too joins in after he clashes with Shin over the plan to destroy all Personas, and Shin soon prevails. Jun and Ryo are recovered, saving themselves and Ayanagi city though the latter never fully recovered from his coma and dies in Shin's arms. Later, Megumi and Shin move schools in another city with Takuro taking over the store as the manager, and Jun stays in Ayanagi at Naganomori Gakuen's dormitories.
