= List of Birdy the Mighty: Decode episodes =

Birdy the Mighty: Decode DVD, Volume 1.

The following is a list of episodes for Birdy the Mighty: Decode, which was produced by A-1 Pictures and aired on various Japanese television stations from July to September 2008. The show was licensed to North America by FUNIMATION, scheduled for release in 2010. A second season aired from January to March 2009.

Birdy the Mighty: Decode was first announced under the name Birdy the Movement. It was then revealed in the Tokyo International Anime Fair that the show would be aired in the summer as Birdy the Mighty: Decode. A trailer for Birdy the Mighty Decode was announced on its official website.

== Episodes ==
=== Birdy the Mighty: Decode ===
Birdy the Mighty: Decode starts when Birdy secretly entered Earth to track down an alien criminal named Geega as an Earth Federation police officer. In the midst of her work, she accidentally kills a Japanese national named Senkawa Tsutomu. To save his life, Birdy merges her body with his.

As the two work together on maintaining their lives, a mysterious person wishes to uses the Ryunka in order to commit genocide on the entire Earth.

This season uses two musical themes: one opening and one ending. The opening theme is "Sora" by Hearts Grow, while the ending theme is "Let's Go Together" by Afromania

No.	Title	Original release date
1	"One Plus One"	4 July 2008
While pursuing alien criminals named Bacillus and Geega, Birdy Cephon Altera and Tuto infiltrate Earth under the cover of a rising Japanese idol and her manager. During one night on a routine mission to apprehend one of the criminals, a civilian named Tsutomu Senkawa, due to being in the wrong place at the wrong time, is used as a human shield. When Birdy realizes that she has accidentally fatally wounded him, she decides that the only way to save his life is to share a body with him in order to keep his consciousness alive. Tsutomu thought that it was all a dream until he found that he was unable to control his body one night after he was supposedly dead.
2	"The Partnered One"	11 July 2008
Birdy and Tsutomu try to cope with existing by sharing one body, but leading two separate lives. Birdy's commanding officer, Magius, informs Tsutomu that his original body is being restored and it will be some time before he can live outside of Birdy's body. Bacillus tries to eliminate Birdy by luring her into a movie shooting as cover. Keisuke Muroto tries to take photos of Bacillus and Birdy, but falls unconscious when he was knocked out by debris. A wounded Bacillus took over Geega's Earth body as his first one was damaged from deterioration and from fighting Birdy.
3	"View of Life"	18 July 2008
Bacillus tries to locate and eliminate Birdy, while she, Tsutomu and Tuto argue over the constant separate lives that they were trying to hide from the public. Tuto gets wounded by Bacillus before he gave Birdy an Elemental Destructor capsule bomb to kill Bacillus and eliminate the threat of him killing an Earth-born civilian in Japan. Birdy mourns Tuto's death when he can't heal his wounds from Bacillus' attack.
4	"A Stranger from Earth"	25 July 2008
Birdy returns to her home planet Altaria to attend a trial of one of the smugglers that she had arrested. She and Tsutomu were questioned by a deity named Nechla Geeze regarding Ryunka. Nejula reveals to Tsutomu that Ryunka is used as a nuclear weapon, killing off the inhabitants of a planet named Bilugema. While Birdy visits her hometown, a terrorist bombing destroys a convoy of vehicles.
5	"Another World"	1 August 2008
Birdy fights with Kinzel Hower as Nechla corners Bay Gelabu Bela, to which he ultimately commits suicide for his "pride" or "honor." Birdy is able to convince Nimukay Bow to detonate the falling satellite which was targeting the Union, after knowing that many people will die from the attack. Kashu Geeze turns out to be an undercover agent under Skeletso's direction. Birdy is quite frustrated with the fact that Skeletso tolerated the deaths of many Altarians in the terrorist attack in order to get a lead on Kinzel.
6	"Both of Us"	8 August 2008
Sayaka Nakasugi invites her classmates to her mansion for her welcome back party. Birdy investigates the site where she had killed Tsutomu in order to locate a marionette of non-Earth origin. Sayaka's maid, Yoshie Suzuki, finds strange things have happened to her, which started to worry Sayaka's grandfather, Chairman Katsutoshi Nakasugi. Meanwhile, Sayaka disappears from the mansion after encountering a parrot, which is later recognized as an alien in disguise.
7	"Night Walker"	15 August 2008
A string of murders with dead female victims with short hair and glasses leads Birdy to investigate them with Tsutomu. The culprit is revealed to be a rogue combat marionette, which is killing the victims through a loving "hug" that is unfortunately fatal because of its super-strength. They are targeted based on their similarities to its "mother", the main programmer when the marionette was placed under her care. Birdy attempts to retrieve it, but is attacked by supposedly a Federation-based person with a guardian robot that attacks her to keep her away from acquiring the disabled robot.
8	"Ghost Village"	22 August 2008
Sayaka invites her friends including Tsutomu to her family village in the Sawajiri Village in Nagano. But on one evening, Sayaka succumbs to the Ryunka implanted on her by an unknown force who returned the renegade marionette back to her owners. A small number of Ryunka explosions rattled the village, forcing the Federation Police to mobilize.
9	"The Champion of Justice"	29 August 2008
An investigation team under Satyajit Shyamalan's orders investigates the ruins of Sawajiri Village, even killing a policeman when Muroto and Natsumi Hayamiya decide to investigate. Birdy saves them from some of the armed men and fights the reconstructed marionette before she gets injured during an encounter with Georg Gomez after defeating the marionette again.
10	"You're the One"	5 September 2008
Tsutomu and Sayaka go on a date, to which Tsutomu receives a kiss from Sayaka herself. Meanwhile, Shyamalan meets with Chairman Nakasugi and kills him during the meeting. When Yoshie discovers his body, she thinks that Sayaka killed him. This, in turn, activates the Ryunka within Sayaka, as she causes Yoshie to evaporate.
11	"Bye Bye Buddy"	12 September 2008
Birdy confirms that Sayaka is the host for Ryunka. But Tsutomu wants to protect her, no matter what and so he takes control of Birdy's body when she tries to get close to Ryunka. Nechla knocks them out before their minds fuse completely. When they wake up again, Tsutomu has his own body back and needs glasses again. From now on, Birdy and Tsutomu go separate ways. When Birdy and Nechla arrive at Sayaka's villa, she is already gone because she went to Tsutomu's place. To protect her from being pursued by her greedy relatives, Tsutomu leaves her in Shyamalan's care. However, Tsutomu eventually discovers Shyamalan's true intentions when Nechla confronts him.
12	"Doomsday"	19 September 2008
Shyamalan releases a recorded television announcement, saying that he intends to wreck genocide on Japan to weed out the weak. The government, though slow, has begun to take steps to contain the Ryunka that is beginning to spread throughout the Greater Tokyo Area. Tsutomu, though advised not to go out of his house, decides to do so and save Sayaka. Nechla suggests that a faction of the Federation Police may have not decided to quickly respond to see the power of Ryunka. Muroto decides to help Tsutomu after he finds out that the ship is the Lost Bird, where Sayaka is held. Shyamalan is killed when the Ryunka inside of Sayaka is activated, with a segment of the Japanese public. Meanwhile, Birdy is moving in on her own to stop the Lost Bird from moving any further.
13	"Stand by Me"	26 September 2008
Birdy and Tsutomu head to the Lost Bird to figure out a way to purge the Ryunka out of Sayaka's body. The two were able to do so, at the cost of Tsutomu's own body when he sacrificed it to allow Birdy to fatally wound him again and purge the Ryunka parasite out of his body with Nechla in charge of containing it. The Japanese government had covered up the events as the Federation Police had mobilized in Roppongi. Due to the events, Sayaka loses some of her memories including her encounters with Tsutomu. Birdy once again merges with Tsutomu until a new body can be readied. Meanwhile, Gomez and his boss, Christella Revi, had a conversation about whether Birdy is a threat, with Gomez telling Revi to take some precautions against her.

=== Birdy the Mighty: Decode 02 ===
Season 2 starts a few months after Shyamalan was killed while attempting to use Ryunka to kill everyone on Earth starting in Japan, Senkawa and Birdy are still attempting to maintain their dual lives until space criminals connected to the Ryunka case escape from Federation police custody.

The opening theme for this season is "kiseki" by NIRGILIS, while the ending theme is "Tane" by no3b.

No.	Title	Original release date
0	"Cipher: Between You and Me"	28 May 2009 (direct-to-video)
A story that connects part 1 and 2.
1	"After All"	9 January 2009
Birdy is informed of a breakout from an intergalactic prison, and manages to track down one of the rogue prisoners. Although she is ordered to apprehend the criminals alive, he was killed by the time she arrived on the scene. The only clue is a disguise chip, which dissolved the body.
2	"Simple Twist of Fate"	16 January 2009
Birdy meets up with her childhood friend, Nataru, and they talk for a bit. They are interrupted by a girl in a wheelchair, named Shoko Kagami, who treats Birdy coldly. A second of the criminals is tracked down, and she pursues him for a bit, but he escapes only to be killed in a violent manner Birdy is not familiar with.
3	"Somewhere in time"	23 January 2009
Tsutomu and the journalism club go investigate a refugee camp. While Hayamiya is just trying to get a good story, Birdy is hoping to get a lead on another alien living in the camp. Two young children, Takumi and Marina, give the club a tour of the camp. They run away into the ruins so that they don't have to be separated, but get attacked by a group of thugs. Nataru, volunteering at the camp, goes after the children, but isn't strong enough on his own. Birdy arrives to rescue him.
4	"Tears Are Not Enough"	30 January 2009
Birdy tracks down the illegal Virtual Reactor Chips purchaser, who is Nataru's father, named Dusk. Dusk reveals he is a member of an Alterian freedom group, and that he helped disguise the escapees. Birdy goes after the nearest, but the escapees kidnap Dusk and interrogate him on the attacks on their number. He is murdered, which angers Nataru and upsets Birdy. Nataru kills another of the escapees, but not before learning Valic killed his father. Birdy promises to catch Dusk's killer.
5	"Before It's Too Late"	6 February 2009
Irma, Birdy's contact on Earth for information, is kidnapped by the escapees to lure her into a trap. She escapes being nearly killed by a long-range gun and fights to a draw. She collapses before she enters the portal to her ship, however. Tsutomu has a weird dream, a blend between his own memories and Birdy's. This is when he discovers he is trapped in Birdy's body. He is thus forced to follow her schedule, including a signing some of his classmates attend, a photo shoot and a reality contest where he has to eat bugs. At the end, he learns that personality merging has begun.
6	"A Prisoner of the Past"	13 February 2009
In an attempt to reverse the personality merging process, Tsutomu delves into Birdy's past. In this episode, he learns what it means to be an Iksiola, and how Birdy met Nataru.
7	"We Will Meet Again"	20 February 2009
Continuing the memory dive, Tsutomu learns more of the Central Tower attack and Birdy's part within it.
8	"Falling In Love With Love"	27 February 2009
Shoko catches Nataru and Birdy in an embrace, although only because of Birdy's clumsiness. As a result, she runs off out of the hospital, calling Nataru to come find her. But when she sees Birdy with him, she keeps running off. At the end of the episode, Nataru is shot.
9	"Space, Time, and You"	6 March 2009
Nataru jumps through time to just before he was shot, and manages to disarm and chase off Moss, injuring her in the process. She uses the injury to gain entrance to where Nataru works in the hospital, again trying to kill him. Nataru jumps through time, ending up a few days ahead of the event, his eyes turning red and bleeding in the process. Muroto finds him and takes him in. Nataru then asks Birdy to retrieve his medicine from his old apartment, and she discovers the blood from the fight.
10	"It Never Entered My Mind"	13 March 2009
The remaining escapees steal a nuclear weapon from an American navy ship, and afterward Tesera tells them she will not contact them and wishes to remain as a human. Capella is taken by Kashu after Irma convinces her to give up without a fight. Later, Nataru discovers a picture in Muroto's room of Tesera, and goes off to find and kill her. Muroto calls Birdy, and she finds Nataru just after he brutally murdered Tesera. She allows him to leave, and berates herself afterward.
11	"Both Sides Now"	20 March 2009
The school festival opens where Hayamiya gives her piece on the disaster refugees. Nataru finds and severely wounds Gatol before he and Moss escapes. Hoping to cut a deal with Revi, Moss kills him but is rejected and decides to fight Nataru, for all or nothing.
12	"Before Long"	27 March 2009
Nataru and Moss fight, however Moss is nearly killed before being rescued by Birdy who attempts to convince Nataru to surrender and receive treatment before his Iksiola state kills him. He refuses and nearly kills Birdy before Senkawa switches in and convinces Nataru that being an Iksiola means more than just killing. Realizing his error, Nataru relents and he and Birdy kiss. Nataru jumps back in time to the moment of the tower attack becoming the man who saves a young Birdy via a time-loop. Birdy as Shion meets up with Shoko and gives her a present from Nataru while Birdy eagerly waits for his return.

== See also ==
- Birdy the Mighty
