= List of Telepathy Shōjo Ran episodes =

The following is the list of episodes of the Japanese anime Telepathy Shōjo Ran produced by TMS Entertainment. The anime is the 2008 adaptation of the novel Telepathy Shōjo Ran Jiken Note. The anime aired from June 21 to December 20, 2008, except for a break on August 9. It ran for a total of 26 episodes. The anime features an opening theme song "Aoi Kakera" (青いかけら) by Chara, and an ending theme song "Polaris no Namida" (ポラリスの涙) by Onso9line.

== Episode list ==
No.	Title	Original release date
1	"Ran, Telepathy! Searching the Town"; Transliteration: "Ran, Terepashī! ~Nerawareta Machi~" (Japanese: 蘭, テレパシー! 〜ねらわれた街〜)	June 21, 2008
Ran Isozaki is a young girl entering junior-high school with her childhood friend Rui Ayase. Ran starts hearing the voice of a mysterious girl one day of various warnings. Strange events start happening around town, and Ran tells Rui about the voice she hears. Rui is not surprised as he recounts another occasion when it was obvious Ran could hear voices and it is explained why Ran has two cats at home (a younger Ran discovering two abandoned kittens in the park). In addition to the voice, Ran sees images of the girl's childhood and her mother calling her a freak before abandoning her. At school, Ran's nice home-room teacher Momoko Ōhara introduces the mysterious girl as a transfer student named Midori Naha. Taking the vacant seat at the back, Midori telepathically tells Ran that making friends is a waste of time. Midori begins to test Ran's abilities, and ends up remonstrating with her, revealing Ran's powers of telekinesis in the process. They both also discover that Rui has the ability to stay Ran's unrefined powers.
2	"Ran, Run! Searching the Town"; Transliteration: "Ran, Hashiru! ~Nerawareta Machi~" (Japanese: 蘭, 走る! 〜ねらわれた街〜)	June 28, 2008
Even while completely unprepared for a test, Ran answers all the questions right, making her friend Saeko both astonished and anguished. As she pursues Saeko, Ran unknowingly hears her internal voice and attempts to explain the test. Unfortunately, Ran's explanation prompts the frightened Saeko (who had not yet vocalized her thoughts) to call her a freak for reading her mind. Midori continues her telepathic exchanges with Ran and warnings to her about what will happen if her powers are discovered. Saeko is silently abducted from the school library, and Ran is surprised that she still cannot hear Rui's thoughts. Ran and Rui are disrupted by a controlled dog attacking the pair, and Rui grabs the controller's her arm which amplifies Ran's powers so much that they stun the dog and break the control. Ran's pursuit of the masked figure onto the bridge prompts an encounter with Midori who taunts Ran with warnings that she will be called a monster by others. After Ran retorts that Rui still likes her even with her telepathic powers, Midori is taken aback and flees. As Ran's brother Rin is priding himself on partially solving the mysterious cases plaguing the town (external mind control being the common thread), Ran somehow detects Rui's successful abduction and races to his aid with Rin in tow.
3	"Ran, Jump! Searching the Town"; Transliteration: "Ran, Tobu! ~Nerawareta Machi~" (Japanese: 蘭, 跳ぶ! 〜ねらわれた街〜)	July 5, 2008
Ran and her brother Rin head to the school after Ran picks up Rui's stray thoughts at his home. Rin finds the culprit on the roof with an unconscious Rui. A brief battle ensues, and Midori interferes in the fight, prompting the masked figure to invade Midori's mind. Midori's telekinetic counterattack backfires and throws her from the rooftop but Ran interferes, saving her life. Again seeing Midori's memory of her mother's rejection, Ran vows to become her friend and save her from isolation. After hauling Midori to safety, Ran's charge at the masked figure knocks her to the ground and revealing her identity. Letting her mind slip for a moment, the woman reveals that the man in the earlier fire was a former lover whose desertion drove her to revenge. Rui awakening and calling to her enables Ran to use her now enhanced power to fight back and drive her away. Midori thanks Ran for saving her from the same fate as the woman.
4	"Ran, The Flowers Call: From the Darkness of a Whisper"; Transliteration: "Ran o Yobu Hana ~Yami kara no Sasayaki~" (Japanese: 蘭を呼ぶ花 〜闇からのささやき〜)	July 12, 2008
At an utter loss for how to spend their Golden Week vacation, Rui proposes that Hayate Village be visited in order to investigate the legend of a local sorceress wielding the Emahi grass for the purpose of controlling people. Ran receives images from someone in the town of an unresolved injustice. Ran, Rui, and Midori accompany Ran's father and brother to the village. Once there, strange things happen such as villagers coming to attack Ran, Rui and Midori. As Ran and Rui are out looking for more clues, Midori stays behind. A man comes by looking for Ronpei's (Ran's father) friend Takizawa, but he's out with Ran and the others. Ran continues to hear voices as the man from earlier gets into a car accident not far from the house. Midori warns Ran to be careful as the village is very dangerous.
5	"Ran, Calling the Wind: From the Darkness of a Whisper"; Transliteration: "Ran ga Yobu Kaze ~Yami kara no Sasayaki~" (Japanese: 蘭が呼ぶ風 〜闇からのささやき〜)	July 19, 2008
Ran and the others find the Emahi grass they were looking for, and Ran almost gets into an accident. The man who got in the car accident, Nakai, goes to the hospital, and Ran, Rui, and Midori go to his room to ask him questions. They find clues in his belongings and discover their old teacher Ōhara is in the center of the recent strange occurrences. Ran hears the voices from the Emahi grass and goes into the forest with the others in tow. Midori is attacked by the grass and nearly dies, but Ran unexpectedly uses her power to save Midori. Afterwards, the Emahi grass wilts and disappears; their teacher leaves shortly after.
6	"Ran, The Ghost of the Hot Springs: Ghost Hotel Riddle"; Transliteration: "Ran, Yūrei Onsen ni Iku ~Gōsuto-kan no Nazo~" (Japanese: 蘭, 幽霊温泉に行く 〜ゴースト館の謎〜)	July 26, 2008
After hearing reports of a haunted inn, Rin goes with Ran, Rui, and Midori to the inn to investigate the rumors. The manager of the inn seeks the help of Ran to get rid of the ghosts. Midori uses her powers to see the memories of the manager, and learns more about a man that died a couple months ago. A man is coming to buy the inn from him and his mother tomorrow, but he does not want to sell. Midori and Ran continue to investigate the ghosts, and find clues of how someone could make people think ghosts were around due to hidden passages near the outdoor bath. While there, they actually do see a couple ghosts, however.
7	"Ran and the Hot Springs Ghost Case: Ghost Hotel Riddle"; Transliteration: "Ran to Yukemuri Yūrei Jiken ~Gōsuto-kan no Nazo~" (Japanese: 蘭と湯けむり幽霊事件 〜ゴースト館の謎〜)	August 2, 2008
Ran and the others continue to investigate the ghosts and gain access to the detached wing where the old man died a couple months back. Rui uncovers several clues as to what actually happened. When the man, Shiroyama, comes to buy the inn, Midori and Rui lead in trying to uncover his involvement in the death. Ultimately, they find out how he was behind the man's death, and he's taken away by the police. The ghost rumors of the inn fade away shortly after.
8	"Ran, Great Relationship Operation"; Transliteration: "Ran no Nakayoshi Daisakusen" (Japanese: 蘭のなかよし大作戦)	August 16, 2008
Ran is excited about being with Rui over the summer, and on the way home from school accidentally runs into a girl from her school; Ran sees some of her memories in the process, making Ran concerned about her. It turns out the girl will be moving away soon. Ran's classmate Yamashita receives a letter which is read by a couple bullies in class. Yamashita tears up the letter without reading it himself. Ran pieces together the letter and gives it back to Yamashita. Using her powers, Ran learns about his relationship with the girl from before. Ran and Midori use their powers to interfere further by manipulating a doll in Yamashita's home and try to push him to do something before the girl moves away. This drives him to seek her out that night and properly says goodbye.
9	"Ran, Finding God: Ran, Spring and the Cherry Blossoms in Full Bloom"; Transliteration: "Ran, Kami-sama o Hirō ~Ran to Sakura to Haru-ranman~" (Japanese: 蘭, 神様をひろう 〜蘭と桜と春爛漫〜)	August 23, 2008
Ran goes out with Rui and Midori (against her previous wishes) and the three find a traveler's deity in a hidden path after Ran and Rui fall down a small embankment. Ran hears a voice from the statue, prompting the three to research the things he, Iratsuko Kashiwaba, talks about regarding the sakura of Onju. Iratsuko wants to meet a girl there, Iratsume. They go to the library and meet an old man who tells them the sakura of Onju is actually close to the library. The three leave and find the sakura of Onju's tree stump. After placing the statue down, Ran, Rui and Midori witness the reunion of Iratsuko and Iratsume.
10	"Ran and Midori and Summer Vacation"; Transliteration: "Ran to Midori to Natsuyasumi" (Japanese: 蘭と翠と夏休み)	August 30, 2008
Ran goes out on her normal morning run and runs into Midori; Ran invites her to the town's summer festival, but she does not want to go if Rin will not be there. Ran and Rui go out together to buy Ran a new kimono, and while out Ran tries to phone Midori several times to try to get her to come to the festival later, but Midori's been out all day. When she gets home, Midori listens to Ran's humorous messages and unexpectedly meets up with Ran at the festival later when the fireworks are going off.
11	"Ran and the Lost Village: The Skull Knew"; Transliteration: "Ran to Ushinawareta Mura ~Sharekōbe wa Shitteita~" (Japanese: 蘭と失われた村 〜髑髏は知っていた〜)	September 6, 2008
Ran, Rui and Midori get involved with Rin's classmate Reika when they find out her brother has gone missing. They investigate into it and go to the town where he was last seen. While there, they learn about the legend of Three Caches, a village inhabited by the Three Eyes Clan known for their savageness. Ran and Midori gain access into an old man's home to ask him about Reika's brother, but he does not give them information even though Reika's brother left behind a note with the man's name on it. That night, Reika is abducted by the old man's men in the middle of the night, and Ran is knocked unconscious via chloroform and taken away somewhere.
12	"Ran and the Tears of the Third Eyes: The Skull Knew"; Transliteration: "Ran to Mitsume no Namida ~Sharekōbe wa Shitteita~" (Japanese: 蘭と三つ目の涙 〜髑髏は知っていた〜)	September 13, 2008
Ran and the others go to find Reika and Ran leading them to the Three Eyes Shrine. Rin uses his brute force to distract the enemies while Ran and Midori go and find Reika. After finding the man with Reika, they find he abducted her due to her resemblance to his daughter that died years ago. The man tries to kill himself by falling off the cliff, but Reika unconsciously uses physic powers to save him. The man is later arrested for bribery and an accessory to murder.
13	"Ran and a Mysterious Guide: Laughing Face of the Night"; Transliteration: "Ran to Nazo no Annai-nin ~Jinmensō wa Yoru Warau~" (Japanese: 蘭と謎の案内人 〜人面瘡は夜笑う〜)	September 20, 2008
While visiting Midori in the hospital for stomach pains after overeating, Ran sees a ghost girl that the others cannot which leads them into a room with an injured man named Tatsuhiko. Ran and Midori find a mark of a face on his elbow and use their powers to learn more about the suffering of an unknown girl. Once back home, they meet another injured man with amnesia who is somehow connected to Tatsuhiko. They go with the man to the only place he remembers, Kitōgami House. Ran and the others meet those that know him, and reveal that the man, Maruzō, is a doctor employed by the family. Ran and Midori inquire about the face mark they saw earlier, and later find the same mark on the granddaughter, Yuri, of the head of the house.
14	"Ran and the Red Handball: Laughing Face of the Night"; Transliteration: "Ran to Akai Temari ~Jinmensō wa Yoru Warau~" (Japanese: 蘭と赤い手鞠 〜人面瘡は夜笑う〜)	September 27, 2008
Maruzō goes missing, and Ran and the others learn more about the face mark as they continue their investigations. The head of the Kitōgami House had an older sister, Yumi, which had the visage scab of the face as well. It turns out that the visage scab on Yuri is fake, and two members of the house had stole 100 million yen and used the house as a hiding place. Ran and the others are tied up and left for dead after the culprits light the house on fire, but Ran and Midori use their powers in conjunction with Yumi's ghost to save everyone. The culprits are apprehended in the end.
15	"Rui, Disappearing Into Darkness: SOS Through Time"; Transliteration: "Rui, Yami ni Kieru ~Toki o Koeru SOS~" (Japanese: 留衣, 闇に消える 〜時を超えるSOS〜)	October 4, 2008
Ran goes out with Rui to a flea market, and Midori unexpectedly shows up. Rui disappears after receiving an old box from one of the sellers and opening it to find a comb. Rui is transported back in time to help a girl named O-Ran. Rui's unexpected appearance in the past, plus the comb he had pegs him for a thief, but he manages to feign amnesia. Rui learns about O-Ran's older sister who had disappeared. It turns out O-Ran's father was a comb maker before he died. Meanwhile, Ran and Midori try to find the man who gave the box to Rui.
16	"Rui, in the Edo Period: SOS Through Time"; Transliteration: "Rui, Edo Jidai ~Toki o Koeru SOS~" (Japanese: 留衣, 江戸時代 〜時を超えるSOS〜)	October 11, 2008
Ran and the others find the man who gave the box to Rui, and Ran and Midori find a time portal in his store house which they use to travel back in time to be with Rui. Rui uncovers an undercover law enforcer working where Rui is being held, and enlists his help to find O-Ran who went missing. After finding her, they also uncover that the proprietor, Kichibee Narukoya, has been breeding strange bugs called darkness demons and selling them in combs for a fortune. Naruyoya tries to have them killed, but Ran and Midori use their powers to escape. Ran and Midori lend their powers to Rui, and they destroy the darkness demon possessing Narukoya. Ran, Rui and Midori travel back to their own time with the help of the two combs.
17	"Ran, on Vacation: The Kidnapped Bride"; Transliteration: "Ran, Bakansu! ~Sarawareta Hanayome~" (Japanese: 蘭, バカンス! 〜さらわれた花嫁〜)	October 18, 2008
Ran, Rui, Midori, and Rin win a trip to a tropical island named Janome Island, or otherwise known as Snake Island. After stepping off the plane, Ran sees a snake coiled around one of the men on the plane over, Kenzo Akaza, whose great-grandfather had originally charted the island. Once they get to the hotel, Rui reveals more about he knows of the island, and the group goes out later to watch the sunset, where Ran hears intense voices again.
18	"Ran and Holy Ground and Flowers of Invitation: The Kidnapped Bride"; Transliteration: "Ran to Seichi to Sasoibana ~Sarawareta Hanayome~" (Japanese: 蘭と聖地と誘い花 〜さらわれた花嫁〜)	October 25, 2008
Ran is led against her will into the jungle, and comes across a bull owned by an old man named Jikunan who is connected to what has happened on the island in the past. Ran and the others go back to the hotel and the gang uncovers more clues before Rin is attacked from behind. Ran continues to hear strange voices and see visions, and Ran again against her will goes into the jungle to a waterfall, the place where one's wish is meant to be granted. Kenzo follows to get his wish granted, but is stopped. The two snake spirits of the island who had guided Ran appear and Jikunan wishes for Kenzo's life to be saved which brings prosperity to the island. Ran and the others leave the island soon after.
19	"Ran, Café cum Haunted House"; Transliteration: "Ran, Kafe do Obake Yashiki" (Japanese: 蘭, カフェ･ド･オバケ屋敷)	November 1, 2008
Ran's school is busy preparing for the school festival, and her class decides to do a haunted café. Midori comes over for dinner, and hears of how Ran's parents met in high school and fell in love. Midori is still haunted by her past with her family calling her a freak for having strange powers, and goes back home depressed. At school, Midori dresses up like Medusa, and is complimented by her classmates. The haunted café turns out to be a success, and even Rin, and Ran's parents come. While there, an accident happens and Ran's parents finally find out about her powers. Ran's parents reassure her and Midori that even though they are different, they are still loved.
20	"Rin, A Challenge For Power!"; Transliteration: "Rin, Chōnōryoku ni Chōsen!" (Japanese: 凛, 超能力に挑戦!)	November 8, 2008
Rin, due to his sister having powers, try to bring his own powers out with her help, but nothing works. Rin receives a love letter in his judo club's locker, but it unexpectedly goes missing later. Rin searches his club mates' bags, but finds nothing. After some deliberation, Rin concludes that Midori must have taken it, and she is found out to be the culprit. After Rin gets the letter back and reads it, he finds it to be addressed to a member of the sumo club.
21	"Midori and the Old Lady's Dream"; Transliteration: "Midori to Obaasan no Yume" (Japanese: 翠とおばあさんの夢)	November 15, 2008
On the way home from school, Rui, Ran and Midori held an old woman after she gets almost hit by a cyclist, but she does not want their help. They still follow her to the hospital and make sure she gets back fine. Midori meets the woman after she sneaks out of the hospital the next day, and Midori finds out that the woman has a granddaughter who has similar psychic powers to her. Midori comes to visit the woman later and helps her escape out to a hill in town. There, the woman finds out about Midori's powers, and Midori plays her violin for her while she sings.
22	"Ran and the White Girl"; Transliteration: "Ran to Shiroi Shōjo" (Japanese: 蘭と白い少女)	November 22, 2008
Ran, Rui, Midori, and Rin go to the mountains for a skiing, and in Midori's case snowboarding, trip so that they can investigate into the local rumor that a yuki-onna has been seen. Ran hears a voice at night, and she leaves with Midori to find the source. They meet a woman named Noriko looking for a villa she used to visit as a child, but is having trouble finding. After they find the villa, Noriko recalls memories of her past while at the villa with her father. Ran sees a small girl all in white and follows her out with Midori and Noriko in tow. When an avalanche comes, Ran and Midori use their powers with the girl in white to save them. The girl in white communicates through Ran and Noriko realizes the girl is actually a snow fox she helped as a child that wanted to meet Noriko again and give her back her mother's pendant that she lost years ago.
23	"Ran, Listen to the Voice of the Clay Figure"; Transliteration: "Ran, Haniwa no Koe o Kiku" (Japanese: 蘭, 埴輪の声を聞く)	November 29, 2008
While in the library, Ran hears another voice which leads her, Midori and Rui to a local museum and find the voice coming from a small haniwa. Rui manages to get permission for them to take the haniwa with them, and they research about the Yayoi period when he lived. The haniwa, formally a man named Wakatakeru, had left his village in search of a miko for his town, but never managed to find one. Ran, Rui and Midori go to area where his village used to be, and they are suddenly taken back in time to when Wakatakeru's town was in siege. Wakatakeru recognizes Ran's powers as the power of a miko, and Ran stands in for their miko to quell the fighting. Afterwards, Ran and the others are taken back to their own time.
24	"Ran and the Beast Awakened: I Have Something Inside"; Transliteration: "Ran to Mezameta Kemono ~Watashi no Naka ni Nanika ga Iru~" (Japanese: 蘭と目覚めた獣 〜私の中に何かがいる〜)	December 6, 2008
While out raking leaves at school, Ran hears an ominous voice as a strong wind passes by. In the middle of the night, animals start acting strangely and an earthquake occurs, though only a few people actually felt it. Members of the town start acting angrier than normal and are more prone to getting into fights, including Ran's classmates Junpei. That night, Rui and Midori stay over for the night at Ran's house. Rui reassures Ran that he will be there for her if anything happens. Ran awakes at night with the news that someone is being attacked at school, and she leaves with Rui, Midori and Rin to investigate.
25	"Ran and the Dead Earth ~I Have Something Inside~"; Transliteration: "Ran to Kare ta Daichi ~Watashi no Naka ni Nanika ga Iru~" (Japanese: 蘭と枯れた大地 〜私の中に何かがいる〜)	December 13, 2008
When they arrive at school, Ran and Midori find their teacher Ueda who falls from a tree and was injured by a leopard. Similar attacks have been happening around town, and school is canceled for the time being. Ran, Midori, and Rui investigate further by going to Junpei's house and find him and a tiger in his house. Junpei tells them that the tiger is actually his brother, and shortly after Junpei turns into the same leopard from before. Ran, Midori, and Rui head to the school's old beech tree to find a group of the transformed human animals and their old teacher Momoko. The Great Mother, actually a very old wolf spirit named Ōgami, is also there, and explains to Ran and Midori that once humans lived in harmony with animals, but now they must be eradicated.
26	"Ran and Midori ~I Have Something Inside~"; Transliteration: "Ran to Midori ~Watashi no Naka ni Nanika ga Iru~" (Japanese: 蘭と翠 〜私の中に何かがいる〜)	December 20, 2008
As the animals attack, Midori tries to fight back, but Ran stops her, which causes them to get injured. While arguing, Midori and Momoko are transported somewhere else while Ran still tries to reason with Ōgami to not destroy humanity. Ran continues to get more injured by cuts from the animals, but still chooses not to fight back. When Midori makes it back to where Ran is, she also does not fight, which eventually causes all of the animals to turn back into humans, saying they believe in Ran. Ōgami is finally persuaded, and they are taken back to the beech tree at school which is now much larger and thriving; Ran's and Midori's cuts are also gone. Time skips to when Ran and the others are in their second year of junior-high school, but now Rui is in a different class, which depresses Ran. Ran hears another voice, and goes with Midori to investigate the new mystery.
