= List of Casshern Sins episodes =

Casshern Sins DVD cover, Volume 1. An unmasked Casshern and Friender are featured on the cover as some of the show's leading characters.

Casshern Sins is a remake of the original Casshern anime. It was first announced at the Tokyo International Anime Fair 2008 with Madhouse being in charge of animation. Soon after, an official trailer was posted online on its official Japanese website. The 2008 show was directed by Shiyasu Yamauchi. The plot centers on Casshern, who is originally a subordinate of Braiking Boss instead of being a hero to humanity. He was sent to assassinate a girl named Luna due to Boss' fears that she would liberate humanity from his grip. Her death resulted in a war that has humanity on the losing end with robots being on the verge of death due to the radical change in the environment; a legend was made known to the robots that Casshern's death can save them all.

The show had previously aired on Japan's Chiba TV, TV Aichi, MBS, TV Kanagawa & TV Saitama stations. The show aired in Japan from October 1, 2008, to March 18, 2009. Casshern Sins had also aired on Singapore's Arts Central channel. The series aired in North American on December 14, 2010, on the Funimation Channel. Adult Swim broadcast the anime on their newly revived Toonami programming block beginning on May 27, 2012. The opening theme is "Aoi Hana" (青い花, lit. Blue Flower) by Color Bottle. The ending theme for the first 12 episodes is "reason" by K∧N∧, the ending theme of the 13th episode is "Aoi Kage" (蒼い影, lit. Blue Shadow) by Masanori Sera, and the mext ending theme is "Hikari to Kage" (光と影, lit. Light and Shadow) by Kunoshinji.

The series is licensed and distributed in Oceania by Siren Visual with the Japanese dub intact and having English subtitles in 2 DVDs, one with episodes 1-12 and the second with episodes 13-24 for its release in Australia and New Zealand. Funimation Entertainment has announced a North American release and licensing for the show at the 2009 Otakon panel.

Casshern Sins was released in Region 2 for both DVD and Blu-ray versions. DVD Boxsets were released for ¥12,600 with from February 25, 2009, March 25, 2009, April 24, 2009 and June 10, 2009. Single DVDs were released for ¥6,300 from July 24, 2009, for Volumes 1 and 2 followed by Volumes 3 and 4 on August 21, 2009. Volumes 5 and 6 were released on September 18, 2009 Volumes 7 and 8 were released on October 23, 2009. Blu-ray versions of the show in Region 2 were released for ¥15,750 with Volume 1 released on February 25, 2009. Volume 2 was subsequently released on March 25, 2009. Volume 3 was released on April 24, 2009 and Volume 4 was released on June 10, 2009.

== Episodes ==
| No. | Title | Original release date | English release date |
|---|---|---|---|
| 1 | "At the End of the World"; Transliteration: "Shūmatsu no Sekai de" (Japanese: 終末の世界で) | October 1, 2008 | August 31, 2010 |
In the near future, an amnesiac Casshern fights anti-human robots on a desolate Earth. Most of the humans were killed in an apocalyptic war when he was serving under the direction of Braiking Boss after he assassinated a woman named Luna. During his quest to find out who he is, Casshern befriends a robot girl named Ringo. However, Ringo becomes frightened of Casshern after he ruthlessly kills a robot who was trying to attack her. Not long after, he encounters an anti-Casshern mercenary named Lyuze.
| 2 | "A World Replete with Death Throes"; Transliteration: "Sekai wa Dan Matsu no Koe ni Michite" (Japanese: 世界は断末の声に満ちて) | October 8, 2008 | September 7, 2010 |
Casshern meets a robotic couple and their dog named Friender. He finds out that they reside with a community of robots who have declared their acceptance of the Ruin, seeking to live in peace until they die. Upon discovering his identity, however, the robots turn on Casshern, and attempt to eat him to survive. Casshern is forced to defend himself, unfortunately going berserk and killing even those that have no intention on hurting him. Casshern destroys nearly the entire community, leaving Friender the only survivor.
| 3 | "To the Ends of Agony"; Transliteration: "Kunō no Hate ni" (Japanese: 苦悩の果てに) | October 15, 2008 | September 14, 2010 |
After leaving the now-empty robot town, Casshern meets the first human being in his travels, that being a man called Akos. Upon learning that the robot community is no more, he starts following Casshern around. Akos teaches Casshern about the fragility of humans, and reveals that he is currently under the same situation as he is, running away from his problems. Later, Casshern re-encounters a vengeful Friender. After being injured by the dog, Casshern decides to surrender his life to Friender, who spares him and instead joins him in his travels. Akos then decides to part ways with Casshern and Friender, and his last words to Casshern are that he is not a Grim Reaper after all, because he did not die traveling with him. Moments later, Akos succumbs to his prolonged illness and dies in the sand.
| 4 | "The Angel of Ruin"; Transliteration: "Horobi no Tenshi" (Japanese: 滅びの天使) | October 22, 2008 | September 21, 2010 |
Casshern meets Sophita, a female robot who enjoys fighting and killing her own kind. She is dubbed "The Angel of Ruin" by the robots who have heard of her and fear her. Sophita tries to duel Casshern, but the latter refuses. She tells him that fighting is her way of living, albeit in a twisted way. A group of armed robots then arrives trying to kill Sophita, and Casshern intervenes. Ultimately, Sophita attacks Casshern and tries to end his life because she feels that is what he truly desires.
| 5 | "The Man Who Killed the Sun Named Moon"; Transliteration: "Tsuki toiu Na no Taiyō o Koroshita Otoko" (Japanese: 月という名の太陽を殺した男) | October 29, 2008 | September 28, 2010 |
Lyuze appears before Casshern again, condemning him for Luna's death. Luna was dubbed "The Source of Life" for this world. In the past, Lyuze's sister Liza was tasked to protect Luna, but failed to prevent her death. Casshern allows Lyuze to try and kill him when he learns more of the Ruin. Casshern almost kills Lyuze in his berserk mode, but Friender saves her. Meanwhile, Ringo and Ohji trade usable parts to robots who are in need of them. A robot bandit gang attacks and steals the parts from them. Casshern arrives to stop them, but again loses control and kills several unrelated robots. He only stops when Ringo, who is still terrified of him, shouts at him to stop.
| 6 | "Reunited with Fate"; Transliteration: "Unmei to no Saikai" (Japanese: 運命との再会) | November 5, 2008 | October 5, 2010 |
Dio, a cyborg fighter who looks just like Casshern, claims that they were created as killing machines and served under Braiking Boss before the Ruin. The two cyborgs face off against each other, but Lyuze intervenes and critically wounds Dio in order to force him to stop fighting. Before he retreats, Lyuze angrily tells Dio that Casshern needs to stay alive until the memories of his sins return.
| 7 | "The Woman of the Tall Tower"; Transliteration: "Takai Tō no Onna" (Japanese: 高い塔の女) | November 12, 2008 | October 12, 2010 |
Casshern visits a dilapidated factory, with an incomplete high tower atop it. There he meets Lizabel, a former worker-robot who uses other robots as parts for her tower. Her wish is to place a giant bell at the top of the tower and, by ringing it, remind anyone who hears it that the world is still beautiful. She is entranced by Casshern's restored body and tries to melt him down to make her bell, but fails. In the end, Lizabel is forced to create a bell that sounded horribly when struck, annoying the robots who heard it and causing them to attack and nearly destroy her tower in the process.
| 8 | "A Hymn of Hope"; Transliteration: "Kibō no Sanka" (Japanese: 希望の賛歌) | November 19, 2008 | October 19, 2010 |
Casshern escorts a robot singer named Janice, who wants to travel to a rundown city known as the Bazaar in order to sing and bring hope to robot refugees who had been hiding there from the Ruin. Meanwhile, they are being stalked by a band of robots who believe that hope should die in a world full of ruin. They plan to wait until Janice reaches the Bazaar, then massacre everyone. As Casshern and Janice finally reach the Bazaar, it is revealed that Janice is also at the brink of Ruin, so she dedicates one final song to Casshern while he and Friender defend everyone from the killers assaulting the Bazaar.
| 9 | "The Flower That Blooms in the Valley of Ruin"; Transliteration: "Horobi no Tani ni Saku Hana" (Japanese: 滅びの谷に咲く花) | November 26, 2008 | October 26, 2010 |
While battling a horde of robots, Casshern is pushed off a cliff, then falls into a hole in the ground. There, he finds an odd little robot girl who tends his wounds and gives him flowers. When Ringo, Ohji, and Lyuze arrive, it is revealed that the place was in fact a graveyard for robots. The strange girl's name was Nico and she used to be a servant of Luna. Not long after, the robots who were fighting Casshern find him again and attack. As Casshern and Lyuze fight them off, Nico is killed while protecting a doll made of scraps that she still perceived to be Luna. Following the last words of the robot named Bolton, Casshern and company now travel the land searching for what remains of Luna, who might be able to undo the Ruin.
| 10 | "The Man Entrapped by the Past"; Transliteration: "Kako ni Toraware ta Otoko" (Japanese: 過去に囚われた男) | December 3, 2008 | November 2, 2010 |
Rather than focusing on Casshern, this episode follows Dio and his quest to reestablish utopia by gathering wandering robots to form his army. During the gathering, a mysterious robot dressed heavily in tattered cloak barges in rambling about the death of Luna. It is revealed the robot's name is Dune, a guardian assigned as Luna's bodyguard. Leda attempts to dispose of Dune but in the end requires Dio's help. In a fit of rage for being mistaken as Casshern, Dio viciously incapacitates Dune. As Dio, with Leda by his side, motivates his robot army with a speech, a crippled Dune once again wanders the lands mourning Luna's death.
| 11 | "By One's Calling"; Transliteration: "Onore no Shimei no Moto ni" (Japanese: 己の使命のもとに) | December 10, 2008 | November 9, 2010 |
After being attacked by rogue robots, Friender tries to rescue Casshern from debris. Failing to do so and breaking a leg in the process, Friender leaves Casshern behind and encounters a mixed group of robots and humans led by Jin, who believes that Luna is alive and is looking for her. One of the members, Gido, learns that Friender was a companion of the infamous Casshern and abandons Jin's group to join the rogue robots.
| 12 | "Turn the Time Lived to Color"; Transliteration: "Ikita Toki o Iro ni shite" (Japanese: 生きた時を色にして) | December 17, 2008 | November 16, 2010 |
Casshern and Friender arrive at a city that is surrounded by a lake, which is populated with robots who have already accepted death. Casshern meets a disabled robot, Margo, who considers himself as an artist and paints white colors around the city. However, the current leader of the robots is far from pleased with Margo's optimistic behavior, and considers his presence to be corrupting to his fellow robots who have accepted their Ruin.
| 13 | "The Past Rises Before My Eyes"; Transliteration: "Kako wa Me no Mae ni Michiru" (Japanese: 過去は目の前に満ちる) | December 24, 2008 | November 23, 2010 |
Casshern, Friender and a stalking Lyuze trail a group of wailing robots who call to Luna and say that meeting her will bring salvation. Ringo arrives, chasing after Casshern's group. While seeking shelter, Casshern encounters his former master, Braiking Boss, who explains Luna's immortality and Casshern's order to assassinate her.
| 14 | "The Truth Illuminates the Darkness"; Transliteration: "Shinjitsu wa Yami o Terashi" (Japanese: 真実は闇を照らし) | January 7, 2009 | November 30, 2010 |
As Casshern takes his leave, a crying Ringo chases after him. Meanwhile Dio's army begins to exterminate all robots who still believe in Luna. Ringo is targeted by Dio's army, and although Ohji charges in to save Ringo, they still end up cornered. Casshern, Friender, and Lyuze then intervene to save Ohji and Ringo. Dio once again makes his appearance and duels Casshern, who now has a reason to live, in that he must protect the weak and the dying. While the battle ends with Dio's army being routed, in the shadows of countless robots a female figure appears calling herself Luna.
| 15 | "The God of Death Dune"; Transliteration: "Shinigami no Dūn" (Japanese: 死神ドゥーン) | January 14, 2009 | December 7, 2010 |
Dune, last seen after being defeated by Dio, crawls painfully across a crystallized landscape, all the while trying to hold on to his memories. Casshern, Friender, and Lyuze also pass through the same area, and encounter Dune, though none of them knows or remembers him. Dune then forces a confrontation with Casshern, who defeats him, allowing Dune to move on.
| 16 | "For the Strength to Believe"; Transliteration: "Shinjiru Chikara no Tame ni" (Japanese: 信じる力のために) | January 21, 2009 | December 14, 2010 |
Casshern and Lyuze discover vast swaths of robot remains while approaching a valley. Inside, they discover that all the robots were heading to a strange circular megalith prior to their deaths. Ringo and Ohji meet up with Casshern and Lyuze, and the pasts of the former two are explained. Meanwhile, Dio faces a problem when his reconnaissance group, sent to find Luna's whereabouts, is decimated by two mysterious robots. He and Leda find Vulcan and Mars, who were considered best fighters of Braiking Boss next to the cyborgs. After being given an inspirational talk by Braiking Boss, Dio defeats Mars before Braiking Boss finishes off Vulcan.
| 17 | "The Glass Cradle"; Transliteration: "Garasu no Yurikago" (Japanese: ガラスのゆりかご) | January 28, 2009 | December 21, 2010 |
Casshern and the others meet a trio of robotic children. Ringo makes friends with one of them, a mute robot named Holter. When the three kids return to their home, which happens to be an important location, they bump into Dio and Leda, and Leda pretends to be nice to them in order to glean information about Luna. Leda then attacks the children upon seeing the glass tanks where Luna was said to be born, when Casshern intervenes to fight her. Just as Leda is about to critically injure Casshern, Dio appears and reminds her that he should be the one to kill Casshern.
| 18 | "The Time I've Lived and the Time I Have Left"; Transliteration: "Iki ta Toki Korekara no Jikan" (Japanese: いきた時これからの時間) | February 2, 2009 | December 28, 2010 |
Lyuze questions her original intentions for revenge against Casshern, and her current intentions for him. After going through a series of mind-bending scenarios, she realizes that she has fallen in love with Casshern. Lyuze decides that her way of continue living is to pursue the same goals as Casshern, and stick with him as long as her life lasts.
| 19 | "Believe in the Flower That Lives in Your Heart"; Transliteration: "Kokoro ni Sumu Hana o Shinji te" (Japanese: 心に棲む花を信じて) | February 9, 2009 | January 4, 2011 |
Continuing their journey, Casshern and Lyuze are attacked by two robots named Castor and Helene. The encounter causes Lyuze to become concerned that she is beginning to ruin, showing signs that the time will come soon for her, and she becomes distant. While hiding in a cave, Ringo mentions a story that Ohji once told her about an immortal monster that lives in caves. Lyuze feels Ringo's story relates to Casshern and she states that she is jealous of his immortality.
| 20 | "For Whom do the Flowers Bloom?"; Transliteration: "Dare ga Tame ni Hana wa Saku" (Japanese: 誰がために花は咲く) | February 16, 2009 | January 11, 2011 |
Casshern, Lyuze, and Ringo finally reach Luna's castle. They meet up with Dune, who has rejoined Luna. Casshern's group is stunned to see the large number of robots that await Luna's healing. Casshern finds one of the robots who is healed by Luna earlier attacked and beaten to near death by other robots. After Dune suffers severe injuries after a bandit attack, Luna refuses to heal him and lets him die. Casshern and the others are shocked and angry at Luna's change in behavior and outlook on life. Elsewhere, Braiking Boss visits the graves of his dead subordinates, while Leda is informed of Luna's whereabouts. Casshern confronts Luna, and questions whether her current role will truly bring salvation to the world.
| 21 | "The Paradise of Lost Hope"; Transliteration: "Shitsubō no Rakuen" (Japanese: 失望の楽園) | February 23, 2009 | January 18, 2011 |
Luna tells Casshern's group that her blood can grant eternal life, but her outlook on death has changed negatively, completely shunning it. She wants them to stay but Casshern and the others leave. Later Casshern changes his mind and wants to bring Ringo for Luna to heal, against Lyuze's protests. They reunite with Ohji, who tells them that Luna is not salvation; she grants death. A long time ago, humans found a way to live eternally, but Braiking Boss found it revolting and started exterminating humans, eventually giving the order to assassinate Luna. Ohji explains that the old Luna and the current Luna are different. However, upon witnessing Luna's results, Ohji forces Ringo to see Luna, but the girl refuses. Casshern reaches Dio and Leda's army who has come to get rid of Luna, but he allows himself to be brutally attacked by them.
| 22 | "A Drop Called Eternity"; Transliteration: "Eien toiu na no Shizuku" (Japanese: 永遠という名の雫) | March 2, 2009 | January 25, 2011 |
Dio captures Casshern and brings him back to Luna's castle. Leda wants Dio to be healed along with her by Luna, but he refuses. Leda finds Luna and orders her to heal only those that are chosen, like her. Meanwhile, Braiking Boss is followed by robots on the verge of ruin. Leda receives Luna's healing, but it is not enough as she starts to break down again. She demands more healing from Luna, who complies. However, the increased healing she receives is much more painful than the first one. Dio takes Casshern away for him to regenerate so that he can battle him again in a fair fight. Casshern learns that Dio's reason to live is to defeat him. After a painful regeneration, Casshern prepares for one final battle with his archenemy.
| 23 | "Those Who Return"; Transliteration: "Kaeru mono tachi" (Japanese: 還る者達) | March 9, 2009 | February 1, 2011 |
Braiking Boss leaves the robot graveyard and, followed by an army of robots, begin their journey. Casshern and Dio fight their best, and the former sees Dio being truly alive when he is battling him. Leda wakes up in a pile of ruined robots, having been dumped by Luna's subordinates. She is shocked to see her body in an advanced stage of ruin and swears revenge on Luna. She encounters Ringo, but is hesitant to kill her. After Lyuze arrives for Ringo, Leda immediately retreats. The fight ends in a climax as Casshern and Dio deal each other a powerful blow. Dio seemingly declares victory on Casshern. Leda confronts Luna at her castle and is about to kill her when Luna stabs her. Casshern arrives on the scene and tells Leda that Dio wanted him to save her. Leda stumbles off to look for Dio. Casshern tells Luna that they are different from others, because as being immortal, they are not truly alive. He rejects Luna's offer to be a king in the eternal world she resides, swearing never to take another life again, and leaves with Lyuze, Ringo, and Ohji. Leda finds Dio with a missing arm, and rests peacefully at his side. Braiking Boss arrives to take up Luna's offer to be the king in the eternal world.
| 24 | "To the Wandering Blooming Flowers"; Transliteration: "Meguri Saku Hana he" (Japanese: 巡り咲く花へ) | March 16, 2009 | February 8, 2011 |
Casshern, Lyuze, Ringo, and Ohji live on away from Luna, growing flowers. However, Lyuze and Ohji die from the effects of ruin. Meanwhile, robots continue to flock to Luna's sanctuary, except that she wanted robots who are decaying to be killed. Casshern and Ringo bury Lyuze and Ohji, then Casshern leaves to confront Luna again. Casshern fights against Braiking Boss and his men, defeating them. Encountering Luna, she stabs Casshern with a broadsword, but is stunned to see Casshern not attempting to kill her once more. Casshern warns her that he will come back if Luna and the saved robots and humans forget what death is. Years later, Ringo, now a beautiful young lady, and Friender stay near Lyuze and Ohji's graves, waiting eternally for Casshern to return.
