= List of Itazura na Kiss episodes =

The following is the list of episodes from the anime adaptation of the manga series Itazura na Kiss. The anime adaptation is distinct from the manga itself. It is revealed that the intended finale of the manga by the late author Kaoru Tada will be conceptualized in the anime for the first time with plot details provided by her husband.

== Overview ==
The anime contains 25 episodes. The episodes are directed by Osamu Yamazaki and produced by TMS Entertainment. The episodes started airing on April 4, 2008, on TBS. Subsequently, Sun TV began airing the episodes from April 15, 2008, and Chubu-Nippon Broadcasting Co., Ltd on April 9, 2008.

As the manga only ran until volume 23, the ending remained unfinished. The anime adaptation after episode 22 is not included in the unfinished manga.

Three pieces of theme music are used for the episodes; one opening theme and two ending themes. The opening theme, "Kimi, Meguru, Boku" is performed by Motohiro Hata. The first ending theme, "Kataomoi Fighter" is sung by GO!GO!7188, while the second ending theme, "Jikan yo Tomare" is performed by AZU featuring Seamo starting in episode 13. The song was also featured briefly during episode 10.

== Anime adaptation episode list ==
No.	Title	Original release date
1	"Fate's Prank"; Transliteration: "Unmei no Itazura" (Japanese: 運命のイタズラ)	April 4, 2008
Kotoko, from the lowly F-Class, has a crush on Irie, who is the top-ranked student from A-Class. After two years, she collects her courage and confesses to him and tried to give him a confession letter, only to be bluntly turned down. Irie even goes so far as to say he hates stupid girls (meaning her) and doesn't even read her confession letter. When an earthquake strikes Tokyo, her house is the only one damaged. A friend of Kotoko's father jumps at the opportunity to lend a hand, and in a surprising turn of events they end up living at Irie's house.
2	"Living Together is Dangerous"; Transliteration: "Abunai Doukyo Seikatsu" (Japanese: アブない同居生活)	April 9, 2008
While walking to school together, Irie tells Kotoko that he doesn't care for her, and when Kotoko is pushed off the train at the wrong station Irie does not help her, saying he hates absent-minded girls even more than stupid ones. Using an embarrassing childhood picture she received from Irie's mother, Kotoko blackmails Irie into tutoring her on the next exam, saying she'll hand over the picture if she makes it into the top 50 scores among the students. As they study, the two of them get to know each other better, and Irie's mother hands Kotoko a good luck charm for the test. Kotoko misses the train again, but this time Irie helps her. After the test, Kotoko makes it to the 50th spot, while Irie ranks number one. Kotoko opens the charm to reveal a picture of the two of them sleeping peacefully while studying. Her friends find out and end up teasing Irie, who angrily turns on Kotoko.
3	"Baton Touch of Love"; Transliteration: "Koi no batontacchi" (Japanese: 恋のバトンタッチ)	April 16, 2008
Kotoko falls asleep with a confession letter in her hand. When Irie walks in to tell her it's her turn in the shower, he impulsively decides to read the letter. Later at the school sports festival, Kotoko and Irie end up competing against each other in the relay race. Just as Irie sprints across the finish line, Kotoko gets pushed and falls in front of him and she gets run over. Kin steams as Irie carries her to the nurse. Irie embarrassingly recites the letter she wrote to him; before he gets to the last part where she had written that she loves him, she jumps up and slaps him. Then Kin jumps in the room and proceeds to boast of his passion for Kotoko. Irie replies that people's feelings can change, the person you hate might become the person you love.
4	"Throbbing Summer Vacation"; Transliteration: "Dokki doki na natsuyasumi" (Japanese: ドッキドキな夏休み)	April 23, 2008
Kotoko, Irie and friends visit Waterland. While Irie's getting ice cream, Yuuki ends up sinking in the pool, and Kotoko saves him. Irie overhears about the rescue, rushes back to Yuuki, and is pleased at Kotoko's actions. Later, Kotoko gets a cramp in her leg while on the water slide, and this time it is Irie's opportunity to save her from drowning. After dinner, Kotoko retreats to her room to finish her summer homework, but runs into trouble. She sneaks into Irie's room to get the answers, instead she finds the diary where Yuuki writes how he feels about her (an annoying dummy); she rewrites it and moves on to find Irie's homework. But Irie notices her actions, proceeds to tease her, pretends to want to have sex with her, muttering that a genius can sometimes turn into a monster, and afterward he makes it up by helping her with her homework.
5	"The Crucial Moment! Class F's Winter Battle"; Transliteration: "Gakeppuchi! F Gumi Fuyu no Jin" (Japanese: ガケっぷち!F組冬の陣)	April 30, 2008
The final exams starts next week, and the results decide whether or not the F-class students make it into college. After having received prior assistance from Naoki with her and her friends' schoolwork, much to Irie's annoyance. Kotoko is cajoled to get Naoki to tutor the whole of Class F so they can pass their finals. With Naoki's help, the whole of Class F passes their finals (with the exception of Kinnosuke who is too proud to receive any help from Irie.) When it is Christmas Day the class chips in to get a gift for Irie which ends up being a Kotoko doll. Kotoko on the other hand works really hard as a waitress to buy Irie's Christmas present.
6	"Chocolates, Exams, and The Jinx"; Transliteration: "Choco to Juken to Ekibyougami" (Japanese: チョコと受験と疫病神)	May 7, 2008
It's Valentines Day soon, Irie's mother helps Kotoko make homemade chocolate, but Kotoko fails to give them to Irie. Later on, Naoki goes to take the entrance exam to Tokyo University. Kotoko sets off to accompany him to the venue; however, the plot twists when Kotoko's health takes a turn for the worse. Irie abandons the exam in order to bring Kotoko to the hospital. After this incident, Kotoko tries to leave the Irie household blaming herself for ruining Irie's chance of getting into Tokyo University. As she tries to leave, Irie talks to her saying he could have made it in time to do the exam but he didn't, as he wants to go to the same college as Kotoko since she is "interesting to have around". After deciding to stay, Kotoko makes more chocolate for Irie, but he rejects saying he doesn't like sweet things.
7	"Spiteful Kiss"; Transliteration: "Ijiwaru na KISS" (Japanese: イジワルなKiss)	May 14, 2008
Having missed the entrance exams for Tokyo University, Naoki decides to go with the school's escalator system. After the graduation ceremony, the F and A classes bump into each other during their farewell dinners. An exchange of heated words soon ensues when Naoki puts Kotoko down in front of everyone triggering her to show Irie's childhood photo of him dressed as a girl to the others and Irie drags her out into a dark alley. While in a heated argument, Kotoko says she will forget about Irie and he replies by saying just try then he kisses her and after the kiss he sticks his tongue out and says "Serves you right" and departs.
8	"The Campus Life I've Longed For!?"; Transliteration: "Akogare no kyanpasu raifu!?" (Japanese: 憧れのキャンパスライフ!?)	May 21, 2008
The first day of college has finally arrived and Kotoko finds it hard to forget her kiss with Irie. Just as she thinks she's finally secured a place in Naoki's heart, an obstacle arises in the form of Yuko Matsumoto- smart, beautiful, and talented. After finding out Yuuko Matsumoto and Irie have joined the tennis club, she joins the club as well.
9	"Aim for a Date!"; Transliteration: "Deeto o nerae!" (Japanese: デートをねらえ!)	May 28, 2008
Joining the tennis club turns out to be the worst decision of Kotoko's college life. The grueling practice, the painful injuries and the complete feeling of incompetence would be worth it...if only Naoki would show up to practice!! Meanwhile, Kotoko works up the courage to ask Naoki to the latest romantic movie, but Naoki refuses. Kotoko decides to go to the movie anyway but is shocked to see Naoki there with none other than Yuko Matsumoto!? Can Kotoko really compete?
10	"Goodbye Rainy Day"; Transliteration: "Sayonara reinii·dei" (Japanese: さよならレイニー·デイ)	June 4, 2008
Kotoko's father has decided that he and Kotoko have overstayed their welcome, and so the time has finally come for Kotoko to leave the Irie's! How will Kotoko manage? Has she lost her only advantage to winning Naoki's heart!? The next day Kotoko goes to Irie's house to pass by, but hears a crashing sound inside and finds Irie's little brother with stomach pains and vomiting. He is admitted to a hospital and released one week later. At the end of the episode Kotoko ends up moving back with Irie.
11	"Kiss, Kiss, Kiss in a Dream"; Transliteration: "Yume de kiss·Kiss·Kiss" (Japanese: 夢でkiss·Kiss·Kiss)	June 11, 2008
Naoki begins thinking about what he wants to do with his life and about the future of the family business. For spring break, Kotoko and Sudou goes to Romance Village to be closer to Naoki and Matsumoto. However, the experience isn't as "romantic" as it may seem. Kotoko dreams that Irie kisses her and Yuuki is hiding behind the tree where she was sleeping.
12	"Mismatched Hearts"; Transliteration: "Surechigau haato tachi" (Japanese: すれ違うハートたち)	June 25, 2008
Irie tells his father he does not wish to take over his company, instead he wants to become a doctor. Irie's dad has a heart attack after he hears this. When the company employees come to see Irie senior in hospital, one of them requests a marriage interview with Irie. Irie meets Chris and decides to marry her. Kotoko goes on a date with Kin and officially proposes to her.
13	"Love Period"; Transliteration: "Koi no piriodo" (Japanese: 恋のピリオド)	July 2, 2008
Kotoko decides to give up on Irie after she overhears him telling oba-chan that he likes Chris. Worried over how to answer Kin, Kotoko talks to her dad about what he thinks about marrying Kin. Kotoko's father suggests that they leave Irie's place, Kotoko agrees. Irie brings Chris home to meet his family, Oba-chan acts very stuck-up, even Yuuki doesn't seem to be too happy about Irie marrying Chris, he confronts Irie and comments that Irie is in love with someone else. Oba is very upset while talking to her husband in hospital saying she was sure Irie loved Kotoko but now he's marrying Chris, Yuuki comes in and claims that the only one Irie-kun loves is Kotoko. Kotoko skips Tennis to go and see Kin and plans to say yes to his marriage proposal. Kotoko's two friends catch up to Irie and Matsumoto talking and explain that Kotoko is not with them because she went to see Kin and give him an answer regarding his marriage proposal. When Irie hears about this, he runs off. Meanwhile, Kin requests Kotoko's answer but she is unable to give him one and asks for more time. Kin becomes angry and says he will force Kotoko to forget Irie and grabs onto her. She yells 'Irie-kun' as she tries to push Kind away and he falls to the floor crying. Kotoko runs out into the rain, realizing she will never forget about Irie no matter what. As she accepts this, she runs into Irie.
14	"Greatest Kiss"; Transliteration: "Saikyou no Kiss" (Japanese: 最強のKiss)	July 9, 2008
Kotoko feels guilty for having led Kinnosuke on. As she walks in the rain, she encounters Irie, who reveals he had been waiting for her. As they walk home, Irie questions Kotoko about her answer to Kin. When she replies it is none of his business, Irie asks her if she loves Kin. When she tries to say that she does, Irie gets angry and yells at her that she only loves him and that she cannot love anyone else. Kotoko starts to cry and admits that he is right, but doesn't have a choice since he doesn't love her. Irie abruptly kisses her, confessing his love for her. They then walk home together, where Irie announces his proposal to the Irie family and to Kotoko's father. After getting permission, he ties up all the loose ends with his father, Chris, Kinnosuke, and Chris's father. Irie's mother rushes their wedding, and they get married within two weeks of Irie's proposal, much to Irie's annoyance.
15	"Honeymoon Panic!"; Transliteration: "Hanemuun·Panikku!" (Japanese: ハネムンパンイク)	July 16, 2008
Now married, Kotoko and Naoki head off to Hawaii for their honeymoon. They soon become acquainted with fellow newlyweds Horiuchi Mary (Mari) and Takumi. Things start to get ugly when Mary decides to interfere with Kotoko and Naoki's relationship, by inviting Naoki everywhere she goes. Whole honeymoon passes in bad mood for Kotoko and Takumi, both sad because they didn't have time to be with their loved ones. Last day of honeymoon Kotoko suggests to Naoki that they could spend the last day alone together, and he agrees. When Mary realises that, she pretends to be sick in her room, which results with Takumi calling Naoki for help. As Naoki is examining Mary, he touches her belly, and Kotoko, filled with jealousy yells at him not to touch her. Naoki gets mad, and replies that she'll have to hold her jealousy down if she wants to be doctors wife, which makes Kotoko run out in tears. Takumi goes to get medications, Mary reveals her true intentions and confesses to Naoki, who immediately rejects her. When Takumi got back he heard her saying that she will separate them, and slaps her, which makes her starting to respect him, and they promise each other they will be happy together. Meanwhile, Naoki finds Kotoko, who was lost. They spend the last night happily together, the episode ends showing them kissing (in bed).
16	"Chasing after Happiness"; Transliteration: "Oikake te happi nesu" (Japanese: 追いかけてハピネス)	July 23, 2008
Chris is about to return to England, but still harbors strong feelings for Kinnosuke. Feeling sympathetic towards Chris, Kotoko decides to help her in her quest to win Kinnosuke's heart by preparing him a birthday party. But things, naturally, went wrong, and Kinnosuke hurts Chris's feelings. Later, he finally confesses that he has feelings for her, and runs to the airport – and just as it seemed Chris is gone, she comes back, saying she just couldn't leave, and kissing Kinnosuke by surprise, which he pretty much liked. When Kotoko gets back home, Noriko goes all over her, announcing that Kotoko is probably pregnant, because she felt nausea in the morning. When Naoki hears that, he takes her to the doctor, where they realize it was false alarm. Then he reminds Kotoko on her test, and she realizes that she forgot to look at the results. It turns out that she made it, and also with highest score of all others. Then Naoki, as promised, takes her on a date.
17	"Enviable New Face"; Transliteration: "Netamaresou na New Feisu" (Japanese: ねたまれそうなNEWフェイス)	August 2, 2008
It's Kotoko's first day of learning how to be a nurse and she meets and becomes friends with four new people: Kikyou Motoki (a transgender nurse), Shinagawa Marina, Kamogari Keita (a male nurse who later harbours feelings for Kotoko), and the lovable Ogura Tomoko. She then finds out that Marina, Motoki, and Tomoko all love Naoki, and all hate his wife (who happens to be Kotoko). Unable to bring herself to say she is Naoki's wife she plays along with their plan to find out who Naoki's wife is. Later on they go to Naoki and Kotoko's house and try to find out who it is. Kotoko, frustrated with keeping the secret, is about to tell them that she is Naoki's wife, however all three of them see Naoki walking up to the house with Mastumoto Yuuko and of course believe she is Naoki's wife. Astounded by her beauty and class, Marina, Motoki, and Tomoko give up on Naoki, leaving Kotoko unhappy about the fact that they think Yuuko is Naoki's wife. The next day however Naoki comes into her classroom and tells her about some shopping requests. When he leaves, everyone is speechless and Kotoko begins apologize for deceiving them. However, finding out that Kotoko is Naoki's wife, they are filled with joy and now have their hopes up again. Kotoko feels quite insulted by this. Later at dinner, Marina, Motoki, and Tomoko group around Naoki while Kotoko is drinking with Keita. After yelling at Keita, due to being drunk, she falls asleep. Naoki is about to take her home, but Keita, furious about Naoki not caring about Kotoko's needs, yells at him. The next day when Keita sees Kotoko working as hard as she can, he lets her use his arm to practice on blood pressure. While Kotoko is getting ready, Keita begins to blush, showing he has feelings for her. At the end of the episode Naoki sees Keita and Kotoko together laughing and begins to get jealous.
18	"Ill-mannered Triangle"; Transliteration: "Fukigen na Toraianguru" (Japanese: 不機嫌なトライアングル)	August 9, 2008
Kotoko is still learning the tricks and trades of becoming a nurse. But she faints during a practice autopsy which results in Keita saving her. When he lays Kotoko down on the bed, he suddenly felt the urge to kiss her, Naoki sees this and decides to confront Keita. Keita however strongly believes that Naoki treats Kotoko with no respect and ignores Naoki's words. Then the story shows Irie staring passionately at the unconscious Kotoko, but a nurse came in with the request of Dr. Irie. Kotoko wakes up shortly after and returns to home with Keita, and meets Irie's mother halfway. Naoki's mother seems to notice that Keita is much more chivalrous to Kotoko than the cold-hearted Naoki and decides to find out more about Keita. After sneaking into the college and gaining information from other students, Keita is just a nice guy and even Naoki's mother believes that anyone would choose Keita over Naoki. The end of the episode shows Keita concerned about Kotoko going back to Naoki, and asking her to leave Naoki for her own good, as he believes Naoki does not love her.
19	"Crazy For You"	August 16, 2008
Irie starts to ignore Kotoko due to being overly jealous of Keita. During lunch one day, Chris gets burned by oil, and Kinnosuke, refusing to hand her over to anyone else, admits his feelings and devotion and proposes to Chris. Chris, after some persuasion due to insecurity, accepts. When Kotoko gets very fed-up of Irie's behaviour, she gets very upset and starts throwing books at him and saying that Keita was right about Irie not caring about her and that Keita thinks about her more than Irie does and that Keita was serious. After Irie slaps Kotoko, Kotoko yells that she's had enough and runs away; she ends up at Tomoko's house. Kotoko's dad talks to Irie about how things had been between him and Kotoko's late mother. The next day in the lunch room, Keita talks to Kotoko asking her to live with him now that she's run away from home, when Kotoko declines Keita confesses that he is in love with Kotoko, and she should not go back to someone who does not love her, Kotoko tries to defend Irie but Keita questions if Irie came after her, and just as Kotoko is feeling like Keita is right, Irie runs in claiming Keita is wrong and that he was only being the way he was because he was feeling jealous of Keita, explaining that he (Irie) has never felt jealous or sad before so he didn't know what to do; he confesses that he can work through it all with Kotoko by his side. Kotoko, still teary, questions Irie if it's ok for her to be by his side. Irie smiles at her saying that's what he wants, Kotoko runs to him and hugs him, the whole school breaks into cheers and congratulates them. And Keita walks out admitting defeat. Later, Irie is seen kissing Kotoko in their bedroom.
20	"The Nightingale Pledge"; Transliteration: "Naichingēru no Chikai" (Japanese: ナイチンゲールの誓い)	August 23, 2008
When Kotoko announces to Irie that during the capping ceremony/graduation all the male students in the medical department are to present flowers to the nurses they like, he tells Kotoko that he won't be able to make it to the ceremony because of a meeting and that the whole flower giving idea was stupid. Then Kotoko is selected as the representative for her class and has to recite the Nightingale Pledge because she is Irie's wife and because nobody except Moto volunteered but since the head nurse knows that Moto is a male and the tradition was to have female nurses to recite the Pledge, he wasn't selected. Afterward, Kotoko practices memorizing the Pledge but has trouble when Moto walks by reciting the entire Pledge perfectly. At that moment, Kotoko realizes that Moto really did want to be a female nurse because of an old movie he saw so she schemes a plan with him. Towards the end of the ceremony, Moto shows up wearing a female nurse uniform. The head nurse tells him to go get changed but Kotoko and the rest of the class objected so the nurse ended up capping Moto. Kotoko recites the Pledge perfectly and afterward, she stays behind in the cathedral and Irie shows up, shocking Kotoko. Irie apologizes to Kotoko because he didn't make it in time for the ceremony, Kotoko tells him it's ok and they hug. Four years later, Kotoko is a full fledged nurse but still acts like a novice since she runs in the halls and isn't perfunctory. Her patient is an "old hag" because she makes Kotoko run errands. The patient also secretly took pictures of Irie and when Kotoko took a picture of Irie that her patient took, the patient tells the head nurse that Kotoko was stealing. The head nurse chastises her and sends her off. As Kotoko walks by Keita and his patient Kotoko realizes that Keita's patient is in love with him even though he denies it. When she joins Moto and the other nurses, they tell Kotoko that Nobuhiro, a movie star, was in the waiting area. They drag Kotoko to find Nobuhiro and when they were standing in front of the TV a guy tells them to move and then they realize that the guy was Nobuhiro. They beg for his autograph but Nobuhiro tells them to stop bothering him. Kotoko stands up to him and Nobuhiro hugs her and says, "I miss you. Kotoko-san." However, Kotoko has no idea who he is, and is shocked.
21	"The Glass Boy"; Transliteration: "Garasu no Shōnen" (Japanese: ガラスの少年)	August 30, 2008
Nobuhiro turns out to be Yuuki's friend Non from back when Yuuki was admitted into hospital. However, he has changed very much due to his loneliness from growing up in the hospital. Kotoko manages to talk to Non and makes him realize how many people care for him.
22	"The Best Gift"; Transliteration: "Saikou no Purezento" (Japanese: 最高のプレゼント)	September 3, 2008
It is Kotoko's birthday and Irie takes her out for the night. Irie and Kotoko are very 'lovey dovey' in this episode. Irie and Kotoko pull an all-nighter at the hospital as a lot of emergencies came in, Kotoko stayed even though she seemed to have a fever. When Kotoko returns home in the morning, Oba-chan looks worried over her appearance and asks her if she's alright, Kotoko thinks she's running a slight fever, but Irie asks everyone to wait a moment, he asks Kotoko if she's pregnant, Oba-chan and Yuuki both get a shock and yell 'what!'The episode is left at a cliffhanger.
23	"You, Go Around, Me"; Transliteration: "Kimi, Meguru, Boku" (Japanese: キミ、メグル、ボク)	September 11, 2008
After visiting the hospital, it is confirmed that Kotoko is indeed pregnant by three months. Oba-san throws a party, Kotoko and Irie's fathers both look up baby names, even Yuuki is excited though he tries not to show it, but is later seen with toys for the baby. After the party, Kotoko and Irie enter their bedroom, Kotoko is a bit worried and questions Irie on what he thinks about her being pregnant, if he's happy about it or not. Irie calls her an idiot and hugs her saying he is very happy. Going into work, Kotoko's friends put her into doubt about Irie's loyalty to her. As Kotoko spies on him (with Oba-san spying on both Kotoko and Irie) she sees him talking and laughing along with a young nurse. Kotoko then sees Irie talking to Yuuko Matsumoto who it seems has been admitted to hospital. Later, while walking home, Kotoko questions him about the young nurse, Irie mentions the young nurse is cute, Kotoko seems to feel down after hearing that. The next day Kotoko spies on Irie and the young nurse as they visit Yuuko Matsumoto, who sees Kotoko standing outside, Kotoko covers up by saying she was worried about Yuuko. Irie talks to the young nurse using 'chan' after her name, Kotoko gets all jealous, but her jealousy is cut short as Sudo-senpai rushes into Yuuko's room and bumps into Kotoko on the way in, therefore ending her jealousy trance. Later when their shift is over, Irie reassures Kotoko's doubts of him, and catches her as she's about to fall down the stairs. As they stand there, Kotoko's friends spy on them. As Kin announces that he is going to marry Chris, two men in black walk into the restaurant, it seems Chris's mother is here, she grabs Kin's face and takes time to examine him, then tells Chris that Kin is a very handsome man, also saying that Kin should come to England to marries Chris, but Kin disagrees. Back at the hospital, Matsumoto Yuuko is giving Sudu-san and Kotoko a hard time, as she tries to go back to work. When Sudo gets angry at her for not thinking of her own health he slaps her, causing Yuuko to punch him in the face as she walks out in an angry fit with Kotoko chasing after her, when Yuuko tells Kotoko to leave her alone as she's going back to work, Kotoko questions her and asks if Yuuko is going to work still dressed in her pyjamas. As they return to Yuuko's room they overhear Sudo-san talking to Irie about Yuuko. Yuuko then returns to her bed saying she will be staying until she gets better. Kotoko and Irie-kun return home, Oba-san calls Irie over and tells him that she is very upset with him, showing him all the photos she took of him talking to other nurses. Kotoko and Irie enter their bedroom and Kotoko says that Oba was just worried, but Kotoko stops talking mid-sentence, Irie asks what's wrong. Kotoko answered him that it seems that the baby in her womb is moving.
24	"Happy Love Carnival"; Transliteration: "Happī Rabu Kānibaru" (Japanese: ハッピー·ラブ·カーニバル)	September 18, 2008
Kotoko is messing around with her C-cup breasts. She later on goes to see Kin and finds out that Chris is 3 months pregnant. Kotoko, after coming back home, tells Irie about the news. She later doesn't feel good and thinks it is because of the iron tablets she's been taking to replenish her blood. She doesn't tell Irie about this because she doesn't want to disturb him while he's writing his thesis. The next day, Kotoko and her friends are discussing when Kotoko is going to take maternal leave. She refuses quickly, stating that she wants to work as much as possible and goes to see Irie. Later on, her friends from work go home and leave Kotoko to walk home with Irie but he informs her that he will be working late that evening as he wants to do more of his thesis. Kotoko is on the subway where she thinks that she feels a bit light-headed. As she is walking up the steps from the subway she collapses at the top not feeling well, she is spotted and then an ambulance is called, Kotoko is unconscious. Irie is then seen writing when his mobile phone starts ringing. He is running through to the hospital where Kotoko is, all of the family is there. It turns out she was exerting herself too much during pregnancy. One month later Kotoko persuades Irie to go to pregnancy classes with Kin and Chris. It's there where she goes into labor. Kotoko, Irie and Oba-san are at the vending machines at the hospital when Matsumoto is rushed in with Sudou. She has been coughing up blood due to her illness. Irie has no option but to operate and that's when Kotoko gives birth, with Irie missing it. They have a baby girl and call her Kotomi. Four years later it is clear that Kotoko and Kotomi are rivals for Irie's love.
25	"Hello Again"; Transliteration: "Haroō Agein" (Japanese: ハロー·アゲイン)	September 25, 2008
Kotoko, Naoki and their daughter Kotomi go to Naoki's grandparents home. On the train, Naoki has a flashback to when he and Kotoko visited there after their marriage. Kotoko arrives there feeling excited about spending time with Irie alone, but is deeply disappointed when she finds out that he had lied to her and that they are not alone. In fact, they are staying with Irie's grandfather. Everyone in the family (excluding Irie's grandmother) gives Kotoko a hard time. But, with the help of Irie's grandfather's spirit, who also tells her to bring her baby the next time she visits, she overcomes the difficulty and gains the family's approval of her being Irie's wife. Back in present day, Kotomi, Kotoko and Irie arrive. While walking down the path to the house Kotomi meets the spirit of her great-grandfather and cheerfully waves to him.
