= List of Kyōran Kazoku Nikki episodes =

The following is the list of episodes for the Japanese anime series Kyōran Kazoku Nikki. The episodes are produced by Nomad and are directed by Yasuhiro Kuroda. The series is composed by Mamiko Ikeda and anime characters designed by Makoto Koga in reference to the characters from the light novel series designed by x6suke. The anime started its run on TV Kanagawa on April 12, 2008, and subsequently aired on other stations such as Chiba TV, Tokai TV, TV Osaka, TV Saitama, TV Shinhiroshima and TVQ Kyushu Broadcasting Co., Ltd. Nine different pieces of theme music are used—one opening theme and eight ending themes. The eight different ending themes are sung by each of the eight main characters. The order of the ending themes and their associated animation sequence differs for each TV station.

== List of episodes ==
No.	Title	Original release date
1	"Kyōka-Sama, Reigning"; Transliteration: "Kyōka-Sama, Kunrinsu" (Japanese: 凶華様、君臨す)	April 12, 2008
Ouka stumbles upon a "young girl" stealing an apple one day and finds himself part of the "Cozy Family Operation" - a top secret mission in which he has to take the place of father for an abnormal family to find the child of Enka who is destined to destroy the world.
2	"Party Time Never Ends"; Transliteration: "Utage no Jikan wa Owaranai" (Japanese: 宴の時間は終わらない)	April 19, 2008
While Kyouka is busy dreaming about the perfect wedding for her and Ouka, Yuuka is having a hard time fitting in at school, and is continually bullied. To resolve the problem Kyouka jumps into a mother's shoes, causing the frenzied family to perform a short play in the middle of Yuuka's gym class to make Yuuka appear to be a magical girl. Meanwhile the culprit behind the bullying is revealed.
3	"Himemiya's Demon Princess"; Transliteration: "Himemiya no Onihime-sama" (Japanese: 姫宮の鬼姫様)	April 26, 2008
The bullying is yet to cease, and so, Yuuka comes home crying one day, to be comforted by Ginka. The family express their concerns, especially after it appears Teika and Hyouka are ready for some seriously violent retaliation. The next day Yuuka is confronted by a teenage girl - her biological sister Senko, who has come to take her younger sister back. The truth regarding Yuuka's previous family is revealed. Her family traditionally tortures the weakest daughter of the family to force them to become demons or break them if they don't. Before the situation gets out of hand Ginka appears, and apparently knows Senko. Night comes and the bullies are at it again, this time aided by Senko, who is madder than ever before. Senko claims she needs to be saved too. Ginka's second arrival ends with Senko waking up in the Midarezaki household. Kyouka threatens to kill Senko for being an enemy of the family, but Ouka jumps in and pulls her away. After the family destroys the Himemiya mansion in massive overkill fashion, Senko officially becomes a new addition to the family - Chika Midarezaki.
4	"As Planned, Both a Trip and a Curse"; Transliteration: "Ryokō mo Noroi mo Keikakuteki ni" (Japanese: 旅行も呪いも計画的に)	May 3, 2008
Kyouka discovers that married couples go on honeymoons prior to their marriage, and so, begins to book one, with help from Chika, who sees it as an opportunity for her and Ginka to get together.
5	"Surviving the Honeymoon"; Transliteration: "Sabaibaru Hanemūn" (Japanese: サバイバルハネムーン)	May 10, 2008
Kyouka builds an airport outside of the Midarezaki family household, so the family can head off to the honeymoon without too much fuss. The family become good friends with a boy nicknamed "Pierre", however, their hotel resort is dangerous, and thus, Yuuka is kidnapped by a group of evil monkeys.
6	"Act Two: The Party and the Mad Doctor"; Transliteration: "Kyōki no Hakase to Utage no Ni-maku" (Japanese: 狂気の博士と宴の二幕)	May 17, 2008
The family, in an attempt to save Yuuka, entice the monkeys of the island with free food and a huge party, while Yuuka becomes friends with the mad doctor of the island, who later turns out to be one of Hyouka's many creators.
7	"Thank You! Assassination Chinese Food"; Transliteration: "Shieshie! Ansatsu Chūka" (Japanese: 謝々!暗殺中華)	May 24, 2008
Shu and Tsubaki were born in a family of assassins, however, Shu desperately wants to be a chef. The problem is, his food kills who ever eats it. Fortunately, Yuuka, Tsubaki's classmate, and the rest of her wacky family, are determined to get to the bottom of why the food kills everyone, and make sure that Shu's restaurant lives another day.
8	"The Gentle Death God's Workmanship"; Transliteration: "Yasashii Shinigami no Tsukurikata" (Japanese: やさしい死神の作り方)	May 31, 2008
Ouka is on a date with an old friend of his - a Death God who mercilessly tried to kill him while they were children. Their date is briefly interrupted by Kyouka, and later the rest of the family, while all the cameras that surround them become possessed by a bunny-eared girl called "Odessa Ei".
9	"Banquet for the Gods and Gods of Death"; Transliteration: "Kami to Shinigami no Utage" (Japanese: 神と死神の宴)	June 7, 2008
Kyouka's past is briefly explained in this episode, as Ei brutally tries to kill her and Ouka. At the end of the episode, Ouka is stabbed by the possessed Death God, who reveals an ugly burn on her eye. At the end of the episode, all is well, however, Odessa Ei is somewhere, seeking revenge.
10	"Innocent Pirate Mujaki"; Transliteration: "Mujaki Kaizoku Mujakkī" (Japanese: 無邪気海賊ムジャッキー)	June 14, 2008
Mujaki is a kind pirate, whose deceased father left her a treasure map. Kyouka wants the treasure, however ends up getting kidnapped. The family head out to sea to save Kyouka, but end up getting washed up in a cave, where the treasure is held.
11	"Hyouka's First Love"; Transliteration: "Hyōka no Hatsukoi" (Japanese: 雹霞の初恋)	June 21, 2008
Hyouka meets a girl he called "Musume-san", and the two strike up an unusual friendship. Ginka claims that this must be Hyouka's first love. However, the relationship is threatened, when everyone discovers that Takanashi Yuiko Musume-san's sister was killed by Hyouka, against his will.
12	"Picked up Cat on Monday"; Transliteration: "Getsuyōbi ni Neko o Hirou" (Japanese: 月曜日に猫を拾う)	June 28, 2008
Prior to the beginning of the story, Ginka's next door neighbour picks up a cat, to find that it has turned into a young girl by morning. The episode details their love story, with Ginka as a side character, dressed entirely as a woman through the course of the episode.
13	"The Melancholy of Chika"; Transliteration: "Chika no Yūutsu" (Japanese: 千花の憂鬱)	July 5, 2008
Chika goes to school, however a bunch of classmates ask her help to solve the disappearances of several classmates. Kyouka appears to help and they discover that the reason behind the disappearances was a drug developed by the mafia that turned people into animals. In the end they are saved by a green version of Hyouka and confront the true mastermind of the plan, an experience created by the department of supernatural affairs known as Electric butterfly.
14	"Electric-Butterfly" (Japanese: Electric-Butterfly)	July 12, 2008
The Electric butterfly having planned the catastrophe turning humans into animals, releases Dr. Gebock in order to test the Miderazeki family's potential as a weapon. Hyouka utilizes the Lucifer Cannon to save his family. Chika gets the credit for saving everyone at school.
15	"My Wife is a Magical Girl"; Transliteration: "Okusama wa Majokko" (Japanese: 奥様は魔女っ娘♪)	July 19, 2008
Kyouka clumsily tries to use a magic wand from the Electric Butterfly and punish Ouka for forgetting that it is their anniversary. The wand attacks whoever the person is thinking about with a severity equal to their love however Kyoka ends up zapping everyone but Ouka and in the end she destroys the wand after it tried to kill Ouka.
16	"Red and White Brindle"; Transliteration: "Aka to Shiro no Madara" (Japanese: 朱と白のマダラ)	July 26, 2008
Teika tries to teach a fellow lion that not all humans are evil. Dr. Gebock is back and is now drinking buddies with Ginka at Virgo.
17	"Please use the melon bread for the battle" Transliteration: "Kessen wa Meronpan de Onegai" (Japanese: 決戦はメロンパンでお願い)	August 3, 2008
Teika sacrifices himself to save the female lion Madara from the hunter. Gekka subsequently heals him. The humans and lions negotiate a peace to live alongside the wild animals without hunting each other.
18	"The Correct way to Nurse"; Transliteration: "Tadashii Kanbyō no Shikata" (Japanese: 正しい看病の仕方)	August 10, 2008
When Ouka becomes sick the house falls into chaos without his reason and guidance, so the family track down a mask that might heal Ouka but in the end curses him, so they are forced to shrink and fight his disease from inside his body.
19	"If you want, be a klutz devil" Transliteration: "Sonoki ga Nakutemo Dojidebiru" (Japanese: その気がなくてもドジデビル)	August 17, 2008
A bumbling demon tries to kill the family with a bomb but she has second thoughts when she observes the love the family has. Hyouka must face his feelings for Musume-san once again as she works at the hot spring and sauna. Chika and Ginka engage in S&M in Chika's ongoing quest to turn Ginka heterosexual.
20	"The Forest of Vitamin C"; Transliteration: "Bitamin Shī no Mori" (Japanese: ビタミンCの森)	August 24, 2008
When Chika gets bitten by a hamster she has flashbacks to memories of her first pet, a gigantic demonic monster which is actually just a cursed man. Although Chika tried to use him against the House of Oni he refused. When soldiers attack Chika searching for this monster she finds out there are connections between her first pet and her new best friend Hijiri.
21	"Black Santa is Sleepless in the Night"; Transliteration: "Kuro Santa-san wa Yoru Nemurenai" (Japanese: 黒サンタさんは夜眠れない)	August 30, 2008
When Santa Clause's granddaughter becomes depressed that grandpa never spends Christmas with her Kyouka makes the family deliver presents and take over Santa's duties while she beats Saint Nick into submission to convince him he needs to think of his own family as well as others.
22	"The Princess Who Came Falling"; Transliteration: "Ochitekita Prinsesu" (Japanese: 落ちてきたプリンセス)	September 6, 2008
Electric Butterfly warns the family of an Alien who looks weak but could destroy the world. When a female alien named Oasis comes to earth in search of the meaning of the word Love. The family members try to show her so she will leave but coincidences make everyone think Ouka is having an affair with her.
23	"And His Name is The King of Greed!"; Transliteration: "Sono Na wa Gōyokuō!" (Japanese: その名は強欲王!)	September 13, 2008
Oasis was not who Electric Butterfly was referring to when she talked of a weak looking alien who could destroy the world. So when an alien invasion kicks off and a bumbling lovestruck alien of immense power comes to earth after a millennium of waiting... for Gekka's hand in marriage. Gekka is preoccupied with something else.
24	"The Thing From Space"; Transliteration: "Uchū kara no Buttai X" (Japanese: 宇宙からの物体X)	September 20, 2008
Oasis is revealed to be of a species spawned by Gekka thousands of years ago. Meanwhile Gekka must stop her offspring who want to rebel against her for abandoning them with only the lonely alien as their God. The family meets a worshipper of Kyouka who is unbeknownst to them possessed by a child of Gekka. Chika and Yuuka's big sister is revealed to be Electric Butterfly's boss and declares war on the all-powerful bumbling alien.
25	"Kyōka, Frenzy!"; Transliteration: "Kyōka-Sama, Kyōran!" (Japanese: 凶華様、狂乱!)	September 27, 2008
Since the children of Gekka would die without Gekka they seek to punish her by destroying the family and earth she loves. The family must also stop her bumbling alien from destroying the earth as he is attacked. An evil waterspirit spawn of Gekka possesses Kyouka.
26	"Again, the Legend of Enka"; Transliteration: "Futatabi, Enka Densetsu!" (Japanese: 再び、閻禍伝説!)	October 4, 2008
The family debates who Enka was referring to in her prophecy, and ends up closer than ever, realizing they are a real family by birth or not.
