= List of Hoshizora e Kakaru Hashi episodes =

The following lists the episodes, air dates and summaries of the animated adaption of Hoshizora e Kakaru Hashi.

== Episodes ==
No.	Title	Original release date
1	"If That Were A Bear, It'd All Be Over"; Transliteration: "Kuma Nara, Kokode Owatteta" (Japanese: クマなら、ここで終わってた)	April 11, 2011
A little boy, Kazuma Hoshino, and a girl stand in a forest; the latter of whom is upset that the boy is leaving. The boy cheers her up and promises to stay friends. Kazuma, now a teenager, awakens and finds himself sitting across from his brother Ayumu on a train. As Ayumu gazes out the window in awe, Kazuma is surprised at how much the scene resembles the one in his dream. The boys get off in Yamabiko Town, catching what they believe to be a bus to Yorozuyo Inn, a lodge where they are to live. Having boarded the wrong bus however, Kazuma and Ayumu have no choice but to wait for the correct bus at the next stop. As Ayumu searches for snacks to feed the monkey that appears at the bus stop, the mischievous animal steals his hat and runs off. Kazuma angrily pursues it into the forest. After a prolonged chase Kazuma recovers the hat but finds himself lost. Fortunately, a girl, Ui Nakatsugawa, happens by and guides him in the direction of the bus stop. She crosses a stream by jumping from rock to rock. When Kazuma tries to do to the same his foot slips on the last rock and he knocks Ui over, accidentally kissing her in the process. Having witnessed the incident, Ui's friend, Ibuki Hinata, aggressively sends him on his way. Kazuma rejoins Ayumu at the bus stop and they catch the bus to the inn. Senka Yorozu, their landlady, graciously welcomes them. That night, as he remembers the day's events, Kazuma regrets having not gotten Ui's name. The following morning, their first day of school, Senka introduces the boys to Tsumugi Toudou, a part-time employee at the Inn and their upperclasssman who guides them to campus. When Kazuma is introduced to his new class he finds that an irate Ibuki is in his class. Sitting beside her, Ui waves him a greeting.
2	"It Shouldn't Taste Like Cheese"; Transliteration: "Chīzu no Aji wa Shinai Hazu" (Japanese: チーズの味はしないはず)	April 18, 2011
Ui dreams of herself and brother Hajime, as children, sharing a slice of cheesecake. Hajime wipes a splotch of cream from her cheek and the dream cuts to an image of Kazuma's unintentional kiss by the stream. Ui wakes up in surprise, placing two fingers to her lips. After Kazuma introduces himself to the class he is assigned to sit in the back, directly between Ui and Ibuki. At lunch time he sits down to lunch with the girls and a new acquaintance, Daigo Minamikokubaru, the son of their homeroom teacher. After school, Kazuma and company are joined by Tsumugi. Stopping to collect Ayumu and with him, Kasane Toudou, Tsumugi's youngest sister, they all go on a tour of the town. As they walk around town the group tells the brothers the legend of local mountain, Futagoyama, where Kazuma had gotten lost the previous day. Ayumu notes that this legend bears a resemblance to that of Tanabata. The group continues their tour by stopping at the local Shinto shrine where Kazuma is introduced to the miko, Madoka Komoto. Dumbfounded at the sight of him however, Madoka runs off. As their final destination, the gang visits an ice cream parlor where they share a large parfait. Upon finishing the meal, Kazuma notices and wipes cream from Ui's cheek, causing her to remember her dream of Hajime, much to her embarrassment. That night, while taking a bath, Ui comes to terms with her earlier embarrassment around Kazuma and happily settles into the water.
3	"Acorns Hurt More than You Think"; Transliteration: "Donguri wa Igai to Itai" (Japanese: ドングリは意外と痛い)	April 25, 2011
Kazuma and a girl are playing by a stream in a dream. As the girl finishes making him a necklace out of white clover, Kazuma gives her a ring made out of the same flowers. She happily puts it on; in her room, a sleeping Madoka thanks him. Following an awkward morning and breakfast with Senka, Kazuma and Ayumu head to school with Daigo. As Ui and Ibuki catch up, Kazuma experiences an feeling that he is being watched. Class breaks for lunch; on his way to get food with Daigo, Kazuma experiences the feeling again as a girl hides. Homeroom is let out; as Kazuma leaves with Daigo, he spots the girl and gives chase. He bumps into a startled Madoka who bodyslams him to the floor. The next morning, shooed out of the inn, Kazuma rethinks the incident and goes to the shrine to apologize to Madoka. They make up and Madoka inquires about him and Ui, and is brought to tears upon hearing that they kissed. Watching this from atop a tree and upset that Madoka is crying, the girl who had been spying on Kazuma reveals herself to be Koyori Toudou, Tsumugi's other sister. She pelts Kazuma with acorns, but after Madoka moves to shield him, Koyori leaves. On their way home from school the next day, Ui and Kazuma bump into Ayumu who has developed a slight fever. Kazuma carries him home piggyback and Ui fantasizes about him doing the same for her. Back at the house, after they tuck Ayumu in bed, Kazuma and Ui relax in his room enjoying some tea and daifuku.
4	"Met with a bear and had a chat" Transliteration: "Kuma to Deatte, Hanashi Teta" (Japanese: クマと出会って、話してた)	May 2, 2011
It is lunch time several days later. Desperate for the bathroom, Daigo tosses his lunch to Kazuma, who stumbles backwards into Hina Sakai, a third-year student, knocking both of them over. He apologizes for the mishap and as he returns her cellphone, compliments the cuteness of the ornament dangling from it. Hina mistakes this as ridicule, and snaps at him before storming away. Back in class, Kazuma, Ui, Ibuki and Daigo discuss the upcoming sports festival, specifically the Hikonan Race, a form of triathlon. Since participants in this event must represent a business, Kazuma is informed by Senka upon his return home that he will be entered on behalf of the inn. He heads out for a run to train for the race and finds Koyori up a tree in the park and breaks her fall when she slips off. He then accompanies her to Gengorou Yamakawa, an elderly friend and widower. The man talks of his hospitalized grandson, Keita, awaiting an undisclosed surgery, and asks Koyori to visit him. Back in her room, Hina makes the decision to apologize to Kazuma. Koyori and Gengorou surprise Keita the following day; in an effort to keep his spirits high, Koyori promises to win the Hikonan Race if he will remain optimistic about the surgery. After a brief encounter with Hina, who is unable to apologize, Kazuma finds Madoka at the shrine where she tells him more about the story of Futagoyama.
5	"Red Bean Soup And Eel And Wedding Dress"; Transliteration: "Shiruko to Unagi to Uedingudoresu" (Japanese: しることウナギとウエディングドレス)	May 9, 2011
The sports festival arrives and the group participates in a variety of events; Ui wins a sprint, Hina wins the 100m dash, Tsumugi struggles through an obstacle course and Ibuki demonstrates target archery. After a relaxing lunch with Senka and the Nakatsugawas, Kazuma and Ui prepare for the Hikonan Race. Alongside Hina and Koyori, the gang rush to consume thirty bowls of shiruko, catch ten freshwater eels, and continue to the finish in a random costume. Koyori skillfully makes her way into the lead wearing a wedding gown but trips on the dress, spraining her ankle. Kazuma, wearing a tuxedo, catches up to Koyori and failing to convince her to forfeit, picks her up in his arms and carries her to the finish, allowing her to place her first. Back at the hospital, Gengorou and Keita watch on television as Koyori proclaims to them that she has fulfilled her promise.
6	"When the Bucket Drops"; Transliteration: "Oke ga Ochiru Toki" (Japanese: 桶が落ちるとき)	May 16, 2011
At school the next morning, Kazuma, Ibuki, Ui and Daigo, in preparation for finals, arrange a study group at the inn. After five and a half hours of studying, the group takes a break to bathe and watch the fireflies. The scene reminds Ui of when she was very young and Hajime announced that he was getting married which did not go over well with her. After dinner, the group turns in for the night and Kazuma bumps into Ui on his way back from the bathroom. The two sit outside and share a plate of onigiri as they discuss Futagoyama. Waking up to find Ui missing, Madoka peers out one of the windows and is disheartened to see her and Kazuma standing together.
7	"The Pink Nyanbobo"; Transliteration: "Pinku no Nyanbobo" (Japanese: ピンクのにゃんぼぼ)	May 23, 2011
With finals over, everyone save for Ibuki and Ayumu plans a trip to Honchou, a nearby metropolis, to celebrate. When the bus service is delayed, they go to an arcade to pass time. Having stayed at school to practice, Ibuki finds it difficult to concentrate with Kazuma on her mind. The group assembles the following week to watch her participate in a nationwide target archery competition; despite making it to the finals, Ibuki is eliminated. Kazuma finds the distraught girl at the overlook and cheers her up.
8	"Butt in with OO (blank)!" Transliteration: "Tsukkomi wa Maru Maru de!" (Japanese: ツッコミは◯◯（マルマル）で!)	May 30, 2011
Kazuma calls up each of the group the next morning, inviting them to visit the beach with him the following Wednesday. Everyone agrees, and the gang spends a fun and exciting day playing in the sand and in the water. Madoka takes the opportunity to ask Ui about her relationship with Kazuma, and is relieved to hear that she considers him more of an older brother than a love-interest. Finishing up their stay with a game of suikawari and volleyball, the group heads home at sunset. On their walk back home together, Ui asks Ibuki about her and Kazuma.
9	"Yellow Jackets Are Diuranal"; Transliteration: "Suzumebachi wa Chiyūkousei" (Japanese: スズメバチは昼行性)	June 6, 2011
On his way back home from a meetup with Daigo, Kazuma sees Hina at the park and as they talk, she collapses from hunger. Kazuma buys her some fast food and she explains that she has run away from home after her most recent fight with her father. Since she is without money or a change of clothing, Kazuma sneaks her into his room at Yorozuyo Inn. Senka discovers them the following morning but agrees to house Hina in exchange for housekeeping. News of this reaches her father, and following a failed attempt to extradite his daughter, Kazuma is challenged to tug-of-war in her name. The battle is fierce and close, but thanks to no small measure of luck, Kazuma wins.
10	"A Ring, Floating..."; Transliteration: "Yubiwa, Nagarete..." (Japanese: 指輪、流れて...)	June 13, 2011
Having been absent from the shrine at the time, Madoka is brought up to speed about the tug-of-war, and mistakenly believes it to have been a proposal to Hina. Koyori, also home from vacation, visits Madoka and, hearing of the tug-of-war from her, rushes away to find Kazuma. She finds him in the company of the others and confronts him about his apparent proposal, surprising everyone. After Kazuma explains the situation Daigo becomes convinced that Madoka must like Kazuma and recruits the help of the girls to orchestrate a date for them at an amusement park. The couple spends an enjoyable day there, so much so that Madoka invites Kazuma on a picnic the next morning. The following day, as the two of them get settled by the stream, Kazuma places Madoka's windblown hat back onto her head and realizes she is the girl from his childhood. after the credits Madoka is seen placing the flower ring she received from Kazuma in the stream, and watching as her feelings were swept away.
11	"Wet From The Rain"; Transliteration: "Ame ni Furarete" (Japanese: 雨にふられて)	June 20, 2011
While walking to school together, Daigo reiterates his discontent that Kazuma rejected Madoka. As Kazuma tries to explain otherwise, Madoka happily catches up to them. Ibuki and Ui walk home together after class and Ibuki neutrally warns Ui that unless she confesses to Kazuma soon, someone else might, herself included. That night, as both girls ponder the conversation, Ayumu calls Ui and asks if she will model for him the next day. Having been shooed out of the Inn, Kazuma decides to visit the shopping district, where he bumps into Ibuki. The two go to Honchou together and spend the day playing arcade games, trying on clothes, dining, and singing karaoke. Back at the house, Ayumu takes a break and sits with Ui who is surprised to learn that the drawing is a gift for Kazuma, as he believes they're dating. As evening closes in, Ui says her farewells and walks home, upset. Sitting at the park, Ibuki happily thanks Kazuma for an enjoyable outing, jokingly describes the two of them as a couple and though serious, playfully asks him out. He turns down the offer and leaves; though a minute or so later, he runs back to apologize. Fighting the urge to cry, Ibuki, heartbroken, maintains that her offer was a joke and returns home as rainclouds drench her. Having returned home, Ui thinks back on her behavior when her brother married and calls him. To her surprise, she learns that his wife, Kuriko, is pregnant. Early the following morning Ibuki heads to the overlook to vent about Kazuma. As she heads to school, Ui catches up to her, overjoyed that she is going to be an aunt.
12	"A Starry Bridge in the Night Sky"; Transliteration: "Yozora ni Kakaru Hoshi no Hashi" (Japanese: 夜空に架かる星の橋)	June 27, 2011
Sitting with the boys at breakfast, Senka informs Kazuma that as the winner of the Hikonan Race, he is to play the Ogami^{[a]} in the upcoming festival's Futagoyama ceremony. Though reluctant, he agrees. On his way to school, Daigo encourages him to use the opportunity to get with Tsumugi, the Megami,^{[b]} and by extension, the prettiest girl in town. Ibuki happily catches up to them as Ui bashfully approaches; a silence drawn between herself and Kazuma. Class over for the day, Ui and Kazuma go to the shrine to practice for the ceremony in awkward silence. Having sensed something during dress rehearsal, Tsumugi discusses Ui's recent behavior around Kazuma with her; despite Ui's efforts to cover up and derail the topic, Tsumugi finds it to be nothing short of love. The day of the ceremony arrives. As the girls put on their costumes, Tsumugi collapses and complains of abdominal pain, asking Ui to take her place as the Megami. Kazuma is driven on a float to one end of a bridge above the iconic stream. In the distance, Ui is wheeled to the other side of the bridge. Caught off guard and with nowhere to go, Kazuma gazes at her speechless as the town stares in awe. His emotions build to an unbearable level, and deviating from the plan, shouts at the top of his lungs that he is in love with her. Following some persuasion from Ibuki, Ui reciprocates. That evening, an afterparty is held at the inn. In the back, Ibuki and Madoka come to terms with being rejected, as Kazuma and Ui kiss under the Milky Way.
13	"Mountable? Bridge of Love at School Festival"; Transliteration: "Kakaru ka? Gakuen-sai ni Koi no Hashi" (Japanese: 架かるか？学園祭に恋の橋)	

== Footnotes ==
a. The god as described in the story's Futagoyama legend.
b. The goddess as described in the story's Futagoyama legend.
