= Suika =

Suika (西瓜/すいか; watermelon) may refer to:

- Arūnas Šuika (born 1970), Lithuanian international footballer
- Suika (2001 video game), by Circus
- Suika (Dr. Stone), a character in the manga series Dr. Stone
- Suika Ibuki, a character in Immaterial and Missing Power from the Touhou Project series
- Suika Game, a 2021 merging puzzle game popularized in 2023

== See also ==
- Suica, a Japanese contactless smart card
- Suikawari, a Japanese game involving watermelons
- Sukia, an Italian comic book series
