= List of Ranma ½ chapters =

Volume 1 cover of the 2003 edition released by Viz Media

Ranma ½ is a Japanese manga series written and illustrated by Rumiko Takahashi. Published by Shogakukan, it was serialized in Weekly Shōnen Sunday magazine from August 1987 to March 1996. The story revolves around a teenage boy named Ranma Saotome who has trained in martial arts since early childhood. As a result of an accident during a training journey, he is cursed to become a girl when splashed with cold water, while hot water changes him back into a boy. Throughout the series Ranma seeks out a way to rid himself of his curse, while his friends, enemies and many fiancées constantly hinder and interfere.

Shortly after serialization began, Shogakukan began collecting the chapters into tankōbon format. 38 volumes were released between April 1988 and June 1996, just three months after the final chapter was serialized in Weekly Shōnen Sunday. Between April 2002 and October 2003, Shogakukan re-released Ranma ½ in a 38 volume shinsōban edition, with new cover art. A B6-sized edition of the series was published in 20 volumes between July 2016 and January 2018.

In the early 1990s, Viz Media licensed Ranma ½ for English release in North America. They published the manga in a monthly comic book format that contained two chapters each issue from June 1992 to 2003; the last being Part 12, Issue 1. Their English release "flipped" the images to read left-to-right, causing the art to be mirrored. Viz also periodically published the chapters into a graphic novel format, similar to the Japanese tankōbon, with 21 volumes released between May 1993 and January 2003.

Having earlier ceased publication of all manga in the comic book format, Viz posted a press release on March 18, 2004, announcing that they were changing their graphic novel format and would reprint all earlier volumes to match. However, the reprints of Ranma ½ actually began in 2003. Starting with volume 22, the content of this "second edition" remained the same, with mirrored art, but moved to a smaller format with different covers and a price drop. The 36th and final volume was released on November 14, 2006. In 2013, Viz Media announced that they would be re-releasing Ranma ½ in a "2-in-1 edition" that combines two individual volumes into a single large one. For the first time in English, this edition restores the original art and right-to-left reading order. 19 volumes were released between March 11, 2014, and March 14, 2017.

== Tankōbon edition ==
No.	Japanese release date	Japanese ISBN
1	March 18, 1988	4-09-122031-2
001. "Here's Ranma" (らんまが来た, Ranma ga Kita); 002. "Ranma's Secret" (らんまの秘密, Ranma no Himitsu); 003. "I Hate Men!" (男なんか大っ嫌い, Otoko nanka Daikkirai); 004. "Never, Never, Never" (断じて認めん, Danjite Mitomen); 005. "To the Tree-Borne Kettle-Girl" (木の上のヤカンの女へ, Ki no Ue no Yakan no Onna e); 006. "Body and Soul" (心も体も, Kokoro mo Karada mo); 007. "You'll Understand Soon Enough" (すぐにわかるよ, Sugu ni Wakaru yo); 008. "Because There's a Girl He Likes" (好きな女がいるんだから, Suki na Hito ga Irun Dakara)
Genma Saotome returns to Japan from a fateful martial arts training trip to the Jusenkyo springs with his son Ranma in which the former is cursed to transform into a panda and the latter into a teenage girl when splashed with cold water. Hot water reverses the effect. They move in with Genma's old friend Soun Tendo, at his Nerima, Tokyo home, with the expectation that one of his three daughters will marry Ranma. The eldest Kasumi and elder Nabiki force their little sister Akane to accept the betrothal. Akane and Ranma instantly dislike each other due to Akane's mistrust of boys and Ranma's curse. Ranma enrolls in Furinkan High School where he meets Tatewaki Kuno, the arrogant captain of the kendo club and the one who spread the rumor that Akane will date any boy who defeats her in combat. Kuno mistakes Ranma's female form as a separate person and falls in love with her. Though he easily defeats Kuno a number of times, Ranma sustains injuries as he attempts to hide his curse. Over the course of several visits to Dr. Tofu's medical clinic, Ranma discovers that Akane has a crush on the doctor.
2	April 18, 1988	4-09-122032-0
009. "You're Cute When You Smile" (笑うとかわいいよ, Warau to kawaii yo); 010. "The Hunter" (乱馬を追って来た男, Ranma wo otte kita otoko); 011. "Bread Feud" (対決, Taiketsu); 012. "Showdown" (続・対決, Zoku taiketsu); 013. "A Bad Cut" (けがはなくとも, Kega wa naku to mo); 014. "Who Says You're Cute" (かわいくねえ, Kawaikunē); 015. "The Transformation of Ryoga" (良牙変身, Ryōga henshin); 016. "He's Got a Beef" (恨んで当然, Urande tōzen); 017. "Kodachi, The Black Rose" (黒バラの小太刀, Kuro bara no Kodachi)
Dr. Tofu, on the other hand, is so madly in love with Kasumi that he absent-mindedly injures his patients when in her presence. Ranma cheers Akane up over this fact by noting "you're cute when you smile". After weeks of being perpetually lost, Ryoga Hibiki arrives at Furinkan to take revenge on Ranma for always nabbing the last cafeteria bread in middle school. Over the course of their fight, one of Ryoga's razor sharp bandanas cuts off Akane's long hair, a symbol of her affection for Dr. Tofu. Akane decides to keep her hair short, having gotten over her schoolgirl crush on the doctor. Later, Ranma discovers the real reason for Ryoga's hatred: Ryoga also gained a curse while following Ranma and Genma, turning into a small black piglet. Akane takes a liking to the piglet, not knowing his true identity, and nicknames him P-chan. While in town, Ranma meets Kuno's sister Kodachi, a rhythmic gymnast who has been sabotaging the Furinkan gymnastics team before the "rhythmic gymnastic wrestling" match. The injured Furinkan girls ask Akane to take their place. Ryoga offers to train her when she appears to lack the necessary grace for the sport.
3	June 18, 1988	4-09-122033-9
018. "The Love of the Black Rose" (黒バラの恋, Kuro bara no koi); 019. "Take Care of My Sister" (妹をよろしく, Imōto wo yoroshiku); 020. "I'll See That You Lose" (負けてもらうぜ, Makete morau ze); 021. "Hot Competition" (熱闘新体操, Netto shintaisō); 022. "I Give Up" (あきらめますわ, Akiramemasu wa); 023. "Darling Charlotte" (愛しのシャルロット, Itoshi no Sharurotto); 024. "A Kiss in the Rink" (リンクにくちづけ, Rinku ni kuchiduke); 025. "Lips at a Loss" (戸惑うくちびる, Tomadō kuchibiru); 026. "Lips at War" (リップ・バトル, Rippu batoru)
In trying to apprehend P-chan, Ranma inadvertently catches the attention of Kodachi, who had been trying to ambush Akane as well. Kodachi soon mirrors Kuno's delusion, loving the male Ranma and loathing the female. Kodachi declares that the winner of the gymnastics match will get to date Ranma. Akane manages to evade all of Kodachi's subsequent tricks but sprains her ankle on the night before the match, forcing a female Ranma to go in her place. At the start of the competition, Kodachi chains P-chan to Ranma's arm and uses a variety of rule-bending weapons to rig the match. Ranma forces a ring-out by attacking the post beneath Kodachi, winning the fight for Furinkan. At an ice rink, P-chan is kidnapped by a martial arts skater and renamed "Charlotte". The skater, Azusa Shiratori, and her pair skating partner Mikado Sanzenin challenge Ranma and Akane to a martial skating battle over ownership of the piglet. While practicing, Mikado steals Ranma's first kiss, which infuriates him so much that they go one-on-one. Ranma barely beats Mikado but takes his strongest attack in the process. Just before the actual match, Mikado declares that he will kiss Akane over the course of the fight.
4	August 18, 1988	4-09-122034-7
027. "I'll Never Let Go" (この手ははなさない, Kono te ha hanasanai); 028. "Burning the Bridges" (背水の陣, Haisui no jin); 029. "Ryoga Explodes!" (良牙爆発, Ryoga shakuhatsu); 030. "The Waters of Love" (愛の水柱, Ai no mizusbashira); 031. "Kiss of Death" (死の接吻, Shi no seppun); 032. "You I Love" (我愛ニー, Wō ai nii); 033. "Akane Gets Shampooed" (あかねVS.シャンプー, Akane VS. Shanpū); 034. "Shampoo Cleans Up" (必殺シャンプー, Hissatsu Shanpū); 035. "Formula #911" (ブレンドナンバー119, Burendo Nanbā 199); 036. "Bie Liao (Goodbye)" (別了（ビエラ）, Bie ra)
Azusa and Mikado try to break the trust between Ranma and Akane with their "Couple Cleaver", but Ranma foils the attack. Ryoga attempts to swap in for Ranma but finds himself paired with female Ranma instead. Azusa and Mikado attempt another Couple Cleaver which easily splits the rivals-turned-pair partners. Ryoga destroys the rink in anger only to find cold water underneath. Fearing transforming before Akane's eyes, Ryoga quickly dispatches the opposing skaters and continues his fight with Ranma over Akane. Akane nearly drowns trying to stop their fighting. As she recovers, a Chinese Amazon warrior named Shampoo barges in trying to kill Ranma. She seeks revenge for dishonoring her in front of her village and gave female Ranma the "kiss of death". Back at the Tendo dojo, Ranma defeats Shampoo as a male, which acts as a marriage proposal, according to Amazon law. During Shampoo and Akane's fight over Ranma, Shampoo uses a special shampoo to make her selectively forget about Ranma. Ranma attempts to get the cure from Shampoo but ultimately breaks the spell by insulting Akane until she remembers. Ranma reveals his curse to Shampoo which confuses her enough to make her return to China.
5	October 18, 1988	4-09-122035-5
037. "Looking For a Weak Spot" (弱点さがし, Jakuten sagashi); 038. "Weak Spot—Found" (弱点みつけた, Jakuten mitsuketa); 039. "Cat Hell" (猫地獄への招待, Neko jigoku he no shōtai); 040. "Cat-Fu" (猫拳パニック, Neko-ken panikku); 041. "You'd Have Kissed Anybody?" (誰でもよかったの, Dare demo yokatta no); 042. "Shampoo Rides Again" (シャンプー再来日, Shanpū sairainichi); 043. "Attack of the Wild Mousse" (ムース襲来, Mūsu shūrai); 044. "The Martial Arts Magic Show" (格闘演芸会, Kakutō engei-kai); 045. "Cat's Tongue Got You?" (猫舌やぶり, Neko shita yaburi); 046. "The Phoenix Pill" (秘薬THE不死鳥丸, Hiyaku THE fushichō-gan); 047. "All's Fair at the Fair" (夜店でバトル, Yomise de batoru)
Kuno hires Hikaru Gosunkugi, a fan of the occult, to discover Ranma's weak spot. The Tendos learn that he has a fear of cats, as a result of his father's "cat-fist" training. This secret technique causes Ranma to become feral when exposed to too many cats. Gosunkugi triggers this state, not knowing its fearsome power, and Ranma goes on a rampage. Akane calms him down with catnip which leads to their first kiss. Shampoo returns from China with a curse as well, hers to turn into a kitten. She opens a ramen shop with her great-grandmother Cologne, a master of traditional Chinese medicine, shiatsu, and moxibustion techniques. They are joined by the hidden weapons master Mousse, a male Amazon competing for Shampoo's affection. Cologne strikes a pressure point on Ranma's body, causing him to become hypersensitive to heat, which prevents him from reversing his curse. Ranma takes a job at Shampoo's restaurant in order to get the Phoenix Pill, a cure for the pressure point. In order to gain enough speed to snatch the pill from Cologne, Ranma must master the Chestnuts Roasting on an Open Fire technique—to grab chestnuts out of a fire without getting burned. Ranma succeeds by training on piranhas at a festival but fails to get the pill.
6	December 13, 1988	4-09-122036-3
048. "War of the Melons" (スイカ割りバトル, Suika wari batoru); 049. "Naval Engagement" (婿とりマリンウォーズ, Muko tori marin wōzu); 050. "Kitten of the Sea" (突撃 シー・キャット, Totsugeki shii kyatto); 051. "Care to Join Me?" (わしと組まんか, Washito kumima n ka); 052. "Training Meals" (修行DEディナー, Shugyou DE dinā); 053. "The Breaking Point" (爆砕点穴, Bakusai tenketsu); 054. "The Immortal Man" (不死身の男, Fujimi no otoko); 055. "Fast Break" (爆砕勝負, Bakusai shoubu); 056. "The Way of Tea" (格闘茶道どす, Kakutō sadō dosu); 057. "Meet Miss Satsuki" (茶月はんどす, Satsuki ha n dosu); 058. "Proposal Accepted" (縁談成立どす, Endan seiritsu dosu)
Ranma chases Cologne to the beach where he competes in a melon-splitting race with the pill as a prize. The race ends with a one-on-one fight between Cologne and Ranma. Ranma uses Shampoo to activate his cat-fist, ending the fight and earning the pill. Ryoga accepts training from Cologne when he discovers how skilled Ranma has become. Ranma, Genma, and Akane also go training in the same mountains where they learn of Akane's severe inability to cook. Akane observes Cologne teaching the Breaking Point technique, which can shatter rocks with a single poke. On the other hand, Ranma trains by fighting bees, which turns his Chestnuts Roasting on an Open Fire into a series of hundreds of lightning fast punches. Ryoga exhibits superhuman endurance in their fight as a result of his training, forcing Ranma to end the match quickly with his hundred fists. Later, Ranma is kidnapped by Sentaro Daimonji, a master of martial arts tea ceremony. In order to nullify his betrothal to a monkey, Daimonji must find someone who can defeat it in a tea ceremony battle. Ranma agrees and fights the monkey, who turns out to be the real betrothed's pet. Daimonji marries happily and leaves for his honeymoon.
7	May 18, 1989	4-09-122037-1
059. "It's Fast or It's Free" (格闘出前レース, Kakutō demae rēsu); 060. "Eyes On the Prize" (ゴールをめざせ, Gōru wo mezase); 061. "Noodles, Anyone?" (召しませ ラーメン, Meshimase rāmen); 062. "I Won't Eat It!" (食ってたまるか, Kutte tamaru ka); 063. "The Evil Wakes" ("邪悪"の復活, "Jāku" no fukkatsu); 064. "He's Something Else" (ただ者ではない, Tada mono dehanai); 065. "Bathhouse Battle" (バトル・ザ・銭湯, Batoru ze sentō); 066. "Moonlight Serenade" (ムーンライト ボンバー, Mūnraito bonbā); 067. "The Wrath of Happosai" (八宝斉 怒る, Happosai ikaru); 068. "The Scent of a Woman" (効きます 女嫌香, Kikimasu nyokenko); 069. "Fathers Know Best" (親父の逆襲, Oyaji no gyakushu)
Ranma, Akane, and Shampoo enter the Miss Martial Arts Takeout contest, attempting to deliver an order to the designated house first—Kuno's. The race ends in a three-way tie between them, leading to the next event: feeding the host. Ranma wins by feeding his takeout to Kuno. Later, Soun and Genma's perverted old master Happosai returns after having been sealed under a boulder for ten years. Happosai begins terrorizing the local women, disrupting the girls' gym period and a local bathhouse. He also goes on a lingerie-stealing spree, which Ranma and Genma stop, invoking his ire. Happosai takes his revenge by pulling an unending series of pranks. Ranma has Akane sew a woman-repelling odor patch into Happosai's clothes, depriving him of the female contact that powers his chi. Drained of his energy source, Happosai is defeated.
8	August 18, 1989	4-09-122038-X
070. "Instant Spring" (即席男溺泉, Sokuseki Nanniichuan); 071. "No Need for Ranma" (助太刀無用, Sukedachi muyo); 072. "The Destroyer Strikes" (恐怖、看板男, Kyofu, kanban otoko); 073. "Just One More Kiss" (ワンモア キッス, Wan moa kissu); 074. "Wherefore Art Thou, Romeo?" (バトルロイヤル・ロミオ, Batoru roiyaru Romeo); 075. "Romeo? Romeo? Romeo!?" (おれがロミオだ, Ore ga Romeo da); 076. "Not Your Typical Juliet" (ジュリエット ゲーム, Juliet gemu); 077. "A Kiss to the Victor" (勝利のキッス, Shori no kissu); 078. "Quest for the Hidden Spring" (めざせ、和風男溺泉, Mezase, wafu Nanniichuan); 079. "The Trouble with Girls' Locker Rooms" (女子更衣室の罠, Joshi koishitsu no wana); 080. "From the Spring, Springs a Message" (和風男溺泉からのお知らせ, Wafu Nanniichuan kara no o shirase)
A challenger appears to take the Tendo dojo's sign and Shampoo appears with "Instant Spring of Drowned Man" powder, which might cure Ranma's condition. Ranma agrees to a date with Shampoo in exchange for the powder on the same day that the dojo challenge is to occur, forcing Akane to defend the dojo on her own. Ranma is too distracted during Shampoo's date and ends up returning to the dojo to help defeat the challenger. Ranma swipes the powder from Shampoo but it turns out to be one-time use and not a true cure. Later, the drama club casts Akane as Juliet in their production of Romeo and Juliet, with Kuno, Gosunkugi, and Happosai competing for the role of Romeo. Ranma joins in when he discovers the community theater prize to be an "invitation to see China". Ranma is unable to complete the dramatic kissing scene and instead attempts to play the part of Juliet. This ploy fails and he returns to his Romeo costume to finish the play, kissing Akane with the help of some tape over his mouth. They win the trip to see Xian "China" Li, a Chinese actor. Ryoga finds a map to a Japanese Spring of Drowned Man, which is located underneath the girl's locker room, guarded vigorously by Akane and her classmates. Unfortunately, the spring is no longer functional, depriving Ranma and Ryoga of another cure.
9	November 18, 1989	4-09-122039-8
081. "The Way the Cookie Crumbles" (黒バラクッキー, Kuro bara kukki); 082. "Negative Feelings" (ネバー ギブアップ, Nega gibuappu); 083. "Take Me Out to the Bathtub" (私をお風呂につれてって, Watashi o ofuro ni tsurete tte); 084. "...I Ate the Whole Thing" (全部食っちゃうぞ, Zenbu kutchau zo); 085. ""Okonomiyaki" Means "I Love You"" (お好み焼きの右京, Okonomiyaki no Ukyō); 086. "Saucy Reply" (お好みデスマッチ, Okonomi desumatchi); 087. "Ukyo's Secret" (右京の正体, Ukyo no shotai); 088. "Ryoga vs. Ukyo" (良牙VS.右京, Ryōga vs. Ukyō); 089. "Love Letters in the Sauce" (完璧なラブレター, Kanpeki na rabureta); 090. "Ryoga's What?!" (私は良牙の許婚, Watashi wa Ryōga no iinazuke); 091. "At Long Last...the Date!" (憧れのデート, Akogare no deto)
Kodachi and Akane bake cookies for Ranma in home economics class. Kodachi steals Akane's cookies and Ranma is photographed in a compromising position while trying to retrieve them. In order to retrieve the negatives, he ventures to the Kuno residence where they are guarded by a pet alligator and an electrocuting collar. He destroys the negatives and escapes with Akane's help, though Akane's cooking has not been improved by Kasumi's training. In school, a new student named Ukyo Kuonji transfers in with a specialty in martial arts okonomiyaki cooking. Ukyo holds a grudge against Ranma and Genma for stealing the family okonomiyaki cart many years ago and challenges Ranma to a duel. During their battle, Ranma discovers that Ukyo is a woman and also his fiancée—the okonomiyaki cart was to be the dowry, but Genma escaped without taking Ukyo. However, Ukyo forgives Ranma when she observes him and Akane not getting along, seeing a chance to fulfill her marriage promise. To that end, she sets Ryoga up on a date with Akane. Ranma attempts to sabotage the date by disguising himself as "Ryoga's fiancée" to varying degrees of success.
10	March 17, 1990	4-09-122040-1
092. "Happosai Days Are Here Again" (ハッピーとコロン, Happy to Cologne); 093. "One Moment to Love" (一瞬の恋, Isshun no koi); 094. "I Won't Fall in Love" (誰が惚れるか, Dare ga horeru ka); 095. "Abduction of...Akane?" (さらわれたあかね, Sarawareta Akane); 096. "Duck, Ranma, Duck!" (乱馬アヒル化計画, Ranma ahiru ka keikaku); 097. "Akane Becomes a Duck" (あかねアヒルになる, Akane ahiru ni naru); 098. "Fowl Play" (がんばれムース, Ganbare Mousse); 099. "The Happiest Mousse" (ムースのしあわせ, Mousse no shiawase); 100. "Tsubasa Kurenai Busts Loose!" (突撃！紅つばさ, Totsugeki! Kurenai Tsubasa); 101. "Lunchtime Lunacy" (突撃！ランチタイム, Totsugeki! Ranchitaimu); 102. "The Perfect Match" (突撃！正しいデート, Totsugeki! Tadashii deto)
The family goes to the beach where Happosai continues his dirty escapades. Ranma introduces him to Cologne, though they had already met many years previous. Happosai had stolen a bracelet containing three love pills from Cologne's village. The third and most dangerous pill induces love for a lifetime. Akane inadvertently swallows the lifetime pill and Ranma tries to prevent her from seeing any men. She regurgitates it before any lasting harm is done. At another festival, Mousse returns to defeat Ranma, having gained a cold water curse as well. Mousse fell into the Spring of Drowned Duck and brought some of its water with him in order to humiliate Ranma. He kidnaps Akane and threatens her with the water but fails to curse anyone before running out. In a later duel, Ranma attempts to throw the match and let Mousse date Shampoo but his pride would not let him. Shampoo takes Mousse in out of pity. Back at school, a master of disguise named Tsubasa Kurenai appears to take revenge on Ranma for his engagement to Ukyo. Ranma and Tsubasa have an okonomiyaki selling match to prove who's more attractive. When Tsubasa falls for female Ranma, he finds out that Tsubasa is actually a cross-dresser, which explains his love for Ukyo.
11	May 18, 1990	4-09-122431-8
103. "Ryoga, Come Home" (良牙 家に帰る, Ryoga ie ni kaeru); 104. "Oh, Brother" (おかえりなさい おにちゃん, Okaeri nasai oniichan); 105. "Get Lost, Yoiko!" (迷子の良い子, Maigo no Yoiko); 106. "The Ultimate Technique" (まぼろしの奥義, Maboroshi no ogi); 107. "Get the Secret Scroll!" (秘伝書を奪え, Hidensho o ubae); 108. "The Fire-Burst of Terror!" (炸裂!!八宝大華輪, Sakuretsu!! happo-dai-karin); 109. "Embraceable You" (抱きしめずにはいられない, Dakishimezu ni wa irarenai); 110. "Hold Me Close" (抱きしめてTONIGHT, Dakishimete Tounaito); 111. "Akane's Power-Up!" (あかね パワーアップ, Akane Pawa Appu); 112. "Super Badminton" (剛力羽根つき, Goriki hanetsuki); 113. "Serious Side Effects" (副作用の悲劇, Serious Side Effects)
Ryoga shows Akane his family's new puppies by tricking Ranma into leading him home. Ranma attempts to disrupt their alone time by posing as Ryoga's sister "Yoiko". Ryoga's big brother instinct quickly becomes stifling as Ranma tries increasingly desperate means to escape until he is finally revealed. Back at the dojo, Happosai attempts to remember his ultimate technique, the Happo-Fire Burst. The scroll depicting the technique is buried under a boulder at a women's hot spring. Happosai recovers the scroll but finds that he can no longer read his own handwriting. However, after taking a beating from Ranma, he remembers that the technique merely consists of throwing fireworks at his enemies. Later, Shampoo purchases a kairaishi mushroom from a merchant. This hypnotic fungus causes its victim to perform a specified action when exposed to a trigger. A seasonal cold ruins Shampoo's scheme by making Ranma hug anyone who sneezes instead of her intended trigger. Akane misunderstands Ranma's actions as she continually sneezes from her cold. Thankfully, the effects wear off during the night. On New Year's Eve, Happosai makes a bowl of Super Soba noodles, which grant invincibility. Akane eats them first by accident and uses her new-found strength to challenge Shampoo to martial arts badminton. Akane refuses the antidote until she discovers the side effect—growing whiskers.
12	July 18, 1990	4-09-122432-6
114. "The Return of the Principal" (帰ってきた校長, Kaette kita kocho); 115. "Journey Into the Principal's Office" (冒険！校長室, Boken! kocho shitsu); 116. "The Principal of the Thing" (校長の息子, Kocho no musuko); 117. "One Hairy Day" (みんな危機一髪, Minna kiki ippatsu); 118. "Shear Folly" (一髪逆転, Ippatsu gyakuten); 119. "Gonna Make You Tardy!" (遅刻させまーす, Chikoku sasema su); 120. "The Soap of Happiness" (幸福の抗水セッケン, Shiawase no kosui sekken); 121. "Cupids, Draw Back Your Bow" (キューピッドの罠, Cupid no wana); 122. "Don't Follow Me" (ついてこないで, Tsuite konaide); 123. "Who Do You Love?" (どっちが大切？, Dotchi ga taisetsu?); 124. "Give Me a Little Hug" (愛のさば折り, Ai no saba ori)
The principal of Furinkan returns after a lengthy stay in Hawaii, studying American public education. He institutes a strict haircut policy for the students to great protest. The students venture into the principal's jungle-themed office to retrieve the "pardon slip" which will nullify the rule. They discover that Kuno is the principal's son after he requests they find the boy in exchange for the slip. After a sufficient beating, Principal Kuno relents and rescinds the rule. The principal's next scheme is to punish all who arrive late for school with toilet cleaning duty. He tries to force Ranma into tardiness but finds himself outside school grounds when the bell rings. At the public bathhouse, Ryoga inadvertently uses Shampoo's waterproof soap and finds himself unaffected by cold water. Shampoo and Ranma try to steal it back by setting him on a fake date with Akane. Their constant impulsiveness prevents any of their schemes from working. Just as Ranma retrieves the soap, he finds that it wears off over time and loses interest.
13	November 17, 1990	4-09-122433-4
125. "The Legendary Moxibustion of Evil" (伝説の邪灸, Densetsu no jakyu); 126. "The World's Weakest Man" (最弱の男, Saijaku no otoko); 127. "Weak for Life?!" (乱馬 再起不能!?, Ranma saiki funo!?); 128. "The Valley of Moxibustion" (風雲お灸の里, Fuun okyu no sato); 129. "Training in the Spiral of Hell" (特訓!! 螺旋地獄, Tokkun!! Rasen jigoku); 130. "The Inflammable Man" (燃えない男, Moenai otoko); 131. "The Roar of Heaven" (炸裂!? 飛竜昇天破, Sakuretsu!? Hiryu shoten ha); 132. "The Great Rematch" (いくぞ！ 雪辱戦, Iku zo! setsujoku-sen); 133. "St. Happosai" (仏の八宝斉, Hotoke no Happosai); 134. "Burn, Happy, Burn" (燃えろ！ 八宝斉, Moero! Happosai); 135. "The Paper Chase" (ああ！ 無情の紙吹雪, Aa! Mujo no kami fubuki)
Happosai burns Ranma with the "Ultimate Weakness Moxibustion", reducing his strength to that of a baby. Ranma goes on a training trip to gain the power to defeat Happosai, who has the chart which might cure the moxibustion. Cologne offers to teach him the Heaven-Blast of the Dragon, a technique which uses the opponent's power against him. The key to the technique is maintaining a "body and soul of ice" while drawing one's enraged opponents into a spiral, then finally striking the center. The vortex of hot and cold auras rise up and create a tornado, which is the source of the technique's power. Ranma learns the move in three days with Ryoga's help, intuiting the last step because Cologne neglected to teach it to him. Ranma returns to Nerima to confront Happosai who stubbornly refuses to manifest the battle aura necessary for the attack. Ranma resorts to taking photos of his female self in lingerie in order to provoke Happosai into giving off heat. Kuno, Mousse, and Principal Kuno join in on the fight, creating an even more massive tornado when Ranma unleashes his chi. Akane is caught in the blast as well, trying to recover the moxibustion chart that Happosai dropped. Ranma ventures into the twister to save her.
14	April 18, 1991	4-09-122434-2
136. "Ranma Reborn" (乱馬 復活!!, Ranma Fukkatsu!!); 137. "Who Will Bell the Cat?" (怪談 猫魔鈴, Kaidan Mao Mo Rin); 138. "Kitty Takes a Bride" (恐怖 化け猫の花嫁, Kyofu bake neko no hanayome); 139. "Swim Like a Hammer" (特訓！ ハンマー・ガール, Tokkun! Hanma garu); 140. "Courage Under Water" (水の中の根性, Mizu no naka no konjo); 141. "Step Outside" (おもてに出やがれ！, Omote ni deyagare!); 142. "The Mark of the Gods" (神秘の拳印, Shinpi no kenin); 143. "Face Off!" (鉄壁！ ラクガキ・パワー, Teppeki! rakugaki pawa); 144. "The Mark of the Pig" (追いつめられた良牙, Oitsumerareta Ryoga); 145. "Akane Guesses the Secret!" (そして拳印は消えた, Soshite kenin wa kieta); 146. "Santa's Little Disciples" (サンタクロースの弟子, Santa Claus no deshi)
Ranma uses Happosai as a parachute to break his fall and save Akane. Cologne recovers the ripped shreds of the moxibustion chart and restores Ranma to his former strength. Some time later, Shampoo gifts Ranma a large bell which appears to be haunted by a humongous ghost cat. The cat is looking for his bride, who wears a small matching bell, currently in Shampoo's possession. The cat attempts to make Shampoo and then female Ranma as his bride but Ranma defeats him with his cat-fist. Back at school, Principal Kuno attempts to teach Akane how to swim but none of his insane methods work. During a training trip, Ranma finds Genma relaxing in a mansion as the pet of a rich reclusive boy, Yotaro. Ranma forces Genma to leave, making Yotaro leave the house for the first time in chase, to his mother's joy. Ryoga encounters a martial arts calligrapher who blesses him with the mark of the battling god in exchange for food. The mark is shaped like an overly cute smiling face but bestows superhuman strength. Ryoga gets rid of the embarrassing mark by contorting his body, rendering it ineffective, and allowing Ranma to defeat him. Finally, Happosai fools two wide-eyed children into thinking he is Santa Claus but their innocence causes him to try to be a good role model.
15	May 18, 1991	4-09-122435-0
147. "When You Wish Upon a Sword" (聖刀満願丸, Seito Manganmaru); 148. "May I Cut In?" (野望のデート, Yabo no deto); 149. "The Final Wish" (みっつめの願い, Mittsu me no negai); 150. "The King is Wild" (博奕王Ｋ, Bakuchi o Kingu K); 151. "Never Bet Your Life" (明日に賭けるギャンブラー, Ashita ni kakeru gyanbura); 152. "Put on a Poker Face" (特訓！ポーカーフェイス, Tokkun! poka feisu); 153. "The Virtues of Training" (逆転ギャンブラー, Gyakuten gyanbura); 154. "Target: Pigtail" (狙われたおさげ, Nerawareta osage); 155. "Let Your Hair Down" (ほどけた封印, Hadoketa fuin); 156. "The Whisker's Secret" (竜の髭の秘密, Ryu no hige no himitsu); 157. "Hair Raising" (動乱の行方, Doran no yukue)
Kuno draws the legendary Wishbringer sword, said to grant three wishes. He squanders the first two so Ranma goes on a date with Kuno to use the third wish as a cure for his curse. Kuno ends up using the last wish on a statue to commemorate their date. Later, the Gambling King returns to collect on debts Ranma and Ukyo incurred ten years ago. He claims the Tendo dojo for himself, creating a children's gambling parlor. Nabiki manages to win back most of the house but the king cheats and gets it all back. Ranma trains his poker face but only succeeds after covering his face with bandages. He finally beats the Gambling King by cheating as well. A group of four diminutive men seek Ranma because his hair is tied back with the legendary dragon's whisker, a potent cure for baldness. Ranma needs it to stop his hair from growing uncontrollably, a consequence of him drinking dragon's whisker soup in the past. Genma and Happosai join in on the chase. After a fierce battle, the soup's effects run out, as does the expiration date on the dragon's whisker, restoring the status quo.
16	July 18, 1991	4-09-122436-9
158. "Let's Go to the Hot" (温泉へ行こう, Onsen e iko); 159. "Screamin' at the Hot Springs!" (絶叫！ 温泉バトル, Zekkyo! onsen batoru); 160. "Three-Leg Scramble" (スクランブル二人三脚, Sukuranburu ni nin sankyaku); 161. "Hot Bath!" (絶叫混浴, Zekkyo kon yoku); 162. "Ranma Gives Up?!" (乱馬リタイヤ!?, Ranma ritaia); 163. "The Final Choice" (最後の選択, Saigo no sentaku); 164. "A Goal Too Far" (遥かなるゴール, Haruka naru goru); 165. "Kung Fu Stew" (格闘ディナーでございます, Kakuto dina de gozaimasu); 166. "Bad Manors" (怪奇！ お上品館, Kaiki! O johin yakata); 167. "La Miserable" (飢えたマドモアゼル, Ueta madomoazeru); 168. "Le Karaté De Foie Gras" (必殺！ グルメ・デ・フォワグラ, Hissatsu! Gurume de fowagura)
Ranma and Shampoo, Mousse and Akane, and Ryoga and Ukyo enter a hot springs three-legged obstacle race, with the prize being a trip to any spring in the world. The cursed cast see it as an opportunity to get to Jusenkyo to cure themselves. The bickering teams swap partners many times while the contest organizers are determined to make them fail so they would not have to pay up. These obstacles include a log run, a waterfall, exploding geysers, sand traps, and a bathhouse-themed maze. Ranma chooses to pair with Akane over Shampoo but Ukyo and Ryoga cross the finish line before them. Unfortunately, Ryoga cannot find Jusenkyo and wastes his prize. At school, Ranma loses a speed-eating battle against Picolet Chardin II, a French martial artist and gourmand, and is forced to pick up the bill. Soun reveals that he promised his unborn daughter to the Chardin family after losing a similar battle twenty years ago. Ranma goes in their place as a female in order to learn the Chardin secrets to speed-eating. He is forced to wear an iron corset by his bridal trainer, Madame St. Paul, and cannot be seen eating according to their rules. To gain an edge, Ranma investigates the "parlay du foie gras", a controversial technique pioneered by a speed-eater without an absurdly large mouth or prehensile tongue.
17	October 18, 1991	4-09-122437-7
169. "Bathroom Training" (バスルームの特訓, Basurumu no tokkun); 170. "Who Masters What?" (必殺技完成？, Hissatsu waza kansei?); 171. "Dinner Wars: The Final Course!" (決戦!!食卓ウォーズ, Kessen!! shokutaku wozu); 172. "Do Not Dessert Me" (ごちそうさまのあとで, Gochiso-sama no ato de); 173. "Hand-Me-Down Ranma" (乱馬なんかいらない！, Ranma nanka iranai!); 174. "The Terrible Truth!" (真実の告白, Shinjitsu no kokuhaku); 175. "Nabiki's Feelings" (おねちゃんの気持ち, Onechan no kimochi); 176. "I'm the Victim Here!" (ごめんね乱馬, Gomen ne Ranma); 177. "I'm Sorry, Akane" (ごめんなあかね, Gomen na Akane); 178. "Maze of Love" (愛と復讐の迷路, Ai to fukushu no meiro); 179. "The Curse of the Scroll!" (放たれた呪い画, Hanatareta noroi ga)
Ranma realizes that the parlay du foie gras involves forcing one's own food into the opponents' mouths. This comes at the expense of one's own nourishment, hence the grim fate of all previous parlay practitioners. So starved is Ranma that the iron corset falls off by itself. Confident in his mastery of the parlay, Ranma challenges Picolet to an eating contest with his freedom on the line. Picolet uses a few counters to the parlay in their match but Ranma overcomes them, using his own ravenous hunger to finish off the last few plates of food. After Ranma and Nabiki simultaneously patronize Akane, Akane gives her engagement with Ranma to Nabiki. Nabiki attempts to sell Ranma to the highest bidder but the auction turns violent when Ukyo, Kodachi, and Shampoo turn on Nabiki. Ranma is forced to protect her and she pretends to love him. She then begins renting Ranma out by the hour while trying to sell him back to Akane. Akane and Ranma both want to make up but their pride and Nabiki's machinations prevent it. Ranma eventually sees through Nabiki's acting and tries to get back at her, but ends up reconciling with Akane instead. Finally, at another festival, Ranma and Genma release a panda painting spirit. Ranma and the panda spirit go on a strange date as its last wish before it returns to its painting.
18	December 11, 1991	4-09-122438-5
180. "Spring Demon" (呪泉郷から来た悪魔, Jusenkyō kara kita akuma); 181. "The Demon's Tale" (悪魔の正体, Akuma no shōtai); 182. "Find Akane!" (あかねはどこに, Akane ha doko ni); 183. "S.W.A.T. (Save Widdle Akane Team)" (あかね救助隊, Akane kyūjotai); 184. "The Watery Grave" (水の砦, Mizu no toride); 185. "The Geyser Traps" (噴き出す罠, Fukidasu wana); 186. "Boiling Retaliation" (反撃の湯, Hangeki no yu); 187. "The Snap of Elastic" (必殺！ パンスト 流星脚, Hissatsu! pansuto-ryūsei-kyaku); 188. "What's in a Name?" (君の名は, Kimi no na ha); 189. "Back to the Freak-ture!" (時をかける じじい(前編), Toki wo kakeru jijii (zenpen)); 190. "And Back and Back and Back" (時をかける じじい(後編), Toki o kakeru jijii (kōhen))
A powerful warrior named Pantyhose Taro is defeating the cursed cast one by one. He is cursed to transform into a chimera-like creature with the body of a yeti, bull horns, crane wings, and an eel tail. He kidnaps Akane to force Happosai, the man who named him, to change his embarrassing name. Ranma, Ryoga, Shampoo, and Mousse mount a rescue party to counter Taro's overwhelming power. They defeat him but Happosai refuses to cooperate. They drug Happosai and put on a play which might delude him into changing Taro's name. The plan backfires and Happosai is convinced that Taro has stolen all the pantyhose in the world. Ranma stops the fight between monsters and Happosai finally agrees to change Taro's name. Taro leaves Japan with Happosai in tow but Happosai changes his mind at the last minute, restoring Pantyhose's original name.
19	March 18, 1992	4-09-122439-3
191. "Melonhead" (渚のスイカ男, Nagisa no suika otoko); 192. "The Horror of Party Beach" (渚の交際鬼, Nagisa no kosai-ki); 193. "Catcher in the Rind" (スイカ畑でつかまえて, Suika batake de tsukamaete); 194. "The Sauce of Ten Years" (十年目のソース, Ju-nen-me no sosu); 195. "For the Love of Sauce" (ソース相愛, Sōsu sōai); 196. "The Truth About the Truth" (本当の本当, Hontō no hontō); 197. "The Honeymoon Period" (いつわりの夫婦, Itsuwari no fufu); 198. "Please Hate Me" (嫌われたくて, Kirawaretakute); 199. "Nightmare on Hot Springs Street" (温泉街の悪夢, Onsen-gai no akumu); 200. "Paper Dolls of Love" (恋の紙人形, Koi no kami ningyō); 201. "The Pill of Obedience" (秘薬 主従丸, Hiyaku shuju-gan)
Kuno appears at the beach with amnesia but having learned a devastating watermelon-slicing attack. Ranma and Akane find out that he had been training at Watermelon Island for so long that attacking watermelons is now a reflex. Ranma defeats him by placing a watermelon on his head, causing him to hit himself. Back at Ukyo's restaurant, she finds her 10-year-old fermented okonomiyaki sauce tastes terrible and moves in with Ranma to recover her confidence. Ranma treats her nicely because he was responsible for ruining the sauce ten years ago. Ukyo begins acting as Ranma's wife, forcing him to look for ways to make her move back, including admitting his mistake, pretending marriage with Akane, and acting abusive toward Ukyo. Finally, he drinks the ruined sauce which motivates Ukyo to become a better cook and a better woman and she moves back to her restaurant. Happosai returns to the dojo after terrorizing a resort town. Gosunkugi buys a set of paper dolls which force people to obey commands written on them. He tries to make Akane like him using the dolls but fails repeatedly. Happosai uses some pills to bring him closer to his student, Ranma. The pills are literal, magnetically sticking them to each other. Ranma defeats Happosai by tricking him into the boy's locker room, eliminating the pill's effects.
20	June 18, 1992	4-09-122440-7
202. "The Lion's Roar" (猛威！獅子咆哮弾, Moi! shishi hokodan); 203. "Prelude to Defeat" (敗北への序曲？, Haiboku e no jokyoku?); 204. "Unlucky Blow" (不幸を呼ぶ技, Fuko o yobu waza); 205. "Emotional Impact" (気分次第の必殺技, Kibun shidai no hissatsu waza); 206. "Lion Versus Tiger!" (決闘!!獅子対猛虎, Ketto!! shishi tai moko); 207. "The Weight of Victory" (勝利の獅子重力, Shori no shishi juryoku); 208. "New Year's Curse" (除夜の呪い, Joya no noroi); 209. "Ring Proposal" (108回目のプロポーズ, 108-kai-me no puropozu); 210. "The Plum and the Prune" (老人と梅, Rojin to ume); 211. "Sibling Warfare" (私闘！九能兄弟, Shito! Kuno kyodai); 212. "The Scandal Breaks!" (スキャンダルの嵐, Sukyandaru no arashi)
Ryoga learns a new technique, the Lion's Roar Blast, and practices it on Ranma. The technique is powered by the user's depression, a feeling Ryoga has in abundance. Ranma and Ryoga agree to a battle in a week's time, Ryoga hoping to perfect the move by then and Ranma seeking a counter to it. Ranma tries to imitate Ryoga's stance but lacks the necessary depression to power the attack. He finds an alternative power source in his confident chi, creating the Pride of the Fierce Tiger. Ryoga, on the other hand, fires his depression straight up in the air, forming a pillar of negative energy and perfecting the Lion's Roar. During their battle, Ranma's confidence quickly evaporates and his new attack proves ineffective. To counter the perfect Lion's Roar Blast, Ranma distracts Ryoga during the impact, rendering him susceptible to his own attack. Ranma claims to have kissed Akane to defeat Ryoga with his own blast. The ghost cat returns on New Year's Eve and kidnaps Shampoo as his bride. As the bell tolls, Shampoo progressively turns into a cat until she kisses Ranma to break the spell. Ranma is enlisted to go on a date with the spirit of a dying man to fulfill his last wish. Finally, Kuno asks Ranma to help him with his sibling rivalry with Kodachi. Ranma puppets an unconscious Kuno to apologize to Kodachi, defusing the situation.
21	July 17, 1992	4-09-123091-1
213. "When Daddy Was Strong" (父よ あなたは強かった, Chichi yo anata wa tsuyokatta); 214. "Time to Leave the Nest" (巣立ちの時, Sudachi no toki); 215. "The Cradle From Hell" (地獄のゆりかご, Jigoku no yurikago); 216. "Mark of the Cherry Blossom" (桜印の男, Sakura-jirushi no hito [otoko]); 217. "Akane's Feelings" (あかねの気モチ, Akane no kimochi); 218. "Storm of Petals" (花の嵐, Hana no arashi); 219. "L! O! V! E!" (HATUKOIチアガール, HATUKOI chiagaru); 220. "Cheerleading for Love" (愛の応援勝負, Ai no oen shobu); 221. "Win One for the Lover" (愛は勝つ!?, Ai wa katsu!?); 222. "Equals in Love" (互角の愛, Gokaku no Ai); 223. "Love vs. Love" (愛の激突!!, Ai no Gekitotsu!!)
Genma laments that his son is stronger than him. He leaves to develop a new technique which might overcome Ranma: the Hell's Cradle, a full-body hold that sickens the opponent. They fight all night to a stalemate. Akane makes some sakuramochi with love-divining powers. Happosai and Kuno are rejected but the mochi predict that Ryoga is destined for Akane. Ranma figures out the sakura-shaped love marks actually came from P-chan's hooves but cannot bring himself to tell Akane after she mistakes the hoofprints on his head for affirmation of their engagement. At school, Furinkan loses a volleyball match because the opposing team's cheerleading squad, led by Mariko Konjo, knocks out the Furinkan team. To avenge Akane's loss, Ranma challenges Mariko to a martial arts cheerleading fight, held during one of Kuno's kendo matches. Mariko initially has the advantage, fueled by her love for Kuno, but Ranma counters with pictures of himself as a girl. Mariko feigns leaving Kuno, which touches his heart and brings him back to her. Ranma switches sides, cheering for the last remaining mystery fencer on the opposing team. The fencer reveals herself to be Akane in disguise just as Ranma proclaims "I love you".
22	September 18, 1992	4-09-123092-X
224. "Love Always Wins" (それでも愛は勝つ!!, Sore de mo ai wa katsu!!); 225. "Ranma Meets His Mother?!" (乱馬ミーツ・マザー!?, Ranma Mitsu Maza!?); 226. "A Man's Vow" (男の誓い, Otoko no chikai); 227. "Risky Reunion" (決死の団らん, Kesshi no danran); 228. "Even If It's Just a Glance" (ひと目だけでも, Hitome dake demo); 229. "Mother and Son...Together!!" (母子水いらず!!, Oyaku [boshi] mizu irazu!!); 230. "Sudden Hate!!" (突然大嫌い!!, Totsuzen dai-kirai!!); 231. "Say You Love Me!!" (好きだと言え!!, Suki da to ie!!); 232. "Love's Counterstrike" (愛の逆流, Ai no gyakuryu); 233. "Who Loves Who?" (告白の行方, Kokuhaku no yukue); 234. "The Phantom Lingerie" (怪異・残されぱんつ, Kaii nokosare pantsu)
Mariko knocks Ranma out while he is distracted by the revelation and Akane takes his place as a cheerleader. Mariko launches her final attack but Ranma deflects it at the last moment, winning the cheering match. At the dojo, Ranma's mother Nodoka makes a sudden appearance. Genma is terrified because he promised to make Ranma a "man among men", under pain of death if he failed. Ranma pretends to be Akane's cousin "Ranko" while Nodoka stays with the Tendos. Before she leaves, Akane arranges a meeting between Nodoka and Ranma, though Genma tries his best to foil it. Ultimately, Ranma saves Nodoka from a burst hot water main, their only brief meeting as mother and son. Shampoo receives the Reversal Jewel from Cologne, which turns her love for Ranma into hate. Ranma, confused by the sudden change, tries to win Shampoo back. Cologne hopes to trick him into saying "I love you" to Shampoo. Mousse uses the Reversal Jewel on Akane to amplify her love for Ranma, ruining the plan. Finally, the spirit of an old dorm mother begins sapping Happosai's energy, threatening to kill him unless he steals her saggy panties. Ranma forces Happosai to steal the unappealing undergarments, for fear that his ghost would continue his panty theft forever in the afterlife.
23	December 12, 1992	4-09-123093-8
235. "Pantyhose Taro Returns!" (パンスト太郎の逆襲, Pansuto Taro no gyakushu); 236. "The Black Secret" (黒い秘密兵器, Kuroi himitsu heiki); 237. "The Hot Water Fortress" (お湯の砦, O-yu no toride); 238. "Tentacular Spectacular" (決戦！タコ足封じ!!, Kessen! tako ashi fuji); 239. "Stomperella" (渚の踏んデレラ, Nagisa no Fu-nderera); 240. "The Fairy Tale Ending" (シンデレラのお返し, Shinderera no ongaeshi); 241. "The Violence of Cooking" (暴力料理教室, Boryoku ryori kyoshitsu); 242. "The Carp of Misery" (悲哀・コイの発生, Hiai koi no hassei); 243. "Carpy Deum" (悲惨・コイの成長, Hisan koi no seicho); 244. "Quit Carping" (悲痛・コイの暴走, Hitsu koi no boso); 245. "One-Punch" (ファイト一発, Faito Ippatsu)
Pantyhose Taro tries to make Happosai change his name using water from the Spring of Drowned Good Samaritan. However, the water is actually from the Spring of Drowned Twins, forcing Ranma and company to try to stop Taro. Ranma counters his new ink-spewing tentacles by luring them into a smokestack, playing off their instinctual draw toward closed spaces. Defeated, Taro finally realizes the truth and gives up on his plan. Later, Ranma is courted by Yohyo Tsuruyasennen, owner of a lavish island resort. However, Yohyo's family is nearly bankrupt due to a large rock plugging the island's hot spring. Ranma leaves after destroying the rock and saving the resort. Back at the dojo, Kasumi has gotten ill and Nodoka offers to cook in her place, with Akane and Ranko's help. Akane ruins the food by bursting a hot water pipe but successfully boils water for instant noodles. Ryoga purchases a "fishing rod of love" at a flea market and hopes to catch Akane's heart with it, but strikes Ranma instead. Ranma develops a one-sided obsessive love for Ryoga who uses the fishing rod again to remove the spell. Finally, Gosunkugi obtains a powered exoskeleton, One-Punch, which he uses to fight Ranma. He is unable to land a single punch on Ranma in the allotted time, causing it to self-destruct.
24	March 18, 1993	4-09-123094-6
246. "The Guest at the Cat Café" (猫飯店の客, Neko Hanten no kyaku); 247. "The Animal Kingdom" (野生の王国, Yasei no okoku); 248. "The Lost Treasure" (失われた秘密, Ushinawareta hiho); 249. "Battle of the Hot Springs Women!" (露天風呂 女の戦い!!, Rotenburo onna no tatakai!!); 250. "Race to Treasure Mountain" (追跡 宝来山, Tsuiseki Horai-san); 251. "Death on Treasure Mountain" (宝来山に死す, Horai-san ni shisu); 252. "The Tragedy of the Pail" (止水桶の悲劇, Chii-sui-ton no higeki); 253. "The Waterfall of Secret Treasure Revealed!" (出現!!秘宝の滝, Shutsugen!! hiho no taki); 254. "An Ever-Elusive Treasure" (遠い開水壺, Toi kai-sui-fu); 255. "The Confession of Rage!" (ハーブ 怒りの激白, Habu ikari no gekihaku); 256. "Rise Up, Ranma!" (立ちあがれ乱馬！, Tachiagare Ranma!)
The last remaining members of the Musk Dynasty visit Cologne in Japan. These warriors mate with wild animals turned into human women by the cursed springs of Jusenkyo, improving their children's fighting ability. Ranma fights their dragon-born leader Herb, but is handily defeated and sealed in his female form by the Pot of Preservation. Ranma needs the Kettle of Liberation to counteract this effect and clashes with Herb who is also searching for it. Ryoga and Mousse join Ranma, hoping to use the Pot of Preservation as a cure for their curses, and pursue Herb to Mt. Horai. Ryoga and Mousse face off against the tiger-born Lime and wolf-born Mint, using their experience sparring against Ranma to defeat their more powerful opponents. Unfortunately, the pot seals them in their cursed forms, leaving Ranma to face Herb by himself. Ranma chases the Musk trio to the Kettle of Liberation where he discovers that Herb is a cursed female like himself and needed the kettle to unseal himself. Ranma uses Herb's anger to power the Heaven-Blast of the Dragon but Herb anticipates it and cools his energy, rendering it ineffective. Meanwhile, Ryoga and Mousse return to their human forms by defeating Lime and Mint again and recovering the kettle.
25	June 18, 1993	4-09-123095-4
257. "A Man Again!" (乱馬、男に戻る!!, Ranma, otoko ni modoru!!); 258. "Welcome Home, Ranma!" (おかえり乱馬, O-kaeri Ranma); 259. "The Ultimate Teacher!" (必殺新任教師!!, Hissatsu shinnin kyoshi!!); 260. "The Eight Mysterious Treasures" (謎の八宝五円殺, Nazo no happo-goen-satsu); 261. "The World's Most Powerful Woman" (史上最強の女, Shijo saikyo no onna); 262. "Go for the Pressure Points!" (急いでツボを押せ！, Isoide tsubo o ose!); 263. "The Formation from Hell" (地獄のフォーメーション, Jigoku no fomeshon); 264. "The Eight Treasures Change Return" (八宝つり銭返し, Happo-tsurisen-gaeshi); 265. "The Ultimate Health Regimen" (究極の健康法！, Kyukyoku no kenko-ho); 266. "Akane's Journey" (あかねの旅立ち, Akane no tabidachi); 267. "Recovered Memories" (よみがえる記憶, Yomigaeru kioku)
Ryoga jumps into a fissure to recover the Kettle of Liberation for Ranma while Ranma feigns another Heaven-Blast of the Dragon. Ryoga breaks open an underground water spout filled with the kettle's unsealing magic as Herb executes his own Heaven-Blast, playing right into Ranma's hands. Using the upward momentum of the tornado, Ranma concentrates this energy into the Dragon's Descending Crashing Wave, a massive ball of energy which crushes Herb. Ranma's curse is unsealed and he rescues Herb's unconscious body as the mountain collapses. At school, a new teacher named Hinako Ninomiya arrives to bring discipline to the student body. At first, she appears as a child but grows to adult proportions after using the Happo Five-Yen Satsu, a chi-draining technique. She can release the drained chi in an energy blast, the Happo No-Yen Coin Return. She learned these devastating attacks from Happosai when she was a sickly child and Ranma futilely attempts to apply the pressure points needed to counter them. Later, Akane travels to Ryugenzawa to take care of a monster sighting. She encounters Shinnosuke, a guardian of the forest with his grandfather, whom she met before as a child but he does not remember her.
26	September 18, 1993	4-09-123096-2
268. "The Secret of the Forest" (不思議の森の秘密, Fushigi no mori no himitsu); 269. "The Water of Life" (生命の水, Inochi (seimei) no mizu); 270. "In the Shade of the Forest" (森の木陰で, Mori no kokage de); 271. "See Ya, Akane" (あばよ、あかね, Abayo, Akane); 272. "The King of Beasts Emerges!" (珍獣王出現!!, Chinju o shutsugen!!); 273. "The Fury of the Orochi!" (オロチ怒る!!, Orochi Ikaru!!); 274. "The Eighth Head" (八つめの頭, Yattsu-me no atama); 275. "Take Care of Her" (あかねを頼む, Akane o tanomu); 276. "Blow Your Horn!" (角笛を吹け!!, Tsunobue o fuke!!); 277. "Let's Go Home" (一緒に帰ろう, Issho ni kaero); 278. "These Words I Send to You" (贈る言葉, Okuru kotoba)
Ranma follows Akane to Ryugenzawa, but she refuses to go home. Akane discovers the reason for Shinnosuke's forgetfulness—he suffered a grave injury while defending Akane from monsters on her previous visit. He survived by drinking the Water of Life, the same liquid that caused all the animals to grow into huge monsters, but the water is running out. Ranma, Ryoga, Akane, Shinnosuke, and his grandfather are attacked by the Yamata no Orochi, a multi-headed serpent that loves women and beer. Moss growing on the serpent's body is the source of the Water of Life and would cure Shinnosuke if recovered. The men disguise themselves as women to lure the serpent while Akane, dressed as a boy, looks for the moss. Ranma throws beer at the serpent's eyes and they defeat seven of the heads. The eighth and largest head appears and attacks Akane, who manages to scrape off some of its moss before getting captured and dragged underwater. Ranma and Shinnosuke rescue her and Ranma acts as bait while they use the moss to cure Shinnosuke. Akane uses a horn whistle Shinnosuke gave her long ago to put the serpent to sleep and rescue Ranma, who had been eaten. The serpent returns to its cave to sleep and Akane returns home with Ranma.
27	December 11, 1993	4-09-123097-0
279. "Danger: Home Visit Ahead!" (必殺！家庭訪問, Hissatsu! katei homon); 280. "Target: Soun!" (狙われた早雲, Nerawareta Soun); 281. "Danger: Flight Path of Love!" (必殺！愛の逃避行, Hissatsu! ai no tohi ko); 282. "The Unbeatable Lens" (無敵の無敵鏡, Muteki no muteki-kyo); 283. "Tearful Apology!!" (泣いてあやまれ!!, Naite ayamare!!); 284. "The Lowliest Jerk" (最低の男, Saitei no otoko); 285. "Demon Dog of the Sea" (海の魔犬, Umi no maken); 286. "Compliment Me!" (私をほめて！, Watashi o homete!); 287. "Curséd Cave of Broken Loves" (呪いの破恋洞, Noroi no Haren-do); 288. "Exit of Misery" (別れの出口, Wakare no deguchi); 289. "Give Back the Tests!!" (テストを返せ!!, Tesuto o kaese!!)
Hinako goes house-hunting and visits the Tendo dojo in the process. She falls in love with Soun and tries to propose to him, but Akane and Nabiki oppose. Soun never realizes that the child and adult Hinako are the same person. Mousse finds a pair of special glasses that cause its victims to cower in fear. He uses them to humiliate Ranma but Shampoo loses respect for him. Ranma resorts to using similar cowardly devices as revenge. Mousse puts the glasses on backwards to apologize to Ranma and earns a date with Shampoo. A dog monster terrorizes a local beach and affixes itself to Ranma's swimsuit. It threatens to drag Ranma underwater unless "Natsuhiko" compliments it. Kuno happens to look like a young Natsuhiko so Ranma coerces Kuno into fulfilling the swimsuit's request. Ukyo and Ryoga trick Ranma and Akane to enter the Tunnel of Lost Love together. The tunnel mistakes the former two for a couple and breaks them up instead of Ranma and Akane. Finally, the principal steals everyone's test papers and threatens to read Ranma's score out loud. The balloon with the scores floats away and the local news pick up the story.
28	March 18, 1994	4-09-123098-9
290. "Mother, I Am Ranma" (母さん、おれが乱馬です, Kasan, ore ga Ranma desu); 291. "Thousand-Mountain vs. Thousand-Sea" (海千拳と山千拳, Umi-senken to yama-senken); 292. "Ranma vs. Ranma" (乱馬対乱馬, Ranma tai Ranma); 293. "Intensive Training!!" (特訓!! 海千拳, Tokkun!! umisen-ken); 294. "A Letter From Mother" (母からの手紙, Haha kara no tegami); 295. "Quick as Lightning—The Thousand Seas!" (電光石火 海千拳！, Denko sekka umisen-ken); 296. "House of the Sea, House of the Mountain" (海の家、山の家, Umi no ie, yama no ie); 297. "Thousand-Mountain Tragedy" (山千拳の悲劇, Yamasen-ken no higeki); 298. "The Invisible Strike" (見えない秘拳, Mienai hi-ken); 299. "The Truth of the Secret Scrolls" (秘伝書の真実, Hiden-sho no shinjitsu); 300. "Ranma's Tears" (乱馬の涙, Ranma no namida)
Nodoka encounters a manly man who practices the Yama-senken, part of the Saotome School of Anything Goes Martial Arts. He poses as Ranma and Nodoka is overjoyed to be reunited with her "son". The fake Ranma is trying to find the scroll for the Umi-senken, the counterpoint fighting style, by stealing it from Nodoka. The two styles were developed by Genma, the former to break into houses and the latter to stealthily escape. Genma teaches the Umi-senken to Ranma in order to defeat Ryu Kumon, the Ranma imposter. Ryu is fighting to avenge his father's dojo, which Genma destroyed with the Yama-senken. Ryu is no match for Ranma's stealthy attacks and counters, and is forced to seal away the Yama-senken and reveal himself to Nodoka. Finally, Happosai tries to get Ranma's tears for a rejuvenation potion which regresses him to a baby-like mental state.
29	June 18, 1994	4-09-123099-7
301. "The Terror of the Phoenix Sword!" (恐怖の鳳凰剣, Kyofu no hoo-ken); 302. "The Immortal Phoenix Sword" (不滅の鳳凰剣, Fumetsu no hoo-ken); 303. "The Seeds of Tragedy" (悲劇の種子, Higeki no tane (shushi)); 304. "Motherhood Flower, Please" (母性花どうぞ, Bosei kado zo); 305. "Shampoo—Captive!" (捕われのシャンプー, Toraware no Shampoo); 306. "The Forest of Poisonous Plants" (毒草の森, Dokuso no mori); 307. "The Ultimate Medicine" (最後の秘薬, Saigo no hiyaku); 308. "Evil and the Bean" (邪悪と豆の字, Jaaku to mame no ji); 309. "The King of Poverty's Challenge" (火車王の挑戦, Kashao no chosen); 310. "The King of Debt vs. the Queen of Debt" (借金王VS借金女王, Shakkin o VS. shakkin joo); 311. "For the Love of Ten Yen" (地獄の10円勝負！, Jigoku no 10-en shobu!)
Kuno obtains a phoenix egg which hatches when placed on his head. The phoenix chick continuously attacks the first thing it sees, which is the basis of the Phoenix Sword technique. Ranma feeds the chick special seeds until it matures and flies away. Pink and Link, twin Amazon warriors from a rival village, arrive in Japan to take revenge on Shampoo and her "husband", Ranma. They use multiple toxins to capture Ranma and Shampoo. Akane enters their poisonous jungle to rescue them but when dawn breaks, the plants release their venomous pollen and puts them all in danger. Ranma escapes with all four girls in tow but injures his legs in the process. Later, an oni demon escapes from a temple and begins possessing people to pull pranks. Ranma recaptures it after it possesses Kasumi. A man named Kinnosuke challenges Nabiki to a duel of debt. They compete to have the other pay the bill for their date—whoever spends 10 yen will have to pay for all of it. They rack up an enormous bill, spending over one billion yen gambling, eating at fancy restaurants, and renting hotel suites. After Kinnosuke gets injured, Nabiki misses an opportunity to win when she calls 911 instead of his personal physician at a pay phone using his money. She keeps the 10 yen coin as commemoration of the date, winning the match.
30	August 10, 1994	4-09-123100-4
312. "Spring Comes To Ryoga" (良牙の春, Ryoga no haru); 313. "LOVE the Pig!" (ブタが好き！, Buta ga suki!); 314. "The Perfect Couple" (理想のカップル, Riso no kappuru); 315. "Experimental Herb・Towering Hair" (試薬・努髪天, Shiyaku・Dohatsuten); 316. "Infinite Battle "Ki"" (無限の闘気, Mugen no toki); 317. "Let's Study!" (勉強しよう！, Benkyo o shiyo!); 318. "The Tragic Legend of the Black Cherry Tree" (男桜悲伝, Otoko-zakura hiden); 319. "Ranma Catches a Cold" (乱馬風邪をひく, Ranma kaze o hiku); 320. "A Hot Reunion?!" (熱い再会!?, Atsui saikai!?); 321. "Ranma Till Morning" (朝まで乱馬, Asa made Ranma); 322. "The Cursed Spatula" (呪いのヘラ, Noroi no hera)
Ryoga defeats a giant pig, prompting its owner to give him a love confession letter. The owner is Akari Unryu, heir to a family who raises sumo pigs. Ranma attempts to set them up and eventually shows Ryoga's curse to Akari, who is overjoyed. She resolves to wait for Ryoga to fall in love with her. Genma tries a new baldness cure which only works when the subject is angry. The hair attacks anyone nearby so Ranma makes Genma laugh, causing the hair to fall out. Hinako finds some Siamese fighting fish with inexhaustible chi which she uses to maintain her adult form. Ranma initially tries to beat her but recognizes her concern for his educational welfare and cooperates. However, she begins acting childlike despite her adult form due to exhaustion. Kuno gets possessed by a tree-demon and needs Ranma to kiss him to escape. Ranma threatens the tree with an axe and it gives up. Ranma gets a fever so strong that it heats any water that touches him, preventing a change. He tries to use this to meet his mother as a man but Genma and Happosai get in the way. Nodoka ends up getting Ranma's fever and he keeps her company until she gets well again. Finally, Ranma touches a cursed spatula and must "use it correctly" in order to get rid of it. However, it is actually a clothes iron and he irons a handkerchief to release the curse.
31	November 18, 1994	4-09-123461-5
323. "Happosai's New Disciple" (八宝斎の新弟子, Happosai no shindeshi); 324. "Secret Treasure・Brocade Butterfly" (秘宝・錦の蝶, Hiho * nishiki no cho); 325. "Special Move・Wild Butterfly Dance!" (奥義・胡蝶乱舞, Ogi * kocho ranbu); 326. "Lucky Day...My Family's Away!" (大安吉日・家族は留守！, Taian kichijitsu * kazoku wa rusu!); 327. "Alone With Them Both" (あかねも あかりも, Akane mo Akari mo); 328. "The Umbrella of Love" (伝説の相合ガサ, Densetsu no aiaigasa); 329. "Get Ready for Swim Class!" (激突!! 水泳教室, Gekitotsu!! suiei kyoshitsu); 330. "Cold Summer Noodles" (サマー・ジャンボ・冷し中華, Sama * janbo * hiyashi chuka); 331. "The Doll of Vengenance" (怪談・仕返し人形, Kaidan * shikaeshi ningyo); 332. "The Doll's Trap" (人形の罠, Ningyo no wana); 333. "Aloha School" (アロハ漂流教室, Aroha hyoryu kyoshitsu)
Rakkyosai, an old friend of Happosai's, arrives in Nerima pretending to be his great-grandson through the Spring of Drowned Boy. He and Happosai team up to get a print of Ranma's breasts using the Brocade Butterfly, a special multi-colored inkstone, but fail. Ryoga finds his way home and both Akari and Akane visit him. Ranma punishes him for two-timing them by posing as his maid and setting up awkward situations. On a rainy day, the cast fight over and break the "Umbrella of Love", an artifact which engenders affection between two people who stand under it. In gym class, Hinako challenges Akane to a swimming race, but neither of them can swim. Their continued attempts destroy the swimming pool. Cologne holds a noodle-eating contest to get rid of a disgusting cold noodle stock. The prize is a special strength-giving noodle hidden in one of the bowls and Ranma, Ryoga, and Kuno nearly die looking for it. At a hot spring inn, a doll spirit trades bodies with Akane to take revenge on Ranma for knocking it over. Akane gets her body back after falling in the hot spring with the doll. Principal Kuno shipwrecks the student body on a deserted island and they get infected with Aloha Virus, which turns people into mindless tourists. Ranma makes the principal sweat the cure out at a hot spring after he selfishly drinks it.
32	February 18, 1995	4-09-123462-3
334. "The Glowing Girl" (光る少女, Hikaru shojo); 335. "The Other Rouge!!" (ルージュ変身!!, Ruju henshin!!); 336. "Source of Power: Owner's Manual" ("力の源"使用法, "Chikara no minamoto" shiyoho); 337. "A Beautiful Friendship" (炎のツープラトン, Honoo no tsupuraton); 338. "Beware! The Blows of Strength" (秘拳！徒手孝行乱打, Hiken! toshu koko randa); 339. "The White Lily" (白ユリの飛鳥, Shira-yuri no Asuka); 340. "Battle of the Boyfriends!" (彼氏で白黒つけましょう！, Kareshi de shirokuro tsukemasho!); 341. "The Chosen One" (選ばれた武道家, Erabareta budo-ka); 342. "Ranma's Plot" (乱馬の陰謀, Ranma no inbo); 343. "The First Time I Said What I Felt" (初めて本音を言ったのに…, Hajimete honne o itta noni...); 344. "The Great Divide" (二人の距離, Futari no kyori)
A Chinese girl named Rouge severely injures Pantyhose Taro with the power of her cursed form: the many-armed and many-faced Asura. She retrieves the source of her power which Taro inadvertently stole. Ranma teams up with Taro in order to end the battle before the dojo is completely destroyed. When Taro does not cease the attack, Ranma helps Rouge knock him out and she leaves peacefully, power source in tow. Kodachi the Black Rose duels her rival, Asuka Saginomiya the White Lily, over whose boyfriend is better. Akane allows Kodachi to bring Ranma because of her pride in his attractiveness. When it is Asuka's turn to reveal her boyfriend, he turns out to be a handsome stranger she kidnapped and the rivals vow to duel again in five years. Soun obtains a legendary martial artist's uniform from a temple, said to make the wearer stronger. It chooses Akane as its master and Ranma is unable to defeat her. To overcome the uniform, he must steal the heart of the wearer. While seducing Akane, Ranma realizes how cute she is and tries to express his genuine feelings. However, Akane does not believe him, thinking he is merely jealous of the uniform. To convey his sincerity, Ranma shields Akane from a long fall which breaks the uniform in the process.
33	May 18, 1995	4-09-123463-1
345. "Love Medicine" (愛の特効薬, Ai no tokkoyaku); 346. "Kasumi Gets Mad" (かすみさんが怒った, Kasumi-san ga okotta); 347. "The Mushroom of Time" (年の数だけ, Toshi no kazu dake); 348. "To the Mushroom Forest!" (キノコの森に行こう！, Kinoko no mori ni ikô!); 349. "16cm Short" (遠い16cm, Toi 16 cm); 350. "The Two Shampoos" (二人のシャンプー, Futari no Shampoo); 351. "Payback's a Saint" (今宵も恩返し, Koyoi mo ongaeshi); 352. "Drawn and Quartered Horse" (迷惑!!暴れ絵馬, Meiwaku!! abare ema); 353. "Saotome Family (Onsen) Vacation" (早乙女一家温泉旅行, Saotome-ikka onsen ryoko); 354. "Stop that Octopus!" (タコが狙ってる, Tako ga neratteru); 355. "Masked Death Match!" (激闘！お面デスマッチ, Gekito! o-men desumatchi)
A hospitalized boy named Densuke refuses to take his medicine until he goes out with a cute girl so Ranma takes it as his duty. Kasumi appears upset after Soun takes everyone else out to dinner, letting hers go to waste. However, she was merely trying to get rid of a cat before Ranma returned home. Ryoga and Ranma eat a special mushroom that regresses them to age five. Their constant fighting nearly destroys all the restorative mushrooms so Akane grows them in secret, away from their rivalry. Mousse gives a scarf he knitted to a jizo statue after Shampoo rejects it. The statue takes the form of Shampoo to thank him. Ranma, Akane, and Cologne stage an intervention when his night life with the statue prevents him from getting any sleep. Someone destroys all the good luck offerings from students taking entrance exams. The culprit turns out to be the shrine's ugly horse who is offended by his too-realistic portrayal on the offerings. At a hot spring resort, Ranma and Genma encounter Nodoka, who recognizes them by the coats she made for them long ago. Hayato Myojin, a rival chef specializing in takoyaki, arrives to challenge Ukyo. He wears a mask constantly because of a previous loss to her and he wins the right to remove it by beating her.
34	July 18, 1995	4-09-123464-X
356. "Shotgun Beans!!" (節分!!鉄砲豆, Setsubun!! teppo mane); 357. "The Little Heart" (小さなハート, Chiisa na hato); 358. "Whack the Principal!" (校長を殴ろう！, Kocho o naguro!); 359. "Bow Down!" (土下座させまーす！, Dogeza sasema–su!); 360. "Busted!" (バストバトル！, Basuto batoru!); 361. "The Punishment of Perv-Boy!" (成敗！変態少年, Seibai! hentai shonen); 362. "Mama, Papa and Tata" (ちちと母, Chichi to haha); 363. "Looking His Best" (晴れ姿 ご対面, Hare sugata go-taimen); 364. "See Me for What I Am" (本当の俺を見てください, Honto no ore o mite kudasai); 365. "Incense of Spring Sleep" (悪夢！春眠香, Akumu! shunmin ko); 366. "The Three-Year Smile of Death" (微笑み三年殺し, Hohoemi sannen-goroshi)
Soun receives a "Shotgun Bean" plant, which shoots beans at anyone who shows anger. The Tendos and Saotomes fail to defeat it until Kasumi steps in and tosses the annoying plant. A sick little girl asks Akane to deliver Valentine's Day chocolate to her precocious crush, Ranma. Akane succeeds with difficulty and also gives her own chocolate to him. Hinako drains Principal Kuno's statue of its negative chi, accumulated from years of students bowing before it. The chi makes her act like a delinquent until she expends it all by defeating the principal. Akane and Ranko go bra-shopping with Nodoka and circumstances make her think a pervert is on the loose. After discovering the supposed pervert is Ranma, she is happy to see him doing naughty things with his fiancée. However, Ranma must convince his mother of his manliness after he is seen in women's clothes because of Happosai's interference. Nodoka is satisfied when she sees him trying to peek on Akane in the bath. Later, Akane smells some of Happosai's sleep-til-spring incense meant for Ranma and begins acting out her dreams. They wake her with some mosquito-repelling incense which reminds her of summer. Mousse believes Shampoo is using the Three Year Smile of Death, the ultimate passive-aggressive technique, on him but it turns out to be a misunderstanding.
35	October 18, 1995	4-09-123465-8
367. "The Two Ranmas" (二人の乱馬, Futari no Ranma); 368. "An Isosceles Love Triangle" (二等辺三角関係, Nitohen sankaku kankei); 369. "Get That Compact!!" (コンパクトを奪え!!, Konpakuto o ubae); 370. "The Ultimate Couple" (究極のカップル, Kyūkyoku no kappuru); 371. "Playing House" (二人でお留守番, Futari de o-rusuban); 372. "The Sisters of Terror!" (戦慄クノ一シスターズ, Senritsu! kunoichi shisutāzu); 373. "The Saddest Kunoichi" (不幸のくノ一, Fuko no kunoichi); 374. "Runaway Ninja!" (抜け忍 小夏, Nukenin Konatsu); 375. "Ranma vs. Konatsu" (乱馬vs小夏, Ranma VS Konatsu); 376. "Konatsu's Happiness" (小夏のしあわせ, Konatsu no shiawase); 377. "Bamboo Leaves of Love" (縁結びの笹, Enmusubi no sasa)
After female Ranma looks into a cursed mirror, a spirit copies his form and causes mischief. When the spirit discovers Ranma's curse, she falls in love with the male Ranma and gets jealous of Akane. The old man who owns the mirror gives Ranma a compact mirror to seal the spirit with. The spirit tries to evade capture until male Ranma looks into the cursed mirror again and produces another copy which falls in love with the first copy, distracting them long enough to repair the mirror's seal. Ranma accidentally destroys a Nabiki's rare concert ticket and he spends the day with her as apology, during which she continuously teases and blackmails him. Happosai takes Ranma and Genma to a cafe featuring kunoichi—female ninja—but he destroys it when the ninja turn out to be ugly. The ninja stepmother and stepsisters send the pretty Konatsu to take revenge. Ukyo takes pity on the ninja and offers her a job as a waitress. Ranma, Ukyo, and Akane help her defeat her abusive stepfamily to gain her freedom and they discover that she is actually a male ninja. At a Tanabata festival, Ranma's and Akane's marriage fortunes get attached to various others' fortunes, cursing them to be those people's love slaves. They go to great lengths to recover their fortunes and restore their luck.
36	January 18, 1996	4-09-123466-6
378. "The Conspiracy of Jellyfish Beach" (海月浜の陰謀, Kurage hama no inbo); 379. "Coming Soon" (カミング・スーン, Kamingu sūn); 380. "A Visit to the Family Grave" (早乙女家墓参り, Saotome ke hakamairi); 381. "The Saotome Family Reunion" (早乙女夫婦再会, Saotome fufu saikai); 382. "A Mother's Doubts" (母の疑惑, Haha no giwaku); 383. "Ranma's Seppuku" (乱馬切腹, Ranma seppuku); 384. "Reunion and Farewell" (再会と別れ, Saikai to wakare); 385. "Goodbye Ranma?!" (乱馬、天道家を去る, Ranma, Tendo-ke o saru); 386. "A Package from Mother" (母の贈り, Haha no okuri mono); 387. "Bet on the Ring!!" (リングにかける!!, Ringu ni kakeru!!); 388. "The Sales Force" (力ずく繁盛記, Chikarazuku hanjo ki)
Akane is the 10,000th person to drown at Jellyfish Beach and she wins a special swimsuit which enables her to swim. She wins a long-distance swimming race and greets the Jellyfish King. Ryoga tries to find his way to a date with Akari but his hopeless sense of direction makes it much more difficult than it needs to be. Genma brings Ranma to the family grave, trying to pilfer the family treasure but Nodoka retrieves it first. Genma steals the treasure, a medal for a neighborhood martial arts competition, while they stay at the same inn. Ranma resolves to meet his mother as a man and return the treasure. Nodoka suspects Ranma's secret but he perseveres and saves her from falling into the ocean, proving his manhood. Genma interferes and they all fall into the water, revealing his curse. Nodoka admits that Ranma is indeed a man among men, even as a woman. She takes Ranma home to live with her and he and Akane part on bad terms. Nodoka asks Ranma to deliver a ring-like object to Akane. He has trouble because he believes it to be an engagement ring but it turns out to just be a pill box. Ukyo gets a cold and Ranma and Akane offer to help Konatsu run the restaurant until she gets better. Their antics drive off customers and lose money for the restaurant so Ukyo hurries to get better.
37	April 18, 1996	4-09-123467-4
389. "Messenger From Jusenkyo" (呪泉郷からの 使者, Jusenkyō kara no shisha); 390. "Battle for the Map!" (呪泉郷地図 攻防戦, Jusenkyō chizu kōbōsen); 391. "Egg Shampoo" (シャンプーの卵, Shanpū no tamago); 392. "China Bound!!" (乱馬 中国へ!!, Ranma Chūgoku he!!); 393. "The Prince of Ho'o Peak" (鳳凰山の王子様, Hōō-san no ōji-sama); 394. "The Labyrinth Beneath" (鳳凰山地下迷路, Hōō-san chika meiro); 395. "Dogfight above the Peak" (鳳凰山空中戦, Hōō-san kuchusen); 396. "Akane in the Spring" (あかね 呪泉郷へ, Akane Jusenkyō he); 397. "Bad News at Jusenkyo" (呪泉郷の変, Jusenkyō no ihen); 398. "Akane Breaks Out!" (あかね逃亡, Akane tōbō)
Plum, the daughter of the Jusenkyo guide, comes to Japan bearing ill news. The bird-people of Mt. Phoenix are after Jusenkyo's secret and if they succeed, all of the cursed springs will dry up. Captain Kiema and her lieutenants, Koruma and Masala, confront the cursed cast for the secret. Shampoo is brainwashed using an imprinting spell and retrieves the map to Jusenkyo's secret for Kiema. The bird-people escape to China with Shampoo and the map in tow and the cursed cast follow. A child named Saffron helps them get to the mountain more quickly with his Kinjakan, a sun-based staff weapon. However, he turns out to be the prince of the bird-people and drops them into a pit trap, but not before they steal the Kinjakan. They use it to tunnel their way to the Mt. Phoenix palace where Ranma and Kiema have an aerial duel. Ranma outmaneuvers her and they manage to reclaim the stolen map before being ejected from the palace. Kiema captures Akane and brings her to Jusenkyo to create the new Spring of Drowned Akane. She survives but Kiema uses the spring to disguise herself as Akane and steals the Kinjakan and the map. Plum leads the team to Jusendo waterfall, Jusenkyo's water source. Shampoo confronts them there and brainwashes Genma as well while Akane escapes from her cell.
38	May 18, 1996	4-09-123468-2
399. "The Phoenix and the Dragon" (鳳凰と竜, Hōō to Ryuu); 400. "The Saffron Egg" (サフラン変態, Safuran Hentai); 401. "The Spout of the Dragon" (竜の蛇口, Ryū no Jaguchi); 402. "A Last, Sweet Memory" (最後の思い出, Saigo no Omoide); 403. "Saffron Reborn" (サフラン誕生, Safuran Tanjō); 404. "Ranma Battles Saffron!!" (激突!! 乱馬vsサフラン, Gekitotsu!! Ranma vs Safuran); 405. "The Power of the Gekkaja" (月渦蛇の力, Gekkaja no Chikara); 406. "Akane's Smile" (あかねの微笑み, Akane no Hohoemi); 407. "Next: The Final Chapter" (最終話 らんまとあかね, Saishōwa Ranma to Akane; "The Final Chapter: Ranma and Akane")
Akane encounters the Jusenkyo guide and they observe Saffron using the Kinjakan to boil the Jusendo waters, triggering his transformation into an adult. Akane touches the Kinjakan in an effort to save Ranma from Saffron's trap but the heat from the weapon evaporates all the water in her body, reducing her to doll size. Ranma must use Kinjakan's moon-based pair, Gekkaja, to turn on the cold Jusendo waters which would restore Akane to normal. The initial strike destroys the hot water source and cracks open Saffron's egg prematurely but Ranma gets knocked out and captured by Shampoo. Their fight ends when Shampoo's brainwashing is broken and Saffron emerges from his egg. Ranma uses the Gekkaja's freezing powers to draw Saffron into a powerful Heaven-Blast of the Dragon, a ploy to get close enough to freeze him solid. Saffron counters with the Kinjakan and a massive fireball, which Ranma survives by freezing himself. Akane uses her doll body to punch through Saffron's next fireball, allowing Ranma to shoot a Heaven-Blast directly at his heart. As Akane's life force drains away, Ranma destroys the cold water nozzle and restores her body. Believing her to be dead, he confesses his love to her as she wakes up. They return to Japan where Soun and Nodoka have made wedding preparations. The Jusenkyo guides sends a single dose of Spring of Drowned Man as a wedding gift, attracting the cursed cast, while Nabiki's invitations draw in the rest of Nerima's lunatics. Happosai drinks the spring water and Soun postpones the wedding until all other engagements can be sorted out. The manga closes with Ranma and Akane running to school together.

== 1993 English release ==
No.	Release date	ISBN
1	May 1993 (1st edition); May 7, 2003 (2nd edition)	0-929279-93-X; 978-1-56931-962-8
Chapters 1–14
2	June 1994 (1st edition); May 7, 2003 (2nd edition)	1-56931-016-5; 978-1-56931-963-5
Chapters 15–25
3	August 1994 (1st edition); August 27, 2003 (2nd edition)	1-56931-020-3; 978-1-59116-062-5
Chapters 26–36
4	July 1995 (1st edition); August 27, 2003 (2nd edition)	1-56931-085-8; 978-1-59116-063-2
Chapters 37–49
5	September 1995 (1st edition); October 10, 2003 (2nd edition)	1-56931-084-X; 978-1-59116-064-9
Chapters 50–62
6	July 1996 (1st edition); November 12, 2003 (2nd edition)	1-56931-137-4; 978-1-59116-065-6
Chapters 63–73
7	September 1996 (1st edition); February 4, 2004 (2nd edition)	1-56931-128-5; 978-1-59116-129-5
Chapters 74–84
8	April 1997 (1st edition); February 4, 2004 (2nd edition)	1-56931-202-8; 978-1-59116-130-1
Chapters 85–96
9	June 1997 (1st edition); April 28, 2004 (2nd edition)	1-56931-203-6; 978-1-59116-283-4
Chapters 97–108
10	December 1997 (1st edition); April 29, 2004 (2nd edition)	1-56931-253-2; 978-1-59116-284-1
Chapters 109–119
11	June 1998 (1st edition); July 7, 2004 (2nd edition)	1-56931-291-5; 978-1-59116-285-8
Chapters 120–130
12	January 1999 (1st edition); July 14, 2004 (2nd edition)	1-56931-342-3; 978-1-59116-286-5
Chapters 131–141
13	March 1999 (1st edition); October 3, 2004 (2nd edition)	1-56931-362-8; 978-1-59116-287-2
Chapters 142–153
14	January 5, 2000 (1st edition); November 30, 2004 (2nd edition)	1-56931-430-6; 978-1-59116-288-9
Chapters 154–164
15	December 6, 2000 (1st edition); January 3, 2005 (2nd edition)	1-56931-492-6; 978-1-59116-289-6
Chapters 165–178
16	May 6, 2001 (1st edition); January 3, 2005 (2nd edition)	1-56931-542-6; 978-1-59116-290-2
Chapters 179–190
17	August 5, 2001 (1st edition); April 15, 2005 (2nd edition)	1-56931-565-5; 978-1-59116-291-9
Chapters 191–201
18	December 10, 2001 (1st edition); April 15, 2005 (2nd edition)	1-56931-649-X; 978-1-59116-292-6
Chapters 202–212
19	February 9, 2002 (1st edition); August 9, 2005 (2nd edition)	1-56931-711-9; 978-1-59116-293-3
Chapters 213–223
20	August 5, 2002 (1st edition); August 9, 2005 (2nd edition)	1-56931-740-2; 978-1-59116-294-0
Chapters 224–234
21	March 8, 2003 (1st edition); November 8, 2005 (2nd edition)	1-56931-866-2; 978-1-59116-295-7
Chapters 235–245
22	May 2003	978-1-56931-890-4
Chapters 246–256
23	August 27, 2003	978-1-59116-060-1
Chapters 257–267
24	October 29, 2003	978-1-59116-061-8
Chapters 268–278
25	February 11, 2004	978-1-59116-128-8
Chapters 279–289
26	April 28, 2004	978-1-59116-296-4
Chapters 290–300
27	August 10, 2004	978-1-59116-459-3
Chapters 301–311
28	November 17, 2004	978-1-59116-584-2
Chapters 312–322
29	February 15, 2005	978-1-59116-681-8
Chapters 323–333
30	May 3, 2005	978-1-59116-776-1
Chapters 334–344
31	August 16, 2005	978-1-59116-860-7
Chapters 345–355
32	November 8, 2005	978-1-4215-0072-0
Chapters 356–366
33	February 7, 2006	978-1-4215-0256-4
Chapters 367–377
34	May 9, 2006	978-1-4215-0505-3
Chapters 378–388
35	August 8, 2006	978-1-4215-0506-0
Chapters 389–398
36	November 14, 2006	978-1-4215-0507-7
Chapters 399–407

== 2014 English release (2-in-1 Edition) ==
No.	Release date	ISBN
1	March 11, 2014	978-1-4215-6594-1
2	May 13, 2014	978-1-4215-6595-8
3	July 8, 2014	978-1-4215-6616-0
4	September 9, 2014	978-1-4215-6617-7
5	November 11, 2014	978-1-4215-6618-4
6	January 13, 2015	978-1-4215-6619-1
7	March 10, 2015	978-1-4215-6620-7
8	May 12, 2015	978-1-4215-6621-4
9	July 14, 2015	978-1-4215-6622-1
10	September 8, 2015	978-1-4215-6623-8
11	November 10, 2015	978-1-4215-6632-0
12	January 12, 2016	978-1-4215-6633-7
13	March 8, 2016	978-1-4215-6634-4
14	May 10, 2016	978-1-4215-6635-1
15	July 12, 2016	978-1-4215-6636-8
16	September 13, 2016	978-1-4215-6637-5
17	November 8, 2016	978-1-4215-6638-2
18	January 10, 2017	978-1-4215-6639-9
19	March 14, 2017	978-1-4215-8580-2
