= Exploding watermelon stunt =

Act of breaking a watermelon with rubber bands

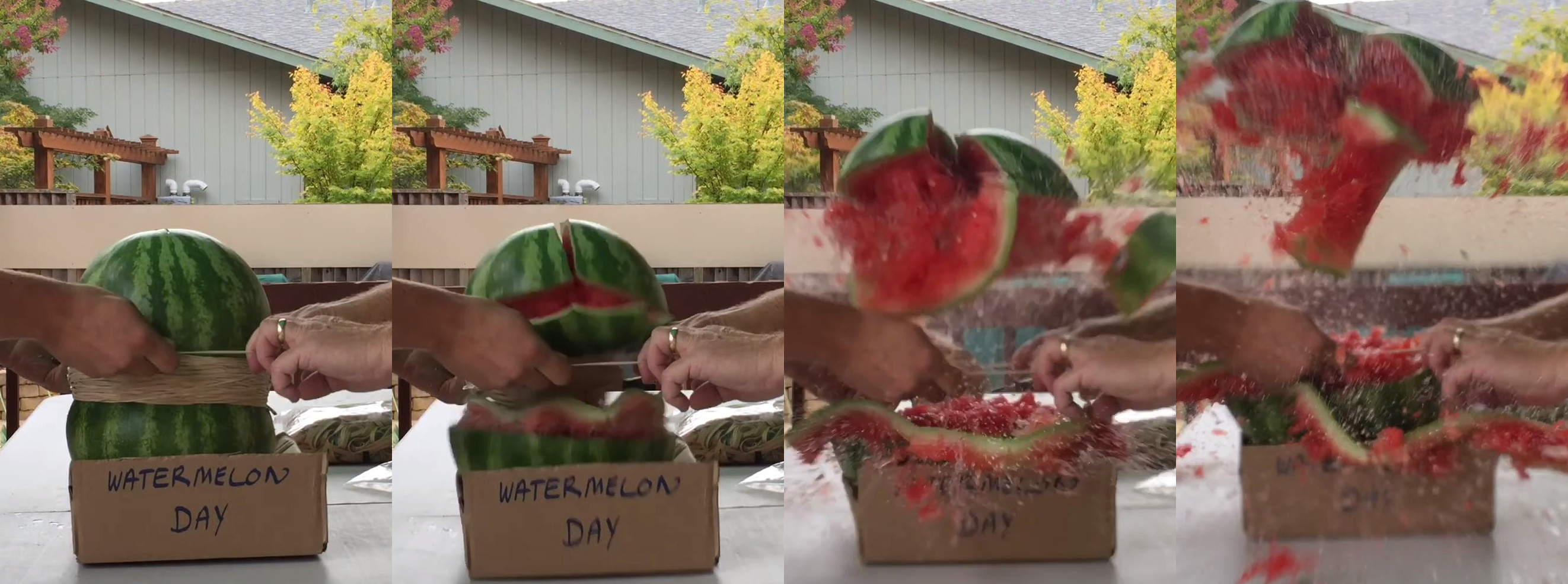
A watermelon exploding under the pressure of rubber bands

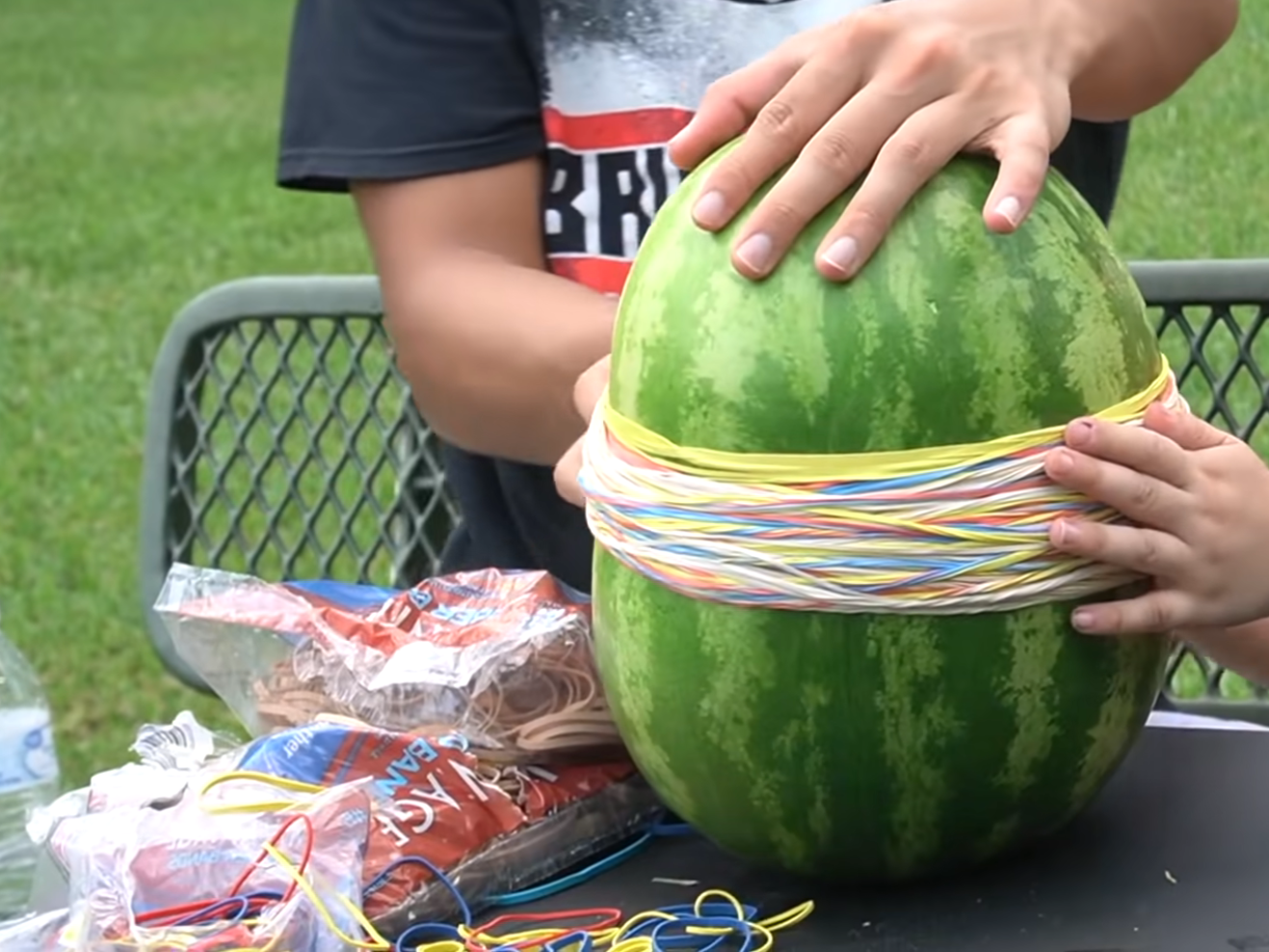
Rubber bands wrapped around a watermelon

The exploding watermelon stunt or exploding watermelon challenge involves wrapping rubber bands around a watermelon until the pressure of the rubber bands causes the watermelon to explode in a dramatic or spectacular fashion.

== BuzzFeed event ==
On April 8, 2016, the website BuzzFeed streamed the stunt live on Facebook. During the 45-minute stream, the event peaked at over 800,000 live watchers, and the resulting video of the event garnered millions of views. The event was parodied a few days later on The Tonight Show. The show had attempted the stunt in September 2015 with Olivia Wilde, but cut the segment short as it was taking too long.

The event generated discussion of the future of journalism where trivial events can garner significant attention.

== Challenge origin ==
The concept of putting rubber bands around a watermelon until it explodes first became popular on the internet as early as at least July 2012, when the stunt was filmed by The Slow Mo Guys with a very high frame-rate camera, but earlier videos date back at least to 2008.

== See also ==
- List of Internet phenomena
- Suikawari - traditional Japanese game involving attempting to split a watermelon using a stick while blindfolded
