= Suikawari =

Japanese game of splitting a watermelon

Suikawari (スイカ割り, suika-wari; lit. 'watermelon splitting') is a traditional Japanese game that involves splitting a watermelon with a stick while blindfolded. Played in the summertime, suikawari is most often seen at beaches, but also occurs at festivals, picnics, and other summer events.

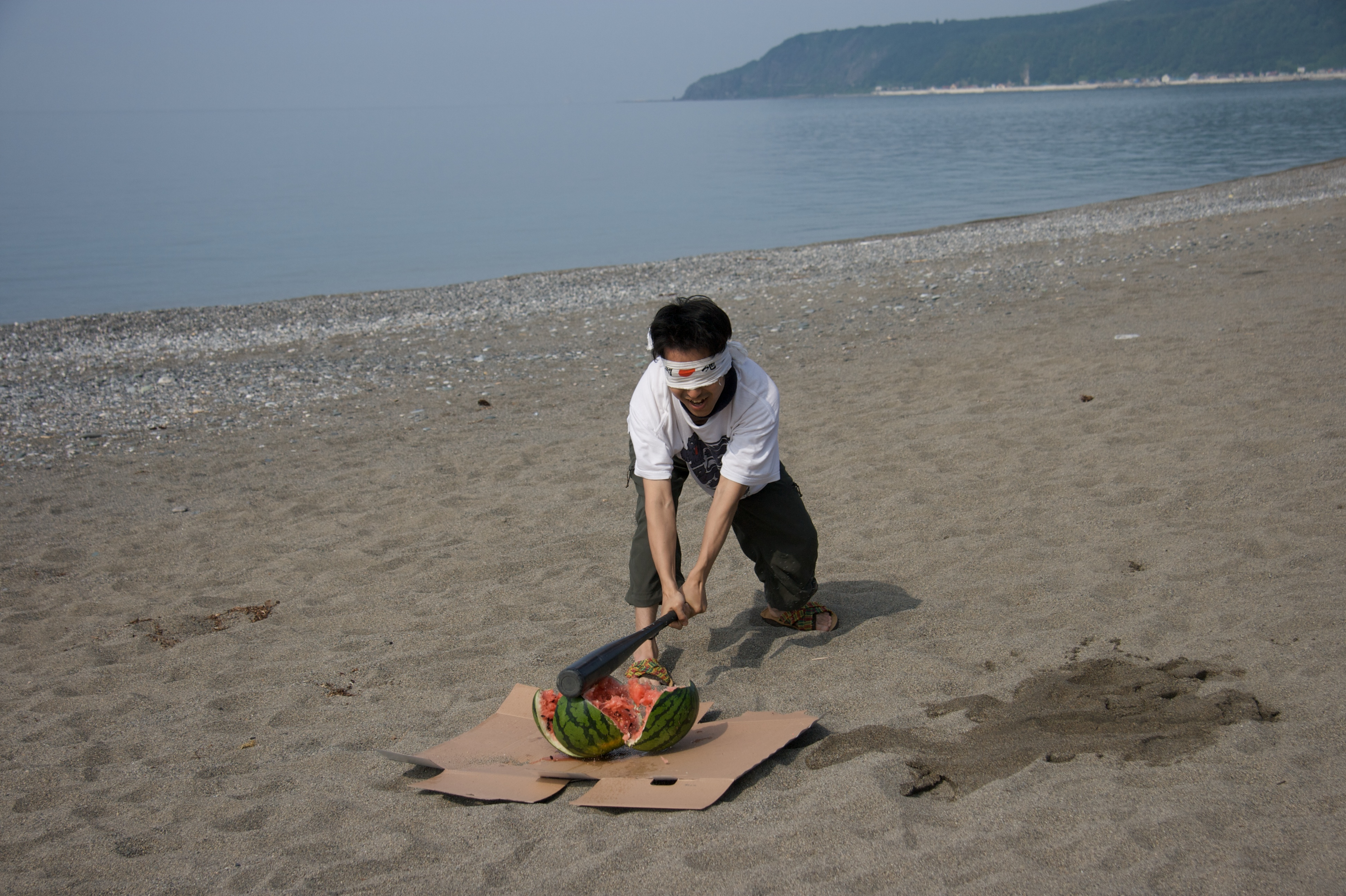
Suikawari being played on a beach in Japan.

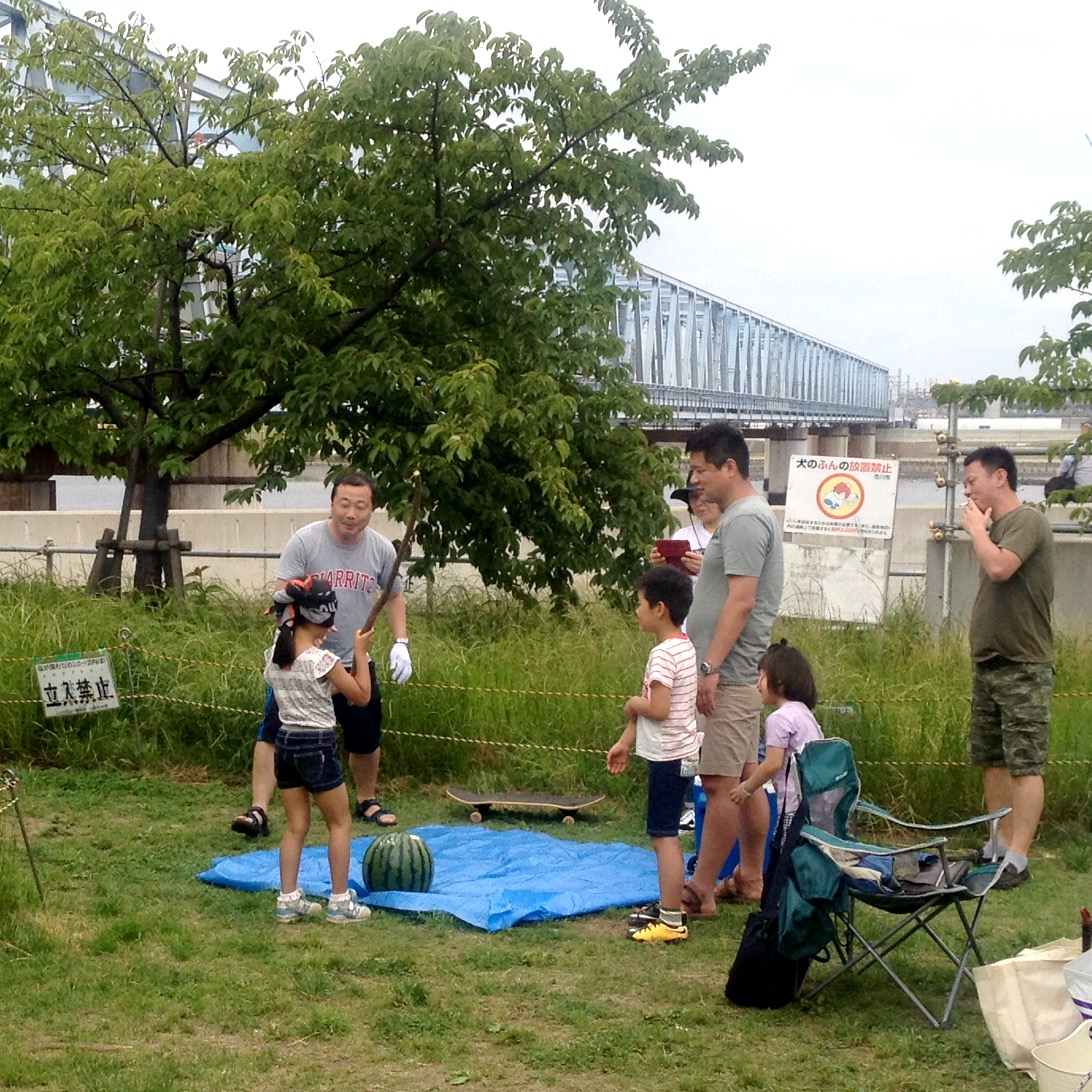
A family preparing to play suikawari at a picnic in Tokyo, 2018.

The rules are similar to piñata. A watermelon is placed, typically on a towel or other protection, on the sand. Each participant is in turn blindfolded, spun around three times, and handed a wooden stick, or bokken, to attempt to hit the watermelon; the first to crack it open wins. Other participants or teammates may give the player hints such as left/right or straight ahead.

Afterwards the chunks of watermelon produced are shared among participants.

== Rules ==
=== Japan Suika-Wari Association rules ===
The Japan Suika-Wari Association (JSWA), established by the Japan Agricultural Cooperative (JA), established a set of rules in 1991 governing the game. The JSWA was created by the JA to increase consumption of watermelon. The organization no longer exists. The rules established were as follows:

- Distance between player and watermelon: over 5m, and within 7m
- Stick: Circumference of 5cm; length equal to or less than 120cm.
- Material to use for blindfold: JSWA-recognized blindfolds. To verify that the player was truly blinded, observers were encouraged to drop a 10,000-yen note in front of the player.
- Watermelon: a well-ripened domestic melon.
- Time limit: 3 minutes.
- Judging: Judges should rate the player on how pretty a break between halves she managed to make. Players who cleaved the watermelon in equal halves could come close to a perfect score, while players who broke them into unequal parts would receive lower marks.
- Other details: Judges should have eaten at least 10 watermelons in the current year.

== See also ==
- Exploding watermelon stunt
