= List of Kaiji episodes =

The Japanese anime television series Kaiji: Ultimate Survivor is based on the first part, Gambling Apocalypse: Kaiji, of the manga series Kaiji, written and illustrated by Nobuyuki Fukumoto. The series was broadcast on Nippon TV from October 3, 2007, to April 2, 2008. (Note: Nippon TV listed the air dates for Kaiji: Ultimate Survivor on Tuesday at 24:59, which is effectively Wednesday at 0:59 a.m. JST.)

A second season, titled Kaiji: Against All Rules and based on the second part of the manga, Tobaku Hakairoku Kaiji, was announced by Weekly Young Magazine in 2011. It was broadcast on Nippon TV from April 6 to September 28, 2011. (Note: Nippon TV listed the air dates for Kaiji: Against All Rules on Tuesday at 24:59, which is effectively Wednesday at 0:59 a.m. JST.)

In the United States, Kaiji: Ultimate Survivor was streamed on the Joost service in December 2008. In July 2013, Crunchyroll announced the streaming rights to both seasons. In November 2020, Sentai Filmworks announced that they have licensed both seasons of the series for streaming on select digital outlets and home video release. Both season were released in Japanese with English subtitles on Blu-ray Disc on April 20, 2021.

== Series overview ==
| Season | Episodes | Japanese airdates | |
| Season | Episodes | First aired | Last aired |
|---|---|---|---|
| 1 | 26 | October 3, 2007 | April 2, 2008 |
| 2 | 26 | April 6, 2011 | September 28, 2011 |

== Episodes ==
=== Kaiji: Ultimate Survivor (2007–08) ===
| No. | Title | Directed by | Written by | Storyboarded by | Original release date |
|---|---|---|---|---|---|
| 01 | "Departure"; Transliteration: "Shukkō" (Japanese: 出航) | Nanako Shimazaki | Hideo Takayashiki | Tomihiko Ōkubo | October 3, 2007 |
| 02 | "Open Fire"; Transliteration: "Hibuta" (Japanese: 火蓋) | Ryōsuke Nakamura | Hideo Takayashiki | Yuzo Sato | October 10, 2007 |
| 03 | "Wager"; Transliteration: "Shōbu" (Japanese: 勝負) | Shigetaka Ikeda | Mitsutaka Hirota | Shigetaka Ikeda | October 17, 2007 |
| 04 | "Failure"; Transliteration: "Hatan" (Japanese: 破綻) | Park Jin-kyeong; Oyunam (assistant) | Kazuyuki Fudeyasu | Shigetaka Ikeda | October 24, 2007 |
| 05 | "Deadly Decision"; Transliteration: "Kesshi" (Japanese: 決死) | Masahiro Hosoda | Tadao Iwaki | Masahiro Hosoda | October 31, 2007 |
| 06 | "Rise and Fall"; Transliteration: "Kōbō" (Japanese: 興亡) | Kim Min-sun; Oyunam (assistant) | Hideo Takayashiki | Tomihiko Ōkubo | November 7, 2007 |
| 07 | "Proclamation"; Transliteration: "Kappa" (Japanese: 喝破) | Nanako Shimazaki | Mitsutaka Hirota | Nanako Shimazaki | November 14, 2007 |
| 08 | "Crushing Blow"; Transliteration: "Tettsui" (Japanese: 鉄槌) | Yoshifumi Sueda | Kazuyuki Fudeyasu | Toshiyuki Tsuru | November 21, 2007 |
| 09 | "Resurrection"; Transliteration: "Kaisei" (Japanese: 回生) | Kenichi Kawamura | Hideo Takayashiki | Hiroshi Aoyama | November 28, 2007 |
| 10 | "Messenger"; Transliteration: "Shisha" (Japanese: 使者) | Hiroyuki Tanaka | Mitsutaka Hirota | Toshiya Niidome | December 5, 2007 |
| 11 | "Revelry"; Transliteration: "Kyōen" (Japanese: 狂宴) | Shigetaka Ikeda | Kazuyuki Fudeyasu | Shigetaka Ikeda | December 12, 2007 |
| 12 | "Plunge"; Transliteration: "Tenraku" (Japanese: 転落) | Masahiro Hosoda | Hideo Takayashiki | Tomihiko Ōkubo | December 19, 2007 |
| 13 | "Monster"; Transliteration: "Kaibutsu" (Japanese: 怪物) | Ryōsuke Nakamura | Mitsutaka Hirota | Ryōsuke Nakamura | December 26, 2007 |
| 14 | "Ghost"; Transliteration: "Bōrei" (Japanese: 亡霊) | Yoshifumi Sueda | Kazuyuki Fudeyasu | Tetsurō Araki | January 9, 2008 |
| 15 | "Heavens"; Transliteration: "Tenkū" (Japanese: 天空) | Nanako Shimazaki | Hideo Takayashiki | Nanako Shimazaki | January 16, 2008 |
| 16 | "Fury"; Transliteration: "Dohatsu" (Japanese: 怒髪) | Kim Min-sun; Oyunam (assistant) | Tadao Iwaki | Kim Min-sun | January 23, 2008 |
| 17 | "Conversation"; Transliteration: "Kaiwa" (Japanese: 会話) | Kenichi Kawamura; Tadao Iwaki | Mitsutaka Hirota | Toshiya Niidome | January 30, 2008 |
| 18 | "Trifled"; Transliteration: "Honrō" (Japanese: 翻弄) | Oyunam | Kazuyuki Fudeyasu | Junichi Sakata | February 6, 2008 |
| 19 | "Limit"; Transliteration: "Genkai" (Japanese: 限界) | Masahiro Hosoda | Tomomi Yoshino | Masahiro Hosoda | February 13, 2008 |
| 20 | "Fierce God"; Transliteration: "Kishin" (Japanese: 鬼神) | Yoshifumi Sueda | Hideo Takayashiki | Yoshifumi Sueda | February 20, 2008 |
| 21 | "Heart's Blood"; Transliteration: "Shinketsu" (Japanese: 心血) | Hideo Hayashi | Mitsutaka Hirota | Hideo Hayashi | February 27, 2008 |
| 22 | "Punishment"; Transliteration: "Shikkō" (Japanese: 執行) | Hiroyuki Tanaka | Kazuyuki Fudeyasu | Hiroyuki Tanaka | March 5, 2008 |
| 23 | "Deceit"; Transliteration: "Jadō" (Japanese: 邪道) | Nanako Shimazaki | Tomomi Yoshino | Nanako Shimazaki | March 12, 2008 |
| 24 | "Conditions"; Transliteration: "Jōken" (Japanese: 条件) | Kim Min-sun; Oyunam (assistant) | Mitsutaka Hirota | Keiji Gotoh | March 19, 2008 |
| 25 | "Gone Pale"; Transliteration: "Sōhaku" (Japanese: 蒼白) | Yoshifumi Sueda | Kazuyuki Fudeyasu | Ryōsuke Nakamura | March 26, 2008 |
| 26 | "Afterglow"; Transliteration: "Zankō" (Japanese: 残光) | Yuzo Sato; Tadao Iwaki | Hideo Takayashiki | Yuzo Sato | April 2, 2008 |

=== Kaiji: Against All Rules (2011) ===
| No. overall | No. in season | Title | Directed by | Written by | Storyboarded by | Original release date |
|---|---|---|---|---|---|---|
| 27 | 01 | "Underground Hell"; Transliteration: "Chi no Goku" (Japanese: 地の獄) | Yuzo Sato | Hideo Takayashiki | Yuzo Sato | April 6, 2011 |
| 28 | 02 | "The Rules of the Game"; Transliteration: "Shōbu no Tessoku" (Japanese: 勝負の鉄則) | Hong Hun-pyo | Mitsutaka Hirota | Yoshiaki Kawajiri | April 13, 2011 |
| 29 | 03 | "Bits of Luck"; Transliteration: "Kyōun no Kakera" (Japanese: 強運の欠片) | Kim Min-sun | Hideo Takayashiki | Yoshiaki Kawajiri | April 20, 2011 |
| 30 | 04 | "The Beginnings of a Comeback"; Transliteration: "Gyakushū no Itoguchi" (Japanese: 逆襲の糸口) | Masaki Matsumura | Mitsutaka Hirota | Yoshiaki Kawajiri | April 27, 2011 |
| 30 | 05 | "Abuse and Endurance"; Transliteration: "Gyakutai to Nintai" (Japanese: 虐待と忍耐) | Woo Seung-wook | Hideo Takayashiki | Tomomi Fujiyama | May 4, 2011 |
| 31 | 06 | "The Storm Descends"; Transliteration: "Neppū no Tōrai" (Japanese: 熱風の到来) | Kenichi Kawamura | Mitsutaka Hirota | Kenichi Kawamura | May 11, 2011 |
| 33 | 07 | "Magic Dice"; Transliteration: "Mahō no Sai" (Japanese: 魔法の賽) | Tetsuo Yajima | Hideo Takayashiki | Hiroshi Kōjina | May 18, 2011 |
| 34 | 08 | "Divine Retribution"; Transliteration: "Ingaōhō" (Japanese: 因果応報) | Hong Hun-pyo | Mitsutaka Hirota | Morio Asaka | May 25, 2011 |
| 35 | 09 | "Cheers, and…" Transliteration: "Kassai, soshite..." (Japanese: 喝采、そして…) | Kim Min-sun | Hideo Takayashiki | Yoshiaki Kawajiri | June 1, 2011 |
| 36 | 10 | "The Last Gamble"; Transliteration: "Saigo no Bakuchi" (Japanese: 最後の博打) | Masaki Matsumura | Mitsutaka Hirota | Masaki Matsumura | June 8, 2011 |
| 37 | 11 | "Joy and Lament"; Transliteration: "Kanki to Tansei" (Japanese: 歓喜と嘆声) | Woo Seung-wook | Hideo Takayashiki | Yoshiaki Kawajiri | June 15, 2011 |
| 38 | 12 | "Heaven Falls, a Man Falls"; Transliteration: "Haten Hakan" (Japanese: 破天・破漢) | Jun Nakagawa; Tomomi Muraoka | Mitsutaka Hirota | Kenichi Kawamura | June 22, 2011 |
| 39 | 13 | "A Clue"; Transliteration: "Kōryaku no Itoguchi" (Japanese: 攻略の糸口) | Tetsuo Yajima | Hideo Takayashiki | Tetsuo Yajima | June 29, 2011 |
| 40 | 14 | "The Survivor's Road (Series Recap)"; Transliteration: "Burai no Kiseki (Sōshūhen)" (Japanese: 無頼の軌跡（総集編）) | Yuzo Sato | Hideo Takayashiki | Yuzo Sato | July 6, 2011 |
| 41 | 15 | "All an Act"; Transliteration: "Koke no Isshin" (Japanese: 虚仮の一心) | Hong Hun-pyo | Mitsutaka Hirota | Yoshiaki Kawajiri | July 13, 2011 |
| 42 | 16 | "The Curtain Rises"; Transliteration: "Kessen no Makuake" (Japanese: 決戦の幕開け) | Kim Min-sun | Hideo Takayashiki | Yoshiaki Kawajiri | July 20, 2011 |
| 43 | 17 | "Pointless Pounding"; Transliteration: "Fumō na Kantetsu" (Japanese: 不毛な貫徹) | Masaki Matsumura | Mitsutaka Hirota | Masaki Matsumura | July 27, 2011 |
| 44 | 18 | "Unyielding Gate"; Transliteration: "Teppeki no Mon" (Japanese: 鉄壁の門) | Woo Seung-wook | Hideo Takayashiki | Yoshiaki Kawajiri | August 3, 2011 |
| 45 | 19 | "Road to a Miracle"; Transliteration: "Kiseki no Kidō" (Japanese: 奇跡の軌道) | Jun Nakagawa; Tomomi Muraoka | Mitsutaka Hirota | Jun Nakagawa; Tomomi Muraoka | August 10, 2011 |
| 46 | 20 | "Destiny Gap"; Transliteration: "Shukuun no Sa" (Japanese: 宿運の差) | Tetsuo Yajima | Hideo Takayashiki | Tetsuo Yajima | August 17, 2011 |
| 47 | 21 | "Victory Secured"; Transliteration: "Kakujitsu na Shōri" (Japanese: 確実な勝利) | Hong Hun-pyo | Mitsutaka Hirota | Kenichi Kawamura | August 24, 2011 |
| 48 | 22 | "The Power of Money"; Transliteration: "Yukichi no Ikō" (Japanese: 諭吉の威光) | Kim Min-sun | Hideo Takayashiki | Hiroyuki Tanaka | August 31, 2011 |
| 49 | 23 | "On Thin Ice"; Transliteration: "Fūzen no Tomoshibi" (Japanese: 風前の灯火) | Masaki Matsumura | Mitsutaka Hirota | Masaki Matsumura | September 7, 2011 |
| 50 | 24 | "Meandering Silver Balls"; Transliteration: "Haikai Suru Gindama" (Japanese: 徘徊する銀玉) | Woo Seung-wook | Hideo Takayashiki | Yuzo Sato | September 14, 2011 |
| 51 | 25 | "Tears of Resentment"; Transliteration: "Ensa no Namida" (Japanese: 怨嗟の涙) | Kenichi Kawamura | Mitsutaka Hirota | Kenichi Kawamura | September 21, 2011 |
| 52 | 26 | "The Future is in Our Hands…"; Transliteration: "Mirai wa Bokura no..." (Japanese: 未来は僕らの…) | Yuzo Sato; Jun Nakagawa; Tomomi Muraoka | Hideo Takayashiki | Yuzo Sato | September 28, 2011 |

== See also ==
- List of Mr. Tonegawa: Middle Management Blues episodes
