= List of Mr. Tonegawa: Middle Management Blues episodes =

Mr. Tonegawa: Middle Management Blues
- Key visual
- No. of episodes: 24

Release
- Original network: Nippon TV
- Original release: July 4 – December 26, 2018

Mr. Tonegawa: Middle Management Blues is a Japanese anime television series based on the manga series Chūkan Kanriroku Tonegawa, written by Tensei Hagiwara and illustrated by Tomohiro Hashimoto and Tomoki Miyoshi. It is a spin-off to the Kaiji series by Nobuyuki Fukumoto. Animated by Madhouse, it was broadcast for twenty-four episodes on AnichU programming block from July 4 to December 26, 2018. The opening theme is "Sassou to Hashiru Tonegawa-kun" (颯爽と走るトネガワ君; lit. 'Gallantly Running Tonegawa') by Gesu no Kiwami Otome. The first ending theme is "Oki Tegami" (隠岐手紙; lit. 'Farewell Letter') by Pistol Takehara, and the second ending is "Kyougen Mawashi" (狂言回し; lit. 'Major Supporting Role') by NoisyCell.

Sentai Filmworks licensed the series and an English dub began streaming on Hidive on August 3, 2018.

The series also includes segments from 1-nichi Gaishutsuroku Hanchō spin-off manga about the foreman Ōtsuki.

== Episodes ==
No.	Title	Directed by	Written by	Original release date (Note: Nippon TV listed the air dates for the series on Tuesday at 25:59, which is effectively Wednesday at 1:59 a.m. JST.)
1	"Start Up"; Transliteration: "Shidō" (Japanese: 始動)	Kim Min-sun	Mitsutaka Hirota	July 4, 2018
The episode begins with a recap of the previous Kaiji series, introducing the president of the Teiai group, Kazutaka Hyōdō and his number-two man, Yukio Tonegawa with his all-encompassing powers of observation and demonic mental fortitude. Following his embarrassing loss to Kaiji, Tonegawa was forced to undergo the Grilling Grovel punishment. The story begins in the time before Tonegawa encountered Kaiji, when he is working in the debt collection section of the Teiai Finance group. One day he is called by Hyōdō and given the task of creating an exciting Game of Death involving the gullible people who are his financial victims and whom he despises. As a middle manager, Tonegawa feels caught between the countless men beneath him, and the domineering Hyōdō. He immediately gathers a project team, however they all wear the obligatory black suit and sunglasses and he cannot tell them apart. After saying their names, Tonegawa cannot remember which one is which, and they also have the same hobby, bowling. Frustrated at trying to remember their names, Tonegawa decides to call them all Gutter Balls and the first project meeting achieves nothing.
2	"Conjecture"; Transliteration: "Sontaku" (Japanese: 忖度)	Kang Tae-sik; Yūzō Satō (assistant)	Atsushi Maekawa	July 11, 2018
Overnight, Tonegawa makes a huge effort to remember the names of his ten-member project team and at the project meeting on the next day, Tonegawa calls for suggestions and ideas. It takes a long time before the black suit Jirō Saemonsaburō suggests the game rock-paper-scissors. Tonegawa praises his suggestion and is then flooded by other ideas. Tonegawa suddenly gets a cold shiver and Hyōdō enters the meeting room, killing the momentum Tonegawa built up. When asked by Hyōdō which is the winning suggestion, Tonegawa throws decision onto the black suits, but Kenji Yamazaki throws the responsibility back onto Tonegawa, forcing him to risk his entire career on his decision. In desperation, he wipes the board clean of suggestions, saying none are good enough and avoiding making a decision. He is pleased with his strategy, but then finds that Hyōdō has fallen asleep! Tonegawa feels the weight of being a middle manager, a lone man carrying the burden of pleasing his superior, and responsible for the performance of his subordinates.
3	"Griddle"; Transliteration: "Teppan" (Japanese: 鉄板)	Seo Soon-young; Makoto Fuchigami (assistant)	Kanichi Katō	July 18, 2018
Tonegawa schemes to recover the respect of his project team, after wiping out their suggestions at the meeting with Hyōdō. He takes them on a company field trip, but they vow not to be swayed by his ploy to bribe them. When they arrive at the Multitude House resort, one asks if there is a bowling alley nearby. Suppressing his anger at the question, Tonegawa succeeds in pleasing them with proposing a Kobe beef BBQ with free alcohol. However, Yamazaki is still skeptical, and he takes pleasure in discovering that the griddles are rusty. Undeterred, Tonegawa goes off and finds a huge hotplate, and another device for dropping food onto it. Only Yamazaki realizes that it is in fact the Grilling Grovel hotplate and the Grovel Enforcement Machine for punishing subordinates who offend Hyōdō. Later, when Tonegawa apologizes and offers Yamazaki some cooked beef, his resistance melts away, and Tonegawa knows that he has climbed from the abyss and recovered the trust and honor of his team.
4	"Adult"; Transliteration: "Otona" (Japanese: 大人)	Park Jai-ik; Koji Sawai (assistant)	Mitsutaka Hirota	July 25, 2018
With his position as leader restored on the company field trip, Tonegawa leaves after a long day at work, sneering at the men working overtime to appear more productive. He decides he must locate a solution himself and catches a train home to find what ordinary people think in that microcosm of society. While eating sushi, he comes up with the idea which he presents to the project team the next day. The game is called "Human Mahjong" (人間麻雀, Ningen Mājan), designed to foster betrayal, deception and dissent among the players. However, Saemon questions some aspects of the game and makes a very convincing presentation of his own idea, "Revolutionary Rock, Paper, Scissors", combining the well-known game with cards, restricting the available playing choices. Surprising himself and his men, Tonegawa makes a mature and adult decision, accepting Saemon's idea and rejecting his own. However, he renames the game "Restricted Rock, Paper, Scissors", thus stamping his own authority onto the idea.
5	"Serious Soul-Searching"; Transliteration: "Mōsei" (Japanese: 猛省)	Kim Sang-yeop; Makoto Fuchigami (assistant)	Atsushi Maekawa	August 1, 2018
Tonegawa approaches Hyōdō to present his Revolutionary Rock, Paper, Scissors proposal, but Hyōdō wants to watch an entertaining movie instead. Hyōdō falls asleep leaving Tonegawa with the difficult options of waking him or letting him miss the climax. Torturous minutes pass until Tonegawa decided to stop the film. Over an hour and a half later, Tonegawa has fallen asleep and his snoring wakes up Hyōdō who immediately berates him for allowing him to miss the climax. With 5 days left to present his proposal, Tonegawa then finds that Hyōdō is going to Hawaii for a 10 days holiday. Yamazaki reveals that Hyōdō is only in a good mood in the few minutes after his bath if the angle of his eyebrows is less than 40 degrees. Tonegawa plans to intercept him, however Hyōdō emerges wearing a face mask, and so Tonegawa aborts his plan. Tonegawa then flies to Hawaii where he manages to get the proposal approved and throws a party for his team, but they are all late for work the next day after a drunken night out. To atone, they shave their heads, leaving Tonegawa again unable to tell them apart.
6	"Self-Destruction"; Transliteration: "Jibaku" (Japanese: 自爆)	Kim Min-sun; Kotono Watanabe (assistant)	Kanichi Katō	August 8, 2018
At the next meeting, the black suits are wearing name tags, and Tonegawa uses a different strategy, pitting them against each other to suggest the best venue at the following meeting. Again Saemon makes a stunning presentation and suggests the luxury liner, the Espoir. Ebitani is last to present, and he tables a voluminous document with 100 reasons why the venue should be a restaurant, completely ignoring the key requirements. Later, Tonegawa encourages the dejected Ebitani over dinner, sensing that he could be more effective if not overwhelmed by excessive detail. When Hyōdō arrives back from Hawaii, angry after a bumpy flight, he is confronted by Ebitani who asks him for hand-prints to use on the Revolutionary Rock, Paper, Scissors cards. The furious Hyōdō fires Ebitani and reduces Tonegawa's salary after what Tonegawa realizes was a miscalculation.
7	"Transmission"; Transliteration: "Man'en" (Japanese: 蔓延)	Kang Tae-sik; Yūzō Satō (assistant)	Mitsutaka Hirota	August 15, 2018
Tonegawa's project team works on the details of how the Restricted Rock, Paper, Scissors game will be played. Again Saemon comes up with the best idea for the design of the three cards, skeletal hands, although Tonegawa becomes frustrated with his team who seem to lack initiative. Disaster strikes when Kawasaki is diagnosed with the flu, as Tonegawa fears that he may have infected the rest of the team. Tonegawa sends them all out for flu injections and he implements a full-scale hygiene campaign. Even with all his precautions, Tonegawa catches the flu, leaving his men leaderless, but he delegates the slightly more senior Gonda to take charge. Gonda struggles as he unaccustomed to making decisions or giving orders and freely admits that he is not a leader, but then he also develops the flu. With support from the team, Gonda rises to the occasion, but when Tonegawa returns two days later, he finds that the entire team has now contracted the flu.
8	"Shrimp"; Transliteration: "Ebi" (Japanese: 海老)	Kim Sang-yeop; Makoto Fuchigami (assistant)	Keiichirō Kawaguchi	August 22, 2018
Tonegawa meets Ebitani who makes an effort to apologize, but makes another misjudgment. A few days later they meet again, and this time Ebitani takes Tonegawa to a seminar for a pyramid scheme, but Tonegawa is unable to convince Ebitani or any of the others there that it is a scam. Later Tonegawa receives a letter from Ebitani, admitting his mistake, sent from the Kosuge Detention Center after everyone in the seminar was arrested for breaking the Commercial Transactions Law. Ebitani then has another idea, and invents an "Ebi Roll", containing cooked lobster in the shell, but at a taste test with Tokegawa's project team, they all find it inedible. Ebitani is devastated, especially after buying 200 kg of frozen lobster. Out of compassion, the project team buy up his supply of lobsters, but days later, Tonegawa receives another letter from Ebitani. To Tonegawa's horror, Ebitani was so inspired by the team buying his lobsters, he bought a ton to resell.
9	"Fried Cutlets"; Transliteration: "Katsu" (Japanese: カツ)	Seo Soon-young; Kotono Watanabe (assistant)	Atsushi Maekawa	August 29, 2018
The Teiai Corporation conducts its annual round of hiring interviews and Tonegawa manages the ruthless process of weeding out those who are unsuitable because they do not fit the preferred type. After some interviews, Tonegawa gives his black suit assistant Kawasaki the responsibility of evaluating the next candidate who turns out to be Ogio's brother. To Tonegawa's approval, Kawasaki rejects him because his name and looks are too similar to an existing employee. The next candidate seems to be a perfect fit for the company, but Tonegawa rejects him because his appearance departs too far from the undistinguished men they desire. Tonegawa leaves for lunch, and uncharacteristically goes to the "Cutlet Bog", a cutlet restaurant. After seeing another diner eating a small portion, he orders the large size, not realizing that the other portion is the small size. When his meal arrives, he is horrified at the huge size of the meal that no-one has ever been able to finish. Unable to back down, Tonegawa takes the challenge, and becomes the first person to ever finish the bowl. He returns to the office late after the huge lunch, however he is called into Hyōdō's office and invited to taste the new Teiai cutlet lunch box. Tonegawa finds himself wedged between his duty and dealing with the aftereffects of his lunchtime experience.
10	"Rehearsal"; Transliteration: "Riha" (Japanese: リハ)	Park Jai-ik; Koji Sawai (assistant)	Kanichi Katō	September 5, 2018
The rules of the proposed Restricted Rock, Paper, Scissors game are finalized and the cards and equipment are prepared for the first test. However, the black suits neglected to solve the problem of counting the cards as they are withdrawn from the game and inserted into large boxes. When they tell Tonegawa that his solution of having men hide inside the boxes to count is impossible to implement, he leaves, delegating the team to solve the problem. Yamazaki provides a solution, creating comfortable habitats inside each box for each of the men. At the dress rehearsal, the test proceeds smoothly, but the men are not desperate gamblers and lack motivation. Endō Yūji, President of Finance, offers to help by providing a heavy loser named Watanabe to give them an insight into a gambler's mentality, and he then creates a game-playing environment. However, his ideas are a miserable failure, wasting Tonegawa two valuable days of preparation.
11	"Business Trip"; Transliteration: "Shucchō" (Japanese: 出張)	Lee Dong-ik; Kim Seong-beom; Makoto Fuchigami (assistant)	Keiichirō Kawaguchi	September 12, 2018
Tonegawa catches the Shinkansen to Fukuoka for a business meeting and hopes to enjoy some time away from Hyōdō's constant demands. However, he receives a call from Hyōdō asking if yoga is right for his bad back. Unfortunately, the phone call terminates twice in mid-conversation as the train enters tunnels. This gives the impression that Tonegawa is being rude to the president who then blocks future calls from him and Tonegawa immediately catches a return train to resolve the misunderstanding. That night, he is called to the Kansai office in Osaka and looks forward to days of gourmet dining. On arrival, Tonegawa tries to create a relaxed atmosphere with the team, but the branch head Kinezaki completely ruins the atmosphere. After 7 days, the branch is full of tension. On the last evening, Tonegawa creates the conditions for a farewell party which is again foiled by Kinezaki. Meanwhile, back in Tokyo, black suit Saemon causes a break-out of fashion among the team, except for Yamazaki. Tonegawa returns and castigates the men for looking childish, then gives them a lesson in how to dress well and stay within the official regulations.
12	"Fake"; Transliteration: "Ese" (Japanese: 似非)	Park Si-hu; Yūzō Satō (assistant)	Atsushi Maekawa	September 19, 2018
Hyōdō tells Tonegawa that someone is out to get him after he interprets seemingly unrelated minor incidents as threats on his life. Tonegawa suspects a persecution complex, but Hyōdō insists on a double being found as a decoy. Tonegawa and Yamazaki eventually chance on an exact double, a chef in an organic diner, Masayasu Honda (Masayan). Masayan volunteers to help, but his personality is completely wrong so Yamazaki works to turn him into a dark and twisted character like the president. Finally, after two months training, Masayan has become more authentic than the original, but Hyōdō has already forgotten about his request and Endō Yūji dumps Masayan by the roadside. Yamazaki is distraught at losing Masayan and after a day of searching for him in the rain, they find him. At Yamazaki's request, Tonegawa agrees to keep Masayan at Teiai as insurance, just in case a double is needed in the future.
13	"Set Sail"; Transliteration: "Shukkō" (Japanese: 出航)	Kim Sang-yeop; Kotono Watanabe (assistant)	Kanichi Katō	October 3, 2018
As Tonegawa's project team prepare for the inaugural diabolical Restricted Rock, Paper, Scissors game, he is called into the office of Hyōdō. Hyōdō asks Tonegawa a series of psychological questions to test his loyalty and fortunately Tonegawa provides satisfactory answers. The following day, the first game commences aboard the cruise ship Espoir, but the hapless losers question aspects of the game. Tonegawa silences them by giving an insulting, but motivating speech, greatly impressing Yamazaki. Three days later, the second voyage commences with 90 players, but Tonegawa has lost his voice and Yamazaki has to deputize. He starts well, but begins to lose confidence, however he recovers and manages to run a successful game. Unfortunately Hyōdō falls asleep and misses the entire event.
14	"Going Out"; Transliteration: "Gaishutsu" (Japanese: 外出)	Kim Min-sun; Makoto Fuchigami (assistant)	Mitsutaka Hirota	October 10, 2018
In the Teiai underground oppressive forced labour camp, the fallen struggle to repay their debts. Using money he won from playing Underground Chinchiro, Foreman Ōtsuki Tarō buys a one-day outside pass and attempts to live life to the fullest. Starting in the afternoon, he casually spends the remainder of the day doing ordinary activities. However, the next morning he buys a suit and goes to a stand-up soba bar. He orders from the menu, drinks glasses of draught beer, and successfully intimidates the other office workers who are just eating noodles and drinking tea. On his next day outside, Ōtsuki basks in the sun for eight hours in his home town of Kinshi-cho. The next morning he visits a Chinese restaurant from his student days, planning to order his favorite dish, Crab Fried Rice. However, he is intrigued by a new menu item, Omelette Rice and orders it instead, choosing risk over a safe choice. When it arrives, is looks like a plain omelette with rice, however he finds it delicious and enjoys the meal. Before he leaves, the chef presents him with a complimentary small portion of Crab Fried Rice, meaning that he remembered Ōtsuki from 25 years earlier. Ōtsuki happily returns to the labour camp after a very fulfilling excursion.
15	"Spree"; Transliteration: "Gōyū" (Japanese: 豪遊)	Park Si-hu; Yūzō Satō (assistant)	Mitsutaka Hirota	October 17, 2018
Foreman Ōtsuki buys another one-day outside pass and agrees to help fellow inmate Takuya Numakawa make the best of his day above ground. They spend hours reading and discussing manga, then eat an inexpensive but delicious traditional meal. Later, Ōtsuki finds a local summer festival, where they enjoy themselves eating street food. Ōtsuki then buys take-away food for the organizing committee and are invited to drink with them until dawn, greatly impressing Numakawa. Ōtsuki spends his next one-day pass in Hibiya, but is closely shadowed by the black suit Miyamoto. Ōtsuki first visits an "antenna shop" (Note: Further information:) to buy some local snacks and then soaks his feet in a supermarket foot bath. They then sample free food provided by the Chamber of Commerce, where Miyamoto eventually succumbs, joining Ōtsuki in his pleasure-seeking quest until after the return deadline. One day, Tonegawa encounters Ōtsuki in the Cutlet Bog on another one-day pass. Ōtsuki mistakenly orders the large serving of pork cutlet, but then embarrasses Tonegawa into ordering it as well. They later leave in extreme discomfort after each eating a mountain of pork.
16	"Natural Enemy"; Transliteration: "Tenteki" (Japanese: 天敵)	Park Jai-ik; Makoto Fuchigami (assistant)	Keiichirō Kawaguchi	October 24, 2018
Tonegawa's position as Hyōdō's number-two man is under threat from Yoshihiro Kurosaki who appears to say the right things even if they contradict Hyōdō. Tonegawa tries to follow Kurosaki's lead, but almost fails by being too forthright. When buying a thoroughbred racehorse, Hyōdō insists Tonegawa buy one too, one that looks like a nag. However, Tonegawa's horse becomes a winner, and Hyōdō and claims Tonegawa's horse as his own, swapping the horse's names. On race day, Kurosaki's horse is the winner, and after the race, Hyōdō renames Kurosaki's horse as his own.
17	"Unofficial Announcement"; Transliteration: "Naiji" (Japanese: 内示)	Kim Sang-yeop; Kotono Watanabe (assistant)	Kanichi Katō	October 31, 2018
It is Autumn, the time for performance reviews and staff transfers in the Teiai Group. After work, Yamazaki is invited out for drinks by Kikuchi and they meet Junichi Hagio and Nagata in the bar. Yamazaki secretly knows that all three are destined for transfer, but they propose that he join their group to change Teiai from a top-down to a bottom-up organization, placing him in an awkward situation. As the day for the transfer announcements approaches, everyone except the effected parties knows who will be moved out. Kikuchi, Hagio and Nagata are finally told that they will be sent to the remote South Hateruma Island office, and at their farewell party, the black suits drink too much and begin to embarrass themselves. Tonegawa arrives late with farewell gifts and he encourages the three transferees to strive to return to head office. When, they scoff at his suggestion, he reveals that he also has been sent to the island office.
18	"Conformity"; Transliteration: "Dōchō" (Japanese: 同調)	Kim Min-sun; Koji Sawai (assistant)	Atsushi Maekawa	November 7, 2018
After a health check-up at Koudan Hospital, Tonegawa receives a string of "C"s and is advised to modify aspects of his lifestyle and eat a healthier diet. Former rugby football player, Doushita Kouji suggests that the black suits do likewise, and he even begins to monitor Tonegawa's diet. Tonegawa is reduced to eating his favorite foods secretly, however Doushita catches Tonegawa with a pork cutlet in the washroom. At his second check-up, Tonegawa scores a string of "A"s, however his opinion of the obsessive Doushita is a "C". Meanwhile, Foreman Ōtsuki has another one-day outside pass and sees a fellow inmate who appears to be aimlessly wasting his time. However, as Ōtsuki visits his favorite eating places, the other inmate appears there as well, ordering the same dishes. For the rest of the day, they eerily seem to go to the same places and enjoy the same pleasures, but never speak or make eye contact. Finally they arrive at a restaurant and order the same meal, but the other inmate orders something extra. Risking everything, Ōtsuki also orders the same accompaniments, but finds it delicious. They return separately to the vast labour camp, and Ōtsuki surprisingly encounters the other inmate.
19	"Newcomer"; Transliteration: "Shinjin" (Japanese: 新人)	Park Jai-ik; Satoshi Matsubara (assistant)	Keiichirō Kawaguchi	November 14, 2018
Three new replacement staff members join Tonegawa's team: Tsukui, a temp, Yaotome, from another company and Saeko Nishiguchi, a woman, a rarity among the black suits. Tonegawa warns his team to avoid all forms of sexual harassment, and soon Nishiguchi becomes an integral part of the team. However, she and Saemon encounter each other outside work and Saemon falls for her. Meanwhile, when Tonegawa has a meeting with Hyōdō, Yaotome ingratiates himself with the president by praising his spoken English. Hyōdō then spends a lot of time with Yaotome and Tonegawa feels that his position is threatened. Then, at a dinner, Yaotome almost embarrasses himself with glowing praise for Hyōdō, but he is forgiven, making Tonegawa's position even more vulnerable.
20	"Entertainment"; Transliteration: "Settai" (Japanese: 接待)	Kang Tae-sik; Yūzō Satō (assistant)	Mitsutaka Hirota	November 21, 2018
In a scene from the past, Tonegawa is taken to a Teiai underground casino to play pachinko against the "Bog" an unbeatable machine. However, the machine has been rigged in his favor, and although the casino manager, Ichijō Seiya acts horrified that the casino is losing, he demonstrates all of the controls can be set to achieve the desired outcome for Teiai. Meanwhile, foreman Ōtsuki and his assistant, Numakawa, have one-day outside pass from the subterranean labor camp, and use the time buying snacks to replenish the stock in their underground shop. Ōtsuki is also looking for an irresistible item that will bring in extra money, and has the idea of selling a six-month contract for cut-price snack mix. Most of the laborers sign up, but quickly tire of eating the same snack, even after finding creative recipes to utilize it. However, six months later, on the day that they are able to cancel the contract, they discover Ōtsuki is away on another one-day outside pass.
21	"Slander"; Transliteration: "Chūshō" (Japanese: 中傷)	Kim Sang-yeop; Kotono Watanabe (assistant)	Atsushi Maekawa	November 28, 2018
Black Suit Nakata reports to Tonegawa about the Teiai Twitter account which has little activity and provocative comments. Tonegawa takes over management of the account, but with little progress, and spamming criticism increases. Tonegawa then tries to outwit the main critic with help from Seamon, but fails miserably. Saemon deduces that the tweets come from someone within the company causing Tonegawa to become paranoid. Meanwhile, foreman Ōtsuki plans another Chinchiro game, but finds that Odagiri, foreman of Team C, has bought a tablet and is showing movies, drawing the inmates away from Ōtsuki's game. On his next one-day outside pass, Ōtsuki intercepts Odagiri who is looking to download more movies and ask him out for drinks.
22	"Conclusions"; Transliteration: "Kōhen" (Japanese: 後編)	Park Jai-ik; Koji Sawai (assistant)	Atsushi Maekawa	December 5, 2018
Ōtsuki invites Odagiri to a local restaurant for food and drinks and discovers that Odagiri is inexperienced in society and he easily impresses Odagiri with his choice of food and drink. Before long, Odagiri is drunk and Ōtsuki proposes a merger of their movie showing and Chinchiro enterprises in the Teiai labour camp. Odagiri agrees, but before he seals the deal, Ōtsuki admits that he has never seen the movie Once Upon a Time in America and Odagiri, the restaurant owner and the patrons in the insist on watching the nearly four hour long Director's Cut, thus not concluding the deal before their curfew. Meanwhile, Tonegawa is still managing the Teiai Twitter account and deduces that the critical tweets are coming from someone within Teiai. Saemon discovers that the culprit is Ebitani, and Tonegawa and the team confront him outside the building and kidnap him. Later, Ebitani wakes up in a prison cell with a computer, and Tonegawa offers to release him if he can attract 100,000 followers to the Teiai Twitter account.
23	"Premonition"; Transliteration: "Yokan" (Japanese: 予感)	Park Si-hu; Makoto Fuchigami (assistant)	Kanichi Katō	December 12, 2018
Tonegawa attends a 15 year class reunion at his old high school, intrigued at how his classmates developed. He is embarrassed by the boisterous ones which he regards as failures, while he notices the successful ones are quietly networking. He meets Kagawa Maho, a girl he rejected while at school who convinces him to relax and behave like a youngster again. Tonegawa eventually ends up staying and enjoying himself. Meanwhile, Ōtsuki and Numakawa are on one-day outside passes but Ōtsuki has a premonition of becoming ill which will prevent him playing board games the following day. Ōtsuki takes every precaution, staying in an apartment and cooking a healthy hotpot. Black suit Miyamoto even arrives with some umeboshi to help Ōtsuki beat the virus. The next day, Ōtsuki has fully recovered, but Miyamoto has caught the bug and spends the following six days of his vacation in bed.
24	"Final Destination"; Transliteration: "Shūchaku" (Japanese: 終着)	Kim Min-sun; Yūzō Satō (assistant)	Mitsutaka Hirota	December 26, 2018
Hyōdō is bored with traditional entertainment, and summons Tonegawa to announce he has an idea for a game to the death called Human Derby which is to be held at the uncompleted Starside Hotel. Three days later, Tonegawa's team is assigned to observe the diabolically destructive diversion where contestants who are heavily in debt to Teiai participate in the deadly game. Yamazaki does not attend as he had applied for time off, and before he can finish reading his team's messages about the event, his cell phone battery expires, so the details of the event are not revealed. On another occasion, Tonegawa attends the wedding of one of his team members, Keiichi Ogino. The wedding proceeds predictably with only the occasional mishaps. However, during the photo session, Tonegawa's team of black suits and Ogino break into a flash mob dance routine and Tonegawa uncharacteristically relaxes and joins in the celebrations.

== See also ==
- List of Kaiji episodes
