= List of Pleasant Goat and Big Big Wolf episodes =

Pleasant Goat and Big Big Wolf is a Chinese animated television series produced by Creative Power Entertaining. Its first season, containing 530 episodes, premiered on August 3, 2005, on the children's channel Hangzhou Television (杭州电视台少儿频道) in China. As of July 2026, Pleasant Goat and Big Big Wolf has broadcast 40 works with 3,207 episodes (45 mainline seasons with 2,528 episodes, 12 online short dramas with 679 episodes), 12 movies (10 animated movies, 2 live-action movies), and 5 stage plays.

The animation series is based on the interesting stories between the two major ethnic groups of sheep and wolves, telling the story of the struggle between sheep and wolves to peace.

== TV series ==
For the first season of the television series, both the opening and the ending themes are "Biekan Wo Zhi Shi Yizhi Yang" (别看我只是一只羊, "Even Though I'm Just a Little Goat") by Ivy Koo.

The second season, titled Pleasant Goat Sports Game (羊羊运动会, "A Goats' Sports Meeting") and containing 60 episodes, began airing on October 23, 2008, on CCTV-14. Both the opening and the ending themes are "Biekan Wo Zhi Shi Yizhi Yang" by Ivy Koo.

The third season, titled Joys of Seasons (羊羊快乐的一年, "A Goats' Happy Year") and containing 100 episodes, began airing on May 1, 2010, on Zhejiang Television (ZJTV). The opening theme is "Biekan Wo Zhi Shi Yizhi Yang" by Yang Peiyi and the ending theme is "Dajia Yiqi Xiyangyang" (大家一起喜羊羊, "Let's Happy(or Weslie) Together") by Bibi Zhou. This season was also issued worldwide by Disney later.

The fourth season, titled Smart Dodging (奇思妙想喜羊羊, "Weslie with Innovative Ideas") and containing 60 episodes, began broadcasting on July 1, 2011, on ZJTV. Both the opening and the ending themes are "Smart Dodging" by Xiyangyang Tongxing Hechangtuan (喜羊羊童星合唱团, "Weslie Child Stars' Chorus").

The fifth season, titled Happy, Happy, Bang! Bang! (给快乐加油, "Cheering for Happiness") and containing 100 episodes, began airing on October 15, 2011, on ZJTV. Both the opening theme and the ending theme are "Happy, Happy, Bang! Bang!" by Xiyangyang Tongsheng Hechangtuan (喜羊羊童声合唱团, "Weslie Children's Chorus").

The sixth season, titled The Athletic Carousel (竞技大联盟, "The Great Alliance of Sports") and containing 60 episodes, aired between June 30 and July 3, 2012, on ZJTV. Both the opening theme and the ending theme are "Kuaile Jingji-chang" (快乐竞技场, "A Happy Arena") by Queena Cui.

The seventh season, titled The Happy Diary (开心日记, "The Happy Diary"), aired between December 8 and 30, 2012, on ZJTV, and it is made up of 60 episodes. Both the opening and the ending themes are "Biekan Wo Zhi Shi Yizhi Yang" by Ivy Koo.

The 60-episode eighth season with the title Happy Formula (开心方程式, "The Happy Formula") began airing on July 26, 2013, on CCTV-1. Both the opening and the ending themes are "Biekan Wo Zhi Shi Yizhi Yang" by Ivy Koo.

The ninth season is titled Paddi the Amazing Chef (懒羊羊当大厨, "Paddi Becomes the Great Cook") and consists of 52 twenty-five-minute episodes. This season was broadcast between December 20, 2013 and January 10, 2014, on CCTV-1. Both the opening and the ending themes are "Paddi the Amazing Chef" by Purple Lee.

The tenth season titled Dear Little Wish (羊羊小心愿, "The Goats' Little Wishes") includes 60 episodes. It aired between July 30 and August 12, 2014, on Aniworld Satellite Television (also known as Golden Eagle Cartoon Channel, 金鹰卡通卫视 or 金鹰卡通频道). Both the opening and the ending themes are "Dear Little Wish" by Purple Lee. This season was also issued in the US by Amazon.com.

The eleventh season, named The Tailor's Closet (衣橱大冒险, "The Great Adventure with the Closet") and made up of 60 episodes, premiered on Aniworld TV September 4, 2014. Both the opening and the ending themes are "Baibian Xiao Caifeng" (百变小裁缝, "The Ever-changing Tailors") by Purple Lee.

The twelfth season with the name Love You Babe (妈妈乐疯狂, "Mom is Ecstatic") was broadcast on Aniworld between February 12 and 24, 2015. It contains 60 episodes. Both the opening and the ending themes are "Love You Babe" by Purple Lee.

With the title Adventures in the Primitive World (原始世界历险记, "Adventures in the Primitive World"), the sixty-episode thirteenth season, aired on Aniworld (but BTV Kaku Kids Channel (formerly Kaku Animation Channel, 卡酷少儿 or 卡酷动画, surpassed Aniworld later though) between August 17 and 29, 2015. Both the opening and the ending themes are "Zhiji" (知己, "Bosom Friends") by Purple Lee.

The fourteenth season titled Marching to the New Wonderland (嘻哈闯世界, "Marching to the World Happily (or Hip-hop)") has 60 episodes and aired between January 15 and 28, 2016, on Aniworld. The opening theme is "Marching to the New Wonderland" by Purple Lee, and the ending theme is "Biekan Wo Zhi Shi Yizhi Yang" by Ivy Koo.

The fifteenth season is named The Little Detective (羊羊小侦探, "Goats the Little Detectives"). It has 60 episodes and aired between July 9 and 17, 2016, on CCTV-14. The opening theme is "The Little Detective" by Li Jiji and Cou Shi, and the ending theme is "Biekan Wo Zhi Shi Yizhi Yang" by Ivy Koo.

As a sequel to Marching to the New Wonderland, the sixteenth season Adventures in the Sea (深海历险记, "Adventures in the Deep Sea"), including 60 episodes, firstly aired between January 9 and 23, 2017, on Aniworld TV. The opening theme is "Lanse Manyou" (蓝色漫游, "The Blue Wondering") by Hua Xue and the ending theme is "Biekan Wo Zhi Shi Yizhi Yang" by Ivy Koo.

The seventeenth season, titled War of Invention (发明大作战, "The Great War of Invention"), was broadcast between July 12 and 25, 2017, on Aniworld. It includes 60 episodes. The opening theme is "War of Invention" by Huang Jing, and the ending theme is "Biekan Wo Zhi Shi Yizhi Yang" by Ivy Koo.

Titled Flying Island: The Sky Adventure (奇幻天空岛, "The Fantastic Sky Islands"), the 60-episode eighteenth season is the third season of the Marching to the New Wonderland series. It aired between January 27 and February 7, 2018, on Aniworld. The opening theme is "Xi-ha Chuang Yunduan" (嘻哈闯云端, "Marching to the Clouds Happily (or Hip-hop)") by Cou Shi, and the ending theme is "Marching to the New Wonderland" by Purple Lee.

The nineteenth season Mighty Little Defenders (羊村守护者, "Goat Village's Defenders") is the second season of the War of Invention series. The season began broadcasting on Aniworld on January 18, 2019, and finished on January 26. The opening theme is "Yonggan Xiangqian" (勇敢向前, "Marching Bravely") by Xie Lin, and the ending theme is "Biekan Wo Zhi Shi Yizhi Yang" by Ivy Koo.

The twentieth season Rescue Across Time (跨时空救兵, "Reinforcements That Cross Space-Time") is a sequel of Mighty Little Defenders, however, this season also counts as the fourth season of the Marching to the New Wonderland series. The season began broadcasting on Aniworld Satellite Television, Youku, Tudou, iQiyi, Tencent Video, Mango TV, PPTV, IPTV, OTT on July 12, 2019, and finished on July 21. The opening theme is "Shengli de Zhongdian" (胜利的终点, "The Terminal of Victory") by Liufu Xinhong, and the ending theme is "Marching to the New Wonderland" by Purple Lee.

The twenty-first season The Intriguing Alien Guests (奇趣外星客, "Trolly Alien") is the second season of the Mighty Little Defenders series. This season began broadcasting on Aniworld on January 10, 2020, and finished on January 19. The opening theme is "Shouhu Zhiguang" (守护之光, The Light of Defense) by Wei Zunguang and Xie Lin, and the ending theme is "Biekan Wo Zhi Shi Yizhi Yang" by Ivy Koo.

The twenty-second season Against the Dark Force (异国大营救, "Rescue in the Foreign Country") is the third season of the Mighty Little Defenders series. This season began broadcasting on Aniworld Satellite Television, Youku, iQiyi, Tencent Video, Xigua Video, Mango TV, IPTV, OTT on July 17, 2020, and finished on July 26. The opening theme is "Jiuzai Shengbian" (就在身边, "By Your Side") by Peng Zhenxian, and the ending theme is "Biekan Wo Zhi Shi Yizhi Yang" by Ivy Koo.

The twenty-third season Dunk for Victories (筐出胜利, "Win within the Basket") is the first season of the Yudong Yingxiong Zhuan (运动英雄传, "Sports Heroes") series. This season began broadcasting on Aniworld Satellite Television, Youku, iQiyi, Tencent Video, Mango TV on January 22, 2021, and finished on February 5. The opening theme is "Xiwang Zhi Lan" (希望之篮, "The Basket of Hope") by Yi Qi, and the ending theme is "Biekan Wo Zhi Shi Yizhi Yang" by Ivy Koo.

The twenty-fourth season Ultimate Battle: The Next Generation (决战次时代, "Decisive Battle Times") is the fourth season of the Mighty Little Defenders series. This season premiered on Aniworld Satellite Television, Youku, Mango TV on July 9, 2021, and finished on July 23. The opening theme is "Chuangzao Weilai" (创造未来, "Create the Future") by Xie Lin, and the ending theme is "Biekan Wo Zhi Shi Yizhi Yang" by Ivy Koo.

The twenty-fifth season The Great Rescue (奇妙大营救, "Wonderful Great Rescue") is the fifth season of the Mighty Little Defenders series and the second series of the Against the Dark Force series. This season premiered on Aniworld Satellite Television, Youku, iQiyi, Tencent Video, and Mango TV on July 15, 2022, and finished on July 29. The opening theme is "Yueding" (约定, "Promise") by Xie Lin, and the ending theme is "Biekan Wo Zhi Shi Yizhi Yang" by Ivy Koo.

The twenty-sixth season The Season Towns (勇闯四季城, "Enter the Four Seasons City Bravely") is the sixth season of the Mighty Little Defenders series. This season premiered on Aniworld Satellite Television, Youku, and Mango TV on January 6, 2023, and finished on January 20. The opening theme is "Yongzhe Zhi Lu" (勇者之路, "The Hero's Road") by Cai Wen Hao, and the ending theme is "Biekan Wo Zhi Shi Yizhi Yang" by Ivy Koo.

The twenty-seventh season Mysterious Ocean Adventure (遨游神秘洋) is the seventh season of the Mighty Little Defenders series. This season premiered on Aniworld Satellite Television, Youku, iQiyi, Tencent Video, and Mango TV on July 6, 2023, and finished on July 20.

The twenty-eighth season Explore Wolffy's Mind (心世界奇遇) is the eighth season of the Mighty Little Defenders series. This season premiered on Aniworld Satellite Television, Youku, iQiyi, Tencent Video, and Mango TV on January 19, 2024, and finished on February 2.

The twenty-ninth season Crazy Hubs (疯狂超能营) is the ninth season of the Mighty Little Defenders series. This season premiered on Aniworld Satellite Television, Youku, iQiyi, Tencent Video, and Mango TV on July 5, 2024, and finished on July 19.

The thirtieth season Martial World Rescue (奇侠大营救) is the tenth season of the Mighty Little Defenders series. This season premiered on Aniworld Satellite Television, Youku, iQiyi, Tencent Video, and Mango TV on January 10, 2025, and finished on January 24.

The thirty-first season New Wild Cosmos (狂野新宇宙) is the eleventh season of the Mighty Little Defenders series. This season premiered on Aniworld Satellite Television, Youku, iQiyi, Tencent Video, and Mango TV on July 4, 2025, and finished on July 18.

== Web animations ==
The series is also made into web animations. The first season of the web series is titled Around the World in 20 Days (喜羊羊游世博, "Weslie Travels Around the World Expo"), and premiered on BesTV IPTV Platform on August 1, 2010. This season contains 20 episodes.

The second web animation titled Everyday Pleasant Goat (洋洋得意喜羊羊, "Triumphantly Weslie") premiered on eSurfing iCartoons and includes 365 episodes.

The third related web animation is titled Man Jing Tou (漫镜头, "Slow Motion" or "Comic Shot") and owns 60 episodes. It premiered on November 24, 2016, and on many Chinese video websites including Iqiyi, Sohu Video, Kumi and PPTV. Both the opening and the ending themes of this season are "Biekan Wo Zhi Shi Yizhi Yang" by Ivy Koo.

The series also has three independent subseries of web animations: Pleasant Goat Fun Class (智趣羊学堂) (including six seasons: Animals & Plants (智趣羊学堂之动植物篇, "The Chapter of Animals & Plants") and Sports Are Fun (智趣羊学堂之运动篇, "The Chapter of Sports") in July 2016, Mr. Wolffy, Mr. Right! (嫁人就嫁灰太狼, "Marry Wolffy If You Want to Get Married") in February 2017, The Earth Carnival (地球嘉年华) in July 2017, Travel Around the World (羊羊游世界, "Goats Traveling Around the World") in December 2017, Idiom World (奇幻成语书, "Amazing Book of Idioms") and Finding Treasures (羊羊来寻宝, "Goats Finding Treasures") in February 2018, Mighty Goat Squad Series (羊羊趣冒险系列) (including two seasons: Mighty Goat Squad (羊羊趣冒险), "Goats Go to Adventures") in August 2020 and Mighty Goat Squad 2 (羊羊趣冒险2, "Goats Go to Adventures 2") in November 2021.

== Films ==
The series has also made 11 animated feature films and two live-action/animated films: Pleasant Goat and Big Big Wolf - The Super Adventure (喜羊羊与灰太狼之牛气冲天) in 2009, Pleasant Goat and Big Big Wolf – Desert Trek: The Adventure of the Lost Totem (喜羊羊与灰太狼之虎虎生威 or 喜羊羊與灰太狼之虎膽羊威) in 2010, Pleasant Goat and Big Big Wolf – Moon Castle: The Space Adventure (喜羊羊与灰太狼之兔年顶呱呱) in 2011, Pleasant Goat and Big Big Wolf – Mission Incredible: Adventures on the Dragon's Trail (喜羊羊与灰太狼之开心闯龙年) and Pleasant Goat and Big Big Wolf - I Love Wolffy (喜羊羊与灰太狼之我爱灰太狼) in 2012, Pleasant Goat and Big Big Wolf – The Mythical Ark: Adventures in Love & Happiness (喜羊羊与灰太狼之喜气羊羊过蛇年) and Pleasant Goat and Big Big Wolf - I Love Wolffy 2 (喜羊羊与灰太狼之我爱灰太狼2) in 2013, Pleasant Goat and Big Big Wolf – Meet the Pegasus (喜羊羊与灰太狼之飞马奇遇记) in 2014, Pleasant Goat and Big Big Wolf – Amazing Pleasant Goat (喜羊羊与灰太狼之羊年喜羊羊), Pleasant Goat and Big Big Wolf: Dunk for Future (喜羊羊与灰太狼大电影：筐出未来) in 2022, Pleasant Goat and Big Big Wolf 3D Movie in 2023, Pleasant Goat and Big Big Wolf: The World Guardians (喜羊羊与灰太狼之守护) in 2024, Pleasant Goat and Big Big Wolf: Bright New Dawn (喜羊羊与灰太狼之异国破晓) in 2025 and Pleasant Goat and Big Big Wolf: Dunk for Future 2 (喜羊羊与灰太狼大电影之筐出未来2) in 2027.

== Plot ==
In the year 3513 of the Sheep Calendar, the sheep tribe was very prosperous on the Green Grassland, and the sheep lived happily here. It was not until Gray Wolf and his wife Red Wolf moved to the forest on the other side that the sheep really saw the wolf recorded in the book in reality. Gray Wolf tried every way to cross the iron fence to catch sheep every day, but he did not expect that his opponent was the smartest sheep in the whole sheep tribe, Pleasant Sheep, and behind Pleasant Sheep were the village chief Slow Sheep, who wi extremely wise and good at inventions, the wise but foolish, greedy and sleepy Lazy Sheep, the powerful and brave Feiyangyang, the kind-hearted and extraordinarily beautiful sheep, and the gentle, lovely and responsible Nuanyangyang. The kind and brave sheep, with wisdom and courage, saw through the conspiracy of Gray Wolf again and again. But Gray Wolf also worked hard for his family and persevered in catching sheep. He failed again and again, but stood up again and again. In this way, the interesting story of wolves catching sheep continued to be staged on the Green Grassland.

== Episodes ==
=== Season 1 ===
No.	Chinese title	English Title
Volume 1
1	狼来了（上）	Wolves Comes Part 1
2	狼来了（下）	Wolves Comes Part 2
3	大小药丸	Big And Small Pills
4	昏睡果	Sleeping Fruit
5	变色狼	Color-changing Wolf
6	克隆喜羊羊	Clone Weslie
7	自爆兵团	Self-booming Force
8	运动会	Sports Meeting
9	迷糊草	Dizzy Grass
10	魔笛	Magical Flute
11	充气飞船	Full-of-gas Flying-ship
12	美丽的方法	Way to Beauty
13	地道战	Battle of the Underground Passage
14	隐形药水	Invisibility Potion
15	我们的校庆活动	Our School Celebration Activity
16	神奇宝盒	The Magical Treasure Box
17	复合鹰狼	A Combination of Eagle and Wolf
18	灰太狼的魔术箱	Wolffy's Magic Box
19	强力磁石	Strong Margets
20	生日贺礼	Birthday Present
21	疯羊菇	Goat-maddening Mushrooms
22	红太狼入侵	Wolnie Invades
23	声控炸弹	Sound Controlling Bomb
24	电力灰太狼	Electric Wolffy
25	骑士沸羊羊	Sparky the Knight
26	狼叔来了	Wolf's Uncle Comes
27	美容顾问	Beauty Consultant
28	谈判陷阱	A Negotiation Trap
29	冰河世纪	Ice Age
30	捕羊武器	Goat-catching Weapons
31	羊博士	Professor Goat
32	超级隐身膏	Super Invisibility Ointment
33	功夫表哥	Kung Fu Cousin
34	蹄印锁和唇印锁	Hoofprint Lock & Lipprint Lock
35	自动照相屋	Automatic Photographing House
36	灰太狼日记	Wolffy's Diary
37	易容水	Disguising Potion
38	升级的战争	The Levelling-up Battle
39	发善心	Be Kind
40	机器战警	Robot Cop
Volume 2
41	狼历新年	The Wolf Calendar New Year
42	灰太狼二世	Wolffy II
43	防狼喷雾	Anti-wolf Spray
44	粘羊胶	Goat-sticking Glue
45	火攻羊村	Firing the Goat Village
46	牧羊犬灰灰	Wolffie the Shepherd Dog
47	天外来客	Aliens
48	喜羊羊的礼物	Weslie's Present
49	变相怪狼	Disguising Strange Wolf
50	自私的懒羊羊	Selfish Paddi
51	呼吸的决战	The Dual of Breathing
52	鸟蛋之争	The Argument on Bird or Egg
53	懒羊羊的歌声	Paddi's Voice
54	羊毛节	Goats' Fur Festival
55	灰太狼之死	The Death of Wolffy
56	蝗虫危机	Locust Crisis
57	邪恶藤蔓	The Evil Vine
58	终级溶解液	The Ultimate Dissolving Liquid
59	地雷战	Battle of Landmines
60	荣誉之战	Battle for the Glory
Volume 3
61	穿缝术	Art of Getting Through Gaps
62	团团转	Spinning Around
63	大力木耳	Powering Wood Ear
64	罐装懒羊羊	Paddi in a Can
65	蜘蛛狼	Spider-Wolf
66	红太狼的狩猎计划	Wolnie's Plan to Hunt
67	跳舞鞋	Dancing Shoes
68	泡泡机	Bubble Machine
69	梦幻牙膏	Fantastic Toothpaste
70	慢羊羊的地动仪	Slowly's Seismograph
71	青青温泉	The Green Green Hot Spring
72	冬季运动会	The Winter Sports Meeting
73	定身摩丝	Immobilizing Mousse
74	细菌大战	The Bacteria Battle
75	夺命狼牙	Deadly Wolf's Fang
76	灰太狼的眼睛瞎了	Wolffy is blind
77	希望煲	Hoping Cooker
78	臭臭弹	Smelly Bomb
79	村长的魔术棒	Village Chief's Magic Stick
80	蜗牛迟缓液	Snail Slowing Liquid
Volume 4
81	月圆之夜	Full-moon Night
82	无线追踪器	Wireless Tracker
83	影子之战（上）	Shadow War Part 1
84	影子之战（下）	Shadow War Part 2
85	斗牛角	Bull horns
86	时光闹钟	Time Alarm Clock
87	明星灰太狼	Star Wolffy
88	青蛙王子	Frog Prince
89	听话蚕豆	Obedient Broad Bean
90	白日梦	Daydream
91	寻宝记	Treasure Finding
92	暴力留声机	Violent phonograph
93	称霸森林	Dominating the Forest
94	杠铃与啄木鸟	Barbell and Woodpecker
95	神奇泡泡	Magic Bubble
96	慢羊羊的奖杯	Slowly's Trophy
97	真假诱饵	True and False Trap
98	狂牛饮料	Cow Drink
99	星月之旅	Moon Journey
100	神奇电视机	Magical Television
101	梦中大战斗	Dream Battle
102	新大小药丸	New Size Pill
103	拔牙攻略	Tooth Extraction Strategy
104	环山自行车赛	Mountain Bike Race
105	森林女声	Forest Girl
106	神奇画箱	Magic Box
107	偷电	Steal Electricity
108	森林奇幻魔术表演	Forest Fantasy Magic Show
109	爆炸纸	Explosion Paper
110	缩水战衣	Shrink Suit
111	瓶中之神	God In A Bottle
112	狼表哥来了	Wolf's Cousin Comes
113	慢羊羊的痴呆症	Slowly's Dementia
114	新亡羊补牢	A New Patch
115	杂耍灰太狼	Wolffy's Juggling
116	充气衣服	Inflatable Clothes
117	核电风波	Nuclear Power Storm
118	忍者灰太狼	Wolffy Ninja
119	致命游戏	Deadly Game
120	踩高跷	Stilts
Volume 5
121	环境保卫战	Environmental Protection Battle
122	拯救灰太狼	Saving Wolffy
123	无敌拳套	Invincible Gloves
124	驱狼电棒	Anti-wolf Electricity Rod
125	衰老劑	Aging Agent
126	快乐薯片	Happy Potato Chips
127	青春的回忆	Memories of Youth
128	遥控天线	Remote Control Antenna
129	大象的生日	Elephant's Birthday
130	合体狼	Combined Wolf
131	螃蟹和狼	Crab and Wolf
132	冬羊節「降魔」	Winter Sheep Festival "Devil"
133	天狼補月	Sirius Menstruation
134	天算不如羊算	Heaven Is Not As Good A Sheep
135	美羊羊的蝴蝶结	Tibbie's Bow Tie
136	魔方锁	Rubik's Cube
137	送禮老羊	Gift Old Sheep
138	新年大桔	New Year Big Orange
139	假牙失蹤記	Missing Dentures
140	狼神传说	Legend of the Wolf God
Volume 6
141	特效化肥	Special Effect Fertilizer
142	液化灰太狼	Liquefaction Wolffy
143	母鸡套装	Hen Set
144	羊假虎威	Sheep Fake Tiger Power
145	呼啦圈	Hula Hoop
146	狼牌丝棉被	Wolf Brand Silk Quilt
147	水源危机	Water Crisis
148	龙卷风	Tornado
149	与狼交易	Trade with Wolves
150	喷射飞行器	Jet Aircraft
151	向着南极前进	Heading to Antarctica
152	雪绒花	Edelweiss
153	夺草奇兵	Raiders of the Grass
154	丢失的记忆	Lost Memory
155	充气油画	Inflatable Oil Painting
156	清洁运动	Cleaning Campaign
157	拳击擂台赛	Boxing Ring
158	追赶太阳	Chase the Sun
159	甲虫堡垒	Beetle Fortress
160	除草专家	Weed Expert
Volume 7
161	红太羊	Red Sheep
162	五彩手环	Five Colorful Bracelet
163	劫机事件	Hijacking Incident
164	流动浴室	Mobile Bathroom
165	给我一颗小星星	Give Me A Little Star
166	纸巾制造机	Tissue Making Machine
167	机械护羊犬	Mechanical Sheep Dog
168	美酒飘香	Fine Wine
169	移动狼堡	Mobile Wolf Castle
170	小秘密	Little Secret
171	灰太狼病了	Wolffy Sick
172	夺钻笨狼	Silly Wolf
173	恶心饼干	Disgusting Cookies
174	蛤蟆国王	Toad King
175	星球大战	Star Wars
176	喇叭花	Morning Glory
177	狼鱼公主	Wolf Fish Princess
178	小拉链	Small Zipper
179	西域刀羊	Western Sword Sheep
180	宠物总动员	Pet Story
181	群狼攻村	Wolves Attack the village
182	群狼再现	The Wolves Reappear
183	打打一叮	Ding Ding Ding
184	灰羊羊与喜太狼	Grey Sheep and Happy Wolf
185	水上乐园	Water Park
186	好朋友	Best Friends
187	捉小偷	Catch Thieves
188	失眠小夜曲	Insomnia Serenade
189	屠羊宝刀	Sheep Butcher Knife
190	漂流记	Drift
191	迷之森林	Mysterious Forest
192	精灵宝石	Elf Gem
193	喜羊羊的烦恼	Weslie Trouble
194	瞭望斜塔	Leaning Tower
195	呱呱叫的灰太狼	Croak Wolffy
196	相反锤	Opposite Hammer
197	棒打灰太狼	Stick Wolffy
198	保护灰太狼	Protect Wolffy
199	高速滑板	High Speed Skateboard
200	暴风小羊	Storm Lamb
201	露营	Camping
202	如意汤婆子	Ruyi Soup Mother
203	意志山	Will Hii
204	甜蜜蜜	Sweet as Honey
205	拳头枪	Fist Gun
206	蕉太狼的真面目	The True Face of Banana Wolf
207	馋嘴大肥虫	Gluttonous Fat Worm
208	画出彩虹	Draw A Rainbow
209	懒羊羊与鼠小弟	Paddi and Little Mouse
210	拯救大鲨利奥	Save the Shark Leo
211	国王回归	Return of the King
212	抓羊娃娃机	Sheep Catching Doll Machine
213	失物追踪器	Lost and Found Tracker
214	小塘鹅遇难记	Little Gannets Died
215	报恩记	Repayment
216	种蕉得蕉	Planting Bananas
217	幻影英雄	Phantom Hero
218	勇敢的懒羊羊	Brave Paddi
219	见习小护士	Trainee Nurse
220	战胜小强	Beat Xiaoqiang
Volume 8
221	青青嘉年华（上）	Youth Carnival (Part 1)
222	青青嘉年华（下）	Youth Carnival (Part 2)
223	地下垃圾场	Underground Dump
224	七色花	Seven Colors Flowers
225	考车牌	License Plate Test
226	摘星之狼	Wolf for the Stars
227	功夫小子	Kung Fu Boy
228	变形记	Metamorphosis
229	代理村长	Acting Village Chief
230	蜕变的虫宝宝	Morphing Baby Bug
231	小个子	Small
232	我爱皮草	I Love Fur
233	沙漠大百科	Desert Encyclopedia
234	海市蜃楼	Mirage
235	狼假虎威	Wolf Fake Tiger
236	羊蹄铁	Sheepshoe
237	石头记	Stones
238	鼾声如虎	Snoring Like a Tiger
239	能吃是福	Eating Is A Blessing
240	恶魔的信	Devil's Letter
241	赛龙舟	Dragon Boat Race
242	钓羊记	Goat Fishing
243	火山游记	Volcano Travels
244	红太狼太太团	Wolnie's Wives
245	力量提升机	Power Lift
246	狼族英雄	Wolf Hero
247	草原三笨侠	The Three Stupid Heroes of the Prairie
248	金耳朵	Golden Ear
249	模范学生	Model Student
250	秘密武器	Secret Weapon
251	时光倒流五百年	Five Hundred Years Back In Time
252	羊村夏令营	Yangcun Summer Camp
253	预言笔记本	Prophecy Notebook
254	思念就像一阵风	Missing Is Like A Gust of Wind
255	拯救村长	Save the Village Chief
256	陶瓷是怎样做成的	How Ceramics Are Made
257	哀伤的萤火虫	Sad Firefly
258	面包树	Breadfruit Tree
259	懒惰灯	Lazy Lamp
260	寄生虫	Parasite
Volume 9
261	私人小窝	Private Nest
262	危险勿动	Dangerous Don't Move
263	诚实云雨	Honesty Cloud Rain
264	开心一枪	Happy Shot
265	慢羊羊纪念馆	Slow Sheep Memorial Hall
266	成长的烦恼	Growing Pains
267	瞬间移动斗篷	Teleport Tent
268	比太阳更光亮	Brighter Than the Sun
269	旅行蚁	Travel Ants
270	反狼精英	Anti-Wolf Elite
271	怪兽来了	The Monster is Coming
272	九色霓裳	Nine Color Neon Clothes
273	冒牌大力神	Fake Hercules
274	我是超人	I Am Superman
275	自信的懒羊羊	Confident Paddi
276	一诺千金	A Promise of Gold
277	青蛙公主	Frog Princess
278	神秘笔友	Mystery Penpal
279	灾难屋	Disaster House
280	优点强化机	Advantage Enhancer
281	古古怪界大作战 第1集 勇闯古古怪界	The Great War in the Weird World Episode 1 Bravely in the Weird World
282	古古怪界大作战 第2集 难听的笑声	The Great War in the Weird World Episode 2 Ugly Laughter
283	古古怪界大作战 第3集 潇洒哥与黑大帅	The Great War in the Weird World Episode 3 The Handsome Brother and Black Handsome
284	古古怪界大作战 第4集 可怕的基因光线	The Great War in the Weird World Episode 4 Scary Gene Rays
285	古古怪界大作战 第5集 看不见的陷阱	The Great War in the Weird World Episode 5 Invisible Trap
286	古古怪界大作战 第6集 阴险的计划	The Great War in the Weird World Episode 6 Insidious Plan
287	古古怪界大作战 第7集 迷失在地图上	The Great War in the Weird World Episode 7 Lost on the map
288	古古怪界大作战 第8集 灰太狼的苦心	The Great War in the Weird World Episode 8 Wolffy's Painstakingly
289	古古怪界大作战 第9集 光明道具	The Great War in the Weird World Episode 9 Bright Props
290	古古怪界大作战 第10集 狼子野心	The Great War in the Weird World Episode 10 Wild Ambition
291	古古怪界大作战 第11集 光明道具真的很光明	The Great War in the Weird World Episode 11 Bright Props are Really Bright
292	古古怪界大作战 第12集 追赶黑大帅	The Great War in the Weird World Episode 12 Chasing Black Handsome
293	古古怪界大作战 第13集 惹是生非的家伙	The Great War in the Weird World Episode 13 Troublemaker
294	古古怪界大作战 第14集 巨蛙国	The Great War in the Weird World Episode 14 Giant Frog Country
295	古古怪界大作战 第15集 好大的一场雨	The Great War in the Weird World Episode 15 A Big Rain
296	古古怪界大作战 第16集 计划不如变化	The Great War in the Weird World Episode 16 Plans Are Worse The Change
297	古古怪界大作战 第17集 为石头疯狂	The Great War in the Weird World Episode 17 Crazy For Stones
298	古古怪界大作战 第18集 螃蟹军团	The Great War in the Weird World Episode 18 Crab Legion
299	古古怪界大作战 第19集 难以完成的任务	The Great War in the Weird World Episode 19 Difficult Task
300	古古怪界大作战 第20集 众志成城	The Great War in the Weird World Episode 20 Unity
301	古古怪界大作战 第21集 邪恶的祭坛	The Great War in the Weird World Episode 21 Evil Altar
302	古古怪界大作战 第22集 不该忽视的力量	The Great War in the Weird World Episode 22 A force not to be ignored
303	古古怪界大作战 第23集 小羊的反击	The Great War in the Weird World Episode 23 The Lamb's Counterattack
304	古古怪界大作战 第24集 红太狼重返地面	The Great War in the Weird World Episode 24 Wolnie's Return to the Ground
305	古古怪界大作战 第25集 黑大帅末路狂奔	The Great War in the Weird World Episode 25 The Black handsome man runs wild
306	古古怪界大作战 第26集 真假黑大帅	The Great War in the Weird World Episode 26 Real and fake black handsome
307	古古怪界大作战 第27集 吓唬灰太狼	The Great War in the Weird World Episode 27 Frighten wolffy
308	古古怪界大作战 第28集 国师黑大帅	The Great War in the Weird World Episode 28 National teacher Black commander
309	古古怪界大作战 第29集 潇洒哥不见了	The Great War in the Weird World Episode 29 Cool bro is gone
310	古古怪界大作战 第30集 冰川上的来客	The Great War in the Weird World Episode 30 Visitors on the glacier
311	古古怪界大作战 第31集 兔子国历险记	The Great War in the Weird World Episode 31 Rabbit Country Adventures
312	古古怪界大作战 第32集 大历险	The Great War in the Weird World Episode 32 Big Adventure
313	古古怪界大作战 第33集 危机重重	The Great War in the Weird World Episode 33 Crisis
314	古古怪界大作战 第34集 假国王的真面目	The Great War in the Weird World Episode 34 The true face of the false king
315	古古怪界大作战 第35集 越狱未遂	The Great War in the Weird World Episode 35 Attempted escape
316	古古怪界大作战 第36集 跳蚤奇兵	The Great War in the Weird World Episode 36 Flea Raider
317	古古怪界大作战 第37集 智取花洒	The Great War in the Weird World Episode 37 Outsmart the shower
318	古古怪界大作战 第38集 潇洒哥落难	The Great War in the Weird World Episode 38 Handsome brother in trouble
319	古古怪界大作战 第39集 智戏七恶狼	The Great War in the Weird World Episode 39 Wisdom play seven evil wolves
320	古古怪界大作战 第40集 双狼逃离记	The Great War in the Weird World Episode 40 Two wolves escape
Volume 10
321	古古怪界大作战 第41集 羊羊出动！	The Great War in the Weird World Episode 41 Sheep out!
322	古古怪界大作战 第42集 重回地底世界	The Great War in the Weird World Episode 42 Return to the underworld
323	古古怪界大作战 第43集 蔓延的烙印	The Great War in the Weird World Episode 43 Spreading imprint
324	古古怪界大作战 第44集 好心办错事	The Great War in the Weird World Episode 44 Well-intentioned Wrongdoing
325	古古怪界大作战 第45集 谁是内奸	The Great War in the Weird World Episode 45 Who is the traitor
326	古古怪界大作战 第46集 同病相怜	The Great War in the Weird World Episode 46 Pity each other
327	古古怪界大作战 第47集 逃亡记	The Great War in the Weird World Episode 47 Escape
328	古古怪界大作战 第48集 勇救美羊羊	The Great War in the Weird World Episode 48 Save Bravely Tibbie
329	古古怪界大作战 第49集 末路狂奔	The Great War in the Weird World Episode 49 The end of run
330	古古怪界大作战 第50集 危机再现	The Great War in the Weird World Episode 50 Crisis reappears
331	古古怪界大作战 第51集 黑大帅的秘密	The Great War in the Weird World Episode 51 Black handsome secret
332	古古怪界大作战 第52集 破碎的亲情	The Great War in the Weird World Episode 52 Broken love
333	古古怪界大作战 第53集 真假投降	The Great War in the Weird World Episode 53 True and false surrender
334	古古怪界大作战 第54集 双蛋合体	The Great War in the Weird World Episode 54 Double egg fusion
335	古古怪界大作战 第55集 合体大特训	The Great War in the Weird World Episode 55 Great fit training
336	古古怪界大作战 第56集 灰太狼大帅	The Great War in the Weird World Episode 56 Wolffy handsome
337	古古怪界大作战 第57集 懒羊羊的大危机	The Great War in the Weird World Episode 57 Paddi's Big crisis
338	古古怪界大作战 第58集 超级超人	The Great War in the Weird World Episode 58 Super superman
339	古古怪界大作战 第59集 雪白的灰太狼	The Great War in the Weird World Episode 59 Snow White Wolffy
340	古古怪界大作战 第60集 草原上的风波	The Great War in the Weird World Episode 60 Storm on The Prairie
Volume 11
341	专心芯片	Focus on the chip
342	警察故事	Police story
343	灰太狼的预言	Wolffy's prophecy
344	谁是大英雄	Who is the big hero
345	谁动了我的青草	Who moved my grass
346	出气玩偶	Gas doll
347	我的就是我的	What's mine is mine
348	花花草草毛毛	Flowers and grasses
349	统一着装	Uniform
350	凌波仙子	Limbo Fairy
351	预言羊皮卷	Propehcy parchment
352	“月光”小羊	"Moonlight" Lamb
353	打赌	Bet
354	来来羊羊屋	Come got he sheep house
355	出奇“掷”胜	Surprisingly "throw" wins
356	彩云飘飘	Colorful clouds
357	没有什么不可能	Nothing is impossible
358	羊皮大衣	Sheepskin coat
359	寒假作业	Winter vacation homework
360	良师益友	Mentor and friend
361	新年礼物	New Year Present
362	快慢时间钟	Fast time clock
363	厄运胸针	Doom brooch
364	最佳女主角	Best actress
365	灵验狐狸	Efficacious fox
366	同病不相怜	Same sickness
367	痛苦磨练方程式	Painful hone equation
368	羊肉的滋味	The taste of mutton
369	美言果汁	Sweet Juice
370	游戏之王	King of games
371	录音带	Tape
372	护花使者	Messenger of Flowers
373	乖乖小魔怪	Cute little monster
374	义薄云天	Righteous spirit
375	超级助手	Super assistant
376	悠闲假期	Leisure holiday
377	飞上月球	Fly to the moon
378	天才头带	Genius headband
379	头条新闻	Headline news
380	宠宠训练营	Pet training camp
381	灰太狼牌垃圾桶	Wolffy's brand trash can
382	跨越08	Span 08
383	真功夫	Real Kong Fu
384	都是你的错	It was all your fault
385	待到山花烂漫时	Until the flowers bloom
386	健力小羊	Strong lamb
387	至尊懒羊	Supreme lazy sheep
388	逼婚记	Forced marriage
389	我和春天有个约会	I have a date with spring
390	小小报告机	Small report machine
391	铁金刚村长	Iron King Kong Village Chief
392	非常男女	Very male and female
393	公路	Highway
394	告密	Inform / Peach
395	羊寿保险	Sheep Life Insurance
396	代打贴纸	Generation sticker
397	生死时速	Life and death
398	狼质事件	Wolf event
399	温柔一枪	Gentle shot
400	青铜搭档	Bronze partner
Volume 12
401	烟花大汇演	Fireworks Display
402	围巾的诱惑	The Allure of Scarves
403	许愿树	Wishing Tree
404	换牙记	Tooth change
405	都是月亮惹的祸	It's all the moon's fault
406	喷火辣椒	Fire-breathing peppers
407	狂暴之舞	Rampage Dance
408	健美先生	Bodybuilder
409	快乐速递	Happy Express
410	梦醒时分	Waking up
411	灰太狼再婚记	Wolffy's remarriage
412	杂技明星	Acrobatic star
413	小强请你不要来	Xiaoqiang please don't come
414	捕羊公司	Sheep Catching Company
415	IQ零蛋	IQ Zero Egg
416	别逗我笑	Don't make me laugh
417	应聘代课老师	Apply for a substitute teacher
418	幸福时光	Happy time
419	偷袭狼堡	Assault of wolf castle
420	百分百可能	100% possible
421	勤奋围裙	Diligent Apron
422	入狱计划	Jail Plan
423	专业保镖	Professional bodyguard
424	生存大挑战	Survival challenge
425	忠实的歌迷	Loyal fans
426	厨神	God of cooking
427	逃生训练	Escape training
428	借冠军	Borrow the champion
429	我想做个梦	I want to dream
430	德智体药丸	Dezhi Pill
431	聚宝锅	Treasure Pot
432	成长魔镜	Growth Mirror
433	羊村是我家	Goat Village Is My Home
434	军训集中营	Military Training Camp
435	包包大人犯法啦	Master Bao Bao Is Breaking the Law
436	拜干爹	Godfather
437	百变发型	Variety hairstyle
438	最强对手	The strongest opponent
439	变声巧克力	Voice Changer Chocolate
440	笨拙的车手	Clumsy driver
441	三分钟环游世界	Around the world in three minutes
442	爱心小天使	Little love angel
443	火星撞地球	Mars hits Earth
444	两只老羊	Two old sheep
445	可怕的基因	Scary gene
446	生日愿望	Birthday wishes
447	安全门	Safety Door
448	贵宾驾到	VIP arrives
449	心软喷雾剂	Soft heart spray
450	懒羊羊叔叔	Paddi's uncle
451	冒险之王	King of adventure
452	美羊羊的生日	Tibbie's Birthday
453	超级包打听	Super bag to ask
454	卫生大作战	Helath battle
455	流星雨	Meteor shower
456	废物同盟	Waste Alliance
457	和睦草原	Harmony Prairie
458	三打红太狼	Three Dozen Wolnie
459	凶手是谁	Who is the murderer
460	永远好脾气	Always Good-Natured
461	重回迷之森林	Back to the Forest of Mysteries
462	换眼行动	Eye Change
463	包包大人的雕像	Statue of the big man
464	动物软糖	Animal Gummies
465	封口胶	Sealing Glue
466	寻锅记	Looking for a Pot
467	雪狐	Snow Fox
468	体育小明星	Sports star
469	世外草原	World outside the grassland
470	危险人物	Dangerous Person
471	我要当班长	I want to be the class president
472	乌鸦嘴	Crow mouth
473	避暑山庄	Summer resort
474	歌神	Song god
475	黑房子	Black House
476	马桶救地球	The toilet saves the planet
477	大马力吸尘机	High horsepower vacuum cleaner
478	力量石	Power stone
479	谁是村长	Who is the mayor
480	刀羊收徒	Sword and Sheep Accept Apprentices
Volume 13
481	村长管闲事	Village head nosy
482	拯救太阳	Save the sun
483	清洁小精灵	Cleaning elf
484	微型羊村	Miniature sheep village
485	天梯	Ladder
486	互助小组	Mutual aid group
487	钻石岛	Diamond island
488	团结号战舰	USS Unity
489	倒霉的天神	Unlucky god
490	今天我休息	Today I rest
491	纸飞机大战	Paper Plane battle
492	钓羊杆	Goat Rod
493	神奇黑珍珠	Magic Black Pearl
494	香水	Perfume
495	草原奥斯卡	Prairie Oscar
496	我要当爸爸了	I'm going to be a dad
497	重力加速度	Gravitational acceleration
498	天使花环与恶魔藤蔓	Angel Wreath and Demon Vines
499	真饿狼传说（上）	The Legend of the Hungry Wolf (Part 1)
500	真饿狼传说（下）	The Legend of the Hungry Wolf (Part 2)
501	最信赖的朋友	Most trusted friend
502	美食大赛	Food Contest
503	最后的贵族	The last nobility
504	光能冰箱	Light energy refrigerator
505	珍稀大蘑菇	Rare big mushroom
506	有借有还	Borrowed have also
507	王子学艺	Prince Xue Yi
508	声控灰太狼	Voice control Wolffy
509	羊羊特工队	Sheep Secret Service
510	小村长的诞生	Birth of the little village chief
Volume 14
511	小村长反转狼堡	The little village chief reverses the wolf castle
512	称职妈妈	Competent mother
513	好爸爸	Good dad
514	我的爸爸会飞	My Dad can Fly
515	我爱宝宝	I love baby
516	巧手冠军	Handy Champion
517	尴尬的村长	Embarrassed village chief
518	自食其果	Eat your own fruit
519	健身班	Fitness class
520	火星来客	Visitor from Mars
521	讲故事	Tell a story
522	大家来照相	Everyone takes pictures
523	好榜样蛋糕	Good example cake
524	慢羊羊的愉快节日	Slowly's happy holiday
525	神秘大三角1	Mysterious Triangle 1
526	神秘大三角2	Mysterious Triangle 2
527	神秘大三角3	Mysterious Triangle 3
528	神秘大三角4	Mysterious Triangle 4
529	神秘大三角5	Mysterious Triangle 5
530	神秘大三角6	Mysterious Triangle 6

=== Pleasant Goat Sports Game ===
No.	Chinese title	English Title
1	选拔圣火手	Selection of the Holy Flame Bearer
2	圣火传递	Flame Relay
3	开幕典礼	Inauguration Ceremony
4	地下世界来的贵宾	Vips From the Underground World
5	足球赛	Soccer Tournament
6	混入黑羊队	Black Sheep Team
7	魔鬼训练	Devil's Training
8	定向子弹	Targeted Bullets
9	射击比赛	Shooting Competition
10	对决机械羊	Dueling Mechanical Sheep
11	怕水运动员	Fear of Water Athletes
12	完美一跳	Perfect Jump
13	被抛弃的冠军	Abandoned Champion
14	村长也疯狂	Mr. Chief Is Also Crazy
15	外籍兵团	Expatriate Corps
16	试探军情	Test Military Intelligence
17	决赛，出剑吧！	The Final, Let's Go to the Sword!
18	无缘夺冠	No Chance to Win the Championship
19	不一样的角斗	A Different Kind of Jousting
20	苦战盘羊	A Bitter Battle With a Pan Sheep
21	她是盘羊	She Is a Sheep
22	午夜号鸣	Midnight Bugle
23	决战斗角场	Duel in the Corner
24	好心办坏事	Good Intentions Do Bad Things
25	失去信心	Losing Faith
26	狼口脱险	Out of the Wolf's Mouth
27	一场没有观众的决赛	A Final Game Without an Audience
28	嫉妒的羚羊公主	The Jealous Antelope Princess
29	乌盆洗手	Washing Hands in a Pot
30	勇救红太狼	Saving Wolnie
31	体操王子	Prince of Gymnastics
32	哥哥你在哪	Where Are You, Brother?
33	亢奋胡萝卜	Hyperactive Carrot
34	胜者为王	Winner Is King
35	金球拍	Golden Racket
36	真冠军	True Champion
37	喜羊羊带伤夺冠	Weslie Wins the Championship With Injury
38	灰太狼裁判	Wolffy Referee
39	盘羊的请求	Argali's Request
40	暖羊羊的抉择	Jonie's Choice
41	族长的一天	Patriarch's Day
42	族长失窃案	Patriarch's Theft Case
43	麻烦的族长	The Troubled Patriarch
44	南瓜饼金牌	Pumpkin Pie Gold Medal
45	真假族长	The Real Patriarch
46	我才是族长	I Am the Patriarch
47	丛林追捕	The Jungle Chase
48	给诚实者的金牌	The Gold Medal for the Honest
49	众狼出击	The Wolves Strike
50	烈火焚原	Burning Fire
51	逃出金刚罩	Escape From the Vajra
52	身陷裂谷	Trapped in the Rift Valley
53	水漫大峡谷	Flooding the Grand Canyon
54	向世外草原进军	Marching to the World Wide Grassland
55	铁人三项赛	Iron Man Triathlon
56	再见机械羊	Goodbye Mechanical Sheep
57	怒攻狼堡	Wolf Fortress
58	绝地大反击	The Great Comeback
59	最后一块金牌	The Last Gold Medal
60	族长的加冕	Coronation of the Patriarch

=== Around the World in 20 Days ===
No.	Chinese title	English title
1	中国馆	China Pavilion
2	印度馆	India Pavilion
3	以色列馆	Israel Pavilion
4	泰国馆	Thailand Pavilion
5	新加坡馆	Singapore pavilion
6	新西兰馆	New Zealand Pavilion
7	澳大利亚馆	Australia Pavilion
8	芬兰馆	Finland Pavilion
9	瑞典馆	Sweden Pavilion
10	瑞士馆	Switzerland Pavilion
11	比利时馆	Belgium-EU Pavilion
12	奥地利馆	Austria Pavilion
13	波兰馆	Poland Pavilion
14	德国馆	Germany Pavilion
15	卢森堡馆	Luxembourg Pavilion
16	意大利馆	Italy Pavilion
17	英国馆	UK Pavilion
18	美国馆	USA Pavilion
19	俄罗斯馆	Russia Pavilion
20	法国馆	France Pavilion

=== Joys of Seasons ===
No.	Chinese title	English Title
1	快乐时光	Happy Time
2	先知的梦	The Dream of the Prophet
3	火星奇花	Strange Flower from Mars
4	真假炸弹	The True or Fake Bomb
5	豪华喷水池	The Luxurious Water Fountain
6	三个救火的少年	The Three Boys Who Saved the Fire
7	祸从口入	Trouble by Mouth
8	忆苦思甜	Bittersweet Memory
9	不老泉	The Fountain of Youth
10	最佳拍档	The Best Partner in Town
11	懒羊羊自救行动	Paddi's Self Rescue
12	梦游记	Sleepwalk Time
13	射日英雄	Shooting Hero
14	神仙草	Immortal Grass
15	玩具总动员	Toy Story
16	小小发明家	Enter the Little Inventor
17	绅士与流氓	Gentlemen vs Loafer
18	谁也不许动	No one is Allowed to Move
19	废品收藏家	Welcome to Trash Collector
20	漫画青青草原	The Grassy Fields in Comic Books
21	天狼食月	The Tengu Eclipse
22	旅行保镖	Travel Bodyguard
23	温柔袖套	The Gentle Cuffs
24	猪一样的队友	Pig-like Teammate
25	蜜蜂大盗	Bee Thief
26	恩将仇报	Good Deeds Goes Unpunished
27	灰太狼的呼唤	The Call of Wolffy
28	神奇照相机	Amazing Camera
29	我叫壮羊羊	I'm Strong Goat
30	女生战争	Girls' Fight
31	忘忧草与勿忘我	Forgetful Grass Remember Me
32	草原怪圈	Strange Drawings on the Field
33	空心地球	It's the Hollow Earth
34	小羊补天	Goats are Fixing the Sky
35	喜羊羊的宝贝	Weslie's Secret Treasure
36	真实的谎言	A Most Honest Lie
37	幸运罐头（一）	The Lucky Can (Part 1)
38	幸运罐头（二）	The Lucky Can (Part 2)
39	幸运罐头（三）	The Lucky Can (Part 3)
40	幸运罐头（四）	The Lucky Can (Part 4)
41	恶作剧粉末	The Special Pranks Powder
42	纵横四海	Crossing the Four Seas
43	开心粮仓	Happy Pantry
44	溜冰王子	The Ice Skating Prince
45	千里送雪花	Sending Snow from a Far Distance
46	冬眠的狼	The Wolf that Hibernates
47	防寒外衣	Cold Prevention Coat
48	相同的雪花	Similar Snowflake
49	特级裁缝	Special Sewing
50	冬天里的一把火	Winter's Single Flame
51	在雪地里画画吧	Drawing on the Snow Ground
52	喜气洋洋过大年（一）——腊八粥	52 "Porridge with Nuts and Dry Fruits — Delicious
53	喜气洋洋过大年（二）——灶君赐福	Pleasant Goat New Years Series (Two) — Blessing of the Kitchen God
54	喜气洋洋过大年（三）——爆竹声声	Pleasant Goat Joy of Seasons — The Sound of the Firecracker
55	喜气洋洋过大年（四）——开门大吉	Happy Chinese New Year (Four) — Good Luck Opening the Door
56	喜气洋洋过大年（五）——恭喜发财	Happy Chinese New Year (Five) — Kung Hei Fat Choi
57	喜气洋洋过大年（六）——步步高升	Happy Chinese New Year (Six) — Promoted Step by Step
58	喜气洋洋过大年（七）——狮王争霸	Happy Chinese New Year (Seven) — Lion Dance Competition
59	喜气洋洋过大年（八）——闹元宵	Happy Chinese New Year (Eight) — Lantern Festival Celebrations
60	天灾狼祸	Unnatural Disaster
61	沉睡森林	The Sleeping Forest
62	古井奇谈	Scary Story of the Old Well
63	集邮故事	The Stamp Collecting Story
64	懒惰香水	Paddi's Perfume
65	慢羊羊方舟	Enter Slowly's Ark
66	热血拉拉队	The Hot Cheerleaders
67	蜡笔与橡皮檫	Crayon and Eraser
68	知心好友	Good Friends
69	时间刚刚好	Absolute Perfect Timing
70	山妖来了	The Mountain Ghost is Here
71	睡出新纪录	A New Sleeping Record
72	桃源仙境	Peach Garden Fairyland
73	铁齿铜牙灰太狼	Metal Teeth Wolffy
74	完美狼生	Perfect Wolffy
75	我们都是美羊羊	All of Us Are Tibbie
76	小心点再小心点	Be Careful, Be Extra Careful
77	悠闲齿轮	The Leisurely Gear
78	会动的画	A Moving Picture
79	欢乐家庭	Happy Family
80	眼泪花	Tear Flower
81	避考大作战	Escape Plan
82	诚实的烦恼	The Trouble with Being Honest
83	代做摇杆	Remote Control
84	父亲节的礼物	The Father's Day Present
85	好爸爸不易做	It's Hard to Be a Good Father
86	今天我倒霉	I Am So Unlucky Today
87	狼王争霸	Wolf Battle
88	狼王再争霸	Wolf King Battle Again
89	慢羊羊的水壶	Slowly's Water Bottle
90	梦想糖果屋	Candy House Fantasy
91	明星不易造	Not Easy to Be a Celebrity
92	男子汉勋章	Courageous Boy Badge
93	生日快乐	Happy Birthday
94	试大胆	Testing The Nerve
95	我是谁	Who Am I?
96	想要生病不容易	It's Not Easy Being Sick
97	羊有羊性	Goats Have Goat Heart
98	真的英雄	True Hero
99	装病风波	Faking Sickness
100	最佳宠物	The Best Pet

=== Smart Dodging ===
No.	Chinese title	English Title
1	可怕的眼疾	Terrible eye disease
2	金色蘑菇	Golden mushroom
3	竞选草原长	Run for prairie chief
4	泰哥求爱记	Thai brother courtship
5	明月伴我心	The moon is with my heart
6	换身记	Body change
7	神奇的帽子	Magic hat
8	望子成狼	Hope the child becomes a wolf
9	教狼从善	Teach the wolf to be kind
10	慢羊羊返老还童	Slow sheep and sheep rejuvenate
11	一起去放风筝	Go fly a kite together
12	我不是乌鸦嘴	I'm not a Crow mouth
13	乾坤转移贴纸	Qiankun Transfer Sticker
14	小画家	Junior Painter
15	夜半呼噜	Snoring in the middle of the night
16	先苦后甜	Bitter and sweet
17	最佳演员奖	Best actor award
18	酸雨机	Acid rain machine
19	游乐场一日游	Playground day trip
20	今夜星光灿烂	Starry night
21	安全卫士	Safety guard
22	梦幻茶叶千里香	Dream tea thyme
23	一起来玩翘翘板	Let's play seesaw together
24	力量与勇气	Strength and courage
25	海螺声声	Sound of conch
26	不要和陌生人说话	Don't talk to strangers
27	定时器	Timer
28	新超羊传奇	New super sheep legend
29	三狼教子	Three wolves godson
30	隐形羔羊	Invisible Lamb
31	有声胜无声（上）	Sound is better than silent (Part 1)
32	有声胜无声（下）	Sound is better than silent (Part 2)
33	假羊也是羊	Fake sheep are sheep
34	挑战厨神	Challenge the chef
35	友谊之伞	Umbrella of Friendship
36	失忆症	Amnesia
37	古古怪界乱斗篇第1集	Ancient and Weird World Brawl Episode 1
38	古古怪界乱斗篇第2集	Ancient and Weird World Brawl Episode 2
39	古古怪界乱斗篇第3集	Ancient and Weird World Brawl Episode 3
40	古古怪界乱斗篇第4集	Ancient and Weird World Brawl Episode 4
41	古古怪界乱斗篇第5集	Ancient and Weird World Brawl Episode 5
42	古古怪界乱斗篇第6集	Ancient and Weird World Brawl Episode 6
43	古古怪界乱斗篇第7集	Ancient and Weird World Brawl Episode 7
44	古古怪界乱斗篇第8集	Ancient and Weird World Brawl Episode 8
45	麻果子	Hemp fruit
46	临时爸爸	Temporary dad
47	我爱雀斑	I love freckles
48	树蛙危机	Tree frog crisis
49	战胜灰太狼	Beat the wolffy
50	真假演唱会	Real and fake concert
51	地震大预警	Earthquake Warning
52	小小生活委员	Small life committee
53	深海寻宝第1集	Deep Sea Treasure Hunt Episode 1
54	深海寻宝第2集	Deep Sea Treasure Hunt Episode 2
55	深海寻宝第3集	Deep Sea Treasure Hunt Episode 3
56	深海寻宝第4集	Deep Sea Treasure Hunt Episode 4
57	深海寻宝第5集	Deep Sea Treasure Hunt Episode 5
58	深海寻宝第6集	Deep Sea Treasure Hunt Episode 6
59	深海寻宝第7集	Deep Sea Treasure Hunt Episode 7
60	深海寻宝第8集	Deep Sea Treasure Hunt Episode 8

=== Happy, Happy, Bang! Bang! ===
No.	Chinese title	English Title
懒羊羊外传		Paddi's Side Story
1	苹果树下的奇遇	Adventures under the Apple Tree
2	出口成真	Words Come True
3	双生花	Twin Flowers
4	偷懒的后果	Result of Being Lazy
5	助人为乐	Helping Others for Happiness
6	好朋友	Good Friends
7	负荆请罪	Humble Apology
8	大闹天宫	Havoc in Heaven
9	请客容易送客难	Inviting Someone Is Easy While Driving Him Away Is Difficult
10	告别狼堡	Goodbye to Wolves' Castle
11	有苦难言	Unsayable Bitter
12	我病了，我没病	I'm Ill, I'm Not Ill
13	会发光的玫瑰花	Rose That Lights
14	最勤快的羊	The Most Diligent Goat
15	拯救灰太狼	Saving Wolffy
16	无敌笑笑粉	Matchless Laughing Powder
17	争锋苹果树（一）	Battle on the Apple Tree (One)
18	争锋苹果树（二）	Battle on the Apple Tree (Two)
19	失去苹果树	Losing the Apple Tree
20	灰太狼的幸福生活	Wolffy's Happy Life
21	没嘴巴的灰太狼	Wolffy Without a Mouth
22	慢羊羊大显神威	Slowly Struts His Stuff
23	魔镜魔镜我爱你	Magic Mirror, Magic Mirror, I Love You
24	吃羊手册	Goat Eating Instructions
25	水果大战灰太狼	Fruits vs Wolffy
小灰灰上学记		Wilie Enters School
26	成狼礼	Coming-of-age Ceremony
27	妈妈的好朋友	Mom's Good Friend
28	儿子被开除了	Our Son Is Kicked Out
29	羊村入学记	Schooling in the Goat Village
30	入学危机	Schooling Crisis
31	安检机	Security Inspection Machine
32	联谊会	Sodality
33	一日小老师	Little Teacher for a Day
34	真假小灰灰（上）	Genuine and Fake Wilies (Part 1)
35	真假小灰灰（下）	Genuine and Fake Wilies (Part 2)
36	历史课上的奇遇	Adventures in History Class
37	求你吃掉我吧	Beg You to Eat Me Up, Please
38	盗羊空间	Ingoation
39	羊羊马拉松	Goats' Marathon
40	勇敢者的游戏	Braves' Game
41	宝石的诱惑	Temptation of Jewel
42	拯救小灰灰	Saving Wilie
43	儿子，你不是羊	You're Not a Goat, My Son
44	羊羊体检记	Goats' Physical Examination
45	谁动了我的米果	Who Moved My Rice Cracker
46	谁不想长大	Who Doesn't Wanna Grow Up
47	最爱的香味	Favorite Aroma
48	有狼出没	A Wolf Haunts
49	家教对决	Tutors' Duel
50	考前父袭	Father's Sneak Attack Before the Exam
51	绝世好狼（上）	Unique Kind Wolf (Part 1)
52	绝世好狼（下）	Unique Kind Wolf (Part 2)
53	都是好朋友	We're All Good Friends
54	考试帽	Exam Beret
55	大肥羊我会回来的	I'll Come Back, Big Fat Goat
其他剧集		Other Episodes
56	疯狂歌迷会	Fans Crazy Concert
57	西瓜成熟的季节	Season When Watermelons Ripens
58	刀羊的求助①	Dao Yang's SOS ①
59	刀羊的求助②	Dao Yang's SOS ②
60	刀羊的求助③	Dao Yang's SOS ③
61	规律公鸡	Disciplinary Rooster
62	听话印章	Tractability Seal
63	灯笼点点	Lanterns Light
64	双羊争美	Two sheep compete for beauty
65	蛋糕复仇记	Cake Revenge
66	期末小红花	End of term safflower
67	爸爸好威风	Dad is so majestic
68	动物扭蛋机	Animal gashapon machine
69	你一定要回来啊，灰太狼（上）	Please Do Come Back, Wolffy (Part 1)
70	你一定要回来啊，灰太狼（下）	Please Do Come Back, Wolffy (Part 2)
71	快乐的水源（上）	Happy Source of Water (Part 1)
72	快乐的水源（下）	Happy Source of Water (Part 2)
73	借花献狼	Borrowing Flowers to the Wolf
74	找妈妈	Looking For the Mom
75	和平的一天	A Peaceful Day
76	老海龟的心愿	Old Tortoise's Wish
77	一起来健忘	Let's Forget
78	争当女主角	Strive To Be The Heroine
79	旋风砣螺	Whirlwind Top
80	灰太狼请客	Wolffy's Treat
81	自主垃圾桶	Autonomous trash can
82	我也要得奖	I Also Want a Prize
83	神奇运动鞋	Magic Sneakers
84	爱吃的意义	The Meaning of Love
85	花羊羊音乐盒	Stacy Music Box
86	汤圆情谊	Feelings Conveyed by Tangyuan
87	聪明果	Smart Fruit
88	不是厄运胸针	Not a Doom Brooch
89	狼堡大夺帽	Great Hat Robbing in the Wolves Castle
90	轻飘飘相机	Fluttering camera
91	奇幻头饰（一）	Fantasy Headwear (One)
92	奇幻头饰（二）	Fantasy Headwear (Two)
93	奇幻头饰（三）	Fantasy Headwear (Three)
94	守信石	Trust Stone
95	我知道你的秘密	I Know Your Secret
96	熊猫大侠	Panda Hero
97	眼见不为实	Seeing Is Not Believing
98	追风勇士	Wind Chasing Brave
99	捉羊矛与防狼盾	Sheep Catching Spear and Wolf Shield
100	小飞羊与大飞狼	Little Flying Goat and Large Flying Wolf

=== The Athletic Carousel ===
No.	Chinese title	English title	Original air date
1	英明的族长	Wise Patriarch	June 30, 2012
2	美食大会	Food Conference	June 30, 2012
3	金杯雪糕	Gold Cup Ice Cream	June 30, 2012
4	奔驰的木马	Mercedes Benz Horse	June 30, 2012
5	沙漠赛舟（上）	Desert Regatta (Part 1)	June 30, 2012
6	沙漠赛舟（下）	Desert Regatta (Part 2)	June 30, 2012
7	花式跳伞（上）	Skydiving (Part 1)	June 30, 2012
8	花式跳伞（下）	Skydiving (Part 2)	June 30, 2012
9	超级替补（上）	Super Substitute (Part 1)	June 30, 2012
10	超级替补（下）	Super Substitute (Part 2)	June 30, 2012
11	冠军的风采	The style of the champion	June 30, 2012
12	情感泡泡	Emotional Bubble	June 30, 2012
13	淘气到狼堡	Naughty to Wolf Castle	June 30, 2012
14	蓝天下的小画家	Little Painter Under the Blue Sky	June 30, 2012
15	豆腐开花	Tofu Blossom	June 30, 2012
16	完美雕像	Perfect Statue	July 1, 2012
17	我好怕怕	I'm so scared	July 1, 2012
18	我心怕怕	I'm afraid	July 1, 2012
19	勇攀高峰	Climb the peak	July 1, 2012
20	追星星	Chasing the stars	July 1, 2012
21	大侦探 01	Detective 01	July 1, 2012
22	大侦探 02	Detective 02	July 1, 2012
23	大侦探 03	Detective 03	July 1, 2012
24	大侦探 04	Detective 04	July 1, 2012
25	大侦探 05	Detective 05	July 1, 2012
26	魔术陷阱	Magic Trap	July 1, 2012
27	宝盆争夺战	Treasure pot battle	July 1, 2012
28	慢羊羊的烦恼	Slowly's Worry	July 1, 2012
29	说了也没羊信	I have no letter	July 1, 2012
30	棋逢敌手	Match Match	July 1, 2012
31	云海冲浪	Sea of Clouds Surfing	July 2, 2012
32	等着你回来	Waiting for you return	July 2, 2012
33	飞跃彩虹	Leap Over the Rainbow	July 2, 2012
34	美女厨神	Beauty Chef	July 2, 2012
35	小记者	Little Reporter	July 2, 2012
36	心中的羊力车	Yang Liche in my heart	July 2, 2012
37	爱心标兵（上）	Love Pacesetter (Part 1)	July 2, 2012
38	爱心标兵（下）	Love Pacesetter (Part 2)	July 2, 2012
39	今天我生日	Today is my birthday	July 2, 2012
40	追风筝	Run a Kite	July 2, 2012
41	最佳建筑队	Best Construction Team	July 2, 2012
42	勇者之争	Battle of the Braves	July 2, 2012
43	今天不吃羊	Don't eat sheep today	July 2, 2012
44	协力马拉松	Collaborative Marathon	July 2, 2012
45	灰太狼的模仿术	Wolffy's Imitation	July 2, 2012
46	暖洋洋的季节	Jolnie's Season	July 3, 2012
47	寻找雪人	Find The Snowman	July 3, 2012
48	烈火燎原	Blaze	July 3, 2012
49	冰雕大赛	Ice Sculpture Competition	July 3, 2012
50	种植能手	Planting expert	July 3, 2012
51	梦飞翔 01	Dream Fly 01	July 3, 2012
52	梦飞翔 02	Dream Fly 02	July 3, 2012
53	梦飞翔 03	Dream Fly 03	July 3, 2012
54	梦飞翔 04	Dream Fly 04	July 3, 2012
55	梦飞翔 05	Dream Fly 05	July 3, 2012
56	最爱捉迷藏	Favorite hide and seek	July 3, 2012
57	草羊借箭	Grass and sheep borrow arrows	July 3, 2012
58	月亮不见了	The moon is gone	July 3, 2012
59	遗失的月亮	Lost moon	July 3, 2012
60	朋友再相约	Friends meet again	July 3, 2012

=== The Happy Diary ===
No.	Chinese title	English title	Original air date
1	虫子别吃我	Bugs Don't Eat Me	December 8, 2012
2	刀羊的秘籍	Sword Sheep's Cheats	December 8, 2012
3	沸羊羊的苦恼	Sparky's distressed	December 8, 2012
4	古堡探秘	Castle Quest	December 8, 2012
5	红太狼失踪记（上）	Wolnie's missing (Part 1)	December 8, 2012
6	红太狼失踪记（下）	Wolnie's missing (Part 2)	December 8, 2012
7	灰太狼的大电影	Wolffy's Big Movie	December 8, 2012
8	慢羊羊的实验室	Slowly's Laboratory	December 8, 2012
9	书中自有糖果屋	The Book Has Its Own Candy House	December 8, 2012
10	威严胡子	Majestic Beard	December 8, 2012
11	表弟到访	Cousin visit	December 8, 2012
12	点点心煮意	Dim sum cooking	December 8, 2012
13	太空一日游	A Day in Space	December 9, 2012
14	严禁超速	Speeding is strictly prohibited	December 9, 2012
15	捉放羊	Catch sheep	December 9, 2012
16	云端之旅	Journey to the Cloud	December 9, 2012
17	最可爱笑容小羊	Cutest Smiling lamb	December 9, 2012
18	红花朵朵	Red flowers	December 9, 2012
19	小灰灰的邀请函	Willie's invitation	December 9, 2012
20	伴我同眠	Sleep with me	December 9, 2012
21	乌云盖顶	Dark cloud cover	December 9, 2012
22	神秘的营救	Mysterious Rescue	December 9, 2012
23	蕉皮纷飞	Banana Peel	December 9, 2012
24	慢羊羊的宝物	Slowly's treasure	December 9, 2012
25	大海的呼唤	Call of the sea	December 15, 2012
26	最懒标兵	The laziest pacesetter	December 15, 2012
27	慢羊羊的手环	Slowly's wristband	December 15, 2012
28	好好学习	Study Well	December 22, 2012
29	小灰灰生病记	Wolie's sick note	December 15, 2012
30	灾民灰太狼	Disaster Victims Wolffy	December 15, 2012
31	一起去看花	Go to see flowers together	December 15, 2012
32	迟到的惩罚	Penalty for being late	December 22, 2012
33	生日小淘气	Birthday Rascal	December 16, 2012
34	迷雾团团转	The fog turns around	December 16, 2012
35	最好的朋友	Best friend	December 16, 2012
36	草原美食家	Prairie Gourmet	December 22, 2012
37	差一点成功	Almost succeeded	December 16, 2012
38	奇异云	Strange Cloud	December 16, 2012
39	送蛋糕	Send Cake	December 16, 2012
40	枕头的烦恼	Pillow troubles	December 22, 2012
41	神奇三侠	Fantastic Three	December 22, 2012
42	捉羊包装	Catching sheep packaging	December 22, 2012
43	羊村里的狼（1）	The wolf in the sheep village (1)	December 23, 2012
44	羊村里的狼（2）	The wolf in the sheep village (2)	December 23, 2012
45	羊村里的狼（3）	The wolf in the sheep village (3)	December 23, 2012
46	羊村里的狼（4）	The wolf in the sheep village (4)	December 23, 2012
47	羊村里的狼（5）	The wolf in the sheep village (5)	December 23, 2012
48	羊村里的狼（6）	The wolf in the sheep village (6)	December 23, 2012
49	读心照相机	Mind reading camera	December 29, 2012
50	月亮升起的时候	When the moon rises	December 29, 2012
51	羊族神杖	Sheep Scepter	December 29, 2012
52	机械美羊羊	Mechanical Tibbie	December 29, 2012
53	我为花狂	I'm crazy about flowers	December 29, 2012
54	认狼作父	Recognize wolf as father	December 29, 2012
55	我要做宝宝	I want to be a baby	December 30, 2012
56	友好的敌人	Friendly Enemy	December 30, 2012
57	我要当英雄	I Want to be a hero	December 30, 2012
58	我要吃肉	I want to eat meat	December 30, 2012
59	断桥风波	Broken bridge storm	December 30, 2012
60	原来在乎你	I care about you	December 30, 2012

=== Happy Formula ===
No.	Chinese title	English Title
1	拆蛋专家	Egg Breaker
2	好朋友要有好名字	Good friends have good names
3	把蛋还给我	Give me back the egg
4	水上小英雄	Water hero
5	先到先得	First come first served
6	小甜甜	Britney
7	我爱排头兵	I love vanguard
8	馋嘴的跑车	Gluttonous sports car
9	完美无敌	Perfect invincible
10	欢乐驾校	Happy driving school
11	救火先锋	Fire fighting pioneer
12	潇洒走一回	Take a walk
13	女王驾到	Queen arrives
14	快乐维修站	Happy repair station
15	我要棒棒糖	I want a lollipop
16	弯道悠悠	Cornering
17	搭错车	Take the wrong car
18	姐妹同心	Sisters
19	请帮我签个名	Please sign me
20	交通规则	Traffic rules
21	能者要多劳	Ability to work harder
22	心中的停车场	Parking lot in mind
23	我心飞跃	My heart leaps
24	随口说不得	Can't say
25	美食大派送	Food Delivery
26	倒霉借车记	Bad luck borrowing a car
27	聪明过了头	Too smart
28	友情分享	Friendly sharing
29	倒着爱	Love upside down
30	小螺帽	Small nut
31	相信村长	Trust the mayor
32	蕉情暖意	Banana love
33	导航卫星	Navigation Satellite
34	挥锅不去	Stick to it
35	爱心绷带	Love bandage
36	棒棒糖的动力	Lollipop Power
37	有备无患	Be prepared
38	明星座驾	Star car
39	小心村长	Be careful of the village chief
40	洗刷刷	Scrub brush
41	怒火战车（上）	Fury Chariot (Part 1)
42	怒火战车（下）	Fury Chariot (Part 2)
43	打坏蛋	Beat the bad guys
44	多多馊主意	So many bad ideas
45	外星能量石	Alien energy stone
46	潇潇洒洒	Chic
47	苹果飘香	Pina Colada
48	灰太狼大道	Wolffy's Avenue
49	花车巡游	Parade
50	绝境逃生	Desperate Escape
51	最高指令（上）	The Highest Order (Part 1)
52	最高指令（下）	The Highest Order (Part 2)
53	公平比赛	Fair play
54	最佳座驾	Best car
55	情谊深深深	Deep friendship
56	妈妈抱抱	Mom hug
57	召唤外星大王	Summon the Alien King
58	代罪羊羔	Scapegoat
59	贵客难送	Difficult to send guests
60	快乐新起点	Happy New beginning

=== Paddi the Amazing Chef ===
No.	Chinese title	English title	Original air date
1	乐滋滋姜饼	Happy Gingerbread	December 20, 2013
2	烘烘香豆腐	Baked fragrant tofu	December 20, 2013
3	酸甜奶酪	Sweet and sour cheese	December 20, 2013
4	五味果冻	Five-flavored jelly	December 20, 2013
5	乐乐甜甜圈	Lele Donuts	December 20, 2013
6	背背馒头	Back buns	December 21, 2013
7	冰渣雪球	Frosty Snowball	December 21, 2013
8	地震薯片	Earthquake Chips	December 22, 2013
9	欢乐七彩糖	Happy Colorful Candy	December 22, 2013
10	脆脆香豆	Crunchy Peas	December 22, 2013
11	笑笑草饼	Laughing Grass Cake	December 22, 2013
12	爆米花开	Popcorn	December 22, 2013
13	缤纷果汁	Colorful Juice	December 22, 2013
14	红红火凤果	Red fire pineapple	December 23, 2013
15	冰糖苦瓜	Rock Sugar Bitter Gourd	December 23, 2013
16	飘飘雪花片	Fluttering Snow Flakes	January 10, 2014
17	强壮巧克力	Strong Chocolate	December 23, 2013
18	昙花烧饼	Epiphyllum biscuits	December 23, 2013
19	爆炸汤圆	Exploding dumplings	December 23, 2013
20	开心月光豆	Happy moonbean	December 24, 2013
21	冰雪薄荷糖	Ice Mints	December 24, 2013
22	脆皮香蕉	Crispy Bananas	December 24, 2013
23	粘粘橡皮糖	Sticky Gummy	December 24, 2013
24	火焰冰梨	Flame Ice Pear	December 24, 2013
25	嘎吱蜂蜜卷	Crunchy Honey Rolls	December 25, 2013
26	弹弹泡泡糖	Bouncing Bubble Gum	December 25, 2013
27	朵朵棉花糖	Blossoming cotton candy	December 25, 2013
28	聪明冰激凌	Smart Ice Cream	December 25, 2013
29	泡泡饼	Bubble Cake	December 25, 2013
30	飞翔紫菜	Flying Seaweed	December 26, 2013
31	汽水喷泉	Soda Fountain	December 26, 2013
32	芝心瓜子	Chime Sunflower Seeds	December 26, 2013
33	香香曲奇饼	Fragrant Cookies	December 26, 2013
34	幸福棒棒冰	Happy Popsicle	December 26, 2013
35	彩虹拉面	Rainbow Ramen	December 27, 2013
36	愿望棒棒糖	Wish Lollipop	December 27, 2013
37	浓情手抓饼	Passionate Hand Pie	December 27, 2013
38	哗啦啦杂果杯	Wow La La Mixed Fruit Cup	December 27, 2013
39	甜甜麦芽糖	Sweet Maltose	December 27, 2013
40	琥珀核桃	Amber Walnut	December 28, 2013
41	飘香榴莲酥	Fragrant Durian Crisp	December 28, 2013
42	香香花生糖	Fragrant Peanut Candy	December 29, 2013
43	羊羊蛋塔	Sheep Egg Tart	December 29, 2013
44	唢呐糕	Suona Cake	December 29, 2013
45	杂果拼薄饼	Mixed Fruit Pancakes	December 30, 2013
46	溜溜青梅饼	Yo Plum Cake	December 30, 2013
47	信心糯米糍	Confidence Nuomi	December 30, 2013
48	想想麻花	Think Twist	December 30, 2013
49	雪花馒头	Snowflake Bun	December 30, 2013
50	妈妈秘呀	Mommy	December 31, 2013
51	蜜蜜豆腐乳	Honey Bean Curd	December 31, 2013
52	相聚豆荚馍	Gathering bean pods	December 31, 2013

=== Dear Little Wish ===
No.	Chinese title	English title	original air date
1	流星驾到	The Meteor Has Come To Town	July 30, 2014
2	村长也有愿望	The Village Chief Has A Wish Too	July 30, 2014
3	我是一只有耐心的羊	I'm A Patient Goat	July 30, 2014
4	和美丽焰火合影	A Photograph With The Beautiful Fireworks	July 30, 2014
5	谁是最美丽的羊	Who Is The Fairest Goat Of All?	July 30, 2014
6	大明星	Superstar	July 31, 2014
7	美好的一天	A Wonderful Day	July 31, 2014
8	英雄小飞机	The Heroic Little Plane	July 31, 2014
9	让包包大人睡个好觉	Let Lord Bao Enjoy A Good Sleep	July 31, 2014
10	狼堡翻修大作战	The Battle Of The Wolf's Refurbished Fortress	July 31, 2014
11	鸡蛋碰石头	The Eggs Against The Rock	August 1, 2014
12	我要当一天弟弟	I Want To Be The Younger Brother For A Day	August 1, 2014
13	重振雄风	Making A Comeback	August 2, 2014
14	神箭手小灰灰	The Legendary Archer, Little Grey Wolf	August 2, 2014
15	我爱香蕉船	I Love Banana Boat	August 3, 2014
16	想学游泳的香太狼	Fragrant Wolf Wants To Learn To Swim	August 3, 2014
17	跨越彩虹	Travel Across The Rainbow	August 3, 2014
18	老虎也是猫	A Tiger Is A Cat Too	August 3, 2014
19	披着羊皮的狼	A Wolf In Disguise	August 3, 2014
20	流星爷爷回家	Grandpa Meteor Is Going Home	August 3, 2014
21	小流星的思念	Little Meteor Is Missing Grandpa	August 4, 2014
22	愿望之城一日游	A Day Trip To The City Of Wishes	August 4, 2014
23	沙漠花海	A Sea Of Flower In The Desert	August 4, 2014
24	远方的笔友	Pen Pal From Afar	August 4, 2014
25	骑鲸记	Riding A Whale	August 4, 2014
26	流星雨	Meteor Rain	August 5, 2014
27	草原之王	King Of The Prairie	August 5, 2014
28	校长的办公桌	The Principal's Desk	August 5, 2014
29	鸡妈妈的幼儿园	Mother Hen's Kindergarten	August 5, 2014
30	名副其实的小乖乖	Little Docile Goat	August 5, 2014
31	盛开在天空的花朵	Flowers That Blossom In The Sky	August 6, 2014
32	宇宙球王	The Soccer King Of The Universe	August 6, 2014
33	永恒的白天	The Eternal Day	August 6, 2014
34	重拾记忆中的礼物	Retrieve The Gift Of Memory	August 6, 2014
35	狼王争夺战	The Battle Of The King Of Wolves	August 6, 2014
36	我的配角生涯	My Life Playing Second Fiddle	August 7, 2014
37	滑雪	Skiing	August 7, 2014
38	月亮摇篮	The Moon Cradle	August 7, 2014
39	萤火虫花环	The Firefly Garland	August 7, 2014
40	神奇的水晶法杖	The Amazing Crystal Staff	August 7, 2014
41	永远美丽的美羊羊	The Eternally Beautiful Pretty Goat	August 8, 2014
42	我的巨型胡萝卜	My Jumbo Carrot	August 8, 2014
43	我要吃素	I Want To Be A Vegetarian	August 9, 2014
44	与偶像同台演出	Joining My Idol On Stage	August 9, 2014
45	空中餐厅	The Restaurant In The Sky	August 10, 2014
46	重回热带丛林	Returning To The Tropical Forest	August 10, 2014
47	秘密	A Secret	August 10, 2014
48	羊村的早餐	Breakfast At The Goat's Village	August 10, 2014
49	云朵三件套	The Three Cloud Pieces	August 10, 2014
50	光源艺术家	The Lighting Artist	August 10, 2014
51	我不唱歌	I Don't Sing	August 11, 2014
52	寻找星妈	Finding Starry's Mother	August 11, 2014
53	补牙	Tooth-Filling	August 11, 2014
54	精彩日记	Exciting Diary	August 11, 2014
55	我要回家	I Want To Go Home	August 11, 2014
56	无尽的智慧	Endless Wisdom	August 12, 2014
57	风的歌唱	The Song Of The Wind	August 12, 2014
58	智能星仔大变身	Smart Starry Upgrade	August 12, 2014
59	狼和羊（上）	The Wolf And The Goat Part 1	August 12, 2014
60	狼和羊（下）	The Wolf And The Goat Part 2	August 12, 2014

=== The Tailor's Closet ===
No.	Chinese title	English Title
1	愿望小衣橱（上）	Wish Wardrobe (Part 1)
2	愿望小衣橱（下）	Wish Wardrobe (Part 2)
3	百变小裁缝（上）	Variety Little Tailor (Part 1)
4	百变小裁缝（下）	Variety Little Tailor (Part 2)
5	吵闹的小工具（上）	Noisy Gadget (Part 1)
6	吵闹的小工具（下）	Noisy Gadget (Part 2)
7	超速跑鞋（上）	Speed Running Shoes (Part 1)
8	超速跑鞋（下）	Speed Running Shoes (Part 2)
9	褪色的小彩虹（上）	Faded Little Rainbow (Part 1)
10	褪色的小彩虹（下）	Faded Little Rainbow (Part 2)
11	变幻口水垫（上）	Changing Saliva Pad (Part 1)
12	变幻口水垫（下）	Changing Saliva Pad (Part 2)
13	旋转灯笼裙（上）	Twirling Lantern Skirt (Part 1)
14	旋转灯笼裙（下）	Twirling Lantern Skirt (Part 2)
15	大镜的烦恼（上）	Mirror Trouble (Part 1)
16	大镜的烦恼（下）	Mirror Trouble (Part 2)
17	百变保护衣（上）	Variety Protecting Clothing (Part 1)
18	百变保护衣（下）	Variety Protecting Clothing (Part 2)
19	飞天斗篷（上）	Flying Cloak (Part 1)
20	飞天斗篷（下）	Flying Cloak (Part 2)
21	刀羊的神奇狼帽（上）	Sword Sheep's Magical Wolf Hat (Part 1)
22	刀羊的神奇狼帽（下）	Sword Sheep's Magical Wolf Hat (Part 2)
23	红太狼香香百合裙（上）	Wolnie's Fragrant Lily Dress (Part 1)
24	红太狼香香百合裙（下）	Wolnie's Fragrant Lily Dress (Part 2)
25	梦幻飞天靴（上）	Dream Flying Boots (Part 1)
26	梦幻飞天靴（下）	Dream Flying Boots (Part 2)
27	神奇记忆芭蕾裤（上）	Magic Memory Ballet Pants (Part 1)
28	神奇记忆芭蕾裤（下）	Magic Memory Ballet Pants (Part 2)
29	华丽羽衣（上）	Gorgeous Feather Coat (Part 1)
30	华丽羽衣（下）	Gorgeous Feather Coat (Part 2)
31	玫瑰花伞（上）	Rose Umbrella (Part 1)
32	玫瑰花伞（下）	Rose Umbrella (Part 2)
33	美梦泡泡枕（上）	Dream Bubble Pillow (Part 1)
34	美梦泡泡枕（下）	Dream Bubble Pillow (Part 2)
35	贴心棉被（上）	Intimate quilt (Part 1)
36	贴心棉被（下）	Intimate quilt (Part 2)
37	故事睡衣（上）	Story Pajamas (Part 1)
38	故事睡衣（下）	Story Pajamas (Part 2)
39	真假书包精灵（上）	True and False School Bag Wizard (Part 1)
40	真假书包精灵（下）	True and False School Bag Wizard (Part 2)
41	顺风耳罩（上）	Downwind earmuffs (Part 1)
42	顺风耳罩（下）	Downwind earmuffs (Part 2)
43	转转牌自动清洗套（上）	Turn card automatic cleaning set (Part 1)
44	转转牌自动清洗套（下）	Turn card automatic cleaning set (Part 2)
45	缤纷时装秀（上）	Colorful Fashion Show (Part 1)
46	缤纷时装秀（下）	Colorful Fashion Show (Part 2(
47	幸运口罩（上）	Lucky Mask (Part 1)
48	幸运口罩（下）	Lucky Mask (Part 2)
49	章鱼围巾（上）	Octopus Scarf (Part 1)
50	章鱼围巾（下）	Octopus Scarf (Part 2)
51	随意眼罩（上）	Random Blindfold (Part 1)
52	随意眼罩（下）	Random Blindfold (Part 2)
53	族长套装（上）	Patriarch Suit (Part 1)
54	族长套装（下）	Patriarch Suit (Part 2)
55	防狼安全服（上）	Anti-wolf safety clothing (Part 1)
56	防狼安全服（下）	Anti-wolf safety clothing (Part 2)
57	小羊指挥衣（上）	Lamb command coat (Part 1)
58	小羊指挥衣（下）	Lamb command coat (Part 2)
59	再见，小衣橱（上）	Goodbye, Little Closet (Part 1)
60	再见，小衣橱（下）	Goodbye, Little Closet (Part 2)

=== Love You Babe ===
No.	Chinese title	English title	Original air date
1	美食基因枪	Delicacy Gene Gun	February 12, 2015
2	妈妈一定要回来	Mom Must Come Back	February 12, 2015
3	记忆蛋糕	Memory Cake	February 12, 2015
4	妈妈比较烦	Mom Is Upset	February 12, 2015
5	儿子的味道	The Taste of Son	February 13, 2015
6	神奇妈妈侠	The Magic Heroine-Mom	February 13, 2015
7	相亲相爱菇	Falling in Love Mushroom	February 13, 2015
8	漫漫回家路	The Endless Way Home	February 13, 2015
9	防狼之心不可无	Be Cautious of Wolves	February 14, 2015
10	月光光心慌慌	Being Worried in the Moonlight	February 14, 2015
11	团聚在羊村	Reunion in the Goat Village	February 14, 2015
12	暖烘烘的心愿	The Wish of Warmth	February 14, 2015
13	送蛋糕的小男孩	A Little Boy Carries Cakes	February 15, 2015
14	我也要吃	I Wanna Eat, Too	February 15, 2015
15	叠叠糕	Piling Cake	February 16, 2015
16	果茶飘香	Smell of Fruit Tea Spreads	February 16, 2015
17	呼噜之夜	The Night of Snore	February 16, 2015
18	灰太狼进村啦	Wolffy Is in the Village!	February 16, 2015
19	苦苦饼	Bitter Cake	February 16, 2015
20	妈妈爱不完（上）	Mama Can't Stop Loving (First)	February 16, 2015
21	妈妈爱不完（下）	Mommy Can't Stop Loving (Last)	February 17, 2015
22	妈妈铃	Mama Bell	February 17, 2015
23	美梦小米糕	Beautiful Dream Little Rice Cake	February 17, 2015
24	送包子	Delivering Buns	February 17, 2015
25	超龄插班生	Overage Interloper	February 17, 2015
26	甜蜜蜜	Sweetness	February 17, 2015
27	回到狼堡	Back to Wolf Fortress	February 18, 2015
28	我的妈呀	Oh My God	February 18, 2015
29	小小食客	Tiny Eater	February 18, 2015
30	隐形斗篷	Invisible Cloak	February 18, 2015
31	游乐日	Playdate	February 18, 2015
32	月下润喉糖	Throat Lozenges Under the Moon	February 18, 2015
33	芝心音符糖	Stuffed Note Candy	February 19, 2015
34	蘑菇姑娘	Mushroom Girl	February 19, 2015
35	记忆丸子	Memory Pills	February 19, 2015
36	最精彩的表演	The Best Show	February 19, 2015
37	我要做好狼	I Want to Be a Good Wolf	February 19, 2015
38	感应母子装	Sensory Mother and Child Costume	February 19, 2015
39	再三回忆	Repeated Memories	February 20, 2015
40	妈妈侠与羊角狼	Mama Man and Goat Horn Wolf	February 20, 2015
41	幸福全家福	Happy Family Photo	February 20, 2015
42	狼形药水	Wolf-Shaped Potion	February 20, 2015
43	最佳家庭	Best Family	February 21, 2015
44	爱的盒饭	Love Box Lunch	February 21, 2015
45	妈妈侠训练班	Mama Man Training Class	February 22, 2015
46	暖羊羊当淑女	Jonie as a Lady	February 22, 2015
47	星星果	Star Fruit	February 23, 2015
48	糊涂妈妈侠	Confused Mama Man	February 23, 2015
49	权威老师	Authoritative Teacher	February 23, 2015
50	妈妈做保姆	Mom as a Nanny	February 23, 2015
51	红太羊博士	Dr. Wolnie Sheep	February 23, 2015
52	永久居民证	Permanent Resident Card	February 23, 2015
53	亲子教育	Parent-Child Education	February 24, 2015
54	狼羊结盟	Wolf and Sheep Alignment	February 24, 2015
55	记忆迷宫	Memory Maze	February 24, 2015
56	狼性难移	Wolf Is Hard to Move	February 24, 2015
57	真爱难忘	True Love Unforgettable	February 24, 2015
58	妈妈侠攻村	Mama Man Attack Village	February 24, 2015
59	草原大变异	Great Grassland Mutation	February 24, 2015
60	还原基因枪	Restore the Gene Gun	February 24, 2015

=== Adventures in the Primitive World ===
No.	Chinese title	English title	Original air date
1	原始青青草原	Primitive Green Green Grassland	August 17, 2015 (Aniworld)
2	原始好兄弟	Primitive Good Brothers	August 17, 2015 (Aniworld)
3	新旧大碰撞	Old and New Collide	August 17, 2015 (Aniworld)
4	笨狼争排名	Stupid Wolves Compete for Ranking	August 17, 2015 (Aniworld)
5	最强盔甲	The Strongest Armor	August 18, 2015 (Aniworld)
6	大象吸尘器	Elephant Vacuum Cleaner	August 18, 2015 (Aniworld)
7	预知未来	Foretelling the Future	August 18, 2015 (Aniworld)
8	羊村不设防	Goat Village Unsuspecting	August 18, 2015 (Aniworld)
9	大笑危机	Big Smile Crisis	August 19, 2015 (Aniworld)
10	大力的接班人	Dali's Successor	August 19, 2015 (Aniworld)
11	百忙一家亲	Hundred Busy Families	August 19, 2015 (Aniworld)
12	荷花的心愿蝶	Lotus’ Wish Butterfly	August 19, 2015 (Aniworld)
13	村长的烦恼	Village Chief's Trouble	August 20, 2015 (Aniworld)
14	大家都是好朋友	Everyone Is a Good Friend	August 20, 2015 (Aniworld)
15	代理队长	Acting Captain	August 20, 2015 (Aniworld)
16	救狼记	Save the Wolf	August 20, 2015 (Aniworld)
17	铃儿响叮当	Jingle Bells	August 22, 2015 (KAKU)
18	手机惹的祸	Trouble Caused by Cell Phone	August 22, 2015 (KAKU)
19	恶狼之首	Head of the Bad Wolf	August 22, 2015 (KAKU)
20	月光宝壶	Moonlight Treasure Pot	August 22, 2015 (KAKU)
21	做自己	Be Yourself	August 22, 2015 (KAKU)
22	做只文明的狼	Be a Civilized Wolf	August 22, 2015 (KAKU)
23	成功石	Success Stone	August 22, 2015 (KAKU)
24	飞向蓝天	Fly to the Blue Sky	August 22, 2015 (KAKU)
25	鸠占鹊巢	Dove to the Magpie's Nest	August 22, 2015 (KAKU)
26	懒羊羊的寻味之旅	Lazy Goat's Taste Hunting Journey	August 22, 2015 (KAKU)
27	伤心小雨	Sad Little Rain	August 23, 2015 (KAKU)
28	上课记	Going to Class	August 23, 2015 (KAKU)
29	食物的烦恼	The Trouble With Food	August 23, 2015 (KAKU)
30	羊大力的溜溜球	Sheep Power's Yo-Yo	August 23, 2015 (KAKU)
31	英雄莫问出处	The Hero Is Not Asking Where He Comes From	August 23, 2015 (KAKU)
32	荷花的飞行梦	Lotus’ Dream Of Flying	August 23, 2015 (KAKU)
33	雕像风波	Statue Controversy	August 23, 2015 (KAKU)
34	方便之门	Door of Convenience	August 23, 2015 (KAKU)
35	剪羊毛	Sheep Shearing	August 23, 2015 (KAKU)
36	企鹅捉羊	Penguin Catching Sheep	August 23, 2015 (KAKU)
37	小角色大作用	Small Role Big Role	August 23, 2015 (KAKU)
38	兄弟胸章	Brother Badge	August 23, 2015 (KAKU)
39	有借有还	Borrow and Return	August 23, 2015 (KAKU)
40	诚实先生	Mr. Honest	August 23, 2015 (KAKU)
41	大力寻亲记	Powerful Family Search	August 23, 2015 (KAKU)
42	功夫小子	Kung FU Kid	August 23, 2015 (KAKU)
43	记忆拼图	Memory Puzzle	August 23, 2015 (KAKU)
44	失声企鹅	Lost Voice Penguin	August 23, 2015 (KAKU)
45	天罗地网	The Net of Heaven and Earth	August 23, 2015 (KAKU)
46	重振狼威	Revive the Wolf	August 23, 2015 (KAKU)
47	大力神美羊羊	Tibbie the Mighty	August 23, 2015 (KAKU)
48	决胜棋盘	Winning Chessboard	August 23, 2015 (KAKU)
49	垃圾与钻石	Trash and Diamonds	August 23, 2015 (KAKU)
50	孪生效应	Twin Effect	August 23, 2015 (KAKU)
51	美羊羊的时尚裙	Tibbie's Fashion Dress	August 23, 2015 (KAKU)
52	消失的胡子	The Disappearing Beard	August 23, 2015 (KAKU)
53	委屈的企鹅	The Aggrieved Penguin	August 29, 2015 (KAKU)
54	将计就计	The Trick Is the Trick	August 29, 2015 (KAKU)
55	会唱歌的椰子	Singing Coconut	August 29, 2015 (KAKU)
56	球衣风波	Jersey Fiasco	August 29, 2015 (KAKU)
57	勇斗恶狼	Fight the Wolf	August 29, 2015 (KAKU)
58	原始时装秀	Original Fashion Show	August 29, 2015 (KAKU)
59	沸羊羊学功夫	Sparky Learn Kung FU	August 29, 2015 (KAKU)
60	重返家园	Return to the Home	August 29, 2015 (KAKU)

=== Marching to the New Wonderland ===
No.	Chinese title	English title	Script	Director	Original air date
1	能量种子	The Energy Seed	Wu Chaowei	Luo Menghao; Cai Yuying	January 15, 2016
2	交换驾驶	Driving Exchange	Shi Jianna	Luo Menghao; Cai Yuying	January 15, 2016
3	大魔王蛛正义	The Devil, Justice Spider	Liu Lifan	Guo Rusen; Guo Si'en	January 15, 2016
4	蚂蚁快递	Ant Express	He Zhusen; Zeng Lingling	Xu Chang	January 15, 2016
5	公主驾到	Her Highness Comes	Liu Feng; Shi Jianna; Wu Chaowei	Luo Menghao; Cai Yuying	January 16, 2016
6	无妄之灾	An Unexpected Disaster	He Zhusen; Liu Lifan; Shi Jianna; Luo Wei(罗玮)	Cai Yuying; Luo Menghao	January 16, 2016
7	后勤大作用	The Importance of Logistics	Liu Wei(刘维); Wu Chaowei; Shi Jianna	Guo Rusen; Guo Si'en	January 16, 2016
8	犹豫不决	Indecisive	Liu Feng; Shi Jianna; Liu Lifan; Luo Wei(罗玮)	He Xiaowei; Huang Xinhui	January 16, 2016
9	艰难抉择	A Difficult Choice	Liu Wei(刘维); Liu Lifan; Guo Minqi	Luo Menghao; Cai Yuying	January 17, 2016
10	暴雨将至	The Approaching Storm	Liu Feng; Liu Lifan; Shi Jianna; Luo Wei(罗玮)	Cai Yuying	January 17, 2016
11	爱车如命	Overprotective	Liu Feng; Liu Lifan; Shi Jianna	He Xiaowei; Huang Xinhui	January 17, 2016
12	勇于担当	Courageously Responsible	Liu Wei(刘维); Liu Lifan; Guo Minqi	Guo Rusen; Guo Si'en	January 17, 2016
13	晕车症	Motion Sickness	Luo Wei(罗玮); Liu Lifan; Shi Jianna	Cai Yuying; Luo Menghao	January 18, 2016
14	总经理受难日	General Manager's Good Friday	Luo Wei(罗玮); Liu Lifan; Shi Jianna	Luo Wei(罗威)	January 18, 2016
15	父子情深	The Father-Son Bond	Liu Wei(刘维); Liu Lifan; Guo Minqi; Zhong Cheng	Wu Yiwei; Gao Ming	January 18, 2016
16	拒绝载客	No More Passengers	Liu Feng; Wu Chaowei; Shi Jianna; Luo Wei(罗玮)	Guo Rusen; Guo Si'en	January 18, 2016
17	留宿大酒店	Staying at the Hotel	Liu Feng; Liu Lifan; Shi Jianna; Liu Wei(刘维)	Luo Zongqi	January 19, 2016
18	天生我才必有用	Born to Be Useful	He Zhusen; Liang Zikai	Luo Wei(罗威)	January 19, 2016
19	神奇蜗壳	The Magical Snail Shell	Wu Chaowei; Liu Feng; Liu Wei(刘维)	Wu Yiwei; Gao Ming	January 19, 2016
20	飞越大瀑布	Soaring Over the Waterfall	He Zhusen; Liu Feng	He Xiaowei; Huang Xinhui; Liang Jiaqi	January 19, 2016
21	救治蛛正义	Rescuing Justice Spider	Zhong Cheng; Liu Lifan; Shi Jianna	Zhong Peng	January 20, 2016
22	不速之客	An Unwanted Guest	Liu Lifan; Guo Minqi; Liu Wei(刘维)	Zhong Peng	January 20, 2016
23	小心驾驶	Careful Driving	Zhong Cheng; Wu Chaowei; Shi Jianna	Luo Zongqi	January 20, 2016
24	恶狼的伎俩	The Evil Wolf's Tricks	Liu Feng; Liu Lifan; Shi Jianna; Liu Wei(刘维)	Cai Yuying; Luo Menghao	January 20, 2016
25	沸羊羊香喷喷	Aromatic Sparky	Liu Lifan; Liu Feng; Huang Weidong	Wu Yiwei; Gao Ming	January 21, 2016
26	小灰灰失踪	Wilie Goes Missing	He Zhusen; Liu Lifan; Shi Jianna; Luo Wei(罗玮)	Wu Yiwei; Gao Ming	January 21, 2016
27	俩老历险记	The Elders' Adventures	Zhong Cheng; Liu Lifan; Guo Minqi	Luo Zongqi	January 21, 2016
28	拯救大树	Saving the Tree World	He Zhusen; Liu Lifan; Shi Jianna; Zhong Cheng	Zhong Peng	January 21, 2016
29	新不如旧	Old Is Better Than New	Liu Feng; Luo Wei(罗玮); Shi Jianna	Wu Yiwei; Gao Ming	January 22, 2016
30	孵蛋记	Hatching the Egg	Liu Lifan; Wu Chaowei; Shi Jianna; Luo Wei(罗玮)	Guo Rusen; Guo Si'en	January 22, 2016
31	都是脏乱惹的祸	Messes Lead to Trouble	Liu Wei(刘维); Liu Lifan; Guo Minqi	Wu Yiwei; Gao Ming	January 22, 2016
32	有借有还	Return What You Borrow	Liu Feng; Liu Lifan; Shi Jianna; Luo Wei(罗玮)	Luo Wei(罗威)	January 22, 2016
33	懒羊羊找水记	Paddi's Search for Water	Liu Wei(刘维); Wu Chaowei; Shi Jianna	Wu Yiwei; Gao Ming	January 23, 2016
34	我们的纪念日	Our Anniversary	Liu Feng; Liu Lifan; Guo Minqi	Wu Yiwei; Gao Ming	January 23, 2016
35	建房子	Home Construction	Liu Lifan	Zhu Zinan; Luo Menghao; He Xiaowei; Huang Xinhui; Cai Yuying	January 23, 2016
36	真正的领队	Our True Team Leader	Liu Feng; Liu Lifan; He Zhusen; Luo Wei(罗玮)	Zhong Peng	January 23, 2016
37	送错的快递	The Misdelivered Parcel	Liu Feng; Liu Lifan; Shi Jianna; Liu Wei(刘维)	Wu Yiwei; Gao Ming	January 24, 2016
38	同宿的烦恼	The Troubles of Sharing Accommodation	Liu Feng; Shi Jianna; Liu Lifan	Zhong Peng	January 24, 2016
39	宝宝保姆	The Baby Sitter	Liu Lifan	Wu Yiwei; Gao Ming	January 24, 2016
40	羊工智能	Artificial Intelligence	Liu Lifan; Shi Jianna; Huang Weidong	Xu Chang	January 24, 2016
41	大雾迷城	Heavy Fog	He Zhusen; He Jialiang	Zhong Peng	January 25, 2016
42	萤火之光	Light of the Fireflies	Liu Wei(刘维); Liu Lifan; Guo Minqi	Zhong Peng	January 25, 2016
43	谁偷了蜂皇浆	Who Stole the Royal Jelly?	Liu Lifan; Shi Jianna; Luo Wei(罗玮)	Wu Yiwei; Gao Ming	January 25, 2016
44	舞出一片天	The Breakthrough Dancer	Shi Jianna	Wu Yiwei; Gao Ming	January 26, 2016
45	现身吧彩虹号	Lift Your Cloak, Rainbow!	Zhong Cheng; Liu Lifan; Shi Jianna	He Xiaowei; Zhu Zinan	January 26, 2016
46	正义的伙伴	Partners in Justice	Zhong Cheng; Liu Lifan; Guo Minqi	Zhong Peng	January 26, 2016
47	矫枉过正	Overkill	Liu Feng; Liu Lifan; Shi Jianna; Zhong Cheng	Luo Wei(罗威)	January 26, 2016
48	滑青苔	Moss Skating	Liu Lifan; Wu Chaowei; Shi Jianna; Luo Wei(罗玮)	Zhong Peng	January 26, 2016
49	宝石鸟巢	The Jeweled Bird's Nest	He Zhusen; Chen Junchen	Zhong Peng	January 26, 2016
50	难舍难分	Inseparable	Liu Feng; Liu Lifan; Shi Jianna; Luo Wei(罗玮)	He Xiaowei; Zhu Zinan	January 27, 2016
51	再见流星雨	Reprise of the Meteor Shower	Liu Feng; Shi Jianna; Liu Lifan; He Zhusen	Luo Wei(罗威)	January 27, 2016
52	正义的交通安全队长	The Rightful Traffic Safety Captain	Luo Wei(罗玮); Wu Chaowei; Shi Jianna	Wu Yiwei; Gao Ming	January 27, 2016
53	礼物	The Gift	He Zhusen; Li Disi	Luo Zongqi	January 27, 2016
54	疯狂的虫草	The Zombie Fungus	Zhong Cheng; Liu Lifan; Shi Jianna	Wu Yiwei; Gao Ming	January 27, 2016
55	极速前进	Full Speed Ahead	Liu Feng; Wu Chaowei; Guo Minqi; Zhong Cheng	He Xiaowei; Zhu Zinan	January 27, 2016
56	知识的力量	The Power of Knowledge	Shi Jianna	Wu Yiwei; Gao Ming	January 28, 2016
57	懒羊羊装病记	Paddi's Fake Illness	Zhong Cheng; Liu Lifan; Guo Minqi	Luo Zongqi	January 28, 2016
58	真假之巅	The True and Fake Summit	Shi Jianna	Xu Chang	January 28, 2016
59	大树崩塌	The Toppling Giant Tree	Liu Lifan	Guo Rusen; Guo Si'en	January 28, 2016
60	嘻哈之旅	A Magical Journey	Shi Jianna	Guo Rusen; Guo Si'en	January 28, 2016

=== The Little Detective ===
No.	Chinese title	English title	Script	Director	Original air date
1	大侦探来了	The Detective Is Here	Liu Lifan	Xu Chang	July 9, 2016
2	小侦探不易当	Little Detective Is Not Easy to Be	He Jialiang	Guo Rusen	July 9, 2016
3	五星办事处	Five-Star Office	Huang Weidong; Shi Jianna; Liu Feng	Huang Xinhui	July 9, 2016
4	真假灰太狼	Real and Fake Wolffy	Liu Wei(刘维)	Xu Chang	July 9, 2016
5	黄鼠狼奇案	The Mysterious Case of the Weasel	He Jialiang	Luo Zongqi; Luo Wei(罗威)	July 9, 2016
6	密室厨房	Secret Kitchen	Liu Lifan	Guo Rusen	July 9, 2016
7	隐形的脚印	Invisible Footprints	He Jialiang	Guo Si'en	July 9, 2016
8	女王的推理	The Queen's Reasoning	Liu Lifan; Liu Feng; Liu Wei(刘维)	Guo Rusen	July 10, 2016
9	最强组合	The Strongest Combination	Lu Yiyong; Shi Jianna	Guo Si'en	July 10, 2016
10	小小侦探	Baby Detective	He Jialiang	Xu Chang	July 10, 2016
11	勇敢的美羊羊	Brave Tibbie	He Jialiang	Xu Chang	July 10, 2016
12	忠厚的牧羊犬	The Faithful Sheepdog	Lu Yiyong; Liu Feng; Liu Lifan	Guo Si'en	July 10, 2016
13	消失的签名	The Disappearing Signature	Liu Wei(刘维)	Luo Zongqi; Luo Wei(罗威)	July 10, 2016
14	最好的礼物	The Best Gift	Liu Wei(刘维)	Guo Si'en	July 10, 2016
15	大力拳套	Powerful Gloves	Liu Lifan	Wu Yiwei; Gao Ming	July 11, 2016
16	失灵的鼻子	Malfunctioning Nose	Luo Wei(罗玮); Liu Feng; He Jialiang	Luo Zongqi; Luo Wei(罗威)	July 11, 2016
17	食物小偷	Food Thief	Chen Junchen; Liu Lifan; Shi Jianna	Wu Yiwei; Gao Ming	July 11, 2016
18	振作啊，灰太狼！	Hang In There, Wolffy!	Li Di'en	Luo Zongqi; Luo Wei(罗威)	July 11, 2016
19	勇破危机	Averting the Crisis	Liang Zikai; Shi Jianna; Liu Feng	Wu Yiwei; Gao Ming	July 11, 2016
20	危险的冰淇淋	Dangerous Ice Cream	Shi Jianna; Liu Feng; Liu Wei(刘维)	Luo Zongqi; Luo Wei(罗威)	July 11, 2016
21	泰哥的樱桃树	Tai GE's Cherry Tree	Liu Lifan	Luo Zongqi; Luo Wei(罗威)	July 11, 2016
22	真正的侦探	A True Detective	Liu Wei(刘维); Shi Jianna; Liu Feng	Gao Ming; Wu Yiwei	July 12, 2016
23	意料之外的凶手	An Unexpected Culprit	Liang Zikai; Li Disi; He Jialiang	Luo Zongqi; Luo Wei(罗威)	July 12, 2016
24	树根谜案	Tree Root Mystery	Luo Wei(罗玮); Liu Lifan; He Jialiang	Wu Yiwei; Gao Ming	July 12, 2016
25	父爱如车	Father's Love Like a Car	Zeng Lingling; Liu Lifan; Liu Feng	Wu Yiwei; Gao Ming	July 12, 2016
26	羊羊侦探团	Goat Detective Team	Liu Feng; Liu Lifan; He Jialiang	Wu Yiwei; Gao Ming	July 12, 2016
27	巨兽之谜	The Mystery of the Giant Beast	He Jialiang	Huang Xinhui	July 12, 2016
28	有害的花草	Harmful Flowers and Plants	Liu Wei(刘维)	Wu Yiwei; Gao Ming	July 12, 2016
29	美食神探	Food Sleuth	He Jialiang	Wu Yiwei; Gao Ming	July 13, 2016
30	头脑与力量	Brain and Power	Liu Lifan; Liu Feng; He Jialiang; Luo Wei(罗玮)	Wu Yiwei; Gao Ming	July 13, 2016
31	铁证疑案	Hard Evidence Mystery	Li Di'en	Luo Zongqi; Luo Wei(罗威)	July 13, 2016
32	妈妈的爱	Mama's Love	Liang Zikai	Wu Yiwei; Gao Ming	July 13, 2016
33	家政侦探暖羊羊	Domestic Detective Jonie	Luo Wei(罗玮); Liu Lifan; He Jialiang	Luo Zongqi; Luo Wei(罗威)	July 13, 2016
34	牧牧的绝技	Murphy's Stunt	Liu Feng; Shi Jianna; Luo Wei(罗玮)	Wu Yiwei; Gao Ming	July 13, 2016
35	谁动了我的玻璃杯	Who Moved My Glass	Liu Wei(刘维)	Luo Zongqi; Luo Wei(罗威)	July 13, 2016
36	潜能无限	Unlimited Potential	Luo Wei(罗玮)	Wu Yiwei; Gao Ming	July 14, 2016
37	真正的盗贼	The Real Thief	Liu Lifan; Lu Yiyong	Wu Yiwei; Gao Ming	July 14, 2016
38	飞来的雕像	Flying Statue	He Jialiang	Wu Yiwei; Gao Ming	July 14, 2016
39	奇怪的线索	Strange Clues	Li Di'en	Xu Chang	July 14, 2016
40	石头证人	Stone Witness	Liu Feng	Wu Yiwei; Gao Ming	July 14, 2016
41	面子问题	The Problem of Face	Liu Feng; Liu Lifan; He Jialiang	Wu Yiwei; Gao Ming	July 14, 2016
42	倒塌的房子	The Collapsing House	Chen Junchen	Huang Xinhui	July 14, 2016
43	帽子神探	The Hat Sleuth	Liu Feng; Shi Jianna; Liu Lifan	Luo Zongqi; Luo Wei(罗威)	July 15, 2016
44	莫名一掌	Inexplicable Slap	Liu Feng; Shi Jianna; Luo Wei(罗玮)	Luo Zongqi; Luo Wei(罗威)	July 15, 2016
45	真心朋友	True Friends	Liu Feng	Wu Yiwei; Gao Ming	July 15, 2016
46	暖心侦探	Warm Hearted Detective	Liu Lifan; Liu Wei(刘维)	Wu Yiwei; Gao Ming	July 15, 2016
47	烦恼的噪音	Troubled Noise	Chen Junchen	Luo Zongqi; Luo Wei(罗威)	July 15, 2016
48	最佳伙伴	Best Buddies	Liang Zikai	Guo Si'en	July 15, 2016
49	裁决手环	Ruling Bracelets	Lu Yiyong; Liu Feng; Liu Lifan	Wu Yiwei; Gao Ming	July 15, 2016
50	消失的钻石	Vanishing Diamonds	Luo Wei(罗玮)	Wu Yiwei; Gao Ming	July 16, 2016
51	反派联盟	League of Villains	Luo Wei(罗玮)	Wu Yiwei; Gao Ming	July 16, 2016
52	我是侦探	I'm a Detective	Luo Wei(罗玮)	Wu Yiwei; Gao Ming	July 16, 2016
53	洗出麻烦	Wash Out Trouble	Luo Wei(罗玮)	Wu Yiwei; Gao Ming	July 16, 2016
54	侦探的假期	Detective's Vacation	Liu Lifan; Liu Feng; Shi Jianna	Guo Rusen	July 16, 2016
55	神探双雄	Detective Double	Liu Lifan; Shi Jianna; Chen Junchen	Luo Zongqi; Luo Wei(罗威)	July 16, 2016
56	食物之祸	The Scourge of Food	Liu Lifan; Shi Jianna; Liu Wei(刘维)	Luo Zongqi; Luo Wei(罗威)	July 16, 2016
57	强敌的挑战	The Challenge of Strong Enemy	Shi Jianna; Liu Wei(刘维)	Xu Chang	July 17, 2016
58	寻找灰太狼	Finding Wolffy	Liu Lifan	Luo Zongqi; Luo Wei(罗威)	July 17, 2016
59	时间都去哪儿了	Where Did All the Time Go?	Li Di'en	Huang Xinhui	July 17, 2016
60	侦探的荣耀	The Glory of Detectives	Li Di'en	Huang Xinhui	July 17, 2016

=== Adventures in the Sea ===
No.	Chinese title	English title	Script	Director	Original air date
1	海洋之星	Ocean Star	Luo Wei(罗玮); Liu Lifan	Cai Yuying; Rong Yuqing	January 9, 2017
2	污染危机	Pollution Crisis	He Jialiang	Cai Yuying; Rong Yuqing	January 9, 2017
3	羊狼魔方	Sheep Wolf Magic Cube	He Jialiang	Cai Yuying; Rong Yuqing	January 9, 2017
4	有买有卖	Buy and Sell	Chen Junchen	Hu Dan; Zhou Fenghua	January 9, 2017
5	爱心马莉	Love Mary	Luo Wei(罗玮)	Huang Xinhui	January 10, 2017
6	救羊记	Sheep Rescue	Liu Wei(刘维)	Lai Zhixuan	January 10, 2017
7	火山餐厅	Volcano Restaurant	Zeng Lingling	Wu Yiwei; Gao Ming	January 10, 2017
8	骗人的石大叔	Cheating Uncle Shi	Liu Wei(刘维)	Guo Si'en; Quan Chao	January 10, 2017
9	修补记	Mending	Liang Zikai	He Xiaowei; He Yingqiang	January 11, 2017
10	海上霸主	Sea Bully	Liu Feng	Lai Zhixuan	January 11, 2017
11	谁惹怒了暖羊羊	Who Pissed off Jonie	Zhong Cheng	He Xiaowei; He Yingqiang	January 11, 2017
12	黑溜溜打工记	Blacky Working	Luo Wei(罗玮)	Lai Zhixuan	January 11, 2017
13	快递危机	Express Crisis	Liu Wei(刘维)	Huang Xinhui	January 12, 2017
14	沸羊羊补牙记	Sparky's Tooth Filling	Luo Wei(罗玮)	Wu Yiwei; Gao Ming	January 12, 2017
15	食人鱼女王	Piranha Queen	Ying Huochong	Guo Si'en; Quan Chao	January 12, 2017
16	贪吃惹的祸	The Trouble With Gluttony	Chen Junchen	He Xiaowei; He Yingqiang	January 12, 2017
17	生日礼物	Birthday Gift	He Jialiang	Cai Yuying; Rong Yuqing	January 13, 2017
18	小海螺大龙卷	Little Conch and Big Tornado	Liu Wei(刘维)	Huang Xinhui	January 13, 2017
19	海怪之谜	The Mystery of the Sea Monster	Zhong Cheng	Lai Zhixuan	January 13, 2017
20	寒冷冰柱	Cold Icicle	He Jialiang	Wu Yiwei; Gao Ming	January 13, 2017
21	懒羊羊的坚持	Paddi's Persistence	Liang Zikai	Zhong Peng	January 14, 2017
22	不一样的宝藏	A Different Kind of Treasure	Liu Feng	Hu Dan; Zhou Fenghua	January 14, 2017
23	碎碎鲨的胸章	Shattered Shark's Badge	Zhong Cheng	Luo Menghao; Luo Wencong	January 14, 2017
24	黑暗中的光明	Light in the Darkness	Li Di'en	Guo Si'en; Quan Chao	January 14, 2017
25	欲速则不达	Desire for Speed	Luo Wei(罗玮)	Wu Yiwei; Gao Ming	January 15, 2017
26	男孩英雄梦	Boy Hero Dream	Liu Wei(刘维)	Guo Si'en; Quan Chao	January 15, 2017
27	超级雷达	Super Radar	Zhong Cheng	Wu Yiwei; Gao Ming	January 15, 2017
28	狼鱼大变身	Wolffish Great Transformation	Liu Feng	Lai Zhixuan	January 15, 2017
29	风一样的男子	Wind-Like Man	Zhong Cheng	Luo Menghao	January 16, 2017
30	餐厅爆发了	The Restaurant Exploded	Liu Feng	Lai Zhixuan	January 16, 2017
31	征服挑食	Conquering Picky Eaters	Liu Feng	Luo Zongqi	January 16, 2017
32	海底草原	Undersea Grassland	Liang Zikai	Hu Dan; Zhou Fenghua	January 16, 2017
33	家务大作战	Housekeeping Battle	Liang Zikai	Guo Si'en; Quan Chao	January 17, 2017
34	梦幻蜜月	Dream Honeymoon	Liu Wei(刘维)	He Xiaowei; He Yingqiang	January 17, 2017
35	神秘的箱子	Mysterious Box	Liang Zikai	He Xiaowei; He Yingqiang	January 17, 2017
36	电鳗充电宝	Electric Eel Rechargeable Treasure	Liu Wei(刘维)	Wu Yiwei; Gao Ming	January 17, 2017
37	嘻哈百货铺	Magic Department Store	Liu Wei(刘维)	Guo Si'en; Quan Chao	January 18, 2017
38	第三个团圆饼	The Third Reunion Cake	Liu Lifan	Wu Yiwei; Gao Ming	January 18, 2017
39	懒羊羊奇遇记	Paddi Adventure	Zeng Lingling	Luo Menghao; Luo Wencong	January 18, 2017
40	全力以赴	All for You	Liu Feng	He Xiaowei; He Yingqiang	January 18, 2017
41	衣旧情深	Old Clothes Love	Liu Feng	Luo Wei(罗威)	January 19, 2017
42	最好吃的食物	The Best Food	He Jialiang	Cai Yuying; Rong Yuqing	January 19, 2017
43	爸爸不怕	Daddy Is Not Afraid	Liang Zikai	Lai Zhixuan	January 19, 2017
44	沸羊羊的抉择	Sparky's Choice	Luo Wei(罗玮)	Li Jincheng	January 19, 2017
45	我有主见	I Have an Opinion	Liu Wei(刘维)	Hu Dan; Zhou Fenghua	January 20, 2017
46	来个拥抱	Have a Hug	Liu Lifan	Lai Zhixuan	January 20, 2017
47	真正的大厨	The Real Chef	Liu Wei(刘维)	Hu Dan; Zhou Fenghua	January 21, 2017
48	勇于认错	The Courage to Admit Mistakes	Liu Wei(刘维)	Luo Wencong	January 21, 2017
49	鱼卵守护神	Guardian of Fish Eggs	Chen Junchen	Guo Si'en; Quan Chao	January 21, 2017
50	温柔马莉	Gentle Mary	Liang Zikai	He Xiaowei; He Yingqiang	January 21, 2017
51	文武小灰灰	Wenwu Wilie	Liu Lifan	Hu Dan; Zhou Fenghua	January 22, 2017
52	海底卫士	Defender of the Sea Bottom	Luo Wei(罗玮)	Luo Menghao; Luo Wencong	January 22, 2017
53	懒羊羊跑步记	Paddi Running	Luo Wei(罗玮)	Zhong Peng	January 22, 2017
54	不离不弃	Never Leave, Never Give Up	Luo Wei(罗玮)	Huang Xinhui	January 22, 2017
55	自强不息	Self-Improvement	Zhong Cheng	Luo Menghao; Luo Wencong	January 22, 2017
56	美容大事件	Beauty Event	Ying Huochong	Hu Dan; Zhou Fenghua	January 22, 2017
57	最佳选择	Best Choice	Liang Zikai	Luo Menghao; Luo Wencong	January 23, 2017
58	深海厨王	Deep-Sea Kitchen King	Liu Feng	Wu Yiwei; Gao Ming	January 23, 2017
59	最后的碎片	The Last Fragment	Luo Wei(罗玮)	Cai Yuying; Rong Yuqing	January 23, 2017
60	英雄回归	Return of the Hero	Liu Lifan; Liu Feng	Cai Yuying; Rong Yuqing	January 23, 2017

=== War of Invention ===
No.	Chinese title	English title	Script	Director	Original air date
1	寻找妙多多（上）	Looking for Dodo (First)	Liu Feng	Huang Junming	July 12, 2017
2	寻找妙多多（下）	Looking for Dodo (Last)	Liu Feng	Huang Junming	July 12, 2017
3	妙宝出动	Miao Bao Out	Liu Feng	Xiang Jiajun; Li Feilong	July 12, 2017
4	还原按钮	Restore the Button	Chen Junchen	Li Ruiyun	July 12, 2017
5	我要出名	I Want to Be Famous	He Jialiang	Li Feilong	July 12, 2017
6	重力手电筒	Gravity Flashlight	Liu Feng	Li Ruiyun	July 13, 2017
7	一球定友谊	One Ball Fixes Friendship	Luo Wei(罗玮)	Quan Chao	July 13, 2017
8	替身气球	Substitute Balloon	Liu Wei(刘维)	Zhou Zeju	July 13, 2017
9	移动电话亭	Mobile Phone Booth	Luo Wei(罗玮)	Lu Wei	July 13, 2017
10	妙多多病了	Dodo Is Sick	Liang Zikai	Cai Yuying	July 13, 2017
11	神秘花园	Mystery Garden	Liang Zikai	Lu Wei	July 14, 2017
12	妈妈的冬瓜汤	Mom's Winter Melon Soup	Luo Wei(罗玮)	Lu Wei	July 14, 2017
13	转移泡泡枪	Transfer Bubble Gun	Liu Wei(刘维)	Huang Junming	July 14, 2017
14	疯狂过山车	Crazy Roller Coaster	Chen Junchen	Li Ruiyun	July 14, 2017
15	月亮去哪儿	Where the Moon Goes	He Jialiang	Lu Wei	July 15, 2017
16	长高竹笋	Grow Tall Bamboo Shoots	Luo Wei(罗玮)	Huang Junming; Luo Wencong	July 15, 2017
17	小杰快跑	Xiao Jie Run	Liang Zikai	Guo Si'en	July 15, 2017
18	塑形风筒	Shape the Wind Turbine	Liu Feng	Lu Qinghua	July 15, 2017
19	神奇画笔	Magic Paintbrush	Liu Wei(刘维)	Xiang Jiajun	July 15, 2017
20	小灰灰特训记	Wilie Special Training	Zeng Lingling	Dong Long	July 15, 2017
21	纵情溜冰鞋	Ice Skates	Luo Wei(罗玮)	Rong Yuqing	July 15, 2017
22	恒温棉被	Thermostatic Quilt	He Jialiang	Cai Yuying	July 16, 2017
23	动物耳朵	Animal Ears	Zhong Cheng	Lu Wei	July 16, 2017
24	能力大爆发	Ability to Explode	Chen Junchen	Lu Qinghua	July 16, 2017
25	我怕挠痒痒	I'm Afraid of Tickling	Liu Feng	Lu Qinghua	July 16, 2017
26	特别的植物	Special Plants	Chen Junchen	Xiang Jiajun	July 16, 2017
27	行动管家	Action Butler	Liu Feng	Huang Xinhui	July 16, 2017
28	变身腰带	Transformation Belt	He Jialiang	Quan Chao	July 16, 2017
29	相反木偶	Contrary Puppet	Liu Feng	Rong Yuqing; Lu Wei	July 17, 2017
30	时空日历	Time Calendar	Liu Wei(刘维)	Dong Long	July 17, 2017
31	唤醒铃铛	Wake Up Bell	He Jialiang	Huang Junming	July 17, 2017
32	礼物流星	Gift Meteor	He Jialiang	Lu Qinghua	July 17, 2017
33	大汉与手偶	Big Man With Hand Puppet	He Jialiang	Lu Qinghua	July 17, 2017
34	倾听耳机	Listening Headphones	Liu Wei(刘维)	Cai Yuying	July 18, 2017
35	家庭同乐节	Family Fun Festival	Li Disi	Luo Menghao	July 18, 2017
36	灰太狼老师	Teacher Wolffy	Lu Yiyong	Lu Wei	July 18, 2017
37	复制云朵	Copy Clouds	He Jialiang	Zhou Zeju; Luo Wencong	July 18, 2017
38	影子伙伴	Shadow Partner	Liu Feng	Lu Qinghua	July 19, 2017
39	礼物爷爷	Gift Grandpa	Liu Wei(刘玮)	Liao Jincong; He Yingqiang	July 19, 2017
40	入梦枕头	Into the Dream Pillow	Liu Wei(刘维)	Lu Wei	July 19, 2017
41	暖羊羊的发明危机	Jonie's Invention Crisis	Liang Zikai	Li Feilong; Xiang Jiajun	July 19, 2017
42	变妆魔术布	Change Makeup Magic Cloth	Lu Yiyong	Lu Qinghua	July 20, 2017
43	魅力光环	Charming Halo	Liu Wei(刘维)	Huang Junming; He Yingqiang	July 20, 2017
44	延伸橡皮筋	Extension Rubber Band	He Jialiang	Lu Qinghua	July 20, 2017
45	听话蛋糕	Obedient Cake	He Jialiang	Luo Menghao	July 20, 2017
46	最佳搭档	Best Partner	Liu Feng	Rong Yuqing	July 22, 2017
47	空间放大器	Space Amplifier	He Jialiang	Lu Wei	July 22, 2017
48	场景变换画册	Scene Change Album	Liu Feng	Huang Xinhui	July 22, 2017
49	物品复原器	Object Restorer	Zhong Cheng	Lu Qinghua	July 22, 2017
50	村长大本领	Village Chief's Great Skills	Liang Zikai	Luo Menghao	July 23, 2017
51	接力棒	Relay Baton	Chen Junchen	Lu Wei	July 23, 2017
52	时光平板	Time Plate	Chen Junchen	Lu Wei	July 23, 2017
53	永远的粉丝	Forever a Fan	Liu Feng	Quan Chao	July 23, 2017
54	能力危机	Ability Crisis	Chen Junchen	Lu Qinghua	July 24, 2017
55	珍贵的友谊	Precious Friendship	Lu Yiyong	Huang Xinhui	July 24, 2017
56	情景跳进器	Scenario Jumper	Liu Wei(刘维)	Lu Qinghua	July 24, 2017
57	电视世界传送仪	TV World Transmitter	Luo Wei(罗玮)	Liao Jincong	July 25, 2017
58	移动发条	Mobile Clockwork	He Jialiang	Li Feilong	July 25, 2017
59	最强武器	The Strongest Weapon	Luo Wei(罗玮)	Zhou Zeju	July 25, 2017
60	不可能的任务	Mission Impossible	Luo Wei(罗玮)	Cai Yuying	July 25, 2017

=== Flying Island: The Sky Adventure ===
No.	Chinese title	English title	Script	Director	Original air date
01	向天空出发	Marching to the Sky	Liang Zikai	Huang Junming	January 27, 2018
02	遇见机械鸟	Meeting the Mechanical Bird	Liu Feng	Cai Yuying	January 27, 2018
03	破碎的嘻哈火车	The Broken Magic Train	Luo Wei(罗玮)	Xu Chang	January 27, 2018
04	新嘻哈号	The New Magic Train	Luo Wei(罗玮)	Li Ruiyun	January 27, 2018
05	天气工厂	The Weather Factory	Luo Wei(罗玮)	Rong Yuqing	January 28, 2018
06	极光果养成记	Growing Aurora Fruit	Liu Feng	Chen Huiyan	January 28, 2018
07	嘻哈分体	Magic Train Divide	Liu Feng	Chen Huiyan	January 28, 2018
08	加班危机	Overtime Crisis	Huang Zexuan	Huang Junming	January 28, 2018
09	展翅高飞	Spread Your Wings and Fly High	Xie Huihao	Rong Yuqing	January 28, 2018
10	天气种子	Weather Seeds	Chen Xiaodan	Chen Huiyan	January 28, 2018
11	奔跑吧懒羊羊	Running Paddi!	Shi Yuan	Chen Huiyan	January 29, 2018
12	努力的果实	The Fruits of Hard Work	Liang Zikai	Chen Huiyan	January 29, 2018
13	灰太狼的真心	Wolffy's Good Intentions	Liang Zikai	Xu Chang	January 29, 2018
14	彩虹城	Rainbow City	Liu Wei(刘维)	Cai Yuying	January 29, 2018
15	灰太狼的真面目	Wolffy's True Colors	Liu Wei(刘维)	Li Ruiyun	January 29, 2018
16	彩虹节闯关	The Rainbow Festival Challenge	Liang Zikai	Huang Junming	January 30, 2018
17	彩虹拼图大比拼	Race to Complete the Rainbow Puzzle	Li Disi	Chen Huiyan	January 30, 2018
18	热心帮倒忙	Rainbow Beans Try to Help	Liu Feng	Chen Huiyan	January 30, 2018
19	制造彩虹	Creating Rainbow	Liu Wei(刘维)	Li Ruiyun	January 30, 2018
20	颜色笔哪去了	Where is the Color Pencil	Luo Wei(罗玮)	Chen Huiyan	January 30, 2018
21	分身危机	Crisis of Doppelgangers	Xie Huihao	Xu Chang	January 31, 2018
22	都是好朋友	Good Friends	Huang Zexuan	Chen Huiyan	January 31, 2018
23	失踪的懒羊羊	The Missing Paddi	Chen Xiaodan	Chen Huiyan	January 31, 2018
24	快乐欢送会	The Happy Farewell Party	Li Disi	He Yingqiang	January 31, 2018
25	风暴中的气球城	The Balloon City Amid the Storm	Liang Zikai	Cai Yuying	January 31, 2018
26	强硬射线	The Beam that Makes You Strong and Tough	Liang Zikai	Zhou Zeju	February 1, 2018
27	胆小英雄	The Coward Hero	Liu Wei(刘维)	Chen Huiyan	February 1, 2018
28	末日武器	Doomsday Weapon	Liu Feng	Luo Wencong	February 1, 2018
29	全城警报	Everyone Alert!	Li Disi	Xu Chang	February 1, 2018
30	当气球粘上狼	When Wolffy Sticks to Balloon	Liu Feng	Chen Huiyan	February 1, 2018
31	小羊上课堂	All Goats at School	Chen Xiaodan	Chen Huiyan	February 2, 2018
32	梦想成真	Dreams Come True	Huang Zexuan	Chen Huiyan	February 2, 2018
33	功亏一篑	One Step Away	Liu Wei(刘维)	Luo Menghao	February 2, 2018
34	将军之战	The Battle of Generals	Xie Huihao	Chen Huiyan	February 2, 2018
35	危机爆发	The Crisis!	Luo Wei(罗玮)	Chen Huiyan	February 2, 2018
36	冲出风暴	Escaping the Storm	Luo Wei(罗玮)	Li Ruiyun	February 3, 2018
37	村长宝宝	Baby Chief	Liu Wei(刘维)	Huang Junming	February 3, 2018
38	宝宝生病了	The Baby Gets Sick	Liang Zikai	Zhou Zeju; Luo Menghao	February 3, 2018
39	无敌小宝宝	The Invincible Baby	Luo Wei(罗玮)	Chen Huiyan	February 3, 2018
40	“时光星”来了	Time Star Is Here	Liu Feng	Chen Huiyan	February 3, 2018
41	星星与宝石	The Stars and the Gem	Xie Huihao	Li Ruiyun	February 4, 2018
42	沉睡的星星镇	The Sleeping Starry Town	Li Disi	Chen Huiyan	February 4, 2018
43	星星大宣传	Publicising the Stars	Huang Zexuan	Chen Huiyan	February 4, 2018
44	长老的表演	The Elder's Performance	Liang Zikai	Quan Chao	February 4, 2018
45	神奇星能力	The Amazing Power of the Stars	Li Disi	Chen Huiyan	February 4, 2018
46	新的节目	New Show	Liu Feng	Chen Xiongbin	February 5, 2018
47	变小危机	The Crisis of Shrinking	Liu Wei(刘维)	Luo Wencong	February 5, 2018
48	奇怪的暖羊羊	The Strange Jonie	Chen Xiaodan	Zhou Fenghua	February 5, 2018
49	勇闯巨人屋	Braving the Giant House	Luo Wei(罗玮)	Guo Si'en	February 5, 2018
50	云海隧道	Cloud Sea Tunnel	Liang Zikai	Cai Muyan	February 5, 2018
51	隐藏的暖羊羊	The Hiding Jonie	Huang Zexuan	Chen Huiyan	February 6, 2018
52	红太狼在哪儿	Where Is Wolnie	Chen Xiaodan	Chen Huiyan	February 6, 2018
53	空中水战	Water Battle in the Sky	Xie Huihao	Chen Huiyan	February 6, 2018
54	重逢	Reunion	Li Disi	Cai Yuying	February 6, 2018
55	往事	Bygone Memories	Liu Feng	Xu Chang	February 6, 2018
56	最后的天晶	The Final Sky Crystal	Liu Wei(刘维)	Luo Menghao	February 7, 2018
57	灰太狼的分身	Wolffy's Doppelgangers	Luo Wei(罗玮)	Li Zeju	February 7, 2018
58	抓捕分身	Capturing Doppelgangers	Liu Hui	Cai Yuying	February 7, 2018
59	海底的阴谋	The Underwater Conspiracy	Liu Wei(刘维)	Rong Yuqing; Luo Wencong	February 7, 2018
60	最后一战	Final Battle	Liang Zikai	Huang Junming	February 7, 2018

=== Mighty Little Defenders ===
No.	Chinese title	English title	Script	Director	Original air date
1	羊村陷落	The Fall of Goats' Village	Liang Zikai	Cai Yuying	January 18, 2019
2	月圆之夜	Night of the Full Moon	Liu Wei(刘维)	Huang Junming	January 18, 2019
3	狗狗好伙伴	Doggy, a Good Friend	Li Disi	Pu Zhikang	January 18, 2019
4	灰太狼的诡计	Wolffy's Scheme	Luo Wei(罗玮)	Rong Yuqing	January 18, 2019
5	身份危机	Identity Crisis	Liu Feng	Xu Chang	January 19, 2019
6	强者之力	The Power of the Mighty	Chen Xiaodan	Zhou Zeju	January 19, 2019
7	坚毅之弓	The Bow of Perseverance	Xie Huihao	He Yingqiang	January 19, 2019
8	大师兄羊果果	Uncle Gogoa	Huang Zexuan	Chen Huiyan	January 19, 2019
9	制胜关键	The Key to Victory	Liang Zikai	Quan Chao	January 19, 2019
10	失而复得	Regain the Lost	Liu Wei(刘维)	Hu Dan	January 19, 2019
11	大师兄的理念	Gogoa's Belief	Li Disi	Cai Muyan	January 19, 2019
12	石中之铲	The Spatula in the Rock	Huang Zexuan	Lin Jiashu	January 20, 2019
13	追忆当年	Reminiscing	Luo Wei(罗玮)	Chen Lijin	January 20, 2019
14	医者仁心	A Doctor's Compassion	Liu Feng	Liao Jincong	January 20, 2019
15	自投罗网	Walking Into a Trap	Xie Huihao	Liang Jiaqi	January 20, 2019
16	绝处逢生	Back from the Brink	Chen Xiaodan	Chen Guixiong	January 20, 2019
17	希望之光	The Light of Hope	Liang Zikai	Qin Xiaofeng	January 20, 2019
18	狗狗不是灰太狼	Doggy Isn't Wolffy	Liu Wei(刘维)	Rong Yuqing	January 20, 2019
19	奇幻森林	The Fantasy Forest	Liu Feng	Quan Chao	January 21, 2019
20	风的声音	The Sound of Wind	Huang Zexuan	Hu Dan	January 21, 2019
21	花匠精神	The Spirit of the Gardener	Xie Huihao	Chen Huiyan	January 21, 2019
22	爱心防护	Love Protection	Li Disi	Qin Xiaofeng	January 21, 2019
23	美味的秘诀	The Secret to Deliciousness	Liang Zikai	Chen Guixiong	January 21, 2019
24	父子相认	The Reunion of Father and Son	Chen Xiaodan	Liao Jincong	January 21, 2019
25	背信弃义	Betrayal and Disloyalty	Liu Feng	Lin Jiashu	January 21, 2019
26	重新振作	Back to the Game	Luo Wei(罗玮)	Chen Lijin	January 21, 2019
27	真正的伙伴	Real Friends	Liu Wei	He Yingqiang	January 21, 2019
28	打败白眼狼	Defeat Wolfram	Huang Zexuan	Pu Zhikang	January 22, 2019
29	林中误会	Misunderstanding in the Woods	Luo Wei (罗玮)	Xu Chang	January 22, 2019
30	冠军情缘	Championship Bond	Chen Xiaodan	Huang Junming	January 22, 2019
31	再见挚友	Reunion of Best Friends	Li Disi	Zhou Zeju	January 22, 2019
32	狼将军的阴谋	General Wolf's Conspiracy	Xie Huihao	Liang Jiaqi	January 22, 2019
33	狼将军的真面目	General Wolf's True Colors	Liang Zikai	Cai Yuying	January 22, 2019
34	狼将军的追击	General Wolf's Chase	Liu Zemin	Cai Muyan	January 22, 2019
35	灰太狼出走	Wolffy's Adventure	Luo Wei (罗玮)	Qin Xiaofeng	January 22, 2019
36	一家团聚	The Reunion	Xie Huihao	Chen Huiyan	January 22, 2019
37	万能漆不见了	The Missing All-Purpose Paint	Liu Wei (刘维)	Lin Jiashu	January 23, 2019
38	狼族训练营	Wolf Camp	Huang Zexuan	Pu Zhikang	January 23, 2019
39	迷离奇阵	Inside The Maze	Liang Zikai	Liao Jincong	January 23, 2019
40	重修旧好	Reconciliation	Liu Feng	Liang Jiaqi	January 23, 2019
41	曾经的狼将军	Chapper's Past	Li Disi	Xu Chang	January 23, 2019
42	狼性草	The Wolf Herb	Chen Xiaodan	Cai Yuying	January 23, 2019
43	储藏室之战	The Battle in the Storeage Room	Liu Zemin	Liang Jiaqi	January 23, 2019
44	团结的力量	Team Power	Chen Xiaodan	Rong Yuqing	January 23, 2019
45	提取狼性草	Extracting the Wolf Herb	Liu Wei (刘维)	Cai Muyan	January 23, 2019
46	捕狼高手	Wolf Hunter	Xie Huihao	Huang Junming	January 24, 2019
47	沸羊羊的觉醒	Sparky Wakes Up	Luo Wei (罗玮)	Zhou Zeju	January 24, 2019
48	伐木工美羊羊	Tibbie the Woodcutter	Huang Zexuan	Quan Chao	January 24, 2019
49	懒羊羊的厨师梦	Paddi's Dream to Be a Chef	Li Disi	Hu Dan	January 24, 2019
50	良医归来	The Doctor Returns	Liu Feng	He Yingqiang	January 24, 2019
51	梦幻奇境	Fantasyland	Liang Zikai	Xu Chang	January 24, 2019
52	患难与共	Through Thick and Thin	Xu Simin	Liao Jincong	January 24, 2019
53	前辈变狼怎么办	What to Do If the Seniors Become Wolves	Liu Feng	Hu Dan	January 24, 2019
54	羊村异变	The Abnormal Change in Goats' Village	Li Disi	Quan Chao	January 24, 2019
55	各执一词	Each Sticks to His Own Version	Luo Wei (罗玮)	Liang Jiaqi	January 25, 2019
56	逃离狼堡	Escaping from Wolf Fortress	Chen Xiaodan	Zhou Zeju	January 25, 2019
57	重燃希望	Rekindling Hope	Huang Zexuan	He Yingqiang	January 25, 2019
58	狼嚎的含义	The Meaning of Howling	Xie Huihao	Rong Yuqing	January 25, 2019
59	枪中世界	The World Inside the Pistol	Liu Wei (刘维)	Huang Junming	January 26, 2019
60	狼羊新未来	The New Future of Wolves and Goats	Liang Zikai	Pu Zhikang	January 26, 2019

=== Rescue Across Time ===
No.	Chinese title	English title	Script	Director	Original air date(TV)	Original air date(Web)
1	冰封遗迹	Found the Ruins, Weslie Was in Trouble	Liang Zikai	He Yingqiang	July 12, 2019	July 12, 2019
2	霸王之战	Big Dinosaur Appears	Liang Zikai	Liang Jiaqi	July 12, 2019	July 12, 2019
3	时空大混乱	Time Chaos	Liu Feng	Rong Yuqing	July 12, 2019	July 12, 2019
4	陌生的小羊	Wolnie Was Misunderstood as a Bad Guy	Chen Lijin	Huang Zexuan	July 12, 2019	July 12, 2019
5	新朋友	The Wolf and Lamb Became Friends	Xie Huihao	Zhou Zeju	July 12, 2019	July 12, 2019
6	小智进村	Turns Out He Was Father	Liu Zemin	Quan Chao	July 13, 2019	July 12, 2019
7	智羊羊的梦想	Dad's Dream	Liu Wei(刘维)	Cai Muyan	July 13, 2019	July 13, 2019
8	游园之日	Go to Amusement Park With Dad	Chen Xiaodan	Chen Xiongbin	July 13, 2019	July 13, 2019
9	又见爸爸	Childhood Self	Huang Zexuan	Chen Lijin	July 13, 2019	July 13, 2019
10	爸爸的礼物	Father's Gift	Liang Zikai	Rong Yuqing	July 13, 2019	July 13, 2019
11	黑白双蛋	Egg Brothers	Liu Wei	Zhou Zeju	July 13, 2019	July 13, 2019
12	逃脱计划	Brave Tibbie	Liu Feng	Quan Chao	July 13, 2019	July 13, 2019
13	被困狼堡	Cute Little Wolf	Liu Zemin	Chen Huiyan; Huang Junming	July 14, 2019	July 14, 2019
14	真假黑大帅	Smart Bad Guy	Chen Xiaodan	Chen Huiyan; Huang Junming	July 14, 2019	July 14, 2019
15	光辉母爱	Great Maternal Love	Xie Huihao	Liang Jiaqi	July 14, 2019	July 14, 2019
16	回到正轨	Friends Became Bad Guys	Liu Wei(刘维)	Chen Huiyan; Huang Junming	July 14, 2019	July 14, 2019
17	智斗“自己”	Baby Wolnie	Liu Zemin	Chen Xiongbin	July 14, 2019	July 14, 2019
18	机械羊归来	Old Friend Is Back	Liu Feng	Cai Muyan	July 15, 2019	July 14, 2019
19	被困冰底	Trapped in a Cave	Huang Zexaun	Chen Huiyan; Huang Junming	July 15, 2019	July 15, 2019
20	善良“敌人”	Kind Enemy	Liang Zikai	He Yingqiang	July 15, 2019	July 15, 2019
21	敌友不分	Regardless of Enemy	Chen Xiaodan	Rong Yuqing	July 15, 2019	July 15, 2019
22	消失的机械羊	Saving Friend	Chen Xiaodan	Cai Muyan	July 15, 2019	July 15, 2019
23	拯救机械羊	Friend are Control by Bad Guys	Liu Wei(刘维)	Chen Lijin	July 16, 2019	July 15, 2019
24	大家的希望	Smart Weslie Saved Everyone	Liang Zikai	Chen Huiyan; Huang Junming	July 16, 2019	July 15, 2019
25	朋友再遇	Old Friend	Liu Zemin	Quan Chao	July 16, 2019	July 16, 2019
26	恢复原样	The Ugly Lamb Became a Beautiful Lamb	Huang Zexaun	Zhou Zeju	July 16, 2019	July 16, 2019
27	漫长的告别	Say Goodbye to Friends	Liu Feng	He Yingqiang	July 16, 2019	July 16, 2019
28	刀羊的梦想	The Knife Sheep's Dream	Xie Huihao	Chen Huiyan; Huang Junming	July 17, 2019	July 16, 2019
29	天赐小宝宝	Suddenly Become a Father	Liu Feng	Chen Xiongbin	July 17, 2019	July 16, 2019
30	淘气宝贝	Naughty Little Baby	Liang Zikai	Chen Huiyan; Huang Junming	July 17, 2019	July 16, 2019
31	懒羊羊当爸爸	First Time as a Dad	Xie Huihao	Liang Jiaqi	July 17, 2019	July 17, 2019
32	宝宝站起来	Baby Stood Up	Liu Zemin	Chen Huiyan; Huang Junming	July 17, 2019	July 17, 2019
33	爸爸不好做	Stay With Baby	Huang Zexuan	Quan Chao	July 17, 2019	July 17, 2019
34	勇闯狼营	Find Dad for Baby	Chen Xiaodan	Zhou Zeju	July 17, 2019	July 17, 2019
35	父子相认	Who Is the Real Father	Liu Wei(刘维)	Chen Xiongbin	July 17, 2019	July 17, 2019
36	消失的红太狼	Poor Wolf	Liu Qingrun	Cai Muyan	July 17, 2019	July 17, 2019
37	奇怪的喜羊羊	Two Wesile	Liu Qingrun	Rong Yuqing	July 17, 2019	July 18, 2019
38	追捕喜羊羊	Wesile Was Caught	Liu Feng	He Yingqiang	July 18, 2019	July 18, 2019
39	双“喜”合璧	The Most Powerful Combination	Chen Xiaodan	Chen Lijin	July 18, 2019	July 18, 2019
40	狼化的喜羊羊	Sheep Into Wolf	Huang Zexuan	Cai Muyan	July 18, 2019	July 18, 2019
41	危机	Weslie Is Going to Die?	Liu Wei(刘维)	Chen Lijin	July 18, 2019	July 18, 2019
42	复活	Weslie Is Safe	Liu Zemin	Quan Chao	July 18, 2019	July 18, 2019
43	爸爸与我	Wolffy Hides His Father	Liang Zikai	Zhou Zeju	July 19, 2019	July 19, 2019
44	严厉的爸爸	Dad Is Strict	Xie Huihao	Liang Jiaqi; Zhou Zeju	July 19, 2019	July 19, 2019
45	不一样的父爱	Fatherly Love	Liang Zikai	Rong Yuqing	July 19, 2019	July 19, 2019
46	神秘手下	Catch Sheep Together	Liu Wei(刘维)	He Yingqiang	July 19, 2019	July 19, 2019
47	古怪的灰太狼	Weird Wolf	Xie Huihao	Chen Huiyan; Huang Junming	July 19, 2019	July 19, 2019
48	身份暴露	Grandfather	Liu Feng	Chen Xiongbin	July 19, 2019	July 19, 2019
49	嫌疑人	The Suspect	Chen Xiaodan	Quan Chao	July 20, 2019	July 20, 2019
50	中转站大危机	Big Crisis	Liu Qingrun	Liang Jiaqi; Cai Muyan	July 20, 2019	July 20, 2019
51	摇摆的灰太狼	Reluctant to Dad	Huang Zexuan	He Yingqiang	July 20, 2019	July 20, 2019
52	背道而驰	Friend's Betrayal	Liu Zemin	Rong Yuqing	July 20, 2019	July 20, 2019
53	合作	The Lambs Was Caught	Chen Xiaodan	Cai Muyan	July 20, 2019	July 20, 2019
54	一拍两散	Broken Friendship	Liu Feng	Chen Xiongbin	July 20, 2019	July 20, 2019
55	小狼人的秘密	He Is Brother	Liu Qingrun	Zhou Zeju	July 21, 2019	July 21, 2019
56	真相与险情	The Truth	Liu Zemin	Chen Lijin	July 21, 2019	July 21, 2019
57	黑太狼的选择	Father as a Mountain	Huang Zexuan	Quan Chao	July 21, 2019	July 21, 2019
58	送爸爸“回家”	Take Dad "Home"	Xie Huihao	Chen Lijin	July 21, 2019	July 21, 2019
59	末日	The Doomsday	Liang Zikai	Rong Yuqing	July 21, 2019	July 21, 2019
60	逆转时空	Spacetime Reverted	Liu Wei(刘维)	He Yingqiang	July 21, 2019	July 21, 2019

=== The Intriguing Alien Guests ===
No.	Chinese title	English title	Script	Director	Original air date(TV)	Original air date(Web)
1	初次见面	First Meeting	Liu Zemin	Chen Lijin	January 10, 2020	
2	我要找哥哥	I'm Looking for My Brother	Liu Zemin	Lin Jiashu	January 10, 2020	
3	新的家人	A New Family Member	Liang Zikai	Rong Yuqing	January 10, 2020	
4	失忆风波	Amnesia Crisis	Liang Zikai	Quan Chao	January 10, 2020	
5	助人之心	Helping Heart	Liu Qingrun	Chen Xiongbin	January 10, 2020	
6	只想和你一起玩	Play Only with You	Liu Feng	Cai Muyan	January 10, 2020	
7	昆虫公主	Insect Princess	Liang Zikai	He Yingqiang	January 11, 2020	
8	懒羊羊大扫除	Paddi's Cleaning Up	Chen Xiaodan	Zhou Zeju	January 11, 2020	
9	分身救援	Rescue by Doppelgangers	Liu Feng	Quan Chao	January 11, 2020	
10	养蚊为患	Keeping Mosquitoes Makes Trouble	Huang Wenji	Huang Junming	January 11, 2020	
11	七大恶狼来了	The Seven Evil Wolves Come	Huang Wenji	He Yingqiang	January 11, 2020	
12	兴趣之争	Contest of Interest	Liu Qingrun	Huang Junming	January 11, 2020	
13	安全宝贝	Safety Baby	Liang Zikai	Lin Jiashu	January 12, 2020	
14	细菌生病了	Bacterium Catches Cold	Liu Zemin	Huang Junming	January 12, 2020	
15	蜗牛姐姐	Snail Sister	Chen Xiaodan	Huang Junming	January 12, 2020	
16	新来的帮手	A New Assistant	Liu Wei(刘维)	Chen Lijin	January 12, 2020	
17	一起来寻宝	Hunting Treasure Together	Chen Xiaodan	Chen Xiongbin	January 12, 2020	
18	遇见新朋友	Making New Friends	Liu Zemin	Huang Junming	January 12, 2020	
19	饺子大作战	Dumplings Battle	Liu Zemin	Cai Muyan	January 13, 2020	
20	洋娃娃朋友	Doll Friend	Liu Feng	Zhou Zeju	January 13, 2020	
21	找太阳	Looking for the Sun	Huang Wenji	Huang Junming	January 13, 2020	
22	探险传奇	Adventure Legend	Liu Wei(刘维)	Rong Yuqing	January 13, 2020	
23	宝刀未老	Sharp Blade Remains Powerful	Liu Qingrun	Huang Junming	January 13, 2020	
24	告别喜羊羊	Farewell Weslie	Liu Feng	Rong Yuqing	January 13, 2020	
25	无形的敌人	Invisible Enery	Liu Qingrun	Chen Lijin	January 14, 2020	
26	英雄训练日	Hero Training Day	Huang Wenji	Huang Junming	January 14, 2020	
27	儿子生气了	Son Is Angry	Liang Zikai	Cai Muyan	January 14, 2020	
28	网络奇缘	Internet Romance	Liu Feng	He Yingqiang	January 14, 2020	
29	惊喜	Surprise	Liu Zemin	Huang Junming	January 14, 2020	
30	纪念礼物	Memorial Gift	Huang Wenji	Chen Xiongbin	January 14, 2020	
31	爸爸的爱	Dad's Love	Chen Xiaodan	Zhou Zeju	January 15, 2020	
32	我来照顾你	Let Me Look After You	Liang Zikai	Huang Junming	January 15, 2020	
33	觅光奇程	Light Hunting Fantasy	Liu Feng	Cai Muyan	January 15, 2020	
34	小小男子汉	Little Man	Liu Qingrun	Huang Junming	January 15, 2020	
35	毒气危机	Miasma Crisis	Chen Xiaodan	Lin Jiashu	January 15, 2020	
36	村长加油	Cheer Up Chief	Chen Xiaodan	Chen Xiongbin	January 15, 2020	
37	大王的心思	King's Mood	Liu Qingrun	Quan Chao	January 16, 2020	January 16, 2020 (Note: On January 15, 2020, Youku accidentally uploaded episodes 37-40, but privated them the next day until the original update time (18:00).)
38	同心协力	Pull Together	Li Disi	Zhou Zeju	January 16, 2020	January 16, 2020
39	贪吃计划	Esurient Project	Liu Zemin	Rong Yuqing	January 16, 2020	January 16, 2020
40	独力难支	Single-handed Fails	Liu Feng	Zhou Zeju	January 16, 2020	January 16, 2020
41	我要做大王	I Want to Be the King	Liang Zikai	Huang Junming	January 16, 2020	January 16, 2020
42	网瘾危机	Internet Addiction Crisis	Huang Wenji	Rong Yuqing	January 16, 2020	January 16, 2020
43	神奇生物	Magic Creatures	Liu Qingrun	Lin Jiashu	January 17, 2020	
44	古怪慢羊羊	Abnormal Slowly	Liang Zikai	Huang Junming	January 17, 2020	
45	善良的回报	Kindness Pays Off	Liu Qingrun	Quan Chao	January 17, 2020	
46	体感试验	Somatosensory Test	Chen Xiaodan	Chen Lijin	January 17, 2020	
47	古细菌的痛	Archaea's Pain	Liu Zemin	Huang Junming	January 17, 2020	
48	自立门户	Independence	Huang Hunxuan	Huang Junming	January 17, 2020	
49	乌龙情报员	Unreliable Intelligencer	Huang Wenji	Huang Junming	January 18, 2020	
50	哥哥的线索	Brother's Clue	Huang Wenji	Chen Xiongbin	January 18, 2020	
51	细菌的阴谋	Bacteria's Plot	Chen Xiaodan	Cai Muyan	January 18, 2020	
52	病毒的选择	Virus's Choice	Liu Zemin	Chen Lijin	January 18, 2020	
53	失控的蘑菇	Ballistic Mushroom	Liu Feng	Cai Muyan	January 18, 2020	
54	家具怪物	Furniture Monster	Huang Wenji	Quan Chao	January 18, 2020	
55	不变的信任	Constant Trust	Liu Zemin	Zhou Zeju	January 19, 2020	
56	存亡时刻	Critical Moment	Chen Xiaodan	Rong Yuqing	January 19, 2020	
57	灰太狼的逆袭	Wolffy's Counterattack	Liu Qingrun	Chen Xiongbin	January 19, 2020	
58	逃出恶境	Escape from Bad Situations	Liu Feng	Lin Jiashu	January 19, 2020	
59	另一个大王	Another King	Liang Zikai	Quan Chao	January 19, 2020	
60	团结	Unity	Liang Zikai	Chen Lijin	January 19, 2020	

=== Against the Dark Force ===
No.	Chinese title	English title	Script	Director	Original air date
1	神奇的开端	A Magical Start	Liu Zemin	Chen Xiongbin	July 17, 2020
2	初入奇猫国	New to Cat Kingdom	Chen Xiaodan	Lin Jiashu	July 17, 2020
3	陷入绝境	In a Desperate Situation	Liu Qingrun	Cai Muyan	July 17, 2020
4	雷电山谷	Thunder Valley	Huang Wenji	Huang Junming, Hu Dan	July 17, 2020
5	奔向车站	Running Towards the Station	Chen Xiaodan	Huang Junming, Hu Dan	July 17, 2020
6	你好，奇花镇	Hello, Qihua Town	Huang Wenji	Rong Yuqing	July 17, 2020
7	花田危机	Flower Field Crisis	Liu Zemin	Huang Junming, Hu Dan	July 18, 2020
8	潜入	Infiltration	Huang Zexuan	Zhou Zeju	July 18, 2020
9	越狱风波	Prison Break Fiasco	Liu Zemin	Quan Chao	July 18, 2020
10	营救	Rescue	Li Disi	Huang Junming, Hu Dan	July 18, 2020
11	毒荆棘林	Poisonous Thorn Forest	Chen Xiaodan	Chen Lijin	July 18, 2020
12	七色花开	Seven-Colored Flowers Bloom	Huang Zexuan	He Yingqiang	July 18, 2020
13	遭遇奇兽	Encounter With Strange Beasts	Liu Zemin	Zhou Zeju	July 19, 2020
14	神秘的冰雪镇	Mysterious Ice Town	Li Disi	Huang Junming, Hu Dan	July 19, 2020
15	躲猫猫	Hide-and-Seek	Liu Qingrun	Huang Junming, Hu Dan	July 19, 2020
16	冰雪乐园	Ice Land	Huang Wenji	Chen Lijin	July 19, 2020
17	旧友合作	Old Friends Cooperation	Huang Zexuan	Lin Jiashu	July 19, 2020
18	散落的碎片	Scattered Pieces	Liu Zemin	He Yingqiang	July 19, 2020
19	危险的温泉之旅	Dangerous Spa Trip	Li Disi	Huang Junming, Hu Dan	July 20, 2020
20	雪地反击战	Snow Counter Strike	Li Disi	Quan Chao	July 20, 2020
21	雪城奇迹	Snow City Miracle	Liu Zemin	Rong Yuqing	July 20, 2020
22	流沙镇	Quicksand Town	Shi Jianna	Cai Muyan	July 20, 2020
23	救命水源	Saving Water	Chen Xiaodan	Huang Junming, Hu Dan	July 20, 2020
24	夺水	Capture the Water	Liu Qingrun	Chen Xiongbin	July 20, 2020
25	拯救沸羊羊	Save Sparky	Chen Xiaodan	Huang Junming, Hu Dan	July 21, 2020
26	逃离	Escape	Liu Qingrun	Huang Junming, Hu Dan	July 21, 2020
27	流浪沙漠	Wandering Desert	Liu Zemin	Huang Junming, Hu Dan	July 21, 2020
28	解除手环	Unlock the Bracelet	Shi Jianna	Cai Muyan	July 21, 2020
29	深入水灵镇	Deep Into Shuiling Town	Shi Jianna	Chen Xiongbin	July 21, 2020
30	大闹水灵镇	Rumble in Shuiling Town	Liu Qingrun	Rong Yuqing	July 21, 2020
31	对战暖羊羊	Fight Against Jonie	Chen Xiaodan	Zhou Zeju	July 22, 2020
32	暖羊羊的娃娃	Jonie's Doll	Liu Zemin	Huang Junming, Hu Dan	July 22, 2020
33	真相浮现	The Truth Emerges	Chen Xiaodan	Huang Junming, Hu Dan	July 22, 2020
34	寻找浮沉珠	Searching for the Floating Pearl	Liu Qingrun	Huang Junming, Hu Dan	July 22, 2020
35	被困鱼腹	Trapped in the Belly of the Fish	Shi Jianna	Lin Jiashu	July 22, 2020
36	惊险游戏	Thrilling Game	Liu Zemin	Huang Junming, Hu Dan	July 22, 2020
37	计划生变	Change of Plans	Liu Zemin	He Yingqiang	July 23, 2020
38	失落的皇冠	The Lost Crown	Zhu Haiying	Huang Junming, Hu Dan	July 23, 2020
39	奇兽的秘密	Secrets of the Curious Beasts	Shi Jianna	Quan Chao	July 23, 2020
40	伤心背叛	Sad Betrayal	Liu Qingrun	Chen Lijin	July 23, 2020
41	姐妹相遇	Sisters Meet	Chen Xiaodan	Rong Yuqing	July 23, 2020
42	密道	Secret Passage	Shi Jianna	Rong Yuqing	July 23, 2020
43	明日终结	The End of Mingri	Liu Zemin	Lin Jiashu	July 24, 2020
44	大病初愈	The First Recovery From a Serious Illness	Chen Xiaodan	Huang Junming, Hu Dan	July 24, 2020
45	奇怪的皓月	Strange Haoyue	Liu Qingrun	Huang Junming, Hu Dan	July 24, 2020
46	神秘的合作	Mysterious Cooperation	Zhu Haiying	Huang Junming, Hu Dan	July 24, 2020
47	拨开迷雾	Clearing the Fog	Liu Qingrun	He Yingqiang	July 24, 2020
48	一线希望	A Ray of Hope	Liu Zemin	Quan Chao	July 24, 2020
49	光剑争夺	Lightsaber Scramble	Zhu Haiying	Cai Muyan	July 25, 2020
50	至暗时刻	The Darkest Hour	Chen Xiaodan	Chen Lijin	July 25, 2020
51	奇猫国大乱	Cat Kingdom Mayhem	Liu Qingrun	Zhou Zeju	July 25, 2020
52	无尽黑暗	Endless Darkness	Liu Zemin	Chen Xiongbin	July 25, 2020
53	青青草原的危机	Crisis in Green Green Grassland	Chen Nan	Huang Junming, Hu Dan	July 25, 2020
54	再入奇猫国	Re-Enter Cat Kingdom	Chen Xiaodan	Quan Chao	July 25, 2020
55	危机中的伙伴	Partners in Crisis	Liu Zemin	Zhou Zeju	July 26, 2020
56	追踪奇兽	Tracking Curious Beasts	Chen Nan	Cai Muyan	July 26, 2020
57	再袭雷电谷	Raiding Thunder Valley Again	Zhu Haiying	Lin Jiashu	July 26, 2020
58	回忆	Memories	Liu Qingrun	He Yingqiang	July 26, 2020
59	巨岛陨落	The Fall of the Giant Island	Chen Xiaodan	Chen Lijin	July 26, 2020
60	新的开始	A New Beginning	Liu Zemin	Chen Xiongbin	July 26, 2020

=== Dunk for Victories ===
No.	Chinese title	English title	Script	Director	Original air date
1	我要打篮球	I Want to Play Basketball	Liu Zemin	Quan Chao, Chen Xiongbin, Rong Yuqing	January 22, 2021
2	霸道强者	Domineering Strongest	Liang Zikai	He Yingqiang, Zhou Zeju	January 22, 2021
3	神秘蒙面侠	Mysterious Masked Man	Zhu Haiying	Huang Junming, Chen Lijin	January 22, 2021
4	寻觅高人	Looking for a Professional	Liu Feng	Huang Junming, Chen Lijin	January 22, 2021
5	唯一的机会	The Only Chance	Shi Jianna	Zhou Zeju	January 23, 2021
6	合作	Team Up	Liu Qingrun	Huang Junming, Chen Lijin	January 23, 2021
7	懒羊羊入队	Paddi Joins the Team	Huang Wenji	Huang Junming, Chen Lijin	January 23, 2021
8	偶像的力量	The Power of Idol	Chen Xiaodan	Huang Junming, Chen Lijin	January 23, 2021
9	篮筐下的守护神	The Guardian Under the Hoop	Geng Yimiao	Huang Junming, Chen Lijin	January 24, 2021
10	篮球主将	Basketball Veteran	Liang Zikai	Huang Junming, Chen Lijin	January 24, 2021
11	羊队冲冲冲	Goat Team Go Go Go	Liu Feng	Huang Junming, Chen Lijin	January 24, 2021
12	前夜	Eve	Liu Qingrun	Huang Junming, Chen Lijin	January 24, 2021
13	激烈初战	Fierce Debut	Huang Wenji	Cai Muyan, Lin Jiashu	January 25, 2021
14	神秘高手	Mysterious Master	Shi Jianna	Huang Junming, Chen Lijin	January 25, 2021
15	狮子的梦想	Lion's Dream	Shi Jianna	Huang Junming, Chen Lijin	January 25, 2021
16	意外的压力	Unexpected Pressure	Zhu Haiying	He Yingqiang	January 25, 2021
17	全力以赴的篮球	Trying Best for Basketball	Liu Zemin	Rong Yuqing	January 26, 2021
18	热潮	Fandom	Geng Yimiao	Quan Chao	January 26, 2021
19	球场霸主	Lord of the Court	Shi Jianna	Huang Junming, Chen Lijin	January 26, 2021
20	兔兔危机	Bunny Crisis	Huang Wenji	Huang Junming, Chen Lijin	January 26, 2021
21	神奇的魔术	Migical Magic	Zhu Haiying	Huang Junming, Chen Lijin	January 27, 2021
22	地下之战	Underground Battle	Geng Yimiao	Lin Jiashu	January 27, 2021
23	低谷中的懒羊羊	Paddi in Low Spirits	Liu Zemin	Huang Junming, Chen Lijin	January 27, 2021
24	焕然一新	Brand-new	Liu Feng	Chen Xiongbin	January 27, 2021
25	各自的决心	Respective Determination	Liang Zikai	Cai Muyan	January 28, 2021
26	堂堂正正的胜利	Reasonable Victory	Liang Zikai	He Yingqiang	January 28, 2021
27	真正的强大	True Strength	Liu Qingrun	Rong Yuqing	January 28, 2021
28	振作与破灭	Perk and Shattered	Liu Qingrun	Huang Junming, Chen Lijin	January 28, 2021
29	奇怪的豹姐	Strange Bao Jie	Huang Wenji	Huang Junming, Chen Lijin	January 29, 2021
30	愚蠢的执着	Silly Persistence	Liang Zikai	Huang Junming, Chen Lijin	January 29, 2021
31	更好的控卫	A Better Point Guard	Shi Jianna	Huang Junming, Chen Lijin	January 29, 2021
32	球胜狼的回忆	Qiusheng Lang's Memories	Liu Feng	Huang Junming, Chen Lijin	January 29, 2021
33	一触即发	Explosive Situation	Zhu Haiying	Zhou Zeju	January 30, 2021
34	破阵之章	Chapter of Way Out	Geng Yimiao	Cai Muyan	January 30, 2021
35	因为热爱	Because of Craziness	Liu Zemin	Lin Jiashu	January 30, 2021
36	躲猫猫派对	Hide-and-Seek Party	Geng Yimiao	Huang Junming, Chen Lijin	January 30, 2021
37	鹰狼对决	The Showdown of Eagle and Wolf	Huang Wenji	Quan Chao	January 31, 2021
38	追求	Pursue	Liu Qingrun	Chen Xiongbin	January 31, 2021
39	球场浮沉	Ups and Downs on the Court	Liu Zemin	Huang Junming, Chen Lijin	January 31, 2021
40	狂风之息	Breath of Fierce Wind	Zhu Haiying	Huang Junming, Chen Lijin	January 31, 2021
41	无法战胜的对手	An Invincible Opponent	Liang Zikai	Zhou Zeju	February 1, 2021
42	迎风而上	Face the Wind	Shi Jianna	Liang Songxian	February 1, 2021
43	一夫当关	One Guards the Hoop	Liu Feng	Lin Jiashu	February 1, 2021
44	绝杀超负荷	Buzzer Beating Overload	Liu Zemin	Chen Xiongbin	February 1, 2021
45	灰太狼的消失	The Disappearance of Wolffy	Liang Zikai	Huang Junming, Chen Lijin	February 2, 2021
46	寻狼记	Finding Wolf	Liu Qingrun	Huang Junming, Chen Lijin	February 2, 2021
47	黑色训练基地	Dark Training Base	Zhu Haiying	Huang Junming, Chen Lijin	February 2, 2021
48	最后一块拼图	The Last Piece of the Puzzle	Liu Feng	Rong Yuqing	February 2, 2021
49	神秘的对手	Mysterious Opponent	Huang Wenji	He Yingqiang	February 3, 2021
50	超越自己	Surpassing Yourself	Shi Jianna	Quan Chao	February 3, 2021
51	狼羊的默契	Tacit Understanding Between Wolves and Goats	Geng Yimiao	Huang Junming, Chen Lijin	February 3, 2021
52	狼族叛徒	Traitor of the Wolves	Liu Qingrun	Huang Junming, Chen Lijin	February 3, 2021
53	紫太狼的阴谋	Zi Tailang's Conspiracy	Liang Zikai	Huang Junming, Chen Lijin	February 4, 2021
54	生死抉择	Choice Between Life and Death	Shi Jianna	He Yingqiang	February 4, 2021
55	逃出生天	Escape	Huang Wenji	Zhou Zeju	February 4, 2021
56	困局	Dilemma	Geng Yimiao	Liang Songxian	February 4, 2021
57	全心全意	Whole-Heartedly	Zhu Haiying	Lin Jiashu	February 5, 2021
58	执念	Obsession	Liu Zemin	Chen Xiongbin	February 5, 2021
59	以一敌众	Individual Versus Team	Liu Feng	Quan Chao	February 5, 2021
60	冠军	Champion	Liu Feng	Rong Yuqing	February 5, 2021

=== Ultimate Battle: The Next Generation ===
No.	Chinese title	English title	Script	Director	Original air date(TV)	Original air date(Web)
1	怪石现世	A Mysterious Rock	Liu Zemin	He Yingqiang; Zhou Zeju	July 9, 2021	July 9, 2021
2	消失的时光	The Disappeared Time	Liu Wei	Lin Jiashu; Liang Songxian; Rong Yuqing	July 9, 2021	July 9, 2021
3	陌生的亲人	Unfamiliar Relatives	Shi Jianna	Quan Chao; Chen Xiongbin	July 9, 2021	July 9, 2021
4	从前的味道	A Tip from the Past	Zhu Haiying	Zhou Zeju	July 9, 2021	July 9, 2021
5	烈焰雄心	Flaming Ambition	Liu Qingrun	Lin Jiashu	July 10, 2021	July 9, 2021
6	不一样的美羊羊	A Different Tibbie	Rong Yuqing	Liang Zikai	July 10, 2021	July 9, 2021
7	最棒的舞台	Shining Stage	Liu Feng	He Yingqiang	July 10, 2021	July 10, 2021
8	黑夜之战	Night Battle	Geng Yimiao	Liang Songxian	July 10, 2021	July 10, 2021
9	寒天来袭	Hantian's Attack	Huang Wenji	Chen Xiongbin	July 11, 2021	July 10, 2021
10	夺卡	Capture the Card	Shi Jianna	Liang Jiaqi; Chen Lijin	July 11, 2021	July 10, 2021
11	提线木偶	String Puppets	Zhu Haiying	Liang Jiaqi; Chen Lijin	July 11, 2021	July 11, 2021
12	一奖难求	Prizes on Mars	Liu Zemin	Liang Jiaqi; Chen Lijin	July 11, 2021	July 11, 2021
13	困斗	Struggling	Liu Feng	Quan Chao	July 12, 2021	July 11, 2021
14	微妙关系	Subtle Relationship	Liang Zikai	Liang Jiaqi; Chen Lijin	July 12, 2021	July 11, 2021
15	游园奇遇	Adventure in the Garden	Shi Jianna	Liang Jiaqi; Chen Lijin	July 12, 2021	July 12, 2021
16	再遇强敌	Encountering a Strong Enemy Again	Liu Wei	Liang Jiaqi; Chen Lijin	July 12, 2021	July 12, 2021
17	爆发	Outbreak	Liu Qingrun	Liang Jiaqi; Chen Lijin	July 13, 2021	July 12, 2021
18	妹妹的眼泪	Sister's Tears	Geng Yimiao	Liang Jiaqi; Chen Lijin	July 13, 2021	July 12, 2021
19	父子	Father and Son	Liu Zemin	Liang Jiaqi; Chen Lijin	July 13, 2021	July 13, 2021
20	矛与盾	Spear and Shield	Liu Wei	He Yingqiang	July 13, 2021	July 13, 2021
21	再见哥哥	Goodbye Brother	Liang Zikai	Zhou Zeju	July 14, 2021	July 13, 2021
22	乌龙相遇	Oolong Encounter	Liu Qingrun	Quan Chao	July 14, 2021	July 13, 2021
23	过去的歌谣	The Ballads of the Past	Zhu Haiying	Liang Jiaqi Chen Lijin	July 14, 2021	July 14, 2021
24	步雷的身份	Bulei's Identity	Liu Wei	Liang Jiaqi Chen Lijin	July 14, 2021	July 14, 2021
25	儿时伙伴	Childhood Buddies	Liu Zemin	Liang Jiaqi Chen Lijin	July 15, 2021	July 14, 2021
26	真亦是假	True but also False	Shi Jianna	Zhou Zeju	July 15, 2021	July 14, 2021
27	再见不是朋友	Bye, But Not Friend Anymore	Liang Zikai	Chen Xiongbin	July 15, 2021	July 15, 2021
28	沉默的机器人	Silent Robot	Zhu Haiying	Liang Songxian	July 15, 2021	July 15, 2021
29	宿敌	Old Enemy	Liu Qingrun	Liang Jiaqi Chen Lijin	July 16, 2021	July 15, 2021
30	残酷的真相	Cruel Truth	Zhu Haiying	Lin Jiashu	July 16, 2021	July 15, 2021
31	改变	Changes	Liu Zemin	Rong Yuqing	July 16, 2021	July 16, 2021
32	付博士归来	Dr. Fu Came Back	Shi Jianna	Liang Jiaqi Chen Lijin	July 16, 2021	July 16, 2021
33	奥力，你好	Hi, Aoli	Liang Zikai	Xiang Jiajun	July 17, 2021	July 16, 2021
34	录音中的告别	Goodbye in the Recording	Liang Zikai	Rong Yuqing	July 17, 2021	July 16, 2021
35	觉醒时刻	Awakening Moment	Zhu Haiying	Liang Jiaqi Chen Lijin	July 17, 2021	July 17, 2021
36	博物馆之夜	Night in the Exhibition	Liu Wei	Liang Jiaqi Chen Lijin	July 17, 2021	July 17, 2021
37	龙潭虎穴	Enemy Base	Liu Qingrun	Liang Jiaqi Chen Lijin	July 18, 2021	July 17, 2021
38	再探虎穴	Go to Enemy Base Again	Liu Wei	Liang Jiaqi Chen Lijin	July 18, 2021	July 17, 2021
39	危险的信号	Dangerous Signal	Zhu Haiying	Chen Xiongbin	July 18, 2021	July 18, 2021
40	唤醒红太狼	Wake Wolnie Up	Shi Jianna	Liang Jiaqi Chen Lijin	July 18, 2021	July 18, 2021
41	强大的意志	Strong Will	Liu Zemin	Liang Jiaqi Chen Lijin	July 19, 2021	July 18, 2021
42	留住时光	Keep the Time	Liu Qingrun	Liang Jiaqi Chen Lijin	July 19, 2021	July 18, 2021
43	意外	Accident	Liang Zikai	Liang Jiaqi Chen Lijin	July 19, 2021	July 19, 2021
44	密室	Chamber of Secrets	Liang Zikai	He Yingqiang	July 19, 2021	July 19, 2021
45	大战壁虎怪	Fight Gecko Monster	Shi Jianna	Liang Jiaqi Chen Lijin	July 20, 2021	July 19, 2021
46	亲情的牵绊	The Bondage Of Family	Liu Zemin	Liang Jiaqi Chen Lijin	July 20, 2021	July 19, 2021
47	最坏的结果	The Worst Result	Liu Qingrun	Liang Jiaqi; Chen Lijin	July 20, 2021	July 20, 2021 July 9 (leak out)
48	末日危机	Doomsday Crisis	Liu Wei	Liang Songxian	July 20, 2021	July 20, 2021 July 9 (leak out)
49	影子任务	Shadow Mission	Shi Jianna	Liang Jiaqi; Chen Lijin	July 21, 2021	July 20, 2021 July 9 (leak out)
50	疯狂的计划	Crazy Planning	Zhu Haiying	Liang Jiaqi; Chen Lijin	July 21, 2021	July 20, 2021 July 9 (leak out)
51	正义的胜利	Victory of Justice	Liang Zikai	Lin Jiashu	July 21, 2021	July 21, 2021 July 9 (leak out)
52	重拾时光	Reminiscence	Liu Zemin	Zhou Zeju	July 21, 2021	July 21, 2021 July 9 (leak out)
53	信任危机	Trust Crisis	Liu Qingrun	Liang Jiaqi; Chen Lijin	July 22, 2021	July 21, 2021 July 9 (leak out)
54	谁是卧底	Who's Undercover	Liu Wei	Quan Chao	July 22, 2021	July 21, 2021 July 9 (leak out)
55	最后一刻	The Last Minute	Zhu Haiying	Chen Xiongbin	July 22, 2021	July 22, 2021
56	曙光与幻灭	Dawn and Disillusion	Liu Qingrun	Quan Chao	July 22, 2021	July 22, 2021
57	潜伏	Latence	Shi Jianna	Liang Jiaqi Chen Lijin	July 23, 2021	July 22, 2021
58	虚假的世界	Fake World	Liu Wei	Rong Yuqing	July 23, 2021	July 22, 2021
59	最大危机	The Biggest Crisis	Liang Zikai	Liang Songxian	July 23, 2021	July 23, 2021 July 22 (leak out)
60	再见	Goodbye	Liu Zemin	Lin Jiashu	July 23, 2021	July 23, 2021 July 22 (leak out)

=== The Great Rescue ===
No.	Chinese title	English title	Script	Director	Original air date(TV)	Original air date(Web)
1	奇猫国危机	Strange Cat Country Crisis	Liang Zikai	Liang Songxian; Zhou Zeju	July 15, 2022	July 15, 2022
2	落如妙狗国	Falling into the wonderful dog country	Shi Jianna	Chen Xiongbin; Xiang Jiajun	July 15, 2022	July 15, 2022
3	一个卧底的诞生	The birth of an undercover agent	Liang Zikai	Liang Jiaqi; Chen Huiyan	July 15, 2022	July 15, 2022
4	消失的囚犯	Missing Prisoner	Zhou Zeju	Geng Yimiao	July 15, 2022	July 15, 2022
5	致命危机	Fatal Crisis	Liu Wei	Liang Jiaqi; Chen Huiyan	July 16, 2022	July 15, 2022
6	想见好难	It's So hard to meet each other	Liu Wei	Liang Jiaqi; Chen Huiyan	July 16, 2022	July 15, 2022
7	逃出矿区	Escape from the mining area	Liu Wei	Gan Jingmin	July 16, 2022	July 16, 2022
8	暴露	Exposed	Liang Jiaqi; Chen Huiyan	Huang Wenji	July 16, 2022	July 16, 2022
9	第二条钥匙	Second Key	Liang Jiaqi; Chen Huiyan	Zhu Haiying	July 17, 2022	July 16, 2022
10	神秘的封印	Mysterious Seal	Liu Qingrun	Chen Xiongbin	July 17, 2022	July 16, 2022
11	风的试炼	The trial of the wind	Liu Zemin	Xiang Jiajun	July 17, 2022	July 17, 2022
12	决战	Decisive battle	Liu Wei	Lin Jiashu	July 17, 2022	July 17, 2022
13	万能合伙人	Universal Partner	Shi Joanna	Liang Jiaqi; Chen Huiyan	July 18, 2022	July 17, 2022
14	烈火焚心	Burning heart	Geng Yimiao	Chen Xiongbin	July 18, 2022	July 17, 2022
15	分別	Respectively	Liu Wei	Liang Jiaqi; Chen Huiyan	July 18, 2022	July 18, 2022
16	家族之道	Family Tradition	Liu Zemin	Liang Jiaqi; Chen Huiyan	July 18, 2022	July 18, 2022
17	追寻传说	Chasing legends	Liu Qingrun	Liang Jiaqi; Chen Huiyan	July 19, 2022	July 18, 2022
18	巧寻金库	Qiao Xun Treasury	Zhu Haiying	Gan Jingmin	July 19, 2022	July 18, 2022
19	灰太狼升职记	Wolffy Promotion story	Huang Wenji	Liang Jiaqi; Chen Huiyan	July 19, 2022	July 19, 2022
20	新人初乍道	Newcomer's first introduction	Liu Feng	Liang Jiaqi; Chen Huiyan	July 19, 2022	July 19, 2022
21	危险新旅程	A dangerous new journey	Liang Zikai	Liang Jiaqi; Chen Huiyan	July 20, 2022	July 19, 2022
22	烈火铠甲	Fire Armor	Shi Jianna	Xiang Jiajun	July 20, 2022	July 19, 2022
23	海上寻路	Way finding at sea	Shi Jianna	Liang Jiaqi; Chen Huiyan	July 20, 2022	July 20, 2022
24	残酷真相	The Cruel Truth	Shi Jianna	Liang Songxian	July 20, 2022	July 20, 2022
25	云之试炼	Trial of the clouds	Shi Jianna	Zhou Zeju	July 21, 2022	July 20, 2022
26	猫狗合作	Cats Dogs Cooperation	Huang Wenji	Liang Jiaqi; Chen Huiyan	July 21, 2022	July 20, 2022
27	相遇	Meet	Liu Qingrun	Liang Jiaqi; Chen Huiyan	July 21, 2022	July 21, 2022
28	亡命火山口	Desperate Volcano Crater	Zhu Haiying	Liang Jiaqi; Chen Huiyan	July 21, 2022	July 21, 2022
29	手所能触及的地方	Wherever the hand can reach	Liu Feng	Liang Songxian	July 22, 2022	July 21, 2022
30	歧途相背	Going Astray	Liang Zikai	Quan Chao; Liang Kunhao	July 22, 2022	July 21, 2022
31	可怕的預感	Terrible Promotion	Zhu Haiying	Liang Jiaqi; Chen Huiyan	July 22, 2022	July 22, 2022
32	暗中傳信	Secret Message	Liu Qingrun	Liang Jiaqi; Chen Huiyan	July 22, 2022	July 22, 2022
33	美麗世界	Beautiful World	Liang Zikai	Zhou Zejun	July 23, 2022	July 22, 2022
34	錯過	Miss	Geng Yimiao	Liang Jiaqi; Chen Huiyan	July 23, 2022	July 22, 2022
35	诡异新城	Weird new city	Liu Wei	Liang Jiaqi; Chen Huiyan	July 23, 2022	July 23, 2022
36	奇怪的雕像	Strange Statue	Zhu Haiying	Liang Jiaqi; Chen Huiyan	July 23, 2022	July 23, 2022
37	破败的希望	Ruined Hope	Liu Qingrun	Liang Jiaqi; Chen Huiyan	July 24, 2022	July 23, 2022
38	落入陷阱	Fall Into Trap	Liu Qingrun	Liang Jiaqi; Chen Huiyan	July 24, 2022	July 23, 2022
39	超级奇兽	Super Strange Beast	Liu Zemin	Liang Jiaqi; Chen Huiyan	July 24, 2022	July 24, 2022
40	两方齐动	Both Sides Move Together	Liu Zemin	Liang Jiaqi; Chen Huiyan	July 24, 2022	July 24, 2022
41	另一個自己	Another Me	Liang Zikai	Chen Xiongbin	July 25, 2022	July 24, 2022
42	幻境音符	Fantasy notes	Zhu Haiying	Liang Jiaqi; Chen Huiyan	July 25, 2022	July 24, 2022
43	午夜钟声	Midnight Chime	Geng Yimiao	Liang Jiaqi; Chen Huiyan	July 25, 2022	July 25, 2022
44	黎明之前	Before The Dawn	Liu Zemin	Liang Jiaqi; Chen Huiyan	July 25, 2022	July 25, 2022
45	三根金骨头	Three Golden Bones	Liang Zikai	Liang Jiaqi; Chen Huiyan	July 26, 2022	July 25, 2022
46	寻找封印	Looking For Seal	Liu Qingrun	Liang Jiaqi; Chen Huiyan	July 26, 2022	July 25, 2022
47	沉沦时刻	Moment of Sinking	Liu Wei	Gan Jingmin	July 26, 2022	July 26, 2022
48	再起波澜	Make Waves Again	Liu Wei	Xiang Jiajun	July 26, 2022	July 26, 2022
49	风起云涌	Turbulent Weather	Liu Zemin	Liang Songxian	July 27, 2022	July 26, 2022
50	黑暗军团	Dark Army	Zhou Zeju	Zhu Haiying	July 27, 2022	July 26, 2022
51	深藏地底的往事	The past hidden underground	Geng Yimiao	Liang Jiaqi; Chen Huiyan	July 27, 2022	July 27, 2022
52	陷阱	Trap	Zhu Haiying	Liang Jiaqi; Chen Huiyan	July 27, 2022	July 27, 2022
53	第五个将军	The third general	Zhu Haiying	Gan Jingmin	July 28, 2022	July 27, 2022
54	水晶塔之歌	Song of the crystal water	Geng Yimiao	Quan Chai	July 28, 2022	July 27, 2022
55	暗黑的他	Dark Him	Liu Zemin	Rong Yuqing	July 28, 2022	July 28, 2022
56	终极反派	Ultimate Villain	Liu Wei	Liang Jiaqi; Chen Huiyan	July 28, 2022	July 28, 2022
57	重回故地	Return to the old place	Liu Qingrun	Liang Jiaqi; Chen Huiyan	July 29, 2022	July 28, 2022
58	最后一个封印	The last seal	Liu Qingrun	Lin Jiashu	July 29, 2022	July 28, 2022
59	黑暗深渊	Dark abyss	Liang Zikai	Rong Yuqing; Liang Kunhao	July 29, 2022	July 29, 2022 (leak out)
60	在黑暗中迎接光明	Welcome light in darkness	Liu Zemin	Xiang Jiajun; Zhou Zeju	July 29, 2022	July 29, 2022 (leak out)

=== The Season Towns ===
No.	Chinese title	English title	Script	Director	Original air date(TV)	Original air date(Web)
1	被选中的勇者	The chosen brave	Liu Feng	Liang Songxian	January 6, 2023	January 6, 2023
2	考验开始	Test begin	Shi Jianna	Yang Yi	January 6, 2023	January 6, 2023
3	黄金搭档	Golden partner	Xiang Jiajun	Huang Wenji	January 6, 2023	January 6, 2023
4	通关	Clearance	Xiang Jiajun	Huang Wenji	January 6, 2023	January 6, 2023
5	你好 怪物城	Hello Monster City	Chen Xiongbin	Huang Wenji	January 7, 2023	January 6, 2023
6	喜羊羊怎么了	Wesley What's Wrong	Liu Feng	Cai Yuying	January 7, 2023	January 6, 2023
7	春花城危机	Spring Flower City Crisis	Shi Jianna	Chen Huiyan; He Yingqiang	January 7, 2023	January 7, 2023
8	怪物森林	Monster forest	Huang Wenji	Chen Huiyan; He Yingqiang	January 7, 2023	January 7, 2023
9	英王来袭	Shadow King is coming	Liu Feng	Chen Huiyan; He Yingqiang	January 8, 2023	January 7, 2023
10	争夺赛	Scramble	Zhou Zeju	Huang Wenji	January 8, 2023	January 7, 2023
11	破蛋而出	Break out of the egg	Liu Feng	Chen Huiyan; He Yingqiang	January 8, 2023	January 8, 2023
12	断剑剑士	Broken Sword Swordsmanship	Shi Jianna	Chen Huiyan; He Yingqiang	January 8, 2023	January 8, 2023
13	石怪危机	Stone Monster Crisis	Huang Wenji	Quan Chao	January 9, 2023	January 8, 2023
14	勇者之剑	Sword of the brave	Lin Feng	Lin Jiashu	January 9, 2023	January 8, 2023
15	拯救公主	Save the princess	Shi Jianna	Chen Huiyan; He Yingqiang	January 9, 2023	January 9, 2023
16	决战	Decisive battle	Liu Feng	Nie Haofan	January 9, 2023	January 9, 2023
17	双日之城	City of two days	Huang Wenji	Chen Huiyan; He Yingqiang	January 10, 2023	January 9, 2023
18	传说中的扶桑树	The legend of the hibiscus tree	Shi Jianna	Chen Huiyan; He Yingqiang	January 10, 2023	January 9, 2023
19	爬上天空	Climb into the sky	Shi Jianna	Gan Jingmin	January 10, 2023	January 10, 2023
20	千里弓	Thousand Miles Bow	Liu Feng	Chen Huiyan; He Yingqiang	January 10, 2023	January 10, 2023
21	元素考验	Ordeal of the Elements	Huang Wenji	Chen Xiongbin	January 11, 2023	January 10, 2023
22	蜕变的灰太狼	Metamorphosis Wolffy	Huang Wenji	Quan Chao	January 11, 2023	January 10, 2023
23	地下对战	Underground Battle	Shi Jianna	Chen Huiyan; He Yingqiang	January 11, 2023	January 11, 2023
24	探秘太阳家	Exploring the Sun Home	Liu Feng	Chen Huiyan; He Yingqiang	January 11, 2023	January 11, 2023
25	寻日鸟笼	Sun seeking birdcage	Huang Wenji	Chen Huiyan; He Yingqiang	January 12, 2023	January 11, 2023
26	绝地游戏	Jedi Games	Liu Feng	Chen Huiyan; He Yingqiang	January 12, 2023	January 11, 2023
27	舞动奇迹	Strictly Come Dancing	Shi Jianna	Zhou Zeju	January 12, 2023	January 12, 2023
28	初入丰秋城	First time entering Fengqiu City	Liu Wei	Gan Jingmin	January 12, 2023	January 12, 2023
29	换盾	Change shield	Shi Jianna	Chen Huiyan; He Yingqiang	January 13, 2023	January 12, 2023
30	追逐游戏	Chasing game	Liu Feng	Chen Huiyan; He Yingqiang	January 13, 2023	January 12, 2023
31	智取盾牌	Outwit the shield	Zhou Zeju	Huang Wenji	January 13, 2023	January 13, 2023
32	影王的祝福	Shadow King's Blessing	Liu Zemin	Chen Huiyan; He Yingqiang	January 13, 2023	January 13, 2023
33	地瓜风波	Sweet potato controversy	Liu Wei	Chen Huiyan; He Yingqiang	January 14, 2023	January 13, 2023
34	阔别重逢	Reunion after a long absence	Liu Feng	Liang Songxian	January 14, 2023	January 13, 2023
35	危机	Crisis	Huang Wenji	Gang Jingmin	January 14, 2023	January 14, 2023
36	生命的吟唱	Chant of life	Liu Zemin	Quan Chao	January 14, 2023	January 14, 2023
37	寒冬乍到	Winter has arrived	Liu Zemin	Chen Huiyan; He Yingqiang	January 15, 2023	January 14, 2023
38	众里寻他	Looking for him in the crowd	Shi Jianna	Chen Huiyan; He Yingqiang	January 15, 2023	January 14, 2023
39	城主归来	The city lord returns	Huang Wenji	Chen Huiyan; He Yingqiang	January 15, 2023	January 15, 2023
40	任性的城主	The willful city lord	Huang Wenji	Chen Huiyan; He Yingqiang	January 15, 2023	January 15, 2023
41	逃离	Get away	Shi Jianna	Chen Huiyan; He Yingqiang	January 16, 2023	January 15, 2023
42	净化材料	Purification materials	Geng Yimiao	Chen Huiyan; He Yingqiang	January 16, 2023	January 15, 2023
43	幡然醒悟	Suddenly wake up	Liu Qingrun	Chen Huiyan; He Yingqiang	January 16, 2023	January 16, 2023
44	再见了影王	Goodbye Shadow King	Huang Wenji	Nie Haofan; Chen Huiyan; He Yingqiang	January 16, 2023	January 16, 2023
45	不信任务城	Crisis of distrust	Shi Jianna	Liang Songxian	January 17, 2023	January 16, 2023
46	又到怪物城	Back to Monster City	Liu Feng	Cai Yuying	January 17, 2023	January 16, 2023
47	我一定会回来的	I will definitely come back	Liu Feng	Chen Huiyan; He Yingqiang	January 17, 2023	January 17, 2023
48	喜羊羊 你变了	Wesley You Change it	Huang Wenji	Chen Huiyan; He Yingqiang	January 17, 2023	January 17, 2023
49	再战春花城	Fight again at Chunhua City	Shi Jianna	Chen Huiyan; He Yingqiang	January 18, 2023	January 17, 2023
50	太阳去哪儿	Where does the sun go	Liu Feng	Chen Huiyan; He Yingqiang	January 18, 2023	January 17, 2023
51	失控的太阳	Runaway sun	Huang Wenji	Chen Huiyan; He Yingqiang	January 18, 2023	January 18, 2023
52	重回丰秋城	Return to Fengqiu City	Shi Jianna	Gan Jingmin	January 18, 2023	January 18, 2023
53	危险沼泽	Dangerous Swamp	Liang Zikai	Quan Chao	January 19, 2023	January 18, 2023
54	再临寒冬	Winter comes again	Liu Qingrun	Xiang Jiajun; Chen Huiyan; He Yingqiang	January 19, 2023	January 18, 2023
55	雪怪来袭	Snow monster is coming	Liu Zemin	Zhou Zeju	January 19, 2023	January 19, 2023
56	久违的记忆	Long lost memory	Liu Wei	Cai Yuying	January 19, 2023	January 19, 2023
57	往事无人知晓	No one knows the past	Zhu Haiying	Liang Songxian	January 20, 2023	January 19, 2023
58	对立	Opposition	Huang Wenji	Chen Xiongbin	January 20, 2023	January 19, 2023
59	团结之战	Battle for unity	Shi Jianna	Xiang Jiajun	January 20, 2023	January 20, 2023 (leak out)
60	真正的勇者	True brave	Lin Jiashu	Liu Feng	January 20, 2023	January 20, 2023 (leak out)

=== Mysterious Ocean Adventure ===
No.	Chinese title	English title	Script	Director	Original air date(TV)	Original air date(Web)
1	羊村跑了	Goat Village Runs Away	ShiJianna	Yang Yi	July 6, 2023	July 6, 2023
2	危险重重	Dangerous	Liang Zikai	Liang Songxian	July 6, 2023	July 6, 2023
3	逃离漩涡岛	Escape from Whirlpool Island	Liu Qingrun	Zhou Zeju	July 6, 2023	July 6, 2023
4	希望	Hope	Liu Feng	Cai Yuying; Quan Chao	July 6, 2023	July 6, 2023
5	封锁漩涡眼	Block the Whirlpool eye	Zhu Haiying	Gang Jingmin; Nie Haofan	July 7, 2023	July 6, 2023
6	决心	Determination	Liu Feng	Chen Xiongbin	July 7, 2023	July 6, 2023
7	再见漩涡岛	Goodbye Whirlpool eye	Zhu Haiying	He Yingqiang	July 7, 2023	July 7, 2023
8	欢迎来到新狼堡	Welcome to the New Wolf's Castle	Liu Feng	Hu Dan; Rong Yuqing	July 7, 2023	July 7, 2023
9	难辨西东	Difficult to distinguish west from east	Liang Zikai	Gan Jingmin	July 8, 2023	July 7, 2023
10	懒羊羊争夺赛	Paddi's Scramble	Shi Jianna	Hu Dan; Rong Yuqing	July 8, 2023	July 7, 2023
11	消失的项链	Missing bracelet	Zhu Haiying	Hu Dan; Rong Yuqing	July 8, 2023	July 8, 2023
12	兄弟决裂	Brothers break up	Shi Jianna	Hu Dan; Rong Yuqing	July 8, 2023	July 8, 2023
13	亲情的奇迹	The Miracle of Family Love	Liang Zikai	Cai Yuying	July 9, 2023	July 8, 2023
14	暴风雨之夜	Stormy night	Zhu Haiying	Hu Dan; Rong Yuqing	July 9, 2023	July 8, 2023
15	荒岛求生	Desert Island Survival	Liu Qingrun	Hu Dan; Rong Yuqing	July 9, 2023	July 9, 2023
16	寻宝奇旅	Treasure Hunt	Liu Feng	Hu Dan; Rong Yuqing	July 9, 2023	July 9, 2023
17	红太狼失踪	Wolnie's Missing	Shi Jianna	Hu Dan; Rong Yuqing	July 10, 2023	July 9, 2023
18	更大的目标	Bigger goals	Liang Zikai	Hu Dan; Rong Yuqing	July 10, 2023	July 9, 2023
19	调虎离山	Tune the tiger away from the mountain	Zeng Xinran	Chen Xiongbin	July 10, 2023	July 10, 2023
20	黑夜中的光辉	Radiance in the dark night	Liang Zikai	Hu Dan; Rong Yuqing	July 10, 2023	July 10, 2023
21	洗心革面	Change one's mind	Shi Jianna	Yang Yi	July 11, 2023	July 10, 2023
22	病毒	Virus	Liu Qingrun	Hu Dan; Rong Yuqing	July 11, 2023	July 10, 2023
23	临危受命	Take orders in times of danger	Liu Feng	Hu Dan; Rong Yuqing	July 11, 2023	July 11, 2023
24	初到美丽岛	First time arriving at Beautiful Island	Zhu Haiying	Hu Dan; Rong Yuqing	July 11, 2023	July 11, 2023
25	幕后黑手	The man behind the scenes	Zeng Xinran	Hu Dan; Rong Yuqing	July 12, 2023	July 11, 2023
26	惊魂一夜	A night of terror	Liu Feng	Hu Dan; Rong Yuqing	July 12, 2023	July 11, 2023
27	寻草惊心	Looking for grass and startling	Shi Jianna	Zhou Zeju	July 12, 2023	July 12, 2023
28	绿色巨人	Green giant	Liang Zikai	He Yingqiang	July 12, 2023	July 12, 2023
29	草王之战	Battle of Grass King	Liu Qingrun	Liang Songxian	July 13, 2023	July 12, 2023
30	暗流涌动	Undercurrent	Zhu Haiying	Hu Dan; Rong Yuqing	July 13, 2023	July 12, 2023
31	是谁在恶作剧	Who is playing a prank	Shi Jiana	Hu Dan; Rong Yuqing	July 13, 2023	July 13, 2023
32	传说中的人鱼	Legendary mermaid	Zeng Xinran	Hu Dan; Rong Yuqing	July 13, 2023	July 13, 2023
33	人鱼保卫战	Mermaid defense battle	Zhu Haiying	Gan Jingmin	July 14, 2023	July 13, 2023
34	谜一样的岛屿	Mysterious island	Liu Feng	Hu Dan; Rong Yuqing	July 14, 2023	July 13, 2023
35	首领的过去	The leader's past	Liang Zikai	Hu Dan; Rong Yuqing	July 14, 2023	July 14, 2023
36	如临大敌	Like a formidable enemy	Liang Zikai	Hu Dan; Rong Yuqing	July 14, 2023	July 14, 2023
37	作茧自缚	Trapped in a cocoon	Zeng Xinran	Hu Dan; Rong Yuqing	July 15, 2023	July 14, 2023
38	冰海危机	Ice crisis	Shi Jianna	Cai Yuying	July 15, 2023	July 14, 2023
39	冰山追击战	Iceberg pursuit	Zhu Haiying	He Yingqiang	July 15, 2023	July 15, 2023
40	冰山岛奇遇	Adventure on Iceberg Island	Liu Feng	Hu Dan; Rong Yuqing	July 15, 2023	July 15, 2023
41	喷火怪的故事	The story of the fire-breathing monster	Liu Feng	Hu Dan; Rong Yuqing	July 16, 2023	July 15, 2023
42	带走了玄龟	Took away the black turtle	Shi Jianna	Gan Jingmin	July 16, 2023	July 15, 2023
43	破冰	Break the ice	Liang Zikai	Yang Yi	July 16, 2023	July 16, 2023
44	暴风雪之行	Blizzard trip	Zeng Xinran	Hu Dan; Rong Yuqing	July 16, 2023	July 16, 2023
45	要遵守的约定	Agreement to abide by	Zhu Haiying	Hu Dan; Rong Yuqing	July 17, 2023	July 16, 2023
46	熟悉的特训	Familiar training	Zhu Haiying	Hu Dan; Rong Yuqing	July 17, 2023	July 16, 2023
47	神秘的弓	Mysterious bow	Zeng Xinran	Hu Dan; Rong Yuqing	July 17, 2023	July 17, 2023
48	迷失	Lost	Liang Zikai	Hu Dan; Rong Yuqing	July 17, 2023	July 17, 2023
49	绝地生机	Last Jedi	Liu Feng	Liang Songxian	July 18, 2023	July 17, 2023
50	昨日重现	Yesterday reappears	Zhu Haiying	Liang Songxian	July 18, 2023	July 17, 2023
51	灰太狼的小心愿	Wolffy's be careful	Zeng Xinran	Hu Dan; Rong Yuqing	July 18, 2023	July 18, 2023
52	和平谈判	Peace talks	Shi Jianna	Hu Dan; Rong Yuqing	July 18, 2023	July 18, 2023
53	左右为难	Dilemma	Shi Jianna	Hu Dan; Rong Yuqing	July 19, 2023	July 18, 2023
54	危急时刻	Emergency moment	Liang Zikai	Zhou Zeju	July 19, 2023	July 18, 2023
55	陷落的家园	Fallen home	Liu Feng	Chen Xiongbin	July 19, 2023	July 19, 2023
56	神秘的迷雾岛	Mysterious Kirishima	Zhu Haiying	Cai Yuying	July 19, 2023	July 19, 2023
57	很久很久以前	Long long ago	Liang Zikai	Zhou Zeju	July 20, 2023	July 19, 2023
58	守护之战	Battle of Guardians	Zeng Xinran	Liang Songxian	July 20, 2023	July 19, 2023
59	逆转终局	Reversal of the outcome	Liu Feng	Chen Xiongbin	July 20, 2023	July 20, 2023 (leak out)
60	星芒	Starburst	Yang Yi	Shi Jianna	July 20, 2023	July 20, 2023 (leak out)

=== Explore Wolffy's Mind ===
No.	Chinese title	English title	Script	Director	Original air date(TV)	Original air date(Web)
1	遇袭	Ambushed	Zeng Xinran	Huang Weijia	January 19, 2024	January 19, 2024
2	向大脑出发	Set Off to the Brain	Liu Feng	Yang Yi	January 19, 2024	January 19, 2024
3	欢迎来到想象区	Welcome to the Imagination Zone	Zhu Haiying, Zeng Xinran	Zhao Jiaxin	January 19, 2024	January 19, 2024
4	陌生的狼堡	The Unfamiliar Wolf Castle	Shi Jianna	Cai Yuying, He Yingqiang	January 19, 2024	January 19, 2024
5	玩具疑案	Mysterious Case of Toys	Liang Zikai	Cai Yuying, He Yingqiang	January 20, 2024	January 19, 2024
6	真假老师	Real or Fake Teacher	Zeng Xinran	Chen Xiongbin	January 20, 2024	January 19, 2024
7	热血球拍	Passionate Racket	Liang Zikai	Zhou Zeju	January 20, 2024	January 20, 2024
8	不一样的小羊们	Different Goats	Liu Feng	Cai Yuying, He Yingqiang	January 20, 2024	January 20, 2024
9	现身	Appearance	Shi Jianna	Liang Songxian	January 21, 2024	January 20, 2024
10	真相	The Truth	Zhu Haiying, Liang Zikai	Zhang Hanwen, Huang Meiping, Zhou Zeju	January 21, 2024	January 20, 2024
11	心如死灰	Heart as Dead Ashes	Liang Zikai	Liang Song Xian, Wen Rujie	January 21, 2024	January 21, 2024
12	想象大作战	The Great War of Imagination	Liang Zikai	Chen Xiongbin, Chen Dong	January 21, 2024	January 21, 2024
13	帮倒忙	Do a Disservice	Liu Feng	Cai Yuying, He Yingqiang	January 22, 2024	January 21, 2024
14	失手被擒	Captured Due to a Blunder	Liu Feng	Cai Yuying, He Yingqiang	January 22, 2024	January 21, 2024
15	坚持的尾巴	The tail that sticks	Zhu Haiying, Liu Feng	Cai Yuying, He Yingqiang	January 22, 2024	January 22, 2024
16	劳累的躯干	Tired torso	Shi Jianna	Cai Yuying, He Yingqiang	January 22, 2024	January 22, 2024
17	重要的手脚	Important hands and feet	Shi Jianna	Cai Yuying, He Yingqiang	January 23, 2024	January 22, 2024
18	慵懒的脖子	Lazy neck	Liang Zikai	Cai Yuying, He Yingqiang	January 23, 2024	January 22, 2024
19	失踪的总队长	The missing captain	Zeng Xinran	Cai Yuying, He Yingqiang	January 23, 2024	January 23, 2024
20	完全动起来	Fully moving	Zeng Xinran	Cai Yuying, He Yingqiang	January 23, 2024	January 23, 2024
21	最伟大的作品	Greatest Works	Zhu Haiying, Shi Jianna	Cai Yuying, He Yingqiang	January 24, 2024	January 23, 2024
22	难以捉摸的爸爸	The Elusive Dad	Xu Zhe	Cai Yuying, He Yingqiang	January 24, 2024	January 23, 2024
23	谁是卧底	Who is undercover	Zhu Haiying, Xu Zhe	Cai Yuying, He Yingqiang	January 24, 2024	January 24, 2024
24	密室逃脱	Escape Room	Liang Zikai	Cai Yuying, He Yingqiang	January 24, 2024	January 24, 2024
25	厨房考验	Kitchen Test	Liu Feng	Cai Yuying, He Yingqiang	January 25, 2024	January 24, 2024
26	华丽衣帽间	Gorgeous cloakroom		Cai Yuying, He Yingqiang	January 25, 2024	January 24, 2024
27	花房大冲关	Flower room challenge	Shi Jianna	Cai Yuying, He Yingqiang	January 25, 2024	January 25, 2024
28	各司其职	Each one has his own job	Liang Zikai	Cai Yuying, He Yingqiang	January 25, 2024	January 25, 2024
29	神秘袭击	Mysterious attack	Liu Feng	Yangyi	January 25, 2024	January 25, 2024
30	脑士兵的一天	A Day in the Life of a Brain Soldier	Xu Zhe	Cai Yuying, He Yingqiang	January 25, 2024	January 25, 2024
31	患难见真情	A friend in need is a friend indeed	Xu Zhe	Cai Yuying, He Yingqiang	January 25, 2024	January 26, 2024
32	情绪大爆炸	Emotional explosion	Shi Jianna	Cai Yuying, He Yingqiang	January 25, 2024	January 26, 2024
33	热血与沮丧	Passion and frustration	Shi Jianna	Cai Yuying, He Yingqiang	January 26, 2024	January 26, 2024
34	偷袭	Sneak attack	Zeng Xinran	Cai Yuying, He Yingqiang	January 26, 2024	January 26, 2024
35	开心最重要	Happiness is the most important thing	Zeng Xinran	Cai Yuying, He Yingqiang	January 26, 2024	January 27, 2024
36	惊慌失措	Panic	Xu Zhe	Cai Yuying, He Yingqiang	January 26, 2024	January 27, 2024
37	成功的柴太狼	Successfully Chai Wolffy	Liu Feng	Cai Yuying, He Yingqiang	January 27, 2024	January 27, 2024
38	快乐时代	Happy times	Liu Feng	Huang Weijia, Chen Dong	January 27, 2024	January 27, 2024
39	彻底恢复	Complete recovery	Liang Zikai	Yang Yi, Liang Zhi Bing	January 27, 2024	January 28, 2024
40	风波又起	The storm is coming again	Xu Zhe	Cai Yuying, He Yingqiang	January 27, 2024	January 28, 2024
41	入梦	Dream	Liu Feng	Cai Yuying, He Yingqiang	January 28, 2024	January 28, 2024
42	灰太狼王子	Wolffy's Prince	Liang Zikai	Zhao Jiaxin	January 28, 2024	January 28, 2024
43	小小灰太狼	Little Wolffy	Shi Jianna	Cai Yuying, He Yingqiang	January 28, 2024	January 29, 2024
44	不愿醒来的梦	A dream I don't want to wake up from	Zeng Xinran	Liang Songxian	January 28, 2024	January 29, 2024
45	狼族专家	Wolf Expert	Shi Jianna	Cai Yuying, He Yingqiang	January 30, 2024	January 29, 2024
46	士兵灰太狼	Soldier Wolffy's	Liu Feng	Cai Yuying, He Yingqiang	January 30, 2024	January 29, 2024
47	再见列车长	Goodbye, conductor	Zeng Xinran	Cai Yuying, He Yingqiang	January 30, 2024	January 30, 2024
48	她的伙伴	Her partner	Liang Zikai	Zhao Jiaxin	January 30, 2024	January 30, 2024
49	影子伙伴	Shadow Partner	Huang Yang	Huang Weijia	January 31, 2024	January 30, 2024
50	浓雾中的恐惧	Fear in the fog	Zeng Xinran	Cai Yuying, He Yingqiang	January 31, 2024	January 30, 2024
51	奇怪的脑士兵	Strange brain soldier	Shi Jianna	Cai Yuying, He Yingqiang	January 31, 2024	January 31, 2024
52	朋友	Friend	Xu Zhe	Cai Yuying, He Yingqiang	January 31, 2024	January 31, 2024
53	智斗巨狼	Fighting the giant wolf	Liu Feng	Huang Meiping, Zhou Zeju	February 1, 2024	January 31, 2024
54	记忆碎片	Memory pieces	Liang Zikai	Chen Xiongbin	February 1, 2024	January 31, 2024
55	启动	Start up	Shi Jianna	Huang Weijia	February 1, 2024	February 1, 2024
56	提线木偶	Marionette	Liu Feng	Zhao Jia Xin	February 1, 2024	February 1, 2024
57	潜行虎穴	Into the Tiger's Lair	Shi Jianna	Huang Meipin, Zhou Zeju	February 2, 2024	February 1, 2024
58	勇往直前	Moving forward	Liang Zikai	Liang Songxian	February 2, 2024	February 1, 2024
59	曙光	Dawn	Zeng Xinran	Chen Xiongbin	February 2, 2024	February 2, 2024
60	再见	Goodbye	Xu Zhe	Yang Yi	February 2, 2024	February 2, 2024

=== Crazy Hubs ===
No.	Chinese title	English title	Original air date(TV)	Original air date(Web)
1	神奇旅程去哪里	Where to Go in the Amazing Journey	July 5, 2024	July 5, 2024
2	奇异森林旅程	A Journey in Peculiar Forest	July 5, 2024	July 5, 2024
3	疯狂的小鱼	Crazy Little Fish	July 5, 2024	July 5, 2024
4	开训第一天	The First Day of Training	July 5, 2024	July 5, 2024
5	失控的大牛	Daniu Who Lost Control	July 6, 2024	July 5, 2024
6	我的发明不对劲	There is Something Wrong with My Invention	July 6, 2024	July 5, 2024
7	风雨后的彩虹	Rainbow After Storm	July 6, 2024	July 6, 2024
8	体验发明社	Experience the Invention Club	July 6, 2024	July 6, 2024
9	百变吹风筒	Versatile Hairdryer	July 7, 2024	July 6, 2024
10	头套下的真面目	True Colors Under the Hood	July 7, 2024	July 6, 2024
11	我们的小测试	Our Quizzes	July 7, 2024	July 7, 2024
12	我的飞行伙伴	My Flying Buddy	July 7, 2024	July 7, 2024
13	飞翔姐妹情	The Sisterhood of Flying	July 8, 2024	July 7, 2024
14	斤斤计教的巾巾	The Fussy Jinjin	July 8, 2024	July 7, 2024
15	美食大作战	War of Food	July 8, 2024	July 8, 2024
16	奇怪的新生	Strange New Member	July 8, 2024	July 8, 2024
17	催眠连连看	Hypnosis Concentration	July 9, 2024	July 8, 2024
18	前进的动力	The Motivation of Going Forward	July 9, 2024	July 8, 2024
19	失败者的光荣	The Honor of the Loser	July 9, 2024	July 9, 2024
20	潜入发明社	Infiltrate the Invention Club	July 9, 2024	July 9, 2024
21	危险的好朋友	Good Friends of Danger	July 10, 2024	July 9, 2024
22	谁是美羊羊	Who is Tibbie	July 10, 2024	July 9, 2024
23	神秘新教练	Mysterious New Coach	July 10, 2024	July 10, 2024
24	消融的隔阂	Melting Barriers	July 10, 2024	July 10, 2024
25	失控的速度	Out of Control Speed	July 11, 2024	July 10, 2024
26	水源保卫战	Water Source Protection Battle	July 11, 2024	July 10, 2024
27	一起跳舞吧	Let's Dance Together	July 11, 2024	July 11, 2024
28	今天我是小灰灰	Today I Am Willie's	July 11, 2024	July 11, 2024
29	调皮的粒粒	Naughty Grains	July 12, 2024	July 11, 2024
30	游乐时间	Play Time	July 12, 2024	July 11, 2024
31	月光凝案	Moonlight Condensation Case	July 12, 2024	July 12, 2024
32	四朵金花	Four Golden Flowers	July 12, 2024	July 12, 2024
33	在劫难逃	Doomed	July 13, 2024	July 12, 2024
34	采摘竞赛	Picking Competition	July 13, 2024	July 12, 2024
35	全面胜利	Total Victory	July 13, 2024	July 13, 2024
36	变形记	Metamorphosis	July 13, 2024	July 13, 2024
37	蛋炒饭的故事	The Story of Egg Fried Rice	July 14, 2024	July 13, 2024
38	你追我躲	You Chase Me and Hide	July 14, 2024	July 13, 2024
39	不能笑的比赛	A Game That Cannot Be Laughed At	July 14, 2024	July 14, 2024
40	不一样的考验	A Different Test	July 14, 2024	July 14, 2024
41	隐秘的真相	The Hidden Truth	July 15, 2024	July 14, 2024
42	爱的偏方	Love Remedies	July 15, 2024	July 14, 2024
43	来历不明的小可爱	Little Cutie of Unknown Origin	July 15, 2024	July 15, 2024
44	一闪一闪亮晶晶	Twinkle, Twinkle Little Star	July 15, 2024	July 15, 2024
45	疯狂对抗赛	Crazy Match	July 16, 2024	July 15, 2024
46	小豆王子	Prince Xiaodou	July 16, 2024	July 15, 2024
47	初学元素法	Elemental Method for Beginners	July 16, 2024	July 16, 2024
48	电与光的碰撞	The Collision of Electricity and Light	July 16, 2024	July 16, 2024
49	健身新潮流	New Fitness Trends	July 17, 2024	July 16, 2024
50	呼啦呼啦腌青瓜	Hula Hula Pickled Cucumber	July 17, 2024	July 16, 2024
51	爱帮忙的指南	Love Helpful Guide	July 17, 2024	July 17, 2024
52	元素对决	Elemental Showdown	July 17, 2024	July 17, 2024
53	风暴来临	The Storm Is Coming	July 18, 2024	July 17, 2024
54	别再离开我	Don't Leave Me Again	July 18, 2024	July 17, 2024
55	消失的指南	Disappearing Guide	July 18, 2024	July 18, 2024
56	开启未来通道	Open the Future Channel	July 18, 2024	July 18, 2024
57	守护未来	Protect the Future	July 19, 2024	July 18, 2024
58	觉醒	Awakening	July 19, 2024	July 18, 2024
59	光巨人冲啊！	Light Giant Go!	July 19, 2024	July 19, 2024
60	守护者集结	Defenders Guardians Gather	July 19, 2024	July 19, 2024

=== Martial World Rescue ===
No.	Chinese title	English title	Original air date(TV)	Original air date(Web)
1	麒麟盛会起风云	The Qilin Banquet Sparks Turmoil	January 10, 2025	January 10, 2025
2	浮云遮月冤难明	Clouds Veil the Moon, Injustice Stays Concealed	January 10, 2025	January 10, 2025
3	神兵初现显奇威	The Divine Weapon Emerges, Unleashing Power	January 10, 2025	January 10, 2025
4	别有人间行路难	Elsewhere, the World Holds Even Harder Paths to Tread	January 10, 2025	January 10, 2025
5	笑傲群英剑巍峨	Laughing Proudly Among Heroes, Sword Standing Majestic	January 11, 2025	January 10, 2025
6	天下英雄谁敌手	Who Among Heroes of the World Can Be a Worthy Opponent?	January 11, 2025	January 10, 2025
7	终宵纷扰曙光迎	Through a Night of Disruption, the Dawn Breaks	January 11, 2025	January 11, 2025
8	缘君八方风云涌	Because of You, Turmoils Surge in All Directions	January 11, 2025	January 11, 2025
9	麒麟乍现天地动	The Qilin Appears, Shaking the Heavens and Earth	January 12, 2025	January 11, 2025
10	山重水复疑无路	Mountains and Rivers Repeated, Seems No Road Ahead	January 12, 2025	January 11, 2025
11	飘蓬夜宿雨声急	Wanderers Resting at the Night, Rain Echoes Urgently	January 12, 2025	January 12, 2025
12	千回百转破迷踪	Through Countless Twists, Breaking the Mystery	January 12, 2025	January 12, 2025
13	热闹门庭浮剑影	At the Bustling Doorstep, Sword Shadows Hover	January 13, 2025	January 12, 2025
14	断水门中断肠人	In the Duanshui Sect, There Is a Broken Heart	January 13, 2025	January 12, 2025
15	落魄天涯飘萍叶	Across the World Drift the Forsaken Duckweed Leaves	January 13, 2025	January 13, 2025
16	我寄人间雪满头	Left Behind in This Mortal World, I Bear Snow-White Hair	January 13, 2025	January 13, 2025
17	阵法传人无觅寻	Nowhere to Seek the Heir to the Zhenfa Sect	January 14, 2025	January 13, 2025
18	孤碑苦楚话凄凉	A Lone Gravestone Speaks of Sorrow and Desolation	January 14, 2025	January 13, 2025
19	群龙无首引风波	Without a Chief, the Sect Falls into Turmoil	January 14, 2025	January 14, 2025
20	十里地毯阵法藏	The Ten-Li Carpet Hides a Zhenfa Circle	January 14, 2025	January 14, 2025
21	改头换面巧瞒天	Changing Appearances to Deceive the Heavens	January 15, 2025	January 14, 2025
22	一鸣惊人露锋芒	A Single Cry Shocks All, Revealing Talent	January 15, 2025	January 14, 2025
23	相顾无言泪千行	Facing Each Other in Silence, Tears Flow in Thousands	January 15, 2025	January 15, 2025
24	游园惊梦夜难醒	A Startling Dream in the Manor, a Night Hard to Wake	January 15, 2025	January 15, 2025
25	义胆豪情斩不公	Righteous Courage and Heroic Valor Cleave Apart Injustice	January 16, 2025	January 15, 2025
26	身陷囹圄待天明	Trapped in Prison, Waiting for the Dawn	January 16, 2025	January 15, 2025
27	夜半诡事一场惊	The Midnight Mystery Turns Out to Be a False Alarm	January 16, 2025	January 16, 2025
28	柳暗花明又一村	Beyond the Willow Shades and Bright Flowers, Another Village Appears	January 16, 2025	January 16, 2025
29	妙计巧施云雾散	With a Clever Strategy, the Mist Disperses	January 17, 2025	January 16, 2025
30	鸟入樊笼终脱困	Birds in the Cage Eventually Escape	January 17, 2025	January 16, 2025
31	海上明月共潮生	Yueming's Move Surges as the Tide Rises, Like the Moon Over the Sea	January 17, 2025	January 17, 2025
32	少时春风一梦中	Triumphs of Youth Fade Like a Dream	January 17, 2025	January 17, 2025
33	围城内外进退难	Those Inside the Walls Long to Leave, Those Outside Struggle to Enter	January 18, 2025	January 17, 2025
34	险路独行夜逢光	Alone on the Treacherous Path, Hanguang Appears at the Darkest Moment	January 18, 2025	January 17, 2025
35	寒风一叶为谁鸣	The Lone Leaf Plays Its Tune in the Cold Wind, for Whose Sake?	January 18, 2025	January 18, 2025
36	破岳开山天地裂	Breaking Through the Mountains, Splitting Heaven and Earth	January 18, 2025	January 18, 2025
37	铁面之下见人心	Beneath Tiemian's Iron Mask Lies His True Heart	January 19, 2025	January 18, 2025
38	似水流年叹悲欢	Fleeting Years Like Water, Sighs of Joy and Sorrow	January 19, 2025	January 18, 2025
39	患难见真释前嫌	In Adversity, True Feelings are Revealed, Past Grievances are Forgotten	January 19, 2025	January 19, 2025
40	冲冠雷霆霹雳鸣	With Determination, the Thunder Roars and Lightning Strikes	January 19, 2025	January 19, 2025
41	迷雾重重真难明	In the Dense Fog, Truth is Hard to Discern	January 20, 2025	January 19, 2025
42	一叶扁舟清波去	A Single Leaf Boat Drifts Away on Clear Waters	January 20, 2025	January 19, 2025
43	草荒竹枯春欲暮	Fields Overgrown with Weeds, Bamboo Withered, Spring Nears Its End	January 20, 2025	January 20, 2025
44	故人才见便开眉	Only When Old Friends Meet, Do Eyebrows Raise in Joy	January 20, 2025	January 20, 2025
45	独探虎穴乾坤定	Venturing Alone Into the Tiger's Den, the Fate of the World Is Set	January 21, 2025	January 20, 2025
46	麒麟断水乱人心	The Qilin Leaves the Hearts of the Duanshui Sect in Disarray	January 21, 2025	January 20, 2025
47	云天一决显其真	A Duel Between Shouyun and Aotian Reveals the Truly Capable One	January 21, 2025	January 21, 2025
48	风波虽停夜难明	Though the Storm Calms, the Night Remains Unclear	January 21, 2025	January 21, 2025
49	听君一言天将晓	Hearing Your Words, Dawn Breaks	January 22, 2025	January 21, 2025
50	凶影藏锋现原形	The Hidden Blade Reveals Its True Form	January 22, 2025	January 21, 2025
51	一剑光寒万丈芒	The Saint's Sword Radiates a Frosted Glow, Reaching Boundlessly	January 22, 2025	January 22, 2025
52	风雨潇潇孤剑凉	Amidst Howling Wind and Rain, the Lone Sword Chills	January 22, 2025	January 22, 2025
53	悲欢离合总无情	Joy and Sorrow, Union and Parting, Are Always Merciless	January 23, 2025	January 22, 2025
54	与君一别再无期	Bidding You Farewell, No Reunion in Sight	January 23, 2025	January 22, 2025
55	战云密布北冥宫	Battle Clouds Gather Over the Beiming Palace	January 23, 2025	January 23, 2025
56	莫道浮云终蔽日	Do Not Say That Floating Clouds Will Forever Block the Sun	January 23, 2025	January 23, 2025
57	豪杰聚义贯长虹	Heroes Assemble, Righteousness Spaning the Long Rainbow	January 24, 2025	January 23, 2025
58	飘飘天地一沙鸥	Drifting Like a Seagull Between Heaven and Earth	January 24, 2025	January 23, 2025
59	看君只手补天裂	Behold, with One Hand You Mend the Cracks in Heaven	January 24, 2025	January 24, 2025
60	少年游	The Young Wanderers	January 24, 2025	January 24, 2025

=== New Wild Cosmos ===
No.	Chinese title	English title	Original air date(TV)	Original air date(Web)
1	危机乍现	Crisis Emerges	July 4, 2025	July 4, 2025
2	神奇的布拉拉	The Amazing Bulala	July 4, 2025	July 4, 2025
3	祸起	Disaster Begins	July 4, 2025	July 4, 2025
4	跑啊跑	Run, Run!	July 4, 2025	July 4, 2025
5	激斗巨兽	Fierce Battle Against the Giant Beast	July 5, 2025	July 4, 2025
6	危险的荆棘林	The Perilous Thorn Forest	July 5, 2025	July 4, 2025
7	勇闯迷宫	Braving the Maze	July 5, 2025	July 5, 2025
8	森林游击战	Forest Guerrilla Battle	July 5, 2025	July 5, 2025
9	布拉拉国王	The Bulala King	July 6, 2025	July 5, 2025
10	猝不及防	Caught Off Guard	July 6, 2025	July 5, 2025
11	心结	The Heart Knot	July 6, 2025	July 6, 2025
12	能量碎片	Energy Pieces	July 6, 2025	July 6, 2025
13	闪耀的金布拉拉	Shining Golden Bulala	July 7, 2025	July 6, 2025
14	硝烟弥漫	Smoke and Fire All Around	July 7, 2025	July 6, 2025
15	惹上麻烦了	Trouble's Brewing	July 7, 2025	July 7, 2025
16	沙影	Sand Shadow	July 7, 2025	July 7, 2025
17	在路上	On the Road	July 8, 2025	July 7, 2025
18	风沙摧驿站	Sandstorm Destroys the Inn	July 8, 2025	July 7, 2025
19	浑水摸鱼	Fish in Troubled Waters	July 8, 2025	July 8, 2025
20	合作	Cooperation	July 8, 2025	July 8, 2025
21	留下的决定	The Decision to Stay	July 9, 2025	July 8, 2025
22	新队友	New Teammate	July 9, 2025	July 8, 2025
23	无可救药	Beyond Redemption	July 9, 2025	July 9, 2025
24	沙尘暴	Sandstorm	July 9, 2025	July 9, 2025
25	故人	Old Acquaintance	July 10, 2025	July 9, 2025
26	沙漠追击线	Desert Pursuit Line	July 10, 2025	July 9, 2025
27	真相	Truth	July 10, 2025	July 10, 2025
28	封存的记忆	Sealed Memories	July 10, 2025	July 10, 2025
29	水珠	Water Droplet	July 11, 2025	July 10, 2025
30	新的旅途	New Journey	July 11, 2025	July 10, 2025
31	奇袭计划	Surprise Attack Plan	July 11, 2025	July 11, 2025
32	慢羊羊的反击	Slowy's Counterattack	July 11, 2025	July 11, 2025
33	初到西兰树	First Arrival at Xilan Tree	July 12, 2025	July 11, 2025
34	最爱青草蛋糕	Favorite Grass Cake	July 12, 2025	July 11, 2025
35	不速之客	Uninvited Guest	July 12, 2025	July 12, 2025
36	淤泥族	Mud Tribe	July 12, 2025	July 12, 2025
37	为我而开的花	Flowers That Bloom For Me	July 13, 2025	July 12, 2025
38	最后的决心	Final Resolution	July 13, 2025	July 12, 2025
39	你是谁	Who Are You	July 13, 2025	July 13, 2025
40	虫洞	Wormhole	July 13, 2025	July 13, 2025
41	鲜花洞	The Flower Cave	July 14, 2025	July 13, 2025
42	神秘的庄园	The Mysterious Manor	July 14, 2025	July 13, 2025
43	抓到你了	Got You	July 14, 2025	July 14, 2025
44	七彩蒲公英	The Colorful Dandelion	July 14, 2025	July 14, 2025
45	最后的花火	The Last Flower Spark	July 15, 2025	July 14, 2025
46	绝望与希望	Despair and Hope	July 15, 2025	July 14, 2025
47	偏要往上爬	Climbing Up against All Odds	July 15, 2025	July 15, 2025
48	善良的力量	Power of Kindness	July 15, 2025	July 15, 2025
49	无尽深渊	The Buttomless Abyss	July 16, 2025	July 15, 2025
50	重生	Rebirth	July 16, 2025	July 15, 2025
51	第二朋友	The Second Friend	July 16, 2025	July 16, 2025
52	逆天营救	Rescue against Fate	July 16, 2025	July 16, 2025
53	来吧新世界	Come New World	July 17, 2025	July 16, 2025
54	潜行	Infiltration	July 17, 2025	July 16, 2025
55	重拾友谊	Friendship Rekindled	July 17, 2025	July 17, 2025
56	绝地	The Last Stand	July 17, 2025	July 17, 2025
57	宇宙吸收计划	Comsic Absortption Plan	July 18, 2025	July 17, 2025
58	还有我	I'm Still There	July 18, 2025	July 17, 2025
59	大家的力量	The Power of Everyone	July 18, 2025	July 18, 2025
60	绘出新未来	Painting a New Future	July 18, 2025	July 18, 2025
