= List of animated television series of 2005 =

A list of animated television series first aired in 2005.

Animated television series first aired in 2005
Title	Seasons	Episodes	Country	Year	Original Channel	Technique
3 Kingdoms Super Fun	2	52	Thailand	2005–06	Channel 7	
12 oz. Mouse	3	31	United States	2005–20	Adult Swim, Adult Swim Video (webisode)	Flash
A.T.O.M.	2	52	France	2005–07	Toon Disney	Traditional/CGI
Acadieman	3	12+	Canada	2005–09	Rogers TV, TV5	Flash
The Adventures of Bottle Top Bill and His Best Friend Corky	4	104	Australia	2005–09	ABC2	Stop-Motion
Alien Racers	1	26	Canada, United States	2005–06	4Kids TV	CGI
Alux's Grotto	1	24	Mexico	2005–07	Sipse TV	Flash
American Dad!	21	388	United States	2005–present	Fox (2005–2014; 2026-present), TBS (2014–2025)	Traditional (seasons 1–3), Flash (season 4–present)
American Dragon: Jake Long	2	52	United States	2005–07	Disney Channel	Traditional
Anabel	2	26	Brazil	2005–11	Nickelodeon (season 1), TV Rá-Tim-Bum (season 2)	Flash
Auto-B-Good	2	63	United States	2005–06	Syndication	CGI
Avatar: The Last Airbender	3	61	United States	2005–08	Nickelodeon	Traditional
BB3B	1	13	United Kingdom	2005	CBBC	Traditional
Bebidu	1	13	Germany	2005	KI.KA	Flash
Being Ian	3	63	Canada	2005–08	YTV	Flash
Ben 10 (2005)	4	52	United States	2005–08	Cartoon Network	Traditional
Bin Weevils	1	12	United Kingdom	2005	Nickelodeon	Flash
Bird Bath	1	65	United Kingdom	2005	Five	CGI
The Boondocks	4	55	United States	2005–14	Adult Swim	Traditional
Boule et Bill	1	104	France; Canada	2005	TF1	Traditional
Brady's Beasts	1	26	Canada, France, United Kingdom	2005–06	YTV, TF1	Traditional
Bratz	2	40	United States	2005–08	4Kids TV	CGI
Bromwell High	1	13	Canada, United Kingdom	2005	Channel 4 (UK), The Detour On Teletoon (Canada)	Flash
The Buzz on Maggie	1	21	United States	2005–06	Disney Channel	Flash
Camp Lazlo	5	61	United States	2005–08	Cartoon Network	Traditional
Carl²	4	65	Canada	2005–11	Teletoon	Flash
Catscratch	1	20	United States	2005–07	Nickelodeon	Traditional
Charlie and Lola	3	78	United Kingdom	2005–08	CBeebies	Flash
Class of the Titans	2	52	Canada	2005–08	Teletoon	Traditional
Classical Baby	1	6	United States	2005	HBO Family	Flash
Coconut Fred's Fruit Salad Island!	2	13	Canada, United States	2005–06	Kids' WB	Flash
Commander Safeguard	1	12	Pakistan	2005		CGI
Danger Rangers	1	16	United States	2005–06	PBS Kids	Traditional
Delilah & Julius	2	52	Canada	2005–08	Teletoon	Flash
Descontrol			Mexico	2005	Azteca 7	Traditional
Diego and Glot	2	20	Chile	2005–09	Canal 13	Traditional
Dive Olly Dive!	2	52	Australia, Ireland, Germany, United States	2005–11	Seven Network, Animania HD, KI.KA	CGI
The Dog and Cat News	2	26	Australia	2005–06	ABC	CGI
The Dreaming Girl	1	26	China	2005–06	CCTV	Traditional
Ebb and Flo	1	26	Germany, United Kingdom	2005	Five	Traditional
Elias: The Little Rescue Boat	3	91	Norway	2005–15	TV 2, NRK Super	CGI
Elfy Food	1	7	United Kingdom	2005	Cartoon Network	Traditional
Faireez	1	52	Australia, Canada	2005	Network Ten	Flash
Ein Fall für Freunde	2	52	Germany	2005–12	Das Erste	Traditional
Farhat: The Prince of the Desert	2	52	Italy	2005–09	Rai Uno	Traditional
Fernanda	1	13	Cuba	2005	Cubavisión	Flash
Fifi and the Flowertots	3	117	United Kingdom	2005–10	Five, Nick Jr.	Stop motion
Firehouse Tales	1	26	United States	2005–06	Cartoon Network	Traditional/CGI
Fudêncio e Seus Amigos	6	179	Brazil	2005–11	MTV Brasil	Flash
Funpak	1	13	Canada	2005	YTV	Flash/CGI/Stop-motion/Traditional
G.I. Joe: Sigma 6	2	26	United States, Japan	2005–06	4Kids TV	Traditional
G4's Late Night Peep Show	2	35	United States	2005–06	G4	Flash/CGI/Traditional
Gerald McBoing-Boing	2	26	Canada, United States	2005–07	Cartoon Network (US), Teletoon (Canada)	Flash
Get Ed	1	26	Canada, United States	2005–06	Toon Disney	CGI
GG Bond	17	1,116	China, United States (seasons 17–present)	2005–present		CGI
Gift	1	26	France	2005	France 2	CGI
Go Player	2	52	China	2005–09	CCTV-1	Traditional
Go, Diego, Go!	5	80	United States	2005–11	Nickelodeon	Traditional
Gordon the Garden Gnome	1	52	Australia, United Kingdom	2005–06	CBeebies (UK), ABC Kids (Australia)	Traditional
Harry and His Bucket Full of Dinosaurs	2	52	Canada, United Kingdom	2005–08	Teletoon (Canada), Treehouse TV (Canada), Playhouse Disney (UK)	Traditional
Heaven Pig		208	China	2005	CCTV-1	Traditional
Hopeless Pictures	1	9	United States	2005	IFC	Flash
Howie & Landau			China	2005		Traditional/CGI
The Invisible Man	1	26	France, Italy, Spain	2005	M6	Traditional
Jack's Big Music Show	1	26	United States	2005–08	Nick Jr.	CGI/Live-action
Jammers	1	30	Israel	2005–06	BabyTV	Flash
Jane and the Dragon	1	26	Canada, New Zealand	2005–06	YTV (Canada), ABC (Australia)	CGI
Jang Geum's Dream	2	52	South Korea	2005–07	MBC	Traditional
Johnny Test (2005)	6	117	Canada, United States	2005–14	Kids' WB (US), Cartoon Network (US), Teletoon (Canada)	Traditional (Season 1), Flash (Season 2–6)
King Arthur's Disasters	2	26	United Kingdom	2005–06	CITV	Flash
Kiri the Clown (2005)	1	65	France	2005	France 2	CGI
Krypto the Superdog	2	39	United States	2005–06	Cartoon Network	Traditional
Laku noć, Hrvatska		252	Croatia	2005–08	Nova TV, OTV	Flash
Legend of the Dragon	2	39	Germany, United Kingdom	2005–08	CBBC	Traditional
The Life and Times of Juniper Lee	3	40	United States	2005–07	Cartoon Network	Traditional
Little Einsteins	2	67	United States	2005–09	Playhouse Disney	Flash/CGI
Loonatics Unleashed	2	26	United States	2005–07	Kids' WB	Traditional
Maple Shorts	1	14	Canada	2005–06	CBC Television	Flash
Mask Man	1	39	South Korea	2005–06	KBS2	Traditional
Mischief City	1	26	Canada	2005	YTV	Flash
Miss BG	2	52	Canada, France	2005–08	TVOntario	CGI
Missy Milly	1	13	Germany	2005–06	Super RTL	Traditional
Moby Dick and the Secret of Mu	1	26	France	2005–06	TF1	Traditional
Monster Allergy	2	52	France, Germany, Italy	2005–09	Toon Disney	Traditional
Moral Orel	3	43	United States	2005–08	Adult Swim	Stop motion
Mountain of Gems		87	Russia	2005–present	Channel One	Traditional/Flash/Stop motion
Muffin the Mule	1	26	United Kingdom	2005	CBeebies	Traditional
My Gym Partner's a Monkey	4	56	United States	2005–08	Cartoon Network	Traditional
New Captain Scarlet	2	26	United Kingdom	2005	ITV	CGI
Pitt & Kantrop	2	39	France, United Kingdom	2005	CBBC	Traditional
Pixcodelics	1	65	Brazil	2005	Cartoon Network	CGI
Planet Sketch	2	39	Canada, United Kingdom	2005–07	CITV	Flash/CGI
Pleasant Goat and Big Big Wolf	45	3,272	China	2005–present		Flash
Pocoyo	6	331	Spain, United Kingdom (seasons 1–2)	2005–present	CITV (UK), Clan (Spain)	CGI
Popetown	1	10	France, United Kingdom	2005	C4	Traditional
Pulentos	2	22	Chile	2005–09	Canal 13	CGI
Razzledazzle	1	20	United Kingdom	2005	CBeebies	CGI/Live-action
Ribert and Robert's Wonderworld	5	78	United States	2005–08	PBS Kids	CGI/Live-action
Robot Chicken	11	220	United States	2005–present	Adult Swim	Stop motion
Robotboy	2	52	France, United Kingdom, Luxembourg (season 1)	2005–08	Cartoon Network, France 3	Traditional
Roobarb and Custard Too		39	United Kingdom	2005	Five	Flash
Rugrats Pre-School Daze	1	4	United States	2005	Direct-to-video (2005), Nickelodeon (2008)	Traditional
Shadow Fighter	1	26	South Korea	2005–06	MBC	CGI
Shane's Kindergarten Countdown	1	10	United States	2005	Playhouse Disney	Flash
SkyEye		500	China	2005–present		Traditional/CGI
Skyland	2	26	Canada, France	2005–07	Teletoon (Canada), France 2 (France)	CGI
Sons of Butcher	2	26	Canada	2005–07	The Detour On Teletoon	Flash
Squidbillies	13	132	United States	2005–21	Adult Swim	Flash
Station X	1	13	Canada	2005	The Detour On Teletoon	Traditional
Street Football	5	130	France, Italy	2005–present	France 3, Rai 2, Okoo	Traditional
Summerton Mill	2	26	United Kingdom	2005	CBeebies	Stop motion
Sunday Pants	1	5	United States	2005	Cartoon Network	CGI/Flash/Traditional
SuperNews!	2	67	United States	2005–10	Current TV	Flash
Those Scurvy Rascals	1	26	United Kingdom	2005–06	Nickelodeon	CGI
Time Warp Trio	1	26	Canada, United States	2005–06	Discovery Kids	Flash
Tít và Mít	1	10	Vietnam	2005	VTV3	Traditional
Tom und das Erdbeermarmeladebrot mit Honig	4	52	Germany	2005–12	KI.KA	Flash
Toopy and Binoo	2	32	Canada	2005–06	Treehouse TV	Flash
Trollz	1	27	United States	2005	DIC Kids Network	Traditional
Tupu	1	26	France, Canada	2005	France 3 (France), Disney Channel (France), ZDF (Germany), Super Écran (Canada)	Traditional
Vitaminix	1	104	Spain	2005–07	Nickelodeon	Flash
Walter and Tandoori	2	104	Canada, France	2005–10	TV5	Traditional
Wapos Bay		34	Canada	2005–10	APTN	Stop motion
Weebles		10	United States	2005	Direct-to-video	CGI
Willo the Wisp (2005)	1	26	United Kingdom	2005	Playhouse Disney	Traditional
Wonder Showzen	2	16	United States	2005–06	MTV2	Flash/Traditional/Live-action
The X's	1	20	United States	2005–06	Nickelodeon	Traditional
Yakari	5	156	Belgium, France	2005–17	France 3	Traditional
Yummy Mummy	1	26	Canada	2005–06	Life Network, Discovery Health Channel	Live-action/Flash/CGI
The Zimmer Twins	3	106	Canada	2005–08	Teletoon	Flash
Zombie Hotel	1	26	France, Ireland	2005	France 3	Traditional
The Zula Patrol	3	52	United States	2005–08	PBS Kids	CGI

Anime television series first aired in 2005
Title	Episodes	Country	Year	Original Channel	Technique
Absolute Boy	26	Japan	2005		Traditional
Ah My Buddha	12	Japan	2005		Traditional
Ah! My Goddess	24	Japan	2005		Traditional
Air	13	Japan	2005		Traditional
Akagi	26	Japan	2005–06		Traditional
Akahori Gedou Hour Rabuge	13	Japan	2005		Traditional
Angel Heart	50	Japan	2005–06		Traditional
Animal Yokochō	51	Japan	2005–06		Traditional
Aria the Animation	13	Japan	2005		Traditional
Basilisk	24	Japan	2005		Traditional
Battle B-Daman: Fire Spirits!	51	Japan	2005		Traditional
Beet the Vandel Buster: Excellion	25	Japan	2005–06		Traditional
Best Student Council	26	Japan	2005		Traditional
Black Cat	24	Japan	2005–06		Traditional
Blood+	50	Japan	2005–06		Traditional
Bludgeoning Angel Dokuro-chan	4	Japan	2005		Traditional
Buzzer Beater	13	Japan	2005		Traditional
Canvas 2: Niji Iro no Sketch	24	Japan	2005–06		Traditional
Capeta	52	Japan	2005–06		Traditional
Cluster Edge	25	Japan	2005–06		Traditional
Comic Party Revolution	13	Japan	2005		Traditional
D.I.C.E.	40	Japan	2005		Traditional
Da Capo: Second Season	26	Japan	2005		Traditional
Damekko Dōbutsu	26	Japan	2005		Traditional
Doraemon	1,465+	Japan	2005–present		Traditional
Elemental Gelade	26	Japan	2005		Traditional
Emma – A Victorian Romance	12	Japan	2005		Traditional
Eureka Seven	50	Japan	2005–06		Traditional
Eyeshield 21	145	Japan	2005–08		Traditional
Fighting Beauty Wulong	50	Japan	2005–06		Traditional
Full Metal Panic! The Second Raid	13	Japan	2005		Traditional
Futakoi Alternative	13	Japan	2005		Traditional
Futari wa Pretty Cure Max Heart	47	Japan	2005–06		Traditional
Gag Manga Biyori	12	Japan	2005		Traditional
Gaiking: Legend of Daiku-Maryu	39	Japan	2005–06		Traditional
Gallery Fake	37	Japan	2005		Traditional
Genesis of Aquarion	26	Japan	2005		Traditional
Ginban Kaleidoscope	12	Japan	2005		Traditional
Ginga Densetsu Weed	26	Japan	2005–06		Traditional
Glass Mask (2005)	51	Japan	2005–06		Traditional
Gun X Sword	26	Japan	2005		Traditional
Gunparade Orchestra	24	Japan	2005–06		Traditional
Guyver: The Bioboosted Armor	26	Japan	2005–06		Traditional
Happy Seven	13	Japan	2005		Traditional
He Is My Master	12	Japan	2005		Traditional
Hell Girl	26	Japan	2005–06		Traditional
Honey and Clover	24	Japan	2005		Traditional
Idaten Jump	52	Japan	2005–06		Traditional
Immortal Grand Prix	26	Japan	2005–06		Traditional
Izumo: Takeki Tsurugi no Senki	12	Japan	2005		Traditional
Jinki: Extend	12	Japan	2005		Traditional
Kamichu!	12	Japan	2005		Traditional
Karin	24	Japan	2005–06		Traditional
The King of Braves GaoGaiGar Final Grand Glorious Gathering	12	Japan	2005		Traditional
Koi Koi Seven	13	Japan	2005		Traditional
Kotencotenco	52	Japan	2005–06		Traditional
Lamune	12	Japan	2005		Traditional
The Law of Ueki	51	Japan	2005–06		Traditional
Lime-iro Ryūkitan X	13	Japan	2005		Traditional
Loveless	12	Japan	2005		Traditional
Magical Canan	13	Japan	2005		Traditional
Magical Girl Lyrical Nanoha A's	13	Japan	2005		Traditional
Mahoraba ~Heartful Days~	26	Japan	2005		Traditional
Majime ni Fumajime Kaiketsu Zorori	97	Japan	2005–07		Traditional
MÄR	102	Japan	2005–07		Traditional
MegaMan NT Warrior Beast	25	Japan	2005–06		Traditional
Mix Master	39	Japan, South Korea	2005–06	KBS2	Traditional
Moeyo Ken	13	Japan	2005		Traditional
Mushiking: The King of Beetles	52	Japan	2005–06		Traditional
Mushishi	26	Japan	2005–06		Traditional
My-Otome	26	Japan	2005–06		Traditional
Negima!	26	Japan	2005		Traditional
Noein: To Your Other Self	24	Japan	2005–06		Traditional
Oku-sama wa Joshi Kōsei	13	Japan	2005		Traditional
Oku-sama wa Mahō Shōjo: Bewitched Agnes	13	Japan	2005		Traditional
Onegai My Melody	52	Japan	2005–06		Traditional
Pandalian	26	Japan	2005		Traditional
Pani Poni Dash!	26	Japan	2005		Traditional
Paradise Kiss	12	Japan	2005		Traditional
Patalliro Saiyuki!	26	Japan	2005	Kids Station	Traditional
Peach Girl	25	Japan	2005		Traditional
Petopeto-san	13	Japan	2005		Traditional
Play Ball	26	Japan	2005–06		Traditional
Rozen Maiden: Träumend	12	Japan	2005–06		Traditional
Shakugan no Shana	24	Japan	2005–06		Traditional
Shuffle!	24	Japan	2005–06		Traditional
The Snow Queen	36	Japan	2005–06		Traditional
SoltyRei	24	Japan	2005–06		Traditional
Speed Grapher	24	Japan	2005		Traditional
Starship Operators	13	Japan	2005		Traditional
Strawberry 100%	12	Japan	2005		Traditional
Strawberry Marshmallow	12	Japan	2005		Traditional
Sugar Sugar Rune	51	Japan	2005–06		Traditional
Sukisho	13	Japan	2005		Traditional
Suzuka	26	Japan	2005		Traditional
Taiko no Tatsujin	26	Japan	2005–06	Kids Station	Stop motion
Tide-Line Blue	13	Japan	2005		Traditional
To Heart 2	13	Japan	2005		Traditional
Transformers: Cybertron	52	Japan	2005		Traditional/CGI
Trinity Blood	24	Japan	2005		Traditional
Tsubasa: Reservoir Chronicle	52	Japan	2005–06		Traditional
Twin Princess of Wonder Planet	51	Japan	2005–06		Traditional
Ultimate Girls	12	Japan	2005		Traditional
The World of Golden Eggs	26	Japan	2005–06		CGI
Xenosaga: The Animation	12	Japan	2005		Traditional
Zoids: Genesis	50	Japan	2005–06		Traditional

== See also ==
- List of animated feature films of 2005
- List of Japanese animation television series of 2005
