= List of Emma episodes =

This is an episode listing of the Japanese animated TV series Emma - A Victorian Romance (英國戀物語エマ, Eikoku Koi Monogatari Emma) and its sequel, Emma - A Victorian Romance: Second Act.

== Emma - A Victorian Romance ==
The first season of Emma was produced by Studio Pierrot and Tokyo Broadcasting System, Inc. (TBS).

No.	Title	Original release date	English Airdate
1	"The Gift"; Transliteration: "Okurimono" (Japanese: 贈り物)	2 April 2005	23 September 2010
William Jones meets the maid Emma at his old governess', Kelly Stownar's house. William falls in love with Emma and looks for opportunities to meet her again, wanting to give her a present.
2	"Two Worlds"; Transliteration: "Futatsu no Sekai" (Japanese: 二つの世界)	9 April 2005	24 September 2010
William meets Eleanor as she debuts in society at a ball he is forced to attend by his father. When he buys a parasol for Emma later on when together with Eleanor, Grace, and Vivi, Eleanor misunderstands, thinking the parasol is for her.
3	"The Confession"; Transliteration: "Kokuhaku" (Japanese: 告白)	16 April 2005	27 September 2010
Prince Hakim comes to visit William in London. On an elephant ride through town, William becomes motion sick and ends up recuperating at Kelly Stownar's house. Hakim also falls in love with Emma, and confesses to her.
4	"Mudie's"; Transliteration: "Myūdīzu" (Japanese: ミューディーズ)	23 April 2005	28 September 2010
Hakim and William meet Emma while browsing the erotic literature section at Mudie's. William coaches Eleanor in tennis.
5	"Dinner Party"; Transliteration: "Bansan-kai" (Japanese: 晩餐会)	30 April 2005	29 September 2010
Kelly is fixing up her apartment in preparation for visitors, but ends up having dinner with Emma and Al as the Knoxes had to cancel their appointment.
6	"The Visit"; Transliteration: "Houmon" (Japanese: 訪問)	7 May 2005	30 September 2010
As William continues to court Emma, his father decided to pay Mrs. Stownar an appreciation visit together with William.
7	"Crystal Palace"; Transliteration: "Suisyo-kyu" (Japanese: 水晶宮)	14 May 2005	1 October 2010
Emma takes time off from work and goes to visit the Crystal Palace together with William. They end up missing the closing time and have to stay at the pavilion overnight.
8	"Pocketwatch"; Transliteration: "Tokei" (Japanese: 時計)	21 May 2005	4 October 2010
Emma takes Kelly's pocket watch for repair. However, when she returns, Kelly has already died. William tells his father about Emma and meets with strong opposition.
9	"Alone"; Transliteration: "Hitori" (Japanese: ひとり)	28 May 2005	5 October 2010
Kelly Stownar's funeral is being held, and Emma reminiscences about their life together while cleaning up the apartment. Meanwhile, William attends a dinner party with Eleanor.
10	"Missing One Another"; Transliteration: "Sure chigai" (Japanese: すれ違い)	4 June 2005	6 October 2010
Emma comes to visit William at his estate, but he is out searching for her. Just as she is about to leave, William returns, and the situation turns into a scandal with his father.
11	"Past"; Transliteration: "Kako" (Japanese: 過去)	11 June 2005	7 October 2010
William's father is scheming with Mrs. Campbell to set up William and Eleanor. Meanwhile, William goes to look for Emma and ends up hearing her childhood story from Al.
12	"Lily of the Valley"; Transliteration: "Suzuran" (Japanese: スズラン)	18 June 2005	8 October 2010
William leaves a surprised Eleanor behind to go to the train station and stop Emma from leaving. However, he arrives too late.

== Emma - A Victorian Romance: Second Act ==
The second season of Emma was produced by Ajia-do Animation Works. It details events that take place shortly after the first series concludes. Note that the following English episode names are not official translations.

No.	Title	Original release date
0	"Intermission"; Transliteration: "Maku ai" (Japanese: 幕間)	Not Broadcast
Recap episode included with "manga volume 8 Special Edition (Japan)"
1	"A New House"; Transliteration: "Atarashii ie" (Japanese: 新しい家)	16 April 2007
Eleanor, still in love with William, runs into him at an outdoor party. Meanwhile Emma, who has taken up work at the a large countryside estate belonging to the Mölders family, immigrants from Germany, is being falsely accused of theft.
2	"Moonlight"; Transliteration: "Gekkou" (Japanese: 月光)	23 April 2007
One month later, William visits the Crystal Palace with Eleanor and his siblings, but memories from his last visit together with Emma prevent him from concentrating on Eleanor. Meanwhile, the Mölders celebrate Ilse's birthday. That evening, the servants of the estate have a private feast.
3	"Cool Rain"; Transliteration: "Ryoū" (Japanese: 涼雨)	30 April 2007
Dorothea Mölders visits her friend Mrs. Trollope together with Emma. William, scolded by his father for neglecting his duties, attends a charity performance of Romeo and Juliet in Grace's stead, not knowing that Eleanor will be there too. Eleanor chases after William.
4	"Courtship"; Transliteration: "Kyūkon" (Japanese: 求婚)	7 May 2007
The Molders plan on visiting London and intend on taking Emma. Emma tries to get out of it. William begins to court Eleanor. Eleanor's fiery, older sister, Monica, comes to London for vacation.
5	"Embrace"; Transliteration: "Houyou" (Japanese: 抱擁)	14 May 2007
Mrs. Molders and Emma are out shopping when they come across Mrs. Trollope. Mrs. Molders insists on Emma attending Mrs. Trollope to an engagement party for her eldest son. Meanwhile, William and Eleanor plan their engagement party. Emma and Mrs. Trollope attend the engagement party for her son, who turns out to be William, Mrs. Trollope's real name being Mrs. Jones; her maiden being Hartwick. When Emma, not wearing her glasses, finds out whats going on, she faints in front of William.
6	"Success and Loss"; Transliteration: "Seikou to Soushitsu" (Japanese: 成功と喪失)	21 May 2007
After spending the night with William, Emma flees to Mrs. Jones first thing in the morning and tells her the whole story. William chases after her but arrives just too late. He decides to cancel the engagement with Eleanor. Aurelia and Richard Jones' past is seen, revealing that they had separated due to Aurelia's failing health when William was a boy.
7	"Evening Waves"; Transliteration: "Yuunami" (Japanese: 夕波)	28 May 2007
Emma, full of regrets, runs off from the Mölders household after overhearing the other maids gossiping about the canceled engagement, and Hans is sent to bring her back.
8	"Whereabouts"; Transliteration: "Ibasho" (Japanese: 居場所)	4 June 2007
Emma runs away from Hans, and he follows Emma to the place she was born. They spend the night together. Eleanor goes to William house with Prince Hakim, and Eleanor cries and runs away after talking to William. After returning home, Emma and Hans are called, and Hans covers up for Emma.
9	"Resolution"; Transliteration: "Kakugo" (Japanese: 覚悟)	11 June 2007
Mrs. Trollope visits Mrs. Mölders and asks about Emma. Eleanor tries to forget about William. Viscount Campbell formally annul the engagement between William and Eleanor. William visits his mother, Mrs. Trollope, and asks where Emma is. William finds Emma and ask her to marry him.
10	"By the Window"; Transliteration: "Madobe" (Japanese: 窓辺)	18 June 2007
William tries hard to save his father's company. William visits Emma and sends her letters. Emma does not meet him or open his letters. Hans brings Emma to town on an off day. Hans ask Emma to marry him. William visits Emma again. He talks to Emma through the windows of her neighbor. He wants Emma to meet him in Crystal Palace in one week's time to give him her answer.
11	"Time"; Transliteration: "Kouin" (Japanese: 光陰)	25 June 2007
Viscount Campbell pushes on the investors, making the Jones Company face hardships. However, William tries to find more investors for the sake of his family. After Emma visits her former employer, Kelly Stowner's house, she finds that Mölders house is on fire and rushes back.
12	"Flower"; Transliteration: "Hana" (Japanese: 花)	2 July 2007
Emma tries to save the lace handkerchief which William gives to her but is stopped by Hans. William continues to find more investors. Finally, he collects enough money for the company. He rushes to the Crystal Palace, and Emma runs to the Crystal Palace after realizing her true affections and desires. Again, William asks Emma to marry him, of which she accepts and they hug. Several years later, they have been living happily and are blessed with four children; two daughters and two sons. In a voice-over, Emma tells her late employer that had she not met her, none of her happiness would have been possible. Al is at Kelly Stowner's grave, wondering if Kelly had known about this from the start. Kelly's spirit then assures him "As I said: She'll be just fine."

== See also ==
Emma - A Victorian Romance
