= List of Best Student Council episodes =

A list of episodes for the anime series Best Student Council.

No.	Title	Original release date
1	"Dear, Mr. Poppit"; Transliteration: "Haikei, Misutā Popitto" (Japanese: 拝啓、ミスター·ポピット)	April 6, 2005
Rino Rando, with her puppet friend Pucchan, enrolls in Miyagami Academy, and immediately joins the Best Student Council.
2	"Gushing Youth"; Transliteration: "Hotobashiru Seishun" (Japanese: ほとばしる青春)	April 13, 2005
Rino gets a welcoming party by her fellow members of the Best Student Council.
3	"Payapaya in the Best Dorms"; Transliteration: "Gokujō-ryō de Paya Paya" (Japanese: 極上寮でパヤパヤ)	April 20, 2005
Kanade is now living in Rino's Dorm room, causing scandalous rumors to spread around the school.
4	"A Brilliantly Clear-Headed Way"; Transliteration: "Subarashiku Saeta Yarikata" (Japanese: 素晴らしく冴えたやり方)	April 27, 2005
Rino becomes a temporary member of the Assault Squad and patrols with Kaori, who has been jealous of Rino's time with Kanade.
5	"A Beautiful Battle"; Transliteration: "Karei naru Taiketsu" (Japanese: 華麗なる対決)	May 4, 2005
For an entire month, either the Covert Squad or the Assault Squad will not have a budget. The solution to this problem: a curry rice battle.
6	"A Great Terror! Pucchan's Curse"; Transliteration: "Dai-kyōfu! Putchan no Noroi" (Japanese: 大恐怖!プッチャンの呪い)	May 11, 2005
Pucchan is taken away from Rino by Vice President Nanaho, but escapes, and takes revenge on the entire Assault Squad.
7	"We Love to Help Out"; Transliteration: "Osekkai ga Suki" (Japanese: おせっかいが好き)	May 18, 2005
Mayura has been going out with a guy. The Best Student Council later learns why.
8	"Farewell! Best Student Council"; Transliteration: "Saraba! Gokujō Seitokai" (Japanese: さらば!極上生徒会)	May 25, 2005
Summer is just around the corner, but Rino, Cyndy, and Rein have to pass their finals in order to continue to stay at the Best Student Council dorms.
9	"Love Never Ends"; Transliteration: "Suki wa Tomaranai" (Japanese: 好きはとまらない)	June 1, 2005
Sayuri's rival, Kimizuka, arrives at Miyagami Academy, challenging Sayuri to a fight. Sayuri's past is revealed.
10	"Don't Let Her Put On Her Swimsuit!"; Transliteration: "Kanojo ni Mizugi o Kisenaide" (Japanese: 彼女に水着を着せないで)	June 8, 2005
It's summer time and boys from neighboring schools are desperately trying to get a peek at the girls in their swimsuits at the Miyagami swimming pool. Can Nanaho and Kuon find a way to prevent this chaos from happening again?
11	"Winning Five"; Transliteration: "Uiningu Faibu" (Japanese: ウイニング·ファイブ)	June 15, 2005
The Entire Futsal club at Miyagami Academy have come down with a summer cold before their first match with their rival school, the Kenran Academy. Will the Best Student Council be able to win their match, thereby protecting their President's reputation?
12	"It Happened on a Rainy Day"; Transliteration: "Sore wa Ame no Hi ni" (Japanese: それは雨の日に)	June 22, 2005
The story of how Kanade & Nanaho first met.
13	"Is Minamo-chan an Enemy or an Ally?"; Transliteration: "Teki ka Mikata ka Minamo-chan" (Japanese: 敵か味方かみなもちゃん)	June 29, 2005
With Kanade & Nanaho returning to the Dorms, they find it destroyed. Rino explains the whole story. This episode is where Episode 12 left off.
14	"Destitution Student Council"; Transliteration: "Gokuhin Seitokai" (Japanese: 極貧生徒会)	July 6, 2005
Minamo joins the Best Student Council officially, under Kanade's approval, and has an idea to get the money for their budget, after their Dorm was demolished (Thanks to Rino from the last episode). The solution: A play written by Minamo.
15	"The Reason I'm Here"; Transliteration: "Watashi ga Koko ni Iru Riyū" (Japanese: 私が此処にいる理由)	July 13, 2005
Kuon is revealed as a spy, assigned to find the secrets behind the Jinguji Power. But what will Kanade do about it?
16	"I Want You to Come Here"; Transliteration: "Anata ni Koko ni Ite Hoshii" (Japanese: あなたに此処にいて欲しい)	July 20, 2005
Seina forces Kotoha to patrol with Rino and Minamo, and Kotoha starts to find answers, including the truth about Kuon. This is where Episode 15 left off.
17	"Don't Lie!"; Transliteration: "Uso o Tsuki-tōse" (Japanese: 嘘をつきとおせ!)	July 27, 2005
Cyndy's mother comes to visit, and Cyndy lets the Best Student Council make her President during her visit.
18	"Hitoshi Satou, 28 years old, Occupation: Lawyer, Parents are Rich, and Even More Good Qualities to Make Him a Favorable Partner"; Transliteration: "Satō Hitoshi, Nijūhassai, Shokugyō Bengoshi, Ryōshin wa Shisanka, Kore Ijō ni nai Kō-jōken na O-aite" (Japanese: 佐藤仁史、28歳、職業弁護士、両親は資産家、これ以上にない好条件なお相手)	August 3, 2005
Itami gets into an arranged marriage, leaving Hirata jealous. Turns out that Hitoshi is Hirata's friend from high school. The title of the episode was used often as a running gag
19	"Farewell My Beloved Friends"; Transliteration: "Saraba Itoshiki Tomo yo" (Japanese: さらば愛しき友よ)	August 10, 2005
A puppet similar to Pucchan visits Miyagami Academy to see Pucchan.
20	"Ayu-chan Becomes an Idol"; Transliteration: "Ayu-chan Aidoru ni Naru" (Japanese: アユちゃん、アイドルになる)	August 17, 2005
Ayumu is scouted to become an idol, prompting her to leave Miyagami Academy. It ends in disaster.
21	"It Always 'Reins' On Fine Days"; Transliteration: "Hare no Hi wa Itsumo Rein" (Japanese: 晴れの日はいつもレイン)	August 24, 2005
The girls find a baby on their Dorm's doorstep. Rein agrees to care for the baby until they find the mother.
22	"Gokujou Card Battle"; Transliteration: "Gokujō Fuda Batoru" (Japanese: 極上札戦闘(バトル))	August 31, 2005
The new Best Student Council card game arrives, which many of the girls play. However, some of the Best Student Council members, including Rino, want to outlaw the game, as it reveals very disturbing traits of the members.
23	"Extraordinary Girl Detective Team"; Transliteration: "Kaiketsu Shōjo Tanteidan" (Japanese: 怪傑少女探偵団)	September 7, 2005
The girls form a Detective Team after hearing that Maachi has not been at the Dorms for days.
24	"Wanting to See You"; Transliteration: "Anata ni Aitakute" (Japanese: あなたに会いたくて)	September 14, 2005
Kanade is forced to leave Miyagami Academy after her grandfather, the leader of the Jinguji, dies. The entire Best Student Council, including Rino, is saddened. The council decides to go find the president.
25	"The Voice that Rode the Wind"; Transliteration: "Sono Koe wa Kaze ni Notte" (Japanese: その声は風にのって)	September 21, 2005
The Best Student Council plans to see Kanade again... by breaking into the Jinguji Family compound. Will they ever see Kanade again? This is where Episode 24 left off.
26	"A Gokujou Day, as Usual"; Transliteration: "Kyō mo Gokujō-biyori" (Japanese: 今日も極上日和)	September 28, 2005
Final Episode The future of Kanade Jinguji is determined, while Rino waits to see if she will return.
