= List of Strawberry 100% episodes =

List of Strawberry 100% episodes

This is a list of episodes from the anime series Strawberry 100% (いちご100%, Ichigo Hyaku Pāsento). Strawberry 100% TV series has 13 episodes. Each episode consisted of two short stories. The last pair of stories were not broadcast in the original run; lately this episode has become known as episode 10.5. The first OVA was released before the TV series aired, but chronologically the OVA story is direct continuation of the TV series. The second OVAs are not a continuation of the TV series, but are rather separate episodes based on certain chapters from the Strawberry 100% manga.

== TV series ==
The episode titles are given in story chronological order.

No.	Title	Original release date
1	"The Illusionary Strawberry Underwear / Misunderstanding or a Wrong Guess?"; Transliteration: "Maboroshi no ichigo pantsu / Gokai soretomo kanchigai?" (Japanese: 幻のいちごパンツ / 誤解それともカン違い?)	April 5, 2005
2	"Shaky Love in the Study Group / The Illusionary Beautiful Girl Again!"; Transliteration: "Yureru renai benkyō kai / Maboroshi no bishōjo futatabi!" (Japanese: 揺れる恋愛勉強会 / 幻の美少女ふたたび！)	April 12, 2005
3	"Second Button of Memories / Childhood Friend is a Spring Storm"; Transliteration: "Omoide no dai 2 botan / Haru no arashi wa osananajimi" (Japanese: 思い出の第2ボタン / 春の嵐は幼なじみ)	April 19, 2005
4	"Troublesome High School Life / The Wrong Heart and Mind"; Transliteration: "Haran no high school life / Sore chigau kokoro to omoi" (Japanese: 波乱のハイスクールライフ / すれ違うココロと想い)	April 26, 2005
5	"Panic IN MY ROOM / Raging Waves of the Summer Camp"; Transliteration: "Panic IN MY ROOM / Dotō no natsu gasshuku" (Japanese: パニック IN MY ROOM / 怒涛の夏合宿)	May 3, 2005
6	"Present of All One's Might / Unknown Destination of Feelings"; Transliteration: "Seiippai no present / Ikisaki fumei no kimochi" (Japanese: せいいっぱいのプレゼント / 行き先不明のキモチ)	May 10, 2005
7	"A Sudden Outburst! The Civil War / Christmas of Past Loneliness"; Transliteration: "Boppatsu! Nanbokusensō / Tatta hitori no Christmas" (Japanese: 勃発！ 南北戦争 / たったひとりのクリスマス)	May 17, 2005
8	"The Dream Continues Once More / A Hug in the Middle of the Snow!"; Transliteration: "Yume no tsuzuki wo mō ichido / Yuki no naka de dakishimete!" (Japanese: 夢の続きをもう一度 / 雪の中で抱きしめて！)	May 24, 2005
9	"Valentine's Chance Encounter / Sweet Bitter Chocolate"; Transliteration: "Sure chigai no valentine / Amakute nigai chocolate" (Japanese: すれ違いのバレンタイン / 甘くて苦いチョコレート)	May 31, 2005
10	"The Gratitude of Levelling Up / Heart-pounding First Date!?"; Transliteration: "Level up no orei / Dokidoki・hatsu date!?" (Japanese: レベルアップのお礼 / ドキドキ・初デート！？)	June 7, 2005
10.5	"Come pick me up! / I'm always on your side" Transliteration: "Mukae ni Kite! / Itsudatte Mikata dakara" (Japanese: 迎えにきて! / いつだって味方だから)	Unaired
11	"The Dangerous New Member / Determination! Birthday"; Transliteration: "Abunai shinnyuu buin / Ketsudan! Birthday" (Japanese: アブナイ新入部員 / 決断！ バースデイ)	June 14, 2005
12	"Another meeting in the rain / A true heroine" Transliteration: "Ame no Saikai / Hontō no Heroine" (Japanese: 雨の再会 / 本当のヒロイン)	June 21, 2005

== OVAs ==
No.	Title	Original release date
0	"Strawberry 100% - Love starts!? Photography training camp / Shaking heart going to the East and West"; Transliteration: "Ichigo 100% - Koi ga Hajimaru!? Yureru kokoro ga Higashi e nishi e" (Japanese: いちご100% 恋が始まる！？撮影合宿 ～ゆれるココロが東へ西へ～)	October 2004
1	"A Foggy Night's Ransen Festival"; Transliteration: "Yogiri no ransensai-hen" (Japanese: 夜霧の嵐泉祭)	June 20, 2005
2	"Ōmi School Exodus"; Transliteration: "Ōmi gakuen EXODUS" (Japanese: 桜海学園エクソダス)	August 29, 2005
3	"Fresh Pension Crisis~Beware of the Owner!~"; Transliteration: "Sawayaka PENSION CRISIS~OWNER ni ki o tsukero!~" (Japanese: さわやかペンションクライシス～オーナーに気をつけろ!)	September 26, 2005
4	"A Sudden Change of Heart!?"; Transliteration: "Kokorogawari wa totsuzen ni!?" (Japanese: こころ変わりは突然に!?)	October 31, 2005
