= List of Zoids: Genesis episodes =

The following is an episode list for the anime series Zoids: Genesis (ゾイドジェネシス, Zoido Jeneshisu), the fifth anime addition to the Zoids franchise. The show spanned 50 episodes and originally aired in Japan on TV Tokyo from April 2005 to March 2006. An English dub began airing on Cartoon Network in the Philippines on October 8, 2007.

== Theme songs ==
=== Opening themes ===
Title	Vocalist	Episode #
Nighthawk's Dream (夜鷹の夢, Yotaka no Yume)	Do As Infinity	1-50

Note: From episode 21 onwards, a slightly altered opening animation is used, but the song remains unchanged.

=== Ending themes ===
Title	Vocalist	Episode #
Real Love (REAL LOVE, Riaru Ravu)	PARADISE GO!!GO!!	1-28
Lovin'U The Way You Are (ありのままでLovin'U, Arino Mamade Lovin'U)	Shizuka Ito and Kimiko Koyama	29–43
I Held Your Hand Tightly (握りしめたその手に, Nigirishimeta sono Te ni)	Shizuka Ito and Kimiko Koyama	44–49

Note: The final episode does not have an ending theme. Instead, the credits are rolled over the end of the final scene, followed by shots of Murasame Liger running to Mirodo village taken from the first ending.

== Episode list ==
No.	Title	Original air date	English air date
1	"Raid"; Transliteration: "Shūgeki" (Japanese: 襲撃)	April 10, 2005	TBA
A young boy, Ruuji Familon, is assisting his father in recovering a Zoid from the bottom of a lake when his village is attacked by silver-plated "Bio-Zoids". None of the villagers are able to pilot the excavated Zoid, until Ruuji accidentally falls into the cockpit and activates it. He names the Zoid "Murasame Liger", and, with it, is able to fight off the invaders.
2	"Bio Zoid"; Transliteration: "Baio Zoido" (Japanese: バイオゾイド)	April 17, 2005	TBA
A Lance Stag and Sword Wolf appear and assist Ruuji in defeating the invading Bio-Zoids and dousing the fires in the village. The Zoids' pilots introduce themselves as Re Mii and Ra Kan, and explain that the Bio-Zoids' target was the village's Generator. When the Bio-Zoids attack again, Mii and Ra Kan are incapacitated, leaving Ruuji to fight on his own.
3	"Setitng Off"; Transliteration: "Tabidachi" (Japanese: 旅立ち)	April 24, 2005	TBA
Ruuji is about to be crushed, but Murasame Liger defends itself of its own accord. Heartened, Ruuji fights back and drives away the Bio-Zoids for good, but, during the battle, the village's Generator is damaged and shuts down. Ruuji, Mii, and Ra Kan leave the village in search of a mechanic who can repair the Generator.
4	"City of Beginnings"; Transliteration: "Hajimete no Machi" (Japanese: はじめての街)	May 1, 2005	TBA
The group arrives at a trade city. While Mii and Ra Kan go to scout out the area, Ruuji takes Murasame Liger into the city by himself, hoping to find a Generator mechanic. He is treated to lunch by a girl named Kotona, and while he is away from his Zoid it is stolen by a gang of thieves. Kotona reveals that she had planned all along to use the Liger as bait so she could catch the thieves. They use Kotona's bird-type Zoid, Rainbow Jerk, to catch up with the gang and recover Murasame Liger.
5	"Duel"; Transliteration: "Kettō" (Japanese: 決闘)	May 8, 2005	TBA
While Ruuji continues his search for a Generator mechanic, he runs into Kotona again. Kotona's friend Garaga has been harassing her, so she asks Ruuji to pretend to be her fiance in order to discourage him. Garaga challenges Ruuji to a Zoid battle to win Kotona's love. Ruuji fights against Garaga's Deadly Kong, but Ra Kan interrupts the battle.
6	"Mountain Hideout"; Transliteration: "Yama no Ajito" (Japanese: 山のアジト)	May 15, 2005	TBA
Garaga is revealed to be the leader of an anti-Digald guerrilla force. When his friends come under attack by Digald Bio-Raptors, Garaga enlists the help of Ruuji and the others to defend them. The group drives off the attacking Bio-Zoids, but Mii predicts that this is only the beginning.
7	"Mountain of Grief"; Transliteration: "Nageki no Yama" (Japanese: 嘆きの山)	May 22, 2005	TBA
The Bio-Raptors mount another attack on Garaga's base. The rebels plan a trap to defeat the Digald forces, but their plan is turned against them. Kotona is able to evacuate the rebels, but Ruuji and the others are surrounded and trapped inside the hideout. Murasame Liger manages to break down the wall and the group escapes into the valley.
8	"Underground Water Passage"; Transliteration: "Chika Suiro" (Japanese: 地下水路)	May 29, 2005	TBA
The group leave for the village of Sakusa to find a Zoid mechanic, who is a friend of Ron's. However, they are forced to turn back after Rainbow Jerk runs out of Reggel. The city has been taken over by Digald forces, so Ruuji sneaks in and meets up with Haara. They form a plan to take Reggel from the Generator without Digald catching them. Garaga and Ra Kan distract the Bio-Raptor guards, and Ruuji retrieves the Reggel, but he is spotted by Zairin, and the Mega-Raptor leads a counter-attack against them.
9	"Hot Springs Village"; Transliteration: "Onsen no Mura" (Japanese: 温泉の村)	June 5, 2005	TBA
Having escaped from the Bio-Raptors, Ruuji and the others arrive at Sakusa village, and meet the mechanic who was repairing Ron's Zoid, Bamburian. Ron wants to test Bamburian in battle, and challenges Ruuji to a friendly match. Ruuji loses the battle, and becomes determined to prove himself. He fights against a wild Zoid by himself, but is overwhelmed when more wild Zoids show up and attack him. He is saved by an unknown Zaber Fang-type Zoid.
10	"Hesitation"; Transliteration: "Mayoi" (Japanese: 迷い)	June 12, 2005	TBA
The morning after Ruuji left, he still has not returned. Kotona goes out to search for him, and comes across him staying at the home of the man in the Zaber Fang-type who saved him from the wild Zoids. Kotona recognizes the Zaber Fang as Soul Tiger, and its pilot as Seijuurou, supposedly the greatest Zoid pilot ever. Ruuji begs Seijuurou to teach him to become stronger, and he agrees to travel together with them.
11	"Traveling Companions"; Transliteration: "Tabi no Nakama" (Japanese: 旅の仲間)	June 19, 2005	TBA
The group finally has a lead as to the location of a Generator mechanic, a man named Ferde. They head off into the mountains, but Mii gets sick on the way. Ron, who knows a lot about herbs, tells Ruuji that there is a plant that can cure her, and he goes out with Seijuurou to find it.
12	"Infiltration"; Transliteration: "Sennyū" (Japanese: 潜入)	June 26, 2005	TBA
Arriving at their destination, the group finds the city of Ze Ruft taken over by Digald soldiers. Ruuji, Kotona, and Seijuurou sneak into the city to find the Generator mechanic. Meanwhile, Ra Kan and the others are discovered and surrounded by Bio-Zoids.
13	"Control"; Transliteration: "Shihai" (Japanese: 支配)	July 3, 2005	TBA
The Digald soldiers in the city are taking the citizens with the ability to pilot Zoids and putting them through military training. Ruuji and the others are captured and forced to do Digald's dirty work. Outside the city, the rest of the group retreats from the attacking Bio-Zoids, and Ra Kan spots the Ze Ruft defense squad coming to take back their city.
14	"Escape"; Transliteration: "Dasshutsu" (Japanese: 脱出)	July 10, 2005	TBA
The Ze Ruft defenders are completely overwhelmed and destroyed by Digald. Ruuji finally learns where Ferde is, and as the Ze Ruft forces mount another attack, the group goes to find him, only to discover he has been killed by Digald. The group escapes from the city empty-handed.
15	"Dispersal"; Transliteration: "Risan" (Japanese: 離散)	July 17, 2005	TBA
Ruuji is desperate to go back and help the people of Ze Ruft, but Ron disagrees. Ruuji and Garaga head back to the city on their own, and while they are away the rest of the group comes under attack by a large force of Bio-Zoids. Ruuji and Garaga rush back to help them. Everyone escapes safely, but the group is separated.
16	"Encounter"; Transliteration: "Deai" (Japanese: 出会い)	July 24, 2005	TBA
Separated from his friends, Ruuji runs into an anti-Digald group calling themselves "Tenka Muteki no Muteki-dan", and meets their leader, a woman called A Kan. The group assists Ruuji in searching for his friends and he is soon reunited with Garaga. They set a trap and attacks a Digald supply train, but Bio-Raptors arrive and Ruuji and Garaga are forced to save the Muteki-dan.
17	"Anger"; Transliteration: "Ikari" (Japanese: 怒り)	July 31, 2005	TBA
Muteki-dan intercepts another Digald supply train, but this time Digald has brought a full force of Bio-Raptors, and the Muteki-dan are completely wiped out. Garaga, in his anger, unleashes Deadly Kong's ultimate weapon, sending it into a berserk rage. It attack everyone and everything, including Murasame Liger. Ruuji calls out to Deadly Kong and it finally calms down.
18	"Reunion"; Transliteration: "Gōryū" (Japanese: 合流)	August 7, 2005	TBA
Mii, Ra Kan, Seijuurou and Kotona have reunited safely at Pikuru village. The villagers discover that they are being hunted by Digald, and plan to hand them over to the Bio-Raptors to protect their village. Ruuji and Garaga return just in time to save their companions.
19	"Crimson"; Transliteration: "Guren" (Japanese: 紅蓮(ぐれん))	August 14, 2005	TBA
An army of Bio-Zoids arrive at Pikuru village, led by Georg, who is determined to defeat Ra Kan. When they discovers that the group has already left, the Bio-Zoids begin burning down the village. Ruuji spots the smoke and convinces the group to head back and help the villagers. Ra Kan faces off against Georg, but with his injured arm he is unable to pilot Sword Wolf properly and is about to be defeated. Enraged, Ruuji attacks Georg, and Murasame Liger transforms into a Hayate Liger for the first time.
20	"Determination"; Transliteration: "Ketsui" (Japanese: 決意)	August 21, 2005	TBA
Georg's Bio-Tricera is defeated and Murasame Liger reverts to its old form. Ruuji names the new form "Hayate Liger". The next day, while the group is helping to repair the village, Ruuji thinks about Digald's continued attacks, and wants the group to form an organized resistance against them, with Ra Kan as its leader. Ra Kan tells the story of the kingdom he once ruled and how it was taken over by Digald. To test Ruuji's determination, Ra Kan challenges him to a fight, and quickly overpowers him. Just as the battle ends, Ron finally catches up and is reunited with the group. Ra Kan makes the decision that the group will return to Mirodo village.
21	"Homecoming"; Transliteration: "Kikyō" (Japanese: 帰郷)	August 28, 2005	TBA
Ruuji, Kotona and Ra Kan head back to Mirodo village in Rainbow Jerk. They pass by a city under attack by Digald, and Rainbow Jerk is attacked by a Bio-Ptera, a flying Bio-Zoid. They manage to escape, but arrive at Mirodo to find the village slowly dying. Ra Kan and Ruuji explain the situation to the villagers and they agree that they should fight Digald. Ruuji and the others head back to rejoin the rest of the group.
22	"Vow"; Transliteration: "Chikai" (Japanese: 誓い)	September 4, 2005	TBA
The group arrives in Zuuri City, and learn about Mii's past and the death of her parents. Ra Kan is reinstated as ruler of the city, and promises to the citizens that he will defeat Digald and bring peace back to the world. Seijuurou gives Ruuji some new training to help him pilot Hayate Liger.
23	"Hayate"; Transliteration: "Hayate" (Japanese: ハヤテ)	September 11, 2005	TBA
The group splits up to send appeals from Ra Kan to several resistance groups, asking them to help in the coming battles against Digald. Ruuji is the last to leave, but not before getting some more training in with Seijuurou. On the way to his destination, he is attacked by Bio-Zoids, and Murasame Liger transforms into Hayate Liger to fight them off. The rebels agree to fight with Ra Kan, and they return to Zuuri City with Ruuji.
24	"Arrogance"; Transliteration: "Ogori" (Japanese: 驕り)	September 18, 2005	TBA
Zairin thinks back to the time his village was destroyed by Bio-Zoids, how he came to be a Digald Bio-Raptor pilot himself, and how General Jiin told him of his goals to become a god and control the entire Digald Empire. Jiin later promoted Zairin to the rank of Major and gave control of Mega-Raptor to him. Meanwhile, in Zuuri City, the rebel troops gather and prepare for battle. The first Bio-Zoids attack and are defeated with the help of Ruuji and Hayate Liger.
25	"Advance"; Transliteration: "Shingun" (Japanese: 進軍)	September 25, 2005	TBA
The war against Digald begins, with Ra Kan's rebel army heading to its first target, Torafu. However, Zairin is able to read the army's movements and anticipates the attack. Seijuurou heads to Atakka as a distraction, while the rest of the rebels head down the River of Fog to Torafu.
26	"River of Mist"; Transliteration: "Kiri no Kawa" (Japanese: 霧の河)	October 2, 2005	TBA
Torafu's defense force is sent to protect Atakka. Meanwhile, the rebels begin arguing amongst themselves. The Elephunder team heads out by themselves, and the other groups follow, each determined to be the first to reach Torafu. Split apart, the rebels make easy prey for Zairin's Bio-Zoids. When Zairin learns that Ruuji has arrived, he heads out with Mega-Raptor to fight him. Murasame Liger transforms into Hayate Liger and defeats Mega-Raptor, also breaking the dam that kept water out of the River of Fog. The water flows down the river and washes away the Bio-Zoids.
27	"Road to Recovery"; Transliteration: "Saiki e no Michi" (Japanese: 再起への道)	October 9, 2005	TBA
The rebels have sustained heavy losses and are slowly recovering after the battle. Ra Kan temporarily disbands the army to give everyone a chance to think about what must be done next. Ruuji and the others are sent out to protect some trader friends of Ron's who are under attack by Bio-Raptors. The traders bring several upgraded weapons for the group's Zoids. Meanwhile, Zairin, having barely survived Ruuji's attack in the last battle, is returned to Digu City and Jiin shows him shown a mass-produced army of Mega-Raptors. Zairin is given a new Bio-Zoid, "Volcano".
28	"Legend"; Transliteration: "Densetsu" (Japanese: 伝説)	October 16, 2005	TBA
Ruuji's group splits up and goes to find more rebels to help battle Digald. Ruuji, Mii, and Ron reach their first destination, and there they learn about the event called "God's Fury", which destroyed the previously advanced civilization of Planet Zi. Hearing an explosion outside the city, Ruuji goes to investigate, and is attacked by Zairin with his new Zoid, Volcano. Leeo weapons are unable to damage Volcano and Ruuji is forced to retreat.
29	"Secret"; Transliteration: "Himitsu" (Japanese: 秘密)	October 23, 2005	TBA
Ra Kan and Kotona near Kotona's home, Ironrock, a supposedly cursed city. They are captured by the Makiri, guardians of Ironrock, led by Kotona's sister, Rina. Kotona reminisces about her childhood and how she came to possess her Zoid, Rainbow Jerk. The Makiri turn their captives over to Digald, but they escape with Kurukku's help and discover Digald's Zoid factory. They are hunted down again by Digald, and Rina takes a bullet in order to save Kotona. Ra Kan and Kotona escape from Bio-Ptera using the new powered up abilities of their Zoids.
30	"Forest of the Evil Spirit"; Transliteration: "Mamono no Mori" (Japanese: 魔物の森)	October 30, 2005	TBA
Garaga and Seijuurou enter the "Demon's Forest", looking for a powerful Zoid pilot named Danbul. Their Zoids begin moving strangely and acting on their own while inside the forest. They run into an old woman who claims to know Danbul, and soon after, are attacked by Bio-Zoids, including two of Digald's new Mega-Raptors. Despite their Zoids being unable to move in the forest, Garaga and Seijuurou prevail using their new upgraded weapons, and a little help from a new arrival, the Kane Wolf, which turns out to be piloted by the old lady. She is revealed to be Danbul, the "man" they were searching for, and agrees to join Ra Kan's army.
31	"The One Left Behind"; Transliteration: "Nokosa Reta Mono" (Japanese: 残された者)	November 6, 2005	TBA
Ruuji is attacked by a woman called Gaball, seeking revenge for her dead lover Dinga, who was part of Ra Kan's resistance army. Ron convinces her to take out her anger in a Zoid battle - her Brastle Tiger vs Ruuji's Murasame Liger. During the battle, a group of Bio-Zoids show up and Ruuji and Gaball are pushed into a trap. Ron and Mii come to their rescue, and Murasame transforms into Hayate Liger to finish the job.
32	"People of the Sky"; Transliteration: "Sora no Hito" (Japanese: ソラノヒト)	November 13, 2005	TBA
Ruuji's group reaches Katou City, and learns more about the People of the Sky, and their giant Zoid that supposedly carried people to the heavens. Ruuji and the others go diving and find part of this Zoid, the Gildragon, but most of it is buried under rocks. After leaving the city, they are attacked by Zairin, and even Hayate Liger is unable to defeat him. Ron unleashes his ultimate attack, destroying both Zairin's Volcano and his own Bamburian. Ron survives by riding out of the explosion on Hayate Liger's back.
33	"Omen"; Transliteration: "Yochō" (Japanese: 予兆)	November 20, 2005	TBA
Kotona and Ra Kan stop to refuel their Zoids. Kotona defends a helpless citizen against Digald soldiers and soon finds herself attacked by Bio-Kentro. Ra Kan comes to her aid, but Sword Wolf is badly damaged. Kotona attempts to airlift it to safety, but Rainbow Jerk is hit and crashlands. Ruuji's group arrives to help out, just in time to save Ra Kan and Sword Wolf from Bio-Kentro. Hayate Liger enters the battle, but Ruuji is unable to overcome Bio-Kentro even with the help of Ron's new Bamburian and Mii's Lance Stag, until his Liger transforms back into Murasame Liger, making a large and deep cut over Bio-Kentro's left front leg. After the battle and hearing that Zairin is still alive, he understands that he needs to become stronger and an image of "Mugen Liger" comes forth.
34	"Assault"; Transliteration: "Kyōshū" (Japanese: 強襲)	November 27, 2005	TBA
Ruuji's group returns to Zuuri, and as they are passing through the secret entrance they are spotted by Digald soldiers. The troops mount a sneak attack on the city in the middle of the night, and Felme drops Souta and Bio-Kentro into the city to go after Murasame Liger. Ruuji joins the battle with Hayate Liger, but once again has problems fighting Bio-Kentro. Hayate finally transforms into Mugen Liger and destroys Bio-Kentro. With one of their leaders gone, the Digald forces retreat.
35	"Ambush"; Transliteration: "Kishū" (Japanese: 奇襲)	December 4, 2005	TBA
Ruuji and the others mount a surprise attack on Digu - a show of power in an attempt to create more supporters of their army. They are countered by Bio-Tyranno, a Zoid piloted by Jiin himself. Their plan completed, the group flees from the city and heads back to Zuuri.
36	"Fall Apart"; Transliteration: "Hokorobi" (Japanese: ほころび)	December 11, 2005	TBA
Da Jin is unhappy with the Suppression Army using his city and wants to put rebuilding his fiefdom before defeating Digald. He challenges Ruuji to a deathmatch to decide Zuuri's fate. Ruuji overpowers him with Mugen Liger, and Da Jin attempts to kill himself by impaling his Lance Stag onto Mugen's blades. Mii steps in at the last minute and stops him, and order is restored to the city. Just as everything is calming down, several mysterious flying Zoids appear in the sky, headed for Zuuri.
37	"Invasion"; Transliteration: "Shūrai" (Japanese: 襲来)	December 18, 2005	TBA
The flying Bio-Raptor Gui Zoids, led by Bio-Ptera, attack Zuuri City. They drop bombs and severely damage the buildings, then quickly retreat. Amongst the citizens, Mii discovers an injured boy who has lost hims memories. Kotona recognizes him as Souta, pilot of the recently destroyed Bio-Kentro. Part of Souta's memory is recovered after he sees Murasame Liger, and he activates Deadly Kong to battle Murasame, but Ruuji subdues him and knocks him out.
38	"Assault (originally named Charge)"; Transliteration: "Totsugeki" (Japanese: 突撃)	December 25, 2005	TBA
The citizens disguise Zuuri's ruined buildings to make it look undamaged, spurring the Bio-Raptor Gui forces to mount another attack. Ruuji and the rest of the group head to Torafu and lie in wait for the Bio-Raptors to return. When the flying Zoids are sighted, Ron fires volleys of missiles, destroying them. However, the group is discovered by Jiin, who sends Bio-Raptors after them.
39	"Enter the Fortress"; Transliteration: "Nyūjō" (Japanese: 入城)	January 8, 2006	TBA
The attackers break into the fortress and overpower Digald. Felme attacks Torafu's Generator, aggravating Ruuji into attacking her, but she manages to escape him. After the battle, Ruuji meets a friend of Ron's who comes from Sora City - the city in the sky where the People of the Sky live, and where Ron also comes from.
40	"Bio Particle Gun"; Transliteration: "Baio Ryūshi-Hō" (Japanese: バイオ粒子砲)	January 15, 2006	TBA
Zairin and an army of Bio-Zoids are dispatched to take back Torafu. They attack and successfully enter the city, and Volcano faces off against Mugen Liger. Zairin finds he cannot control his body and Volcano starts moving on its own. It activates its Bio-Particle Cannon to destroy Ruuji, but Seijuurou deflects the blast at the last moment. Zairin and the Bio-Zoids beat a hasty retreat.
41	"Coup"; Transliteration: "Seihen" (Japanese: 政変)	January 22, 2006	TBA
Jiin's father, the ruler of Digald, dies, and Jiin takes over as King. His plans to rule the entire world and the sky kingdom are set in motion. Ruuji and the Suppression Army continue working to free towns and villages from Digald. Ruuji overworks himself and loses concentration in the middle of a battle.
42	"Secret Meeting"; Transliteration: "Mikkai" (Japanese: 密会)	January 29, 2006	TBA
The Suppression Army has succeeded in rescuing several more villages from Digald, and move on to their next target, Ebiya City. Ruuji and Kotona are left behind to organize the defense forces while the rest of the group heads off to battle. Souta suddenly remembers Felme and rushes off to meet her, stealing Mii's Lance Stag. Mii and Ruuji chase after in Murasame Liger. Ron secretly meets up with Felme and asks her what her true intentions are. Souta runs in on their conversation just as Felme is calling him an easy toy to manipulate. She summons Bio-Raptors to attack Souta and Ron. Ruuji arrives and fights against them, but loses concentration and passes out during the battle again. The rest of the group arrives just in time to rescue him.
43	"Key"; Transliteration: "Kagi" (Japanese: 鍵)	February 5, 2006	TBA
Digald strikes back at the rebels and retakes several of the captured cities. Ron, Kotona, Ruuji and Ra Kan begin unraveling the mysteries of the People of the Sky and the Gildragon. They discover that a Gildragon is buried under Ironrock City, and the keyword for activating it is Kotona's true name. Reluctantly, Kotona agrees with the group's plans to revive the Gildragon, and together they head for Ironrock.
44	"Takeoff"; Transliteration: "Ririku" (Japanese: 離陸)	February 12, 2006	TBA
While the rest of the Suppression Army takes care of the Bio-Zoid guards, Ruuji, Kotona and Ra Kan make their way into Ironrock's forbidden valley. Kotona is reunited with Rina, who leads them to the Makiri's sacred grounds, where the Gildragon is buried. Rina and Kotona speak the keywords and the ground splits open, releasing the Zoid. However, Kotona is unable to pilot it. Sensing this, Souta rushes to her aid while the rest of the group battles Zairin. With Souta's help, Gildragon is activated, and the others jump on board as it takes off.
45	"Inheritance"; Transliteration: "Isan" (Japanese: 遺産)	February 19, 2006	TBA
Decalto Dragon appears to guide Gildragon to Sora City. When it arrives, Zairin and Seijuurou are taken to have their wounds treated, while the rest of the group are told that it will take three days to produce the requested Metal Zi bullets. On the third day, everyone is gathered, but security forces appear suddenly to arrest Ron. Meanwhile, Felme and the Bio-Raptor Gui armies launch and prepare to attack Sora City.
46	"Fatal Flaw"; Transliteration: "Gakai" (Japanese: 瓦解)	February 26, 2006	TBA
The Digald forces, led by Felme, mount their attack on Sora City. They break through the energy shields and engage in combat with Sora's automated defense Zoids and its two Decalto Dragons. The Digald army quickly penetrates the city, destroying its generators and causing it to collapse and fall to the ground. The people of the city board Gildragon and Kotona and Souta successfully land them safely.
47	"Farewell"; Transliteration: "Ketsubetsu" (Japanese: 決別)	March 5, 2006	TBA
Jiin declares himself god of Digald and the entire world. Zairin and his troops fond themselves under attack by Bio-Raptors, and Zairin returns to Digu to demand an explanation from Jiin. It is revealed that the Bio-Zoid pilots are actually human souls extracted and placed inside machine soldiers in order to be compatible with the Zoids. Zairin begins setting the souls free of the machine soldiers, but is interrupted by Jiin, and Volcano faces off against the completed Bio-Tyranno. Zairin is rescued by Felme and the two of them flee.
48	"Divine Thunder"; Transliteration: "Kami no Kaminari" (Japanese: 神の雷)	March 12, 2006	TBA
The Suppression Army plans to tell the Digald soldiers about the machine pilots in the hope they will turn against Jiin, however Georg returns and attacks them before their plans are completed. Zairin shares the ideals of the rebels, and they join together to get a message out to the Digald troops. Bio-Tyranno and Bio-Tricera attack, and Ra Kan sound the retreat, but stays behind to fight Georg. He intentionally allows himself to be wounded to get inside Bio-Tricera's defense shield, and destroys both himself and Georg in a kamikaze attack
49	"Decisive Battle"; Transliteration: "Kessen" (Japanese: 決戦)	February 19, 2006	TBA
Ruuji takes over as leader of the Suppression Army, while Jiin begins destroying cities on his way to Torafu. Ruuji rallies the rebels along with Digald soldiers and they march out together to wage the final battle against their greatest enemy. The two rival forces clash and the fight begins.
50	"Rebirth"; Transliteration: "Saisei" (Japanese: 再生)	March 26, 2006	TBA
Zairin arrives and damages Bio-Tyranno, rendering it unable to use its Divine Thunder attack. However, Murasame Liger's Zoid Core is pierced and it stops moving. The group mount their final attack on Jiin, including Ra Kan, who has returned alive. Through Ruuji's will, his Zoid's Core is regenerated, and Murasame transforms into Mugen Liger to deliver the final blow to Bio-Tyranno's Zoid core.

== See also ==
- List of Zoids Chaotic Century/Guardian Force episodes
