= List of Ginban Kaleidoscope episodes =

The following is a list of episodes for the Japanese novel, manga and anime series Ginban Kaleidoscope. It was produced by Aniplex. It was aired in Japan on October 8, 2005, and ended on December 24, 2005.

No.	Title	Directed by	Written by	Storyboarded by	Original release date
1	"The $10 Billion Beauty"; Transliteration: "100 Oku Doru no Onna" (Japanese: 100億ドルの女)	Naoki Hishikawa	Akatsuki Yamatoya	Shinji Takamatsu	October 8, 2005
It started out that Tazusa was doing a jump, but went too fast and fell on the ice, which causes her to lose consciousness. It later turns out that when Tazusa was doing her jump, Pete was crashing on his plane because of mechanical defaults. Then it was revealed that the voice was Pete Pumps, a 16-year-old Canadian ghost. When she realizes that he possessed her, she tries to get him out in many ways. She even took a very hot bath to try to get him out. Pete can see what she sees and he saw her naked.
2	"Keyword is Tomato"; Transliteration: "Kīwādo wa Tomato" (Japanese: キーワードはトマト)	Hiro Kaburagi	Akatsuki Yamatoya	Keiichiro Kawaguchi	October 15, 2005
Pete wakes Tazusa which causes her to get annoyed and hit herself with a pillow. She stops going to the toilet because she feels embarrassed. Yōko, her younger sister, then comes in and says breakfast is ready. When she chews on a tomato, Pete suddenly groans. Later on, Pete asks her why the media hate her. Tazusa explains that last year at an important competition, Kyōko Shidō injured her leg and couldn't compete. The country was expecting Tazusa to be in first place, but she took a nose drop to 17th. In the end she couldn't take it anymore and goes to the bathroom.
3	"Triple Trouble"; Transliteration: "Toripuru Toraburu" (Japanese: トリプル·トラブル)	Hazuki Mizumoto	Natsuko Takahashi	Yoshitaka Fujimoto	October 22, 2005
Tazusa has to worry about school finals, Pete and the upcoming skating competition.
4	"Shocking Free Program"; Transliteration: "Kyōgaku no Furī Puroguramu" (Japanese: 驚愕のフリープログラム)	Shigeo Koshi	Michiko Yokote	Noriyuki Nakamura	October 29, 2005
Pete helps Tazusa skate as she fights for the lone spot on the Olympic team.
5	"On a Date Alone"; Transliteration: "Hitori de Dēto" (Japanese: 一人でデート)	Kunitoshi Okajima	Akatsuki Yamatoya	Yoshitaka Fujimoto	November 5, 2005
Tazusa got a day off from practice, due to putting much stress on her knees. She spends time doing some of Pete's favorite activities like watching a movie on planes and eating Canadian food.
6	"Change"; Transliteration: "Chenji" (Japanese: チェンジ)	Hiro Kaburagi	Rika Nakase	Keiichiro Kawaguchi	November 12, 2005
Tazusa learns the Queen of Ice skating is going to use the same song that she does.
7	"Hikami's Waitress"; Transliteration: "Hyōjō no Ueitoresu" (Japanese: 氷上のウエイトレス)	Hazuki Mizumoto	Natsuko Takahashi	Hiroyuki Yamada	November 19, 2005
Tazusa tries out the new routine and costume that Pete helped her with, it is a huge hit and she ranks much higher than usual.
8	"Break Out, Final Battle With the Press!"; Transliteration: "Masukomi Saishū Sensō, Boppatsu!" (Japanese: マスコミ最終戦争、勃発!)	Shigeo Koshi; Yasushi Kushibiki	Michiko Yokote	Yoshitaka Fujimoto	November 26, 2005
Tazusa battles with the media about her selection as the Olympic representative.
9	"Love Triangle"; Transliteration: "Toraianguru Rabu" (Japanese: トライアングル·ラブ)	Kunitoshi Okajima	Rika Nakase	Hiroyuki Yamada	December 3, 2005
Tazusa is under rumours that she is in love with Nitta the reporter, and this frustrates her. Pete also strongly suggests this could be true, until a surprise twist comes up and it is revealed he has a crush on Kyōko. Here we also find out that Pete and Tazusa start falling in love with each other.
10	"Time Limit"; Transliteration: "Taimu Rimitto" (Japanese: タイムリミット)	Shigeo Koshi	Akatsuki Yamatoya	Yoshitaka Fujimoto	December 10, 2005
Tazusa has to contend with the fact that the 100 days that Pete has with her will soon be ending. They decide together then they will stay with each other, and no more talk about how much time left.
11	"Kiss and Cry"; Transliteration: "Kisu Ando Kurai" (Japanese: キス·アンド·クライ)	Ryo Miyata	Natsuko Takahashi	Hiroyuki Yamada	December 17, 2005
Tazusa travels to Torino and performs her short program. The waitress act earns her second place, and Pete gives her a congratulations kiss.
12	"Cinderella"; Transliteration: "Shinderera" (Japanese: シンデレラ)	Alan Smithee	Akatsuki Yamatoya	Alan Smithee	December 24, 2005
Pete and Tazusa perform their last dance together for the free program portion of the contest. As they were skating together, they gave each other a passionate kiss. Tazusa ended up with 4th place. During the awards ceremony, Tazusa and Pete share their last dance together. Just after Pete went up to heaven, Tazusa stands alone and says, "I love you". During the end credits, it shows how the life of the people around Tazusa changes (For example, her coach got married). At the very end, Tazusa hears and sees a plane in the sky.
