= List of Loveless episodes =

The episodes of Loveless are based on the manga of the same name by Yun Kōga. The twelve episodes anime adaptation was made by J.C. STAFF, and first aired in Japan from April 2005 to June 2005. The opening theme music is "Tsuki no Curse" by Okina Reika and the ending is "Michiyuki" by Kaori Hikida; both were composed by Yuki Kajiura and arranged by Masayuki Sakamoto. Media Blasters licensed and released an English subtitled version in early 2006.

== Episode list ==
No.	Title	Animation Director	Screenwriter	Original release date
1	"Breathless"	Yumi Nakayama	Yuji Kawahara	April 6, 2005
Aoyagi Ritsuka is twelve years old when his older brother Seimei is killed. Some time later, Soubi, a self-proclaimed friend of the late Seimei, comes and introduces himself and tells Ritsuka that he loves him. Before Ritsuka has time to react, two children at Ritsuka's age, the Breathless pair, attack Soubi and Ritsuka, but Soubi easily fends them off. Soubi then tells Ritsuka his true name is Loveless, which causes Ritsuka to remember Seimei's true name, Beloved, which Seimei told Ritsuka just before he died.
2	"Memoryless"	Yumi Nakayama	Yuji Kawahara	April 13, 2005
Ritsuka uses his true name, Loveless, as a password to open a file in Seimei's computer that was never accessible before. There he finds pictures of himself and Seimei and a letter telling him that he has left Ritsuka the Fighter, Soubi. Seimei and Soubi were a fighting duo like Breathless, Seimei being the Sacrifice and Soubi being the Fighter. Now that Seimei is dead, it has fallen upon Ritsuka to take his brother's place in the fighting duo and become the new sacrifice.
3	"Bondless"	Yumi Nakayama	Yuji Kawahara	April 20, 2005
Soubi asks Ritsuka to pierce his ears, and after much hesitation, he complies. Ritsuka then asks Soubi to tell him all he knows about The Seven Moons, the organization that killed Seimei, but Soubi refuses and won't say why. Soubi then leaves and thinks to himself that Seimei ordered him to be Ritsuka's Fighter, but that he didn't think he would fall in love. Ritsuka admits to himself that all he is thinking about is Soubi, and wonders what the true meaning of love is.
4	"Friendless"	Yumi Nakayama	Yuji Kawahara	April 27, 2005
Yuiko makes strawberry jam for Ritsuka, but her classmates bully her and the jar drops out the window. Ritsuka enters and stands up for Yuiko, frustrating Yayoi because he was trying to help Yuiko but got no recognition. Angry that Soubi refuses to tell him anything, Ritsuka orders him to take a picture of a nearly extinct mountain cat. Yuiko tells the teacher that she loves Ritsuka, and the Breathless duo meet Ritsuka again and advise him to part with Soubi, but also don't give him any information regarding his brother. Ritsuka goes back home to find Soubi waiting with several pictures of the mountain cat, and it is hinted that Ritsuka's mother is beating him.
5	"Sleepless"	Yumi Nakayama	Yuji Kawahara	May 4, 2005
Ritsuka and Soubi are attacked by another duo sent by Septimal Moon, Sleepless, who carry a letter from the teacher of the Fighter school that has information about Seimei's death. Ritsuka and Soubi fight and defeat Sleepless, and Soubi takes the letter and gives it to Ritsuka. Ritsuka finds out from Sleepless that not only did Seimei attend Septimal Moon's Fighter school, he was the top student. Later, Ritsuka opens the letter only to find a string of letters and numbers, and he has trouble sleeping because he can't stop thinking about Soubi.
6	"Painless"	Yumi Nakayama	Yuji Kawahara	May 11, 2005
Ritsuka's teacher once again tries to go to Ritsuka's house to have a parent-teacher conference, but she runs into the next fighting pair from Septimal Moon: Natsuo (the Fighter) and Youji (the Sacrifice), who call themselves "Zero." She tells them her full name and the boys use it to take control of her. Soubi walks by and saves her, but gets in a fight with Natsuo and Youjo even though his power is at a quarter of what it usually is because Ritsuka is not with him. Soubi is having a hard time in the fight, and has one arm shackled, and thinks back to a lesson at the Fighter school when he learns that Zero is an artificial pair that can't feel pain.
7	"Tearless"	Yumi Nakayama	Yuji Kawahara	May 18, 2005
Soubi beats Zero by creating a snowstorm, taking advantage of their one weakness: their blood congeals much faster than a human's. Ritsuka hears Soubi when he cries out in pain from his wounds, and goes out to find Soubi. When Ritsuka finds Soubi, Soubi lies and says he's fine and runs away, but Ritsuka sees drops of blood on the ground and knows Soubi is hurt. Later, Soubi is taking care of the Zero pair because Seimei told him 'to do things right to the end', and Soubi receives a text from Ritsuka never to lie to him again.
8	"Trustless"	Yumi Nakayama	Yuji Kawahara	May 25, 2005
Septimal Moon send another Zero pair - Kouya, the Fighter, and Yamato, the Sacrifice - to punish Soubi for not calling his Sacrifice to the battle, and because Ritsuka ordered Soubi not to fight without him, Soubi is defeated as he refuses to fight back. Ritsuka tries calling Soubi, and when Soubi doesn't pick up he knows something is wrong and goes to find him. Ritsuka finds Soubi by the river, covered in wounds, and Soubi loses consciousness.
9	"Skinless"	Yumi Nakayama	Yuji Kawahara	June 1, 2005
Natsuo and Youji arrive and together with Ritsuka and take Soubi home in a taxi. From talking to Zero, Ritsuka learns that Seimei and Soubi's strength together was legendary, and that Soubi is not Ritsuka's true Fighter. There is another Fighter out there that Ritsuka hasn't discovered yet that shares the name Loveless who is his real partner. Kouya and Yamto show up with orders to defeat Soubi again but this time Ritsuka must be with him too. Natsuo and Youji go to fight instead, and both Zero pairs are surprised that another Zero pair exists. Kouya and Yamato, being the original pair, are furious at being replaced and cast a total restriction spell on Youji.
10	"Nameless"	Yumi Nakayama	Yuji Kawahara	June 8, 2005
Yamato takes Ritsuka out to lunch and Ritsuka finds out that Zeroes are not artificially made people; they're actually human beings whose ability to feel pain has been blocked from the receptors in their brains. That evening, Kouya, Yamato, Soubi, and Ritsuka fight, and Soubi easily defeats the Zero girls. Ritsuka stops Soubi from delivering the final blow, and Kouya and Yamato decide to forfeit the battle. They then choose to stop being Fighter and Sacrifice, and after they reaffirm their love for one another, they feel as if they have been reborn.
11	"Warless"	Yumi Nakayama	Yuji Kawahara	June 22, 2005
A comic relief episode in which Ritsuka, Yayoi, Yuiko, and their teacher decide to go together to a seaside fair. Ritsuka forbids Soubi from coming, so Soubi along with Kio secretly follow them and while spying, Soubi sees what looks like Ritsuka and Yuiko kissing, but in reality was nothing. Kio talks to Ritsuka and says that Soubi was always getting hurt because of Seimei, but had been happy and became a zombie when Seimei died. Kio is glad that Ritsuka is normal unlike Seimei, and that Soubi has become human again after meeting him.
12	"Endless"	Yumi Nakayama	Yuji Kawahara	June 29, 2005
Ritsuka is invited, along with Yuiko, to go over to Yayoi's house to play video games. There he sees a code similar to the one he was given by The Seven Moons and finds out that it refers to a specific world and location inside an online video game. After hours of playing, Ritsuka reaches the correct place and, unbeknowest to him, is drugged and put to sleep. In his sleep, the drugs cause him to have horrible dreams in which Yayoi, Yuiko, and Ritsuka's mom and teacher are brutally murdered. Then Soubi appears and says that he was the one who killed everyone because he was ordered to, and tries to kill Ritsuka. Ritsuka's will to live breaks the spell and he wakes up, and he immediately goes to find Soubi. Once together, Ritsuka asks Soubi if he would kill him if Seimei were alive and ordered it, and Soubi says that he would die first before that happened. In the trees nearby, the man who caused Ritsuka to have the horrible nightmares, who is hinted to be Seimei, wonders which will win: Ritsuka's strong will to live or the fate that goes with the name Loveless.

== DVD releases ==
Bandai Entertainment released six Region 2 DVD compilations, each containing two episodes, from July 22, 2005, to December 23, 2005. A limited edition six-disc boxed set was released on June 25, 2008; it included an unreleased drama CD and a booklet.

Bandai Entertainment DVD releases
Volume	Released	Discs	Episodes
1	July 22, 2005	1	2
2	August 26, 2005	1	2
3	September 23, 2005	1	2
4	October 28, 2005	1	2
5	November 25, 2005	1	2
6	December 23, 2005	1	2
Box	June 25, 2008	6	12

Region 1 DVD releases
Volume	Released	Discs	Episodes
1	February 14, 2006		4
2	March 28, 2006		4
3	April 25, 2006		4
