= List of Elemental Gelade episodes =

This is a list of episodes for the anime adaptation of Elemental Gelade. The action adventure series is directed by Shigeru Ueda and produced by the Japanese animation studio Xebec. Twenty-six episodes were produced and originally broadcast on TV Tokyo between 5 April 2005 to 27 September 2005 at 6 pm. The episodes are based on the Elemental Gelade manga series created by Mayumi Azuma. It revolves around the adventures of a young sky pirate named Coud Van Giruet, an Edel Raid named Reverie Metherlence, and three members of an Edel Raid Complete Protection Agency named Cisqua, Rowen, and Kuea as they journey to the land of gold, Edel Garden.

The series is licensed in North America by Geneon Entertainment. Six DVD volumes were released bi-monthly from June 2006 to April 2007 containing four to five episodes each. An English airing appeared on the American television network ImaginAsian TV as part of their animation block "Anime EnerG". It was first aired in Japanese with English subtitles beginning on 30 January 2007 and later aired with English dubs. The series also first aired on January 3, 2009, on the Jetix Family Channel.

== Episode list ==
No.	Title	Original release date	English release date
1	"The Songs of the Sky and Wind"; Transliteration: "Sora to Kaze no Uta" (Japanese: 空と風の謳)	5 April 2005	30 January 2007
After a raid by the Red Lynx sky pirates, young Coud rummages through the loot. He finds a dusty box with Ren sleeping in it. Cisqua, Rowen, and Kuea, three members of Arc Aile, board the ship offering money for Ren, but Coud refuses. The ship is attacked leaving only Coud to protect Ren. But while Coud is protecting her, Ren decides to react with Coud.
2	"The Fateful React"; Transliteration: "Unmei no Riakuto" (Japanese: 運命の同契)	12 April 2005	6 February 2007
The Red Lynx airship crashes after the attack forcing everyone to evacuate. On the ground, Ren explains she is on a journey to Edel Garden. Coud decides to accommodate her. With no money or food, the three Arc Aile members tag along because it's their job to protect Ren.
3	"Betrayal and Confusion"; Transliteration: "Uragiri no Shichikou-Hōju" (Japanese: 裏切りの七煌宝樹)	19 April 2005	13 February 2007
Ren is kidnapped in the middle of the night by Beazon, while the five stayed at an inn for the night. Coud, Cisqua, Rowen, and Kuea infiltrate his castle to save her. After they do, they make their escape only to be intercepted by Beazon and Parl.
4	"Elemental Gelade of Light and Darkness"; Transliteration: "Hikari to Yami no Erementaru Jereido" (Japanese: 光と闇の核石)	26 April 2005	20 February 2007
Escaping from Beazon and Parl, they are trapped by an army of giant beasts called Laguras. They find Parl being attacked by one of the beasts. Saving her, she explains she wishes to escape and she'll help them. She leads Coud and the others to the exit except she tricked them by leading them to Beazon.
5	"The Teardrop from that Day"; Transliteration: "Ano Hi no Tiadoroppu" (Japanese: あの日の落涙)	3 May 2005	27 February 2007
Coud meets an old friend named Rig. Saying their hellos and goodbyes, Rig is attacked by two Sting Raids. Coud asks Cisqua to help him train, but they are attacked by the Sting Raids who are using Rig's body as a shield.
6	"Eyeing the Pleasure"; Transliteration: "Purejaa o Mitsumete" (Japanese: 同契者を見つめて)	10 May 2005	6 March 2007
The group find shelter and Coud continues his harsh training and Rowen finds a part time job. Coud is unable to control his power when reacted with Ren so he asks Rowen for help. While Rowen is at his job, the remaining four are attacked by masked men.
7	"Determination"; Transliteration: "Oburigaazu e no Ketsui" (Japanese: 併唱謳への決意)	17 May 2005	13 March 2007
The group finds an empty crashed air ship. Coud and Rowen fix the ship, but as they start to journey to Edel Garden by air, Grayarts and Cocowet attack. The assassins attack Rowen and Kuea mistaking them as Coud and Ren. Rowen defeats the assassins but with the expense of damaging the air ship.
8	"The Edel Hunter"; Transliteration: "Senritsu no Edirureido Hantaa" (Japanese: 戦慄の煌珠狩者)	24 May 2005	20 March 2007
Ren and Coud find a frightened Edel Raid named Selena when they are filling their ship with fuel. Selena explains that she is going home after she escaped from Arc Aile. They are attacked by Wolx Hound and Tilel who destroys the air ship. While Cisqua holds off Wolx's attacks, Selena escapes and makes her way to her village only to discover that she's been away too long.
9	"The Secret of Razfe Ankle"; Transliteration: "Razufe-Ankuru no Himitsu" (Japanese: 港町の秘密)	31 May 2005	27 March 2007
Ren and Coud are ordered to find a job when they reach the town of Razfe Ankul. Coud saves Lillia who was being harassed, but he is mistaken as the culprit and attacked by Rasati. Rasati offers Ren and Coud shelter for the night as an apology. Meanwhile, Ciqua, Rowen, and Kuea discover an illegal fighting arena.
10	"Love and Greed"; Transliteration: "Ai to Yokubō no Miriarudo-Torei" (Japanese: 愛と欲望の賭闘場)	6 June 2005	3 April 2007
Coud and Ren react to defeat a gang of thugs who attempt to kidnap Lillia. As Coud searches for a job, one of the thugs who attacked them tips Coud about the fighting arena. Coud and Ren enter to make money while Cisqua enjoys the money she wins by betting.
11	"Revenge of the Krasfighter"; Transliteration: "Fukushyū no Kurasufaitaa" (Japanese: 復讐の賭闘士)	13 June 2005	10 April 2007
Coud's next opponent is Rasati. After an even match, Rasati manages to win. With the win, Rasati finally has enough money to win Lillia's freedom except Marl forces Rasati to fight in a two-on-one battle. Rasati and Lillia react to defeat the two fighters.
12	"Sprint to Freedom"; Transliteration: "Jiyū e no Shissō" (Japanese: 自由への疾走)	21 June 2005	17 April 2007
Marl orders his men to attack them. Coud and the others manage to fight off the attackers while Rasati chases after the fleeing Marl. Arc Aile shows up securing the arena and saves the group just as they are overwhelmed. Ren is taken into custody by Arc Aile officers and separated from Coud.
13	"Arc Aile"; Transliteration: "Aaku Eiru" (Japanese: 守護翼)	28 June 2005	24 April 2007
Ren awakens and is told that she is in Edel Garden and has been asleep for seven years. Coud is told that Ren was sent to Edel Garden. He attempts to make his way to Edel Garden, but he is shot by a sniper. Ren awakens to find her dreams was manipulated by a machine and Coud badly injured. She blames herself for Coud's hardships and journeys to Edel Garden by herself.
14	"The Return of the Hunter"; Transliteration: "Edirureido Hantaa, Sairin" (Japanese: 煌珠狩者、再臨)	5 July 2005	1 May 2007
Coud awakens and chases after Ren who is far ahead. He is attacked by Wolx Hound who is on a mission to capture Ren and ignores the fact that Ren is nowhere to be seen. Coud successfully escapes Tilel's attacks until she doesn't have enough energy to fight. Cisqua finally catches up to Coud, as Rowen and Kuea are searching elsewhere nearby. As the fight continues, Tilel becomes too weak to continue fighting, but Wolx orders her to keep fighting. When Tilel says that she will protect Wolx, Coud and Cisqua leave, allowing Tilel to win the fight.
15	"The Village with the Large Windmill"; Transliteration: "Ere-Buranka" (Japanese: 大風車の村)	12 July 2005	8 May 2007
Ren finds her way to the windmill city, El Blanca, but the village windmill doesn't turn because a large wall is blocking the path of the wind. The large wall was built by a small gang of thugs. Ren is almost hit by an airplane piloted by Eugene, a boy who wishes to break the wall down. He apologizes and offers Ren a place to rest. Eugene succeeds in breaking the wall the next day. Coud catches up to Ren, and defeats the thugs as they are about to attack. Three Sting raid appear and take control of the thugs' bodies; Ren reacts with Coud, and together, they defeat them.
16	"Memory of a Wildbird"; Transliteration: "Tsuioku no Wairudoburiddo" (Japanese: 追憶の銃弾)	19 July 2005	15 May 2007
The group takes a cruise boat to the continent where Edel Garden lies. Coud collapses after he is poisoned by a dart. During the night, Coud suddenly awakes and tries to kill Ren. Meanwhile, a Sting Raid poses people on board and drains their energy. Cisqua discovers her friend Myna, also a member Arc Aile, is the one who poisoned Coud and the Sting Raid. Myna is able to control their actions through a song that she and Cisqua both know. To save Ren from Myna, Cisqua is forced to shoot her. At the end of the episode, Cisqua begins to sing the song.
17	"The Rocky Fateful Encounter"; Transliteration: "Haran no Kaikō" (Japanese: 波瀾の邂逅)	26 July 2005	22 May 2007
After landing on the new continent, Viro introduces herself to the group. Coud takes Viro along with them to where she wants to go after she is attacked by sailors. Ren becomes jealous of Coud and Viro's relationship and runs away while the group rests at an inn for the night, but she is attacked by Marl who is possessed by a Sting Raid.
18	"Fictitious React"; Transliteration: "Itsuwari no Riakuto" (Japanese: 偽りの同契)	2 August 2005	29 May 2007
Viro reacts with Coud and defeats Marl. She leaves the group because Cisqua suspects her of being a spy and devises a plan to group with them again by leading the group to a dangerous part of the desert. She falls victim to her own plan, but she is saved by Coud. She regains Cisqua's trust with her attempt to save them and the group takes her as a guide to Edel Garden.
19	"Unspoken Thoughts"; Transliteration: "Ishikoro no Omoi" (Japanese: 石ころの想い)	9 August 2005	5 June 2007
While the men, mostly Coud, are fixing the van, the girls take a swim in a close river. Viro asks Ren if she could be Coud's girlfriend and Ren allows her to if Coud accepts. Viro, Coud, and Ren are attacked by a Sting Raid and Coud and Ren react to defeat it. Coud and Ren talk with one another at a lake and say they both want to be with each other. Then, the two blush and kiss. Viro watches and places her hand tightly next to her chest, where her Sting Raid gem is. Then, she begins to cry.Thinking that no matter what she may be, she can never be what she wants.
20	"Viro"; Transliteration: "Viro" (Japanese: 擬煌珠)	16 August 2005	12 June 2007
Viro is ordered to assassinate Coud, but she is tormented on what to do by her conscience. She manages to get Coud alone and attacks him. The others are unable to rescue him because Viro poisoned the food with a poison to numb the body not to kill them which she made for dinner. Viro gives up after she is saved by Coud from a falling tree and she returns the favour by saving Coud from an attack from Gladius by sacrificing herself. Before dying, her wish is granted and she becomes an Edel Raid.
21	"The Truth Unfolds"; Transliteration: "Akasareta Shinjitsu" (Japanese: 明かされた真実)	23 August 2005	19 June 2007
Ren becomes ill and the group decides to find a place to rest. They find shelter in an abandoned village. In the middle of the night, they are attacked by Orfus, Jilltail, and Aljeena from Chaos Choir. Coud and the others manage to overpower them. Ren unreacts after she is suddenly contacted by Eve and with Coud defensiveless, he becomes badly hurt.
22	"The Buried Legend"; Transliteration: "Houmurareshi densetsu" (Japanese: 葬られし伝説)	30 August 2005	26 June 2007
The fight with Chaos Choir is interrupted by an attack from an Arc Aile airship. The three leaders of Chaos Choir escape but not before they damage the airship. The group makes their way to the crashed ship so they can treat Coud's injuries only to be surprised to meet Sunweld. Sunweld tells Cisqua of an ancient legend from Edel Garden.
23	"The Promise"; Transliteration: "Yakusoku" (Japanese: 約束)	6 September 2005	3 July 2007
Coud and the others arrive at foot of Edel Garden to find a war between Chaos Choir and Arc Aile. At night, Ren is approached by the three leaders of Chaos Choir who proposes they will end the war if she will become their new queen, which she accepts. Coud decides to go to Edel Garden to rescue Ren. In order to get through Chaos Choir's defenses, Wolx, Tilel, Rasati, and Lillia aid in clearing a path.
24	"Edel Garden"; Transliteration: "Ediru Gaaden" (Japanese: 煌珠楽園)	13 September 2005	10 July 2007
Ren is brought to Edel Garden's palace and accepts the position as queen. Coud, Cisqua, Rowen, and Kuea find the palace and are forced to fight the three leaders of Chaos Choir. Rowen and Kuea get injured and Coud is killed.
25	"Chaos Choir"; Transliteration: "Kaosu Kuia" (Japanese: 煌珠楽園)	20 September 2005	17 July 2007
With Coud out of the way, the leaders of Chaos Choir carry out the ceremony to make Ren queen. Eve revives Coud, just before she dies and tells him to save Ren. Cisqua orders Coud to seal Ren with a sealing charm but he refuses. By hearing Coud's voice, Ren breaks the ceremony, but Orfus, Jilltail, and Aljeena takes over her body by reacting with her.
26	"The Song For The Sky And Tomorrow"; Transliteration: "Sora to Ashita no Uta" (Japanese: 天空と未来の謳)	27 September 2005	24 July 2007
Coud and the others are no match against Ren reacted with the three Chaos Choir leaders, but they continue to fight to save Ren. During the battle, Eve contacts Coud telepathically to sing a song within him. Chanting the song, Ren regains control of her body and sings the lost song with Coud. Contracts between Edel Raids and pleasures are broken and the Chaos Choir leaders are shocked because they did not believe the prophecy will come true. They declare their defeat and the war is over. Coud goes back to his life as a Red Lynx sky pirate and Ren stays with him in the end.

== See also ==
- List of Elemental Gelade characters
