= List of Starship Operators episodes =

This is a complete episode listing of the anime television series Starship Operators, created by J.C.Staff. The series premiered January 5, 2005, on TV Tokyo in Japan.

== Episode list ==
No.	Title	Original release date
1	"Count Down"; Transliteration: "Kaunto Daun" (Japanese: カウント·ダウン)	January 5, 2005
The 73rd graduating class of the Defense University is returning to planet Kibi in the combat spaceship Amaterasu, only to find that their home planet has been subdued. Left behind on the ship, the cadets make a deal with the Galaxy Network in order to fight the oppressor.
2	"Trafalgar Crisis"; Transliteration: "Torafarugā Kuraishisu" (Japanese: トラファルガー·クライシス)	January 12, 2005
Former Kibi Prime Minister Tatsuma Mamiya boards the Amaterasu to establish the ship as a government-in-exile. However, the Amaterasu is forced to warp to neutral planet Phoenicia by enemy ships and Kibi fighters. Not long after they flee, the Kingdom warship Trafalgar challenges them to a fight.
3	"Call From Home"; Transliteration: "Kōru Furomu Hōmu" (Japanese: コール·フロム·ホーム)	January 19, 2005
The Kingdom leadership decides to change tactics in dealing with the Amaterasu, which they deem a renegade and pirate vessel. Amid discontent and disunity in the ship's crew, Sanri's wealthy father makes an appeal for them to turn themselves in.
4	"Final Answer"; Transliteration: "Fainaru Ansā" (Japanese: ファイナル·アンサー)	January 26, 2005
The Kingdom sends the stealth vessel Aboukir to the Amaterasu with a simple message, saying to "surrender or die." The Operators find themselves frantically searching the stars for the elusive vessel.
5	"Great Escape - Part 1"; Transliteration: "Gurēto Esukēpu Zenpen" (Japanese: グレート·エスケープ 前編)	February 2, 2005
Short on supplies, the Amaterasu manages to make a deal with the Planetary Nation of Shu for replenishment. The government invites the main bridge crew to a welcome ceremony, but they are stranded when the Kingdom declares war on Shu.
6	"Great Escape - Part 2"; Transliteration: "Gurēto Esukēpu Kōhen" (Japanese: グレート·エスケープ 後編)	February 9, 2005
As battles rage between factions on planet Shu, the stranded bridge crew must risk a dangerous retrieval mission. Shu Defense Minister Wong offers to fight the incoming Kingdom blockade with the Shenlong and to provide an escape route for the Amaterasu if the Shenlong should fall. Another Amaterasu crew member dies in the line of duty.
7	"Stardust Memory - Part 1"; Transliteration: "Sutādasuto Memorī Zenpen" (Japanese: スターダスト·メモリー前編)	February 16, 2005
After careful analysis and repeated combat trials with Cisca, Sinon formulates a strategy for the upcoming battle with four Kingdom warships. The catch, however, is that timing is critical in the strategy.
8	"Stardust Memory - Part 2"; Transliteration: "Sutādasuto Memorī Kōhen" (Japanese: スターダスト·メモリー後編)	February 23, 2005
The Shenlong sacrifices herself to allow the Amaterasu to escape. Although the Amaterasu is able to sink one ship, the trapped vessel warps away, taking a drone laser ship with it.
9	"Turning Point"; Transliteration: "Tāningu Pointo" (Japanese: ターニング·ポイント)	March 2, 2005
The Supreme Chairman of the Kingdom dies and Isabelle, his right hand, is the likely candidate to succeed him. The Amaterasu has warped into neutral space so they go to the spaceport of Parnia for resupply. Kouki takes his chances and asks Sinon out, catching her off guard. Mamiya Tatsuma travels to Earth to speak at an U.N. conference and to request the Earth Federation's assistance.
10	"Sudden Death"; Transliteration: "Sadon Desu" (Japanese: サドン·デス)	March 9, 2005
After the ressuply, AGI invites the crew of the Amaterasu to a party. The non-bridge staff elect to remain on board. Isabelle eliminates her political rivals during the Supreme Chairman's funeral. During the party, Kingdom commandos invade the docking bay of the Amaterasu, and Kouki is killed in the firefight. Its safety threatened, AGI cancels the support contract out of fear.
11	"Return Match"; Transliteration: "Ritān Matchi" (Japanese: リターン·マッチ)	March 16, 2005
Cisca informs the crew that they are free to resign, but only supply officer Sei does so. With five battleships approaching, Sinon comes up with an idea that will improve the turning speed of the Amaterasu, in order to target hostiles faster. Dita persuades Peter to broadcast the battle live, but with censored ship displays. The main systems of the Amaterasu are exhausted, but all enemy ships are destroyed with the exception of the Conquistador.
12	"War Cry"; Transliteration: "Uō Kurai" (Japanese: ウオー·クライ)	March 23, 2005
Blind and crippled, the Amaterasu struggle to regain their footing. The Conquistador is likewise blind from the last shot from the Amaterasu's plasma cannon. The Amaterasu decides to rush the Conquistador while she is still shooting blindly. Before the Conquistador can fire the finishing blow, she is ordered to hand the Amaterasu to the Earth Federation.
13	"Moment of Truth"; Transliteration: "Mōmento obu Turūsu" (Japanese: モーメント·オブ·トゥルース)	March 30, 2005
Using the Amaterasu incident as a rationale, the Earth Federation stages a massive coup d'état within the Kingdom, and demands the surrender of the Amaterasu. In the face of inevitable defeat, Sinon formulates a political strategy of her own. The Amaterasu's crew escaped via shuttle while Dita broadcasts the Earth Alliance's attack on the guard ship. Shimei Yuuki, the only Kibi commissioned officer still on board, stays behind to ensure the success of Sinon's final plan.
