= List of Guyver episodes =

This is an episode listing of Guyver: The Bioboosted Armor (Japanese: 強殖装甲ガイバー, Hepburn: Kyōshoku Sōkō Gaibā), which aired in Japan on Wowow from August 6, 2005, to February 18, 2006.

== Episode list ==
No.	Title	Original release date
1	"The Amazing Bioboosted Armor"; Transliteration: "Kyōi no Kyōshoku Sōkō" (Japanese: 驚異の強殖装甲)	August 6, 2005
Two police officers encounter and are killed by a strange man who is actually a Zoanoid created by the Cronos organization. The Zoanoid stole three Guyver units from the organization and is now being pursued by them. During a confrontation between Chronos troops and the Zoanoid named Malmot, the units are scattered through the area, where Sho and Tetsuro are. The two find the unit and Sho activates it, becoming Guyver I.
2	"Secret Organization Cronos"; Transliteration: "Himitsu Kessha Kuronosu" (Japanese: 秘密結社クロノス)	August 13, 2005
Cronos finds out that Tetsuro may know where the Guyver is, so they send two of their Zoanoids in disguise as police detectives and question Tetsuro. Sho follows them but is caught. Sho activates the Guyver unit and faces the two Zoanoids. Another Zoanoid named Vamore appears and faces Sho with two large lasers mounted on his shoulders, but is thwarted by the Guyver's own mega-smasher. Meanwhile, Cronos Inspector Lisker obtains the final Guyver unit and merges with it.
3	"Inspector Lisker"; Transliteration: "Kansatsukan Risukā" (Japanese: 監察官リスカー)	August 20, 2005
Cronos, now knowing that Sho has the Guyver unit they are looking for, sends a troop of Zoanoids to intercept Sho. Sho becomes the Guyver and takes care of the Zoanoids but a new Zoanoid, Synevite, gives Sho a difficult time. Sho gains access to a new weapon, the Guyver's high-frequency blades. With this, he defeats Synevite. After the battle, Lisker, as Guyver II, faces Sho to take back the Guyver unit.
4	"Visitor of the Dusk"; Transliteration: "Tasogare no Raihōsha" (Japanese: 黄昏の来訪者)	August 27, 2005
Lisker and Sho face off. Lisker has the upper hand and states that because he is the better fighter, Sho has no chance. However, the damaged control metal on the Guyver II unit malfunctions from damage, allowing Sho and Tetsuro to escape. Commander Richard Guyot shows up and assumes the position of the Head of Cronos Japan. He introduces Hyper-Zoanoid Zerbubuth, While at school, Sho and Tetsuro encounter Zoanoids and Zerbubuth, forcing Sho to face the threat, but with much difficulty.
5	"The Third Shadow"; Transliteration: "Dai San no Kage" (Japanese: 第三の影)	September 3, 2005
Genzo Makashima, ex-head of Cronos Japan and Agito Makashima's foster father, is punished by being processed as a Zoanoid. Sho and Tetsuro find out that the incident at their school was treated as a terrorist attack, a cover-up by Chronos. While at a cafe during after-school hours, the two are faced by a Zoanoid in disguised named Noskov. Sho leaves the cafe and faces Noskov, who is accompanied by another Zoanoid, Myumelzee. After a failed attempt, Noskov retreats but is faced by Guyver III.
6	"The End of a Deadly Battle..."; Transliteration: "Shitō no Hate ni..." (Japanese: 死闘の果てに...)	September 10, 2005
Guyot introduces the Hyper-Zoanoid called ENZYME, his key to retrieving the Guyver unit. He then reveals his plan to capture Guyver I to Agito. Meanwhile, Sho and Tetsuro are talking about how the monster kidnapped Mizuki and how they made up some stories so she wouldn't become involved. They return to Mt. Narasawa to see if they can learn anything about the Guyver, but are faced by Genzo Makashima. Makashima then transforms into ENZYME and attacks Sho.
7	"Miracle of Supreme Cell"; Transliteration: "Kiseki no Chōsaibō" (Japanese: 奇跡の超細胞)	September 17, 2005
Guyver I is killed by Enzyme and Tetsuro is taken captive by Cronos. Guyot explains to Tetsuro in detail about Cronos' plan to dominate the world through the events of X-Day. Meanwhile, as scientists study the Guyver I Control Medal, Guyver III appears and deals with the scientists and watches Guyver I "regenerate." A regenerated Guyver I causes chaos in the Cronos building, killing everyone and everything in its path, defeating a powered-up Zerbubuth, who is finished off by Lisker.
8	"The Shaking Skyscraper"; Transliteration: "Gekishin no Matenrō" (Japanese: 激震の摩天楼)	October 1, 2005
Guyver I, while in Self-Defense Mode, continues to cause chaos in Cronos. Tetsuro encounters Guyver I and awakens Sho, disabling the "SDM" of Guyver I. Meanwhile, Guyver III, being close to achieving his goal in destroying Cronos Japan, encounters Guyver II and the two battle. Meanwhile, Sho and Tetsuro encounter Guyot, who explains to them about the creators of mankind. Guyver II intervenes and faces Sho one last time.
9	"Ashes and Chasing Memories"; Transliteration: "Hai to Tsuioku" (Japanese: 灰と追憶)	October 8, 2005
After the fall of Cronos Japan, Sho has doubts about being himself, as he thinks that he may be a clone made by Guyver I. Agito, while at home, encounters Guyot, who was thought to be dead. The next day, Tetsuro and Sho encounter a new Hyper-Zoanoid, Panadyne. Sho fights with Panadyne at the cost of his home. Sho is overwhelmed by the new Zoanoid but is aided by a man named Masaki Murakami. After the battle, Mizuki finds out Sho's secret.
10	"Prelude of the Chase"; Transliteration: "Tsuigeki e no Jokyoku" (Japanese: 追撃への序曲)	October 15, 2005
At Agito's home, Guyot reveals new plans to capture Guyver I. Agito then excuses himself and leaves, but comes back as Guyver III and faces Guyot. Meanwhile, Sho and Tetsuro find Mizuki and realize that Sho's secret is exposed. Then, his father is kidnapped by Cronos, forcing Sho to find him. Cronos then abducts Mizuki and Tetsuro as well. While on the chase, Sho encounters the Lost Numbers unit. Sho has a difficult time defeating them but is aided by Masaki Murakami.
11	"Relic's Point"; Transliteration: "Iseki Kichi" (Japanese: 遺跡基地)	October 22, 2005
After being helped by Murakami from the fight against the Lost Numbers unit, Sho goes to Mt. Minakami, another Cronos base, with Murakami to rescue his father and the Segawa siblings. Meanwhile, the hostages are taken to Mt. Minakami and are imprisoned until Agito, who reveals himself as Guyver III, frees them. However as they make their escape they encounter the Hyper-Zoanoid Team 5, along with Dr. Balcus and Guyot, who now know Agito's true identity.
12	"Respective Decisions"; Transliteration: "Sorezore no Ketsui" (Japanese: それぞれの決意)	October 29, 2005
As the Elite Hyper-Zoanoid Five interfere with Guyver III and company's escape, Guyver I comes in to aid them. They are able to escape but one of the Hyper-Zoanoid team members, ZX-Tole, manages to abduct Sho's father. Another Hyper-Zoanoid team member, Elegen, deactivates Sho's armor. The group is forced to retreat to Agito's hideout. There, they meet Agito's childhood friend, Shizu. Later, Guyver I sneaks out to save his father but encounters Guyver III. Together, they embark to Mt. Minakami.
13	"The Tragic Enzyme II"; Transliteration: "Higeki no Enzaimu II" (Japanese: 悲劇のエンザイムII)	November 5, 2005
Sho and Agito make their way to Mt. Minakami with little interference. They are able to save Sho's father and escape. The Hyper-Zoanoid members ZX-Tole, Elegen, and Thancrus stop Guyver III from meeting up with Sho and his father. Meanwhile, Dr. Balcus gives a command, transforming Sho's father into a new Hyper-Zoanoid, ENZYME II. Enzyme II catches Sho (as Guyver I) off-guard and kills Sho. However, Guyver I reactivates itself in Self-Defense Mode.
14	"Escape in the Rain"; Transliteration: "Ame no Tōhikō" (Japanese: 雨の逃避行)	November 12, 2005
Sho is found unconscious and his group must leave the hideout because it has been discovered by Cronos. Tetsuro explains the events that happened from when the Guyver allowed Sho's brain to regenerate to the present situation the group is in now. As the group make an escape, three ENZYME II Zoanoids get in their way. Guyver III attempts to fight against them but is overpowered. Guyver I also attempts to fight but his armor deactivates. Murakami is the only one left to fight. Murakami then reveals his past.
15	"Guyot Strikes"; Transliteration: "Gyuō Shutsujin" (Japanese: ギュオー出陣)	November 19, 2005
Murakami continues to explain to the rest of the group about mankind's past. The Creators, or "Advents", created and experimented with new life, especially man, to make bio-weapons. Murakami then explains about the Zoalords and the Guyver's origin and purpose. A shocked Mizuki runs away and Sho chases after her. Sho catches up to Mizuki and comforts her. Meanwhile, Guyot manages to find the rest of the group and attacks them.
16	"The Awakened Guyver I"; Transliteration: "Yomigaere Gaibā I" (Japanese: 甦れガイバーI)	November 26, 2005
After hearing an explosion from where their friends are, Sho and Mizuki run back to find a large hole that looked like it was from a blast. Among the rubble was Guyot himself. Zoanoids are now sent out to find any remaining survivors. Mizuki and Sho go into hiding in a cave, where Sho questions why he cannot turn into the Guyver. Aptom, disguised as Guyver III, explains to Sho why he is in that condition and what happened in the past Enzyme II incident with his father. A traumatized Sho must gather the courage to protect Mizuki and himself.
17	"The Nightmare Encircling Net"; Transliteration: "Akuma no Hōimō" (Japanese: 悪魔の包囲網)	December 3, 2005
After a harsh battle against Aptom, Sho returns to a worried Mizuki, who happens to lecture him about her worrying about him, but is happy that he returned to her. Aptom, trying to recover from the past battle, encounters the Elite Hyper-Zoanoid 5 and absorbs Elegan. Sho and Mizuki run off to a town which houses a horde of Zoanoids. Sho tries not to kill any of them because they were all innocent people. They then encounter Guyver III, who wipes the Zoanoids out.
18	"Vibration"; Transliteration: "Iseki Meidō" (Japanese: 遺跡鳴動)	December 10, 2005
Sho, Mizuki, and Agito make their way back to Mt. Minakami where their friends are. They head towards the underground lab of a group of ex-Cronos scientists who are planning a mutiny. As the company rejoices in their reunion, Tetsuro explains how they escaped from Guyot's attack. Murakami is healing himself through an Advent ship named the "Relic" and an unknowing Guyot. The relic begins to vibrate as Murakami heals himself.
19	"The Night Before the Strike"; Transliteration: "Totsunyū Zen'ya" (Japanese: 突入前夜)	December 17, 2005
After their reunion, Mizuki starts to think that she may be a burden to the group. The twelve Zoaloards meet and talk about Richard Guyot. Archanfel goes to deal with the problem. Murakami then is fully recovered, but explains that he only has one transformation left before he meets his fate. Mizuki starts to worry about Sho's fate. The group discuss plans on reviving the "Relic". Archanfel faces Guyot about the "Remover". Sho and Agito prepare to enter the "relic".
20	"The Advents' Ship"; Transliteration: "Kōrinsha no Fune" (Japanese: 降臨者の船)	January 7, 2006
Chief Odagiri, one of the ex-Cronos scientists, explains how Cronos obtained the Guyver units. Sho and Agito make their way into the Relic and find where the units were stored. Sho connects to the Relic, where he learns more about the Advents and the very first Guyver (Guyver 0). He also learns that he can control the Relic through his own will. Archanfel still questions Guyot about the "Remover" but Guyot denies him and runs away.
21	"Chaos at Relics Point"; Transliteration: "Konran no Iseki Kichi" (Japanese: 混乱の遺跡基地)	January 14, 2006
Guyot is still on the run, with Archanfel following closely. While this is happening, Aptom is able to absorb Gaster and Darzerb, having the power of three Hyper-Zoanoids. ZX-Tole faces Aptom and is able to absorb part of ZX-Tole's body as he was escaping, completing his absorption of the Hyper-Zoanoid Team 5. Guyot is now facing off against Archanfel, using what powers he has. Archanfel is able to deflect his attacks but Guyot has one last trick up his sleeve.
22	"Countdown of Destruction"; Transliteration: "Hōkai no Kaunto Daun" (Japanese: 崩壊のカウント·ダウン)	January 21, 2006
The rest of the twelve Zoalords appear on top of Mt. Minakami. Guyot is using his Black Hole attack against Archanfel and is able to get him sucked in. Balcus helps Guyot seal the rift so Archanfel can't escape. With no one to stop him, Guyot obtains the Remover and uses it on Agito, almost removing the Guyver unit from him. Murakami then faces Guyot, but Chief Odagiri attempts to save Murakami which gets him killed, enraging Murakami. Guyot and Murakami begin to clash with one another and begin their battle.
23	"Beam of Annihilation"; Transliteration: "Senmetsu no Kōbō" (Japanese: 殲滅の光芒)	January 28, 2006
Murakami and Zoalord Guyot go at it. It seems that Murakami was able to inflict a deal of damage on Guyot, but wasn't enough to finish him. Guyot grabs a now powerless Murakami, beating him and then tearing his arm out, killing him. Sho leaves the Relic to face Guyot, but is interrupted by the Zoalord council. Archanfel returns and deals with Guyot personally. Both Guyver I and Guyver III attempt to fight against Archanfel with their mega-smashers, but proves no match against Archanfel's power.
24	"At the Town Under Oppression"; Transliteration: "Seiatsuka no Machi de" (Japanese: 制圧下の街で)	February 4, 2006
Some time has passed since the Mt. Minakami incident. X-Day has already taken place, leaving Cronos the rulers of the world. A year after the events of X-Day, life seems normal other than the fact that Zoanoids are among the population. Tetsuro, Mizuki, Yohei Onuma, and Shizu Onuma are in hiding in an apartment, unknowing that Aptom is watching over them. They begin to doubt Sho is still alive. Balcus is working on a particular Zoanoid to defeat Aptom.
25	"The Quickening Chrysalis"; Transliteration: "Taidō no Sanagi" (Japanese: 胎動の蛹)	February 11, 2006
Cronos scientists are seen with a large cocoon-shaped object in their lab but are soon interrupted by Guyver III. He is leading a group called the Zeus Thunderbolt against the Cronos corporation. Guyver III recollects his memories of the aftermath of the battle against Archanfel, which led to their apparent deaths. Sho sacrificed himself and manages to save everyone. In the present, a recovered and renewed ZX-Tole attacks Aptom and the two face off. Aptom's attack are useless against Neo ZX-Tole.
26	"Advent!! Gigantic Bio-Boost"; Transliteration: "Kōrin!! Kyojin Shokusō" (Japanese: 降臨!!巨人殖装)	February 18, 2006
Tetsuro and company notice Aptom's fight with Neo ZX-Tole and that Aptom is defending them. Guyver III arrives along with a large cocoon. He explains that Sho is inside the cocoon. Guyver III then faces Neo ZX-Tole, but is powerless against him. The fight goes badly until the cocoon opens up. A gigantic figure emerges from inside. The figure faces and annihilates Neo ZX-Tole with ease. After the battle, the figure splits open to reveal Guyver I (Sho), whom deactivates his armor and collapses into Mizuki's arms, welcoming Sho back home.
