= List of Suzuka episodes =

This is a list of episodes of the anime series Suzuka. It follows the manga up to volume 9 chapter 72.

== Episode list ==
No.	Title	Directed by	Written by	Original release date
1	"Anticipation"; Transliteration: "Kitai" (Japanese: 期待)	Hiroshi Fukutomi	Hiroko Tokita	July 7, 2005
When Yamato meets Suzuka for the first time, he believes that it is "love at first sight." In this episode, Yamato moves to the Girl's Dormitory that his aunt runs, and meets both his aunt, as well as his cousin Miho. Just as he thinks that life in a spa would be wonderful, he meets two very strange college girls. One of the girls, Yuuka, immediately starts harassing him, and in an embarrassing situation, he realizes that Suzuka also lives in the dormitory.
2	"Smile"; Transliteration: "Egao" (Japanese: 笑顔)	Shigeru Kimiya	Hiroko Tokita	July 14, 2005
Yashunobu, Yamato's "friend" from childhood suddenly shows up one day in Yamato's room. His past is revealed to be a perverted child. He never shows this trait in front of adults, so he is thought to be more mature than Yamato. In addition, it is revealed that he is also very mischievous, playing tricks all the time. To prevent Yasunobu from hitting on Suzuka, Yamato tells Yasunobu that Suzuka is an ugly 50-year-old woman, getting himself in trouble with Suzuka.
3	"Sick Day"; Transliteration: "Mimai" (Japanese: 見舞)	Ayumi Ishihara	Yuka Yamada	July 21, 2005
At last, Yamato starts attending the local school. During breaks, he realizes that he is pretty much alone, since Suzuka has track friends, and Yasunobu has his local friends. When least expecting it, he is approached by Honoka, who is revealed to be part of Yamato's past. He later accompanies Suzuka shopping, resulting in him getting sick. When he hears a knock on the door, with anticipation he expects Suzuka, only to find Yasunobu accompanied by, surprisingly, Honoka.
4	"Field Day"; Transliteration: "Shunran" (Japanese: 春嵐)	Hiroshi Ishiodori	Michiko Itō	July 28, 2005
It is the day of the fitness tests, and while Yamato was a legend in his hometown schools, he is failing miserably in his new school. Later, he realizes that this school specializes in sports. Initially, Yamato was unwilling to run the track test, due to his "abysmal" running in middle school. Eventually, he is persuaded to run, and reveals himself to be faster than the boy who got into the school through sprinting scholarship. According to Yasunobu, this supposedly earned him "points" with Suzuka.
5	"Eye of the Storm"; Transliteration: "Koiwazura" (Japanese: 恋患)	Akira Katō	Hiroko Tokita	August 4, 2005
When Yamato finds Suzuka talking to Miyamoto, a person on the track team, he gets curious, but when he hears them talking about doing something together, he gets jealous. Eventually, when Yamato is caught listening in on their conversation, he realizes that Miyamoto was only asking Suzuka for help in asking Yamato onto the track team, due to his spectacular performance the day before. In addition to this good surprise, Yamato also discovers Suzuka's feminine side during a lightning storm.
6	"A Day at the Park"; Transliteration: "Kokuhaku" (Japanese: 告白)	Hiromichi Matano	Yuka Yamada	August 11, 2005
When a weird newspaper girl appears in front of Yamato's room, offering two tickets to the amusement park with a subscription to the newspaper, Yamato thinks that the free day they have coming up is the best time to ask Suzuka out. Unfortunately, Megumi and Yuuka go into his room to goof off, and his tickets end up getting shredded by his cat. When all hope is lost, Suzuka "humbly" asks him out, using tickets that she got from the same newspaper girl. Using such a perfect chance, will Yamato confess his feelings?
7	"Decision"; Transliteration: "Ketsui" (Japanese: 決意)	Yūichirō Miyake	Michiko Itō	August 18, 2005
After getting completely rejected, Yamato ends up going through depression, and is cured by the unlikely Yuuka, after revealing her past and her former "normal" self. Yamato decides that he definitely likes Suzuka, and will not give up after being rejected once. He decides to join the track team, and seeks Yasunobu's advice. Unfortunately, Suzuka overhears their conversation, and does not think that Yamato will try hard in track, and will slow them down instead. After she leaves, Yasunobu suggests that he apologize, and that Yamato was a slacker his whole life, so being in the track team was not plausible. When Yamato goes into the track office to apologize, he ends up signing up for the track team.
8	"Distance"; Transliteration: "Kyori" (Japanese: 距離)	Minoru Yamaoka	Hiroko Tokita	August 25, 2005
At Yamato's first track practice, he is completely overwhelmed by the immense workout, and gets completely worn out. Miki, a sprinter on track, introduces herself to Yamato, and reveals that she is Suzuka's friend. When Yamato wears out completely, Miki encourages him, and explains to him why Suzuka was so angry about him joining track, and shows him Suzuka's personal training program. This encourages him to work harder, and to lessen the distance between Suzuka and himself.
9	"A Frame in Time"; Transliteration: "Shashin" (Japanese: 写真)	Shigeru Kimiya	Yuka Yamada	September 1, 2005
After two weeks of training, Yamato becomes accustomed to the practices, and officially beats Kenji, the scholarship student, in a time trial, running 100 meters in 10.98 seconds. Instead of being congratulated by Suzuka, she tells him that she despises him. In addition, he now has to carry on Miyamoto and Kinugasu (the track team captain)'s expectations. Later on, he finds out that Suzuka is going home to visit a Kazuki Tsuda, which troubles him for a while. When he finds a photo of Suzuka and another guy in Suzuka's room, he runs after her without second thought.
10	"An Old Flame"; Transliteration: "Koigataki" (Japanese: 恋敵)	Ayumi Ishihara	Michiko Itō	September 8, 2005
When Suzuka goes home to visit a certain Kazuki, Yamato chases after her, and eventually finds her house, which turns out to be very big. At the doorstep, he meets Suzuka's sister, who takes him to see Suzuka and Kazuki. When he realizes Kazuki is dead and Suzuka was visiting his grave, he goes home without even letting Suzuka know he was there. In addition, he learns that Kazuki was also a rocket starter, and that he greatly resembles him.
11	"Showdown"; Transliteration: "Shōbu" (Japanese: 勝負)	Hiroshi Ishiodori	Yuka Yamada	September 15, 2005
The day of the tournament has arrived, and Yamato decides to skip it. Instead, he tries to get Yasunobu to go to a karaoke with him, but ends up getting lured to the site of the meet. There, he finds Suzuka getting picked on by a person from another school. He ends up revealing himself from his hiding place, and making himself enemies with Arima Emerson, the current fastest runner in the 100 meter. Will he be able to beat Emerson, even though he has missed practice for three consecutive days?
12	"Misunderstandings"; Transliteration: "Gokai" (Japanese: 誤解)	Akira Katō	Hiroko Tokita	September 22, 2005
When Yamato hears a knock on his door, he opens it to find the newspaper girl again, only this time, she's working for a TV company and offers him her "last" two tickets to the pool. Yamato, realizing she's using the same trick as last time, tells her that she most likely has more. She ends up giving him the two tickets for free, and tells him to ask out his girl. The next day at school, Honoka asks Yamato to the pool; evidently, she also got tickets from the TV girl. However, she fails horribly at asking in secret, and Miki hears and asks almost everyone else, including Suzuka, to the pool. Yamato, excited, believes this is a chance to get close to her. Meanwhile, Honoka is trying to get closer to Yamato using the same method.
13	"Lips"; Transliteration: "Kuchibiru" (Japanese: 口唇)	Hiromichi Matano	Yuka Yamada	September 29, 2005
The Inter High competition arrives, and is being hosted at Hiroshima, Yamato's hometown. Suzuka is there to compete, while Yamato is only a cheerleader. Yamato is depressed by his failures with Suzuka and the track team. Yasunobu encourages Honoka to confess to Yamato, or else Suzuka will steal Yamato. Honoka comforts Yamato after practice. However, Miki has told Suzuka to do the same thing, so while Honoka is with Yamato, Suzuka shows up. Honoka panics and kisses Yamato, then walks away embarrassed. The next day, Suzuka wins third place in the tournament and gets much attention, which depresses Yamato even more. Honoka finds Yamato sulking alone and tries to kiss him again. He stops her, but when she starts crying about not being a couple, Yamato kisses her. Miki sees them.
14	"Blessing"; Transliteration: "Shukufuku" (Japanese: 祝福)	Kahoru Igusa	Michiko Itō	October 6, 2005
Yamato asks Honoka to become a couple. The next day, Suzuka asks Yamato to go shopping, but he declines. When Suzuka tries to pick a t-shirt for Yamato, Miki tells her he is dating Honoka. Suzuka is visibly disturbed by this, but says nothing. After dinner, Honoka and Yamato sit together. Honoka confesses her longtime love for him. Miki talks to Yasunobu about Yamato. She thinks his behavior is irresponsible towards Suzuka, but Yasunobu thinks it is good for Honoka. Suzuka talks to Yamato after practice. He confirms that he is dating Honoka. She congratulates him and acts normal, but stays up late thinking about it. The next day, she avoids Yamato, while he has dinner with Honoka and friends from the team. On the train back from Hiroshima, Yamato steps out to buy drinks, but trips right before making back to the train. Suzuka goes to help him, but they both get abandoned by the train.
15	"Bellflower"; Transliteration: "Hotarubukuro" (Japanese: 蛍袋)	Minoru Yamaoka	Hiroko Tokita	October 13, 2005
While they sit stranded in Hiroshima, Suzuka asks Yamato about his relationship with Honoka. Yamato responds happily until Suzuka gets angry and stops him. When Yamato's father comes to pick them up, he refuses to let Suzuka stay by herself at a hotel, bringing her home with them. Suzuka meets Yamato's family. Wanting to impress Suzuka, Yamato asks her to stay another night and see the fireflies. She declines, and when Yamato gets upset at her coldness, she says he is incomprehensible, and being nice to the wrong person. After hearing Yamato on the phone with Honoka, Suzuka changes her mind, and decides to see the fireflies. When they arrive at the bridge, there are no fireflies in sight. Yamato reveals he went there to confess to someone before, with the same result. After being laughed at by Suzuka, he says he is prouder of the confession he made to her. She urges him to show his planned confession. He finds a firefly and puts it into a bellflower, causing the bellflower to glow. Suzuka is touched and accepts his confession. When he reacts seriously to this, she says she was only joking.
16	"Impulse"; Transliteration: "Shōdō" (Japanese: 衝動)	Shigeru Kimiya	Yuka Yamada	October 20, 2005
When they get back, Suzuka takes her leave after Honoka approaches them. Honoka, apparently, was very "worried" about Yamato, but when he tells her he likes her for the first time, she is completely confident. Later on, Yasunobu reveals that he knows about Yamato and Honoka, and states that he should bring the relationship to the next level, causing Yamato to stutter and decline. When Honoka goes over to Yamato's home to cook for him, he suddenly starts thinking about Suzuka. To convince himself that he likes Honoka, he lets his impulse drive him, causing Honoka to run away scared.
17	"Boyfriend"; Transliteration: "Kareshi" (Japanese: 彼氏)	Ayumi Ishihara	Hiroko Tokita	October 27, 2005
After practice, Suzuka wants to share an umbrella with Yamato, but since Miki is there, she ends up lending one to him instead. The next day, Honoka introduces him to Shirakawa Nana, a pop idol who was her mentor. At karaoke, when Honoka goes to the bathroom to hide her embarrassment, Suzuka finds Yamato singing with a blond woman, and accuses Yamato of two timing Honoka. This is later cleared when Honoka and Miki arrive. Yamato doesn't want to sing, until Suzuka challenges him. They start to sing a duet, but Honoka looks nervous so he stops, to show loyalty to Honoka. Nana probes him afterwards and realizes that Yamato is not really being himself around Honoka, that he is just acting like a good boyfriend without really getting close to her. Yamato vows to try harder to be a good boyfriend.
18	"Present"; Transliteration: "Okurimono" (Japanese: 贈物)	Hiroshi Ishiodori	Michiko Itō	November 3, 2005
For Honoka's birthday, Yamato wants to surprise her and buy a very meaningful gift. To achieve this, he asks the residents of the inn to help him choose, but they all give really bad advice, and he ends up resorting to a magazine. Eventually, he asks Suzuka to help him choose, and she agrees. After wandering for so long, Yamato buys a necklace from a street vendor, using Suzuka as a modeling dummy. On the way back, Honoka spots Yamato with Suzuka. When Yamato presents the gift to Honoka later on, Yamato tells her that he actually went with Suzuka, and not Yasunobu, only to find that Honoka already knew. Because of her calm attitude, he takes this as a good sign, and goes into detail about how he bought it with Suzuka, and ends up getting his gift given back to him.
19	"Breakup"; Transliteration: "Wakare" (Japanese: 別離)	Akira Katō	Hiroko Tokita	November 10, 2005
Yamato consults Yasunobu, blaming him for part of it. When he returns home, Suzuka apologizes, and blames herself for this. Yamato then sees that it really is his own fault, and goes to apologize to Honoka. At Honoka's house, Yamato attempts to give the present again, only to end up in an argument with Honoka about their relationship. Honoka suggests breaking up, and Yamato agrees. In the end, Honoka asks if she can still have the present, and gives him a goodbye kiss. Later on, his grieving-silently-in-own-room is interrupted in the forms of Yuuka and a drunk Megumi, who attempt to counsel him. When Suzuka approaches him later, he lies and tells her that he forcibly dumped Honoka (due to the fact that Honoka believed Yamato still liked Suzuka), causing Suzuka to hate him.
20	"Support"; Transliteration: "Ōen" (Japanese: 応援)	Hiromichi Matano	Hiroko Tokita	November 17, 2005
After the breakup, Miki and Yasunobu attempt to cheer up Yamato, while Nana cheers up Honoka. Honoka eventually comes back as manager, and reveals just how much the track needs her. Miki, however, hears Suzuka's version of the breakup, and confronts Yamato, forcing the truth out of him. Miki, having pity on him, forces him to go eat okonomiyaki with her. After this "sour" and "seaweedy" experience, Yamato realizes that Miki was just cheering him up, and resolves to stay on track to meet everyone's expectations.
21	"Regret"; Transliteration: "Kōkai" (Japanese: 後悔)	Kahoru Igusa	Yuka Yamada	November 24, 2005
Although Yamato resolves to stay on track, he just can't seem to be able to catch the baton, repeatedly dropping it. To help Yamato, Miki decides to take matters into her own hands and train Yamato. After many hours of practice, Yamato still fails to receive the baton properly, due to Suzuka occupying his thoughts the moment of reception. Eventually, Yamato reveals that his poor performance is due to his regret of lying to Suzuka. Miki offers to talk to Suzuka about it, but Yamato declines the offer, stating that he should stop making excuses and talk to her himself. Yamato tells the truth to Suzuka and reveals how valuable her friendship is to him. Suzuka later calls him to say she is not angry anymore and encourages him to work hard at the track.
22	"Preparation"; Transliteration: "Kakugo" (Japanese: 覚悟)	Minoru Yamaoka	Michiko Itō	December 1, 2005
Before the race, Yamato receives counseling from Yasunobu, revealing that he still likes Suzuka. The appearance of Miyamoto and his recount of Kazuki then reveals to Yasunobu what Yamato keeps worrying about. Somehow, though, Yasunobu's words sparks something in Yamato, and he then resolves to becoming first. After his first spectacular performance, he is met by disappointment by his teammates, because the first race was unimportant, he was just wasting energy. When he finishes second in the entire meet, Suzuka approaches to congratulate him, but he reveals to her that he wants first.
23	"Encouragement"; Transliteration: "Gekirei" (Japanese: 激励)	Shigeru Kimiya	Michiko Itō	December 8, 2005
Yamato works hard at track. Miyamoto and Yamato develop a plan to beat Arima. When Miki wonders what has gotten into Yamato lately, he replies that he has a goal now. Miki guesses it is because of Suzuka. Sakurai later calls Nana for advice about Yamato and what to do. Sakurai tells her that she thinks that Yamato and Suzuka like each other and that there is no place for her anymore. Nana comforts her, telling her to find someone else. Suzuka is increasingly bothered by Yamato's seriousness at track, and acts cold to him. Yamato confronts Suzuka about this, and she apologizes.
24	"Disappearance"; Transliteration: "Shissō" (Japanese: 失踪)	Ayumi Ishihara	Yuka Yamada	December 15, 2005
At the meet, Yamato is very pumped about the race Miyamoto and the captain, however, are worried about how he'll do – Miyamoto notes that Yamato hasn't bested his record from the earlier track meet. During the race, Yamato gets a good start, but Arima quickly passes him. Arima ends up winning, and Yamato places a disappointing fourth place. Later, Suzuka visits Yamato, bringing him some eggs to eat. Yamato realizes that Suzuka is probably trying to cheer him up. Just as she is about to leave, Yamato confesses to her again. He says that she doesn't have to answer him yet, that he will practice more, so that he can win the next tournament. Reminded of what Kazuki told her back then, Suzuka runs out on him, telling him to stop.
25	"Loss"; Transliteration: "Sōshitsu" (Japanese: 喪失)	Hiroshi Ishiodori	Hiroko Tokita	December 22, 2005
While Suzuka is sitting in front of the shrine, it is revealed to us exactly how Kazuki dies. Eventually, Honoka finds her in front of her shrine, and sits down to talk to her. Honoka ends up yelling at Suzuka, because Suzuka refuses to accept Yamato, afraid to get in a relationship. Suzuka tells her that she doesn't know how it feels to lose a loved one, which Honoka counters by telling her that she doesn't know how it feels to have your loved one stolen from you. Eventually, Suzuka runs away, and Yamato comes to the shrine. Honoka, feeling defeated, tells Yamato where Suzuka is. When Yamato gets there, he argues with Suzuka a bit more, eventually forcing a kiss on her. Afterwards she slapped him several times.
26	"Cool Wind"; Transliteration: "Ryōfū" (Japanese: 涼風)	Hiromichi Matano	Hiroko Tokita	December 29, 2005
After Suzuka gets home, she ponders her conflicted feelings and stares at her photo of Kazuki. The next day, Miki, seeing how hard Yamato is trying, tries to convince Suzuka to face Yamato, telling her of his feelings. The next day, Honoka persuades Suzuka to walk home with her. She convinces Suzuka to talk to Yamato, telling her to not keep him waiting. When Yamato learns from Miho that Suzuka is going back home to visit a grave, he rushes upstairs to tell Suzuka to stop visiting Kazuki's grave. To his surprise, she asks him to come along. There, Suzuka confesses her feelings for Yamato in front of Kazuki's grave. Their "new relationship" begins with them walking to school together.

== Music ==
Opening Themes
#	Transcription/Translation	Performed by	Episodes
	Start Line	COACH☆ (English version by Kristine Sa)	All

Ending themes
#	Transcription/Translation	Performed by	Episodes
1	Aoi FIELD	COACH☆ (English version by Kristine Sa)	1-14
2	Kimi no Koto (君のこと, About You)	COACH☆	15-26
