= List of IGPX episodes =

IGPX: Immortal Grand Prix is an anime television series co-produced by Cartoon Network and Production I.G. For the Japanese version, the opening theme is "Go For It!" performed by Granrodeo while the ending theme is "Believe yourself" performed by Exige. The ending theme for the American Toonami version is "Strings" performed by Tommy Guerrero.

== Series overview ==
Season	Episodes	Originally released	
Season	Episodes	First released	Last released
1	13	October 5, 2005	January 18, 2006
2	13	January 25, 2006	July 2, 2006

== Episodes ==
=== Season 1 (2005–06) ===
No. overall	No. in season	Title	Directed by (Note: Information is taken from the ending credits of each episode.)	Written by	Storyboarded by	Original release date	English air date
1	1	"Time to Shine"; Transliteration: "Kagayaki no Toki" (Japanese: 輝きの時)	Mitsuru Hongo	Mitsuru Hongo	Mitsuru Hongo, Hiroyuki Nishimura	October 5, 2005	November 5, 2005
2	2	"Win... or Lose"; Transliteration: "Katsu ka, Makeru ka" (Japanese: 勝つか、負けるか)	Yoshitaka Koyama	Mitsuru Hongo	Hiroyuki Nishimura	October 12, 2005	November 5, 2005
3	3	"Black Egg"; Transliteration: "Kuroi Tamago" (Japanese: 黒い卵)	Shunsuke Tada	Hiroyuki Nishimura	Shunsuke Tada	October 19, 2005	November 12, 2005
4	4	"The Ghost"; Transliteration: "Kōtei no na no Shita ni" (Japanese: 皇帝の名の下に)	Masakazu Hashimoto	Mitsuru Hongo	Mitsuru Hongo, Tsuneo Kobayashi	October 26, 2005	November 19, 2005
5	5	"Come Together"; Transliteration: "Warera, Tsudou Toki" (Japanese: 我等、集う時)	Mitsuru Hongo	Hiroyuki Nishimura	Hiroyuki Nishimura	November 2, 2005	November 26, 2005
6	6	"Cat vs. Dog"; Transliteration: "Neko bāsasu Ken" (Japanese: 猫VS犬)	Yoshitaka Koyama	Mitsuru Hongo	Harumi Katayama	November 9, 2005	December 3, 2005
7	7	"Spring Has Come"; Transliteration: "Haru ga Kita" (Japanese: 春が来た)	Shunsuke Tada	Makiko Asano	Shunsuke Tada	November 16, 2005	December 10, 2005
8	8	"I Like You, I Like You, I Love You"; Transliteration: "Suki Suki Daisuki" (Japanese: 好き好き大好き)	Masakazu Hashimoto	Hiroyuki Nishimura	Hiroyuki Nishimura	November 23, 2005	December 17, 2005
9	9	"Holiday"; Transliteration: "Shuuki" (Japanese: 休日)	Yumi Kamakura	Makiko Asano	Yumi Kamakura	November 30, 2005	January 7, 2006
10	10	"Showdown"; Transliteration: "Taiketsu" (Japanese: 対決)	Masakazu Hashimoto	Mitsuru Hongo	Hiroyuki Nishimura	December 7, 2005	January 14, 2006
11	11	"And Then..."; Transliteration: "Soshite..." (Japanese: そして…)	Shunsuke Tada	Mitsuru Hongo	Shunsuke Tada	December 14, 2005	January 21, 2006
12	12	"The Final Battle"; Transliteration: "Saishuu Kessen" (Japanese: 最終決戦)	Toshiyuki Kono	Hiroyuki Nishimura, Mitsuru Hongo	Hiroyuki Nishimura	January 11, 2006	January 28, 2006
13	13	"Into Tomorrow"; Transliteration: "Ashita e" (Japanese: 明日へ、)	Mitsuru Hongo	Mitsuru Hongo	Mitsuru Hongo, Hiroyuki Nishimura	January 18, 2006	February 4, 2006

=== Season 2 (2006) ===
No. overall	No. in season	Title	Directed by	Written by	Storyboarded by	Original release date	English air date
14	1	"A New Challenge"; Transliteration: "Arata naru Chousen" (Japanese: 新たなる挑戦)	Yoshitaka Koyama	Makiko Asano	Yoshitaka Koyama	January 25, 2006	May 20, 2006
15	2	"Feeling Lost"; Transliteration: "Tomadoi" (Japanese: とまどい)	Masakazu Hashimoto	Makiko Asano	Koichi Hatsumi	February 1, 2006	May 27, 2006
16	3	"Vulnerable Mind"; Transliteration: "Muboubi na Kokoro" (Japanese: 無防備な心)	Toshiyuki Kono	Makiko Asano	Toshiyuki Kono	February 8, 2006	June 3, 2006
17	4	"White Snow"; Transliteration: "Shiroi Yuki" (Japanese: 白い雪)	Masakazu Hashimoto	Mitsuru Hongo	Yumi Kamakura	February 15, 2006	June 10, 2006
18	5	"Puzzled"; Transliteration: "Pazuru Ringusu" (Japanese: パズル・リングス)	Yoshitaka Koyama	Mitsuru Hongo	Yoshitaka Koyama	February 22, 2006	June 17, 2006
19	6	"Moving On"; Transliteration: "Takeshi, Mae e" (Japanese: タケシ、前へ)	Masakazu Hashimoto	Makiko Asano	Tsuneo Kobayashi	March 1, 2006	June 24, 2006
20	7	"Comeback"; Transliteration: "Fukkatsu" (Japanese: 復活)	Toshiyuki Kono	Kuniaki Kasahara	Toshiyuki Kono	March 8, 2006	July 1, 2006
21	8	"Decision"; Transliteration: "Ketsudan" (Japanese: 決断)	Makiko Asano, Mitsuru Hongo	Kuniaki Kasahara, Makiko Asano	Harumi Katayama, Atsushi Takeuchi	March 15, 2006	July 21, 2006
22	9	"Function, Not Fashion"; Transliteration: "Susumu Beki Basho e" (Japanese: 進むべき場所へ)	Masakazu Hashimoto	Makiko Asano	Yoshitaka Koyama	March 22, 2006	July 28, 2006
23	10	"Fate"; Transliteration: "Unmei" (Japanese: 運命)	Yoshitaka Koyama	Mitsuru Hongo	Masayuki Yamaguchi	March 29, 2006	August 4, 2006
24	11	"Winner's Circle"; Transliteration: "Shouri no Yukue" (Japanese: 勝利の行方)	Masakazu Hashimoto	Mitsuru Hongo	Mitsuru Kitaya	March 29, 2006	August 11, 2006
25	12	"Hostile Contradiction"; Transliteration: "Tekitai Teki Mujun" (Japanese: 敵対的矛盾)	Yoshitaka Koyama	Mitsuru Hongo	Tsuneo Kobayashi	June 25, 2006	August 18, 2006
26	13	"The End... and the Beginning"; Transliteration: "Ketsumatsu to, Hajimari" (Japanese: 結末と、始まり)	Mitsuru Hongo	Mitsuru Hongo	Hiroyuki Nishimura	July 2, 2006	August 25, 2006
