= List of Canvas 2: Niji-iro no Sketch episodes =

The first box-set art for Canvas 2, released in region 2

Canvas 2: Niji-iro no Sketch is a 24-episode anime television series directed by Itsuro Kawasaki, based on a Japanese visual novel called Canvas 2: Akane-iro no Palette, which has made transitions into many media other than an anime, such as manga, light novels, and drama CDs. The anime is produced by studio ZEXCS, and aired on Chiba TV, TV Saitama, and others between October 3, 2005, to March 27, 2006. Canvas 2: Niji-iro no Sketch is licensed in North America by Kadokawa Pictures USA. The episodes were sold in two separate box sets, containing twelve episodes each.

The episodes were simulcast on Crunchyroll, an American international online community focused on streaming East Asian media. The episodes are named after various different colors.

The opening theme is "Plastic Smile" by Honey Bee (Yuria), and the ending theme is "NA NA IRO" by Sweets Tankentai.

== Canvas 2: Niji-iro no Sketch (2005–06) ==
No.	Title	Original release date
1	"Classic Red Prohibition"; Transliteration: "Kindan no Kurashikku Reddo" (Japanese: 禁断のクラシックレッド)	October 3, 2005
Hiroki wakes up to find Elis sleeping next to him, leading to them having a playful argument. The next day, one of vases is broken and Mami's drawing is ruined. Hiroki immediately suspects Elis, who instantly denies this. She then begins to criticize the art club, and still calls him "onii-chan", leading to Hiroki telling her not to call him that. Hurt, she runs out the room. After inspecting Elis's painting of blue roses, Hiroki asks the art club members if they saw Elis ruin the drawing, or break the vase and after nobody answers him, he concludes that Elis could not have done it.
2	"Mandarin Orange Reunion"; Transliteration: "Mandarin Orenji no Saikai" (Japanese: マンダリンオレンジの再会)	October 10, 2005
Kiri introduces herself to the students of the school, as she will be working as a teacher. After the assembly, Hiroki has a chat with Elis on a bench, and then walks off into the cafeteria. Kana comes to sit next to him without asking, and Kiri also comes to join them, and insists that Hiroki buys her lunch for a memorable reunion. Later in the gym, Kiri recalls when Hiroki rejected her confession on the rooftop.
3	"Mischievous Canary Yellow"; Transliteration: "Itazurana Kanaria Ierō" (Japanese: 悪戯なカナリアイエロー)	October 17, 2005
While shopping, Elis runs off without Hiroki when she sees balloons being given out, to Hiroki's annoyance. Elis and Hiroki go into a library, where he finds a strange novel, which turns out to be one of Kana's published novels. He decides to buy it, along with all the other books Elis makes him buy. Near the end of the date, Kana and Hiroki almost kiss, leading to Elis running out and exposing herself, as does Kiri.
4	"Cobalt Blue Impatience"; Transliteration: "Shōsō no Kobaruto Burū" (Japanese: 焦燥のコバルトブルー)	October 24, 2005
A new character called Misaki Sumire is introduced.
5	"Moon Gray Sigh"; Transliteration: "Tameiki no Mūngurei" (Japanese: 溜息のムーングレイ)	October 31, 2005
Hiroki reminds a girl feeding a stray cat that she will be late, in a helpful manner. However, this agitates her, causing her to walk off. In art class, Tomoko gets teased due to her gloomy nature, which leads to her tearing up her drawing. Hiroki realizes that being a teacher is not as easy as it looks. The girls in class continue to tease Hiroki, leading to Elis dragging him off to the cafeteria with her.
6	"Emerald Green Temptation"; Transliteration: "Yūwaku no Emerarudo Gurīn" (Japanese: 誘惑のエメラルドグリーン)	November 7, 2005
The class goes on a school trip to the beach and Hiroki was asked to guide the students just two days ago before the trip, Kiri is also a guide for the trip. Later, Misaki tells everyone that she has a fear of height and cannot use the ropeway to the mountain, but Kiri goes hard on her and made her go by the ropeway. Hiroki and Kiri go to look for the shrine to choose a course for the fear trial; there Hiroki tells Kiri that she does not need to talk to him formally.
7	"Sand Beige Sea Roar"; Transliteration: "Shiosai no Sando Bēju" (Japanese: 潮騒のサンドベージュ)	November 14, 2005
Elis and Tomoko sleep near other overnight the trip, and Elis talks to Tomoko about Hiroki and Kiri's relationship as childhood friends. In the test of courage, Elis pairs with Shouta, and Hiroki with Kiri.
8	"Midnight Blue Sadness"; Transliteration: "Aishū no Middonaito Burū" (Japanese: 哀愁のミッドナイトブルー)	November 21, 2005
In a turn of events, Elis wakes Hiroki up so he can accompany her in buying her a yukata. On their way, they meet Kiri then Hagino, Takeuchi, Sumire and Tokomo not long after. Hiroki then leaves the job of choosing the girls' yukatas to Kiri soon after. When Kiri tries to find a ribbon for Elis's yukata, an object falls out of the closet, which happens to be a portrait of Kiri done by Hiroki years ago.
9	"Sentimental Azure"; Transliteration: "Ruri-iro no Senchimentaru" (Japanese: 瑠璃色のセンチメンタル)	November 28, 2005
Elis put an all-nighter to make a painting for an art competition and Hiroki went to meet Kiri at a restaurant to get a book from her to practice for his public official exams. When he return from the restaurant Elis saw the book in his hands and thinks that he was studying for his exams.
10	"Snow White Recollections"; Transliteration: "Tsuioku no Sunō Howaito" (Japanese: 追憶のスノーホワイト)	December 4, 2005
11	"Light Yellow Distance"; Transliteration: "Asa Sasō ko no Kyori" (Japanese: 浅支子の距離)	December 12, 2005
12	"Evergreen Innocence"; Transliteration: "Mujakina Ebāgurīn" (Japanese: 無邪気なエバーグリーン)	December 19, 2005
13	"Sepia Triangle"; Transliteration: "Sepia no Toraianguru" (Japanese: セピアのトライアングル)	January 9, 2006
14	"Dark Navy Secret"; Transliteration: "Himegoto wa Dāku Neibī" (Japanese: ひめごとはダークネイビー)	January 16, 2006
15	"Indigo Blue Pressure"; Transliteration: "Aiiro no Puresshā" (Japanese: 藍色のプレッシャー)	January 23, 2006
16	"Light Purple All Night Long"; Transliteration: "Usumurasaki no Ōru Naito Rongu" (Japanese: 薄紫のオールナイトロング)	January 30, 2006
17	"Want to Deliver Cherry Pink"; Transliteration: "Cherī Pinku o Todoketai" (Japanese: チェリーピンクを届けたい)	February 6, 2006
18	"Shoot at Tomato Red!"; Transliteration: "Tomato Reddo o Ute!" (Japanese: トマトレッドを撃て!)	February 13, 2006
19	"A Milky White Night"; Transliteration: "Mirukyi Howaito no Ichiya" (Japanese: ミルキィホワイトの一夜)	February 20, 2006
20	"Marmalade Colored Evening"; Transliteration: "Māmarēdo-iro no Yūgure" (Japanese: マーマレード色の夕暮れ)	February 27, 2006
21	"Crystal Blank Map"; Transliteration: "Kurisutaru no Hakuchizu" (Japanese: クリスタルの白地図)	March 6, 2006
22	"On An Indigo Dawn"; Transliteration: "Indigo no Yoake ni" (Japanese: インディゴの夜明けに)	March 13, 2006
23	"Christmas Colored Decision"; Transliteration: "Kurisumasu karā no Ketsui" (Japanese: クリスマスカラーの決意)	March 20, 2006
24	"Rainbow Colored Finale"; Transliteration: "Nijiiro (Nana Iro) no Fināre" (Japanese: 虹色(なないろ)のフィナーレ)	March 27, 2006
On the night before Elis's flight to Paris, Hiroki finds a painting that Elis leaves for him. Upon seeing the painting, which contained the color red, Hiroki realizes his true feeling for Elis and picks up his brush to start painting, having been inspired by Elis. At the airport, Tokomo decides to go on ahead, leaving the others. In a race against time, Hagino and Sumire try to prevent Elis from leaving just yet while Takeuchi finds Hiroki. Their efforts prove successful as Hiroki arrives at the airport just in time.
