= List of Blood+ episodes =

Japanese cover for the first limited edition DVD volume of the series

Blood+ is an anime television series produced by Production I.G. It premiered in Japan on October 8, 2005, on MBS and TBS, and continued with new episodes weekly (except on December 31, 2005) until September 23, 2006. The series simultaneously aired on Animax, Sony's Japanese anime satellite television channel, with its networks in Southeast Asia and South Asia airing the series later. The series was directed by Junichi Fujisaku and features original character designs by Chizu Hashii.

Through Sony's international division, Blood+ is licensed for distribution in multiple regions, including Region 1. It began airing English dubbed in the United States on March 11, 2007, on Adult Swim, where it ran until its conclusion on March 23, 2008. The first Region 1 DVDs were released on March 4, 2008, with a simultaneous release of a single five-episode volume and a twenty-five episode box set.

The series was first released to Region 2 DVD in Japan by Aniplex in thirteen volumes. The first volume contained two episodes, and each subsequent volume contained four more. The first volume was released December 21, 2005, and the final on December 29, 2006. All of the volumes have Japanese language tracks with no subtitles. The first Region 1 DVDs were released on March 4, 2008, with a simultaneous release of a single five episode volume and a twenty-five episode box set.

Sony Entertainment began releasing its English adaptation of the series on March 4, 2008. Sony released two versions simultaneously: an individual volume containing the first five episodes, and a six disc special edition set containing the first 25 episodes and several exclusive extras. The second box set, containing the remaining 25 episodes and more extras, was released on October 20, 2009

The first opening theme song is "The Tears of the Blue Sky" (青空のナミダ, Aozora no Namida) performed by Hitomi Takahashi, while the first ending theme song is "The Things I Pass Down" (語り継ぐこと, Kataritsugu Koto) performed by Chitose Hajime. The second opening theme song is "Season's Call" performed by Hyde, while the second ending theme song is "Cry No More" performed by Mika Nakashima. The third opening theme song is "Colors of the Heart" performed by Uverworld, while the third ending theme song is "This Love" performed by Angela Aki. The final opening theme song is "Raion" (雷音) performed by Jinn, while the final ending theme song is "Brand New Map" performed by K. For the series finale, "The Things I Pass Down" is used for the closing sequence.

== Episodes ==
No.	Title	Directed by	Written by	Animation directed by	Original release date	English air date
Okinawa, Japan
1	"First Kiss"; Transliteration: "Fāsuto Kisu" (Japanese: ファーストキス)	Jun Matsumoto	Junichi Fujisaku	Akiharu Ishii	October 8, 2005	March 11, 2007
Saya Otonashi is a fairly normal high school girl, except that she has no memory of her life before a year ago and needs regular blood transfusions to stay healthy. She encounters a mysterious man playing a cello whose song triggers a vague memory. When Saya goes to the school that night to retrieve her forgotten shoes, the cello player approaches her holding a dagger. Saya flees and runs into a teacher, Mr. Inamine, who is then killed by a monster. Saya runs into the school, locking the door behind her, but the monster easily breaks through. The cello player appears and fights off the monster before grabbing Saya and taking her to safety in a classroom. There he tells her the monster is a chiropteran. Meanwhile, her brother Kai arrives to retrieve her after her friend Kaori brings her shoes to their house, and also encounters the monster. The man kisses Saya, forcing her to drink his blood. He tells her "You must fight now."
2	"Magic Words"; Transliteration: "Mahō no Kotoba" (Japanese: 魔法の言葉)	Directed by : Jun Takahashi; Storyboarded by : Tomohiko Itō	Yutaka Oomatsu	Minoru Ueda	October 15, 2005	March 18, 2007
Under some sort of mindset, Saya laces a sword provided by the cello player with her blood, then strikes and kills the chiropteran before it can attack Kai. Saya awakens from her trance and, seeing her blood-stained self in a reflection, screams "NO!" and faints. The man carries Saya and Kai to safety as American soldiers flood the school. When Saya wakes up in the hospital, she has no memory of what happened. David tells George what happened at the school, and rebukes him for being so attached to Saya that he doesn't want to let "them" have her back. Saya starts having flashbacks about the events at the school and goes down to find her father. Overhearing the conversation, she gets upset and runs away from the hospital. At the beach, she meets the cello player again. She asks who and what she is. The man says he will tell her, but before he can, Kai finds her and forces the cellist to leave.
3	"The Place Where it All Began"; Transliteration: "Hajimari no Basho" (Japanese: はじまりの場所)	Directed by : Tomoaki Ohta; Storyboarded by : Susumu Kudo	Yoshiki Sakurai	Shinichi Miyamae	October 22, 2005	March 25, 2007
David has given George a deadline to give Saya back to the Red Shield. George takes Saya to his family grave to tell what happened to her one year ago. After returning, they are attacked by another chiropteran, formerly a man by the name of Forest, and George is fatally wounded.
4	"Dangerous Boy"; Transliteration: "Abunai Shōnen" (Japanese: アブない少年)	Directed by : Akiko Honda; Storyboarded by : Yasakichi	Shōtarō Suga	Tōru Ōkubo	October 29, 2005	April 8, 2007
George, having been attacked by a chiropteran and is severely wounded, is currently in the hospital. Kai leaves with his father's handgun to track down the monster, yearning for revenge. The cello player appears again before Saya, and finally introduces himself as Haji.
5	"Beyond the Dark Forest"; Transliteration: "Kurai Mori no Mukō e" (Japanese: 暗い森のむこうへ)	Directed by : Takashi Sano; Storyboarded by : Kiyoko Sayama	Midori Gotō	Yūichi Nakazawa & Naoko Nakamoto	November 5, 2005	April 15, 2007
George has been transferred secretly to a hidden facility in Yanbaru (Nago), Northern Okinawa, under the authority of the American forces there.
6	"My Father's Hands"; Transliteration: "Otōsan no Te" (Japanese: おとうさんの手)	Directed by : Yasunori Urata; Storyboarded by : Tetsuo Isamu	Shigeru Morita	Toyoaki Fukushima	November 12, 2005	April 22, 2007
David, Saya, and Haji infiltrate the Yanbaru Center to rescue George. Meanwhile, the Commander of the U.S. Forces in Okinawa has authorized a surgical bombing of Yanbaru to remove any incriminating evidence. David, Saya, and Haji are suddenly attacked by a chiropteran. George appears and assists the group with combating the monster. Kai arrives later with news that the place is going to be bombed. After being injured by a chirpoteran, George starts turning into one of them; Saya, however, mixes her blood with his so that he can die as a human.
7	"I Must Do It"; Transliteration: "Watashi ga Yaranakya" (Japanese: 私がやらなきゃ)	Directed by : Shigeki Awai; Storyboarded by : Kazuyoshi Takeuchi	Junichi Fujisaku	Shinichi Miyamae	November 19, 2005	April 29, 2007
Saya and her brothers are still shocked by the death of their father. Saya asks Haji about her past. He tells her he can't currently say, as she cannot yet fully accept and understand the truth.
Vietnam
8	"Phantom of the School"; Transliteration: "Fantomu・obu・za・Sukūru" (Japanese: ファントム・オブ・ザ・スクール)	Directed by : Akiko Honda; Storyboarded by : Yasakichi	Reiko Yoshida	Tōru Ōkubo	November 26, 2005	May 6, 2007
Saya is given an assignment to infiltrate a Vietnamese boarding school. Haji goes undercover as the gardener. Saya learns about the "Phantom", who later attacks her. She believes he is a chiropteran but is somehow different than the others.
9	"Rainbow for Each"; Transliteration: "Sorezore no Niji" (Japanese: それぞれの虹)	Kiyoko Sayama	Shōtarō Suga	Naoyoshi Shiotani	December 3, 2005	May 13, 2007
Left behind by David, Kai and Riku are searching for Saya in Hanoi. Riku and his new friend, Mui, get captured along with Kai.
10	"I Want to See You"; Transliteration: "Anata ni Aitai" (Japanese: あなたに会いたい)	Takashi Sano	Shigeru Morita	Toshimitsu Kobayashi	December 10, 2005	May 20, 2007
Saya goes to the forbidden garden and finds blue roses and a mysterious container. Later, she sees pictures of the Vietnam War resulting in flashbacks of her past. While being attacked by the Phantom once again, Saya finally accepts her past.
11	"After the Dance"; Transliteration: "Dansu no Ato de" (Japanese: ダンスのあとで)	Directed by : Naomichi Yamato; Storyboarded by : Tamaki Nakatsu	Yoshiki Sakurai	Minoru Ueda	December 17, 2005	May 27, 2007
David and Julia are making use of the opportunity provided by the annual ball held in the boarding school to search for the mysterious container somehow connected to the events in Vietnam 30 years ago. Meanwhile, Saya dances with a charming stranger. Karl, who is the Phantom, attacks them later. David figures out the container holds Diva and they go after it.
12	"Lured by the White Mist"; Transliteration: "Shiroi Kiri ni Sasowarete" (Japanese: 白い霧にさそわれて)	Directed by : Naoyasu Habu; Storyboarded by : Susumu Kudo	Shōtarō Suga	Junko Watanabe	December 24, 2005	June 10, 2007
The Red Shield has tracked the container to a secret research farm in the Vietnamese jungle. Once they get there, they are attacked by a chiropteran.
13	"Jungle Paradise"; Transliteration: "Janguru・Paradaisu" (Japanese: ジャングル・パラダイス)	Directed by : Yasunori Urata; Storyboarded by : Yū Kō	Shōtarō Suga	Toyoaki Fukushima	January 7, 2006	June 17, 2007
Under the mysterious influence of Diva, Saya starts to attack friends and foes alike just like 30 years ago. Kai stops Saya by yelling her name, causing her to regain control of herself. Solomon and Van escape with Diva while Saya fights Karl.
Okinawa, Japan
14	"The Last Sunday"; Transliteration: "Saigo no Nichiyōbi" (Japanese: さいごの日曜日)	Directed by : Kazuhiro Ozawa; Storyboarded by : Tokiichi Kagurazaka	Reiko Yoshida	Shinji Ochi	January 14, 2006	June 24, 2007
The Miyagusuku family returns to Okinawa to say goodbye to their friends.
15	"I Want to Pursue!"; Transliteration: "Oikaketai no!" (Japanese: おいかけたいの!)	Tetsuya Kobayashi	Shigeru Morita	Yūichi Nakazawa & Naoko Nakamoto	January 21, 2006	July 1, 2007
Ever since returning from Vietnam, journalist Akihiro Okamura is getting more and more obsessed about the events surrounding Saya and his father's encounter with a chiropteran near the Laos border 30 years ago. He is unable to continue his research until he gets unexpected help.
Russia
16	"Siberian Express"; Transliteration: "Shiberian・Ekusupuresu" (Japanese: シベリアン・エクスプレス)	Directed by : Naomichi Yamato; Storyboarded by : Hitomu Kumoi	Kurasumi Sunayama	Minoru Ueda	January 28, 2006	July 8, 2007
David, Saya, and others enter the Russian port of Vladivostok to board the Trans-Siberian express heading for Ekaterinburg, where a key scientist in chiropteran research was last seen. Before boarding they meet a Red Shield member named Liza. She is later killed by Amshel, who then takes on her appearance. Two chiropterans appear on the train while en route.
17	"Do you Remember the Promise?"; Transliteration: "Yakusoku Oboeteru?" (Japanese: 約束おぼえてる?)	Directed by : Ken Ando; Storyboarded by : Naomichi Yamato	Junichi Fujisaku	Minoru Yamazawa	February 4, 2006	July 15, 2007
Riku is pulled off the train by one of the chiropterans; Hagi and Saya jump off to rescue him. Saya has a dream about her past in 1920s Russia with Hagi, tracking down Rasputin and Diva, who was disguised as Grand Duchess Anastasia.
18	"Moon Over Ekaterinburg"; Transliteration: "Ekaterinburugu no Tsuki" (Japanese: エカテリンブルグの月)	Directed by : Akiko Honda; Storyboarded by : Yasakichi	Shōtarō Suga	Tōru Ōkubo	February 11, 2006	July 22, 2007
David, Lewis, and Kai's search for a defected Delta-67 scientist leads them to an abandoned nuclear facility called Sverdlovsk-51. Hagi, Saya, and Riku have reached Tyumen and board another train to reach Ekaterinburg.
19	"Broken Heart"; Transliteration: "Oreta Kokoro" (Japanese: 折れたココロ)	Directed by : Naoyasu Habu; Storyboarded by : Shin Matsuo	Shigeru Morita	Shinichi Miyamae	February 18, 2006	July 29, 2007
Saya, Riku, and Hagi arrive at Ekaterinburg to rendezvous with David. Suddenly, Riku falls ill. Amshel (disguised as Liza) questions Saya about her true intentions for fighting the chiropterans.
France
20	"Chevalier"; Transliteration: "Shuvarie" (Japanese: シュヴァリエ)	Nanako Shimazaki	Yoshiki Sakurai	Hiroyoshi Iida	February 25, 2006	August 5, 2007
David and the others arrive at the Red Shield headquarters. Kai learns the truth about Saya from Joel's diary. In France, Amshel, Solomon, James, and Nathan discuss Saya's fate.
21	"Sour Grapes"; Transliteration: "Suppai Budō" (Japanese: すっぱいブドウ)	Kiyoko Sayama	Kurasumi Sunayama	Kyoko Kotani	March 4, 2006	August 12, 2007
Okamura and Mao are looking for clues about the '67 vintage wine in Chateau Duel. Saya and Hagi find themselves hunted by a group of artificial chiropterans known as The Schiff.
22	"The Zoo"; Transliteration: "Dōbutsuen" (Japanese: 動物園)	Directed by : Man Kawasaki; Storyboarded by : Takashi Sano	Reiko Yoshida	Toshimitsu Kobayashi	March 11, 2006	August 19, 2007
Saya visits the ruins of Joel's mansion, known as "the Zoo". There, she recalls her first encounter with Hagi.
23	"Two Chevaliers"; Transliteration: "Futari no Shuvarie" (Japanese: ふたりのシュヴァリエ)	Ei Aoki	Shōtarō Suga	Toyoaki Fukushima	March 18, 2006	September 2, 2007
David and the others arrive at the Zoo. Solomon confronts Saya with his side of the story and tries to convince her to join him.
24	"Airy Singing Voice"; Transliteration: "Karoyaka Naru Utagoe" (Japanese: 軽やかなる歌声)	Directed by : Shigeru Ueda; Storyboarded by : Shingo Kaneko & Naomichi Yamato	Shigeru Morita	Yoshiya Yamamoto & Ruriko Watanabe	March 25, 2006	September 9, 2007
Saya confronts Diva after Riku is lured into the bell tower by Diva's singing.
25	"The Red Shield"; Transliteration: "Akai Tate" (Japanese: 赤い盾)	Directed by : Toshikatsu Tokoro; Storyboarded by : Naoyasu Habu	Reiko Yoshida	Shinichi Miyamae	April 1, 2006	September 16, 2007
Okamura and Mao arrive at The Zoo only to find the end of a broken sword left behind. Saya returns to the Red Shield headquarters with Riku, who is wounded.
26	"Those Who Serve Saya"; Transliteration: "Saya ni Shitagau Mono" (Japanese: サヤに従うもの)	Jun Takahashi	Kurasumi Sunayama	Kōji Komurakata	April 8, 2006	September 23, 2007
Riku's eyes are now open and he is wondering about his current condition, including his incessant thoughts of Saya and his unquenchable thirst. Kai tries to make him eat to prove to himself that Riku is not a chiropteran or Saya's chevalier, but a human. However, Riku is unable to eat much and can't get to sleep at night. The Schiff attack the ship and Riku is injured by one during the fight. After seeing Riku is now Saya's second Chevalier, they flee as Riku burns with pain from needing blood. Kai allows Riku to feed on him and is thanked sorrowfully by Riku for doing so.
27	"Paris, Je t'Aime"; Transliteration: "Pari・Jutēmu" (Japanese: パリ・ジュテーム)	Directed by : Naomichi Yamato; Storyboarded by : Hitomu Kumoi	Shōtarō Suga	Tōru Ōkubo	April 15, 2006	October 7, 2007
In Paris, Kai is recovering from letting Riku drink his blood and finds a member of the Schiff named Irène. After saving her from local street punks, Kai is told about her and the other Schiff's past.
28	"Limited Existence"; Transliteration: "Kagiri Aru Mono" (Japanese: 限りあるもの)	Tadahito Matsubayashi	Shigeru Morita	Kazuhiro Takamura	April 22, 2006	October 14, 2007
While the Red Shield is preparing for another attack by The Schiff, Okamura and Mao suddenly appear.
29	"Cursed Blood"; Transliteration: "Norowareta Chi" (Japanese: 呪われた血)	Directed by : Akiko Honda; Storyboarded by : Tatsufumi Tamagawa, Jun Matsumoto & Akiko Honda	Michiko Yokote	Kyoko Kotani	April 29, 2006	October 21, 2007
After The Schiff's attack, Saya agrees to share her blood with Irène. After drinking her blood, Irène's body crystallizes and shatters. The Schiff realize that they have been lied to and that it is Diva's blood they need to survive. They leave, taking most of Irène's pieces with them. Saya and Kai mourn Irène's death.
30	"Joel's Diary"; Transliteration: "Joeru no Nikki" (Japanese: ジョエルの日記)	Yoriyasu Kogawa	Kurasumi Sunayama	Yutaka Matsubara	May 6, 2006	October 28, 2007
Saya visits Joel's Room at Red Shield headquarters and learns about her and Diva's beginnings as well as the 1972 tragedy in Vietnam from Joel's diary.
31	"Breaking Shield"; Transliteration: "Koware Yuku Tate" (Japanese: 壊れゆく盾)	Directed by : Yukio Kuroda; Storyboarded by : Naomichi Yamato	Reiko Yoshida	Masayuki Nomoto	May 13, 2006	November 4, 2007
While Saya, Kai, Riku, and Hagi go on an outing, Riku tries to repair Saya and Kai's broken relationship. In the meantime, Diva is bored with her toys and demands Carl bring her "that boy," while Dr. Collins and Julia meet with Van about their research into chiropterans. Solomon meets with David and warns him that Diva's chevaliers plan to launch an all-out attack on Red Shield headquarters in three days, and asks him to take Saya to safety. When David asks why, Solomon says it is because he doesn't want Saya to die. Solomon also reveals that the Red Shield has been betrayed from within. David quickly takes Saya and the others back to the ship, leaving Okamura and Mao behind. Solomon and the other chevaliers discover that Carl and Diva have disappeared, much to the anger of Amshel who knew Carl should never be Diva's "babysiter". Dr. Collins reveals to Julia that he doesn't think the chiropterans should be completely destroyed and that he knows about the planned attack on the headquarters. While the Red Shield prepares for the coming attack, Riku convinces Kai to play catch with Saya, which helps them finally return to normal. As they stand on the deck, Saya and Riku hear Diva singing just before Carl (as the phantom) and Diva attack the ship. As Carl begins killing the Red Shield operatives, Diva wonders where "that boy" is.
32	"Boy Meets Girl"; Transliteration: "Bōi・Mītsu・Gāru" (Japanese: ボーイ・ミーツ・ガール)	Susumu Kudo	Shōtarō Suga	Toyoaki Fukushima, Akiharu Ishii & Hiroyoshi Iida	May 20, 2006	November 11, 2007
Saya and Hagi search for Diva as Kai and Riku go to join David. Kai hears men screaming and goes to investigate, leaving Riku alone on one of the decks. He can hear Diva calling for him, but Kai returns and they head to the conference room. Saya finds Carl, but leaves Hagi to deal with him and so she can continue looking for Diva. Kai and Riku join some of the operatives at an elevator that will take them to the conference room, but Diva is in it when it arrives. Kai grabs Riku and runs, taking refuge in a storage room, while the men try to stop Diva. Saya finds the men's bodies, but Carl appears again and she's forced to fight him. Joel and David agree to activate the ship's self-destruct sequence to try to entomb Diva in it. Kai and Riku hear the warning about the self-destruct sequence, but Diva finds them. Kai shoots her, but she instantly heals and she knocks him away, leaving him barely conscious while Diva approaches Riku. Saya and Carl's battle takes them to the same room, where Diva is holding Kai and threatening to give him her blood. Saya stabs her, but as she forgot to add her blood to her sword, Diva just laughs and shoves her away. When she falls, Saya spots Riku's naked, cracking body nearby; Diva taunts Saya that she gave him her blood in return for raping him. As Hagi holds off Carl, Kai and Saya watch helplessly as Riku's body shatters completely. David and Lewis find them and lead them back to the ship deck. They try to seal Diva and Carl in the ship's hold, but they easily break out and Carl seriously wounds Joel. Saya and Hagi stay to fight them while the others get away to safety. As Kai watches from the departing helicopter, the ship explodes.
United Kingdom
33	"The Power of Believing"; Transliteration: "Shinjiru Chikara" (Japanese: 信じるチカラ)	Directed by : Kenichi Hamazaki; Storyboarded by : Takashi Sano	Shigeru Morita	Toshimitsu Kobayashi & Naoko Nakamoto	May 27, 2006	November 18, 2007
One year has passed since Riku's death and the destruction of the Red Shield headquarters. Kai, Lewis, and David are now in London, living at a shelter for war orphans run by Gray, an ex-military man and David's former instructor. Kai now wears the crystal chunk from Riku's body around his neck in the form of a diamond-shaped pendant. Devastated by the events and with his spirit broken, David lives in a drunken stupor. Joel, who must use a wheelchair after the injury Carl inflicted upon him, brings Kai some special bullets they hope will be able to kill chiropterans. He also reveals that Julia is in the United States with Collins. Joel thinks David hates him for what happened and he blames himself for Riku's death. Kai tells him he is determined to stop Diva and her chevaliers, and that he must do all that he can until Saya returns. Gray lectures David on his wallowing in self-pity when Kai has turned his loss into his strength and found his purpose. Later, Kai pours out all of David's alcohol, asking him what he would say to those who died. David says it is pointless without Saya, and Kai yells at him that it is his job to wait for her. Meanwhile, in the US, James and Van give a demonstration of their new soldiers, the Corpse Corps. Three of the soldiers kill a single chiropteran, and Dr. Collins tells Julia they don't need Saya anymore. The U.S. agrees to use them. As the Corpse Corps are transported, several members of The Schiff watch from the shadows. That night, Kai and Lewis are out hunting chiropterans, but the new bullets do not work. As they find themselves surrounded by three chiropterans, Saya and Hagi appear.
34	"World Where We Exist"; Transliteration: "Oretachi no Iru Sekai" (Japanese: 俺たちのいる世界)	Directed by : Norihiko Nagahama; Storyboarded by : Tokiichi Kagurazaka	Michiko Yokote	Yoshiya Yamamoto	June 3, 2006	November 25, 2007
Saya saves Kai and Lewis from the chiropterans, but collapses afterwards. They take her back to Gray's house to recover. David learns Saya is at the farm, but doesn't react. When Monique touches the sleeping Saya, Saya pops awake and almost attacks her. She barely acknowledges Kai's presence and calls Hagi to leave. Gray won't let her leave while she's still weak, though, and manages to get her to stay for breakfast. Kai tells her about David, but she cuts him off telling him it isn't relevant to her and that he should go back to Okinawa. Hagi finds David throwing up behind a building and asks if he's given up fighting. While they talk, a chiropteran attacks the farm, having followed Saya's scent. It gets upstairs and goes after Monique. Kai shoots at it but is knocked aside. David also shoots at it, and is attacked. Saya, unable to find her sword, attacks it with a kitchen knife coated in her blood and kills it, then leaves with Hagi. As they walk through London, they spot an advertisement for a performance by Diva, who has changed her appearance to look similar to Riku. David and Kai also see the ad on TV.
35	"Tomorrow Without Hope"; Transliteration: "Kibō no Nai Ashita" (Japanese: 希望のない明日)	Naoyasu Habu	Reiko Yoshida	Shinichi Miyamae	June 10, 2006	December 2, 2007
James uses the Corpse Corps to attack The Schiff. During the battle, it is revealed that they are "improved" clones of Moses. The Schiff, already suffering from Thorn, are being badly beaten. Lulu manages to escape and runs to where Saya and Hagi are resting in a church. Lulu begs her to help them before collapsing from her own wounds. Saya agrees to go, but when they arrive at the warehouse, Dahz is dead, and Gudrif dies shortly afterwards. Only Moses, Karman, and Lulu are left. James reports back to Amshel that he wasn't able to kill all of The Schiff, but Amshel says it is no problem. Amshel puts James in charge of killing Saya despite Carl's objections. That night, the last three members of The Schiff bury their comrades. Lulu asks Saya if she will fight with them to defeat Diva, but Saya says she fights alone, and will not grieve the loss of anymore comrades. Lulu tells her she has lost her hope. She also tells her where Diva will be. As Lulu leaves, she asks Saya to please remember her, because she doesn't want to be forgotten. The three Schiff members go to the museum and again fight the Corpse Corps. They are losing when Saya and Hagi arrives. When Saya destroys one of the Corpse Corps; the other two retreat. Moses, Karman, and Lulu pledge to go with Saya, not as help, but because it is the only way they can survive. Meanwhile, David goes to see Joel, sober and no longer drinking. Joel tells him he wants to revive the Red Shield. He later meets with Okamura and Mao and asks them to find out who is sponsoring Diva's upcoming concert.
36	"Mismatched Feelings"; Transliteration: "Surechigau Omoi" (Japanese: すれちがう想い)	Directed by : Akiko Honda; Storyboarded by : Nanako Shimazaki, Akiko Honda & Tōru Ōkubo	Kurasumi Sunayama	Tōru Ōkubo	June 17, 2006	December 9, 2007
James and Diva leave to go to a luncheon, but Diva gets him to take her to the Royal Convent Garden so she can sing. David meets with Mao and Okamura who tell him that Diva's opera is being jointly sponsored by Cinq Fleches and Goldsmith Holdings, that the two companies have partnered to produce food for the military forces across the countries. They also have a research facility on the outskirts of London that is headed up by Van. David uses a stolen ID to infiltrate the lab where he discovers Julia and learns a little more about the research being done. He's almost captured by Van who remembered David from Vietnam, but David instead uses Van as a hostage to escape. At the opera house, Saya, Hagi, and Kai battle with James while Nathan watches. Saya's sword is unable to penetrate James' iron-like skin, leaving James an opportunity to kill Saya. However, Nathan stops him and makes him leave, promising Saya he would find her a "suitable" stage to die on. Weakened from the battle, Saya feeds on Hagi. Kai turns away, then looks back to find both have left.
37	"To the Sheer Level of Madness"; Transliteration: "Kuruoshii Made ni" (Japanese: 狂おしいまでに)	Yumi Kamakura	Shōtarō Suga	Kōji Komurakata	June 24, 2006	December 16, 2007
Gray and the others prepare for Javier's birthday party. While shopping with Monique, Kai spots Saya and Monique asks her to come to the party, which Saya agrees to do. Carl steals the Corpse Corps (without Amshel's permission) to go after Saya and Amshel sends Solomon after him. While Kai and Saya are talking, Carl arrives to battle her. Hagi, The Schiff, and the others deal with the Corpse Corps while Saya battles Carl. Carl grabs Saya from behind and bites into her, planning to drink all of her blood to kill both her and himself. Solomon arrives and cuts off Carl's arm, giving Saya the chance to stab him through her own body killing him. He orders the Corpse Corps back to their beds, and before disappearing, tells Saya that Diva is on her way to Christina Island.
38	"The Showdown Island"; Transliteration: "Kessen no Shima" (Japanese: 決戦の島)	Directed by : Ryo Miyata; Storyboarded by : Toshihiro Kikuchi	Shigeru Morita	Masaki Hinata	July 1, 2006	December 23, 2007
Unable to get a boat on her own, Saya reluctantly agrees to go to Christina Island on the boat with the Red Shield and The Schiff. When they arrive, the three remaining Schiff members go off on their own, despite Kai's warning to stick together, and engage numerous Corpse Corps. David, Lewis, Kai, Saya, and Hagi continue towards where they believe Diva is, but first must face off against James. While Saya continues to battle James, Kai takes Hagi to save The Schiff. With the help of Hagi and The Schiff, Saya is able to strike James with her sword. As he falls into a huge tunnel, he manages to pull Saya and Kai in, but Solomon appears and saves them both. He tells them that it was a trap set by Amshel to see if Solomon would tell Saya, and that Diva is on her way to New York. Before leaving, Solomon tells Saya that he is in love with her, and will always be on her side.
39	"The Magic Words, Once More"; Transliteration: "Mahō no Kotoba o Mōichido" (Japanese: 魔法の言葉をもう一度)	Tadahito Matsubayashi	Michiko Yokote	Kyoko Kotani	July 8, 2006	January 6, 2008
Lewis and Okamura confirm Solomon's story that Amshel is a chevalier. Saya agrees to go fishing with Gray, Kai, and the children. David and Joel drop in on a party being held by Amshel and Van Argiano to celebrate the American branch. While there, David talks with Julia, but is interrupted by Dr. Collins. Joel also talks with his "Uncle" Amshel, discussing the new business. Mao and Monique talk about their respective feelings for Kai, and his lack of feelings for them. To Van's shock, Amshel makes him the CEO of the Cinq Fléches' American operations due to Solomon's continuing absence. Also, Saya is sleeping longer and becoming harder to wake up. The next day, the group says their good-byes to Gray, Monique, and the children and heads to New York.
40	"Dreams That Chevaliers Dream"; Transliteration: "Shuvarie no Miru Yume" (Japanese: シュヴァリエの見る夢)	Shigeyasu Yamauchi	Shōtarō Suga	Kazuchika Kise	July 15, 2006	January 13, 2008
In New York, Saya rests in a hotel room and receives more blood transfusions while Hagi takes care of her. With her condition worsening, Saya grows more contemplative. She apologizes to Hagi for making him a chevalier, but Hagi assures her he has never regretted it. Solomon goes to where Diva and the others are, wearing a black suit instead of the white suits he used to prefer. Solomon asks Diva if she remembers the day they met. He tells her that he cannot see Saya as his enemy and proclaims his love for her. Diva tells him to do what he likes and strips him of his role as her chevalier. Amshel refuses to let him leave alive, but Nathan stops their fighting. Solomon says he will live with Saya as Solomon Goldsmith.
United States
41	"The Place Where I Belong"; Transliteration: "Watashi no Ibasho" (Japanese: 私の居場所)	Directed by : Masahiro Okamura; Storyboarded by : Hitomu Kumoi	Kurasumi Sunayama	Toshimitsu Kobayashi & Naoko Nakamoto	July 22, 2006	January 20, 2008
A month after the last episode, the apartment that Okamura and Mao were using in Los Angeles is blown up, so they join David and the others at their cheap apartment in Little Italy, New York. Saya is continuing to grow weaker and requiring more sleep. Mao makes her promise to return to Okinawa and go shopping with her after everything is over. Kai and Lewis meet with one of Lewis' old CIA contacts, and learns that Goldsmith has deep connections with both the U.S. military and the Secretary of Defense. While meeting with a retired general, Joel learns Diva will be performing at an Air Force base in North Carolina. Mao overhears Hagi and Saya talking about Saya's approaching time to go into her 30-year hibernation. Though she's furious, Mao agrees to keep her secret and makes a promise with her that no matter what, Saya will return to Okinawa. Meanwhile, Van puts Dr. Collins in charge of the research division at Cinq Flèches, while Amshel has Julia replace Dr. Collins as Diva's primary care physician. Julia learns that Diva is pregnant and that Amshel is one of Diva's chevaliers.
42	"Soprano of Miracles"; Transliteration: "Hibiku, Utagoe" (Japanese: 響く、歌声)	Directed by : Akiko Honda; Storyboarded by : Masayuki Miyaji	Shigeru Morita	Tōru Ōkubo & Akiko Nagashima	July 29, 2006	January 27, 2008
Saya and her group have infiltrated the Air Force base. Following Julia, David learns Diva appears to be eight weeks pregnant and that the babies will be born soon. Once Julia and Collins are alone, he attempts to kill her, but David intervenes and is shot. At the same time, David manages to stab Collins in the arm with a scalpel, after which Collins runs away and David passes out. Meanwhile, Amshel captures Kai and takes him to Diva, who wants to make him a chevalier. Saya is able to get Kai away, but when she goes after Diva, Amshel captures her, and Hagi is caught by Nathan. While they fight, several people attending the concert suddenly change into chiropterans and begin killing the other guests, only to be killed themselves by the Corpse Corps. Solomon appears and saves Saya from Amshel before flying off with her, after which Hagi frees himself from Nathan's grasp and leaves to rescue Saya.
43	"Confused Heart"; Transliteration: "Kokoro Midarete" (Japanese: こころ乱れて)	Directed by : Shintaro Itoga; Storyboarded by : Hiroshi Matsuzono	Reiko Yoshida	Kōji Komurakata & Kyoko Kotani	August 5, 2006	February 3, 2008
Saya wakes up, dressed in a ballgown, in Solomon's New York penthouse apartment, while Hagi searches for her. Solomon explains that he has left everything behind for Saya, including Diva. He pledges his eternal love and asks Saya to be his bride. He pledges to protect her and fulfill her every wish. As they talk, Solomon realizes Saya's time of sleep is coming, and swears he would kill Diva if Saya ordered him to. Hagi appears to retrieve Saya, saying she is his reason for being. Solomon won't let her go, and they begin a battle. As they fight, Saya gets dizzy and falls from the building. To save her, Hagi reveals his wings for the first time to viewers. When they land, Saya gently rejects his feelings, and tells him killing Diva is her job. She and Hagi fly off, returning to the apartment. Meanwhile, Julia goes with David to the hospital. As he is rushed to the emergency room, he asks her to come back to them. Julia keeps vigil over him as he lies unconscious in the hospital, and kisses him. Back at the apartment, Mao kisses Kai and confesses her love, but also accepts that his only thoughts are for Saya.
44	"Into the Light"; Transliteration: "Hikari no Naka ni" (Japanese: 光の中に)	Naoyasu Habu	Shōtarō Suga	Shinichi Miyamae	August 12, 2006	February 10, 2008
Julia, Kai, Lewis, and Saya discuss Diva's pregnancy and David's slow recovery. Lulu comes to visit Saya again. Julia tells them what she learned about the Schiff experiment and the Corpse Corps and that they could suppress the Thorn in The Schiff with Diva's blood. Kai takes Moses a shipment of blood, as part of their agreement that The Schiff won't attack humans if the Red Shield supplies them with blood. When Lulu returns home, Karman forbids her from seeing Saya and the others because they are too different from the humans. Moses enter and Karman yells at him, too. As they argue, Moses and Lulu discover that Karman has been inflicted with the Thorn. Karman runs out, unknowingly passing James. As the sun rises, Lulu asks Kai and Saya to help her find Karman. Karman goes to a hospital and attacks a nurse, but then sees a vision of Irène and the other Schiff members who've died. Realizing they are still alive in his heart, he leaves the woman alone. That night, James goes to see Moses, revealing that much of his body is now that of The Schiff and that he was rescued before Saya's blood could completely destroy him. He offers to help The Schiff try to cure the Thorn, just as Kai had. Moses finds Karman on the roof with his hood down so he can die in the rising sun, but Moses stops him and promises to save him.
45	"Turn the Palm of Your Hand Toward the Sun"; Transliteration: "Te no Hira o Taiyō ni" (Japanese: 手のひらを太陽に)	Directed by : Junichi Fujisaku; Storyboarded by : Tadahito Matsubayashi	Kurasumi Sunayama	Hiroyoshi Iida, Minako Shiba & Toshimitsu Kobayashi	August 19, 2006	February 17, 2008
Unable to find Karman, Kai and the others return to the apartment. Moses arrives and after apologizing to Kai, tells him he must die. Saya blocks his scythe swing, but Moses manages to knock Kai out of the window. Hagi catches him before he hits the ground. Kai runs, trying to stay in the light so Moses can't attack him. When Moses corners him in an alley, Kai tries to convince Moses to stop and find out why he's doing this, but Moses won't answer. Backed against a fence, the sunlight stops Moses and Kai escapes. He runs to Central Park, but Moses finds him again and begins chasing him around the forest. Meanwhile, James goes to The Schiff's hideout and tells Karman that Moses is going to kill Kai to save him, even though it won't really work. James tells Karman it is for his revenge, because the existence of The Schiff has separated him from the one he loves the most. After seeing his new half-Schiff body, Diva declared that James wasn't her James anymore and hates him. In the park, Kai manages to shoot off Moses hood, but then runs over to cover him back off so the light won't kill him. Spurning Kai's sympathy, Moses strikes at Kai with a spike he grows on his hand, but Karman appears and takes the blow meant for Kai instead. Karman calms Moses down and before they leave, asks Kai to give Lulu their weapons. They go to a bridge where Karman tells Moses they won't be forgotten since Kai will remember them and pass on those memories. Together they stand and face the setting sun, their hoods removed. As they are enveloped in green flames, they agree that they are glad they met. In the apartment, Lulu cries over their weapons.
46	"May Tomorrow Be a Clear Day"; Transliteration: "Ashita Tenki ni Naare" (Japanese: あした天気になあれ)	Directed by : Hirotoshi Rissen; Storyboarded by : Tokiichi Kagurazaka	Shigeru Morita	Emiko Abe & Makoto Matsui	August 26, 2006	February 24, 2008
Mao, watching Saya and Hagi talk and hold hands, asks Kai if Saya is her competition for his love. She sends him out shopping, then asks Saya to catch him because she has some embarrassing things on her list, then keeps Hagi from following by saying she needs his help around the house. At the subway station, Saya starts to faint, almost falling in front of the train but Kai catches her. Later, Saya promises Kai that she will always protect him and asks him to take better care of himself. Kai has a key of their father's bar made for Saya, so they can run it together. David leaves the hospital and returns to work. Saya and Hagi remember her making him promise to kill her, with his own hands, when everything is over. As he, Lewis, Julia, Joel, and Okamura discuss the situation, they realize the American government has Cinq Flèches deliberately creating chiropterans in America and abroad in order to create enemies that can only be defeated using the Corpse Corps. Julia explains to them that Diva's singing, when heard in person or a live process, it increases the effectiveness of the D-base (which causes people to turn to chiropterans) from 3% to 100%. Meanwhile, Nathan visits Solomon and takes him to see Diva and the babies, which Amshel "cut out of her stomach." Nathan tells him that now that the babies are born, he has no reason to fight his family anymore. To prove his commitment to Saya, Solomon attempts to kill Diva, but Diva easily defeats him and leaves him badly wounded. As Diva takes the babies inside, Nathan wonders if even a chevalier can survive such wounds.
47	"Beyond All Blood"; Transliteration: "Subete no Chi o Koete" (Japanese: 全ての血を超えて)	Directed by : Daisuke Takashima; Storyboarded by : Ryuuichirou	Reiko Yoshida	Tōru Ōkubo, Yoshiya Yamamoto & Hiroyoshi Iida	September 2, 2006	March 2, 2008
In order to keep Diva's public performance from being broadcast, David, Lewis, Kai, and Okamura go to Staten Island to blow up the satellite dishes. Though she is growing weaker and more tired, Saya is determined to fight so she doesn't wake up in a world full of chiropterans. Hagi asks Saya to reconsider their promise, but she makes him ask her to fight again. Amshel orders Nathan to kill Solomon, but Nathan releases him from the dungeon instead. James, in his full chiropteran form, goes to the apartment and attacks Saya. When Saya attacks him, though, her sword bounces off his skin. Hagi and Lulu try to help her in the fight, but the three are losing badly. As James moves to kill Saya with her own sword, Solomon arrives and, in his human form, blocks James' attack. Solomon then swears that he is Saya's chevalier by his own choice and states that it is "beyond blood". He is able to make James drop Saya's sword, but as it falls, it slices Solomon near his chest. James is suddenly inflicted with the Thorn, and Saya is able to deliver a lethal blow to his head. Solomon tells her to call his name if she ever needs him, then leaves. Though Hagi sees the cut from the sword, Saya does not appear to. Amshel finds Solomon in an alley trying to hold on, but he crystallizes in Amshel's arms from Saya's blood on her sword. Nathan and Amshel are now Diva's only surviving chevaliers.
48	"Skyscraper Opera"; Transliteration: "Matenrō Opera" (Japanese: 摩天楼オペラ)	Directed by : Shintaro Itoga; Storyboarded by : Hitomu Kumoi	Shōtarō Suga	Kyoko Kotani & Shinichi Miyamae	September 9, 2006	March 9, 2008
Saya, Hagi, and the Red Shield go to the Metropolitan Opera House to try to stop Diva's performance. Before the show starts, Nathan tells Amshel that the world exists to showcase Diva's beauty, as was predestined before she was born. When Amshel says Nathan talks like he was there, Nathan says he was and that before Diva was born, there was their "mommy" and her faithful chevalier. Kai confronts Hagi and demands to know what else they are hiding besides Saya's impending hibernation and begs him to take care of her. While they talk, Saya slips the key Kai gave her into his coat pocket and whispers goodbye. Saya and Hagi go to try to kill Diva before she can take the stage, but before she can charge Diva, Saya grows woozy again and can't attack. Hagi attacks Diva, but she easily dodges him, and then reveals herself to be not Diva, but Amshel in disguise. It was a decoy, and the real Diva is actually onstage beginning her performance. Hagi and Saya fight against Amshel. After he knocks Hagi out, Amshel tells Saya that if she had never set Diva free, Diva could have been his and his alone. He admits he has a constant obsession with Diva, which he views as the ultimate form of love for her. Diva begins singing, and people in the audience begin changing into chiropterans. Lewis is able to blow up the relay stations, but it doesn't work because they relay the signal through the military satellite feeds. Kai, David, Lewis, and Lulu go to the relay vans and destroy all of the equipment to stop the world-wide broadcast. They are soon surrounded by chiropterans and David is injured. Hagi attacks Amshel so Saya can go after Diva as Nathan watches from the audience with the babies beside him.
49	"Two Queens"; Transliteration: "Futari no Joō" (Japanese: 二人の女王)	Shigeyasu Yamauchi	Kurasumi Sunayama	Akiharu Ishii, Toyoaki Fukushima & Hiroyoshi Iida	September 16, 2006	March 16, 2008
Grant, the Secretary of Defense, escapes, and leaves Van behind to face the chiropterans alone. Saya tries to explain to Diva why she wants to kill her to protect the humans, but Diva reminds her that she was the only one who was ever treated as a human being. Diva returns to her regular form while she and Saya argue over the existence of chiropterans. Backstage, Amshel tries to upset Hagi by reminding him that his parents sold him to Amshel for a loaf of bread, but Hagi tells him he is grateful because it enabled him to meet Saya. Amshel and Hagi assume their true forms and begin fighting, going through the roof outside where Hagi is badly losing. Meanwhile, Lewis runs out of the transmitter trailer as a decoy to draw the chiropterans away with Lulu's help, while Kai gets David to safety. Hagi gains the upper hand over Amshel and impales him on the top of a skyscraper, but loses a wing in the battle. As Amshel tries to pull himself off, lightning strikes the rod, appearing to kill him by electrocution. Diva asks Saya if she is going to kill her babies as well, since she believes chiropterans shouldn't exist. Both load their swords with blood and begin their battle. Nathan, holding the babies, and Hagi watch from the audience, having agreed that, in the end, it is the queens' fight. Saya and Diva each impale the other with their blood-soaked swords, but Saya heals while Diva begins crystallizing. Saya cries and tries to help her, but Diva begins shattering. Nathan brings the babies to Diva, and she tells them good-bye and imagines herself holding them before she dies. Nathan says all she wanted was a family, something Amshel never understood, and explains that when she became pregnant, Diva's blood lost its potency. Nathan asks Saya to kill him, as he no longer has a purpose with Diva dead, and Saya does. Hagi comes up behind her and wraps his arms around her as she cries. Kai comes in and Saya tells him that she must die after she kills the babies.
50	"Nan-kuru-nai-sah"; Transliteration: "Nankurunaisa" (Japanese: ナンクルナイサ)	Jun Matsumoto	Junichi Fujisaku	Akiharu Ishii & Kōji Komurakata	September 23, 2006	March 23, 2008
With the song stopped and Diva dead, the chiropterans begin howling and the Corpse Corps stops fighting. Inside the opera house, Saya explains to Kai that she fears that if she and the babies live, they would be used as weapons of war. Kai promises to make anyone who won't accept them understand and to always protect and love them all. Hagi tells Saya that he has loved her from the moment they met and that for once, he is going to disobey her. Taking her sword, he begs her to live on and kisses her forehead. Saya cries and says she wants to live before kissing him. David bursts in and tells him to hurry and leave because Option D has been activated. Kai and Saya carry the babies as the group leaves, but Amshel, who survived his fight with Hagi, attacks the group, ripping off Hagi's arm with his breath attack. Saya swears to protect the babies, but when she tries to attack Amshel, Hagi grabs the sword from her and pushes her away before stabbing Amshel himself. As Amshel begins crystallizing, he stabs Hagi through the chest with his hand and the roof collapses on them both. Saya screams his name and the military planes begin bombing the opera house. A month later, Saya and the others are back in Okinawa. The number of chiropteran attacks continues to decrease and Julia, who is now pregnant with David's baby, has found a way to prolong Lulu's life. Nathan, who survived Saya's attempt to kill him, is seen at a press conference in America about the criminal investigations surrounding Van and Cinque Fleches' close involvement with the U.S. military. Saya and Kai are hosting a party at the reopened restaurant, inviting their friends from the Red Shield and their schoolmates. Okamura and Mao plan to go to the Middle East together. During the party, Saya slips outside and looks back at the restaurant with tears in her eyes before she collapses. Kai catches her and agrees to wait to tell the others. He carries her back to the Miyagusuku family crypt where she woke up. She whispers thank you as she drifts off to sleep. As he carries her up the steps toward the crypt, he promises to make them all happy and care for the babies until she wakes up. After the final credits, Kai is shown with Diva's children going to have a picnic at the Miyagusuku crypt. When they arrive, he sees a pink rose with a blue ribbon. Kai says "He's been here" and tells the twins to leave the rose alone as it is their aunt's and they begin their picnic.
