= List of Blood+ light novels =

The two Blood+ novels are written by different authors, utilize different illustrators, and are targeted towards different audiences. Their covers reflect these differences, as seen in comparing the covers of their first volumes.

Two Japanese light novel series were commission and created for the Blood+ anime series produced by Production I.G and Aniplex. The first, also named Blood+, written by Ryō Ikehata with illustrations by Chizu Hashii, is a four volume series and the official novel adaptation of the anime series. It expands on the events of the anime and gives greater background information on the battle against chiropterans. The first volume was released in Japan on May 1, 2006, by Kadokawa Shoten under their male-oriented Sneaker Bunko label. The remaining volumes released every four months until the final volume was released on May 1, 2007.

The second adaptation, Blood+: Russian Rose, is a two-volume series written by Karino Minazuki and illustrated by Ryō Takagi. It was released at the same time as Blood+, with the first volume released on May 1, 2006, and the second on September 1, 2006. The series, published under Kadokawa's more female-oriented Beans Bunko label, details Saya and Hagi's lives at the start of the 20th century and the Russian Revolution.

Both novel series have been licensed for release in English in North America by Dark Horse Comics. Dark Horse released the first translated Blood+ novel on March 19, 2008.

== Volume list ==
=== Blood+ ===
No.	Title	Original release date	English release date
1	First Kiss; Fāsuto Kisu (ファーストキス)	May 1, 2006; 978-4-04-425405-6	March 19, 2008; 978-1-59307-898-0
Book One: Okinawa (第一部・沖縄, Dai Ichibu Okinawa); Part Two (間章, Kai Shō); Book Two: Vietnam (第二部・ベトナム, Dai Nibu Betonamu); Part Two (終章, Shū Shō)
2	Chevalier; Shuvarie (シュヴァリエ)	September 1, 2006; 978-4-04-425406-3	July 9, 2008; 978-1-59307-931-4
Book Three: Russia (第三部・ロシア, Dai Sanbu Roshia); Part Two (間章, Kai Shō); Book Four: The Zoo (第四部・動物園, Dai Yonbu Dōbutsuen); Part Two (終章, Shū Shō)
3	Boy Meets Girl; Bōi Mītsu Gāru (ボーイ・ミーツ・ガール)	January 1, 2007; 978-4-04-425407-0	November 12, 2008; 978-1-59307-932-1
Book Five: Paris (第五部・パリ, Dai Gobu Pari); Book Six: London (第六部・ロンドン, Dai Rokubu Rondon); Part Two (終章, Shū Shō) (Note: The title "Part Two" in Volume 3 only appears in the original Japanese release. The English release does not include this division.)
4	Nankurunaisa; Nankurunaisa (ナンクルナイサ)	May 1, 2007; 978-4-04-425408-7	August 12, 2009; 978-1-59307-933-8
Book Seven: New York (第七部・ニューヨーク, Dai Nanabu Nyū Yōku); Epilogue: Okinawa (終章・沖縄, Shū Shō Okinawa); Afterword (あとがき, Atogaki); Commentary (解説, Kaisetsu)

=== Blood+: Russian Rose ===
No.	Original release date	Original ISBN	North America (Note: Blood+: Russian Rose is licensed for release by Dark Horse Comics and the first volume was originally solicited for release on March 18, 2009. However, Dark Horse Comics later removed the listings from their website and canceled the solicitation. It is unknown if the release has been canceled or simply delayed.) release date	North America (Note: Blood+: Russian Rose is licensed for release by Dark Horse Comics and the first volume was originally solicited for release on March 18, 2009. However, Dark Horse Comics later removed the listings from their website and canceled the solicitation. It is unknown if the release has been canceled or simply delayed.) ISBN
1	May 1, 2006	978-4-04-446405-9	—	—
Chapter 1 (第一章, Dai Ichibu Shō); Chapter 2 (第一章, Dai Nibu Shō); Chapter 3 (第一章, Dai Sanbu Shō); Chapter 4 (第一章, Dai Yonbu Shō); Chapter 5 (第一章, Dai Gobu Shō); Afterword (あとがき, Atogaki)
2	September 1, 2006	978-4-04-446406-6	—	—
Chapter 1 (第一章, Dai Ichibu Shō); Chapter 2 (第一章, Dai Nibu Shō); Chapter 3 (第一章, Dai Sanbu Shō); Chapter 4 (第一章, Dai Yonbu Shō); Chapter 5 (第一章, Dai Gobu Shō); Afterword (あとがき, Atogaki)
