= Engine (Jinn album) =

Studio album by Jinn
- Released: July 14, 2010
- Genre: J-pop, rock
- Length: 23:54
- Label: Defröck Records

Jinn chronology
Qualia (2008)	Engine (2010)

Engine (エンジン, Enjinn) is the second mini studio album by the rock band Jinn. It was released on July 14, 2010.

== Track listing ==
1. "Hyakumankai Sukida to Itte" (100万回好きだと言って) [3:52]
2. "Gamma" (ガンマ, Ganma) [3:18]
3. "Dokusō Ka" (独走歌) [3:50]
4. "Parallel World" (パラレルワールド, Parareru waarudo) [5:02]
5. "Dry Flower" (ドライフラワー, Dorai furawaa) [4:17]
6. "Optimist" [3:31]
