= Malachite (song) =

Single by Jinn

from the album Lemmings
- Released: November 22, 2006
- Recorded: 2006
- Genre: J-pop, Rock
- Label: Palm Beach
- Producer(s): Jinn

Jinn singles chronology
"Raion" (2006)	"Malachite" (2006)	"Kaidoku Funō" (2007)

"Malachite" (マラカイト, Marakaito) is Jinn's second single release. It was released on November 22, 2006, and reached number 84 on the Oricon charts in Japan.

== Track listing ==
1. "Malachite" (マラカイト, Marakaito)
2. "Moshimo" (もしも)
3. "Katatsumuri" (片瞑り)
