= Kotosabi no Ki =

Studio album by Jinn
- Released: Indies release: March 3, 2005; Major release: May 24, 2006
- Genre: J-pop; rock
- Label: Indies release 3xB RECORDS; Major release: Palm Beach

Jinn chronology
Kotosabi no Ki (2006)	Lemmings (2007)

Kotosabi no Ki (言錆の樹) is an indie album by Jinn and its debut major album. The album received its indie release on March 3, 2005, and later received its major album release on May 24, 2006.

== Track listing ==
1. Sō no Te (創の手)
2. Sukeeru (スケール)
3. Tsukikage (ツキカゲ)
4. Otenki Ame (お天気雨)
5. Etobira (エトビラ)
6. Niji Shū Sō (虹周走)

- Katatsumuri (片瞑り, Bonus track)
