= Lemmings (Jinn album) =

Studio album by Jinn
- Released: February 28, 2007
- Recorded: 2006
- Genres: J-pop, Rock
- Label: Palm Beach
- Producer: Jinn

Jinn chronology
Kotosabi no Ki (2006)	Lemmings (2007)	Qualia (2008)

Lemmings (レミングス, Remingusu) is Jinn's first major album. It was released on February 28, 2007. The album peaked at number 31 on the Oricon Albums Chart.

== Track listing ==
1. "Lemmings" (レミングス, Remingusu)
2. "Colors of the Four Seasons other side" (四季彩彩 other side, Shiki Sai Sai other side)
3. "26 other side"
4. "Tone Jiggy" (トーン・ジギ, Tōn Jigi)
5. "√135"
6. "Life" (みこと, Mikoto)
7. "Kaidoku Funō" (解読不能)
8. "Malachite" (マラカイト, Marakaito)
9. "May" (メイ, Mei)
10. "Raion" (雷音)
11. "Someday"
12. "Katatsumuri" (片瞑り)
13. "Hakuyūko" (薄夕湖)
