= List of Blood+ characters =

From left to right: Lewis, Julia, David, Hagi, Saya, Kai, Mao, and Okamura, as they appear in the second half of the series

The Blood+ anime, light novel, and manga series feature an extensive cast of characters designed by Chizu Hashii and co-created by Production I.G and Aniplex. The series is set within fictionalized versions of various real-life cities, including Okinawa, Japan; Hanoi, Vietnam; Yekaterinburg, Russia; Paris, France; London, England; Fayetteville, North Carolina; and New York City.

The main character of the series is Saya Otonashi, introduced as an ordinary teenage girl who is adopted into the family of Kai and Riku Miyagusuku years before the story of the series picks up. She cannot remember her past, and her life is dramatically changed when she learns that she is a chiropteran—a vampire-like creature—who was born in 1833. She survives by drinking the blood of others or receiving it through blood transfusions, and she is the only one who can destroy other chiropterans and her twin sister Diva. Saya and Diva are the "queens", descendants of a line of supremely powerful chiropterans that are always born as twin females. Aiding Saya in this century-long quest is an organization called the Red Shield, with a man named David assigned to be Saya's primary "handler." Saya, forced to return to her former life, is reunited with Hagi, her chevalier—a special form of chiropteran created by feeding a human the blood of a queen, which causes a powerful bond to form and compels the chevalier to serve and protect his queen at all costs.

As the series progresses, it is revealed that Diva has five cavaliers to aid her: Amshel Goldsmith, Solomon Goldsmith, Karl Fei-Ong, James Ironside, and Nathan Mahler. They have formed their own organization, Cinq Flèches, which they use to create additional chiropterans from Diva's blood. Working against both sides are the Schiff, a group of escaped artificial chiropterans created by Diva's group who attack both sides in search of the blood of Saya, Diva, or one of their chevaliers in hopes that one will be the right blood to save them from a fatal and painful disease they call the Thorn.

== Organizations ==
=== Red Shield ===
The Red Shield is an organization dedicated to eliminating Diva and chiropterans. The organization was started by the grandchildren of Joel Goldschmidt, who first found Saya and Diva in 1833 and raised them at the Zoo. He separated the sisters after birth, raising Saya like his own daughter while locking the unnamed up in a tower for scientific reasons. Joel took care of Saya, while his assistant Amshel provided for Diva's basic needs. Joel was killed by Diva in 1883 on his 72nd birthday after Saya released her from the tower to sing at his birthday party.

The leadership of the Red Shield is passed down from father to son, with the current leader being Joel Goldschmidt VI. Many of its members have endured tragic encounters with chiropterans in the field, and all members of the Red Shield carry an item containing a piece of red crystal taken from the crystallized body of a destroyed Chiroptera.

According to the Blood+ light novels, the organization's name is taken from the idea that the members are Saya's shield of blood, incapable of killing chiropterans themselves but willing to die to protect her.

=== Cinq Flèches ===
The Goldsmiths are a branch of the Goldschmidt family. Cinq Flèches, a pharmaceutical company owned by the Goldsmiths, is also active in other industries, operating hundreds of companies, including food production, the high-tech industry, and military contracts. The group has influential contacts within the United States government. This company is what causes humans to turn into chiropterans when hearing Diva's Song, most likely because they put Delta 6-7 in the food they distribute.

=== The Schiff ===
The three longest-living Schiff From left to right: Lulu, Moses, and Karman

The Schiff are soldiers created by a group of scientists led by Boris using Diva's blood, under the sponsorship of Amshel Goldsmith. Slaves at first, the ten Schiff decided they wanted to be free and escaped from the lab where they were created, killing most of the humans there. Trained only for fighting, they mostly know no other way of living or getting what they want except by force. However, they are deeply attached to each other.

Like chevaliers and chiroptera, the Schiff have enhanced speed and strength and must drink blood to survive. However, they are different in two key ways: sunlight will burn them to death, and they form a condition they call "Thorn" that causes them to slowly crystallize. It initially manifests itself as red cracks that usually appear on the neck, spreading along the body until the afflicted Schiff shatters completely.

Due to the parting words of one of the scientists from the lab, they believed that they were created from Saya's blood and that her blood would save them from their destined short lives. They attack Saya and Hagi, but when one of the Schiff, Ghee, drinks Hagi's blood, it kills him almost instantly. (Note: In the Region 1 English dub, Ghee is changed from male to female.) They later try again with Saya's blood, but it also causes the Schiff, Irène, who drinks it, to die instantly. They realize that the scientist lied and that it is Diva's blood they require to live, not Saya's, and devote themselves to hunting Diva down.

The Schiff do not appear in the manga at all.

== Protagonists ==
=== Saya Otonashi ===
Voiced by: Eri Kitamura (Japanese); Kari Wahlgren (English)

Saya Otonashi (音無 小夜, Otonashi Saya) is the main protagonist of the series, who was "born" in 1833 from one of two cocoon-like objects taken from the belly of a chiropteran mummy, the other cocoon containing her sister Diva. Both are kept by Joel Goldschmidt at the "Zoo", where Saya is treated as his daughter and Diva, who is left nameless, is confined to a tower. Saya does not learn about Diva's existence until 1863, when she hears Diva singing and finds her locked in a room at the top of the tower. Saya then names her Diva. In 1870, Amshel purchases a twelve-year-old boy named Hagi from his parents to become Saya's companion and friend, though she later falls in love with him and vice versa. During a birthday party for Joel in 1883, Saya releases Diva so that she can sing for Joel; Diva, however, slaughters everyone in the Goldschmidt house while Saya and Hagi are out looking for Joel's favorite flower. Realizing that Diva is a monster, Saya spends her periods of activity hunting Diva to try to kill her, her chevaliers, and any chiropterans they have created.

In a flashback dream, she is hunting Diva after the presumed death of her chevalier Grigori during the Russian Revolution. It turns out the girl, Sonia, is Grigori. Grigori is crystallized after Diva escapes with Amshel. After that, Saya goes into her deep sleep (30-year hibernation).

Saya is a skilled athlete and fights using a special katana with an edge she can touch with her thumb while gripping it so as to draw blood and grooves specially designed to spread her blood through its entire blade. Once loaded with her blood, it is a deadly weapon against Diva and any chiropteran created from Diva's blood. After Saya's first blade is broken, David gives her a new one that has a red crystal at the base of its blade, symbolizing her membership in the Red Shield organization. The crystal is a piece of her adoptive father's body, which crystallized when she killed him with her own blood in order to spare him the fate of turning into a chiropteran.

In 2005, when Blood+ begins, Saya is a high school girl living in Okinawa who was adopted a year ago by George Miyagusuku after waking from her hibernation cycle with no memory of her identity or past. Though she appears to be a normal teenager, any injuries she sustains heal almost instantly, and she must receive regular blood transfusions to remain healthy. When a chiropteran attacks her school, she finds her life turned upside down. She is reunited with her chevalier Haji, though she doesn't remember him, and learns that her blood can kill the chiropterans. She is approached by David, from the Red Shield, who tells her it is her duty to kill chiropterans because she is the only one who can. Neither David nor Haji will tell her the truth about her past, telling her she must remember on her own. Though at first Saya is reluctant to fight and afraid of who she might be, she slowly comes to accept her duty and regain her memories.

After Riku's death, Saya disappears for a year, along with Haji. When she returns, she has longer hair and a harder, darker appearance. Now accepting of her chiropteran biology, she accepts the necessity of feeding on Haji's blood to live and be strong enough to fight. However, she has a less cheerful personality and is more morose and less talkative than she used to be. Moses and Lulu both remark that she has lost hope. Believing the fight with Diva is hers alone and not wanting to have to grieve for any more lost comrades, she avoids cooperating with Kai or the Red Shield. Saya's friends repeatedly work to help her understand that this fight is not for her to bear by herself and that she is never alone. As the battle with Diva continues, Saya's next hibernation period draws nearer, she starts having sudden bouts of fainting spells, and her regeneration ability slows.

At the Metropolitan Opera House, Saya confronts Diva in a final duel, which ends as they simultaneously pierce each other with their blood-coated swords. Saya is unaffected by Diva's blood because it lost its potency when she became pregnant. Diva, however, begins to crystallize, and Saya cries for her and tries to hold her shattered pieces together. With Diva dead, Saya turns to killing the babies and herself, fearing that if they lived, they would be forced to become military weapons. Kai pleads with her to live, promising to protect her and the babies and make anyone afraid of her understand. Hagi disobeys Saya for the only time in his life, taking her sword and confessing he has loved her from the moment they met. Saya tearfully admits she wishes to live as she kisses Haji.

A month later, back in Okinawa, Saya finally goes into her next thirty-year hibernation period. At her request, Kai puts her back in the Miyagusuku family crypt to sleep, and he watches over her and Diva's children. Several years later, a pink rose with Haji's blue ribbon is left at the crypt. Hagi is alive, and he is watching from afar, waiting patiently for his love to awaken after her thirty-year sleep.

In the anime, Saya is the object of romantic interest for Kai, Hagi, and Solomon Goldsmith. Of the three, only Solomon shows his interest openly, effectively abandoning Diva and his brothers in order to spend his life with Saya. Although she appreciates his affections, Saya does not feel the same way and gently rejects his advances. Both Kai and Hagi spend most of the series suppressing their true feelings for Saya, stating that they only wish to protect and support her. Eventually, Kai suggests that when their war with Diva is finished, they both return to Okinawa to run their father's restaurant together, and he offers her a key to the restaurant. It is never explicitly stated whether Kai intended their relationship to become romantic, and he may only have meant that they could run the restaurant as siblings. In the series finale, Hagi admits that Saya is the one who taught him how to live and that she was the only person who ever made him happy. He regrets not being able to do the same by protecting her from the suffering caused by her conflict with Diva. He begs her to rethink her request for suicide and to live with him instead. The two kiss, and she admits that she wants to live with him and the others. Saya showed great distress when she thought he had died. After Saya enters her next 30-year hibernation period, Kai and the twins see a rose with a ribbon on it. Hinting that Hagi is alive and will wait for Saya until she awakes.

In the manga (which shows part of Saya's past from the 19th-century era), Saya doesn't care much for Hagi at first, telling him to find her one of every type of rose. When he cannot find the blue rose she requests, she tells him to leave. She visits Diva often, telling her about what goes on in her life. When she tells Diva about Haji, Diva convinces her that Haji is just the same as her other companions. Saya intends to drive Haji away again, until she finds that all the roses he has picked for her now have no thorns. After this, Haji and Saya grow closer, and she teaches him how to play the cello. As he grows older, Saya is shown to be flustered after merely touching his hand. At one point, Saya gets a cut and runs away when Haji sees it healing so quickly, believing he will think her a monster. She stays locked in her room for days, unwilling to come out even to take her 'medicine'. Unexpectedly, Haji crashes through her window with her medicine, tells her she is beautiful, and gives her the hair comb he has been waiting so long to give her. They share their first kiss. Their romantic relationship results in Saya no longer visiting Diva very often. When Saya lets Diva out of the tower, Diva pierces Haji's chest with her hand, leaving him to die for "being a nuisance". Upon discovering him, Saya gives him her blood and turns him into a chevalier.

=== Hagi/Haji ===
Voiced by: Katsuyuki Konishi (adult), Naomi Shindō (child) (Japanese); Crispin Freeman (adult), Jeannie Elias (child) (English)

Hagi (ハジ, Haji) is Saya's first and only living chevalier. In 1870, he was purchased by Joel and Amshel from his parents for a loaf of bread to be a companion for Saya, with hopes that they might mate and create more specimens for future experimentation. Hagi lives with her in Joel's mansion for many years, with him growing up but her never aging. In 1883, he falls from a cliff while attempting to pick a flower that Saya wants as a present for Joel's birthday. Misunderstanding an earlier conversation between Hagi and Joel about why Saya lives on blood and wanting to save him, she feeds him some of her blood, unwittingly turning him into a chevalier. Saya has felt some guilt over this through the years, but when she apologizes, Hagi assures her that he has no regrets, as it allows him to always be by her side while she lives her dream of traveling the world with her sword.

Hagi plays the cello, a skill he learned from Saya. He usually carries his cello in a large black case that he can also use as a blunt weapon and a shield, and the case also holds Saya's sword. Hagi also fights with a handful of silver daggers that he keeps on hand. As with most chevaliers, Hagi doesn't need to eat or sleep, and he stays awake while Saya eats, sleeps, or goes into long periods of hibernation. Unlike Diva's chevaliers, Hagi never makes a full transformation into a chiropteran form; however, this is by his own choice rather than a limitation of his power. He keeps his right hand bandaged most of the time to hide the fact that its form is permanently chiropteran since Saya injured it while going crazy from being forced awake decades ago in Vietnam. In the opening credits of the final season, Hagi is shown with wings, but he does not use them in the series until the forty-third episode.

After Diva's death, Hagi convinces Saya to live, confessing that he has always loved her. Agreeing that she does wish to live, Saya kisses him. As they, along with Kai and the rest of the Red Shield operatives, try to escape the opera house, Amshel attacks them, ripping off one of Hagi's arms. Saya reloads her sword with blood and is ready to fight him to protect Diva's babies. However, Hagi takes her sword and pushes her aside so she can escape while he impales Amshel himself. As Amshel crystallizes, he stabs Hagi through the chest, and the ceiling collapses on them both. He tells Saya that he'll always love her. Saya screams his name before they leave. She believes he may be dead, but Kai reassures her that Hagi will return. Years after Saya goes into her hibernation, Kai brings Diva's daughters to visit the Miyagusuku crypt, where Saya is sleeping. When they arrive, they find a fresh pink rose with Hagi's blue hair ribbon tied to it. Hagi is alive, and he is watching from afar, waiting patiently for his love to awaken after her thirty-year sleep.

In the manga, Diva convinces Saya that Hagi is like the rest of her companions and she should get rid of him. But when Saya sees that Hagi cut the thorns off the roses for her, she warms up to him. Unlike the anime, when Diva is set free, Hagi sees her and thinks it is Saya at first. Diva, jealous of Hagi being Saya's lover, kills him. Saya finds him, and Joel tells her that if she truly cannot live without him, then she should give him her blood. Although Hagi shows jealousy towards Kai in the anime, it is more obvious in the manga. He even pushes Kai into the helicopter, telling him that "Saya is my lover". His name can be spelled either Hagi or Haji.

=== Kai Miyagusuku ===
Voiced by: Hiroyuki Yoshino (Japanese); Benjamin Diskin (English)

Kai Miyagusuku (宮城 カイ, Miyagusuku Kai) is Saya's adopted "elder" brother. Once a popular student at school and a star athlete, he quit playing baseball shortly before Saya's arrival and has been getting into more fights at school. His father's death forces him to grow up and try his best to keep his family united. He struggles greatly over Saya, and later Riku, not being humans. As he finally comes to terms with both, Riku is raped and killed by Diva, and Saya disappears for a year. As the last surviving family member of Saya's adoptive family, he has sworn to protect her and return to Okinawa with her once everything has been settled. Towards the end of the series, he convinces Hagi to confess his feelings to Saya.

Initially, Kai has little skill in fighting or marksmanship, but he improves as the series goes on. When George is kidnapped, Kai steals his father's M1911 pistol to try to rescue him. David confiscates it but later returns it to show that he feels Kai is mature enough to handle it. Kai uses it as his primary weapon for the remainder of the series. After the destruction of the Red Shield, he lives with Lewis and David in an orphanage in London, actively hunting chiropterans with Lewis and honing his skills as a soldier in the war against Diva and her minions. With David drowning in alcohol and regret, Kai takes over many of David's responsibilities in chiropteran hunting. Following the tradition of Red Shield, Kai wears a diamond-shaped pendant with a crystal from Riku's remains crested in it.

After Saya kills Diva, he is able to convince her to continue living, which prompts Hagi to "disobey" Saya and confess his own love for her. Saya and Kai return to Okinawa and reopen their late father's restaurant. A month later, Saya goes into her hibernation cycle, and Kai puts her in the family crypt to sleep. As per his promise to Saya, he raises Diva's daughters as though they were his own. Together, they regularly visit Saya's resting place to keep an eye on her while she sleeps.

=== David ===
Voiced by: Jurouta Kosugi (Japanese); Christopher Nissley (English)

David was the sole survivor of a chiropteran attack on his special forces squad before joining the Red Shield. His father was also a member of Red Shield and was one of Saya's victims in the Vietnam incident. It is implied that he, along with Joel, are the only members that are descended from a line of Red Shield operatives. He is aware of Saya's past life and wishes to use her in the struggle against the chiroptera. David's red crystal item is a cross.

David tends to be straight-faced and serious, with a somewhat cold personality. However, he also assumes an unofficial guardianship of Kai and Riku and would be instrumental in helping Kai come to terms with what Saya is and with Riku's conversion to a chevalier. He seems to take a particular interest in helping Kai grow up to be a strong man who can support Saya and Riku as their brothers, despite their unusual natures.

David wields a Smith & Wesson Model 500 magnum revolver as his primary weapon. Carrying a handgun this powerful and large is unusual for an agent, but since chiropterans cannot be killed by normal means, Red Shield personnel must rely on the knockdown power of their guns to keep the monsters at bay.

When the Red Shield's headquarters are destroyed and Saya is believed to have gone down with it, David sinks into a deep depression and becomes an alcoholic. Hagi helps David snap his world back into focus, though, after Hagi makes an observation about David's unhappiness, and he picks up his gun and is able to fight once more. During the investigations into one of Cinq Flèches's labs, he finds Julia, and she tells him something about the research they are doing. He talks to her briefly again at Amshel's party, and he lets her know that she will always be welcome back with the group.

Towards the end of the series, Dr. Collins tries to murder Julia, but David jumps in front of her, getting critically wounded himself. Julia keeps vigil over him in the hospital, and after he recovers, they begin a romantic relationship. At the end of the series, Julia is pregnant with his child.

He mentions later in the series that he saw action in the Gulf War.

== Antagonists ==
Diva as she appears in the second half of the series accompanied by James Ironside, one of her chevaliers.

=== Diva ===
Voiced by: Akiko Yajima (Japanese); Kari Wahlgren (English)

Diva (ディーヴァ, Dīva) is Saya's younger twin sister and the main antagonist of the series. In 1833, Joel Goldschmidt discovered the mummy of an unknown creature that had two cocoons that reacted to human blood. Diva was born from one of these cocoons. As an experiment, Joel separated the twin girls, raising Saya as if she were his own daughter, while Diva, who was given no name at the time, was locked in a tower and given only the basic necessities to live by Joel's assistant, Amshel. In 1863, Saya discovers the girl locked in the tower and names her Diva. Twenty years later, Saya releases Diva from her tower so that she can sing at Joel's birthday party; however, Diva murders Joel along with the rest of the people attending the party before fleeing the area.

By 2005, when Blood+ begins, Diva has five living chevaliers, who head up the Cinq Flèches Group. Due to her upbringing, Diva has a ruthless nature wrapped in an often childlike demeanor. She giggles after killing people, shows little reaction to the deaths of her own knights, and tends to destroy things when bored. Diva seems to enjoy tormenting Saya and frequently says she wants to kill her.

After meeting Riku, Saya's adopted brother, she drinks most of his blood, and Saya is forced to turn him into a chevalier to save his life. After this incident, Diva becomes increasingly interested in Riku, eventually infiltrating the Red Shield headquarters with Karl to find him. She rapes Riku and kills him by giving him her blood, which crystallizes him. A year after this attack, when the Red Shield is able to regroup, Diva has changed her physical appearance to resemble Riku and retains that appearance until her final battle with Saya. Diva becomes an opera singer in New York, sponsored by the group. Cinq Flèches has spread the Delta 67 agent, which can turn people into chiropterans, across various populations of the world, including the United States. When heard live, Diva's voice greatly increases the agent's effectiveness of the agent.

As a result of her attack on Riku, Diva becomes pregnant. She does not give birth for over a year, when Amshel cuts the cocoons out of her body. Diva seems to treasure her babies and care for the cocoons. At the Metropolitan Opera House, Diva is set to perform a live broadcast that would cause much of the world's population to turn into chiropterans. The Red Shield and Saya are able to stop the broadcast, and the sisters have their final battle, while Diva's chevalier Nathan watches nearby with the babies. The fight ends as Diva and Saya pierce one another with their swords, which each had been coated with their own blood. Saya is unharmed by the attack, due to Diva's blood having lost its power when she became pregnant. Diva, on the other hand, begins to crystallize from the effects of Saya's blood. Her babies do not emerge from their cocoons before Diva reaches for them, with a vision of herself with her daughters.

In the manga, Diva does not take orders from any of her cavaliers except for Amshel, whom she believes truly loves her. Otherwise, she does as she pleases, so much so that she even takes on the identity of Grand Duchess Anastasia, the famous youngest daughter of Nicholas II. Although the manga never states how Diva became acquainted with the Romanov family, it is likely that Diva murdered the real Anastasia and learned the customs necessary to masquerade as a grand duchess from her chevalier Rasputin. She develops an attachment to the tsarevich Alexei, but soon becomes tired of her mortal brother and forces him to become her chevalier. Diva soon realizes how alike she and Alexei are in that neither of them were ever able to do the same things as their siblings and appears to have been saddened by his death at the hands of Saya. Also, her twins were never born because she was not interested in having a family. Another great difference is that she and Saya already knew about one another, and she became greatly jealous when Saya developed a relationship with Hagi. Not so ironically, after all their years as enemies, when Saya tries to commit suicide to die with her, Diva stops her. With a smile of peace, she tells her sister to live.

=== Amshel Goldsmith ===
Diva's living chevaliers, from left to right: Nathan, James, Amshel, Solomon, and Karl.

Voiced by: Joji Nakata (Japanese); Wally Wingert (English)

Amshel Goldsmith was the assistant of the original Joel Goldshmidt and the overarching antagonist. Amshel was responsible for bringing Diva food and taking care of her basic needs while she was locked in the tower. In 1883, after Diva's release from the tower, Diva spares Amshel during her murder spree and turns him into a chevalier. Amshel refers to her as his "little treasure", later revealing that he was completely obsessed with Diva, which he feels is the "ultimate form" of love for her. He once tells Saya that he wishes she hadn't freed Diva because then Diva would still be his and his alone.

Amshel is generally seen as the leader of Diva's chevaliers and is the head of the Cinq Flèches. Despite referring to his fellow cavaliers as his brothers, he seems unaffected when Karl dies, grows increasingly disgusted with Solomon's love for Saya, and orders his execution. He also ordered the death of Diva's third cavalier, Martin Bormann, who is only seen in photograph form in the series. After Saya's awakening, Amshel initially tried to bring her to their side. In Russia, he killed the Red Shield agent Liza and took her place during a train ride to Ekaterinburg. He reveals to Saya her true nature as a chiropteran and that she is killing her own kind with her sword. When Saya remains determined to fight and kill Diva, he decides she must be exterminated.

After a fight with Hagi over New York City, Amshel was impaled on the Chrysler Building and struck by lightning. He was presumed dead but reappeared in a half-human, half-chiropteran form and tried to attack Saya again. Hagi stabs him with Saya's blood-covered sword, crystallizing him, moments before the opera house collapses on top of them both.

In the manga, Amshel has more control over Diva and is the only one she'll really listen to.

=== Solomon Goldsmith ===
Voiced by: Koji Tsujitani (Japanese); Dave Wittenberg (English)

Solomon Goldsmith was a medical doctor who was introduced to Diva by Amshel in 1917 during World War I. At this time, he became one of her chevaliers, after which he wears only white clothing as a symbol of his being Diva's chevalier because that's what he was wearing when he met her. At the time, he wanted to free himself from seeing humans kill each other, but afterwards, he started seeing humans as insignificant and beneath him. As time passed, he realized the world of the chiropterans was just as full of war as the human one.

Although he agrees that Saya is now a threat to him and his partners, he harbors strong feelings for her and regularly tries to protect her, despite his brothers' intentions to destroy her. He was first introduced to her as a delightful young man at the ball in her Vietnamese school and danced his only dance with her. After the dance, he apologized, telling her that he had only asked her because she was the only girl who wasn't staring at him. He did not discover who she was until later. He later saves Saya from James and says he wishes to protect her because he is in love with her. Solomon's love for Saya only continued to grow as the series progressed, bringing him into conflict with his chevalier brothers and with Diva. Solomon eventually decides that he simply cannot kill Saya or continue to support Diva's efforts to do so and instead wants to live with her as someone who loves her. While Amshel thinks Solomon's love for Saya is just part of his instinct as a chevalier, Solomon disagrees and knows he loves Saya as himself. Diva disowns him and tells him to do whatever he wants. As a sign of his no longer being Diva's chevalier, Solomon stops wearing his signature white suits, instead switching to black ones. Solomon kidnaps Saya after saving her from Amshel. He confesses his love for her and asks her to marry him, but Saya gently rejects him. Afterwards, Solomon briefly sinks into a depressed mood. Nathan visits him and takes him to visit Diva and the babies, but Solomon uses the opportunity to try to kill her. Diva easily defeats him, and he is imprisoned at the mansion. James taunts him by promising to kill Saya and bring her head in front of him. Amshel tells Nathan to kill him, but Nathan frees him instead. Solomon rushes to save Saya from James, but during the battle he is accidentally cut by Saya's sword, which is coated in her blood. He proclaims his allegiance to Saya as her chevalier once more, then leaves. In an alley, he begins to crystallize and shatter as Amshel watches.

In the manga adaptation, Solomon wants to find out whether a chiropteran can reproduce or not and tries to make Diva mate with Riku after the boy was made into Saya's chevalier. Solomon doesn't take kindly to her childish behavior when she throws a temper tantrum, scratches his face, and renounces his status as her chevalier. After reuniting Riku with Saya and Kai, Solomon attempts to take Saya as his "bride," but she doesn't trust him and tells him to prove himself by helping her kill Diva. Solomon, who survives at the end of the manga with Van's assistance, is shown observing Saya and the others from a van and vows to try to mate with her after she wakes up from her 30-year hibernation.

=== Karl Fei-Ong ===
Voiced by: Nozomu Sasaki (Japanese); Quinton Flynn (English)

Karl Fei-Ong (Note: In the English Dub, his name is spelled Carl.) was introduced to Diva in 1917 by Amshel. When he met her, he requested that she turn him into a chevalier. Amshel later says he only chose Karl to use him as a guinea pig for their new Delta project. Karl's body was heavily modified by Amshel's experiments, including having the arm Saya destroyed in Vietnam in 1972 and replaced with a spiked arm. His traumatic past, Diva's inability to give him the love he sought, and his forced conversion seem to have left Karl severely mentally unbalanced. However, Solomon, the only one who could calm Karl's mania, believed Karl's problems stemmed from his being lonely and not seeing that Solomon was always there and watching over him.

Disguised as his alter ego "The Phantom", Karl kidnapped girls that looked like Saya in his desire to see her again to finish their fight. After finding her again, Karl became completely obsessed with killing her. He considered Saya his hated enemy, his beloved soul mate, and his only reason for living.

While in London, he stole the Corpse Corps from Amshel and went after Saya while she was at Gray's home. He planned to die with her by drinking all of her blood. Solomon, who'd come after him at Amshel's request, cuts off Karl's arm, freeing Saya's sword arm. Realizing she has too much to live for, Saya stabs him by impaling her own body. With her sword coated in her blood, Karl crystallizes and is destroyed. Solomon mourns his death and tries to explain Karl's actions.

In the manga, Karl's appearance and mannerisms are completely changed. He is the only one besides Amshel that Diva cares for and is said to be her "favorite" chevalier. After Saya cuts off his arm in Vietnam, he is not allowed to see Diva again and is stripped of his status as a chevalier, even getting his name changed to Charles. He forms a sort of friendship with Van, who uses him for various experiments, including producing the Corpse Corps, and with Riku, who bonded with Charles while held in captivity. Riku shields Charles from getting shot by Van; when Saya comes across them, she slays Charles (believing him to be responsible for killing Riku) and turns Riku into her chevalier. Riku later encounters one of Charles' clones and mistakes it for his deceased friend. Though his clone is feral and apparently unable to talk normally, he bonds with Riku as well, and the two have a strange but loyal friendship.

=== James Ironside ===
Voiced by: Toru Okawa (Japanese); David Rasner (English)

James Ironside became one of Diva's chevaliers in 1945 in Berlin, Germany, during World War II. He is the Cinq Flèches' contact with the US military and later was appointed by Amshel as leader of the Corpse Corps and to take on the task of killing Saya. He is extremely devoted to caring for and protecting Diva. He considers her his beloved "Mama" and always carries her picture with him in a locket. When he lured Saya's group to Christina Island to eliminate Saya, he was struck by Saya's sword and fell into the trap he'd set to bury her in. He was saved when Nathan retrieved him, and Amshel had most of his body replaced with Schiff parts.

Once Diva realizes that most of his body has been replaced with Schiff parts, she disapproves of it and begins to avoid him. Towards the end of the series, James begins to lose his sanity due to his crumbling relationship with Diva, and he takes out his rage on the Schiff, whom he regards as inferior organisms to himself. In his final battle against Saya, James begins to succumb to the thorn before being killed by Saya.

In the manga adaptation, James is killed by Saya during the attack on Red Shield headquarters.

=== Nathan Mahler ===
Voiced by: Keiji Fujiwara (Japanese); Wally Wingert (English)

In the original Japanese series, Nathan often speaks in a manner usually employed by the feminine gender, such as using kashira and wa. In the Sony English dub, this is represented by Nathan speaking in the manner of a stereotypical homosexual character. Unlike the other chevaliers, Nathan rarely participates in battle. In the opening credits of the final season, Nathan is shown fighting with Saya, though they never do in any episode. Behind his seemingly effeminate and lackadaisical manners, Nathan may be the most powerful of the chevaliers and will assert his dominance over his younger "brothers" if he feels he needs to. He is the only one of Diva's chevaliers who can make Amshel and James back down if he chooses to, and the only one Amshel rarely attempts to manipulate. He says he wishes to destroy Saya on a "stage" prepared for the occasion, which prompts him to stop some battles between Saya and his brothers in order to save her for the death he has planned for her. Nathan is more empathetic to Diva's true intentions than Amshel, telling Saya after Diva's death that the only thing Diva actually wanted was to have a family.

Towards the end of the series, while talking with Amshel, Nathan states that the world exists to showcase Diva's beauty, as was predestined before she was born. When Amshel says Nathan acts like he was there, Nathan claims that he was and cryptically tells Amshel that before Diva and Saya were born, their mother had a "faithful chevalier" just as her daughter has now. After Diva's death, Nathan asks that Saya kill him, changing into his chiropteran form and allowing Saya to cut him in half with her blood-loaded sword, after which he falls through an opening in the stage to his presumed death. In the last episode, however, Nathan makes a reappearance in human form among some reporters outside of Van's trial.

In the light novels, the original Nathan Mahler was killed by a surviving chevalier of Saya and Diva's mother. This chevalier transformed into Nathan, thus assuming his place as one of Diva's cavaliers.

In the manga, Nathan is made a chevalier because Amshel ordered Diva to turn him. During the attack on Red Shield headquarters, he is shocked by James' death and Diva's lack of grief over it, prompting her to reveal that she doesn't care about James or Nathan himself. She later badly injures Nathan in the midst of a mental breakdown. These incidents haunt Nathan, eventually causing him to snap and murder Diva. He is in turn killed by an enraged Saya, who had been on the verge of reconciling with her sister.

== Supporting characters ==
=== George Miyagusuku ===
Voiced by: Hōchū Ōtsuka (Japanese); Wally Wingert (English)

George Miyagusuku (宮城ジョージ, Miyagusuku Jōji), an Okinawan-American US Army veteran who served in the Vietnam War, is one of the soldiers present when Saya goes insane in Vietnam, killing friends and enemies alike. One of the few survivors, he is asked by the first David to watch over Saya's sleeping body after she falls into another hibernation cycle. He lost his wife and biological children in an accident years before, but is inspired to live by the sound of Saya's heart beating in her cocoon. When she wakes up from her sleep and he sees she is no longer a threat, he adopts her as his daughter. At this time, he also has two adopted sons, Kai and Riku.

While protecting Saya, he is attacked by a chiropteran. While recovering from his wounds, he is kidnapped from the hospital and taken to a US military base, where he is infused with Delta 67. After escaping, he is again wounded by a chiropteran while protecting Saya. The Delta 67 and the wounds from the chiropteran begin to change him into a chiropteran, so he asks Saya to pour her blood into his wounds and kill him. Saya is very reluctant, though, because he is the only father she has ever known. While they talk, he holds her hands, causing her blood to slowly run down his arms, drip into his wounds, and kill him.

In the manga adaptation, George survives and is not turned into a chiropteran. He remains in Okinawa, patiently waiting for his children to come home, and welcomes them back at the end of the manga.

=== Riku Miyagusuku ===
Voiced by: Akiko Yajima (Japanese); Kamali Minter (English)

Riku Miyagusuku (宮城 リク, Miyagusuku Riku) is the adopted brother of Kai and Saya, the youngest of George Miyagusuku's three adopted children. He is a very kind and intelligent boy who loves to cook. His kind, gentle nature even rubs off on the reclusive Hagi to some degree, particularly after he brings Hagi a plate of food and asks him to join the others. Hagi teaches Riku how to play the cello and protects him from a bad injury after Riku falls from a moving train.

After Diva drinks most of his blood at the "Zoo", Saya is forced to turn Riku into a chevalier to save his life. Afterwards, Riku shows a compulsion similar to Hagi's to protect Saya at any cost. Despite a brief estrangement, Riku remains close to his older brother Kai and works to heal the broken relationship between Kai and Saya after Kai learns the truth about her. Draining Riku's blood seems to cause Diva to develop a strong interest in him. She takes Karl to the Red Shield headquarters to find Riku. Once she finds him, she rapes him and then kills him with her blood. In the light novel adaptation, it's explained that something in Diva's eyes causes the Chevalier blood in Riku to react with a "maddening desire" that causes him to be incapable of escaping or physically resisting Diva's actions. After Riku's death, Kai has a piece of his crystallized body made into a pendant, which he wears around his neck to remember his lost brother.

In the manga adaptation, Riku befriends Charles (Karl) during his captivity. He is made Saya's chevalier when he intervenes in Van's attempt to kill Charles. On Solomon's orders, Diva attempts to mate with Riku but stops when he confuses her with Saya and she becomes upset. Riku becomes determined to save Diva from Saya because he wants chiroptera (himself included) to peacefully co-exist with humans. Initially oblivious to Charles' death, Riku meets a clone of Charles, whom he takes care of.

=== Mao Jahana ===
Voiced by: Ami Koshimizu (Japanese); Olivia Hack (English)

Mao Jahana (謝花 真央, Jahana Mao), the daughter of the head of the Jahana Yakuza, is often bossy and likes to be in control, a trait she probably picked up from her father. Her blunt, confrontational demeanor seems to be a brave facade she puts up whenever things don't go her way or she's scared.

A strong-willed and stubborn schoolmate of Kai's, after Mao meets Okamura and realizes he knows something about Kai's disappearance, she forces him to take her along by financing the trip with money she steals from her father, implying he would try to kill Okamura for the theft. She is determined to stick by Kai's side, despite his best efforts to shield her from the danger surrounding him and Saya. As the series progresses and she comes to terms with Kai not returning her feelings, Mao warms up to Saya. The only girl "in a group of men," she grows more protective and concerned about Saya's well-being as Saya's health seems to decline. When she accidentally overhears Saya and Hagi's conversation about Saya's impending thirty-year hibernation cycle, Mao becomes furious and slaps her. She agrees to keep it a secret from the others, then tells Saya she will make a promise with her—a promise between two women—to personally bring Saya back to Okinawa once everything is over.

Mao finally decides to test Kai's feelings once and for all and kisses him, but he doesn't respond and seems baffled by her actions. Realizing her love will never be returned, she gives up and tries playing matchmaker between Kai and Saya. She later accompanied Okamura to the Middle East.

In the manga, Mao appears only at the beginning. She plans to put Saya in her play just to get Kai to come see it. After briefly bonding with Saya, Mao is horrified when she witnesses Saya recover from a mortal injury by drinking her blood when the play is attacked by chiropterans.

=== Julia Silverstein ===
Voiced by: Yuko Kaida (Japanese); Abby Craden (English)

Julia Silverstein is a medical doctor working for the Red Shield. She is first seen in the series acting as Saya's doctor and supervising Saya's blood transfusions. She is committed to researching the true nature of chiropterans to help destroy them. Her supervisor and mentor, Dr. Collins, defects to Cinq Flèches, wanting to be able to publish his research and because he disagrees with the idea of killing chiropterans. He is able to convince Julia to join him and betray the Red Shield. She meets with David several times while he is investigating the Cinq Flèches and the Corpse Corps, and he always reminds her that she will be welcome back to the Red Shield when she is ready. When Diva becomes pregnant after raping Riku, Julia becomes her personal physician. This sends Collins into a jealous fit, and he attempts to murder her, but David saves her and is shot instead.

Afterwards, Julia keeps vigil over the critically wounded David in the hospital and is shown kissing him while he sleeps. She also returns to the Red Shield and is able to use the knowledge she gained to aid them in the final battle with Diva. After Diva is killed and the group returns to Okinawa, Julia is able to use the knowledge she gained to extend the Schiff Lulu's life span and develop a serum from Saya's blood that can stop the effects of the Delta 67 agent. She is also revealed to be pregnant with David's child.

=== Lewis ===
Voiced by: Takashi Nagasako (Japanese); David Rasner (English)

Lewis is an oversized brown-skinned man who is responsible for providing gadgets and transportation for the Red Shield operatives. He also provides intel from the CIA during American operations thanks to the connections formed when he was a CIA agent, working under the name Sammy. He regularly accompanies David during operations, and after Kai becomes a member of Red Shield, they frequently work together as well. In the English dub of the series, Lewis is given a Jamaican accent despite being a native Okinawan in the original Japanese track.

=== Van Argiano ===
Voiced by: Junichi Suwabe (Japanese); Crispin Freeman (English)

Van Argiano is a Frenchman and the head scientist studying chiropterans for Cinq Flèches. He was in charge of the development of Delta 67, working under Solomon and with his assistant, Archer. After Solomon defected from the group, Amshel appointed him head of the Cinq Flèches American branch. Despite knowing their true nature and plans, Van sided with the chiropterans and aided them in their efforts to spread chiropterans around the world. Van is often shown to be eating some kind of hard candy, sometimes offering some to colleagues.

However, he was betrayed at the Metropolitan Opera House and was not told of the plans to turn people there into chiropterans. He was left to face the monsters on his own by his American contact, Secretary of Defense Grant, but is saved by David. At the end of the series, he is shown being taken to trial to face charges for his crimes. His assistant, Archer, is also revealed to be a government-appointed investigator who had infiltrated Cinq Flèches to gather her evidence.

In the manga, he acts as Charles's assistant, almost as a caretaker, frequently providing the chevalier with his trademark candy. Van is aloof, stoic, and cold, viewing Charles only as a guinea pig and even trying to kill him when he has outlived his usefulness. While Van never pays for his crimes, he does save Solomon and is seen in the end with him.

=== Akihiro Okamura ===
Voiced by: Kentaro Ito (Japanese); David Rasner (English)

Akihiro Okamura (岡村 昭宏, Okamura Akihiro), a somewhat jaded, down-on-his-luck, chain-smoking newspaper reporter, Okamura is the son of the photographer and Vietnam Warcorrespondent who had taken several mysterious black-and-white photos depicting a young girl killing soldiers, villagers, and grotesque monsters with a sword. After seeing them as a child, the photographs have always haunted Okamura, spurring him to discover the truth behind them. After tracing wine dumped by the military to Vietnam, Okamura sees Saya fighting Karl and manages to take some pictures of her. He is caught by David, but later released.

Back in Okinawa, his research comes to a standstill as his paper refuses to fund a trip to France to continue tracing the origins of the wine. He runs into Mao, who has been searching for Kai. When she realizes Okamura can help her find him, she forces him to pair up with her by stealing money from her Yakuza father and leaving a note saying she is running away with Okamura. As the pair continue exploring the truth, Okamura realizes that it is larger and more disturbing than he ever imagined.

Okamura and Mao catch up with Saya and the others in Paris and are taken to the Red Shield headquarters. At first considered pests, David eventually taps Okamura's investigative abilities and requests their aid in looking into Diva's New York concert. After this, Okamura and Mao become unofficial members of Saya's group, first researching in Los Angeles and then joining them in New York after their apartment is blown up by Cinq Flèches.

Okamura tends to be relatively cynical, and though he often expresses annoyance at her tempestuous nature, he never seems to get tired of having Mao with him. Despite their regular bickering, they work well together. When he is asked to go with the others to Staten Island, Okamura leaves his favorite camera with Mao, asking her to look after it; when she asks why, he refuses to explain. At the end of the series, Okamura decides to go to the Middle East, and Mao joins him.

He is not shown in the manga at all.

=== Joel Goldschmidt VI ===
Voiced by: Akira Ishida (Japanese); Crispin Freeman (English)

Joel Goldschmidt VI is the current head of the Red Shield and a descendant of the original Joel, who found Saya and Diva. Every man in his family who bears the name Joel must live and fight against the chiroptera throughout their lives until they are no longer a threat. His "diary" contains a record of all of the Red Shield's activities since its formation as well as all known information on Saya, Diva, the chevaliers, and the chiroptera. Joel became the head of the Red Shield in 2002. He primarily works in the background, trusting his operatives to handle the day-to-day work while he provides support. When Diva and Karl attack the Red Shield headquarters, Joel is badly wounded and left paralyzed from the waist down. After David recovers emotionally from the destruction of the headquarters, Joel reforms the Red Shield to continue to support Saya and stop Diva.

=== Aston Collins ===
Voiced by: Hideyuki Umezu (Japanese); Steven Blum (English)

Dr. Aston Collins was once the second-in-command of the Red Shield, primarily in charge of researching the chiroptera with Julia as his assistant. He grew increasingly frustrated at being unable to ever publish his research. Van Argiano approaches him about joining Cinq Flèches, and Collins agrees. He betrays the Red Shield by revealing the location of the organization's headquarters. Collins convinces Julia to join him, but turns against her after Amshel makes her Diva's personal physician. Sent into a jealous rage, he confronts Julia and attempts to murder her so he can regain his position. Right as he is about to shoot her, David runs in and acts as a human shield to protect Julia. Despite being shot, David is able to throw a scalpel into Collins' arm, which causes him to run away screaming. Collins is never seen again in the series, and his current location is unknown.

=== Moses ===
Voiced by: Naoki Yanagi (Japanese); Steven Blum (English)

Moses (モーゼス, Mozesu) is the Schiff's leader. He was the one who had encouraged Schiff to leave the lab for the sake of hope. Clones of Moses are used to make up the Corpse Corps. He committed suicide along with Karman, who was about to die from Thorn, by both removing their hoods in direct sunlight.

=== Karman ===
Voiced by: Kenji Nojima (Japanese); Dave Wittenberg (English)

Karman (カルマン, Karuman) is a tall, slender boy with a tendency to be aggressive, particularly towards humans. He can be hot-headed and impulsive but seems to genuinely care for his fellow Schiff. Karman is inflicted with the thorn, and he commits suicide with Moses.

=== Lulu ===
Voiced by: Chiwa Saito (Japanese); Lara Jill Miller (English)

Lulu (ルルゥ, Ruruu) is a diminutive young girl with sunken eyes who befriends Saya's group after the death of Irène, despite the objections of Karman and Moses. Lulu has a somewhat innocent and childlike personality and comes to enjoy some of the human elements of life, such as watching television. After Karman and Moses kill themselves, Lulu becomes the last living Schiff and starts to live with Saya and the others. She continues to aid the Red Shield in the battle with Diva as best she can. After Diva is killed, Julia is able to use the knowledge she gained while working with the Cinq Flèches to extend Lulu's life and ward off the Thorn.

=== Irène ===
Voiced by: Megumi Toyoguchi (Japanese); Olivia Hack (English)

Irène (イレーヌ, Irēnu) is one of the Schiff, but unlike her companions, she is greatly bothered by the idea of killing humans to drink their blood, refusing to do so despite its leaving her in a weakened state. She fights with a wide, double-sided sword. After Kai saves her from some thugs in Paris, Irène tells him how the Schiff came to exist, how they are dying from Thorn, and why they keep attacking Saya. She also tells him that they think Saya's blood will save them, so he offers to ask her. When the Schiff later attack Saya's group, she and Kai try to convince both sides to stop fighting because of their new friendship, but the fighting only stops when Irène collapses from her progressing thorn. Saya reluctantly agrees to feed her some of her blood, but it ends up killing Irène. Her death is mourned by Kai, Saya, and the Schiff alike. Realizing it's Diva's blood they really need, Irène's death is the precipice for the end of the hostilities between Saya's group and the Schiff.

=== Forrest ===
Voiced by: You Kitazawa (Japanese); Crispin Freeman (English)

Forrest (フォレスト, Foresuto) is a regular customer at George Miyugyasiku's bar. He ends up being attacked by a Chiropod and becoming infected. He goes to George to get help for his infection, but he soon loses control and critically injures George. Realizing what he has done, Forrest runs away. He tries to call his girlfriend, but he succumbs to his infection and kills her. He is killed by Saya afterwards.

=== Kaori Kinjo ===
Voiced by: Mai Kadowaki (Japanese); Amber Hood (English)

Kaori Kinjo (金城 香里, Kinjō Kaori), a high school girl and Saya's best friend in Okinawa, who cheers him up when he is sad.

== Other characters ==
=== Hibiki and Kanade ===
Voiced by: Akiko Yajima (Hibiki), Eri Kitamura (Kanade) (Japanese); Laura Jill Miller (Hibiki), Amber Hood (Kanade) (English)

Hibiki Otonashi (音無 響, Otonashi Hibiki) and Kanade Otonashi (音無 奏, Otonashi Kanade) (Note: The twin's names are revealed in Blood# novel.) are twin daughters of Diva and Riku, whom were later raised by Kai. At the age of four, they were seen with Uncle Kai visiting Saya during her hibernation. Years later, at the age of sixteen, Hibiki and Kanade felt like they were different from everyone and were told to never touch each other's blood. Hibiki follows Aunt Saya's example by turning David Jr. into a chevalier, and Kanade's blood gets stolen by Adam, who ingests it to become a chevalier.
