= Blood+ =

2005 Japanese anime series

- First DVD volume of Blood+ as released by Aniplex, featuring Saya Otonashi and Haji
- Type: TV series
- Genre: Horror fantasy; Suspense; Vampire
- Created by: Production I.G; Aniplex
- Directed by: Junichi Fujisaku
- Series composition: Junichi Fujisaku
- Character designers: Chizu Hashii (original); Akiharu Ishii
- Music by: Mark Mancina
- No. of episodes: 50 (list of episodes)

Production
- Art director: Junichi Higashi
- Sound director: Yoshikazu Iwanami
- Cinematographer: Hiroshi Tanaka
- Color designer: Yumiko Katayama
- CG director: Makoto Endō
- Editor: Taeko Hamauzu
- Studios: Production I.G
- Executive producers: Hideo Katsumata; Mitsuhisa Ishikawa
- Producers: Hirofumi Moritomi; Hiroo Maruyama; Tomonori Ochikoshi; Katsuji Morishita
- Production companies: Production I.G; Aniplex; MBS

Original release
- Networks: JNN (MBS, TBS)
- Release: October 8, 2005 – September 23, 2006

Related
- Manga
- Written by: Asuka Katsura
- Published by: Kadokawa Shoten
- English publisher: AUS: Madman Entertainment; NA: Dark Horse Comics
- Magazine: Monthly Shōnen Ace
- Original run: December 26, 2005 – April 26, 2007
- Volumes: 5
- Manga

Blood+ Adagio
- Written by: Kumiko Suekane
- Published by: Kadokawa Shoten
- English publisher: AUS: Madman Entertainment; NA: Dark Horse Comics
- Magazine: Beans Ace Magazine
- Original run: April 26, 2006 – December 26, 2006
- Volumes: 2
- Manga

Blood+ Kowloon Nights
- Written by: Hirotaka Kisaragi
- Published by: Kadokawa Shoten
- English publisher: NA: Dark Horse Comics
- Magazine: Ciel
- Published: April 26, 2006
- Volumes: 1
- Light novel
- Written by: Ryo Ikehata
- Illustrated by: Chizu Hashii
- Published by: Kadokawa Shoten
- English publisher: NA: Dark Horse Comics
- Imprint: Kadokawa Sneaker Bunko
- Original run: May 1, 2006 – May 1, 2007
- Volumes: 4
- Light novel

Blood+ Russian Rose
- Written by: Chougatsu Karino
- Illustrated by: Takagi Ryou
- Published by: Kadokawa Shoten
- English publisher: NA: Dark Horse Comics
- Imprint: Kadokawa Beans Bunko
- Original run: May 1, 2006 – September 1, 2006
- Volumes: 2
- Video game

Blood+: Sōyoku no Battle Rondo
- Publisher: Sony Computer Entertainment
- Genre: Adventure game
- Platform: PlayStation 2
- Released: July 27, 2006
- Video game

Blood+: One Night Kiss
- Developer: Grasshopper Manufacture
- Publisher: Namco Bandai Games
- Directed by: Goichi Suda
- Music by: Masafumi Takada; Jun Fukuda
- Genre: Action, shooter
- Platform: PlayStation 2
- Released: JP: August 30, 2006
- Video game

Blood+: Final Piece
- Publisher: Sony Computer Entertainment
- Genre: Adventure RPG
- Platform: PlayStation Portable
- Released: September 7, 2006
- Light novel

Blood#
- Written by: Junichi Fujisaku
- Illustrated by: Chizu Hashii
- Published by: Mag Garden
- Published: February 28, 2017
- Related
- Blood: The Last Vampire (2000 anime film); Blood: The Last Vampire (2009 live-action film); Blood-C (2011 anime series)

Blood+ (stylized in all caps and pronounced "Blood Plus") is a Japanese anime television series co-created and produced by studio Production I.G and entertainment company Aniplex. Written and directed by Junichi Fujisaku, character designed by Akiharu Ishii from original character concept by Chizu Hashii and music composed by Mark Mancina, it is the first anime series in the Blood franchise. Blood+ tells the story of Saya Otonashi, a high school student from Okinawa Island, who encounters hematophagous-bat-like-creatures called Chiropterans and mysterious Haji. She travels the world with Haji and the organization called the Red Shield to eliminate the creatures and its leader, Diva. The series aired on MBS and TBS from October 8, 2005 to September 23, 2006, and licensed for international distribution in several regions through Sony Pictures' international arm, Sony Pictures Television International. Blood+ became its own franchise, with three manga, three light novels, and three video games.

== Plot ==
The series is initially set in September 2005 in Okinawa City (Koza) on Okinawa Island near the US Kadena Air Base. Under the care of her adoptive family, the protagonist Saya Otonashi had been living the life of an anemic amnesiac, but otherwise ordinary schoolgirl. However, her happy life is shattered when she is attacked by a Chiropteran, a hematophagous bat-like creature that lives by feeding on human blood. Saya learns that she is the only one who can defeat them, as her blood causes their bodies to crystallize and shatter. Armed with her special katana, Saya embarks on a journey with her family, friends, allies, and her chevalier Haji, to rid the world of the Chiropteran threat and recover her identity. The course of the journey reveals the background history of the Chiropterans and Saya's mysterious past, which extends into the mid-19th century. Over the course of the series, Saya travels across the world from Japan to Vietnam, Russia, France, the United Kingdom, and finally the United States.

== Production ==
Produced by Production I.G and Aniplex, and directed and written by Junichi Fujisaku, Blood+ was inspired by the 2000 anime film Blood: The Last Vampire; however, there are only a few allusions and basic elements from the film. Fujisaku has been involved with both works, including acting as the director for Blood+ and writing the novelization of Blood: The Last Vampire.

== Media ==
=== Anime ===
The Blood+ anime series premiered in Japan on October 8, 2005, on MBS and TBS, replacing Mobile Suit Gundam SEED Destiny, with a new episode airing weekly for a full year until the final episode aired on September 23, 2006, totaling 50 episodes. The series is directed by Junichi Fujisaku and features original character designs by Chizu Hashii. Each season has separate opening and ending themes from a variety of artists, with the final episode using the season one ending theme. The series simultaneously aired on Animax, Sony's Japanese anime satellite channel, with its networks in Southeast Asia and South Asia also later airing the series.

Through Sony's international division, Blood+ was licensed for distribution in multiple regions. The English dub of the series aired in the United States on Adult Swim, premiering March 11, 2007, and running until March 23, 2008. The English dub also aired in Australia on the Sci Fi Channel and in the Philippines on Studio 23.

The first Region 1 DVDs were released in North America on March 4, 2008, with a simultaneous release of a single five-episode volume and a twenty-five episode box set, Blood+ Part One. Sony continued released individual volumes on a regular basis. Despite that Sony Pictures Television International since 2014 has not completed releasing volume 5 of the first half of the series. Leaving the first half separate releases incomplete. The second half was released in a second box set, Blood+ Part Two, on October 20, 2009. In June 2020 the entire series was added for free streaming in the United States on Tubi before being removed two years later in June 2022.

==== Soundtracks ====
Except for the opening and ending themes, the entire musical score for Blood+ was the work of film score producer Hans Zimmer and noted composer Mark Mancina. Blood+ was the first anime project Mancina worked on, and afterward he stated that working on the project turned him into an anime fan. All of the opening and ending themes were created at Sony Music for the project, after the production team, headed by Yutaka Omatsu, presenting the project concept and Blood+ worldview. The opening and ending themes are performed by a variety of artists, including Hitomi Takahashi, Chitose Hajime, Hyde, Mika Nakashima, Angela Aki, Uverworld, Jinn, and K. In an interview with Production I.G staff, Omatsu noted that he felt Sony did an excellent job of providing music fitting for each season, as did the team of Zimmer and Mancina.

Four CD soundtracks, all produced by Hans Zimmer, have been released in Japan by Sony Music Japan through their Aniplex label. Hagi Plays J.S. Bach (ハジ プレイズ J.S BACH) was released on February 2, 2006. It contains six tracks: selections from Johann Sebastian Bach's Cello Suite No. 5 in C minor (BWV 1011) performed by Nobuo Furukawa (古川展生, Furukawa Nobuo), who is the cellist behind Hagi's playing in the series. The seventh, and final track, is a bonus remix of the music performed by Yoshihiro Hanno (半野喜弘, Hanno Yoshihiro). The soundtrack included a DVD with a special episode telling some of Hagi's backstory and a music video with Furukawa playing the first track, "Prelude" (プレリュード).

The first full soundtrack, Blood+ Original Soundtrack 1, was released on April 26, 2006. It contains fourteen instrumental tracks of background music used during the series and one vocal song "Diva", sung by Elin Carlson, which is the song the character Diva sang in several episodes of the series. On September 27, 2006, Blood+ Original Soundtrack 2 was released with an additional eighteen tracks of instrumental themes from the series. Blood+ Complete Best, released October 25, 2006, is a limited edition compilation set containing a CD, a DVD, and an eighty-page booklet that includes a full episode guide and some final notes from the series production staff. The CD includes the full versions of all eight series' opening and ending theme songs, as well as last two instrumental tracks from the first soundtrack. The DVD contains music videos for each of the theme songs from the CD.

=== Manga ===
To lead up to the Blood+ anime series, three Blood+ manga series were released and published in three different manga magazines. The tankōbon volumes of all three series were published by Kadokawa Shoten. Blood+, by Asuka Katsura, is a five-volume series that first premiered in Monthly Shōnen Ace in July 2005. It covers the same story events as the anime series. Blood+: Adagio was written by Kumiko Suekane. It is a two-volume series that premiered in the September 2005 issue of Beans Ace Magazine and follows Saya and Hagi's experiences during the Russian Revolution. The third series, Blood+: Kowloon Nights, released in Japan as Blood+ Yakōjōshi (BLOOD+ 夜行城市, Blood+ Nocturnal Castle City), is a single tankōbon series by Hirotaka Kisaragi. It premiered in the September issue of Asuka Ciel. Set in Shanghai, it follows Hagi as he searches for Saya and the complications he must deal with. Unlike the other Blood+ manga adaptations, which are both shōnen works, Blood+: Kowloon Nights is a shōjo manga, particularly of the shōnen-ai (or boy's love) genre. All three manga adaptations have been licensed for release in English in North America by Dark Horse Comics.

=== Light novels ===
There are two Japanese light novel adaptations of the Blood+ series. Blood+, written by Ryō Ikehata with illustrations by Chizu Hashii, is the four volume official novel adaptation of the anime series, expanding upon the events of the fifty-episode anime series and giving greater background on the battle against chiropterans. The first volume was released in Japan on May 1, 2006, by Kadokawa Shoten under their male oriented Kadokawa Sneaker Bunko label. The remaining volumes released every four months until the final volume was released on May 1, 2007.

The second adaptation titled Blood+ Russian Rose (BLOOD+ ロシアン・ローズ), is a two-volume series written by Karino Minazuki and illustrated by Ryō Takagi. It was released at the same time as Blood+, with the first volume was released on May 1, 2006, and the second on September 1, 2006. The series, published under Kadokawa's female oriented label Beans Bunko, details Saya and Hagi's lives at the start of the 20th century and the Russian Revolution.

Both novel series have been licensed for release in English in North America by Dark Horse Comics. Dark Horse released the first translated Blood+ novel on March 19, 2008.

In 2017, Fujisaku wrote a third novelization of Blood+, titled Blood#, which takes place after the series finale, focusing on Diva's grown children, Hibiki and Kanade.

=== Video games ===
Two Sony PlayStation 2 video games have been created that are based on the Blood+ series. Both games are currently only available in Japan and have not been licensed for release in any other countries.

Blood+: One Night Kiss, from Namco Bandai Games and Grasshopper Manufacture, is an action-adventure game that was originally released on August 30, 2006. Set in the fictional town of Shikishi, players spend most of the game playing as Saya, occasionally switching to Aoyama, an original character created for the game. Goichi Suda was the game's director and writer in consultation with Fujisaka, while Masafumi Takada was composer. Production was completed on a tight five month schedule so it would release within the anime's broadcast. The cel-shaded graphics based on those of Suda's earlier title Killer7 using a custom-built engine for the PlayStation 2, while the purely urban setting was settled on by Suda as a return to the setting of his earlier game Moonlight Syndrome. The game also establishes itself as a crossover with Suda's The Silver Case with the appearance of employees from the 25th ward in Aoyama's storyline. Suda and the studio were asked to hold back on their established tone, with Suda's initial plan for the game's Saya to be a Chiroptera clone killed at the game's end being vetoed.

Blood+: Sōyoku no Battle Rondo (BLOOD+ 〜双翼のバトル輪舞曲(ロンド)〜) from Sony Entertainment is an adventure game released on July 27, 2006. Set during the year between episodes 32 and 33, after Riku's death, the game alternates between an "Active Demo" section where the player can make decisions that change the story line, and full action sequences where the player, as Saya, fights with her sword to collect chiropteran crystals.

In addition to the two PS2 games, Sony Entertainment released the PSP game Blood+: Final Piece (BLOOD+ 〜ファイナルピース〜) on September 7, 2006. It is an adventure role-playing video game that uses animated sequences from the series as well as new footage created specifically for the game. The game is set during the first season of the series, and features an original story in which Saya, joined by three friends from school, investigates the mystery of her father's disappearance.

A Java game, covering most of the anime's plot is also available.

=== Fan book ===
In September 2006, Newtype released Blood+ Encyclopedia, a special issue fan book that includes interviews with the staff and cast, an episode guide, and information on the related media – the manga, novels and video games.

== Reception ==
When Blood+ first aired in Japan, it was shown in TBS and MBS's 6 p.m. Sunday timeslot, which has been used to air anime since 1993. After Blood+ began airing, the ratings for that time slot began dropping. The drop in viewership became more pronounced after NHK Educational TV's baseball anime Major premiered on a competing time slot.

Carl Kimlinger of Anime News Network gave the series an overall score of B stating, "The plot is propulsive, never lingering for long in one place, yet never rushing to leave. Slickly executed, compulsively watchable and highly entertaining". In December 2005, Blood+ was one of several anime series selected as being a "recommended as an excellent work" at the 9th annual Japanese Media Arts Festival. The series was ranked number 41 on TV Asahi's list of top 100 favorite anime series for 2006.

== See also ==
- List of vampire television series
- Vampire film
