= Jinn (band) =

Japanese rock band

- Origin: Tokyo, Japan
- Genres: Indie rock Alternative rock Alternative metal
- Years active: 2003 – present
- Labels: 3xB RECORDS (2004～2005); Palm Beach Inc. (2006～2008); Epic Records Japan (2008~2009); DefRock Records (2010- )
- Members: Hītan (vocals); Motoki (bass); Haruka (guitars); Tetsuyuki (drums)
- Website: Official website

Jinn (ジン) is a 4-member Japanese rock band. They are part of Sony Music Entertainment Japan's Palm Beach record label.

== History ==
The members of Jinn all attended the same high school, and formed the band in Tokyo in the summer of 2003. In March 2004, the band recorded a demo CD, 0~Zero~ (0～ゼロ～), with 500 copies selling out quickly. l After that in 2005, the band recorded a mini album, Kotosabi no Ki (言錆の樹). In August 2006, the single Raion (雷音) was released, which was featured as the final opening theme to the Blood+ anime series. On November 22 the same year, Jinn also released another single, Malachite (マラカイト, Marakaito).

In 2007, Jinn performed the second opening theme to the Sunrise anime series Code Geass: Lelouch of the Rebellion, Kaidoku Funō (解読不能), which was released on January 31, 2007. Their first full album, Lemmings (レミングス, Remingusu), was released on February 28, 2007. Their second album, Qualia was released on February 6, 2008.

A mini album was released July 2010 entitled 'Engine'.

After 2 years, they returned with 2 singles:Mugen No Hikari/Blue Scale and Rizing. On June 5, 2013, the band released its 3rd album, For The Seeker.

== Members ==
- Hiitan (ひいたん) (vocals)

born March 3, 1987

- Haruka (ハルカ) (guitars, chorus, strings)

born May 16, 1986

- Motoki (もとき) (bass)

born July 10, 1985

- Tetsuyuki (哲之) (drums)

born January 19, 1987

== Discography ==
=== Albums ===
- Lemmings (レミングス, Remingusu) (released on February 28, 2007)
- Qualia (クオリア) (released on February 6, 2008)
- For The Seeker (released on June 5, 2013)

=== Extended plays ===
- Kotosabi no Ki (言錆の樹) (indie release on March 3, 2005; major label release on May 24, 2006)
- Engine (エンジン, Enjin) (released on July 14, 2010)

=== CD-R ===
- 0~Zero~ (0～ゼロ～) (2004)

=== Singles ===
- "Raion" (雷音) (released on August 2, 2006; fourth and final opening theme to Blood+)
- "Malachite" (マラカイト, Marakaito) (released on November 22, 2006)
- "Kaidoku Funō" (解読不能) (released on January 31, 2007; second opening theme to CODE Geass Lelouch of the Rebellion)
- "Vuena Vista" (released on July 18, 2007)
- "Mugen no Hikari／Blue scale" (夢幻の光 / ブルースケール) (released on April 27, 2012)
- "RIZING" (released on May 8, 2013)

=== PV's ===
- "Sō no Te" (創の手)
- "Raion" (雷音)
- "Malachite" (マラカイト, Marakaito)
- "Kaidoku Funō" (解読不能)
- "Vuena Vista"
- "Shishi no Tane" (獅子の種)
- "Hyakumankai Sukida to Itte" (100万回好きだと言って)
- "Mugen no Hikari" (夢幻の光)
- "RIZING"
