= List of The Law of Ueki episodes =

The DVD cover of The Complete Set of the series, released by Geneon Entertainment

The Law of Ueki is an anime television series directed by Hiroshi Watanabe, animated and produced by Studio Deen. The series is based on the manga series of the same name, by Tsubasa Fukuchi. A total of 51 episodes were broadcast by TV Tokyo. Geneon Entertainment picked up the series and broadcast the English dubbed version.

== Episode list ==
No.	Title	Original release date
1	"Kosuke Ueki's Law of Righteousness" "Ueki Kōsuke, Law of Justice"; Transliteration: "Ueki Kōsuke, Seigi no Hōsoku" (Japanese: 植木耕助・正義の法則)	April 4, 2005
Ai Mori had her suspicions of her classmate Kosuke Ueki, who is cleaning the park, but she was even more surprised when she learned that he took a broken part of his broom and turns it into a tree. Ueki is a power user with the ability to change trash into trees, a gift bestowed upon him by his teacher Kobayashi, nicknamed Mr. K, who is part of a grand tournament of 100 king candidates to decide the next King of the Celestial World. Before Ueki can officially be declared Mr. K's fighter, the middle school student must first demonstrate his own sense of justice. Also, each time Ueki uses his powers against a non-power user, he will lose a talent.
2	"The Law of the Battle Commencement!!" "Law of "Battle Start!!""; Transliteration: "Battoru Kaishi!! no Hōsoku" (Japanese: バトル開始 !! の法則)	April 11, 2005
Mori has decided to help Ueki, but realizes there are other competitors challenging him. Two power users cross their paths. One is Seiichiro Sano a decent type with the ability to turn towels into steel, whom they met while trying to rescue a small girl from a fall. Another is Mauro Taira, a less than decent individual who has no problem attacking from behind, and he has the ability to turn water in his mouth into fire. Ueki notices that he can make trees into any type he wants, this time using a chestnut tree so the chestnuts on fire can purposely hit Mauro and burn him, although he wanted to eat them. With Ueki on the brink of winning when Mauro run out of water, Mauro's king candidate Lafferty gives Mauro a refrigerator full of bottled water. Sano then comes and protects Ueki with his steel. Mauro is out of the tournament after eventually losing, while Lafferty is sent to Hell for going against the tournament rules and helping Mauro.
3	"The Law of Talent" "Law of Zai"; Transliteration: "Zai no Hōsoku" (Japanese: 才の法則)	April 18, 2005
Hayao Adachi loves to run track, but has no talent for it. His king candidate plans to reward him with the ability of running if he wins in a race against Ueki, who is technically the fastest runner but never broke the school record since he had to use the restroom. Hayao has trouble catching up to Ueki but eventually tells him that the course is the other way, leading him up the stairs to a temple with a wide enough front to fight. It is revealed that Hayao has the ability is to turn cotton into stakes. Mori tries to interrupt the battle, but she ends up trapped with stakes around her. Ueki ultimately wins without losing his talent. Hayao's king candidate arrives and tells Hayao to give up trying to run track. Being the kindhearted guy that he is, Ueki angrily squishes the face of Hayao's king candidate with two large branches, causing Ueki to lose his ability of running. Although Mori notes that he will never run again, Ueki assures her that he will eventually become a fast runner again if he keeps on trying his hardest.
4	"The Law of Li Ho, the Man of Physical Skills" "Flexible Man, Law of Rihō"; Transliteration: "Taijutsu no Otoko, Rihō no Hōsoku" (Japanese: 体術の男・李崩の法則)	April 25, 2005
Mori is determined to learn more about this tournament so she leaps at the opportunity to gain such information from Mr. K. During their talks they are interrupted by another power user, though this one is different unlike Ueki's previous opponents. Li Ho prefers to use his own body to fight rather than his given ability. When Li Ho starts smashing Ueki's trees with his bare hands, Ueki manages to hold, though not even the talent of sarcasm can help our hero. Li Ho unleashes his most powerful attack called The Count of Monte Cristo, which Ueki manages to stop by grabbing Li Ho's shoulders, so he cannot move his arms.
5	"The Law of Robert Haydn, the Strongest Power User" "The Strongest Ability-Holder, Law of Robert Haydn"; Transliteration: "Saikyō Nōryoku-sha Roberuto Haidon no Hōsoku" (Japanese: 最強能力者ロベルト・ハイドンの法則)	May 2, 2005
With another win and another talent under his belt, Ueki is able to relax for a little bit. When traveling by train one day, he meets Junichi Baba, nicknamed B.J., a hip-hop enthusiast who takes an immediate liking to Ueki. Strangely, B.J. lies that his name is Robert Haydn when he discovers that Ueki is also a power user. Fortunately, B.J.'s ability to turn coins into wind is not enough to stop Ueki. The two part on friendly terms, but the real Robert then shows up.
6	"The Law of Farewell" "Law of Goodbye"; Transliteration: "Saraba no Hōsoku" (Japanese: さらばの法則)	May 9, 2005
Mr. K forbids Ueki from challenging Robert, saying that Robert is just too strong for Ueki. Upon learning that Robert has viciously attacked B.J., Ueki just gets angry and becomes determined to challenge him. Ueki and Robert meet, and Mr. K's words were correct. Robert is able to deflect every attack that Ueki sends at him with his bubbles that can control gravity. Ueki is about to pay the ultimate price for his foolishness, but Mr. K luckily steps in with a last-second rescue. However, king candidates are forbidden from helping their power users.
7	"The Law of Mr. K" "Law of Kobasen"; Transliteration: "Kobasen no Hōsoku" (Japanese: コバセンの法則)	May 16, 2005
With Mr. K sent to Hell, Ueki is uncertain what he should be doing anymore. In search of answers he goes to Mr. K's home where he finds an interesting file on his computer. It seems that Mr. K has been paying close attention to Ueki, making note of every kind act the boy does. Understanding the faith that Mr. K had in him, Ueki is determined more than ever to win this tournament and keep the Talent of Blank away from those that would abuse the power. With a new king candidate named Yodogawa, nicknamed Yo-chan, backing him, Ueki takes on the next challenge, where he faces Bolo T, a power user with the ability to turn his forehead into diamond.
8	"Fair and Square! The Law of Onimon" "Fair and Square! Law of Onimon"; Transliteration: "Seisei Dōdō! Onimon no Hōsoku" (Japanese: 正々堂々！鬼紋の法則)	May 23, 2005
During a run-in with some bullies, Ueki and Mori meet Monjiro Oniyama, nicknamed Onimon, a very strong fighter with a sense of fair play. It turns out that he is also a power user with the ability to turn the dirt that he kicks into cannonballs. Clearly outmatched by Onimon's 299 talents, Ueki is at a disadvantage in this fight. Worst of all, Onimon is not a bad guy, only wanting the Talent of Blank in order to restore his home village to its former glory. Ueki must be able to muster up enough determination to beat Onimon and his philosophy of "fair and square" fighting.
9	"The Law of Training Under Onimon" "Law of Onimon's Training"; Transliteration: "Onimon no Tokkun no Hōsoku" (Japanese: 鬼紋の特訓の法則)	May 30, 2005
After being defeated, Onimon warns Ueki to beware the Black Shadow. With Onimon's help, Ueki learns about a strategy that he can use against this new threat. When Ueki finally does meet up with the Black Shadow, Onimon's training seems to work. Although the Black Shadow has the ability to turn his own shadows into clay clones, Ueki is unsure whether or not the Black Shadow is the real deal.
10	"The Law of Non-Rewarding Justice" "Law of Justice That Never Comes"; Transliteration: "Mukuwarenu Seigi no Hōsoku" (Japanese: むくわれぬ正義の法則)	June 6, 2005
The clay clones just keep coming no matter how many of them that Ueki takes down. Despite these overwhelming odds, Ueki still fights the Black Shadow, whose real name is Kuroki Kageo. Upon learns about the horrible event that lead to the Black Shadow joining the Robert's Ten, Ueki is determined to get through to him. Hoping to convey his own sense of justice, Ueki slowly reaches him. When the two finally start to fight on equal terms, another power user shows up to put a stop to this fight by attacking the Black Shadow.
11	"The Law of the Robert's Ten" "Law of Robert's Ten"; Transliteration: "Roberuto Jūdan no Hōsoku" (Japanese: ロベルト十団」の法則)	June 13, 2005
Kamui Rosso, nicknamed the White Shadow, has the ability to turn his own shadow into a robot that is hard to beat, and he is Ueki's opponent now. Ueki is still able to pull off a victory in the end with some inventive tree manipulation. Now that Ueki has beaten a member of the Robert's Ten, he gains their attention and is invited to join them. Not wanting to waste this opportunity to challenge Robert and his gifted allies, he accepts and heads to their headquarters. Upon meeting the Robert's Ten, he immediately makes a bad impression and even manages to insult Robert himself.
12	"The Law of the Celestials" "Law of the Heavenly Beings"; Transliteration: "Tenkaijin no Hōsoku" (Japanese: 天界人の法則)	June 20, 2005
Ueki is test for displeasing Robert. If Ueki can manage to stand with a large stone block on his back for three days, then he will be a member of the Robert's Ten. Meanwhile, some new information is found out about Ueki. Mori discovers that Ueki was actually adopted, and Mr. K finds out that Ueki is actually a celestial sent to Earth as a baby. While this is certainly useful information, it does not help Ueki now that he has revealed his true intentions to Alessio Juliano, who has the ability to turn dirt into scythes.
13	"The Law of the Celestial Beast" "Law of the Heavenly Beast"; Transliteration: "Tenkaijū no Hōsoku" (Japanese: 天界獣の法則)	June 27, 2005
Just when the fight is about to commence, a large fox-like beast, later given the name Tenko, erupts from the ground. Tenko is apparently a celestial beast who was searching for Ueki in order to eat him, though this monster is unimpressed upon meeting him. Ueki has not even awaken any of his sacred weapons, yet he lives to do the impossible and manages to gain two sacred weapons within a short time. Tenko seems impressed by this and agrees to help Ueki, despite his hatred for the celestials that have treated him so poorly.
14	"The Law of the Awakening Chamber" "Law of the Awakening Organs"; Transliteration: "Kakusei Zōki no Hōsoku" (Japanese: 覚醒臓器の法則)	July 4, 2005
Ueki returns to the hideout of the Robert's Ten and tries to trick them with a lie about Alessio's whereabouts, but the lie does not last long. Just as he blurts out the truth that he defeated Alessio, Don grabs Ueki by the head and races off. Ueki shows off his newfound power by smashing a rock with the one-star sacred weapon Kurogane, but Don uses his ability to turn a ring into a rocket and obliterates a large chunk of the landscape. Ueki is no match for this strong opponent, but luckily Tenko has a method for Ueki to get stronger. However, Ueki might die if it does not work out.
15	"The Law of Rinko" "Law of Rinko"; Transliteration: "Rinko no Hōsoku" (Japanese: 鈴子の法則)	July 11, 2005
Upon defeating Don, Ueki is challenged by two more power users. Marco Maldini has the ability to turn tomatoes into magma, while Rinko Jerrard has the ability to turn beads into bombs. A tired Ueki is not up to the challenge of facing two strong opponents at once. However, Rinko takes notice of Ueki's selflessness and begins to wonder what kind of people she has been surrounding herself with.
16	"The Law of Neo, the New Celestial" "Law of Neo"; Transliteration: "Shin Tenkaibito (Neo) no Hōsoku" (Japanese: 新天界人（ネオ）の法則)	July 18, 2005
Ueki is completely worn out after fighting four members of the Robert's Ten. Tenko and Rinko do their best to give Ueki some time to heal, but the remaining members are not making it easy on them. Ogre has the ability to turn his bamboo sword into hedge clippers, while Becky Wolf has the ability to turn her BB bullets into meteorites, but they are unable to get past Tenko's barrier. However, the barrier is broken through by Taro Myojin, who has the ability to turn his whistles into laser beams. With Tenko and Rinko out of the fight, it is up to a revived Ueki to set things right.
17	"The Law of Two Powers" "Law of Two Powers"; Transliteration: "Futatsu no Chikara no Hōsoku" (Japanese: 二つの能力（ちから）の法則)	July 25, 2005
Having kept it a secret from the rest of the Robert's Ten, Myojin has a second ability to turn cards into buzzsaws. Myojin has the upper hand when he forces Ueki into the direct path of his laser beams. Choosing not to give up easily, Ueki discovers a method of attack that wins the fight. With nine members of the Robert's Ten defeated, it would seem Ueki has earned a well-deserved rest. Unfortunately, a plea from Sano's king candidate Inumaru, nicknamed Wanko, puts Ueko back into the thick of things.
18	"The Law of the Bloodcurdling Dogra Mansion!" "Tremble! Law of Dogura Mansion"; Transliteration: "Senritsu! Dogura Manshon no Hōsoku" (Japanese: 戦慄！ドグラマンションの法則)	August 1, 2005
Ueki is invited to a party hosted by Robert, though Rinko is not too happy about Ueki attending it. Team Ueki still goes and meets the remaining members of the Robert's Ten, including Sano, the man whom Ueki is intent on saving. Robert intends to have the two groups fight with the possibility of winning a special request from Robert. The first fight is Ueki versus Yunpao, a power user with the seemingly ridiculous ability to turn electricity into sugar.
19	"The Law of the Cossack Dance" "Law of Cossack Dance"; Transliteration: "Kosakku Dansu no Hōsoku" (Japanese: コサックダンスの法則)	August 8, 2005
Ueki finally finds out about Yunpao's weakness and goes on the attack. With one win on their side, it is Mori's turn to fight, but she does not any powers. Her opponent is Kabara, a very talented hunter with the power to turn a cape into wings. With plenty of ammunition and expert marksmanship, it seems like a lopsided fight. Luckily, what Mori lacks in power, she more than makes up for in cunning and intelligence.
20	"The Law of Cat and Mouse" "Law of Cat and Mouse"; Transliteration: "Neko to Nezumi no Hōsoku" (Japanese: ネコとねずみの法則)	August 15, 2005
It is Rinko versus Kabara, and they fight in the cat field. The objective is to get the opponent to get eaten by a cat, in which one must slap the cat's nose in order to turn their opponent into a mouse. Thanks to her talent of flying, Kabara seems to have the advantage, but Rinko has a few tricks up her sleeves.
21	"The Law of Seiichiro Sano" "Law of Sano Seiichiro"; Transliteration: "Sano Seiichirō no Hōsoku" (Japanese: 佐野清一郎の法則)	August 22, 2005
Ueki is up against none other than Sano, the power user that he was trying to save in the jump rope field. Sano is not cutting Ueki any slack when he goes right into attack mode. With Sano countering every attack Ueki sends his way, Ueki is going to have to get creative in order to win this battle. As it turns out, this is what Sano wanted from the beginning.
22	"The Law of Inumaru" "Law of Inumaru"; Transliteration: "Inumaru no Hōsoku" (Japanese: 犬丸の法則)	August 29, 2005
Sano joined the Robert's Ten specifically to rescue Wanko from a devious attack by Carl P. Accio, nicknamed Carpaccio. Using a Death Pentagon, an insect that can instantly kill a celestial being, Carpaccio forced Sano either to join or to watch Wanko die. But Wanko's sense of justice will not stand for these conditions. He breaks the cardinal rule of this tournament, in that a king candidate can only grant powers to one individual. When he gives Mori a power of her own, he is instantly sent to Hell, freeing Sano of the grasp of the Robert's Ten. This only serves to infuriate Ueki even more. With a challenge made to Carpaccio, a new fight begins. But Carpaccio has a surprising ability to mimic the abilities of other power users. With all the power of the Robert's Ten at Carpaccio's disposal, Ueki is in for a tough fight.
23	"The Law of Ueki vs the Robert's Ten" "Law of Ueki VS Ten"; Transliteration: "Ueki VS Jūdan no Hōsoku" (Japanese: 植木VS十団の法則)	September 5, 2005
Carpaccio may be able to copy the abilities of the rest of the Robert's Ten, but this is not advantageous enough to defeat Ueki. With the six-star sacred weapon Raika at his disposal Ueki is running circles around Carpaccio, yet this vile Carpaccio has a few more tricks to pull. He has two more abilities unknown to everyone, which are the ability to receive the opponent's thoughts via text messages and the ability to change positions with the opponent. Ueki is seemingly overwhelmed at this turn of events. With some help from Tenko, Ueki comes up with a plan that gives him the win. So now with three wins, Team Ueki wins the challenge and some pretty cheesy prizes. However, Ueki wants more, specifically a fight with Robert.
24	"The Law of Young Robert" "Law of Young Robert"; Transliteration: "Shōnen Roberuto no Hōsoku" (Japanese: 少年ロベルトの法則)	September 12, 2005
Ueki finally has his rematch with Robert. Thanks to Rinko, Ueki even gets an insight into Robert's tragic past. This does not stop Ueki from wanting to fight the leader of the Robert's Ten. Unfortunately for Ueki, Robert reveals the true nature of his power, in which he has the ability to turn any ideal into a reality. With such an unlimited power at his disposal, Robert is able to strengthen his own sacred weapons so that Ueki is no match for him. Robert calls this the level two ability, his being to manipulate gravity on whatever his ideal objects touch. Always up for the challenge, Ueki seemingly finds his own level two ability, which is the ability to summon more than one sacred weapon at a time.
25	"Resurrection! The Law of Mr. K" "Resurrection! Law of Kobasen"; Transliteration: "Fukkatsu! Kobasen no Hōsoku" (Japanese: 復活！コバセンの法則)	September 19, 2005
Ueki's sense of justice will not let down anyone including his enemies, but showing an act of kindness to Robert does nothing to warm his over. If nothing else, it just motivates Robert to further his attacks. When Ueki looks like he is down for the count, it is up to Sano and Rinko to take on Robert. With a surprising display of teamwork, the two of them show Robert how powerful friendship truly is, but Robert's twisted ideals prove too much for even them. Ueki somehow finds the strength to push on, standing up after the beating that he already took. No matter what Ueki does to Robert, the villain will not give up either. Only an unexpected ally can put an end to this fight.
26	"Terror! The Law of Hanon" "Terror! Law of Anon"; Transliteration: "Kyōfu! Anon no Hōsoku" (Japanese: 恐怖！アノンの法則)	September 26, 2005
Mr. K returns from Hell on a mission from The King of the Celestial World. It seems that the tournament is split in two parts. With the one-on-one duels officially ended, the team battles come next. A ceasefire has been declared and some good news has been delivered, which is Mr. K and Inumaru can be king candidates again. While Team Ueki recovers, an introspective Robert starts to wonder about his own motives. A talk with his "father" clarifies things, introducing the new threat of Hanon, a very talented celestial who is the true son of Margarette.
27	"The Law of Hideyoshi" "Law of Hideyoshi"; Transliteration: "Hideyoshi no Hōsoku" (Japanese: ヒデヨシの法則)	October 3, 2005
When discussing the latest developments with Robert, Team Ueki is met by the aide of the King of the Celestial World, who explains the rules of the upcoming team tournament. Wanting another member, they go in search of a gifted power user by the name of Hideyoshi Soya. He is a power user who has the ability to change his voice into a portrait, but he prefers trickery over fighting. Surprised by what they find, Team Ueki follows Hideyoshi back to the House of the Sun, where Hideyoshi helps take care of orphaned children. It turns out that Ueki and Mori are not the first to ask him to join a team. Hideyoshi's king candidate Zack has a nasty gang in mind, but Hideyoshi refuses to comply and chooses to stay with the kids instead. A wicked power user in Zack's gang steals away with Kentaro, one of the residents of the House of the Sun, prompting Ueki and Hideyoshi to run off and get him back.
28	"The Law of the House of the Sun" "Law of House of Taiyou"; Transliteration: "Taiyō no Ie no Hōsoku" (Japanese: たいようの家の法則)	October 10, 2005
Zack has a gang of power users that want to destroy the House of the Sun so that Hideyoshi will not refuse to join anymore. The plan has to change when Hideyoshi shows up. This lying power user does his best to avoid the attacks of Mario and Capucho. Mario has the ability to change his body into a giant billiards ball, while Capucho has the ability to change his voice into a freezing gas. However, Hideyoshi succumbs to their onslaught and leaves the House of the Sun unguarded. Lying on the ground, Hideyoshi suddenly remembers his former king candidate Nero, a kindhearted celestial who just wanted to help out humans. Fortunately, Ueki makes a timely arrival to stop the House of the Sun from being destroyed, but he is outnumbered three to one. Capucho reveals that his ability of changing his voice into a freezing gas has a level two ability that completely freezes something and allows him to smash it easily.
29	"Don't Die! The Law of Tenko" "Law of Immortal Tenko"; Transliteration: "Shinanaide Tenko no Hōsoku" (Japanese: 死なないでテンコの法則)	October 17, 2005
Tenko is grateful to Ueki because Ueki has given Tenko a friendship, a purpose and treasured memories. However, Tenko will die if he raises Ueki to the nine-star level. Knowing that Ueki will refuse to reach the ninth-star level if Tenko reveals this secret, Tenko believes that Ueki needs to get stronger in order to face his opponents. Unsure about what to do, Tenko decides to give his life for Ueki's quest to become stronger. After all, it was the first time in a long while that Tenko has felt needed and he appreciates it so much. When Mori finds out about this secret, she rushes off to stop Tenko from raising Ueki to the next level, only to be too late. Ueki is already inside of the awakening chamber, unable to hear Mori from the outside.
30	"The Law of the Third Round" "Law of the Tertiary Selection"; Transliteration: "Sanji Senkō no Hōsoku" (Japanese: 三次選考の法則)	October 24, 2005
Team Ueki is ready to start the team tournament stage. They make way to Heaven, where they meet four other teams of power users whom they are meant to battle. The King of the Celestial World makes an appearance to explain the rules for the team tournament stage. With his usual penchant for eccentricities, the King of the Celestial World starts off with a treasure hunting battle by sending the two teams to their destination via a celestial pachinko method. Team Ueki's is up against the Team Grano. Right from the start, Ueki is up against Guitar, a music-loving guy in a full black suit. Guitar seemingly has the ability to change his voice into a shockwave. Ueki attacks him with everything he has, but Guitar just shakes off the attacks, claiming to be invulnerable.
31	"The Law of the Strongest Tag Team" "Law of the Strongest Tag"; Transliteration: "Saikyō Taggu no Hōsoku" (Japanese: 最強タッグの法則)	October 31, 2005
With one win, Team Ueki looks optimistic, but a new challenge awaits the group. This time around, Sano and Rinko will have to face a pair of power users that defeat opponents by combining each other's abilities. Mūnin has the ability to turn bad puns into reality when the opponent laughs, while Pastello has the ability to turn any line drawing into a portal which he uses to tickle the intended opponent. Sano and Rinko are competent on their own, but lately they have been getting on each other's nerves. If they want to win this battle, they will have to find a way to look past each other's flaws and work together as a team.
32	"The Law of True Strength!" "Law of True Strength!"; Transliteration: "Hontō no Tsuyosa! no Hōsoku" (Japanese: 本当の強さ！の法則)	November 7, 2005
Ueki talks with Pecol, who wishes to be strong just like Ueki. Inspired by Ueki's defeat of Guitar, Pecol decides to quit working with Team Grano. Upon confronting his teammate Grano about this, Pecol is verbally deflated and submits to Grano's whims. Having the ability to turn toy models into the real objects, Grano summons a giant robot to combat Ueki. With no robot of his own, Ueki must rely on his own abilities. With a bit of ingenuity, Ueki knocks down the first robot, but Grano summons another more powerful machine.
33	"Clash! The Law of Ueki vs Li Ho" "Assault! Law of Ueki VS Rihō"; Transliteration: "Gekitotsu! Ueki VS Rihō no Hōsoku" (Japanese: 激突！植木VS李崩の法則)	November 14, 2005
Team Ueki has just walked away from their first win, but their next opponent won their match within five minutes. While Ueki quietly ponders this, Li Ho shows up and challenges Ueki to stand still until sunset, promising to concede Ueki's chances at victory in the upcoming match against Team Marilyn. Ueki starts to attack, but Li Ho is able to deflect everything thrown at him. Still not relying on his gifted power, Li Ho has developed some new attacks using his own inner power. Li Ho knocks aside Ueki's Pick, then stops Ueki's Kurogane in midair. As Li Ho reveals his secret about channeling his own inner power, Ueki soon mimics this trick.
34	"The Law of Team Marilyn" "Law of Marilyn Team"; Transliteration: "Maririn Chiimu no Hōsoku" (Japanese: マリリンチームの法則)	November 21, 2005
While Team Ueki is getting ready to face Team Marilyn, Yo-chan visits Hell in order to talk with Mr. K and Wanko. As Yo-chan returns with an encouraging message, Team Ueki gets fired up for their next battle. They fight in Gentle Ghost Town, a deserted area inhabited by ghosts. Each team member is given a pendant to wear that is given certain point values. Each team has to take the pendants from their opponents in order to win. While exploring their battlefield, Team Ueki is surprised to find that Team Marilyn has already established a plan of attack. Poorly prepared for their opponents' resourcefulness, Team Ueki falls prey to their battle strategy and quickly lose Rinko in the process. Making a quick escape, Ueki tells his teammates to go on without him. Facing Team Marilyn on his own, Ueki tries to buy his friends time to come up with their own plan of attack.
35	"The Law of "You Tricked Me!"" "Law of You Tricked Me!"; Transliteration: "Hakattanaaaaaa! no Hōsoku" (Japanese: はかったなあぁぁああ！の法則)	November 28, 2005
Team Marilyn is greatly amused upon realizing Ueki is just stalling for time. Revealing their history of growing up on the battlefield, Ueki finally understands just how combative these opponents are. Leaving Baron to deal with Ueki, the other members of Team Marilyn give chase to the remaining members of Team Ueki. Baron does not let Ueki follow them. Determined to keep his opponent busy, Baron attacks Ueki with his close combat knife fighting, a specialty of his. Being more useful that it appears, Baron has the ability to transport himself to wherever he throws his knife, which leaves little maneuverability for Ueki. When Ueki adjusts his fighting style to combat this ability, Baron reveals his level two ability allows him to immobilize himself and any opponent within one meter of where he reappears.
36	"The Law of the Proof of Friendship" "Law of Proof of Friendship"; Transliteration: "Nakama no Shōmei no Hōsoku" (Japanese: 仲間の証明の法則)	December 5, 2005
While Ueki is busy trying to reunite with his teammates, Sano, Mori and Hideyoshi face the remaining members of Team Marilyn. Being the only fighter with offensive capabilities, Sano decides to protect the others. Despite doing fine, Sano is rescued at the last second by Mori, proving that he can depend on his friends for support. Putting has the ability to turn his mouth into a fourth-dimensional portal, while Memory has the ability to turn her blueprints into completed objects. Using their own strategies, Sano, Mori and Hideyoshi are able to counter traps set by Putting and Memory. This ends with Team Marilyn losing Putting. Faced with dwindling numbers, they choose this moment to reveal their secret weapon. Matthew has the ability to change his two arms into six arms, all holding rapid fire guns. Sano manages to protect his teammates from the brunt of Matthew's attacks. However, Marilyn Carrey is back, and she is looking to put an end to their resistance.
37	"The Law of the Weakness of the Sacred Weapons" "Law of the Sacred Weapon's Weakness"; Transliteration: "Jinki no Jyakuten no Hōsoku" (Japanese: 神器の弱点の法則)	December 12, 2005
Sano, Mori and Hideyoshi face the remaining members of Team Marilyn. While Sano does his best to protect his friends, Hideyoshi jump at the chance to escape, but he is reminded from a past moment to overcome his own cowardice. Sano, Mori and Hideyoshi distract Team Marilyn and manage to escape, only to be ensnared once again by Marilyn. With Hideyoshi out of the battle, Marilyn tells them that their situation is hopeless, explaining that not even Ueki can save them. However, Ueki lives to do the impossible and manages to come just in time to save Sano from a lethal blow. Proving that his sacred treasures are underestimated, Team Ueki is ready to fight on. The King of the Celestial World interrupts, revealing that Marilyn and Mori are the bearers of the ten point necklaces. This causes everyone to split up.
38	"The Law of Sano's Awakening!!" "Law of Sano, Awake!!"; Transliteration: "Sano, Kakusei!! no Hōsoku" (Japanese: 佐野・覚醒!!の法則)	December 19, 2005
Ueki is left to face Marilyn, who can dodge every single attack that Ueki throws at her. After some careful testing, Ueki discovers that Marilyn has the ability to stretch one second into ten seconds, thus being able to attack and move at seemingly rapid speeds. Marilyn is quick to display how advantageous this power truly is on an unfortunate Ueki. Meanwhile, Sano is left to face Matthew, who shoots down everything that Sano throws at him. As Matthew claims that Sano has a worthless ability, Sano thinks otherwise since it came from Wanko. Wishing that he could be stronger to make better use of this power, he discovers his level two ability can turn his iron into a powerful magnet. With his guns and bullets rendered useless, Matthew relentlessly attacks Sano with uncanny close-range fighting using six brass batons as an ace in the hole.
39	"The Law of the Closed Heart" "Law of the Sealed Heart"; Transliteration: "Tozasareta Kororo no Hōsoku" (Japanese: 閉ざされた心の法則)	December 26, 2005
Marilyn continues her assault on Ueki, leaving him with no chance for defense. No matter what Ueki tries in terms of strategy, Marilyn's ability is too much of an advantage. However, Ueki notices that Marilyn relies on practiced fighting patterns as her weakness. Planning to counter her moves, Ueki stops upon noticing tears coming from Marilyn's eyes. Ueki realizes that Marilyn truly does not want to fight, and he refuses to go on with this battle. This infuriates Marilyn, forcing her to make use of her level two ability, which can double her attack power. As Ueki still refuses to fight, Marilyn recalls childhood memories that she would rather forget.
40	"The Law of Wonderful Love" "Law of Wonderful "Ai""; Transliteration: "Subarashii "Ai" no Hōsoku" (Japanese: 素晴らしい"あい"の法則)	January 2, 2006
Mori faces Memory all by herself. Still unsure of her power, she tries to bluff for time while waiting for her teammates. Unfortunately, Sano cannot hear her cries for help, and Ueki just passed out. Left on her own, Mori can only run away from the battle-experienced Memory. Mori tries desperately to solve the mystery of her power, trying out every idea that pops in her head. When she is close to defeat, Mori figure out that she has the ability to make her opponent a lover of eyeglasses. Completely enthralled by Mori's eyeglasses, Memory has no choice but to do what Mori says, breaking her beloved eyeglasses before knocking herself out, which gives Team Ueki another win. While Team Ueki recuperates, they get a visit from Marilyn. The next day, Team Ueki gets ready to face Team Capucho. Before they can show up, Hanon stands in their way, determined to keep them from their appointed fight. Hanon refuses to let Ueki face weak opponents and decides to take them on himself.
41	"The Law of the Real and Fake" "Law of the Real Thing and the Impersonator"; Transliteration: "Honmono to Nisemono no Hōsoku" (Japanese: 本物と偽者の法則)	January 9, 2006
Sore about being ambushed by Hanon, Team Ueki chooses not to dwell on this situation. They decide to take some time to relax at home on Earth. Heading home to his adoptive family, Ueki finally reveals the current events, including him being from Heaven and his current fight for the next King of the Celestial World. His adoptive family takes everything in stride, especially upon seeing Tenko appear from Ueki's arm. Upon returning to Heaven, Ueki has a run-in with his celestial father Pag. Despite being at odds with Ueki, Pag asks if he prefers the real or fake, and Ueki replies that he prefers the real. Feeling deflated when Ueki sees his adoptive father as real, Pag understands that he does not have a place in Ueki's life anymore. Pag leaves Ueki with the secret to obtaining the level two ability as a parting gift.
42	"The Law of Team Barrow" "Law of Barrow Team"; Transliteration: "Barou Chiimu no Hōsoku" (Japanese: バロウチームの法則)	January 16, 2006
Team Ueki is up against Team Barrow. With Rinko going first, her opponent is Ban Dicoot. Tenko notices that all members of Team Barrow are celestials. They were all brought together for this tournament in order to support Hanon and Margarette's wish to become the next King of the Celestial World. Ban can make use of the sacred weapons just like Ueki, but Rinko is forced to hold back her attacks since something is different. Ban has the ability to turn inanimate objects into living things with adorable faces. Although she takes the abuse rather than fight back, Rinko snaps when Ban starts insulting her. She executes a powerful slap using a specifically designed glove, smacking both Ban and his adorable Pick into submission. Returning to her frightened friends victorious, she retains no knowledge of her strange transformation. With Sano going next, his opponent is Diegostar, who has the ability to make objects invisible. Since Diegostar mainly uses his sacred weapons, it is impossible for Sano to see the oncoming attacks. Sano tries to outsmart his opponent, but Diegostar is no slouch in the brains department either.
43	"The Law of the Cutesy Pose" "Law of Goody-Two-Shoes Pose"; Transliteration: "Burikko Poozu no Hōsoku" (Japanese: ぶりっ娘ポーズの法則)	January 23, 2006
Taking Diegostar's advice to heart, Sano propels himself by using his magnetic track and rams directly into Diegostar, though Diegostar grasps victory by a powerful bluff while Sano was in a null zone. As the scores are tied at one, Mori is next to face Kill Norton, who has an IQ of 179. Mori eventually manages to trick Kill Norton to do the cutesy pose with some help from Hideyoshi. However, Kill Norton refuses to knock himself out since it would damage his own eyeglasses. After accidentally destroy both of her eyeglasses, Mori surprisingly reveals a backpack full of fake eyeglasses from the Hundred Yen Store. Mori cunningly threatens to break all of them with a huge rock if Kill Norton does not use his head as a shield, giving Team Ueki another win. An already tired and injured Sano is up against Barrow Escarotte. As Barrow reveals his ability, he cruelly knocks out Sano before the latter has as chance to tell his teammates. An angry Ueki is up against Barrow, but Tenko shockingly reveals that Ueki is now a zero-star celestial, a severe handicap in this fight.
44	"The Law of Ueki's Level 2" "Law of Ueki, Level 2!"; Transliteration: "Ueki, Reberu 2! no Hōsoku" (Japanese: 植木・レベル2！の法則)	January 30, 2006
Despite being ready for the fight, Ueki has all of his sacred weapon removed and he did not fully master his ability in order to attain the level two ability. Getting rid of his celestial powers, Ueki fends of Barrow's multiple attacks by creatively turning trash into trees, though still unable to make head or tail of Barrow's ability. Sano regains consciousness and reveals that Barrow has the ability to turn past images into current reality, meaning his previous attacks can spur up at any moment. While Ueki contemplates this, a conversation between Mr. K and Wanko explains that Ueki's ability can be continually reused, unlike other power users, changing trash to trees and back to trash. Mr. K reveals that if Ueki can master his level two ability, it would completely change the course of the tournament.
45	"The Law of the Past Attack" "Law of the Attack from the Past"; Transliteration: "Kako Kara no Kōgeki no Hōsoku" (Japanese: 過去からの攻撃の法則)	February 6, 2006
Ueki has finally attained his level two ability, in which he can revert the abilities of others back to their original state. With Barrow no longer having the upper hand, he still hopes that he could overwhelm Ueki. In the past, Barrow lived peacefully with his mother until he accidentally used Kurogane on her, resulting in a comatose state. Barrow desperately tried to awaken his mothers with pictures, but to no avail. One day, burgulars came to his home and tried to attack his mother, but she finally awoke in fright at the sight of Barrow's Kurogane being activated. Barrow left in a rush, running into Margarette and the future Team Barrow. In the present, Ueki manages to avoid all of Barrow's attacks, finally pinning down Barrow after landing a powerful Pick. With Team Ueki acquiring another win, The King of the Celestial World is watching this while his aide is furious for hiding the fact that an Infernal is taking part in the tournament. The King of the Celestial World then explains how he came to create this tournament. He talks about the Guardian clan, the Infernals in Hell wanting to take over Heaven. It all started when he met a young girl on Earth named Haruko Ueki.
46	"The Law of the King, the Maiden and the Future" "Law of God, the Girl and the Future"; Transliteration: "Kami to Shōjo to Mirai no Hōsoku" (Japanese: 神と少女と未来の法則)	February 20, 2006
In the past, the King of the Celestial World saved Haruko from bullies, and she tried to repay him, force-feeding him several plates of curry among a whole mess of other things. The King of the Celestial World is eventually able to escape, but he finds an elderly woman whose foot is stuck in a railroad track. When Haruko tries to help the elderly woman, the King of the Celestial World witnesses their determination, bravery and optimism towards the future, convincing him to save both of them, despite the fact that he cannot interfere with life and death situations on Earth. He decided to create the tournament, planning to change the hearts of the Infernals and persuade them to abstain from taking over Heaven. In the present, he confronts Margarette, whose body was devoured and assumed by an Infernal, just like Robert. It is also revealed that Haruko was actually Ueki's adoptive mother, as Team Ueki commemorates her death with a plate of curry. The fight between the King of the Celestial World and Margarette ends in a draw. They finally pull out the ten-star sacred weapon Archenemy, though it is not revealed exactly.
47	"The Law of Hanon the King" "Law of Anon Who Became God"; Transliteration: "Kami ni Natta Anon no Hōsoku" (Japanese: 神になったアノンの法則)	February 27, 2006
Everyone contemplates as the final round approaches. Ueki gives his amulet to Mori, and Hideyoshi concludes that he is useless and a hindrance while sitting on a cliff. While walking in the forest, Sano believes that Rinko still loves Robert. The King of the Celestial World and Margarette are at a standstill in their battle, despite the King of the Celestial World secretly having a powerful item that would give him the edge, though he wanted to reform Margarette. Suddenly, Hanon uses a powerful Ranma to slice through the King of the Celestial World, unexpectedly leaving him bleeding on the floor. Revealing his true intentions which does not involve Margarette or the Guardian clan, Hanon takes over the fourth round and changes the rules by taking Mr. Stopper, a precious rule-changing device that belongs to the King of the Celestial World. Hanon then possesses the powers of the King of the Celestial World after devouring. Using Mr. Stopper, Hanon announces that the fourth round will start as soon as possible instead of the following morning.
48	"The Law of the Fourth Round" "Law of the Fourth Election"; Transliteration: "Daiyonji Senkoku no Hōsoku" (Japanese: 第四次選考の法則)	March 6, 2006
As per the rules, the first to make it to Hanon must defeat him to win, lest Hanon will destroy everyone. While Hanon hides in his floating battlefield, everyone attempts to meet up with him. Margarette threatens Ueki then goes after Mori. However, due to Ueki's determination to stop Hanon, Margarette reveals his true form as a celestial beast in human form, which is the secret of the Guardian clan. Meanwhile, Li Ho is the first to meet up with Hanon, and they fight. Li Ho stands up pretty well against Hanon, managing to block most incoming attacks and show an impressive display of power as usual. After a long battle, Li Ho is eventually no match for Hanon, being defeated by him. Just as Li Ho faints, Sano and Rinko show up ready to fight, but Ban and Diegostar also show up to assist.
49	"The Law of the Ten Star" "Law of the Ten Stars"; Transliteration: "Jūtsu Hoshi no Hōsoku" (Japanese: 十ツ星の法則)	March 13, 2006
The group fights Hanon and a long battle ensues. However, even Ban and Diegostar's combination attack and Sano's off-screen special attack prove ineffective. Meanwhile, Ueki begins training inside of the awakening chamber of Margarette. While running to meet up with everyone at the floating battlefield, Mori is stopped by Kill Norton, who pleads with her to use her ability on him so he can help his teammates fight. She does so after he explains the importance of Ban and Diegostar. With Ban, Diegostar and Kill Norton now reunited, they can perform their special combination attack. Unfortunately, Hanon takes out Kill Norton while they were powering up. Hanon proceeds to take everyone else out until Mori remains. Grabbing her by the throat, Hanon drags her to a cliff, explaining that he never understood happiness as a member of the Guardian clan. He started believing that happiness was a path devoid of hindrances, and that meant destroying everyone. Just as Hanon drops Mori off the cliff, Ueki becomes a ten-star celestial and catches Mori using his nine-star sacred weapon Seiku.
50	"The Law of Ueki vs Hanon" "Law of Ueki VS Anon"; Transliteration: "Ueki vs Anon no Hōsoku" (Japanese: 植木VSアノンの法則)	March 20, 2006
As the final battle between Ueki and Hanon gets underway, Ueki transfers the energy from his Raika to his Seiku in order to match Hanon's speed. Hanon and Ueki each summon their Archenemy, which is a manifestation of their dreams with its power increased based on willpower. However, Hanon reveals that Archenemy can be summoned only six times. Hanon only has one summon since Robert used it twice already, while Ueko still have two summons. Mori calls out to Ueko just as he feels defeated, giving Ueki the willpower to protect his friends. Ueki's Archenemy finally overpowers and defeats Hanon's Archenemy. As a reward, Hanon spits out Robert. Because he previously devoured Robert, Hanon was limited by how many talents at his disposal until now, which is not the case for Ueki, who technically is not fighting a competitor of the tournament. With eighteen talents left, Ueki only has eighteen chances to take out Hanon.
51	"The Law of the Talent of Blank" "Law of Blank Zai"; Transliteration: "Kūhaku no Zai no Hōsoku" (Japanese: 空白の才の法則)	March 27, 2006
In the midst of the final battle, Ueki is only able to barely hit but not gravely hurt Hanon with his sacred weapons. Mori, Sano and Rinko join in the attack to help Ueki, who is down to his last two talents. Ueki uses his Kurogane to throw Hanon off balance before using his last Archenemy to finish the job. Suddenly, Ueki and Hanon disappear through a cloud of smoke. Hideyoshi and Barrow show up when Mori, Sano and Rinko mourn for Ueki. However, Hideyoshi appears knocked out since he took a direct hit from Ueki's Kurogane. This revives Ueki since this allowed him to gain a talent. As the winner of the tournament, Ueki gets the Talent of Blank. Rinko dates and dumps Robert, Sano goes in search of hot springs worldwide and Hideyoshi takes off never knowing that he saved Ueki. Wanko is elected as the next King of the Celestial World by Team Ueki as a whole. Ueki and Mori get back to their old life, and Ueki appears to be regaining his lost talents. Mr. K returns to being a teacher at the school since the Talent of Blank allowed Ueki to reunite with him.
