= List of The Law of Ueki characters =

The following is a list of characters from the anime and manga series, The Law of Ueki.

== Main characters ==
=== Kosuke Ueki ===
Voiced by: Romi Park (Japanese); Cole Howard (English)

- Romanized as "Kousuke Ueki" in the Animax version

Kosuke Ueki (植木 耕助, Ueki Kōsuke) is the main protagonist of the series. He's a student in Class 1-C at Hinokuni Junior High School. Ueki's ability is to change trash into trees which was given to him by his god candidate, Kobayashi (a.k.a. "Mr. K"), who is also Ueki's homeroom teacher. His Level 2 power allows him to nullify an opponent's attack by returning it back to its original form. Later in the story, Ueki's revealed to a Celestial sent to Earth by his father in order to take part in this tournament, granting him access to the Sacred Weapons. Due to his power, he can use more than one Sacred Weapon at the same time.

He's most defining personality trait is his sense of justice (a recurring theme throughout the series); he detests seeing people being oppressed, abused, or manipulated by others. Also, despite being unusually calm and caring little about what happens to himself (often snoozing in class, letting children use him as a target practice as well as a surfboard, and nonchalantly calling the police when faced with a gang of rowdy teenagers), Ueki's a genuinely kind person who's always trying to help people. In fact, his caring personality also extends to the environment (as he's often seen planting trees and picking up trash around the town park) and his enemies (such as when he saved Robert Haydn from falling debris). According to a short profile of the main characters of "The Law of Ueki" (published in the end of manga vol. 16 by the author), Ueki's hobbies include cleaning up his town.

Throughout the series, Ueki's main goal is to win the tournament and keep the Talent of Blank from falling into the hands of those who'd abuse it. Later, he also sets another goal to rescue god candidates (such as Mr. K, Inumaru and Nero) who're unjustly sent to Hell. At the end of the series, Ueki ultimately wins the tournament and the Talent of Blank. This is because he was judged as the strongest Celestial and Power User, having advanced the most in terms of growth.

The sequel "The Law of Ueki Plus" hints that he might in fact have feelings for Mori, as he states himself that if his memories of the most important person to him were to be erased, it most likely would be Mori he would end up forgetting.

=== Ai Mori ===
Voiced by: Tomoko Kawakami (Japanese); Lori Barnes-Smith (English)

Ai Mori (森 あい, Mori Ai) is Kosuke Ueki's girlfriend at Hinokuni Junior High School. When in a relaxed mood, Ai is usually upbeat and friendly, although she is often shown with a very shallow side, initially believing that all Power Users but Ueki were dangerous enemies that can't be trusted. Still, Ai cares deeply for her friends, especially Ueki. She is strict with him at times, especially when he looks like he is about to do something rash. Ai continuously tries to be his voice of reason, although her shallow antics and outspoken personality often annoys him.

She claims him to be her best friend, but it seems she may have a crush on him as she often blushes when she sees him, but it's not made abundantly clear within the series. She has hypermetropia and always carries reading glasses over her forehead. There is a gag within the series where, whenever Mori cooks food it ends up looking incredibly odd and off-putting (usually with squirming octopus tentacles), but in actually tastes really good.

Mori discovers Ueki's power early on, but comes to the rather odd conclusion that he's an alien. Upon learning of the competition Ueki is in, she decides to back him up so that he won't lose all his talents and disappear. Later on in the story, she winds up getting an ability of her own by the god candidate Inumaru during Ueki's fight with Sano. Once this power is activated, her opponent falls totally in love with glasses (usually Ai's) and will do anything to keep them from harm, such as not harming Ai out of fear they'll break the glasses or following her orders to defeat themselves. However, in order to use her power, Mori's opponent must perform a cutesy burikko pose (i.e. raising the right leg backwards while putting both of the fists close to their mouth).

=== Seiichiro Sano ===
Voiced by: Soichiro Hoshi (Japanese); Beau Thompson (English)

Seiichiro Sano (佐野 清一郎, Sano Seiichirō), a 9th Grader at Inaho Junior High School, whose power allows him to change towels into iron by holding his breath and is highly competent and creative with his power, able to create makeshift shields, springboards, and even boomerangs, which he calls "Boomerang Cutter". Sano is a formidable opponent with a high aptitude for combat and is often considered a genius by others, being very cunning and working extremely well with others to create powerful combination attacks. His level 2 enables him to add magnetic properties to his iron towels to repel or attract metal objects, which he utilizes to great effect throughout the series.

Sano at one point joins the Robert's Ten for unknown reasons, prompting Ueki to confront him in battle. It's later revealed that the leader of the Robert's Ten, Carpaccio had placed a Death Pentagon Insect onto Sano's King Candidate, Inumaru, that would remove all of the blood from his body and kill him instantly should Sano disobey him.

Sano has a burn over his left eye which was caused during an accident in a hot spring. Despite that, he loves hot springs and hopes to win the Talent of Blank to obtain the talent to discover where he can find the greatest hot spring in the world for everyone to relax and enjoy.

=== Rinko Jerrard ===
Voiced by: Mamiko Noto (Japanese); Angie Beers (English)

Rinko Jerrard (鈴子･ジェラード, Rinko Jerādo) comes from a rich family, and has many people around her who pretend to be her friend, purely to take advantage of her financially. This causes Rinko to become disillusioned with the apparent cold-heartedness of the world as well as making her vulnerable to Robert's hypnotic charisma, leading her to join Robert's Ten. Initially, Rinko has a crush on Robert since he was the first person to treat her as a real friend, but eventually comes to see Robert for what he really is and joins up with Ueki, indeed becoming his guardian and constant caretaker. She is seen teaming up with Sano in various episodes.

She loves all animals, taking an immediate liking to Tenko (whom she calls "Tenko-chan"), but her weakness for cute things makes her vulnerable to Ban's power (which just so happens to give things cute faces). It's wise not to insult her no matter what, for she has an evil alternate personality that violently attacks the person who insults her. She doesn't seem to realize that she has this evil side and forgets whatever her evil side says or does.

Rinko has the power to change beads into bombs and creates special accessories in order to use her beads in more constructive ways such as: "Rinko Rocket", a pair of shoes made of a special alloy and filled with beads that Rinko can use to blast herself up into the air for more advantageous attacks; "Beads Cannon", metallic tubes filled with beads that go over her fingers that she uses by detonating one bead in order to send the rest flying at her opponents; and "Explosive Glove", a special glove with beads hidden inside that (according to Rinko) allows her to produce a force as strong as a missile.

Rinko's Celestial god candidate is a man named Nike, one of Margarette's followers whom she hasn't seen since the battle began.

=== Hideyoshi Soya ===
Voiced by: Kappei Yamaguchi (Japanese); Chris Ippolito (English)

Hideyoshi Soya (宗屋 ヒデヨシ, Sōya Hideyoshi) has the ability to turn voices into portraits which produce sound, but only if he bends either his fingers or toes. Being prone to deception, Soya uses various novelty gags and tricks in a fight, such as soy sauce bombs. Although sometimes cowardly and weak, when Soya performs his sneak attacks in conjunction with his power, he can be a formidable opponent. During one fight, he put his portraits on Sano's towels, then turned them back to voices in order to launch a sonic attack on Team Marilyn. In addition, he can use his ability on the voices of his opponents, making it easier to deceive them.

He first appears as a Power User that Ueki and Mori try to recruit as a fifth member for their team. He looks out for a group of kids at a place called the "House of the Sun". His first King Candidate, Nero, was a kind-hearted Celestial that didn't actually want to become the King of the Celestial World; instead, he simply wanted to help out humans, which he did at the House of the Sun. Hideyoshi offered to become his Power User so that Nero could stay on Earth longer. Unfortunately, Nero ended up helping Soya during a fight and was sent to Hell as punishment. Soya then received a new King Candidate, Zack, whom he hates for being jerk and wanting him to join forces with a bunch of nasty Power Users. He agrees to help Ueki when he hears they can save Nero.

At the end of the series, Ai refers to him as the useless member of Team Ueki while also being the secret savior because he accidentally gave Ueki one last talent to save him from disappearing.

=== Kobayashi ===
Voiced by: Katsuji Mori (Japanese); Ben Jeffery (English)

Kobayashi (小林, Kobayashi), nicknamed as Mr. K (Kobasen in the Japanese versions), is a teacher at Hinokuni Junior High School. Mr. K is a king candidate who gives Ueki his power. He is Ueki's homeroom teacher and had been carefully studying him in order to judge his worth for the tournament.

Kobayashi is usually a laid-back, forgetful, and friendly man, although he can be quite serious, depending on the situation. He has a very strong sense of justice, actually inspiring Ueki long ago when he saved him from falling off a building, and acts as both his mentor and role model.

He is sent to Hell for saving (and thus helping) Ueki in his first fight against Robert Haydn. He then becomes Mori's king candidate, and returns to his old life due to Ueki winning the Talent of Blank and choosing the Talent to Reunite.

=== Inumaru ===
Voiced by: Akira Ishida (Japanese); Scott Roberts (English)

Inumaru (犬丸, Inumaru) is the king candidate who gave Sano his powers. The two officially pair up for the tournament when Sano risks his life to save a child from a burning building, and Inumaru does likewise despite Sano's threats. Inumaru's credo is that he can not ignore people in danger regardless of the reason, which prompts Sano to join, and to think of Inumaru as his friend rather than his Candidate.

After being told that Sano joined the Robert's Ten to save him from the Death Pentagon (a small black bug that Carpaccio attaches to Wanko's neck, that would suck all of Wanko's blood out of him on command, thus killing him), he contrives to destroy himself, so that Sano can be freed from his obligation. He gives Mori his power, thus breaking the most important rule of the tournament, in order to force himself to go to Hell so that the others would be saved. He was chosen as the King of the Celestial World at the end of the series.

=== Tenko ===
Voiced by: Chiwa Saitō (Japanese); Mariette Sluyter (English) (small) and Voiced by: Takashi Nagasako (Japanese); Jonathan Love (English) (big)

Tenko (テンコ, Tenko) is a large tailless yellow fox-like creature with duiker-like horns on his head, ten blue beady eyes (with the main pair three to six times larger than the other pairs), black bat-like wings, brown stripes on his limbs and with no visible ears that helps Ueki awaken his celestial powers. He can also change his shape to fit onto Ueki's wrist like an arm protector to give him advice, and seems to be able to communicate with Ueki telepathically.

He is a celestial beast who is something of a mutation among his kind (he is born as an ancient version of a celestial beast, which is a ferocious-looking Godzilla-sized creature instead of an adorable cat-sized genetically-engineered house pet). Because of this he was treated very poorly by celestials and condemned for a crime he did not commit, but Ueki is the first to actually treat him with some kindness and respect. Fairly harsh with Ueki at times, he is nevertheless happy to have found someone who actually needs him. He also is very useful at giving advice in a fight.

He is able to detect the power level of celestials (his eyes lights up and changes color to red depending on which level the celestial is on) and because of his mutations has a bigger version of what is called the "awakening organ" that can awaken the hidden powers within Ueki. Unfortunately, he can only use it to train celestials up to 7 levels without dying for every celestial. He also has an ability to spit out a large, roundish bunny creature that envelops Ueki and heals him within 12 hours.

=== Hanon ===
Voiced by: Jun Fukuyama (Japanese); Sean Broadhurst (English)

Hanon (アノン, Hanon) (Anon in the Japanese version) is a main antagonist that first appears in the middle of the anime series. He is from a race known as the Infernals (Hellions in the Japanese version), from the Protector clan. Hanon can swallow and absorb people within himself, thus making their bodies his, as well as gaining whatever abilities they have such as Robert's power and his Sacred Weapons.

With a surprisingly humble nature, he has a hard time understanding humans and tends to experiment on them with reckless curiosity. He first told Ueki that his dream is to destroy everything, but in fact, his real dream is to have someone who can defeat him.

In his first appearance he swallows Robert and steals his powers and appearance, taking his place in the tournament with the supposed intention of advancing the Infernals' goals. Later in the series, he swallows the King of the Celestial World and changes the rules of round four, declaring that his true goal is to destroy everything. He is Kosuke Ueki's final opponent in the series.

=== Robert Haydn ===
Voiced by: Mitsuki Saiga (Japanese); Sean Broadhurst (English)

Robert Haydn (ロベルト・ハイドン, Roberuto Haidon) is the main antagonist for the first half of the series, and is considered by many to be the strongest power user in the tournament due to his power to turn ideals into reality. Like Ueki he is a celestial, but it was not revealed until after Ueki discovered he was one himself.

His power to turn ideals into reality can do anything from making his sacred weapons invincible to creating bubbles that control gravity. His ideal sacred weapons have different properties: His Kurogane always hits the target, his Hood can block any attack, his Mash moves as a two dimensional face along the surface of the ground, and his Pick is a giant drill. However, such a power comes at a price: Each time he uses this power, he sacrifices one year of his lifespan. His Level 2 power is the ability to change the gravity of whatever his ideal objects touch, making them lighter or heavier.

He is extremely ruthless and cold, with a deep hatred for humanity. His goal for winning the tournament is to wipe out all of existence. This is due to his unfortunate past in which he was treated as a monster by the people of his town, due to his celestial powers. His only friends were his caretaker and fellow children at the orphanage, who eventually framed him for a theft they committed. After being betrayed by the only people he loved and trusted, he destroyed his hometown with his sacred weapon and grew to hate humanity.

After his second battle with Ueki, Robert began to doubt his ways thanks to Ueki's strong sense of justice, thereby forcing his god candidate Margarette to feed him to Hanon, who proceeded to carry out Robert's initial plan using Robert's body as a vessel. At the end of the series Hanon spits out Robert, who accepts Ueki's friendship and discards his goal of world destruction.

=== Margarette ===
Voiced by: Shūichi Ikeda (Japanese); Jonathan Love (English)

Margarette (マーガレット, Māgaretto) is Robert's father and the king candidate who gives him his power. Margarette sends his own son to Earth as a child so that he could choose him for the tournament. He is not above sneaky tactics to ensure his son's victory.

Later, he is devoured by an Infernal who steals his appearance with the intention of taking over Heaven. In this new form, he puts Ueki in his awakening organ (It turns out that his clan had eaten a lot of ancient celestial beasts), and advances Ueki to his 9 and 10 star sacred weapons.

== Robert's Ten ==
Robert's Ten are group of power users who fight on behalf of Robert Haydn. Robert created his group due to the nature of his power sacrificing a year of his life whenever he uses it. With the exception of Don, each member is stated to have well over 400 talents.

=== Kageo Kuroki ===
Voiced by: Yusei Oda (Japanese); Jeffrey Watson (English)

Kageo Kuroki (黒木 影男, Kuroki Kageo), nicknamed Kurokage, is the first member of Robert's Ten that Ueki fought against. Kageo has the power to turn shadows into clones of himself made out of clay. Not only can he generate dozens of these "Clay Men" at once, but he can also change their appearance to confuse his enemies and make it harder for them to find him. However, his favorite technique is to create a giant clay man easily capable of crushing people. One weakness of this ability is that if the sun disappears so does his power. Kageo was once the captain of his school's basketball team until he beat all the players on an opposing team who're assaulting his friends after they beat them in a game, leading to an unfair ruling which resulted in his team getting disqualified. Because of this incident, his team ended up turning their backs on him, resulting in Kageo becoming an unemotional person and eventually joining the ranks of Robert's Ten. Ueki luckily manages to get through to him with the help of Kageo's little brother and he began to play fair. However, because of this, Black Shadow is knocked out by White Shadow as punishment.

=== Kamui Rosso ===
Voiced by: Harumi Sakurai (Japanese); Annika Odegard (English)

Kamui Rosso (カムイロッソ, Kamui Rosso), nicknamed Shirokage, is a member of Robert's Ten. He has the ability to change his shadow into a robot. He has little respect for anyone and has no qualms taking out Kageo for trying to fight fairly. He was swiftly defeated by Ueki, having avenged Kageo. Taking advantage of the two vacancies, Ueki fills his position in Robert's Ten in order to defeat them one by one.

=== Alessio Juliano ===
Voiced by: Ken Narita (Japanese); Charles Heffernan (English)

Alessio Juliano (アレッシオ・ジュリアーノ, Aresshio Juriāno) is a flamboyant member of Robert's Ten. His power enables him to turn dirt into scythes. He's very loyal to Robert and will not stand for just anyone to join the group. He also shown to be a very short-tempered individual whom Ueki cannot help but irritate. Robert appoints him to oversee Ueki's training, enabling him the perfect opportunity to battle him. He was eventually beaten by Ueki with the assistance of Tenko. Despite his utmost devotion, Robert cared little about his loss, having considered Alessio to be one of the weaker members of his entourage.

=== Don ===
Voiced by: Kōji Ishii (Japanese); Ben Jeffery (English)

Don (ドン, Don) is a prideful member of Robert's Ten. His power allows him to turn rings into rockets which, combined with his brute strength, allows him to launch devastating punches. Don is very proud of his strength and always has a huge grin on his face, though he also has a very large mean streak to him. Don is easily pleased and flattered when somebody says he's strong, and likes to show off at certain times. Don is the only member of Robert's Ten who's talents do not exceed triple digits. However, all of them involve utilizing his physical strength.

=== Marco Maldini ===
Voiced by: Shō Hayami (Japanese); Randy Brososky (English)

Marco Maldini (マルコ・マルディーニ, Maruko Marudīni) is a member of Robert's Ten. His power enables him to change tomatoes into magma which proved difficult for Ueki to counter as it simply burned through his trees. An expert chef who's in charge of cooking for Robert's Ten, he gets very angry whenever someone insults his cooking, such as when Ueki dumped the soup he'd made on Alessio's head. Marco is one of the members who believes that obtaining victory is all that really matters, nearly killing former teammates Don and Alessio with his magma as well as threatening Rinko when she defects.

=== Ogre ===
Voiced by: Chikao Ōtsuka (Japanese); Richard Lee (English)

Ogre (鬼, Oni) is a member of Robert's Ten. He has the power to change bamboo swords into giant scissors. He's wears an all black outfit with horns and a forehead protector which is actually a form of chain mail. He doesn't say much but is capable of defeating most opponents incredibly fast, such as when he quickly dispatched Kagura (who had the power to change leaves into blades) without Ueki noticing until it the fight was already over.

=== Becky Wolf ===
Voiced by: Yumiko Kobayashi (Japanese); Suzette Mattar (English)

Becky Wolf (ベッキー・ウルフ, Bekkī Urufu) is a member of Robert's Ten who dresses like a cowgirl. She is very short, causing her to be mistaken for a child, much to her dismay. Her power is to change BB bullets into meteorites capable of breaking through Tenko's barrier.

=== Taro Myojin ===
Voiced by: Mayumi Yamaguchi (Japanese); Ben Johnson (English)

Taro Myojin (明神 太郎, Myōjin Tarō) is a member of Robert's Ten who recruited Ueki to join. Unlike the other participants in the battle, Taro had two powers given to him by two different King Candidates, who both wanted the position of King of the Celestial World and made a deal to rule together. Taro's abilities were to turn his whistle into a laser and CD's into buzzsaws. These were often used in conjunction, such as during his battle with Ueki, Taro would use the buzzsaws to make his opponent jump and leave themselves wide open to his laser.

=== Carl P. Accio ===
Voiced by: Wataru Takagi (Japanese); Roger Rhodes (English)

Carl P. Accio (カール・P・アッシオ, Kāru P Asshio), nicknamed Carpaccio, is a womanizing member of Robert's Ten who acts as Robert's second-in-command. He has the power to copy other people's abilities, but he must spend 24 hours within 10 meters of them. He used this to acquire the powers of all of the other members of Robert's Ten. He also has two powers from outside the group which are the power to change the opponent's thoughts into a cell phone text message and the power to change his current position with that of his opponent's. Carpaccio is very cruel and isn't above underhanded tactics to get what he or Robert wants, such as threatening to kill Inumaru.

=== Yunpao ===
Voiced by: Akiko Yajima (Japanese); Caitlynne Medrek (English)

Yunpao (ユンパオ, Yunpao) is a member of Robert's Ten. A rotund youth with a love for sweets, Yunpao has the power to change electricity into sugar whenever he opens his eyes very wide, he is a replacement member of Robert's Ten. Utilizing a large battery on his back as well as special gloves, Yunpao can shoot electricity at his opponents, but due to how easy it is for his opponents to dodge his attacks, he instead fires electricity into the air before turning it into sugar and back again once it covers them, making for a devastating attack. Also, Yunpao uses strange acrobatic poses in order to distract his enemies from his large eyes.

=== Kabara ===
Voiced by: Noriaki Sugiyama (Japanese); Jordan Schartner (English)

Kabara (カバラ, Kabara) is a member of Robert's Ten. A hunter with the power to change his cape into a pair of wings, he was the other replacement member after Ueki. He can also shoot out the feathers on his wings as he turns them into wing shuriken. Due to his experience as a hunter, Kabara is able to shoot pachinko balls with as much power as a rifle bullet. In the manga, he throws kunai instead. Kabara fits with most of the Robert's Ten because of his cold-hearted nature, having no qualms about letting Ai suffocate during the Cossack Dance Battle and believing friendship to be a weakness. He is also very fond of showing off his marksmanship skills, even to the point where he will shoot any target in front of him. Due to wearing an exploding Cossack's hat during his battle with Ai, Kabara is bald the second time he appears and, following his battle with Rinko in the Cat and Mouse Battle, he winds up developing an intense fear of cats.

== Tournament Teams ==
There are five teams that made it to the final round of the tournament to choose the next King of the Celestial World. Other than Ueki's team, there is Team Capucho, Team Grano, Team Marilyn and Team Barrow. There's also Hanon (disguised as Robert) and Li Ho who're counted as one team each due to their incredible power.

=== Team Capucho ===
==== Capucho ====
Voiced by: Yu Asakawa (Japanese); Annika Odegard (English)

The leader of Team Capucho, he's capable of changing his voice into a cryogenic mist while his level 2 Power enables him to generate a red gas that causes anything it makes contact with to become fragile. He wanted Hideyoshi to join his group so that he can use his own power to send his freezing voice from multiple directions. He is a very impatient guy and often repeats certain words and phrases. His name is also transcribed as "Kapucho" and "Caption".

==== Mario ====
Voiced by: Hiroshi Kamiya (Japanese); Paul Hudson (English)

Mario has the power to change his body into a giant billiard ball. He likes to give his attacks English names that sound absolutely absurd, such as calling his billiard attack "Super Dynamic Elegant Ball". This is because the anime states that English is his best subject.

==== Ugo ====
Voiced by: Kōki Miyata (Japanese); Ethan Cole (English)

Ugo can change rubber balls into acid. He is quite gullible and constantly falls for Soya's tricks, even though he claims he won't be fooled. Soya defeats him by stuffing nattō soybeans down his shirt and squirting wasabi sauce up his nose.

==== Nico ====
Voiced by: Masaya Matsukaze (Japanese); Jordan Schartner (English)

Nico can change his hair into a drill, he likes to attack from below his opponents to catch them by surprise. He is very vain, especially when it comes to his hair, and also tends to use the word "beautiful" in his sentences. He looks more like a beautiful girl rather than a boy and has a tendency to wear girlish clothes.

==== Zack ====
Voiced by: Osamu Ichikawa (Japanese); James D. Hopkins (English)

Soya's current King Candidate who is actually a malicious individual who wants Soya to join his newly formed group to win the tournament.

=== Team Grano ===
==== Grano ====
Voiced by: Isshin Chiba

He is the leader of Team Grano. He has the ability to turn any toy model (even a broken one) into a real-life working version while his level 2 power is to control whatever he makes come to life. The condition for this power is that he has to believe whatever he is doing is right. He claims this is easy, because as far as he is concerned, anyone who stands in his way is evil. In the manga, his condition for the power is playing with the toy first.

He loves toy models and is knowledgeable about toys. He tends to put up a nice guy front, but is actually quite mean.

==== Pecol ====
Voiced by: Yui Horie (Japanese); Jordan Henkleman (English)

He is a very timid individual and has the ability to change photos into toy models. When teamed with Pecol, Grano is unstoppable because he has an endless supply of models to use.

Pecol once saw his friend getting beaten up, but did nothing to help him because he was too afraid. He longs to be strong, but ends up being duped by Grano. He is later inspired by Ueki to follow his own path towards finding strength.

==== Guitar ====
Voiced by: Kentaro Ito (Japanese); Lucas Gilbertson (English)

He is able to turn his clothing into a barrier while his level 2 power is to create a shockwave within the barrier he makes on his opponent, but he cannot use his ability on more than one person at a time. When he was first introduced, he lied about his power, saying he was born invulnerable and that he could change sounds into shockwaves, but that was just to scare his enemies.

He loves music, particularly karaoke, but isn't very good at it. He has a tendency to use the word "baby".

==== Mūnin ====
Voiced by: Toshio Furukawa (Japanese); Ryan Stockert (English)

He enjoys traditional poetry and tends to talk in a haiku pattern. He has the power to change bad puns into reality when his opponents laughs. He is also able to turn his power on himself to attack his enemies. He is seen wearing a ratty scarecrow-style hat.

==== Pastello ====
Voiced by: Toshiharu Sakurai (Japanese); Brett Bauer (English)

Pastello likes painting and expresses himself through colors like "lucky purple" and "happy pink". He can change his line drawings into portals and (using his large brush) he can tickle the opponent through the portal, thus making them laugh and vulnerable to Mūnin's pun-based attacks.

=== Team Marilyn ===
==== Marilyn Carrey ====
Maririn Kyarī (マリリン･キャリー) Voiced by: Satsuki Yukino (Japanese); Carol-Anne Day (English)

Marilyn has the ability to stretch one second into ten, making it look as though she's superhumanly fast. Her Level 2 power allows her to double her attack power for 10 minutes (shown by a gauge which appears on her neck) after which she collapses.

Marilyn, along with the rest of her team, grew up in a war zone in an unnamed country, so they spent their lives in training. Once the war was over, her family joined the upper class. She claims to be proud of her upbringing and only feel truly alive when she is fighting, but this is a façade. She holds onto a childhood promise to her dead war buddies that forces her to keep fighting, despite her actual distaste for the act.

==== Memory ====
Memorī (メモリー) Voiced by: Minori Chihara (Japanese); Morgan Partridge (English)

Memory has the power to change blueprints into completed objects. She uses her power with Putting's to make a combination attack. This, however, was taken out temporarily by Hideyoshi blocking her sketch pad with one of his portraits, and the loss of Putting. In her fight with Ai, Memory is forced to fall back on hand-to-hand combat. She is the first victim of Mori's power. A very competent field leader who acts as a spotter from higher ground. She is also the smartest and the strictest of the team.

==== Matthew ====
Mashū (マシュー) Voiced by: Shinichiro Miki (Japanese); Ryan Stockert (English)

His power is the ability to change his two arms into six arms. When used with his military weapons, he can hold either six guns or two guns and two bazookas. Matthew is something of a flirt when it comes to ladies and thought Sano's dream was pointless if it didn't include women. Like all the members of Team Marilyn, he just wants to see Marilyn smile. He wears an eyepatch.

==== Baron ====
Baron (バロン) Voiced by: Banjou Ginga (Japanese); Adam Hunter (English)

Baron is a knife user. He has the ability to move to wherever his knife is when he throws it. His Level 2 power allows him to immobilize himself and any opponent within one meter of where he reappears.

An honest and naïve fellow who always refers to himself in the third person (at least in the Japanese version, in the English dub it's toned down). Like all the other members of his team, Baron is very loyal to Marilyn.

==== Putting ====
Putingu (プテｨング) Voiced by: Kaori Fukuhara (Japanese); Ian Wolach (English)

Putting's power is to change his mouth into a dimensional portal. He uses his power with Memory's to transport materials above the enemy, while she uses her power to change them into traps. He also uses his portal to hold smaller weapons such as grenades.

=== Team Barrow ===
==== Barrow Escarotte ====
Barou Esharotto (バロウ･エシャロット) Voiced by: Shihou Kawaragi (Japanese); Chris Lorincz (English)

The leader of Team Barrow, which consists entirely of Celestials. He has the ability to change images from past into current reality and he uses this power in conjunction with his sacred weapons to create endless attacks. He is largely concerned with achieving his goals, throwing aside anything that gets in the way of said objective. Notably, he cannot use any sacred weapons other than Kurogane, Mash, and Gulliver with his power, as all the others are attached to the body. Using his power with them would recreate his past selves, and defeating one of his past selves would defeat him.

He has a very sad past because he accidentally used Kurogane on his adoptive mother when he mistakes her as a burglar breaking into their home. She fell into a coma for several years and wakes up terrified when he actually does use his Kurogane on several burglars. At that point, he ran out of their house thinking that he is a monster and joined Robert along with the rest of the team.

==== Ban Dicoot ====
Ban Dikūto (バン･ディクート) Voiced by: Eiji Takemoto (Japanese); John Knight (English)

Ban has the ability to change inanimate objects into living beings, usually with adorable faces attached to them. Like his teammates he is a celestial and uses his power to make his sacred weapons sentient. Likes to use the phrase To the max a lot, and is impulsive and aggressive in contrast to his more reserved teammates. He sports a green ducktail hairdo. Like Rinko, he adores all things cute (however tries to act tough to hide it from his enemies), but he is the first person to fall victim to Rinko's "evil" side for calling her an insect and a small fry.

==== Diegostar ====
Diegosutā (デｨエゴスター) Voiced by: Toru Ohkawa (Japanese); Corby Proctor (English)

A very tall bald man with the ability to turn all things invisible. Like his teammates he is a celestial and uses his power to make his sacred weapons undetectable. He is prone to talks of manliness and wisdom.

==== Kill Norton ====
Kiru Nōton (キル･ノートン) Voiced by: Susumu Chiba (Japanese); Charles Hefferman (English)

Like his teammates he is a celestial, but his power was not revealed during the series. Kill Norton has an I.Q. of 179, but strangely, even though he has a high I.Q., he is constantly outsmarted by Ai, implying he's not street smart or very gullible. He named his glasses Bianca after falling in love with them during his fight with Ai. Ai suspects he is a pervert, but he denies these claims.

== Celestials and King Candidates ==
Celestials dwell in heaven and are ruled by the King of the Celestial World. Each of them are innately capable of awakening up to ten abilities called sacred weapons, beginning with the 1 star and ending with the 10 star weapon:

Kurogane (1 star): Generates a cannon that fires an enormous sphere. The first sacred weapon that all celestials automatically acquire from the beginning, and thus the most commonly used.

Hood (Fudo in the Japanese version) (2 star): Generates an arm with a shield as defense.

Ranma (3 star): Generates a large blade.

Mash (Masshu in the Japanese version) (4 star): Generates a box-like set of jaws that chomp on the enemy.

Pick (5 star): Elongates a square column towards the enemy.

Raika (6 star): Generates skate-like shoes that grant the user super speed.

Gulliver (Galiper in the Japanese version) (7 star): Summons a box from a grid on the ground to entrap the opponent.

Namihana (8 star): Generates a large whip.

Seiku (9 star): Sprouts wings from the user's back.

Archenemy (Mao/Satan in the Japanese version) (10 star): The last and most powerful sacred weapon, which few celestials have ever attained. Its exact form varies between individuals, being a manifestation of the user's dreams, its power increasing based on its user's willpower.

=== The King of the Celestial World ===
Kami-sama (神様) Voiced by: Jūrōta Kosugi (Japanese); Roger Rhodes (English)

The King of the Celestial World (God in the original Japanese version) is the one who set up the whole tournament. As shown in the anime, the King of the Celestial World is a pervert who likes women and drinking. In a flashback he was inspired to start the tournament due to the actions of Ueki's adoptive mother, Haruko Ueki, who at the time was a high school student just before she was deceased.

He established the tournament to grant both humans and Celestials the chance to shape their own futures. Despite his outward laziness and eccentric behavior, he is a powerful and perceptive ruler.

Although he was pierced by Hanon's Ranma and swallowed by him, he survived and managed to restore some of the years to Robert's life that Hanon had used up.

=== Yodogawa ===
Yodogawa (淀川) Voiced by: Katsumi Toriumi (Japanese); Brendan Hunter (English)

Yodogawa, nicknamed Yo-chan replaces Kobayashi as Ueki's king candidate. Yo-chan had a deal with another more promising king candidate, Margarette, to get Ueki to lose as soon as possible in order to take a cushy job as his assistant advisor.

He does his best to persuade Ueki to quit the tournament, but never succeeds. He rejoins to help Ueki later and apologizes for his previous behavior when Ueki is forming his team. He is at least a level 6 celestial, since in one episode, he used Raika to transport the rest of Team Ueki. For the rest of the series, he is seen either helping Team Ueki or ingratiating himself with Kobayashi and Inumaru.

=== Pag ===
Voiced by: Kouji Tsujitani (Japanese); Paul Cowling (English)

A celestial who sent his son, Kosuke Ueki, to Earth as a baby with the same selfish intents as Margarette: to choose his son for the tournament so that he himself could benefit. Unfortunately for him, he was not chosen as a king candidate like Margarette was.

He does however seem to express regret when he meets up with Ueki and company later, not revealing his true identity to Ueki due to his shame. Pag also teaches Ueki a way to advance to his level 2 power stating that it would be "the first and last time" he would aid Ueki.

=== Lafferty ===
Voiced by: Etsuko Kozakura (Japanese); Suzette Mattar (English)

The king candidate who gave Taira his powers. She tried to cheat during a fight by giving Taira more water and was sent to Hell for it.

=== Ganju ===
The king candidate who gave Li Ho his powers. He is also Li Ho's coach, and Li Ho wears a hat that looks like his but with different colors. Not even Ganju himself has seen Li Ho use his powers before.

== Other power users ==
=== Maruo Taira ===
Taira Maruo (平 丸男) Voiced by: Kenta Miyake (Japanese); Jonathan Love (English)

Taira has the power to change water into fire when he puts it into his mouth. He usually prefers to just blast fire, but he can manipulate it by gargling, making it an explosive fireball. He wants the talent to conquer if he wins. He was Ueki's first fight.

=== Hayao Adachi ===
Adachi Hayao (足立 駿夫) Voiced by: Motoki Takagi (Japanese); Brett Bauer (English)

His supernatural power allows him to turn cotton into stakes. Adachi wants to obtain the talent to run because he absolutely loves track but he is not a very good runner. He meets Ueki, who Adachi is envious of for his talent to run, but promises to keep running and maybe even beat him someday.

=== Li Ho ===
Ri Hō (李崩; Lǐ Bēng) Voiced by: Koyasu Takehito (Japanese); Roger Rhodes (English)

Li Ho refuses to use his power to turn his hair into a telescoping bat, in favor of using his incredible martial arts skills to defeat his enemies. Li Ho considers Ueki his rival and wants to become a strong fighter in honor of his father, who fell victim to the plague. Originally, he fights Ueki using a move he calls The Count of Monte Cristo (King of the Cave (秘鍵巌窟王, hiken gankutsuou) in the Japanese version) but succumbs to its weakness when Ueki grabs hold of his shoulders. He covers this weakness in round four by rotating his arms and shoulders, but his technique fails once again when Hanon grips onto his head to stop his movement.

During the third round, Li Ho displays a distinct growth in power, utilizing his inner power to perform powerful attacks. Channeling his power into his feet, for instance, allows him rapid movement. Li Ho has developed a defense called tai chi which is a circular strike used to repel any attack. Ueki battles him before facing Marilyn, and learns new ways to use his powers and skills in battle.

=== Junichi Baba ===
Baba Jun'ichi (馬場 淳一) Voiced by: Kisho Taniyama (Japanese); Jason Booker (English)

Junichi Baba, nicknamed B.J. can turn coins into wind. B.J. loves hip-hop music. He has a tendency to lie a lot. Particularly when fighting other power users, he lies that he is Robert Haydn to win through intimidation. His defeat at the real Robert Haydn's hands spurs Ueki to challenge him the first time.

He is a pervert especially towards Ai. During Ueki's first battle with him, he maximizes the speed of his whirlwinds to see her underwear and during their second meeting, he rubbed her body which resulted in a punch his face.

=== Bolo T. ===
Voiced by: Yasuyuki Kase (Japanese); Scott Roberts (English)

Bolo T can turn his forehead into diamond, which he uses to headbutt his opponents. He can only use this power when his hands are in his pocket, which Ueki takes advantage off by accurately tearing off his pockets. Has many talents which he uses quite skillfully in battle, such as the talents to capture, break tiles, kick rocks, corner, and sew (to repair said pockets). He often incorporates the word "jan" at the end of his sentences, which is changed to "yo" in the English dub.

=== Monjiro Oniyama ===
Oniyama Monjirō (鬼山 紋次郎)Voiced by: Katsuyuki Konishi (Japanese); Randy Brososky (English)

Monjiro Oniyama, nicknamed Onimon, has the power to change dirt into iron balls when he kicks them, and he has 299 talents. He believes in fair and square fights and has a tendency to shorten words and phrases. He loves his home village and wants the talent to build in order to build his own village back up.

He teaches Ueki some basic fighting techniques to help win the fight against Kurokage, the first person Ueki fights from the Robert's Ten.

== Ueki's family ==
=== Gengoro Ueki ===
Ueki Gengorō (植木 源五郎) Voiced by: Shigeru Chiba (Japanese); Jonathan Love (English)

Ueki's adoptive father. He is a writer and likes anything weird or unusual. Rather than being shocked or scared at peculiar things, he shouts in excitement, especially when he saw Tenko for the first time ever. He also enjoys sports very much. He often says "Reality is Stranger than Fiction!"

=== Shoko Ueki ===
Ueki Shōko (植木 翔子) Voiced by: Akira Kasahara (Japanese); Morgan Partridge (English)

Ueki's stunningly beautiful adoptive sister, she is a student in a nursing school. She is extremely protective of Ueki, as when she first hears that he has taken part in the tournament, she reacts by complaining about all the bruises and scraped knees he will get, and that she could not bear the thought of him getting hurt.

In the series, she likes to play video games, owning a myriad of games along with the PlayStation 2, a Dreamcast and a GameCube consoles. She is very enthusiastic about playing video games with Ai.

=== Haruko Ueki ===
Ueki Haruko (植木 春子) Voiced by: Megumi Hayashibara

Ueki's adoptive mother who died in a car accident the same day that Ueki arrived on Earth. She is the first person the King of the Celestial World meets while on a trip to Earth 25 years ago when he was a newly elected King of the Celestial World and she was a high school student. Her maiden surname is Ueki and she mentions that she has a boyfriend who is a writer, which is also Gengoro's occupation. Her daughter is her spitting image with the exception that Haruko wears her hair in a ponytail.

== Manga only ==
=== Fukusuke Hibiki ===
Fukusuke Hibiki appeared exclusively in the manga. He pursues Ueki, convinced that he is the fictional "tree devil" from a children's book he read.

== The Law of Ueki Plus ==
=== Nagara's Laundromat ===
==== Kosuke Ueki ====
Kosuke Ueki (植木 耕助, Ueki Kōsuke)

Job power: The ability to apply Grab (掴(ガチ), Gachi) onto a mop.

Unlike in original series, where he can transform trash into trees as well as call forth Sacred Weapons, Ueki starts this series powerless. This is because he cannot use his Sacred Weapons or he'd lose his last two talents. He follows Wool to Hangekai and with the help of Nagara he discovers a new power. When the mop is applied with this power, the mop is able to stretch as long as Ueki pleases and in whatever directions he wishes. However, this ability has one restriction: It cannot grab things Ueki cannot see. Later in the story, after training very hard with this power, Ueki can bend the mop hairs to form giant hammers to beat people with. Also, while the mop has a great attack power, it can be cut easily.

==== Wool ====
Wool (ウール, U-lu)

A sheep from Hangekai, who insists he is a dog. He has 3 forms: one where he acts quite human (he can talk and smoke) and the other where he acts like a dog (and only barks), the third form is as known as its original form where Ueki's rainbow coloured mop's pole plug-into the back of Wool and transform into a huge winged-sheep-like creature. But the original form can only be awaken by the recognized mop-holding master of Wool. While in its original form, Ueki can apply his "Grab" effect on Wool as Wool's indestructible wools can act like Ueki's mop. In human mode, his attitude is similar to a rude uncle. His fur is very defensive and can withstand almost any sort of impact. In order to restore the cube (the lost memories of important people) in his body, he must be taken to a place called "MegaSite" in Hangekai.

==== Nagara ====
Nagara (ナガラ)

Job power: The ability to apply Therapy (癒(テラピ), Terapi) on an hourglass.

A 22-year-old shopkeeper of the Nagara's Laundry Shop. He may be the shopkeeper of the shop, but he is actually very bad at operating washing-machines. He is PLUS's little brother. As a job-power user, he is somewhat strong – every team that participated in the competition always kept an eye on him and his team. In order to help Ueki and achieve his own success, he used the name of the shop to participate in the competition.

Nagara's hourglass absorbs the damage that is caused by attackers. The absorbed damage is then gradually displaced on to himself. The more damage that is absorbed, the more volume of healing therapy is stored. He is killed trying to save Ueki, Haiji and Sora after PLUS's attack but is reborn due to his unexplained ability to revive his dead cells.

==== Haiji ====
Haiji (ハイジ)

Job Power: The ability to apply Gun (撃(ガン), Gan) on a washing machine.

Age 17. He loves to fight and loves animals- Hence, every time he throws punches or attack moves, he will mention the name of that attack as he has named them after some form of animal. For example, "アカアナグマ百楼拳" ("Red Badger Hundred Floor Punches!") or "スコティッシュ29球拳" ("Scottish 29 ball Punches!"), etc. Haiji is Milee's older brother, and ever since their parents had died, they had to live together with Nagara. Haiji has somewhat of a sister complex, and is overly protective of Milee.

He can summon a 3 ton, small washing machine on his knuckle as a weapon. The Gun, when applied to the washing machine, gives it an advantage to shoot out water-element shots or beams. Haiji can fire attacks like "トルネード撃(ガン)砲(キャノン) ("Tornado Gun Cannon") or "撃(ガン)MAX ("Gun MAX"), etc.

==== Milee ====
Milee (ミリー)

Milee is Haiji's little sister. She loves animals just like her brother. Watching his brother struggling just to protect her and all the innocent little animals from bullies, she gets upset. At the same time, she is happy because although Haiji was called a bully or spoiled child, she knew that her big brother never wanted to fight back like a bully. All Haiji wanted was to protect her.

==== Sora ====
Sora (ソラ)

Job Power: The ability to apply Double (倍(ダブル), Daburu) on a hamburger.

Sora is a hamburger loving, 14-year-old teenage girl. At times, she acts silly, but she is alert and good at teamwork. She lives in the orphanage's home. Sometimes, she will come to Nagara's laundry shop and play with Milee. She has her own law on burgers: "As a good burger-lover, I should punish those other burger-lovers who illegally steal other people's burgers!"

Whenever she eats a hamburger applied with that power, everything on her doubles:

- Deka Sora (デカソラ): Doubles her size and become a tall, powerful giant.
- Bi-Sora (バイソラ): Doubles her personality, splits into two Sora's without any side effects.
- Haya-Sora (ハヤソラ): Doubles her speed, she can run twice as fast.
- Kata-Sora (カタソラ): Doubles her strength, she is twice as strong.
- Tobi-Sora (トビソラ): Doubles her jumping skills, her jumping length is doubled.
- Bi-Haya Sora (バイハヤソラ): Her secret move. Allows 2 Sora's to use increased speed at the same time. Sometimes, depending on Sora, it doesn't work well.

=== Tekurin Finance ===
==== Ginzo ====
Ginzo (ギンゾー)

Job power: the ability to apply Return (返(カエシ), Kaeshi) on Promissory Note (借用証書, Shakuyōshōsho)

He is an old, big, fat guy that wears glasses. He appears to be the boss of the finance company. He always picks on people that haven't returned the money that they borrowed by increasing the interest.

In order to use his power, he must have the foe's permission with their signature on the contract of lending as proof. Then he can borrow all the damage done by the foe on him to attack the foe without receiving any damage. And once the contract is broken, the agreement is broken and if that happens, all of the damage that he had borrowed will be returned to the owner in a blow. It's not perfect, however, as other things can take the damage if put in the attack's path.

==== Shiro ====
Shiro (シロ)

Job Power: The ability to apply Stick (貼(ペタ), Peta) on Cash (現金, Genkin)

A greedy, rich and self-centered guy who work for Ginzo. Everything he owned and bought is always expensive and attractive. He hates people that are not concerned about the attraction of money and people that ruin his appearance, especially his extremely expensive clothes.

He can summon notes as much as he wants for shopping and/or combat. He can use the notes as a lot of very strong stickers; they can be stick on other notes like super magnets. It can be deactivated as well. However, his power has a requirement; he must stay in the same place as when he activated his power, otherwise the notes will automatically deactivate themselves.

==== Akaba ====
Akaba (アカバ)

Half-Job Power: He can summon a 1-ton, heavy coffer (金庫(ゲルトシユランク), Gerutoshiyuranku). The size of the coffer is slightly smaller than Haiji's 3 ton, washing machine.

A big guy, who work for the Tekurin finance. He was given orders by Shiro to knock out Haiji. But instead of defeating Haiji, he was defeated by Haiji with his Tiger & Doria's Tree-kangaroo Punch (タイガー&ドリアキノボリカンガルー拳, Taigaa & Doriakinobori Kangarū Kobushi). He and Shiro then realize that his 1 ton, heavy coffer is no match to Haiji's 3 ton, washing machine.

=== Pitch-Black Hair Salon ===
==== Necroman ====
Necroman (ネクロマン)

Job-power: The ability to apply "Whirl"「渦(トルネ)」on "Blowdryer"「ドライヤー」

Age 28. Shopkeeper of the Pitch-Black Hair Salon. Although he is a hair-stylist, he has a weird hairstyle. When he tries to say "me" or "I" is always pronounced as "Orecchi"「オレっち」. He's quite a good guy and always care for his teammates. His attacks are varied by the flow of his wind's effect, for strong winds is called "Hurricane Blow" 「暴風(ハリケーン)ブロー」, for sudden move is called "Gust Blow" 「突風(ガスト)ブロー」and for cooling winds is called "Breeze Blow" 「そよ風(ブリーズ)ブロー」.

==== Treat ====
Treat (トリート)

Job-power: The ability to apply "Pyon (jump)" 「跳(ピョン)」on "Shampoo" 「シャンプー」

A twenty-year-old hair-washing worker. This "pyon" effect of hers has a rubber-like substance that gives the elastic effect on the shampoo. Once stepped will be sling away elastically instead of slipped and fell. It can be put into use when chasing people, jumping and fighting. She always jumps on it in order to increase her speed to chase after Ueki and his teammates, but it still must depend on the user's strength on foot. It also can be used in combat as it can sling away impacts of attacks from foes and sling herself as a human sling-shot.

==== Byaku ====
Byaku (ビャク)

Job Power: The ability to apply "Hard"「固(カチコチ)」 on "Hair Wax"「ワックス」

A 16-year-old hair-styling worker. When he uses his hair wax, his hair becomes extremely hard and can actually "punch" someone. He has a very bad attitude and he is the "Snobby Prince" of the group. He never thought of the Pitch Black Hair Salon workers as friends because he was betrayed by his former friends. Instead, he thought of them as tools. But after seeing Ueki's dedication to help friends instead of himself, he has changed his attitude.

==== Bomba ====
Bomba (ボンバ)

Job Power: The ability to apply "Intimidate"「悪(ワル)」 on a "Wig"「ヅラ」

He's a very kind guy works as a permer, he has an Afro hairstyle and wears a shirt with the word 'Cut' on it. But when he uses his powers, he wears a ducktail pompadour wig and becomes evil, turning his shirt inside out where 'Cut' turns into 'Bad'. He was still easily defeated with one punch from Haiji with his "Final Bison Fist".

=== Pamidoro Restaurant ===
==== Chef Mony ====
Chef Mony (モニシェフ)

Job Power: The ability to apply "Tight"「密(ギチ)」on "Milk"「ミルク」

The chef is a large built restaurant owner and head chef. According to the characters description he drinks milk that he applies using a technique known as "tightening" which causes all his bones to become 100% tightened. This transformation turns him into the "Strong bone chef" granting him extraordinary physical durability.

==== Vino ====
Vino (ビーノ)

Job Power: The ability to apply "Enlarge"「膨(デカ)」on "Fork"「フォーク」

A waiter who has a headphone on his head, on the second round of the competition, he uses his power to enlarge his fork and pierce the ceiling. After the fork is pierced to the ceiling, he shrunk the fork making him able to reach the ceiling and jump into the top of the Ramen Tower and successfully get the key for the next round.

==== Dolce ====
Dolce (ドルチェ)

Job Power: The ability to apply "Smoke"「煙(モーク)」on "Flour"「小麦粉」

He uses his power to create a smokescreen to make the foe difficult to see.

==== Omelette ====
Omelette (オムレット)

Job Power: The ability to apply "Bind"「縛(バク)」on "Pasta"「パスタ」

Among these 4 people, he is the smallest. His binding effect gives the pasta a 300 kilo of power to bind the opponent, it is like an unbreakable rope.

=== Happiness Enterprise ===
==== PLUS ====
Happiness Enterprise is the corporation responsible for the memory loss. The company's CEO is PLUS, Nagara's older brother, who wishes to destroy the stolen memories with the power of 'Erase' and replace them with a single memory of himself in order to make him the only important person to everyone in both worlds, thus achieving both world domination and functional godhood. Happiness has developed a suit capable of performing a variety of powers including an invisible shield. The suit was said to have 999 different powers. PLUS's job power is 'Beast' in the form of an amulet. It enables him to change into a huge monster with great strength and durability. Ueki is able to beat him only by using Wool's third form.
