= List of Ninja Hattori-kun episodes =

Ninja Hattori-kun episodes include 1966 television drama, 1981 anime and 2012 anime.

== 1966 TV drama ==
=== Season 1 ===
Season 1 official title was 'Ninja Hattori-kun'.

| Ep No | Year of release | On - Air Date | English title | Japanese Title |
|---|---|---|---|---|
| 1 | 1966 | 7-4 | Hattori is coming | ハットリくん来たる |
| 2 | 1966 | 14-4 | school disturbance | 学校騒動 |
| 3 | 1966 | 21-4 | Confrontation of Iga and Koga | 伊賀甲賀の対決 |
| 4 | 1966 | 28-4 | answering machine disturbance | 留守番騒動 |
| 5 | 1966 | 5-5 | excursion disturbance | 遠足騒動 |
| 6 | 1966 | 12-5 | cheating scandal | カンニング騒動 |
| 7 | 1966 | 19-5 | Sunday disturbance | 日曜騒動 |
| 8 | 1966 | 26-5 | dreamland riot | ドリームランド騒動 |
| 9 | 1966 | 2-6 | Ninjutsu school disturbance | 忍術学校騒動 |
| 10 | 1966 | 9-6 | movie riot | 映画騒動 |
| 11 | 1966 | 16-6 | haunted disturbance | お化け騒動 |
| 12 | 1966 | 23-6 | Tourism disturbance | 観光騒動 |
| 13 | 1966 | 30-6 | espionage | スパイ騒動 |
| 14 | 1966 | 6-7 | meal disturbance | お食事騒動 |
| 15 | 1966 | 13-7 | hard sell | 押し売り騒動 |
| 16 | 1966 | 20-7 | school festival riot | 学芸会騒動 |
| 17 | 1966 | 27-7 | car trouble | 自動車騒動 |
| 18 | 1966 | 3-8 | feigned illness | 仮病騒動 |
| 19 | 1966 | 10-8 | Rinkan school riot | 林間学校騒動 |
| 20 | 1966 | 17-8 | seppuku riot | 切腹騒動 |
| 21 | 1966 | 24-8 | Maid's uproar | お手伝いさん騒動 |
| 22 | 1966 | 31-8 | Hattori will be disappointed | ハットリくんシゴかれる |
| 23 | 1966 | 7-9 | measles outbreak | はしか騒動 |
| 24 | 1966 | 14-9 | wedding turmoil | 結婚式騒動 |
| 25 | 1966 | 21-9 | birthday riot | 誕生日騒動 |
| 26 | 1966 | 28-9 | Riot in Iga | 伊賀の騒動 |

=== Season 2 ===
Season 2 official title was 'Ninja Hattori + Ninja Monster Jippō'.

| Ep No | Year of release | On - Air Date | English title | Japanese Title |
|---|---|---|---|---|
| 1 | 1967 | 3-8 | Jippo-kun Appears | ジッポウ君あらわる |
| 2 | 1967 | 10-8 | Jippo-kun's big mistake!! | ジッポウ君大失敗!! |
| 3 | 1967 | 17-8 | strange home Degozaru | 変な家うちでござる |
| 4 | 1967 | 24-8 | Good luck Jippo | ごきげんジッポウ君 |
| 5 | 1967 | 31-8 | What is the PTA? | PTAとはなんでござる？ |
| 6 | 1967 | 7-9 | A wedding is a big deal | 結婚式とは大変なものでござる |
| 7 | 1967 | 14-9 | The cock-a-doodle is canceled Kekko Degozaru | コケコッコーは欠航ケッコーでござる |
| 8 | 1967 | 21-9 | You don't need a helper sword | 助太刀は無用でござる |
| 9 | 1967 | 28-9 | bandit Sanzoku It came out one after another | 山賊サンゾクぞくぞく出て来たでござる |
| 10 | 1967 | 5-10 | school is difficult | 学校は難しいでござる |
| 11 | 1967 | 12-10 | Jippo doesn't like baths | ジッポウはお風呂が嫌いでござる |
| 12 | 1967 | 19-10 | Mogul to Edo Castle | 江戸城へモグルでござる |
| 13 | 1967 | 26-10 | Pineapple is flat | パイナップルは真平でござる |
| 14 | 1967 | 2-11 | The famous horse of the world is as expected | 天下の名馬は流石でござる |
| 15 | 1967 | 9-11 | Pirates will appear | 海賊あらわれるでござる |
| 16 | 1967 | 16-11 | This is Yamato Damashii | これぞヤマトダマシイでござる |
| 17 | 1967 | 23-11 | It's a close call to help people | 危機一髪人助けでござる |
| 18 | 1967 | 30-11 | Jippo's illness is huge | ジッポウの病気は特大でござる |
| 19 | 1967 | 7-12 | I'm going to beat the industrial espionage | 産業スパイをやっつけるでござる |
| 20 | 1967 | 14-12 | Hattori-kun's great detective | ハットリくんの名探偵でござる |
| 21 | 1967 | 21-12 | It's a confrontation with witchcraft | 妖術との対決でござる |
| 22 | 1967 | 28-12 | It's the art of replacing souls | タマシイ入れかえの術でござる |
| 23 | 1968 | 4-1 | That's cowardly Jippo-kun | それはジッポウくん卑怯でござる |
| 24 | 1968 | 11-1 | Look at the monkey, hear the monkey, it's a monkey | 見ザル聞かザル云わザルでござる |
| 25 | 1968 | 18-1 | It's Jippo's extermination of Yurei. | ジッポウのユウレイ退治でござる |
| 26 | 1968 | 25-1 | Goodbye Jippo | ジッポウよサヨウナラでござる |

== 1981 anime ==
=== Season 1 ===
| Japanese EP# | Title | Synopsis |
|---|---|---|
| 1 | I am! Ninja (I am a Ninja) (拙者！忍者でござるの巻) | When Kenichi watches TV, Ninja Hattori enters and surprises Kenichi. Hattori does all the household work and surprises Kenichi and his family. |
| 2 | Hateful Teacher (Hattori saves Kenichi from his teacher) (おのれ憎っくき先生の巻) | Koike-Sensei gets afraid of Hattori's shadow and runs to school. He scolds Kenichi at school, but Hattori saves Kenichi. |
| 3 | The road of part-time job is tough (Let's earn some money) (アルバイトの道はきびしいでござるの巻) | Kenichi wants a model locomotive. He tries to save money by helping out at home, but Hattori finishes his errands before Kenichi. Hattori-kun is kicked out by Kenichi who gets angry, but he starts a part-time job at a soba restaurant for Kenichi. |
| 4 | I came to Shishimaru (Shishimaru Wins) (獅子丸には参ったでござるの巻) | Shishimaru (Ninja dog) helps Kenichi and Yumeko from a dog and disappears. So, Hattori catches Shishimaru and brings him home. |
| 5 | The goal is 100 points (A Perfect Score) (目標は百点でござるの巻) | Hattori makes Kenichi study hard and does not allow him to rest. As Kenichi scores good marks, Ama gifts them both. |
| 6 | Leave the food to us (Leave The Cooking To Us) (料理はまかせてくだされの巻) | Kenichi takes Hattori's help and does all the household work. Kenichi surprises his parents on their wedding anniversary with a celebration. |
| 7 | Did you see it? (Baseball Ninja Style) (見たか知ったかハットリ打法の巻) | Hattori trains Kenichi to play baseball. But as Kenichi fears to play the match, Hattori plays on his behalf. Later, Kennichi plays and wins the match. |
| 8 | Transfer student from Koga (The New Student) (甲賀からきた転校生の巻) | Amara meets Hattori and fights with him. So, Hattori decides to teach Amara a lesson, but Koike-Sensei scolds Kenichi. |
| 9 | Shinzou-kun is here now (Shinzou Arrives) (シンゾウくん只今参上の巻) | Shinzou finds Hattori and helps him get rid of Amara. Hattori introduces Shinzou to Kenichi's family. |
| 10 | Rehabilitation (Hattori Recovers His Honor) (名誉かいふくの巻) | Koike-Sensei visits Kenichi's house. Shishimaru loses his grip, falls on Koike-Sensei and knocks him unconscious. |
| 11 | Shinzou-kun is going to use (Shinzou Runs An Errand) (シンゾウくんお使いにいくの巻) | Shinzo loses his way and the list. So, Shishimaru and Hattori guide him. Shinzo tells everyone about his deed. |
| 12 | Weird customer (The Strange Visitor) (変なお客でござるの巻) | Yamamoto visits Kentaru as a schoolmate. In the night, Yamamoto robs and tries to leave but gets caught. A cop declares a reward to the family. |
| 13 | I'm not good at athletic meet (The Athletic Meet) (運動会は苦手でござるかの巻) | Kenichi takes Hattori and Shinzou's help and wins the race on sports day. |
| 14 | Mr. Kenichi is a stray cameraman (To Catch A Thief) (ケンイチ氏は迷カメラマンの巻) | Hattori and Kenichi click pictures of Kemumaki's cat while he robs the fruits and proves Kenichi innocent to the neighbour. |
| 15 | Cure laziness (Curing A Case Of Laziness) (怠け病をなおすでござるの巻) | Kenichi gets a bad dream of Kemumaki threatening him and gets afraid to go to school. On seeing the doctor, Kenichi reveals the truth and makes Kemumaki his friend. |
| 16 | What is a UFO? (The UFO) (UFOってなんでござるかの巻) | Kenichi impresses with his picture of a UFO. After returning home, Hattori tells Kenichi the truth about the UFO. |
| 17 | Ninja Sleep Paralysis Technique (The Ninja Restrainer) (忍法金縛りの巻) | Kenichi insists Hattori on teaching him the Ninja technique and misuses it. Kenichi promises Hattori to use the technique at the right time. |
| 18 | I have to study by myself (Do Your Homework!) (勉強は自分でやらねばならぬの巻) | Kenichi enjoys his day and forgets to complete his homework. Next morning, he is surprised to see his homework completed by Hattori. |
| 19 | The Kidnapping (Kenichi searches Shinzou) (シンゾウ危しの巻) | Kenichi assumes Shinzou has been kidnapped. After a lot of struggle, Hattori and Kenichi are shocked to find Shinzou with Koike-Sensei. |
| 20 | Chestnut picking uproar (Chestnut Fever) (栗ひろい騒動の巻) | Kenichi and his friends visit the cocoa garden. While plucking the fruits, they get caught by the manager, but he allows them to take fruits. |
| 21 | This is the Ninja Mansion (The Ninja Hideaway) (ここが忍者屋敷でござるの巻) | On hearing Shinzou's cry, Hattori shows the family a room that he uses to meditate at night. |
| 22 | I am! accompany you on a hike (School picnic!) (拙者！ハイキングにお供するでござるの巻) | The school takes the students for a picnic. Kemumaki provokes Hattori to fight but Hattori stays calm on Kenichi's insistence. |
| 23 | Kemumaki is pretty good too (Kemumaki can be nice too!) (ケムマキもなかなかやるでござるの巻) | Kemumaki troubles Kenichi and calls Hattori Kenichi's bodyguard. On seeing Kemumaki treat a dog with care, Kenichi, Hattori, and Shinzou are shocked. |
| 24 | Deliver lost items (Shinzou's disastrous cry!) (忘れ物を届けるでござるの巻) | Kenichi forgets his book at home. So, Hattori and Shinzou go to Kenichi's school. But Shinzou's cry makes everyone faint. |
| 25 | A Trip To Kyoto (Hide-and-seek in the bullet train) (新幹線かくれんぼの巻) | Kenichi and his friends reach Tokyo without informing their parents. After returning, Kenichi's parents have a discussion about the trip. |
| 26 | The Golden Coin (The Gold Coins) (小判がザクザクの巻) | Shishimaru and Kenichi find a gold coin, but Shinzou loses it. Later, Hattori returns the gold coin to Kenichi's parents. |
| 27 | If you slip, you pickpocket (Pickpocketing A Pick Pocket) (スラれたらスリかえすでござるの巻) | Hattori hypnotises Kentaru to find the person who has robbed Kentaru's salary. He catches the thief and returns Kentaru's money. |
| 28 | Ninja Hypnotism (Ninja Technique Of Hypnotism) (忍法あやつりニャンニャンの巻) | Kenichi uses magic tricks on his teacher. Later, Kemumaki uses magical tricks on Kenichi and makes him his pet. |
| 29 | Challenging Ninja Shadow Technique (The Ninja Steal In) (忍法もぐり影に挑戦するの巻) | Kenichi pleads to Ama to let him watch a movie, but she refuses. Kenichi helps Hattori in the household chores and is rewarded by his mother. |
| 30 | Which is better, dog or cat? (Which Is Superior, Dogs Or Cats?) (犬猫どっちがえらいかの巻) | In the race between the Kiyo and Shishimaru, Hattori saves Shishimaru from all the obstacles and helps him win it. |
| 31 | The Ninja Has to Bear (Kenichi and Yumeko's Outing) (ニンニンとたえるが忍者でござるの巻) | Kemumaki tries to stop Kenichi from going to Yumeko's place by harming Kenichi, but Hattori manages to keep him safe. |
| 32 | Shishimaru Ate A Diamond (The lost diamond) (獅子丸の食べたダイヤモンドの巻) | As Shishimaru swallows a diamond, the kids use a vacuum cleaner to remove it. They later find out that the diamond is artificial. |
| 33 | I Can Take Charge Of The House (The Unexpected Guest) (留守番はおまかせでござるの巻) | After Kenichi's parents leave, a thief enters as a guest. But Hattori and the kids teach him a lesson and get him arrested by the police. |
| 34 | Hide-And-Seek (Ninja technique of Hide-And-Seek) (かくれんぼ大作戦の巻) | Kenichi plays hide and seek with Yumeko and Kemumaki, but Kemumaki troubles Kenichi. The next day, Kenichi tricks Kemumaki. |
| 35 | Shinzou Gets Present (Shinzou goes to get a gift) (火の用心はおまかせくだされの巻) | Shinzou goes out with Shishimaru to get a gift for Kentaru on his promotion. Later, they return home with a gift and get a gift from Kentaru. |
| 36 | Shinzou's Present (Kenichi gives a gift to Yumeko) (シンちゃんのプレゼントの巻) | Shinzou changes the look of Shishimaru and gives him to Kenichi to gift Yumeko. Later, Shinzo admits that he transformed Shishimaru. |
| 37 | Be Careful Of The Cold (Precautions for Cold) (風邪に御用心の巻) | Kenichi sends Hattori to school on his behalf to know if Kemumaki gossips to Yumeko about him, but Kemumaki gets to know that Kenichi is Hattori. |
| 38 | I'm not good at frogs (Hattori hates frogs) (カエルは苦手でござるの巻) | Kentaru gets a frog made of gold. Kemumaki threatens Hattori and makes him his slave as he fears frogs. |
| 39 | Shinzou Feels Upset (Hattori causes trouble to the Shinzou) (シンゾウ先生をこまらせるの巻) | Shinzou feels bad for always losing the finger game. Hattori, Kenichi and Shishimaru go in search of Shinzo and feel happy on finding him at the end. |
| 40 | Up, Up And Away (Kenichi Flies in the Sky) (ケン一くん空をとぶの巻) | Kenichi makes a plane with Hattori's help and impresses Yumeko by flying the plane himself. |
| 41 | The Wrong Present (A Mistaken Gift) (まちがったおくりものの巻) | Kenichi opens a parcel and shares the cake with Shinzou and Shishimaru, but later realises it was the neighbour's parcel. |
| 42 | No More Drinking! (When Dad Drinks Too Much) (飲みすぎにご用心の巻) | Kentaru finds it difficult to go to work due to a hangover. Kenichi gets angry as his father never spends time with him and seeks help from Hattori to stop Kentaru from drinking. |
| 43 | The Lottery (A trip to Hawaii) (落ちてるクジに手を出すなの巻) | Kemumaki plays a prank on Kenichi by making him win a lottery. Later, they find out that they have won a lottery in reality. |
| 44 | The Haircut (Mighty wall at Barbershop) (ニンニン床屋で大騒動の巻) | Kenichi and Hattori go to a salon to get a haircut. On seeing Kemumaki coming, Kenichi becomes a hair stylist and shaves Kemumaki bald. |
| 45 | Long Legs For Kenichi (Kenichi's long legs) (足長ケンちゃんの巻) | Shinzou and Shishimaru help Kenichi to become tall by attaching artificial legs. But later realizes the outcome and refuses to grow tall. |
| 46 | The Hypnotizing Ball (The magical ball) (忍法こころがわりの巻) | Kenichi assumes a cracker to be the magical ball and uses it on his father to hypnotise him, but it reverses back at him. |
| 47 | Santa claus comes to town (Shinzou meets Santa Claus) (サンタクロース騒動の巻) | On Christmas Eve, Hattori puts gifts in Shinzou and Shishimaru's socks. They both feel very happy and also get to know that Hattori is Santa Claus. |
| 48 | The lost wedding ring (Mommy loses her ring) (とんだ餅つき大会の巻) | While preparing rice cakes, Ama loses her ring. Later, Hattori finds the ring stuck in Shishimaru's tooth. |
| 49 | The Love Letter (Kenichi's love letter) (ラブレターをとり戻せの巻) | Kenichi writes a letter to Yumeko, but Kemumaki adds a few lines and posts the letter to Yumeko. Hattori helps Kenichi find the letter with his ninja technique. |
| 50 | Go Fly A Kite (The art of kite flying) (凧上げはムササビの術でござるの巻) | Kenichi finds a remote control plane. Hattori, Shinzou and Shishimaru find out whose plane it is and pray for his good health. |
| 51 | A Dream Of Ninja Days (Kenichi sees a dream) (初夢三ッ葉城は日本晴れでござるの巻) | Kenichi sees Yumeko spending her life with Hattori, but later realizes, it was a dream and feels relieved. |
| 52 | It's Hard Being A Ninja (Ninja techniques are really hard) (忍法修業もつらいでござるの巻) | Kio comes across Shinzou and troubles by showing him some ninja techniques. As Hattori gets to know this, he decides to teach Kio a lesson. |
| 53 | Shishimaru Saves The Day (No one can beat Shishimaru's hunger) (シシ丸だぬきのはらつづみの巻) | When Yumeko and Kenichi play badminton, they break Yumeko's grandfather's favourite statue, but Hattori fixes the statue. |
| 54 | Surprise Visitor (Taking charge of home could be painful) (留守番はつらいでござるの巻) | A guest arrives at Kenichi's place and eats all the food. A lady claims the old man to be her father and takes him away. |
| 55 | Kenichi Builds Boat (Try to do things on your own) (せっしゃ嫌われたでござるの巻) | Kenichi takes Hattori's handmade boat to school. Kemumaki doesn't believe Kenichi and tells him to prepare another boat, but Kenichi fails at it. |
| 56 | Cheating Is Not Allowed | Koike-Sensei and the kids cook the 'yami' and blindfold themselves before eating it. Kemumaki cheats in the rituals and gets punished for it. |
| 57 | I Will Look For A Kind Girl (All of them should live in peace) (男の意地ネズミ退治の巻) | Kio tries to trap a mouse, but Hattori saves it and tells the mouse to take his family and leave the house. |
| 58 | I Leave The Speech To Someone Else (Always help the needy) (スピーチは任せるでござるの巻) | Hattori gives Kentaru a recorder to help him in his speech but it fails. So, Hattori helps him complete his speech. |
| 59 | Bird's present for Yumeko-chan (Swallows For Yumeko) (夢子ちゃんにツバメのプレゼントの巻) | Kenichi and his friends build their nest on their rooftop for the birds, but Kemumaki gifts it to Yumeko. Later, Hattori teaches him a lesson. |
| 60 | The movie is rich (A Hard Day At The Movies) (映画はこりごりでござるの巻) | Shishimaru and Shinzou misbehave and disturb everyone at the theatre, so Hattori uses his technique to stop them from going with Yumeko. |
| 61 | Kemumaki, Let's Dig Up A Mammoth (The Prehistoric Bone) (ケムマキマンモスを掘りだせの巻) | Kemumaki claims a bone to be of an elephant from the ancient era. As Hattori gets to know about Kemumaki's false claims, he teaches him a lesson. |
| 62 | Shinzou's Balloons (Where Is The Balloon) (逃げた風船はどこにの巻) | Shinzou gets upset for losing his balloon. So, Hattori gifts Shinzou another balloon and makes him happy. |
| 63 | Shishimaru's Snores (Teaching Shishimaru A Lesson) (獅子丸のいびきは100ホーンの巻) | Shishimaru finds the alarm disturbing and puts it off. He gets everyone late, but at the end, Hattori's makes Shishimaru realise his mistake. |
| 64 | Yumeko's Love Song (It's bad to cheat your enemies) (舞い込んだラブレターの巻) | Kemumaki sends a courier with all question papers in it to Kenichi's place. Later, Hattori makes Kemumaki confess for cheating with Kenichi during his exams. |
| 65 | The Missing Book (The book on friendship) (ニンニン馬力で本さがしの巻) | Yumeko gives Kenichi a book to read. But, Kemumaki robs the book. So, Hattori manages to get a new one. |
| 66 | The Laughing Mushroom (The Story of the Strange Mushroom) (先生を笑わせろの巻) | As Koike-Sensei acts strict with the students, Hattori helps Kenichi to change Koike-Sensei in a natural way. |
| 67 | Shinzou And The Sad Movie (Shinzou goes to the Movie) (悲しい映画をみる方法の巻) | Shinzou and Shishimaru follow Hattori and Kenichi to the theatre. In an emotional scene, Shinzou falls asleep, so, Kenichi and Hattori feel relieved. |
| 68 | Flowers For Spring (Shinzou grows flowers) (お花畑をつくろうの巻) | As Shinzou gets excited about flowers, Hattori shifts the entire flower bed at the roof of their house and makes Shinzou happy. |
| 69 | No More Eating Race (The Eating Competition) (大喰い競争はこりごりでござるの巻) | In a competition, Kemumaki cheats, but Hattori gets him caught. At the end, Hattori wins the competition. |
| 70 | Hunt Away Mama's Anger (Drive Out the Anger Bug) (怒り虫を追い出せの巻) | Ama gets upset with Kentaru and vents out her anger on the kids. Hattori brings them together by making them remember their marriage days. |
| 71 | Tomatoes And Carrots (Tomatoes and Carrots are my favorites) (トマト・ニンジン大好きの巻) | As Kenichi refuses to eat vegetables, Hattori seeks help from Yumeko and succeeds in making Kenichi eat vegetables. |
| 72 | Lonely Little Kitty (Kiyo is Feeling All Alone) (ひとりぼっちの影千代の巻) | Kiyo feels lonely as Kemumaki goes out, so he stays with Ama. Later, Hattori calls Kemumaki back to take away Kio with him. |
| 73 | A Visit From The Teacher (A Dreadful Home Visit) (こわ～い家庭訪問の巻) | When Koike-Sensei visits Kenichi place to complain about Kenichi's cheating, the kids trouble him and send him away. |
| 74 | Police Chief For A Day (Kenichi becomes a Policeman for a Day) (ケン一氏の一日署長の巻) | Kenichi gets an opportunity to work with the police for a day. Hattori and his friends search a robber and get him caught. |
| 75 | No More Noodles! (Free Noodles are Dangerous) (ただのラーメンはこわいでござるの巻) | Kenichi and Shinzou visit a restaurant that serves free food, if one finishes the meal in 3 minutes. Kemumaki cheats and gets forced to pay the entire money. |
| 76 | Trouble At The Water Fountain (The Broken Tap) (水飲み場騒動の巻) | While Kenichi drinks water, the knob breaks and the water overflow. Hattori comes to help Kenichi and finds ways to stop the water. |
| 77 | Kenichi's Style (Kenichi Wants to Impress Yumeko) (夢子ちゃんのお守りになるんだの巻) | Kenichi dresses like Rocky and impresses Yumeko. Kemumaki troubles him, so Hattori takes revenge from Kemumaki and spoils his picture. |
| 78 | Spaghetti Has A Happy Taste (A Special juice for Kemumaki) (スパゲッティはしあわせの味の巻) | Shishimaru eats all the food that Ama cooks, so Yumeko helps in cooking. Hattori's prepares a juice for Kemumaki, but Kenichi drinks it. |
| 79 | A Wishing Star (The Story of the Falling Star) (流れ星に願いをかけての巻) | Kenichi looks for a shooting star to wish. Hattori uses his ninja technique to shows Kenichi a shooting star and fulfil his wish. |
| 80 | Teacher Likes Butterfly (The Right to Live) (先生はちょうちょがお好きの巻) | Koike-Sensei asks the students to search a butterfly. The students chase the butterfly, but do not succeed in catching it. |
| 81 | Ninja Sushi (The Magical Food) (ニンニン寿司は大はんじょうの巻) | As the kids feel hungry, they go to a place but find the shop closed. Hattori uses his ninja technique and brings food. |
| 82 | The Big Catch (Kenichi Spotted a Whale) (大発見巨大魚の巻) | Kenichi and his friends decide to find a whale through Hattori's help. They somehow manage to catch the fish, but later realise it's not a whale. |
| 83 | Shishimaru The Weather Dog (The Knowledgeable Shishimaru) (獅子丸の天気予報の巻) | Hattori decides to help Shishimaru recognise the foresight within him. Kemumaki tries to prove Shishimaru wrong but does not succeed. |
| 84 | A Wrestling Tournament (The Wrestling Match) (とんだ相撲合戦の巻) | Kemumaki challenges Kenichi to play a wrestling match, so Hattori decides to help Kenichi. In the end, no one wins. |
| 85 | TV Is Forbidden (Kenichi Watches the Television) (テレビは禁止でござるの巻) | Kenichi and Shinzo fool Hattori to watch TV but Hattori plays smart and teaches them a lesson. |
| 86 | Game Crazy (The Electronic Game) (ゲームに挑戦するでござるの巻) | Hattori and Kentaru play the bamboo stick game and ask Kenichi to join them, but he gets engrossed in the video game. Later, Kenichi learns the game and Ama gets addicted to the video game. |
| 87 | Late Again! (Kenichi is Late to School) (遅刻は校庭十周の巻) | Kenichi decides to stay awake and not sleep, so as to reach school on time but fails at it. |
| 88 | A Family Fight(Fight between mom and dad) (夫婦ゲンカは犬もクワンクワンの巻) | As Kentaru and Ama argue on silly topics, Kenichi, Hattori, Shinzo and Shishimaru try all possible ways and bring them together. |
| 89 | Tsubame The Ninja Girl (Hattori has a Guest) (ツバメ殿は手強い女忍者でござるの巻) | A ninja girl named Sonam comes to Kenichi's house. Sonam pampers Hattori and does all the housework. |
| 90 | Get Lost, Tsubame (Tsubame goes back home) (消えたツバメちゃんの巻) | Kenichi plans to trouble Sonam so that she leaves his house. After knowing about Kenichi's plans, she goes away. |
| 91 | A Drive In The Country (Kenichi and Hattori go on a Picnic) (ドライブはお気軽にの巻) | Kenichi and his family decide to go out for a picnic without carrying lunch. On the way, they eat the rice cakes that Hattori prepares. |
| 92 | Lost And Found (Yumeko Lost Her Money) (ボクっていけない子の巻) | Kenichi finds money fallen on the road. He later confesses the truth to his mother and she gives him money to return to the person. |
| 93 | My Dream For The Future (Kenichi Writes a Story) (ケン一氏のでっかい夢の巻) | Koike-Sensei gives the students an assignment of writing stories. Kenichi tells a story of a brave soldier. |
| 94 | Kenichi demands more pocket money (Mommy's lost purse) (こづかい値上げ作戦の巻) | Ama refuses to give Kenichi money. Later, Kenichi and his friends help Ama, and they get money in return for it. |
| 95 | Powercut (There's no electricity in the house) (電気がなくても楽しい我が家の巻) | Due to lightning, the lights go off. When Kentaru returns home, the family sit together and eat biscuits for dinner. |
| 96 | Hattori, the grasshopper (Kenichi participates in the quiz competition) (忍法虫変化?!の巻) | Hattori hypnotises an insect and sends it with Kenichi for a quiz. During the quiz, the insect falls sick. So, Kenichi gives the insect a solution and makes it well. |
| 97 | The great novelist (We almost got trapped) (忍者屋敷へご招待の巻) | A novelist traps Shishimaru, Shinzo and Kenichi, but Hattori saves them. Then, the man apologizes to everyone for his behaviour. |
| 98 | Kemumaki's secret (Kemumaki goes to the spa) (おへその秘密をさぐるの巻) | Kemumaki refuses to go to a water park, as he can't wear a swimming trunk. Hattori feels happy to see Kemumaki wear Ninja underwear. |
| 99 | The ancient era (They work as a team) (原始時代はニンニンでござるの巻) | Kenichi refuses to agree that every century has a good side and a bad side to it, so Hattori takes everyone to the previous century. |
| 100 | Catch That Home Run! (Kenichi Makes a Home Run) (ホームランボールをつかめの巻) | Kemumaki and Kenichi watch baseball match in a stadium and bring a ball for Yumeko, but she refuses to believe that it's a home run ball. |
| 101 | The Festival (Hattori Goes To the Fair) (ワッショイ祭りでござるの巻) | Hattori, Kenichi, Shinzo and Shishimaru take a bath and go to the fair. They earn a lot of gifts from the fair and enjoy themselves. |
| 102 | I Don't Like The Marriage Meeting (A New Bride for the Teacher) (お見合いは苦手でござるの巻) | A girl comes to visit Koike-Sensei in Kenichi's house and talk about marriage, but Kenichi scares the girl away. |
| 103 | Swimming Training (Kenichi Goes Swimming) (とんだ水泳修業の巻) | Kenichi, Hattori and Shinzo decide to learn to swim. Shinzo hypnotises Kenichi and makes him a frog so that he swims by himself. |
| 104 | What Day Is Today? (Mother's Day Special) (今日は何の日の巻) | On the occasion of mother's day, the kids and Kentaru send Ama out and take up the responsibility of the house. |
| 105 | Jumping Contest (The Exciting Frog Race) (ケロケロ忍法でジャンプ競争の巻) | Kemumaki and Kenichi decide to have a race between their frogs. Kemumaki and Kenichi train their frogs but Kenichi's frog wins the race. |
| 106 | Shishimaru Is A Stupid (Teacher Meets a Girl) (獅子丸はキューピットでござるの巻) | Koike-Sensei goes to a restaurant to talk to a girl about marriage, but Shishimaru messes up things and as a result, she leaves. |
| 107 | We Will Marry Kagechiyo (Hattori Helps Kiyo) (影千代ムコ入り大作戦の巻) | Kenichi supports Kiyo in the cat competition as Kemumaki disowns him. Kemumaki tries to ruin Kiyo's image. Later, they patch up. |
| 108 | Let's Challenge To A Skyscraper (Hattori Climbs In Skyscraper) (超高層ビルに挑戦するでござるの巻) | Kemumaki creates obstacles for Hattori in a challenge to climb a tall building. Hattori completes his challenge and also helps Kemumaki. |
| 109 | Ninja From Manipulation (Tsubame Helps Hattori) (ツバメ忍法カエルあやつりの巻) | Kemumaki troubles Sonam and Hattori, but Hattori doesn't react. Sonam feels bad because Hattori didn't consider her strong, and she leaves. |
| 110 | Secret Of The Ninja Power (No Food for Hattori) (ニンニン馬力の秘密の巻) | Kemumaki plays a trick on Hattori and finds out the reason for his strength. Kemumaki sees Hattori getting power by carrot. So He also eats. |
| 111 | Shinzo's Navel-Power (Shinzo Had a Dream) (シンちゃんのヘソパワーの巻) | Shinzo assumes that he has received lightning power and tries to use them to help people. But, Hattori makes Shinzo realize that he has no powers. |
| 112 | Mama Knows Everything (Somebody is Following Mom) (ママ上忍法おみとおしの巻) | Kenichi, Shinzo and Shishimaru suspect a ninja behind Ama's behaviour, so they take Hattori's help but realize that they were wrong. |
| 113 | Shishimaru, An Enthusiastic Detective (The Golden Cigars) (熱中探偵獅子丸の巻) | After watching a detective serial on TV, Shishimaru gets a dream, in which he acts as a detective. He disturbs everyone sleeping. |
| 114 | Ninja Watermelon Snapping (Everyone Goes for a Picnic) (忍法スイカ割りの巻) | Koike-Sensei plays 'break the watermelon game' with the students. Hattori breaks the watermelon in to pieces with his tricks. |
| 115 | Nerd Kenichi (Hard Work Always Pays) (ガリ勉ケン一氏誕生!?の巻) | Kenichi acts as a book worm due to hypnotism. But after the hypnotism fades, Kenichi gets back to normal. |
| 116 | Don't Cry Tsubame (Tsubame comes to meet Hattori) (ツバメちゃん泣かないでの巻) | Hattori finds Sonam and helps her from being blamed as a robber. Hattori leaves and keeps the secret that he likes Sonam. |
| 117 | My Friend Is A Dinosaur (Kenichi Makes A Dinosaur) (友だちは恐竜少年の巻) | While learning about the handmade dinosaur, Kemumaki breaks it. Mitachi blames Kenichi for breaking it, but later asks for forgiveness. |
| 118 | Kenichi Is A Good Class Officer (Truth and Honesty Always Wins) (クラス委員は幻と消えたの巻) | Kemumaki changes his voice and speaks to Ama and Yumeko. So, Hattori makes Kemumaki confess the truth to Yumeko. |
| 119 | The Ninja Pilotage (Bad Talks Always Leads to Bad Deeds) (科学忍法ヒコーキ操りの巻) | Kenichi's flies a remote control helicopter. Kemumaki tries to create a rift between Yumeko and Kenichi. But Hattori makes Kemumaki confess the truth. |
| 120 | Mama Loves Telephone (Children are Smarter Sometimes) (ママ上は電話がお好きでござるの巻) | As Mama spends more time talking to Sunidhi, Hattori makes her and Sunidhi realize that mothers should pay attention to their children. |
| 121 | Shinzo and Tortoise (The ninja and tortoise race) (浦島太郎には困ったでござるの巻) | Shinzo and Shishimaru see a tortoise and decide to sit on him to reach Ninja paradise. Later, they get to know that the tortoise was a lost pet. |
| 122 | When Is My Birthday? (Shishimaru Celebrates his Birthday) (誕生日をさがすでござるの巻) | Shishimaru feels sad as no one knows his birth date. So, Hattori takes the form of Shishimaru's grandfather to tell him his birth date. |
| 123 | Mom Is Lost Driver (Mom Takes Us for a Ride) (ママ上は迷ドライバーの巻) | Ama sits in the car confidently but finds it difficult to drive. Later, Kentaru teaches Ama how to drive. |
| 124 | Tsubame Wants To Go To The Beach (Tsubame Goes To Beach) (ツバメどのだって海へ行きたいの巻) | Sonam takes a form to participate in the beach cleanup, but Kemumaki snatches it from her. Hattori reaches at the right time and saves her. |
| 125 | Dog Is Great (Shishimaru and his Dream) (お犬様はエライんじゃワンの巻) | Shishimaru sees a dream in which he gets all the facilities he needs. After waking up, he realizes it was a dream. |
| 126 | Mama's Good Idea (Our New Clothes) (ママ上アイディア作戦の巻) | Ama stitches clothes for the kids. As water falls on the cloth, Hattori cuts it and later realizes that shirt does not fit Kenichi. |
| 127 | Don't Get Fooled By Pretty Girls (A Fancy Dress Competition) (美女によろめくべからずの巻) | Kemumaki changes his look to a girl so that Yumeko gets angry on Kenichi, but Hattori uses his tricks and resolves the confusion. |
| 128 | Eels Are God's Messengers (Preserving Nature) (うなぎは神様のお使いでござるの巻) | Kenichi and his friends bring a fish home. Kentaru invite his friends to eat the fish, but Hattori makes the guests forget about it. |
| 129 | Capturing A Gang (Look Before You Leave) (銀行強盗生け捕り作戦の巻) | Kenichi, Shishimaru and Shinzo find a diary of a man and assume that he is a robber, but later find out that the man is a porter. |
| 130 | Mama Practices For Volleyball (Health is Wealth) (ママ上のバレーボール特訓の巻) | Mama practices for Kenichi's sports day, but Hattori gets to know that the event has been cancelled, so he makes Mama forget about the game. |
| 131 | Be careful When You Deliver (Shishimaru A Boxer) (お届けものは慎重にの巻) | Kenichi gets a gift for Yumeko, but Kemumaki exchanges it. Hattori finds out about Kemumaki's plan and gives Yumeko the correct gift. |
| 132 | Shinzo Forgets His Money (Anniversary Day) (やさしい女の子を探すでござるの巻) | Shinzo forgets the money at home, so a passerby pays for the pastries. Later, they all go to her place and thank her. |
| 133 | Bullfighting Trouble (The Bullfight) (とんだ闘牛騒動の巻) | When Kenichi and his friends play the bull chasing game, Kemumaki and Kio challenge Shinzo and bring a real bull for the game, but Hattori saves Shinzo. |
| 134 | A Strange Foreigner (Kiyo's Birthday Celebrations) (甲賀忍者おかしな外人さんの巻) | Nandu and Kiyo meet Kenichi and his friends. Kio suspects something fishy about their plans, but gets a surprise from Kenichi and his friends. |
| 135 | Get Back The Dress (New Clothes For Shinzo) (ワンピースを取り返せの巻) | Hattori forces Shinzo to wear a dress, so Hattori calls Sonam and gives her the dress. |
| 136 | Tsubame Guard The Snack (Tsubame in Hattori's House) (ツバメちゃんおやつを守るの巻) | Ama goes out and hands over the responsibility of the house to Sonam. Sonam feels bad for attacking Hattori and leaves. |
| 137 | Hattori Has Disappeared (Hattori Leaves Home) (消えたハットリくんの巻) | Kemumaki exchanges Hattori's letters in order to stay in the house. So, Hattori takes Kentaru's look and makes Kemumaki and Kio do all his work. |
| 138 | The Ninjaman Changing (All of Them are Waiting to see the Move) (ツバメ忍法人変化の巻) | Sonam takes Yumeko's form to spend time with Hattori. So, Hattori too takes Yumeko's form and confuses her. |
| 139 | The Ninja Future Watching (Always Try to Overcome Boredom) (秘密忍法で未来を見たの巻) | Hattori hypnotises Kenichi and finds out the actual reason of him being irritated. Hattori teaches Kenichi the value of friends and gets him back to normal. |
| 140 | I Am In A Slump (Kemumaki helps Hattori) (拙者スランプでござるの巻) | Hattori loses his confidence and finds it difficult to use his powers. Kemumaki kidnaps Shishimaru to regain Hattori's confidence. |
| 141 | I Am Still Immature (Hattori and the Thief) (拙者もまだまだ未熟でござるの巻) | A salesman seeks help from Hattori. But, Hattori gets to know the man was a robber and feels deceived. |
| 142 | The Ninja Mosquito (Friendliness is Godliness) (カッカッカ、カカ忍法の巻) | Kemumaki calls for artificial mosquitoes and troubles everyone at Kenichi's place. So, Hattori attacks Kemumaki with mosquitoes. |
| 143 | The Ninja Gardening (Shinzo messed up with Yumeko's garden) (植木の手入れも忍法でござるの巻) | Kenichi insists Hattori to help Yumeko in gardening. Later, they get a cake from Yumeko. |
| 144 | Who Is Yumeko's Friend? (Kenichi misunderstood Hattori) (夢子ちゃんの友だちは？の巻) | During the speech competition, Yumeko talks about her friendship with Hattori. On hearing the speech, Kenichi apologises to Hattori for doubting him. |
| 145 | I Have Been Disliked (It's fun to have guests on New Year's Eve) (お正月のお客は楽しみでござるの巻) | Kenichi's cousin misbehaves with Kenichi and his friends, so Hattori teaches him a lesson and later, they become friends. |
| 146 | Fight For Seat (A Fight for Getting a Seat) (とんだ席とり合戦でござるの巻) | Kemumaki and Kenichi play a game to decide who sits next to Yumeko. At the end, both get a seat next to Yumeko. |
| 147 | Mommy Does Weight Reduction (Mom's Weight Reduction) (ママのビューティーパワー全開の巻) | Mitsuba starts reducing weight by exercising in Morning 5:00 am and makes healthy everyone. |
| 148 | It Is at Beat, But a Throwing Knife (Hattori looks for his weapon) (たかが手裏剣一枚だけどの巻) | Hattori recollects the right location of his missing weapon and gets it back. |
| 149 | The Secret Of Hattori-Hood (Kemumaki and Kenichi fail in their attempts) (ハットリ頭巾の秘密の巻) | Yumeko tries to click Hattori's picture with the help of Kenichi, but Hattori does not allow them. |
| 150 | Be Careful When You Deliver (Shishimaru a Boxer) (お届けものは慎重にの巻) | Kenichi gets a gift for Yumeko, but Kemumaki exchanges it. Hattori finds out about Kemumaki's plan and gives Yumeko the correct gift. |
| 151 | Kenichi too can read! (Kenichi finds it hard to read) (朗読はぼくにおまかせの巻) | Kemumaki underestimates Kenichi as he can't read well in the class. Kenichi impresses his classmates and teacher with Hattori's help. |
| 152 | Hattori vs. frogs! (Hattori's biggest fear) (カエル合戦冬の陣の巻) | Kemumaki challenges Hattori and attacks him with frogs. But Hattori uses a ninja technique over the frogs and win over Kemumaki. |
| 153 | Tsubame and Ama's secret! (Tsubame's big secret) (ツバメとママの秘密を暴けの巻) | Hattori finds Sonam outside the house in a bad state and brings her in the house. Sonam hides in the room as her face is swollen. |

=== Season 2 ===
| Japanese EP# | Title | Synopsis |
|---|---|---|
| 154 | Cheating is bad! (The tennis match) (影千代冬眠すの巻) | Kio acts as a frog and cheats to make Kemumaki win a match. Hence, Hattori makes Kio hide his face in the ground.They meet ninja hattori's father DhruvKumar |
| 155 | Shinzo feels homesick! (Shinzo misses home) (シンちゃんのホームシックの巻) | Kemumaki hypnotizes Shinzo and reminds him of his hometown. So, Hattori uses the same ninja technique over Kemumaki and makes him remember his mother. |
| 156 | Koike-sensei's spying habit! (Teacher's new ninja technique) (先生忍法千里眼の巻) | Kenichi gets upset as Koike-Sensei gets to know about his thoughts. But Hattori and Kenichi get to know that the teacher records everything. |
| 157 | An alien fortune teller! (The alien spaceship) (なんたってUFOでござるの巻) | Kemumaki takes the look of an alien and troubles Kenichi. So, Hattori plays the same prank on Kemumaki and Kio and scare them. |
| 158 | Surviving the cold! (The winter competition) (寒さに強いケン一氏の巻) | The teacher challenges the students to wear a singlet and short pant to school in the cold weather. Hattori uses a ninja technique and sends Kenichi to school. |
| 159 | Yumie and Shinzo's friendship! (Shinzo's new friend) (おてんば春風ふきすぎての巻) | Yumie challenges Shinzo to perform stunts. Shinzo practices day and night to win the challenge and befriends her. |
| 160 | Attending the Dolphin show (The Dolphin Show) (消えたイルカの巻) | When Kenichi and his friends watch the dolphin show, the dolphins go out into the sea. So Hattori performs as a dolphin. |
| 161 | Ninja technique vs. modern technology (Hattori's dream becomes true) (未来都市の忍者でござるの巻) | Hattori feels that the world is habituated to machines and no one considers ninja techniques. Later, Hattori wakes up and realizes it was a nightmare. |
| 162 | Kemumaki A little in love with his mother (Kemumaki and his love for his mother) (ケムマキちょっぴり母さん恋しの巻) | Kemumaki fears to express himself, so Hattori uses the ninja technique and makes Kemumaki speak about his mother. |
| 163 | Celebrating New Year (The New Year's bell) (夢子殿のために鐘は鳴るでござるの巻) | Kenichi wins a lucky draw of ringing the bell on New Year's Eve. Hattori and his friends help Kenichi ring the bell 108 times. |
| 164 | Shishimaru's obsession of chocolate rolls (No chocolate rolls for Shishimaru) (チクワなんか嫌いじゃわんの巻) | Shishimaru pretends and makes everyone believe that he hates chocolate rolls. But later, eats all of them. |
| 165 | Kenichi fears losing Shishimaru (Kenichi's secret story) (見られちゃならない男の涙の巻) | Kenichi tells Shishimaru a story that he read, and they both get emotional. Hattori uses his Ninja technique to know the reason behind their tears. |
| 166 | Shinzo refuses to change his clothes (Ninja's Undergarment) (シンちゃんは何故きがえないの!?の巻) | Shinzo refuses to change his clothes as Sonam had stitched flowers over it. So, Ama changes the looks of his clothes. |
| 167 | Voting for the famous teacher (Keep your city clean) (とんだ人気投票の巻) | Koike-Sensei seeks help from Hattori to change the minds of people and become the most famous teacher of the school and the city. |
| 168 | Kenichi becomes Mr. India (Hattori's new clothes) (透明人間をつかまえろの巻) | Kenichi, Kio and Kemumaki go to find Mr. India and get his pictures. But Kenichi does not disclose the fact that it was Hattori's plan. |
| 169 | Measuring the speed of the ball (Don't Cheat While Playing) (やさしい速球投手の巻) | When the children play baseball, Kemumaki uses his Ninja technique to win, so Hattori teaches him a lesson |
| 170 | Kio lives Shishimaru's life (Kio becomes Shishimaru) (影千代三葉家に潜入！の巻) | Kio takes Shishimaru's form and enters Kenichi's house to live a lavish life. Later, when Hattori and Shinzo ask Kio to train them, he escapes. |
| 171 | Search for hot water well (The Hot Water Spring) (街に温泉がでたの巻) | Hattori arranges for a trolley and puts Shishimaru in it, to sense a hot water well. Kemumaki takes the trolley and digs a hole leading to the spa. |
| 172 | Always give it a try (Try and You Will Always Succeed) (ケン一氏は外出嫌い！の巻) | Kenichi is upset because he doesn't know how to play football. Next day, Kenichi goes out to play on Hattori's insistence. |
| 173 | Respect your name (Your Name is Your Identity) (僕の名前は三葉ケン一の巻) | Kenichi gets upset with the meaning of his name. Hattori changes everyone's names in to numbers, so that Kenichi respects his name. |
| 174 | Tsubame's talent (Tsubame Becomes a Homemaker) (ツバメ特製ファンタジック弁当の巻) | Sonam packs Kenichi's tiffin and surprises him. Kemumaki and Kio make a plan against Kenichi but Hattori gets to know and teaches him a lesson. |
| 175 | Kio takes Shishimaru's form (Because Kio would be punished by Amara who is just running for the sake of fish) (影千代再び三葉家に潜入！の巻) | Kio takes Shishimaru's form to eat fish. Hattori lies to Kemumaki about Kio. Later, Hattori sends a piece of fish for Kio. |
| 176 | Ninja Mizugumo Technique learns from Kemumaki (Shinzo walks on water) (忍法水蜘蛛はケムマキに習うでござるの巻) | Shinzo wears Hattori's old slippers. Later, he applies wax on the slippers given by Kemumaki and walks on water. |
| 177 | Shinzou forgot his tears (Shinzo feels emotionally strong) (涙を忘れたシンゾウの巻) | Shinzo decides to be emotionally strong and not cry at silly things. So, Kemumaki uses a Ninja technique and controls Shinzo's emotions. |
| 178 | Separating Yumeko and Hattori (I love Yumeko a lot) (夢子ちゃんが大好きでござるの巻) | Kemumaki and his friends assume that Hattori and Yumeko like each other. They use Ninja technique on Hattori. But, Hattori reverses the technique. |
| 179 | Tsubame learns a new technique (A diary of tears) (涙・ナミダの騒動記の巻) | Shinzo and Sonam apply a Ninja technique on Hattori to make him cry. But, Hattori uses the technique on them itself. |
| 180 | Helping Koike-sensei (Rather than convenient, it is inconvenient) (便利なくらしは不便でござるの巻) | Kemumaki and Kenichi help Koike-Sensei as he is not well. But, Koike-Sensei gets into trouble when a substitute teacher visits him. |
| 181 | A bright day with a smile (Kenichi upsets Yumeko) (笑顔で明るい一日の巻) | Hattori uses a technique on Kenichi, so that he laughs at every situation. Kenichi laughs at Yumeko and upsets her. |
| 182 | Scavenger hunt (Sports activity) (とんだ借り物競争の巻) | During the sports day, Kemumaki creates obstacles for Kenichi. But later, Kemumaki gets into trouble when Hattori changes the chit. |
| 183 | Shinzou's left hand strengthening strategy (Shinzo multitasks) (シンゾウの左手強化作戦の巻) | Shinzo learns to perform activities using both his hands. After failing at several attempts, Hattori uses a Ninja technique and helps him. |
| 184 | Did you see it! Ninja fever technique (Kemumaki pretends to be sick) (見たか！忍法熱さましの巻) | Kemumaki pretends to be sick. On knowing the truth, Hattori and his friends put him in a tub filled with ice cold water. |
| 185 | Special training! Special training! Also special training (Shaman and Kenichi's training) (特訓！特訓！また特訓でござるの巻) | Kemumaki uses Ninja techniques over Shaman, while Hattori uses over Kenichi. Shaman and Kenichi finish the race together to avoid cheating. |
| 186 | The taste of Teacher love and bath (Teacher loves his mother's cooking) (先生恋しやおふくろの味の巻) | Koike-Sensei feels unhappy as his mother feeds him chocolate cake every day. Hattori changes his look and talks to Kokei-Sensei's mother. |
| 187 | Kenichi will lead the parade (Kenichi is the parade commander) (ケン一氏指揮者になる!?の巻) | Kemumaki fools Kenichi in regards to the parade. So, Hattori uses his Ninja technique and puts Kenichi's name in the teacher's mind. |
| 188 | Delivering Kentaru's documents (Feeling responsible) (伊賀忍法かえだま作戦の巻) | Kemumaki takes Kentaru's papers from Hattori and puts them in the shredder. Later, Hattori reveals that the real documents were in his clothes. |
| 189 | Laundry machine trouble (The story of the washing machine) (コインランドリー騒動の巻) | Kenichi and his friends go to the spa laundry to wash the clothes. There, Hattori uses his technique and washes the clothes. |
| 190 | The lost cat (Shinzo and the little cat) (シンちゃんを困らせたすて猫の巻) | A kitty refuses to leave Shinzo and follows him everywhere. Somehow, Shinzo gets rid of the kitty and returns home with Hattori and Shishimaru. |
| 191 | Kenichi panics (Hattori works for money) (危うし！ケン一氏の巻) | So as to pay the restaurant bill, Hattori goes out to sells his things. Then, he takes money from Ama and rushes to Kenichi. |
| 192 | Bubble ball (The bubble war) (忍法泡玉で勝負でござるの巻) | Hattori and Kemumaki compete with each other with bubbles. Hattori blows many bubbles with his face in it and attacks Kemumaki. |
| 193 | A hamster (The story of the rats) (おー！ハムスターの巻) | Hattori uses a technique with the help of Shishimaru by turning him into a rat hamster to generate electricity. |
| 194 | Turned small (How Kemumaki was fooled) (ハッタリ忍法一寸法師の巻) | Hattori and Kenichi use posters and draw large pictures on them of the things in the room, to make Kemumaki, Kio, Shinzo and Shishimaru look small. |
| 195 | Tsubame extracts a tooth (Don't tell lies) (ムシバ退治はツバメにおまかせの巻) | Kenichi, Shinzo and Shishimaru play a prank on Sonam and Hattori, by making Sonam extract Hattori's tooth. But, Hattori stops Sonam. |
| 417 | Over caring also hurts (The whip of love too is painful) (愛のムチもつらいでござるの巻) | Hattori promises to not help Kenichi in any way. But when Kenichi and Kemumaki get into a cycle race, Hattori breaks his promise and helps Kenichi by tying an anchor to Kemumaki's cycle. |
| 418 | Yumeko loves dandelions (Yumeko likes dandelions) (夢子殿はタンポポがお好きの巻) | Kenichi assumes that Yumeko wants white dandelion flowers. On not finding a white dandelion flower, Kenichi gifts a yellow dandelion flower to Yumeko, and takes the credit for it alone. |
| 419 | Part-time job strategy (Hattori's part-time jobs) (アルバイト大作戦の巻) | As Kenichi requires money to purchase a game, he and Shinzo make Hattori work at different places and collect a lot of money. But when Hattori gets to know the truth, he scolds them. |
| 420 | I'm Kenichi Mitsuba (Kenichi and Hattori exchange roles) (拙者三葉ケン一でござるの巻) | Kenichi sends Hattori to school in place of him. When Kemumaki gets to know, he tells Kokei-Sensei to make Hattori clean the lab as there are frogs there. But, Kenichi reaches on time and exchanges his role. |
| 421 | Watch your butt (Be careful It may hurt) (お尻には注意するでござるの巻) | While sliding on a jumbo slide, Kenichi rips the skin of his bum. Kemumaki takes advantage of his situation and troubles him. Later, during a fire drill, Hattori helps Kenichi and rips his skin as well. |
| 422 | Mr. Kenichi's Cooking Madness (Kenichi, the chef) (ケン一氏の料理狂時代の巻) | Kenichi prepares a meal for everyone, but doesn't let anyone eat it. He keeps it for his classmates and teachers. The next day, his classmates and teacher criticise the food due to its taste. |
| 423 | A moving warrior doll (Kiyo stuck in the costume!) (動きだした武者人形の巻) | Kiyo wears the Mitsuba family's traditional costume and gets stuck in it. Hattori notices Kiyo in the costume and plays a trick to get him out of the costume without letting anyone know the truth. |
| 424 | Teacher's magic (Teacher's magic show!) (先生の大魔術の巻) | The teacher creates a new machine to showcase his magic tricks. Kenichi wears a wood around his neck to be saved from being hurt. However, the teacher plays a different game with Kenichi. |
| 425 | Shishimaru's ninja training technique (Shishimaru's Ninja training) (獅子丸の忍法修業の巻) | Shishimaru leaves the house and promises to return once he gets responsible. Shishimaru sees a puppy in trouble and saves it, which was a part of Hattori's plan to make him responsible. |
| 427 | Ninja outdoor test technique (The Ninja field exercises) (忍法野外テストの巻) | Hattori asks Shinzo to find a ninja secret, as part of their ninja training. Shinzo finds it, but Kio snatches it from him and drops it from the mountain. |
| 428 | Overboard (Kenichi misses his stop) (とんだ乗りすごしの巻) | Kenichi loses his way home and reaches an unknown place. Hattori thinks about the sounds that he heard on the phone, and follows it. Later, he manages to find Kenichi. |
| 429 | Famous cameraman, Mr. Kenichi (Kenichi is a good cameraman) (名カメラマン・ケン一氏の巻) | Kenichi participates in the photography competition and invites Yumeko to his place to pose for photographs using a mini studio. But, Kemumaki destroys Kenichi's pictures. So, Hattori teaches Kemumaki a lesson. |
| 430 | Be in the weather tomorrow! (May tomorrow be a nice day!) (あした天気になあれ！の巻) | Yumeko is upset because of the rains, as she can't participate in her tennis match. So, Hattori helps Yumeko with a successful plan, and helps her in practicing tennis. |
| 431 | Proverb training (Proverb exercises) (ことわざ大特訓の巻) | Hattori teaches Kenichi proverbs by giving him live examples, but Kio and Kemumaki trouble Kenichi and create a wrong impression of Hattori on him. Later, Kenichi decides to study by himself and get ready for the test. |
| 432 | Take back the answer sheet (Let's get the exam papers back) (答案用紙を取り返せの巻) | Kenichi tries to hide his test papers from his family, as he scores low marks. But unfortunately, the book reaches Kentaru. At the end, Hattori helps Kenichi get his test papers back. |
| 433 | 4th grade 2nd class is chrysalis disturbance (Chrysalis trouble) (4年2組はサナギ騒動の巻) | When Hattori returns Kenichi's belongings, which were stuck on the tree, a chrysalis falls off the branch. Hattori and his friends save the chrysalis, and manage to save the butterfly from getting trapped. |
| 434 | It's summer! Camping in the valley! (Activities in the summer camp) (夏だ！谷間でキャッホーでござるの巻) | Kenichi and Yumeko lose their way back to the camp. But Hattori uses the ninja technique of saving with wood and manages to save Kenichi and Yumeko from drowning in the water. |
| 435 | Living the primitive lifestyle! (The past has set a new task) (いまこそ原始生活！の巻) | The teacher tells the students to save resources for future. So, the Mitsuba family begin living a saving lifestyle on Hattori's insistence. Kemumaki and Kio make the Mitsuba family famous unintentionally. |
| 436 | Yumeko's bracelet! (Yumeko lost her bracelet) (消えた夢子ちゃんのブレスレットの巻) | Kenichi drops Yumeko's bracelet in the water by mistake. Hattori follows the direction of the fishes and finds the bracelet. Even after Kio's interference, Hattori manages to hand over the bracelet to Yumeko. |
| 438 | An adventurous holiday! (We are going to go to the lazy resort) (ものぐさ温泉の巻) | The Mitsuba family go to a hotel. Kentaru and Ama get scared on seeing animals in the pond. So, Hattori talks to the monkeys, who provide a good service to the Mitsuba family. |
| 439 | The maker of my fear (A successful bravery contest) (拙者恐怖の仕掛人でござるの巻) | Hattori helps a man from the locality to organize a bravery contest. Hattori scares everyone at the contest, and executes the bravery contest successfully with the help of Shinzo and Shishimaru. |
| 440 | Panic when mama isn't around (A lost child) (ママ上が居ないとパニックでござるの巻) | On hearing a child cry, Kenichi, Shishimaru and Shinzo get the child home. Later, the neighbor finds her grandchild with Kenichi, while Hattori searches the baby. |
| 441 | Steal the footprints! (Kenichi's project) (足跡を盗め！の巻) | Kenichi collects footprints of animals and human. As Kemumaki trouble Kenichi, Hattori decides to teach him a lesson. Hattori takes a print of Kemumaki, and Kenichi displays it in the class for his project. |
| 442 | Ninja gum balloon technique (The bubble gum) (忍法ガム風船の巻) | As Kemumaki troubles Kenichi, Kenichi decides to teach Kemumaki a lesson. Next day, Kemumaki challenges Hattori. Hattori gets into trouble, but he manages to beat Kemumaki and teach him a lesson. |
| 443 | Avec three-legged (Three-Legged race) (アベック二人三脚でござるの巻) | Sonam helps Kenichi in a race. Kemumaki tries to use his Ninja technique and win, but fails in doing so. At the end, Kenichi wins the race. And they all get surprised on seeing Sonam in the get up of Yumeko. |
| 444 | Let's save money and go to the movies! (Kenichi saves money) (つもり貯金で映画にいこう！の巻) | Hattori teaches Kenichi how to save money. When Kenichi starts saving money, Kemumaki forces Kenichi to spend it. At the end, Hattori makes Kemumaki return the money to Kenichi. |
| 445 | Cleanliness freak! (Cleanliness) (ニンニン！清潔第一でござるの巻) | Kemumaki and Kio spray a liquid on Kenichi's washed handkerchief to make it look dirty. So, Hattori and Sonam build anger in Yumeko for Kemumaki by making him a cleanliness freak. |
| 446 | Shishimaru learns a lesson! (Shishimaru a fat pig) (新忍法火の玉パワーの巻) | Hattori gets angry on Shishimaru as he puts on weight. But Shishimaru realizes his mistake and trains himself to become slim. Kio tempts Shishimaru with chocolate rolls, but Shishimaru overpowers the temptations. |
| 447 | Surprise stunts! (The talent show) (拙者！テレビ出演おことわりでござるの巻) | Kenichi insists Hattori perform some surprise stunts on TV. But Hattori refuses to appear on TV. However, Hattori goes on the TV sets and performs stunts to make Kenichi happy without appearing on TV. |
| 448 | Chinese ninja technique! (There's a new ninja master in town) (中国忍法に挑戦するでござるの巻) | Kemumaki takes the look of a wrestler and fools Kenichi, Shinzo, and Shishimaru. But Hattori reaches there and fights the Chinese wrestler and gets the truth out of Kemumaki. |
| 449 | I'm weightless (The Space Ride) (気分はめっきり無重力！の巻) | Kemumaki challenges Hattori to take them to space. So, Hattori along with Shinzo and Shishimaru organize a setup based on space. Hattori manages to make Kenichi and his friends feel the space. |
| 450 | Kenichi's psychokinesis (Magical tricks) (ケン一氏のサイコキネシスの巻) | Kenichi gets jealous as Yumeko praises Hattori. So, Kemumaki takes advantage and plays a prank with Kenichi by teaching him magic. Hattori and Sonam help Kenichi do the magic, and teaches Kemumaki a lesson. |
| 451 | The voice of insects on an autumn night (Kenichi turns into a grasshopper) (秋の夜は虫の声の巻) | Kenichi relates himself to the grasshoppers and feels sad when Yumeko calls the grasshoppers lazy. So, Hattori uses his ninja technique to turn Kenichi into a grasshopper. |
| 452 | Bodybuilding training! (The bodybuilder Kenichi) (忍法筋肉づくりはニンニンでござるの巻) | Kenichi trains himself to be a bodybuilder in order to impress Yumeko. Yumeko tells Kenichi that she was just studying the statue of the body builder and that she like Kenichi the way he is. |
| 453 | Preventing flu (Kenichi's technique of fighting cold) (風邪ひき防止大作戦の巻) | Hattori wakes Kenchi and trains him to perform regular exercises. He also teaches him how to deal with winters. Kemumaki interferes and tries to stop them in all possible ways, but fails in doing so. |
| 454 | Installing the security system (Ninja Hattori accepted a challenge) (防犯システムに挑戦するでござるの巻) | Kenichi and his friends, except Hattori, enter Kokei-Sensei's home to test the home security system. But fail at it. Hattori enters Kokei-Sensei's house and completes the challenge. |
| 455 | Christmas cake and house cleaning (Reward for good work) (クリスマスケーキと大そうじの巻) | Kenichi brings a cake at home. Hattori takes Yumeko's form and makes Kenichi, Shinzo and Shishimaru clean the house. Ama and Kentaru feel very happy. They all eat the cake together. |
| 456 | Hattori fears frogs (Hattori is not afraid of frogs) (カエルなんてこわくないでござるの巻) | To overcome Hattori's fear of frogs, Kenichi shows Hattori some pictures of the frogs. Kemumaki takes the get up of Hattori's uncle and then of the frogs to scare Hattori. But, Hattori tries to control his fear. |
| 457 | Change in Hattori's personality (Hattori becomes Kemumaki) (忍法別人格はおそろしいの巻) | Hattori hypnotizes himself and becomes Kemumaki, and troubles everyone. After a while, Hattori faints. And after he wakes up, he gets back to normal and confesses the truth to everyone. |
| 458 | Kenichi's perfect score (Kenichi scores good marks) (ケン一氏が100点取った???の巻) | Kenichi scores well in his exam. When Kemumaki gets to know about Kenichi's results, he tries to stop the teacher from distributing them, but gets caught by Hattori. Kenichi finally gets his exam papers. |
| 459 | Penalty game (Never scare your friend) (ござるといったら罰金でござるの巻) | Kemumaki troubles Hattori him with a toy frog. Shinzo helps him get rid of the frog but hurts himself and starts crying. Hattori learns about Kemumaki's plan and teaches him a lesson. |
| 460 | Pyramid power (Friendliness is godliness) (ピラミッドパワーで100点をとろうの巻) | Kenichi starts making a pyramid. Yumeko gives a pyramid to him, sent by Kemumaki. Next morning, Kemumaki plays a prank over Kenichi by diverting him from his exam. Hattori gets to know about Kemumaki and puts him in trouble. |
| 461 | Elections of the student council president! (Kenichi stands for the elections) (ケン一氏生徒会長に立候補の巻) | Kenichi stands for elections of student council president. Kemumaki forces Kenichi to make promises which he can't fulfill. So Hattori plays the same tricks on Kemumaki. |
| 462 | Underground hideout! (Scary cats will go home) (寒さしのぎは土とんの術での巻) | Shinzo, Shishimaru, and Kenichi stay in a secret hideout to be saved from the cold. Kio and Kemumaki get to know about the place and chase them out. But Hattori seals the gateway to the hideout. |
| 463 | Ointment allergy (Hattori falls sick) (ガマの油にゃガマンできぬの巻) | Kemumaki gives Hattori an ointment to heal his wound. But he gets very sick. Hattori drinks a herbal drink given by his master and teaches Kemumaki and Kio a lesson. |
| 464 | Creating a Guinness World Record (Hattori tries to set a Guinness Record) (ギネスブックに挑戦するでござるの巻) | Hattori take up the challenge on standing on one feet in order to create a Guinness World Record. Kemumaki plays his pranks on Hattori and drops him down. |
| 465 | Cookie gift (Yumeko celebrates friendship day) (ホワイト・デーにはクッキーでござるの巻) | On the occasion of friendship day, Hattori gifts Yumeko a box of cookies. Kemumaki exchanges Hattori's gift. But Hattori gets back the actual gift box and presents it to Yumeko in a unique way. |
| 466 | What a mistake (Hattori has a tough day) (拙者とて失敗はあるでござるの巻) | Hattori wets the bed in the morning. Later, he tells Kenichi about the activities he performed during the previous day. He tells him about the instances that upset him, which resulted in bedwetting. |
| 467 | Shishimaru's ninja mark! (Shishimaru takes revenge) (消えた獅子十字の巻) | Kemumaki creates a new mixture and clears off the ninja mark on Shishimaru's forehead. But the mark reappears again. Later, Hattori and Shishimaru paste Iga ninja marks on Kemumaki and Kio's body. |
| 468 | Hattori's craving for burgers! (Hattori loves to eat) (あこがれのハンバーガーでござるの巻) | Hattori tastes a burger from a burger shop and loves the taste of it, that he changes his looks to eat a lot of burgers from the shop. And later, he also eats all the cheese wraps brought by Kentaru. |
| 469 | Teacher's punishment! (The school cleaning job) (掃除当番を10倍楽しむ忍法の巻) | The teacher gives Kenichi a punishment of cleaning the floor of the school because of Kemumaki. So, Hattori takes the teacher's look and makes Kemumaki and Kio clean the toilets as a punishment. |
| 470 | Kenichi and Hattori's feminine look! (Hattori and Kenichi as Zulu and Monu) (くの一変身はこりごりでござるの巻) | Kenichi gets upset on seeing people being biased between boys and girls. So, Hattori uses a look-changing ninja table and turns Kenichi and himself into girls. However, they are embarrassed at a spa. |
| 471 | Growing oranges! (The sweet oranges) (早く芽を出せ柿の種の巻) | Kio fools Shishimaru by giving him an orange peel to grow oranges. So, Hattori makes an artificial plant out of a cloth along with artificial fruits and fools Kio and Kemumaki. |
| 472 | Hattori wets the bed! (Hattori repens for his mistake) (拙者だって子供でござるの巻) | Hattori urinates in his pants and wets the bed. But as he feels guilty for what he has done, he decides to be silent for some time as part of his repentance. However, Kemumaki's technique makes him confess the truth. |
| 473 | Kenichi restricts Hattori's ninja techniques! (Physical examination at Kenichi's school) (忍法使わぬは苦しいでござるの巻) | Kenichi challenges Hattori to perform his daily activities without using the ninja techniques. The next morning, Kenichi forgets to wear his underwear to school but Hattori helps Kenichi using a ninja technique. |
| 474 | Shinzo at the kindergarten! (Shinzo goes to kindergarten) (シンゾウ幼稚園へ行くの巻) | Kenichi, Shinzo, Kemumaki and Yumeko go to the nursery school to play with the kids. Shinzo notices fire flaring up and uses water balloons to extinguish the fire with Hattori's help. |
| 475 | A flying technique! (I challenge a bird to a ninja technique) (忍法飛ぶ鳥に挑戦するでござるの巻) | Kio lies to Hattori that Kemumaki can fly better. So, Hattori does a research on the flying techniques of birds. He uses Shishimaru and the projector's help and proves to others that he can fly. |
| 476 | Hattori's new shoes! (Hattori got shoes) (クツをはいたハットリくんの巻) | Kemumaki gets a new pair of shoes for Hattori, but the shoes shrink and Hattori gets blisters on his feet. During a skipping race challenge with Kemumaki, Hattori wears the same shoes but without the sole. |
| 477 | Like fast and cold (Hattori's speed) (はやきこと風の如しの巻) | Kemumaki challenges Hattori's speed by calling him and asking him to come to different places. So, Hattori makes the bird speak in his tone and follows Kemumaki as a shadow to win the challenge. |
| 478 | Impressing the teacher! (Please bring the teacher) (秘伝！忍法先読みの術の巻) | Kenichi, Hattori, and Kemumaki, try to impress the teacher for good marks by giving him things that he may require. And when the teacher gets injured, the same things come in use. |
| 479 | Kenichi spies on his mom! (Kenichi becomes a spy) (ケン一氏、お小言に反撃！の巻) | Hattori finds Kenichi's personal diary and gets to know that Kenichi is spying on Ama to find a fault in her. Hattori doesn't let Kenichi succeed in his plan. He proves Ama right and Kenichi wrong. |
| 480 | Kio's learns about his static energy! (Kiyo gets a new power) (必殺！忍法エレキャットは手ごわいぞの巻) | Kenichi rubs a glass against Kiyo's body and creates a static energy. Kiyo uses that energy to fight Shishimaru and Hattori. Shinzo's cry, Shishimaru's fireball, and Kiyo's static energy create a blast. |
| 481 | Puzzle games! (Hattori solves a puzzle) (ジグソーパズルで大さわぎの巻) | Kemumaki challenges Hattori to solve a puzzle. However, Hattori solves the puzzle easily. And later, he realizes it was a frog pictured puzzle and gets petrified. And he tears Kemumaki's clothes. |
| 482 | Battling in the air! (Kenichi learns magic) (ハットリ、ケムマキ空中戦の巻) | Kemumaki discloses Kenichi's marks in front of Yumeko and embarrasses him. Later, Kemumaki and Hattori get into a fight on a string of a kite. But they compromise and land on a tree using the kite technique. |
| 483 | The ninja flying cotton! (Don't believe your enemies) (忍法飛び雲に挑戦するでござるの巻) | Hattori receives a box of cotton from his Iga town. He stuffs the cotton in a cloth and tries to fly with it. But he fails at it. Then, Kemumaki uses a ninja technique to send Hattori away with the cotton. |
| 484 | Anger suppressing bag! (The magical envelope) (忍法堪忍袋!?の巻) | Hattori asks Kenichi to speak in an envelope to vent his anger. Kemumaki vents out his anger for Hattori, Shinzo, Shishimaru and the people of Iga town in the envelope. |
| 485 | A motorcycle! (The motorcycle race) (機械馬で勝負するでござるの巻) | Hattori creates a bike for Kenichi with Shishimaru as the engine, while Kemumaki creates a bike for himself making Kio run the wheel. But they fight and damage Koike-Sensei's bike. |
| 486 | Endurance contest! (The heated competition) (夏だ、あつさだ、がまん大会の巻) | Kenichi and Kemumaki take part in a competition of sitting for a longer time in the heat. Kemumaki plays his tricks and tries to be cool even in the heat. But Kenichi almost gives up. So, Hattori plays the same trick on Kemumaki. |
| 487 | The man-made hell! (Hattori and Guys go to hell) (忍法地獄へ一度はおいでの巻) | Kemumaki and Kio trap Kenichi and the others into a cave and make them believe that they are dead and have reached hell. On knowing the truth, Hattori makes Kemumaki and Kio work in the man-made hell as demons as a punishment. |
| 488 | Ninja sign language! (Kenichi learns expressions) (忍法人文字作戦大成功の巻) | Hattori teaches Kenichi the sign languages. Then, Hattori, Shinzo, and Shishimaru use the sign language to help Kenichi recite his dialogues when he performs a play with Yumeko. |
| 489 | The baseball challenge! (Kenichi becomes a baseball player) (ケン一氏の予告ホームランの巻) | Kemumaki challenges Kenichi in a baseball match and plays his tricks to make Kenichi lose the match. However, Hattori disrupts Kemumaki's technique and makes it easy for Kenichi to score a homerun. |
| 490 | The love and hatred technique! (Sometimes friendship can be a bit troublesome) (忍法恋のとりこには参ったでござるの巻) | Sonam uses a technique to make Hattori fall in love with her. So, Kemumaki uses a hatred mixture to create hatred in everyone's heart for Hattori. |
| 491 | Bonu is hypnotized! (Hattori's New Friend) (トゲ次郎がやってきたでござるの巻（パートI）) | Hattori's uncle hands over a magical cactus to Hattori named Bonu. Kemumaki and Kiyo take advantage of Bonu and hypnotize it to do as they say. They send Bonu with Hattori and his friends to trouble them. |
| 492 | Mischievous Bonu! (Cacto-chan meets the family) (トゲ次郎がやってきたでござるの巻（パートII）) | Bonu troubles everyone in the house after coming home. Hattori gets to know that Bonu is under Kemumaki and Kiyo's influence. And so, he uses water to scare Bonu and get him against Kemumaki and Kiyo. |

=== Season 3 ===
| Japanese EP# | Title | Synopsis |
|---|---|---|
| 494 | Shishimaru lives a lavish life (Shishimaru lives a king's life for a day) (獅子丸の一日王子様気分でござるの巻) | Shishimaru takes the place of a pet dog and lives a lavish life. He regrets when the master shaves Shishimaru's hair. |
| 495 | Superpowered dog (A ninja dog too has supernatural power) (犬もおだてりゃ超能力?!の巻) | As Shishimaru's feels unattended, Hattori works up a plan and makes Shishimaru show his supernatural powers through ninja techniques. |
| 496 | Kio as Kiochan (Does Kio-chan have a rival?) (トゲ次郎にライバルあらわる?!の巻) | Kemumaki introduces Kio as Kio-chan, the cactus. When Kemumaki forces Kio to generate electricity, Kio passes current over Yumeko and Kemumaki. |
| 497 | Flower gift (Strategy of Ninja flower gift) (忍者花プレゼント作戦の巻) | Kemumaki changes the flower pot that was given by Yumeko to Kenichi. As the grass spreads in the house, Hattori takes revenge from Kemumaki. |
| 498 | Shishimaru attacks Hattori (Beaten up by the fireball power) (火の玉パワーにはまいったでござるの巻) | Kemumaki takes advantage of Shishimaru, and sends Shishimaru and Kio to attack Hattori. Hattori uses ninja techniques to fight them. |
| 499 | Cactus meal (A cactus food creates a commotion) (人騒がせなトゲトゲ料理の巻) | On knowing that cactus is an edible plant, Kio gets anxious to eat Cactochan. So, Hattori uses a ninja technique to distract him. |
| 500 | Hattori saves Kemumaki (Run Kio Run) (走れ！影千代の巻) | In spite of Kemumaki's refusal, Hattori uses his ninja technique and saves Kemumaki from being hurt on a trek. |
| 501 | Kemumaki trains a dog (Koga Ninja's New Disciple) (甲賀忍者の新弟子は？の巻) | Kemumaki trains a dog to impress Yumeko, and forgets Kio. So Hattori sets a plan to make Kemumaki realize Kio's value. |
| 502 | Folk dance competition (Folk Dance Competition) (フォークダンスで恋合戦の巻) | Kemumaki and Kio set a plan against Kenichi so that he doesn't get a chance to dance with Yumeko. When Hattori gets to know, he teaches Kemumaki a lesson. |
| 503 | The Ninja golf tournament (Ninja Technique of Golf Match) (忍法ゴルフ合戦でござるの巻) | Kemumaki and Hattori play a golf match. While playing tricks against Hattori, Kio puts Hattori and Kemumaki in trouble. |
| 504 | Secret neckerchief (The secret scarf) (秘密のネッカチーフの巻) | As Kio loses his scarf, he gets scared of height. Hattori does a mono acting to get rid of Kio's fear and returns the scarf to Kio. |
| 505 | Fun playing domino (Ninja technique of domino is really fun) (忍法ドミノは楽しゅうござるの巻) | Hattori cuts the wood of a tree and sets up a domino game. The kids wake up in the morning and feel happy on seeing an innovative domino game. |
| 506 | The Ninja chameleon (Ninja technique of chameleon was a big flop) (忍法カメレオン変化には参ったでござるの巻) | Hattori takes a chameleon's look. He tries hard to hide himself, but Yumeko gets to know the truth about him. |
| 507 | Traditional Ninja Cuisine (Ninja traditional tastes really a teral) (伝統の味はつらいでござるの巻) | Hattori prepares the traditional ninja cuisine, but dislikes its taste. He pretends to eat the ninja food. But later, eats Ama's cooked food. |
| 508 | Hattori gets a cavity (Ninja too can have a cavity) (忍者もまいった虫歯でござるの巻) | Hattori suffers from toothache due to a cavity. So, Kemumaki takes the doctor's look and troubles him. Later, Hattori's tooth gets extracted. |
| 509 | Chinese acupuncture (Ninja technique of Chinese acupuncture) (漢方忍法ツボ打ち返し！の巻) | Hattori's instructor visits Hattori and takes acupuncture treatment from him. Later, the instructor teaches Hattori a technique to stay alert. |
| 510 | The ninja heating technique (Ninja technique of Kio's electric kotatsu) (影千代忍法電気コタツの巻) | As Kio and Kenichi get stranded in the snow, they generate heat by using ninja technique to feel the warmth. |
| 511 | The predicting cactus (There's something coming to the town) (何かが町にやってくるの巻) | Cactochan predicts a disaster, so Hattori and his friends dig a place to be safe. But later, they realize that there is nothing to worry. |
| 512 | The ninja battle (The new ninja technique) (新忍法の道けわしの巻) | Hattori and Kemumaki get into a battle with each other. As Kemumaki attacks Kenichi, Hattori takes revenge from Kemumaki and wins the battle. |
| 513 | Shishimaru's howling (A change in the ninja howling) (忍法遠吠え大逆転!!の巻) | Hattori digs a hole, so that Shishimaru can how underground. Kio creates howling sounds. But Hattori gets him caught. |
| 514 | Kentaru and Koike-Sensei's tiff (How did it all begin) (それはマッタで始まった!?の巻) | Kentaru and Koike-Sensei argue with each other on a chess match. They continue arguing even at school. But later, all the issues get resolved. |
| 515 | The ninja photograph (Ninja technique of photography) (特撮忍法合戦でござるの巻) | Kemumaki creates a setup to scare Hattori and his friends. Hattori takes revenge from Kemumaki. And Kenichi gets a good click. |
| 516 | A Ninja sleeps anywhere, anytime (Ninja technique of sleeping anywhere at any time) (忍法いつでもどこでも寝る方法の巻) | Hattori practices the technique of sleeping at different places. He executes the idea of sleeping underwater by putting the birds to sleep. |
| 517 | Hibernating (Ninja technique of hibernating needs cold climate) (冬眠忍法は風邪のもとでござるの巻) | Kemumaki brings rice dumplings for Kenichi and his family so that they hibernate. But, Hattori hypnotises Kemumaki, and wakes his family. |
| 518 | No one can beat Hattori (No one can beat me, says Hattori) (拙者無敵のハットリでござるの巻) | Kemumaki, Kenichi and his friends plan against Hattori to defeat him. Hattori ends up losing the challenge due a cactus. |
| 520 | Kenichi stays alone (Kenichi's declaration of independence) (ケン一氏のとんだ独立宣言の巻) | As Kenichi gets upset, Hattori sets up a tree house for Kenichi to stay alone. As Kemumaki troubles Kenichi, Hattori teaches him a lesson. |
| 519 | Ninja on a holiday (The auspicious day has finally come) (四年に一度のニンニン記念日の巻) | Hattori takes an off to celebrate the ninja Iga gang anniversary. He goes out with Sonam to an amusement park to spend his holiday. |
| 521 | Understanding gestures (Ninja technique of reading gestures) (忍法しぐさ読みの巻) | Kenichi learns to read gestures like Hattori and Sonam. Kemumaki tricks Kenichi by taking Yumeko's look, but gets caught by Hattori. |
| 523 | Saving the doll (Mission of saving the doll) (お人形SOSの巻) | Kenichi breaks Yumeko's doll. Hattori sticks the doll back. While showing the doll to Yumeko, Kemumaki trips and breaks the doll. |
| 522 | The ninja teleportation (Ninja technique of teleportation) (忍法テレポーテーションでござるの巻) | Kenichi tries teleportation to reach school on time. As it fails to help, Hattori uses a spring board technique to help Kenichi. |
| 524 | Old tomb trouble (Commotion at the game) (とんだ古墳騒動の巻) | Kenichi, Shinzo and Shishimaru find an ancient tomb, faked by Kemumaki. Then, Hattori applies the same tricks over Kemumaki. |
| 525 | Ninja video technique (Ninja technique of using video and the problems it creates) (忍法ビデオ操りにはご用心の巻) | Hattori uses a ninja technique and records a video in Kenichi's mind, so that he increases his speed. Kemumaki misuses the ninja technique. |
| 526 | An alien's visit (Space alien loves fish sausages) (宇宙人はチクワがお好きの巻) | Kenichi, Shinzo and Shishimaru assume Kio to be an alien. Hattori gets to know about Kemumaki's plan and scares him by acting as an alien. |
| 527 | Kio's supplies electricity (Kio Electric Supply Company Ltd.) (影千代電力株式会社の巻) | Kemumaki uses Kio to supply electricity to people in exchange for gifts. Kio seeks help from Hattori and makes Kemumaki realise his mistake. |
| 528 | Judo match (Ninja technique of Judo) (忍法柔道は重労働でござるの巻) | Kemumaki and Kenichi fight a judo match. At the end, Hattori tries to save Yumeko from Kemumaki, but ends up putting himself in trouble. |
| 529 | Shishimaru's multiple ninja technique (Shishimaru's branch new technique was a big cals) (忍法獅子丸分身で大騒ぎの巻) | Shishimaru bribes Kio to help him and performs multiple ninja technique with him. But Kemumaki and Hattori get to know the truth. |
| 530 | Cactochan's farewell (Hey Cacto-chan, return to the woods) (トゲ次郎よ野性に返れ！の巻) | Kemumaki send Cactochan back to the woods after he gets a bad dream. But Hattori gets it back and sets a trap for Kemumaki to teach him a lesson. |
| 531 | The ninja canon (A new ninja technique, the spirited canon bounce) (新忍法気合い砲でドカン！の巻) | Hattori learns the spirited canon technique. The regular use of the technique makes Hattori lose his ability to speak. |
| 532 | Fear of round objects (Ninja beware of round objects technique) (忍法神かくしはこわいでござるの巻) | Hattori learns the ninja beware of round objects technique. To teach Kemumaki a lesson, Hattori makes him fear round objects. |
| 533 | Mama is a Super Kunoichi (Mom is super cool) (ママ上はスーパーくの一でござるの巻) | Ama learns ninja techniques. She performs the wall breaking ninja technique and shocks everyone. |
| 534 | Kenichi's foot tapping habit (Jiggling needs can be cured) (貧乏ゆすりをなおすでござるの巻) | Kemumaki takes advantage of Kenichi's foot tapping habit and blames him for everything. So, Hattori teaches Kemumaki a lesson. |
| 535 | Cacto-chan's thoughts (Cacto-chan's supernatural powers) (トゲ次郎の超能力テレビの巻) | Hattori receives a device to know about Cactochan's thoughts. As Hattori loses his scroll, Cactochan helps Hattori find it. |
| 536 | Scared of Kenichi's 100 score (Kenichi first score is quite steady) (ケン一氏の百点はこわいでござるの巻) | Hattori, Shinzo and Shishimaru fulfil their promise of changing their habits as Kenichi scores 100 marks. Later, they get to know that Kemumaki had changed the test paper. |
| 537 | Alter ego (Mirror were terror) (分身の恐怖でござるの巻) | Kemumaki reads about the alter ego technique. He gets scared and runs away when he sees Hattori as his duplicate. |
| 538 | Drying the mattress (Dry the blankets on a clear morning) (晴れた朝には布団干しの巻) | Ama puts Kenichi's mattress to dry. But due to rain, Kenichi's mattress gets wet. And Ama scolds Hattori for it. |
| 539 | Room painting (Hard pounds, because of ninja renovations) (忍法模様がえで心うきうきの巻) | Kemumaki changes Kenichi's room colour to scare Yumeko. So, Hattori makes Kio paint black colour in Kemumaki's room to teach him a lesson. |
| 540 | Use of pressure points (A unique ninja pressure point technique) (忍法ツボ打ちでどうにも止まらないの巻) | Kemumaki uses a pressure point technique and makes Kenichi do Yumeko's work. Hattori uses the same technique over him. |
| 541 | Kemumaki shaves Kio (Kagechiyo turns numb) (影千代涙のエレキャットの巻) | As Kio falls sick, Hattori makes Kemumaki shave Kio's hair. After few days, Kio and Kemumaki feel grateful to Hattori for solving the problem. |
| 542 | Ninja bright eye strategy (Make big eyes with a ninja technique) (忍法お目々パッチリ作戦でござるの巻) | As Yumeko loves big and bright eyes, Hattori helps Kenichi by using a ninja technique. Kemumaki and Yumeko get shocked. |
| 544 | Sumo wrestling match (A memorable sumo wrestling match) (忍法猪突猛進でイッキ押しの巻) | Hattori helps Kenichi win the sumo wrestling match against Kemumaki by focusing Kenichi's attention on red colour. |
| 545 | Hattori blushes (Why did I blush?) (拙者が赤くなったわけの巻) | Hattori meets a lady and her daughter and blushes. Sonam gets worried with Hattori's expressions. Later, Hattori reveals that the lady reminded him of his mother. |
| 543 | Throwing ninja technique (Shinzo's throwing episode) (シンゾウ投げてんまつ記の巻) | As Shinzo finds himself to be greater than others, Hattori teaches him a lesson. He makes him realize that one shouldn't keep ego. |
| 546 | The ants and grasshopper story (Fight between ants and grasshoppers) (アリとキリギリス作戦の巻) | Hattori and his friends imagine enacting ants, while Kemumaki imagines to be a grasshopper in a story. Hattori gives a message on the life of ants. |
| 547 | Kemumaki feels humiliated (Where is the manly Kemumaki going?) (男ケムマキどこへ行くの巻) | Yumeko scolds Kemumaki for trying her dress. After Koike-Sensei consoles Kemumaki, Yumeko and Kemumaki apologize to each other. |
| 548 | Kemumaki learns to be patient (Patience patience, the new ninja technique) (ガマンガマンの新忍法の巻) | So as to open a ninja box, Kemumaki tries the ninja technique of being calm and patient. Yet he fails to open the box. Later, Hattori opens the box for him. |
| 549 | Waking Koike-Sensei (Teacher can't get up early) (先生氏は朝が苦手でござるの巻) | Kemumaki takes the look of Koike-Sensei in order to ruin Hattori's plan of waking Koike-Sensei early. But Hattori makes Kemumaki confess the truth. |
| 550 | Hattori's speed (Wow! What an amazing speed!) (目にもとまらぬ早技なんての巻) | Hattori learns the new ninja technique of increasing speed and surprises everyone with his speed. |
| 551 | Kemumaki's truth (The adorable Koga ninja) (あこがれの甲賀忍者の巻) | While Kemumaki tries hard to reveal the truth of him being a koga ninja to Yumeko, Hattori and his friends do the opposite. |
| 552 | The memorising ninja technique (Ninja technique of memorizing skills) (忍法印象記憶術の巻) | Hattori teaches Kenichi a technique of memorising. Though Kenichi prepares himself for the exam, he forgets the answers. |
| 553 | Speak the truth (Kenichi the pickpocket) (ネコババはいかんでござるの巻) | Kenichi finds a purse with Rs 1000 in it and buys a scarf. On knowing that it belongs to Yumeko, Kenichi gifts Yumeko the scarf and tells her the truth. |
| 554 | Long-awaited udon (The long-awaited shinobi udon) (がまんがまんの忍びうどんの巻) | Sonam makes the family wait for 3 hours to eat shinobi udon. After 3 hours, Sonam presents the dish to them, and they relish it. |
| 555 | All-time favourite bicycle (Kenichi's all cycle) (古い自転車も大切にの巻) | After Kenichi, Shinzo and Shishimaru get rid of the old cycle, Hattori scares them with a puppet show of the cycle to make them realize their mistake. |
| 556 | Kemumaki as Ama (Kemumaki mamas duplicate) (ニセママ上、怪奇大作戦の巻) | Kemumaki takes the look of Ama to scare Kenichi and his friends. But instead, Kenichi and his friends scare Kemumaki. |
| 557 | Classic photography (The photographic contest) (アクションカメラは任せるでござるの巻) | Kemumaki ruins Kenichi and Hattori's efforts of clicking pictures. So, Hattori uses ninja techniques and spoils Kemumaki's pictures. |
| 558 | Hattori, a mother (Hattori, the mother of the newborn) (卵の親は拙者でござるの巻) | Hattori takes care of a pigeon as a mother would. Later, Hattori and his friends feel very happy to see the squab come out of a shell. |
| 559 | Shishimaru takes over (Frenzy of shadow casting ninja technique) (忍法影武者で大さわぎの巻) | Hattori gets rashes on his face, so he goes to Iga mountain to get treated. He hands over his responsibilities to Shishimaru. |
| 560 | Mask effect (Kemumaki disguises as Hattori) (いたずらは自分の顔での巻) | Kemumaki takes the look of Hattori and troubles everyone. So, Hattori pastes a mask on Kemumaki's face to teach him a lesson. |
| 561 | Change in personality (The split personality) (忍法疑心暗鬼にご用心の巻) | On Kenichi's insistence, Hattori uses a magical mirror to change his personality. Kemumaki also uses the mirror and changes his personality. |
| 562 | Telegram quiz ninja technique (Successful strategy of an escape) (逃げ遅れ必勝作戦の巻) | As Kemumaki puts the blame on Kenichi for his wrongdoing, Hattori helps Kenichi by spreading a rumour so that Kemumaki confesses his mistake. |
| 563 | Ninja technique to escape (Ninja technique of escaping) (これぞ拙者の脱出忍法！の巻) | Kemumaki challenges Hattori to free himself from a box. Hattori smartly uses ninja techniques and wins the challenge. |
| 564 | Kenichi's inventions (Kenichi's inventions goes for a toss) (発明の道はきびしいでござるの巻) | Kenichi comes up with inventions and tries them on Kemumaki. While experimenting, a blast takes place because of Hattori's bombs. |
| 565 | Shaping up (Mom becomes figure conscious) (シェイプアップは命がけ！の巻) | Ama begins dieting in order to look smart. After Hattori uses ninja technique to make Ama realize that she is thin, Ama starts eating a lot of food. |
| 566 | Kenichi's big brother (Elder brother Kentaro) (兄貴、ケンタロー!?の巻) | Kenichi's family members compare Kenichi to Kemumaki, dressed as Kentaro, to change his mind of having an elder brother. |
| 567 | Kio's spying habit (Kio takes a spy challenge) (影千代のスパイ大作戦の巻) | As Kio has a habit of spying, Hattori and his friends spread a rumor about Yumeko. As a result, Kemumaki gets a slap from Yumeko. |
| 568 | Signal fire ninja technique (Signal fire ninja technique in clear blue sky) (青空でっかく忍法のろしの巻) | While Hattori send messages to Yumeko about Pipi using the signal fire ninja technique, Kemumaki and Kio intervene but fail to succeed. |
| 569 | Being a pet (Is it pleasant to be pet?) (ペットは楽し？の巻) | Yumeko wishes to have a pet dog. So, Kemumaki changes his look into a pet dog and goes to Yumeko's house and refuses to leave her. |
| 570 | Kenichi's forgetful nature (Carry your forgotten thing for yourself) (忘れものは自分で届く？の巻) | Hattori promises Ama that he will not help Kenichi. However, Hattori fails to control himself and uses a technique to help Kenichi. |
| 571 | Snake and ladder game (Going on date is no easy game) (デートはサイコロ勝負!?の巻) | Hattori creates notes of activities to be performed in a game. As Kemumaki and Kio mess with the game, Hattori puts Kemumaki in trouble. |
| 572 | Being a Ninja cat is difficult (It's quite difficult to be a ninja cat) (忍者猫は厳しいでござるの巻) | Kemumaki scolds Kio as he wishes to live a life like other cats. Later, Kemumaki and Kio realize their love for each other. |
| 573 | A cloud ride (On the clouds because of Iga-ninja technique) (伊賀忍法で雲の上の巻) | Kemumaki hypnotizes Yumeko and takes her look to go on a cloud ride. On knowing the truth, Hattori pushes Kemumaki off the cloud. |
| 574 | Hattori dislikes the train (Trains make me slightly uncomfortable) (電車はちょっぴり苦手でござるの巻) | Hattori helps other passengers find their ticket. Hattori fails to stop thinking about other passenger's tickets and misses his stop. |
| 575 | Hattori's secret hideout (Let's search the hiding place) (すてきなかくれ家を見つけちゃおうの巻) | Kenichi and his friends use a ninja map to find out about Hattori's hideouts. However, Hattori uses cardboard boxes as a hideout. |
| 576 | Yumeko's ring (Strategy for replacing the ice making) (氷の彫刻すりかえ作戦の巻) | Yumeko's ring gets stuck in a sculpture created by Koike-Sensei. So, Hattori uses his ninja Iga technique and exchanges the idols. |
| 577 | Hattori hates wasting food (Hattori doesn't like to waste food) (据え膳食わぬは忍者の恥の巻) | Kemumaki changes his look to feed Hattori snacks so that he gets overweight. However, Hattori learns about Kemumaki's plan and fools him. |
| 578 | Stinking punishment (A stinking punishment) (お仕置はちょっぴりクサイでござるの巻) | Kemumaki takes advantage of the parachute made by Hattori. So, Hattori uses a ninja technique and drops garlic paste on Kemumaki. |
| 579 | Shishimaru, the elite ninja dog (Shishimaru and elite ninja dog) (獅子丸はエリート忍者犬でござるの巻) | Kemumaki takes advantage of Shishimaru on knowing that he belongs to a rich ninja family. But, Hattori makes Shishimaru realize his ninja dog power. |
| 580 | Kemumaki makes Ama his mother (Kenichi's mom becomes Kemumaki's mother) (盗まれたママ上の巻) | Kemumaki uses a ninja technique to make Ama his mother. But, after the hypnotizing power fails, Ama disowns Kemumaki and leaves. |
| 581 | A courageous proposal (Teacher proposes to Aiko teacher) (男度胸のプロポーズでござるの巻) | Koike-Sensei takes help from Hattori to propose Aiko-Sensei. In spite of being afraid, Koike-Sensei expresses his feelings to her. |
| 582 | Twisted Ninja technique (Can Kemumaki ever defeat Hattori?) (ケムマキ氏は拙者を超えた!?の巻) | Kemumaki practices the twisted ninja technique and plays pranks. In spite of a good speed, Kemumaki fails to win over Hattori. |
| 583 | Kenichi's girlfriend (Kenichi is in a soap) (人さわがせなくの一変身の巻) | Kemumaki takes the look of a girl to create a bad impression of Kenichi over Yumeko. However, Hattori puts a mask of an old lady on Kemumaki. |
| 584 | Kenichi's puppet (Can you rely on a puppet doll?) (身代わりは人形にまかせるでござるの巻) | Hattori creates a puppet of Kenichi and uses it to fool Ama and Kentaru. However, he gets caught. |
| 585 | A sleepover (An enjoyable and balancing overnight stay) (嬉し恥ずかしお泊りでござるの巻) | When Kenichi goes to Yumeko's house for a sleepover, Kemumaki plays his tricks over Kenichi. So Hattori uses a technique so that Kemumaki gets a beating from all the girls. |
| 586 | Ninja technique of hearts eye (Ninja has completely heart eye technique) (忍法心の眼は真暗闇でござるの巻) | While Hattori practices a ninja technique of hearts eye, Kemumaki attacks him. Then, Hattori uses honey to attack Kemumaki. |
| 587 | Will Hattori return to Iga? (Kenichi's ninja technique of persuasion) (ケン一忍法おがみたおしの巻) | As Kemumaki uses Kenichi to convince Hattori to return to Iga, Hattori blackmails Kemumaki emotionally. Then, Kemumaki and Kio convince Hattori to stay back. |
| 588 | Kenichi's birthday gift (Birthday present by lottery picking) (プレゼントくじは忍法へび縄での巻) | Kemumaki plays a trick to avoid gifting Kenichi a remote controlled car for his birthday. But helps Kenichi get his birthday gift. |
| 589 | Kemumaki takes Kenichi's advantage (Ruining a true friendship) (熱い友情の証でござるの巻) | Kemumaki takes advantage of Kenichi. So, Hattori invites Kemumaki home and troubles him while taking hot water bath. |
| 590 | Attacked by the bees (Ninja bee manipulation technique) (忍法ブンブンあやつりの巻) | Kemumaki uses a bee technique to hypnotize Hattori and send him back home. But unfortunately, Hattori gets back into his senses. |
| 591 | Sensational girl power (Ninja getting stumped with girl power) (忍法ギャルパワーにはお手上げでござるの巻) | While playing a tennis match, Kio invites few girls who drive Hattori crazy with the aroma of their bath soap. |
| 592 | Ninja thunder drum (Knocked off because of ninja lighting drum technique) (忍法雷太鼓には参ったでござるの巻) | Kemumaki sticks a skin on Hattori's navel to worry him. So, Hattori uses the ninja lightning drum technique and sticks artificial navels over Kemumaki's body. |
| 593 | Kenichi's hidden strength (Ninja horrifying technique) (忍法恐怖のパワーでござるの巻) | Hattori uses a ninja technique to bring out Kenichi's hidden strength while running a race. Yet, Kenichi loses the race. |
| 594 | Dad is great (Anyway, dad isn't he great) (何たってパパ上は偉いでござるの巻) | Kentaru feels unwanted and sad. So, Hattori uses ninja techniques to bring Kentaru in the limelight and make his family realize his importance. |
| 595 | A guest who hate dogs (The guest who hates dogs) (犬の嫌いなお客さまでござるの巻) | A young boy, who hates dogs, visits Hattori. So, Hattori uses his ninja technique to keep Shishimaru away from the boy. |
| 596 | Ama misses a daughter (Staying along at Tsubame for some time) (ついにツバメどのと同居でござる!?の巻) | Kemumaki hypnotizes Ama to stop Sonam from going home and dresses Kenichi, Shinzo and Shishimaru's like girls. So, Hattori dresses Kemumaki like a girl. |
| 597 | Yumeko wishes to fly (Be in trouble because of a flying broom) (空とぶホーキには参ったでござるの巻) | Hattori, Kemumaki, and Kio try various tricks to fulfill Yumeko's wish of flying with a stick broom. But Yumeko changes her wish. |
| 598 | Ninja sleeping technique (Kemumaki is a sleeping beauty) (ケムマキ氏は眠り姫でござるの巻) | Kemumaki fools Kenichi and his friends so as to go with Yumeko on a picnic alone. But, Hattori teaches Kemumaki a lesson. |
| 599 | A dodge ball (Ninja technique of playing dodge ball) (忍法鉄の水あやつりの巻) | Hattori creates a metal dodgeball to help Kenichi. Kemumaki gets to know and uses the ball against Kenichi. |
| 600 | Wind forest flower mountain technique (Ninja technique of wind forest flower mountain) (忍法風林火山でひかえめにの巻) | Kemumaki takes advantage of Kenichi when he uses the wind forest flower mountain technique. Then, Hattori uses the same technique over Kemumaki and Kio. |
| 601 | The beauty of fireflies (Ninja technique of fireflies) (忍法ホタル合戦の巻) | As Yumeko wishes to see fireflies, Hattori calls Sonam to invite fireflies by playing the flute. The beauty of the fireflies amazes everyone. |
| 602 | Mitsuba family's secret (The secret of the Mitsuba family) (三葉家の秘密でござるの巻) | Kemumaki gets a doubt that the Mitsuba family is a ninja, and confirms the same when Kentaru goes missing in a fraction of a second. |
| 603 | A ninja swap (Ninja technique of exchanging personalities) (忍法取りかえっこはもうこりごりの巻) | Kemumaki blackmails Hattori and switches roles. Hattori creates a bad impression of Kemumaki over other students in the school. |
| 604 | Flowers delivered on time (The flowers were delivered on time) (花は遅くなかったでござるの巻) | Kenichi promises Yumeko to bring flowers for her piano teacher at 4 pm. In spite of all the obstacles set by Kemumaki, Hattori reaches on time. |
| 605 | Shishimaru turns into a cute cat (Shishimaru becomes a cute cat) (忍法猫変身で大さわぎの巻) | As Kio wins a bumper prize of chocolate rolls, Shishimaru changes into a cute cat and eats Kio's chocolate rolls. |
| 606 | Super electrical cat (Super electric special) (スーパー・エレキャット・スペシャルの巻) | Few dogs attack Kio, so Shishimaru uses an empty can to generate static electricity in Kio. Together they manage to chase the dogs away. |
| 607 | Shinzo and Shishimaru's friendship (Shishimaru eats the eraser) (消しゴム食べた獅子丸は...の巻) | As Shinzo and Shishimaru refuse to stay together, Hattori leaves Shishimaru in a forest. But Shinzo brings him back home. |
| 608 | Delivering the cheer flag (Five minutes before the cheering event) (応援合戦五分前!!の巻) | Kenichi forgets the cheering flag at home. So, Hattori uses the ninja technique of wind carrier and delivers the flag to Kenichi. |
| 609 | Ninja technique of rabbit ears (Eyes to eyes, ears to ears) (目には目を、耳には耳をでござるの巻) | Kemumaki uses the ninja technique of rabbit ears against Hattori. Hence, Hattori uses the same technique and fools Kemumaki. |
| 610 | The animal language (Ninja technique of animal language) (忍法！吠えて一発早わかりの巻) | Hattori tries to talk to Yumeko's canary bird and dog poodle to stop them from arguing but fails as he doesn't know foreign languages. |
| 611 | Wisdom water (The Iga ninja technique of water of wisdom) (伊賀の知恵水!?の巻) | Hattori gives Kenichi a sleep control liquid to keep him awake. However, Kemumaki and Kio drink all of it and face trouble. |
| 612 | Meditating under water (Don't meddle in underwater meditation) (水中座禅に手をだすなの巻) | Kemumaki boasts about meditating under water. So, Hattori uses a ninja technique and embarrasses Kemumaki while Kemumaki meditates. |
| 613 | The horror photo (Leave the photography on me) (ホラー写真はおまかせでござるの巻) | Kemumaki adds horror effects with the intention of ruining Yumeko's pictures. Later, Hattori uses horror effects in Kemumaki's pictures and amaze everyone. |
| 614 | Kemumaki's secret technique (Kemumaki's ultimate secret technique of binding hands and legs) (ケムマキ秘伝究極の金縛りの巻) | Kemumaki tries the secret technique of binding hands and legs over Hattori. But the technique fails. However, Hattori pretends to be affected by it. |
| 615 | Sword fighting competition (When sword fighting become a trouble) (剣道はメンドウでござるの巻) | Kemumaki challenges Kenichi a sword fighting competition. Hattori uses the ninja star to help Kenichi win the game. |
| 616 | Mirrors reflect Kemumaki (Ninja technique of knowing everything without moving) (忍法居ながらにしておみとおし!?の巻) | As Kio spies on Hattori and his friends and tells Kemumaki all the news, Hattori places mirrors to reflect their actions. |
| 617 | The scroll (The event of not giving away the scroll) (巻き物には手を出すな!?の巻) | Hattori tries to get rid of a scroll. However, Shinzo and Shishimaru get hold of it and feel happy to see their progress report in it. |
| 618 | Kio's electric strategy (Sardines make the new ninja technique) (メザシは新忍法の素でござるの巻) | Kio gets together with the other cats and uses the ninja technique of electric dragon to pass electricity over Hattori and Kemumaki. |
| 619 | Fake photography technique (Fake ninja photography, say cheese) (忍法ニセ写真でハイ！ポーズの巻) | Kemumaki uses the ninja technique of fake photography on Yumeko and Hattori. Hence, Hattori uses the same technique to tease Kemumaki. |
| 620 | Kio breaks Kemumaki's statue (When Kio became our guest) (影千代はお客さまでござるの巻) | Hattori carves statues of Kenichi, Kemumaki, and Yumeko. Kio unknowingly breaks Kemumaki's statue instead of Yumeko. |
| 621 | Preventive injection (Waiting time for immunization) (待ちどおしい予防注射!?の巻) | Shinzo uses ninja techniques and tries to be saved from the injection. But Hattori forces him to take it. |
| 622 | Stacking up the books (The ninja technique of arranging books in the library) (図書の整理も忍法で!?の巻) | Hattori stacks the books with the help of the bookmarks on the shelf. But as the sun goes down, he realizes that the marks were a reflection of the opposite building. |
| 623 | Kenichi skates well (The coldest day is the perfect day for skating) (寒さいちばんスケート日和の巻) | Kenichi, Kemumaki, and Yumeko go for skating. As Kenichi doesn't know how to skate, Hattori uses magnets to control his movements. |
| 624 | Do not lie to your parents (When the ninja technique of lies began) (ウソつきは忍法の始まり!?の巻) | Kenichi takes help from Hattori to hide about his parents meet and holiday from his parents. But Kenichi's parents get to know the truth. |
| 625 | Hattori's faked illness (The time when Hattori fell sick) (仮病はつかれるでござるの巻) | Hattori pretends to be sick on Kenichi's insistence as Kenichi needed a book from Yumeko. But, Hattori seriously gets injured. |
| 626 | A handsome boy (The time when I became a handsome boy) (拙者がハンサム少年でござる!?の巻) | Yumeko falls in love with an unknown boy. Hattori tells Yumeko that he was the unknown boy, but Yumeko refuses to believe him. |
| 627 | Manipulating the crowd (Ninja technique of manipulating the crowd) (忍法おおぜいあやつりがえし!?の巻) | Hattori uses the ninja technique of manipulating the crowd in the zoo so that Kenichi is able to click a baby panda's picture. |
| 629 | Nose fight against the cat walk (Hattori Wins on cat walking with nose) (忍法猫歩きには鼻で勝負でござるの巻) | Hattori learns the ninja technique of smelling from Shishimaru, while Kemumaki learns the ninja cat walking technique from Kio. |
| 628 | Saving yourself (Let's grab the ninja technique) (みんなでつかもう忍法のコツ!?の巻) | Hattori practices the ninja technique of saving yourself. He sees a frog coming towards him and uses the technique to save himself. |
| 630 | Caught in the act (Should we tell lies?) (嘘か遠慮かイジワルか？の巻) | Kemumaki and Kio replace Cactochan's buzzer so as to not get caught while telling lies. But, Hattori makes a buzzer sound and gets Kemumaki caught. |
| 631 | Will Aiko-Sensei leave? (When Aiko teacher was leaving school) (愛子先生やめるでござるの巻) | Hattori stops Aiko-Sensei from discontinuing her job. But, Aiko-Sensei confesses that she is not leaving the school. |
| 632 | Cause of quarrel (When sleeplessness became the reason for a fight) (寝不足はケンカのもとでござるの巻) | As Yumeko wishes to write an article on ninja and boys, Kemumaki creates fights between Kenichi and Hattori. But Yumeko fails to watch them fight. |
| 633 | Sonam's changed look (When Hattori forecasted with his ninja technique) (ハットリ忍法お見通しの巻) | Hattori gets a doubt on Kenichi's actions. So, Hattori takes a doctor's look to know the truth, and gets to know that it is Sonam. |
| 634 | Father and son (Friendship cemented by chorus) (雨降って地固まるでござるの巻) | On father's visiting day, Kemumaki creates a fight between Kenichi and Kentaru. But Hattori makes them friends again. |
| 635 | Ninja treasure box (The ninja technique for the dreadful treasure chest) (忍法恐怖の玉手箱でござるの巻) | Hattori gets a box from his mother with a message requesting him, Shinzo and Shishimaru to come home. |
| 636 | The beauty salon (Lots of secrets in the beauty parlor) (美容院には秘密がいっぱいでござるの巻) | Kemumaki takes the look of Yumeko's beautician to fool Kenichi and Hattori. However, the hair spa machine ruins Kemumaki's hair style. |
| 637 | Hiding in the leaves (When the leaves float in the air) (忍法木の葉は風にのっての巻) | Kenichi uses the technique of hiding in the leaves to be saved from Ama. Kemumaki complains to Ama about Kenichi, but Hattori changes the situation. |
| 638 | Ama lives with Kemumaki (Recapture mom) (ママ上を取りかえせの巻) | Ama lives in Kemumaki's house for a day. As Hattori gets fed up doing the housework, he uses ninja technique and gets Ama back home. |
| 639 | Fasten Kio belt (Fasten and unfasten the Kio belt) (結んでひらいて影千代帯の巻) | Hattori and Kemumaki use Kio as Yumeko's belt. But as Kio runs away during the event, Hattori handles the situation using flowers. |
| 640 | PTA elections (Mom's wish to be a chairperson brings everyone in trouble) (会長フィーバーには困ったでござるの巻) | When Ama goes to file a nomination for the PTA elections, Hattori uses his shadow and directs her to the cleaning committee cabin. |
| 641 | Kio repays Hattori's favor (Hattori makes a hectic depaul) (てんやわんやの初舞台でござるの巻) | Kemumaki tries to spoil Hattori and Yumeko act by setting frogs on the stage. But Kio helps Hattori and repays his favor. |
| 642 | Kenichi, an elder brother (Kenichi becomes an elder brother) (ござるござるのケン一氏!?の巻) | Kenichi exchanges his role with Hattori to behave like an elder brother. But later realizes that it's difficult being an elder brother. |
| 643 | The macho man, Kenichi (Be macho man) (男をみがくでござるの巻) | As Kenichi acts like a macho man, Kemumaki uses a ninja technique against him. But, Hattori uses the technique against Kemumaki. |

=== Season 4 ===
| Japanese EP# | Title | Synopsis |
|---|---|---|
| 644 | Sketching the cherry blossoms (Sketching event at the event of spring) (春の終りの写生会の巻) | Kids were given a task to make a good painting. Kenichi falls asleep, so Hattori and others make a painting. Hattori and Kemumaki drop the paints on Kenichi's drawing of the cherry blossom tree and Sensei praises that drawing. Hattori punishes Kemumaki with tornado technique. |
| 645 | Yumeko's dream (Stealing someone's dream is quite a hard technique) (忍法夢盗みは至難の技でござるの巻) | On Kenichi's insistence, Hattori finds out about Yumeko's dream using a ninja technique. Then, Kenichi wins Yumeko's heart by telling her about her dream. |
| 646 | A call from the teacher (The teacher has called you) (先生がお呼びでござるの巻) | As Kemumaki flirts with Yumeko, Kenichi asks Hattori to call Kemumaki. Hattori calls Kemumaki in Koike-Sensei's tone and invites him to school. |
| 647 | A party on a ship (An invitation to a prosperous ship) (豪華客船にご招待の巻) | Kemumaki conspires against Kenichi to go to a ship party with Yumeko. So, Hattori changes the ticket and takes Kemumaki on a small boat for a ride. |
| 648 | Kenichi's ink impressions (Kenichi's collection of ink impression with the help of ninja technique) (コレクションは忍法拓本での巻) | Kemumaki lies to the teacher that Kenichi collects ink impressions. So, Hattori, Shishimaru, and Shinzo print ink impressions on a bundle of papers. |
| 649 | A day of petting a cat (A lucky day in a cat's life) (とんだ猫かわいがりの日の巻) | On Kenichi's insistence, Shishimaru changes his look and meets Yumeko's aunty to impress her. |
| 650 | Fish ink impression! (Fish, fish, ink impression of a fish) (ぎょぎょぎょの魚拓でござるの巻) | Kemumaki uses the printer to make the size of the fish look big. So, Hattori uses the projector to adjust the size of the fish. |
| 651 | Kenichi strikes a goal! (What a nice shot with Shishimaru as a ball) (忍法獅子丸ボールでナイスシュートの巻) | Kio gives an electric shock to a ball assuming it is Shishimaru. But they get to know that Hattori had used a ninja technique and exchanged the ball. |
| 652 | Yumeko's curry party! (The ninja face masker covers the mind) (忍法仮面心かくしの巻) | Hattori gives Kenichi a smiling mask to wear. But Kenichi fails to keep smiling after eating Yumeko's spicy curry. |
| 653 | Kemumaki gets the work done (I will take care of dad's bag) (パパ上の鞄お守りするでござるの巻) | Kentaru gives Shinzo his old office bag and realizes later that his important file is in the bag. Kemumaki takes the bag from Shinzo and helps Kentaru. |
| 654 | Kemumaki pretends to be a normal boy (Is Kemumaki like any other boy?) (ケムマキ氏は普通の男の子!?の巻) | Hattori teaches ninja techniques to the students and asks Kemumaki to act as a normal boy. |
| 655 | Shishimaru's panda look (The secret behind Shishimaru's birth) (獅子丸出生の秘密の巻) | Shishimaru takes the look of a panda to get attention. So, Hattori changes his look and traps Shishimaru in a cage so that he doesn't cross his limit. |
| 656 | Photographer Ninja Hattori! (Great human cry over aerial photography) (航空写真で大さわぎの巻) | Hattori, Shinzo and Shishimaru click pictures using the ninja technique. Kemumaki and Kio try hard to distract them but fails at it. |
| 657 | Shishimaru and Kio's fight! (Even Shishimaru knows the new ninja technique) (獅子丸だって新忍法の巻) | Kio challenges Shishimaru for a fight. Hattori supports Kio instead of Shishimaru and illuminates the anger within him. |
| 658 | Improving the body posture (Special training for Kenichi) (秘伝！驚異の手裏剣投げでござるの巻) | Hattori trains Kenichi's to use the ninja star throwing technique and makes him wear a spring plaster to improve his posture. But Kemumaki steals it. |
| 659 | Kenichi walks like a cat (Kenichi transforms into a cat ) (ケン一氏の猫変身？の巻) | Kenichi walks like a cat to get rid of his fear and to have a clear vision of what is ahead in the dark. |
| 660 | Kenichi is too lazy (Kenichi has become a lazy bum) (ケン一氏の尻重すぎるでござるの巻) | Hattori gives Kenichi a ninja short pant to get rid of his laziness. But as he doesn't improve, Hattori ties him to an artificial cloud and leaves him in the air. |
| 661 | The Koga goldfish! (Ninkin the Koga goldfish) (忍者金魚は甲賀印の巻) | Kemumaki gets a Koga ninja fish at home to spy on Hattori. But Hattori saves the fish and Kemumaki using a technique. |
| 662 | How about underwater photography? (Underwater photography!) (水中写真はいかがでござるの巻) | Kemumaki challenges Kenichi to click pictures of Yumeko in the water. So, Hattori and Kenichi use an Iga submarine to enter the water. |
| 663 | Jippo meets Hattori! (Jippo finally finds Hattori) (ジッポーがやってきたでござるの巻) | A ninja monster named Jippo comes to meet Hattori but scares everyone. Then, Hattori brings Jippo home for few days. |
| 664 | Ninja technique of making burgers (Ninja technique of making hamburger) (忍法ハンバーガーを召し上がれの巻) | Hattori works at an eatery and impresses everyone with his skills. Kemumaki plays his tricks over Hattori. But Hattori performs his job well. |
| 665 | Travelling to the Caribbean Island (Caribbean tour in Jippo's balloon) (ジッポー気球でカリブ旅行の巻) | Kenichi wishes to go to the Caribbean Island. So, Jippo ties himself to a parachute and flies across the sea with his friends. |
| 666 | Jippo's social service (Jippo, a good housekeeper) (家事はおまかせジッポーでござるの巻) | As the teacher has fever, Jippo turns the teacher and his room into ice. Hattori gives Jippo chili biscuits and stabilizes the teacher health. |
| 667 | Jippo guards Yumeko's house (Jippo, the butchman) (ジッポーは名番犬？でござるの巻) | Jippo guards Yumeko's house for a night. Kio and Kemumaki try hard to disturb Yumeko and put the blame on Jippo but it fails. |
| 668 | Balancing in the air! (Story of ninja technique on holding with flying) (忍法空中停止飛行でござるの巻) | Hattori learns the technique of balancing in the air and helps Kenichi click pictures of a bird feeding her children. |
| 669 | The fight for the scroll! (The story of three ninja who came down) (三匹の忍者あらわれるの巻) | Sarosuke, Shaizo and Gosuke try to steal a scroll in order to pass the ninja school. But Hattori grabs the scroll before them. |
| 670 | Jippo turns into a rolling ball! (Story of Jippo's reckless rock wheel) (暴走ジッポー岩車輪の巻) | Jippo turns into a rolling ball to help Kemumaki win a rolling ball match. Hattori, Shinzo and Shishimaru stop Jippo, but break Kenichi's ball. |
| 671 | Turning the mats! (Sorry of the village at mat flip program) (忍法畳返しで仕返しでござるの巻) | Kemumaki and Kio make Hattori turn the mats of a judo school and take the credit for it. So, Hattori uses the same mats to fight Kemumaki and Kio. |
| 672 | Kenichi, the leader! (Group letter is also same like parents) (班長といえば親も同然の巻) | As Kenichi is appointed as the leader, he acts strict with the students. Kemumaki and the other students get angry on Kenichi. |
| 673 | Jippo's express delivery! (Human express with ninja technique) (忍法人間砲弾でござるの巻) | Jippo delivers Kenichi to school using the ninja technique of express delivery. Kemumaki plays his tricks but falls in his own trap. |
| 674 | Jippo's part-time jobs! (Leave the part-time job to Jippo) (アルバイトはジッポーにおまかせでござるの巻) | Kemumaki and Kenichi lie to Jippo and make him work at different places to earn money. |
| 675 | Finger hitting technique! (New ninja finger tapping technique) (新忍法指トントンの術でござるの巻) | Hattori, Shinzo, Shishimaru, and Jippo use the finger hitting technique and create sound waves, and demolish the cave that Kemumaki and Kio were sitting on. |
| 676 | Kemumaki's farewell! (Kemumaki's farewell anniversary) (ケムマキ氏のサラバ記念日の巻) | Kemumaki spreads a rumor that he is leaving the city. So, Hattori disguises himself and makes Kemumaki believe that everyone are aware of him being a Ninja. |
| 686 | Kenichi sleeps in school (Don't stay in the school) (学校に泊まってはいけないでござるの巻) | Kenichi, Shinzo, and Shishimaru sleep in the school in the night so that Kenichi doesn't get late for his class in the morning. |
| 687 | Sometime friends, sometime enemies (Shishimaru and Jippo battle it out) (二人はライバルでござるの巻) | Shishimaru and Jippo have a quarrel, which leads to a fight because of Kemumaki and Kio. But later, they become good friends. |
| 688 | Shinzo's survival training (Big human cry over ninja survival training) (忍法サバイバル修業で大さわぎの巻) | Hattori sends Shinzo alone to the forest for his survival training. Kemumaki and Kio try to distract Shinzo. But Shinzo never gives up. |
| 689 | Kenichi's scores 100 marks! (Ninja copy of sheet technique) (忍法ヤギのコピーでござるの巻) | Kenichi scores 100 marks in his maths test but Kemumaki makes a goat eat the test paper. So, Hattori writes a test for Kenichi and scores 100 marks for him. |
| 684 | Shishimaru finds Yumeko's book (Debut of Shishimaru's secret ninja technique) (初公開これぞ！獅子丸の（秘）忍法の巻) | Yumeko loses her book. So, Shishimaru sniff's Yumeko and finds her book with the help of the leonese ninja technique. |
| 685 | Kappa is surprised at Kappa (Searching for a sea urchin) (カッパがカッパにびっくり仰天の巻) | Kenichi sees Jippo in the lake and assumes it to be a sea urchin. Kenichi and his friends go in search of the sea urchin. |
| 683 | Is Hattori cheating? (Is Hattori a cheat?) (盗まれたハットリ忍法の巻) | Kemumaki and Kio think that Hattori has been cheating, so they challenge him to fight. But Hattori reveals that he fooled everyone. |
| 690 | Traditional vs. modern techniques! (Hattori's ninja mopping technique is really versatile) (てぬぐい忍法は万能でござるの巻) | Kemumaki challenges Hattori with his modern systems against the traditional cloth mop. But Hattori wins. |
| 691 | Shishimaru spins like a top! (Smiling and annoying and lot of fast) (怒って笑ってクルクルでござるの巻) | Shishimaru rotates like a top because of excessive training. But Jippo stops him by using his ninja technique. |
| 677 | Shinzo fears water! (Descending the waterfall brings in water phobia) (忍法滝くだりは水嫌いのもとの巻) | Shinzo develops a fear in his mind for water. So, Hattori pretends getting drowned and makes Shinzo save him. |
| 678 | Playing the flute to sleep (A hoop and a whole about the ninja sleeping tune) (忍法眠り笛で大さわぎの巻) | Kenichi learns the ninja technique of putting someone to sleep and tries it on Koike-Sensei. But as he fails at it, Sonam plays the flute. |
| 679 | Do not fear! (Find out sir's weak point) (先生の弱点をみつけたでござるの巻) | Kenichi clicks Koike-Sensei's frightened pictures. So, Hattori uses the ninja technique of a mechanical doll on Koike-Sensei to make him look brave. |
| 680 | Kio is blamed! (Prove of Kio's innocence) (証明！影千代の潔白の巻) | Koike-Sensei blames Kio for eating his grilled fish. But Kio proves his innocence with Hattori's help. |
| 681 | Hattori's useful ideas (Make an awesome prop bed) (すてきな花壇をつくるでござるの巻) | Kenichi promises Yumeko that he will clean the school backyard. But Kemumaki and Kio grow wild Koga plants. So, Hattori makes Kemumaki clean the place. |
| 682 | Will it rain or not? (Ninja technique of predicting climate) (忍法天気読みとり大外れ？の巻) | Koike-Sensei considers himself to be a rain man and gets worried about his date with Aiko-Sensei. Hattori predicts no rain, but it starts raining. |
| 692 | The use of a special silk thread (Aerial swimming with an unseen rope) (見えない糸で空中遊泳の巻) | Hattori grows Iga silkworms to make a thread out of it. But Kemumaki includes a Koga silkworm in it. So, Hattori and the rest pretend using a thread. |
| 693 | Kio's scrubber ninja technique! (Kio change the tears ninja technique) (影千代涙の変身忍法の巻) | Hattori receives a parcel from Iga town. So, Kio takes the look of a scrubber like his ancestors and takes the parcel from Hattori. |
| 694 | A trouble for Kenichi! (Gimmick mountain cottage on a snow top mountain) (雪山のからくり山荘の巻) | Yumeko, Kenichi, and his friends go skiing. Kemumaki takes a girl's look and creates a tiff between Yumeko and Kenichi. |

=== Season 5 ===
- 189: Rice planting competition (田植えに挑戦の巻)
- 190: A strange confession (おかしな告白の巻)
- 192: Shishimaru is being kidnapped (誘拐された獅子丸の巻)
- 193: I just hate cameras (カメラはキライキライの巻)
- 195: Improving the robot (ロボットに強くなろうの巻)
- 198: Kenichi is a man (ケン一氏は男でござるの巻)
- 199: Tsubame Ninja Love Sparks Technique (ツバメ忍法恋火花の巻)
- 200: A challenge to stop mom (ママ上足どめ作戦の巻)
- 206: A western stock farm (西部劇牧場の巻)
- 207: Papa's confidence (パパの自信タップリ日曜大工の巻)
- 209: An incident on father's day (父の日のできごとの巻)
- 210: Leave, Shishimaru (スッポン獅子丸を放せの巻)
- 211: The dumb old policeman (どじなおまわりさんの巻)
- 214: Afraid of cakes? (ケーキが怖いの巻)
- 215: Beware of goods displayed at bazaar (バザー・出品作にご用心の巻)
- 217: A bad new classmate (つむじまがりの転校生の巻)
- 218: Doing one best thing a day (やりぬくぞ一日一善の巻)
- 219: Catching crayfish (忍法ザリガニつりの巻)
- 283: The culprit is a secret (犯人の名はヒミツにすべしの巻)
- 285: Very busy with ninja change yourself technique (忍法変り身大忙しの巻)
- 286: Kenichi starts zen meditation (座禅をはじめたケン一氏の巻)
- 301: Yumeko's personal invitation (夢子ちゃんの手作りご招待の巻)
- 307: Teacher is the best fisherman (先生はルアーの名人だの巻)
- 311: Shishimaru suffers from stomach trouble (お腹をこわしたシンゾウの巻)
- 312: Teacher's Instant Camera (先生のインスタントカメラの巻)
- 314: The forgotten lottery (忘れていた宝くじの巻)
- 315: Teach me how to sleep (眠れる方法教えるでござるの巻)
- 316: Yumeko poses for the painting (モデルになった夢子ちゃんの巻)
- 317: Shishimaru has no confidence (自信をなくした獅子丸の巻)
- 319: Mama's pampering (ママ上のえこひいきの巻)
- 320: Let's stop sir's hiccups (先生のシャックリをとめろの巻)
- 322: How an ad balloon comes to rescue (アドバルーンで助けてぇの巻)
- 325: Yumeko's sweater which got shrunk (縮んだ夢子殿のセーターの巻)
- 332: The head of the statue gives away (彫刻の首が落ちたの巻)
- 333: Kenichi's talent is exploding (ケン一氏才能の爆発でござるの巻)
- 340: Sir is having trouble with his mom (先生氏の苦手はお母さんの巻)
- 341: The scary snowlady (雪女はこわいよォの巻)
- 356: Ninja technique of crow puppets (忍法カラス操りの巻)
- 360: Sir is in love (先生氏が恋をしたの巻)
- 366: Flying range of pigeons (とんだはとレースの巻)
- 368: Restoring sir's reputation (先生の名誉回復作戦の巻)
- 370: Shishimaru is a ninja dog (獅子丸は忍者犬でござるの巻)
- 373: The bear uproar the sky to rein (スキー場はクマ騒動の巻)
- 378: Recover the policemen's pistol (おまわりさんのピストルを取り返せの巻)
- 380: Kenichi is having a very bad stomach ache (ケンちゃんのおなか大ピンチの巻)
- 384: Beware of compliments (おせじにご用心の巻)
- 411: Ninja bowling war (忍法ボウリング合戦の巻)
- 413: A big discovery, African (大発見！アフリカグモの巻)
- 414: Shishimaru wants to become a bronze statue(銅像になりたい獅子丸の巻)

| Japanese EP# | Title | Synopsis |
|---|---|---|
| 20 | The Talent Show (It is not easy to play a central character) (主役になるのは大変でござるの巻) | Kenichi takes training from Shishimaru and acts just as Shishimaru teaches him. The audience has a hearty laugh watching the talent show. |
| 23 | Shishimaru Becomes Lion! (Shishimaru vanished) (消えた獅子丸の巻) | The Mitsuba family visit the zoo. Shishimaru shows his ninja techniques to the lions as he wishes to be like them. |
| 24 | Sketching Sceneries (Found some autumn) (小さな秋みつけたの巻) | Kaiko Sir announces students to sketch in autumn. Hattori takes a goat's look and eats Kemumaki and Kenichi's drawing paper and saves them from feeling ashamed before the teacher. |
| 26 | The Movie Plan! (It's Really Difficult to Read a Woman's Mind) (女ごころはむずかしいでござるの巻) | Kenichi and Kemumaki shows Yumeko movie ticket. They fight for going with them. Then Yumeko goes with Shinzou. |
| 27 | Winning A Doll In Prize (Winning a Prize) (懸賞に当選でござるの巻) | Kenichi sees Yumeko posting card in Letter Box with praying for doll. So Kenichi helps Yumeko for Doll. Kenichi wins a doll prize. He gives to Yumeko. |
| 28 | Catching Sea Fish at an Old Pond! (Catching Sea Fish at an Old Pond) (古池でタイが釣れたでござるの巻) | Kenichi finds fishing rod in cupboard but it broke. So, Hattori makes New fishing Rod. Kio gives garbages to Hattori's fishing rod with avoiding fishes. Shinzo brings big fish from market. |
| 29 | Finding Lost Items! (Who's the owner of the lost property?) (落しぬしはだれでござるの巻) | Kemumaki finds eraser in ground so he shows to Kaiko Sir so he gives Kenichi incharge to find lost properties. So Shishimaru smells and find every lost property. |
| 289 | Hattori Has Disappeared (Hattori Leaves Home) (消えたハットリくんの巻) | Kemumaki exchanges Hattori's letters in order to stay in the house. So, Hattori takes Kentaru's look and makes Kemumaki and Kio do all his work. |
| 32 | Flowered by Sweet Potatoes! (Flowered by sweet potatoes) (ジャガイモにはまいったでござるの巻) | Misuba checks flower not grown. Then Kenichi's father brings box of sweet potatoes. Then Kenichi and Shinzou gets trouble of potato. Then they dig ground and hides potatoes then Hattori grows flower full of potato. |
| 34 | Papa's Weight Loss Strategy! (Dad's Weight Loss Strategy) (パパ上の減量作戦の巻) | When Papa sits in train so Misuba tells that He has become fat. So He starts dieting by not eating food. He sees everything as Food. |
| 39 | Shishimaru A Dodgeball! (Shishimaru Becomes A Dodgeball) (ドッチボールーになった獅子丸の巻) | Kenichi plays dodgeball with their friends. Hattori teaches Him to play dodgeball. So Hattori makes him dodge ball. To teach him lesson. Then He turns into lion. |
| 40 | Yuki Creates a Trouble! (Babysitting Got Them in Trouble) (子守には参ったでござるの巻) | Kenichi's Neighbour gives a Yuki baby which trouble. This Baby troubles Kenichi and Hattori. Then Kenichi's Neighbour then takes Yuki back. |
| 44 | Oh, God! It's an Earthquake! (Oh god, it's earthquake) (すわ地震でござるの巻) | When Misuba Family sleeps at night. But then they heard noise of earthquake. So they practices to save things in earthquake. |
| 45 | Getting an Exclusive Story! (Getting an Exclusive Story) (特ダネを探せの巻) | Kenichi makes a story on catching thieves. Kemumaki tries to spoil. Yumeko tells Kenichi to makes story on walking on water. Then He takes help of Hattori. |
| 46 | The Skateboard Race! (Mighty Will with Skateboard) (スケートボードは大騒動の巻) | Kemumaki tries to show Yumeko and Kenichi about balancing in bamboo stick. But Kemumaki challenges Kenichi to skate till the town. |
| 48 | Beat Out the Decayed Tooth! (Beat Out the Decayed Tooth) (虫歯をやっつけるでござるの巻) | Kenichi eats biscuits in night then Misuba tells Kenichi to brush in night. But Kenichi gets tooth ache in School. So he takes help of Hattori. |
| 49 | Bringing the Voice Together! (Bringing the Voice Together!) (忍法声とリもちの巻) | Kenichi's Father sings song loudly so everyone family gets disturbed so Hattori makes rice ball of voice without disturb. Then Hattori collects in Scroll. |
| 56 | Where Have the Twenty Points Gone? (Where 20 points have gone?) (20点はどこへいったの巻) | Kenichi gets 20 marks in exam in his paper. Then Kenichi tries to burn paper but paper flies. Then Kenichi paper goes into cycle. Then Kenichi tries to take paper from cycle. Then Kemumaki takes paper and mix paper. Then Hattori takes real paper. |
| 59 | Ninja Technique of Rabbit Ears! (Ninja Technique of Rabbit Ears) (忍法うさぎの耳の巻) | Hattori hears everything with his rabbit ears. Then Kenichi takes help of Hattori to hear like rabbit ears. |
| 60 | Shishimaru, a Talented Artist! (The talented artist, Shishimaru) (シシ丸は天才画家の巻) | Shishimaru makes a paingting with his legs. Then takes it by mistakenly his painting. Hattori disguises as a Master and makes his painting selected. |
| 61 | Kenichi The Photographer (This is a Kodak Moment) (これぞシャッターチャンスの巻) | Kenichi shows him his clicked photos then he shows his dirty photo of his dads photo. Then he tries to click duck photos. |
| 62 | Where Did the Tiger Run Away? (Where the runaway tiger has gone?) (逃げたトラは何処に？の巻) | When Kenichi and Shinzo was playing tennis then Shinzo saw a baby of tiger and Kenichi tries to take care. |
| 64 | Mystery of the Haunted House! (Who is screaming in the scary voice?) (こわい声の正体は誰かの巻) | Kenichi and Yumeko goes to Haunted House. Then Kenichi and Shinzo goes inside house. Kemumaki disguise as ghost. When Hattori gets to know the truth he teaches him lesson. |
| 65 | Has Kiyo Hatched the Egg? (Has Kiyo hatched the eggs?) (たまごの親は影千代の巻) | Kaiko sir teaches how to hatch eggs. Then Kenichi brings eggs from poultry farm. So Hattori makes Kio hypnotise makes him lay eggs. |
| 66 | House Cleaning is Not Easy! (Spring cleaning is not easy) (大掃除は大変でござるの巻) | Misuba Family cleans house. So Shinzo asks Misuba clean house but they tells Shinzo to play. But Shinzo reads comics then he sleeps. Then all find Shinzo in Garbage area. |
| 70 | What Do Mice Like the Most? (What mice like the most?) (ネズミの大好きな物は...の巻) | Misuba makes cheese cake but mice eats all cheese cake. When Misuba scolds at children's. When All heard Dad's screams then all comes. Then Hattori tries to trap mice by making them eating cheese balls. |
| 71 | Kenichi Practices For Skiing! (I love skiing!) (スキーは大スキーでござるの巻) | Kaiko announces to go at skiing. Then Kenichi takes help of Hattori. Then Kenichi practices for skiing. Kenichi teaches Yumeko how to skiing. Then Kenichi and Kemumaki falls down. |
| 72 | Saturday Afternoon is Quiet Boring! (Saturday afternoon is quite boring) (土曜の午後は退屈でござるの巻) | Kenichi goes to library for reading book. But Uncle stops Kenichi to stop reading in free. Shinzo comes to read comics and cry. Hattori hypnotizes. |
| 77 | Kiyo Remembers His Master! (Kiyo remembers his master) (影千代は御主人様おもいの巻) | Misuba family goes out. Shishimaru captures thief. In newspaper Shishimaru comes. So Kio also does same like Shishimaru. |
| 78 | Shinzou Takes Up Ninja Technique Challenge! (Shinzo takes up ninja technique challenge) (シンゾウ金縛りの術に挑戦するの巻) | Shinzou requests Hattori for ninja technique. But Kenichi and Yumeko goes for cycle riding. Kemumaki and Kio convince to use ninja technique upon Kenichi. Yumeko and Kenichi is in trouble. Hattori saves and teaches lesson to Shinzo. |
| 79 | Invitation to Mama's Tea Party! (Invitation to mama's tea party) (ママのお茶会に招待の巻) | Misuba invites Everyone to tea party. But Kemumaki breaks the cup of tea. Kemumaki sticks bowl with Glue. Kemumaki and Kenichi fights then he breaks. Misuba scolds for breaking. Hattori teaches lesson by making truth of breaking of bowl. |
| 85 | Kiyo, Father of an Abandoned Cat! (Kio, father of an abandoned cat) (捨て猫のパパは影千代の巻) | When Shishimaru sleeps in bed. He finds cat in Shishimaru's house. Hattori suspects of Kio his father. Hattori finds owner of cat by calling all cats. Then Hattori gets to know about Kenichi's father friends cat. |
| 86 | Skate Like a Pro! (Skate like a pro) (スケートが上手になりたいの巻) | Kenichi and Yumeko plays hide and seek. So Kemumaki challenges Kenichi for skate. So Kenichi takes help of Hattori. So Hattori uses ninja shadow technique. |
| 87 | Ninja Art of Messaging Technique! (Ninja art of messaging technique) (忍法伝言の術でござるの巻) | Kenichi's Father calls Kenichi to give message. So Shinzo tells Shishimaru to bring message from Kenichi. Yumeko tells Kemumaki to give message. Kemumaki gives to Hattori message. Hattori gives message to Kenichi's Father. |
| 89 | Looking Out For a Sponsor! (Looking out for a sponsor) (スポンサーを探すでござるの巻) | Kenichi goes to cake shop. He sees Kemumaki getting free cake. So Kemumaki tells he is sponsor of shop. Kenichi and his Friends also look for sponsor. Kenichi runs away on seeing Kaiko Sir. |
| 92 | The Swimming Competition! (Swimming in the cold water) (寒中水泳に攄戦するの巻) | Kaiko Sir announces students to swimming in cold water. So Kenichi takes help of Hattori. Hattori shows Kenichi bathing suit while swimming. Kenichi and Kemumaki participates in competition. Then Kenichi that his suit was abandoned in water. |
| 95 | Papa is Being Called to the School! (Dad is Being Called to the School) (パパ上学校に呼ばれるの巻) | Kaiko Sir announces Students Father parents to come school. So Kenichi takes help of Hattori to save from Papa scolding. So Hattori disguises as Papa. So Kenichi thinks Papa as Hattori. Kenichi realises His Father. |
| 97 | Hell Broke Loose at the Bath House! (Hell Broke Loose at the Bathhouse) (お風呂屋さんは大混乱の巻) | Yumeko sees Kemumaki going to spa. Kenichi also goes to spa. Kemumaki and Hattori takes bath. Then Kemumaki cheats in Bathing. So teaches lesson. Kenichi and his friends and Kemumaki and Kio takes bath. Then Kemumaki slips. |
| 98 | Radio Transceiver Commotion! (Radio Transceiver Commotion) (トランシーバー騒動の巻) | Kenichi gets a radio so Kenichi and Shinzo talks far away from radio. Kemumaki snatches Radio from Shinzo. So Hattori teaches Kemumaki a lesson. |
| 124 | Kenichi Becomes a Musician! (Kenichi Becomes a Big Musician) (大音楽家ケン一氏の巻) | Music teacher tells Kenichi to sing song so Kenichi sings badly. So Hattori uses Ninja Shadow technique upon music teacher with Kenichi's lonely song. |
| 99 | Kenichi's Fake Illness! (Oh, I hate winters!) (寒いのはキライキライの巻) | Kenichi doesn't want to exercise in winter season. So Kenichi fools Yumeko he is not well. Yumeko takes Kenichi in School doctor. So Kemumaki disguises as Doctor. Hattori teaches lesson. |
| 100 | Ninja Reversing Role Technique! (Ninja Reversing Role Technique) (忍法アベコベの術でござるの巻) | Kenichi brakes things of Mitsuba's House. So Hattori and Kenichi changes personality. When Kenichi's mother father gets to know the truth they teaches lesson. |
| 103 | Freeze in the Cold and Eat Steaks! (Freeze in the cold and eat steaks) (寒さこらえてステーキ食べようの巻) | Kenichi and His Family saves pocket money in winter season. So Kenichi and his Father sits near sun. Kenichi and his Father feels ill. |
| 108 | Fight Off the Demon on Setsubun Festival! (Fight Off the Demon on Setsubun Festival) (今日は節分鬼退治の巻) | Kenichi and His Family plays a demon game with beans. So Kenichi and Shinzo plays demon as Shishimaru eats all beans. So Hattori disguises as Papa and plays demon game with beans. |
| 110 | Papa's Documents Flew Away! (Papa's documents flew away) (パパ上の書類は飛ぶのでござるの巻) | Shinzo keeps his documents somewhere else. So Kenichi and his Friends finds for the document. So Kemumaki takes document. Hattori snatches and gives to his father |
| 117 | A Part-Time Job! (A part-time job) (とんだアルバイトでござるの巻) | Kemumaki fools Kenichi for part time job his neighbour. So Kenichi takes cares pig child but pig child messes house. Then Kemumaki makes eat Koga special carrot. Pig child mother tells Kemumaki to take care. |
| 118 | Shishimaru Turns Into a Rabbit! (Shishimaru turns into a rabbit) (うさぎになった獅子丸の巻) | Kenichi take cares of rabbit then opens the cage rabbit runs away. Then Kenichi takes Help of Shishimaru to become rabbit. Then Hattori takes Shishimaru and keeps real rabbit. |
| 121 | It's Valentine's Day! (It's Valentine's Day) (バレンタインデー事件の巻) | Kemumaki tries to make disguises. Kemumaki disguises as Kenichi's and Yumeko gives Kemumaki gift. When Kenichi comes Yumeko does not give gift. Kenichi cries. When Hattori gets to know truth Hattori becomes Yumeko and takes extra gift from Kemumaki and gives to Kenichi. |
| 126 | Crook Technique Leads to an Injury! (Crook technique leads to an injury) (生忍法はケガのもとの巻) | Kenichi sees Misuba's photo. So Kemumaki makes practices for Ninja technique. Kemumaki makes fool Kenichi. Then Hattori saves Kenichi.Then Kenichi practise for Ninja Techniques. |
| 132 | Morning Star Comes Up Too Early! (Morning star comes up too early) (明けの明星は早起きでござるの巻) | In School Kemumaki shows Morning Star photos to Kenichi and Yumeko. Kenichi takes help of Hattori to wake up early. Then Kenichi shows photo to Yumeko. Then Kemumaki brings fantastic morning star photo. |
| 133 | Ninja Technique of Grandfather Hanasaka! (Ninja technique of grandfather hanasaka) (忍法花咲かじいさんの巻) | Kenichi and family goes to spring cherry tree for a trip. Then Hattori tries to put cherry tree leaves on the tree. Then all goes to picnic. |
| 137 | Let's Make a Raft with Empty Cans! (Let's make a raft with empty cans) (あきカンでイカダを作るの巻) | Ninja hattori helps to make raft with empty cans. Although Kemumaki tries to ruin their plan hattori takes advantage of Kemumaki. |
| 138 | Ninja Fast Writing Technique! (Ninja fast writing technique) (忍法速書きの術の巻) | Kenichi has forgotten to do his homework again. Hattori who couldn't see it Ninja "fast writing" technique I managed to make it in time to submit my homework for writing kanji. Kenichi who tasted this Hattori tried to impose the dictation homework that was given to me again. |
| 139 | Shishimaru Sings a Lullaby! (Shishimaru sings a lullaby) (獅子丸子守唄の巻) | Shishimaru, who was missed by a lost piglet for some reason I had no choice but to take care of the piglet. On the other hand, Hattori and his friends are Ninja Hattori I decided to find a piglet's mother and the found mother pig looks just like Shishimaru... |
| 141 | I Am a Novelist! (Hattori, the novelist) (ハットリ剣豪小説に挑戦の巻) | Hattori writes a novel after seeing a heroic movie. At last it comes out that he has only written the title. |
| 143 | What a Space Exhibition! (What, a space exhibition) (宇宙博覧会はすごいでござるの巻) | Kenichi and his friends came to the Space Expo, but because there were so many people everywhere, they decided to eat lunch for the time being. Kenichi who has hidden the hamburger for Shinzo, behaves so as not to be exposed, but at the weightlessness experiment corner he visited after that, the hidden hamburger accidentally pops out. |
| 149 | Jogging? Leave It to Me! (Jogging? Leave it to me) (ジョッキングはおまかせの巻) | Kentaro was enthusiastic about starting jogging, but he gave up after waking up early. In order to somehow get him to continue jogging, Hattori disguises himself as a thief and appears in front of Kentaro to make him chase him. |
| 150 | Mama, a Novelist! (Mom becomes the novelist) (ママ上は小説家の巻) | Ama aims to be a novelist, so the whole family will support her. However, when she sees Ama who can't write well and quickly boils down, Hattori uses the ninja "Flirting Hirameki" technique to help. And finally the novel is completed, and everyone will read it... |
| 151 | Kenichi Hates Yumeko! (I hate Yumeko) (夢子ちゃんなんか嫌いの巻) | Kenichi is teased by Shinzou and Shishimaru for liking Yumeko. Shinzou and others, who took it seriously, told his girlfriend Yumeko about it, and Kenichi was disliked by her girlfriend Yumeko. Hattori, who can't stand it, prepares a place to reconcile the two, but... |
| 152 | Shishimaru, a Star of the Circus! (Shishimaru becomes a star in the circus) (獅子丸はサーカスのスターの巻) | Kenichi, Shinzou, and Shishimaru go to the circus, but only Shishimaru is refused entry. Shishimaru manages to sneak into the venue, and by chance, he becomes a popular circus performer. Hearing the rumors, Kemumaki, who is not amused, infiltrates the circus with Kiyo and tries to remove Shishimaru from the stardom. |
| 153 | Ninja Baseball! (Ninja baseball) (忍者野球の巻) | Kenichi who is constantly losing to Kemumaki in baseball, forms a team with Hattori and applies for a match in order to win. Despite Kenichi's struggle against Kemumaki, Hattori shows great success. But Hattori is so absorbed in it that he completely forgets that he is playing for the team. |
| 156 | Frog Training is Terrible! (Frog training is terrible) (カエル修行はつらいでござるの巻) | Seeing Hattori say that Shinzou is afraid of snakes and that he doesn't have enough training, Kenichi decides to use a frog to play a prank on Hattori. Hattori, who felt that his training was still lacking after being pranked, trains more to overcome his dislike of frogs, but Kenichi comes again to try to prank him. |
| 157 | April Fool, a Battle of Telling Lies! (April fool, a battle of telling lies) (エイプリルフールうそつき合戦の巻) | Today is April Fool's Day. Kenichi, who is easily deceived by Kemumaki, is in a bad mood, but due to a misunderstanding by a police officer, he is ordered to pick up empty cans on the side of the road. So Kenichi comes up with a lie that "If you collect empty cans and bring them to the park, you can get sweets," but the rumor quickly spreads throughout the town... |
| 159 | When a Puppy Comes! (When a puppy comes) (ひろってきた小犬の巻) | Kenichi and his friends find an abandoned puppy in the park and decide to keep it in secret without telling their mother. Kenichi and his friends are at a loss when their mother finds them and names them Little Shishimaru. Feeling sorry for the situation, Hattori uses his ninja techniques to help keep Little Shishimaru at home. |
| 167 | Spring Comes in Shishimaru's Life, Too! (Spring comes in Shishimaru's life too) (獅子丸も春でござるの巻) | Hattori felt something strange about Shishimaru. She seems to have fallen in love with a dog named Mary, but Shishimaru's efforts are in vain. In order to cheer up the heartbroken Shishimaru, Hattori decides to go out of his way. |
| 168 | The Challenge of Dangerous Parkour House! (There is Something in the Surprise House) (ドッキリハウスにナニがあるの巻) | Kemumaki invites Yumeko to Surprise House, an attraction full of surprises in the dark. When Kenichi sees it, he says he's going too, even though he's not good at darkness. There, Hattori teaches him the ninja technique of "Cat Glasses", but it's actually a lie to give Kenichi confidence. |
| 171 | Baking Cake In Bakery Shop (Had Lot of Cake! ) (ケーキはもうたくさんの巻) | Kenichi and his friends are asked by the owner of a cake shop to take care of the shop. Kenichi and his friends panicked when Shishimaru accidentally ate a half-made decorated cake during the store, so they decided to disguise Shishimaru as a cake instead to survive the situation. Meanwhile, the husband who came back finished the Shishimaru cake without knowing anything and went to deliver it. |
| 174 | Shishimaru Has an Upset Stomach! (Shishimaru has an upset stomach) (お腹をこわした獅子丸の巻) | Gluttonous Shishimaru eats most of the food in the house with the ninja technique of "gluttony". As expected, Shishimaru has an upset stomach, and Hattori makes him promise to fast for three days. However, Hattori, who is worried about whether Shishimaru will be able to keep his promise, creates a device to monitor Shishimaru. |
| 175 | Kenichi, the Famous Manager! (Kenichi, the famous manager) (ケン一氏は名監督でござるの巻) | Kenichi is overjoyed when he receives an 8mm camera for his birthday. He immediately decides to use the camera to make a ninja movie starring him. However, Kenichi, who can't imitate the movements of a ninja, changes the main character to Hattori and continues filming, but Hattori is too conscious of the camera and can't behave well. |
| 176 | Kenichi Delivers Newspaper! (The Scary Newspaper Delivery) (こわい新聞配達の巻) | Kenichi decides to start delivering newspapers for his father. Hattori and the others are impressed by Kenichi's filial piety and willingly cooperate. Kemumaki who doesn't find it amusing, plans to get in the way with Kiyo, while Kenichi is getting more and more enthusiastic with Yumeko's support. |
| 180 | Kenichi Wants to Become a Big Man! (I want to become a big man) (大人になりた～いの巻) | Kenichi who is tired of playing as a child, asks Hattori to become an adult for just one day. With the help of Hattori, Kenichi borrows his father's clothes and disguises himself, sneaks out of the house, goes out into town, and takes a peek at the adult playground. |
| 186 | Kemumaki Becomes Hattori Creates Trouble! (Fake Hattori Creates Havoc) (にせものは困るでござるの巻) | Kemumaki who doesn't like Hattori's popularity, ends up damaging Hattori's reputation by disguising himself as Hattori and doing bad things. People who don't realize that Kemumaki is the one who is doing bad things all over town catch Hattori and hang him up from a tree. |
| 189 | Rice Planting Competition! (Rice planting competition) (田植えに挑戦の巻) | Kenichi and his friends invites Kemumaki and Yumeko to visit grandma's house in the countryside. Kenichi decides to help out with the rice planting for his grandma. Kenichi is proceeding with the rice planting smoothly, but Kemumaki cannot overlook it... |
| 190 | A Strange Confession! (A strange confession) (おかしな告白の巻) | Kenichi who doesn't want Yumeko to be taken away by Kemumaki, asks Hattorito help him practice his confession. However, when he sees Yumeko in front of him, Kenichi gets agitated and can't talk at all as he practiced. So Hattori tried to help using the ninja technique of "Voice Utsushi", but... |
| 192 | Shishimaru is Kidnapped! (Shishimaru is being kidnapped) (誘拐された獅子丸の巻) | Shishimaru who was out on an errand with Shinzou, sees a missing dog poster. At that point, Shishimaru is kidnapped by someone, and Shinzou rushes to Hattori for help. On the other hand, Shishimaru, who was brought to the warehouse, meets the missing dogs there. |
| 193 | Kemumaki Clicks Kenichi's Photos! (I Just Hate Cameras) (カメラはキライキライの巻) | Kemumaki who has obtained a Polaroid camera, takes ugly pictures of Kenichi. Unable to forgive Kenichi, he asks Hattori to take back the photo, but he does not move. Meanwhile, Kemumaki plans to take a disgraceful photo of Hattori this time. |
| 195 | Kenichi Builds Robot! (Improving The Robot) (ロボットに強くなろうの巻) | Kenichi tries to show Yumeko that he can build a robot, but with Shinzou's help, he manages to show Yumeko a moving robot. However, his relief is short-lived, and Kenichi is in a panic when he decides to lend the robot to Yumeko. Furthermore, Yumeko says that she will show the robot to Kemumaki... |
| 198 | Kenichi Becomes Strong Man! (Kenichi is a Man) (ケンー氏は男でござるの巻) | |
| 199 | Tsubame's Ninja Love Spark Technique! (Tsubame Ninja love sparks technique) (ツバメ忍法恋火花の巻) | |
| 200 | A Challenge to Stop Mama! (A challenge to stop Mom) (ママ上足どめ作戦の巻) | |
| 206 | A Western Stock Farm! (A western stock farm) (西部劇牧場の巻) | |
| 207 | Papa's Confidence! (Papa's confidence) (パパの自信タップリ日曜大工の巻) | |
| 209 | An Incident on Father's Day! (An incident on Father's Day) (父の日のできごとの巻) | |
| 210 | Leave Shishimaru! (Leave Shishimaru) (スッポン獅子丸を放せの巻) | |
| 211 | The Dumb Policeman! (The dumb old policeman) (どじなおまわりさんの巻) | |
| 214 | Afraid of Cakes? (Afraid of cakes?) (ケーキが怖いの巻) | |
| 215 | The Prank Doll in Bazzar! (Beware of Goods Displayed at Bazzar) (バザー・出品作にご用心の巻) | |
| 217 | New Naughty Classmate! (A Bad New Classmate) (つむじまかりの転校生の巻) | |
| 218 | Doing One Best Thing a Day! (Doing one best thing a day) (やりぬくぞー日一善の巻) | |
| 219 | Catching Crayfish! (Catching crayfish) (忍法ザリガニつりの巻) | |
| 223 | The Ninja Grandma! (The ninja grandma) (とんだくのー志願の巻) | |
| 227 | The Gorilla's Visit to the City! (The gorilla's visit to the city) (ゴリラが街にやって来たの巻) | |
| 228 | Sumo Training is Tough! (Sumo training is tough) (お相撲の修業は大変でござるの巻) | |
| 230 | Kenichi's Fine Play! (Kenichi's fine play) (ケンー氏のファインプレーの巻) | |
| 231 | A Scrabble Over a Bride! (A scrabble over a bride) (お嫁さん争奪戦の巻) | |
| 232 | Let's Catch the Myna! (Let's catch the myna!) (九官鳥をつかまえろの巻) | |
| 234 | Ninja, the Great Train Challenge! (Ninja, the great train challenge) (忍法大列車作戦!!の巻) | |
| 235 | Pancakes Stuffed with Bean Jam! (Kenichi Prepares Handmade, Fish-shape Pancakes Stuffed with Bean Jam) (ケンー氏の手作りタイ焼きの巻) | |
| 236 | The Real Culprit Who Licked the Sugar! (The real culprit who licked the sugar) (砂糖をなめた真花人の巻) | |
| 240 | Kiyo Runs Away! (Kiyo runs away) (逃げ出した影千代の巻) | |
| 244 | We've Had it with the Ninja Mansion! (We have had it with the ninja mansion) (忍者屋敷はコリゴリでござるの巻) | |
| 246 | Laugh and Grow Fat! (Laugh and grow fat) (笑う門には福がくるの巻) | |
| 248 | Let's Climb Mount Fuji! (Let's climb mount fuji) (富士山に登ろうの巻) | |
| 251 | Capturing Unicorn Beetles! (Capturing unicorn beetles) (かふと虫捕獲作戦の巻) | |
| 256 | Ninja Sleep Manipulation Technique! (Ninja sleep manipulation technique) (ビックリ忍法眠りあやつりの巻) | |
| 270 | Papa is a Gifted Ninja! (Dad is gifted Iga Ninja) (パパ上は伊賀上忍でござるの巻) | |
| 271 | Ninja Human Kite Technique! (Ninja human kite technique) (忍法人間ダコの巻) | |
| 278 | When Typhoon Comes! (When typhoon comes) (台風がやってきたの巻) | |
| 279 | Scared, Scared! Everyone Are Scared! (Scared, Scared, Everyone are scared) (コワイコワイは皆こわいの巻) | |
| 280 | Shinzou's Young Thunder Technique! (Shinzo's young thunder technique) (シンゾウ流忍法児雷也の術の巻) | |
| 281 | Drama in the School Play! (Cindrella in the School Play) (学芸会はシンデレラ姫に決定の巻) | |
| 288 | Do Not Trouble Girls! (Catching a Spoiled Brat) (イタズラッ子を捕らえてみればの巻) | |
| 291 | Kenichi Burned Yumeko's Picture Post Card! (Yumeko's Picture Postcard Which Got Burnt) (燃えたゆめ子どのの絵はがきの巻) | |
| 293 | Kenichi Practice For Running Race! (Kenichi Works Hard) (ケンー氏頑張るの巻) | |
| 283 | The Culprit is a Secret! (The culprit is a secret) (犯人の名はヒミツにすべしの巻) | |
| 285 | Very Busy With Ninja Change Yourself Technique! (Very busy with ninja change yourself technique) (忍法変わり身大忙しの巻) | |
| 286 | Kenichi Learns Meditation! (Kenichi Starts Zen Meditation) (座禅をはじめたケンー氏の巻) | |
| 294 | Ninja So Many Troubles Technique! (Ninja so many troubles technique) (忍法なんかめいわくの巻) | |
| 295 | Kenichi Goes on a Field Trip! (Kenichi goes on a field trip) (遠足は世がやけるでござるの巻) | |
| 297 | Hattori's Style Special Method of Learning Kanji! (Hattori's style special method of learning kanji) (ハットリ式漢字特訓法の巻) | |
| 301 | Yumeko's Personal Invitation! (Yumeko's personal invitation) (夢子ちゃんの手作りご招待の巻) | |
| 307 | Teacher is the Best Fisherman! (Teacher is the best fisherman) (先生はルアーの名人だの巻) | |
| 311 | Shinzou Suffers a Stomach Ache! (Shishimaru suffers from stomach trouble) (お腹をこわしたシンゾウの巻) | |
| 312 | Improving Kaiko's Photography! (Teacher's Instant Camera) (先生のインスタントカメラの巻) | |
| 314 | The Forgotten Lottery! (The forgotten lottery) (忘れていた空くじの巻) | |
| 315 | Kenichi Sheep Counting in Sleeping! (Teach Me How To Sleep) (眠れる方法教えるでござるの巻) | |
| 316 | Yumeko Poses For a Painting! (Yumeko poses for the painting) (モデルになった夢子ちゃんの巻) | |
| 317 | Shishimaru Has No Confidence! (Shishimaru has no confidence) (自信をなくした獅子丸の巻) | |
| 319 | The Jealousy! (Mama's Pampering) (ママ上のえこひいきの巻) | |
| 320 | Let's Stop Sir's Hiccups! (Let's stop Sir's hiccups) (先生のシャックリをとめろの巻) | |
| 322 | How an Ad Balloon Comes to Rescue! (How an ad balloon comes to rescue) (アドバルーンで助けてぇの巻) | |
| 325 | Yumeko's Sweater Which Got Shrunk! (Yumeko's sweater which got shrunk) (縮んだ夢子殿のセーターの巻) | |
| 332 | The Head Of the Statue Gives Way! (The Head of the Statue Gives Away) (彫刻の首が落ちたの巻) | |
| 333 | Kenichi's Talent is Exploding! (Kenichi's talent is exploding) (ケンー氏才能の爆発でござるの巻) | |
| 340 | Sir is Having Trouble With His Mama! (Sir is having trouble with his Mom) (先生氏の苦手はお母さんの巻) | |
| 341 | The Scary Snowlady! (The scary snowlady) (雪女はこわいよォの巻) | |
| 344 | Beware of Boss' Dog! (Beware of Boss' dog) (社長の犬にご用心！の巻) | |
| 354 | Kemumaki Hits Rock Bottom! (Kemumaki hits rock bottom) (ケムマキどん底だ！の巻) | |
| 356 | Ninja Technique of Crow Puppets! (Ninja technique of crow puppets) (忍法カラス操りの巻) | |
| 360 | Sir Is In Love! (Sir is in love) (先生氏が恋をしたの巻) | |
| 366 | Flying Race of Pigeons! (Flying range of pigeons) (とんだはとレースの巻) | |
| 368 | Restoring Sir's Reputation! (Restoring Sir's reputation) (先生の名誉回復作戦の巻) | |
| 370 | Shishimaru is a Ninja Dog! (Shishimaru is a ninja dog) (獅子丸は忍者犬でござるの巻) | |
| 373 | The Bear Uproar at the Sky to Rein! (The bear uproar the sky to rein) (スキー場はクマ騒動の巻) | |
| 378 | Recover the Policeman's Pistol! (Recover the policemen's pistol) (おまわりさんのピストルを取り返せの巻) | |
| 380 | Kenichi Has a Very Bad Stomach Ache! (Kenichi is having a very bad stomach ache) (ケンちゃんのおなか大ピンチの巻) | |
| 384 | Beware of Compliments! (Beware of compliments) (おせじにご用心の巻) | |
| 386 | Ninja Test is a Big Mess! (Ninja test is a mess) (忍者試験は大混乱の巻) | |
| 388 | Ninja Technique of Intertwining the Heart! (Ninja technique of intertwining the heart) (忍法心合わせの巻) | |
| 415 | Hell Breaks Loose Because of a Strange Visitor! (Hell breaks loose because of a strange visitor) (不意のお客で騒動の巻) | |
| 396 | Birthday Gift to Sir! (Birthday gift to Sir) (先生へのプレゼントの巻) | |
| 416 | The Kindness Test is a Great Success! (The kindness test is a great success) (やさしさテストは大成功の巻) | |
| 411 | Ninja Bowling War! (Ninja bowling war) (忍法ボウリング合戦の巻) | |
| 413 | A Big Discovery, African! (A big discovery, African) (大発見！アフリカグモの巻) | |
| 414 | Shishimaru Wants to Become a Bronze Statue! (Shishimaru wants to become a bronze statue) (銅像になりたい獅子丸の巻) | |
| 426 | The Laughter and Cries of the Amusement Park! (The Laughter and Cries of the Amusement Park) (涙と笑いの遊園地の巻) | |
| 437 | Papa Loses His Money! (Dad Loses His Money) (消えたパパのヘソクリの巻) | |

=== Special episodes ===
All these special episodes were part of 1981–1987 anime. It consists of total 11 episodes.

| Ep No | Year of release | On-Air Date | Japanese Title | English title |
|---|---|---|---|---|
| 1 | 1983 | 1-1 | お正月もニンニンでござるの巻 | Happy New Year |
| 2 | 1983 | 1-1 | 二匹の運ぶ年賀状の巻 | A new year's card carried by two animals |
| 3 | 1983 | 1-2 | とんだ初夢騒動の巻 | Tonda first dream disturbance |
| 4 | 1983 | 1-2 | おそなえ餅UFOの正体...の巻 | True identity of the offering mochi UFO... |
| 5 | 1984 | 1-2 | お正月はおみくじではじまったの巻 | New year started with Omikuji |
| 6 | 1984 | 1-2 | よい夢初夢カン違いの巻 | A good dream first dream difference |
| 7 | 1984 | 10-1 | シンゾウ黙るでござるの巻 | Shinzou, shut up! |
| 8 | 1984 | 12-31 | ケムマキ忍法追い出し作戦の巻 | Kemumaki Ninja Expel Technique Operation |
| 9 | 1985 | 1-2 | 時代劇はたご忍法帳の巻 | Period drama Hatago Ninja Scroll Technique |
| 10 | 1986 | 9-30 | 伊賀美人は守り神でござるの巻 | Iga beauty is a guardian deity |
| 11 | 1986 | 12-31 | びっくりどっきりニンニン擬態の巻 | Surprised dokkiri nin nin mimicry |

== 2012 anime ==
=== Season 1 ===
| EP# | English title | Japanese title |
|---|---|---|
| 1 | The Great Bargain Sale! | バーゲンは戦場でござる！の巻 |
| 1 | Transformation Isn't a Child's Play! | 小池先生に変身でござるの巻 |
| 2 | Everyone Needs Encouragement! | 影千代も褒められたいでござるの巻 |
| 2 | Are You Scared of Mummies? | 博物館は大パニックでござるの巻 |
| 3 | Mama's Mission Fitness! | 若返り作戦には参ったでござるの巻 |
| 3 | A Scribbling on Hattori's Face! | ラクガキが消えないでござる!?の巻 |
| 4 | Hattori Goes to Office! | サラリーマンは大変でござるの巻 |
| 4 | I'm Going to Papa's Office! | サラリーマンは大変でござるの巻 |
| 4 | Kenichi Plays Tennis! | 忍法テニスで勝負でござるの巻 |
| 4 | A Tennis Match Between Kemumaki and Kenichi! | 忍法テニスで勝負でござるの巻 |
| 5 | Shinzou Goes to Help! | シンゾウのお手伝いでござる！の巻 |
| 5 | Shinzou Wants to Help! | シンゾウのお手伝いでござる！の巻 |
| 5 | It Is Not Easy to Make Yumeko Happy! | シャッターチャンスを狙うでござる！の巻 |
| 5 | It Isn't Easy to Make Yumeko Happy! | シャッターチャンスを狙うでござる！の巻 |
| 6 | Where is the Examiner? | 試験官は誰でござる？の巻 |
| 6 | Who is the Superhero, Kenichi or Kemumaki? | ヒーローになりたいでござるの巻 |
| 7 | Being Without Electricity! | 停電に備えてサバイバル生活の巻 |
| 7 | A Day Without Electricity! | 停電に備えてサバイバル生活の巻 |
| 7 | Play and Play! | ワンニャン、忍法サッカーでござるの巻 |
| 7 | Dog Versus Cats! | ワンニャン、忍法サッカーでござるの巻 |
| 8 | Result of Sir's Homework! | 宿題1000倍はつらいでござる！の巻 |
| 8 | The Result of Sir's Homework! | 宿題1000倍はつらいでござる！の巻 |
| 8 | A Customised Cycle! | からくり自転車はスゴイでござるの巻 |
| 9 | Hattori's Prolonged Hiccups! | しゃっくりが止まらないでござる！の巻 |
| 9 | Kenichi and His Wish! | 夢子ちゃんの願いごとは何でござる？の巻 |
| 10 | A Tiff Between Shinzou and Hattori! | 兄弟ゲンカはイカンでござる！の巻 |
| 10 | Enemies or Friends? | くっついちゃったでござる！の巻 |
| 11 | To Run a Restaurant, Learn Ninja Technique! | 忍者レストランは大繁盛でござるの巻 |
| 11 | Hattori Revives a Failing Business! | 忍者レストランは大繁盛でござるの巻 |
| 11 | Kenichi's Magic is Amazing! | ケン一氏は天才手品師でござるの巻 |
| 11 | Kenichi Performs Magic Tricks! | ケン一氏は天才手品師でござるの巻 |
| 12 | Shishimaru's Kindness! | 優しい獅子丸が怖いでござるの巻 |
| 12 | Ninja House Contest! | 忍者屋敷猛レースでござるの巻 |
| 13 | We Thought Something, but Something Elses Happened! [sic] | 恋する獅子丸でござる！の巻 |
| 13 | It Wasn't as Expected! | 恋する獅子丸でござる！の巻 |
| 13 | Fishing Isn't an Easy Job! | 釣りで勝負でござる！の巻 |
| 14 | Shinzou's Paper Bird Flying Technique! | シンゾウ、新忍法に挑むでござるの巻 |
| 14 | Let's Go For a Fashion Show! | 夢子ちゃんのファッションショーでござるの巻 |
| 14 | Yumeko's Fashion Show! | 夢子ちゃんのファッションショーでござるの巻 |
| 15 | What You Saw is What You Read! | 伊賀秘伝の巻物でござるの巻 |
| 15 | What You Sow Is What You Reap! | 伊賀秘伝の巻物でござるの巻 |
| 15 | Hero to Zero! | ケムマキ氏、ビックスターになるでござるの巻 |
| 16 | Are the Security Devices Powerful? | 防犯対策はバッチリでござる！の巻 |
| 16 | Yumeko's Man of Destiny! | 夢子ちゃんは占いがお好きでござるの巻 |
| 17 | Hattori Delivery Service! | 荷物を取り返すでござるの巻 |
| 17 | A Burglar Crow! | 宝物泥棒をつかまえるでござるの巻 |
| 18 | Finding Kenichi's Lost Watch! | パパ上の腕時計でござるの巻 |
| 18 | Robert's Ninja Stumbling Technique! | 外国忍者が弟子に？でござるの巻 |
| 19 | Will Hattori Cry? | 忍者は泣かないでござるの巻 |
| 19 | The Monkey Kingdom! | お猿には負けないでござるの巻 |
| 20 | Is Papa a Good Carpenter? | 獅子丸の犬小屋を作るでござる！の巻 |
| 20 | Will Kenichi Make it to School on Time? | 学校へ一番乗りでござる！の巻 |
| 21 | The Mitsuba Family is a Ninja Family! | ケン一氏は忍者でござるの巻 |
| 21 | Bowling is Fun! | 忍者ボーリングで対決でござる！の巻 |
| 22 | An Adventurous Drive to the Amusement Park! | 決死のドライブでござるの巻 |
| 22 | Preventive Injection is a Must! | お注射大作戦でござるの巻 |
| 23 | A Challenging Golf Tournament! | 子供ゴルフ大会でござる！の巻 |
| 23 | Playing Hide-and-Seek in an Amusement Park! | 忍者訓練・隠れん坊でござる！の巻 |
| 24 | A Growing Bird, Mimicky! | なんの卵？でござるの巻 |
| 24 | The Quiz Contest! | クイズ王は誰だ?!でござるの巻 |
| 25 | Honesty is the Best Policy! | お寺の大掃除でござる！の巻 |
| 25 | The Hot Air Balloon! | からくり気球でござるの巻 |
| 26 | Kenichi's Treehouse! | ケン一氏のツリーハウスでござるの巻 |
| 26 | The Cricket Match! | クリケットに挑戦でござるの巻 |

=== Season 2 ===
| EP# | English title | Japanese title | |
|---|---|---|---|
| 27 | Red is a Dangerous Color! (Red Color is Very Dangerous) | 赤は危険でござるの巻 | |
| 27 | Let's Catch the Hens Here | ニワトリをつかまえろでござる！の巻 | |
| 28 | Overnight Camp is Really Fun! | お泊りキャンプは楽しいでござる！の巻 | |
| 28 | The Great Escape Strategy | 脱出大作戦でござるの巻 | |
| 29 | Keep Smiling! | いつもニコニコでござる！の巻 | |
| 29 | The Cake Disappeared Suddenly, Who Ate It? (The Cake Disappeared Suddenly, Who Did it?) | 犯人は誰？でござるの巻 | |
| 30 | Mama is on Strike! (Mommy is on Strike) | ママ上のストライキでござるの巻 | |
| 30 | Shishimaru is an Excellent Watchdog | 獅子丸は優秀な番犬でござるの巻 | |
| 31 | Retrieve the Washing! | 洗濯物を回収せよでござる！の巻 | |
| 31 | We Are Going to the Botanical Garden! | 植物園は楽しいでござる！の巻 | |
| 32 | Is Scouting Easy? (Netflix Title) | 偵察も大変でござるの巻 | |
| 32 | Releasing Dad's Stress! (Netflix Title) | 忍法童心帰りの術でござる！の巻 | |
| 33 | Shinzou and the Turtle Egg | シンゾウと亀の卵でござるの巻 | |
| 33 | Defeating Hattori-kun | 打倒ハットリくんでござるの巻 | |
| 34 | Respect the Food! (Netflix Title) | 好き嫌いはこりごりでござるの巻 | |
| 34 | Keeping an Eye on Yumeko! (Netflix Title) | 放課後の夢子ちゃんでござるの巻 | |
| 35 | Kenichi's Jogging Training! | ケンイチ氏のジョギング修行でござる！の巻 | |
| 35 | Kiyo's Static Electricity! (An Electric Cat is Tingly) | エレキャットはビリビリでござるの巻 | |
| 36 | The Ninja Love Flower is Scary | 忍法おもい花は恐ろしいでござるの巻 | |
| 36 | Don't Worry About Trifles | 細かいことは気にしないでござる！の巻 | |
| 37 | Mr. Koike Loves Butterflies | 蝶が大好き小池先生でござるの巻 | |
| 37 | A Foreign Ninja, Again! (A Foreign Ninja, Again?) | 外国忍者再び？でござるの巻 | |
| 38 | The Gift is a Strategy! (The Gift Strategy) | プレゼント大作戦でござる！の巻 | |
| 38 | Mama is an Inventor! (Mother is an Inventor) | ママ上は発明家でござるの巻 | |
| 39 | Shinzou's Kid Ninja Group | シンゾウのちびっこ忍者団でござるの巻 | |
| 39 | Victory or Defeat? | 負けるが勝ちでござるでござるの巻 | |
| 40 | Search for the Report Card | 通信簿を捜索せよ！でござるの巻 | |
| 40 | Where is Kenichi's Report Card? (Netflix Title) | 通信簿を捜索せよ！でござるの巻 | |
| 40 | Trace the Mystery of the Seven Wonders! (Trace the Mysteries of the Seven Wonders!) | 七不思議の謎を追えでござる！の巻 | |
| 41 | Good Deeds Make You Feel Well! | 良い行いは気持ちいいでござるの巻 | |
| 41 | Let's Look For the Phantom Swordsmith! | 伝説の刀鍛冶でござる！の巻 | |
| 42 | Who Will Be the Next Beautification Delegate? | 美化委員の座は誰のもの！？でござるの巻 | |
| 42 | Shishimaru is a Bird! | 鳥になった獅子丸でござるの巻 | |
| 43 | We Also Train on Rainy Days! | 雨の日も修行でござるの巻 | |
| 43 | The Decisive Battle Against the Giant Squid! | 決戦！巨大イカでござるの巻 | |
| 44 | Kiyo's Conscience! | 影千代の良心でござるの巻 | Kemumaki makes a flashback episode. |
| 44 | Kenichi is Treasure Hunting! (Kenichi's Treasure Hunting!) | お宝を探せでござる！の巻 | |
| 45 | What is a Ninja-Monja? | ニンジャモンジャって何じゃ？でござるの巻 | |
| 45 | Shishimaru's Diet! | 獅子丸のダイエットでござるの巻 | |
| 46 | Let's Beat the Kangaroo Boxer! | カンガルーボクサーを倒せでござる！の巻 | |
| 46 | Shishimaru's Pet Contest! | 獅子丸のオシャレコンテストでござるの巻 | |
| 47 | Yumeko's Self-defence! | 夢子殿の護身術でござるの巻 | |
| 47 | Message Bamboo Pipe! | 伝言竹筒で大げんかでござるの巻 | |
| 48 | Kenichi's Scary Night! | ケンイチ氏恐怖の一夜でござる！の巻 | |
| 48 | Kenichi Shines Brightly! | キラリと光るでござるの巻 | |
| 49 | Let's Sneak into the Museum! | 博物館に忍び込むでござる！の巻 | |
| 49 | A Mysterious Hot Spring Inn! | 不思議な温泉旅館でござるの巻 | |
| 50 | Yumeko's House is Far Away! | 夢子殿の家が遠いでござるの巻 | |
| 50 | Down with the Rats in the Mitsuba's House! | 三葉家のネズミ退治でござる!の巻 | |
| 51 | Today is a Good Day for a Giant Flying Squirrel! | 本日はムササビ日和でござるの巻 | |
| 51 | Kenichi's Ninja Film! | ケンイチ氏の忍者映画でござるの巻 | |
| 52 | Mr. Koike's Date! | 小池先生ついにデートでござる？！の巻 | |
| 52 | A Disguised Strategy For a Date! | 変装大作戦でデートでござる！の巻 | |

=== Season 3 ===
| EP# | English title | Japanese title |
|---|---|---|
| 53 | Hospitality for Dad! | パパ上をおもてなしでござるの巻 |
| 53 | The Lunchbox is Only for Feelings! | お弁当は命がけでござるの巻 |
| 54 | Super Excited Kenichi! | とにかく明るいケン一氏でござるの巻 |
| 54 | Cleaning it Neat and Tidy! | 片付けてスッキリでござるの巻 |
| 55 | The Hula Hoop Contest! | 輪っかでフラフラでござるの巻 |
| 55 | Daddy Goes to India! | 出張の準備は完璧でござるの巻 |
| 56 | Performing in Costumes is Hard! | 着ぐるみはツライでござるの巻 |
| 56 | Alone is House, Not My Cup of Tea! [sic] | お留守番を満喫するでござるの巻 |
| 57 | Shishimaru vs. Kiyo! | 走れ獅子丸でござるの巻 |
| 57 | Mushroom Picking Day! | マツタケのおかげでござるの巻 |
| 58 | We Should Respect Grandmother's Work! | 孫は来て良し、また来て良しでござるの巻 |
| 58 | I Dislike Mommy! | ママ上なんて大嫌いでござるの巻 |
| 59 | High Tech Helmet! | ハイテク頭巾は手強いでござるの巻 |
| 59 | Shishimaru Became Shadow! | 影丸になった獅子丸でござるの巻 |
| 60 | Dancing Raindrops! | 忍法雨だれの舞いでござるの巻 |
| 60 | Let Us Catch the Warrior Thief! | 忍者泥棒を捕まえろ！の巻 |
| 61 | Keep Quiet, Keep Quiet, Dad is Working! | 静かな静かな三葉家でござるの巻 |
| 61 | Walking is Exhausting! | お散歩はヘトヘトでござるの巻 |
| 62 | Going Through Hardship for a Buddhist Prayer! | 願掛けは苦労するでござるの巻 |
| 62 | True Identity of Fish-Based, Egg-Shaped Dog! | チクワ犬の正体をあばけでござるの巻 |
| 63 | Parents' Day Without Papa! | パパ上のいない授業参観でござるの巻 |
| 63 | We Caught a Lottery! | 宝くじが当たったでござるの巻 |
| 64 | Rely on the Smartphone! | スマートホンにお任せでござるの巻 |
| 64 | I Want a Ninja Princess! | 憧れの忍者プリンセスでござるの巻 |
| 65 | Oh, I Miss My Sword, I Misplaced it! | 刀がないと落ち着かないでござるの巻 |
| 65 | The Importance of Art! | 絵心は大切でござるの巻 |
| 66 | Aiko Teacher is Moving to a New House! | 愛子先生のお引っ越しでござるの巻 |
| 66 | Mama Must Be a Ninja, Let's Find Out! | ママ上は忍者に違いないでござるの巻 |
| 67 | Has Shinzou Disappeared? Let's Find Out! | シンゾウの姿は見えないでござるの巻 |
| 67 | A Costly Animation Film! | おもしろ動画は大掛かりでござるの巻 |
| 68 | Let's Fastforward Kenichi With a Ninja Art! | 忍法早送りの術でござるの巻 |
| 68 | Kemumaki's Injury! | ケムマキの怪我でござるの巻 |
| 69 | Something Important is Missing! | 大事にしまい過ぎたでござるの巻 |
| 69 | Ninja Technique of Animal Power! | 忍法なりきり動物の術でござるの巻 |
| 70 | Kiyo and Kitten Kitty! | 影千代と豆千代でござるの巻 |
| 70 | They Want to Find Out Yumeko's Secret! | 夢子殿と拙者の秘密でござるの巻 |
| 71 | Shishimaru is Going to Become a Ninja Doggy! | はぐれ忍者犬と獅子丸でござるの巻 |
| 71 | Will Kenichi Be Able to Finish His Work? | ぬりたてセメント砦でござるの巻 |
| 72 | Yumeko Has a Unique Experience! | 忍法打ち上げ花火でござるの巻 |
| 72 | Shinzou Has Become Really Naughty! Come and Let's See What Happens! | 本音香は危険でござるの巻 |
| 73 | A Guest Came to See Me! Let's See What Happens! | アレと一緒にお留守番でござるの巻 |
| 73 | Practice Makes You Perfect! | バレずに忍法忍び足でござる巻 |
| 74 | Shinzou's Double Sound Technique! | 忍法千の耳の修業でござるの巻 |
| 74 | Kenichi Wants to Sleep! | 眠っていたいケン一氏でござるの巻 |
| 75 | Kemumaki Tries to Make a UFO Vessel! | 未知との遭遇でござるの巻 |
| 75 | Little Shinzou's Amazing Ninja Technique! | 涙パワーでみんな止まった。の巻 |
| 76 | The Useful Shishi-Robo! | シシロボは便利でござるの巻 |
| 76 | Renovation of Mitsuba's House! | 三葉家のリフォームでござるの巻 |
| 77 | Mama's Homemade Vegetable Garden! | ママ上の家庭菜園でござるの巻 |
| 77 | Our Kenichi Has Gotten Himself Into Trouble! | つるり油でハッケヨイでござるの巻 |
| 78 | Shinzou Became Sad and Kemumaki Troubled Him! | シンゾウと獅子丸の便利屋でござるの巻 |
| 78 | Hattori Has a Loss Memory, Everyone in the House Gets Worried! | 拙者、記憶喪失でござるの巻 |

=== Season 4 ===
| EP# | English title | Japanese title | |
|---|---|---|---|
| 79 | The Chestnut Picking Battle! | 栗拾い大合戦でござるの巻 | |
| 79 | A Disciple From France! | フランスから来た弟子でござるの巻 | |
| 80 | We Have to Protect Aiko Teacher! | アイ子先生をお守りするでござるの巻 | |
| 80 | The 3 Fools of Iga! | ずっこけ伊賀の三人衆でござるの巻 | |
| 81 | Ninjas Communicate through Smoke Signals! | 忍者はのろしで伝えるでござるの巻 | |
| 81 | Today, I Take a Break from Ninja Training! | 本日拙者、休ニン日でござるの巻 | |
| 82 | Kiyo's Repayment! | 影千代の恩返しでござるの巻 | |
| 82 | The Flying Ninja Gum! | 空飛ぶ忍者ガムでござるの巻 | |
| 83 | Meet the Female Ninja of Koga! | 甲賀のくノ一見参!の巻 | |
| 83 | A Kite Fight Turns into a Tournament! | けんか凧で大げんかでござるの巻 | |
| 84 | Let's Stay Underground! | 地下に泊まろうでござるの巻 | |
| 84 | The Bamboo Horse Ninja Fight! | 竹馬忍者合戦でござるの巻 | |
| 85 | A Splendid Ninja Drone! | 恐るべし忍者ドローンでござるの巻 | |
| 85 | We Help Each Other Through Thick and Thin, That's How it's Always Been! | はたらく伊賀の三人衆でござるの巻 | |
| 86 | Ninja Sales Demonstration! | 忍者の実演販売でござるの巻 | |
| 86 | Shinzou's Perfection! | シンゾウ、最近絶好調でござるの巻 | |
| 87 | Ninja Class on Road Traffic Safety! | 忍者の交通安全教室でござるの巻 | |
| 87 | Don't Send the Love Letter! | ラブレターを届けるなでござるの巻 | |
| 88 | Shinzou Wants to Enter in Our Group! | シンゾウ、仲間に入りたいの巻 | |
| 88 | Following the Flute Sound! | オカリナの音色を追え!の巻 | |
| 89 | Shishimaru's Training! | 獅子丸を鍛え直すでござるの巻 | |
| 89 | One Photograph, Please! | 芸能人と写真を撮りたいでござるの巻 | |
| 90 | I Don't Want to be a Class Representative! | 学級委員になりたくないでござるの巻 | |
| 90 | The Prohibition of Ninja Tools! | 忍者道具は禁止でござるの巻 | |
| 91 | The Cap and Ball Competition! | 熱闘けん玉大会でござるの巻 | |
| 91 | Shinzou Becomes The Strong Millionaire Boy! | シンゾウはわらしべ長者でござるの巻 | |
| 92 | Ninja Snowball Fight! | 忍者雪合戦でござるの巻 | |
| 92 | Skiing is a Fun Sport! | スキーはお騒がせでござるの巻 | |
| 93 | The Letter of Challenge! | 果たし状が渡せないでござるの巻 | |
| 93 | Shinzou's Heavy Weight Training! | シンゾウの重たい修行でござるの巻 | |
| 94 | The Beach Café Business! | 海の家は大繁盛でござるの巻 | |
| 94 | Hattori's Violent Sneeze! | 拙者のくしゃみは大暴風でござるの巻 | |
| 95 | The House Needs to be Cleaned! | お掃除、伊賀の三人衆でござるの巻 | |
| 95 | Is Our Guest a Boon or a Bane? Let's Find Out! | お客様はいつまでもでござるの巻 | |
| 96 | Kemumaki Learns to Exercise! | 拙者に会えば痩せるでござるの巻 | |
| 96 | A Day with a Popstar! | 会いたかったアイドルでござるの巻 | |
| 97 | Stay Away from Deceit! | オレオレ忍者にご用心でござるの巻 | |
| 97 | Koike Teacher's Marriage Proposal! | 小池先生は婚活中でござるの巻 | |
| 98 | Ninjas Too Have Misunderstandings! | 誤解されて誤解するでござるの巻 | |
| 98 | A Holiday in Hawaii! | ハワイに行ってみようでござるの巻 | |
| 99 | A Ninja from India! | インドから忍者がやってきたでござるの巻 | |
| 99 | Shishimaru Leaves the House! | 今家出するところでござるの巻 | |
| 100 | Kiyo Gets Into Trouble! | 影千代、危機一髪でござるの巻 | |
| 100 | Mommy's Little Girl! | 三葉家の娘でござるの巻 | |
| 101 | A Bowl Worth a Million! | これは見事な茶碗でござるの巻 | |
| 101 | Shinzou Wants a Room of His Own! | シンゾウの部屋が出来たでござるの巻 | |
| 102 | Yumeko is Late for Her Piano Performance! | ピアノの発表会に急ぐでござるの巻 | |
| 102 | Detective Mommy! | ママ上は名探偵でござるの巻 | |
| 103 | Scared You Should Not be! | ビックリしてはいかんでござるの巻 | |
| 103 | Momonbe, The Flying Squirrel! | モモンべエがやって来たでござるの巻 | |
| 104 | The Good Luck Charm at the Invisible Ink! | おまじないで仲直りでござるの巻 | |
| 104 | Goodbye, Kenichi! | 父上、母上、おなつかしゅうござるの巻 | Hattori's Mom and Dad are in Debut. |

=== Season 5 ===
| EP# | English title | Japanese title | |
|---|---|---|---|
| 105 | Helping Others is a Best Job! | やる事なす事良い事でござるの巻 | |
| 105 | Octopus and Squids Fighting! | タコ墨の術対イカ墨の術でござるの巻 | |
| 106 | Fire Training Practice! | 三葉家の防災訓練でござるの巻 | |
| 106 | Kenichi Learns Swimming! | 水泳の特訓でござるの巻 | |
| 107 | Kemumaki Uses the Ninja Whistle Technique! | 忍法封印で生活改善でござるの巻 | |
| 107 | Teaching Roadways to Isa Yohi! | 方向音痴の道しるべでござるの巻 | |
| 108 | Finding Ninja Scroll of Massage! | フリマで売られた巻物でござるの巻 | |
| 108 | Making Food by Kung-fu and Karate! | 熱烈！カンフー対忍術でござるの巻 | |
| 109 | Shinzou Helps in Cleaning the House! | 忍法で大掃除でござるの巻 | |
| 109 | Water Problem in the Mitsuba's House! | 断水で困ったでござるの巻 | |
| 110 | Shishimaru Becomes a Cute Bear! | 熊になった獅子丸の巻 | |
| 110 | To Make Mommy Happy! | ママ上のご機嫌アップ作戦の巻 | |
| 111 | Ninja Technique of Smell! | 忍法ニオイ集めでござるの巻 | |
| 111 | Koike Sir's Honor Becomes a Winner! | 恋を掴むボルダリングでござるの巻 | |
| 112 | Finding Kemumaki's Weakness! | ケムマキはアレが弱点の巻 | |
| 112 | Hattori Bent His Neck! | 骨をはずしすぎたでござるの巻 | |
| 113 | Making Waste Things Into a Material! | 忍法ゴミ分別でござるの巻 | |
| 113 | Ninja Technique of Spinning! | まわれ！忍者コマ合戦の巻 | |
| 114 | Ninja Technique of Spider Web! | 寝違えたでござるの巻 | |
| 114 | Will Kenichi Conceal His Bag? Let's Find Out! | ママ上から隠し通すでござるの巻 | |
| 115 | Kenichi's Day Shift Work! | ケン一氏は日直でござるの巻 | |
| 115 | Ninja Technique of Exercise! | 我が家は運動からくり屋敷でござるの巻 | |
| 116 | Ninja Fever and Illness! | 忍者風邪にご用心でござるの巻 | |
| 116 | Exercise with the Ninja Duck Technique! | 歩き出したら止められないでござるの巻 | |
| 117 | Watching Sunset in a Hill Station! | 一度は撮りたい絶景写真でござるの巻 | |
| 117 | Kiyo Fails in His Silence Walk! | またまたまたまた忍び足の巻 | |
| 118 | Troubled By a Hamster! | ハムスターが逃げたでござるの巻 | |
| 118 | Is Dad's Dog Allergy? Let's Find Out! | パパ上のくしゃみが止まらないでござるの巻 | |
| 119 | Will Kemumaki Click Hattori's Ugly Face? Let's Find Out! | ロボット掃除機に襲われるでござるの巻 | |
| 119 | Will Shinzou Apply Eye Drops on Hattori? Let's Find Out! | 目薬を避けてしまうでござるの巻 | |
| 120 | Shishimaru and Kiyo's World Record! | 世界ー遠くへ飛ぶでござるの巻 | Kenichi was absent in this episode. |
| 120 | Hattori's Balancing Training! | 甘くて苦い試練でござるの巻 | |
| 121 | Ninja Bamboo Flying Drone Fan! | 竹トンボは色鮮やかでござるの巻 | |
| 121 | Car Navigator in the Driving! | カーナビとドライブでござるの巻 | |
| 122 | Solving The Mystery of Mommy's Anger! | 仲直りはパパ上からでござるの巻 | |
| 122 | Kenichi Builds a Candyhouse! | わたあめの家を作るでござるの巻 | |
| 123 | We Went to a Zombie's House! | こんなゾンビは嫌だ！でござるの巻 | |
| 123 | We Should Not be Scared of Aliens! | こんな宇宙人は嫌だ！でござるの巻 | |
| 124 | Fishing Competition with Score! | 金魚すくい名人になりたいでござるの巻 | |
| 124 | Shinzou's Memory Story! | シンゾウの記憶力でござるの巻 | |
| 125 | Shishimaru Becomes a Blue Bird! | 青い鳥はいずこ？でござるの巻 | |
| 125 | Shishimaru Wants to Become Popular in Social Media! | カワイイ犬になりたいでござるの巻 | |
| 126 | Kemumaki's Ninja Flower! | ほれぼれ花でほれぼれでござるの巻 | |
| 126 | Darkness Walk Inside a Cave! | 真っ暗闇で修行でござるの巻 | |
| 127 | Shinzou Learns the Ninja Signal! | 伝わらない暗号でござるの巻 | |
| 127 | Super Intelligent Boy! | 生き物博士クンでござるの巻 | |
| 128 | Mission of the Ninja Hawk Scroll! | 鷹から手紙が奪われたでござるの巻 | |
| 128 | Kemumaki Becomes a Scary Mask Lady! | 忍怖の都市伝説でござるの巻 | |
| 129 | Connecting Cup with String Telephone! | 糸電話を繋げたいでござるの巻 | |
| 129 | Mommy Becomes a Small Child! | ママ上はおてんばでござるの巻 | |
| 130 | Kiyo is Troubled by Another Cat! | ケムマキの家に猫二匹でござるの巻 | |
| 130 | Kemumaki's Dance Trouble! | 洋刀ハルサメを手に入れたでござるの巻 | |

=== Season 6 ===
| EP# | English title | Japanese title |
|---|---|---|
| 131 | The Mission of Saving the Nest! | ツバメの巣を守るでござるの巻 |
| 131 | Watching Shooting Stars with a Set Up! | プラネタリウムを作るでござるの巻 |
| 132 | Kemumaki's Ninja Flying Technique! | 忍法ムササビを超えたいでござるの巻 |
| 132 | Mommy's Back Pain! | シンゾウ、獅子丸、家事代行の巻 |
| 133 | Ice Skating in Oil Mat! | 氷の上をスイスイでござるの巻 |
| 133 | Koike Sir is in Trouble! | あっちこっちに落し物でござるの巻 |
| 134 | Will Shinzou Make Hattori Calm? Let's Find Out! | 厳しい人にはやわらか餅でござるの巻 |
| 134 | Searching for a Four Leaf Clover! | 四つ葉のクローバーを探すでござるの巻 |
| 135 | Shaving Shishimaru's Hair! | 獅子丸の散髪でござるの巻 |
| 135 | When Sticking Gum Becomes a Trouble! | 化粧のノリが良すぎたでござるの巻 |
| 136 | Heart is the Truth but His Face is a Liar! | 本音が知りたいでござるの巻 |
| 136 | Shinzou's Targeting Practice! | 忍法気合い砲でござるの巻 |
| 137 | Shinzou's Ninja Different Voices! | 忍法音写しは楽しいでござるの巻 |
| 137 | Making Things from Paper Origami! | シンゾウの道具は折り紙でござるの巻 |
| 138 | Planning for Catching a Thief! | お年寄りハンターを捕まえろ！の巻 |
| 138 | The Cute Baby Learns to Become a Great Ninja! | 忍法を使う赤ちゃん？の巻 |
| 139 | Performing Music of a Wind Bell! | 風鈴を奏でるでござるの巻 |
| 139 | Kenichi Practices for Sword Fighting! | 少年剣士、三葉ケン一でござるの巻 |
| 140 | Kemumaki's Bad Luck! | ケムマキ、史上最悪の日でござるの巻 |
| 140 | Shinzou's Flying Paper Fan! | 少年とシンゾウの風車でござるの巻 |
| 141 | Searching for Yumeko's Dog with Kenichi's Calligraphy! | 書の道も一歩からでござるの巻 |
| 141 | Winner Winner Shinzou is the Winner! | たか〜い下駄で競争でござるの巻 |
| 142 | Kiyo's Super Electrical Magnetical Power! | 新忍法マグキャットでござるの巻 |
| 142 | We Should Maintain Cleanliness in the House! | 手ごわい客が来たでござるの巻 |
| 143 | Kemumaki Builds a Strongest Armour! | ケムマキの忍び甲冑でござるの巻 |
| 143 | Who is the Best in the Photography News? Kenichi or Kemumaki? | ケン一氏、スクープを追うでござるの巻 |
| 144 | Searching for Mom Seal's Child! | 迷子のアザラシを救え！でござるの巻 |
| 144 | Mommy's Collection of the Capsule Toys! | カプセルトイを集めるでござるの巻 |
| 145 | The Trip to the Snow Place! | 忍者雪かき隊参上でござるの巻 |
| 145 | Mr. Snowman Becomes a Gentleman! | 雪だるまさん、こんにちはの巻 |
| 146 | Kenichi and Kemumaki Finds Yumeko's Grandma's Mechanical Book. | からくり扉を開けるでござるの巻 |
| 146 | Kemumaki's Training in the Forest. | 野宿なんて怖くないの巻 |
| 147 | Hattori's Ninja Cleaning Technique. | 忍法ピッカピカの術でござるの巻 |
| 147 | Shinzou and Shishimaru Performs an Awesome Stunts. | 傘まわしで福を呼ぶでござるの巻 |
| 148 | Daddy is Lost in the Forest! | ゴルフ場で迷子のパパ上の巻 |
| 148 | Shinzou Tries to Improve a Stiching Design's for the Clothes! | シンゾウのアップリケでござるの巻 |
| 149 | Yumeko and Isa Yohi Are Best Friends! | 十六夜殿の引退宣言でござるの巻 |
| 149 | Shinzou Learns the Ninja Shadow Technique! | 忍法もぐり影で帰宅中の巻 |
| 150 | Kemumaki Becomes a Devil! | ママ上は妖怪かもしれないの巻 |
| 150 | Shinzou's Ninja Technique Creates Kenichi in Trouble! | らくがきは蝶のように舞うの巻 |
| 151 | Kemumaki's Robotic Frog! | カエルはぐるぐるを狙うの巻 |
| 151 | Kemumaki's Target for the Golden Book! | 庭に干してる秘伝書を狙えの巻 |
| 152 | Kemumaki and Kiyo Got Trapped! | 床に足をつけるな！の巻 |
| 152 | Kemumaki's Machine Jumbo Fan! | 最強？巨大からくり扇風機でござるの巻 |
| 153 | The Different Butterfly Got Escaped! | 大事な蝶々が逃げちゃったの巻 |
| 153 | I'm Tied Up and I'm Spinning! | 金縛りでたらい回しでござるの巻 |
| 154 | What Did Kemumaki Want Hattori's Older Brother? Let's Find Out! | ケムマキ氏が兄上でござるの巻 |
| 154 | Hattori is Making a Sumo! | どすこい！ハットリ部屋でござるの巻 |
| 155 | Rickshaw at a Princess Parade! | 人力車お姫様パレードでござるの巻 |
| 155 | Ball Riding Game is Just Serious! | 玉乗り真剣勝負でござるの巻 |
| 156 | Hattori is Getting Out of Here! | ハットリくんが出て行ったの巻 |
| 156 | We'll Get Delivery Pizza Relay! | 全 力！宅配ピザリレーでござるの巻 |
