= List of anime series by episode count =

This is a list of anime series by episode count, with television series of at least 100 episodes, OVA series of at least 20 episodes, and ONA series of at least 20 episodes.

== Televised series ==
This is a list of anime television series by episode count for series with a minimum of 100 episodes. Note that anime franchises with multiple television series are not listed on this page. Anime in Japan has a practice of naming seasons under their own separate title instead of by cours. This article will only cover series without distinct season names.

No.	Series title	Started broadcasting	Finished broadcasting	Episode count	Runtime
1	Sazae-san	October 5, 1969	Currently in production	2,853 (Note: Each weekly airing of Sazae-san consists of three separate episodes. The episode count includes specials.)	20–26 minutes
2	Nintama Rantarō	April 10, 1993	Currently in production	2,668 (Note: There are 25 "series" which are part of the overall Nintama Rantarō series. This page lists all the episode titles.)	10 minutes
3	Ojarumaru	October 5, 1998	Currently in production	2,157 (Note: The episodes are split into 27 "series")	10 minutes
4	Doraemon (1979)	April 2, 1979	March 18, 2005	1,787	11 minutes
5	Soreike! Anpanman	October 3, 1988	Currently in production	1,753	20–26 minutes
6	Oyako Club	October 3, 1994	March 30, 2013	1,667	5 minutes
7	Kirin no Monoshiri Yakata	January 1, 1975	December 31, 1979	1,565	5 minutes
8	Chibi Maruko-chan	January 8, 1995	Currently in production	1,543	20–26 minutes
9	Kirin Ashita no Calendar	January 1, 1980	December 30, 1984	1,498	5 minutes
10	Manga Nippon Mukashi Banashi	January 7, 1975	January 2, 1995	1,494 (Note: 24 TV episodes from the 1975 series, 1470 TV episodes from the 1976 series)	20–26 minutes
11	Hoka Hoka Kazoku	October 1, 1976	March 31, 1982	1,428	5 minutes
12	Crayon Shin-chan	April 13, 1992	Currently in production	1,358	20–26 minutes
13	Monoshiri Daigaku Ashita no Calendar	July 1, 1966	August 2, 1970	1,274	5 minutes
14	Case Closed	January 8, 1996	Currently in production	1,209	20–26 minutes
15	One Piece	October 20, 1999	Currently in production	1,180	20–26 minutes
16	Sekai Monoshiri Ryokō	October 1, 1971	December 31, 1974	1,006	5 minutes
17	Doraemon (2005)	April 15, 2005	Currently in production	927	20–26 minutes
18	Kotowaza House	April 4, 1987	September 28, 1994	773	5 minutes
19	Hanakappa	March 29, 2010	Currently in production	751	10 minutes
20	Asadayo!Kaishain	April 4, 2016	March 29, 2019	744	1 minute
21	Shima Shima Tora no Shimajirō	December 13, 1993	March 31, 2008	726	20–26 minutes
22	Shimajiro no Wao!	April 2, 2012	Currently in production	713	8 minutes
23	Ninja Hattori-kun	September 28, 1981	December 25, 1987	696	10 minutes
24	Bonobono (2016)	March 7, 2016	Currently in production	537	5 minutes
25	Perman	April 4, 1983	July 2, 1985	526	12 minutes
26	Obake no Q-tarō	April 1, 1985	March 29, 1987	510	15 minutes
27	Naruto: Shippuden	February 15, 2007	March 23, 2017	500	20–26 minutes
28	Morning Ninja team Gatchaman	April 18, 2011	March 29, 2013	475	1 minute
29	Puzzle & Dragons	April 2, 2018	Currently in production	403	20–26 minutes
30	Cooking Idol I! My! Mine!	March 30, 2009	March 29, 2013	400	10 minutes
31	Chiikawa	April 4, 2022	Currently in production	382	1 minutes
32	KochiKame: Tokyo Beat Cops	June 16, 1996	December 19, 2004	373	20–26 minutes
33	Bleach	October 5, 2004	March 27, 2012	366	20–26 minutes
33	Kirin Monoshiri Daiquiri: Manga Bushiness	August 3, 1970	September 30, 1971	366	5 minutes
34	Charady no Joke na Mainichi	April 1, 2009	March 30, 2010	365	3 minutes
35	Sgt. Frog	April 3, 2004	April 3, 2011	358	20–26 minutes
36	Kiteretsu Daihyakka	March 27, 1988	June 9, 1996	331	20–26 minutes
37	Atashin'chi	April 19, 2002	September 19, 2009	330	20–26 minutes
38	Fairy Tail	October 12, 2009	September 29, 2019	328	20–26 minutes
39	Instant History	May 1, 1961	February 24, 1962	312	3 minutes
40	Manga Hajimete Monogatari	May 6, 1978	March 31, 1984	305	20–26 minutes
41	Hyppo and Thomas	January 1, 1971	September 30, 1972	300	3 minutes
42	Hamtaro	July 7, 2000	March 31, 2006	296	20–26 minutes
42	Ikkyū-san	October 15, 1975	June 28, 1982	296	20–26 minutes
43	Boruto: Naruto Next Generations	April 5, 2017	March 26, 2023	293	20–26 minutes
44	Dragon Ball Z	April 26, 1989	January 31, 1996	291	20–26 minutes
45	Dotanba no Manners	October 3, 1984	April 9, 1987	283	5 minutes
46	Pokémon (1997 series)	April 1, 1997	November 14, 2002	276	24 minutes
47	Gan to Gon	April 5, 1974	August 13, 1975	260	5 minutes
47	Hoshi no Ko Poron	April 1, 1974	March 21, 1975	260	5 minutes
48	Folktales from Japan	April 1, 2012	March 26, 2017	258	20–26 minutes
49	A Penguin's Troubles	April 5, 2008	March 30, 2013	253	10 minutes
50	Dr. Slump Arale-chan	April 8, 1981	February 19, 1986	243	20–26 minutes
50	Good Morning!!! DORONJO	March 30, 2015	March 25, 2016	243	1 minute
51	Ninjala	January 8, 2022	Currently in production	241	20–26 minutes
52	Itazura tenshi Chippo-chan	March 30, 1970	December 31, 1970	240	5 minutes
53	Ohayo The Genie Family	March 31, 2014	March 27, 2015	237	1 minute
54	Mazinger ZIP	April 8, 2013	March 28, 2014	227	1 minute
55	Miracle! Mimika	April 3, 2006	March 27, 2009	225	10 minutes
56	Yu-Gi-Oh! Duel Monsters	April 18, 2000	September 29, 2004	224	20–26 minutes
57	Naruto	October 3, 2002	February 8, 2007	220	20–26 minutes
58	Yo-kai Watch	January 8, 2014	March 30, 2018	214	20–26 minutes
59	Yamishibai: Japanese Ghost Stories	July 15, 2013	Currently in production	208	5 minutes
60	Katekyō Hitman Reborn!	October 7, 2006	September 25, 2010	203	20–26 minutes
61	Gintama	April 4, 2006	March 25, 2010	201	20–26 minutes
61	Ojamajo Doremi	February 9, 1999	January 26, 2003	201	20–26 minutes
62	Holly the Ghost	January 28, 1991	April 12, 1993	200	10 minutes
62	Parasol Henbee	October 2, 1989	January 28, 1991	200	10 minutes
62	Sailor Moon	March 7, 1992	February 8, 1997	200	20–26 minutes
63	Gatapishi	April 2, 1990	March 29, 1991	199	10 minutes
64	Let's Go COOKR'n	April 1, 2013	March 20, 2015	196	10 minutes
65	Tamagon the Counselor	October 5, 1972	September 28, 1973	195	5 minutes
65	Urusei Yatsura (1981)	October 14, 1981	March 19, 1986	195	20–26 minutes
66	Astro Boy (1963)	January 1, 1963	December 31, 1966	193	20–26 minutes
66	Inuyasha	October 16, 2000	March 29, 2010	193	20–26 minutes
67	Pokemon: Ruby and Sapphire series	November 21, 2002	September 14, 2006	192	20–26 minutes
68	Pokémon: Diamond and Pearl series	September 28, 2006	September 9, 2010	191	20–26 minutes
69	Star of the Giants	March 30, 1968	September 18, 1971	182 (Note: This count consists of the original 182-episode Star of the Giants series)	20–26 minutes
70	Yu-Gi-Oh! GX	October 6, 2004	March 26, 2008	180	20–26 minutes
71	Aikatsu!	October 8, 2012	March 31, 2016	178	20–26 minutes
71	The Prince of Tennis	October 10, 2001	March 30, 2005	178	20–26 minutes
72	Black Clover	October 3, 2017	Currently in production	176	20–26 minutes
73	Zenmai Zamurai	April 3, 2006	March 26, 2010	175	5 minutes
74	Mirmo!	April 6, 2002	September 27, 2005	172	20–26 minutes
75	Chirorin Mura Monogatari	April 6, 1992	March 19, 1993	170	10 minutes
75	Pokonyan!	April 5, 1993	March 29, 1996	170	10 minutes
75	Yadamon	August 24, 1992	July 16, 1993	170	10 minutes
76	Dragon Ball Z Kai	April 5, 2009	June 28, 2015	167 (Note: International episode count is listed; The Japanese count of the series is 159 episodes)	20–26 minutes
77	Obocchama-kun	January 14, 1989	September 26, 1992	164	20–26 minutes
78	Dokaben	October 6, 1976	December 26, 1979	163	20–26 minutes
78	Hai! Akko Desu	October 12, 1988	March 26, 1992	163	20–26 minutes
79	Sobakasu Pucchi!	March 31, 1969	October 4, 1969	162	5 minutes
80	Ranma ½ (1989)	April 15, 1989	September 25, 1992	161	20–26 minutes
81	Bōken Shōnen Shadar	September 18, 1967	March 16, 1968	156	10 minutes
81	Chō Tokkyū Hikarian	April 2, 1997	March 29, 2000	156	7 minutes
81	Odenkun	August 4, 2005	February 27, 2009	156	7 minutes
81	Otoko do-Ahou! Koushien	September 28, 1970	March 27, 1971	156	10 minutes
81	Otoko Ippiki Gaki Daishou	September 29, 1969	March 28, 1970	156	10 minutes
81	Pinch to Punch	September 29, 1969	March 28, 1970	156	5 minutes
81	Urikupen Kyūjotai	September 30, 1974	March 29, 1975	156	5 minutes
82	Kingdom	June 4, 2012	Currently in production	155	20–26 minutes
82	Lupin the 3rd Part II	October 3, 1977	October 6, 1980	155	20–26 minutes
83	Major	November 13, 2004	September 25, 2010	154	20–26 minutes
83	Yu-Gi-Oh! 5D's	April 2, 2008	March 30, 2011	154	20–26 minutes
84	Bakusō Kyōdai Let's & Go!!	January 8, 1996	December 21, 1998	153	20–26 minutes
84	Dragon Ball	February 26, 1986	April 12, 1989	153	20–26 minutes
84	Kirarin Revolution	April 7, 2006	March 27, 2009	153	20–26 minutes
84	Kiratto Pri Chan	April 8, 2018	May 30, 2021	153	20–26 minutes
84	Pro Golfer Saru	April 2, 1985	March 28, 1988	153	20–26 minutes
85	Fist of the North Star	October 11, 1984	February 18, 1988	152	20–26 minutes
86	Cooking Papa	April 9, 1992	May 25, 1995	151	20–26 minutes
86	Tetsujin 28-go Gao	April 6, 2013	March 26, 2016	151	5 minutes
87	Zatch Bell!	April 6, 2003	March 26, 2006	150	20–26 minutes
87	Yu-Gi-Oh! Go Rush!!	April 3, 2022	March 30, 2025	150	20-26 minutes
88	Hunter × Hunter (2011)	October 2, 2011	September 24, 2014	148	20–26 minutes
88	The Kindaichi Case Files	April 7, 1997	September 11, 2000	148	20–26 minutes
88	Yu-Gi-Oh! Arc-V	April 6, 2014	March 26, 2017	148	20–26 minutes
88	Fushigi Dagashiya Zenitendō	September 8, 2020	March 14, 2025	148	9 minutes
89	Toriko	April 3, 2011	March 30, 2014	147	20–26 minutes
90	Pokemon: Sun & Moon series	November 17, 2016	November 3, 2019	146	20–26 minutes
91	Eyeshield 21	April 6, 2005	March 19, 2008	145	20–26 minutes
92	Tamagotchi!	October 12, 2009	September 3, 2012	143	20–26 minutes
93	PriPara	July 5, 2014	March 28, 2017	140	20–26 minutes
94	Beyblade X	October 6, 2023	Currently in production	139	24 minutes
94	Kamisama Minarai: Himitsu no Cocotama	October 1, 2015	June 28, 2018	139	20–26 minutes
95	Kinnikuman	April 3, 1983	October 1, 1986	137	20–26 minutes
96	Pokémon Journeys series	November 17, 2019	March 24, 2023	136	20–26 minutes
96	Oishinbo	October 17, 1988	March 17, 1992	136	20–26 minutes
96	Rilu Rilu Fairilu	February 6, 2016	January 5, 2019	136	20–26 minutes
97	Dragon Ball Super	July 5, 2015	March 25, 2018	131	20–26 minutes
98	Captain Tsubasa	October 13, 1983	March 27, 1986	128	20–26 minutes
99	Inazuma Eleven	October 5, 2008	April 27, 2011	127	20–26 minutes
99	Manga Fairy Tales of the World	October 7, 1976	March 28, 1979	127	20 minutes
99	Mīmu Iro Iro Yume no Tabi	April 3, 1983	September 29, 1985	127	20–26 minutes
100	Ace of Diamond	October 6, 2013	March 28, 2016	126	20–26 minutes
101	Yawara!	October 16, 1989	September 21, 1992	124	20–26 minutes
102	Yu-Gi-Oh! VRAINS	May 10, 2017	September 25, 2019	120	20–26 minutes
103	Esper Mami	April 7, 1987	October 26, 1989	119	20–26 minutes
104	Azuki-chan	April 4, 1995	March 17, 1998	117	20–26 minutes
104	Ultra B	April 4, 1987	March 27, 1989	117	10 minutes
105	D.Gray-man	October 3, 2006	September 27, 2016	116	20–26 minutes
106	Candy Candy	October 1, 1976	February 2, 1979	115	20–26 minutes
106	GeGeGe no Kitarō (1985)	October 12, 1985	March 21, 1988	115	20–26 minutes
106	Pikachin-Kit	January 6, 2018	March 28, 2020	115	20–26 minutes
107	Dororonpa!	April 8, 1991	September 27, 1991	114	5:30-10 minutes
107	GeGeGe no Kitarō (1996)	January 7, 1996	March 29, 1998	114	20–26 minutes
107	Saint Seiya	October 11, 1986	April 1, 1989	114	20–26 minutes
108	Galaxy Express 999	September 14, 1978	March 28, 1981	113	20–26 minutes
109	Tsuyoshi Shikkari Shinasai	October 4, 1992	December 25, 1994	112	20–26 minutes
109	Yu Yu Hakusho	October 10, 1992	January 7, 1995	112	20–26 minutes
110	Fisherman Sanpei	April 7, 1980	June 28, 1982	109	20–26 minutes
110	Sally the Witch	December 5, 1966	December 30, 1968	109	20–26 minutes
111	Yatterman	January 1, 1977	January 27, 1979	108	20–26 minutes
112	Science Ninja Team Gatchaman	October 1, 1972	September 29, 1974	105	20–26 minutes
112	Tiger Mask	October 2, 1969	September 30, 1971	105	20–26 minutes
113	Attack No. 1	December 7, 1969	November 28, 1971	104	20–26 minutes
113	Croket!	April 7, 2003	March 27, 2005	104	20–26 minutes
113	Di Gi Charat Nyo!	April 6, 2003	March 28, 2004	104	12 minutes
113	Inakappe Taishō	October 4, 1970	September 24, 1972	104	20–26 minutes
113	Moomin	April 12, 1990	March 26, 1992	104	20–26 minutes
113	Robotan	October 4, 1966	September 27, 1968	104	20–26 minutes
113	The Song of Tentomushi	October 6, 1974	September 26, 1976	104	20–26 minutes
114	Ganso Tensai Bakabon	October 6, 1975	September 26, 1977	103	20–26 minutes
114	The Gutsy Frog	October 7, 1972	September 28, 1974	103	20–26 minutes
114	Ojamanga Yamada-kun	September 28, 1980	October 10, 1982	103	20–26 minutes
115	Kodocha	April 5, 1996	March 27, 1998	102	20–26 minutes
115	MÄR	April 3, 2005	March 25, 2007	102	20–26 minutes
116	Guru Guru Town Hanamaru-kun	October 3, 1999	September 29, 2001	101	20–26 minutes
116	Slam Dunk	October 16, 1993	March 23, 1996	101	20–26 minutes
116	Touch	March 24, 1985	March 22, 1987	101	20–26 minutes
117	Aggretsuko (2016)	April 2, 2016	March 31, 2018	100	1 minute
117	Aikatsu Stars!	April 7, 2016	March 29, 2018	100	20–26 minutes
117	Coji-Coji	October 4, 1997	September 25, 1999	100	20–26 minutes
117	Dōbutsu-mura Monogatari	March 30, 1970	July 21, 1970	100	5 minutes
117	Dragon Quest: The Adventure of Dai (2020)	October 3, 2020	October 22, 2022	100	20–26 minutes
117	GeGeGe no Kitarō (2007)	April 1, 2007	March 29, 2009	100	20–26 minutes
117	Kirby: Right Back at Ya!	October 6, 2001	September 27, 2003	100	20–26 minutes

== Original video animation ==
This is a list of original video animation (OVA) series by episode count for series with a minimum of 20 episodes.

No.	Program Name	Started Broadcasting	Finished Broadcasting	Episode count
1	Legend of the Galactic Heroes	December 1988	March 1997	110
2	Legend of the Galactic Heroes; Side Stories	February 1998	July 2000	52
3	Konpeki no Kantai	February 1993	August 2003	32
4	Saint Seiya: Hades	November 2002	August 2008	31
5	Hunter × Hunter	January 2002	August 2004	30
5	Tenchi Muyo! Ryo-Ohki	September 1992	May 2021	30
6	Case Closed	March 2000	April 2012	27
7	Saint Seiya: The Lost Canvas	June 2009	July 2011	26
8	Tōma Kijinden ONI	October 1995	March 1996	25
9	Supernatural: The Animation	January 2011	April 2011	22

== Original net animation ==
This is a list of original net animation (ONA) series by episode count for series with a minimum of 20 episodes.

No.	Program Name	Started Broadcasting	Finished Broadcasting	Episode count
1	Puchimas!! Petit Petit Idolmaster	April 2014	June 2014	74
2	Puchimas! Petit Idolmaster	January 2013	March 2013	64
3	Beyblade Burst Rise	April 2019	March 2020	52
3	Beyblade Burst Surge	April 2020	March 2021	52
3	Beyblade Burst QuadDrive	April 2021	March 2022	52
3	Hetalia: Axis Powers	January 2009	March 2010	52
4	Aggretsuko	April 2018	February 2023	51
5	Hetalia: World Series	March 2010	March 2011	48
6	Mofusand the Animation	December 22, 2025	Currently in production	45
7	Overlord: Ple Ple Pleiades	September 25, 2015	July 26, 2022	44
8	Baki	June 2018	Currently in production	39
8	Sailor Moon Crystal	July 2014	June 2016	39
9	JoJo's Bizarre Adventure: Stone Ocean	December 2021	December 2022	38
10	Starry Sky	December 2010	June 2011	26
10	Xam'd: Lost Memories	July 2008	February 2009	26
11	The Melancholy of Haruhi-chan Suzumiya	February 2009	May 2009	25
11	Baki-Dou	February 2026	June 2026	25
12	Bonjour Sweet Love Patisserie	October 2014	March 2015	24
12	Magical Play	November 2001	May 2002	24
12	Petit Eva: Evangelion@School	March 2007	September 2007	24
12	Psychic Academy	March 2002	September 2002	24
13	Penguin Musume Heart	April 2008	November 2008	22
14	Hetalia: The Beautiful World	January 2013	June 2013	20
14	Kyō no Asuka Show	August 2012	January 2013	20

== See also ==
- List of animated television series by episode count
- List of manga series by volume count
- Lists of television programs by episode count
