= List of Overlord episodes =

Overlord episodes

Overlord is a Japanese anime television series based on the eponymous light novel series written by Kugane Maruyama and illustrated by so-bin. The series was produced by Madhouse under the direction of Naoyuki Itō, script composition by Yukie Sugawara, and music composed by Shūji Katayama. Overlord first aired in Japan on AT-X from July 7 to September 29, 2015, with additional broadcasts by Tokyo MX, Sun TV, KBS Kyoto, TV Aichi, and BS11.

The second season moved to MBS. The second season aired from January 10 to April 4, 2018. The third season aired from July 11 to October 2, 2018.

On May 8, 2021, a fourth season and an anime film were announced, with the film covering the Holy Kingdom Arc of the series. The fourth season aired from July 5 to September 27, 2022. The staff and cast members returned to reprise their roles for the fourth season.

== Series overview ==
Season	Episodes	Originally released	
Season	Episodes	First released	Last released
1	13	July 7, 2015	September 29, 2015
2	13	January 10, 2018	April 4, 2018
3	13	July 11, 2018	October 2, 2018
4	13	July 5, 2022	September 27, 2022

== Episodes ==
=== Season 1 (2015) ===
No. overall	No. in season	Title	Directed by	Written by	Original release date	Ref.
1	1	"End and Beginning"; Transliteration: "Owari to Hajimari" (Japanese: 終わりと始まり)	Kunihiro Wakabayashi	Yukie Sugawara	July 7, 2015	
2	2	"Floor Guardians"; Transliteration: "Kaisō shugo-sha" (Japanese: 階層守護者)	Shūji Miyazaki	Yukie Sugawara	July 14, 2015	
3	3	"The Battle of Carne Village"; Transliteration: "Karune-mura no tatakai" (Japanese: カルネ村の戦い)	Naoyuki Itō	Yukie Sugawara	July 21, 2015	
4	4	"Ruler of Death"; Transliteration: "Shi no shihai-sha" (Japanese: 死の支配者)	Masaki Matsumura	Yukie Sugawara	July 28, 2015	
5	5	"Two Adventurers"; Transliteration: "Futari no bōken-sha" (Japanese: 二人の冒険者)	Mihiro Yamaguchi	Yukie Sugawara	August 4, 2015	
6	6	"Journey"; Transliteration: "Tabiji" (Japanese: 旅路)	Ryōichi Kuratani	Yukie Sugawara	August 11, 2015	
7	7	"Wise King of Forest"; Transliteration: "Mori no ken-ō" (Japanese: 森の賢王)	Masayuki Ōzeki	Yukie Sugawara	August 18, 2015	
8	8	"Twin Swords of Slashing Death"; Transliteration: "Shi o kirisaku sōken" (Japanese: 死を切り裂く双剣)	Kunihiro Wakabayashi	Yukie Sugawara	August 25, 2015	
9	9	"The Dark Warrior"; Transliteration: "Shikkoku no senshi" (Japanese: 漆黒の戦士)	Masaki Matsumura	Yukie Sugawara	September 1, 2015	
10	10	"True Vampire"; Transliteration: "Shinso" (Japanese: 真祖)	Mihiro Yamaguchi	Yukie Sugawara	September 8, 2015	
11	11	"Confusion and Understanding"; Transliteration: "Konran to haaku" (Japanese: 混乱と把握)	Ryōichi Kuratani	Yukie Sugawara	September 15, 2015	
12	12	"The Bloody Valkyrie"; Transliteration: "Senketsu no ikusaotome" (Japanese: 鮮血の戦乙女)	Masaki Matsumura	Yukie Sugawara	September 22, 2015	
13	13	"Player VS Non Player Character" (Japanese: PVN)	Kunihiro Wakabayashi	Yukie Sugawara	September 29, 2015	

=== Season 2 (2018) ===
No. overall	No. in season	Title	Directed by	Written by	Original release date (Note: Tokyo MX listed the broadcast times as Tuesday nights at 24:30, meaning the first broadcast technically occurred on Wednesday at 12:30am JST. Dates in this article reflect the actual calendar date of the broadcast.)	Ref.
14	1	"The Dawn of Despair"; Transliteration: "Zetsubō no Makuake" (Japanese: 絶望の幕開け)	Tatsuya Shiraishi	Yukie Sugawara	January 10, 2018	
15	2	"Departure"; Transliteration: "Tabidachi" (Japanese: 旅立ち)	Naoyuki Itō; Kazu Terasawa	Yukie Sugawara	January 17, 2018	
16	3	"Lizard Men, Gathering"; Transliteration: "Tsudou, Rizādoman" (Japanese: 集う、蜥蜴人)	Hiro Soetakazu	Fūta Takei; Yukie Sugawara	January 24, 2018	
17	4	"Army of Death"; Transliteration: "Shi no Gunzei" (Japanese: 死の軍勢)	Tatsuya Shiraishi	Yukie Sugawara	January 31, 2018	
18	5	"The Freezing God"; Transliteration: "Hyōketsu no Bushin" (Japanese: 氷結の武神)	Kazuaki Terasawa	Yukie Sugawara	February 7, 2018	
19	6	"Those Who Pick Up, Those Who Are Picked Up"; Transliteration: "Hirou mono, Hirowa reru mono" (Japanese: 拾う者、拾われる者)	Akiko Nakano	Itsuki Yokoyama	February 14, 2018	
20	7	"Blue Roses"; Transliteration: "Aoi no Bara" (Japanese: 蒼の薔薇)	Kim Min Sun	Yukie Sugawara	February 21, 2018	
21	8	"A Boy's Feeling"; Transliteration: "Shōnen no Omoi" (Japanese: 少年の思い)	Shinsuke Gomi	Satoko Sekine	February 28, 2018	
22	9	"Soaring Sparks of Fire"; Transliteration: "Mai Agaru Hi no ko" (Japanese: 舞い上がる火の粉)	Motohiro Abe	Fūta Takei; Yukie Sugawara	March 7, 2018	
23	10	"Disturbance Begins in the Royal Capital"; Transliteration: "Ōto Dōran Joshō" (Japanese: 王都動乱序章)	Tatsuya Shiraishi	Itsuki Yokoyama	March 14, 2018	
24	11	"Jaldabaoth"; Transliteration: "Yarudabaoto" (Japanese: ヤルダバオト)	Kazuaki Terasawa	Satoko Sekine	March 21, 2018	
25	12	"The Final Battle of the Disturbance"; Transliteration: "Dōran Saishū Kessen" (Japanese: 動乱最終決戦)	Ryūta Kawahara	Yukie Sugawara	March 28, 2018	
26	13	"The Ultimate Trump Card"; Transliteration: "Saikyō Saikō no Kirifuda" (Japanese: 最強最高の切り札)	Masaki Matsumura; Tōru Takahashi; Naoyuki Itō	Yukie Sugawara	April 4, 2018	

=== Season 3 (2018) ===
No. overall	No. in season	Title	Directed by	Written by	Original release date	Ref.
27	1	"A Ruler's Melancholy"; Transliteration: "Shihaisha no Yūutsu" (Japanese: 支配者の憂鬱)	Tatsuya Shiraishi	Yukie Sugawara	July 11, 2018	
28	2	"Carne Village Once More"; Transliteration: "Karune-mura Futatabi" (Japanese: カルネ村再び)	Kazuaki Terasawa	Yukie Sugawara	July 18, 2018	
29	3	"Enri's Upheaval and Hectic Days"; Transliteration: "Enri no Gekidō Katsu Awatadashī Hibi" (Japanese: エンリの激動かつ慌ただしい日々)	Shigeki Awai	Yukie Sugawara	July 25, 2018	
30	4	"Giant of the East, Demon Snake of the West"; Transliteration: "Higashi no Kyojin, Nishi no Maja" (Japanese: 東の巨人、西の魔蛇)	Akiko Nakano	Yukie Sugawara	August 1, 2018	
31	5	"Two Leaders"; Transliteration: "Futari no Shidō-sha" (Japanese: 二人の指導者)	Masaki Matsumura	Yukie Sugawara	August 8, 2018	
32	6	"Invitation to Death"; Transliteration: "Shide~e no Sasoi" (Japanese: 死出への誘い)	Kang Tai-sik	Yukie Sugawara	August 15, 2018	
33	7	"Butterfly Entangled in a Spider's Web"; Transliteration: "Kumo ni Karame Rareru-chō" (Japanese: 蜘蛛に絡められる蝶)	Tatsuya Shiraishi	Yukie Sugawara	August 22, 2018	
34	8	"A Handful of Hope"; Transliteration: "Hitonigiri no Kibō" (Japanese: 一握りの希望)	Kazuaki Terasawa	Yukie Sugawara	August 28, 2018	
35	9	"War of Words"; Transliteration: "Zessen" (Japanese: 舌戦)	Akiko Nakano	Yukie Sugawara	September 4, 2018	
36	10	"Preparation for War"; Transliteration: "Sensō Junbi" (Japanese: 戦争準備)	Masaki Matsumura	Yukie Sugawara	September 11, 2018	
37	11	"Another Battle"; Transliteration: "Mōhitotsu no Tatakai" (Japanese: もう一つの戦い)	Ryūta Kawahara	Yukie Sugawara	September 18, 2018	
38	12	"Massacre"; Transliteration: "Dai Gyakusatsu" (Japanese: 大虐殺)	Hideki Hosokawa	Yukie Sugawara	September 25, 2018	
39	13	"PVP"	Tatsuya Shiraishi; Kazuaki Terasawa	Yukie Sugawara	October 2, 2018	

=== Season 4 (2022) ===
No. overall	No. in season	Title	Directed by	Written by	Original release date	Ref.
40	1	"Sorcerous Nation of Ainz Ooal Gown"; Transliteration: "Ainzu Ūru Goun Madō Koku" (Japanese: アインズ・ウール・ゴウン魔導国)	Kyōsuke Takada	Yukie Sugawara	July 5, 2022	TBA
41	2	"Re-Estize Kingdom"; Transliteration: "Ri Esutīze Ōkoku" (Japanese: リ・エスティーゼ王国)	Yasumi Mikamoto	Yukie Sugawara	July 12, 2022	TBA
42	3	"Baharuth Empire"; Transliteration: "Baharusu Teikoku" (Japanese: バハルス帝国)	Kyōsuke Takada	Yukie Sugawara	July 19, 2022	TBA
43	4	"The Ruler of Conspiracy"; Transliteration: "Bōryaku no Tōchisha" (Japanese: 謀略の統治者)	Masaki Matsumura	Yukie Sugawara	July 26, 2022	TBA
44	5	"In Pursuit of the Land of Dwarves"; Transliteration: "Dowāfu no Kuni o Motomete" (Japanese: ドワーフの国を求めて)	Masaki Matsumura	Yukie Sugawara	August 2, 2022	TBA
45	6	"The Impending Crisis"; Transliteration: "Semarikuru Kiki" (Japanese: 迫りくる危機)	Norikazu Ishigōoka	Yukie Sugawara	August 9, 2022	TBA
46	7	"Frost Dragon Lord"; Transliteration: "Shimo no Ryūō" (Japanese: 霜の竜王)	Kyōsuke Takada	Yukie Sugawara	August 16, 2022	TBA
47	8	"An Unexpected Move"; Transliteration: "Keisangai no Itte" (Japanese: 計算外の一手)	Yasumi Mikamoto	Yukie Sugawara	August 23, 2022	TBA
48	9	"Countdown to Extinction"; Transliteration: "Metsubō e no Hajimari" (Japanese: 滅亡への始まり)	Masaki Matsumura	Yukie Sugawara	August 30, 2022	TBA
49	10	"The Last King"; Transliteration: "Saigo no Ō" (Japanese: 最後の王)	Ryūta Kawahara	Yukie Sugawara	September 6, 2022	TBA
50	11	"Well-prepared Traps"; Transliteration: "Harimegurasaseta Wana" (Japanese: 張り巡らされた罠)	Ryūta Kawahara	Yukie Sugawara	September 13, 2022	TBA
51	12	"Invasion of the Royal Capital"; Transliteration: "Ōto Shinkō" (Japanese: 王都侵攻)	Norikazu Ishigōoka	Yukie Sugawara	September 20, 2022	TBA
52	13	"The Witch of the Falling Kingdom"; Transliteration: "Mekkoku no Majo" (Japanese: 滅国の魔女)	Kyōsuke Takada	Yukie Sugawara	September 27, 2022	TBA

== OVAs ==
No.	Title	Original release date
1	"Ple Ple Pleiades – Nazarick's Greatest Crisis"; Transliteration: "Pure Pure Pureadesu – Nazarikku Saidai no Kiki" (Japanese: ぷれぷれぷれあです – なざりっく最大の危機)	September 30, 2016
Ainz summons the Floor Guardians (except Gargantua and Victim) and Pleiades Combat Maids and shows them the item "Total Maniac-Modified", which Yuri points out has the power to destroy the world. Upon activation, Shalltear becomes a self-loathing person, Cocytus starts saying perverted things openly, Demiurge starts adding weird random words to his sentences, and Aura and Mare act more childishly. Ainz states that the item has an effect that makes them open their heart and agrees with Demiurge's explanation that this is an experiment to show how they act when affected by a mental condition. Ainz orders the Pleiades to help him to watch over the Guardians, who have been affected by the "Total Maniac-Modified". Narberal points out that it has no effects on the Pleiades Maids for some reason. When Ainz orders them to act casually, he senses that Yuri is still traumatized from last time. He also points out that Sebas was not exposed last time, and nothing happened to him. Lupusregina states that Sebas' heart may have been in chaos, but he is desperately trying to hold himself together, though the others doubt it. Ainz interviews Shalltear in his room, accompanied by CZ and (uninvited) Albedo. Shalltear and Albedo start bickering. When asked about the reason they are always fighting, Shalltear states that the main reason is about their chest size, since all men think that "big breasts are justice". Ainz denies this, and states that some people like flat chests too, and stuttered "hinnu" instead of "hinyuu" (flat-chested), though the others think that the term is cute. Then Ainz is asked the question: does he like big breasts or small breasts? To avoid any problems, Ainz ends the segment. Ainz interviews Aura, Mare and Cocytus, accompanied by Entoma. Ainz notes that Aura has not changed much. Aura states it is because she is always honest with herself. Cocytus keeps spouting perverted delusions (similar to the usual Albedo), so Ainz asks him to be silent, which makes him cry. In an attempt to cheer him, Entoma takes out a cockroach, which frightens Cocytus. Mare catches the cockroach and the siblings roast it. Entoma points out that cockroach is more delicious eaten raw and starts eating. In the midst of the chaos, Mare asks Ainz about the person he likes, shocking him. Albedo feels like she was called by Ainz, and Lupusregina jokes that it is a skill that big breasted people have, shocking Shalltear. Ainz asks them what they like the most, and Aura, Mare and Entoma all answers "Lord Ainz", but Cocytus almost says "breasts", though he corrects his answer before he spouts it out. Ainz interviews Demiurge and Sebas, accompanied by Entoma and Solution. Demiurge still adds random words to his sentences. Sebas tries to restrain himself from acting wildly. He gets the chance to do so when Demiurge says that Ainz asked them to act casually, but Solution states that the Sebas now is his true self, so he has no option but to restrain himself and act like everything is normal. Solution suddenly becomes plump, shocking Sebas (who screams), and in return shocking Ainz (whose emotion gets regulated). Ainz states that Solution took a challenge to eat 10 humans at once, causing her to get fat. Yuri, Lupusregina and Narberal arrive in the Treasure Room. She states that the "Total Maniac-Modified" is different from the one she saw last time, and claims that it was made by Pandora's Actor, because the puppet's face on the item looks exactly like Pandora's real face. Demiurge joins the talk, and reveals that the item has no effect on him, and him talking weirdly is just an act. Pandora explains that since making an item that affect personality is hard, he had a prototype that turns someone's personality to simple qualities – sexually open, self-loathing, amplifying childish tendencies, in short, changes into any character. It is revealed that Ainz actually took the prototype, since the prototype and the real item have no differences in shape prior to being used (even Pandora can not tell the differences). In Ainz's room, everything becomes chaotic. In order to cure the effect, Pandora takes out the hammer-looking item "Total Calmness", which cancels the effect of "Total Maniac-Modified". As the leader of the Guardians, Albedo takes charge – Solution and Lupusregina to confront Shalltear; Entoma and CZ to confront Cocytus; Sebas (still affected) to confront Aura and Mare; Yuri and Narberal to guard the door; Demiurge to hit the targets with "Total Calmness" (Albedo assigns herself to guard Ainz, which the latter does not want to tsukkomi). Upon being healed, the affected people forget what happened, and Demiurge lies that the destruction of Ainz's room is caused by Yuri's Flying Head Attack. For safety, Ainz hits Demiurge and Albedo with "Total Calmness" before deciding to do the same thing to himself. Afterwards, Pandora, in an attempt to get screentime, states that it is just a beginning towards more madness (denied by Ainz). Alone in his room, Ainz thinks that they can talk honestly with each other while bathing, and a mind-reading CZ points out it could be a foreshadowing.
