= List of Kingdom (Japanese TV series) episodes =

Kingdom is an anime series adapted from the manga of the same title written and illustrated by Yasuhisa Hara. The series was adapted into a two-season, seventy-seven episode anime series by studio Pierrot. The first season of thirty-eight episodes aired from June 4, 2012, to February 25, 2013. A second season was announced, and aired thirty-nine episodes from June 8, 2013, to March 1, 2014. An English language release of the anime was licensed by Funimation Entertainment. A third season aired from April 6, 2020, to October 18, 2021. On April 26, 2020, the anime production committee announced that Episode 5 and onwards of the third series would be indefinitely postponed by the COVID-19 pandemic. On October 5, 2020, it was announced that the broadcast of episode 5 onwards would resume in May 2021. At the end of the third season's final episode, a fourth season was announced, and aired from April 10 to October 2, 2022. A fifth season was announced at the end of the fourth season. It was originally planned to premiere on January 7, 2024, but the premiere had been delayed by a week due to the channel coverage of the Noto earthquake. A sixth season was announced in April 2025 and premiered on October 5 of the same year.

== Series overview ==
Season	Episodes	Originally released	
Season	Episodes	First released	Last released
1	38	June 4, 2012	February 25, 2013
2	39	June 8, 2013	March 1, 2014
3	26	April 6, 2020	October 18, 2021
4	26	April 10, 2022	October 2, 2022
5	13	January 13, 2024	March 30, 2024
6	13	October 5, 2025	December 27, 2025

== Episodes ==
=== Season 1 (2012–13) ===
No. overall	No. in season	Title	Directed by	Written by	Original release date
1	1	"The Nameless Boy"; Transliteration: "Mumei no shōnen" (Japanese: 無名の少年)	Jun Kamiya; Kiichi Takaoka	Naruhisa Arakawa	June 4, 2012
2	2	"An Encounter With Destiny"; Transliteration: "Unmei no deai" (Japanese: 運命の出会い)	Mitsutoshi Satō	Masahiko Shiraishi	June 11, 2012
3	3	"For a Friend"; Transliteration: "Tomo yo...!" (Japanese: 友よ…！)	Daisuke Tsukushi	Katsura Murayama	June 18, 2012
4	4	"The King and the Sword"; Transliteration: "Ō to ken" (Japanese: 王と剣)	Masahiro Takada	Tsuyoshi Tamai	June 25, 2012
5	5	"Unbroken Heart"; Transliteration: "Orenai kokoro" (Japanese: 折れない心)	Mitsutoshi Satō	Masaki Wachi	July 2, 2012
6	6	"The Path to Becoming a General"; Transliteration: "Taishōgun e no michi" (Japanese: 大将軍への道)	Kiichi Takaoka	Masahiko Shiraishi	July 9, 2012
7	7	"The Fearsome Folk of the Mountains"; Transliteration: "Osoroshiki yama no tami" (Japanese: 恐ろしき山の民)	Takenori Mihara	Katsura Murayama	July 16, 2012
8	8	"Everyone's Dream"; Transliteration: "Sorezore no yume" (Japanese: それぞれの夢)	Mitsutoshi Satō	Tsuyoshi Tamai	July 23, 2012
9	9	"On to Xianyang"; Transliteration: "Iza kanyō e" (Japanese: いざ咸陽へ)	Daisuke Tsukushi	Masaki Wachi	July 30, 2012
10	10	"Storming the Capital"; Transliteration: "Ōto totsunyū" (Japanese: 王都突入)	Atsushi Nakayama	Masahiko Shiraishi	August 6, 2012
11	11	"A Fierce Battle Begins"; Transliteration: "Gekisen kaishi" (Japanese: 激戦開始)	Kiichi Takaoka	Katsura Murayama	August 13, 2012
12	12	"The Ultimate Sword"; Transliteration: "Kyūkyoku no ittō" (Japanese: 究極の一刀)	Masahiro Takada	Tsuyoshi Tamai	August 20, 2012
13	13	"Lan Kai Roars"; Transliteration: "Rankai hoeru" (Japanese: ランカイ吠える)	Mitsutoshi Satō	Masaki Wachi	August 27, 2012
14	14	"The Strength of the Sword"; Transliteration: "Ken no chikara" (Japanese: 剣の力)	Daisuke Tsukushi	Masahiko Shiraishi	September 3, 2012
15	15	"The Qualities of a King"; Transliteration: "Ō no shikaku" (Japanese: 王の資格)	Kiichi Takaoka	Naruhisa Arakawa	September 10, 2012
16	16	"Lü Buwei"; Transliteration: "Ryofui" (Japanese: 呂不韋)	Masahiro Takada	Katsura Murayama	September 17, 2012
17	17	"First Campaign"; Transliteration: "Uijin" (Japanese: 初陣)	Mitsutoshi Satō	Tsuyoshi Tamai	September 24, 2012
18	18	"The Chariot Squadron's Menace"; Transliteration: "Senshatai no kyōi" (Japanese: 戦車隊の脅威)	Daisuke Tsukushi	Masaki Wachi	October 1, 2012
19	19	"Raging Battle"; Transliteration: "Rekka no tatakai" (Japanese: 烈火の戦い)	Shintarō Itoga	Masahiko Shiraishi	October 8, 2012
20	20	"Wang Yi Intrudes"; Transliteration: "Ōki ran'nyū" (Japanese: 王騎乱入)	Kiichi Takaoka	Katsura Murayama	October 15, 2012
21	21	"The Meaning of a General"; Transliteration: "Shōgun no imi" (Japanese: 将軍の意味)	Mitsutoshi Satō	Tsuyoshi Tamai	October 22, 2012
22	22	"The Brave General vs. The Skilled General"; Transliteration: "Mōshō tai chishō" (Japanese: 知将対猛将)	Masahiro Takada	Masaki Wachi	October 29, 2012
23	23	"An Evening Story"; Transliteration: "Yogatari" (Japanese: 夜語り)	Shū Watanabe	Naruhisa Arakawa	November 5, 2012
24	24	"A New Trial"; Transliteration: "Aratanaru shiren" (Japanese: 新たなる試練)	Shintarō Itoga	Masahiko Shiraishi	November 12, 2012
25	25	"Commission"; Transliteration: "Ninmei" (Japanese: 任命)	Daisuke Tsukushi	Katsura Murayama	November 19, 2012
26	26	"Pang Nuan, God of War"; Transliteration: "Bushin hōken" (Japanese: 武神 龐煖)	Kiichi Takaoka	Tsuyoshi Tamai	November 26, 2012
27	27	"The Fei Xin Force is Born"; Transliteration: "Hishintai tanjō" (Japanese: 飛信隊誕生)	Masahiro Takada	Masaki Wachi	December 3, 2012
28	28	"Wang Yi's Flying Arrow"; Transliteration: "Ōki no hiya" (Japanese: 王騎の飛矢)	Mitsutaka Noshitani	Masahiko Shiraishi	December 10, 2012
29	29	"The Tides of War Suddenly Turn"; Transliteration: "Senkyoku kyūten" (Japanese: 戦局急転)	Shigeki Kawai	Katsura Murayama	December 17, 2012
30	30	"An Act of God"; Transliteration: "Tensai" (Japanese: 天災)	Kiichi Takaoka	Naruhisa Arakawa	December 24, 2012
31	31	"The Power of Unity"; Transliteration: "Shū no chikara" (Japanese: 集の力)	Shintarō Itoga	Tsuyoshi Tamai	January 7, 2013
32	32	"The Fei Xin Force on the Run"; Transliteration: "Haisō no hishintai" (Japanese: 敗走の飛信隊)	Daisuke Tsukushi	Masaki Wachi	January 14, 2013
33	33	"Wang Yi Takes the Field"; Transliteration: "Ōki shutsujin!" (Japanese: 王騎 出陣！)	Mitsutoshi Satō	Masahiko Shiraishi	January 21, 2013
34	34	"The Main Attraction"; Transliteration: "Shin'uchi" (Japanese: 真打ち)	Mitsutaka Noshitani	Katsura Murayama	January 28, 2013
35	35	"Commanding Generals Face to Face"; Transliteration: "Sōdaishō mieru" (Japanese: 総大将 見える)	Kiichi Takaoka	Tsuyoshi Tamai	February 4, 2013
36	36	"Wang Yi and Liao"; Transliteration: "Ōki to Kyū" (Japanese: 王騎と摎)	Shintarō Itoga	Masaki Wachi	February 11, 2013
37	37	"I Stand on the Verge of Death"; Transliteration: "Ware, shisen ni ari" (Japanese: 我、死線にあり)	Mitsutoshi Satō	Masahiko Shiraishi	February 18, 2013
38	38	"Succession"; Transliteration: "Keishō" (Japanese: 継承)	Jun Kamiya; Kiichi Takaoka	Naruhisa Arakawa	February 25, 2013

=== Season 2 (2013–14) ===
No. overall	No. in season	Title	Directed by	Written by	Original release date
39	1	"New Era"; Transliteration: "Shin Jidai" (Japanese: 新時代)	Akira Iwanaga	Naruhisa Arakawa	June 8, 2013
40	2	"A Quiet Battlefield"; Transliteration: "Shizukanaru Senjō" (Japanese: 静かなる戦場)	Toshinori Fukushima	Masahiko Shiraishi	June 15, 2013
41	3	"A Tumultuous Banquet"; Transliteration: "Arashi no Shukuen" (Japanese: 嵐の祝宴)	Mitsutaka Noshitani	Masaki Wachi	June 22, 2013
42	4	"Kings and Ants"; Transliteration: "Ō to Ari" (Japanese: 王と蟻)	Mitsutoshi Satō	Tsuyoshi Tamai	June 29, 2013
43	5	"A Third Force"; Transliteration: "Dai San Seiryoku" (Japanese: 第三勢力)	Kazunobu Fuseki	Katsura Murayama	July 6, 2013
44	6	"Beautiful Venom"; Transliteration: "Utsukushiki Mōdoku" (Japanese: 美しき猛毒)	Tōru Ishida	Naruhisa Arakawa	July 13, 2013
45	7	"A Cursed Prince"; Transliteration: "Norowareta Ōji" (Japanese: 呪われた王子)	Daisuke Tsukushi	Masahiko Shiraishi	July 20, 2013
46	8	"Zheng and Zi Xia"; Transliteration: "Sei to Shika" (Japanese: 政と紫夏)	Naoki Horiuchi	Masaki Wachi	July 27, 2013
47	9	"Binding Wish"; Transliteration: "Tsunagu Negai" (Japanese: つなぐ願い)	Mitsutaka Noshitani	Tsuyoshi Tamai	August 3, 2013
48	10	"Broken Love"; Transliteration: "Kudaketa Ai" (Japanese: 砕けた愛)	Kazunobu Fuseki	Katsura Murayama	August 10, 2013
49	11	"Assemblage"; Transliteration: "Soroibumi" (Japanese: 揃い踏み)	Mitsutoshi Satō	Naruhisa Arakawa	August 17, 2013
50	12	"Siege of Gaolang Castle"; Transliteration: "Kōrō-jō Kōryaku" (Japanese: 高狼城攻略)	Norihiko Nagahama	Masahiko Shiraishi	August 24, 2013
51	13	"My Way of Fighting"; Transliteration: "Ore no Yarikata" (Japanese: 俺の戦り方)	Seimei Kidokoro	Masaki Wachi	August 31, 2013
52	14	"The Man, Lian Po"; Transliteration: "Sono Otoko, Renba" (Japanese: その男、廉頗)	Yūsuke Onoda	Tsuyoshi Tamai	September 7, 2013
53	15	"Air of a Military Commander"; Transliteration: "Bushō no Kūki" (Japanese: 武将の空気)	Hiromichi Matano	Katsura Murayama	September 14, 2013
54	16	"Midnight Great General"; Transliteration: "Mayonaka no Taishōgun" (Japanese: 真夜中の大将軍)	Daisuke Tsukushi	Masahiko Shiraishi	September 21, 2013
55	17	"The Night before the Start of War"; Transliteration: "Kaisen Zen'ya" (Japanese: 開戦前夜)	Kazunobu Fuseki	Tsuyoshi Tamai	September 28, 2013
56	18	"Clash!"; Transliteration: "Gekitotsu!" (Japanese: 激突！)	Mitsutaka Noshitani	Katsura Murayama	October 6, 2013
57	19	"Xuan Feng's Scheme"; Transliteration: "Genpō no Kisaku" (Japanese: 玄峰の奇策)	Norihiko Nagahama	Masaki Wachi	October 13, 2013
58	20	"The Feixin Unit's Counterattack"; Transliteration: "Hishintai Gyakushū" (Japanese: 飛信隊逆襲)	Kanji Abe	Masaki Wachi	October 20, 2013
59	21	"The Thief vs. The Strategist"; Transliteration: "Tōzoku Tai Gunryakuka" (Japanese: 盗賊対軍略家)	Mitsutoshi Satō	Masahiko Shiraishi	October 27, 2013
60	22	"Meng Tian's Proposal"; Transliteration: "Mōten no Teian" (Japanese: 蒙恬の提案)	Hiromichi Matano	Katsura Murayama	November 3, 2013
61	23	"United Front of Three Units"; Transliteration: "Santai Kyōtō" (Japanese: 三隊共闘)	Yūsuke Onoda	Tsuyoshi Tamai	November 10, 2013
62	24	"A Wall That Must be Overcome"; Transliteration: "Koeru beki Kabe" (Japanese: 越えるべき壁)	Kiyoshi Murayama	Masahiko Shiraishi	November 17, 2013
63	25	"Double Bluff"; Transliteration: "Ura no Ura" (Japanese: 裏の裏)	Mitsutoshi Satō	Katsura Murayama	November 24, 2013
64	26	"The Caliber of a General"; Transliteration: "Shō no Utsuwa" (Japanese: 将の器)	Mitsutaka Noshitani	Masaki Wachi	December 1, 2013
65	27	"The Hour of Conclusion"; Transliteration: "Ketchaku no Toki" (Japanese: 決着の刻)	Norihiko Nagahama	Masahiko Shiraishi	December 8, 2013
66	28	"The Final Plan"; Transliteration: "Saigo no Saku" (Japanese: 最後の策)	Norihiko Nagahama	Masaki Wachi	December 15, 2013
67	29	"A Single Moment"; Transliteration: "Isshun" (Japanese: 一瞬)	Yūsuke Onoda	Katsura Murayama	December 22, 2013
68	30	"Precious Comrades"; Transliteration: "Daiji na Nakama" (Japanese: 大事な仲間)	Mitsutoshi Satō	Tsuyoshi Tamai	December 29, 2013
69	31	"Meng Ao, Standing Firm"; Transliteration: "Mōgō, hikazu" (Japanese: 蒙驁、退かず)	Kiyoshi Murayama	Masahiko Shiraishi	January 5, 2014
70	32	"Unfading Era"; Transliteration: "Iroasenu Jidai" (Japanese: 色あせぬ時代)	Yoshinori Odaka	Masaki Wachi	January 12, 2014
71	33	"Victory... And..."; Transliteration: "Shōri… Soshite" (Japanese: 勝利…そして)	Hiroaki Nishimura	Naruhisa Arakawa	January 19, 2014
72	34	"The Strategist Arrives"; Transliteration: "Gunshi no Tōchaku" (Japanese: 軍師の到着)	Mitsutaka Noshitani	Tsuyoshi Tamai	January 26, 2014
73	35	"Trial and Resolve"; Transliteration: "Shiren to Kakugo" (Japanese: 試練と覚悟)	Norihiko Nagahama	Naruhisa Arakawa	February 2, 2014
74	36	"Outwit"; Transliteration: "Ue o Iku" (Japanese: 上を行く)	Tōru Ishida	Naruhisa Arakawa	February 9, 2014
75	37	"Distant Thunder"; Transliteration: "Enrai" (Japanese: 遠雷)	Yoshinori Odaka	Masaki Wachi	February 16, 2014
76	38	"Stage of Strategy"; Transliteration: "Bōryaku no Butai" (Japanese: 謀略の舞台)	Mitsutoshi Satō	Katsura Murayama	February 23, 2014
77	39	"A New Legend"; Transliteration: "Aratanaru Densetsu" (Japanese: 新たなる伝説)	Toshinori Fukushima	Masahiko Shiraishi	March 1, 2014

=== Season 3 (2020–21) ===
No. overall	No. in season	Title	Directed by	Written by	Original release date
78	1	"The Encroaching Coalition Army"; Transliteration: "Semari Kuru Gasshō-gun" (Japanese: 迫り来る合従軍)	Kazuya Monma	Noboru Takagi	April 6, 2020
79	2	"A Coming Together"; Transliteration: "Ichidō ni Kaisu" (Japanese: 一堂に会す)	Kiyomitsu Satō	Jun'ichi Miyashita	April 13, 2020
80	3	"The Battle of Hangu Pass"; Transliteration: "Kankoku-kan Kōbō-sen" (Japanese: 函谷関攻防戦)	Taiji Kawanishi	Shingo Irie	April 20, 2020
81	4	"Two Battlefields"; Transliteration: "Futatsu no Senjō" (Japanese: 二つの戦場)	Yasuhiro Geshi	Suzuyuki Kaneko	April 27, 2020
82	5	"Rise of a Young General"; Transliteration: "Wakaki Shō no Taitō" (Japanese: 若き将の台頭)	Masahiro Takada	Daishirō Tanimura	May 3, 2021
83	6	"A Mutual Self-Confidence"; Transliteration: "Tagai no Jifu" (Japanese: 互いの自負)	Ryūta Yamamoto	Noboru Takagi	May 10, 2021
84	7	"A Wasteland Riddled with Holes"; Transliteration: "Ana-darake no Kōya" (Japanese: 穴だらけの荒野)	Taiji Kawanishi	Jun'ichi Miyashita	May 17, 2021
85	8	"Wa Lin: A Spirited Woman"; Transliteration: "Joketsu Ka Rin" (Japanese: 女傑・媧燐)	Kiyomitsu Satō	Shingo Irie	May 24, 2021
86	9	"Meng Wu's Proclamation"; Transliteration: "Mō Bu no Geki" (Japanese: 蒙武の檄)	Taiji Kawanishi	Daishirō Tanimura	May 31, 2021
87	10	"A Promotion in a Predicament"; Transliteration: "Kyūchi no Dai Batteki" (Japanese: 窮地の大抜擢)	Yasuhiro Geshi	Suzuyuki Kaneko	June 7, 2021
88	11	"A General's Pride"; Transliteration: "Bushō no Kyōji" (Japanese: 武将の矜持)	Harume Kosaka	Jun'ichi Miyashita	June 14, 2021
89	12	"The Wa Lin Army's Charge"; Transliteration: "Ka Rin-gun no Totsugeki" (Japanese: 媧燐軍の突撃)	Masahiro Takada	Shingo Irie	June 21, 2021
90	13	"The Strongest"; Transliteration: "Shikyō" (Japanese: 至強)	Takaaki Wada	Daishirō Tanimura	June 28, 2021
91	14	"The Mightiest Man"; Transliteration: "Saikyō no Otoko" (Japanese: 最強の漢)	Kazuya Monma	Aya Yoshinaga	July 19, 2021
92	15	"Beyond Hangu Pass"; Transliteration: "Kankoku-kan no Ura" (Japanese: 函谷関の裏)	Taiji Kawanishi	Jun'ichi Miyashita	July 26, 2021
93	16	"Li Mu's Whereabouts"; Transliteration: "Ri Boku no Yukue" (Japanese: 李牧の行方)	Yasuhiro Geshi	Suzuyuki Kaneko	August 2, 2021
94	17	"The Ultimate Instinctive Type"; Transliteration: "Honnō-gata no Kiwami" (Japanese: 本能型の極み)	Kiyomitsu Satō	Shingo Irie	August 16, 2021 (Note: This episode was originally scheduled to air on August 9, 2021, but has been postponed by a week due to typhoon news coverage on NHK General TV.)
95	18	"Zheng's Decision"; Transliteration: "Sei no Ketsudan" (Japanese: 政の決断)	Harume Kosaka	Daishirō Tanimura	August 23, 2021
96	19	"Zheng Speaks"; Transliteration: "Sei, Katarikakeru" (Japanese: 政、語りかける)	Taiji Kawanishi	Aya Yoshinaga	August 30, 2021
97	20	"The First Night"; Transliteration: "Saisho no Yoru" (Japanese: 最初の夜)	Takaaki Wada	Jun'ichi Miyashita	September 6, 2021
98	21	"A Secret Revealed"; Transliteration: "Himitsu no Roken" (Japanese: 秘密の露見)	Ayaka Tsujihashi	Noboru Takagi	September 13, 2021
99	22	"With All We Have"; Transliteration: "Dashi Tsukusu" (Japanese: 出し尽くす)	Masayuki Iimura	Suzuyuki Kaneko	September 20, 2021
100	23	"Unprecedented Aid"; Transliteration: "Hakaku no Kasei" (Japanese: 破格の加勢)	Taiji Kawanishi	Shingo Irie	September 27, 2021
101	24	"Deepest Gratitude"; Transliteration: "Shinsha" (Japanese: 深謝)	Yasuhiro Geshi	Daishirō Tanimura	October 4, 2021
102	25	"The Difference Between Dances"; Transliteration: "Mibu no Chigai" (Japanese: 巫舞の違い)	Kazuya Monma	Noboru Takagi	October 11, 2021
103	26	"Another Path"; Transliteration: "Betsu no Michi" (Japanese: 別の道)	Kiyomitsu Satō	Noboru Takagi	October 18, 2021

=== Season 4 (2022) ===
No. overall	No. in season	Title	Directed by	Written by	Storyboarded by	Original release date (Note: The fourth season premiered on NHK General TV on April 9 at 24:00 (effectively April 10 at 12:00 a.m.).)
104	1	"Seven Nations, After the War"; Transliteration: "Sengo no Shichi Koku" (Japanese: 戦後の七国)	Taiji Kawanishi	Junichi Miyashita	Yoshihiro Takamoto	April 10, 2022
105	2	"Ominous Shadow"; Transliteration: "Fuon na Kage" (Japanese: 不穏な影)	Natsumi Yasue	Shingo Irie	Toshinori Watanabe	April 17, 2022
106	3	"The Punitive Force Moves Out"; Transliteration: "Tōbatsu-gun Shutsujin" (Japanese: 討伐軍出陣)	Yasuhiro Geshi	Daishiro Tanimura	Toshinori Narita	April 24, 2022
107	4	"Assault on Tunliu"; Transliteration: "Tonryū Kōjō-sen" (Japanese: 屯留攻城戦)	Harume Kosaka	Suzuyuki Kaneko	Kenichi Imaizumi	May 1, 2022
108	5	"Sword and Shield"; Transliteration: "Ken to Tate" (Japanese: 剣と盾)	Taiji Kawanishi	Aya Yoshinaga	Kenichi Imaizumi	May 8, 2022
109	6	"A New Strategic Base"; Transliteration: "Aratana Yōsho" (Japanese: 新たな要所)	Kiyomitsu Satou	Aya Yoshinaga	Yoshihiro Takamoto	May 15, 2022
110	7	"The Call"; Transliteration: "Yobikake" (Japanese: 呼びかけ)	Kiyomitsu Satou	Noboru Takagi	Toshinori Narita	May 22, 2022
111	8	"Ten's Existence"; Transliteration: "Ten no Sonzai" (Japanese: 貂の存在)	Masayuki Iimura	Shingo Irie	Naoki Kotani	May 29, 2022
112	9	"Zi Bai's Name"; Transliteration: "Murasaki Haku no Na" (Japanese: 紫伯の名)	Kazuya Monma	Daishirou Tanimura	Kenichi Imaizumi	June 5, 2022
113	10	"The Eyes of the Middle Kingdom"; Transliteration: "Chūka no Chūmoku" (Japanese: 中華の注目)	Ippei Ichii	Suzuyuki Kaneko	Yoshihiro Takamoto; Kenichi Imaizumi	June 12, 2022
114	11	"Training Days"; Transliteration: "Shūren no Hibi" (Japanese: 修練の日々)	Taiji Kawanishi	Noboru Takagi	Toshinori Narita	June 19, 2022
115	12	"Age of Giants"; Transliteration: "Ketsubutsutachi no Sedai" (Japanese: 傑物達の世代)	Harume Kosaka	Shingo Irie	Yoshihiro Takamoto	June 26, 2022
116	13	"Movement in Xianyang"; Transliteration: "Kan'yō no Ugoki" (Japanese: 咸陽の動き)	Kiyomitsu Satou	Daishirou Tanimura	Kenichi Imaizumi	July 3, 2022
117	14	"A New Nation"; Transliteration: "Atarashī Kuni" (Japanese: 新しい国)	Natsumi Yasue	Junichi Miyashita	Toshinori Narita	July 10, 2022
118	15	"The Man Who Was Nothing"; Transliteration: "Nanimonai Otoko" (Japanese: 何もない男)	Kiyomitsu Satou	Aya Yoshinaga	Kenichi Imaizumi	July 17, 2022
119	16	"The Crowning Ceremony"; Transliteration: "Kaka no Gi" (Japanese: 加冠の儀)	Kazuya Monma	Suzuyuki Kaneko	Kenichi Imaizumi	July 24, 2022
120	17	"Three Sides, Unyielding"; Transliteration: "Sankata Yuzurazu" (Japanese: 三方ゆずらず)	Taiji Kawanishi	Noboru Takagi	Toshinori Narita	July 31, 2022
121	18	"River-Crossing Battle"; Transliteration: "Toka no Tatakai" (Japanese: 渡河の戦い)	Harume Kosaka	Shingo Irie	Kenichi Imaizumi	August 7, 2022
122	19	"A Parting of Ways"; Transliteration: "Tamoto wo Wakatsu" (Japanese: 袂を分かつ)	Kiyomitsu Satou	Daishirou Tanimura	Kenichi Imaizumi	August 14, 2022
123	20	"A Dream Nation"; Transliteration: "Yume no Yōna Kuni" (Japanese: 夢のような国)	Taiji Kawanishi	Junichi Miyashita	Kenichi Imaizumi	August 21, 2022
124	21	"Our Only Shot at Victory"; Transliteration: "Yuiitsu no Shōki" (Japanese: 唯一の勝機)	Natsumi Yasue	Aya Yoshinaga	Kenichi Imaizumi	August 28, 2022
125	22	"Running For Your Lives"; Transliteration: "Inochigake no Tōhi" (Japanese: 命がけの逃避)	Kiyomitsu Satou	Suzuyuki Kaneko	Kenichi Imaizumi	September 4, 2022
126	23	"Reversal Rush"; Transliteration: "Gyakuten no Mōshin" (Japanese: 逆転の猛進)	Taiji Kawanishi	Shingo Irie	Ippei Ichii	September 11, 2022
127	24	"The Rebellion's Conclusion"; Transliteration: "Nairan no Shūchakuten" (Japanese: 内乱の終着点)	Kazuya Monma	Noboru Takagi	Kazuya Monma	September 25, 2022
128	25	"A Time for Venturing Forth"; Transliteration: "Yūhi no Toki" (Japanese: 雄飛の刻)	Ippei Ichii	Noboru Takagi	Ippei Ichii; Kenichi Imaizumi	September 25, 2022
129	26	"The Six Great Generals' Whereabouts"; Transliteration: "Rikushō no Yukue" (Japanese: 六将の行方)	Ippei Ichii	Noboru Takagi	Kenichi Imaizumi	October 2, 2022

=== Season 5 (2024) ===
No. overall	No. in season	Title	Directed by	Written by	Storyboarded by	Original release date
130	1	"Take the Field"; Transliteration: "Bakemono-tachi no Shutsujin" (Japanese: 化物達の出陣)	Taiji Kawanishi	Noboru Takagi	Kenichi Imaizumi	January 14, 2024
131	2	"The Stench of the Battlefield"; Transliteration: "Senjō no Nioi" (Japanese: 戦場の匂い)	Kazuya Monma	Noboru Takagi	Kenichi Imaizumi	January 21, 2024
132	3	"Heiyong at Night"; Transliteration: "Kuro Hitsuji no Yoru" (Japanese: 黒羊の夜)	Kiyomitsu Satou	Aya Yoshinaga	Kenichi Imaizumi	January 28, 2024
133	4	"A Lieutenant's Responsibility"; Transliteration: "Fukuchō no Sekinin" (Japanese: 副長の責任)	Reiko Nozaki	Junichi Miyashita	Kenichi Imaizumi	February 4, 2024
134	5	"A Determined Crossing"; Transliteration: "Shūnen no Toka" (Japanese: 執念の渡河)	Kazuya Monma	Daishirou Tanimura	Kenichi Imaizumi	February 11, 2024
135	6	"Heiyong's Crucial Moment"; Transliteration: "Kokuyō no Ooichiban" (Japanese: 黒羊の大一番)	Ippei Ichii	Aya Yoshinaga	Kenichi Imaizumi	February 18, 2024
136	7	"The Tragedy of Liyan"; Transliteration: "Rigan no Higeki" (Japanese: ライガンの悲劇)	Taiji Kawanishi	Junichi Miyashita	Kenichi Imaizumi	February 25, 2024
137	8	"In an Instant"; Transliteration: "Isshun de" (Japanese: 一瞬で)	Kazuya Monma	Noboru Takagi	Kenichi Imaizumi	March 3, 2024
138	9	"Misfortune"; Transliteration: "Fukō" (Japanese: 不幸)	Kiyomitsu Satou	Daishirou Tanimura	Kenichi Imaizumi	March 10, 2024
139	10	"Roar of Pride"; Transliteration: "Hokori no Hōkō" (Japanese: 誇りの咆哮)	Reiko Nozaki	Aya Yoshinaga	Kenichi Imaizumi	March 17, 2024
140	11	"Wei Ping and the Fei Xin Force"; Transliteration: "Gi Hira to Hishin-gun" (Japanese: 魏平と飛信軍)	Kazuya Monma	Junichi Miyashita	Kenichi Imaizumi	March 24, 2024
141	12	"The Small Hours Before a Showdown"; Transliteration: "Kessen mae no Sūjikan" (Japanese: 決戦前の数時間)	Ippei Ichii	Noboru Takagi	Kenichi Imaizumi	March 31, 2024
142	13	"Cai Ze's Honor"; Transliteration: "Sai Taku no Kyōji" (Japanese: 蔡沢の矜持)	Taiji Kawanishi	Noboru Takagi	Kenichi Imaizumi	March 31, 2024

=== Season 6 (2025) ===
No. overall	No. in season	Title	Directed by	Written by	Storyboarded by	Original release date
143	1	"Qin's Stumbling Block"; Transliteration: "Hata no Shōheki" (Japanese: 秦の障壁)	Kazuya Monma	Noboru Kimura	Kenichi Imaizumi	October 5, 2025
144	2	"The Rising Tumult"; Transliteration: "Ichidō ni Kaisu" (Japanese: 激動の起こり)	Kiyomitsu Satō	Aya Yoshinaga	Kenichi Imaizumi	October 12, 2025
145	3	"The Qin Army Lineup"; Transliteration: "Hata-gun no Fujin" (Japanese: 秦軍の陣容)	Taiji Kawanishi	Suzuyuki Kaneko	Kenichi Imaizumi	October 19, 2025
146	4	"Zhao's National Gate"; Transliteration: "Chō no Kokumon" (Japanese: 趙の国門)	Ippei Ichii	Shingo Irie	Kenichi Imaizumi	October 26, 2025
147	5	"Storming Retsubi"; Transliteration: "Retsu o Kōjōsen" (Japanese: 列尾攻城戦)	Yasuyuki Shinozaki	Junichi Miyashita	Kenichi Imaizumi	November 2, 2025
148	6	"Liewei's Trap"; Transliteration: "Retsubi no Wana" (Japanese: 列尾の罠)	Yasuhiro Geshi	Shingo Irie	Yasuhiro Geshi	November 9, 2025
149	7	"Weapons of Conquest"; Transliteration: "Kanraku no Buki" (Japanese: 陥落の武器)	Hiromasa Irieda	Noboru Takagi	Kenichi Imaizumi	November 16, 2025
150	8	"The Battle Begins"; Transliteration: "Hibuta wo Kiru" (Japanese: 火蓋を切る)	Kazuya Monma	Aya Yoshinaga	Kenichi Imaizumi	November 23, 2025
151	9	"The Weight of Resolve"; Transliteration: "Kakugo no Hijū" (Japanese: 覚悟の比重)	Kiyomitsu Satō	Daishirō Tanimura	Kenichi Imaizumi	November 30, 2025
152	10	"Descendants of the Quanrong"; Transliteration: "Kenjū no shison" (Japanese: 犬戎の子孫)	Taiji Kawanishi	Junichi Miyashita	Kenichi Imaizumi	December 7, 2025
153	11	"The One-Hit-Kill Detached Force"; Transliteration: "Ichigekihikkoro no dokuritsu butai" (Japanese: 一撃必殺の独立部隊)	Ippei Ichii	Suzuyuki Kaneko	Kenichi Imaizumi	December 14, 2025
154	12	"Insufficient Rank"; Transliteration: "Ranku fusoku" (Japanese: ランク不足)	Yasuyuki Shinozaki	Shingo Irie	Kenichi Imaizumi	December 21, 2025
155	13	"A Great General's View"; Transliteration: "Idaina shōgun no shiten" (Japanese: 偉大な将軍の視点)	Kazuya Monma; Kiyomitsu Satō	Noboru Takagi	Kenichi Imaizumi	December 28, 2025
