= List of Xam'd: Lost Memories episodes =

Xam'd: Lost Memories is an anime series adapted from a concept created by the animation studio Bones. Directed by Masayuki Miyaji, the series follows Akiyuki Takehara, a high school student, who becomes involved in a terrorist attack and is given the power to transform into a creature known as a Xam'd, along with his interactions with Haru Nishimura, Akiyuki's friend who attempts to rendezvous with him, and Nakiami, a mysterious girl who helps Akiyuki to control the Xam'd power inside of him.

The anime series was first announced to be exclusively released on the PlayStation Network on July 17, 2008, at the E3 video game trade show, and lasted twenty-six episodes. The episodes began to be released weekly in America on July 18, 2008, in English subtitles. The first twelve episodes later began to be released in Japan starting on September 24, 2008, with two episodes becoming available each week.

On June 24, 2010, Sentai Filmworks announced that it had sub-licensed the series for home video distribution across North America, and the first half season was released on DVD and Blu-ray Disc on September 21, 2010. The second set was released on November 9, 2010, on DVD and Blu-ray. The English dub is available for streaming on the Anime Network as of September 16, 2010.

== Episode list ==
No.	Title	Original release date	North American release date
1	"Xam'd at the Dawn of War"; Transliteration: "Zamudo Kagerō ni Arawaru" (Japanese: ザムド 陽炎に現る)	September 24, 2008	September 2, 2010
Akiyuki Takehara rushes to go to school, stopping by his father's clinic to deliver a lunchbox. Haru Nishimura and Furuichi Teraoka wait for Akiyuki at the school bus before departure. He cleverly allows an unknown Ruikon girl, later recognized as Nazuna, on the bus, not knowing who she is. More and more inquiry airships start to hover over Sentan Island. The peaceful life on this island is disrupted when sudden war breaks out. Nazuna detonates herself in the bus, destroying the school grounds. A glowing substance is emitted from Nazuna before she dies, and it enters into Akiyuki's arm and takes control of his body, as he transforms into a strange creature known as Xam'd.
2	"Blackout on Sentan Island"; Transliteration: "Sentan-tō Shikō Teishi" (Japanese: 尖端島 思考停止)	September 24, 2008	September 9, 2010
An enemy invasion takes place and wreaks havoc on the island. Akiyuki confronts one of the humanforms, luring it into the riverbank. Also, Akiyuki saves Haru from falling off a water pipe, holding her as he destroys the humanform. Afterwards, a mysterious girl named Nakiami reverts him to his normal self on the condition that he promise to come with her, lest he turn to stone. Aboard the postal airship Zanbani, Nakiami takes care of Akuyuki in her quarters. Meanwhile, following the aftermath of the enemy invasion, Akiyuki's friends and parents are distraught upon his sudden disappearance.
3	"The Way to Freedom"; Transliteration: "Gisō Kokusai Yūbinsen" (Japanese: 偽装 国際郵便船)	October 1, 2008	September 16, 2010
After Nakiami performs a special treatment to contain the power of Xam'd in Akiyuki's right arm, Akiyuki is now compelled to work as a new member of the postal crew, much to his chagrin. Akiyuki begs Ishu Benikawa to return him back to the island, but she turns down the request. Another humanform later approaches Zanbani and captures Akiyuki. Nakiami sets out to rescue Akiyuki from being absorbed by the humanform. Akiyuki thanks Nakiami for saving him yet again. Haru visits Fusa Takehara to tell her that Akiyuki has not died, promising to find him as soon as she can.
4	"Enlightenment"; Transliteration: "Kono Yo ni Hibiku Miminari no Kazukazu" (Japanese: この世に響く 耳鳴りの数々)	October 1, 2008	September 23, 2010
Akiyuki gradually becomes accustomed to his new environment on the Zanbani. He visits Madam Tenshin in the basement of the postal airship, who questions him about what Xam'd is seeking. After that, he begins the distinctive training with the crew members in order to control his powers. Nakiami spots another airship nearby and it just so happens that she is well acquainted with its crew members, but Ishu forbids Nakiami from making contact with them. Haru and Furuichi watch as their classmate Sagara mourns for her deceased loved ones, surrendering herself to despair. Akiyuki, visiting Madam Tenshin again, explains that Xam'd wants to coexist with others in peace. Ryuzo Takehara is summoned by Prois Sukakki to assist her in an anti-humanform research laboratory.
5	"Shattered Bonds"; Transliteration: "Chōtei suru Mono Shinai Mono" (Japanese: 調停する者 しない者)	October 8, 2008	September 30, 2010
Nakiami talks to her acquaintances from the refugee airship, but the rest of her crew wonders if she will leave the ship to join them. At the research laboratory, Reiko Kanba shows Tojiro Kagisu a Hiruko endosymbiont experiment being done on Sagara, but Kagisu storms out in disgust. Ishu reveals to Akiyuki that Nakiami used to cry all the time when she was first aboard the airship. Ishu is told by Zeygand that Nakiami is destined to return to her homeland some day. Haru and Furuichi find Sagara in the streets, but she suddenly changes into a humanform and runs amok, leading Kagisu to detain and kill her himself as a result.
6	"Live Fire"; Transliteration: "Haru to Kyokutō Jichiku" (Japanese: ハルと極東自治区)	October 8, 2008	October 7, 2010
Akiyuki tags along with Nakiami to scout out a humanform partially turned to stone. However, as Nakiami tries to take out the Hiruko of the humanform, she becomes caught in the stone, urging Akiyuki to save her using his controlled powers. Furuichi, as well as Haru, decides to join the East Autonomy military, undergoing some testing. Haru finally hears news from Akiyuki via letter. Ryuzo explains to Fusa that he was formerly a military doctor serving the Northern Government. As Haru and Furuichi have just started their military training, a rogue Xam'd breaks out of the research laboratory and reaches the surface.
7	"Guardians of Stone"; Transliteration: "Kitsuritsu Seou wa Inochi ka Nekomata ka" (Japanese: 屹立 背負うは命か猫股か)	October 15, 2008	October 14, 2010
Haru, Furuichi, and their squadron are assigned to engage the rogue Xam'd in battle, but Haru realizes that it is pregnant before the squadron has it constrained. Akiyuki receives Haru's stack of letters and learns that she will be waiting for him at Tsumebara Pass on the island. Nakiami allows him to go there, under the condition of bringing along a pet nekomata, not knowing it has a tracking device on its collar. Kagisu orders Haru and Furuichi to go Tsumebara Pass with their group to locate a squadron that has gone missing. In the mountains, Akiyuki, after encountering a man who turns into a humanform, is saved by Kio and Zuizo. They tell him that more and more people have been turning into humanforms since the air raid a month ago. Worried about Akiyuki, Nakiami leaves the airship to go look for him in the mountains.
8	"Showdown at Tsumebara Pass"; Transliteration: "Tsumebara Tōge no Hitogata-gari" (Japanese: 詰腹峠のヒトガタ狩り)	October 15, 2008	October 21, 2010
Akiyuki leaves the nekomata with Kio and Zuizo while he continues on towards Tsumebara Pass. Inside a tunnel, Haru and Furuichi spot one of the suits from the missing squadron, but its mainsoul pilot has turned into a humanform. Akiyuki meets up with Haru on a bridge outside the tunnel, but their reunion is cut short when he exposes his right arm in combat against the humanform. An angry Furuichi confronts him after discovering that he became a Xam'd, but an unknown Xam'd intervenes and allows Akiyuki to run away. Nakiami later finds an exhausted Akiyuki at the harbor, and later says her farewell to Kio and Zuizo for their help. Furuichi reports to Kagisu that Akiyuki is a Xam'd. Nakiami brings Akiyuki safely back onto the airship as the crew prepares to take off.
9	"The Astonishing Raigyo"; Transliteration: "Mizu mo Shitataru Tsunomata Raigyo" (Japanese: 水もしたたる角股雷魚)	October 22, 2008	October 28, 2010
Raigyo Tsunomata, the Xam'd that appeared at the bridge, returns to the Zanbani after two years of absence. All members of the crew seem to be happy to meet him again, as he gives them all gifts to their liking. A green soulstone is received from the tunnel and will be used for future Hiruko endosymbiont experiments in the research laboratory. Akiyuki gradually becomes irritated because he feels he is being bossed around by Raigyo and ignored by the others. Haru tries to convince Kagisu that Akiyuki is still a human being as Xam'd. Raigyo discusses with Nakiami that her village plans to retake the Holy Land from the Northern Government.
10	"Moving On"; Transliteration: "Kako Omoi Kiru" (Japanese: 過去 重い斬る)	October 22, 2008	November 4, 2010
Five years ago, Ahm had found Nakiami attempting to prevent Raigyo from dying when he first turned into Xam'd. Raigyo asks for the crew to take a picture together by sunset. During a target practice session, Furuichi shows excellence in accuracy, while Haru seems to be troubled. Before the picture is taken, Nakiami blames herself for being a bother to Ishu. Kagisu tells Haru to let go of the past and focus on her military career. Akiyuki is shocked to see the Hiruko in his arm shining in the photographs. Two years ago, when Haru's mother died after a car accident, Akiyuki came to comfort her to ease her suffering. As a humanform heads toward the Zanbani, Raigyo puts Akiyuki to the test to prove his skill in combat.
11	"Assault: The Zanbani"; Transliteration: "Shūgeki Zanbani-gō" (Japanese: 襲撃 ザンバニ号)	October 29, 2008	November 11, 2010
Nakiami helps Akiyuki neutralize a humanform attacking the postal ship, but a raid of humanforms follows. Ahm leaves Akushiba to pilot the ship while he goes to the top deck to operate a fire cannon to shoot at one of the humanforms. Akiyuki and Raigyo fend off the humanforms on the top deck, but other humanforms infiltrate the ship, and Kiselji tries to maintain the ship's altitude from the engine room. Ahm is consequently shot by a humanform when he jumps in and assists Ishu. Ahm tells Akishiba to check for Ishu while Yunbo learns how to fly the airship. Nakiami is devastated that she could not prevent Ishu from killing a humanform after it began to turn to stone.
12	"Flowers blooming into the Dark"; Transliteration: "Kurayami de Saku Hana" (Japanese: 暗闇で咲く花)	October 29, 2008	November 18, 2010
The airship lands on a coast so its crew members can recuperate. Meanwhile, Ryuzo voices his concerns to Kagisu about the anti-humanform research project. Due to the incident that happened on the airship earlier, Nakiami decides to return to her homeland, but Akiyuki wants to go with her for his reasons as well. Ishu says she never considered Nakiami to have ever been a bother to her. The crew members see Nakiami and Akiyuki off as they take leave. Elsewhere, Haru pays a visit to Furuichi, and she eventually finds out that he has become a Xam'd as well, much to her sympathy.
13	"Running Barefoot"; Transliteration: "Tada Hadashi de Hashiru Shikanai" (Japanese: タダ 裸足デ走ルシカナイ)	November 5, 2008	November 25, 2010
When Akiyuki arrives with Nakiami to Sentan Island, he contacts Haru's sister Midori Nishimura to notify Haru about his return. However, in doing so, he alerts Kagisu and Sukkaki to his presence as well. Akiyuki visits Ryuzo at the clinic, and, after exposing his Hiruko, he is surprised to find out that his father has been keeping Nazuna in hospitalization. Fusa, aware that her son came by, is unable to catch up to him after he left the apartment. Meanwhile, Haru meets Nakiami at Keiko Plaza. Akiyuki later reunites with Haru there, but this is interrupted when Furuichi comes with the eager intent of using his newly found power as he takes hold of Haru's arm.
14	"Cerulean Skies"; Transliteration: "Ao Sugiru Sora" (Japanese: 蒼スギル空)	November 12, 2008	December 2, 2010
Furuichi soon goes berserk, and he starts attacking Akiyuki and Haru after knocking Nakiami out of the way. After much aggression, Akiyuki transforms into Xam'd and punches Furuichi repeatedly into expansion. Nakiami steps in and destroys the Hiruko, saving Haru from being absorbed and reverting Furuichi to a normal state. Kagisu intervenes and arrests Haru and Furuichi, while Akiyuki gives cover for Nakiami to escape by holding Kagisu hostage. Atop a water tower, Kagisu tries to reason with Akiyuki, but the latter slips away and leaves him behind. After being shot by a military officer, Akiyuki falls off a cliff down into the river. Although Furuichi tries to escape from his arrest, he crushes his own head after other military officers spot him nearby. When Akiyuki regains his senses, he finds himself captured by a slave trader inside a train, apparently suffering from amnesia with his Xam'd mask permanently affixed to his face.
15	"Souls at Peace"; Transliteration: "Mama Nemureru Tamashii" (Japanese: まま 眠れる魂)	November 19, 2008	December 9, 2010
Kagisu and Sukkaki send Haru into solitary confinement. Nakiami, needing oil fuel for her beat kayak, has to stay at an inn for ten days until the next fuel truck stops by in town. She meets a young orphan boy named Yango, after witnessing his thievery at a food market, and she soon realizes that he has a Hiruko in his arm and is a Xam'd. Yango is later ambushed by three thugs, but Nakiami convinces them to leave by handing her beat kayak over to them. As Nakiami heads off the next morning, Yango decides to tag along with her, and they both travel towards Tessik Village.
16	"Burning in Our Wake"; Transliteration: "Tojō no Kisetsu ga Moe Ochiru" (Japanese: 途上の季節が炎え墜ちる)	November 26, 2008	December 16, 2010
Nakiami and Yango cross the mountains, but due to their Tessik heritage, they are not allowed to board ferry across the river toward the village. Instead, they are lucky enough to hitch on a cargo ship heading in the same direction. Meanwhile, Kagisu brings in an enslaved Ruikon boy named Azami who will later be used for interrogation. Meanwhile, Midori is undergoing military training and is producing fast results. A worried Nakiami loses track of Yango when she goes to evaluate the snowy pathway. After she finally finds him, she is overjoyed when he takes her to view a town he found nearby. Azami contacts Haru to warn her that Midori is in grave danger. A mysterious creature, later known as the Hiruken, persuades a kind old woman to buy Akiyuki from the slave traders.
17	"Lambs to the Altar"; Transliteration: "Kohitsuji to Oborozuki" (Japanese: 子羊とオボロ月)	December 3, 2008	December 23, 2010
The old woman, named Sumako, is enjoying her new life now with Akiyuki and the Hiruken. Nakiami and Yango stay in a cave until a snowstorm lets up. Kagisa threatens Kanba for his life if he does not continue to perform experiments on Azami. Akiyuki, with the Hiruken, goes with Sumako to deliver several letters to local residents, but it seems that the mail is filled with grievances and bad tidings. Fusa is upset to find out that Ryuzo has been harboring Nazuna in his care. After Haru is molested by Kagisa, Sukkaki purposely leaves the keys inside the prison cell as a ruse for Haru to escape. Nakiami and Yango finally arrive at their home village, just to be welcomed by the new chief, the former's younger sister Kujireika.
18	"What Can You See From There"; Transliteration: "Soko kara Nani ga Mieru ka" (Japanese: そこから何が見えるか)	December 10, 2008	December 30, 2010
Nakiami is welcomed by all the villagers at Tessik Village. After fleeing from the military, Haru visits Ryuzo, and, after seeing Nazuna communicating with her, she embarks on a journey to find Akiyuki by herself. Ishu and Raigyu plan to meet Zeygand at a base to trade for weapons. The Sentan Island commandant talks with Ryuzo concerning his situation with Nazuna. Meanwhile, Nakiami, much to her dismay, learns that Kujireika implant a Hiruko into herself to become Xam'd and that she dubiously plans to wage war against the Northern Government Army.
19	"Sudden Outbreak: Romance Flowers Bloom"; Transliteration: "Gūhatsu Romansu Kaika" (Japanese: 偶発 ロマンス開花)	December 17, 2008	January 6, 2011
Nakiami utterly rejects supporting Kujireika in her cause, but when Kujireika grabs Nakiami with her Xam'd arm, Yango stands firm with his Xam'd arm against her to prevent her from harming Nakiami. After purchasing a beat kayak from a peddler, Haru must travel through a canyon and avoid the humanforms along the way. Akiyuki, after climbing up a water tower, is urged by the Hiruken to remember his own name. As Akiyuki chooses to jump off, Haru manages to save him just in time and helps him to remember his name and recover his memory. Akiyuki says farewell to Sumako and departs with Haru to locate the Quickening Chamber.
20	"Watered with Tears"; Transliteration: "Namida Saku Chiruauto" (Japanese: 涙咲く 散る会うと)	December 24, 2008	January 13, 2011
Nazuna tells Ryuzo that Midori will be used in a Hiruko endosymbiont experiment, using the green soulstone as a catalyst. Nakiami and Yango leave the village only to see it attacked by a fleet of Northern Government army airships. Nakiami feels she needs to return to her village to help her people, but Yango grabs her arm in order to prevent her from going back. He expresses his fear that she will be killed and he will once again be alone in the world. Kujireika, in the main sanctuary, devours a black soulstone to transform into an all powerful Xam'd, and she wipes out all the soldiers unassisted. Meanwhile, Akiyuki and Haru search for the entrance to the Quickening Chamber. Haru gives Akiyuki an antidote formulated by his father and after describing to him what Azami had told her, they are approached by a man wearing a cloak named Shiroza.
21	"Sanctuary Breached"; Transliteration: "Kinryōku Sennyū "Naitara Make da" Fusa wa Zutto Sō Omotteita" (Japanese: 禁猟区潜入 「泣いたら負けだ」 フサはずっとそう思っていた)	December 31, 2008	January 20, 2011
Kanba needs more time to complete his experiment, so Kagisu promises to release Azami from prison to relieve Kanba of his worries. However, when Kagisu goes to see Azami, the latter reminds the former of a memory of losing his mother. The Sentan Island commandant takes Ryuzo, along with Jinichiro Nishimura, Haru and Midori's father, to the research laboratory so that they can rescue Midori. Ryuzo is surprised to see that Azami has been murdered, while Jinichiro is saddened to find his daughter missing. Akiyuki and Haru venture further with Shiroza into the Quickening Chamber, while Ishu and Raigyo plan their attack on the Diamond Tower. Ryuzo, reuniting with an overwhelmed Fusa at the drawbridge, kisses her after expressing his desire to make her smile again.
22	"Tojiro and Ryuzo"; Transliteration: "Tōjirō to Ryūzō" (Japanese: 凍二郎とリュウゾウ)	January 7, 2009	January 27, 2011
Ishu and Raigyo must cross the Torotoge Gate and continue their assault on the Diamond Tower. Jinichiro and the Sentan Island commandant are arrested when they threaten to kill Sukkaki. Ryuzo finds Kagisu at the war memorial monument, where Kagisu feels grateful to Ryuzo for saving his life many years ago. However, their meeting turns into an aggressive confrontation after Ryuzo requests that Kagisu return Midori back to her father. Akiyuki and Haru learn from Shiroza that the Ruikon cult will sacrifice themselves to the chosen Xam'd in the Quickening Chamber, which makes the pair distraught. Nakiami and Yango run into Zeygand, who has his airship docked and his crew aboard. Ryuzo hesitates to shoot Kagisu when he puts his own gun to his head, but he subdues him in a physical fight. However, Kagisu suddenly flings Ryuzo into the monument and then strikes his left eye with his sword. After Kagisu prepares to walk away, Ryuzo is finally able to release the bullet on him. As Kagisu was losing consciousness, he reminisces about his mother, who is revealed to be Sumako.
23	"Hiruken Emperor Born"; Transliteration: "Tanjō Hiruken Kōtei" (Japanese: 誕生 ヒルケン皇帝)	January 14, 2009	February 3, 2011
As the Tessik airship sets course to the Quickening Chamber, Nakiami contacts Akushiba to check up on the crew of the Zanbani. Meanwhile, Ishu and Raigyo are in the process of making their final push into the chamber inside the top of the Diamond Tower. When Southern airships begin to raid the Quickening Chamber, Shiroza annihilates the surrounding area from inside the Diamond Tower, firing multiple laser beams using lost Ruikon souls as its energy source. Akiyuki urges Haru to fly the beat kayak to leave the scene. Raigyo is shot and wounded inside the tower, and a grenade causes the ceiling to collapse. However, he uses his Xam'd arm to keep Ishu from being crushed, but, after Ishu kisses him, the ceiling squashes him as she make it safely across. Nakiami and Yango leave the Tessik airship to stop the battle over the chamber. After Ishu detonates the chamber at the top of the tower, the Hiruken Emperor held inside is awakened.
24	"Voices From Beyond"; Transliteration: "Naki Tamashii no Kaikō" (Japanese: 亡き魂の邂逅)	January 21, 2009	February 10, 2011
The Hiruken Emperor turns the sky into total darkness from the top of the Diamond Tower. Haru encounters Midori transformed into a humanform, and she tries to reason with her sister, only to end up being devoured by her. Akiyuki is distressed by this but activates only his mask and arm and gradually begins to turn into stone. Nakiami arrives to the scene and confronts Midori, trying to get her to fight the Hiruko inside of her. After also being consumed, Nakiami commands Midori to leave behind her sadness in order to save herself from the Hiruko. Nakiami appears in Midori's memory of her mother's death, where she extracts the mother's Hiruko for Midori to swallow. While reliving her final memory of being with her mother prior to the car accident, Midori fulfills her wish of being able to tell her mother about her role in a school play. Akiyuki, being reminded by Nakiami of what he seeks, breaks free of the stone and transforms completely. He then destroys the humanform, saving all three girls in the end. Akiyuki's next objective is to face the Hiruken Emperor head on in the sky.
25	"Nakiami and Sannova"; Transliteration: "Nakiami to Sannōba" (Japanese: ナキアミとサンノオバ)	January 28, 2009	February 17, 2011
Nakiami must make up with Lady Sannova for having abandoned her teachings long ago. Haru and Midori must leave Akiyuki to fight his battle on his own. Yango, finding Shiroza inside the Quickening Chamber, will soon see the ritual of the chamber, much to his objection. The Hiruken Emperor causes the clouds to rain, which turns those in the ruins to stone upon contact. Kujireika deliberately transforms into her Xam'd form to attack the Hiruken Emperor. Lady Sannova takes Nakiami to a meadow in an alternate realm, where she reveals that she was the one responsible for creating the Hiruken Emperor in the past. Nakiami wants to live with the souls of the earth, whether or not if they are purified, and this thereby completes her training with Lady Sannova, who has now merged into the Mother Hiruko. Although Akiyuki tries to prevent Kujireika from attacking the Hiruken Emperor, she is consequently wounded from her efforts, but he manages to save her from plummeting into the ground. Nakiami, after briefly reuniting with Yango, seals herself inside the Quickening Chamber. Akiyuki goes inside the Hiruken, defeating it by giving it his own name.
26	"The Great Rock and the Girl"; Transliteration: "Ōkina Ishi to Shōjo" (Japanese: 大きな石と少女)	February 4, 2009	February 24, 2011
Akiyuki, now nameless, has his face covered by the Xam'd mask once again. Nakiami has completed the ritual, returning the sky to its brightness and reviving those who were encased in stone. Refusing to accept Nakiami's fate, Yango attempts to keep the chamber from closing. Akiyuki, who falls from the sky and lands besides Yango, partially transforms into Xam'd and uses all his strength to try and keep the chamber door from closing, but to no avail. His exertion subsequently turns him into stone. The crew of the Zanbani drop letters over the area in hopes of bringing smiles to the people. Nine years later on Sentan Island, all of its inhabitants are peacefully continuing on with their lives. Akiyuki reawakens, as he reunites with the one he loves.
