= List of Penguin Musume Heart episodes =

This article is a list of episodes for the ONA series, Penguin Musume Heart (ペンギン娘♥はぁと, Pengin Musume ♥ Haato). The majority of episode titles are parodies of miscellaneous anime, manga and other media.

No.	Title	Original release date
1	"Penguin, INVADE"; Transliteration: "Pengin, shuurai" (Japanese: ペンギン, 襲来)	April 19, 2008
Penguin enters Kujira's school and instantly becomes attracted to her due to her likeness to Takenoko, an anime character Penguin watches. Penguin decides to compete against Kujira for school council president, forcing her to wear Takenoko cosplay if she loses. They stay neck and neck through the competition, but a heavy cosplay choice by Penguin in a swimming pool battle causes Kujira to forfeit in order to stop her from drowning. Penguin decides to give the final vote to Kujira, but accidentally votes for herself.
2	"Cha's Counterattack!"; Transliteration: "Gyakushuu no shā!" (Japanese: 逆襲のシャー!)	April 26, 2008
As Kujira has trouble with her father thinking she's a boy, Cha Chi returns from China issuing a challenge to her. Eight years ago, when Kujira was under the assumption she was a boy, she made a promise with Cha Chi that if she could defeat her in a duel, she would become her husband. Cha Chi however refuses to listen to Kujira's revelation that she is in fact a girl and continues to fight. Kujira eventually defeats her, but not giving up, Chi decides to enrol in the school. She soon becomes unnerved about the presence of Penguin, and when Kujira deflects a kick from Cha Chi, she feels betrayed and runs off. The title is a parody of Mobile Suit Gundam: Char's Counterattack.
3	"My sister is a 3rd grader" Transliteration: "Imouto ha shougaku san nensei" (Japanese: 妹は小学三年生)	May 3, 2008
Penguin's sister Kaede brings over some special made Daifuku to the student council. Unfortunately, it turns everyone except Kujira, who didn't eat one, into catgirls, who proceed to 'attack' the other students. This is due to a drug that Sebastian, the family butler, put in due to Penguin's request. Kaede uses her connections to capture all the cat-students, return them to normal, and send Penguin to the lecture room. The title is a parody of My Wife is a High School Girl.
4	"Walking around under the Night Sky"; Transliteration: "Meguriai yozora (sora) no shita" (Japanese: めぐりあい夜空(そら)の下)	May 10, 2008
Kujira and Nene attend a fireworks festival, but Kaede can't appear to find Penguin. Despite the help of Sebastian, she can't seem to find her. They eventually find Penguin on a balcony on a tree, which turned out to be her plan to find the best spot to watch the fireworks, pleasing Kaede a lot.
5	"Mary-sama Watches Over Us"; Transliteration: "Marī-sama ga miteru" (Japanese: マリー様が見てる)	May 17, 2008
Mary W. Whitebear issues a challenge to Penguin, and gets her servant Maguro to deliver it to Kujira. However, due to a misunderstanding by Cha Chi, the letter gets destroyed and the message unintelligible. So while Mary waits for ages for Penguin to arrive on a sunny island for her challenge, suffering a sunburn in the process, Penguin takes Kujira, Nene and Cha Chi to her holiday mansion—in the South Pole. Frustrated by the incredible coldness, Kujira decides to break up the furniture to start a fire to get some warmth. However, since the mansion is made of ice, is collapses. The title refers to Maria-sama ga Miteru.
6	"Chi is my Master"; Transliteration: "Kore ga wata chī no go shujin sama" (Japanese: これがワタチーの御主人様)	May 24, 2008
Cha Chi is annoyed at the threat of Penguin interfering with her marrying Kujira, and makes several assassination attempts, all foiled by Sebastian. She encounters someone delivering flyers to find workers for Penguin's Maid Café. Misunderstanding the term 'maid' with 'meido', the Japanese word for hell, she assumes this is a technique for sending Penguin to hell. She joins, only to feel embarrassed when Penguin brings Kujira and Nene to the café, and has the whole 'maid' thing explained to her. Frustrated, Cha Chi destroys her maid's outfit, infuriating Penguin into a vicious frenzy against her. The title is a parody of He Is My Master.
7	"The All-loving Shrine Maiden"; Transliteration: "Minna zuki no miko" (Japanese: みんな好きの巫女)	May 31, 2008
Whilst cleaning up the classroom, Kujira and Penguin make mistakes that should infuriate Nene, but she behaves nicely and feels more concern for her friend's safety. She explains that because of the way her grandma taught her, she never gets mad and always smiles. Excited that Nene is revealed to be a shrine maiden, naturally appealing to her otaku side, Penguin offers to help Nene out at the shrine, but makes even more mistakes. Even after unleashing several demons upon the city, Nene still is unable to get mad at Penguin and keeps smiling, despite Kujira's objections. The title is a reference to Kannazuki no Miko.
8	""Targeted School""; Transliteration: "Neraware chatta gakuen" (Japanese: ねらわれちゃった学園)	June 7, 2008
Penguin and friends finally noticed the large presence made by Mary Chupacabra W. Whitebear, who has built a giant building next to the Nankyoku building. Despite the threatening atmosphere, Penguin decides to bring soba over to her building. Mary violently rejects this offer and throws it back at Penguin's face, enraging Kujira. The next day, the gang discover a huge school overtowering their own, and learn that the Whitebear companied had bought out the school and transferred all the students. On their way to the roof of the new school to face Mary, they encounter one of her four knights, Hunting Maria. The title is a reference to a famous science fiction novel by Taku Mayumura.
9	"Violent Game of Fours"; Transliteration: "Shibou yuugi" (Japanese: 四暴遊戯)	June 14, 2008
On encountering Hunting Maria, Kujira decides to fight her. When Maria cuts her cheek, Cha Chi gets furious and defeats her for damaging her fiancée. As they move on, they end up on a quiz show set, hosted by the next of the Four Knights, Kiyomi Kodami. She asks a bunch of questions that only Penguin is allowed to answer, and since she can't read kanji she can't even cheat. When she answers questions wrong, she gets weights dropped on her head, causing it to bleed. However, this activates her cosplay powers, since blood over her face is a cosplay of Taishi Shotoko, conveniently the answer to the last question. As they progress, they are trapped in a cage by the next of the Four Knights, Kare Ijuin. The title is a reference to the Bruce Lee film Game of Death.
10	"Battle to the Death, White Knights!"; Transliteration: "Shitou, howaito naitsu!" (Japanese: 死闘, ホワイトナイツ!)	June 21, 2008
Kare Ijuin challenges the girls to a skirt flipping competition in order to escape from the cage, and with a foul swoop instantly knocks out Penguin, Kujira and Cha Chi. However, Nene manages to keep her skirt down despite Kare's efforts, and manages to see the truth behind the beautiful lies, which is that Kare is actually a man. They next move on to face Maguro, who challenges Kujira to an arm wrestling match. Whilst struggling earlier on, due to distracting texts from Maguro, she makes a comeback and the two remain in deadlock for hours until Maguro reaches her limit and faints. Kujira catches her and declares it a draw, much to Cha Chi's dismay. They finally reach Mary, who is punishing the other knights for their failure. Penguin declares the final challenge.
11	"Legendary Giant Labu Invokes!"; Transliteration: "Densetsu kyojin rabu, hatsudou hen" (Japanese: 伝説巨人ラブ、発動編)	June 28, 2008
For the final battle between Penguin and Mary, Kujira suggests a sumo match, thinking that Penguin's 'assets' will give her the advantage. However, this advantage is soon lost and the battle becomes tough. Both teams receive love from their respective friends to grow to an enormous size, and the match ends with the city demolished and Penguin the victor. The title is a reference to Space Runaway Ideon.
11.5	"Penguin Musume Heart MAD"	July 19, 2008
A clip show of sorts in which the cast try to make a MAD Movie, a type of video remixing popular on the Japanese website, Nico Nico Douga, which results in several different stories made from recycled clips.
12	"Tale of Poor Sisters"; Transliteration: "Binbō shimai-tachi monogatari" (Japanese: 貧乏姉妹達物語)	September 6, 2008
Following the supersized battle, Mary has become bankrupt from paying the damages, and is envious of how Penguin manages to easily afford rebuilding the entire city. To cheer her up, the four knights hold a small party for her birthday. However, they are unaware that they are being watched. The title is a reference to Binbō Shimai Monogatari.
13	"The Princess of Badminton"; Transliteration: "Badominton no oujo-sama" (Japanese: バドミントンの王女様)	September 13, 2008
In an attempt to get Mary to join the student council as a club activity, Penguin challenges her to a game of badminton, throwing in a rule that points are painted on the opponent's face with ink. Mary dominates her, but soon realises that Penguin is actually aroused by all the brushing. The title is a parody of The Prince of Tennis.
14	"The Legend of the Burning Galaxy"; Transliteration: "Ginga moe-moe densetsu" (Japanese: 銀河萌萌伝説)	September 20, 2008
Penguin falls for silent otaku Saki Hojiro, who turns out to be Maguro's little sister. Despite the rough impulses forced upon by Penguin, Saki appears to be happy. The title is a reference to Legend of the Galactic Heroes.
15	"Back to the 6 Years Ago"; Transliteration: "Bakku tu za roku nen mae" (Japanese: バック·トゥ·ザ·6年前)	September 27, 2008
Realizing that she once confessed to Penguin whilst thinking she herself was a boy, Kujira uses Penguin's time machine to travel back to six years ago to prevent it from happening. However, after accidentally revealing herself to save Penguin, Kujira finds herself the object of her younger self's affection. The title is a parody of Back to the Future.
16	"The Girl who Leapt through Time"; Transliteration: "Toki o kakechatta shōjo" (Japanese: 時をかけちゃった少女)	October 4, 2008
Kujira returns to the future only to find that Penguin is in poverty after losing to Mary. Deciding to correct this, she goes back in time to help her younger self rescue Penguin again. With time fixed, Kujira returns to the future again only to find out she's marrying Penguin. The title is a reference to the manga and film of the same name.
17	"The Familiar of Rose"; Transliteration: "Roze no tsukaima" (Japanese: 薔薇 (ロゼ) の使い魔)	October 11, 2008
Mary is kidnapped by Aka and Riff of Kurobara Communications and leave a letting calling Penguin to rescue her. Kujira is concerned about it being a trap and recommends they make a plan, but Penguin insists on going after her, much to Kujira's dislike. Penguin, Cha Chi and Nene, later joined by the White Knights, show up at the hostage point where Aka and Riff await. Riff sends the White Knights, and herself, down a chasm whilst the others prepare to face Aka. The title is a parody of Zero no Tsukaima.
18	"A Lovely Incident"; Transliteration: "Karei naru ichigeki" (Japanese: 鰈(かれい)なる一撃)	October 18, 2008
The White Knights are trapped in a chasm with Riff, who releases a hallucinogenic gas that causes the girls to fight each other. Kare however is unaffected, since he is actually a man, but she is knocked out by Maguro. Meanwhile Penguin and Cha Chi face off against Aka, and fare badly. Kujira laments that there are some opponents you can't win against, and then spots Kaede. Kaede offers to go help Penguin, though Kujira decides she doesn't want to go. Just then, a scream is heard.
19	"Dance, Maiden"; Transliteration: "Mae, otome" (Japanese: 舞え、乙女)	October 25, 2008
Whilst Kaede tries to talk Kujira out of her funk, Cha Chi faces against Aki in what seems to be a losing battle. However, Nene helps her out and the two work together to take Aki down using Cha's ultimate technique. Aki is defeated, but everyone is injured and exhausted. Penguin is given keycards from Cha and Kare, and she vows to stop Kurobara Communications and rescue Mary, whilst Kujira finally gets the courage to go help her. The title is a parody of My Otome.
20	"Sakura in Trouble!?"; Transliteration: "Sakura taihen!?" (Japanese: さくら大変!?)	November 1, 2008
Penguin enters Kurobara HQ to find Black Rose, who has an obsessive amount of memorabilia of her. Nene and Cha Chi try a second assault, but are defeated easily. Black Rose then raises herself and Penguin atop a tall thorny tower, which the others are unable to climb. Kujira then arrives, and Penguin prepares to face off against Black Rose. The title is a parody of Sakura Wars.
21	"Sakura and Kujira! Together we are Magi Pure"; Transliteration: "Sakura to kujira, futari wa maji pyua" (Japanese: さくらと鯨, ふたりはマジピュア)	November 8, 2008
Penguin attempts to fight Black Rose using an 'Etorofu cosplay' (a headband with eyebrows drawn on it), but fails. Meanwhile Kujira climbs the thorny tower, declining just going up via helicopter. Just as Penguin is being bombarded by Black Rose's whip, Kujira comes to the rescue. Combining their strengths, they place a direct punch on Black Rose, only to find her behind them in a dark aura. The title is a parody of Futari wa Pretty Cure.
22	"From the Center of the Earth, Cry Out Your Love! Escape!"; Transliteration: "Sekai no chuushin de ai wo sakende, dasshutsu" (Japanese: 世界の中心で愛を叫んで, 脱出)	November 15, 2008
Black Rose reveals herself to be Penguin's mother, who was just testing her to see how much she had matured over the past 5 years (which wasn't an awful lot, it seems.) This annoys Mary who feels like she was just dragged into it. Life returns to normal, and Aka and Riff are transferred into Penguin's class after being sacked from their jobs at Kurobara, and Penguin naturally makes a bad first impression. However, behind the scenes, Black Rose is preparing an imitation Sakura.

== See also ==
- Penguin Musume
