= List of Ace of Diamond episodes =

Ace of Diamond is an anime series based on the manga by Yuji Terajima serialized in Weekly Shōnen Magazine. The TV series was produced by Madhouse and Production I.G and began airing on October 6, 2013, on TX Network stations and later on AT-X. The episodes were simulcast in the US, Canada, UK, Ireland, Australia, New Zealand, South Africa, Denmark, Finland, Iceland, the Netherlands, Norway, Sweden, Central and South America, Spain, Brazil, and Portugal by Crunchyroll with English and German subtitles. The series was initially planned to be 52 episodes but was extended and ended in March 2015.

A second season started airing soon after on April 6, 2015, on TX Network stations and later on AT-X. Like its predecessor the episodes were simulcast in the aforementioned countries by Crunchyroll with English and German subtitles.

An anime adaptation of Ace of Diamond Act II has been announced, and it premiered on April 2, 2019. The cast and staff will reprise their roles from the previous series, with Madhouse returning for animation production. The series is listed for 52 episodes. On May 18th, 2024, Crunchyroll announced that Ace of Diamond Act II would receive a sequel for a fourth season. The fourth season premiered on April 5, 2026.

== Series overview ==
Season	Episodes	Originally aired	
Season	Episodes	First aired	Last aired
1	75	October 6, 2013	March 29, 2015
2	51	April 6, 2015	March 28, 2016
3	52	April 2, 2019	March 31, 2020
4	TBD	April 5, 2026	TBD

== Episodes ==
=== Season 1 (2013–2015) ===
No.	Title	Directed by	Written by	Original air date
1	"The One Pitch"; Transliteration: "Unmei no Ikkyū" (Japanese: 運命の一球)	Hironori Aoyagi	Kenji Konuta	October 6, 2013
2	"Partner"; Transliteration: "Aibō" (Japanese: 相棒)	Tatsuya Shiraishi	Kenji Konuta	October 13, 2013
3	"Not Qualified to Be a Pitcher?"; Transliteration: "Tōshu Shikkaku?" (Japanese: 投手失格？)	Mitsutaka Noshitani	Junichi Fujisaku	October 20, 2013
4	"Are You Like Me?"; Transliteration: "Onaji Taipu?" (Japanese: 同じタイプ？)	Shinichi Shimizu	Daishirō Tanimura	October 27, 2013
5	"A Clash"; Transliteration: "Gekitotsu" (Japanese: 激突)	Akira Kusune	Takahiro Udagawa	November 3, 2013
6	"Head to Head!"; Transliteration: "Makkō Shōbu" (Japanese: 真っ向勝負！)	Yukio Nishimoto	Takahiro Udagawa	November 10, 2013
7	"The Two Batteries"; Transliteration: "Futatsu no Batterī" (Japanese: ふたつのバッテリー)	Jun Nakagawa	Daishirō Tanimura	November 17, 2013
8	"The Truth About Chris"; Transliteration: "Kurisu no Shinjitsu" (Japanese: クリスの真実)	Itsuro Kawasaki	Kenji Konuta	November 24, 2013
9	"With Chagrin in His Heart"; Transliteration: "Kuyashisa, Mune ni Kizande" (Japanese: 悔しさ、胸に刻んで)	Shū Watanabe	Junichi Fujisaku	December 1, 2013
10	"Hone Your Moving Fastball"; Transliteration: "Migake, Kusedama" (Japanese: 磨け、クセ球)	Takeyuki Sadohara	Junichi Fujisaku	December 8, 2013
11	"Chris to the Field!"; Transliteration: "Kurisu Shutsujin!" (Japanese: クリス出陣！)	Shinichi Shimizu	Kenji Konuta	December 15, 2013
12	"Target"; Transliteration: "Tāgetto" (Japanese: ターゲット)	Mitsutaka Noshitani	Takahiro Udagawa	December 22, 2013
13	"You're in the First-String"; Transliteration: "Ichigun Shōkaku" (Japanese: 一軍昇格)	Tomoya Tanaka	Daishirō Tanimura	December 29, 2013
14	"Training Camp Begins!"; Transliteration: "Gasshuku Sutāto!" (Japanese: 合宿スタート！)	Yoshihisa Matsumoto	Daishirō Tanimura	January 12, 2014
15	"Lead With Your Plays!"; Transliteration: "Purē de Hippare!" (Japanese: プレーで引っぱれ！)	Yoriyasu Kogawa	Kenji Konuta	January 19, 2014
16	"Challenge"; Transliteration: "Shiren" (Japanese: 試練)	Mitsuko Ōya	Takahiro Udagawa	January 26, 2014
17	"Games Are Fun"; Transliteration: "Shiai wa Tanoshii" (Japanese: 試合は楽しい)	Tatsuya Shiraishi	Junichi Fujisaku	February 2, 2014
18	"I Hate It, But..."; Transliteration: "Mukatsuku kedo" (Japanese: ムカつくけど)	Akira Shimizu	Junichi Fujisaku	February 9, 2014
19	"Fate"; Transliteration: "Innen" (Japanese: 因縁)	Itsuro Kawasaki	Daishirō Tanimura	February 16, 2014
20	"Emergency"; Transliteration: "Kinkyū Jitai" (Japanese: 緊急事態)	Shigeru Yamazaki	Takahiro Udagawa	February 23, 2014
21	"To the Dream Stage"; Transliteration: "Yume no Butai e" (Japanese: 夢の舞台へ)	Takeyuki Sadohara	Kenji Konuta	March 2, 2014
22	"Calling for Attention"; Transliteration: "Apīru Taimu" (Japanese: アピールタイム)	Tomoya Tanaka	Takahiro Udagawa	March 9, 2014
23	"First Official Appearance"; Transliteration: "Kōshikisen Debyū" (Japanese: 公式戦デビュー)	Makoto Fuchigami	Daishirō Tanimura	March 16, 2014
24	"Clockwork"; Transliteration: "Seimitsu Kikai" (Japanese: 精密機械)	Yoshihisa Matsumoto	Junichi Fujisaku	March 23, 2014
25	"Anti-Furuya Strategy"; Transliteration: "Furuya Kōryaku" (Japanese: 降谷攻略)	Mitsuko Ōya	Kenji Konuta	March 30, 2014
26	"Miracle Akikawa"; Transliteration: "Mirakuru Akikawa" (Japanese: ミラクル明川)	Mitsutaka Noshitani	Takahiro Udagawa	April 6, 2014
27	"I'm Not Running"; Transliteration: "Nigenē zo" (Japanese: 逃げねえぞ)	Jun Nakagawa	Junichi Fujisaku	April 13, 2014
28	"Path, Eijun Sawamura to the Scorching Mound"; Transliteration: "Kiseki Sawamura Eijun Nettō no Maundo e" (Japanese: 軌跡 沢村栄純 熱闘のマウンドへ)	Jun Nakagawa	Kenji Konuta	April 20, 2014
29	"Neck and Neck"; Transliteration: "Kikkō" (Japanese: 拮抗)	Shū Watanabe	Daishirō Tanimura	April 27, 2014
30	"Winner and Loser"; Transliteration: "Shōsha to Haisha" (Japanese: 勝者と敗者)	Mitsutaka Noshitani	Daishirō Tanimura	May 4, 2014
31	"Dark Horse"; Transliteration: "Dāku Hōsu" (Japanese: ダークホース)	Makoto Fuchigami	Takahiro Udagawa	May 11, 2014
32	"Summers"; Transliteration: "Sorezore no Natsu" (Japanese: それぞれの夏)	Tomoya Tanaka	Kenji Konuta	May 18, 2014
33	"Money Tree"; Transliteration: "Kane no Naru Ki" (Japanese: 金のなる木)	Jun Nakagawa	Junichi Fujisaku	May 25, 2014
34	"Reliable Teammates"; Transliteration: "Tayoreru Senpai-tachi" (Japanese: 頼れる先輩達)	Mitsutaka Noshitani	Junichi Fujisaku	June 1, 2014
35	"Potential"; Transliteration: "Potential" (Japanese: ポテンシャル)	Akira Mano	Takahiro Udagawa	June 8, 2014
36	"The Ace Walks On"; Transliteration: "Ace Toujou" (Japanese: エース登場)	Makoto Fuchigami	Kenji Konuta	June 15, 2014
37	"Burst!"; Transliteration: "Burst!" (Japanese: バースト！)	Mitsuko Ōya	Daishirō Tanimura	June 29, 2014
38	"Roles"; Transliteration: "Sorezore no Yakuwari" (Japanese: それぞれの役割)	Jun Nakagawa	Daishirō Tanimura	July 6, 2014
39	"Expectations of an Ace"; Transliteration: "Kitai o Seotte" (Japanese: 期待を背負って)	Shū Watanabe	Takahiro Udagawa	July 13, 2014
40	"The Winning Shot"; Transliteration: "Winning Shot" (Japanese: ウィニングショット)	Tomoya Tanaka	Kenji Konuta	July 20, 2014
41	"It's the Semifinal"; Transliteration: "Iza, Junkesshou" (Japanese: いざ、準決勝)	Tatsuya Shiraishi	Junichi Fujisaku	July 27, 2014
42	"The Giant Looks Down"; Transliteration: "Sobieru Dai Kyojin" (Japanese: そびえる大巨人)	Yoshito Hata	Daishirō Tanimura	August 3, 2014
43	"Revenge"; Transliteration: "Revenge" (Japanese: リベンジ)	Makoto Fuchigami	Takahiro Udagawa	August 10, 2014
44	"Best Pitch"; Transliteration: "Kimedama" (Japanese: 決め球)	Mihiro Yamaguchi	Junichi Fujisaku	August 17, 2014
45	"Pitching of Despair"; Transliteration: "Zetsubou o Yobu Toukyuu" (Japanese: 絶望を呼ぶ投球)	Akira Mano	Kenji Konuta	August 24, 2014
46	"Fantasy"; Transliteration: "Yume Monogatari" (Japanese: 夢物語)	Mitsuko Ōya	Takahiro Udagawa	August 31, 2014
47	"That Summer"; Transliteration: "... Ano Natsu" (Japanese: ...あの夏)	Jun Nakagawa	Junichi Fujisaku	September 7, 2014
48	"At the Dorm..."; Transliteration: "Ryou nite..." (Japanese: 寮にて....)	Mitsutaka Noshitani	Junichi Fujisaku	September 14, 2014
49	"A Nostalgic Face"; Transliteration: "Natsukashii Kao" (Japanese: 懐かしい顔)	Tomoya Tanaka	Kenji Konuta	September 21, 2014
50	"Footsteps to Tomorrow"; Transliteration: "Asu e no Ashiato" (Japanese: 明日への足跡)	Tatsuya Shiraishi	Daishirō Tanimura	September 28, 2014
51	"The Battle Begins!"; Transliteration: "Kessen Kaishi" (Japanese: 決戦開始!)	Shū Watanabe	Kenji Konuta	October 5, 2014
52	"I Don't Want to Lose"; Transliteration: "Maketakunai" (Japanese: 負けたくない)	Makoto Fuchigami	Takahiro Udagawa	October 12, 2014
53	"Change Gears"; Transliteration: "Gia Chenji" (Japanese: ギアチェンジ)	Kiyoshi Murayama	Junichi Fujisaku	October 19, 2014
54	"Entrusted Faith and the Courage to Perform"; Transliteration: "Takusu Shinrai, Kotaeru Yuuki" (Japanese: 託す信頼、応える勇気)	Jun Nakagawa	Takahiro Udagawa	October 26, 2014
55	"Strong Men"; Transliteration: "Tsuyoi Otoko" (Japanese: 強い男)	Mitsuko Ōya	Junichi Fujisaku	November 2, 2014
56	"Decision"; Transliteration: "Ketsudan" (Japanese: 決断)	Akira Mano	Kenji Konuta	November 9, 2014
57	"Reliable Underclassmen"; Transliteration: "Tanomoshii Kouhai-tachi" (Japanese: 頼もしい後輩達)	Tomoya Tanaka	Takahiro Udagawa	November 23, 2014
58	"The Three-Hole"; Transliteration: "Mae o Utsu Otoko" (Japanese: 前を打つ男)	Tatsuya Shiraishi	Junichi Fujisaku	November 30, 2014
59	"Fearless"; Transliteration: "Kowai Mono Shirazu" (Japanese: 怖いもの知らず)	Kiyoshi Murayama	Kenji Konuta	December 7, 2014
60	"Lonely Sun"; Transliteration: "Kodokuna Taiyō" (Japanese: 孤独な太陽)	Shū Watanabe	Takahiro Udagawa	December 14, 2014
61	"Determined"; Transliteration: "Shūnen" (Japanese: 執念)	Tomoko Hiramuki	Junichi Fujisaku	December 21, 2014
62	"Victory or Defeat"; Transliteration: "Tennōzan" (Japanese: 天王山)	Akira Mano	Kenji Konuta	December 28, 2014
63	"Lingering Feelings"; Transliteration: "Zankyō" (Japanese: 残響)	Mitsuko Ōya	Kenji Konuta	December 28, 2014
64	"Restart"; Transliteration: "Risutāto" (Japanese: リスタート)	Tomoya Tanaka	Junichi Fujisaku	January 11, 2015
65	"In The Sun"; Transliteration: "Hi no Ataru Basho" (Japanese: 日の当たる場所)	Jun Nakagawa	Takahiro Udagawa	January 18, 2015
66	"Outsider"; Transliteration: "Yosomono" (Japanese: よそ者)	Mitsutaka Noshitani	Kenji Konuta	January 25, 2015
67	"The Kick"; Transliteration: "Happun Zairyou" (Japanese: 発奮材料)	Tatsuya Shiraishi	Junichi Fujisaku	February 1, 2015
68	"The Ace Title"; Transliteration: "Ace no Za" (Japanese: エースの座)	Makoto Fuchigami	Takahiro Udagawa	February 8, 2015
69	"Can't Lose!"; Transliteration: "Makerannee!" (Japanese: 負けらんねぇ!)	Tomoya Tanaka	Kenji Konuta	February 15, 2015
70	"Next Stage"	Shū Watanabe	Junichi Fujisaku	February 22, 2015
71	"September Sky"; Transliteration: "9-gatsu no Sora no Shita" (Japanese: ９月の空の下)	Tomoko Hiramuki	Takahiro Udagawa	March 1, 2015
72	"The Final Lesson"; Transliteration: "Saigo no Oshie" (Japanese: 最後の教え)	Mitsutaka Noshitani	Kenji Konuta	March 8, 2015
73	"Inheritance"; Transliteration: "Keishō" (Japanese: 継承)	Jun Nakagawa	Takahiro Udagawa	March 15, 2015
74	"Guiding Light"; Transliteration: "Michishirube" (Japanese: 道しるべ)	Mitsuko Ōya	Junichi Fujisaku	March 22, 2015
75	"In Pursuit"; Transliteration: "Sono Basho o Mezashite" (Japanese: その場所を目指して―)	Tatsuya Shiraishi	Kenji Konuta	March 29, 2015

=== Season 2 (2015–2016) ===
No. overall	No. in season	Title	Original air date
76	1	"Howling In The Summer"; Transliteration: "Manatsu no Houkou" (Japanese: 真夏の咆哮)	April 6, 2015
77	2	"The Summer Heat Haze"; Transliteration: "Manatsu no Kagerou" (Japanese: 真夏の陽炎)	April 13, 2015
78	3	"The Kings of Summer"; Transliteration: "Manatsu no Ouja" (Japanese: 真夏の王者)	April 20, 2015
79	4	"The Fall Tournament Begins!"; Transliteration: "Iza, Aki Tai!" (Japanese: いざ, 秋大!)	April 27, 2015
80	5	"The Cold Rain"; Transliteration: "Tsumetai Ame" (Japanese: 冷たい雨)	May 4, 2015
81	6	"Out of Order"; Transliteration: "OUT OF ORDER" (Japanese: Out of Order)	May 11, 2015
82	7	"Where I Am"; Transliteration: "Genzaichi" (Japanese: 現在地)	May 18, 2015
83	8	"Scenario"; Transliteration: "Sujigaki" (Japanese: 筋書き)	May 25, 2015
84	9	"My Path"; Transliteration: "Wagamichi" (Japanese: 我が道)	June 1, 2015
85	10	"Did You Just Pitch..."; Transliteration: "Nagetayona" (Japanese: 投げたよな)	June 8, 2015
86	11	"The Underdog Story"; Transliteration: "Gekokujou" (Japanese: 下克上)	June 15, 2015
87	12	"Self-Destruction"; Transliteration: "Jikai" (Japanese: 自壊)	June 22, 2015
88	13	"Fissure"; Transliteration: "Kiretsu" (Japanese: 亀裂)	June 29, 2015
89	14	"On My Shoulders"; Transliteration: "Seou Mono" (Japanese: 背負うモノ)	July 6, 2015
90	15	"Persistent and Diligent"; Transliteration: "Nebari Tsuyoku Tantan to" (Japanese: 粘り強く淡々と)	July 13, 2015
91	16	"Chain Reaction"; Transliteration: "Rensa Hannou" (Japanese: 連鎖反応)	July 20, 2015
92	17	"Shut Him Down!!"; Transliteration: "Nejifuseru" (Japanese: ねじ伏せろ!!)	July 27, 2015
93	18	"This Guy's Pretty Good"; Transliteration: "Yaruze, Koitsu" (Japanese: やるぜ, コイツ)	August 3, 2015
94	19	"An Uncompromising Challenge"; Transliteration: "Dakyounaki Chousen" (Japanese: 妥協なき挑戦)	August 10, 2015
95	20	"With Heads Held High"; Transliteration: "Ue o Muite Arukou" (Japanese: 上を向いて歩こう)	August 17, 2015
96	21	"Whispers of the Devil?"; Transliteration: "Akuma no Sasayaki?" (Japanese: 悪魔のささやき?)	August 24, 2015
97	22	"Winging It"; Transliteration: "Buttsuke Honban" (Japanese: ぶっつけ本番)	August 31, 2015
98	23	"School Academic Level"; Transliteration: "Hensachi" (Japanese: 偏差値)	September 7, 2015
99	24	"Individual Minds"; Transliteration: "Sorezore no Zunou" (Japanese: それぞれの頭脳)	September 14, 2015
100	25	"Zeal"; Transliteration: "Yakudou" (Japanese: 躍動)	September 21, 2015
101	26	"The Conceited Underclassman"; Transliteration: "Namaiki na Kouhai" (Japanese: 生意気な後輩)	September 28, 2015
102	27	"Step By Step"; Transliteration: "Ippo... Mata Ippo to" (Japanese: 一歩... また一歩と)	October 5, 2015
103	28	"The Resilient Second-String"; Transliteration: "Hikae no Iji" (Japanese: 控えの意地)	October 12, 2015
104	29	"Demon Child"; Transliteration: "Akudou" (Japanese: 悪童)	October 19, 2015
105	30	"The Kings' Roar"; Transliteration: "Ouja no Kakegoe" (Japanese: 王者の掛け声)	October 26, 2015
106	31	"The Courage He Gave Me"; Transliteration: "Kare ga Kureta Yūki" (Japanese: 彼がくれた勇気)	November 2, 2015
107	32	"The Resolve for Responsibility"; Transliteration: "Seou Kakugo" (Japanese: 背負う覚悟)	November 9, 2015
108	33	"The Ace's Instinct"; Transliteration: "Ēsu no Hon'nō" (Japanese: エースの本能)	November 16, 2015
109	34	"Innocent"; Transliteration: "Inosento" (Japanese: イノセント)	November 23, 2015
110	35	"The World Beyond"; Transliteration: "Sono Saki no Sekai" (Japanese: その先の世界)	November 30, 2015
111	36	"Rematch"; Transliteration: "Natsu no Tsudzuki" (Japanese: 夏の続き)	December 7, 2015
112	37	"Priorities"; Transliteration: "Yūsen Jun'i" (Japanese: 優先順位)	December 14, 2015
113	38	"One Pitch"; Transliteration: "Ma no Ichi-kyū" (Japanese: 魔の一球)	December 21, 2015
114	39	"Meeting Expectations"; Transliteration: "Kitai ni Kotaetai" (Japanese: 期待に、応えたい)	January 4, 2016
115	40	"Play Ball"; Transliteration: "Maku wa Matana" (Japanese: 幕は待たない)	January 11, 2016
116	41	"The Lead-off Man"; Transliteration: "Toppakō" (Japanese: 突破口)	January 18, 2016
117	42	"Fastball, Featuring Todoroki"; Transliteration: "Todoroki Kyū" (Japanese: 轟 球)	January 25, 2016
118	43	"To This Side"; Transliteration: "Kotchi-gawa e" (Japanese: こっち側へ)	February 1, 2016
119	44	"The Best Fastball"; Transliteration: "Saikō no Sutorēto" (Japanese: 最高のストレート)	February 8, 2016
120	45	"The Field"; Transliteration: "Soko ni Tassha" (Japanese: そこに立っ者)	February 15, 2016
121	46	"The Decision" (Japanese: 独断)	February 22, 2016
122	47	"Partnership" (Japanese: パートナーシップ)	February 29, 2016
123	48	"Party Boys" (Japanese: お祭り男ども)	March 7, 2016
124	49	"Just You Wait!" (Japanese: 待ってろ!)	March 14, 2016
125	50	"Last Inning" (Japanese: ラストイニング)	March 21, 2016
126	51	"Seek Diamonds!"	March 28, 2016

=== Ace of Diamond Act II (2019–2020) ===
No. overall	No. in season	Title	Original air date
127	1	"Beyond the Dream"; Transliteration: "Yume no Saki" (Japanese: 夢の先)	April 2, 2019
128	2	"Wanna Take The Mound"; Transliteration: "Hayaku Tachitai" (Japanese: 早く立ちたい)	April 9, 2019
129	3	"Blessed by the Baseball Gods"; Transliteration: "Yakyū no Moshigo" (Japanese: 野球の申し子)	April 16, 2019
130	4	"The Day It Began"; Transliteration: "Hajimari no Hi" (Japanese: はじまりの日)	April 23, 2019
131	5	"Joining"; Transliteration: "Gōryū" (Japanese: 合流)	April 30, 2019
132	6	"Go Straight"	May 7, 2019
133	7	"KING"	May 14, 2019
134	8	"Camphor"; Transliteration: "Kanfuru-zai" (Japanese: カンフル剤)	May 21, 2019
135	9	"Battle, Battle"; Transliteration: "Batoru×Batoru" (Japanese: バトル×バトル)	May 28, 2019
136	10	"Debut"; Transliteration: "Uijin" (Japanese: 初陣)	June 4, 2019
137	11	"Where You Look"; Transliteration: "Shisen no Saki" (Japanese: 複線の先)	June 11, 2019
138	12	"Selfish"; Transliteration: "Wagamama" (Japanese: ワガママ)	June 18, 2019
139	13	"Batting First"; Transliteration: "Senkō" (Japanese: 先攻)	June 25, 2019
140	14	"Presence"; Transliteration: "Kehai" (Japanese: 気配)	July 2, 2019
141	15	"My Role"; Transliteration: "Jibun no Yakuwari" (Japanese: 自分の役割)	July 9, 2019
142	16	"Only After You've Won"; Transliteration: "Katte koso" (Japanese: 勝ってこそ)	July 16, 2019
143	17	"Three Months"; Transliteration: "3-Kagetsu" (Japanese: 3か月)	July 23, 2019
144	18	"Something to Find Out"; Transliteration: "Tashikameitai mono" (Japanese: 確かめたいもの)	July 30, 2019
145	19	"Competitive Streak"; Transliteration: "Tatakau Shisei" (Japanese: 戦う姿勢)	August 6, 2019
146	20	"Self-Assertive"; Transliteration: "Jikoshuchō" (Japanese: 自己主張)	August 13, 2019
147	21	"Out of Time"; Transliteration: "Jikanganai" (Japanese: 時間がない)	August 20, 2019
148	22	"Designated"; Transliteration: "Shimei" (Japanese: 指名)	August 27, 2019
149	23	"One Pitch, One Second"; Transliteration: "Ichi-kyū Ichi-byō" (Japanese: 一球一秒)	September 3, 2019
150	24	"Incomplete"; Transliteration: "Mikansei" (Japanese: 未完成)	September 10, 2019
151	25	"Unleashed"; Transliteration: "Kaikin" (Japanese: 解禁)	September 17, 2019
152	26	"Beneath the Same Banner"; Transliteration: "Onaji Hata no Shita" (Japanese: 同じ旗の下)	September 24, 2019
153	27	"The Note"	October 1, 2019
154	28	"I'm Not Stopping"; Transliteration: "Toman'ne~ekara na" (Japanese: 止まんねぇからな)	October 8, 2019
155	29	"After Spring Comes"; Transliteration: "Haru, Soshite―" (Japanese: 春、そして―)	October 15, 2019
156	30	"Bloom of Youth"	October 22, 2019
157	31	"Kind of Like a Promise"; Transliteration: "Chikai no Yōna mono" (Japanese: 誓いのようなもの)	October 29, 2019
158	32	"Hunger"; Transliteration: "Katsubō" (Japanese: 渇望)	November 5, 2019
159	33	"Heat Transfer"; Transliteration: "Den'netsu" (Japanese: 伝熱)	November 12, 2019
160	34	"Competition"; Transliteration: "Kyōen" (Japanese: 競演)	November 19, 2019
161	35	"Because He's Awesome"; Transliteration: "Sugē Yatsudakara" (Japanese: スゲー奴だから)	November 26, 2019
162	36	"As a Catcher"; Transliteration: "Hoshi to shite" (Japanese: 捕手として)	December 3, 2019
163	37	"Invincible Mentality"; Transliteration: "Jōshō Shikō" (Japanese: 常勝思考)	December 10, 2019
164	38	"Fragile"; Transliteration: "Furajairu" (Japanese: フラジャイル)	December 17, 2019
165	39	"I'm Counting on You"; Transliteration: "Tanonda zo" (Japanese: 頼んだぞ)	December 24, 2019
166	40	"Expression"; Transliteration: "Tsuragamae" (Japanese: 面構え)	January 7, 2020
167	41	"Shared Fate"; Transliteration: "Unmei Kyōdōtai" (Japanese: 運命共同体)	January 14, 2020
168	42	"20 People"; Transliteration: "20-ri" (Japanese: 20人)	January 21, 2020
169	43	"Summer Training Camp"; Transliteration: "Natsu Gasshuku" (Japanese: 夏合宿)	January 28, 2020
170	44	"Setting Sail"; Transliteration: "Kōshin" (Japanese: 航進)	February 4, 2020
171	45	"Go EXCEED!!"	February 11, 2020
172	46	"Encouragement"; Transliteration: "Gekirei" (Japanese: 激励)	February 18, 2020
173	47	"Under the Feet"; Transliteration: "Ashimoto" (Japanese: 足元)	February 25, 2020
174	48	"Get Back"	March 3, 2020
175	49	"Seido Goes All Out"; Transliteration: "Honki no Seidō" (Japanese: 本気の青道)	March 10, 2020
176	50	"FIRE AGE"	March 17, 2020
177	51	"That's The Reason Why"; Transliteration: "Sorede koso" (Japanese: それでこそ)	March 24, 2020
178	52	"Ace of Diamond"; Transliteration: "Daiya no Ēsu" (Japanese: ダイヤのA(エース))	March 31, 2020

=== Ace of Diamond Act II (season 2) (2026-present) ===
No. overall	No. in season	Title	Original air date
179	1	"To What Lies Ahead"; Transliteration: "Sono saki e" (Japanese: その先へ)	April 5, 2026
180	2	"For The Team"; Transliteration: "Chīmu no tame ni" (Japanese: チームの為に)	April 12, 2026
181	3	"The Path of the Winner"; Transliteration: "Shōsha no michi" (Japanese: 勝者の道)	April 19, 2026
182	4	"Bang!"; Transliteration: "Gōon" (Japanese: 轟音)	April 26, 2026
183	5	"Discomfort"; Transliteration: "Iwakan" (Japanese: 違和感)	May 3, 2026
184	6	"First Showcase"; Transliteration: "Ohirome" (Japanese: お披露目)	May 10, 2026
185	7	"Things That Have Been Built Up"; Transliteration: "Tsumiagete kita mono" (Japanese: 積み上げてきたもの)	May 17, 2026

== OVAs ==
No.	Title	Original air date
1	"Face"	November 17, 2014
Kominato Ryosuke returns home after being away for 10 months and bonds with his younger brother Haruichi.
2	"Out Run"	January 16, 2015
Despite being a trouble-maker, Kuramochi gets an offer to play in Seidou High School.
3	"Boys Be..."	March 17, 2015
The story of Kawakami Norifumi during his first year in Seidou High.
4	"The Seido Diary"	July 15, 2016
The story of the Seidou High School Baseball team after the Autumn Tournament.
5	"Glory"	August 15, 2017
The story of Isashiki Jun, and the rest of the third years of Seidou High, after the Autumn Tournament.
