= List of Saint Seiya: The Lost Canvas episodes =

Cover of the first Saint Seiya: The Lost Canvas DVD released in Japan by VAP featuring Tenma and Alone

The original video animations (OVAs) series Saint Seiya: The Lost Canvas is based on the manga series with the same name authored by Shiori Teshirogi. It premièred in Japan on June 24, 2009. The production is by TMS Entertainment while Osamu Nabeshima is the series director and Yoshiyuki Suga the chief writer. Set in the 18th century, 243 years before the events of Masami Kurumada's Saint Seiya manga, The Lost Canvas focuses on how an orphan named Tenma becomes one of Athena's 88 warriors known as saints and finds himself in a war fighting against his best friend Alone who is revealed to be the reincarnation of Athena's biggest enemy, the god of the underworld, Hades.

The first season comprises thirteen OVAs, each 30 minutes in length. All the OVA episodes were released on DVD and Blu-ray format by VAP. Season 1 ended on April 21 with the release of the eleventh, twelfth and thirteenth episodes. The second season premièred on February 23, 2011, adding thirteen more OVAs to the series season 2 ended on July 20 with the release of OVAs 24, 25, and 26. In January 2011, Crunchyroll announced they would stream the series on the United States, Canada, the United Kingdom, and Ireland. In August 2018, it was revealed that VSI Los Angeles had been commissioned by Netflix to make an English dub to the series.

The original design was unveiled at the Tokyo International Anime Fair 2009. The seasons use two musical themes with the opening theme being "The Realm of Athena" by EUROX, while the ending theme is "Leash of Flower" (花の鎖, Hana no Kusari), by Maki Ikuno featuring Marina del Ray. The remaining tracks were developed by Kaoru Wada.

It was confirmed in May 2013 via its Twitter official account, that TMS has currently no plans to produce a third season for The Lost Canvas anime adaptation.

Season	Episodes	DVD and Blu-ray release dates						
Season	Episodes	Volume 1	Volume 2	Volume 3	Volume 4	Volume 5	Volume 6	Complete OVA series
1	13	June 24, 2009	August 21, 2009	October 21, 2009	December 23, 2009	February 23, 2010	April 21, 2010	December 8, 2015 (North American)
2	13	February 23, 2011	March 18, 2011	April 20, 2011	May 18, 2011	June 22, 2011	July 20, 2011	December 8, 2015 (North American)

== Episode list ==
=== Season 1 (2009–2010) ===
No.	Title	Original release date
1	"Promise to atena" Transliteration: "Yakusoku" (Japanese: 約束)	June 24, 2009
In a small town in Italy, Tenma and his best friend Alone are living in peace at an orphanage. Alone is an aspiring painter and visits the cathedral where he hears about a painting that is so beautiful it is said to redeem souls. While painting in a meadow, Alone is approached by Pandora. She tells him that he is the purest human soul and therefore he will one day be the vessel of Hades, King of the Underworld. After a flood threatens his home village, Tenma awakens his cosmos in order to reroute the flood's path. Libra Dohko happened to be in the area and witnesses Tenma's skills. He offers to take Tenma to the Sanctuary in Greece so that he may train as a Saint. Before he departs for Greece, Tenma vows to become Saint and Alone vows to become a true painter.
2	"Awakening of Hades"; Transliteration: "Hādesu kakusei" (Japanese: ハーデス覚醒)	June 24, 2009
At the Sanctuary, Tenma begins his training and meets Yato. Tenma manages to find Sasha, Alone's younger sister. Sasha is attacked by Worm Raimi, until Shion Aries vanquishes him. Tenma then learns that Sasha is the reincarnation of Athena. Two years later, Tenma becomes the Pegasus Saint after winning his rank rightfully in a combat. Back in Italy, Alone is suffering as learns that any living creature he paints ends up dying. Pandora appears before Alone and she takes him to the cathedral in the forest. She shows him the painting he had been yearning to see, and Alone then awakens as Hades.
3	"The Holy War Starts"; Transliteration: "Seisen shidō" (Japanese: 聖戦始動)	August 21, 2009
Three Silver Saints are revived by Hades to kill Sasha, but are defeated by Dohko and Shion. As a selfpunishment for killing their comrades, Dohko and Shion go to Tenma's hometown in Italy where Specters, Hades' soldiers, have been located. Upon realizing that each of his friends have been killed, Tenma finds Alone who destroys a painting of Tenma which causes his death. Dohko tries to avenge Tenma but he is confronted by the Specter Bennu Kagaho and convinced by Shion to retreat.
4	"The Prayer Wreath"; Transliteration: "Inori no hanawa" (Japanese: 祈りの花輪)	August 21, 2009
Another Bronze Saint lost in the previous fight, Unicorn Yato, finds Tenma's dead body and is guided by a woman named Yuzuriha to an area known as Jamir. There, Yuzuriha's master reveals that Tenma can be revived if his soul is brought from the Underworld as his body is preserved by Sasha's Cosmos infused Leash of Flowers. Yato and Yuzuriha go to the Underworld where they find Tenma's soul imprisoned by the Specters. Tenma is able to free himself and joins Yato and Yuzuriha.
5	"Poison Rose"; Transliteration: "Doku bara" (Japanese: 毒薔薇)	October 21, 2009
Griffin Minos, one of three Hades' three most powerful Specters known as "Judges", and his men arrive at the Sanctuary and kill of several Athena Saints. Their march toward the Sanctuary is stopped by a field of red roses, which kills several Specters as they try to cross. The Pisces Gold Saint, Albafica makes his presence known before the invading Specters and easily kills off a few more Specters. The Specter Deep Niobe intercedes and neutralizes the poisonous flower field with his own poison. In order to protect a nearby village, Albafica absorbs the poison into his own body, and then kills Niobe. Minos steps in, and manages to restrain the Albafica with his cosmic marionettion and orders his men to destroy the nearby village as a way of taunting Albafica. Minos vows to break every bone in Albafica's body with his puppeteering ability, but the Pisces Saint proves to be resilient.
6	"Procession of Funeral Flowers"; Transliteration: "Hana sōretsu" (Japanese: 花葬列)	October 21, 2009
Albafica tells Minos that his men will perish, and as they reach the outskirts of the village they are killed off by a bloody rose trap. Minos finds this amusing and applauds the Pisces Saint for living up the image of a Gold Saint. Albafica temporarily breaks free but to no avail, and is recaptured by Minos who then proceeds to snap the life out of Albafica. Minos goes to the nearby village, and begins to destroy it. The Aries Saint, Shion steps in but is also overpowered by Minos' technique. Shion is saved by Albafica who survived having almost every bone in his body snapped. Albafica fights Minos once more and is successful in planting a bloody rose in the Specter's heart. Minos tries to take out the village before he dies, but he is contained by Shion who leaves him no choice but to wait for death. Having used up all his blood, Albafica dies shortly after Minos.
7	"Fruit of the Sapindus"; Transliteration: "Mokurenji no mi" (Japanese: 木欒子の実)	December 23, 2009
Yuzuriha reveals to Tenma and Yato that their real mission is to pick the fruits of the legendary Sapindus tree that grows in the underworld. On their way, they are found by Hell's Watchdog Cerberus and Alone, who tries to lure the Pegasus Saint into his army and then reveals his plans to invade the Sanctuary. As the last and most unexpected obstacle, Tenma is challenged by the ominous Gold Saint Virgo Asmita, who seems to doubt Athena's capacity to keep peace in the world.
8	"Day of Breeze"; Transliteration: "Yoki kaze no hi" (Japanese: 良き風の日)	December 23, 2009
Picking 108 fruits of the Sapindus tree, Tenma, Yato and Yuzuriha start their way back to the world of the living. Meanwhile, Specters head towards Jamir and find themselves caught in Virgo Asmita's trap. Returning to life, Tenma, Yato and Yuzuriha are reunited with Hakurei, who explains the true purpose behind the fruits of the Sapindus tree: they will be able to seal the Specters' souls and prevent their resurrection; however, in order to do that, they need to be empowered by the essence of cosmo: the Eight Sense. Virgo Asmita achieves this, and seals the attacking Specter's souls. Virgo Asmita then disappears, having apparently sacrificed his life in order to bless the rosary.
9	"Giant Star"; Transliteration: "Kyosei" (Japanese: 巨星)	February 23, 2010
Minos' Specters, previously killed by Pisces Albafica's Bloody Rose trap, are brought back to life. Now, they find themselves face to face with Taurus Aldebaran, who proves to be capable of dealing with them with his arms crossed. While Aldebaran and Dohko patrol the Sanctuary's vicinity, Bennu Kagaho arrives, seeking revenge against the Libra Saint – however, he meets Taurus instead, and they start a furious battle: the fastest Specter against the fastest Gold Saint.
10	"Descent"; Transliteration: "Kōrin" (Japanese: 降臨)	February 23, 2010
The fight between Aldebaran and Kagaho reaches its climax. Bennu recalls old memories with the arrival of the Taurus Saint's disciples, and decides to take on his opponent with full power; on the other hand, Aldebaran decides to unleash his most powerful technique in order to end the battle. During the night, peace is shaken: Alone himself invades the Sanctuary and wreaks destruction, forcing the Gold Saints into submission with his grand Cosmo. Sagittarius Sisyphus resists and shoots a golden arrow at Hades. The god deflects the arrow and it pierces alongside Sisyphus' heart leaving the Gold Saint comatose. Sasha then steps in to fight her older brother.
11	"Now Unreachable"; Transliteration: "Mō todokanai" (Japanese: もう届かない)	April 21, 2010
Tenma returns before Sasha and Alone and the three childhood friends are reunited at last. Alone unleashes his guard dog Cerberus on Tenma and Sasha, but they evade the three headed dog. Tenma defeats Cerberus, but is rendered useless when trying to strike Alone. Pope Sage shows himself having surrounded Hades with hundreds of talismans he inherited from the previous Athena. It is revealed that Sage was the Gold Cancer Saint of the previous holy war, as Hades is weakened the power of the talismans. As Sage prepare to seal Hades' soul, Pandora steps in and renders the talismans useless before convincing Alone to leave. Before doing so, the unfinished Lost Canvas appears in the sky above and Alone reveals the world will end when his painting completely covers the sky.
12	"Sacrifice That Will Not Fade"; Transliteration: "Taenai gisei" (Japanese: 絶えない犠牲)	April 21, 2010
Hypnos and Thanatos confront Pandora on how she let Hades out of her sight. Having concerns whether it is Hades or Alone that is running the show, Pandora feels that Tenma must die in order for Hades to truly be in control. Pandora sends two assassins: Bat Wimber and Dullhan Cube. Wimber's bats put everyone in the Sanctuary to sleep. As the two Specters are about to kill Tenma, Taurus Aldebaran steps in; having destroyed his hearing. The two Specters severely beat up the Taurus Saint and reopen his wounds that were inflicted by Bennu Kagaho. In the end, he sacrifices his life and fends them both off, protecting Tenma.
13	"The Journey Starts"; Transliteration: "Tabidachi" (Japanese: 旅立ち)	April 21, 2010
Guilty over Taurus Albebaran's sacrifice, Tenma tries to leave the Sanctuary and face Alone by himself. He is intercepted by Cancer Manigoldo and is incarcerated on Sage's orders as he is valuable in the fight against Hades. Hakurei returns to the Sanctuary and convinces his brother Sage to let Tenma go. Yato and Yuzuriha break him out of his imprisonment and accompany him on the journey towards Hades' castle.

=== Season 2 (2011) ===
No.	Title	Original release date
14	"Forest of the Dead"; Transliteration: "Shi no mori" (Japanese: 死の森)	February 23, 2011
Pandora seals away Alone in his quarters so that he can focus on the creation of the Lost Canvas, and completely awaken as Hades. In the shadows, Hades's councillors Hypnos and Thanatos, worried about the Pegasus Saint and his connections to Hades, begin to take action. At the Pope's orders, the Cancer Saint Manigoldo follows after Tenma. On his way to Hades's Cathedral, Tenma reaches the spot where his old village was destroyed, but in its place he finds a gigantic and sinister forest.
15	"If I Could Return to That Day"; Transliteration: "Moshi ano hi ni kaeretara" (Japanese: もしあの日に帰れたら)	February 23, 2011
Upon entering the Forest of the Dead, Yuzuriha is separated from the others. She is confronted by her brother Tokusa, who she thought died years ago. His voice sends her back to the past. Meanwhile, Yato is cornered by a giant centipede. As his consciousness fades, he too remembers his past, and thinks about his reason to fight. Will the two arrive in time to help Tenma in his desperate battle against the dreadful Specter Veronica?
16	"Gods and Pawns"; Transliteration: "Kami to koma" (Japanese: 神と駒)	March 18, 2011
Tenma, Yato, and Yuzuriha are surrounded by Veronica's zombies, only to be saved by the Cancer Saint, Manigoldo. Manigoldo had come to protect Tenma at the Pope's orders. With his overwhelming power, he splits Veronica's body in two. But even this isn't enough to kill the Specter, and Veronica tries to cause them all to rot along with the forest. Meanwhile, the twin gods Hypnos and Thanatos watch the battle from their palace as they play chess…
17	"Valueless"; Transliteration: "Chiriakuta" (Japanese: 塵芥)	March 18, 2011
Cancer Manigoldo finds the location of the twin gods, but is helpless before the might of Thanatos, the god of death. Pope Sage arrives to help his disciple. As he struggles to withstand Thanatos's attacks, Manigoldo remembers how he met Sage when he was young... the Cancer Saint, a war orphan, once thought that human life was valueless... as Thanatos finally reveals his true strength and unleashes his divine wrath, is there any way for master and pupil to win?
18	"I Just Want You to Live"; Transliteration: "Tada ikite hoshii" (Japanese: ただ生きてほしい)	April 20, 2011
Thanatos finally gets serious after being wounded by Manigoldo. But even in the worst position imaginable, Sage doesn't falter. "Don't use the word despair so loosely", he says, and Manigoldo remembers his old days with his master and the desperation he felt when he saw the destiny of humans after death, regaining hope and determination to fight. The two use their Sekishiki Meikai Ha attack in a desperate attempt, and end up succeeding in separating Thanatos' soul from his physical body, but that isn't enough to defeat the god of death. Manigoldo sacrifices himself in order to destroy Thanatos' physical body, leaving the god an exposed soul before Sage. Thanatos tries to possess Sage but finds himself trapped when the Pope reveals that he is wearing Hakurei's Altar Cloth. Thanatos tries to free himself by tearing Sage from within, but the Pope fights the battle to the bitter end and successfully seals Thanatos' soul, dying shortly afterwards.
19	"Lonely Sword"; Transliteration: "Kokō no ken" (Japanese: 孤高の剣)	April 20, 2011
Hypnos gathers his subordinates, the Four Gods who control dreams. One of them, the beastly Vision Icelus, appears in the Sagittarius Temple, avoiding Capricorn El Cid's attacks, and steals the soul of the unconscious Sisyphos. El Cid leaves the Sanctuary alone to get it back. El Cid, who had always been by Sisyphos's side, Knows the reason why he wouldn't wake up.
20	"Prison of Dreams"; Transliteration: "Yume no Rōgoku" (Japanese: 夢の牢獄)	May 18, 2011
Nearing Hades's Cathedral, Tenma suddenly finds himself standing before his village, seemingly undamaged. He can't shake the feeling something is wrong as Alone and Sasha – who appear as their children selves – tell him everything up until now has been a dream... the truth, however, is the other way round. Carrying out Hypnos's orders, the dream gods trapped Tenma, Yato, Yuzuriha, and Sisyphos in dream prisons; deep inside their realm – the Dream World.
21	"Beyond the Dream"; Transliteration: "Yume no Saki Ni" (Japanese: 夢の先に)	May 18, 2011
With one of the four gods down, El Cid finds himself confronted by Icelus. The beastly god continues to overpower El Cid with his dimensional abilities, but the Capricorn Saint is determined to rescue Sisyphos. Meanwhile, Tenma fights his way out of his dream prison and faces against Morpheus.
22	"The Path of Righteousness"; Transliteration: "Taigi no michi" (Japanese: 大義の道)	June 22, 2011
Tenma and El Cid are helpless before the combined might of Oneiros and his fellow Dream Gods: Phantasos, Icelos and Morpheus. But Athena appears in the Dream World in order to save Sisyphos; Tenma and El Cid begin the fight anew to protect Athena, and succeed in removing Oneiros from the Dream World, taking the fight into the real world.
23	"Sacred Sword"; Transliteration: "Seiken" (Japanese: 聖剣)	June 22, 2011
Athena enters Sisyphos's dream. There she finds that Sisyphos torn by guilt over taking her away from Alone and Tenma. He thinks he ruined her life, and caused the Holy War. Athena risks her life to attempt to persuade him to open his heart and rise from darkness. With Sisyphos awakened back at the Sanctuary, he shoots an arrow blessed by Athena toward Oneiros. El Cid uses his Excalibur to break the arrow into four pieces, piercing the souls of the four Dream Gods simultaneously. In a last-ditch effort, Oneiros charges toward Tenma so that he too would perish in the imminent explosion of his soul. El Cid fends off Oneiros by lifting himself and the dream God into the sky, sacrificing himself to protect Tenma and his friends as Oneiros explodes.
24	"Time of Bloody Battles"; Transliteration: "Kessen no toki" (Japanese: 血戦の時)	July 20, 2011
With the four Dream Gods finally vanquished, Hypnos's divine barrier is lifted, and Athena's forces are free to march forward into Hades's Cathedral! Hakurei gives them a rousing speech posing as Sage, then enters the Cathedral alone to fulfill his deep-seated vengeance against Hypnos, who killed his comrades in the previous Holy War. Meanwhile, as Alone paints the Lost Canvas in the depths of the Dream World, Hypnos plays with his mind in order to turn him into the real King Hades.
25	"How Many Months and Years"; Transliteration: "Ikuseisou" (Japanese: 幾星霜)	July 20, 2011
Hakurei ventures into the Cathedral alone, protected by a blade blessed by the previous incarnation of Athena. He tears apart the opposing Specters until he reaches the center of Hades's dark barrier that permeates the castle and hinders the Saints. When he attempts to destroy it with his sword, Hypnos appears, revealing to have intercepted and defeated Hakurei's pupils Shion and Yuzuriha. Will Hakurei be able to take down the foe he has hated since the last Holy War?
26	"Let You Be Yourself"; Transliteration: "Omae rashiku are" (Japanese: お前らしくあれ)	July 20, 2011
Hakurei finally defeats and seals Hypnos' soul by using his most powerful technique, the Seikishiki Tenryōha, with the aid from his deceased fellow Saints from the last Holy War. However, Hakurei is murdered by Hades just as he was about to destroy the dark barrier. Shion, enraged, attacks Hades causing him no harm. Amidst all this debacle, Dohko, Tenma and Yato arrive to join Shion and Yuzuriha. The Pegasus Saint fights Hades, but the King of the Underworld overpowers him. On the verge of an imminent death, Tenma is safely teleported by Shion along with Yato and Yuzuriha. Dohko stays behind and distracts Hades long enough to ensure his comrades escape, seemingly sacrificing himself in the process.
