= List of Puchimas! Petit Idolmaster episodes =

Puchimas! Petit Idolmaster is an original net animation series by Gathering based on the comedy manga by Akane, which is itself a spin-off of Bandai Namco Games' The Idolmaster franchise. The series revolves around the idols of 765 Production as they are joined by super-deformed versions of themselves known as Puchidols. The first season was streamed on Animate.tv and Niconico every weekday between January 1 and March 29, 2013. Funimation began simulcasting the series from January 14, 2013. A second season, titled Puchimas!! Petit Petit Idolmaster, was streamed between April 1, 2014, and June 30, 2014.

The opening theme is "La♪La♪La♪ Wonderland" (ら♪ら♪ら♪わんだぁらんど, Ra♪Ra♪Ra♪ Wandārando). For the first season, the main ending theme for episodes 1-23 is "A-ri-ga-to Yesterdays" (あ・り・が・と・YESTERDAYS; "Thank You Yesterdays") by Haruka (Eriko Nakamura), Makoto (Hiromi Hirata), Miki (Akiko Hasegawa) and Ritsuko (Naomi Wakabayashi), the ending theme for episodes 24-43 is "Today With Me" by Chihaya (Asami Imai), Yukiho (Azumi Asakura), Hibiki (Manami Numakura), Ami and Mami (Asami Shimoda), and the ending theme for episodes 44-63 is "Maybe Tomorrow" by Yayoi (Mayako Nigo), Takane (Yumi Hara), Azusa (Chiaki Takahashi) and Iori (Rie Kugimiya), and the ending theme for episodes 64 and OVA is "La♪La♪La♪Wonderland" by 765PRO ALLSTARS featuring the Puchidols. For the second season, the first ending theme for episodes 1-13 and 15-25 is "Ohayo Sunshine" (オハヨ○サンシャイン, Ohayo Sanshain; "Good Morning Sunshine") by Yayoi, Iori, Hibiki, Ami, and Mami, the second ending theme for episode 14 is "Hitoribotchi no Uta" (1人ぼっちの歌; "The All Alone Song") by the Producer (Junji Majima), the third ending theme for episodes 26-50 is "Hello Lunch Time" (ハロー＊ランチタイム, Harō Ranchitaimu) by Ritsuko, Makoto, Haruka and Chihaya, the fourth ending theme for episodes 51-73 is "Good Night Stars" (グッナイ☆スターズ, Gunnai Sutāzu) by Azusa, Takane, Yukiho and Miki, and the fifth ending theme for episodes 74 is "La♪La♪La♪ Wonderland Tropical Remix" (ら♪ら♪ら♪わんだぁらんど とろぴかるRemix, Ra♪Ra♪Ra♪ Wandārando toropikaru Rimikkusu) by 765PRO ALLSTARS featuring the Puchidols.

== Episode list ==
=== Puchimas! Petit Idolmaster (2013) ===
No. in season	Title	Original release date
Director's Cut Episode 1: Tiny Puchidols
1	"Tiny Puchidols"; Transliteration: "Chitcha na Puchidoru" (Japanese: ちっちゃなぷちどる)	January 1, 2013
Ami and Mami discover a miniaturised versions of Yukiho and Miki named Yukipo and Afuu and try and convince the Producer and Ritsuko to let them stay.
2	"Everyday Scenes"; Transliteration: "Itsumo no Fūkei" (Japanese: いつものふうけい)	January 2, 2013
Yukipo digs a hole in the floor to sleep in while rowdy Afuu escapes Ritsuko's grip to ram the male weakness of the Producer, the only male character.
3	"Refreshing Beginning"; Transliteration: "Sawayaka na Hajimari" (Japanese: さわやかなはじまり)	January 3, 2013
Afuu shows little appreciation of onigiri's grand introduction by the Futami twins, stealing and consuming the exemplar almost instantly. Yukipo gives Ritsuki a back rub.
Director's Cut Episode 2: Sudden Appearance
4	"Eat or Be Eaten"; Transliteration: "Kūka Kuwareruka" (Japanese: くうかくわれるか)	January 4, 2013
Miki returns from a recent trip and starts a hunger-based rivalry with Afu.
5	"Faceoff"; Transliteration: "Teawase" (Japanese: てあわせ)	January 7, 2013
Miki and Afu eventually stop fighting and make up.
6	"Good-for-nothing"; Transliteration: "Kaishōnashi" (Japanese: かいしょうなし)	January 8, 2013
Yukipo gives Producer some comfort after he is thrown out with the trash. (This episode marked the first time where 765 Pro girls are absent.)
Director's Cut Episode 3: Where'd She Come From
7	"Worldwide"; Transliteration: "Wārudowaido" (Japanese: わーるどわいど)	January 9, 2013
It is revealed that Miki has brought home a Puchidol version of Chihaya named Chihya that she found on her vacation.
8	"A Variety of Body Types"; Transliteration: "Iroiro na Taikei" (Japanese: いろいろなたいけい)	January 10, 2013
Chihya is put under Chihaya's care whilst Kotori admires her cuteness whilst eating lunch.
9	"A Good Friend"; Transliteration: "Ii Nakama" (Japanese: いいなかま)	January 11, 2013
Chihya is given a name and has various reasons for liking and disliking others.
Director's Cut Episode 4: Wandering Traveler
10	"A Deserted Island for Some Reason"; Transliteration: "Naze ka Mujintō" (Japanese: なぜかむじんとう)	January 14, 2013
Iori, Yayoi and the Producer wind up stuck on a remote island. (This episode marks the first time where the Puchidols are absent.)
11	"Madly in Love"; Transliteration: "Zokkon Rabu" (Japanese: ぞっこんらぶ)	January 15, 2013
Whilst hiding from the rain, Iori encounters several Puchidol versions of Haruka.
12	"Left Behind"; Transliteration: "Nokosareta Hito" (Japanese: のこされたひと)	January 16, 2013
Yayoi rescues Iori from the wave of Puchidol Harukas and brings one with them as they return home.
Director's Cut Episode 5: A Surprising Trait
13	"Normalcy"; Transliteration: "Itsumodōri" (Japanese: いつもどおり)	January 17, 2013
Chaos ensues in the office when Haruka inadvertently spills water on the newly dubbed 'Haruka-san', causing it to multiply.
14	"A Close Call!?"; Transliteration: "Kiki Ippatsu!?" (Japanese: ききいっぱつ!?)	January 18, 2013
Iori, Ami and Mami almost manage to hide from the masses of Haruka-sans, only to have it backfire when the Producer arrives.
15	"I Can't Take It Anymore!"; Transliteration: "Mō Kanben Naranu!" (Japanese: もうかんべんならぬ！)	January 21, 2013
Ritsuko manages to get the Haruka-sans in line with her fearsome aura.
Director's Cut Episode 6: Wonderful New Character
16	"A Peaceful Day"; Transliteration: "Nodoka na Ichinichi" (Japanese: のどかないちにち)	January 22, 2013
Hibiki is confused when Miki, Yayoi and Takane bring a kotatsu into the office for their meeting.
17	"Puchidol Language"; Transliteration: "Puchidoru no Kotoba" (Japanese: ぷちどるのことば)	January 23, 2013
Whilst playing a game of Old Maid, it is revealed Hibiki and Yayoi are able to understand what the Puchidols are saying.
18	"And Stuf!"; Transliteration: "Chan♪Chan♪" (Japanese: ちゃん♪ちゃん♪)	January 24, 2013
Ritsuko soon finds out about the kotatsu and punishes those involved.
Director's Cut Episode 7: Help
19	"Lots and Lots of Locks"; Transliteration: "Dossari Fussari" (Japanese: どっさりふっさり)	January 25, 2013
As Chihaya asks Hibiki and Yayoi for help in looking after Chihya, Takane takes a dubious liking to her.
20	"Birds of a Feather Flock Together"; Transliteration: "Rui wa Tomo o Yobu" (Japanese: るいはともをよぶ)	January 28, 2013
As Chihaya explains how she's been having trouble sleeping out of fear of being suffocated by Chihya's hair, Takane reveals another Puchidol.
21	"Chum"; Transliteration: "Makie" (Japanese: まきえ)	January 29, 2013
Takane explains how she picked up the new Puchidol, Yayo, three months earlier.
Director's Cut Episode 8: New Employee
22	"Thought Transference"; Transliteration: "Ishin Denshin" (Japanese: いしんでんしん)	January 30, 2013
Ritsuko becomes annoyed when Kotori brings in a Puchidol version of her named Chicchan.
23	"Similar?"; Transliteration: "Miteru kana?" (Japanese: みてるかな?)	January 31, 2013
Chicchan shows she is capable of handling work, the Puchidols and the adults, but not the Producer.
24	"Tiny Twins"; Transliteration: "Chitcha na Futago" (Japanese: ちっちゃなふたご)	February 1, 2013
Azusa returns from a three month trip, bringing back two new Puchidols, Koami and Komami.
Director's Cut Episode 9: Head Over Tiny Heels
25	"Wiggle Waggle"; Transliteration: "Kune Kune Kunyā" (Japanese: くねくねくにゃぁ)	February 4, 2013
Hibiki becomes curious about how Takane gets along with the Puchidols.
26	"Same Wavelength"; Transliteration: "Tsūkā" (Japanese: つうかあ)	February 5, 2013
Koami and Komami start playing pranks around the office.
Director's Cut Episode 10: Teeny Tiny
27	"Flustered Kotori"; Transliteration: "Tenpari Kotori" (Japanese: てんぱりことり)	February 6, 2013
A new Puchidol, Piyo-Piyo, shows up at the office, much to Kotori's delight.
28	"A Pairing?"; Transliteration: "Neruton?" (Japanese: ねるとん？)	February 7, 2013
Miki brings home another Puchidol named Makochi who Makoto and Hibiki fight over.
29	"Way Bushed"; Transliteration: "Dēji Hokkori" (Japanese: でーじほっこり)	February 8, 2013
Makoto and Kotori become protective of Makochi and Piyo-Piyo.
Director's Cut Episode 11: Overseas Yet Again
30	"Oh, Suddenly I'm in Egypt"; Transliteration: "Aa Kidzuitara Ejiputo" (Japanese: あぁきづいたらえじぷと)	February 11, 2013
Yayoi drags Iori and Yukiho to Egypt, where they discover they have also brought Haruka-san along with them.
31	"Lurking Inside"; Transliteration: "Soko ni Hisonderu" (Japanese: そこにひそんでる)	February 12, 2013
Yukiho struggles with getting used to Haruka-san.
32	"Safe Return"; Transliteration: "Buji Kikoku" (Japanese: ぶじきこく)	February 13, 2013
Whilst exploring a pyramid, Iori and Yayoi find another Puchidol named Miura-san.
Director's Cut Episode 12: Sky-High
33	"Absolutely Not?"; Transliteration: "Honto ni Dame?" (Japanese: ほんとにだめ？)	February 14, 2013
The idols have trouble keeping track of Miura-san as she teleports all over the office.
34	"Gotcha"; Transliteration: "Tsukmaeta" (Japanese: つかまえたっ)	February 15, 2013
Azusa comes across Miura-san and is teleported to Africa, where Miki has found another Puchidol named Io.
35	"Shiny Forehead"; Transliteration: "Peka Peka Odeko" (Japanese: ぺかぺかおでこ)	February 18, 2013
Azusa and Miki get stuck at the airport but return thanks to Miura-san's power.
Director's Cut Episode 13: I Really Am A Girl
36	"Pride on the Line"; Transliteration: "Puraido o Kakete" (Japanese: ぷらいどをかけて)	February 19, 2013
Afu, whose hair changes with the seasons, takes a liking towards men, which includes Makoto despite her making a point of being a girl.
37	"Why Only Two Without Three?"; Transliteration: "Nido Aru Koto wa" (Japanese: にどあることは)	February 20, 2013
Makoto finds it hard to deal with Afu's affections for her.
Director's Cut Episode 14: Hello Tiny Person
38	"Playgirl"; Transliteration: "Pureigāru" (Japanese: ぷれいがーる)	February 21, 2013
Hibiki feels downhearted that she doesn't have her own Puchidol to play with.
39	"Distrust of People"; Transliteration: "Kongen Fushin" (Japanese: にんげんふしん)	February 22, 2013
After revealing she has brought along another Puchidol named Chibiki, Takane leaves her and Hibiki stranded in Brazil.
40	"Finally, Y'Know!"; Transliteration: "Yatto dazo" (Japanese: やっとだぞ)	February 25, 2013
Whilst waiting for Iori to finish a photo shoot and take them home, Chibiki decides she wants to live with Hibiki.
Director's Cut Episode 15: For Love
41	"Harmonious"; Transliteration: "Waki Aiai" (Japanese: わきあいあい)	February 26, 2013
Takane finds another Puchidol named Takanya and tries to find someone to look after her.
42	"I Love Ramen"; Transliteration: "Rāmen Daisuki" (Japanese: らあめんだいすき)	February 27, 2013
After some pressure from Ritsuko, Takanya is taken in by Ami and Mami.
Director's Cut Episode 16: Definitely Can't Win
43	"Don't Let Victory Lower Your Guard"; Transliteration: "Katte Kabuto no O o Shimeyo" (Japanese: かってかぶとのおをしめよ)	February 28, 2013
Ami and Mami get Chihaya to play some games with her.
44	"Who's Number One?"; Transliteration: "Ichiban wa Dare?" (Japanese: いちばんはだれ？)	March 1, 2013
Makochi proves to be a tough opponent when it comes to video games.
45	"The Showdown Finally Ends!"; Transliteration: "Tsuini Ketchaku!" (Japanese: ついにけっちゃく！)	March 4, 2013
Chichan teams up with Chihaya to beat Ami and Mami.
Director's Cut Episode 17: Swimming Competition
46	"Teh-Teh-Teh"; Transliteration: "Tettettē" (Japanese: てってってー)	March 5, 2013
Ritsuko holds a swim meet where the idols pair up with their respective Puchidols.
47	"It's My Job"; Transliteration: "Shigoto desukara" (Japanese: しごとですから)	March 6, 2013
The Puchidols take part in a 25m swim event.
48	"Will There Be a Slip?"; Transliteration: "Aru kana? Porori" (Japanese: あるかな？ポロリ)	March 7, 2013
As the next set of teams prepare to compete, Ami and Mami argue when they both want Takanya.
49	"Excitement Carnival"; Transliteration: "Waki Waki Kānibaru" (Japanese: わきわきかーにばる)	March 8, 2013
The second set of Puchidols compete in a foam log race.
50	"A Battle of Life and Death"; Transliteration: "Seishi o Kaketa Tatakai" (Japanese: せいしをかけたたたかい)	March 11, 2013
Everyone participates in the final except for Haruka, who is forced to sing the theme song. That is, until Harukasan jumps into the pool and fills it by replicating.
Director's Cut Episode 18: Help, Hibiki-san!
51	"I'll Stich With You"; Transliteration: "Anata ni Tsuite Iku" (Japanese: あなたについていく)	March 12, 2013
Following a prank by Koami and Komami, Chibiki and Yayo end up getting their hair tangled together.
52	"How'd It Turn Out This Way!?"; Transliteration: "Nande Kō Naruno!?" (Japanese: なんでこうなるの!?)	March 13, 2013
Chibiki gets help from some of her animal friends to help get her and Yayo to Hibiki.
53	"Travel Companions Make a Journey Great"; Transliteration: "Tabi wa Michidure Yo wa Nasake" (Japanese: たびはみちづれよはなさけ)	March 14, 2013
Chibiki and Yayo manage to find Hibiki, who helps get them untangled.
Director's Cut Episode 19: Speed Across the World
54	"In Real Trouble Now!"; Transliteration: "Noppiki Naranu!" (Japanese: のっぴきならぬ!)	March 15, 2013
Ritsuko and Miura-san are tasked with recovering several Haruka-san clones that have spread all over the world.
55	"Heave-ho!"; Transliteration: "Soiya! Soiya!" (Japanese: そいや！そいや！)	March 18, 2013
Ritsuko continues her search for the missing Haruka-sans.
56	"Vacation!?"; Transliteration: "Bakansu!?" (Japanese: ばかんす!?)	March 19, 2013
Ritsuko returns to learn the Haruka-san chase was all to get her out of the office so the Producer could arrange a surprise party.
Director's Cut Episode 20: Small Happiness
57	"A Day of Smiles"; Transliteration: "Nicoyaka na Ichinichi" (Japanese: にこやかないちにち)	March 20, 2013
The episode looks at the day in the life of Yukipo.
Director's Cut Episode 21: Look At Me
58	"It's Showtime!"; Transliteration: "Ittsu Shōtaimu!" (Japanese: いっつしょーたいむ！)	March 21, 2013
Ami and Mami play tricks on some sleeping Puchidols.
59	"A Painful Blow?"; Transliteration: "Tsūkon no Isageki?" (Japanese: つうこんのいちげき？)	March 22, 2013
Ami and Mami continue their pranks with disastrous results.
60	"Is This the End!?"; Transliteration: "Mohaya Kore Made ka!?" (Japanese: もはやこれまでか！？)	March 25, 2013
The Puchidols decide to give Ami and Mami some payback when they fall asleep.
Director's Cut Episode 22: Sidetracked Along the Way
61	"Tiny Errands"; Transliteration: "Puchi Otsukai♪" (Japanese: ぷちおつかい♪)	March 26, 2013
Chihya attempts to deliver a script to Chihaya before her audition.
62	"Tick-tock Tick-tock"; Transliteration: "Chiku Taku Chiky Taku" (Japanese: ちくたくちくたく)	March 27, 2013
Chihya, joined by Takanya and Yayo, ask Miura-san for her help.
63	"Just Barely"; Transliteration: "Dō ni ka Kō ni ka" (Japanese: どうにかこうにか)	March 28, 2013
With Miura-san's help, Chihya manages to deliver the script to Chihaya just in time.
Director's Cut Episode 23: Like Attracts Like
64	"Like Attracts Like"; Transliteration: "Rui wa Tomo o Yobu" (Japanese: るいはともをよぶ)	March 29, 2013
The idols panic when the Puchidols suddenly disappear, only to find they were simply preparing a special flower viewing party for them.

==== OVAs ====
An introductory original video animation episode was bundled with ASCII Media Works' Dengeki Maoh magazine on October 27, 2012. The Takatsuki Gold Densetsu Special!! Haruka-san Matsuri episodes are divided into two parts. World 1, World 2-1 and World 3 were bundled with the fifth manga volume on March 27, 2013, while World 2-2, World 2-3 and World 2-4 were each released with the BD/DVD volumes of the series.

No. in season	Title	Original release date
0	"Puchimas! Episode 0"; Transliteration: "Puchimasu! Dai Zero wa" (Japanese: ぷちます！だい0わ)	October 27, 2012
An announcement OVA in which the 765 Pro idols introduce their respective Puchidols.
World–1	"Wonderful Days"; Transliteration: "Wandafuru Deizu" (Japanese: わんだふるでいず)	March 27, 2013
While searching a remote island, Producer finds a shrine resembling Haruka-san and proposes a trip to investigate its artifacts.
World–1	"The Bizarre Shrine"; Transliteration: "Kimyō na Hokora" (Japanese: きみょうなほこら)	March 27, 2013
While Ritsuko's group investigate the shrine, Miki makes an accidental discovery.
World–2	"Sure is Hot"; Transliteration: "Attsuinā" (Japanese: あっついなぁ)	March 27, 2013
Iori's group trek a desert in search for Haruka-san's monument.
World–3	"Pomp and Circumstance"; Transliteration: "Ifū dōdō" (Japanese: いふうどうどう)	April 24, 2013
Chihaya's group brace fierce blizzards to find Haruka-san's monument, which Haruka gets her bottom stuck.
World–4	"An Idol's Thing"; Transliteration: "Aidoru da Mono" (Japanese: あいどるだもの)	May 29, 2013
Producer's group investigate a cave for Haruka's monument.
World–3	"Always Together"; Transliteration: "Itsumo Issho" (Japanese: いつもいっしょ)	March 27, 2013
After their exhausting experiences, the idols decide to act their vengeance upon Producer.

=== Puchimas!! Petit Petit Idolmaster (2014) ===
No. in season	Title	Original release date
Director's Cut Episode 1
1	"P-Taro, Born of P"; Transliteration: "Pī-kara Umareta Pī-Tarō" (Japanese: Pから生まれたP太郎)	April 1, 2014
In a bizarre retelling of Momotaro, Haruka-san and her faithful companions go to NEET Island to try and convince P-Taro to get a job.
2	"King of Poor Speech"; Transliteration: "Kingu obu Kuchibeta" (Japanese: きんぐおぶくちべた)	April 2, 2014
Producer attempts to call the office late at night, with only Yukipo, who can't speak, able to listen seriously.
3	"A Surprising Way to Say It"; Transliteration: "Igaina Tsutae-kata" (Japanese: 意外な伝え方)	April 3, 2014
On her birthday, Haruka is shocked to find a robot duplicate of her has taken her place in the office.
4	"The Sound of a Silent Stomach"; Transliteration: "Naranu Hara no Oto" (Japanese: 鳴らぬ腹の音)	April 4, 2014
Haruka becomes awed by Makochi's cuteness whilst trying to come up with a new radio segment.
5	"The Usual on the Radio"; Transliteration: "Radio de Itsumono" (Japanese: ラジオでいつもの)	April 7, 2014
Yukiho hosts a radio show where she receives a lot of curious questions from a certain listener.
6	"Their Relationship is Certified"; Transliteration: "Futari no Naka wa Osumitsuki" (Japanese: 2人の仲はお墨付き)	April 8, 2014
Io goes on a forehead beam rampage in the office, but Iori can't find it in her heart to punish her.
7	"The Happiness of Getting to Sing"; Transliteration: "Utaeru Shiawase" (Japanese: 歌える幸せ)	April 9, 2014
Chihaya and Chihyaa's night at the karaoke is somewhat hindered by Haruka, Takane, and their Puchidols.
8	"1-2-3!"; Transliteration: "Appuppu" (Japanese: あっぷっぷっ)	April 10, 2014
Afu, Chibiki, Koami, and Komami have a staring contest with each other whilst Chicchan notices something under the couch.
9	"They Caught a Cold!"; Transliteration: "Kaze Hiichatta!" (Japanese: 風邪ひいちゃった!)	April 11, 2014
Chicchan and PiyoPiyo are sick with a cold, receiving visits from the other Puchidols.
10	"Just Like a Hot-Water Bottle"; Transliteration: "Maru de Yutanpo" (Japanese: まるで湯たんぽ)	April 14, 2014
Io, Yayo, and Chibiki try to stay awake whilst watching over Yayoi's house.
11	"Might As Well Try to Relax Now and Then"; Transliteration: "Tamani wa Nonbiri shite Miru ka" (Japanese: たまにはのんびりしてみるか)	April 15, 2014
Ritsuko, Hibiki, Yayoi, Ami, and Mami, along with Chibiki, Haruka-san and Takanya, go to a hot spring inn.
12	"One Beat Late"; Transliteration: "Okurete Wan Tenpo" (Japanese: 遅れてワンテンポ)	April 15, 2014
After Takane and Azusa drag Chihaya and Iori with them to a hot spring trip, Chihya becomes eager to join them.
13	"The Fruits of Labor"; Transliteration: "Oshigoto no Kekka" (Japanese: おしごとのけっか)	April 16, 2014
Kotori manages another group as they go to the hot springs for a photo shoot.
14	"No More, Sadness"; Transliteration: "Kanashimi yo Nō Moa" (Japanese: 哀しみよ NO MORE)	April 16, 2014
Producer shows up at the hot spring inn just as all the idols have finished their fun.
15	"Before→After"; Transliteration: "Bifoa Afutā" (Japanese: Before→After)	April 17, 2014
When it becomes apparent that Makochi has gained a lot of weight due to Makoto spoiling her, Azusa puts her on an exercise routine.
16	"Re@Before→After"; Transliteration: "Ri atto Bifoa Afutā" (Japanese: Re@Before→After)	April 17, 2014
Yukipo revels in her newly acquired ability to talk, but finds no one listens to her regardless.
17	"Warm, Cozy Weather"; Transliteration: "Koharu Biyori de Pokka Poka" (Japanese: 小春日和でぽっかぽか)	April 18, 2014
Ritsuko works hard whilst the other idols and Puchidols take it easy.
18	"The Case of Kotori Otonashi"; Transliteration: "Otonashi Kotori no Baai" (Japanese: 音無小鳥の場合)	April 21, 2014
Kotori spends some time with the Puchidols before getting lectured by Piyo Piyo.
19	"Chicchan's Secret"; Transliteration: "Chicchan no Himitsu" (Japanese: ちっちゃんの秘密)	April 22, 2014
Chicchan has a few of her weaknesses exposed.
20	"Tricks Up Her Sleeve"; Transliteration: "Ano Te, Kono Te" (Japanese: あの手この手)	April 23, 2014
Yayoi and Yayo host a short corner due to a lack of money.
21	"Toasty Feet"; Transliteration: "Hokkori Omiashi" (Japanese: ほっこり御御足)	April 24, 2014
Iori, Takane, and Yayo try to get Io to take a footbath.
22	"Heart-Stealing Pin-Ups"; Transliteration: "Hātokyatchi Gurabia" (Japanese: はぁときゃっちぐらびあ)	April 25, 2014
Due to a stingy budget, Azusa's gravure shoot is handled by Producer, Io, Takanya, and Miura-san.
23	"Golden Hour"; Transliteration: "Gōruden Awā" (Japanese: ごーるでんあわー)	April 28, 2014
Whilst on another trip to the usual deserted island for Golden Week, Producer traps the idols and tasks the Puchidols with searching for statues of Haruka-san.
24	"Aim for the (Bronze) Haruka-san Statue!!"; Transliteration: "Haruka-san-zō (Dō) o Mezase" (Japanese: はるかさん像（銅）を目指せ)	April 29, 2014
Chibiki, Takanya, Io, and Miura-san search for the bronze Haruka-san statue, coming up against a large monster.
25	"Aim for the (Silver) Haruka-san Statue!!"; Transliteration: "Haruka-san-zō (Gin) o Mezase" (Japanese: はるかさん像（銀）を目指せ!)	April 30, 2014
Haruka-san, Makochi, Chihya, Afu, and Piyo Piyo fight their way through waves of enemies "Kung-Fu" style to reach the silver Haruka-san statue.
Director's Cut Episode 2
26	"Aim for the (Gold) Haruka-san Statue!!"; Transliteration: "Haruka-san-zō (Kin) o Mezase" (Japanese: はるかさん像（金）を目指せ!)	May 1, 2014
Chicchan, Yukipo, Yayo, Komami, and Koami use their creative knowhow to reach the golden Haruka-san statue sat atop of a giant spire.
27	"The Usual, As Usual"; Transliteration: "Yappari Itsumono" (Japanese: やっぱりいつもの)	May 2, 2014
The Producer reveals his motive for the challenges, prompting swift vengeance from the idols.
28	"Yayo-Io Imagination"; Transliteration: "YayoIo Imajineishon" (Japanese: やよいおいまじねいしょん)	May 5, 2014
Yayo and Io perform a comedy duo routine for Koami and Komami.
29	"Ultra Super Miracle Idol Birthday"; Transliteration: "Urutora Sūpā Mirakuru Aidoru no Tanjōbi" (Japanese: ウルトラスーパーミラクルアイドルの誕生日)	May 5, 2014
On her birthday, Iori finds herself dragged by Yayoi to the Arctic to see the Northern Lights.
30	"Fast Friends"; Transliteration: "Suigyo na Futari" (Japanese: 水魚な2人)	May 6, 2014
Chihya is blown away by the wind during a walk with Chihaya, but is rescued by Takanya.
31	"Piii! Pi-Pi-Pi-Pi-Pi"; Transliteration: "Pī! Pipipipipi" (Japanese: ぴーっ！ぴぴぴぴぴ)	May 6, 2014
Koami and Komami unsuccessfully try to play pranks on PiyoPiyo.
32	"Miracle Chef"; Transliteration: "Mirakuru Kokku" (Japanese: ミラクルコック)	May 7, 2014
Yukiho, Takane, Yukipo, and Yayo host a three-minute cooking show.
33	"My Name is P! In the Name of Love"; Transliteration: "Waga Na wa Pī! Ai no Omomukumama ni" (Japanese: 我が名はP!愛の趣くままに)	May 7, 2014
Producer has to taste the botched bean sprouts that Yukiho made for the show.
34	"An Ohmy Nature"; Transliteration: "Ara~ na Taishitsu" (Japanese: あら〜な体質)	May 8, 2014
Miura-san warps Yukipo and Chihya to the Antarctic, where they come up against a hungry walrus.
35	"Spirit Talkback"; Transliteration: "Tamashī no Tōkubakku" (Japanese: 魂のトークバック)	May 9, 2014
Due to a lack of sleep, Yukiho ends up talking to Miki and Azusa in spirit form.
36	"Chihyah's Serenade"; Transliteration: "Chihyā no Serenāde" (Japanese: ちひゃーのセレナーデ)	May 12, 2014
The episode follows a day in the life of Chihya.
37	"Gold-Star Smile at the Library"; Transliteration: "Toshokan de Hanamaru Egao" (Japanese: 図書館で花まる笑顔)	May 13, 2014
Azusa comes across Haruka reading a particular book in the library.
38	"Today Feels Like a Glasses Day"; Transliteration: "Kyō wa Megane no Kibun kana" (Japanese: 今日はメガネの気分かな)	May 14, 2014
Yayo tries using the office computer to look up bamboo shoot recipes.
39	"Shiny New Glasses"; Transliteration: "Shinpin Megane wa Pikka Pika" (Japanese: 新品メガネはぴっかぴか)	May 15, 2014
Makoto ends up breaking an expensive pair of glasses whilst at a glasses shop with Ritsuko.
40	"Puchi Word Chain Tournament"; Transliteration: "Puchi Shiritori Taikai" (Japanese: ぷちしりとり大会)	May 16, 2014
Hibiki gets the short end of the stick in a shiritori match against Chibiki, Chicchan, and Takanya.
41	"We Love Pranks!"; Transliteration: "Itazura Daisuki" (Japanese: イタズラ大好きっ)	May 19, 2014
Koami and Komami play various pranks on the Producer
42	"Go for the Treasure! Through the Breach"; Transliteration: "Mezase Otakara! Itten Toppa" (Japanese: 目指せお宝！1点突破)	May 20, 2014
Yayo and Io go on a quest for treasure, having Ami activate all the traps along the way.
43	"Costumes on the Radio"; Transliteration: "Rajio de Kigurumi" (Japanese: ラジオDE着ぐるみぃ)	May 21, 2014
Ami appears on Yukiho's radio show in her creature costume.
44	"Mission Puchipossible♥"; Transliteration: "Misshon Puchiposshiburu♥" (Japanese: みっしょんぷちぽっしぶる♡)	May 22, 2014
The Puchidols set up an elaborate domino trail for Ami and Mami's birthday.
45	"Where That Place Is"; Transliteration: "Ano Mise no Yukue" (Japanese: あの店の行方)	May 23, 2014
Producer and Kotori visit an oden restaurant and a bar, both run by the Puchidols.
46	"The Takane Shijou Club"; Transliteration: "Shijō Takane Kurabu" (Japanese: 四条貴音倶楽部)	May 26, 2014
Takane cooks up some of the bamboo shoots that grow on Yayo's head, resulting in a strange concoction.
47	"A Once upon a Time Tale"; Transliteration: "Mukashimukashi no Monogatari" (Japanese: 昔々のものがたり)	May 27, 2014
Takane makes up a backstory for Yayo's bamboo shoots.
48	"The Way of Takane"; Transliteration: "Takane no Arikata" (Japanese: 貴音の在り方)	May 28, 2014
Takane plays a ping pong tournament against Koami and Komami.
49	"I Don't Cry" (Japanese: I don't cry)	May 29, 2014
Hibiki tries to keep Chibiki from crying and summoning animals in the office.
50	"It's Showtime!"; Transliteration: "Ittsu! Shōtaimu" (Japanese: いっつ！しょ～たいむ)	May 30, 2014
Yukiho, Takane, and Ritsuko run the idea of a puppet show by Producer.
Director's Cut Episode 3
51	"Water Drop"; Transliteration: "Wōtā Doroppu" (Japanese: うぉ〜た〜どろっぷ)	June 2, 2014
Yayoi and Haruka do some experimentation on Haruka-san's multiplication ability.
52	"A Familiar Day"; Transliteration: "Onajimi no Ichinichi" (Japanese: お馴染みの1日)	June 3, 2014
On the usual deserted island, Haruka, Yayoi, and Iori deal with a slightly more demonic Haruka-san.
53	"Laid-Back Weight Loss"; Transliteration: "Goyururi Daietto Rōdo" (Japanese: ごゆるりだいえっとろぉど)	June 4, 2014
After getting fat again, Makochi goes on another diet regime.
54	"The Iron Fist! Emergency Scramble"; Transliteration: "Tetsu no Ken! Kinkyū Sukuranburu" (Japanese: 鉄の拳! 緊急すくらんぶる)	June 5, 2014
Producer takes Makochi to meet 'a guy with pointy hair' to help with her diet.
55	"Afu and the Snail☆"; Transliteration: "Afū to Dendenmushi☆" (Japanese: あふぅとでんでんむし☆)	June 6, 2014
Afu becomes friends with a little snail, but eventually has to take it back to its home.
56	"Watch Us Win This"; Transliteration: "Katte Miseru wa" (Japanese: 勝ってみせるわ)	June 9, 2014
Yayoi and Yayo compete against Ami and Mami in a fishing contest.
57	"Answering Service M@ster"; Transliteration: "Orushuban Masutā" (Japanese: お留守番ま@すた〜)	June 10, 2014
Each of the Puchidols take turns looking after the office phone.
58	"Precise Lip-Sync"; Transliteration: "Kuchi Paku Pittashi" (Japanese: 口パクぴったし)	June 11, 2014
Miki and Yayoi have a go at dubbing over their respective Puchidols.
59	"Holy Mackerel"; Transliteration: "Nantekotta" (Japanese: なんてこった)	June 12, 2014
Afu attempts to steal Miki's onigiri but gets caught by Hibiki.
60	"We're So Excited"; Transliteration: "Wakkuwaku na Atashi-tachi" (Japanese: わっくわくな私たち)	June 13, 2014
Miki and Yayoi find a guide and decide to go fishing for Puchidols.
61	"Madazestin Cider! Nano"; Transliteration: "Madazeschin Saidā! nano" (Japanese: マダゼスチンサイダー！ なの)	June 16, 2014
Ritsuko takes advantage of Miki's reflexes after a string of cider commercials.
62	"Outdoors on a Rainy Day"; Transliteration: "Ame no Hi no Aotodoa" (Japanese: 雨の日のあうとどあ)	June 17, 2014
Haruka-san goes outside on a rainy day, with the downpour causing a different effect than her usual multiplication.
63	"Kotori Otonashi's Entourage"; Transliteration: "Otonashi Kotori o Kakomukai" (Japanese: 音無小鳥を囲む会)	June 18, 2014
Kotori goes on an island trip with Miki, Azusa, and the Puchidols.
64	"Takanya, The Unrivaled Ace"; Transliteration: "Takanya Dekiruko Muteki na Ko" (Japanese: たかにゃデキる子ムテキな子)	June 19, 2014
Ami and Mami try to defeat Takanya in various events, but to no avail.
65	"Month-End Quest"; Transliteration: "Getsumatsu Kuesuto" (Japanese: 月末くえすと)	June 20, 2014
Miki and Afu host a low-budget corner involving onigiri.
66	"Something I Can't Say"; Transliteration: "Ie nai Kotoba" (Japanese: 言えない言葉)	June 23, 2014
Ami, Mami, and Yukiho give Ritsuko a mystery game to play on her birthday.
67	"World of Excursion"; Transliteration: "Wārudo obu Ensoku" (Japanese: わぁるど・おぶ・遠足)	June 24, 2014
Ritsuko is tasked by Producer to search across the world for the Puchidols.
68	"Producer's Secret"; Transliteration: "Purodūsā no Himitsu" (Japanese: プロデューサーの秘密)	June 25, 2014
Miki, and Iori follow Producer as he goes about his daily life, discovering his secret.
69	"Tokachi Tsukuchite"; Transliteration: "Tokachi Tsukuchite" (Japanese: とかちつくちて)	June 25, 2014
Koami and Komami fill in for the Producer when he calls in sick, helping Ritsuko with a meeting.
70	"That is the Way it Goes"; Transliteration: "Kore ga Yo no Tsune" (Japanese: これが世の常)	June 26, 2014
Ritsuko and Yayoi rehearse for a play under Producer's direction.
71	"P's Last Resort"; Transliteration: "Pī no Oku no Te" (Japanese: Pの奥の手)	June 26, 2014
The girls put on their performance with Haruka as the only spectator.
72	"Her First Adventure"; Transliteration: "Hajimete no Adobenchā" (Japanese: はじめてのあどべんちゃあ)	June 27, 2014
Yukipo goes on her first errand, helped out by Chibiki.
73	"Worrywart"; Transliteration: "Omoi Meguraso" (Japanese: おもいめぐらそ)	June 27, 2014
Ritsuko gets a little anxious about sending Yukipo on her errand.
74	"Eat and Sleep and Party"; Transliteration: "Shokutte Nete Asobe" (Japanese: 食って寝て遊べ)	June 30, 2014
The Puchidols perform a concert, with the main idols serving as backup dancers.

==== OVA ====
No. in season	Title	Original release date
0	"Winter → Kotatsu ← Spring"; Transliteration: "Fuyu Kotatsu Haru" (Japanese: ふゆ→こたつ←はる)	March 27, 2014
Takane does not want to put the kotatsu away, even though it's spring. This leads to a huge court battle led by the Producer and Takanya, on whether the kotatsu should be taken away or not.
