= Masaya Fukunishi =

Japanese voice actor

- 福西 勝也
- Born: 24 February 1995 (age 31)
- Occupation: Voice actor
- Years active: 2015–present
- Employer: Ken Production
- Notable work: Tokyo Revengers as Ken Ryūgūji; Kikai Sentai Zenkaiger as Gege; Kaiju No. 8 as Kafka Hibino

Masaya Fukunishi (Japanese: 福西 勝也, Hepburn: Fukunishi Masaya; born 24 February 1995) is a Japanese voice actor from Nara Prefecture, affiliated with Ken Production. He won the 2012 Best Anime Scenario Award at Seiyu Koshien and was part of the 3rd Seiyū Damashī 2014. He starred as Ken Ryūgūji in Tokyo Revengers and Gege in Kikai Sentai Zenkaiger, succeeding Tatsuhisa Suzuki in these roles following the latter's career hiatus. In 2023, he was cast as Kafka Hibino, the titular protagonist of Kaiju No. 8.

== Biography ==
Masaya Fukunishi, a native of Nara Prefecture, was born on 24 February 1995. While in elementary school, he decided to be a voice actor, and he as a teenager did some stage work. In 2012, he won the Best Anime Scenario Award at Seiyu Koshien. In 2014, he was selected in the Voice Actor Category at the 3rd Seiyū Damashī.

He was educated at School Duo. After voicing a reporter in the 2015 ONA Isobe Isobē Monogatari, he began voicing anime characters in 2017, including in Case Closed, Made in Abyss, Banana Fish, Cells at Work!, JoJo's Bizarre Adventure: Golden Wind, My Hero Academia, Attack on Titan, King of Prism: Shiny Seven Stars, Psycho-Pass 3, Haikyu!!, and Jujutsu Kaisen.

After Tatsuhisa Suzuki went into a career hiatus following an extramarital affair scandal, Fukunishi replaced him as the voice of Gege in Kikai Sentai Zenkaiger starting with the 25th episode in August 2021. In 2022, he later replaced Suzuki as the voice of Ken Ryūgūji in Tokyo Revengers. In August 2023, it was announced that he would star as Kafka Hibino, the titular protagonist of Kaiju No. 8. He was a guest at Anime Expo 2024.

Fukunishi speaks the Kansai dialect.

== Filmography ==
=== Animated television ===
Year	Title	Role(s)	Ref
2017	Altair: A Record of Battles	Imperial Bodyguard B	
2017	Animation x Paralympic	Announcer	
2017	Case Closed	Yuzuru Kariba	
2017	Dream Festival!	3C Student, weather forecaster	
2017	Fox Spirit Matchmaker	Shi Lanzhou	
2017	Made in Abyss	Spectator	
2017	Seven Mortal Sins		
2017	Tomica Hyper Rescue Drive Head Kidō Kyūkyū Keisatsu	Passengers	
2018	100 Sleeping Princes and the Kingdom of Dreams	City-dweller E	
2018	Baki the Grappler	Driver	
2018	Banana Fish	Pursuer	
2018	Basilisk	Tsunagi	
2018	Beatless	Bystander A	
2018	Cells at Work!	Naive T Cell 6	
2018	Devilman Crybaby	Fighter pilot	
2018	Double Decker! Doug & Kirill	Police officer B	
2018	Dragon Pilot: Hisone and Masotan	Taira	
2018	Happy Sugar Life	Customer	
2018	JoJo's Bizarre Adventure: Golden Wind	Gangster 2	
2018	Karakuri Circus	Kidnapper, high school boy	
2018	Legend of the Galactic Heroes: Die Neue These	Officer, radio operator	
2018	Mr. Tonegawa	Kansai blacksuit A	
2018	My Hero Academia	Seiba School applicant, Hassaikai member	
2018	Pop Team Epic	Shōgo	
2018	Puzzle & Dragons	Shopowner A	
2018	SSSS.Gridman	Onda	
2019	Attack on Titan	Scout	
2019	Cardfight!! Vanguard	Luck Bird	
2019	Carole & Tuesday	Ziggy	
2019	Chihayafuru	Shusaku Koishikawa	
2019	Demon Lord, Retry!	Carnival	
2019	Dororo	Samurai	
2019	Granblue Fantasy: The Animation	Shepherd	
2019	King of Prism: Shiny Seven Stars	Sakyō Amamoto	
2019	Levius	Larry McMahon	
2019	Magical Girl Spec-Ops Asuka	Sentry	
2019	Ninja Box	Raiden	
2019	Oshiri Tantei	Suiarohan	
2019	Phantasy Star Online 2	Male customer	
2019	Psycho-Pass 3	Heaven's Leap doctor	
2019	The Rising of the Shield Hero	Priest	
2020	Akudama Drive	Yakuza, police chief	
2020	Arad Senki	Clio	
2020	Dorohedoro	Undertaker	
2020	Duel Masters King	Dolgepain, General Truman, etc.	
2020	Eternity: Shin'ya no Nurekoi Channel	Yōsuke Takafuji	
2020	Haikyu!!	Heisuke Riseki, Yūto Kosaku, etc.	
2020	Jujutsu Kaisen	Honda, etc	
2020	Kaiketsu Zorori	Leon	
2020	Listeners	Local junkyard worker	
2020	Mr Love: Queen's Choice	Hacker	
2020	My Roomie Is a Dino	Pee-chan's Owner	
2020	Oda Cinnamon Nobunaga	Yoshimoto Samonji	
2021	Blue Period	Sumida	
2021	Detective Conan: Police Academy Arc	Shūzō Mononobe	
2021	Doraemon	Police officer	
2021	I-Chu	Spectator C	
2021	LBX Girls	Communicator, base resident	
2021	Megalobox 2: Nomad	Ryu	
2021	Mother of the Goddess' Dormitory	Male Maid Cafe Customer	
2021	Pokémon	Bray Zenn	
2021	Re-Main	Baseball club member	
2021	Shaman King	Classmate	
2021	SK8 the Infinity	Kazu, Gallery	
2021	The Irregular at Magic High School	Test subject	
2021	Wave!!	High school teacher	
2021	Zombie Land Saga	Radio advertisement	
2022	Dance Dance Danseur	Soccer Club Member A	
2022	The Heike Story	Noble	
2022	Tokyo Revengers	Ken Ryūgūji	
2022	Urusei Yatsura	Demon soldier	
2023	I Shall Survive Using Potions!	Carl, Kotori	
2023	Oshi no Ko	Fan	
2023	The Saint's Magic Power Is Omnipotent	Miner	
2024	Kaiju No. 8	Kafka Hibino	
2025	Teogonia	Manso	
2025	Backstabbed in a Backwater Dungeon	Garou	
2026	The Invisible Man and His Soon-to-Be Wife	Daichi Kikira	
2026	Recommendations from Iwamoto-senpai	Oni Okuaki	
2026	Magilumiere Magical Girls Inc. Season 2	Hibiki Yamimori	
2026	Overgeared	Vantner	

=== Original net animation ===
Year	Title	Role(s)	Ref
2015	Isobe Isobē Monogatari	Reporter A	
2020	Pokémon: Twilight Wings	Researcher A	
2023	Scott Pilgrim Takes Off	Wallace Wells	
2026	Steel Ball Run: JoJo's Bizarre Adventure	Mrs. Robinson	

=== Animated film ===
Year	Title	Role(s)	Ref
2016	Pretty Cure All Stars: Singing with Everyone♪ Miraculous Magic!		
2017	Blade Runner Black Out 2022	Thug B	
2018	Flavors of Youth	Supervisor	
2018	K: Seven Stories		
2018	Mobile Suit Gundam Narrative	Neo Zeon Pilot	
2018	My Hero Academia: Two Heroes		
2019	Pokémon: Mewtwo Strikes Back – Evolution	Researcher B	

=== Live-action television ===
Year	Title	Role(s)	Ref
2021	Kikai Sentai Zenkaiger	Gege	

=== Video games ===
Year	Title	Role(s)	Ref
2016	Granblue Fantasy		
2017	Star Wars Battlefront II		
2018	Attack on Titan 2		
2018	Dragalia Lost		
2018	Judgment		
2018	King of Prism: Prism Rush! Live	Sakyō Tenka	
2018	New Gundam Breaker		
2018	Quiz RPG: The World of Mystic Wiz	Popen	
2019	Ninja Box	Raiden	
2019	Pokémon Masters	Zakuro	
2020	Valorant	Phoenix	
2023	Fate/Grand Order	Nagakura Shinpachi	
2026	Fatal Fury: City of the Wolves	Ken Ryuguji	

=== Dubbing ===
- Avatar: Fire and Ash (Aonung (Filip Geljo))
- Avatar: The Way of Water (Aonung (Filip Geljo))
- The Flash (Albert Desmond (Rudy Mancuso))
- I Saw the TV Glow (Owen (Justice Smith))
- Joker: Folie à Deux (Young Inmate (Connor Storrie))
- Night Swim (Ronin (Elijah J. Roberts))
- Secret Level (young MC (Parry Shen))
- Toy Story 5
