= Angel Tales =

Japanese anime television series

- Tenshi no Shippo Chu!
- Japanese cover of season 2, Tenshi no Shippo Chu!

おとぎストーリー 天使のしっぽ (Otogi Story Tenshi no Shippo)
- Created by: Juuzou Mutsuki
- Manga
- Written by: Wonder Farm
- Original run: September 2000 – May 2001
- Anime television series
- Directed by: Kazuhiro Ochi
- Produced by: Hisanori Kunisaki; Mitsuteru Shibata; Michiko Suzuki; Shinjirou Yokoyama; Shunji Inoue
- Written by: Mari Okada
- Music by: Yoshinobu Hiraiwa
- Studio: Tokyo Kids
- Licensed by: NA: Bandai Entertainment
- Original network: WOWOW
- Original run: October 4, 2001 – December 20, 2001
- Episodes: 13
- Anime television series

Angel Tales Chu!
- Directed by: Norio Kashima
- Produced by: Kazunori Okada; Katsuaki Yamamoto
- Written by: Juuzou Mutsuki
- Music by: Yoshinobu Hiraiwa; Masumi Itō
- Studio: Tokyo Kids
- Original network: Kids Station, AT-X
- Original run: March 6, 2003
- Episodes: 11
- Video game
- Platform: PlayStation
- Released: February 27, 2003
- Other
- Saint Beast (spin-off)

Angel Tales (Japanese: おとぎストーリー 天使のしっぽ, Hepburn: Otogi Story Tenshi no Shippo) is a Japanese anime television series animated by Tōkyō Kids. The series was broadcast by the anime television network, Animax across its respective networks worldwide, including Southeast Asia, East Asia and South Asia, in English and other languages.

The series was licensed for distribution by Bandai Entertainment in North America.

== Plot ==
The main character, Gorō Mutsumi, has no luck at all, not with jobs, nor with his schooling, and especially not with women. That is until the day he meets a fortune teller who informs him that he will have a fateful encounter and adds a spell to his cell phone that allows his guardian angels to appear to him. Gorō does not believe her and walks away as he remembers all of his previous times of bad luck with women.

It is then seen that he meets three girls who are waiting for him as he is bathing. They say they are now his guardian angels, sent to earth from the spirit realm. They are the first three of his twelve beloved pets who had died due to Gorō's poor luck, returning to him on earth. He does not find out they are his pets at first.

More of his former pets return to him as guardian angels, and each desires to be his favorite. They have fears from their past lives that they must overcome, and they must learn to live with each other; it is the only way they can help Gorō turn his life around.

These girls however are not the only ones on earth; because of Gorō's own past life, there are strange people out there trying to put a stop to these girls turning his luck around. For their own reasons, these people fear Gorō and desire him out of the way. As the story progresses the girls learn they must protect Gorō not only from his own bad luck but from these other people, without fully understanding either who they are or why they want to harm their beloved master.

== Characters ==
Gorō Mutsumi (睦 悟郎, Mutsumi Gorō)
Voiced by: Hisayoshi Suganuma (Japanese); Ted Sroka (English)
Gorō is the protagonist of the anime, and until the second season he is still the protagonist, he works as if he is working as the sage. In a past life, Gorō was the sage named Seijya, "not human nor animal two supreme beings that are tied together", who stole the divine powers of the Four Saint Beasts; the Fang of the Blue Dragon (sword), the Wings of the Red Phoenix (wings), the Shell of the Black Turtle (shield) and the Armour of the White Tiger (skin) and sealed the Beasts away for centuries in order to prevent the impending destruction of the humans and, in his next life, to create a new world where humans and animals can live as equals with the Saint Beasts help.
In Season 2 Gorō Mutsumi became veterinarian and takes care of all animals confined. He then encountered failure in his job, but still, he continued to work for himself and his angels.

=== Guardian angels ===
The titular guardian angels are reincarnations of Gorō's beloved childhood pets who are modeled after girls whom Gorō had been friends with as a child. Each of the pets died in an unfortunate accident, but was reincarnated as one of Gorō's guardian angels. All of the girls love Gorō, are very possessive of him and are willing to protect him even at the cost their own lives. Each of the girls has a phobia related to the cause of her death from when she was a pet. Over the course of the story, the girls have to overcome their fears in order to help Gorō. They all acknowledge each other as family, referring to one another as sisters.

Ran (ラン) (goldfish)
Voiced by: Rie Tanaka (Japanese); Michelle Ruff (English)

Ran is a calm and caring girl who is the reincarnation of Gorō's pet goldfish. Ran is a Senior rank guardian angel and one of the first three angels to appear in the series. She has the most screen time of any girl in the anime and her image was used to advertise the show more than any of the other angels. The series even opens with her death as a goldfish: while Gorō was on vacation, a power failure stopped the circulation pump in Ran's tank and she died due to a lack of oxygen. Due to this, Ran has aquaphobia: a fear of water. She is deeply in love with Gorō. Tsubasa also notes and comments upon the fact that Ran's feelings surpass her own, and vows to bring Ran and Gorō together. Ran's name means orchid and her hairstyle represents a fish's fins. Her color image is pink.

Tsubasa (ツバサ) (parakeet)
Voiced by: Sakura Nogawa (Japanese); Zarah Little (English)

Tsubasa is one of the first three angels to appear to Gorō and is of Intermediate rank. She was a parakeet in her past life, her hairstyle represents a parakeet's wings and her name means wing. As a bird, she had a broken wing and was rescued by Gorō, who took care of her. She tried to show Gorō her appreciation for his attention by showing him her beauty in flight, but her wing hadn't healed fully and she fell from the house's window and died. As a result, Tsubasa has acrophobia: a fear of heights. Tsubasa has deep feelings for Gorō, and she is angry at Rei, the Red Phoenix (Suzaku), who is in love with her but hurt her beloved master. Her color image is red.

In Season 2, Tsubasa is promoted to Senior rank.

Kurumi (クルミ) (hamster)
Voiced by: Mayako Nigo (Japanese); Sandy Fox (English)

Kurumi is one of the first three angels that appeared in the series and is of Intermediate rank. She is named after and looks identical to Goro's childhood crush. In her past life she was a hamster that escaped from her cage and got lost, unable to find her way home and she eventually died of starvation. She now has Ypositismosphobia: a fear of hunger, and is always snacking. Her hairstyle, bao and mouth shape represent a hamster's ears and mouth. Her name means walnut and her color image is yellow. She tends to end her sentences with "Nano".

Yuki (ユキ) (snake)
Voiced by: Kyoko Hikami (Japanese); Karen Strassman (English)

Yuki is a Senior rank guardian angel and the eldest of Goro's guardian angels. She acts, and is seen, as a mother to the younger angels and Mika insultingly refers to her as "mother. She usually remains quiet but will give useful advice when asked. Yuki was a white snake in her past life. Her name means snow, alluding to the color of her skin and scales as a snake. Yuki's color image is blue. In her past life Yuki burned to death, and she has pyrophobia: the fear of fire. She is the bride of Gou the Azure Dragon (Seiryu). In season 2, Yuki becomes a goddess in place of the previous goddess, who broke the rules. She watches over the world especially animals and Gorō.

Mika (ミカ) (rabbit)
Voiced by: Yukana (Japanese); Wendee Lee (English)

Mika is a Senior rank guardian angel. She was a rabbit in her past life and her hairstyle represents a rabbit's ears. She is extroverted and hyperactive and her over-the-top antics usually result in her being yelled at by Ayumi and Akane (rabbits have a history of rivalry with turtles and foxes). When she was a rabbit, she died of loneliness. Her attention seeking may be due to autophobia: a fear of loneliness. Her name means new moon, alluding to myth of the rabbit of the moon. Her color image is orange.

Unlike most of the other angels, she is very clearly romantically attracted to Gorō.

Ayumi (アユミ) (turtle)
Voiced by: Ayako Kawasumi (Japanese); Hunter MacKenzie Austin (English)

Ayumi is a Senior rank guardian angel. She was a turtle in her past life and is slow to make decisions because she is always thinking ahead. Ayumi always wears a green beret-like hat that symbolizes her turtle shell in her past life. Ayumi often scolds Mika and argues with her most of the time. Her name means walk and her color image is black. As a turtle, Ayumi was crushed to death, so she is now claustrophobic (afraid of tight spaces) and achluophobic (afraid of the dark). Ayumi is the bride of Shin, the Black Turtle (Genbu). Out of the four guardian angels who were abducted by the four Saint Beasts, she reciprocates her abductor's feelings the most.

Akane (アカネ) (fox)
Voiced by: Saeko Chiba (Japanese); Tricia Dickson (English)

Akane is an Intermediate rank guardian angel. She was a fox in her past life and her pony tail and hair ribbon-ties represent a fox's tail and ears. Akane is an introverted and misunderstood girl: she appears to be cold but is actually very friendly and warms to Midori more than the other angels. She is mature for her age but is very afraid of dogs, even Nana. This is because in her past life she was a fox who died after dogs attacked her and her family and she was shot by a hunter. She is, therefore, afraid of dogs (cynophobia), loud noises (ligryophobia) and bright lights (selaphobia). Her color image is purple and her name means red dye. She reveals that she is in love with Gorō.

Midori (ミドリ) (tanuki or raccoon dog)
Voiced by: Akiko Kobayashi (Japanese); Jessica D. Stone (English)

Midori is an Intermediate rank guardian angel who is often seen with Akane working in an udon restaurant, which is a reference to Japanese mythology. In her past life as a raccoon dog, and her hairstyle represents a raccoon's mask and tail. Midori died of food poisoning and she is now a very picky eater (toxicophobia is a fear of poisoning). She and Akane have the ability to shapeshift - a power that tanuki and kitsune have been known to possess in Japanese mythology. Her name means green and that is her color image.

Tamami (タマミ) (cat)
Voiced by: Chiaki Osawa (Japanese); Carrie Daniels (English)

Tamami is an Intermediate rank guardian angel. She was a cat in her past life and her hairstyle represents a cat's ears. Tamami has a very cat-like personality: she is very hyperactive and is able to scale walls with ease. She has a tendency to take naps in warm, sunny places. Her name means beautiful gem and her color image is white. In her past life, Tamami was run over by a car and she now has motorphobia: a fear of cars or automobiles. Tamami is the bride of Gai, the White Tiger (Byakko), who is very protective of her but says that she's too young.

In the second season, Tamami is promoted to Senior rank due to her achievements in the human world.

Momo (モモ) (monkey)
Voiced by: Aya Hirano (Japanese); Kay Jensen (English)

Momo is a Junior rank guardian angel. She was a monkey in her past life and her hairstyle represents a monkey's tail. Strangely, her monkey form greatly resembles a tarsier. Her name means peach and her color image is brown. Momo is shy and unable to express what is on her mind. However, she gradually develops courage and self-confidence. Nana and Lulu note that Momo has a crush on a boy from the neighborhood, named Daisuke, who too had a crush on her. As a monkey, Momo was very curious and adventurous which led to her losing her tail and dying by electrocution. She now has electraphobia: a fear of electricity and technophobia: a fear of technology, electronics or anything powered by electricity.

In season 2, she is promoted to Intermediate rank and she develops feelings for Gorō.

Nana (ナナ) (dog)
Voiced by: Shizuka Hasegawa (Japanese); Lauren Bendik (English)

Nana is a Junior rank guardian angel. She was a dog in her past life and her hairstyle represents a dog's ears. Nana has a tomboyish personality and is hyperactive, like a puppy. She enjoys walks but tends to get lost. When Nana was a dog, she died in pain and is afraid of feeling pain (agliophobia). Her name means grace and her color image is light blue.

Lulu (ルル) (frog)
Voiced by: Mei Shimizu (Japanese); Rachel Hirschfeld (English)

Lulu is a Junior rank guardian angel and the youngest of the group. She was a frog in her past life and her hairstyle and hair ornaments represent a frog's skin and eyes. Lulu is a rather spoiled girl who only listens to and obeys Gorō, much to Gou and Gai's displeasure and frustration. As a frog, Lulu froze to death, so she is afraid of the cold (cryophobia) and cold objects (frigophobia). Her name means pearl and her color image is yellow-green.

=== Four Saint Beasts ===
As early as Tamami's entrance (in the second episode), these four men who are reincarnations of the Four Sacred Beasts (Seiryu, Suzaku, Byakko and Genbu) make numerous attempts to eliminate Gorō's life. Midway into the story, Yuki, Tsubasa, Tamami and Ayumi are kidnapped by them to be their respective "brides". It is later revealed that the reason for this was revenge for Gorō's past life taking their special powers. However, it was also revealed after the confrontation between Gorō and the eight remaining angels and the four gods that Gorō's past life was in fact Seijya "Not human nor animal two supreme beings that are tied together" and the act of taking these powers was only to prevent any possible conflict between humans and animals. Because of finally understanding the true reason for the loss of their powers, the four kidnapped angels are returned to normal and the four move in to assume the task of protecting Gorō. Unfortunately, they aren't as efficient as the angels so they elect to leave Gorō again with the angels to reclaim their powers on their own, knowing that Gorō is in good hands with the angels. They all wear qipao-like attire colored in their respective colors. They make no appearance in the second season, but are mentioned.

In 2003, a spin-off series named Saint Beast premiered. Other than the Four Saint Beasts and Yuki as the Goddess as well as Ayumi, Tamami, Tsubasa and Gorō Mutsumi reincarnated as the sage, there is no real relationship to Angel Tales.

Gou
Voiced by: Toshiyuki Morikawa (Japanese); Justin Gross (English)
The reincarnation of Seiryu the Azure Dragon of the East. As such, he is the group's leader and the most powerful. Unlike the other three gods, he is heterochromatic (his right eye is blue while his left is red). He is the last to appear (at the end of episode 8) and his reappearance frightens even the goddess, who accidentally drops her staff in fear. He takes Yuki as his bride, since Oriental dragons, which Seiryu is commonly depicted as, are serpentine. He is clearly in love with Yuki, as she is with him.

Sacred Power: Fang(Sword) of the Blue Dragon. Lightning Blast

Rei
Voiced by: Kouki Miyata (Japanese); Patrick Seitz (English)
The reincarnation of Suzaku the Vermilion Bird of the South. He is the most feminine in appearance, behavior (though not as extreme enough to be considered homosexual, which he himself states), and (only in the Japanese version) voice, thus the series' bishōnen. He first appears to hypnotize Gorō while on a date with Tsubasa to a theme park to ride the ferris wheel, knowing full well of Tsubasa's fear of heights. He later takes Tsubasa as his bride, since both are birds. When she later regains control of her will, she slaps Rei, without a care of who he was, to prove a point of how much grief and trouble they caused. Later on, even he notes that Tsubasa has feelings for him, but as he was leaving, he was contented with the result. Unlike his Saint Beast counterpart, his hair covers his left eye, hence the bishōnen appearance.

Sacred Power: Wings of the Red Phoenix. Talon Strike. Scorched Flame

Gai
Voiced by: Hiroyuki Yoshino (Japanese); Josh Phillips (English)
The reincarnation of Byakko the White Tiger of the West. He is the most impulsive and possibly the younger brother of the group and is prone to wild fits. He is the first to appear, attempting to run over Gorō with a truck but is saved by Tamami, whom he later takes as his bride, both being cats. Though he complained about Tamami's age at first, he really is fond of her, and always tries to protect her.

Sacred Power: Armour of the White Tiger. Tiger Claw

Shin
Voiced by: Takahiro Sakurai (Japanese); Crispin Freeman (English)
The reincarnation of Genbu the Black Tortoise of the North. He is the sensible, calm and brooding member of the group and its second-in-command, leading it in Gou's absence. He bypassed Ayumi while she was doing groceries. He later saw her again when the three tricked Gorō into working at an abandoned site under the pretense of a part-time job but to use him as a sacrifice to revive Gou. It was here that he fell in love with her enough to save her from the collapsing building. He later made her his bride, both being closely related animals (shelled reptiles). However, when the four joined Gorō's side, Ayumi unconsciously hints that the relationship may not be one sided even before her abduction, the same goes for Yuki and Gou and perhaps, Tamami and Gai. His Saint Beast counterpart constantly wears glasses and has shoulder-length blue-green hair, unlike the original Shin, who only wore his glasses in disguise, as well as having shorter black hair.

Sacred Power: Shield of the Black Turtle. Genbu Shell Attack.

== Episode list ==
1. An Unforgettable Bond "Wasurerarenai Kizuna"
2. I'm Not Afraid Of My Trauma! "Watashi Wa Watashi No Torauma O Osorete Imasen!"
3. Let Me Help You, Master! "Otetsudai Sa Kete Kudasai Masuta!
4. I Can't Bear A Goodbye! "Sayonara Wa Dekimasen!"
5. Please Remember, Master! "Masuta, O Oboete Kudasai!"
5.5 Master & Our House "Masuta To Watashitachi No Ie"
6. The Master Of The Soba Restaurant "Soba-Ya No Shujin"
7. The Elementary School For Small Angels "Chisana Tenshin No Tame No Shoggako"
8. A Dangerous Part-Time Job? "Kiten-Na Arubaito"
9. Feelings That Have Started To Sprout "Mebuki Hajimeta Kimochi"
10. I Will Protect You Even If It Means Sacrificing Myself! "Jibun O Gisei Ni Suru To Iu Imi Demo Anata O Mamorimasu!"
11. Separation Always Occurs Suddenly! "Bunri Wa Tsunenai Totsuzen Okoru"
12. Master, We Love You! "Masuta, Aishiteruyo!"
13. The Unforgettable Someone "Wasurerarenai Dareka"

== Media ==
=== Music ===
Opening theme

- Tenshi no Shippo by P.E.T.S (Rie Tanaka, Sakura Nogawa, Mayako Nigo, Kyōko Hikami, Yukana)

Ending theme

- One Drop by Sakura Nogawa

Insert song

- Ai no Hoshi by Masumi Itō

=== Game ===
There is also a PlayStation game by the same name published by Bandai Games.
