= Gathering (animation studio) =

Japanese animation studio

Gathering Co., Ltd.
- Native name: ギャザリング株式会社
- Romanized name: Gathering kabushiki gaisha
- Type: Kabushiki gaisha
- Industry: Animation studio
- Founded: September 2009; 17 years ago (studio); September 1, 2015; 11 years ago (company)
- Defunct: February 2022; 4 years ago
- Fate: Absorbed into Gathering Holdings
- Headquarters: Nishi-Shinbashi, Minato, Tokyo, Japan
- Key people: Kazuhiro Toda
- Total equity: ¥ 10,000,000
- Number of employees: 10
- Website: gathering.co.jp

Gathering Co., Ltd. (Japanese: ギャザリング株式会社, Hepburn: gyazaringu kabushiki gaisha) was a Japanese animation studio based in Chiyoda, Tokyo.

== History ==
The studio was founded by Kazuhiro Toda, board member of DLE in September 2009. The studio received investment from Asahi Production in April 2012. In December 2012, the headquarter of the studio was moved to Chiyoda and renamed to Gathering Holdings on September 1, 2015, with the planning and production division being transferred to a wholly-owned subsidiary.

== Works ==
=== Television series ===
Title	Director(s)	First run start date	First run end date	Eps	Note(s)	Ref(s)
Tono to Issho: 1-Funkan Gekijō	Mankyū	July 6, 2010	September 21, 2010	12	Based on a manga written by Ohba-Kai.	
Tono to Issho: Gantai no Yabō	Mankyū	April 5, 2011	June 21, 2011	12	Sequel to Tono to Issho: 1-Funkan Gekijō.	
Bananya	Kyō Yatate	July 4, 2016	September 26, 2016	12	Original work. Co-produced with TMS Entertainment.	
The Idolmaster Cinderella Girls Theater	Mankyū	April 4, 2017	June 27, 2017	13	Spin-off to The Idolmaster Cinderella Girls.	
The Idolmaster Cinderella Girls Theater Season 2	Mankyū	October 3, 2017	December 26, 2017	13	Second season of The Idolmaster Cinderella Girls Theater.	
The Idolmaster Cinderella Girls Theater Season 3	Mankyū	July 3, 2018	September 25, 2018	13	Third season of The Idolmaster Cinderella Girls Theater.	
Okoshiyasu, Chitose-chan	Kyō Yatate	October 5, 2018	March 22, 2019	24	Based on a manga written by Yukiko Natsume.	
The Idolmaster Cinderella Girls Theater Season 4	Mankyū	April 2, 2019	June 25, 2019	13	Final season of The Idolmaster Cinderella Girls Theater.	
Bananya and the Curious Bunch	Kyō Yatate	October 1, 2019	December 24, 2019	13	Sequel to Bananya. Co-produced with TMS Entertainment.	

=== ONAs ===
Title	Director(s)	First run start date	First run end date	Eps	Note(s)	Ref(s)
Puchimas! Petit Idolmaster	Mankyū	January 1, 2013	March 29, 2013	64	Based on a manga written by Akane.	
Isobe Isobee Monogatari ~Ukiyo wa Tsurai yo~	Mankyū	December 19, 2013	December 19, 2013	4	Based on a manga written by Ryō Nakama.	
Puchimas!! Petit Petit Idolmaster	Mankyū	April 1, 2014	June 30, 2014	74	Sequel to Puchimas! Petit Idolmaster.	
Isobe Isobee Monogatari ~Ukiyo wa Tsurai yo~ Season 2	Mankyū	March 26, 2017	March 26, 2017	1	Sequel to Isobe Isobee Monogatari ~Ukiyo wa Tsurai yo~.	

=== OVAs ===
Title	Director(s)	First run start date	First run end date	Note(s)	Ref(s)
Puchimas! Petit Idolmaster	Mankyū	October 27, 2012	October 27, 2012	Original video animation episode bundled with Dengeki Maoh.	
Takatsuki Gold Densetsu Special!! Harukasan Matsuri	Mankyū	March 27, 2013	March 29, 2013	Original video animation episode bundled with the limited edition of the fifth manga volume and each BD/DVD volume of the series.	

=== Films ===
Title	Director(s)	Release Date	Runtime	Note(s)	Ref(s)
A Polar Bear in Love	Kazuya Ichikawa	March 24, 2017	1 minute	Based on a manga written by Koromo.	
