= High School Family =

Japanese manga series by Ryo Nakama

- High School Family: Kokosei Kazoku
- Cover of the first volume

高校生家族 (Kōkōsei Kazoku)
- Genre: Comedy
- Manga
- Written by: Ryo Nakama
- Published by: Shueisha
- English publisher: NA: Viz Media
- Imprint: Jump Comics
- Magazine: Weekly Shōnen Jump
- Original run: September 7, 2020 – February 20, 2023
- Volumes: 11
- Live-action film
- Directed by: Toichiro Ruto
- Written by: Makoto Ueda
- Released: January 8, 2027
- icon

High School Family: Kokosei Kazoku (Japanese: 高校生家族, Hepburn: Kōkōsei Kazoku) is a Japanese manga series written and illustrated by Ryo Nakama. It was serialized in Shueisha's Weekly Shōnen Jump from September 2020 to February 2023, with its chapters collected in eleven tankōbon volumes. A live-action film adaptation is set to premiere in January 2027.

== Plot ==
After graduating from middle school, Kotaro Ietani is accepted to Metropolitan Happee High School. On the morning of the entrance ceremony, Kotaro's heart swells with anticipation for high school life. Suddenly, his father, Ichiro—a middle school graduate who had long yearned for high school life—tells him that he will be attending the same high school. Kotaro also learns that his mother, Shizuka; his elementary school–aged sister, Haruka; and even their pet, Gomez, will all be attending the same high school. Thus, swept up by the members of the Ietani family, Kotaro's high school life begins.

== Characters ==
Kotaro Ietani (家谷 光太郎, Ietani Kotarō)
Portrayed by: Jun Saitō
Ichiro Ietani (家谷 一郎, Ietani Ichirō)
Portrayed by: Shingo Katori
Shizuka Ietani (家谷 静香, Ietani Shizuka)
Portrayed by: Riisa Naka
Haruka Ietani (家谷 春香, Ietani Haruka)
Portrayed by: Yuno Nagao

== Media ==
=== Manga ===
Written and illustrated by Ryo Nakama, High School Family: Kokosei Kazoku was serialized in Shueisha's shōnen manga magazine Weekly Shōnen Jump from September 7, 2020, to February 20, 2023. Shueisha collected its chapters in eleven tankōbon volumes, released from February 4, 2021, to July 4, 2023.

The manga is being simultaneously published in English by Viz Media on its Shonen Jump service and by Shueisha's Manga Plus online platform. Viz Media started publishing the volumes in digital format on April 26, 2022.

==== Volumes ====
| No. | Original release date | Original ISBN | English release date | English ISBN |
|---|---|---|---|---|
| 1 | February 4, 2021 | 978-4-08-882616-5 | April 26, 2022 | 978-1-9747-2361-4 |
| 2 | June 4, 2021 | 978-4-08-882684-4 | July 26, 2022 | 978-1-9747-3355-2 |
| 3 | September 3, 2021 | 978-4-08-882762-9 | October 25, 2022 | 978-1-9747-3683-6 |
| 4 | November 4, 2021 | 978-4-08-882869-5 | January 24, 2023 | 978-1-9747-3740-6 |
| 5 | February 4, 2022 | 978-4-08-883012-4 | April 25, 2023 | 978-1-9747-3821-2 |
| 6 | June 3, 2022 | 978-4-08-883142-8 | July 25, 2023 | 978-1-9747-4004-8 |
| 7 | September 2, 2022 | 978-4-08-883226-5 | October 24, 2023 | 978-1-9747-4209-7 |
| 8 | January 4, 2023 | 978-4-08-883424-5 | January 23, 2024 | 978-1-9747-4447-3 |
| 9 | March 3, 2023 | 978-4-08-883435-1 | April 23, 2024 | 978-1-9747-4541-8 |
| 10 | June 2, 2023 | 978-4-08-883560-0 | July 23, 2024 | 978-1-9747-4829-7 |
| 11 | July 4, 2023 | 978-4-08-883566-2 | November 26, 2024 | 978-1-9747-5104-4 |

=== Live-action film ===
In February 2026, it was announced that the manga will receive a live-action film adaptation. It is directed by Toichiro Ruto, from a screenplay written by Makoto Ueda. It will be distributed by Toei. It was originally scheduled to premiere in Q4 2026; however, it was later announced that it set to premiere on January 8, 2027. The film's theme song is "Kore mo Seishun da" (これも青春だ; lit. 'This, Too, Is Part of Being Young'), performed by Yuzu.

== Reception ==
The series was nominated for the 2022 Next Manga Award in the print manga category and placed ninth out of 50 nominees.

== See also ==
- Isobe Isobē Monogatari, another manga series by the same author
