= Bananya =

Japanese anime television series

ばなにゃ
- Genre: Anime, Comedy, Family
- Created by: Q-LiA
- Anime television series
- Directed by: Kyō Yatate
- Produced by: Kyō Yatate
- Written by: Kyō Yatate
- Studio: Gathering
- Licensed by: Crunchyroll: SA/SEA: Medialink
- Original network: TV Saitama, Sun TV
- Original run: July 4, 2016 – September 26, 2016
- Episodes: 13
- Anime television series

Bananya and the Curious Bunch
- Directed by: Kyō Yatate
- Written by: Masahiro Takata
- Music by: Akiyuki Tateyama
- Studio: Gathering; TMS Entertainment
- Licensed by: Crunchyroll: SA/SEA: Medialink
- Original network: TV Tokyo
- Original run: October 1, 2019 – December 24, 2019
- Episodes: 13
- Anime television series

Bananya Around The World
- Directed by: Kyō Yatate
- Produced by: Kiyoaki Terashima; Kanako Shimizu
- Written by: Masahiro Takata
- Music by: Akiyuki Tateyama
- Studio: TMS Entertainment; Lesprit
- Licensed by: Crunchyroll: SA/SEA: Medialink
- Original run: October 21, 2024 – December 16, 2024
- Episodes: 13

Bananya (ばなにゃ) is an original Japanese anime television series produced by animation studio Gathering. It aired from July 4, 2016, to September 26, 2016. The series follows a white cat who lives inside a banana. It was streamed outside of Japan by Crunchyroll. A second season aired from October 1, 2019, to December 24, 2019. A third season called "Bananya Around The World" aired from Oct 21, 2024 to Dec 16, 2024.

== Plot ==
Discovering a new species of tiny cats living inside of bananas, the anime revolves around their lives. Bananya's lifelong dream is to bathe in chocolate with all of his banana cat friends. Until then, they are trying to live their lives as best as they can in a normal household.

== Characters ==
Narrator
Voiced by: Yoshikazu Ebisu (Bananya); Kana Yūki (Bananya and the Curious Bunch) (Japanese); Mike Toole (Bananya); Lindsay Sheppard (Bananya and the Curious Bunch) (English)
Bananya (ばなにゃ)
Voiced by: Yuki Kaji
Tabby Bananya (とらばなにゃ, Tora Bananya)
Voiced by: Ayumu Murase
Bananyako (ばなにゃ子)
Voiced by: Ayumu Murase
Black Bananya (くろばなにゃ, Kuro Bananya)
Voiced by: Yuki Kaji
Long-haired Bananya (けながばなにゃ, Kenaga Bananya)
Voiced by: Yuki Kaji
Mackerel Bananya (さばとらばなにゃ, Sabatora Bananya)
Voiced by: Ayumu Murase
Daddy Bananya (おやじばなにゃ, Oyaji Bananya)
Voiced by: Yuki Kaji
Baby Bananya (ベビーばなにゃ, Bebī Bananya)
Voiced by: Ayumu Murase
Calico Bananya (みけばなにゃ, Mike Bananya)
Voiced by: Yuki Kaji
Bananya Bunch (たばなにゃたち, Tabananyatachi)
Voiced by: Ayumu Murase
The Mice (ねずみ, Nezumi)
Voiced by: Ayumu Murase

== Production ==
Production of a Bananya television anime was originally announced by stationery company Q-Lia, creator of Shizuku-chan, with a crowdfunding campaign to aid production of the series. Bananya began airing from July 4, 2016, and ended on September 26, 2016. Kyō Yatate directed the series at studio Gathering with production cooperation by TMS Entertainment. Each episode is three minutes, and the ending theme is "Lucky Holiday", performed by AXELL featuring Yūki Kaji.

Outside of Asia, Crunchyroll licensed the first series internationally, with home video distribution handled by Discotek Media in North America, who also produced an English dub for the series. The series is available on Kabillion. Medialink licensed the series in South and Southeast Asia.

On August 7, 2019, the official website revealed that a second anime series titled Bananya and the Curious Bunch (ばなにゃ ふしぎななかまたち, Bananya Fushigi na Nakamatachi; lit. Bananya: Wondrous Friends) was in production, and aired from October 1, 2019, to December 24, 2019. Outside of Asia, Crunchyroll licensed the second anime series for distribution internationally with home video distribution handled by Discotek Media in North America, who also produced an English dub for the series. In South and Southeast Asia, Medialink also licensed the second series.

=== Episode list ===
==== Bananya ====
No.	Title (Note: All English titles are taken from Crunchyroll)	Original release date
1	"The Kitty Who Lived in a Banana" "Bananya, Nya" (Japanese: ばなにゃ、にゃ)	July 4, 2016
2	"Bananya and Friends, Nya" "Bananya, Nakamatachi Nya" (Japanese: ばなにゃ、なかまたちにゃ)	July 11, 2016
3	"Bananya Watches TV, Nya" "Bananya, Terebi Nya" (Japanese: ばなにゃ、てれびにゃ)	July 18, 2016
4	"Bananya and the Mouse, Nya" "Bananya, Nezumi Nya" (Japanese: ばなにゃ、ねずみにゃ)	July 25, 2016
5	"Bananya and the Refrigerator, Nya" "Bananya, Reizouko Nya" (Japanese: ばなにゃ、れいぞうこにゃ)	August 1, 2016
6	"Bananya Goes Out, Nya" "Bananya, Odekake Nya" (Japanese: ばなにゃ、おでかけにゃ)	August 8, 2016
7	"Bananya in the Middle of the Night, Nya" "Bananya, Mayonaka Nya" (Japanese: ばなにゃ、まよなかにゃ)	August 15, 2016
8	"Bananya and the Stray Cat, Nya" "Bananya, Noraneko Nya" (Japanese: ばなにゃ、のらねこにゃ)	August 22, 2016
9	"Bananya in the Bathroom, Nya" "Bananya, Basurūmu Nya" (Japanese: ばなにゃ、ばするーむにゃ)	August 29, 2016
10	"Bananya and the Balloon, Nya" "Bananya, Fūsen Nya" (Japanese: ばなにゃ、ふうせんにゃ)	September 5, 2016
11	"Bananya Takes a Walk, Nya" "Bananya, Osanpo Nya" (Japanese: ばなにゃ、おさんぽにゃ)	September 12, 2016
12	"Bananya's Afternoon Nap, Nya" "Bananya, Ohirune Nya" (Japanese: ばなにゃ、おひるねにゃ)	September 19, 2016
13	"Bananya and the Birthday, Nya" "Bananya, Otanjōbi Nya" (Japanese: ばなにゃ、おたんじょうびにゃ)	September 26, 2016

==== Bananya and the Curious Bunch ====
No.	Title	Original release date
1	"Bananya and His Friends, Nya" "Bananya to Nakama-tachi Nya" (Japanese: ばなにゃとなかまたち にゃ)	October 1, 2019
2	"Bananya and the Meowteors, Nya" "Bananya to Nyagareboshi Nya" (Japanese: ばなにゃとにゃがれぼし にゃ)	October 8, 2019
3	"Bananya and the Droopy-eared Bananya, Nya" "Bananya to Taremimi Bananya Nya" (Japanese: ばなにゃとたれみみばなに にゃ)	October 15, 2019
4	"Bananya and Ninja Training, Nya" "Bananya to Ninja Shugyou Nya" (Japanese: ばなにゃにんじゃしゅうぎょう にゃ)	October 22, 2019
5	"Bananya and the Mysterious Mansion, Nya" "Bananya to Nazo no Yakata Nya" (Japanese: ばなにゃとなぞのやかた にゃ)	October 29, 2019
6	"Bananya and the Robot Cat, Nya" "Bananya to Robotto Nyanko Nya" (Japanese: ばなにゃとロボットにゃんこ にゃ)	November 5, 2019
7	"Bananya and Music, Nya" "Bananya to Ongaku Nya" (Japanese: ばなにゃとおんがく にゃ)	November 12, 2019
8	"Bananya and Chatting, Nya" "Bananya to Oshaberi Nya" (Japanese: ばなにゃとおしゃべり にゃ)	November 19, 2019
9	"Bananya and the Festival, Nya" "Bananya to Omatsuri Nya" (Japanese: ばなにゃとおまつり にゃ)	November 26, 2019
10	"Bananya and the Round Thing of Dreams, Nya" "Bananya to Akogare no Manmaru Nya" (Japanese: ばなにゃとあこがれのまんまる にゃ)	December 3, 2019
11	"Bananya and the Lost Item, Nya" "Bananya to Otoshi Mono Nya" (Japanese: ばなにゃとおとしもの にゃ)	December 10, 2019
12	"Bananya and the Legendary Bananya, Nya" "Bananya to Densetsu no Bananya Nya" (Japanese: ばなにゃとでんせつのばなにゃ にゃ)	December 17, 2019
13	"Bananya and the Big Round World, Nya" "Bananya to Manmaru no Sekai Nya" (Japanese: ばなにゃとまんまるのせかい にゃ)	December 24, 2019
