= Okoshiyasu, Chitose-chan =

Japanese manga series

- Cover of Okoshiyasu, Chitose-chan volume 1 by Kodansha

おこしやす、ちとせちゃん
- Genre: Iyashikei
- Manga
- Written by: Yukiko Natsume
- Published by: Kodansha
- Magazine: Be Love
- Original run: April 30, 2016 – April 1, 2024
- Volumes: 8
- Anime television series
- Directed by: Kyō Yatate
- Music by: Koguma
- Studio: Gathering
- Original network: Tokyo MX, KBS Kyoto
- Original run: October 5, 2018 – March 22, 2019
- Episodes: 24

Okoshiyasu, Chitose-chan (おこしやす、ちとせちゃん) is a Japanese manga series by Yukiko Natsume. It has been serialized in Kodansha's josei manga magazine Be Love from April 2016 to April 2024 and was collected in eight tankōbon volumes. An anime television series adaptation by Gathering premiered from October 5, 2018, to March 22, 2019.

== Characters ==
Chitose-chan (ちとせちゃん)

== Media ==
=== Manga ===
No.	Release date	ISBN
1	November 11, 2016	978-4-06-393075-7
2	July 13, 2017	978-4-06-337865-8
3	March 13, 2018	978-4-06-511148-2
4	February 13, 2019	978-4-06-514789-4
5	March 13, 2020	978-4-06-518656-5
6	June 11, 2021	978-4-06-523764-9
7	October 13, 2022	978-4-06-529544-1
8	June 13, 2024	978-4-06-535563-3
