= Tono to Issho =

Japanese manga and anime series

- Cover of the first manga volume

殿といっしょ
- Genre: Comedy, historical
- Manga
- Written by: Ohba-Kai
- Published by: Media Factory
- Magazine: Comic Flapper
- Original run: 2006 – 2017
- Volumes: 8
- Anime television series

Tono to Issho: 1-Funkan Gekijō
- Directed by: Mankyū
- Written by: Mankyū
- Studio: Gathering
- Original network: ytv, Animax
- Original run: July 6, 2010 – September 21, 2010
- Episodes: 12
- Anime television series

Tono to Issho: Gantai no Yabō
- Directed by: Mankyū
- Written by: Mankyū
- Music by: Keiichi Sugiyama
- Studio: Gathering
- Original network: ytv, Tokyo MX, CTV, Animax
- Original run: April 5, 2011 – June 21, 2011
- Episodes: 12

Tono to Issho (Japanese: 殿といっしょ; lit. "My Lord and Me") is a Japanese 4-panel gag manga written and illustrated by Ohba-Kai. Tono to Issho parodies several historical figures from Japan's Sengoku period (Warring States Era). Tono to Issho was adapted into two anime television series and two original video animations.

== Media ==
=== Manga ===
Tono to Issho began its serialized run in the manga magazine Media Factory's Comic Flapper in 2006. The manga series parodies the exploits of several historical figures from Japan's Sengoku period (Warring States Era), such as Chousokabe Motochika, Date Masamune, Katakura Kagetsuna, Uesugi Kenshin, and Oda Nobunaga.

=== Original video animation ===
In November 2009, an original video anime adaptation of Tono to Issho was announced. The anime adaptation was released on DVD on March 25, 2010. A second anime DVD was bundled with the fifth volume collection of the manga series released on August 23, 2010.

=== Anime television series ===
After the release of the first original video anime DVD, an anime television adaptation was announced in the Mainichi Shimbun paper. The series, titled Tono to Issho: Ippunkan Gekijōu (殿といっしょ 1分間劇場, My Lord and Me: One Minute Theater), featured 12 episodes of 1.5 minutes in length and was broadcast from July 6, 2010, to September 21, 2010. A second television series, titled Tono to Issho: Gantai no Yabō (殿といっしょ ～眼帯の野望～, My Lord and Me: Eyepatch's Ambition), was announced in 2010. The second season also consists of 12 episodes, but the runtime was lengthened to 3.5 minutes and began its broadcast run on April 5, 2011. Both series are streamed by the media streaming website Crunchyroll to audiences in the United States, Canada, the United Kingdom, Ireland, Australia, New Zealand, Sweden, Denmark, Norway, Finland, Iceland, Netherlands, Singapore, Brazil, and Portugal.

==== Tono to Issho: Ippunkan Gekijōu ====
No.	Title	Original air date
1	"Date Masamune (1)" "Masamune Date [1]" (政宗 伊達[1])	July 6, 2010
2	"Date Masamune (2)" "Masamune Date [2]" (政宗 伊達[2])	July 13, 2010
3	"Motochika Chousokabe (1)" "Chōsokabe Motochika [1]" (ちょうそかべ 元親[1])	July 20, 2010
4	"Motochika Chousokabe (2)" "Chōsokabe Motochika [2]" (ちょうそかべ 元親[2])	July 27, 2010
5	"Takeda Shingen" "Shingen Takeda" (信玄 武田)	August 3, 2010
6	"Uesugi Kenshin" "Kenshin Uesugi" (謙信 上杉)	August 10, 2010
7	"Naoe Kanetsugu" "KANE TU GU Naoe※" (KANE TU GU 直江※)	August 17, 2010
8	"Oda Nobunaga" "Nobunaga Oda" (のぶ なが 織田)	August 24, 2010
9	"Nagamasa Azai" "Azai Nagamasa" (アザイ ながまさ)	August 31, 2010
10	"Katakura Kagetsuna & Date Narumi" "Katakura Kagetsuna Date Narumi" (片倉 景綱 伊達 成実)	September 7, 2010
11	"Yoshikage Asakura" "ASA KURA Yoshikage" (ASA KURA 義景)	September 14, 2010
12	"Inahime Nobuyuki" "Ine Hime [Sanada] Nobuyuki" (稲姫 [真田]信幸)	September 21, 2010

==== Tono to Issho: Gantai no Yabō ====
No.	Title	Original release date
1	"House of Uesugi" "Uesugi-ka" (上杉家)	April 5, 2011
2	"House of Date" "Date-ka" (伊達家)	April 12, 2011
3	"House of Oda" "Oda-ka" (織田家)	April 19, 2011
4	"House of Oda" "Oda-ka" (織田家)	April 26, 2011
5	"House of Sanada" "Sanada-ka" (真田家)	May 3, 2011
6	"House of Chōsokabe" "Chōsokabe-ka" (長宗我部家)	May 10, 2011
7	"House of Shimazu" "Shimazu-ka" (島津家)	May 17, 2011
8	"House of Maeda" "Maeda-ka" (前田家)	May 24, 2011
9	"House of Uesugi" "Uesugi-ka" (上杉家)	May 31, 2011
10	"House of Uesugi" "Uesugi-ka" (上杉家)	June 7, 2011
11	"House of Asai" "Asai-ka" (浅井家)	June 14, 2011
12	"House of Date" "Date-ka" (伊達家)	June 21, 2011

== Reception ==
During the Anime News Network's summer 2010 anime previews, Gia Manry commented that the first anime series would be a hard sell because of its focus on Japanese history, but that the comedy is largely based on famous historical figures saying silly things. Commenting on the second season, ANN reviewer Bamboo Dong states that it "break[s] up the monotony of the work day" and was good for a quick laugh. She also states that the writers of the second series have what it takes to translate the manga into a visual medium. In Otaku USA's preview of series being simulcast by Crunchyroll beginning in March 2011, it described Tono to Issho as a champion of the comedy genre.
