= Nura: Rise of the Yokai Clan =

Japanese manga series

- First tankōbon volume cover, featuring Rikuo Nura in his yōkai form

ぬらりひょんの孫 (Nurarihyon no Mago)
- Genre: Action; Dark fantasy; Supernatural
- Manga
- Written by: Hiroshi Shiibashi
- Published by: Shueisha
- English publisher: NA: Viz Media
- Imprint: Jump Comics
- Magazine: Weekly Shōnen Jump (March 10, 2008 – June 25, 2012); Jump Next! (August 11 – December 28, 2012)
- English magazine: NA: Weekly Shonen Jump Alpha
- Original run: March 10, 2008 – December 28, 2012
- Volumes: 25
- Anime television series
- Directed by: Junji Nishimura
- Written by: Natsuko Takahashi
- Music by: Kohei Tanaka
- Studio: Studio Deen
- Licensed by: NA: Viz Media; UK: Kazé UK
- Original network: Yomiuri TV, Tokyo MX, Chukyo TV, BS11
- English network: NA: Neon Alley; SA: Animax; SEA: Animax Asia
- Original run: July 6, 2010 – December 21, 2010
- Episodes: 24 + 1 special
- Anime television series

Nura: Rise of the Yokai Clan – Demon Capital
- Directed by: Michio Fukuda
- Written by: Hideaki Koyasu
- Music by: Kazuhiko Sawaguchi; Keiji Iuchi
- Studio: Studio Deen
- Licensed by: NA: Viz Media; UK: Kazé UK
- Original network: Tokyo MX, Yomiuri TV, BS11, Mētele
- English network: SEA: Animax Asia
- Original run: July 5, 2011 – December 20, 2011
- Episodes: 24
- Manga

Nura: Rise of the Yokai Clan – Shadow
- Written by: Hiroshi Shiibashi
- Published by: Shueisha
- Imprint: Jump Comics
- Magazine: Ultra Jump
- Original run: April 19, 2023 – July 19, 2023
- Volumes: 1
- icon

Nura: Rise of the Yokai Clan (Japanese: ぬらりひょんの孫, Hepburn: Nurarihyon no Mago; lit. 'Nurarihyon's Grandson') is a Japanese manga series written and illustrated by Hiroshi Shiibashi. It was serialized in Shueisha's shōnen manga magazine Weekly Shōnen Jump from March 2008 to June 2012, and later in Jump Next! from August to December 2012. Its chapters were collected in 25 tankōbon volumes. The series follows Rikuo Nura, a human by day and a yōkai by night, as he is destined to become the Third Heir of the Nura Clan. With the help of friends and allies, Rikuo must stop various opposing factions from usurping his position.

A 24-episode anime adaptation produced by Studio Deen was broadcast from July to December 2010. A 24-episode second season, titled Nura: Rise of the Yokai Clan – Demon Capital, was broadcast from July to December 2011.

In North America, Viz Media licensed the series for English-language release of the manga and anime adaptations. It was streamed on Viz Anime in 2010, while the 25 volumes of the manga were released from February 2011 to February 2015.

== Plot ==
Rikuo Nura is three-quarters human and one-quarter yōkai, living a dual life—human by day and yōkai by night. Residing in a house full of yōkai with his grandfather, Nurarihyon, he initially resists his destiny, performing good deeds to avoid embracing his yōkai heritage. However, he eventually accepts his role as the Third Heir of the Nura Clan (奴良組, Nura-gumi), despite opposition from factions seeking to usurp his position. To secure his leadership, he gathers allies under his banner of "Fear", forming a new Hyakki Yakō (百鬼夜行; lit. 'Night Parade of One Hundred Demons').

Rikuo's journey begins when the Kiyojuji Paranormal Patrol is lured into a trap by Gyuki, a yōkai testing Rikuo's worthiness to lead the Nura Clan. After proving his strength, Rikuo officially assumes leadership. Soon after, the clan is thrown into chaos when a board member is killed and Nurarihyon vanishes. Rikuo faces Tamazuki, leader of a rival faction from Shikoku, defeating him but sparing his life at his father's request.

The story then explores the past, detailing the origins of the Nura Clan, the creation of the spirit blade Nenekirimaru, and the battle against Hagoromo Gitsune 400 years earlier. When Hagoromo Gitsune resurfaces in Kyoto, Rikuo trains under the yōkai of Tono Village to grow stronger before joining the fight. He allies with the Keikain House to stop Hagoromo Gitsune and prevent the birth of a new evil.

Later, Rikuo confronts the remnants of the Hundred Tales Clan (百物語組, Hyaku Monogatari-gumi), a group once led by the human Sanmoto Gorozaemon, who created yōkai through storytelling. After defeating them, Rikuo learns of the Gokadoin House, a secretive onmyōji sect descended from Abe no Seimei. As they move to eradicate both yōkai and humans, Rikuo begins uniting yōkai clans across Japan against this new threat.

== Media ==
=== Manga ===
Written and illustrated by Hiroshi Shiibashi, Nura: Rise of the Yokai Clan was preceded by two one-shot chapters published in Shueisha's shōnen manga magazines Akamaru Jump on May 1, 2006, (Note: Published in the magazine's Spring 2006 issue, released on May 1 of that same year.) and in Weekly Shōnen Jump on July 30, 2007, respectively. The manga was serialized in the latter magazine from March 10, 2008, to June 25, 2012. Its final story arc ran for three chapters in the seasonally published Jump Next! from August 11 to December 28, 2012. Shueisha collected its 210 individual chapters in 25 tankōbon volumes, released from August 4, 2008, to March 4, 2013.

The manga was licensed for English release by Viz Media, who published the series chapter wise in its manga anthology Weekly Shonen Jump Alpha since the magazine's launch on January 30, 2012. The 25 volumes were released from February 1, 2011, to February 3, 2015.

11 years after its finale, a four-chapter series, titled Nura: Rise of the Yokai Clan – Shadow (ぬらりひょんの孫〜陰〜, Nurarihyon no Mago Kage), started in Shueisha's seinen manga magazine Ultra Jump on April 19, 2023, and finished on July 19 of that same year. A single volume was released on November 17, 2023.

=== Drama CD ===
A Drama CD was released on December 18, 2009.

=== Anime ===
The anime series, produced by Studio Deen, aired from July 6 to December 21, 2010. It is licensed for North America by Viz Media under the name Nura: Rise of the Yokai Clan. New episodes, subtitled in English, were made available for streaming on their website several hours after they aired in Japan. The opening themes are Fast Forward and Sunshine performed by Monkey Majik and the ending themes are Sparky Start and Symphonic Dream performed by Katate Size (Aya Hirano, Yui Horie and Ai Maeda). The episodes were collected on eight DVDs from September 23, 2010, to April 22, 2011.

The second season, Nura: Rise of the Yokai Clan – Demon Capital (ぬらりひょんの孫 千年魔京, Nurarihyon no Mago Sennen Makyō), aired in Japan from July 5 to December 20, 2011. It was made available for streaming with English subtitles the next day. Two additional 23-minute OVAs were subsequently released on December 4, 2012, and March 4, 2013, after Demon Capital finished. They were bundled with the limited edition releases of volumes 24 and 25 of the manga.

The English dub of the series was posted for streaming on Viz Media's online network, Neon Alley, which starting on October 2, 2012. Viz Media later released the series on DVD/Blu-ray on March 10, 2014. Originally it was going to be released on January 28, 2014.

=== Other print media ===
A character data book titled Nurarihyon no Mago: Official Character Data Book: Secret Ayakashi Notes (ぬらりひょんの孫 キャラクター公式データブック 妖秘録, Nurarihyon no Mago: Kyarakutā Kōshiki Dēta Bukku: Ayakashi Hiroku) was released on July 2, 2010. At 264 pages, it contains information on all the major factions in the series, as well as on Shiibashi and his assistants.

A light novel adaptation written by Satoshi Oosaki with art by Hiroshi Shiibashi was published by J-Books in December 2009. It features the stories of Nurarihyon and Yohime's wedding ceremony and a strange encounter between Zen and Kuromaru, as well as an original tale centering on the yōkai who live in Ukiyoe Town.

=== Video game ===
A video game called Nurarihyon no Mago: Hyakki Ryōran Taisen (ぬらりひょんの孫:百鬼繚乱大戦; "Nura: Rise of the Yokai Clan – Great Profuse Hyakki War") was announced as developed by Arc System Works and published by Konami. It was released in November 2011 for the PlayStation 3 and Xbox 360.

== Reception ==
The first tankōbon volume ranked ninth on Tohan manga charts, the third volume ranked fifth, the fourth volume ranked 10th, the fifth volume ranked ninth, and the sixth volume ranked eighth, and each volume starting from the third sold over 100,000 copies. By December 2018, the manga had 12 million copies in circulation, and over 13 million copies in circulation by April 2023.

Weekly Shōnen Jump allows its readers to vote on their favorite manga, giving out the Gold Future Cup award each year to the most popular manga one-shot it publishes. In 2007, the Nura: Rise of the Yokai Clan one-shot ranked first in the Gold Future Cup.

== See also ==
- Teito Monogatari: a historical fantasy novel by Hiroshi Aramata widely recognized for starting the "onmyoji boom" in Japan. The fourth volume of the light novel adaptation of Nurarihyon no Mago (entitled Teito Koi Monogatari) is a direct reference to it.
