= Recommendations from Iwamoto-senpai =

Japanese manga series

- First tankōbon volume cover

岩元先輩ノ推薦 (Iwamoto-senpai no Suisen)
- Genre: Historical
- Manga
- Written by: Hiroshi Shiibashi
- Published by: Shueisha
- Imprint: Young Jump Comics
- Magazine: Ultra Jump
- Original run: February 19, 2021 – present
- Volumes: 15
- Anime television series
- Directed by: Toshifumi Kawase
- Written by: Keiichirō Ōchi
- Music by: Yoshiaki Dewa; Tōru Ishitsuka
- Studio: Studio Deen
- Licensed by: Crunchyroll
- Original network: Tokyo MX, SUN, BS Fuji
- Original run: July 4, 2026 – September 19, 2026
- Episodes: 12
- icon

Recommendations from Iwamoto-senpai (岩元先輩ノ推薦, Iwamoto-senpai no Suisen; 'Upperclassman Iwamoto's Recommendation') is a Japanese manga series written and illustrated by Hiroshi Shiibashi. It was initially published as a one-shot published on Shueisha's Shōnen Jump+ manga service in March 2020. It later began serialization in Shueisha's seinen manga magazine Ultra Jump in February 2021. An anime television series adaptation produced by Studio Deen aired from July to September 2026.

== Plot ==
In the 1910s, Kodō Iwamoto, a middle school student at a school controlled by the military, is tasked with investigating paranormal phenomena. A case arises where a village is rumored to have black snow falling. Upon investigating, Kodō meets a boy with powers that he perceives as a sickness. Kodō shows him how to use his powers and offers him a letter of recommendation to join the school and participate in future investigations.

== Characters ==
Kodō Iwamoto (岩元胡堂, Iwamoto Kodō)
Voiced by: Taito Ban
Kai Haramachi (原町 海, Haramachi Kai)
Voiced by: Yuki Sakakihara
Sōichirō Amaha (天羽総一郎, Amaha Sōichirō)
Voiced by: Kent Itō
Bōkyo Kizujō (橘城某居, Kizujō Bōkyo)
Voiced by: Akira Ishida
Oni Okuaki (奥秋雄弐, Okuaki Oni)
Voiced by: Masaya Fukunishi
Shizuma Aonuma (青沼静馬, Aonuma Shizuma)
Voiced by: Takuma Nagatsuka
Ryū Sazame (佐々眼流雨, Sazame Ryū)
Voiced by: Gen Satō
Mizuhi Awadama (淡魂瑞火, Awadama Mizuhi)
Voiced by: Shinnosuke Tokudome

== Media ==
=== Manga ===
Written and illustrated by Hiroshi Shiibashi, Recommendations from Iwamoto-senpai was initially published as a one-shot on Shueisha's Shōnen Jump+ manga service on March 30, 2020. It later began serialization in Shueisha's seinen manga magazine Ultra Jump on February 19, 2021. Its chapters have been compiled into fifteen tankōbon volumes as of September 2026.

==== Volumes ====
No.	Release date	ISBN
1	July 16, 2021	978-4-08-892038-2
2	November 19, 2021	978-4-08-892146-4
3	March 18, 2022	978-4-08-892253-9
4	July 19, 2022	978-4-08-892380-2
5	November 17, 2022	978-4-08-892505-9
6	March 17, 2023	978-4-08-892505-9
7	November 17, 2023	978-4-08-893011-4
8	March 18, 2024	978-4-08-893173-9
9	September 19, 2024	978-4-08-893313-9
10	January 17, 2025	978-4-08-893447-1
11	May 19, 2025	978-4-08-893668-0
12	September 19, 2025	978-4-08-893809-7
13	January 19, 2026	978-4-08-894074-8
14	July 17, 2026	978-4-08-894217-9
15	September 17, 2026	978-4-08-894359-6

=== Anime ===
An anime television series adaptation was announced on January 16, 2026. It is produced by Studio Deen and directed by Toshifumi Kawase, with Keiichirō Ōchi supervising series scripts, Atsuko Nakajima designing the characters, and Yoshiaki Dewa and Tōru Ishitsuka composing the music. The series aired from July 4 to September 19, 2026, on Tokyo MX and other networks. The opening theme song is "Budding", performed by The Jet Boy Bangerz from Exile Tribe, while the ending theme song is "Koko ni Iru" (ココニイル; 'I Am Here'), performed by Wolf Howl Harmony from Exile Tribe. Crunchyroll is streaming the series.

==== Episodes ====
No.	Title	Directed by	Written by	Storyboarded by	Original release date
1	"Black Snow"; Transliteration: "Kuroi Yuki" (Japanese: 黒イ雪)	Masahiko Watanabe	Keiichirō Ōchi	Toshifumi Kawase	July 4, 2026
2	"The Bond-Severing Sickles"; Transliteration: "Enkiri no Kama" (Japanese: 縁切リノ鎌)	Shunji Yoshida	Keiichirō Ōchi	Kiyotaka Ōhata	July 11, 2026
3	"The Lad Who Loved Insects"; Transliteration: "Mushi Mezuru Kimi" (Japanese: 蟲愛ヅル君)	Kōhei Kawai	Sayaka Harada	Hitoyuki Matsui	July 18, 2026
4	Transliteration: "Shibito Densetsu to Gasu Kōjō" (Japanese: 屍人伝説ト瓦斯工場)	Taiei Andou	Yuka Yamada	Hitoyuki Matsui	July 25, 2026
5	Transliteration: "Kamigoroshi no Honoo" (Japanese: 神殺シノ炎)	Toshifumi Kawase	Keiichirō Ōchi	Toshifumi Kawase	August 1, 2026
6	Transliteration: "Majo no Shinkō" (Japanese: 魔女ノ侵攻)	Kanta Shiba	Sayaka Harada	Ryōji Fujiwara	August 8, 2026
7	Transliteration: "Zankyō no Haine" (Japanese: 残響ノ廃音)	Yū Yabuuchi & Matsuo Asami	Sayaka Harada	Kazuomi Koga & Ryōji Fujiwara	August 15, 2026
8	Transliteration: "Tsūshō • Kaiki Hako-otoko" (Japanese: 通称・怪奇箱男)	Shunji Yoshida	Yuka Yamada	Miyana Okita	August 22, 2026
9	Transliteration: "Sukima Otoko to Hako Otoko" (Japanese: 隙間男ト箱男)	Taiei Andou	Yuka Yamada	Goichi Iwahata	August 29, 2026
10	Transliteration: "Dōji Tahatsu Ryūsei Jiken to Denpa Bukken to Nensha Otoko" (Japanese: 同時多発流星事件ト電波物件ト念写男)	Naoki Murata	Takumi Fukaya	Hitoyuki Matsui	September 5, 2026
11	Transliteration: "Doku-otoko" (Japanese: 毒男)	Hiromichi Matano	Keiichirō Ōchi	Taiei Andou	September 12, 2026
