= Yui Kamio Lets Loose =

Japanese manga series by Hiroshi Shiibashi

- First tankōbon volume cover, featuring Yui Kamio in both her "Black" and "White" forms

神緒ゆいは髪を結い (Kamio Yui wa Kami o Yui)
- Genre: Comedy, supernatural
- Manga
- Written by: Hiroshi Shiibashi
- Published by: Shueisha
- English publisher: NA: Viz Media
- Imprint: Jump Comics
- Magazine: Weekly Shōnen Jump
- Original run: March 11, 2019 – November 25, 2019
- Volumes: 4
- icon

Yui Kamio Lets Loose (Japanese: 神緒ゆいは髪を結い, Hepburn: Kamio Yui wa Kami o Yui; lit. "Yui Kamio's Hair Is Tied") is a Japanese manga series written and illustrated by Hiroshi Shiibashi. It was serialized in Shueisha's shōnen manga magazine Weekly Shōnen Jump from March to November 2019, with its chapters collected in four tankōbon volumes. Viz Media and Shueisha simulpublished the series in English on their Shonen Jump and Manga Plus digital services, respectively.

== Plot ==
Set at the elite Teiyo Private Academy, Kiito Sonomiya—a charismatic member of the privileged "Life Lovers" group—has his orderly life upended when he falls for Yui Kamio, a seemingly perfect honor student. Unbeknownst to him, Yui harbors a split personality: her gentle, admired self, "White Yui", and the violent delinquent "Black Yui", who emerges when her lock-shaped hair accessory is removed. Feared as the "Dark Deity", Black Yui's ruthless fighting skills make her infamous among students.

When Yui's childhood friend Nao Ebisuno entrusts Kiito with a spare hair lock to control her transformations, he is thrust into chaos. As they struggle to suppress Black Yui's outbursts, vengeful delinquents constantly target them, forcing Kiito to navigate the turmoil of Yui's dual personas and the conflicts they unleash.

== Publication ==
Written and illustrated by Hiroshi Shiibashi, Yui Kamio Lets Loose was serialized in Shueisha's shōnen manga magazine Weekly Shōnen Jump from March 11 to November 25, 2019. Shueisha collected its 36 chapters in four tankōbon volumes, released from July 4, 2019, to February 4, 2020.

Viz Media and Shueisha simulpublished the series in English on their digital services Shonen Jump and Manga Plus, respectively. Viz Media announced the digital release of the volumes in November 2019. The volumes were released from February 25 to August 25, 2020.

=== Volumes ===
No.	Original release date	Original ISBN	English release date	English ISBN
1	July 4, 2019	978-4-08-881883-2	February 25, 2020 (digital)	978-1-9747-1799-6
01. "The Phantom Black Sailor Uniform" (幻の黒セーラー, Maboroshi no Kuro Sērā); 02. "Which Yui Do You Prefer? (どっちのゆいが好き?, Dotchi no Yui ga Suki?); 03. "A Sparkly Visitor" (シャイニーお礼参り, Shainī Oreimairi); 04. "Prima Donna Punch-Out" (オルチャン激突祭, Oruchan Gekitotsusai); 05. "Date in White, Date in Black" (白デート・黒デート, Shiro Dēto Kuro Dēto); 06. "Kara's Stupendous Security Guys" (カーラの華麗なるSP, Kāra no Karei naru Esu Pī); 07. "Battle Tendency" (戦闘潮流, Sentō Chōryū)
2	September 4, 2019	978-4-08-882052-1	April 28, 2020 (digital)	978-1-9747-1800-9
08. "Busting In! Chez Kiito" (突撃!!鍵斗(キィト)邸, Totsugeki!! Kyito-tei); 09. "Who Needs a Chain?" (鎖なんていらない!, Kusari Nante Iranai!); 10. "Fracas! At the Station" (激闘!!駅前大戦, Gekitō!! Ekimae Taisen); 11. "Koyagi Yaginuma Creeps Close" (山羊沼こやぎは策を練り, Yaginuma Koyagi wa Saku o Neri); 12. "The Darkness Inside Her" (黒い所もある女, Kuroi Tokoro mo Aru Onna); 13. "White Velvet" (純白(しろ)の天鵞絨(ビロード), Shiro no Birōdo); 14. "False Smiling Musetto" (偽りのMusetto「笑顔」, Itsuwari no Muzetto "Egao"); 15. "The Key" ("鍵", "Kagi"); 16. "It Will Be Glad" (恐怖(それ)が喜ぶ, Sore ga Yokorobu)
3	December 4, 2019	978-4-08-882143-6	June 23, 2020 (digital)	978-1-9747-1805-4
17. "Cool Door Handles" (Note: "COLD DOOR HANDLES" in the original Japanese release); 18. "Dolls of Grievance" (日本人形・意趣遺恨, Nihonningyō: Ishuikon); 19. "Kiito Sonomiya Ties Hair Tight" (園宮鍵斗(キィト)は髪を結い, Sonomiya Kyito wa Kami o Yui); 20. "Kiito Thinks a Lot → Conclusion" (鍵斗(キィト)は色々考えている→結果, Kyito wa Iroiro Kangaete Iru → Kekka); 21. "Death Spell" (死の旋律(デススペル), Desu Superu); 22. "Memento Mori? Carpe Diem?"; 23. "Symphony of Screams" (絶叫のシンフォニー, Zekkyō no Shinfonī); 24. "In Praise of Mortality" (死想礼賛, Shisō Raisan); 25. "Duet" (連弾, Rendan); 26. "All Talk" ("口だけ"の男, "Kuchidake" no Otoko)
4	February 4, 2020	978-4-08-882203-7	August 25, 2020 (digital)	978-1-9747-2091-0
27. "Yacht Party" (船上パーティ, Senjō Pāti); 28. "The Boss in the Lonely Castle of Mirrors" (かがみの孤城に棲む女王(スケバン), Kagami no Kojō ni Sumu Sukeban); 29. "Love's Revenge" (愛の御礼参り, Ai no Oreimairi); 30. "Girl Bosses vs. Special Security Police" (スケバンVS特殊SP, Sukeban Bāsasu Tokushu Esu Pī); 31. "Love Never Dies" (愛は死なない(ラブ・ネバー・ダイズ), Rabu Nebā Daizu); 32. "Promised Love"; 33. "Yui in White's Resolve" (白ゆいの決意, Shiro Yui no Ketsui); 34. "Closed Off in Yamatai" (閉ざされた邪馬台国, Tozasareta Yamataikoku); 35. "The Key to Her Awakening" ("覚醒"の鍵, "Kakusei" no Kagi); 36. "Yui Kamio Lets Loose" (神緒ゆいは髪を結い, Kamio Yui wa Kami o Yui)
