= Hiroshi Shiibashi =

Japanese manga artist

Hiroshi Shiibashi 椎橋寛
- Born: June 6, 1980 (age 46) Suita, Osaka, Japan
- Area: Manga artist
- Notable works: Nura: Rise of the Yokai Clan

Hiroshi Shiibashi (椎橋寛, Shiibashi Hiroshi; born June 6, 1980, Suita, Osaka, Japan) is a Japanese manga artist, known for the manga Nura: Rise of the Yokai Clan, which has been adapted into an anime series. He has worked as an assistant on Hirohiko Araki's series Steel Ball Run. He ranked tenth on Nikkei Entertainment's 2011 list of most successful manga artists by sales since 2010.

== Works ==
Title	Year	Notes	Refs
Nura: Rise of the Yokai Clan	2008–12	Serialized in Weekly Shōnen Jump and Jump Next! Published by Shueisha in 25 volumes	
Illegal Rare	2014	Published in 4 volumes	
Yui Kamio Lets Loose	2019	Published in 4 volumes	
Recommendations from Iwamoto-senpai	2021–present	Serialized in Ultra Jump; Published in 13 volumes as of January 2026	
