= Puchimas! Petit Idolmaster =

Manga series written and illustrated by Akane

- Cover of Puchimas! Petit Idolmaster volume 1 featuring Ritsuko Akizuki and the Puchidols Chihya and Harukasan

ぷちます! -PETIT IDOLM@STER- (Puchimasu! Puchi Aidorumasutā)
- Genre: Comedy, Slice of life
- Created by: Bandai Namco Games
- Manga
- Written by: Akane
- Published by: ASCII Media Works
- Magazine: Dengeki Maoh
- Original run: September 2008 – February 2027
- Volumes: 16
- Original video animation
- Directed by: Mankyū
- Studio: Gathering
- Released: October 27, 2012
- Original net animation
- Directed by: Mankyū
- Studio: Gathering
- Licensed by: NA: Funimation
- Released: January 1, 2013 – March 29, 2013
- Episodes: 64
- Original video animation

Takatsuki Gold Densetsu Special!! Harukasan Matsuri
- Directed by: Mankyū
- Studio: Gathering
- Licensed by: NA: Funimation
- Released: March 27, 2013 – May 29, 2013
- Episodes: 6
- Original net animation

Puchimas!! Petit Petit Idolmaster
- Directed by: Mankyū
- Studio: Gathering
- Licensed by: NA: Funimation
- Released: April 1, 2014 – June 30, 2014
- Episodes: 74

Puchimas! Petit Idolmaster (ぷちます! -PETIT IDOLM@STER-, Puchimasu! Puchi Aidorumasutā) is a Japanese four-panel manga series written and illustrated by Akane, based on Bandai Namco Games' The Idolmaster franchise. The series revolves around the daily lives of the idols of 765 Production as they are joined by miniaturized versions of themselves known as Puchidols. The manga began serialization in the September 2008 issue of ASCII Media Works' Dengeki Maoh magazine and will conclude in February 2027. An original net animation (ONA) series by Gathering was streamed online between January and March 2013, with a second season streamed between April and June 2014.

== Plot and characters ==
The daily lives of the idols and staff of the talent agency 765 Production are changed when the idols meet miniaturized versions of themselves known as Puchidols (ぷちどる, Puchidoru; lit. petit idol), each with their own unique personalities.

=== Puchidols ===
Yukipo (ゆきぽ)
Voiced by: Azumi Asakura
The Puchidol version of Yukiho Hagiwara. A timid Puchidol who enjoys tea and often takes rests, either in boxes or holes that she has dug herself. She grows a tanuki tail when it is cold.
Afu (あふぅ)
Voiced by: Akiko Hasegawa
The Puchidol version of Miki Hoshii. A cheeky Puchidol who loves eating onigiri; she sleeps so heavily that onigiri is the only reliable way to wake her up. Her hair turns brown and shorter in the summer.
Chihya (ちひゃー, Chihyā)
Voiced by: Asami Imai
The Puchidol version of Chihaya Kisaragi. A Puchidol who enjoys skinship with flat-chested girls but is violent towards larger chested girls, the exception being Ritsuko. In the winter, her hair grows to great lengths, also forming cat-like ears.
Harukasan (はるかさん)
Voiced by: Eriko Nakamura
The Puchidol version of Haruka Amami. She is similar to Gremlins in that she multiplies when coming into contact with water, hates bright sunlight, and turns vicious when eating snacks after midnight. She also changes into a larger version often used as transport when in a large body of water.
Yayo (やよ)
Voiced by: Mayako Nigo
The Puchidol version of Yayoi Takatsuki. A curious Puchidol who reacts to the sound of money being dropped, often seen catching a 10 yen coin after one bounce. Her hair puffs out during cold weather and she grows bamboo shoots in the spring.
Chicchan (ちっちゃん, Chitchan)
Voiced by: Naomi Wakabayashi
The Puchidol version of Ritsuko Akizuki. Like Ritsuko, she is a busy worker and is often ordering the other Puchidols around.
Koami (こあみ) and Komami (こまみ)
Voiced by: Asami Shimoda
The Puchidol versions of Ami and Mami Futami. A pair of mischievous Puchidols who love to play pranks on others.
Piyo Piyo (ぴよぴよ)
Voiced by: Juri Takita
The Puchidol version of Kotori Otonashi. A very capable Puchidol who is better at her job than Kotori herself. She is also able to fly.
Makochi (まこちー-, Makochī)
Voiced by: Hiromi Hirata
The Puchidol version of Makoto Kikuchi. A tough Puchidol who is incredibly strong and also has healing powers. She often gains weight due to Makoto overfeeding her.
Miurasan (みうらさん)
Voiced by: Chiaki Takahashi
The Puchidol version of Azusa Miura. A ditzy Puchidol who has the habit of teleporting herself, and anyone near her, to a random location upon hearing sharp noises.
Io (いお)
Voiced by: Rie Kugimiya
The Puchidol version of Iori Minase. A tsundere Puchidol who is capable of firing laser beams from her forehead.
Chibiki (ちびき)
Voiced by: Manami Numakura
The Puchidol version of Hibiki Ganaha. An easily-frightened Puchidol who summons various animals whenever she starts crying or gets frightened.
Takanya (たかにゃ)
Voiced by: Yumi Hara
The Puchidol version of Takane Shijou. A refined Puchidol who mainly communicates in writing kanji and loves eating ramen.

== Media ==
=== Manga ===
Puchimas! Petit Idolmaster is a four-panel comic strip manga series written and illustrated by Akane. It started serialization in the September 2008 issue of ASCII Media Works' Dengeki Maoh magazine. The first tankōbon volume was published on November 27, 2009, and 15 volumes have been released as of December 27, 2024.

=== Anime ===
A 64-episode original net animation (ONA) adaptation began streaming on Animate.tv and Niconico every weekday between January 1 and March 29, 2013. Funimation began simulcasting the series on January 14, 2013. The episodes were released on three Blu-ray Disc (BD) and DVD compilation volumes between March 27 and May 29, 2013. An original video animation (OVA) episode was bundled with Dengeki Maoh on October 27, 2012. Another OVA, titled Takatsuki Gold Legend Special!! Harukasan Festival (高槻ゴールド伝説すぺしゃる!! はるかさん祭り, Takatsuki Gōrudo Densetsu Supesharu!! Harukasan Matsuri), was released consisting of six episodes; three bundled with the limited edition of the fifth manga volume released on March 27, 2013, and three included in each BD/DVD volume of the series. A second season, titled Puchimas!! Petit Petit Idolmaster (ぷちます!! プチプチ・アイドルマスター, Puchimasu!! Puchi Puchi Aidorumasutā), was streamed on Niconico for 74 episodes between April 1 and June 30, 2014, and was also simulcast by Funimation.

The opening theme is "La♪La♪La♪ Wonderland" (ら♪ら♪ら♪わんだぁらんど, Ra♪Ra♪Ra♪ Wandārando). For the first season, the main ending theme for episodes 1-23 is "A-ri-ga-to Yesterdays" (あ・り・が・と・YESTERDAYS; "Thank You Yesterdays") by Haruka (Eriko Nakamura), Makoto (Hiromi Hirata), Miki (Akiko Hasegawa) and Ritsuko (Naomi Wakabayashi), the ending theme for episodes 24-43 is "Today With Me" by Chihaya (Asami Imai), Yukiho (Azumi Asakura), Hibiki (Manami Numakura), Ami and Mami (Asami Shimoda), the ending theme for episodes 44-63 is "Maybe Tomorrow" by Yayoi (Mayako Nigo), Takane (Yumi Hara), Azusa (Chiaki Takahashi) and Iori (Rie Kugimiya), and the ending theme for episodes 64 and OVA is "La♪La♪La♪Wonderland" by 765PRO ALLSTARS featuring Puchidol. For the second season, the first opening theme is "Ohayo Sunshine" (オハヨ○サンシャイン, Ohayo Sanshain; "Good Morning Sunshine") by Yayoi, Iori, Hibiki, Ami, and Mami.
