= Toxiphobia =

Fear of poisons and being poisoned

Toxiphobia in non-human animals is rejection of foods with tastes, odors, or appearances which are followed by illness resulted from toxins found in these foods. In humans, toxiphobia is the irrational fear of poisons and being poisoned.

== Etymology ==
The term "Toxikophobia" derives from Ancient Greek and combines the words "toxikon" (τοξικόν) for "poison" or "poison arrow" and "phobos" (φόβος) for "fear" or "anxiety". Literally, "Toxikophobia" thus means "fear of poison".

== Psychiatry ==
Toxikophobia (also described as Toxicophobia, Toxophobia, or Iophobia) refers in psychiatric medicine to that disease which triggers panic-like fear of poisoning in pathological form. In the medical-psychological context, the term describes a specific phobia where affected individuals develop an exaggerated and often unfounded fear of poisoning or contact with toxic substances.

=== Causes ===
The causes of toxikophobia are varied. Frequently, the phobia is based on a concrete negative experience, such as food poisoning or an allergic shock that was experienced as traumatic. Witnessing such events in close acquaintances can also be sufficient to develop an exaggerated fear. Furthermore, genetic factors and increased vulnerability to anxiety disorders play a role. Overprotective parenting, alarmist media reports about environmental toxins or toxic substances in everyday products can also contribute to the development of this phobia. Neurobiologically, it is suspected that the amygdala - a brain region responsible for processing fear - reacts particularly sensitively to potentially dangerous stimuli in affected individuals.

=== Symptoms ===
People with toxikophobia often live in constant worry of being unknowingly poisoned. Even the thought of certain foods, substances or situations can trigger intense feelings of fear. They frequently avoid eating out, refuse to take medications, or only drink self-prepared beverages. Some affected individuals develop rituals to protect themselves from alleged poisoning, such as repeated washing, checking packaging, or storing food under special conditions. Specific fears of certain chemicals may also develop, which can lead to avoidance of amalgam or lead due to their potential long-term effects.

Patients particularly fear substances that could poison them inconspicuously - materials that cause no immediately visible harm but might, for example, reduce intelligence quotient unnoticed. Chemicals without concrete ADI values trigger the most intense panic attacks in patients, as these could theoretically cause bodily harm even in minimal quantities. In such cases, specifically those bodily functions are considered potentially poisoned that have no upper limit of functionality. Thus, for instance, the theoretically infinite brain function is seen as threatened when patients suspect even minimal lead poisoning, since - due to the absence of an ADI value - some exposure exists after every contact, though not meeting the definition of lead poisoning itself, but within critical measurement ranges.

Physical reactions range from heart palpitations and nausea to panic attacks. This behavior is often associated with significant distress that can severely impact both social and professional life.

=== Treatment ===
The treatment of toxikophobia follows established methods for specific phobias. Cognitive behavioral therapy is considered particularly effective. Patients learn to identify their irrational assumptions about poisons and dangers and replace them with more realistic thoughts. A central component is exposure therapy, where patients are gradually confronted with anxiety-triggering stimuli to experience that the feared catastrophe does not occur. This might involve consciously consuming a beverage perceived as "unsafe" or reintegrating certain foods into their diet. For severe symptoms, medications like SSRIs may be used for stabilization. Online-based self-help programs and digital therapy options have also shown initial positive effects, particularly for milder forms of the phobia.

== Notable people ==
- Kurt Gödel (1906–1978), Austrian-American scientist who, after the assassination of his close friend Moritz Schlick, developed an irrational fear of being poisoned, and only accepted food cooked by his wife.
- Nicolae Ceaușescu (1918–1989), Romanian dictator, who ordered not to have any air conditioning in Palace of the Parliament due to fear of being poisoned by ventilation.

== See also ==
- Foodborne illness
