= Mayako Nigo =

Japanese voice actress

Mayako Nigo (仁後真耶子, Nigo Mayako; born December 2, 1979) is a Japanese voice actress from Tokyo, Japan. She was married since April 2014 and that she has given birth to a boy on January 1, 2016.

== Filmography ==
=== Television animation ===
- Angel Tales (TV) as Hamster no Kurumi
- Rozen Maiden (TV) as Mrs. Rabbit (ep 3)
- Tenshi no Shippo Chu! (TV) as Hamster Kurumi
- The Idolmaster as Yayoi Takatsuki
  - Puchimas! Petit Idolmaster as Yayoi Takatsuki and Yayo
- Dragon Crisis! as Misaki Etō

=== Video games ===
- The Idolmaster series as Yayoi Takatsuki
- Mugen Souls Z as Reu
- Rainbow Islands: Putty's Party as Putty
- Arcana Heart series as Lilica Felchenerow
