= Isobe Isobē Monogatari =

Japanese manga series and its adaptations

- First tankōbon volume cover, featuring Isobē Isobe

磯部磯兵衛物語〜浮世はつらいよ〜 (Isobe Isobē Monogatari Ukiyo wa Tsurai yo)
- Genre: Comedy, historical
- Manga
- Written by: Ryo Nakama
- Published by: Shueisha
- Imprint: Jump Comics
- Magazine: Weekly Shōnen Jump
- Original run: October 21, 2013 – October 16, 2017
- Volumes: 16
- Television drama
- Directed by: Toru Hosokawa
- Produced by: Haruna Ueda; Shiori Kodaka; Kōsuke Katō; Atsushi Morii
- Written by: Toru Hosokawa
- Music by: Atsushi Hirasawa
- Original network: Wowow
- Original run: July 12, 2024 – September 13, 2024
- Episodes: 10
- icon

Isobe Isobē Monogatari Ukiyo wa Tsurai yo (磯部磯兵衛物語〜浮世はつらいよ〜; lit. 'Chronicle of Isobē Isobe: The Life Is Hard') is a Japanese manga series written and illustrated by Ryo Nakama. A number of one-shot chapters were published in Shueisha's Weekly Shōnen Jump from May to August 2013 before being serialized in the same magazine from October 2013 to October 2017. Its chapters were collected in 16 tankōbon volumes.

It was adapted into a Flash anime in October 2013, and a series of "manime" (short anime of 30 seconds) were streamed online in 2015, and appeared at Japanese cinemas as intermissions, in Japanese stores and television in 2016. A second season premiered in 2017. A stage play adaptation premiered in 2016. A ten-episode live-action television drama adaptation aired from July to September 2024.

== Story ==
The story follows Isobē Isobe, a young man training to become a samurai during Japan's Edo period. Despite his aspirations for martial excellence, Isobē's indolent nature consistently undermines his progress. The narrative humorously depicts his daily life in Edo as he indulges in leisurely pursuits rather than disciplined study, resulting in little advancement toward his samurai ambitions.

== Characters ==
Isobē Isobe (磯部磯兵衛, Isobe Isobē)
Voiced by: Daiki Yamashita
Portrayed by: Yosuke Sugino
Jō Nakajima (中島襄, Nakajima Jō)
Voiced by: Ayumu Murase
Portrayed by: Fuku Suzuki
Mother (母上, Hahaue)
Voiced by: Chiaki Takahashi
Portrayed by: Rei Dan
Gennai Hiraga (平賀源内, Hiraga Gennai)
Voiced by: Takashi Matsuyama
Portrayed by: Kanji Tsuda

== Media ==
=== Manga ===
Written and illustrated by Ryo Nakama, various Isobe Isobē Monogatari one-shot chapters were published in Shueisha's Weekly Shōnen Jump from May 27 to August 5, 2013. It was then serialized in the same magazine from October 21, 2013, to October 16, 2017. Various other chapters were published in other Shueisha's magazines: in V Jump on October 21, 2013; in Saikyō Jump on December 26, 2013, and June 4, 2014; in Jump Next! from December 27, 2013, to October 13, 2015; and Spur on May 20, 2014. Two extra chapters after the main series finished were published in Jump Giga on November 24, 2017, and another on Shōnen Jump+ digital platform on January 4, 2018. Shueisha collected its chapters in 16 tankōbon volumes, released from February 4, 2014, to January 4, 2018.

==== Volumes ====
No.	Japanese release date	Japanese ISBN
1	February 4, 2014	978-4-08-880048-6
2	May 2, 2014	978-4-08-880121-6
3	July 4, 2014	978-4-08-880139-1
4	October 3, 2014	978-4-08-880196-4
5	January 5, 2015	978-4-08-880277-0
6	April 3, 2015	978-4-08-880333-3
7	July 3, 2015	978-4-08-880427-9
8	October 3, 2015	978-4-08-880487-3
9	February 4, 2016	978-4-08-880605-1
10	May 2, 2016	978-4-08-880671-6
11	August 4, 2016	978-4-08-880750-8
12	November 4, 2016	978-4-08-880807-9
13	March 3, 2017	978-4-08-881022-5
14	July 4, 2017	978-4-08-881181-9
15	November 2, 2017	978-4-08-881223-6
16	January 4, 2018	978-4-08-881318-9

=== Anime ===
A Flash anime adaptation was announced with the serialized manga debut in October 2013. The four episodes premiered in 2013. A series of "mame anime" (bean anime) or "manime" for short (described as a short anime of approximately 30 seconds in length) debuted online on December 12, 2015, and was available on the Japanese video streaming services GYAO! and dTV. It was also presented by Shochiku at the Shinjuku Piccadilly, MOVIX, and SMT cinemas as intermissions, in the Shosen Book Tower and Shosen Grande bookstores, in Animate stores nationwide. The episodes also appeared on television. More episodes were streamed in April and a DVD was released on April 27, 2016. The entirety of the manime and a "special video" for the series were screening at the Jump Special Anime Festa, held from November 27 and December 4, 2016. A second season of the manime premiered on March 6, 2017.

=== Stage play ===
A stage play adaptation ran at the Osaka's ABC Hall for 10 performances from April 20–26, 2016. It starred Takuya Inoue as Isobe Isobē and Yoshihiro Nakayama as Mother. It was directed and scripted by Kenichi Suemitsu with music composed by Shunsuke Wada.

=== Drama ===
A 10-episode live-action television drama adaptation was announced on March 13, 2024. The drama is written and directed by Toru Hosokawa, with Atsushi Hirasawa composing the music, and Haruna Ueda, Shiori Kodaka, Kōsuke Katō, and Atsushi Morii credited as producers. It aired from July 12 to September 13, 2024, on Wowow.

== Reception ==
The series placed 47th out of 50 titles on Da Vinci's magazine 15th "Book of the Year" list in 2014. It ranked tenth on a 2017 poll of the "strongest" gag manga to ever appear in Weekly Shōnen Jump, conducted by Goo Ranking website. In a poll conducted by Goo Ranking asking fans about what manga they think would be the next "poster manga" of Weekly Shōnen Jump, the series placed ninth out of 20 titles. The series ranked third in the first Next Manga Award in the print manga category.

== See also ==
- High School Family, another manga series by the same author
