= List of Junjō Romantica episodes =

The anime series 'Junjō Romantica' is based on the yaoi series Junjō Romantica by Shungiku Nakamura.

Produced by Studio Deen, the anime episodes follow the manga series of the same name by Shungiku Nakamura. Premiering in Japan on TV Hokkaido on April 10, 2008, the series' first season ran for twelve episodes until its conclusion on June 26, 2008. A second season premiered on the same channel on October 12, 2008, where it also ran for twelve episodes. On August 29, 2013, it was announced that more episodes are in production. The third season began airing on July 8, 2015.

The series uses four pieces of theme music: two opening themes then two ending themes. Pigstar performs both opening themes, with the song "Kimi=Hana" (君=花, lit. 'You=Flower') used for the opening theme, and "Shōdō" (衝動, lit. 'Impulse') for the second season. For the ending theme, "Baby Romantica" (ベイビーロマンチカ) by Script is used for the first season's episodes, while "Aioi -Aioi-" (相生-アイオイ-, lit. 'Developing') by Juned is used for the second. The opening theme in the third season is "Innocent Graffiti" by Fo'xTails and the ending theme is "Kawaranai Sora" (変わらない空 -|lit "Unchanging Sky") by Luck Life.

== Episode listing ==
=== Season 1 ===
No.	Title	Original release date
1	"Truth is stranger than fiction" Transliteration: "Jijitsu wa Shōsetsu yori mo Ki nari" (Japanese: 事実は小説よりも奇なり)	April 10, 2008
Misaki Takahashi is doing poorly in school. His brother Takahiro arranges for his eccentric best friend, the author Akihiko Usami (nicknamed and generally referred to as Usagi, or rabbit), to tutor Misaki. At Usami's house, Misaki discovers a romance novel starring Usami and his brother. Misaki confronts the writer, but ends up getting harassed by a grumpy Usami. With time, his study results improve, and he grows sympathetic towards Usami, who has an unrequited crush on Takahiro. When Takahiro announces his engagement, Usami and Misaki become closer. When Takahiro and his wife suddenly have to move to Osaka, Misaki decides to live in Usami's house in return for doing housework such as laundry, dishes, cooking dinner, and cleaning. Early on it is shown that Misaki and Usami eat together and later shows that Usami thinks of them as a family.
2	"No use crying over spilt milk" Transliteration: "Kōkai Saki ni Tatazu" (Japanese: 後悔先に立たず)	April 17, 2008
It has been a month since Misaki started living in the house of Akihiko Usami. Misaki has been accepted by the department of Economics at Mitsuhashi University. Ever since the second day of school, everyone acts weird towards Misaki and avoids him. His new friend Sumi Keiichi tells him everyone probably wonders why he gets dropped off every day by Akihiko Usami, the famous writer, in a red sports car. Usami acts jealous of Misaki's new friend, and Misaki wonders if Usami only likes him as a substitute for his brother. They argue, but then make up and Usami admits he was jealous. This results in Usami and Misaki having sex and Usami telling Misaki not to let anyone else touch him like he had. Usami realizes he is falling in love with Misaki and Misaki feels something is changing in him as well.
3	"Knock and it shall be opened unto you" Transliteration: "Tatakeyo saraba Hirakaren" (Japanese: 叩けよさらば開かれん)	April 24, 2008
Hiroki Kamijou is sitting in a park remembering his fruitless relationship with his childhood friend and crush, Akihiko Usami. His thoughts are abruptly disturbed when Nowaki Kusama launches a toy rocket that almost hits Hiroki. Nowaki sees him crying and immediately drags him off to a group of men watching the rocket. Hiroki learns that Nowaki is a foundling. Nowaki later insists on Hiroki becoming his tutor, to help him with the high school proficiency exam. Akihiko makes a surprise visit, but Nowaki interrupts and confesses his love for Hiroki. He says he fell in love the moment he saw him. All he wants right now is Hiroki to fall in love with him. Hiroki denies his love and tells Nowaki never to see him again. But it is shown later that Hiroki can't stop thinking about Nowaki and actually goes to spy on Nowaki from the cafe across the street from the flower shop where Nowaki works. Nowaki sees Hiroki, and confronts him about it in Hiroki's apartment. This is followed by Hiroki admitting that he is falling in love with Nowaki and thus they have sex. The episode ends with both confessing their love to each other.
4	"Fear is often greater than the danger itself" Transliteration: "Anzuru yori Umu ga Yasushi" (Japanese: 案ずるより生むが易し)	May 1, 2008
Misaki discovers yet another BL book about him and Usami. While he's upset he also angers Usami, but he is 'saved' when Usami's editor, Aikawa arrives. It seems like Usami is having some problems with deadlines. Sumi-senpai suggests to Misaki that Usami has a relationship with Aikawa. This makes Misaki very jealous, and he also wonders if his own feelings are genuine. When Usami leaves with Aikawa, Misaki eats chocolates that were given to him by Aikawa but later shown that they were filled with liquor, which causes him to feel tipsy. He falls asleep cuddling Usami's shirt. Misaki tells Usami that he loves him, but the next day refuses to.
5	"Meeting in the beginning of parting" Transliteration: "Au wa Wakare no Hajime" (Japanese: 会うは別れの始め)	May 8, 2008
Six years (as stated in the episode (or next)) later after the events of episode 3, Nowaki returns from America after a year and is greeted (quite violently) by Hiroki, who believed that Nowaki left without a word to him. After Nowaki notices Hiroki's obvious anger, he tries to leave. Hiroki stops him because he cannot bear to see Nowaki leave again. Nowaki learns that Hiroki has become an assistant professor of Japanese Literature at Mitsuhashi University under Miyagi Yō. The next day Hiroki awakens to find Nowaki gone and a note saying "I'll be back," causing him even more distress. Hiroki realizes that he cannot continue with the pain of not knowing how important he is to Nowaki, and leaves a note telling him "I'm breaking up with you". He moves house and changes all his numbers. Nowaki comes to Hiroki's office and tries to reason with him, but Hiroki doesn't want to despite the fact that he still loves Nowaki. He tells him to leave, but Nowaki, speaking from the other side of a door Hiroki has closed, says he will wait for Hiroki at their 'usual' restaurant at 7 and turns to leave. However, Nowaki sees Miyagi entering the office jokingly calling Hiroki "my sweet honey", and automatically jumps to the wrong conclusion: that Miyagi and Hiroki are lovers.
6	"Good can come out of misfortune" Transliteration: "Wazawai Tenji te Fuku to nasu" (Japanese: 禍転じて福となす)	May 15, 2008
Continues from the last episode. Nowaki, contemplating Miyagi and Hiroki's relationship, is asked to greet a professor flying in from America. He agrees, believing he can still meet Hiroki, but the flight is delayed. Hiroki goes to the restaurant an hour early and waits for hours for Nowaki. Nowaki rushes to the restaurant, already late. Hiroki eventually leaves, believing Nowaki doesn't love him anymore. Nowaki makes it just as Hiroki leaves but they don't see each other. Miyagi is surprised by a dripping wet Hiroki in his office and attempts to 'comfort' him, but is stopped when Nowaki barges into the office, seeing what Nowaki was implying he rushed and became violent. Nowaki drags Hiroki away but ends up chasing him into the library. Here Nowaki admits that he wanted to be the kind of man that would make Hiroki proud to be his lover. Hiroki breaks down and admits that he loves Nowaki, and the two make love in the library. Later, while Nowaki is moving in with Hiroki, Hiroki finds a bag full of letters to him that Nowaki never posted, and refuses to give them up as he is so happy just to have them. The episode ends with Hiroki remembering that in a distracted moment, he was the one who advised Nowaki to study abroad in America.
7	"Spare the rod and spoil the child" Transliteration: "Kawaii Ko ni wa Tabi o sase yo" (Japanese: 可愛い子には旅をさせよ)	May 22, 2008
Misaki is having a hard time with Usami again. He has difficulty picturing himself as Usagi's lover despite having made love with him and admitting that he may love him. Usagi's answer is to go on a date and end up at a fancy restaurant. Misaki is actually enjoying himself till Usagi's drunken editor-in-chief, Isaka-san, interrupts and Misaki realizes he hardly knows anything about Usagi's past. Isaka is removed, and later Usagi and Misaki are on a large slow Ferris wheel. Misaki gets mad because Isaka knew more about Usagi's history than he does. Usagi is happy knowing that Misaki is jealous over him again and tells him that he loves him. Misaki tries to block it out but ends up making love with Usagi again once they get home. The next day Misaki finds a brochure on different restaurants with loads of tags in the pages. Realizing that Usagi went through so much trouble to pick a place to eat with him he goes to thank him only to be stopped by the appearance of another AkihikoxMisaki BL novel. After the ending credits Takahiro, Misaki's elder brother, phones Usagi. Usagi tells Misaki to leave the room. When Usagi returns he tells Misaki that Takahiro is coming back to Tokyo and is going to take Misaki back.
8	"Away from home, one needs feel no shame" Transliteration: "Tabi no Haji wa kaki Sute" (Japanese: 旅の恥はかき捨て)	May 29, 2008
Opens with Misaki being told he is going to go back to living with Takahiro. Misaki believes that he has become a burden to Usagi, so he doesn't object. He goes to visit his brother in Osaka before Takahiro comes back to Tokyo. At his brother and sister-in-law's home he realizes this is what a normal family should feel like, but ends up getting mad when Takahiro starts criticizing Usagi. Misaki begins to notice he feels lonely. Usagi is at home and constantly thinking about Misaki. It is revealed that he let Misaki go because Takahiro said that Misaki blames himself for their parents deaths. Misaki asked them to hurry home and they sped home in the rain and crashed. Misaki does everything he can not to become a burden to anyone or to ask too much of them. Misaki phones Usagi from the train station but Usagi accidentally says something that upsets him. He tells Misaki to wait there and turns up 3 hours later. He drags Misaki onto a different train and tells him he won't ever let him go. Misaki is forced to decide what he actually wants to do, and says that he just doesn't want to cause trouble for Usagi. Usagi asks him to stay with him and Misaki says yes. They spend the night together in a private sleeper car. The next day Misaki sees that they are in Sapporo. Usagi says it is a birthday present for Misaki. The episode ends by revealing Usagi's small obsession with Marimo.
9	"One good turn deserves another" Transliteration: "Nasake wa Hito no Tame nara zu" (Japanese: 情けは人の為ならず)	June 5, 2008
This episode the backstory Hiroki and Akihiko friendship. They met in Hiroki's private hideaway on Akihiko's family estate when they were ten years old, and the two became classmates and friends. Akihiko spends a lot of time with Hiroki, and when Hiroki breaks down in tears due to all the pressure from the clubs he is in, Akihiko kisses him to calm him down. Afterward, Akihiko sleeps over at his house. Soon after, Hiroki is taken to Akihiko's house and it becomes clear that Akihiko does not have a very good relationship with his parents. In Akihiko's room, Hiroki sees some notepads filled with stories and ends up reading one of them. Akihiko comes back and tries to snatch the pad away from Hiroki, but Hiroki tells him it is really good and asks to read the rest. Akihiko agrees and the two form a pact that only Hiroki can read his stories. The episode ends with young Hiroki freaking out at the fact that he could be in love with Akihiko.
10	"Boys, be ambitious" Transliteration: "Shōnen yo Taishi o Idake" (Japanese: 少年よ大志を抱け)	June 12, 2008
The episode opens up with a love confession that teenager Takatsuki Shinobu makes to his ex-brother-in-law, Miyagi Yo. The episode flashes back to three years prior, when two thugs tried to mug Shinobu, and Miyagi ran them off. They both ended up at the same marriage arrangement meeting for Miyagi and Shinobu's sister, Risako. Back in the present day, it is revealed Miyagi has divorced Risako, and Shinobu returned from studying abroad when he heard the news. When Miyagi is asked to house Shinobu, the two form an uneasy relationship. Miyagi challenges Shinobu's earnest declaration of adoration by making a sexual advance, but the plan backfires when he realizes that the younger man is serious. He retreats to his office, but Shinobu finds him. Finally, Miyagi tells Shinobu to try hard in school, because people who are not serious do not interest him. In the Omake, Miyagi teases Hiroki about his homemade bentou (packed lunch) as Shinobu looks on.
11	"All things are easy that are done willingly" Transliteration: "Suki koso mono no Jōzu nare" (Japanese: 好きこそものの上手なれ)	June 19, 2008
Miyagi and Shinobu's story continues. As Miyagi walks to his car Risako arrives to get one last item, and comments that she felt Miyagi should have been more honest with her about his feelings. When she leaves he has a flashback of staying by someone's bedside and an empty wheelchair. His ruminations are interrupted by Shinobu's arrival home. Miyagi tries to make a hasty exit and in the process, drops a photo he'd been looking at. Shinobu presses him for details but Miyagi tells him to mind his own business. Shinobu once again declares his feelings, but Miyagi dismisses them. Shinobu then challenges Miyagi to sleep with him to show how serious he is. Miyagi makes an aggressive advance on Shinobu, but stops when Shinobu starts to cry. Shinobu leaves soon after. Driving home from work he reminisces about a teacher that he had loved, the woman in the picture. At home he finds Shinobu leaving, they talk and Shinobu reveals that he'd loved Miyagi even before they'd met during the attack. The next day, Shinobu's father calls and during the discussion it is revealed Shinobu is leaving to return to Australia. Miyagi rushes to stop him and gets there just in time.
12	"Even a chance acquaintance is preordained" Transliteration: "Sode Suri Au mo Tashō no En" (Japanese: 袖すり合うも他生の縁)	June 26, 2008
The episode opens with Misaki sprawled out on the floor, apparently thanks to Usami. To convince Takahiro to let Misaki stay with him, Usami has told outrageous lies, all of which Takahiro believes. The next day, Keiichi tells Misaki to congratulate Usami for winning the Kikukawa Prize, but Misaki worries suddenly it might be for one of the explicit BL books. When he gets home Usami, Isaka, and Aikawa talking about preparations for a celebration party. The manager mentions that Haruhiko, Usami's older brother will be present, which troubles Usami. The two adults rush Usami off to the press conference, leaving Misaki feeling a little hurt he hadn't known. He decides to do something for Usami when he is interrupted by a delivery of flowers from Usami's brother. Later that evening, Usami returns and Misaki expresses the sadness he feels from being excluded. Usami finds it charming and decides to take Misaki to bed. Things are changed slightly, when Misaki tries to take the initiative, but is too embarrassed. He'd gotten the idea because Usami previously said that his BL books were a mix of hobby, profit and fantasy. It gives Usami ideas and he gives Misaki the rest of the BL collection and tells him to study it, which embarrasses him further.

=== Season 2 ===
No.	Title	Original release date
1	"What happens once can happen twice" Transliteration: "Ichido aru koto wa Nido aru" (Japanese: 一度あることは二度ある)	October 12, 2008
Usagi doesn't want to attend an awards party for the Kikukawa Prize, but Isaka tricks him into it by saying Misaki wanted to go. On the way to the party at a hotel, Misaki runs into Usagi's older brother Haruhiko. He does not realise the relationship until they arrive at the hotel and Usagi and Isaka see them together. A confrontation between Usagi and his brother ensues and Misaki surprises everyone by losing his temper defending Usagi. Isaka explains to Haruhiko that Misaki is Usagi's special someone. Usagi is very happy that Misaki got so angry for him. The next day Misaki receives some flowers from Haruhiko which surprises and bothers both him and Usagi.
2	"What happens twice can happen thrice" Transliteration: "Nido aru koto wa Sando aru" (Japanese: 二度あることは三度ある)	October 19, 2008
After Misaki receives the flowers from Usagi's brother, Usagi confronts Misaki because he has never said that he loves him, but Misaki avoids the subject. While preparations for the party are being finished, Isaka takes Misaki aside and tells him not to let anyone know that he and Usagi are together to avoid any scandal. At the party Isaka makes sure that Misaki and Usagi are kept apart. When Misaki leaves the party to go to the bathroom, he runs into Usagi's brother. In Haruhiko's room, Misaki thanks him for the flowers but asks why he sent them. When Misaki goes to leave Haruhiko grabs his arm and says he is going to steal him away from Usagi and claims he loves Misaki. Misaki flees to his room and runs into Usagi. Usagi is angry when he hears what happened, and Misaki has to stop him from confronting his brother. The next day Misaki receives strawberries from Haruhiko.
3	"Third time's a charm" Transliteration: "Sando Me no Shōjiki" (Japanese: 三度目の正直)	October 26, 2008
Misaki is now receiving strawberries from Usagi's older brother everyday. Because of this Usagi has started to buy Misaki strawberry products everyday as well. Misaki can't stop Haruhiko sending him strawberries, as he has no way of getting in touch with him. When leaving the university the next day, Misaki runs into Haruhiko who was driving past hoping to see Misaki. Misaki wants to ask him to stop sending the strawberries but ends up being taken to Haruhiko's house. Usagi sees Misaki getting into Haruhiko's car. When they are at Haruhiko's house Misaki learns from the butler that Usagi and Haruhiko are half brothers, from different mothers. Haruhiko tries to persuade Misaki to stay at his house rather than return to Usagi, but locks Misaki in a storeroom when Usagi arrives at the house. Usagi is told that Misaki has already left but the dog leads him around to the side of the house where Misaki is attempting to escape from the room by climbing out of the window. He falls and sprains his ankle. Usagi then tells Haruhiko that he won't let him steal Misaki and kisses Misaki in front of him before leaving. Misaki ends up being carried piggy back style to the house while thinking "I just kept thinking that I needed to get back to Usagi ..."
4	"The mouth is the gate of misfortune" Transliteration: "Kuchi wa Wazawai no Moto" (Japanese: 口は災いの元)	November 2, 2008
Nowaki is feeling insecure about his relationship with Hiro and he wants Hiro to be more proactive. Nowaki is not even sure whether Hiro likes living with him. While he is thinking about this, Hiro calls and asks Nowaki to bring some materials to him at the university. At the gates Miyagi turns up and teases Hiro, calling him Hiroki, which annoys Hiro. Nowaki asks Hiro if he can call him Hiroki, thinking it is something special, but Hiro says no, and Nowaki is hurt by this. Hiro meets Nowaki at work the next morning and while they are walking Akihiko pulls up in his car. He calls Hiro Hiroki which annoys Nowaki and he drags Hiro away. Later back in their apartment it is revealed that Nowaki still feels insecure about the gap between him and Hiro. Hiro tells him that it doesn't matter and he could never let Nowaki catch up to him anyway, because his pride would not let him. Hiro also tells Nowaki he loves him. Whilst they are making up Nowaki realises that the reason Hiro has not been more proactive with their relationship is that he is shy. Hiro also points out that he has a very special name that only one person calls him: Hiro-san.
5	"Many a true word is spoken in jest" Transliteration: "Uso kara Deta Makoto" (Japanese: 嘘から出た実)	November 9, 2008
Since spraining his ankle, Misaki feels smothered by Usagi. Misaki wants to help his friend Sumi at the college festival but Usagi forbids it. This leads to a confrontation between Usagi and Misaki. Usagi tells Misaki that Sumi is after him, which Misaki doesn't believe, and Misaki says some harsh things. After their confrontation, things between Misaki and Usagi are very strained. Misaki helps out at the festival and afterwards goes back to Sumi's as it is already quite late. After Misaki has fallen asleep, Sumi calls Usagi and tells him Misaki is there. Usagi turns up and receives a confession of love from Sumi. Sumi says this is why he got close to Misaki, and then twists Misaki's words to sound as if Misaki doesn't like Usagi. Misaki suddenly bursts into the room, having heard everything, and pulls Usagi away from Sumi while stating that Usagi is his. Usagi tells Sumi he doesn't love him, and he and Misaki leave. Back at their flat Usagi tells Misaki that he loves him and he is never going to let him go.
6	"A picture is worth a thousand words" Transliteration: "Hyakubun wa Ikken ni Shikazu" (Japanese: 百聞は一見に如かず)	November 16, 2008
The episode starts with Hiroki discovering Nowaki asleep half-naked on his apartment floor with Tsumori, Nowaki's senpai from the hospital where he works (also half-naked). While Nowaki is trying to explain to Hiroki that nothing is going on, the latter is paged to the hospital and tells Nowaki that he is needed as well. Nowaki is out of the door when Tsumori walks back into the apartment to collect the watch that he left inside. There, he informs Hiroki that Nowaki has plans of moving out 'sometime soon'. Hiroki is surprised, and after thinking about it, concludes that Nowaki was tiring of him. At the university, Miyagi explains that he will end his own relationship when Shinobu doesn't need an old man anymore. Hiroki again ponders Nowaki's recent behaviour, thinking that their relationship will end soon. He goes to the hospital to bring Nowaki his bag from home. Tsumori purposely hugs Nowaki to make Hiroki jealous. Infuriated, Hiroki smashes Tsumori to the floor and rushes out. Nowaki follows him, and then asks Hiroki to move in with him into the new house, which was meant to be a surprise. Nowaki again reminds Hiroki how much he loves him, then kisses him, while Hiroki keeps on repeating the same confession in his head over and over again.
7	"Life often brings misfortune in times of great happiness" Transliteration: "Tsuki ni Murakumo Hana ni Kaze" (Japanese: 月に叢雲花に風)	November 23, 2008
Misaki is making breakfast, and complaining about Usagi's toys spread out around the house. Usagi says to him that "maybe it's best for you to live on your own", confusing Misaki. At the train station, Misaki meets an old man that doesn't seem to have ridden a train before. Misaki offers to walk with him. When they are on the train, the old man notices that Misaki has a wooden carved bear with three salmon. Misaki says that he can have it because he has two more at home. The old man gives Misaki a ducky (for the bathtub), and said that he has plenty more ducks at home because he wants to build up his relationship with his son. When they have arrived, the old man gets a phone call from his company that a car is waiting for him. Then they meet Usagi's brother and Misaki learns that the old man is Usagi's father. When Misaki comes home, Usagi hurts his finger by pouring coffee into a mug that is not heat resistant, shattering it. Usagi heads back to his work room and Misaki debates telling him that he met his father, but cannot do it. Making an excuse to stay in Usagi's room, Misaki tells Usagi that he has been acting weird lately and asks if he has something to say. Both of them stay quiet and Misaki thinks about what Usagi's father said and that he has not actually said, even once, that he loves Usagi. Usagi leaves, but Misaki stops him and tried to say "I love you" but fails as tears pour down his face. Usagi tells him that his attempt really makes him happy and suddenly carries him to their bedroom, because he "understood his true feelings". He tosses him next to the room and tells Misaki to lick his finger to smoothen the scar. They kiss and Usagi says in a whisper again and again that he loves him.
8	"Love does not follow logic" Transliteration: "Koi wa Shian no Hoka" (Japanese: 恋は思案の外)	November 29, 2008
An anxious Miyagi lying on his sofa ponders the complete absence of Shinobu-chin. Miyagi then starts questioning Shinobu's sincerity about their relationship. Miyagi attempts to reassure himself with the fact that he is the one who is being chased, but fails with the realization that he is at the mercy of the teenage boy. Miyagi tries to call Shinobu, but Miyagi's ex-wife answers. After a short conversation, Miyagi finally realizes the issues troubling Shinobu. Miyagi searches through his calendar for an appropriate day to confront Shinobu, only to find a particular date circled. At first, Miyagi questions the significance of the date, then suddenly realizes that the date circled was one he would normally never forget: the date of death of the woman he loved years ago. Several days later, Miyagi drives to Shinobu's school only to find him with a foreigner. At the sight of Miyagi, Shinobu grabs the foreigner's hand and runs in the opposite direction. Miyagi chases Shinobu with his car and, at the peak of his anger, plays a scenario in his mind of what their supposed break up will be like. Wearing a disguise, Miyagi manages to confront Shinobu, and learns Shinobu's side of the story. Miyagi realizes how insecure Shinobu became upon discovering that the only object Miyagi truly cherishes is a photo of him and his past love. Miyagi throws Shinobu into his car, and after a long drive, they end up at the grave of Miyagi's former love. There, Miyagi confesses his love for Shinobu and requests forgiveness, as he will finally let go of his past love.
9	"Out of the frying pan, into the fire" Transliteration: "Ichinan Satte mata Ichinan" (Japanese: 一難去ってまた一難)	December 6, 2008
Aikawa is having a fit because Usagi can't complete his latest manuscript since he has no idea what a "normal" date for a college student would be. She tells him that renting a room at a five-star hotel is not a normal date, then laments about finding a normal college student to teach him what a normal date is like. She asks Misaki to take Usagi on a date and show him what it is like. Misaki reluctantly agrees. A package from Usagi's father arrives--a wooden carving of a bear with four salmon--and Misaki is forced to reveal that he had recently met with both Usagi's father and Usagi's brother. Usagi is deeply upset by this, but refuses to say why. The two go on their date, eating at a diner and heading to a newly renovated aquarium where Misaki again runs into Usagi's brother when he goes to the bathroom. Misaki tells Usagi's brother to try and mend his relationship with his well-meaning father, then is subjected to yet another love confession. He tries to get away, but is spotted by Usagi. The two end their date on a ferris wheel where Usagi reveals that he is afraid that if Misaki continues to run into his family, they will reveal things about Usagi that Misaki has never seen. He worries that finding out about these things will make Misaki hate him and leave him, and he would rather Misaki leave now than come to hate him later. Misaki tells Usagi that he would never do that because he loves him. The two reconcile, then head to a hotel and shower together. Later, Misaki expresses embarrassment over saying "I love you" so easily, but feels that it was worth it if it made Usagi feel better. Then he discovers that Usagi-san used it as material for yet another BL novel but still hasn't finished the novel he was supposed to be writing ...
10	"Marriage is made in heaven" Transliteration: "En wa I na Mono" (Japanese: 縁は異なもの)	December 13, 2008
Misaki sees on television that Usagi's brother is getting married. A girl knocks at the door and asks Usagi to marry her. The girl is Kaoruko, Usagi's cousin, and Usagi's father is trying to force her to marry Usagi's brother. Usagi refuses to marry her but Misaki coaxes him to allow her to stay until she can figure out what to do. While Usagi is out buying cigarettes Usagi's brother rings the doorbell looking for Kaoruko. To distract him, Misaki agrees to go for a drive with him to protect Kaoruko, and asks Kaoruko to tell Usagi that he will be back in 3 hours. In the car Usagi's brother tells Misaki that he will not marry Kaoruko. He also talks about his difficult childhood and how it has always made him seek the approval of others, and how his real dream is to be an architect. Misaki realises that Usagi's brother isn't such a bad guy. Misaki gets out of the car and runs straight into Usagi's father, who tells him that his existence is a problem and a threat to the stability of his family. Misaki is shocked and hurt, and rushes home to Usagi because he promised he'd be back in 3 hours. Usagi can see that Misaki is upset, but Misaki pretends he's fine and won't reveal what Usagi's father said because he doesn't want to cause trouble. That night in bed Usagi begs Misaki to talk to him, to tell him what's bothering him, because he's worried. Misaki won't talk about it and promises himself that he will disguise his feelings better in the future. The next day, Kaoruko admits that she likes Misaki, which makes him proud that finally a girl likes him.
11	"Hate the sin, not the sinner" Transliteration: "Sono Tsumi wo Nikunde Sono Hito wo Nikumazu" (Japanese: 其の罪を憎んで其の人を憎まず)	December 20, 2008
Misaki starts the new year with a dilemma – he has received invitations to various events from all three Usagi men on the same day. He agrees to go with Usagi to a hot spring resort. Usagi is notified that a family meeting will be held to discuss dispersal of an inheritance. Usagi says he doesn't want any money but Misaki coaxes him to go to the meeting on the way to the hot spring. Usagi briefly attends the meeting, then runs out and tells Misaki that he forgot to finish the manuscript he was working on. At the hot spring Usagi tells Misaki that he refused the inheritance of 1.3 billion yen (~$14 million). While Usagi works on a manuscript Misaki soaks in the hot spring, and he runs into Usagi's father. Usagi's father asks Misaki some questions about his relationship with Usagi, expressing surprise that they get along. Usagi's father describes Usagi as emotionally fragile. Because he wants his son to be happy, he doesn't want Misaki to stay with Usagi if his feelings are half-hearted. Misaki passes out in the tub, but when he awakens he tells Usagi what happened and Usagi says everything is fine. When Usagi disappears for a long time to buy cigarettes Misaki goes looking for him and finds him talking to his father. He eavesdrops and hears Usagi's father say that Misaki will one day become a burden to him. Misaki confronts them and says there is nothing half-hearted about his feelings. Usagi tells his father that Misaki's influence in his life has made his writing more kind and gentle. Alone in a hot bath Usagi reassures Misaki that he loves him, that he will never let him go, and that no one else's opinions matter. The episode ends with Aikawa calling in a frenzy because Usagi has still not completed his manuscript.
12	"All's well that ends well" Transliteration: "Owari Yokereba Subete Yoshi" (Japanese: 終り良ければ全て良し)	December 27, 2008
Misaki delivers a manuscript to Usagi at his publisher's office. Isaka introduces Misaki to one of his favourite manga artists. Misaki's outpouring of adoration helps the author overcome his writer's block. Usagi overhears Misaki and gets jealous. He tells Misaki that he shouldn't confess love for other men. Usagi is pulled away to a meeting, but directs Misaki to go straight home. Before Misaki has a chance to get away, Isaka throws him in a room alone with Usagi's brother. Usagi's brother tells Misaki that he is taking over the architectural businesses of the Usami group, because of their conversation in episode 10 (season 2). He expresses his need and love for Misaki, then pins Misaki to the tabletop and tries to kiss him. Isaka, outside guarding the door, stops Usagi from entering the room. He says this should be a test for Misaki, to see if he will reject Usagi's brother without being rescued. Inside, Misaki pushes Usagi's brother away and admits that he loves Usagi. Back at home Usagi tries to get Misaki to promise never to leave him, but Misaki is evasive. Misaki runs into Usagi's father outside Usagi's house and invites him in. Usagi's father presents Usagi with photos of potential brides and asks Misaki to reject Usagi. Usagi tells his father he can't live without Misaki. Usagi and Misaki leave, and Usagi's father pursues them. Misaki saves Usagi from getting hit by a bus then yells at him for doing something so stupid. He yells at Usagi's father as well. Usagi's father realizes that Misaki can stand up to Usagi, and that earns him respect and acceptance.

=== Season 3 ===
No.	Title	Original release date
1	"All Good Things Must Come to an End"; Transliteration: "Hana ni Arashi" (Japanese: 花に嵐)	July 8, 2015
Misaki Takahashi has been living with his secret boyfriend, the rich and famous boys-love author Akihiko Usami, for three years now. He thinks nothing's changed between them or inside his own heart in that time, but is he just fooling himself? Misaki meets a boy in the university named Todo who is like Misaki as he also loves Ijuuin's work: theKan. Akihiko's cousin comes over from America and hates Misaki at first sight?
2	"Failing to Plan Is Planning to Fail"; Transliteration: "Enryōnakereba Kin'Yū Ari" (Japanese: 遠慮なければ近憂あり)	July 15, 2015
Misaki is having trouble deciding on a career, and Usagi is feeling maybe just a teeny-tiny bit insecure about the future.
3	"Looking for Hen's Teeth"; Transliteration: "Mouki no Fuboku" (Japanese: 盲亀の浮木)	July 22, 2015
Misaki and Todo get autographs from their idol. Ijuuin tells Misaki to bring Todo and come visit him sometime. Kaoruko and Mizuki get their feelings out in the open, and fly home. Usagi mainly just gets a foreboding of doom.
4	"Where There's a Will, There's a Way"; Transliteration: "Ishi ni Tatsuya" (Japanese: 石に立つ矢)	July 29, 2015
Hearing from his friends that repeating dish for meal by lover can be boring, Shinobu decides to switch from cooking cabbages to pumpkins but runs into a big trouble when he realizes that he neither likes nor can prepare the dish. He received an unexpected help from his sister Risako who comes to return some DVDs to Miyagi. Shinobu learns of his sister's recent break up with her latest boyfriend and her consideration of reconciling with Miyagi which frustrates him. When Miyagi returned, Shinobu forces Risako to leave and accused Miyagi of giving him a virus that caused him to fall madly in love with him and asks for the cure. However, Miyagi replies that even he has it he won't give it since he is very grateful for all the love that he received. The second segment focuses on Miyagi trying to take Shinobu out for a date only to fall sick. He eventually realized that the place that Shinobu wants to go is anywhere as long as they are together and invites him to move in.
5	"Even the Longest Journey Begins with a Single Step"; Transliteration: "Senri no Michi mo Ippo Kara" (Japanese: 千里の道も一歩から)	August 5, 2015
With his applications taken care of, Misaki now has to face the dreaded interview process. After a mock interview with Usagi and talking with Aiko, Misaki interviews with Marukawa Books. He believes he did poorly, and ponders searching for other jobs. After saying some hurtful things to Usagi, as he is in a bad mood, Misaki apologizes, and later receives a letter from Marukawa Books saying he got the job.
6	"A Bolt from the Blue"; Transliteration: "Seiten no Hekireki" (Japanese: 青天の霹靂)	August 12, 2015
Misaki's phone is ringing off the hook as people congratulate him on getting hired. Usagi is dealing with this in a calm and rational manner. Usagi gets Misaki drunk by having him drink wine and 'kidnapped' him to an Usami vacation home which has no mobile service.
7	"The Darkest Place is Under the Candlestick"; Transliteration: "Toudai Moto Kurashi" (Japanese: 灯台下暗し)	August 19, 2015
Ryuichiro Isaka, president of Marukawa Books, has been together with Kaoru Asahina forever. But that doesn't make him a mind-reader and Asahina's unique communication style or lack thereof tends to have him fearing the worst. Note: Ritsu Onodera and Masamune Takano from the spin-off Sekai-ichi Hatsukoi made a cameo appearance in this episode.
8	"A Jealousy Too Hot May Burn a Man"; Transliteration: "Yakimochi Yakutomo Te wo Yakuna" (Japanese: 焼き餅焼くとも手を焼くな)	August 26, 2015
Misaki has to run an errand for his part-time job: bring Mr. Ijuin his lunch in his condo. Usagi gets very jealous once he finds out Misaki went to the manga author's place and tries to hear Misaki out, though his jealousy eventually seems to bother Misaki.
9	"A Battle of Irreconcilable Enemies"; Transliteration: "Suika no Arasoi" (Japanese: 水火の争い)	September 2, 2015
Akihiko and Ijuuin have their interview for Marukawa. In an effort to escape the crowds afterwards, Ijuuin pulls Akihiko and Misaki into an unused room. Misaki leaves the two to find drinks for them while they wait and Ijuuin tells Akihiko that he is in fact in love with Misaki.
10	"Hours Are Like Days to Lovers Parted"; Transliteration: "Nuitai ga Jō, Mitai ga Yamai" (Japanese: 縫いたいが情、見たいが病)	September 9, 2015
It is Nowaki's birthday and Hiroki reserves a table at a restaurant to celebrate. Nowaki, however, has an influx of work at the hospital and has to cancel. He's delivered to Kamijo, out cold, by Tsumori who also informs him that Nowaki had been distracted all day because of their canceled plans and tells Hiroki to be less of a burden on him. Hiroki is later assured by a half-asleep Nowaki. The second half takes place and unspecified amount of time later, wherein Nowaki is worried over the lack of time he and Hiroki get to spend together due to their conflicting schedules and because of a marriage offer sent to Hiroki.
11	"Labor for Love"; Transliteration: "Koi ni wa Mi wo Yatsuse" (Japanese: 恋には身をやつせ)	September 16, 2015
Akihiko is acting strange and Misaki is worried. He suspects something must have gone on between Akihiko and Ijuuin during their interview, but when he asks Akihiko he gets no answers. He decides to avoid Ijuuin for the time being, but at the pressuring of both Ijuuin and his boss, he and Todo visit him on Ijuuin's day off and, after Todo leaves, Ijuuin confesses to Misaki. Misaki does not get the chance to form a proper response before Akihiko shows up and pulls him away.
12	"True Love is Fate"; Transliteration: "Koiji wa En no Mono" (Japanese: 恋路は縁のもの)	September 23, 2015
Akihiko has big plans to take Misaki on a vacation for the boy's upcoming 22nd birthday, but is informed that on the exact same day he'll be receiving a prestigious literature award and must be present. Misaki is adamant on making him go so Akihiko makes arrangements for them to go after its over. Akihiko leaves the event sooner than permitted and they immediately leave for Kamakura, where they buy marbles at a shop and at a nearby diner Misaki tells Akihiko about how he and Takahiro used to make wishes on marbles. While heading to the restroom Misaki receives a call from Ijuuin and rushes outside to answer, only to find the manga artist standing right there, having come to Kamakura to take reference pictures but also, having known Misaki was there as well, intended to set up a date. He confesses again to Misaki who, with Akihiko standing nearby, unnoticed, manages to turn him down.
