= Hybrid Child =

Japanese manga by Shungiku Nakamura

- Cover of the first volume of the manga featuring Hazuki (left) and Kotarō (right)
- Genre: Yaoi
- Manga
- Written by: Shungiku Nakamura
- Published by: Seiji Biblos (2005); Kadokawa Shoten (2008)
- English publisher: NA: Digital Manga Publishing
- Magazine: Be x Boy GOLD
- Published: March 10, 2005 (Seiji Biblos); July 30, 2008 (Kadokawa Shoten)
- Volumes: 1
- Original video animation
- Directed by: Michio Fukuda
- Written by: Aki Itami
- Music by: Hijiri Anze
- Studio: Studio Deen
- Released: October 29, 2014 – January 28, 2015
- Runtime: 25 minutes
- Episodes: 4

Hybrid Child is a one-shot Japanese manga written and illustrated by Shungiku Nakamura; the creator of Junjou Romantica and Sekaichi Hatsukoi. It is licensed in North America by Digital Manga Publishing, which released the manga through its imprint, June, on August 16, 2006. A drama CD was released by Marine Entertainment in 2005. An OVA adaptation of the manga was announced as being in development in 2011, and the first of four OVAs released in 2014.

== Premise ==
The Hybrid Child is an android that can grow if it is lavished with enough love and care from its owner. Neither fully machine nor fully human, the various Hybrid Child models develop strong emotional bonds with their owners. This volume contains several short stories: Young Kotaro learns the importance of responsibility when his Hybrid Child's lifespan runs out. The tragic swordsman Seya learns to love again with the help of his Hybrid child, Yuzu. The final story tells of Kuroda, the creator of the Hybrid Child designs, and how his lost love inspired their creation.

== Characters ==
Kotarō Izumi (和泉 小太郎, Izumi Kotarō)
Voiced by: Jun Fukuyama (Drama CD), Nobuhiko Okamoto, Megumi Iwasaki (childhood) (OVA)
Kotarou Izumi is the 16th head of the Izumi household, which is the noblest household. When he was 8 years old, he found an abandoned Hybrid Child at the garbage dump and named it Hazuki. The Izumi family tried to dispose of Hazuki a total of 3 times, forcing him to buy a new one instead. Kotaro brought him home each time saying: "It has to be Hazuki." According to Hazuki, Kotaro is unreliable, although he is the heir of the family. He often fails exams and finds excuses to avoid studying. He also feels it is unjust that Hazuki grew up to be taller than he is.
Hazuki (葉月)
Voiced by: Kōsuke Toriumi (Drama CD), Daisuke Hirakawa, Mahiru Konno (childhood) (OVA)
Besides being Kotaro's Hybrid Child, Hazuki acts as his tutor and butler at the same time. He feels he might be spoiling Kotaro too much, but ultimately he wants to groom Kotaro into a proper family head. According to Kotaro, he gets irritated too easily. Despite his somewhat strict attitude, he can feel embarrassed, as shown when Kotaro asks him to strip. He sports a black suit with a white Victorian tie underneath and has a function that regulates his body temperature, which allows him to withstand the hot summer weather, even though he wears the suit. Kuroda discovers that Hazuki is the Hybrid Child with the serial number 0001, which is the antique first model. His skin transformed almost into that of a human's, and his joints have disappeared. It is implied that Hazuki is the first Hybrid Child to have grown the furthest.
Yuzu (ゆず)
Voiced by: Kōki Miyata (Drama CD), Tsubasa Yonaga (OVA)
Ichi Seya (瀬谷 壱, Seya Ichi)
Voiced by: Junichi Suwabe (Drama CD), Ryōhei Kimura, Haruka Kimura (childhood) (OVA)
Tsukishima (月島)
Voiced by: Hikaru Midorikawa (Drama CD), Yoshitsugu Matsuoka, Nozomi Masu (childhood) (OVA)
Tsukishima is one of the central characters in volume 3 of Hybrid Child. He is a childhood friend of Kuroda and Ichi Seya, and later becomes a minister of the Rebel Clan. Tsukishima has long light brown hair, typically tied back in a ponytail, and soft light green eyes. Compared to Kuroda and Seya, he is shorter in stature, a result of being physically weak and sickly as a child. Despite this, he grows more toned and slender as an adult. Due to his frail health in childhood, Tsukishima was often kept from playing with other children, spending his time observing from a distance. It was Kuroda who first reached out to him, forming the basis of the close bond shared by the trio. Tsukishima is gentle in demeanor but carries a quiet strength beneath his reserved exterior. Though he often exchanged sharp remarks with Kuroda, there was a clear closeness between them, laced with familiarity and unresolved feelings. As an adult, he takes on a more serious and composed presence, shaped by duty and circumstance. His loyalty to his clan, and his bond with Kuroda, remain central to his character. Despite his internal doubts, Tsukishima stands firm when it matters most, even in the face of devastating decisions. His relationship with Kuroda is revealed to hold deep emotional weight, forming the heart of his story.
Kuroda (黒田)
Voiced by: Kazuhiko Inoue (Drama CD), Yūki Ono, Risa Hayamizu (childhood) (OVA) Kuroda is the creator of the androids known as Hybrid Child. He is a tall man with medium-length black hair, which he wore in a ponytail during his youth but now leaves down. Slim yet fairly muscular, he is typically seen in a dark blue robe with bandages around his arms and neck—the one on his neck believed to be Tsukishima's headband. In his younger days, Kuroda had a stubborn personality, but as he grew older, he developed a teasing nature, though he still shows care toward those close to him. He was childhood friends with Tsukishima and Ichi Seya, and the three shared a close bond. After Tsukishima's death, Kuroda was left heartbroken. He remained in love with him even after his passing. His first Hybrid Child prototype bore a striking resemblance to a young Tsukishima, subtly revealing the emotional weight he carried. It is implied that before Tsukishima's death, the two had confessed their feelings and shared an intimate night together. Kuroda came to terms with his emotions when the prototype mimicked Tsukishima's old habit of offering a Sakura branch. Despite the past, Kuroda and Seya remain good friends.

== Media ==
=== Manga ===
Written by Shungiku Nakamura, Hybrid Child was serialized in BiBLOS' BE×BOY GOLD (later moved to Kadokawa's Asuka Ciel) from 2003 to 2004, then compiled in one volume Tankobon by Kadokawa Shoten in 2008.

Unlike Nakamura's longer works, Hybrid Child is composed of three separate stories—each featuring different characters—but all exploring the same central concept of artificial life and emotional growth. The manga blends romance, tragedy, and speculative elements, setting it apart in tone from her more lighthearted series.

Hybrid Child received international attention following the popularity of Nakamura's other works. The manga was licensed for English-language release in North America by Digital Manga Publishing under its June imprint. The English edition was published on August 16, 2006.

Unlike Nakamura's longer works, Hybrid Child is composed of three separate stories—each featuring different characters—but all exploring the same central concept of artificial life and emotional growth. The manga blends romance, tragedy, and speculative elements, setting it apart in tone from her more lighthearted series.

=== Anime ===
Hybrid Child received an anime adaptation produced by Studio Deen. The project was announced in early 2011 and later confirmed to be a four-episode OVA series based on the original manga by Shungiku Nakamura. The first episode was released on October 29, 2014, with subsequent episodes released periodically, concluding on January 28, 2015. Unlike Nakamura's other works, Hybrid Child features a more melancholic and reflective tone, blending emotional storytelling with soft science fiction elements. The anime was later made available for international streaming with subtitles, though no official English dub has been produced.
