= The World's Greatest First Love: The Case of Takafumi Yokozawa =

2014 film by Chiaki Kon

- Japanese: 劇場版 世界一初恋 横澤隆史の場合
- Revised Hepburn: Gekijōban Sekai-ichi Hatsukoi: Yokozawa Takafumi no Bāi
- Directed by: Chiaki Kon
- Screenplay by: Chiaki Kon
- Based on: The World's Greatest First Love by Shungiku Nakamura
- Starring: Kenyu Horiuchi; Noboru Sōgetsu
- Cinematography: Shinya Kondo
- Edited by: Masahiro Matsumura
- Music by: Hijiri Anze
- Production company: Studio Deen
- Distributed by: Kadokawa
- Release date: March 15, 2014
- Running time: 50 minutes
- Country: Japan
- Language: Japanese

The World's Greatest First Love: The Case of Takafumi Yokozawa (Note: Japanese: 劇場版 世界一初恋 横澤隆史の場合, Hepburn: Gekijōban Sekai-ichi Hatsukoi: Yokozawa Takafumi no Bāi; lit. "Theatrical Feature The World's Greatest First Love: The Case of Takafumi Yokozawa") is a 2014 Japanese animated romantic-comedy film written and directed by Chiaki Kon; the film is based on a light novel with the same name from The World's Greatest First Love manga series by Shungiku Nakamura. Produced by Studio Deen and distributed by Kadokawa, the film stars the voices of Kenyu Horiuchi and Noboru Sōgetsu. The Case of Takafumi Yokozawa was released in Japan on March 15, 2014.

The film was licensed by Funimation and streamed on its website on September 21, 2021.

== Plot ==
Takafumi Yokozawa wakes up in a stranger's house. He can only recall what happened the night before once he sees his co-worker, Zen Kirishima, coming out of the shower. After learning that Kirishima had paid his bar tab the night before and had some type of blackmail photo of him, Yokozawa resigns to becoming Kirishima's servant per his request.

After learning about Kirishima's past and his job as a single father, Yokozawa attempts to come to terms with his broken heart. After confessing their feelings to each other, Yokozawa and Kirishima decide how they will spend Valentine's Day.

== Voice cast ==
- Kenyu Horiuchi as Takafumi Yokozawa
- Noboru Sōgetsu as Zen Kirishima
- Yui Horie as Hiyori Kirishima
- Takashi Kondō as Ritsu Onodera
- Katsuyuki Konishi as Masamune Takano
- Shinnosuke Tachibana as Chiaki Yoshino
- Yuichi Nakamura as Yoshiyuki Hatori

== Production ==
In September 2012, it was announced that The World's Greatest First Love anime series was receiving a film adaptation, based on The Case of Takafumi Yokozawa light novel. On the following year, it was announced that series director Chiaki Kon will direct the film at Studio Deen, with Yoko Kikuchi designing the characters for the film.

== Release ==
The film was released in theaters in Japan on March 15, 2014. The film was later re-released in Japan on October 22, 2017. Funimation licensed the film, and was released in the United States on its website on September 21, 2021.
