= Junjo Romantica: Pure Romance =

Japanese manga series by Shungiku Nakamura

- First tankōbon volume cover, featuring Misaki Takahashi and Akihiko Usami

純情ロマンチカ (Junjō Romanchika)
- Genre: Boys' love
- Manga
- Written by: Shungiku Nakamura
- Published by: Kadokawa Shoten
- English publisher: NA: Blu Manga
- Magazine: Asuka Ciel (2002–2014); Emerald (2014–present)
- Original run: April 30, 2002 – present
- Volumes: 31
- Anime television series
- Directed by: Chiaki Kon
- Music by: MOKA☆
- Studio: Studio Deen
- Licensed by: Crunchyroll: UK: Anime Limited
- Original network: TV Hokkaido
- Original run: April 10, 2008 – June 26, 2008
- Episodes: 12
- Anime television series

Junjo Romantica 2
- Directed by: Chiaki Kon
- Music by: MOKA☆
- Studio: Studio Deen
- Licensed by: Crunchyroll: UK: Anime Limited
- Original network: TV Hokkaido
- Original run: October 12, 2008 – December 27, 2008
- Episodes: 12
- Original video animation
- Directed by: Chiaki Kon
- Studio: Studio Deen
- Released: December 20, 2012
- Runtime: 25 minutes
- Anime television series

Junjo Romantica 3
- Directed by: Chiaki Kon
- Music by: MOKA☆
- Studio: Studio Deen
- Licensed by: Crunchyroll: UK: Anime Limited
- Original network: Tokyo MX, SUN TV, AT-X, tvk, Chiba TV, TVS, Gifu TV, BS11, TVQ
- Original run: July 8, 2015 – September 23, 2015
- Episodes: 12

Junjo Romantica: Pure Romance (Japanese: 純情ロマンチカ, Hepburn: Junjō Romanchika; lit. 'Pure-Hearted Romantica') is a Japanese boys' love manga series by Shungiku Nakamura. It focuses on four storylines: the main couple, which comprises the bulk of the books, and three other male couples that provide ongoing side stories ("Junjo Egoist", "Junjo Terrorist", and "Junjo Mistake"). It has expanded into several CD-dramas, a manga series running in Asuka Ciel, a light novel series titled "Junai Romantica" running in The Ruby magazine, and a 37-episode anime series.

Shungiku Nakamura has written a spin-off of Junjo Romantica titled Sekai-ichi Hatsukoi (lit. 'The World's Greatest First Love') focusing on a shōjo manga editor and his first love, which was also animated by Studio Deen in 2011.

== Characters ==
=== Junjo Romantica ===
Misaki Takahashi (高橋 美咲, Takahashi Misaki)
Voiced by Takahiro Sakurai
Misaki Takahashi (the uke of the Romantica couple) is Takahiro's younger brother. He is eighteen years old at the start of the series, nineteen in episode eight of the anime, and twenty-one in the third season. He is a textbook tsundere. At the start of the series, Misaki is about to take his college entrance exams. He aspires to attend Mitsuhashi University, the college his brother turned down in order to care for him after their parents died. Although he seems childish and brash, he simply does not want to cause trouble for anyone else. This is because he still blames himself for his parents' deaths; he thinks that if he had not asked them to hurry home that day, they wouldn't have had the accident.
After failing all his practice exams, Misaki's only choice is to ask Usagi to tutor him. This professional relationship gradually evolves into a romantic one. Because Misaki has an idealistic view of relationships, he is reluctant to admit his feelings for Usagi. Even after the two move in together, many challenges come their way. With his so-called "Usa-mones", Misaki ends up attracting several of the Usami men, including Usagi's half-brother, Haruhiko, and his father, Fuyuhiko. Misaki, now a grad student at Mitsuhashi, got accepted into Marukawa after several interviews.
Akihiko Usami (宇佐見 秋彦, Usami Akihiko)
Voiced by Hikaru Hanada and Rina Sato (child)
Akihiko is twenty-eight at the beginning of the series, and he has turned thirty-one by the third season. The seme to Misaki's uke, he is a prolific author of fiction and BL novels, not to mention the youngest recipient of the distinguished Naomori Award. His nickname is "Usagi" (rabbit in Japanese). Usagi is a close friend of Misaki's older brother, Takahiro, and secretly has feelings for him. Not long after meeting Misaki, he discovers Takahiro is engaged. Misaki gets upset on Usagi's behalf, which leads Usagi to realize his true feelings—he is actually in love with Misaki, not Takahiro. Once Takahiro moves away, Misaki and Usagi move in together, and go from roommates to lovers.
Usagi has a cameo in the first episode of the Junjo Romantica spin-off Sekai-ichi Hatsukoi. Ritsu Onodera, the central protagonist of that series, was Usagi's editor prior to transferring to Marukawa.
Haruhiko Usami (宇佐見 春彦, Usami Haruhiko)
Voiced by Kōsuke Toriumi (adult)
Haruhiko Usami is Akihiko's 30-year-old half-brother (they have different mothers). Misaki calls him "Big Brother Usagi". He is generally cold and disapproving towards his brother, though no one really knows why. After a brief appearance in the middle of the series, he begins proclaiming that he "loves" Misaki, but that was only after he found out how close he and Akihiko were. When he begins sending Misaki flowers and saying that he would take Misaki as his own, Akihiko claims that Haruhiko was "always trying to take [his] things."
Takahiro Takahashi (高橋 孝浩, Takahashi Takahiro)
Voiced by Kishō Taniyama
Takahiro is Misaki's 28-year-old brother and Usagi's long-time friend. He was the subject of Akihiko's affections for a long time, though he never seemed to notice as he is shown to be extremely naive. He is extremely caring towards his younger brother, who refers to him as "Niichan", even dropping out of school to raise Misaki after their parents died. Early in the series, he becomes engaged to and marries Kajiwara Manami. They soon move to Osaka due to his job, at which time Misaki goes to live with Usagi. He now has a son named Mahiro in season three, he and Misaki dote on him a lot, but Usagi does not like him because he is not comfortable with creatures ruled by instinct.
Keiichi Sumi (角 圭一, Sumi Keiichi)
Voiced by Isshin Chiba
A senior college student at Mitsuhashi University and Misaki's friend, Keiichi Sumi is a very mysterious young man; while it is usually hard to tell whether he is being serious or not, he is not viewed as a bad person. The son of famous novelist Ryouichi Sumi, Keiichi is also a member of the university's Onsen Research Group (ORG) which have been known for generations as makers of Japan's most terrifying haunted house. He is first introduced trying to lure Misaki away from Akihiko, fueling Akihiko to intervene. Afterwards, once Akihiko and Misaki admit their feelings for one another, Keiichi frequently creates problems between the two, suggesting to Misaki at one point that there might be something between Akihiko and Aikawa (as she had a key to his apartment). He later reveals that he was merely using Misaki to get closer to his true object of affections, Akihiko. Despite this, the two remain close friends, showing that he does care for Misaki. He graduated in season 3 and got a job in a video company, he was aiming for a publishing company but he did not get in.
Eri Aikawa (相川 絵理, Aikawa Eri)
Voiced by Noriko Namiki
Eri Aikawa is Akihiko's editor, for both his fiction works and BL novels, as well as a friend to both him and Misaki. She is roughly the same age as Akihiko and is constantly pushing him to finish his work on time. On the exterior, she seems like a kind and nice-mannered person, but when Akihiko does not hand in his manuscripts on time, she is famous for freaking out and even, on one occasion, attacking him. A fan of Akihiko's work, as Misaki notes that Aikawa sometimes acts like a fan girl when she is around Akihiko and Misaki; in fact, Akihiko reveals that many scenes from his novels are Aikawa's own personal requests, a fact that seemed to surprise Misaki.
Fuyuhiko Usami (宇佐見 冬彦, Usami Fuyuhiko)
Voiced by Jūrōta Kosugi
The father of Akihiko ("Usagi") and Haruhiko, as well as uncle to Kaoruko, Misaki calls him "Papa Usagi". Fuyuhiko Usami loves both of his sons equally and wants what is best for both of them. However, he is known to become quite ruthless in his need to accomplish that. He was married into the Usami family, originally being a commoner, which explains why he does not appreciate the relationship between Akihiko and Misaki. There are times he will step in to stop their relationship, but in the last episode of season two, he eventually accepts. Like his youngest son, Akihiko, he is very fond of bears and enjoys the art of woodcarving. He owns a successful business and is often seen carrying rubber ducks. It is briefly mentioned by Akihiko that Fuyuhiko was adopted.
Kaoruko Usami (宇佐見 薫子, Usami Kaoruko)
Voiced by Mizuki Nana
Kaoruko Usami is Akihiko's cousin on his mother's side. Akihiko did mention once that his father was adopted, so it is possible that Akihiko's mother is a blood relative of the Usami family, including Kaoruko Usami. A 20-year-old aspiring pâtissier (pastry chef), Kaoruko came to Japan after she was told her parents had fallen ill; however, this is revealed to be a trick on the part of her uncle Fuyuhiko, who wished for her to marry Haruhiko in an effort order to separate him from Misaki. As time progresses, however, Kaoruko claims to love Misaki, as she has the "same taste" as Akihiko.
Mizuki Shiiba (椎葉 水樹, Shiiba Mizuki)
Voiced by Hiro Shimono
Mizuki is Akihiko's 25-year-old cousin from his father's side of the family. He has returned from America to visit Akihiko, freeloading off of his cousin while living in Akihiko's apartment. While he is shown to be quite attached to Akihiko, he comes off as cold and hostile toward Misaki; this is later revealed to be due to his feelings for Kaoruko, sensing her attraction towards Misaki.
Shinnosuke Tōdō (藤堂 進之介, Tōdō Shinnosuke)
Voiced by Wataru Hatano
Shinnosuke is Misaki's friend and classmate. He is attending Mitsuhashi University as a law student with aspirations of becoming a police officer in the future. He is also a member of the Kendo club. He met Misaki when he picked up The☆Kan phone strap that Misaki had dropped and the two easily bond over their shared love for The☆Kan manga.
Kyō Ijuuin (伊集院 響, Ijuuin Kyō)
Voiced by Hozumi Gōda
Kyō Ijuuin is the creator of Misaki's favorite manga, The☆Kan. Whenever the deadline for his next manga installment is near, he becomes incredibly pessimistic. According to Isaka, it is disputed as to whether The☆Kan is in first or second place in terms of sales at Marukawa Publishing. Misaki first met him at Marukawa when Kyō was in one of his pre-deadline funks, with Misaki giving him the motivation to continue by telling him how much his work meant to him. Later on, Misaki was selected in a lottery to meet him again for an autograph signing, then realized it was Misaki who encouraged him three years ago. Kyō is a bachelor who, when cleaned up, is shown to be a considerably attractive man. The majority of his fans are said to be women. It is revealed later in the series, that he has feelings for Misaki.
Tanaka (田中, Tanaka)
Voiced by Kenta Miyake
Tanaka is the butler for the Usami household, often mistakenly called "Sebastian" by Misaki. There was another time when child Kamijou Hiroki mistakenly called him "Mary". This is because the Japanese word for butler, shitsuji, sounds very similar to the Japanese word for sheep, hitsuji.
Mahiro Takahashi (高橋 真浩, Takahashi Mahiro)
Voiced by Yuuko Yamazaki
Takahiro and Manami's toddler-age son, Misaki's nephew and Akihiko's godson. His name is a combination of his mother's (Manami) and his father's-(Takahiro) names; Mahiro often mispronounces people's names-(such as calling Usami "Unagi", much to the latter's annoyance).
Risako Takatsuki (高槻 理沙子, Takatsuki Risako)
Voiced by Mayumi Asano
The ex-wife of Yō Miyagi and the older sister of Shinobu Takatsuki. Shortly after her divorce with Miyagi, Shinobu (Risako's younger brother) confesses to Miyagi and they begin a relationship, of which she is unaware. Risako was cheating on her husband because she felt that she did not love him anymore. However, in reality, she did love him but she always felt unloved because of his strong attachment of his deceased teacher. She felt that Miyagi never loved her at all and decided to divorced her because of her infidelity.
Manami Takahashi (高橋 真奈美, Takahashi Manami)
Voiced by Kumiko Hashimoto
She is the fiance and later the wife of Takahiro Takahashi, the mother of Mahiro, and the sister-in-law of Misaki.
Ryou Shizukuishi (雫石涼, Shizukuishi Ryou)
Voiced by Toshiyuki Toyonaga
A new manga editor of Kyo Ijuuin. He often displays a cold emotionless attitude especially when he first meets Misaki; he also disapproves of people being huge crazy fans of Kyo's work even though he himself is a massive fan himself. It can be assumed that he secretly harbors a crush on Kyo.

=== Junjo Egoist ===
Hiroki Kamijou (上條 弘樹, Kamijō Hiroki)
Voiced by Kentarō Itō (adult) and Eri Kitamura (child)
In the anime, Hiroki Kamijou (the uke of the Egoist couple) is 29 years old (31 years old in season three), a long-time friend of Akihiko's, and an associate professor at Mitsuhashi University. He is a bit of a loner and is extremely passionate about classical Japanese literature, apparently having graduated at the top of his class. Hiroki initially loved Akihiko, his childhood friend. Six years prior to the main events of the story, he took advantage of Akihiko's unrequited love for Takahiro, convincing him to wear a blindfold as he pretended be Takahiro. Hiroki hoped that once Akihiko was intimate with him, his feelings would change, but Hiroki soon realized that he could never be with Akihiko as long as he was in love with Takahiro. He sympathizes with Akihiko, however, for just as Akihiko yearns for Takahiro, Hiroki pines for Akihiko. Soon afterwards, Hiroki would meet Nowaki Kusama, a student four years his junior who refers to him as "Hiro-san". Over the next six years, Hiroki and Nowaki fall in love with each other, but their personal dreams seem to get in the way of their being together. Their story arc focuses on their attempts to start over after Nowaki returns from his study abroad.
In the series, he serves as an example of the tsundere character archetype: he has a bad temper and is feared among his students, who refer to him as "Devil Kamijou", though he is shown to be one who is actually quite shy and who becomes flustered easily. Misaki later makes a reference about his "difficult Japanese literature professor" later on while on a date with Akihiko. In season three, it is shown that Misaki complains to Todo about taking Kamijou's class, saying that he is very scary.
Nowaki Kusama (草間 野分, Kusama Nowaki)
Voiced by Nobutoshi Canna (adult) and Ryoko Shiraishi (child)
Orphaned as an infant, Nowaki Kusama (the seme of the Egoist couple) was abandoned at an orphanage during a heavy rain storm; as a result, he was named "Nowaki" ('typhoon' in Japanese) by the head of the orphanage, though elders seem to refer to him as "Wacchan". Six years before the main story, Nowaki first comes across Hiroki when he finds Hiroki crying about his unrequited feelings with Akihiko. After inviting him to spend the afternoon with him and his friends (the elders mentioned earlier), Nowaki goes on to insist that Hiroki become his tutor. Originally studying to become a social worker, he changes his mind and is currently in training to become a pediatrician. Kind, understanding, and patient, Nowaki shows these traits most often while he is around Hiroki. As Nowaki is four years younger than Hiroki, this fuels a desire in him to quickly catch up to Hiroki (mostly career-wise), as he believes Hiroki deserves someone who is his equal. He shows unrelenting devotion and love for Hiroki, never giving up on them even when Hiroki seems oblivious to it. Despite his age, Nowaki is actually much taller than Hiroki, a fact that initially irritated the older Hiroki.
Tsumori (津森, Tsumori)
Voiced by Susumu Chiba
Nowaki's senior in the hospital whom Nowaki often consult to. He immediately knows what kind of relationship Nowaki has with Hiroki the first time he met Hiroki. He and Hiroki shares a rather cold relationship due to a misunderstanding when Hiroki found him and Nowaki sleeping together on the floor, naked. Although having no romantic feeling towards neither Nowaki nor Hiroki, he likes to tease on their relationship (being clingy to Nowaki, making Hiroki jealous). He is known to be some kind of player, shown in season three when he explains how he was slapped for hitting on a married woman.
Shinoda (篠田, Shinoda)
A real estate agent, Shinoda met Hiroki while trying to get him to sign a real estate contract. He and Hiroki had a brief romantic relationship while Hiroki was dealing with his feelings for Akihiko. He makes a short appearance and is only in the manga.

=== Junjo Terrorist ===
You Miyagi (宮城 庸, Miyagi Yō)
Voiced by Kazuhiko Inoue
In the anime, You Miyagi (the seme of the Terrorist couple) is a 35-year-old literature professor at Mitsuhashi University and co-worker of Kamijo Hiroki. He was once married, but is now divorced, though this is most likely due to his indifference toward feelings and emotions. Miyagi is often playful when it comes to teasing Hiroki, with whom he shares an office at the university, though his true character is seen to be far more serious due to an event from his past. He once tried to kiss Hiroki after noticing something was bothering him, but he was stopped at the last minute by Nowaki, who had come searching for Hiroki. Nevertheless, Miyagi seems to be supportive of Hiroki's relationship with Nowaki, stating that as long as Hiroki was happy, he would be happy for him. Miyagi's primary love interest in the series is introduced as Takatsuki Shinobu, his former brother-in-law who is seventeen years his junior.
Shinobu Takatsuki (高槻 忍, Takatsuki Shinobu)
Voiced by Daisuke Kishio
Shinobu Takatsuki (the uke of the Terrorist couple) is an 18-year-old high school student and the son of Mitsuhashi University's dean of literature. Shinobu believes it to be fate that he is in love with his former brother-in-law, Yo Miyagi, though would very much like Miyagi to take responsibility for Shinobu falling in love with him. He is often blunt and unreasonable, though he is shown to have a softer side.
Sensei (先生, Sensei)
Voiced by Yuki Masuda
She was Miyagi's deceased high school teacher. Miyagi says he often gave her a tough time before developing an unrequited love towards her. When her health started to deteriorate, Miyagi often took care of her despite his feelings not being reciprocated. When seeing how strongly he felt toward her, she told him that after her death if her memory proved to be an emotional burden then to forget about her, saying how she wants him to live a full and happy life with someone he can truly love.

=== Junjo Mistake ===
Ryūichirō Isaka (井坂 龍一郎, Isaka Ryūichirō)
Voiced by Toshiyuki Morikawa
Ryūichirō Isaka (the uke of the Mistake couple) is the 32-year-old president of Marukawa Publishing and a childhood friend of Haruhiko and Akihiko. He and his assistant Asahina are the main characters of the short comics released with the DVDs, "Junjo Mistake", which takes place ten years before the main Romantica storyline. Isaka initially aspired to become a novelist, though he eventually found his true talent in finding future best-sellers.
In the anime adaptation, he first appears interrupting Akihiko and Misaki while they are on a date. Isaka later appears in the spin-off series Sekai-ichi Hatsukoi, which centers around the relationship between Ritsu Onodera and Masamune Takano at Marukawa Publishing.
Kaoru Asahina (朝比奈 薫, Asahina Kaoru)
Voiced by Ryōtarō Okiayu
Kaoru Asahina (the seme of the Mistake couple) is Ryūichiro's secretary who came to work for the Isaka family when they helped his family out of a bad situation. Originally intended to be Isaka's playmate, he ended up becoming something more of a caretaker.

== Media ==
=== Manga ===
Written by Shungiku Nakamura, Junjo Romantica: Pure Romance began serialization in Asuka Ciel in 2002. The individual chapters have been compiled into twenty-nine tankōbon volumes by Kadokawa Shoten. The first volume was released on June 2, 2003; as of September 1, 2026, 31 volumes have been released.

The series was licensed for an English-language release in North America by Blu Manga, an imprint of Tokyopop, until Tokyopop's closure in May 2011. As of April 2011, 12 English volumes have been released. An attempt to gauge relative sales of manga titles by online vendors (based on publicly available "bestseller" listings) suggests that Junjo Romantica was the best-selling boys' love manga series of 2008 among online vendors. Volume 10 was #6 in the manga category of the New York Times "Graphic Books" weekly bestseller list for July 11, 2009, and volume 12 was #4 on the same list for September 10, 2010.

In 2017, Viz Media stated at Yaoi-Con that they received requests to re-license the series, but they decided against it due to the series being too long.

==== Volume listing ====
No.	Original release date	Original ISBN	English release date	English ISBN
1	June 2, 2003	978-4-04-853606-6	October 2006	978-1-59816-719-1
Junjo Romantica act 1; Junjo Romantica act 2; Junjo Egoist act 1; Junjo Egoist act 2; Junjo Romantica act 2.5
2	November 27, 2003	978-4-04-853702-5	February 2007	978-1-59816-720-7
Junjo Romantica act 3; Junjo Egoist act 3; Junjo Egoist act 4; Junjo Egoist act 5; Junjo Romantica act 3.5
3	May 28, 2004	978-4-04-853748-3	June 2007	978-1-59816-721-4
Junjo Romantica act 4; Junjo Romantica act 5; Junjo Romantica act 5.5; Junjo Egoist act 6; Junjo Egoist act 7
4	October 28, 2004	978-4-04-853778-0	October 2007	978-1-59816-722-1
Junjo Egoist act 8; Junjo Egoist act 9; Junjo Romantica act 6–1; Junjo Romantica act 6–2; Junjo Romantica act 6–3; Junjo Minimum act 1
5	April 27, 2005	978-4-04-853848-0	February 2008	978-1-59816-723-8
Junjo Romantica act 7; Junjo Romantica act 7.5; Junjo Terrorist act 1; Junjo Terrorist act 2; Junjo Terrorist act 3; Junjo Egoist act 9.5; Usami Akihiko and Takahashi Misaki
6	October 28, 2005	978-4-04-853907-4	June 2008	978-1-59816-724-5
Junjo Romantica act 8; Junjo Romantica act 9; Junjo Egoist act 10; Junjo Terrorist act 4
7	April 27, 2006	978-4-04-853953-1	September 2008	978-1-4278-0218-7
Junjo Terrorist act 5; Junjo Terrorist act 6; Junjo Terrorist act 7; Junjo Romantica act 10; Junjo Egoist act 11
8	January 29, 2007	978-4-04-854072-8	January 2009	978-1-4278-0707-6
Junjo Romantica act 11; Junjo Romantica act 12; Junjo Egoist act 12
9	October 30, 2007	978-4-04-854137-4	April 2009	978-1-4278-1284-1
Junjo Romantica act 13; Junjo Romantica act 14; Junjo Minimum act 5; Junjo Terrorist act 8
10	March 28, 2008	978-4-04-854162-6	July 2009	978-1-4278-1521-7
Junjo Romantica act 15; Junjo Romantica act 16; Junjo Egoist act 13
11	November 28, 2008	978-4-04-854270-8	December 2009	978-1-4278-1704-4
Junjo Romantica act 17; Junjo Romantica act 18; Junjo Minimum act 6; Junjo Terrorist act 9
12	August 27, 2009	978-4-04-854362-0	August 2010	978-1-4278-1789-1
Junjo Romantica act 19; Junjo Romantica act 20; Junjo Minimum act 7; Junjo Egoist act 14
13	June 28, 2010	978-4-04-854489-4	-	—
Junjo Romantica act 21; Junjo Romantica act 22; Junjo Romantica act 23; Junjo Terrorist act 10
14	April 26, 2011	978-4-04-854628-7	-	—
Junjo Romantica act 24; Junjo Romantica act 25; Junjo Romantica act 26; Junjo Romantica act 26.5; Junjo Egoist act 15
15	April 26, 2012	978-4-04-120226-5	-	—
Junjo Romantica act 27; Junjo Romantica act 28; Junjo Romantica act 29; Junjo Romantica act 29.5
16	December 20, 2012	978-4-04-120269-2	-	—
Junjo Romantica act 30; Junjo Romantica act 31; Junjo Romantica act 31.5; Junjo Egoist act 16
17	August 29, 2013	978-4-04-120863-2	-	—
Junjo Romantica act 32; Junjo Romantica act 33; Junjo Mistake act 3; Junjo Mistake act 3.5
18	August 1, 2014	978-4-04-101893-4	-	—
*Junjo Romantica act 34: Junjo Romantica act 35; Junjo Romantica act 36; Junjo Terrorist act 10.5
19	July 1, 2015	978-4-04-103123-0	-	—
*Junjo Romantica act 37: Junjo Romantica act 38; Junjo Terrorist act 11; Junjo Terrorist act 11.5
20	December 1, 2015	978-4-04-103321-0	-	—
Junjo Romantica act 39; Junjo Romantica act 40; Junjo Mix – Junjo Egoist; Junjo Mix – Junjo Terrorist; Junjo Mix – Junjo Mistake; Junjo Mix – Junjo Romantica; Junjo Romantica act 40.5
21	September 1, 2016	978-4-04-104272-4	-	—
Junjo Romantica act 41; Junjo Romantica act 42; Junjo Romantica act 42.5; Junjo Mix 2 – Junjo Egoist; Junjo Mix 2 – Junjo Terrorist; Junjo Mix 2 – Junjo Mistake; Junjo Mix 2 – Junjo Romantica
22	December 28, 2017	978-4-04-106077-3	-	—
Junjo Romantica act 43; Junjo Romantica act 44; Junjo Romantica act 44.5; Junjo Mix 5
23	September 1, 2018	978-4-04-107270-7	-	—
Junjo Mix – Shiiba Mizuki; Junjo Mix – Ijuuin Kyo; Junjo Romantica act 45; Junjo Romantica act 46; Junjo Romantica act 46.5
24	August 30, 2019	978-4-04-108604-9	-	—
Junjo Romantica act 47; Junjo Romantica act.48; Junjo Romantica act 48.5; Junjo Mix 6 – Junjo Romantica; Junjo Mix 6 – Junjo Egoist; Junjo Mix 6 – Junjo Mistake; Junjo Mix 6 – Junjo Terrorist
25	September 1, 2020	978-4-04-109804-2	-	—
Junjo Romantica act.49; Junjo Romantica act.50; Junjo Romantica act.50.5; Junjo Mix – Junjo Terrorist; Junjo Mix – Junjo Egoist; Junjo Mix – Junjo Mistake; Junjo Sentiment
26	September 1, 2021	978-4-04-111661-6	-	—
Junjo Romantica act.51; Junjo Romantica act.52; Junjo Romantica act.52.5; Junjo Sentiment
27	September 1, 2022	978-4-04-112838-1	-	—
28	September 1, 2023	978-4-04-113577-8	-	—
29	August 30, 2024	978-4-04-115004-7	-	—
30	September 1, 2025	978-4-04-116454-9	-	—
31	September 1, 2026	978-4-04-117606-1	-	—

=== Anime ===
Studio Deen produced an anime adaptation based around the manga series. Premiering in Japan on TV Hokkaido on April 10, 2008, the series' first season ran for twelve episodes until its conclusion on June 26, 2008. A second season premiered on the same channel on October 12, 2008, it also ended after twelve episodes. On March 28, 2012, a new anime adaptation of Junjo Romantica was announced to be in the works, which has been revealed as an OVA to be released with the limited edition Volume 16 on December 20, 2012. On August 29, 2013, it was announced that more anime for the series is in production. On July 30, 2014, it was confirmed that the series had been green-lit for a third season, which premiered on July 8, 2015.

The anime series is licensed for release in North America by Kadokawa Pictures USA; Season 1 was released on May 4, 2010. The series has not been dubbed for English audiences, but released in Japanese with English subtitles. Anime OVA in bundled with volume 16 is released on December 20, 2012. Nozomi Entertainment re-released the series on Blu-ray on July 17, 2017.

On July 9, 2015, at 1:05 am in Japan, the third season of the show was released and was credited as a sequel to the previous seasons.

== Reception ==
Junjo Romantica became the first boys' love title to enter the New York Times Manga Best Seller list when it debuted in week 28. According to Oricon and DVD sales data from Animesuki, the first DVD for the Junjo Romantica anime adaptation was released on July 25, 2008, and it became a hit, selling 8,406 copies in its first week. It is the fourth best selling debut DVD for an anime series of 2008, just after Gundam 00, Macross Frontier, and Aria the Origination. It continued to dwell on the Oricon anime DVD charts for the second week charting on the top five with total sales for the first DVD at 10,986 copies. With those sales, it is currently ranked at number one for the shōjo category on DVD sales for the year 2008. According to Oricon sales for the past five years, it is the best selling BL anime so far and has performed the best on the charts.

The second season's DVD sales have performed extremely well as well, selling an average of 7,000 to 8,000 copies, which makes it one of the most profitable anime series of the year. It is constantly ranked very high on Amazon Japan for the DVD category as well. Fan reviews and the responses were positive.

Jacob Chapman of Anime News Network noted that the series focuses on three couples, with superficial connections between characters, with no "crossover relationships" between the couples. However, he said that this is a "prime specimen" when it comes to BL works, but that the story's main couple is problematic, because there is rape involved, even though the two other couples in the series have consensual relationships. He also praised the anime's art and said that the show is a "feast for the fanbase with a few...ideas outside of its...main pairing".
