= The World's Greatest First Love =

Japanese manga series

- Cover of Sekai-ichi Hatsukoi volume 1

世界一初恋 (Sekai Ichi Hatsukoi)
- Genre: Comedy, Boys' love, Slice of life
- Manga

The World's Greatest First Love: The Case of Ritsu Onodera
- Written by: Shungiku Nakamura
- Published by: Kadokawa Shoten
- English publisher: NA: SuBLime
- Magazine: Emerald
- Original run: October 13, 2006 – present
- Volumes: 21
- Light novel

Sekai-ichi Hatsukoi: Yoshino Chiaki no Baai
- Written by: Shungiku Nakamura
- Published by: Kadokawa Shoten
- Original run: November 1, 2007 – present
- Volumes: 4
- Original video animation

Sekai-ichi Hatsukoi: No love's like to the first.
- Directed by: Chiaki Kon
- Written by: Rika Nakase
- Music by: Hijiri Anze
- Studio: Studio Deen
- Licensed by: Crunchyroll; SEA: Medialink
- Released: March 22, 2011
- Runtime: 30 minutes
- Anime television series
- Directed by: Chiaki Kon
- Written by: Rika Nakase
- Music by: Hijiri Anze
- Studio: Studio Deen
- Licensed by: Crunchyroll; SEA: Medialink
- Original network: TV Saitama
- Original run: April 9, 2011 – June 25, 2011
- Episodes: 12
- Original video animation

Sekai-ichi Hatsukoi: Hatori Yoshiyuki no Baai
- Directed by: Chiaki Kon
- Written by: Rika Nakase
- Music by: Hijiri Anze
- Studio: Studio Deen
- Licensed by: Crunchyroll; SEA: Medialink
- Released: September 27, 2011
- Runtime: 30 minutes
- Anime television series

Sekai-ichi Hatsukoi 2
- Directed by: Chiaki Kon
- Written by: Rika Nakase
- Music by: Hijiri Anze
- Studio: Studio Deen
- Licensed by: Crunchyroll; SEA: Medialink
- Original network: TV Saitama
- Original run: October 7, 2011 – December 23, 2011
- Episodes: 12
- Light novel

Sekai-ichi Hatsukoi: Yokozawa Takafumi no Baai
- Written by: Shungiku Nakamura
- Published by: Kadokawa Shoten
- Original run: November 1, 2011 – present
- Volumes: 6
- Anime film
- The World's Greatest First Love: The Case of Takafumi Yokozawa (2014)
- Anime film

The World's Greatest First Love: Proposal arc
- Directed by: Tomoya Takahashi
- Written by: Yoshiko Nakamura
- Music by: Hijiri Anze
- Studio: Studio Deen
- Licensed by: Crunchyroll; SEA: Medialink
- Released: February 21, 2020
- Runtime: 21 minutes

The World's Greatest First Love: The Case of Ritsu Onodera (Japanese: 世界一初恋 〜小野寺律の場合〜, Hepburn: Sekai-Ichi Hatsukoi: Onodera Ritsu no Baai; also alternatively known as Sekai Ichi Hatsukoi: The World's Greatest First Love in the English anime) is a Japanese manga series written and illustrated by Shungiku Nakamura. In 2011, the manga was adapted into an anime television series. Produced by Studio Deen under the direction of Chiaki Kon, the anime series began its broadcast run on April 9, 2011. An original animation DVD was bundled with the fifth and sixth volumes of the manga series, released in March and September 2011. A film adaptation was released on March 15, 2014.

On December 13, 2016, Funimation announced they had licensed the series, including the OVA. It was released on home-video on March 7, 2017.

In January 2018, the manga launched a game app version, which was released for the Smartphone/iOS.

A new anime adaptation focused on the Proposal Arc was announced to celebrate the fifth anniversary of the new Emerald magazine. It premiered on February 21, 2020. In June 2021, the anime was revisited by Funimation's Aedan Juvet where it was praised for its expansion of LGBTQ+ representation in anime.

Sekai-ichi Hatsukoi is a spin-off of Junjo Romantica, another series by the same author.

== Plot ==
Ritsu Onodera, a literary editor, resigns from his father's publishing company, due to his coworkers' jealousy toward his success, claiming that he is simply riding his father's coattails. He applies for a position at Marukawa Publishing in order to move away from his father's shadow, but instead of his preferred department of literature, he is placed in the infamous shōjo manga department, Emerald. He initially considers resigning, especially because he finds his new boss, Masamune Takano, intolerable and unnerving from the very beginning; however, Takano inadvertently convinces Onodera to stick with the job by calling him "useless", his pride forcing him to stay in order to prove his worth. Later, Onodera learns that Takano's old family name was Saga, and that he was an older schoolmate from high school that Onodera fell in love with and confessed to. It turns out Takano still has feelings for Onodera, and he tells him he will make him fall in love with him again. The series shows how Takano slowly achieves this goal, and the obstacles the two face.

There are also two other couples in this show; their stories are shown in later episodes. The characters follow Onodera's fellow editors: Hatori and his longtime friend (and manga artist he's in charge of) Yoshino, as well as Kisa and the attractive bookstore employee he has his eye on, Yukina.

An extra novel follows salesman and longtime friend of Takano's, Yokozawa, as he's swept off his feet following a harsh breakup by attractive widower and single father Kirishima.

== Characters ==
Ritsu Onodera (小野寺 律, Onodera Ritsu)
Voiced by: Takashi Kondō
Ritsu Onodera is a 25-year-old jaded literary editor. He is the only son of the head of Onodera Publications, previously working at his father's company in the literature department. Hearing his fellow co-workers accusing him of only getting ahead due to his father's influence, he decides to show that he can be successful on his own by going to work at Marukawa Publishing. After being hurt by his first love in high school when he was 15, Onodera vowed to never fall in love again. His resolve is tested, however, when he is reunited with the boy he once loved, Masamune Takano. With Takano now very much a man and his new boss, things become very complicated for Onodera as he must juggle his career and his feelings for his first love.
Before transferring to Marukawa Publishing, Onodera was an editor in charge Ryouichi Sumi, father of Misaki's friend Keiichi Sumi (also from Junjo Romantica).
Masamune Takano (高野 政宗, Takano Masamune)
Voiced by: Katsuyuki Konishi
The 27-year-old Masamune Takano, formerly known as Masamune Saga before his parents' divorce and his mother's remarriage, is the editor-in-chief of the Emerald department at Marukawa Publishing, where he is sometimes referred to as "the Capable." He and Onodera were once in a brief relationship in high school, but split up over a misunderstanding. It is later revealed that, during college, Takano went through a breakdown from his breakup with Onodera, family problems, and other personal issues, which in turn left him with unresolved feelings for Onodera. When both he and Onodera realize who each other are, he promises Onodera that he will make him fall in love with him again, much to Onodera's contempt.
In Sekai-ichi Hatsukoi: Takano Masamune no Baai (lit. 'Masamune Takano's Case'), the reader sees Takano's perspective on his and Onodera's first meeting and romantic development.
An Kohinata (小日向 杏, Kohinata An)
Voiced by: Yukari Tamura
An Kohinata is Onodera's childhood friend and his fiancée, due to an agreement their parents made when the two were kids; however, Onodera does not view her as his fiancée. Sweet, polite and sensitive, An has deep feelings for him, despite being rejected by Onodera (whom she calls "Ricchan") when she confessed her love.
Arata Haitani (灰谷 新, Haitani Arata)
Haitani is Takano's former co-worker at his previous job. He wishes to take revenge on Takano's for "stealing" his ex-lover. He seems to develop feelings for Ritsu, though it is unknown where it's genuine or not. He is later revealed to be bisexual.
Chiaki Yoshino (吉野 千秋, Yoshino Chiaki)
Voiced by: Shinnosuke Tachibana
Chiaki Yoshino is a 28-year-old shōjo manga artist known under the pseudonym Chiharu Yoshikawa (a female name). His editor in-charge is Hatori Yoshiyuki, who is also his childhood friend. His two best friends are Hatori and Yuu Yanase, but the lines between friendship and love begin to blur after a number of confusing incidents. Yoshino begins to question his feelings for Hatori after witnessing him and Yanase together in what he thinks is a kiss; then Hatori kisses him one night and confesses his feelings. Yoshino begins to realize he has to confront his true feelings or risk losing them both.
Yoshiyuki Hatori (羽鳥 芳雪, Hatori Yoshiyuki)
Voiced by: Yuichi Nakamura
Hatori, also known as Tori, is 28 years old and an editor in Marukawa's Emerald department. Although in the beginning he is seen as serious and reserved, it is later revealed that he has secretly harbored deep feelings for his childhood friend, Yoshino. After confessing his love, Hatori pulls away fearing that Yoshino doesn't feel the same, who he believes loves his rival, Yanase, instead. However, unbeknownst to Hatori, Yoshino does somewhat return those same feelings.
Yuu Yanase (柳瀬 優, Yanase Yū)
Voiced by: Hiroshi Kamiya
Chief assistant for manga artist Chiaki Yoshino, Yuu Yanase came to know both Hatori and Yoshino when they were in junior high school. An immediate tension is visible between Hatori and Yuu, though it is not until later that it is discovered that both are vying for the love of Yoshino.
Shouta Kisa (木佐 翔太, Kisa Shōta)
Voiced by: Nobuhiko Okamoto
Kisa is a fellow editor in the Emerald department and 30 years old, though he is usually mistaken for being much younger due to his looks. He considers himself gay but has never been in a serious relationship; in fact, he doesn't think himself capable of being in one because of his tendency to fall for a guy's good looks without knowing their personality. Because of this, he immediately questions his feelings for Kou and doesn't hold out much hope for a relationship with him. His mentality can be described by his line, "Love at first sight works well enough in manga, but this is reality."
Kou Yukina (雪名 皇, Yukina Kō)
Voiced by: Tomoaki Maeno
Kou Yukina is a 21-year-old clerk in charge of the shōjo manga section at the popular bookstore, Marimo Books. He's been aware of Kisa coming in to watch him, though he initially believed Kisa was just a shy high school student. When he discovers that Kisa is the editor behind all of his favorite works, however, he begins to develop romantic feelings for him, despite considering himself straight prior to their meeting. Throughout their relationship, Kou shows that he is more than willing to fight for Kisa, whom he tries to make understand that what they feel for each other is real and whom he believes to have the capability to fall in love.
Takafumi Yokozawa (横澤隆史, Yokozawa Takafumi)
Voiced by: Kenyu Horiuchi
Yokozawa works in the sales department at Marukawa. He is a close friend of Takano's, with whom he had a physical relationship when they were both in college. It is common knowledge in the publishing world that Yokozawa helped Takano get into publishing and his position at Marukawa. He is seriously jealous of and resents Onodera, whom he blames for "screwing up" Takano ten years ago. He often warns Onodera away from Takano, even going as far as proclaiming Takano is his.
He has his own side story entitled Takafumi Yokozawa No Baai about his new love interest, Kirishima Zen, as he handles his rejection by Takano.
Zen Kirishima (桐嶋禅, Kirishima Zen)
Voiced by: Tōru Furuya
Zen Kirishima was first introduced in Junjo Romantica as the editor-in-chief of Japun, the shōnen manga magazine; here, he is now the new love interest for Yokozawa. He is raising his daughter, Hiyori, on his own due to his wife's passing a few years ago. After blackmailing Yokozawa, the two begin dating upon realizing their feelings for one another. He has a habit of teasing Yokozawa, calling him the "mother" of his daughter Hiyori.
Hiyori Kirishima (桐嶋日和, Kirishima Hiyori)
Voiced by: Yui Horie
Hiyori is the 10-year-old daughter and only child of Zen Kirishima and his wife, the latter of whom died some time ago. She bonds quickly with Yokozawa, to whom she refers as "Onii-san" (big brother/older male figure). She's responsible for cooking her father's meals and is very fond of kittens and green tea sweets.
Kanade Mino (美濃奏, Mino Kanade)
Voiced by: Hikaru Midorikawa
Kanade Mino is a fellow editor in the Emerald department at Marukawa, who is constantly smiling through all the stress and exhaustion. It has been hinted that he has a dark side, with Takano stating, "Make sure you don't make Mino upset."
Ryūichirō Isaka (井坂 龍一郎, Isaka Ryūichirō)
Voiced by: Toshiyuki Morikawa
Isaka is the president of Marukawa Publishing and he is acquainted with Onodera's parents. He also appears as a character in Junjo Romantica. In "Junjo Mistake", the reader learns he has been in a relationship with his secretary/childhood playmate Asahina for the past ten years after both acknowledged their mutual feelings. He once aspired to be a novelist, but realized his real talents lay in finding future best-sellers. Like Onodera, others once implied that Isaka's success only came from his family's influence (when in reality it was his talent in nurturing authors to greatness), so he feels a kinship with Onodera, which annoys Onodera who wants to get away from that image.
Kaoru Asahina (朝比奈 薫, Asahina Kaoru)
Voiced by: Ryōtarō Okiayu
Asahina is Ryūichiro's assistant, who came to work for the Isaka family when they helped the Asahina family out of a bad situation. Originally intended to be Isaka's playmate, he ended up becoming something more of a caretaker and developed feelings for Isaka at a young age.
Saiki (彩紀)
Voiced by: Mai Nakahara
Ritsu's close friend and former co-worker from Onedera Publication, Ritsu's family's company.
Erika Ichinose (一之 瀬絵梨佳, Ichinose Erika)
Voiced by: Sayaka Ohara
A famous manga artist working for Emerald at Marukawa Publishing. Because her work is extremely popular, she is very wealthy and lives a luxurious lifestyle.

== Media ==
=== Manga ===
Written and illustrated by Shungiku Nakamura, Sekai-ichi Hatsukoi began serialization in the November 2006 issue of The Ruby magazine, which went on sale October 13, 2006. It moved to Asuka Ciel magazine in July 2009 where it continued through May 2014. Publisher Kadokawa announced in May 2014 that it would launch a real-life version of the Emerald manga magazine from Shungiku Nakamura's Sekai-ichi Hatsukoi manga. As of August 2014, Sekai-ichi Hatsukoi and Nakamura's other manga Junjo Romantica have switched publications to Emerald magazine. The individual chapters have been released as twenty-one tankōbon volumes by Kadokawa Shoten's Asuka Comic CL-DX branch. The first volume was published on July 1, 2008, and the nineteenth on May 1, 2024.

The first eight volumes of Sekai-ichi Hatsukoi have been licensed for an English release in February 2015 by SuBlime, a subsidiary of North American manga publisher Viz Media. The English title is The World's Greatest First Love: The Case of Ritsu Onodera, and volume one was printed in February 2015. Subsequent releases were every other month thereafter. The series was originally licensed for English-language release in North America by Tokyopop's Blu Manga, with volume one due for release on July 12, 2011, but went unused due to the May 31, 2011, closure of Tokyopop's publishing efforts.

No.	Original release date	Original ISBN	English release date	English ISBN
1	July 1, 2008	978-4-04-854190-9	February 10, 2015	978-1-4215-7916-0
The Case of Onodera Ritsu No. 1; The Case of Onodera Ritsu No. 2; The Case of Onodera Ritsu No. 2.5
2	August 1, 2009	978-4-04-854351-4	July 14, 2015	978-1-4215-7917-7
The Case of Onodera Ritsu No. 3; The Case of Onodera Ritsu No. 4; The Case of Onodera Ritsu No. 4.5
3	October 1, 2009	978-4-04-854371-2	October 13, 2015	978-1-4215-7918-4
The Case of Onodera Ritsu No. 5; The Case of Kisa Shouta No. 1; The Case of Kisa Shouta No. 2
4	July 1, 2010	978-4-04-854487-0	March 8, 2016	978-1-4215-7919-1
The Case of Onodera Ritsu No. 6; The Case of Onodera Ritsu No. 7; The Case of Onodera Ritsu No. 7.5; The Case of Kisa Shouta No. 3
5	April 1, 2011	978-4-04-854618-8; 978-4-04-900805-0 (SE)	October 11, 2016	978-1-4215-9014-1
The Case of Kisa Shouta No. 4; The Case of Onodera Ritsu No. 8; The Case of Onodera Ritsu No. 9; The Case of Kisa Shouta No. 4.5
6	September 27, 2011	978-4-04-854695-9; 978-4-04-854650-8 (SE)	April 11, 2017	978-1-4215-9350-0
The Case of Onodera Ritsu No. 10; The Case of Takano Masamune No. 1; The Case of Onodera Ritsu No. 11; The Case of Takano Masamune No. 1.5
7	July 30, 2012	978-4-04-120308-8; 978-4-04-120309-5 (SE)	July 11, 2017	978-1-4215-9650-1
The Case of Onodera Ritsu no. 12; The Case of Onodera Ritsu no. 13; The Case of Yukina Kou no. 1; The Case of Onodera Ritsu no. 13.5
8	July 31, 2013	978-4-04-120814-4	October 10, 2017	978-1-4215-9751-5
The Case of Onodera Ritsu no. 14; The Case of Onodera Ritsu no. 15; The Case of Kisa Shouta no. 5; The Case of Kisa Shouta no. 5.5
9	August 29, 2014	978-4-04-121135-9; 978-4-04-121136-6 (SE)	January 9, 2018	978-1-4215-9752-2
The Case of Onodera Ritsu no. 15; The Case of Onodera Ritsu no. 16; The Case of Yukina Kou no. 2; The Case of Kisa Shouta no. 6
10	August 28, 2015	978-4-04-103318-0	July 10, 2018	978-1-4215-9908-3
The Case of Onodera Ritsu no. 18; The Case of Onodera Ritsu no. 19; The Case of Kisa Shouta no. 7; The Case of Kisa Shouta no. 7.5
11	July 1, 2016	978-4-04-104154-3	October 9, 2018	978-1-4215-9955-7
The Case of Onodera Ritsu no. 20; The Case of Onodera Ritsu no. 21; The Case of Onodera Ritsu no. 22; The Case of Onodera Ritsu no. 22.5
12	July 1, 2017	978-4-04-105784-1; 978-4-04-1-05785-8 (SE)	April 9, 2019	978-1-4215-9954-0
The Case of Onodera Ritsu no. 23; The Case of Onodera Ritsu no. 24; The Case of Onodera Ritsu no. 25; The Case of Yukina Kou no. 3
13	May 1, 2018	978-4-04-106502-0; 978-4-04-106503-7 (SE)	April 14, 2020	978-1-9747-0403-3
The Case of Onodera Ritsu no. 25; The Case of Onodera Ritsu no. 26; The Case of Kisa Shouta no. 8; The Case of Masamune Takano
14	May 1, 2019	978-4-04-108141-9	April 13, 2021	978-1-9747-1244-1
The Case of Onodera Ritsu no. 27; The Case of Onodera Ritsu no. 28; The Case of Onodera Ritsu no. 28.5; The Case of Yukina Kou no. 4
15	May 1, 2020	978-4-04-109478-5; 978-4-04-109477-8 (SE)	January 11, 2022	978-1-9747-2400-0
The Case of Onodera Ritsu no. 29; The Case of Masamune Takano; The Case of Shota Kisa no. 9; The Case of Takafumi Yokozawa; The Case of Ritsu Onodera no. 29.5
16	May 1, 2021	978-4-04-111266-3	July 11, 2023	978-1-9747-3699-7
The Case of Onodera Ritsu No.30; The Case of Onodera Ritsu No.31; The Case of Kisa Shota No.10; The Case of Kiyomiya Nao
17	April 30, 2022	978-4-04-112086-6	May 14, 2024	978-1-9747-4569-2
The Case of Onodera Ritsu – Special Mix; The Case of Hatori Yoshiyuki – Special Mix; The Case of Kisa Shota – Special Mix; The Case of Yokozawa Takafumi – Special Mix; The Case of Onodera Ritsu No.32; The Case of Onodera Ritsu No.33; The Case of Onodera Ritsu No.33.5
18	May 1, 2023	978-4-04-113194-7	June 10, 2025	978-1-9747-5354-3
The Case of Onodera Ritsu No.34; The Case of Onodera Ritsu No.35; The Case of Onodera Ritsu No.35.5; The Case of Kisa Shouta No.11
19	May 1, 2024	978-4-04-114391-9; 978-4-04-114837-2 (SE)	June 9, 2026	978-1-9747-6303-0
20	May 1, 2025	978-4-04-115844-9; 978-4-04-115843-2 (SE)	—	—
21	May 1, 2026	978-4-04-117299-5; 978-4-04-117298-8 (SE)	—	—

=== Novels ===
As of April 2011, there have been four novels published telling the story of Hatori and Yoshino, titled Yoshino Chiaki no Baai (lit. 'The Case of Chiaki Yoshino'), authored by Fujisaki Miyako. There are also mini-comics drawn by Shungiku Nakamura included at the end of each novel.

As of December 2012, three novels about Yokozawa and his new lover have been published, titled "Yokozawa Takafumi no Baai" (lit. 'The Case of Takafumi Yokozawa'). These novels also include mini-comics. In 2013's January issue of Asuka Ciel magazine, it was confirmed that an anime adaptation film of this story is currently in development. The series director, Chiaki Kon, also directed the film. In addition, a special Sekai-ichi Hatsukoi anime short called "Valentine-hen'" was screened alongside the film on March 15, 2014.

The Case of Chiaki Yoshino

No.	Original release date	Original ISBN	English release date	English ISBN
1	November 1, 2007	978-4-04-445533-0	—	—
The Case of Chiaki Yoshino No.1; The Case of Chiaki Yoshino No.2; The Case of Chiaki Yoshino ComicSide
2	November 1, 2008	978-4-04-445539-2	—	—
The Case of Chiaki Yoshino No.3; The Case of Chiaki Yoshino No.4; The Case of Chiaki Yoshino No.5; The Case of Chiaki Yoshino 2 Comic Side; Afterword
3	November 2, 2009	978-4-04-854371-2	—	—
The Case of Chiaki Yoshino No.6; The Case of Yoshiyuki Hatori No.1; The Case of Chiaki Yoshino No.7; The Case of Chiaki Yoshino 3 ComicSide; Afterword
4	March 31, 2011	978-4-04-445551-4	—	—

The Case of Chiaki Yoshino (Omnibus)
Reprints of volume 1–4 of The Case of Chiaki Yoshino.

No.	Original release date	Original ISBN	English release date	English ISBN
1	July 1, 2016	978-4-04-104155-0	—	—
The Case of Chiaki Yoshino No.1; The Case of Chiaki Yoshino No.2; The Case of Yoshiyuki Hatori No.1 ComicSide; The Case of Chiaki Yoshino No.3; The Case of Chiaki Yoshino No.4; The Case of Chiaki Yoshino No.5; The Case of Yoshiyuki Hatori No.2 ComicSide; The Case of Yoshiyuki Hatori No.1; The Case of Yuu Yanase No.1 ComicSide
2	August 1, 2016	978-4-04-104156-7	—	—

The Case of Takafumi Yokozawa

No.	Original release date	Original ISBN	English release date	English ISBN
1	October 29, 2011	978-4-04-100046-5	—	—
2	August 31, 2012	978-4-04-100453-1	—	—
3	November 30, 2012	978-4-04-100588-0	—	—
4	June 29, 2013	978-4-04-100895-9	—	—
5	February 28, 2014	978-4-04-101249-9	—	—
6	September 30, 2014	978-4-04-102208-5	—	—

The Case of Takafumi Yokozawa (omnibus)
Reprints of Volumes 1–6 of The Case of Takafumi Yokozawa.

No.	Original release date	Original ISBN	English release date	English ISBN
1	August 1, 2016	978-4-04-104157-4	—	—
2	September 1, 2016	978-4-04-104158-1	—	—
3	October 1, 2016	978-4-04-104159-8	—	—

The Case of Yoshiyuki Hatori

No.	Original release date	Original ISBN	English release date	English ISBN
1	July 1, 2016	978-4-04-104160-4	—	—
The Case of Yoshiyuki Hatori No.1; The Case of Yoshiyuki Hatori No.2; The Case of Yoshiyuki Hatori No.3; The Case of Yoshiyuki Hatori No.1 ComicSide
2	July 1, 2017	978-4-04-105783-4	—	—

The Case of Animate

No.	Original release date	Original ISBN	English release date	English ISBN
1	May 1, 2017	978-4-04-105299-0	—	—

=== Anime ===
The first season opening for the anime is 「世界で一番恋してる」 ("Sekai de Ichiban Koishiteru") by Shuhei Kita and the ending is 「明日、僕は君に会いに行く。」 ("Ashita Boku wa Kimi ni Ai ni Iku") by Wakaba. The second season opening is 「世界の果てに君がいても」 ("Sekai no Hate ni Kimi ga Itemo") by Shuhei Kita and the ending is 「アイコトバ」 "Aikotoba" by Sakura Merry-Men. The second season featured Junjo Mistake in episode six. An OVA, bundled with the limited edition of the manga's sixth volume, was released in September. A new anime adaptation, focusing on the Proposal Arc, premiered on February 21, 2020.

==== Season 1 ====
No.	Title	Original release date
OVA	"No love's like to the first."	March 22, 2011
Ritsu Onodera meets and immediately falls for upperclassman Masamune Saga. Keeping his distance for the next three years, he unexpectedly runs into Saga at the school library and finds himself confessing, and is even more shocked when Saga says he has no problem hanging out with him. At Saga's house events take an unexpected turn, and Ritsu finds himself in a relationship with the boy of his dreams. In the end Ritsu wakes up at work, now 25 years old and dreaming about a flame from his past who jaded his view on love, and is antagonized by his boss Masamune Takano for falling asleep during a busy time of the publishing cycle.
1	"First impressions are the most lasting."	April 9, 2011
Onodera begins work at his new position at Emerald, and is harshly introduced to their production "cycle" by being thrown into the mess of their burned-out phase, in which everyone appears brutally overworked and exhausted. He is shocked to find them transformed the next day into composed and energetic people who spiritedly show him the basics of manga editing.
2	"A man has free choice to begin love but not to end it."	April 16, 2011
As Onodera continues learning the ropes of manga editing and publishing, his interactions with Takano become more tense and uncomfortable. Takano eventually realizes who Onodera is, later revealing his identity to Onodera as his first love from high school, bringing back memories of being used and tossed aside, even though, as Takano explains, they were fuelled by a gross misunderstanding. He is left conflicted in regards to his true feelings toward Takano.
3	"In love there is both dotage and discretion."	April 23, 2011
After Takano and another staff member have a heated argument in the Emerald office about an underprinted publication, Onodera sees the two of them later having a seemingly friendly conversation in the lobby, stirring a sense of jealousy within him. Perturbed by the fact that this bothered him, he begins avoiding Takano even more, prompting Takano to confront him about the situation before it begins affecting their capacity to work together.
4	"Adversity makes a man wise."	April 30, 2011
The author that Onodera has been overseeing suddenly falls ill along with all of her helpers near the publication deadline. He rushes to the distant Hokkaido to assist her personally, despite protests from his superiors. As the entire editing staff stands on the end of their nerves, Onodera barely makes the deadline with the finished manuscript. He later falls asleep on the train with Takano, and finds himself sleeping in the same bed as Takano the following morning, flustering his emotions and pushing him further into refusal to open himself to Takano.
5	"Love is lawless."	May 7, 2011
This episode introduces a new set of characters – Chiaki Yoshino, a male author who releases shōjo manga under the female pseudonym Chiharu Yoshikawa; Yoshiyuki Hatori, his manager and childhood friend; and Yuu Yanase, his chief assistant, who is on rough but unclear terms with his manager. Hatori's increasing coldness toward Chiaki begins to take its toll on their friendship, and when pressed on personal matters, Hatori becomes distant. Chiaki later sees Hatori and Yuu in an alley having what he interprets as an argument between lovers. Growing distraught with confusion that begins to affect his ability to write, Chiaki slowly realizes his feelings for Hatori. However, Hatori later confesses his love for Chiaki, much to his surprise, along with admitting that he had changed Chiaki's management behind Chiaki's back, fearing that his confession would put their relationship on bad terms. This forces Chiaki to admit his own budding feelings.
6	"Go to the sea, if you would fish well."	May 14, 2011
After an onsen trip, Chiaki is burned out and can hardly concentrate on work. The emerging love triangle between him, Hatori and Yuu compounds his inability to focus as well. Later on in Chiaki's apartment, Hatori informs him that he must attend an upcoming party because his manga will be made into an anime and he must meet the people in charge. Hatori offers to pick a suit for Chiaki, but Chiaki prefers to go shopping with Yuu instead, sparking jealousy in Hatori. After Yuu leaves, Hatori makes tries to kiss Chiaki, upon which Chiaki pushes Hatori away because he feels that Hatori is moving too fast. This upsets Hatori and he leaves. During the party, after meeting the anime staff, Chiaki sees Hatori surrounded by many women, including Ichinose Erika; a top writer who is known to have taken a liking to Hatori. Chiaki, feeling that Hatori is comfortable with the writer, becomes jealous and promptly leaves the party with Yuu. Hatori eventually arrives at Chiaki's place because he still needs to discuss some corrections with Chiaki's manga. Chiaki smells perfume on Hatori; feeling that the writer at the party may have gotten too close him, he becomes angry. Hatori reassures Chiaki otherwise and also confesses his jealousy about Chiaki and Yuu, feeling that Chiaki favors Yuu over him. Chiaki also reassures him and Hatori tells him that he loves him, and will continue to tell him until he can never forget. The morning after, Yuu admits to Chiaki that he is in love with someone, but when Chiaki asks who the person is, he simply says that Hatori knows the person well, leaving Chiaki puzzled and confused.
7	"Coming events cast their shadows before them."	May 21, 2011
The episode begins with Ritsu having another flashback dream, in which he sees Saga sleeping in the library and tries to find out what book he was reading, but runs away when he thinks Saga is about to wake up. Afterwards, Ritsu wakes up and goes to work. At Marukawa, Ritsu's assignment is to make his first proposal as a manga editor to publish the manga he's supervising as a book. It is initially rejected by Takano, so he stays late at night working on it. Later that night, Takano helps Ritsu with his proposal and Takano suddenly kisses him to break the tension, and consequently gets hit by Ritsu. Yokozawa then arrives and sends Takano to meet someone. When he's alone with Ritsu, Yokozawa proclaims Takano as his property, and doesn't believe Ritsu's words about not having any relation with Masamune other than that of boss-subordinate. At a bookstore the next day, Ritsu meets an old female friend from his previous job, and they go for drinks. She gets drunk, stumbles, and falls into Ritsu's arms. This is seen by Takano, who had just arrived with Ichinose Erika, a female writer, to discuss work (Ritsu misunderstands this and feels jealous). When he arrives home, Takano accuses him of not working hard enough. Takano makes another pass and admits to being in love with him, but Ritsu (who is still wary of admitting his love for Takano) runs away and leaves Takano alone in his apartment. The proposal meeting day arrives and Ritsu is quite nervous, but Takano tries to cheer him up on the way to the meeting. In this episode Junjou Romantica character; Isaka Ryuichiro appears.
8	"Looks breed love."	May 28, 2011
Kisa sees Yukina, the Marimo Books employee he has been attracted to for a while, selling the latest book he has edited. Tall, handsome and charming; Yukina is extremely popular among girls, who are easily convinced to buy his books. Kisa does not believe they could ever be together. Checking his sales, Kisa notices they're very high at Marimo Books, as they have been for his previous books too. They are finally introduced to each other by Yokozawa in the bookstore. Just as Kisa is leaving the store, he runs into a persistent ex-lover. After being rejected again, the man is about to hit Kisa when he is stopped by Yukina, giving Kisa an opportunity to flee. Later on, Yukina happens to find Kisa in the little-known cafe he had run away to. They talk, and Yukina correctly guesses the authors Kisa has been in charge of, saying they had a similar atmosphere despite being very different books. He is also astounded by Kisa's youthful looks after learning he is actually 30 years old. Yukina reveals he himself is a 21-year-old art student. As he plans a fair to promote Kisa's latest book, it begins to rain. Kisa, however, is lost in thought and doesn't hear Yukina asking him if he has an umbrella. Noticing this, Yukina leans in and kisses Kisa.
9	"The die is cast."	June 4, 2011
Kisa freaks out and cannot concentrate on work because of his constant flashback to the scene with Yukina at the cafe. He soon receives an e-mail from Yukina inviting him to the bookstore to see the book promotion display stand that they planned earlier. This reminds Kisa of the kiss and he throws himself into a brief depression after convincing himself that Yukina cannot be serious about the kiss. He gets even more down after belittling himself career-wise by comparing his achievements to Takano's. After work, Kisa subconsciously arrives at the bookstore, where Yukina shows him the display stand and tells him that the reason he worked so hard on the display was because of Kisa. Noticing that Kisa has been trying to avoid him, Yukina invites him to talk after he finishes work. As Kisa waits for Yukina outside the store, he encounters the persistent ex-lover yet again. The ex-lover finds out about Kisa's feelings for Yukina and threatens to expose him but was defeated by Yukina, who appeared suddenly and claimed himself to be Kisa's boyfriend. Kisa and Yukina end up in Yukina's house, where Yukina finds out that Kisa was in charge of editing all his favorite manga. He then surprises Kisa by telling him how he knows about Kisa's feelings for him from the start, but when he begins to talk about the kiss Kisa immediately interrupts him by saying that he does not care, which makes Yukina confess to Kisa. Afterwards, Kisa receives notice that his book is getting a second printing, and when Yukina tells him that he loves him after Kisa notified Yukina of the news, Kisa decides that he has fallen in love despite the fact that he claims he can only like men's faces.
10	"Absence makes the heart grow fonder."	June 11, 2011
After working through the night to finish work, Yoshino and Yuu stays behind together. Yuu saves Yoshino from falling over the trash can, and starts to tease him by tickling him. Hatori walks in on the scene and misunderstands. Later, Yoshino arrives at Hatori's house and attempts to apologize, but gets mad at Hatori when Hatori says he does not want Yoshino to have physical contact with Yuu. They make up temporarily in the morning after Yoshino sleeps over, but gets into a dispute again when Yoshino reveals that he is going to a hot spring with Yuu. On the night of the hot spring trip, Yoshino is surprised to find out that it is his own birthday on that day and realizes why Hatori is upset about his going away. Briefly after his realization, he receives an unexpected love confession from Yuu, but is interrupted by a phone call from Hatori. After hearing a "Happy birthday" from Hatori through the phone, Yoshino suddenly decides to terminate the vacation and go back to Hatori's house, where Hatori gave himself to Yoshino as a birthday present.
11	"It never rains but it pours."	June 18, 2011
Onodera wakes up in the doorway, still holding on to a store-bought dinner, and suddenly remembers a meeting that he was to sit in during the morning. On the subway, he complains about his lifestyle after joining the shōjo manga department. Onodera is surprised by the hostility in the proposal meeting and dreads future meetings. Afterwards, Onodera meets Sumi Ryouichi (father of Sumi Keiichi from Junjo Romantica), whom he was in charge of before in the literature department at his father's company. Through Sumi, Onodera also meets Hasegawa of the literature department, who later dropped in during work and invited him out for a drink. Takano, hearing the invitation, rejected it for Onodera. After commenting on Takano's strictness, Hasegawa reminds Onodera that he can always transfer to the literature department. Later, Onodera encounters Takano at the library and tries to run away. Takano saves him from falling down the stairs as Onodera trips on fallen leaves and they embrace. Takano tries to evoke past memories from the time when they were dating in high school, but Onodera runs again. At the apartment, Onodera encounters Yokozawa coming out from Takano's room with his cat, Sorata. Yokozawa confronts him and claims Takano as his, and further throws Onodera into confusion by recounting how Onodera had only hurt Takano since they have known each other.
12	"After a storm comes a calm."	June 25, 2011
Meeting Ryouichi Sumi and the advice from Hasegawa have put doubt into Ritsu Onodera's heart. He remembers the reason he transferred to Marukawa and wonders if he can continue to work as a manga editor. While he is struggling, Takano asks him if he wants transfer to the literature department. A call from an author interrupts Onodoera's thoughts, and the author expresses her gratitude for his work and gives him encouragement. Onodera relays her praise to Takano, who further shows his approval of Onodera's work. While at Onodera's place, Takano tells Onodera of the history between him and Yokozawa. As Onodera is immersed in his own thoughts about the two, Takano once again confesses his love for Onodera. This is the finale of season 1.

==== Season 2 ====
No.	Title	Original release date
OVA	"The Case of Hatori Yoshiyuki."	September 27, 2011
Hatori and Yoshino have been going out for a year now, and Hatori reflects over that. Yoshino gets a call from his mother who complains over how he never visits. As Hatori plans to go to his parents' house, Yoshino decides to go along with him and visit his mother and sister. While there, Mrs. Yoshino makes a remark how Hatori and Chinatsu (Yoshino's sister) would make a nice couple, which makes Yoshino jealous. Hatori is touched by how much Yoshino cares for him.
1 (13)	"A Good Beginning Makes a Good Ending."	October 8, 2011
Onodera leaves the office to visit the bookstore and thinks about how it has felt whenever Takano has touched him, but he dismisses these thoughts. At the bookstore, he runs into Yokozawa, and as they leave together, Yokozawa demands that Onodera move to a new home. Onodera argues that it his none of his business and teases Yokozawa that maybe he and Takano were dating. Yokozawa confirms this suspicion and Onodera realizes that Yokozawa doesn't like him because he is protecting Takano. Back at the office, Onodera overhears a conversation between two women, one of whom saw Takano and Yokozawa together the night before. Takano invites Onodera to dinner, and though Onodera declines, Takano makes the plan anyway. Onodera tries to avoid having dinner with Takano, but Takano catches him and they go to dinner at Takano's apartment. At dinner, Onodera becomes intoxicated and drunkenly confesses that Takano's behavior has an emotional effect on him. Takano denies the rumor about him and Yokozawa and tells Onodera that he is greatly affected by his presence as well, including at his job. The two have a heartfelt moment where Takano calls Onodera by his first name and Onodera calls him "senpai." The next morning, Onodera awakens to find himself naked in Takano's bed, unable to remember the events of the previous night, but pain in his hips and back leads him to realize that he and Takano might have done it. Despite this obvious evidence, he openly denies this taking place. Junjou Romantica's main character, Misaki makes a cameo during the train scene.
2 (14)	"One Cannot Love and Be Wise."	October 15, 2011
Onodera reflects upon how he imagined Christmas would be when he and Takano were together 10 years ago. Onodera runs a manuscript over to the printers and upon arriving back at the office, he receives an email from Takano telling him he can go home. As the elevator door opens, he sees Takano and Yokozawa talking and when they leave together, Yokozawa asks what Onodera's plans are for the 24th, which happens to be Takano's birthday. Yokozawa then implies to Onodera that he and Takano are still together, and he warns Onodera again to stay away from Takano. Onodera wishes Takano a happy birthday and as they part, Takano requests Onodera's company on a drive for his birthday gift. On the drive, Onodera reflects on his feelings toward Takano, and Takano reveals the true nature of his relationship with Yokozawa and reminds Onodera that he has loved him for 10 years. Takano admits that when they were still high school, he used to imagine how he was going to celebrate his birthday with Onodera, and Onodera tells him that he used to imagine it as well (though they were never able to do it since their relationship ended). They kiss, and Onodera admits to himself that he cannot resist Takano.
3 (15)	"Lingering Love Breeds Mistake."	October 21, 2011
Hatori asks Yoshino to do front color pages at the last minute as the person originally in charge of it had to be hospitalized. After the work was completed, he is told that one of his assistants likes Yuu and blacks out due to overwork and exhaustion as he had not slept in days. Afterwards, Yuu comes to visit Yoshino, during which they talk about their plans to go to a spa. This time Yoshino asks Yuu to have Hatori accompany them as well, but Yuu objects. Yoshino encourages Yuu to go out with his assistant as she has a crush on him, prompting a frustrated Yuu for the first time to confess to Yoshino. Yoshino tells him that he likes him as well, but Hatori (who came to drop off a manuscript) hears it and leaves the apartment angrily. After Hatori leaves, Yoshino explains that he only meant that he liked Yuu as he was an important friend to him and not in a romantic way, but Yuu asks him to think about it. Yoshino calls Hatori to his house as he wanted to clear up the misunderstandings. When Hatori comes, he tells Yoshino that he knows Yoshino wants to end their relationship. Yoshino becomes mad that Hatori drew that conclusion and tells him off about it. Hatori feels better as that meant Yoshino was confessing his feelings to him.
4 (16)	"Delay in love is dangerous."	October 28, 2011
Yoshino and Hatori make a date, but Hatori cancels at the last minute. Later Yoshino sees Hatori with his old high school girlfriend. An infuriated Yoshino turns to Yuu for comfort. While spending time at Yuu's place, Yoshino asks Yuu if he remembers Hatori's ex-girlfriend back in high school. Yuu remembers her and her name, and tells Yoshino how they look amazing together. Yuu receives a call from Hatori, but refuses to give the phone to Yoshino, and he tells him that he has decided to make him his. When Yoshino asks about what he said, Yuu tells him it's just a joke, but later admits that he really is in love with him. Yuu forces himself on Yoshino, but Yoshino hits him in the face, and quickly apologizes for it. This makes Yuu sob, asking Yoshino why he loves Hatori instead of him. Hatori arrives and tries to violently hit Yuu, but Yoshino intervenes. Back at Yoshino's place, Yoshino and Hatori get in an argument. Yoshino asks Hatori about his ex-girlfriend, and Hatori says that she is working at the printers and there is nothing between them. Hatori reminds Yoshino how much he loves him.
5 (17)	"Follow love and it will flee thee, flee love and it follow thee."	November 4, 2011
While trying to deal with the stress at work, Onodera gets an unexpected phone call and visit from his "fiancée" that causes a riff between him and Takano. On their way back home, Takano kissed Onodera in the train. When he is walking back home with Takano, Onodera saw his "fiancée" in front of his apartment. When Takano saw Onodera fiancé, he gets jealous and decides to go see his cat, Sorata, which is currently living at Yokozawa's house. Onodera stops him from going to Yokozawa's and explained everything about his "fiancée" situation to Takano. Onodera told his fiancée (early in the relationship) that he was in love with someone else (that person is Takano). Although Onodera didn't declare his love towards Takano, they kissed in front the door and Takano stayed for the night with Onodera, not going to Yokozawa's house.
6 (18)	"Love is without reason."	November 11, 2011
This episode is an adaptation of the previously un-animated side story from Junjou Romantica, Junjou Mistake. Originally wanting to be a novelist, Editor Ryuichiro Isaka is torn between choosing editing, which he apparently excels at (he can determine which book will perform well in sales), and writing, which he admits (to himself) that he isn't that good at. He is also struggling with his feelings toward his assistant and longtime companion, Kaoru Asahina.
7 (19)	"Actions speak louder than words."	November 18, 2011
Tonight is the company's annual New Year's Party and Onodera has to learn how to navigate the crowd of publishers, editors, and authors. Onodera and the rest of the editorial party go to work early to finish up before the party when Onodera gets an unexpected call from his mother about An-chan. Takano, to Onodera, calls An-chan his "girlfriend" until the end of the party where he thinks he might have learned the truth about Onodera's love.
8 (20)	"Love and envy make a man pine."	November 25, 2011
Shouta Kisa and his perfect boyfriend Yukina haven't been able to see much of each other because of Kisa's work. Yukina always complies with Kisa when he says he is busy at work, which causes Kisa to believe that Yukina's lack of anger means he doesn't love Kisa as much as Kisa thought he did. Kisa finally resolves to make time for Yukina no matter what after he hears about the marriage of a friend of his when a major project was given to him from Takano. Again, Yukina says it is fine when Kisa can't make it, but Kisa goes to his work and waits for him anyway after hurrying to finish his work. There, he unexpectedly finds Yukina meeting with a girl and watches them as the two walk towards the naughty part of town Kisa knows all too well.
9 (21)	"Love is blind."	December 2, 2011
Kisa just wants to end things with Yukina but doesn't know how to do it. At a moment of weakness Kisa agreed to go on date with a guy he met a while ago. The guy meets up at Kisa's residence and starts to kiss Kisa when Yukina surprisingly shows up. The two discuss the future of their relationship.
10 (22)	"Love goes never without fear."	December 9, 2011
Takano wants Onodera to admit his feelings, but before he can, Takano gets sick. When Onodera tries to visits, he is stopped by Yokozawa. A heated exchanged happens, leaving Onodera saying things he might regret…
11 (23)	"Love makes the world go round."	December 16, 2011
Takano and Yokozawa discuss their past and the future of their friendship. Takano and Onodera share a moment in the rain and talk about their time in school. A few startling truths are revealed that may change their opinion about each other.
12 (24)	"Love is a bitter-sweet."	December 23, 2011
Takano recalls memories of the past; his troubles with his family, and how he fell in love with Ritsu. This is the finale of season 2.
