= Studio Deen =

Japanese animation studio

Studio Deen Co., Ltd.

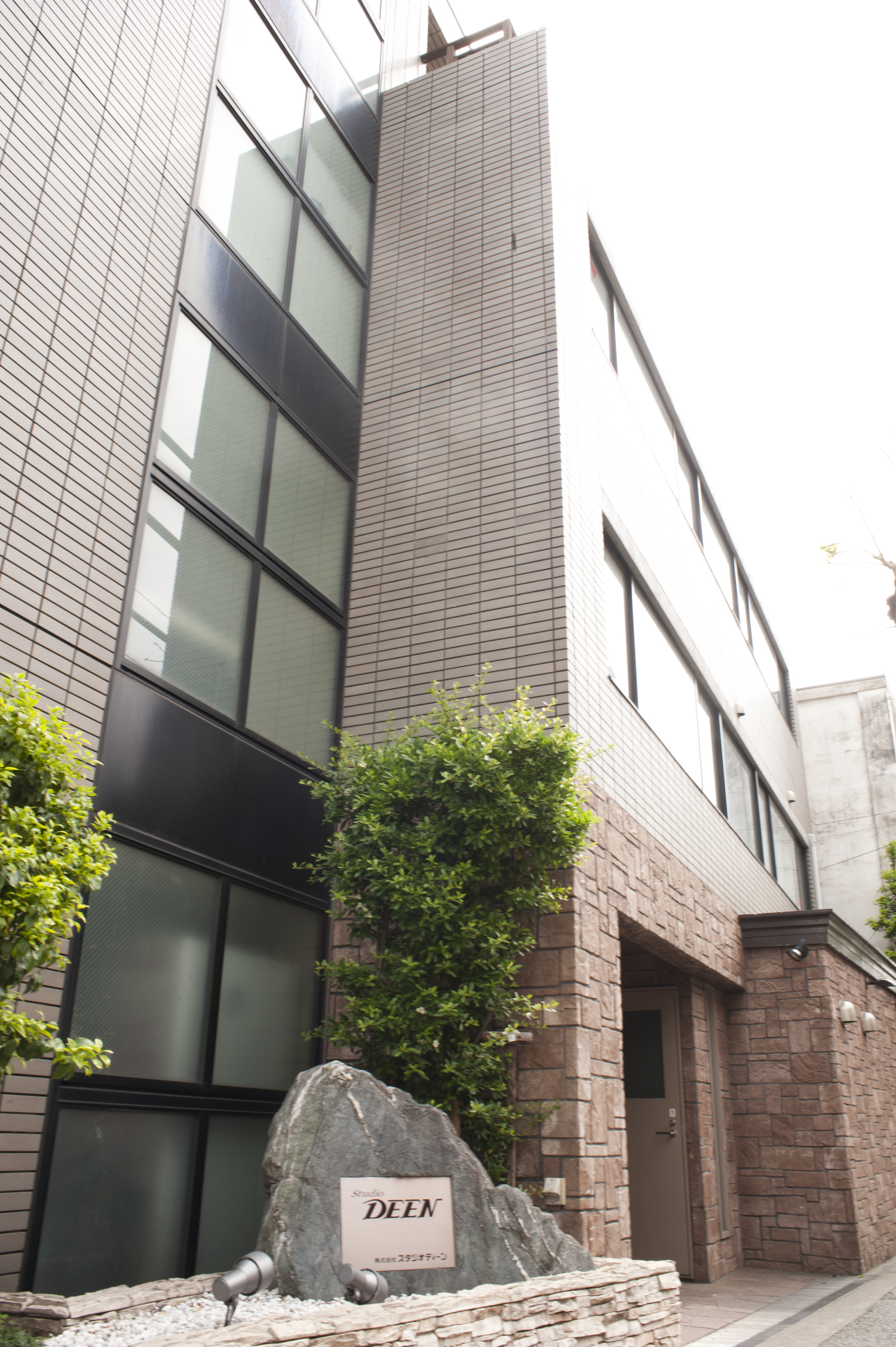
- Head office
- Native name: 株式会社スタジオディーン
- Romanized name: Kabushiki-gaisha Sutajio Dīn
- Type: Kabushiki gaisha
- Industry: Japanese animation
- Founded: March 14, 1975; 51 years ago
- Founder: Hiroshi Hasegawa
- Headquarters: Musashino, Tokyo, Japan
- Key people: Shinichiro Ikeda (president)
- Owner: IMA Group
- Number of employees: 143 (as of April 1, 2025)
- Subsidiaries: Danny Donghua; Megumi; Umidori
- Website: www.deen.co.jp

Studio Deen Co., Ltd. (Japanese: 株式会社スタジオディーン, Hepburn: Kabushiki-gaisha Sutajio Dīn; sometimes stylized as Studio DEEN) is a Japanese animation studio founded in 1975 by former Sunrise producer Hiroshi Hasegawa, along with a team of ex-Sunrise animators. The studio owns three subsidiaries: Danny Donghua (丹尼動画), a Chinese sub-contracting studio; Megumi (め組), a digital work sub-contracting studio; and Umidori (うみどり), a 3DCG sub-contracting studio. Studio Deen has been operating as a subsidiary of IMA Group since April 2011.

== Television series ==
=== 1984–2000 ===
- Urusei Yatsura (1984–1986, #107–195)
- Pro Golfer Saru (1985–1988, co-produced with Shin-Ei Animation)
- Maison Ikkoku (1986–1988)
- F (1988)
- Ranma ½ (1989)
- Ranma ½ Nettōhen (1989–1992)
- DNA² (1994, with Madhouse)
- Zenki (1995)
- Kuma no Putaro (1995-1996)
- You're Under Arrest (1996–1997)
- Violinist of Hameln (1996–1997)
- Rurouni Kenshin (1997–1998, #67–95)
- Eat-Man (1997)
- Haunted Junction (1997)
- Next Senki Ehrgeiz (1997)
- Don't Leave Me Alone, Daisy (1997)
- AWOL -Absent Without Leave- (1998)
- Eat-Man '98 (1998)
- Super Radical Gag Family (1998)
- Shadow Skill – Eigi (1998)
- Momoiro Sisters (1998)
- Eden's Bowy (1999)
- Houshin Engi (1999)
- Itsumo Kokoro ni Taiyō o! (1999)
- Let's Dance With Papa (1999)
- You're Under Arrest (1999)
- Mon Colle Knights (2000)
- Gravitation (2000–2001)

=== 2001–2010 ===
- You're Under Arrest 2 (2001)
- Star Ocean EX (2001)
- Fruits Basket (2001, 1st anime)
- Kokoro Library (2001)
- Sadamitsu the Destroyer (2001)
- Rave Master (2001–2002)
- Samurai Deeper Kyo (2002)
- Bomberman Jetters (2002–2003)
- Full Moon o Sagashite (2002–2003)
- GetBackers (2002–2003)
- Jing: King of Bandits (2002)
- The Mythical Detective Loki Ragnarok (2003)
- Mouse (2003)
- Yami to Bōshi to Hon no Tabibito (2003)
- Diamond Daydreams (2004)
- Maria-sama ga Miteru (2004)
- Maria-sama ga Miteru: Printemps (2004)
- Yumeria (2004)
- Get Ride! AMDriver (2004–2005)
- Tactics (2004–2005)
- Zipang (2004–2005)
- Kyo Kara Maoh! (2004–2006)
- Amaenaide yo!! (2005)
- Ginga Densetsu Weed (2005–2006)
- Hell Girl (2005–2006)
- The Law of Ueki (2005–2006)
- Amaenaide yo!! Katsu!! (2006)
- Binchō-tan (2006)
- Fate/stay night (2006)
- Higurashi no Naku Koro ni (2006)
- Hell Girl: Two Mirrors (2006–2007)
- Princess Princess (2006)
- Simoun (2006)
- Shōnen Onmyōji (2006–2007)
- Higurashi no Naku Koro ni Kai (2007)
- Shining Tears X Wind (2007)
- Tōka Gettan (2007)
- You're Under Arrest: Full Throttle (2007–2008)
- Code-E (2007)
- Shion no Ō (2007–2008)
- Fantastic Detective Labyrinth (2007–2008)
- Gag Manga Biyori 3 (2008)
- Mission-E (2008)
- Amatsuki (2008)
- Hatenkō Yūgi (2008)
- Junjo Romantica (2008)
- Vampire Knight (2008)
- Hell Girl: Three Vessels (2008–2009)
- Junjo Romantica 2 (2008)
- Vampire Knight Guilty (2008)
- Kyo Kara Maoh! Third Series (2008–2009)
- Maria-sama ga Miteru (2009)
- Cookin' Idol Ai! Mai! Main! (2009)
- 07-Ghost (2009)
- Student Council's Discretion (2009)
- Umineko no Naku Koro ni (2009)
- Gag Manga Biyori + (2010)
- Giant Killing (2010)
- Hakuoki: Demon of the Fleeting Blossom (2010)
- Nura: Rise of the Yokai Clan (2010)
- Hakuoki: Record of the Jade Blood (2010)
- Starry Sky (2010–2011)

=== 2011–2020 ===
- Dragon Crisis! (2011)
- Is This a Zombie? (2011)
- Sekai-ichi Hatsukoi (2011)
- Nura: Rise of the Yokai Clan: Demon Capital (2011)
- Sekai-ichi Hatsukoi 2 (2011)
- Poyopoyo Kansatsu Nikki (2012)
- Hakuoki: Dawn of the Shinsengumi (2012)
- Hiiro no Kakera: The Tamayori Princess Saga (2012)
- Is This a Zombie? of the Dead (2012)
- Sankarea: Undying Love (2012)
- Hiiro no Kakera: The Tamayori Princess Saga 2 (2012)
- Hakkenden: Tōhō Hakken Ibun (2013)
- Rozen Maiden: Zurückspulen (2013)
- Gifu Dodo!! Kanetsugu to Keiji (2013)
- Meganebu! (2013)
- Pupa (2014)
- Sakura Trick (2014)
- Meshimase Lodoss-tō Senki: Sorette Oishii no? (2014)
- Always! Super Radical Gag Family (2014)
- Samurai Jam -Bakumatsu Rock- (2014)
- Log Horizon 2 (2014–2015)
- Jewelpet: Magical Change (2015)
- Junjo Romantica 3 (2015)
- Descending Stories: Showa Genroku Rakugo Shinju (2016–2017)
- Reikenzan: Hoshikuzu-tachi no Utage (2016)
- KonoSuba (2016–2017)
- Rilu Rilu Fairilu ~Yousei no Door~ (2016–2017)
- Super Lovers (2016–2017)
- Haven't You Heard? I'm Sakamoto (2016)
- Tonkatsu DJ Agetarō (2016)
- First Love Monster (2016)
- Ao Oni: The Animation (2016–2017)
- Reikenzan: Eichi e no Shikaku (2017)
- Kabukibu! (2017)
- Rilu Rilu Fairilu ~Maho no Kagami~ (2017–2018)
- Hell Girl: The Fourth Twilight (2017)
- The Reflection (2017)
- Hozuki's Coolheadedness 2 (2017–2018)
- Junji Ito Collection (2018)
- Gurazeni (2018)
- Ongaku Shōjo (2018)
- Oshiete Mahou no Pendulum ~Rilu Rilu Fairilu~ (2018–2019)
- Agū: Tensai Ningyō (2018)
- Muhyo & Roji's Bureau of Supernatural Investigation (2018–2020)
- Xuan Yuan Sword Luminary (2018)
- Bakumatsu (2018–2019)
- Kochoki: Wakaki Nobunaga (2019)
- Outburst Dreamer Boys (2019)
- The Seven Deadly Sins: Imperial Wrath of The Gods (2019–2020)
- Sorcerous Stabber Orphen (2020)

=== 2021–present ===
- Log Horizon: Destruction of the Round Table (2021)
- The Seven Deadly Sins: Dragon's Judgement (2021)
- Sorcerous Stabber Orphen: Battle of Kimluck (2021)
- Sasaki and Miyano (2022)
- Sorcerous Stabber Orphen: Chaos in Urbanrama (2023)
- Power of Hope: PreCure Full Bloom (2023, with Toei Animation)
- Re:Monster (2024)
- The Banished Former Hero Lives as He Pleases (2024, with Marvy Jack)
- Welcome Home (2024)
- Days with My Stepsister (2024)
- Twilight Out of Focus (2024)
- Yakuza Fiancé: Raise wa Tanin ga Ii (2024)
- I'm a Noble on the Brink of Ruin, So I Might as Well Try Mastering Magic (2025, with Marvy Jack)
- Magic Maker: How to Make Magic in Another World (2025)
- Witchy Pretty Cure!! Mirai Days (2025, with Toei Animation)
- Gag Manga Biyori Go (2025)
- Binan Kōkō Chikyū Bōei-bu Haikara! (2025)
- Ninja vs. Gokudo (2025)
- The Dark History of the Reincarnated Villainess (2025)
- Isekai Office Worker: The Other World's Books Depend on the Bean Counter (2026)
- Shiboyugi: Playing Death Games to Put Food on the Table (2026)
- The Villainess Is Adored by the Prince of the Neighbor Kingdom (2026)
- Recommendations from Iwamoto-senpai (2026)
- Victoria of Many Faces (2026)
- From Far Away (2026)
- Multi-Mind Mayhem (2027)
- Dengeki Daisy (2027)
- Higurashi When They Cry (TBA)

== OVA/ONAs ==
- Urusei Yatsura (1985–1987, #1–3)
- Making of Urusei Yatsura 4: Lum the Forever (1986)
- Twilight Q: Mystery Article File 538 (1987)
- The Samurai (1987)
- Patlabor: Early Days (1988–1989)
- Eiyuu Gaiden Mozaicka (1991)
- Judo-bu Monogatari
- Domain of Murder (1992)
- Ranma ½ (1993–1994)
- You're Under Arrest (1994–1995)
- The Irresponsible Captain Tylor (1994–1996, episodes 3–10)
- Ranma ½ Special (1994–1995)
- DNA² (1995, with Madhouse)
- Ranma ½ Super (1995–1996)
- Shounen Santa no Bouken (1996)
- Kishin Dōji Zenki Gaiden: Anki Kitan (1997)
- Tekken: The Motion Picture (1998)
- Super Mobile Legend Dinagiga (1998)
- Rurouni Kenshin: Trust & Betrayal (1999)
- Phantom Hunter Miko (2000–2001, with Shinkūkan)
- Rurouni Kenshin: Reflection (2001-2002)
- Read or Die (2001)
- You're Under Arrest (2002)
- Jing: King of Bandits: Seventh Heaven (2004)
- Maria-sama ni wa Naisho (2004–2009)
- Maria-sama ga Miteru (2006–2007)
- Kyo Kara Maoh! R (2007–2008)
- Ranma ½: Nightmare! Incense of Spring Sleep (2008, with Sunrise)
- Higurashi no Naku Koro ni Rei (2009)
- Hetalia: Axis Powers (2009–2010)
- Hetalia: World Series (2010–2011)
- Rurouni Kenshin: New Kyoto Arc (2011–2012)
- Higurashi no Naku Koro ni Kira (2011–2012)
- Hakuoki: A Memory of Snow Flowers (2011–2012)
- Sekai-ichi Hatsukoi: No love's like to the first. (2011)
- Sekai-ichi Hatsukoi: Hatori Yoshiyuki no Baai (2011)
- Junjo Romantica (2012)
- Hetalia: The Beautiful World (2013)
- Higurashi no Naku Koro ni Kaku: Outbreak (2013)
- Hybrid Child (2014–2015)
- Descending Stories: Showa Genroku Rakugo Shinju (2015)
- Hetalia: The World Twinkle (2015)
- Haven't You Heard? I'm Sakamoto (2016)
- Hozuki's Coolheadedness (2017)
- Neo Yokio (2017, with Production I.G and Moi Animation)
- Rick and Morty (2020 special "Samurai & Shogun" & 2021 special "Samurai & Shogun Part 2")
- Sorcerous Stabber Orphen (2020)
- Hetalia: World Stars (2021)
- Hakuoki (2021–2022)
- Sasaki and Miyano (2022)
- Junji Ito Maniac: Japanese Tales of the Macabre (2023)
- Ōoku: The Inner Chambers (2023)

== Films ==
- Is This a Zombie? (2011-2012)
- Urusei Yatsura 3: Remember My Love (1985)
- Angel's Egg (1985)
- Urusei Yatsura 4: Lum the Forever (1986)
- Patlabor: The Movie (1989)
- Ranma ½: Big Trouble in Nekonron, China (1991)
- Ranma ½: Nihao My Concubine (1992)
- Dohyō no Oni-tachi (1994)
- Ranma ½: Super Indiscriminate Decisive Battle! Team Ranma vs. the Legendary Phoenix (1994)
- You're Under Arrest: The Movie (1999)
- Mon Colle Knights the Movie: The Legendary Fire Dragon and The Mysterious Tatari-chan (2000)
- Initial D Third Stage (2001, with Pastel)
- Fate/Stay Night: Unlimited Blade Works (2010)
- Hetalia: Axis Powers – Paint it, White! (2010)
- Hakuoki: Wild Dance of Kyoto (2013)
- Hakuoki: Warrior Spirit of the Blue Sky (2014)
- The World's Greatest First Love: The Case of Takafumi Yokozawa (2014)
- The World's Greatest First Love: Valentine Arc (2014)
- Ongaku Shōjo (2015)
- Meiji Tokyo Renka the Movie: Serenade of the Crescent Moon (2015)
- Meiji Tokyo Renka the Movie: Fantasia of the Flower Mirror (2016)
- Why We Live: The Priest Rennyo and the Yoshizaki Fire (2016)
- Ao Oni: The Animation (2017)
- The World's Greatest First Love: Proposal Arc (2020)
- Pretty Guardian Sailor Moon Eternal The Movie (2021, with Toei Animation)
- The Seven Deadly Sins: Cursed by Light (2021)
- Pretty Guardian Sailor Moon Cosmos The Movie (2023, with Toei Animation)
- Sasaki and Miyano: Graduation (2023)
- Gekijōban Collar × Malice Deep Cover (2023)
- Shiboyugi: Playing Death Games to Put Food on the Table – 44: Cloudy Beach (2026)
