= Shungiku Nakamura =

Japanese manga artist

Shungiku Nakamura 中村 春菊
- Area: Manga artist
- Notable works: Junjo Romantica: Pure Romance, Sekai-ichi Hatsukoi

Shungiku Nakamura (中村 春菊, Nakamura Shungiku; born December 13, 1980) is a Japanese manga artist. She is most famous for creating Junjo Romantica: Pure Romance. Nakamura's distinct style of manga has been identified largely throughout Japanese and English yaoi fanbases. Her works usually include large age gaps between the characters, who often have careers in the publishing industry (as depicted in Junjo Romantica and Sekai-ichi Hatsukoi). She often cowrites with Fujisaki Miyako, who authored the novels of Yoshino Chiaki no baai in Sekai-ichi Hatsukoi.

== Works ==
- Junjo Romantica: Pure Romance (2002–present)
- "Junjou Mistake" (2008)
- Hybrid Child (2003–2004)
- Sekai-ichi Hatsukoi (2006–present)
- "√W.P.B." (2004)
- "Touzandou Tentsui Ibun" (1998–1999)
- "Mangetsu Monogatari"
- "Tsuki wa Yamiyo ni Kakuru ga Gotoku" (1999)
- "Picturesque of a Mask" (art only)
- "Umi ni Nemuru Hana"
