= List of You and Idol Pretty Cure episodes =

- Season 22
- No. of episodes: 49

Release
- Original network: ANN (ABC TV, TV Asahi)
- Original release: February 2, 2025 – January 25, 2026

Series chronology
- ← Previous; Wonderful Pretty Cure! Next → Star Detective Precure!

You and Idol Pretty Cure is the twenty-second television anime series in Izumi Todo's Pretty Cure franchise, produced by Toei Animation. The series premiered in Japan on February 2, 2025, succeeding Wonderful Pretty Cure! in its timeslot, and aired until January 25, 2026, being succeeded by Star Detective Precure!. The opening theme, "You and Idol Precure♪ Light Up!" (Japanese: キミとアイドルプリキュア♪ Light Up!, Hepburn: Kimi to Aidoru Purikuya♪ Light Up!), is performed by Ami Ishii, Chihaya Yoshitake, and Akane Kumada, and the ending theme, "Trio Dreams", is performed by Misato Matsuoka, Minami Takahashi, and Natsumi Takamori while the second ending theme is "Lulala With You" (キミとルララ) performed by Matsuoka, Takahashi, Takamori, Yoshino Nanjō and Miharu Hanai.

== Episodes ==
No.	Title (Note: English titles are taken from Crunchyroll.)	Directed by	Written by	Animation directed by	Art	Original release date
1	"Cure Idol Debuts!"; Transliteration: "Kirakkiranran! Kyua Aidoru Debyū!" (Japanese: キラッキランラン♪キュアアイドルデビュー！)	Chiaki Kon	Yōichi Katō	Yukiko Ueda	Nian Chen Tong	February 2, 2025
In Hanamichi Town, while walking by the river with her dog Kyutarou, Uta Sakura discovers a peach-like object that opens to reveal a creature inside. The creature follows her back to her home, the coffee shop Cafe Glitter, where she attempts to tell her family what she saw; however, they believe it to be a stuffed animal because it fell asleep. While serving customers, including manga artist Ema, she notices that the creature has disappeared. In her room, it explains that it is the fairy Purirun, who has come to Earth to find the Idol Pretty Cure who can bring light to the darkness, and that they believe she has the potential to become one. After convincing her to search for potential candidates, they search around town, but do not find anyone. Meanwhile, at Team Chokkiri's headquarters, Chokkirine sends Cutty to steal humans' Kirakira. As Purirun explains to Uta that Team Chokkiri plunged their homeland, KirakiLand, into darkness, Cutty attacks, stealing Ema's Kirakira and transforming her into a Makkuranda. Uta's resolve to save Ema grants her the Idol Heart Brooch and Pretty Cure Ribbon, allowing her to transform into Cure Idol. After purifying the Makkuranda with Idol Smiling, Uta realizes that she is now a Pretty Cure.
2	"Suddenly Popular! Mystery New Idol"; Transliteration: "Watashi, bazu tchatteru!?" (Japanese: 私、バズっちゃってる！？)	Directed by : Yōichi Katō; Storyboarded by : Kazuki Yokouchi	Kazuki Yokouchi	Mikio Fujiwara	Eiji Hamano	February 9, 2025
Following Idol's battle with the Makkuranda, she goes viral on social media due to Purirun filming and uploading her performance, wanting others to see it. They are contacted by Queen Pikarine, who explains to them that KirakiLand's inhabitants once lived happily until Darkine invaded and cut the Big Kirakira Ribbon, plunging it into darkness and sealing them in crystals. She tells Uta that she must collect the Kirarun Ribbons, which can restore KirakiLand, while keeping her identity as a Pretty Cure a secret from others and from Darkine, as they do not know what her plans are. At school, Kokoro establishes the Cure Idol Research Club, which Uta's classmate, Mikoto, wants to join. Fujimi, their homeroom teacher, asks for suggestions for the welcome party for the first-year students; Uta suggests choir, while Nana, whom she invites to have lunch with her, says that she will play the piano. On their way home from school, Cutty attacks, stealing Mikoto's Kirakira and transforming her into a Makkuranda. While fighting it, Idol becomes reckless after taking pride in her newfound popularity, but regains her resolve after defending Purirun, who is hurt by Cutty's insults. After purifying the Makkuranda with Idol Smiling, Idol tells Mikoto to continue supporting her while recognizing her new role as a savior.
3	"Have Courage! Cure Wink Debuts!"; Transliteration: "Yūki o Dashite! Kyua Uinku Debyū!" (Japanese: 勇気を出して♪キュアウインクデビュー！)	Directed by : Tsuyoshi Tobita; Storyboarded by : Chiaki Kon	Chiaki Kon	Makoto Ozawa & Keisuke Katayama	Natsuko Tosugi	February 16, 2025
Following choir practice, Uta invites Nana to walk home from school with her, but she tells her that she has to practice for a piano competition the next day. The next day, during choir practice, Nana messes up playing the piano after being reminded of a mistake she made during the competition. While eating lunch together, Nana confides in Uta about her mistake and Uta attempts to cheer her up with her song, but accidentally reveals that she is Cure Idol; however, Nana promises to keep her secret while revealing that she witnessed her fight as Cure Idol. After school, Uta brings Nana over to her house, where, after being shown a photo of them together, she remembers that they met when they were younger and played piano together, with Uta teaching her to wink in order to boost her confidence. Nana plays piano with Hamori before returning home, where she reflects on her fear of not living up to expectations despite her talent. Meanwhile, Chokkirine sends Zakkuri to steal Kirakira after learning from Darkine that they will receive a special bonus. As Hamori is heading to the welcome party, Zakkuri attacks, stealing her Kirakira and transforming her into a Makkuranda. While fighting the Makkuranda, it traps Idol in a cage; despite her telling Nana to run away, she refuses, noting that she gave her courage while Hamori helped her regain her love for playing piano. Her courage and resolve to help Idol grants her a Idol Heart Brooch and Pretty Cure Ribbon, allowing her to transform into Cure Wink. After she purifies the Makkuranda with Wink Crescendo, she and Uta perform at the party together while vowing to work together as Cures.
4	"The Legendary Idol?! Kaito Hibiki"; Transliteration: "Rejendo Aidoru!? Hibiki Kaito" (Japanese: レジェンドアイドル！？ 響カイト)	Emi Tezuka	Akiko Inoue	Katsumi Tamegai & Hiroshi Numata	Yuki Nakabayashi	February 23, 2025
While Nana is performing at Cafe Glitter, she and Uta learn that, just like Idol, Wink has gone viral on social media because Purirun uploaded her performance. However, Uta tells her that her favorite idol is Kaito Hibiki, who is known and loved all over the world. Suddenly, Kaito arrives to visit the cafe, having studied singing in New York before going on hiatus to study abroad. As Uta's family leaves to get supplies, Nana and Kaito help her serve the customers, with Nana telling her that this is an opportunity to see him at work and learn what is important to him. However, as they serve customers, Uta begins to become jealous of his skill, which she learns is due to him playing a waiter on the show "The Waiter Saw". After Uta's family returns, Kaito leaves after telling Uta and Nana that what he values is being someone who people will want to see and look forward to seeing again. As a cafe customer is heading home, Cutty attacks, stealing her Kirakira and transforming her into a Makkuranda. After Idol purifies the Makkuranda with Idol Smiling, she and Kaito perform together at the beach, where he used to perform before leaving for New York, and is able to properly thank him for his help; after he leaves, a mysterious manager approaches Uta and Nana, saying that he knows of their identities as Cures.
5	"We Got A Manager!"; Transliteration: "Manējā-san, Tsuichatta!" (Japanese: マネージャーさん、ついちゃった！)	Directed by : Tomoki Watanabe; Storyboarded by : Noriyo Sasaki	Yuka Yamada	Mitsuru Aoyama	Zhuxing Xu	March 2, 2025
The manager visits Cafe Glitter, where Nana and Uta wonder if he learned of their identities as Cures by watching their performances. However, after contacting Pikarine, who learns that Nana has become a Cure, they learn that he is Tanakhan, a fairy from KirakiLand and Purirun's friend, who she sent to aid them as their manager. Though Purirun doubts that they are the same person, Tanaka proves his identity by petting Purirun in the same way he did. While taking them to the KirakiLand Branch Office in Hanamichi Town, he tells them that he works there and has disguised himself as a human while on Earth. There, though Uta and Nana believe that he will be their manager as idols, he reminds them of their mission to save KirakiLand, which he will support them in. After receiving a message from Koharu Mori, who is in charge of advertising for Pretty Holic, asking them to appear in a commercial for its spring lipstick campaign due to a new store being opened in Hanamichi Town, Tanaka agrees to help them under the guise of them being managers in training. There, Koharu tells them that she has loved Pretty Holic since she was a child and now seeks to use it to bring joy to others. While out in town, Uta encounters Kaito and asks him for advice on being an idol by asking about his first job, which he reveals was a cosmetics ad. During the photoshoot, Idol is nervous until Mori suggests she look at her rather than the cameras, after which it goes successfully. However, during the shoot, Zakkuri attacks, stealing Koharu's Kirakira and transforming her into a Makkuranda. After Wink purifies the Makkuranda with Wink Crescendo, Pretty Holic receives an influx of new customers due to the commercial, while Uta learns from Kaito that what he valued when he first began his career was wanting to make others smile. Afterwards, Tanaka begins working at Cafe Glitter part-time in order to be close to the Cures and support them.
6	"My Heart's Going Kyun-Kyun?!"; Transliteration: "Kokoro Kyunkyun Shitemasu!?" (Japanese: 心キュンキュンしてます！？)	Yutaka Tsuchida	Yōichi Katō	Seiji Masuda	Shota Suzuki	March 9, 2025
After street dancing, Kokoro returns home to eat breakfast with her family before leaving for school. There, Mikoto informs Uta and Nana that the Cure Idol Research Club has been renamed to the Cure Idol and Cure Wink Research Club. They also meet Kokoro, the president of the club, and Purirun secretly attends their club meeting during lunch after taking an interest in it and wanting to befriend her. During the meeting, Kokoro vows to figure out why her heart goes "kyun-kyun" when she sees Cure Idol and Cure Wink; after the meeting, she declines club member Sunda's invitation to join the Dance Club before going to an idol store, where she encounters Purirun and believes it to be a stuffed animal. Despite Purirun's attempt to hide the fact they are a fairy, she deduces that they know the Cures from their appearance in the Pretty Holic commercial. In return for knowing their identity, she asks Purirun to arrange a meeting between her and the Cures so she can get their autograph. After meeting with them, she realizes that she has admired them since she first saw Cure Idol's performance and that the reason her heart was going "kyun-kyun" was because she wanted to be like the Cures and stand on the same stage as them. Seeing her potential and believing that she could become a Pretty Cure, Purirun gives her the remaining Idol Heart Brooch. Meanwhile, in town, Cutty attacks, stealing a gardener's Kirakira and transforming them into a Makkuranda. Though Idol purifies it with Idol Smiling, Kokoro, having realized their identities as Cures and that being a Cure requires fighting, declares that her heart is no longer going "kyun-kyun".
7	"Dancing Heart! Cure Kyun-Kyun's Debut!"; Transliteration: "Kokoro Odoru! Kyua Kyun-Kyun Debyū!" (Japanese: 心おどる♪キュアキュンキュンデビュー！)	Hanako Ueda	Yōichi Katō	Hitomi Matsuura	Takashi Kurahashi	March 23, 2025
Kokoro returns her Idol Heart Brooch to Purirun, saying that she should never have said she wanted to become a Cure. Though Purirun believes it is their fault for trying to recruit her, as the Cures seemed to be normal idols, Tanaka reassures them to believe in her, as her Kirakira, though faded, will not fade so easily. That night, as Kokoro discards her merchandise of the Cures, Uta and Purirun decide to talk to her. The next day, after school, they meet Kokoro's grandmother, who tells them that she has been dancing since she was young, when her father died. They then meet with Kokoro at the spot where she street dances, where she admits that, as much as she admires the Cures, she cannot become one herself and should forget about them. However, she regains her resolve after they tell her that it is unhealthy to hold her feelings in and she realizes that, though she tried to distract herself by dancing, she was unable to forget about the Cures. Meanwhile, Chokkirine, having heard from Cutty about the possibility of Kokoro becoming a Cure, sends Zakkuri to prevent it from happening. Zakkuri sets up a fake Pretty Cure concert in order to lure out Kokoro before stealing Sunda's Kirakira and transforming him into a Makkuranda. Kokoro's resolve to fight alongside the Cures, even if it means fighting, grants her a Idol Heart Brooch and Pretty Cure Ribbon, allowing her to transform into Cure Kyun-Kyun. After purifying the Makkuranda with Kyun-Kyun Beat, she declares that she will fight alongside the Cures while aiming to one day surpass them, also telling them to call her Kokoro.
8	"Sleepover! Idol Precure Study Session!"; Transliteration: "Minna de Otomari! Aidoru Purikyua Dai Kenkyū!" (Japanese: みんなでお泊り！アイドルプリキュア大研究！)	Kazuya Kitō	Yuniko Ayana	Yūki Kitajima	Natsuko Tosugi	March 30, 2025
At school, Kokoro asks Uta and Nana to let her study them, as, now that she is a Cure, she can ask them questions directly rather than studying them as a fan. After being reminded of their mission by Pikarine, who learns of Kokoro having become a Cure after Purirun uploaded her performance, Uta decides to have a sleepover at her house after they go out to town to buy mackerel and pork curry. Following a photoshoot in order for Kokoro to see how the Cures can be "Kirakira" on stage, she reveals that it was to see their costumes up close so she can sew clothes for figures she made based on them. After realizing that she did not make one for Kyun-Kyun, they finish the photoshoot and make one for her. However, this upsets Purirun, who Kokoro realizes she caused to feel left out because they are not matching with the Cures. Meanwhile, Chokkirine sends Zakkuri to attack in order to make up for his previous failure in preventing Kokoro from becoming a Cure. The next morning, he attacks, stealing a runner's Kirakira and transforming her into a Makkuranda, and, with Purirun's encouragement, Kyun-Kyun fights the Makkuranda until Idol and Wink arrive. After she purifies the Makkuranda with Kyun-Kyun Beat, she apologizes to Purirun, saying that, though she still has much to learn as a Cure, she was able to fight because of their encouragement. Afterwards, at her suggestion, they make a bag for Uta to carry Purirun in so that they do not have to hide and are less lonely, as well as a costume to match Idol.
9	"The Seven Wonders of Nana!"; Transliteration: "Nana no Nana Fushigi!" (Japanese: ななの七不思議！)	Tako Iwai	Directed by : Akiko Inoue; Storyboarded by : Noriyo Sasaki	Yuka Takemori, Nobuhito Akada & Joey Calangian	Yuki Nakabayashi	April 6, 2025
While cutting carrots with Hajime, Nana receives a call from Mutsumi and tells her about their sleepover. The next day, as Uta and Kokoro are walking to school, Uta is about to ask her for help with a math test the next week when they notice that she is acting strangely, as she is only walking on the white line. After Nana raps about math when Uta asks her for help, she and Kokoro decide to investigate, calling it "The Seven Wonders of Nana". At Cafe Glitter, Kokoro decides to join Uta in her study session, as, though first-year students do not have a math test, she is curious about it. As they study, Nana joins them, wearing her hair in twintails and ending sentences with "nana" before changing her hairstyle back to normal and teaching Uta in a mix of Japanese and English. As Kokoro suspects that Nana's strange behavior is because of her having a "favorite", she plays with Hamori by pretending to be a monster. After Nana leaves, Uta and Kokoro decide to follow her, with Kokoro now believing that her behavior is due to her piano practice. As Chokkirine sends Zakkuri to steal Kirakira due to Cutty having caught a cold, in town, Nana gives a thank-you letter to town mascot Hanami-chan before heading to the beach, where she draws in the sand what they think is a magic circle. There, Zakkuri attacks, stealing Hanami-chan's Kirakira and transforming them into a Makkuranda. After purifying the Makkuranda with Wink Crescendo, Nana explains to Uta and Kokori that her behavior was because, since becoming a Cure and meeting new people, she realized how narrow her world had been; with Mutsumi's advice, she aimed to try new things besides piano. She then reveals that she had been drawing sand art of her, Uta, Kokoro, and Purirun, and that since she met them, every day has been fun. She then vows to continue turning new pages in life, though Uta flunks the math test despite her help, believing it to be because of bad luck caused by the Seven Wonders.
10	"CD Debut! Idol Precure!"; Transliteration: "CD Debyū! Aidoru Purikyua!" (Japanese: CDデビュー！アイドルプリキュア！)	Hideki Hiroshima	Directed by : Yuka Yamada; Storyboarded by : Kazuki Yokouchi	Seung Hee Han, Akira Takeuchi, Shin'ya Nogami, Shinichi Suzuki, Ippei Masui & Mai Ishii	Zhuxing Xu	April 13, 2025
At the KirakiLand Branch Office, Tanaka informs the Cures that a record company has asked them to record their songs to put onto a CD. On the day of recording, Idol and Wink are able to record their songs, but Kyun-Kyun's nerves prevent her from recording; however, she is able to with the Cures' encouragement. After the CD is released in stores under the group name "Idol Pretty Cure", while at school Kokoro learns from Mikoto of her meeting with Idol and her desire to meet Kyun-Kyun. At her suggestion, Kokoro decides to hold a handshake event where fans can meet the Cures; while heading to the event, she meets a girl named Miyu and her mother, who are fans of Kyun-Kyun. However, during the event, Cutty attacks after infiltrating the event disguised as a fan, stealing Miyu and her mother's Kirakira and transforming them into a Makkuranda. Though Kyun-Kyun doubts that she can defeat the Makkuranda despite wanting to save Miyu, Idol and Wink reassure her, telling her that the event would not have happened without her. After Kyun-Kyun purifies the Makkuranda with Kyun-Kyun Beat, the event resumes and Miyu and her mother get to meet her, and she is overjoyed after Miyu says that her heart is going "kyun-kyun".
11	"Trio Dreams"	Tsuyoshi Tobita	Directed by : Yōichi Katō; Storyboarded by : Koji Ogawa	Akira Inagami & Yukiko Ueda	Miki Imani	April 20, 2025
At school, a lunch broadcast by Mio of the Broadcasting Club asks the question "What is your dream?" While Nana's and Kokoro's dreams are to be a pianist and a dancer, respectively, Uta is unsure of what her dream is, as, though she likes to sing, she does not believe it to be her dream. Believing it to be working at Cafe Glitter with her family, she helps them serve customers for the day. That night, Oto tells her that starting a cafe was her dream, which Kazu says they made come true because they wanted it to. Though she is happy Uta wants to work at the cafe, she tells her to find her own dream, something that she truly loves doing. The next day, Nana and Kokoro attempt to help Uta find her dream by telling her about various jobs; however, she ultimately decides to choose her dream on her own after realizing that she has already achieved her supposed dream of being an idol by being a Cure. After meeting with Kaito by the shore, who tells her that dreams are not something she can pursue alone, she decides what her dream is. However, before she can tell Nana and Kokoro what it is, Chokkirine, upset at Cutty and Zakkuri's inability to defeat the Cures, accompanies them in stealing the Kirakira of Mio and two of her classmates, transforming them into Makkuranda. As the Cures split up to fight them, Uta declares that her dream is to be a Cure alongside Wink and Kyun-Kyun, performing on the same stage. Their resolve grants them a new attack, High Emotion, allowing them to purify the Makkuranda. Afterwards, the heart-shaped tree overlooking Hanamichi Town produces a peach, which opens to reveal a fairy who declares that the world is brilliant because her sister, Purirun, is in it.
12	"Purirun's Fan, Meroron is Here!"; Transliteration: "Purirun Daisuki, Meroron ga Yattekita!" (Japanese: プリルン大好き メロロンがやってきた！)	Hana Shinohara	Akiko Inoue	Mika Hironaka & Makoto Ozawa	Eiji Hamano	April 27, 2025
While wondering why the tree continues to bloom, theorizing that it is related to the emergence of the Cures, Tanaka notices a dog barking at something in the bushes. Bringing it back to Cafe Glitter, Purirun recognizes it as the same peach she used to arrive in Hanamichi Town, which Tanaka tells them is a MOMO: a vehicle that inhabitants of KirakiLand use to travel to Earth, meaning that someone must have come to Earth from there. He reveals that the Heart Tree, the symbol of Hanamichi Town, is connected to KirakiLand, with a peach forming when one travels through KirakiLand's gate and a gap in space-time is formed. However, since KirakiLand's inhabitants were sealed in crystals and he has no way of contacting Pikarine, he is unsure who it could be. Purirun realizes that they must be Meroron, who escaped along with them when Darkine attacked; however, since the gate only had enough power to send one person, Pikarine entrusted Purirun with the task of finding the Pretty Cure, with Meroron following after Purirun when the gate reacted to her desire to be with her. As the Cures search for Meroron, who goes viral on social media as a "flying rabbit", Darkine contacts the generals, giving them her power and upgrading the crystals used to summon Makkuranda. Learning from Arisu, a girl who had encountered Meroron, that a crow took her to the top of a tree, Purirun decides to save her, knowing that she gets lonely easily, but chose to come to Earth regardless. As they reunite in the park and Purirun introduces her to the Cures, with Kokoro giving her fortune-telling gummies that predict increased friendship luck, Zakkuri attacks, stealing the Kirakira of a boy at a vending machine and transforming him into a Kurayaminda. After the Cures purify the Kurayaminda with High Emotion, Meroron declares the Cures as her rivals for Purirun's friendship while deciding to live at Uta's house to be with her.
13	"Go! Go! Kirakilight!"; Transliteration: "Fureffure! KirakiRaito!" (Japanese: フレッフレッ！キラキライト！)	Takayuki Murakami	Yuka Yamada	Mitsuru Aoyama	Natsuko Tosugi	May 4, 2025
In the morning, Uta is awakened by Meroron, who is angry that she is next to Purirun instead of her. Though Uta struggles to wake up, she is able to with Purirun and Meroron cheering her on. At school, they encounter Wakaba, who Kokoro believes is in love with Shota, the star of the school's volleyball team and the most popular boy at school, because her heart goes "kyun-kyun". Having chosen their sports for the upcoming ball-game tournament, in which they play against other classes and each team is allowed one player from the school team for their sport, Uta and Nana meet with their volleyball team. However, they notice that Wakaba, who was chosen to represent their district along with Shota, blushes when Shota is mentioned. Meeting with Nana and Kokoro at her house, Uta admits that she has not been in love with anyone before, though has experience with love. After Tanaka informs them that Cafe Glitter is busy, she serves Kaito and attempts to ask him if he has been in love before, but he says it is a secret. Later, during volleyball practice at school, Wakaba admits her love for Shota to her teammates after he retrieves the ball for her, but reveals that she overheard her classmates saying that he will be transferring schools soon. Despite wanting to confess her feelings for him before he leaves, she is afraid he will reject her; however, with Nana's encouragement, she decides that she will if they win the tournament. After defeating Kokoro's team, Uta's team advances to the finals between Year 2 Class A and Year 3 Class A. However, during the tournament, Cutty attacks, stealing Wakaba's Kirakira and transforming her into a Kurayaminda. During the battle, Idol struggles due to previously injuring her wrist, but with Purirun and Meroron cheering the Cures on, they purify the Kurayaminda with High Emotion. Afterwards, Uta's team wins the tournament and she confesses to Shota; though he rejects her, after her classmate Fujino congratulates her on the victory, they believe that she may have found a new love.
14	"Dear Mom, A Message From Kokoro"; Transliteration: "Okāsan e ~Kokoro Kara no Messēji~" (Japanese: お母さんへ ～こころからのメッセージ～)	Yūya Nomoto	Chiaki Inaba	Mikio Fujiwara	Yuki Nakabayashi	May 11, 2025
On Mother's Day, Kokoro sees Ai off to work before buying her a carnation and a message card, but is unsure what to write. Going to Cafe Glitter for advice, while Uta suggests writing "Thanks for everything", Kokoro feels that it is not enough to convey her feelings. After Nana suggests remembering a time with Ai that made her heart go "kyun-kyun", Kokoro thanks them for their help before leaving; after noting that the surprise they planned is safe for now, they explain Mother's Day to Purirun, while Tanaka explains how KirakiLand's inhabitants are born from a tree showered in Kirakira by the Big Kirakira Ribbon. After remembering when Ai picked her up from school, Kokoro decides to pick her up from work in order to give her the gift; however, there, Zakkuri attacks, stealing Ai's Kirakira and transforming her into a Kurayaminda. During the fight, Kyun-Kyun's determination to save Ai and thank her for all that she has done for her allows her to use a more powerful version of Kyun-Kyun Laser to fend off the Kurayaminda's attack, leaving it vulnerable. After purifying it with High Emotion, Kokoro returns home, where the Cures and her family reveal that they threw a surprise birthday party for her, which was Uta's idea after Ai bought appetizers from Cafe Glitter. After receiving gifts—a Pretty Up Fragrance from Uta and Nana, and an Idol Pretty Cure CD from her grandparents—Kokoro gives the carnation to Ai, telling her how her plans for Mother's Day did not work out. However, she tells Kokoro that she is happy to know that she was thinking of her and to spend time with her, and that she is her parents' treasure. After Meroron thanks Purirun for everything, which she wanted to tell her despite them not being related, everyone takes a group photo together.
15	"Operation Make Sissy Fall in Love"; Transliteration: "Nētama Meromero Daisakusen Mero~" (Japanese: ねえたまメロメロ大作戦メロ～)	Takao Iwai	Directed by : Yuniko Ayana; Storyboarded by : Koji Ogawa	Ken Ueno	Zhuxing Xu	May 18, 2025
In the morning, Uta awakens to find Purirun entangled in Meroron's ears, which Meroron explains she did to prevent Purirun from sleepwalking over to Uta's bed and sleeping with her. Though Purirun suggests that they sleep together, Meroron declares her feelings for Purirun, and, upon seeing her and Uta together, is angered and feels that Uta is stealing her away from her. At Cafe Glitter, Meroron explains that she wants to go on a date with Purirun in order to make her fall in love with her, but is unable to truly be alone with her because of Uta serving them cream soda and Nana and Kokoro watching them. After Meroron is angered when Uta suggests that she and Purirun are by each other's side every day and refuses to reveal why she loves Purirun, the Cures decide to learn more about her. They are contacted by Pikarine, who learns of Meroron's arrival in Hanamichi Town and explains that she is a deep thinker who often spends time alone, spinning ideas into poems and unable to be Kirakira like others, while Purirun recalls how she often read books alone, despite her attempts to get her to open up. Realizing that the "dark, dark ice" that was melted by warmth in Meroron's poem must refer to her and Purirun, the Cures decide to support Meroron on her date. After dressing them in matching outfits based on Idol, Nana suggests a date spot at the Heart Tree, which has a nearby spot where lovers and friends tell each other their most precious thing. Meanwhile, Zakkuri confronts Cutty after figuring out that he is a fan of the Cures, and Cutty explains that he has been a fan since he first saw their performance and, though he does not know why he is drawn to them, wants to see their Kirakira again. However, as a member of Team Chokkiri, he knows of his duty, and leaves to steal Kirakira. At the Heart Tree, Meroron tells Purirun that she is her most precious thing, as, after they fled Darkine's attack on KirakiLand, Purirun reassured her that they would be okay as long as they had each other, which was the first time she did not feel alone. Nearby, Cutty attacks, stealing the Kirakira of a couple, Jou and Kii, and transforming them into a Kurayaminda. During the fight, Cutty, envious of Purirun and Meroron cheering on the Cures, which he also wants to do, orders the Kurayaminda to capture them in a chest, though they are freed after he willingly gives the Cures the key. After the Cures purify the Kurayaminda with High Emotion, Purirun thanks Meroron for the date and she kisses her; that night, Meroron pulls out a treasure chest containing the Heart Kirari Lock, which lovers use to pledge their love to each other, before getting angry at Uta once more after seeing her with Purirun.
16	"Full Bloom! Intensive Practice! The Hanamichi Town Festival!"; Transliteration: "Mankai! Tokkun! Hanamichi Taun Fesu!" (Japanese: 満開！特訓！はなみちタウンフェス！)	Yuuna Hirosue	Akiko Inoue	Seiji Masuda & Hiroshi Numata	Shota Suzuki	May 25, 2025
While Uta cleans Cafe Glitter, Meroron wonders if what she possesses truly is the Heart Kirari Lock, as, if it is, she will be able to have eternal love like the legends say. With the Cures at the top of their game due to Purirun uploading their performance, Tanaka informs them that they have received a request to perform at the yearly Hanamichi Town Festival, which Uta accepts. After being reminded that she is also part of the team, Purirun decides to help make the festival a success. At the Cures' request, Tanaka comes up with a plan for intensive practice in preparation for the festival, including strength training on the beach and practicing pleasing the crowd a thousand times. After finishing training, that night, Purirun is practicing winks and poses when she tells Uta that she originally came to Hanamichi Town in order to find the Cures and save KirakiLand. However, life with the Cures has made every day Kirakira, and them including her as a Cure has made her happy; along with Uta, she vows to work hard. The next day, Tanaka sets up a dance studio in his house, and Uta gives Purirun and Meroron spoons so that they can sing like her. Meanwhile, as both Cutty and Zakkuri have a cold, Chokkirine sends Cutty to steal Kirakira because his cold is less severe, but he is torn between his duty to Team Chokkiri and stealing Kirakira and his admiration for the Cures. He is attracted to the Cures' Kirakira, but, after seeing their training and dedication to their performances, is unable to fight them and feels Kirakira within him. However, Darkine steals his Kirakira, transforming him into a monster called Cuttinda. While fighting him, Purirun is injured protecting Idol, and, though High Emotion fails to purify Cutty, Idol realizes that he is suffering and vows to save him. After Cutty regains control enough to refrain from attacking the Cures and retreats, that night, Meroron learns that the Heart Kirari Lock's true purpose is to grant a wish, while Purirun, distraught over her inability to help the Cures, decides to return to KirakiLand.
17	"Purirun's Decision! Let's go to KirakiLand!"; Transliteration: "Purirun no ketsui! Kiraki-Rando e Rettsu Gō!" (Japanese: プリルンの決意！キラキランドへレッツゴー！)	Hideki Hiroshima	Directed by : Yuka Yamada; Storyboarded by : Koji Ogawa & Ryuta Kawahara	Yoko Uchida, Keisuke Katayama & Natsumi Sakai	Chie Sato	June 1, 2025
Purirun and Meroron return to KirakiLand, as Purirun has an idea to help Uta. At the castle, Pikarine reveals that the Kirarun Ribbons are pieces of the Big Kirakira Ribbon, and, if all of them are gathered, the Ribbon will be restored and Team Chokkiri and their darkness will disappear. Meroron suggests using the Heart Kirari Lock to grant Purirun's wish, but Pikarine warns against using it, as, in exchange for granting a wish, one must give up what they value most, which is sealed inside the Lock. Meanwhile, Cuttinda is upgraded by Darkine's power and attacks as the Cures take the stage at the Hanamichi Town Festival, learning of Purirun and Meroron's departure from a video message that Purirun left behind. After the Ribbons that the Cures have gathered so far fail to restore the Ribbon, Purirun realizes that the Cures are in danger and vows to help them, as Uta has been there for her since they first met. Realizing that her memories of Uta are what she values most, Purirun decides to have her wish granted in order to protect her, even if it means giving those memories up, and she and Meroron activate the Lock. As the Cures struggle to fight Cuttinda, they are saved by two mysterious Cures, who introduce themselves as Cure Zukyoon and Cure Kiss. After they purify Cuttinda with Zukyoon Kiss Destiny, Cutty thanks the Cures for saving him despite what he has done, as, though Zukyoon and Kiss purified him, they had illuminated the darkness he was trapped in with Kirakira, and declares himself their number one fan. After Cutty leaves, Zukyoon and Kiss reintroduce themselves before leaving, and Idol is left awestruck by Zukyoon's performance.
18	"Who Are You? Zukyoon Through My Heart!"; Transliteration: "Kimi wa Dare!? Hāto Zukyūn Sarechatta" (Japanese: キミは誰！？ハートズキューンされちゃった)	Keitarou Nakajima	Directed by : Yōichi Katō; Storyboarded by : Keitarou Nakajima	Yuka Takemori, Nobuhito Akada & Noel Ano-Nuevo	Natsuko Tosugi	June 8, 2025
Overlooking Hanamichi Town, Zukyoon asks Kiss if it is called Hanamichi Town, and she realizes that Purirun has lost her memories of the town. After awakening from a dream of Zukyoon next to her in bed, Uta finds that she cannot stop thinking about her. At school, where Zukyoon and Kiss have gone viral under the name ZukyoonKiss after their performance was uploaded online, Nana realizes that Uta is acting strangely when her love for Zukyoon distracts her during class. After a meeting of the Idol Precure Research Club, Kokoro tells Uta that she has figured out that she is a fan of Zukyoon, having fallen in love with her at first sight. She explains to Uta how a person does fan activities to support their favorite and how being a fan can feel like a bottomless swamp, and has Uta and Nana join the Idol Precure Research Club. At Cafe Glitter, Uta helps with serving customers before doing her homework and walking Kyutarou, which Kokoro recognizes as her being a fan giving her energy. Meanwhile, Zakkuri learns from Chokkirine about Cutty falling to darkness and is sent to steal Kirakira, despite his anger about having to do all the work. Meeting with Nana and Kokoro, Uta wants to talk with Purirun about Zukyoon, but she and Meroron have still not returned from KirakiLand. Though they are worried about Purirun and Meroron, Tanaka tells them that he is returning to KirakiLand to meet with Pikarine, as he has not heard from her. In town, Zakkuri attacks, stealing the Kirakira of a fan of Kiss and transforming her into a Kurayaminda. After Zukyoon and Kiss purify the Kurayaminda with Zukyoon Kiss Destiny, Idol asks Zukyoon to be her friend. However, Kiss forbids Zukyoon from being friends with Idol and they leave, with Idol following after them.
19	"The Pair's Vow! Cure Zukyoon and Cure Kiss Debut!"; Transliteration: "Futari no Chikai! Kyua Zukyūn & Kyua Kissu Debyū!" (Japanese: ふたりの誓い♪キュアズキューン&キュアキッスデビュー！)	Kazuki Yokouchi	Yōichi Katō	Yukiko Ueda & Kenji Miuma	Yuki Nakabayashi	June 15, 2025
The Cures pursue Zukyoon and Kiss, but lose sight of them; as Idol wonders why they had to leave, she realizes that Zukyoon seems familiar to her. In town, Mikoto introduces them to Tsumugu Kijima, a journalist for the magazine "Entertainment Vroo-Vroom" who seeks to uncover the true identities of Zukyoon and Kiss for a special feature, and they decide to help her with the search. Realizing that they must have civilian identities like them, the Cures search around town, but do not find anyone who matches Uta's description; they also fear what could happen should Kijima uncover their secret, as it goes against Pikarine's warning that no one can know the Cures' identities. During the search, Uta spots Purirun in camera footage and pursues her to a back alley, where Zakkuri has attacked, stealing Kijima's Kirakira and transforming her into a Kurayaminda. In order to fight the Kurayaminda, Purirun and Meroron transform in front of the Cures, revealing themselves to be Zukyoon and Kiss. When Idol asks them how they became Cures, Kiss reveals that it was their wish that granted them Pretty Cure Ribbons and caused the spoons Uta gave them to become the Kirakira Showtime Mics. After Zukyoon and Kiss purify the Kurayaminda with Zukyoon Kiss Destiny, Kijima offers to interview them, which they accept. Afterwards, the Cures reunite with Purirun and Meroron, but Purirun does not remember Uta and leaves with Meroron.
20	"Puri! A Picnic to Find Memories!"; Transliteration: "Puri~! Omoide Sagashi no Pikunikku!" (Japanese: プリ～！思い出さがしのピクニック！)	Yutaka Tsuchida	Hiroko Kanasugi	Hitomi Matsuura	Zhuxing Xu	June 22, 2025
As the Cures are distraught that Purirun has forgotten Uta, but remembers Cure Idol, Tanaka returns from KirakiLand. He reveals to them that the sacrifice Purirun and Meroron made through the Heart Kirari Lock to become Cures caused Purirun to lose her memory of Uta and that what Pikarine had told Meroron about the Lock was the original legend surrounding it. He also reveals that Purirun's lost memories, which are of Uta and everything after they met and caused her to also forget Nana and Kokoro, will likely never return. However, while Pikarine had told Tanaka what Purirun had given up, which was her memories of Uta, she did not tell him what Meroron had given up. After meeting with Tanaka at his house, where Purirun and Meroron have been staying, and realizing that Purirun remembers him and other things from her past, Uta decides to take her and Meroron on a picnic to help her regain her memories of the Cures. However, despite their attempts to remind Purirun of their past experiences, Meroron tells them that nothing they try will work. Despite this, while riding to the summit of the mountain, Uta thanks Meroron for making Purirun's wish come true, despite the cost. At the summit, the Cures are eating lunch when Zakkuri attacks, stealing a runner's Kirakira and transforming him into a Kurayaminda. During the fight, Purirun cheers Idol on with the KirakiLight, but drops it when she and Meroron have to transform into Zukyoon and Kiss. After Zukyoon and Kiss purify the Kurayaminda with Zukyoon Kiss Destiny, as the Cures are heading down from the mountain, Purirun realizes that she left the KirakiLight behind. Uta leaves to retrieve it, hoping that it can help Purirun regain her memories; though she finds it, Uta collapses before she can give it to Purirun.
21	"Super-Duper! A Miracle in Unison!"; Transliteration: "Tobikkiri! Kiseki no Yunizon!" (Japanese: とびっきり！キセキのユニゾン！)	Masanori Sato	Directed by : Ichirou Okouchi; Storyboarded by : Takao Iwai	Mika Hironaka & Akira Inagami	Shota Suzuki	June 29, 2025
Nana and Kokoro come to Uta's house to visit, having gotten cakes for her; however, despite having recovered from her cold and happy to have found the KirakiLight, Uta is saddened when she goes to take a photo of the cakes and sees a photo of her and Purirun. Meanwhile, Nana and Kokoro go to Tanaka's house to ask Meroron about the Heart Kirari Lock in hopes of learning more about it, where Purirun has realized that she has forgotten something, but does not know what. However, Meroron tells them that it will take a miracle to restore Purirun's memories and, after seeing how the loss of her memories has saddened her, vows to help Purirun find what she has lost. Though distraught that Purirun has forgotten her, after Uta spills milk and receives a pep talk from Kazu, who tells her that it is okay to make mistakes now so that they are not made in the future, she regains her resolve. Visiting Tanaka's house, she takes a selfie with Purirun and vows to make new memories with her. There, Zakkuri, having received a special crystal from Chokkirine that affects KirakiLand fairies, attacks, stealing Purirun's Kirakira and transforming her into a Kurayaminda. The Kurayaminda turns Uta's Idol Heart Brooch to stone, preventing her from transforming into Cure Idol, but she refuses to give up. Her singing reaches Purirun, freeing her and causing her to regain her memories. After Zukyoon and Kiss purify the Kurayaminda with Zukyoon Kiss Destiny, Uta and Purirun reunite, with Uta declaring that they will be Cures together. However, Meroron, upset that she was not the one who rescued Purirun, declares that she and Purirun are the duo ZukyoonKiss and the Idol Pretty Cure's rivals.
22	"Idol Precure VS ZukyoonKiss?!"; Transliteration: "Aidoru Purikyua tai Zukyūn Kissu!?" (Japanese: アイドルプリキュアVS(たい)ズキューンキッス！？)	Ka Hee Im	Directed by : Chiaki Inaba; Storyboarded by : Ka Hee Im	Makoto Ozawa & Beom Seok Hong	Chie Sato	July 6, 2025
Despite Meroron's declaration of rivalry, Uta is confident that they can befriend her. As Purirun visits Cafe Glitter, Tanaka informs the Cures of a new job from Pretty Holic: a new campaign called "Idol Precure VS ZukyoonKiss, the Rivals' Showdown." At Pretty Holic, Koharu tells them that the campaign involves people choosing their favorite between two types of cosmetics: the Cute and Sweet Idol Pretty Cure Style or the Cool and Mature ZukyoonKiss Style. After they return from town, where the campaign has begun in full swing, Purirun, despite being part of ZukyoonKiss, joins the Idol Pretty Cure's side. In order to win over Purirun's heart, Meroron proposes a cooking battle between the teams that will take place the next week, with Purirun as the judge. Uta suggests making octopus sausages, Purirun's favorite food; however, to add variety, Nana proposes making a special menu that includes their favorite foods. While Meroron makes her own dish for Purirun, the Idol Pretty Cure make their dishes: Spaghetti Napolitan, Cafe Glitter's signature dish and Uta's favorite, with an omelette that has a drawing of Purirun and Meroron on top; rice balls, Kokoro's favorite; and bananas, Nana's favorite. On the day of the showdown, in town, Zakkuri attacks, stealing a girl's Kirakira and transforming her into a Kurayaminda. After Zukyoon and Kiss purify the Kurayaminda with Zukyoon Kiss Destiny, the cooking battle ends in a draw due to everyone enjoying the food. Though Meroron is upset that she was unable to win over Purirun's heart, during the photoshoot for the campaign, Kiss is happy after Zukyoon tells her that it is time for them to do their job as ZukyoonKiss. Afterwards, as the Cures wonder why Purirun and Meroron become more mature as Cures, Kaito watches the campaign from afar.
23	"This Is My Signature"; Transliteration: "Kore ga Watashi no Sain!" (Japanese: これが私のサイン！)	Kazuya Kitō	Yuniko Ayana	Yūki Kitajima	Natsuko Tosugi	July 13, 2025
At Tanaka's house, he informs the Cures that they have received a request to sign a poster of them, which will be the prize of a fan giveaway as part of a Pretty Holic campaign. However, despite Kokoro having come up with her own signature in case she would need it one day, Uta and Nana realize that they do not have a signature. As Kokoro explains how she made her signature by referencing other idols' signatures, including Kaito's, they learn that Kaito is resuming activities after having finished studying abroad, now basing himself in Japan and New York. After learning from Hamori that Kaito's fans, known as Kai-Pals, are frequenting Cafe Glitter after figuring out from his livestream that he visited there, they head there to help her out. After pulling him away from the crowd, Uta asks Kaito if he has been busy since he resumed activities, but he tells her that this was the reason he came to Cafe Glitter: in order to relax and because she is there. Later that day, after business has slowed down, Tanaka receives a call from Koharu, asking for Cure Idol to appear on television as part of a segment in an informative program promoting Pretty Holic lipstick. After filming the segment, while heading to the green room, Idol runs into Kaito, who has been curious about her ever since he first saw her performances and witnessed her fighting; though she claims the fight was a shoot for a TV show, he remains suspicious of her. He introduces her to Maruyama, his producer, and one of his staff, who is a fan of Idol. After Idol signs her signature for her, Kaito tells her that she has a long way to go as an idol, as, when she signed the signature, she looked down in silence rather than focusing on the fan; though her fans still like her, she must reconsider it if she wants to call herself an idol. The next day, as the Cures practice signatures, Uta is saddened by what Kaito told her; later, while serving herbal tea to Kaito, Mei, one of the Kai-Pals, asks Kaito to sign his signature for her. As she is heading home from Cafe Glitter, Zakkuri attacks, stealing Mei's Kirakira and transforming her into a Kurayaminda. After the Idol Pretty Cure purify the Kurayaminda with High Emotion, Mei asks Idol to sign her shirt for her, which she does. Idol is then approached by Kaito, who asks her if something happened there, which she denies; before leaving, she performs a crowd-pleaser for Kaito, which he is surprised by due to also being an idol.
24	"Tanakhan's Summer Holiday!"; Transliteration: "Tanakān no Natsuyasumi!" (Japanese: タナカーンの夏やすみ！)	Hideki Hiroshima	Directed by : Akiko Inoue; Storyboarded by : Noriyo Sasaki	Mikio Fujiwara	Yuki Nakabayashi	July 20, 2025
At Tanaka's house, he is interrupted in his morning routine by Purirun, who leaves for Uta's house to eat with her, with Meroron following after her. At Cafe Glitter, where the Cures have visited due to it being the first day of summer vacation, they learn that Tanaka has not had a summer vacation since he first arrived in Hanamichi Town over ten years ago. So that he can have a break, the Cures offer to take over his work for the day, with Uta helping at Cafe Glitter, Nana patrolling town, and Kokoro, Purirun, and Meroron sorting fan letters and presents to the Cures; however, Tanaka does not know what to do with his time off. While on patrol, Nana encounters Zakkuri, who has become exhausted from overwork, and offers to help him despite them being enemies; however, after she tells him to stop stealing Kirakira, he leaves after insisting that it is his job. Meanwhile, Tanaka, despite attempting to relax, finds that he cannot because he is too worried about the Cures. In town, Zakkuri attacks, stealing the Kirakira of a man at the hot springs and transforming him into a Kurayaminda. After the Idol Pretty Cure purify the Kurayaminda with High Emotion, Zakkuri retreats despite Wink being concerned for his health, declaring that he hates her. Afterwards, the Cures return to Uta's house, where Tanaka, having realized his purpose in helping the Cures, has outlined ideas for their future. Despite the Cures apologizing for giving him more work, he forgives them, saying that his job can only be done by him.
25	"Wink in a Field of Sunflowers"; Transliteration: "Himawari Hatake de Uinku Shite" (Japanese: ひまわり畑でウインクして)	Takayuki Murakami	Yuka Yamada	Ken Ueno	Zhuxing Xu	July 27, 2025
As she is playing the piano, Nana is unable to stop thinking about Zakkuri and is concerned for him. While Uta and Kokoro visit Nana's house, at Uta's suggestion, the Cures decide to visit the sunflower fields. On the way there, Nana tells Uta and Kokoro about what happened between her and Zakkuri; how she was shocked when he said that he hated her, but also thanked her, leading her to believe that he is not entirely evil and consider what she can do for him. Though she is afraid to try talking to Zakkuri, Uta and Kokoro support her, saying that it is like her to think of others, and she realizes that, prior to meeting them and becoming a Cure, she would have never considered that she could help Zakkuri or Cutty. However, Meroron tells her to not help Zakkuri, saying that light and darkness cannot mix. At the sunflower fields, they meet Hanae Natsuno, the owner of the fields, who tells them how, despite the hard work it requires, she loves seeing the flowers bloom and the joy they bring to others. Hearing about how she enjoys her job, Nana wonders if Zakkuri enjoys his job as Zakkuri arrives in Hanamichi Town, conflicted between his duty of stealing Kirakira and his admiration for Nana, afraid of what he will do if he sees her again. Seeing his struggle, a mysterious figure who has been watching Zakkuri says that it will be a problem for Darkine. While eating lunch, Nana leaves to walk in the fields and encounters Zakkuri, who attempts to return the handkerchief she gave him. However, the mysterious figure says that there is darkness even in light and takes Zakkuri's darkness, transforming him into a monster called Zakkurinda. Despite what Meroron had said, Wink vows to try talking to Zakkuri in order to save him. When she asks him why he joined Team Chokkiri, he admits that his inability to understand others' feelings has hurt them, including her, and that being a member of Team Chokkiri suits him more than Kirakira does. With the Cures' support, Wink purifies Zakkuri with Wink Crescendo; afterwards, Zakkuri leaves while declaring that he will be Wink's fan.
26	"The Kyun-er The Better!"; Transliteration: "Kyun Koso Mono no Jōzu Nare!" (Japanese: キュンこそものの上手なれ！)	Takao Iwai	Directed by : Hiroko Kanasugi; Storyboarded by : Kazuki Yokouchi	Noel Ano-Nuevo, Yuka Takemori & Rino Murayama	Shota Suzuki	August 3, 2025
After seeing a group of children playing and pretending to be the Cures, Kokoro proposes creating a fan club, which will allow more people to gather and experience their hearts going "kyun-kyun". After explaining to them what a fan club is and how its members would receive exclusive merchandise and attend special events, Tanaka agrees to help them establish the club, while they make merchandise and membership cards. At Tanaka's house, after a photoshoot for photos to make cards from, though Kokoro wants people to be able to choose from five different types, one for each member, there are also all-ins: people who support the entire group. In order to appeal to everyone, they instead make two types of cards: one card for Idol Pretty Cure and one for ZukyoonKiss. While making a newsletter and going through fan mail, Kokoro reveals that her favorite saying is "The stronger the love, the better you'll get", which means that if you love something, you can focus on it and improve. It was a saying that her father Shinji taught her while she was practicing a dance she learned at school, and her passion has allowed her to work hard at what she loves. After launching a website and creating a member registration system, they are nearly ready to start the club; however, in town, Chokkirine, forced to take action since Cutty and Zakkuri were purified, attacks, stealing the Kirakira of a store owner and transforming her into a Kurayaminda. With the Cures' support, Kyun-Kyun purifies the Kurayaminda with Kyun-Kyun Beat. Afterwards, as the Cures resume going through registrations, they realize that the first two members, Cuttin and Zakkurin, registered their address as KirakiLand as Cutty and Zakkuri visit to apply, revealing themselves to be Cuttin and Zakkurin: fairies from KirakiLand. That night, as Kokoro is glad to have started a successful fan club, Ai tells her that her talent is to like something so much that she can work hard at it, and she is happy after remembering Shinji's words.
27	"We Started A CureTube Channel!"; Transliteration: "Kyua Chūbu Hajimemashita!" (Japanese: キュアチューブはじめました！)	Tomoki Watanabe	Directed by : Chiaki Inaba; Storyboarded by : Yutaka Nakashima	Mai Ishii, Han Seung Hee, Shinichi Suzuki, Karen Nishiyama, Lin Gui Du, Xiao Yu Ting, Ami Konishi, Shin'ya Nogami, Ippei Masui, Aya Nasuno & Yoshie Anzai	Kana Arai	August 10, 2025
At Tanaka's house, while helping with going through applications and membership cards, Cuttin and Zakkurin explain how they joined Team Chokkiri: after they were criticized for being selfish and mean, respectively, Darkine amplified their inner darkness, granting them human forms and causing them to hate Kirakira. Remembering how watching videos of Cure Idol on CureTube helped him regain his Kirakira, Cuttin asks the Cures to make more videos so that he can experience more Kirakira. After uploading the first video to their CureTube channel, at Nana's suggestion, Uta decides that they make different kinds of videos: Zukyoon makes a video about cooking octopus sausages, Wink makes a video about video filming techniques, and Kiss makes a video where she expresses her feelings for Zukyoon. At school, where the videos have gone viral, Uta's classmates notice that she was in the background of the videos. Uta claims that she was merely passing by to hide her identity, but after school, she finds a letter in her locker from her classmate Utsurigi, who has fallen in love with her after seeing her in the videos and wants to meet her in person. While Uta is warned to be careful about not getting caught on camera, as the Cures are filming a call-and-response video, in town, Chokkirine attacks, stealing Utsurigi's Kirakira and transforming him into a Kurayaminda. After the Idol Pretty Cure purify the Kurayaminda with High Emotion, Uta later receives another letter from Utsurigi, saying that he has realized the one he truly loves is the Idol Pretty Cure and that he has become a dedicated viewer of their channel. The Cures vow to make more videos for him to watch, with Idol making a video of her fist-bumping the camera.
28	"Woof Woof! Together With Kyu-chan!"; Transliteration: "Wanwan! Kyū-chan to Issho ni!" (Japanese: わんわん！きゅーちゃんと一緒に！)	Chiaki Kon	Directed by : Akiko Inoue; Storyboarded by : Ryuta Kawahara	Yukiko Ueda & Keisuke Katayama	Natsuko Tosugi	August 17, 2025
The Cures, along with Tanaka, Kyutarou, and Uta's family, visit the home of Uta's grandfather, Heiji. Kyutarou was originally owned by Uta's grandparents and lived with them until Uta's grandmother, Atsuko, who had adopted him, died six years ago, after which he was sent to live with Uta's family. As they are taking a break after playing outside, Heiji asks Uta if she wants any of Atsuko's belongings, as he wants to clean up her room while he still can. However, Uta is saddened by her memories of Atsuko and that she cannot remember what happened after Atsuko consoled her following a fight she had with a friend, telling her to apologize and not be sad; she worries that, if they clean out Atsuko's room, she will continue to forget things. As they wonder how to make Uta feel better, Kyutarou shows them a photo of him, Uta, and Atsuko in the woods in front of three cedar trees, where Atsuko is said to have buried her treasure, which she claimed was something wonderful that could eliminate sadness. Though they uncover the treasure, there, Chokkirine attacks, stealing Kyutarou's Kirakira and transforming him into a Kurayaminda. During the fight, Idol finds the treasure, a ribbon spoon, and remembers what happened next; she and Atsuko had eaten pudding together, with her making the spoon and realizing that her singing makes sadness "kirakilala". This discovery and her memories of Atsuko and Kyutarou allow Idol to regain her resolve, and she purifies the Kurayaminda with Idol Smiling. Afterwards, Uta reveals that the treasure was a time capsule, with her and Atsuko burying it so that she could dig it up once she was older, with Heiji revealing that Atsuko had known she would die soon and wanted to leave it for when Uta would one day need it. After the 58th Sakura Family Karaoke Tournament is held, Heiji reflects on how he was glad to have sent Kyutarou to live with Uta and support her, though Meroron is upset by Purirun declaring that she and Uta are friends, believing that she only has Purirun. Before leaving, Uta promises to come back and help Heiji clean out Atsuko's room; on the way home, Kyutarou realizes that Uta can understand him as she vows to be friends with him forever.
29	"Meroron's Friend"; Transliteration: "Meroron no Tomodachi" (Japanese: メロロンのともだち)	Keitarou Nakajima	Directed by : Yōichi Katō; Storyboarded by : Keitarou Nakajima	Seiji Masuda	Yuki Nakabayashi	August 24, 2025
During a question-and answer-session at Pretty Holic, a young girl asks Wink if Idol Precure and ZukyoonKiss are friends, which the Cures except Kiss agree to. Afterwards, the Cures celebrate a successful event, but Kiss announces that they are not friends, transforms back to Meroron with Purirun, and flees. Back at Cafe Glitter, Uta, Nana, and Kokoro try to convince Meroron to be friends with them, but she refuses their offer, saying that she only has Purirun, and runs off to the library. After learning from Purirun of how Meroron started calling her "sissy" after she vowed to be her big sister during the attack on KirakiLand and that Meroron often goes to the library to be alone, Nana follows her there and helps her find a book called The Bond Ribbon. Nana then tells Meroron a story about how Uta helped her gain the confidence to become friends with the other children at her piano lessons and encourages Meroron to accept help when she needs it. Elsewhere in the library, Chokkirine borrows a book called "How to Keep Employees from Quitting" before noticing the librarian's Kirakira and stealing it, transforming her into a Kurayaminda. In order to fight the Kurayaminda, both Zukyoon and Kiss transform by themselves for the first time, with Zukyoon telling Kiss that she will always love her. After Zukyoon and Kiss purify the Kurayaminda with Zukyoon Kiss Destiny, Meroron and Nana borrow The Bond Ribbon and head outside. There, Meroron decides that she wants to be friends with the group and declares that she wants to get along with them; however, the Heart Kirari Lock appears and traps Meroron inside.
30	"Precure! Kirakila For You!"; Transliteration: "Purikyua! Kirakkiran・Fō・Yū!" (Japanese: プリキュア！キラッキラン・フォー・ユー！)	Yuuna Hirosue	Yōichi Katō	Katsumi Tamegai & Akira Inagami	Zhuxing Xu	August 31, 2025
In order to save Meroron, the Cures and Tanaka contact Pikarine to learn what Meroron sealed away in the Heart Kirari Lock to become Cure Kiss, and Pikarine reveals that it was her future with Purirun, so that she could be with Purirun forever. Pikarine also reveals that Meroron was born according to a legend in KirakiLand, stating that, when signs of darkness appear in the world, one who knows darkness would be born along with the Heart Kirari Lock. This caused her isolation, as KirakiLand's inhabitants only knew light and not darkness and could not understand how she felt; however, it also allowed her to understand the weight of losing what is precious to a person. At the time she made the wish, her idea of the future was uncertain, but after she decided what she wanted her future to be, the Lock activated. Though Pikarine does not know how to save Meroron, the Cures refuse to give up, with Nana believing that she may understand her current wish: to be friends with the Cures and stay with them forever. Meanwhile, at Team Chokkiri's headquarters, the mysterious figure introduces himself to Chokkirine as Jogi, claiming to be a new hire for Darkine. The Cures gather at the Heart Tree, where Nana explains how the premise of The Bond Ribbon, about five friends who part ways, but use ribbons as proof of their friendship, connecting their feelings even when they are apart, has allowed her to better understand Meroron's feelings. Uta's singing, along with Purirun's KirakiLight and the Cure's feelings, reach Meroron; however, Jogi attacks, having transformed Jou and Kii into Darkranda, monsters born from people's darkness. In the darkness, Meroron is confronted by Darkine, who attempts to recruit her, saying that they were born together and have a shared destiny. Meroron is then confronted by her inner darkness, who tells her that because she is darkness and light and darkness cannot mix, she cannot be friends with the Cures and will always be alone despite having Purirun, but Darkine will be there for her. However, Meroron refuses, saying that the one she cannot stand is herself, as she refused the Cures' friendship and was unable to communicate her feelings, which she wants to convey to everyone. Her resolve to be friends with the Cures resonates with them and frees her, and the Cures' combined resolve grants them new Pretty Cure Ribbons and the Kirakkiran Ribbon Baton, allowing them to use a new attack, Kirakkiran For You, to purify the Darkranda. Afterwards, Purirun and Meroron decide to move back into Uta's house, which she accepts, vowing to be with Meroron forever.
31	"Who's the Center of Idol Precure?!"; Transliteration: "Aidoru Purikyua no Sentā!?" (Japanese: アイドルプリキュアのセンター！？)	Yuuya Nomoto	Yuniko Ayana	Makoto Ozawa, Nobuhito Akada & Noel Ano-Nuevo	Shota Suzuki	September 7, 2025
With Idol Pretty Cure and ZukyoonKiss having become a single group, they once again go viral due to Purirun and Meroron uploading their performance online. As they are looking over the all-in membership cards for their fan club, Meroron asks why Cure Idol is in the center, which she had not noticed before, and Kokoro decides to have a battle to determine the group's center, which she describes as the person in the middle, who is the face of the group and influences their image. However, despite Kokoro's suggestions, with an odd number of people in the group, it is difficult to find a center who does not disrupt the group's balance and who everyone accepts; that night, Uta is left to wonder the possibility of someone else being the group's center and what it means for them to be accepted. The next day, Uta conducts a survey to see who people want to be the center, but still has to ask the Research Club and Tanaka. Learning that he is at the Precure Pretty Store, the Cures head there, where Tanaka has enlisted Cutty and Zakkuri to help him. and they vote for Idol and Wink, respectively; however, Tanaka is unable to choose due to being their manager. Meanwhile, Kaito sees a television broadcast on Booming! Hanamichi, featuring the Cures as guests in their first appearance as a five-person group, and sees that Wink is the center, with the Cures having decided to take turns being the center until an official decision is made. After the broadcast, Idol encounters Kaito, who had returned from a promotion for his new movie The Truth Behind The Mask, and asks him who he thinks the center should be. However, he tells her that no one can be the center alone and that she needs to look at the important people around her; if they look at each other, it will become clear who should be in the center. After the Cures see the movie, Uta tells them that she believes everyone is the center, and that their performance will be "kirakilala" regardless of who the center is. However, Jogi attacks, engulfing a moviegoer who spilled his popcorn in darkness and transforming him into a Darkranda; in order to protect the people inside the theater, Kiss summons the Heart Garden, a space where they can safely fight the Darkranda. During the fight, the Cures, seeing Idol's resolve to make others "kirakilala", decide that she should be the center. After the Cures purify the Darkranda with Kirakkiran For You, they attend the grand opening of the Precure Pretty Store; there, Idol encounters Kaito and vows to work hard as the group's center, while Kaito tells her to cherish the friends who accept her and to not lose her bonds.
32	"Puri! Mero! Dreamy School Life!"; Transliteration: "Puri! Mero! Yume no Gakuen Seikatsu" (Japanese: プリ！メロ！夢の学園生活)	Takao Iwai	Directed by : Hiroko Kanasugi; Storyboarded by : Noriyo Sasaki	Mitsuru Aoyama	Takashi Kurahashi	September 14, 2025
After reading the book The Sisters of Rose Hill Girls' High, about twin sisters going to high school, Meroron decides that she wants to go to school with Purirun. However, after realizing that they cannot go to school in their fairy or Cure forms, she decides that they will be like Tanaka and transform into humans, which he says requires refined maturity, and that the time may soon come for them. After training to become human, Purirun and Meroron cheer each other on; in response to their resolve, their KirakiLights become the Kirakkiran Ribbon Batons and grant them human forms, which Tanaka witnesses. The next morning at school, two new transfer students arrive, who Uta recognizes as Purirun and Meroron after remembering their wish and that they had gone to Tanaka's house and had not returned. Purirun and Meroron transfer as third-year students under the names Purin Tanaka and Meron Tanaka, while Fujimi hires physical education teacher Iku Mochida as a new student teacher. While Purirun and Meroron enjoy their school life, learning about math and literature and participating in activities like cooking and ping-pong, Mochida's nerves prevent him from teaching, which is worsened after he fails at his specialty, the vaulting horse, while Purirun and Meroron succeed. As the Cures are eating lunch, Purirun and Meroron tell them that they have decided what club they want to join, while Jogi, having received new power from Darkine, upgrades the crystals used to summon Kurayaminda, allowing Chokkirine to summon Darkranda as well. After joining the Idol Precure Research Club, Purirun and Meroron learn of Mochida's struggle and attempt to cheer him up; however, Mochida flees after having too much attention on him and Chokkirine attacks, engulfing him in darkness and transforming him into a Darkranda. After the Cures purify the Darkranda with Kirakkiran For You, Mochida overcomes his nerves and succeeds at the vaulting horse; after school, at Uta's house, Purirun and Meroron demonstrate that they can still transform into humans, and Meroron vows that their dream school life will continue.
33	"Dosukoi! An Idol Debut?"; Transliteration: "Dosuko~i! Aidoru Debyū!?" (Japanese: どすこ～い！アイドルデビュー！？)	Kazuki Yokouchi	Yuka Yamada	Mika Hironaka & Kenji Miuma	Natsuko Tosugi	September 21, 2025
While going through fan mail, Uta finds a letter from Kurikyuta, a sumo wrestler who she and Purirun had met while searching for Idol Pretty Cure candidates and who she mistook for being a Pretty Cure; the letter describes how the Cures give him the energy and motivation to make it through his training, even when he feels like giving up, and how he dreams of becoming a yokozuna. Out in town, the Cures encounter Kurikyuta, who recalls how he met Purirun, who nearly took him back to KirakiLand with her before realizing her mistake. He reveals that he has become a fan of the Cures, having received a membership card and becoming fan no. 8, and they decide to support him in his dream; however, he announces that he is quitting sumo to become an Idol Pretty Cure. Tanaka introduces himself to Kurikyuta and decides to train him, during which he shows off his talent for making mochi and chanko. The Cures note that these skills are unrelated to being an Idol Pretty Cure until Kurikyuta shows off his talent for singing, during which he trips and hurts his ankle. Despite encouragement from Chikara, a fan of Kurikyuta who also draws motivation from him and tells him not to quit, Kurikyuta reveals that he wants to quit due to previously having been injured as he was about to be promoted to the rank of Makushita, which is why he wrote the letter to the Cures. Though he wants to return to sumo, he has given up on that dream, as he does not want to repeat training and fears being left behind by his stronger rivals while he recovers. Uta figures that he does not truly want to quit, as his true passion is sumo; however, Kurikyuta declares that the dohyō is no longer his stage and flees, and Jogi attacks, engulfing him in darkness and transforming him into a Darkranda. After the Cures purify the Darkranda with Kirakkiran For You, Kurikyuta regains his motivation and vows to recover from his injury and continue sumo while practicing harder, as he can do his best because people like the Cures and Chikara support him and cheer him on.
34	"Detective Hamorin! Solve the Mystery Menu!"; Transliteration: "Meitantei Hamorin! Nazo no Menyū o Ou Zona!" (Japanese: 名探偵はもりん！謎のメニューを追うぞな！)	Kazuya Kitō	Directed by : Masahiro Yokotni; Storyboarded by : Yutaka Tsuchida	Hikaru Koga & Yuki Kitajima	Yuki Nakabayashi	September 28, 2025
While helping out at Cafe Glitter along with Uta, Hamori discovers a menu from when the cafe first opened, with one of the items being crossed out. It starts with "o" and ends with "g', though Kazu and Oto refuse to tell them what it is, claiming to have forgotten. While the Cures wonder what the item could be, Hamori, along with Kyutarou, assumes the role of a detective like in Detective Zundoku, an anime she has been watching, in order to solve the mystery. She leaves to search for clues in town, believing the item to be oden hamburg, while the Cures follow her in order to secretly support her, as Purirun and Meroron conduct their own investigation. Out in town, they encounter Ema, who tells Hamori to talk to the cafe's oldest regular customer, Renji, while Tanaka joins Purirun and Meroron in their investigation to look into the logs of staff patrol under Hanamachi Town Branch Office. However, though Renji does not know what the item could be, he reveals to Hamori his past of working as a detective known as the Lightbulb, and that, while he was in Paris, he ate the dish Haute-Vassan Jelly de Grandierge. Tanaka meets up with the Cures and they head to the house of Hiroshi Owarai, who, according to the patrol log, was a frequent customer of the cafe before he quit his job ten years ago and left for the city to pursue his dream of being a comedian, saying that he would return once he made it big as a comedian. Back in town, the Cures and Tanaka meet up with Hamori and Renji, who were searching for ingredients to make the dish, and encounter Owarai, who has returned to town. He reveals that the item had inspired him to move to the city by giving him the courage to pursue his dream and returns to Cafe Glitter to thank Kazu and Oto, only to learn that it is currently closed for the afternoon, and Chokkirine attacks, engulfing him in darkness and transforming him into a Darkranda. After the Cures purify the Darkranda with Kirakkiran For You, they return to Cafe Glitter, where it is revealed that the item was a "One-Liner Gag", which Kazu and Oto had intended to make customers smile, but shelved after being embarrassed when nobody laughed. Despite this, Owarai tells them that watching them perform without shame gave him the courage to pursue his dream, and Uta performs a song based on the one-liners for the customers as Hamori declares the case to be closed.
35	"A Surprise Amusement Park Date!?"; Transliteration: "Yuenchi Dēto wa Totsuzen ni!?" (Japanese: 遊園地デートはとつぜんに！？)	Hideki Hiroshima	Directed by : Akiko Inoue; Storyboarded by : Kenta Yokoya	Mikio Fujiwara	Zhuxing Xu	October 5, 2025
At Cafe Glitter, after Kaito saves Renji from falling, Renji gives him two tickets to the amusement park HanamichiLand as thanks. After seeing Uta with the park's guidebook, Kaito invites her to go to HanamichiLand with him, which the Cures believe to be a date, though Uta is conflicted about how she feels about Kaito. While the Cures, consisting of the duos of Nana and Meroron and Kokoro and Purirun, decide to go on their own dates at the library and the beach, Uta and Kaito arrive in HanamichiLand. Uta is initially nervous, but as they spend time playing games and eating ice cream, she begins to ease up. However, after Kaito retrieves a child's hat that was blown away by the wind and loses his hat in the process, Uta, fearing what could happen if Kaito is recognized in public, leads him away from the crowd to the rides. They end up on the Ferris wheel, where Uta is initially unsure what to say, but starts a conversation through the Cure Idol merchandise the Cures had given her, telling him how he makes others "kirakilala" even when not on stage, and Kaito praises Idol for making others smile while expressing his desire to do the same. However, as they are getting off the Ferris wheel, Jogi attacks, engulfing a boy who got dizzy after going on rides in darkness and transforming him into a Darkranda, and Uta is forced to leave Kaito behind in order to fight the Darkranda. After the Cures purify the Darkranda with Kirakkiran For You, Uta reunites with Kaito, who had been searching for her, and tells him that she had noticed how he seemed to be lonely and that she believes he is already making others smile. Kaito thanks her for her kindness and tells her that he was thinking about his best friend, who he wants to make smile. Uta sings to cheer him up, and as they leave, she tells him that she wants to see him again, which he agrees to, and realizes how she feels about him: that she wants him to be happy. Back at Cafe Glitter, the Cures tell each other about their dates.
36	"It's Settled! You And I Concert!"; Transliteration: "Kettei! Kimi to no Raibu!" (Japanese: けってい！キミとのライブ！)	Keitaro Nakajima	Hiroko Kanasugi	Rino Murayama & Beom Seok Hong	Shota Suzuki	October 12, 2025
While helping the Idol Precure Research Club, Purirun suggests holding a concert after hearing that its members wish to see the Idol Pretty Cure live in concert, with the Cures agreeing to her suggestion so that their fans can see them in person. While Tanaka searches for a venue, they decide to come up with a title for a concert, striving to decide on a title as good as Kaito's newest concert: Kaito Hibiki's Concert Tour: Melody Leaping Through the Sky! After Tanaka announces that the concert venue is Pacifico Yokohama, which can hold up to 5,000 people, the Cures decide to ask the Idol Precure Research Club what they want to see from the concert, while Tanaka, along with Cutty and Zakkuri, promotes it. After taking the Club's suggestions, the Cures move on to deciding the set list and practicing rehearsals. However, as Idol is unable to picture a venue that can hold so many people, the Cures decide to visit Pacifico Yokohama in person in order to come up with a title. After seeing a special feature where Kaito is interviewed about what a concert means to him, believing that a concert is a special space where fans can gather and share that space with him, where he can convey his feelings and feel the audience's feelings, Purirun and Meroron vow to support Uta. The next day, the Cures arrive at Pacifico Yokohama for rehearsals, and, after meeting staff member Yasu, Idol realizes the hard work that others put in to make concerts happen. After Yasu spills tea while getting lunch for the staff, Jogi attacks, engulfing Yasu, who is feeling down after messing up again, in darkness and transforming him into a Darkranda. After the Cures purify the Darkranda with Kirakkiran For You, rehearsals resume and Tanaka introduces the Cures to Ami Ishii, Chihaya Yoshitake, and Akane Kumada, singers who are fans of the Cures and are also holding a concert at Pacifico Yokohama. Idol invites them to join their concert, having decided on a title: You & I: We're Idol Precure.
37	"A New Power! Idol Heart Ribbon"; Transliteration: "Aratana Chikara! Aidoru Hāto Ribon!" (Japanese: 新たなチカラ！アイドルハートリボン！)	Takao Iwai	Directed by : Yuka Yamada; Storyboarded by : Ayako Hiraike	Ken Ueno	Kana Arai	October 19, 2025
The Cures receive a message from Tanaka asking them for help at the Pretty Store. However, Uta sees Kaito passing by and, with Nana and Kokoro's encouragement, decides to chase after him while they help out at the store; in town, Jogi passes by Kaito, who seems to recognize him and mentions a person named Kazuma. Uta arrives late to the Pretty Store as it is closing and, when Nana and Kokoro notice that she is troubled, she tells them that she was unable to talk to Kaito because he looked sad. After hearing from the Cures that Kaito may not be able to talk about his troubles due to being a legendary idol and not having anyone there for him, Uta leaves to talk to him again. She finds Kaito at the beach singing, and he reveals to her that the beach is where he would go to sing alone and where he and his best friend, Kazuma, first met, after he complimented his singing. However, after Kazuma invited him to an idol audition and only Kaito passed, they have not seen each other since they graduated junior high and Kaito left town to debut as an idol; since then, he has been singing in hopes that it reaches Kazuma, regretting not chasing after him when he had the chance. They are interrupted when Jogi attacks, engulfing Kaito in darkness and transforming him into a Darkranda. During the fight, Jogi reveals himself to have been Kazuma, but denies affiliation with Team Chokkiri and refuses to reveal why he joined them, declaring that the bond between him and Kaito has long since been severed. Idol's bond with Kaito and resolve to save him grants her the Idol Heart Ribbon, allowing her to transform into her Idol Heart Ribbon Style and use a more powerful version of Idol Smiling, Idol Smiling Echo, to purify the Darkranda. Afterwards, Idol reunites with Kaito, reassuring him that his bond with Kazuma is not broken and telling him that she wants to see him smile, and he realizes that Uta is Cure Idol after remembering Uta's words.
38	"Taking a Step Together! WIN-WIN Halloween!"; Transliteration: "Issho ni Fumidasu! Win-Win Harōin!" (Japanese: 一緒に踏み出す！ウィンウィンハロウィン！)	Tomoki Watanabe	Directed by : Yuniko Ayana; Storyboarded by : Yutaka Nakashima	Yuka Takemori & Noel Ano-Nuevo	Natsuko Tosugi	October 26, 2025
After school, the Cures gather at Cafe Glitter and cheer on Kaito's tour; however, after seeing the ghost decorations on the banana muffins that Tanaka brought for them, Uta flees from the cafe. When the Cures follow after her, she reveals that she is afraid of ghosts and Halloween, which has prevented her from enjoying the holiday despite her desire to participate in it. At Kokoro's suggestion and with their support, they decide to enter Hanamichi Town's costume contest, despite Nana's hesitation and Uta's past experience trying to enter the contest when she was younger, only to be scared by ghosts. Before choosing a costume, they attempt to help Uta overcome her fear, but their efforts only leave her more frightened; as Nana and Kokoro head home, she offers to make costumes and asks Nana if Uta will be okay on Halloween, which she is unsure about. The next day, at school, Nana shares with them her lunch made from pumpkins, but Uta is frightened after learning that Nana made the food from her jack-o'-lantern, and Nana feels bad that her efforts to help are not truly helping. However, Uta forgives Nana, as she gives her courage despite her fear, and they decide on what they want their costume to be. On the day of Halloween, Kokoro dresses as a witch and Purirun and Meroron dress as an angel and a devil, respectively, to keep their actual costumes a secret until the contest. In town, Chokkirine learns that Cutty and Zakkuri are alive and living in Hanamichi Town and encounters trick-or-treaters, including a boy dressed as "Jack-o' Lundam". After the boy loses his mask and falls into despair that he cannot enter the contest, Chokkirine attacks, engulfing him in darkness and transforming him into a Darkranda. Idol is initially unable to fight the Darkranda due to her fear, but, with Wink's support, purifies the Darkranda with Idol Smiling Echo. Afterwards, the contest commences, with Uta and Nana dressed as "Banabanabananas". Though they lose to Kokoro along with Purirun and Meroron, who dressed as Zukyoon and Kiss and pretended to be stuffed animals, Uta gains the courage to enjoy Halloween for the first time along with Nana, who declares it to be a "WIN-WIN Halloween".
39	"Spin, Sunda!"; Transliteration: "Maware! Sunda-Senpai!" (Japanese: まわれ！寸田(すんだ)先輩！)	Takayuki Murakami	Chiaki Inaba	Toshie Kawamura, Yukiko Ueda & Keisuke Katayama	Yuki Nakabayashi	November 9, 2025
After school, Kokoro is heading home when she notices Sunda practicing dancing; after performing an intense spin, he crashes and loses consciousness, declaring that dance will save the world. When he awakens, despite Kokoro telling him that he could get hurt, he insists that he has to keep practicing in order to win the Dancing Star Cup, a dancing competition, before he graduates from junior high. After learning that the Cup's founder is Mawaru Sunda, the Cures ask Sunda about him, and he reveals that Mawaru is his grandfather and that the Sunda family has connected to the world through dance for generations. When Mawaru was younger, he traveled the world, connecting to people and animals through dance due to being unable to speak foreign languages. He founded the Cup to save the world with dance, believing that dance will save the world, which Sunda wants to win due to his admiration for Mawaru. The Cures decide to help Sunda with his training; however, on the day before the competition, he feels that he is missing something. Through a dance battle with Kokoro, he is able to discover what lies beyond the spin and the reason why he spins: to have others see his smile and make them smile as well. On the day of the competition, the Cures encounter another group of dancers from Kiraboshi High School and prepare to cheer Sunda on. However, Sunda loses his cap and falls into despair that he cannot perform spins without it, and Chokkirine attacks, engulfing him in darkness and transforming him into a Darkranda. During the fight, the Cures struggle to fight the Darkranda before another group of Cures, Dancing Star Precure, arrives to aid them, and their attack gives an opening for the Idol Pretty Cures to purify the Darkranda with Kirakkiran For You. Afterwards, Sunda returns to the competition; though he loses to Hibataro Sanbade and places second, he is glad to have had fun and conveyed his feelings despite not winning. Encouraged by Kokoro's words about his passion for dancing, as she could tell how much he loves to dance and how much fun it was, he leaves while the Cures agree to have Kokoro teach them how to dance.
40	"Please Listen! Seven-Colored Melody"; Transliteration: "Kiite Kudasai! Nanairo no Senritsu" (Japanese: 聴いてください！なな色の旋律)	Hideki Hiroshima	Directed by : Akiko Inoue; Storyboarded by : Noriyo Sasaki	Nobuhito Akada, Makoto Ozawa & Hiroshi Numata	Zhuxing Xu	November 16, 2025
At school, Kokoro shows the Cures her complete set of Idol Pretty Cure mascots and explains how she admires them; however, when Meroron asks Nana who her idol is, she does not have an answer. Nana returns home, where Hajime has received plane and concert tickets for them to go to France and see Mutsumi's piano concert. Following the concert, they go out to eat and spend time together as a family for the first time in a while; afterwards, Mutsumi explains that she has a piano lesson with her teacher the following day, as despite being a professional, she still strives to improve in order to deliver the best show possible. After seeing Nana play piano for them, however, Mutsumi makes a decision. While brushing Nana's hair like she did when Nana was younger, Mutsumi explains how, when she first came to Paris, she was lonely and wanted to go home. However, Nana's words about how her playing made her feel and her resolve to support her in going to France to make others feel the same way gave Mutsumi the strength to keep going. The Cures receive a call from Nana, who reveals that Mutsumi, believing that Nana's piano playing produces a color unique to her and that living overseas would allow that color to shine brighter, proposed she and Hajime move to France in order to be with her, which would also allow Nana to study piano under her teacher. While this saddens them, as they would no longer be together, Meroron encourages Nana to make her own decision independent of being a Cure. Nana is torn between wanting to live with Mutsumi and play piano and wanting to stay with her friends, and unsure what her "color" is. However, after seeing a rainbow, she gains the resolve to go after Mutsumi as she is leaving for her lesson, telling her that she wants to play piano with her. While Tanaka explains that Nana would graduate from Idol Pretty Cure if she were to stay in France, Uta believes that she will always be a member, even if she is far away. In town, Jogi attacks, engulfing a painter whose painting fell into the water in darkness and transforming him into a Darkranda. During the fight, the Cures struggle to fight the Darkranda without Nana until she returns, reaffirming her desire to do things with both her family and friends and play a melody that is her own. After Wink purifies the Darkranda with Wink Crescendo, she decides to stay with her friends, having decided that Mutsumi is her idol. In France, Mutsumi sees footage of Wink's performance and, realizing that Nana and Wink's melodies are similar, asks that Nana play for her again.
41	"I'll Protect Hearts Going Kyun-Kyun!"; Transliteration: "Kokoro KyunKyun Mamorimasu!" (Japanese: 心キュンキュン守ります！)	Takao Iwai	Directed by : Chiaki Inaba & Yōichi Katō; Storyboarded by : Kazuki Yokochi	Mai Ishii, Ami Konishi, Shin'ya Nogami, Fansaurus, Yu Ting Xiao & Lin Gui Du	Shota Suzuki	November 23, 2025
At school, the Cures learn from Uta and Nana that Chiyo Kai, a student and representative of Class 2-C running for student council president, has pledged to abolish the Idol Precure Research Club if elected. When Kokoro asks Chiyo why she wants to abolish the club, Chiyo explains that it is because the club has not produced any results, and Kokoro asks her to come and see the club's efforts for herself before she makes her decision. Though Chiyo agrees, with Kokoro showing her their activities and the effort and passion that goes into them, she does not understand what results their efforts are supposed to achieve. After learning that Chiyo, as the only candidate, would easily be elected, Kokoro makes a decision; the next day, Uta and Nana encounter Kokoro giving a speech, and the Cures decide to support her after she reveals to them that she is running for president in order to protect the club. However, after seeing the fifty promises that Chiyo has made for her campaign, Kokoro, unsure of what she wants to do as president, decides to stay late at school. There, she encounters Chiyo and, after hearing from her about how she strives to make the school better for everyone, reconsiders what she can do for others. After Chiyo gives her an umbrella, Kokoro is heading home from school when she receives a call from Uta; at Tanaka's house, she learns of the fan letters she has received and the value of support. Meanwhile, Jogi reveals Zakkuri's fate to Chokkirine, warning her that darkness will consume her if she fails to satisfy Darkine. On the day of the final election speeches, Chokkirine attacks, engulfing Chiyo, who is envious of Kokoro and the support she is receiving, in darkness and transforming her into a Darkranda. With the Cures' support, Kyun-Kyun purifies the Darkranda with Kyun-Kyun Beat; afterwards, the speeches resume, and Kokoro concedes the election to Chiyo, having decided to withdraw and support Chiyo after realizing she is more fit to be president. Though the Cures worry about the club being abolished, Chiyo later visits the club room, having decided to support the club after realizing the results of support. Kokoro is overjoyed after hearing the first song on the lunch broadcast, which Chiyo had chosen: Kyun-Kyun's song Kokoro Revolution.
42	"Connect! Echo From You"; Transliteration: "Konekuto! Kimi Kara no Echo" (Japanese: コネクト！キミからのEcho)	Chiaki Kon	Directed by : Yuka Yamada; Storyboarded by : Kenta Yokoya	Akira Inagami, Kenji Miuma & Mikio Fujiwara	Takashi Kurahashi	November 30, 2025
With Kaito's first concert tour since resuming activities coming to a close, the final concert will take place at Hanamichi Stadium the following day. Though Uta is happy to see Kaito again, she worries about his desire to reach Kazuma through his song and what would happen if he were to learn that Jogi is Kazuma. Later that day, as Uta prepares to take Kyutarou for a walk, Kaito visits Cafe Glitter and joins her on her walk. At the beach, he gives Uta souvenirs from his time abroad and tickets to the concert, revealing that the reason he chose Hanamichi Town as the final location for the tour is because he believes Kazuma to be there. He still considers him and Kazuma to be best friends, even after he had offered Kazuma the chance for them to debut as idols together and Kazuma had refused, not wanting to hold him back but vowing to listen to his songs. However, Kaito is conflicted about what to do and worries that his song will not reach Kazuma. On the day of the concert, Jogi is contacted by Darkine, who senses his doubt, and attacks, engulfing a man who lost his concert ticket in darkness and transforming him into a Darkranda. During the fight, the Darkranda captures Kaito, who had followed the Cures into the Heart Garden, and Jogi reveals that Darkine recruited him after he failed the idol auditions, as his lack of progress caused him to feel that he was in a world without light. Despite the Cures' and Kaito's attempts to reach him, Jogi refuses Kaito's offer to take his hand again and orders the Darkranda to attack Kiss, causing the Heart Garden to collapse and allowing the Darkranda to absorb the audience's darkness to become stronger. While Idol fights the Darkranda, Kaito sings in order to reach Jogi, and his feelings allow him to transform into Cure Connect and purify Jogi with Legend Echo, returning him to his original self as Kazuma. After Kaito and Kazuma reconcile, the Cures purify the Darkranda with Kirakkiran For You. Afterwards, the concert resumes; following the concert, Kazuma, with Kaito's encouragement, decides to be an idol alongside him despite having initially given up on that dream.
43	"Uta's Song"; Transliteration: "Uta no Uta" (Japanese: うたの歌)	Yūya Nomoto	Directed by : Akiko Inoue; Storyboarded by : Noriyo Sasaki & Yūya Nomoto	Seiji Masuda	Natsuko Tosugi	December 7, 2025
Following the battle, the footage of the Cures fighting the Darkranda at the concert becomes major news online. At Cafe Glitter, while Uta sings to cheer up the Cures, who are worried about their identities being exposed, she is approached by the president of a talent agency, who noticed her singing and offers that she debut as an idol under the agency. With support from her family and friends, Uta accepts the offer, resolving that she will be happy if she can make others "kirakilala" like Kaito does and discover what she loves doing. However, when she attempts to sing to the president, he tells her that she must rest her voice and avoid singing until her debut. Being unable to sing takes a toll on Uta, as she is unable to reassure her classmates when they are afraid of another Darkranda attacking, and begins to question what she wants to do. At the beach, she encounters Kaito and praises him for bringing happiness to others; in response, he tells her that, since they first met, her singing has given him the resolve to continue as an idol after he felt uncertain upon returning to Hanamichi Town. While Uta questions why she wants to sing, the Cures meet up with her and reassure her that they will support her no matter what path she chooses. Meanwhile, Chokkirine is contacted by Darkine, who gives her an ultimatum: defeat the Cures, or else she will be trapped in Darkine's darkness for eternity. In town, Chokkirine attacks, engulfing the president, who is guilty about trying to prevent Uta from suffering the same fate he did, in darkness and transforming him into a Darkranda. During the fight, Chokkirine reveals the existence of Kurakuland, from where Darkine can see all, and the Darkranda binds the Cures' voices, preventing them from singing to defeat it. However, Idol's resolve to sing because she wants to enables her to break free, and she purifies the Darkranda with Idol Smiling Echo. Afterwards, Chokkirine is consumed by darkness for her failure and Uta reunites with the president, telling him that she wants to sing, but no longer wants to be an idol. He accepts her decision, telling her that, when he was younger, he was a successful singer until he damaged his throat from practicing too much, causing him to be unable to sing the songs he loved. He decides that singing when you want to sing is the happiest thing of all; seeing Uta sing, Kokoro remembers that the president was once a famous rock singer known as Shoutin' Shuichi. Kaito also sees Uta singing, and calls her an idol for making others smile.
44	"The Secret of Kirakiland!"; Transliteration: "KirakiRando no Himitsu!" (Japanese: キラキランドのひみつ！)	Yuuna Hirosue	Yuniko Ayana	Mika Hironaka & Rino Murayama	Yuki Nakabayashi	December 14, 2025
Pikarine contacts the Cures and informs them that, now that they have gathered all the Kirarun Ribbons in the Kirarun Ribbon Book, the Big Kirakira Ribbon and KirakiLand can be restored. She welcomes them to come to KirakiLand, which they accept, heading to KirakiLand aboard the MOMO along with Tanakhan, Cuttin, and Zakkurin. Zukyoon hesitates after being reminded of her previous attempt to restore the Ribbon, but, with the Cures' support, opens the Book, restoring the Ribbon along with KirakiLand and freeing its inhabitants. The fairies are overjoyed to meet the Cures and learn that Purirun and Meroron became Cures, and Cuttin and Zakkurin apologize to them for their actions as members of Team Chokkiri. However, Kiss, unwilling to associate with the other fairies due to being of darkness, leaves for the forest. There, she encounters a fairy who is afraid of the darkness returning and, remembering when Purirun was there for her when KirakiLand was plunged into darkness, comforts them. Amidst preparations for a party at the castle, the Cures ask Pikarine about Kurakuland, which she describes as a counterpart to KirakiLand. Meroron senses Darkine's presence as Kurakuland descends from the sky and Darkine attempts to cut the Ribbon again, revealing that Kurakuland was born from humans' darkness. Though Pikarine summons the shield TSUBOMI to protect KirakiLand, the Ribbon's light dims and she reveals that TSUBOMI will not last forever. As darkness on Earth grows due to fear of the Darkranda, so does Darkine's power, and both Earth and KirakiLand are in danger of being plunged into darkness if TSUBOMI is destroyed or the Ribbon loses its Kirakira. Meroron believes that she was able to sense Darkine's presence due to being a "child of darkness". However, Pikarine reveals that Meroron was born to be a savior of KirakiLand and stop the spread of darkness along with Purirun, who shared her power to become a Cure. Meroron realizes why she was born in KirakiLand and she and Purirun, who thanks her for granting their wishes to become Cures, renew their resolve. In town, Darkine attacks, engulfing Uta's classmate Ruka, who is anxious and afraid of the Darkranda, in darkness and transforming her into a Darkranda. After the Cures purify the Darkranda with Kirakkiran For You, Kiss reassures Ruka, telling her that the Idol Precure will be there for her if she feels anxious again, and resolves to protect her future along with the Cures. After Pikarine contacts them, revealing that KirakiLand was founded through humans' Kirakira and that the Ribbon is connected to Earth through the Heart Tree, allowing it to receive Kirakira, the Cures resolve to gather Kirakira in order to restore the Ribbon.
45	"A Kirakilala Christmas"; Transliteration: "Kirakkiranran! Kurisumasu" (Japanese: キラッキランラン！クリスマス)	Takao Iwai	Masahiro Yokotani	Mitsuru Aoyama	Zhuxing Xu	December 21, 2025
Christmas is approaching, yet Hanamichi Town has lost its vibrancy due to fear of the Darkranda, with a lack of decorations and the annual lights being cancelled. Realizing that they cannot collect Kirakira for the Heart Tree if people are not happy, Uta decides they will make the town "kirakilala" themselves. However, while Cafe Glitter has been decorated, Tanaka struggles to enjoy the holiday due to a previous experience on the Christmas the first year he was stationed in town. He had attempted to give a gift to a woman he was driving for, only to learn that she had another man with her. The Cures brainstorm ideas for Christmas, including decorating the trees, serving chicken and cake, and hiring someone to make it snow. However, as they hang their wishes in stockings on the trees, they learn from Tanaka that, despite Cuttin and Zakkurin aiding him, they do not have enough supplies to finish on time. Despite this, after Uta's parents tell them that Christmas does not have to be celebrated a certain way and they can still have fun and make the day feel special, they resume decorating with help from Cafe Glitter's customers. The Cures decide to hold a concert on Christmas Eve at the Heart Tree, while Kijima confronts Tanaka over the Cures' fight against the Darkranda at Kaito's concert and them disappearing, though he explains it using Santa, presents, and the reindeer as an example. As the Cures prepare to take the stage at the concert, in town, Darkine attacks, engulfing a man who was dressed as Santa and sad that people were not buying the cakes he was selling in darkness and transforming him into a Darkranda. While Cuttin and Zakkurin perform in their place, the Cures struggle to fight the Darkranda due to being unwilling to hurt Santa. However, after Kiss traps it in a net, they are able to purify the Darkranda with Kirakkiran For You. Afterwards, the Cures take the stage and perform amidst a shower of cherry blossoms from the Heart Tree. Following the concert, amidst the festivities, Kaito visits Cafe Glitter and gives Uta his scarf; in return, she performs a Christmas song for him. That night, as Uta is sleeping, Santa passes over Hanamichi Town.
46	"Happy New Year Idol Precure!"; Transliteration: "Kotoshi mo Yoroshiku Aidoru Purikyua!" (Japanese: 今年もよろしくアイドルプリキュア！)	Kazuya Kitō	Hiroko Kanasugi	Hikaru Koga, Yuuki Kitajima & Sayuri Ehara	Shota Suzuki	January 4, 2026
After Uta watches the first sunrise of the new year with Purirun and Meroron at the Heart Tree, she and the Cures gather at Tanaka's house for a New Year's party. They are contacted by Pikarine, who informs them that KirakiLand is withstanding Darkine's attacks with the Kirakira sent to the Big Kirakira Ribbon, but the fight is not yet over. At Tanaka's suggestion, they transform into Cures, but are interrupted by a group of reporters and Hanami-chan as part of a prank show. Following the party, during which they participate in activities such as pounding mochi and playing cards, Tanaka reveals that he arranged the prank so they could have fun. As they are heading home, Nana and Kokoro learn that Uta's scarf was a gift from Kaito, and they decide to have a sleepover at Cafe Glitter so that Uta can tell them the details. While staying up that night, they reaffirm their dreams, with Purirun and Meroron promising to come back and visit them even after they return to KirakiLand. The next morning, they are contacted by Tanaka, who reveals that the Heart Tree has turned pitch-black. After the Heart Tree absorbs the darkness formed from the townspeople's anxiety, Darkine attacks, transforming it into a Darkranda. Though the Cures purify the Darkranda with Kirakkiran For You, the Heart Tree does not return to normal; as its petals fall, Hanamichi Town is shrouded in darkness and the light of the Big Kirakira Ribbon fades as Darkine prepares to attack.
47	"Trio Dreams Returns?"; Transliteration: "Torio Dorīmuzu Ritānzu!?" (Japanese: Trio Dreamsリターンズ!?)	Keitarou Nakajima	Yuka Yamada	Mikio Fujiwara	Natsuko Tosugi	January 11, 2026
The Cures attempt to contact Pikarine, but lose contact with her as Darkine revives Chokkirine and both Hanamichi Town and KirakiLand are soon to be consumed by darkness. They gather at Tanaka's house, where he explains that they are unable to send Kirakira to KirakiLand due to the Heart Tree's current state. However, they do not know Darkine's motives; Cuttin and Zakkurin believed that Chokkirine could know something, but they found Team Chokkiri's hideout deserted when they went there to apologize to her for quitting. As Kazuma also does not know of Darkine's motives, Uta decides to ask her directly; however, Kazuma warns them that Darkine has grown more powerful after gathering darkness from people's anxiety and fear. Returning to Cafe Glitter, Uta, seeing how the cafe brings joy and smiles to people, decides to hold the Cures' final live concert and invite Darkine as a special guest, which they agree to despite their initial shock. After announcing the concert through a livestream, with Kaito's encouragement, the Cures take the stage at Hanamichi Stadium to rehearse. However, Chokkirine attacks with an army of Darkranda. Despite their attempts to reason with her, the Cures are overwhelmed by Chokkirine's power until Cuttin and Zakkurin intervene and are able to get through to her, asking her to work with them again as a trio. At Zukyoon's suggestion, Idol, Wink, and Kyun-Kyun perform Trio Dreams, purifying Chokkirine with High Emotion. As Team Chokkiri's members reunite, Darkine appears above Hanamichi Town and destroys the Heart Tree.
48	"Final Concert! Inviting Darkine!"; Transliteration: "Fainaru Raibu! Dākuīne wo Goshōtai!" (Japanese: ファイナルライブ！ダークイーねをご招待！)	Hideki Hiroshima	Directed by : Akiko Inoue; Storyboarded by : Hanako Ueda	Keisuke Katayama, Rino Murayama, Yukiko Ueda & Marina Kobayashi	Zhuxing Xu	January 18, 2026
Chokkirine reveals that she was created by Darkine after Darkine was born in Kurakuland from humanity's darkness and first started to plunge the world into darkness. Darkine appears before them and destroys Chokkirine as punishment for her having seen the light; before fading away, Chokkirine thanks the Cures for having taught her Kirakira, believing that they can bring a smile to Darkine. As Darkine attacks Hanamichi Town, summoning an army of Darkranda and trapping people in crystals, Tanaka stays behind to prepare the stage for the Cures' concert while they leave to confront Darkine and the Darkranda, rescuing people along the way. However, Idol, Wink, and Kyun-Kyun are separated from Zukyoon and Kiss, who believe that they should go to Darkine, though they vow to put on a concert together and be connected by their Kirakira no matter how far apart they are. As Kijima realizes that the Idol Pretty Cure are fighting, she broadcasts their fight to the townspeople, who support the Cures despite not knowing why they are fighting. With their support, the Cures purify the Darkranda as Idol heads to the Heart Tree to confront Darkine alone, having vowed to invite her to their concert. Idol attempts to purify Darkine with Idol Smiling Echo; however, her song does not reach Darkine, who begins to spread her darkness throughout Hanamichi Town.
49	"Together With You! Kirakilala"; Transliteration: "Kimi to Issho ni! Kirakkiranran" (Japanese: キミと一緒に！キラッキランラン)	Chiaki Kon	Yōichi Katō	Miho Sugimoto & Yukiko Ueda	Yuki Nakabayashi	January 25, 2026
Uta attempts to resist the darkness, but succumbs to despair after seeing the Cures trapped in crystals. Along with Hanamichi Town's residents, she is consumed by darkness and trapped in a crystal, with Darkine intending to engulf the entire world in darkness. Darkine explains that, being born from humanity's darkness, she has fed upon it to gain power. However, as people have struggled in their pursuit of their dreams and light, their darkness will never fade. As a result, she seeks to create a world of silence: one without fighting or sorrow. Uta awakens alone in a world of darkness, but, after seeing her KirakiLight, remembers the Cures' words and the promise they made. Her singing frees her, the Cures, and Hanamichi Town's residents and temporarily restores the Heart Tree. With their support and acknowledging that light and darkness can coexist, the Cures purify Darkine with Kirakkiran For You, restoring Hanamichi Town and KirakiLand. Afterwards, Darkine is reborn as a fairy, having seen the Cures' Kirakira and reached the same realization as them. A week after the battle, Cuttin and Zakkurin have returned to KirakiLand, which has begun to coexist with Kurakuland, and Chokkirine has also been reborn as a fairy. As the Cures are heading to a party at Uta's house, a mysterious Pretty Cure helps Hamori solve the mystery of what they are planning and retrieves their balloons after Uta loses them. During the party, Purirun and Meroron reveal that they plan to return to KirakiLand, having learned from Pikarine that the Heart Tree will soon go to sleep and disappear, meaning that KirakiLand will no longer receive Kirakira from Hanamichi Town. After Uta sees Kaito off as he and Kazuma leave overseas for New York, with them promising to see each other again, the Cures hold their final concert at Hanamichi Stadium. Following the concert, Purirun and Meroron return to KirakiLand along with Tanaka as the Heart Tree fades away. Time passes, and a new Heart Tree has begun to grow, allowing Purirun and Meroron to return to Earth. Along with Nana and Kokoro, who have become a songwriter and influencer, respectively, they cheer on Uta at her performance at Hanamichi Stadium.
