= Back Street Girls =

Japanese manga series by Jasmine Gyuh

- Cover of volume 1

バックストリートガールズ (Bakku Sutorīto Gāruzu)
- Genre: Comedy
- Manga
- Written by: Jasmine Gyuh
- Published by: Kodansha
- English publisher: NA: Kodansha USA
- Magazine: Weekly Young Magazine
- Original run: March 16, 2015 – September 15, 2018
- Volumes: 12
- Anime television series

Back Street Girls: Gokudolls
- Directed by: Chiaki Kon
- Written by: Susumu Yamakawa
- Studio: J.C.Staff
- Licensed by: Netflix
- Original network: BS11, Tokyo MX, MBS
- Original run: July 4, 2018 – September 5, 2018
- Episodes: 10
- Film
- Back Street Girls: Gokudols

Back Street Girls (Japanese: バックストリートガールズ, Hepburn: Bakku Sutorīto Gāruzu) is a Japanese manga series by Jasmine Gyuh. It is about three yakuza men forced by their boss to become a transfeminine idol group. It was serialized in Kodansha's seinen manga magazine Weekly Young Magazine from March 2015 to September 2018 and was compiled into 12 volumes. The manga is licensed digitally in English by Kodansha USA. A 10-episode anime television series adaptation, produced by J.C.Staff and directed by Chiaki Kon, aired from July to September 2018 on BS11 and other channels. A live-action adaptation, Back Street Girls: Gokudols, was released in February 2019.

== Plot ==
After an unspecified major failure, Yakuza underlings Kentaro, Ryo and Kazuhiko are forced by their boss, Inugane, to either commit seppuku and sell their organs or go to Thailand to undergo gender reassignment surgery, and train to become idols. They choose the latter and debut as Airi, Mari and Chika, the Gokudols. They suffer abuse from Inugane as he trains them to become idols. Still, their hearts are Yakuza, and their brotherhood is strong.

== Characters ==
Airi Yamamoto (山本 アイリ, Yamamoto Airi) / Kentaro Yamamoto (山本 健太郎, Yamamoto Kentaro)
Voiced by: Yuka Nukui (Airi), Daisuke Ono (Kentaro) (Japanese); Erika Harlacher (Airi), Kaiji Tang (Kentaro) (English)
Played by: Natsumi Okamoto (Airi), Jin Shirasu (Kentaro)
Formerly Kentaro Yamamoto, the "Aniki" (Big Brother) of the Yakuza trio. Kentaro was abandoned by his parents and held odd jobs until he joined the Yakuza. He always drinks after a fight. As Airi, she is the leader of the Gokudols and she always gets luxury items as gifts.
Mari Tachibana (立花 マリ, Tachibana Mari) / Ryo Tachibana (立花 リョウ, Tachibana Ryō)
Voiced by: Kaori Maeda (Mari), Satoshi Hino (Ryo) (Japanese); Cherami Leigh (Mari), DC Douglas (Ryo) (English)
Played by: Ruka Matsuda (Mari), Masato Hanazawa (Ryo)
Formerly Ryo Tachibana, Kentaro's right-hand man. He is a fan of actor Hitoshi Takamura, collecting his films and even trying to give herself to him as Mari (which didn't work out). As Mari, she is considered the cool member of the trio. She always gets fan letters, which attracts the jealousy of the others, Chika especially. She hates sweets, to the point of breaking up with his previous girlfriend over it. Mari's ex-Yakuza father is transgender. She also suffers butt problems, notably hemorrhoids.
Chika Sugihara (杉原 チカ, Sugihara Chika) / Kazuhiko Sugihara (杉原 和彦, Sugihara Kazuhiko)
Voiced by: Hikaru Akao (Chika), Kazuyuki Okitsu (Kazuhiko) (Japanese); Christine Marie Cabanos (Chika), Zach Aguilar (Kazuhiko) (English)
Played by: Akane Sakanoue (Chika), Reiya Masaki (Kazuhiko)
Formerly Kazuhiko Sugihara, the youngest of Kentaro's Yakuza trio. As Chika, she is the ditsy one. She had a girlfriend as Kazuhiko, whom she caught with another man at one of their concerts. She always gets cute items, much to Mari's irritation, and occasionally slips "cute" idol words, again much to the others' irritation. It took a long time for his/her father to acknowledge him/her after transitioning.
Lina (リナ) / George (ジョージ)
Voiced by: Minami Takahashi (Lina), Shinji Kawada (George) (Japanese); Laura Stahl (Lina) (English)
A Mafia member sent from the US to research the Gokudols, having also undergone gender reassignment surgery for similar reasons. However, the research plan was scrapped, and Lina was left to Inugane's hands, much to her shock.
Kimanjiro Inugane (犬金 鬼万次郎, Inugane Kimanjiro)
Voiced by: Keiji Fujiwara (Japanese); Richard Epcar (English)
Played by: Koichi Iwaki
The idol-obsessed leader of the Inugane Yakuza Group. He forced his screw up underlings to undergo gender reassignment surgery to become idols. His wife is former enka singer Natsuko Tanaka, who ironically hates idols. He bullies his underlings with threats and actual physical violence.
Mandarin Kinoshita (マンダリン 木下, Mandarin Kinoshita)
Voiced by: Junichi Suwabe (Japanese); Ray Chase (English)
A producer and self-proclaimed "girlology" master. He shapes the girls into idols, though he's not usually successful due to being left in the dark about their secret.
Kōji Nagata (永田 晃司, Nagata Kōji)
Voiced by: Yasuhiro Mamiya (Japanese); Jon Bailey (English)
The yakuza trio's captain. He was imprisoned by their blunder.
Kimura (木村, Kimura)
Voiced by: Natsuki Hanae
Played by: Tetsuya Sugaya
The Gokudols' gopher or servant boy. Initially Kazu's underling, their friendship turned sour when he was revealed to be Chika's fan, to the point of her face being on his briefs.
Natsuko Tanaka (田中 なつ子, Tanaka Natsuko)
Voiced by: Kimiko Saitō (Japanese); Rachel Robinson (English)
Secretly the wife of Boss Inugane. A famous enka singer who hates idols after they eclipsed her in popularity.
Yui Nakamura (中村 結衣, Nakamura Yui)
Voiced by: Ayumi Mano (Japanese); Faye Mata (English)
Played by: Arisa Komiya
The new trainee member of the Gokudols. She's a very cheerful and upbeat girl who held the Gokudols in high regard, much to Inugane's pleasure and the trio's bewilderment.

== Media ==
=== Manga ===
Back Street Girls is written and illustrated by Jasmine Gyuh. It was serialized in Kodansha's Weekly Young Magazine from March 16, 2015, to September 15, 2018. Kodansha published 12 tankōbon volumes between August 6, 2015, and January 3, 2019. The manga is licensed in English by Kodansha USA.

No.	Original release date	Original ISBN	English release date	English ISBN
1	August 6, 2015	978-4-06-382649-4	August 14, 2018	9781642124354
2	December 4, 2015	978-4-06-382711-8	August 14, 2018	9781642124576
3	March 4, 2016	978-4-06-382742-2	August 14, 2018	9781642124583
4	July 6, 2016	978-4-06-382808-5	September 18, 2018	9781642124781
5	October 6, 2016	978-4-06-382859-7	November 20, 2018	9781642125399
6	February 6, 2017	978-4-06-382903-7	December 18, 2018	9781642125726
7	May 2, 2017	978-4-06-382963-1	January 15, 2019	9781642126327
8	September 6, 2017	978-4-06-510151-3	February 19, 2019	9781642126747
9	December 6, 2017	978-4-06-510541-2	March 19, 2019	9781642126983
10	March 6, 2018	978-4-06-511078-2	April 16, 2019	9781642128147
11	June 6, 2018	978-4-06-511761-3	May 28, 2019	9781642128796
12	January 4, 2019	978-4-06-514159-5	July 30, 2019	9781642129502

=== Anime ===
An anime television series adaptation, produced by J.C.Staff and directed by Chiaki Kon, aired between July 4 and September 5, 2018, on BS11 and other channels. The scripts were handled by Susumu Yamakawa, and sound direction was handled by Jin Aketagawa. The anime has been licensed by Netflix.

=== Live-action ===
A live-action film, titled Back Street Girls: Gokudols and directed by Keinosuke Hara, premiered on February 8, 2019, in Japan. The staff and cast of the film also returned for a six-episode live-action television series that premiered on February 17, 2019.
