= Naruto: Shippuden season 22 =

Naruto: Shippuden
- Season 22
- DVD cover for the Shippuden story arc titled Nostalgic Days
- No. of episodes: 21

Release
- Original network: TV Tokyo
- Original release: October 20, 2016 – March 23, 2017

Season chronology
- ← Previous; Season 21

The twenty-second and final season of the Naruto: Shippuden anime television series is based on Part II of Masashi Kishimoto's Naruto manga series. The first four episodes are anime–exclusive material that examine the childhoods of some main characters under the title Nostalgic Days, while the rest of the season was set over two years after the Fourth Great Ninja War and covers stories based on light novels set after the manga's ending, respectively titled Sasuke Shinden: Book of Sunrise (サスケ真伝 来光篇, Sasuke Shinden Raikō-hen), Shikamaru Hiden: A Cloud Drifting in Silent Darkness (シカマル秘伝 闇の黙に浮ぶ雲, Shikamaru Hiden — Yami no Shijima ni Ukabu Kumo), and Konoha Hiden: The Perfect Day for a Wedding (木ノ葉秘伝 祝言日和, Konoha Hiden: Shūgenbiyori). The episodes are directed by Osamu Kobayashi, Chiaki Kon, Toshinori Watabe, and Masahiko Murata, and produced by Pierrot and TV Tokyo. The season aired from October 2016 to March 2017.

The season would make its English television debut on Adult Swim's Toonami programming block and premiere on March 10 and finished on September 1, 2024.

The season contains three musical themes, including one opening and two endings. The opening theme song, "Karanokokoro" (カラノココロ; lit. 'Empty Heart') performed by Anly, is used from episodes 480–500. The first ending theme song, "Tabidachi no Uta" (旅立ちの唄; lit. 'Departure Song') performed by Ayumikurikamaki, is used from episodes 480–488. The second ending theme song, "Zetsu Zetsu" (絶絶; lit. 'Absolutely') performed by Swimy, is used from episodes 489–500.

== Episodes ==
No. overall	No. in season	Title	Directed by	Written by	Animation directed by	Original release date	English air date
Nostalgic Days
480	1	"Naruto and Hinata" (Note: Originally in Latin script English and stylized in all caps with an interpunct in place of the word "and".)	Osamu Kobayashi	Osamu Kobayashi	Ichirou Uno	October 20, 2016	March 10, 2024
A young Naruto Uzumaki is isolated by the villagers who blame him for the Fourth Hokage's death, and he spends his time sitting in the Hokage Monument. After catching fish for dinner, he meets the Third Hokage, who tells him that compared to one person, the world is small, which gives Naruto a different view of the world. A young Neji is told by his father that his duty will be to protect Hinata. When they first spar, she tells him about her displeasure in fighting and Neji tries to convince her otherwise. After the Hyuga Affair, Hinata runs away after seeing Neji cry and meets Naruto, who takes her home and advises her not to cry.
481	2	"Sasuke and Sakura"	Directed by : Mitsuto Yamaji; Storyboarded by : Osamu Kobayashi	Osamu Kobayashi	Akira Takeuchi & Gen Sato	October 27, 2016	March 24, 2024
A young Sasuke Uchiha asks Itachi to spend time with him, but Itachi declines and leaves for a mission. Their parents tell Sasuke they will be leaving the next day, but Sasuke decides to stay home with Itachi, who spends their time alone training with Sasuke. After dinner, they sleep outside and Itachi tries to teach the meaning of their clan symbol to Sasuke, who simply says he will surpass him. By morning, Itachi has already left. A young Sakura Haruno spends her time in a makeshift hideout to hide her forehead and avoid bullying. She meets Ino, who helps her fix her bangs and offers her encouragement. Sakura later tells her parents she made a friend. She tells Ino about her crush on Sasuke, much to Ino's jealousy. When Sakura tries to confess, Sasuke asks who she is, and she flees in frustration.
482	3	"Gaara and Shikamaru"	Directed by : Osamu Sekita; Storyboarded by : Osamu Kobayashi	Osamu Kobayashi	Mayumi Oda & Hideki Natori	November 3, 2016	March 31, 2024
A young Gaara is hated by his father and isolated by his siblings, who play in the sandbox with Gaara until their father separates them. During dinner, Gaara asks his uncle about his mother and how to feel happy. His uncle replies that the moon makes him feel better when he is sad, and Gaara agrees that the moon makes him feel happy. A young Shikamaru is bored in class lectures and wants to sleep but is punished along with Naruto and Choji by Iruka for interrupting class. They bond as they stand in the hallway and later hang out after school. Shikamaru criticises Naruto for defending Hinata from bullies and the boys later laugh at Ino for getting rejected by Sasuke.
483	4	"Jiraiya and Kakashi"	Directed by : Taisuke Mamoru; Storyboarded by : Osamu Kobayashi	Osamu Kobayashi	Yūko Matsui & Yoko Suzuki	November 10, 2016	April 7, 2024
A young Jiraiya wonders the meaning of dreams as he struggles to surpass Tsunade and Orochimaru during Hiruzen's training. Years later, during the Second Great Ninja War, Jiraiya asks his friends what their dreams are. He is pleased with Tsunade's dream of peace but is dismayed at Orochimaru's reply that dreams are meaningless. Jiraiya decides to pursue a dream of achieving peace. A young Kakashi Hatake meets with Obito and Rin after a training session with Hiruzen and declines eating dinner with them afterwards. He goes home to prepare himself dinner until his friends show up and offer him company, which Kakashi accepts.
Sasuke Shinden: Book of Sunrise
484	5	"Part 1: The Exploding Human"; Transliteration: "Kibaku Ningen" (Japanese: 起爆人間)	Chiaki Kon	Masanao Akahoshi	Ichirou Uno, Minoru Murao, Ayako Satō & Hiroshi Tomioka	December 1, 2016	April 14, 2024
A Konoha villager, Tadachi, is attacked by two people, one of them uses red eyes to put him under genjustu. Kakashi, Sakura and Naruto discuss about Konoha villagers disappearing when the village is attacked by the missing villagers, including Tadachi. Since they are "exploding humans" upon being injured, Naruto and Shikamaru restrain them and Hinata knocks them unconscious. Kakashi has Sai notify Sasuke of the events and for him to return to the village because his visual prowess is needed. Meanwhile, Sasuke feeds a group of stray cats and encounters exploding humans attacking a bamboo village. When he asks what is happening, he is mistaken as an enemy by Iou, Chino, and Nowaki. Chino tries to use her Water Release but Sasuke's Grand Fireball Jutsu repels the water. Iou orders her to keep attacking but Chino declines because of how strong Sasuke is. Sasuke uses his Sharingan to free the victims, surprising Chino that Sasuke is a Uchiha. Chino tells Sasuke that she and Nowaki are wandering shinobi who perform entertainments. Iou's daughter turns into an exploding human and kills herself. Later, Sasuke realizes via Sharingan Genjutsu that someone with a kekkai genkai is responsible for the exploding humans.
485	6	"Part 2: Coliseum"; Transliteration: "Koroshiamu" (Japanese: 闘技場(コロシアム))	Directed by : Ayumi Ono; Storyboarded by : Ryōji Fujiwara	Masanao Akahoshi	Hiroyuki Okuno, Shinichirou Minami, Minoru Morita & Miho Sekimoto	December 8, 2016	April 21, 2024
Sasuke informs Kakashi of the exploding humans, telling him he wants to investigate the matter independently. After the funerals for the victims, Sasuke heads to Orochimaru's hideout to get more information on Fushin. Chino and Nowaki want to go with him and he relents after remembering Itachi. Chino asks him about Konoha and if he will revive the Uchiha clan but Sasuke keeps quiet. After meeting with Yamato to verify his intents are for the sake of Konoha, Sasuke speaks to Orochimaru, who says he will need to find Oyashiro first because he is a kekkei genkai collector. Karin, Suigetsu, and Jugo come in and Karin quarrels with Chino and then Suigetsu. When Sasuke leaves with Orochimaru, Karin speculates that Sasuke refuses to stay in Konoha because his Sharingan and Rinnegan earn him enemies. Traveling via boat, Sasuke wonders how Orochimaru can travel so freely despite his crimes. Orochimaru retorts that Sasuke and Kabuto are no different themselves but are unlikely to ever be evil again. Arriving at the Coliseum, Orochimaru explains it is where wealthy citizens use their shinobi in battles to win contests. Chino says that Sasuke should help the shinobi. To Sasuke's dismay, Orochimaru signed Sasuke up as a contestant against Futsu because Oyashiro wants to capture Sasuke. Just as the battle begins, another exploding human appears.
486	7	"Part 3: Fūshin" (Japanese: 風心(フウシン))	Shingo Okano	Masanao Akahoshi	Koji Yabuno, Hiroaki Imaki & Yoko Suzuki	December 15, 2016	April 28, 2024
Several exploding humans appear but Sasuke, Yamato, and Orochimaru save bystanders from being killed from the explosions. Sasuke is attacked by someone hiding in the coliseum's tunnels but before he can give chase he's forced to save Chino from a exploding human. Oyashiro asks to talk with Sasuke and explains that Fushin was a shinobi he won at the Coliseum but he left with the other shinobi Oyashiro collected. When asked if Fushin had red eyes, Oyashiro says someone from Fushin's group did and Sasuke suspects Fushin has a partner and attacked the village to get to Sasuke. Oyashiro explains the owner of the kekkai genkai is from the Chinoike clan, which was persecuted by the Uchiha clan at command of the Land of Lightning. Sasuke heads to Hell Valley with Chino and Nowaki, and saves more people from exploding. Sasuke is attacked but sees it is not Fushin but a Lightning Group member named Karyu. He tries to attack Sasuke but is knocked down and tries once more to fight Sasuke, who easily defeats him. Karyu, afraid, agrees to surrender and Sasuke scans his memories to confirm his suspicions. Sasuke discovers that Karyu was hired to pose as the person responsible for the Exploding Humans, who is Nowaki. Sasuke asks him to reveal his true appearance, which Nowaki does and reveals himself to be Fushin.
487	8	"Part 4: The Ketsuryūgan"; Transliteration: "Ketsuryūgan" (Japanese: 血龍眼)	Osamu Sekita	Masanao Akahoshi	Hideki Natori & Mayumi Oda	December 22, 2016	May 5, 2024
Sasuke and Fushin fight, with Fushin's Typhoon Release overpowering Sasuke's Susanoo. Sasuke wins by jumping in the hole of the funnel and hitting Fushin. However, Sasuke's attempt to get information fails and Fushin escapes. Traveling to Hell Valley, Sasuke finds Chino waiting for him and she reveals herself as the sole survivor of her clan. In a backstory, Chino was kidnapped by Oyashiro when she was too young to remember her parents and discovered her Ketsurygan through training. At the Coliseum, she fought and won against Fushin, whom she befriended due to their loneliness of being ostracized. After finding out about her clan, Chino escaped with Fushin and a few others, becoming the Lightning Group to help the Bamboo village. However they came into conflict with the Hidden Mist village, which caused the Bamboo villagers to betray them. Two of their comrades died and Karyu left, and Chino and Fushin arrived at Hell Valley to find her clan was destroyed. Two Hidden Mist shinobi attacked them but were turned into Exploding Humans by Chino, who vowed revenge.
488	9	"Part 5: The Last One"; Transliteration: "Saigo no Hitori" (Japanese: 最後の一人)	Chiaki Kon	Masanao Akahoshi	Nagakawa Momoko, Minoru Murao, Ayako Satō & Koji Yabuno	January 5, 2017	May 26, 2024
Chino and Sasuke battle but Sasuke proves to be superior against Chino's blood dragons. She cuts his arm and reveals she will turn him into an Exploding Human, but Sasuke uses his Sharingan to prevent this and Chino is left defeated. She cries out how jealous she is of him for having people who loved him despite his past and asks why he protects Konoha despite its role in the Uchiha clan's downfall, and Sasuke replies he has a friend who shares his pain. Fushin arrives to protect Chino but she tells him to stop and surrenders. As they are sent to jail, Sakura and Hinata heal the last Exploding Human victim. The Mizukage offers Chino, Fushin, and Karyu to work for her to atone for Kirigakure's betrayal. Sasuke returns to the Coliseum to free all the shinobi and the Raikage arrives with his entourage to arrest the shinobi owners for illegal gambling. The Raikage tells Sasuke he is glad he didn't kill Sasuke when Naruto pleaded for Sasuke to be spared. Orochimaru and Oyashiro have a conversation, with Oyashiro revealing to have the Ketsuryugan, being Chino's father, and he killed his clan. Sakura talks about Sasuke making significant atonements. Sasuke receives a letter from Naruto, who says Sasuke protecting the village is like the Konoha Police Force (in the novel, Sakura is the one who makes the comparison of Sasuke to the Police Force). Remembering when he told Itachi it was his childhood dream of joining, Sasuke decides to return to Konoha.
Shikamaru Hiden: A Cloud Drifting in Silent Darkness
489	10	"Part 1: The State of Affairs"; Transliteration: "Fūun" (Japanese: 風雲)	Toshinori Watanabe	Masaya Honda	Tomoyuki Kitamura & Myoung-Hun Park	January 12, 2017	June 2, 2024
Shikamaru works at a desk job but is bored and is only doing it until Naruto becomes Hokage. At a Shinobi Union meeting, Shikamaru and other village ambassadors discuss the decline in shinobi assistances, and Temari suspects Shikamaru is hiding something. When he reports to Kakashi, Shikamaru reveals suspicions the Land of Silence is responsible for the increase of missing ninja and Konoha is investigating it, Gavin already sent Sai to spy. However Sai's reports sound suspicious and Kakashi wants to send Shikamaru in to assassinate or capture the leader, Gengo, with the help of two Anbu, Ro and Soku. Shikamaru has dinner with Ino and Choji, and visits the graves of his father and Asuma, and is greeted by Mirai and her mother. By morning, Shikamaru gets ready to leave and meets with Naruto for a moment before arriving at the village gates.
490	11	"Part 2: Dark Clouds"; Transliteration: "An'un" (Japanese: 暗雲)	Directed by : Taiji Kawanishi; Storyboarded by : Toshinori Watanabe	Masaya Honda	Min-Seop Shin, Hyung-Sik Shin & Eun-Ham Kim	January 19, 2017	June 9, 2024
Shikamaru, Soku, and Ro arrive at the Land of Silence. They try to disguise themselves to get to the checkpoint but find it is heavily guarded and Soku's desire to persevere causes their first plan to collapse. They head to Sai's last location, which is an inn and Shikamaru tries to get information by playing shogi with a villager. Soku is dismayed that shinobi are viewed as disposable pawns for citizens. She lets out her frustration as she talks to a busboy Komori and considers defecting Konoha, which strains her from Shikamaru and Ro. She goes to the checkpoint to prove her worthiness and sees that Komori is a member of Gengo's unit, as he wanted to see Soku's ability himself. Shikamaru and Ro try to stop her but she seemingly kills them. Once past the checkpoint, Soku knocks out Komori and meets with Shikamaru and Ro, who had been out under a fake death trance, to guide them inside Gengo's fort, Tobari.
491	12	"Part 3: Recklessness"; Transliteration: "Yamikumo" (Japanese: 闇雲)	Directed by : Naoki Hishikawa; Storyboarded by : Yo Hong & Yuuki Ukai	Masaya Honda	Il-Sung Kim, Yoko Suzuki & Hiroaki Imaki	January 26, 2017	June 16, 2024
Shikamaru wakes up from nightmares and shows Rō the little intel they have on Gengo. Hinoko reunites with Rō and Shikamaru and informs them that how no one knows anything about Gengo or Fushū Castle. They go around Tobari and find a Konoha missing ninja, Minoichi, who they cornered to learn more of Gengo. Later that night, Gengo appears for a public speech and reveals a restrained Sai, which the crowd asks for his death. As Gengo's words begin to affect them, Shikamaru and Rō create a diversion to try to save Sai, but he retaliates, having been entranced by Gengo. Gengo's words affect Rō and Hinoko, and tries converting Shikamaru but he strangles himself with his own shadow.
492	13	"Part 4: Cloud of Suspicion"; Transliteration: "Giun" (Japanese: 疑雲)	Directed by : Masayuki Matsumoto; Storyboarded by : Katsuyuki Kodera	Masaya Honda	Ho-Duk Lee & Sun-Yeong Seo	February 2, 2017	June 23, 2024
Shikamaru struggles against Sai's ink beasts and wakes up shackled in a cell. He thinks of shogi to pass the time while Sai brings him food and compliments his resistance. The two discuss Sai's current condition and why Shikamaru came instead of someone from Team 7. Rō is then tossed into a cell by Shikamaru's while Hinoko is being brainwashed by Gengo. Shikamaru is taken to talk with Gengo and told Shikamaru how he perceives the current shinobi world's peace is forced by the great nations. Gengo shows him a flower that dies if taken out of its environment and compares it to shinobi who will stop developing in times of peace. Shikamaru notices that the flowers' scent stirs up unpleasant memories, which Gengo uses to turn shinobi to his side. Shikamaru escapes and returns to Gengo's room where fights Rō and Hinoko, who have been converted into Gengo's guards. Shikamaru has Hinoko's chakra needles hit his ears to impair his hearing so Gengo's voice can't affect him. He almost reaches Gengo, but is stopped by Sai's ink lion and is hit with a chakra needle on his head while Gengo escapes. Ino and Chōji arrive to save him, though Shikamaru believes he is dreaming, but is convinced that he isn't when Temari slaps him for lying to her. As Ino and Chōji prepare to fight Rō and Hinoko, Temari tosses Asuma's chakra blades to Shikamaru, which he uses to open up the way to Gengo.
493	14	"Part 5: Dawn"; Transliteration: "Shinonome" (Japanese: 東雲)	Toshinori Watanabe	Masaya Honda	Myong-Hun Park, Jin-Won Seo, Joung-Kyoung Lee & Yoon-Joung Kim	February 9, 2017	June 30, 2024
While Shikamaru pursues Gengo through the Fushū Castle, his hold over Sai, Rō, and Hinoko weakens as their fight with Ino, Chōji, and Temari drags on. Gengo lures Shikamaru in a dark room so he can't use his shadows and for his hearing to become vulnerable to Gengo's jutsu. Gengo tells Shikamaru about his past with Zabuza, and how it shaped his ideology. Ino enters Sai's mind to completely break Gengo's hold on him and warns them about Gengi's trap to convert Shikamaru. Gengo tells Shikamaru his plan to infiltrate the hidden villages and can make them cause incidents all over. Gengo's jutsu manifests the darkness in Shikamaru, but after thinking about Naruto, he wasn't affected by it. As Temari and the others reach their location, Shikamaru calls on Rō and Hinoko to finish their mission. Together, they managed to render Gengo's jutsu useless and take him into custody. After the mission, Shikamaru and Sai asks Temari and Ino on dates.
Konoha Hiden: The Perfect Day for a Wedding
494	15	"Part 1: Naruto's Wedding"; Transliteration: "Naruto no Kekkon" (Japanese: ナルトの結婚)	Michisoku Matsuda	Kento Shimoyama	Megumi Tomita & Retsu Okawara	February 16, 2017	July 7, 2024
Everyone is giving their congratulations to Naruto and Hinata for their upcoming wedding. Konohamaru is recording their messages as his wedding gift. Iruka has trouble putting his message to words and has his hands full disciplining three rowdy students who are jealous of Iruka constantly comparing his students to Naruto. Because there will be some shinobi in missions on the day of the wedding, Kakashi gives everyone a mission to find a wedding gift and the value of such will determine who attends. Iruka is offered to become the new vice-principal of the Academy but he is unsure until he feels pressured to take the required exam. Iruka' student, Tsukane, tries to get recognition by stealing the Hokage Seals but is caught by Iruka, who realizes his errors in comparing him to Naruto. Iruka decides to take the exam.
495	16	"Part 2: A Full-Powered Wedding Gift"; Transliteration: "Furu-Pawā Kekkon Iwai" (Japanese: フルパワー結婚祝い)	Masahiko Murata	Kento Shimoyama	Masahiko Murata	February 16, 2017	July 14, 2024
Lee and Tenten search for a wedding gift and ask Guy for advice. Lee considers barbells or workout materials but thinks those are no good. Later that night, he imagines seeing Neji encouraging him to use his strength to find the answer. Lee thinks barbells are perfect as a gift but Tenten is bewildered. She doesn't know what to give Naruto and Hinata because a kunai is too unusual for a wedding. Ultimately, she decides to give them a kunai set as a gift.
496	17	"Part 3: Steam and Food Pills"; Transliteration: "Yukemuri to Hyōrōgan" (Japanese: 湯けむりと兵糧丸)	Yoshihiro Sugai	Kento Shimoyama	Tsunetoshi Takahashi, Tetsurō Taira, Eiichi Tokura & Hirofumi Onodera	February 23, 2017	July 21, 2024
Shikamaru tries to find a gift for the wedding but doesn't want it to be something as simple as money and he decides a romantic honeymoon. However he needs a woman's perspective and asks Temari, who mistakes his words as if he is taking her on a honeymoon. Sakura and Ino both want to give a photo frame as a gift and decide to have a cooking contest with Choji as the judge to decide whose cooking is better. Choji says both sweets are good, and the girls decide to make sweets as a gift. Temari realizes the misunderstanding and angrily smacks Shikamaru.
497	18	"Part 4: The Kazekage's Wedding Gift"; Transliteration: "Kazekage no Oiwai" (Japanese: 風影の御祝)	Maki Odaira	Kento Shimoyama	Chiyuki Tanaka	March 2, 2017	August 11, 2024
Gaara and his siblings, along with A and his entourage, arrive in Konoha for the wedding. Gaara wants to give a gift but thinks it must be extravagant. Lee and Tenten take the Sand siblings to Ichiraku Ramen to give them an idea of what Naruto likes. Iruka meets Gaara for the first time and thanks him for being Naruto's friend. Killer B decides to host a dancing show for the wedding with the Kage as performers, much to A and Mei's dismay. Gaara realizes his gift to Naruto should be from him as a friend rather than as a Kazekage.
498	19	"Part 5: The Last Mission"; Transliteration: "Saigo no Ninmu" (Japanese: 最後の任務)	Directed by : Naoki Horiuchi; Storyboarded by : Yukihiro Matsushita	Kento Shimoyama	Naoki Takahashi & Yūko Fuji	March 9, 2017	August 18, 2024
Shino debates what to get Naruto and Hinata when he talks with Iruka's students and offers them encouragement to pursue their dreams. Shino and Kiba visit Kurenai and Mirai, and decide to get honey wine as a gift. When Kiba remarks this will be Team 8's last mission, Shino doubts his future. They go to Soroku and meet Tamaki, with whom Kiba becomes infatuated, and she tells them to find a beekeeper in the Bamboo forest. Shino and Kiba get lost in the fog but Shino finds the beekeeper, who fights Shino to no avail. He gives Shino the honey wine but says Shino will remain trapped in the fog as long as he has doubts due to the beekeeper' jutsu. Shino solves this by deciding to support his teammates no matter what as their lives change. The boys return to Konoha and Iruka tells Shino he should become a teacher because of how easily he won over the rebellious kids.
499	20	"Part 6: The Outcome of the Secret Mission"; Transliteration: "Gokuhi Ninmu no Yukue" (Japanese: 極秘任務の行方)	Kazunori Mizuno	Kento Shimoyama	Kumiko Horikoshi	March 16, 2017	August 25, 2024
Kakashi starts to worry over the mission because everyone had bought extravagant gifts for the wedding and thinks he is being unfair because the five Kage will be attending, thus the need for several shinobi to be on guard. He goes for a walk to clear his head and runs into Hinata, who reports Naruto has been helpful with the wedding preparations. Hinata had lunch with Sakura, Ino, and Tenten, who all nearly reveal the mission. Hinata then meets with Kiba and Shino, who also nearly reveal the mission. Konohamaru is about to turn in his video message when he overheard Kakashi talking with Tsunade about the mission. He tells the others and Hinata overhears this, and is distressed. Hinata asks Kakashi to let her clansmen serve as security but Kakashi refuses and vows to resolve it. Later on, she runs across Iruka, who hears about how she is so worried everyone doing so much for the wedding of 'The Hero Of The Ninja World'. However, Iruka puts her mind at ease by telling her that everyone is trying so hard because of their desire to celebrate with Naruto, not because he's a hero, but because he's their friend that they respect and care about so much. Meanwhile, everyone talks to Kakashi about compromising to be in guard and switch shifts together so everyone can attend. Tsunade reveals she made up the rule of the mission due to a lot of weddings during the war. Kakashi agrees with everyone and goes to Gaara to ask for extra shinobi guards, which he agrees. Kakashi then asks Konohamaru to record a message from the Kazekage but Gaara is shy and uses his sand to blow Kakashi and Kankuro away.
500	21	"Part 7: The Message"; Transliteration: "Iwai no Kotoba" (Japanese: 祝いの言葉)	Masahiko Murata	Kento Shimoyama	Koji Yabuno, Retsu Okawara & Anna Yamaguchi	March 23, 2017	September 1, 2024
The wedding is a week away. Iruka thinks about Naruto from his childhood and how he still hasn't given his message for the wedding. After class, he talks with Hinata, who says everything is ready. While cooking dinner, Iruka is visited by Naruto, who asks Iruka to attend as his father. Iruka happily agrees and realizes that Naruto also doesn't see their relationship as teacher and student but as family. Iruka gives his message, warning Hinata of Naruto's immature tendencies and stating that Naruto better make her happy. On the day of the wedding, everyone attending gives packets of money as the Five Kage arrive. Shikamaru and Temari, as well as Ino and Sai, attend as couples. Sakura receives a congratulations letter from Sasuke's hawk and the two think about each other while he continues traveling. Meanwhile, Kakashi and Iruka watch all the guests excitedly waiting for Naruto, having realized how far he's come, and how much he's accomplished to have made so many friends who want to congratulate him. Naruto looks at Minato's headstone as Hinata thinks about Neji. Hiashi and Hanabi come in to tell them it is time. Naruto and Hinata then begin walking to the ceremony to get married.

== Home media release ==
=== Japanese ===
Nostalgic Days
Volume	Date	Discs	Episodes	Reference
1	July 5, 2017	1	480–483	

Sasuke Shinden: Book of Sunrise
Volume	Date	Discs	Episodes	Reference
1	August 2, 2017	1	484–488	

Shikamaru Hiden: A Cloud Drifting in Silent Darkness
Volume	Date	Discs	Episodes	Reference
1	September 6, 2017	1	489–493	

Konoha Hiden: The Perfect Day for a Wedding
Volume	Date	Discs	Episodes	Reference
1	October 4, 2017	1	494–496	
2	November 1, 2017	1	497–500	

=== English ===
Viz Media (North America – Region 1/A)
Box set	Date	Discs	Episodes	Reference
37	March 26, 2019	2	473–486	
38	June 11, 2019	2	487–500	

Manga Entertainment (United Kingdom – Region 2/B)
Volume	Date	Discs	Episodes	Reference
37	July 15, 2019	2	473–486	
38	October 7, 2019	2	487–500	

Madman Entertainment (Australia and New Zealand – Region 4/B)
Collection	Date	Discs	Episodes	Reference
37	June 5, 2019	2	473–486	
38	August 7, 2019	2	487–500	
