= Back Street Girls: Gokudols =

- Directed by: Keinosuke Hara
- Written by: Jasmine Gyuh; Shoichiro Masumoto; Hidehiro Ito
- Based on: Back Street Girls by Jasmine Gyuh
- Produced by: Hidehiro Ito; Muneyuki Kii
- Starring: Natsumi Okamoto; Ruka Matsuda; Akane Sakanoue; Koichi Iwaki
- Music by: Kōji Endō
- Production company: Toei Company
- Distributed by: Toei
- Release date: 8 February 2019 (Japan)
- Running time: 87 minutes
- Country: Japan
- Language: Japanese
- Box office: ¥430 million ($5.39 million)

Back Street Girls: Gokudols (Japanese: ゴクドルズ, Hepburn: Back Street Girls: Gokudoruzu) is a 2019 Japanese yakuza comedy-drama film, directed by Keinosuke Hara and based on the Jasmine Gyuh manga of the same name. The film stars Nana Asakawa, Ruka Matsuda, Akane Sakanoue and Koichi Iwaki. Distributed by Toei, it made its premiere on February 8, 2019, in Japan.

After the film's release, the cast and crew reunited for a live-action television series set before, during, and after the film, featuring Arisa Komiya and Hideo Nakano in new character roles.

== Plot ==
After learning from their imprisoned Old Boss that he has decided to remain in prison and eventually die, yakuza blood brothers Kentaro Yamamoto, Ryo Tachibana and Kazuhiko Sugihara swear to do their new boss, "Mad Dog" Kimanjiro Inugane, proud. Electing to do so by taking out their Rival Boss, the trio fight their way into their compound, only to learn after being captured that Inugane had already reached a truce with him. After being returned to Inugane, the trio beg forgiveness. Offered the choice to commit seppuku and sell their organs, or go to Thailand to undergo gender reassignment surgery and train to become idols, the trio choose the latter. After surgery and intensive training Kentaro, Ryo and Kazuhiko return as trans women Airi, Mari and Chika, and become the Gokudols ("Yakuza Idols").

While the trio struggle with their new purpose, their popularity as the Gokudols rises. Airi discovers their ex-girlfriend of six years (whom they had left to live a life without crime) to now have a five-year-old daughter who is a fan of Airi (who believes she is their own child), and Airi struggles with whether or not to face the two of them. Mari develops a relationship with the lesbian nurse treating hemorrhoids resulting from the surgery, while Chika enters into a relationship with Inugane's and the Gokudols' assistant, Kimura, who is aware of Chika's past. After meeting once again with their old boss and explaining their new circumstances, the trio are encouraged to embrace their new selves and become the best they can be, after which time they embrace their public image, visiting cake shops and reluctantly publicly protesting the yakuza.

Learning of the upcoming J-Pop Summit, the Gokudols audition for the corrupt Seiji Koizumi, who drugs the group with the intent of sexually assaulting them after promising Chika the starring role in his new movie while they were awake. The trio proceed to instead become incredibly drunk and assault Koizumi after learning of his intentions and seeing him strike his girlfriend for interrupting. Koizumi cancels the Summit, donating its funding to charities owned by him as damage control to counter reports of the assault, to which he refers as "fake news", before running a smear campaign against the Gokudols that results in the majority of their upcoming gigs being canceled. However, after seeing them beat up Koizumi, his former girlfriend, who is also an idol, agrees to fund the Summit herself and invites the Gokudols to perform.

As public opinion turns against him, an outraged Koizumi hires private investigators to follow the Gokudols. He then has Airi's purported family, Mari's girlfriend and Chika's boyfriend kidnapped in order to blackmail the Gokudols into not attending the Summit. Upon being informed of the kidnappings, they proceed to the location Koizumi asked them to meet him, where they attack the rival yakuza hired by Koizumi as his henchmen, violently incapacitating all of them using a combination of their yakuza and idol tactics.

After rescuing Kimura, Chika is shot in the chest by Koizumi and apparently dies. Determined and furious, Airi grasps a katana dropped by one of Koizumi's men and uses it to take out his remaining bodyguards, stopping it mere inches from Koizumi's face before returning to check on the dying Chika. Koizumi, enraged at his treatment at the hands of mere "idols", picks up the katana intending to cut off Airi's head, only to be struck by a fireworks rocket launcher and incapacitated by Inugane, who had followed the Gokudols and rescued Koizumi's hostages. After cheerfully informing the group that he is proud of them as both idols and yakuza, Inugane tells them to proceed to the Summit, shooting at their feet to startle them and give them adrenaline rushes, inadvertently reviving Chika, who had merely been knocked unconscious when the metallic kevlar bra Chika was wearing resisted Koizumi's bullets. Celebrating, the Gokudols run several miles to the Summit, changing en route, and energetically perform as its grand finale.

In a mid-credits scene, Airi discovers that the ex-girlfriend had married another man immediately after Airi left, the daughter is not Airi's child, and faints upon learning the news. In a post-credits scene, after Koizumi begs Inugane not to kill him while held at gunpoint, promising to do "anything", he sends him to Thailand for reassignment surgery and training to become an idol.

== Cast ==
- Natsumi Okamoto as Airi Yamamoto
  - Jin Shirasu as Kentaro Yamamoto
- Ruka Matsuda as Mari Tachibana
  - Masato Hanazawa as Ryo Tachibana
- Akane Sakanoue as Chika Sugihara
  - Reiya Masaki as Kazuhiko Sugihara
- Koichi Iwaki as Boss / Teacher / Director "Mad Dog" Kimanjiro Inugane
- Tetsuya Sugaya as the Assistant Kimura
- Dori Sakurada as Seiji Koizumi
- Ren Osugi as the Old Boss
- Hitoshi Ozawa as the Rival Boss

=== Series ===
- Arisa Komiya as Yui Nakamura
- Hideo Nakano as

== Release ==
The film made its world premiere in Japan on February 8, 2019.

== Reception ==
Back Street Girls: Gokudols earned over $1,547,000 in its opening weekend at the Japanese box office, where it grossed ¥430 million ($5.39 million) during its theatrical run.

== Television series ==
The crew and cast of the film, joined by Arisa Komiya and Hideo Nakano as new characters, returned in a six-episode, live-action series that premiered on MBS, and on TBS's "Dramaism" programming block, on February 17, 2019.

Ryujin Kiyoshi performs the series' opening theme song "Koishite Koishite Yashinatte", with a different artist performing the ending theme song of each episode.
