= Tokimeki Restaurant: Miracle 6 =

2018 film by Chiaki Kon

- Theatrical release poster
- Japanese: 劇場版 ときめきレストラン☆☆☆ MIRACLE６
- Literal meaning: Heartbeat Restaurant the Movie: Miracle 6
- Revised Hepburn: Gekijōban Tokimeki Resutoran ☆☆☆ Mirakuru 6
- Directed by: Chiaki Kon (Note: Credited as Animēshondirekutā (アニメーションディレクター; lit. "Animation Director"))
- Screenplay by: Chiaki Kon
- Based on: Tokimeki Restaurant by Konami
- Produced by: Fumi Morihiro
- Starring: see below
- Cinematography: Maiko Imazeki
- Edited by: Junichi Uematsu
- Production company: Production I.G
- Distributed by: Asmik Ace
- Release date: February 10, 2018
- Running time: 56 minutes
- Country: Japan
- Language: Japanese

Tokimeki Restaurant: Miracle 6 (Note: Japanese: 劇場版 ときめきレストラン☆☆☆ MIRACLE６, Hepburn: Gekijōban Tokimeki Resutoran ☆☆☆ Mirakuru 6; lit. "Heartbeat Restaurant the Movie: Miracle 6") is a 2018 Japanese animated musical film written and directed by Chiaki Kon based on the Tokimeki Restaurant mobile game developed by Konami. Produced by Production I.G and distributed by Asmik Ace, Miracle 6 marked the celebration of the 5th anniversary of the game. The film stars the voices of Daisuke Kishio, Daisuke Namikawa, Tetsuya Kakihara, Kohsuke Toriumi, Satoshi Hino and Takuya Eguchi. Miracle 6 was released in Japan on February 10, 2018.

== Premise ==
"Popular idol groups '3 Majesty' and 'X.I.P.' were wondering how to give a special gratitude to the fans who support them as they celebrate their 5th anniversary of their debut.

One day, the president of his agency, Prince Republic, called the leaders of both groups, Kirishima and Date, and handed them a notice of the decision to hold the 5th anniversary event of their debut and a new song for that purpose. However, the song is the same for both groups ... Actually, the new song that was handed over was the legendary song "White and Black" that the president himself tried when he was still active as an idol, but could not sing.

While "White and Black" is a masterpiece, the previous groups that challenged this song was disbanded one after another before the song was performed, ended up being 'cursed'. The 3 Majesty and X.I.P., who argue that they are suitable for performing the legendary song, will hold a special VS live with the right to perform the legendary song at the end of the 5th anniversary live!

3 Majesty and X.I.P., when the power of 6 people becomes one, a miracle happens ... !!"

== Voice cast ==
3 Majesty

- Daisuke Kishio as Shinnouske Otowa
- Daisuke Namikawa as Tsukasa Kirishima
- Tetsuya Kakihara as Kaitō Tsuji

X.I.P.

- Kohsuke Toriumi as Kyōya Date
- Satoshi Hino as Kento Fuwa
- Takuya Eguchi as Tōru Kanzaki

== Production ==
In August 2017, it was announced that an anime film based on Konami's Tokimeki Restaurant mobile game was in development, with Chiaki Kon directing the film at studio Production I.G and Tooru Ookubo is designing the characters for the animation with original character design by Makoto Senzaki. The voice actors from the mobile game reprised their respective roles for the film.

== Release ==
The film was released in Japanese theaters on February 10, 2018.

== Reception ==
The film ranked at number five in the mini-theater ranking in its opening weekend, later rose to number four the following week.
