= Chiaki Kon =

Japanese anime director

- 今 千秋
- Born: September 29; Chiba Prefecture, Japan
- Occupation: Anime director
- Years active: 1998—
- Notable work: Higurashi When They Cry; The World's Greatest First Love; Sailor Moon Crystal (Season 3 & Eternal); You and Idol Pretty Cure

Japanese name
- Kanji: 今 千秋
- Hiragana: こん ちあき
- Romanization: Kon Chiaki

Chiaki Kon (Japanese: 今 千秋, Hepburn: Kon Chiaki) is a Japanese anime director. She is known for directing Higurashi When They Cry, The World's Greatest First Love, the third season and the Eternal films of the Pretty Guardian Sailor Moon Crystal series, and You and Idol Pretty Cure.

== Biography ==
Chiaki Kon was born on September 29, at Chiba Prefecture, Japan. As a child, she used to watch and was a fan of Toei Animation's anime adaptation works, such as Saint Seiya, and Sailor Moon.

After graduating from Yoyogi Animation Academy, Kon interned at Pierrot, under anime director Jun Kamiya. She provided production advancement, and assistant storyboard episode 28 of Neo Ranga for Kamiya.

Kon then directed the anime adaptations of Higurashi When They Cry series at Studio Deen from 2006–2008 (including Higurashi When They Cry: Kai and Umineko When They Cry). She then directed the anime adaptation of Junjō Romantica series, and the spin-off series, The World's Greatest First Love series from 2008–2011.

At J.C. Staff, Kon directed two of the Nodame Cantabile series (Nodame Cantabile: Paris arc and Nodame Cantabile: Finale) in 2008 and 2011. She then directed Golden Time in 2013.

At Toei Animation, Kon directed the HappinessCharge PreCure! movie, titled HappinessCharge PreCure! the Movie: The Ballerina of the Land of Dolls in 2014, Kon was a fan of the previous Pretty Cure series, and had a dream of directing Pretty Cure, and so she asked producer Hiroaki Shibata that she wanted to direct, and became the film's director. In 2016, Kon took Munehisa Sakai's position as a series director for Pretty Guardian Sailor Moon Crystal series after his departure, and directed the third season of the series, which covered the Infinity arc of the manga (known as Death Busters in Japan), titled Pretty Guardian Sailor Moon Crystal Season III.

Kon then directed the Sasuke Shinden: Book of Sunrise arc of Naruto Shippuden at Pierrot in late 2016. Then, she directed Back Street Girls at J.C. Staff, and Tokimeki Restaurant: Miracle 6 film at Production I.G in 2018.

Kon was initially set to direct the new Sanrio anime, titled Mewkledreamy for J.C. Staff, but later stepped down as a project consultant for unknown reasons, and her role was taken over by Hiroaki Sakurai.

In 2017, it was announced that Kon had returned to direct the fourth season of the Pretty Guardian Sailor Moon Crystal series, covering the Dream arc of the manga (known as Dead Moon in Japan). The fourth season was produced as a two-part theatrical anime film, titled Pretty Guardian Sailor Moon Eternal The Movie. The two-part film was animated with Toei Animation and Studio Deen, and was released in Japanese theaters in 2021, with the first film on January 8, and the second film on February 11. That same year in 2021, Kon directed The Way of the Househusband at J.C. Staff, and was released on Netflix.

== Filmography ==
=== TV series ===
Year	Show	Season	Episodes	Credit	Note
1998	Neo Ranga	1	1-2, 11-12, 21-22, 35-36, 43-44	Production Advancement	
2004	Midori Days	1	1-13	Storyboard, Dramatization	
2004	Bleach	1	15, 33	Storyboard, Episode Director	
2006	Higurashi When They Cry	1	26	Series Director, Storyboard (eps. 1, 3, 15, 25-26), Episode Director (1, 11, 26)	
2006	Shōnen Onmyōji	1	1	Opening Animation	
2007	Higurashi When They Cry Kai	2	24	Series Director, Unit Director, Storyboard (eps. 2, 11, 24), Episode Director (eps. 2, 19, 24)	
2008	Junjō Romantica	1	1-12	Director	
2008	Nodame Cantabile: Paris	1	1-11	Director, Episode Director (ED; eps. 1–2, 10), Storyboard (OP, ED; eps. 1, 10)	
2009	Youth That Can Bloom	1	1-23	Director, Storyboard (eps.1)	
2010	Maiden Spirit Zakuro	1	1-13	Director, Storyboard (OP; eps. 1, 6), Episode Director (OP, ED; ep. 1)	
2010	Nodame Cantabile: Finale	1	1-11	Director, Episode Director (OP, ED; eps. 3, 8, 11), Storyboard (OP, ED; eps. 3, 11)	
2011	The World's Greatest First Love	1	1-12	Director, Storyboard & Unit Director (OP, ED)	
2011	The World's Greatest First Love 2	1	1-12	Director, Script (eps. 12)	
2011	Chihayafuru	1	23	Storyboard (eps. 23)	
2013	Hetalia The Beautiful World	1	1–4, 11-13	Episode Director (1-4), Storyboard (1-4, 11-13)	
2013	Devils and Realist	1	1-12	Director, Series Composition (eps. 4, 6, 10), Storyboard (OP, ED; eps. 1, 9, 11), Unit Director (OP, ED)	
2013–14	Golden Time	1	1-24	Director, Episode Director (eps. 6, 22, 24), Storyboard (OP 1 and 2; eps. 20, 22, 24)	
2013–14	DokiDoki! PreCure	1	3, 9, 16	Episode Director (eps. 3), Storyboard (eps. 3, 9, 16)	^{a}
2014–15	HappinessCharge PreCure!	1	24	Storyboard (eps. 24)	^{a}
2016	Pretty Guardian Sailor Moon Crystal Season III	1	1-13	Series Director, Episode Director & Storyboard (OP, ED; eps. 1, 7, 13)	Death Busters arc
2016	Naruto: Shippuden	1	484-488	Director, Episode Director & Storyboard (eps. 484, 488)	22nd season (Sasuke Shinden: Book of Sunrise)
2017	Kirakira Pretty Cure a la Mode	1	17, 34	Storyboard (eps. 17, 34)	
2017	Boruto: Naruto Next Generations	1	3, 9, 11, 16, 23, 25	Storyboard (eps. 3, 9, 11, 16, 23, 25)	
2018	Back Street Girls	1	1-10	Director, Episode Director (eps. 1–10), Storyboard (OP; eps. 1–10)	
2020	Mewkledreamy	1	1–2, 10	Project Consultant, Episode Director & Storyboard (eps. 1–2), Script (eps. 10)	
2021	The Way of the Househusband	2	1–10	Director, Episode Director (eps. 1–5), Storyboard (ED; eps. 1–5), Unit Director (ED), Insert Song Performance (Crimecatch Policure)	
2021–22	Tropical-Rouge! Pretty Cure	1	21, 30	Storyboard (eps. 21, 30)	
2022–23	Play It Cool, Guys	1	1-24	Director, Script (eps. 10, 18), Episode Director (eps. 1–2, 9-10, 24), Storyboard (OP1-2; eps. 1–11, 24)	
2023	Sacrificial Princess and the King of Beasts	1	1-24	Director, Storyboard (OP1-2, ED1-2)	
2023–24	Soaring Sky! Pretty Cure	1	21, 36, 41	Storyboard (eps. 21, 36, 41)	
2024–25	Wonderful Pretty Cure!	1	4, 10, 18	Storyboard (eps. 4, 10, 18)	
2025–26	You and Idol Pretty Cure	1		Series Director, Episode Director (eps. 1, 28, 42, 49), Storyboard (OP; eps. 1, 3, 49), Script (eps. 3), Unit Director (OP), Script (eps. 3, 14, 22, 27, 39, 41)	^{a}
2027	Nanatsu-ya: Shinobu and Her Jewelry Box	1		Director	

- ^aThe work where Chiaki Kon was credited as "Chiaki Inaba" (いなば ちあき, Inaba Chiaki) pseudonym.

=== Films ===
Year	Film	Credit	Note
2014	The World's Greatest First Love: The Case of Takafumi Yokozawa	Director, Screenplay	
2014	The World's Greatest First Love: Valentine Arc	Director	
2014	HappinessCharge PreCure! the Movie: The Ballerina of the Land of Dolls	Director	
2018	Tokimeki Restaurant: Miracle 6	Director, Screenplay	
2020	The World's Greatest First Love: Proposal Arc	Supervisor	
2021	Pretty Guardian Sailor Moon Eternal The Movie	Director	2-Part Film, Season 4 of Sailor Moon Crystal (Dead Moon arc)

=== OVAs ===
Year	OVA	Credit	Note
2007	When Cicadas Cry Extra - Cat Killing Chapter	Director	Co-Directed with Shunji Yashida
2012	Junjo Romantica	Director	

=== Theme Park attraction ===
Year	Attraction	Credit	Note
2018	Pretty Guardian Sailor Moon: The Miracle 4-D	Director, Storyboard	
2019	Pretty Guardian Sailor Moon: The Miracle 4-D ~Moon Palace arc~	Director, Storyboard	
2022	Pretty Guardian Sailor Moon: The Miracle 4-D ~Moon Palace Edition~ Deluxe	Director, Storyboard	
