= Isao Torada =

Isao Torada may refer to

- Isao Torada, a pen name used by Yūji Yamaguchi as director of AM Driver
- Isao Torada, a character in Daitokai Series
