= Digimon Data Squad =

Japanese anime television series

- Promotional poster from the series, depicting the main characters
- デジモンセイバーズ
- Genre: Adventure
- Created by: Akiyoshi Hongo
- Developed by: Ryōta Yamaguchi
- Directed by: Naoyuki Itō
- Music by: Keiichi Oku
- Country of origin: Japan
- Original language: Japanese
- No. of episodes: 48 (list of episodes)

Production
- Producers: Atsushiya Takase; Atsutoshi Umezawa; Hiroaki Shibata; Koji Kaneda; Shinichi Ikeda
- Production companies: Fuji Television; Yomiko Advertising; Toei Animation

Original release
- Network: Fuji Television
- Release: April 2, 2006 – March 25, 2007

Related
- Anime film

Digimon Savers 3D: The Digital World in Imminent Danger!
- Directed by: Nakamura Tetsuharu
- Written by: Ryota Yamaguchi
- Music by: Takanori Arisawa
- Studio: Toei Animation
- Released: July 8, 2006
- Runtime: 7 minutes
- Anime film

Ultimate Power! Activate Burst Mode!!
- Directed by: Tatsuya Nagamine
- Written by: Ryota Yamaguchi
- Music by: Keiichi Oku
- Studio: Toei Animation
- Released: December 9, 2006
- Runtime: 22 minutes
- Digimon franchise
- Digimon Adventure; Digimon Adventure 02; Digimon Adventure tri.; Digimon Tamers; Digimon Frontier; Digimon Fusion (Xros Wars); Digimon Universe: App Monsters; Digimon Adventure (2020); Digimon Ghost Game; Digimon Beatbreak

Digimon Data Squad, known in Japan as Digimon Savers (デジモンセイバーズ, Dejimon Seibāzu), is the fifth anime television series in the Digimon franchise, produced by Toei Animation. The series aired in Japan on Fuji TV from April 2006 to March 2007. A standalone film based on the series was released on December 9, 2006.

An English-language version was produced by Studiopolis, in conjunction with Toei Animation Inc., and aired in North America on Toon Disney's Jetix block from October 2007 to November 2008.

== Plot ==
The Digital Accident Tactics Squad (DATS) is a government organization established to maintain the peace between the Real World and the Digital World, transporting any Digimon back to the Digital World. Marcus, a junior high school student, becomes one of the members for the organization. He learns that the Digimon Merukimon is opposing mankind. However, the past is revealed that the scientist Akihiro Kurata was responsible for invading the Digital World. He gained the support of the government to oppose all Digimon species, claiming they were a threat to mankind. When Kurata uses Belphemon, Marcus defeats them. Before dying, Kurata uses a bomb to make the Digital World merge with the human world. While the Digimon BanchoLeomon prevents the collision, Marcus meets King Drasil (Yggdrasil), the supreme ruler who attempts to protect the Digital World by destroying mankind, since they cannot exist in both dimensions. Marcus learns that his father, Spencer, was trapped in the Digital World for ten years, because Drasil possessed Spencer's body and BanchoLeomon kept the latter's soul. After Marcus defeats Drasil, Spencer's soul returns to his body. With both worlds restored, all Digimon partners return to their own world. Five years later, Marcus and his friends embrace their future.

== Characters ==
=== Main characters ===
Marcus Damon (大門 大, Daimon Masaru)
Voiced by: Sōichirō Hoshi (Japanese); Quinton Flynn (English)
Marcus is a 14-year-old, second year junior high school student. He does not wear any goggles unlike any main leader characters in any other Japanese Digimon anime. As a delinquent, he challenges himself to become the strongest street fighter. He is partnered with Agumon after saving him from Data Squad soldiers. Marcus also appeared in the third and final season of Digimon Fusion.
Agumon (アグモン)
Voiced by: Taiki Matsuno (Japanese); Brian Beacock (English)
A small three-fingered Tyrannosaurus-themed Digimon who is the partner of Marcus Damon. Unlike the original Agumon, this Agumon possesses red training bracers around his arms. He has a very big appetite. Agumon's other forms are the horned dinosaur-like GeoGreymon (ジオグレイモン, Jiogureimon), the cyborg RizeGreymon (ライズグレイモン, Raizugureimon), and the humanoid dragon-themed ShineGreymon (シャイングレイモン, Shaingureimon).
Thomas H. Norstein (トーマ・H・ノルシュタイン, Tōma H Norushutain)
Voiced by: Hirofumi Nojima (Japanese); Crispin Freeman (English)
Thomas is a 14-year-old teenage genius of Japanese and Austrian descent. He comes from a privileged background and his tendency to rely on carefully planned strategies causes him to clash with Marcus at times.
Gaomon (ガオモン)
Voiced by: Kazuya Nakai (Japanese); Skip Stellrecht (English)
An akita-themed Digimon in boxing gloves who is the partner of Thomas H. Norstein. Gaomon's other forms are the akita-themed Gaogamon (ガオガモン) whose claws emerge from his gloves, the humanoid cyborg wolf-themed MachGaogamon (マッハガオガモン, Mahhagaogamon), and the wolf/knight-themed MirageGaogamon (ミラージュガオガモン, Mirājugaogamon).
Yoshino "Yoshi" Fujieda (藤枝 淑乃, Fujieda Yoshino)
Voiced by: Yui Aragaki (Japanese); Colleen O'Shaughnessey (English)
Yoshi is an 18-year-old field agent at DATS. She mediates the team and acts like a big sister.
Lalamon (ララモン, Raramon)
Voiced by: Yukana (Japanese); Dorothy Elias-Fahn (English)
A bud-themed Digimon who is the partner of Yoshi Fujieda. Lalamon's other forms are the sunflower-themed Sunflowmon (サンフラウモン, Sanfuraumon), the lilac/fairy-themed Lilamon (ライラモン, Lilamon; Rairamon), and the rose/fairy-themed Rosemon (ロゼモン, Rozemon).
Keenan Crier (野口 郁人, Noguchi Ikuto)
Voiced by: Rie Kugimiya (Japanese); Brianne Siddall (English)
Keenan is a young boy who goes missing in the Digital World when a lab experiment had gone awry. He grew up with prejudice against humans when raised as a semi-feral child by a Frigimon and later by Merukimon.
Falcomon (ファルコモンFarukomon)
Voiced by: Chie Kōjiro (Japanese); Steve Blum (English)
The partner of Keenan Crier. Unlike the original Falcomon, this subspecies of Falcomon is a great horned owl/ninja-themed Digimon. His other forms are the ostrich/ninja-themed Peckmon (ペックモン, Pekkumon), the Yatagarasu-themed Crowmon (ヤタガラモン, Yatagaramon), and the humanoid armored raven-themed Ravemon (レイヴモン, Reivumon).

=== Recurring characters ===
==== DATS ====
Richard Sampson (薩摩 廉太郎, Satsuma Rentarō)
Voiced by: Taiten Kusunoki (Japanese); Jamieson Price (English)
The leader of DATS under the rank of Commander.
Kudamon (クダモン)
Voiced by: Nanaho Katsuragi (Japanese); Sam Riegel (English)
A kuda-gitsune-themed Digimon and the partner of Richard Sampson. Unlike the original Kudamon, this subspecies is depicted with retractable hind limbs. His other forms include the kamaitachi-themed Reppamon (レッパモン), the Qilin-themed Chirinmon (チィリンモン), and the Sleipnir/centaur-themed Kentaurosmon (スレイプモン, Sureipumon) who is later revealed to be a member of the Royal Knights.
Miki Kurosaki (黒崎 美樹, Kurosaki Miki)
Voiced by: Ai Nagano (Japanese); Kate Higgins (English)
A member of DATS.
PawnChessmon Black (ポーンチェスモン 黒, Pōnchesumon kuro)
A pawn-themed Digimon and the partner of Miki. He doesn't speak and Miki names his attacks. His other forms are the knight/centaur-themed KnightChessmon Black (ナイトチェスモン 黒, Naitochesumon kuro) and the rook/fortress-themed RookChessmon (ルークチェスモン, Rūkuchesumon).
Megumi Shirakawa (白川 惠, Shirakawa Megumi)
Voiced by: Yukiko Hanioka (Japanese); Stephanie Sheh (English)
A member of DATS.
PawnChessmon White (ポーンチェスモン 白, Pōnchesumon shiro)
A pawn-themed Digimon and the partner of Megumi. Like PawnChessmon Black, he doesn't speak and Megumi names his attacks. His other forms are the knight/centaur-themed KnightChessmon White (ナイトチェスモン 白, Naitochesumon shiro), and the bishop-themed BishopChessmon (ビショップチェスモン, Bishoppuchesumon).
Homer Yushima (湯島 浩, Yushima Hiroshi)
Voiced by: Yūichi Nagashima (Japanese); Kirk Thornton (English)
An old fisherman who is secretly a member of DATS under the rank of Commander General.
Kamemon (カメモン)
Voiced by: Naozumi Takahashi (Japanese); Jeff Nimoy (English)
A turtle/computer mouse-themed Digimon who is Homer's partner. Kamemon doesn't talk much. His other forms are the kappa/CD-themed Gwappamon (ガワッパモン, Gawappamon) and the Sha Wujing-themed Shawjamon (シャウジンモン, Shaujinmon).

==== Family members ====
Sarah Damon (大門 小百合, Daimon Sayuri)
Voiced by: Mariko Kouda (Japanese); Mary Elizabeth McGlynn (English)
Mother of Marcus and Kristy Damon.
Kristy Damon (大門 知香, Daimon Chika)
Voiced by: Kokoro Kikuchi (Japanese); Melissa Fahn (English)
Younger sister of Marcus Damon. She later befriends a male Biyomon.
Biyomon (ピヨモン, Piyomon)
Voiced by: Haruhi Nanao (Japanese); Terrence Stone (English)
A pink bird-themed Digimon that Kristy befriends. Unlike the previous depictions of Biyomon, this version is male. His other forms are the horned bald eagle-themed Aquilamon (アクィラモン, Akwiramon) and the garuda-themed Garudamon (ガルダモン).
Spencer Damon (大門 英, Daimon Suguru)
Voiced by: Hozumi Gōda (Japanese); Jeff Nimoy (English)
The father of Marcus and Kristy and the husband of Sarah. When looking for King Drasil, Spencer ended up possessed by King Drasil with Spencer's consciousness ending up in the body of BanchoLeomon.
BanchoLeomon (バンチョーレオモン, Banchōreomon)
Voiced by: Eiji Takemoto (Japanese); Wally Wingert (English)
A humanoid lion/bancho-themed Digimon who became Spencer's partner and companion. At the time when Spencer got possessed by King Drasil, his consciousness inhabited BanchoLeomon's body.
Franz Norstein (フランツ・ノルシュタイン, Furantsu Norushutain)
Voiced by: Hiroki Yasumoto (Japanese); Adam Bitterman (English)
Franz is Thomas' rich father. He left Thomas' mother at some point and wasn't there when she died from a runaway truck which strained their family relationship. Franz and his mother allowed Thomas to live with him. Sometime later, he was approached by Akihiro Kurata who offered to cure his daughter by turning her into a Bio-Hybrid. When Homer and Kamemon tried to remove Relena from the compound and got caught, Homer tried to reason with Franz not to go ahead with Kurata's offer. Following Kurata's defeat and disappearance, Franz and his servants tried to evacuate Relena by airplane when it gets attacked by LoadKnightmon. After Thomas and MirageGaogamon Burst Mode had slain LoadKnightmon, Thomas told Franz that he will find a cure for Relena. Thomas managed to do that years later.
Relena Norstein (リリーナ・ノルシュタイン, Rirīna Norushutain)
Voiced by: Oma Ichimura (Japanese); Kari Wahlgren (English)
The daughter of Franz and the half-sister of Thomas. Since she was born, Relena contracted a rare disease that caused Franz to accept a deal from Akihiro Kurata to find a cure for her. This plan involved her being turned into a Bio-Hybrid. Following Kurata's defeat and disappearance, Relena was evacuated by her father and his servants where their airplane got attacked by LoadKnightmon. After MirageGaogamon defeated LoadKnightmon, Thomas told his father that he'll find a cure for Relena....which he managed to do years later.
Thomas's grandmother (トーマの祖母, Tōma no soba)
Voiced by: Yuko Tachibana (Japanese); Susan Silo (English)
The unnamed grandmother of Thomas and mother of Franz who was seen in a flashback. After Thomas' mother was killed, she did argue with Franz about what to do with Thomas which got overheard by him. Thomas' grandmother relented in letting him stay with her family.
Kevin Crier (野口 憲治, Noguchi Kenji) and Michelle Crier (野口 美鈴, Noguchi Misuzu)
Kevin Crier Voiced by: Hiroshi Naka (Japanese); Joe Ochman (English)
Michelle Crier Voiced by: Nina Kumagaya (Japanese); Michelle Ruff (English)
Kevin and Michelle Crier are scientists and the parents of Keenan who created a Digital Gate that a younger Keenan was sucked into. They joined an expedition to the Digital World to look for Keenan and haven't been able to find him. Some years later, Keenan reunited with his biological parents at the cost of a Hagurumon appearing in their house and taking control of it. After Hagurumon was defeated at the cost of the Crier family's house, Kevin and Michelle were arrested by Director Hashima's men for illegally creating a Digital Gate causing Keenan and Falcomon to flee. While in a guarded hotel room, Kevin and Michelle were approached by Marcus, Thomas, and Yoshino to help them get to the Digital World to stop Akihiro Kurata's Digimon genocide. They agreed and allowed Keenan to go with them.
Ruka Crier (野口 ルカ, Noguchi Ruka)
The baby daughter of Kevin and Michelle and baby sister of Keenan.

==== Other recurring characters ====
Hashima (羽柴, Hashiba)
Voiced by: Satoshi Tsuruoka (Japanese); Doug Stone (English)
The Director of the Japanese Confidentiality Ministry that oversees DATS. Hashima later appeared as an NPC in Digimon Masters.

=== Antagonists ===
King Drasil (イグドラシル, Igudorashiru; Yggdrasil)
Voiced by: Rica Fukami (Japanese); Mona Marshall, Jonathan David Cook (7D6), Mari Devon (core) (English)
King Drasil is a host computer being in the form of a tree. Marcus' father Spencer Damon first mentioned him in a flashback during his chat with Merukimon as he was looking for King Drasil. He took Kurata's actions as a threat to the Digital World and sends the Royal Knights to attack humanity in retaliation. Drasil initially used the body of Marcus's father Spencer Damon before transferring into his King Drasil 7D6 avatar body, ultimately deciding to destroy both worlds to start anew. But upon being defeated by Marcus and Agumon, Drasil accepts his defeat and enters a deep sleep after reviving Spencer.

==== Merukimon's group ====
Merukimon (メルクリモン, Merukurimon)
Voiced by: Kosei Hirota (Japanese); Richard Epcar (English)
A mega-level Mercury/wolf-themed Shaman Digimon who raised Keenan and met Spencer Damon a decade before the events of the series, believing there can be co-existence until Kurata's actions convinced Merukimon that humans are attacking the Digimon. But learning the truth from Kurata himself, Merukimon decided to try believing in Spencer's words again and sacrificed his life to save Keenan, Marcus, and the others from Kurata's Gizumon.
Gotsumon (ゴツモン)
Voiced by: Ken Maeda (Japanese); Michael Lindsay (English)
A rookie-level rock-themed Digimon who is Merukimon's top minion. After most of Merukimon's minions were defeated, Gotsumon Digivolved into the meteorite-themed Meteormon (インセキモン, Insekimon) and was reduced to a Digi-Egg by RizeGreymon. Sometime after Belphemon's defeat, Gotsumon was reborn and had no memory of the Data Squad members.
Yanmamon (ヤンマモン)
A jumbo dragonfly-themed Digimon that serves as Gotsumon's mode of transportation.
SaberLeomon (サーベルレオモン, Sāberureomon)
Voiced by: Hitoshi Bifu (Japanese); Paul St. Peter (English)
A mega-level lion/Smilodon-themed Beast Digimon and associate who hates all humans because of their actions against Digimon. He comes to the real world to fight the Data Squad only to be stunned by Gizumon's laser and was destroyed by RizeGreymon. Afterwards, his DigiEgg form deleted.

==== Akihiro Kurata's Army ====
Akihiro Kurata (倉田 明宏, Kurata Akihiro)
Voiced by: Masami Kikuchi (Japanese); Brian Palermo (English)
An evil, hateful, and fierce mad scientist. Kurata was originally Spencer Damon's assistant during their exploration of the Digital World who believed Digimon are a threat to humans as he seeks to completely destroy most of them with his artificial Gizumon while subjugating the rest for world dominion. When the Tactics Squad learned his true plans, he turns the Confidentiality Ministry on them while awakening Belphemon and sending his Bio-Hybrids (humans with Digimon data in them) after them. Kurata later cut a deal with Thomas' dad where he will cure his daughter by turning her into a Bio-Hybrid. Later, he takes control of Belphemon himself. After Belphemon's defeat, he ends up becoming a victim of his space-oscillation bomb.
Gizumon (ギズモン)
The robotic Digimon foot soldiers of Kurata's followers with spider-like appendages. Their Champion forms are Gizumon-AT (ギズモン:AT, Gizumon: AT) who can float through the air and whose laser beams can delete a Digimon's composition data. The Gizumon's Ultimate forms are Gizumon-XT (ギズモン:XT, Gizumon: XT) who are more humanoid and have more lethal attacks.
Belphemon (ベルフェモン, Berufemon)
Voiced by: Masami Kikuchi (Japanese); Kyle Hebert (English)
A slothful, catastrophic, and aggressive Demon Lord Digimon who is sealed for years before Kurata freed him and later awakened. Belphemon Rage Mode is a Belphegor-themed Digimon. Belphemon Sleep Mode resembles a giant sleeping chibi version of it with chained-up arms and an alarm clock on it.
Kouki Tsubasa (翼 聖, Tsubasa Kouki)
Voiced by: KENN (Japanese); Dave Wittenberg (English)
The leader of the Bio-Hybrids that work for Kurata who is the more vicious of the group. His first Bio Hybrid form is the thunderbird-themed BioThunderbirdmon (バイオサンダーバーモン, Baiosandābāmon) and his second Bio-Hybrid form is the dark dragon-themed BioDarkdramon (バイオダークドラモン, Baiodākudoramon). Kouki was defeated by Marcus and ShineGreymon which also left a DigiEgg behind. This final showdown turned out to be a diversion so that the Gizumon can fuse with a missile and take out ElDradimon.
Nanami (ナナミ)
Voiced by: Ryōko Ono (Japanese); Philece Sampler (English)
A member of the Bio-Hybrids that work for Kurata who dresses in Gothic Lolita clothing and often carries around an umbrella. Nanami is the more intelligent of the group. Her first Bio-Hybrid form is the Quetzalcōātl-themed BioQuetzalmon (バイオクアトルモン, Baiokuatorumon) and her second Bio-Hybrid form is the lotus/fairy-themed BioRotosmon (バイオロトスモン, Baiorotosumon). Before she was defeated by Thomas and MirageGaogamon which also left a DigiEgg behind, Nanami did a final attack which broke the waterfall enough to drain the lake that ElDradimon was positioned in.
Ivan (イワン, Iwan)
Voiced by: Takanori Hoshino (Japanese); Christopher Darga (English)
A Russian member of the Bio-Hybrids that work for Kurata who is the strongest of the group. His first Bio-Hybrid form is the Stegosaurus-themed BioStegomon (バイオステゴモン, Baiosutegomon) and his second Bio-Hybrid form is the Spinosaurus-themed BioSupinomon (バイオスピノモン, Baiosupinomon). During the attack on ElDradimon, Ivan was defeated by Yoshino and Rosemon which also left a DigiEgg behind. Afterwards, he did tell Yoshino that he worked for Kurata to get money for his family.

==== Royal Knights ====
The Royal Knights are the minions of King Drasil. Besides Kentaurosmon, they consist of:

Craniamon (クレニアムモン, Kureniamumon)
Voiced by: Hiroshi Kamiya (Japanese); Henry Dittman (English)
A death knight-themed Digimon and member of the Royal Knights who carries out King Drasil's orders.
Dynasmon (デュナスモン, Dyunasumon)
Voiced by: Kazunari Kojima (Japanese); Chris Edgerly (English)
A humanoid dragon/wyvern-themed Digimon and member of the Royal Knights. He once led an army of Knightmon in attacking New York City.
Gallantmon (デュークモン, Dyūkumon)
Voiced by: Masako Nozawa (Japanese); Brad Sherwood (English)
A white-armored knight-themed Digimon with a Guilmon-like face on his crest and member of the Royal Knights.
Leopardmon (ドゥフトモン, Dufutomon)
Voiced by: Takehiro Murozono (Japanese); Beau Billingslea (English)
A black panther-armored Digimon and member of the Royal Knights. Leopardmon was slain by Rosemon Burst Mode and Ravemon Burst Mode.
LoadKnightmon (ロードナイトモン, Rōdonaitomon)
Voiced by: Susumu Chiba (Japanese); Dave Bushnell (English)
A crusader-themed Digimon and member of the Royal Knights. He and his army of Knightmon attacked the airport where Franz Norstein's airplane was. LoadKnightmon was destroyed by MirageGaogamon Burst Mode.
Magnamon (マグナモン, Magunamon)
Voiced by: Tatsuhisa Suzuki (Japanese); Brian Fairlee (English)
A gold-armored dragon-themed Digimon and member of the Royal Knights.
Omnimon (オメガモン, Omegamon)
Voiced by: Hiroki Takahashi (Japanese); Peter Spellos (English)
A knight-themed Digimon with WarGreymon and MetalGarurumon-shaped hands and member of the Royal Knights. He briefly attacked an unnamed city in the Real World.
UlforceVeedramon (アルフォースブイドラモン, Arufōsubuidoramon)
Voiced by: Satoshi Tsuruoka (Japanese); Joe Ochman (English)
A dragon-themed Digimon and member of the Royal Knights. He briefly attacked Egypt with an army of Knightmon.

== Production ==
The series was announced during the December 2005 Jump Festa convention in Japan with advertisements showing a remolded Agumon as the lead Digimon. The name of the series was later revealed in January 2006 with the character designs coming a month later. The characters were designed by Sayo Aoi. It is the final Digimon series to be produced in 4:3.

== Media ==
=== Anime ===
The series aired 48 episodes on Fuji TV in Japan from April 2, 2006, to March 25, 2007. On April 25, 2007, Disney's ABC Network announced that it had signed an agreement with Toei Animation to license the show. Much of the staff that worked on Digimon: Digital Monsters, including director Jeff Nimoy, returned to work on Data Squad. The series finished airing in the US on Jetix on November 1, 2008, thirteen months after it premiered on October 1, 2007.

It was announced on February 12, 2009 that Toei Animation had signed Well Go USA with the DVD rights to Digimon Data Squad, and the first thirteen US edited English dub episodes were made available on May 26, 2009. The release of the third DVD set was canceled.

Madman Entertainment have released all episodes across four sets on Region 4 DVD in Australia and New Zealand with only the US English Edited TV dub by Studiopolis. Brazil had released several DVDs of the show. In 2014, Cinedigm Entertainment obtained the rights to the release of the season. A Complete Collection was released on March 11, 2014, in the US.

==== Theme songs ====
Opening themes

- "Gōing! Going! My soul!!" (強ing! Going! My soul!!) by Dynamite SHU
  - Episodes: 1-29
- "Hirari" (ヒラリ) by Kōji Wada
  - Episodes 30-48

Ending themes

- "One Star" by Yousuke Itou
  - Episodes: 1-24
- "Ryūsei" (流星; "Meteor") by MiyuMiyu
  - Episodes: 25-47

Insert song

- "Believer" by Ikuo

=== Video games ===
The anime received five related video games.

- Digimon World DS features several Digimon Data Squad characters, but does not focus on them. As the game was released internationally before Data Squad was dubbed into different languages, it retains the original Japanese names of the DATS team, who appear in certain quests.
- Digimon World Data Squad focuses on the primary characters of the anime, but tells a different story from it. It involves the members of DATS coming into conflict with the Seven Great Demon Lords.
- Digimon World: Dawn and Dusk are sequels to Digimon World DS with slightly different stories from each other. At the end of the game, the four main characters from Data Squad appear to battle the main character.
- Digimon Masters is an MMORPG where players assume the roles of the DATS team members.
