= Maria Yamamoto =

Japanese voice actress and singer

- 山本 麻里安
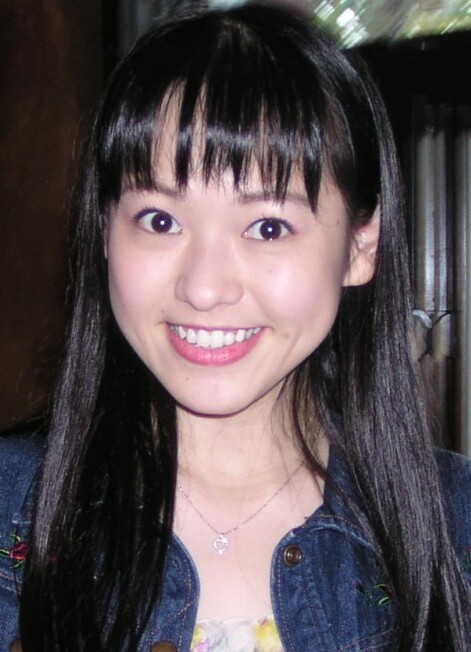
- Yamamoto at FanimeCon in 2005
- Born: September 11, 1981 (age 45); Tokyo, Japan
- Occupations: Voice actress; singer; screenwriter
- Years active: 1998–present
- Agent: 81 Produce
- Musical career
- Genres: J-pop; anison
- Instrument: Vocals
- Labels: Warner Music Japan; Avex Trax
- Website: Official profile

Maria Yamamoto (山本 麻里安, Yamamoto Maria) is a Japanese voice actress and singer formerly with I'm Enterprise and now affiliated with 81 Produce.

== Filmography ==
=== Animation ===
List of voice performances in animation
Year	Title	Role	Notes	Source
1998	Princess Rouge	Megumi Kana		
1998	His and Her Circumstances	Kano Miyazawa	Also theme song performance "Kaze Hiita Yoru" with Yuki Watanabe	
1999	Amazing Nurse Nanako	Nanako Shichigusa	Theme song performance	
1999	Seraphim Call	Urara Tachibana	Ep. 11, 12; Also theme song performance "Yes, it's my true love"	
2000	Mon Colle Knights	Leprechaun, others		
2000	NieA 7		Theme song performance "Venus and a Small God"	
2000	Hand Maid May	Cyberdoll May		
2001	Great Dangaioh	Kaori Tsukishiro		
2001	Chance Pop Session	Nozomi Kaibara	Theme song performance "Pure Blue" and "Love Forever" with Atsuko Enomoto and Mayumi Iizuka	
2001	Magical Nyan Nyan Taruto	Chitose	Theme song performance "Hana Uta no Hareruya!" with Hisayo Mochizuki and Masayo Kurata	
2001	A Little Snow Fairy Sugar		Theme song performance "Snow Flower"	
2002	Petite Princess Yucie	Yucie	Theme song performance "Egao no Tensai" with Yuki Matsuoka, Yukari Fukui, Ayako Kawasumi, Fumiko Orikasa	
2003	Machine Robo Rescue	Aki Saotome		
2003	Mermaid Melody Pichi Pichi Pitch	Ghost girl		
2003	Cinderella Boy	Maya, Lyan Rain		
2003	Yami to Bōshi to Hon no Tabibito	Kuiru		
2003	Guardian Hearts	Aya Kureha	OVA ep. 3	
2004	Sgt. Frog	Nishizawa house maid		
2004	AM Driver	Sissy Croft		
2004	Grrl Power	High school girl	OVA	
2004	Elfen Lied	Kanae, Kisaragi, Saito, Aiko Takada, others		
2004	Ryusei Sentai Musumet ja:流星戦隊ムスメット	Shinobu Nakagawa		
2004	Bleach	Hinako Shijō		
2005–07	Onegai My Melody series	Tsukune Komadori	Also ~Kuru Kuru Shuffle~	
2005	Akahori Gedou Hour Rabuge	Maria Yamamoto-nyan		
2006	Papillon Rose: The New Season	Tsubomi / Papillon Rose	TV series	
2006–07	Kyō no Go no Ni series	Natsumi Hirakawa	OVAs	
2006	Love Get Chu	Amane Ōhara		
2006	School Rumble: Second Semester	Saeko		
2006	D.Gray-man	Katia		
2007	Demon Prince Enma	Sacchan	OVA ep. 3	
2007	El Cazador de la Bruja	Rita		
2007	Tōka Gettan	Hibari	Also wrote an episode	
2008	Porphy no Nagai Tabi	Sophia		
2008	Golgo 13	Female secretary		
2008	Scarecrow Man	Tabigeinin no musume		
2009	Viper's Creed	Sprout		
2009	Slayers Evolution-R	Taforashia national		
2009–10	Gokujō!! Mecha Mote Iinchō series	Nanoka Toda	Also Second Collection	
2009	Element Hunters	Natasha		
2011	Hyouge Mono	Sen		
2012	Kuromajo-san ga Toru!!	Meg Shion		
2012	Humanity Has Declined	Silk Tree Team Rep.		
2013	Hana no Zundamaru	Sayuri, Kemeko	ONA	
2014	Re: ␣ hamatora	Mina		

=== Film ===
List of voice performances in feature films
Year	Title	Role	Notes	Source
2002	Guilstein ja:ギルステイン	Iyu		
2004	Pokémon: Destiny Deoxys	Catherine		

=== Video games ===
List of voice performances in video games
Year	Title	Role	Notes	Source
1999	Memories Off	Ayaka Hizuki	PS1/PS2; Also Mix in 2003, Complete	
2001	True Love Story 3	Emi Honjo	PS1/PS2	
2001	Metal Gear Solid 2: Sons of Liberty	Emma Emmerich	PS1/PS2	
2003	Ys I & II: Eternal Story	Liria	PS1/PS2	
2003	Shōjo Yoshitsune Den ja:少女義経伝	Minamoto no Kuraka	PS1/PS2	
2004	Neon Genesis Evangelion: Shinji Ikari Raising Project	Satsuki Ooi	PC	
2005	Girls Bravo Romance15's	Kanata	PS1/PS2	
2005	Memories Off After Rain series	Ayaka Hizuki	PS1/PS2; Vol. 1 and 3	
2005	Shōjo Yoshitsune-den 弐 〜 Koku o koeru chigiri 〜 ja:少女義経伝・弐 〜刻を超える契り〜	Minamoto no Kuraka	PS1/PS2	
2006	Arcana Heart	Tsuzune Kasuga, Fiona Mayfield	PS1/PS2	
2007	Detective Evangelion	Satsuki Ooi	PS1/PS2	
2007	Soul Nomad & the World Eaters	Euphoria, Asagi	PS1/PS2	
2007	Corpse Seed	Marie Rose Mayfield	Also Plant Revolution in 2008	
2008	CR Sengoku Otome series	Imagawa Yoshimoto	Other; Also CR Sengoku Otome 2	
2009	Suggoi! Arcana Heart 2	Fiona Mayfield	PS1/PS2	
2010	Corpse Seed 2	Marie Rose Mayfield	Wii	
2011	Arcana Heart 3	Fiona Mayfield	Also Love Max! in 2014	
2013	Corpse Seed 3	Marie Rose Mayfield	Also Heartclub Extreme in 2015	
2018	Corpse Seed 4	Marie Rose Mayfield	Switch	

=== Drama CD ===
List of voice performances in audio recordings
Title	Role	Notes	Source
The Empty Cosmos	Marine Koizumi		
Hand Maid May	Cyberdoll May		
Pani Poni series	Behoimi		
Taishou Yakyuu Musume. Otometachi no Hiking	Akiko Ogasawara		
Chance Pop Session			
True Love Story 3	Emi Honjou		
CLAMP Gakuen Kaiki Genzou Kenkyuukai Jiken File	Rion Ibuki		

=== Other dubbing ===
List of voice performances in outside dubbing
Title	Role	Notes	Source
My First Wedding	Vanessa	Voice dub for Rachael Leigh Cook	
Maestro! Jump in Music	Moderato (child)		
