= Tōka Gettan =

Japanese adult video game

- Tōka Gettan logo.

桃華月憚
- Genre: Drama, Fantasy, Romance
- Manga
- Written by: Aguri Soragata
- Illustrated by: Yukio Kumoya
- Published by: Kadokawa Shoten
- Magazine: Comptiq
- Original run: December 10, 2005 – 2008
- Volumes: 2
- Anime television series
- Directed by: Yūji Yamaguchi
- Written by: Tomomi Mochizuki
- Music by: Akifumi Tada
- Studio: Studio Deen
- Licensed by: NA: Sentai Filmworks
- Original network: BS Asahi, Tokyo MX, Sun TV, AT-X
- Original run: April 3, 2007 – September 24, 2007
- Episodes: 26
- Video game
- Developer: Root
- Publisher: Orbit (Windows), Kadokawa Shoten (PS2)
- Genre: Eroge, Visual novel
- Platform: Windows, PlayStation 2
- Released: May 25, 2007 (Windows); October 1, 2009 (PS2)

Tōka Gettan (桃華月憚) is a Japanese adult visual novel developed by Root, and published by Orbit, also known for the creation of the Yami to Bōshi to Hon no Tabibito visual novel. The game was released in Japan on May 25, 2007, in regular and deluxe editions. A PlayStation 2 version, called Tōka Gettan: Kōfū no Ryōō (桃華月憚 ～光風の陵王～), was released on October 1, 2009, with adult content removed. A manga adaptation was serialized in Kadokawa Shoten's Comptiq. A 26-episode anime adaptation produced by Studio Deen aired between April and September 2007.

The series is a spin-off of Moonlight Lady, and as such the original name of the game was Tōka Gettan: Moonlight Lady II (桃華月憚 ～顔のない月II～, Tōka Gettan ~Kao no Nai Tsuki II~). The title was later shortened to simply Tōka Gettan and the subtitle was removed.

== Plot ==
Tōka Gettan is set in the land of Kamitsumihara, where traces of magic and legend can still be seen. The land has been under the protection of the Kamiazuma clan since it was founded. The story revolves around Tōka Kamiazuma, the main protagonist, and his encounter with a young girl named Momoka Kawakabe who comes to stay with the clan. Their meeting sets off a chain of events that would bring an ancient legend to life.

== Characters ==
Tōka Kamiazuma (守東 桃香, Kamiazuma Tōka)
Voiced by: Taiyo Sorano (PC), Daisuke Kishio (PS2), Mariya Ise (anime)
Tōka is the protagonist of the series and the adopted child of Yumiko Kamiazuma. He has a sacred, soul-eating blade, called the Stone Sword within his chest. Some believe him to be the reincarnation of Isamihiko, the former wielder of the Stone Sword. In reality, he is a non-human replacement of Yumiko's lost daughter, (who was also named Tōka) and the Stone Sword is an integral part of his body, since he was specifically born to wield it.

Tōka has two different forms in the series. As Yumiko's "daughter", he has long hair and wears a red kimono, while normally he is short-haired and wears a casual black shirt and trousers, or a school uniform. Regardless of his outer appearance, his personality is always rather blunt, callous and short-spoken. The only people he seems to care about are his adoptive mother, Yumiko, and Momoka. Despite loving Momoka he plans to end the curse, no matter the sacrifices he must do.

Momoka Kawakabe (川壁 桃花, Kawakabe Momoka)
Voiced by: Soyogi Tono (PC), Tae Okajima (PS2), Saori Hayami (anime)
Momoka is the female protagonist who embodies the goddess Sei. Her most outstanding quality is her infinite appetite as she often seen with food in her mouth; she is also comparable to a puppy with her very accurate ability to catch food in her mouth. She is very infatuated with Tōka and has a very bright personality compared to Tōka's gloomy attitude. Later it is hinted that she, as Sei, was the one who killed Isamihiko, the former wielder of the Sword Stone. It is revealed at the end that she is a character created in the story of Yumiko, and so, she only can exist as Momoka inside the Land of Kamitsumihara. Also, as a goddess she is needed to break the curse but that would make her disappear along with her sisters, the other goddesses. Still, she is willing to help Touka, and promises him that if they ever meet again she will definitely not hesitate in making their love come true.

Yumiko Kamiazuma (守東 由美子, Kamiazuma Yumiko)
Voiced by: Mina Motoyama (PC), Airi Yoshida (PS2), Miki Itou (anime)
Yumiko is Tōka's adoptive mother and the daughter of Kiyoharu and Yuriko. She is a novelist and her writings usually have a supernatural effect over the land. She has a very childish personality which causes problems for her maid, Nene. Her attitude is very erotic and she sometimes molests Tōka. She is the current host for the goddess Juna. Due to mental scars caused by her traumatic childhood, Yumiko is unable to live normally without the presence of Juna. In episode 19, it is disclosed that she has suffered from sexual abuse at the hands of Kiyotsugu, who- since he believes he is Kiyoharu (Yumiko's father)- also believes that Yumiko is her mother Yuriko, who Kiyoharu also molested.

Yuriko (由利子)
Yuriko is Yumiko's mother. It is revealed that since childhood, she was sexually abused by her brother Kiyoharu, escalating to the point he raped and impregnated her. Despite this, however, Yuriko refused to abort and raised Yumiko on her own.

Nene Midō (御堂 寧々, Midō Nene)
Voiced by: Minami Hokuto (PC), Hitomi (PS2), Ayumi Fujimura (anime)
Nene is Yumiko's maid who has magical powers. Her lifespan is different from ordinary humans, and has enabled her to live for thousands of years. She is a wise person, excellent cook and has knowledge of various medicines. Her mother is an immortal witch, Yukihime, and she has three sisters, Kaya, Anna, and Sarara (who was an incarnation of Eve).

Makoto Inukai (犬飼 真琴, Inukai Makoto)
Voiced by: Chihiro Matsutaka (PC), Kaori Mizuhashi (PS2), Eri Kitamura (anime)
Makoto is a young girl who attends Tōka's Academy, and has the spirit of the Great Dragon inside of her. She seems to have an attraction to Momoka, similar to Shoko's attraction to her. When playing her flute, she can wield the Dragon's power, which resonates with the Stone sword within Tōka. She tends to add Italian words or phrases to her speech, often music-related.

Shōko Rokujō (六条 章子, Rokujō Shōko)
Voiced by: Kai Sakurazaka (PC), Yuuhi Mayama (PS2), Yu Kobayashi (anime)
Shōko is the chairperson of the Lotus Association. She often has disputes with the Butterfly Triplets. She drives an indestructible, flying car, often in places where cars should not go (i.e. school hallways). Her personality turns rough when she loses her glasses. She has an obsessive attraction to Makoto, as she often fantasizes about her and the latter in romantic and even perverted scenarios.

Kikyō (鬼梗)
Voiced by: Ayana Sumoto (PC), Haruka Shimazaki (PS2), Yu Kobayashi (anime)
Kikyō is the head of the Student Council. She is the immortal guardian of the land of Kamiazuma who has been fending off powers of Darkness since the early ages.

Haruhiko Kamiazuma (守東 春彦, Kamiazuma Haruhiko)
Voiced by: Uta Kijima (PC), Takahiro Mizushima (PS2), Kenji Nomura (anime)
Haruhiko is the son of Kiyotsugu Kamiazuma. He is a major playboy, although his confidence with his own attractiveness is usually shown to be rather exaggerated, making him serve mainly as a comedic relief. He has a scar on his back that was caused by the Stone Sword when he was a child.

Kiyotsugu Kamiazuma (守東 益之, Kamiazuma Kiyoharu)
Voiced by: Yaiba Aoshima (PC), Ken Narita (PS2), Shou Hayami (anime)
Kiyotsugu is the father of Haruhiko, and the uncle of Yumiko. Due to an incident in the past, his brother Kiyoharu, who had gone insane, implanted a shard of a magical mask into Kiyotsugu's eye. The shard, containing Kiyoharu's memories, caused Kiyotsugu to believe that he was his brother. As Kiyoharu, he has mistaken Yumiko for his sister Yuriko, and has put her through the same sexual abuse that Kiyoharu had put Yuriko through.

Butterfly Triplets (胡蝶三姉妹, Kochō San Shimai)
They are the demonic sisters that head the society in opposition to the Lotus Association. Their followers are mainly seen with black veils over their faces. They can transform into butterflies (hence their name) and they usually openly display their demonic powers. For a certain duration of the series, they had an interest in publishing yaoi dōjinshi featuring Tōka.

Hibari (ひばり)
Voiced by: Miru (PC), Oma Ichimura (PS2), Maria Yamamoto (anime)
Tsubame (つばめ)
Voiced by: Miru (PC), Oma Ichimura (PS2), Akeno Watanabe (anime)
Suzume (すずめ)
Voiced by: Miru (PC), Oma Ichimura (PS2), Noriko Shitaya (anime)

== Media ==
=== Manga ===
A manga adaptation titled Tōka Gettan: Moonlight Lady II (桃華月憚 ～顔のない月II～, Tōka Gettan ~Kao no Nai Tsuki II~), written by Aguri Soragata and illustrated by Yukio Kumoya, was serialized in Kadokawa Shoten's Comptiq between December 10, 2005, and 2008. Two tankōbon volumes were released: the first on August 9, 2007, and the second on January 10, 2008.

=== Anime ===
A 26-episode anime adaptation by Studio Deen aired in Japan between April 3, 2007, and September 24, 2007. The series aired backwards chronologically with episode one being the last episode and episode twenty-six being the first in the story's internal timeline. Chronologically, episode 26 is first, then 24 through episode one, and episode 25 is last. The opening theme is "Yume Oboro" (ゆめおぼろ; "Dim Dreams") by Eri Kitamura with Mariya Ise, and Saori Hayami. The ending theme is "Kono Sekai ga Itsuka wa" (この世界がいつかは; "Someday This World Will Be") by Saori Hayami. The anime is licensed by Sentai Filmworks to be released on Blu-ray Disc on December 13, 2022.

=== Visual novel ===
The Tōka Gettan visual novel was released in Japan on May 25, 2007, in regular and deluxe editions. A PlayStation 2 version, called Tōka Gettan: Kōfu no Ryōō (桃華月憚 ～光風の陵王～), was released on October 1, 2009, in regular and deluxe editions, with adult content removed.

== Reception ==
Erica Friedman has shown a disdain for this anime, going so far as to say, "I can't call it a yuri anime." She also said that the series was "not good" and was not yuri like Yamibou, and found it "howlingly funny" because it was "so bad." She said that the story is "a little more complex than one might expect" but that the series wades "in a pool of Yuri of all kinds" with crushes that go nowhere. She concluded by saying that it might be entertaining if you enjoyed Yaimbou but said that due to the lack of yuri in that current anime season it gives you "something to stare at until spring."
