= I My Me! Strawberry Eggs =

Japanese anime television series

- Cover of the 2012 DVD rerelease

あぃまぃみぃ! ストロベリー・エッグ (Ai Mai Mii! Sutoroberī Eggu)
- Genre: Romantic comedy
- Created by: YOM
- Anime television series
- Directed by: Yūji Yamaguchi
- Produced by: Akio Matsuda
- Written by: Yasuko Kobayashi
- Music by: Masara Nishida
- Studio: TNK
- Licensed by: NA: Geneon
- Original network: Wowow
- Original run: July 4, 2001 – September 26, 2001
- Episodes: 13
- Manga
- Written by: YOM
- Illustrated by: Maki Fujii
- Published by: MediaWorks
- Magazine: Comic Dengeki Daioh
- Original run: December 21, 2001 – February 25, 2002

I My Me! Strawberry Eggs (あぃまぃみぃ! ストロベリー・エッグ, Ai Mai Mii! Sutoroberī Eggu), occasionally shortened to Strawberry Eggs, is a Japanese anime television series conceptualized by YOM. Produced by Pioneer LDC, Toshiba Digital Frontiers Inc., Pioneer Entertainment (USA) LP., TNK and Tokyo Broadcasting System Television, the series is directed by Yūji Yamaguchi, with Yasuko Kobayashi handling series composition, Maki Fujii designing the characters and Masara Nishida composing the music. The anime aired in Japan from July 4 to September 26, 2001, on Wowow and was licensed by Geneon Entertainment in August 2002.

== Plot ==
Hibiki Amawa is an enthusiastic young man whose dream career is to be a professional teacher, having graduated from college with a certificate in athletics. When he is unable to pay his landlady, Lulu Sanjo, the monthly rent for his apartment, he rushes off to the nearby Seitō Sannomiya Private School to apply for a position that is open, but is summarily denied employment because of his gender, as they only hire women. Offended, and more determined than ever to have his way, Hibiki vows to demonstrate the merits of his educational philosophy to his detractors, and with offered help from Lulu, agrees to disguise himself by cross-dressing in order to deceive the school's female-only administration. With assistance from some gadgets Lulu engineered for this purpose, he disguises himself very convincingly. Following an initial demonstration of his merits as an educator, he is hired.

Unfortunately for Hibiki, however, life as a gym teacher at this school does not go completely smoothly. With interpersonal conflicts among students causing fights and occasional mild missteps endangering his disguise, Hibiki must not only mediate his class, but also keep up appearances and navigate life in disguise.

== Characters ==
=== Primary characters ===
Some of the characters' surnames and the school's name are derived from train station names in the Kinki area. In addition, most of the surnames of the characters of the Seitō Sannomiya Private School, except for Fūko Kuzuha, are adopted from the names of stations on the Hanshin Main Line.

Hibiki Amawa (天和 響, Amawa Hibiki)
Voiced by: Yūji Kishi (male-Japanese), Yuki Masuda (female-Japanese), Crispin Freeman (male-English), Sally Dana (female-English)
The central protagonist of the series, Hibiki Amawa is a fairly typical college graduate whose goal is to become a professional school teacher. His life takes an unexpected turn in the process when, in order to pay off his apartment rent, he is forced to cross-dress in order to gain employment at the female-favoring Seitō Sannomiya Private School. His situation only gets more complicated when the school board grows suspicious of him, students take to fighting with each other, and one of the girls of his class (Fūko) develops romantic feelings for him.
Lulu Sanjō (三条 るる, Sanjō Ruru)
Voiced by: Kujira (Japanese); Jody Jaress (English)
Lulu Sanjō, more often referred to as "Granny" by her tenants, is the midget-size tough-as-nails, pistol-packing landlady of the Gochisō apartments, which also doubles as a school supply store that she also owns. Impressed by Hibiki's strong determination, she offers to help him in his mission, helping him disguise himself as a woman and maintain the disguise throughout his time on campus. She rides a Harley-Davidson FXSTS softail springer motorcycle with a twin cam engine. It is heavily implied that Lulu is a crossdresser as well.
Fūko Kuzuha (樟葉 楓子, Kuzuha Fūko)
Voiced by: Akeno Watanabe (Japanese); Carrie Savage (English)
Clumsy but selfless, Fūko Kuzuha is a student at Seitō Sannomiya. Despite being accident prone, mild-mannered, and easily flustered, Fūko is a very strong-willed girl. Much to her personal anxiety, she starts admiring Hibiki's personality, and this admiration develops into a powerful romantic attraction, bringing her considerable confusion and feelings of shame. Her mother died when she was six years old and her widower father is a traveling businessman. Fūko resides at the school dormitories. She also speaks up for Hibiki in the final episode, changing everyone's negative opinion of him when Hibiki's true gender is exposed.

=== Secondary characters ===
Kōji Mori (森 小路, Mori Kōji)
Voiced by: Katashi Ishizuka (Japanese); Taliesin Jaffe (English)
A salaryman who is a tenant at the Gochisō apartments; room 101. He is a pervert with a fascination with photographing female uniforms with his camera and unusually large mirror; frequently strapped on his back. He is good friends with Tofu Tofukuji.
Tōfū "Kochi" Tōfukuji (東福寺 東風, Tōfukuji Tōfū)
Voiced by: Yūji Ueda (Japanese); William Frederick Knight (English)
A retired, elderly man lodging at the Gochisō apartments.
Kura Ge (クラ・ゲ)
Voiced by: Mae Yoshida
Hibiki's pet dog. Lulu often uses Kura Ge as motivational collateral for the unpaid rent. While the breed of Kura Ge is never mentioned, he seems to resemble a Bichon.
Chieko Sannomiya (三ノ宮 千恵子, Sannomiya Chieko)
Voiced by: Rika Taniguchi (Japanese); Noelle DePaula (English)
The eponymous principal of Seitō Sannomiya. She was appointed office a decade prior to the story and carries herself in a conceited, yet formal, aristocratic manner. At the conclusion of the series, it is revealed that her sexism behavior was stemmed from a man who abandoned her in her younger years, who was the former gym teacher at the school; this reveals that she is an alumna of Seito Sannomiya.
Reiko Mukogawa (武庫川 玲子, Mukogawa Reiko)
Voiced by: Eriko Kawasaki (Japanese); Erica Shaffer (English)
Vice-principal of Seitō Sannomiya. She works closely with Chieko Sannomiya, and like her, is a stern man-hater, resulting from a failed marriage. Reiko grows suspicious of Hibiki early into his career and tries debunking his identity several times. Reiko was successful in exposing Hibiki's true gender in the end, but her plan in turning Seitō into an all-girls school was tarnished by Fūko's defensive speech for Hibiki.
Fujio Himejima (姫島 藤緒, Himejima Fujio)
Voiced by: Mikako Takahashi (Japanese); Stephanie Sheh (English)
An aggressive tomboy, Fujio Himejima is a student at Seitō Sannomiya. She wears her hair in two loose pigtails, tied by her signature green bows. She has a black belt in Aikido and develops a crush on fellow student Akira Fukae, who unfortunately does not reciprocate. Fujio resides in the dormitories.
Miho Umeda (梅田 美保, Umeda Miho)
Voiced by: Omi Minami (Japanese); Suzy Harbulak (English)
Miho Umeda is a student at the school and is Fujio's closest friend. Her maturity is considerably more developed than her friends and this at times makes her behave in an arrogant manner; especially when it comes to her past and current experiences with boys. As a result, the other girls tend to look up to her and this prompts her to act like a role model for them. Miho resides in the dormitories. She is a foil to Seiko Kasuganomichi.
Seiko Kasuganomichi (春日野道 聖子, Kasuganomichi Seiko)
Voiced by: Fumiko Orikasa (Japanese); Sienna Canyon (English)
Seiko Kasuganomichi is a fairly quiet student. Her family is wealthy and she is often seen sheltered. She gets uncomfortable at the sight of naked men, in photographs or in the flesh.
Akira Fukae (深江 晃, Fukae Akira)
Voiced by: Yūji Ueda (Japanese); Ted Sroka (English)
Quiet and composed, Akira Fukae is one of the primary male students on campus. Even though he usually tends to be level-headed, Akira is not afraid to speak his mind or take a stand for what he believes he is fair and just. His father is a private investigator.
Kyōsuke Aoki (青木 恭佑, Aoki Kyōsuke)
Voiced by: Takayuki Yamaguchi (Japanese); Josh Phillips (English)
Kyosuke Aoki is another one of the few male students at the school, arguably the most energetic and is also the tallest; comparable to Miho Umeda to the girls. He takes the biggest interest in Hibiki's drag and frequently proclaims it to her and the others. Kyosuke is good friends with Akira Fukae and Shoichi.
Shōichi Iwaya (岩屋 祥一, Iwaya Shōichi)
Voiced by: U-ko Tachibana (Japanese); Jaime Gallardo (English)
Another enrolled male student at the school and a close friend of Kyōsuke Aoki.
Yachio Tokugawa (徳川 八千男, Tokugawa Yachio)
Voiced by: Takeshi Watabe (Japanese); William Morgan Sheppard (English)
The board chairman of Seitō Sannomiya.
Shirō Naruo (鳴尾 志朗, Naruo Shirō)
Voiced by: Norihisa Mori (Japanese); Jonas Ball (English)
Another of the few male students. He is a gentle and quiet boy who appears in Episode 8. He stole Reiko Mukogawa's salary when he is asked by Hibiki to visit the teacher's lounge and retrieve his grade book. Shiro has a girlfriend named Makoto Uozaki.

== Episode list ==
The anime series is animated by TNK and directed by Yūji Yamaguchi. It first aired in Japan on Wowow between July 4 and September 26, 2001, running for 13 episodes. As of December 2007, the series is out of print.

Two pieces of theme music were used for the anime; one opening theme and one ending theme. The opening theme is "Dearest," a modified version of Shoko Sawada's "Shin'ai naru Hitoe," performed by Hitomi Mieno and arranged by Masara Nishida. The ending theme is "White Station" by Ace File composed of Mae Yoshikawa, Marina Kushi, Asagi Kudo, Saori Nara, with lyrics by Rei Yoshii, and arrangement by Masala Nishida. Other music was provided by Masala Nishida.

=== Episodes ===
No.	Title	Directed by	Written by	Original release date
1	"Desperate First Lipstick"; Transliteration: "Haisui no fāsuto rūju" (Japanese: 背水のファーストルージュ)	Hideki Okamoto	Yasuko Kobayashi	July 4, 2001
Hibiki Amawa moves into the Gochisō apartments, only to find out that rent is supposed to be paid in advance. Unable to meet the quota, he rushes to get a job at the nearby Seitō Sannomiya Private School to apply for a position. He is rejected employment because of his sex, so with the help of his landlady Lulu Sanjō, Hibiki disguises himself as a woman to get the job.
2	"Forbidden Narrow Eyeliner"; Transliteration: "Kindan no girigiri airain" (Japanese: 禁断のギリギリアイライン)	Takatsugu Kobayashi	Yasuko Kobayashi	July 11, 2001
A mysterious voyeur begins to frequently appear on the dormitory property so to keep the girls safe, Hibiki is instructed to temporarily live with them.
3	"Selfish Blush Magic"; Transliteration: "Migatte na chīku majikku" (Japanese: 身勝手なチークマジック)	Yoshitaka Fujimoto	Mutsumi Nakano	July 18, 2001
Dissatisfied with the long pleated skirts the girls wear during athletics class, Hibiki tries to introduce buruma as an alternative.
4	"Delicate Tear Concealer"; Transliteration: "Bimyō na tia konshīrā" (Japanese: 微妙なティアコンシーラー)	Shintarō Itoga	Yasuko Kobayashi	July 25, 2001
It is parents weekend and when it is Hibiki's turn, the parents are asked to join the class. But who will be there for Fūko? Mori and Tofu attempt to enter the school as parents.
5	"Wicked Dream Foundation"; Transliteration: "Yokoshima na dorīmu fande" (Japanese: 邪なドリームファンデ)	Megumi Yamamoto	Yasuko Kobayashi	August 1, 2001
The school schedules a physical examination of all students, and suspicious of Hibiki's identity, Vice-principal Reiko Mukogawa makes him take one too.
6	"Fragile Powder Puzzle"; Transliteration: "Garasu tachi no paudā pazuru" (Japanese: 硝子たちのパウダーパズル)	Ryō Miyata	Mutsumi Nakano	August 8, 2001
Hibiki is worried that he has become more of a woman since he is disguised as a woman. A fight starts between the children. But who started it? Meanwhile Tofu and Mori try to dig under the school.
7	"Longed For Complexion Toner"; Transliteration: "Akogare iro no feisu karā chūn" (Japanese: 憧れ色のフェイスカラーチューン)	Yasuhito Kikuchi	Hideki Shirane	August 22, 2001
The school's director wants Hibiki to marry his nephew. The students hear about this and decide to spy on his nephew. Can Hibiki stop this marriage in time?
8	"Rebellious Eyelash Curler Boys"; Transliteration: "Hangyaku no byūrā bōizu" (Japanese: 反逆のビューラーボーイズ)	Yasuhiro Minami	Yasuko Kobayashi	August 29, 2001
The male students become very unhappy when Shiro Naruo, a friend, is accused of stealing Reiko Mukogawa's salary. They rebel against the school and protest by threatening the safety of a priceless statute in exchange for equal rights.
9	"A Midsummer's Night Sexy Gloss"; Transliteration: "Manatsu no yoru no sekushī gurosu" (Japanese: 真夏の夜のセクシーグロス)	Hideki Okamoto	Mutsumi Nakano	September 5, 2001
Hibiki's class goes on a camping trip where affections blossom between students, including Hibiki, who has an admirer himself.
10	"Bemusing Love Palette"; Transliteration: "Konwaku no rabu paretto" (Japanese: 困惑のラブパレット)	Shintarō Itoga	Hideki Shirane	September 12, 2001
Fujio Himejima tries to confess her feelings to Akira Fukae with the help of Miho Umeda, but things do not go as planned.
11	"Fragrance Heart to Adulthood"; Transliteration: "Otona e no fureguransu hāto" (Japanese: 大人へのフレグランスハート)	Ryō Miyata	Yasuko Kobayashi	September 19, 2001
Still affected about the events of yesterday Fūko feels confused and worried about her feelings and goes missing from school. This prompts everyone to search for her.
12	"Cleansing Shock of Deception"; Transliteration: "Itsuwari no kurenjingu shokku" (Japanese: 偽りのクレンジングショック)	Takatsugu Kobayashi	Yasuko Kobayashi	September 25, 2001
When Hibiki is taken to a hospital to recover from burns the day before, Fūko and Akira visit him. Reiko Mukogawa visits too, hoping to photograph Hibiki out of drag.
13	"Someday, Without Make-up As Promised"; Transliteration: "Itsuka yakusoku no nō meiku" (Japanese: いつか約束のノーメイク)	Megumi Yamamoto	Yasuko Kobayashi	September 26, 2001
Reiko Mukogawa exposes Hibiki's identity with photographs from her visit to the hospital. With this evidence she calls upon the parents and students of the school to promote its change to an all-girls institution. Fūko takes a stand against this and rushes after Hibiki, who is shamefully departing from the city. The finale hinted that Akira is starting to accept Fujio as a friend, besides Hibiki promising that he will return for Fūko.

== Adaptations ==
=== Manga ===
A manga adaptation illustrated by the anime's character designer Maki Fujii was serialized in MediaWorks' Dengeki Daioh magazine between December 21, 2001, and February 25, 2002. A total of 3 chapters have been published.
