= Seraphim Call =

Japanese anime television series

- Seraphim Call characters.
- セラフィムコール
- Genre: Slice of life, Yuri
- Based on: Dengeki G's Magazine by MediaWorks
- Director: Tomomi Mochizuki
- Series composition: Naruhisa Arakawa
- Character designer: Aoi Nanase
- Music: Akifumi Tada
- Country of origin: Japan
- Original language: Japanese
- No. of episodes: 12

Production
- Producers: Furuse Kazuya; Yoshito Akazaki
- Production companies: Sunrise

Original release
- Network: TV Tokyo
- Release: October 6 – December 22, 1999

Seraphim Call (セラフィムコール, Serafimu Kōru) is a Japanese anime series by Sunrise from 1999. Seraphim Call may be considered avant-garde in several respects. For example: it is an anthology of individual stories while most other anime is serialized. Other examples include a surprise ending that comes at the beginning of one of the stories, an episode seen entirely through the eyes of a plush toy, one is largely a Thunderbirds parody, and two nearly identical episodes from individual twin perspectives. The experimentation in plot structure can be very subtle, often requiring the viewer to watch each episode twice before noticing it.

== Plot ==
Each story takes place in the year 2010, in a futuristic city named Neo-Acropolis on an artificial island in Japan. Among the city's residents are 11 girls, each facing a different dilemma.

== Characters ==
Yukina Kurimoto (栗本 雪菜, Kurimoto Yukina)
Voiced by: Hiroko Kasahara
Yukina is a high-school girl who possesses a high level of skill in science and engineering. She also has androphobia, and travels around in a giant robot in order to avoid being around men.
Tanpopo Teramoto (寺本 たんぽぽ, Teramoto Tanpopo)
Voiced by: Taeko Kawata
Despite her age, Tanpopo still enjoys picture books, stuffed toys and colouring. She always wears a bright (usually orange) hair ribbon.
Chinami Ouse (桜瀬 ちなみ, Ōse Chinami)
Voiced by: Akiko Yajima
Chinami lives with her divorced father and two young siblings, and spends most of her time doing housework. She enjoys baking sweets, and has a wish to study pastry-making in Paris.
Hatsumi Kusunoki (楠 初摘, Kusunoki Hatsumi)
Voiced by: Emiko Ito
Hatsumi has been an athletic tomboy all her life and has no desire to be feminine; she believes that if she is not feminine, she cannot be beautiful, either. However, after she is chosen to model for a painting, her outlook begins to change.
Shion Murasame (村雨 紫苑, Murasame Shion)
Voiced by: Miki Nagasawa
Out of the Murasame family's twin daughters, Shion is the one intended to inherit her father's company. Her personality is methodical, sharp, and cold, but she has a very strong bond with Sakura.
Sakura Murasame (村雨 桜, Murasame Sakura)
Voiced by: Chinami Nishimura
Sakura, the younger of the Murasame twins, will apparently inherit her mother's company when she comes of age. She is quiet and tries to watch over Shion.
Saeno Hiiragi (柊 彩乃, Hīragi Saeno)
Voiced by: Kyoko Tsuruno
Saeno has a deep love for mathematics of all types, but chose to become an English teacher, as she thinks of math as being something precious that she cannot teach to someone who does not love it.
Ayaka Rindoh (凛堂 あやか, Rindō Ayaka)
Voiced by: Rei Sakuma
Ayaka is the kind-hearted daughter of a fabulously wealthy man, but she spends his fortune too frivolously (often without making it clear how much the items cost beforehand) and dreams of protecting world peace.
Kasumi Kurenai (紅 かすみ, Kurenai Kasumi)
Voiced by: Yu Asakawa
Kasumi is practical and rarely speaks. She is unimpressed that her actions at a park fountain have transformed into a ritual for good luck amongst young girls, and actually finds it irritating that people all over the city are attributing completely unrelated messages and ideas to her. She works on a camera crew for a news station, and likes to ride her motorcycle.
Kurumi Matsumoto (松本 くるみ, Matsumoto Kurumi)
Voiced by: Ayako Kawasumi
Using the pen name Subaru Kurumigawa, shy high-schooler Kurumi has secretly become the author of a manga that is so popular it has been made into an anime. She works hard on her manga, to the point of falling asleep on the drawing table, but keeps her identity secret from those who know her in real life. Due to the masculine nature of Kurumi's pen name, most of her audience assumes that she is male (including Tanpopo, who later concludes that Kurumi is a homosexual man).
Urara Tachibana (橘 うらら, Tachibana Urara)
Voiced by: Maria Yamamoto
Urara is the daughter of the late architect who designed Neo-Acropolis. She describes herself as "quiet and indecisive", and loves both nature and architecture (particularly that of the city her father built). Since the death of her father, Urara has been the caretaker of her sick mother.

== Episodes ==
No.	Title	Original release date
1	"Yukina Kurimoto ~Sleeping Beauty Panic!~" "Kurimoto Yukina ~Nemurihime Panikku!~" (栗本雪菜 KURIMOTO YUKINA 〜眠り姫ぱにっく!〜)	October 6, 1999
The police summon Yukina Kurimoto to defuse a bomb in Neo-Acropolis city, but her acute androphobia hinders her. The episode has a fake ending right before the first commercial break.
2	"Tanpopo Teramoto ~Margarine Crisis~" "Teramoto Tanpopo ~Māgarin Kikippatsu~" (寺本たんぽぽ TERAMOTO TANPOPO 〜マーガリン危機一髪〜)	October 13, 1999
Unlike all her friends, Tanpopo Teramoto continues to believe in fairy-tales and talking stuffed animals; however, one of Tanpopo's friends is losing patience with her. The episode is shown entirely from the point of view of one of her stuffed toys; at the end it's revealed that the toy has hidden cameras in its eyes.
3	"Chinami Ōse ~The Taste of Cake~" "Ōse Chinami ~Yōgashi no Aji~" (桜瀬ちなみ OHSE CHINAMI 〜洋菓子の味〜)	October 23, 1999
When Chinami Ōse's divorced mother announces that she is marrying another man, Chinami challenges the suitor to a cooking contest, with the condition that her mother will not get remarried if Chinami wins.
4	"Hatsumi Kusunoki ~The Flying Angel~" "Kusunoki Hatsumi ~Hishō suru Tenshi~" (楠 初摘 KUSUNOKI HATSUMI 〜飛翔する天使〜)	October 27, 1999
Hatsumi Kusunoki does not think that she could be pretty or feminine, but an artist named Miyabi attempts to show her otherwise by using her as a model for a painting.
5	"Shion Murasame ~To My Sister in My Dreams~" "Murasame Shion ~Yume no Naka no Imōto e~" (村雨紫苑 MURASAME SHION 〜夢の中の妹へ〜)	November 3, 1999
Twin sisters Shion and Sakura Murasame receive a love letter, but a cigarette burn on the envelope conceals part of the recipient's name. Shion begins using a virtual reality device to "become" Sakura, asking herself questions about the letter that seemed to trouble her.
6	"Sakura Murasame ~To My Sister Inside Love~" "Murasame Sakura ~Ai no Naka no Ane e~" (村雨 桜 MURASAME SAKURA 〜愛の中の姉へ〜)	November 10, 1999
The previous episode is shown from Sakura's point of view. Sakura possesses a machine that allows her to control her dreams, which she uses in a manner similar to Shion's virtual reality device.
7	"Saeno Hīragi ~The Paradox that is Me~" "Hīragi Saeno ~"Watashi" to iu Gyakusetsu~" (柊 彩乃 HIIRAGI SAENO 〜<私>という逆説〜)	November 17, 1999
Saeno Hīragi, an English teacher, receives a book containing part of the value of pi from her deceased mathematics professor. After returning to the university at which he had taught, she goes backward in time and gives the book to herself as a child.
8	"Ayaka Rindō ~Acropolis International Rescue Team~" "Rindō Ayaka ~Akuroporisu Gokusai Kyūjotai~" (凛堂あやか RINDOH AYAKA 〜アクロポリス国際救助隊〜)	November 24, 1999
At her father's instructions, Ayaka Rindō gets a job at a restaurant, only to neglect the job in favour of stopping jewel thieves.
9	"Kasumi Kurenai ~The Legend of a Girl~" "Kurenai Kasumi ~Aru Shōjo no Densetsu" (紅かすみ KURENAI KASUMI 〜ある少女の伝説〜)	December 1, 1999
After a mysterious woman known as Kasumi Kurenai becomes famous in Neo-Acropolis, a news team begins conducting interviews in order to find out more about Kasumi, not realising that she is, in fact, one of their crew members.
10	"Kurumi Matsumoto ~Real Blue~" "Matsumoto Kurumi ~Riaru Burū~" (松本くるみ MATSUMOTO KURUMI 〜リアル·ブルー〜)	December 8, 1999
High school student Kurumi Matsumoto works as a popular manga artist under a pen name. One day, her parents temporarily adopt the son of a friend, resulting in a situation similar to Kurumi's manga. However, her reality ends up quite different from the story she had written.
11	"Urara Tachibana ~The Inner World of Me~" "Tachibana Urara ~Uchinaru Sekai no Watashi~" (橘うらら TACHIBANA URARA 〜内なる世界の私〜)	December 15, 1999
No characters besides Urara Tachibana (and her silhouetted father) are seen or heard in this episode. Urara struggles to deal with an assortment of problems, such as her mother's failing health and a confession of love from her childhood friend.
12	"~Sacred Night of the Seraphim~" "~Serafimutachi no Seiya~" (〜セラフィムたちの聖夜〜)	December 22, 1999
The characters meet one by one and discuss the events that followed their respective episodes.

== Ending themes ==
Each episode has a different ending theme performed by the voice actress of the main character. The closing theme to the final episode is "I miss you" written and performed by "ancy".

Episode	Character	Voice actress	Song title
1	Yukina Kurimoto	Hiroko Kasahara	"Yume mite mo ii ja nai"
2	Tanpopo Teramoto	Taeko Kawada	"Baby Pink na Asa"
3	Chinami Ōse	Akiko Yajima	"Sorekara..."
4	Hatsumi Kusunoki	Emiko Ito	"Viva! Onnanoko Domei"
5	Shion Murasame	Miki Nagasawa	"Now Is The Time"
6	Sakura Murasame	Chinami Nishimura	"50% no Balance"
7	Saeno Hīragi	Kyoko Tsuruno	"Return to Myself"
8	Ayaka Rindō	Rei Sakuma	"Surprise wa yamerarenai"
9	Kasumi Kurenai	Yu Asakawa	"Endless Tomorrow"
10	Kurumi Matsumoto	Ayako Kawasumi	"Album"
11	Urara Tachibana	Maria Yamamoto	"Yes, it's my true love"
