= Chance Pop Session =

Anime television series

- Chance: Triangle Session (a.k.a. Chance Pop Session)
- DVD cover featuring the three main characters, Akari, Yuki, and Nozomi.

チャンス〜トライアングルセッション〜 (Chance ~Triangle Session~)
- Genre: Drama, Music, Romance
- Anime television series
- Directed by: Susumu Kudo
- Produced by: Shinichi Kobayashi
- Music by: Gorō Matsui; Shinobou Tsuneki; Sueaki Harada
- Studio: Madhouse (Note: Animation production assistance (アニメーション制作協力) for all episodes provided by Studio Matrix.)
- Original network: TV Tokyo
- Original run: 21 May 2001 – 27 August 2001
- Episodes: 13
- icon

Chance: Triangle Session (チャンス〜トライアングルセッション〜, Chansu ~Toraianguru Sesshon~), also known as Chance: Pop Session, is a 2001 anime produced by Madhouse. The series aired from May 21 to August 27, 2001, and ran for 13 episodes.

Three young girls—Akari, Yuki, and Nozomi—meet at a concert and set out to follow in the footsteps of their idol, Reika, and become music stars. They enroll in the prestigious music school that produced Reika and are placed in the "S class" due to their potential.

While Chance Pop Session could be characterized as a romantic comedy in the shōjo category, it does have some elements of tragedy.

This is one of the few anime that for which ADV Films was on the production committee during their time in the anime industry. In the US, they released three volumes of videos on VHS and DVD in 2003. They also released a complete series thinpak on DVD in 2007 and a regular DVD case in 2009. It is currently streaming on Crunchyroll and HIDIVE.

== Plot ==
Three girls—Akari, Yuki, and Nozomi—meet each other at the concert of their idol, Reika. Each speaks to one another briefly, then goes their separate ways. They all love to sing, and when they each find admission forms for a music school overseen by Reika's manager, they do not hesitate to sign up. Reika's manager, Akiba Kisaragi, meanwhile, has decided to create a special class, the S Class, within the school for any singers who catch her eye.

Akari and Nozomi have no trouble signing up, and once there are nearly immediately accepted into the S Class, along with Jun Morimura. Akari and Nozomi recognize each other quickly and soon become close friends, but Jun keeps an aloof and superior attitude and students who were not selected for the S Class soon grow jealous. Yuki's hard-earned entrance money is stolen, and she joins a band of street musicians as a vocalist, soon becoming popular on the streets and online.

== Characters ==
- Akari Mizushima (水島アカリ, Mizushima Akari)

Akari is one of the four members of Class S in the Chance Pop Session anime. She began her singing career as a member of church choir and she is the eldest of the three sisters. The "Mizu" in her name means water in English, which becomes significant later. She is voiced by Mayumi Iizuka in the Japanese and Kelli Cousins in the English dub.

- Yuki Aoyama (青山ユウキ, Aoyama Yūki)

Yuki is one of the four members of Class S in the Chance Pop Session anime and the middle sister of the trio. Her music career started as a street performer who was gaining a fan following before being recruited for Class S. The "Ao" in her name means blue in English, which becomes significant later. She is voiced by Atsuko Enomoto in the Japanese and Hilary Haag in the English dub.

- Nozomi Kaibara (柏原ノゾミ, Kaibara Nozomi)

Nozomi is one of the four members of Class S and the youngest sister in the Chance Pop Session anime. She began her singing career as a wealthy fan of Reika who wanted to attend the same school as she did. The "Kai" in her name means "ocean" in English, which becomes significant later. She is voiced by Maria Yamamoto in the Japanese and Monica Rial in the English dub.

- Jun Morimura (森村ジュン, Morimura Jun)

Jun is a member of Class S in the Chance Pop Session anime. She believes that music and performing is all about competition and separates herself from the girls of R3, deciding to be a solo artist instead. She is voiced by Kana Ueda in the Japanese and Tiffany Grant in the English dub.

- Reika (レイカ)

Reika was adopted by Kisaragi Akaba when she was around 10 years old. She had been abused by her show business mother, blaming Reika herself for being abused. When Kisaragi found her, they were both in need of each other. Kisaragi had lost many people close to her and was in a deep depression, whereas Reika needed a mother and Kisaragi's music helped her through her hard times. Once adopted by Kisaragi, Reika started singing and in no time she was a star like her adopted mother. When Kisaragi started her S-class and started looking for the next singing sensation though, Reika found herself a bit jealous. She is voiced by Mariko Kouda in the Japanese and Shelley Calene-Black in the English dub.

- Kisaragi Akiba (秋葉キサラギ, Akiba Kisaragi)

Kisaragi was a music superstar in her youth before becoming a singing coach. After being tragically separated from her three daughters, she adopted Reika and became her mentor. After deciding that Reika has learned all that she can from her, Kisaragi opens a music school and picks the best students for a special "Class S". She is voiced by Yuu Daiki in the Japanese and Christine Auten in the English dub.

- Kaito Kosaka (者振快人, Kosaka Kaito)

Kaito is Akari's best friend and love interest. He encourages her to follow her dream of being a singer, and says he will race her to his own goal of becoming a teacher. He dies saving a child from being hit by a truck and becomes Akari's guardian angel. He is voiced by Takehito Koyasu in the Japanese and David Matranga in the English dub.

== Episode list ==
Note: Summaries shown are taken from HIDIVE's stream.

Episodes	Title	Summary
1	Angel	Three girls from all different walks of life are brought together by their shared love for Reika's music.
2	"Destiny"	Akari, Yuki, and Nozomi do their best to get accepted into Akiba Music School, Father Samuel expresses his concerns about Akari.
3	"Class S"	Yuki decides to join a street band. Meanwhile, Akari struggles with her nerves as Kisaragi starts observing classes, in search for students to join her S Class.
4	"Fortissimo"	S Class must face new hardships as they prepare for their debut. Yuki starts to make a name for herself with her newfound band.
5	"Love Song"	Feeling refreshed, Akari talks to the S Class about much needed improvements. A new student joins the S Class. Could this mean trouble for the other girls?
6	"Memory"	Akari is trying to put together the pieces of her past as she encounters a similar blue stone. Samuel then reveals her past to her.
7	"Resonance"	Akari makes her fateful return to the S Class, but she still feels isolated and alone. Yuki comes up with a plan to cheer everyone up.
8	"Audition"	The trio prepares for the M & K Records' Rookie Audition. The girls quickly realize that Jun is no longer their only rival.
9	"Blindly"	After the results have been announced, the trio now prepares for their next challenge. But does one of them push herself too far?
10	"Advance"	R3's first TV performance brings about the pressure of their debut. Meanwhile, Reika is haunted by memories of the past
11	"Past"	Kisaragi has an exclusive interview, during which memories of her past and youth flash through her mind.
12	"Beginning"	Even as rookies, R3 is destined for greatness as they are nominated for a Music Police Award, but is the publicity too much for the girls to handle?
13	"Angels"	The day of the Music Police Awards has finally arrived. R3 must compete against their longtime idol Reika in their rise to fame.
