= Ikuo =

- Gender: Male

Origin
- Origin: Japanese
- Meaning: Different meanings depending on the kanji used

Ikuo (written: 郁夫, 育夫, 征夫 or 幾雄) is a masculine Japanese given name. Notable people with the name include:

- Ikuo Hayashi (林 郁夫; born 1947), member of Aum Shinrikyo
- Ikuo Hirayama (平山 郁夫; 1930–2009), Japanese painter
- Ikuo Kabashima (蒲島 郁夫; born 1947), Japanese politician
- Ikuo Kamei (亀井 郁夫; born 1933), Japanese politician
- Ikuo Kushiro (久城 育夫; born 1934), Japanese petrologist
- Ikuo Matsumoto (松本 育夫; born 1941), Japanese footballer and manager
- Ikuo Nakamura (中村 征夫; born 1945), Japanese photographer
- Ikuo Nishikawa (西川 幾雄; born 1940), Japanese voice actor
- Ikuo Oyama (大山 郁夫; 1880–1955), Japanese academic, politician, political scientist and writer
- Ikuo Sekimoto (関本 郁夫; born 1942), Japanese film director and screenwriter
- Ikuo Shirahama (白浜 育男; born 1958), Japanese golfer
- Ikuo Takahara (高原 郁夫; born 1957), Japanese footballer
- Ikuo Towhata (東畑 郁生), Japanese academic
- Ikuo Yamahana (山花 郁夫; born 1967), Japanese politician
