= The Severing Crime Edge =

Japanese manga series

- Cover of the first manga volume (Kindle edition)

断裁分離のクライムエッジ (Dansai Bunri no Kuraimu Ejji)
- Genre: Action, Fantasy, Romance
- Manga
- Written by: Tatsuhiko Hikagi
- Published by: Media Factory
- Magazine: Monthly Comic Alive
- Original run: March 27, 2009 – September 2015
- Volumes: 11
- Anime television series
- Directed by: Yūji Yamaguchi
- Written by: Tatsuhiko Urahata
- Music by: Yasuharu Takanashi
- Studio: Studio Gokumi
- Licensed by: NA: Sentai Filmworks
- Original network: Tokyo MX, Sun TV, KBS, TV Aichi, AT-X
- Original run: April 4, 2013 – June 27, 2013
- Episodes: 13

The Severing Crime Edge (Japanese: 断裁分離のクライムエッジ, Hepburn: Dansai Bunri no Kuraimu Ejji) is a Japanese manga series, written and illustrated by Tatsuhiko Hikagi. KADOKAWA began releasing the digital English volumes on BookWalker on December 10, 2014. An anime television series adaptation by Studio Gokumi premiered on Tokyo MX and other networks on April 4, 2013.

== Plot ==
Kiri Haimura is a seemingly ordinary boy with one slight problem: he is obsessed with cutting other people's hair. One day, he meets Iwai Mushanokōji, the "Hair Queen" (髪の女王, Kami no Joō) who cannot cut her hair because of an inherited curse. Kiri finds out that his scissors, "The Severing Crime Edge" is the only thing that can cut them. The scissors were a killing tool that belonged to his ancestor, Norma Grayland, the most infamous serial killer in history. But little did Kiri know that his meeting with Iwai sparked the start of an old murder game to kill the "Hair Queen" using the cursed killing tools, the "Killing Goods" (殺害遺品, Kiringu Guzzu). It is said whoever assassinates the Hair Queen will have a wish granted. Can Kiri protect Iwai from the Killing Goods Owners, known as 'Authors', associates of the illegitimate Gossip organization? Let the game begin!

== Characters ==
Kiri Haimura (灰村 切, Haimura Kiri)
Voiced by: Natsuki Hanae
Kiri is the current owner and Author of the Killing Good, "The Cutting and Severing Crime Edge", a pair of scissors. Subsequently, he is usually annoyed by his neighborhood since childhood because of his habit of cutting hair. His scissors, which can cut through human flesh, belonged to his ancestor, the infamous serial killer known as Norma Grayland (ノーマ・グレイランド, 'Nōma Gureirando), who, in the 1860s fled from Europe to Japan and claimed to have killed 200 people with them. After Kiri meets Iwai by accident, he becomes fascinated with her beautiful hair, becoming friends with her after realizing that her hair can only be cut by his scissors. Upon learning that Iwai is targeted by other Authors, he vows to protect her, making use of the enhanced reflexes he gains when fighting with his scissors. Iwai acts as an "Instead" to Kiri, with the act of cutting her hair every day relieving him from the homicidal tendencies that usually befall an Author when possessed by a Killing Good. Should Iwai die, the loss of his Instead would eventually have him overcome with this desire, turning him into a murderer. He later unlocks the true power of the "Crime Edge", using the ability of pain augmentation, causing excruciating pain on whoever he hurts with them, creating hallucinations of their body being severed. Kiri contracts Grayland for self-control power and follows Zewulfa's delusion to collect hair to lift the curse and rescue Iwai. Zewulfa's manifestation summons a guillotine and all past Author against Violet and Iwai, however, Kiri gathers the courage to use his non-killing tool to execute Zewulfa, marking her Kiri's first and last victim. With the curse gone, the Crime Edge is put away as a memento of Kiri and Iwai's curse adventures.

The truth is Grayland received the scissors from a blacksmith who later suffered an unknown plague. Grayland desperately search a cure for the pandemic in every village claiming himself amateur doctor. However, the villagers soon suspected Grayland and caught him dissecting flesh corpses for autopsies, considered an act of vandalism and cast him away. Regardless of the mistrust, Grayland continued his research carrying the scissors, his only tool, which eventually driven him irate cursing the scissors, labeling him the most notorious murderer. His remaining colleagues developed the remedy for the disease that was unveil a type of moss and created modern antibiotics.

Iwai Mushanokouji (武者小路 祝, Mushanokōji Iwai)
Voiced by: Kotori Koiwai
The main heroine and the current "Hair Queen". With a long black hair that goes down all the way to her feet that can't be cut or damaged with ordinary tools, she is a reclusive person unable to leave her home until meeting Kiri. Thanks to Kiri being able to cut her hair, she finally manages to go to school and talk normally with others. However, every day at midnight, her hair grows back to the original size, thus Kiri must cut it every day, which is not a nuisance to him at all as he never gets bored of doing it. Iwai is very kind to where she's willingly forgive those that harmed her. According to legend, Zewulfa (髪の女王, Zablefahr), the original Hair Queen, left a curse to her descendants - including Iwai - which gives them uncuttable hair, and she is the origin of the Killing Goods. It is said that as the Hair Queen, she can only be harmed with Killing Goods, explaining why Iwai's hair can be cut with the "Crime Edge" and whoever manages to kill her can have a wish granted, even if it means destroying the world's natural laws, thus she is usually targeted by other Authors. Iwai and Kiri develop a romantic relationship, and become a couple.

As Violet rubs a saint coin that awakens Zewulfa's spirit in Iwai's body; she obliges to her guilt of injustice. Long ago, Zewulfa unintentionally defiled a fortuneteller's beauty hair (Violet's ancestor) becoming obsessed in gaining knowledge and status through the work of mercenaries and assassins; creating the rules of using other people "Insteads" to relief the pity of losing loved ones, and cursing the Queen's descendants in a cycle of wish-granting out of death. However, Kiri exposes Zewulfa had been deceiving Iwai, and Zewulfa was really a malicious Queen who took extreme pride of her silky black hair, going to lengths in stealing other corpses' black hair, refusing to share to anybody even her own descendants. In the last chapters, Iwai did serious thinking on how to rid the remnants of Zewulfa in her dreams due not wanting lose her uncuttable hair afraid that Kiri might leave her. Reaching the decision, Kiri lends Iwai his Crime Edge and slices Zewulfa for good. Living with normal hair, Kiri keeps his vow to stay by Iwai's side forever and kisses her.

Yamane Byouinzaka (病院坂 病子, Byōinzaka Yamane)
Voiced by: Kaori Fukuhara
The younger sister of Houko Byouinzaka and Author of the Killing Good called "The Injection of Eternal Sleep" a syringe that can kill people either by being injected or being nicked. The original owner of her Killing Good was a medical professional, Florence Nightingale, who is known to have infected people with her poisonous vaccinations. Yamane goes to the same school and class as Kiri. She's often very unpredictable and constantly on edge when her lust for blood is not satisfied, which is why she is very much dependant on Houko. Yamane's first victims were her parents, a crime for which Houko took the blame so as to keep Yamane from being incriminated. Yamane gradually warms up to her classmates thanks to Iwai's efforts. Afraid of Houko abandoning her if the curse was lifted, Houko confirms her unwavering support for Yamane.

Houko Byouinzaka (病院坂 法子, Byōinzaka Hōko)
Voiced by: Yumi Uchiyama
The elder sister of Yamane Byouinzaka and the professor's assistant, she's initially cold and heartless towards Iwai, but eventually treats her kindly. Houko allowed herself to be Yamane's "Instead" as a way to relieve her from the blood lust due to the pressure of Killing Goods that she possesses by allowing Yamane to inject her with a saline solution as a way to act out the latter's murderous intent. It is hinted that she has gotten so used to it, that she develops a kind of masochistic arousal. After the custom-made Authors' defeat, Houko now shares Nightingale with Yamane. Yamane implies Houko secretly has feelings for Kanae.

Kanae Sumeragi (皇 鼎, Sumeragi Kanae)
Voiced by: Kōji Yusa
He is a college professor that observes the Gossip organization, and is Iwai's legal guardian. He is also the Byouinzaka sisters' foster parent, mainly out of self-interest. Houko describes him a Lolicon. Kanae mutters that Kiri will suffer a fate similar to his past. Revealing Kanae once had a girl in his childhood stumble upon a dress "the Cocktail Dress of Gorgeous Seduction" originally owned by an aristocratic woman who after dancing with men out of self-interest and later kidnaps to "saddle" them in overwhelming seduction till their hearts passes out, and she developed the urge to intercourse Kanae every night as an "Instead", until by early teens he resisted her for saying unpleasant things then the girl committed suicide. Since then, Kanae reflected his guilt and observe children for their safety.

Emily Redhands (エミリー・レッドハンズ, Emirī Reddohanzu)
Voiced by: Rina Hidaka
A professional foreign killer and the adopted daughter of Iwai's father, making her Iwai's little sister. Her Killing Goods is "The Opener of Bloody Dissection", a collections of knives that inflicts the wounded victims with endless bleeding unless treated with a special cure. Originally made into a Killing Goods owner by Iwai's father so that Iwai's hair can be cut. Following his death, Emily's intention changed to killing Iwai so she could wish for her father's revival, mostly out of jealousy of Iwai. However, after experiencing excruciating pain and defeat from Kiri's Crime Edge, she bonds with Iwai. Emily appears to be acquaintances with Violet until she learns her ordeals. Emily is revealed to be rather excited in sexual affairs. She is one of the only three successful "custom-made" Killing Goods owners: Owners who are not descendants of the original users of the Killing Goods they own.

=== Schoolmates ===
Kashiko Misumi (美墨 かしこ, Misumi Kashiko)
Voiced by: Kiyono Yasuno
Kashiko's family runs a beauty salon and determines she should take over the family business eventually, but Kashiko aspires to be an attractive model instead. It seems she harbors romantic feelings for Kiri, even letting him cut her hair when Iwai isn't around. However, Kashiko comes to realization that Kiri cannot love her as much as Iwai. Asking her to gradually let him cut her hair to restore the rusty Crime Edge, since it can only be done from someone who takes pride in her hair.

Kotarō Naruto (鳴門 小太郎, Naruto Kotarō)
Voiced by: Nobunaga Shimazaki
He's an ace member of the Iaido club, and a friend of Kiri.

Nigi Ubuzato (初郷 和, Ubuzato Nigi)
Voiced by: Arisa Noto
She enjoys horror stories, and seems to be fond of the Norma Grayland's history. She is neighbors and childhood friends with Kotarō and harbors feelings for him.

=== Authors and Insteads ===
Ruka Shihōdō (四方堂 瑠架, Shihōdō Ruka)
Voiced by: Yōko Hikasa
She is the vice president of the student council and is the owner of the Killing Good "Pet Whip of Submissive Butchery" a whip that manipulates people with a few slaps from it into submissive zombies. She despises popularity because people only see her attractive instead of her well-being. It said the whip belonged to her ancestor, Fujin Shihōdō, headmaster of the Kazoku, in the Meiji era, who used it for stealing other people's will and imprisoning them until they die of starvation. Ruka desires true domination; Romio whom she worshiped since childhood.

Romio Zaiga (雑賀 露見男, Zaiga Romio)
Voiced by: Yuichi Nakamura
He is the president of the student council and acts as an "Instead" for Ruka. Willing to endure the constant slaps of Ruka's whip that she inflicts on Romio. Since childhood he adores her as a princess, leaving many girls around jealous of Ruka for having Romio. He and Ruka are often charged with cases involving Gossip.

Seigi Nakajima (中嶋 正義, Nakajima Seigi)
Voiced by: Akira Ishida
He is the owner of the Killing Good "The Rulebook of Sentencing and Execution" and enjoys killing various other Authors who go after the Hair Queen. It said his book belonged to a judge, Garivaldi, who executed twenty people by his own hands. By reciting the various crimes of target, he can summon a rope and hang the target. If the target is not evil, or guilty enough of these crimes, then the rope shall snap leaving the target knocked out. Kozakura is always interfering with Seigi's perverted actions of justice. He is killed by Emily and Violet after intervening a Gossip party to execute Kiri.

Hitomi Karuko (軽子 瞳, Karuko Hitomi)
Voiced by: Kikuko Inoue
She is an employee at a particular food bar that Iwai's father usually went to. In the bar, Karuko owns a white piano which she plays it frequently but some customers can notice that she stops halfway, claiming it is to encourage more customers to come and listen. In reality, however, the real reason why she doesn't because her piano is actually the Killing Good "Pianissimo of Ecstatic Symphony", which kills people after listening to the final note. Due to her blindness, Karuko has Koizumi direct her walking. She and Koizumi don't wish to participate in the murder game.

Houichi Koizumi (小泉 芳一, Koizumi Hōichi)
Voiced by: Takehito Koyasu
He is Karuko's co-worker and acts as a tuner to her piano. He serves as an "Instead" for Karuko thanks to his deafness, which is why her Killing Good leaves him unaffected. Kiri sees Koizumi and Karuko's relationship similar to him and Iwai.

Keiichirou Jin (神 敬一郎, Jin Keiichirō)
An optimistic Author who works as an aid for Violet. He is one of the only three successful "custom-made" Killing Goods owners. His Killing Good is "The Rapidshot of Pinpoint Penetration" a rifle that fires endless long range bullets with instant hits thoroughly. His hobby is stuffed animal collecting, and is sensitive to pain. He is defeated by Kiri and arrested.

Fritz Maillold
A middle-aged Author who's involved with Gossip. He is one of the only three successful "custom-made" Killing Goods owners. He produces an irregular toxic incense "Cantarella of the Concealed Murder" that spreads rapidly than Yamane's Killing Good, but can resist it longer. His first attempt was to remove Kanae, and then Houko indicts Injection to fight back for her own responsibility (after a misconduct with Kanae) and lethal stabbed Fritz through the mouth to death.

Ewer Sullivan
Violet's personal attendant. She wields the "Clock of Instructional Admonition" a pocket watch that momentary shifts the timing of the body's biological activity, meaning minimal damages can deliberately resort to major ones, and the opposite also functional. The killing watch originally belonged to an abusive tutor. Ewer and Helen engage Emily and Yamane until Kiri interjects and consent a deal.

Helen Viniar
Violet's personal attendant. She wields "The Gauntlet of Pummeling Strikes" a pair of killing gloves that amplify the flow of blood circulation, including change the balance in the hormone allowing counter attacks skyrocket. Her original was a short-temper wealthy horse rider. Helen and Ewer both act as unfriendly Author and Instead team.

The Man with the Hammer
Voiced by: Daichi Endō
An unnamed Author who using "The Sledgehammer of Crushing Disintegration" a huge hammer that smashes walls and makes things brittle. He doesn't have an "Instead" to relieve him, so he's engulfed by the impulses of his killing tool and kills without a purpose. The man apparently broke out of his cell, and eventually reaches Iwai's house and battles Kiri. After Kiri defeats him, the man is hung by Seigi for his crimes.

=== Other characters ===
Lady Violet Witchy (ヴァイオレット・ウィッチー卿)
Voiced by: Yukari Tamura
The golden haired mistress of the Gossip organization. Has information on all "Killing Goods", and she might hold a personal grudge against the Hair Queen. She stole Kiri's first kiss. She had Iwai's father put to death, whose last words were begging Violet to spare Iwai till she finds a lover: Kiri. Violet is capable of unconditionally using all Killing Goods and purchasing tools imbedded with the effects for her own gear. Her only desire is Zewulfa herself. Violet's ancestor receive a saint coin from Zewulfa in a controversial game whether she should end Zewulfa's reign or leave the wish cycle for profit. During a final confrontation, Seigi's spirit rebukes that Violet and her family have always been cowards. Violet apologises to everyone remarking her aggressive actions was a certain way to resolve the curse and her devotion towards Iwai.

Kozakura Zenigata (銭形 小桜, Zenigata Kozakura)
Voiced by: Juri Nagatsuma
A female police officer, who is often in charge of cases involving Seigi since he judges other Authors before having them brought to court, and she used or fond of getting herself hanged by his Killing Good rope, or falling unconscious. She sort of acts as an "Instead" for him but claims he doesn't care. Upon Seigi's death, it is revealed that she loved him.

Hari Haimura (灰村 針, Haimura Hari)
Kiri's sister. She is hasty and stubborn. Kiri says that Hari was one of those who label him as a "creep" to their neighborhood because of his habit of cutting hair. During childhood, Hari liked Kiri for cutting her hair, but claims she now hates it. Iwai can tell she still enjoy having her hair cut, so she has Kiri set up a special salon for Hari. When Kiri's abnormal urge to kill takes effect and unable to resist cutting her hair, Hari becomes caught up in the situation and learns about the cursed Killing Goods. Despite being powerless, she wants to welcome her brother and Iwai home in any way she can.

== Media ==
=== Manga ===
No.	Release date	ISBN
1	November 21, 2009	978-4-8401-2945-9
1: The Sleeping Princess of the Forest; 2: Portrait of Heresy; 3: Isolation Inhibitor; 4: A Bell's Pitch; 5: To Escape the Storm; 6: Lights, Camera, Action!
2	August 23, 2010	978-4-8401-3364-7
7: Where's the Guest?; 8: Isolation Inhibitor "2"; 9: Before the Game; 10: Break & Through; 11: To Overcome the Corpses; 12: Hardcore Breakbeats
3	January 22, 2011	978-4-8401-3737-9
13: Strawberry Jam; 14: Waltz Under the Stars; 15: Heaven's Coins; 16: Fondling Wheel; 17: Party Chopper; 18: Lyrical Night Fright
4	August 23, 2011	978-4-8401-4028-7
19: Standing Ovation; 20: Red Rising; 21: Cooperation in Blood Donation; 22: The Forbidden Game; 23: Inhumane Glory; 24: Grayland Is In the House
5	February 23, 2012	978-4-8401-4417-9
25: Flowing Blood Relations; 26: Order-Made "2"; 27: The Downpour From the Heavens; 28: Air For Brains; 29: Tower Offense; 30: Like a Gift of Magi; 30.5: Something Akin to a Pajama Party
6	November 22, 2012	978-4-8401-4751-4
31: Poisonous Notebook; 32: Role Play; 33: Memories of the Heart; 34: Horizon of the Seeing Spirit; 35: Limer Game; 35.5: Wannabe Princess
7	March 23, 2013	978-4-8401-5025-5; ISBN 978-4-8401-4798-9 (SP)
36: Archmage; 37: Night Blade; 38: Wanderer; 39: Evil Shaman; 40: Star Lancer; 41: Zewulfa
8	March 22, 2014	978-4-04-066299-2
42: Witch of Flame; 43: Hip Hop Underground; 44: Tiny Conversation; 45: Power From Lies; 46: An Ill-Mannered Date; 47: Draw Your Graffiti; 47.5: Dilemma of a Dormouse
9	September 23, 2014	978-4-04-066849-9
48: You and Me, Tonight; 49: The Gray Cat and the Orange Mouse; 50: Mediator of the Dispute; 51: While Seeing an Illusion; 52: Criminal Verse; 52.5: Dirty Silence
10	March 23, 2015	978-4-04-067284-7
53: WHATCHANAME; 54: The Mad Queen; 55: The Grave Sinner; 56: The Gray Truth; 57: It's Not Over; 57.5: Hari's Day Off
11	September 19, 2015	978-4-04-067802-3
58: Hear the Resentment of the Dead; 59: The End of the World; 60: At the Very Bottom of One's Heart; 61: Last Battle; 62: We Are All Crime Edge

=== Anime ===
The anime television series adaptation is directed by Yūji Yamaguchi and produced by Studio Gokumi with music by Yasuharu Takanashi. It started airing on Tokyo MX on April 4, 2013. It was streamed by Crunchyroll with subtitles in English. Sentai Filmworks licensed the series for home video release in North America. The opening theme was "Unmei no Ori" (運命の檻) by Aimi Terakawa and the ending theme was "Kimi to Futari" (君と二人) by Yuri*Kari (Yurika Endō and Karin Takahashi).

No.	Title	Original release date
1	"―The Sleeping Princess―"; Transliteration: "―Nemureru Mori no Hime―" (Japanese: ―眠れる森の姫―)	April 4, 2013
The story of Kiri Haimura, a boy obsessed with cutting hair, heard of a rumor of a house up on a hill that dwells a ghost with long hair. Curious he decides to check it out for himself, and what he discovers is a girl with beautiful long hair. This girl's name is Iwai Mushanokōji, also known as the current "Hair Queen". They introduce themselves to each other which is when he learns that her hair can't be cut and also when the Byōinzaka sisters, Yamane and Houko, are introduced. Iwai tells Kiri about "Killing Goods" and Yamane and Hōko are murders, but doesn't fully believe it himself. The next day at Iwai's house, things starts to turn for the worse and Kiri begins to understand who Yamane and Houko really are and the existence of Killing Goods. After heading home, Kiri's grandpa reveals to him that their ancestors own a killing tool which has killed people. After researching about it he comes to the conclusion that his scissors are a Killing Good and so he heads to Iwai's house and explains this to her, and is able to cut her hair with them for the first time happily. Afterwards, Iwai and Kiri come up with a name for it, "The Severing Crime Edge".
2	"―The Portrait of Heresy―"; Transliteration: "―Itan no Shōzō―" (Japanese: ―異端の肖像―)	April 11, 2013
With her hair cut, Iwai finally has a chance to live a normal life. Yamane is really surprised and texts Houko about Iwai's hair, asking what she should do. Iwai enrolls into Kiri's classroom and is indeed nervous since she hasn't gone to school for a long time. The classmates get reactions seeing how Iwai resembles an elementary student; Kiri defends her hair from being touch by others. With class over, Yamane meets them and Iwai asks for her apologize, as Yamane accepted the kindness she talks about her ancestor, a medical personnel that could only kill peoples with her poison injections. Suddenly, she pulls out her Killing Good syringe "The Injection of Eternal Sleep" as her killing emotions begin to emerge and fights Kiri as he protects Iwai. In the morning, Kiri awakens and sees an inappropriate scene of Yamane injecting Houko as her "Instead" of calming her emotions. Then is introduced by Professor Kanae Sumeragi a member of the Gossip organization, Iwai opens the door with her hair grown fast. Kanae tells about the curse of Zewulfa, the original "Hair Queen", and "Killing Goods" owned by Authors. Revealing that whoever kills the Hair Queen with the Killing Goods a wish will be granted. Following the many fears they have to face, Kiri realize that he must protect Iwai with Crime Edge since she is his Instead too.
3	"—Cross the Thunder Clouds—"; Transliteration: "—Raiun wo Watare—" (Japanese: ―雷雲をわたれ―)	April 18, 2013
An Author with a huge hammer "The Sledgehammer of Crushing Disintegration" made it to town wrecking through building, and even though the Professor says there is nothing to worry about, Kiri doesn't agree and fears the worst. Today they are invited to Kashiko Misumi's salon house; Iwai admires Kashiko being attractive since she works to be a model. Kiri and Iwai witness a crime scene caused by the Sledgehammer so Kiri decides to stay overnight with Iwai much to their embarrassment. As Iwai bathe, Kiri reveals to her about his ancestor, Norma Grayland, who was an infamous foreign serial killer to have killed 200 people. Then a blackout happens, Iwai jumps out and hugs Kiri naked. It strikes midnight as her hair processing grows to Kiri’s enthusiasm. The mindless Sledgehammer breaks through the wall and begins chasing Iwai. Kiri fearlessly defeats the Sledgehammer guy who later commits suicide. Kiri vows to help Iwai even if he has to become a murderer himself.
4	"—Where Is the Visitor?—"; Transliteration: "—Kyaku wa Doko da—" (Japanese: ―客は何処だ―)	April 27, 2013
A month after the Sledgehammer incident, Iwai has been more on guard about Authors, and the students now move to the third-year in spring. Kiri convinces Yamane to act normally. As a change of pace, Kiri asks her if there was any place she wants to visit with her new found freedom. She mentions her father and his travels...and invites Kiri and friends to a food bar. Meeting the employees: Koizumi Houichi a deaf man, and Karuko Hitomi a blind woman with a white piano. Kiri took a step outside to meet Seigi Nakajima an Author with his Killing Good "The Rulebook of Sentencing and Execution" summoning a hanged rope. Before taking action, a police officer Kozakura Zenigata intervenes as Nakajima briefly hangs her to his escape. Later, after the unconscious Kozakura wakes up, Kiri and the Byōinzaka sisters discuss about Nakajima. In the end, it is revealed Karuko's piano is the Killing Good "Pianissimo of Ecstatic Symphony" and Koizumi is her Instead.
5	"—Before the Game—"; Transliteration: "—Bifoa da Geimu—" (Japanese: ―ビフォア・ダ・ゲイム―)	May 4, 2013
Kiri and Iwai have made plans to cut her hair during a school orienteering trip up the mountains. Iwai is enjoying the new experiences she is having as Kiri frets over his relationship status with Iwai. Tomorrow night, the school trip is thrown into chaos when a new Author of the higher scholars’ makes an attempt on the Hair Queen's assassination after receiving a message from an unknown Gossip observer yesterday. Iwai finds Kiri's scissors in the high school's lodge while seeing the boys under a state of hypnosis.
6	"—Waltz of Stars—"; Transliteration: "—Hoshi no Warutsu—" (Japanese: ―星のワルツ―)	May 11, 2013
Kiri and the male students are being manipulated by vice president Ruka Shihōdō's Killing Good "Pet Whip of Submissive Butchery" with President Romio Zaiga as her Instead. Iwai's voice reached Kiri before he is commanded to do the unthinkable. Kiri injuries Zaiga with Crime Edge, then Nakajima appears and revealed he used the two presidents for a chance to make a play for the Hair Queen, leaving Ruka traumatic. Yamane arrives with Kozakura speaking through hers cellphone and microphone to tolerate Nakajima's actions then he takes his leave for now. With Ruka surrendering, Romio eases her depression as Iwai also shares her compassion despite their previous actions. Tonight, Kiri and Iwai dance alone together under the starry night sky.
7	"—The Silver Coins of Balance—"; Transliteration: "—Tenbin no Ginka—" (Japanese: ―天秤の銀貨―)	May 18, 2013
8	"—Party Chopper—"; Transliteration: "—Pātīchoppa—" (Japanese: ―パーティーチョッパ―)	May 25, 2013
Arriving at the Gossip party, many of the guests were making suspicious remarks. A play depicting the tale of the Hair Queen is the party entertainment. Kiri and Iwai are unknowingly lead backstage to get into costume for the next act, but this will leave one of them hanging. Nakajima set them up, with Iwai in a cage, and uses his Killing Good to hang Kiri as he struggles from getting choked to death to counteract in front of the Byōinzaka sisters and the audience.
9	"—Lyrical Night Fright—"; Transliteration: "—Ririkaru. Naito. Furaito—" (Japanese: ―リリカル・ナイト・フライト―)	June 1, 2013
Nakajima has broken the rules of the party causing the host who wish to remain anonymous, Lady Violet Witchy, to intervene and correct Nakajima's behavior. Kiri breaks free from the rope, and finds Nakajima stabbed to death. With the party ended, the police including Kozakura interrogate Kiri and Iwai upon Nakajima's death. Kiri asks Kozakura what she felt of Nakajima, saying he didn't care of having an Instead, but she did like him as she shed tears. Kiri and Iwai then intimate their feelings for each other.
10	"—Standing Babe-ation—"; Transliteration: "—Sutandingu. Beibēshon—" (Japanese: ―スタンディング・ベイベーション―)	June 8, 2013
While reminiscing about the previous night, Iwai discovers that her hair has not grown back to its original state. Fearful and unsure of how Kiri would react she breaks off all plans with him, much to his dismay. Meanwhile, a unique and deadly Author has set their eyes on a distracted Iwai. In a shopping mall, Iwai meets the Author, a child named Emily, who addresses her as "big sister". Iwai spends time with Emily until they go into a restroom, Emily reveals that she intends to kill the Hair Queen in act for revenge for her dead father. Luckily, Kiri was in the same building and catches Emily. Putting aside of seeing Iwai's hair not grown he reaches the rooftop and battles Emily against her unique Killing Goods "The Opener of Bloody Dissection" a pair of knives.
11	"—Red Rising—"; Transliteration: "—Reddo. Raijingu—" (Japanese: ―レッド・ライジング―)	June 15, 2013
Kiri is frightened of Emily. Kiri slowly suffers from blood loss by the wounded scar, that Emily had inflicted upon him. Yamane injected some of her own blood into Kiri, said to him that she met the original of her Killing Good, and Kiri immediately set off to find info about Grayland, the original of his Killing Good, so that he can meet Grayland hoping to make him stronger. At the same time, Iwai does research through her father's studies involving the Killing Goods and his adopted daughter - Emily.
12	"―Forbidden Games―"; Transliteration: "—Kinjirareta Asobi―" (Japanese: ―禁じられた遊び―)	June 23, 2013
The story starts with information that people don't believe that Grayland exist because there is no way that he can kill 200 people. Kiri found Emily at her father's grave as that day is her father's death anniversary. Emily states she will kill Iwai, Kiri wants to get her to be scared of him so that she might stop trying to kill Iwai. But when they fight Kiri loses and ends up falling of the cliff. Just when Kiri thought he would die, he dreamt about the original, he knew that if this somehow can make him stronger then he would do anything. Kiri followed Grayland into a door underground, once inside he found a room filled with corpses and Grayland starts cutting their flesh apart, forcing Kiri to become one with Grayland. Without realizing Kiri stands up with his two hands and feet in the ground with holding his scissor in his mouth in a state of insanity. Kiri cuts Emily's arm. She notices that Kiri has the ability of pain augmentation, at that time she feels her hand hurting so much. When Iwai comes to the scene, she finds Kiri's bag and immediately searches for Kiri, but instead finds Emily with blood everywhere in agony. Emily then admits that Crime Edge is the most brutal Killing Good.
13	"—Grayland is in the House—"; Transliteration: "―Gurērando. Izuinzahausu―" (Japanese: ―グレイランド・イズインザハウス―)	June 26, 2013
Iwai carries the wounded Emily as a forest fire spreads. She sympathizes with Emily telling her how much their father cared about them. The murderous Kiri appears and walks up to Iwai touching her body and then violently cuts her hair. Kiri then regains consciousness and passes out. Iwai comprehends the fear within her, and her hair suddenly grows long again. Later, Kiri is being hospitalize at a clinic owned by the Gossip after Emily called for a rescue department. Iwai and Emily take a bath together as they recover from their injuries and form a sister-like relationship. Emily intimates Iwai if she and Kiri are dating or ever had sex, Iwai admits she has feelings for Kiri, in spite of how scary he can be. Meanwhile, Kiri wakes up on a hospital bed and receives an unexpected visit from Lady Violet Witchy. She gives Kiri a rough discussion on the Killing Goods and their Authors. Then she impulsively gives him his first kiss before saying that his days as a murderer are far from done. The next day, Kiri is overjoyed to be cutting Iwai's hair once again with his scissors. During the credits, we see flashes of various events that Kiri, Iwai and co. go through following this episode, hinting that there may be another season to come.

== Reception ==
Carl Kimlinger of Anime News Network published a positive review covering the first half of the anime series. While expressing criticism towards its "messy" transitions into different genres, Kimlinger praised it for its direction in atmosphere and action, funny humor and viewing the perverse Author/Instead relationships in a "redemptive" light. Kimlinger wrote that the subject matter of the first half will not be to everyone's liking. Richard Eisenbeis of Kotaku talked about the complete anime series, expressing interest in the world and its cast of diverse characters but felt that it was bogged down by its constant genre jumping and unsatisfying ending. Aiden Foote, writing for THEM Anime Reviews, gave praise to the show's two main leads and supporting cast for their quirks and aesthetics being "interesting and varied" but found it overall to be "a limp Future Diary clone" with poor pacing and an unfinished plot. While not giving it a recommendation, Foote said that: "It remains perfectly watchable - don't get me wrong - but never anything more than that."
