= Yūji Yamaguchi =

Japanese film director

Yūji Yamaguchi (山口祐司, Yamaguchi Yūji; fl. 1983–2019, died before 9 January 2020) (Note: He used the pen name Isao Torada (虎田 功, Torada Isao) as director of AM Driver) was a Japanese anime director who directed the Fate/stay night TV series and the Fate/stay night: Unlimited Blade Works film.

== Career ==
Yamaguchi directed several anime series, including Angel Links (1999), I My Me! Strawberry Eggs (2001), Yami to Bōshi to Hon no Tabibito (2003), AM Driver (2004–2005), and Tōka Gettan (2007). He was the director of the 2006 anime adaptation of the Fate/stay night visual novel, and he subsequently directed the 2010 theatrical installment Fate/stay night: Unlimited Blade Works. He later directed The Severing Crime Edge (2013), and Z/X Ignition (2014). He directed episodes of Divergence Eve, GeGeGe no Kitarō, Hajime no Ippo, Outlaw Star, Suite and Smile PreCure!, and The King of Braves GaoGaiGar, and its sequel Final.

Yamaguchi died of undisclosed causes sometime before 9 January 2020, when his death was announced by a subsequently-removed tweet by Fate/stay night company Studio Deen. Animators Tomomi Mochizuki and Asako Nishida, who both worked with Yamaguchi, expressed their condolences following Yamaguchi's death.

== Works ==
=== Director ===
- Angel Links (1999)
- I My Me! Strawberry Eggs (2001)
- Yami to Bōshi to Hon no Tabibito (2003)
- AM Driver (2004–2005)
- Fate/stay night (2006)
- Tōka Gettan (2007)
- Fate/stay night: Unlimited Blade Works (2010)
- The Severing Crime Edge (2013)
- Z/X Ignition (2014)

=== Episode director ===
- Divergence Eve
- GeGeGe no Kitarō
- Hajime no Ippo
- Outlaw Star
- Smile PreCure!
- Suite PreCure
- The King of Braves GaoGaiGar
- The King of Braves GaoGaiGar Final
