= Kazunari Kojima =

Japanese voice actor (born 1977)

- 小嶋 一成
- Born: December 12, 1977 (age 48); Tokyo, Japan
- Occupation: Voice actor

Kazunari Kojima (小嶋 一成, Kojima Kazunari; born December 12, 1977 in Tokyo) is a Japanese voice actor.

== Filmography ==
=== Anime ===
- Hatarakiman – Editorial staff
- Zipang – Asou
- Fresh Pretty Cure – Staff
- Casshern Sins – Robot
- Saint Saiya Hades Elysiun-Hen – Nachi
- Saint Seiya Hades Underworld Edition – Nachi
- Yu-Gi-Oh! Duel Monsters – Mahad
- The Prince of Tennis – Tom Griffy
- Capeta – Wada
- AM Driver – Nilgis
- Zatch Bell! – Brago; Praying Mantis Joe
- Bobobo-bo Bo-bobo – Kuruman
- Ashita no Nadja – Bianco

=== Live-action dubbing ===
- Andromeda 3 – Chang
- Steel – Simon

=== Video games ===
- Spectacle Force Genesis – Jay Dagger
- Yamiyo ni sasayaku - tantei sagara kyōichirō (I whisper in the dark night, detective kyoichiro sagara) – Sho Kisaragi
- Tales of Symphonia
