= Ikuo Towhata =

Japanese academic

Ikuo Towhata (東畑 郁生, Tōhata Ikuo) is a geotechnical engineering professor at the University of Tokyo. Currently, he is the chief editor of "Soils and Foundations," a civil engineering journal. His research work is mainly in the areas of liquefaction of soil during earthquakes.

Towhata has published more than 470 publications which has been cited more than 10,000 times including books, book editorship, book chapters, peer-reviewed journal papers, and conference proceedings.
