= Yami to Bōshi to Hon no Tabibito =

Japanese adult visual novel

- Cover of Yami to Bōshi to Hon no Tabibito (DVD-ROM)

ヤミと帽子と本の旅人
- Genre: Fantasy, Romance
- Video game
- Developer: Root
- Publisher: Orbit
- Genre: Eroge, Visual novel
- Platform: Windows
- Released: December 20, 2002
- Manga
- Written by: Root
- Illustrated by: Aya Sakurai
- Published by: Kadokawa Shoten
- Magazine: Comptiq
- Published: 2003
- Volumes: 1
- Anime television series
- Directed by: Yūji Yamaguchi
- Produced by: Yoshihito Takaya; Yūichirō Takahata; Nobumitsu Urasaki
- Written by: Tomomi Mochizuki
- Music by: Akifumi Tada
- Studio: Studio Deen
- Licensed by: NA: Anime Works
- Original network: JNN (MBS)
- English network: US: Toku
- Original run: October 2, 2003 – December 25, 2003
- Episodes: 13

Yami to Bōshi to Hon no Tabibito (ヤミと帽子と本の旅人; translated as Yami, the Hat, and the Travelers of the Books), also known as Yamibō/Yamibou for short, is a Japanese adult visual novel published in December 2002 by Root. A 13-episode anime series produced by Studio Deen aired between October and December 2003. Although the characters and their relationships remain basically the same in the game and anime, the storyline is different.

== Plot ==
=== Game ===
The game begins with a girl who is taken to a strange, magical realm by a dragon. She apparently was taken to the library where all past, present, and future realities are kept within the books. The player is a young man who has come from one of these books as well, but has forgotten his way back home. The player is commissioned to find the missing girl by the denizens of the library, and starts his search by entering different books.

=== Anime ===
The story follows the travels of Hazuki Azuma, a tall, brooding high-school girl, as she searches for her adopted older sister and love interest, Hatsumi, in many different "book worlds". After the disappearance of her sister, a talking parakeet nicknamed Ken-chan introduces Hazuki to Lilith, the caretaker of the Great Library. Each book in the library contains a different world, and the guardian of the library takes on the title Yami.

== Characters ==
Hazuki Azuma (東 葉月, Azuma Hazuki)
Voiced by: Yuki Iwata (game), Mamiko Noto (anime)
Hazuki is a very tall, quiet and serious girl, with long dark blue hair and sharp blue eyes. She uses the relatively masculine first person pronoun "boku". She appears to be very popular among girls, with admirers developing crushes on her on many occasions both in school and in several book worlds. Hazuki is cold and unfriendly, but not particularly rude (e.g. throwing away the gift that a female admirer gave her as soon as the girl went out of sight). She is deeply in love and is fiercely protective of Hatsumi, is shown to have been masturbated to the thought of Hatsumi's body and fended off boys trying to approach the girl.
Hatsumi Azuma (東 初美, Azuma Hatsumi)
Voiced by: Anna Akashi (game), Ai Shimizu (anime)
Hatsumi is Hazuki's adopted older sister and love interest. Hatsumi appears to be mute (though it is proven otherwise on several occasions) and communicates mostly through gestures and facial expressions. Despite being older, Hatsumi is much shorter than Hazuki. Although it seems that Hazuki's love is one-sided, episode seven shows that Hatsumi does have feelings for Hazuki and was trying to express herself as best as she could with the knowledge that she cannot stay beyond her sixteenth birthday (suggestions of this were shown along the way by her sending Hazuki anonymous love letters—later expressed in full and in words toward the end of the anime). In the first episode, Hatsumi disappears in a burst of green light ("sōma") at midnight on her sixteenth birthday, as Hazuki tries to steal a kiss in her sleep. The events that follow lead Hazuki to a mysterious library in another dimension, in which all the worlds are kept in books. Hazuki learns from the Library guardian, Lilith, that Hatsumi is only one of the forms of the previous guardian (Eve), and that Eve stays in different books for fun until she turns sixteen.
Lilith (リリス, Ririsu)
Voiced by: Saki Asamiya (game), Sanae Kobayashi (anime)
Lilith is the guardian of the library. She is the third Yami, after Adam, the creator of all the worlds, and Eve. In the anime, Lilith is attracted to Hazuki and flirts relentlessly, though she is always turned down. Lilith appears to dislike Eve and have interest only in her own ends, but her kind and vulnerable sides are sometimes shown, especially when she encounters children in trouble; adults do not seem to move her to compassion as much. Her more childish mannerisms are fairly constant, but Lilith sometimes shows considerable wisdom and knowledge. She claims that Eve left the duty of being Yami and went off to play in the book worlds, and so she wants to find Eve and return her to the library.
Ken (ケン)
Voiced by: Reiko Takagi (anime)
Ken is a yellow cockatiel who can talk. In the anime, he accompanies Lilith in her travels, while in the game he accompanies the nameless main character. He speaks in very heavy Kansai-ben. Ken is loud, obnoxious, lecherous and perverted, as well as overly confident and a bit too slow to stay out of trouble. He usually ends up punched, squashed, beaten or otherwise violated, either as a result of tasks given to him by Lilith, or because of his big mouth and perverted tendencies. In the game, his true form is a kendappa and he is working for Arya. He serves as a comic relief in the series.
Arya (アーヤ, Āya)
Voiced by: Jun Fukuyama (anime)
Arya is a mysterious silver-haired boy who appears in every episode of the anime and during certain times in the game. In the anime he claims to be cleaning up after Hazuki and Lilith. Also, he offers to perform repairs on Tamamonomae's Space Hall. He is always cosplaying as some type of character or animal. At the end of the anime series, he is shown closing a book that seems to contain the world of the Book Keepers. He is the main narrator of the story, and his short exits and introductions are often the only transition between stories.
Kogechibi (コゲチビ)
Voiced by: Ai Shimizu (anime)
Kogechibi lives in the library, and looks like a four-inch (102 mm) tall Eve, though with different colored eyes. "Koge" refers to the one-eyed cloak that covers all of her but the eyes. In the game, when the main character is occupying "Koge", the girl is referred to as "O-chibi-chan" ("o" being an honorific and "chan" an endearment). Kogechibi's vocabulary is composed of unintellible sounds akin to baby talk. In the anime, she has a disturbing love of fireworks and can say a few words if they have something to do with explosives. She plays a small part in the plot, but is mostly comic relief in the anime. In the game, it is revealed that the guardians "fragment" when they overexert themselves, and that the fragments take on a life of their own. Kogechibi is a fragment of Eve.
Gargantua (ガルガンチュア, Garuganchua)
Voiced by: Shinichiro Miki (anime), Romi Park (anime, young)
Gargantua appears in episode two of the anime as a madman, with three bumbling demonic henchmen and a servant named Seiren (derived from the Hellenic Siren). His main goal is to find Eve who is present as the mute, magic-using Jill, assistant caretaker of the orphanage. Gargantua is fiercely attached to her, and accidentally stabs her fatally with a knife when he jealously tries to dislodge a fellow orphan, Ritsuko, from Jill's arms. Jill's body disappears in an explosion of souma, drenching the two children in her life force. In the game, Gargantua and the main character both hold and try to acquire more fragments of Eve. For a while, Gargantua takes over Joe Harry and the command of the "hunters" (smaller, one-eyed hat-looking creatures). At the end of the anime, thanks to Eve and Tamamonomae, Gargantua has a change of heart and returns to the realm Lilith gave him for the sacrifice of princess Mariel, taking Ritsuko with him.
Ritsuko (リツコ)
Voiced by: Tomomi Misaki (game), Kikuko Inoue (anime)
Ritsuko is an immortal magic user and appears no older than 25, despite being over a century old. Ritsuko travels the countryside performing healing miracles. She has never forgotten Jill or Gargantua, and carries small portraits of them in her locket. When she comes to the castle to heal Princess Mariel, she is taken in as the court alchemist. While escorting the princess around the village, Ritsuko meets Gargantua, who is also immortal because of Jill's souma and has learned dark magic. He kidnaps Princess Mariel and tries to sacrifice her to Lilith, in order to be shown where Eve is. Ritsuko stops him only too late and is framed for the kidnapping and thrown into a dungeon. Ritsuko is a user of sexual magic in the game, and one of the bodies occupied by the player is under her spell. She has a clone who was made by future herself, which is also seen travelling through the books with two children. At the end of the anime, thanks to some interference by Eve and Tamamonomae, Gargantua returns for Ritsuko, freeing her from her cell and taking her back with him to his own realm.
Milka (ミルカ, Miruka)
Voiced by: Miyu Matsuki (anime)
Milka appears in episode six under the care of Seiren. She is a girl with a cruel past who is trapped in her five-year-old body. Milka lives on an island, and has no one to befriend but Seiren and her white tiger, Rascaless. Her initial caretaker was an older woman who used to whip the child as a punishment for such trivial offences. Eventually, the old woman is killed by Rascaless when Milka is not watching. Initially afraid of Hazuki and Lilith, she warms up to them and has Seiren take them to the villa at the center of the island. In the game, Milka is sent to live on the island by her older brother, for whom she has romantic feelings, because of her poor health. Seiren sings on the cliffs everyday to keep all of Milka's brother's soldiers under her spell, and Milka on the island. After Seiren and Lilith's reconciliation, Milka goes back to her brother with Rascaless.
Fujihime (藤姫; Princess Fuji or Princess of the Wisteria)
Voiced by: Anna Akashi (game), Ai Shimizu (anime)
Fujihime appears in a book-world that corresponds to the samurai era of Japan. Fujihime looks like Hatsumi, but has purple eyes instead of red. Fujihime is not another form of Eve. She is the spirit of a Japanese wisteria (called Fuji) who is gifted power from Eve. She can talk, and possesses the comb with which Hatsumi was using, in modern-day Japan.
Meirin (メイリン)
Voiced by: Ayaka Kimura (game), Kyoko Hikami (anime)
Meirin is a cheerful, wily kitsune girl with two tails who is trying to "raise her rank" by getting close to the princess. The player of the game meets Meirin after he enters a body, the previous owner of which she unintentionally kills. To make up for it, she takes him to Fujihime.
Lala (ララ, Rara)
Voiced by: Yukana (anime)
Lala is the monolithic AI controlling the spaceship upon which Hazuki and the others find themselves in episode ten. The ship is an "emigration spaceship" taking the former inhabitants of Earth on a search for a new home planet. None of the passengers appear over ten years old, yet they have been drifting for over two hundred years. Hazuki and Lilith discover that all the adults died in a plague nine years ago. Eve appeared in this world as Lular over a hundred years ago, and had vanished on her sixteenth birthday while fixing a malfunctioning part. This futuristic world and its characters do not appear in the game.
Tamamonomae (玉藻の前, Tamamo no Mae)
Voiced by: Ayaka Kimura (game), Kyoko Hikami (anime)
Tamaonomae appears to be Meirin's future form as a kitsune woman with nine tails, though she exists in a different world. The world is not book world, it is named Sen-Kai, which is greater than the library. In the anime, she and Meirin may simply be alternative versions of one another; she described Meirin as her "other self", which in context may mean that Meirin is her creation or an independent creature which fissioned off from Tamamonomae. But in another (but same company's) game, she is a really Meirin's future form. Despite her sexual and alcoholic tendencies, is not an unsympathetic character; she has considerable insight into people and does some fairly altruistic things for some of the other characters; she restores Mariel to human form, helps Gargantua to acknowledge the truth, returns the Hat to Eve and finally seems to have taken Gargantua's henchmen in as permanent guests.
Seiren (セイレン)
Voiced by: Terrier (game), Rie Kanda (anime)
Seiren is a beautiful, blue-haired woman who initially appears as Gargantua's ally in the anime. He describes her as a devil, but apparently trusts her, using her aid in his search for Eve. Seiren holds a grudge against Lilith, claiming that she was abandoned by her. She is most upset when they meet again on Milka's island and Lilith does not even remember her.
Yōko Sumeragi (皇 蓉子, Sumeragi Yōko)
Voiced by: Pomeranian (game), Sayaka Ohara (anime)
A woman who appears in a book-world that corresponds to the Russo-Japan War era. She is an intelligence agent and an expert martial artist noted for sending three colleagues into hospital during training. Yōko arrives on a train somewhere corresponding to contemporary Russian Siberia, cross-dressing as a male diplomat and attempting to link up with fellow agent Kohtaro Nanbu, codenamed "Adam", for a film containing radio codes.
Princess Mariel (マリエル)
Voiced by: Hina Kamimura (game), Hiroko Kasahara (anime)
A princess in Ritsuko and Gargantua's world. One day, when she is placed under Ritsuko's care, she meets Gargantua and eventually develops a crush on him. She is later kidnapped and sacrificed to Lilith by Gargantua, committing suicide by poison, but is reincarnated and employed as a maid by Tamamonomae.

== Adaptations ==
=== Manga ===
There is a one-book manga adaptation, Yami to Bōshi to Hon no Tabibito ~Romance, illustrated by Aya Sakurai. It is a compressed version of the game's events, following the storyline that leads to a romantic relationship between the nameless main character and Lilith.

=== Anime ===
A 13-episode anime television series adaptation was produced by Avex mode and Studio Deen and directed by Yūji Yamaguchi, with Tomomi Mochizuki handling series scripts, Asako Nishida designing the characters, Tomochi Kosaka designing the props and Akifumi Tada composing the music. As a UHF anime, it aired in Japan between October 2 and December 25, 2003, on MBS-affiliated networks for 13 episodes. The anime's opening theme is "Hitomi no Naka no Meikyū" by Aiko Kayō and the ending theme is "Eien no Inori o Sasagete" by Sanae Kobayashi. The anime was licensed for release in North America by Anime Works. It will be broadcast on Toku beginning on July 19, 2016.

Although there was frequent mention in the anime's pre-broadcast publicity that "all the characters will appear", copyright-infringing characters, such as Erosuke and the train conductor, as well as some male and non-human characters, did not make an appearance.

==== Episodes ====
No.	Title	Directed by	Written by	Original release date
1	"Hazuki" (Japanese: 葉月)	Yūji Yamaguchi	Tomomi Mochizuki; Toshifumi Kawase	October 2, 2003
Hazuki Azuma has developed a sexual attraction to her adopted older sister Hatsumi. Hatsumi, however, disappears on the morning of her 16th birthday. Hazuki goes world-hopping in search of Hatsumi along with her companions, a Kansai dialect-speaking bird, Ken, and the hat-wearing Lilith who know Hatsumi by the name Eve.
2	"Yōko" (Japanese: 容子)	Teruo Satō	Toshifumi Kawase	October 9, 2003
On board the train, Yoko smacks down the Colonel and is sheltered by the Siberian tiger who brings Adam to her. They are then confronted at gun point by the drunk and the train conductor who are also undercover spies. Everyone except her is killed, however the Siberian tiger is a double agent and sends her through the window. Yoko recovers and with Hazuki take down Siberian tiger. Hazuki, who had helped Adam earlier, helps Yoko to find the bomb and hands over the decoder at the destination.
3	"Jill"; Transliteration: "Jiru" (Japanese: ジル)	Yasuhiro Minami	Tomomi Mochizuki; Rika Nakase	October 16, 2003
Hazuki arrives in the Great Library and meets Lilith, who develops a crush on her because she contains the essence of Yami, once the protector of the Great Library and Lilith's lover. Hatsumi turns out to be an incarnation of Eve, who Lilith wants returned to the Library. Hazuki unenthusiastically accepts Lilith's help traveling the worlds.
4	"Mariel"; Transliteration: "Marieru" (Japanese: マリエル)	Yūki Hayashi	Rika Nakase	October 23, 2003
Ritsuko is serving the princess Mariel. Mariel falls for the charms of Gargantua, now an alchemist. His attempt to sacrifice her is foiled by Ritsuko, but the princess is rendered half-demon and takes her own life. Lilith appears before Gargantua and accepts Mariel’s soul as payment.
5	"Quill"; Transliteration: "Kwiru" (Japanese: クィル)	Shunji Yoshida	Hideki Shirane	October 30, 2003
Hazuki and Lilith reach a prehistoric world. Lilith is mistaken for a god. A cavegirl named Quill develops a crush on Hazuki, offering herself up as a sacrifice. The real god appears but is defeated by Hazuki; the search is another dead end.
6	"Milka"; Transliteration: "Miruka" (Japanese: ミルカ)	Teruo Satō	Tomomi Mochizuki	November 7, 2003
Hazuki and Lilith arrive on an island and meet a young girl, Milka, her white tiger, and the demoness Seiren. Milka does not age and suffers from "mindquakes" related to the Great Library.
7	"Hatsumi" (Japanese: 初美)	Hideki Okamoto	Tomomi Mochizuki	November 14, 2003
Milka is saved by her white tiger. Arya reveals that Seiren was a demoness spawned by Lilith; Seiren was only interested in harnessing Milka's power. Hazuki and Lilith give their boat to Milka and return to the Great Library, fixing the torn book and curing Milka. A long flashback shows Hazuki and Hatsumi's life before the latter's disappearance.
8	"Fujihime" (Japanese: 藤姫)	Yasuhiro Minami	Hideki Shirane	November 21, 2003
Hazuki saves a cute fox spirit, Meirin, from a band of samurai in a feudal Japanese world. She encounters Princess Fuji, who looks identical to Hatsumi except that she speaks. She also uses the same ornate comb that Hatsumi had, and the legend about the comb is the same Eve legend. Ninjas intent on gaining Princess Fuji's mysterious power attack the mansion while Lilith and Meirin ride their coattails in. Inspired by Kaguya-hime.
9	"Meirin" (Japanese: メイリン)	Yūki Hayashi	Hideki Shirane; Rika Nakase	November 28, 2003
Lilith foils the ninjas’ attempts to steal the comb by accident, while a charged up Hazuki rescues Princess Fuji from the head ninja. Lilith casually says that the presence of the comb means that Eve was in this world. Meirin gets summoned to Gargantua's dimension because he thought she had the comb. Princess Fuji had actually given it to Hazuki, and they embrace in the moonlight. A long flashback then deals with the aftermath of episode four, when Lilith accepted Mariel’s soul from Gargantua in exchange for a world of his own. He still refuses her charms and resolves to find Eve, the source of eternal life.
10	"Layla"; Transliteration: "Reira" (Japanese: レイラ)	Akira Toba	Tomomi Mochizuki; Rika Nakase	December 5, 2003
Lilith appears in Gargantua's world but dimension-doors out. A nine-tailed fox spirit opens her own door into Gargantua's world; Gargantua and his troll trio charge through and find themselves in a world of rooms which link to many worlds. Meanwhile Lilith and Hazuki arrive aboard a colonization spaceship where a computer is caring for a whole cohort of children whose parents have all become "immobile" and which is itself failing and malfunctioning. A habitable planet must be found soon for the survival of the children.
11	"Tamamonomae"; Transliteration: "Tamamo no mae" (Japanese: 玉藻の前)	Teruo Satō	Tomomi Mochizuki; Rika Nakase	December 14, 2003
With Lilith’s help, the ship warps within reach of a suitable planet. Hazuki learns that an Eve incarnation called Lular appeared and then vanished on board a hundred years ago. The children land on the planet with the DNA samples of Earth's animals; later, Lilith and Hazuki arrive in the universe garden. They meet Gargantua and his trolls, Mariel, Tamamonomae. The latter easily removes Lilith’s Hat, reducing her to tears.
12	"Gargantua"; Transliteration: "Garganchua" (Japanese: ガルガンチュア)	Yasuhiro Minami	Rika Nakase	December 18, 2003
Gargantua, Hazuki and Lilith all argue over Jill/Hatsumi/Eve, who stops their bickering. She consents to Tamamonomae returning the Hat to her head and disappears back to the Great Library as a result. It seems that in most of the worlds where she has been her disappearance has not left any major problems — except for the three who have been pursuing her across worlds. She then tries to set things right. Gargantua finally realizes that it is Ritsuko that he loves rather than Jill. He rescues her from her cell and reshapes his world into a bright and cheerful one where he and Ritsuko, who seem to have been made immortal by the Door of Eve, can live together happily ever after.
13	"Lilith"; Transliteration: "Ririsu" (Japanese: リリス)	Hideki Okamoto	Tomomi Mochizuki	December 25, 2003
Lilith lashes out at Eve for abandoning her in the Great Library for what seems to be tens of thousands of years and Eve tries to make it up to her. Lilith notices that Eve misses Hazuki, who seems not to have returned to the correct book-world. Alone again, Hazuki reflects on her dreamlike adventures, but suddenly sees Hatsumi returning to the house. History repeats itself, like a universe reset, but Hatsumi does not glow and disappear at the stroke of midnight. Instead Hatsumi and Hazuki share a passionate kiss and then a cuddle. Hazuki awakens the next day not remembering anything, but notices the signs of Hatsumi's future rebirth as her child.

=== Video game ===
A spin-off game exists known as Yami to Bōshi to Hon no Tabibito Typing Travellers (ヤミと帽子と本の旅人 タイピングトラベラー) was released in 2004, it intended to teach typing skills. It was based on the anime and even uses screencaps from it.

== Reception ==
Theron Martin of Anime News Network called the series a "true oddity" for not being picked up for an English sub by Media Blasters until 2013, but was not released until 2016. He also called the series odd because it does not "resemble anything else out there" as it has its origins in an adult visual novel and noted that the storytelling approach is not linear, with the mechanics for the world-shifting in the series being "an interdimensional library". He said that while the storytelling is strong, some characters appear but are never explored, humor is weak, and criticized the animation style. Even so, he said that the character designs are strong, adding that the series has fan service, the yuri element is not very pervasive, and says that the series has a diverse set of music. He concluded that while watching the series is one that "requires some patience", viewers will "be rewarded" through their time watching the series, making it worth their while.
