= AM Driver =

Japanese anime television series

- Cover for North American DVD

Get Ride! アムドライバー (Get Ride! Amu Doraibā)
- Genre: Mecha, Drama
- Anime television series
- Directed by: Yūji Yamaguchi
- Produced by: Norio Yamagawa; Masanori Miyake
- Written by: Satoshi Namiki
- Music by: Kazunori Maruyama
- Studio: Studio Deen
- Licensed by: NA: Illumitoon Entertainment Westlake Entertainment
- Original network: TV Tokyo
- Original run: April 5, 2004 – March 28, 2005
- Episodes: 51
- Manga
- Written by: Noriyuki Konishi
- Published by: Shogakukan
- Magazine: CoroCoro Comic
- Original run: June 2004 – February 2005
- Volumes: 1
- Video game

Get Ride! Amdriver: Senkō no Hero Tanjō!
- Publisher: Konami
- Genre: Tactical role-playing game
- Platform: Game Boy Advance
- Released: JP: July 22, 2004
- Video game

Get Ride! Amdriver: Shutsugeki! Battle Party
- Publisher: Konami
- Genre: Party game
- Platform: Game Boy Advance
- Released: JP: December 16, 2004
- Video game

Get Ride! Amdriver: Sōkoku no Shinjitsu
- Publisher: Konami
- Genre: Action game
- Platform: PlayStation 2
- Released: JP: March 10, 2005

AM Driver, known in Japan as Get Ride! Amdriver (Get Ride! アムドライバー, Get Ride! Amu Doraibā), is an anime series produced by Studio Deen, TV Tokyo and Nihon Ad Systems. It is directed by Yūji Yamaguchi, with Satoshi Namiki handling series composition, Eiji Suganuma designing the characters and Kazunori Maruyama composing the music. The series aired on TV Tokyo and its affiliate stations from April 5, 2004, to March 28, 2005. A manga adaptation by Noriyuki Konishi was serialized in CoroCoro Comic from the June 2004 issue to the February 2005 issue. Two Game Boy Advance games and one PlayStation 2 game published by Konami have also been released.

The series was the first completely original work produced by Nihon Ad Systems, who have previously only produced works based on manga and video games. As a result of various planning discussions, it was decided to develop a life-size hero with the concept of a person "putting on" a mecha by having a person in a power suit board the mecha and transforming and combining with the mecha, rather than a robot.

It was originally picked up for Distribution by Illumitoon Entertainment in August 2006 and planned to release it a year later in 2007, however after Illumitoon Entertainment ceased operations in Late 2007 after Westlake ceased distribution of their titles, the series hasn't been avalible in the US since.

== Plot ==
The story takes place in the future world of Earth, which has been under attack by mechanical life forms known as "bugchines" for several years. The masses were living in fear, as no weaponry could stand up to the bugchines. To turn back this menace, warriors called AM Drivers are trained and armed with special weapons. The AM Drivers constantly fight to protect the general public. The most popular AM Drivers get larger budgets with which they may purchase more powerful weapons and defenses.

== Characters ==
=== Pure AM Driver ===
==== Current Member ====
Jenus Dira (ジェナス・ディラ, Jenasu Dira)
Voiced by: Kōsuke Kujirai
Ragna Laurairia (ラグナ・ラウレリア, Raguna Raureria)
Voiced by: Masaya Matsukaze
Sera May (セラ・メイナード, Sera Meinādo)
Voiced by: Risa Mizuno
Dark Kalhole (ダーク・カルホール, Dāku Karuhōru)
Voiced by: Teruaki Ogawa
Taft Krema (タフト・クレマー, Tafuto Kuremā)
Voiced by: Isshin Chiba
Paf Shining (パフ・シャイニン, Pafu Shainin)
Voiced by: Hiroko Kasahara
Julie Frum (ジュリ・ブルーム, Juri Burūmu)
Voiced by: Mika Sakenobe
June Frum (ジュネ・ブルーム, June Burūmu)
Voiced by: Akiko Kobayashi

==== Former Member ====
Scene Pierce (シーン・ピアース, Shīn Piāsu)
Voiced by: Kōji Yusa
Ivan Nyrguise (イヴァン・ニルギース, Ivan Nirugīsu)
Voiced by: Kazunari Kojima, Mika Itō (young)
Shasha (シャシャ)
Voiced by: Myco

== List of episodes ==
No.	Title	Directed by	Written by	Storyboarded by	Original release date
1	"First Battle"; Transliteration: "Fāsuto batoru" (Japanese: ファースト・バトル)	Yūji Yamaguchi	Satoshi Namiki	Yūji Yamaguchi; Takatsugu Kobayashi	5 April 2004
2	"Second Line"; Transliteration: "Sekando rain" (Japanese: セカンド・ライン)	Yasuhiro Minami	Satoshi Namiki	Yasuhito Kikuchi	12 April 2004
3	"Bordertack"; Transliteration: "Bōdatakku" (Japanese: ボーダタック)	Susumu Yamaguchi	Satoshi Namiki	Susumu Yamaguchi	19 April 2004
4	"Who are You"; Transliteration: "Fū ā yū" (Japanese: フーアーユー)	Shunji Yoshida	Satoshi Namiki	Masujirō Aozame	26 April 2004
5	"Visor on Stage"; Transliteration: "Baizāonsutēji" (Japanese: バイザーオンステージ)	Toshiyuki Katō	Satoshi Namiki	Itsuro Kawasaki	3 May 2004
6	"Board Visor"; Transliteration: "Bōdobaizā" (Japanese: ボードバイザー)	Ryouki Kamitsubo	Mushi Kōhei	Toshiya Shinohara	10 May 2004
7	"Rookies' Mission"; Transliteration: "Rūkīzu misshon" (Japanese: ルーキーズ・ミッション)	Yoshinari Suzuki	Rika Nakase	Itsuro Kawasaki	17 May 2004
8	"It's My Turn"; Transliteration: "Ittsu mai tān" (Japanese: イッツ・マイ・ターン)	Shunji Yoshida	Satoshi Namiki	Shunji Yoshida	24 May 2004
9	"Green Light"; Transliteration: "Gurīnraito" (Japanese: グリーンライト)	Yukio Okazaki	Mushi Kōhei	Masujirō Aozame	31 May 2004
10	"See You Again"; Transliteration: "Shī yū agein" (Japanese: シー・ユー・アゲイン)	Teruo Satō	Satoshi Namiki	Takatsugu Kobayashi	7 June 2004
11	"Confusion"; Transliteration: "Konfyūjon" (Japanese: コンフュージョン)	Toshiyuki Katō	Satoshi Namiki	Toshiyuki Katō	14 June 2004
12	"Comeback Game"; Transliteration: "Kamubakku gēmu" (Japanese: カムバック・ゲーム)	Ryouki Kamitsubo	Kenji Konuta	Itsuro Kawasaki	21 June 2004
13	"Little Friends"; Transliteration: "Ritoru furenzu" (Japanese: リトル・フレンズ)	Shunji Yoshida	Noboru Kimura	Shinji Takamatsu	28 June 2004
14	"Lonely Hero"; Transliteration: "Ronrī hīrō" (Japanese: ロンリー・ヒーロー)	Keitarō Motonaga	Rika Nakase	Jun Takada; Yūji Yamaguchi	5 July 2004
15	"Lost Pride"; Transliteration: "Rosuto puraido" (Japanese: ロスト・プライド)	Yoshinari Suzuki	Satoshi Namiki	Itsuro Kawasaki	12 July 2004
16	"Nightmare"; Transliteration: "Naitomea" (Japanese: ナイトメア)	Toshiyuki Katō	Satoshi Namiki	Megumi Yamamoto	19 July 2004
17	"Take Off"; Transliteration: "Teikuofu" (Japanese: テイクオフ)	Makoto Sokuza	Mushi Kōhei	Shinji Takamatsu	26 July 2004
18	"Missing Person"; Transliteration: "Misshingu pāson" (Japanese: ミッシング・パーソン)	Noriaki Akitaya	Kenji Konuta	Itsuro Kawasaki	2 August 2004
19	"Gun Zaldi"; Transliteration: "Gan zarudi" (Japanese: ガン・ザルディ)	Yoshinari Suzuki	Satoshi Namiki	Masujirō Aozame	9 August 2004
20	"Reset"; Transliteration: "Risetto" (Japanese: リセット)	Shunji Yoshida	Satoshi Namiki	Megumi Yamamoto	16 August 2004
21	"The Long Way"; Transliteration: "Za rongu wei" (Japanese: ザ・ロング・ウェイ)	Yūji Yamaguchi	Satoshi Namiki	Yūji Yamaguchi	23 August 2004
22	"Double Cross"; Transliteration: "Daburu kurosu" (Japanese: ダブル・クロス)	Masahito Otani	Satoshi Namiki	Teruo Satō; Yūji Yamaguchi	30 August 2004
23	"Paf Told Me"; Transliteration: "Pafu tōrudo mī" (Japanese: パフ・トールド・ミー)	Toshiyuki Katō	Rika Nakase	Toshiyuki Katō	6 September 2004
24	"Claymore"; Transliteration: "Kureimoa" (Japanese: クレイモア)	Ryōji Fujiwara	Mushi Kōhei	Itsuro Kawasaki	13 September 2004
25	"Underground"; Transliteration: "Andāguraundo" (Japanese: アンダーグラウンド)	Shunji Yoshida	Kenji Konuta	Ryōji Fujiwara	20 September 2004
26	"Operation Sissy"; Transliteration: "Operēshon shishī" (Japanese: オペレーション・シシー)	Yoshinari Suzuki	Satoshi Namiki	Yoshinari Suzuki; Megumi Yamamoto	27 September 2004
27	"Neo Cross Visor"; Transliteration: "Neokurosubaizā" (Japanese: ネオクロスバイザー)	Masahito Otani	Satoshi Namiki	Yukihiro Matsushita; Yūji Yamaguchi	4 October 2004
28	"Night Syndrome"; Transliteration: "Naito shindorōmu" (Japanese: ナイト・シンドローム)	Wataru Sakaibashi	Rika Nakase	Ryōji Fujiwara	11 October 2004
29	"Old Mechanic"; Transliteration: "Ōrudo mekanikku" (Japanese: オールド・メカニック)	Yukihiro Matsushita	Mushi Kōhei	Itsuro Kawasaki	18 October 2004
30	"Confession"; Transliteration: "Konfesshon" (Japanese: コンフェッション)	Shunji Yoshida	Satoshi Namiki	Yukihiro Matsushita; Ryōji Fujiwara	25 October 2004
31	"Miss You"; Transliteration: "Misu yū" (Japanese: ミス・ユー)	Toshiyuki Katō	Satoshi Namiki	Toshiyuki Katō	1 November 2004
32	"Break Away"; Transliteration: "Bureiku awei" (Japanese: ブレイク・アウェイ)	Hisakazu Ishikawa	Kenji Konuta	Yoshihiro Takamoto	8 November 2004
33	"Coming Back"; Transliteration: "Kamingu bakku" (Japanese: カミング・バック)	Isao Takayama	Toshifumi Kawase	Ryōji Fujiwara	15 November 2004
34	"Who is Spy"; Transliteration: "Fū Izu supai" (Japanese: フー・イズ・スパイ)	Shunji Yoshida	Rika Nakase	Hibari Nakayama	22 November 2004
35	"Second Piece"; Transliteration: "Sekando pīsu" (Japanese: セカンド・ピース)	Yoshinari Suzuki	Satoshi Namiki	Ryōji Fujiwara; Yoshinari Suzuki	29 November 2004
36	"Rowdy Spirits"; Transliteration: "Rōdisupirittsu" (Japanese: ローディスピリッツ)	Masahito Otani	Mushi Kōhei	Ryōji Fujiwara	6 December 2004
37	"Invitation"; Transliteration: "Inviteishon" (Japanese: インヴィテイション)	Akira Tsuchiya	Kenji Konuta	Itsuro Kawasaki	13 December 2004
38	"End of Meuron"; Transliteration: "Endo obu Mūron" (Japanese: エンド・オブ・ムーロン)	Yukihiro Matsushita	Toshifumi Kawase	Yukihiro Matsushita; Ryōji Fujiwara; Yūji Yamaguchi	20 December 2004
39	"Sacrifice"; Transliteration: "Sakurifaisu" (Japanese: サクリファイス)	Shunji Yoshida	Satoshi Namiki	Heijūrō Kamiya	27 December 2004
40	"Lady Supporter"; Transliteration: "Redi sapōtā" (Japanese: レディ・サポーター)	Masahito Otani	Satoshi Namiki	Yukihiro Matsushita	10 January 2005
41	"Battle Debut"; Transliteration: "Batoru debyū" (Japanese: バトル・デビュー)	Yoshinari Suzuki	Kenji Konuta	Hibari Nakayama	17 January 2005
42	"Lonely Fighter"; Transliteration: "Ronrī faitā" (Japanese: ロンリー・ファイター)	Toshiyuki Katō	Rika Nakase	Toshiyuki Katō	24 January 2005
43	"Return"; Transliteration: "Ritān" (Japanese: リターン)	Michita Shiraishi	Satoshi Namiki	Itsuro Kawasaki	31 January 2005
44	"Big Target"; Transliteration: "Biggu tāgetto" (Japanese: ビッグ・ターゲット)	Tomoko Hiramuki	Mushi Kōhei	Ryōji Fujiwara	7 February 2005
45	"Old Castle"; Transliteration: "Ōrudo kyassuru" (Japanese: オールド・キャッスル)	Teruo Satō	Kenji Konuta	Nobuhiro Aoyanagi; Yūji Yamaguchi	14 February 2005
46	"Decision"; Transliteration: "Dishijon" (Japanese: ディシジョン)	Shunji Yoshida	Rika Nakase	Ryōji Fujiwara	21 February 2005
47	"Forgiven"; Transliteration: "Fōgibun" (Japanese: フォーギブン)	Toshiyuki Katō	Satoshi Namiki	Toshiyuki Katō	28 February 2005
48	"Disappear"; Transliteration: "Disuapia" (Japanese: ディスアピア)	Masahito Otani	Toshifumi Kawase	Heijūrō Kamiya; Yūji Yamaguchi	7 March 2005
49	"Fulzeam"; Transliteration: "Furuzeamu" (Japanese: フルゼアム)	Yoshinari Suzuki	Rika Nakase	Yoshinari Suzuki	14 March 2005
50	"Start Again"; Transliteration: "Sutāto agein" (Japanese: スタート・アゲイン)	Michita Shiraishi	Rika Nakase	Hibari Nakayama	21 March 2005
51	"Final Stage"; Transliteration: "Fainaru sutēji" (Japanese: ファイナル・ステージ)	Shunji Yoshida	Satoshi Namiki	Itsuro Kawasaki; Yūji Yamaguchi	28 March 2005
