= 一輝 =

一輝, a Japanese masculine given name meaning "one, bright", may refer to:

- Ikki (given name)
- Itsuki (given name)
- Kazuki (given name)
