= 一樹 =

一樹, meaning “one, tree”, is a masculine name, may refer to:

- Itsuki, Japanese masculine given name
- Kazuki, Japanese masculine given name
