= List of Rental Magica episodes =

The cover of the first DVD compilation released by Kadokawa featuring Itsuki Iba

Rental Magica (レンタルマギカ, Rentaru Magika) is a Japanese animated television series . Its episodes are directed by Itsuro Kawasaki and produced by the Japanese animation studio ZEXCS and Victor Entertainment. ZEXCS produced the animation and Victor Entertainment was responsible for developing the music. They are based on the light novel series Rental Magica by Makoto Sando and illustrated by pako, and adapt the source material over twenty-four episodes. The plot of the episodes follows Itsuki Iba, the newly appointed president of Astral, a company that dispatches magicians to perform jobs involving supernatural phenomena, and his interactions with his employees and Astral's competitors.

The episodes aired from October 7, 2007, to March 23, 2008, on Chiba TV and TV Saitama, with the episodes later broadcast on KBS Kyoto, Sun TV, Tokyo MX TV, TV Aichi, TV Hokkaido, TV Kanagawa, and TVQ Kyushu Broadcasting Co. The order that the episodes air in is nonlinear; for instance, the first episode broadcast is the sixth episode chronologically. The exceptions are episodes four, eight, and episodes sixteen through twenty, which are in the same broadcast and chronological order.

Four pieces of theme music are used for the episodes; two opening themes and two ending themes. The two opening themes are "Sora ni Saku" (宇宙に咲く) and "Faith"; both are by Lisa Komine. The ending themes are Jungo Yoshida's "Aruite Ikō" (歩いていこう.) and an a cappella version of "Aruite Ikō", sung by the Astral members' voice actors, used in episodes twelve and twenty-one. A single containing both opening themes was released on November 21, 2007, and a single for the closing themes was released on the same date.

Several DVD compilations have been released by Kadokawa. The compilations contain two episodes of the series, with the first four released on December 21, 2007, January 25, 2008, February 22, 2008, and March 21, 2008, respectively. The fifth compilation is set for release on April 25, 2008.

== Episode list ==
Note: B = episode number by broadcast order (nonlinear), C = episode number chronologically.

B	C	Title	Original release date
1	6	"Magic Users for Rental"; Transliteration: "Mahōtsukai, Kashimasu" (Japanese: 魔法使い, 貸します)	October 7, 2007
The members of Astral fail in their efforts to capture a demonic hound due to the incompetence of their president, Itsuki Iba, and the hound is claimed by Adelicia Lenn Mathers, the head of Goetia. Afterwards, Astral is approached by Shōko Kunugi, one of Itsuki's classmates from school, for a mission to find her missing grandfather. However, her grandfather, consumed by his magic after committing a magical taboo, attacks Itsuki and Kunugi. Astral members Honami Takase Ambler, Mikan Katsuragi, and Ren Nekoyashiki go to reinforce Itsuki. Itsuki reveals his Glamsight eye, and, under his orders, the Astral members defeat Kunugi's grandfather. At school later, Itsuki is approached by Adelicia and Honami, who bicker in the process. However, when Kunugi says hello to Itsuki, both Honami and Adelicia angrily punch Itsuki in the head.
2	1	"A Witch's Vow"; Transliteration: "Majo no Chikai" (Japanese: 魔女の誓い)	October 14, 2007
As the Astral members converse about dates and corresponding unluckiness, Itsuki complains about the responsibilities of becoming president. As he takes a walk from the city, he is confronted by Adelicia, who is incensed that he is unaware of Goetia, and uses her magic in an attempt to coerce Itsuki into pulling out of a bid. Honami stops her, and Adelicia retreats. Later, Nekoyashiki asks Itsuki to join Honami in dispelling a spell wave contamination. However, a mansion appears, and Honami recalls how in their youth, Itsuki saved her from a magical creature, changing his Glamsight in the process. Honami saves him from a Dullahan in the mansion, fulfilling her desire to protect Itsuki. At school, Adelicia arrives as a new student, much to Itsuki's embarrassment and Honami's chagrin.
3	7	"Purification of the Gods"; Transliteration: "Kamigami no Misogi" (Japanese: 神々の禊ぎ)	October 21, 2007
Itsuki arrives late for an appointment at a shrine due to allowing Mikan to buy souvenirs at a festival. Shinogi Minagi requests a saniwa, or spirit medium, to convene with Futsunushinokami, the god of the shrine, from Astral. Shinogi hopes to revive her comatose brother, Moroha Minagi. Although Adelicia and Honami are against Itsuki taking the job, he agrees after seeing Mikan's enthusiasm. However, as the ritual is being conducted, Kagezaki, a mage in the service of the Association arrives, telling Astral member Manami Kuroha of Takeminakatanokami, the other god of the shrine. He tells of the incident where Shinogi and Moroha accidentally summoned Takeminakatanokami. With Shinogi incapacitated, Moroha was forced to invoke Futsunushinokami's power to stop Takeminakatonokami, and the effort left him comatose. Mikan, with emotional support from Itsuki and magical assistance from Honami, manages to seal Takeminakatanokami, and Moroha awakens. On the train back, Kuroha teases Honami about arriving to save Itsuki.
4	4	"You are Not Alone"; Transliteration: "Hitori ja nai kara" (Japanese: ひとりじゃないから)	October 28, 2007
Itsuki is in the hospital with a broken leg, and he converses with Manami Kuroha, a ghost inhabiting the hospital. Kuroha is overjoyed that someone can talk with her and asks Itsuki about Astral and its activities. Meanwhile, Honami and Nekoyashiki investigate a source of magical pollution near the hospital. Nekoyashiki comes to Itsuki and explains magical contamination, dispelling a set of bloody hand prints in the process. Honami arrives and agrees with Nekoyashiki that the contamination is the result of a mage's spell. Elsewhere, Kuroha is consumed by a mass of flesh, which then attacks Itsuki, Honami and Nekoyashiki. They determine that the core of the pollution is a soul-eater, a mage who attempted to transfer his soul to obtain immortality. As Honami and Nekoyashiki prepare to destroy it and Kuroha in the process, Itsuki releases his Glamsight, and they manage to rescue Kuroha. A few days later, with the members of Astral present, Itsuki invites an ecstatic Kuroha into Astral.
5	2	"Magi Night"; Transliteration: "Magi Naito" (Japanese: 魔術の夜)	November 4, 2007
Due to the low amount of work Astral has shown since Itsuki took over, Kagezaki threatens to cancel Astral's registration with the Association. They are assigned to dispel a Magi Night, a case of high magical pollution. Goetia arrives as well, and summons a host of demons to attack Honami and Itsuki. Honami dispatches the demons but Adelicia arrives to do battle. However, the sea becomes turbulent and Adelicia and Itsuki are thrown into the sea as it freezes, trapping them. Below the surface, Adelicia reveals to Itsuki that the pollution's core is a Goetia mage that broke a taboo, and she swears Itsuki to secrecy. The mage is revealed to be Oswald Lenn Mathers, Adelicia's father. Oswald attacks Adelicia and Itsuki, but Honami arrives to save them. Oswald withdraws and Itsuki makes Honami promise not to reveal the taboo before fainting.
6	3	"Glamsight"; Transliteration: "Guramu Saito" (Japanese: 妖精眼)	November 11, 2007
Kagezaki confronts Adelicia over the suspicion that Goetia has broken a taboo, but Itsuki's intercession mollifies Kagezaki's suspicions. Itsuki forms an alliance with Adelicia to destroy her father. Outside, Honami apologizes to Itsuki for underestimating the magical pollution. Itsuki then asks her why she joined Astral, and she whispers to herself that it was because of Itsuki. The Magi Night is predicted to occur an amusement park. Beforehand, Adelicia tells Itsuki that she does not want to destroy her father, but rather protect his honour and dignity. Oswald arrives, defeating the assembled Astral members; however, Itsuki reveals his Glamsight and overwhelms Oswald, destroying him. Itsuki is then admitted to a hospital with a broken leg, and Adelicia lies down beside him. Outside, Honami and Nekoyashiki talk about the Glamsight's strengths and its dangers. Honami swears to protect Itsuki.
7	11	"Red-Headed Girl"; Transliteration: "Akai Kami no Shōjo" (Japanese: 赤い髪の少女)	November 18, 2007
Itsuki meets a girl in a park, and, seeing her alone, gives her food and a business card. She later goes to the Astral residence, asking for a basilisk eye, shocking the Astral members, but they accept when she offers a valuable antique. Astral proceeds to the basilisk's lair, where the basilisk manages to trap Lapis and Itsuki and subsequently overwhelms Mikan's protective charm. Itsuki reveals his Glamsight, and the Astral members dispatch the basilisk. Itsuki then collapses from the magical pollution, and Nekoyashiki barely manages to purify him before lasting damage is incurred. Later, Lapis arrives at Itsuki's bedside and an argument between Lapis and Mikan is interrupted by Honami, who reveals Lapis' identity as a homunculus, a mage's familiar. Lapis activates the basilisk eye and destroys the room. Nekoyashiki then surmises that Lapis is the familiar of Judaix Tholoide, one of the founders of Astral.
8	9	"Hot Spring Magic"; Transliteration: "Onsen Mahō" (Japanese: 温泉魔法)	November 25, 2007
The Astral members go to a hot spring in order to cure Itsuki's Glamsight eye, but Honami notes that the magic is too weak, and the spring must sit on a ley line to be fit for the purpose. As they travel up the mountainside, Kuroha suggests a competition to find a spring that sits atop the ley line. Honami and Adelicia refuse, but after both mentally note that they want Itsuki's exclusive affection as the prize, they eagerly begin. The group eventually falls into a hole, where they find a rock that is disrupting the magical flow of the ley line. Combining their abilities, they levitate the rock, enabling the hot spring to regain its power. As the members return to the hot spring, Honami and Adelicia's fight causes the fence between the men's and women's baths to break, embarrassing everyone.
9	12	"Father's Successor"; Transliteration: "Chichi o Tsugumono" (Japanese: 父を継ぐ者)	December 2, 2007
Adelicia raids Tholoide's lab, but is defeated by the alchemist and Lapis. Back in Japan, Kagezaki brings an item once owned by Tsukasa Iba, Itsuki's father, that the Association was holding for Itsuki, but reveals that Tholoide is disputing Itsuki's control of Astral. Itsuki and Honami go to a blimp to converse with Tholoide, whom speaks through Lapis. Tholoide concedes that Itsuki has a claim but suggests they hold a Fehde, a magical battle to determine ownership of Astral and the item left with the Association. After Tholoide induces Itsuki to compete by revealing Adelicia's failed raid attempt, Itsuki releases his Glamsight, and forces Lapis to flee. Later that evening, the Astral mansion is attacked by Lapis, and Nekoyashiki barely manages to ward off the initial attack. Honami flies from the mansion to confront Tholoide, but after he reveals that he is an automaton, he incapacitates her.
10	13	"Tears of the Homunculus"; Transliteration: "Homunkurusu no Namida" (Japanese: ホムンクルスの涙)	December 9, 2007
Lapis uses the basilisk eye to prevent Itsuki from using his Glamsight, but retreats after Adelicia arrives. Elsewhere, Honami awakens in Tholoide's lab surrounded by a barrier, and Tholoide reveals that the item the Association was holding was Tsukasa Iba's original grimoire. Itsuki plans an assault on Tholoide's headquarters, and Honami, realizing Itsuki will come, desperately tries to break free using a dangerous spell. Adelicia arrives and saves Honami from the collateral damage caused by the barrier's destruction. Itsuki confronts Tholoide, who easily defeats the Astral members with the basilisk eye he forcibly removes from Lapis. Honami and Adelicia arrive and Tholoide transforms Lapis into the basilisk. Using his Glamsight, Itsuki manages to defeat the basilisk and free Lapis. Itsuki tells Tholoide that, as president, he can only aspire to be the best he can. After they return to the mansion, Itsuki receives a letter from Lapis and Tholoide, who reveal that Itsuki can learn more about his Glamsight from Tsukasa's grimoire.
11	5	"The Flower that Blooms on the Dead"; Transliteration: "Shisha ni Saku Hana" (Japanese: 死者に咲く花)	December 16, 2007
Astral is approached by Diana, the president of Trismegistus, a corporation that sells magical items, to find a special flower that is seeded within a human body and blooms after their death. As the mission was originally taken by Itsuki's father, Itsuki accepts. However, they are attacked by Li Cheng Chen, a magician that can raise the dead. He tries to take the flower, but Honami takes it, escaping with Itsuki and leaving Kuroha behind. Itsuki resolves to save Kuroha and retain the flower for Diana. Elsewhere, Diana approaches Chen, regretful that she sold him the root for the flower, as he killed a village to seed it with power. Itsuki arrives, and Kuroha manifests her poltergeist powers to free herself from Chen's imprisonment. Itsuki reveals his Glamsight and he, Honami, and Kuroha defeat Chen. At the Astral mansion, Diana thanks Itsuki and while looking at his eye, comes close to his face. A scandalized Honami and Kuroha punch Itsuki after Diana leaves.
12	14	"A Requiem Offered on Christmas Eve"; Transliteration: "Seiya ni Sasageru Rekuiemu" (Japanese: 聖夜に捧げるレクイエム)	December 23, 2007
With all the Astral members busy, Itsuki goes into the city. Diana later comes to the Astral mansion, and tells Honami and Kuroha that Itsuki asked what girls liked for presents. Immediately intrigued, Honami runs into the city to find Itsuki. Meanwhile, Daphne, Adelicia's maid, reveals that Itsuki asked her the same question, and Adelicia runs to find Itsuki. She finds Honami and the two trail Itsuki into the city, where they find that Itsuki was getting a present for the ghost of a girl. Kuroha joins them and they go to a church, where they found the ghosts of a group of children that died in a fire. As a present, Itsuki, Honami, Adelicia, and Kuroha sing to them, and the church disappears with the ghosts. When they return to the mansion, the Astral members reveal that they've been planning a Christmas party for Itsuki. As they enjoy the party, Adelicia asks for Itsuki to stay with her the next day, and Honami angrily demands to be taken along.
13	10	"Faith Initiation Rites"; Transliteration: "Nyūshin Girei" (Japanese: 入信儀礼)	January 6, 2008
In a flashback, Honami recalls how she attended a wizarding school in Britain, and was widely considered a failure. Despite the criticism, she was fully committed to learning Celtic magic. Adelicia, also at the school, quickly gained the reputation of the brightest and strongest magician in the school. As their qualifying exam for the school, students were expected to survive in pairs in a site of magical pollution. Adelicia was paired with Honami, who refused to follow Adelicia's plan to destroy the source of the pollution and display her superiority. The two separate, but Honami saves Adelicia when she fails to destroy the source of the pollution, endangering the students present. With aid from Adelicia, Honami shows her skill with Celtic magic, and destroys the source. In the present, Adelicia is commenting on their schooling with Itsuki and Kuroha while reviewing old photos. Honami arrives and takes the two home, and when Itsuki asks her why she tried so hard at school, Honami thinks to herself it was because of Itsuki.
14	15	"Memories of the Stars"; Transliteration: "Hoshi no Kioku" (Japanese: 星のキオク)	January 13, 2008
Astral is contacted by Kei Isurugi, a member of the school of Onmyōdō that Nekoyashiki once attended, to perform a ceremony at a mountain. Itsuki accompanies Nekoyashiki and Mikan, but they are attacked by Kei during the ceremony. Kei remarks that he lost his sister, Sakuya Isurugi during a similar ceremony three years prior because Nekoyashiki left the school at the time to take Mikan to Astral. Nekoyashiki challenges Kei to a personal duel, and Itsuki upholds this, stopping the arriving Honami and Adelicia from interfering. Despite Kei's use of kuda-gitsune, Nekoyashiki manages to defeat him, with Kei pleased that he was able to pose some level of challenge for Nekoyashiki, his idol at the school. As Kei lies in defeat, Nekoyashiki reminisces on his last experience with Sakuya as the group watches an aurora in the sky.
15	8	"Legend of the Mermaid"; Transliteration: "Ningyo no Densetsu" (Japanese: 人魚の伝説)	January 20, 2008
Shinogi and Moroha Minagi request that the Astral members return a funadama they found to a shrine on a beach. When Itsuki and Kuroha attempt to return it, they are sucked into the past due to the magical pollution in the area. They meet a fisherman, Hyōdō, who explains that he has been attempting to find a mermaid due to the miraculous healing abilities their flesh gives when it is consumed. In the present, Honami, Adelicia, Mikan, and Nekoyashiki are told the legend of the mermaids from an old woman, who recounts that mermaids return to eat those that consumed them. Itsuki and Kuroha are subsequently attacked, and Kuroha manages to call upon the spirit of Hyōdō's daughter, which materializes in a funadama, causing the mermaids to chase after it instead, and Itsuki and Kuroha return to their own time. Later, Shinogi recounts that the shrine is being worshipped again, and Itsuki realizes it is likely one of Hyōdō's descendants.
16	16	"Red Spear"; Transliteration: "Akai Yari" (Japanese: 赤い槍)	January 27, 2008
While training in the mountains, Itsuki is attacked by a larva, a magical creature that makes nightmares reality, and is saved by Sekiren, a traveling member of Astral. On Itsuki's request, Sekiren trains him in martial arts. In a break in training, Sekiren visits Astral and asks Nekoyashiki to allow him to take on a mission offered to Astral. Kuroha takes tea to Itsuki, who claims that he is training so that others can rely on him. Magical pollution appears on the mountain, and Kuroha leaves to seek help, but after she and Honami return, Sekiren stops them. Meanwhile, Itsuki is attacked by the larva in the form of an armored soldier, and using Sekiren's training, is able to defeat it without using his Glamsight. Afterwards, Sekiren reveals he set up the conflict for Itsuki's benefit, and advises him to fight with his Glamsight rather than have it control him.
17	17	"Demonic Rebellion"; Transliteration: "Majin no Hanran" (Japanese: 魔神の反乱)	February 3, 2008
A Goetia ceremony to summon the demon Asmodai fails due to the interference of a former member, Clive Roland, once a disciple of Adelicia's father. Adelicia goes missing as a result and Daphne visits Itsuki during one of his training sessions with Sekiren to find out where Adelicia is. That evening, Itsuki is attacked by Clive, who uses Adelicia's demons, but retreats after Adelicia arrives. Adelicia reveals that she returned to England to summon Asmodai, one of the four great demons that control the other demons of the Ars Goetia, but was interrupted by Clive, who intends to summon Asmodai. Itsuki and Adelicia arrive too late to stop Clive from summoning Asmodai, but Asmodai kills Clive and begins attacking Itsuki and Adelicia. Itsuki is able to use Sekiren's Xingyiquan to defend against Asmodai while Adelicia sacrifices her "future" to gain control over the demon. Afterwards, Adelicia tells Itsuki that sacrificing her "future" meant devoting the rest of her life to magic.
18	18	"The Bond of Solomon"; Transliteration: "Soromon no Kizuna" (Japanese: ソロモンの絆)	February 10, 2008
Daphne begins searching for Clive in order to find Adelicia, meeting Gara, Goetia's secretary, in the city. Gara is not aware of Clive's location, but after he leaves, Sekiren appears, and Daphne attacks him. Sekiren explains he wishes to help Daphne with her search, and after witnessing Daphne's abilities, questions why she lowered herself to being Adelicia's servant. Daphne replies that she is content to be Adelicia's servant, although she is embarrassed when Sekiren declares his love for her. The two eventually find Clive dead, and confront Gara over killing him. Gara uses forbidden techniques to fuse with a demon, causing Sekiren to realize that he is part of Ophion, an organization of mages that do not follow magical taboos. Sekiren defeats Gara and forces him to retreat. Afterwards, he tells Daphne of his association with Oswald Mathers, notes Daphne is Adelicia's sister, giving up her former blond hair and green eyes to do so, and falls asleep in the grass while proclaiming his love to her again.
19	19	"The Medium's Hometown"; Transliteration: "Fujo no Kokyō" (Japanese: 巫女の故郷)	February 17, 2008
Mikan and Nekoyashiki return to Mikan's family, and their extended absence causes Itsuki to inquire as to their status. Suzuka Katsuragi, the head of the family and Mikan's grandmother, refuses to return Mikan to Astral, and reveals that Nekoyashiki has been missing. Itsuki and Honami travel to the Katsuragi estate, where Suzuka offers to consider returning Mikan if Astral eliminates an oni on the mountain. Along with their guide, Tatsumi Shitō, they travel up the mountain to an area where dozens of oni attack them. The three are ultimately engulfed by the magical pollution present, and Itsuki awakens to find Nekoyashiki with Mikan's missing sister, Kaori Katsuragi. Nekoyashiki and Kaori explain that the ritual the Katsuragi are performing places the oni of the mountain into the next family heir, killing them, and Suzuka wishes this to be done to Mikan. Nekoyashiki claims he kidnapped Kaori to prevent the ritual from occurring, but due to a trace placed on Itsuki revealing Kaori's location, Suzuka begins the ritual.
20	20	"Demonic Festival"; Transliteration: "Oni no Matsuri" (Japanese: 鬼の祭り)	February 24, 2008
The oni traps Kaori and is subsequently trapped in the Katsuragi ceremony; however, Kaori receives severe pain when the Katsuragi clan members remove one of the oni's horns. Suzuka calls Mikan to be a sacrifice, but the oni breaks free of the ritual. Itsuki, Honami, Nekoyashiki, and Tatsumi arrive and offer to combat the oni, which Suzuka agrees to, although she dismisses any possibility of victory. Using his Glamsight, Itsuki directs Honami in sealing the oni's movement while Mikan and Kaori complete the Katsuragi ceremony. The oni's remaining horn enables him to halt the ritual, but Adelicia arrives, removing the remaining horn with one of her summoned demons. Mikan and Kaori complete the ritual and cause the oni to vanish. Impressed with their feat, Suzuka allows Mikan to return to Astral and requests that Itsuki take good care of her.
21	24	"White and Black Dress"; Transliteration: "Shiro to Kuro no Doresu" (Japanese: 白と黒のドレス)	March 2, 2008
Adelicia is forced by the Association to either appoint a new head of Goetia or marry to legitimize her claim. To resolve this, she offers a marriage proposal to Honami. She explains to a bewildered Itsuki that they will only be married as mages, which does not have the same weight as an actual marriage. With aid from Diana, Adelicia and Honami pick out the clothing and jewelry for their wedding while a disgruntled Itsuki accompanies them. At the marriage ceremony, Daphne administers the rites, but before the final stages are concluded, Itsuki takes both Adelicia and Honami and leaves the church. He explains to both of them that he realized that both did not have their hearts in the ceremony, and were doing it against their wishes. Adelicia subsequently contacts the Association to inform them that the marriage is canceled, and she and Honami throw their rings into the river, which Itsuki is later forced to retrieve.
22	21	"Sleeping City"; Transliteration: "Nemureru Machi" (Japanese: 眠れる街)	March 9, 2008
Sekiren becomes concerned of after seeing the erosion of a Buddhist idol, and begins going through the city. Meanwhile, Itsuki and Adelicia are enjoying a meal, and see a boy saving Genbu, one of Nekoyashiki's cats, stuck in a tree. They aid him and return to the Astral mansion, where the boy reveals he is Fin Cruda, a member of the Association assigned to oversee Astral. Fin voices the Association's suspicions that Astral is breaking a taboo, but leaves after seeing Honami, his former student. Itsuki follows Fin and the two discuss Itsuki's Glamsight. After Fin leaves, Itsuki's Glamsight begins to cause him pain, and the city becomes covered in mist. Sekiren arrives, noting that the seals on a dragon in the city have been broken. Itsuki, realizing Fin is behind this, leaves to confront him. In the city, Honami is aiding Fin in summoning the dragon, believing it can heal Itsuki's Glamsight.
23	22	"Changeling"; Transliteration: "Chenjiringu" (Japanese: 取り替え児)	March 16, 2008
Honami travels throughout the city, writing runes in her blood for the dragon summoning ceremony. Nekoyashiki explains to the remaining Astral members that Itsuki's father, Tsukasa Iba, chose for Astral's headquarters to be in the city in order to keep watch over the dragon, and he casts a spell to retrieve Honami and Itsuki. Elsewhere, Adelicia confronts Fin, who overwhelms her with his magic. Itsuki and Sekiren arrive and Fin quickly disables the latter. Fin reveals that he is a changeling and possesses the Glamsight, which knocks Itsuki unconscious. Nekoyakishi's spell reaches Itsuki, Sekiren, and Adelicia, but Fin disrupts it, causing the spell to leave Itsuki behind. Honami and Fin take Itsuki to a tower, where they begin to summon the dragon. Nekoyakishi surmises the dragon is a sacrifice to heal Itsuki's eye, and that Honami feels guilt over exposing Itsuki's Glamsight to damage from the dragon when they were traveling in a mansion as children.
24	23	"Astral"; Transliteration: "Asutoraru" (Japanese: アストラル)	March 23, 2008
The members of Astral go to the tower, and are confronted by the dragon. Sekiren, Mikan, and Kuroha begin to battle it, and the others continue into the tower. Nekoyashiki arrives first, but is stopped by Fin's and Honami's combined efforts. Adelicia enters the battle and summons Asmodai, her most powerful demon, and Honami responds with one of her most powerful spells. Nekoyashiki stops the confrontation to prevent the area from being destroyed from the accumulation of energy. Itsuki awakens, revealing his Glamsight and admitting to Honami that he does not blame her for their childhood incident with the dragon. Itsuki and Fin battle, and as Fin conjures an unblockable attack, Honami betrays him, declaring her love for Itsuki. The Association members, headed by Kagezaki, begin to arrive on the scene, and Fin retreats. Due to Fin's betrayal of the Association and a lack of evidence against Astral, the Association acquits Astral of any wrongdoing. Afterwards, Itsuki and Honami go to see the dragon before it is sealed, and upon its request, Itsuki names it "Astral."

== See also ==
- List of The Melancholy of Haruhi Suzumiya episodes — another anime series with a nonlinear episode order
- List of Hidamari Sketch episodes — a third anime series with a nonlinear episode order
