= Kazuki =

Origin
- Origin: Japanese
- Meaning: different meanings depending on the kanji used

Kazuki (written: 一樹, 一起, 一輝, 一貴, 一希, 和樹, 和記, 和基, 和希 or かずき in hiragana) is a masculine Japanese given name. Notable people with the name include:

- Kazuki (wrestler) (藤原和子, born 1975), Japanese wrestler
- Kazuki Akane (赤根 和樹; born 1962), Japanese anime director
- Kazuki Ganaha (我那覇 和樹; born 1980), Japanese footballer
- Kazuki Futami (二見 一樹; born 1985), Japanese actor
- Kazuki Hara (原 一樹; born 1985), Japanese footballer
- Kazuki Hashioka (橋岡 和樹; born 1997), Japanese footballer
- Kazuki Inoue (井上 一樹; born 1971), Japanese baseball player
- Kazuki Kato (加藤 和樹; born 1984), Japanese actor and singer
- Kazuki Kimura (木村 一基; born 1973), Japanese shogi player
- Kazuki Kitamura (北村 一輝; born 1969), Japanese actor
- Kazuki Kohinata (小日向 一輝; born 1994), Japanese swimmer
- Kazuki Masaki (真崎 一輝; born 2000), Japanese motorcycle racer
- Kazuki Nakajima (中嶋 一貴; born 1985), Japanese racing driver
- Kazuki Nishishita (西下 和記; born 1981), Japanese ski jumper
- Kazuki Ōmori (大森 一樹; 1952–2022), Japanese film director and screenwriter
- Kazuki Ōtake (大竹 一樹; born 1967), Japanese comedian
- Kazuki Saito (齊藤 和樹; born 1988), Japanese footballer
- Kazuki Sato (footballer, born 1974) (佐藤 一樹), Japanese footballer
- Kazuki Sato (footballer, born 1993) (佐藤 和樹), Japanese footballer
- Kazuki Shimizu (清水 一希; born 1990), Japanese actor
- Kazuki Takahashi (高橋 和希; 1961–2022), Japanese manga artist and game creator
- Kazuki Tanaka (baseball) (田中 和基; born 1994), Japanese baseball player
- Kazuki Tanaka (footballer) (田中 和樹; born 2000), Japanese footballer
- Kazuki Tokudome (徳留 一樹; born 1987), Japanese mixed martial artist
- Kazuki Tomokawa (友川 かずき; born 1950), Japanese musician
- Kazuki Tomono (友野一希; born 1998), Japanese figure skater
- Ura Kazuki (宇良 和輝; born 1992), Japanese sumo wrestler
- Kazuki Watanabe (disambiguation), multiple people
- Kazuki Yamada (山田 和樹; born 1979), Japanese conductor
- Kazuki Yamaguchi (disambiguation), multiple people
- Kazuki Yao (矢尾 一樹; born 1959), Japanese voice actor and actor
- Kazuki Yazawa (born 1989), Japanese slalom canoeist
- Kazuki Yoshimi (吉見 一起; born 1984), Japanese baseball player
- Kazuki Yoshinaga (吉永 一貴; born 1999), Japanese speed skater
- Chiyomaru Kazuki (千代丸 一樹; born 1991), Japanese sumo wrestlerr
- Kazuki (XaaXaa) (一葵), Japanese singer

== Fictional characters ==
- Kazuki Kasen, fictional character in the video game Grand Theft Auto Liberty City Stories
- Kazuki Kazama, a character in the video game Samurai Shodown
- Kazuki Komon, the main character of Ultraman Nexus
- Kazuki Fujisawa, a supporting character in The Pet Girl of Sakurasou
- Kazuki Fuse, protagonist of the anime film Jin-Roh: The Wolf Brigade
- Kazuki Shimada, a supporting character in A Silent Voice
- Kazuki Muto (武藤 カズキ), protagonist of the manga series Buso Renkin
- Kazuki Takemura, protagonist of the video game Front Mission 3
