= Ikki (given name) =

- Gender: Male

Origin
- Origin: Japanese
- Meaning: Different meanings depending on the kanji used

Ikki (written: 一輝, 一樹 or 一騎) is a masculine Japanese given name. Notable people with the name include:

- Ikki Kajiwara (梶原 一騎; 1936–1987), Japanese writer and film producer
- Ikki Kita (北 一輝; 1883–1937), Japanese intellectual
- Ikki Sasaki (佐々木 一輝; born 1991), Japanese footballer
- Ikki Sawamura (沢村 一樹; born 1967), Japanese model and actor
- Ikki Shimamura (嶋村 一輝; born 1981), Japanese baseball player

== Fictional characters ==
- Ikki, a character from the animated television series The Legend of Korra
- Ikki Kurogane (黒鉄 一輝), protagonist of the light novel series Chivalry of a Failed Knight
- Ikki Tenryou (天領 イッキ), a character in the Medabots franchise
- Ikki Igarashi (五十嵐 一輝), one of the main characters in Kamen Rider Revice
- Phoenix Ikki, a main character from the Saint Seiya series.
