= Itsuki =

- Pronunciation: Í-ts(ú)-kí
- Gender: Unisex
- Language: Japanese

Origin
- Meaning: It can have many different meanings depending on the kanji used.

Itsuki (いつき, イツキ) is a Japanese given name, which can also be used as a surname.

== Written forms ==
Itsuki can be written using different kanji characters and can mean:

- 一樹, "one tree"
- 樹, "tree"
- 斎, "servant of God (Shinto)"
- 維月, "fiber moon"
- 伊月, "that one moon"

as a surname

- 五木, "five trees"

The given name can also be written in hiragana or katakana.

== People ==
=== Given name ===
- Itsuki Aoki (青木いつ希; born 1997), ring name by Aika Aoki, Japanese wrestler
- Itsuki Asai (浅井 樹; born 1971), Japanese baseball player
- Itsuki Enomoto (榎本 樹; born 2000), Japanese footballer
- Itsuki Hirata (平田 樹; born 1999), Japanese mixed martial artist
- Itsuki Sagara (相楽 樹, born 1995), Japanese actress
- Itsuki Shoda (正田 樹, born 1981), Japanese professional baseball player
- Itsuki Someno (染野 唯月, born 2001), Japanese professional footballer
- Itsuki Toyama (外山 斎, born 1976), Japanese politician
- Itsuki Oda (小田 逸稀, born 1998), Japanese football
- Itsuki Urata (浦田 樹; born 1997), Japanese footballer
- Itsuki Yamada (山田 樹; born 1990), Japanese footballer
- Itsuki Yamada (山田 樹), Japanese footballer
- Itsuki Yamazaki (山崎 五紀), a Japanese female professional wrestler

=== Surname ===
- Hironori Itsuki (born 1940), Japanese rower
- Hiroshi Itsuki (五木 ひろし, born 1948), Japanese enka singer
- Hiroyuki Itsuki (五木 寛之, born 1932), Japanese novelist
- Natsumi Itsuki (樹 なつみ, born 1960), Japanese shōjo manga artist
- Yui Itsuki (伊月 ゆい), Japanese voice actress

== Characters ==
=== Given name ===
- Itsuki Akiba (秋葉 いつき), a character in romance manga I"s
- Itsuki Fujii (樹), a character in the 1995 Japanese film Love Letter
- Itsuki Iba (いつき), a character in the light novel series Rental Magica
- Itsuki Inubouzaki, a character in Yuuki Yuuna wa Yuusha de Aru
- Itsuki Katagiri, a character in the anime and game Dream Festival!
- Itsuki Koizumi (一樹), a character in the Haruhi Suzumiya series
- Itsuki Kusunoki, a character in Natsunagu!
- Itsuki Marude, a character in the manga Tokyo Ghoul
- Itsuki Midoriba (樹), a character in the visual novel Shuffle!
- Itsuki Minami (樹), the primary protagonist of the manga and anime Air Gear
- Itsuki Myoudouin, a character in the anime series HeartCatch PreCure!
- Itsuki Nakano, a character in The Quintessential Quintuplets
- Itsuki Onra, a character in Inazuma Eleven
- Itsuki Takeuchi (武内 樹), a character in the manga and anime series Initial D and MF Ghost
- Itsuki Akazawa a character in light novel anime series The angel next door spoils me rotten

=== Surname ===
- Mamoru Itsuki (一樹), a main character in the survival horror video game Forbidden Siren 2
- Marehiko Itsuki, a character in the manga series The Prince of Tennis
- Ranru Itsuki, a character in Bakuryuu Sentai Abaranger.

== See also ==
- Itsuki Lullaby, a folk song representative of Kyūshū, Japan
- Itsuki, Kumamoto, Japan
