= Kazuki Yamaguchi =

Kazuki Yamaguchi may refer to:

- Kazuki Yamaguchi (footballer, born 1986) (山口 和樹), Japanese footballer
- Kazuki Yamaguchi (footballer, born 1995) (山口 和樹), Japanese footballer
