= Kazuki Watanabe =

Kazuki Watanabe may refer to:

- Kazuki Watanabe (musician) (1981–2000), Japanese musician with the band Raphael
- Kazuki Watanabe (swimmer) (born 1987), Japanese swimmer
- Kazuki Watanabe (motorcyclist) (born 1990), Grand Prix motorcycle racer from Japan
- Kazuki Watanabe (actor) (born 1985), Japanese actor
