= List of Hidamari Sketch episodes =

The cover of the DVD box set compilation of the first season of Hidamari Sketch released by Section23 Films on January 12, 2010, featuring (front-to-back) Yuno, Miyako, Hiro and Sae

The Hidamari Sketch anime television series is based on the four panel manga of the same name written and illustrated by Ume Aoki. Directed by Akiyuki Shinbo and Ryōki Kamitsubo and produced by the animation studio Shaft, 12 episodes aired in Japan between January and March 2007; two additional special episodes aired back-to-back in October 2007. The story follows the daily lives of four girls—Yuno, Miyako, Hiro and Sae—attending Yamabuki Art High School and who live in the Hidamari Apartment building across the street from the school. They are later joined by two others who start living at the apartment building—Nazuna and Nori—after one year has passed in the series' internal chronology.

A second season titled Hidamari Sketch × 365 aired 13 episodes between July and September 2008. An original video animation (OVA) episode for 365 was released in March 2009, and two additional special episodes aired in October 2009. A third season titled Hidamari Sketch × Hoshimittsu aired 12 episodes between January and March 2010; two special episodes aired in October 2010. A two-episode miniseries, Hidamari Sketch x SP, aired between October and November 2011. A fourth anime season, Hidamari Sketch x Honeycomb, aired 12 episodes between October and December 2012. An OVA titled Hidamari Sketch: Sae & Hiro's Graduation Arc was released in November 2013.

The episodes of Hidamari Sketch were aired in an anachronic order with each episode taking place in a different month in the year; chronologically, the story begins in April. Episodes three and seven are the two episodes not out of order. The DVDs retained the anachronic ordering of events. This theme continues with Hidamari Sketch × 365, featuring events before, after, and between the first season's episodes. In Hidamari Sketch × Hoshimittsu, events set during Yuno's second year are told in chronological order, while events from the previous year retain the anachronic nature of the previous series. Hidamari Sketch x Honeycomb sticks to a mainly chronological order.

== Overview ==
The first season of Hidamari Sketch was produced by Shaft and directed by Akiyuki Shinbo and Ryōki Kamitsubo. Yoshiaki Itou was the character designer, who based the designs on Aoki's original concept, and the screenplay was written by Nahoko Hasegawa. Composed by Tomoki Kikuya, the music was produced by Lantis with Toshiki Kameyama as the sound director. The series includes 12 episodes aired in Japan between January 12 and March 30, 2007, on the TBS television network. Two additional special episodes aired back-to-back on the same network on October 19, 2007.

A second season titled Hidamari Sketch × 365, directed by Akiyuki Shinbo and produced by Shaft, aired 13 episodes in Japan between July 4 and September 26, 2008, on TBS. An original video animation (OVA) episode for 365 was included on the seventh and final DVD compilation volume released on March 25, 2009. Two additional special episodes aired on the same network on October 18 and October 25, 2009. While character design and music director did not change, Nahoko Hasegawa was joined by Natsue Yoguchi on writing the screenplay for 365. A third season titled Hidamari Sketch × Hoshimittsu, directed by Akiyuki Shinbo and Ken'ichi Ishikura and produced by Shaft, aired 12 episodes in Japan between January 8 and March 25, 2010, on TBS. Two special episodes for the third season aired on the same network on October 24 and October 31, 2010. A two-episode miniseries, Hidamari Sketch x SP, aired on October 29, 2011, and November 5, 2011. A fourth anime season, Hidamari Sketch x Honeycomb, aired 12 episodes between October 5 and December 21, 2012. An OVA, titled Hidamari Sketch: Sae & Hiro's Graduation Arc (ひだまりスケッチ 沙英・ヒロ 卒業編, Hidamari Suketchi: Sae Hiro Sotsugyō-hen), will be released on Blu-ray Disc and DVD on November 27, 2013.

The episodes of Hidamari Sketch were released by Aniplex in six Region 2 DVD compilation volumes between March 28 and August 22, 2007, in Japan in limited and regular editions. A single DVD volume containing the two special episodes for Hidamari Sketch was released on October 24, 2007. The episodes of Hidamari Sketch × 365 were released by Aniplex in seven DVD compilation volumes between September 24, 2008, and March 25, 2009, in Japan in limited and regular editions. A single DVD volume containing the two special episodes for 365 was released on October 28, 2009. The episodes of Hidamari Sketch × Hoshimittsu were released by Aniplex in six BD and DVD compilation volumes between March 24 and August 25, 2010, in Japan in limited and regular editions. A single BD/DVD volume containing the two special episodes for Hoshimitsu was released on October 27, 2011. A single BD/DVD volume containing the two episodes for SP was released on November 23, 2011. The episodes of Hidamari Sketch × Honeycomb were released by Aniplex in five BD and DVD compilation volumes between December 26, 2012, and April 24, 2013, in Japan in limited and regular editions.

The first season of Hidamari Sketch was licensed in North America by Sentai Filmworks and distributed by Section23 Films; a 14-episode DVD box set collection of Hidamari Sketch, including the two special episodes, was released with English subtitles on January 12, 2010. Hidamari Sketch × 365 was also licensed by Sentai Filmworks, with Section23 Films as distributor; a 16-episode DVD box set collection of 365, including the OVA and two special episodes, was released with English subtitles on April 6, 2010. Both seasons are on the Anime Network's online player.

Two pieces of theme music are used for each season: one opening theme sung by Kana Asumi, Kaori Mizuhashi, Yūko Gotō, and Ryōko Shintani, and one ending theme by Marble. For Hidamari Sketch, the opening theme is "Sketch Switch" (スケッチスイッチ, Suketchi Suitchi) and the ending theme is "Mebae Drive" (芽生えドライブ, Mebae Doraibu; Bud Drive). For Hidamari Sketch × 365, the opening theme is "Hatena de Wasshoi" (?でわっしょい, Hooray for Something) and the ending theme is "Ryūsei Record" (流星レコード, Ryūsei Rekōdo; Meteor Record). For Hidamari Sketch × Hoshimittsu, the opening theme is "Dekiru Kanatte Hoshimittsu" (できるかなって☆☆☆, You Can Do It, Three Stars) and the ending theme is "Sakura Sakura Saku: Ano Hi Kimi o Matsu, Sora to Onaji de" (さくらさくら咲く ～あの日君を待つ 空と同じで～, The Cherry Blossoms Bloom: The Day I Waited For You, Under the Same Sky). For Hidamari Sketch x SP, the opening theme is "Kimagure, Jan Ken Pon!" (気まぐれ、じゃんけんポンっ!, Whimsical, Rock Paper Scissors!) and the ending theme is "Nora". For Hidamari Sketch x Honeycomb, the opening theme is "Open Canvas" (おーぷん☆きゃんばす, Ōpun Kyanbasu) by Asumi, Mizuhashi, Shintani, Goto, Chiaki Omigawa, and Hitomi Harada; the ending theme is "Yume Gumo" (夢ぐも, Dream Cloud) by Marble.

== Hidamari Sketch ==
No.	Title	Directed by (Note: Information is taken from the ending credits of each episode.)	Written by	Storyboarded by	Original release date
1	"January 11: Winter Collage"; Transliteration: "Ichi-gatsu Jū-ichi-nichi: Fuyu no Korāju" (Japanese: 1月11日 冬のコラージュ)	Ryouki Kamitsubo	Nahoko Hasegawa	Ryouki Kamitsubo	January 12, 2007
Yuno had forgotten to do her homework in time for Yoshinoya's class and has to finish it during lunch break. After school, Yuno and Miyako play in the snow for a while and later visit Hiro's apartment so Yuno can thank her for the rice ball Hiro gave her for lunch.
2	"August 21: Japan's Summer"; Transliteration: "Hachi-gatsu Ni-jū-ichi-nichi: Nippon no Natsu" (Japanese: 8月21日 ニッポンの夏)	Tatsuya Oishi	Rima Kitaki	Tatsuya Oishi	January 19, 2007
Yuno and her friends have been given the task to create a new sign for the Hidamari Apartments, and they set to divide the work equally. Afterwards it is discovered that Miyako's rent is much lower than the others have to pay, and Sae goes to the landlord to discover why. That night, the summer festival starts and Yuno and her friends go and have fun.
3	"June 17: ...or an Indian"; Transliteration: "Roku-gatsu Jū-shichi-nichi: Mata wa Indo-jin" (Japanese: 6月17日 またはインド人)	Kenichi Ishikura	Masashi Kubota	Shouji Saeki	January 26, 2007
Yoshinoya starts her class with her trying to get her students to sketch her in various outfits, but after some intervention from the principal, they settle on sketching a bust of Brutus. Later that day, the four main characters get together in Miyako's leaky apartment.
4	"May 18: The Singing Shortcake"; Transliteration: "Go-gatsu Jū-hachi-nichi: Utau Shōto Kēki" (Japanese: 5月18日 歌うショートケーキ)	Yoshihiro Mori	Nahoko Hasegawa	Jirou Fujimoto; Akiyuki Shinbo (Note: Credited as Futoshi Shiiya (椎谷太志).)	February 2, 2007
Today at school, Yuno and Miyako get to go outside during class to sketch something due to the weather being nice that day. Later, Yuno and her friends go to a karaoke bar where Hiro is determined to lose some weight while singing.
5	"February 13: Heart and Body"; Transliteration: "Ni-gatsu Jū-san-nichi: Kokoro to Karada" (Japanese: 2月13日 こころとからだ)	Ryouki Kamitsubo	Nahoko Hasegawa	Akiyuki Shinbo	February 9, 2007
Yuno comes down with a cold and has to stay home for the day. While asleep in her apartment, Yuno has several odd dreams of school and of her friends. Meanwhile, Yuno's friends do all they can to help her get better.
6	"July 14: Cool and Comfy"; Transliteration: "Shichi-gatsu Jū-yokka: Hinyari Mattari" (Japanese: 7月14日 ひんやり·まったり)	Hideyuki Yoshida	Masashi Kubota	Kazunori Mizuno	February 16, 2007
Summer has arrived, and once final exams are over, Yuno and her friends enjoy the beginning of their summer vacation. Due to Yuno not knowing how to swim, Miyako gets out an inflatable pool that Yuno and her friends play in, though they eventually go to the beach.
7	"October 12: Stormy Drying Agent"; Transliteration: "Jū-gatsu Jū-ni-nichi: Arashi no Kansōzai" (Japanese: 10月12日 嵐ノ乾燥剤)	Masayuki Iimura	Natsue Yoguchi	Kazuhiro Takamura	February 23, 2007
A typhoon hits during the day of the Sports Festival and has to be called off until the next day when the typhoon has already blown over. Later on, Yuno and her friends are in Miyako's room worried that if the drying agents under her floor get wet they will ignite and catch the building on fire. Miyako gets the idea to remove them all, and throws one into the rain outside, but it does not catch fire.
8	"March 13: 3% of Hope"; Transliteration: "San-gatsu Jū-san-nichi San-pāsento no Kibō" (Japanese: 3月13日 3%の希望)	Masayuki Iimura	Natsue Yoguchi	Jirou Fujimoto	March 2, 2007
Yuno and her friends have a day off from school today, and after waking up, Yuno starts to draw. Miyako arrives soon after and sits down with Yuno as they draw various things together. Yuno gets a text message from Sae to come to her apartment from the back way; Miyako jumps off the second story to get there, followed by a terrified Yuno. They find out that Sae is hiding from her editor as she tries to finish her next novel before the deadline.
9	"September 4: The Wolf of the Shinjuku Back Streets"; Transliteration: "Ku-gatsu Yokka Ura-Shinjuku no Ōkami" (Japanese: 9月4日 裏新宿の狼)	Kenichi Ishikura	Masashi Kubota	Kenichi Ishikura	March 9, 2007
Yuno and Miyako wake up early in the morning and as they are leaving the apartment building, Yuno spots an envelope on the ground. She notices a man not too far away and it turns out he had dropped it. To show his thanks, he gives Yuno four lottery tickets which were in the envelope. At school, a former student of Yoshinoya comes in to talk to Yuno's class, and Yuno starts wondering about her future dreams as an artist. Near the end of the day, Sae buys the evening paper to check the numbers on the lottery tickets, but no one is a winner.
10	"November 3: Her Highness Yuno"; Transliteration: "Jū-ichi-gatsu Mikka Yuno-sama" (Japanese: 11月3日 ゆのさま)	Tatsuya Oishi	Natsue Yoguchi	Akiyuki Shinbo	March 16, 2007
The cultural festival is going on at Yuno's school, but the night before, Yuno had tried to finish a piece for the art gallery but ended up falling asleep before it was finished; Miyako took the painting and put it in the gallery by the time Yuno woke up. At school, Yuno gets praise for her unfinished painting even though she did not intend it to be this way and Yuno's friends all have parts in plays. Later, Yuno and her friends go to a public bathhouse and talk about the festival.
11	"April 28: A Round Cabbage"; Transliteration: "Shi-gatsu Ni-jū-hachi-nichi Māru Kyabetsu" (Japanese: 4月28日 まーるキャベツ)	Yoshihiro Mori	Masashi Kubota	Yoshihiro Mori	March 23, 2007
Yuno and her friends go to the zoo for a school assignment to sketch some of the animals. Yoshinoya dresses up like a tour guide and acts like one on the way to the zoo by pointing things outside the window to the students, but soon becomes very carsick and has to stop. At the zoo, Yuno and her friends go around and see many of the animals. Later, Yoshinoya ends up in front of the Hidamari Apartments, and Yuno and her friends take her to Hiro's apartment when she rests for a time. After she leaves, they discuss some of the rumors they have heard about Yoshinoya.
12	"December 25: Goodbye Ume-Sensei"; Transliteration: "Jū-ni-gatsu Ni-jū-go-nichi Sayonara Ume-sensei" (Japanese: 12月25日 サヨナラうめ先生)	Masayuki Iimura	Nahoko Hasegawa	Ryouki Kamitsubo; Akiyuki Shinbo	March 30, 2007
On Christmas Eve, Sae's younger sister Chika comes to visit and gets to meet Yuno, Miyako, and Hiro too. They show Chika around Yuno's school, and they run into Yoshinoya there who later swings by in a Santa outfit and wishes them Merry Christmas. Chika later comes to Yuno's apartment in the middle of the night after Sae refused to give Chika her autograph. Sae, Miyako, and Hiro come by too and they stay up late into the night. On Christmas day, Chika oversleeps and leaves quickly to meet someone in a neighboring town. Yuno and her friends spend the rest of the day together.

=== Specials ===
No.	Title	Directed by	Written by	Storyboarded by	Original release date
1	"August 11: And Now Returning to the Original Place"; Transliteration: "Hachi-gatsu Jū-ichi-nichi Soshite Moto no Ichi ni Modosu" (Japanese: 8月11日 そして元の位置に戻す)	Masayuki Iimura	Nahoko Hasegawa	Akiyuki Shinbo (Note: Credited as Souji Homura (帆村壮二).)	October 19, 2007
In a hot summer day, after receiving a watermelon from the Hidamari landlady, Yuno and her friends make a visit to a local swimming pool, where Yuno's inability to swim and fear of water is revealed. Meanwhile, Yoshinoya, the Hidamari landlady, and the Principal spend their time together in a school swimming pool.
2	"November 27: Is Love in the Air?"; Transliteration: "Jū-ichi-gatsu Ni-jū-shichi-nichi Soko ni Ai wa Aru no Ka?" (Japanese: 11月27日 そこに愛はあるのか?)	Ryouki Kamitsubo	Nahoko Hasegawa	Ryouki Kamitsubo	October 19, 2007
To Yuno, Miyako, and Sae's surprise, Hiro receives a love letter from a third-year upperclassman. The sender wants to confess his love on the rooftop during lunch-break. Hiro's friends can hardly concentrate on the classes as they are very curious about the love letter. After school, Hiro reveals that she already rejected the boy in the mid-morning via a note she had sent to him. Hiro's friends are disappointed, but look up to her for her maturity.
3	"August 26: Super Hidamatsuri"; Transliteration: "Hachi-gatsu Ni-jū-rokku-nichi Chō Hidamatsuri" (Japanese: 8月26日 超ひだまつり)	Tatsuya Oishi	Tatsuya Oishi	Tatsuya Oishi	December 12, 2007
A short promotional video announcing the next anime season, Hidamari Sketch x 365.

== Hidamari Sketch × 365 ==
No.	Title	Directed by	Written by	Storyboarded by	Original release date
1 (13)	"Ume-sensei, Nice to Meet You!"; Transliteration: "Hajimemashite! Umetentē" (Japanese: はじめまして! うめてんてー)	Tatsuya Oishi	Nahoko Hasegawa	Tatsuya Oishi	July 4, 2008
Accompanied by her mother, Yuno comes to Yamabuki Art High School to take the entrance exam. After getting accepted into the school, she settles in the Hidamari apartment and makes friends with the new neighbors.
2 (14)	"February 6: Cherry Blossom, Cherry Blossom"; Transliteration: "Ni-gatsu Muika Sakurasakura" (Japanese: 2月6日 サクラサクラ)	Yoshihiro Mori	Natsue Yoguchi	Yoshihiro Mori	July 11, 2008
Sae's little sister, Chika, has just passed a high school entrance exam. Meanwhile, the Hidamari residents realizes that they also had a similar experience exactly one year ago.
3 (15)	"May 27: Koma Monster"; Transliteration: "Go-gatsu Ni-jū-shichi-nichi Koma Monsutā" (Japanese: 5月27日 狛モンスター)	Keiichi Honda (Note: Assisted by Yukihiro Miyamoto.)	Miku Ooshima	Keiichi Honda	July 18, 2008
Yuno and Miyako visit a Shinto shrine near Iwakaba, a place recommended by Yoshinoya, by a train. After that, they spend their time together, drawing pictures of the landscape around the shrine.
4 (16)	"March 16−23: Mild Tuna Flavor"; Transliteration: "San-gatsu Jū-roku kara Ni-jū-san-nichi Maroyaka Tsuna Fūmi" (Japanese: 3月16から23日 まろやかツナ風味)	Shin Oonuma	Natsue Yoguchi	Kiyoshi Egami	July 25, 2008
4 (16)	"October 31: Gagagaga"; Transliteration: "Jū-gatsu San-jū-ichi-nichi Gagagaga" (Japanese: 10月31日 ガガガガ)	Shin Oonuma	Natsue Yoguchi	Kiyoshi Egami	July 25, 2008
In the first part of the episode, a male stray cat starts to live in Miyako's room. After a few days, however, the cat disappears from Hidamari apartment, making Yuno cry. The second part shows how Yuno prepares for the cultural festival, in which the result is shown in the tenth episode of the previous season.
5 (17)	"March 25: Congratulations, Chika"; Transliteration: "San-gatsu Ni-jū-go-nichi Omechika" (Japanese: 3月25日 おめちか)	Tomoyuki Itamura	Nahoko Hasegawa	Michio Fukuda	August 1, 2008
After visiting the Hidamari apartments, Chika chats with her friends and enjoys dumplings, which is her favorite dish. After that, they go to a karaoke box, but are soon disappointed that the place is closed for business. They instead head to a communal bath house, where they meet Yoshinoya and spend their time singing various songs together.
6 (18)	"July 30: Saeta"; Transliteration: "Shichi-gatsu San-jū-nichi Saeta" (Japanese: 7月30日 さえ太)	Kenichi Ishikura	Miku Ooshima	Kenichi Ishikura	August 8, 2008
6 (18)	"November 11: Hiroemon"; Transliteration: "Jū-ichi-gatsu Jū-ichi-nichi Hiroemon" (Japanese: 11月11日 ヒロえもん)	Kenichi Ishikura	Miku Ooshima	Kenichi Ishikura	August 8, 2008
In the first part of the episode, Sae tries to finish her novel and goes to a café for an appointment with the monthly magazine editor. Before the talk with the editor, Sae confronts Natsume, in which Sae hopes Natsume doesn't find out about her profession. Afterward, Sae asks her friends whether any of them have experience of falling in love as she needed some inspiration for her romantic novel. In the night, Sae gives a phone call to Chika as she was apparently worried about her sister. In the second part of the episode, Sae and Hiro participate in a cooking class, where Hiro shows off her experienced skill in cooking. After the class, Hiro discovers Natsume in a flurry, buying a monthly magazine in which Sae's romantic novel, which was written during the first part of the episode, is published.
7 (19)	"April 7: The Entrance Ceremony and Welcome Party"; Transliteration: "Shi-gatsu Nanoka Nyūgakushiki to Kangeikai" (Japanese: 4月7日 入学式と歓迎会)	Yoshihiro Mori	Miku Ooshima	Yoshihiro Mori	August 15, 2008
Yuno and Miyako attend the school entrance ceremony, in which Miyako falls asleep due to principal's tedious speech. Meanwhile, Hiro and Sae stay at the Hidamari apartment and they happen to meet with Misato and the landlady in the morning. After the ceremony, Hiro and Sae makes a surprise welcome party for the new Hidamari neighbors.
8 (20)	"October 13: King of the Hill"; Transliteration: "Jū-gatsu Jū-san-nichi Oyama no Taishō" (Japanese: 10月13日 お山の大将)	Masayuki Iimura	Natsue Yoguchi	Keiichi Honda	August 22, 2008
Students of Yamabuki Art High School, including Yuno and her friends, participate in a sports day event. Yuno's class under Yoshinoya represents the red team, while Natsume's class represents the white team. Later, the red team manages to defeat its rival, the white team. After the competition, Yuno and her friends together go back to their apartment and look back what they have done during the day.
9 (21)	"August 5: No Rest for Summer Break"; Transliteration: "Hachi-gatsu Itsuka Natsuyasume Nāi" (Japanese: 8月5日 ナツヤスメナーイ)	Jirou Fujimoto	Natsue Yoguchi	Jirou Fujimoto	August 29, 2008
9 (21)	"December 3: The Wolf of Shinjuku Back Streets: Part II"; Transliteration: "Jūni-gatsu Mikka Ura-Shinjuku no Ōkami Pāto Tō" (Japanese: 12月3日 裏新宿の狼 Part 2)	Jirou Fujimoto	Natsue Yoguchi	Jirou Fujimoto	August 29, 2008
Yuno and Miyako's teacher, Yoshinoya, has to finish the remaining school works during the summer break under the Principal's watch. However, she keeps slacking off from her work as she takes photographs of herself, which will be used for the postcards that she will be sending out to the students. When Natsume discovers Yoshinoya in the school, Yoshinoya asks her to put some of the postcards in the mailbox of Hidamari apartment. In the second part of the episode, Yuno and her friends goes out to watch a movie, which is directed by a Kishi who is a graduate from Yamabuki high school. After that, Yuno and her friends discover that Sae has received a letter from a fan of her literary work.
10 (22)	"June 8: Round Carrot"; Transliteration: "Roku-gatsu Yōka Māru Ninjin" (Japanese: 6月8日 まーるニンジン)	Tomoyuki Itamura	Miku Ooshima	Yoshihiro Mori	September 5, 2008
In Yoshinoya's art class, Yuno and Miyako sculpt shoes out of clay. Later, Yuno's parents make a surprise visit to Hidamari apartment.
11 (23)	"September 28: The Mystery of Pants"; Transliteration: "Ku-gatsu Ni-jū-hachi-nichi Pantsu no Kai" (Japanese: 9月28日 パンツの怪)	Yoshihiro Mori	Natsue Yoguchi	Yoshihiro Mori	September 12, 2008
In the early morning, Yuno makes onigiri bentos for Miyako and herself. When it is a lunch time, Yuno goes up to the rooftop of Yamabuki high school, which is prohibited area for students. After a brief assault of hungry pigeons, Yuno falls asleep on the rooftop. After the PE class in the afternoon, Yuno and her friends finds out that Hiro has been missing. When Yuno goes back to the dressing room to pick up the jerseys that she left, she hears a strange noise behind a door, where an unconscious Hiro is found. Then Yuno and her friends come to the conclusion that Hiro had stopped eating to fit into a tight pair of pants, where in actuality, Hiro had bumped her head on the low ceiling while putting them on.
12 (24)	"July 7: Don't Look At It"; Transliteration: "Shichi-gatsu Nanoka Micha Dame" (Japanese: 7月7日 見ちゃダメ)	Kenichi Ishikura	Miku Ooshima	Akiyuki Shinbo	September 19, 2008
12 (24)	"July 8: The Four People"; Transliteration: "Shichi-gatsu Yōka Yonin" (Japanese: 7月8日 四人)	Kenichi Ishikura	Miku Ooshima	Akiyuki Shinbo	September 19, 2008
After a small quarrel between Sae and Hiro, they have suddenly become antagonistic to each other. After noticing the tension between the two in the school, Yuno and Miyako tries to restore their friendship by inducing Sae to apologize to Hiro. Fortunately, their plan works out as Hiro accepts Sae's apology. Meanwhile, the landlady receives a bamboo trees as a present from one of her part-time job customer and she then decides to plant it next to the Hidamari apartment. After noticing the trees, the Hidamari residents celebrates Tanabata by putting up decorations on the bamboo trees and hanging small colorful papers with their wishes written.
13 (25)	"January 10: Welcome back! Ume-sensei!"; Transliteration: "Ichi-gatsu Tōka Okaeri Ume Sensei" (Japanese: 1月10日 おかえり うめ先生)	Masayuki Iimura	Nahoko Hasegawa	Masayuki Iimura	September 26, 2008
Yuno returns to the apartments after going back to her hometown during winter break. The girls talk about what they did during the break and then decide to visit the temple afterwards. On the way there, they visit Yoshinoya's house and invite her to come with them to the temple. While at the temple, they make New Year wishes and then head home. They talk about all sorts of stuff at home, like what they did last year and what they want to do this year.
OVA	"February 24: Polaroidon"; Transliteration: "Ni-gatsu Ni-jū-yokka: Poraroidon" (Japanese: 2月24日 ポラロイドン)	Yoshihiro Mori	Natsue Yoguchi	Yoshihiro Mori	March 25, 2009
OVA	"February 25: Won't Forget"; Transliteration: "Ni-gatsu Ni-jū-go-nichi: Wasurete nai yo" (Japanese: 2月25日 忘れてないよ)	Yoshihiro Mori	Natsue Yoguchi	Yoshihiro Mori	March 25, 2009
Sae buys a second-hand Polaroid camera and the four girls take pictures of each other dressing up and posing in different ways. Later Yuno calls Chika and arranges for her to visit Hidamari Apartments on March 25, as seen in episode five of the second series. In the very brief second episode set the morning after, Yuno, Sae and Miyako wake up to discover a picture of their sleeping faces beside them on their pillows. This is Hiro's revenge for them laughing at the picture Sae took of her sleeping the day before.

=== Specials ===
No.	Title	Directed by	Written by	Storyboarded by	Original release date
1	"February 10: Going Anywhere Bicycle"; Transliteration: "Ni-gatsu Tōka Dokodemo Jitensha" (Japanese: 2月10日 どこでも自転車)	Yoshihiro Mori	Natsue Yoguchi	Yoshihiro Mori	October 18, 2009
1	"February 11: The Tortoise and the Hare"; Transliteration: "Ni-gatsu Jū-ichi-nichi Usagi to Kame" (Japanese: 2月11日 うさぎとかめ)	Yoshihiro Mori	Natsue Yoguchi	Yoshihiro Mori	October 18, 2009
Yuno is given a bicycle, but finds she cannot remember how to ride, so the girls take her to a riverside park to help her practice. Later that day, a third year student interviews the girls for the school's broadcasting club. When Sae goes out to buy groceries, she meets Natsume and uses the bicycle to help return a lost glove. In the evening, the girls help the landlady of Hidamari Apartments clear out the two unoccupied rooms ready for two new residents.
2	"June 6: Red Thread"; Transliteration: "Roku-gatsu Muika Akai Ito" (Japanese: 6月6日 赤い糸)	Kenichi Ishikura	Nahoko Hasegawa	Kenichi Ishikura	October 25, 2009
2	"June 7: Profound Meaning"; Transliteration: "Roku-gatsu Nanoka Imishin" (Japanese: 6月7日 イミシン)	Kenichi Ishikura	Nahoko Hasegawa	Kenichi Ishikura	October 25, 2009
When Yuno grabs Miyako to stop her slipping down the stairs, she accidentally rips Miyako's uniform. Yuno tries to repair it, but Yoshinoya invites them both to her office, which she has converted into a tailor's workshop, where she performs the repair. Later that day, Yuno discovers she has lost her new sketchbook, and everyone helps her to look for it.

== Hidamari Sketch × Hoshimittsu ==
No.	Title	Directed by	Written by	Storyboarded by	Original release date
1 (26)	"February 27 to March 4: Bright Red Mark"; Transliteration: "Ni-gatsu Ni-jū-shichi-nichi ～ San-gatsu Yokka Makka Ten" (Japanese: 2月27日～3月4日 真っ赤点)	Yukihiro Miyamoto	Natsue Yoguchi	Akiyuki Shinbo (Note: Credited as Satoko Shindou (進藤里子).)	January 8, 2010
1 (26)	"April 3: Welcome to Hidamari Apartments"; Transliteration: "Shi-gatsu Mikka Yōkoso Hidamari-sō e" (Japanese: 4月3日 ようこそ ひだまり荘へ)	Yukihiro Miyamoto	Natsue Yoguchi	Akiyuki Shinbo	January 8, 2010
After a bad start to the day breaking some plates, Yuno gets a low score on her grammar test and has to take a makeup exam. After studying for the retake, she gets a perfect score, but accidentally rips her sheet. On April 1, Yuno hears from the landlord that new freshmen will be coming to Hidamari Apartments, so the girls help clean the other rooms up. On April 3, one of the freshmen's parents arrive with her things and offer to take the girls out to lunch. While they do that, the new freshmen, Nazuna and Nori, arrive at the apartments and are surprised that they cannot find anyone else. When the girls get back from their lunch, they meet with the new residents and officially welcome them to the apartments.
2 (27)	"April 6–7: Yes/No"; Transliteration: "Shi-gatsu Muika ～ Nanoka Iesu Nō" (Japanese: 4月6日～7日 イエスノー)	Yukihiro Miyamoto; Yasuo Ejima	Nahoko Hasegawa	Shinichi Omata	January 15, 2010
2 (27)	"July 19: Olive"; Transliteration: "Shichi-gatsu Jū-ku-nichi Orību" (Japanese: 7月19日 オリーブ)	Yukihiro Miyamoto; Yasuo Ejima	Nahoko Hasegawa	Shinichi Omata	January 15, 2010
On April 6, the girls hold a welcome party for Nazuna and Nori. Miyako brings a 'question dice' in order to find out things about the freshmen. The next morning, the gang are surprised to hear Nazuna is in general education instead of the arts department like they had assumed. Miyako thinks back to July 19 of the previous year when she accidentally set a small part of her hair on fire, and she and Yuno went to a hair salon named Olive run by twin hairdressers.
3 (28)	"April 8–9: Decision"; Transliteration: "Shi-gatsu Yōka ～ Kokonoka Ketsudan" (Japanese: 4月8日～9日 決断)	Hisatoshi Shimizu	Miku Ooshima	Jirou Yamada (Note: Possibly a pseudonym of Jirou Fujimoto.)	January 22, 2010
3 (28)	"December 10: Because the Cup is Small"; Transliteration: "Jū-ni-gatsu Tōka Kappu Chiisai desu kara" (Japanese: 12月10日 カップ小さいですから)	Hisatoshi Shimizu	Miku Ooshima	Jirou Yamada	January 22, 2010
After the first day back at school on April 8, Yuno has trouble deciding what electives to take. After talking with Sae and Hiro, she decides on planes. Back on December 10, Yuno runs into Sae at the bookstore, where they learn her the magazine which published her novella has already sold out. They later go to a café where Sae talks about whether she should aim for further teaching in literature or art.
4 (29)	"April 15: Satisfying Sunlight"; Transliteration: "Shi-gatsu Jū-go-nichi Hiatari no Ryōkō" (Japanese: 4月15日 日当たりの良好)	Kazuhide Kondou	Natsue Yoguchi	Kazuhide Kondou	January 29, 2010
Natsume gets a brief chance to walk home with Sae. Yuno, Miyako, Nori and Nazuna go to a home store to buy some new curtains for Nori's apartment, since her current ones are too short. Much to Nazuna's surprise, Nori goes with her suggestion. After running into the landlady at the gardening section, they buy a bunch of tomato seedlings to plant in the garden. Afterward, everyone has dinner at Hiro's place, and Nazuna and Nori start to bond.
5 (30)	"April 20: A Girl's Feelings"; Transliteration: "Shi-gatsu Hatsuka Onna no Ko no Kimochi" (Japanese: 4月20日 オンナノコのきもち)	Yoshito Mikamo	Nahoko Hasegawa	Shinichi Omata	February 5, 2010
5 (30)	"January 31: Honest Words"; Transliteration: "Ichi-gatsu San-jū-ichi-nichi Massugu na Kotoba" (Japanese: 1月31日 まっすぐな言葉)	Yoshito Mikamo	Nahoko Hasegawa	Shinichi Omata	February 5, 2010
On April 20, the girls go in for their physical exams, and Yuno is not too pleased with her results, which say she has shrunk since last year. Yuno gets a wrong number call from Arisawa, a former senior, and thinks back to when she met her on January 31. Yuno had left her cell phone at school, which was found by Arisawa who was drawing in the classroom. She draws a picture of Yuno and gives her some advice about college and the two become friends.
6 (31)	"October 15: Height of the Sky, Shade of the Grove"; Transliteration: "Jū-gatsu Jū-go-nichi Sora no Takasa mo Kodachi no Kage mo" (Japanese: 10月15日 空の高さも木立の影も)	Yuusuke Kamata	Nahoko Hasegawa	Yuusuke Kamata	February 12, 2010
6 (31)	"April 26–27: Expert on Love"; Transliteration: "Shi-gatsu Ni-jū-roku-nichi ～ Ni-jū-shichi-nichi Ren'ai Jōkyūsha" (Japanese: 4月26日～27日 恋愛上級者)	Yuusuke Kamata	Nahoko Hasegawa	Yuusuke Kamata	February 12, 2010
On October 15 of the previous year, Yoshinoya appears to be down, and is constantly checking her cell phone, leading Yuno and the others to think she may be in love. It later turns out she has been reading a romance novel on her phone. On April 26, the girls spot Nazuna on numerous occasions being assisted by boys and wonder if she is popular among them. When asked about it, Nazuna says she is not too keen with it since it makes the other girls jealous.
7(32)	"May 3–4: A Day in Seven Parts"; Transliteration: "Go-gatsu Mikka ～ Yokka Nana-tōbun no Hi" (Japanese: 5月3日～4日 7等分の日)	Masayuki Iimura (Note: Assisted by Susumu Endou.)	Nahoko Hasegawa	Naoyuki Kuzuya	February 19, 2010
Sae's younger sister Chika visits the Hidamari Apartments once again, where she meets Nazuna and Nori for the first time. The girls plan a picnic at a nearby lakeside park and later recount what they did and talked about back at the apartment building. As Chika is the same age as Nazuna and Nori, the three of them are able to quickly become friends.
8 (33)	"May 13–14: Yuno Crab"; Transliteration: "Go-gatsu Jū-san-nichi ～ Jū-yokka Yuno Kurabu" (Japanese: 5月13日～14日 ゆのクラブ)	Masanori Takahashi	Miku Ooshima	Masanori Takahashi	February 26, 2010
8 (33)	"September 26–27: Eggplants Really Are Great"; Transliteration: "Ku-gatsu Ni-jū-roku-nichi ～ Ni-jū-shichi-nichi Yappari Nasu ga Suki" (Japanese: 9月26日～27日 やっぱりナスが好き)	Masanori Takahashi	Miku Ooshima	Masanori Takahashi	February 26, 2010
On May 13, Yuno and Miyako hear from Nori about a delicious crab fried rice dish that is on the school menu for a limited time and become determined to try it. Unfortunately, it is sold out by the time they get to the cafeteria the next day, so Hiro makes them the dish with imitation crab. On September 26 of the previous year, Yuno struggles with drawing a motif, and feels depressed about the result when her drawing is not scored very high.
9 (34)	"November 22: Seniors and Freshmen"; Transliteration: "Jū-ichi-gatsu Ni-jū-ni-nichi Sannensei to Ichinensei" (Japanese: 11月22日 三年生と一年生)	Kazuhide Kondou (Note: Assisted by Yoshihide Yuuzumi.)	Nahoko Hasegawa	Kazuhide Kondou	March 5, 2010
9 (34)	"May 21: Crying Woman"; Transliteration: "Go-gatsu Ni-jū-ichi-nichi Naku Onna" (Japanese: 5月21日 泣く女)	Kazuhide Kondou	Nahoko Hasegawa	Kazuhide Kondou	March 5, 2010
On November 22, a few months before Yuno and Miyako would come to the Hidamari Apartments, Sae and Hiro's were in their first year and shared the Hidamari Apartments with their seniors, Misato and Riri. Sae has had trouble sleeping due to her writing work, so Hiro decides she will move into the room next to hers to support her. On May 21 of the present, Yuno and Miyako do some sketching at the park, where they throw stones at a weird shaped rock in the river.
10 (35)	"May 28 – June 2: Sunshine Palette"; Transliteration: "Go-gatsu Ni-jū-hachi-nichi ～ Roku-gatsu Futsuka Hidamari Paretto" (Japanese: 5月28日～6月2日 ひだまりパレット)	Susumu Endou	Miku Ooshima	Shinichi Omata	March 12, 2010
After accidentally flushing her apartment key down the toilet, Yuno asks the landlady for another one. While the landlady tries to find the spare key among various other junk, Yuno spends each night sleeping over at each of the residents' apartments. After five nights, the landlady manages to find the spare key and Yuno finally returns to her apartment, only to be greeted by a foul smell from some leftover cooking.
11 (36)	"June 5: Matchstick Mystery"; Transliteration: "Roku-gatsu Itsuka Macchibō no Nazo" (Japanese: 6月5日 マッチ棒の謎)	Hisatoshi Shimizu	Natsue Yoguchi	Hisatoshi Shimizu	March 19, 2010
11 (36)	"February 16: 48.5cm" Transliteration: "Ni-gatsu Jū-roku-nichi Yon-jū-hatten-go Senchi" (Japanese: 2月16日 48.5cm)	Hisatoshi Shimizu	Natsue Yoguchi	Hisatoshi Shimizu	March 19, 2010
On June 5, it begins raining and will continue for the rest of the day. Yuno and Miyako see a puzzle involving matchsticks on TV where the answer is revealed to be online, so they head over to Nori's room to check it on her computer; Nazuna had already come over. After playing for a bit on the computer, they order a pizza around noon and later Hiro and Sae also come over for the same reason Yuno and Miyako had. Back on February 16, the seniors are participating in a tradition where they display voluntary final projects around the school. Yuno laments that Hiro and Sae will be graduating the following year, but cheers up after meeting Arisawa again. On March 7, Yuno and Miyako enjoy the cherry blossoms during the graduation ceremony, getting ready to become juniors.
12 (37)	"July 12: Three Stars × Lycopene"; Transliteration: "Shichi-gatsu Jū-ni-nichi Mitsuboshi × Rikopin" (Japanese: 7月12日 みつぼし×リコピン)	Susumu Endou; Kenichi Ishikura	Nahoko Hasegawa	Kazuhide Kondou	March 25, 2010
The girls pick the tomatoes they planted in the garden of Hidamari Apartments earlier in the year. After they spend the day preparing tomato-based dishes, the landlady joins them for dinner, and they later give Yoshinoya a jar of the leftover pasta sauce.

=== Specials ===
No.	Title	Directed by	Written by	Storyboarded by	Original release date
1	"June 11: Yay, Family Restaurant!"; Transliteration: "Roku-gatsu Jū-ichi-nichi: Famiresu Wasshoi!" (Japanese: 6月11日 ファミレスわっしょい!)	Susumu Endou; Kenichi Ishikura	Miku Ooshima	Kazuhide Kondou	October 24, 2010
1	"April 7–17: Natsume..."; Transliteration: "Shi-gatsu Nanoka ～ Jū-shichi-nichi: Natsume..." (Japanese: 4月7日～17日 なつめ...)	Susumu Endou; Kenichi Ishikura	Miku Ooshima	Kazuhide Kondou	October 24, 2010
After receiving some coupons in their mailboxes, the girls decide to check out the opening of a family restaurant. To their surprise, they find the landlady is working there. On her first day of school, Natsume has a tough time, as her train gets delayed and she has trouble finding her shoe locker. This is where she first meets Sae and becomes instantly smitten with her. However, she has trouble trying to run into Sae throughout the week. She eventually spots her, but is shocked to see she is already close friends with Hiro, which explains her antagonistic attitude towards Sae.
2	"June 23–25: Back Home"; Transliteration: "Roku-gatsu Ni-jū-san-nichi ～ Ni-jū-go-nichi: Kaecchatta" (Japanese: 6月23日～25日 帰っちゃった)	Kenichi Ishikura	Miku Ooshima	Kenichi Ishikura	October 31, 2010
2	"July 30: Barbecue"; Transliteration: "Shichi-gatsu San-jū-nichi: Babekyu" (Japanese: 7月30日 バベキュ)	Kenichi Ishikura	Miku Ooshima	Kenichi Ishikura	October 31, 2010
A bout of homesickness drives Yuno to pay a short visit to her parents' home, where she catches up on the lives of the friends she left behind. Later, Miyako finds an old barbecue and plans a cook-out in the back garden of Hidamari Apartments. While out buying charcoal for the barbecue, Sae and Hiro bump into Natsume and invite her along. That afternoon, she and Miss Yoshinoya join the residents of Hidamari Apartments at their barbecue. Having finally got the opportunity to spend some time together, Natsume overcomes her hostility towards Sae.

== Hidamari Sketch x SP ==
No.	Title	Directed by	Written by	Storyboarded by	Original release date
1 (38)	"July 15: Feeling It"; Transliteration: "Shichi-gatsu Jū-go-nichi: Kanjiru Mama ni" (Japanese: = 7月15日 感じるままに)	Tomoyuki Itamura	Nahoko Hasegawa	Yoshiaki Itou	October 30, 2011
1 (38)	"August 28: Floaty"; Transliteration: "Hachi-gatsu Ni-jū-hachi-nichi: Pukari" (Japanese: 8月28日 プカリ)	Tomoyuki Itamura	Nahoko Hasegawa	Yoshiaki Itou	October 30, 2011
On July 15, the girls go to an open-air museum, where they see lots of interesting statues. On August 28, Yuno, Miyako, Nori and Nazuna go to an indoor swimming pool, before returning to the Hidamari Apartments to have a pajama party with Sae and Hiro.
2 (39)	"May 9: Zabuzabuzazaa!!"; Transliteration: "Go-gatsu Kokonoka: Zabuzabuzazā!!" (Japanese: 5月 9日 ザブザブザザー!!)	Yukihiro Miyamoto	Miku Ooshima	Akiyuki Shinbo	November 6, 2011
2 (39)	"May 25: Welcome to the Village of Meat!"; Transliteration: "Go-gatsu Ni-jū-go-nichi: Rasshai! Niku no Sato" (Japanese: 5月 25日 らっしゃい! 肉の里)	Yukihiro Miyamoto	Miku Ooshima	Akiyuki Shinbo	November 6, 2011
On May 9, the girls get together to wash their curtains in an inflatable swimming pool. On May 25, the landlady treats everyone to dinner at an all-you-can-eat yakiniku restaurant.

== Hidamari Sketch x Honeycomb ==
No.	Title	Directed by	Written by	Storyboarded by	Original release date
1 (40)	"May 6–15: Narrow Japan, Where Are You Hurrying Off To?"; Transliteration: "Go-gatsu Rokku-nichi ~ Go-gatsu Jū-go-nichi Semai Nippon Sonnani Isoide Doko e Iku" (Japanese: 5月6日～15日 狭い日本 そんなに急いでどこへ行く)	Yuki Yase	Miku Ooshima	Naoyuki Tatsuwa	October 5, 2012
1 (40)	"May 16–18: Everything's Bigger in Hokkaido!"; Transliteration: "Go-gatsu Jū-roku-nichi ~ Go-gatsu Ju-hachi-nichi Doko demo Dekkaidō" (Japanese: 5月16日～18日 どこでもでっかいどー)	Yuki Yase	Miku Ooshima	Naoyuki Tatsuwa	October 5, 2012
Yuno and Miyako become curious about the noises going on in Sae's apartment, which turns out to be a discussion about a school trip to Hokkaido the third years are going on. As Hiro and Sae go on their trip, Yuno tries to think of how she can be more of an upperclassman to Nori and Nazuna.
2 (41)	"May 18–19: Yuno-sama from Above"; Transliteration: "Go-gatsu Jū-hachi-nichi ~ Jū-ku-nichi Ue kara Yuno-sama" (Japanese: 5月18日～19日 上からゆのさま)	Yoshito Mikamo	Miku Ooshima	Naoyuki Tatsuwa	October 12, 2012
As Hiro and Sae continue on their Hokkaido school trip with a visit to a glassmaking factory, Yuno continues to struggle with how to become a good upperclassman. Yuno and Miyako decide to take Nori and Nazuna on their first trip to the public baths, where they tell them a bit more about Hiro and Sae. After Hiro and Sae return from their trip, they bring back some souvenirs for the others.
3 (42)	"August 31: The Final Visitor of Summer Vacation"; Transliteration: "Hachi-gatsu San-jū-ichi-nichi Natsuyasumi Saigo no Raihōsha" (Japanese: 8月31日 夏休み最後の来訪者)	Shunsuke Ishikawa	Nahoko Hasegawa	Mitsuru Sasaki	October 19, 2012
3 (42)	"September 1: Mochi Sweets"; Transliteration: "Ku-gatsu Tsuitachi Okashi Mochi" (Japanese: 9月1日 おかしもち)	Shunsuke Ishikawa	Nahoko Hasegawa	Mitsuru Sasaki	October 19, 2012
Yuno and Miyako's plans to spend the last day of Summer having fun is thwarted when a typhoon settles in, so everyone retreats to Hiro's apartment for some food. Afterwards, Yuno looks over her summer homework. As school resumes the next day, a fire drill is held, during which Nazuna feels the need to go to the bathroom.
4 (43)	"September 15: The Shutter Chance of Victory!! The Winner is Miyako!!"; Transliteration: "Ku-gatsu Jū-go-nichi Shōri no Shattā Chansu!! Katsu no wa Miyako da!!" (Japanese: 9月15日 勝利のシャッターチャンス!!勝つのは宮子だ!!)	Naoki Murata (Note: Assisted by Yutaka Murata.)	Nahoko Hasegawa	Mitsuru Sasaki	October 26, 2012
The school holds a swim meet, with Miyako, Nori and Sae competing whilst Yuno is part of the camera crew. Nori, Sae and Miyako all manage to win their events, bringing their overall team to victory. Afterwards, everyone checks the school's homepage to see the photos Yuno had taken.
5 (44)	"September 17–19: Nazuna Rice"; Transliteration: "Ku-gatsu Jū-shichi-nichi ~ Jū-ku-nichi Nazuna Gohan" (Japanese: 9月17日～19日 ナズナゴハン)	Hitomi Ezoe	Miku Ooshima	Kazuya Shiotsuki	November 2, 2012
5 (44)	"September 28: Midnight Norisuke"; Transliteration: "Ku-gatsu Ni-jū-hachi-nichi Mayonaka Norisuke" (Japanese: 9月28日 マヨナカノリスケ)	Hitomi Ezoe	Miku Ooshima	Kazuya Shiotsuki	November 2, 2012
Having inadvertently told her parents that she knew how to cook, Nazuna asks Hiro and Yuno to teach her how to make chicken karaage and miso soup for when they come over. When something goes wrong with Nazuna's rice, the others help her make the most of it. Later, after Nori wakes up in the middle of the night following a bad dream, she goes over to Sae's apartment, where the two spend the whole night talking.
6 (45)	"September 25: Chatting Sketch"; Transliteration: "Ku-gatsu Ni-jū-go-nichi Oshaberi Sukecchi" (Japanese: 9月25日 おしゃべりスケッチ)	Yutaka Hirata	Miku Ooshima	Yuki Yase	November 9, 2012
6 (45)	"September 29–30: Hiro-san"; Transliteration: "Ku-gatsu Ni-jū-ku-nichi ~ San-jū-nichi Hiro-san" (Japanese: 9月29日～30日 ヒロさん)	Yutaka Hirata	Miku Ooshima	Yuki Yase	November 9, 2012
Yuno and Miyako spend a lot of time chatting whilst drawing self-portraits in class. After class, they proceed to try and spend the entire night chatting with each other. Meanwhile, Hiro is troubled over what she should do after she graduates. As she talks with Yoshinoya about possibly wanting to become a teacher, she comes to realise that she is just trying to escape the reality that she will soon have to leave everyone at the Hidamari Apartments. After the others become worried about her, Sae pops over to her apartment later that night to comfort her. The next morning, Hiro returns to her more cheerful self and makes her decision to become a teacher.
7 (46)	"October 5–6: Pamphlet Competition"; Transliteration: "Jū-gatsu Itsuka ~ Muika Panfu Konpeppe" (Japanese: 10月5日～6日 パンフコンペッペ)	Kouta Okuno (Note: Assisted by Taichi Atarashi.)	Nahoko Hasegawa	Mitsuru Sasaki	November 16, 2012
7 (46)	"October 6–8: A Secret Date"; Transliteration: "Jū-gatsu Muika ~ Yōka Himitsu no Dēto" (Japanese: 10月6日～8日 ひみつのデート)	Kouta Okuno	Nahoko Hasegawa	Mitsuru Sasaki	November 16, 2012
Yuno's class is tasked with designing a pamphlet for an upcoming school festival. Yuno works hard on her design and it ends up being chosen. Later, Yuno is invited on a date by Arisawa, where they catch up with each other.
8 (47)	"October 11,30: Terror! Preparing Yamabuki Festival"; Transliteration: "Jū-gatsu Jū-ichi-nichi, San-jū-nichi Kyōfu! Yamabukisai Junbi-hen" (Japanese: 10月11日,30日 恐怖! やまぶき祭 準備編)	Shunsuke Ishikawa	Nahoko Hasegawa	Mitsuru Sasaki	November 23, 2012
8 (47)	"November 3: Strange! The Day of Yamabuki Festival"; Transliteration: "Jū-ichi-gatsu Mikka Kaiki! Yamabukisai Tōjitsu-hen" (Japanese: 11月3日 怪奇! やまぶき祭 当日編)	Shunsuke Ishikawa	Nahoko Hasegawa	Mitsuru Sasaki	November 23, 2012
As preparations for the Yamabuki Festival get underway, Yuno's class decides to do a haunted house. Whilst working on some props, Miyako ends up injuring her hand. On the day of the festival, Yuno and Miyako check out the other class's booths, as well as run into Arisawa and her friend. Later, Hiro and the others visit Yuno's haunted house, which proves to be a successful scare. Afterwards, Yuno escorts her parents around the festival before rejoining Miyako for the post-festival dance.
9 (48)	"November 10: Returning a Smile"; Transliteration: "Jū-ichi-gatsu Tōka Hohoemi Gaeshi" (Japanese: 11月10日 ほほえみがえし)	Yukihiro Miyamoto (Note: Assisted by Shunsuke Ishikawa.)	Miku Ooshima	Mitsuru Sasaki	November 30, 2012
The Landlady wins a Game of Life board game in a lottery and gives it to the girls, who personalise the game into a 'Hidamari Apartments edition'. Whilst playing through the game, the gang receives a call from Chika, which proves embarrassing for Sae since the game forces her to act like a cat. As the game goes on, Nazuna and Nori learn more about the apartment whilst everyone wonders about the Landlady's actual job. Nori ends up winning the game whilst everyone thinks about their futures.
10 (49)	"December 2: An Educational Snowball Fight"; Transliteration: "Jū-ni-gatsu Futsuka Manaberu Yukigassen" (Japanese: 12月2日 学べる雪合戦)	Kouta Okuno	Miku Ooshima	Shinichi Omata	December 7, 2012
10 (49)	"December 15: Hidamari Cheer Squad"; Transliteration: "Jū-ni-gatsu Jū-go-nichi Hidamari Ōendan" (Japanese: 12月15日 ひだまり応援団)	Kouta Okuno	Miku Ooshima	Shinichi Omata	December 7, 2012
After snow falls on the Hidamari Apartments, the residents attempt to resist the urge to play in the snow instead of concentrating on their studies. Later, Chika visits the Hidamari Apartments to discuss Sae's mock exam results with her before joining the others for a gyouza party. Things get a little awkward when the discussion moves to Hiro and Sae's impending graduation, but they instead choose to cheer them on for their exams.
11 (50)	"December 22: It's Cause I'm Your Big Sister"; Transliteration: "Jū-ni-gatsu Ni-jū-ni-nichi Onee-chan Datta no desu ne" (Japanese: 12月22日 お姉ちゃんだったのですね)	Hitomi Ezoe	Nahoko Hasegawa	Mitsuru Sasaki	December 14, 2012
11 (50)	"December 21–24: Faint Memory of a Song"; Transliteration: "Jū-ni-gatsu Ni-jū-ichi-nichi Ni-jū-yokka Urooboe Uta" (Japanese: 12月21日～12月24日、うろおぼえうた)	Hitomi Ezoe	Nahoko Hasegawa	Mitsuru Sasaki	December 14, 2012
Yuno, Miyako and their classmates come over to Yoshinoya's house to help clear out some books from her room, where they meet Yoshinoya's brother and his child. Later, Sae invites Natsume to join the others for a christmas party at the Hidamari Apartments, where they eat food and have a present exchange. Despite her initial reservations, Natsume ends up having fun with everyone. As Sae walks Natsume back to the station, she learns Natsume is a fan of her books.
12 (51)	"December 31 - January 1: Years Together, Years to Come"; Transliteration: "Jū-ni-gatsu San-jū-ichi-nichi Ichi-gatsu Tsuitachi Yuku Toshi Kuru Toshi" (Japanese: 12月31日～1月1日、ゆく年くる年)	Yuki Yase	Miku Ooshima	Yuki Yase	December 21, 2012
As Hiro and Sae study for their exams, the others help Nazuna write some New Year's Greeting Cards before visiting the baths. After seeing in the new year, Hiro and Sae get some rest before joining the others for a shrine visit. They are soon joined by Yoshinoya, Natsume, the landlady and the principal to watch the first sunrise.

== Hidamari Sketch: Sae & Hiro's Graduation Arc ==
No.	Title	Directed by	Written by	Storyboarded by	Original release date
1	"February 1–20 - Examination Sketch"; Transliteration: "Ni-gatsu Tsuitachi Ni-jū-nichi Juken Suketchi" (Japanese: 2月1日~20日 受験スケッチ)	Yuki Yase	Miku Ooshima	Kazuya Shiotsuki	November 27, 2013
The Hidamari residents give Sae and Hiro their support as they take their college exams. Sae manages to pass her exams whilst Hiro awaits the results from her choices. After an agonising wait, Hiro manages to pass her first choice's exams. The others soon hold a congratulatory party, with Chika also ringing to congratulate them. After the party, however, Yuno starts to worry about their upcoming graduation and their inevitable departure from Hidamari Apartments.
2	"February 28 - March 1 - Graduation Sketch"; Transliteration: "Ni-gatsu Ni-jū-hachi-nichi San-gatsu Tsuitachi Sotsugyō Suketchi" (Japanese: 2月28日~3月1日 卒業スケッチ)	Unknown (non-credit)	Miku Ooshima	Yuki Yase	November 27, 2013
In the run up to graduation, Sae and Hiro tell the others about how they first met upon first moving into the Hidamari Apartments. Graduation day soon arrives, with many tears shed, particularly from Natsume as she gives her wishes to Sae. Afterwards, the other residents give themselves three minutes of selfishness before giving Sae and Hiro their encouragement. Later that night, Yuno comes to realized that, even though Sae and Hiro are leaving, she has made so many friends since moving into Hidamari Apartments.
