= Ikki Shimamura =

Japanese baseball player

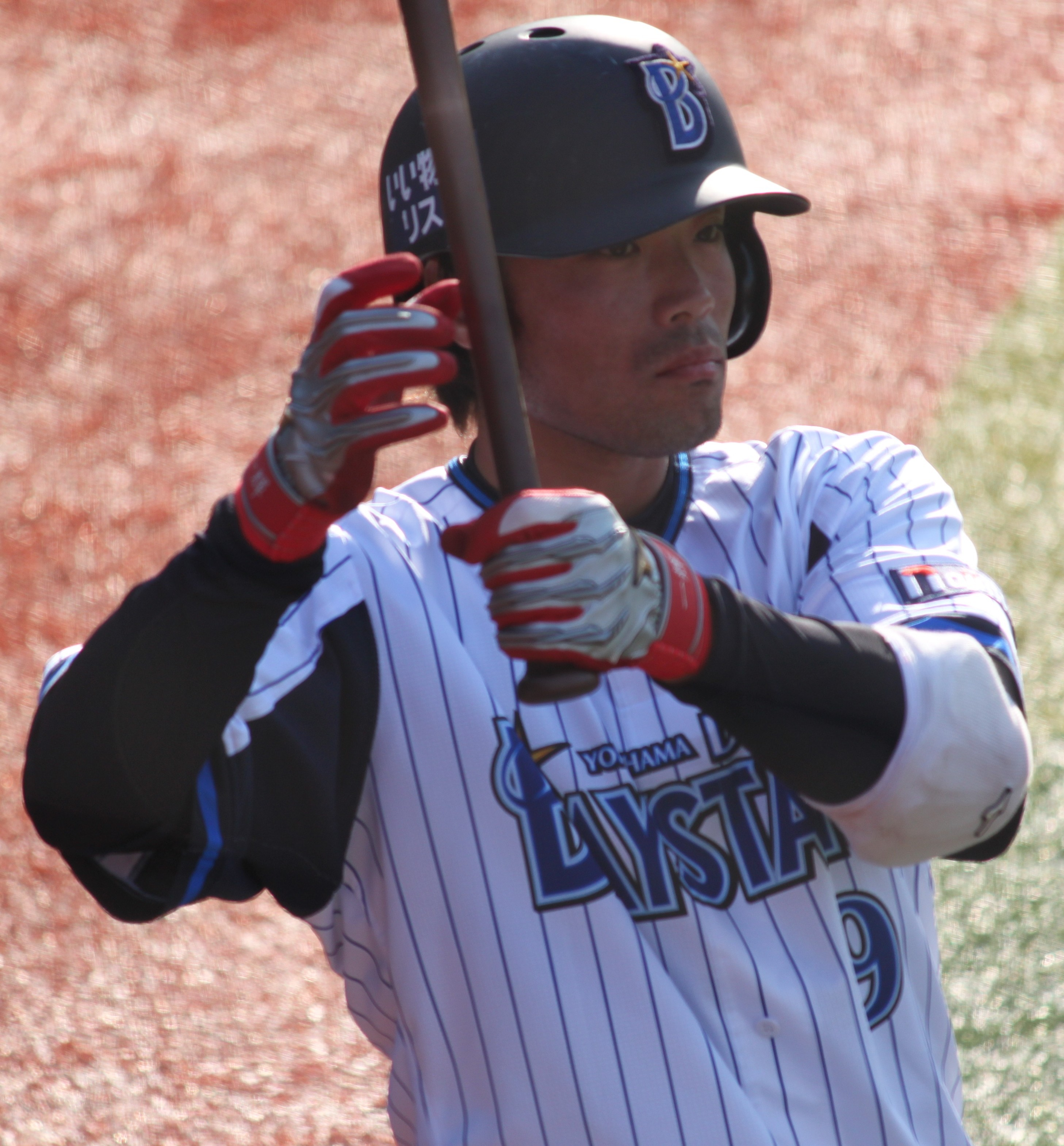

Orix Buffaloes – No. 78
- Coach
- Born: October 13, 1981 (age 44); Shimonoseki, Yamaguchi, Japan
- Batted: Right Threw: Right

NPB debut
- August 4, 2004, for the Orix BlueWave

Last NPB appearance
- October 7, 2012, for the Yokohama DeNA BayStars

NPB statistics (through 2013)
- Batting average: .233
- Hits: 112
- Home runs: 8
- RBI: 57
- Stolen bases: 3

Teams
- As player: Orix BlueWave/Orix Buffaloes (2004–2010); Yokohama BayStars/Yokohama DeNA BayStars (2011–2013); As coach: Yokohama DeNA BayStars (2014–2015, 2018–2024); Chunichi Dragons (2016–2017); Orix Buffaloes (2025-present)

Ikki Shimamura (嶋村 一輝, Shimamura Ikki; born October 13, 1981) also known as Ikki (一輝) is a Japanese former professional baseball player.
