= Rental Magica =

Japanese light novel series

- Cover of the first light novel

レンタルマギカ (Rentaru Magika)
- Genre: Magic, Supernatural
- Light novel
- Written by: Makoto Sanda
- Illustrated by: pako
- Published by: Kadokawa Shoten
- Imprint: Kadokawa Sneaker Bunko
- Magazine: The Sneaker
- Original run: August 31, 2004 – March 30, 2013
- Volumes: 24
- Manga
- Written by: Makoto Sanda
- Illustrated by: Akiho Narimiya
- Published by: Kadokawa Shoten
- Magazine: Asuka
- Original run: June 24, 2006 – July 24, 2009
- Volumes: 5
- Manga

Rental Magica from SOLOMON
- Written by: Makoto Sanda
- Illustrated by: MAKOTO2
- Published by: Kadokawa Shoten
- Magazine: Comp Ace
- Original run: May 26, 2007 – March 26, 2008
- Volumes: 2
- Anime television series
- Directed by: Itsuro Kawasaki
- Produced by: Tomoko Kawasaki; Takashi Tachizaki; Tsuneo Takechi; Tomoko Suzuki; Kuniteru Yamaguchi; Tetsu Haruki
- Written by: Makoto Sanda; Mamiko Ikeda
- Music by: Jun Ichikawa; Takahito Eguchi
- Studio: Zexcs
- Licensed by: NA: Nozomi Entertainment; UK: Anime Limited
- Original network: Chiba TV, KBS Kyoto, Sun TV, Tokyo MX TV, TV Aichi, TV Hokkaido, TV Kanagawa, TV Saitama, TVQ Kyushu Broadcasting
- English network: PH: Yey!; SEA: Animax Asia
- Original run: October 7, 2007 – March 23, 2008
- Episodes: 24

Rental Magica (Japanese: レンタルマギカ, Hepburn: Rentaru Magika) is a Japanese light novel series by Makoto Sanda, with illustrations by Pako. It was serialized in The Sneaker magazine published by Kadokawa Shoten from August 2004 to March 2013. An anime television series adaptation produced by Zexcs aired in Japan from October 7, 2007, to March 23, 2008.

== Plot ==
The plot centers on the magician-dispatch service and Mage's Society: Astral. The main protagonist of the story is Astral's second president: Itsuki Iba, who, although he is young and inexperienced, ironically is not even a mage. Central to the story are Astral's many adventures with magical spirits and creatures, competing with rival company Goetia, rogue members, taboos and the Dark Magician's Society: Ophion, all while trying to complete enough jobs to pay the bills and fill The Association's quota and evade abolition. Each story arc is written as an incident in which the Astral members and their associates are involved.

== Characters ==
=== Astral ===
Itsuki Iba (伊庭 いつき, Iba Itsuki)
Voiced by: Jun Fukuyama, Fuyuka Oura (young Itsuki)
The founder of the kind and well-meaning second president, who inherited the title after his father, first president Tsukasa Iba mysteriously disappeared. Itsuki possesses Glam Sight (妖精眼, fairy eye) in his right eye which, when used, allows him to see magic and its weaknesses, control the flow of spell-waves and even peer into the memories of magic users who do battle against it. Itsuki's Glam Sight is extremely painful for him to use. Given his lack of formal training in its use, it is extremely dangerous to his well-being. Frequently, Itsuki's use of Glam Sight results in him receiving spell-wave contamination, the magical equivalence of radiation poisoning. When Itsuki uses his Glam Sight, then his personality becomes more dominant, and his confidence is boosted. However, when the Glam Sight is sealed by the eye-patch, then he reverts to his original tender personality.
Itsuki's Glam Sight differs from normal Glam Sight, as its power is substantially amplified, and a mysterious voice can be heard during magical incidents warning Itsuki of danger and providing analysis that Itsuki himself is unable of providing. Itsuki's Glam Sight was changed when, as children, he and Honami ventured into a Haunted house, whereupon they encountered an infant Dragon and Itsuki's exposure to the Dragon's true form resulted in the tainting of his Glam Sight. His memories of the event were subsequently sealed away as a result of the pass, or magical connection, between himself and the infant Dragon. There is a barrier that first-generation Astral members Judaix, Hazel, Sekiren, Kashiwara and Nekoyashiki erected to seal the Dragon away. Since The Dragon Incident arc, his memories of the event have returned a little. Itsuki is also learning Gogyouken from Sekiren, but otherwise has no talent for magic.
Honami Takase Ambler (穂波・高瀬・アンブラー, Honami Takase Anburā)
Voiced by: Kana Ueda
An Astral employee and Celtic magic and Witchcraft expert; unofficially, Itsuki's secretary and tutor in all things magic-related. Honami is the granddaughter of one of Astral's founders, Hazel Ambler, and is a childhood friend of Itsuki. She was present when Itsuki's Glam Sight was tainted and feels a deep sense of guilt over the incident. With her prodigious talent, the assistance of Fin Cruder, and a strong desire to master her art, she managed to revive the lost art of the Druids in two years. She competed for top seat of the "School" in England, with another child prodigy, Goetia's current Master, Adilisia Lenn Mathers. Honami speaks in Kansai dialect.
Honami has a crush on Itsuki and is the first one to hit him when any other girl pays even the slightest romantic attention to him. Honami is somewhat technophobic and is known to leave her room in quite a messy state. She does fortune-telling and writes a magazine column as side jobs.
Details are unknown but she calls the sentient wand (Living Wand) that she put in a suitcase "ojichan".
As noted in episode 11, the strength of Honami's powers depends on the moon. A full moon gives her great strength, while a crescent moon gives her little strength.
Mikan Katsuragi (葛城 みかん, Katsuragi Mikan)
Voiced by: Rie Kugimiya
A contract employee for Astral and Shinto specialist. She was part of the Katsuragi, an old and world-renowned family of Shinto practitioners, but came to Astral after she ran away from home. She is the youngest of Astral's members and refers to the others as family, despite their lack of blood relation. Mikan's side jobs include writing charms and conducting ceremonies.
Mikan left the Katsuragi household in order to prove that she was not merely her older sister, Kaori Katsuragi's, substitute; this feeling and her relationship with the Katsuragi family was resolved in the Oni Incident. Mikan is in her third year of Primary School.
Ren Nekoyashiki (猫屋敷 蓮, Nekoyashiki Ren)
Voiced by: Junichi Suwabe
Executive director and Onmyoudou expert of Astral. As his name suggests, Nekoyashiki is an Onmyouji that like cats and he is the only member of Astral referred to in a formal tone. He uses four cat Shikigami, or Shikineko, Seiryu (Azure Dragon of the East, 青龍), Byakko (White Tiger of the West, 白虎), Suzaku (Vermillion Bird of the South, 朱雀) and Genbu (Black Tortoise of the North, 玄武) (named after the Four Symbols) to perform his magic, but they are not required for him to do battle. Nekoyashiki, the youngest member of the first generation of Astral is the only member to remain full-time. Nekoyashiki writes for a magazine as his side job. When he was young he was a part of a number of organizations, including a large family of Onmyoudou practitioners that he was to inherit. He at one stage founded his own organization, naming it after himself, (Nekoyashiki meaning "cat mansion"). Nekoyashiki was in the business of laying curses before he was scouted by Sekiren. Nekoyashiki is approximately thirty years old.
Manami Kuroha (黒羽 まなみ, Kuroha Manami)
Voiced by: Shizuka Itō
Astral's latest apprentice and its only ghost member. Kuroha remembers nothing of her existence before her death except her name. Kuroha is able to change her outward appearance at will but comically, starting from episode 16, spends most of her time in a maid outfit. Kuroha's abilities include poltergeist and apport (顕現現象, kengen genshō), turning a part of her own aetherial body into other physical matter, abilities, she cleans the office and serves tea but she also studies hard, yearning to be a part of the team. Itsuki met and recruited Kuroha while Astral was dispelling a spell-wave contamination arising from a taboo, saving her from being consumed by a Soul-Eater. Later on in the novel, she falls in love with Itsuki.
Ortwin Grautz (オルトヴィーン・グラウツ, Orutovīn Gurautsu)
New member and rune magic expert. Approximately 14–15 years old. Formally a member of the Northern Europe company Mimir but joined Astral by force when his older brother contracted his services to Astral. Ortwin resents Astral and voices specific discontent towards Astral's second president, often doing so by using detestable words scolding in German. A junior from the "School" Honami and Adilisia attended. After joining Astral Ortwin set to improving management of the company. After the Vampire Incident he accepted Itsuki and in doing so, his position with Astral.
Sekiren (隻蓮, Sekiren)
Voiced by: Katsuyuki Konishi
Contract employee for Astral and expert in Buddhism. Usually seen in komuso attire, has been practising Vajrayana since he was quite young. Additionally he is a genius martial artist and a master of hidden weapons. Skillfully uses Mudra and Shingon(Mantra), his abilities exceed that of Honami or Nekoyashiki and since the Larva incident has been training Itsuki in Martial Arts. Has an old-fashioned way of thinking even trying to perform seppuku as a form of apology. Contrasting his abilities in battle magic, Sekiren possesses a peace-loving personality and is romantically interested in Goetia's Daphne. Sekiren is The chief priest of Ryuuren Temple but is known to be something of a wanderer. Sekiren is the member of Astral most familiar with the Dark Magician's Society: Ophion, Sekiren finds those who would choose taboos to be repulsive, a belief he shares with Nekoyashiki.
One of the three people responsible for making Itsuki's eye patch. On the request of The Association he is on investigation in Italy.
Hazel Ambler (ヘイゼル・アンブラー, Heizeru Anburā)
One of the founding members of Astral. An expert in magical objects and Astral board member, currently touring Europe. Highly skilled in rune magic and witchcraft, a dubbed the "Witch of witches". Hazel is Honami's grandmother and the one who explained Itsuki's Glam Sight to Honami. One of the three people responsible for making Itsuki's eye patch.

=== Ex Astral employees ===
Tsukasa Iba (伊庭 司, Iba Tsukasa)
Astral's legendary founder and its First President. The last of the Fairy Doctors, he is referred to as "the magician that does not use magic". Itsuki's father who went missing seven years ago before Itsuki became a president. Tsukasa likes to make fun of others. Astral's first president also fought with the Dark Magician's Society; Ophion, over the dragon that resides in Furube City. Tsukasa does not have any magical talent but has Gogyouken skill as a normal martial arts.
Judaix Tholoide (ユーダイクス・トロイデ, Yūdaikusu Toroide)
Voiced by: Hiroki Yasumoto
Another of Astral's founders and former board member: Judaix, an alchemist of prodigious talent. One of the three people responsible for making Itsuki's eye patch and the first of Astral's original members to respond to the initial Dragon incident that left Itsuki's Glam Sight changed.
Judaix is a mechanical doll (Automaton) that was repaired by Tsukasa Iba. After Tsukasa disappeared, he left Astral in order to pursue his investigation of Tsukasa's disappearance and also to advance his research. During the Alchemist Incident Tholoide engages in a Fehde, a magical duel, with Itsuki and the current Astral in order to obtain Tsukasa Iba's grimoire. After that, he left for Egypt with his familiar, Lapis. His leaving Astral is under examination by The Association. He later reappears again in London during the Ophion incident.

=== Magic Society Goetia ===
Adelicia Lenn Mathers (アディリシア・レン・メイザース, Adirishia Ren Meizāsu)
Voiced by: Mikako Takahashi
Hereditary leader of the prestigious Magician's Society Goetia and descendant of King Solomon. Adelicia practices the Magic of Solomon and is able to summon and command demons of the Ars Goetia. Adelicia's personality is reflected in the demons that she summons, most of them being strong attack types. Adelicia is a contemporary and arch-rival of Honami, the two competed for the top seat at the "Academy" in England, but she left to accede Goetia's leadership on the demise of her father, Oswald lenn Mathers. Adelicia is the youngest leader in the history of Goetia, as such this has caused friction with The Association.
Adelicia is also in love with Astral's Second President, and like Honami is the first one to criticise Itsuki for his inability. Notably, Adelicia has no culinary skill.
With the help of Astral, Adelicia was able to suppress evidence of the Taboo committed by Goetia's previous leadership. During the Alchemist incident, she became a major shareholder, acquiring Judaix's 20% of the Astral's operations. After the Alchemist incident, she frequently fights alongside the employees of Astral.

- The Mathers family most likely takes its name from Samuel Liddell MacGregor Mathers who translated several 'magical' texts (including The Key of Solomon) into English.

Daphne (ダフネ, Dafune)
Voiced by: Yūko Kaida
A loyal apprentice of Goetia, responsible for the maintenance of Goetia's residence in Furube City. Adelicia refers to her as the chief maid but Daphne prefers the title of steward. Later becomes Goetia's second in command. Daphne is proficient in both the Magic of Solomon and Rune Magic.
Daphne is actually Adelicia's older sister (from a different mother). Daphne had been in the Mathers residence since she was young. Daphne had the same blonde hair and green eyes as Adelicia, but finding it too similar, she used the colouring as a sacrifice to the Demons of Solomon. Daphne chose ivory hair and slate-coloured eyes so that she could continue to serve Goetia as Adelicia's protector while maintaining her identity as Adelicia's sister a secret. Daphne became romantically involved with Sekiren, while the two were investigating a magician that committed a taboo.
Oswald Lenn Mathers (オズワルド・レン・メイザース, Ozuwarudo Ren Meizāsu)
Voiced by: Hidetoshi Nakamura
The former leader of Goetia, also Adelicia and Daphne's father. Oswald is hailed as the second coming of King Solomon, having accomplished the feat of summoning and commanding all seventy-two demons of the Ars Goetia. Feeling the limit of his magical study and with the provocation of the Dark Magician's society, Ophion, then Oswald surmised a magical theory that would allow a mage to consume a demon that they had summoned, breaking the taboo that forbids mages from becoming magic. Oswald himself attempted to become one with the Magic of Solomon but due to Gara's interference failed to consume all seventy-two Demons and as a result became corrupted by the taboo. Oswald was defeated by Itsuki's Glam Sight, which identified Oswald as true magic.
Gara (ガラ, Gara)
Voiced by: Keiji Fujiwara
A Latin youth with shoulder length bright red hair. Former Apprentice and Secretary of Goetia. An excellent Mage who can perform spells that normally need several people. Gara is a member of the Dark Mage's Society, Ophion and was the impetus behind Oswald's committing a Taboo. Gara himself committed the same taboo by using the formula derived by Oswald and consuming the Demon Flauros. Gara's betrayal of Goetia was exposed by Daphne and Sekiren who subsequently defeated him and expelled him from Goetia.

=== Association ===
Kagezaki (影崎, kagezaki)
Voiced by: Daisuke Ono
The Association's representative in charge of Astral and a prodigious Taoist magician. His appearance is rather ordinary. Kagezaki's responsibilities within the Association include the investigation of Taboos and the punishment of mages that commit them, earning him the nickname of the "Magician that punishes Magicians". Kagezaki's powers cannot be seen by Itsuki's Glam Sight, additionally Honami and Adilisia sensed terror when opposing him. Kuroha, however, is able to approach Kagezaki without fear. Kagezaki is portrayed as being cruel and uncaring. For example, Kagezaki was in possession with enough information to prevent the Summer Festival Incident. However, he chose to make his presence known only after the beginning of the ceremony, as he did during the original incident that left Moroha Minogi incapacitated for ten years, in order to fill a quota with the Association.
Kagezaki is undoubtedly a powerful mage, as seen during the Ophion incident where his power was seen as overwhelming, exceeding the common knowledge of Magic. Nekoyashiki is the only opponent to defeat Kagezaki in a one-on-one magic battle. In Astral's founding days he was invited to join by Tsukasa, at that time he is known as Daisuke Kashiwara (柏原 代介, his assumed name). He uses doujutsu(道術).
Fin Cruda (フィン・クルーダ, Fin Kurūda)
Voiced by: Mamoru Miyano
Another Magician of the Association, Fin was sent to investigate a possible Taboo connected to Itsuki being hidden by Astral. A Changeling who sports a shock of a blonde hair and blue eyes, also a Celtic Magician. Fin met Honami during her Celtic magic field training and they restored the dying Celtic magic. Fin was much like a teacher to Honami.
He is also a member of the Dark Mage's Ophion and, like Itsuki, possesses the Glam Sight in his eyes, a gift bestowed upon him after returning from the land of Fairies. As a changeling his Glam Sight is geared towards knowing the desires of others that he may aid in their fulfillment. In the Dragon Incident, in order to fulfill Honami's wish he unsealed the Dragon to which Itsuki is connected to in order to use it as a sacrifice in a ceremony that would remove the taint from Itsuki's Glam Sight eye. Fin's actions during the Dragon Incident were eventually thwarted by Astral, and Fin fled Furube before The Association could arrive. Fin is next seen searching for Honami's grandmother, Hazel Ambler, in Venezia, where he encountered Sekiren and a magic duel ensues.
Darius Levi (ダリウス・レヴィ, Dariusu Revi)
A Vice Representative of the Association. Darius is a high-level mage, able to summon Angels. In fact, Darius is actually Honami's father, having renounced the Ambler name. He has broken all ties with Honami and her grandmother, and because of that, little else is known about him.

=== Katsuragi family ===
Suzuka Katsuragi (葛城 鈴香, Katsuragi Suzuka)
Voiced by: Isobe Masako
The head of the Katsuragi family, a magic society of shinto practitioners. Also the grandmother of Mikan and Kaori. She refused to let Mikan return to Astral when Nekoyashiki brought Mikan back home. Though not being able to acknowledge this matter, Astral still picked up Katsuragis' request of the Katsuragi festival regarding the "oni extermination".
Kikyou Katsuragi (葛城 桔梗, Katsuragi Kikyō)
Voiced by: Rie Tanaka
Suzuka's daughter and mother of Kaori and Mikan. She died 3 years ago during the Katsuragi festival.
Kaori Katsuragi (葛城 香, Katsuragi Kaori)
Voiced by: Rie Kugimiya
Mikan's sister. Although a young girl of approximately ten years old, she speaks in a very old-fashioned phrasing.
Tatsumi Shitou (紫藤 辰巳, Shitō Tatsumi)
Voiced by: Kenta Miyake
A muscular youth with height of about 2 meters (6 ft 7 in). Born in Kobe, he practices a Kagura fighting style. One of the guardians of the direct descent of the head of the Katsuragi family. In the beginning, he was Kaori's guardian, but an incident that happened 3 years ago ended his guardian duty, and he left. He is called back when Mikan returns home.
Yuzuru Tachibana (橘 弓鶴, Tachibana Yuzuru)
A slender youth dressed in a white costume similar to that of a Kannushi. Besides Meigen, he also guards Kaori. He was Mikan's guardian, but due to the incident 3 years ago, he became Kaori's guardian.

=== Others (magic related) ===
Macgregor (マクレガー, Maguregaa)
He is a mustached English gentleman who wears a bowler hat. He is the teacher of Honami and Adilisia when they are students of the "School". He specializes in Egyptian magic, and he likes to conduct experiments in the "School's" laboratory.
Lapis (ラピス, Rapisu)
Voiced by: Kaori Nazuka
A young girl with crimson hair, fair skin, blue eyes and Eastern European looks. From the exterior she looks approximately 12 years old. Her emotions seem to be limited. She attaches "ani-sama" to the mention of Judaix. Her true identity is a homonculus familiar made by Judaix Tholoide. She has the Evil Eye ability, to capture the sight of the things to see.
Diana (ディアナ)
Voiced by: Risa Mizuno
The leader and president of the magic items provision corporation Trismegistus. She is a beauty who often dresses in black. Has been supplying Astral with magical items for several generations. She filed a request to Astral during the flower-thief incident.
Kei Isurugi (石動 圭, Isurugi Kei)
Voiced by: Takahiro Sakurai
A magic user who requests the star festival after being introduced to Astral by the Association. Kei is a youth with shoulder-length black hair wearing a rocket pendant. Also an Onmyouji like Nekoyashiki. Has a sister called Sakuya Isurugi.
Three years ago, he lost his sister due to an accident in the star festival. Flowing with complicated thoughts, he posted the request to Astral as an excuse to duel with Nekoyashiki, who is the remote cause of the failure that happened three years ago. Besides Onmyoudou, he uses Itsunahou also. After the ogre festival incident, he handed information of the conduct of Itsuki and the others to a person from the Association.
Sakuya Isurugi (石動 朔夜, Isurugi Sakuya)
Voiced by: Sanae Kobayashi
Kei's sister with a shoulder-length black hair. Nekoyashiki, who was to become successor to the sect which the Isurugi family is in, left. Sakuya executed the star festival in the place of Nekoyashiki, but it failed for certain reasons.
Shinogi Minagi (御凪 鎬, Minagi Shinogi)
Voiced by: Akemi Okamura
The Kannushi of a shrine. During the shrine's summer festival, she requested a rental from Astral. Her brother is Moroha Minagi.
After the summer-festival incident, she continued to train under her brother, Moroha. After that, the vessel spirit offering is filed to Astral as a request.
Moroha Minagi (御凪 諸刃, Minagi Moroha)
Voiced by: Yumiko Kobayashi
The elder brother of shrine successor Shinogi. Due to the failed ritual during the last summer festival, he fell into a sleeping state for ten years. After the summer festival incident, he overlooks his sister's training.
Cecilie (ツェツィーリエ, Tsetsirie)
A vampire and rune magic user.
Cecilie is a member of "Ophion", holding the position of "Kingdom (Malkuth)".
"Foundation (Yesod)"
The masked alchemist that holds the position of "Foundation (Yesod)" in "Ophion".
Melchiorre (メルキオーレ)
The necromancer holding the position of "Persistence (Netzach)" in "Ophion"

=== Others ===
Yuuka Kusakabe (日下部 勇花, Kusakabe Yūka)
A daughter of Itsuki's caretaker, Itsuki was under the care of Yuuka's parents when he was young. Yuuka treats Itsuki as her "big brother" and thinks of herself as his "little sister". Itsuki refers to her as a "sworn sibling". Yuuka and her parents know about Itsuki's Glam Sight. Currently because of her father's work, Yuuka and her family are in America. Even so, she plans to make overseas calls to Itsuki frequently.
Kazushi Yamada (山田 和志, Yamada Kazushi)
Itsuki's close childhood friend since primary school (self-proclaimed). Despite having a different family name, he is really the brother of Chidori Tomakomai. 8 years ago, by chance, Itsuki and Chidori got involved in a magic-contamination incident.
Shouko Kunugi (功刀 翔子, Kunugi Shōko)
Voiced by: Megumi Nasu
A friend of Itsuki and Honami, the well-liked class president. When her grandfather went missing, she found an Astral name card in his belongings and went to Astral for help. Because of that, she more or less understand the circumstances of her classmates, Itsuki, Honami and Adilisa.
Chidori Tomakomai (苫小牧 千鳥, Tomakomai Chidori)
The teacher in charge of the sick bay in the school which Itsuki attends. A woman who speaks in a shattered manner, always seen with cigarette and chocolate. Though having a different family name, she is really the older sister of Kazushi Yamada. For some reason, after the magic-contamination incident that happened eight years ago, she has been watching over Itsuki.

== Explanation of magic ==
In Rental Magica, paranormal abilities and acts by "spell power" (呪力, juryoku) are defined as "magic".

Celtic Magic
The magic used by a Druid – a priest of ancient Celtic society. It draws upon natural magic energy involving the power of the forest and rocks, with the use of sacred song, cyclobalanopsis, mistletoe, and a stone circle. This magic is passed down only by oral instruction. Additionally, the user must memorize numerous sacred songs and also have extensive magic knowledge. Honami revived this forgotten magic in two years, with the help of Fin Cruda. However, Honami's celtic magic is slightly different because she dislikes the original method. Original celtic magic uses sacrifices as a power source, while Honami uses witchcraft to draw upon the moon and the cone of power instead.
Celtic Magic Battle Chants
Hail! With the divine protection of the mistletoe which dwells in neither Heaven nor Earth, pierce through the calamity in the West! (Hail! Chi ni mo te ni mo aragaru yadoriki no kagobote, nishi no wazawa yo fudatte!)
Hail! Goddess of the forest, Las! Beautiful Dione! God of the plains, Fauni! Horned God Cernunnos! (Hail! Mori no megami, Las! Utsukushii Dione! Bokushin Fauni! Suno aru kami Keruno!)
With the cone of power, and imitating the temples I plead, bind the seeds of calamity to the earth, and hold it within your arms, unto the land from day till night! (Shin kara no en sui no moto, henkawa no shin ge ni narai te ware wa ko, waze wa i no hida ne o chi ni shibaretsuki, iro to yoru no haze no made, sono ure no naka ni, daka to me tomoe!)
Hail! We are the descendents of the spiritual tree; we are the holy people of the forest. With great sacrifice, from this deprivation, we are people who summon forth great power. (Hail! Ware wa rejin no matsurenai, ware wa segai no mori no tabi ni, ware wa idai naru ise omoide, sono ketsu gakuyoni, chikara o kunida san to sugimono nai)
I plead, that our offering may be accepted! (Ware wa onega, ware wa no kumutsu nanjira no te de uketo ra ren koto)
Like the harvested sprouts of grass, like the tides that come and go, like the winds that blow and go (Nebu ke kare no kusa no gotoku, yo sekai no nami no gotoku, ukite no kaze no gotoku)
King Solomon's Magic
There are two types: summoning magic conducting and evoking seventy-two demons, and amulet magic using seven planets' power which affect the seventy-two demons. Summoning magic uses a pot which seals demons within magic circles, triangles, pentagrams, hexagrams, and others. By conducting to high-rank demons, like Baal, Astaroth, Paimon, and Asmodai, the user can summon the lower-ranking demon than the demon they conduct. It is extremely difficult magic. Even if the users have first-class magic talent, they can usually summon only one kind of demon in their entire lives with the exception of the Mathers family. Only King Solomon and Oswald lenn Mathers succeeded in summoning all seventy-two demons. Adilisia has summoned about 20 kinds of demons. If the user makes a slight mistake while summoning, the demons will revolt against their master, possibly maiming or killing them.
Shinto
The magic which purifies all defilement with tamagushi, norito and kagura. It creates a very strong barrier. Moreover, it can enshrine and comfort gods and spirits. In the shinto territory, like the shrine, other magics become weakened, but shinto is weakened conversely outside Japan.
Onmyōdō
A synthetic magic which fused Yin and yang, Wu Xing, Feng shui, Vajrayana, Jyugondou, Folk religion and others. This magic user is good at controlling spell power accurately (for example, using many shikigami at the same time).
Alchemy
It is described similarly to common Alchemy.
Vajrayana
Buddhism magic which mixed with some other magic method. The user borrows the powers of Bodhisattva, Wisdom King and Deva by using mudra and mantra. Besides the user is good at direct physical attack with Buddhist prayer beads, khakkhara (shakujou), or a club.
Rune magic
It is described similarly to common Rune magic.

Magic Name	Magic Characteristic	Attack (魔術強度)	Defence (霊的加護)	Speed (術式速度)	Cost (呪詛対価)	Skill (呪的技術)	Danger (危険度)
Celtic magic	Descendant of Taliesin (霊樹の末裔)	3	2	2	2	4	2
Magic of King Solomon	Evocation of Solomon (王命の喚起)	5	1	1	4	5	5
Shinto	Absolute Purification (禊)	1	5	2	2	2	3
Onmyōdō or Shugendō	Formula of Five Elements (陰陽五行の式)	3	3	4	4	4	4
Poltergeist	Nothing (It is not strictly magic)	1–4	1–3	5	3–5	1	3–5
Alchemy	Metamorphic of Ether (万物の変成)	1	1	5	3	5	3
Vajrayana	Mandara of Dual World (両界曼荼羅)	4	3	3	4	2	2
Demonic eye (Glam sight)	It depends on the kind of demonic eye	1 – ?	1	3–5	3 – ?	1	3 – ?
Rune magic	Reginkunnr of Runa (秘文字の神性)	4	2	5	4	3	4
Necromancy	Golden Rule of Death (死の黄金律)						
Taoism	Taoism of Moderation (中庸なる道)	2	4	4	4	5	4
Exorcism	Protection of Holy Spirit (聖霊の加護)	4	4	3	4	2	4

== Media ==
=== Light novels ===
No.	Title	Japanese release date	Japanese ISBN
1	~Magic users, for rental! ~ Mahōtsukai, Kashimasu! (～魔法使い、貸します!)	August 31, 2004	978-4-04-424906-9
2	Magic user V.S. Alchemist! Mahōtsukai V.S. Renkinjutsu-shi! (魔法使いV.S.錬金術師!)	March 31, 2005	978-4-04-424907-6
3	The destiny of the magic user! Mahōtsukai, Tsudou! (魔法使い、集う!)	July 30, 2005	978-4-04-424908-3
4	Magic users, in training! Ryū to Mahōtsukai (竜と魔法使い)	November 30, 2005	978-4-04-424910-6
5	The ogre festival and the magic users (Part 1); Mahōtsukai no Shukumei! (魔法使いの宿命!)	December 28, 2005	978-4-04-424909-0
6	The ogre festival and the magic users (Part 2); Mahōtsukai, Shugyō-chū! (魔法使い、修行中!)	June 30, 2006	978-4-04-424911-3
7	Magic user classmate Oni no Matsuri to Mahōtsukai (ue) (鬼の祭りと魔法使い(上))	October 31, 2006	978-4-04-424912-0
8	Vampire V.S Magic user! Oni no Matsuri to Mahōtsukai (shita) (鬼の祭りと魔法使い(下))	November 30, 2006	978-4-04-424913-7
9	The magic user of the demon capital Mahōtsukai no Kurasumeito (魔法使いのクラスメイト)	December 28, 2006	978-4-04-424914-4
10	Magic book encyclopedia Kyūketsuki V.S. Mahōtsukai! (吸血鬼V.S.魔法使い!)	June 30, 2007	978-4-04-424915-1
An illustration collection with two short stories.
11	A Magic user's memories Yōto no Mahōtsukai (妖都の魔法使い)	September 29, 2007	978-4-04-424916-8
12	The magic users of the olden days Madōsho Taizen (魔導書大全)	November 30, 2007	978-4-04-424917-5
13	The magic user's little sister Mahōtsukai no Kioku (魔法使いの記憶)	December 28, 2007	978-4-04-424918-2
14	The magic users of the ancient capital Arishi hi no Mahōtsukai (ありし日の魔法使い)	March 29, 2008	978-4-04-424919-9
15	The ruined dragon and the magic users Mahōtsukai no Imōto (魔法使いの妹)	August 1, 2008	978-4-04-424920-5
16	The silver knight and the magic users Furuki-to no Mahōtsukai (旧き都の魔法使い)	February 28, 2009	978-4-04-424921-2
17	The white magic user Horobishi Ryū to Mahōtsukai (滅びし竜と魔法使い)	June 30, 2009	978-4-04-424922-9
18	The magic user's little sister, again Gin no Kishi to Mahōtsukai (銀の騎士と魔法使い)	January 30, 2010	978-4-04-424923-6
19	Conflicting magic users Shiro no Mahōtsukai (白の魔法使い)	June 30, 2010	978-4-04-424924-3
20	Magic users on the death line Mahōtsukai no Imōto, Futatabi (魔法使いの妹、再び)	January 29, 2011	978-4-04-424925-0
21	Last Magic users Sōran no Mahōtsukai-tachi (争乱の魔法使いたち)	July 30, 2011	978-4-04-424927-4
22	Magic users of the future Shisen no Mahōtsukai-tachi (死線の魔法使いたち)	January 31, 2012	978-4-04-424926-7
23	The last magic users Saigo no Mahōtsukai-tachi (最後の魔法使いたち)	July 31, 2012	978-4-04-100396-1
24	Magic users of the future Mirai no Mahōtsukai-tachi (未来の魔法使いたち)	March 30, 2013	978-4-04-100758-7

=== Manga ===
==== Rental Magica ====
No.	Japanese release date	Japanese ISBN
1	May 17, 2007	978-4-04-925044-2
2	October 17, 2007	978-4-04-925052-7
3	April 17, 2008	978-4-04-925059-6
4	January 17, 2009	978-4-04-925066-4
5	August 24, 2009	978-4-04-925069-5

==== Rental Magica from SOLOMON ====
No.	Japanese release date	Japanese ISBN
1	October 24, 2007	978-4-04-713978-7
2	April 24, 2008	978-4-04-715051-5

=== Anime ===
The anime series is shown out of chronological order, meaning that episode one chronologically occurs later in the series. This is quite similar to how The Melancholy of Haruhi Suzumiya was shown, although it is not stated as such in next episode previews. The anime uses four pieces of theme music; two opening themes and two ending themes. The first opening theme is "Sora ni Saku" (宇宙に咲く) by Lisa Komine, and the second opening theme is "Faith" by the same artist. The first ending theme is "Aruite Ikō." (歩いていこう。) by Jungo Yoshida, and the second ending theme is the same song sung by Astral no Mina-san in episodes twelve and twenty-one.
