= List of former WWE personnel =

WWE is an American professional wrestling promotion and entertainment company based in Stamford, Connecticut. Former employees in WWE consist of professional wrestlers, managers, valets, play-by-play and color commentators, announcers, interviewers, referees, trainers, script writers, executives, and members of the board of directors.

WWE talent contracts range from developmental contracts to multi-year deals. They primarily appeared on WWE television programming, pay-per-views, and live events, and talent with developmental contracts appeared at NXT (formerly Florida Championship Wrestling), or they appeared at WWE's former training facilities: Deep South Wrestling, Heartland Wrestling Association, International Wrestling Association, Memphis Championship Wrestling, Ohio Valley Wrestling, or others. When talent is released from their contract, it could be for a budget cut, the individual asking for their release, for personal reasons, or retirement. In some cases, talent has died while they were contracted, such as Brian Pillman, Owen Hart, Eddie Guerrero, Chris Benoit and Bray Wyatt.

Those who made appearances without a contract and those who were previously released but are currently employed by WWE are not included.

== Lists of former personnel ==
These lists of personnel are sorted by the first letter of the wrestlers' family name:

- List of former WWE personnel (A–C)
- List of former WWE personnel (D–H)
- List of former WWE personnel (I–M)
- List of former WWE personnel (N–R)
- List of former WWE personnel (S–Z)

== See also ==
- List of former championships in WWE
