= List of former WWE personnel (N–R) =

WWE is a sports entertainment company based in Stamford, Connecticut. Former employees (family name letters N – R) in WWE consist of professional wrestlers, managers, play-by-play and color commentators, announcers, interviewers, referees, trainers, script writers, executives, and board of directors.

WWE talents' contracts range from developmental contracts to multi-year deals. They primarily appeared on WWE television programming, pay-per-views, and live events, and talent with developmental contracts appeared at NXT (formerly Florida Championship Wrestling), or they appeared at WWE's former training facilities: Deep South Wrestling, Heartland Wrestling Association, International Wrestling Association, Memphis Championship Wrestling, or Ohio Valley Wrestling. When talent is released of their contract, it could be for a budget cut, the individual asking for their release, for personal reasons, time off from an injury, or retirement. In some cases, talent has died while they were contracted, such as Brian Pillman, Owen Hart, Eddie Guerrero, Chris Benoit, and Bray Wyatt.

Those who made appearances without a contract and those who were previously released, but are currently employed by WWE are not included.

== Alumni (N—R) ==
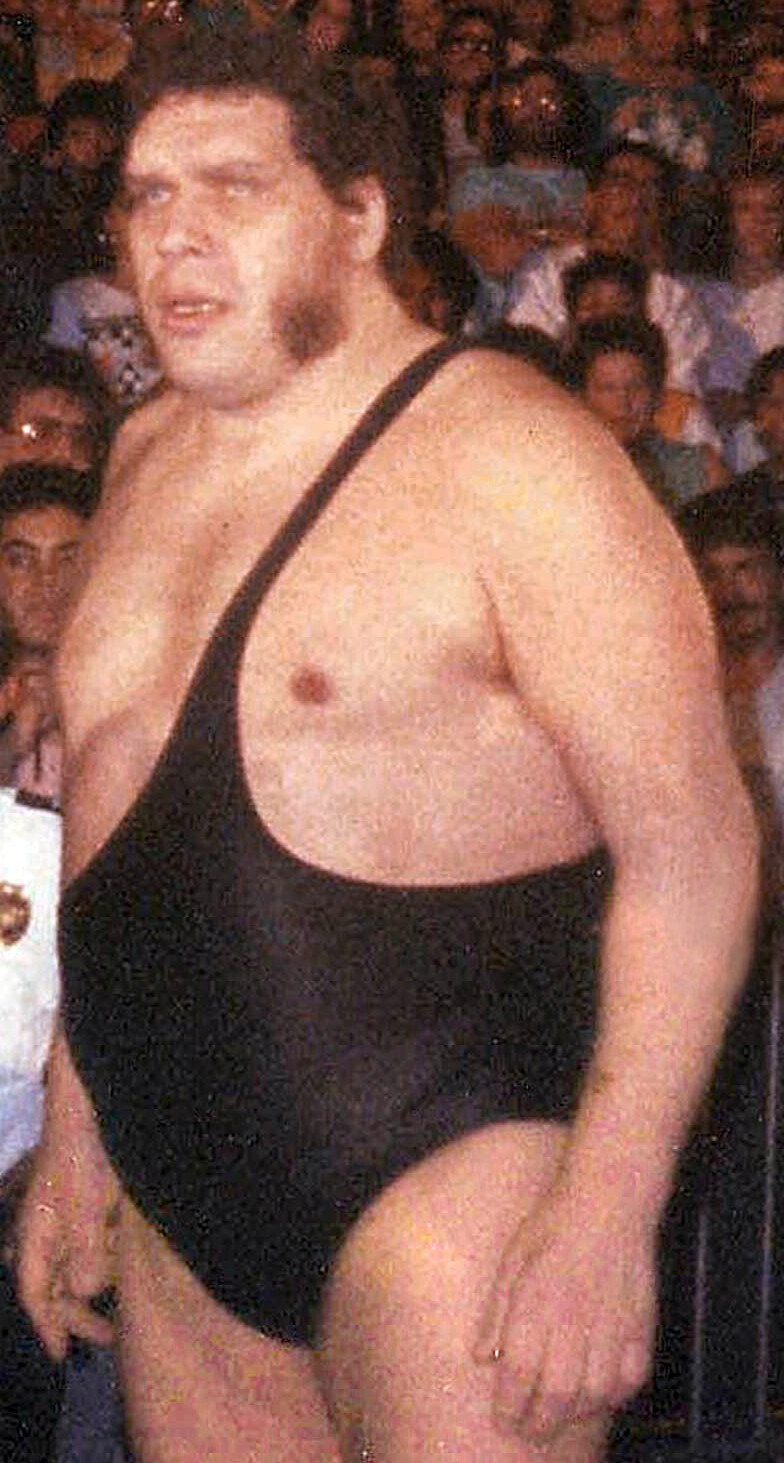
André the Giant

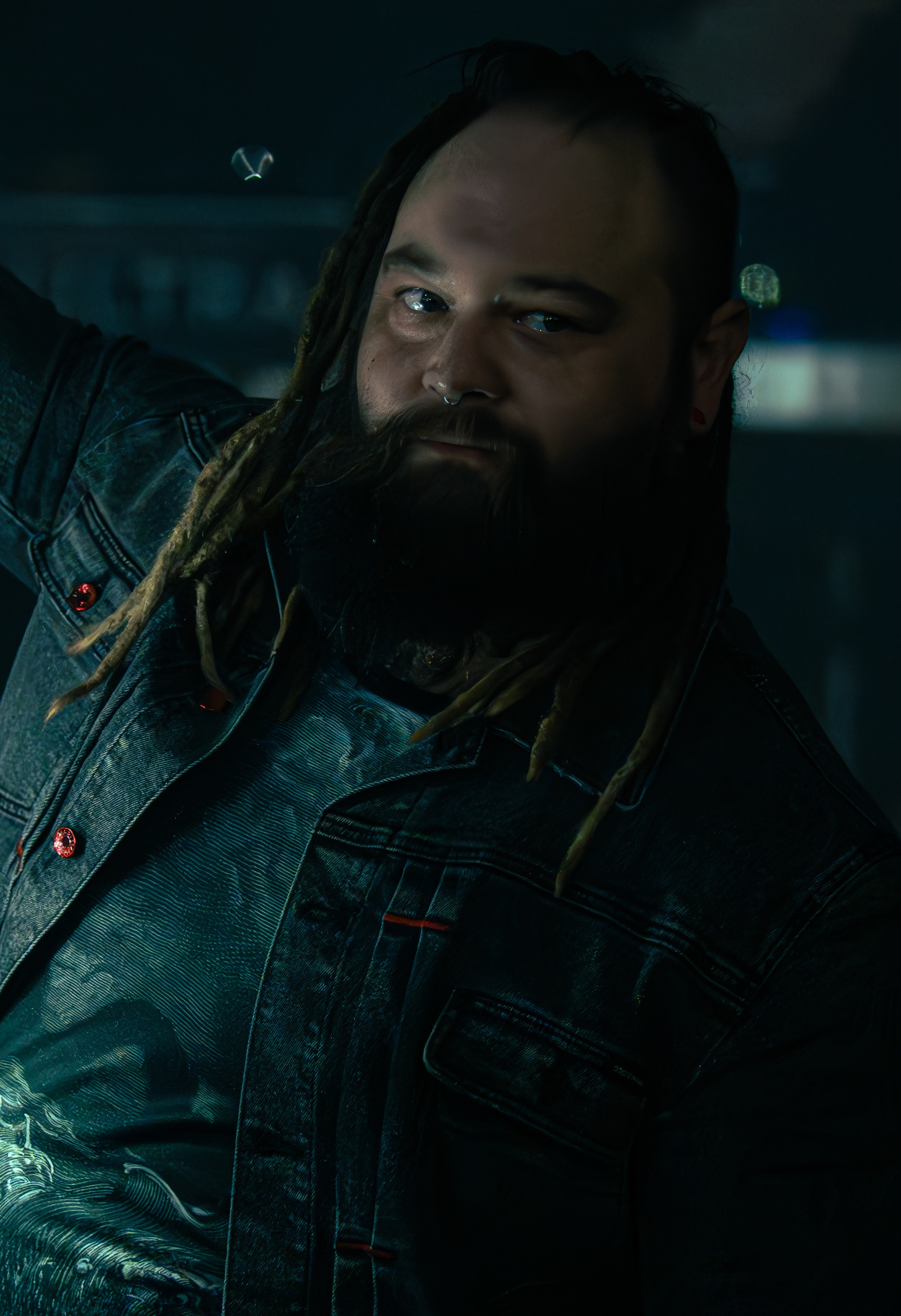
Bray Wyatt

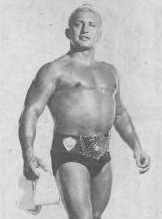
Buddy Rogers

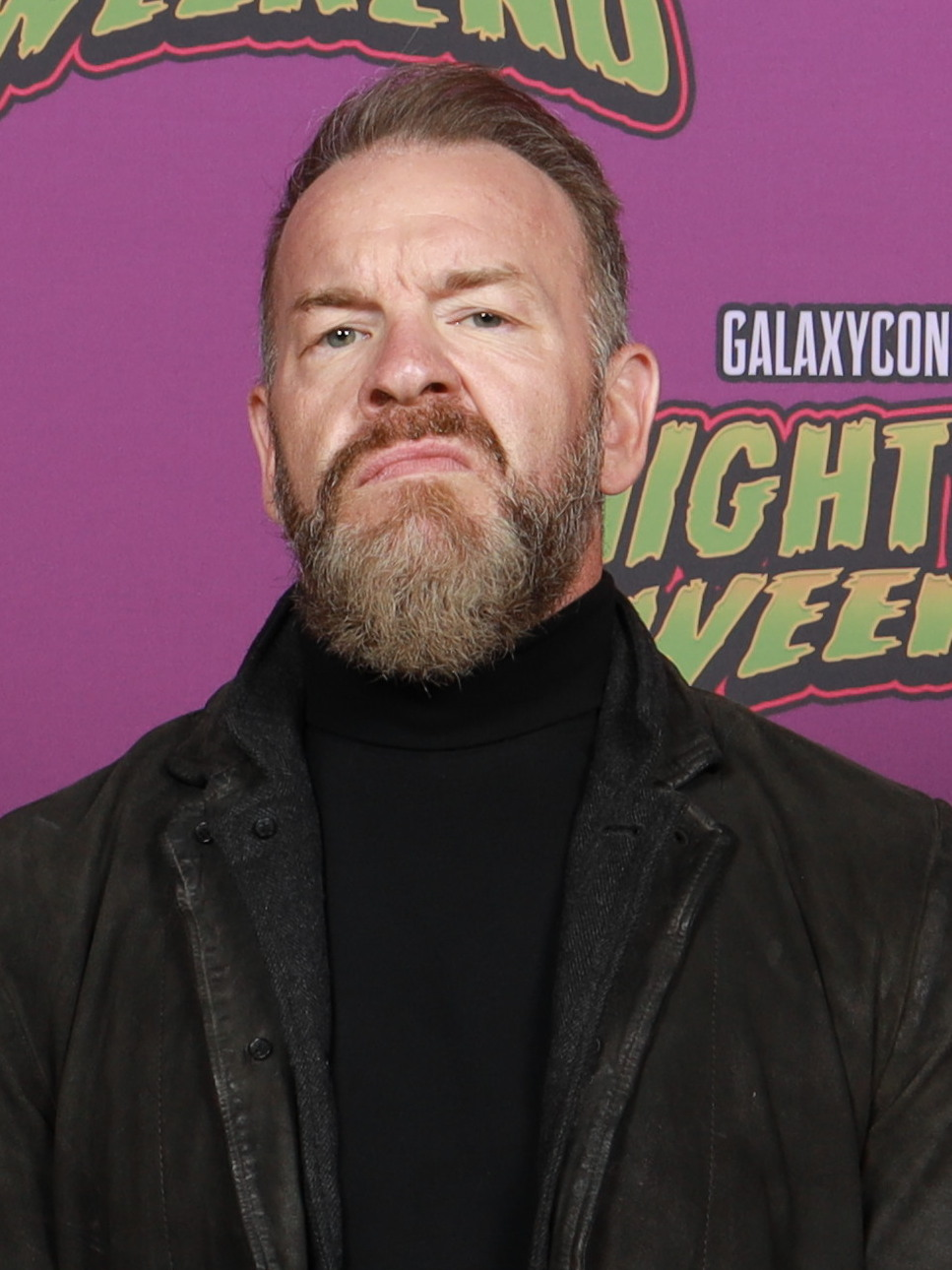
Christian

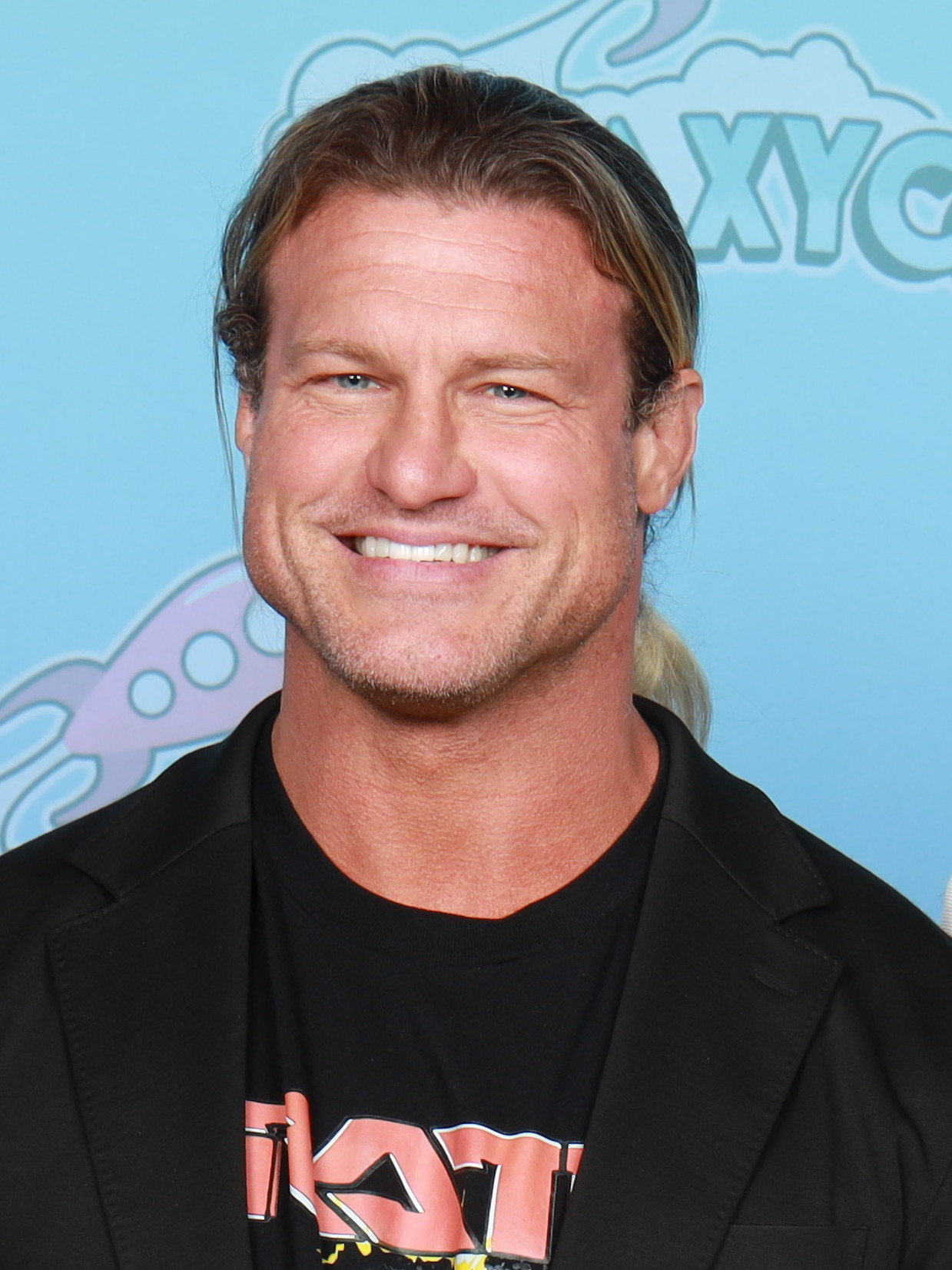
Dolph Ziggler

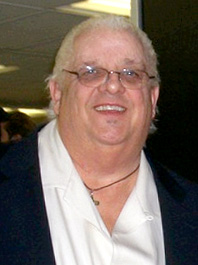
Dusty Rhodes

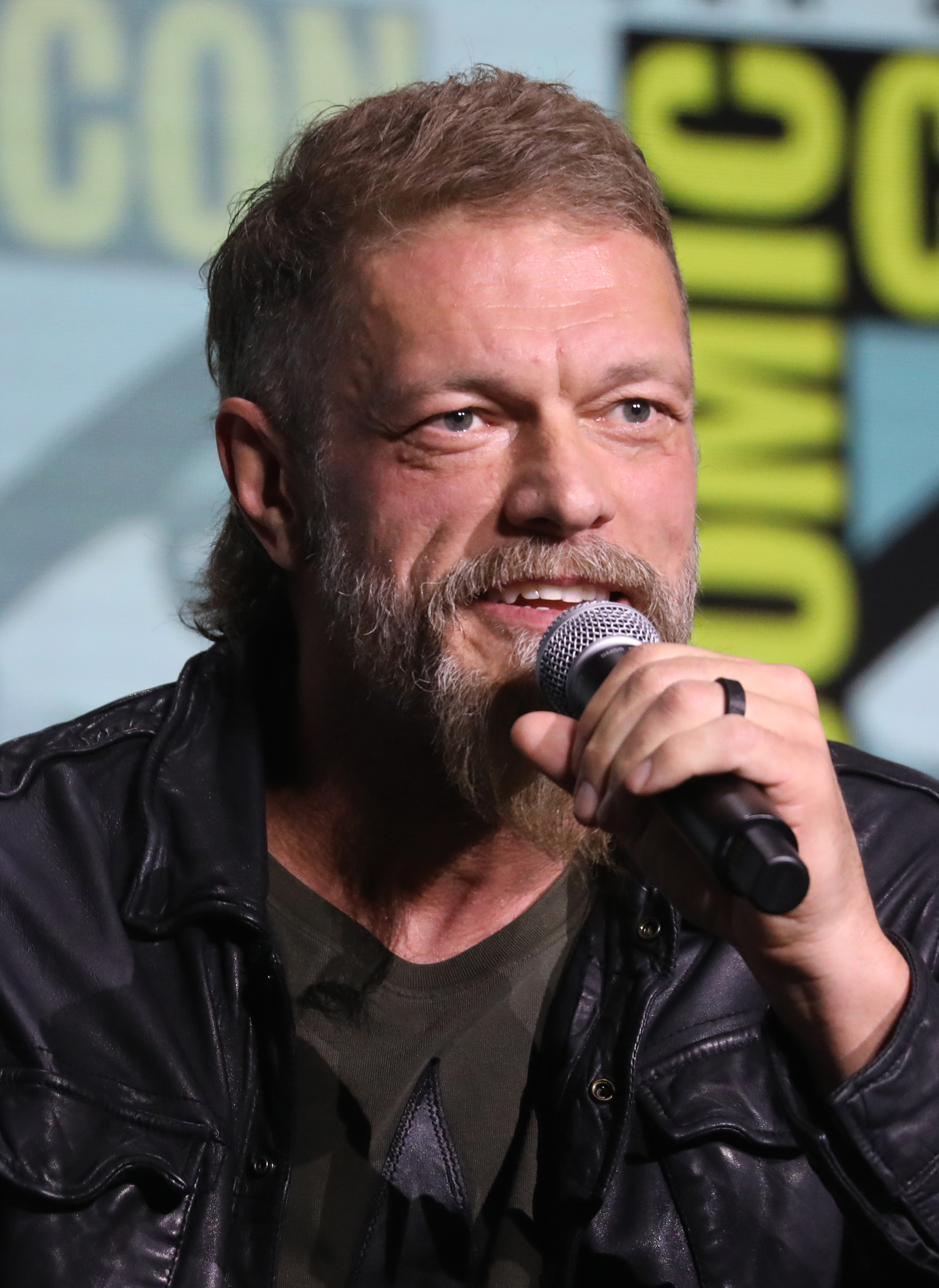
Edge

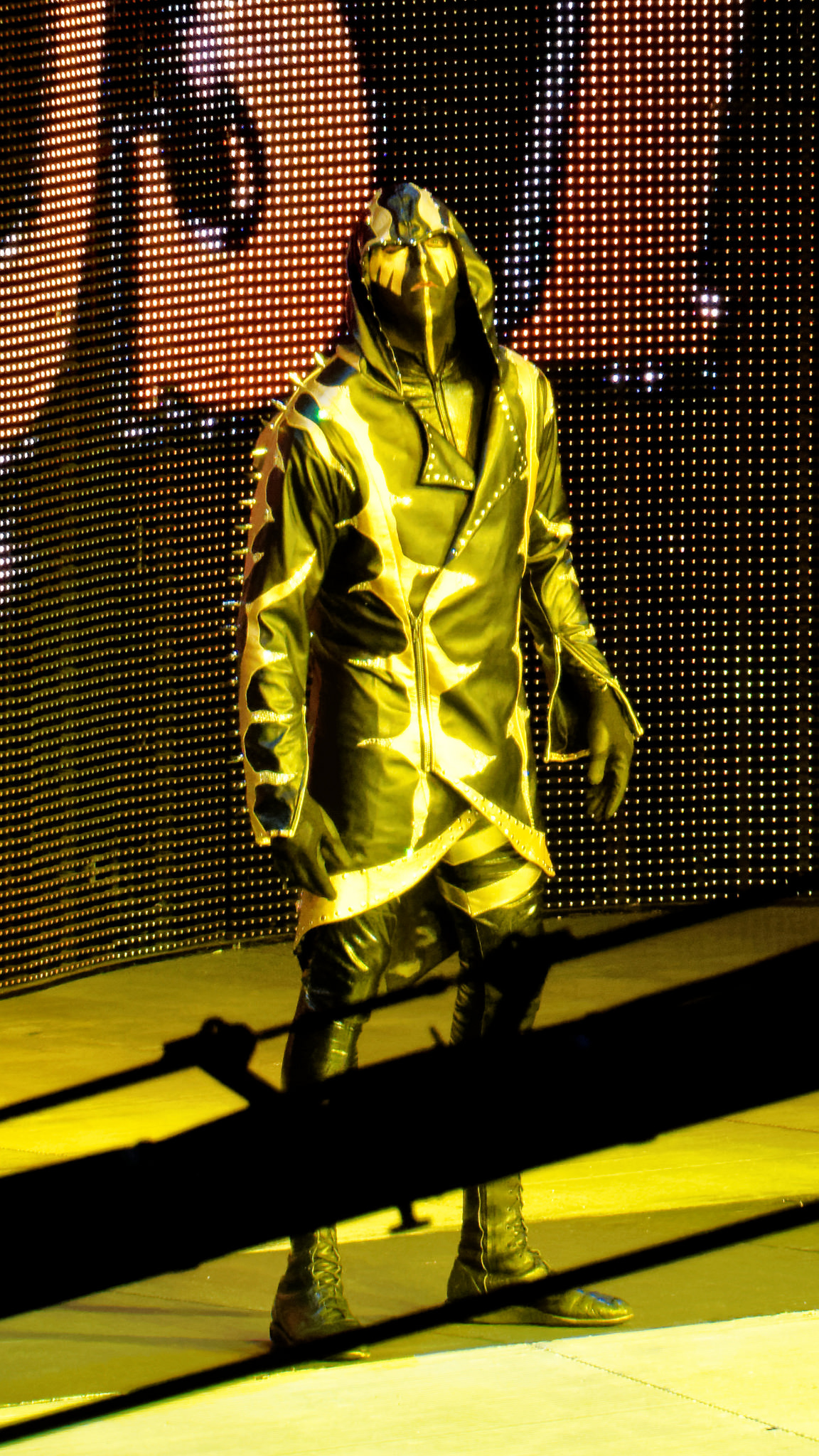
Goldust

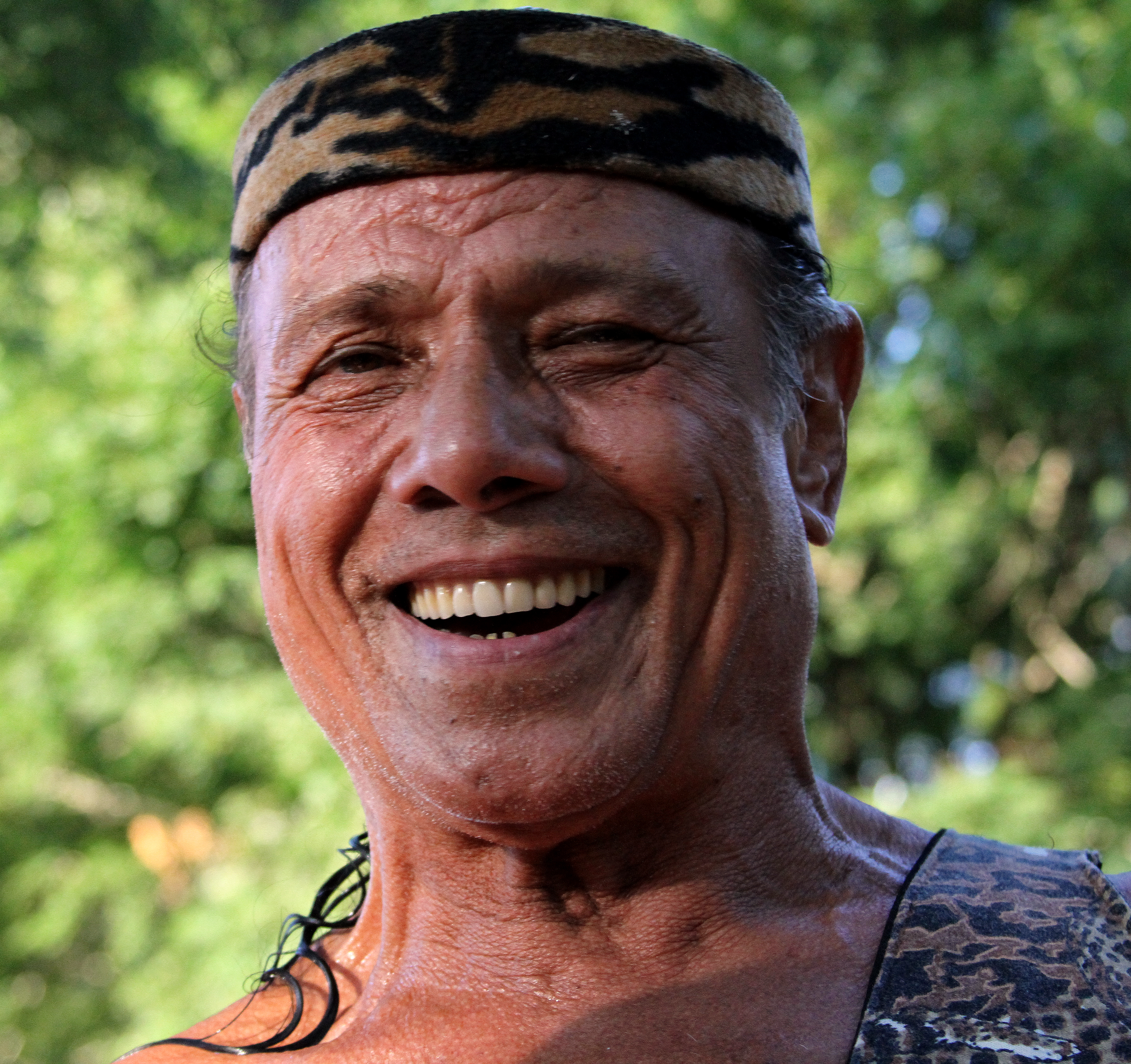
Jimmy Snuka

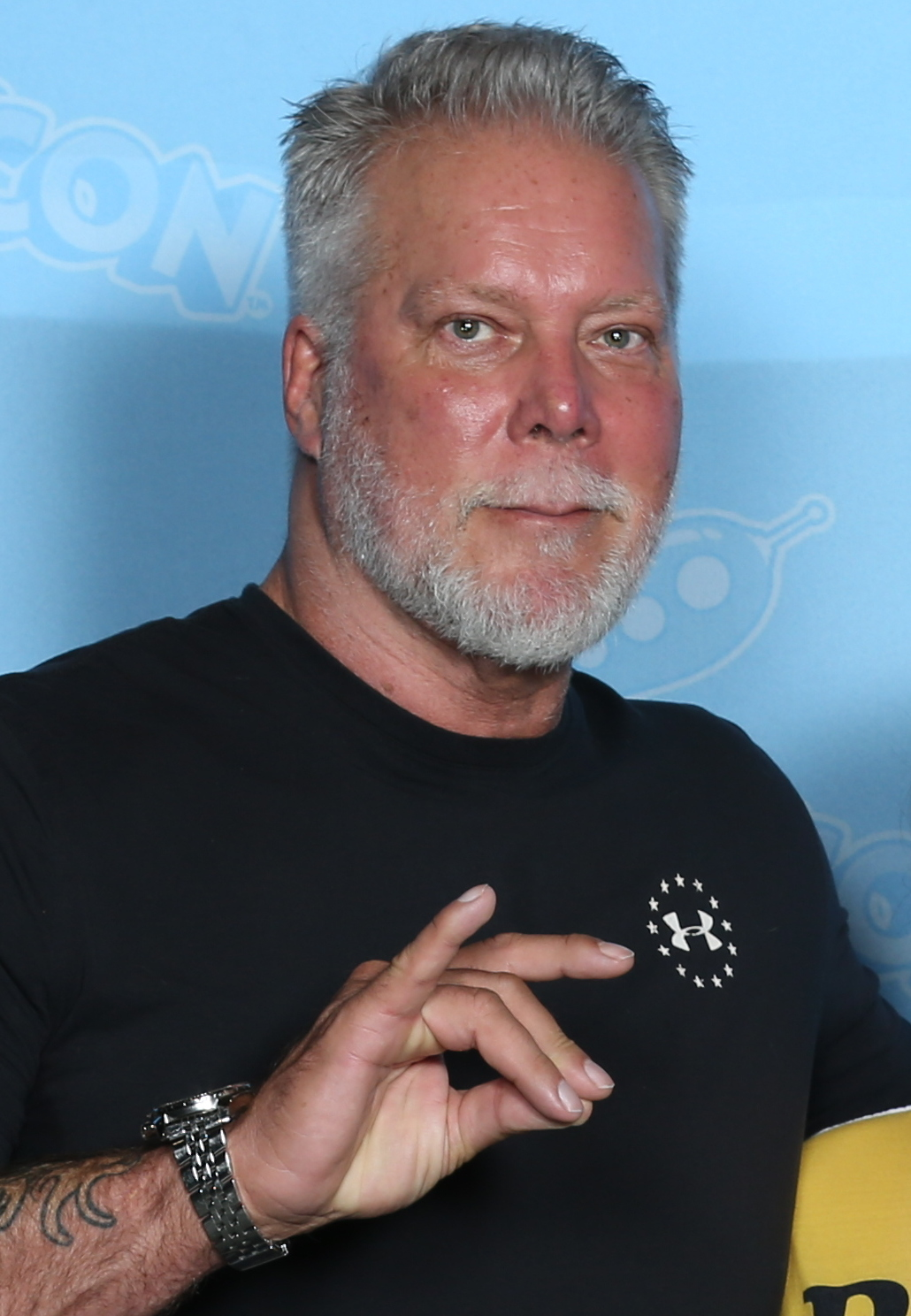
Kevin Nash

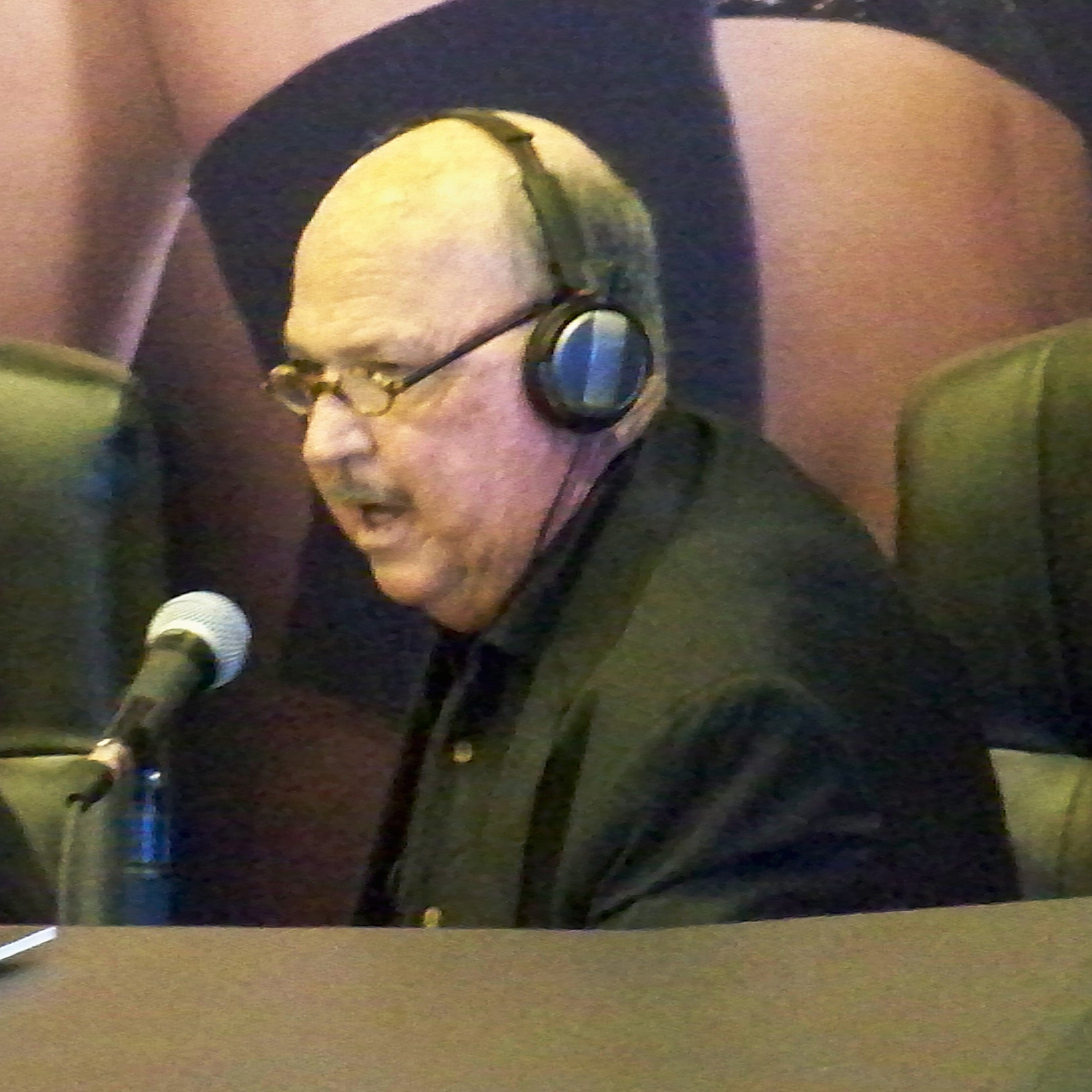
Gene Okerlund

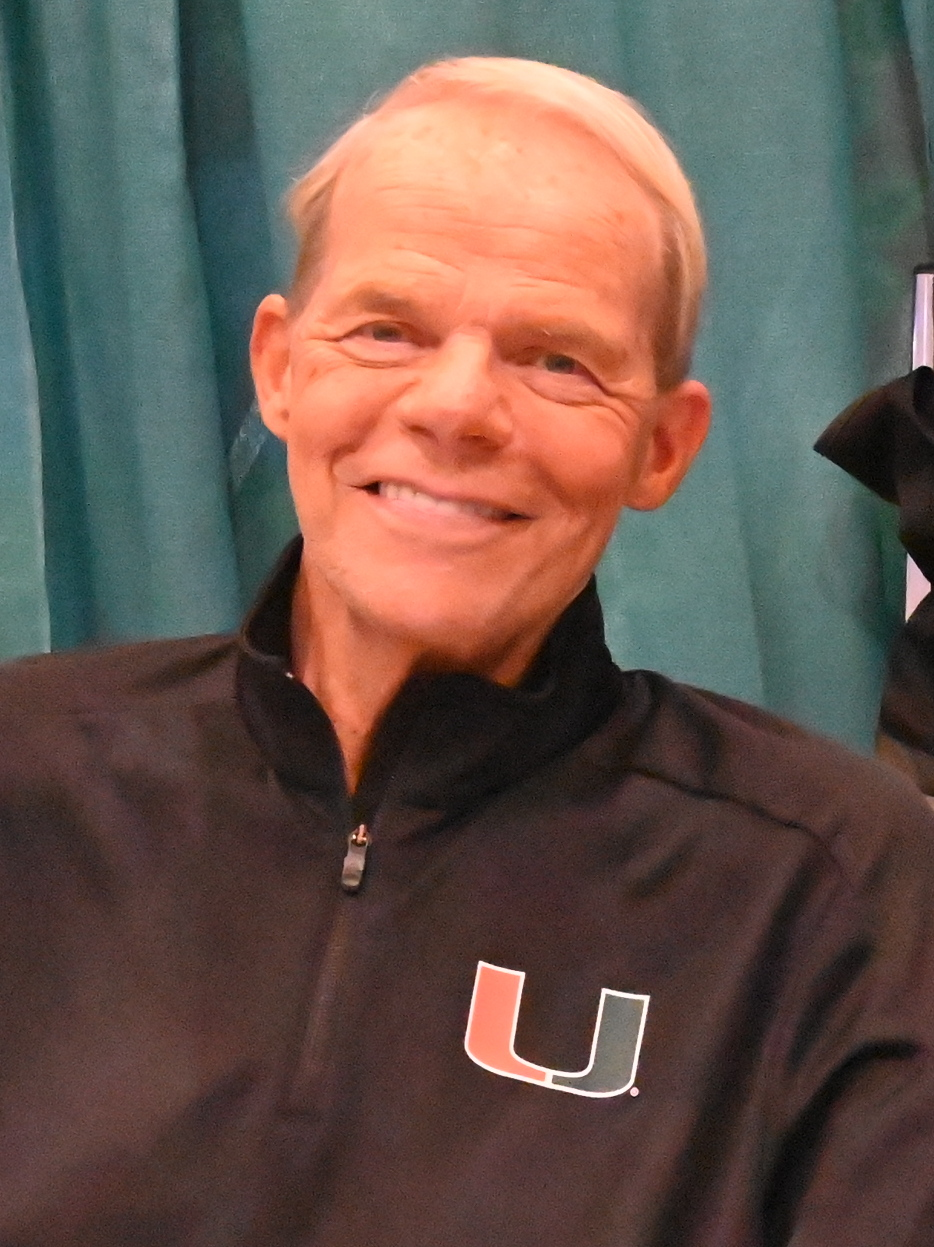
Lex Luger

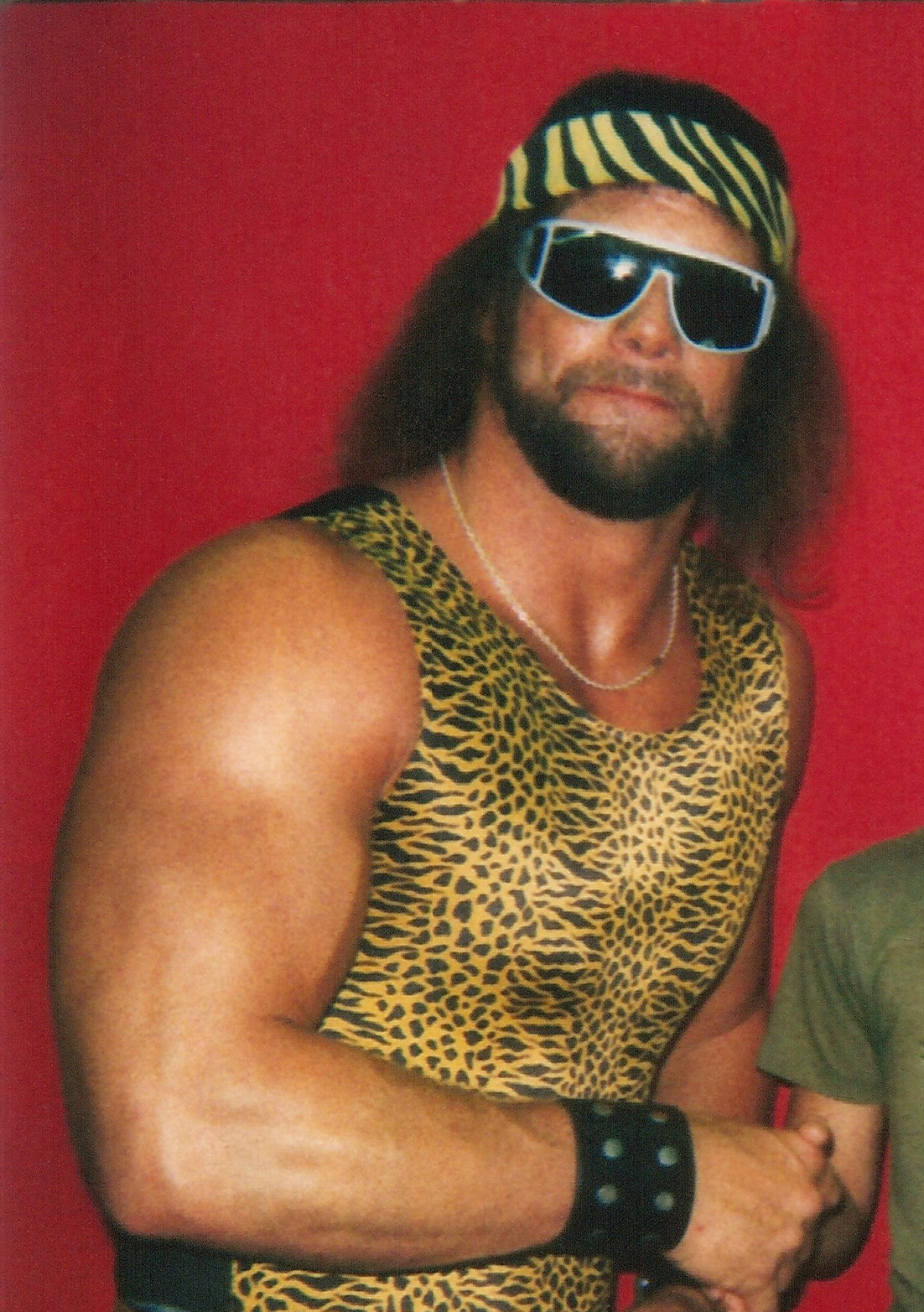
"Macho Man" Randy Savage

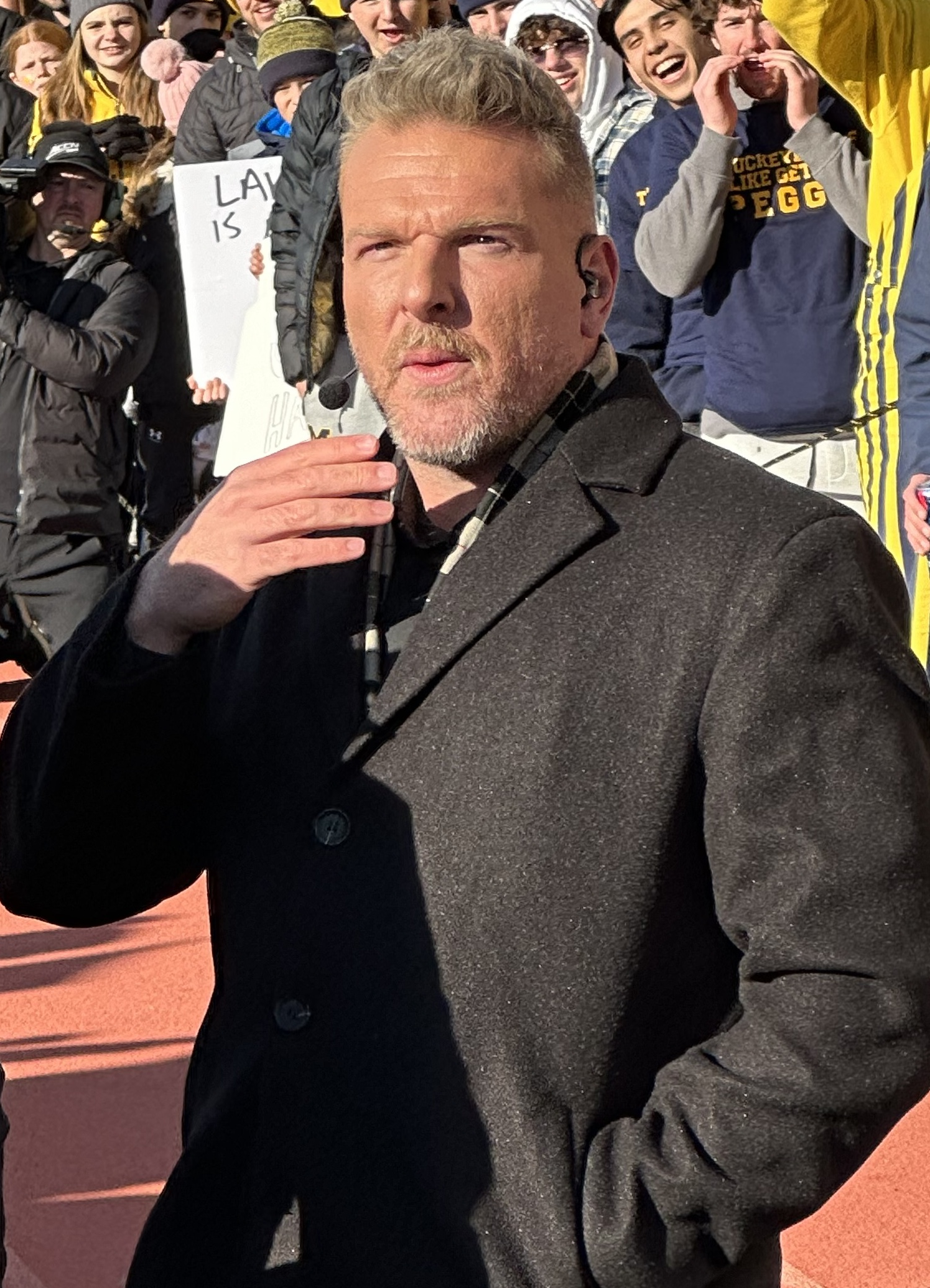
Pat McAfee

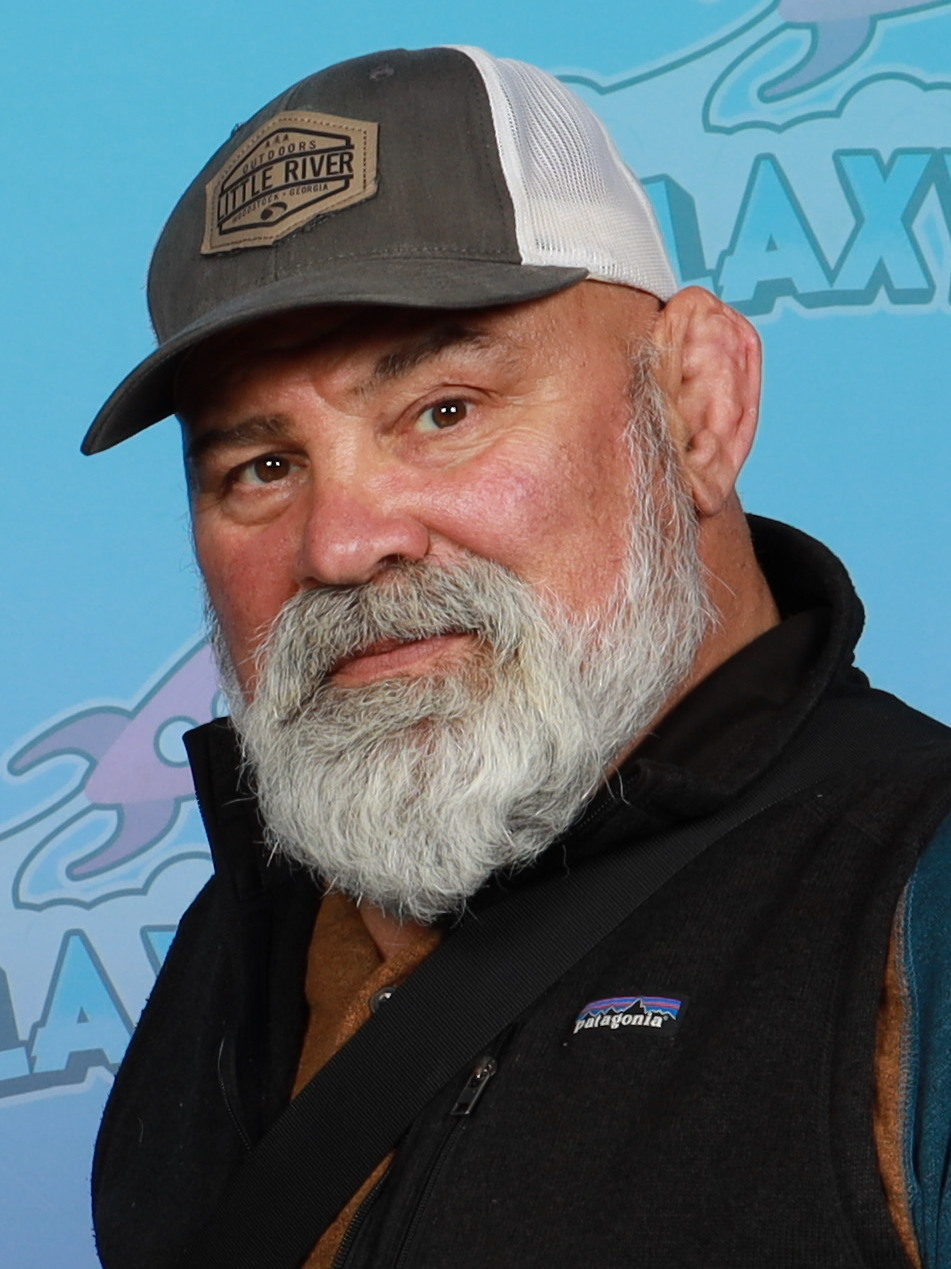
Rick Steiner

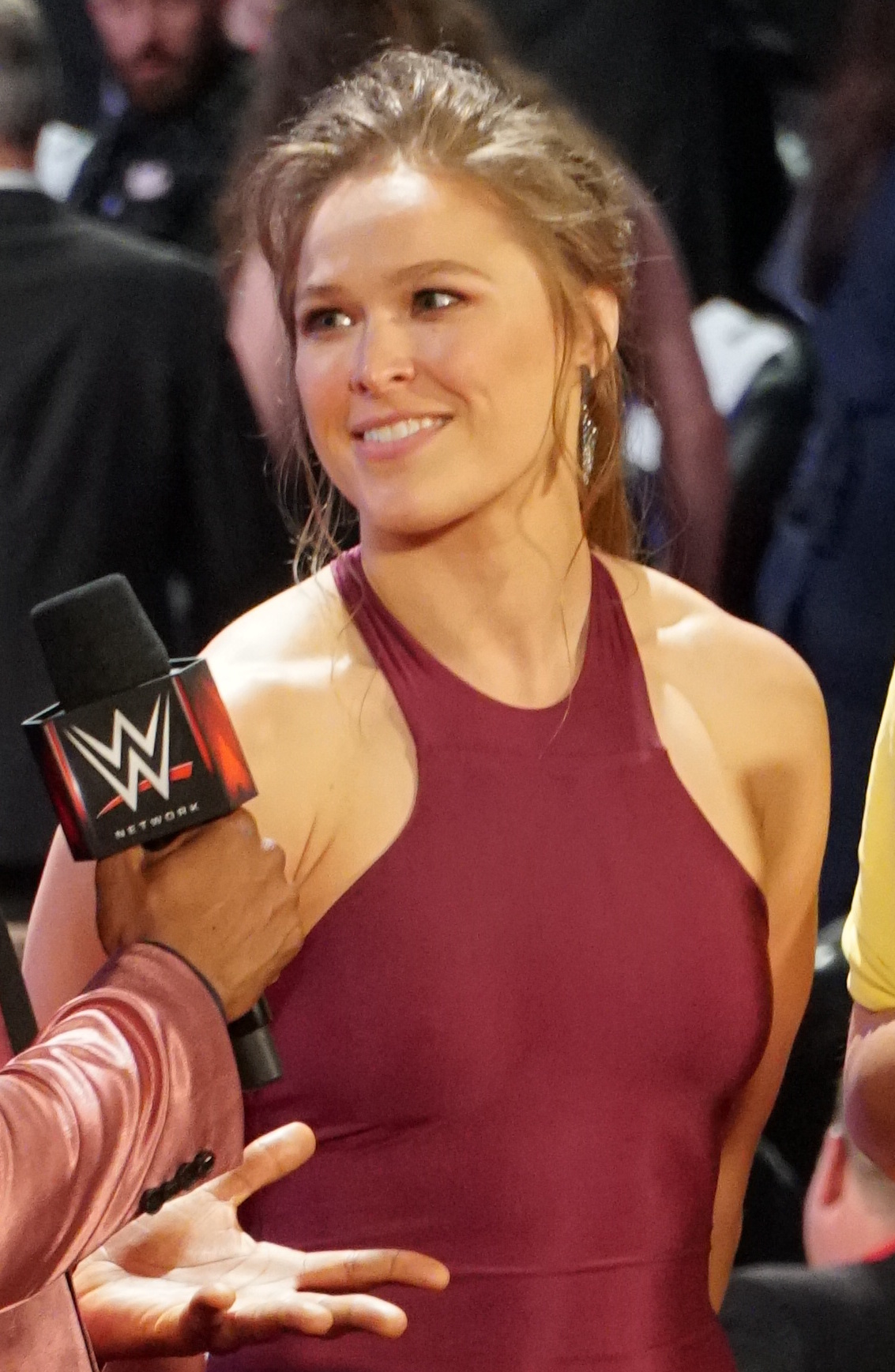
Ronda Rousey

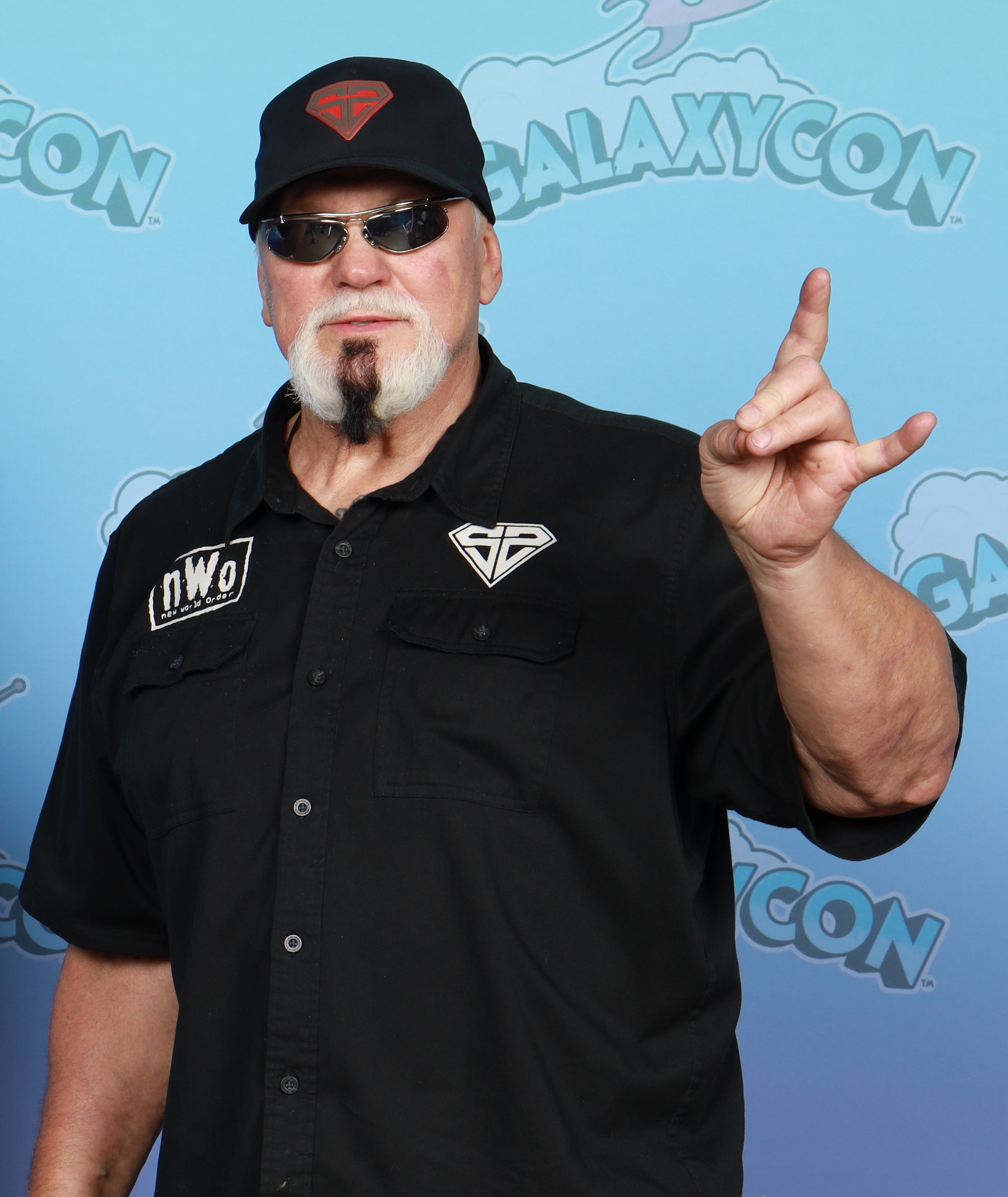
Scott Steiner

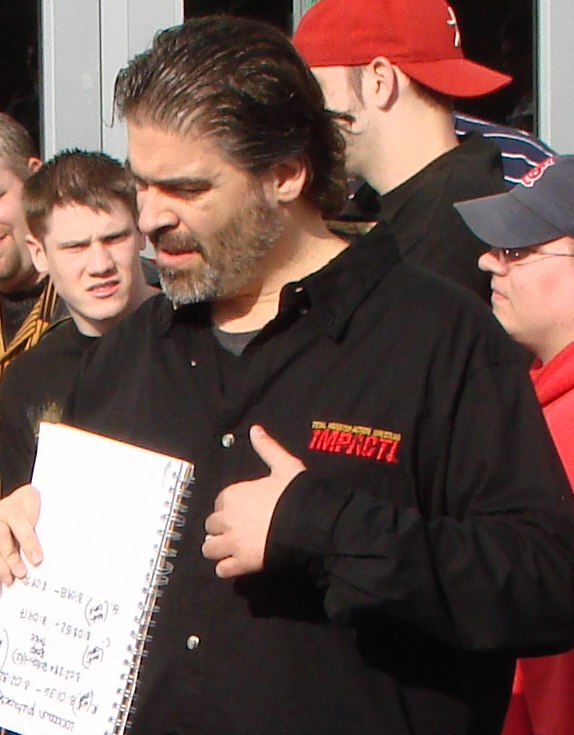
Vince Russo

Key
†	Indicates they are deceased
‡	Indicates they died while they were employed with WWE

Birth name	Ring name(s)	Tenure	Ref
Chigusa Nagayo	Chigusa Nagayo	1987	
Keiko Nakano	Bull Nakano	1994-1995	
Erika Nardini	Erika Nardini	2020-2022	
Kevin Nash	Kevin Nash; Diesel	1993–1996; 2002–2004; 2011; 2015	
Ezekwesiri Nduka Jr.	Ezra Judge	2019–2021	
James Neidhart ^{†}	Jim Neidhart; Who	1985–1992; 1994–1995; 1996–1997	
Natalie Nelson	Eva Marie	2013–2017; 2020–2021	
Nicholas Nemeth	Dolph Ziggler; Nicky; Nick Nemeth; Colonel Sanders	2004–2023	
Steve Nenoff	Tiger Nenoff	1950s	
Anthony Nese	Tony Nese	2016–2021	
Steffanie Newell	Luchadora the Explorer; Nixon Newell; Steffanie Newell; Tegan Nox	2017–2021; 2022–2024	
Alan Niddrie	Kenny Williams	2018–2022	
Brazo de Plata ^{†}	Super Porky	2005–2006	
John Nord	The Berzerker; The Viking	1991-1993	
Anthony Norris	Ahmed Johnson	1995–1998	
Christopher Nowinski	Christopher Nowinski; Chris Harvard	2001-2007	
Arda Ocal	Kyle Edwards	2014–2016	
Andrea Ocampo	Andrea D'Marco	2016–2017	
Homer O'Dell ^{†}	Homer O'Dell	1968	
Joseann Offerman	JoJo	2013–2021	
Eugene Okerlund ^{‡}	Gene Okerlund	1984-1993; 2001–2019	
Christy Olson	Christy St. Cloud	2017–2018	
Rickssen Opont	Tyson Dupont	2023–2026	
Paul Orndorff Jr. ^{†}	"Mr. Wonderful" Paul Orndorff	1983-1988	
Randal Orton ^{†}	Barry O	1984–1988	
Robert Orton Jr.	Bob Orton	1982; 1984–1987; 2005–2006	
Matthew Osborne ^{†}	Doink the Clown; Matt Borne	1985; 1992–1993; 1994–1995; 2001; 2003; 2007; 2012	
Vickie Otis	Princess Victoria	1983-1984	
Takeo Ōtsuka	Mens Teioh	1998	
Fred Ottman	Tugboat; Typhoon; Big Man Steele	1989–1993; 1994	
David Otunga	David Otunga	2008–2020	
Carl Ouellet	Jean Pierre LaFitte; Pierre	1993–1995; 1998	
Masashi Ozawa ^{†}	Killer Khan	1981; 1986–1987	
Christopher Pallies ^{†}	King Kong Bundy; Chris Canyon; Man Mountain Cannon	1981; 1985–1987; 1994–1995	
Adrienne Palmer	Ember Moon	2015-2021	
Omari Palmer	Odyssey Jones	2019–2024	
Charles Palumbo	Chuck; Chuck Palumbo	2001–2004; 2006–2008	
Michael Pappas ^{†}	Mike Pappas	1971-1974	
Ryan Parmeter	Conor O'Brian; Konnor; Ryan O'Reilly	2005–2007; 2010–2019	
Kenneth Patera	Ken Patera	1977–1978; 1980; 1984–1985; 1987–1988	
Jayson Paul	The Neighborhoodie; JTG	2006–2007; 2008–2014	
Kris Pavone	Caylen Croft	2003-2006; 2008-2010	
Brandi Pawalek	Brandi Lauren; Skyler Story	2020–2021	
Michael Penzel ^{†}	Corporal Kirchner; RT Reynolds	1985–1987	
Al Perez	Al Perez	1989-1990	
Eric Pérez	Eric Escobar; Eric Perez	2005-2010	
Karlee Perez	Maxine	2009–2012	
Melina Perez	Melina	2002–2011	
Miguel Pérez ^{†}	Miguel Perez	1957-1968	
Miguel Pérez Jr.	Miguel Perez Jr.	1997—1999	
Joseph Perkins ^{†}	Joseph Perkins	1999–2016	
Theodore Perkins	TJ Perkins; TJP	2016–2019	
Oreal Perras ^{†}	Ivan Koloff; Ivan Zukoff	1963; 1969–1971; 1975–1976; 1978–1979; 1983	
Catherine Perry	Lana	2013–2021	
Paul Perschmann ^{†}	"Playboy" Buddy Rose; The Executioner	1982–1983; 1984–1985; 1990–1991	
Josip Peruzović ^{†}	Nikolai Volkoff; Bepo Monogol; Executioner #3	1970–1971; 1974; 1976–1980; 1984–1990; 1991–1992; 1994–1995; 2001; 2007; 2010	
Dean Peters ^{†}	Battle Kat; Brady Boone	1986-1991	
Desiree Petersen	Desiree Peterson	1984–1985; 1988	
Darryl Peterson	Man Mountain Rock; Blacksmith	1994–1995	
Gene Petit ^{†}	Cousin Luke	1984–1987	
Todd Pettengill	Todd Pettengill	1993-1997	
Theodore Petty ^{†}	Rocco Rock	1999	
Lawrence Pfohl	Lex Luger; The Narcissist	1993–1995	
Michel Pigeon^{†}	Headbanger Jos Leduc	1988	
Brian Pillman ^{‡}	Brian Pillman	1996–1997	
Terri Poch	Tori	1998-2001	
Pat McAfee	Pat McAfee	2018-2026	
Lanny Poffo ^{†}	The Genius "Leaping" Lanny Poffo	1985–1992	
Randy Poffo ^{†}	"Macho Man" Randy Savage; Mr. Madness	1985–1994	
Luc Poirier	Sniper; Luc Poirier; Poirier	1985; 1997–1999	
Gilles Poisson	Louis Cyr; Gilles "The Fish" Poisson	1976; 1985	
Peter Polaco	Aldo Montoya; Justin Credible; PJ Walker	1993–1997; 2001–2003; 2006	
Michael Polchlopek	Bart Gunn; Bodacious Bart	1993-1999	
Dylan Postl	Hornswoggle; La Vaca; La Vaquita; Little Bastard; Mini Gator	2006–2016	
Alexander Pourteau	Alex "The Pug" Porteau	1996-1997	
Garfield Portz	Scott McGhee	1985-1987	
Dori Prange	Heidi Lovelance; Ruby Riott	2016–2021	
Thomas Prichard	Dr. Tom Prichard; Zip; Dr.X	1993–2004; 2007–2012	
Beatrice Priestley	Blair Davenport	2021–2025	
Frederick Prinze Jr.	Freddie Prinze Jr.	2008–2009; 2010–2012	
James Prudhomme ^{†}	Brute Bernard	1962–1964	
Oleg Prudius	Vladimir Kozlov; Oleg Prudius	2006–2011	
Dawn Psaltis	Dawn Marie	2002–2005	
Daniel Puder	Daniel Puder	2004-2005	
Antonio Pugliese ^{†}	Tony Parisi; Antonio Pugliese	1966–1969; 1975–1976; 1982; 1985	
Deonna Purrazzo	Deonna Purrazzo	2014–2020	
John Quinn ^{†}	Virgil the Kentucky Butcher	1967-1969	
Harley Race ^{†}	"Handsome" Harley Race "King" Harley Race; Great Mortimer	1963; 1980; 1986–1989	
Kayleigh Rae	Kay Lee Rae; Alba Fyre	2019–2026	
Michael Rallis	Riddick Moss; Madcap Moss	2014–2023	
Manuel Ramos ^{†}	Apache Bull Ramos	1968	
Dalip Rana	The Great Khali	2006–2014; 2017; 2018	
Mauro Ranallo	Mauro Ranallo	2015–2020	
James Raschke	The Baron; Baron Von Raschke	1977; 1988	
Jonathan Rechner ^{†}	Balls Mahoney; Xanta Klaus; Jon Rechner	1992; 1995–1996; 2005; 2006–2008	
Robert Rechsteiner	Rick Steiner	1992–1994	
Scott Rechsteiner	Scott Steiner	1992–1994; 2002–2004	
Brandi Reed	Eden Stiles	2011; 2013–2016	
Bruce Reed ^{†}	"The Natural" Butch Reed	1986–1988	
Ryan Reeves	Ryan Reeves; Skip Sheffield; Ryback	2004–2007; 2008–2016	
Matthew Rehwoldt	Aiden English	2012–2020	
James Reiher ^{†}	"Superfly" Jimmy Snuka; Silver Shadow	1982–1985; 1989–1992; 1993; 2002–2015	
Robert Remus	Sgt. Slaughter	1980–1981; 1983–1984; 1990–1994; 1997–2009	
Ken Resnick	Ken Resnick	1986–1987	
William Reso	Christian	1998–2005; 2009–2015	
Jack Reynolds ^{†}	Jack Reynolds	1984–1985	
Adam Copeland	Edge	1998–2011; 2020–2023	
Tom Ricca	Tony Ricca	1991	
Victoria Richter	Wendi Richter	1982; 1983–1985	
Harry Del Rios	Phantasio; Spellbinder	1995	
Frank A. Riddick III	Frank A. Riddick III	2008–2023	
Matthew Riddle	Matt Riddle; Riddle	2018–2023	
Sylvester Ritter ^{†}	Junkyard Dog	1984-1988	
Juan Rivera	Kwang; Savio Vega	1994—1998	
Karissa Rivera	Elektra Lopez	2021–2025	
Victor Rivera	Victor Rivera	1964-1965; 1968–1975; 1976; 1978–1979; 1982–1984; 1989	
Joseph Rizzo ^{†}	Jack Reynolds	1984—1985	
Justin Roberts	Justin Roberts	2002–2014	
Byron Robertson ^{†}	The Missing Link	1985	
Kevin Robertson	Keanu Carver	2023–2026	
Guadalupe Robledo ^{†}	Jose Lothario	1996–1997	
Daniel Rodimer	Dan Rodman	2006-2007	
Aaron Rodríguez	Mil Máscaras	1972–1973; 1977–1978; 1981; 1984; 1997	
José Rodríguez Chucuan	Alberto Del Rio	2009–2014; 2015–2016	
Emanuel Rodriguez	Kalisto	2013–2021	
Jesús Rodríguez	Ricardo Rodriguez; El Local	2010–2014	
Johnny Rodriguez	Johnny Rodz	1965–1985	
Herman Rohde Jr. ^{†}	"Nature Boy" Buddy Rogers	1953–1963; 1982–1983	
Todd Romero	Steve Romero	2004-2007	
Richard Rood ^{†}	"Ravishing" Rick Rude	1987–1990; 1997	
Giovanni Roselli	Romeo	2005–2006	
Toni Rossall	Toni Storm	2017–2021	
Frederick Rosser III	Darren Young	2005–2017	
James Ross	Jim Ross	1993–1994; 1994–2013; 2017–2019	
Irwin Roth ^{†}	The Grand Wizard of Wrestling	1972-1983	
Lawrence Rotunda	IRS; Mike Rotundo	1984-1986; 1991–1995; 2006–2020	
Taylor Rotunda	Bo Dallas; Uncle Howdy	2008–2021; 2022–2026	
Windham Rotunda ^{‡}	Duke Rotundo; Husky Harris; Bray Wyatt "The Fiend" Bray Wyatt; The Fiend	2009–2021; 2022–2023	
Justin Rocheleau	Justin "The Ox" LaRouche; Bam Neely	2008-2009	
Milena Roucka	Rosa Mendes	2006–2017	
Jacques Rougeau Jr.	The Mountie	1985–1994; 1998	
Raymond Rougeau	Raymond Rougeau	1985-1990; 1992–2002; 2017–2021	
Ronda Rousey	Ronda Rousey	2018–2023	
André Rousimoff ^{†}	André the Giant; The Giant Machine	1973–1991	
Chad Rowan ^{†}	Akebono	2005	
Joseph Ruby	Joe Gacy	2020–2026	
Breanna Ruggiero	Brinley Reece	2022–2026	
Ilja Rukober	Ilja Dragunov	2019–2026	
Dustin Runnels	Goldust; Dustin Rhodes; The Artist formerly known as Goldust	1990–1991; 1995–1999; 2001–2003; 2005–2006; 2008–2012; 2013–2019	
Terri Runnels	Marlena; Terri Runnels	1996–2004	
Virgil Runnels Jr. ^{‡}	Dusty Rhodes	1977-1979; 1980-1981; 1989–1991; 2005–2015	
Vincent Russo	Vince Russo; Vic Venom	1992–1999; 2002	
Glenn Ruth	Headbanger Thrasher; Glenn Ruth; Royal Spider	1990–1993; 1995–2000; 2016	
Joseph Ruud	Erick Rowan; Rowan	2011–2020; 2024–2026	

== See also ==
- List of WWE personnel
