= List of former WWE personnel (A–C) =

WWE is a professional wrestling company based in Stamford, Connecticut. Former employees (family name letters A-C) in WWE consist of professional wrestlers, managers, play-by-play and color commentators, announcers, interviewers, referees, trainers, script writers, executives and board of directors. WWE talents' contracts range from developmental contracts to multi-year deals. They primarily appeared on WWE television programming, pay-per-views, and live events, and talent with developmental contracts appeared at NXT (formerly Florida Championship Wrestling), or they appeared at WWE's former training facilities: Deep South Wrestling, Heartland Wrestling Association, International Wrestling Association, Memphis Championship Wrestling or Ohio Valley Wrestling. When talent is released of their contract, it could be for a budget cut, the individual asking for their release, for personal reasons, time off from an injury or retirement. In some cases, talent has died while they were contracted, such as Brian Pillman, Owen Hart, Eddie Guerrero, Chris Benoit and Bray Wyatt.

Those who made appearances without a contract and those who were previously released but are currently employed by WWE are not included.

== Alumni (A–C) ==
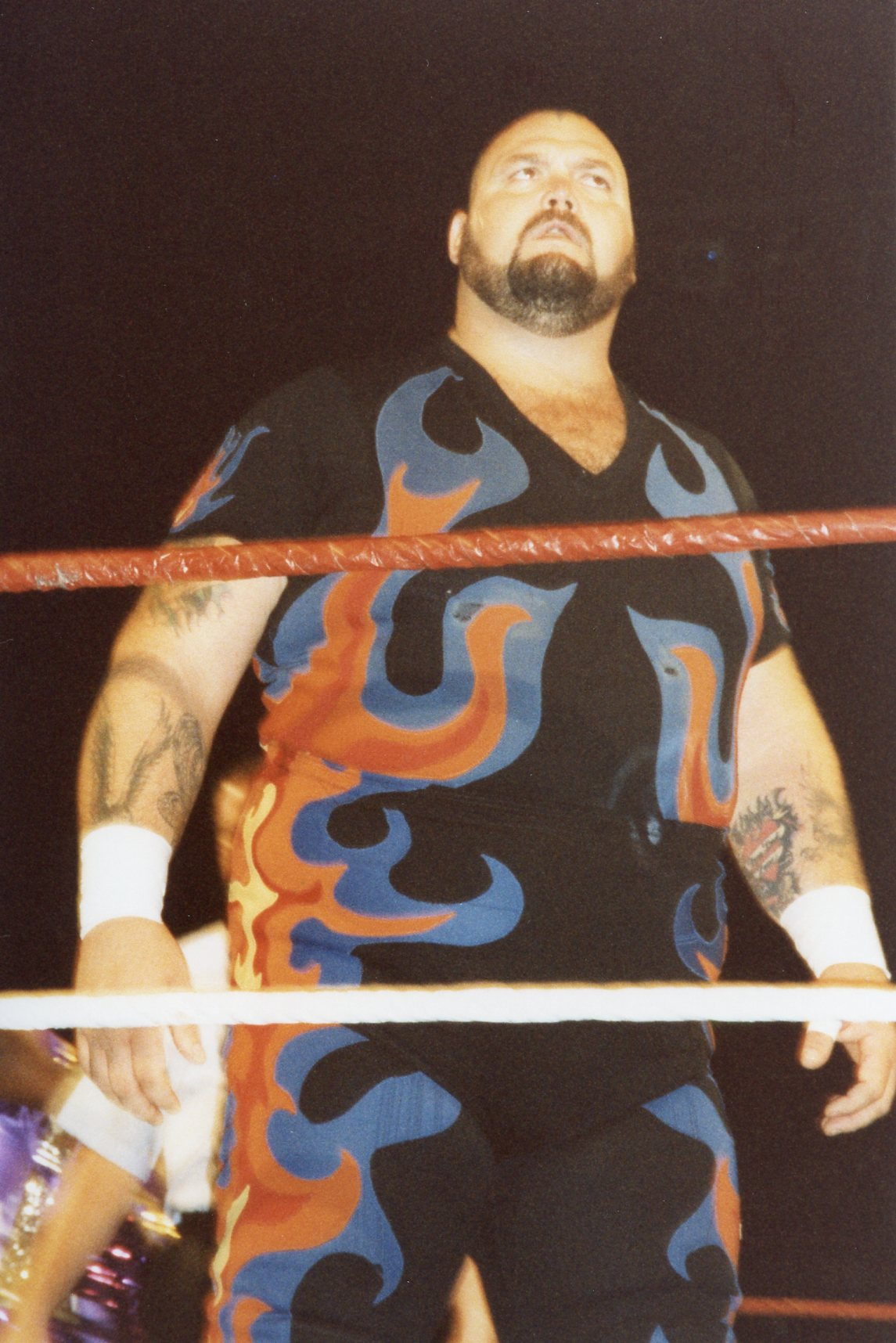
Bam Bam Bigelow

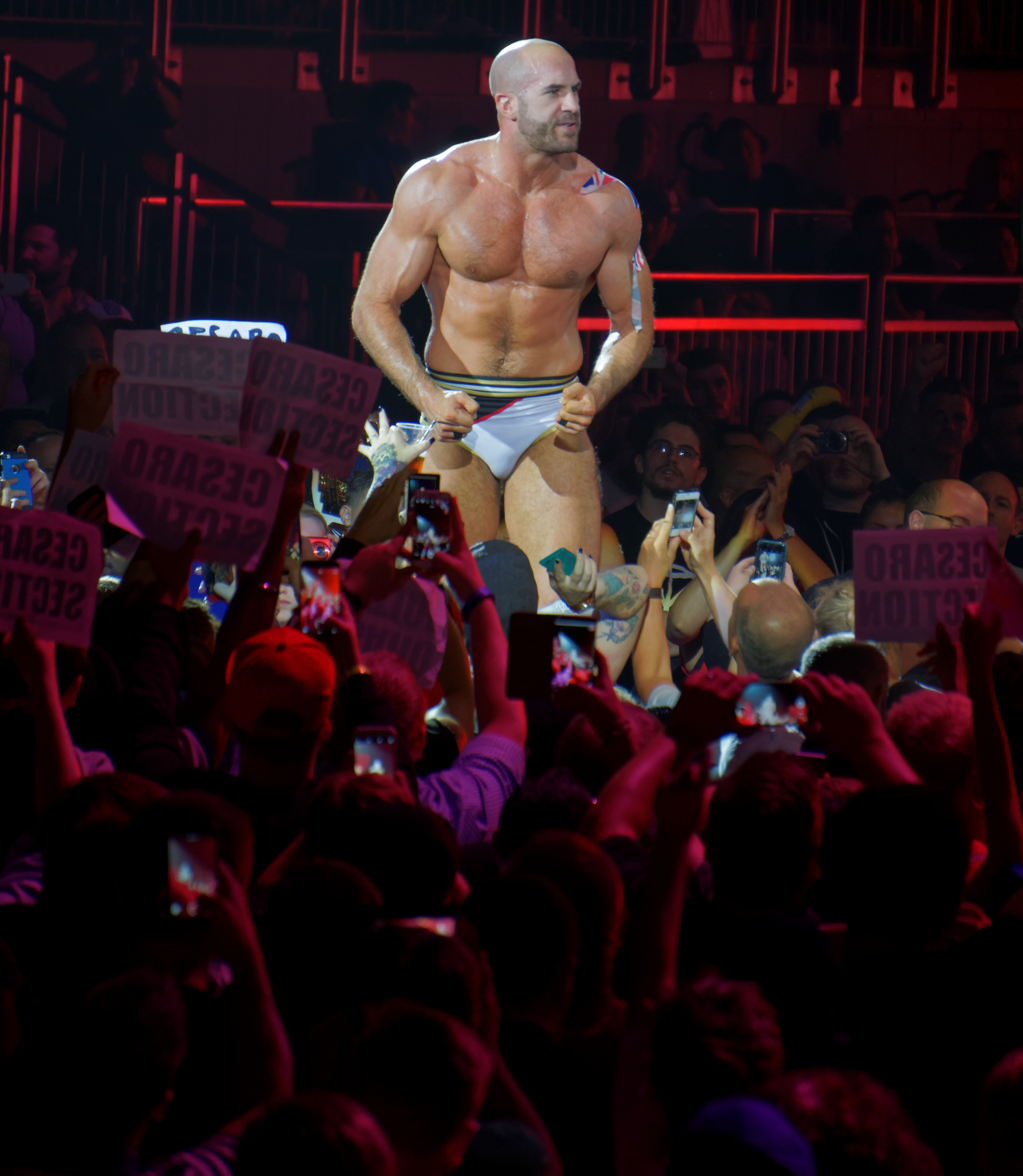
Cesaro

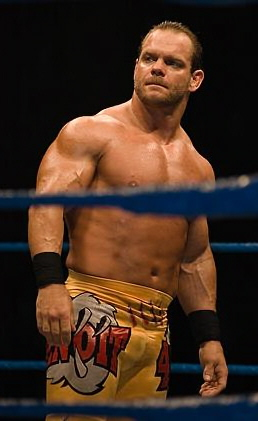
Chris Benoit

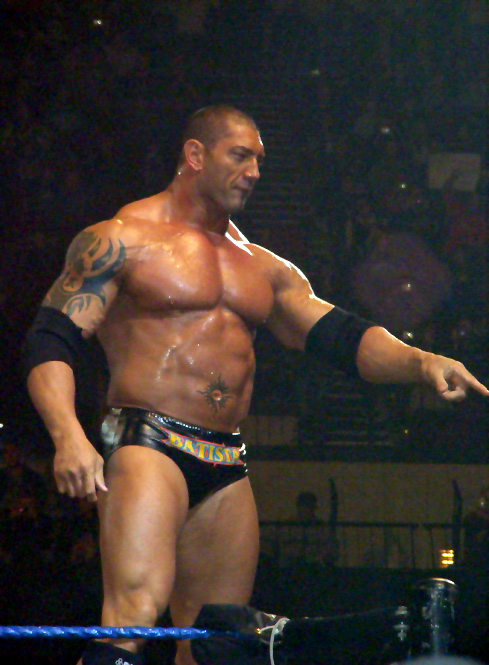
Batista

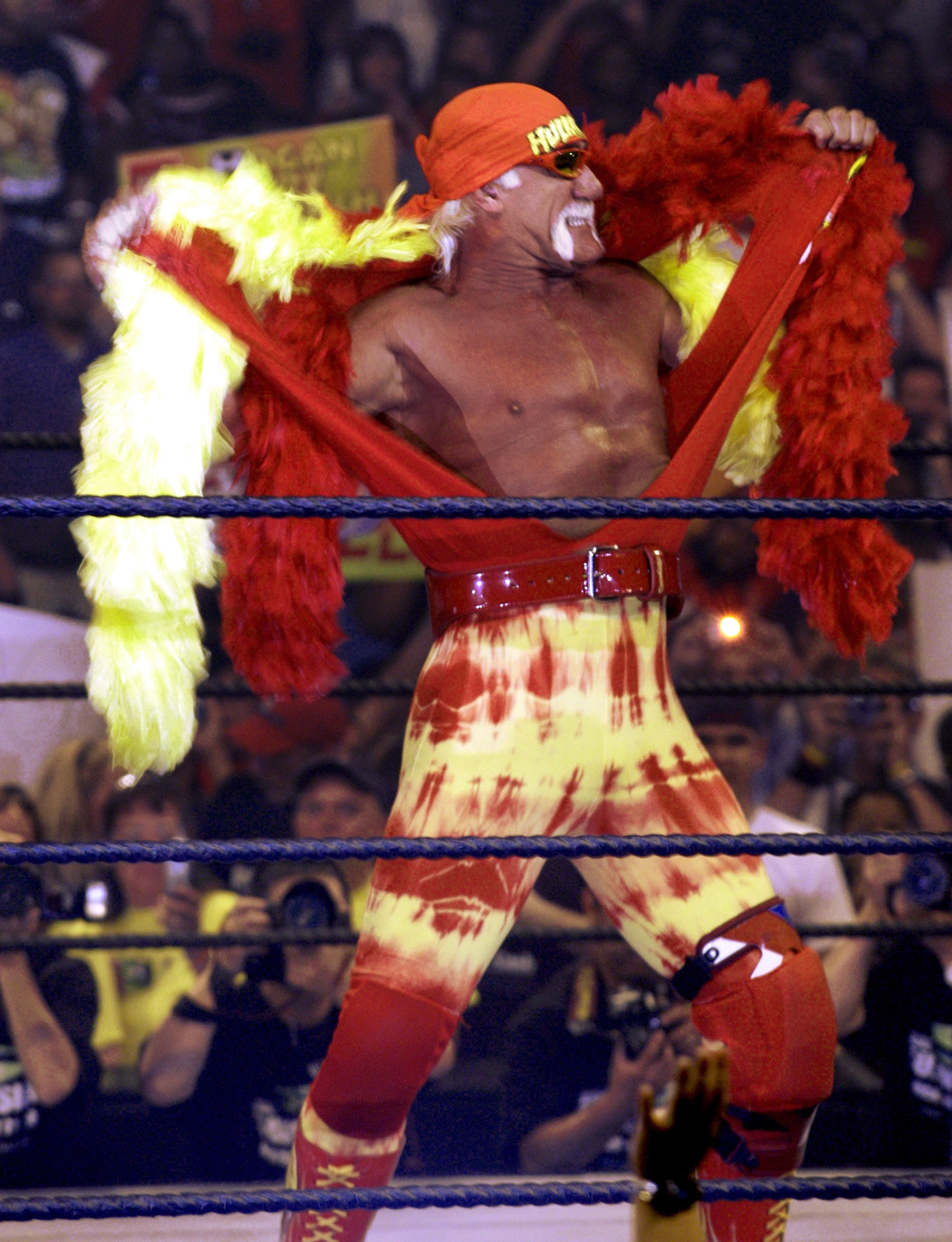
Hulk Hogan

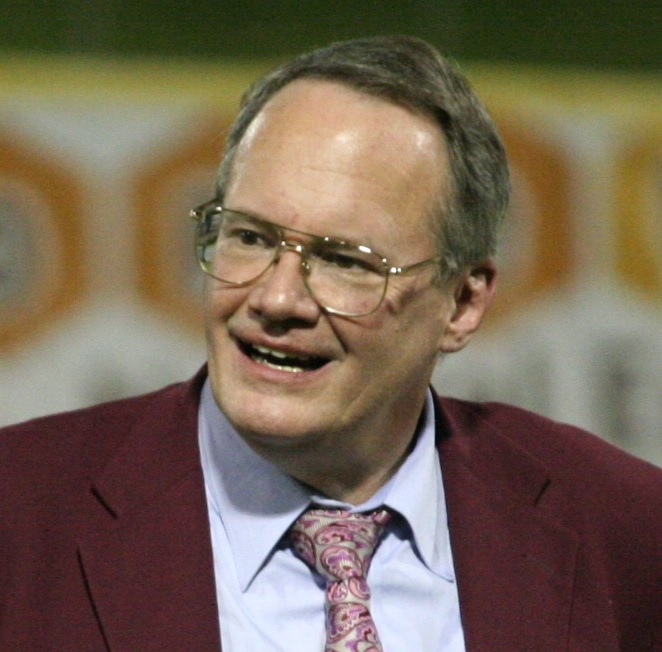
Jim Cornette

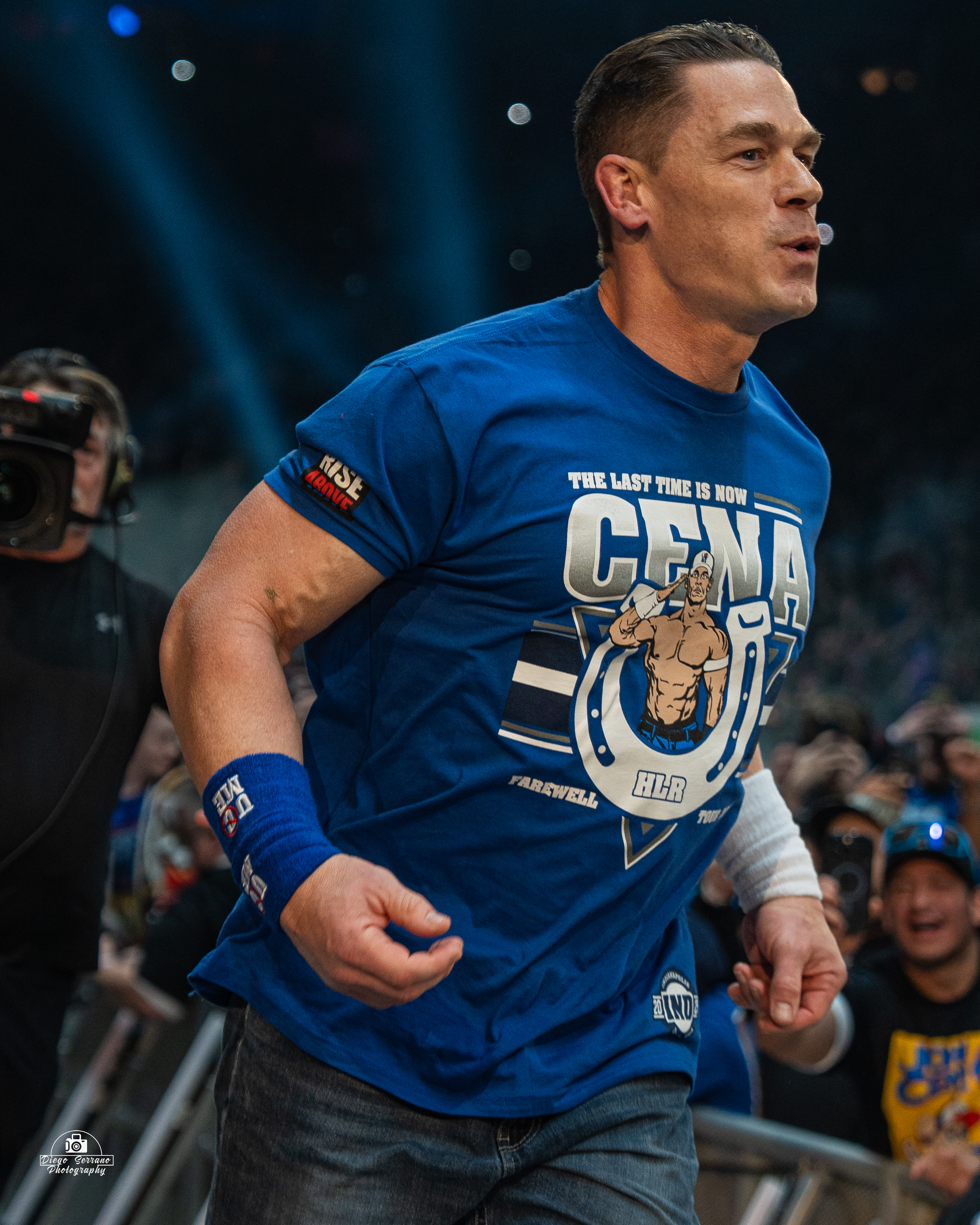
John Cena

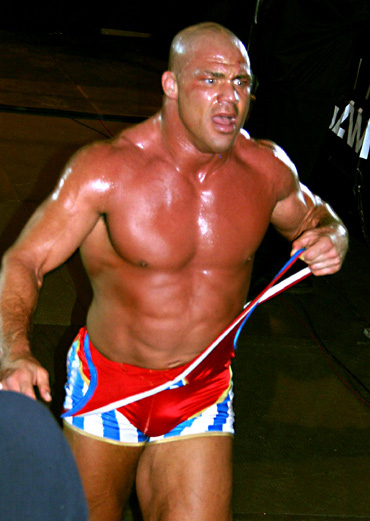
Kurt Angle

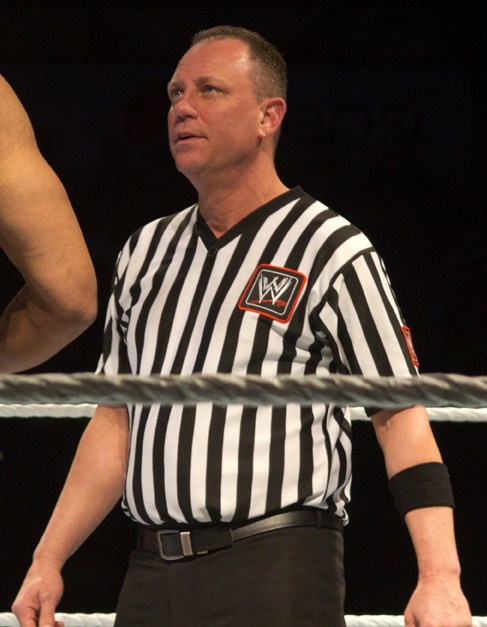
Mike Chioda

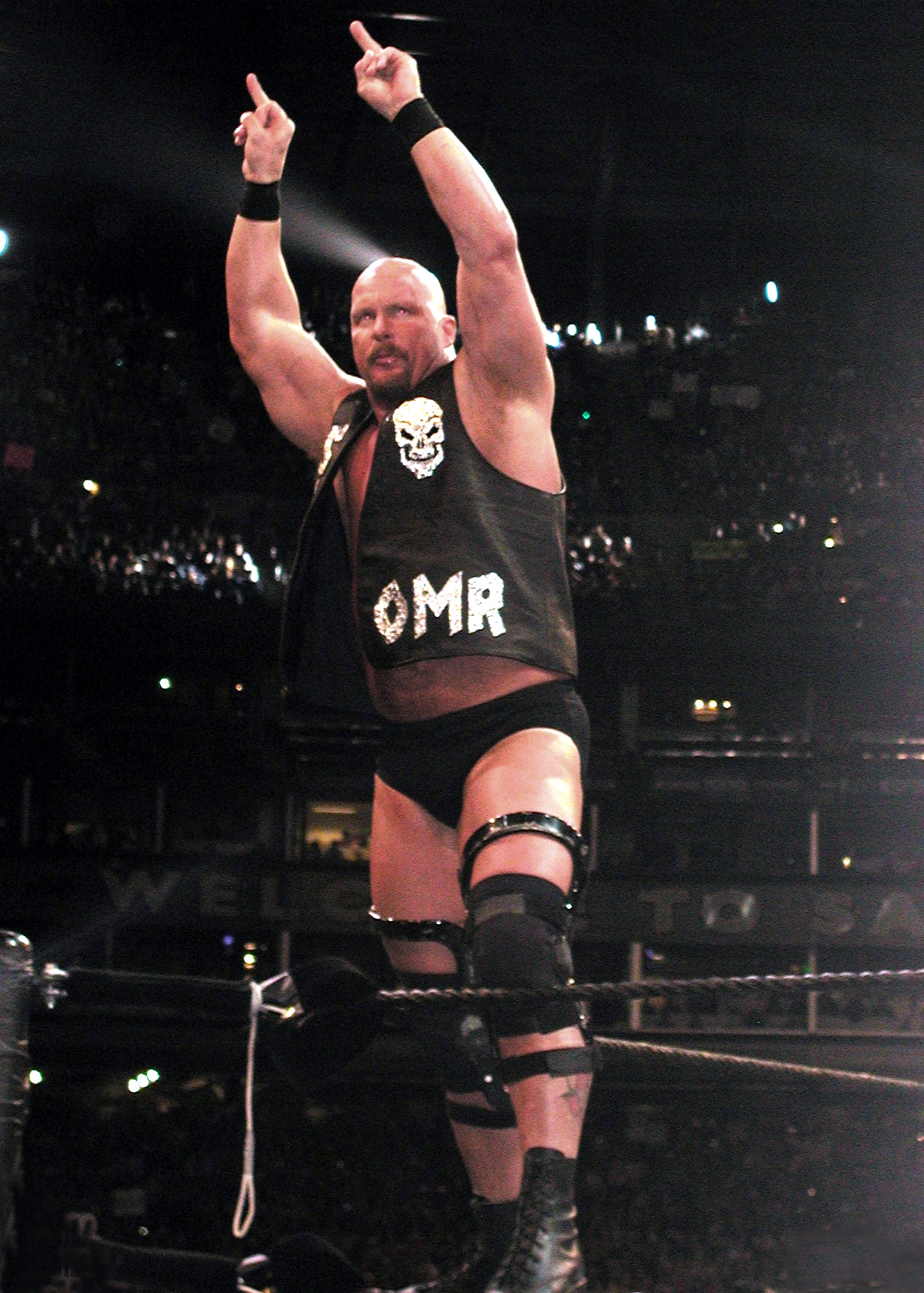
"Stone Cold" Steve Austin

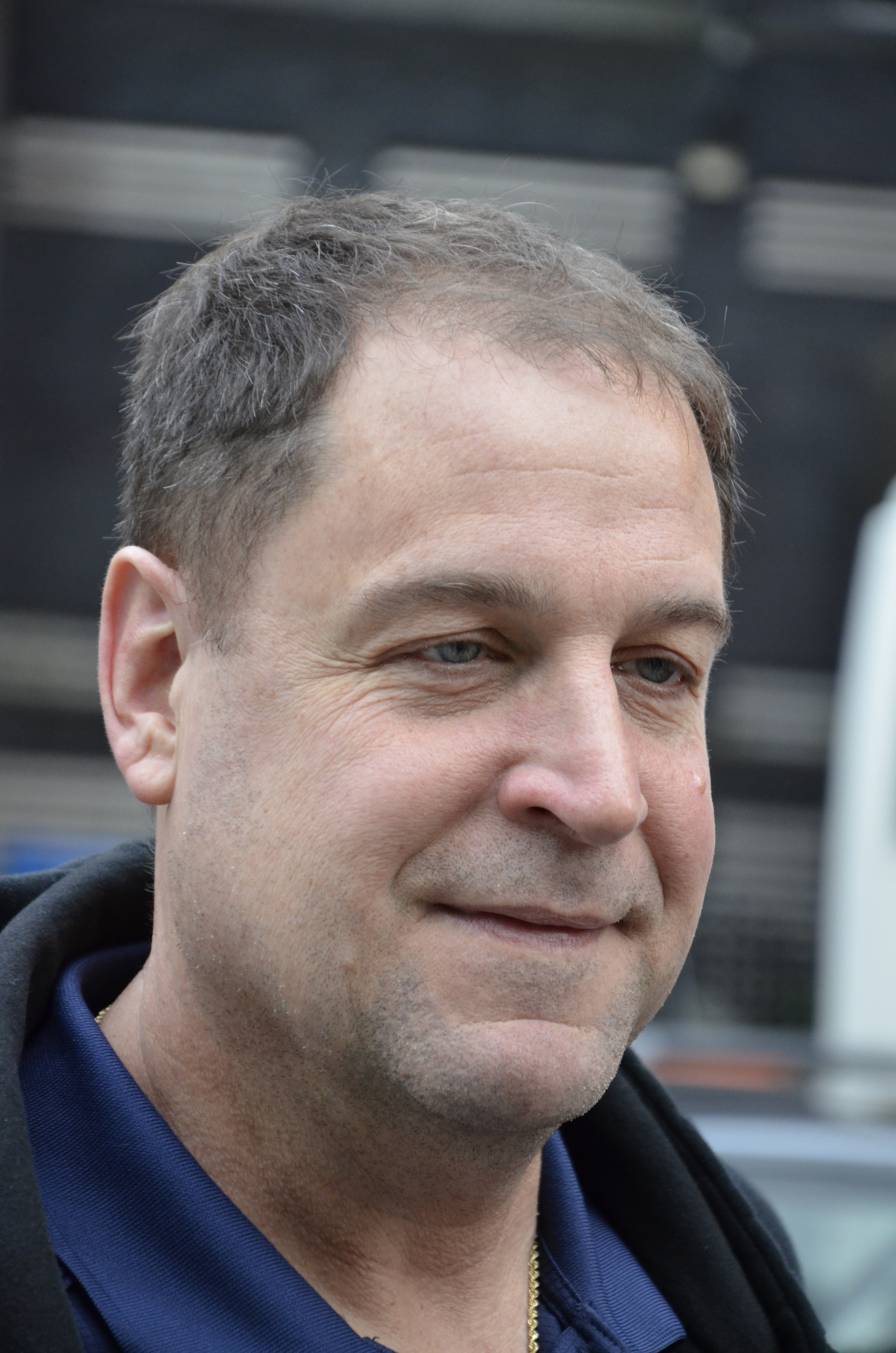
Tony Chimel

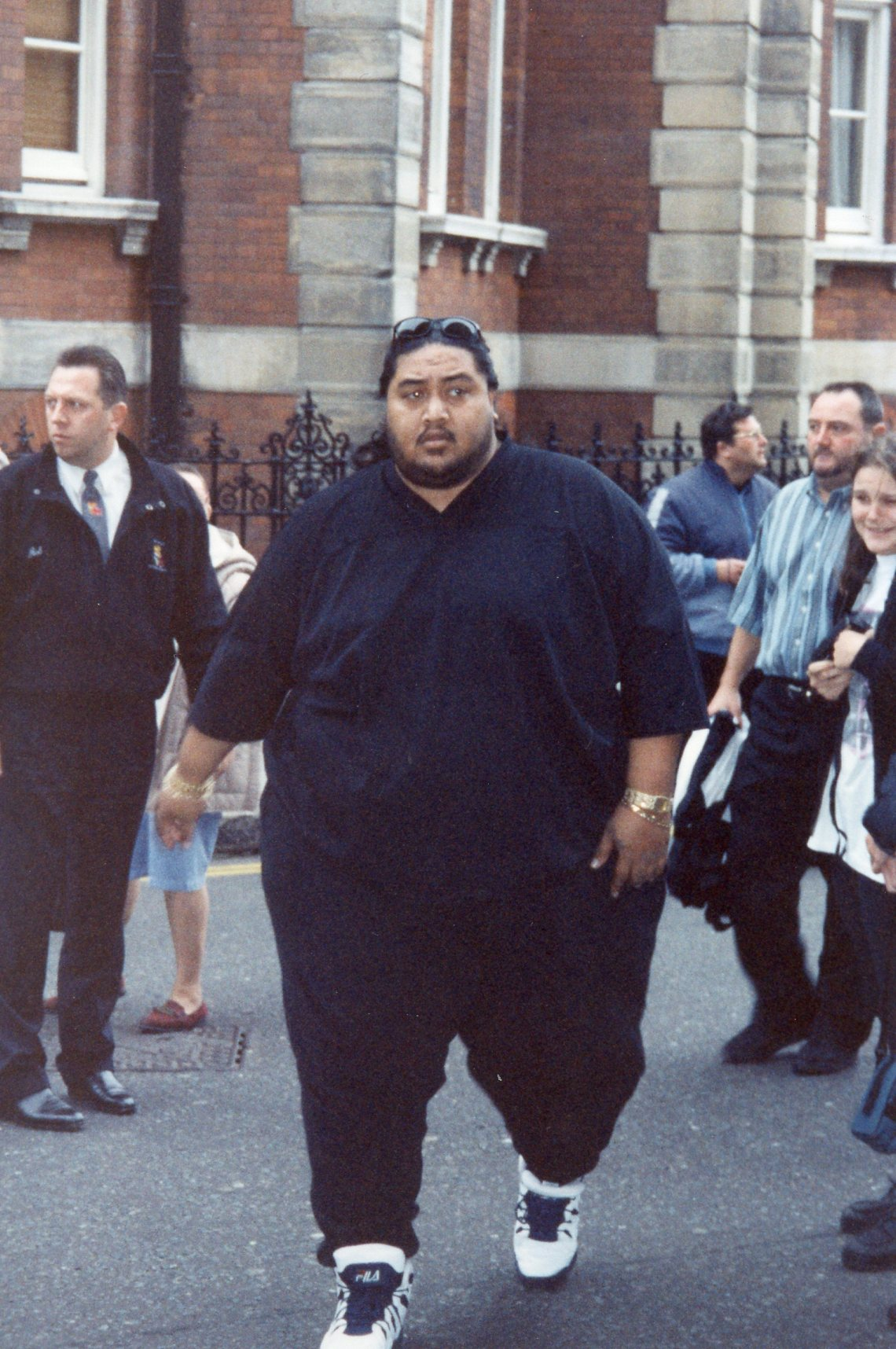
Yokozuna

Key
†	Indicates they are deceased
‡	Indicates they died while they were employed with WWE

Birth name	Ring name(s)	Tenure(s)	Ref
Anthony Greene	August Grey	2020–2021	
Unknown	Gran Metalik	2016–2021	
Louis Acocella	Gino Brito; Louis Cerdan	1964–1969; 1975–1976; 1982	
Michael Adamle	Mike Adamle	2008–2009	
Brian Adams ^{†}	Brian Adams; Crush; Demolition Crush; Kona Crush	1990–1991; 1992–1995; 1996–1997; 2001	
Brooke Adams	Brooke; Brooke Adams	2006–2007	
Matthew Adams	Buddy Murphy; Murphy	2013–2021	
Kerry Adkisson ^{†}	Kerry Von Erich; Texas Tornado	1990–1992	
Lacey Adkisson	Lacey Von Erich	2007	
Aaron Aguilera	Aaron Aguilera; Conquistador Uno; Jesús; Jesús Aguilera	2000; 2004–2005	
Fabian Aichner	Fabian Aichner; Giovanni Vinci	2017–2025	
Deveon Aikens	Wes Lee	2020–2025	
Ellen Åkesson	Ellen Åkesson	2025–2026	
Adeel Alam	Mustafa Ali; Ali	2016–2023	
Nhooph Al-Areebi	Aliyah	2015–2023	
Louis Albano ^{†}	"Captain" Lou Albano	1960–1961; 1964; 1967–1986; 1994–1995	
Achim Albrecht	Brakkus	1996–1998	
Brent Albright	Brent Albright; Gunner Scott	2004–2006	
Jorge Alcantar Bolly	El Hijo del Fantasma; Santos Escobar	2019–2025; 2025–2026	
Mary Alfonsi ^{†}	Donna Christanello	1965–1977; 1981–1987	
Michael Alfonso ^{†}	Mike Awesome	2001–2002	
Hazem Ali	Armando Alejandro Estrada; Armando Estrada	2005–2008; 2010–2012	
John Alicastro	John Alicastro	2012–2019	
Alicea, Marcelino Rivera |Marcelino Rivera Alicea]	Jose Luis Rivera; Conquistador #1; Conquistador Uno; Red Demon	1982–1991	
Chad Allegra	Karl Anderson	2016–2020; 2022–2025	
Samantha Allen	Nina Samuels	2018–2022	
Mansoor Al-Shehail	Mansoor mån.sôör Manny Faberino; Mansoor Al-Shehail	2018–2023	
Anthony Altomare ^{†}	Tony Altomare	1967–1980	
José Alvarado Nieves ^{†}	Super Porky	2005–2006	
Alexsis Amrhein	Dani Palmer	2022–2025	
Kenneth Anderson	Ken Kennedy; Mr. Kennedy	2005–2009	
Steven Anderson	The Ringmaster "Stone Cold" Steve Austin	1996–2002; 2003–2004	
Manuel Andrade Oropeza	Andrade; Andrade "Cien" Almas	2015–2021; 2024–2025	
Mark Andrews	Mark Andrews	2017–2022	
Eric Angle	Eric Angle	2000–2003	
Kurt Angle	Kurt Angle	1998–2006; 2017–2020	
Afa Anoa'i ^{†}	Afa	1979–1980; 1982–1984; 1992–1995	
Afa Anoa'i Jr.	Manu	2006–2009	
Agatupu Anoa'i ^{†}	Yokozuna	1992–1997	
Lloyd Anoa'i	Tahitian Savage; Tahitian Warrior / Fred Williams / Lloyd Lanui	1993; 1995–1996	
Matthew Anoa'i ^{†}	Rosey	1996; 2001–2006	
Samula Anoa'i	Sammy the Silk; Samu; Samula	1983–1984; 1992–1994; 1995–1996	
Leati Amituana'i Anoa'i ^{†}	Sika	1979–1980; 1982–1984; 1986–1988	
Darrell Anthony	TL Hopper; Uncle Cletus	1996–1997	
Jason Arhndt	Joey Abs	1994–1998; 1999–2001	
Eric Arndt	Enzo Amore	2012–2018	
Charly Arnolt	Charly Caruso	2016–2021	
Yoshihiro Asai	Último Dragón	2003–2004	
Robert Backlund	Bob Backlund	1976–1984; 1992–1997; 2000; 2012–2017	
Marcus Bagwell	Buff Bagwell	2001	
Douglas Baker ^{†}	The Ox; Arkansas Ox; Ox Baker	1967; 1980	
John Barend ^{†}	Johnny Barend	1962–1963	
Roger Barnes	"Rugged" Ronnie Garvin	1988–1990	
Ivor Barrett ^{†}	Pat Barrett	1963; 1975–1976	
George Barrios	George Barrios	2008–2020; 2023	
Chance Barrow	Andre Chase	2021–2026	
Robert Bartlett	Rob Bartlett	1993	
Lyle Basham Jr.	The Machine; Doug Basham	2002–2007	
Nicole Bass ^{†}	Nicole Bass	1999	
Rolland Bastien ^{†}	Red Bastien	1959–1961; 1964; 1970; 1976–1978	
Shayna Baszler	Shayna Baszler	2017–2025	
David Bautista Jr.	Leviathan; Deacon Batista; Batista	2000–2010; 2014; 2019	
Kayla Becker	Kayla Braxton	2016–2024	
Candice Beckman	Candice Michelle	2004–2009	
Robert Bédard ^{†}	Rene Goulet	1971–1987	
James Bednarski	Scott Putski	1997	
Józef Bednarski	Ivan Putski	1975–1987	
Rodney Begnaud	Redd Dogg; Rodney Mack	2002–2004; 2006–2007	
Shelton Benjamin	Shelton Benjamin	2000–2010; 2017–2023	
Michael Bennett	Mike Kanellis	2017–2020	
Christopher Benoit ^{‡}	Chris Benoit	1995; 2000–2007^{‡}	
Daria Berenato	Daria Berenato; Sonya Deville	2015–2025	
Ralph Berry ^{†}	"Wild" Red Berry	1958–1969	
Antoniono Biasetton ^{†}	Antonino Rocca	1953–1963; 1975–1977	
Scott Bigelow ^{†}	Bam Bam Bigelow	1987–1988; 1992–1995	
Thomas Billington ^{†}	Dynamite Kid	1982; 1985–1988	
Adam Birch	Joey Matthews; Joey Mercury	2004–2007; 2010–2016	
Paul Birchall	Paul Burchill; The Ripper	2005–2010	
Eric Bischoff	Eric Bischoff	2002–2007	
Steve Blackman	Steve Blackman	1997–2002	
Bonnie Blackstone	Boni Blackstone	1993	
Brian Blair	B. Brian Blair	1983–1988	
Tully Blanchard	Tully Blanchard	1988–1989; 2006	
Barbara Blank	Kelly Kelly	2006–2012	
Frederick Blassie ^{‡}	"Classy" Freddie Blassie	1964; 1971; 1973–2003	
Travis Bligh	Travis Banks	2017–2020	
Calvin Bloom	Von Wagner	2019–2024	
Wayne Bloom	Beau Beverly	1991–1993	
Rich Bocchini	Rich Brennan	2014–2016	
Nicholas Bockwinkel ^{†}	Nick Bockwinkel	1989	
Richard Bognar ^{†}	Fake Razor Ramon	1996–1997	
Terry Bollea ^{†}	Hollywood Hogan; Hulk Hogan; Mr. America	1979–1980; 1983–1993; 2002–2003; 2005–2006; 2014; 2015	
Celeste Bonin	Kaitlyn	2010–2014	
John Bonello	John Bonello	1984–1990	
Joseph Bonsignore	Joey Styles	2005–2016	
Brady Booker	Bodhi Hayward	2021–2022	
Larry Booker ^{†}	Moondog Spot	1981; 1984–1987	
Steve Borden	Sting	2014–2020	
Thomas Boric	Kato; Max Moon; Paul Diamond	1990–1993	
Wayde Bowles ^{†}	Rocky Johnson	1969; 1983–1984; 2003	
Jeffrey Bradley	Charlie Hunter	1993–1995	
Thomas Brandi	Salvatore Sincere; Tom Brandi	1996–1998	
Jean Brassard	Jean Brassard	1994–1999; 2017–2021	
Michael Brendli	Mike Mondo; Mikey	2005–2008	
Adolfo Bresciano ^{†}	Dino Bravo	1977–1978; 1986–1992	
Lucy Bridge	Stevie Turner	2021–2025	
Sarah Bridges	Sarah Logan; Valhalla	2016–2020; 2022–2025	
Freddie Brisco ^{†}	Jack Brisco	1984–1985	
Gerald Brisco	Gerald Brisco	1984–2020	
Marcus Brown	Marcus Brown	2026	
Montaque Brown	Marcus Cor Von; Marquis Cor Von	2006–2007	
Joseph Bruce	Violent J	1998	
Terrance Brunk ^{†}	Sabu	2006–2007	
James Brunzell	"Jumpin'" Jim Brunzell	1985–1988; 1991–1993	
Michael Bucci	Hollywood Nova; Simon Dean	2002–2007	
Barry Buchanan	B-2; B²; Bull Buchanan; Recon	1997–2003	
Rebecca Budig	Rebecca Budig	2000	
Tom Büdgen	Aleister Black	2017–2021; 2025–2026	
Eric Bugenhagen	Eric Bugenhagen; Joseph Average; The Nightpanther; Ric Boog; Rick Boogs; Rik Bugez	2017–2023	
Alvin Burke, Jr.	Antonio Banks; Montel Vontavious Porter	2005–2010; 2020–2024	
Elijah Burke	Elijah Burke	2004–2008	
Nicholas Busick ^{†}	Big Bully Busick; Nick Busick	1979; 1991	
Carlos Cabrera	Carlos Cabrera	1993–2022	
Robert Cain	Robert Gibson	1993; 1998	
Mark Calaway	Kane the Undertaker; The Undertaker	1990–2020	
William Calhoun ^{†}	Haystacks Calhoun	1958; 1964–1965; 1968–1969; 1973–1976; 1978; 1979	
Timothy Calkins Jr. ^{†}	The Zombie	2006	
Donald Callis	The Jackyl; The General	1997–1998	
Matthew Camp	Matt Camp	2019–2024	
Christopher Candido ^{†}	Skip	1995–1996; 1997	
Mark Canterbury	Henry O. Godwinn; Mark Canterbury	1994–1998; 2006–2007	
Matthew Cappotelli ^{†}	Matt Cappotelli	2002–2009	
William Cardille ^{†}	Bill Cardille	1963–1975	
Anthony Carelli	Santino Marella	2005–2016	
José Arriaga Rodríguez	Hunico; Sin Cara; Sin Cara Negro	2009–2019	
Stacy Carter	The Kat; Miss Kitty	1999–2001	
Scott Casey	Scott Casey	1987–1990	
David Cash	Kid Kash; David Jericho	1998; 2005–2006	
Jesús Ortiz Jr.	Jesus Castillo	1997–1999	
Claudio Castagnoli	Antonio Cesaro; Cesaro	2011–2022	
Kacy Catanzaro	Kacy Catanzaro; Katana Chance	2017–2025	
Maurice Catarcio ^{†}	The Matador	1957–1960	
John Cena	The Prototype; John Cena	2001–2025	
Paul Centopani	Paul Roma	1985–1991	
Manuel Chaji	The Amazing Zuma	1957–1960	
Rita Chatterton	Rita Marie	1984–1986	
Elizabeth Chihaia	Scarlett	2019–2021; 2022–2025	
Tony Chimel	Tony Chimel	1989–2020	
Michael Chioda	Mike Chioda	1989–2020	
Oliver Claffey	Gentleman Jack Gallagher; Jack Gallagher	2016–2020	
Bryan Clark	Adam Bomb; Bryan Clark	1993–1995; 2001	
Patrick Clark Jr.	Patrick Clark; Velveteen Dream	2015–2021	
Matthew Clement	Mike Dalton; Tyler Breeze	2010–2021	
Pierre Clermont ^{‡}	Pat Patterson	1979–2020	
Jonathan Coachman	Jonathan Coachman	1999–2008; 2018–2021	
Allen Coage ^{†}	Bad News Brown	1978–1979; 1988–1990	
Jeff Cobb	JC Mateo	2025–2026	
Brianna Coda	Cora Jade	2021–2025	
Joseph Coffey	Joe Coffey	2018–2025	
Mark Coffey	Mark Coffey	2018–2025	
Eldridge Coleman ^{‡}	"Superstar" Billy Graham	1975–1978; 1982–1983; 1986–1989; 2004–2009; 2015–2023	
Randy Colley ^{†}	Moondog Hawkins; Moondog Rex; Demolition Smash	1980–1987	
Carlos Colón Jr.	Carlito; Carlos Colón Jr. Carlito Caribbean Cool	2003–2010; 2023–2025	
Edwin Colón	Diego; Primo; Primo Colon	2007–2020	
Orlando Colón Nieves	Fernando; Epico; Epico Colon	2010–2020	
Scott Colton	Chris Guy; Colt Cabana; Scotty Goldman	2007–2009	
Accie Conner	D'Lo Brown; D-Lo Brown	1995–2003; 2008–2009	
Americo Constantino	Rico	1999–2004	
Robert Conway Jr.	Rob Conway; Robert Conway	1998–2007	
Ross Cooke	Saxon Huxley	2017–2022	
Levi Cooper	Tucker; Tucker Knight	2013–2021	
Marc Copani	Mark Magnus; Muhammad Hassan	2002–2005	
James Cornette	Jim Cornette	1993–2005	
Robert Cortes	Bobby Bold Eagle	1968	
Giacomo Costa ^{†}	Al Costello	1960–1961; 1963–1964; 1967; 1971–1972	
Daniel Covell	Conquistador Dos; Chris Daniels	1998–2000	
Victoria Crawford	Tori; Alicia Fox	2006–2023	
James Crookshanks	J. C. Ice	1995–1997	
Cheree Crowley	Dakota Kai; Evie	2016–2022; 2022–2025	
Ruben Cruz ^{†}	Ruben Ayala	1974–1975	
Donald Curtis ^{†}	Don Curtis	1958–1963	
Nicholas Cvjetkovich	Kizarny; Sinn Bowdee	2007–2009	
Kennedy Cummins	Carlee Bright	2022–2026	

== See also ==
- List of WWE personnel
