= Mike Pappas (wrestler) =

Greek professional wrestler (1941–2022)

Personal information
- Born: Emmanuel Savenas; 17 May 1941 Rhodes, Greece
- Died: December 31, 2022 (aged 81) Springfield, Missouri
- Website: www.mikepappas.net

Professional wrestling career
- Ring name: Mike Pappas
- Billed height: 5 ft 8 in (1.73 m)
- Billed weight: 224 lb (102 kg)
- Debut: 1968
- Retired: 1978

Emmanuel (Manoli) Savenas (May 17, 1941 – December 31, 2022), was a Greek American professional wrestler who wrestled under the name Mike Pappas. He worked mainly for World Wide Wrestling Federation in the early 1970s and the National Wrestling Alliance.

== Career ==
Pappas emigrated to the United States in 1967 and made his professional wrestling debut in 1968 in Australia. Later that year went to Mexico. In 1969 he worked for Nick Gulas's NWA Mid-America in Tennessee.

On September 9, 1970, Pappas won the WWA Light-Heavyweight Title with a win over Steve Clements at the Convention Hall in Gadsden, Alabama.

He made his debut for World Wide Wrestling Federation in 1971 as a fan favorite. He only scored victories over Jack Evans, Ben Ortiz, Akim Manuka, Bull Pometti, Juan Caruso, Joe Turco, Paul Figueroa, Mike McCord, and Jeff Rhodes He was well known in a photograph with the towering Andre the Giant, Chief Jay Strongbow and Victor Rivera in 1974. Pappas left the WWWF in 1974.

After the WWWF, Pappas worked in Florida, Oklahoma, Kansas City and St. Louis. He defeated a young Randy Savage three times and one draw.

He retired from wrestling in 1978.

== Personal life ==
After wrestling, Pappas became a jeweler and owned a jewelry store named Manoli's Jeweler's.

In 2018, Pappas won the USA Martial Arts Hall of Fame with the Wrestling Living Legend Award.

A documentary called "The Flying Greek" was released on July 17, 2022, about Pappas's life. It features Madusa Miceli.

== Death ==
Pappas died on December 31, 2022, at 81 from colorectal cancer.

In August 2023, a mural was done by Fight Colorectal Cancer in downtown Springfield, Missouri.

== Championships and accomplishments ==
  - WWA Light-Heavyweight Title (1 time)
