= Yamaguchi (surname) =

Yamaguchi (山口, "mountain entrance/gateway") is the 14th most common Japanese surname.

== Notable people with the surname ==
- Adam Yamaguchi, American television correspondent and producer
- Akane Yamaguchi (山口 茜; born 1997), Japanese badminton player
- Akihiro Yamaguchi (山口 観弘; born 1994), Japanese swimmer
- Akira Yamaguchi (山口 晃; born 1969), Japanese artist
- Atsushi Yamaguchi (judge), (born 1953), Japanese judge
- Bidou Yamaguchi (山口 毘堂; born 1970), Japanese Noh mask carver
- Eri Yamaguchi (disambiguation), multiple people
- Eriko Yamaguchi (山口 恵梨子; born 1991), Japanese shogi player
- Erina Yamaguchi (山口 絵里奈; born 1985), Japanese gravure idol
- Gōgen Yamaguchi (山口 剛玄; 1909–1989), Japanese karateka
- Gorō Yamaguchi (山口 五郎; 1933–1999), Japanese shakuhachi musician
- Harukichi Yamaguchi (山口 春吉; 1881–1938), Japanese mob boss
- Hatsuye Yamaguchi (1911–2005), Japanese-American artist and dollmaker
- Hideko Yamaguchi, plaintiff foster mother in Sweden v. Yamaguchi, a famous international family law trial
- Yamaguchi Hisashi (山口 久; 1952–2010), Japanese sumo wrestler
- Hitomi Yamaguchi (山口 瞳; 1923–1995), Japanese novelist and essayist
- Hōshun Yamaguchi (山口 蓬春; 1893–1971), Japanese painter
- Hotaru Yamaguchi (山口 蛍; born 1990), Japanese footballer
- Ichiro Yamaguchi (山口 一郎; born 1980), Japanese musician
- Izumi Yamaguchi (山口 いづみ; born 1954), Japanese actress
- Jun Yamaguchi (山口 淳; born 1967), Japanese composer
- Junya Yamaguchi, Japanese musician
- Kaori Yamaguchi (山口 香; born 1964), Japanese judoka
- Kappei Yamaguchi (山口 勝平; born 1965), Japanese actor and voice actor
- Kayo Yamaguchi (山口 華楊; 1899–1984), Japanese painter
- Kazuhiko Yamaguchi (山口 和彦; 1937-2026), Japanese film director
- Kazuki Yamaguchi (disambiguation), multiple people
- Kazuma Yamaguchi (山口 一真; born 1996), Japanese footballer
- Kazuo Yamaguchi (山口 一男; born 1946), Japanese sociologist
- Kei Yamaguchi (山口 慶; born 1983), Japanese footballer
- Keiji Yamaguchi (山口 圭司; born 1974), Japanese boxer
- Ken Yamaguchi (山口 健; 1956–2011), Japanese voice actor
- Koichi Yamaguchi (山口 弘一), Japanese bicycle framebuilder
- Kosei Yamaguchi (山口 浩勢; born 1991), Japanese long-distance runner
- Kristi Yamaguchi (born 1971), American figure skater
- Mai Yamaguchi (山口 舞; born 1983), Japanese volleyball player
- Makoto Yamaguchi (山口 真; born 1944), Japanese origami artist
- Mami Yamaguchi (山口 麻美; born 1986), Japanese women's footballer
- Mamoru Yamaguchi (山口 マモル; born 1977), Japanese mixed martial artist
- Manabu Yamaguchi (山口学; born 1984), Japanese drummer and record producer known as Mabanua
- Marie Yamaguchi (山口 真理恵; born 1989), Japanese rugby sevens player
- Masa Yamaguchi (born 1974), Australian actor
- Masakatsu Yamaguchi, plaintiff foster father in Sweden v. Yamaguchi, a famous international family law trial
- Masakazu Yamaguchi (山口 譲司), Japanese manga artist
- Masao Yamaguchi (山口 昌男; 1931–2013), Japanese anthropologist
- Masaya Yamaguchi (born 1970), American jazz guitarist and music writer
- Masayoshi Yamaguchi (山口 正義; born 1947), Japanese scientist
- Masuka Yamaguchi (山口 尚芳; 1839-1894), Japanese government official
- Mayumi Yamaguchi (山口 眞弓; born 1975), Japanese voice actress
- Megumi Yamaguchi (山口 愛; born 1997), Japanese voice actress
- Mei Yamaguchi (山口 芽生; born 1983), Japanese mixed martial artist and kickboxer
- Michael Yamaguchi, American lawyer
- Misaki Yamaguchi (山口 美咲; born 1990), Japanese swimmer
- Miyako Yamaguchi (山口 美也子; born 1952), Japanese actress
- Moe Yamaguchi (山口 もえ; born 1977), Japanese television personality
- Momoe Yamaguchi (山口 百恵; born 1959), Japanese singer, actress and idol
- Motohiro Yamaguchi (山口 素弘; born 1969), Japanese footballer and manager
- Nana Yamaguchi (山口 奈々; born 1938), Japanese voice actress
- Naohide Yamaguchi (山口 尚秀; born 2000), Japanese Paralympic swimmer
- Noboru Yamaguchi (disambiguation), multiple people
- Natsuo Yamaguchi (山口 那津男; born 1952), Japanese politician
- Otoya Yamaguchi (山口 二矢; 1943–1960), Japanese ultranationalist best known for his assassination of Inejiro Asanuma
- Renshi Yamaguchi (山口 廉史; born 1992), Japanese footballer
- Rie Yamaguchi (山口 理恵; born 1986), Japanese voice actress
- Rikako Yamaguchi (山口 立花子; born 1988), Japanese voice actress
- Roy Yamaguchi, Japanese-American chef
- Ryōta Yamaguchi (山口 亮太; born 1969), Japanese anime screenwriter
- Satoshi Yamaguchi (disambiguation), multiple people
- Satyu Yamaguti (山口 左仲; 1894-1976), Japanese parasitologist
- Sayaka Yamaguchi (山口 紗弥加; born 1980), Japanese actress
- Sayoko Yamaguchi (山口 小夜子; 1949–2007), Japanese model and actress
- Sayuri Yamaguchi (山口 小百合; born 1966), Japanese women's footballer
- Seigo Yamaguchi (山口 清吾; 1924–1996), Japanese aikidoka
- Seiya Yamaguchi (山口 聖矢; born 1993), Japanese footballer
- Yamaguchi Sekkei (山口 雪渓; 1644/48 – 1732), Japanese artist
- Senji Yamaguchi (山口 仙二; 1930–2013), Japanese anti–nuclear weapons activist
- Shogo Yamaguchi (山口 翔悟; born 1983), Japanese actor
- Shun Yamaguchi (山口 俊; born 1987), Japanese baseball player
- Shunichi Yamaguchi (山口 俊一; born 1950), Japanese politician
- Yamaguchi Soken (山口 素絢; 1759–1818), Japanese painter
- Susumu Yamaguchi (山口 益; 1895–1976), Japanese Buddhist scholar
- Yamaguchi Tadasada (山口 正定; 1843–1902), Imperial Japanese Navy officer
- Taimei Yamaguchi (山口 泰明; born 1948), Japanese politician
- Takahiro Yamaguchi (山口 貴弘; born 1984), Japanese footballer
- Takashi Yamaguchi (architect) (山口 隆; born 1953), Japanese architect
- Takashi Yamaguchi (actor, born 1936) (山口 崇; 1936–2025), Japanese actor
- Takayuki Yamaguchi (disambiguation), multiple people
- Takeo Yamaguchi (山口 長男; 1902–1983), Japanese painter
- Takeshi Yamaguchi (山口 武士; born 1979), Japanese footballer
- Tamon Yamaguchi (山口 多聞; 1892–1942), Imperial Japanese Navy admiral
- Taro Yamaguchi (山口 太郎; born 1970), Japanese voice actor
- Tatsuya Yamaguchi (disambiguation), multiple people
- Tazuo Yamaguchi, American poet and filmmaker
- Tetsuharu Yamaguchi (山口 哲治; born 1970), Japanese footballer
- Tetsumasa Yamaguchi (山口 徹正; born 1947), Japanese sprint canoeist
- Tetsuya Yamaguchi (山口 鉄也; born 1983), Japanese baseball player
- Toichi Yamaguchi (山口 東一; born 1941), Japanese middle-distance runner
- Tomoko Yamaguchi (山口 智子; born 1964), Japanese actress and voice actress
- Tomomi Yamaguchi, Japanese anthropologist
- Tomomitsu Yamaguchi (山口 智充; born 1969), Japanese comedian, actor and voice actor
- Toshihiro Yamaguchi (山口 敏弘; born 1971), Japanese footballer
- Toshio Yamaguchi (山口 敏夫; born 1940), Japanese politician
- Tsubasa Yamaguchi (山口つばさ), Japanese manga artist
- Tsutomu Yamaguchi (山口 彊; 1916–2010), Japanese national who survived both the Hiroshima and Nagasaki atomic bombings during the Second World War
- Tsuyoshi Yamaguchi (disambiguation), multiple people
- Wally Yamaguchi (1959–1958), also known as Yamaguchi-san, Japanese professional wrestling manager and sports journalist
- Yasushi Yamaguchi (山口 恭史), Japanese video game artist and designer
- Yoko Yamaguchi (山口 洋子; 1937–2014), Japanese lyricist and writer
- Yorifusa Yamaguchi (山口 頼房; 1959-2020), Japanese film director
- Yoshiharu Yamaguchi (山口 良治; 1943–2026), Japanese rugby union player
- Yoshiko Yamaguchi (山口 淑子; 1920–2014), Chinese-born Japanese actress and singer
- Yoshinori Yamaguchi (山口 祥義; born 1965), Japanese politician
- Yoshitada Yamaguchi (山口 芳忠; born 1944), Japanese footballer and manager
- Yūdai Yamaguchi (山口 雄大; born 1971), Japanese film director
- Yuki Yamaguchi (山口 有希; born 1984), Japanese sprinter
- Yuko Yamaguchi (山口 裕子; born 1955), Japanese character designer and illustrator
- Yūji Yamaguchi (山口 祐司; fl. 1999–2014), Japanese animator
- Yuriko Yamaguchi (voice actress) (山口 由里子; born 1965), Japanese voice actress
- Yuriko Yamaguchi (sculptor) (born 1948), Japanese-American sculptor
- Yutaka Yamaguchi (山口 泰; born 1940), Japanese businessman and economist
- Zuiho Yamaguchi (山口 瑞鳳; 1926–2023), Japanese Buddhist scholar and Tibetologist

== Fictional characters ==
- Yamaguchi-sensei (山口先生), a character in the manga series Hajime no Ippo
- Kisaragi Yamaguchi (山口 如月), a character in the manga series GA Geijutsuka Art Design Class
- Kumiko "Yankumi" Yamaguchi (山口 久美子), a character in the manga series Gokusen
- Tadashi Yamaguchi (山口 忠), a character in the manga series Haikyu!!
