= Yutaka =

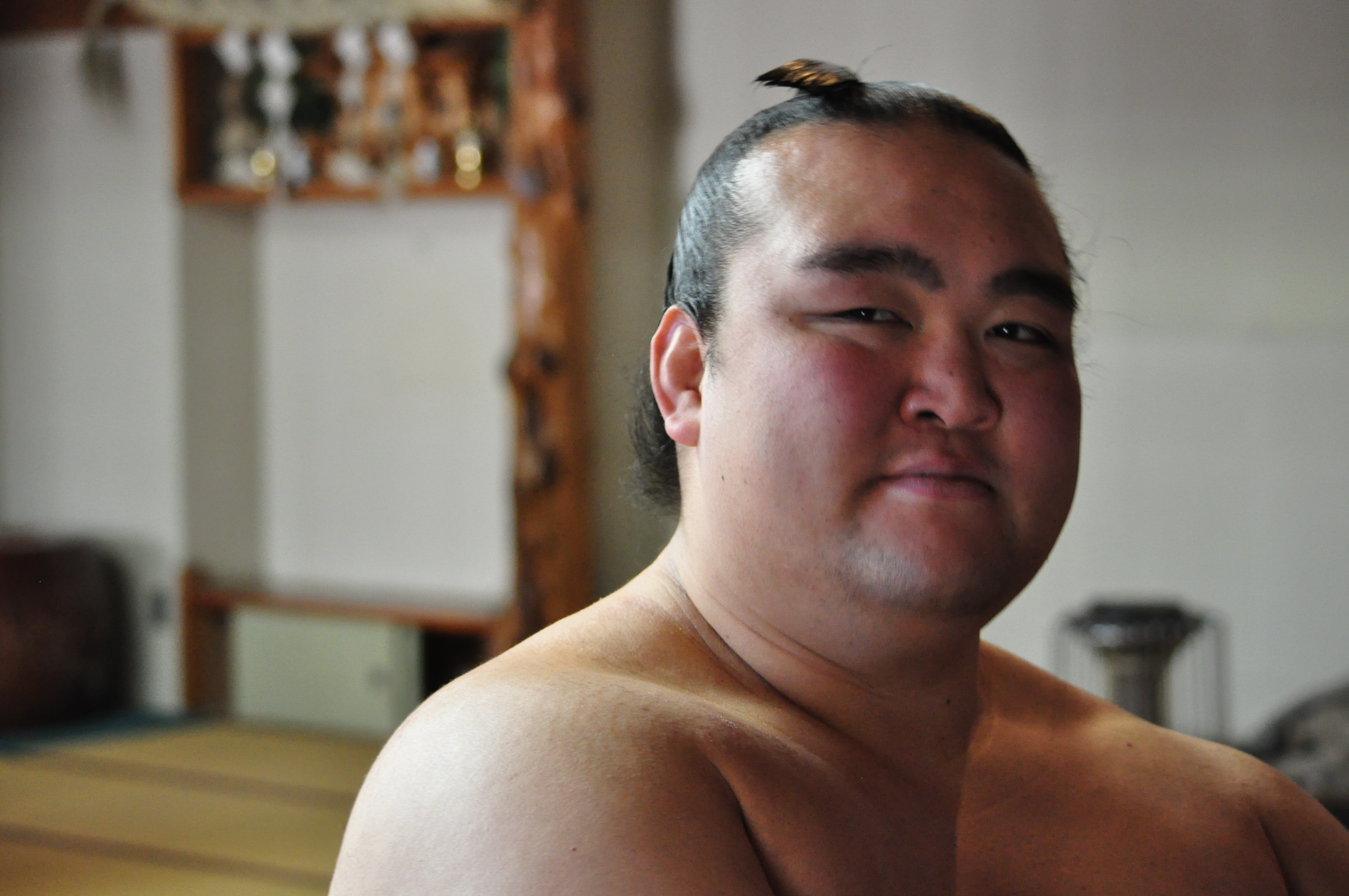
- Yutaka Kisenosato, Japanese sumo wrestler
- Pronunciation: jɯtaka (IPA)
- Gender: Male

Origin
- Origin: Japanese
- Meaning: It can have many different meanings depending on the kanji used.

Yutaka is a masculine Japanese given name.

== Written forms ==
Yutaka can be written using different kanji characters and can mean:

- 豊, "bountiful"
- 裕, "affluence"
- 穣, "fertile"
- 温, "warmth"

The name can also be written in hiragana ゆたか or katakana ユタカ.

== Notable people with the name ==
- Yutaka Abe (阿部 豊), Japanese film director and actor
- Yutaka Aihara (相原 豊; born 1970), Japanese gymnast
- Yutaka Akita (秋田 豊, born 1970), Japanese football player
- Yutaka Aoyama (青山 穣, born 1965), Japanese voice actor
- Yutaka Banno (伴野 豊, born 1961), Japanese politician of the Democratic Party of Japan
- Yutaka Demachi (出町 豊, born 1935), Japanese volleyball player
- Yutaka Ebina (蛯名 豊; born 1943), Japanese ice hockey player
- Yutaka Enatsu (江夏 豊, born 1948), Japanese baseball pitcher
- Rickie Fowler (リッキー・ユタカ・ファウラー, born 1988), Japanese-American Professional Golf Champion, named after maternal grandfather
- Yutaka Fujimoto (藤本 裕; 1950–2001), Japanese basketball player
- Yutaka Fukufuji (福藤 豊, born 1982), the first Japanese-born player to appear in a National Hockey League game
- Yutaka Fukumoto (福本 豊, born 1947), professional baseball player
- Yutaka Fukushima (福島 豊, born 1958), Japanese politician of the New Komeito Party
- Yutaka Gibbons (1944–2021), Palauan activist and politician
- Yutaka Haniya (埴谷 雄高, 1909–1997), Japanese author
- Yutaka Higuchi (樋口 豊, born 1949), Japanese figure skater
- Yutaka Higuchi (桶口 豊, born 1967), bassist for the Japanese rock band BUCK-TICK
- Yutaka Hirose (広瀬 裕, born 1962), Japanese actor and voice actor
- Yutaka Ikeuchi (池内 豊; born 1961), Japanese footballer
- Yutaka Ishinabe (石鍋 裕, born 1948), the first French Chef in the Japanese cooking show Iron Chef
- Yutaka Izubuchi (出渕 裕, born 1958), Japanese illustrator, anime designer and director
- Yutaka Kagaya (加賀谷 穣, born 1968), Japanese digital artist
- Yutaka Kanai (金井 豊, 1959–1990), Japanese long-distance runner
- Yutaka Katayama (片山 豊, born 1909), the first president of Nissan Motor Company in U.S.A
- Yutaka Kawaguchi (川口 寛; born 1973), Japanese ice hockey player
- Yutaka Kisenosato (稀勢の里 寛, born 1986), sumo wrestler (born Yutaka Hagiwara 萩原 寛)
- Yutaka Mafune (真船 豊, 1902–1977), playwright in Showa period Japan
- Yutaka Matsushige (松重 豊, born 1963), Japanese actor
- Yutaka Minowa (箕輪 豊, born 1965), character designer and animation director who works with Madhouse
- Yutaka Mizutani (水谷 豊, born 1952), Japanese actor and singer
- Yutaka Nakamura (中村 豊; born 1967), Japanese animator
- Yutaka Niida (新井田 豊, born 1978), professional minimumweight boxer
- Yutaka Ohno (大野 豊, born 1955), Japanese baseball player
- Yutaka Ozaki (尾崎 豊, 1965–1992), popular Japanese musician
- Yutaka Sado (佐渡 裕, born 1961), Japanese conductor
- Yutaka Tahara (田原 豊, born 1982), Japanese football player
- Yutaka Takanashi (高梨 豊, born 1935), Japanese photographer who photographed fashion, urban design, and city life
- Yutaka Take (武 豊, born 1969), Japanese jockey
- Yutaka Takenouchi (竹野内 豊, born 1971), Japanese actor
- Yutaka Taniyama (谷山 豊, 1927–1958), Japanese mathematician
- Yutaka Wada (和田 豊, born 1962), Japanese baseball player
- Yutaka Yaguchi (矢口 豊, born 1932), Chief Instructor and Chairman of the International Shotokan Karate Federation
- Yutaka Yamada (山田 豊; born 1989), Japanese composer
- Yutaka Yamaguchi (山口 泰, born 1940), member of the Group of Thirty
- Yutaka Yamamoto (山本 寛, born 1974), Japanese animation director
- Yutaka Yokokura (横倉 裕, born 1956), Japanese jazz musician
- Yutaka Yoshida (吉田 豊; born 1990), Japanese footballer
- Yutaka Yoshie (吉江 豊, born 1974), Japanese professional wrestler

== Fictional characters ==
- Yutaka Kobayakawa (小早川 ゆたか), character in the anime series Lucky Star
- Yutaka Kobayashi (小林 温)), Megatokyo character
- Yutaka Seto (瀬戸 豊), character in the novel, film and manga Battle Royale
- Yutaka Tamaru (多丸 裕), minor character in the Suzumiya Haruhi franchise
- Yutaka Kazami (風見 豊), character in the Gyakuten Saiban series
- Yutaka Kono (河野 豊), character in the Darker than Black series
- Yutaka Shinozaki (篠崎 豊), character in the My Tiny Senpai series

== See also ==
- Yutaka, Hiroshima, town located in Toyota District of Hiroshima, Japan
- Fukuhoku Yutaka Line, four sections of railway line in Fukuoka Prefecture, Kyūshū, Japan
- Yutaka (video game company), the name of a former Japanese video game company
