= List of former WWE personnel (S–Z) =

WWE is an entertainment company based in Stamford, Connecticut that is primarily involved in the business of professional wrestling Former employees (family name letters S–Z) in WWE consist of professional wrestlers, managers, play-by-play and color commentators, announcers, interviewers, referees, trainers, script writers, executives, and board of directors.

WWE talents' contracts range from developmental contracts to multi-year deals. They primarily appeared on WWE television programming, pay-per-views, and live events, and talent with developmental contracts appeared at NXT (formerly Florida Championship Wrestling), or they appeared at WWE's former training facilities: Deep South Wrestling, Heartland Wrestling Association, International Wrestling Association, Memphis Championship Wrestling, or Ohio Valley Wrestling. When talent is released of their contract, it could be for a budget cut, the individual asking for their release, for personal reasons, time off from an injury, or retirement. In some cases, talent has died while they were contracted, such as Brian Pillman, Owen Hart, Eddie Guerrero, Chris Benoit, and Bray Wyatt.

Those who made appearances without a contract and those who were previously released but are currently employed by WWE are not included.

== Alumni (S–Z) ==
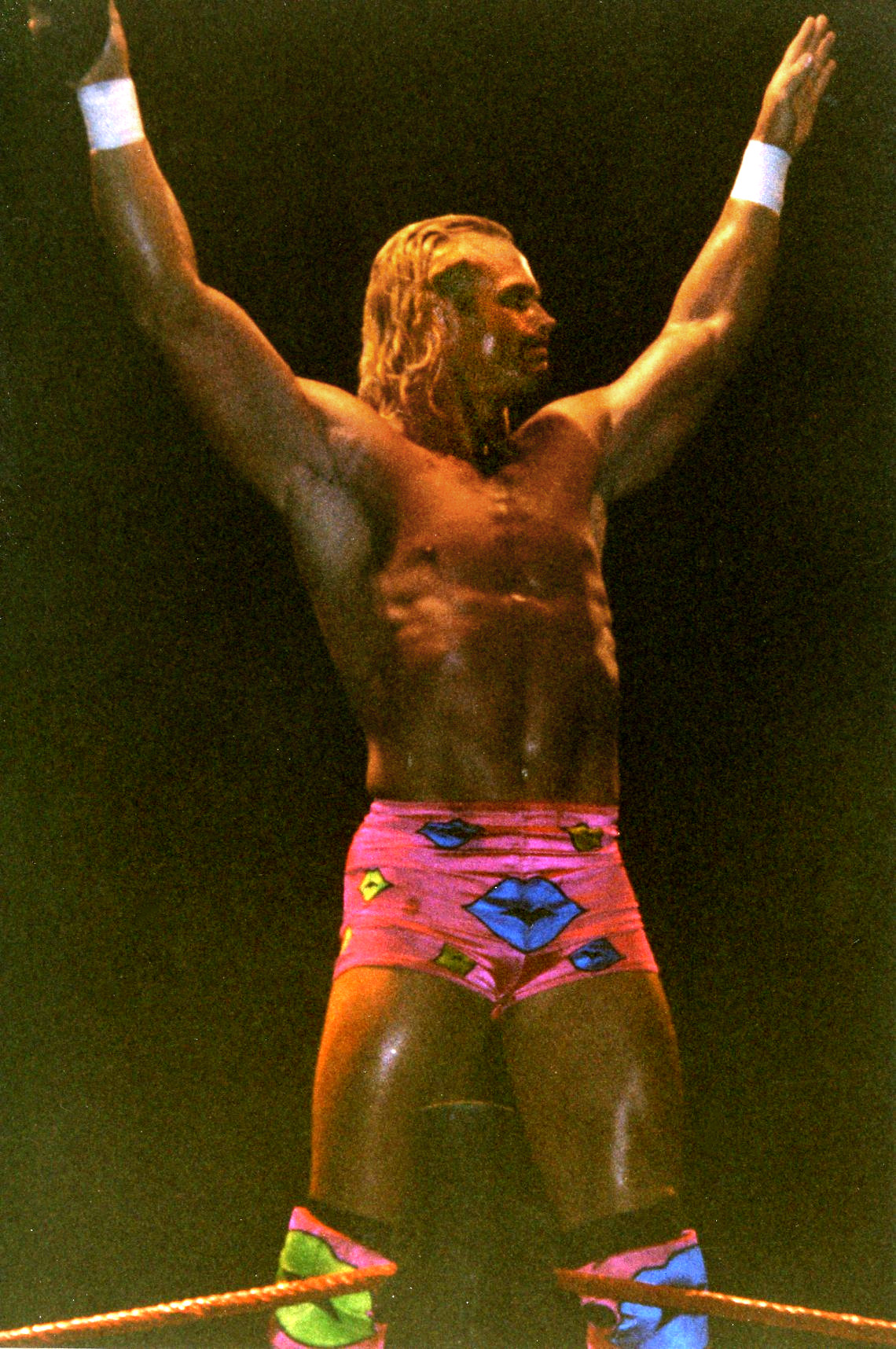
Billy Gunn

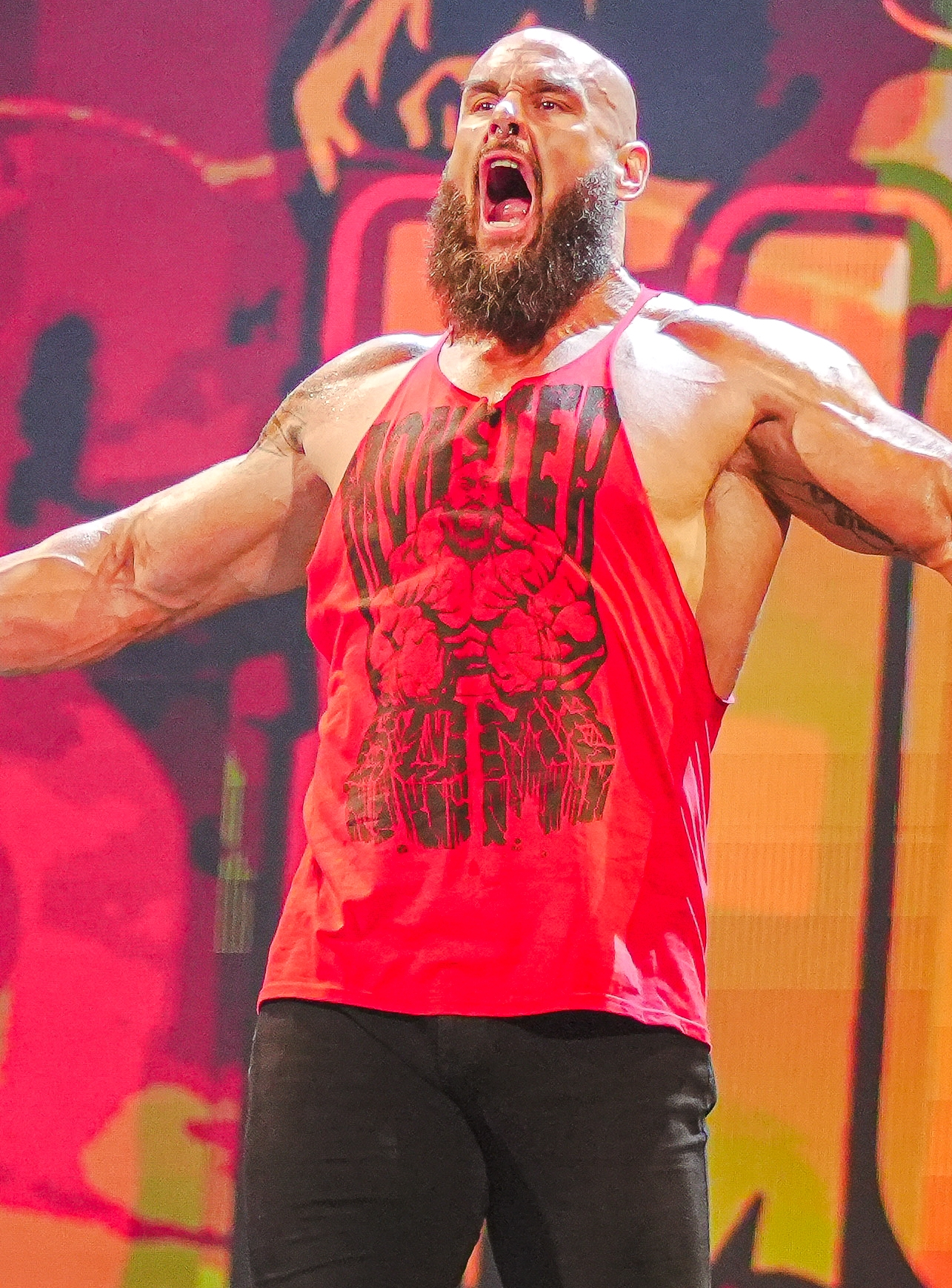
Braun Strowman

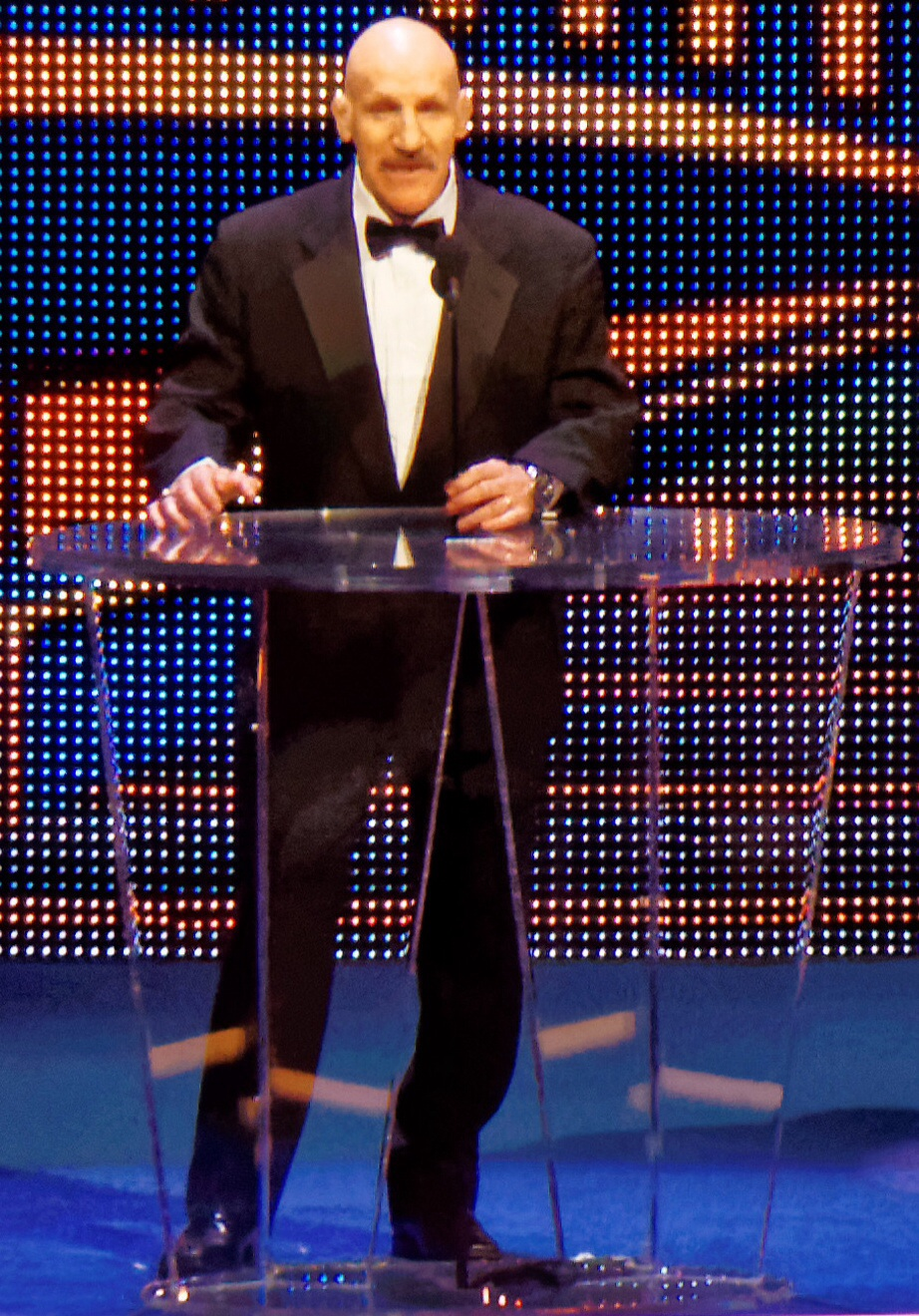
Bruno Sammartino

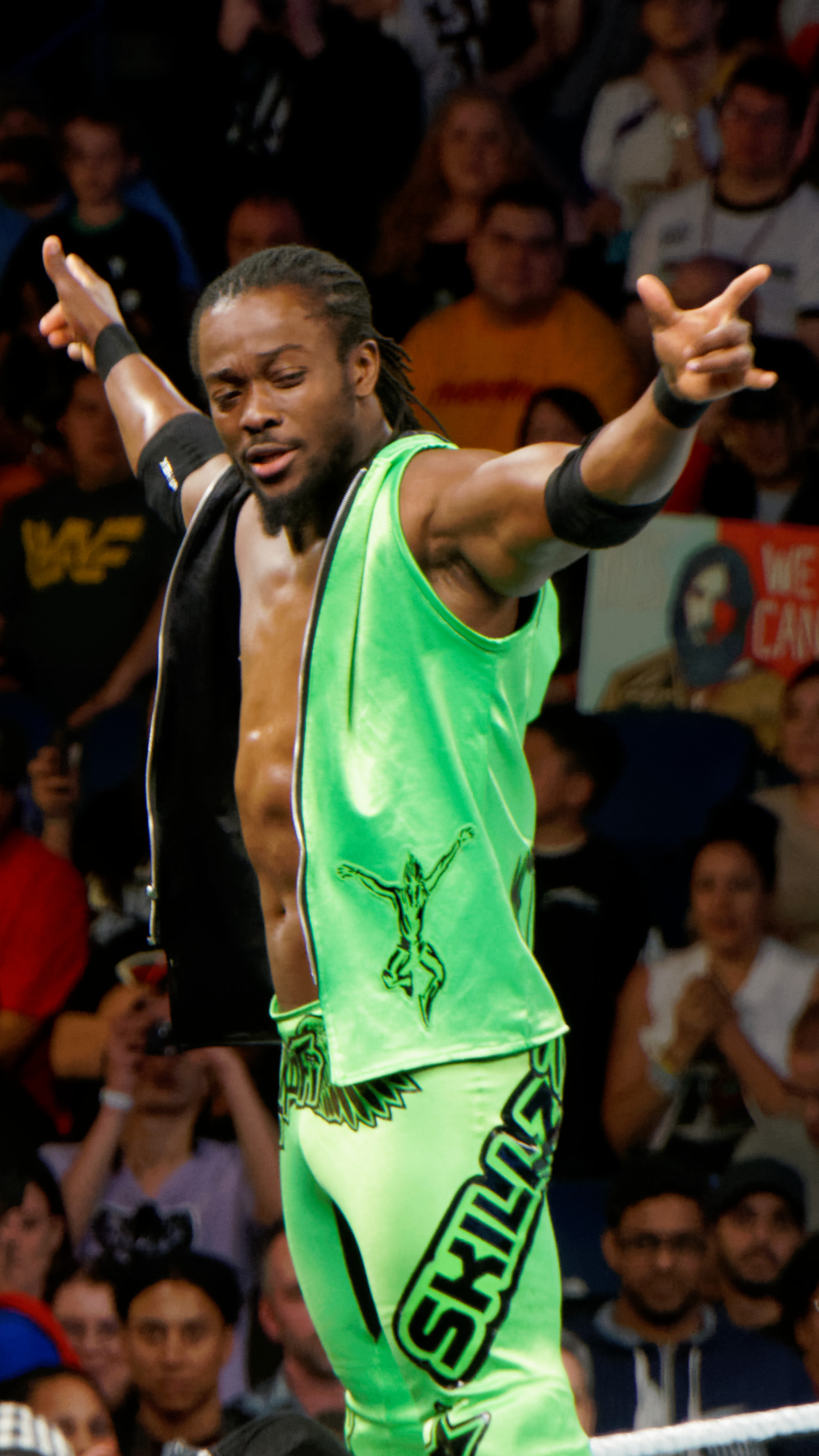
Kofi Kingston

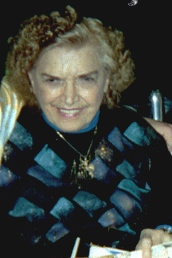
Mae Young

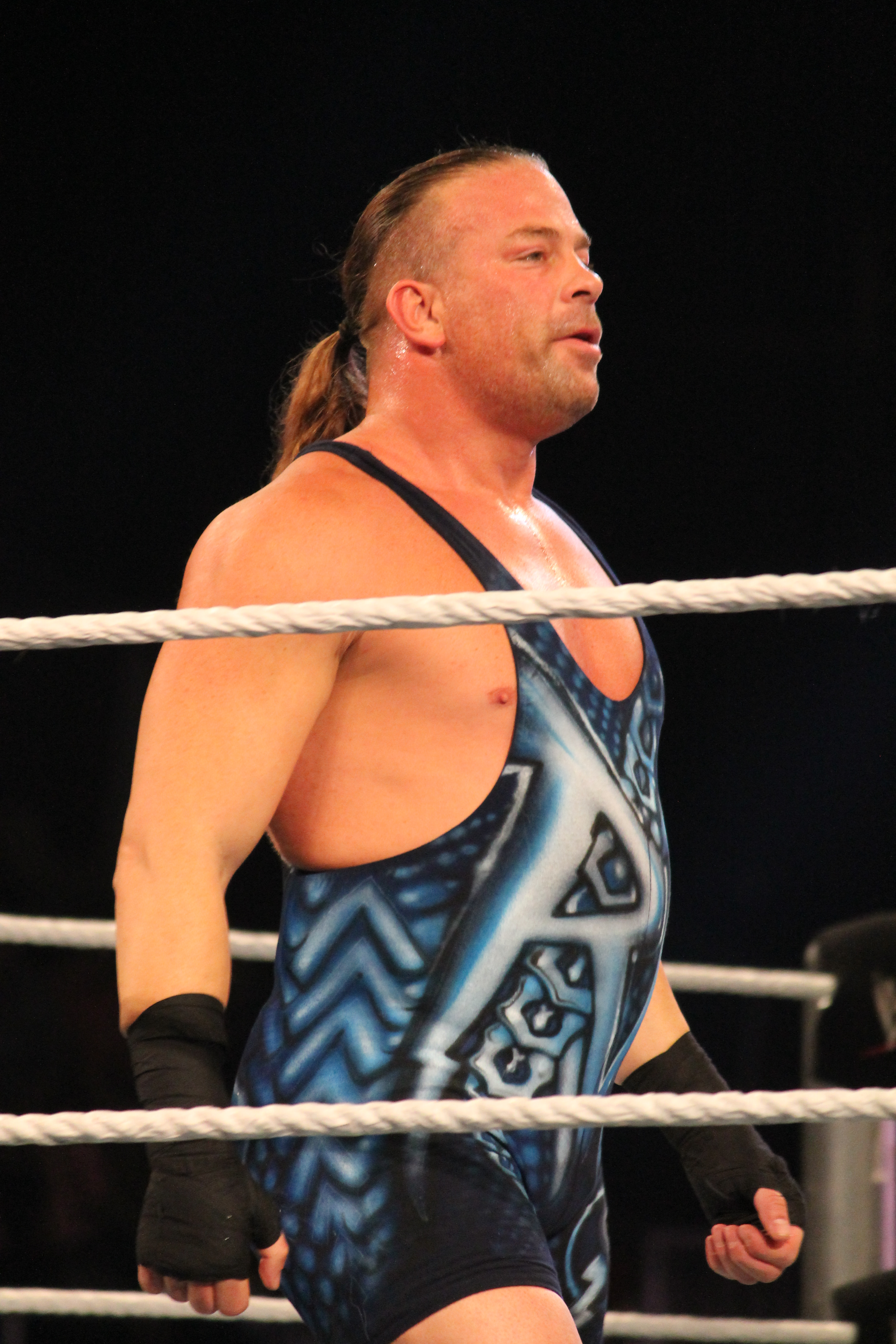
Rob Van Dam

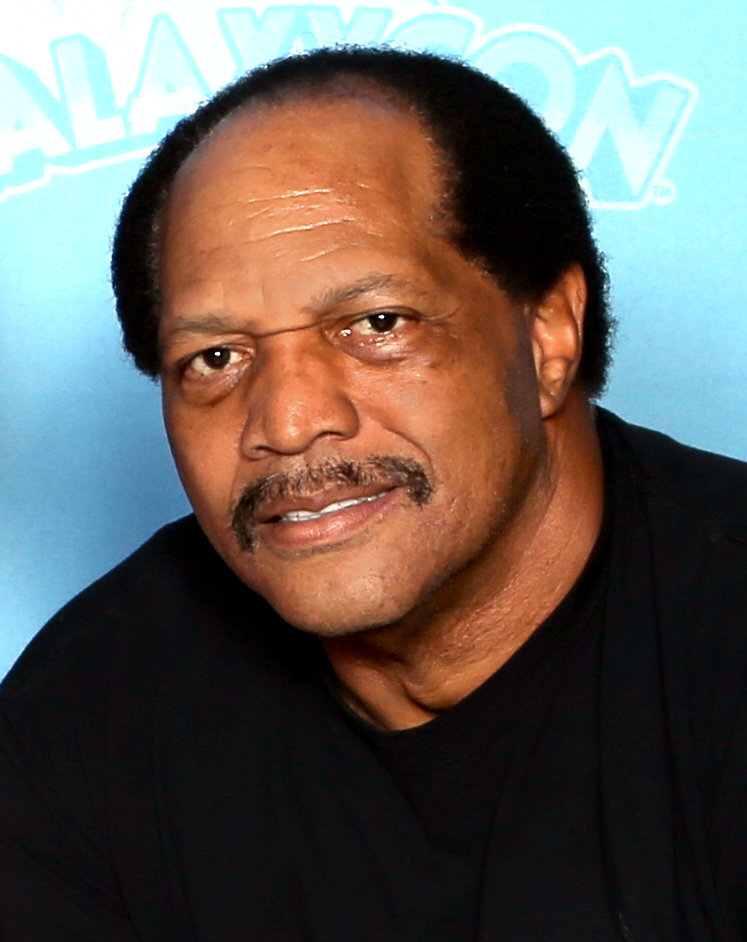
Ron Simmons

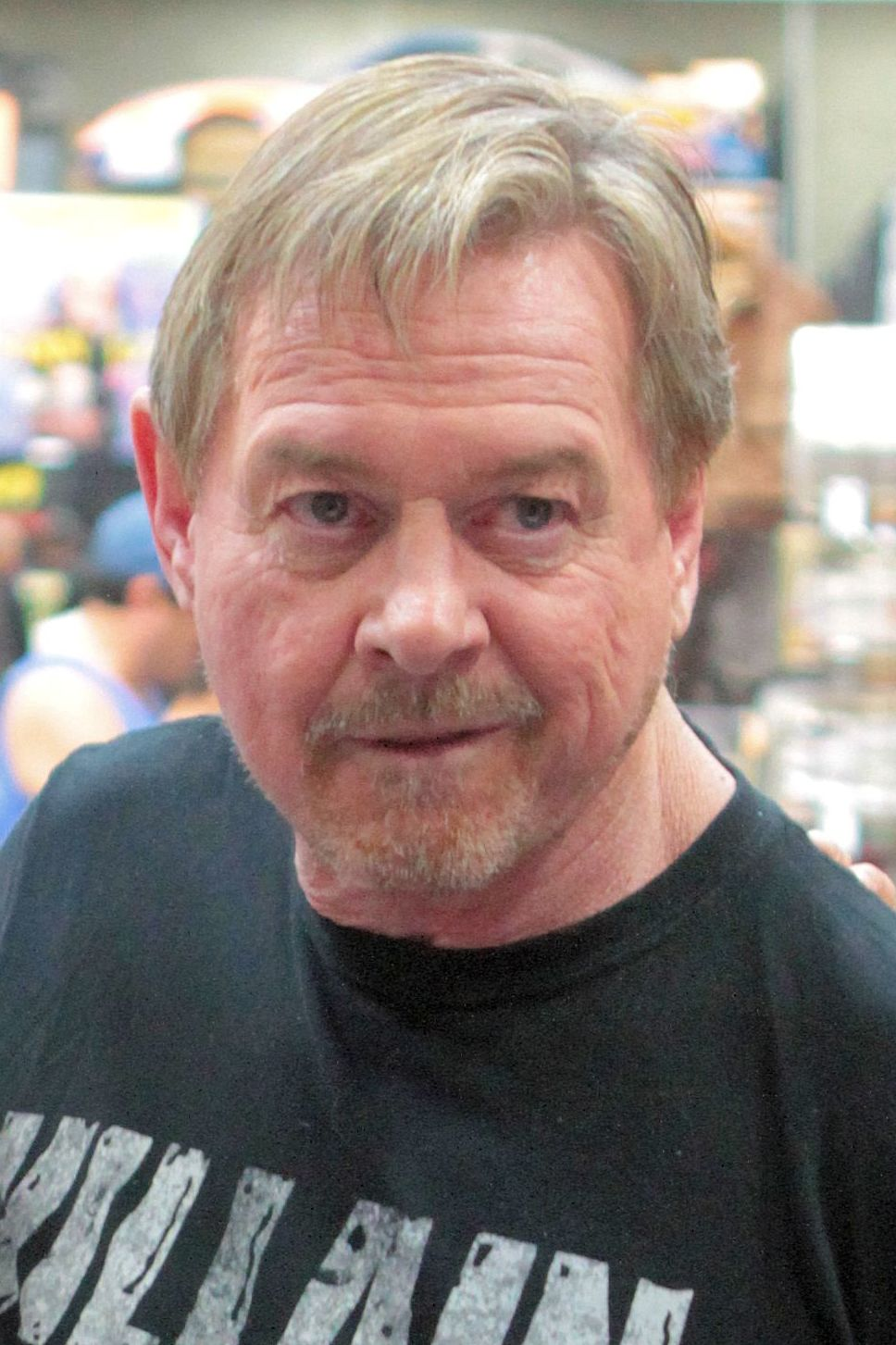
"Rowdy" Roddy Piper

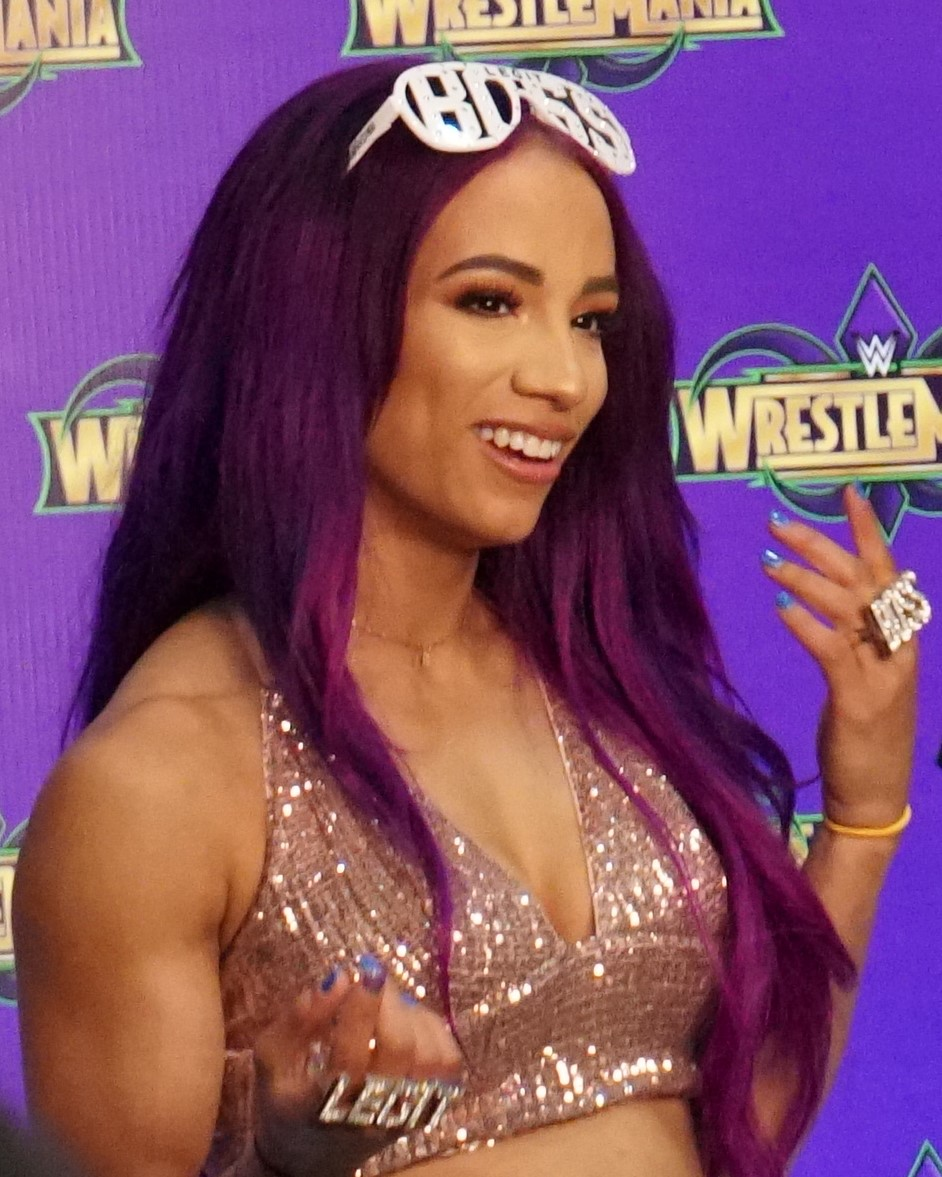
Sasha Banks

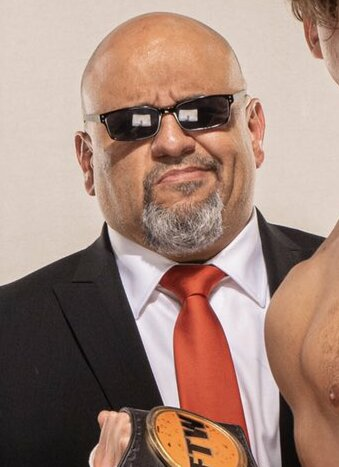
Tazz

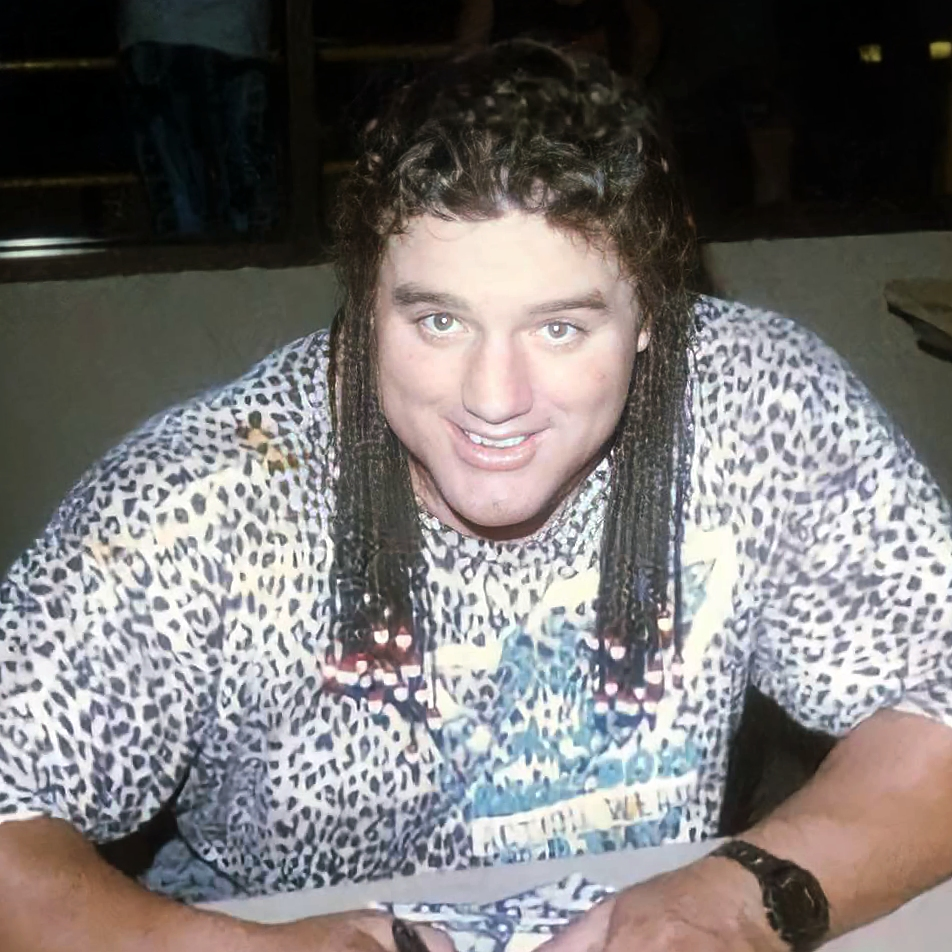
The British Bulldog

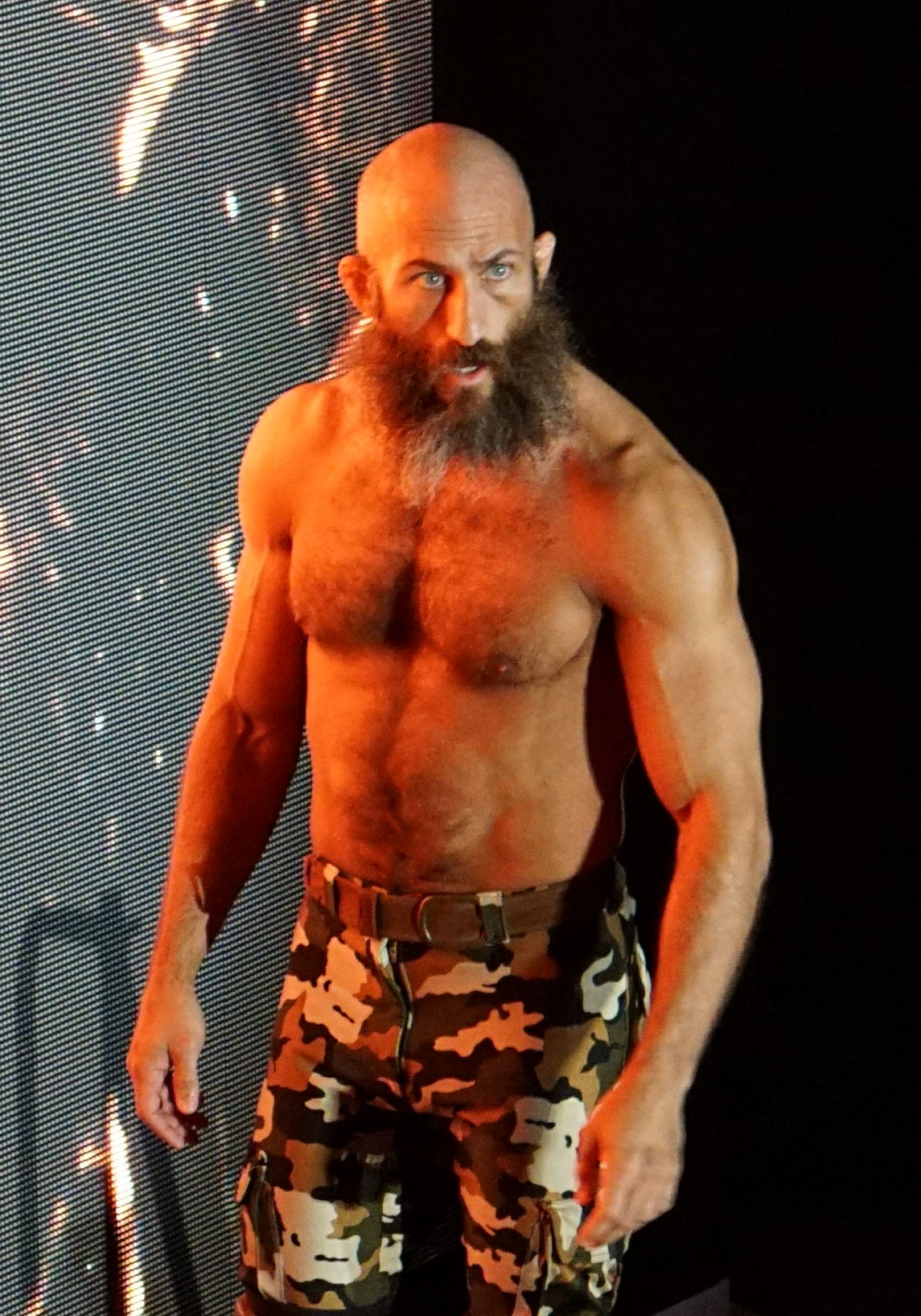
Tommaso Ciampa

Key
†	Indicates they are deceased
‡	Indicates they died while they were employed with WWE

Birth name	Ring name(s)	Tenure	Ref.
Gary Sabaugh	The Italian Stallion	1994–1995	
Amanda Saccomanno	Mandy Rose	2015–2022	
Olena Sadovska	Zena Sterling	2023–2026	
Jerome Saganovich	Jerry Sags	1990–1993	
Masa Saito ^{†}	Masa Saito	1981–1984	
Kazma Sakamoto	Sakamoto	2011–2013	
Ryan Sakoda ^{†}	Sakoda	2003–2004	
Bruno Sammartino ^{†}	Bruno Sammartino	1959–1988	
David Sammartino	David Sammartino; Bruno Sammartino Jr.	1984–1985	
Peter Sanchez ^{†}	Pete Sanchez	1958–1992	
Kofi Sarkodie-Mensah	Kofi Kingston	2006–2026	
Allen Sarven	Al Snow; Avatar; Leif Cassidy; Shinobi; Steve Moore; Five Star Ninja	1993; 1995-1997; 1998-2008	
Akio Sato	Sato; Shinja	1990–1991; 1994–1995	
Shigeki Sato	Dick Togo	1998	
Meiko Satomura	Meiko Satomura	2020–2025	
Benjamin Satterley^{†}	Adrian Neville; Neville	2012–2018	
Perry Satullo	Perry Saturn	2000–2002	
Oliver Sauter	Oliver Carter; Oro Mensah	2019–2025	
Hugo Savinovich	Hugo Savinovich	1994–2011	
Angelo Savoldi ^{†}	Angelo Savoldi	1963–1972	
Ashley Sebera	Dana Brooke	2013–2023	
Joe Scarpa ^{†}	Chief Jay Strongbow	1970–1977; 1979–1984; 1993–1994	
Noah Schiavone	Tony Schiavone	1989–1990	
Adam Scherr	Braun Strowman	2013–2021; 2022–2025	
Sherri Schrull ^{†}	"Sensational" Sherri Martel	1987–1993	
David Schultz	"Dr. D" David Schultz	1984–1985	
Mikel Scicluna ^{†}	"Baron" Mikel Scicluna	1965–1970; 1972; 1975–1983	
Jeffrey Sciullo	Elias; Elias Samson; Ezekiel; El Vagabundo	2014–2023	
George Scott	George Scott	1983–1986	
Nuufolau Joel Seanoa	Samoa Joe	2015–2021; 2021–2022	
Kurt Sellers	James Curtis; KC James	2006-2008	
Gzim Selmani	Rezar	2015–2020; 2024–2025	
Peter Senerchia	Tazz	1996; 1999–2009	
Theresa Serrano	Zoey Stark	2021–2026	
Daniel Severn	Dan "The Beast" Severn	1998–1999	
Patty Seymour	Leilani Kai	1985–1989; 1994	
Marina Shafir	Marina Shafir	2018–2021	
Michael Shane	Jake Gymini	2005–2007	
Todd Shane	Jesse Gymini	2005-2007	
Michael Sharpe ^{†}	"Iron" Mike Sharpe	1983–1995	
Samuel Shaw	Dexter Lumis	2019–2022; 2022–2026	
Michael Shaw ^{†}	Bastion Booger; Friar Ferguson	1993–1994	
Genichro Shimada	Tenryu	1991; 1993–1994	
Hisashi Shinma ^{†}	Hisashi Shinma	1978–1984	
Kensuke Shinzaki	Hakushi	1994–1996	
Erika Shishido	Aja Kong	1995	
Lawrence Shreve	Abdullah the Butcher	1972; 1985	
Walter Sieber ^{†}	Waldo Von Erich	1964–1966; 1969–1975	
Morris Siegel ^{†}	Morris Siegel	1956–1959	
William Sierra	Bill Alfonso	1993–1995	
Gurvinder Sihra	Gurv Sihra; Sunil Singh	2016–2021	
Harvinder Sihra	Harv Sihra; Samir Singh	2016–2021	
Paulo César da Silva	Giant Silva	1998–1999	
Brandon Silvestry	Kaval; Low-Ki	2008–2010	
Ronald Simmons	Faarooq; Faarooq Asaad; Ron Simmons	1996–2004; 2006–2009	
Lawrence Simon ^{†}	Boris Malenko	1950s–1960s mid-1980s	
Dean Simon	Dean Malenko	2000–2019	
Rhonda Sing ^{†}	Bertha Faye	1995–1996	
Arnold Skaaland ^{†}	Arnold Skaaland	1963–1994	
Charles Skaggs	2 Cold Scorpio; Flash Funk	1996–1999; 2006–2007	
Jon Skrypnyk	Jon Cutler; Prime Cut	2008–2009	
Steven Slocum	Jackson Andrews	2009–2011	
Ashton Smith	Ashton Smith	2018–2022	
Aurelian Smith Jr.	Jake "The Snake" Roberts	1986-1992; 1996-1997	
Chloe Smith	Dani Luna	2019–2022	
David Smith ^{†}	The British Bulldog; Davey Boy Smith	1984–1988; 1990–1992; 1994–1997; 1999–2000	
Harry Smith	DH Smith; David Hart Smith	2006–2011; 2021	
Michael Smith	Sam Houston	1987–1989; 1991	
Robin Smith	Rockin' Robin	1987–1990	
Timothy Smith ^{†}	Timothy Well; Rex King	1987–1988; 1993–1995	
William Smithson ^{†}	Moondog Spike	1981	
James Snuka	Deuce; Sim Snuka	2005–2009	
Lisa Sole	Victoria	2000–2009	
Chris Spradlin	Kassius Ohno	2011-2013; 2016-2020	
Edward Spulnik ^{†}	Killer Kowalski; Executioner	1957–1958; 1962–1964; 1968–1970; 1974–1977	
Tracy Smothers ^{†}	Freddie Joe Floyd; Tracy Smothers	1996–1997; 1999–2000	
William Snip ^{†}	Billy Red Lyons	1984–1992	
Eugene Snitsky	Gene Snitsky; Snitsky	2004–2008	
Merced Solis	Tito Santana; El Matador	1979–1980; 1983–1993; 1997–1998	
Daniel Solwold Jr.	Austin Aries	2016–2017	
Monty Sopp	Billy Gunn; Billy G Billy; Mr. Ass; Rockabilly	1993–2004; 2012–2015	
Charles Spencer	Tony Mamaluke	2005; 2006-2007	
Daniel Spivey	Danny Spivey; Waylon Mercy	1985–1988; 1995	
Scott Stanford	Scott Stanford	2009–2025	
Rycklon Stephens	Ezekiel; Ezekiel Jackson	2008–2014	
Herman Stevens Jr.	Clarence Mason	1996–1997	
Kia Stevens	Kharma	2010–2012	
Carl Stevens ^{†}	Ray Stevens	1967; 1972–1973; 1982	
Courtney Stewart	Isla Dawn	2018–2025	
Peter Stilsbury	Outback Jack	1986–1988	
George Stipich ^{†}	Stan Stasiak	1971–1979	
Shawn Stipich	Meat; Planet Stasiak; Shawn Stasiak	1999; 2001-2002	
Sarah Stock	Sarah Stock	2015–2020	
Stephon Strickland	Isaiah "Swerve" Scott	2019–2021	
Kevin Sullivan ^{†}	Kevin Sullivan	1975–1976	
Sharmell Sullivan	Sharmell; Sharmell Sullivan; Queen Sharmell	2001; 2005–2007	
Thomas Sullivan ^{†}	Johnny Valiant; Johnny V Luscious Johnny; John L. Sullivan	1968-1970; 1972; 1974-1975; 1978-1981; 1984-1988	
John Sutton ^{†}	Oliver Humperdink	1987–1988	
Hiroko Suzuki	Hiroko	2004–2005	
Kenzo Suzuki	Kenzo Suzuki	2004–2005	
Richard Swann	Rich Swann	2015–2018	
Tamara Sytch	Sunny; Tamara Murphy	1994–1998	
Robert Szatkowski	Rob Van Dam	2001–2007; 2013–2014	
Debbie Szestecki	Debbie Combs	1986–1987	
Terry Szopinski	The Warlord	1988–1992	
Yoshihiro Tajiri	Yoshihiro Tajiri; Tajiri; Tajiri Claus	1997; 2001–2005; 2006; 2016–2017	
Sean Tan Li Hao	Dante Chen	2021–2026	
Patrick Tanaka	Tanaka	1990–1992; 1993–1994	
Papaliitele Taogaga ^{†}	Siva Afi; High Chief Afi	1985–1988	
Noriyo Tateno	Noriyo Tateno	1988	
Newton Tattrie ^{†}	Geeto Mongol	1970–1972	
David Taylor	Dave Taylor	2006-2008	
John Tenta Jr. ^{†}	Canadian Earthquake; Earthquake; Golga	1989–1993; 1994; 1998–1999; 2001	
Phillip Theis	Damien Demento	1992–1993	
Bradley Thomas	Bradley Jay; Jay Bradley; Ryan Braddock	2005–2009	
Sylvester Terkay	Sylvester Terkay	2006–2007	
Taryn Terrell	Tiffany	2007–2010	
Josh Terry	Josh Morrell; Riley Osborne	2019–2025	
Eric Thompson	Rick Victor; Viktor	2011–2019	
Axel Tischer	Alexander Wolfe; Axel Tischer	2015–2021	
John Toland	James Dick	2003–2006	
Chris Tolos ^{†}	Chris Tolos	1963–1964	
John Tolos ^{†}	John Tolos; The Coach	1963–1964; 1973–1974; 1990–1991	
Travis Tomko	Tyson Tomko	2002–2006	
Roderick Toombs ^{†}	"Rowdy" Roddy Piper	1984–1996; 2003; 2005–2014	
Eve Torres	Eve Torres	2007-2013	
Camille Tourville ^{†}	Tarzan Tyler	1965–1966; 1971–1972	
Eric Tovey ^{†}	Lord Littlebrook	1960s–1970s 1986–1987	
Ray Traylor Jr. ^{†}	Big Boss Man; The Bossman	1988–1993; 1998–2003	
Clifford Treiber	Domino	2005–2008; 2010	
Thea Trinidad	Zelina Vega; Zelina	2017–2020; 2021–2026	
Shian-Li Tsang ^{†}	Mrs. Yamaguchi-San	1998	
Gabbi Tuft	Tyler Reks	2008–2012	
John Tunney Jr. ^{†}	Jack Tunney	1984–1995	
Joseph Turco ^{†}	Joe Turco	1970–1971	
Sesugh Uhaa	Apollo Crews; Apollo	2015–2026	
Inyene Umoh	Edris Enofé	2021–2025	
Ashley Urbanski	Shotzi; Shotzi Blackheart	2019–2025	
Luis Ignacio Uribe	Sin Cara	2010–2014	
Joseph Utsler	Shaggy 2 Dope	1998	
Gertrude Vachon ^{†}	Luna Vachon	1993–1994; 1997–2000	
Sione Vailahi	The Barbarian; Sione	1988–1992; 1994–1995	
Levis Valenzuela Jr.	Levis Valenzuela Jr. No Way Jose	2015–2020	
Mercedes Varnado	Sasha Banks	2012–2022	
Hossein Vaziri ^{†}	Col. Mustafa; Iron Sheik; Great Hussien the Arab	1979–1980; 1983–1987; 1988; 1991–1992; 1996–1998	
Cain Velasquez	Cain Velasquez	2019–2020	
Shane Veryzer	Shane Thorne; Slapjack	2016–2021	
Thea Vidale	Mama Benjamin	2006	
Daniel Vidot	Xyon Quinn	2018–2024	
Richard Vigneault	"The Model" Rick Martel	1980–1982; 1986–1995	
Brendan Vink	Brendan Vink; Duke Hudson	2019–2025	
Adnan Virk	Adnan Virk	2021	
Daniel Vollmayer	Dan Vollmayer	2019–2021	
Kevin Wacholz	Nailz	1992	
Sean Waltman	The 1-2-3 Kid; X-Pac	1993–1996; 1998–2002	
Austin Watson	Xavier Woods	2010–2026	
Feicheng Wang	Ru Feng	2021–2022	
Yanbo Wang	Boa	2016–2024	
James Ware	Koko B. Ware	1986–1994	
Christopher Warren ^{†}	Chris Warren	1997–2000; 2009	
Charles Warrington	Beaver Cleavage; Chaz; Headbanger Mosh; Chaz Ware	1993; 1995–2001; 2016	
Tyler Warner	Brad Maddox; Lord Ruffus; Joshua Kingsley	2010–2015	
Dennis Waters^{†}	Johnny Powers	1964	
Katarina Waters	Katie Lea Burchill; Katie Lea	2008–2010	
Gavin Watkins	Flash Morgan Webster	2018–2022	
William Watts Jr. ^{†}	Bill Watts	1964–1965; 1995	
Erik Watts	Troy	1995—1996	
Alicia Webb	Ryan Shamrock	1998–1999	
Benjamin Webb	Trent Seven	2016–2022	
Amy Weber	Amy Weber	2004–2005	
Édouard Ignacz Weiczorkiewicz^{†}	Edouard Carpentier	1967-1968; 1985–1992	
George Wells ^{+}	George Wells	1985–1986	
Cory Weston	Blake; Cory Weston; Wesley Blake	2013–2021	
Pezavan Whatley ^{†}	Pez Whatley	1990–1991	
John Watson	Mikey Whipwreck	1996	
Lowell Weicker ^{†}	Lowell Weicker	1999–2011	
Daniel Wheeler	Dash Wilder	2014–2020	
Lawrence Whistler	Larry Zbyszko	1974–1980	
Anthony White	Saba Simba; Tony Atlas	1980-1982; 1983-1987; 1990-1991; 2008-2010	
Bill White ^{†}	Wild Bill White	1971–1975	
Edward White ^{†}	Moondog King	1981	
Leon White ^{†}	Vader	1996–1998; 2005	
Timothy White ^{†}	Tim White	1985–2009	
Tommaso Whitney	Thomas Whitney; Ciampa; Tommaso Ciampa	2005-2007; 2015–2026	
Eldon Whittler ^{†}	Smasher Sloan	1964–1968; 1972	
Brian Wickens	Bushwhacker Luke	1988–1996	
Charles Wicks	Chad Dick	2004-2006	
Stephanie Wiand	Stephanie Wiand	1994–1995	
Matthew Wiese	Luther Reigns	2004-2005	
Paul Wight	Big Show; Paul Wight	1999-2007; 2008-2021	
Del Wilkes ^{†}	The Patriot	1997–1998	
Brennan Williams	Brennan Williams; Dio Madden; Mace ma.çé Marcellus Black	2016–2023	
Steven Williams ^{†}	"Dr. Death" Steve Williams	1998–1999; 2003; 2006	
Michelle Wilson	Michelle Wilson	2009–2020; 2023	
Torrie Wilson	Torrie Wilson	2001–2008; 2009	
Barry Windham	Barry Windham; Blackjack Windham; The Stalker; The Widowmaker	1984-1985; 1989-1990; 1996–1998; 2008	
Robert Windham ^{†}	Big Machine; Blackjack Mulligan	1971; 1975; 1982; 1984–1987	
Jonathan Wisniski	Greg "The Hammer" Valentine	1975; 1979; 1981–1982; 1984–1992; 1993–1994	
John Wisniski ^{†}	Johnny Valentine	1959–1962; 1965–1966	
Kelly Wolfe	Wolfie D	1995; 1996–1997	
Les Wolff ^{†}	"Beautiful" Buddy Wolfe	1972–1973	
Bruce Woyan ^{†}	"Bulldog" Buzz Sawyer	1984	
Charles Wright	The Godfather; The Goodfather; Kama; Kama Mustafa; Papa Shango	1991-1993; 1995-1996; 1997-2001; 2002	
Chris Wright	C. W. Anderson; Christopher W. Anderson	2004–2007	
Drake Wuertz	Drake Wuertz	2014–2021	
Juanita Wright ^{†}	Sapphire	1989–1990	
Lena Yada	Lena Yada	2005–2008	
Naofumi Yamamoto	Yoshi Tatsu	2009–2014	
Yusuke Yamaguchi ^{†}	Yamaguchi-san	1998	
Itsuki Yamazaki	Itsuki Yamazaki	1987–1988	
Brian Yandrisovitz	Brian Knobbs	1990–1993	
Jie Yin	Erica Yan	2021–2022	
Takao Yoshida	Taka Michinoku	1997–2002	
Barry Young	Wolfgang	2016–2025	
Johnnie Young ^{‡}	Mae Young	1999–2014	
Richard Young	Ricky Ortiz	2007-2009	
Karen Yu	Wendy Choo	2019–2026	
James Yun	Akio; Jimmy Wang Yang; Yang	2003–2005; 2006–2010	
Airica Zayas	Anya Rune	2026	
Thomas Zenk ^{†}	Tom Zenk	1986–1987	
Xia Zhao	Xia Li	2017–2024	
Stephen Zold	Steve Zold	1950s	

== See also ==
- List of WWE personnel
