= Kai En Tai =

Professional wrestling stable

Kaientai

Stable
- Members: Dick Togo; Men’s Teioh; Shiryu; Taka Michinoku; Funaki; Super Boy; Hanzo Nakajima; Yoshihiro Tajiri; Gran Hamada; Yamaguchi-San (manager- WWF)
- Name(s): Heisei Kaientai; Kaientai Deluxe; Kaientai; Kai En Tai bWo Japan; Club Kamikaze
- Billed from: Japan
- Debut: 1994
- Disbanded: 2001 (WWF)
- Years active: 1994–2001

Kai En Tai (also spelled Kaientai) was a professional wrestling stable made up of Japanese wrestlers Shiryu, Dick Togo and Men’s Teioh, later joined by Sho Funaki and Taka Michinoku. The group was managed by Yamaguchi-San when they were in the WWF.

== History ==
=== Michinoku Pro Wrestling ===
The group debuted in Japan's Michinoku Pro wrestling promotion in late 1994 when SATO, Terry Boy and Shiryu introduced themselves as Heisei Kaientai. The name was based on Japan's first modern corporation, Kaientai ("Naval Auxiliary Force"), a naval institution and paramilitary organization dedicated to freeing Japan from feudal rule and protecting the country's national sovereignty that was a major player in the introduction of the Meiji Restoration.

Heisei Kaientai had many high profile tag team matches before two of them changed their names; SATO became Dick Togo, Terry Boy became Men's Teioh while Shiryu's name remained unchanged. The stable's name was also changed to "Kaientai Deluxe", or Kaientai DX for short. They would later be joined by Yume Kairudo/Dream Hunters (Taka Michinoku and Shoichi Funaki) as new members. Other members included Hanzo Nakajima, Yoshihiro Tajiri, Gran Hamada and Super Boy.

=== Extreme Championship Wrestling ===
In early 1997, Taka Michinoku, Dick Togo and Terry Boy had a short stint in Extreme Championship Wrestling as BWO Japan (also known as "BWO International") and feuded with the fellow Japanese team of The Great Sasuke, Gran Hamada and Gran Naniwa. The rivalry culminated at ECW's first ever Pay-Per-View event Barely Legal 1997 where the team of Sasuke, Hamada and Masato Yakushiji (filling in for an injured Gran Naniwa) came out victorious. Since then, Kaientai would permanently adopt the bWo colors of blue and white as their own.

=== World Wrestling Federation ===
Kaientai (with the exception of Shiryu, who was in WCW under his real name, Kaz Hayashi) made their first appearance in the WWF the night after WrestleMania XIV on the March 30, 1998 episode of Raw is War. The team modified its name to "Kai En Tai" and dropped the 'DX' from their full title due to the existence of D-Generation X in the WWF. They attacked Taka Michinoku—who signed with the WWF much earlier—because they felt he had become Americanized since joining the WWE until he later rejoined them. Kai En Tai was originally referred to by the announcers as Club Kamikaze, but their new manager Yamaguchi-San announced their actual name upon his arrival shortly afterwards.

Their most infamous WWF feud was with Val Venis, who had a porn star gimmick at the time. Yamaguchi was enraged when he was shown a pornographic video of his (onscreen) wife, sleeping with Venis, and threatened to punish both of them. Mrs. Yamaguchi-San was brought to the ring for what was going to be a spanking by Yamaguchi-san using a wooden paddle, but she was rescued by Venis. A week later, just as Venis had finished a match, Yamaguchi and Kaientai showed up with a salami on a table. Yamaguchi proceeded to chop the salami while shouting at Venis, "I choppy choppy your pee pee!"

The following week, Venis teamed up with Taka Michinoku to take on Togo and Funaki in a tag team match. Taka made a swerve, however, by turning against Venis, proclaiming that Mrs. Yamaguchi-San was his sister. Venis was dragged backstage by Kaientai to have his member amputated, though the audience did not see what happened next. Venis returned after a week, explained that Yamaguchi's sword narrowly missed his genitalia, due to the lights being turned off by John Wayne Bobbitt, broke off his relationship with Mrs. Yamaguchi-San and thus ended the feud.

After Togo, Teioh and both Yamaguchis left the WWF, Michinoku and Funaki began wrestling as a tag team using the name Kaientai. They were primarily jobbers, best known for their "Evil! Indeed!" skits in which Bruce Prichard dubbed English voices into their promos while they badly lip-synced, with Taka ending his "comments" with "Evil!" and Funaki "saying" only "Indeed!" Funaki and Taka's last ever tag team partnership as Kaientai in the WWF was a win over Raven and Justin Credible on the October 20, 2001 edition of WWF Jakked.

Michinoku eventually left the WWF. He ran a promotion called Kaientai Dojo (or K-DOJO) until 2019. Funaki remained in the WWF, finding a niche as part of the SmackDown cruiserweight division and as a backstage interviewer before being released from his contract in 2010 after 12 years with the company. However, he has since been re-hired and currently serves as a member of the Japanese commentary team.

=== Michinoku Pro Wrestling ===
With the occasion of Michinoku Pro's 10th Anniversary on November 2, 2003, Kaientai DX reformed, as Dick Togo, Men's Teioh, Taka Michinoku, Shiryu and Hanzo Nakajima took down Jinsei Shinzaki, Hayate, Kesen Numa-jiro, Kazuya Yuasa and Chi-Nen Hokkai.

=== Independent circuit ===
On July 15, 2005, another Kaientai reunion took place at Kaientai Dojo, when Taka Michinoku teamed up with Sho Funaki, Dick Togo and Men's Teioh to do battle with Kengo Mashimo, Kazma, Ryota Chikuzen and Kunio Toshima. Although Kaientai came up short of defeating the opposing team, it was a very emotional moment and the crowd showed their support after the match.

Kaientai reunited once again on the 2006 Indy Summit show on New Year's Eve where Taka Michinoku, Sho Funaki, Kaz Hayashi, Dick Togo and Men's Teioh defeated Makoto Oishi, Kudo, Katsuya Kishi, Shinjitsu Nohashi and Milanito Collection a.t. The Kaientai team claimed victory after Togo hit Oishi with a diving senton. On January 25, 2007, Taka Michinoku, Men's Teioh and Dick Togo appeared in Dragon Gate to take on the team of Cima, BxB Hulk and Matt Sydal.

== Championships ==
- Michinoku Pro Wrestling
  - British Commonwealth Junior Heavyweight Championship (1 time) – Dick Togo
  - UWF Super Welterweight Championship (2 times) – Dick Togo (1 time), Men's Teioh (1 time)
  - FMW Independent World Junior Heavyweight Championship (2 times) – Taka Michinoku
- New Japan Pro-Wrestling
  - IWGP Junior Heavyweight Tag Team Championship (1 time) – Taka Michinoku & Dick Togo (Note: Not listed as Kai En Tai)
- World Wrestling Federation
  - WWF Light Heavyweight Championship (1 time) – Taka Michinoku
  - WWF Hardcore Championship (1 time) – Shoichi Funaki
  - WWE Cruiserweight Championship (1 time) – Shoichi Funaki
