= Yamaguchi Bicycles =

Custom bike frame builder in Rifle, Colorado

Yamaguchi Bicycles is a custom bike frame builder in Rifle, Colorado.

Yamaguchi Bicycles was founded in 1987 by Koichi Yamaguchi, a frame builder who went on to work as the National Team Mechanic for the US Cycling Federation in 1988 and the official frame builder for the United States Olympic Cycling Team in 1989.

Mr. Yamaguchi began at Japan's 3 Rensho company building frames for professional Keirin riders, the most famous being ten-time Sprint World Champion Koichi Nakano. In 1987, he realized that it was time to bring his unique vision of the frame builder's art to the public, and came to the United States where he founded his own company.

The shop specializes in bicycle frames built to the measurements of riders' bodies, as well as training bicycle frame builders.

== See also ==
- Koichi Yamaguchi
