= Eri Yamaguchi =

Eri Yamaguchi may refer to:

- Eri Yamaguchi (cricketer) (山口 栄理, born 1992), Japanese cricketer
- Eri Yamaguchi (runner) (山口 衛里, born 1973), Japanese long-distance runner
