= Takayuki Yamaguchi =

Takayuki Yamaguchi may refer to:

- Takayuki Yamaguchi (footballer) (born 1973), Japanese footballer
- Takayuki Yamaguchi (artist) (born 1966), Japanese manga artist
- Takayuki Yamaguchi (voice actor) (born 1975), Japanese voice actor
