= Tsuyoshi Yamaguchi =

Tsuyoshi Yamaguchi may refer to:

- Tsuyoshi Yamaguchi (curler) (born 1984), Japanese curler
- Tsuyoshi Yamaguchi (politician) (born 1954), Japanese politician
