= Hatsuye Yamaguchi =

Artist

- Born: 1912; Selma, California
- Died: January 24, 2005 (aged 92–93); Los Angeles, California
- Occupation(s): Dollmaker, artist
- Known for: Ikebana, Sakura ningyo

Hatsuye Yamaguchi (1911-2005) was a Japanese-American artist and dollmaker born in Selma, California. She served as a member and president of Los Angeles Doll Makers. She has contributed to Southern California Culture by working on Japanese decorative doll making arts named Sakura Ningyo and Ikebana.

== Career ==
Yamaguchi, who began learning ikebana before World War II, was a prisoner at Manzanar following the enforcement of Executive Order 9066. In 1960, she joined Hokubei Kado Kyokai, an organization established to support ikebana teachers and students. After that, she started practicing the complex art of Japanese decorative dollmaking, known as Sakura Ningyo.

She also served as the president of the Los Angeles Doll Makers Association. For 25 years, her work was displayed in festivals, celebrations, and exhibitions. She got her inspiration from Japanese history, literature, and folk customs. Yamaguchi was also a frequent exhibitor at the Nisei Week Festival. Her work includes Omoi (Reminiscence), Renshishi (Two Lions - Father and Son), and many others made of silk, cotton, straw, and paper.

== Honors and recognition ==
On August 11, 1991, she was among the five native Californians of Japanese ancestry recognized at the Nisei week festival for their lifetime achievements.

== Personal life ==
Yamaguchi married Kataro Yamaguchi, and the couple resided in Los Angeles, California. They had four children that included one daughter, and three sons. She had twelve grandchildren and 5 great-grandchildren. Yamaguchi died on January 24, 2005, at the age of 93. Her funeral was held on January 31, 2005, at 11:00 a.m. in Zenshuji Soto Mission, Los Angeles.
