= Koichi Yamaguchi =

Koichi Yamaguchi (山口弘一) is a noted Japanese bicycle frame builder, based in the United States.

Koichi was trained as a Master framebuilder at the legendary 3Rensho company in Japan, building bicycles for professional Keirin riders (notably, the ten-time Sprint World Champion Koichi Nakano).

In 1987, Koichi came to the United States and founded his own bicycle building company, Yamaguchi Bicycles, now based in Rifle, Colorado. He began working closely with the US Cycling Federation as the National Team Mechanic in 1988 and, in 1989, his projects included prototype frames for the US National Cycling Team. That same year, Koichi became the official framebuilder for the United States Olympic Cycling Team.

Koichi was honored for his contributions to competitive cycling as the first framebuilder to become an Olympic Flame runner at the 2002 Winter Olympics in Salt Lake City, Utah.

Koichi Yamaguchi's bicycle designs have been ridden by winning competitive bicyclists and bicycling teams:

- 1992 Barcelona Olympics 1 km Time Trial Bronze Medal Erin Hartwell. Team USA;
- 1992 United States Professional Racing Organization Criterium Champion Mike McCarthy;
- 1992 World Championships Gold Medal. Professional Individual Pursuit Mike McCarthy;
- 1992 World Championship winners - US Women's 50 km Team time trial squad;
- 1995 Madison National Champion Steve Hegg;
- 2000 Paralympic Games Time Trial Gold Medal and World Record time winners, Team USA Tandem members Al Whaley and Pam Fernandez.

== See also ==
- Yamaguchi Bicycles
