= Noboru Yamaguchi =

Noboru Yamaguchi may refer to:

- Noboru Yamaguchi (author) (ヤマグチ ノボル, 1972–2013), Japanese writer
- Noboru Yamaguchi (yakuza) (山口 登, 1902–1942), Japanese yakuza
