= Satoshi Yamaguchi =

Satoshi Yamaguchi may refer to:

- Satoshi Yamaguchi (footballer, born 1959), Japanese footballer
- Satoshi Yamaguchi (footballer, born 1978), Japanese footballer
- Satoshi Yamaguchi, Japanese musician with the band Radwimps
