= Yutaka Yamaguchi =

Yutaka Yamaguchi (山口 泰, Yamaguchi Yutaka; born 11 December 1940) serves as a member of the Group of Thirty, an international body of leading financiers and academics. He is a former Vice Governor of the Bank of Japan (日本銀行), and was promoted to the position in 1998, following 34 years of continuous service. He earned a degree in economics from the University of Tokyo in 1964. He is a member in the Group of Thirty.
