= Wally Yamaguchi =

Japanese wrestling manager (1958–2019)

Personal information
- Born: Yusuke Yamaguchi; 5 May 1958 Tokyo, Japan
- Died: 9 March 2019 (aged 60)

Professional wrestling career
- Ring name(s): Yusuke Yamaguchi; Wally Yamaguchi; Yamaguchi-san; Mr. Toyota
- Billed height: 5 ft 3 in (1.60 m)
- Billed weight: 137 lb (62 kg)
- Debut: 1980s

Yusuke "Wally" Yamaguchi (May 5, 1958 – March 9, 2019) better known by his ring name Yamaguchi-san, was a Japanese professional wrestling manager and sports journalist. Yamaguchi was a former writer for Gong Magazine, and attained his greatest fame in the World Wrestling Federation (WWF), as the manager of Kai En Tai in 1998.

== Professional wrestling career ==
A lifelong fan of professional wrestling, Yamaguchi's career began in the 1970s as a writer for Gong Magazine. In the 1980s, he began working for various Japanese promotions in both behind-the-scenes and in-ring positions such as referee, manager, and commentator. Because of his fluency in English, he was responsible for booking gaijin talent in Japan, as well as booking Japanese talent overseas. He would also accompany Japanese talent booked overseas to not only oversee the tour, but to assist them in making the travel easier and fun.

=== World Wrestling Federation (1998) ===
In March 1998, Yamaguchi signed with the World Wrestling Federation (WWF) under the ring name Yamaguchi-san. He recruited Sho Funaki, Mens Teioh, and Dick Togo to form the stable Kai En Tai, who feuded with Taka Michinoku. They defeated Michinoku and Bradshaw at the Over The Edge pay-per-view. Following this, the stable began a storyline with Val Venis, who had been sleeping with Yamaguchi-san's wife, Kiyoko, with an enraged Yamaguchi-san being shown a pornographic video of the incident. The following week, during a Val Venis match, Yamaguchi-san cut a promo in which he chopped a salami in two with a sword as a threat to Venis that he would "choppy choppy [his] pee pee".

Taka Michinoku turned on Venis during a tag team match against Togo and Funaki, effectively turning heel and joining Kaientai, Mrs. Yamaguchi was also later revealed to be Michinoku's sister. Venis was dragged backstage to seemingly have his penis amputated, which led to the infamous "castration" scene on the 3 August episode of Raw Is War. Venis later explained that Yamaguchi's sword narrowly missed his penis, owing to a "little shrinkage" and some timely assistance from "friend" John Wayne Bobbitt.

Yamaguchi, Togo and Teioh were later granted their release and returned to Japan, while Taka and Funaki stayed and became a regular tag team.

== Personal life ==
Yamaguchi's younger brother, Shun, currently works for WWE as a Japanese commentator for pay-per-view events.

== Death ==
Yamaguchi suffered a stroke in December 2017 that left him bedridden. He died on 9 March 2019 at age 60, after a lengthy battle with an undisclosed illness.
