= Max Haushofer =

German painter

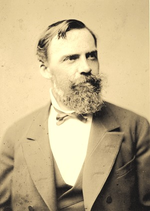
- Born: 12 September 1811; Nymphenburg, Germany
- Died: 24 August 1866 (aged 54); Starnberg, Germany
- Other name: Maximilian Joseph Haushofer
- Occupations: Landscape painter, Professor

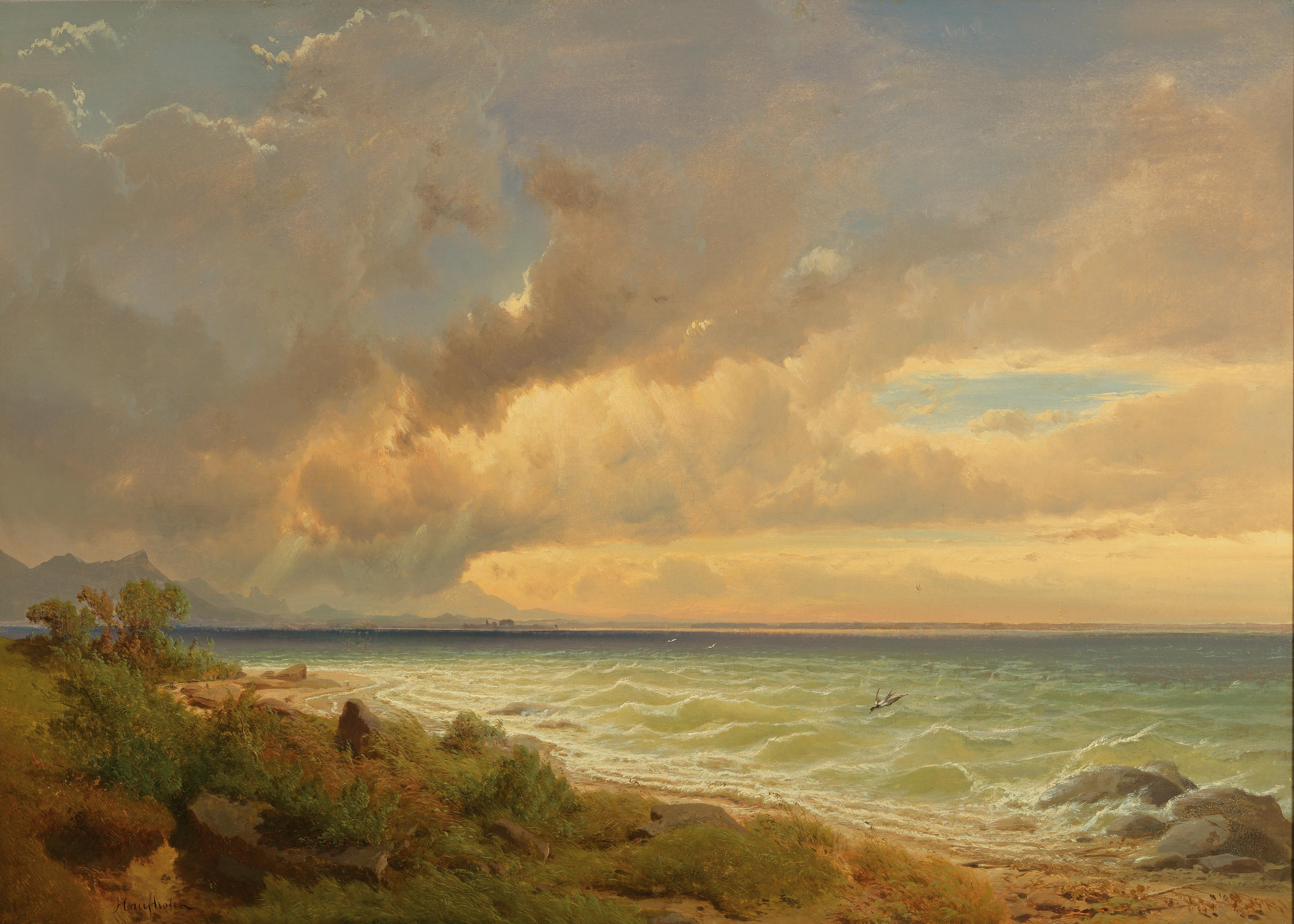
Chiemsee from the East

Maximilian Joseph Haushofer (12 September 1811 – 24 August 1866) was a German landscape painter and professor of landscape painting at the Prague Academy of Fine Arts.

== Biography ==
He was born in Nymphenburg, the son of a tutor at the court of the Bavarian King Maximilian I. Haushofer's godfather was the King himself. At first, at the wish of his father, he studied law, but soon turned to painting. In 1828 he moved with some friends to the shores of the Chiemsee, where he taught himself to draw from nature. Here he married Anna Dumbser, daughter of the proprietor of the Inselwirt on the island of Frauenchiemsee, and made a temporary home. The cessation of landscape classes at the Munich Art Academy obliged him to take lessons for a short time from Joseph Anton Sedlmayr (1797–1863), and later from Carl Friedrich Heinzmann (1795–1846). From 1829 he was a member of the Corps Bavaria Munich. In 1832 he moved on to the landscape at the Königssee, and in 1835, Lake Starnberg. In the years 1836 and 1837 he travelled to Italy to expand his artistic horizons.

His work was shown to the public for the first time in 1833 at the Munich Art Society, and in 1843 he had his first exhibition in Prague.

The professor of historical painting Christian Ruben, who was married to Anna Dumbser's sister, was the rector of the Prague Academy. Ruben obtained for Haushofer a position as professor of landscape painting which he held from 1845 to 1866. He taught his students contemporary painting, with a special focus on painting from nature, and they regularly accompanied him on trips to the painters' colony at Frauenchiemsee. Among them were Adolf Kosárek and Julius Mařák.

In 1849 he applied unsuccessfully for a post at the Munich Art Academy. A few months before his death he returned to Starnberg in his native Bavaria. He was the grandfather of Karl Haushofer.

== Sources ==
- Czech 19th Century Painting, National Gallery of Prague, 1998
- Julius Mařák and his Pupils, National Gallery of Prague, 1999 ISBN 978-80-7035-206-9
- Inge Eichler: Aufbruch in die Landschaft: Die Entstehung der Künstlerkolonien im 19. Jahrhundert..., Museumsgesellschaft Kronberg, 1989
- Ruth Negendack: Ländliche Bohème an den Ufern des Chiemsees. In: Bayerische Staatszeitung, 2006
- Hyacinth Holland (1880). "Haushofer, Max" . Allgemeine Deutsche Biographie (in German). Vol. 11. Leipzig: Duncker & Humblot. pp. 92–93.
- Constantin von Wurzbach: "Haushofer, Max." In: Biographisches Lexikon des Kaiserthums Oesterreich (Biographical Lexicon of the Empire of Austria). Part 8 Kaiserlich-königliche Hof- und Staatsdruckerei, Vienna 1862, p. 87 f. (digitalised).
