= Adolf Kosárek =

Czech painter

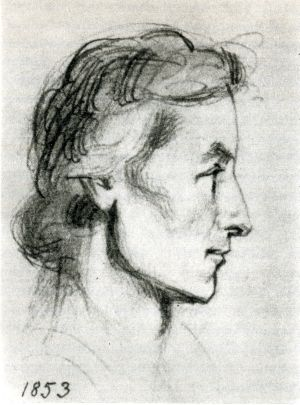
Portrait sketch of Kosárek by Viktor Barvitius

Adolf Kosárek (6 January 1830 – 29 October 1859) was a Czech landscape painter in the Realist style.

== Biography ==
Kosárek was born on 6 January 1830 in Herálec, Bohemia, Austrian Empire. His parents were employed as servants by the Trauttmansdorff family. When he was three, his family moved to Chlumek, where his father became the administrator of a meierhof. From an early age, he displayed an interest in art, but his father wanted him to enter the civil service, so he sent him to learn clerking from a relative.

After completing his primary education, he worked as a clerk until his drawings were noticed by Archbishop Schwarzenberg, who arranged for him to take the entrance exams at the Academy of Fine Arts, Prague, and provided him with a small stipend. He was accepted and, after preliminary studies, entered the landscape painting classes taught by Max Haushofer. He held his first exhibition in 1853. Later, he took a study trip to the Bavarian Alps, financed with money from the sales of his paintings.

In 1855, he settled in the Malá Strana district of Prague and opened a studio. From then on, he had to support himself entirely from the sales of his paintings, usually for very low sums, which required him to paint quickly and constantly. Thanks to an unusually profitable sale, he was able to become engaged to his landlady's daughter, Františka; a seamstress. He also made a working visit to Rügen, on the Baltic, but it had to be cut short; due to what he called "homesickness".

At the age of twenty-eight, he was diagnosed with tuberculosis. A painting by Josef Mánes (Švadlenka) shows Františka when she learned of his illness, while sewing her wedding dress. They chose to marry, anyway, and he died on 29 October 1859 in Prague, shortly after the birth of their daughter. . His friends and colleagues provided what assistance they could, but their plans for a large exhibition were never realized.

== Selected paintings ==
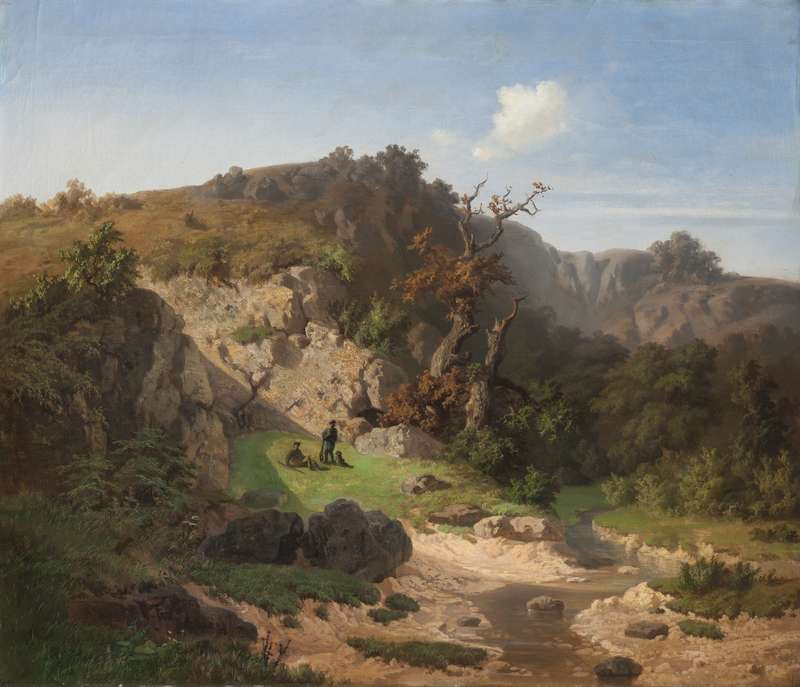
Countryside with Hunters

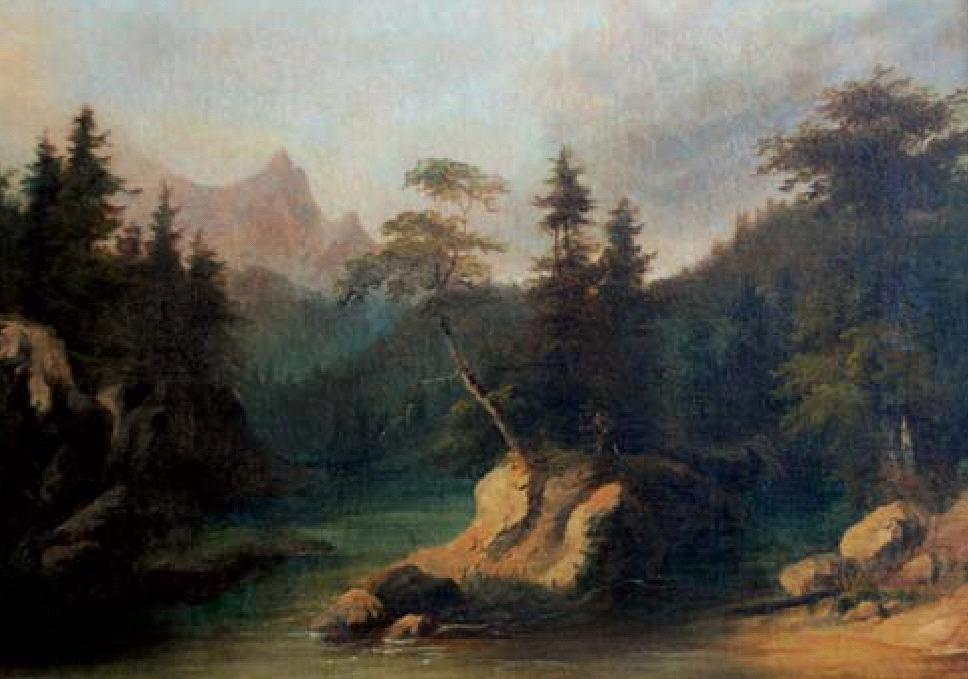
Mountain Scenery

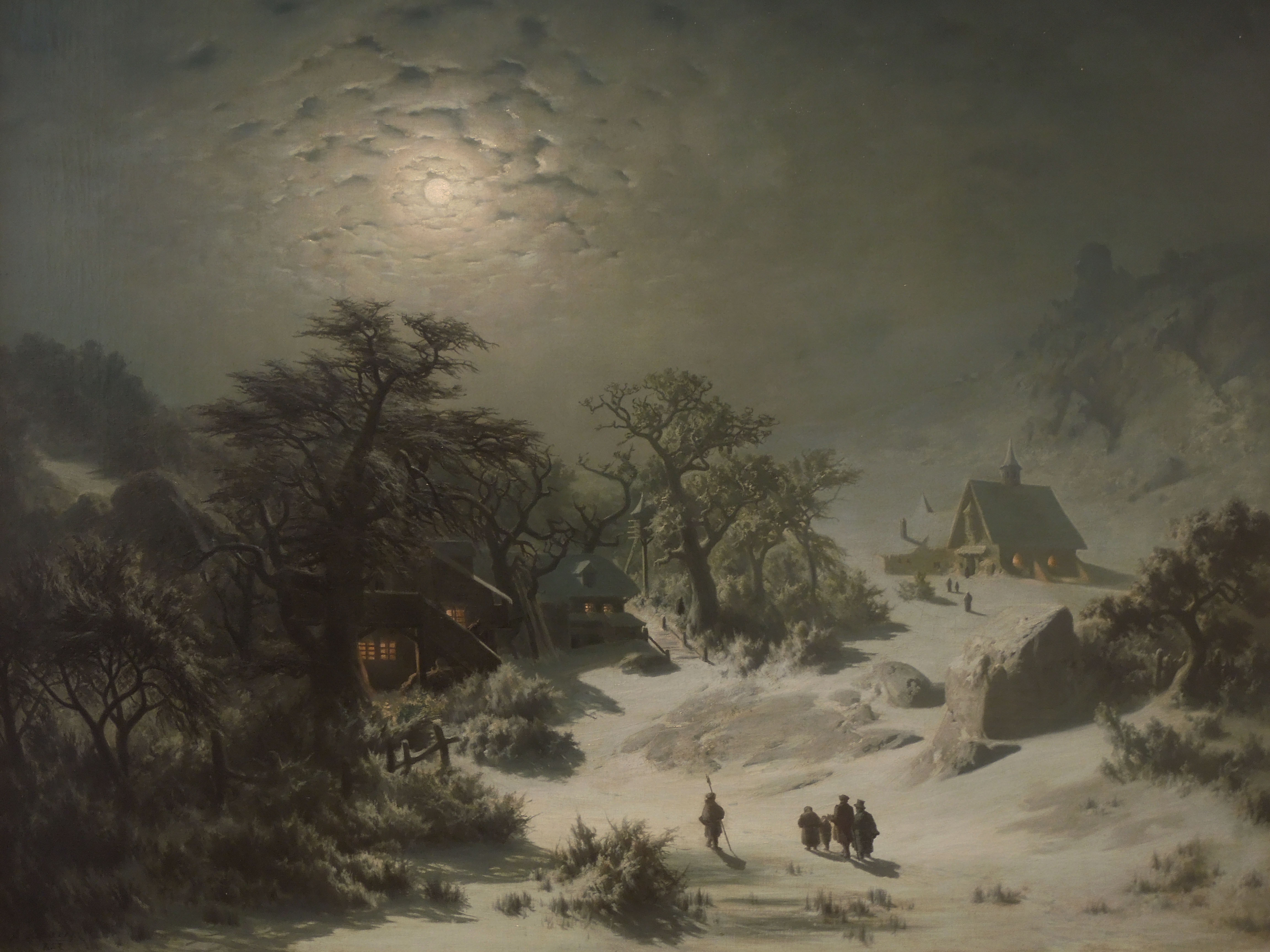
Winter Night

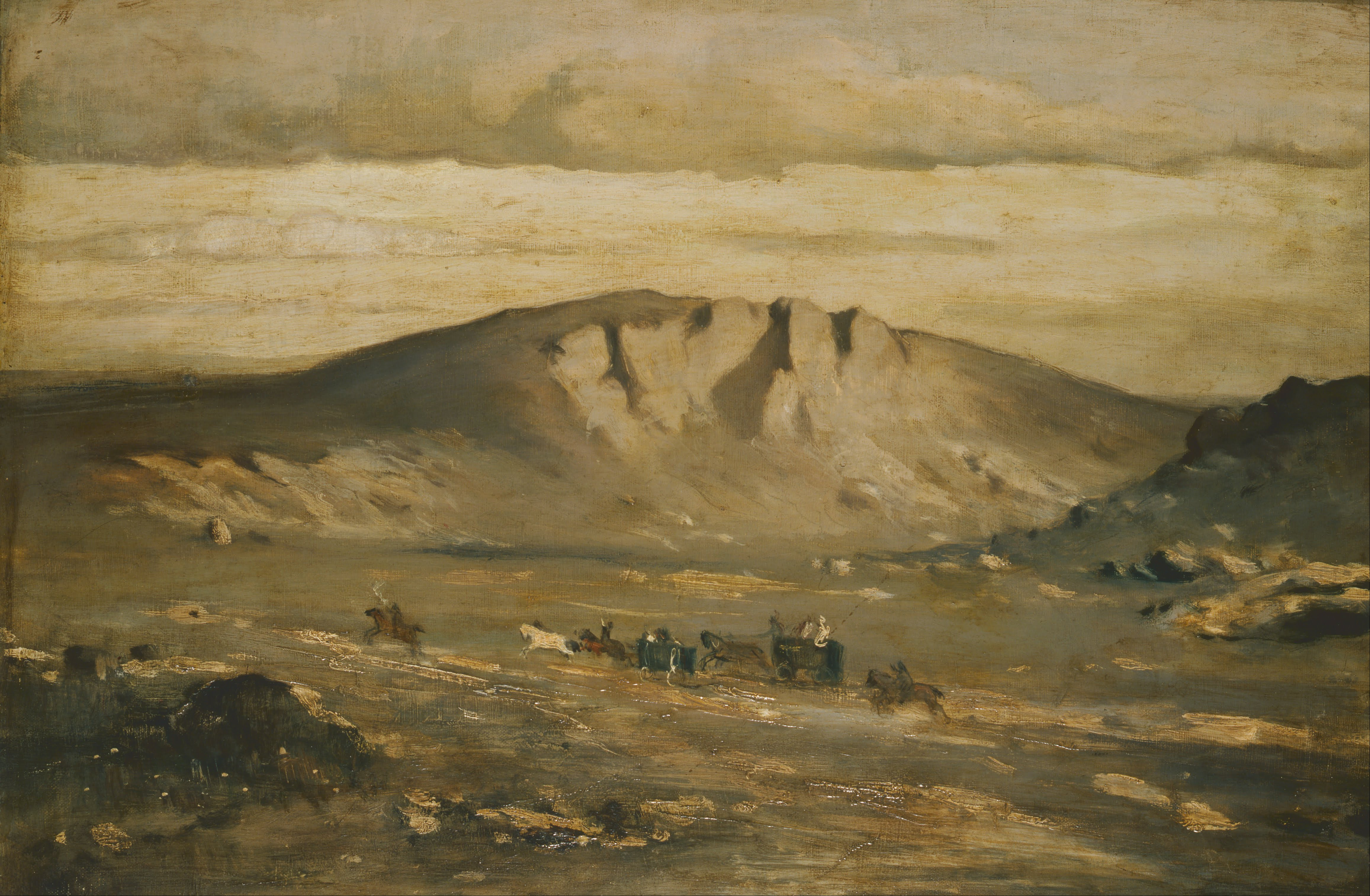
Lonely Landscape
