= Leopold Rottmann =

German landscape painter

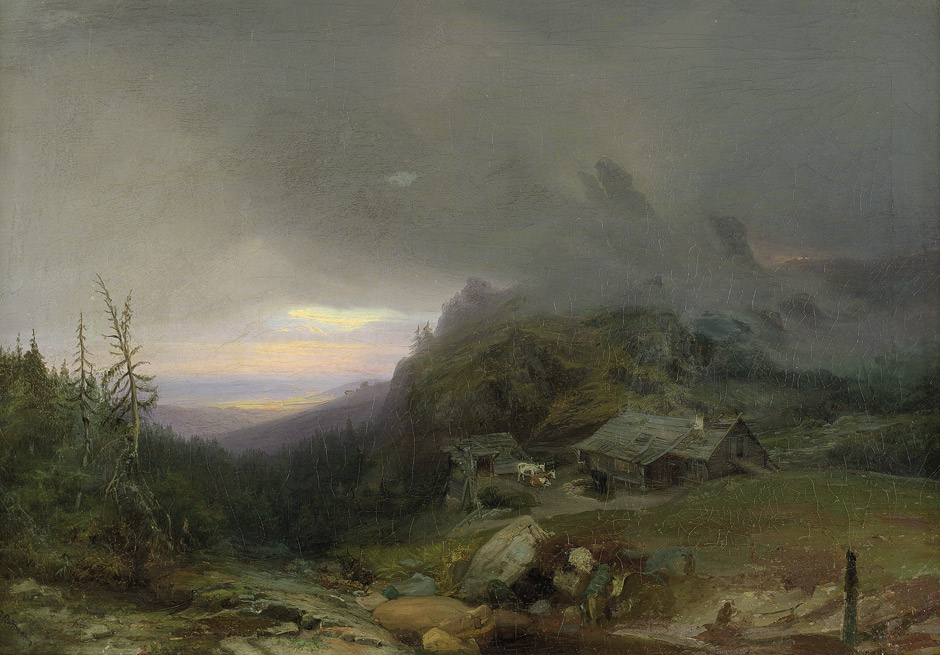
Alm in the Mountains During a Thunderstorm

Leopold Rottmann (2 October 1812, Heidelberg - 26 March 1881, Munich) was a German landscape painter.

== Biography ==
His father, Friedrich Rottmann, was a painter and a Professor of Drawing, who gave him his first lessons. He continued his studies with Jakob Wilhelm Roux and completed them with his older brother, Carl Rottmann. In 1803, he briefly attended the Academy of Fine Arts, Munich, and became a lecturer on lithography there in 1840.

He became the drawing teacher for Crown Prince Ludwig (later King Ludwig II of Bavaria). In 1861, the Crown Prince commissioned him to design costumes and scenery for a production of Lohengrin by Richard Wagner, the Prince's favorite composer. His cousin, Princess Therese of Bavaria, also received lessons from Rottmann. Julius Mařák, a landscape painter and, later, Professor at the Academy of Fine Arts, Prague, was one of his better known non-royal students.

As a landscape painter, he was especially well known for his watercolors. Although he was primarily a Naturalist, his style also shows the influence of Classically trained painters, such as Joseph Anton Koch and Friedrich Preller the Elder.

He was buried at the Alter Südfriedhof in Munich.

== Sources ==
- Hyacinth Holland (1889). "Rottmann, Leopold" . Allgemeine Deutsche Biographie (in German). Vol. 29. Leipzig: Duncker & Humblot. pp. 399–401.
- Richard Graul: Einführung in die Kunstgeschichte., Verlag von Klinkhardt & Biermann, Leipzig, revised ed. 1923
- Rupert Hacker (Ed.): Ludwig II. König von Bayern in Augenzeugenberichten., DTV Deutscher Taschenbuch, reprint 1986 ISBN 978-3-423-02703-8
- Hadumod Bußmann: Prinzessin Therese von Bayern., Allitera Verlag, reprint 2015, ISBN 978-3-86906-747-6
