= Family Brewery Bernard =

Brewery in Humpolec, Czech Republic

Bernard Brewery
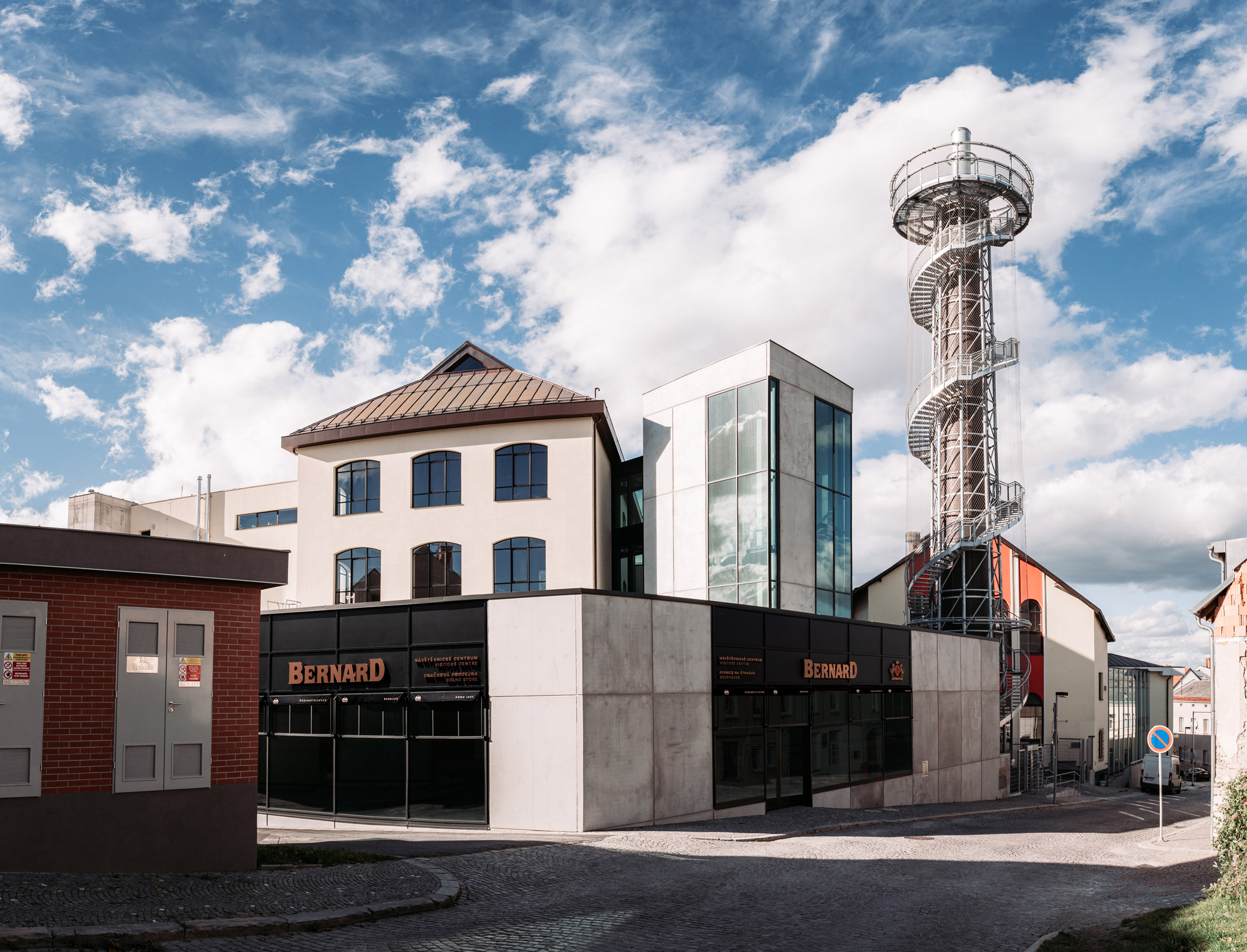
- Bernard Brewery
- Interactive map of Bernard Brewery
- Location: 5. května 1 Humpolec; Czech Republic 396 01
- Coordinates: 49°32′24″N 15°21′35″E
- Opened: 1597
- Annual production volume: 350,000 hectolitres (300,000 US bbl)
- Owned by: Rodinný pivovar Bernard, a. s.
- Website: www.bernard.cz

Family Brewery Bernard (officially in Czech Rodinný pivovar Bernard) is a brewery in Humpolec, Czech Republic, founded in 1597. It is owned by Rodinný pivovar Bernard, a. s. (shareholders: Duvel Moortgat NV, Breendonk, Belgium 50%, Stanislav Bernard 25%, Josef Vávra 25%).

== History ==
The era of beer brewing started in Humpolec in 1597, when the brewery belonged to the owner of the Herálec estate. In the 1930s, it employed 40 people and produced 20,000 hectolitres a year. The beer was sold in the Humpolec, Německý Brod (now Havlíčkův Brod), Ledečko and Pelhřimov regions.

After World War II, the brewery was integrated into that state enterprise Horácké pivovary Jihlava, and in 1960 into Jihočeské pivovary České Budějovice. In 1989, the conglomerate Jihočeské pivovary was renamed to Pivovary České Budějovice, a state enterprise. This company's leadership didn't plan on developing the brewery further, and pressure grew to liquidate it. Up until the time of privatization, the brewery made a 10° pale beer, 11° pale Orlík beer, and briefly before 1991, a pale 12° called Zálesák (Woodsman).

=== A new era ===
On 26 October 1991, Stanislav Bernard, Josef Vávra and Rudolf Šmejkal bought the bankrupt brewery at auction for five times the initial asking price. This started a completely new era for the brewery.

In the initial years, burdened with large debt, the brewery battled for existence. Today, Bernard beer is exported to more than 20 countries; about 20% of production is destined for export. In 2000, the Bernard family brewery became a joint stock company that attracted investment by Belgian brewery Duvel Moortgat.

Medium-sized Bernard is nonetheless a part of the Czech beer market, of which its production makes up about 2%. Most of the beer (63%) is sold in barrels, and a smaller amount in bottles. This ratio is the reverse of the Czech market overall, where most beer is sold in glass bottles, cans and plastic bottles. Cautious of the environment, the brewery has never shipped beer in plastic bottles and not even in cans. The brewery is a member of Zálohujme.cz, an organization advocating use of deposit bottles.

So far, the brewery's highest output was in 2019 — 400,000 hectolitres. However, maximum production is not the goal. Since the brewery's founding, the owners have been on a constant quest to brew the very best beer. For this purpose, in 2000, the brewery bought a humno malt house in Rajhrad u Brna. Production of humno malt is labour- and cost-intensive, but malt produced in this way is the most suitable for traditional Czech beer.

=== Innovation ===
The Bernard family brewery came to the Czech market with many innovations that brought attention and distinction to the brand. For example, starting in 2002, the brewery has used patented retro bottles that drew great interest from customers and are now characteristic of the brewery. In 2007, the brewery was the first to come out with non-alcoholic semi-dark beer. In 2009, the non-alcoholic beverage Švestka was released. In addition to the brewery helping bridge the crisis years, it opened a completely new segment on the Czech market, in which many manufacturers operate today. In 2014, the brewery started brewing top-fermented Bernard Bohemian Ale.

=== COVID-19 crisis ===
From 2020 to 2022, the brewing industry was negatively affected by measures to stop the spread of COVID-19. Among other things, that meant closure or restrictions on businesses with draught beer. The Bernard Family Brewery used this time as an opportunity to introduce several new products. It offered chocolates with malt and a pinch of hops, and also introduced an excellent, strong, but delicate Bernard beer brandy. Master Jiří Syrovátka brews it for the brewery from fresh beer at the Zámecké sady Chrámce biodistillery in the České středohoří Protected Area. The beer brandy is normally available in bottles, but there are also several oak barrels of it lying in the cellar of the distillery, which will be here for an unknown time awaiting release to the market. This is the same place where Bernard whisky develops and matures. The brewery has also started offering pralines with beer brandy.

== Tourism ==
=== Visitor centre ===
In honour of its 30th anniversary, the brewery prepared to open the Bernard Visitor Centre. Due to anti-epidemic measures, the centre was opened to the public later, on 1 June 2022.

The Visitor Centre is connected directly to the brewery.

=== Lookout tower ===
Along with the centre, a lookout tower has been built around the brewery's functional chimney. From the walkway, 33 metres in the air, the brewery, the town and the surroundings can be viewed. The Orlík castle ruin and Lipnice castle are among the things to be seen.

== Gallery ==
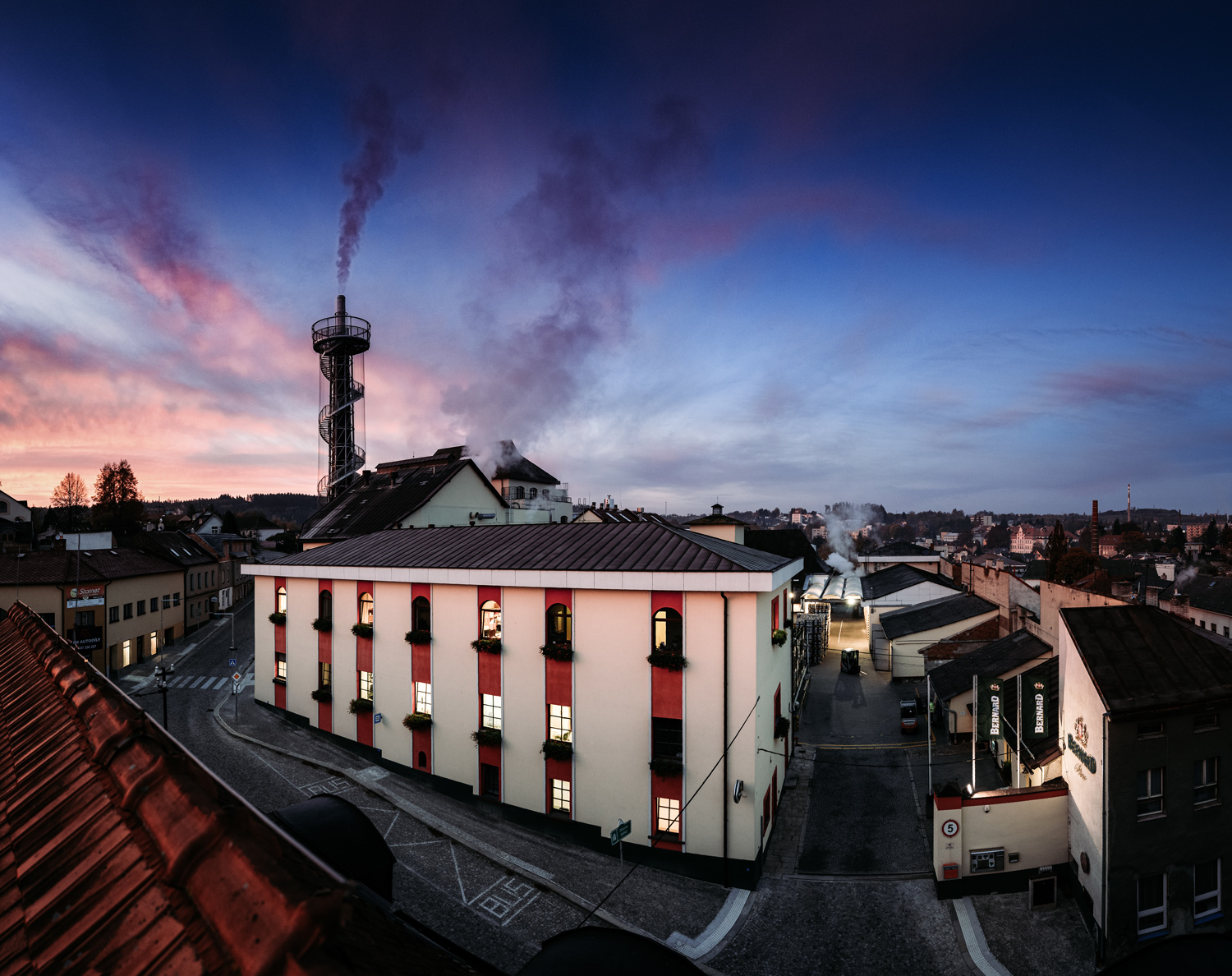
Bernard Brewery

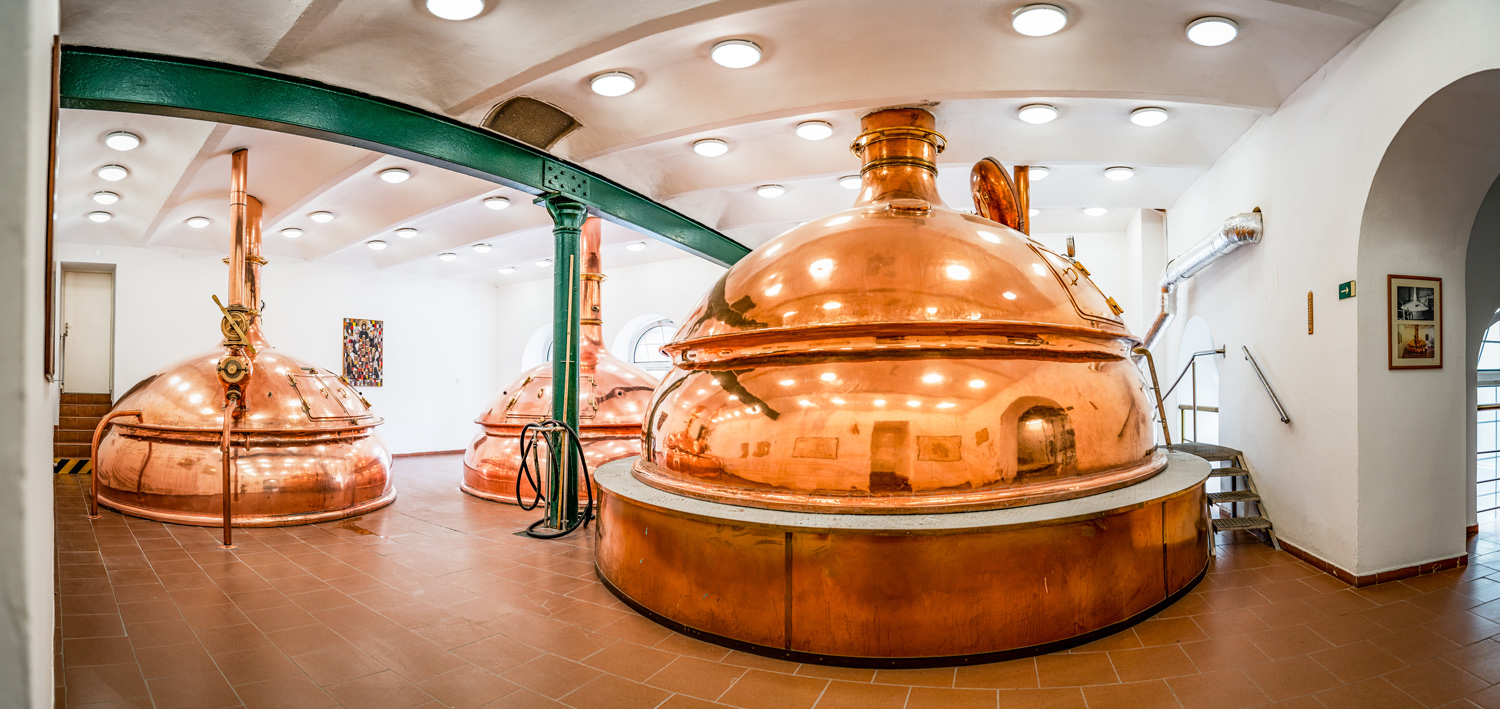
Brewhouse

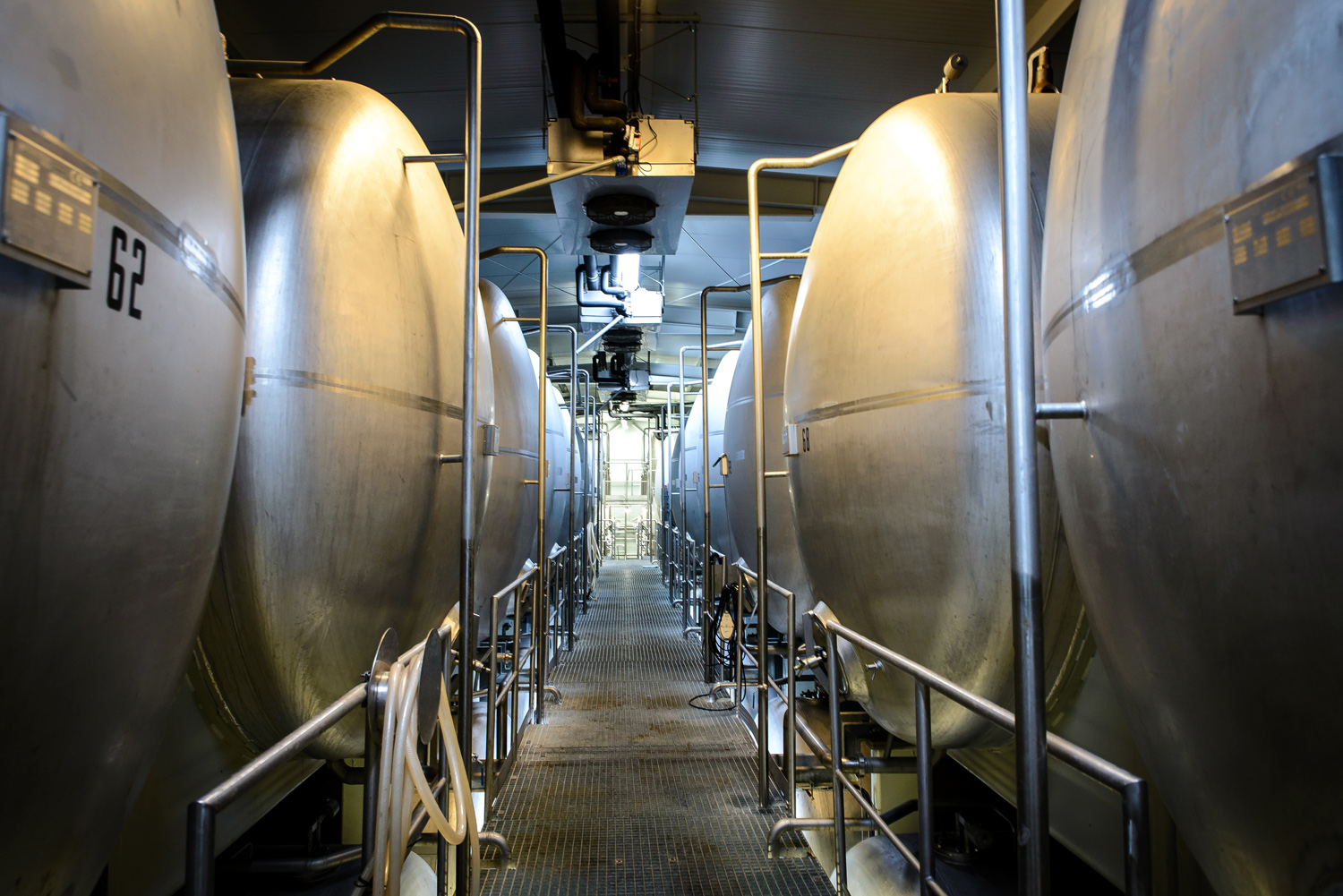
Tanks with lager

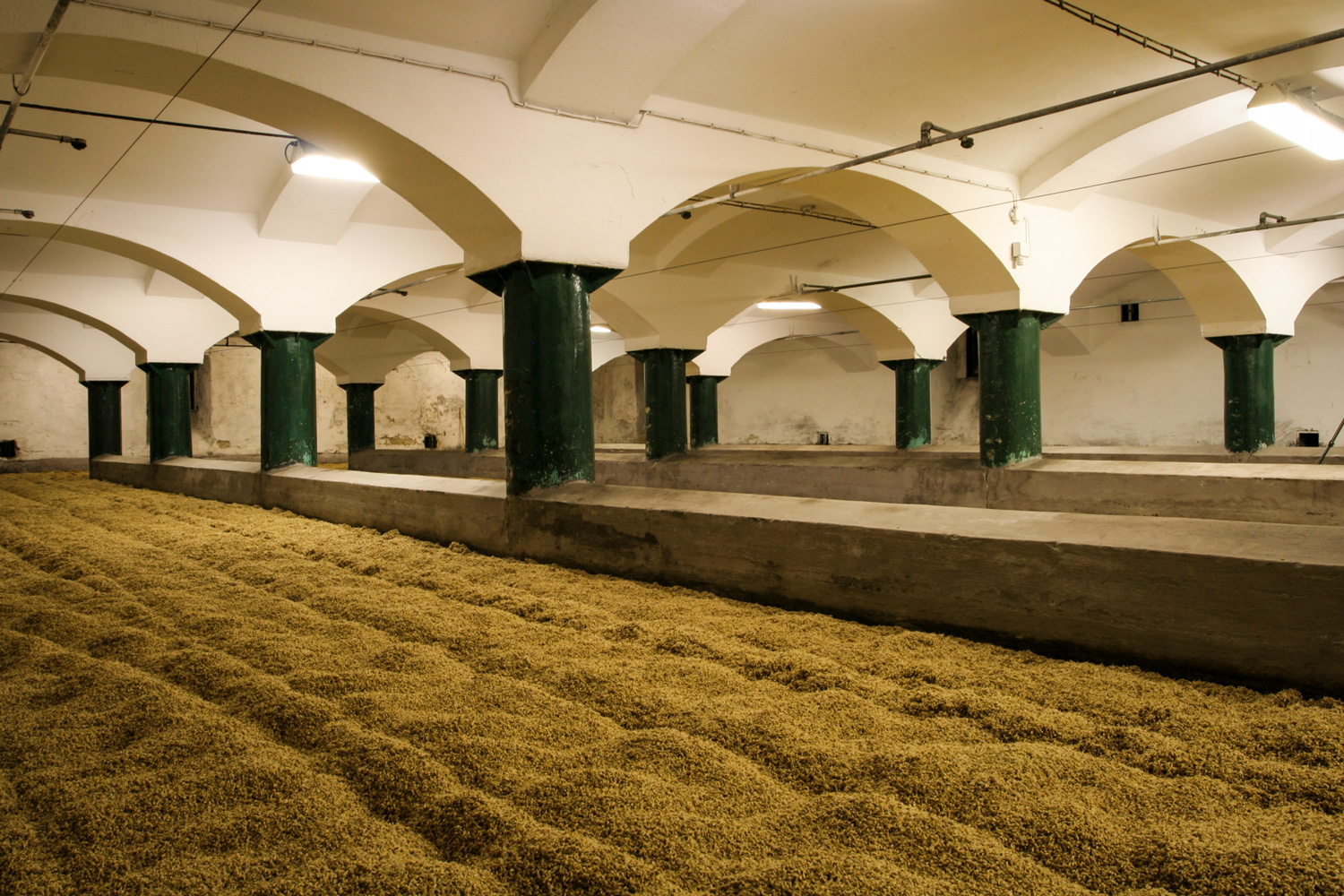
Malt House

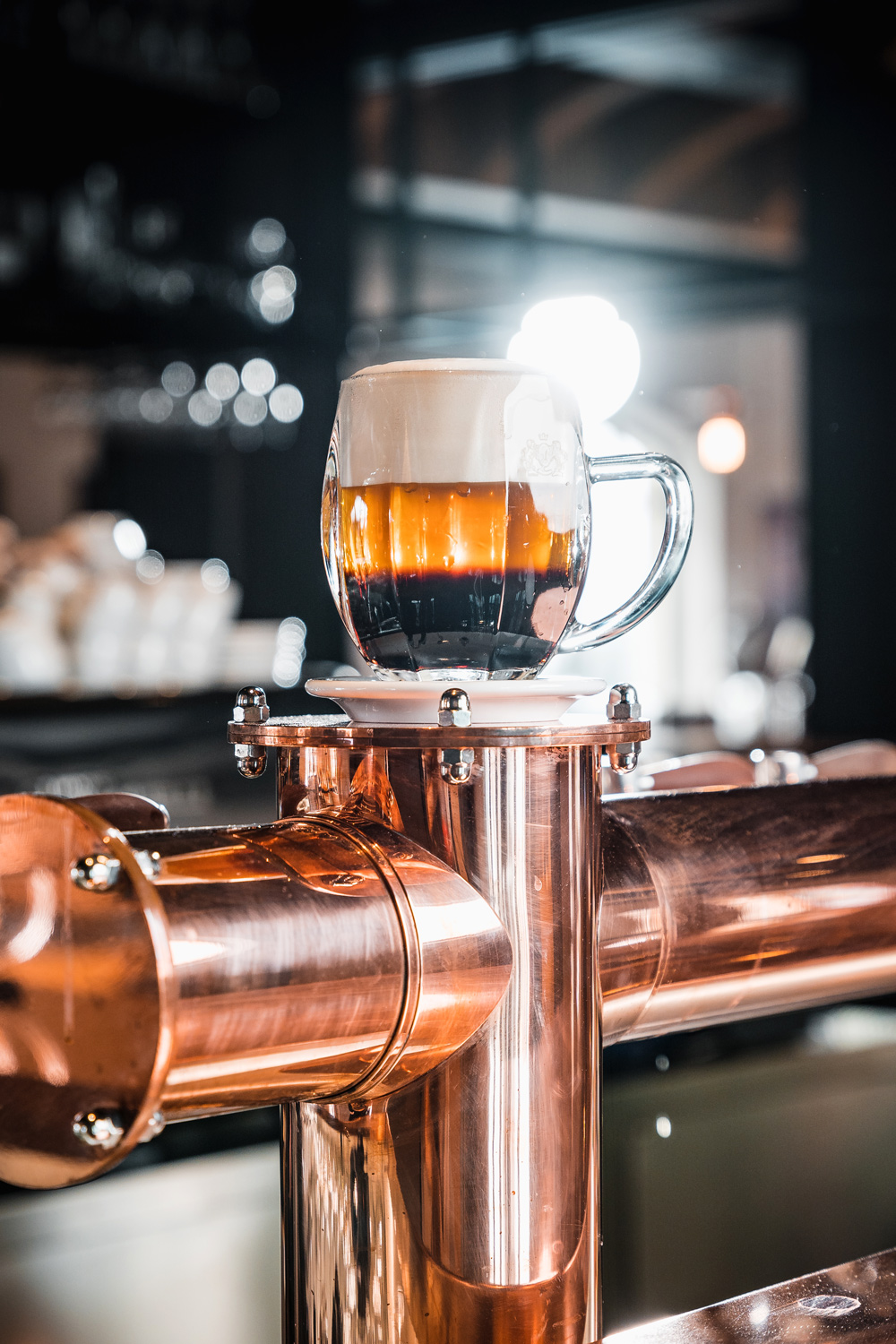

== See also ==
- Beer in the Czech Republic
