= Josefina Mařáková =

Czech painter

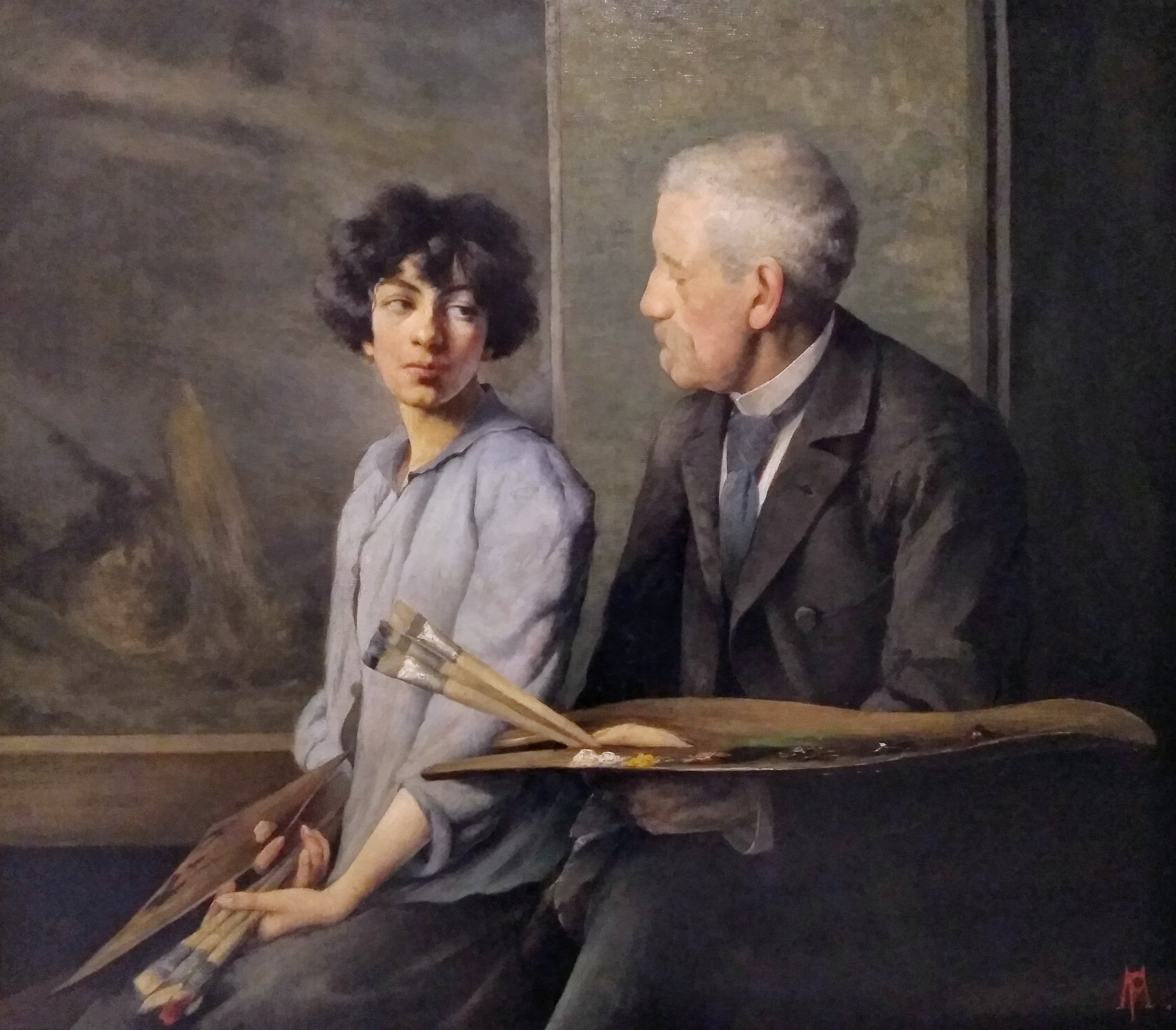
Self-portrait with her father (1896)

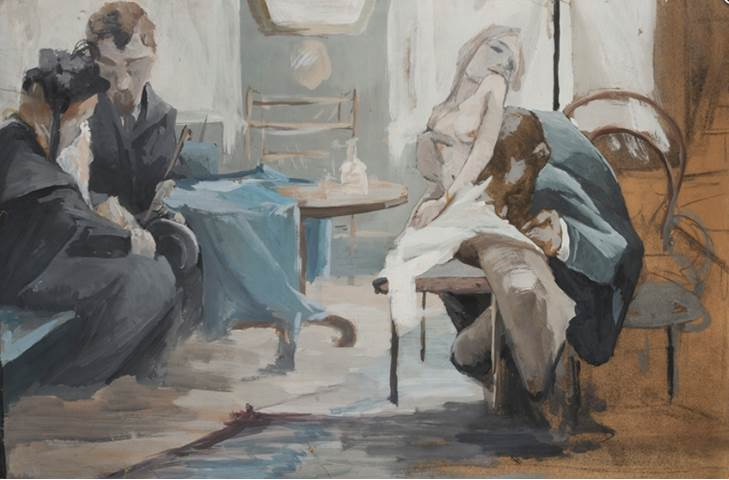
The Doctors (1900)

Josefina "Pepa" Mařáková (19 March 1872 – 19 June 1907) was a Czech painter who specialized in caricatures and figure painting.

== Biography ==
Mařáková was born on 19 March 1872 in Vienna. She was born to the Czech landscape painter, Julius Mařák, during a period when he was working in Vienna, and originally spoke only German, although she took an early interest in her Czech heritage. In addition to her father, she received lessons from František Dvořák, Maximilian Pirner and Václav Brožík.

Mařáková's first exhibition came in 1897 with the Fine Arts Union in Prague. She was, however, always in poor health and generally lived in seclusion with her mother. She also helped out in her father's studio and, after his death, briefly had one of her own. She died on 19 June 1907 in Prague.

Mařáková was mainly devoted to creating figurative works in a decadent, Symbolist style, but also produced some portraits of notable personalities, including the painter, Otakar Lebeda, the politician František Ladislav Rieger, the family of poet Adolf Heyduk and her father's patron, Josef Hlávka.

Much of Mařáková's work is in private collections, but may also be seen at the National Gallery in Prague and the municipal gallery in Litomyšl.

== Sources ==
- Veronika Hulíková, Pepa Mařák (1872?-1907), exhibition bulletin, National Gallery
- Pavel Augusta. Kdo byl kdo v našich dějinách roku 1918, Libri, 1999. ISBN 80-85983-94-X
