= Inocenc Arnošt Bláha =

Czech sociologist and philosopher (1879–1960)

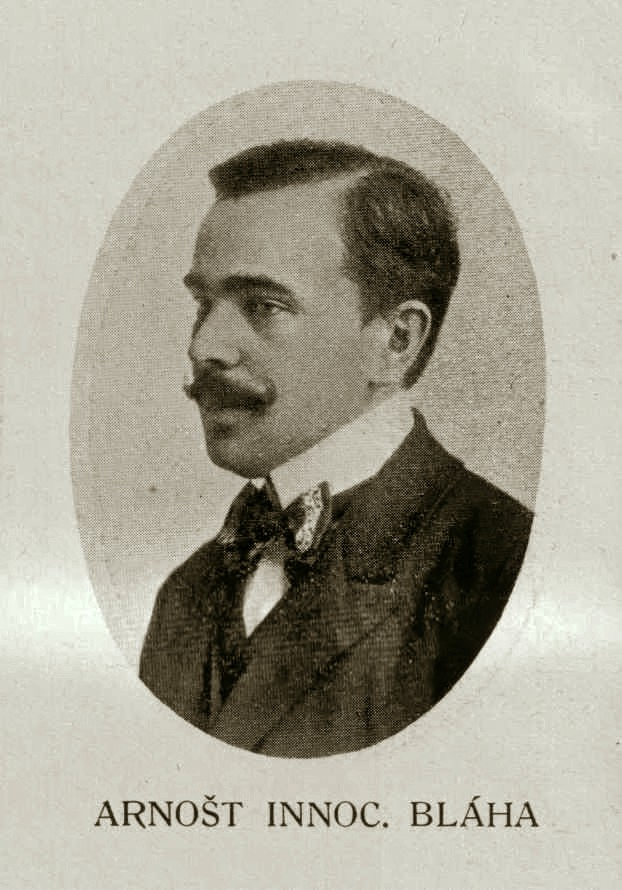
Inocenc Arnošt Bláha

Inocenc Arnošt Bláha (28 July 1879, Krasoňov – 25 April 1960, Brno) was a Czech sociologist and philosopher. From 1922 to 1950, he was the professor of sociology at the Masaryk University in Brno. Bláha was the leading figure of the Brno school of sociology and author of the theoretical concept of "federative functionalism".

== Bibliography ==
- Město: sociologická studie ("City: a sociological study"), Prague 1914.
- Filosofie mravnosti ("Philosophy of morals"), Brno: A. Píša 1922.
- Sociologie sedláka a dělníka ("Sociology of farmer and worker"), Prague: Orbis 1925, 2nd ed. 1937.
- Sociologie dětství ("A sociology of childhood"), 1927, (reed. 1930, 1946 revised, 1948).
- Sociologie intelligence ("Sociology of the Intelligentsia"), Prague: Orbis 1937.
- Sociologie ("Sociology"), ed. Juliána Obrdlíková, Prague: Academia 1968.
- Československá sociologie: od svého vzniku do roku 1948 ("The Czechoslovak sociology from its origins until 1948"), ed. V. Kadlec, Brno: Doplněk 1997.
