= Anděla Kozáková-Jírová =

Czech notary (1897–1986)

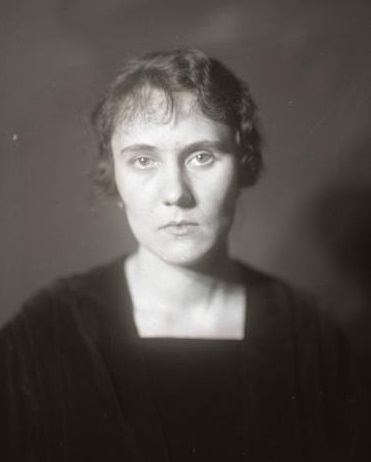
Kozáková-Jírová photographed on the day of her graduation (1922)

Anděla Kozáková-Jírová (14 May 1897 – 1 June 1986) was a Czech lawyer. She was the first woman to be awarded the university law degree in Czechoslovakia. She also became the first notary public in Europe during the protectorate. She worked for the advancement of women's rights, and advocated for higher educational opportunities for women.

== Biography ==
Anděla Kozáková-Jírová was born on 14 May 1897 in Humpolec, Austria-Hungary (now the Czech Republic). She completed her school education at a boys' gymnasium in Rokycany. She studied at the Faculty of Law of Charles University in Prague, and graduated on 19 December 1922. She became the first woman to receive a doctoral degree in law in Czechoslovakia. This had brought a new beginning for women in entering into the traditionally male-occupied legal profession.

In legal practice, she started her professional career as a clerk in the press department of the Presidency of the Council of Ministers and later at the Ministry of Social Welfare. After passing the notary exams in 1928, she became a notary substitute, later a deputy notary in 1930. In September 1938, she became the first woman in Czechoslovakia and throughout Europe to be appointed as a notary public.

In 1922 she founded the Association of university-Educated Women and served as a vice-president for ten years.

In 1943, she married lawyer Jaroslav Jíra.

She died on 1 June 1986 in Santa Barbara, California at the age of 89.
