= Herálec (Havlíčkův Brod District) =

- Municipality
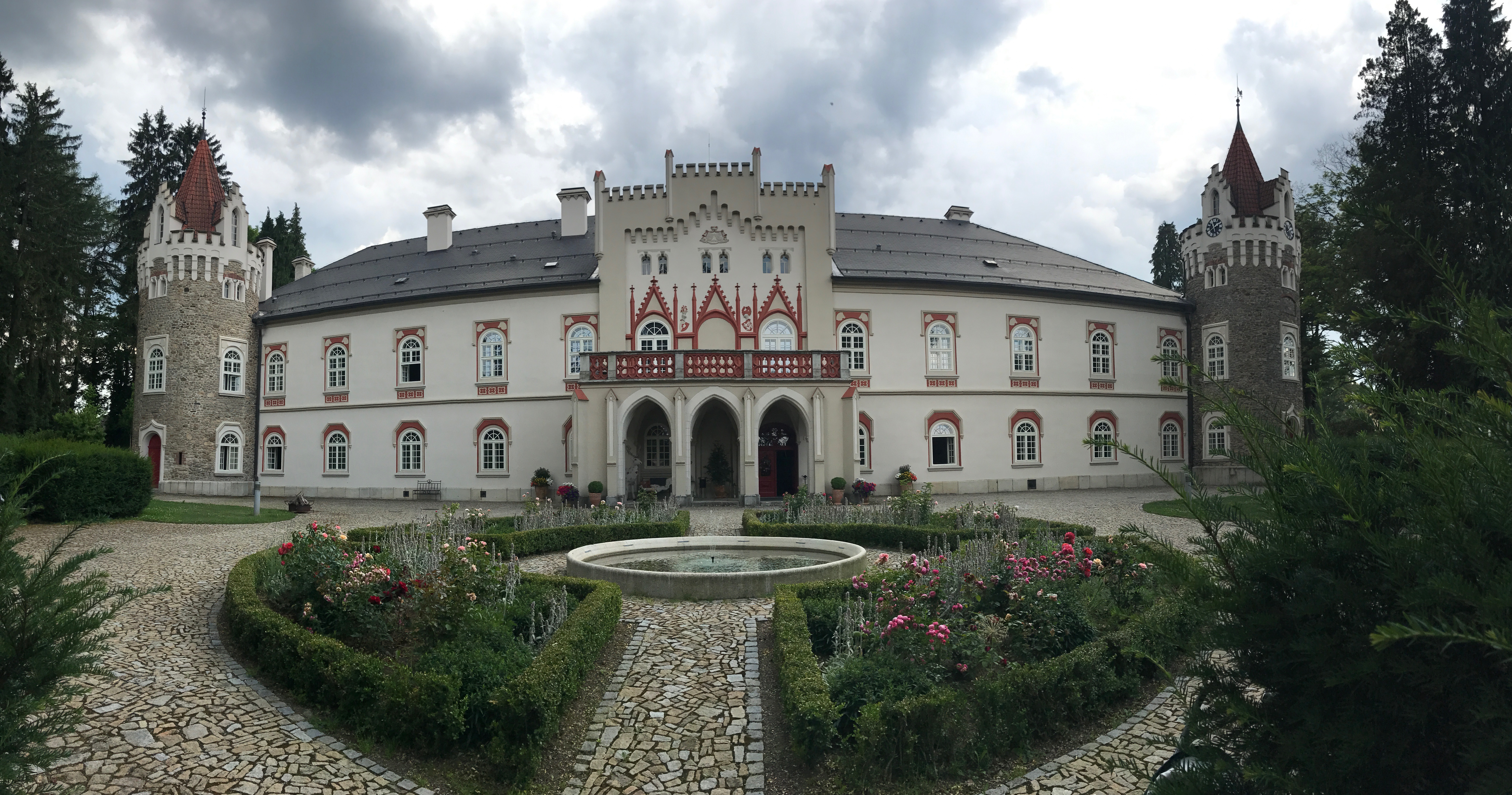
- Herálec Castle

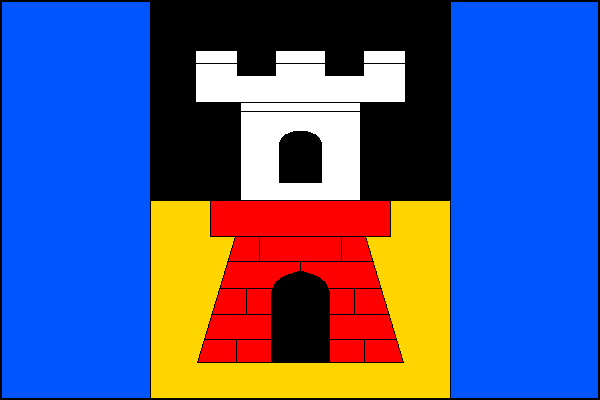
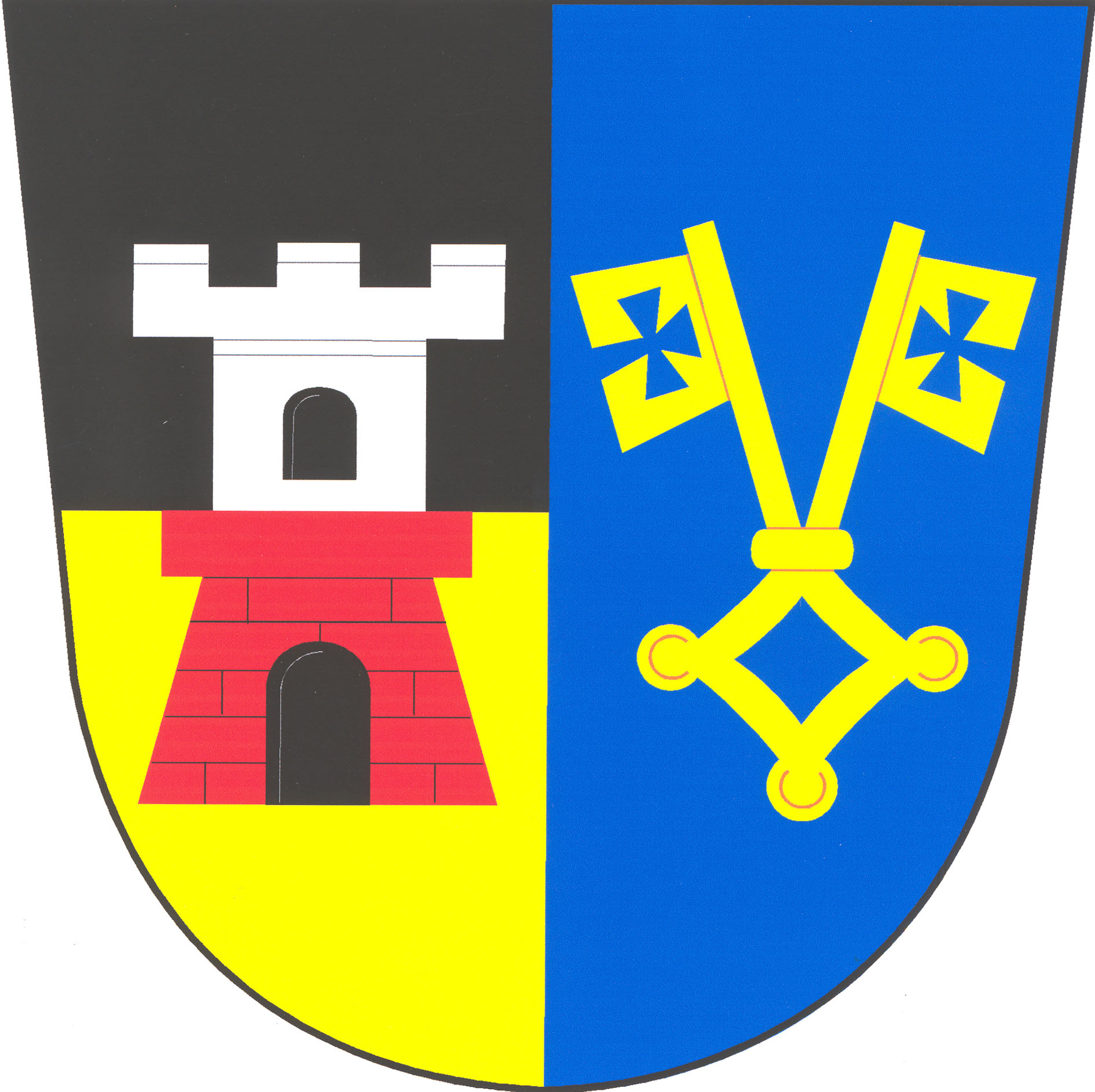
- Flag Coat of arms

- Location in the Czech Republic
- Coordinates: 49°31′51″N 15°27′26″E
- Country: Czech Republic
- Region: Vysočina
- District: Havlíčkův Brod
- First mentioned: 1280

Area
  - Total: 28.67 km^{2} (11.07 sq mi)
- Elevation: 566 m (1,857 ft)

Population (2026-01-01)
  - Total: 1,158
  - Density: 40.39/km^{2} (104.6/sq mi)
- Time zone: UTC+1 (CET)
  - Summer (DST): UTC+2 (CEST)
- Postal code: 582 55
- Website: www.heralec.cz

Herálec is a municipality and village in Havlíčkův Brod District in the Vysočina Region of the Czech Republic. It has about 1,200 inhabitants.

== Administrative division ==
Herálec consists of seven municipal parts (in brackets population according to the 2021 census):

- Herálec (646)
- Dubí (68)
- Kamenice (133)
- Koječín (66)
- Mikulášov (21)
- Pavlov u Herálce (81)
- Zdislavice (64)

== Etymology ==
The name Herálec is derived from the personal name Herhart. The village was initially name Herharc, meaning "Herhart's (court)".

== Geography ==
Herálec is located about 12 kilometres (7 mi) southwest of Havlíčkův Brod and 17 km (11 mi) northwest of Jihlava. It lies in the Křemešník Highlands. The highest point is at 653 m (2,142 ft) above sea level. The territory is rich in small fishponds.

== History ==
The first written mention of Herálec is from 1280.

== Demographics ==
Historical population

Year	Pop.	±%
1869	2,321	—
1880	2,343	+0.9%
1890	2,285	−2.5%
1900	2,316	+1.4%
1910	2,247	−3.0%

Year	Pop.	±%
1921	2,228	−0.8%
1930	2,166	−2.8%
1950	1,796	−17.1%
1961	1,805	+0.5%
1970	1,535	−15.0%

Year	Pop.	±%
1980	1,291	−15.9%
1991	1,130	−12.5%
2001	1,100	−2.7%
2011	1,162	+5.6%
2021	1,079	−7.1%

Source: Censuses

== Transport ==
The D1 motorway from Prague to Brno runs through the municipal territory.

Herálec is located on the railway line Havlíčkův Brod–Humpolec.

== Sights ==
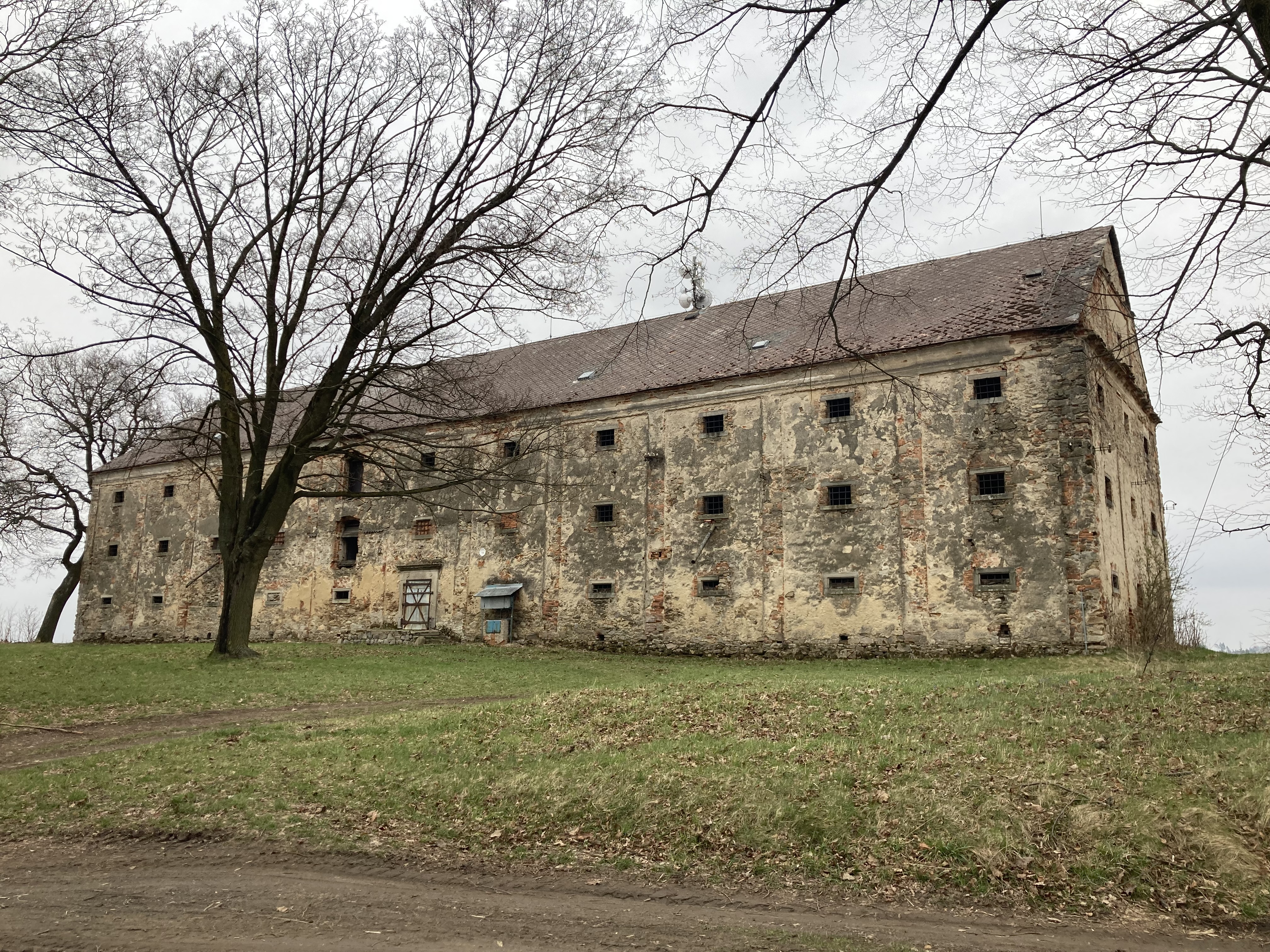
Baroque granary

The most important monument is the Herálec Castle. The originally Renaissance castle was built in 1601 on the site of an old medieval fortress. It was modified several times. Today it serves as a hotel. The castle is surrounded by an English park.

Among the main landmarks of Herálec is the Church of Saint Bartholomew. It is a pseudo-Gothic church without historical value.

In Herálec is a valuable cemetery, which includes six tombstones from the times of the Napoleonic Wars.

A notable technical monument is the Baroque granary, which dates from 1726. Today the building is unused and dilapidated.

== Notable people ==
- Adolf Kosárek (1830–1859), landscape painter
- Jan Zábrana (1931–1984), writer and translator
