= Anna Sychravová =

Czechoslovak educator and politician (1873–1925)

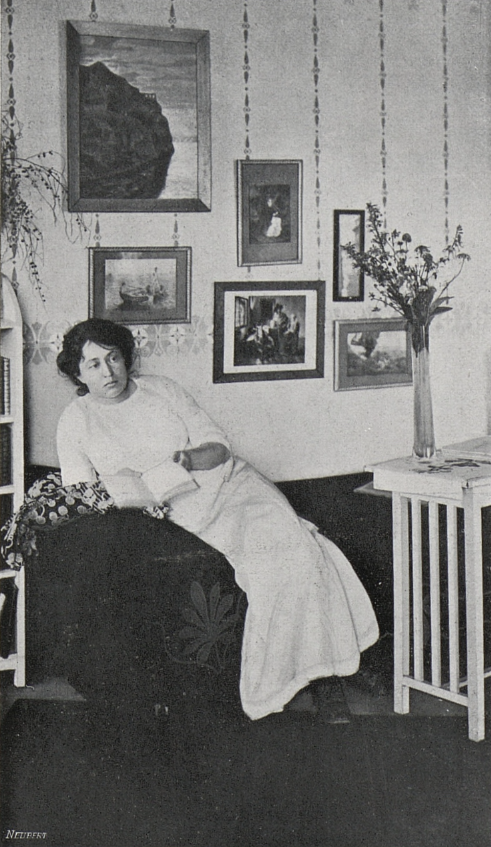
- Sychravová in 1913

Member of the Chamber of Deputies
- In office 1920–1925
- Succeeded by: Jozef Pajger
- Constituency: XVII

Personal details
- Born: 7 July 1873 Humpolec, Austria-Hungary
- Died: 22 February 1925 (aged 51) Prague, Czechoslovakia

Anna Sychravová (7 July 1873 – 22 February 1925) was a Czechoslovak educator and politician. In 1920, she was elected to the Chamber of Deputies, becoming one of the first group of female members, and the only one elected from Slovakia.

== Biography ==
Sychravová was born to a clerical family in Humpolec in Bohemia, Austria-Hungary (now in the Czech Republic) in 1873. She became a teacher, working in Prague and Žižkov, where she also worked for the youth services of the provincial and district authorities. Following the independence of Czechoslovakia after World War I, she worked at the Ministry of Social Welfare for a year before moving to Vrútky, where she returned to teaching.

She was a candidate of the Czechoslovak Social Democratic Workers' Party in the 1920 parliamentary elections, and was elected to the Chamber of Deputies. During her term she sat on the Cultural Committee. However, she died in February 1925 in Prague-Vinohrady hospital before her term in office was complete. Her seat was taken by Jozef Pajger.
