= Dusan Kadlec =

Czech-Canadian painter (1942–2018)

Dušan Kadlec (December 21, 1942 – September 12, 2018) was a Czech-Canadian painter, born in Humpolec, Czechoslovakia (now Czech Republic). He pursued his interest in art from a very early age, ultimately studying at the Academy of Fine Arts in Prague where he received a master's degree in 1967. His studies there covered twenty-two subjects, including bookbinding, papermaking, drawing, painting, portraiture, as well as the more conventional subjects of history, political economics, languages, and math. His undergraduate and graduate training focused on traditional painting techniques but also explored aspects of sculpture, jewellery design, art restoration, and architecture. While a student at the academy, he specialized in figurative painting and portraiture.

Upon graduation Kadlec began to exhibit and receive both private and state commissions. After completing his Masters, he was fortunate to be able to make a living as an artist in his homeland. Most of his early works were commercial art projects but he also contributed to a number of exhibitions, and was invited to participate in the design of Man and His World, the Czech pavilion at the 1967 World Expo in Montreal.

Like many other artists of his generation, Kadlec has been criticized by some in the arts community for marketing signed reproductions of his work; his critics asserting that these reproductions are little more than expensive posters with limited intrinsic value compared to original works of art. These reproductions are sold through print galleries internationally as well as numerous websites online.

His work is also included in the Burrichter/Kierlin Marine Art Collection (currently on loan to the Minnesota Marine Art Museum), which is considered one of America's largest and finest privately owned marine art collections.

In 2008, Kadlec received the Rudolph J. Schaefer Maritime Heritage Award from Mystic Seaport Museum. An honour given to the artist whose work best documents and preserves America's maritime heritage.
