= Julius Mařák =

Czech painter (1832–1899)

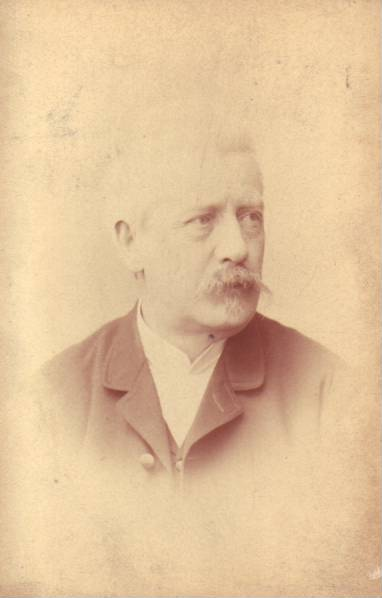
Julius Mařák (c. 1885)

Julius Eduard Mařák (29 March 1832 – 8 October 1899) was a Czech landscape painter and graphic designer.

== Biography ==
Mařák was born on 29 March 1832 in Litomyšl. His father was an auditor and land registrar. His first painting lessons came while he was still in the gymnasium, although he had difficulty deciding between an artistic or a musical career, because several family members were singers and musicians. From 1852 to 1853, he studied at the Academy of Fine Arts, Prague, under Max Haushofer, then attended the Academy of Fine Arts, Munich, where his instructors were Leopold Rottmann and Eduard Schleich.

From 1855 to 1858, he wandered throughout Bohemia, seeking inspiration, then settled in Vienna. While there, he learned etching, gave drawing lessons, and provided illustrations for several local magazines. Influences from the Barbizon school began to appear in his work, although he had never been to France. He later made a tour of the Balkans and the Tyrol.

He returned to Prague in 1887 when Josef Hlávka offered him a professorial post for landscape painting at the academy. Among his students there were Otakar Lebeda, Antonín Slavíček, František Kaván and Alois Kalvoda, who formed what became known as the Mařákova krajinářská škola (Mařák Landscape School). In 1893, he became seriously ill and had to rely on the help of his students to complete his commissions. He died on 8 October 1899 in Prague.

Among his major commissions were decorations for the new National Theatre in Prague and paintings for the staircase of the National Museum. He also created a group of sketches, for Goupil & Cie publishing, depicting the four seasons and the four times of day. They were made into a series of popular engravings by Eduard Willmann (1820–1877) of Karlsruhe.

His daughter, Josefina, also became a painter, but died premature.

== Selected paintings ==
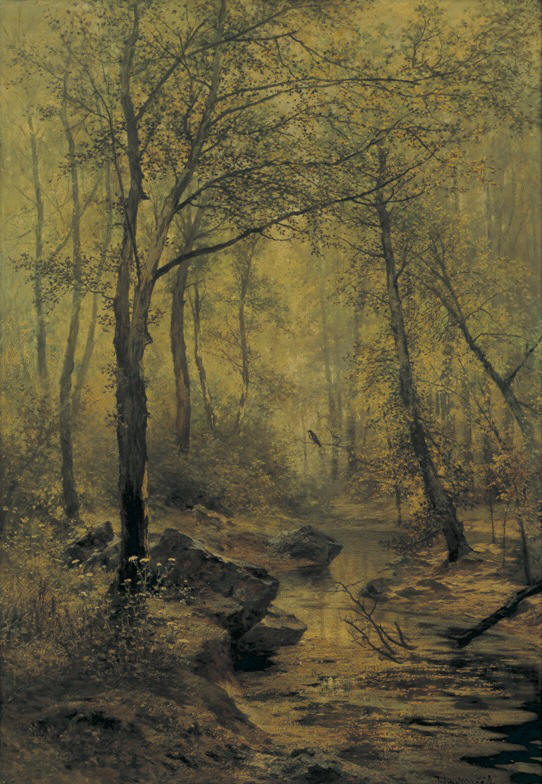
Morning Song (1877)

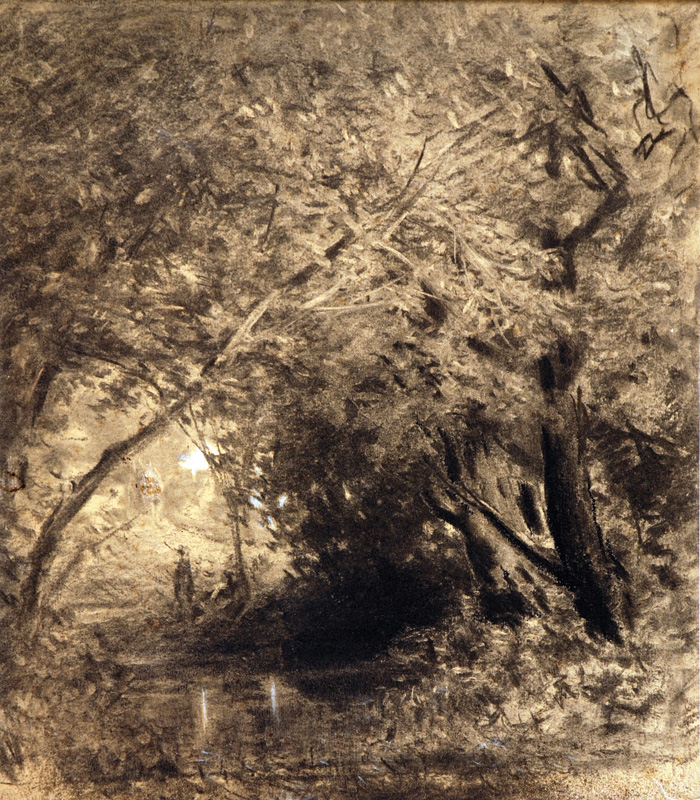
Forest Still Life (c. 1865)

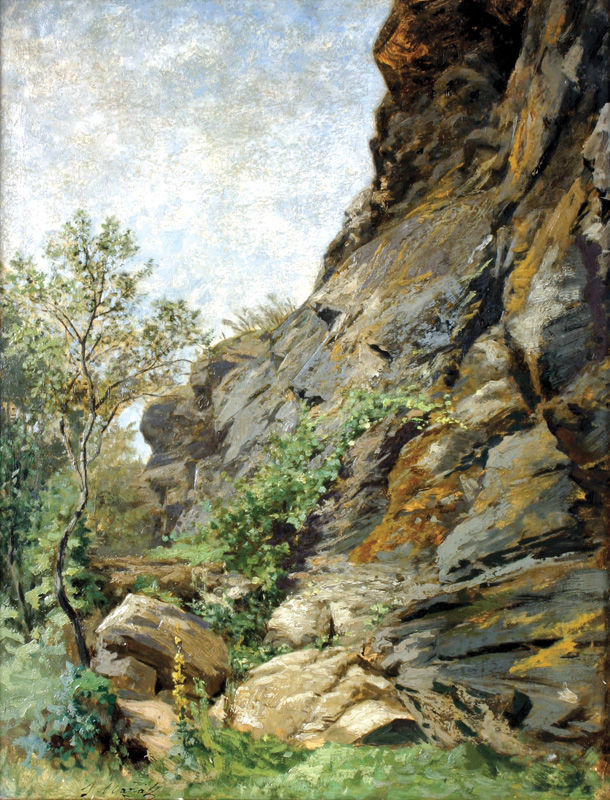
Rocks

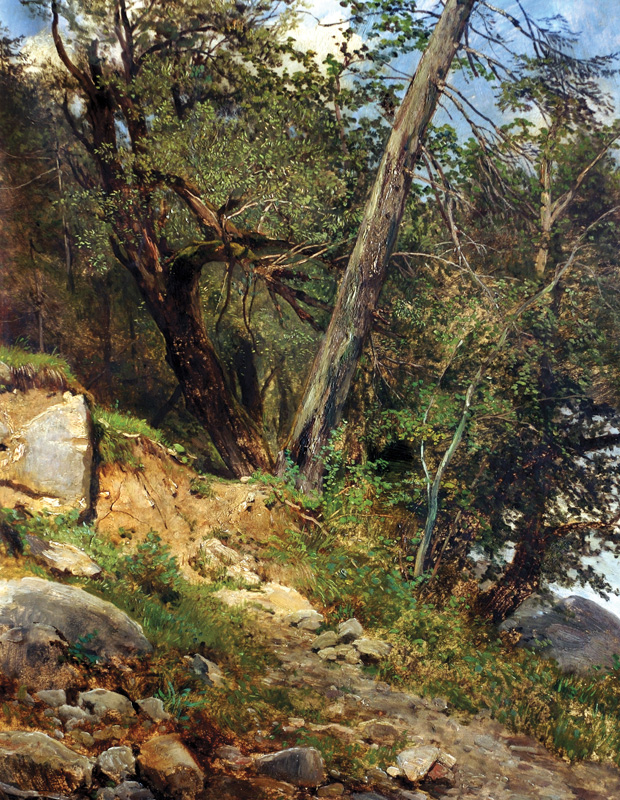
On the Edge
of the Forest

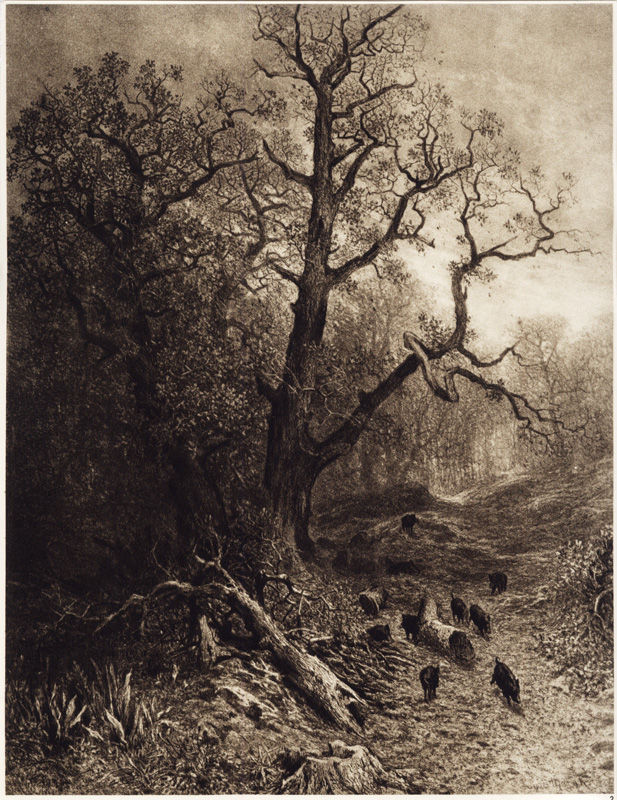
Forest
