= Jan Zábrana =

Jan Zábrana (4 July 1931 in Herálec – 3 September 1984 in Prague) was a Czech writer and translator.

His parents were teachers and politicians persecuted by the communist regime after the communist revolution of 1948: his mother, a member of the regional parliament, was arrested and sentenced to 18 years in prison; his father, mayor of Humpolec before the communist coup, was also sentenced to 10 years in prison. All property of the Zábrana family was confiscated when Zábrana was nineteen. University studies were prohibited to non-communists, so he tried to study in a Catholic school for priests, but this was prohibited, also.

From 1952 to 1953, Zábrana worked in the Tatra Smíchov tram factory in Prague, and the following year in an enamel factory in Radotín, and wrote poems and short stories (published after the fall of the communist regime in 1989 in the book Sedm povídek). At this time he met many writers, both his elders (Vladimír Holan, Jiří Kolář) and his peers Václav Havel, Josef Škvorecký, Bohumil Hrabal). From 1954, he worked full-time as a translator and became one of the best Czech translators of 20th century. His interest focused mainly on Russian and American literature, including Aksjonov, Ivan Bunin, Cvetajeva, Mandelstam, Pasternak, Babel, and Platonov; and Allen Ginsberg, Graham Greene, Sylvia Plath, Wallace Stevens, Ferlinghetti, Ezra Pound, and Gregory Corso.

Zábrana also wrote many afterwords to his translations and these were published in Potkat básníka in 1989. Apart from three years during the 1960s when he published three collections (Utkvělé černé ikony 1965, Lynč 1968 and Stránky z deníku 1968), he published no original poetry in his lifetime. He wrote three detective stories (with Josef Škvorecký), and one novel for children. In the normalization period of the 1970s, later in the 1980s, he wrote poetry and continued with his diaries, published in 1992 under the title Celý život (A Whole Life).

== Translations ==
(English)

- Jan Zábrana, "The Lesser Histories", trans. Justin Quinn, Karolinum Press (2022). ISBN 978-80-246-4933-7.
- Jan Zábrana, "Evening Trains", trans. Justin Quinn, New York Review of Books (2020).
- Jan Zábrana, "Two Poems" trans. Justin Quinn, Body (2014).
