= Carl Friedrich Heinzmann =

German painter and lithographer

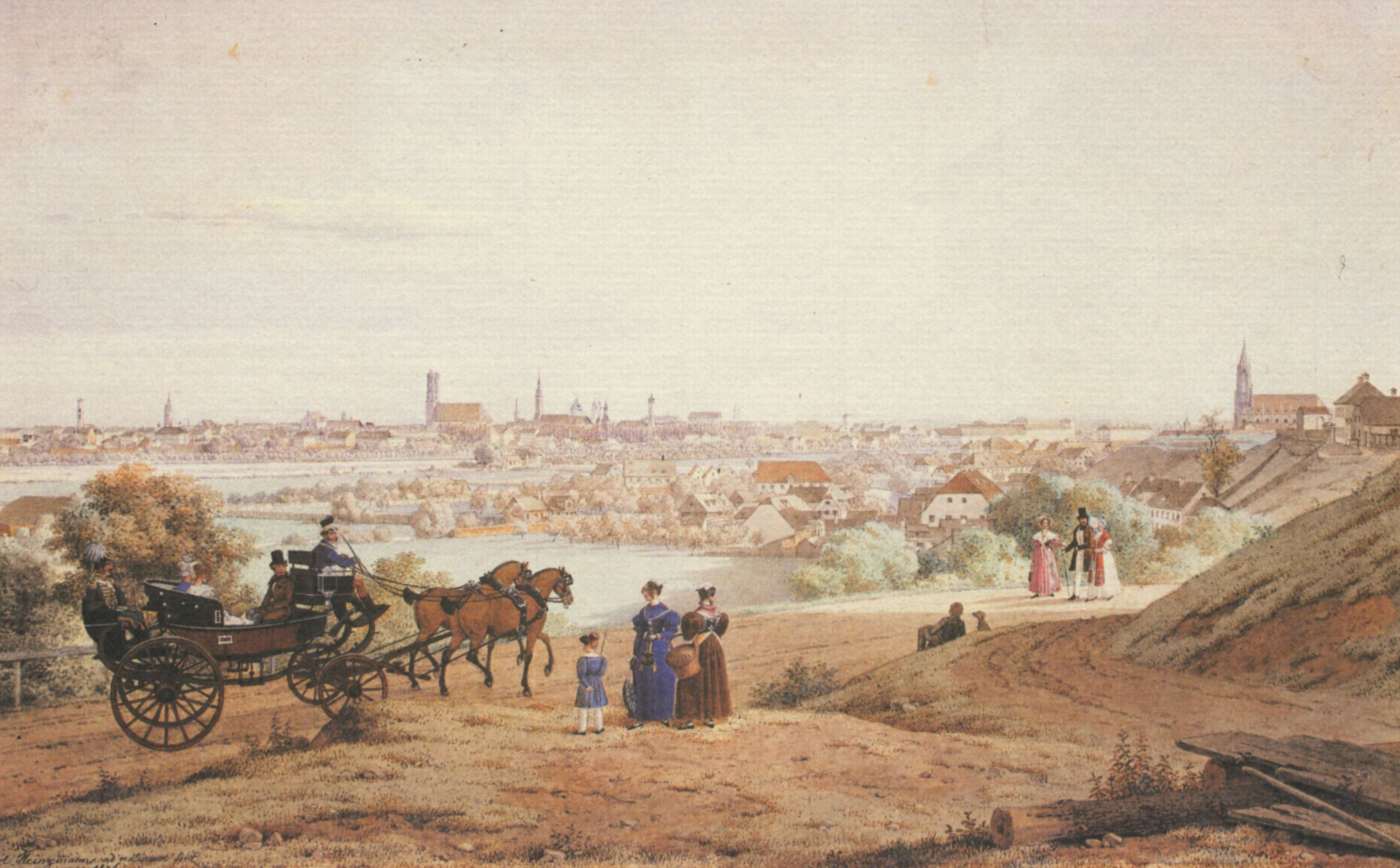
View of Munich, from Bogenhausen (watercolor)

Carl Friedrich Heinzmann (2 December 1795, Stuttgart - 9 July 1846, Munich) was a German landscape and porcelain painter; also known as a lithographer.

== Life and work ==
He received his initial art lessons from the court painter, Johann Baptist Seele. In 1814, he volunteered for military service. A year later, despite having been offered a promotion to officer in the French army, he decided to go to Munich to continue his studies, with the support of King Frederick I. There, he worked with the landscape painter, Wilhelm von Kobell. His skills became so evident that, in 1822, he was able to find employment at the Nymphenburg Porcelain Manufactory, where his preferred decorations were happy and peaceful nature scenes.

He spent as much time as possible in the Bavarian, Swiss and Tyrolean Alps, gathering material for his paintings. In addition to his original compositions, he made copies of masterworks from the Alte Pinakothek, on plates and vases. His major works include a vase, decorated with images of the various units of the Bavarian Army; which was a gift from Crown Prince Maximilian to Sultan Mahmud II, and a plaque with views of Munich, given to King Otto of Greece when he left Bavaria. He also made lithographs and numerous landscape oil paintings, many with military staffage.

In 1843, he paid an extended visit to Italy, collecting material and making sketches. Most of these were never made into completed works, as he died of pneumonia, shortly after returning to Munich in 1846.

== Sources ==
- Georg Kaspar Nagler: Neues allgemeines Künstler-Lexicon, Vol. 6, 1838, pg.68
- Atanazy Raczyński: Geschichte der neueren Kunst, Vol.2, 1840, pg.457
- Hyacinth Holland (1880). "Heinzmann, Karl Friedrich" . Allgemeine Deutsche Biographie (in German). Vol. 11. Leipzig: Duncker & Humblot. pp. 664–665.
