= Važec =

- Municipality
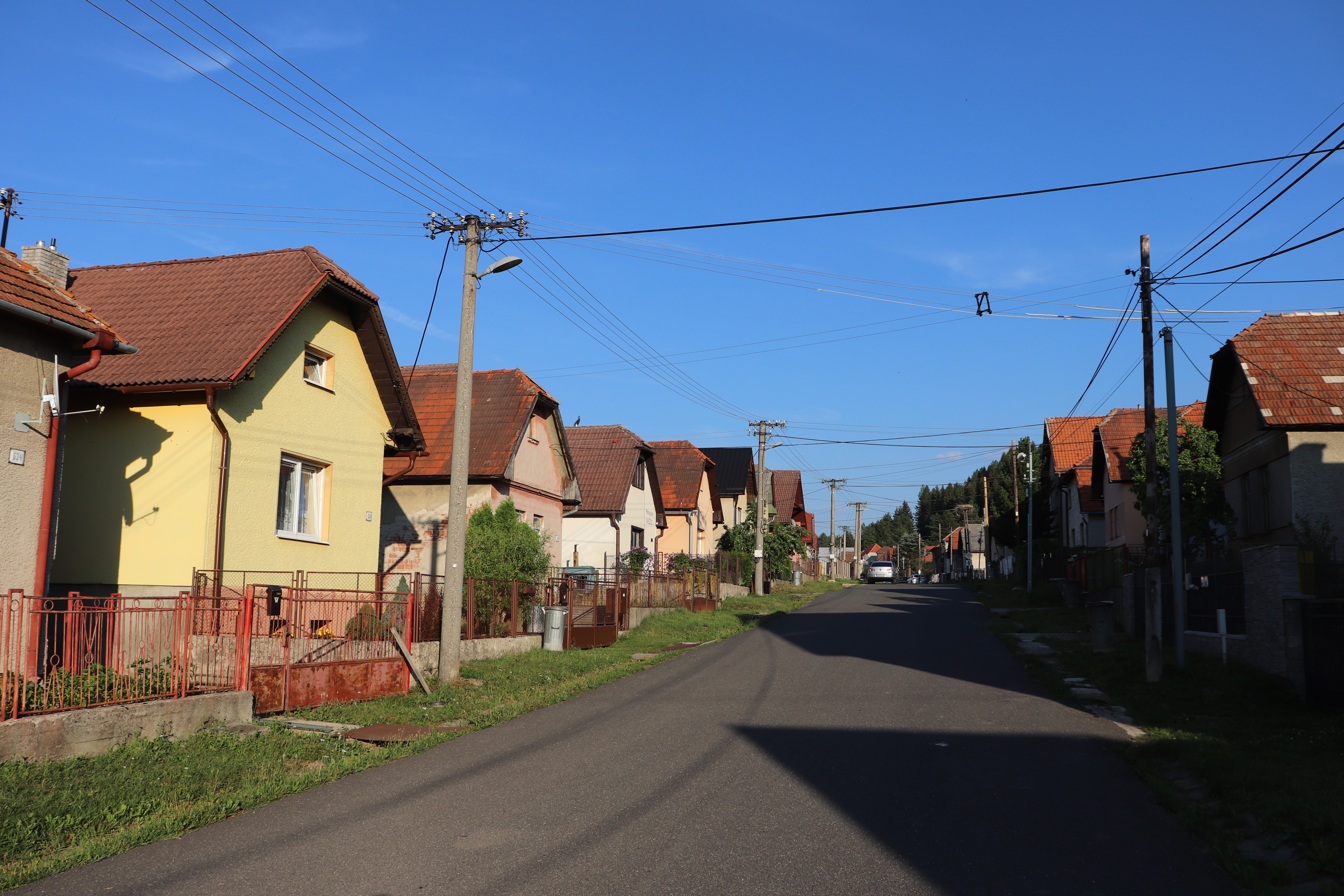

- Flag Coat of arms
- Etymology: derived from the Váh River
- Location of Važec in the Žilina Region Location of Važec in Slovakia
- Coordinates: 49.07°N 19.98°E
- Country: Slovakia
- Region: Žilina Region
- District: Liptovský Mikuláš District
- First mentioned: 1280

Area
  - Total: 59.68 km^{2} (23.04 sq mi)
- Elevation: 788 m (2,585 ft)

Population (2025)
  - Total: 2,366
- Time zone: UTC+1 (CET)
  - Summer (DST): UTC+2 (CEST)
- Postal code: 326 1
- Area code: +421 44
- Vehicle registration plate (until 2022): LM
- Website: www.obecvazec.sk

Važec (German: Waagsdorf or Weißwaag; Hungarian: Vázsec or Vágfalva) is a village and municipality in Liptovský Mikuláš District in the Žilina Region of northern Slovakia, at the foot of Kriváň in the High Tatras mountains, Slovakia's symbolic and often considered most beautiful mountain.

== History ==
In historical records the village was first mentioned in 1280. Jaroslav Augusta painted a number of watercolors of this village. Before the establishment of independent Czechoslovakia in 1918, Važec was part of Liptó County within the Kingdom of Hungary. From 1939 to 1945, it was part of the Slovak Republic. On 29 January 1945, the Red Army and the 1st Czechoslovak Army Corps entered Važec and it was once again part of Czechoslovakia.

=== Fire of 1931 ===
464 of the village's 582 homes were destroyed by fire July 17–18, 1931. The fire killed 6 persons and injured 18 others, resulted in the loss of hundreds of heads of stock, and produced damages estimated at $1 million in 1931 dollars. The fire originated from three different points, raising suspicion of incendiarism.

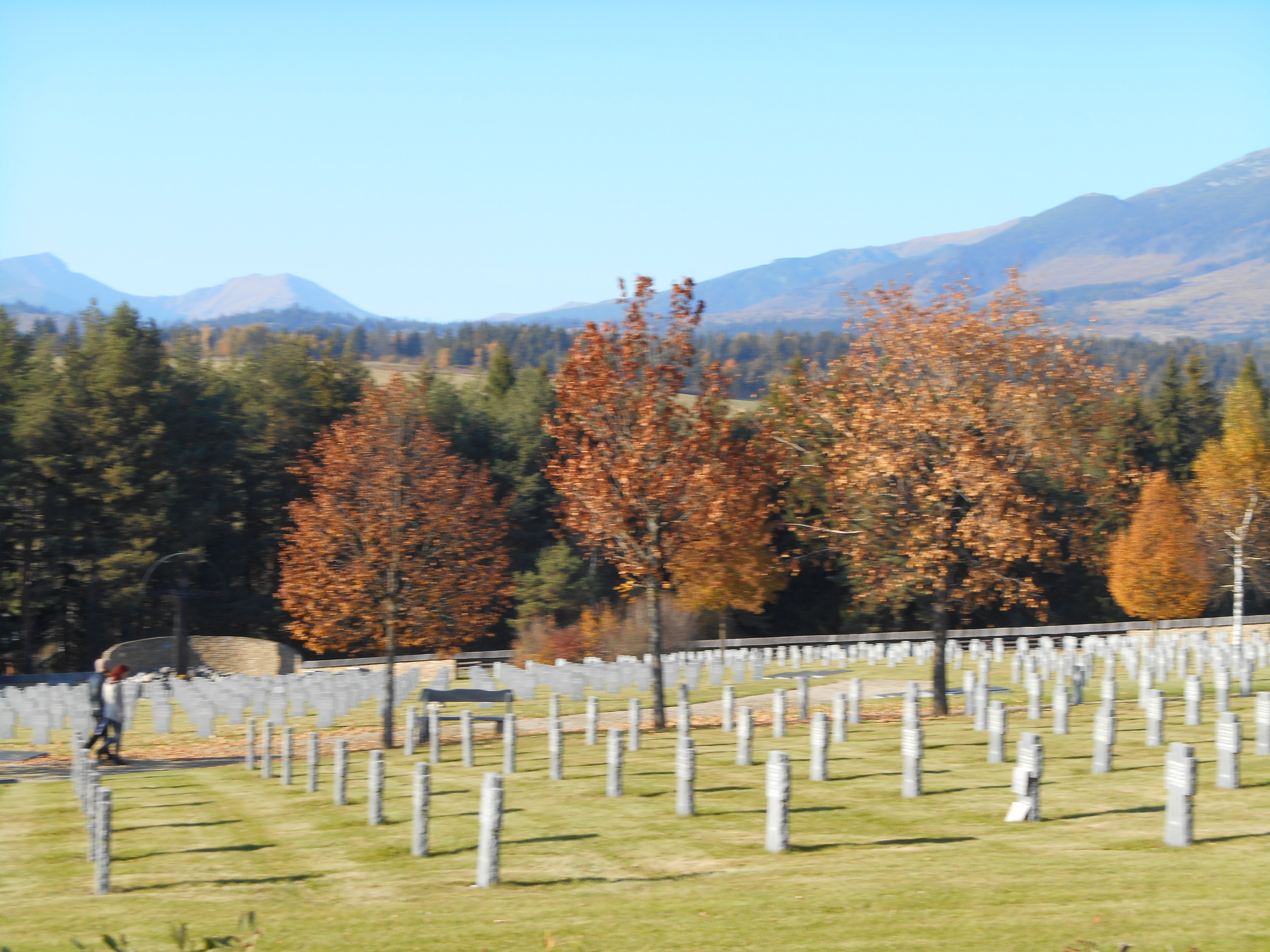
German Military Cemetery in Važec

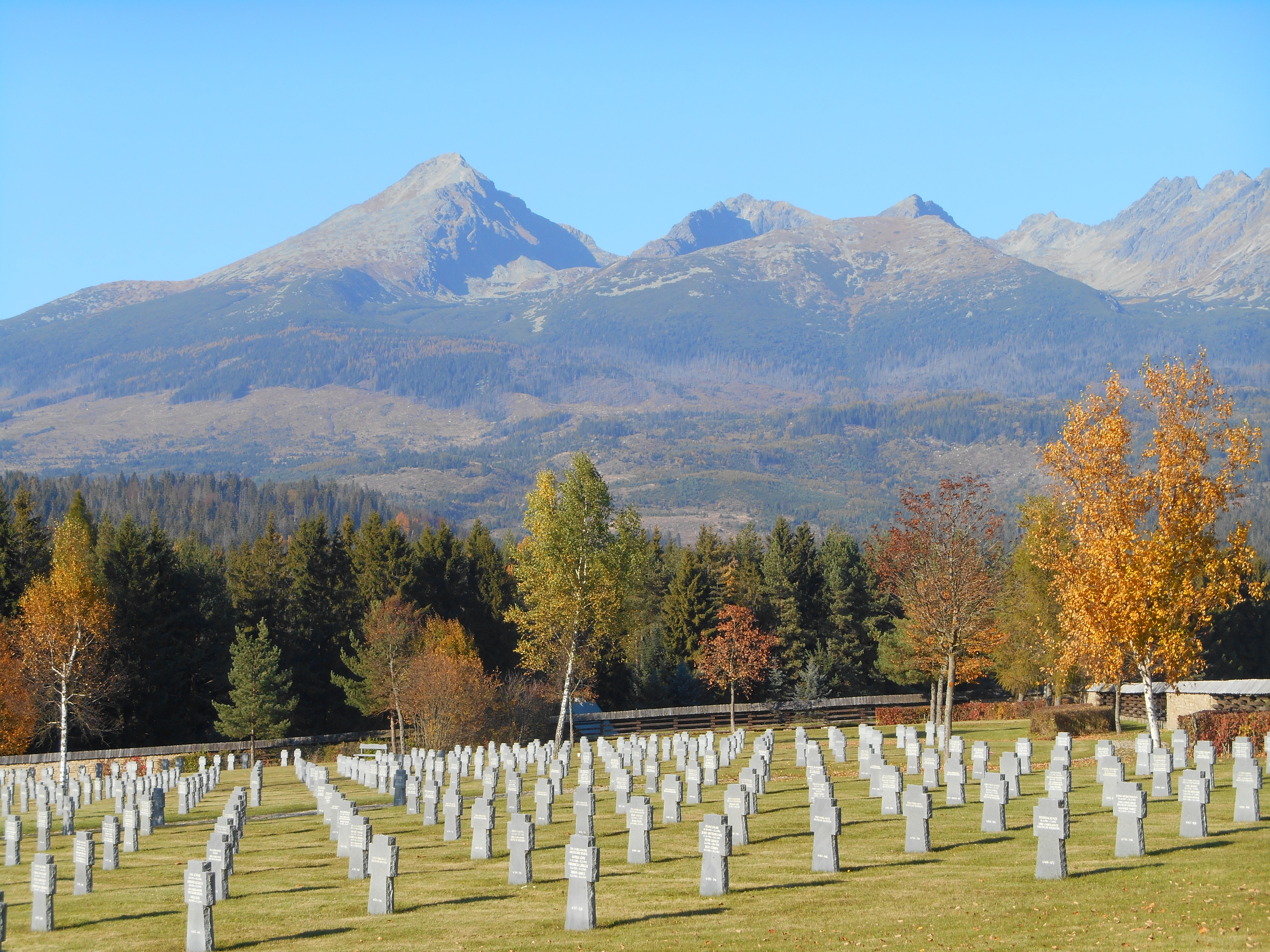
German Military Cemetery in Važec

== Geography ==
The municipality lies at an altitude of 788 metres (2,585 ft) and covers an area of 59.68 km^{2} (23.04 sq mi) (2025).

== Population ==
Population statistic (10 years)
Year	1995	2005	2015	2025
Count	2394	2363	2352	2366
Difference		−1.29%	−0.46%	+0.59%

Population statistic
Year	2024	2025
Count	2372	2366
Difference		−0.25%

It has a population of 2366 people (31 December 2025).

=== Ethnicity ===
Census 2021 (1+ %)
Ethnicity	Number	Fraction
Slovak	2145	90.05%
Not found out	219	9.19%
Romani	175	7.34%
Total	2382	

In year 2021 was 2382 people by ethnicity 2145 as Slovak, 219 as Not found out, 175 as Romani, 16 as Czech, 11 as Other, 4 as Polish, 3 as Rusyn, 3 as Hungarian, 2 as Russian, 2 as German, 1 as Ukrainian and 1 as Romanian.

Note on population: The difference values of population numbers in the table "Population statistic" and in the sections "Ethnicity" & "Religion" is caused by the use of various statistical methods.

=== Religion ===
Census 2021 (1+ %)
Religion	Number	Fraction
Evangelical Church	1036	43.49%
Roman Catholic Church	828	34.76%
None	224	9.4%
Not found out	220	9.24%
Total	2382	

In year 2021 was 2382 people by religion 1036 from Evangelical Church, 828 from Roman Catholic Church, 224 from None, 220 from Not found out, 17 from Other and not ascertained christian church, 15 from Greek Catholic Church, 12 from Jehovah's Witnesses, 6 from Ad hoc movements, 5 from Baptists Church, 3 from Eastern Orthodox Church, 3 from Paganism and natural spirituality, 3 from Other, 2 from Old Catholic Church, 2 from Christian Congregations in Slovakia, 2 from United Methodist Church, 2 from Buddhism, 1 from Islam and 1 from Seventh-day Adventist Church.
