= Jaroslav Augusta =

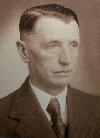
Jaroslav Augusta

Jaroslav Augusta (4 September 1878, Humpolec - 28 February 1970, Banská Štiavnica) was a Czech-born painter and art teacher, based in Slovakia.

== Biography ==
His father, Petr Augusta, was a local merchant. His younger brother, Karel Augusta, would also become a painter. From 1897-1901 he studied with Professor Maximilian Pirner at the Academy of Fine Arts in Prague. This was followed by three years at the Academy of Fine Arts, Munich, with Johann Caspar Herterich and Carl von Marr. His artistic education was completed at a private studio, where he developed an interest in folk art and customs. During this time, he founded an art colony at Detva (1901), and was among the founders of a group of Hungarian-Slovak artists (1903), based in Žilina.

He enlisted in World War I, and spent the years 1915-1918 as a Russian prisoner. This left him in poor health so, in 1920, he settled permanently in Banská Štiavnica, where he became a drawing professor. As time passed, he devoted himself less and less to painting. Later he received the title "Zasloužilý umělec" (Merited Artist), awarded by the Czechoslovak Socialist Republic. He wrote numerous articles for cultural magazines and an autobiography, Spomienky (Memories), which was published in 1962.

Western European and Slovak open-air landscape painting were major influences. He also excelled at genre painting and works with social or ethnographic elements. While in the Tatra village of Važec, he painted a well-known series of watercolors, which constitute an historical record of the area. He also travelled and painted extensively in the Liptov region.

His paintings are represented in museums throughout Slovakia and the Czech Republic, notably at the Moravian Gallery in Brno, and in several museums abroad.
