= Otakar Lebeda =

Czech natural painter (1877–1901)

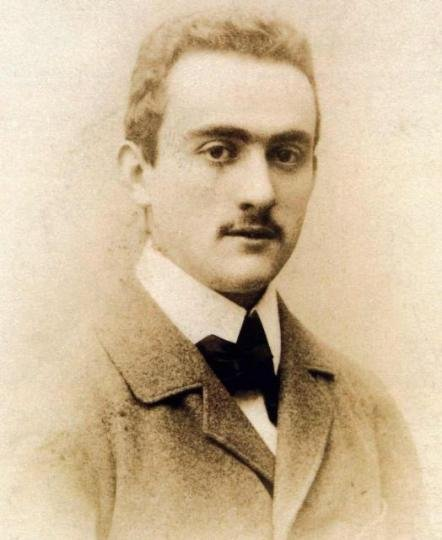
Otakar Lebeda (date unknown)

Otakar Lebeda (8 May 1877 in Prague – 12 April 1901 in Malá Chuchle, now part of Prague) was a Czech landscape and figure painter.

== Biography ==
His father was a carter and his mother was a storekeeper. His artistic talent manifested itself early and, at the age of fifteen, he was enrolled at the Academy of Fine Arts, where he studied with the landscape painter, Julius Mařák. Originally, his works were influenced by the Realistic style of artists such as Antonín Chittussi and Camille Corot.

In 1898, he was awarded a scholarship that enabled him to study in Paris, where he was exposed to the Barbizon school and the Impressionists. Upon returning, he came under the influence of his slightly older colleague, Antonín Slavíček, who was also a former student of Mařák's. In the final phase of his career, he turned from pure landscapes and began concentrating on figures. His large canvas, "Killed by Lightning" (which was never completed) contains some elements of what would become known as Expressionism.

For reasons that were never made clear, he committed suicide by shooting himself in the woods outside Malá Chuchle. His economic situation was secure and nothing in his correspondence suggested family problems. Eight months before his death, he made an extended visit to the spa at Žichovice, but the specific reason for it is unknown. Recent speculation centers on a depressive disorder that went undiagnosed due to his introverted personality.

== Selected paintings ==
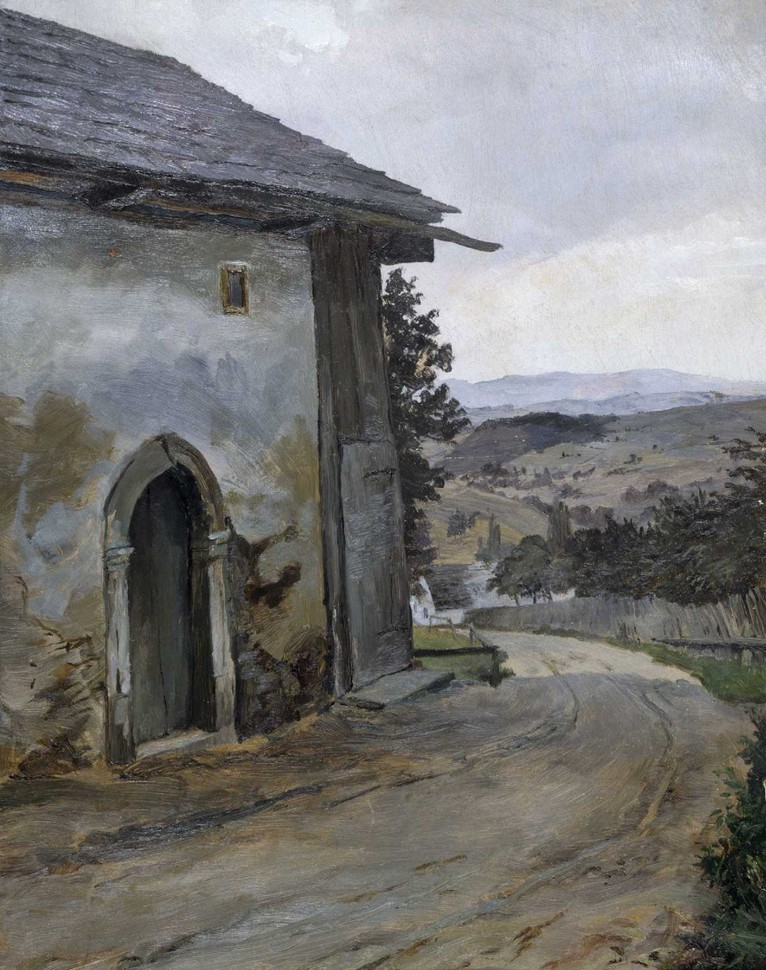
Path in the Giant Mountains

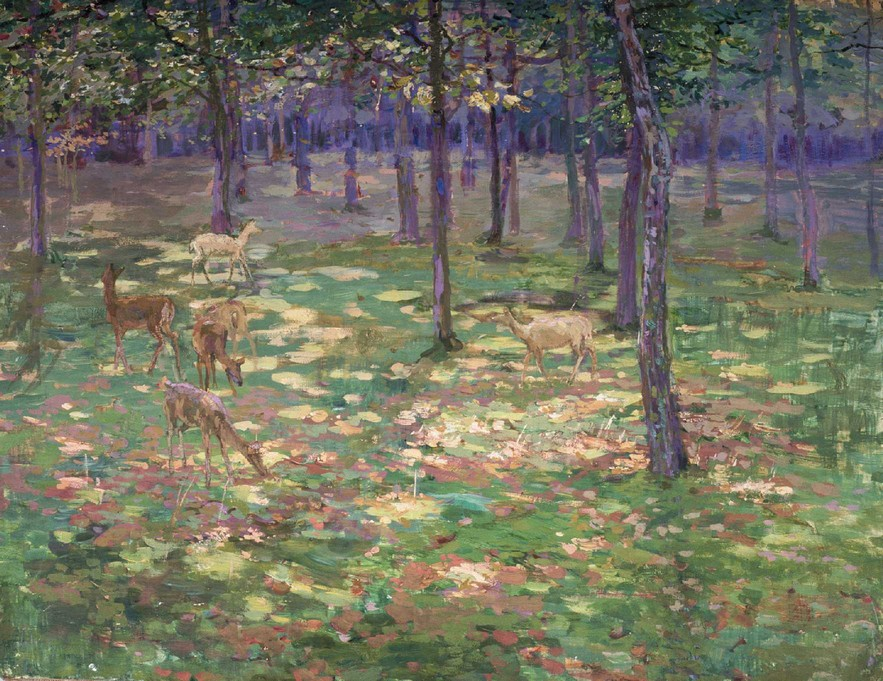
Deer at the Bechyňský
Game Reserve

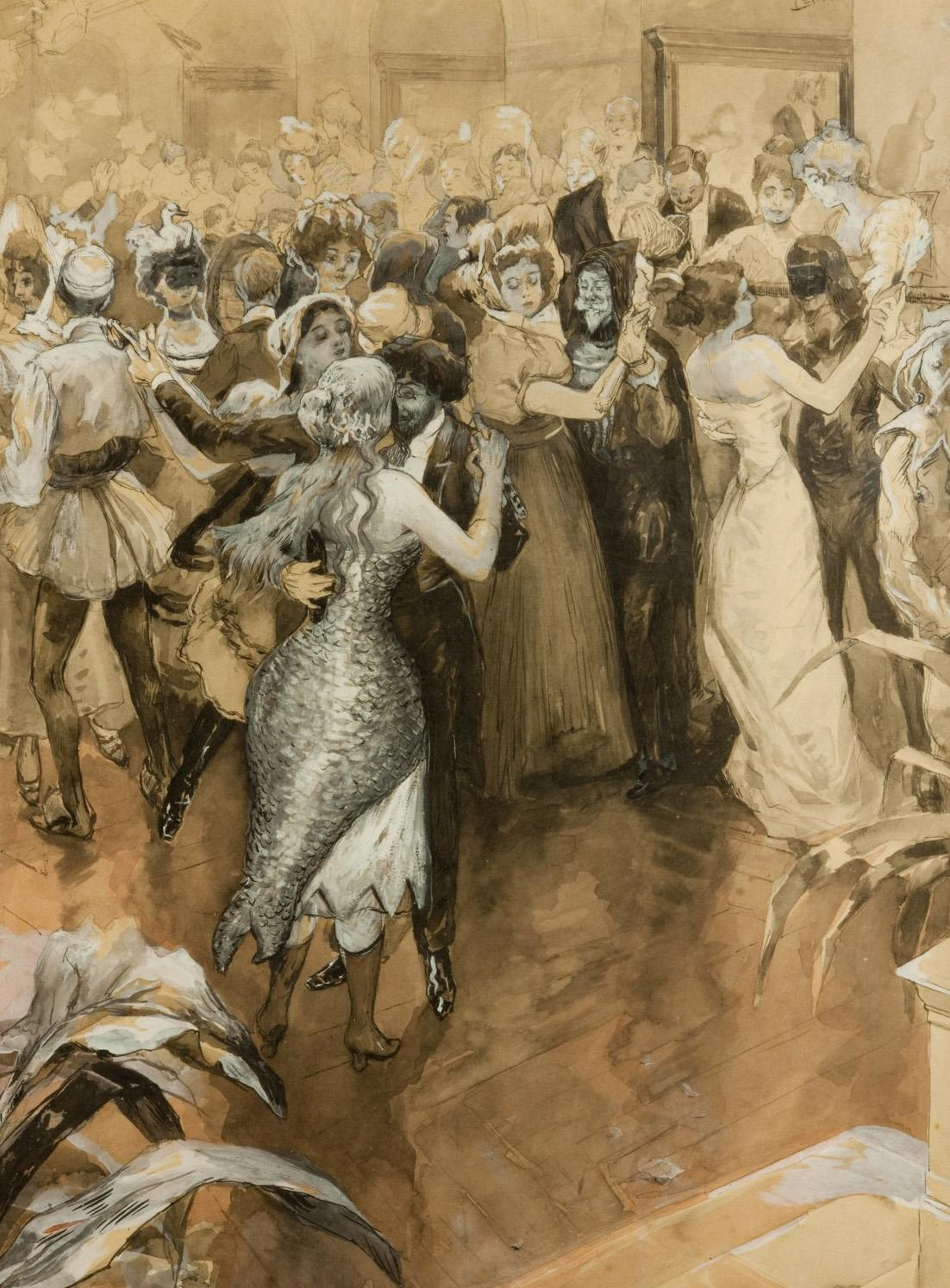
Masked Ball

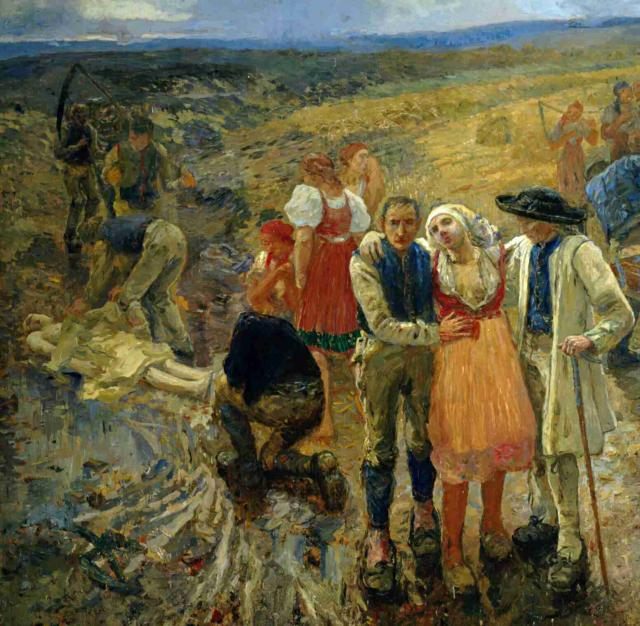
Killed by Lightning
