= Humpolec =

- Town
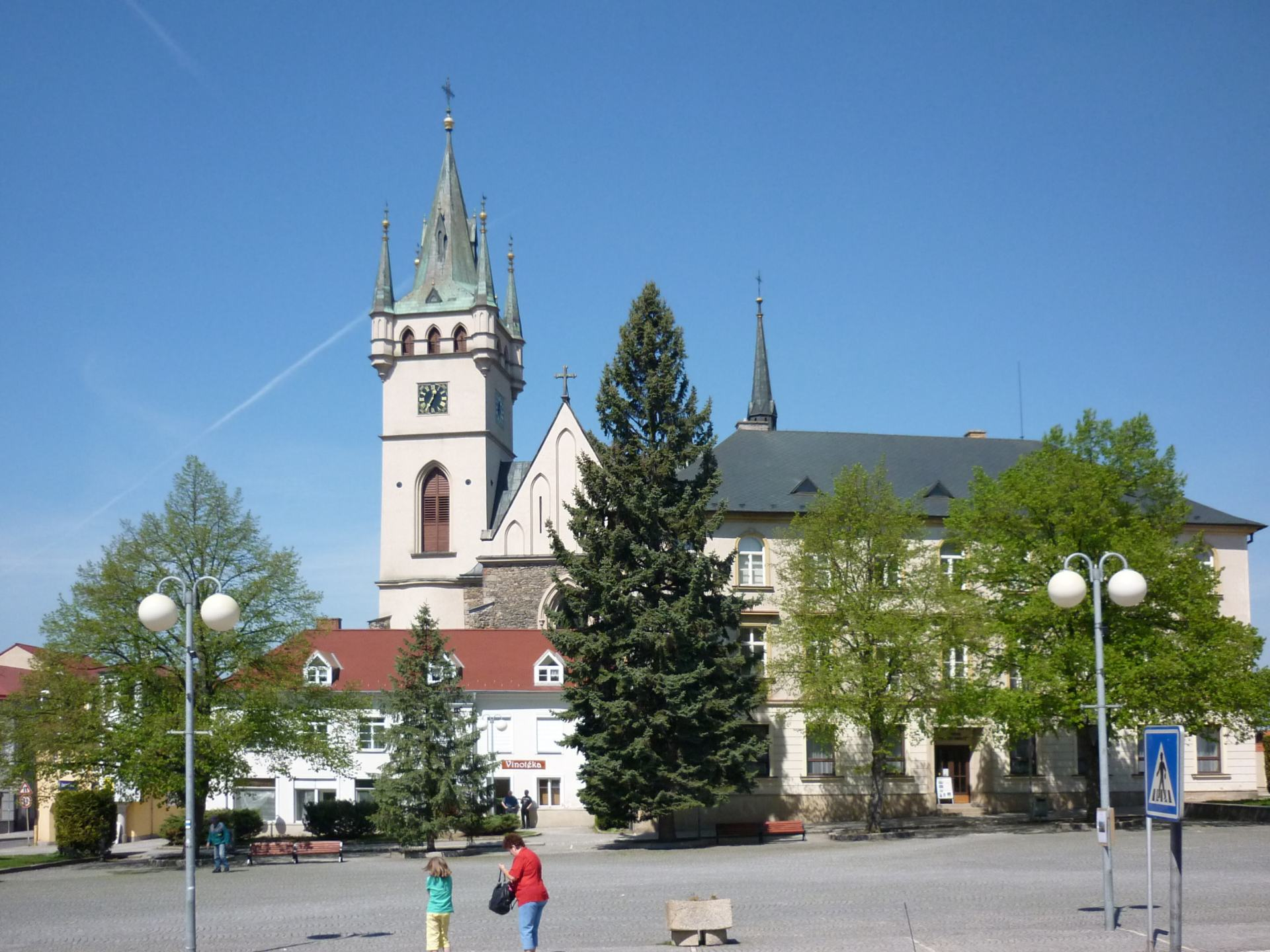
- The square Horní náměstí

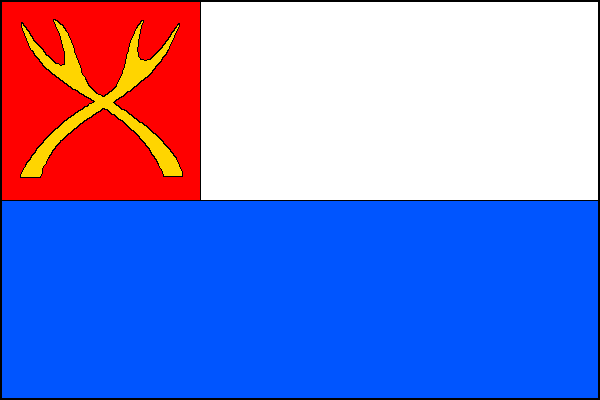
- Flag Coat of arms

- Location in the Czech Republic
- Coordinates: 49°32′30″N 15°21′26″E
- Country: Czech Republic
- Region: Vysočina
- District: Pelhřimov
- First mentioned: 1178

Government
  - Mayor: Vlastimil Brukner

Area
  - Total: 51.51 km^{2} (19.89 sq mi)
- Elevation: 527 m (1,729 ft)

Population (2026-01-01)
  - Total: 11,487
  - Density: 223.0/km^{2} (577.6/sq mi)
- Time zone: UTC+1 (CET)
  - Summer (DST): UTC+2 (CEST)
- Postal code: 396 01
- Website: www.humpolec.cz

Humpolec (Czech pronunciation: [ˈɦumpolɛts]; German: Humpoletz) is a town in Pelhřimov District in the Vysočina Region of the Czech Republic. It has about 11,000 inhabitants. The town is located in the Křemešník Highlands and its development in the Middle Ages was connected with silver mining. Humpolec is traditionally an industrial town, known today primarily for the Family Brewery Bernard and the engineering industry.

== Administrative division ==
Humpolec consists of 12 municipal parts (in brackets population according to the 2021 census):

- Humpolec (8,819)
- Brunka (33)
- Hněvkovice (391)
- Kletečná (179)
- Krasoňov (263)
- Lhotka (36)
- Petrovice (167)
- Plačkov (173)
- Rozkoš (293)
- Světlice (171)
- Světlický Dvůr (65)
- Vilémov (245)

== Etymology ==
The name is derived from the German personal name Gumpolt. The oldest written form of the name was Gumpoldis in Latin.

== Geography ==
Humpolec is located about 22 kilometres (14 mi) northwest of Jihlava, roughly halfway between Prague and Brno. It lies in the Křemešník Highlands. The highest point is the hill Krásná vyhlídka at 663 m (2,175 ft) above sea level. There is a significant amount of small fishponds, and some of them are in the urban area.

== History ==
The first written mention of Humpolec is from 1178. In the 13th–15th centuries, it was a silver mining town. Humpolec became known for drapery production from the 17th century, which reached its peak in the 19th century.

== Demographics ==
Historical population

| Year | Pop. | ±% |
|---|---|---|
| 1869 | 8,192 | — |
| 1880 | 8,514 | +3.9% |
| 1890 | 9,110 | +7.0% |
| 1900 | 9,152 | +0.5% |
| 1910 | 9,150 | −0.0% |

| Year | Pop. | ±% |
|---|---|---|
| 1921 | 8,812 | −3.7% |
| 1930 | 8,317 | −5.6% |
| 1950 | 7,706 | −7.3% |
| 1961 | 8,955 | +16.2% |
| 1970 | 9,727 | +8.6% |

| Year | Pop. | ±% |
|---|---|---|
| 1980 | 10,786 | +10.9% |
| 1991 | 11,122 | +3.1% |
| 2001 | 10,929 | −1.7% |
| 2011 | 11,024 | +0.9% |
| 2021 | 10,835 | −1.7% |

Source: Censuses

== Economy ==
Humpolec is traditionally an industrial town. The largest employers are Valeo Compressor Europe, a manufacturer of compressors for cars, the Family Brewery Bernard, which was established in 1597, and BJS Czech (a manufacturer of furniture).

== Transport ==
The D1 motorway from Prague to Brno passes through Humpolec.

The railway of local importance heading to Havlíčkův Brod begins here.

== Sights ==
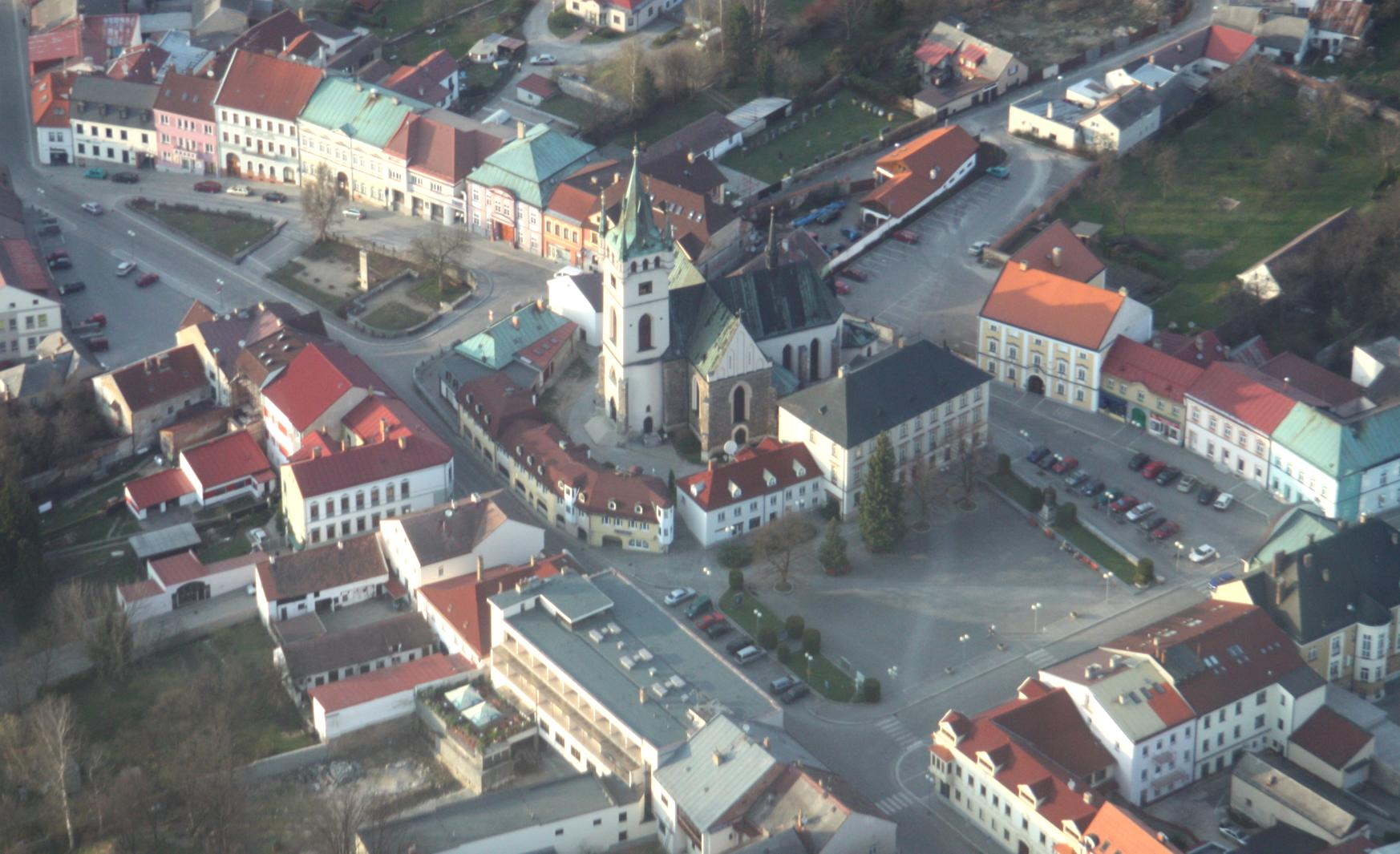
Aerial view of the historic centre

The Church of Saint Nicholas was originally an early Gothic church, rebuilt in the Gothic-Baroque style by Jan Santini Aichel in 1721–1722. Its current Neo-Gothic form is a result of the reconstruction in 1895.

The Evangelical church was built in the Historicist style in 1862, and the tower was added in 1890–1891. Together with the rectory from 1854 and the evangelical school, it forms an area protected as a cultural monument.

Since 2022, the chimney of the Family Brewery Bernard has a public observation deck in a height of 33 metres (108 ft), which is accessible over a spiral staircase with 189 steps. It is a part of the Visitor Centre of the brewery.

== Notable people ==
- Jan Želivský (1380–1422), priest
- Aleš Hrdlička (1869–1943), Czech-American anthropologist
- Josef Stránský (1872–1936), composer and conductor
- Anna Sychravová (1873–1925), politician
- Jaroslav Augusta (1878–1970), painter
- Inocenc Arnošt Bláha (1879–1960), sociologist and philosopher
- Anděla Kozáková-Jírová (1897–1986), lawyer
- Jan Zábrana (1931–1984), writer and translator; lived here as a child
- Ivan Martin Jirous (1944–2011), poet, underground writer and dissident
- Joseph Drapell (born 1940), Czech-Canadian painter
- Dusan Kadlec (1942–2018), Czech-Canadian painter
- Miluše Horská (born 1959), politician
- David Holoubek (born 1980), football manager
- Jan Kopic (born 1990), footballer

== Twin towns – sister cities ==
Humpolec is twinned with:

- Námestovo, Slovakia
