= Chlumek =

- Municipality
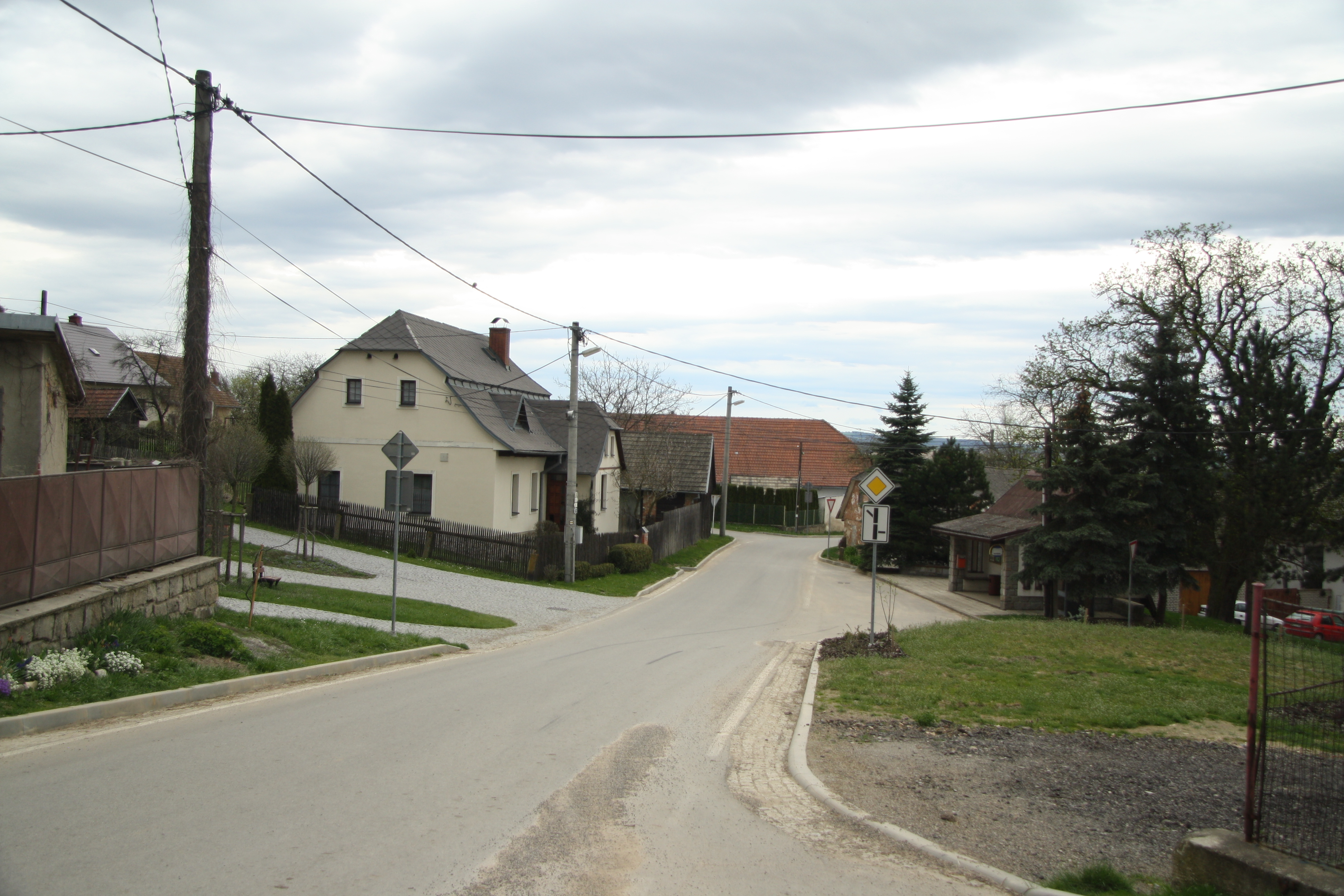
- Centre of Chlumek

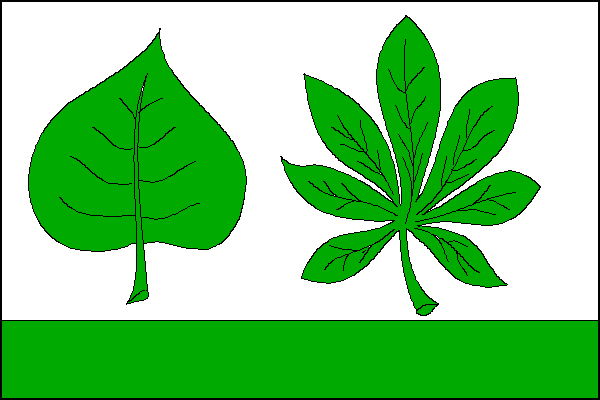
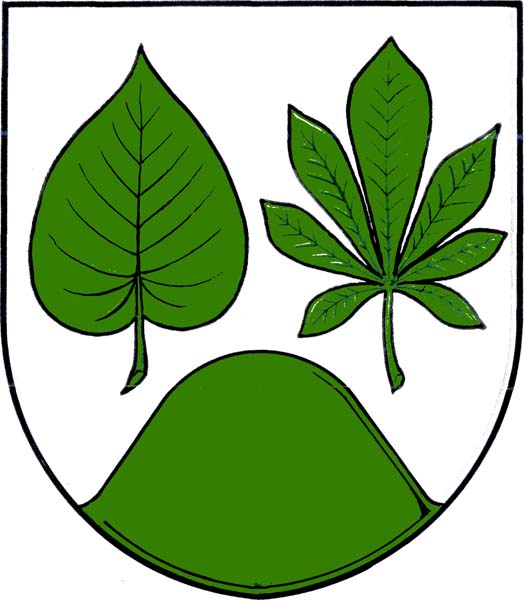
- Flag Coat of arms

- Location in the Czech Republic
- Coordinates: 49°22′28″N 15°51′17″E
- Country: Czech Republic
- Region: Vysočina
- District: Žďár nad Sázavou
- First mentioned: 1556

Area
  - Total: 6.58 km^{2} (2.54 sq mi)
- Elevation: 578 m (1,896 ft)

Population (2026-01-01)
  - Total: 160
  - Density: 24/km^{2} (63/sq mi)
- Time zone: UTC+1 (CET)
  - Summer (DST): UTC+2 (CEST)
- Postal codes: 594 42
- Website: www.chlumek.cz

Chlumek is a municipality and village in Žďár nad Sázavou District in the Vysočina Region of the Czech Republic. It has about 200 inhabitants.

Chlumek lies approximately 22 kilometres (14 mi) south of Žďár nad Sázavou, 20 km (12 mi) east of Jihlava, and 130 km (81 mi) south-east of Prague.

== Demographics ==
Historical population
Year	Pop.	±%
1869	300	—
1880	352	+17.3%
1890	326	−7.4%
1900	333	+2.1%
1910	346	+3.9%
1921	363	+4.9%
1930	369	+1.7%
1950	265	−28.2%
1961	292	+10.2%
1970	286	−2.1%
1980	251	−12.2%
1991	195	−22.3%
2001	180	−7.7%
2011	183	+1.7%
2021	169	−7.7%
Source: Censuses
