= Hyacinth Holland =

German art historian

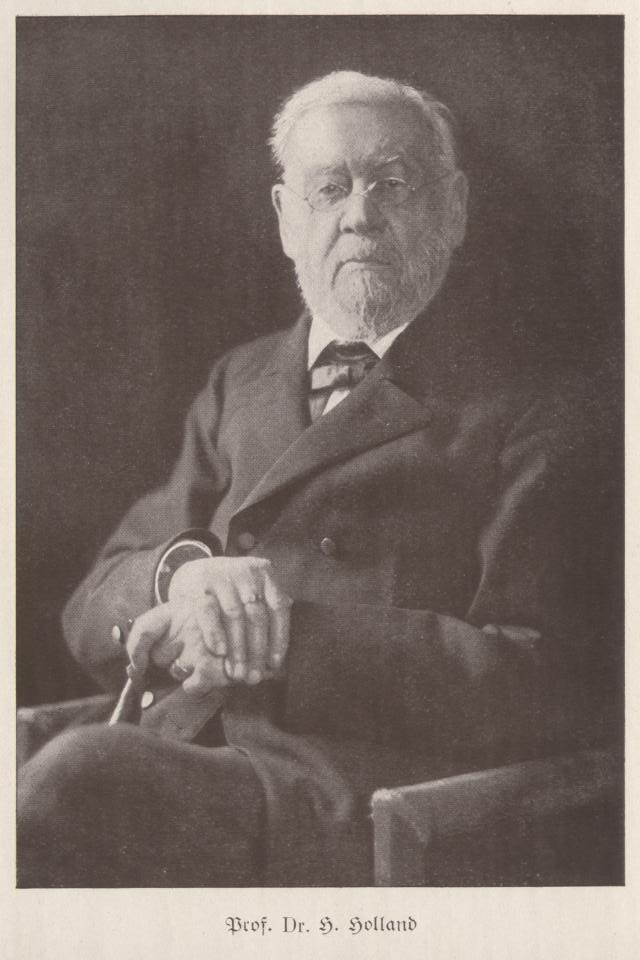
Hyacinth Holland (1907)

Hyacinth Holland (16 August 1827 – 16 January 1918) was a German art and literature historian.

== Life ==
Born in Munich, Holland was a son of the lawyer Christoph Holland and his wife Karoline Seel. In 1846 he passed the Abitur at the Wilhelmsgymnasium München. At the Universität of his hometown, Holland began to study Catholic theology, but later switched to law and medicine. He successfully completed his studies in art and literary history in 1853 at the University of Würzburg with a doctorate.

In 1853, Holland also made his successful debut as a writer; he published the first volume of a History of German Literature (planned for three volumes, this work remained a fragment). Throughout his life, he earned his living as a freelance contributor to various newspapers and magazines. In addition, he worked from time to time as an educator, among others as a tutor in the household of the Counts of Arco-Valley.

In 1865, Holland married the educator Maria Schmitt (1826-1905) in Munich. He had met her at the Ascher'sche Erziehungsinstitut, where he then held a teaching post until 1911.

Holland was in close contact with King Ludwig II of Bavaria and was instrumental as an advisor for his enigmatic thematic room decorations of the Neuschwanstein, Linderhof and Herrenchiemsee castles. According to Holland's statement, he had to "promise the king with a hand vow" that no one but himself and the king would gain insight into the (also esoteric) contents of the thematic world. According to the monographic study of the castles by the art historian Alexander Rauch, for example, the etymological interpretation of the name Lohengrin (Lohe = fire, Grien = face), which is significant for Neuschwanstein Castle, as the "sun's face" of the sun god Apollo (symbol of the Sun King Louis XIV) can be traced back to Holland.

Personal knowledge and a vast amount of collected documentation made Hyacinth Holland one of the most prolific Bavarian obituary writers and biographers of his time period. Especially for the Allgemeine Deutsche Biographie (ADB) and the Biographisches Jahrbuch he wrote numerous articles about Bavarian artists of the 19th century, some of whom would have been completely forgotten without him. Since 1870, he was a member of the Munich Verein für Christliche Kunst.

Holland died in Munich on 16 January 1918 at the age of 90 and found his final resting place there.

Holland's paternal uncle was the ennobled priest and pedagogue Benedict von Holland (1775-1853), head of the royal educational institution Hollandeum, in Munich.

== Publications ==
- Minnelieder. Ein Pfingstgruß. Wolf, Munich 1855.
- Geschichte der Münchener Frauenkirche, 1859,
- Kaiser Ludwig der Bayer und sein Stift zu Ettal. Rohsold, Munich 1860, Numerized.
- Die Entwicklung des deutschen Theaters und des Oberammergau Passion Play. Eine literatur-historische Studie. Fleischmann, Munich 1861, Numerized.
- Geschichte der altdeutschen Dichtkunst in Bayern, Pustet, Regensburg, 1862, Numerized.
- Moritz von Schwind. Sein Leben und seine Werke. Aus des Künstlers eigenen Briefen und den Erinnerungen seiner Freunde zusammengestellt. Neff, Munich 1873.
- Carl August Lebschée – Architektur= und Landschaftmaler. In Oberbayerisches Archiv für vaterländische Geschichte (Historischen Verein von Oberbayern, ed.), vol. 38, Munich 1879, pp. 127–164. (online).
- Theodor Horschelt. Ein Künstlerleben und -schaffen (Bayerische Bibliothek. Vol. 20, ZDB-ID 990901-1). Buchner, Bamberg 1890, Numerized.
- Ludwig Richter (Die Kunst dem Volke. Nr. 2, ZDB-ID 748403-3). Allgemeine Vereinigung für Christliche Kunst, Munich 1910.
- Lebenserinnerungen eines 90jährigen Altmünchners. Edited by A. Dreyer. Parcus-Verlag, Munich 1921 (Autobiography).
