= List of Czechs =

This is a partial list of famous Czech people. This list includes people born in Czech lands, people of the Czech nationality as well as people having some significant Czech ancestry or association with Czech culture.

Note: If you wish to add a name to this list, first add it here instead: Biography Stub Factory. This prevents the list from succumbing to a large amount of "red links".

== Actors ==
See Czech actors

- Lída Baarová
- Jiří Bartoška
- Vlasta Burian
- Anna Geislerová
- Nataša Gollová
- Jiří Grossmann
- Miroslav Horníček
- Rudolf Hrušínský
- Zorka Janů
- Petr Kostka
- Herbert Lom
- Adina Mandlová
- Vladimír Menšík
- Gustav Nezval
- David Nykl
- Anny Ondra (Anna Ondráková)
- Karel Roden
- Libuše Šafránková
- Jan Tříska
- Tatiana Vilhelmová
- Eduard Vojan
- Jiří Voskovec
- Clint Walker
- Jan Werich
- Stella Zázvorková

== Architects and designers ==
- Jan Santini Aichel
- Matthias of Arras
- Jakub Bursa
- Josef Chochol
- Kilian Ignaz Dientzenhofer
- Alois Dryák
- Josef Gočár
- Josef Hoffmann
- Eva Jiřičná
- František Maxmilián Kaňka
- Jan Kaplický
- Jan Kotěra
- Zdeněk Kovář
- Jakub Krčín
- Jaromír Krejcar
- Adolf Loos
- Josef Mocker
- Štěpánek Netolický
- Balthasar Neumann
- Josef Niklas
- Joseph Maria Olbrich
- Peter Parler
- Milada Petříková-Pavlíková
- Bořek Šípek

== Authors and poets ==
See Czech writers

- Michal Ajvaz
- Jindřich Šimon Baar
- Jan Blahoslav
- Karel Havlíček Borovský
- Alois Bohdan Brixius
- Max Brod
- Otokar Březina
- Karel Čapek
- Svatopluk Čech
- František Čelakovský
- Cosmas of Prague
- Jakub Deml
- Ivan Diviš
- Jaroslav Durych
- Viktor Dyk
- Marie von Ebner-Eschenbach
- Karel Jaromír Erben
- Jaroslav Foglar
- Julius Fučík
- Ladislav Fuks
- František Gellner
- Jaroslav Hašek
- Vladimír Holan
- Miroslav Holub
- Bohumil Hrabal
- Václav Hrabě
- František Hrubín
- Petr Hruška
- Josefa Humpalová–Zeman
- Miroslav Ivanov
- Boleslav Jablonský
- Josef Jedlička
- Milena Jesenská
- Alois Jirásek
- Franz Kafka
- Václav Kaplický
- Egon Kisch
- Václav Kliment Klicpera
- Pavel Kohout
- Václav Kosmák
- Karl Kraus
- Jan Křesadlo
- Karel Kryl
- Milan Kundera
- František Langer
- Bohuslav z Lobkovic
- Arnošt Lustig
- Karel Hynek Mácha
- Petr Maděra
- Jiří Mahen
- Rudolf Medek
- Ondřej Neff
- Vladimír Neff
- Božena Němcová
- Jan Neruda
- Vítězslav Nezval
- Ota Pavel
- Ferdinand Peroutka
- Eduard Petiška
- Otfried Preussler
- Bohuslav Reynek
- Rainer Maria Rilke
- John of Rokycan (Jan Rokycana)
- Karel Sabina
- Jaroslav Seifert
- Jan Skácel
- Josef Škvorecký
- Adalbert Stifter
- Tom Stoppard
- Zdeněk Svěrák
- Karel Teige
- Jáchym Topol
- Jan Matzal Troska
- Josef Kajetán Tyl
- Miloš Urban
- Josef Váchal
- Vladislav Vančura
- Michal Viewegh
- Jiří Šlitr
- Jiří Suchý
- Jaroslav Vrchlický
- Franz Werfel
- Jan Werich
- Ivan Wernisch
- Zikmund Winter
- Jiří Wolker
- Jan Zábrana
- Jan Zahradníček
- Vojtech Zamarovský
- Julius Zeyer

== Composers ==
See Czech composers

- Ralph Benatzky
- František Benda
- Jiří Antonín Benda
- Karel Bendl
- Heinrich Ignaz Franz Biber
- Vilém Blodek
- Pavel Borkovec
- František Xaver Brixi
- Bohuslav Černohorský
- Alexander Dreyschock
- František Xaver Dušek
- Jan Ladislav Dusík
- Antonín Dvořák
- Josef Fiala
- Zdeněk Fibich
- Josef Bohuslav Foerster
- Vladimír Franz
- Julius Fučík
- Pavel Haas
- Alois Hába
- Jan Hammer
- Jan Hanuš
- Kryštof Harant z Polžic a Bezdružic
- Ilja Hurník
- Leoš Janáček
- Otakar Jeremiáš
- Jaroslav Ježek
- Karel Boleslav Jirák
- Vojtěch Jírovec (also known as Adalbert Gyrowetz)
- Václav Kaprál
- Vítězslava Kaprálová
- Rudolf Karel
- Erich Wolfgang Korngold
- Petr Kotík
- Jan Antonín Koželuh
- Leopold Koželuh
- Hans Krása (Jewish)
- Ernst Krenek
- Jan Křtitel Krumpholtz
- Jan Kubelík
- Rafael Kubelík
- Ladislav Kubík
- Jan Křtitel Kuchař (also known as Johann Baptist Kucharz)
- Jiří Ignác Linek
- Gustav Mahler (Jewish)
- Bohuslav Martinů
- František Míča
- Adam Václav Michna z Otradovic
- Oskar Morawetz
- Josef Mysliveček
- Oskar Nedbal
- Jan Novák
- Vítězslav Novák
- Antonín Rejcha
- František Xaver Richter (Franz Xaver Richter)
- Jan Jakub Ryba
- Ervín Schulhoff (Jewish)
- Josef Seger
- František Škroup
- Bedřich Smetana
- Anton Stamitz (Cz. Stamic) (half-German)
- Karel Stamitz (Cz. Stamic) (half-German)
- Johann Stamitz (Cz. Stamic)
- Josef Suk
- Karel Svoboda
- Viktor Ullmann
- Dalibor Cyril Vačkář
- Jaromír Vejvoda
- Jan Václav Voříšek
- Pavel Vranický (also known as Paul Wranitzky)
- Ladislav Vycpálek
- Johann Baptist Wanhal (Jan Ignatius Vaňhal)
- Jan Zach
- Jan Dismas Zelenka
- Otakar Zich

== Other musicians ==
See Czech musicians

- Karel Ančerl, conductor
- Jiří Bělohlávek, conductor
- Gabriela Beňačková, opera singer
- Victoria Blyth, singer
- Alfred Brendel, pianist
- Ema Destinnová, opera singer
- Ewa Farna, pop singer
- Michaela Fukačová, cellist
- Karel Gott, singer
- Alice Herz-Sommer, pianist
- Maria Jeritza, opera singer
- Jiří Jirmal, guitarist
- Markéta Irglová, singer, actress, Oscar prize winner
- Mikolas Josef, pop singer
- Gabriela Gunčíková, pop singer
- Martina Bárta, pop singer
- Marta Jandová, pop singer
- Vaclav Noid Barta, pop singer
- Tomas Kalnoky, singer, guitarist and composer
- Karel Kovařovic, conductor
- Magdalena Kožená, opera singer
- Antonín Kraft, cellist
- Ivan Kral, guitarist and singer
- Karel Kryl, songwriter
- Jan Kubelík, violinist
- Daniel Landa, singer
- Aneta Langerová, singer
- Ferdinand Laub, violinist
- Jan Antonín Losy, lute player
- Waldemar Matuška, singer-songwriter and actor
- Ivan Moravec, pianist
- Ignaz Moscheles, pianist
- Eduard Nápravník, conductor
- Václav Neumann, conductor
- Jaromír Nohavica, guitarist and songwriter
- Jarmila Novotná, opera singer
- Josef Páleníček, pianist
- Libor Pešek, conductor
- Karel Plíhal, guitarist and songwriter
- David Popper, cellist
- Friederike Proch Benesch, pianist and composer
- Rudolf Serkin, pianist
- Otakar Ševčík, violinist
- Leo Slezak, opera singer
- Jiří Stivín, flute player
- Karel Strakatý, singer
- Vaclav Talich, conductor
- Vilém Tauský, conductor
- Štěpán Rak, guitarist
- Zuzana Růžičková, harpsichordist
- Miroslav Vitouš, jazzman
- Antonín Vranický (also known as Anton Wrani(t)zky), violinist
- Hana Zagorová, singer
- Wojciech Żywny, pianist

== Filmmakers ==
See Czech Film Directors

- František Čáp, film director
- Věra Chytilová, film director
- Miloš Forman, film director
- Karl Freund, film director
- Jan Hřebejk, film director
- Jaromil Jireš, film director
- Elmar Klos, film director
- Oldřich Lipský, film director, screenwriter
- Jiří Menzel, film director, actor
- Zdeněk Miler, film director
- Georg Wilhelm Pabst, film director
- Ivan Passer, film director
- Jan Pinkava, animator, film director
- Břetislav Pojar, film director
- Alfréd Radok, film and theatre director
- Emil Radok, film director
- Karel Reisz, film director
- Bohdan Sláma, film director
- Ladislav Smoljak, film director
- Jan Švankmajer, film director, animator
- Jan Svěrák, film director, actor
- Jan Tománek, film director, artist and writer
- Jiří Trnka, film director, animator
- Zdeněk Troška, film director, screenwriter
- Hermína Týrlová, stage designer, cartoonist
- Otakar Vávra, film director
- František Vláčil, film director
- Karel Zeman, film director, animator

== Military ==
- Jan Kubiš, paratrooper, the assassination of Heydrich
- Jozef Gabčík, paratrooper, the assassination of Heydrich (Slovak)
- Josef Bryks, pilot
- Josef Alexej Eisenberger, World War II general
- Alois Eliáš, army officer, member of the Czechoslovak legion
- Josef František, pilot ace
- Radola Gajda, army officer, member of the Czechoslovak legion
- Kurt Knispel, German Tank Ace (Sudeten German)
- Karel Kuttelwascher, general, pilot ace
- František Moravec, military intelligence officer, member of the Czechoslovak legion in World War I
- František Peřina, pilot ace
- Prokop the Great, Hussite leader
- Joseph Radetzky von Radetz, field marshal
- Ludvík Svoboda, general, president
- Jan Syrový, general, prime minister, member of the Czechoslovak legion
- Albrecht von Wallenstein, warlord during Thirty Years' War
- Jan Žižka, Hussite leader
- Otakar Jaroš, army officer during World War II
- Karel Klapálek, army officer during World War II, commander of the Czechoslovak 11th Infantry Battalion and 1st Czechoslovak Army Corps
- Josef Šnejdárek, soldier of French Foreign Legion, commander of the Czechoslovak army and Czechoslovak legion

== Models ==
See Czech models

- Tereza Fajksová (born 1989)
- Eva Herzigová (born 1973)
- Karolína Kurková (born 1984)
- Tereza Maxová (born 1971)
- Petra Němcová (born 1979)
- Daniela Peštová (born 1970)
- Pavlína Pořízková (born 1965)
- Alena Šeredová (born 1978)
- Hana Soukupová (born 1985)
- Ivana Trump (1949-2022)
- Veronika Vařeková (born 1977)

== Painters ==
See Czech Painters

- Mikoláš Aleš
- Petr Brandl
- Václav Brožík
- Ota Bubeníček
- Zdeněk Burian
- Josef Čapek
- Antonin Chittussi
- Alén Diviš
- Emil Filla
- Václav Hollar
- Stanislav Holý
- Jan Jakub Quirin Jahn
- Ludmila Janovská
- František Kaván
- Karel Klíč, inventor of photogravure
- Jiří Kolář
- Jan Konůpek
- Ludvík Kuba
- Alfred Kubin
- Otakar Kubín
- Jan Kupecký
- František Kupka
- Josef Lada
- Martin Mainer
- Josef Mánes
- Julius Edvard Marak
- Mikuláš Medek
- Anton Raphael Mengs
- Alfons Mucha
- Josef Navrátil
- Emil Orlik
- Jaro Procházka
- Václav Vavřinec Reiner
- Teodor Rotrekl
- Jan Preisler
- Otakar Sedloň
- Karel Škréta
- Antonín Slavíček
- Václav Špála
- Eva Švankmajerová
- Theodoric of Prague
- Toyen (Marie Čermínová)
- Vladimír Vašíček
- Helena Zmatlíková
- Jan Zrzavý

== Philosophers ==
See Czech philosophers

- Václav Bělohradský (born 1944)
- Arnošt Bláha (1879–1960), sociologist
- Egon Bondy (1930–2007)
- Václav Černý (1905–1987)
- Petr Chelčický (c.1390–c.1460)
- Herbert Feigl (1902–1988)
- Vilém Flusser (1920–1991)
- Ernest Gellner (1925–1995)
- Edmund Husserl (1859–1938)
- Jerome of Prague (1379–1416)
- Karl Kautsky (1854–1938)
- Hans Kelsen (1881–1973)
- František Klácel (1808–1882)
- Ladislav Klíma (1878–1928)
- Jan Amos Komenský (1592–1670)
- Karel Kosík (1926–2003)
- Jan Patočka (1907–1977)
- Emanuel Rádl (1873–1942)
- Radovan Richta (1924–1983)

== Photographers ==
See Czech photographers

- Rudolf Bruner-Dvořák
- František Drtikol
- Jaromír Funke
- Josef Koudelka
- Antonin Kratochvil
- Frank Plicka
- Jan Saudek
- Alexander Seik
- Ladislav Sitenský
- Josef Sudek
- Miroslav Tichý

== Politicians ==
- Madeleine Albright, first female United States Secretary of State in U.S. history
- Ivana Bacik, Irish law professor and politician of Czech descent
- Edvard Beneš, president of Czechoslovakia from 1935 to 1938 and again from 1945 to 1948
- Jerzy Buzek, prime Minister of Poland from 1997 to 2001 and president of the European Parliament 2009 to 2012
- Charles IV, King of Bohemia and Holy Roman Emperor
- Karl von Czyhlarz, Czech-Austrian jurist
- Klement Gottwald, first communist president
- Emil Hácha, president during the German occupation
- Václav Havel, first president after the fall of communism, first president of the independent Czech Republic
- Milada Horáková, politician anad activist hanged by the Communists
- Otto Jelinek, former Canadian Federal Cabinet Minister
- Václav Klaus, former prime minister and expresident of the Czech Republic
- Juscelino Kubitschek, President of Brazil (1956–1961)
- Jan Masaryk, foreign minister
- Tomáš G. Masaryk, first president of Czechoslovakia
- Mikuláš of Hus, politician, Hussite
- Emanuel Moravec, collaborator with Nazis
- Antonín Novotný, communist president
- Přemysl Otakar II, King of Bohemia and most powerful man in middle Europe in his era
- George of Poděbrady, Hussite king
- Karl Renner, Austrian first President after World War II
- Rudolf II, King of Bohemia and Holy Roman Emperor
- Adolf Schärf, President of Austria
- Jan Švejnar, US-based, Czech-born economist
- Ludvík Svoboda, communist president
- Mirek Topolánek, former Prime Minister
- Wenceslas I, Duke of Bohemia (Saint Wenceslas, Václav), known as "Good King Wenceslas" in a Christmas carol
- Wenceslaus IV of Bohemia, king
- Miloš Zeman, first directly elected president in Czech history

== Religion ==
- Josef Beran, cardinal
- Petr Chelčický, thinker, religious reformer
- Tomáš Halík, catholic theologian, sociologist
- Jan Hus, religious thinker and reformer
- Judah Loew ben Bezalel, Talmudic scholar
- Tomáš Špidlík, cardinal, thinker
- František Tomášek, cardinal

== Saints ==
- Saint Adalbert of Prague (Vojtěch in Czech), bishop of Prague, missionary and martyr
- Saint Agnes of Bohemia, Anežka Česká
- Saint John of Nepomuk, known through central Europe
- Saint John Neumann (John Nepomucene Neumann)
- Saint John Sarkander, priest tortured to death in Olomouc
- Saint Ludmila, princess of Bohemia, grandmother of St. Wenceslas
- Saint Prokop, canon and hermit
- Saint Wenceslas, duke of Bohemia
- Saint Gorazd (Pavlík), Eastern Orthodox new martyr, bishop of Prague, and metropolitan of the Czech lands and Slovakia

== Sculptors ==
See Czech sculptors

- Franta Bělský
- Břetislav Benda
- František Bílek
- Matthias Bernard Braun
- Ferdinand Maxmilian Brokoff
- Jan Brokoff
- Michael Joseph Brokoff
- Alfréd Hrdlička
- Bohumil Kafka
- Vincenc Makovský
- Josef Václav Myslbek
- Zoja Trofimiuk
- Lea Vivot
- Vladimir Winkler
- Ladislav Zívr
- Olbram Zoubek

== Scientists ==
See Czech Scientists

- Karel Absolon, archaeologist and speleologist
- Josef Augusta, paleontologist and popularizer of science
- Jiří Baborovský, chemist
- Jindřich Bačkovský, physicist
- Jan Bašta, engineer and researcher
- Eugen Böhm von Bawerk, economist
- Bohumila Bednářová, astronomer
- František Běhounek, radiologist, writer, and explorer
- Vincent Bochdalek, anatomist
- Johann Böhm, chemist
- Bernard Bolzano, mathematician, philosopher, and theologian
- Otakar Borůvka, mathematician
- Josef Božek engineer
- Eduard Čech, mathematician
- František Čelakovský, linguist and writer
- Václav Cílek, geologist and popularizer of science
- Jan Amos Comenius, polyhistorian, educator, and the inventor of illustrated textbooks
- Gerty Cori, biochemist and Nobel Prize laureate
- Carl Ferdinand Cori, biochemist and Nobel Prize laureate
- Leander Czerny, biologist
- Václav Prokop Diviš, priest, scientist and inventor
- Josef Dobrovský, philologist and historian
- Karel Fortyn, physician
- Sigmund Freud, psychologist
- František Josef Gerstner, physicist and engineer
- Kurt Gödel, mathematician
- Stanislav Grof, psychologist and researcher in transpersonal psychology
- Peter Grünberg, physicist and Nobel Prize in Physics laureate
- Jiří Grygar, astrophysicist, popularizer of science
- Jan Hajek, scientist
- Jaroslav Hájek, mathematician
- Tadeáš Hájek, physician and astronomer
- Lumír Ondřej Hanuš, chemist, co-discovered anandamide, an endogenous cannabinoid neurotransmitter
- Ferdinand Ritter von Hebra, dermatologist
- Jaroslav Heyrovský, chemist, winner of the Nobel Prize in Chemistry in 1959
- Václav Hlavatý, mathematician
- Ivan Honl, biologist
- Kamil Hornoch, amateur astronomer
- Bedřich Hrozný, linguist
- Jakub Husnik, inventor and painter
- Jan Janský, physician, discovered blood types
- Karl Guthe Jansky, engineer
- Vojtěch Jarník, mathematician
- Konstantin Jireček, historian
- Otto Jírovec, parasitologist and protozoologist
- Georg Joseph Kamel, botanist
- Vlasta Kálalová, physician and entomologist
- Karel Kavina, botanist
- Jan Kmenta, economist and econometrician
- Luboš Kohoutek, astronomer
- František Koláček, physicist
- Zdenek Kopal, astronomer
- František Křižík, an inventor of the arc lamp
- Bohumil Kučera, physicist
- Jaroslav Kurzweil, mathematician
- Václav Láska, geophysicist and mathematician
- Mathias Lerch, mathematician
- Hana Librová, biologist
- Drahoslav Lím, chemist and the inventor of hydrogel
- Johann Josef Loschmidt, chemist
- Ernst Mach, physicist and expert in aerodynamics
- Frank Malina, aeronautical engineer
- Jan Marek Marci, physician
- Zdeněk Matějka, chemist
- Gregor Mendel, founder of the science of genetics
- Antonín Mrkos, astronomer
- Johann Palisa, astronomer
- František Patočka, biologist
- Karel Petr, mathematician
- Josef Ladislav Píč, archaeologist
- George Placzek, physicist
- Julius Pokorny, etymologist
- Ferdinand Porsche, automotive engineer
- Křišťan of Prachatice, medieval astronomer and physician
- Petr Pravec, astronomer
- Jan Svatopluk Presl, chemist
- Karel Presl, botanist
- Stanislaus von Prowazek, zoologist and parasitologist
- Vlastimil Pták, mathematician
- Jan Evangelista Purkyně, physiologist who first recognised the individuality of fingerprints
- Zdeněk Rejdák, scientist in psychotronics
- Josef Ludvík František Ressel, an inventor of the ship's propeller
- Karel Rokytanský, anatomist
- Karel Rychlík, mathematician
- Vojtěch Šafařík, chemist
- Jaroslav Šafránek, physicist
- Heinrich Wilhelm Schott, botanist
- Joseph Schumpeter, economist
- Bohumil Sekla, biologist
- Alois Senefelder, inventor of the printing technique of lithography
- August Seydler, physicist and astronomer
- Ota Šik, economist
- Jan Šindel, astronomer
- Josef Škoda, physician
- Ferdinand Stoliczka, paleontologist
- Vincenc Strouhal, physicist
- František Josef Studnička, mathematician
- Antonín Svoboda, computer scientist and mathematician
- Karl von Terzaghi, geotechnical engineer and geologist
- Olga Taussky-Todd, mathematician
- Jana Tichá, astronomer
- Miloš Tichý, astronomer
- Viktor Trkal, physicist and mathematician
- Miloslav Valouch, mathematician
- Petr Vopěnka, mathematician
- Jindřich Wankel, paleontologist
- Rudolf Weigl, biologist
- Max Wertheimer, psychologist
- Otto Wichterle, chemist and the inventor of the modern contact lens
- Karel Zahradnik, mathematician
- Rudolf Zahradník, chemist
- František Záviška, physicist
- John Zeleny, physicist and the inventor of the electroscope
- Vladimír Zoubek, geologist
- Petr Zuman, electrochemist

== Linguistics, anthropology, history ==
- Karla Absolonová-Bufková, writer, ethnographer and folklorist
- Guido Adler, musicologist
- Lucie Bakešová, folklorist
- Bohuslav Balbín, historian
- Max Dvořák, art historian
- Eva Hajičová, linguist
- Eduard Hanslick, musicologist
- Vlasta Havelková, ethnographer, archaeologist and folklorist
- Aleš Hrdlička, medical doctor, anthropologist
- Bedřich Hrozný, philologist and orientalist (decipherer of Hittite)
- Konstantin Jireček, slavist, historian
- Josef Jungmann, linguist
- Rosa Junck, translator and Esperantist
- Henry Kučera, linguist, cognitive scientist, language software author
- Bohumil Mathesius, translator
- Vilém Mathesius, linguist
- Josef Vratislav Monse, founder of Moravian history-writing
- Jan Mukařovský, literary theorist
- Alois Musil, orientalist, explorer
- František Palacký, historian
- Antonín Rezek, historian
- František Roubík, historian
- August Sedláček, historian
- Petr Sgall, linguist
- Jindřich Wankel, paleontologist
- Lukáš M. Vytlačil, historian, flutist and musicologist
- Čeněk Zíbrt, ethnographer, historian

== Entrepreneurs ==
- Jan Antonín Baťa, industrialist (Baťa a.s., Zlin, Bata Tires, Fatra, Kotva, FAB Zlin (film industry) at Kudlov, ZLAS (Aircraft Otrokovice), ZPA Zlin, ChemoSvit, TatraSvit, Zlin Magazine, founded towns of Batovany (Partizanske), Svit, Batov (Otrokovice))
- Tomáš Baťa, industrialist (Bata T&A, Zlin)
- Emil Kolben, industrialist (ČKD)
- František Křižík, industrialist
- Ignác Šechtl, pioneer of photography (Šechtl and Voseček)
- Emil Škoda, industrialist (Škoda Works)

== Other ==
- Karel Barvitius (1864–1937), book and music publisher
- Eliška Bučková (born 1989), Miss Universe 2008 Top 15 finalist (Czech Republic placed for the second consecutive time)
- Jiří Buquoy (1781–1851), aristocrat
- Vlaada Chvatil (born 1971), board game designer
- Sophie Chotek (1868–1914), wife of Archduke Franz Ferdinand, also assassinated
- Tereza Fajksová (born 1989), (Miss Earth 2012)
- Josef Florian (1873–1941), book publisher
- Zdenek Konvalina (born 1979), ballet dancer
- Marian Korn (1914–1987), printmaker
- Taťána Kuchařová (born 1987), (Miss World 2006)
- Leopold Lojka (1886–1926), František Josef's driver during the assassination
- Victor Lustig (1890–1947), con artist
- Iveta Lutovská (born 1983), Miss Universe 2009 Top 10 finalist (Czech Republic placed for the third consecutive time)
- Jaroslav Malina (1937–2016), theatre scenographer
- Jan Opletal (1915–1939), student, shot by Germans
- Jan Palach (1948–1969), student, political activist
- Přemek Podlaha (1938–2014), TV personality
- Zdeňka Pokorná (1905–2007), teacher and political activist
- Anna Řeháková (1850–1937), teacher, writer and translator
- Eliška Řeháková (1846–1916), teacher, translator, journalist and suffragist
- Vladimír Remek (born 1948), cosmonaut
- Silvie Tomčalová, aka Silvia Saint (born 1976), adult film star
- Oskar Schindler (1908–1974), industrialist who saved 1200 Jewish lives in World War 2
- Bertha von Suttner (1843–1914), Nobel Peace Prize laureate
- Jan Zajíc (1950–1969), student, political activist, suicide
- Sultanah Nur Diana Petra (born 1988), Sultanah consort of the Malaysian State of Kelantan

== Fictional characters ==
- Jára Cimrman, fictional character of universal talents
- Josef Švejk, fictional soldier in World War I, main character of Jaroslav Hašek's novel The Good Soldier Švejk
- Tomas Vrbada, also known as Smoke, from the Mortal Kombat game series
- Mole
- Pat & Mat

== See also ==
- List of Czech Jews
- List of people by nationality
