= Romance pro křídlovku =

Book by František Hrubín

Romance pro křídlovku, cover of the 1992 edition. Illustration by Jiří Ptáček.

Romance pro křídlovku (in English: Romance for Bugle or Romance for Flugelhorn; in German: Romanze für ein Flügelhorn) is a lyrical epic poem written in 1961 by the Czech poet František Hrubín. It tells the story of a young boy who falls in love with a girl who runs a carousel. The book has been published internationally in Russian and German translations, as well as adapted for film and theatre. It is considered one of the most famous poems of Czech literature.

== Synopsis ==
The structure of the poem consists of 21 non-rhymed parts, with frequently recurring motifs. The plot is set in four different time periods: 27 and 28 August 1930, June 1933, June 1934, and an unspecified period of the 1940s/50s; however, the individual scenes do not follow chronologically. A young boy from a village meets a girl travelling with a carnival troupe visiting Bohemian villages and towns during traditional summer celebrations. They fall in love. The boy abandons his previous mistress Tonka, a rough and down-to-earth village girl, and focuses his thoughts and feelings on his new "unportrayable" subject of love, Terina. Simultaneously, he takes care of his old grandfather. Terina—who is still a minor—is watched by the carnival man Viktor, who often plays the opening melody from the song “Memory of Hercules Spa” (Băile Herculane) on his flugelhorn. In a short intermezzo (June 1934), Viktor tells the boy that Terina is not with the group, because she died of diphtheria. Years later, the boy tries to find her grave, but it no longer exists. He also meets Viktor in a pub and together they look for the dead girl, in vain.

== Background and analysis ==
František Hrubín wrote "Romance" between August and November 1961. He found inspiration for the setting of his poem in the villages of his favourite Benešov region. The poem is set in the village of Lešany, and also mentions other real places such as Netvořice and Chleby. The author's correspondence hints that the story was inspired by his own early loves; however, the autobiographical context is not clearly apparent in the work. According to Petr A. Bílek, a literary theorist and historian, "[Romance pro křídlovku] ... is not a nostalgic revocation of real events...". The story doesn't examine "how it actually happened"; instead, the author searched for "what can be said", and "how to tell this kind of story".

The story is presented in the first-person. The individual parts follow a non-linear narrative structure. Unlike in his previous poems, in Romance pro křídlovku Hrubín tells the story of an individual (the boy) in conflict with the world. Terina, the central character of the story, is depicted as an indefinable and inexpressible entity without firm contours. Her death sharply contrasts with the death of the boy's grandfather. While the grandfather dies naturally, in continuity with the time and his place in the world, the message of Terina's death is presented in a plain, brief, and definitive manner: "She died of diphtheria. In winter." ("Umřela na záškrt. V zimě.").

== Adaptations ==
In 1966, the poem was adapted for the film of the same name, directed by Otakar Vávra and starring Jaromír Hanzlík. The film received the Special Silver Prize at the 5th Moscow International Film Festival in 1967. The poem was also adapted for numerous theatre performances, including for the National Theatre in Prague.

== Literature ==
- Hrubín, František (1998). Romance pro křídlovku. Prague: Mladá fronta. ISBN 80-204-0717-0.
