= Josef Seger =

Czech organist, composer, and educator

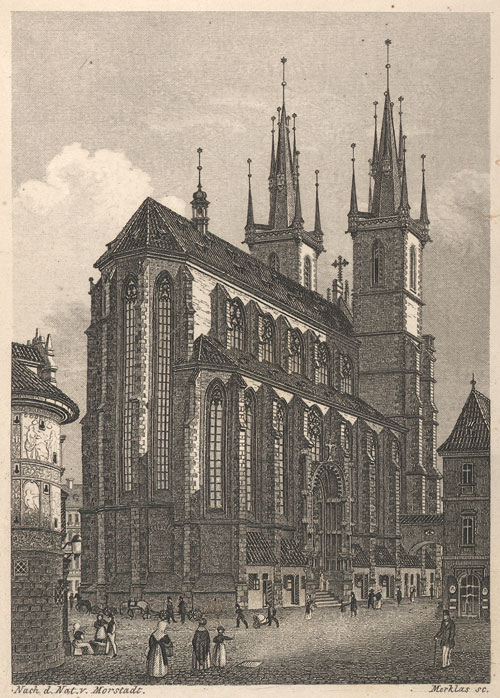
The Church of Our Lady in front of Týn in Prague, one of the two churches Seger worked at throughout most of life

Josef Seger (born Josef Ferdinand Norbert Segert, last name also Seeger or Seegr) (21 March 1716 – 22 April 1782) was an organist, composer, and educator from Bohemia. After graduating in philosophy from the Charles University in Prague and studying music under Bohuslav Matěj Černohorský, Jan Zach, and others, Seger became organist of two churches in Prague and remained there until his death.

An extremely prolific composer, Seger became one of the most important representatives of the Czech organ school of the 18th century. He was also an influential teacher: his pupils included Jan Antonín Koželuh and Josef Mysliveček, and his figured bass exercises served many generations of teachers.

== Life ==
Seger was born in Řepín, near Mělník, in Bohemia. He studied at the Jesuit Gymnasium in Prague and later graduated in philosophy at the Charles University. He also studied organ playing with Bohuslav Matěj Černohorský, counterpoint with Jan Zach and František Tůma, and, according to Dlabacž, figured bass with Felix Benda. Around 1741 Seger became organist to the Church of Our Lady in front of Týn and in 1745 he acquired a similar post at the Crusaders' church in Prague. He held both positions until his death. In 1781 Emperor Joseph II was sufficiently impressed with Seger's playing and offered the composer a court appointment, but Seger died in Prague in 1782 before the confirming document arrived.

None of Seger's compositions were published during his lifetime, but he was an important teacher and educator. His pupils included Karel Blažej Kopřiva, Jan Antonín Koželuh, Jan Křtitel Kuchař, Josef Mysliveček, and many other distinguished Bohemian composers and musicians. A few of Seger's pieces appeared in print in the 1790s; a selection of eight organ fugues was published by D. G. Türk in 1793. In 1803, J. Polt published Seger's ten preludes for organ, and a few more works followed in the next few decades. Particularly important was the publication of a portion of his figured bass exercises, which were used by teachers for decades after his death.

== Works ==
Seger was the most prolific Czech organ composer of the 18th century. Hundreds of preludes, fugues, toccatas and other organ pieces survive in manuscript copies, although the attribution to Seger of some of these works is problematic. Generally speaking, his preludes and fugues are short works (their length probably dictated by the limitations imposed by the Catholic liturgy), but they exhibit a fertile harmonic imagination and a perfect grasp of late Baroque counterpoint practice. He also composed masses, motets and psalm settings; all also dominated by archaic counterpoint.

== Selected works ==
=== Keyboard ===
- 8 Toccaten und Fugen, ed. D.G. Türk (Leipzig, 1793)
- 2 preludes, in Sammlung von Präludien, Fugen, ausgeführten Chorälen … von berühmten ältern Meistern, i (Leipzig, 1795)
- [10] Praeludien, ed. J. Polt (Prague, c. 1803)
- 4 preludes, 2 fugues, Toccata, Fughetta, in Fugen und Praeludien von älteren vaterländischen Compositoren, ed. Verein der Kunstfreunde für Kirchenmusik in Böhmen, i–ii (Prague, 1832)
- c. 70 pieces attributed to Seger in Museum für Orgel-Spieler, ed. [C.F. Pitsch] (Prague, 1832–1834)
- Numerous works in manuscript copies from the 18th and 19th century, 20th century publications, etc.

=== Vocal ===
==== Masses ====
- Missa quadragesimalis [in F major], for 4vv and organ
- Mass in D minor, for 4vv, 2 violins, 2 trombones, and organ
- Mass in D minor, for 4vv, 2 violins, and organ
- Missa choralis [in E-flat major], for 4vv, organ concertante (doubtful)

==== Other works ====
- Alma Redemptoris, for 4vv, string instrument ("violetta"), viola, and organ
- Audi filia, for 4vv and organ
- Ave regina, for 4vv, 2 violins, and organ
- Christus nobis natus est, for 4vv, strings, and organ
- Compieta (comprising Cum invocarem, In te Domine, Qui habitat, Ecce nunc, and Nunc dimittis), for 4vv, 2 violins, and organ
- Litaniae de sanctissimo sacramento, for 4vv, 2 violins, and organ

=== Other ===
- Around 200 figured bass lessons, known as Fundamenta pro organo, Generalbass-Übungsstücke, Orgel-Übungsstücke, etc.

== Editions ==
- Josef Ferdinand Norbert Seger: Composizioni per organo - Josef Ferdinand Norbert Seger, in: Musica antiqua Bohemica; 51, Band: 1 Preludi, toccate e fughe I-XXXVI. 1961, 111 p.
- Josef Ferdinand Norbert Seger: Composizioni per organo - Josef Ferdinand Norbert Seger, in: Musica antiqua Bohemica; 56, Band: 2 Preludi e fughe I-XXI. 1962. 126 p.
