= Martin Petiška =

Czech writer

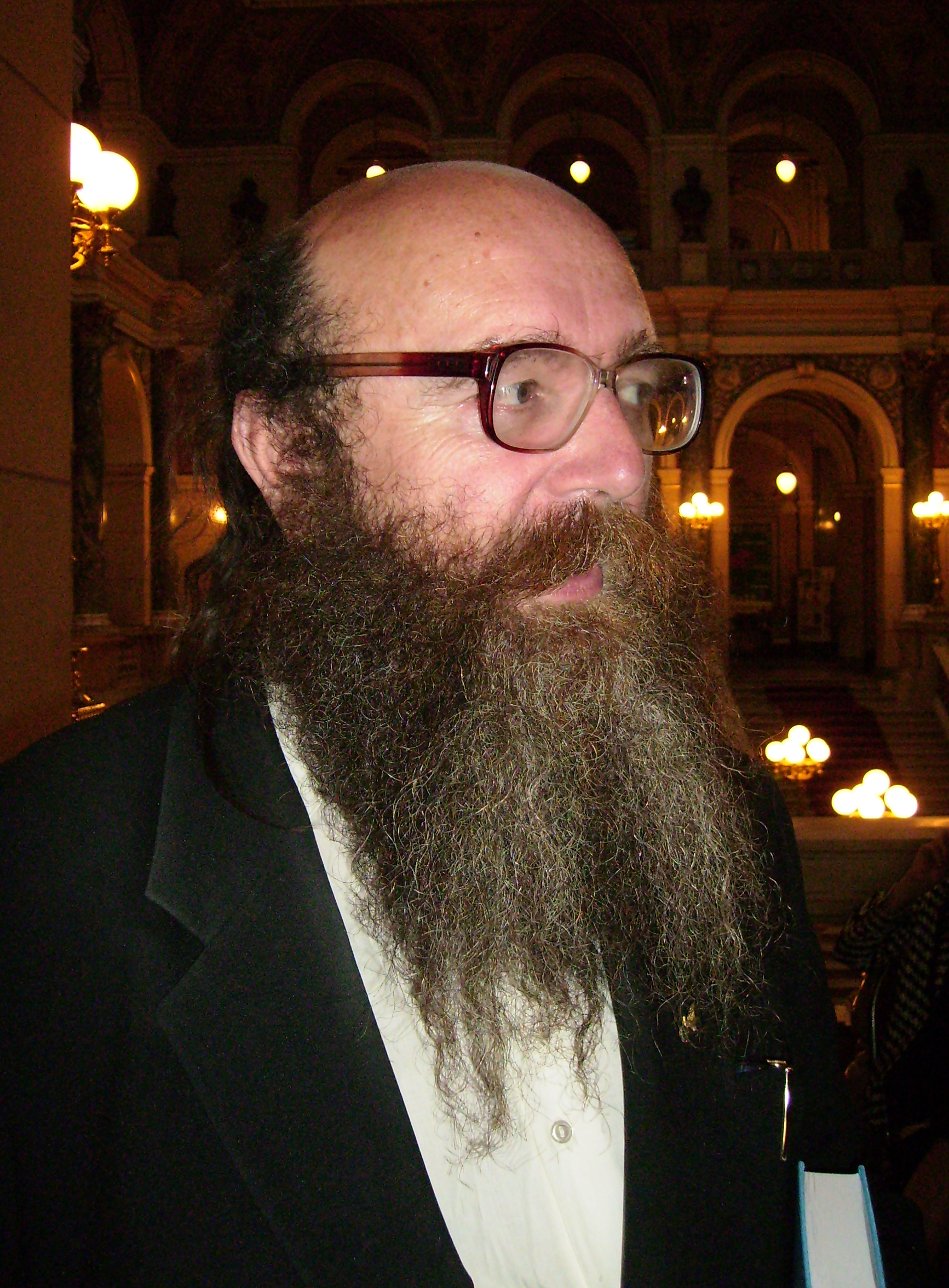
- Petiška in 2007
- Born: Prague, Czechoslovakia
- Education: Charles University
- Occupations: Writer, poet, playwright, publisher
- Parent: Eduard Petiška (father)
- Writing career
- Pen name: Eduard P. Martin

Martin Petiška (born 27 March 1951), also known by the pseudonyms Eduard Martin, Eduard P. Martin and Martin P. Edwards, is a Czech writer, poet, playwright and publisher. He is the son of the writer Eduard Petiška. He is the author of more than ninety titles.

The total circulation of his books has exceeded several hundred thousand copies, and they have been translated into multiple languages. His works are currently also being released as audiobooks and in electronic form in a selected edition of Martin Petiška's writings, some of which are available for free download.
