= Stolpersteine in Neratovice =

Memorial installations in Czech Republic

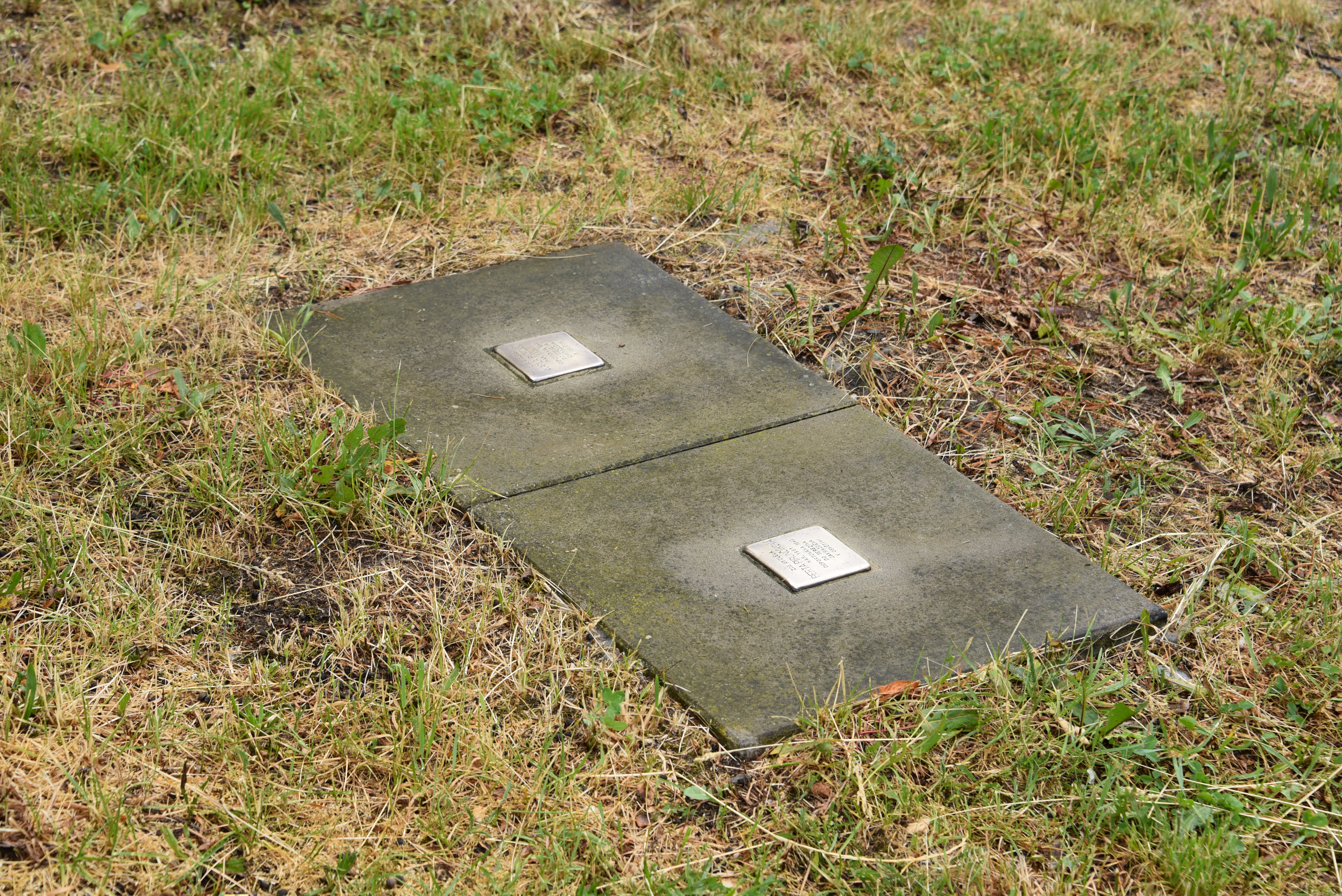
Stolpersteine for Berta Piruncikova and Karla Pickova

Stolpersteine is the German name for stumbling blocks collocated all over Europe by German artist Gunter Demnig. They memorialize the fate of the victims of Nazi Germany being murdered, deported, exiled or driven to suicide. The Stolpersteine in Neratovice, a town in the Central Bohemian Region (Czech: Středočeský kraj) of the present-day Czech Republic (formerly Czechoslovakia), were collocated in 2010.

The Czech Stolperstein project was initiated in 2008 by the Česká unie židovské mládeže (Czech Union of Jewish Youth) and was realized with the patronage of the Mayor of Prague. Generally, the stumbling blocks are posed in front of the building where the victims had their last self chosen residence. The name of the Stolpersteine in Czech is: Kameny zmizelých, stones of the disappeared.

== Neratovice ==
Stone	Inscription	Location	Life and death
	HERE LIVED; ADOLF HELLER; BORN 1919; DEPORTED 1943; TO THERESIENSTADT; MURDERED; IN AUSCHWITZ	Masarykova čp. 559 (formerly čp. 600)	Adolf Heller was born on 16 February 1919. His parents were Arnošt Heller and Emilie née Aron. He had four siblings, Ludvík (born 1910), Otto (born 1911), Bohumil (born 1912) and Marta (born 1922). On 13 January 1943, Adolf Heller, his father, two of his brothers and Alžběta Hellerová were deported with transport Cl from Mladá Boleslav to the Theresienstadt concentration camp. Their transport numbers were 292 to 296 of 552. One week later, on 20 January 1943, all five family members were deported to Auschwitz concentration camp with transport Cq. Their transport numbers were 1071, 1072 and 1088 to 1090 of 2,000. Adolf Heller was murdered there by the Nazi regime.
	HERE LIVED; ARNOŠT HELLER; BORN 1880; DEPORTED 1943; TO THERESIENSTADT; MURDERED; IN AUSCHWITZ	Masarykova čp. 559 (formerly čp. 600)	Arnošt Heller was born on 19 February 1880. He was married to Emilie née Aron, born on 28 February 1880 to Bohumil Aron and Alžběta née Picová. The couple had four sons, Ludvík (born 1910), Otto (born 1911) Bohumil (born on 19 February 1912) and Adolf (born 1919), and one daughter, Marta (born 1922). On 13 January 1943, Arnošt Heller, three of his sons and Alžběta Hellerová were deported with transport Cl from Mladá Boleslav to the Theresienstadt concentration camp. Their transport numbers were 292 to 296 of 552. One week later, on 20 January 1943, all five family members were deported to Auschwitz concentration camp with transport Cq. Their transport numbers were 1071, 1072 and 1088 to 1090 of 2,000. Arnošt Heller was murdered there by the Nazi regime. His son Bohumil Heller could survive the Shoah. He was married to Josefa née Rambousková (born 1915). The couple had two children. The fate of his daughter Marta is unknown.
	HERE LIVED; LUDVÍK HELLER; BORN 1910; DEPORTED 1943; TO THERESIENSTADT; MURDERED; IN AUSCHWITZ	Masarykova čp. 559 (formerly čp. 600)	Ludvík Heller was born on 9 March 1910. His parents were Arnošt Heller and Emilie née Aron. He had four siblings, Otto (born 1911), Bohumil (born 1912), Adolf (born 1919) and Marta (born 1922). On 13 January 1943, Ludvík Heller, his father, two of his brothers and Alžběta Hellerová were deported with transport Cl from Mladá Boleslav to the Theresienstadt concentration camp. Their transport numbers were 292 to 296 of 552. One week later, on 20 January 1943, all five family members were deported to Auschwitz concentration camp with transport Cq. Their transport numbers were 1071, 1072 and 1088 to 1090 of 2,000. Ludvík Heller was murdered there by the Nazi regime.
	HERE LIVED; OTTO HELLER; BORN 1911; DEPORTED 1943; TO THERESIENSTADT; MURDERED; IN AUSCHWITZ	Masarykova čp. 559 (formerly čp. 600)	Otto Heller was born on 28 April 1911. His parents were Arnošt Heller and Emilie née Aron. He had four siblings, Ludvík (born 1910), Bohumil (born 1912), Adolf (born 1919) and Marta (born 1922). On 13 January 1943, Otto Heller, his father, two of his brothers and Alžběta Hellerová were deported with transport Cl from Mladá Boleslav to the Theresienstadt concentration camp. Their transport numbers were 292 to 296 of 552. One week later, on 20 January 1943, all five family members were deported to Auschwitz concentration camp with transport Cq. Their transport numbers were 1071, 1072 and 1088 to 1090 of 2,000. Otto Heller was murdered there by the Nazi regime.
	HERE LIVED; ALŽBĚTA HELLEROVÁ; BORN 1893; DEPORTED 1943; TO THERESIENSTADT; MURDERED; IN AUSCHWITZ	Masarykova čp. 559 (formerly čp. 600)	Alžběta Hellerová, also Eliška, was born on 10 February 1893. She belonged to the Heller family and was probably the sister of Arnošt Heller. The last residence of the Heller family before deportation was in Neratovice. On 13 January 1943, she and four male family members (see above) were deported from Mladá Boleslav to Theresienstadt concentration camp with transport Cl. Their transport numbers were 292 to 296 of 552. On 20 January 1943, all five family members were deported to Auschwitz concentration camp with transport Cq. Their transport numbers were 1071, 1072 and 1088 to 1090 of 2,000. Alžběta Hellerová was murdered there by the Nazi regime. Also Arnošt, Ludvík, Otto and Adolf Heller were brought to death in Auschwitz.
	HERE LIVED; DR. MED. BEDŘICH; KLEMPERER; BORN 1900; DEPORTED 1944; TO THERESIENSTADT; MURDERED 1944; IN AUSCHWITZ	Nádražní čp. 80	Bedřich Klemperer was born on 12 May 1900 in Prague. His parents were Isidor Klemperer and Louise née Kohn. He had a brother, a sister and a half brother. He became a physician, achieved a doctorate and married Bedřiška née Grünhut, called also Friedericke. The couple had two children: son Pinkas (also Peter, born 1926) and daughter Helene (born 1928). His wife died already in 1931. Bedřich Klemperer got to know Ela née Taussigová and married her. The couple had a daughter, Asta (born in 1936 or 1937). Ela Klemperer did also take care of the two older children. After the German invasion, his second wife succeeded in escaping to Iran with the help of the "Société Iranienne Skoda" (SIS) — together with all three children. Bedřich Klemperer stayed in Neratovice. From the summer of 1939 on, he was no longer allowed to practice as a physician and was assigned to work at the Neratovice station, after which he had to work in the coal-mine of Oslavany, the Rosicko-oslavanská pánev. On 8 September 1944, Dr. Bedřich Klemperer was deported from Prague to Theresienstadt concentration camp by transport Ei. His transport number was 3 of 13. From here he was deported to Auschwitz on 28 September 1944 by transport Ek. His transport number was 341 of 2,500. Bedřich Klemperer has not survived the Shoah. Immediately after arrival in Auschwitz, he was murdered in a gas chamber. His sister Ella was killed in Theresienstadt. His brother Otto and his half brother Jiří and their families could all survive. His wife and all three children survived the Shoah in emigration. His daughter Helene married Slávek Březina and had at least one child. She died in 1994. In 1999, his son Pinkas Klemperer, who at the time lived in Tel Aviv, submitted the report on the death of his father to Yad Vashem. He was married and had two children. He died in 2002. His daughter Asta was also married and thereafter was named Mojžíšová. She was present when the Stolperstein for her father was collocated in 2010.
	HERE LIVED; GUSTAV NEUMANN; BORN 1883; DEPORTED 1943; TO THERESIENSTADT; MURDERED; IN AUSCHWITZ	Nádražní čp. 80	Gustav Neumann was born on 19 August 1883 in Mlékojedy. His parents were Eduard Neumann and Maria née Grab. He was married to Olga née Neumann. Their last residence before deportation was in Neratovice. On 13 January 1943, he and his wife were deported with transport Cl from Mladá Boleslav to Theresienstadt concentration camp. Their transport numbers were 251 and 252 of 552. On 20 January 1943, both were deported with transport Cq, train DA 101 to Auschwitz concentration camp. Their transport numbers were 679 and 680 of 2,000. Gustav Neumann and Olga Neumannová did not survive the Shoah.
	HERE LIVED; OLGA NEUMANNOVÁ; BORN 1888; DEPORTED 1943; TO THERESIENSTADT; MURDERED; IN AUSCHWITZ	Nádražní čp. 80	Olga Neumannová née Neumann was born on 15 May 1888 in Litol. Her parents were Gustav Neumann und Emilie née Reiner. She was married to Gustav Neumann. Their last residence before deportation was in Neratovice. On 13 January 1943, she and her husband were deported with transport Cl from Mladá Boleslav to Theresienstadt concentration camp. Their transport numbers were 251 and 252 of 552. On 20 January 1943, both were deported with transport Cq, train DA 101 to Auschwitz concentration camp. Their transport numbers were 679 and 680 of 2,000. Olga Neumannová and Gustav Neumann did not survive the Shoah.
	HERE LIVED; ARNOŠT OPLATKA; BORN 1883; DEPORTED 1943; TO THERESIENSTADT; MURDERED; IN AUSCHWITZ	Kpt. Jaroše 236	Arnošt Oplatka was born on 18 March 1883. His last residence before deportation was in Neratovice 236. On 13 January 1943, he was deported with transport Cl from Mladá Boleslav to Theresienstadt concentration camp. His transport number was 222 of 552. On 6 September 1943, he was deported with transport Dm to Auschwitz concentration camp. His transport number was 3726. Arnošt Oplatka did not survive the Shoah.
	HERE LIVED; KARLA PICKOVÁ; BORN 1869; DEPORTED 1943; TO THERESIENSTADT; MURDERED; ~~IN AUSCHWITZ~~	Berty Pirunčíkové (next to nr. 29)	Kateřina Picková, erroneously called Karla Picková on the stumbling block, born on 6 April 1869 in Řepín in the Mělník District. She was the sister of Berta Pirunčíková (see below). She was single and a housewife. The two sisters were deported on 13 January 1943 with the transport Cl from Mladá Boleslav to Theresienstadt concentration camp. Their transport numbers were 286 and 287 of 552. There she died one week later, on 21 January 1943. According to the death certificate issued by Dr. Max Bergmann the cause of her death was a heart muscle modification. The Stolperstein inscription claims that she was murdered in Auschwitz. This is incorrect. Her sister was deported to Auschwitz on the day before her death and later-on murdered at an unknown date by the Nazi regime.
	HERE LIVED; BERTA PIRUNČÍKOVÁ; BORN 1881; DEPORTED 1943; ZO THERESIENSTADT; MURDERED; IN AUSCHWITZ	Berty Pirunčíkové (next to nr. 29)	Berta Pirunčíková née Picková was born on 15 February 1881. She had a sister named Kateřina Picková (see above). The two sisters were deported on 13 January 1943 with the transport Cl from Mladá Boleslav to Theresienstadt concentration camp. Their transport numbers were 286 and 287 of 552. One week later, on 20 January 1943, she was deported by transport Cq to Auschwitz concentration camp. Her transport number was 1176 of 2,000. Nearly all Jews of this transport, 1,999, were murdered in the course of the Shoah. Berta Pirunčíková was one of the victims. On the day after her deportation, her sister, who had remained in Theresienstadt, died.
	HERE LIVED; OTTO POLLAK; BORN 1882; DEPORTED 1943; TO THERESIENSTADT; MURDERED; IN AUSCHWITZ	V Lesíčkách čp. 206	Otto Pollak was born on 1 March 1882. He was married to Helena née Rosenfeldová (see below). The couple had at least one son, Josef, born on 25 January 1920 in Hronov. He and his wife were deported on 13 January 1943 with the transport Cl from Mladá Boleslav to Theresienstadt concentration camp. Their transport numbers were 267 and 268 of 552. Their son was already there, having been deported by transport AAl from Prague to Theresienstadt on 2 July 1942. His transport number was 501 of 1,005. One week later, on 20 January 1943, all three family members were deported by transport Cq to Auschwitz concentration camp. Their transport numbers were 127, 1976 and 1977 of 2,000. All three lost their lives in the course of the Shoah as did 1,996 other Jews of this transport. Only one could survive.
	HERE LIVED; HELENA POLLAKOVÁ; BORN 1890; DEPORTED 1943; TO THERESIENSTADT; MURDERED; IN AUSCHWITZ	V Lesíčkách čp. 206	Helena Pollaková née Rosenfeldová was born on 19 September 1890. She was married to Otto Pollak. The couple had at least one son, Josef, born on 25 January 1920 in Hronov. She and her husband were deported on 13 January 1943 with the transport Cl from Mladá Boleslav to Theresienstadt concentration camp. Their transport numbers were 267 and 268 of 552. Their son was already there, having been deported from Prague to Theresienstadt on 2 July 1942. One week later, on 20 January 1943, all three family members were deported by transport Cq to Auschwitz concentration camp. Their transport numbers were 127 for Josef and 1976 and 1977 for his parents of 2,000. It is not known if the family members met in the overcrowded camp. Helena Pollaková, her husband and their son were all murdered by the Nazi regime.
	HERE LIVED; VILÉM STEIN; BORN 1867; DEPORTED 1943; TO THERESIENSTADT; MURDERED; IN AUSCHWITZ	Nádražní čp. 103	Vilém Stein was born on 28 October 1867. He was married to Elsa (see below. The couple had two daughters: Hana (born 1919) and Vera (born 1927). On 13 January 1943, parents and daughters were deported with transport Cl from Mladá Boleslav to Theresienstadt concentration camp. Their transport numbers were 282 to 285 of 552. In Theresienstadt, the family members were separated. Hana was deported to Auschwitz concentration camp on 20 January 1943, Věra on 6 September 1943, Vilém Stein and Elsa Steinová on 15 December 1943. Her number on transport Dr to Auschwitz was 2114. The whole family was murdered in the course of the Shoah.
	HERE LIVED; ELSA STEINOVÁ; BORN 1886; DEPORTED 1943; TO THERESIENSTADT; MURDERED; IN AUSCHWITZ	Nádražní čp. 103	Elsa Steinová, also Alzebta or Elizabeta, was born on 2 October 1886. She was married to Vilém Stein. The couple had two daughters: Hana (born 1919) and Vera (born 1927). On 13 January 1943, parents and daughters were deported with transport Cl from Mladá Boleslav to Theresienstadt concentration camp. Their transport numbers were 282 to 285 of 552. In Theresienstadt, the family members were separated. Hana was deported to Auschwitz concentration camp on 20 January 1943, Věra on 6 September 1943, Vilém Stein and Elsa Steinová on 15 December 1943. His number on transport Dr to Auschwitz was 2129. The whole family was murdered in the course of the Shoah.
	HERE LIVED; HANA STEINOVÁ; BORN 1919; DEPORTED 1943; TO THERESIENSTADT; MURDERED; IN AUSCHWITZ	Nádražní čp. 103	Hana Steinová was born on 14 April 1919 in Plzeň. Her parents were Vilém Stein and Elsa Steinová (see above). On 13 January 1943, she, her parents and her sister Věra were deported with transport Cl from Mladá Boleslav to Theresienstadt concentration camp. Their transport numbers were 282 to 285 of 552. In Theresienstadt, the family members were separated. Hana was deported to Auschwitz concentration camp on 20 January 1943, Věra on 6 September 1943 and their parents on 15 December 1943. Hana Steinová's number on transport Cq to Auschwitz was 544 of 1,999. The whole family was murdered in the course of the Shoah.
	HERE LIVED; VĚRA STEINOVÁ; BORN 1927; DEPORTED 1943; TO THERESIENSTADT; MURDERED; IN AUSCHWITZ	Nádražní čp. 103	Věra Steinová was born on 11 April 1927. Her parents were Vilém Stein and Elsa Steinová (see above). On 13 January 1943, she, her parents and her sister Hana were deported with transport Cl from Mladá Boleslav to Theresienstadt concentration camp. Their transport numbers were 282 to 285 of 552. In Theresienstadt, the family members were separated. Hana was deported to Auschwitz concentration camp on 20 January 1943, Věra on 6 September 1943 and their parents on 15 December 1943. Věra Steinová's number on transport Dm to Auschwitz was 3731. The whole family was murdered in the course of the Shoah.

== Dates of collocations ==
The Stolpersteine in Neratovice were all collocated in 2010:

- 13 June 2010: Nádražní 80 (Bedřich Klemperer)

== See also ==
- List of cities by country that have stolpersteine
- Stolpersteine in the Czech Republic
