= Václav Švejcar =

Czech artist

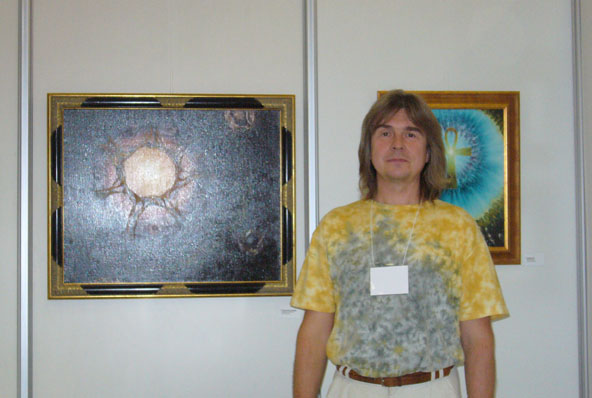
- Václav Švejcar
- Born: 12 July 1962; Písek, Czech Republic
- Died: 25 December 2008 (aged 46); Písek, Czech Republic
- Known for: Painting
- Website: www.vaclavsvejcar.cz

Václav Švejcar (1962–2008) was a Czech artist and author of meditative images.

== Exhibits ==
From 1991, Václav Švejcar has done many exhibitions throughout the Czech Republic, as well as in New York City, and participated in several joint exhibitions in Germany (1990), Austria (1996, 1997and 2004) and Florida in the United States (2006).

== Gallery ==
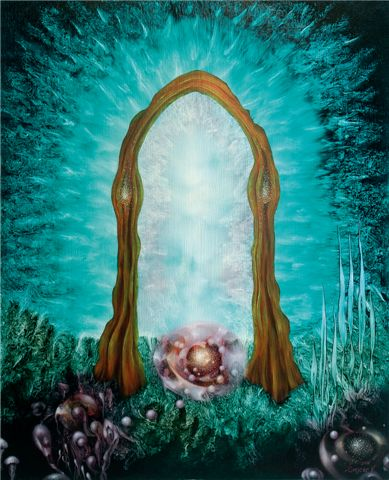

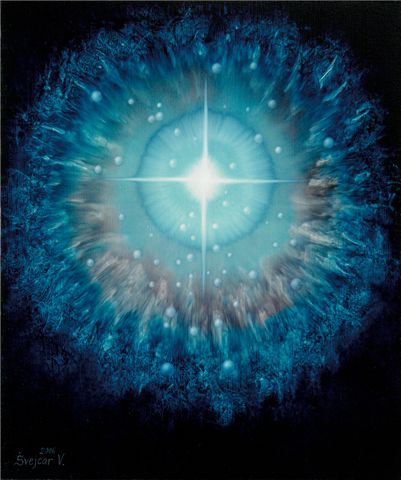

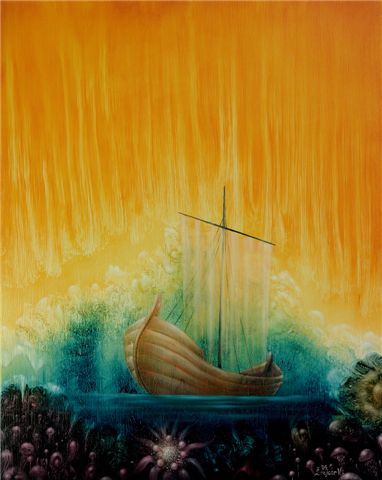

== See also ==
- List of Czech photographers
