= Romance for Bugle (film) =

1967 film

- Directed by: Otakar Vávra
- Written by: František Hrubín; Otakar Vávra
- Starring: Zuzana Cigánová
- Cinematography: Andrej Barla
- Release date: 3 March 1967
- Running time: 86 minutes
- Country: Czechoslovakia
- Language: Czech

Romance for Bugle (Czech: Romance pro křídlovku) is a 1967 Czechoslovak drama film directed by Otakar Vávra. It was entered into the 5th Moscow International Film Festival where it won the Special Silver Prize. It is based on the lyrical epic poem of the same name written in 1961 by František Hrubín.

== Cast ==
- Zuzana Cigánová
- Věra Crháková
- Jaromír Hanzlík
- Miriam Kantorková
- Štefan Kvietik
- Karel Roden as Funeral Agent
- Jaroslav Rozsíval
- Marie Stampachová
- Jiří Štancl
- Janusz Strachocki
- Václav Švec
- Július Vašek
