= Jan Matzal Troska =

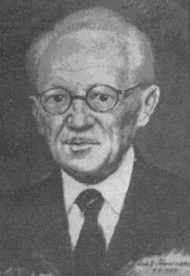
Jan Matzal

Jan Matzal (3 August 1881 in Valašské Klobouky, Moravia - 3 September 1961 in Prague), known under pen names J. M. Troska and Jan Merfort, was a Czech writer.

After his studies Jan Matzal worked in the Škoda Works and other industrial companies. During World War I he was sent to the front because of attempt to cover up a sabotage by factory workers. After the war Matzal lived in Yugoslavia (1921-1926), then returned to Czechoslovakia. He obtained a disability pension at the age of 49 after a lifetime of living with Ménière's disease. During years 1932–1949, he spent his time by writing.

== Writer ==
He published his first novel, Boží soud (1935, about village life), under the pen name Jan Merfort. Later (1936 – 1943) he used the pen name J. M. Troska (Troska means a ruin in Czech, to point out his physical suffering) and published mostly science fiction novels. In these novels Matzal freely ignored rules of physics, used very simple and naïve language, and employed dramatic situations and many new ideas of his time (powerful robots, huge underground cities constructed inside a Hollow Earth, nuclear weapons, automatically guided missiles, interplanetary travels, cosmic empires, aliens and telepathy). His books were very popular among children and teenagers: they are similar to fairy tales, where characters are crystal clear and the good always wins.

The books were illustrated by Zdeněk Burian (covers) and Jiří Wowk. Some of his books were reprinted in 1960–70 (illustrated by Miloš Novák) and 1990–2000 (illustrated by Teodor Rotrekl).

== Works ==
- Captain Nemo I. Nemo's empire. / Kapitán Nemo I. Nemova říše. / 1939. /
- Captain Nemo I. Nemo's world. / Kapitán Nemo I. Nemův svět. / 1941. / (censored edition)
- Captain Nemo II. Commands from ether. / Kapitán Nemo II. Rozkazy z éteru. / 1939. /
- Captain Nemo III. Invisible army. / Kapitán Nemo III. Neviditelná armáda. / 1939. /
- Rays of life and death. / Paprsky života a smrti. / 1937/1938. /
- Hell in paradise. / Peklo v ráji. / 1941. /
- Gun of peace / Pistole míru. / 1941./
- Planet Leon I. / Planeta Leon I. / 1943. /
- Planet Leon II. / Planeta Leon II. / 1944. /
- Ruler of depths of sea. / Vládce mořských hlubin. / 1942.
- Rulers of universe. / Vládcové vesmíru. / 1947. /
- Mysterious island. / Záhadný ostrov. / 1941. /
- Fight with heaven I. Deathbringer. / Zápas s nebem I. Smrtonoš. / 1940. /
- Fight with heaven II. Godlike. / Zápas s nebem II. Podobni bohům. / 1940. /
- Fight with heaven III. Scourge of heavens. / Zápas s nebem III. Metla nebes. / 1941. /

== Trivia ==
A main-belt asteroid 17776 Troska discovered in 1998 by Czech astronomer Petr Pravec from the Ondřejov Observatory was named after the writer. The name was chosen at the meeting of sci-fi fans Avalcon in Chotěboř on May 5, 2001.
