= Zápas s nebem =

1940 novel by Jan Matzal

1970 edition (publ. Profil)

Zápas s nebem is a Czech science fiction novel, written by J. M. Troska. It was first published in 1941.
