= Trpín (Svitavy District) =

- Municipality
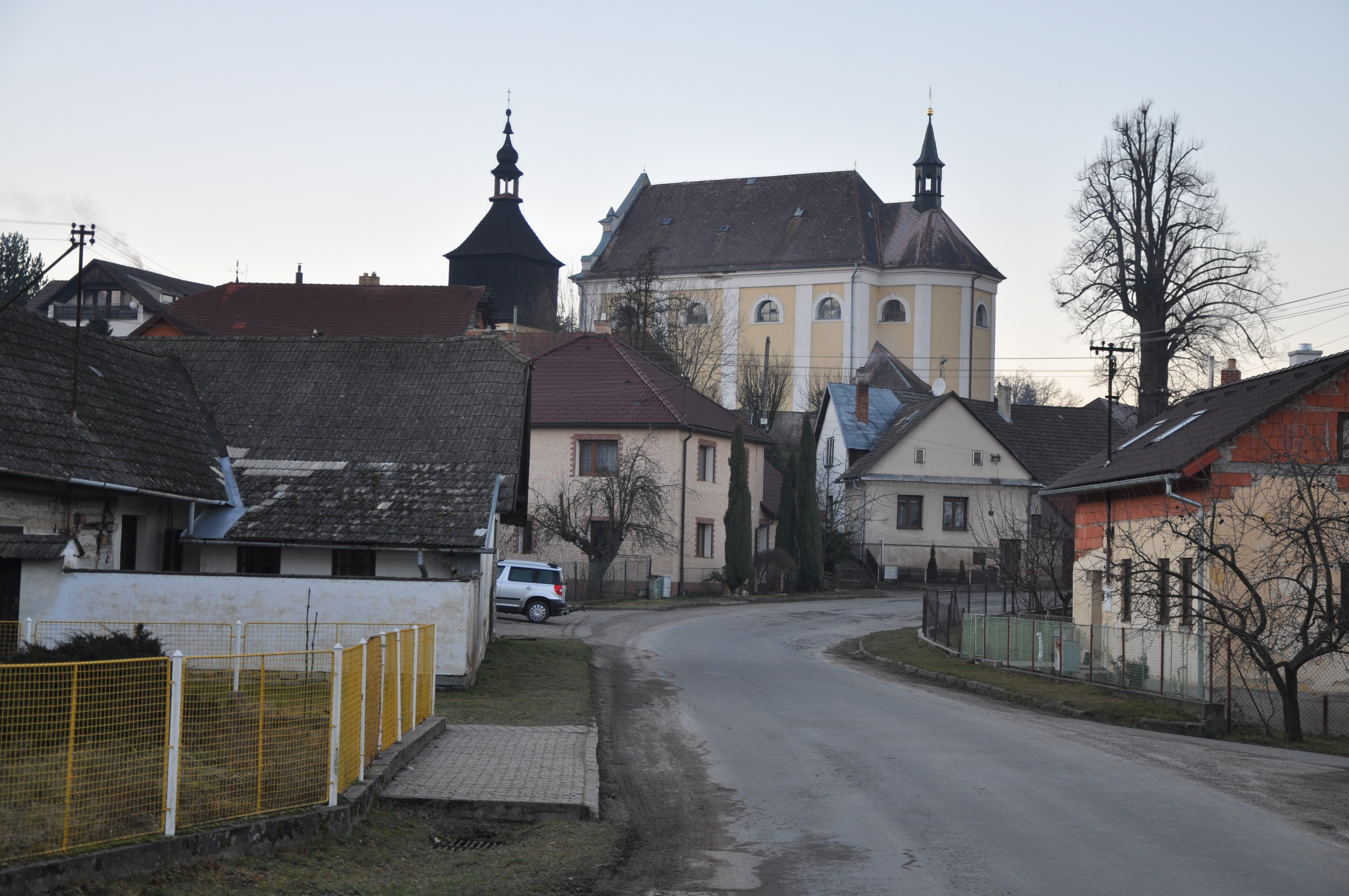
- Church of Saint Wenceslaus

- Flag Coat of arms

- Location in the Czech Republic
- Coordinates: 49°35′43″N 16°24′6″E
- Country: Czech Republic
- Region: Pardubice
- District: Svitavy
- First mentioned: 1349

Area
  - Total: 12.49 km^{2} (4.82 sq mi)
- Elevation: 598 m (1,962 ft)

Population (2026-01-01)
  - Total: 449
  - Density: 35.9/km^{2} (93.1/sq mi)
- Time zone: UTC+1 (CET)
  - Summer (DST): UTC+2 (CEST)
- Postal codes: 569 74, 569 92
- Website: www.trpin.cz

Trpín is a municipality and village in Svitavy District in the Pardubice Region of the Czech Republic. It has about 400 inhabitants.

== Administrative division ==
Trpín consists of two municipal parts (in brackets population according to the 2021 census):

- Trpín (357)
- Hlásnice (55)

== Etymology ==
The name Trpín is derived from the personal name Trpa, meaning "Trpa's (court)".

== Geography ==
Trpín is located about 18 kilometres (11 mi) south of Svitavy and 44 km (27 mi) north of Brno. It lies in the Upper Svratka Highlands. The highest point is the hill Panský vrch at 700 m (2,300 ft) above sea level.

== History ==
The first written mention of Trpín is from 1349. The village of Hlásnice was first mentioned in 1437.

== Demographics ==
Historical population

| Year | Pop. | ±% |
|---|---|---|
| 1869 | 966 | — |
| 1880 | 956 | −1.0% |
| 1890 | 900 | −5.9% |
| 1900 | 951 | +5.7% |
| 1910 | 928 | −2.4% |

| Year | Pop. | ±% |
|---|---|---|
| 1921 | 894 | −3.7% |
| 1930 | 893 | −0.1% |
| 1950 | 661 | −26.0% |
| 1961 | 681 | +3.0% |
| 1970 | 606 | −11.0% |

| Year | Pop. | ±% |
|---|---|---|
| 1980 | 561 | −7.4% |
| 1991 | 494 | −11.9% |
| 2001 | 440 | −10.9% |
| 2011 | 421 | −4.3% |
| 2021 | 412 | −2.1% |

Source: Censuses

== Transport ==
There are no railways or major roads passing through the municipality.

== Sights ==
The main landmark of Trpín is the Church of Saint Wenceslaus. It was consecrated in 1689, but the construction was not completed until 1720. There is a wooden belfry next to the church.

== Notable people ==
- Otakar Sedloň (1885–1973), painter

== Twin towns – sister cities ==
Trpín is twinned with:

- Palkonya, Hungary
