= Helena Zmatlíková =

Czech artist (1923–2005)

- Born: Helena Wehrbergerová; 19 November 1923; Prague, Czechoslovakia
- Died: 4 April 2005 (aged 81); Czech Republic
- Known for: illustrations of children's books

Helena Zmatlíková (19 November 1923 – 4 April 2005) was a Czech illustrator, especially of children's books. She is among the most published Czech artist in the 20th century. For her works she received numerous awards. She also participated in the Expo 58 world exhibition.

== Life ==
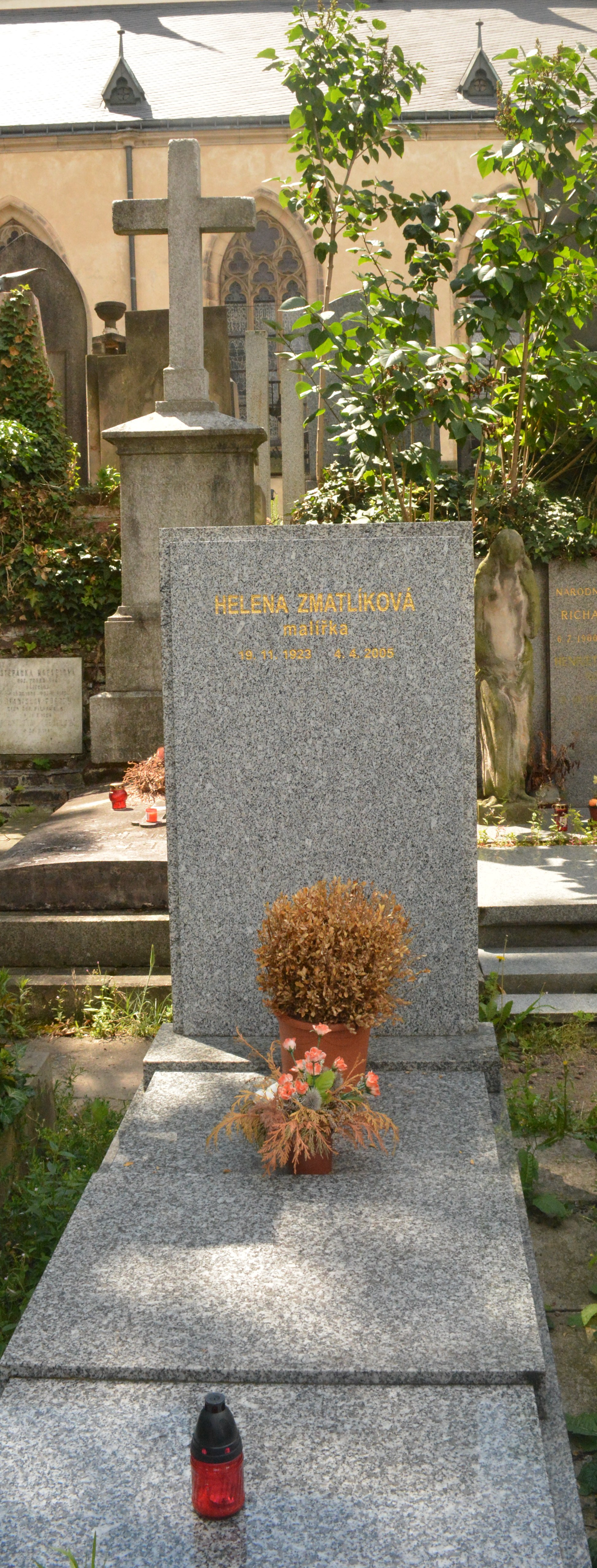
Zmatlíková's grave at the Vyšehrad Cemetery

She was born Helena Wehrbergerová on 19 November 1923 in Prague. Already at the age of 14, she responded to an advertisement looking for a fashion illustrator and succeeded. She first studied at the private Ukrainian Academy, then transferred to the Rotter's School of Drawing and Advertising Graphics, and completed her studies at the Officina Pragensis School. At the age of 18, she married for the first time. During the marriage, which lasted seven years, the son Ivan was born to her.

During World War II, she worked for the Melantrich publishing house. She created fashion drawings, illustrations for stories, and colouring books. After the war, she became an illustrator at the State Publishing House of Children's Books (later known as Albatros). In 1951, she married the painter Zdenek Seydl, but they divorced twenty years later.

Zmatlíková died on 4 April 2025. She succumbed to the consequences of a stroke. She was buried at the Vyšehrad Cemetery in Prague.

== Work ==
Zmatlíková's illustrations are considered to be tender and cheerful. Publicist Jaroslav Císař once wrote about Zmatlíková: "Her handwriting is characterised by a solid contour line and by a drawing that shines with bright colours and evokes a feeling of something familiar and optimistic."

Zmatlíková's illustrations, which appeared in books published all over the world in more than 20 languages, have been popular with children for decades. She illustrated about 250 books. According to the number of books published with her illustrations, she was the 7th most published artist in Czechoslovakia/Czech Republic in the 20th century. The best known of these include:

- Eduard Petiška's books
- Bohumil Říha's Honzíkova cesta and O letadélku Káněti
- František Hrubín's Paleček
- Karel Jaromír Erben's České pohádky
- Jan Drda's Městečko na dlani
- Ludvík Aškenazy's Putování za švestkovou vůní
- Božena Němcová's Bylo nebylo
- Josef Kolář's Z deníku kocoura modroočka
- Jiří Žáček's alphabet book
- Czech edition of Astrid Lindgren's The Six Bullerby Children
- Czech edition of Antoine de Saint-Exupéry's The Little Prince
- Czech edition of Carlo Collodi's The Adventures of Pinocchio

The most successful work for adults is the illustrations for Roark Bradford's Ol' Man Adam an' His Chillun.

During her lifetime, Zmatlíková did not have many exhibitions, which continues even after her death, as her illustrations are still part of currently published books. Zmatlíková considered the best presentation to be the book itself.

== Family ==
Her son Ivan Zmatlík founded the Artur publishing house, which publishes books with Zmatlíková's illustrations and takes care of copyrights to her illustrations. Zmatlíková's nephew is Pavel Rychetský, a lawyer and politician.

== Honours ==
Zmatlíková participated in the Expo 58 world exhibition, where she was awarded the Gold Medal.

On 19 November 2013, Google celebrated her 90th birthday with a Google Doodle.

She has won the Marie Majerová Award three times. It is an award for the best works of children's literature published in the previous year.
