= Netvořice =

- Market town
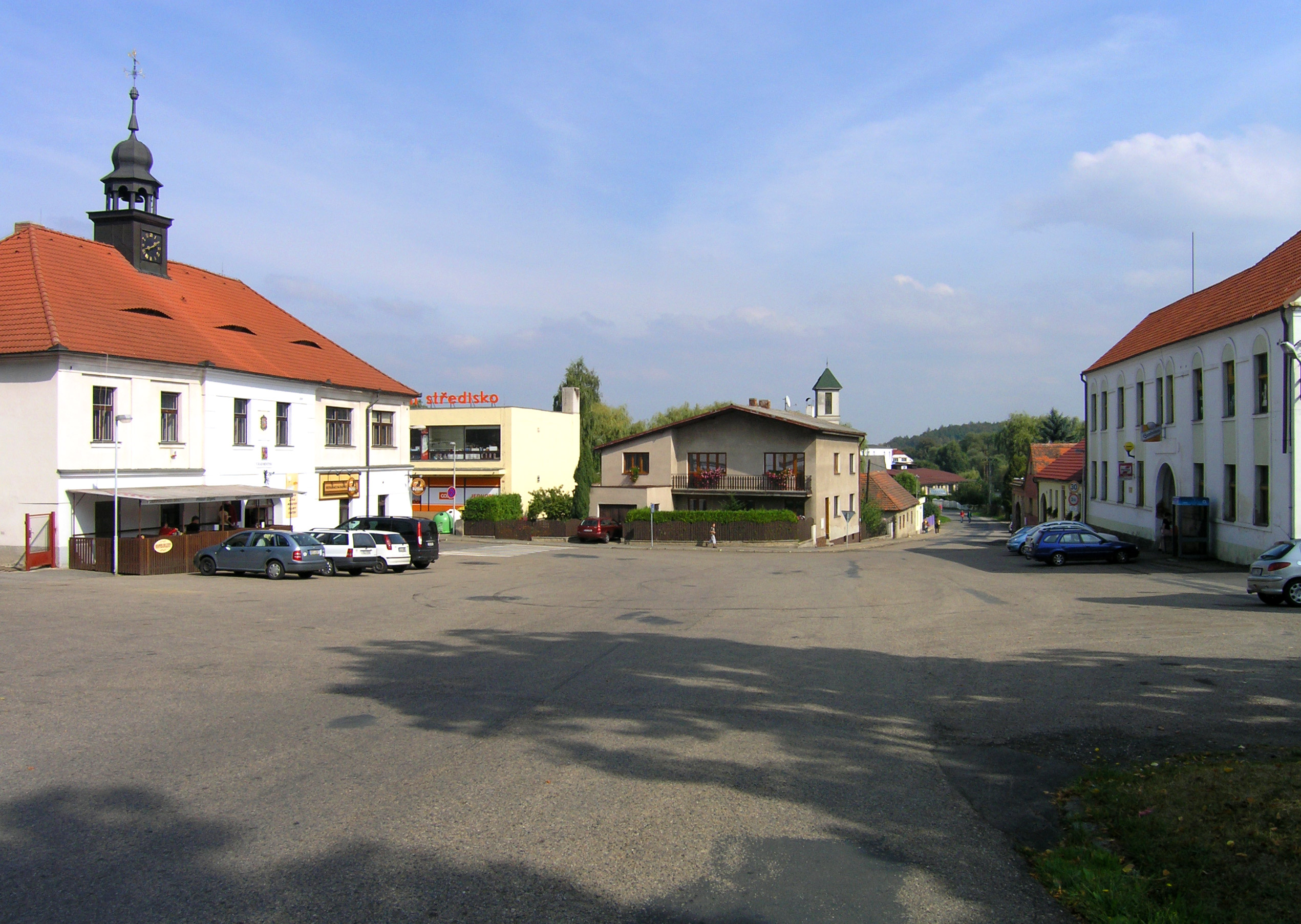
- The square Mírové náměstí

- Location in the Czech Republic
- Coordinates: 49°48′57″N 14°31′6″E
- Country: Czech Republic
- Region: Central Bohemian
- District: Benešov
- First mentioned: 1205

Area
  - Total: 17.88 km^{2} (6.90 sq mi)
- Elevation: 352 m (1,155 ft)

Population (2026-01-01)
  - Total: 1,211
  - Density: 67.73/km^{2} (175.4/sq mi)
- Time zone: UTC+1 (CET)
  - Summer (DST): UTC+2 (CEST)
- Postal code: 257 44
- Website: www.netvorice.cz

Netvořice (Czech pronunciation: [ˈnɛtvor̝ɪtsɛ]) is a market town in Benešov District in the Central Bohemian Region of the Czech Republic. It has about 1,200 inhabitants.

== Administrative division ==
Netvořice consists of seven municipal parts (in brackets population according to the 2021 census):

- Netvořice (997)
- Dunávice (61)
- Lhota (26)
- Maskovice (29)
- Radějovice (6)
- Tuchyně (18)
- Všetice (35)

== Etymology ==
The name is derived from the personal name Netvor, meaning "the village of Netvor's people".

== Geography ==
Netvořice is located about 12 kilometres (7 mi) west of Benešov and 23 km (14 mi) south of Prague. It lies in the Benešov Uplands. The highest point is the hill Holý at 516 m (1,693 ft) above sea level. The brook Brejlovský potok flows through the market town.

== History ==
The first written mention of Netvořice is in a deed of King Ottokar I from 1205. From 1683 to 1918, Netvořice was owned by the Metropolitan Chapter at Saint Vitus as part of the Lešany estate.

== Demographics ==
Historical population

Year	Pop.	±%
1869	1,400	—
1880	1,451	+3.6%
1890	1,320	−9.0%
1900	1,326	+0.5%
1910	1,329	+0.2%

Year	Pop.	±%
1921	1,164	−12.4%
1930	1,195	+2.7%
1950	875	−26.8%
1961	998	+14.1%
1970	890	−10.8%

Year	Pop.	±%
1980	934	+4.9%
1991	1,113	+19.2%
2001	1,064	−4.4%
2011	1,130	+6.2%
2021	1,172	+3.7%

Source: Censuses

== Transport ==
There are no railways or major roads passing through the municipality.

== Sights ==
The main landmark of Netvořice is the Church of the Assumption of the Virgin Mary. The original church was built in the 14th or 15th century. It was replaced by the current Baroque building in 1747–1753.
