= Kapitán Nemo =

1939 novel by Jan Matzal Troska

Kapitán Nemo is a Czech science fiction novel, written by J. M. Troska. It was first published in 1939.

== Plot ==
Adventurers seeking the location of the legendary Atlantis are captured by Captain Nemo, the antihero from Jules Verne's 1870 novel, Twenty Thousand Leagues Under the Seas. Nemo has established an underground empire on the ruins of the lost civilization and has an immense army of robots.
