= Řepín =

- Municipality
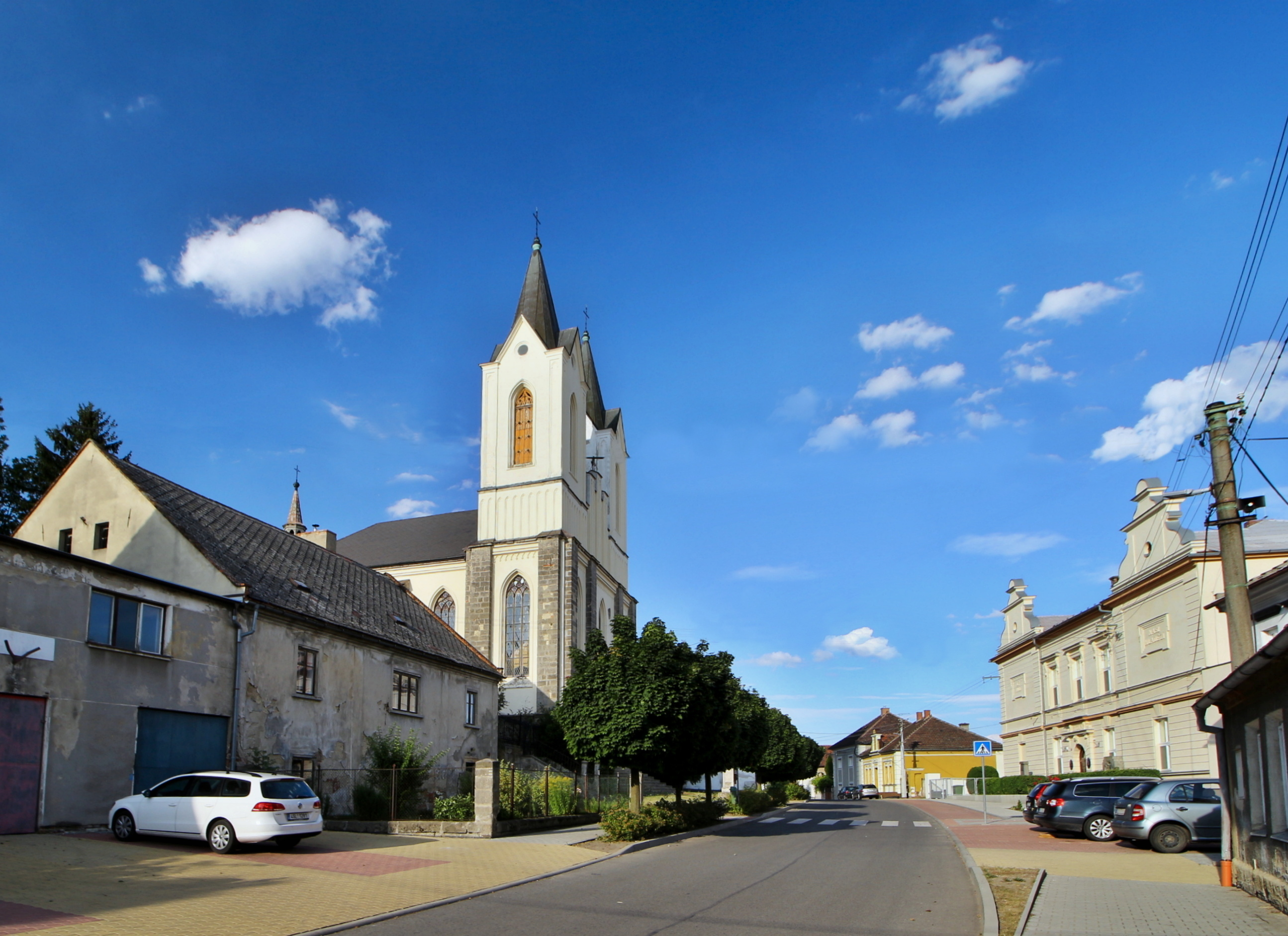
- Centre with the Church of Our Lady of the Rosary

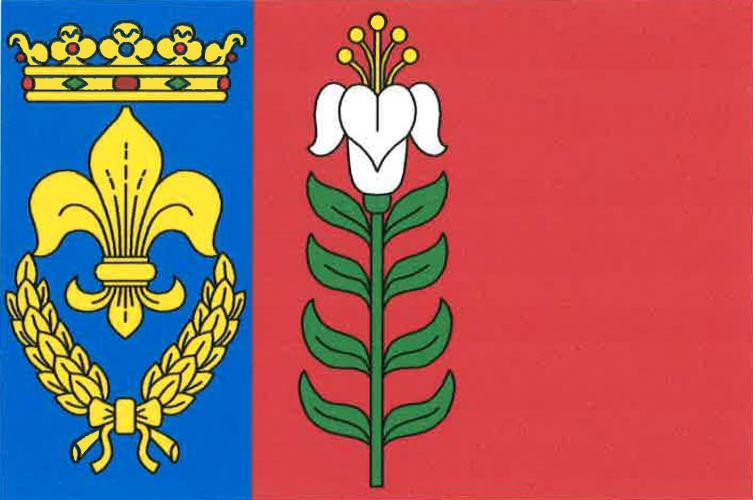
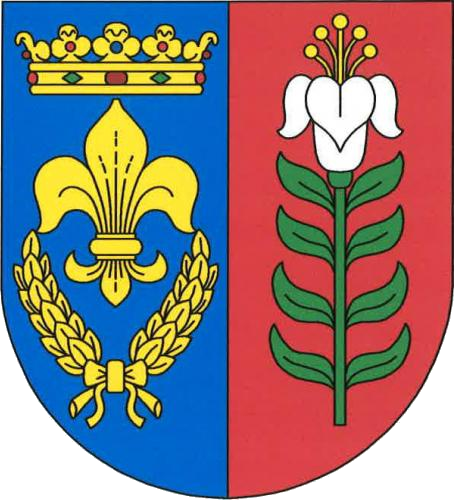
- Flag Coat of arms

- Location in the Czech Republic
- Coordinates: 50°22′0″N 14°38′5″E
- Country: Czech Republic
- Region: Central Bohemian
- District: Mělník
- First mentioned: 1207

Area
  - Total: 15.32 km^{2} (5.92 sq mi)
- Elevation: 295 m (968 ft)

Population (2026-01-01)
  - Total: 721
  - Density: 47.1/km^{2} (122/sq mi)
- Time zone: UTC+1 (CET)
  - Summer (DST): UTC+2 (CEST)
- Postal code: 277 33
- Website: www.repin.cz

Řepín is a municipality and village in Mělník District in the Central Bohemian Region of the Czech Republic. It has about 700 inhabitants.

== Administrative division ==
Řepín consists of two municipal parts (in brackets population according to the 2021 census):

- Řepín (550)
- Živonín (133)

== Demographics ==
Historical population
Year	Pop.	±%
1869	1,401	—
1880	1,435	+2.4%
1890	1,442	+0.5%
1900	1,438	−0.3%
1910	1,291	−10.2%
1921	1,230	−4.7%
1930	1,162	−5.5%
1950	805	−30.7%
1961	899	+11.7%
1970	857	−4.7%
1980	802	−6.4%
1991	720	−10.2%
2001	588	−18.3%
2011	633	+7.7%
2021	683	+7.9%
Source: Censuses

== Notable people ==
- Josef Seger (1716–1782), organist, composer and educator
