= Jan Antonín Koželuh =

Czech composer (1738–1814)

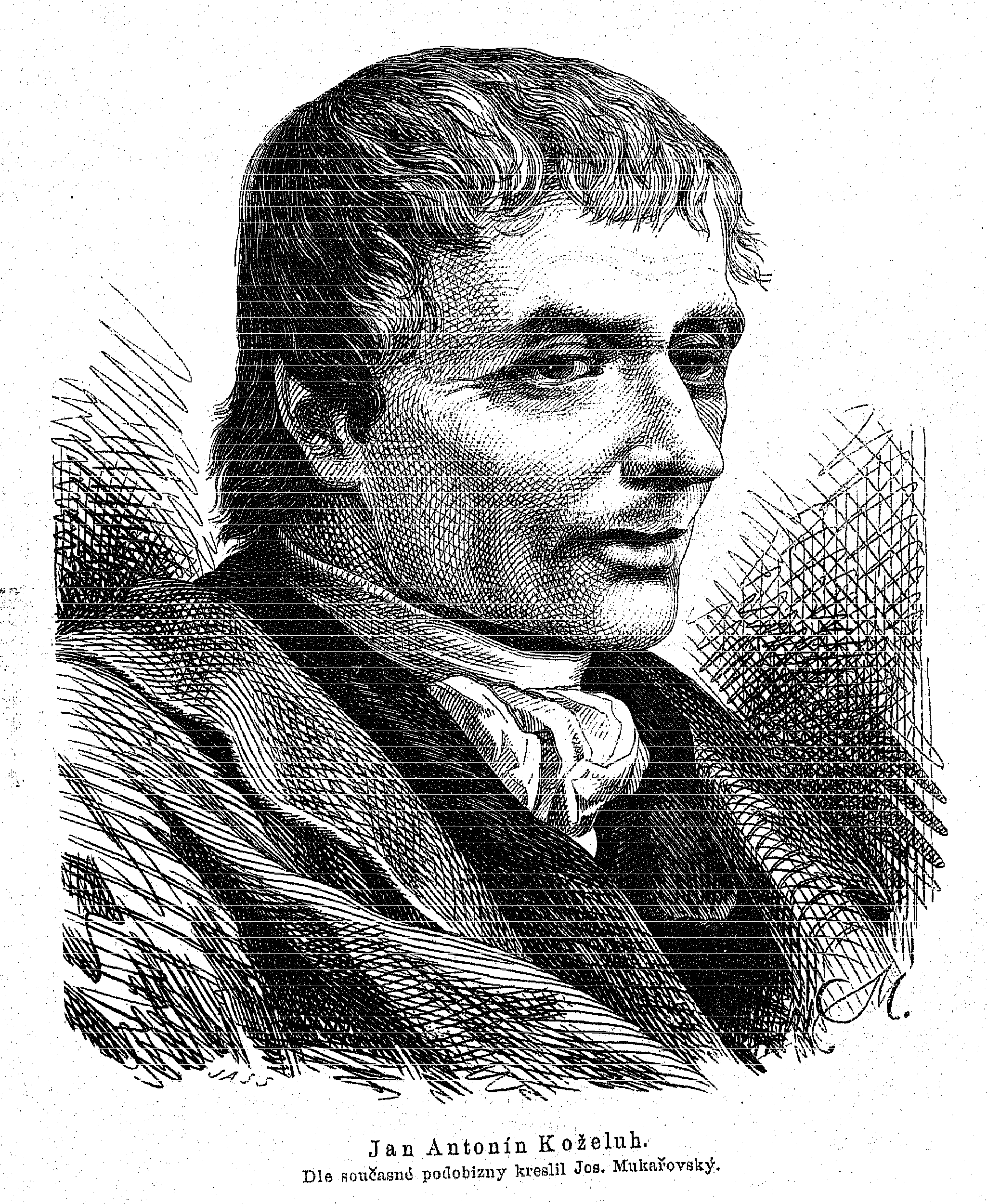
Portrait of Koželuh by Josef Mukařovský

Jan Antonín Koželuh (also Johann Antonin Kozeluch, Koscheluch, Jan Evangelista Antonín Tomáš; 14 December 1738 – 3 February 1814) was a Czech composer.

== Life ==
Koželuh was born on 14 December 1738 in Velvary, Bohemia. He was a pupil of Josef Seger and studied under the Jesuits. He studied in Vienna under Christoph Willibald von Gluck and Florian Gassmann. In 1784, he became a concert master in St. Vitus Cathedral for thirty years and the organist at the Strahov Monastery. His works includes 45 Masses, a Requiem, an oratorio, two operas, four symphonies, and several woodwind concertos. As one of the most respected Czech composers of his time, he also composed serious Italian operas: Allesandro nell' Indie was performed in 1769 and Demofoonte in 1772.

He was the teacher of his cousin Leopold Koželuch, whose name was originally also Jan Antonín Koželuh, but who changed his name in 1773.

Koželuh died on 3 February 1814 in Prague.

== Bibliography ==
- Van Boer, Bertil H.: Historical Dictionary of Music of the Classical Period, p. 314. Scarecrow Press, 2012.
