= František Tůma =

Czech composer

František Tůma

František Ignác Antonín Tůma (2 October 1704 – 3 February 1774) was a Czech composer of the Baroque era. He lived the greater part of his life in Vienna, first as director of music for Franz Joseph, Count Kinsky, later filling a similar office for the widow of Emperor Charles VI.

He was an important late-baroque composer, organist, gambist and theorbist.

== Life ==
Tůma was born on 2 October 1704 in Kostelec nad Orlicí, Kingdom of Bohemia. received his early musical training from his father, parish organist at Kostelec, and probably studied at the Clementinum, an important Jesuit seminary in Prague. He likely sang as a tenor chorister under Bohuslav Matěj Černohorský (an important composer and organist) at the Minorite Church of St. James the Great, and he is believed to have received musical instruction from him. Tůma then went to Vienna, where he was active as a church musician; according to Marpurg he became a vice-Kapellmeister at Vienna in 1722. Tůma's name first appears in Viennese records in April 1727, when he got married.

In 1731 he became Compositor und Capellen-Meister to Count Franz Ferdinand Kinsky, who was the High Chancellor of Bohemia. Kinsky's patronage made it possible for him to study counterpoint with Johann Fux in Vienna. He participated in the premiere of Fux's opera Constanza e Fortezza along with Georg Benda and Sylvius Leopold Weiss. In 1734, Kinsky recommended Tůma for the post of the Kapellmeister to Prague Cathedral, but his recommendation arrived too late and Tůma may have remained in Kinsky's service until the latter's death in 1741. In that year he was appointed Kapellmeister to the dowager empress, the widow of Emperor Charles VI. On her death in 1750, Tůma received a pension.

For the next 18 years he remained in Vienna and was active as a composer and as a player on the bass viol and the theorbo; he was esteemed by the court and the nobility, and at least one work may have been commissioned from him by the Empress Maria Theresa. After the death of his wife in about 1768, Tůma lived at the Premonstratensian monastery of Geras (Lower Austria), but in his last illness he returned to Vienna and died in the hospital of the Merciful Brethren in the Leopoldstadt. He died in Vienna on 3 February 1774, aged 69.

== Style ==
Tůma's music belongs stylistically to the late Baroque. His sacred works, which were known to Haydn and Mozart, were noted by his contemporaries for their solidity of texture and their sensitive treatment of the text as well as for their chromaticism. His instrumental music includes trio and quartet sonatas, sinfonias and partitas, mostly for strings and continuo; some of them were clearly intended for orchestral use.

Among his sacred works we find some 65 masses, 29 psalms and 5 settings of the Stabat Mater.

== Selected works ==
- Stabat Mater (5)
- Mass in C
- Mass in E-minor (64 masses)
- Symphony No. 7 in A
- Symphony in B-flat
- Litanie Lauretanie (20)
- Partita in D minor, for orchestra
- Sonata in G, for orchestra
- Psalm (29)
- Lamentations
- Miserere (1)
- Magnificat (3)
- Te Deum (1)

== Selected discography ==
- The Dresden Album. Johannes Pramsohler. Ensemble Diderot. (Audax Records ADX 13701)
- Mariánska hudba jezuitov a piaristov z Trenčína. Musica Aeterna Vox Aeterna. Artistic leader: Peter Zajíček (Musica Tyrnaviensis R68 003–2–231).
