= Jan Zach =

Czech composer, violinist and organist

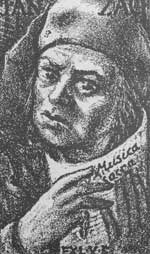
Jan Zach

Jan Zach, also known in German as Johann Zach (b. Čelákovice, Bohemia, bap. 13 November 1699 – Ellwangen, 24 May 1773) was a Czech composer, violinist and organist. Although he was a gifted and versatile composer capable of writing both in Baroque and Classical idioms, his eccentric personality led to numerous conflicts and lack of steady employment from about 1756 onwards.

== Life ==
Zach was born in Dehtáry near Brandýs nad Labem, Bohemia into a wheelwright's family. In 1724 he moved to Prague and started working as violinist at St Gallus and at St Martín. According to Dlabacž, he studied organ under Bohuslav Matěj Černohorský, who lived in Prague from 1720 to 1727. Zach's career as organist started at St Martín, and by 1737 he was also playing the organ at the monastic church of the Merciful Brethren and the Minorite chapel of St Ann. In 1737 he competed for the position of organist at St. Vitus Cathedral, but was not successful. Details of what happened next are unknown: he was reported to have left Bohemia, but apparently remained in Prague at least until 1740. By early 1745 he was living in Augsburg and then on 24 April 1745 he was appointed Kapellmeister of the Electoral orchestra at the court of Johann Friedrich Karl von Ostein, Prince-Elector of Mainz. He visited Italy in 1746 and, briefly, Bohemia in 1747.

Zach evidently had a complex and eccentric personality, which led to numerous conflicts that plagued his life at Mainz. He was suspended from his position in 1750 and finally dismissed in 1756. From that point on it appears that Zach never again had steady employment. He traveled through Europe and supported himself financially by performing and selling copies of his works, teaching, dedicating his compositions, and so on. He visited numerous courts and monasteries in Germany and Austria, stayed in Italy in 1767 and between 1771 and 1772, and may have worked as choirmaster at the Pairis Abbey in Alsace. He stayed several times at the Stams Abbey at Stams, Tyrol, where he may have had connections, and served as music teacher at the Jesuit school in Munich, for several brief periods of time. The last mentions of Zach in contemporary sources indicate that in January 1773 he was at the Wallerstein court, and according to the Frankfurt Kayserliche Reichs-Ober-Post-Amts-Zeitung of 5 June 1773 he died on a journey, at Ellwangen. Zach was buried in the local church of St Wolfgang.

== Works ==
A comprehensive list of works has not been completely established. Toward the end of his life, Zach gave numerous compositions to the monks at the Cistercian monastery at Stams. These manuscripts comprise the largest repository of Zach's works in the world.

Zach's surviving oeuvre comprises a wealth of both instrumental and sacred music: some 30 masses, 28 string sinfonias, a dozen keyboard works and other pieces. Due to the nature of Zach's life it is difficult to establish a precise chronology. His work reflects the transition from the old Baroque style to the emerging Classical music era ideals. With multiple influences of the Italian composers, whose music had made it to Prague, trips to Italy, access to the famous textbook of Johann Joseph Fux, Gradus ad Parnassum, Czech folk music, and a strong organ technique, Zach was equally adept at strict counterpoint and the style galant. In addition, Zach was fond of adventurous chromatic modulations. The scholar Johann Branberger, writing in the early 20th century, noted Zach's preference for "chromatic, and often exotic, themes."

The Harpsichord Concerto in C minor (K C17) exemplifies the transition from the Baroque to Galant style that took place throughout the 18th century. While this particular concerto demonstrates qualities from both styles, it tends more toward the modern. It is in three movements that follow the typical fast - slow - fast format of the Galant Concerti. Although the harmonic minor tonality and austere melody of the opening ritornello is reminiscent of Bach, the tone quickly turns sweeter with the entrance of the second theme. Typical of the Galant style, the harmony moves slowly with the underlying pulse carried by repeated eighth notes. The melodic content often consists of light flourishes in groupings of two or four measures, and the diatonic sequences are short and plain. The Baroque style most often emerges in the keyboard part with complex, chromatic, and virtuosic patterns. Furthermore, the counterpart between keyboard and orchestra is more intricate than what would be normally expected in the Galant style.

Only a few of Zach's pieces were published during his lifetime: a harpsichord sonata (in Oeuvres mêlées, v/6 (Nuremberg, 1759)), a harpsichord concerto (Nuremberg, 1766; GS C13), and the collection Sei sonate for harpsichord and violin or flute (Paris, 1767).

== List of works ==
A thematic catalogue of Zach's work was published by K.M. Komma in 1938 (K numbers); since then more works were found, and some were catalogued by A. Gottron and W. Senn in 1955 (GS numbers).

=== Sacred vocal ===
- 33 masses (K B1–16, GS B1–11, 14–15, and four in CZ-Pnm)
- miscellaneous single mass movements (K B32–3, GS B13, and others)
- 3 requiems (K B17–18, GS B12)
- 10 offertories (K B20–21, GS B 16–20, 41, and two in Pnm)
- various arias, hymns, motets, vespers settings, etc., including four musicae navales, opp.1–4, dating from 1737 to 1740 and now lost

=== Instrumental ===
==== Ensemble ====
- 3 sinfonias à 3, for 2 violins and basso continuo (K C1–2, GS C12)
- 6 sinfonias à 4, for 2 violins, viola, and basso continuo (K C3–5, 14, 19)
- 19 sinfonias for strings and woodwinds (K C6–12, 13, 15–17, 20–22, GS C1–4, 11)
- 5 partitas for strings and woodwinds (GS C5–9)
- Parthia in D major, for 2 oboes, 2 horns, and 2 bassoons
- Sinfonia for harpsichord, 2 violins, viola, and basso continuo (K C18)
- 6 harpsichord concertos (K C26, GS C13–16, 17)
- 6 flute concertos (K C23–5, GS C19–21)
- Oboe Concerto (GS C22)
- Cello Concerto (GS C18)
- Sei sonate, for harpsichord and violin or flute (Paris, 1767)
- 3 trio sonatas, for 2 violins and basso continuo (GS C23–4, and one more
- Partita in C major (GS C25)
- Sonata in A major (GS C26)
- Capriccio in C minor (GS C27)
- [Movement] in A major (GS C28)

==== Organ ====
- Prelude in C minor (K A1)
- Prelude in D major(K A2)
- Prelude in A-flat major K A3)
- Fugue in C minor (K A4)
- Fugue in A minor (K A5) (= a work of Joseph Lipavsky 1772 -1810)
- Fugue in G minor (GS A1)
- Fugue in D minor (= a work of Joseph Lipavsky 1772 - 1810)
