= Vladimir Winkler =

Czech sculptor

- Born: František Winkler; 1 June 1885; Přerov, Moravia, Austria-Hungary
- Died: 1956 (aged 70–71); Harbin, China
- Known for: Sculpture, architecture
- Notable work: Omsk Drama Theater
- Movement: Baroque

Vladimir Winkler (born František Winkler; Russian: Влади́мир Фра́нцевич Ви́нклер, IPA: [vlɐˈdʲimʲɪr ˈvʲinklʲɪr]; 1 June 1885 – 1956) was a Czech sculptor. He is best known for early 20th century buildings' facades in Russian Siberia.

== Biography ==
František Winkler was born on 1 June 1885 in Přerov, Moravia, Austria-Hungary (today the Czech Republic). Since his childhood he was interested in art, and his father sent him to an Industrial Arts school in Prague, after graduating from which, František entered the Prague School of Applied Arts, where he studied in the class of Professor Stanislav Sucharda. Winkler graduated from the school in 1908 and engaged in arts.

World War I, that started in 1914, changed his life. He was a photographer at the Russian-German front and was taken captive. As a prisoner of war, he was sent to Omsk.

At that time, Omsk was passing through the phase of cultural and economic upturn. The city was growing rapidly and had resources to elect monumental administrative buildings, cultural and educational facilities. Omsk needed Winkler's talent to decorate the facades and interiors. In the beginning, he was the only academic sculptor in the region. František Winkler adopted the name Vladimir when living in Russia.

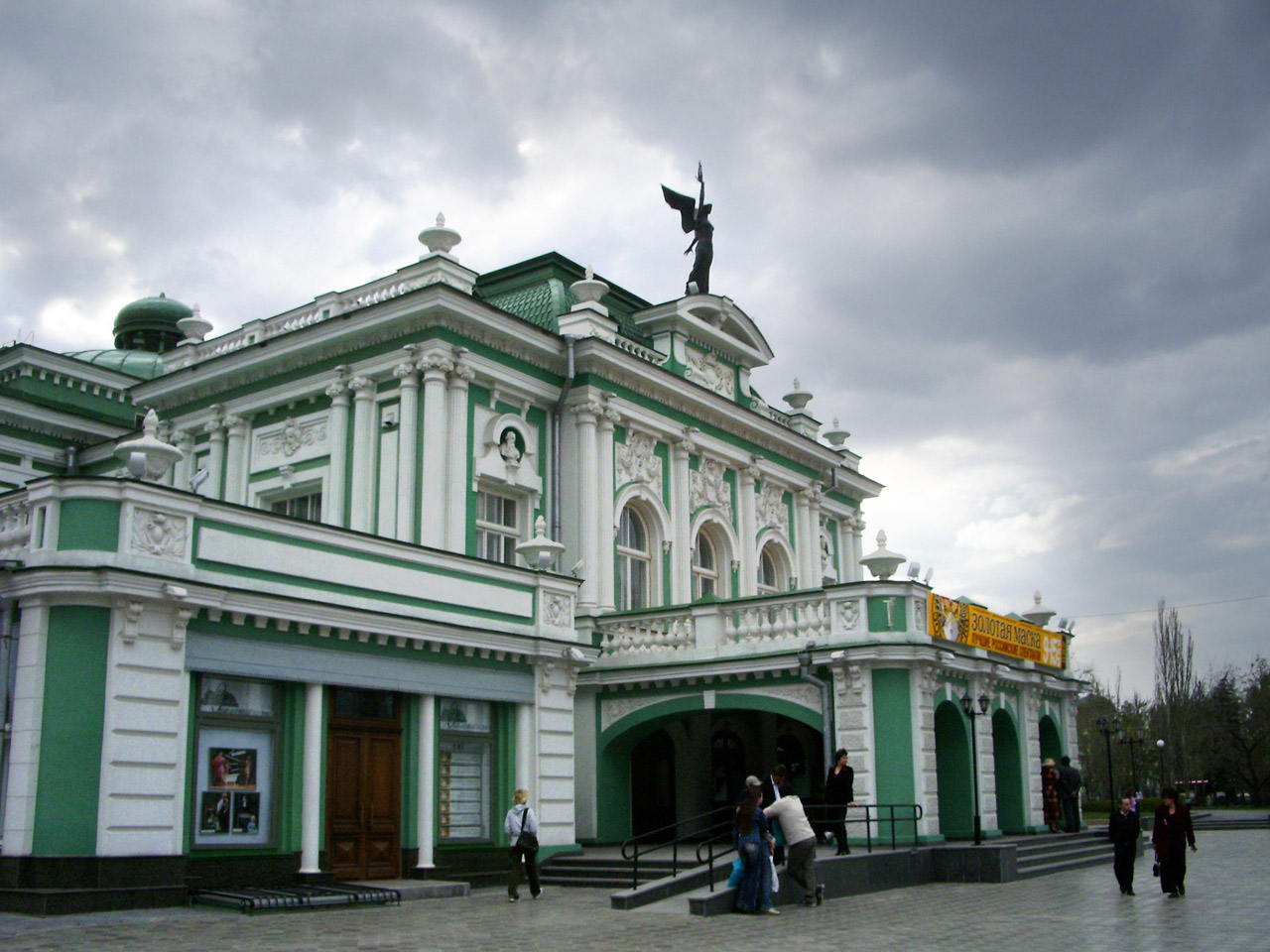
Omsk Drama Theater Winger genius by Vladimir Winkler

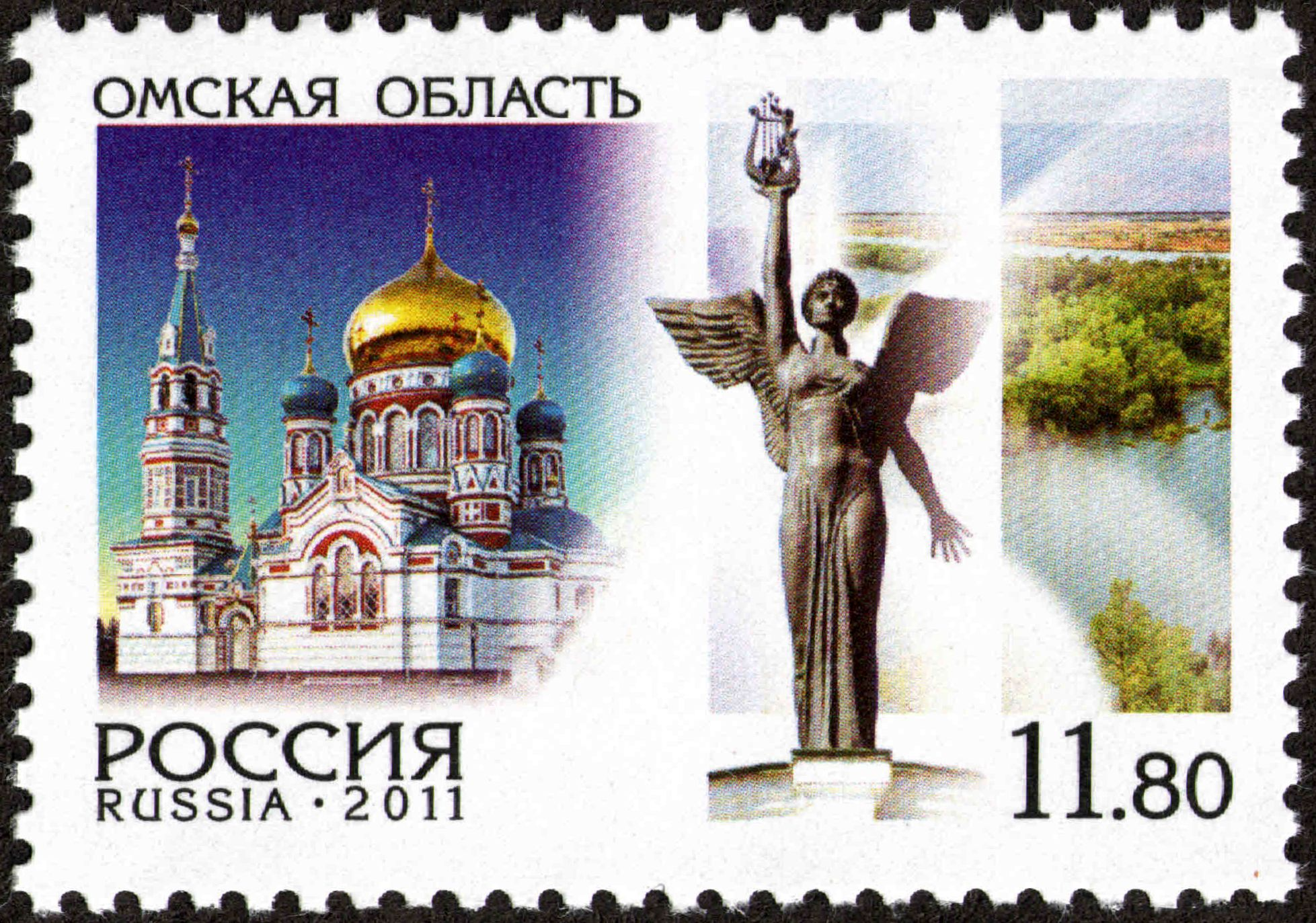
A Russian stamp depicting the statue of a winged genius by Vladimir Winkler

Winkler's works include the buildings of New Town Theater (now Omsk Drama Theater), which pediment is topped by his sculpture of a winged genius, Omsk Railway Administration, Commercial School, Chrystal Palace cinema, Court of Justice, Russian Asiatic Society.

In early 1918, Winkler went with Czechoslovak Legion to Vladivostok, where he continued his work through the Civil War and several political system changes. New Theater's sculptural decoration, created in 1924, and the monumental composition "The proletarian, breaking the chains around the Earth" on the Palace of Labour mark his Soviet period.

In 1928, he left the Soviet Russia and went to Harbin, China, where many White Russians lived at that time, and again lived through wars and different political regimes, first creating works dedicated to Nicholas II, then to Stalin and Mao Zedong. Winkler died in Harbin in 1956.
