= Eduard Petiška =

Czech writer

- Born: 14 May 1924; Prague, Czechoslovakia
- Died: 6 June 1987 (aged 63); Mariánské Lázně, Czechoslovakia
- Education: Charles University
- Occupations: Writer, poet
- Spouse: Alena Petišková
- Children: 1

Eduard Petiška (14 May 1924 – 6 June 1987) was a Czech writer and poet. He was author of more than ninety titles. His books have been translated into dozens of languages and have become popular abroad. Total sales of his works have exceeded eighteen million copies.

His most famous works include Ancient Greek Myths and Legends and stories about Krtek. Eduard Petiška is the father of writer Martin Petiška.

== Biography ==
Petiška was born in Prague on 14 May 1924. He shared his love of books with his father who was a classmate of Jaroslav Hašek, who sat next to him. Hašek later used Petiška's name in his own writings. His Father also worked at an insurance company with Franz Kafka, and was among the first audience for Kafka's writings.

The poet's mother, born Adeline Windant, gave up her career of an opera singer. Petiška had been accepted to a music conservatory (to become an actor or opera singer) when war changed his life. Due to the Nazi occupation he was forced to work as a lathe hand in Volmanov's factory in Čelákovice instead of taking up his studies.

Petiška had been attracted to stories and people's fates since childhood. He began as a listener (his famous book of German fairytales, Daisy, is based on stories his grandmother used to tell him), and later a passionate reader, who began to try writing prose of his own.

After 1945 he studied Comparative Literature and Germanics, but attended other classes as well, including aesthetics and medicine. After the liberation he immediately involved himself in cultural life, at first (while still a student) as a poet. He started publishing prose and poetry, wrote articles for newspapers and children's magazines, was active in Umělecká beseda (an artists' union), and worked in film and radio. He was also an active member of the Czech Writers Syndicate (Syndikát českých spisovatelů). He planned to shoot "film poetry" (a sort of predecessor of today's video clips) with Konstantin Biebl.

These activities were suddenly disrupted after February 1948. He married Alena, a teacher from an old family of teachers, in the same year (at the age of 24). His wife was a great support to him during his whole life, creating a harmonious home in which Petiška's work could flourish.

Their son, Martin, who later became a writer himself, was a frequent source of inspiration to his father. You can find Martin in Petiška's books: Martin's Reading Book, How Martin Got Lost, etc.

Petiška had many friends in artistic circles; he associated especially with people who, like himself, were marginalized during the 1950s. These included writers Jaroslav Seifert, František Hrubín, Bohumil Hrabal and Emanuel Frynta; and artists Jiří Kolář, Kamil Lhoták, Zdeněk Miler, Karel Teissig, Vladimír Komárek, Zdeněk Sklenář, Vilém Plocek who illustrated his books, Cyril Bouda and Helena Zmatlíková.

An unofficial club originated in his apartment in Brandýs nad Labem during the 1950s – it served as a meeting place for his friends where they could read their writings and discuss innovations in the world of arts.

== Writings ==
During the 1950s, when he was banned from publishing books for adults, Petiška started writing stories for children and youth instead. He became known throughout the world for his children's books, including About the Little Apple Tree, About Children and Animals, Fairytale Grandfather, How the Mole Came to his Pants, Mole and the Car, Birliban, Ancient Greek Myths and Legends, and Tales of a Thousand and One Nights.

Later he also published poetry (including Moments, To Empty Places, Ovidio's Family, and Autumn Diary), novels (Before the Men Mature, Judge Knorr, A Young Man's Guide to Marriage, and The Heart in which I live), and Germanic studies (Readings of J.W. Goethe; Goethe in Bohemia and Bohemia in Goethe). He translated G.E. Lessing, Goethe, Heinrich Heine, Günter Grass and others.

At the end of his career he used to be surrounded by large numbers of fans at book-signings. It was not unusual for him to write a third inscription in one book – the first having been written many years earlier for the grandmother, the second for her daughter, and the third for her granddaughter, who still loved the same stories.

== Ancient Greek Myths and Legends ==
This book, probably the most famous of Petiška's works, was written when he did not believe that the communist regime would ever allow him to write for adults again. He conceived it as a "novel about life in Bohemia" – about Czech hopes and despairs, the gods representing particular political ideologies or attitudes. This archetypal narration is probably the reason the book is a worldwide success. It is not merely a simple retelling of ancient myths – it is a compact account of human life and character. This message is understandable in all the many languages it has been translated into (including German, English, Italian, Dutch, Russian, Hungarian, Estonian and Slovenian). In France it had been published twenty five times by 2011, and was part of school literature curriculums.

Ancient Greek Myths and Legends was the key work of Petiška's literary production. This theme, which other writers overlooked because they perceived it as too elaborate and trivial, became the basis of his career; he became a favorite storyteller for both children and adults, narrating about pressure and happiness, fidelity and betrayal, and about the brevity and potential of life.

== Death and legacy ==
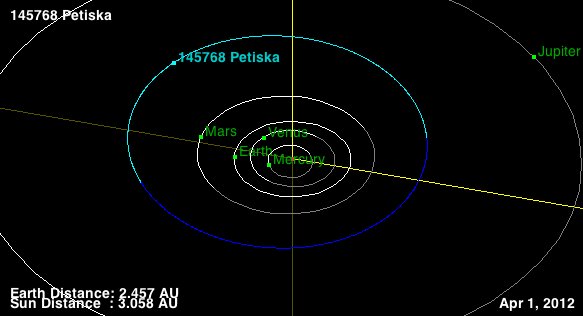
The asteroid Petiška

Eduard Petiška died suddenly (in the manner he had anticipated in his poem "How a Poet Would Like to Die") during his annual stay at the health resort of Mariánské Lázně on 6 June 1987. A plaque with his portrait created by Reon Argondian has been placed on the house at 5, Karlovarská Street, where he stayed in Mariánské Lázně.

The ninety literary works which he left behind remain alive; they are published repeatedly and have been translated into many languages including Chinese, Japanese, Arabic, Vietnamese and Esperanto. A comprehensive bibliography of his work (both original and translated), edited by Věra Vladyková, was published in 1999.

Petiška's works were granted many awards after the Velvet Revolution, including the Platinum Award, the Rudolf II Award, and the Franz Kafka Medal. In 1997 an asteroid was named after him.
