= Otakar Sedloň =

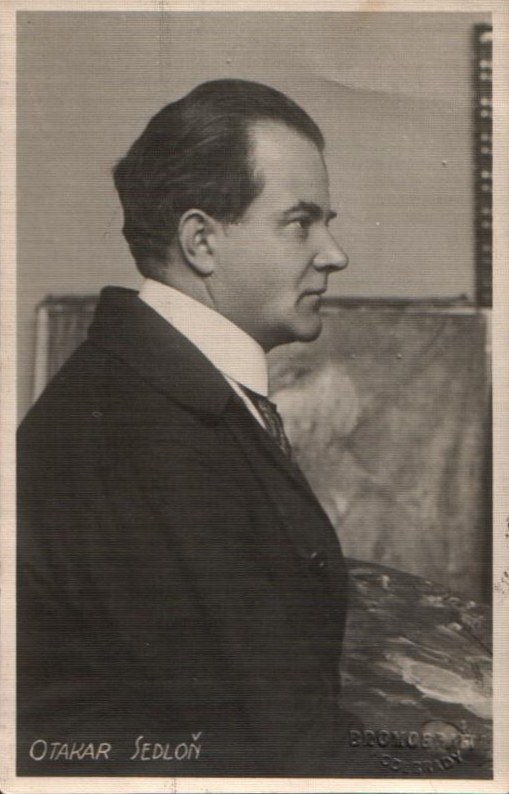
- Born: 30 August 1885; Trpín, Bohemia
- Died: 18 October 1973 (aged 88); Prague, Czechoslovakia
- Education: Academy of Arts, Architecture and Design in Prague
- Occupations: Teacher, academic painter
- Parent(s): Tomáš Sedloň, Josefa Čápek(ová)

Otakar Sedloň (1885–1973) was a Czech realistic painter.

== Life ==
Otakar Sedloň was born on 30 August 1885 in Trpín in eastern Bohemia in Austria-Hungary. He attended primary school in Doudleby nad Orlicí and followed on with a high school education in Kostelec nad Orlicí, where he graduated in 1904. Then he started studying on Academy of Arts, Architecture and Design in Prague, where he graduated in 1908.

In the mid-1920s, he travelled quite a bit, visiting places like the coast along the Adriatic Sea, Paris, Carpathian Ruthenia and Romania. This travel offered him great inspiration for his future activities as an artist. He eventually became a member of the association of artists called Myslbek and was a frequent participant in exhibitions arranged by this association. During this time, Sedloň had his studio on the prestigious Národní třída street in Prague and was known as an excellent portrait painter. His paintings were displayed in the offices of ministries, banks and held by private collectors.

After World War II and the communist revolution in Czechoslovakia in 1948, he was barred from Myslbek because of his antagonism against communist rule and so-called socialist realism.

Otakar Sedloň died on 18 October 1973 and was buried in the family tomb in Vamberk, together with his mother and father.

== Gallery ==
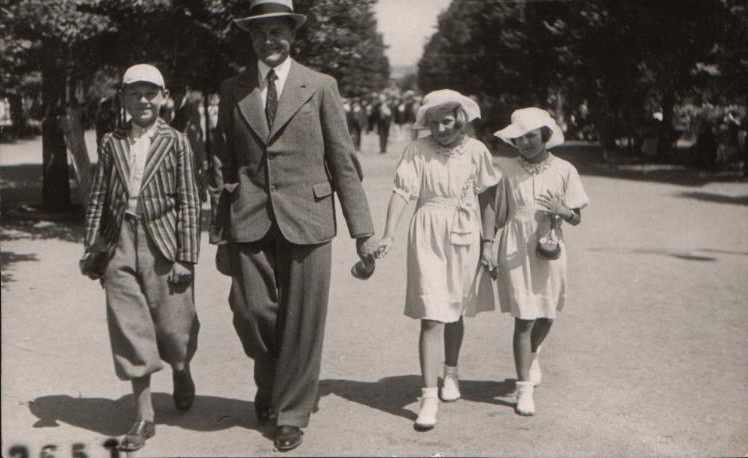
Sedloň with his nephew and nieces on walk in Poděbrady

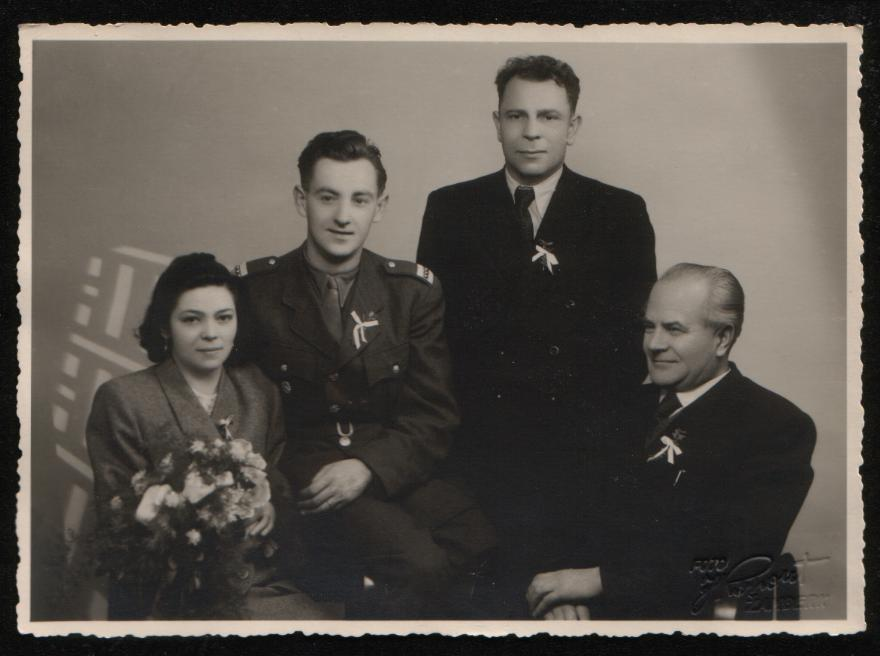
Sedloň at nephew's wedding, Žamberk (1947)

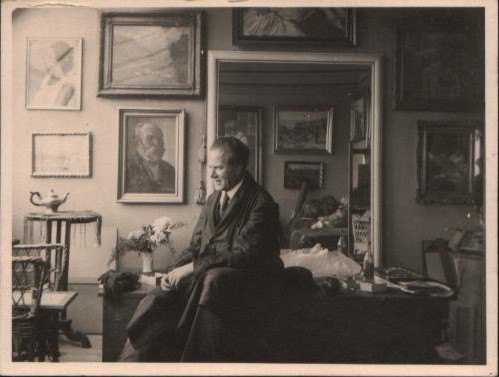
Sedloň in his studio, Prague (c. 1950s)
