= Josef Alexej Eisenberger =

Josef Alexej Eisenberger (1887-1955) was a World War II brigadier general from Czechoslovakia.
