= Lešany (Benešov District) =

- Municipality
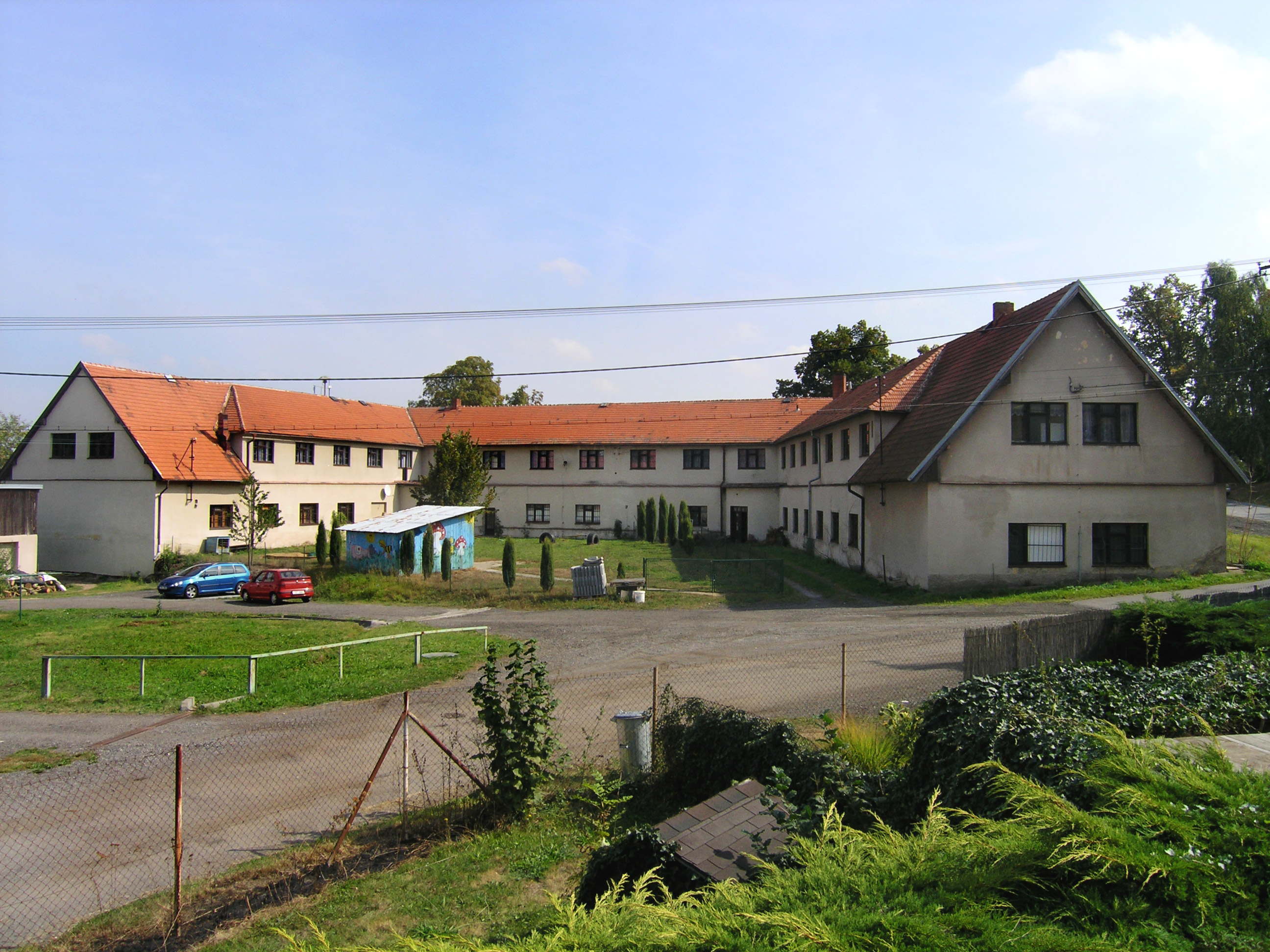
- Centre of Lešany

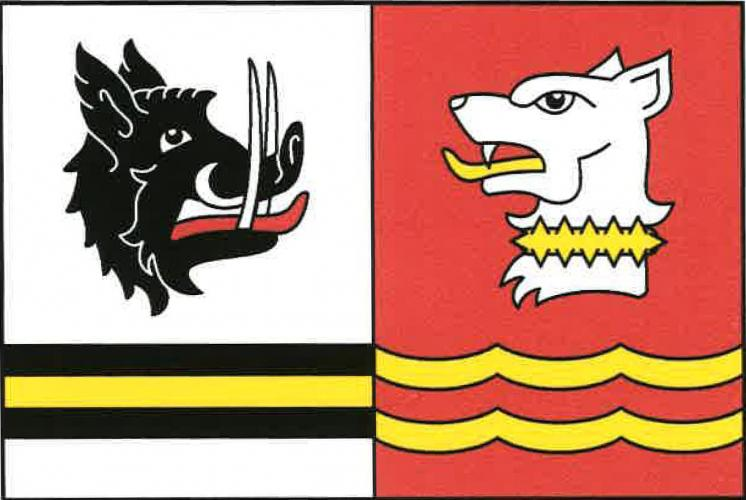
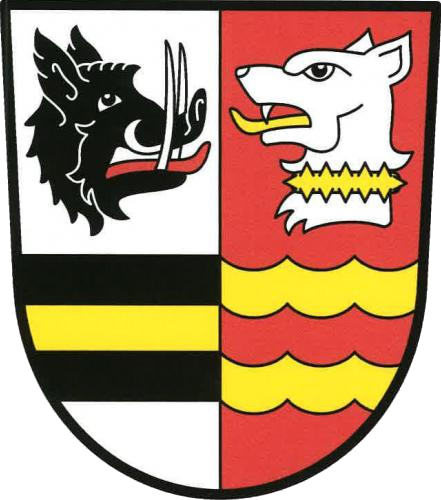
- Flag Coat of arms

- Location in the Czech Republic
- Coordinates: 49°50′39″N 14°31′30″E
- Country: Czech Republic
- Region: Central Bohemian
- District: Benešov
- First mentioned: 1185

Area
  - Total: 14.44 km^{2} (5.58 sq mi)
- Elevation: 318 m (1,043 ft)

Population (2026-01-01)
  - Total: 894
  - Density: 61.9/km^{2} (160/sq mi)
- Time zone: UTC+1 (CET)
  - Summer (DST): UTC+2 (CEST)
- Postal code: 257 44
- Website: www.obeclesany.com

Lešany is a municipality and village in Benešov District in the Central Bohemian Region of the Czech Republic. It has about 900 inhabitants.

== Administrative division ==
Lešany consists of three municipal parts (in brackets population according to the 2021 census):

- Lešany (378)
- Břežany (464)
- Nová Ves (28)

== Etymology ==
The old Czech word lešan (from les = 'forest') denoted a person who lived near a forest or between forests. So Lešany was a village of such people.

== Geography ==
Lešany is located about 13 kilometres (8 mi) northwest of Benešov and 20 km (12 mi) south of Prague. It lies in the Benešov Uplands. The highest point is the hill Chocholouš at 388 m (1,273 ft) above sea level. The Sázava River flows through the municipality.

== History ==
The first written mention of Lešany is from 1185. The village often changed owners, who were various less important nobles. In 1683, the Metropolitan Chapter at Saint Vitus purchased Lešany and made it the centre of a small estate.

== Demographics ==
Historical population

Year	Pop.	±%
1869	965	—
1880	890	−7.8%
1890	940	+5.6%
1900	963	+2.4%
1910	983	+2.1%

Year	Pop.	±%
1921	1,007	+2.4%
1930	968	−3.9%
1950	951	−1.8%
1961	815	−14.3%
1970	708	−13.1%

Year	Pop.	±%
1980	621	−12.3%
1991	550	−11.4%
2001	551	+0.2%
2011	695	+26.1%
2021	870	+25.2%

Source: Censuses

== Transport ==
There are no railways or major roads passing through the municipality.

== Sights ==
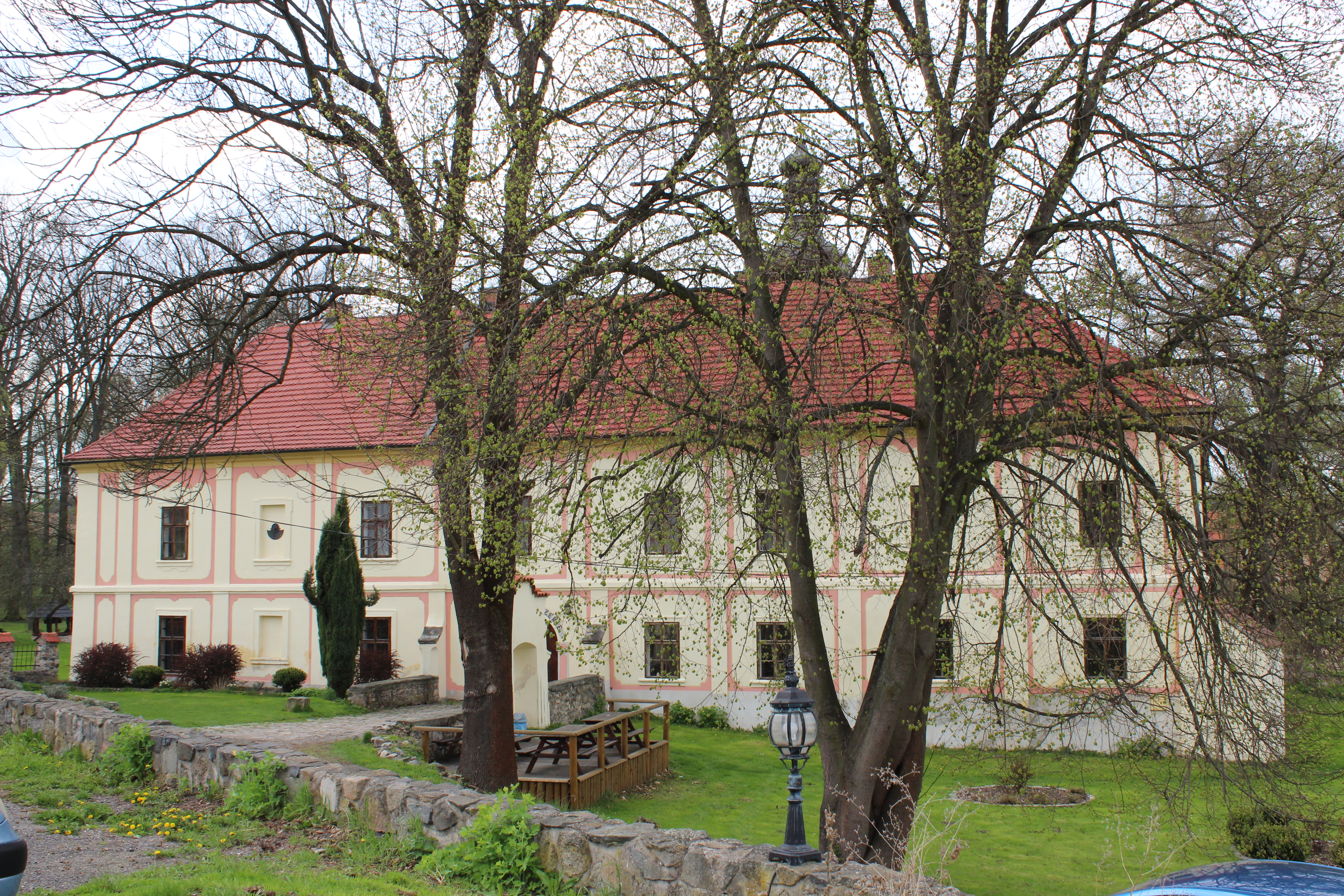
Lešany Castle

The main landmark of Lešany is the Lešany Castle. It was built in 1683 on the site of an old fortress from the 14th century. The castle was then modified in the mid-18th century, and partially rebuilt after a fire in 1903.

The municipality is known for of the Military Museum Lešany that is located in the former artillery barracks.

== Notable people ==
- František Hrubín (1910–1971), poet and writer; grew up here
- Libuše Benešová (born 1948), politician and former mayor of Lešany; lives here
