= Bohuslav Matěj Černohorský =

Czech music educator, composer, organist and priest

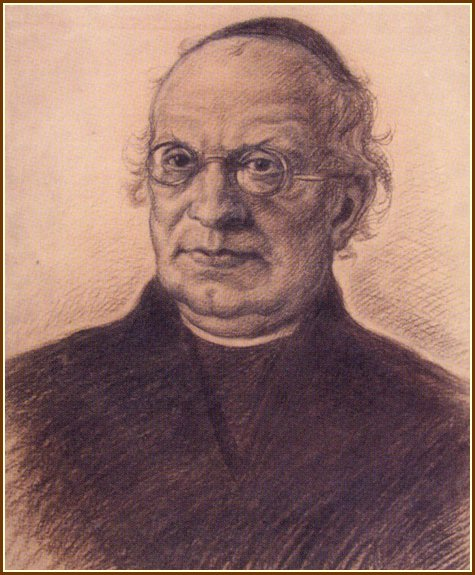
Bohuslav Matěj Černohorský

Bohuslav Matěj Černohorský (16 February 1684 – 1 July 1742) was a Czech composer, organist and teacher of the Baroque era. He wrote among other works motets, other choral works (a fugue Laudetur Jesus Christus is cited by the Baroque Music Library as an excellent example of its kind) and organ solo works.

== Life ==
Černohorský was born on 16 February 1684 in Nymburk, Bohemia. He was a son of a Nymburk cantor named Samuel Černohorský. From 1700 to 1702, he studied philosophy at the Prague University. In 1704, Černohorský became a member of the Conventual Franciscan; later, in 1708 he was ordained as a priest. Nevertheless, in 1710 he left for Assisi, Papal States to study music. Because he left without consent of his superiors he was expelled from Czech lands for ten years. From 1710 to 1715 he worked as an organist in the Basilica of San Francesco d'Assisi. He was called "Padre Boemo" in Italy. One of his students in Italy was Giuseppe Tartini. After the expiration of his punishment, he came back to Prague, where he devoted himself to teaching. Among the important pupils are Christoph Willibald Gluck, Josef Seger, František Tůma and others. In 1731 he came to Italy again, and worked as an organist at Basilica of Saint Anthony in Padua. Černohorský died in Graz ion 1 July 1742. Most of his manuscripts were destroyed in a fire at the minorite convent in Prague in 1753.

== Style ==
Černohorský was an important representative of the late Baroque style. He composed fugues and toccatas for organ, as well as vocal works. He deeply influenced the musical evolution in Bohemia as a composer, as well as a teacher.

== Selected works ==
- Vesperae Minus Solemnes (1702–1710) for choir, two violins and organ
- Regina Coeli (1712), antifone for double choir
- Laudetur Jesus Christus (1729) for soprano, alt, tenor, bass, strings and organ
- Precatus est Moyses
- Quare Domine Irasceris both for soprano, alt, tenor, bass, two violins, viola, three trumpets and organ
