= Teodor Rotrekl =

Czech illustrator and painter (1923–2004)

Teodor Rotrekl (6 June 1923 in Brno – 1 September 2004 in Prague) was a Czech illustrator and painter. His most known works are illustrations of science fiction books and journals.
