= František Hrubín =

Czech poet and writer (1910–1971)

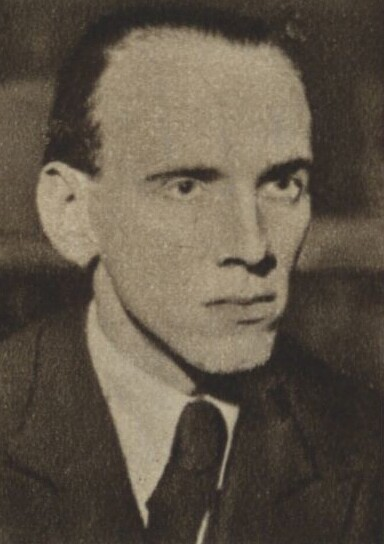
František Hrubín

František Hrubín (17 September 1910 – 1 March 1971) was a Czech poet and writer.

== Biography ==
Frantisek Hrubín was born into the family of a builder at Prague. His family lived in Lešany near Prague during World War I, and Hrubín visited his home village throughout his life. He studied at a grammar school in Prague. In 1932 he began studying law and philosophy at Charles University, but he did not graduate. In 1934 he started working as a librarian. He got married in 1939 and had a daughter and a son. His children were a great impulse for writing children's poetry.

After World War II he worked briefly at the Ministry of Propaganda and became a freelance writer in 1946. He co-founded a legendary Czech children's magazine, Mateřídouška (The Thyme). He often stayed in Chlum u Třeboně (Jiří Trnka recommended he buy a cottage there) in South Bohemia, whose countryside was an important source of inspiration for his work. In 1956 at the II. Czechoslovak Writers' Assembly he criticised (together with Jaroslav Seifert) the combination of literature and politics which had increased after February 1948. In 1960 he became the chairman of the Poetry Friends Club (Klub přátel poezie). He died in České Budějovice and is buried at the Vyšehrad cemetery.

== Works ==
- A co básník, 1963
- Až do konce lásky, 1961
- Až do konce poezie: Výbor z veršů, 1975
- Básnické dílo Františka Hrubína, 1967–1977 (6 parts)
- Běží ovce, běží, 1957
- Buďme všichni básníky, 1966
- Chléb s ocelí, 1945
- Chvíli doma, chvíli venku, 1946
- Cikády, 1943
- Černá denice, 1968
- Dětem, 1974
- Dívej se a podívej, 1955
- Dobrý den, sluníčko!, 1947
- Doušek života, 1949
- Drahokam domova, 1976
- Dvakrát sedm pohádek, 1958
- Dvě veselé pohádky (Pohádka o veliké řepě, 1957, Začarovaný les, 1957)
- Hirošima, 1948
- Hodina zamilovaných, 1963
- Hrajeme si celý den, 1955
- Hrajte si s námi, 1953
- Jak se chytá sluníčko, 1948
- Je nám dobře na světě, 1951
- Jobova noc, 1945
- Knihy Františka Hrubína pro děti, 1968–1976 (3 parts)
- Kolik je sluníček, 1961
- Kráska a zvíře, 1972
- Krásná po chudobě, 1935
- Křišťálová noc, 1961
- Kuřátko a obilí, 1953
- Kůzlátka a hloupý vlk, 1992
- Kytička z náčrtníku, 1958
- Ladův veselý přírodopis, 1950
- Lásky, 1967
- Lešanské jesličky: Vánoční balada, 1970
- Letadlo se skokany, 1968
- Mánesův orloj, 1953
- Mávnutí křídel, 1944
- Měsíce, 1946
- Modré hladiny: Výbor z díla, 1984
- Modré nebe, 1948
- Motýlí čas, 1948
- Můj zpěv, 1956
- Na paměť osvobození, 1960
- Nesmírný krásný život, 1947
- Nesu, nesu kvítí, 1951
- Noční rozmluvy
- Oblohy, 1960
- Oldřich a Božena aneb Krvavé spiknutí v Čechách, 1969
- Paleček, 1949
- Pasáček a sluníčko, 1954
- Po Novém roce jaro, 1959
- Pohádka o Květušce a její zahrádce, plná zvířátek, ptáků, květin a nakonec dětí, 1955
- Pohádka o tom, jak přišla kukačka o chocholku, 1961
- Pohádky z Tisíce a jedné noci, 1956
- Poledne, 1943
- Poledne ženy, 1955
- Proměna, 1957
- Próza a dramata Františka Hrubína, 1969
- Přilby a šeříky, 1960
- Romance pro křídlovku (Romanze für ein Flügelhorn), 1962
- Řeka nezapomnění, 1946
- Říkejte si abecedu, 1948
- Říkejte si pohádky, 1946
- Říkejte si se mnou, 1943
- S orly a se skřivany, 1943
- Sněhurka, zvířátka a sedm mužíčků, 1948
- Srpnová neděle, 1958
- Svit hvězdy umřelé: Za Františkem Halasem, 1967
- Sviť, sluníčko, sviť, 1961
- Šípková Růženka, 1951
- Školáčkův rok, 1956
- Špalíček pohádek (Ein Bündel Märchen), 1957
- Špalíček veršů a pohádek, 1960
- Ticho: Památce Františka Halase, 1950
- To je jízda, to je let!, 1950
- Tři kluci sportovci, 1950
- U srdce Tvého
- U stolu, 1958
- Vánoční sen malé Zdeny v noci štědrovečerní, 1947
- Včelí plást, 1940
- Verše 1942-1948, 1956
- Vidím zemi širou, 1968
- Vítek hádá dobře, 1946
- Výbor z poezie 1932-1938, 1947
- Za hvězdné noci, 1981
- Zasadil dědek řepu, 1947
- Země po polednách, 1937
- Země sudička, 1941
- Zimní pohádka o Smolíčkovi, 1954
- Zlatá reneta, 1964
- Zpěv hrobů a slunce, 1947
- Zpíváno z dálky, 1933
- Zvířátka a Petrovští, 1947
- Živá abeceda, 1954
- Živote, postůj: Výbor z díla, 1987
