= Petr Maděra =

Czech poet and novelist (born 1970)

Petr Maděra (born 10 July 1970) is a Czech poet and novelist.

== Early and personal life ==
Maděra was born on 10 July in Ostrov nad Ohří.

After graduating from a grammar school, he studied landscape engineering at the Agricultural College in Prague. He specialised mainly in landscape architecture, dendrology and pisciculture. After that, he worked as an educator of the blind, and also as a landscape environmentalist for the district authorities in Prague-East. At the end of the 1990s, he took part in editing the Weles magazine, an important platform for the most recent poets. Nowadays he is dealing with applied graphics and works as an editor of a number of geology-oriented magazines and publications. He lives with his wife and two sons in Prague.

== Works ==
His work is characterized by very original poetics as far as both imagery and austere, distinctly polished expression are concerned. These qualities refer to the inspiration by Vladimír Holan's poetry. Together with the collections of poetry by Bogdan Trojak, Petr Hruška, Petr Borkovec, Pavel Kolmačka and J. H. Krchovský, Maděra's two highly praised poetry books, Krevel and Komorní hůrka have formed the horizon of recent Czech poetry. Has widely published in the following literary periodicals: Iniciály, Modrý květ, Weles, Host, Tvar, Texty, Sedmá generace etc.

=== Poetry ===
- Krevel (Host, 1997)
- Komorní hůrka (Host, 2001)

=== Prose ===
- Černobílé rty (Protis, 2007) - a novella about "love in the darkness"

=== Participation in anthologies ===
- Holan 90
- Almanach Pant
- Cesty šírání
- Přetržená nit
- Skřípavá hudba vrat
- Co si myslí andělíček
- S Tebou sám - Antologie současné české milostné poezie
- Básně pro děti – Jak se učil vítr číst
- Antologie nové české literatury 1995-2004
- Antologie české poezie
- Báseň mého srdce / poezie jako výraz osobnosti / rukopisy, portréty, kréda současných českých básníků

== References and external links ==
- Portal of Czech literature, in Czech and German
- Online anthology of Czech poetry, in Czech

=== About the author in Czech press ===
- Čermáček, P.: Neprohráblými uhlíky slov. Sedmá generace 11, 2001, s. 18.
- Čermáček, P.: Příběhy Petra Maděry. Psí víno 19, 2001, s. 25.
- Fridrich, R.: Syrové maso básní P. Maděry. Pandora 1, 1997, s. 33.
- Harák, I.: Tři z Hosta. Landek 4, 1998, s. 50–51.
- Hrbáč, P. : Mimořádný básník. Tvar 7, 1997, s. 23.
- Jareš, M.: Tři polohy současné české poezie. Tvar 4, 2002, s. 16–17.
- Kotrla, P.: Podařilo se. Tvar 7, 1997, s. 23.
- Kovářík, M.: Petr Maděra: Andělské chlebíčky na dalekou cestu. Tvar 20, 2001, s. 20–21.
- Málková, I.: O nejmladší poezii české II. Ostrava, Scholaforum 1997, s. 12–13.
- Mlejnek, J.: Libovolné efekty. Mladá fronta Dnes 209, 7. 9. 2001, s. 6.
- Motýl, P.: Několik básnických knížek. In Margiana. Host 2, 1998, s. 83–88.
- Staněk, J.: 90. léta v české poezii. Tvar 11, 2000, s. 12–13.
