= Augustin Pfleger =

German composer

Augustin Pfleger (1635 – after 23 July 1686) was a German Bohemian composer.

== Life ==
Pfleger was born at Schlackenwerth (now Ostrov) and became a court musician at Schlackenwerth. In 1662 he moved to the court of the Duke of Mecklenburg in Güstrow and in 1665 to Gottorf as Kapellmeister at the Schleswig-Holstein court. In 1686 he was again at Schlackenwerth, where he died.

== Works ==
- Psalmi, dialogi et motettae, op.1 (Hamburg, 1661)
- Odae concertantes (Kiel, 1666)

=== German Motets ===
- Ach, dass ich Wassers genug hätte, 5vv, 2 va, ed. in Cw, lii (1938);
- Ach, die Menschen sind umgeben mit viel Krankheit, 5vv, 3 va;
- Ach Herr, du Sohn Davids, 4vv, 2 va, S ii;
- Ach, wenn Christus sich liess finden, 5vv, 3 va, S i;
- Christen haben gleiche Freud, 5vv, 2 vn, S i;
- Der Herr ist ein Heiland, 4vv, 3 va da braccio;
- Der Herr ist gross von Wundertat, 5vv, 2 vn, S ii
- Der Mensch ist nicht geschaffen zum Müssiggang, 4vv, 2 vn, 2 va da braccio;
- Die Ernte ist gross, 5vv, 2 vn, va da gamba, S ii;
- Erbarm dich mein, O Herre Gott, 5vv, 2 vn, 2 va da braccio;
- Es wird das Szepter von Juda nicht entwendet werden, 5vv, 2 vn, 2 va, S i;
- Friede sei mit euch, 4vv, vn, 2 va da gamba;
- Fürchtet den Herrn, 5vv, 2 vn;
- Gestern ist mir zugesaget, 4vv, 2 vn, S i;
- Gott bauet selbst sein Himmelreich, 3vv, 2 vn, S ii
- Gottes Geist bemüht sich sehr, 4vv, 2 vn, 2 va da braccio;
- Gott ist einem König gleich, 4vv, 2 va;
- Herr, haben wir nicht, 4vv, 3 va;
- Herr, wann willst du mich bekehren, 3vv, 3 va;
- Herr, wer wird wohnen in deiner Hütten, 4vv, 3 va;
- Herr, wir können uns nicht nähren, 5vv, 2 va;
- Heute kann man recht verstehen, 4vv, 2 vn, 2 va da braccio;
- Heut freue dich, Christenheit der Heiland, 4vv, 2 vn, 2 va da braccio, S i
- Heut freue dich, Christenheit vom Himmel, 4vv, 2 vn, 2 va da braccio, S i;
- Heut ist Gottes Himmelreich, 5vv, 2 vn, 2 va;
- Hilf, Herr Jesu, lass gelingen, 4vv, 3 va, S i;
- Ich bin das Licht der Welt, 5vv, 3 va;
- Ich bin ein guter Hirte, 3vv, 2 vn, 2 va da gamba or da braccio;
- Ich bin wie ein verirret’ und verloren Schaf, 4vv, 2 vn;
- Ich danke dir, Gott, 5vv, 3 va
- Ich gehe hin zu dem, 5vv, 2 vn, 2 va da gamba;
- Ich sage euch, 4vv, 2 vn, 2 va da braccio;
- Ich suchte des Nachts in meinem Bette, 4vv, 2 vn, 2 va;
- Ich will meinen Mund auftun, 4vv, 2 vn, S ii;
- Im Anfang war das Wort, 4vv, 3 va, S i;
- Jesu, lieber Meister, 4vv, 3 va;
- Jesus trieb ein’ Teufel aus, 5vv, 2 va, S ii;
- Jetzt gehet an die neue Zeit, 5vv, 2 va
- Kommt, denn es ist alles bereit, 4vv, 3 va da braccio;
- Kommt her, ihr Christenleut, 5vv, 2 va, S i;
- Lernet von mir, 4vv, 3 va;
- Mache dich auf, 4vv, 2 vn, S i;
- Meine Tränen sind meine Speise, 4vv, 2 vn, 2 va da braccio;
- Mein Sohn, woll’t Gott, 3vv, 3 va;
- Meister, was soll ich tun, 5vv, 3 va;
- Meister, welches ist das fürnehmste;
- Gebot, 5vv, 3 va;
- Meister, wir wissen, 5vv, 3 va
- Mensch, lebe fromm, 3vv, 2 vn;
- Merket, wie der Herr uns liebet, 4vv, 3 va;
- Mich jammert des Volkes, 5vv, 2 vn;
- Nun gehe ich hin, 5vv, 2 vn;
- O barmherziger Vater, lv, 4 va;
- O Freude, und dennoch Leid, 4vv, 2 vn, 2 va da braccio;
- O, Tod, wie bitter bist du, 4vv, 2 va da braccio;
- Preiset ihr Christen mit Hertzen und Munde, 5vv, 2 vn, 2 va da braccio;
- Saget der Tochter Sion, 4vv, 2 vn, 2 va;
- Schauet an den Liebes Geist, 4vv, 2 vn
- Sieben letzte Worte Jesu Christi am Kreuz;
- Siehe dein Vater, 5vv, 3 va, S ii;
- Sollt nicht das liebe Jesulein, 4vv, 2 va, S i;
- So spricht der Herr, 4vv, 3 va, S ii;
- Triumph! Jubilieret, 6vv, 2 vn, 2 va;
- Und er trat in das Schiff, 5vv, 3 va, S ii;
- Und es war eine Hochzeit zu Cana, 5vv, 2 vn, 2 va, S ii;
- Und Jesus ward verkläret vor seinen Jüngern, 6vv, 2 vn, 2 va, S ii;
- Wahrlich, ich sage dir, 4vv, 2 vn, 2 va da braccio;
- Wahrlich, ich sage euch, 4vv, 3 va
- Weg mit aller Lust und Lachen, 3vv, 2 va, S ii;
- Wenn aber der Tröster kommen wird, 5vv, 2 vn, 2 va da braccio;
- Wenn die Christen sind vermessen, 4vv, 3 va;
- Wenn du es wüsstest, 4vv, 3 va;
- Wer ist wie der Herr unser Gott, 4vv, 3 va;
- Wir müssen alle offenbar werden, 5vv, 3 va;
- Zwar bin ich des Herren Statt, 4vv, 3 va

=== Latin Motets ===
- Ad te clamat cor meum, 1v, 4 insts;
- Confitebor tibi, 4vv, 2 vn, va;
- Cum complerentur dies, 5vv, 2 va, 2 va da gamba;
- Diligam te Domine, 5vv;
- Dominus virtutum nobiscum, 5vv, 2 vn, va, va da gamba;
- Eheu mortalis, 4vv, 3 va;
- Fratres, ego enim accepi a Domino, 3vv, 3 va;
- Inclina Domine, 4vv, 4 va;
- In tribulatione, 4vv, 3 va da gamba;
- Justorum animae in manu Dei sunt, 1v, 4 va;
- Laetabundus et jucundus, 4vv, 2 vn;
- Laetatus sum in his, 4vv, 2 vn, 2 va
- Lauda Jerusalem, 4vv, 2 vn, 2 va;
- Laudate Dominum, omnes gentes, 4vv, 4 insts (2 versions);
- Laudate pueri, 3vv, 3 va da gamba;
- Missus est angelus, 3vv, 2 va;
- Nisi Dominus aedificavit, 2vv, 2 vn;
- O altitudo divitiarum, 5vv, 4 va;
- O divini amor, 1v, 4 va;
- O jucunda dies, 2vv, 2 vn, 2 va da gamba;
- Si quis est cupiens, 1v, 2 vn, 2 va da gamba;
- Veni Sancte Spiritus, 8vv, 10 insts;
- Veni Sancte Spiritus, 4vv, 2 vn, 2 va

=== Lost works ===
- 89 Latin sacred concertos
- 9 German cantatas
- 4 Latin cantatas.

== Sources ==
- Kerala J. Snyder's article in New Grove Dictionary of Music
