= Ostrov (Karlovy Vary District) =

Town in the Czech Republic

- Town
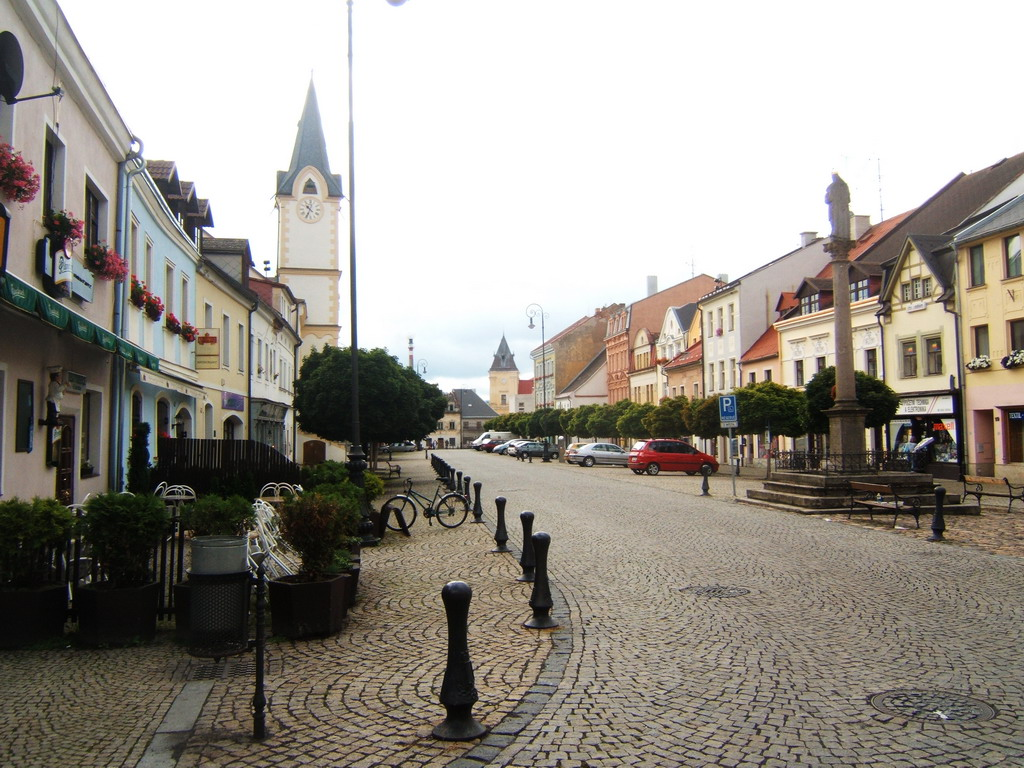
- The square Staré náměstí

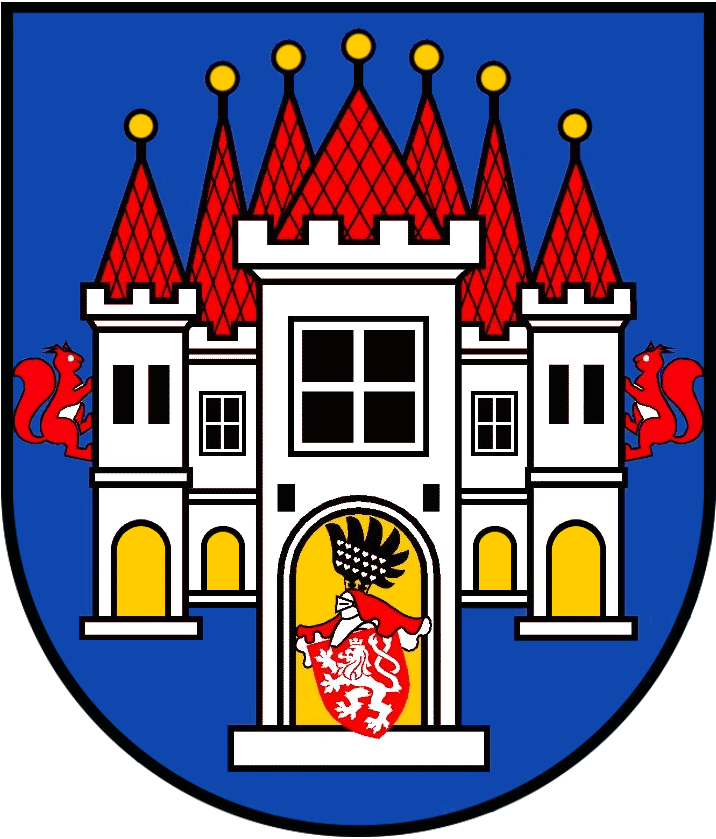
- Flag Coat of arms

- Location in the Czech Republic
- Coordinates: 50°18′30″N 12°56′52″E
- Country: Czech Republic
- Region: Karlovy Vary
- District: Karlovy Vary
- First mentioned: 1269

Government
  - Mayor: Pavel Čekan

Area
  - Total: 50.41 km^{2} (19.46 sq mi)
- Elevation: 398 m (1,306 ft)

Population (2026-01-01)
  - Total: 15,615
  - Density: 309.8/km^{2} (802.3/sq mi)
- Time zone: UTC+1 (CET)
  - Summer (DST): UTC+2 (CEST)
- Postal code: 363 01
- Website: www.ostrov.cz

Ostrov (Czech pronunciation: [ˈostrof]; German: Schlackenwerth) is a town in Karlovy Vary District in the Karlovy Vary Region of the Czech Republic. It has about 16,000 inhabitants. The town proper is located on the Bystřice River in the Sokolov Basin.

Ostrov was probably founded at the beginning of the 13th century. Until the second half of the 20th century, it was a small town, but then it grew significantly due to uranium mining in the region. The historic town centre is well preserved and is protected as an urban monument zone. The main historical landmark of Ostrov is the Ostrov Castle. However, the most important monument is the Red Tower of Death, which is designated a UNESCO World Heritage Site (as part of the Ore Mountain Mining Region) and a national cultural monument.

== Administrative division ==
Ostrov consists of 12 municipal parts (in brackets population according to the 2021 census):

- Ostrov (14,409)
- Arnoldov (1)
- Dolní Žďár (232)
- Hanušov (0)
- Hluboký (102)
- Horní Žďár (235)
- Kfely (234)
- Květnová (166)
- Liticov (1)
- Maroltov (20)
- Mořičov (68)
- Vykmanov (1,203)

== Etymology ==
The original name of the first settlement was Zlaukowerde (meaning "Slauko's island"), which changed into the German name Schlackenwerth. In 1331, the name Ostrov (i.e. 'island' in Czech) was first used, in a charter of King John of Bohemia.

== Geography ==
Ostrov is located about 9 kilometres (6 mi) northeast of Karlovy Vary. Most of the municipal territory lies in the Sokolov Basin, but it also extends to the Doupov Mountains in the east and to the Ore Mountains in the north. The highest point is the Hlaváč mountain at 908 m (2,979 ft) above sea level. The town is situated at the confluence of the Bystřice River and the stream Jáchymovský potok; the Ohře flows just outside the territory of Ostrov. The southern part of the municipal territory is rich in fishponds.

== History ==
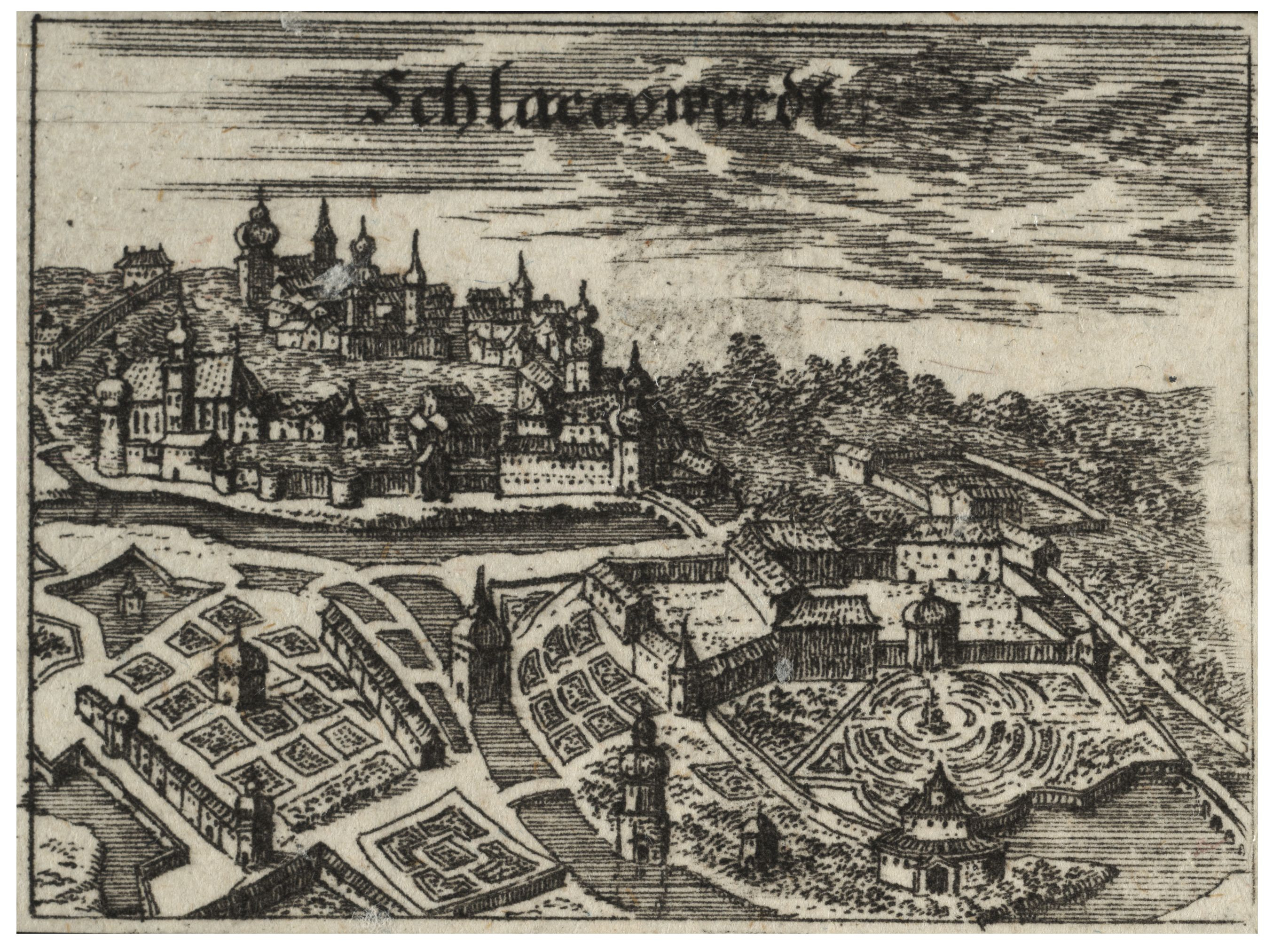
Ostrov in the 17th century

Ostrov was probably founded by Slauko I Hrabišic at the beginning of the 13th century. A hoax from the second half of the 13th century mentioned the Church of Saint James the Great in 1208, but the church was built in 1224–1226. The first trustworthy written mention of Ostrov is from 1269.

During the rule of King Ottokar II, the settlement became a royal town. This lasted until the 15th century, when the Schlick family bought the town. In 1625, the town was acquired by Julius Henry, Duke of Saxe-Lauenburg. He decided to make Ostrov the residence of his house. He had rebuilt Ostrov Castle and extended, and founded a Piarist monastery with a Latin school.

Today's appearance of the old town was determined mainly by construction activities after the last great fire in 1866. From the 19th century to 1918, Ostrov belonged to one of the branches of the imperial House of Habsburg, the Grand Dukes of Tuscany. In the 19th century, the town was industrialised. A smelter, a cardboard factory and a porcelain factory were established.

After World War I, being located in the historic region of Bohemia, Ostrov became part of newly established Czechoslovakia, although it had a German majority and only 7% of the Czech population. At the beginning of World War II, during the occupation of Czechoslovakia by Nazi Germany, the Czech population was forced to leave the town. The castle was turned into a Nazi concentration camp, a subcamp of the Flossenbürg concentration camp, whose prisoners were mostly Poles and Russians. In April 1945, most of the remaining prisoners were deported by the Germans to the Leitmeritz concentration camp. After the war, the German population was expelled in accordance with the Potsdam Agreement and replaced by Czechs.

The population of Ostrov then multiplied as people were moved to work in the uranium mines in nearby Jáchymov. The extensive housing blocks from the 1950s forming the new part of Ostrov are considered one of the best examples of socialist realism architecture in the Czech Republic.

== Demographics ==
Historical population

Year	Pop.	±%
1869	3,664	—
1880	4,313	+17.7%
1890	4,420	+2.5%
1900	4,577	+3.6%
1910	4,810	+5.1%

Year	Pop.	±%
1921	4,670	−2.9%
1930	5,135	+10.0%
1950	4,047	−21.2%
1961	17,136	+323.4%
1970	18,519	+8.1%

Year	Pop.	±%
1980	19,450	+5.0%
1991	17,872	−8.1%
2001	17,451	−2.4%
2011	17,859	+2.3%
2021	16,671	−6.7%

Source: Censuses

== Economy ==
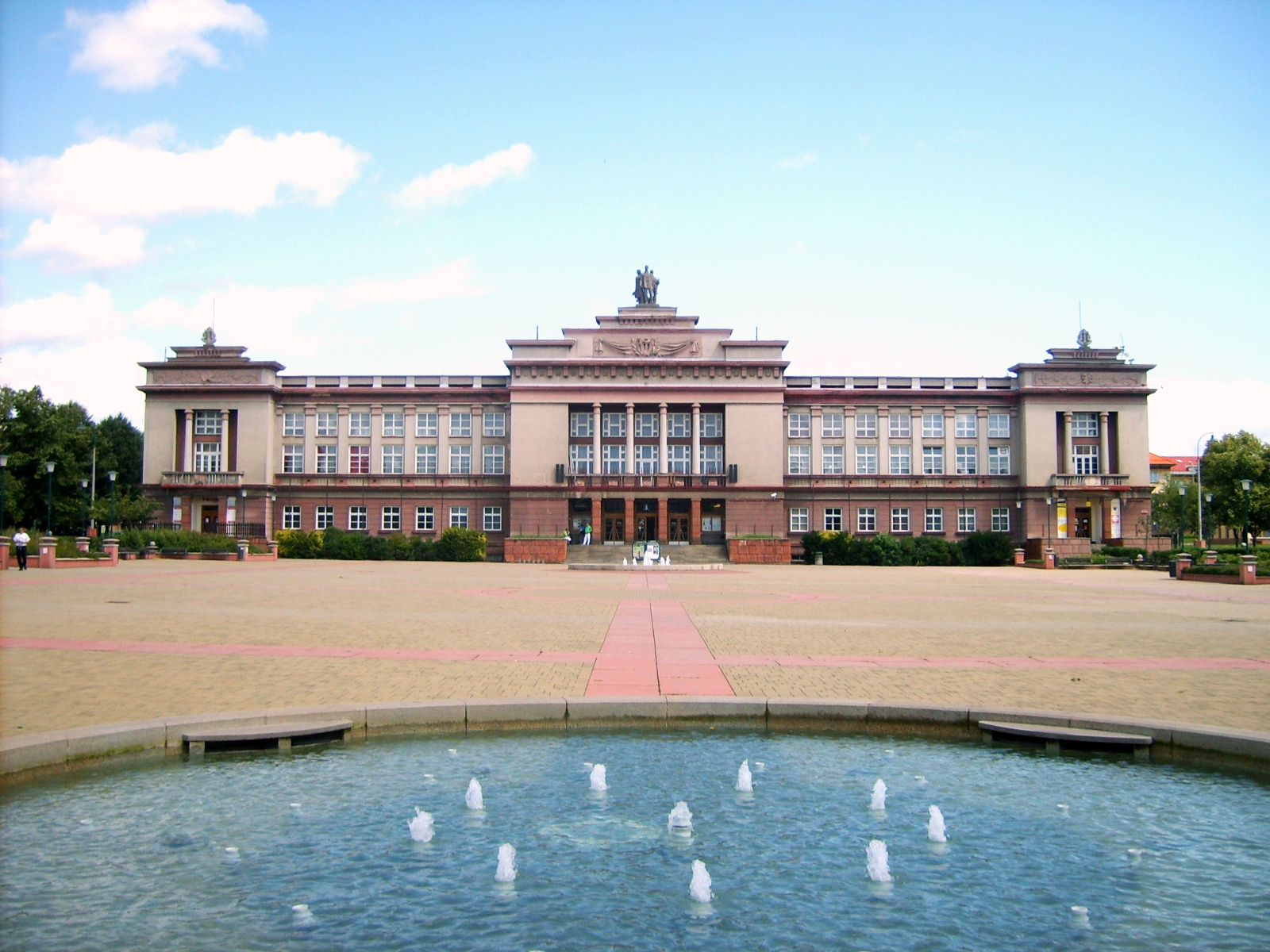
Community Centre on the square Mírové náměstí

From 1960, the town was known for production of trolleybuses under the Škoda brand. However, the production ended in 2004.

The largest employer based in the town is Witte Access Technology, a branch of Witte Automotive. It produces painted door handles for automotive industry. The traditional industry has been the production of cardboard since 1889. Since 1992, the tradition has been continued by the Papos company, which employs around 150 employees.

== Transport ==
The I/13 road (part of the European route E442) from Karlovy Vary to Liberec runs through the town.

Ostrov is located on the interregional railway line Prague–Cheb.

== Sights ==
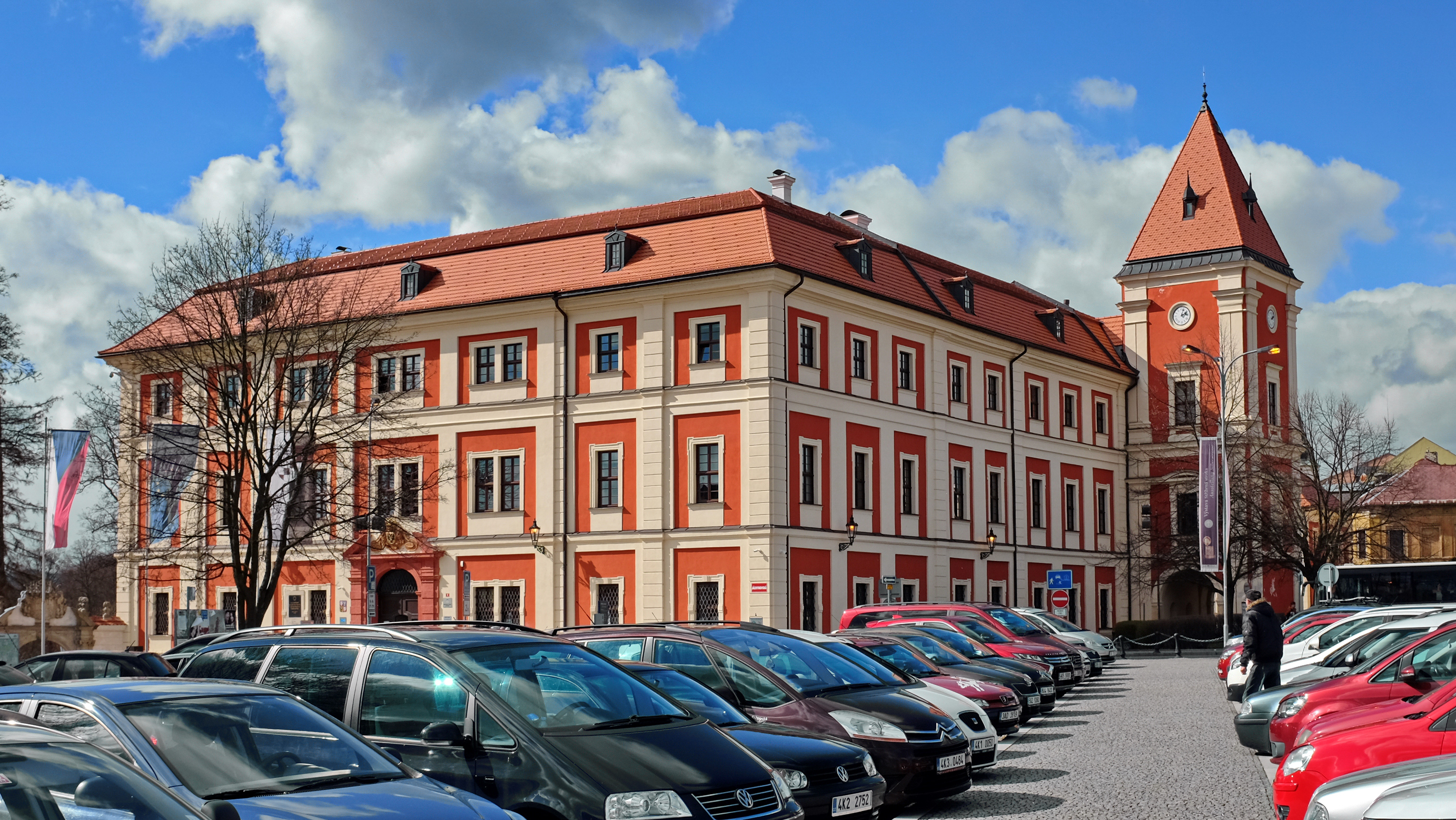
Ostrov Castle

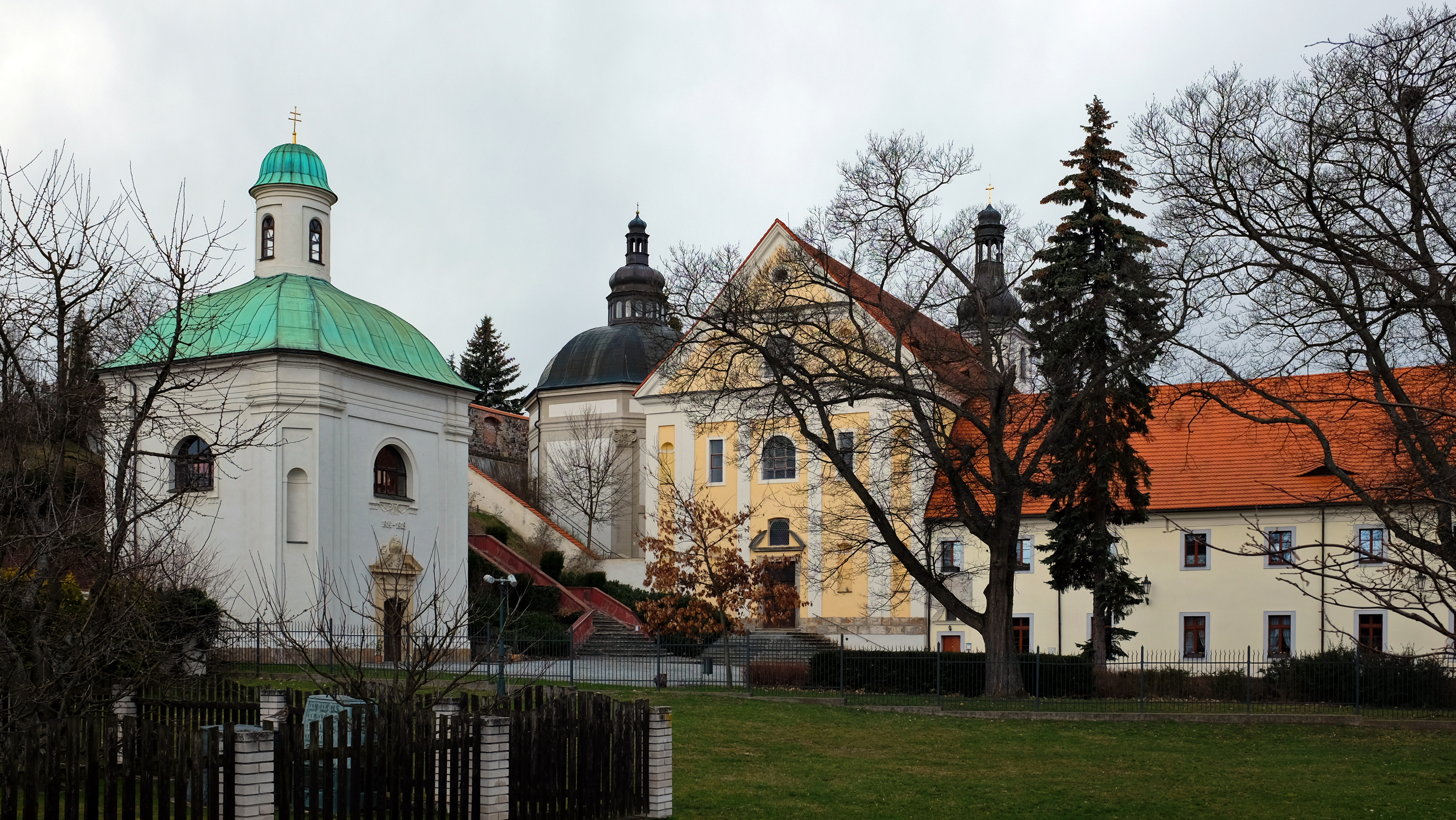
Monastery complex

The main landmark of the historic centre is the Ostrov Castle. It is an extensive complex of buildings with a castle park. An old guarding castle was rebuilt into a Renaissance residence at the turn of the 15th and 16th centuries. In the 1640s, it was rebuilt and extended, and another castle building (the so-called Palace of Princes) was added at the end of the 17th century. Today the main building with a roofed courtyard houses the town hall, expositions of the history of the castle and the porcelain production in the town, and the information centre. The Palace of Princes serves as the town library, its Václav Havel Orangery (named after Václav Havel) is used for exhibitions and concerts.

The English-style castle park was originally a formal castle garden founded in 1625. In the centre of the park is the baroque summer house from 1673–1679. It houses a branch of the Karlovy Vary Art Gallery with exhibitions of mostly contemporary art and an exhibition of European porcelain.

The monastery complex is located next to the castle park. The Piarist monastery was founded in 1644. The early Baroque complex includes the Church of the Annunciation from 1666–1673, the funeral Chapel of Saint Anne from 1644, the Chapel of Saint Florian from 1692–1693, and the Chapel of the Virgin Mary of Einsiedeln from 1709–1710. There are various expositions in the church and chapels, the convent building is closed to the public.

The Church of Saint Michael and Mary, the Virgin Most Faithful dates from the late 13th century. This parish church was reconstructed after fires between 1567 and 1572, and then rebuilt again in 1607–1609 and 1636. Several Renaissance tombstones have been preserved, the most valuable of which is the tombstone from 1521 with a Schlick epitaph.

The Church of Saint James the Great from the 1220s was originally a Romanesque parish church. In the 16th century, it became a cemetery church. At the beginning of the 17th century, it was reconstructed in the early Baroque style.

Red Tower of Death is a red-brick tower that served as a sorting house for uranium ore in Vykmanov work camp in 1951–1956. Today it is a national cultural monument and, since 2019, it has been a UNESCO World Heritage Site as a part of the Ore Mountain Mining Region.

== Notable people ==
- Joachim Andreas von Schlick (1569–1621), nobleman
- Augustin Pfleger (1635–1686), composer
- Johann Caspar Ferdinand Fischer (1662–1746), organist, Hofkapellmeister and composer
- Johann Josef Loschmidt (1821–1895), physicist and chemist; attended the local school in 1833–1837
- Vilma Cibulková (born 1963), actress
- Radim Rulík (born 1965), ice hockey coach
- Horst Siegl (born 1969), footballer
- Petr Maděra (born 1970), writer
- Lukáš Bauer (born 1977), cross-country skier
- Jiří Štoček (born 1977), chess grandmaster
- Zbyněk Drda (born 1987), singer

== Twin towns – sister cities ==
Ostrov is twinned with:

- Rastatt, Germany
- Wunsiedel, Germany

== Gallery ==
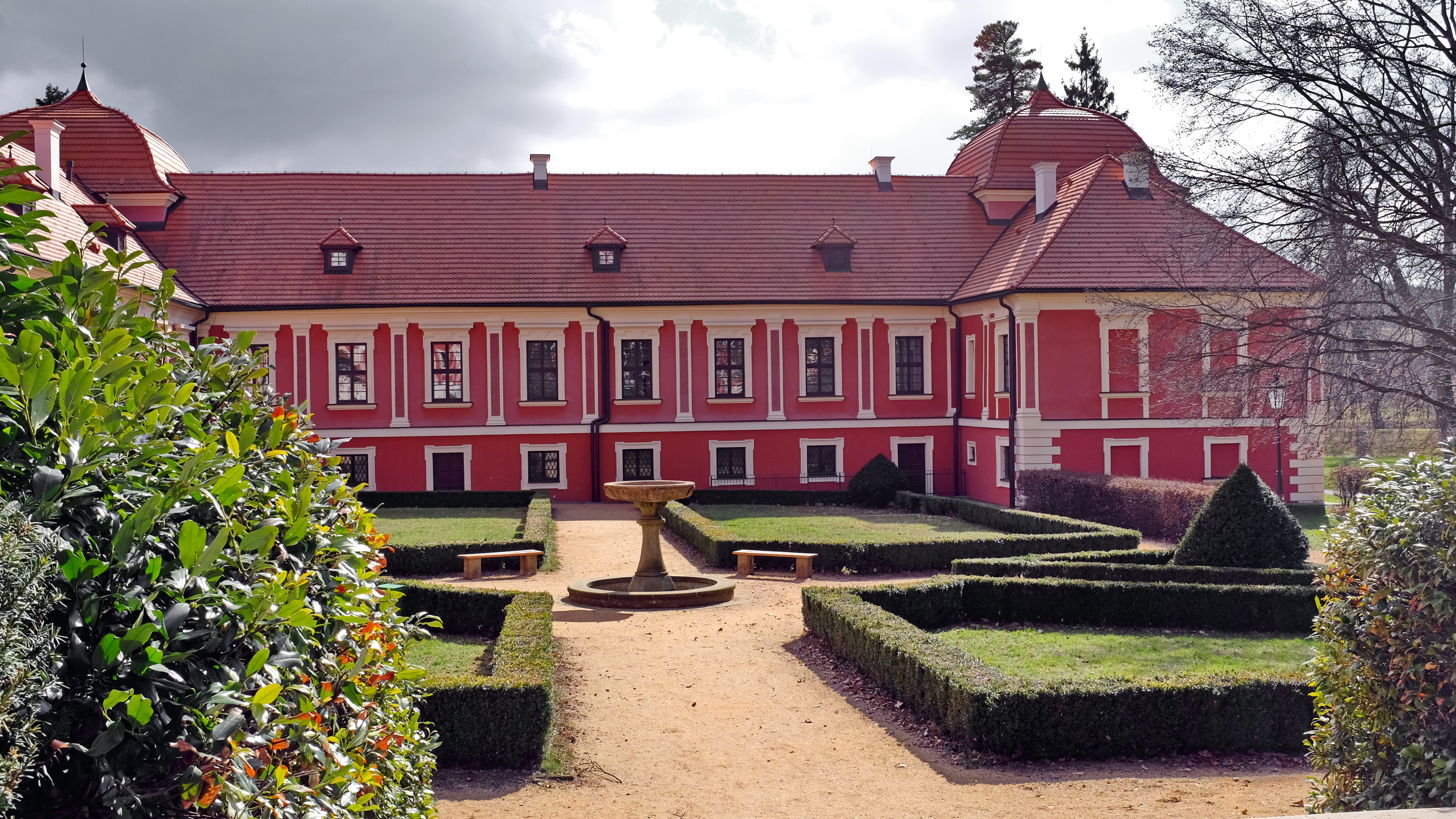
Palace of Princes

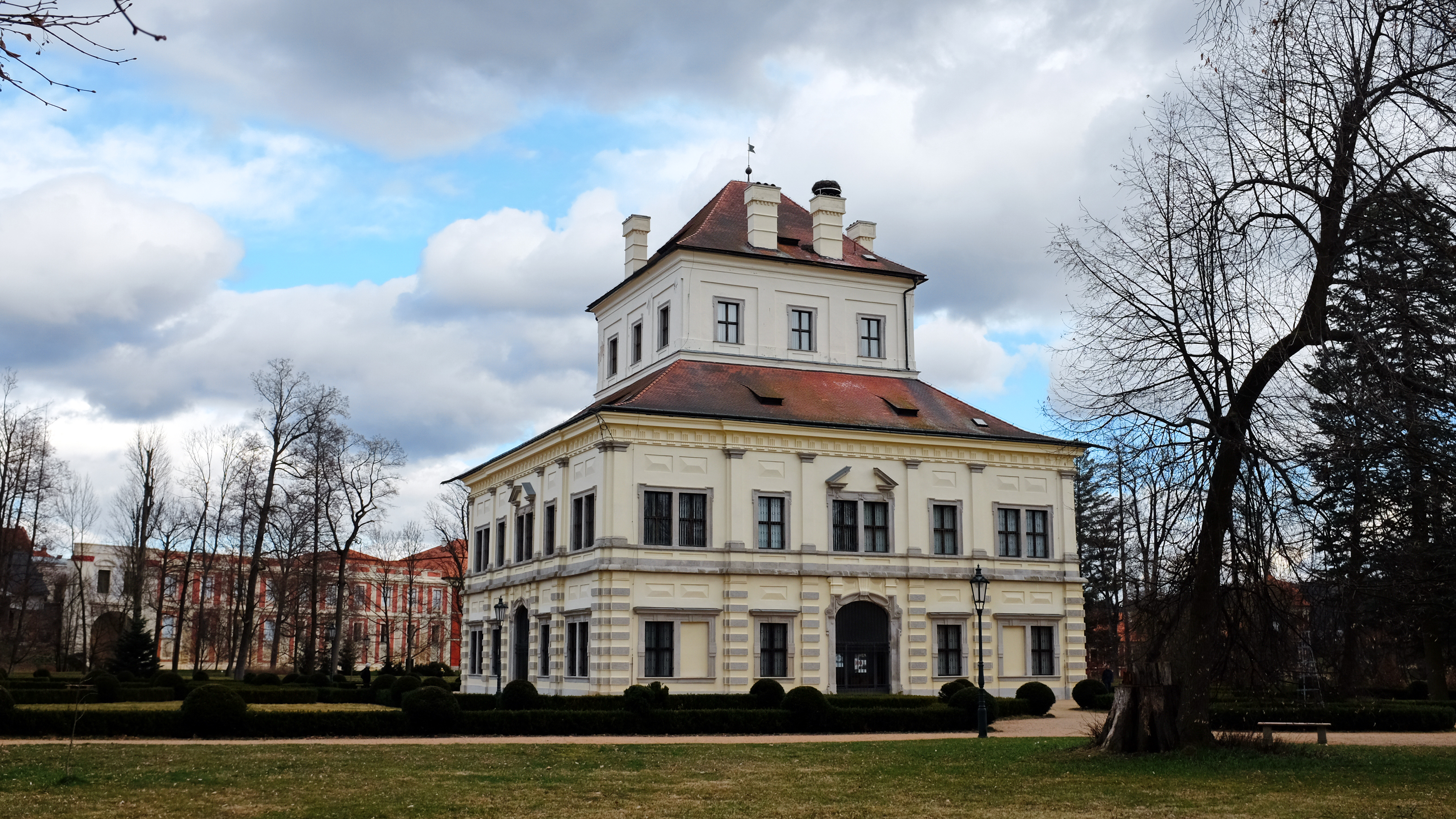
Summer house in the castle park

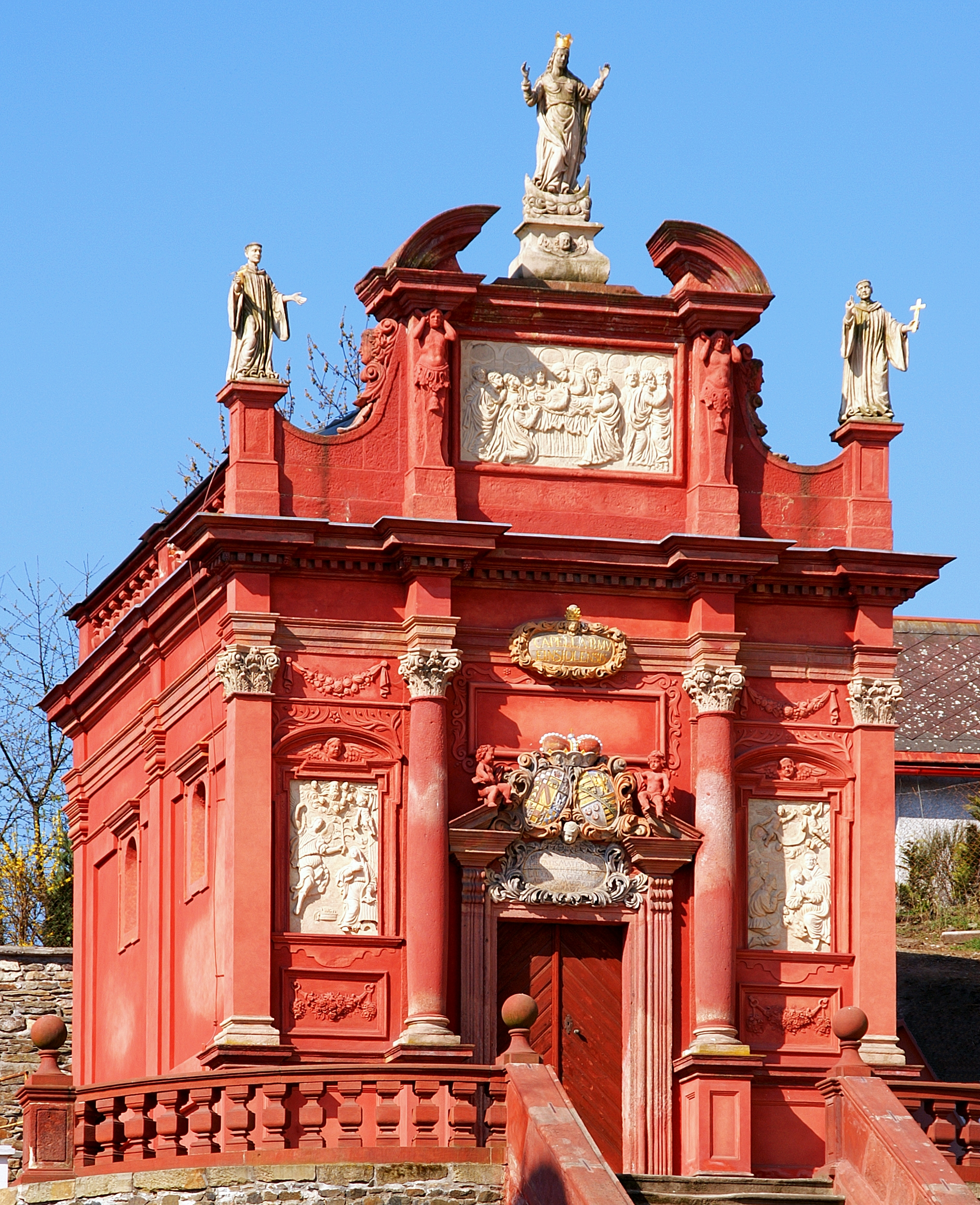
Chapel of the Virgin Mary of Einsiedeln

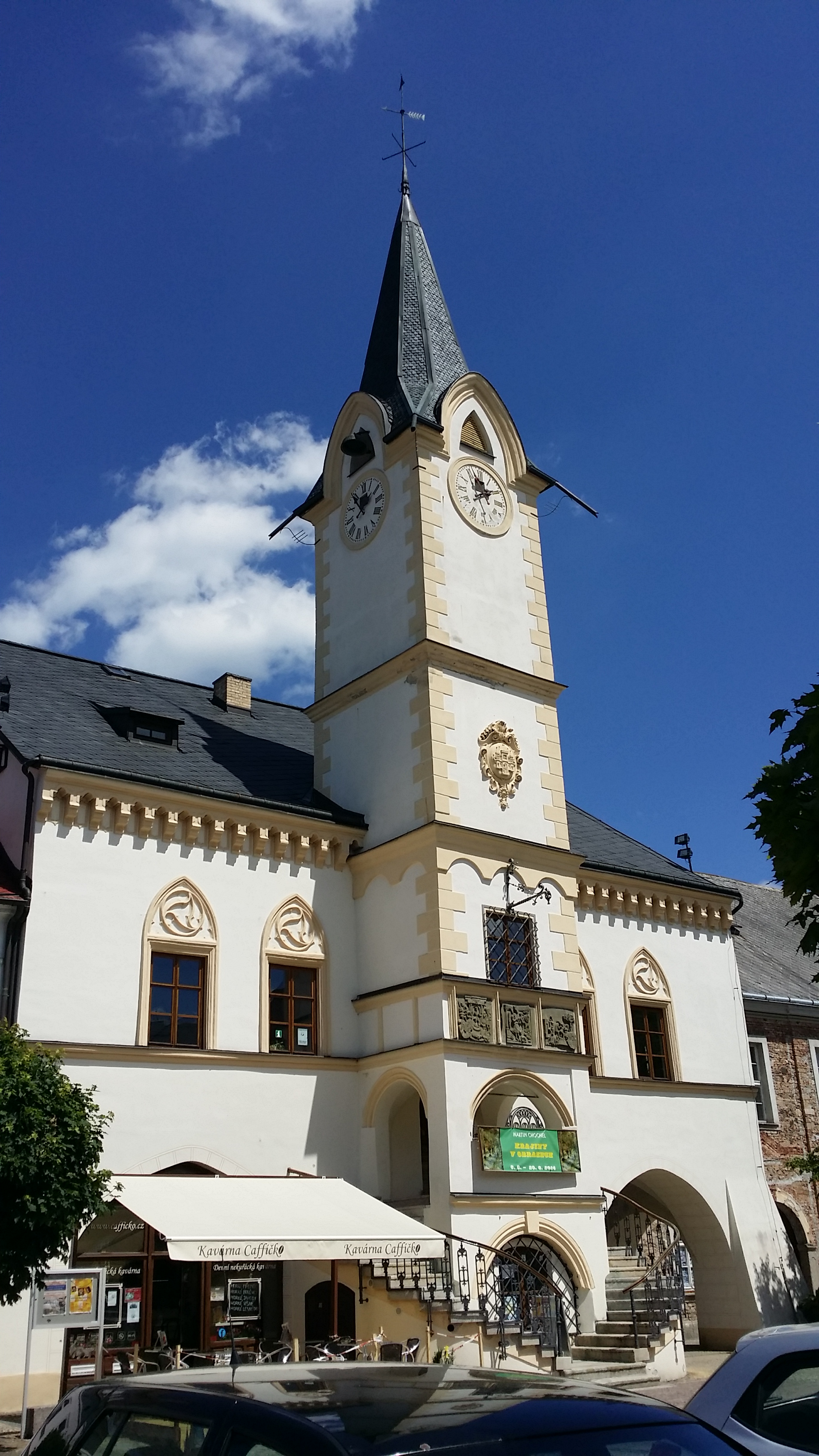
Old Town Hall

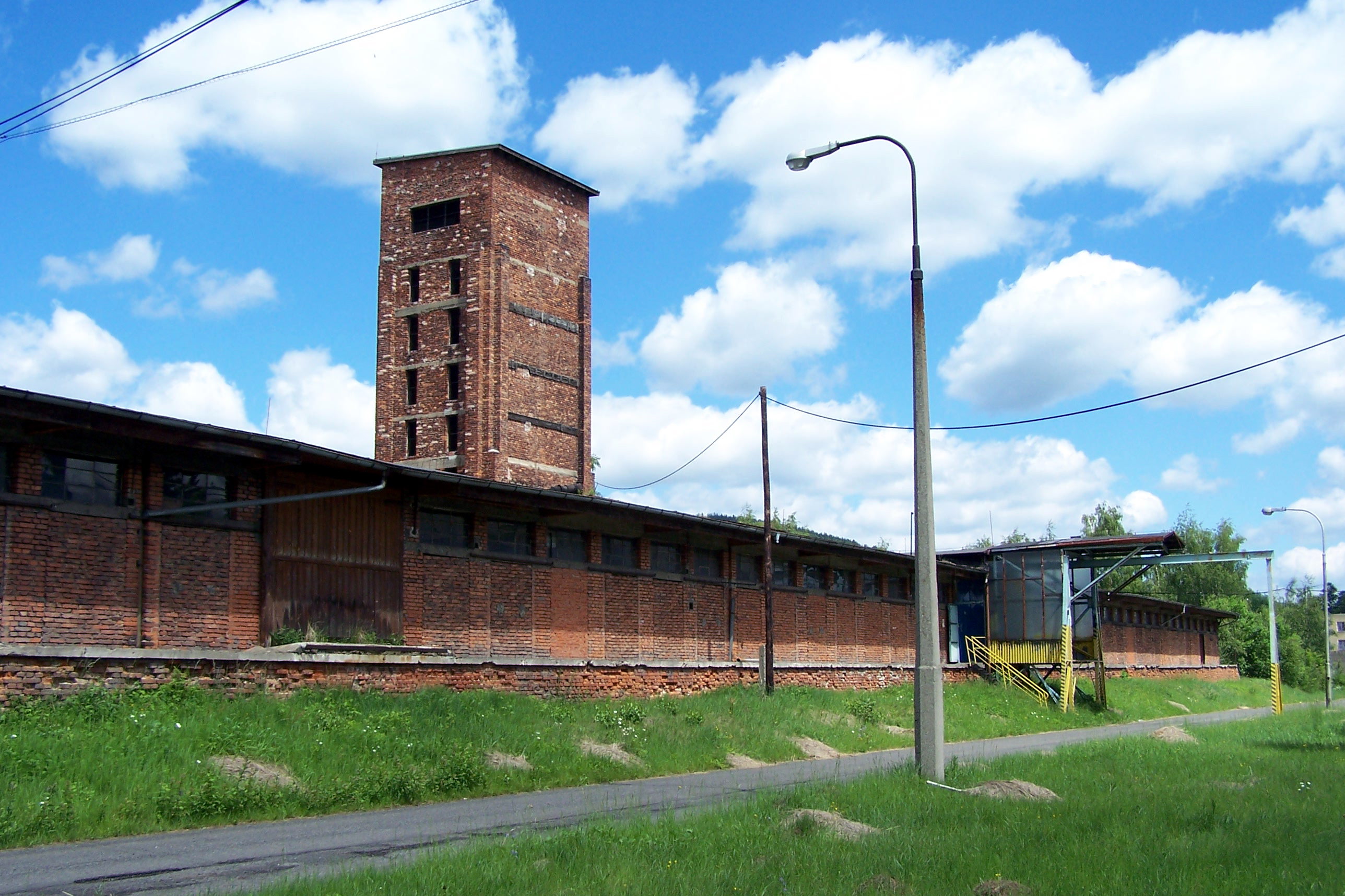
Red Tower of Death in Vykmanov

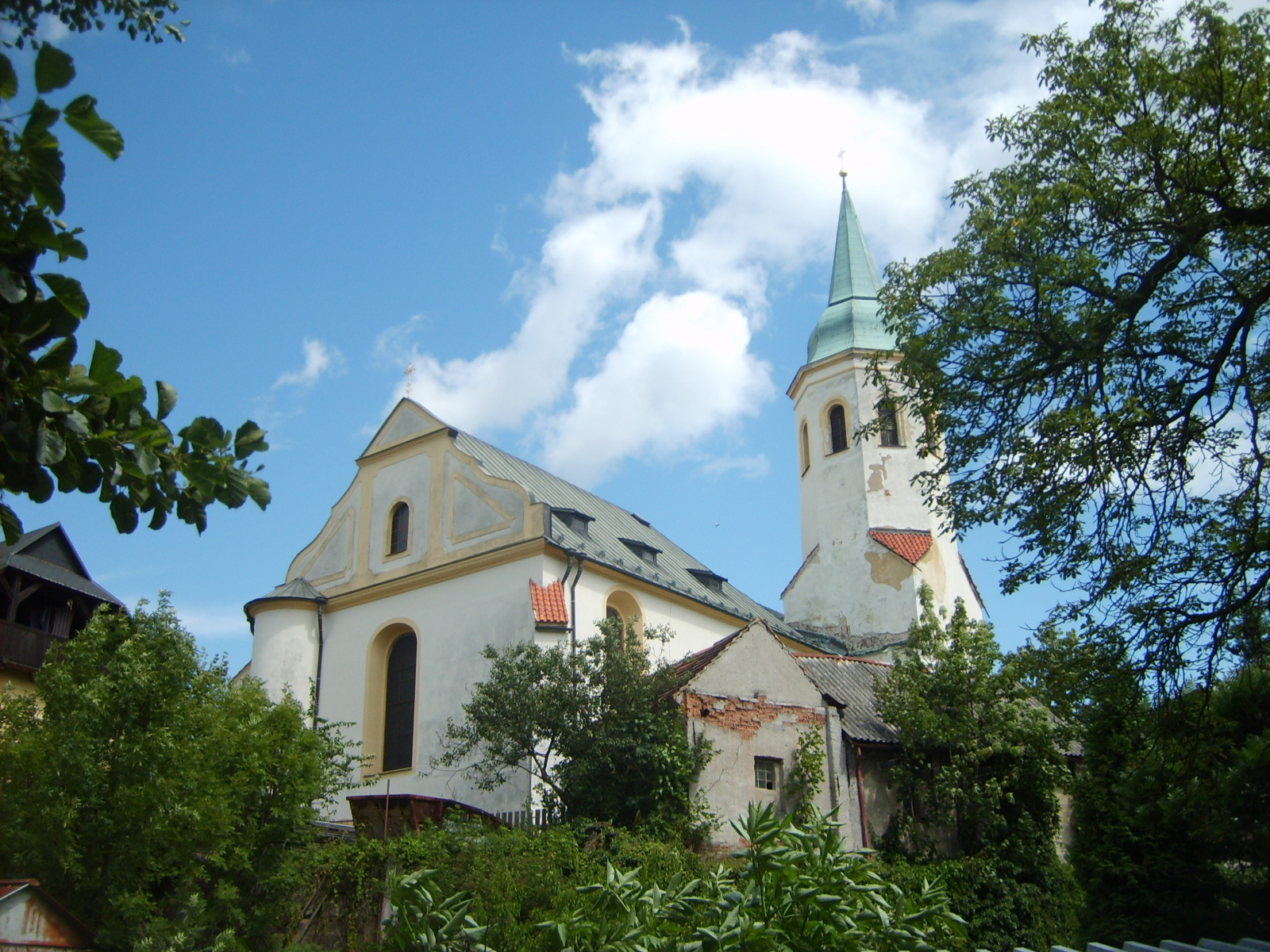
Church of Saint Michael and Mary, the Virgin Most Faithful
