= Witte Automotive =

German automobile components supplier

- Type: German Limited (GmbH)
- Industry: Automotive industry
- Founded: 1899; 127 years ago
- Headquarters: Velbert, Germany
- Key people: Rainer Gölz; Kersten Tom Janik; Benedikt Schultheiß; Tobias Sprute
- Revenue: €870.67 Mio. (2024)
- Number of employees: 5,171 (2024)
- Website: www.witte-automotive.com

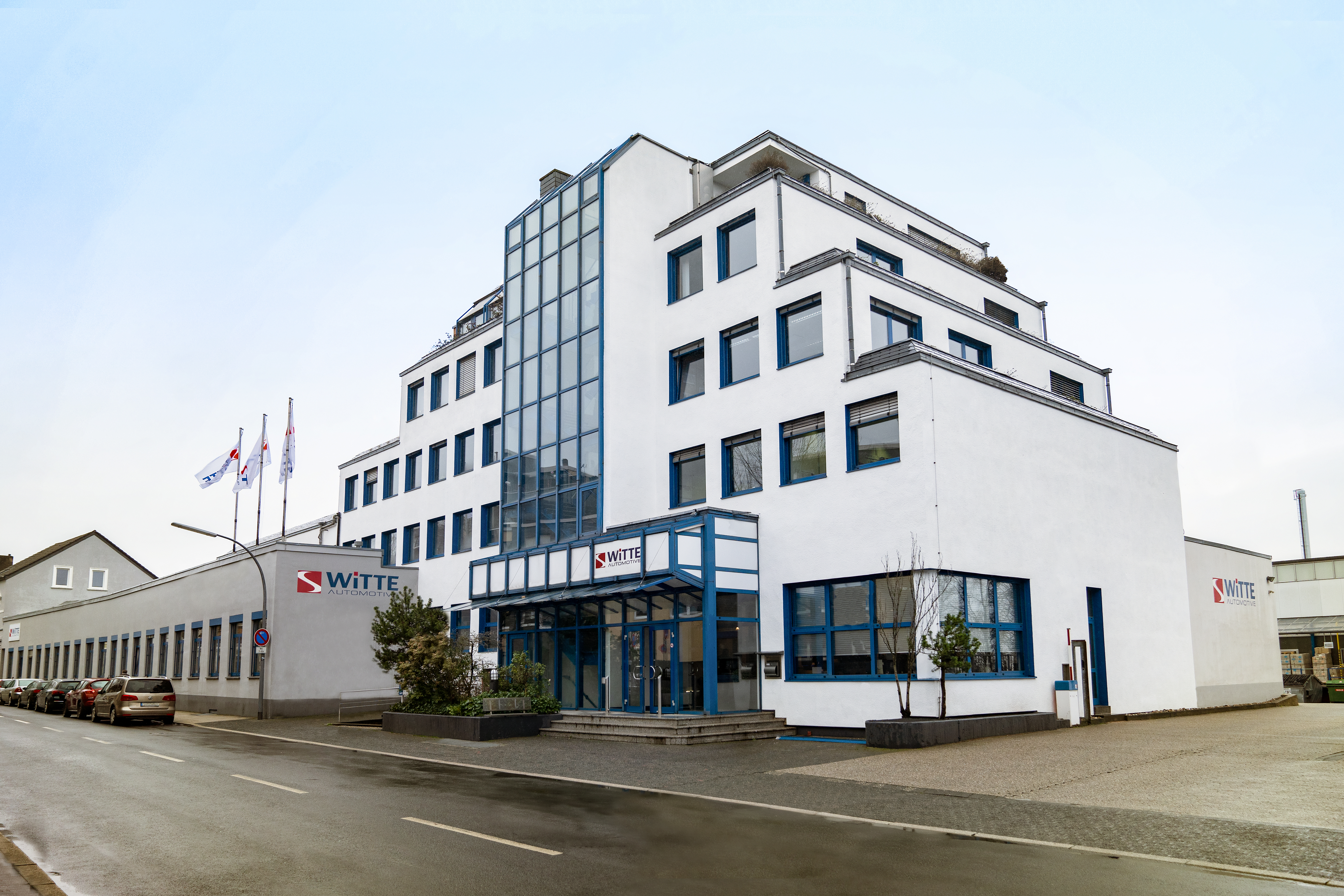
Headquarters in Velbert

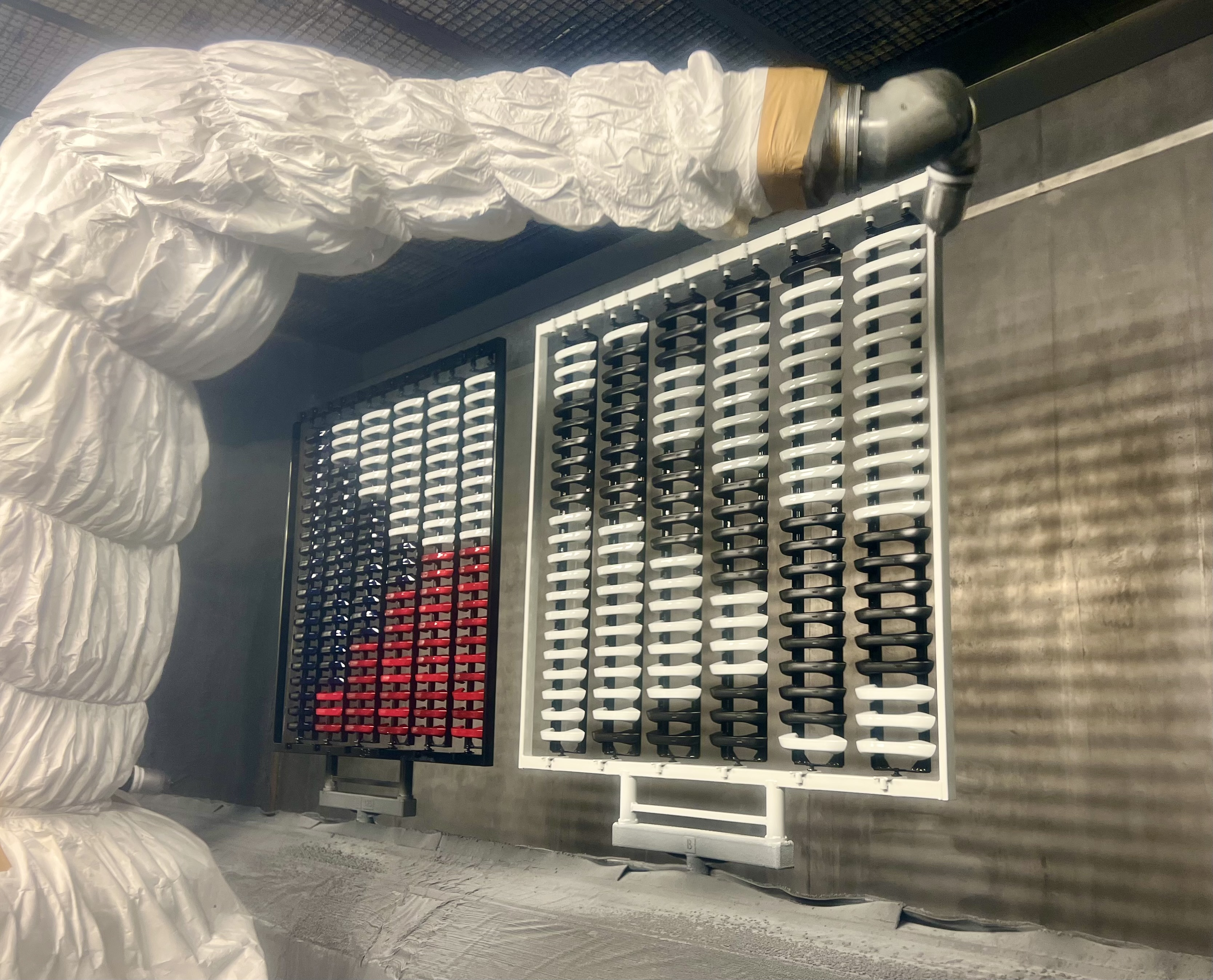
Paint shop at the plant in Ostrov, Czech Republic

Witte Automotive is a German automotive supplier of mechatronic locking systems for car doors, tailgates, interiors, and seats.

The company is headquartered in Velbert, Germany. Outside of Europe, the company operates under the name Vast Automotive Group. As of 2024 financial year, Witte generated revenue of €870.67 million.

== History ==
Witte was founded in 1899 by Ewald Witte for the production of suitcase locks. Following the Currency Reform of 1948, the family-owned company began manufacturing locks and fittings for the automotive industry.

In 1992, the company established its subsidiary, Witte Nejdek, spol. s. r.o., in the Czech Republic. From 1993, Witte expanded its international business activities through joint ventures in Brazil, China, Japan, South Korea and India. In 1995, Witte Automotive acquired a majority stake in Riewer Kunststoff GmbH in Bitburg. The company also took over Krosta Metalltechnik GmbH in Velbert in 1996.

In collaboration with the Prinz Group in Stromberg, the joint venture Prinz Witte GmbH was formed in 1999 to produce and distribute products for the automotive industry. In 2000, the then Witte-Velbert and the Strattec Security Corporation, Milwaukee, founded the Vast Automotive Group (Vast = Vehicle Access Systems Technology), which Adac Automotive joined in 2006.

In 2008, the Velbert-based company Friedr. Fingscheidt GmbH was acquired. In addition to its headquarters in Velbert, Fingscheidt had a production facility in Wülfrath, where, among other things, the Mercedes star for Mercedes-Benz cars is manufactured. The same year, the Power Products division of Delphi Automotive was acquired.

In October 2008, a new subsidiary of Witte Automotive, Witte Automotive Bulgaria EOOD, was established in the Bulgarian city of Ruse. In May 2010, Witte Automotive began producing vehicle components in Ruse, with production capacities at the Ruse site being further expanded in the following years. After purchasing land in early 2013, the foundation stone for the new production plant was laid on 11 October 2013, and the plant officially opened on 1 October 2014.

On 13 May 2016, another plant was opened in Ostrov, Czech Republic, where painted exterior door handles, among other things, are manufactured. In the same year, the company Witte Automotive Sweden AB was founded in Gothenburg, Sweden.

Witte Digital, a business unit developing systems for digital car unlocking such as smartphone-based access was established in 2018. In the same period, WITTE Stromberg was sold to Alko Kober SE and renamed Prinz Kinematics GmbH. In 2021, Witte acquired the Czech company IMA, a developer of electronic identification systems.

On 30th June 2023, it was announced that Witte would become the sole owner of the Vast Automotive Group in China and Japan, taking over Vast Automotive Group's shares in Minda-Vast, the joint venture established in 2015 with the Indian supplier Spark Minda. Meanwhile, Adac Automotive took over the unit in Brazil, and Strattec assumed operations of Vast in South Korea. In September 2023, Witte Automotive further expanded into Eastern Europe by acquiring a majority stake in Forez Bulgaria, a company for manufacturing plastic injection moulded parts. The company was renamed Witte Injection Molding Bulgaria, and in July 2024, it was fully acquired and integrated into Witte Automotive Bulgaria. In 2025, Witte expanded its operations in Ostrov by opening a new plant, , doubling its floor space in Czechia to over 50,000 m². In the same year, Witte doubled the building area of its plant in Ruse, Bulgaria, by around 25,000 m² with a new building connected to the existing plant.

In March 2026, WITTE Automotive completed the acquisition of the Helbako Group, which operates in the field of electronic systems. The acquisition involved locations in Heiligenhaus and Timișoara (Romania) with around 250 employees.

== Corporate structure ==
The Witte Automotive GmbH is the parent company of the Witte Group and is based in Velbert. In the 2024 financial year, the Group generated revenue of €870.67 million and employed on average 5,171 people.

=== Subsidiaries ===
In addition to the parent company Witte Automotive, the Group also includes the following subsidiaries:

==== Germany ====
- Witte Niederberg: A partner for stamped products and zinc die casting. It was formerly known as Friedr. Fingscheidt GmbH and merged with Krosta Metalltechnik in 2011.
- Witte Bitburg: A competence centre for plastic components. It was formerly known as Riewer Kunststoff.

Witte Automotive also has customer offices in Wolfsburg, Böblingen and Munich.

==== Czech Republic ====
- Witte Nejdek, spol. s r.o.: Product development, sales, plastics processing, assembly and aftermarket operations.
- Witte Access Technology s.r.o.: Manufacturing and assembly of exterior door-handle systems.
- Witte Paint Application, s.r.o.: Painting of automotive components.
- Institut Mikroelektronických Aplikací (IMA): Development of electronic identification and access-control systems.

Witte operates three manufacturing plants in the Czech Republic, one in Nejdek and two in Ostrov, alongside development offices in Plzeň and Prague.

==== Other European countries ====
- Witte Automotive Bulgaria EOOD: An assembly and development centre that mainly serves the market in South-East Europe.
- Witte Automotive Sweden AB: Responsible for sales and product development in Northern Europe.
- Helbako: Active in the development, industrialization, and production of electronic systems and control units; with locations in Heiligenhaus (Germany) and Timișoara (Romania); part of the group since spring 2026.

==== Asia and North America ====
- Witol Automotive Fasteners (Kunshan) Co. Ltd.
- Witol Automotive USA Inc.
- Vast China Co., Ltd. in Taicang
- Vast (Jingzhou) Co., Ltd.
- Vehicle Access Systems Technology LLC Japan branch
- Minda VAST Access Systems PVT Ltd.

In North and South America, Witte continues to cooperate with the North American companies Adac Automotive and Strattec.

== Products ==
The Witte Group develops, manufactures, and distributes mechanical, mechatronic, and electronic locking and actuation systems, as well as tolerance compensation systems and other products made from metal and plastic. The group supplies to automotive manufacturers and system suppliers. The company's main products include locking and latching systems, vehicle access systems, and seat safety systems.

Among other things, subsidiary Witte Digital offers the Flinkey unlocking system, which allows car doors to be unlocked using a smartphone. This system can also be retrofitted to older model vehicles.

Another division of the company produces the Witol tolerance compensation system. The Witol system can be used to avoid stress and deformation when screwing components together, for example, when connecting car bodies and high-voltage batteries, by automatically levelling out tolerances in the axial and radial directions. This leads to a reduction in assembly time and rework.

The acquisition of Helbako in 2026 added in-house electronics manufacturing capabilities to the company’s operations, which expanded its existing electronics development capabilities, for example for control units and other electronic systems.

== Awards (selection) ==
In 2013, Witte Automotive won the Volkswagen Group Award, which honours the 21 best suppliers of the Volkswagen Group every year. Witte locations have also been awarded the Ford Q1 certification for Ford suppliers. In 2024, Witte received the Lean & Green Management Award in the Automotive category in Bulgaria.

== Sustainability ==
The company is active in the Catena-X Automotive Network e.V., an association for collaboration between automotive industry companies and suppliers with the aim to enhance transparency and sustainability throughout the value chain. Additionally, in 2022, the company established a materials recycling loop with BASF, Mercedes-Benz, and Pyrum Innovations AG, using pyrolysis oil from old tyres and biogas from organic waste to produce plastics. The partners were awarded the Materialica Design and Technology Award in 2022 for this recycling loop.
