= Ostrov Castle =

Castle in Karlovy Vary Region, Czech Republic

- Ostrov, Czech Republic
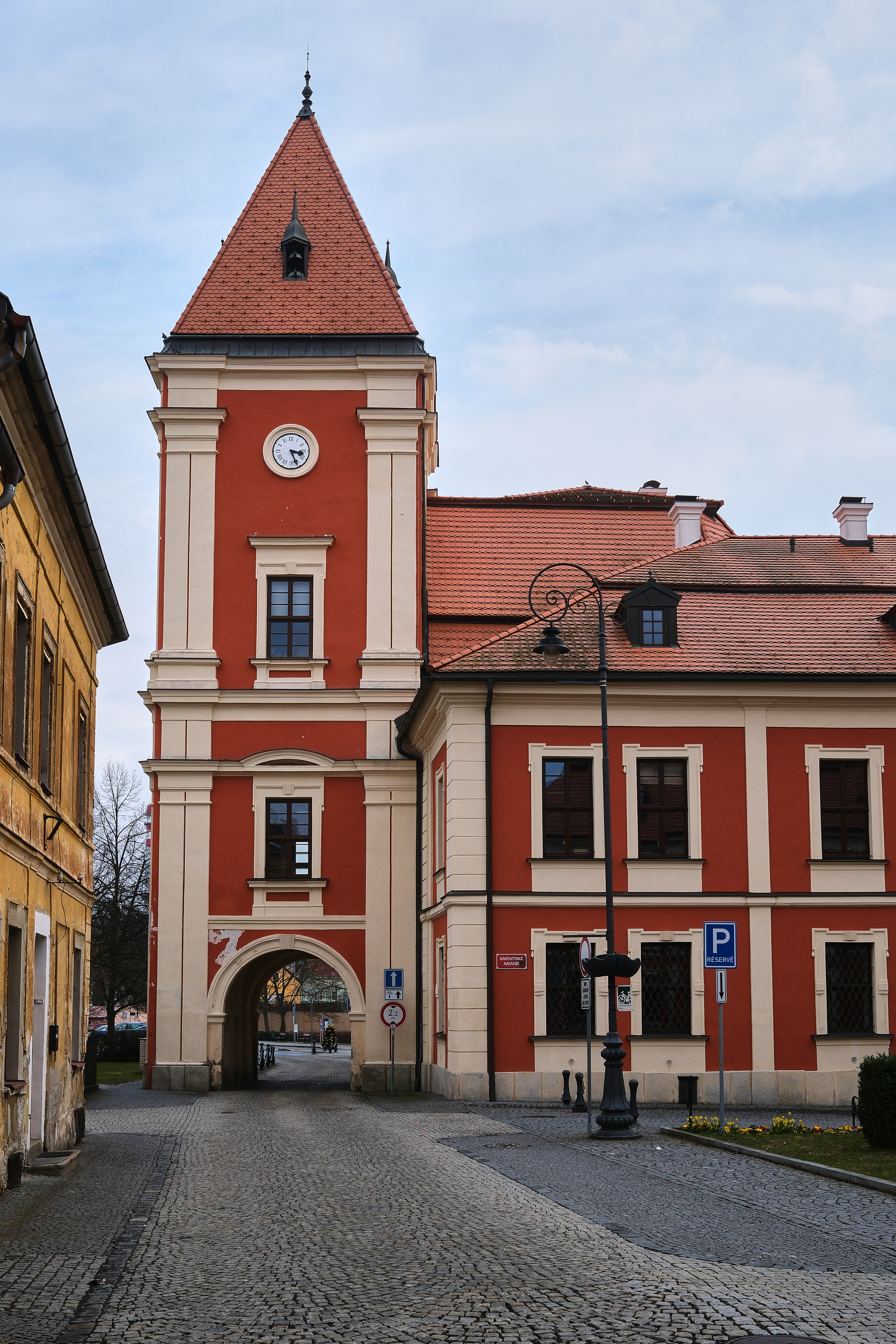
- South side

Site information
- Type: Castle

Location
- Coordinates: 50°18′10″N 12°56′27″E

Site history
- Built: 15th century

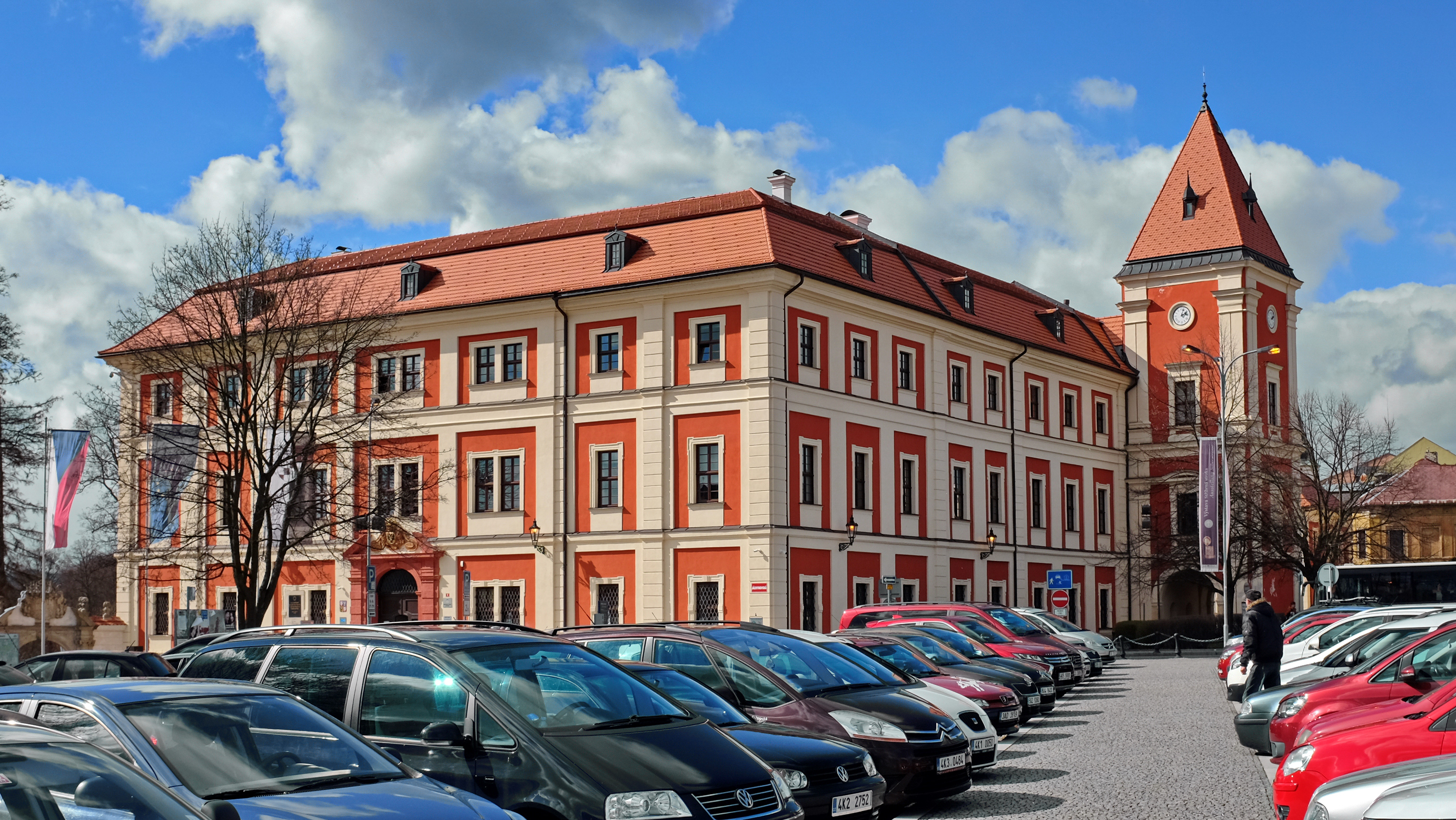
Lauenburg castle, the central part

Ostrov Castle (Czech: zámek Ostrov, German: Schloss Schlackenwerth) is a castle in Ostrov in the Karlovy Vary Region of the Czech Republic. It dates back to the 15th century, but has been reconstructed into baroque palace with gardens under the Saxe-Lauenburg and Baden-Baden families. In the 19th century, it belonged to the Tuscan branch of Habsburg family. Nowadays, it houses municipal offices, a library, a gallery and museum. Its gardens were once considered the most famous of Bohemia.

== History ==
=== House of Saxe-Lauenburg ===
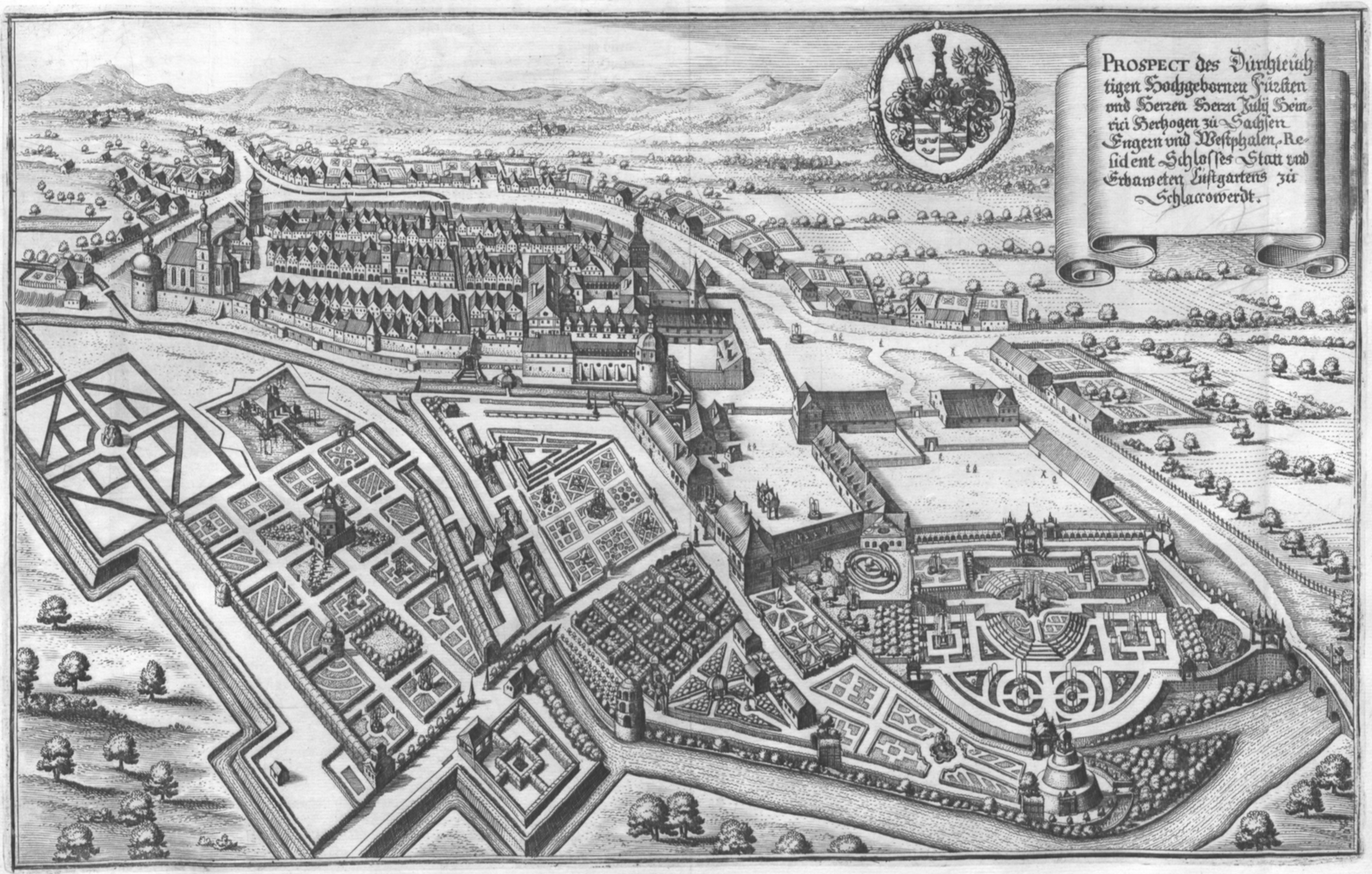
Ostrov castle and town by Merian in 1650

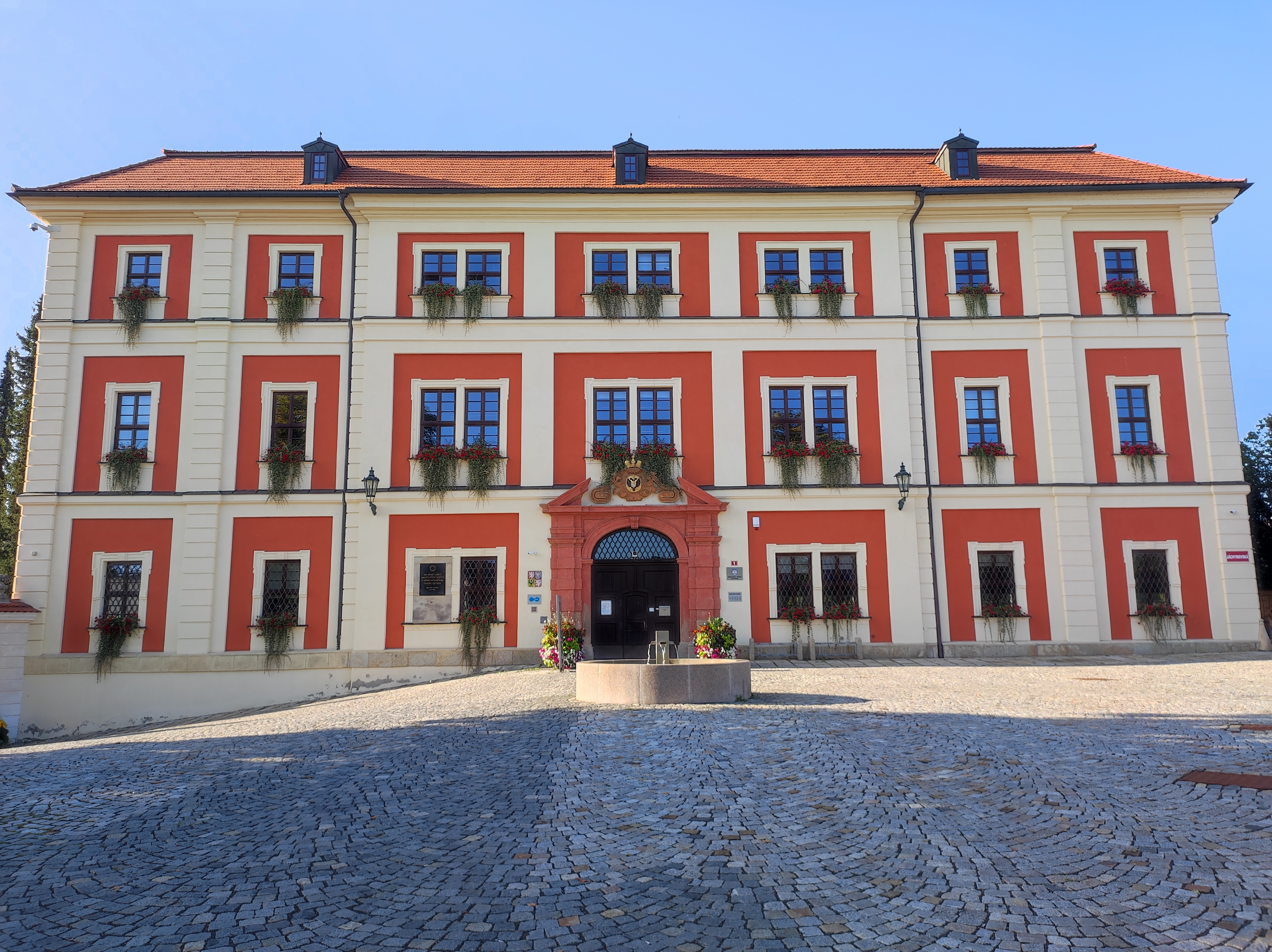
Front of the Lauenburg castle

Ostrov Castle was constructed by the Count of Schlick in the 15th century. From then the castle belonged to the Schlick family until the Battle of White Mountain in 1620, when their grounds were confiscated by Emperor Ferdinand II (1578–1637). In 1623, the emperor granted the Ostrov Castle and its surrounding estate to Julius Henry, Duke of Saxe-Lauenburg (1586–1665) in return for his military services. Sometime later, Julius Henry made Ostrov his main representative residence. In 1625, in order to enhance its magnificence and displays his substantial wealth, he started transforming the Schlick castle into a stately home and laying out its garden. The author of the garden design is unknown.

In 1632, Julius Henry also acquired the nearby Zákupy castle through marrying Anna Magdalena of Lobkowicz, the widow of the Zákupy's prior owner. Julius Henry and his son Julius Francis (1641–1689) also reconstructed this castle into a baroque stately home, with an impressive garden as well.

In front of the original castle, Julius Henry added the so-called 'Lauenburg castle', a baroque wing. In the garden, he added the White Tower (Czech: Letohrádek), a baroque summerhouse. It was constructed between 1673 and 1679 basis a design of the Prague architect Abraham Leutner.

The dukes of Saxe-Lauenburg owned the Ostrov estate until 1689, when duke Julius Francis died in Zákupy. Ostrov was inherited by Sibylle Auguste (1675–1733), who married Louis William (1655–1707), Margrave of Baden-Baden. Zákupy was inherited by her sister Anna Maria Franziska (1672–1741), who was married to the last Medici Grand Duke of Tuscany, Gian Gastone (1671–1737).

=== House of Baden-Baden ===
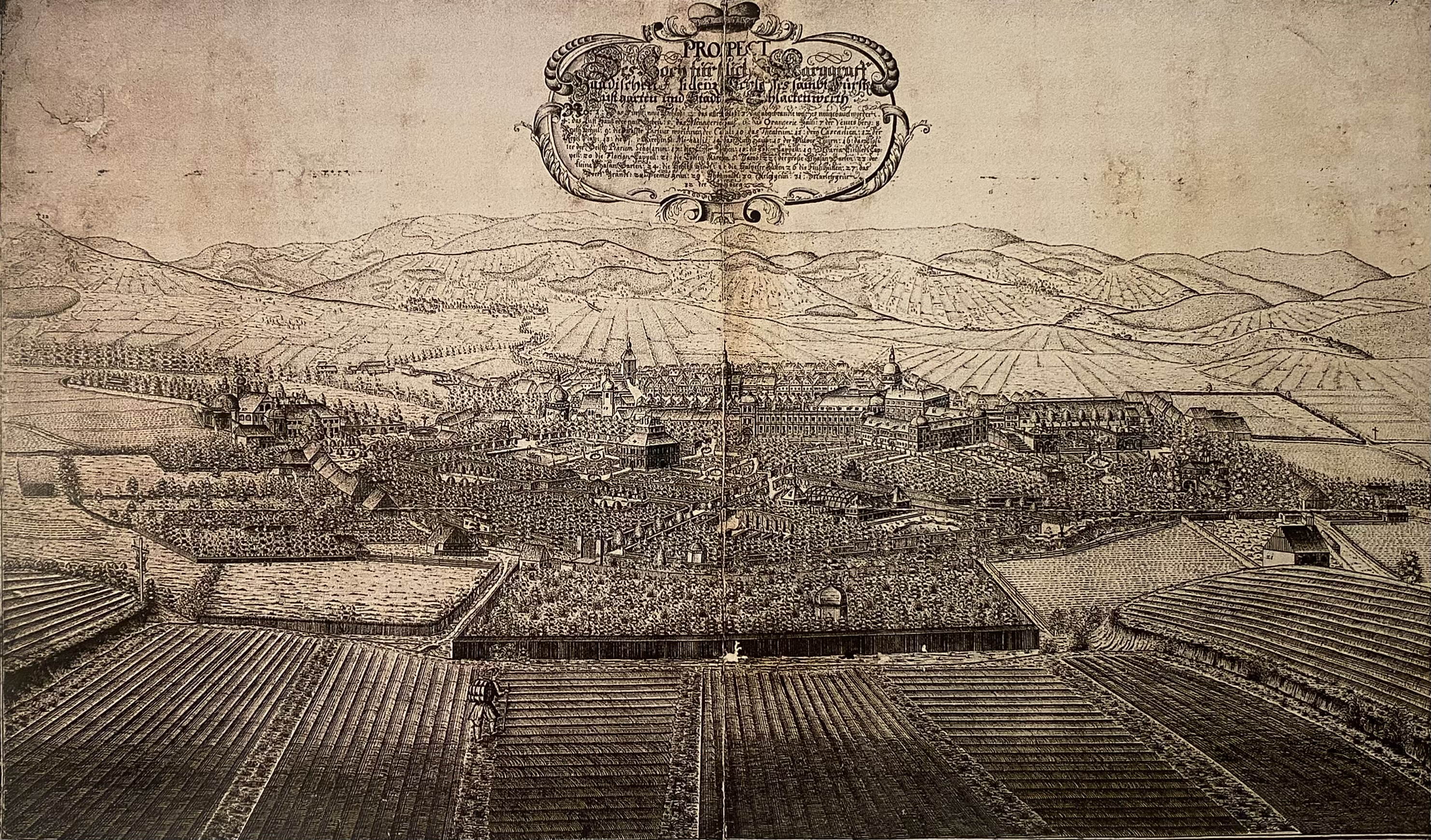
View of Ostrov Castle in its heyday in 1716

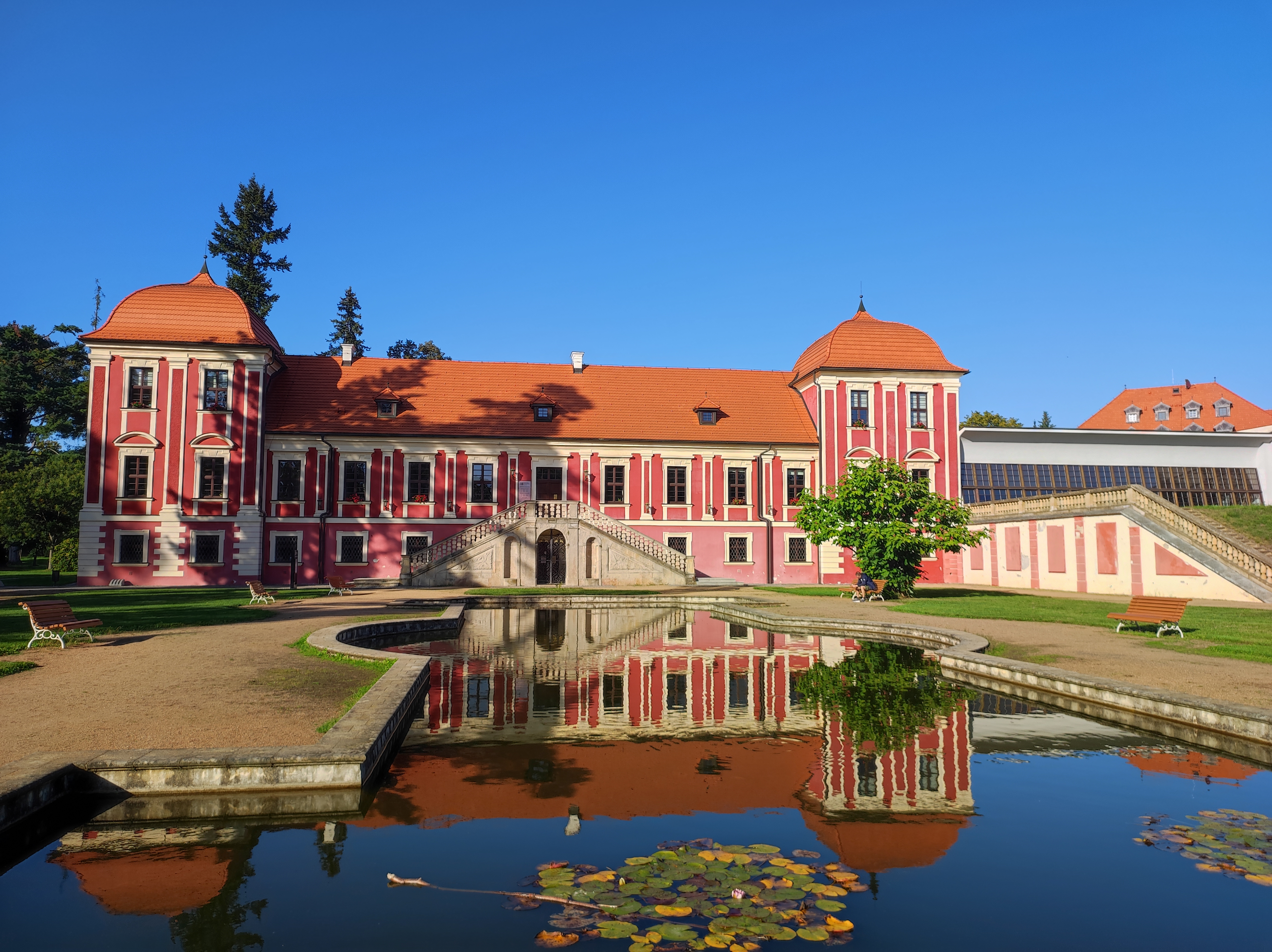
Palaces of the princes

Louis William was the ruling Margrave of Baden-Baden in Germany and chief commander of the Imperial Army. He was also known as Türkenlouis (English: Turkish Louis) for his numerous victories against Ottoman forces. As his residence in Baden-Baden, the 'Neues Schloss', was destroyed during the Nine Years' War (1688–1697), he lived together with Sibylle Auguste in Ostrov until 1699. Then the couple decided to construct Schloss Rastatt, a new palace in Rastatt, the new capital of Baden-Baden, and moved here. Ostrov going forward was a secondary residence, which was still repeatedly visited for longer stays.

The couple not only completed the construction of the Lauenburg block, but they also added a new wing, the so-called "palace of the princes." This three-wing building was constructed by the court architect Johan Sockh between 1693 and 1696. It is one storey high, and had one-storey higher square turrets, located at its corners. Other architects involved were Giulio Broggio, Christoph Dientenhofer, and Domenico Egidio Rossi (1679–1715). The latter became the designer of the Rastatt palace as well. Besides the castle, Louis William and Sibylle Auguste also further expanded the garden by adding the White Gate and the Sight Wall, which was decorated with statues, of which only has survived until today. The garden was considered one of the most famous gardens in Bohemia. In 1715, Johan Sockh made various engravings and drawings of the castle and gardens, depicting how it looked like in its heyday.

=== Crown property ===
When the last Margrave of Baden-Baden, Augustus George, died in 1771, it no longer belonged to the House of Baden. As from 1789, the Ostrov estate became crown property. A fire broke out on 14 September 1795, the castle was heavily damaged and only minimal repairs were carried out, such temporarily roofing. The western wing of the palace of the princes was demolished, including the communication corridor the castle itself. It took till 1804, before extensive repairs were performed in the castle. Another fire in 1866 also prompted modifications to the castle. As a result, the castle lost most of its 17th and 18th century interior.

=== House of Habsburg-Tuscany ===
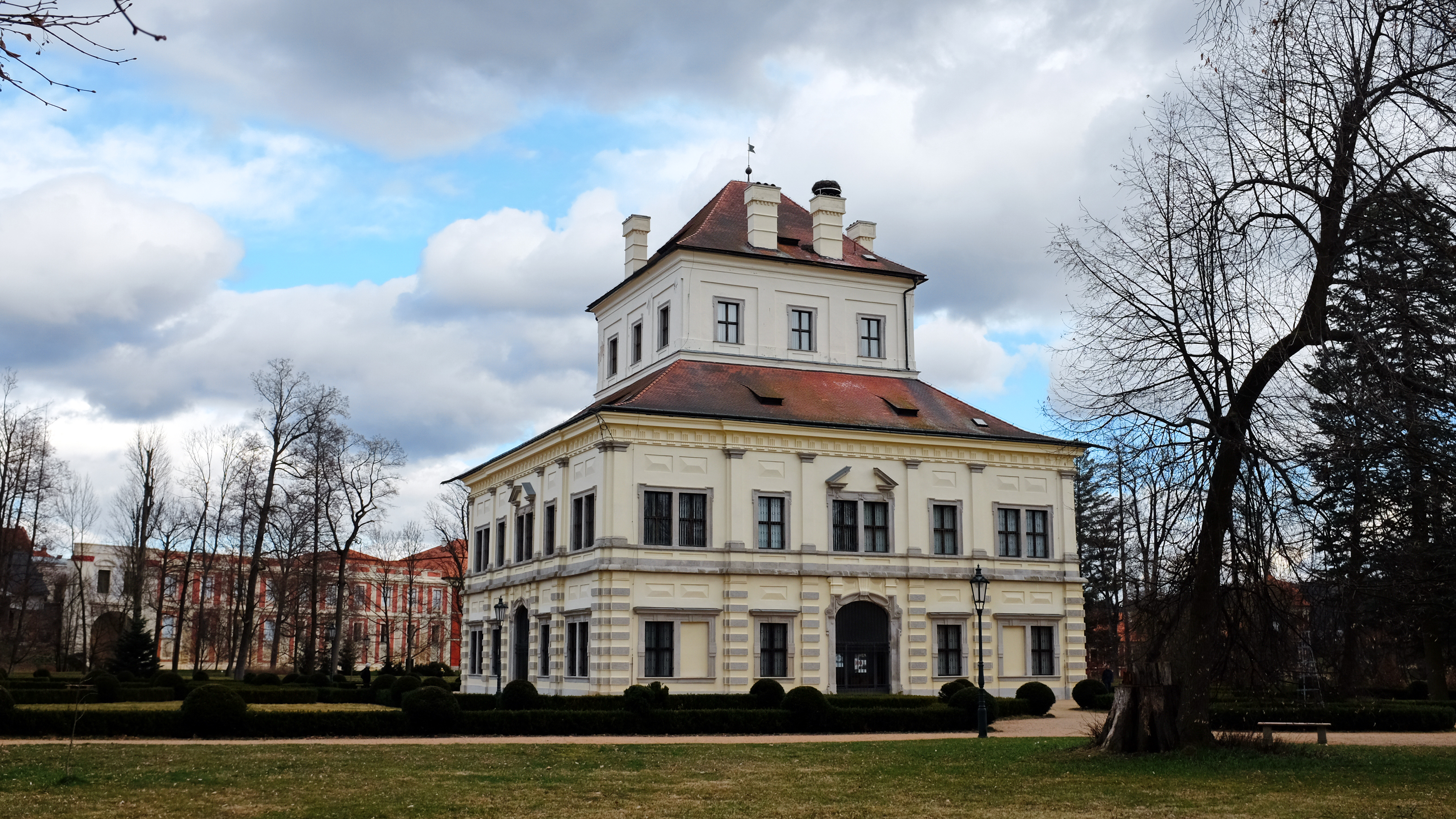
The White Tower

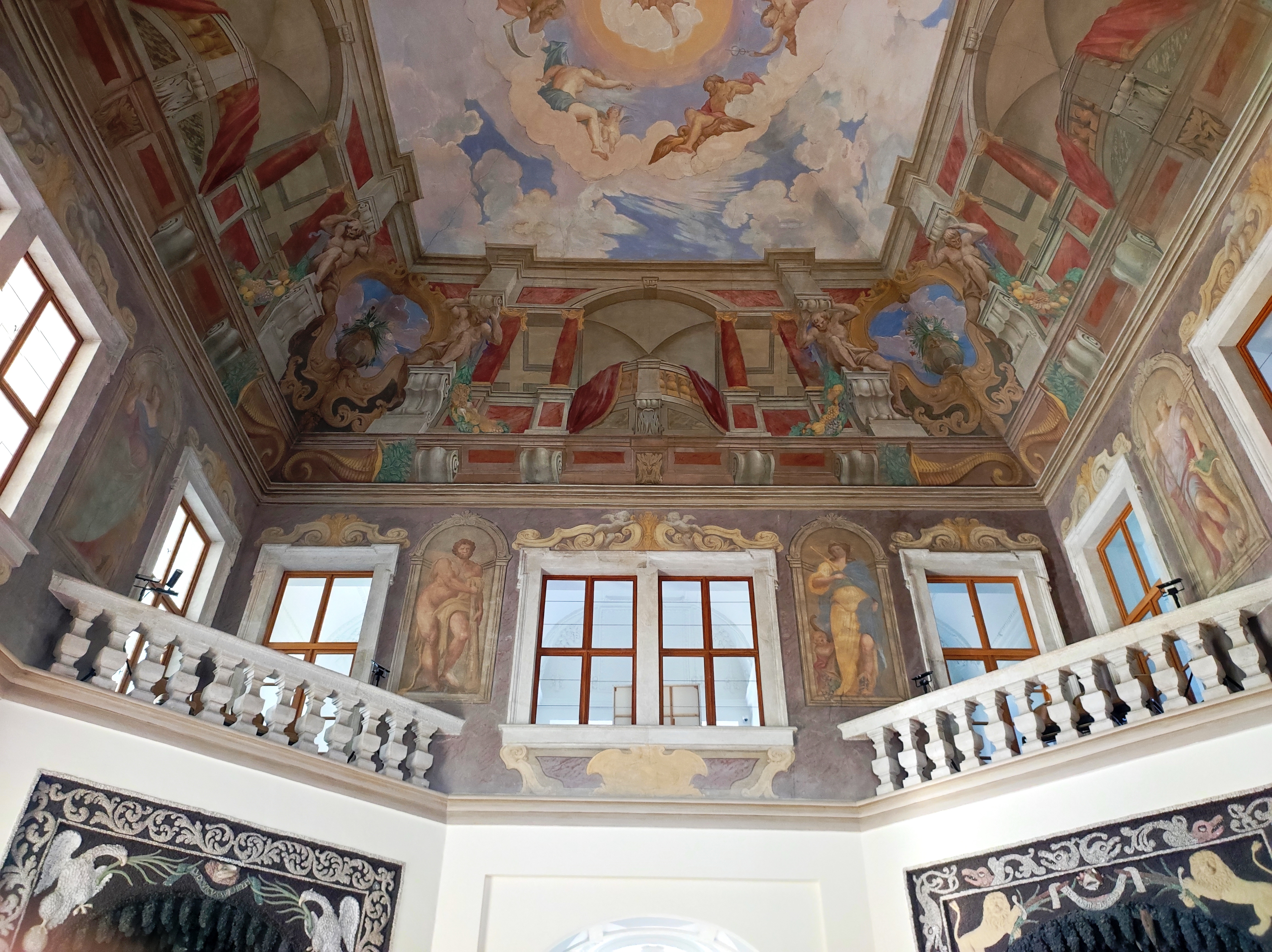
Interior of the White Tower

In 1811, Ferdinand III, Grand Duke of Tuscany (1769–1824) became owner of the Ostrov estate. However, he did not live at the castle. It was not until 1860, when the Grand Duchy of Tuscany was annexed and became part of the Kingdom of Italy, that Grand Duke Leopold II (1797–1870) came to live in Ostrov Castle. He became so involved, that the people of Ostrov asked him to become mayor of Ostrov, which he accepted. He reopened the museum, arranged for children of poor families to go school, and in 1866, when fire touched the Ostrov town, he used his private wealth to have the worst repaired.

During the time of the Tuscan Habsburgs, various alterations were made to renovate the castle and its park.

Leopold II was succeeded by his son, Grand Duke Ferdinand IV (1835–1908), who divided his time between Salzburg, Ostrov and his castle in Brandýs nad Labem. The last Habsburg owner was the son of Ferdinand IV, Archduke Joseph Ferdinand (1872–1942), but he did not live in Ostrov. Due to the aftermath of the First World War, he lost the castle and estates.

=== After 1918 till modern times ===
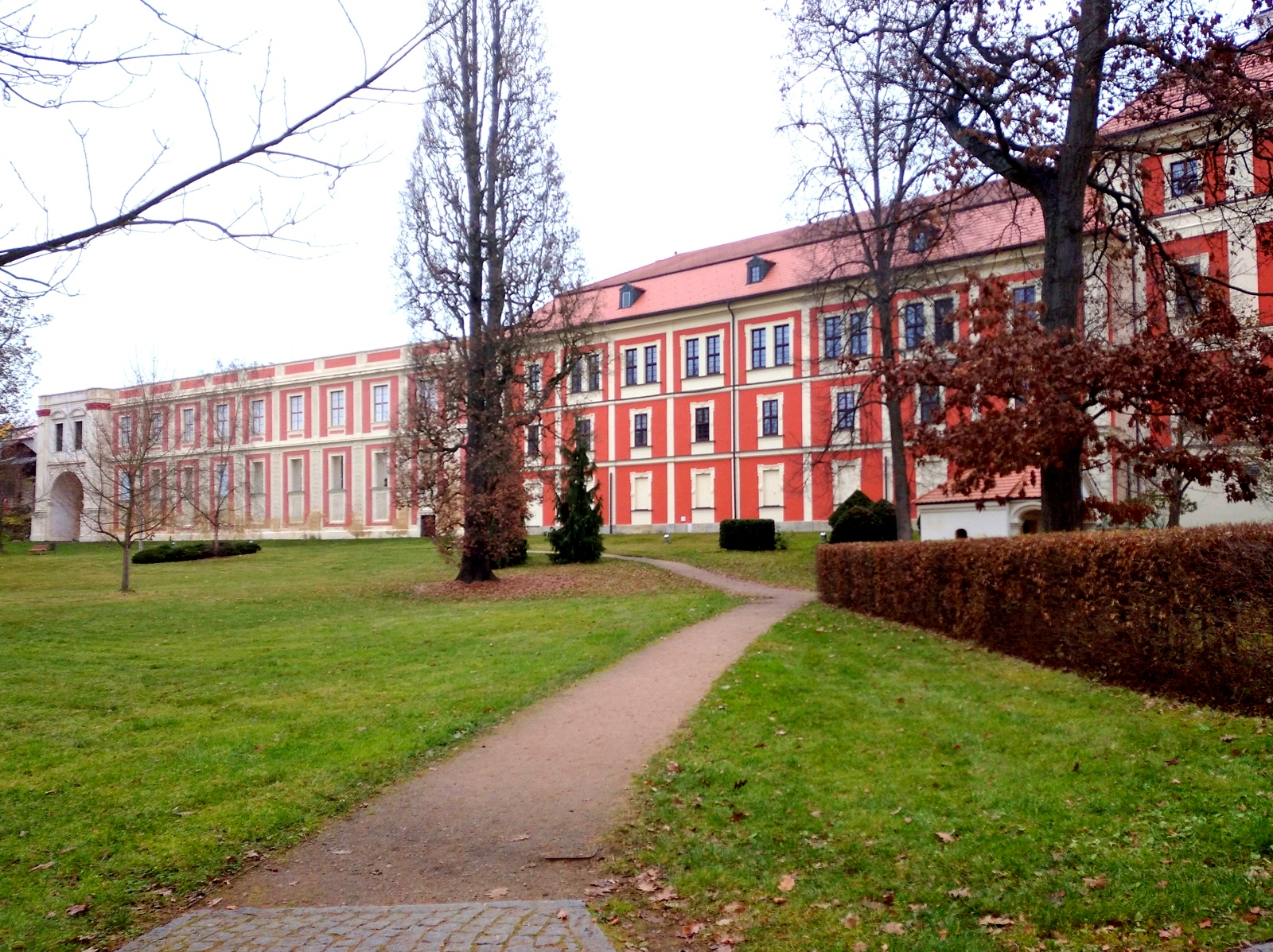
The Schlick wing

In 1918, after the downfall of the monarchy, the castle, together with other imperial and Habsburg property, was confiscated by the Czechoslovak state. Part of the furniture went to Lány Castle. The castle was used by various governmental bodies, and the palace of the princes fell into serious disrepair. On a certain moment, the ownership of the property was transferred to the Ostrov municipality. At the start of the 21st century, they started a large renovation with help of funds of the European Union.

Today, the main castle buildings (the Schlick wings and the Lauenburg castle) contain a museum and offices of the Ostrov municipality. The palace of the princes houses the library, while the White Tower is now the municipal gallery.

== Architecture ==
Ostrov Castle lies in the south of the town and the garden stretches to the south and west. At the core of the castle is the original Schlick castle. Connected to this nucleus, is the Lauenburg castle to the south, and this has become now the main entrance. During the renovations at the start of the 21st century, the courtyard of the Lauenburg castle has been covered with a glass roof. The palace of the princes, the wing added by the Baden-Baden margraves is more to south, but no longer connected anymore to the main complex due to the fire in 1795. Inside nothing remains anymore of the former splendour. Although during the renovation, the remains of 'Diana's bath' were found, a beautiful baroque pool which was constructed in 1696. It was located in the basement of the palace.

== Literature ==
- Sedláček, August (2000). "Ostrov zámek". Hrady, zámky a tvrze Království českého: Plzeňsko a Loketsko (in Czech). Prague: Jiří Čížek – ViGo agency. pp. 171–173.
- Vlček, Pavel (2001). Ilustrovaná encyklopedie českých zámků (in Czech). Prague: Nakladatelství Libri. pp. 403–405. ISBN 8072770284.
- Extra Schön Markgräfin Sibylla Augusta und Ihre Residenz – Eine Ausstellung anlässlich des 275. Todestages der Markgräfin Sibylla Augusta von Baden-Baden (in German). Petersberg: Michael Imhof Verlag. 2008. p. 216. ISBN 978-3-86568-374-8.
- Gregorovičová, Eva; Kobesová, Miluše; Kubů, Naděžda; Sršeň, Lubomír; Kahuda, Jan (2016). Toskánští Habsburkové a ostrovské panství 1808-1918 = Die Herrschaft Schlackenwerth zur Zeit der Großherzöge von Toskana (in Czech). Ostrov: Město Ostrov. p. 37. ISBN 978-8026097648.
