= Zapad =

Zapad may refer to:

- Zapad exercise, several Soviet and Russian military exercises
- Západ, 1896 Czech novel
- Zapad (Minsk) microdistrict of Minsk
- Zapad-4 neighborhood of Minsk
- Košice-Západ, district of Košice, Slovakia
- Russian special battalion "Zapad"
