= Kameničky =

- Municipality
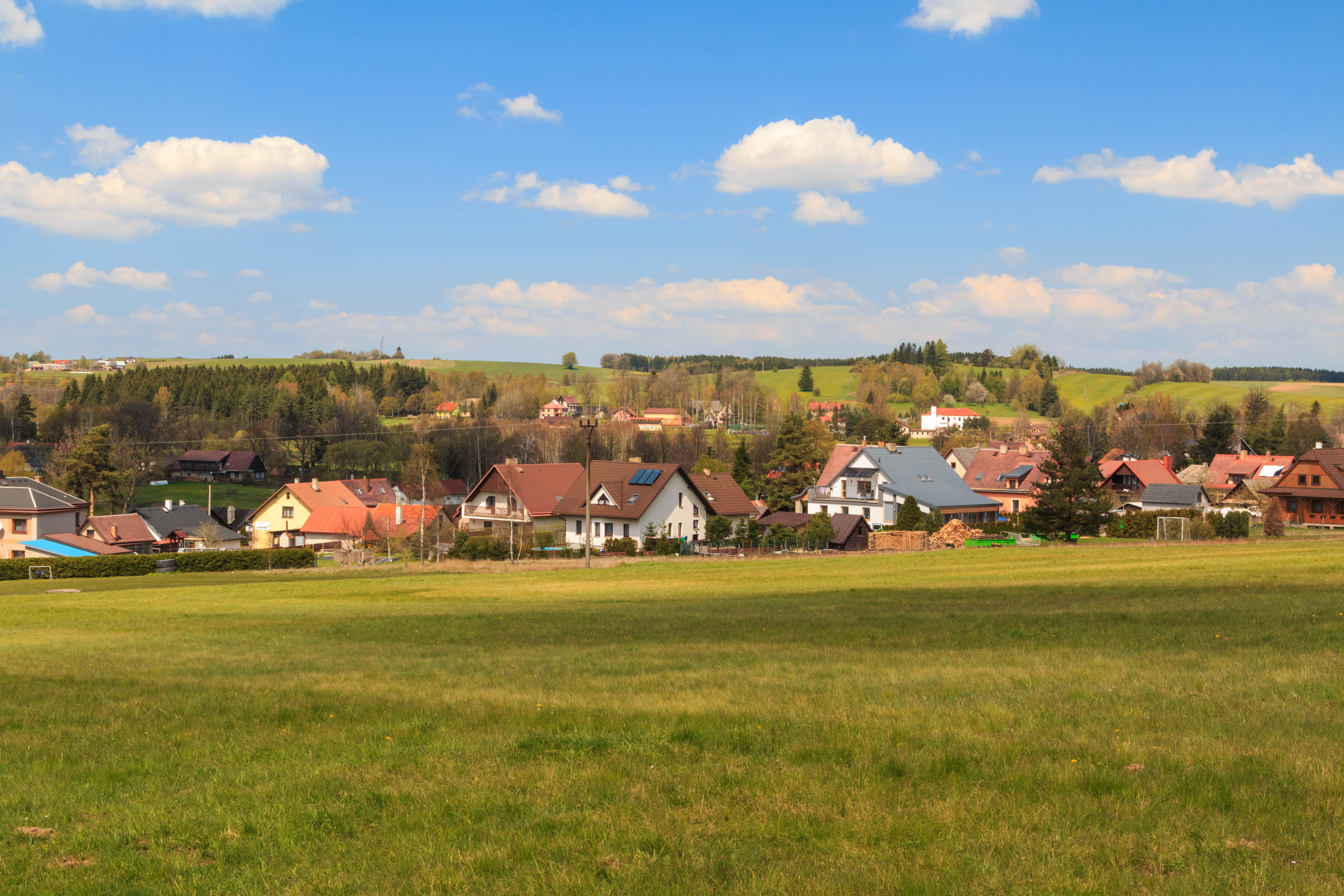
- General view

- Flag Coat of arms

- Location in the Czech Republic
- Coordinates: 49°44′9″N 15°58′30″E
- Country: Czech Republic
- Region: Pardubice
- District: Chrudim
- First mentioned: 1350

Area
  - Total: 7.83 km^{2} (3.02 sq mi)
- Elevation: 625 m (2,051 ft)

Population (2026-01-01)
  - Total: 780
  - Density: 100/km^{2} (260/sq mi)
- Time zone: UTC+1 (CET)
  - Summer (DST): UTC+2 (CEST)
- Postal codes: 539 01, 539 41
- Website: www.obec-kamenicky.cz

Kameničky is a municipality and village in Chrudim District in the Pardubice Region of the Czech Republic. It has about 800 inhabitants.

== Administrative division ==
Kameničky consists of two municipal parts (in brackets population according to the 2021 census):

- Kameničky (662)
- Filipov (106)

== Etymology ==
The initial name of the Kameničky was Kamenice. It is a former name of the Chrudimka River, which was transferred to the village. To distinguish it from places with the same name, especially from the nearby market town of Trhová Kamenice (formerly just Kamenice), it was renamed Kamenička (a diminutive of Kamenice). In the 15th–17th centuries, the village was called Rajchlova/Rejchlova Kamenice ("Rajchl's/Rejchl's Kamenice"). Since the 17th century, the name Kameničky (the plural of Kamenička) has been used.

== Geography ==
Kameničky is located about 26 kilometres (16 mi) southeast of Chrudim and 35 km (22 mi) southeast of Pardubice. It lies in the Iron Mountains, in the Žďárské vrchy Protected Landscape Area. The municipality is situated on the Chrudimka River, near its spring.

== History ==
The first written mention of Kameničky is from 1350, when a parish church is documented here. The village of Filipov was founded in the late 18th century.

== Demographics ==
Historical population

Year	Pop.	±%
1869	1,176	—
1880	1,125	−4.3%
1890	1,157	+2.8%
1900	1,185	+2.4%
1910	1,097	−7.4%

Year	Pop.	±%
1921	1,012	−7.7%
1930	1,155	+14.1%
1950	838	−27.4%
1961	883	+5.4%
1970	834	−5.5%

Year	Pop.	±%
1980	788	−5.5%
1991	776	−1.5%
2001	768	−1.0%
2011	798	+3.9%
2021	768	−3.8%

Source: Censuses

== Transport ==
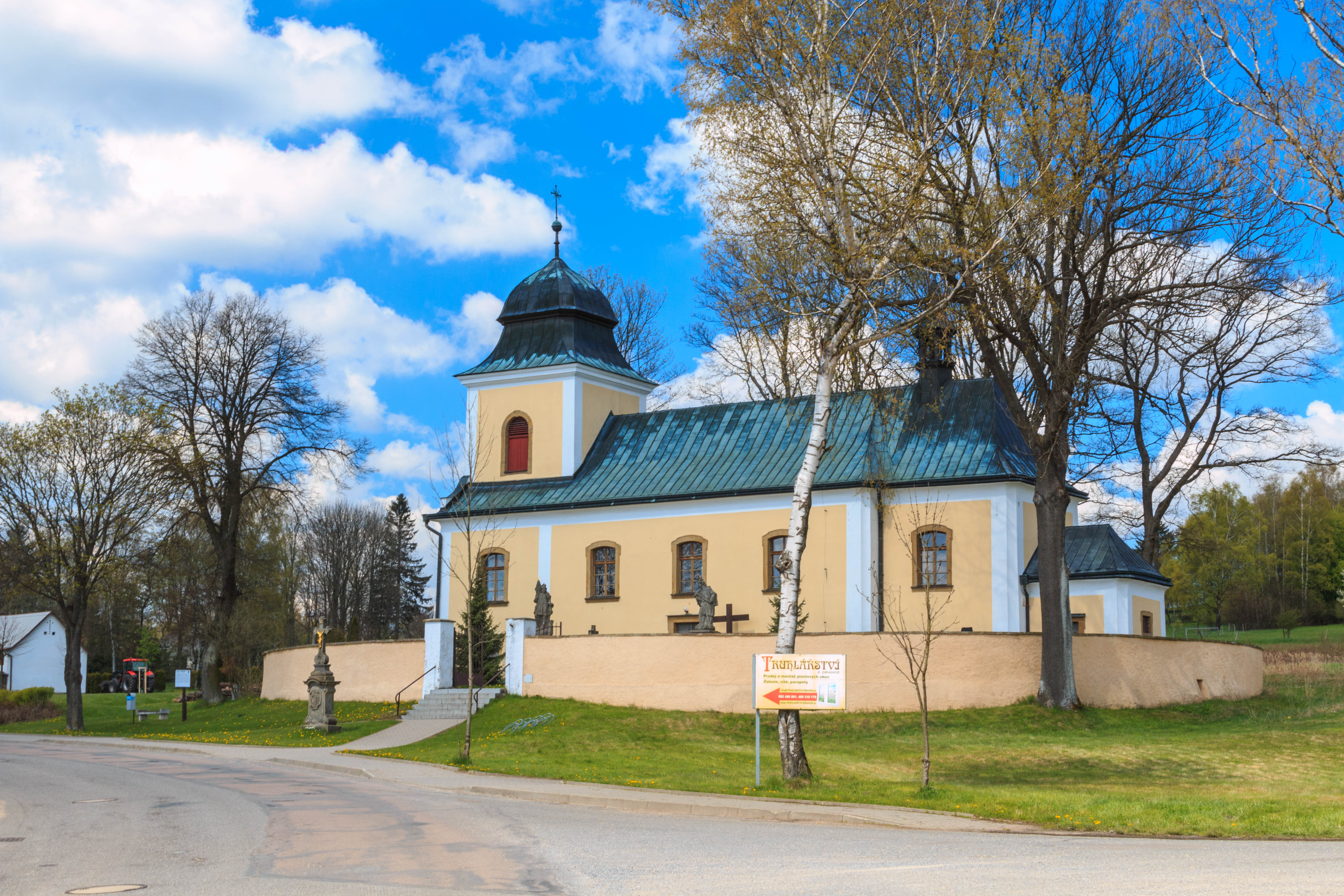
Church of the Holy Trinity

There are no railways or major roads passing through the municipality.

== Sights ==
The main landmark of Kameničky is the Church of the Holy Trinity. It was built in the Baroque style in 1764–1766, when it replaced an old wooden church. The complex around the church contains a monument to World War I victims and valuable statues of St. John of Nepomuk from 1723 and St. Florian from 1779.

== In art ==
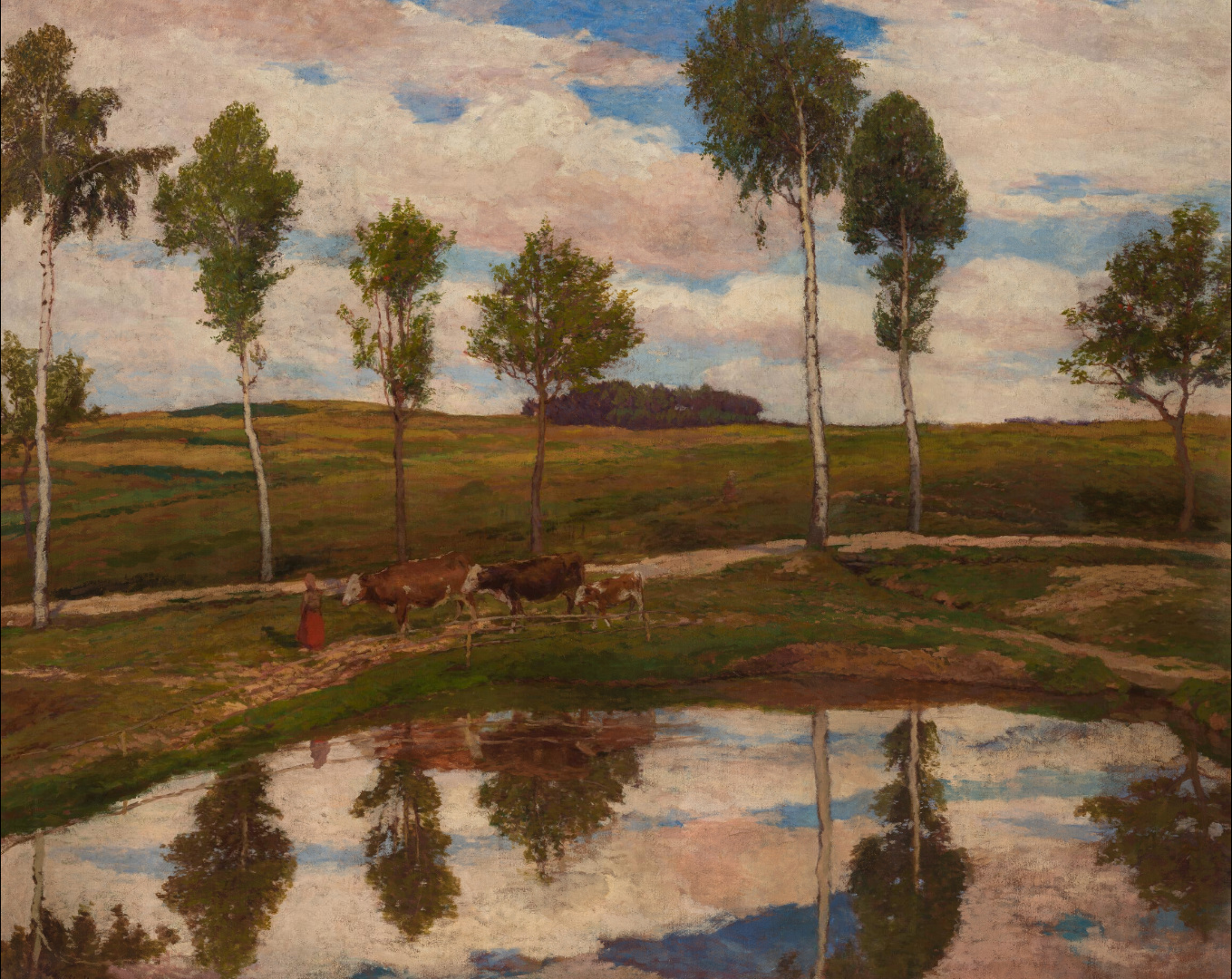
The painting At Home in Kameničky by Antonín Slavíček

In the early 20th century, after Karel Václav Rais published the book Západ about this area, painter Antonín Slavíček often visited Kameničky and lived here for three years. He created about 70 paintings here, including one of his most famous works At Home in Kameničky. Many other artists visited him in the village. Today, the municipality periodically operates art exhibitions and maintains a Slavíček art gallery.
