= Lázně Bělohrad =

- Town
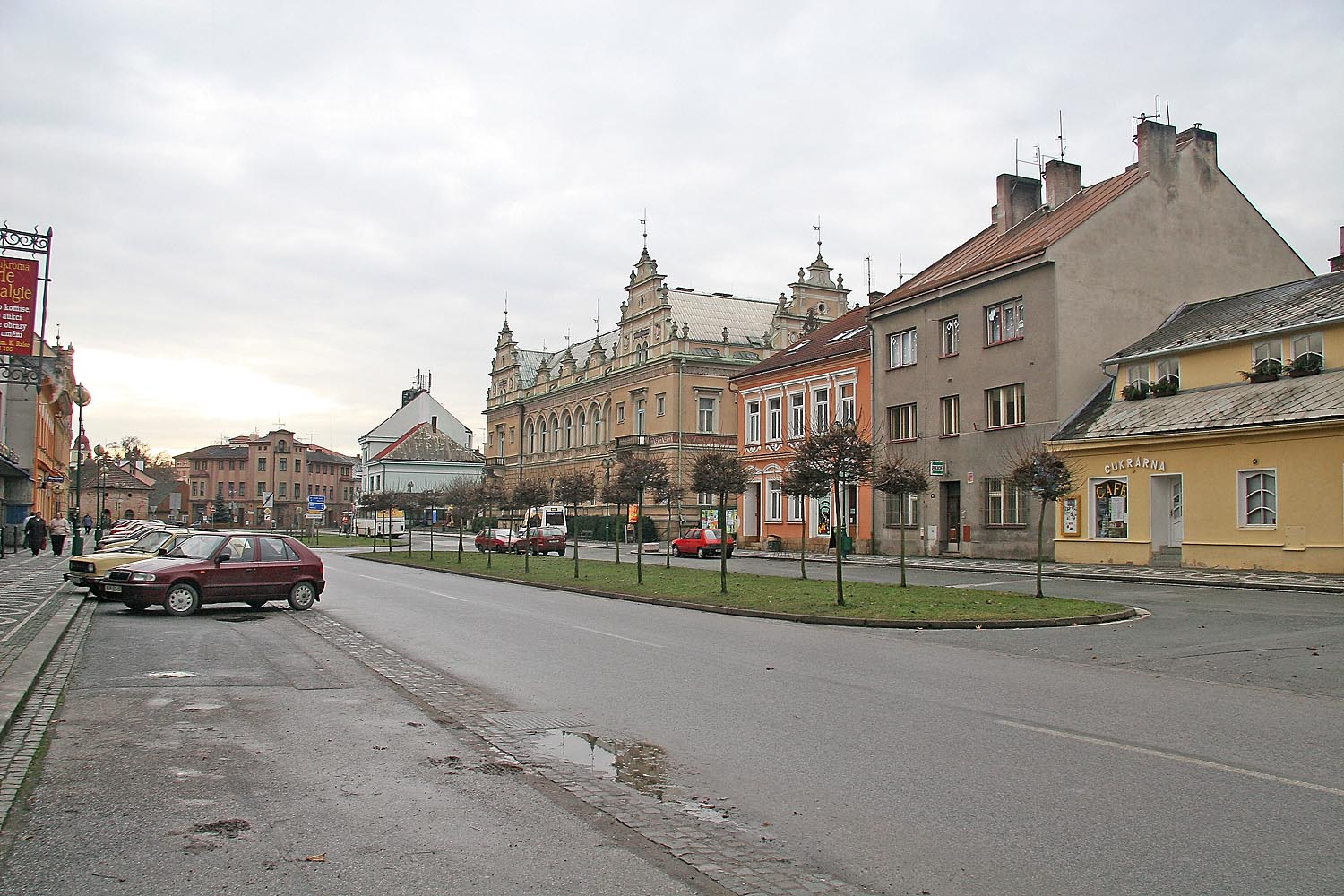
- Town square

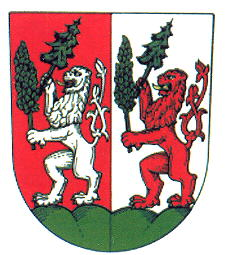
- Flag Coat of arms

- Location in the Czech Republic
- Coordinates: 50°26′51″N 15°35′52″E
- Country: Czech Republic
- Region: Hradec Králové
- District: Jičín
- First mentioned: 1557

Government
  - Mayor: Alena Kuželová

Area
  - Total: 28.39 km^{2} (10.96 sq mi)
- Elevation: 291 m (955 ft)

Population (2026-01-01)
  - Total: 3,701
  - Density: 130.4/km^{2} (337.6/sq mi)
- Time zone: UTC+1 (CET)
  - Summer (DST): UTC+2 (CEST)
- Postal code: 507 81
- Website: mestolaznebelohrad.cz

Lázně Bělohrad (Czech pronunciation: [ˈlaːzɲɛ ˈbjɛloɦrat]) is a spa town in Jičín District in the Hradec Králové Region of the Czech Republic. It has about 3,700 inhabitants. The town is located on the Javorka River, on the border between the Jičín Uplands and Giant Mountains Foothills.

Lázně Bělohrad was founded in the 16th century and the local spa was founded in 1880. The main landmark of the town is the Bělohrad Castle.

== Administrative division ==
Lázně Bělohrad consists of nine municipal parts (in brackets population according to the 2021 census):

- Lázně Bělohrad (1,924)
- Brtev (137)
- Dolní Javoří (19)
- Dolní Nová Ves (301)
- Horní Nová Ves (580)
- Hřídelec (97)
- Lány (174)
- Prostřední Nová Ves (317)
- Uhlíře (32)

== Etymology ==
The new local fortress and later the settlement was allegedly named after the white walls of the fortress (derived from Bílý hrad, i.e. 'white castle'). There is also a theory that it was named after the Serbian city of Belgrade (Czech: Bělehrad). The name was originally written as Bělehrad and the form Bělohrad appeared only in 1603. In the 1890s, the town was renamed Lázně Bělohrad ('spa Bělohrad').

== Geography ==
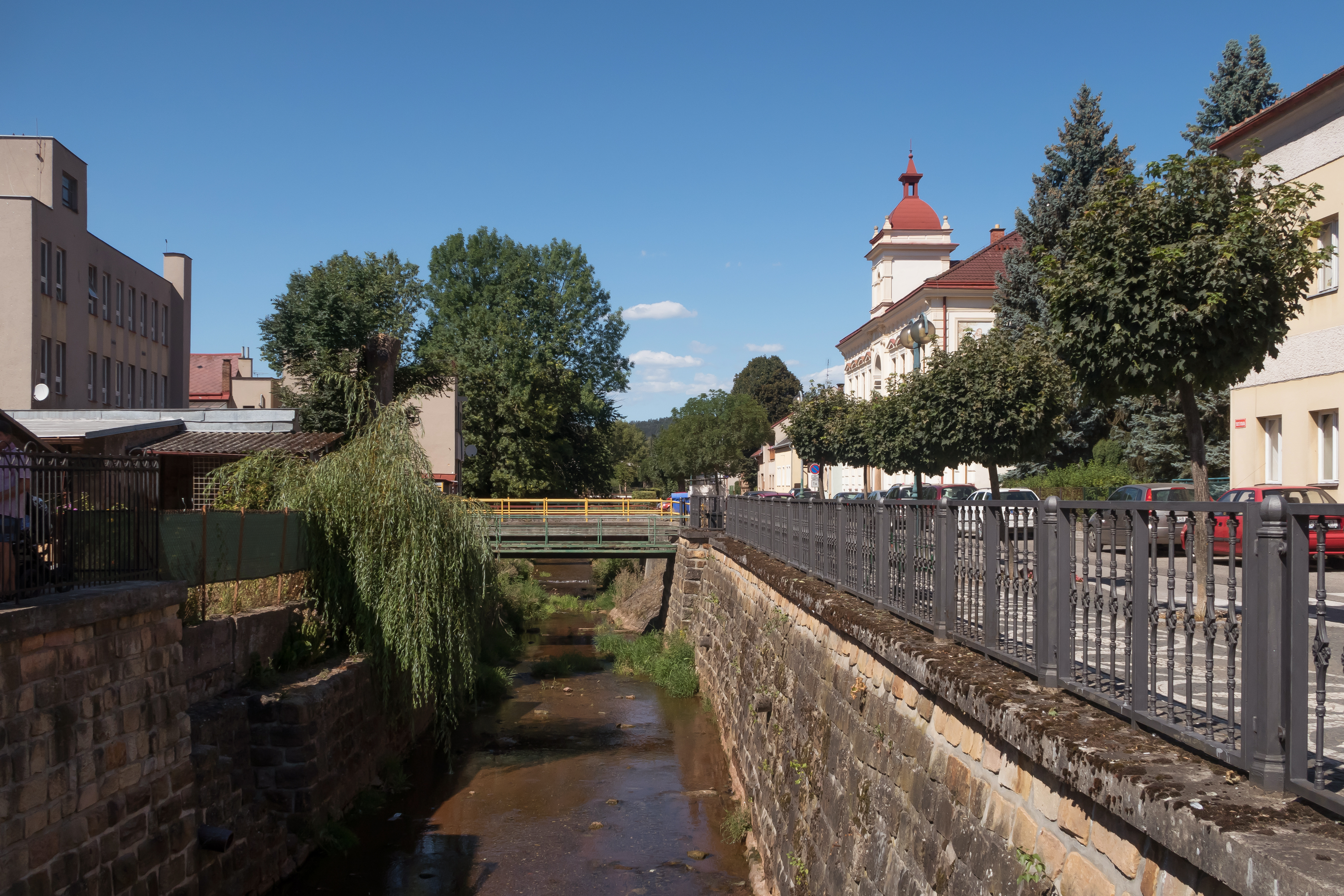
The Javorka River in the town

Lázně Bělohrad is located about 16 kilometres (10 mi) east of Jičín and 29 km (18 mi) northwest of Hradec Králové. It lies mostly in the Jičín Uplands. The northern part of the municipal territory belongs to the Giant Mountains Foothills and includes the highest point of Lázně Bělohrad, the hill Čihadlo at 516 m (1,693 ft) above sea level. The Javorka River flows through the town. There are several small fishponds around the town.

== History ==
The today's town was created from the settlement Nová Ves, first mentioned in 1354. In the 16th century, a new fortress was established nearby. The first written mention of Bělohrad is from 1557. In 1626–1643, it was owned by Albrecht von Wallenstein. During the rule of Guillaume de Lamboy, the village was settled by German colonists. From 1669, it was again acquired by the Waldstein family. In 1722, it was promoted to a market town by Charles VI, and Nová Ves became a part of Bělohrad.

In 1871, the railway was built and Bělohrad developed rapidly. In 1880, the spa was founded, and in 1885, first spa buildings were built.

== Demographics ==
Historical population

Year	Pop.	±%
1869	4,262	—
1880	4,370	+2.5%
1890	4,481	+2.5%
1900	4,877	+8.8%
1910	5,269	+8.0%

Year	Pop.	±%
1921	4,676	−11.3%
1930	4,734	+1.2%
1950	3,861	−18.4%
1961	4,013	+3.9%
1970	3,858	−3.9%

Year	Pop.	±%
1980	3,974	+3.0%
1991	3,823	−3.8%
2001	3,796	−0.7%
2011	3,688	−2.8%
2021	3,581	−2.9%

Source: Censuses

== Economy ==
Lázně Bělohrad is known for its sulfur peat spa, which is among the largest employers in the town. The spa focuses on the treatment of musculoskeletal disorders, gynecological, neurological and skin diseases.

== Transport ==
Lázně Bělohrad is located on the railway line Kolín–Trutnov.

== Sights ==
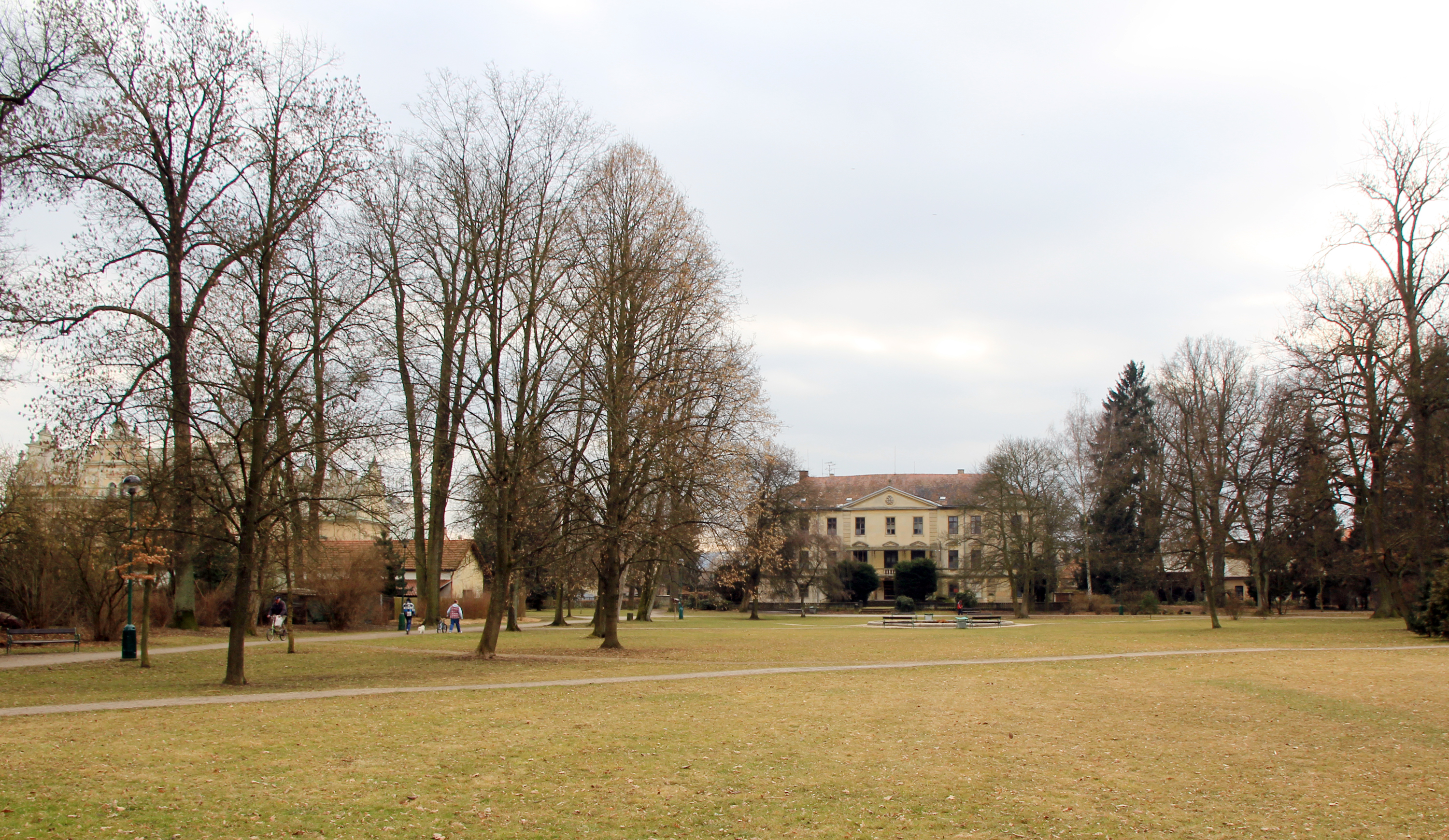
Bělohrad Castle and the park

The Bělohrad Castle was a Renaissance castle built around 1550. It was rebuilt around 1721, probably by Jan Santini Aichel. The castle is surrounded by a freely accessible castle park. In the park is located Memorial to Karel Václav Rais, who is the most notable native. The memorial is located in the Empire style building of the former orangery, which dates from 1831. In the memorial is a museum with an exhibition about the life and work of Rais, and about the history of the town.

The Church of All Saints was first documented in 1354. In 1689–1700, it was replaced by the current early Baroque building.

== Notable people ==
- Karel Václav Rais (1859–1926), novelist

== Twin towns – sister cities ==
Lázně Bělohrad is twinned with:

- Belene, Bulgaria
