= August Švagrovský =

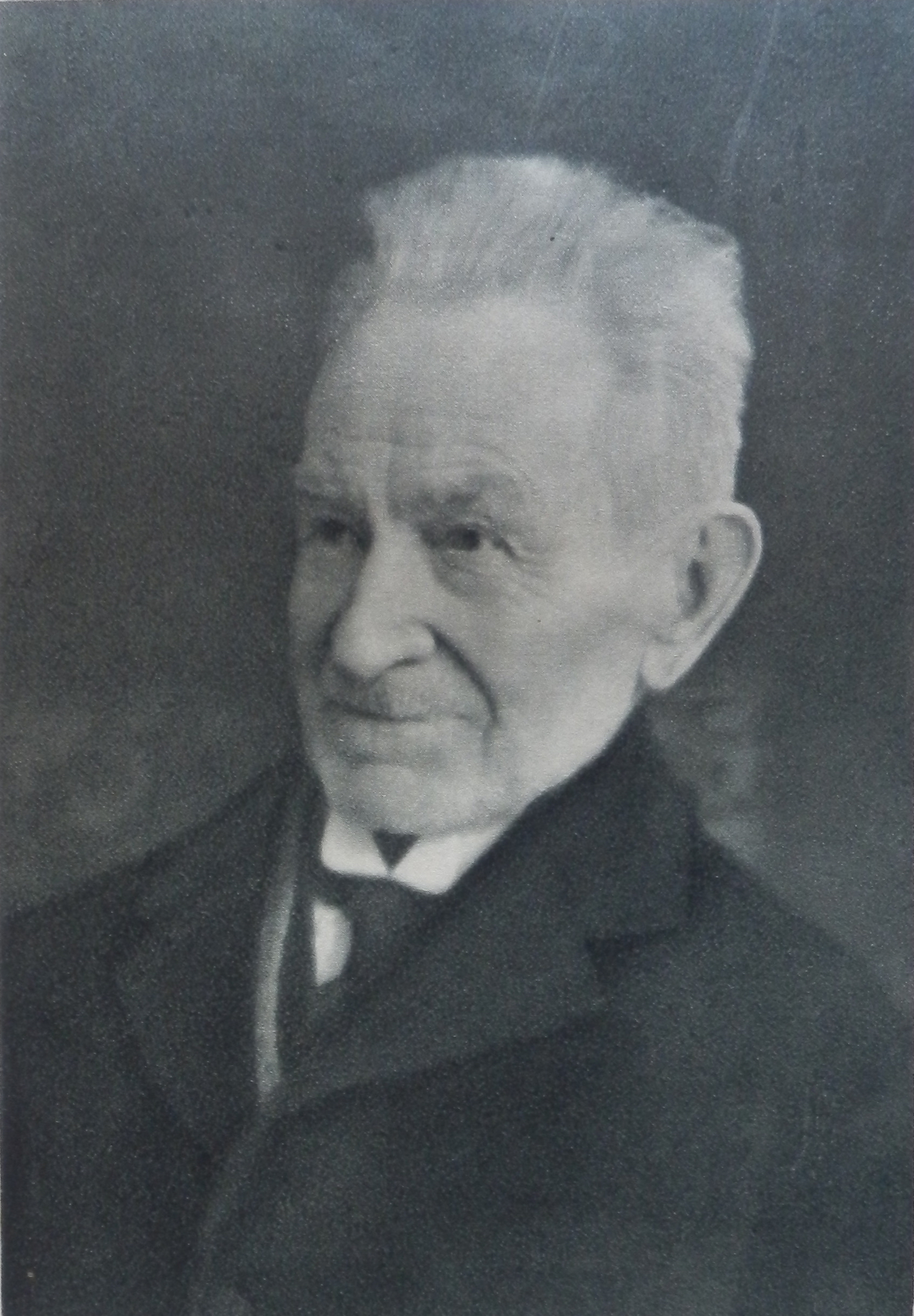
August Švagrovský (1931)

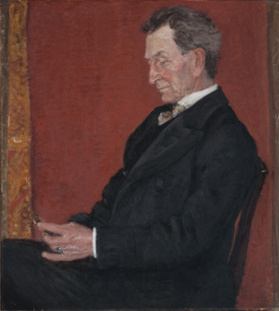
Portrait by Miloš Jiránek (1907)

August Švagrovský, also Augustin or Gustav (14 March 1847, Roudnice nad Labem - 27 June 1931, Písek) was a Czech art patron and collector.

== Biography ==
His father was a Master butcher, but became rich by opening a steam sawmill and transporting wood along the Elbe to Germany. He attended the Business Academy in Prague and, after his father's death in 1866, joined with his brothers to operate the sawmill. Due to the after effects of the financial panic and his tendency toward generous philanthropy, the business did not do well.

In 1868, he began to be active in liberal political causes and provided wood for the construction of the National Theater, at cost. Many small, liberal journals owed their existence to his donations. He was also a major supporter of the local library. He welcomed numerous celebrities as guests to the family estate in Bechlín; including Jan Neruda and Bedřich Smetana. In 1872, Neruda invited him to a meeting that found the writer, Karel Sabina, guilty of being a police informant. The role he played in the meeting is not clear, although he later said that he was not informed of its purpose in advance.

In 1880, he sold his share of the company to his younger brother, Max. In 1882, he was re-registered as the owner, but chose to leave Roudnice, possibly as the result of a political dispute (he supported the Young Czech Party), and seek other employment. Unable to do so in Bohemia, he spent several years in other countries; mostly France.

As a result of his stay there, he became interested in art and, upon his return, decided to provide assistance to young Czech painters. He lived quite frugally; donating most of his resources to them. At first, he worked as a government clerk, then as a manager for the Kratochvíl company, a supplier of hops.

One of his favorite artists was Antonín Slavíček, whom he met and befriended in 1903. Miloš Jiránek also received support that was crucial to his career. Their paintings formed the basis of a collection that was later donated to Roudnice.

As early as 1904, he laid the foundations for what would become the Modern Art Gallery of Roudnice, by donating nine paintings to the city. In 1910, he donated 225 more. In addition to his favored artists, his donations came to include works by Zdenka Braunerová, Antonín Chittussi, Adolf Liebscher, Max Švabinský and Josef Mánes.

He died, single and childless, during a summer vacation. A street in Roudnice has been named after him.
