= Jan Slavíček =

Czech painter (1900–1970)

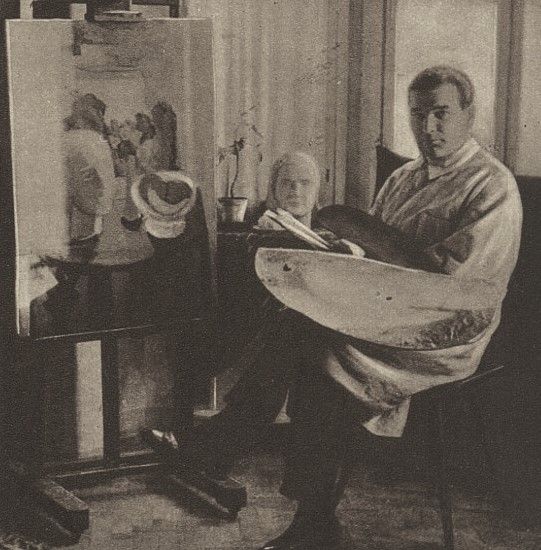
- Jan Slavíček in 1933
- Born: 22 January 1900; Prague, Bohemia, Austria-Hungary
- Died: 5 April 1970 (aged 70); Prague, Czechoslovakia
- Burial place: Olšany Cemetery

Jan Slavíček (22 January 1900 – 5 April 1970) was a Czech painter. He was son of painter Antonín Slavíček (1870–1910) and brother of director and editor Jiří Slavíček.

== Life ==
He studied at the Academy of Fine Arts, Prague under Jan Preisler, Vratislav Nehleba, Max Švabinský and Otakar Nejedlý (1916–1925).

He was a member of SVU Mánes starting in 1922 and has undertaken a number of study trips to France (including Corsica), Italy, Spain, England, Greece, the Soviet Union and Yugoslavia.

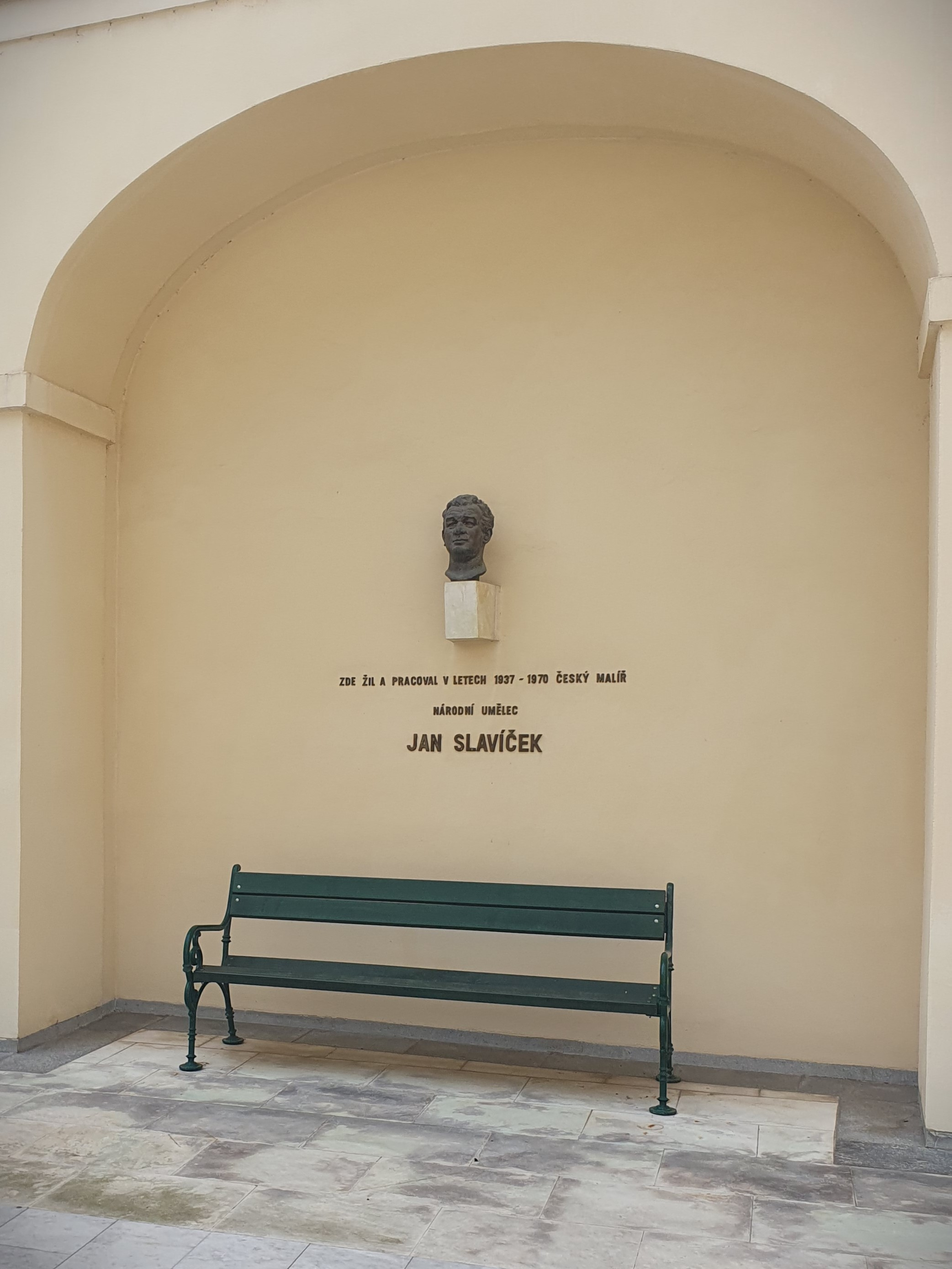
Bust in Hrzánský Palace

From 1937 to 1970, he lived in the rear wing of the Hrzánský Palace in Prague-Hradčany, painting the views of Prague from his studio window.

== Awards ==
- 1953 Klement Gottwald State Prize laureate
- 1967 National Artist

Slavíček had been known for his still life and landscape painting including many painting of views in Prague. He dealt with the impulses of French fauvism in his early years, but soon found his own painting expression, based on sensual realism. Many landscapes use the Orlické Mountains.
