= Antonín Slavíček =

Czech natural painter (1870–1910)

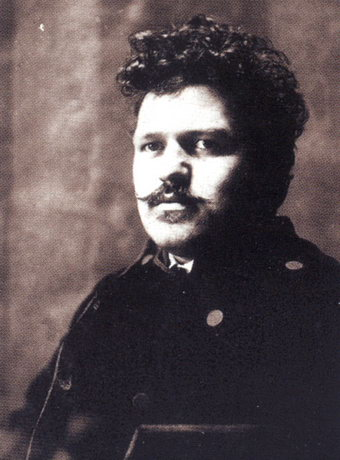
- Antonín Slavíček (1898)
- Born: 16 May 1870; Prague-Old Town, Bohemia, Austria-Hungary
- Died: 1 February 1910 (aged 39); Holešovice, Bohemia, Austria-Hungary
- Resting place: Olšany Cemetery

Antonín Slavíček (16 May 1870 – 1 February 1910) was a Czech Impressionist painter. He worked mostly in the area surrounding Kameničky.

== Life ==
In 1887, he entered the Academy of Fine Arts, Prague, where he studied landscape painting with Julius Mařák. His studies were interrupted on several occasions, apparently due to disagreements with Mařák. In October 1899, Professor Mařák died and Slavíček applied to replace him, but was not accepted. The landscape painting speciality was discontinued.

An important friend of his was the art collector August Švagrovský. A large number of his paintings passed from Švagrovský's collection to the museum in Roudnice.

His wife fell seriously ill in 1908, making it necessary to travel to Dubrovnik for treatment, and he broke his arm during their stay there. After it had healed, in August 1909, they took a vacation to the Orlické Mountains and, while he was swimming in the Zdobnice, he had a stroke that paralyzed his right side. A long period of recovery followed. He made several attempts to paint with his left hand, but the results were disappointing. Soon after, he shot himself while "in a state of insanity", according to the death certificate. His widow, Bohumila, married a family friend, the painter Herbert Masaryk; son of Tomáš Masaryk.

His son Jan also became a painter, and his son Jiří was a well-known screenwriter and director.

== Selected paintings ==
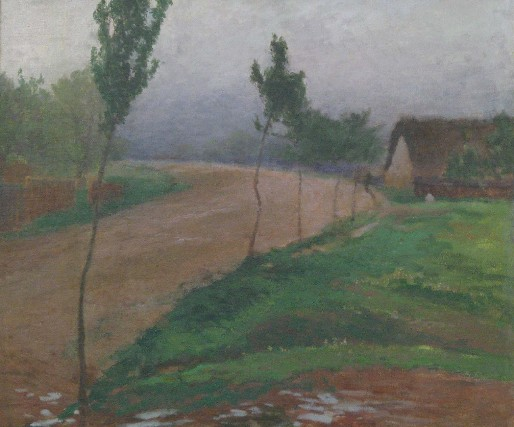
The Road in the Rain
(date unknown)

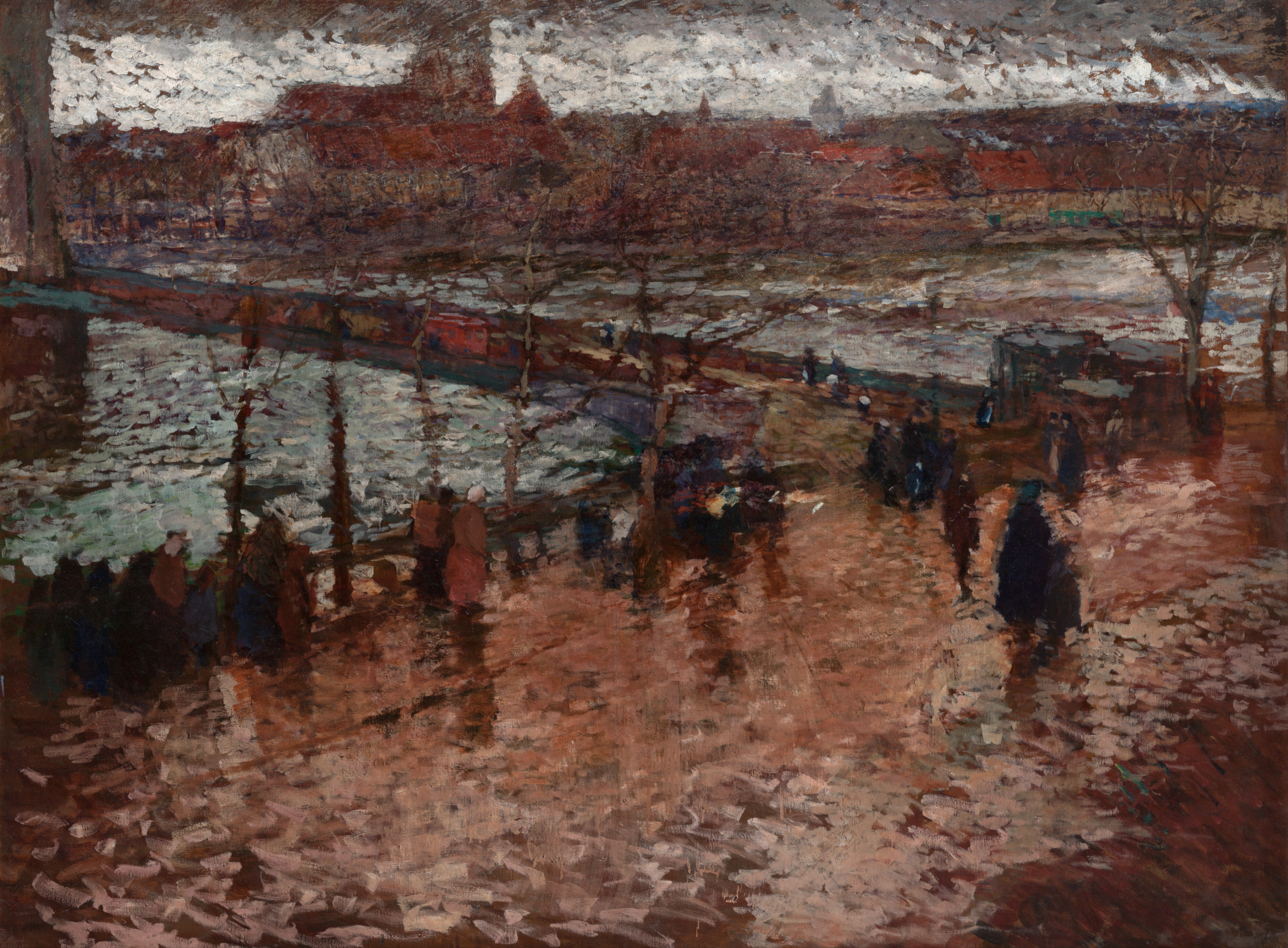
Elizabeth Bridge (1906)

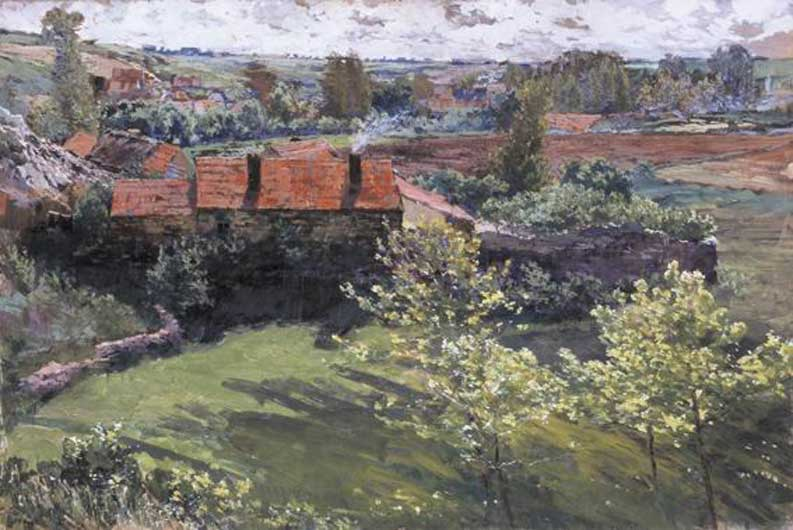
A Day in June (1898)

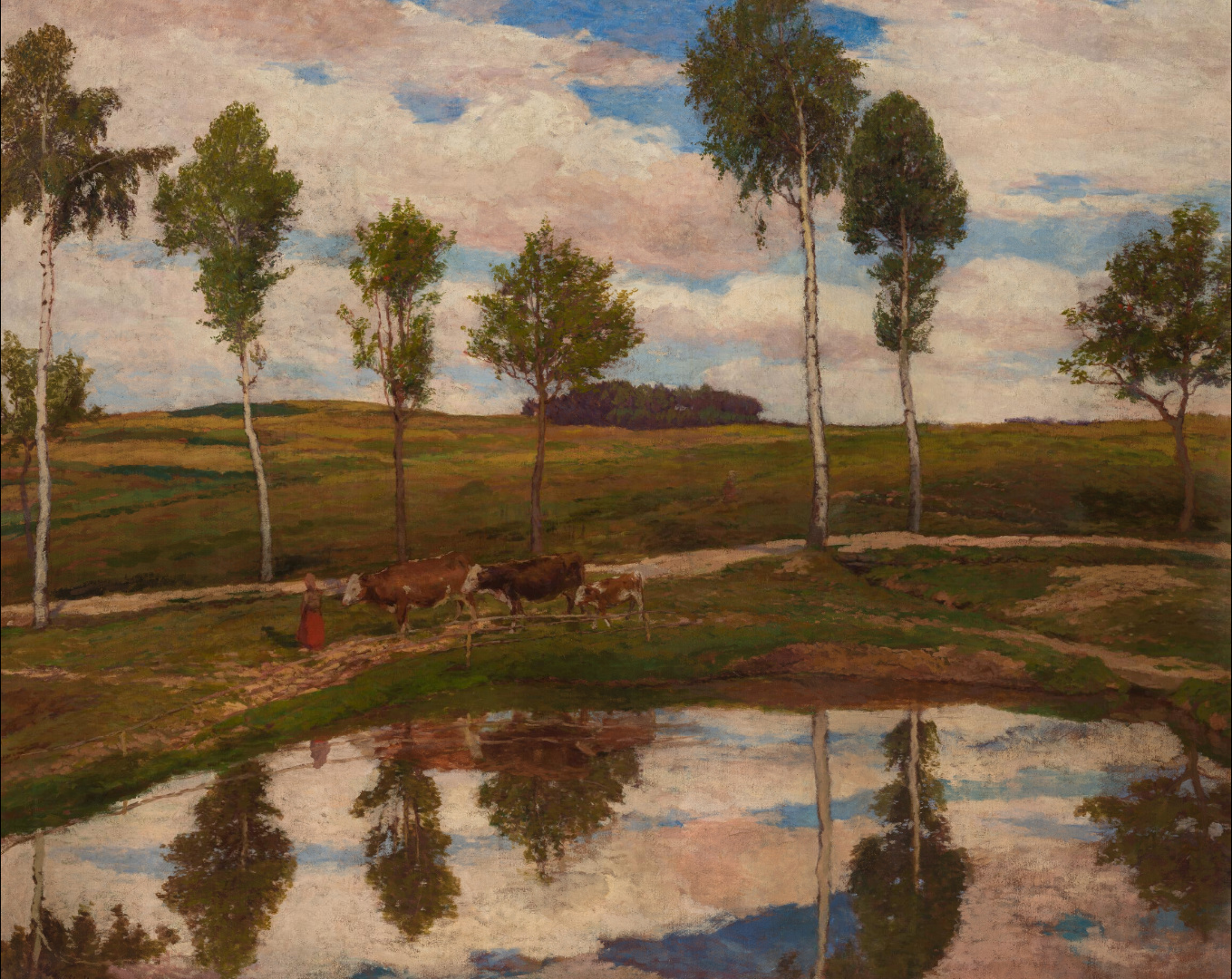
At Home in Kameničky (1904)
