= Lužec nad Vltavou =

- Municipality
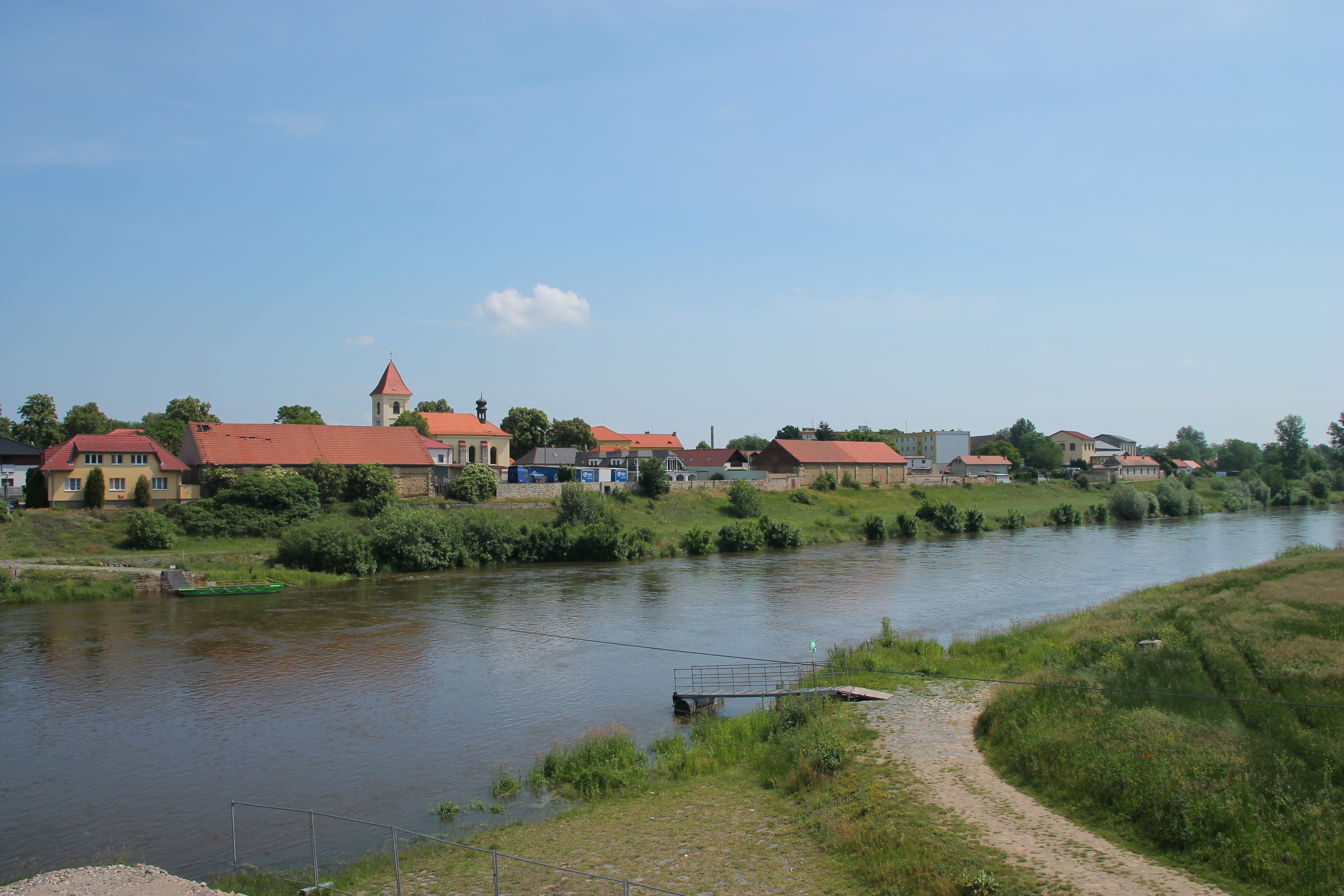
- View from the southwest over the Vltava River

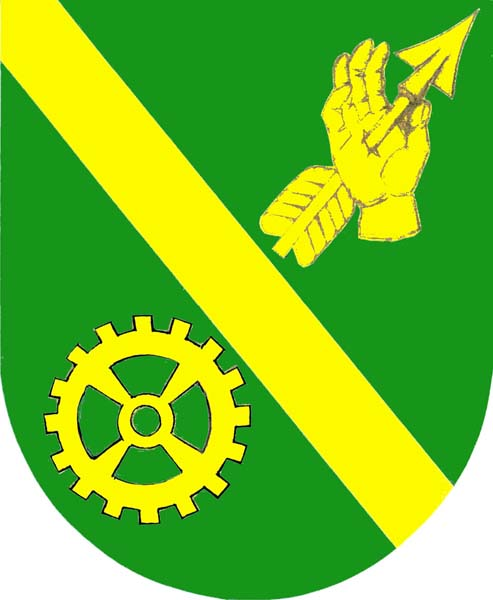
- Flag Coat of arms

- Location in the Czech Republic
- Coordinates: 50°19′17″N 14°24′1″E
- Country: Czech Republic
- Region: Central Bohemian
- District: Mělník
- First mentioned: 1223

Area
  - Total: 10.00 km^{2} (3.86 sq mi)
- Elevation: 164 m (538 ft)

Population (2026-01-01)
  - Total: 1,587
  - Density: 158.7/km^{2} (411.0/sq mi)
- Time zone: UTC+1 (CET)
  - Summer (DST): UTC+2 (CEST)
- Postal code: 277 06
- Website: www.luzec.cz

Lužec nad Vltavou is a municipality and village in Mělník District in the Central Bohemian Region of the Czech Republic. It has about 1,500 inhabitants.

== Administrative division ==
Lužec nad Vltavou consists of two municipal parts (in brackets population according to the 2021 census):

- Lužec nad Vltavou (1,347)
- Chramostek (76)

== Etymology ==
The name Lužec is a diminutive of the Czech word luh, i.e. 'floodplain'.

== Geography ==
Lužec nad Vltavou is located about 6 kilometres (4 mi) west of Mělník and 22 km (14 mi) north of Prague. It lies in a flat agricultural landscape in the Central Elbe Table.

The municipality is situated on the left bank of the Vltava River. In 1902–1905, the artificial channed of the Vltava called Vraňansko-hořínský plavební kanál was built north of the village of Lužec nad Vltavou. Since then, both Lužec nad Vltavou and Chramostek have been almost entirely on an island called Lužecký ostrov. It is the only Czech municipality with such a location.

== History ==
The first written mention of Lužec nad Vltavou is from 1223. The almost entire village was destroyed by the 1760 fire. In 1890 and 2002, Lužec nad Vltavou was badly damaged by floods.

== Demographics ==
Historical population

Year	Pop.	±%
1869	921	—
1880	1,051	+14.1%
1890	1,266	+20.5%
1900	1,139	−10.0%
1910	1,056	−7.3%

Year	Pop.	±%
1921	1,133	+7.3%
1930	1,138	+0.4%
1950	985	−13.4%
1961	1,037	+5.3%
1970	1,300	+25.4%

Year	Pop.	±%
1980	1,275	−1.9%
1991	1,244	−2.4%
2001	1,383	+11.2%
2011	1,399	+1.2%
2021	1,423	+1.7%

Source: Censuses

== Transport ==
The I/16 road (the section from Mělník to Slaný) runs through the municipality.

== Sights ==
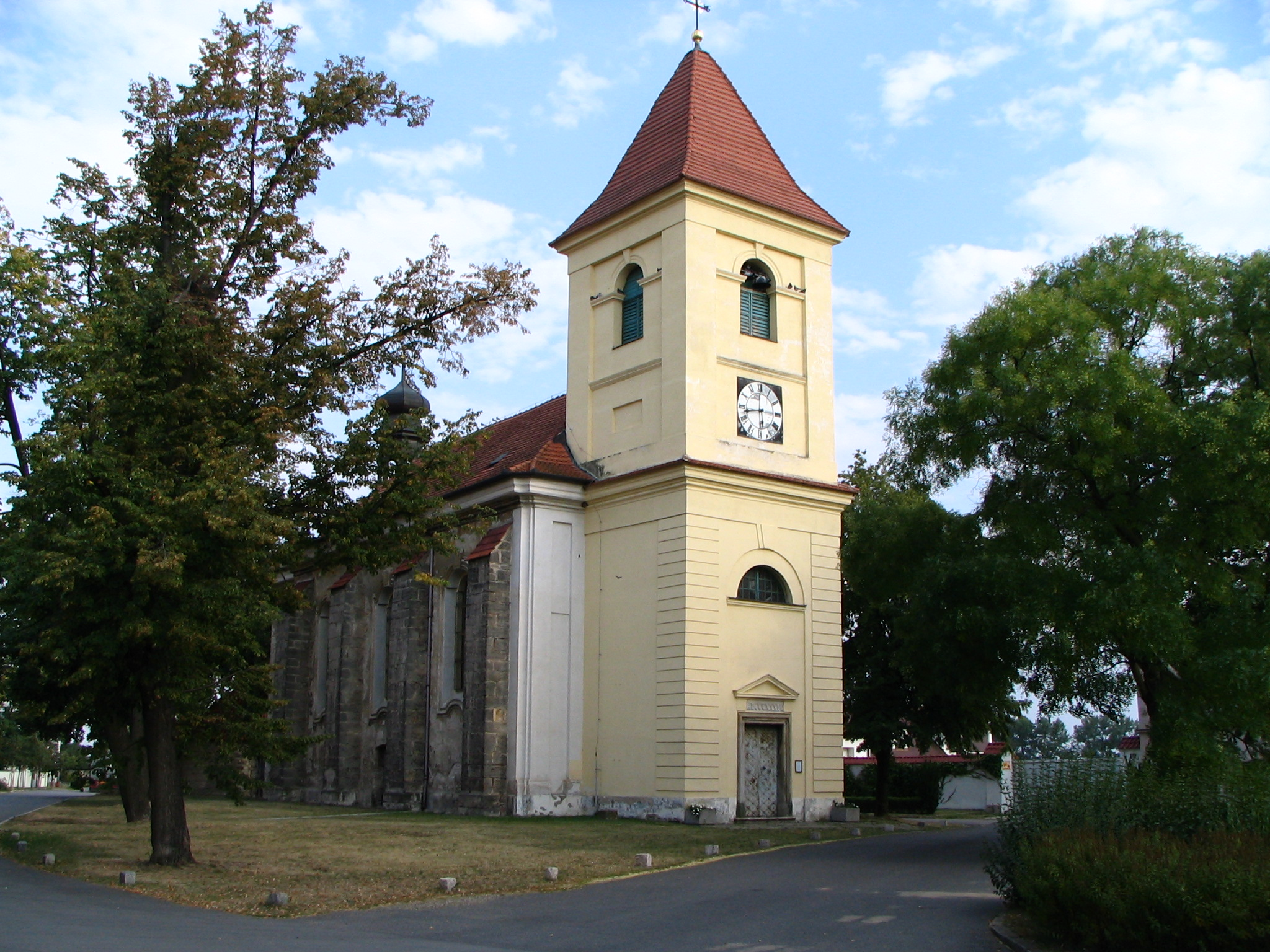
Church of Saint Giles

The main landmark of Lužec nad Vltavou is the Church of Saint Giles. It was built in the Baroque style in 1762.

== Notable people ==
- Miloš Jiránek (1875–1911), painter, art critic and writer
