= Kalibův zločin =

Kalibův zločin is a Czech novel by Karel Václav Rais. It was first published in a magazine in 1892, before being published in book form in 1895.
