= Miloš Jiránek =

Czech painter, translator and writer

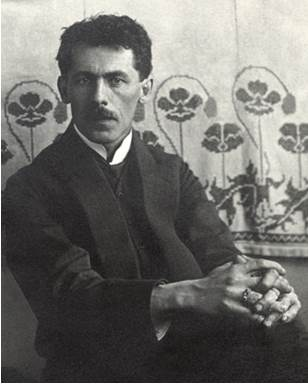
Miloš Jiránek (c. 1910)

Miloš Jiránek (19 November 1875 – 2 November 1911) was a Czech Neo-Impressionist painter, art critic and writer.

== Biography ==
Jiránek was born on 19 November 1875 in Lužec nad Vltavou. His father was a landowner and his mother came from a wealthy peasant family. While attending primary school in Prague, he lived with Jaroslav Vrchlický, where he had access to a huge library. He mastered foreign languages easily and read many books in the original. In 1894, he studied at the Faculty of Arts, Charles University. The following year, he transferred to the Academy of Fine Arts, where he began his studies with Maximilian Pirner and continued in the workshop of Vojtěch Hynais. In 1897, he joined the Mánes Union of Fine Arts.

In 1900, he travelled to Munich, Venice and Trieste, then accompanied his friend, Arnošt Hofbauer, to the Exposition Universelle, where he met Auguste Rodin. A few years later, he would play a major role in introducing the works of Rodin and Edvard Munch to Prague. He also spent three years in Slovakia, creating a cycle on the Tatra Mountains.

In 1905 he married the painter, Antonína Zedniková. For a time, they lived in Hradčany, where they painted some unconventional views of Prague Castle. In 1910, he had his first solo exhibition, at the Topičův salon. Later that year he had what was described as a "nervous breakdown". He died of tubercular meningitis on 2 November 1911 in Prague, at the age of 36. He was buried in Olšany Cemetery.

== Selected paintings ==
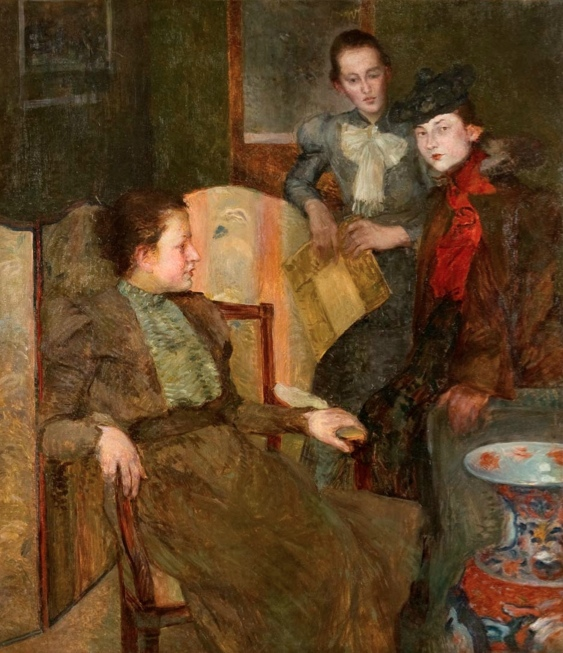
The Visit

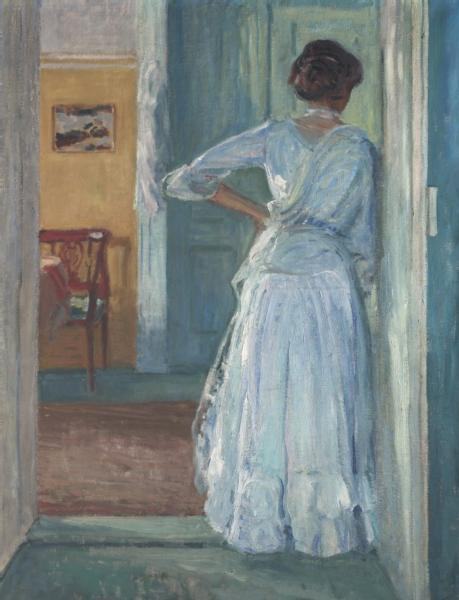
Study II

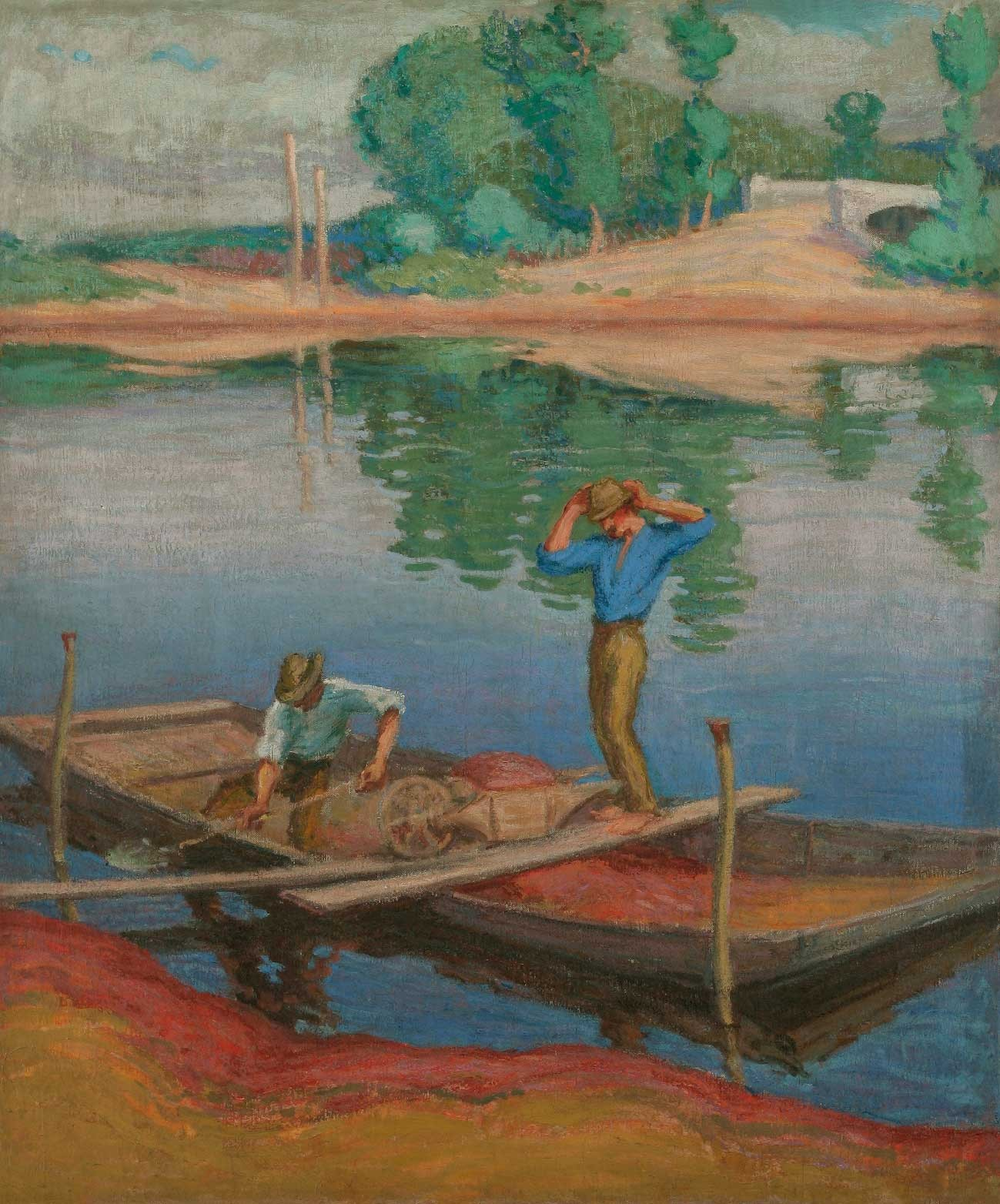
Sandstone

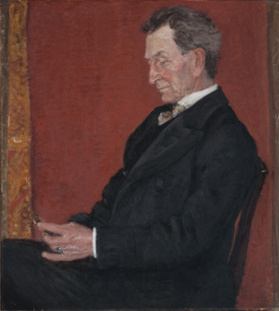
August Švagrovský, businessman and art patron

== Writings ==
- Josef Mánes (illustrated biography), Union of Fine Arts, 1909 Online @ Kramerius
