= On the Sunny Side (1933 film) =

- Directed by: Vladislav Vančura
- Screenplay by: Vítězslav Nezval; Roman Jakobson; Miloslav Disman
- Produced by: Julius Schmitt
- Cinematography: Jan Stallich; Jaroslav Blažek
- Edited by: Jiří Slavíček
- Music by: Jiří Fiala; Eman Fiala
- Production company: AB
- Distributed by: AB
- Release date: 1 December 1933
- Running time: 74 minutes
- Country: Czechoslovakia
- Language: Czech

On the Sunny Side (Czech: Na sluneční straně) is a 1933 Czech drama film by the director Vladislav Vančura. The film is a social drama dealing with the themes of children poverty and neglect.

== Plot ==
Babula is growing up in a rich family, but she's neglected by her parents. She's friends with a son of her family's maid, Honza. When Honza and his mother are thrown out by Babula's father, the two children perform on the streets to earn money. They get arrested and Honza is sent to a children's home 'On the Sunny Side'. Babula's mother tries to commit suicide and Alžběta is sent to the same place. In the children's home their lives get better under the influence of their progressive teacher.

== Cast ==
- Václav Vydra as Josef Rezek
- Zdeňka Gräfová as Rezek's wife
- Babula Treybalová as Alžběta "Babula" Rezková
- Magda Kopřivová as Maid Anežka Kolbenová
- Petr Schulhoff as Honza, son of Anežka
- Jindřich Plachta as Teacher
- Čeněk Šlégl as Counsellor
- Růžena Šlemrová as Children's home director
- Ludvík Veverka as Seidl
- Hana Beckmannová as Insurance company agent Willi

== Production ==
Vančura was a Marxist and his ideas for the movie were influenced by a Russian educator Anton Makarenko. The screenplay was written by an avantgarde writer Vítězslav Nezval, a literary theorist Roman Jakobson and a pedagogue Miloslav Disman. The film was shot in the streets of Prague. The children's home scenes were shot at Zbraslav Monastery.

== Release ==
The premiere was held in Prague on 1 December 1933. The film was received negatively by film critics. The reviews mentioned amateurish direction and technical qualities of the movie. In 2017 the film was screened at MoMA as a part of Czech cinema retrospective 'Ecstasy and Irony: Czech Cinema, 1927–1943'.
