= Jiří Slavíček =

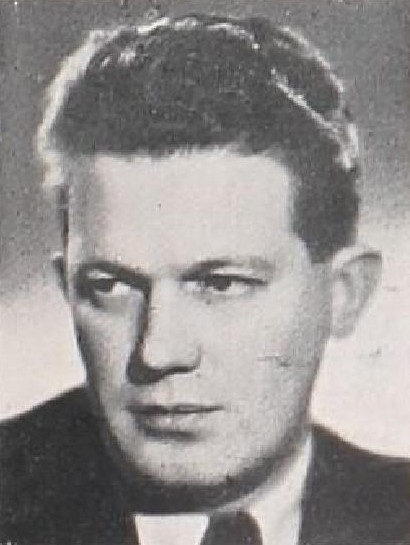
- Jiří Slavíček
- Born: 31 July 1901; Prague, Bohemia, Austria-Hungary
- Died: 18 August 1957 (aged 56); Příbram, Czechoslovakia
- Education: Czech Technical University in Prague
- Occupation(s): Filmmaker, editor
- Years active: 1933–1953

Jiří Slavíček (31 July 1901 – 18 August 1957) was a Czech film editor, director and screenwriter. He is son of painter Antonín Slavíček and brother of Jan Slavíček.

== Career ==
Slavíček studied to be a mechanical engineer at the Czech Technical University in Prague. Instead he followed his desire to become a filmmaker. In 1929, he went on a trip to Hollywood in the United States. He studied film technology and later became an editor.

In 1930, Slavíček returned to Czechoslovakia and worked at the Barrandov Studios as an editor. He later began directing screenplays he wrote.

After the war he was involved in organizing and teaching activities, he worked as the director of the nationalized Barrandov Studios as well as a teacher at the Secondary Film School in Čimelice.

== Filmography ==
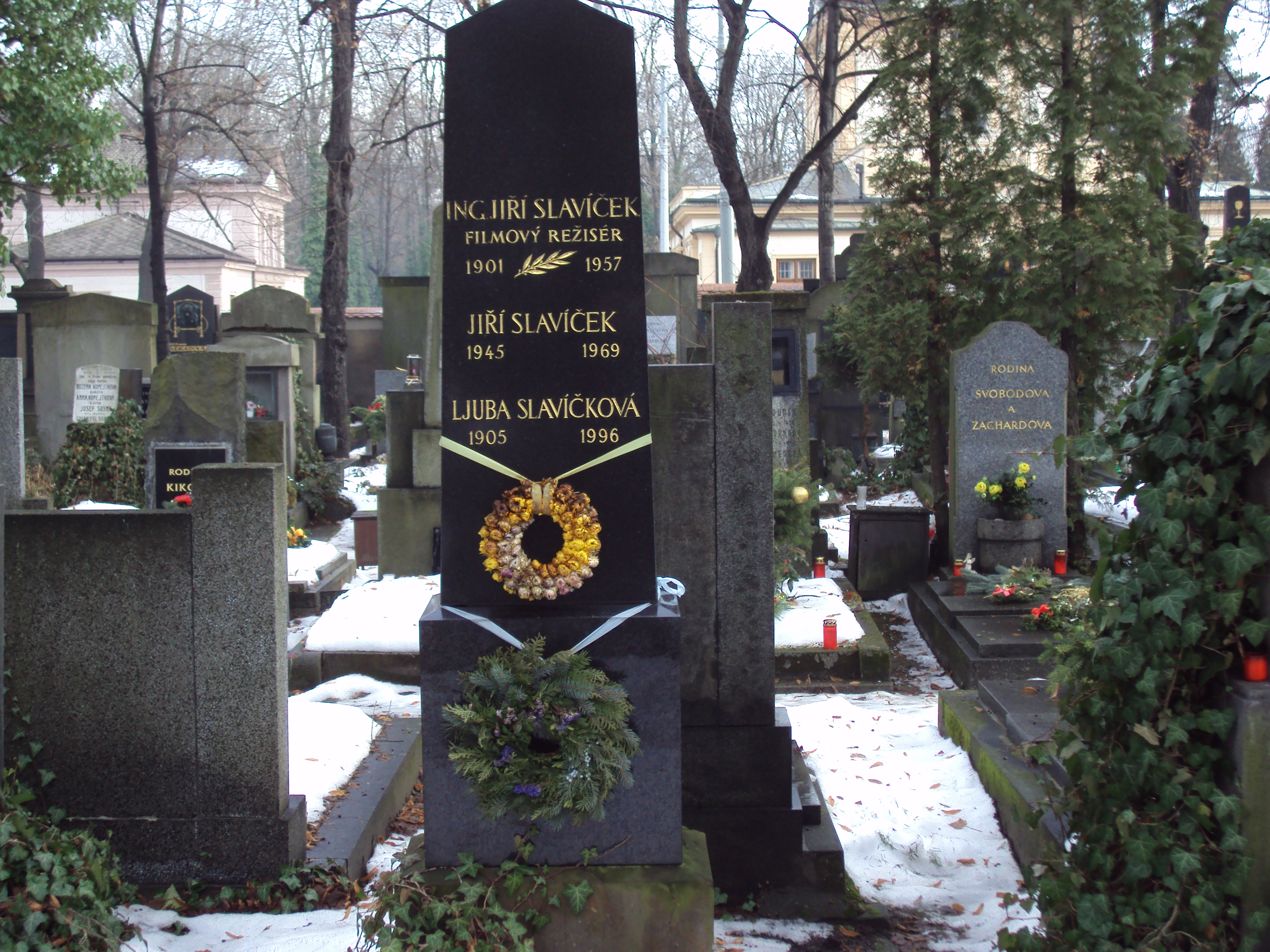
Tomb of Jiří Slavíček at Olšany Cemetery

=== Director ===
- Jarča's Professor (1937)
- Army Twins (1937)
- The Court of God (1938)
- Upside Down (1938)
- The Way of the Cross (1938)
- The Star from the Back of Beyond (1939)
- Zborov (1938)
- The Paths of Life (1940)
- The Old Man Bezoušek (1941)
- The Boys on the River (1944)
- The Portrait (1947)
- Number Seventy-Two (1948)
- Today at Half Past Ten (1949)
- The Murderer's Gorge (1951)
- The End of Ghosts (1952)

=== Editor ===
- On the Sunny Side (1933)
- The Good Tramp Bernášek (1933)
- Army Life – Cheerful Life (1934)
- Grandhotel Nevada (1934)
- Marijka the Unfaithful (1934)
- Student's Mother (1935)
- Milan Rastislav Štefánik (1935)
- One in a Million (1935)
- Three Men in the Snow 1936)
- Heart at Dusk (1936)
- The Golem (1936)
- Eva's Divorce (1937)
- Children to Order (1938)
