= Bechlín =

- Municipality
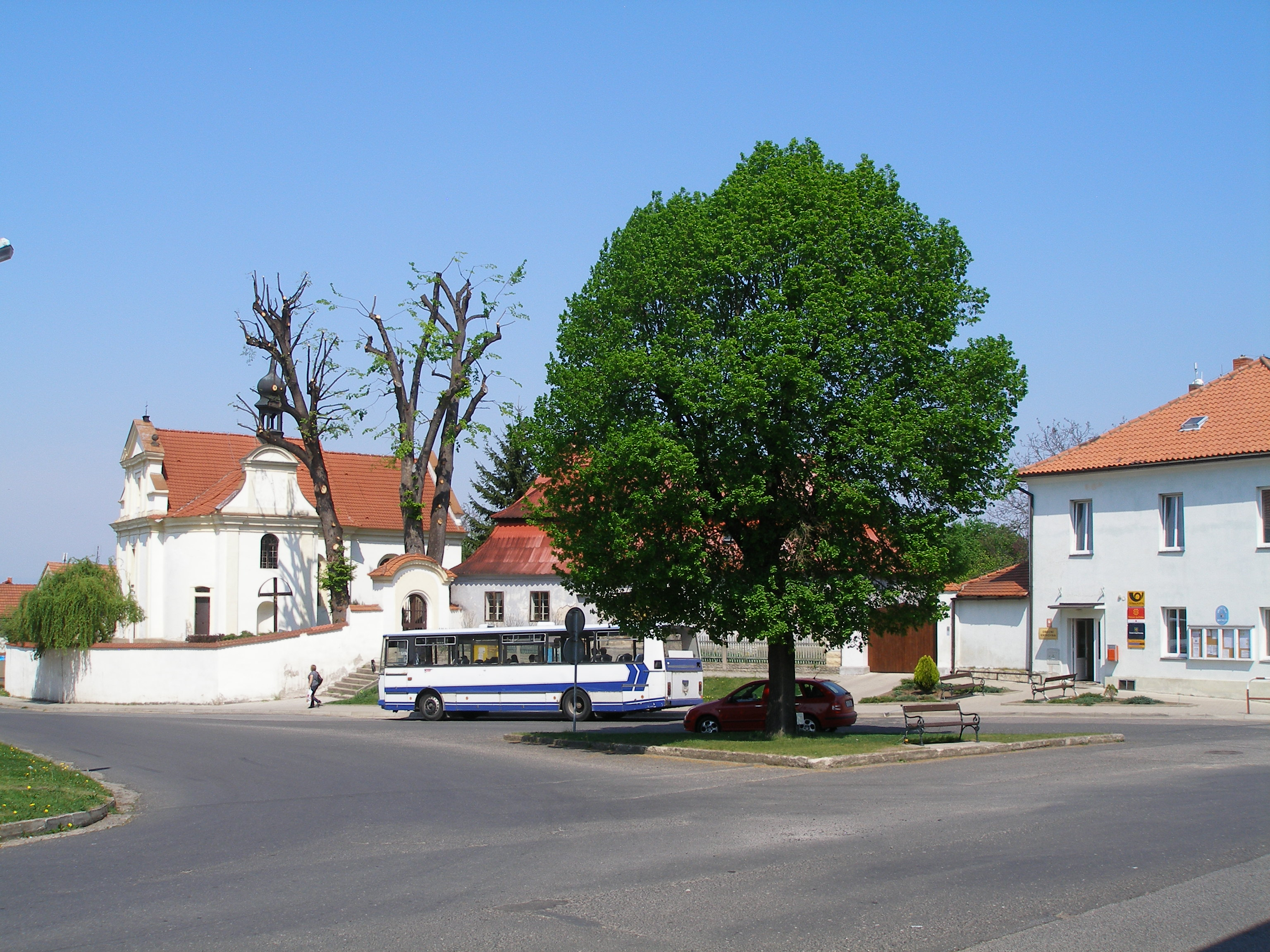
- Centre of Bechlín

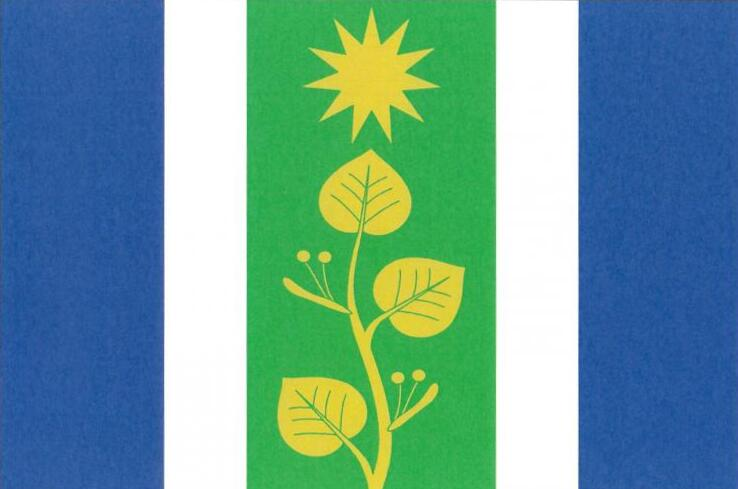
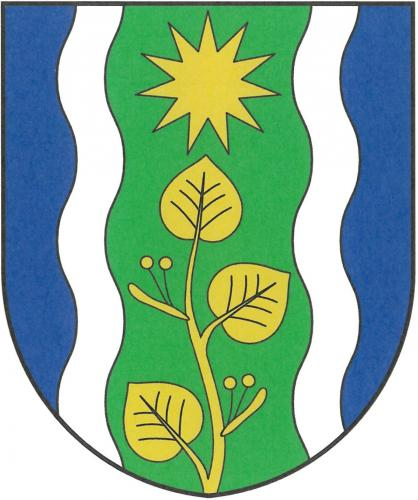
- Flag Coat of arms

- Location in the Czech Republic
- Coordinates: 50°24′58″N 14°20′28″E
- Country: Czech Republic
- Region: Ústí nad Labem
- District: Litoměřice
- First mentioned: 1295

Area
  - Total: 15.25 km^{2} (5.89 sq mi)
- Elevation: 209 m (686 ft)

Population (2026-01-01)
  - Total: 1,334
  - Density: 87.48/km^{2} (226.6/sq mi)
- Time zone: UTC+1 (CET)
  - Summer (DST): UTC+2 (CEST)
- Postal code: 411 86
- Website: www.bechlin.cz

Bechlín is a municipality and village in Litoměřice District in the Ústí nad Labem Region of the Czech Republic. It has about 1,300 inhabitants.

== Administrative division ==
Bechlín consists of two municipal parts (in brackets population according to the 2021 census):

- Bechlín (754)
- Předonín (499)

== Etymology ==
The name is derived from the personal name Bechla, meaning "Bechla's (court)".

== Geography ==
Bechlín is located about 20 kilometres (12 mi) southeast of Litoměřice and 33 km (21 mi) north of Prague. It lies in the Lower Ohře Table, in the Polabí lowlands. The highest point is at 269 m (883 ft) above sea level.

== History ==
The first written mention of Bechlín is from 1295. At the end of the 13th century, the village was divided into three parts with different owners and this division lasted until 1918. Among the notable noble families that owned some of the parts were Trčka of Lípa, Lobkowicz and Desfours-Walderode.

== Demographics ==
Historical population

| Year | Pop. | ±% |
|---|---|---|
| 1869 | 1,074 | — |
| 1880 | 1,096 | +2.0% |
| 1890 | 1,165 | +6.3% |
| 1900 | 1,264 | +8.5% |
| 1910 | 1,406 | +11.2% |

| Year | Pop. | ±% |
|---|---|---|
| 1921 | 1,405 | −0.1% |
| 1930 | 1,492 | +6.2% |
| 1950 | 1,275 | −14.5% |
| 1961 | 1,376 | +7.9% |
| 1970 | 1,250 | −9.2% |

| Year | Pop. | ±% |
|---|---|---|
| 1980 | 1,145 | −8.4% |
| 1991 | 1,082 | −5.5% |
| 2001 | 1,114 | +3.0% |
| 2011 | 1,175 | +5.5% |
| 2021 | 1,253 | +6.6% |

Source: Censuses

== Transport ==
There are no railways or major roads passing through the municipality.

== Sights ==
The main landmark of Bechlín is the Church of Saint Wenceslaus. Originally a Gothic church, it was founded in the third quarter of the 13th century. It was reconstructed after a fire in 1697 and then rebuilt in the Baroque style in 1786.
