= Zapad-4 =

Suburb of Minsk, Belarus

Zapad-4 is a neighborhood in the Frunzyenski District of Minsk, where factories employing blind or visually impaired people are predominant. These factories were built during the Soviet era, when incentives were given to factories which had more than 50% of their employees as persons with disability. The neighborhood was created in the 1980s. "Svetopribor" (Russian: "Светоприбор"), a manufacturer of components for electric lighting, is the biggest employer in this suburb. After the fall of the USSR, the factory's revenues declined. Between 1,000 and 4,000 visually impaired persons live in the neighborhood.
