= Západ =

Novel by Karel Václav Rais

1899 edition

Západ (román) is a Czech novel, written by Karel Václav Rais. It was first published in 1896.

The novel shows the "west" - the end - of the life of the ninety-two-year-old village priest Kalous, with his opinions, evaluation of the life he has lived, and his coming to terms with the approaching and inevitable end. It is a probe into the last moments of the life of a man of morally strong principles, who gradually loses his loved ones and friends who are dying of old age, in order to face loneliness, in which he nevertheless tries to find pieces of joy in ordinary and simple things and interpersonal relationships.
