= Karel Václav Rais =

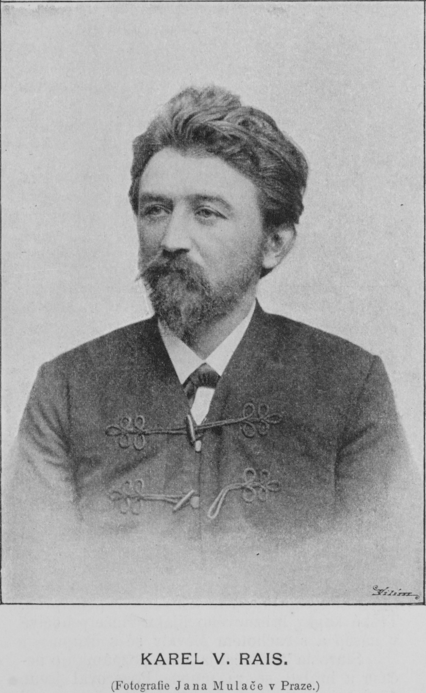
Rais in 1896

Karel Václav Rais (4 January 1859 – 8 July 1926) was a Czech writer and poet. He was a realist novelist and author of the so-called country prose. but he also wrote numerous books for youth and children.

== Biography ==
Rais was born into the family of a simple farm laborer and weaver. He studied in Jičín and Prague. In the latter one, since 1899, he was director of the citizen school in Vinohrady. During his life in Prague he kept in touch with many Czech artists, including Alois Jirásek, Zikmund Winter, Josef Václav Sládek, Ignát Herrmann, and Josef Thomayer.

He was one of the editors of the magazine Zvon, and wrote contributions to numerous other magazines as well. He was a member of the board of the literary company Máj and the society for national education Svatobor.

He died in 1926 and he was buried in Vinohrady Cemetery.

== Selected works ==
- Kalibův zločin - 1895
- Západ - 1896

== See also ==
- List of Czech writers
