= Svatopluk Pitra =

Czech artist (1923 – 1993)

- Born: 9 March 1923; Štěnec, Czechoslovakia
- Died: 15 July 1993 (aged 70); New York, New York
- Education: Academy of Arts, Architecture and Design in Prague
- Occupations: graphic designer, illustrator, designer of animated films, cartoonist, painter

Svatopluk Pitra (9 March 1923 – 15 July 1993) was a Czech graphic designer, illustrator, cartoonist, designer of animated films and painter. He graduated from the Academy of Arts, Architecture and Design in Prague. At first he became known as a cartoonist. He began working on animated films in the late 1950s. In collaboration with directors such as Břetislav Pojar, Jiří Brdečka and Stanislav Látal, he designed cartoon and puppet films. In 1963 Pitra emigrated to Canada. He lived in the US from the mid-1960s. While in Canada, he worked for the National Film Board of Canada as a creator of advertising and promotional films.

== Life and work in Czechoslovakia 1923–1963 ==
Svatopluk Pitra was born on 9 March 1923 in the small village of Štěnec (now part of Jenišovice). His childhood was spent in a former mill with his mother's parents. In 1929 he moved to Poděbrady along with his mother and older brother Bohumil, where he started attending elementary school. Even many years later he could still remember his first school assignment: drawing six rows of vertical lines that gradually transformed into ones.

Starting in 1935 he attended the grammar school in Vysoké Mýto. Due to poor grades, in fourth year he had to leave for a two-year Amelioration School, which he successfully completed. During his two years of military service in the years 1945 to 1947 he was assigned to the cartographers. Subsequently, he went to work at the Pipe Rolling Mill in Chomutov as a technical draughtsman. As a reward for discovering an error in technical documentation, he received a recommendation for university studies in 1951 and was accepted to the Special Studio of Animated and Puppet Film under professor Adolf Hoffmeister at the Academy of Arts, Architecture and Design in Prague. His classmates included Vratislav Hlavatý, Zdeněk Kirchner, Ladislav Rada, Šárka Kašpaříková (Šefranková) and Jaroslava Nesvadbová. During his studies he married and shortly thereafter divorced Milica Kudrnová, who became the mother of his only son Torsten.

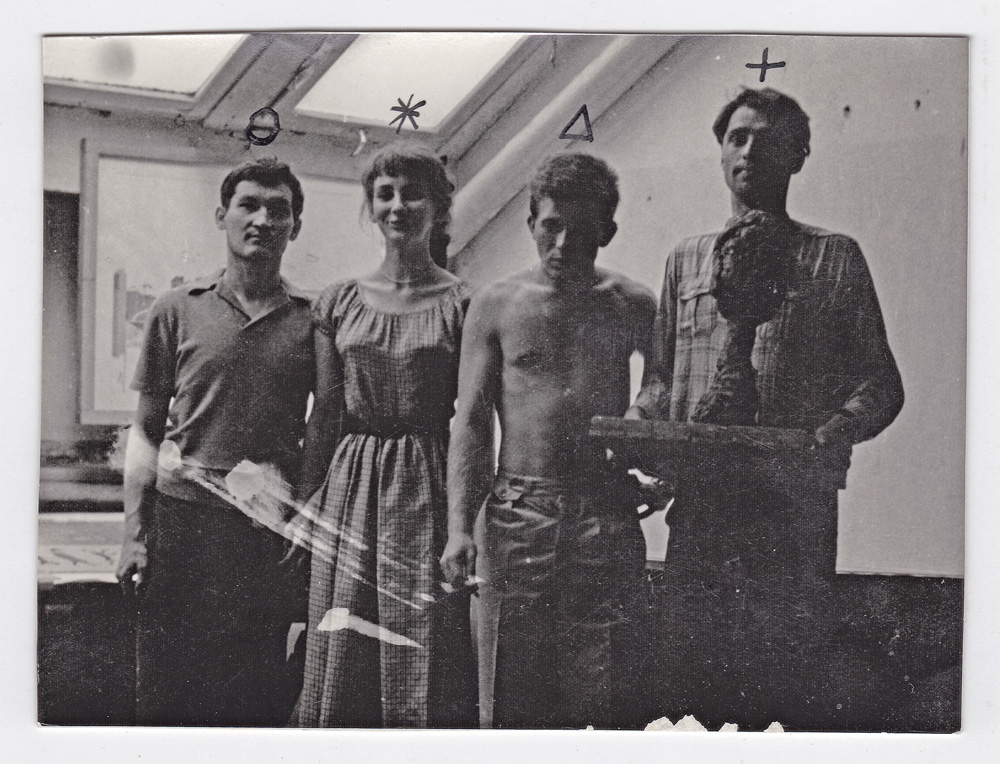
Svatopluk Pitra, Šárka Kašpaříková, Zdeněk Kirchner and Vratislav Hlavatý in the animated and puppet film studio at the Academy of Arts, Architecture and Design in Prague, 1956.

While working at the studio Pitra did not shun drawing based on a model, but he very quickly found his own style, at first relying on a ruler and French curve, with which he constructed pronounced figures formed with a strong line and sharp contrasts of black and white areas. He was just as masterful in handling lettering, which he placed in his drawings in the form of various signs and labels. Pitra admired the drawings of František Bidlo and above all the portrait shorthand of his professor Adolf Hoffmeister, for whom the medium was a "mask that is truer than the face". Pitra also understood drawing as a record of his internal life that was to be rendered with as economical means of expression as possible.

Telling is the account of the difficulties he encountered when trying to take out the First Republic magazine Simplicus from the University Library. Although they acquiesced in the end, they apparently first "interrogated" him on what he needs the magazine for and then demanded a "confirmation of a true need to study the item".

Pitra had his first exhibition in 1957 along with schoolmate Vratislav Hlavatý in the prestigious Czechoslovak Writer Gallery in Prague. Originally, professor Hoffmeister himself was to appear in the former Topičův salon vystoupit i sám professor Hoffmeister, but in complete secrecy he relinquished the whole space to his two students. He introduced them at the opening for the show Caricature and Other Unpleasantries as a new hope for Czech humorous drawing, which in his words was wasting away in the shroud of the magazine Dikobraz. At the exhibition Pitra displayed cartoons and photo montages, clips from his graduate animated film Klobouk ve křoví[Hat in the Bushes], anti-war and advertising posters, and designs for record sleeves and book covers.

In his review of the exhibition, Miloš Macourek praised Pitra's "keen-edged wit and political involvement" and expressed the conviction that the author would no doubt soon establish himself in the broad field of practical graphic art as well. He was not wrong in this prediction. After completing school, Pitra began to work as a graphic designer for domestic and international trade fairs; among other things, he participated in the graphic design for the Czechoslovak pavilion at the EXPO 58 World's Fair in Brussels. Much like his schoolmate Ladislav Rada, he also designed advertisements, posters and record covers for Gramofonové závody – Supraphon.

At the start of 1959 he sent in a set of caricatures for a competition announced by the editorial board of Literární noviny. Up against more than eight hundred participants, the jury found Pitra's satirical drawings to be the most interesting, "artistically clear, almost cruelly exact". The award Literární noviny confirmed the distinguished position Pitra had taken on at the turn of the sixties in the circle of cartoonists associated in the Polylegran group. Cartoonists were abandoning illustrated anecdotes and wordy civic satire, ceasing to use dialogues and even monologue captions and began exploring the possibilities of semantically encoding the drawing itself. Some invented sharp-witted absurdities, others sought out a universal language in the tangled world of lines. Foreign-policy and anti-fascist caricature had considerable prestige in the official art scene. Svatopluk Pitra took part in a large show of anti-war drawings and collages called To Be or Not To Be, organised in 1961 for the 40th anniversary of the founding of the Czechoslovak Communist Party, along with Adolf Born, Oldřich Jelínek, Miroslav Liďák, Vladimír Hlavín, Vladimír Jiránek, Václav Kabát, Jiří Kalousek, Milan Kopřiva, Jaroslav Malák, Zdeněk Mézl, Jiří Šalamoun, Františk Skála sr., Bohumil Štěpán, Jiří Toman, Josef Žemlička, Jiří Žentel and Jaroslav Weigel.

Drawing was to "work with poetic metaphors like poetry, conflicts like drama, and sequencing surprising contrasts and contexts like a film montage". Adolf Hoffmeister became the patron of this new wave of Czech artistic humour, though the genealogical lines led more towards western artists such as Raymond Peynet, Jean-Maurice Bosc, Maurice Sinet and especially Saul Steinberg, Saul Steinberg, who showed Czech cartoonists that a line can be "drawn in such a way so as to reveal the ridiculous side of reality more deeply than a sophisticated replica, so as to evoke amazement, embarrassment, disgust and laughter all together". The first Czech anthology of Steinberg's drawings appeared on the shelves of Czech book shops in 1959 with a cover by Svatopluk Pitra, who had debuted in book illustration the previous year when he accompanied a collection of satirical texts by Jiří Robert Pick entitled Kladyátor. with his rough-hewn characters. At the end of the fifties Pitra also illustrated Jirotka's Saturnin and Emil Vachek's satirical novel Až se ucho utrhne. Both titles came out in the Humour and Satire Edition, which was issued by the Československý spisovatel.

Pitra's drawings were aptly characterised by the artist's friend, cartoonist, illustrator and creator of animated films Jaroslav Malák: "[Pitra] is cruelly critical of humanity as a whole and of the depicted individuals. Though he draws very beautiful women, they are all actually beasts [...]. Pitra treats the other half of the population, men, even worse. I don't know a single drawing of Pitra's that depicts a model husband, a good father and breadwinner of a nice family. On the other hand Pitra has depicted a plethora of fraudsters, cardsharps, gangsters, corrupt politicians, detectives and the oddest of individuals." We can find a whole gallery of such characters in Pitra's illustrations for the detective stories by Alexandr Grin, Agatha Christie, Dashiell Hammett, Seičó Macumota and Georges Simenon, that came out in the year 1962 in the seventh annual revue Světová literatura [World Literature].

Another frequent motif of Pitra's drawings was vehicles: motorcycles, cars, planes or helicopters. He shared this admiration for modern technology with his peers Dobroslav Foll or Teodor Rotrekl, who formed the core of the artistic group Radar along with other Academy of Arts, Architecture and Design in Prague classmates at the end of the fifties. For Pitra, however, the interest in human nature predominated. This is also evident in his drawings for Eternity Lost by Clifford D. Simak the anthology Labyrint (SNKLU, 1962), organised by Adolf Hoffmeister. At the time when this remarkable collection of western science-fiction stories came out, Pitra was already fully involved in artistic design for animated and puppet films at the studio Bratři v triku.

== Animated film designer 1957–1963 ==
Pitra's first animated films were made at the advertising business Propag, where he designed puppets for a piece by director Josef Kluge on family shopping at department stores Vánoce (Christmas) (1957). He also drew and self-directed Atomic Century (Timely Purchase of Fuel) (1957). He is also listed as designer and director for the advertising pieces An Idea from Heaven (1957) a That's Not How It's Done (1957), which promoted the advantages of newly introduced self-service retail. Of the four-part series Samoobsluha it is likely that only Who Asks for What has been preserved. The illustrated anecdotes in it were drawn by Pitra's colleague Jaroslav Malák, core cartoonist for Dikobraz and one of the founders of the association of caricaturists Polylegran.

In 1959 Pitra took part in the film experiment Tucet mých tatínků, in which director Eduard Hofman used the work of thirteen different artists. For this "tragic cartoon", Pitra designed the character of the photographer dad. Aside from the director Eduard Hofman, himself, who drew the character of the policeman, the artists were, Jiří Brdečka (scuba diver), František Freiwillig (ship's captain), Vratislav Hlavatý (lifeguard), Adolf Hoffmeister (scientist), Ota Janeček (drummer), Josef Kábrt (opera singer), Jaroslav Kándl (painter), Vladimír Lehký (student), Kamil Lhoták (pilot), Jaroslav Malák (hairdresser) a Zdeněk Miler (little girl and mother).

For the satirical cartoon Tři muži (1959) by director Vladimír Lehký he contributed extremely simplified drawings reminiscent of the figures from the cartoons of Émile Cohl. This morality play on the consequences of irresponsible behaviour received an award at the International Festival in Venice. Pitra did not however receive the travel permit that would allow him to receive the prize in person.

Pitra designed 2D and 3D puppets for director Břetislav Pojar Jak zaříditi byt (How to Furnish a Flat) (1959). In the short introduction the piece amusingly summarises the prehistory and history of furniture culture, subsequently promoting rational placement of modern home furnishings.

Pitra also took part as a designer in Břetislav Pojar and Jiří Brdečka movie Sláva (Fame) (1959). The story about a chimney that did not smoke just for its own sake, but actually artistically, was situated in a Western-style major city that was supposed to lie far beyond the borders of socialist Czechoslovakia, but can be read as an illustration of the famous proverb about the impermanence of every worldly glory.

In comparison with the highly ironic caricatures of snobbish consumers of artistic sensations, the puppets that he designed for Bohuslav Šrámek's animated film Pštros (Ostrich) (1960), were much more benevolent. Also pleasantly rounded were the figures of the puppet film Plivník dlaždiče Housky (1961), based on the eponymous story by Karel Michal and filmed by director Stanislav Látal. The disposition of the individual characters was rounded out inimitably by the voice of Rudolf Deyl, jr., who convincingly portrayed Houska's indecisive resignation, the self-satisfied pedantry of the enterprise officials, and the chicken-imp's maniacal energy. Pitra's artistic design for the film Cecilie 470 (1961), which director Jan Karpaš filmed based on the story by Miloš Macourek, was characterised by an elegant painting of stylish "Brussels" graphics. Pitra used a similar artistic concept in the animated film by director Bohuslava Šrámka Blecha (Flea) (1961) about an insignificant creature obsessed with a megalomaniacal delusion.

Svatopluk Pitra, who at the time was quite overworked, suffered a legitimate feeling of insufficient appreciation. He bore the contrast between his abilities and their pitiful financial reward just as hard as his exhausting and vain search for his own studio. After the propaganda piece Tři muži na rybách (Three Men Fishing) (1962), pointing out the advantages of working in shifts, the last film Pitra worked on in Czechoslovakia was an awareness piece by director and screenwriter Jiří Brdečka Tak na to? (So Shall We?). When the imaginative and humorous film about the need to observe good habits when losing weight reached Czech cinemas in mid-1963, the artist's name was not even mentioned in the credits.

== The American years 1963–1993 ==
The reason was that in spring of 1963, Pitra took advantage of a trip to Cuba that Československá televise and Krátký film, had arranged for creative employees and, on the return during a stopover in Halifax, Nova Scotia, he applied for political asylum. The successful and confident forty-year-old graphic designer had no doubt he would make his way in this new environment just as well as he had in Czechoslovakia. The beginnings were indeed promising. Pitra found work in the government production and distribution company the National Film Board of Canada as a creator of advertising and promotional films. Of course he only accepted this well paid employment as a temporary solution until he could learn English and get a permit to travel to the USA. He was particularly happy with having his own home and also with the enormous amount of cheap jazz records. Though at night he dreamed of wild chases with Prague cops, he felt finally free. He started working on the animated film The Kind Dictator (Laskavý diktátor), the idea for which he wanted to pitch to a Canadian or American producer. At the time he sent his girlfriend and former classmate from Academy of Arts, Architecture and Design in Prague Irena Bryndová in Prague a drawing on which "Mr Nikita Khrushchev" is approaching the naked buttocks of a chained victim with a syringe.

In light of the difficult pronunciation of the name Svatopluk, while living in Canada he began to sign his name S. Paul Pitra. Later he would sign his work with ART-TIP, a play on words with the ananym of his surname. In Prague he was meanwhile convicted of illegal border crossing and sentenced to three years prison and forfeiture of property. The work that the State Security authorities confiscated at the time is missing today. In July 1964 he received a permit to live in the United States. Much like Vladimír Fuka, whose first visit to New York thrilled him and inspired a number of drawings, Pitra also considered the American metropolis a place where the maddening maze of obstructions would finally lead out into the free world. It was however a world with quite different rules and some of them he was unable to grasp. Though he admired American automobiles, he had no understanding for mass production in what he considered art. He was shocked by certain expressions of American popular culture and in one letter to Irena Bryndova he complained: "The locals are on the level of natives in central Africa! What they like the most is things that shine or glitter!"

In the summer of 1965 he attempted to employ his strongly expressive style of drawing in a competition to decorate the airport in Buffalo. For the forty-metre concrete surface he proposed a figure with a tall top hat and flag of the United States. Though he did not succeed with this idea, at the end of the same year he won a contract for graphic work for the 1967 International and Universal Exposition in Montreal. Though the job brought him his coveted means of subsistence, it did not manage to satisfy his artistic ambitions. It was no different in his next job with greeting card company Hallmark, where he could apply his exceptional spatial imagination and technical gifts in designing three-dimensional paper models of vehicles that were folded up as cards and stood up when unfolded.

In his free time he made puppets and props for animated films, which he wanted to start working on under more auspicious conditions. But even his patented design for a method of parking cars in tight spaces did not help him acquire a greater financial sum that would allow him to realise film projects. "The granted patent protected (Pitra's) invention for a period of twenty years, up until 1988. It was to be expected that an automaker would express interest in utilising it in practice. But it did not happen. Only in 2005 did automaker Nissan publish a description of an almost identical design in Japan..."

After five years of waiting for a permit to travel abroad, Pitra's partner Irena Bryndová came to New York at the start of August 1968. They planned to return to Prague together, but this definitively fell apart following the Soviet occupation of Czechoslovakia. With the prospect of long-term residence in the United States, Irena Bryndová found work as a fabric designer and in October 1969 was married to Svatopluk Pitra.

Though Pitra did not give up on his ideas to create animated films, he could not find a producer for his projects. For this reason he had an animation camera brought in from Vienna and in his New York apartment he created a tripod and electrical control for it. Work constantly ran up against a lack of funding and the film The Kind Dictator remained unfinished. All that remained in the artist's estate was a typewritten script and several drawings.

After ten years living in America, Svatopluk Pitra began to face the consequences of long-untreated diabetes. Though he did not stop drawing, he no longer published the results of his work. Aside from colourful drawings, which he did not first exhibit until the start of the nineties in Prague, he also began painting. He was again most interested by figural motifs; this time they were muted colour figures that often fixed their gaze directly at the viewer. Still lifes and nostalgic looks back at the distant Czech landscape also appeared in his paintings. While at the end of the fifties he constructed sharp verticals of high-rise buildings, among New York's skyscrapers he painted winding streets lined with buildings with red gabled roofs.

Pitra was allowed to visit Czechoslovakia as a citizen of the United States in 1976. He only had his first improvised exhibition, organised by his friends from Polylegran Jaroslav Malák and former graphic designer of Mladý svět Jaroslav Weigel, in the newsroom of Mladá fronta, after the fall of the communist regime in 1991.

Pitra did not however ever return to Praha permanently. He lived in New York up until his death in July of the year 1993.

== Exhibitions ==
- 1957 - Exhibition of Caricatures and Other Unpleasantries by Svatopluk Pitra and Vratislav Hlavatý, Czech Writer Gallery, Prague
- 1961 - To Be or Not To Be, group exhibition of anti-fascist and anti-war cartoons, Czechoslovak Writer Gallery, Prague
- 1961 - 40 Years of Czech Political Cartoons, House of the Lords of Kunštát, Graphics Department, Brno
- 1963 - Artistic Accompaniment to Czechoslovak Gramophone Records, North Bohemian Museum in Liberec, Liberec
- 1991 - Svatopluk Pitra, advertising cafe of Mladá fronta "U jednorožce", Prague
- 1997 - DDas tschechische Plakat der sechziger Jahre, Rosgartenmuseum, Konstanz
- 1997 - Czech Posters of the 60s from the Collection of the Moravian Gallery Brno, Museum of Applied Arts, Brno
- 2007 - Svatopluk Pitra: Paintings, Drawings, Gallery U Betlémské kaple, Prague
- 2010 - Svatopluk Pitra (1923-1993), Vysoké Mýto Municipal Gallery|Městská galerie Vysoké Mýto
- 2013 - SVATOPLUK PITRA, S.P. SVATOPLUK PITRA P.S. LAST MEETING, Nová síň Gallery, Prague

== Catalogues of group exhibitions ==
- Beze slov. Kniha kresleného humoru [Without Words. A Book of Cartoon Humour]. [Introduction] Miroslav Horníček. Prague: Mladá fronta, 1960
- Být či nebýt [To Be or Not To Be. Anthology for 40th anniversary of the Communist Party of Czechoslovakia], Havlíčkův Brod: Krajské nakladatelství, 1961
- 40 let české politické karikatury. Katalog výstavy [40 Years of Czech Political Cartoons. Exhibition Catalogue]. [Introduction] Adolf Hoffmeister. Brno: House of Arts, 1961
- Český plakát 60. let ze sbírek Moravské galerie Brno. Czech posters of the ’60s from the collections of the Moravian Gallery Brno. [Introductory text by Marta Sylvestrová]. Brno: Moravian Gallery, 1997

== Book and magazine illustrations ==
- PICK, Jiří Robert. Kladyátor [Kladiator]. Prague: Mladá fronta, 1958
- VACHEK, Emil. Až se ucho utrhne [When the Bough Breaks]. Prague: Československý spisovatel, 1959
- JIROTKA, Zdeněk. Saturnin. Prague: Československý spisovatel, 1959
- HOFFMEISTER Adolf (ed.) Labyrint (Výbor západních vědecko-fantastických povídek) [Labyrinth (Anthology of Western Science-Fiction Stories). Prague: Státní nakladatelství krásné literatury a umění, 1962
- GRIN, Alexandr. Pension. Světová literatura. 1962, vol. VII, no. 1, pp. 248–255
- CHRISTIE, Agatha. Svědek pro obžalobu. Světová literatura [Witness for the Prosecution. World Literature]. 1962, vol. VII, no. 2, pp. 242–256
- HAMMETT, Dashiell. Muž, který stál v cestě. Světová literatura [The Vicious Circle. World Literature]. 1962, vol. VII, no. 3, pp. 245–255
- MATSUMOTO, Seicho. Neštěstí. Světová literatura [The Accident. World Literature]. 1962, vol. VII, no. 4, pp. 235–256
- SIMENON, Georges. Chudáka by nikdo nevraždil. Světová literatura [No One Would Kill a Poor Man. World Literature]. 1962, vol. VII, no. 5, pp. 238–256

== Record covers ==
- Vítězné písně 3. ročníku soutěže Hledáme písničku pro všední den [Winning Songs of 3rd Annual Competition 'Looking for a Song for Everyday'], Supraphon, 1961
- George Gershwin, Koncert F Dur pro klavír a orchestr [Concerto in F for Solo Piano and Orchestra], Supraphon 1961
- Jazz v Československu 1961 [Jazz in Czechoslovakia 1961], Supraphon, 1962
- Československý jazz 1962 [Czechoslovak Jazz 1962], Supraphon, 1963

== Filmography (designer) ==
- Klobouk ve křoví [Hat in the Bushes], graduate animated film, AAAD in Prague, 1957
- Atomové století (Včasný nákup paliva) [Atomic Century (Timely Purchase of Fuel)], colour animated advertising film, 30 m, directed by Svatopluk Pitra, 1957
- Vánoce [Christmas], colour puppet advertising film, 75 m, directed by Josef Kluge, 1957
- Nápad s nebes (Samoobsluha II) [Idea from Heaven (Self-Service Shop II)], animated advertising film, 50 m, directed by Svatopluk Pitra, 1957
- Tak se to nedělá (Samoobsluha IV) Tak se to nedělá (Samoobsluha IV) [That's Not How It's Done (Self-Service Shop IV)], animated advertising film, directed by Svatopluk Pitra, 1957
- Tři muži [Three Men], colour, animated, 172 m, directed by Vladimír Lehký, 1959
- Tucet mých tatínků [My Dozen Dads], colour, animated, 338 m, directed by Eduard Hofman, 1959
- Jak zaříditi byt [How To Furnish a Flat], colour, limited animation and puppets, directed by Břetislav Pojar, 1959
- Sláva (Komín) [Fame (The Chimney)], colour, animated, 372 m, directed by Břetislav Pojar, 1959
- Pštros (Pštros Jonathan) Ostrich (Jonathan the Ostrich)], colour, puppets, 277 m, directed by Bohuslav Šrámek, 1960
- Cecilie 470 [Cecilia 470], colour, animated, 254 m, directed by Jan Karpaš, 1961
- Plivník dlaždiče Housky [Tile-Setter Houska's Chicken-Imp], colour, puppets, 571 m, directed by Stanislav Látal, 1961
- Blecha [The Flea], colour, animated, length 248 m, directed by Bohuslav Šrámek, 1961
- Tři muži na rybách [Three Men Fishing], colour, animated, 150 m, directed by Vladimír Lehký, 1962
- Tak na to? [So Shall We?], colour, animated, 301 m, directed by Jiří Brdečka, 1963

== Published texts ==
- MACOUREK, Miloš. Dva mladí karikaturisté. Výtvarná práce. 1957, roč. 5, č. 10, s. 8–9
- HOFFMEISTER, Adolf. Svatopluk Pitra a Vratislav Hlavatý, dříve vdova. Výtvarná práce. 1957, roč. 5, č. 10, s. 9
- Výsledky soutěže literárních novin. Literární noviny (II), 1959, roč. 8, číslo 42, s. 6
- BRUKNER, Josef. Co nového v české karikatuře. Plamen. 1960, roč. 2, č. 10, s. 141–142
- Slovník českých a slovenských výtvarných umělců 1950–2003 (XI. Pau - Pop). Ostrava: Výtvarné centrum Chagall, 2003. ISBN 80-86171-16-7
- HORÁKOVÁ, Ljuba. Svatopluk Pitra. Kresby an obrazy ze sbírky Ireny Bryndové-Pitrové. Praha: Irena Pitrová, 2007. ISBN 978-80-239-9398-1
- RYŠKA, Pavel (ed.). SVATOPLUK PITRA: grafik, ilustrátor a výtvarník animovaných filmů (1) Tucet mých tatínků. Olomouc: Pastiche Filmz, 2015. ISBN 978-80-87662-10-6
- RYŠKA, Pavel a ŠRÁMEK, Jan. Pionýři a roboti. Československá ilustrace a vizuální kultura 1950–1970. Praha: Nakladatelství Paseka; Brno: Fakulta výtvarných umění VUT, 2016. ISBN 978-80-7432-745-2
