= Sylva Fischerová =

Czech poet, writer, and philologist

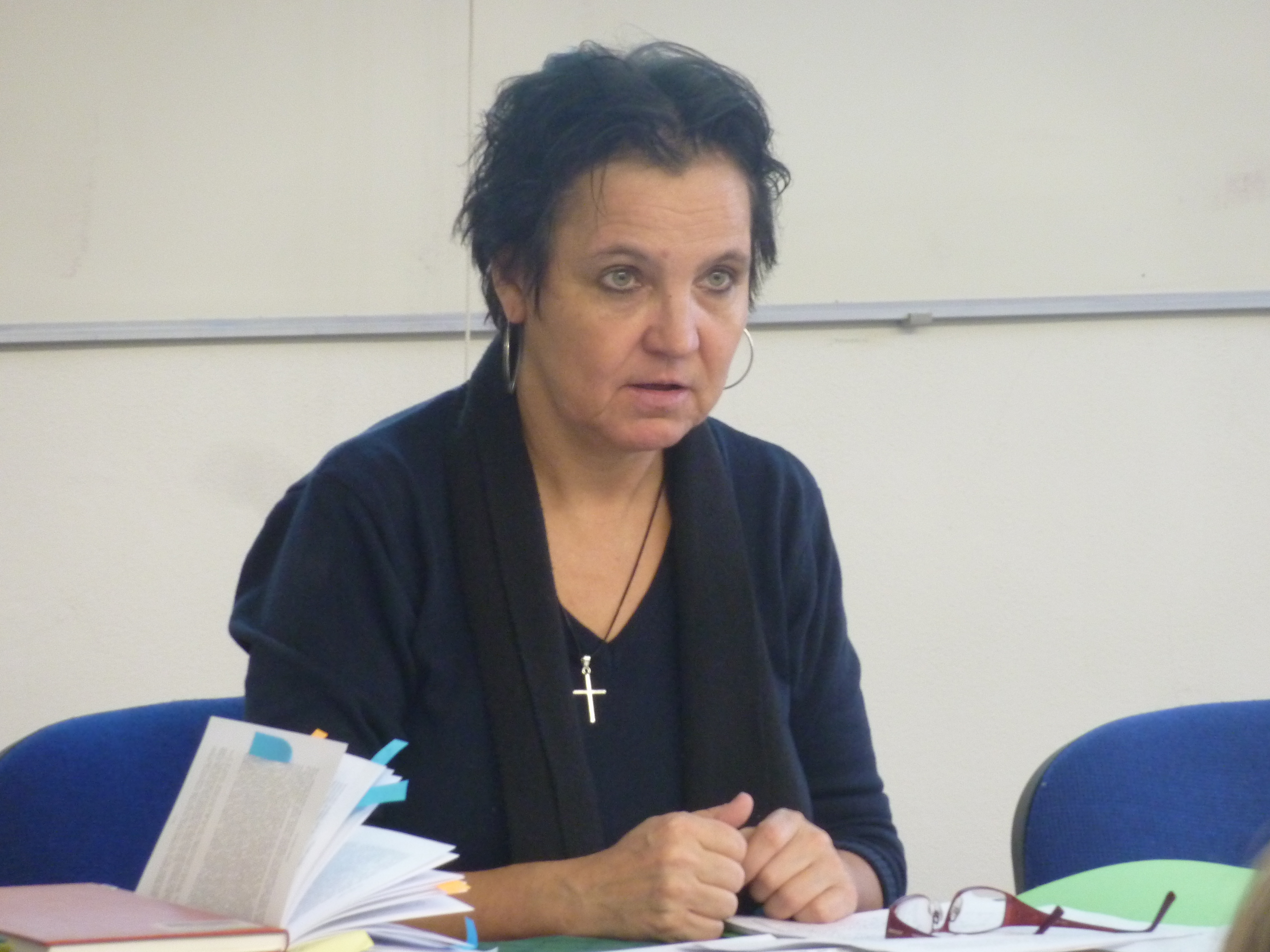
- Born: November 5, 1963 (age 62); Prague, Czechoslovakia
- Education: Charles University Prague
- Occupations: Poet, teacher, editor, anthologist, translator
- Children: Ester Fischerová

Sylva Fischerová (born 5 November 1963, Prague) is a Czech poet, prose writer, editor, anthologist, and teacher and translator of Classical literature and philosophy. She was the first official City Poet of Prague.

== Life ==
Fischerová was born on November 5, 1963, and grew up in Olomouc. She studied French at a language school in Brno, and in 1983 began studies in Philosophy at the Charles University Faculty of Arts in Prague and Physics at the CU Faculty of Mathematics and Physics; in 1985 she transferred to Classical Philology at the same university, where in 1991 she received her M.A., writing her thesis on “The problem of unity of arete in Plato (the Protagoras dialogue)”. She did her post-graduate studies at the same faculty, writing her doctoral dissertation on “Can the Muses Lie? (The Muses in the proem of Hesiod’s Theogony)”.

Since 1992 she has been employed as an assistant professor at the Institute of Greek and Latin Studies at Charles University Prague. In 2020, she obtained her habilitation for her thesis dedicated to the Hippocratic treatise On the Nature of Man. At present she lectures on Classical Greek literature, religion and philosophy. She is the author of twelve collections of poetry, as well as short stories, novels, and books for children.

Her book-long interview with philosopher Karel Floss won the Czech Literary Foundation Prize in 2011.

In 2018 she was named the first City Poet of Prague.

== Family ==
She is the daughter of psychologist Jarmila Fischerová (1926–1992) and Josef Ludvík Fischer, the Czech philosopher and first rector of Palacký University after its re-establishment after WW2, in which he played a major role. Her half-sister Viola Fischerová was also a poet; and Sylva was sister-in-law to writers Karel Michal and Josef Jedlička via marriage to Viola.

Her daughter Ester Fischerová is also a poet, with two collections of poetry published to date.

== Literary works ==
=== Poetry, Prose, Books for Children ===
- Chvění závodních koní (1986)
- Velká zrcadla (1990)
- V podsvětním městě (1994)
- Šance (1999)
- Zázrak (2005)
- Krvavý koleno (2005)
- Júla a Hmýza (2006)
- Anděl na okně (2007)
- Tady za rohem to všechno je (2011)
- Pasáž (2011)
- Egbérie a Olténie (2011)
- Evropa je jako židle Thonet, Amerika je pravý úhel (2012)
- Mare (2013)
- Sestra duše (2015)
- Bizom aneb Služba a mise (2016)
- Světový orloj (2017)
- Kostel pro kuřáky/A Church for Smokers (2019)
- Elza a muchomůrka (2022)
- Jiný život. Wittgenstein (2023)
- O Jamce a Krmce (2024)
- Broumovské zajetí (2025)
- Jak se půlí vesmír. Hanácké a sudetské povídky (2025)
- Pupek světa a slinivka břišní. Pražské povídky (2025)

=== Critical Studies ===
- Původ poezie (2006), ed. Sylva Fischerová and Jiří Starý
- Mýtus a geografie (2008) ed. Sylva Fischerová and Jiří Starý
- Hippokratés. Vybrané spisy I (2012) ed. Hynek Bartoš and Sylva Fischerová
- Medicína mezi jedinečným a univerzálním (2012), ed. Aleš Beran and Sylva Fischerová
- Starodávné bejlí. Obrysy populární a brakové literatury ve starověku a středověku (2016), ed. Sylva Fischerová and Jiří Starý
- Hippokratés. Vybrané spisy II (2018) ed. Hynek Bartoš and Sylva Fischerová
- Ancient Weeds. Contours of Popular and Trash Literature in Ancient and Medieval Times (2024), ed. Sylva Fischerová and Jiří Starý

=== Interviews ===
- Floss, Karel, Fischerová, Sylva: Bůh vždycky zatřese stavbou, Vyšehrad Prague, 2011, ISBN 978-80-7429-136-4

=== Editorial Work ===
- Dryák ředěný Vltavou: pražská říční antologie / A Giant barrel of Rutgut: Prague River Anthology, ed. Sylva Fischerová and Petr A. Bílek (bilingual edition), Prague, Městská knihovna 2016
- Together with Jan Šulc, she is a co-editor of the selected works of her father Josef Ludvík Fischer: J. L. Fischer, Výbor z díla I–III (2007–2013).
- The fourth volume, containing Fischer’s work written in English, German, French, Dutch or translated into Italian, English and German is forthcoming (Selected Works IV, Vydavatelství Univerzity Palackého Olomouc)

=== Translations to Czech ===
- Pindaros, Pýthijské zpěvy (2021), with Robert Roreitner

=== Works in Translation ===
- The Tremor of Racehorses: Selected Poems (UK, Bloodaxe Books, 1990)
- Att leva: Dikter om frihet (with Denise Levertov and Frances Horowitz; Sweden, Studiekamratens, 1994)
- Cud (Poland, ATUT, 2008)
- The Swing in the Middle of Chaos (UK, Bloodaxe Books, 2010)
- Dood, waar is je wapen? (The Netherlands, Voetnoot, 2011)
- Stomach of the Soul (USA, Calypso Editions, 2014)
- Europa ein Thonet Stuhl, Amerika ein rechter Winkel: Ein poetischer Roadtrip durch die Neue Welt (Germany, Balaena 2018)
- Die Weltuhr. Gedichte (Germany, Klak Verlag 2019)
- Kostel pro kuřáky/A Church for Smokers (bilingual edition, Prague, Novela Bohemica 2019)
- "Two Poems" ["The World Clock and the Animated Machine: Olomouc", "Old and New England"], Modern Poetry in Translation 2:2020. ISBN 978-1-910485-27-9
- Europa jest jak Krzesło Thoneta Ameryka to kąt prosty (Poland, Amaltea 2021)
- Kruvinas kelis (Lithuania, Bazilisko ambasada 2022)
- Wittgenstein (A poem). Published online, Plume Poetry, May, 2026
