= Viola Fischerová =

- Born: October 18, 1935; Brno
- Died: November 4, 2010 (aged 75); Prague
- Occupation: poet

Viola Fischerová (October 18, 1935 Brno – November 4, 2010 Prague) was a Czech poet, and translator.

== Life ==
Her father was Josef Ludvík Fischer; her half sister is Sylva Fischerová.

She studied Slavic studies at universities in Brno and Prague. She was a friend of Václav Havel.

In the 1960s, she worked as the literary editor of Czechoslovak Radio. In 1968, she went into exile with her future husband Karel Michal to Switzerland, where she studied German and history at the University of Basel and worked as a teacher. After the death of her husband in 1984, she went to Germany and worked with Radio Free Europe. She remarried, to Josef Jedlička, and lived in Prague.

Her first collection of poetry could not come out in 1957, thus her official poetic debut was in 1993, with the collection of poems Requiem for Pavel Buksa.

== Awards ==
She won the 2006 Dresden Lyric Prize for her book Nyní in German translation; the 2006 Czech Children's Book of the Year for Co vyprávěla dlouhá chvíle; and the 2010 Czech Poetry Book of the Year, for Domek na vinici.

== Works ==
- Zádušní básně za Pavla Buksu (Requiem for Pavel Buksa), Petrov, 1993
- Babí hodina (Old Women’s Hour), Nakladatelství Franze Kafky, 1995
- Jak pápěří (Like a Feather), Artforum - Jazzová sekce, 1995, ISBN 978-80-85271-18-8
- Odrostlá blízkost (Grown Proximity), Petrov, 1996, ISBN 978-80-85247-78-7
- Divoká dráha domovů (Wild Track of Homes), Torst, 1998, ISBN 978-80-7215-068-7
- Matečná samota (Mother Solitude), Petrov, 2002, ISBN 978-80-7227-124-5
- Nyní: Praha-Elba-Praha 2002-2003 (Now), Petrov, 2004, ISBN 978-80-7227-185-6
- Co vyprávěla dlouhá chvíle (What the Boredom Told), Meander, 2005, ISBN 978-80-86283-37-1
- Předkonec (Preliminary Ending), Agite/Fra, 2007, ISBN 978-80-86603-46-9
- Písečné dítě (Sand Child), Agite/Fra, 2007, ISBN 978-80-86603-59-9
- Domek na vinici (A Little House at the Vineyard), Agite/Fra, 2009, ISBN 978-80-86603-88-9
