= Lucie Doležalová =

Czech medievalist (born 1977)

- Born: 3 July 1977 (age 49); Brno, Czechoslovakia
- Occupation: Professor
- Awards: Bedřich Hrozný Prize (2022), Magnesia Litera (2022)

Academic background
- Education: Palacký University Olomouc, Central European University
- Doctoral advisor: Gerhard Jaritz

Academic work
- Discipline: Medieval studies
- Institutions: Charles University

Lucie Doležalová (born 3 July 1977) is a Czech medievalist, philologist, literary scholar and translator. She specializes in Latin literature and manuscript culture of the late Middle Ages, particularly the manuscripts by the Czech scribe Crux of Telč (1434–1504), mnemonics (the art of memory), colophons, and obscure texts.

== Life ==
Lucie Doležalová studied at Palacký University in Olomouc and Central European University in Budapest, where she defended her dissertation in 2005 on the late antique text Cena Cypriani. She worked as a research fellow at the University of Zurich and conducted study and research visits at universities in Europe and the United States. Since 2008, she has been teaching at the Institute of Greek and Latin Studies at the Faculty of Arts and the Faculty of Humanities at Charles University in Prague. She is a member of the scientific council of the Centre for Medieval Studies.

In 2012, she obtained her habilitation, and at the end of 2021, she was appointed professor in the field of Greek and Latin studies. In April 2022, she and her colleagues were awarded the Bedřich Hrozný Prize for their project "Creative Copying", which resulted in a monography on the scribe Crux of Telč and an extensive catalogue of medieval libraries of Augustinian canons in Třeboň and Borovany. In the same month, she received the Magnesia Litera 2022 award in the category of publishing achievement for another publication on the Lipnice Bible that she prepared with her team. In 2024, she received a prestigious ERC CZ grant for her project "Innovation and Inertia: The End of Medieval Scribes." In this project, she and her colleagues are examining the period of the decline of manuscript culture and the advent of book printing, in which she finds many parallels to the current development of digital culture. Doležalová also participated in a research project devoted to popular and trash literature in antiquity and the Middle Ages, which culminated in the publication of the Czech and English monographs Starodávné bejlí and Ancient Weeds.

== Books ==
Doležalová has written or edited the following books:

- Reception and its varieties: Reading, re-writing, and understanding Cena Cypriani in the Middle Ages. Trier: Wissenschaftlicher Verlag. 2007. ISBN 9783884769171.
- Obscurity and Memory in Late Medieval Latin Manuscript Culture: The Case of the Summarium Biblie. Krems: Medium Aevum Quotidianum. 2012. ISBN 9783901094316.
- Ubi est finis huius libri deus scit: Středověká knihovna augustiniánských kanovníků v Roudnici nad Labem. Scriptorium. 2015. ISBN 978-80-88013-09-9. (with Michal Dragoun and Adéla Ebersonová)
- The art of memory in late medieval Central Europe (Czech lands, Hungary, Poland). Paris: LʼHarmattan. 2016. ISBN 978-2-343-08252-3. (with Farkas Gábor Kiss and Rafał Wójcik)
- Čítanka latinských textů z pozdně středověkých Čech. Scriptorium. 2017. ISBN 978-80-88013-50-1. (editor, with Michal Dragoun and Jan Ctibor)
- Kříž z Telče (1434-1504): Písař, sběratel a autor. Scriptorium. 2020. ISBN 978-80-88013-98-3. (editor, with Michal Dragoun)
- Passionate Copying in Late Medieval Bohemia: The Case of Crux de Telcz (1434-1504). Praha: Karolinum. 2021. ISBN 9788024646657. (with Michal Dragoun and Kimberly Rivers)
- Lipnická bible: Štít víry v neklidných časech pozdního středověku. Okrouhlice: Spolek Za záchranu rodného domu Jana Zrzavého v Okrouhlici. 2021. ISBN 978-80-908223-0-6. (editor, with Karel Pacovský)
- Středověké knihovny augustiniánských kanonií v Třeboni a Borovanech. Scriptorium. 2021. ISBN 978-80-7649-026-0. (with Michal Dragoun and Adéla Ebersonová)
- Latin Literatures of Medieval and Early Modern Times in Europe and Beyond. A Millenium Heritage. Comparative History of Literatures in European Languages 34. Amsterdam: John Benjamins. 2024. ISBN 978-90-272-1447-8. (co-editor, with editor Francesco Stella and co-editor Danuta Shanzer)
