= Herma Svozilová-Johnová =

Herma Svozilová-Johnová (29 August 1914 – 5 April 2009) was a Czechoslovak writer.

The daughter of an attorney, she was born Herma Svozilová in Prostějov and attended grammar school there. Her paternal grandfather was Josef Svozil. She continued her studies at the lyceum in Saint-Germain-en-Laye and at the French grammar school in Prague. She went on to study journalism at the Svobodná škola politických nauk and also studied at Oxford. After her marriage to Oldřich John who served as mayor of Prostějov from 1937 to 1939, she returned to Prostějov. There, she was cultural editor for Hlasu lidu. In 1948, the couple moved to Prague.

Her work first appeared in the journal Našinec in 1929. After that her prose and poems appeared in various periodicals including Hlas lidu, Lidové noviny, Hanácký kalendář, Noviny Jablonecka and Literární noviny. Her novels Kdo byl Kyrat? (1972) and Vysoké napětí (1974) were adapted into plays for radio.
