= Josef Ludvík Fischer =

Czech philosopher and sociologist (1894–1973)

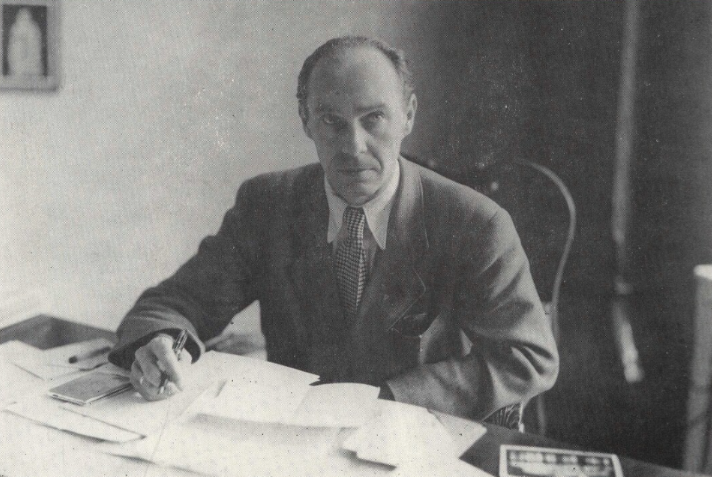
- Fischer, c. 1940
- Born: 6 November 1894; Prague, Austria-Hungary
- Died: 17 February 1973 (aged 78); Olomouc, Czechoslovakia
- Education: Charles University
- Occupations: philosopher, professor, translator, university president, literary critic, sociologist, literary publicist
- Children: 4
- Writing career
- Notable awards: Order of Tomáš Garrigue Masaryk

Josef Ludvík Fischer (6 November 1894 – 17 February 1973) was a Czech philosopher and sociologist, and an exponent of philosophical structuralism.

== Life ==
Fischer was born on 6 November 1894 in Prague. After studies at upper secondary schools in České Budějovice and Třeboň (he graduated in 1912) he graduated from the Faculty of Arts, Charles University, majoring in Czech, German, and philosophy. He received his doctorate in 1919 (PhD. dissertation: Arthur Schopenhauer. Genese díla – Arthur Schopenhauer. Genesis of his works). From 1921 to 1923, he worked at the Public and University Library in Prague (now the National Library of the Czech Republic) and was actively involved in the left-wing movement. He contributed articles to Stanislav Kostka Neumann's Června, Bedřich Václavek's Studentské revue, and worked with Zdeněk Nejedlý on the magazine Var. Due to his left-wing activities and political involvement, he was transferred away from Prague to the Research Library in Olomouc, where he was employed until 1933. From 1924 to 1930, he was a member of the Communist Party of Czechoslovakia; however, he de facto ended his activities in this party in 1925 due to his disagreement with Gottwald's policy, which followed the directive procedures of the Soviet Communist Party.

In 1927, with his habilitation work Saint-Simon and Auguste Comte, Masaryk University in Brno awarded him the title Docent in Sociology, and in 1930 Docent in the History of Philosophy. At the turn of the 1920s and 1930s, together with Bedřich Václavek and Jiří Mahen, he edited the magazine Index (1929–1939), and with Inocenc Arnošt Bláha and Emanuel Chalupný, he founded and edited the Sociologická revue (1930–1940, 1945–1948). From 1933 to 1935, he worked for the university library in Brno, and became an associate professor of sociology and the history of philosophy at Masaryk University in 1935. In Brno, he took part in the Left Front and in 1938 he became the head of the Brno office of the Společnost přátel demokratického Španělska (Society of Friends of Democratic Spain).

After the Nazi Occupation of Czechoslovakia, he fled to the Netherlands, where he remained in hiding until after the war.. After his return to Brno, he was appointed full professor at the Masaryk University Faculty of Arts in October 1945, and served as the faculty's dean in the 1945/46 school year. At the same time, he took part in the reinstatement of Palacký University Olomouc, and was encharged by Minister of Education Zdeněk Nejedlý to be its rector from 1946 to 1949 (In the Palacký University Faculty of Arts course catalogue from 1949 to 1951, he is listed as Vice-Rector). In February 1948, he demonstratively rejoined the Communist Party of Czechoslovakia and became a functionary in the regional action committee. In a proclamation by the Rector of Palacký University from March 1948, addressed to the academic community and the general public of the Olomouc region, Fischer nevertheless states that the condition for his cooperation with the new order is the preservation of democracy and, above all, absolute freedom of research.

At the close of 1948 he resigned from political functions, and in 1954 he wrote and sent a memorandum to the highest party and state authorities in which he criticised educational reform (including a protest against the closing of the Palacký University Faculty of Arts and its transformation into the Faculty of Social Sciences of the newly established Higher School of Education). In 1955, he returned his Communist Party of Czechoslovakia membership card, thereby ending his membership in the party. Because no suitable position was found for Fischer at Palacký University, he was transferred to Masaryk University in Brno in 1957, where he became a professor in the Philosophy Department (as of 1 March 1957). However, he was soon forced into mandatory retirement on 1 January 1960.

When more liberal conditions prevailed in the second half of the 1960s, Fischer took advantage of this to publish in professional journals, and in 1965 he briefly worked at the Department of Psychology in the reinstated Palacký University Faculty of Arts. His work Sokrates nelegendární (literally, "Socrates the Unlegendary", 1965; English title: The Case of Socrates) was also published by Palacký University. In 1967, he became a research fellow at the Faculty of Education and Journalism of Charles University, and the following year he was called back to Palacký University Olomouc as a professor of philosophy and sociology. However, during the Normalization period, he was retired (1970), and the second edition of Sokrates nelegendární, as well as the second edition of Krize demokracie, prepared for publication in 1970, were not published due to political reasons.

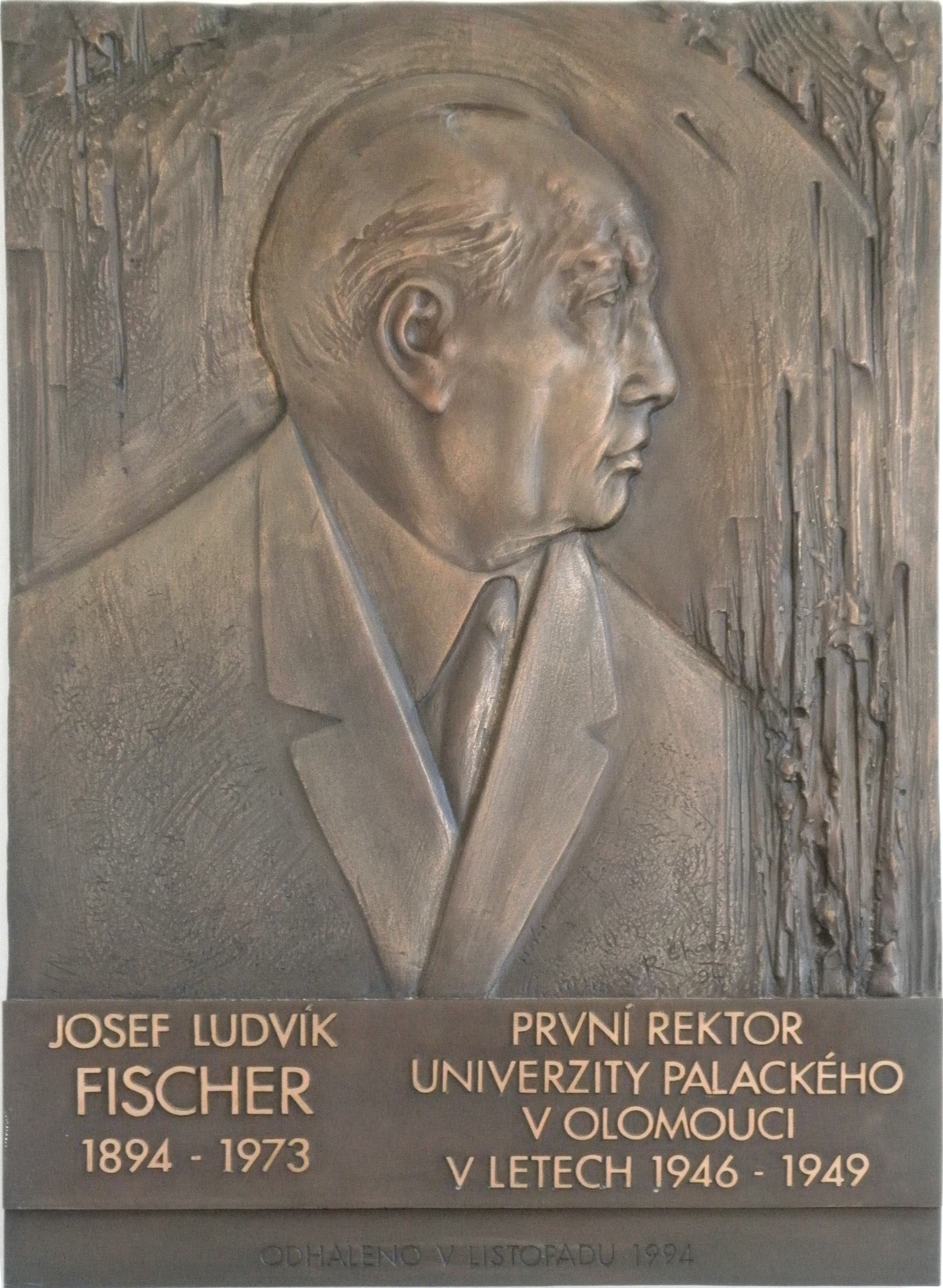
Josef Ludvík Fischer memorial plaque, located since 1994 at the Palacký University Olomouc Rector's Office

=== Death ===
Fischer died on 17 February 1973 in Olomouc. Death came to Fischer when he was still working at top capacity. In accordance with his conviction of the permanent incompleteness of our knowledge, he continued to rethink his categorical system. He was buried in the Central Cemetery in Olomouc-Neředín.

In 1992, Fischer was awarded the Order of Tomáš Garrigue Masaryk, 4th class, in memoriam. Since 1994, a bronze memorial plaque with a relief of J. L. Fischer has been placed in the vestibule of the Palacký University Rector's Office. The Společnost Josefa Ludvíka Fischera (Josef Ludvík Fischer Society) was founded in Olomouc, a publisher which also runs the annual J. L. Fischer Memorial Lecture.

=== Family ===
Fischer was twice married. In 1925, he married Aloisia, née Konrádová, a teacher prior to their marriage, and had two children with her, Jiří (b. 1925) and Viola (b. 1935). After his divorce, he married a second time in 1961 to his former pupil, thirty-two years his junior, Jarmila Kantorková. This marriage produced two daughters, Soňa (born 1961) and Sylva (born 1963).

His daughter Viola was a significant poet and translator; his daughter Sylva Fischerová is also a significant poet, writer, and university teacher.

== Membership in learned societies and professional organizations ==
- Czech
  - Royal Bohemian Society of Sciences
  - Československá národní rada badatelská (Czechoslovak National Research Council)
  - Česká akademie věd a umění (Czech Academy of Sciences and Art)
  - Jednota filozofická (Philosophy Union)
  - Sociologická společnost (Sociology Society)
  - Svaz československých spisovatelů (Czechoslovak Writers' Union)
- International
  - Delta Tau Kappa, Bridgeport CT, USA
  - G. W. Leibnitz-Gesellschaft, Hanover
  - House of World Cultures, Berlin
  - Accademia Teatina per le Scienze
  - Centro Superiore di Logica e Scienze Comparate

== Philosophy ==
His critical alignment with the philosophy of positivism and pragmatism led Fischer to develop his own philosophical system, which he called "integrative philosophy" ("skladebná filosofie"). It was intended to build on the structural methods of individual sciences which prefer the whole rather than the individual parts. The concept of the whole is one which Fischer defined in his Základy poznání (Foundations of Knowledge, 1931) through the help of the concept of function, and thus created an original system of functional structuralism, which he applied to his analysis of the societal reality in Krize demokracie (Crisis of Democracy, 1933). For Fischer, the crisis of democracy was part of a more general cultural crisis, which he associated with a quantitative and mechanistic conception of reality. He schematized structural similarities between individual cultural elements (e.g. between science, economics, and politics) via the concept of the cultural prototype. Thus he anticipated several subsequent cultural-sociological problems (cf. Foucault's concept of the épistémè). He saw a way out of the crisis in the ontological rehabilitation of quality, which he returned to elaborate, along with other categories of function and structure, in his collection Filosofické studie (Philosophical Studies, 1968).

== In popular culture ==
Zdeněk Vašíček recalled: "Ludvík Svoboda [President of Czechoslovakia 1968–1975] (...) in his memoirs [Cestami života, Vol 1, 1971] declares his deep interest in JLF in the 1930s and devotes a good twenty pages to the contents of his book ‘Krize demokracie’ [Crisis of Democracy]. The good president likely had never even heard of JLF. It was me who acquainted one of the ghostwriters of his memoir, Oldřich Janeček, with the works of JLF. He decided to spread JLF's philosophy by all means possible, including the president's memoirs. So it's no wonder that the late president's memoirs were soon taken off the sales shelves."

Every November, Palacký University Olomouc holds the J. L. Fischer Memorial Lecture. The first took place in 1994 on the hundredth anniversary of the birth of the school's first rector after it was reinstated. The lecturer is chosen by a committee of Czech and international experts.

== Publications ==
- Arthur Schopenhauer. Genese díla (Příspěvek k psychologii tvorby) (1921)
- O vědomí (1922)
- Hovory a zpovědi. Dvě knihy neklidu a hledání. Kniha první (1922)
- Filosofie, její podstata a problémy (1922)
- Saint Simon a Auguste Comte. Příspěvek k dějinám sociologického racionalismu (1925)
- Glosy k české otázce (1926)
- O pravdách a filosofech (1926)
- Útěk před starou filosofií (1927)
- Budoucnost evropské kultury. Vstupní čtení na Masarykově univerzitě 17. 10. 1927 (1928)
- Über die Zukunft der europäischen Kultur (1929)
- Kultura a regionalismus (1929)
- O neklidu dneška (1930)
- Základy poznání. Soustava skladebné filosofie na podkladě zkušenosti I (1931)
- Třetí říše. Úvodem do současného politického stavu (1932)
- Tyrš a sokolstvo. Historický a kritický rozbor sokolské ideologie (1932)
- Zrcadlo doby. Abeceda skoro filosofická (1932)
- Řád kapitalistický a skladebný (1933)
- Krize demokracie. I. Svoboda, II. Řád (1933)
- Věčný a časový úkol filosofie (1935)
- Národní tradice a česká filosofie. Úkoly a výzvy (1939)
- Den po válce (1946)
- Na cestu. Hrst proslovů děkanových (1946)
- Politika a stranictví (1947)
- Únor 1948. Slovo k vychovatelům (1948)
- Tři stupně. Filosofický vějíř (1948)
- Meze kvantitativní metody (SPFFBU, B 5, 1958)
- Uvedení do vědy (1961)
- Struktura pracujících ve strojírenství (1965, spolu se Zdeňkem Zajíčkem)
- Sokrates nelegendární (1965)
- O kategoriích (Filosofický časopis, 1966, 1967)
- Kvalitativní kosmos; Řád struktur (Filozofia, 1967)
- Pedagogické stati (1968)
- Dějiny filosofie. Řecká filosofie (1968)
- Filosofické studie (1968)
- Proti Mnichovu (1968)
- The Case of Socrates (Rozpravy ČSAV. 79/1969, 8 vol.) [English publication of the book Sokrates nelegendární.]
- Skladebná filosofe, strukturalismus a dialektika (Filosofický časopis, 1969)
- Nástin teorie politiky (Sociologický časopis, 1969)
- Glosy k české otázce. 1st ed. Prague: Horizont, 1970. 185 p.
- La crisi della democrazia. Rischi mortali e alternative possibili. Introduzione e traduzione Sergio Corduas. Einaudi Paperbacks 85, Giulio Einaudi, Torino 1977.
- Listy o druhých a o sobě (2005)

=== Translations ===
- SCHOPENHAUER, Arthur . Genius; Umění; Láska; Světec. Vybral, přeložil a doslovem opatřil J. L. Fischer. Prague: Symposion, 1923. 150 pgs. Symposion; Vol. 10.
  - reprinted: SCHOPENHAUER, Arthur and FISCHER, Josef Ludvík, ed. Génius, umění, láska, světec. Trans. Josef Ludvík Fischer. Olomouc: Votobia, 1994. 175 pgs. ISBN 80-85619-08-3.

=== Selected works ===
- Výbor z díla I (2007)
- Výbor z díla II (2009)
- Výbor z díla III (2013)
- The fourth volume, containing Fischer's work in English, German, French, Dutch or translated into Italian, English and German is forthcoming (Selected Works IV, Vydavatelství Univerzity Palackého Olomouc)

== Bibliography ==
- FISCHER, Josef Ludvík, Listy o druhých a o sobě, Praha: Torst 2005.
- FISCHER, Josef Ludvík and DVOŘÁK, Jaromír, eds. Index 1929–1939. Olomouc: Palacký University, 1964. 53, [1] p. [Contains a bibliography of works by J. L. Fischer.]
- FISCHER, Josef Ludvík. Osobnost, dílo, myšlenky. Olomouc: Univerzita Palackého, 1990.
- FORST, Vladimír a kol. Lexikon české literatury: osobnosti, díla, instituce. Vol. 1 (A–G). 1st edition. Prague: Academia, nakladatelství Československé akademie věd, 1985, 900 p. [Entry "Josef Ludvík Fischer", p. 708–709.]
- GABRIEL, Jiří. Za profesorem J. L. Fischerem. In: Sborník prací Filozofické fakulty brněnské univerzity, B 20, 1973, p. 125–128.
- GABRIEL, Jiří. Poválečná brněnská léta J. L. Fischera. In: Sborník prací Filozofické fakulty brněnské univerzity, B 47, 2000, p. 25–33.
- GABRIEL, Jiří. J. L. Fischer v letech 1945–1948. 1. část. In: Studia philosophica, 59, 2012, no. 1, p. 71–85.
- GABRIEL, Jiří. J. L. Fischer v letech 1945–1948. 2. část. In: Studia philosophica, 59, 2012, no. 2, p. 63–80.
- GABRIEL, Jiří, ed. Hledání řádu skutečnosti: sborník ke 100. výročí narození Josefa Ludvíka Fischera. Brno: Masarykova univerzita v Brně, Filozofická fakulta, 1994.
- Česká filozofie ve 20. století. I. Směry, osobnosti, problémy. Masarykova univerzita.
- GABRIEL, Jiří (ed.) Slovník českých filozofů. Brno: Masarykova universita, 1998. 697 p. ISBN 80-210-1840-2 [Entry "Josef Ludvík Fischer", p. 127–129.]
- Literární život ve stínu Mnichova (1938-1939). Academia. ISBN 978-80-200-1823-6.
- Český biografický slovník XX. století I. A-J. Paseka. ISBN 80-7185-245-7.
- MUSIL, Jiří V., ed. Josef Ludvík Fischer 6.11.1894 - 17.2.1973. Olomouc: Vlastivědná společnost v Olomouci 2001.
- ZUMR, Josef. Josef Ludvík Fischer – občan a filosof. In: Fischer, Josef Ludvík. Případ Sokrates. 2nd ed. Prague: NLN, Nakladatelství Lidové noviny, 1994. 170 p. ISBN 80-7106-110-7. [Cf p. 165–170.]
