= Ancient Weeds =

2016 Czech book of literary criticism

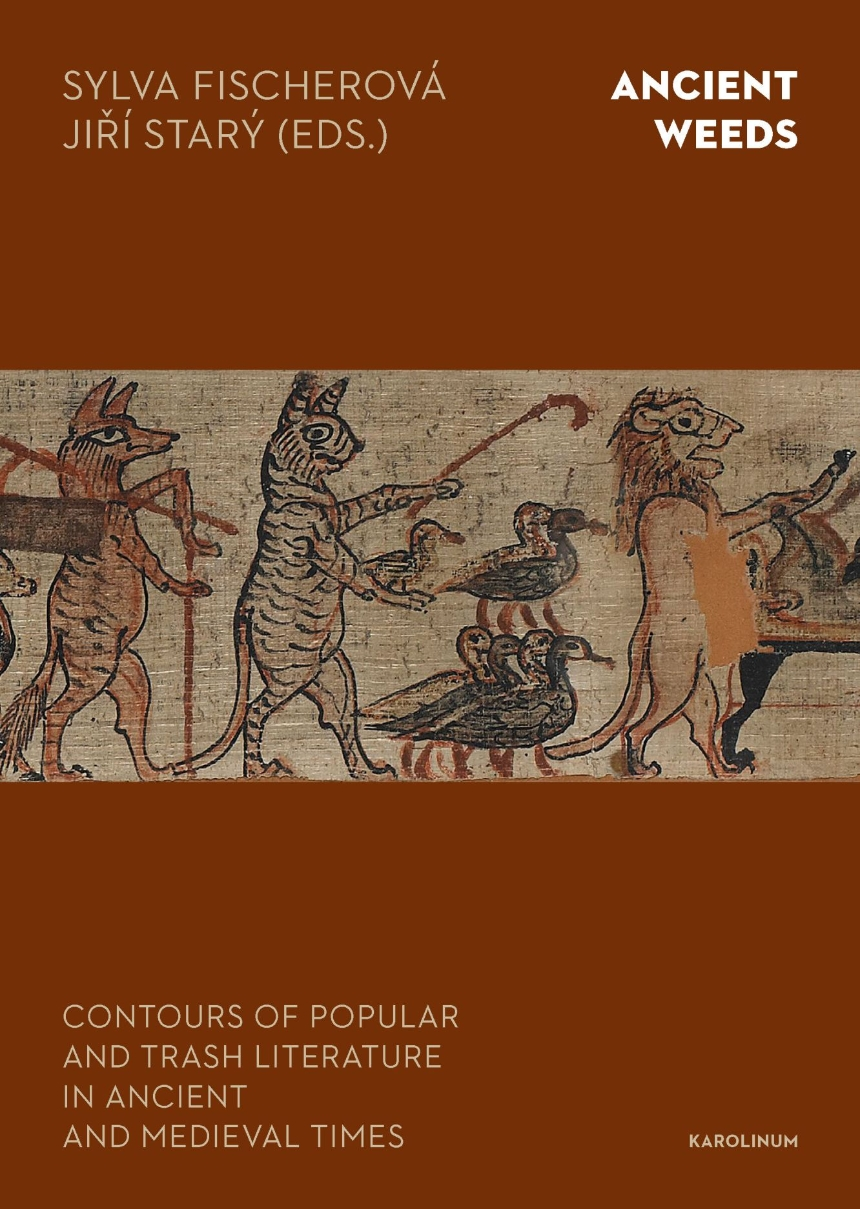
- Editors: Sylva Fischerová, Jiří Starý
- Authors: Sylva Fischerová, Jiří Janák, Renata Landgráfová, Iva Adámková, Slavica Ranković, Kristina Králová, Jiří Starý, Martin Bažil, Matouš Jaluška, Lucie Doležalová, Juan Sánchez
- Language: English
- Publisher: Karolinum Press (Czech Republic) Distributed by University of Chicago Press (US)
- Publication date: 2024
- Media type: Print (paperback), ebook
- ISBN: 978-80-246-5472-0 (paperback)
- Website: https://obalky.kosmas.cz/ArticleFiles/549392/auto_preview1.pdf/FILE/ancient-weeds_auto_preview1.pdf

Ancient Weeds: Contours of Popular and Trash Literature in Ancient and Medieval Times (originally published in Czech as Starodávné bejlí. Obrysy populární a brakové literatury ve starověku a středověku) is a 2016 non-fiction book edited by Sylva Fischerová and Jiří Starý, published in English in 2024. It addresses the origins and development of popular literature and popular culture, asserting the existence and value of lowbrow literature in the ancient and medieval periods and thus seeks to rewrite standard literary handbooks.

== Synopsis ==
The authors reject the premise that that the emergence of popular and trash literature is related to the emergence of modern society due to the rise of literacy and the shortening of workdays. Instead, they aim to demonstrate that antiquity had its fair share of literary pieces that fit the definition of popular, trivial, and junk or trash literature. The authors analyze artifacts such as the ancient Egyptian Turin Papyrus, the story of Sinuhe, ancient Greek novels, Christian hagiographies and passion plays, medieval lives of Jesus and Marian hymns, Old Norse tales and lying sagas, and Spanish blind romances. These studies are interconnected through cross-references. Supporting their arguments with numerous excerpts from the primary texts under scrutiny, the authors argue that the line between lowbrow and highbrow is thinner than it seems, and that seemingly low themes such as sex and violence often overlap with the themes of high literature. They further argue that in many cases low literature is more imaginative and subversive than canonical texts, and bizarreness and non-conformity do not necessarily equate to the ephemerality of a work. In addition to its scholarly value, the book also demonstrates, that even thousands of years after its creation, low literature can still be a great source of entertainment.

=== Chapters ===
The book's table of contents is as follows:

- Sylva Fischerová: Ancient and Modern Weeds: an Attempt at a Definition
- Jiří Janák, Renata Landgráfová: Popular Literature and Pulp Fiction in Ancient Egypt
- Sylva Fischerová: The Ancient Love Novel: Formula and Its Innovation
- Iva Adámková: Early Christian Martyrologic Texts: Between Topoi and Entertaining Reading
- Slavica Ranković: The Paradox of High Popular Art and Formulaic Creativity in the Sagas of Icelanders
- Kristina Králová: Coal-Biters and Their Journey Out: Popular Features of Old Norse Short Narratives
- Jiří Starý: The Author, Schema and Originality: the Case of Old Norse Lying Sagas
- Martin Bažil: Formula Theatralis: Formulaic Elements and Structures in Central European Medieval Religious Drama
- Matouš Jaluška: The Highest Lady and the Cycle of Praise: Alfonso X’s Attempt to Create Literature “for the People”
- Lucie Doležalová: A “Not Very Specific Term”: Late Medieval Popular Literature
- Juan Sánchez: Romances of the Blind as Pulp Fiction

== Publication history ==
The book was first published in Czech in 2016 by Charles University, under the title Starodávné bejlí. Obrysy populární a brakové literatury ve starověku a středověku. The editors gave a number of interviews at the time, including a radio broadcast. A revised and updated English version was published by Karolinum Press in 2024.

== Views on the origins of popular literature ==
The perspective on the origins and development of popular literature and culture which Ancient Weeds proposes is not entirely new. The common narrative in literary studies regarding the birth of popular literature and popular culture is that these phenomena are products of modern society in connection with the rise of literacy rates and the shortening of work days. However, attempts have been made (such as that of V. E. Neuburg) to push the date of popular literature's inception as far back as to the period following the invention of the printing press.

Another approach subsumes popular literature under the umbrella of popular culture, which results in a scenario wholly chronologically different from the usual timeline. This approach is well illustrated by a story told by scholar Fred Schroeder about his "discovery" of ancient popular culture at the Chicago Museum of Natural History via ushabti figurines from ancient Egypt.

A further challenge to the "common narrative" is found in Nicola McDonald's 2004 monograph, Pulp fictions of medieval England: Essays in popular romance. She argues that it is possible to speak of medieval (or more broadly ancient) pulp, as there are clear and sometimes surprising parallels in the style, subject matter, tenor, and reception of Middle English verse romance and modern pulp fiction. She points out that Middle English romance, which was the principal literature of secular entertainment in England c.1250-c.1500, has a sensationalist taste for sex and violence, often content to reproduce the easy certainties of sexist, racist, and other bigoted ideologies. In other words, it exhibits many traits now associated with pulp or trash literature.

== Reception ==
Jan Lukavec reviewed the book for iLiteratura.cz, in a review entitled "Cannibal priestesses and toilet demons. About ancient texts bluntly and with gusto." It was also reviewed by Jakub Kozák in Studia mediaevalia Bohemica.
