= Jenišovice (Chrudim District) =

- Municipality
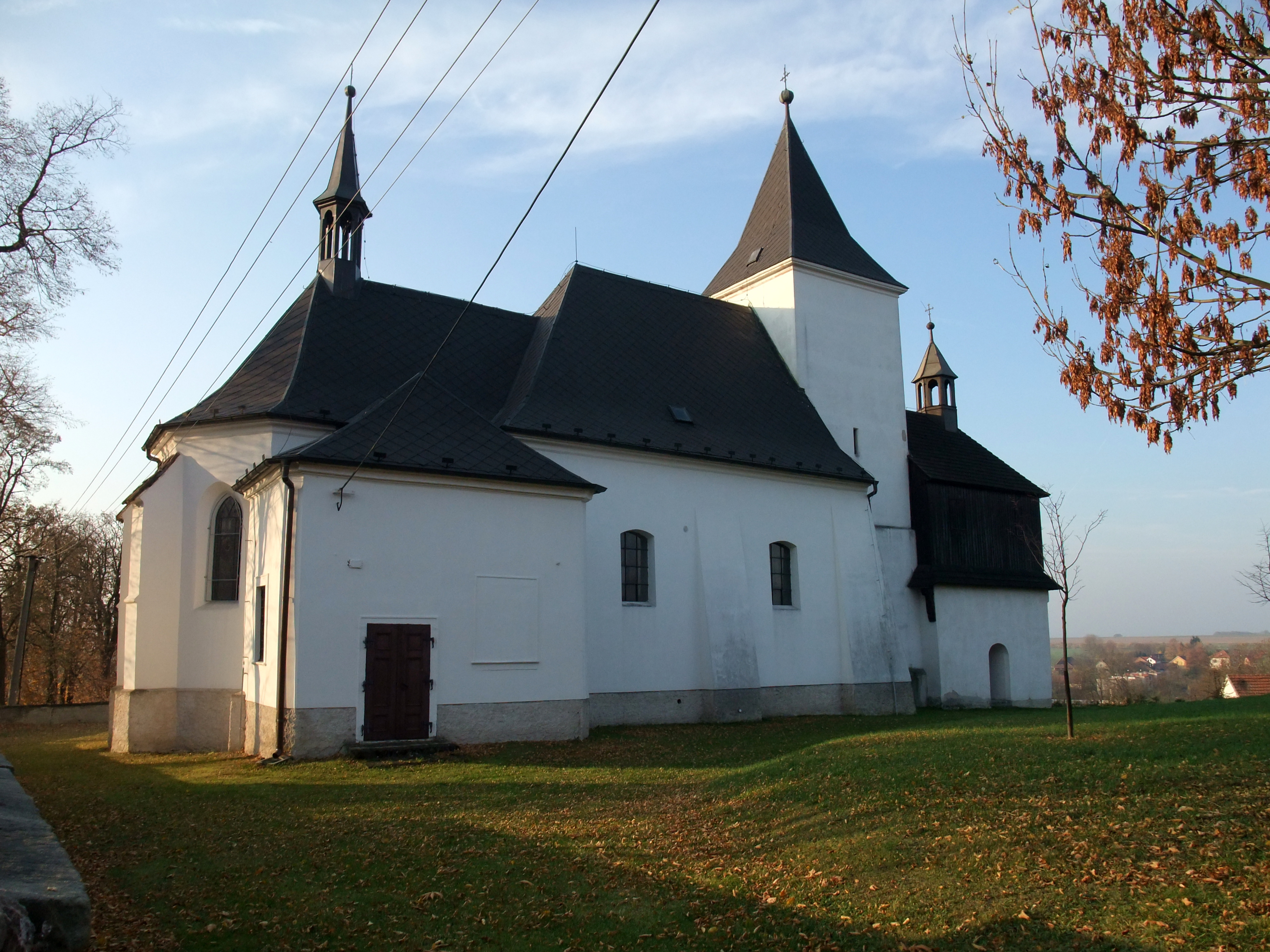
- Church of the Holy Trinity

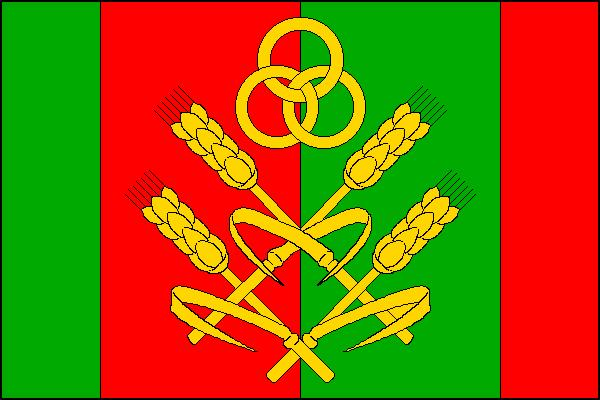
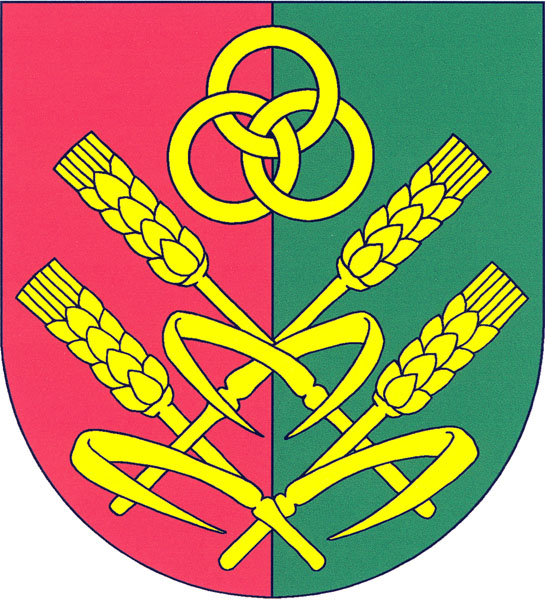
- Flag Coat of arms

- Location in the Czech Republic
- Coordinates: 49°55′47″N 16°1′52″E
- Country: Czech Republic
- Region: Pardubice
- District: Chrudim
- First mentioned: 1088

Area
  - Total: 11.72 km^{2} (4.53 sq mi)
- Elevation: 237 m (778 ft)

Population (2026-01-01)
  - Total: 431
  - Density: 36.8/km^{2} (95.2/sq mi)
- Time zone: UTC+1 (CET)
  - Summer (DST): UTC+2 (CEST)
- Postal codes: 538 54, 538 63, 538 64
- Website: obecjenisovice.cz

Jenišovice is a municipality and village in Chrudim District in the Pardubice Region of the Czech Republic. It has about 400 inhabitants.

== Administrative division ==
Jenišovice consists of five municipal parts (in brackets population according to the 2021 census):

- Jenišovice (209)
- Martinice (50)
- Mravín (31)
- Štěnec (66)
- Zalažany (66)

== Demographics ==
Historical population
Year	Pop.	±%
1869	922	—
1880	946	+2.6%
1890	960	+1.5%
1900	943	−1.8%
1910	973	+3.2%
1921	997	+2.5%
1930	908	−8.9%
1950	680	−25.1%
1961	629	−7.5%
1970	532	−15.4%
1980	513	−3.6%
1991	481	−6.2%
2001	457	−5.0%
2011	410	−10.3%
2021	422	+2.9%
Source: Censuses

== Notable people ==
- Svatopluk Pitra (1923–1993), graphic designer, illustrator and cartoonist
