= Karel Michal =

Czech writer

Karel Michal (pen name of Pavel Buksa, 28 December 1932 in Prague – 30 June 1984 in Basel, Switzerland) was a Czech writer.

After gymnasium he was not allowed by the regime to study at the university. He worked in several professions and later used this experience in his writings. Later, when the political obstacles were reduced, he started to study medicine at the Charles University in Prague but left it after seven semesters.

In 1960 Michal started to write for literary journal Plamen ("Flame"), in 1961 he published successful collection of short stories. He worked as publish house editor, screen writer, as an editor in literary journal Literární noviny ("Literature News") and then as a professional writer. His novels were translated into foreign languages. Movie Bílá paní ("White Lady") directed by Zdeněk Podskalský was based on one of Michal's short stories.

In 1968, after suppression of Prague Spring, he emigrated to Switzerland. Here he worked as a guard, then as a teacher at a gymnasium. He married Viola Fischerová. Hardness of being separated from his family and the nation contributed to premature death.

== Selected works ==
- 1961: Bubáci pro všední den, collection of short stories, one filmed as Bílá paní in 1965
- 1961: Krok stranou, a detective novel.
- 1966: Čest a sláva, a historical novel, filmed in 1968
- 1967: Gypsová dáma, a novel.
- 1976: Tak to na tom světě chodí, a theatre play.
- 1973: My občané mélští (We, citizens of Melos), a theatre play. A historical parallel between fate of island Melos during the Peloponnesian War and modern Czechoslovakia. Written by order of Swiss TV which however failed to show it for political reasons.
- 1977: Rodný kraj, collection of humorous historic stories, by an exile publishing house.
- Collection of Michal's works was published in 2001, ISBN 80-7106-460-2.

See also the Book Database of the Czech Republic.

== Literature ==
- Milan Jungmann: Literárky - můj osud. Kritické návraty ke kultuře padesátých a šedesátých let s aktuálními reflexemi. (Literární noviny - my fate), 1999, ISBN 80-7108-182-5. History of the journal since 1952 to 1969, when it was closed down. Jugnmann also wrote short biography of Michal for the posthumous collection of works.
