= Crux of Telč =

Crux of Telč (Latin: Crux de Telcz, Czech: Kříž z Telče; 24 December 1434 – 25 March 1504) was a Czech scribe, collector of manuscripts, preacher and Augustinian canon in Třeboň. His extraordinarily extensive scribal activity makes him one of the most prolific scribes of medieval Bohemia and represents an exceptionally valuable source for understanding late medieval book culture and intellectual life in the Czech lands of the 15th century.

== Life ==
Crux was born on 24 December 1434, as he himself recorded in the margin of one of his manuscripts, probably in Telč. The manuscripts he collected are among the most important sources about his life. Particularly valuable are the colophons, which often contain personal information about the scribe. From these notes, we learn that between 1454 and 1458, Crux was as active at schools in Telč, Žďár, Soběslav, Roudnice, and at Vyšehrad in Prague.

In 1459, he studied at Prague University (then Utraquist – though Crux himself was Roman Catholic) in the King Wenceslaus College. However, it is not clear whether he obtained an academic degree there.

According to a colophon dated 1463, he was ordained priest by Hilarius of Litoměřice, the administrator of the Roman Catholic Archdiocese of Prague – the exact date of ordination is unknown. In the 1460s, Crux is documented at Prague Castle as a vicar. Later, Crux was a preacher in Plzeň, Planá, and other towns in central and southern Bohemia.

In 1478, he entered the Augustinian canonry in Třeboň, where he spent the last third of his life as a regular canon and where he died on 25 March 1504, as recorded in the necrology.
