= Josef Jedlička =

Czech writer

Josef Jedlička (16 March 1927 – 5 December 1990) was a Czech writer.

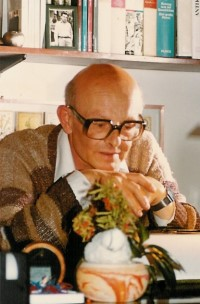
Josef Jedlička in Munich, 1982, photograph of Jan Zabrana in background

Jedlička studied aesthetics and ethnography at Prague University, but after the communist revolution in 1948 he was kicked out of university for being an anticommunist. He then worked in various professions - as laborer, teacher, TV assistant, and tutor among them. After 1953 he moved to Litvínov, an industrial town in northern Bohemia. Being an anticommunist, he was prohibited from publishing anything, but he wrote novels and short stories secretly and read them in circle of his close friends, among them Jan Zábrana, Bohumil Hrabal and other prohibited writers of the time.

In 1966, after 18 years of prohibition, Jedlička was allowed to publish an experimental novel Kde život náš je v půli se svou poutí (Midway Upon the Journey of Our Life), written in the early 1950s; parts of this book were censored in this edition by the communist censors, the complete version would be published in 1994 after the fall of communist regime in Czechoslovakia. Nevertheless the book, with parts censored, caused scandal and was said to be antisocialist and once again Jedlička was prohibited from publishing. Only in 1968, was Jedlička allowed to publish few essays about Kafka and Chaadaev in literature magazines. After the Soviet occupation of Czechoslovakia in August 1968, Jedlička was exiled to West Germany. He eventually lived in Munich, where he worked as editor and commentator for Radio Free Europe during the 1970s and 1980s. He died in Augsburg, Germany, in 1990, where he is buried.

== Work ==
- Kde život náš je v půli se svou poutí (Midway Upon the Journey of Our Life) written c. 1953, published (censored) Prague 1966, complete edition Prague 1994), English edition Nakladatelstvi Karolinum, 2016
- Krev není voda (Blood Is No Water), novel (Prague 1991, German translation DVB 2004)
- České typy (Bohemian Types), essays about Bohemians and their culture, (Prague 1992)
- Rozptýleno v prostoru a čase (Splittered Through Space and Time), (Brno 2000), essays on literature, mainly written for Radio Free Europe, Munich
