= Literární noviny =

Czech monthly newspaper, 1927 to 2020

Literární noviny (lit. Literary newspaper) is a Czech cultural and political monthly newspaper published online. The last print issue was published on May 28, 2020.

== History ==
The first issue was published in 1927. In the 1960s, Literární noviny had a great influence on the gradual liberalization of Czechoslovak society. In the fall of 1967, the leadership of the Communist Party tried to slow down liberalization and stopped publishing Literární noviny. This essentially provoked a clash with the liberal wing of the Central Committee of the Communist Party of the Czech Republic, which was joined by Stalinists dissatisfied with the leadership of Antonín Novotny. Publication of Literární noviny was halted a total of 3 times during the 1960s. By administrative intervention in 1967, by the decision of the editors in connection with the invasion of August 1968, and finally in May 1969. According to the original plan, Literární noviny was to be published from October 1968 as a daily of creative associations, Literární listy as their supplement with a weekly period.

Literární noviny, as a weekly of the Union of Czechoslovak Writers, was published in 1968 under the name Literární listy (February 22, 1968 – August 15, 1968), then as Listy (November 7, 1968 – May 15, 1969). Circulation in June 1968 reached 300,000 copies. Dušan Hamšík was the editor-in-chief from February to May 1968, followed by Milan Jungmann until Listů was stopped. Ludvík Vaculík, Karel Kosík, Jiří Lederer, Milan Kundera, Václav Havel, Helena Klímová, Ivan Klíma, Pavel Kohout, Jan Procházka, Alexandr Kliment, Petr Pithart, Jaroslav Putík, Eduard Goldstücker, Vladimír Karfík, Sergej Machonin, A.J. contributed to them. Liehm, Milan Hübl, Václav Klaus, Vladimír Blažek, Igor Hájek, Antonín Brousek, Petr Chudožilov, Milan Šimečka, Miroslava Rektorisová, Jaroslav Šedivý, Jiří Mucha, Františka Faktorová, Josef Válka, etc. Literary newspapers were one of the important platforms for intellectual discussion in the 1960s, including the period of the Prague Spring. The tradition of Literární noviny was followed by the exiled Listy, a magazine of the Czechoslovak socialist opposition led by Jiří Pelikán, now published in the Czech Republic (www.listy.cz).

== Renewal after 1989 ==
Although the name indicates a literary magazine, the essence of the tradition of Literární noviny consisted rather in the participation of writers and intellectuals in social discussion and in the concept of literature as a living social organism that is closely related to other arts, sciences and politics. The literary newspaper was revived after the Velvet Revolution in November 1989. The first two volumes were published as a supplement to Lidové noviny. They have been published independently since 1992.

During the 1990s, a focus on literature in a more academic sense prevailed. After Jakub Patočka, the co-founder of the DUHA Movement and the editor-in-chief of the socio-ecological magazine Sedmá ženáře Jakub Patočka, became the head of the editorial office, the newspaper expanded to include an ecological-political accent, and the often radical tone of the comments in this field caused numerous controversies. In 2004, in protest against Jakub Patočka's little interest in managing the magazine, eleven editors left his editorial office. However, Jakub Patočka remained as editor-in-chief until the end of 2009.

Since 2001, the Michael Kocáb Foundation for the Support of Literature has been among the patrons of Literární noviny.

After the Society for Literary Newspapers, the Brno Center for Media and Democracy took over publishing of the newspaper in mid-2007. Since February 2009, the publisher has been Právo, solidarita an információs o.s. led by Jan Mládek, which handed over publishing to Litmedia in the same year. The majority owner was Miroslav Pavel, director of Czechoslovak Television in the period 27/11/1989 – 10/1/1990 and former spokesman of the two communist prime ministers Lubomír Štrougal and Ladislav Adamec. The editor-in-chief was Zbyněk Fiala. After the takeover, many editors and other employees left the paper, the predominant reason being the reluctance to cooperate with former communist secret service agents who worked in LN.

In June 2010, Petr Bílek, who previously ran Reflex magazine, became the editor-in-chief. Today Literární noviny mainly deals with political, economic and general social topics. The special supplement to the New Book was abolished. Contributors to the weekly include, for example, Tereza Spencerová, Aleš Bluma, Zbyněk Fiala, Josef Brož or Petr Bílek. In 2017, the Academy of Literary Newspapers was established, which aimed to further educate those interested in contemporary Czech and world literature, the world of media and creative writing in the form of seminars and lectures.

In 2019, LN launched a joint magazine published with Guangming Daily, one of the largest Chinese Communist Party newspapers. At the beginning of 2020, journalists from Aktualně.cz accused LN of "spreading communist propaganda" because they cooperated with Guangming Daily.

=== Economic problems ===
Since January 2014, they have been published as a monthly magazine. In 2016, Literární noviná was not given a subsidy, the owner responded by increasing the price to CZK 59. At the same time, the owner stated that the title has been consistently highly loss-making since the takeover (despite subsidies in previous years). He reported a loss of 5.5 million CZK in 2014, almost 8 million in 2013, 8 million in 2012, a record 11 million in 2011 and 2010, and 5 million in 2009. The accumulated loss from the publication of Literární noviny between 2009 and 2014 amounted to approximately CZK 50 million.

The expert committee of the Department of Art, Literature and Libraries justified the non-granting of the Ministry of Culture subsidy by saying that "Literární noviny is no longer a literary magazine, its name is misleading and in terms of content it cannot be included among the periodicals supported here." The tradition to which the magazine refers in its name has not been fulfilled here for a long time."

Even in November 2018, Literární noviny was still unprofitable, Miroslav Pavel paid for the operation from his own funds. In May 2020, because of this, as well as due to the restrictions resulting from the COVID-19 pandemic, he decided to end the publication of the monthly magazine.
