= List of animated television series of 1997 =

This is a list of animated television series first aired in 1997.

Animated television series first aired in 1997
Title	Seasons	Episodes	Country	Year	Original channel	Technique
101 Dalmatians: The Series	1	65	United States	1997–98	ABC (13 episodes); Syndication (52 episodes)	Traditional
The Adventures of Paddington Bear	3	39	Canada; France	1997–2000	TVOntario; Teletoon; Canal J TF1; ITV	Traditional
The Adventures of Sam & Max: Freelance Police	1	13	United States; Canada	1997–98	Fox Kids; YTV	Traditional
The Angry Beavers	4	62	United States	1997–2003	Nickelodeon	Traditional
Animal Crackers	3	39	Canada; France	1997–2000	Teletoon	Traditional
The Animal Shelf	4	52	United Kingdom	1997–2000	ITV	Stop-Motion; Live action
Bibi Blocksberg	5	60	Germany	1997–2019	ZDF	Traditional
Big Sister, Little Brother	1	26	Sweden; Germany	1997	SVT	Traditional
Blake and Mortimer	1	26	France; Canada	1997–98	Canal+ France 3 M6	Traditional
Caillou (1997)	5	92	Canada	1997–2011	Télétoon/Teletoon (seasons 1–4); Treehouse TV (season 5)	Traditional (seasons 1–3); Flash (seasons 4–5); Live action (season 5)
Captain Red Beard	1	26	France	1997	Canal+	Traditional
Captain Star	2	13	United Kingdom; Canada	1997–98	ITV	Traditional
Cartoon Sushi	1	13	United States; Canada	1997–98	MTV; Teletoon	Traditional/CGI/Stop-Motion/Flash
Channel Umptee-3	1	13	United States	1997–98	Kids' WB	Traditional
Cow and Chicken	4	52	United States	1997–99	Cartoon Network	Traditional
Cute Chocomi	1	13	South Korea	1997	MBC	Traditional
Daria	5	65	United States	1997–2002	MTV	Traditional
Donkey Kong Country	2	40	Canada; France (season 1); China (season 2)	1997–2000	Teletoon; France 2 Canal+	CGI
Dr. Xargle	1	13	Canada; United Kingdom	1997		Traditional
Dunno on the Moon	1	12	Russia	1997–19	RTR	Traditional
Enigma	2	52	France	1997–99	M6	Traditional
Extreme Dinosaurs	1	52	United States	1997	Syndication	Traditional
Extreme Ghostbusters	1	40	United States	1997	Syndication	Traditional
Fennec	1	26	France	1997	France 3	Traditional
Flitze Feuerzahn	1	6	Germany	1997	ZDF	Traditional
Franklin	6	78	Canada; France (seasons 1–2 and 4–6)	1997–2004	Syndication (season 1); Family Channel (seasons 1–5); Treehouse TV and TF1 (season 6)	Traditional
Frankenguy and the Professor		8	United States	1997–2002	Playhouse Disney	Traditional
Freaky Stories	3	35	Canada	1997–99	YTV; Canal Famille	Traditional
Hamos: The Green Chariot	1	26	South Korea	1997–98	KBS2	Traditional
I Am Weasel	5	79	United States	1997–2000	Cartoon Network	Traditional
The Ink and Paint Club		60	United States	1997–98	Disney Channel	Traditional
Ivanhoe: The King's Knight	1	52	Canada, France	1997	France 2	Traditional
Johnny Bravo	4	65	United States	1997–2004	Cartoon Network	Traditional
Les Jules, chienne de vie...	1	27	France	1997	Canal+	Traditional
Kassai and Luk	1	26	France; Canada; South Korea	1997	France 2 Canal J Teletoon	Traditional
King of the Hill	14	269	United States	1997–present	Fox (1999–2009); Syndication (2010); Hulu (2025–present)	Traditional; Toon Boom Harmony (seasons 14–15)
Kipper	6	78	United Kingdom	1997–2000	ITV	Traditional
Kitu and Woofl	1	26	Australia	1997	ABC TV	Stop-Motion
Kleo the Misfit Unicorn	1	26	Canada	1997	Family; Radio-Canada; Treehouse TV; TVO Kids	Traditional
Lava-Lava!	1	14	France	1997–99	Canal+	Traditional
The Legend of Calamity Jane	1	13	France; United States	1997–98	Canal+ Kids' WB	Traditional
Li'l Elvis and the Truckstoppers	1	26	Australia; France	1997–98	ABC Television	Traditional
Little Hippo	1	52	France; Germany; Belgium; United Kingdom	1997–98	La Cinquième; ZDF; RTL-TVI; Playhouse Disney	Traditional
The Little Witches	1	26	France, Spain	1997–99	TF1	Traditional
Loggerheads	1	26	Germany; Ireland; United Kingdom	1997	ProSieben	Traditional
Lupo Alberto	2	104	Italy; France (Season 1)	1997–2002	Rai 1 Rai 2 Rai 3 Rai Gulp	Traditional
Ma petite planète chérie	1	26	France	1997	France 2	Traditional
The Magician	1	39	France	1997–99	France 2/France 3 ProSieben; Fox Kids	Traditional
Men in Black: The Series	4	53	United States	1997–2001	Kids' WB	Traditional
Microscopic Milton	2	26	United Kingdom	1997	CBBC	Traditional
Mouse and Mole	1	19	United Kingdom	1997	CBBC	Traditional
The Mr. Men Show	1	39	Canada; United States	1997–99	Syndication	Traditional; Live action
Mummies Alive!	1	42	Canada; United States	1997	Syndication	Traditional
Nanook's Great Hunt	1	26	Canada; France	1997	TF1	Traditional
Ned's Newt	3	39	Canada; Germany	1997–2000	Teletoon	Traditional
The New Adventures of Zorro	2	26	United States	1997–98	Syndication	Traditional
The New Batman Adventures	1	24	United States	1997–99	Kids' WB	Traditional
The New World of the Gnomes	1	26	Spain	1997	TVE	Traditional
Nightmare Ned	1	12	United States	1997	ABC	Traditional
Noah's Island	3	39	United Kingdom	1997–99	BBC1	Traditional
O Canada		13	Canada	1997–2002	Cartoon Network	Traditional
Patrol 03	1	26	Canada; France; Germany; Luxembourg	1997–98	Teletoon; France 3	Traditional
Pepper Ann	4	65	United States	1997–2001	ABC; UPN (seasons 3–4); Disney Channel (season 4)	Traditional
Pim	2	104	France	1997–98	TF1	Traditional
Pimpa – Le Nuove Avventure	1	26	Italy	1997	Raisat Ragazzi; Rai 3 Rai Yoyo	Traditional
Pippi Longstocking	2	26	Canada; Germany; Sweden	1997–98	Teletoon; ZDF; SVT1	Traditional
Pipsqueak's Planet	1	52	Spain	1997	TV3	Traditional
Plasmo	1	13	Australia	1997	ABC	Stop-Motion
The Prince of Atlantis	1	26	United Kingdom	1997	BBC1; BBC2	Traditional
Princess Sissi	2	52	Canada; France	1997–98	France 3	Traditional
Recess	4	65	United States	1997–2001	ABC (1997–2001); UPN (1999–2001)	Traditional
S.O.S. Bout du Monde	1	26	Canada, France	1997	Canal+	Traditional
Science Court	3	29	United States	1997–2000	ABC	Traditional
The Secret World of Santa Claus	1	26	France; Canada	1997	France 3 Télé-Québec	Traditional
El Siguiente Programa	5	93	Colombia	1997–2019	Canal A Canal 1	Traditional
Simba the King Lion	1	52	Italy	1997	Italia 1	Traditional
Sooty's Amazing Adventures	2	26	United Kingdom	1997–98	ITV	Traditional
Soul Frame Lazenca	1	13	South Korea	1997–98	MBC, Tooniverse	Traditional
Soul Music	1	7	United Kingdom	1997	Channel 4	Traditional
South Park	28	331	United States	1997–present	Comedy Central; Paramount+	Cutout; Flash
Space Goofs	2	52	France	1997–98; 2005–06	France 3	Traditional
Spicy City	1	6	United States	1997	HBO	Traditional
Student Bodies	3	65	Canada; United States	1997–99	YTV; Global; Showcase	Traditional, Live-Action
Tabaluga	3	78	Germany; Australia	1997–2004	ZDF; Seven Network	Traditional
Tam-Tam	1	50	France	1997	Canal+	Traditional
Los Tatitos	2	22	Uruguay	1997–2001	Canal 4	Stop-Motion
Titch	3	39	United Kingdom	1997–2001	ITV; Milkshake!	Stop-Motion
Todd McFarlane's Spawn	3	18	United States	1997–99	HBO	Traditional
Unter Neptun's Flagge	1	31	Germany	1997		Traditional
The Untouchables of Elliot Mouse	1	26	Spain	1997	Antena 3	Traditional
Van-Pires	1	13	United States	1997	Syndication	CGI; Live action
The Wacky World of Tex Avery	1	65	France; United States	1997	M6; Syndication	Traditional
Walter Melon	2	52	France; United States	1997–98	Fox Kids; France 2 Canal+ ITV	Traditional
The Weird Al Show	1	13	United States	1997	CBS	Traditional/CGI/Stop-motion/Live-action
The Wombles	3	52	Canada; United Kingdom	1997–98	ITV	Stop-Motion
Wyrd Sisters	1	6	United Kingdom	1997	Channel 4	Traditional

Anime television series first aired in 1997
Title	Seasons	Episodes	Country	Year	Original channel	Technique
Anime Ganbare Goemon	1	23	Japan	1997–98	TBS	Traditional
Anime TV de Hakken! Tamagotchi	1	27	Japan	1997–98		Traditional
Bakusō Kyōdai Let's & Go!! WGP	1	51	Japan	1997		Traditional
Battle Athletes Victory	1	26	Japan	1997–98		Traditional
Berserk	1	25	Japan	1997–98		Traditional
Burn-Up Excess	1	13	Japan	1997–98		Traditional
Cho Mashin Hero Wataru	1	51	Japan	1997–98		Traditional
Chūka Ichiban!	1	52	Japan	1997–98		Traditional
Clamp School Detectives	1	26	Japan	1997		Traditional
Cutie Honey Flash	1	39	Japan	1997–98		Traditional
Don't Leave Me Alone, Daisy	1	12	Japan	1997		Traditional
Dr. Slump		74	Japan	1997–99		Traditional
Eat-Man	1	12	Japan	1997		Traditional
Ehrgeiz	1	12	Japan	1997		Traditional
The File of Young Kindaichi		148	Japan	1997–2000		Traditional
Flame of Recca	1	42	Japan	1997–98		Traditional
Grander Musashi	1	25	Japan	1997		Traditional
Hakugei: Legend of the Moby Dick	1	26	Japan	1997–99		Traditional
Hareluya II Boy	1	25	Japan	1997		Traditional
Haunted Junction	1	12	Japan	1997		Traditional
Hyper Police	1	25	Japan	1997		Traditional
In the Beginning: The Bible Stories	1	26	Japan	1997		Traditional
Kero Kero Chime	2	30	Japan	1997		Traditional
The King of Braves GaoGaiGar	1	49	Japan	1997–98		Traditional
Mach GoGoGo	1	34	Japan	1997		Traditional
Manmaru the Ninja Penguin	1	30	Japan	1997–98		Traditional
Master of Mosquiton '99	1	26	Japan	1997–98		Traditional
Maze	1	25	Japan	1997		Traditional
Pokémon	26	1241+	Japan	1997–present		Traditional
Revolutionary Girl Utena	1	39	Japan	1997		Traditional
Sakura Momoko Gekijō Coji-Coji		100	Japan	1997–99		Traditional
Shinkai Densetsu Meremanoid	1	24	Japan	1997–98		Traditional
Slayers Try	1	26	Japan	1997		Traditional
Super Express Hikarian	1	156	Japan	1997–2000		Traditional
Tenchi in Tokyo	1	26	Japan	1997		Traditional
Those Who Hunt Elves 2	1	12	Japan	1997		Traditional
Tokyo Pig	1	61	Japan	1997–98		Traditional
Vampire Princess Miyu	1	26	Japan	1997–98		Traditional
Virus Buster Serge	1	12	Japan	1997		Traditional
Yume no Crayon Oukoku		70	Japan	1997–99		Traditional

== See also ==
- List of animated feature films of 1997
- List of Japanese animation television series of 1997
