= KTV2 =

Kuwaiti English-language TV channel

Kuwait TV 2
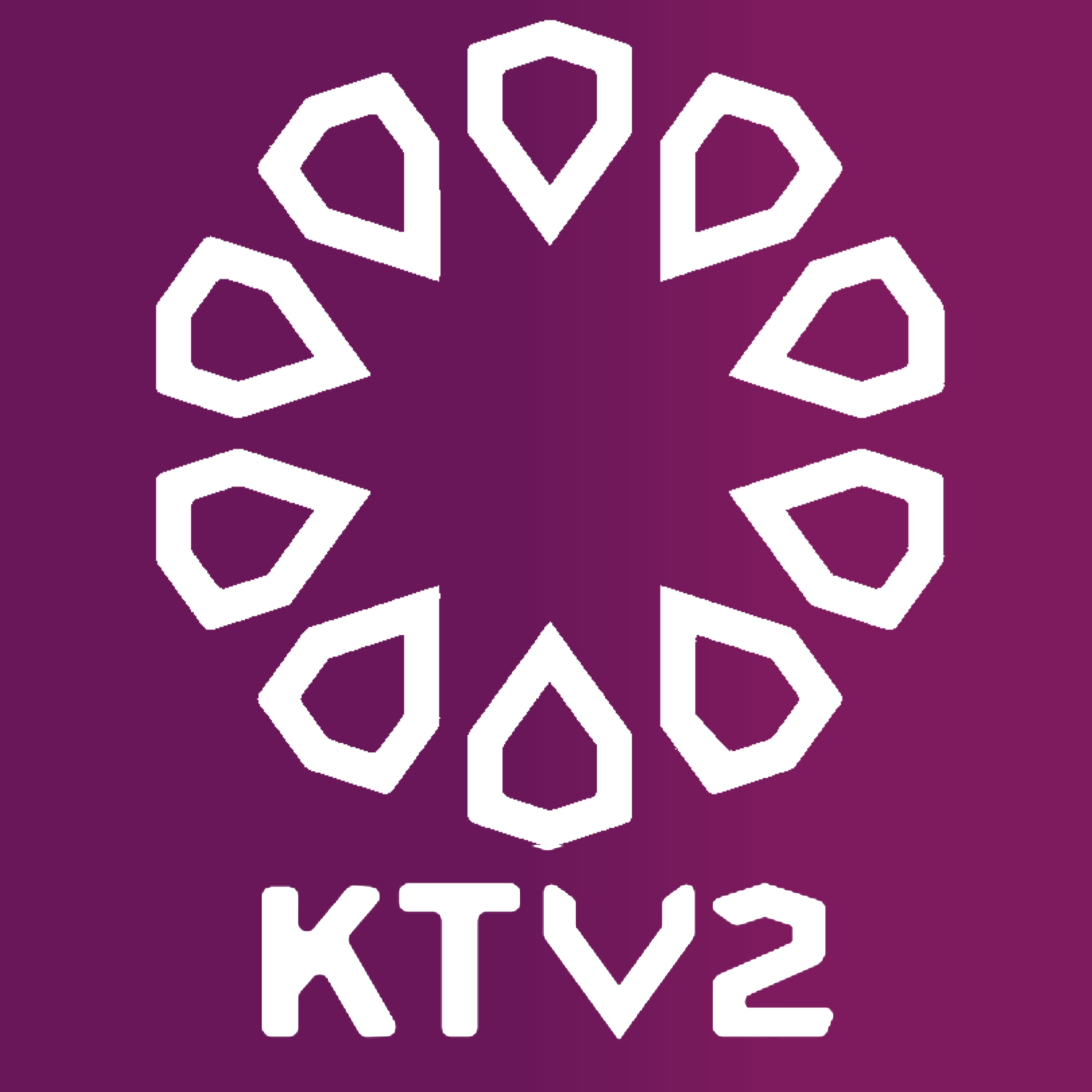
- Country: Kuwait

Programming
- Picture format: 1080p

Ownership
- Owner: Kuwait Television

History
- Launched: December 1978; 47 years ago

Kuwait television channel 2 (KTV2) is Kuwait's governmental television channel dedicated for the English-speaking public. The channel broadcasts English-speaking shows, local programmes, news, English-subtitled local serials, English-speaking international serials, and English-speaking or English-subtitled movies. Kuwait television started its broadcast on 15 November 1961; as the official television of the ministry of information of the state of Kuwait. There are so far five channels: channel 1 (Al-Oula, KTV1), used for Arabic programming; channel 2 (KTV2); channel 3 (KTV3 or sport), for purely sports programming; channel 4 (KTV4), for pre-recorded and re-runs of movies and serials from other channels; and channel 5 (KTV-Plus), Kuwait's official governmental satellite broadcast, currently merged with KTV1. The Kuwait Ministry of Information has an online feed of three of its channels.

The channel was first conceived in 1971 as part of a plan to convert KTV to color and initiate a three-channel service. The station started broadcasting in December 1978. The channel was initially cultural in nature, broadcasting educational and cultural programming, award-winning movies, plays in classical Arabic and discussion of theses. The goal of the service was to be a "people's university", targeting the educated sectors of Kuwait's population.

Ahead of the launch of the channel, KTV did a survey to ascertain what would viewers see on the new service, the majority of which came from the middle class. During its first month on air, 72% of the content on KTV2 was foreign, in contrast to 18% on KTV1.

== Programs ==
=== Former ===
==== Imported shows ====
===== Action =====
- The A-Team
- Blue Thunder
- The Cape
- Hardcastle and McCormick
- The Highwayman
- Knight Rider
- L.A. Heat
- MacGyver
- A Man Called Hawk
- Miami Vice
- Sea Hunt
- South Beach
- Starsky & Hutch
- The Wizard

===== Animated shows =====
- ABC Weekend Special
- Action Man
- The Addams Family
- The Adventures of Blinky Bill
- The Adventures of Dawdle the Donkey
- The Adventures of Raggedy Ann and Andy
- The Adventures of Tintin
- Aladdin
- The All New Popeye Hour
- Alvin and the Chipmunks
- Amigo and Friends
- The Angry Beavers
- The Animal Shelf
- The Animals of Farthing Wood
- Animaniacs
- Around the World in 80 Days
- Arthur
- Arthur! and the Square Knights of the Round Table
- Babar
- The Baby Huey Show
- Batman: The Animated Series
- The Bear's Island
- The Berenstain Bears
- Big Dog, Little Dog
- Biker Mice From Mars
- Bimble's Bucket
- Bionic Six
- Bob the Builder
- Bonkers
- The Bots Master
- BraveStarr
- Bucky O'Hare and the Toad Wars!
- The Bugs Bunny Show
- The Busy World of Richard Scarry
- Cadillacs and Dinosaurs
- Captain Caveman and the Teen Angels
- Captain Planet and the Planeteers
- Captain Zed and the Zee Zone
- Care Bears
- The Care Bears Family
- Caroline and Her Friends
- Casper and Friends
- Cave Kids
- Centurions
- The Charlie Brown and Snoopy Show
- Chip 'n Dale: Rescue Rangers
- Cro
- Darkwing Duck
- Dennis the Menace
- Denver, the Last Dinosaur
- Dexter's Laboratory
- Dinky Di's
- Dino Babies
- Dinosaucers
- Diplodos
- Disney's Adventures of the Gummi Bears
- Dog City
- Donkey Kong
- Donkey Kong Country
- Double Dragon
- Dragon Flyz
- Dream Street
- DuckTales
- Dumb and Dumber
- Ed, Edd n Eddy
- The Enchanted House
- Fantastic Max
- Fat Albert and the Cosby Kids
- Felix the Cat
- Flitze Firetooth
- Foofur
- Gadget Boy & Heather
- Galtar and the Golden Lance
- Garfield and Friends
- The Get Along Gang
- Goof Troop
- G.I. Joe: A Real American Hero
- Hans Christian Andersen
- Happily Ever After: Fairy Tales for Every Child
- Happy Ness: Secret of the Loch
- Heathcliff
- Hello Kitty's Furry Tale Theater
- Help!... It's the Hair Bear Bunch!
- Hey Arnold!
- Hurricanes
- Inspector Gadget
- The Karate Kid
- Kimba the White Lion
- Laurel and Hardy
- The Legends of Treasure Island
- Little Bear
- The Little Lulu Show
- The Little Rascals
- The Littles
- Loggerheads
- The Lone Ranger
- Lulu Zipadoo
- Macron 1
- The Magic School Bus
- The Magical World of Gigi
- Marsupilami
- Marvel Action Hour
- The Mask: Animated Series
- MGM Cartoon Classics
- Mighty Ducks: The Animated Series
- The Mozart Band
- Mr. Men and Little Miss
- My Little Pony
- My Pet Monster
- M.A.S.K.
- The New Adventures of Winnie the Pooh
- The New Adventures of Zorro
- The New 3 Stooges
- Noveltoons
- Nutri Ventures
- Pac-Man
- Paw Paws
- Pim
- Pingu
- Pink Panther and Sons
- Pocket Dragon Adventures
- Pokémon
- Pole Position
- Police Academy
- Popeye and Son
- Popples
- Postman Pat
- Puppy in My Pocket: Adventures in Pocketville
- The Raccoons
- Rainbow Brite
- Rambo: The Force of Freedom
- Raw Toonage
- The Real Adventures of Jonny Quest
- The Real Ghostbusters
- The Ren & Stimpy Show
- Richie Rich
- The Road Runner Show
- Robinson Sucroe
- Roswell Conspiracies: Aliens, Myths and Legends
- Rubik, the Amazing Cube
- Rugrats
- Sandokan
- The Savage Dragon
- Scooby-Doo
- The Scooby-Doo Show
- The Secret Lives of Waldo Kitty
- She-Ra: Princess of Power
- Shirt Tales
- SilverHawks
- Skysurfer Strike Force
- Sonic the Hedgehog
- Sooty's Amazing Adventures
- The Smurfs
- Speed Racer
- Street Sharks
- Stunt Dawgs
- Super Dave: Daredevil for Hire
- The Super Mario Bros. Super Show!
- Swamp Thing
- Sylvanian Families
- The Sylvester & Tweety Mysteries
- Tabaluga
- TaleSpin
- Taz-Mania
- Teenage Mutant Ninja Turtles
- ThunderCats
- Tip the Mouse
- Tom and Jerry
- Tom & Jerry Kids
- The Transformers
- Trollkins
- Ultraforce
- Voltron: Defender of the Universe
- Walt Disney Cartoon Classics
- Walt Disney's Mickey and Donald
- Warner Bros. Cartoons
- Where on Earth Is Carmen Sandiego?
- Widget
- Wildfire
- Wild West C.O.W.-Boys of Moo Mesa
- The Wizard of Oz
- The Woody Woodpecker Show
- Yogi's Treasure Hunt

===== Children's Programmes =====
- 3-2-1 Contact
- ABC Afterschool Specials
- Adventures in Wonderland
- The Adventures of Pete and Pete
- A*mazing
- The Animal Express
- Animal Park
- Bailey Kipper's P.O.V.
- Banana Zoo
- Bananas in Pyjamas
- Barney & Friends
- Bay City Rollers
- Bay City
- Beakman's World
- Big Blue Marble
- The Big Comfy Couch
- Bits and Bytes
- Break Point
- Butterfly Island
- Camp Wilderness
- Captain Power and the Soldiers of the Future
- Cedric the Crow
- Chicken Minute
- Children of Fire Mountain
- The Children of the New Forest
- Chocky
- Chocky's Challenge
- Chocky's Children
- Dani's House
- Deepwater Haven
- Double Dare
- The Edison Twins
- The Electric Company
- Electronic Office
- Emma and Grandpa
- Eureeka's Castle
- Faerie Tale Theatre
- Finders Keepers
- The Fire-Raiser
- Finger Tips
- The Friends of My Forest
- Fun House
- The Genie From Down Under
- Ghostwriter
- The Gift
- God's Wonderful Railway
- Going Bananas
- Groundling Marsh
- Haydaze
- Hi-5
- How to Draw Cartoons
- The Huggabug Club
- Interbang
- Iris, The Happy Professor
- Just for the Record
- Kelly
- The Kids of Degrassi Street
- The Kidsongs Television Show
- Kratts' Creatures
- The Krofft Superstar Hour
- Lassie
- Legends of the Hidden Temple
- Lift Off
- Mac & Muttley
- Magic Mountain
- Matt and Jenny
- The Micro at Work
- Mission Top Secret
- Moon Jumper
- Mr. Wizard's World
- My Secret Identity
- Nickelodeon Guts
- Night of the Red Hunter
- Not Another Science Show
- Open Sesame
- OWL/TV
- Pajanimals
- Pals
- Pappyland
- Popular Mechanics for Kids
- Power Rangers
- Press Gang
- Professor Lobster
- Pugwall
- Pumpkin Patch
- The Reppies
- Road to Avonlea
- Runaway Bay
- Samson Superslug
- Sam's Luck
- The Scheme of Things
- The Scientific Eye
- Sea Urchins
- Seal Morning
- The Secret Series
- Sesame Street
- Shining Time Station
- Ship to Shore
- Spellbinder
- Square One Television
- Standby...Lights! Camera! Action!
- Steel Riders
- Swallows and Amazons Forever!
- Take Hart
- Teletubbies
- Theodore Tugboat
- Time Masters
- Tots TV
- T. and T.
- A Wide World of Children
- Wimzie's House
- Wizadora
- Wonderstruck
- Woof!
- You and Me
- Zak Tales

===== Drama =====
- Adderly
- The Adventure World of Sir Edmund Hillary
- The Adventures of Brisco County, Jr.
- African Skies
- Airwolf
- Automan
- The Beachcombers
- Beauty and the Beast
- Bergerac
- Blue Heelers
- The Blue Knight
- Booker
- Bordertown
- Cagney & Lacey
- Call Me Mister
- The Challenge
- Champagne Charlie
- CHiPS
- Code of Vengeance
- The Cosby Mysteries
- Crazy Like a Fox
- Cribb
- Danger Bay
- A Dangerous Life
- Diamonds
- Dr. Quinn, Medicine Woman
- El C.I.D.
- Emily of New Moon
- The Endless Game
- The Equalizer
- Erebus: The Aftermath
- ER
- E.N.G.
- The Family Tree
- Farscape
- Final Run
- Flambards
- The Flying Doctors
- The Fourth Arm
- The Franchise Affair
- Great Expectations
- Hanlon
- Heart of the City
- High Mountain Rangers
- Highlander: The Series
- Homicide: Life on the Street
- Hooperman
- Hoover vs. The Kennedys
- Hot Shots
- Hunter
- In the Heat of the Night
- Island Son
- Jack and Mike
- Jake and the Fatman
- Jim Henson's The Storyteller
- J.J. Starbuck
- Katts and Dog
- The Lancaster Miller Affair
- The Last Season
- The Lazarus Man
- Les Faucheurs de marguerites
- Life Goes On
- Little House on the Prairie
- Lonesome Dove: The Series
- L.A. Doctors
- L.A. Law
- Magnum, P.I.
- The Main Chance
- The Man from Snowy River
- Matlock
- Max Headroom
- Midnight Caller
- Minder
- The Mississippi
- Moonlighting
- Moon Over Miami
- Morningstar/Eveningstar
- Murder Call
- Murder, She Wrote
- Murphy's Law
- My Life as a Dog
- The New Lassie
- Northern Exposure
- Ohara
- The Oldest Rookie
- Oshin
- Our House
- The Paper Chase
- Peaceable Kingdom
- A Perfect Spy
- Pit Pony
- A Place to Call Home
- Players
- Pride and Prejudice
- Private Eye
- Quantum Leap
- Quincy, M.E.
- Q.E.D.
- Rags to Riches
- Reasonable Doubts
- Renegade
- Return to Eden
- Rhodes
- The Rockford Files
- Rookie Blue
- The Saint
- seaQuest DSV
- The Secrets of Lake Success
- Sherlock Holmes
- Shōgun
- Simon & Simon
- Sirens
- Sisters
- Sliders
- Smith
- Sonny Spoon
- Space Island One
- Space Precinct
- Spenser: For Hire
- Star Trek: The Next Generation
- Starman
- Street Hawk
- Street Justice
- Street Legal
- Studio 5-B
- Tanamera – Lion of Singapore
- TekWar
- Top of the Hill
- Tour of Duty
- Trapper John, M.D.
- Treasure Island in Outer Space
- Troubles
- The Twilight Zone
- Unsub
- The Untouchables
- Walker, Texas Ranger
- The Waltons
- Watch All Night
- White Fang
- Wiseguy
- Wolf
- The Wonder Years
- Xena: Warrior Princess
- A Year in the Life
- Zorro

===== Sports =====
- Fishing the West
- The Spectacular World of Guinness Records
- Wacky World of Sports

===== Detective =====
- The Law & Harry McGraw
- Remington Steele
- Simon & Simon

===== Game Shows =====
- Brains & Brawn
- The Crystal Maze
- Fort Boyard

===== Comedy =====
- 227
- 2point4 Children
- 3rd Rock from the Sun
- ALF
- America's Funniest Home Videos
- Annie McGuire
- Benson
- Better Days
- Blossom
- Bonnie
- Boston Common
- Buddies
- Bustin' Loose
- Caroline in the City
- Charles in Charge
- The Charmings
- Coach
- Coming of Age
- Cory in the House
- The Cosby Show
- Dave's World
- A Different World
- Diff'rent Strokes
- Dinosaurs
- The Duck Factory
- Ellen
- Everybody Loves Raymond
- Everything's Relative
- Family Matters
- Foley Square
- Frasier
- Fresh Fields
- The Fresh Prince of Bel-Air
- Full House
- Gimme a Break!
- The Golden Palace
- The Gregory Hines Show
- Growing Pains
- Hey Dad..!
- Hit Squad
- The Hogan Family
- I Married Dora
- It'll Be Alright on the Night
- The Jeff Foxworthy Show
- Just for Laughs
- Just the Ten of Us
- Kate & Allie
- The King of Queens
- Learning the Ropes
- The Likely Lads
- The Lucy Show
- Mad About You
- Married... with Children
- Mary
- Me and the Boys
- The Mighty Jungle
- Mind Your Language
- Mr. Belvedere
- The Munsters Today
- The Muppet Show
- Murphy Brown
- My Wife Next Door
- The New Adventures of Beans Baxter
- NewsRadio
- Night Court
- The Nutt House
- Open All Hours
- Out of This World
- The Parent 'Hood
- Perfect Strangers
- Pokerface
- Private Benjamin
- The Pursuit of Happiness
- The Robert Guillaume Show
- Roseanne
- Saved by the Bell
- Sidekicks
- Sledge Hammer!
- Sorry!
- Spitting Image
- Terry and June
- The Three Stooges
- Throb
- Thunder Alley
- Together We Stand
- The Tracey Ullman Show
- TV's Bloopers & Practical Jokes
- The Two of Us
- Valerie
- The Wayans Bros.
- Webster
- What a Country!
- What's Happening Now!!
- WKRP in Cincinnati
- You Can't Take It with You
- You're Only Young Twice

===== Magazine =====
- Bodymatters
- Cybernet
- Martha Stewart Living
- Movies, Games and Videos
- Smithsonian World

===== Space Opera =====
- Babylon 5

===== Education =====
- Encyclopædia Britannica

===== Biographical =====
- Anastasia: The Mystery of Anna

===== Documentary =====
- The American Century
- Animals of Africa
- Around the World in 80 Days with Michael Palin
- The Ascent of Man
- The Australian Ark
- Beyond 2000
- Body Matters
- Children's Hospital
- The Craft of the Potter
- Computers in Control
- COPS
- The Cousteau Odyssey
- Cousteau's Rediscovery of the World I
- A Day in the Life
- Dive to Adventure
- Equinox
- A Finite World: Global Population Problems and Solutions
- Footsteps
- The Great Wall of Iron
- The Health Show
- Horizon
- In the Shadow of Fujisan
- The Infinite Voyager
- Just the Job
- Life and Death
- The Living Planet
- Lorne Greene's New Wilderness
- The Moviemakers
- National Geographic Specials
- Natural World
- The Ocean World of John Stoneman
- Oddie in Paradise
- On the Wings of the Wind
- Orphans of the Wild
- Path of the Rain God
- Perspective
- The Politics of Food
- Portrait of the Soviet Union
- The Real West
- Rescue 911
- The Road to War
- Safari to Adventure
- Sea Power
- Scuba World
- The Seal Morning
- Supersense
- Talk to the Animals
- That's Hollywood
- Top Cops
- Trials of Life
- The Ultimate Machine
- Weird and Wonderful
- Wild America
- Wild Kingdom
- Wildlife in Australia
- Wildlife on One
- The World About Us
- World of Survival
- The Yellow River

===== Western =====
- Paradise

===== Entertainment =====
- Great Circuses of the World

===== Anthology =====
- The Alfred Hitchcock Hour
- Alfred Hitchcock Presents
- Carol & Company
- The Hidden Room
- The Magical World of Disney
- Tales from the Darkside
- Tales of the Unexpected
- The Twilight Zone

===== Variety =====
- Donny & Marie
- The Mickey Mouse Club

===== Soap Opera =====
- Falcon Crest
- The Yellow Rose

===== Reality =====
- America's Funniest People
- Healthy, Wealthy and Wise
- House Rules
- Incredible Sunday
- More Real People
