= RAEN =

RAEN or Raen may refer to:

- Radio Amateurs Emergency Network
- Raen, a character in the novel Serpent's Reach
- Raen, a character in The Wheel of Time (TV series)
- Raen, a character in Vampire Princess Miyu
