= Interrobang (disambiguation) =

An interrobang ‽ is a typographic symbol.

Interrobang or Interrabang may also refer to

- Interrobang (Bayside album), 2019
- Interrobang (Switchfoot album), 2021
- Interrabang (film), a 1969 Italian giallo film

== See also ==
- Interbang, an Italian television series
