= Ministry of Information (Kuwait) =

Government ministry of Kuwait

- وزارة الإعلام

Agency overview
- Formed: 7 January 1979; 46 years ago
- Headquarters: Kuwait City
- Minister responsible: Hamad Ahmed Ruh Al-Din
- Website: www.media.gov.kw

The Ministry of Information (Arabic: وزارة الإعلام, romanized: Wizārat al-Iʿlām) is one of the governmental bodies in the State of Kuwait. It was established on 7 January 1979. The ministry is currently held by Abdulrahman Badah Al Mutairi.

The Ministry operates the official radio and television of the State of Kuwait.

== Television ==
Kuwait Television

- KTV1
- KTV2
- KTV Sport
- KTV Sport Plus
- KTV Kids
- Al Qurain channel
- Al Araby Channel
- Ethraa Channel
- almajles channel

== Radio ==
- Radio Kuwait 1
- Kuwait Radio 2
- Kuwait Radio Quran
- Kuwait FM
- Easy FM 92.5
- Radio Classical Arabic
- Radio Hona Kuwait
- Radio Shaabya
- SuperStation
