= RK FM =

Super Station 99.7 Radio Kuwait
Kuwait City; Kuwait
- Frequency: 99.7 MHz

Programming
- Format: Popular music/mix

Ownership
- Owner: Ministry Of Information (Kuwait)

History
- First air date: August 2, 1983

Links
- Website: Live Webcast

RK FM (Radio Kuwait) also known as (SuperStation) is a radio station located in Kuwait City, Kuwait.

The station is broadcast on the FM band at a frequency of 99.7 MHz.

Radio Kuwait 99.7 broadcasts music, news, information, talk and live shows. However, RK FM is primarily considered a music station.

The most common types of music played are hip hop, rock, and rap, which are based on American, British and some middle-east music creators.
