= Kuwait Television =

Kuwait TV
- Country: Kuwait
- Broadcast area: Middle East, Europe, North America, Asia, Australia, South America, Pakistan

Programming
- Picture format: 1080p HD (only)

Ownership
- Owner: Ministry Of Information (Kuwait)

History
- Launched: 15 November 1961; 64 years ago

Links
- Website: Official website

Kuwait Television is Kuwait's official state-run television station, and part of the Kuwaiti Ministry of Information.

Kuwait Television has 9 channels, a satellite channel, and a streaming platform:

- Kuwait Television Channel 1
- Kuwait Television Channel 2
- Kuwait Television Sport Channel
- Kuwait Television Sport 2 Channel
- Kuwait Television Kids Channel
- Kuwait Television Al Akhbar Channel
- Kuwait Television Al Qurain Channel
- Kuwait Television Al Araby Channel
- Kuwait Television Ithra' Channel
- Kuwait Television Al Majles Channel (satellite)
- Kuwait Television Thalik Bilbayt Channel
- Kuwait Television Drama Channel
- Kuwait Television Masriya Channel
- 51 Kuwait (Streaming Platform)

== History ==
=== Early history ===
The history of Kuwaiti television started on an unknown date in late 1959 or early 1960. Merchant Murad Behbehani, an agent working for RCA, set up a 100-watt transmitter with a limited schedule consisting of cartoons and feature films. His only goal was to encourage sales of television sets.

Kuwait Television began broadcasting on 15 November 1961, taking over the control of Bahbahani's television station, from the eastern district of Kuwait City. It was the first TV station in the Arabian Peninsula, founded and created by Behbehani, initially broadcasting in black and white for four hours a day. By the early 1970s, it started covering topics related to Israel, which Kuwait doesn't recognize, under the name Know Your Enemy. Broadcasters in other Arab countries refused to cover Israeli developments. At the time, it had among the most advanced television infrastructure in the Arabian region, with a single transmitter comfortable enough to reach the entire country, coupled with that, most Kuwaitis were affluent enough to afford a television set, which corresponded to over 100,000 sets in that period.

It started color television using the PAL system in March 1974, for the first ever round of the Arabian Gulf Cup, from Bahrain. Early broadcasters included Salem Al-Fahd, Reza Faili and Jassim Al-Shehab. In 1978, KTV moved to new, technologically advanced premises. Studios varied between 30 and 800 square meters, the largest of which was used for Iftah Ya Simsim, the Arabic adaptation of Sesame Street.

=== Modern history ===
In May 2024, Kuwait Television launched 51 Kuwait, a streaming platform with all KTV shows as well as live access to all Kuwait TV channels. The name 51 was used to honour the first ever radio broadcast from Kuwait which was in May 1951. On 28 July, Kuwait TV launched the Al Akhbar Channel, which handles all international news coverage.

== Channels ==
=== Kuwait Television Channel 1 (KTV1) ===
KTV1 launched on 7 April 1992 with 24-hour broadcasting. By 1997, the channel was broadcasting Kuwaiti-produced programmes around the world. KTV1 is a state-run channel. Its programming cycle changes approximately every three months, and shows special content during the month of Ramadan. Daily programs on the channel include Good Morning Kuwait, Baitak, and Good Evening Kuwait. Also included in the broadcasts are a variety of cultural and religious programs, and coverage of state events.

=== Kuwait Television Channel 2 (KTV2) ===
KTV2 is the only one of the state-run channels to broadcast in English. The channel started broadcasting in 1978 as the Second Program. It shows English programs and Arabic programs that have been dubbed in English, showing family centered local programming. The channel's stated mission is to promote Kuwait's media abroad, to show foreign viewers something of Kuwaiti culture and news, and to foster relationships between the State, the Kuwaiti public, and English speakers in Kuwait.

=== Kuwait Television Al Akhbar Channel ===
Al Akhbar is the state-run international news coverage channel.

=== Kuwait Television Sport Channel (KTV Sport) and Kuwait Television Sport 2 Channel (KTV Sport 2) ===
KTV Sport began broadcasting on 1 November 1993. Initially chaired by Mohammed Al Zamel, this channel was considered at the time to be the leading sports channel in the Arabic Gulf region. It was originally a local sports channel, but in 2002, KTV Sport replaced their ground transmission with satellite transmission, enabling them to broadcast international sporting events as well. The channel also has a Plus variant.

=== Kuwait Television Al Araby Channel ===
Al Araby was launched on 25 February 2009, under the direction of the former Minister of Information, Sheikh Sabah Al Khalid Al Sabah. Its programming includes literary, cultural, scientific, and artistic based shows, and it also covers important cultural events. Al Araby coordinates with KTV1 when covering national events.

=== Kuwait Television Ithra' Channel ===
The Ithra' Channel is dedicated to religious programmes that educate viewers about Islam, Islamic principles, and Islam's spiritual value. It coordinates with the Kuwait Ministry of Awqaf and Islamic Affairs, as well as with the Awqaf Public Foundation to produce information that supports mainstream Islam, rather than extremist ideologies. The channel also covers religious events in Kuwait.

=== Other channels ===
Some other channels are:

- Kuwait Television Kids Channel
- Kuwait Television Channel
- Kuwait Television AlQurain Channel
- Kuwait Television AlMajles Channel
- Kuwait Television Thalik Bilbayt Channel
- Kuwait Television Drama Channel
