= List of animated feature films of 1997 =

This is a list of animated feature films first released in 1997.

== List ==
Title	Country	Director	Production company	Animation technique	Format	Notes	Release date	Duration
Adarna: The Mythical Bird	Philippines	Geirry A. Garccia	Guiding Light Productions, Inc. FLT Films International	Traditional	Theatrical	First feature-length theatrical animated film produced in the Philippines.	December 25, 1997	78 minutes
Ali Baba and the Pirates; Alì Babà e i pirati	Italy	Zlata Potancokova Belli	Airone Cinematografica	Traditional	Theatrical		October 10, 1997	80 minutes
Alien from the Darkness 淫獣エイリアン (Injū Alien)	Japan	Norio Takanami	PP Project; Pink Pineapple	Traditional	Direct-to-video; OVA		January 24, 1997	45 minutes
Anastasia	United States	Don Bluth; Gary Goldman	20th Century Fox (distributor); 20th Century Fox Animation; Fox Animation Studios	Traditional	Theatrical	First Don Bluth film to use digital ink and paint, and the first production of Fox Animation Studios and the inaugural release from 20th Century Fox Animation.	November 21, 1997	94 minutes
Anastasia	United States; Japan	Diane Eskenazi (uncredited)	Golden Films; Sony Wonder (distributor)	Traditional	Direct-to-video		May 20, 1997	48 minutes
Annabelle's Wish	United States	Roy Wilson	Ralph Edwards Productions	Traditional	Direct-to-video		October 21, 1997	54 minutes
Babes in Toyland	United States	Charles Grosvenor; Toby Bluth; Paul Sabella	Metro-Goldwyn-Mayer Animation	Traditional	Direct-to-video		October 14, 1997	74 minutes
Bakusō Kyōdai Let's & Go!! WGP Bōsō Miniyonku Dai Tsuiseki! 爆走兄弟レッツ&ゴー!!WGP 暴走ミニ四駆大追跡! (The Racing Brothers Let's & Go!! WGP Runaway Mini 4WD Great Pursuit!)	Japan	Tetsurō Amino	Xebec	Traditional	Theatrical		July 5, 1997	80 minutes
The Batman/Superman Movie: World's Finest	United States	Toshihiko Masuda	Warner Bros. Animation	Traditional	Television film	Originally aired as a part of the second season of Superman: The Animated Series, the plot is set inbetween episodes 28 and 32 of the overall series.	October 4, 1997	64 minutes
Beauty and the Beast	United States	Diane Eskenazi (uncredited)	Golden Films; Hong Ying Animation Co. (overseas animation production); Sony Wonder (distributor)	Traditional	Television film	Golden Films' second adaptation of the Beauty and the Beast story after the 1992 film.	July 13, 1997	49 minutes
Beauty and the Beast: The Enchanted Christmas	United States; Canada	Andy Knight	Walt Disney Video Premiere	Traditional	Direct-to-video	Sequel to Beauty and the Beast (1991); first Disney direct-to-video film to use digital ink and paint.	November 11, 1997	72 minutes
Benjamin Bluemchen; Benjamin Blümchen	Germany; Luxembourg	Gerhard Hahn	Hahn Film AG	Traditional	Theatrical		December 4, 1997	75 minutes
The Brave Little Toaster to the Rescue	United States	Robert C. Ramirez	Hyperion Animation; The Kushner-Locke Company	Traditional	Direct-to-video	Sequel to The Brave Little Toaster (1987).	May 20, 1997	74 minutes
Case Closed: The Time-Bombed Skyscraper 名探偵コナン 時計じかけの摩天楼 (Meitantei Konan: Tokei Jikake no Matenrō)	Japan	Kenji Kodama	TMS Entertainment; Toho (distributor)	Traditional	Theatrical	First installment of the Case Closed film series.	April 19, 1997	94 minutes
Cats Don't Dance	United States	Mark Dindal	Turner Feature Animation	Traditional	Theatrical	Second and last film produced by Turner Feature Animation, which was later absorbed into Warner Bros. Animation after the Time Warner merger with parent company Turner Entertainment.	March 28, 1997	77 minutes
A Chinese Ghost Story: The Tsui Hark Animation; Xiao Qian	Hong Kong	Andrew Chan	Film Workshop; Triangle Staff	Traditional	Theatrical		July 26, 1997	82 minutes
A Christmas Carol	United States	Stan Phillips	DIC Entertainment	Traditional	Direct-to-video		October 11, 1997	72 minutes
City Hunter: The Motion Picture シティーハンタースペシャル グッド・バイ・マイ・スイート・ハート (City Hunter Special: Goodbye My Sweetheart)	Japan	Kazuo Yamazaki; Kenji Kodama	Sunrise	Traditional	Television film		April 25, 1997	88 minutes
The Count of Monte Cristo	Canada; United States	Rick Allen; Laura Shepherd	Blye Migicovsky Productions; Phoenix Animation Studios	Traditional	Direct-to-video		May 15, 1997	45 minutes
Crayon Shin-chan: Pursuit of the Balls of Darkness クレヨンしんちゃん 暗黒タマタマ大追跡 (Kureyon Shinchan: Ankoku Tamatama Daitsuiseki)	Japan	Keiichi Hara	Shin-Ei Animation; Toho (distributor)	Traditional	Theatrical		April 19, 1997	100 minutes
The Day the Earth Moved 地球が動いた日 (Chikyū ga Ugoita Hi)	Japan	Toshio Gotō	Tama Production	Traditional	Theatrical	Fictionalised account of the aftermath of the Great Hanshin earthquake, which took place on January 17, 1995.	July 22, 1997	76 minutes
Deep Sea Fleet: Submarine 707 深海の艦隊 サブマリン707 (Sinkai no Kantai Sabumarin Nana Maru Nana)	Japan	Teruo Kogure	Knack Productions	Traditional	Direct-to-video; OVA		January 10, 1997	45 minutes
Dibu: The Movie; Dibu: La película	Argentina	Carlos Olivieri; Alejandro Stoessel	Patagonik Film Group	Traditional/Live action	Theatrical		July 10, 1997	105 minutes
The Dog of Flanders: The Movie 劇場版 フランダースの犬 (Gekijôban Furandāsu no Inu)	Japan	Yoshio Kuroda	Shochiku (distributor); Nippon Animation	Traditional	Theatrical	Feature film remake of the 1975 animated television series Dog of Flanders, based on the same source material, which originally ran from January 5 to December 28 of that year and produced by the same studio that made the earlier TV series.	March 15, 1997	104 minutes
Doraemon: Nobita and the Spiral City ドラえもん のび太のねじ巻き都市冒険記 (Doraemon: Nobita no Neji maki Shitī Bôkenki)	Japan	Tsutomu Shibayama	Asatsu; Shin-Ei Animation; Toho (distributor)	Traditional	Theatrical		March 8, 1997	99 minutes
Dragon Ball GT: A Hero's Legacy ドラゴンボールGT(ジーティー) 悟空外伝! 勇気の証しは四星球 (Doragon Bōru Jī Tī: Gokū Gaiden! Yūki no Akashi wa Sūshinchū)	Japan	Yoshihiro Ueda; Hidehiko Kadota	Toei Animation	Traditional	Television special		March 26, 1997	46 minutes
Droids: The Pirates and the Prince	United States; Canada		Lucasfilm; Nelvana; 20th Century Fox Home Entertainment (distributor)	Traditional	Direct-to-video; Compilation film	Compilation film of the second story arc of the animated series Star Wars: Droids (1985–1986), covering the first four episodes of the plot and leaving out the concluding episode ("Coby and the Starhunters") from the duration of the narrative.	February 11, 1997	85 minutes
Elmer's Adventure: My Father's Dragon エルマーの冒険 MY FATHER'S DRAGON (Erumā no Bōken Mai Fāzāsu Doragon)	Japan	Masami Hata	Shochiku	Traditional	Theatrical		July 5, 1997	98 minutes
The End of Evangelion 新世紀エヴァンゲリオン劇場版 Air/まごころを、君に (Shin Seiki Evangerion Gekijō-ban: Ea/Magokoro o, Kimi ni)	Japan	Kazuya Tsurumaki; Hideaki Anno	Kadokawa Shoten; TV Tokyo; Sega Corporation; Production I.G; Movic; Starchild; Gainax Co., Ltd.	Traditional	Theatrical		July 19, 1997	87 minutes
Ewoks: The Haunted Village	United States; Canada		Lucasfilm; Nelvana; 20th Century Fox Home Entertainment (distributor)	Traditional	Direct-to-video; Compilation film	Compilation film of episodes 1 ("The Cries of the Trees"), 2 ("The Haunted Village"), 3 ("Rampage of the Phlogs") and 9 ("Sunstar vs. Shadowstone") from season one of the animated series Ewoks (1985–1986) that ran for two seasons and 26 episodes from September 7, 1985, to December 13, 1986.	February 11, 1997	75 minutes
The Fearless Four; Die furchtlosen Vier	Germany; United States; United Kingdom	Michael Coldewey; Eberhard Junkersdorf; Jürgen Richter	Warner Bros. Family Entertainment (distributor); Munich Animation	Traditional	Theatrical		October 2, 1997	87 minutes (German, original release); 81 minutes (English dubbed version)
Fujimi Orchestra 富士見二丁目交響楽団 (Fujimi Nichōme Kōkyō Gakudan)	Japan	Akira Nishimori	AIC; Bee Media; Brain's Base	Traditional	Direct-to-video; OVA		July 22, 1997	60 minutes
Go to Hell!!	Australia	Ray Nowland		Traditional	Theatrical		1997	73 minutes
Hercules	United States	Ron Clements; John Musker	Walt Disney Pictures (distributor); Walt Disney Feature Animation	Traditional	Theatrical	The eighth Disney animated feature of the Disney Renaissance.	June 27, 1997	93 minutes
Hercules	United States	Diane Eskenazi (uncredited)	Golden Films; Sony Wonder (distributor)	Traditional	Direct-to-video		February 11, 1997	48 minutes
Herkules	Germany	Roswitha Haas	Dingo Pictures	Traditional	Direct-to-video		December 31, 1997	45 minutes
Hermes – Winds of Love ヘルメス－愛は風の如く (Hermes – Ai Wa Kaze No Gotoku)	Japan	Tetsuo Imazawa	Happy Science; Studio Junio; Arts Pro; Animation Staff Room; Sony PCL	Traditional	Theatrical		April 12, 1997	117 minutes
Home of Acorns どんぐりの家 (Donguri no Ie)	Japan	Takashi Anno; Osamu Yamamoto (chief director)	Ajia-do Animation Works; Japanese Federation of the Deaf; Kyosaren	Traditional	Theatrical	The film won the Excellence Award in the 1997 Japan Media Arts Festival (Animation Division).		100 minutes
Hua Mulan	Italy	Orlando Corradi	Mondo TV	Traditional				87 minutes
I Married a Strange Person!	United States	Bill Plympton	Italtoons	Traditional	Theatrical		September 8, 1997	73 minutes
Jiang de Kailaban jue 倔强的凯拉班 (The Stubborn Kailaban); Kerabans phantastische Reise (Keraban's Fantastic Journey)	China; Germany	Manfred Durniok; Hong Hu Zhao	Shanghai Animation Film Studio	Stop motion	Theatrical	Based on the 1883 novel Kéraban the Inflexible (Keraban-le-têtu) by Jules Verne.	May 11, 1997	90 minutes
Jigoku Sensei Nūbē: Gozen 0 toki Nūbē Shisu 地獄先生ぬ～べ～ 午前0時ぬ～べ～死す (Hell Teacher Nūbē: 0 a.m. Nube Dead)	Japan	Yukio Kaizawa	Toei Animation	Traditional	Theatrical		March 8, 1997	45 minutes
Journey Beneath the Sea	United States; Canada	Stephen Anderson; Roman Arambula; Keith Ingham	Hyperion Pictures	Traditional	Direct-to-video; Compilation film	Seventh compilation film of the animated television series The Oz Kids (1996).	March 11, 1997	66 minutes
Jungle Emperor Leo 劇場版 ジャングル大帝 (Gekijōban Janguru Taitei)	Japan	Yoshio Takeuchi	Shochiku (distributor); Tezuka Productions	Traditional	Theatrical		August 1, 1997	99 minutes
Katharina & Witt, Fiction & Reality	Germany	Mariola Brillowska; Charles Kissing	Interpol Studios Hamburg	Traditional				100 minutes
Kigyō Senshi Yamazaki: Long Distance Call 企業戦士YAMAZAKI ~LONG DISTANCE CALL~ (Corporate Warrior Yamazaki: Long Distance Call)	Japan	Tsuneo Tominaga	Ripple Film; Bandai Music Entertainment; Happinet Pictures	Traditional	Direct-to-video; OVA		October 25, 1997	45 minutes
Kikansha Sensei 機関車先生 (Locomotive Teacher)	Japan	Kōzō Kusuba	Nippon Animation; Fuji Television Network; Tohokushinsha Film Corporation; Toho (distributor)	Traditional	Theatrical		March 29, 1997	133 minutes
King David	Italy	Orlando Corradi	Mondo TV	Traditional	Television film Compilation film			88 minutes
The Little Bastard; Kleines Arschloch	Germany	Michael Schaack; Veit Vollmer	Hahn Film AG (uncredited); Senator Film Produktion; TCB Toon Company Berlin; TFC Trickompany Filmproduktion	Traditional	Theatrical		March 6, 1997	82 minutes
The Land Before Time V: The Mysterious Island	United States	Charles Grosvenor	Universal Cartoon Studios	Traditional	Direct-to-video	Fifth installment in The Land Before Time film series.	December 9, 1997	74 minutes
Lapitch the Little Shoemaker; Čudnovate zgode šegrta Hlapića	Croatia; Germany	Milan Blažeković	Croatia Film; HaffaDiebold; ProSieben	Traditional	Theatrical	Croatian's highest grossing animated film.	June 23, 1997	83 minutes
Licca-chan to Yamaneko Hoshi no Tabi リカちゃんとヤマネコ 星の旅 (Licca-chan and the Wildcat: Star Trip)	Japan	Tsutomu Shibayama	Ajiado; Group TAC; Takara (distributor); Toho (distributor)	Traditional	Direct-to-video; OVA	Originally completed in 1994 to coincide with the 30th anniversary of the Licca-chan dress-up doll (1964-1994), produced and owned by Takara, and the franchise it spawned out.	September 12, 1997	78 minutes
Lupin III: Island of Assassins ルパン三世『ワルサーP38』 (Rupan Sansei: Walusa P38)	Japan	Toshiyasu Shinohara; Hiroyuki Yano	Tokyo Movie Shinsha; Nippon TV	Traditional	Television special		August 1, 1997	93 minutes
Megasónicos	Spain	Javier González de la Fuente, José Martínez Montero	Baleuko S.L.	Computer	Direct-to-video			85 minutes
Merry Christmas Little Moonky! Joyeux Noël Petit Moonky!	Belgium; France	André Moons; Pierre Urbain	Odec Kid Cartoons; Moonkys C^{o} G3 Productions; TF1; Radio Télévision Belge Francophone (RTBF); Les Films de la Perrine	Traditional	Television film			48 minutes
Mighty Ducks the Movie: The First Face-Off	United States	Doug Murphy	Walt Disney Television Animation	Traditional	Direct-to-video	Reedited alternate version of the eponymous two-part storyline "The First Face Off", the pilot of the television series Mighty Ducks: The Animated Series that aired from September 6, 1996 to January 17, 1997 for a total of 26 half-hour episodes.	April 8, 1997	66 minutes
Mondo Plympton	United States	Bill Plympton	Plymptoons	Traditional	Theatrical; Compilation film	A "best of..." compilation of animator Bill Plympton's classic shorts, including "Your Face", "How to Kiss", "One of Those Days", "25 Ways to Quit Smoking", "Plymptoons", "Nosehair" and "How to Make Love to a Woman". In between, an animated version of Bill answers questions about his life and career.	March 28, 1997	53 minutes
Monsieur Seguin's Goat; La Chèvre de Monsieur Seguin	France	Eveline Fouché; Vladimir Goncharov	Mathares; Borisfen; Millimages; PolyGram (distributor)	Traditional	Television special	Based on the 1866 book of the same title by Alphonse Daudet.	February 4, 1997	54 minutes
Neon Genesis Evangelion: Death & Rebirth 新世紀エヴァンゲリオン劇場版 シト新生 (Shin Seiki Evangerion Gekijō-ban: Shi to Shinsei)	Japan	Hideaki Anno; Masayuki; Kazuya Tsurumaki	Kadokawa Shoten; TV Tokyo; Sega Corporation; Production I.G; Movic; Starchild; Gainax Co., Ltd.	Traditional	Theatrical		March 15, 1997	72 minutes ("Death"); 28 minutes ("Rebirth"); 68 minutes ["Death (True)"] 68 minutes ["Death (True)^{2}", excluding intermission]
Neznayka on the Moon; Незнайка на Луне (Neznayka na lunye)	Russia	Yuriy Butyrin; Andrey Ignatenko; Aleksandr Lyutkevich	FAF Entertainment; Russkoye zoloto	Traditional		Based on the 1965 novel Dunno on the Moon by Nikolay Nosov.		151 minutes
Perfect Blue パーフェクトブルー (Pāfekuto Burū)	Japan	Satoshi Kon	Madhouse	Traditional	Theatrical	Directorial debut of Satoshi Kon.	August 5, 1997	81 minutes
The Purfume of the Invisible One; Le Parfum de l'invisible	France; United States	Francis Nielsen	Blue Dahlia Productions; Canal+ M6; Oranton Ltd. Pipangaï Production; Provision (distributor)	Traditional	Television film	Baseed on the 1986 comic Le Parfum de l'invisible by Milo Manara.		68 minutes
Pippi Longstocking	Sweden; Germany; Canada	Clive A. Smith	Nelvana Limited; AB Svensk Filmindustri	Traditional	Theatrical		August 22, 1997	77 minutes
Pocahontas and the Spider Woman	Italy	Kim Jun Ok	SEK Studio; Mondo TV	Traditional	Television film Compilation film			79 minutes
Pooh's Grand Adventure: The Search for Christopher Robin	United States	Karl Geurs	Walt Disney Video Premiere	Traditional	Direct-to-video		August 5, 1997	85 minutes
Princess Mononoke もののけ姫 (Mononoke-hime)	Japan	Hayao Miyazaki	Studio Ghibli; Toho (distributor)	Traditional	Theatrical	Japan's highest grossing anime film until Spirited Away (2001).	July 12, 1997	133 minutes
Psycho Diver: Soul Siren サイコダイバー 魔性菩薩 (Psycho Diver: Mashō Bosatsu)	Japan	Mamoru Kanbe	Madhouse; Studio Junio; Filmlink International; Goodhill Vision; Toei Video Co., Ltd.	Traditional	Direct-to-video; OVA		May 21, 1997	49 minutes
The Quest for the Key to Heaven; Jakten på himlens nyckel	Sweden	Karl Gunnar Holmqvist	Home Made and Lean Productions	Stop motion			January 24, 1997	73 minutes
The Secret of Anastasia	United States	Lee Lan	Schwartz & Company; UAV Corporation; Animation Ink; Hong Long Studio; Hong Ying Animation Company (uncredited); Suzhou Hong Ying Animation Company (uncredited)	Traditional	Direct-to-video	Second film in the UAV The Secret of... series.	December 25, 1997	57 minutes
Slayers Great スレイヤーズ ぐれいと (Sureiyāzu gurēto)	Japan	Kunihiko Yuyama; Hiroshi Watanabe	J.C.Staff	Traditional	Theatrical	Third installment in the Slayers film series.	August 2, 1997	64 minutes
Soreike! Anpanman: Niji no Piramiddo それいけ! アンパンマン 虹のピラミッド (Let's Go! Anpanman: The Pyramid of the Rainbow)	Japan	Shunji Ōga	Tokyo Movie Shinsha; Shochiku-Fuji Ltd. (distributor)	Traditional	Theatrical		July 28, 1997	56 minutes
Spacibo at the End of the Edo Period 幕末のスパシーボ (Bakumatsu no Spasibo)	Japan	Tetsu Dezaki	Magic Bus	Traditional	Theatrical		September 20, 1997	85 minutes
Spur to Glory: The Igaya Chiharu Story 栄光へのシュプール 猪谷千春物語 (Eikō e no Spur: Igaya Chiharu Monogatari)	Japan	Masaharu Okuwaki	Mushi Production	Traditional	Theatrical	Fictionalisation based on the life of Chiharu Igaya (born May 20, 1931), a Japanese alpine skier.	September 13, 1997	90 minutes
Spy of Darkness 淫獣VS女スパイ (Injū vs. Onna Spy)	Japan	Hisashi Tomii	PP Project; Pink Pineapple	Traditional	Direct-to-video; OVA		March 28, 1997	43 minutes
The Swan Princess: Escape from Castle Mountain	United States	Richard Rich	Nest Family Entertainment; Rich Animation Studios	Traditional	Direct-to-video	Sequel to The Swan Princess (1994).	July 18, 1997	71 minutes
Tenchi the Movie 2: The Daughter of Darkness 天地無用!真夏のイヴ (Tenchi Muyō! Manatsu no Ibu)	Japan	Tetsu Kimura	Anime International Company; Pioneer LDC; Toei Company	Traditional	Theatrical	Second installment in the Tenchi Muyo! film series.	August 2, 1997	65 minutes
Tiny Heroes; Vacak, az erdő hőse Bobo und die Hasenbande 2 – Abenteuer im Wald	Hungary; Germany; United States	József Gémes; Jenõ Koltai	Pannónia Filmstúdió	Traditional		Sequel to The Seventh Brother (1991).	April 19, 1997	Israel: 76 min. Germany: 78 min.
Tom and Fluffy; Tom ja Fluffy	Estonia	Heiki Ernits; Leo Lätti; Janno Põldma	Eesti Joonisfilm; Yleisradio (YLE)	Traditional		First Estonian animated feature.	May 1997	73 minutes
Twilight of the Dark Master 支配者の黄昏 (Shihaisha no Tasogare)	Japan	Akiyuki Shinbo	Madhouse	Traditional	Direct-to-video; OVA		November 11, 1997 (United States); January 21, 1998 (Japan)	45 minutes
The Ugly Duckling	United Kingdom	David Elvin; Martin Gates	Martin Gates Productions; Carrington Productions International; Fil-Cartoons (animation production facilities)	Traditional			September 13, 1997	81 minutes
Underground Adventure	United States; Canada	Stephen Anderson; Bert Ring; Rhoydon Shishido	Hyperion Pictures	Traditional	Direct-to-video; Compilation film	Sixth compilation film of the animated television series The Oz Kids (1996).	February 18, 1997	64 minutes
Violin in the Starry Sky 星空のバイオリン (Hoshizora no Violin)	Japan	Setsuo Nakayama	Space Eizô; Takahashi Studio	Traditional	Theatrical	Originally first shown at the 1997 Nichieikyo Film Festival.	May 4, 1997	82 minutes

== Highest-grossing animated films of the year ==
Rank	Title	Studio	Worldwide gross	Ref.
1	Hercules	Walt Disney Feature Animation	$252,712,101	
2	Princess Mononoke	Studio Ghibli	$159,375,308 (¥14.5 billion)	
3	Anastasia	Fox Animation Studios	$139,804,348	
4	Doraemon: Nobita and the Spiral City	Asatsu	$17,966,000 (¥2 billion)	
5	Neon Genesis Evangelion: Death & Rebirth	Gainax Co., Ltd.	$16,798,210 (¥1.87 billion)	
6	The End of Evangelion	Gainax Co., Ltd.	$13,025,350 (¥1.45 billion)	
7	Cats Don't Dance	Turner Feature Animation	$3,566,637	

== See also ==
- List of animated television series of 1997
