= List of Tenchi in Tokyo episodes =

Tenchi in Tokyo (Shin Tenchi Muyo! in Japan) is a Japanese animated television series produced by AIC and Pioneer LDC. The series is another retelling of the original Tenchi Muyo! Ryo-Ohki OVAs, like the Tenchi Universe TV series. The show aired on TV Tokyo on April 1 to September 23, 1997. The show was later aired on Cartoon Network's Toonami block from August 25 to September 29, 2000.

== Episodes ==
No.	Title	Original release date	English release date
1	"Separation Anxiety"; Transliteration: "sakura saku / hana no miyako de / URA URARA [Cherry blossoms fall, flower of the capital, ooh la ooh la la]" (Japanese: 桜咲く 華の都で ウラウララ)	April 1, 1997	August 25, 2000
2	"Four's a Crowd"; Transliteration: "enmusubi / kimite wa yubiki no / akai ito [Love knot – decision by a red thread on the little finger]" (Japanese: 縁結び 決め手は小指の 赤い糸)	April 8, 1997	August 28, 2000
3	"Long Distance Lunacy"; Transliteration: "daikonsen / tsutegoto GÊMU wa / RABU GÊMU [Seriously crossed lines – the whisper game is a love game]" (Japanese: 大混線 伝言ゲームは ラブゲーム)	April 15, 1997	August 29, 2000
4	"The Eternal Pledge"; Transliteration: "akogare no / anata to aruku / BÂJIN RÔDO [The yearning to walk down the wedding aisle with you]" (Japanese: あこがれの 貴方と歩く バージンロード)	April 22, 1997	August 30, 2000
5	"Money! Money! Money!"; Transliteration: "kane kasege / sâ KANE kasege / kane kasege [Earn money, come on, earn money, earn money]" (Japanese: 金かせげ さあカネかせげ 金かせげ)	April 29, 1997	August 31, 2000
6	"Play Date"; Transliteration: "saso warete / fushigi no kuni no / meikyû (RABIRINSU) [Invitation, a mysterious place, a labyrinth]" (Japanese: 誘われて ふしぎの国の 迷宮[ラビリンス])	May 6, 1997	September 1, 2000
7	"The Day We Met"; Transliteration: "koi koi to / yobaretaru ka na / uchûsen [Love-love and the calling of a spaceship]" (Japanese: 恋い恋いと 呼ばれたるかな 宇宙船)	May 13, 1997	September 4, 2000
8	"Tenchi Anniversary"; Transliteration: "ki ga tsukeba / anata ga zutto / soba ni ita" (Japanese: 気がつけば 貴方がずっと そばにいた)	May 20, 1997	September 5, 2000
9	"The Guardians of Old"; Transliteration: "ka no chikara / akumu hakobishi / chiga iseki" (Japanese: かの地から 悪夢運びし 地下遺跡)	May 27, 1997	September 6, 2000
10	"Ryoko's Big Date"; Transliteration: "kuchibiru ni / omoi wo takusu / RÛJU ka na [A thought entrusted on your lips – rouge, isn't it?]" (Japanese: くちびるに 想いを託す ルージュかな)	June 3, 1997	September 7, 2000
11	"Moon Mission"; Transliteration: "shikararete / uchû e iede / MYA MYA MYA MYA MYA [Scolded space runaway, meow meow meow meow meow]" (Japanese: しかられて 宇宙へ家出 ミャミャミャミャミャ)	June 10, 1997	September 8, 2000
12	"Stupid Cupid"; Transliteration: "NISE OYAJI / RATIN no RIZUMU de / PAPA iyan [Fake father, Latin rhythm, no Dad!]" (Japanese: ニセオヤジ ラテンのリズムで パパいやん)	June 17, 1997	September 11, 2000
13	"The Eye of the Destroyer"; Transliteration: "gekitotsu no / tsuki to yamiyo to / inazuma to [The moon, the moonless night and a crash of lightning]" (Japanese: 激突の 月と闇夜と 稲妻と)	June 24, 1997	September 12, 2000
14	"Tokyo or Bust!"; Transliteration: "KAttobase / Okayama - Tôkyô / musenryokô [Flying off the handle – hitchhiking from Okayama to Tokyo]" (Japanese: カッとばせ 岡山→東京 無銭旅行)	July 1, 1997	September 13, 2000
15	"Love Match"; Transliteration: "bunkasai / ai no hajimari / heiwa no owari [Culture festival – the beginning of love, the end of peace]" (Japanese: 文化祭 愛の始まり 平和の終わり)	July 8, 1997	September 14, 2000
16	"Carnival!"; Transliteration: "sakura chiru / hana no miyako no / koi moyô [Cherry blossoms fall, flower of the capital, love pattern]" (Japanese: 桜散る 華の都の 恋模様)	July 15, 1997	September 15, 2000
17	"Drifting Away"; Transliteration: "samayotte / sora no kanata ni / Ryôko tatsu [Wandering – Ryoko leaves to wander space]" (Japanese: 彷徨いて 宇宙[そら]の彼方に 魎呼たつ)	July 22, 1997	September 18, 2000
18	"Game Over"; Transliteration: "hanareyuku / kokoro to kokoro / wakare no hi [The day of parting, the separation of hearts and minds]" (Japanese: 離れゆく 心とこころ 別れの日)	July 29, 1997	September 19, 2000
19	"The Lonely Princess"; Transliteration: "tomo chire te / Aeka kokuhaku / todokamu omoi [The parting of friends, Ayeka's confession, an unrequited love]" (Japanese: 友去りて 阿重霞告白 届かぬ想い)	August 5, 1997	September 20, 2000
20	"Old Friends"; Transliteration: "shoku shirazu / MIHO KIYO, DOTABATA / sennyû sôsa [Knowing early summer, Mihoshi and Kiyone sneak noisily in to investigate]" (Japanese: 初夏知らず ミホキヨ、ドタバタ 潜入捜査)	August 12, 1997	September 21, 2000
21	"Real Friends?"; Transliteration: "semi shigure / kanashiki yûgi / yume no ato [An outburst of cicada chirps, sad after a dream of playing]" (Japanese: 蝉時雨 悲しき遊戯 夢の後)	August 19, 1997	September 22, 2000
22	"Sakuya's Secret"; Transliteration: "hanare kite / kokoro samishiki / omoibito [Starting to leave, the lonely, loved one]" (Japanese: 離れ来て 心寂しき 想い人)	August 26, 1997	September 25, 2000
23	"Here, There, and Everywhere"; Transliteration: "natsu honbon / acchi kocchi de / kyû tenkai [Midsummer, all around, a rapid development]" (Japanese: 夏本番 あっちこっちで 急展開)	September 2, 1997	September 26, 2000
24	"Yugi's Shadow"; Transliteration: "kagerô no / gotoki utsutsu no / yumegatari [The account of a dream in a heat and hazy reality]" (Japanese: 陽炎の 如き現[うつつ]の 夢語り)	September 9, 1997	September 27, 2000
25	"The End of Time"; Transliteration: "hana chiramu / kimi sarishi ato / ..... [Scattered cherry blossom petals, after you leave.....]" (Japanese: 花散らむ 君去りし後 ・・・・・)	September 16, 1997	September 28, 2000
26	"Payback"; Transliteration: "daidanen / datte watashi wa / otona da mon <3 [The grand finale, but I am becoming an adult <3]" (Japanese: 大団円! だって私は 大人だもん∇)	September 23, 1997	September 29, 2000

== Home media ==
Tenchi in Tokyo was licensed in the US by Pioneer Entertainment, who released the series on VHS and DVD until ceasing distribution in September 2007. In 2010, Funimation Entertainment announced that a handful of former Geneon titles were licensed including Tenchi in Tokyo. A complete box set was released on November 13, 2012.

North American DVD releases
Vol. #	Title	Release date	Discs	Episode count
1	A New Start	January 12, 1999; January 6, 2004 (Note: Signature Series)	1	4
2	A New Friend	February 16, 1999; April 13, 2004	1	3
3	A New Legend	April 20, 1999; June 8, 2004	1	3
4	A New Enemy	June 15, 1999; August 10, 2004	1	3
5	A New Love	August 24, 1999; October 12, 2004	1	3
6	A New Challenge	October 12, 1999; December 14, 2004	1	3
7	A New Career	November 23, 1999; February 1, 2005	1	3
8	A New Ending	November 23, 1999; March 1, 2005	1	4
N/A	Complete Collection	June 19, 2007	8	26
N/A	The Complete Series	November 13, 2012	4	26
