= List of Clamp School Detectives episodes =

The Clamp School Detectives is a manga series by Clamp, which was adapted into a 26-episode anime series, produced by Bandai Visual and Pierrot. The anime series has been translated and dubbed into English by the anime television network, Animax, who have broadcast the series across its respective English-language networks in Southeast Asia and South Asia. It is distributed in North America by Bandai Entertainment, which first released it in 1998 through now out-of-print subtitled VHS videotapes, and in 2008 re-released DVDs of the series with a new English dub by Coastal Studios.

== Episode list ==
No.	Title	Original release date
1	"The Formation of the CLAMP School Detectives!"; Transliteration: "Kessei! Kuranpu Gakuen Tanteidan" (Japanese: 結成! CLAMP学園探偵団)	May 3, 1997
Tears of a lady spark a new beginning
2	"Sleuths"; Transliteration: "Surūsu" (Japanese: 探偵)	May 10, 1997
Chairman Test
3	"My Fair Lady"; Transliteration: "Mai Fea Rēdi" (Japanese: マイ・フェア・レディ)	May 17, 1997
Beautiful lady smiles after a rainy day
4	"Mr. Chef, Please Beware!"; Transliteration: "Shefu-dono Goyōshin" (Japanese: 料理長殿ご用心)	May 24, 1997
Apple pie of love
5	"The Escape to Victory: Part 1"; Transliteration: "Shōri e no Dasshutsu - Zenpen" (Japanese: 勝利への脱出・前編)	May 31, 1997
How Nokoru and Suoh met three years previously.
6	"The Escape to Victory: Part 2"; Transliteration: "Shōri e no Dasshutsu - Kōhen" (Japanese: 勝利への脱出・後編)	June 7, 1997
Continuing with how Nokoru and Suoh met.
7	"Please Wait Until Dark"; Transliteration: "Kuraku naru made Matte" (Japanese: 暗くなるまでまって)	June 14, 1997
The detectives investigate reports of a ghost in the school's museum.
8	"Notebook of the Ball"; Transliteration: "Butōkai no Techō" (Japanese: 舞踏会の手帳)	June 21, 1997
The detectives investigate the mysterious phone calls and letters they have gotten telling them to shut down the upcoming ball.
9	"You Are Deep in My Heart"; Transliteration: "Waga Kokoro ni Kimi Fukaku" (Japanese: 我が心に君深く)	June 28, 1997
Suoh and Nagisa meet for the first time as he protects her from mysterious attacks.
10	"Pretty League"; Transliteration: "Puriti Rīgu" (Japanese: プリティ・リーグ)	July 5, 1997
Nokoru and Suoh compete in a baseball tournament.
11	"Fashionable Thief: Part 1"; Transliteration: "Oshare Dorobō - Zenpen" (Japanese: おしゃれ泥棒・前編)	July 12, 1997
Another thief is impersonating 20 Faces and it's up to the Clamp School Detectives to figure out who. Also shows how Utako and Akira originally met.
12	"Fashionable Thief: Part 2"; Transliteration: "Oshare Dorobō - Kōhen" (Japanese: おしゃれ泥棒・後編)	July 19, 1997
Another thief is impersonating 20 Faces and it's up to the Clamp School Detectives to figure out who. Akira also struggles with his feelings for Utako.
13	"That's Entertainment"; Transliteration: "Zattsu Entateimento" (Japanese: ザッツ・エンタテイメント)	July 26, 1997
Nokoru has vanished and it's up to Suoh, Akira, Utako, and Nagisa to figure out where he's gone.
14	"The Great Escape"; Transliteration: "Daidassō" (Japanese: 大脱走)	August 2, 1997
Nokoru is kidnapped by Casablanca again.
15	"Once Upon a Time in China"; Transliteration: "Wansu Apon a Taimu in Chaina" (Japanese: ワンス・アポン・ア・タイム・イン・チャイナ)	August 9, 1997
The characters are involved in a play where Akira and Suoh own dueling restaurants.
16	"From This Land to Eternity"; Transliteration: "Koko yori Towa ni" (Japanese: 地上より永遠に)	August 16, 1997
The Detectives, Utako, and Nagisa go on vacation to a tropical island.
17	"Pretty Woman"; Transliteration: "Puriti Ūman" (Japanese: プリティ・ウーマン)	August 23, 1997
The Detectives help a fellow student find her lost ferret.
18	"True Romance"; Transliteration: "Turū Romansu" (Japanese: トゥルー・ロマンス)	August 30, 1997
After an accident Suoh has lost his memory of the past three months including his relationship with Nagisa.
19	"Someday, Somewhere"; Transliteration: "Aru Hi Doko ka de" (Japanese: ある日どこかで)	September 6, 1997
Nokoru finds a treasure hunt in the Student Council Archives and the Detectives travel back and forth across the campus to solve the mystery.
20	"An Elegant Bet"; Transliteration: "Karei naru Kake" (Japanese: 華麗なる賭け)	September 13, 1997
Akira, Suoh, Nagisa, and Utako all receive notes to go to the amusement park which they believe is a prank by Nokoru but Nokoru doesn't have a clue what's going on either.
21	"Grand Illusion"; Transliteration: "Ōinaru Gen'ei" (Japanese: 大いなる幻影)	September 20, 1997
The Detectives continue to investigate who the mysterious hacker is as their pranks get more and more dangerous.
22	"Unforgivable One"; Transliteration: "Yurusarezaru Mono" (Japanese: 許されざる者)	September 27, 1997
The hacker continues to cause trouble around campus and the Detectives start to pursue him more determinedly.
23	"Fake"; Transliteration: "Feiku" (Japanese: フェイク)	October 4, 1997
Nokoru has been so overworked because of the hacker that he has started making sloppy mistakes around campus and decides that he is no longer fit to be president of the student council.
24	"Duelist"; Transliteration: "Dyuerisuto" (Japanese: デュエリスト)	October 11, 1997
Nokoru has returned and Idomu's past is elaborated on.
25	"Subway Panic"; Transliteration: "Sabuwei Panikku" (Japanese: サブウェイ・パニック)	October 18, 1997
Idomu has launched a full out attack against Nokoru and holds the entire Clamp School hostage.
26	"My True Heart to You"; Transliteration: "Magokoro wo Kimi ni" (Japanese: まごころを君に)	October 25, 1997
Idomu's pranks have gone too far now and threaten the entire school. Is this problem too big for even the Clamp School Detectives to solve?
