= List of Ned's Newt episodes =

This is a list of episodes from the animated television series Ned's Newt, which ran from 1997 to 2000 on Teletoon.

== Series overview ==
Season	Episodes	Originally released	
Season	Episodes	First released	Last released
1	13	October 17, 1997	January 9, 1998
2	13	October 6, 1998	January 21, 1999
3	13	September 11, 1999	January 11, 2000

== Episodes ==
The following episodes are listed in order of original broadcast date. Each episode contains two 11-minute shorts.

=== Season 1 (1997–98) ===
No. overall	No. in season	Title	Written by	Original release date
1	1	"Out with the Old, in with the Newt"	Andrew Nicholls and Darrell Vickers	17 October 1997
1	1	"What Rock Through Yonder Window Breaks"	Andrew Nicholls and Darrell Vickers	17 October 1997
"Out with the Old, in with the Newt": Ned goes to the pet store, hoping to buy an elephant, but all he can afford is a listless newt he calls Newton who does nothing but sit in a fishbowl. The pet store owner sells him a can of Zippo for Newt, which turns Newton into a 6-foot, transforming, anthropomorphic newt. Ned and his new pal, Newton, trash the house by playing Tag. Note: This episode serves as the basis of the opening titles of the show. "What Rock Through Yonder Window Breaks": Ned has a crush on the girl across the street, Linda Bliss, but can't talk to her. Newton tries to get her attention by throwing a tiny pebble against Linda's bedroom window while she's asleep, but ends up throwing a rock, and destroys the window. Ned and Newton desperately try to replace it before Linda wakes up the next morning.
2	2	"Nightmare on Friendly Street"	Andrew Nicholls and Darrell Vickers	24 October 1997
2	2	"A Snitch in Time"	Andrew Nicholls and Darrell Vickers	24 October 1997
"Nightmare on Friendly Street": Ned's class is making small floats for the annual Friendly Day Parade, and Newton wants to help. He ends up making an enormous, barge-sized float for Ned and ruins the parade when the float causes massive property damage and sinks in the water. "A Snitch in Time": Ned's tattletale cousin Renfrew comes to visit. He destroys most of Ned's toys and repeatedly tells on Ned. Newton decides to drive Renfrew away by causing a series of ridiculous situations, which causes Renfrew to have a nervous breakdown as he tattles to Ned's parents about them.
3	3	"Voyage to the Bottom of the Dump"	John Pellatt and Kenn Scott	31 October 1997
3	3	"Happy Blood Alter Ring to You"	Issac Levy	31 October 1997
Voyage to the Bottom of the Dump: Ned's father gives Ned a vintage "Captain Ocelot" action figure after his son takes an interest in the show. Ned's mother, however, throws it out, and Ned and Newton have to go to the Friendly Falls Dump to find it again. Afterward, they find out that the dump owner is actually the retired actor who played Captain Ocelot.; Happy Blood Alter Ring to You: Ned's mother wants a 35-carat "Goldina" ring for her birthday, but Newton just insists it's a cheap replica of a sacrifice ring used by a group of Peruvian savages called the Jajamojos. Ned and Newton go to Peru to get the ring, brave the dangers of a temple full of booby traps, and escape being thrown in a volcano.
4	4	"Mars Dilemma"	Andrew Nicholls and Darrell Vickers	7 November 1997
4	4	"Saturday Night Fervour"	Darwin Vickers	7 November 1997
Mars Dilemma: Ned is sent to the grocery store to get a can of tomato paste, but Newton instead suggests they go to Mars, thinking that it's made of tomato paste to correlate with the idea that the moon is made of green cheese. They go to Mars, and it is made of tomato paste! But they find that the tomato paste there tastes awful, so they decide to just get it from the grocery store after all.; Saturday Night Fervour: Ned wants to impress Linda at the school dance, but the town showoff, Rusty McCabe, also wants to impress Linda, and challenges Ned to a dance contest. Ned is completely unable to dance, but he hopes that Newton will be able to tutor him. When that doesn't work, Newton gets the idea to put Ned in a large costume, where he stands on his shoulders while Newton dances.
5	5	"Citizen Ned"	Georgia Pritchett	14 November 1997
5	5	"The Most Grating Show on Earth"	Georgia Pritchett	14 November 1997
Citizen Ned: Ned starts a paper route to save up money for a bike, but Newton has more ambitious plans for him. He turns Ned's paper route into a media empire, making him extremely wealthy, but depressed because he doesn't have time to even ride his new bike. The episode's plot, as well as its title, is a homage to the 1941 film Citizen Kane.; The Most Grating Show on Earth: Ned and Linda go on a date at the circus, after Newton accidentally sells Ned's parents' car to raise the $5 ticket price. The circus turns out to be subpar and unamusing. However, to prevent the date from being a failure, Newton saves the circus by performing a series of astounding circus acts, but also ends up causing the circus animals to stampede through town.
6	6	"Jurassic Joyride"	Stephen Ashton	21 November 1997
6	6	"Take a Hike"	Andrew Nicholls and Darrell Vickers	21 November 1997
Jurassic Joyride: After a fun weekend, Ned says he can't wait for the next one. This gives Newton the idea to build a time machine out of household items so that they can go back to Friday and do the weekend over again. They can't control the machine, however, and it ends up taking them to the Jurassic period, where Ned accidentally stomps on a fly and changes history, causing newts to be the dominant life form on Earth instead of humans. They go back and fix this change, but still have trouble controlling the time machine to take them home, causing them to end up at Gilligan's Island. However, it turns out to be a dream, but the trip to Gilligan's Island was proven to be real.; Take a Hike: Ned attends Boy Scout camp, and Newton notices that the other scouts have more merit badges than Ned. Ned doesn't care, as he's allergic to the outdoors and doesn't enjoy being a Boy Scout, but not wanting to see his owner disgraced, Newton motivates Ned to earn as many merit badges as he can. Eventually, when Ned becomes the most decorated Boy Scout, Newton decides to wrap the entire forest in anti-allergenic plastic, but when he does, Ned finds out that he wasn't allergic to anything in the forest, but to his mother's macadamia-nut cookies that she always packs him.
7	7	"New Improved Zippo"	John Pellatt and Kenn Scott	28 November 1997
7	7	"What Big Rewrite Notes You Have"	Andrew Nicholls and Darrell Vickers	28 November 1997
New Improved Zippo: The company that manufactures Zippo Newt Food has changed the formula, which leaves Newton unable to control his morphing ability. Ned and Newton go to the corporate headquarters to complain, but the president of the company refuses to go back to the old formula until Newton demonstrates that the new formula causes newts to grow six feet tall and change into different forms.; What Big Rewrite Notes You Have: In another attempt to get closer to Linda, Ned plans to audition for a school production of "Little Red Riding Hood". Newton, eager to help out, wants to be cast as the Big Bad Wolf. Unfortunately, the new school drama teacher is an ex-Hollywood executive who makes Ned and Newton repeatedly change the play until it's a post-apocalyptic science fiction story called "Mad Max and the Chicken-Wolf", where Linda isn't even in it.
8	8	"Home Alone with Frank"	Andrew Nicholls and Darrell Vickers	5 December 1997
8	8	"The Lucky Penny"	Andrew Nicholls and Darrell Vickers	5 December 1997
Home Alone with Frank: Ned has been watching too many monster movies, and when he's left in the house alone, he's paranoid that there are monsters around the house. This isn't helped when his parents ask Uncle Frank and several friends of his (on their way to a costume party) to check on him, and they're all dressed as monsters. Newton, after thinking about what killed all the monsters in the movies, decides to let the monsters fall to their deaths by jacking up the house and pushing them out the door.; The Lucky Penny: Ned's father opens a new bank account for Ned, after finding all the change around Ned's room. To Ned's horror, however, that means he has deposited his lucky penny, a treasured penny that has an image of Gene Hackman as Lex Luthor on it. When the bank refuses to get it for him, Newton helps Ned by breaking into the bank vault to find it. They do, but Newton had to give away $3.5 million in the bank vault to make it easier to find. They're saved, however, when a passing coin collector points out that Ned's penny is only one of two in the entire world, worth $3.5 million. Ned and Newton quickly put all the money back in the vault, and the bank owner gives Ned the only other Gene Hackman penny in existence.
9	9	"Help Me, I'm Bald"	Darwin Vickers	12 December 1997
9	9	"Planes, Trains & Newtmobiles"	Andrew Nicholls and Darrell Vickers	12 December 1997
Help Me, I'm Bald: After watching too much television, Newton gets the idea to improve Ned's life with all the things featured in the various commercials he's watched.; Planes, Trains & Newtmobiles: Ned's family is on a long, boring car trip, with only a vehicle bingo game to pass the time. Ned's parents accidentally leave him at a rest stop, however, and Ned needs Newton's help to catch up to them. After being blasted off to Russia, they end up traveling around the world and take every mode of transportation on the bingo card trying to get back, which perplexes Ned's parents.
10	10	"Broken Record"	Terry Saltsman	19 December 1997
10	10	"Newton's Day Out"	Georgia Pritchett	19 December 1997
Broken Record: Local hero Gus Gingrich has held the world's record for "Most Pants Worn at Once" since 1959, until a man in Germany breaks his record, leaving the town heartbroken. Ned and Newton decide to restore the town's spirit by trying to break a record, but Ned fails at each record he tries. Because of this, however, Ned breaks the world record for "Failing at a World Record" according to Newton and restores the town's spirit.; Newton's Day Out: Ned is on a dull field trip at the Friendly Falls Museum of Dusty Old Things, and has to fill out a worksheet of questions about the historical exhibits in the museum. Newton wants to help, but many of the answers he gives are wrong and absurd, such as how Archimedes discovered the bathrobe, and how the Great Wall of China was a backyard fence built by one laborer who couldn't build corners. Ned finds out too late that all the answers are wrong, but Rusty forces him to trade his worksheet with him, assuming that Ned's answers will be better.
11	11	"Can't See the Forest for the Tree Fort"	Karen Malach	26 December 1997
11	11	"Saving Lummox"	Darwin Vickers	26 December 1997
Can't See the Forest for the Tree Fort: Rusty has built a secret clubhouse that he won't let Ned in, so in response, he makes his own secret club in a tree fort. Newton wants to help, though, so they end up building an enormous, five-star clubhouse in the tree, and it becomes the most popular club in town. Rusty begs to be let in, but when Ned does, he accidentally causes the clubhouse to collapse.; Saving Lummox: Ned's friend Doogle has a pet dog, an obese, listless dog named Lummox. Doogle, when overhearing his parents talking about fleas on Lummox's fur, thinks his parents are going to get rid of him, and feeling sympathy for the fellow pet, Newton tries to prove Lummox's worth by setting up a series of situations where Lummox does incredibly useful things for Doogle's family.
12	12	"Newton Falls in Love"	Georgia Pritchett	2 January 1998
12	12	"Show Me the Money"	Hugh Duffy	2 January 1998
Newton Falls in Love: Newton has been acting stranger than usual, and when Ned takes him to see the veterinarian, Newton professes that he has fallen in love with her. As the day goes on, however, he keeps falling in love with dozens of other things, such as a passing roller skater, many different zoo animals, and an ice cube tray. Ned eventually finds out that he's only acting this way because he's shedding his skin.; Show Me the Money: Ned has been entered into a track and field day at school, but he's not happy about it, since Rusty always wins every event. He wins so often, he's even gotten his own theme music, with Yo-Yo Ma as a guest cellist. Newton enters Ned into every single event at the track day, including team sports. Although Rusty wins everything and Ned is exhausted by the end, he's given a special award for being the first person to participate in every single event.
13	13	"One Flu Over the Cuckoo's Nest"	John Pellatt and Kenn Scott	9 January 1998
13	13	"Mall Good Things Come to an End"	Stephen Ashton	9 January 1998
One Flu Over the Cuckoo's Nest: Ned's parents have the flu, and want Ned to do the day's chores. Newton tries to help to get them done faster, but he ends up being incredibly destructive.; Mall Good Things Come to an End: The local mall is holding a contest where the first person to guess how many jellybeans are in a jar will win a drivable toy car. Ned wants the car, but when Newton comes out, he wreaks havoc around the mall and causes him and Ned to be locked inside after it closes. The sadistic mall security guard wants to ban them from the mall, but they're able to blackmail him when they find out that he's been counting the jellybeans in the jar, one by one, to win the toy car. To keep them quiet, the mall cop gives them the car.

=== Season 2 (1998–99) ===
No. overall	No. in season	Title	Written by	Original release date
14	1	"Live and Let Dad"	Andrew Nicholls and Darrell Vickers	6 October 1998
14	1	"Ned's Army"	Andrew Nicholls and Darrell Vickers	6 October 1998
Live and Let Dad: Ned goes with his dad on Take Your Child to Work Day, and while he initially thinks his dad's job is dull, he eventually thinks that his dad is a government spy, and tries to find out more information.; Ned's Army: When Ned complains that he can't go to summer camp, Newton mistakenly thinks he's describing boot camp. He signs Ned up for the army, and while no one notices that he's 10 years old and insists he does basic training, Newton tries to find a way to get him out.
15	2	"Climb Every Newton"	Andrew Nicholls and Darrell Vickers	21 October 1998
15	2	"Go Nest Young Man"	Andrew Nicholls and Darrell Vickers	21 October 1998
Climb Every Newton: Ned decides to climb a small hill to raise money for charity, but Newton thinks he would raise more if he climbed Mount Everest, so he takes Ned there and helps him climb it.; Go Nest Young Man: Winter is coming, and Newton learns that newts hibernate during the winter, a process he doesn't want to go through. When he learns that birds migrate instead, he decides to go away for the winter and takes Ned along.
16	3	"Weekend at Bernice"	Andrew Nicholls and Darrell Vickers	4 November 1998
16	3	"New Year's Ned"	Andrew Nicholls and Darrell Vickers	4 November 1998
Weekend at Bernice: Ned and his family are all set to spend a weekend in exciting Gamble City, but when Ned's mother finds out there's gambling there, she decides to have Ned stay with his aunt and uncle instead, who are a depressed, puritanical Eastern European couple who think fun is unhealthy. As Ned and Newton become more and more bored, Newton decides to have the whole house shipped to Gamble City.; New Year's Ned: Ned was born on New Year's Day, and as such, is expected to play Baby New Year every year at a New Year's Eve pageant. He doesn't want to do it at his age, so he desperately tries to find out if another New Year's Baby has been born in the town, saving him the embarrassment.
17	4	"Lights, Camera, Newton"	Andrew Nicholls and Darrell Vickers	18 November 1998
17	4	"When in Drought"	Darwin Vickers	18 November 1998
Lights, Camera, Newton: Ned's been given a small role in the horror film "Car-Driving Trees of Egstappa Part 2", but soon finds out that the Car-Driving Trees are real, and plan to wipe out Friendly Falls.; When in Drought: Friendly Falls is experiencing a drought, which is ruining Ned's summer, and might cause trouble for the various newts in town when the ponds and rivers they live in dry up. Newton tries to end the drought with various plans to make it rain, and he succeeds, even though it has been raining so much the town floods anyaway.
18	5	"Draw Your Own Concussion"	Terry Saltsman	25 November 1998
18	5	"Tis Follicle to Be Wise"	Andrew Nicholls and Darrell Vickers	25 November 1998
Draw Your Own Concussion: Ned gets a mild concussion, but eventually gets to play outside. It goes horribly awry when Ned is sent to the hospital thanks to one of Newton's forms calling the ambulance, even though he's actually feeling fine. Following this, Newton in his non-shapeshifting form takes it on his own to nurse Ned back to health.; Tis Follicle to Be Wise: Ned and his friends are collecting 10,000 bags of pet hair for charity, but Ned's cousin Renfrew wants to sabotage their efforts. Newton will have none of it, so he attempts to get Renfrew off their case.
19	6	"Back to the Futile"	John Pellatt and Kenn Scott	2 December 1998
19	6	"Motley Cruise"	Andrew Nicholls and Darrell Vickers	2 December 1998
Back to the Futile: The Friendly Falls Future Fair has been reopened after it was closed in 1964, which makes Ned excited. The lineup to get into the fair is huge, though, so Newton sneaks him in so they can see the exhibits. Ned is dismayed to see that they haven't been updated since its closure, and most of the displays are ridiculous: there's a car with a record player mounted on the dashboard for a "car stereo system", a kitchen where malfunctioning robots cook food, and even robotic pets (much to Newton's shock). He goes back to his parents just as they get to the front of the line, and says he doesn't want to visit the fair anymore.; Motley Cruise: Ned comes with his parents on their anniversary cruise, but thanks to Newton, he ends up on the wrong boat.
20	7	"Take Your Picnic"	Georgia Pritchett	9 December 1998
20	7	"Crop! In the Name of Love"	Darwin Vickers	9 December 1998
Take Your Picnic: At Ned's family picnic, Newton develops amnesia, and thinks he is one of Ned's obnoxious uncles.; Crop! In the Name of Love: Ned visits his grandparents, who are retired farmers. Newton, who doesn't know what retirement is, thinks the animals and crops are simply being lazy and tries to whip them into shape.
21	8	"Abode to Ruin"	Darwin Vickers	16 December 1998
21	8	"Educating Reeger"	John Pellatt and Kenn Scott	16 December 1998
Abode to Ruin: Ned's mother goes to a different town to participate in a perfume saleswoman convention, but Ned mistakenly thinks that they are moving to this town. To convince Ned's parents that they shouldn't move there, Newton poses as a tour guide to describe various "horrors" throughout the town, and tries to make it seem as though wild boars roam the streets by putting boar masks on the stray dogs.; Educating Reeger: Ned's teacher has developed a new alphabetical desk arrangement, which unfortunately puts Ned in the back of the class, and Linda at the front. Because he wants to be able to sit right behind her, Ned and Newton arrange various schemes to make sure the few kids in between Ned and Linda get taken out of class, either by moving, being transferred, having their last names changed, or graduating. But at the end, when it looks like Ned and Linda get to sit with each other, Ned's teacher grabs him away from Linda and introduces him to two pairs of identical twins named Jenny, Kenny, Penny, and Lenny, who are told to sit between Ned and Linda, much to his disappointment.
22	9	"Norman's Newt"	Georgia Pritchett	23 December 1998
22	9	"The Show Must Go Off"	Andrew Nicholls and Darrell Vickers	23 December 1998
Norman's Newt: Ned is made to play with his obnoxious rich cousin, Norman, who has a female pet newt. When Ned feeds both Newton and the other newt Zippo food, they both change, and Norman's newt wants revenge on Norman for constantly neglecting him. Newton falls for the female newt, whom he names Buttercup, and Norman is terrified by the two giant creatures that have suddenly appeared.; The Show Must Go Off: While Ned is working at a TV station, Newton accidentally destroys all of the station's pre-recorded content for the weekend, and he and Ned have to record all-new footage to replace it. They re-enact the news, several TV shows, and try to splice in whatever spare footage they can find to fill time.
23	10	"If the Shoe Gives You Fits"	Andrew Nicholls and Darrell Vickers	31 December 1998
23	10	"Ned and Edna, and Ed 'n Aden"	Maureen Paxton	31 December 1998
If the Shoe Gives You Fits: When Ned's parents hear him talking about Newton, they assume this is a new imaginary friend, similar to one Ned had in his early childhood, a big, talking, red shoe named Shoe. They take Ned to see a child psychiatrist, but when they accidentally see Newton (who has been going out and around in the form of a shoe since he found out about Shoe), and assume that Ned's imaginary friend is visible to them as well, they also go and see a psychiatrist. In the end, it turns out Shoe is real.; Ned and Edna, and Ed 'n Aden: Ned notices that his alphabet soup is missing the letters N, E, and D. Curious as to why, he goes to the company that makes the soup, which turns out to be the same one that makes the Zippo Newt Food, to find out what's going on.
24	11	"Fantastic Neddage"	John Mein	7 January 1999
24	11	"A Mother Day, A Mother Dollar"	Andrew Nicholls and Darrell Vickers	7 January 1999
Fantastic Neddage: Ned has a cold, and Newton shrinks himself down so he can enter Ned's body and cure him. The plot and title of this episode are an homage to the Isaac Asimov story and the film Fantastic Voyage.; A Mother Day, A Mother Dollar: With Mother's Day approaching, Newton thinks the purpose of the holiday is to give your mother as a gift. He finds his mother and proceeds to give her to Ned.
25	12	"Newt York, Newt York"	Della Sakal	14 January 1999
25	12	"Lummox of the Baskervilles"	Allan Daniels	14 January 1999
Newt York, Newt York: Ned's parents are planning a trip to New York City, but have to cancel it when they hear, from Doogle's parents, that they've been watching a show about the urban legend that alligators live in the sewers. Ned and Newton go there to prove that the rumor is false, mainly trying to blend in with the locals. But they end up falling into the sewers when they're ready to give up, and also accidentally find the sewer alligators.; Lummox of the Baskervilles: Instead of a lemonade stand, Newton convinces Ned to start up a private detective service. Linda hires him to find her missing earring, and Doogle hires him to find his missing dog, Lummox. Ned eventually finds out that Lummox was accidentally made into a professional baseball pitcher, and then tries to find a way to get him out of the Major Leagues. The title is a reference to a Sherlock Holmes story, The Hound of the Baskervilles.
26	13	"Frankenvine"	Della Sakal	21 January 1999
26	13	"Nedapalooza"	Darwin Vickers	21 January 1999
Frankenvine: Ned rescues an endangered plant for a science fair entry, but the plant soon starts to grow too much and threatens to take over the world.; Nedapalooza: Newton helps Ned and Linda win tickets to a rock concert, but their date is ruined when Doogle, while digging a hole to raise money for charity, accidentally unearths a race of subterranean trolls bent on taking over the world's metropolises, and Ned and Newton have to stop them.

=== Season 3 (1999–2000) ===
No. overall	No. in season	Title	Written by	Original release date
27	1	"Diary of a Nedman"	Andrew Nicholls and Darrell Vickers	11 September 1999
27	1	"Last Fraction Hero"	Andrew Nicholls and Darrell Vickers	11 September 1999
Diary of a Nedman: Ned has started keeping a diary, but his entries are very typical and boring. To spice it up, Newton starts causing increasingly exciting things to happen in Ned's life so that he will have more to put in his diary.; Last Fraction Hero: Ned's class has started learning fractions, which Ned has difficulty with. To help him grasp the concept, Newton splits himself across the middle, but his lower half develops a mind of its own and tries to run away.
28	2	"Carnival Knowledge"	Andrew Nicholls and Darrell Vickers	25 September 1999
28	2	"Go Fetch"	Andrew Nicholls and Darrell Vickers	25 September 1999
Carnival Knowledge: The carnival is in town, and Ned wants to take Linda to it. He's terrible at most of the carnival games, however, and Rusty beats him at all of them. Ned finds out later, though, that Rusty's uncle owns the carnival, and has rigged all the games to take the visitors' money and let Rusty win every time.; Go Fetch: Ned sends in 20 cereal box tops to get a "Captain Ocelot Crypto-Claw" toy, but when it doesn't come for eight weeks, Newton decides to go and find it. After going through the company that makes it, they find out each of the toys is manufactured by a goat named Inchina, and the box tops are meant to feed her as she makes each toy, which takes up to eight weeks.
29	3	"Xylophone Camp"	Andrew Nicholls and Darrell Vickers	2 October 1999
29	3	"The Friendly Triangle"	Andrew Nicholls and Darrell Vickers	2 October 1999
Xylophone Camp: Ned is excited to go to xylophone camp, but is dismayed to find out that no one there actually plays the xylophone, and that it's meant to be a camp for all the kids that couldn't get into fun camps. After seeing that everyone is wasting their time on an electronic toy called the "Battery Drainer" because of its flashy commercial, Ned decides to create his own commercial to get the other kids interested in playing the xylophone.; The Friendly Triangle: Ned has to do a local history project for school, but all of the good topics are taken. He soon finds out about the Friendly Triangle, an area in town where things allegedly disappear. He gets several eyewitness accounts of paranormal events in the Triangle, but when he tries to investigate them, he finds out all of his witnesses were just from a family with very poor eyesight that lost their things, and that the Friendly Triangle isn't real.
30	4	"Never Never Ned"	Andrew Nicholls and Darrell Vickers	9 October 1999
30	4	"To Have and Have Newt"	Darwin Vickers	9 October 1999
Never Never Ned: Newton is worried that when Ned grows up, he will get rid of him. When he learns about the story of Peter Pan, however, he decides to take Ned to Neverland, where he won't grow up. Through a comedy of errors, however, Ned and Newton instead uncover an unlicensed video distribution operation.; To Have and Have Newt: Rusty is well-known around town as a snobby rich boy, but when Ned's photos get mixed up with Rusty's at the photo booth, Ned finds out that Rusty's family is broke. At first intending to disgrace him, Linda instead convinces him to be sympathetic, and people start donating things to Rusty's family. They later find out that these photos were from a theme park called "Live Like Ordinary People Land", where rich people pretend to be poor.
31	5	"Summer Rental"	Andrew Nicholls and Darrell Vickers	6 November 1999
31	5	"The Man Who Would Be Flemking"	Mike Cullen	6 November 1999
Summer Rental: Ned's parents both go up to a cottage in the mountains owned by Renfrew's parents for some "peace". Renfrew's parents, unfortunately, are Foley artists, and decide to catch up on some work while they're there. Things are made worse when Ned has to deal with Renfrew some more and gets lost in the woods while trying to re-enact the stories of fictional nature hero Woodsy Foreston.; The Man Who Would Be Flemking: While Ned's family is at the beach, a message in a bottle washes ashore from Ned's long-lost Uncle Sandy. Ned and Newton decide to go rescue him, and get swallowed by a whale, encounter sirens, and get caught in a maelstrom before finding him. It turns out that he helped to invent the microchip, and as such, is a multi-billionaire.
32	6	"Cyranewt de Bergerac"	Darwin Vickers	7 November 1999
32	6	"The Boy Who Newt Too Much"	Keith McWilliams	7 November 1999
Cyranewt de Bergerac: Ned signs up for the school debate team to be closer to Linda, even though he's bad at public speaking. Newton helps him by passing him notes, and Ned becomes the school debate champion. He's so good, in fact, that he successfully debates in favor of the town mayor's ridiculous plan to replace all of Friendly Falls' streets with canals to ease pollution.; The Boy Who Newt Too Much: While recording an episode of "Ninja Fish From the Outback", Ned accidentally records a secret message after Newton does some "modifications" to Ned's television antenna. Ned's parents accidentally return the tape to the video store and are abducted and interrogated. Ned and Newton are sent on a mission of international espionage to recover the tape, find out its meaning, and rescue Ned's parents.
33	7	"Nedding Bells Are Ringing"	John Mein	20 November 1999
33	7	"Newt's Ned"	John Pellatt and Kenn Scott	20 November 1999
Nedding Bells Are Ringing: When Newton overhears Ned rehearsing his lines as a ring bearer at a family member's wedding, he mistakenly thinks Ned is going to marry someone other than Linda. He takes it upon himself to ruin the wedding, not knowing that it's not Ned who's getting married.; Newt's Ned: After a freak accident, Ned and Newton switch bodies. They have to try to act like each other until they can switch back, but this is harder than it sounds.
34	8	"Rear Bus Window"	Andrew Nicholls and Darrell Vickers	14 November 1999
34	8	"Et Tu, Newté?"	Darwin Vickers	14 November 1999
Rear Bus Window: While on a field trip to the zoo, Ned and Newton decide to go to the bus through the emergency exit in the back. However, they find out that this door is actually a portal to a parallel universe, where the bus is parked in a lot of identical buses. They have to find the right one to get back home.; Et Tu, Newté?: Ned's parents are holding a costume party, but Newton accidentally puts the invitations in a wood chipper after Ned was supposed to mail them, so no one is coming. To make up for his mistake, Newton uses the time machine he built to gather several historical figures as party guests, including Cleopatra, Napoleon and Joséphine, and Bonnie and Clyde.
35	9	"Love Is a Many Salamandered Thing"	Stephen Ashton	27 November 1999
35	9	"Trouble Indemnity"	Andrew Nicholls and Darrell Vickers	27 November 1999
Love Is a Many Salamandered Thing: Ned takes Linda to a sad romance film, Amour Amour Amour, and wants to take her to another one since the date was such a success. Newton gets an idea where he gets Ned's parents to dress as the film's characters while they go furniture shopping, and tells Ned that Amour Amour Amour 2 has been released the next day. Ned and Linda sit in a box that Newton pulls and drops to each floor of the department store his parents are at, and dubs over them to make it look like the film.; Trouble Indemnity: Ned's parents lose all their money on a crooked insurance policy to insure several "valuable" things around their house, including a Gene Wilder bedroom mirror and a broken "unbreakable" vinyl record. This policy will only pay out if a series of impossible things damage these items, so Ned and Newton work together to destroy these items in impossible ways, get the money back, and thoroughly confuse the crooked saleswoman.
36	10	"312 Angry Women"	John Pellatt and Kenn Scott	4 December 1999
36	10	"Toys Will Be Toys"	Andrew Nicholls and Darrell Vickers	4 December 1999
312 Angry Women: Ned has invited two girls, Linda and a new girl, to the grand opening of the Friendly Falls Aquarium. Newton notices that Ned is anxious about this, and comes to the conclusion that it's because he's lonely. To help him out, he invites 310 more girls to keep Ned company. The title is a reference to the play and film Twelve Angry Men.; Toys Will Be Toys: Ned gets a virtual pet toy, which makes Newton jealous. Soon, though, Newton finds out that the toy has artificial intelligence and intends to conquer the world. He tries to convince Ned that the toy is evil, but he doesn't believe him, assuming that he's gotten more jealous. It's up to Newton to defeat the evil virtual pet on his own.
37	11	"Summer Gone, Summer Not"	Alan Daniels	11 December 1999
37	11	"Sealed with a Newt"	Keith McWilliams	11 December 1999
Summer Gone, Summer Not: Ned is excited to be starting summer vacation, but is dismayed to find that July and August are missing out on the free gas station calendars everyone in town has, which leads the entire town to think that they're skipping summer this year. Ned and Newton decide to investigate the missing months and find out that it's because the calendar publisher has lost the two artists that paint the banal scenes for July and August that go in the calendar. Ned and Newton have them quickly replaced, and summer is saved.; Sealed with a Newt: Ned's mother is hosting a Snapperware party, and Newton accidentally gets sealed in one of the containers and shipped away. Ned tries to find where the container has gone before it's too late.
38	12	"The Tooth Is Out There"	John Mein	18 December 1999
38	12	"Remote Possibility"	Mike Cullen	18 December 1999
The Tooth Is Out There: Ned has lost a tooth, and leaves it under his pillow for the Tooth Fairy. When the fairy comes, though, Newton thinks he's a burglar and attacks him. This results in the Tooth Fairy cursing Ned to have giant teeth, and Ned can only have the curse lifted if he does several tasks for the Fairy, such as counting all the newts in the world and doing his laundry.; Remote Possibility: It's time for the annual Friendly Falls Scavenger Hunt, which is mostly so that the town mayor doesn't have to do shopping once a year. Rusty is the favorite to win, but when Newton sees a rainbow, he thinks he'll find a pot of gold at the end. They do find the pot, but instead of gold, there's a universal remote that actually affects the universe, being able to pause time, make things go faster or slower, and so forth. Ned and Newton use it to thwart Rusty's victory, but each button only works once, so they need to get creative. They're about to win the scavenger hunt when a group of leprechauns demand the remote back and hit the rewind button, rewinding the episode all the way back to the beginning.
39	13	"Regattadämerang"	Andrew Nicholls and Darrell Vickers	11 January 2000
39	13	"All's Well That Hens Well"	Darwin Vickers	11 January 2000
Regattadämerang: Ned has been made the coxswain of the Friendly Falls rowing team in a regatta against the neighboring town of Carty Garbageton, a filthy town founded by janitors and gas station attendants. Friendly Falls traditionally beats Carty Garbageton by coming in second-last. Their "winning" streak is in trouble, though, when Friendly Falls loses all its money sponsoring a start-up company to sell smoke and soot from the town's old chimney factory. Many of the townspeople have to do menial work in Carty Garbageton to make the money back, but they're all fired when the town starts becoming clean. Ned then gets the idea to sell the soot to Carty Garbageton, and the town makes all its money back just in time for Friendly Falls to not come in last at the regatta.; All's Well That Hens Well: Ned is showing a health science project to his class that could make or break his passing grade: a film he's made to show where food comes from. The film is extremely strange, however, because of the various roles Newton plays in it, from the Hard-Boiled Chicken, source of the world's hard-boiled eggs, to the Imitation Crab, source of the world's imitation crab meat. Ned's project is initially doomed because of Newton's involvement, but Ned's teacher thinks that it was actually a creative writing project that was due the following week, for which he gets an A+. She wonders where his health science project is, and the episode ends with Ned saying "I'll be right back", and leaving the classroom.
