= Tenchi in Tokyo =

Japanese anime television series

- Genre: Adventure; Fantasy; Harem
- Based on: Tenchi Muyo! by Masaki Kajishima
- Written by: Mayori Sekijima
- Directed by: Yoshihiro Takamoto
- Voices of: Masami Kikuchi; Ai Orikasa; Yumi Takada; Mayumi Iizuka
- Opening theme: "Where Have My Dreams Gone" by Linda Yamamoto
- Ending theme: "Can't Stop! Can't Stop!" by Masami Kikuchi, Yumi Takada, Yuko Mizutani, Ai Orikasa, Etsuko Kozakura, Chisa Yokoyama, Yuri Amano, and Yuko Kobayashi
- Composer: Shunsuke Kikuchi
- Country of origin: Japan
- Original language: Japanese
- No. of episodes: 26 (list of episodes)

Production
- Producers: Kazuaki Morijiri; Shinjiro Yokoyama; Yumi Murase
- Animator: AIC
- Running time: 24 minutes

Original release
- Network: TXN (TV Tokyo)
- Release: April 1 – September 23, 1997

Tenchi in Tokyo (新・天地無用!, Shin Tenchi Muyō!; literally The New No Need for Tenchi!) is a Japanese anime television series animated by AIC and aired on TV Tokyo from April 1 to September 23, 1997. It is the third installation of the Tenchi Muyo! line of series, preceding Tenchi Muyo! GXP and succeeding Tenchi Universe. The show was localized in North America by Geneon Entertainment and aired on Cartoon Network's Toonami block from August 25 to September 29, 2000.

The opening theme was "Where Have My Dreams Gone" (「夢はどこへいった」; Yume wa doko e itta) sung by Linda Yamamoto. The ending theme was "Can't Stop! Can't Stop!" (「やめられない やめられない」; Yamerarenai Yamerarenai), sung by the cast, and Episode 24 had its own ending theme, "Unrequited Love" (「かたおもい」; Kataomoi) sung by Mayumi Iizuka.

== Plot ==
Tenchi in Tokyo begins when Tenchi Masaki relocates to Tokyo to apprentice at a Shinto shrine. He meets a new love interest, Sakuya Kumashiro, who is a classmate of his at his new school. Much of the series revolves around the development of Tenchi's and Sakuya's relationship and its effect on the girls back in Okayama. Unlike the preceding series in the franchise (Tenchi Muyo! Ryo-Ohki and Tenchi Universe), neither Tenchi nor his family have any connection to Jurai whatsoever in this series.

In this continuity, the girls meet Tenchi on Earth because of one incident that takes place two years prior to the series. At that time, Ryoko and Washu stole a crystal from Jurai and fled towards Earth, pursued by Ayeka, Sasami, Ryo-Ohki, and the Guardians in Ayeka's ship, and Mihoshi and Kiyone in a Galaxy Police ship. They are all injured when Ryoko consumes Ayeka's crystal and becomes a monster. Tenchi defeats the monster when a necklace he is wearing (a memento of his mother) turns into a sword. During the anniversary party for this event at Tenchi's home, it is revealed that each of the girls has a crystal from the necklace as a token of their bond with Tenchi, which they each took after Ryoko broke Tenchi's necklace apart.

The main antagonist is Yugi, a mutant Juraian who was sealed away on Earth 3500 years ago when she almost destroyed Jurai by its ruler, Empress Hinase. She intends to take over the Earth by turning it into her own kingdom, much as she tried with Jurai. In order for her plans to succeed, she must break the bonds that hold the Masaki family together. Because, in this continuity, the Masakis are defenders of Earth. They perform this function with the power in the crystals, but the crystals need to be in proximity to one another for them to be able to function. Yugi executes her plan partly through her henchmen, such as Hotsuma, who convinces Ryoko to leave Earth with him, but also by forming a genuine friendship with Sasami through one of her projections, also named Yugi. When Yugi's plan comes to fruition, it is revealed that Sakuya, too, is nothing more than another projection of Yugi, designed to scatter the Masaki family.

Yugi tries to get Tenchi to abandon reality and stay in a pocket universe with Sakuya, but Sakuya herself tells Tenchi to leave. When he does, the crystals summon the girls to him, and Tenchi is able to defeat Yugi. Yugi is then sealed away (at her own request) until she becomes a good person.

== Cast ==
There are characters common to all of the Tenchi Muyo franchise who appear in this series, and others who are particular to this series. (Note: The backstories of the characters, however, are different, and particularly, their last names are never given in dialogue or in credits for this series.)

=== Franchise recurrent ===
- Tenchi Masaki: The central character and love interest for almost all of the female characters. Voiced by: Masami Kikuchi (Japanese); Matt K. Miller (English).
- Ayeka – The First Princess of Jurai. Voiced by: Yumi Takada (Japanese); Jennifer Darling (English).
- Sasami – Ayeka's younger sister. Voiced by: Chisa Yokoyama (Japanese); Sherry Lynn (English).
- Ryo-Ohki – In this continuity, she is Sasami's pet and transforms into a giant robot. Voiced by: Etsuko Kozakura (Japanese); Debi Derryberry (English).
- Ryoko – A space pirate who stole the "Light of Jurai" from Jurai. Voiced by: Ai Orikasa (Japanese); Petrea Burchard (English).
- Washu – A genius who is Ryoko's partner. Voiced by: Yuko Kobayashi (Japanese); Kate Vogt (English).
- Kiyone – Detective First Class in the Galaxy Police, and Mihoshi's partner. Voiced by: Yuri Amano (Japanese); Wendee Lee (English).
- Mihoshi – A clumsy Galaxy Police member and Kiyone's partner. Voiced by: Yuko Mizutani (Japanese); Rebecca Forstadt (English).
- Nobuyuki Masaki – Tenchi's father. Voiced by: Takeshi Aono (Japanese); Bob Papenbrook (English).
- Katsuhito Masaki – Tenchi's grandfather. Voiced by: Takeshi Aono (Japanese); Bob Papenbrook (English).
- Azaka – One of Ayeka's two Guardians. Voiced by: Kenichi Ogata (Japanese); Doug Stone (English).
- Kamidake – The other of Ayeka's Guardians. Voiced by: Wataru Takagi (Japanese); Michael Sorich (English).
- Amagasaki – Tenchi's classmate at his school in Tokyo.
- Tsuchida – Tenchi's classmate at his school in Tokyo. In this continuity, his first name is Umanosuke, and he is the grandson of the head priest Tenchi apprentices under during the series.

=== Exclusive to this series ===
- Sakuya Kumashiro – Tenchi's love interest. Voiced by: Mayumi Iizuka (Japanese); Julie Maddalena (English).
- Yugi – The main antagonist. Voiced by: Akiko Yajima (Japanese); Debi Derryberry (English).
- Hotsuma – Yugi's henchman. Voiced by: Wataru Takagi (Japanese); Matt K. Miller (English).
- Matori – Yugi's henchman. Voiced by: Yuriko Yamaguchi (Japanese); Julie Maddalena (English).
- Tsugaru – Yugi's henchman. Voiced by: Masamichi Ota (Japanese); Richard Cansino (English).
- Yu-Ohki – Yugi's henchman, an analogue to Ryo-Ohki.

== Reception ==
Tenchi in Tokyo was met with mixed reviews. Animefringe.com cited a "horribly weak plot" and that "what makes the TV series almost unbearable to watch are the new character designs and the frequent use of super deformed animation... You'll either love it or hate it." Animeworld.com gave the show a similarly moderate 2.5 out of 5 stars, claiming that although "[it] is yet another very funny Tenchi series with all the great characters and bizarre situations...", "They don't bother explaining the entirely new backstories until a bit into it" and that "[it's] either terribly lazy or shamelessly commercial that they couldn't even be bothered to cook up some new character designs and reestablish the stereotypes for a new story."

Industry aggregator Mania.com awarded all of the North American DVD releases an A average, citing that although "Tenchi in Tokyo is a bit more of a departure from the tried and true formula of the past", "[the] show is definitely a welcomed addition in this household."
