= Flitze Feuerzahn =

- Country of origin: Czech Republic; Luxembourg
- No. of seasons: 1
- No. of episodes: 6

Production
- Running time: 25 minutes

Original release
- Release: 1992 – 1996

Flitze Feuerzahn (eng. Flitze Firetooth) was primarily a Radio Play, that was produced from the Radio Play Label Europa in the years 1964 to 1987. The Stories about the little green Dragon come from the pen of Matthias Riehl. There were also some merchandising products such as soft toys, books, notebooks and an animated series.

== Content ==
Flitze Feuerzahn is a Dragon Child, that were left behind by its parents, cause it don't got wings and can only breathe a little fire from one tooth. From then on he lives abandoned in the forest. On one Day he gets to know the Raven Raps, with whom he has many adventures, mostly in the human world.

== Cast ==
The speakers for the radio play series were:

- Flitze Feuerzahn, the little green dragon - voiced by Eckart Dux.
- Rabe Raps (eng: Raven Raps) - voiced by Astrid Kollex.
- Kapt'n Buddelmann (eng: Captain Digger) an old sailor and the most important human reference person - voiced by Henning Schlüter.
- Witwe Kraft (eng: Widow strength), the usually very skeptical, but nevertheless lovable landlady of Captain Digger - voiced by Annemarie Marks-Rocke.
- Narrator was Hans Paetsch

There are also some recurring characters, such as Jakob and Stefanie (great-nephew and great-niece of Captain Digger, voiced by Manuel and Sandra Portela), the spa director Sonnenschein (eng: Sunshine) (changing speakers, mostly Günter König), the Dentist Dr. Brückengold (eng: Bridge gold) (Utz Richter)the Roebuck Renner (eng: Runner) (Andreas von der Meden) the Bunny Hurtig (eng: Brisk)(Renate Pichler)the Ranger Redlich (eng: Honest)(Franz-Josef Steffens) and some others. Usually these are either close friends from the human or animal world. Most of the time, the action takes place in only one of the worlds within an episode. Mixing rarely takes place, although linguistic communication between humans and animals is possible.

== Production and release of the radio play ==
A total of 30 radio play episodes and a special Easter episode, each lasting around 30 minutes, were produced from 1984 onwards. It was directed by Heikedine Körting, the artistic director was Dr. Beurmann. The production of further episodes was stopped in 1988. The series appeared on the radio play label Europa, some episodes were re-released on Dino Music.

== Episodes ==
1. Verwirrung im Zoo (Confusion in the Zoo)
2. Auf Horchposten (On listening post)
3. Die dicke Backe (The fat cheek)
4. In der Falle (In the trap)
5. Ein heißer Wintertag (A Hot Winter Day)
6. Die Geisterstunde (The witching hour)
7. Ausgekocht (Cunning)
8. In der Geisterbahn (In the Ghost Train)
9. Seemannsgarn (Sailor's yarn)
10. Der Traum vom Fliegen (The Dream of Flying)
11. Gefährliche Reise (Dangerous Trip)
12. Ein Hilferuf (A cry for help)
13. Zwei Räuber im Wald (Two robbers in the forest)
14. Sprünge am Heiligabend (Jumps on Christmas Eve)
15. Die Tarnkappe (The magic hat)
16. Gestörter Fernsehabend (Disturbed television evening)
17. Der Schatz der Amelungen (The treasure of the Amelungen)
18. Flinke Pfleger (Nimble carers)
19. Du armer Wolf (You poor Wolf)
20. Theater und Müll (Theatre and Trash)
21. Gesang im Mondschein (Singing in the moonlight)
22. Loch im Ballon (Hole in the balloon)
23. Zur Drachenhöhle (To the dragon's cave)
24. Auf dem Feuerstuhl (On the Motorbike)
25. Knall im Bad (Bang in the bathroom)
26. Die kürzeste Nacht (The Shortest Night)
27. Das Kostümfest (The costume party)
28. Im finsteren Loch (In the dark hole)
29. als Sportkanone (as jock)
30. Notsignal auf See (Distress signal at sea)
- Sonderfolge: Schöne Osterüberraschung (Special episode: Nice Easter surprise)

== TV series ==
Alpha-Film GmbH produced a cartoon series with six episodes under the direction of Milos Hlavac. David Howard wrote the scripts. The series was released on VHS in Germany in April 1997 and January 1998. It was only then that it was broadcast on television for the first time.

== See also ==
- List of German television series
