= Interbang =

Italian television series

Interbang‽ is an Italian television series created by Paul Casalini which prominently featured the interbang or interrobang symbol (‽), a combination of the exclamation point and the question mark.

In Italy it was broadcast on Odeon TV. In the UK the show was broadcast on The Children's Channel in the late 1980s and on the Terrestrial Channel ITV.

The series featured two teenagers, Gianni and Bruno, who were trying to collect a number of special souvenir statues of the Pisa Leaning Tower, scattered all across the world, whilst trying to prevent a group of criminals also getting their hands on the statues. Each statue granted its holder a different magical ability. Each episode a different statue would be recovered by one of the opposing sides, with each statue displaying a different coloured version of an interrobang.

== Characters ==
Gianni
An Italian student who is trying to collect the statues for "The Professor."
Bruno
An Italian student who is trying to collect the statues for "The Professor."
The Killer
An incompetent hitman who is trying to collect the statues for "The Boss." He is known for wearing black.
The Boss
An Italian mobster who hired The Killer. Eventually, he kidnaps and tortures the professor to find out where the statues are hidden.
The Professor
A lecturer who sends Gianni and Bruno on their quest. He originally hid the statues and wrote the clues that lead to their location. He is hospitalized and can't collect them himself. Later, he is kidnapped by The Boss.
Marilyn
The Boss's secretary and Marilyn Monroe look-alike.
The Mysterious Woman
She regularly rescues the boys from the Killer, but disappears again almost immediately after. They find out her name, but nothing else.

== Plot ==
Gianni and Bruno are two students who travel the world, collecting a number of special souvenir statues of the Leaning Tower of Pisa. A clue leads them to the location of each statue. Working against them is The Killer, a man dressed all in black, who is collecting the statues himself.

When all the statues were placed in the correct order—on a secret panel inside the Leaning Tower—a secret treasure was supposed to be uncovered. In the final episode, the criminals stole all the statues and placed them incorrectly into the secret panel—causing the Tower to launch into outer space.

== Release ==
In August 2016 the UK version of the series began to be released on YouTube by the Italian producer Paul Casalini & Co. According to their Facebook page the entire series will eventually be released.
