= List of Vampire Princess Miyu episodes =

This is a list of episodes for the Vampire Princess Miyu original video animation and TV series. The original video animation series was released between July 1988 and April 1989, and the TV series aired from October 1997 to March 1998.

== Episode list ==
=== Original video animation series ===
No.	Title	Release date
1	"Unearthly Kyoto"; Transliteration: "Ayakashi no Miyako" (Japanese: 妖の都)	July 21, 1988
A spiritualist named Himiko Se is sent to Kyoto to help the daughter of a rich family named Aiko, who has been lying dormant for sixty days, and no doctor or priest would be of any help for her. After determining through examination that Aiko has been possessed, it seems Himiko is unable to release the spirit. A rumor is spread about a vampire in the area who has killed five people, which is confirmed with Miyahito, who witnessed his girlfriend being murdered by the vampire. Himiko is later attacked by this vampire at night, only to be saved by another vampire in the form of a young girl, later recognized as Miyu, who tells her that she shouldn't get involved into something out of her league. Himiko later witnesses Miyu taking Miyahito's blood, and he falls into a dream-like state. She makes more research and finds out that Aiko's parents died after donating all their blood to save their daughter, who later started saying she was a vampire and only then fell in her coma. Himiko returns to Aiko's home and then Miyu appears, explaining that Aiko is actually possessed by a shinma named Raen; this shinma deceives Aiko into thinking that she is a vampire living with her human parents. Then Miyu pulls Raen out of Aiko, banishing it into the darkness, unfortunately killing Aiko in the process. She concludes that Aiko would've survived if she had taken Miyu's own blood, but she's not sure about it being the best solution. After all of this, Himiko then swears to find this obscure vampire girl once again, and Miyahito is seen still in his trance.
2	"A Banquet of Marionettes"; Transliteration: "Ayatsuri no Utage" (Japanese: 繰の宴)	October 21, 1988
A boy named Kei falls in love with a strange and beautiful girl, who turns out to be a shinma named Ranka who may be capable of granting him immortality. He has been having internal conflicts with his future career in life, let alone doing poorly in school and disliking how his mother compares him to his successful siblings. At the same time, a man informs Himiko that his daughter has disappeared and might have mysterious turned in a doll, which leads Himiko to suspect that a shinma is behind this act... and the girl happens to be one of Kei's classmates. During her investigations, Miyu and Himiko talk again and Miyu introduces herself properly. She adds that it is her duty as a vampire to cast the shinma into the darkness, and that her companion Larva is bound to her through her blood. Later Miyu and Larva find Ranka and Kei in a cathedral, only to see that she has turned him into a doll-like Shinma like her; it turns out Kei liked Ranka not just because of her powers, but because he loved her as a person, and Ranka found herself loving him back so she couldn't just make him into a lifeless doll like her other victims. After viewing how strong their love is for each other, Miyu banishes them both into the darkness together; Himiko witnesses this and comments on how Miyu, despite having won the fight, lost the confrontation as a whole since Kei chose Ranka's love over hers.
3	"Fragile Armor"; Transliteration: "Moroki Yoroi" (Japanese: 脆き鎧)	December 21, 1988
Miyu reluctantly turns to Himiko to help her save Larva, who has been kidnapped by a shinma, in exchange for information regarding the shinma. Himiko faces the soul of an armored samurai standing in their way, performing a ritual spell to defeat it. Miyu is impressed and then she explains that Larva came to her as a shinma, intending to kill her before she realized her purpose as a vampire, but she awoke to her powers as they spoke; then she bit him, and he became the first living being whose blood she drank. After this, Larva was punished by the other Shinma by having his face and voice sealed away with a mask, tying him as Miyu's servant. To fulfill her part of the deal Himiko, first unaware for being used as bait, looks everywhere in town to find the whereabouts of the armored samurai, only to run into a shinma named Lemures, who captures her and says he believes that Larva should not fall into the hands of Miyu. Miyu appears and releases Himiko, only to be captured by the armored samurai that Himiko confronted, and then Larva frees himself and saves Miyu. Then Miyu burns Lemures to cinders, instead of sending him into the darkness, as punishment for what he did to Larva. Soon after, Miyu reveals to the armored samurai that he was once a human, but he was placed in a suit of armor after using his wife as a sacrifice. Anguished by this, the armored samurai raids the town, only to be gunned down by the police department. Himiko asks why she didn't let the armor believe that he was a Shinma from the start, and Miyu says she cannot just let others forget their humanity since she cannot do that herself.
4	"Frozen Time"; Transliteration: "Kogoeru Toki" (Japanese: 凍る刻)	April 1, 1989
Himiko goes back to the city of Kamakura, she spent her childhood to confirm whether a dream she had was real or not. She goes to her old home and sees it's been torn down; however, the place suddenly changes into an old but still on its feet Japanese home, with a ghastly room where a woman and her husband are frozen alive. Miyu shows up and says that this is actually her home and that she was normal until she turned thirteen years old, which is when she started craving blood and ultimately defeated Larva. She explains to Himiko that, after several days of confusion and agony (including her accidentally draining her classmate dry and killing her, and her human friend Akiko trying to offer her her own blood only to be turned away by Miyu's mother) she eventually figured out that her mother is a guardian shinma and her father is an immortal human, whom the mother exchanged blood with (like Miyu herself did with Miyahito). Miyu is summoned by the shinmas to become their new guardian, but she rejects her new nature as a vampire and runs away with her mother, refusing to drink blood again; the father remains there and is easily captured. Miyu is momentarily exhausted and dying for blood, so she gives in and drinks her mother's blood, making her collapse. The shinmas catch up with them and seal Miyu's parents away as punishment for disobeying: Miyu is told that the seal will be lifted if she can gather all the rogue shinmas, and because it may take centuries to accomplish, she is granted immortality and eternal youth. When Miyu is done with her story and disappears, Himiko is back to the empty spot and then she remembers another detail from her childhood. She remembers seeing Miyu when she was about five years old, and Miyu looked the exact same as she does now...

=== Television series ===
No.	Title	Original release date	English airdate
1	"The Fang Knows"; Transliteration: "Kiba wa Shitteiru" (Japanese: 牙は知っている)	October 7, 1997	August 28, 2001
Miyu Yamano is currently a high school transfer student in Kyoto. A boy named Nobuo Machiyama is aware that she is a vampire that mysteriously killed a girl named Yoko the previous night at a telephone booth. Later on, he visits his teacher Maiko Yanagihara to tell her that Miyu might be targeting her as the next victim. Yanagihara was spotted by a female student named Satsuki Morishita when she had shoplifted a box of chocolates at a store, but she tries to deny that she is in danger of getting caught. To avoid this, she summons her pet chameleon, which transforms in a shinma named Ga-Ryu, and attacks Satsuki head-on. Miyu appears and banishes Ga-Ryu into the darkness as a consequence. Miyu then puts Yanagihara to an eternal sleep, which has her tending to her garden full of flowers. Machiyama accidentally falls to his death off of the school's rooftop after failing to convince Miyu to allow him to kill shinmas alongside her.
2	"At the Next Station"; Transliteration: "Tsugi no Eki de" (Japanese: 次の駅で)	N/A	August 28, 2001
After transferring to Tokiwa High School-(an all-girls school) Miyu is invited by Chisato Inoue to eat lunch with her friends, Yukari Kashima and Hisae Aoki. A rumor is spread that beautiful, young women have mysteriously disappeared from the last route to a train station at night, which Miyu brings into speculation. When the four go shopping in a mall, Chisato buys matching charm pendants for Miyu and herself, symbolizing their new friendship together. Both Larva and Shiina warn Miyu not to become too close with the girls. At night, Miyu takes the train route and finds a young man, who brings her to his art gallery in an abandoned subway station, which so happens to be filled with beautiful, young women turned into mannequins. The young man, revealed to be a shinma named Ro-Sha, is then returned into the darkness by Miyu, but the beautiful, young women are unable to be saved.
3	"The Forest Calls"; Transliteration: "Mori ga Yobu" (Japanese: 森が呼ぶ)	October 14, 1997	August 28, 2001
Miyu and her friends are asked to visit the house of Yuko Shigeri, where her brother Kouichi Shigeri is slowly becoming paranoid from a strange mask hung from a wall, which is said to be worn by a witch doctor long ago, though Yuko's father seems to be skeptical about its myths. Larva explains that he met face to face with the mask, a shinma known as Kamen, that had possessed the witch doctor two hundred years ago, but he failed to destroy the mask after killing the witch doctor. Miyu later takes the mask with her and locks herself in a room, where Larva confronts Kamen head-on. After the mask is severed, it is burned to the ground, ending this two-hundred-year-old curse, or so it may seem to be.
4	"Reiha Has Come"; Transliteration: "Reiha ga Kita" (Japanese: 冷羽が来た)	October 28, 1997	October 23, 2001
Miyu chances upon Reiha with her talking doll companion Matsukaze at night while visiting the home of a father and his daughter, who leave for the mountains the next morning. As Miyu and Reiha set foot there as well to catch up with them, they are momentarily attacked by leeches before fending them off. The two then find a woman living in a cabin, who offers them her hospitality. The woman reveals herself to Miyu as a shinma, later recognized as En-Jyu, and has already accepted her fate, proving so by showing all her animal friends near a hot spring. However, Miyu and Reiha have figured out ahead of time that this woman had turned the father and daughter into animals when they had stopped by. Miyu is soon able to send En-Jyu back into the darkness as punishment, but this makes all the animals go on a rampage. In response, Reiha freezes all the animals to death.
5	"Sepia Colored Portrait"; Transliteration: "Sepia no Shōzō" (Japanese: セピアの肖像)	October 21, 1997	October 23, 2001
Chisato, Yukari and Hisae meet Oshima, a man who produced an unfinished romance movie he starred in decades ago, and they conjure up a plan to search for the woman who played the role of the leading lady whose name is Kayoko. At night, Oshima later finds his movie reel thrown in the trash by his wife. After he leaves, Miyu has a brief encounter with a shinma called Gen-Eh that has dwelt inside the movie reel. The next morning, Miyu's friends realize that Kayoko is Oshima's wife, much to their surprise. Oshima tells Miyu that he married Kayoko to prove his love for her, but all it did was make her feel bitter towards him. Gen-Eh, having possessed Oshima, devours him into the film. Miyu, following the shinma inside, cuts off all sources of light and inflames her into the darkness, destroying the film in the process.
6	"Ghost of Miyu"; Transliteration: "Miyu no Bōrei" (Japanese: 美夕の亡霊)	November 4, 1997	October 23, 2001
Gossips have been spreading around about a ghost disappearing from a taxicab while being taken toward a cemetery. The next night, another taxicab driver is bitten by a fanged ghost resembling that of Miyu. Reiha and Matsukaze later accuse Miyu for what she has done, but Miyu believes she is being impersonated. Chisato falls victim to this doppelganger in a classroom the next day, but it runs off once Miyu arrives at the scene. Miyu contacts Chisato to meet her at the park at night in order to lure out her doppelganger. Reiha attacks the doppelganger at a distance, revealing it to be a shinma named Ho-Jyo, which then allows Miyu to send him into the darkness. Reiha and Matsukaze leave with their doubts of Miyu carrying out her duties as the shinma guardian. At school the following day, Miyu apologizes to Chisato for putting her life in danger.
7	"Fate"; Transliteration: "Shukumei" (Japanese: 宿命)	November 11, 1997	October 23, 2001
Miyu meets a young boy named Kiyoshi, gifted with the ability of telepathy, though this causes him severe headaches when he hears negative thoughts. Kayo, his little sister, would uncontrollably activate her powers of psychokinesis at people when she sees him in this condition. At night, Kiyoshi and Kayo find a stray dog who had been abused in the past. After Miyu spends some time with Kayo, Kiyoshi and the dog return after they having discreetly stolen some money in the streets. When Miyu departs, Kiyoshi surprisingly starts to hear her negative thoughts, advising Kayo not to associate with her any longer. The following night, Miyu, detecting that the dog is a shinma known as Cho-Jyu, who tries to take control of Kiyoshi, sends him into the darkness. Reiha arrives and freezes Kiyoshi, shattering him to pieces. However, as this leaves Kayo mourning for her brother, Miyu puts Kayo into an eternal sleep to ease her suffering, the latter's dreams showing her and Kiyoshi in happier times.
8	"Red Shoes"; Transliteration: "Akai Kutsu" (Japanese: 赤いくつ)	November 18, 1997	January 22, 2002
Chisato invites her classmate Miho Arisawa as her support to a singing audition produced by Takashi Kashiwabara, only to be personally asked by him to participate in this audition herself. As she begins to feel down about herself, Kashiwabara gives her magical red shoes, which then gives her the confidence to sing in front of a live audience. After completing her first record album, she becomes the talk of the school. A jealous Michiko attempts to raid Miho's room and steal the red shoes, but she is ultimately killed by Kashiwabara. As Miho and Kashiwabara prepare for the upcoming concert, Miyu interrupts their private session, already knowing that the red shoes will slowly deplete Miho's life. After Kashiwabara transforms into a shinma called Kyo-Koh, Miyu banishes him into the darkness. Miyu then puts Miho in an eternal sleep, allowing Miho to dream of her stardom. However, she can no longer take off the red shoes, under possible death.
9	"Your House"; Transliteration: "Anata no Ie" (Japanese: あなたの家)	November 25, 1997	January 22, 2002
A man jumps off a ledge of an apartment building at night, which causes much commotion from the coworkers. Yasuhiro and Saori Takashima are requested by the man's wife and father to take care of a cat with heterochromia. The two go on thinking that its two different colored eyes are to bring them good luck in life. Sooner than later, Saori becomes attached to the cat, even to the point of calling it her son, to which Yasuhiro becomes concerned for his relationship with her. Before Saori returns from the store, Yasuhiro realizes that the cat is able to speak. As he tries to pry the cat away from her, she stabs him in the chest with a kitchen knife, leading her to jump off the ledge due to trauma. Miyu comes to confront the cat, a shinma called Han-Ki, returning him into the darkness.
10	"Swamp of Promises"; Transliteration: "Yakusoku no Numa" (Japanese: 約束の沼)	December 2, 1997	January 22, 2002
While heading to a resort during a downpour with her friends, Miyu senses the shadow of a snakelike shinma nearby. Chisato, wandering away from Yukari and Hisae, finds herself in a shrine near a swamp, encountering a boy who is waiting for a girl to come back. Chisato keeps him company until nightfall, promising to return the next day. Reiha approaches the boy, believing that he is the shinma, but Miyu intervenes and says otherwise. As Reiha destroys a mirror inside the shrine, a shinma named Ja-Ka emerges from the swamp and attempts to kill Miyu and the boy. With Larva's help, Miyu is then able to send Ja-Ka back into the darkness. Although it is hinted that the boy is a shinma himself, he still keeps his vow to wait for the girl to come back for him.
11	"A Supple Face"; Transliteration: "Yawarakai Kao" (Japanese: 柔らかい顔)	December 9, 1997	January 22, 2002
After being shot down by the yakuza, a former hitman named Ryuji is revived through plastic surgery on his face by an unknown female doctor at a rundown hospital. Ryuji finds his girlfriend Yoko at a local bar, though she does not recognize him by face, much to his advantage. Reintroducing himself to her as a different person named "Kenji", they go to an amusement park and stay at a hotel room to spend the night together. The next day, Ryuji finds himself in his room on two occasions, surprised to know that he killed the yakuza leader and a female student, but had no memory of doing so. The final time he goes out at night, he ends up outside the entrance of the hospital. Miyu, after having followed Ryuji inside the hospital, confronts the doctor, who is revealed to be a shinma named Oh-Shu. Both Larva and Reiha struggle to defeat the shinma this time, but Miyu soon manages to send Oh-Shu into the darkness. Ryuji later wakes up to his original face, but Yoko pierces him in the chest with a butcher knife due to confusion.
12	"Garden of Crying Reeds"; Transliteration: "Ashi no Naku Niwa" (Japanese: 葦の啼く庭)	December 16, 1997	March 26, 2002
A man named Maki recently lost his kitten and is upset about it. Fortunately for him, Chisato finds a kitten on the way to school, so she decides to give it to the man. Though he first refuses to take care of the kitten, he changes his mind afterward. He goes to an abandoned house where he meets a mysterious woman, a cat lover herself. She absorbs the spirit of the kitten into a white rose she holds in her hand, planting it in a garden of flowers full of feline spirits. Maki believes that the cats should be free to wander than to be bound into flowers. However, this angers the woman, as she transforms in a shinma called Ko-Jyoh and tries to absorb his spirit. Miyu arrives and burns down the entire garden, then banishes Ko-Jyoh back into the darkness. She then puts Maki into an eternal sleep, which leads him to take care of an imaginary kitten.
13	"Light of the Sea (Part 1)"; Transliteration: "Umi no Hikari (Zenpen)" (Japanese: 海の光(前編))	December 23, 1997	March 26, 2002
When Miyu takes on a shinma known as Ryu, Larva lets him get away, much to Miyu's suspicion. Ryu, reverted to human form, is taken into the hospitality of another shinma named Nami, who serves as a prostitute in her human form. Ryu tells her that he has inherited a death crystal in his heart, which forces him to fight against his own will. Larva senses the "light of the sea", and he sets off on his own to look for this in his hometown. When Reiha and Matsukaze locate Ryu, Nami steps in and creates a barrier to disallow Miyu from hurting both of them. However, Nami becomes weakened and the barrier disappears, and it is soon realized that Nami has also been infected with the death crystal. Meanwhile, Larva easily defeats Barrow, becomes overwhelmed to unconsciousness by Lilith and is taken on the ghost ship to Garline, all of whom are Western shinmas acquainted with him.
14	"Light of the Sea (Part 2)"; Transliteration: "Umi no Hikari (Kōhen)" (Japanese: 海の光(後編))	January 6, 1998	March 26, 2002
Ryu and Nami lead Miyu and Reiha to the village, only to be stopped by Barrow. Nonetheless, the four work together in order to end the life of this shinma. Miyu, upon entering the ghost ship, is subdued by Lilith with her ocarina, but Miyu is able to burn Lilith to ashes due to her body being made out of paper. Miyu faces Garline with his death crystal sword, trying to reach a dormant Larva with her voice. When Larva hears her, he takes out Garline in one blow to the chest. Before Garline dies, Larva explains that Miyu chose him as his servant and friend by binding her blood with his. Miyu and Larva depart as the ghost ship begins to deteriorate, only to find out that Reiha purposely froze Ryu and Nami to death. Miyu charges at Reiha for doing this, but Larva intervenes and allows Reiha to take leave. In a last act of kindness, Miyu sends Ryu and Nami into the darkness, where they will never be separated from each other.
15	"Dream of the Mermaid"; Transliteration: "Ningyo no Yume" (Japanese: 人魚の夢)	January 13, 1998	March 26, 2002
A boy named Toshihiro walks inside the special room of an aquarium and finds a mermaid submerged in a tank of water, later showing Miyu as well. He soon figures out that the mermaid wants to return to the ocean, but the aquarium director has her reasons otherwise. Toshihiro, going against Miyu's advice, sneaks in the special room, but, as he jumps into the tank to save her, she devours him whole, filling the tank with blood. After Larva shatters the tank, the mermaid is exposed as a shinma named Rin-Koh, and Miyu sends her into the darkness. The aquarium director is one who had eaten mermaid flesh as a child to become immortal, but she tried to starve herself into old age, especially after all the boys she has seen that have fallen victim to the mermaid's dream. Miyu rejects to put the aquarium director into an eternal sleep, since she already bears the burden of immortality and would eventually die after a century's time.
16	"Woman Priest"; Transliteration: "Onna Dōshi" (Japanese: 女道士)	January 20, 1998	March 26, 2002
In Hong Kong, a female martial artist named Yui-Li comes face to face with a shinma, taking the form of her lover, who manages to escape from her attacks. When she goes back to her dojo, she is horrified to see the shinma taking the form of her master, being reminded that all her loved ones were all consumed by him. Just when Yui-Li is nearly defeated, the shinma vanishes when Miyu arrives. A stubborn Yui-Li will go to extra lengths to kill the shinma, and she does not want Miyu to interfere with her business. On a harbor ship, Yui-Li encounters the shinma, known as Koh-Waku, who changes to the forms of each of her loved ones in order to recognize her selfish desire for revenge. Miyu appears before Koh-Waku has the chance of consuming Yui-Li's soul. With Yui-Li's help, Miyu returns Koh-Waku back into the darkness. Miyu suggests Yui-Li to take her time to grieve for her loved ones, rather than to be put into an eternal sleep.
17	"The Moray Boat"; Transliteration: "Utsubobune" (Japanese: うつぼ舟)	January 27, 1998	May 14, 2002
A gas station worker named Mayumi Takahashi admits to being a shinma living with a novelist named Kyouichi Yaguchi. She is aware that Miyu has come for her to send her into the darkness, but Miyu states that she would return when it is time to do so. Mayumi returns home from work the next day, only to scolded by Yaguchi's wife, who demands that he must return to her. However, Mayumi accidentally kills his wife when the latter tried to strangle her. Yaguchi and Mayumi are forced to run away together by train, but Miyu is soon able to track them down near the shore. Mayumi unveils her identity as the shinma known as Ayu, and agrees to have a match against Miyu, not to mention in front of Yaguchi. Miyu defeats Ayu and returns her into the darkness. Yaguchi, crying for his loss, turns into a baby, and Miyu sends him out to sea by boat to a village said to be a land of happiness.
18	"City of Illusion"; Transliteration: "Mugen no Machi" (Japanese: 夢幻の街)	February 3, 1998	May 14, 2002
Incidents have been reported about various stores suddenly being dissolved into sand. An architect named Yasuhiko Tachiki has been building his own model city underground for thirty years, but Miyu does not sense a shinma nearby. When a weary Tachiki sits down at a mall, he then goes on a rampage after seeing a familiar old priest. Police officers chase him to the underground, where they are attacked by a moving Buddha statue. The statue peaks toward the mall, causing the shoppers to evacuate. Reiha unleashes a blizzard attack on the statue, soon breaking it to pieces. Miyu already knew that Tachiki's wife was the shinma named Moh-Chi, who was responsible for transferring stores underground. After Miyu banishes Moh-Chi into the darkness, she realized that the city was supposed to be the nest for Moh-Chi's baby spiders. Tachiki is then still seen building his model city, even without Moh-Chi's influence.
19	"Love of the Dolls"; Transliteration: "Ningyōshi no Koi" (Japanese: 人形師の恋)	February 10, 1998	May 14, 2002
A doll maker named Kasumi Kimihara showcases her doll models at an exhibition, and she returns home to her private room which houses her special doll, whom she loves very much. The following day, the art gallery owner sends a girl named Yuki Fujimura to Kasumi's house to serve as her maid, much to Kasumi's chagrin. After taking a shower at night, she finds Yuki inside the private room, but Kasumi stops her before she tries to touch the doll. After much uncertainty, Kasumi finally catches Yuki red-handed for trying to kiss the doll. Kasumi stabs the doll several times out of anger with a pocket knife, but it rises back up as a shima called Kai-Rai. Miyu appears and sends Kai-Rai into the darkness, but also burns down the entire mansion. At another exhibition, it is hinted that Kasumi and Yuki are said to have become a couple.
20	"Butterfly Enchantment"; Transliteration: "Rinshi no Kowaku" (Japanese: 鱗翅の蠱惑)	February 17, 1998	May 14, 2002
After hearing word of a student named Ruri Sone having survived a house fire, Miyu is invited to spend time with her there. Miyu meets Hiroshi Sone, Ruri's soft-spoken father and former paleontologist. The next day, Ruri explains to Miyu that Hiroshi received a butterfly as a gift and let it roam free in the greenhouse, yet she believes that her father has become obsessed with this butterfly since he goes to the greenhouse every night just to see it. This butterfly has actually taken the form of a fairy, making Hiroshi's dreams come true, but Miyu interrupts and ends this cycle. It is revealed that Ruri's mind has been inhabited by a shinma named Maji-Kan, who distorted Hiroshi's thoughts of her being a fairy. When Miyu sends Maji-Kan into the darkness, Hiroshi runs into the flames and is burned alive. Miyu then puts Ruri into an eternal sleep so that she will never feel lonely ever again.
21	"Flag of Shinma"; Transliteration: "Shinma no Hata" (Japanese: 神魔の旗)	February 24, 1998	May 14, 2002
A village has been attacked by three unknown shinmas, urging the remaining villagers to keep their guard up for any foreigners. Miyu is taken hostage, also running into Reiha there. The village chief just so happens to come from the bloodline of shinma protectors, obliged to serve and protect the guardians for generations. He explains that the three shinmas will return the next day to claim Sato, the chief's daughter, as their bride. As noon passes, the shinmas approach the village gate, only to be thwarted by Miyu and Reiha. The names of the shinmas are Genzo, Genji and Genta. One by one, each of the three are sent into the darkness with Miyu and Reiha combining their powers. The village chief sacrifices himself to save Miyu from being hurt, but this make Sato commit suicide, which forces Reiha to freeze all the villagers to death.
22	"Once Upon a Time"; Transliteration: "Miyu Mukashigatari" (Japanese: 美夕昔語り)	March 3, 1998	July 16, 2002
When Miyu was a child, her father died before she had turned fourteen years old, and her mother had been overwhelmed by this. A well acquainted magician named Kitjutsushi asks the mother for permission to bring Miyu with him to assist in his magic show, after Miyu first met Reiha as the daughter of this magician. Miyu rehearses a skit with them, first not knowing it was a ritual to awaken her powers as a shinma guardian, but later explained by her mother. A man named Black Kite transforms into a shinma, recognized as Tonbi, then attacks and kills Kitjutsushi. After Miyu's mother is then murdered by Tonbi, Miyu realizes her fire powers and sends Tonbi into the darkness. From then on, Miyu embarks on a journey to cast all stray shinmas into the darkness.
23	"Confrontation"; Transliteration: "Taiketsu no Toki" (Japanese: 対決のとき)	March 10, 1998	July 16, 2002
An unnamed stray shinma, disguised as a salaryman, is frozen to death, and news is later reported upon the matter. Yukari and Hisae begin to speculate about Miyu, but Chisato sees nothing wrong. Reiha and Matsukaze cover the city with snow to lure Miyu into battle and encase Larva in ice. Reiha has shown envy toward Miyu since the time she had heard Kitjutsushi calling out for Miyu before he was killed by Tonbi. After that, Reiha and Matsukaze had stumbled upon an unnamed shinma deep in the forest feasting on a creature, and she somehow manifested her ice powers and froze this shinma to death. When Reiha is unable to dodge Miyu's fire attack, Matsukaze shields her from being incinerated. Reiha becomes outraged by this, going all out at full force. However, as she prepares to finish Miyu off, Larva breaks free and cuts off her head. Reiha departs, promising that she will defeat Miyu the next time they meet.
24	"The Boy Who Returned"; Transliteration: "Kaettekita Otoko" (Japanese: 帰って来た男子)	March 17, 1998	July 16, 2002
Tokiya Inoue, Chisato's older brother, unexpectedly returns from his mission trip studying on birds. As Chisato introduces him to her friends, Miyu realizes that he is a stray shinma. After school the next day, Hisae overhears Tokiya challenging Miyu to the duel at night, and she goes to inform Yukari about it. It is revealed that Tokiya possesses a bird crest on his back given by a mysterious talking bird he had encountered during his trip. Yukari and Hisae witness Miyu and Tokiya passing through a demon gate. There, Tokiya transforms into a shinma known as Hiyoku. After a while, Miyu is able to return Hiyoku into the darkness, but Tokiya dies from the fire. Yukari and Hisae are then startled upon seeing Miyu coming out from the demon gate.
25	"The Last Shinma"; Transliteration: "Saigo no Shinma" (Japanese: 最後の神魔)	March 24, 1998	July 16, 2002
Hisae's research on Miyu ultimately has led to her death. Miyu has not shown up at school ever since that day, and Yukari tries but fails to convince Chisato that Miyu has something to do with Hisae's death. At night, Miyu and Yukari encounter the street vendor they met when Chisato bought two charm pendants at the mall long ago. The street vendor then shows itself as a shinma named Shidon. Miyu tells Yukari to leave while she deals with Shidon. He explains that Tokiya was used to lure Miyu into defeat, and he also hinted that Chisato has been a shinma from the very beginning. The scene flashes back to when the street vendor awakens Chisato's bird powers at the school grounds, and Hisae happens to be the first victim to be killed. When Miyu finds this out, she lets Larva take over the match and rushes to Chisato's house, only to find that Chisato has killed Yukari. The battle between Miyu and Chisato has now commenced.
26	"The Eternal Sleep"; Transliteration: "Eien no Nemuri" (Japanese: 永遠の午睡)	March 31, 1998	July 16, 2002
Shidon knows that Miyu will not have the strength to send Chisato into the darkness, but Larva says otherwise. Miyu tries to send Chisato into the darkness, but Chisato repels the flames and pierces Miyu with her spear. Miyu's mother appears in her subconscious, asking Miyu if she wants to wear a kimono in red or in white. As Miyu sees her younger self stacking white rocks near a red river, the rocks start to dissolve into sand across the river, and then she realizes that she must choose between captivity or death as her fate. Miyu, refusing to die, awakens and grabs onto Chisato's leg, while Larva, after defeating Shidon, slices off Chisato's head. Miyu puts Chisato into an eternal sleep, in which she is seen hanging out with Yukari and Hisae in a park, before sending her into the darkness.
