= List of programmes broadcast by Nick Jr. (UK & Ireland) =

This is a list of programming which has aired on the TV channel Nick Jr. in the United Kingdom and Ireland (including Nick Jr. Too).

== Current programming ==
=== Original programming ===
- The Adventures of Paddington (2019–present)
- Ben and Holly's Little Kingdom (2009–present)
- Peppa Pig (2004–present)

=== Acquired from Nick Jr. USA ===
- Blaze and the Monster Machines (2015–present)
- Blue's Clues & You! (2020–present)
- Dora (2024–present)
- HexVets and Magic Pets (2026–present)
- Paw Patrol (2013–present)
- Rubble and Crew (2023–present)
- Super Duper Bunny League (2025–present)
- The Tiny Chef Show (2023–present)

=== Other acquired programming ===
- Bedtime Stories with Ryan (2026–present)
- Circle Square (2026–present)
- The Creature Cases (2025–present)
- Deer Squad (2021–present)
- Gabby's Dollhouse (2024–present)
- Hamsters of Hamsterdale (2024–present)
- The Marsupilamis (2026–present)
- Mixmups (2026–present)
- Mr. Crocodile (2025–present)
- Odo (2026–present)
- The Smurfs (2021–present)
- Thomas and Friends: All Engines Go! (2022–present)
- Tim Rex in Space (2025–present)

== Former programming ==
=== Original programming ===
- Angelina Ballerina: The Next Steps (30 November 2009 – 19 November 2014)
- Blue's Clues (original series, UK version) (5 January 1999 – 10 November 2014)
- Bubble and Squeak (5 February 2007 – 6 January 2014)
- Digby Dragon (4 July 2016 – 18 May 2021)
- The Early Worms (1999 – 21 April 2015) (Including shows, segments, and blocks)
- Fifi and the Flowertots (30 May 2005 – 10 November 2015)
- Go!Go!Go! (6 May 2013 – 2 August 2015, aired during advert breaks)
- Humf (2 March 2009 – 5 August 2017)
- Lily's Driftwood Bay (5 May 2014 – 27 May 2017)
- The Magic Roundabout (2007 Revival series) (22 October 2008 – 10 November 2015)
- Olive the Ostrich (5 September 2011 – 29 October 2014)
- Pic Me (1 August 2005 – 23 August 2012)
- Poppy Cat (2 May 2011 – 18 November 2014)
- Puffin Rock (18 May 2015 – 9 April 2017)
- Roary the Racing Car (2 June 2007 – 16 December 2011)
- Thomas & Friends (1999 – 19 February 2015) (Note: Nick Jr. UK co-commissioned the sixth to eleventh seasons.)
- What's Your News? (12 January 2009 – 1 January 2014)
- Wobblyland (1 October 2008 – 1 April 2013)
- You Do Too (4 February 2002 – 1 November 2011)
- Zack & Quack (7 February 2014 – 30 January 2016)

=== Acquired from Nickelodeon/Nick Jr. (US) ===
- Baby Shark's Big Show! (2021 – 3 January 2025)
- The Backyardigans (5 September 2005 – 16 December 2014)
- Bubble Guppies (2011 – 4 April 2025)
- Butterbean's Café (4 February 2019 – 2 July 2021)
- Dora and Friends: Into the City! (3 November 2014 – 1 September 2019)
- Dora the Explorer (2002 – 4 February 2024)
- Eureeka's Castle (1999–2009)
- The Fresh Beat Band (9 August 2010 – 3 December 2017)
- Fresh Beat Band of Spies (6 February 2016 – 1 July 2017)
- Go, Diego, Go! (5 June 2005 – 5 November 2018)
- Little Bill (2000 – 24 November 2014)
- Mutt & Stuff (11 January 2020 – 5 April 2020)
- Nella the Princess Knight (15 May 2017 – 19 May 2021)
- Ni Hao, Kai-Lan (7 September 2008 – 5 January 2015)
- Rugrats (1999 – 6 January 2014)
- Ryan's Mystery Playdate (2019 – 1 April 2024)
- Santiago of the Seas (2020 – 1 April 2024)
- Shimmer and Shine (9 November 2015 – 31 December 2019)
- Sunny Day (2 March 2018 – 29 December 2019)
- Team Umizoomi (6 September 2010 – 19 May 2021)
- Top Wing (7 May – 1 August 2018)
- The Upside Down Show (10 April 2005 – 17 September 2010)
- Wonder Pets! (6 November 2008 – 5 January 2015)
- Wow! Wow! Wubbzy! (5 May 2008 – 8 January 2013)
- Yo Gabba Gabba! (18 February 2008 – 6 January 2014)

=== Acquired programming ===
- 44 Cats (5 March 2019 – 6 February 2020) (now on Tiny Pop)
- Abby Hatcher (6 May 2019 – 3 November 2022) (also aired on Milkshake)
- The Adventures of Portland Bill (1999 – 2 September 2009)
- Alvinnn!!! and the Chipmunks (10 April 2015 – 20 January 2020) (only on Nicktoons and Nickelodeon)
- Animal Alphabet (1999 – 5 February 2009) (continued into 2011 as intervals)
- Animal Antics (1999 – 30 September 2009)
- Anna and Friends (4 July 2022 — 21 July 2024)
- Astro Farm (1999 – 5 October 2009)
- Babar (1998 – 1 July 2009)
- Baby Animals (1999 – 3 February 2009)
- Bagpuss (1998 – 4 January 2009)
- Bananas in Pyjamas (original series) (1999 – 31 August 2009)
- Barbapapa: One Big Happy Family! (2021–2025)
- Becca's Bunch (2 July 2018 – 25 December 2019)
- Big Block SingSong (7 January 2013 – 22 July 2018, Moved to Sky Kids in 2023)
- Billy (2000 – 3 February 2009)
- Bob the Builder (original series, including Project Build It) (1999 – 6 February 2012)
- Bod (1999 – 24 January 2009)
- Boohbah (2 April 2005 – 31 October 2009)
- The Bopps (4 April 2010 – 11 November 2016)
- Brave Bunnies (2021–2025)
- Bruno (2004–2011) (aired during advert breaks)
- Budgie the Little Helicopter (1999 – 1 September 2009)
- Bump (2 August 2004 – 2 October 2009)
- The Busy World of Richard Scarry (1998 – 1 July 2009)
- Button Moon (1 May 2005 – 30 March 2009)
- Calvin & Kaison's Play Power (2020–2022)
- Camberwick Green (31 March 2008 – 5 October 2009)
- Chigley (28 May 2007 – 4 January 2009)
- Christopher Crocodile (2000 – 3 February 2009)
- Clangers (Original series 1–2 only) (2000 – 4 January 2009)
- Corn & Peg (10 August 2019 – 2 November 2020)
- Crystal Tipps and Alistair (4 April 2005 – 2 September 2009)
- Cubeez (1 October 2001 – 5 October 2009)
- The Day Henry Met... (4 January 2016 – 19 May 2021)
- Dinosaur Train (20 February 2012 – 2 April 2015)
- Dream Street (6 December 2002 – 28 February 2009)
- Engie Benjy (1 September 2003 – 30 July 2009)
- The Fairies (27 August 2008 – 6 January 2014)
- Feodor (2000 – 1 July 2009)
- The Flumps (1 July 2002 – 3 February 2009)
- Floogals (2021–2022)
- Fraggle Rock (1999–2009)
- Franklin (1999 – 24 August 2009) (also aired on Channel 5's Milkshake!)
- Frootie Tooties (2000–2009)
- The Gingerbread Man (2002 – 3 February 2009)
- Guess How Much I Love You (12 January 2013 – 4 January 2015)
- Gullah Gullah Island (1999 – 1 July 2009)
- Hattytown Tales (2000 – 3 February 2009)
- Henry's Cat (2001 – 3 February 2009)
- The Herbs (2000 – 4 March 2009)
- The Hoobs (4 February 2002 – 5 October 2009)
- The Hooley Dooleys (2000–2009)
- Huxley Pig (2000 – 3 February 2009)
- I Spy (6 October 2003 – 1 April 2009) (Continued on Nick Jr Too in 2006)
- Ivor the Engine (1999 – 4 January 2009)
- It's a Big Big World (2008–2013) (Only aired on Nick Jr Too)
- James the Cat (2000 – September 1, 2009)
- Jimbo and the Jet-Set (3 July 2002 – 3 February 2009)
- Kangaroo Beach (2021–2025)
- Kid-E-Cats (5 June 2018 – 29 December 2019) (now on Sky Kids)
- King Rollo (2000 – 31 August 2009)
- Kipper (2 September 2002 – 4 September 2009) (also aired on Tiny Pop)
- Kitu and Woofl (1 January 2002 – 3 February 2009)
- Kiva Can Do (9 January 2018 – 19 May 2021)
- Knyacki (2000–2013)
- Lalaloopsy (7 October 2013 – 2 November 2014)
- LazyTown (3 October 2005 – 31 October 2011) (season 1–2 only) (also aired on CBeebies)
- Let's Go Pocoyo (1 October 2012 – 11 June 2016)
- Lisa (1999 – 3 February 2009)
- Little Bear (1999 – 10 December 2009) (also aired on Tiny Pop)
- Little Charmers (22 June 2015 – 7 May 2022)
- Lizzie's Library (2000 – 3 February 2009)
- Louie (6 August 2013 – 26 May 2015)
- Maggie and the Ferocious Beast (2001 – 26 August 2012)
- Magic Mountain (1 July 2001 – 3 February 2009)
- The Magic School Bus (1999–2009)
- The Magic Adventures of Mumfie (2000 – 1 September 2009)
- Maisy (2 September 2002 – 31 January 2009) (Continued on Nick Jr Too in 2006–2009)
- Max & Ruby (31 March 2003 – 19 May 2021)
- Milo (2023–2025)
- Mini Movers (5 November 2008 – 4 July 2015)
- Mouse and Mole (6 January 2003 – 5 October 2009)
- Mr Benn (1999 – 5 May 2009)
- Mr. Men and Little Miss (1999 – 30 July 2009)
- Muppet Babies (1999–2009)
- Nellie the Elephant (2000–2009)
- Oakie Doke (1 March 2003 – 2 November 2009)
- Olivia (11 January 2010 – 31 August 2014)
- Pablo the Little Red Fox (2000 – 1 September 2009)
- Paddington Bear (1999 – 5 October 2009)
- Pajanimals (23 September 2013 – 7 April 2017) (also aired on Tiny Pop)
- Papa Beaver's Storytime (1999–2009)
- Parsley the Lion (3 September 2005 – 30 March 2009)
- PB Bear and Friends (1999 – 1 September 2009)
- Pip & Posy (2022–2026)
- Pirata & Capitano (2019–2025)
- Pocoyo (10 September 2012 – 19 November 2014)
- Rainbow (6 March 2005 – 4 January 2011)
- Ricky Zoom (2019 – 24 December 2024)
- Robocar Poli (4 March 2017 – 4 June 2018)
- Rusty Rivets (6 March 2017 – 7 July 2022)
- Sali Mali (1 October 2002 – 3 March 2009)
- Sesame Street (2000 – 31 August 2009)
- Sharkdog (2025–2026)
- Sheeep (2000–2009)
- Snailympics (2001 – 3 February 2009)
- Spider! (6 March 2005 – 2 November 2009)
- Super Why! (2 June 2008 – 5 January 2014)
- Tickety Toc (23 April 2012 – 24 December 2015) (now on Sky Kids)
- Toot & Puddle (6 July 2009 – 1 September 2012)
- Tot Cop (2019)
- The Treacle People (2001 – 2 September 2009)
- Trumpton (5 March 2005 – 4 January 2009)
- Wake Up World (2008–2013)
- Wanda and the Alien (5 January 2015 – 31 October 2015)
- Wallykazam! (6 October 2014 – 15 March 2019)
- WaterMill Farm (Aired During Ad Breaks) (5 September 2011 – 3 May 2015)
- The Wiggles (5 April 2004 – 8 August 2012)
- Wiggle And Learn (7 March 2009 – 19 September 2012)
- Wiggly Park (1999 – 3 February 2009)
- Wimzie's House (1999–2009)
- Wissper (8 August 2017 – 4 September 2017)
- The Wombles (1999 – 4 January 2009)
- The Wubbulous World of Dr. Seuss (1999–2009)
- Zoofari (1 August 2018 – 2 September 2021)

== See also ==
- List of programmes broadcast by Nickelodeon (UK & Ireland)
- List of programmes broadcast by Nicktoons (UK & Ireland)
