= List of programmes broadcast by Nickelodeon (British and Irish TV channel) =

This is a list of programmes currently, formerly, and upcoming on Nickelodeon in the United Kingdom and Ireland.

== Current programming ==
=== Live-action ===
Title	Premiere date	Number of seasons
Tyler Perry's Young Dylan	5 June 2020	3
Rock Island Mysteries	4 July 2022	3
The Really Loud House	27 February 2023	2
NFL Slimetime	February 2024	3
Nickelodeon Slimetime UK	February 2024	1
Popularity Papers	5 April 2024	1
Play Like A Sponge	29 July 2024	1
Turtle Academy	6 January 2025	1
Planet Lulin	11 January 2025	1
The Thundermans: Undercover	February 2025	1
Erin and Aaron	March 2026	1

=== Animation ===
Title	Premiere date	Number of seasons
SpongeBob SquarePants	3 January 2000	16
Alvinnn!!! and the Chipmunks	10 April 2015	reruns
The Loud House	30 May 2016	9
It's Pony	20 April 2020	reruns
The Smurfs	22 October 2021	2
The Patrick Star Show	25 October 2021	3
Lego City Adventures	30 June 2022	reruns
Best & Bester	3 September 2022	1
Monster High	7 October 2022	reruns
Transformers: EarthSpark	21 November 2022	1
Kamp Koral: SpongeBob's Under Years	26 June 2023	reruns
Rock Paper Scissors	19 February 2024	1
Zokie of Planet Ruby	16 April 2024	1
Open Season: Call of Nature	29 July 2024	1
44 Cats	3 September 2024	reruns
Tales of the Teenage Mutant Ninja Turtles	9 September 2024	1
Max & the Midknights	2 November 2024	1
Sonic Prime	25 January 2025	1
The Fairly OddParents: A New Wish	24 May 2025	1
Wylde Pak	6 October 2025	1
The Boss Baby: Back in Business	16 February 2026	1
The Marsupilamis	7 September 2026	reruns

=== Programming from Nick Jr. ===
Title	Premiere date	Number of seasons
The Creature Cases	7 September 2026	reruns
Deer Squad	7 September 2026	reruns
Gabby's Dollhouse	7 September 2026	reruns

=== Live-action programmes ===
Title	Premiere date	End date	Number of seasons
iCarly	8 March 2008	5 April 2013	5
Victorious	14 September 2010	21 October 2013	4
House of Anubis	2011	2013	3
Sam & Cat	1 September 2013	28 November 2014	1
The Haunted Hathaways	2013	2015	2
The Thundermans	7 April 2014	2 November 2018	4
Every Witch Way	2014	2016	4
Henry Danger	13 February 2015	17 April 2020	5
Game Shakers	2 November 2015	23 May 2019	3
School of Rock	2016	2018	3
Hunter Street	24 April 2017	20 May 2021	4
I Am Frankie	2017	2018	2
Find Me in Paris	2018	2020	3
Danger Force	4 September 2020	2024	3
Drama Club	2021	2022	1
That Girl Lay Lay	30 January 2023	30 March 2024	2

== Former programming ==
- 100 Deeds for Eddie McDowd (2004)
- The Adventures of Pete & Pete (1994–1997)
- The Adventures of Portland Bill (1994–1999)
- Lightning Point (2012–2013)
- Albert the Fifth Musketeer
- All That (2020–2021)
- Alvin and the Chipmunks (1994–1997)
- The Alvin Show (1995–1997)
- The Amanda Show (July 2001 – 2013)
- America's Most Musical Family (2019–January 2020)
- Animal Antics (1999–2000)
- The Animals of Farthing Wood (1996–1997)
- Animorphs (1998–2001)
- Are You Afraid of the Dark? (1994–1998; 2002–2003; 2008–2009; 2019–2023)
- Arthur
- The Astronauts (2022)
- As Told by Ginger (2002–2005)
- Attack of the Killer Tomatoes (1994–1997)
- Barbie: Life in the Dreamhouse (specials only)
- Bailey Kipper's P.O.V. (1995–1996)
- Bananas In Pyjamas (1994–2000)
- Batfink (1994–1995)
- Bay City (1995–1996)
- Bella and the Bulldogs (2015–2019; 2021)
- Best of Slimefest (2020-2021)
- Big Blue (7 March 2022 – 2022)
- Big Nate (10 July 2023 – 2024)
- Big Time Rush (2010-2015; 2020-2021; 2023)
- Bin Weevils (2006-2007)
- The Blobheads (2004–2006)
- Blossom (2004–2006)
- Bob the Builder
- Bod
- Bossy Bear (2023)
- The Brothers García (2001–04)
- Bubble and Squeak (2010)
- Budgie the Little Helicopter
- Bucket & Skinner's Epic Adventures (2011–2014)
- The Bureau of Magical Things (2018–2021)
- The Busy World of Richard Scarry
- Big Nate Shorts (2023)
- California Dreams (1999–2002)
- The Casagrandes (2020–2023)
- Camp Orange (2012)
- Cardcaptor Sakura (2001)
- ChalkZone (2003–2011)
- Clangers
- Clarissa Explains It All (1993–1997; 2010)
- Clueless
- Complete Savages (2005–2007)
- Cousins for Life
- Cousin Skeeter (1999–2002, 2010)
- Count Duckula (1994–1998)
- The Country Mouse and the City Mouse Adventures (1998–2002)
- Crime Time
- The Crystal Maze (US) (2020)
- Crystal Tipps and Alistair (1997–2000)
- Cubeez (2004)
- Dance Academy (2013)
- Danger Force: Shorts (2021)
- Danger Force: Super Charged (2020-2021)
- Danny Phantom (2004-2010)
- Darcy's Wild Life (2005–2007)
- Dawn Patrol
- Denver, the Last Dinosaur (1994–1997)
- Dig & Dug with Daisy (1993–2000)
- Dino Babies
- Dora the Explorer (2004–2011)
- Dorg Van Dango (August 2020-November 2020)
- Doug (1994–2010)
- Dr. Zitbag's Transylvania Pet Shop
- Dragon Tales
- Drake & Josh (2004–2012; 2019; 2021)
- Driven Crazy
- Dungeons & Dragons
- El Tigre: The Adventures of Manny Rivera (2007–2009)
- The Elephant Show
- Engie Benjy
- Enid Blyton's Enchanted Lands (1998–1999)
- Eureeka's Castle (1994–1997)
- Extreme Ghostbusters (1998–2004)
- Fireman Sam (1996–1999)
- Fraggle Rock (1993–2001)
- Fraggle Rock: The Animated Series (2003–2004)
- The Fresh Prince of Bel-Air (2011–2013)
- Galaxy High School (1994–1995)
- Garbage Pail Kids
- Genie in the House
- George of the Jungle (1994–1995)
- Get The Picture (1993–1994)
- Gilmore Girls (2003–2004)
- Girls In Love (2003–2005)
- Nickelodeon Guts
- Go, Diego, Go!
- Goldie's Oldies (2021–2023)
- Gormiti
- Gortimer Gibbon's Life on Normal Street
- Grizzly Tales for Gruesome Kids (2011–2012)
- Group Chat (2020–2021)
- Guinevere Jones
- Gullah Gullah Island (1995–2002)
- Guys Like Us
- Hairy Jeremy (1996–1999)
- The Hardy Boys/Nancy Drew Mysteries (1995–1996)
- Help! I'm a Teenage Outlaw
- Henry's Cat (1994–1999)
- The Herbs (1995–2001)
- Hey Dude (1993–1994)
- Horrid Henry (2020–2023)
- How to Rock
- The Hoobs (Originally Also on Channel 4)
- Huxley Pig (1997–1999)
- I Spy
- Insektors (1997–2000)
- Instant Mom
- Instant Star
- Invader Zim (2002–2004)
- Ivor the Engine (1995–2001)
- James the Cat (1993–2001)
- Jim Henson's Animal Show (1995–1998)
- Jimbo and the Jet-Set (1994–2000)
- Joe (1995–2001)
- Joe 90 (1994–1995)
- Jordan & Perri's Ultimate Block Party (2013)
- The Journey of Allen Strange
- Jumanji (1996–1998)
- Just Add Magic (2018–2023)
- Just Jordan (2007–2008)
- KaBlam! (1996–2000)
- Kappa Mikey (2006–2008)
- Katie and Orbie (1993–1997)
- Kenan & Kel (1997–2012)
- King (2003–2006)
- King Arthur's Disasters (2005–2007)
- King Rollo (1995–2001)
- Kipper
- Kissyfur (1995–1996)
- Kitu and Woofl (1997–1999)
- Knight Squad (2018–2021)
- Kung Fu Panda: Legends of Awesomeness (2011–2015)
- Land of the Lost (1991 series) (1994–1995)
- The Legend of Korra (2013–2015; 2020)
- Legends of the Hidden Temple (1993–1994)
- Life with Boys (2011–2014)
- Little Bear (1997–2002)
- Little Bill (2000-2004)
- Littlest Pet Shop (1995–1996)
- Lizzie's Library (1997–2000)
- Magic Adventures of Mumfie (1997–2002)
- The Magic House (1996–2002)
- Magic Mountain (1998–2000)
- The Magic School Bus (1995–2000)
- Maisy
- Make It Pop
- Mako: Island of Secrets
- Marvin Marvin (2013–2014)
- Mary-Kate and Ashley in Action!
- Massive Monster Mayhem
- Max & Shred
- Max Glick (1994)
- Mia and Me (2014)
- Middlemost Post (9 April 2022 – 24 December 2023)
- Middlemost Post – Shorts (7 September 2021 – 23 September 2021) (Originally also airing on Nicktoons)
- The Mighty B! (2008 – 14 February 2010)
- Mighty Max (1994–1997)
- Mighty Morphin Power Rangers (2011–2014)
- Mission Top Secret (1994-1995)
- Moesha (1996–2001)
- Mona the Vampire (1999–2006) (Originally also on CBBC)
- The Monkees (1994)
- Monsters vs. Aliens (2013–2015)
- Monty the Dog (1996–1999)
- Moschops (1996–2001)
- Mother Goose and Grimm (1994–1997)
- Mouse and Mole (1996–1999)
- Mr. Bean: The Animated Series
- Mr. Bean (2006–2009)
- Mr Benn (1995–2001)
- Mr. Magoo (1993)
- Mr. Men and Little Miss (1994–2000)
- Muppet Babies (1997–2000)
- The Muppet Show (1994–1997)
- My Brother and Me (1998)
- My Dad the Rock Star (2004)
- My Life as a Teenage Robot (2005)
- My Parents Are Aliens (2005–2010) (Also on CITV until 2017)
- The Naked Brothers Band (2007–2013)
- Naturally, Sadie
- Ned's Declassified School Survival Guide
- The New Adventures of Speed Racer (1994–1995)
- Ni Hao, Kai-Lan (2007–2011)
- Nickelodeon Guts (1993–1996)
- Nick Kicks (2016–2017)
- Nickelodeon UK Kids' Choice Awards (2007–2013)
- Nickelodeon Un-edited (8 September 2021 – 22 September 2021)
- Nicky, Ricky, Dicky & Dawn (2014–2023)
- Noah Knows Best (November 2000 – 2002)
- Noah's Ark (1998–2000)
- Noah's Island (1998–2002)
- Noddy (1996–1999)
- Oakie Doke (1996–1999)
- The Odyssey
- Oh Yeah! Cartoons (1999–2003)
- Old Bear Stories (1997-2001)
- Olive the Ostrich (2011)
- Open Sesame (1997-2002)
- Oscar and Friends
- Oscar's Orchestra (1997–2000)
- Out of Control
- Pablo the Little Red Fox (1999)
- Paddington Bear (1995–2001)
- Papa Beaver's Storytime (1997–2000)
- The Herbs (1997–1999)
- PB Bear and Friends (1998–2001)
- Pee-wee's Playhouse (1993–1996)
- Pelswick (2001–2002)
- The Penguins of Madagascar (2009–2012)
- Peppa Pig (2010–2011)
- Pet Alien (2007–2011)
- Philbert Frog (1993–1995)
- Pic Me
- Pirate Islands
- Planet Sheen (2011–2012)
- Plasmo (1997–1999)
- Playbox (1996–2000)
- Playbus (1996–1999)
- Playdays (1996–1999)
- The Pondles (1993–1995)
- PopPixie (2014)
- Poppy Cat (2011)
- Postman Pat (1996–1999)
- Power Rangers Megaforce (2013–2017)
- Power Rangers Samurai (2011–2016)
- Press Gang (1997)
- Rabbids Invasion (2014)
- Rabbit Ears
- Radio Free Roscoe (2004-2005)
- Rainbow (1994 series) (1999–2002)
- Raising Dad
- The Real Ghostbusters
- The Real Macaw
- Redwall (2000)
- Regal Academy
- The Ren & Stimpy Show (2 May 1994 – 2000) (since 25 August 2022, now airing on Comedy Central)
- Renford Rejects (1998–2020)
- Ricky Sprocket: Showbiz Boy (29 September 2007 – November 2008)
- Roary the Racing Car (23 November 2007 – 25 March 2011)
- Rocket Power (21 May 2000 – 2003; 2004 – 2005)
- Rocko's Modern Life (1994–2001, November 2004 – 2005)
- Romeo! (November 2003 – 2008)
- Roobarb (1993)
- Rotten Ralph (2000–2004)
- Round the Twist (1996–1999)
- Roundhouse (1994–1995)
- Rubbadubbers
- Rude Dog and The Dweebs (1995–1997)
- Rugrats (original series) (1994–2013; 2020) (also airing on NickToons)
- Rugrats (2021) (1 September 2023 – 2024)
- Sabrina the Teenage Witch (1996–January 2006)
- Salute Your Shorts (1993–1994)
- Sanjay and Craig (2013–2014)
- Santo Bugito (1995–1996)
- Saved by the Bell (Original series) (September 2000–February 2008)
- Saved by the Bell: The College Years
- The Secret World of Alex Mack (1995–1999, 2002)
- See Dad Run (2014–2019)
- Sheeep
- Ship to Shore (1994–1996)
- The Shoe People (1995–1999)
- Sister, Sister (1995–2009)
- The Sleepover Club (2004–2010)
- The Smoggies (1994–1996)
- Space Cases
- Space Goofs (2006–28 March 2010)
- Speed Racer (1994–1995)
- Spider! (1996–1999)
- Spider-Man: The New Animated Series (24 April 2004 – 2005)
- Star Trek: Prodigy (2022–2023)
- Stickin' Around (1996–1998)
- The Substitute (2020–2022)
- Supah Ninjas (2011–2014)
- SuperTed (1993–1994)
- Summer in Transylvania (October 2010 – 2012)
- Takeshi's Castle Thailand (2018)
- Taina (October 2001–February 2003, January 2006)
- Tak And The Power Of Juju (2008–2010)
- Takeshi's Castle Thailand (2018–2021)
- Tales from the Cryptkeeper (1997–1999)
- Tales of the Tooth Fairies (1994–1999)
- Team Umizoomi (2010)
- Teenage Mutant Ninja Turtles (1993–1997)
- Teenage Mutant Ninja Turtles (2012–2015, 2023)
- Teletubbies (Original series) (1997–2000)
- Thomas & Friends (1999–2002)
- The Three Friends and Jerry (1999–2009)
- The Tiny Chef Show (13 January 2023)
- Tom Slick (1994)
- Toucan Tecs (1994–1995)
- A Town Called Panic (2005–2006)
- Towser (1994 – 1998)
- The Trap Door
- The Treacle People (2000–2002)
- The Troop (March 2010 – 2014; 2018 - 2020)
- True Jackson, VP (2009–2014; 2021)
- Trumpton (1997–2000)
- Tube Mice (1994–1995)
- Tucker (2001–2004)
- T.U.F.F. Puppy (2011–2014)
- The Twisted Timeline of Sammy & Raj (9 January 2023 - 2024)
- Two of a Kind (1998–2000)
- Ultraman (1994–1995)
  - Ultraman: Towards the Future
- Unfabulous (April 2005 – 18 April 2010)
- Unfiltered (2020–2021)
- Unleashed (2021)
- USA High
- Victor & Maria (1997–1998)
- Visionaries: Knights of the Magical Light
- Warped! (2022)
- Wayside (27 June 2008 – 13 February 2009)
- Weinerville (1993–1994)
- Welcome Freshmen (1993)
- What I Like About You
- Where on Earth Is Carmen Sandiego? (1994–1997)
- Wiggly Park (1998–2001)
- Wil Cwac Cwac (1993–2000)
- The Wild Side Show
- William's Wish Wellingtons (1996–1999)
- Willo the Wisp (1995–1999)
- Winx Club (2004–2006; 2011–2021)
- Wimzie's House (1997–2000)
- Wishbone (1996–1998)
- WITS Academy
- The Wombles (1995–2001)
- Wonder Pets! (September 2009 – 2010)
- The Wild Thornberrys (17 November 1998 – 2004 – 2005; 3–31 August 2020)
- The World of David the Gnome (1993–1996)
- The World of Tosh (2004 – November 2006)
- The Worst Witch (2003–2005)
- Wow! Wow! Wubbzy! (13 August 2007 – December 2008)
- The Wubbulous World of Dr. Seuss (1997–2000)
- The X's (2006 – 12 December 2010)
- Yakkity Yak (2004 – 2005)
- You Do Too (2003 – 2007)
- You Gotta See This (12 January 2013 – 17 August 2014)
- Yu-Gi-Oh! (June 2002 – 2005)
- Zoey 101 (June 2005 – October 2008 – December 2009; 2011 – 2012; 2022)

== Programming blocks ==
=== Current blocks ===
- Thank Nick It's Friday (August 2001 – August 2002; 11 September 2020 – present)
- Toons On Toast (6 June 2022 – present; Originally On Nicktoons)
- After School Club (5 September 2022 – Present)

=== Former blocks ===
- Nick Jr. (1993 – July 2000)
- CBBC on Nickelodeon (1996 – 1999)
- Nick at Nite (27 June 2016 – 2019)

== See also ==
- Nick Jr.
- Nicktoons
- Channel 5
- Milkshake!
