= List of programmes broadcast by Nicktoons (UK & Ireland) =

This is a list of television programmes formerly and currently broadcast by the British & Irish children's television channel Nicktoons, a sister network to Nickelodeon.

== Current programming ==
=== Acquired from Nickelodeon (US) ===
- Kamp Koral: SpongeBob's Under Years (2023–present)
- The Loud House (2016–present)
- SpongeBob SquarePants (2002–present)
- Super Duper Bunny League (2025–present)

=== Acquired programming ===
- ALVINNN!!! and the Chipmunks (2016–present)
- The Smurfs (2021–present)

== Former programming ==
=== Original programming ===
- Nick Kicks (2016–2017)

==== Acquired from Nickelodeon (UK) ====
- Renford Rejects (2011)
- The Twisted Timeline of Sammy & Raj (2023)

=== Acquired from Nickelodeon (US) ===
- Aaahh!!! Real Monsters (2002–2011)
- The Adventures of Jimmy Neutron, Boy Genius (2002–2013)
- The Adventures of Kid Danger (2018–2019; 2021)
- All Grown Up! (2004–2010; 2017)
- The Amanda Show (2011)
- The Angry Beavers (2002–2010)
- As Told by Ginger (2002–2008)
- Avatar: The Last Airbender (2006–2017; 2020–2023; 2025–2026)
- Back at the Barnyard (2008–2014)
- The Barbarian and the Troll (2021)
- Blaze and the Monster Machines (2020)
- Breadwinners (2014–2020)
- Bunsen Is a Beast (2017–2020)
- The Casagrandes (2020–2024)
- CatDog (2002–2013)
- Catscratch (2006–2010)
- ChalkZone (2003–2008)
- Danny Phantom (2004–2014; 2020)
- Dora (premiere only, 2024)
- Doug (2002–2010)
- Drake & Josh (2010–2012)
- El Tigre: The Adventures of Manny Rivera (2007–2011)
- The Fairly OddParents (2002–2022)
- Fanboy & Chum Chum (2010–2017)
- Harvey Beaks (2015–2018)
- Hey Arnold! (2002–2017)
- Invader Zim (2002–2017)
- It's Pony (2020–2022)
- KaBlam! (2002–2005)
- Kenan & Kel (2011)
- Kung Fu Panda: Legends of Awesomeness (2011–2016; 2020–2021; 2023–2026)
- The Legend of Korra (2013–2015; 2020–2023)
- Max & the Midknights (2024–2025)
- Middlemost Post (2021–2022)
- The Mighty B! (2009–2013)
- Monsters vs. Aliens (2013–2016)
- Monster High (2022-2023)
- Mr. Meaty (2007–2008)
- My Life as a Teenage Robot (2005–2008)
- Ned's Declassified School Survival Guide (2010–2012)
- Oh Yeah! Cartoons (2002–2005)
- The Patrick Star Show (2021-2026)
- The Penguins of Madagascar (2009–2016)
- Pig Goat Banana Cricket (2018–2021)
- Planet Sheen (2011–2016)
- The Really Loud House (2023-2024)
- The Ren & Stimpy Show (2002–2017)
- Rise of the Teenage Mutant Ninja Turtles (2018–2020)
- Robot and Monster (2013–2016)
- Rocket Power (2002–2011)
- Rock Paper Scissors (2024–2025; 2026)
- Rocko's Modern Life (2002–2017)
- Rubble & Crew (premiere only) (2023)
- Rugrats (2002–2022)
- Sanjay and Craig (2013–2022)
- Supah Ninjas (2012)
- Super Duper Bunny League (2025–2026)
- Tak and the Power of Juju (2008–2013)
- Tales of the Teenage Mutant Ninja Turtles (2024–2026)
- Teenage Mutant Ninja Turtles (2012-2018; 2022–2023)
- The Thundermans: Undercover (premiere only, 2025)
- The Tiny Chef Show (2022–2023)
- The Troop (2010–2012)
- T.U.F.F. Puppy (2011–2016)
- Welcome to the Wayne (2018–2019)
- The Wild Thornberrys (2002–2008; 2017)
- Wylde Pak (2026)
- The X's (2006–2008)

=== Acquired from Paramount+ ===
- Big Nate (2023–2024)
- Star Trek: Prodigy (2022–2023)
- Transformers: EarthSpark (2022–2023)

=== Acquired programming ===
- 44 Cats (2020–2021)
- Animal Crackers (2002–2004)
- Arthur (2002–2004)
- Beyblade: Metal Fury (2014–2015)
- Beyblade: Metal Fusion (2010–2012)
- Beyblade: Metal Masters (2012–2014)
- Big Blue (2021–2023)
- Big Guy and the Rusty the Boy Robot (2004)
- Dan Dare: Pilot of the Future (2004–2006)
- Dorg Van Dango (2020–2022)
- Earthworm Jim (2002–2009)
- Edgar & Ellen (2007–2009)
- George of the Jungle (2007–2010)
- Get Blake! (2015–2019)
- The Gnoufs (2002–2006)
- Gormiti (2009–2015)
- Grizzly Tales for Gruesome Kids (2010–2018)
- Growing Up Creepie (2007–2010)
- Horrid Henry (2018–2023)
- Huntik: Secrets & Seekers (2013–2014)
- Kappa Mikey (2006–2009)
- King (2004–2009)
- King Arthur's Disasters (2006–2011)
- Lego City Adventures (2019-2021)
- Massive Monster Mayhem (2018–2019)
- Matt Hatter Chronicles (2011–2015)
- Max Steel (2013–2015)
- Mix Master (2007–2009)
- Mona the Vampire (2002–2003)
- Monsuno (2012–2014)
- Mr. Bean: The Animated Series (2004–2010)
- Mr. Magoo (2020–2023)
- My Dad the Rock Star (2005–2006)
- Mysticons (2017-2018)
- Open Season: Call of Nature (2025–2026)
- Oggy and the Cockroaches (2014-2018)
- Ollie's Pack (2020-2023)
- Pelswick (2002–2005)
- Pet Alien (2007–2011)
- Rabbids Invasion (2014–2019)
- Rainbow Butterfly Unicorn Kitty (2019)
- Ricky Sprocket: Showbiz Boy (2008–2010)
- Rocket Monkeys (2013–2018)
- Ryan's Mystery Playdate (2020)
- Sonic Prime (2025–2026)
- Space Goofs (2005–2008)
- The Spectacular Spider-Man (2008)
- Spliced (2009–2013)
- The Super Hero Squad Show (2009–2012)
- The Three Friends and Jerry (2004–2010)
- ToonMarty (2017–2018)
- Transformers: Animated (2008–2012)
- Viva Piñata (2007–2009)
- Wayside (2008–2009)
- Winx Club (2005–2008)
- Yakkity Yak (2003–2006)
- Yu-Gi-Oh! (2002–2011)
- Yu-Gi-Oh! GX (2006–2011)
- Zokie of Planet Ruby (2025)

== See also ==
- List of programmes broadcast by Nickelodeon (British and Irish TV channel)
