= Tony Russell (musician) =

English jazz musician (1929–1970)

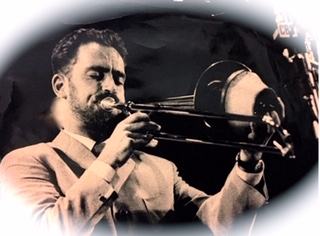
- Born: Keith Anthony Ceasar Russell; 24 May 1929 London, England
- Died: 20 July 1970 (aged 41) London, England
- Occupation: Jazz trombonist, arranger and composer
- Genre: Jazz, big band, theatre music
- Notable works: On The Buses theme tune, The Matchgirls musical, The Herbs children's TV series, Missa Brevis by K. A. Russell
- Relatives: Michael Russell (half-brother)

Keith Anthony Caesar Russell (24 May 1929 – 20 July 1970), known as Tony Russell, was an English jazz musician and composer, pianist and trombonist. Notably, he worked extensively with Johnny Dankworth and created the score for The Matchgirls, together with writing theme tunes and background music for TV series such as On the Buses and the children's programme The Herbs. He also composed the music for The Herbs' spin-off, The Adventures of Parsley. At the end of his life, he turned from the jazz idiom to write a setting of a Mass.

== Early life ==
Tony Russell was born 24 May 1929 in Wanstead, Essex, England. As a youth, he became very interested in jazz, learning the trombone, baritone horn and piano. Russell was the half-brother of geologist Michael Russell, and the half-siblings are distantly related to German opera composer Giacomo Meyerbeer.

== Career ==
Russell's jazz career began at the age of 15, when he played as a New Orleans-style trombonist with the London-based Washington and Lee Swing, George Webb's Dixilanders George Webb. In 1946 he formed the pioneering trad band, the Russell-Wickham Hot Six, which he led with the trumpeter Alan Wickham. At this time he was known as Rag's Russell because he played a little ragtime on the piano. In the fledgling years of his career, he also performed vocals.

He played with Vic Lewis, Oscar Rabin, Ralph Sharon, Jack Parnell and Tony Crombie. In 1957 he led a band of his own, after which, he began his association with Johnny Dankworth, first as a trombonist in his big band. Here he had the opportunity to both arrange and compose - a favourite jazz piece often included in performances was Russell's "Joe And Lol's Blues". He recorded quite extensively with the band from December 1956 and can be heard on most of the bands Parlophone, Columbia, Top Rank and Fontana albums. He was the band's road manager for many years. In 1959 he went with the band to play at the Newport Jazz Festival.

Russell studied composition with Richard Rodney Bennett and Bill Russo. He was in Russo's London Jazz Orchestra and took over running this when Russo returned to the United States in 1965. In his later years, Russell became busier as a composer and won acclaim in 1966 for writing the score for the musical Matchgirls, which has enjoyed longevity into the 21st century. In this same year, with Johnny Dankworth and Johnny Flanagan, he formed Music Activity Management Ltd. Russell continued to play in the band and on sessions for other leaders. He also wrote music for shows and TV series such as On the Buses, and the children's programme The Herbs.

Russell suffered for many years with Hodgkin's disease. During his final illness, he was commissioned to compose a Mass, a Missa Brevis, which was completed shortly before he died. In his final composition, he moves from an overt jazz idiom, to encompass classical features of vocal scoring and instrumentation. "The Russell Mass" stands somewhere between the jazz, classical and popular styles of the 20th century.

Russell appeared in Terence Donovan's 1967 photograph taken in Trafalgar Square, featuring 39 musicians.

== Personal life and death ==
Russell met and married Angela Esposito in 1950; the couple had five children together. He also had a child from an earlier relationship. Russell died on 20 July 1970, aged 41.
