= Michael Bond =

English author (1926–2017)

Michael Bond CBE
- Born: Thomas Michael Bond; 13 January 1926; Newbury, Berkshire, England
- Died: 27 June 2017 (aged 91); London, England
- Resting place: Paddington Old Cemetery
- Occupation: Author
- Years active: 1945–2017
- Notable work: Paddington Bear series
- Spouses: Brenda Mary Johnson (m. 1950; div. 1981); Susan Marfrey Rogers (m. 1981)
- Children: 2

Thomas Michael Bond (13 January 1926 – 27 June 2017) was an English author. He is best known for a series of children's books featuring the character of Paddington Bear. More than 35 million books in the series have been sold worldwide, and the characters have also appeared in several animated television series, a film series, and a stage musical.

== Early life ==
Thomas Michael Bond was born on 13 January 1926 in Newbury, Berkshire. He grew up in Reading, where his visits to Reading railway station to watch the Cornish Riviera Express pass through at speed started a love of trains. His father was a manager for the post office. He was educated at Presentation College in Reading. His time there was unhappy. He told The Guardian in November 2014 that his parents had chosen the school "for the simple reason [that his] mother liked the colour of the blazers ... she didn't make many mistakes in life, but that was one of them". He left education aged 14, despite his parents' wishes for him to go to university. The Second World War was under way and he went to work in a solicitor's office for a year, and then as an engineer's assistant for the BBC.

On 10 February 1943 Bond survived an air raid in Reading. The building in which he was working collapsed under him, killing 41 people and injuring many more. Shortly afterwards he volunteered for aircrew service in the Royal Air Force as a 17-year-old, but he was discharged after being found to suffer from acute air sickness. He then served in the Middlesex Regiment of the British Army until 1947.

== Author ==
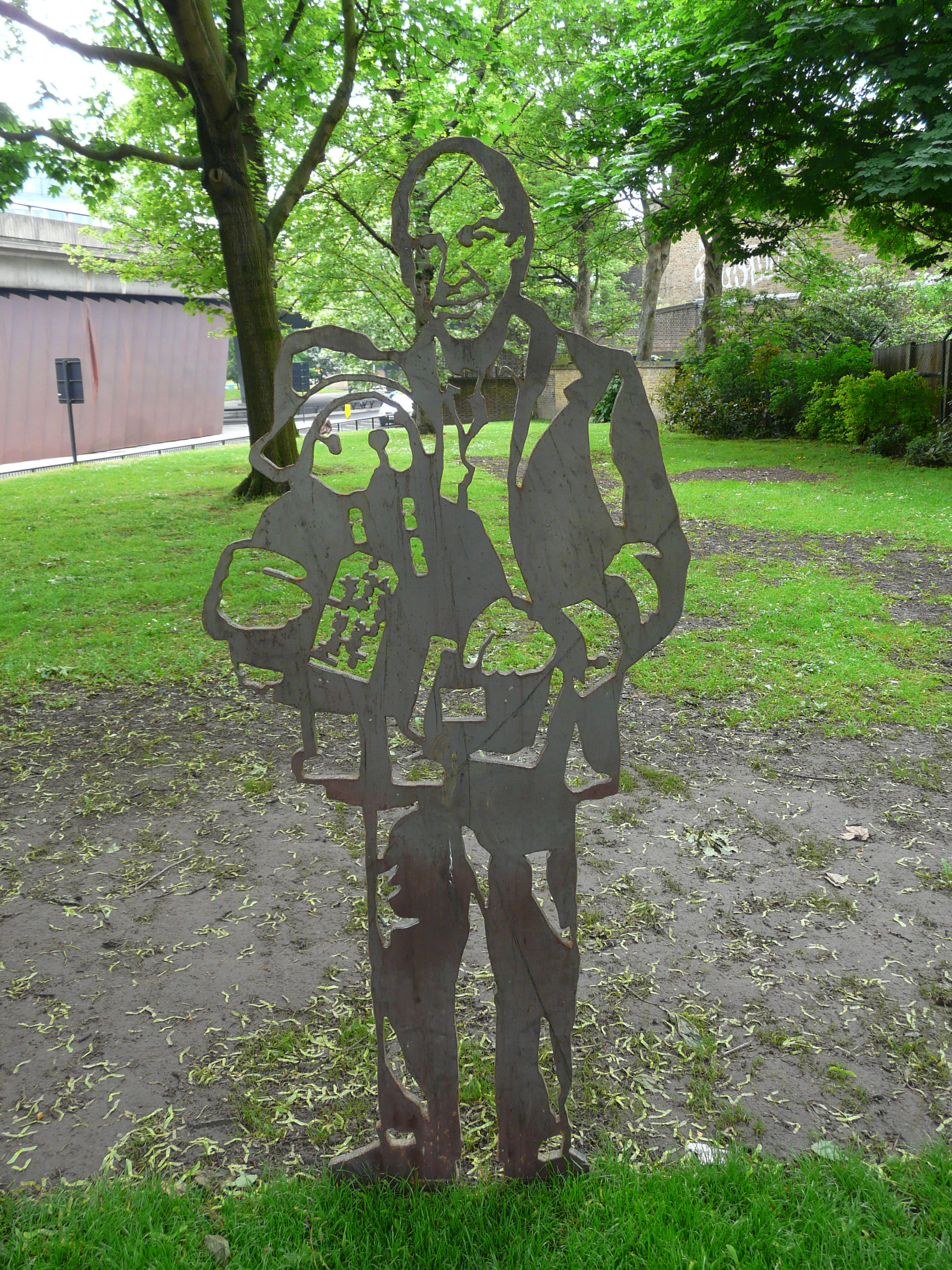
Art installation depicting Bond in Saint Mary's Square, Paddington, with Paddington Bear

Bond began writing in 1945, when he was stationed with the Army in Cairo, and sold his first short story to the magazine London Opinion. He was paid seven guineas and thought that he "wouldn't mind being a writer". After he'd produced several plays and short stories and had become a BBC television cameraman (he worked on Blue Peter for a time), his first book, A Bear Called Paddington, was published by Collins in 1958. Barbara Ker Wilson had read his draft at one sitting and she then phoned Bond at the number given. She was put through to Lime Grove Studios. Bond had to tell her that he wasn't supposed to take calls at work.

This was the start of Bond's series of books recounting the tales of Paddington Bear, a spectacled bear from "darkest Peru", whose Aunt Lucy sends him to the United Kingdom, carrying a jar of marmalade. In the first book the Brown family find the bear at Paddington Station, and adopt him, naming the bear after the station. By 1965 Bond was able to give up his BBC job to work full time as a writer.

Paddington's adventures have sold over 35 million books, have been published in nearly 20 countries, in over 40 languages, and have inspired pop bands, race horses, plays, hot air balloons, movies and adaptations for television. Bond stated in December 2007 that he did not plan to continue the adventures of Paddington Bear in further volumes, but in April 2014 it was reported that a new book, entitled Love From Paddington, would be published that autumn. In Paddington, a 2014 film based on the books, Bond had a credited cameo as the Kindly Gentleman.

Bond also wrote another series of children's books, telling of the adventures of a guinea pig named Olga da Polga, who was named after the Bond family's pet, as well as the animated BBC television series The Herbs (1968). Bond also wrote culinary mystery stories for adults, featuring Monsieur Pamplemousse and his faithful bloodhound Pommes Frites.

Bond wrote Reflection on the Passing of the Years shortly after his 90th birthday. The piece was read by Sir David Attenborough, who also turned 90 in 2016, at the national service of thanksgiving to commemorate Queen Elizabeth II's 90th birthday at St Paul's Cathedral in June 2016.

On 20 June 2016 StudioCanal acquired the Paddington franchise outright. Bond was allowed to keep the publishing rights to his series, which he licensed in April 2017 to HarperCollins for the next six years.

== Television writing ==
Bond wrote two short films for the BBC: Simon's Good Deed, which was shown on 11 October 1955, and Napoleon's Day Out, shown on 9 April 1957. He also wrote one episode of the series The World Our Stage, an adaptation of the short story "The Decoration" by Guy de Maupassant, which aired on 4 January 1958.

His best known television work is as the creator and writer of the children's television series The Herbs and The Adventures of Parsley, again for the BBC.

== Honours ==
Bond was appointed an Officer of the Order of the British Empire (OBE), for services to children's literature, in the 1997 Birthday Honours and Commander of the Order of the British Empire (CBE) in the 2015 Birthday Honours. On 6 July 2007 the University of Reading awarded him an Honorary Doctor of Letters.

On 10 January 2018 GWR named one of their Class 800 trains "Michael Bond / Paddington Bear".

== Personal life and death ==
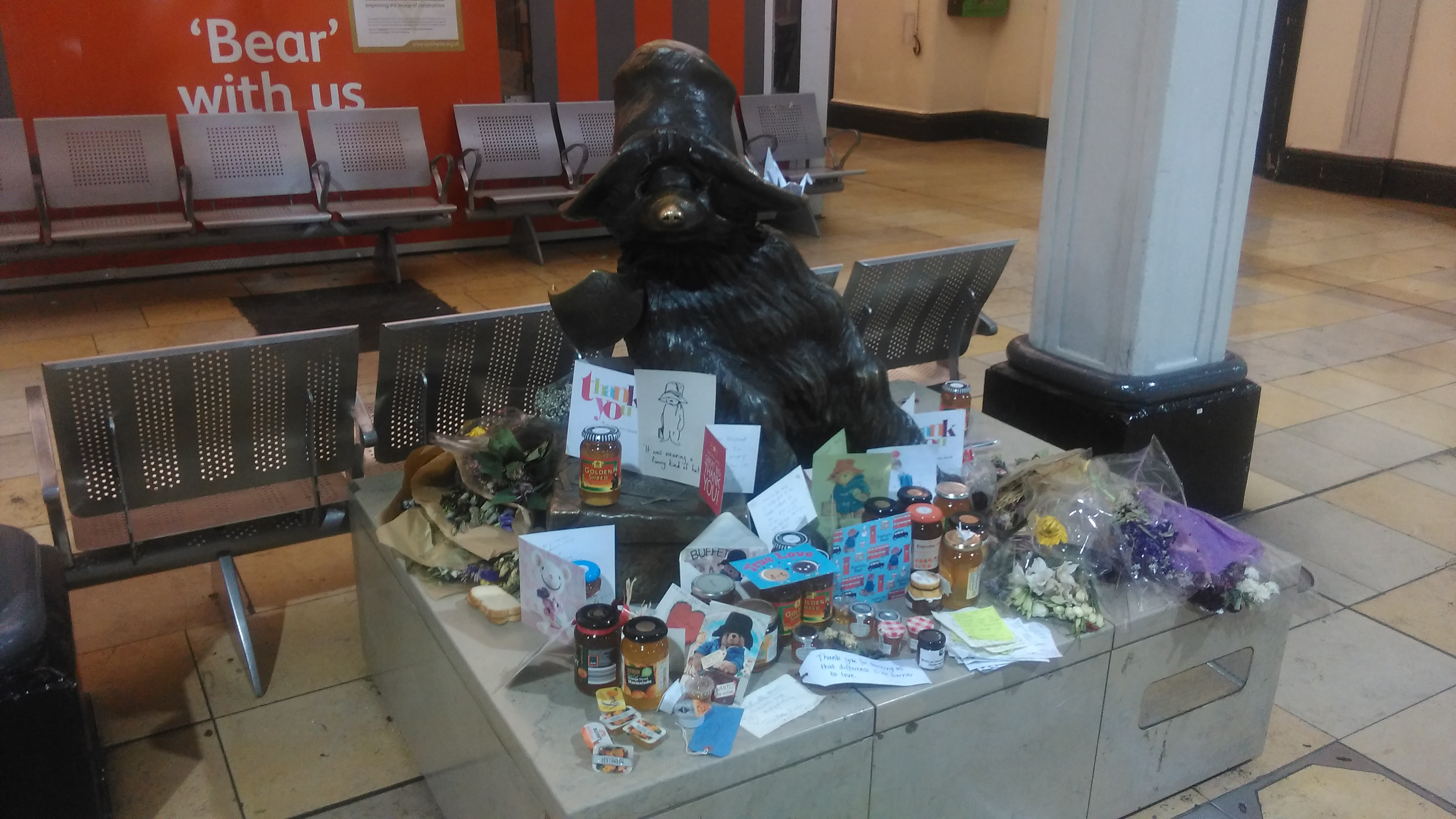
Statue of Paddington Bear in Paddington Station following Michael Bond's death.

Bond was married twice: to Brenda Mary Johnson in 1950, from whom he separated in the 1970s before divorcing in 1981; and to Susan Marfrey Rogers in 1981. He had two children. He lived in Little Venice, London, not far from Paddington Station, the place that inspired many of his books.

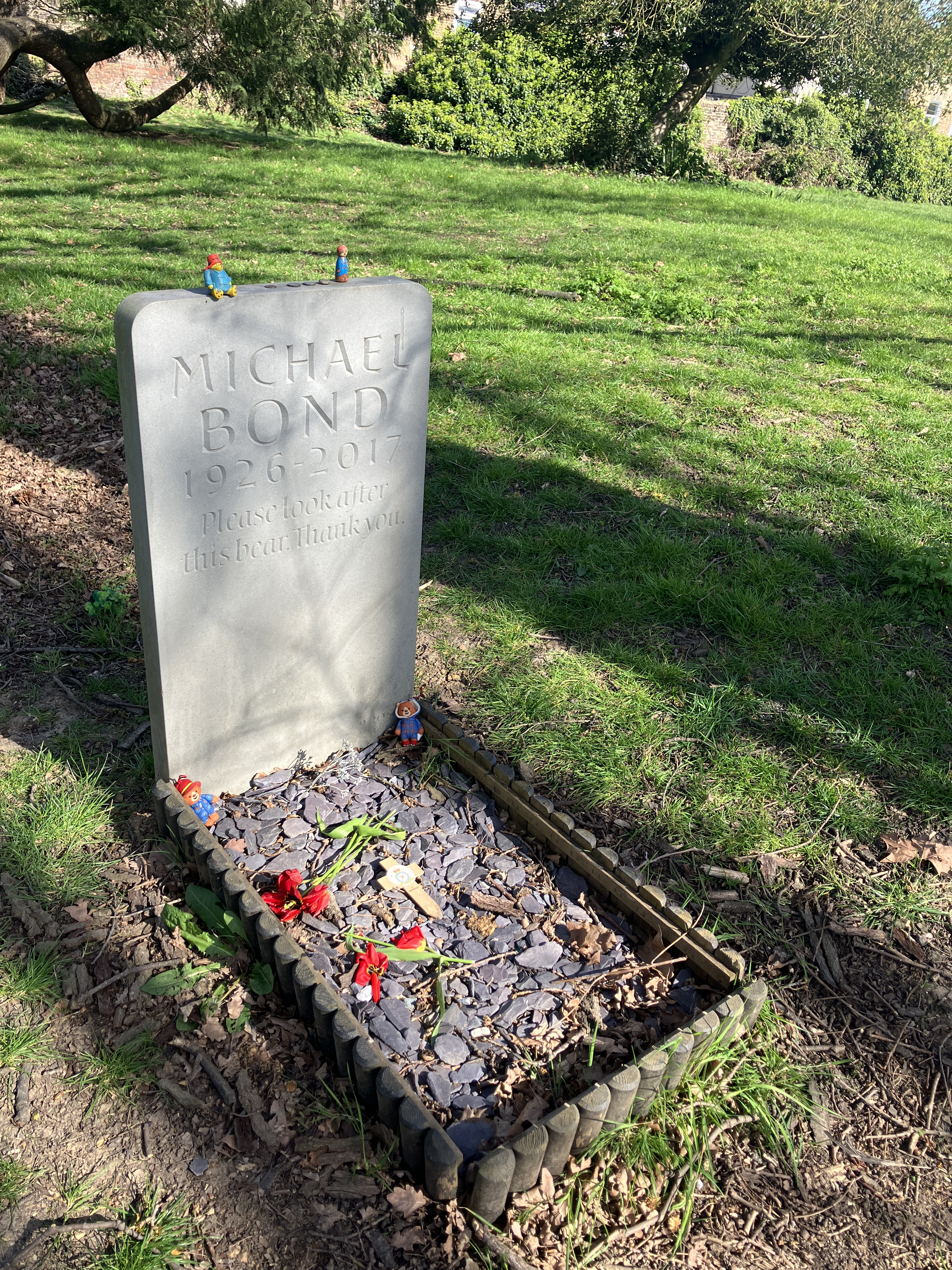
Gravestone of Michael Bond in Paddington Old Cemetery

Bond died at home on 27 June 2017, at the age of 91, following a brief, undisclosed illness. The film Paddington 2 (2017) was dedicated to his memory. In accordance with his wishes, he is buried in Paddington Old Cemetery, section 3S. The epitaph on his gravestone reads "Please look after this bear. Thank you."

In 2022, on the ITV programme DNA Journeys, it was discovered that Bond is a relative of the television presenter Kate Garraway.

== Bibliography ==
=== Paddington Bear series ===
- 1958 A Bear Called Paddington. London: Collins.
- 1959 More About Paddington. London: Collins.
- 1960 Paddington Helps Out. London: Collins.
- 1961 Paddington Abroad. London: Collins.
- 1962 Paddington at Large. London: Collins.
- 1964 Paddington Marches On. London: Collins.
- 1966 Paddington at Work. London: Collins.
- 1968 Paddington Goes to Town. London: Collins.
- 1969 Paddington's Birthday Book. London: Collins.
- 1970 Paddington Takes the Air. London: Collins. ISBN 0-00-675379-5
- 1972 Paddington's Garden. London: Collins. ISBN 0-394-82643-4
- 1973 Paddington's Blue Peter Story Book (sometimes titled as Paddington Takes to TV). London: Collins. ISBN 0-563-12356-7
- 1974 Paddington on Top. London: Collins. ISBN 0-00-675377-9
- 1975 Paddington at the Tower. London: Collins. ISBN 0-00-734141-5
- 1979 Paddington Takes the Test. London: Collins. ISBN 0-06-231240-5
- 1980 Paddington on Screen. London: Collins. ISBN 0-440-40029-5
- 1984 Paddington at the Zoo. London: Collins. ISBN 0-00-664744-8
- 1986 Paddington at the Palace. New York: Putnam. ISBN 0-00-710440-5
- 1987 Paddington's Busy Day. London: Collins. ISBN 0-00-181182-7
- 1992 A Day by the Sea. London: Young Lions (imprint of HarperCollins). ISBN 0-00-674310-2
- 2001 Paddington in the Garden. London: Collins. ISBN 0-06-231844-6
- 2003 Paddington and the Grand Tour. London: Collins. ISBN 0-00-712313-2
- 2008 Paddington Rules the Waves. New York: HarperCollins. ISBN 978-0-00-726765-1
- 2008 Paddington Here and Now. New York: HarperCollins. ISBN 978-0-06-147364-7
- 2012 Paddington Races Ahead. New York: HarperCollins. ISBN 978-0-00-745884-4
- 2012 Paddington Goes for Gold. New York: HarperCollins. ISBN 978-0-00-745884-4
- 2014 Love From Paddington. New York: HarperCollins. ISBN 978-0-06-236816-4
- 2017 Paddington's Finest Hour. New York: HarperCollins. ISBN 978-0-06-266972-8
- 2018: Paddington at St Paul's. New York: HarperCollins.
- 2018: Paddington Turns Detective and Other Funny Stories. London: HarperCollins. ISBN 978-0-00-827980-6

=== Olga da Polga series ===
==== Chapter books ====
- 1971 The Tales of Olga da Polga. ISBN 0-14-030500-9
- 1973 Olga Meets Her Match. ISBN 0-582-16042-1
- 1976 Olga Carries On. ISBN 0-7226-5230-5
- 1982 Olga Takes Charge. ISBN 0-7226-5779-X
- 1987 The Complete Adventures of Olga Da Polga (omnibus). ISBN 0-440-00981-2
- 1993 The Adventures of Olga Da Polga (omnibus). ISBN 0-14-036502-8
- 2001 Olga Moves House. ISBN 0-19-275129-8
- 2002 Olga Follows Her Nose. ISBN 0-19-275246-4
- 2002 The Best of Olga Da Polga (omnibus). ISBN 0-19-275256-1

==== Picture books ====
- 1975 Olga Counts Her Blessings. ISBN 0-14-050148-7
- 1975 Olga Makes a Friend. ISBN 0-14-050152-5
- 1975 Olga Makes a Wish. ISBN 0-14-050146-0
- 1975 Olga Makes Her Mark. ISBN 0-14-050149-5
- 1975 Olga Takes a Bite. ISBN 0-14-050150-9
- 1975 Olga's New Home. ISBN 0-14-050147-9
- 1975 Olga's Second House. ISBN 0-14-050151-7
- 1975 Olga's Special Day. ISBN 0-14-050153-3
- 1983 The First Big Olga da Polga Book (omnibus). ISBN 0-582-25063-3
- 1983 The Second Big Olga da Polga Book (omnibus). ISBN 0-582-25064-1

=== Monsieur Pamplemousse series ===
- 1983 Monsieur Pamplemousse. ISBN 0-340-33142-9
- 1985 Monsieur Pamplemousse and the Secret Mission. ISBN 0-340-36034-8
- 1986 Monsieur Pamplemousse on the Spot. ISBN 0-340-37364-4
- 1987 Monsieur Pamplemousse Takes the Cure. ISBN 0-340-40331-4
- 1989 Monsieur Pamplemousse Aloft. ISBN 0-449-90455-5
- 1990 Monsieur Pamplemousse Investigates. ISBN 0-340-51341-1
- 1991 Monsieur Pamplemousse Rests His Case. ISBN 0-449-90639-6
- 1992 Monsieur Pamplemousse Stands Firm. ISBN 0-7472-3849-9
- 1992 Monsieur Pamplemousse on Location. ISBN 0-7472-0673-2
- 1993 Monsieur Pamplemousse Takes the Train. ISBN 0-7472-0935-9
- 1998 Monsieur Pamplemousse Omnibus Volume One. ISBN 0-7490-0352-9
- 1999 Monsieur Pamplemousse Omnibus Volume Two. ISBN 0-7490-0442-8
- 1999 Monsieur Pamplemousse Afloat. ISBN 0-7490-0347-2
- 1999 Monsieur Pamplemousse Omnibus Volume Three. ISBN 0-7490-0442-8
- 2000 Monsieur Pamplemousse on Probation. ISBN 0-7490-0463-0
- 2002 Monsieur Pamplemousse on Vacation. ISBN 0-7490-0532-7
- 2003 Monsieur Pamplemousse Hits the Headlines. ISBN 0-7490-0622-6
- 2006 Monsieur Pamplemousse and the Militant Midwives. ISBN 0-7490-8277-1
- 2007 Monsieur Pamplemousse and the French Solution. ISBN 978-0-7490-8022-8
- 2011 Monsieur Pamplemousse and the Carbon Footprint. ISBN 978-0-7490-0908-3
- 2015 Monsieur Pamplemousse and the Tangled Web. ISBN 978-0-7490-1626-5

=== Other books ===
- 1966 Here Comes Thursday.
- 1968 Thursday Rides Again.
- 1969 Thursday Ahoy!
- 1971 Thursday in Paris. ISBN 0-245-50647-0
- 1971 Michael Bond's Book of Bears (editor). ISBN 0-361-01738-3
- 1972 The Day the Animals Went on Strike. ISBN 0-289-70187-2
- 1975 Windmill. ISBN 0-289-70452-9
- 1975 How to Make Flying Things (nonfiction). ISBN 0-289-70555-X
- 1975 Mr. Cram's Magic Bubbles (picture book). ISBN 0-14-050072-3
- 1980 Picnic on the River. ISBN 0-00-123538-9
- 1980 J. D. Polson and the Liberty Head Dime. ISBN 0-7064-1381-4
- 1981 J. D. Polson and the Dillogate Affair. ISBN 0-340-27068-3
- 1983 The Caravan Puppets. ISBN 0-00-184135-1
- 1986 Oliver the Greedy Elephant (picture book with Paul Parnes). ISBN 0-307-15242-1
- 1987 The Pleasures of Paris (guidebook). ISBN 1-85145-107-2
- 1988 A Mouse Called Thursday (omnibus). ISBN 1-85152-085-6
- 1992 Something Nasty in the Kitchen (picture book). ISBN 0-00-674311-0
- 1996 Bears and Forebears: A Life So Far (autobiography). ISBN 0-00-255704-5

== Television ==
- 1955 Simon's Good Deed (short film)
- 1957 Napoleon's Day Out (short film)
- 1958 The World Our Stage (one episode, "The Decoration")
- 1968 The Herbs (13 episodes)
- 1970–71 The Adventures of Parsley (32 episodes)
