= Monsieur Pamplemousse =

Fictional detective

Aristide Pamplemousse is the central figure in a series of eighteen comic novels by Michael Bond, published between 1983 and 2015. Pamplemousse (the French word for grapefruit]]) is a fictional former detective of the Sûreté nationale, now employed as an inspector for a French restaurant guide. He and his faithful, intelligent bloodhound, Pommes Frites (Chips or french fries), become involved with, investigate, and solve crime mysteries. In addition to the crimes, the novels are full of culinary detail and descriptions of haute cuisine dishes, in between farcical bedroom-comedy situations in which Monsieur Pamplemousse becomes (mostly) innocently caught up. In the words of The Times, the series is an "engaging mix of farce, detection and cuisine".

== Background ==
By the early 1980s Michael Bond was internationally known as an author of children's stories. His Paddington Bear series, begun 25 years earlier, had been translated into nearly 20 languages, and adapted for stage and screen. His first book for adults, Monsieur Pamplemousse, was published in 1983. It featured Aristide Pamplemousse, a former detective in the Sûreté nationale. The character is at the centre of 17 further Monsieur Pamplemousse novels published over more than two decades, nearly to the end of the author's life; Bond, a Francophile, was inspired while dining in a French restaurant to write about a French detective who became a restaurant critic. A Times article revealed that Bond wrote the novels in Montmartre, where he had an apartment.

== Main characters ==
By the time of his first appearance Pamplemousse has been obliged to retire early from the police service, having been found in compromising – though in fact perfectly innocent – circumstances with fifteen chorus girls at the Folies Bergère. Since then he has been an undercover inspector for France's oldest and most prestigious restaurant guide, known simply as Le Guide, a rival of the Michelin and Gault Millau guides.

Le Guide − wholly fictitious unlike its supposed rivals − is based in the seventh arrondissement of Paris, near Les Invalides. Its Director, Henri Leclercq, lives in some style in a large house on the fringe of Paris, and is something of a snob, adding a q to the surname Leclerc, to make it more distinguished. Many of the novels begin with a request from the Director to Pamplemousse to undertake some extracurricular activity − for the benefit of Leclercq, Le Guide or even La France − from which extravagant complications ensue.

The Director's discreet but influential secretary is an important player at Le Guide, but the dominant female figure in the organisation is the formidable Madame Grante, in charge of Le Guide's finances; Pamplemousse is in recurrent conflict with her over the magnitude of his expenses claims. Despite her forbidding exterior, the widowed Madame Grante is sufficiently susceptible to male charms that in Monsieur Pamplemousse Investigates she has to be rescued from a scheming abductor by Pamplemousse and Pommes Frites.

Pamplemousse and his wife, Doucette – for whom his affectionate pet-name is "Couscous" – live in an apartment in a block of flats in the Rue Girardon, in the Grandes-Carrières district of Montmartre, between the Cimetière de Montmartre and Sacre Coeur. Madame Pamplemousse is tolerant of her husband's perplexing goings-on, although irritated by his untidiness, muddy shoes and stray hairs. She is a good cook, unlike her sister Agathe, whose attempts at tripe à la mode de Caen are for Pamplemousse "a sure recipe for indigestion". His favourite restaurant is Le Maquis, a bistro, in the Rue Caulaincourt (a real restaurant).

The bloodhound Pommes Frites is, like Monsieur Pamplemousse, retired from the police. He had been on attachment to the eighteenth arrondissement, where Monsieur Pamplemousse lives, when he was made redundant following a government cut-back, and the Pamplemousses rescued him from being sent to a dogs' home. Pamplemousse takes him walking in the Parc Monceau. Madame Pamplemousse is as exasperated by the dog's tendency to shed hairs throughout the apartment as she is by her husband's similar failing. Pommes Frites has a nose and palate of great discernment, and is permitted to sit under his master's table in most restaurants. On inspections for Le Guide the two journey all around France in Pamplemousse's old Citroën Deux Chevaux, described by an acquaintance as looking like "a roll-top desk on wheels".

An occasional colleague in Pamplemousse's investigations is an Englishman, Mr Pickering of Burgess Hill, whom Le Guide retains as an adviser "on account of his vast and expert knowledge of wine … a fountain of information, as indeed he was on many other things".

== Plots ==
The publisher's summary of Monsieur Pamplemousse Afloat gives an example of a typical plot involving Pamplemousse and Pommes Frites:

When the Director of Le Guide offers a holiday on the Canal de Bourgogne, Monsieur Pamplemousse is unaware that there are strings attached – several, in fact. Things are not quite as peaceful as they seem among the vineyards of Burgundy, and family rivalries and resentments from long past culminate in a series of strange occurrences. … Before the holiday is over the crime-solving duo will have to cope with the perils of portholes, a dead parrot, missing undergarments, the advances of a Marilyn Monroe lookalike, and an assassin disguised as a nun.

In Monsieur Pamplemousse on the Spot, Pamplemousse is staying at Les Cinq Parfaits, a world-renowned hotel-restaurant on the shores of Lac Leman. One of the proprietors disappears; Pamplemousse comes to the rescue "and in no time at all is up to his eyeballs in trouble – especially when he encounters Fräulein Brünnhilde, gym-mistress at a nearby girls' finishing school, and proud possessor of two magnificently large and undeniably desirable balcons".

For Monsieur Pamplemousse Takes the Cure, the Director sends Pamplemousse to sample a de luxe health farm. In addition to detesting the spartan regime, Pamplemousse begins to suspect something more sinister behind the establishment, with a hearse in daily attendance, and he exposes a cocaine smuggling operation. In Monsieur Pamplemousse on Probation, after the hero's unfortunate collision with a Mother Superior is caught on camera he is sent out of the reach of publicity to report on a chef currently in line for Le Guide's top award, and "opens a can of worms which threatens the very sanctity of France's premier gastronomic bible".

The novels include details of the classic French dishes tasted by Pamplemousse, and on occasion by Pommes Frites, whose palate is put to the test in Monsieur Pamplemousse and the French Solution, in which his skills are shown off in a blind tasting where he distinguishes top quality poulet de Bresse, agneau des Pyrénées and Charolais beef from inferior competitors. Pamplemousse and his dog also sample and opine on wine throughout the series.

== Critical response ==
In 1986 The Guardian referred to "Michael Bond's marvellous Monsieur Pamplemousse" comparing him with another fictional French detective, Inspector Clouseau. Another reviewer in the same year wrote of Monsieur Pamplemousse on the Spot:

The hero of this richly-flavoured mystère gastronomlque has the sort of job lots of foodies would love – an inspector for a gourmet guide. But Pamplemousse never lets the case stand in the way of a gourmet experience, resulting in a nicely-cooked comic novel served with some rich sauce. But Monsieur Pamplemousse is no lemon (citrus fruit joke) and has more than a nose for wine. He is a detective of no mean quality. Accompanied by his dog Pommes Frittes – a hound given to raiding gourmet dustbins with spectacular results in canine flatulence – our hero sets off to find a missing chef.

In the Irish Independent Ruth Dudley Edwards felt that Bond had not fully made the leap from children's fiction to its adult counterpart, "much knowledgeable carry-on about food and wine and jolly sex scenes notwithstanding". The Observer praised "four-star moments among the custard pies". In The Times Marcel Berlins wrote of an "engaging mix of farce, detection and cuisine", but thought Pommes Frites featured too prominently in Monsieur Pamplemousse on the Spot: "next time, grapefruit without chips, please".

== Adaptations ==
The BBC broadcast a serial reading from Monsieur Pamplemousse on the Spot in 1986 and a three-part dramatisation of Monsieur Pamplemousse Investigates in 1995, starring Gorden Kaye as the title character. This version was rebroadcast in 2004, 2006 and 2007. The BBC has recorded audio book versions, narrated by Bill Wallis, of Monsieur Pamplemousse and the French Solution, Monsieur Pamplemousse and the Militant Midwives and Monsieur Pamplemousse Hits the Headlines.

== Monsieur Pamplemousse novels ==
Year	Title	Publisher (all London)	ISBN
1983	Monsieur Pamplemousse	Hodder and Stoughton	ISBN 0-340-33142-9
1984	Monsieur Pamplemousse and the Secret Mission	Hodder and Stoughton	ISBN 0-340-36034-8
1986	Monsieur Pamplemousse on the Spot	Hodder and Stoughton	ISBN 0-340-37364-4
1987	Monsieur Pamplemousse Takes the Cure	Hodder and Stoughton	ISBN 0-340-40331-4
1988	Monsieur Pamplemousse Aloft	Hodder and Stoughton	ISBN 0-449-90455-5
1990	Monsieur Pamplemousse Investigates	Hodder and Stoughton	ISBN 0-340-51341-1
1991	Monsieur Pamplemousse Rests His Case	Headline	ISBN 0-449-90639-6
1991	Monsieur Pamplemousse Stands Firm	Headline	ISBN 0-7472-3849-9
1992	Monsieur Pamplemousse on Location	Headline	ISBN 0-7472-0673-2
1993	Monsieur Pamplemousse Takes the Train	Headline	ISBN 0-7472-0935-9
1999	Monsieur Pamplemousse Afloat	Allison and Busby	ISBN 0-7490-0347-2
2000	Monsieur Pamplemousse on Probation	Allison and Busby	ISBN 0-7490-0463-0
2001	Monsieur Pamplemousse on Vacation	Allison and Busby	ISBN 0-7490-0532-7
2003	Monsieur Pamplemousse Hits the Headlines	Allison and Busby	ISBN 0-7490-0622-6
2006	Monsieur Pamplemousse and the Militant Midwives	Allison and Busby	ISBN 0-7490-8277-1
2007	Monsieur Pamplemousse and the French Solution	Allison and Busby	ISBN 978-0-7490-8022-8
2011	Monsieur Pamplemousse and the Carbon Footprint	Allison and Busby	ISBN 978-0-7490-0908-3
2014	Monsieur Pamplemousse and the Tangled Web	Allison and Busby	ISBN 978-0-7490-1626-5

=== Collections ===
All published by Allison and Busby, London

Year	Title	ISBN	Contains
1998	Monsieur Pamplemousse Omnibus; Volume One	ISBN 0-7490-0352-9	Monsieur Pamplemousse; Monsieur Pamplemousse and the Secret Mission; Monsieur Pamplemousse on the Spot
1999	Monsieur Pamplemousse Omnibus; Volume Two	ISBN 0-7490-0442-8	Monsieur Pamplemousse Takes the Cure; Monsieur Pamplemousse Aloft; Monsieur Pamplemousse Investigates; Monsieur Pamplemousse Rests his Case
1999	Monsieur Pamplemousse Omnibus; Volume Three	ISBN 0-7490-0442-8	Monsieur Pamplemousse Stands Firm; Monsieur Pamplemousse on Location; Monsieur Pamplemousse Takes the Train
