= Jordan Gershowitz =

American television writer and producer

Jordan Seth Gershowitz (born 24 December 1987) is an American Emmy-nominated television writer, executive producer, and author. He is known for his work in children's television and animation, including series for Nickelodeon, Netflix, Disney, Apple TV+, and Warner Bros. He has also published children's books and written licensed comic books.

== Early life and education ==
Gershowitz was born on 24 December 1987, in New Brunswick, New Jersey, and raised in Westampton, New Jersey. He graduated in 2006 from Rancocas Valley Regional High School in Mount Holly, New Jersey. Gershowitz graduated from Indiana University with a degree in telecommunications and a minor from the Kelley School of Business.

== Career ==
=== Early career ===
While attending Indiana University, Gershowitz interned for MTV/Viacom in New York and Warner Bros. in Los Angeles. After graduating, Gershowitz became a page at NBC and also worked for CBS. In 2018, Gershowitz was named to the Tracking Board's Young & Hungry List as one of Hollywood's Top 100 new writers.

=== Television and animation ===
Gershowitz has written and developed content for major studios such as Nickelodeon, Netflix, DreamWorks Animation, Disney, Warner Bros., HBO Max, and the BBC. His writing and development credits include:

- The Twisted Timeline of Sammy & Raj (Nickelodeon) – Developed for Television and Head Writer
- Hot Wheels Let's Race (Netflix) – Developed for Television and Head Writer
- Hot Wheels Let's Race: Attack of the T-Rex (Netflix) - Developed for Television and Written by
- Stuffed Warriors (Warner Bros./Mediacorp) - Developed for Television and Head Writer
- Karters (Mediawan/Warner Bros.) - Executive Producer/Showrunner and Head Writer
- Sharkdog (Netflix/Nickelodeon) – Head Writer for Season 2 and Story Consultant for Season 3
- Thomas & Friends: All Engines Go! (Mattel) – Head Writer on Season 4
- Rubble & Crew (Spin Master/Nickelodeon) – Story consultant for Season 2 and Writer for Seasons 2 - 8
- The Snoopy Show (Apple TV+)
- The Tom and Jerry Show (Warner Bros.)
- Danger Mouse (BBC)
- Monster High (Nickelodeon/Mattel)
- Welcome to the Wayne (Nickelodeon)
- Bunnicula (Warner Bros.)
- Wacky Races (Warner Bros.)
- Sesame Street (HBO Max and Sesame Workshop)
- Where's Waldo? (DreamWorks)
- Battalor – Developed for Television and Head Writer on the upcoming series based on the toyline created by Toikido.

Gershowitz is a 2x Emmy-nominated writer. He was nominated for a Children's and Family Emmy Award for The Tiny Chef Show (Nickelodeon) in the category of Outstanding Writing in a Preschool Series, and for an International Emmy Award for Oddbods (One Animation) in the Best Kids: Animation category.

=== Live Entertainment ===
Gershowitz has penned multiple live stage and arena shows, most notably the 148th edition of Ringling Bros. and Barnum & Bailey "The Greatest Show On Earth," which opened on January 2, 2026. Gershowitz's first live stage show was Sesame Street Live: Make Your Magic, and has since gone on to develop and/or write for experiences with Sesame Place, Disney On Ice, and Disney Junior Live on Tour.

=== Literature ===
Gershowitz is the author of the children's picture book Ignore the Trolls, illustrated by Sandhya Prabhat and published by POW! Kids in 2019. He has also written licensed comic books for Zorro, The Three Stooges. Alongside writer S.A. Check, he co-wrote the officially licensed Laurel & Hardy comic book series for American Mythology Productions. Gershowitz was also the author of Fast & Furious: Spy Racers: From Gears to Gadgets.

=== Film ===
Gershowitz served as executive producer on several independent feature films, including:

- Temps
- Random Tropical Paradise
- The Good Catholic – which won Best Picture at the Santa Barbara International Film Festival.

=== Video Games ===
In 2025, Gershowitz wrote his first video game, Hot Wheels Let's Race: Ultimate Speed, which was based on the Hot Wheels Let's Race franchise he co-developed for Mattel. It is a racing video game, developed by Bamtang Games and published by GameMill Entertainment for Playstation 5, Nintendo Switch, Xbox Series XIS, and PC via Stream.

=== Music ===
Gershowitz was a member of the band Rushmore, which performed on the 2009 Vans Warped Tour after a member of The Maine passed along their demo. Additionally, Rushmore opened for acts such as All Time Low, Cobra Starship, Metro Station, Plain White Ts and Justin Bieber. In 2009, the band was nominated for Best Breakout Artist at the MTV Video Music Awards. He has since written the lyrics to original songs for television on Thomas &Friends: All Engines Go, the theme song to Karters, and live-events such as Ringing Bros. and Barnum & Bailey "The Greatest Show On Earth" and Sesame Street Live.
