= The Matchgirls =

1966 musical

- Music: Tony Russell
- Lyrics: Bill Owen
- Book: Bill Owen
- Basis: London matchgirls strike of 1888.
- Productions: 1965 Leatherhead Theatre Club 1966 Globe Theatre

The Matchgirls is a musical by Bill Owen and Tony Russell about the London matchgirls strike of 1888. It premiered at the Globe Theatre, London, on 1 March 1966, directed and choreographed by Gillian Lynne.

The musical focuses on the lifestyle of the match cutters at the Bryant and May factory in Bow, London, with strong references to the condition Phossy jaw and the political climate of the era.

== Production history ==
After out-of-town tryouts in Leatherhead, Surrey, the show opened in the West End in March 1966. The show closed about three months later.

A cast recording was made of the 1966 Globe Theatre London production. The musical was published by Samuel French Ltd in 1979.

== Synopsis ==
The central character of the musical is Kate, a tenement girl and factory worker, who writes to Annie Besant to ask for help in seeking reform at the Bryant and May factory. The story follows Kate and Annie's attempts to rally the girls, leading Kate to become a reckless strike-leader and a key player in the creation and recognition of the union. With much of the action set in the incongruously named, but fictional, 'Hope Court', the musical portrays Bryant and May as callous and uncaring employers, with factory foreman 'Mr Mynel' representing the threatening and imposing regime in which the girls were forced to work.

There is also a sub plot in which Kate's involvement in the strike puts strain on her relationship with docker Joe.

Despite the subject matter of the musical, a strong emphasis is placed on the positive mentality and natural ebullience of the so-called 'cockney sparrows', this leading to a number of cheerful and entertaining vocal numbers and dance routines.

== Musical numbers ==
- "Phosphorus"
- "Look at That Hat"
- "Look Around"
- "Me"
- "Men"
- "La Di Dah" (only in later versions)
- "Something About You"
- "Mind You Bert"
- "My Dear Lady"
- "We're Gonna Show 'Em"
- "Cockney Sparrers"
- "Life of Mine"
- "Hopping Dance: I Long to See the Day" (not in some later versions)
- "Comes a Time"
- "Amendment to a Motion"
- "Waiting"
- "Life of Mine Reprise (Finale)"
