= Ivor Wood =

British-French animator, director, producer and writer (1932–2004)

- Wood in 1991
- Born: Ivor Sydney Wood; 4 May 1932; Leeds, West Yorkshire, England
- Died: 14 October 2004 (aged 72); London, England
- Occupations: Animator, director, producer, writer
- Years active: 1960–2004
- Spouse: Josiane Wood
- Children: 1

Ivor Sydney Wood (4 May 1932 – 14 October 2004) was a British-French animator, director, producer and writer. He was known for his work on children's television series.

Born in Leeds to an English father and a French mother, his family moved to the mountains near Lyon, France, after the Second World War, where he was educated. He studied fine art in Paris, and later worked in an advertising agency in Paris, where he met Serge Danot. Together they made the acclaimed French series Le Manège enchanté (known in English as The Magic Roundabout), with Wood as the animator.

Following the success of The Magic Roundabout in the UK, Wood partnered with the London-based animation company FilmFair. Wood became both animator and director for a number of FilmFair's animated children's programmes, starting with The Herbs in 1968. During the 1970s, he animated and directed Simon in the Land of Chalk Drawings, Hattytown Tales, The Adventures of Parsley, The Wombles, and Paddington.

== Woodland Animations Limited ==
Woodland Animations Ltd. was founded by Ivor Wood and his wife Josiane, specifically to produce stop-motion animated series for the BBC. The company produced a number of programmes, the earliest and most popular of which was Postman Pat.

=== Content ===
Title	Year(s)	Notes	Format
Postman Pat	1981-1996		Stop Motion
Gran	1983		Stop Motion
Bertha	1985–1986		Stop Motion
Charlie Chalk	1988–1989		Stop Motion
Postman Pat's ABC Story	1990	Co-produced with Abbey Broadcast Communications	Traditional
Postman Pat's 123 Story	1990	Co-produced with Abbey Broadcast Communications	Traditional
Read Along with Postman Pat	1994	Co-produced with Abbey Broadcast Communications	Traditional
