= Kitu and Woofl =

- Genre: Children's television series
- Created by: Kate Henderson
- Directed by: Tim Adlide
- Narrated by: Noni Hazlehurst
- Theme music composer: John Willsteed
- Country of origin: Australia
- Original language: English
- No. of seasons: 1
- No. of episodes: 26

Production
- Executive producer: Phillip Bowman
- Running time: 5 minutes
- Production company: Henderson Bowman Productions

Original release
- Network: ABC TV ABC2
- Release: 6 October – 10 November 1997

Related
- Lizzie's Library

Kitu and Woofl is an Australian children's television series which aired on ABC TV on 6 October 1997 and 10 November 1997 and was repeated until 17 May 2005.

It follows Kitu, a curious, mischievous and friendly little alien who lives on another planet who makes his own adventures along with his best friend and loyal and intelligent pet dog, Woofl.

== Episode list ==
1. "Dadoo's Little Helper"
2. "Kitu Comes Clean"
3. "Kitu Goes Shopping"
4. "Soap Operetta"
5. "The Picnic"
6. "Alien Babysitter"
7. "Tantrum Techniques"
8. "Stray Poofl"
9. "Saying Sorry"
10. "Breakfast In Bed"
11. "First Day"
12. "Tumba Rhumba"
13. "Nit Picking"
14. "Dadoo's Home"
15. "Too Big Too Small"
16. "Time for Bed"
17. "If at First"
18. "Shelvy Boxes"
19. "The Boy Who Cried Wolf"
20. "French Frock Farce"
21. "Nya Nya Nya Nyaaah Nya
22. "The Little Drummer Boy"
23. "The Visit"
24. "Booberry Fields"
25. "Swing Out Sister"
26. "It's My Party"
