= Hattytown Tales =

British children's TV series (1969–1973)

- Title card
- Genre: Children's television series
- Created by: Keith Chatfield
- Written by: Keith Chatfield
- Directed by: Ivor Wood
- Voices of: Keith Chatfield
- Narrated by: Keith Chatfield
- Country of origin: United Kingdom
- Original language: English
- No. of series: 3
- No. of episodes: 39

Production
- Running time: 10 minutes
- Production company: FilmFair

Original release
- Network: ITV
- Release: 1969 – 1973

Hattytown Tales is a 39-episode stop-motion animated children's television series produced by FilmFair for Thames Television, which aired in the United Kingdom between 1969 and 1973. Creator and writer Keith Chatfield narrated the series, and Ivor Wood directed it. Books were published by World Distributors and it was featured in the Playland Comic (offshoot of Pippin) published by Polystyle Publications and in children's annuals for 10 years.

The residents of Hattytown were anthropomorphic hats. The style of hat each character was indicated by their ethnicity, attitude, and role in Hattytown society. For instance, Bobby, the constable, resembles the hat of a constable. Buildings in the town are also hat-shaped; each building's form suggests either its primary function or resident.

The main character, Sancho, is a Mexican sombrero with legs and eyes. Carrots, his best friend, is a donkey with a carrot dangling in front of his face. In one episode, an angry bird makes its nest in Sancho's car. Every time the Hattytown residents try to move the bird, it snaps at them. At the end of the episode, the car door opens to reveal a nest of eggs that eventually hatch.

== Episodes ==
Series 1 (1969)

Some residents of Hattytown

1. Mr Wimple's Breakfast Rolls
2. Bobby's Flower Garden
3. Carrot's Carrot
4. King Ethelbert
5. Milko's Day Off
6. Simon's Magnifying Glass
7. Going Fishing
8. The Statue
9. Sancho's Camera
10. Posty's Old Boots
11. You Cannot Please Everyone
12. Wash Day
13. The King's Portrait

Series 2 (1970)

1. Saving Time
2. Up and Away
3. Creatures of Outer Space
4. Almost Magic
5. The Pillar Box
6. The Royal Hattytown Guards
7. Friendship
8. The Picnic
9. The Cannon
10. Carrots for the Mayor
11. Too Much of a Good Thing
12. Hiccup Buns
13. Bookworms

Series 3 (1973)

1. Bobby's Security Patrol
2. Mr. Bun the Master Baker
3. The Walking Pillar Box
4. The Fete
5. A Note for the Milkman
6. Sneezy Cheese
7. Mrs. Bagwash and the King
8. The Secret Tunnel
9. It Pays to Advertise
10. The Auction
11. The Telephone Box
12. A Taxi for Hire
13. Mustafer the Hedgehog

== International broadcast ==
In the United States, Hattytown Tales was also often featured during the television programme Pinwheel on Nickelodeon.

== Home releases ==
=== VHS ===
On 17 July 1995, Castle Communications released three videos with five episodes on each one. The copyright year on the back cover and the label is mistakenly printed as 1981 even though all 13 Series 1 episodes of Hattytown Tales were broadcast on ATV in 1969 and the first two Series 2 episodes of Hattytown Tales were broadcast on ATV in 1970.

| VHS Title | Catalogue Number | Episodes |
|---|---|---|
| Hatty Town: 5 Classic Adventures | CVS 4054 | "Mr Wimple's Breakfast Rolls"; "Bobby's Flower Garden"; "Carrot's Carrot"; "King Elthelbert"; "Milko's Day Off" |
| Hatty Town: 5 Exciting Episodes | CVS 4055 | "Simon's Magnifying Glass"; "Going Fishing"; "The Statue"; "Sancho's Camera"; "Posty's Old Boots" |
| Hatty Town: 5 Fun Episodes | CVS 4056 | "You Cannot Please Anyone"; "Wash Day"; "The King's Portrait"; "Saving Time"; "Up and Away" |

On 14 May 2001, Contender Entertainment Group released a single video with the first three episodes as part of the company's 'kult kidz' range of classic British children's shows from the 1960s, 1970s and 1980s that were released on video.

| VHS Title | Catalogue Number | Episodes |
|---|---|---|
| Hattytown Tales | KK40026 | "Mr Wimple's Breakfast Rolls"; "Bobby's Flower Garden"; "Carrot's Carrot" |

=== DVD ===
| DVD Title | Catalogue Number | Release Date | Episodes |
|---|---|---|---|
| Hattytown Tales - Mr Wimple's Breakfast Rolls | AHEDVD 3162 | 10 July 2006 | "Mr. Wimple's Breakfast Rolls"; "Bobby's Flower Garden"; "Carrots's Carrot"; "King Ethelbert"; "Milko's Day Off"; "Simon's Magnifying Glass" |
| Hattytown Tales - Going Fishing | AHEDVD 3218 | 26 March 2007 | "Going Fishing"; "The Statue"; "Sancho's Camera"; "Posty's Old Boots"; "You Cannot Please Everyone"; "Wash Day" |
