= Gordon Rollings =

British actor (1926–1985)

- In Carry on Doctor
- Born: Gordon Charles Rollings; 17 April 1926; Batley, England
- Died: 7 June 1985 (aged 59); Bristol, England
- Occupation: Actor
- Years active: 1949–1985

Gordon Charles Rollings (17 April 1926 – 7 June 1985) was an English actor who mainly appeared on television, but also appeared on-stage, radio and in feature films.

== Biography ==
=== Early life ===
Rollings was born in Batley, in the West Riding of Yorkshire, England in 1926 and started his career in radio in Palestine. It was in Palestine while serving in the British Army during the Mandate that he was shot by a sniper of the Stern Gang. He later trained as a clown in Paris, appearing in the Medrano Circus.

=== Entertainment career ===
Rollings made an uncredited screen appearance in the Beatles' film A Hard Day's Night. He played the man in the pub who is shocked to find that Ringo has thrown a dart into his lunch. Director Richard Lester later used him in both Superman films he directed: in the first, he plays a fisherman who is stunned to see General Zod walking on water and in the second, he appears as a pedestrian in a flat cap who upsets a display of toy penguins that triggers the slapstick chaos in the opening credits scene.

After a number of small parts in TV shows such as Z-Cars in the early 1960s, on 21 April 1964, he was the first presenter of BBC 2's daily programme for young children, Play School, alongside Virginia Stride. In the same year he played the character of Charlie Moffitt in Coronation Street. Between 1966 and 1967 Rollings appeared as a storyteller in ten episodes of the BBC children's television show Jackanory, reading amongst others, stories of Worzel Gummidge. (Rollings would later appear in a 1981 episode of the televised series of Worzel Gummidge). He later narrated The Herbs, and as the character Arkwright with his small dog, Tonto, in the adverts for John Smith's Bitter.

== Filmography ==
Year	Title	Role	Notes
1961	A Weekend with Lulu	Humper	Uncredited
1961	What a Whopper	Constable Doone	
1962	Captain Clegg	Wurzel	
1963	Edgar Wallace Mysteries	Walker	Episode: 'Five to One (film)'
1963	Just for Fun	Party Official with radio	
1964	The Comedy Man	Skippy	
1964	A Hard Day's Night	Man with sandwich in pub	Uncredited
1966	Press for Time	Bus conductor	
1967	Carry On Doctor	Night Porter	
1968	Great Catherine	Glaizer	
1969	The Bed-Sitting Room	Drip feed patient	(as Gordon Rawlings)
1969	Rhubarb	Artist Rhubarb	
1972	Something to Hide	2nd Man at Airport	
1976	The Pink Panther Strikes Again	Inmate	
1977	Jabberwocky	King's taster	(as Gordon Rawlings)
1980	Superman II	Fisherman	
1983	Superman III	Man in cap	(as Gordon Rawlings)
1983	Fanny Hill	Beggar	
1983	The Sign of Four	Mr. Sherman	
1984	Bloodbath at the House of Death	Man at bar	
1984	Give My Regards to Broad Street	Monster	
