= The Adventures of Parsley =

British television series, 1970–1971

- Title card
- Genre: Children's television series
- Created by: Michael Bond
- Written by: Michael Bond
- Directed by: Ivor Wood
- Narrated by: Gordon Rollings
- Country of origin: United Kingdom
- Original language: English
- No. of series: 1
- No. of episodes: 32

Production
- Running time: 5 minutes
- Production company: FilmFair

Original release
- Network: BBC1
- Release: 6 April 1970 – 1 February 1971

Related
- The Herbs

The Adventures of Parsley is a 32-episode children's television series animated in stop motion. Produced by FilmFair, The Adventures of Parsley was a spin-off of The Herbs. Its opening credits featured either Parsley the lion roaring or Dill the dog barking with their head in a circle, in a parody of Leo the Lion. Unlike in The Herbs the animal characters talked, a typical episode featuring a dialogue between the overenthusiastic Dill and the more laid back, deadpan Parsley. Other characters from The Herbs made occasional appearances. As in The Herbs the narration was provided by actor Gordon Rollings.

Like The Herbs, The Adventures of Parsley were created and written by Michael Bond, directed by Ivor Wood, and shown on BBC1 where the latter series was first shown on 6 April 1970. The five-minute episodes concluded the day's broadcast of children's programmes, and preceded the BBC's early evening news broadcast.

== Episodes ==
No.	Title	Original release date
1	"Cowboys and Indians"	6 April 1970
While playing "a nice quiet game of cowboys and Indians", Parsley and Dill are alarmed to see smoke-rings in the sky. Believing that Indians are actually attacking the Herb Garden, they make plans for battle with Constable Knapweed, Mr. Onion and the Chives – only for them all to be embarrassed when Tarragon the Dragon reveals that it was just him.
2	"Aunt Mint's Barbeque Party"	7 April 1970
Parsley and Dill receive a telegram from Aunt Mint, but they have trouble reading what it says and matters are further complicated when Dill eats the telegram by mistake. When they smell cooking, they discover too late that they had been invited to a barbecue.
3	"Toothache"	8 April 1970
After biting his tongue, Parsley bumps into Bayleaf's wheelbarrow. When questioned by Constable Knapweed, he does nothing but groan and howl, leading Knapweed and Bayleaf to conclude that he must have toothache. Their attempt to help him does not end well for Dill's house.
4	"Dill's Who's Who Entry"	10 April 1970
Dill writes a flattering description of himself as an entry for Who's Who. Parsley does not consider the description at all accurate and insists on going through it with him.
5	"Parsley's Invention of a Mechanical Dog"	13 April 1970
Tired of hearing about Dill's obsession with bones, Parsley attempts to invent a mechanical dog which is not obsessed with them.
6	"Holidays at Home"	15 April 1970
Parsley is thinking of going on holiday, but cannot decide where to go or even how to get there. He and Dill invent a set of paper wings to fly there, but neither Parsley nor Tarragon the Dragon have much success with them.
7	"Parsley at a Loose End"	20 April 1970
Feeling at a loose end, Parsley offers services in the agony column of a newspaper – only to receive more jobs than he can handle.
8	"Dill's Restaurant"	21 April 1970
Dill opens a restaurant, but Parsley is not impressed when he finds that most of the food served there is centered on bones. Dill has a steak, but an attempt to cook it – with Constable Knapweed's help – ends in disaster.
9	"Sage's Birthday"	22 April 1970
Parsley wants to get Sage the Owl a balaclava for his birthday. Aunt Mint offers to knit one but Parsley has no end of trouble trying to find out what size Sage takes.
10	"Buried Bones"	24 April 1970
Parsley feels like doing a good deed. He decides to give Dill some bones and digs holes in the Herb Garden looking for some, only for Dill to use one of them to bury his own bones in.
11	"The Conch Shell"	27 April 1970
Dill uses a conch shell to listen to all the sounds of the sea, but when the others try they cannot hear anything.
12	"Putting on a Show"	28 April 1970
Parsley and Dill put on a theatrical show, which gets a very mixed reception.
13	"Works of Art by Dill"	29 April 1970
Hoping to sell some of his paintings, Dill puts on an art exhibition. Parsley is less than impressed and Constable Knapweed is incensed when he discovers that a painting of a shifty looking individual turns out to be a portrait of him.
14	"The Crystal Ball"	1 May 1970
Dill uses a crystal ball to tell people's fortunes. Each fortune ends with Dill being presented with a gift of bones. He eats them all and ends up with stomach ache.
15	"Dill's Day"	4 May 1970
Dill decides to host a special day, charging visitors to look round his kennel. Unfortunately, it's too popular and, as a result of becoming overcrowded, his kennel is destroyed. Parsley offers visits to his den instead.
16	"The Quiz"	20 July 1970
Parsley holds a quiz with Constable Knapweed, Bayleaf and Dill as contestants. Dill gives many silly answers to the questions but still manages to win.
17	"Dill's Television Set"	27 July 1970
Dill gets a television set for his kennel but is reluctant to let anyone else see it.
18	"Eggs and the Golf Ball"	3 August 1970
Parsley mistakes one of Sir Basil's golf balls for an egg, and attempts to get Sage the Owl to hatch it.
19	"On Strike"	10 August 1970
Parsley opens a laundry business and hires Dill to work for him. Dill is not happy with his working conditions and goes on strike.
20	"The Pop Group"	17 August 1970
Auditions for Parsley and Dill's new pop group do not go very well.
21	"Mahatma Dill"	24 August 1970
Parsley wonders why Dill is acting all knowledgeable.
22	"The Art of Self Defence"	31 August 1970
Following a supposed pilfering of Bayleaf's paint tin, Mr. Onion gives a lecture on how the Herbs should defend themselves.
23	"Parsley's Insomnia"	7 September 1970
Parsley cannot sleep and asks around the garden for help.
24	"Parsley's Car"	14 September 1970
Parsley considers buying a car off Dill, who inherited it from an uncle.
25	"Dill Learns French"	21 September 1970
Parsley worries about Dill's sanity when he sees him learning French.
26	"School Prize"	28 September 1970
Parsley and Dill take part in the school exams for a valuable prize.
27	"Dill's One Dog Show"	5 October 1970
Parsley watches Dill rehearse his One Dog Show at the theatre.
28	"Dill's Garage"	12 October 1970
When his car breaks down, Parsley takes it to "Dill's Garage" not anticipating Dill's lack of mechanical know-how. In the end, it turns out the petrol tank was empty.
29	"The Endurance Test"	19 October 1970
Wanting some sleep (disturbed by Bayleaf using his lawnmower, Knapweed blowing his whistle and Sage chirping noisily), Parsley tricks the noisemakers into doing an "endurance test".
30	"Ugh Day"	26 October 1970
When Parsley goes to sleep to try and sleep off an illness described as "Ugh", he has a dream in which he consults other Herbs for help.
31	"Taxi Service"	2 November 1970
Dill mishears Sir Basil and sets up a taxi service by mistake.
32	"Old Memories"	1 February 1971
Parsley and Dill spend time reminiscing about some of the things they have done together.

== Home releases ==
- Roadshow Entertainment (2001)

VHS title	Release date	Episodes
The Adventures of Parsley – Volume 1 (103200)	10 October 2001	Cowboys and Indians, Aunt Mint's Barbeque Party, Toothache, Dill's Who's Who Entry, Parsley's Invention of a Mechanical Dog, Holidays at Home, Parsley at a Loose End, Dill's Restaurant, Sage's Birthday and Buried Bones
The Adventures of Parsley – Volume 2 (103201)	10 October 2001	The Conch Shell, Putting on a Show, Works of Art by Dill, The Crystal Ball, Dill's Day, Dill's Television Set, Eggs and the Golf Ball, The Pop Group, Parsley's Car and Dill's One Dog Show
The Adventures of Parsley – Volume 3 (103202)	10 October 2001	Dill's Garage, The Endurance Test, Parsley's Insomnia, Dill Learns French, Mahatma Dill, The Quiz, School Prize, Ugh Day, On Strike and Taxi Service

== Book adaptation ==
A book compiling the stories of several episodes, The Adventures of Parsley the Lion, was also released.
