= Massive Monster Mayhem =

Canadian game show program

- Genre: Live-action game show; CGI animation
- Created by: Artur Spigel; Michael Chaves
- Directed by: Rae Upton; Wayne Moss
- Presented by: Graham Conway; Devon Deshaun Stewart
- Starring: Thomas Lorber; Ben Van Huis; Aiden Coleman; Kai Ferris; Margaryta Soldotova; Anna Spaershteyn
- Voices of: Daniel Davies; Catarina Ciccone; Graham Conway; Jon Davis; Artur Spigel
- Composer: Lisa Dalbello
- Country of origin: Canada
- Original language: English
- No. of seasons: 1
- No. of episodes: 22

Production
- Executive producers: Artur Spigel; Steven DeNure; Anne Loi; Asaph Fipke; Ken Faier; Josh Scherba
- Cinematography: Devin Armstrong; Ted Hart; Greg Rosen
- Editor: Peter Hordylan
- Camera setup: Multi-camera
- Running time: 30 minutes
- Production companies: 7ATE9 Entertainment; DHX Media; DHX Studios Toronto; Nickelodeon Productions

Original release
- Network: Family Channel
- Release: October 25, 2017 – November 27, 2018

Massive Monster Mayhem is a Canadian game show television program that combines live-action and computer-generated imagery animated elements. It premiered on Family Channel and TeenNick on October 25, 2017. The series was created by Artur Spigel and Michael Chaves. It aired on Nickelodeon and CITV in the UK and Ireland on February 26, 2018.

== Premise ==
Each episode begins with the evil intergalactic overlord Master Mayhem threatening Earth with his plans to destroy it. Three kids compete in a series of challenges for a chance to take on one of Master Mayhem's Master Mayhem while the monsters wreak havoc on Earth. It features live gameplay by kids in futuristic challenges against gigantic Monster Superstars for the chance to win prizes and save the planet from destruction.

When the featured Monster Superstar is unleashed, the announcer will give a description about them like what planet they are from, their side jobs, and their hobbies.

Each episode also features some comical wraparounds involving Master Mayhem at his space condo on another planet.

=== Gameplay ===
The rounds of futuristic challenges are:

- The Megalator – The players must go through a futuristic obstacle course where the two players with the fastest time will go on to the next round. The group that is responsible for building the Megalator has varied per episode.
- The Mega Duel – The remaining two players will compete in a duel where the player with the most points will go on to the final round.
- The Mash Down – The final round takes place in Mega City where the players must fight the Monster Superstar, break the Prize Buildings, and gather Power Pods to throw into the Mega Laser's Mega Reactor so that it can send the Monster Superstar back to Master Mayhem's world. The Mayor of Mega City would often promote one of Mega City's locations which results in her getting injured by the Monster Superstar. Before being enlarged, the player will select a certain battle suit that will give them an advantage in battle before being enlarged to 600 ft. for the Mash Down. The Mega Money Suit will grant the players x2 the prizes. The Mega Ice Suit freezes the monster for five whole seconds if the player says "Freeze!" The Mega Hammer Suit enables the user to knock down the monster and search for power pods if they say "HAMMER!" The Mega Tank Suit will enable the player to find two pods, but will make the player slow. During the fight, there are Boom Buildings in which if they are destroyed, all the prize money will be lost. In addition, the players will obtain a Mayhem Pod which will summon a rival Monster Superstar to fight the featured Monster Superstar for 20 seconds. If the hero manages to beat the featured Monster Superstar, break any prize buildings, and load the Mega Reactor with Power Pods before time runs out, the Monster Superstar will be zapped with the Mega Laser, the Earth will be saved, and the player will be crowned Earth's Champion and win the prize money and also receives a Massive Monster Mayhem Trophy. If the featured Monster Superstar wins, Master Mayhem will spare Earth from destruction in exchange that the player sacrifices themselves in the Chamber of Doom as part of the agreement Master Mayhem made with the Intergalactic Battle Alliance. Either way, the players will go home a hero. The prize money amount ranges from $100, $200, $300, $400, $500, $600, $700, $800, $900 & $1,000.

The Gameplay in the highlight episodes is much different to the regular episodes, The Megalator and The Mega Duel are skipped and replaced by highlight clips from previous episodes. The Mash Down is still present at the end but only two monsters can battle against each other and cannot suit up like the human contestants but they can still be sent to earth as giants. If a monster's opponent wins, the losing monster will be zap by Mega Laser just like their losses in the regular episodes. So far, Only RoBro is the only monster who has the most fights during the monster version of the Mashdown. Macho Cheese and Teensy are the only monsters to fought against RoBro in the highlight episodes.

=== Hosts ===
- Graham Conway (Himself) – The co-host of Massive Monster Mayhem.
- Devon Deshaun Stewart (Himself) – The co-host of Massive Monster Mayhem.
- Announcer (voiced by Artur Spigel) – The announcer is often heard describing each of the Monster Superstars when they are unleashed on Earth and describing Mega City.

=== Characters ===
- Master Mayhem (performed by Thomas Lorber, voiced by Daniel Davies) – An evil intergalactic overlord who is the main antagonist of the series. He comes up with various plans to destroy Earth and abides by the rules of the Intergalactic Battle Alliance. Master Mayhem lives in a space condo on an unidentified planet.
- Carl (performed by Thomas Lorber, voiced by Daniel Davies) - Master Mayhem's successful brother. He was mentioned a lot during the series. So far, he only physical appears in "The Overlord Awards".
- Assistant Kyle - Master Mayhem's unseen assistant and cameraman, who films the overlord's space condo live in most of the episodes.
- Mayor of Mega City (portrayed by Dana Schiemann) – An unnamed woman who is the mayor of Mega City. When attempting to describe a feature of Mega City, she would often get hurt by the featured Monster Superstar.
- The Fat Kid - An overweight young child who appears in some of the episodes during skits.

=== Monster Superstars ===
In each episode, Master Mayhem would send one of his Monster Superstars down to Earth to cause havoc which would result in the players fighting them in the Mashdown. Each of the Monster Superstars have their own Mayhem Level. The Monster Superstars consist of:

- RoBro (performed by Aiden Coleman, voiced by Artur Spigel) – A fitness-themed Buff Bot from the planet Dumbbell who was the result of every super buff robot on the planet melting together into one large Buff Bot following an intense training program. He also has plans to whip any planet his visits into shape. RoBro's Mayhem Level is 8.
- Dome Diddy Dome (performed by Ben Van Hues, voiced by Artur Spigel) – The robotic Vessel of Vengeance from the planet Randome. He was forged in the fiery furnace of a dying sun. Any object placed in Dome Diddy Dome's dome comes to life and controls his body. His Mayhem Level is randomized depending on the object in his dome.
- Teensy the Tri-Terror-Tops (performed by Kai Ferris, voiced by Jon Davis) – A Tri-Terror-Tops from the planet Dinorrhea in the Cretaceous Galaxy. Outside of being the ruler of Dinorrhea, he is also the lovable host of everyone's favorite children's television series "Teensy Time." Teensy's Mayhem Level is 9.
- Macho Cheese (performed by Thomas Lorber and Ben Van Hues, voiced by Artur Spigel) – A lucha libre-themed cheese Appeterrorizer with a large heavy head from the Moons of Planet Moo Moo who had fermented for millions of years at the center of the Milky Way. When Macho Cheese isn't doing any melting to planets, he chases his dream of being a stand-up comic even though he tells bad jokes. His Mayhem Level is 7.
- Major Disappointment (performed by Aiden Coleman, voiced by Graham Conway) – An entitled super celebrity from the planet Cellphie. As the son of the most greatest and feared Monster Superstars of all time where he inherited the strength of his father and the sparkling eyes of his mother, he has not lived up to his potential of conquering the universe where he would often text on his mobile phone and order pizza. His Mayhem Level is 6.
- Me-Ouch! (performed by Anna Spaershteyn, voiced by Catarina Ciccone) – A Laser-Toothed Ti-grrrl from the planet Furball who enjoys destroying planets and ruining people's furniture. Part tiger, Part alien, All fierce. Me-Ouch! is the Purr-fect warrior, the cat's meow, an aspiring pop star, and a quadruple threat which means she is extremely threatening. Her Mayhem Level is 9.
- Eye Eye Eye (performed by Margaryta Soldotova) – A three-eyed idol-like warrior queen from the planet Ohno where she is its fierce fearless defender. One eye sees into the past, one eye sees into the future, and the other eye focuses on kicking her opponent's butts. Eye Eye Eye has the strength to literally move mountains and crush planets like glass ceilings. In addition, Eye Eye Eye has an ancient oath to beat up anyone who annoys her as seen in her description video where she attacks Macho Cheese for making a bad joke about her. Her Mayhem Level is 9.

== Episodes ==
No.	Title	Original release date
1	"Bros & Overthrows"	October 25, 2017
2	"Sneeze the Day"	October 25, 2017
3	"Mommy Fearest"	November 1, 2017
4	"Vacation in Scare-a-Dise"	November 8, 2017
5	"Keeping It Virtual"	November 15, 2017
6	"Hoke-us, Poke-you"	November 22, 2017
7	"Mr. Nice Master"	November 22, 2017
8	"The Overlord Awards"	April 6, 2018
9	"Phoney Business"	April 13, 2018
10	"Camp Poopykaka"	April 20, 2018
11	"Anger Mismanagement"	April 27, 2018
12	"Deja BOOM!"	June 23, 2018
13	"Band of Monsters"	June 16, 2018
14	"Our Creature Presentation"	June 30, 2018
15	"Behind the Screams"	July 7, 2018
16	"That's the Picket"	September 1, 2018
17	"Doom-mate"	September 8, 2018
18	"Birthday Bash"	September 15, 2018
19	"Going Viral"	September 22, 2018
20	"So Long, Suckers!"	September 29, 2018
21	"Let's Get Ready to Slumber"	November 13, 2018
22	"Two Wrongs"	November 27, 2018

== Production ==
Massive Monster Mayhem was created by Artur Spigel and Michael Chaves, with Spigel, Steven DeNure, Anne Loi, Asaph Fipke, Ken Faier, and Josh Scherba acting as the executive producers. The show is filmed against a greenscreen, with Toronto video effects company Playfight providing the real-time CGI environment.

== Home media ==
In 2018, Shout! Factory Kids signed a deal with DHX Media to secure the North American DVD rights to Massive Monster Mayhem.
