= The Twisted Timeline of Sammy & Raj =

British-Indian children's comedy adventure animated series

- Genre: Comedy; Science fiction Action; Adventure
- Created by: Jordan Gershowitz
- Developed by: Jordan Gershowitz
- Directed by: Vikram Veturi
- Voices of: Nirvaan Pal; Aiden Alberto; Crina Shah; Monisha Dadlani; Rama Vallury; Rahnuma Panthaky; Nazia Chaudhry; Nardeep Khurmi; Ratnesh Dubey; Rashmi Rustagi; Ares Totolos; Lily Resto; (See more)
- Music by: Simab Sen
- Composers: Luke Sital-Singh; Simab Sen
- Countries of origin: United Kingdom; India
- Original language: English
- No. of seasons: 1
- No. of episodes: 20

Production
- Executive producers: Chris Rose; Anu Sikka; Tejonidhi Bhandare (Reliance Animation Studios Pvt. Ltd.)
- Editors: N M Badiruddin; Mukesh Nirwal; Laxmikant Khawale
- Running time: 22 minutes (11 minutes per segment)
- Production companies: Reliance Animation; Viacom18; Nickelodeon International

Original release
- Network: Nicktoons (Global); Nickelodeon (UK)
- Release: 9 January – 17 May 2023

The Twisted Timeline of Sammy & Raj is an animated television series created and developed by Jordan Gershowitz. It is produced by Reliance Animation in association with Viacom18 and Nickelodeon International.

== Premise ==
The series follows the reality-bending exploits and adventures of a pair of cousin-brothers, Sammy and Raj, who pause, rewind, fast-forward, and slow-motion their way into a whole host of rowdy laugh-out-loud exploits with a mysterious time-altering app at their fingertips.

== Voice cast ==
=== Main ===
- Nirvaan Pal as Sammy Gupta (Raj, Malini, and Jasime's cousin, Tara's older brother, Kunal and Uma's son, Priyanka and Neil's nephew, Aman and Disha's grandson, and Par Dadi's great grandson.)
- Aiden Alberto as Raj Gupta

=== Supporting ===
- Crina Shah as Tara Gupta
- Rama Vallury as Kunal Gupta
- Rahnuma Panthaky as Uma Gupta
- Nazia Chaudhry as Priyanka Turkel
- Nardeep Khurmi as Neil Gupta
- Monisha Dadlani as Malini Gupta
- Ratnesh Dubey as Dada Aman
- Rashmi Rustagi as Dadi Disha

=== Recurring ===
- Lily Resto as Gabrielle
- Bryant Barnett as Coach Biff and Snake Biter
- Ares Totolos as Hugo Hugeman
- Nazia Chaudhry as Ice Pick

=== Secondary ===
- David Lodge as Dr. Brown
- Will Barber as Mic Drop
- Stephanie Sheh as Kristi Lee and Katherine Yamaguchi
- Nardeep Khurmi as Tavish Kapoor and TV Newscaster
- Lexi Klein as Heidi Hugeman
- Poonam Basu as Jasime and Par Dadi
- Rahnuma Panthaky as Barista

== Episodes ==
No.	Title	Written by	U.K. air date	U.S. air date
1a	"Birthday Do Over"	Jordan Gershowitz	9 January 2023	January 12, 2024 (Sneak Peek); January 15, 2024
Sammy and Raj go back in time to the beginning of Sammy's birthday to throw a party to impress his friends.
1b	"Chore Time"	Story by : Jordan Gershowitz & Jeff Trammell; Teleplay by : Jordan Gershowitz	10 January 2023	January 12, 2024 (Sneak Peek); January 15, 2024
Sammy and Raj are given cleaning chores and plan to use their app to pass the time and play a video game until Sammy's parents come home but everything goes wrong.
2a	"Out of the Loop"	Allan Neuwirth	11 January 2023	January 16, 2024
Sammy and Raj use their time app and skip family movie night to participate in a drone race.
2b	"Dog Gone Problem"	Merrill Hagan	12 January 2023	January 16, 2024
Uma asks Sammy and Raj to take care the dog's bodies in exchange for permission to go see a movie at the cinema that they really wanted to see.
3a	"Sofa So Good"	Nina G. Bargiel	13 January 2023	January 17, 2024
Tara gives Sammy and Raj a double duty to enter the special guest room and sit on the very expensive sofa for Sammy's parents.
3b	"So Much Drama"	Alan Denton & Greg Hahn	16 January 2023	January 17, 2024
Sammy and Raj join the school musical to get views for their channel, and fast forward time to skip all the rehearsals.
4a	"Going Clubbin'"	Jordan Gershowitz	17 January 2023	January 18, 2024
Sammy and Raj go back in time and let Hugo win mini golf so he can invite Raj to his party.
4b	"Totally Board"	Sanjeev Sirpal	18 January 2023	January 18, 2024
The death-defying day of skate is coming to town and Sammy finally has a chance to prove to Hugo that he's not `Silly Sammy', but to be successful he must make sure he is at his very best.
5a	"Invader Dim"	Nina G. Bargiel	19 January 2023	January 22, 2024
Sammy and Raj pull a prank on Tara and convince her that aliens are invading Earth.
5b	"Getting Heat"	Story by : Jordan Gershowitz & Allan Neuwirth; Teleplay by : Alan Denton & Greg Hahn	20 January 2023	January 23, 2024
Sammy and Raj set off to the Polar Palace to buy themselves milkshakes, and get caught up in the fight for the coveted tickets to the cool, luxurious shake complex.
6a	"Bollyweird"	Kelly Lynne D'Angelo	23 January 2023	January 24, 2024
Sammy and Raj try to stop a Bollywood star from releasing a new dance hit that will take the whole world by storm.
6b	"The Spies Who Bugged Me"	Adam Redfern	24 January 2023	January 25, 2024
Sammy and Raj try to catch the masked man who stole the manuscripts of Didi Donnie's novel.
7a	"No Bone to About It"	Joelle Sellner	25 January 2023	January 29, 2024
The mount has become a construction zone. Sammy and Raj need to find a way to fix this.
7b	"Childish Antic"	Mark Hoffmeier	26 January 2023	January 30, 2024
Sammy has his sights set on an action figure but it's expensive. Luckily Mandy has just the job for them.
8a	"Snow Way to Win"	Adam Redfern	27 January 2023	January 31, 2024
It's a snow day and Sammy and Raj are ready to race their sleighs but when they get to the mount, Tara has already set up camp.
8b	"Causing Terrible"	Sanjeev Sirpal	30 January 2023	February 1, 2024
Sammy, Raj and Dada Annie are a musical sensation, but after entering a local talent on show, Raj becomes really nervous.
9a	"Bad for Business"	Amit Bhalla	31 January 2023	February 5, 2024
Sammy are Hugo are running for Junior President Club, but when the votes come in they are tied.
9b	"Anniversorry"	Jordan Gershowitz	1 February 2023	February 5, 2024
Didi and Dada's anniversary party is at the same time as arcade night. The boys must find a way to be in two places at once.
10a	"A Very Rocky Rakhi"	Geetika Lizardi	2 February 2023	February 20, 2024
It's Raksha Bandhan but Sammy can think of nothing worse than spending the day bonding with his sister.
10b	"The Back Up Plan"	Lucas Mills	3 February 2023	February 20, 2024
The boys back up the App for safe keeping. Unfortunately, a tech malfunction causes the app to download to every phone on the house wifi.
11a	"Wake Up Me Before Your Hugo Go"	Alan Denton & Greg Hahn	6 February 2023	February 21, 2024
Sammy and Raj are looking forward to a quiet night, but they are surprised by Hugo's slumber party.
11b	"Hoaxus Pocus"	Joelle Sellner	7 February 2023	February 21, 2024
The boys are shocked to discover that Kyan had a passion for magic when he was young.
12a	"Clean Machine"	Joelle Sellner	8 February 2023	February 22, 2024
On Mother's Day, Sammy has the perfect gift for Uma: a robot that can help the whole family.
12b	"I Scream for Livestream"	Dilpreet Kaur Walia	9 February 2023	February 22, 2024
The boys are set to watch a streamed concert, but Mandy is clearly determined to spoil the fun.
13a	"Diwali Folly"	Amit Bhalla	10 February 2023	February 26, 2024
It's Diwali! The Guptas are super excited, but when Sammy's other cousin Jasmine shows up, Raj suddenly finds himself left out.
13b	"Well Toiled Machine"	Julia Prescott	13 February 2023	February 26, 2024
A Robot Wrestling tournament has hit town. With help from Chichi Neil, Sammy and Raj's Robot will be indestructible, right?
14a	"Scout Is Out"	Story by : Dushant Kirpalani; Teleplay by : Lucas Mills	2 May 2023	February 27, 2024
Sammy and Raj are on their class camping trip and Sammy is determined to win his first merit badge!
14b	"Better Luck Next Time"	Dushant Kirpalani	3 May 2023	February 27, 2024
When Didi Donnie's cousin Ricky sends all the Gupta kids envelopes with lucky rupee coins inside, Sammy is left holding an empty envelope.
15a	"Not So Secret Valentine"	Kelly Lynne D' Angelo	4 May 2023	February 6, 2024
All the Guptas love Valentine's Day, except for Sammy who vows not to get caught up in the holiday. Until...
15b	"Sammy & Raj's Day Off"	Alan Denton & Greg Hahn	5 May 2023	February 6, 2024
Sammy and Raj pretend to be sick to stay home and watch the Domino Championships, but faking it doesn't go to plan...
16a	"Game Overload"	Story by : Sanjeev Sirpal; Teleplay by : Mark Hoffmeier	8 May 2023	February 28, 2024
Sammy, Raj and Gabrielle team up for the Knights of the Galaxy tournament, but winning might be a bit of a challenge.
16b	"Holi Moli"	Geetika Lizardi	9 May 2023	February 29, 2024
It's Holi! The boys can't wait to celebrate but when Mandy decides to go to a teen only party - the boys must find out what it's all about.
17a	"Family Is No Picnic"	Alan Denton & Greg Hahn	10 May 2023	March 4, 2024
It's family game day but while Kyan and Neil keep going head to head, Sammy and Raj promise not to get caught up in the competition.
17b	"The Undefeated Sammy Dynamite"	Alan Denton & Greg Hahn	11 May 2023	March 5, 2024
When Kyan tells the boys to find an after-school club, they make an obvious choice: WRESTLING!
18a	"For a Good Treasure"	Adam Redfern	12 May 2023	March 6, 2024
The boys' class is at the beach, training to be junior life-guards. When suddenly they find a treasure map...
18b	"Clean Breakout"	Geetika Lizardi	15 May 2023	March 7, 2024
The Guptas are having a yard sale! In all the confusion Sammy's phone accidentally ends up in the donation pile!
19a	"Ghoul Just Wanna Have Fun"	Julia Prescott	16 May 2023	March 11, 2024
The boys have planned the perfect Halloween route to all the best candy on the block, until Tara joins them...
19b	"Bitter Taste of Success"	Sandeep Parikh	17 May 2023	March 12, 2024
The Coreyberry Candy company is having a contest to find the next delicious candy! Sammy and Raj have the perfect entry.
20a	"Wedding Daze, Part 1"	Jordan Gershowitz	1 May 2023	March 13, 2024
When the boys accidentally break a family heirloom they must find a way to fix it and put it out of harm's way for good. But how? It has been in the family for decades!
20b	"Wedding Daze, Part 2"	Jordan Gershowitz	1 May 2023	March 14, 2024
The boys must return the family heirloom or else Sammy could disappear forever!

== Broadcast ==
The series was first announced on 4 September 2020 with Jordan Gershowitz serving as head writer. The 20-episode first season was originally slated to premiere in 2021. On 26 and 30 December 2022, the first 10 episodes of the series were broadcast for the first time on Nicktoons Global (included Germany, Serbia, Saudi Arabia and Russia). In the United Kingdom, the series premiered on Nickelodeon on 9 January and ended on 17 May 2023. In Asia, the series premiered on 6 February 2023 on Nickelodeon Asia. In Latin America, the series premiered on Nickelodeon Latin America on 13 March and ended on 26 May 2023. The entire first season premiered on Paramount+ in Australia on 21 August 2023. The first four episodes were made available in the United States on American Airlines flights in 2023. Additionally, select episodes were made available on Virgin Atlantic's inflight entertainment. The series had its premiere on Nickelodeon in India on 16 October 2023. The series had its premiere on Nicktoons in the U.S. on 15 January 2024.

== Reception ==
Chris Rose, VP of international production and development for Paramount's Global Kids & Family Group, said, "The Twisted Timeline of Sammy & Raj is the successful result of our partnership with Viacom18. Thanks to an extensive collaboration and strong teamwork, we managed to create a powerful story that explore differences between Eastern and Western sensibilities.

"The team in India was key to creating the story line and defining the characters for a kids' show which gives audiences a taste of Indian culture, while capturing universal storylines that appeal to all audiences," Rose added.
