= Wiggly Park =

- Country of origin: United Kingdom
- No. of episodes: 26

Production
- Running time: 5 minutes

Original release
- Network: BBC Two
- Release: 9 January 1998 – 11 January 1999

Wiggly Park is a British BBC children's television animated cartoon which was produced in 1997 and shown in 1998. Originally a children's radio programme on BBC Radio 5, the characters were voiced by British actors Andrew Sachs and Kate Sachs.

The original radio show was broadcast as a segment in the weekday morning children's programme '1, 2, 3, 4, 5' presented by 'Ian' on BBC Radio 5.

The show revolved around the adventures of six friends in their home, a large town park. The characters included an earthworm named E.W., a slug named Nifty (who was characterised as being rather slow and a bit dim), a snail called Shelly (who was French and female), Moggy the caterpillar who was very greedy, Buzz the bee, and a tortoise named Thera who was very old.

Repeats of the CBBC series were later repeated on Nick Jr, Tiny Pop and Tiny Living in the early 2000s.

== Episodes ==
Series 1

1. The Birthday Present (9 January 1998)
2. Rodeo Slug (16 January 1998)
3. Tunnel Vision (23 January 1998)
4. Nifty's Balloon Flight (30 January 1998)
5. Me, Argue? (6 February 1998)
6. The Snail Princess (13 February 1998)
7. The Birthday Worm (20 February 1998)
8. Who Am I? (27 February 1998)
9. Je m'appelle Nifty (6 March 1998)
10. Sleep Slithering (13 March 1998)
11. Homesick Snail (17 March 1998)
12. Frog's Legs (24 March 1998)
13. Nifty to the Rescue (31 March 1998)

Series 2

1. That's Stretching It (10 September 1998)
2. The Last Rose (17 September 1998)
3. Moggy Catches A Cold (24 September 1998)
4. The Wiggly Lake Monster (1 October 1998)
5. Shelly Has A Shock (8 October 1998)
6. EW Measures Up (15 October 1998)
7. Turn Over Thera (22 October 1998)
8. A Loose Thread (30 November 1998)
9. Soapy Snack (7 December 1998)
10. Gnome From Ome (14 December 1998)
11. Home Truths (21 December 1998)
12. Missing Slug (4 January 1999)
13. The Art Competition (11 January 1999)
