= The Herbs =

1968 television series for children

- Genre: Children's television
- Created by: Michael Bond
- Written by: Michael Bond
- Directed by: Ivor Wood
- Narrated by: Gordon Rollings
- Theme music composer: Tony Russell
- Country of origin: United Kingdom
- Original language: English
- No. of series: 1
- No. of episodes: 13

Production
- Executive producer: Graham Clutterbuck
- Producer: Ivor Wood
- Running time: 15 minutes
- Production company: FilmFair

Original release
- Network: BBC1
- Release: 12 February – 6 May 1968

Related
- The Adventures of Parsley (1970)

The Herbs is a television series for young children made for the BBC by Graham Clutterbuck's FilmFair company. It was written by Michael Bond (creator of Paddington Bear), directed by Ivor Wood using 3D stop motion model animation and first transmitted from 12 February 1968 in the BBC1 Watch with Mother timeslot. There were 13 episodes in the series, each one 15 minutes long.

A spin-off series entitled The Adventures of Parsley was transmitted from 6 April 1970 in the five-minute period between the end of children's TV and the BBC Evening News. This had 32 episodes, some of which were released on VHS as Parsley the Lion and Friends.

The Herbs consisted of a fantasy mix of human and animal characters inhabiting the magical walled garden of an English country estate. At the beginning of each episode, the narrator (Gordon Rollings) spoke the magic word, "Herbidacious", which caused the garden gate to open.

As with The Magic Roundabout, the sophisticated writing style and narrative delivery of The Herbs meant that the appeal was somewhat broader than was originally intended, and much of Parsley's droll humour undoubtedly went over the heads of the age group that was its main target. Consequently, it still retains a following among those who watched it when it was first broadcast.

== Characters ==
Each character was the personification of a herb. It is said that Bond used quotes from Nicholas Culpeper's 17th-century book, Culpeper's Complete Herbal, to find herbs whose botanical traits he could best reflect in the individual characters. As each character appeared in the show, they were introduced by a little signature song, which varied slightly from one episode to the next.

The major character was Parsley the Lion. In the original series Parsley did not actually speak (although he did have his own signature tune: "I'm a very friendly lion called Parsley...") but his thoughts were voiced by the narrator. Rollings' dead-pan style became a feature of the programme, and was similar to that used by Eric Thompson in his characterisation of Dougal the dog in the English version of The Magic Roundabout.

=== Cast list ===
Regulars (appearing in almost all episodes)

- Parsley the Lion – The shy but friendly main character, who always sat on the path in front of the herb garden to welcome the viewers. He was very frightened of strangers until he got to know them. He was one of only two Herbs who seemed aware of the viewers, waiting at the gate for them and waving. He hated getting his tail wet. Though in the original series he did not speak (except to sing his signature song), in The Adventures of Parsley he conversed with Dill.
- Dill the Dog – A hyperactive dog who was always getting into scrapes which (in The Adventures of Parsley) provided Parsley with a rich source for his laconic comments. He was constantly chasing his tail and was a source of great annoyance to Constable Knapweed.
- Sage the Owl – A plump, bad-tempered owl, the third member of the central "animal trio". (The other characters – with the one exception of Tarragon – were human, or at least anthropomorphic.) Sage frequently fell out of his nest and hated getting his feathers wet. Like Parsley and Dill, Sage never spoke except to sing his signature song, which he sang in a rapid testy voice somewhat reminiscent of Patrick Moore.
- Sir Basil – A bumbling aristocrat with an enormous red nose. He described himself the "King of The Herbs" (the Greek name for basil being βασιλικόν φυτόν, or "royal plant"). Despite this he actually had little authority and was largely under the thumb of his wife. He wore a deerstalker and a monocle that sometimes fell out. Despite his fondness for hunting and fishing, he was not particularly good at either.
- Lady Rosemary – Sir Basil's prim and proper wife. She kept her husband under check, particularly when he had his shotgun to hand.
- Constable Knapweed – A policeman who was constantly writing Herbs' names and nonsensical crimes in his notebook. Quite what purpose this served was never explained; Knapweed did not seem to have any superiors, or indeed anyone to report his investigations to.
- Bayleaf the Gardener – Always hard at work in Sir Basil and Lady Rosemary's garden, Bayleaf was often frustrated by problems started by or involving Parsley. He spoke with a West Country accent.

Semi-regulars (appearing in some episodes):

- Aunt Mint – An old Auntie-like woman who was nearly always seen sitting in a rocking chair and knitting.
- Mr Onion – Father and schoolmaster of the Chives. He dressed as a stereotypical schoolmaster in a grey suit, bow tie and a mortar board. He always addressed the Chives in the manner of a drill sergeant. Unlike other characters in the series who were humans or animals with some plantlike features, Mr. Onion and his family had traits of neither and were fully anthropomorphic onions.
- Mrs Onion – The wife of Mr. Onion and mother of the Chives. She wore a red and white checkered headscarf and was always crying, even when happy.
- The Chives – The Onions' ten children, the pupils in Mr. Onion's school. They were always referred to collectively as "The Chives" and never given individual names. It was not even specified whether any of them were male / female.
- Tarragon the Dragon – A small, friendly fire-breathing dragon. He was very clumsy, perhaps because everything he breathed fire at disappeared. (Luckily he only ever destroyed inanimate objects such as Constable Knapweed's notebook.) Like the other animals he only ever spoke in his signature song, which he sang with a lisp. He hatched from an egg that fell from the top of a tarragon plant in the sky.

Minor / one-off characters (appearing in only a few episodes):

- Pashana Bedhi – An Indian snake-charmer, who lay on a bed of nails and played a pungi. He was very respectful and always addressed Parsley as "Mr. Parsley".
- Good King Henry – A minor character, who only appears briefly in the series. He was grown from a seed by Bayleaf in order to create a husband for Miss Jessop (having been ordered by Lady Rosemary to marry her himself otherwise).
- Miss Jessop – A very fussy middle-aged woman. She married Good King Henry.
- Belladonna the Witch – The evil Belladonna was a one-off character. She turned several of the Herbs into weeds, but was finally thwarted by Dill, as this herb was used to ward off witches in real life. She left behind her broom, which Dill used to restore the transfigured Herbs to their original state, and which Parsley sometimes used in later episodes.
- Signor Solidago – Signor Solidago is an opera singer from Italy who attempted to teach Sage (and very briefly, Parsley) to sing. He failed miserably on both counts, eventually storming out of his own classroom.

== Comics ==
A comic strip based on the series was drawn by Bill Mevin and published in Pippin comic.

== Episodes ==
There were 13 episodes of The Herbs and 32 of The Adventures of Parsley. The entire collection is available on DVD in a two-disc set.

No.	Title	Original release date
1	"Parsley's Tail"	12 February 1968
Parsley's tail is blown off by Sir Basil's gun and during this time, everyone is trying to help Parsley by finding him a new tail. Eventually, it is found when Sage the owl is blown out of his tree and it is all over his eyes.
2	"Sage's Nest Blows Down"	19 February 1968
Sage is still out of his tree which leads to trouble with Constable Knapweed. It is up to Pashana Bedhi to save the day for Sage.
3	"Belladonna the Witch"	26 February 1968
An evil witch named Belladonna comes to the herb garden, and turns some of the Herbs into weeds with a magic potion. As more Herbs fall victim to her power, the only hope is for the transformed Parsley to wake up a sleeping Dill.
4	"Tarragon and the Eggs"	4 March 1968
After Bayleaf accidentally creates a giant plant in the garden, Parsley is sent climbing to the top, and returns with a giant egg that a reluctant Sage has to help hatch.
5	"The Chives Catch Colds"	11 March 1968
The Chives, belonging to Mr. Onion and his wife, catch a cold during a lesson, prompting Parsley to search for a cure for them.
6	"Pashana Bedhi the Snake Charmer"	18 March 1968
Pashana Bedhi's snake escapes from his basket, and everyone confuses him with Bayleaf's garden hose.
7	"Miss Jessop Tidies Up"	25 March 1968
Miss Jessop's constant tidying is upsetting everybody and they soon decide that she needs a husband. But Bayleaf is not happy when he hears who the first choice is.
8	"Parsley and the Circus Lion"	1 April 1968
Another lion roams around the Herb Garden, which leads to everyone mistaking Parsley for the rogue party, followed by Parsley deciding to imitate the lion's example.
9	"Sage's Singing Lesson"	8 April 1968
Sage wants to learn to sing, and attends lessons with Signor Solidago. But he fails miserably.
10	"Strawberry Picking"	15 April 1968
Sir Basil, Lady Rosemary, and Bayleaf are busy with the annual strawberry picking, but when they finish for the day, they find all the fruit has disappeared.
11	"Sir Basil's Fishing Expedition"	22 April 1968
Sir Basil's Fishing Expedition is ruined in the end.
12	"The Show"	29 April 1968
The other herbs put on a show for Sir Basil and Lady Rosemary, but chaos ensues.
13	"Parsley's Birthday Party"	6 May 1968
All the Herbs, except Belladonna the Witch, come together to secretly celebrate a special day, but Parsley is not allowed to know about it for some reason.

== Home releases ==
In 1989, Tempo Video released three videos of The Herbs, each with four episodes and omitting "Strawberry Picking".

Title	Release date	Episodes
The Herbs: 4 Timeless Stories (V9233)	April 1989	"Parsley's Tail"; "Sage's Nest Blows Down"; "Pashana Bedhi (The Snake Charmer)"; "Sage's Singing Lesson"
The Herbs: 4 Stories from the Classic T.V. series (V9234)	April 1989	"Parsley's Birthday Party"; "The Chives Catch Colds"; "Sir Basil's Fishing Expedition"; "Parsley and the Circus Lion
The Herbs: 4 Herbadacious Stories (92352)	November 1989	"Belladonna the Witch"; "Tarragon and the Egg"; "The Show"; "Miss Jessop Tidies Up"

In October 1989, the Strawberry Picking episode of The Herbs appeared on the BBC video release of "Watch with Mother the Next Generation" (BBCV 4280) along with Tales of the Riverbank, Pogles' Wood, Mary, Mungo and Midge and Barnaby the Bear.

On 14 June 1993, Castle Communications Plc released three videos of The Herbs with episodes on each one in a slightly different combination than the earlier Tempo tapes, including Strawberry Picking, but omitting Parsley's Birthday Party.

Title	Cat. No. (Castle Vision)	Cat. No. (Playbox)	Episodes
The Herbs: 4 Exciting Episodes (Parsley's Tail)	CVS 4043	PVC 148	"Parsley's Tail"; "Sage's Nest Blows Down"; "Belladonna the Witch"; "Tarragon and the Eggs"
The Herbs: 4 Exciting Episodes (The Chives Catch Colds)	CVS 4044	PVC 149	"The Chives Catch Colds"; "Pashana Bedhi 'The Snake Charmer'"; "Miss Jessop Tidies Up"; "Parsley and the Circus Lion
The Herbs: 4 Exciting Episodes (Sage's Singing Lesson)	CVS 4045	PVC 150	"Sage's Singing Lesson"; "Strawberry Picking"; "Sir Basil's Fishing Expedition"; "The Show"

In 2008 Abbey Kids released a DVD set containing all 13 episodes of the Herbs along with the 32 episodes of The Adventures of Parsley.
