= Mouse and Mole =

- Genre: Animation
- Created by: Joyce Dunbar (Books)
- Directed by: Joy Whitby
- Voices of: Richard Briers (Mouse, Rat, Rabbit, Walrus, Snowmouse); Alan Bennett (Mole, Hedgehog, Miss Hare, Snowmole); Imelda Staunton (Shrew and her babies, Frog, Wishfish)
- Composer: John Baird
- Country of origin: United Kingdom
- Original language: English
- No. of series: 1
- No. of episodes: 19 (1 Special)

Production
- Producers: Ben Baird; Clive Juster
- Running time: 10 minutes
- Production company: Grasshopper studios

Original release
- Network: CBBC; Cbeebies

Mouse and Mole is a 1996 British television series devised by Joy Whitby's Grasshopper Productions. It is based on the series of children's books written by Joyce Dunbar and illustrated by James Mayhew which were first published in 1993 by Transworld, and later by Graffeg Ltd. It was originally envisaged as 26 five-minute episodes, but only 19 were ever finished, although the soundtracks for the remaining seven episodes, created by Ben Baird at Aquarium Studios, are still in existence.

The series focuses on the mishap adventures and everyday life of two lifelong old friends who share the same house with a garden and orchard, Mouse and Mole. Mouse is considered wise, longsuffering, encouraging, and kind-hearted, whereas Mole can be simple-minded, childish and oftentimes selfish. The characters of Mouse and Mole were played by Richard Briers and Alan Bennett respectively. The character of Mole was originally to be played by Stephen Fry, but shortly before the recording session, Fry became unavailable, and Alan Bennett stepped in on the proviso that he would step aside should Fry become available.

Some would say Mouse and Mole are a knockoff of Rat and Mole from the 1908 Kenneth Grahame novel The Wind in the Willows, since Rat is a water vole and has an appearance similar to that of Mouse. Ironically, Alan Bennett played Mole in the 1995 adaptation of The Wind in the Willows, while Richard Briers who did Mouse played Rat in the Martin Gates adaptation that came out the same year, both a year before Mouse and Mole aired, and at the same time as the former's sequel, The Willows in Winter. However, the first book is dedicated by the author, Joyce Dunbar, to “Dear old Frog and Toad”, a reference to the book series by Arnold Lobel, which is clearly the model for the Mouse and Mole books.

It has often been suggested that Mouse and Mole, like Frog and Toad, are gay characters. Author Joyce Dunbar initially dismissed this, but later, when Graffeg relaunched the book series, she said, “Maybe they are… I don’t know!”. The original illustrator, James Mayhew, like Lobel, does identify as gay, and has said he always felt the characters were gay, and that illustrating the books was like a “visual autobiography” for him, as so many details are based on his own life and home.

In 2013 Grasshopper Productions in partnership with Baird TV and Clive Juster and Associates, created a 28-minute Christmas Special entitled "Mouse and Mole at Christmas Time". Richard Briers and Alan Bennett reprised their roles of Mouse and Mole, as well as the minor characters, but were also joined by Imelda Staunton for this one-off 'special' as Shrew and her babies. It was aired in December 2013 on Cbeebies.

== Books ==
Title	Summary	Release Date
Mouse and Mole		
Mouse and Mole Have a Party		
A Very Special Mouse and Mole		
Happy Days for Mouse and Mole		
Hip-Dip-Dip with Mouse and Mole		
The Ups and Downs of Mouse and Mole		
Mouse and Mole, A Fresh Start		
Mouse and Mole, The Secret of Happiness		
Lo and Behold! Mouse and Mole		

== Episodes ==
#	Title	Summary	Air Date
1	Hip-Dip-Dip	Mole found a toy boat in the shop window that he always wanted, but he didn't have the money to buy it, so Mouse decided to buy it for him, even though it wasn't Mole's birthday. But when they went to buy it, poor Mole couldn't choose which colour boat he liked best. After having a bad dream, Mole still couldn't decide which boat he liked best. Heading back to the shop, Mole was distraught to discover that the toy boat he had seen in the window was already sold, and when he confessed that it was the boat he wanted, Mouse revealed himself to be the buyer. Mole decided to share it with him.	
2	The Hammock	Mouse finds netting in the greenhouse and decides to build a hammock with it. It attracts Mole when he saw what Mouse was up to and makes excuses to try the hammock first. When Mouse asks him how it is, Mole then began abusing his friend's concerns over the hammock by asking him for some cushions, a jar of biscuits, and a glass of lemonade, finally ending with Mole asking Mouse to leave him alone with the lemonade and biscuits. Karma then struck Mole when the hammock breaks with all the weight, giving him a nasty bump on the head. Mouse repaired and strengthened the hammock, and while Mole rested on the cushions, Mouse told him to not bother with the biscuits or lemonade, as he was happy with just the hammock.	
3	Spectacles	Mouse tries to find Mole his spectacles one day, but whenever he thinks he finds them, he ends up finding those that are not the right pair. It is revealed that Mole has a lot of glasses so he can see different things, but it is with all these abilities that he finally finds his right pair to find the other glasses, which were seated on top of his head.	
4	Catch a Falling Leaf	Mouse and Mole go into the forest hoping to catch a falling leaf so to give them good luck. When poor Mole fell into a bramble bush while Mouse was sitting down, a leaf fluttered onto Mouse's lap. Feeling sorry for Mole, Mouse lets his leaf go when Mole found a leaf within the bramble bush to cheer him up after being covered with cuts and bruises. Mole then told Mouse, while mending his trousers, that next autumn he would find him a leaf.	
5	Half a Banana	Mole decided to stay in while Mouse went on his walk. Secretly, he was looking for the half-eaten banana he'd left somewhere in the house from yesterday. Unable to find it, he decided to get it right by leaving his half-eaten food all around the house, so as to save it for after he'd had his nap. when Mouse came back, he found the half-eaten food and ate them, thinking how careless it was for Mole to leave them scattered around the house. As soon as Mouse went to have his nap, however, Mole woke up, only to find all of his half-eaten food had gone. Demanding of Mouse who had eaten them, Mouse told Mole that he was the one who ate them because he'd thought it would have been a waste, but when Mole told him that they were his, Mouse apologised by telling him that the half of his food may still be around in the house and that Mole could have them instead. Mole doubted by saying that Mouse had already eaten them, until Mouse took up a pillow, and found the half-eaten banana from yesterday that Mole had been searching for. Ripe and a day old, Mouse gave it to Mole, who, when offering, Mouse told him that he could have it all to himself, which Mole did, even though the banana was now very squishy.	
6	A Frisky Fluttery Ghost	Mouse made some crispy buttery toast that he was going to have for breakfast in the garden with Mole, but when Mole was called to wake up, he misunderstood Mouse and mistook the white sheets he hung up to dry as a Frisky Fluttery Ghost, scaring him, but also Mouse when coming in to wake him up, while at the same time all the toast was eaten by a sparrow. Plucking up courage, Mouse and Mole tried to be fierce to scare away any ghosts, but when they saw that there weren't any ghosts, they made more toast and had them in the garden as lunch. It then began to rain and was getting the white sheets wet, but Mole says that the rain is making the ghosts wet, with both putting on white sheets on their heads and pretending to be ghosts in the rain.	
7	A Fresh Start	Mole says that he and Mouse see each other way too much, and suggests that for one day, they should pretend like they've never met. It didn't help that on that very morning, Hedgehog would send his invitation for elevenses at his place. Mouse discovered the invitation, but remembering what Mole said, decided not to tell him and went to Hedgehog by himself. Later, Mole woke up without being woken up by Mouse and noticed that he hadn't made Mole any breakfast. He then remembered what he had said to Mouse yesterday, but it led him to think that Mouse had forgotten. He became first annoyed when searching for him, not wanting to speak to him, and then anxious when thinking he had left him for a better friend. Taking the motorbike, he found Mouse with Hedgehog and was very upset with Mouse for not being there for him. Later, calling the whole "fresh start" thing off, Mouse made Mole sausage and eggs, both very happy being together again, with Mouse giving Mole a piece of honey flapjacks from Hedgehog's elevenses.	
8	Preposterous Puddle	Mouse finds a stick he calls Humphrey, while Mole finds a puddle, which to Mouse he found it preposterous for Mole to keep and have it around. Unaware, Mole thought the word preposterous was what Mouse recommended as a name. Regardless, he decided to help Mole by putting the puddle in a jar. Only when meeting Rat and him saying how preposterous it was for Mole to keep a puddle did Mole accuse Mouse of making a fool out of him, and to be as heartless, he poured the puddle out and threw the jar down. Later, Mole was given Humphrey by Mouse to cheer Mole up, and also because he had found a better stick, which he calls Ambrose. Mouse and Mole then decided to play sword fights with their sticks.	
9	Pebbles	As Mouse and Mole were throwing pebbles in the lake, Mouse began thinking deep thoughts about how many pebbles there are, and all the pebbles that have been, and all the pebbles that will be, too many pebbles to count, which then reflects to mice, and then to moles, and to how because there are so many of them, how can one be important, and that do they mean anything to the world, which then led them to feel upset. That was until they each found a unique-looking pebble and gave it to each other, which made them understand what something special really is.	
10	The Picnic	Mouse and Mole decided to go out for a picnic, but Mole wasn't so sure about the weather, so went back to be prepared for the day, first a rain coat in case it rains, then winter cloths in case it snows, and finally pyjamas in case it gets dark. Meanwhile, Mouse had been eating the picnic while he waited for Mole. By the time Mole returned and found out what had happened to the food, Mole suspected the emergency and had decided to bring cake with him for the picnic. Annoyed with Mole, and had already cancelled his picnic, Mouse decided to go for a long walk instead.	
11	Whiskers	Dissatisfied with his lop-sided whisker being longer than the other, Mole got out the scissors and tried to correct it, only to then accidentally cut all his whiskers off. His wailing caught the attention of Hedgehog, Rabbit, and Rat, who came to see what had happened. When Mouse and Mole explained, the three cheered him up on how better it is not to have whiskers for how much trouble they can give you. That impressed Mole and suggested that he could cut theirs off, which caused the three to flee for their lives. Mouse then laughed and told Mole that whiskers can grow back.	
12	Atishoo!	Mouse catches a cold, so Mole decides to mollycoddle him by making him breakfast, giving him the first read of the newest comic book, and running him a hot bath. Starting with running the bath, Mole then made Mouse his breakfast with Mole's favourite things: a boiled egg with buttered toast soldiers, a jar of marmalade and peppermint tea. Mole was then heading up the stairs with the breakfast when he thought that the breakfast he had made might not be right for Mouse and decided to sample it just to be sure, only to eat the entire thing, including the marmalade out of the jar with a spoon. He then decided to check the comic to see if it's right for Mouse, only to enjoy it a lot. He then remembered the bath and ran up to turn the tap off, before getting in to see if it is right for Mouse. He was relaxing in it while reading the comic, only for the comic to get wet, and him staying in the bath for too long made it freezing cold. Mole gave the wet comic to Mouse after telling him what happened to it, his bath, and his breakfast, but now was asking the sick Mouse to mollycoddle him now that he has caught a cold.	
13	Talk to Me	Mole is very quiet and says little to Mouse, so Mouse decided to ask him of what they shall do the next day, like if the weather is good, then they can go on a picnic, if not, then they should spends the next day toasting fresh muffins and chestnuts beside an Applewood fire in the parlour. The latter is what they ended up doing, with Mole eating so many muffins and chestnuts that he asked for a salad to cure his aching tummy.	
14	Tidying Up	After eating too much from the previous episode, Mole wanted to do exercises in the sitting room, only to find the room all cluttered up, so they moved the clutter into the kitchen, only for the room to become too dusty for Mole to do his deep breathing, so they decided to dust it up and make the sitting room clean. By then, Mole was too tired to do any exercises and decided to sit down and have a cup of tea in the kitchen, only to find the kitchen all cluttered up, so they moved the clutter into the bedroom. Mouse and Mole then had a cup of tea and had piles of pancakes with treacle for tea. Heading for an early night, Mouse and Mole found their bedroom all cluttered up, but feeling too tired to tidy up, they just clambered into bed.	
15	Stuff	Following on from the previous episode, Mouse realised that he and Mole hadn't been tidying up the clutter properly as they had been moving them from room to room. This time, they were to properly tidy by taking their unneeded stuff over to the dump with the motorbike, but while there, Mole, being a hoarder, began collecting stuff he thought might be useful one day, and decided to bring more unneeded stuff back home. Mole loved playing with a couch spring on his nose, while Mouse sulked in irritation with their house overcrowded with stuff.	
16	Least Expecting	Mouse and Mole try not to expect exciting things so that they might happen. Mouse starts by expecting an apple pie tree and decided to make custard while they waited, with nothing happening. Mole then tried with there being a package and decided to do the garden, have a cup of tea and play table tennis while they waited, with nothing happening. Later, there was a knock on the door, and there were their friends, wishing Mole a happy birthday with a large apple pie to go with the custard.	
17	Daffodil	Mole admired a daffodil in their garden, and was tempted to pick it, but Mouse suggested it is better where it is. But when Mole had the urge to pick it, he felt so guilty for what he did that he didn't want to look at it. Mole then tried to tape it back onto the stem one night, only for Mouse to find it dead in the morning. But before he could tell Mole, Mole found another daffodil close to the window. Thinking that it was the same one, Mouse decided not to tell him it wasn't and instead watched it bloom from their house window.	
18	A Sad Moment	Mole is cold and miserable in the winter, and also sad when his happiest moment in life is over. Mouse tries to cheer him up by recollecting the things they did across the four seasons, how Mouse and Mole found the Daffodil in the spring, how Mouse made The Hammock in the summer, how they Catch the Falling Leaves in autumn, and how they are now sitting by the fire enjoying their pea soup in winter.	
19	The Secret of Happiness	Mole dreams about the secret to happiness, but is upset when he forgets it when he wakes up. His friends then tried to help which eventually lead Mole to finally discover what the secret of happiness is. Though it is not mentioned as to what it is, it is clear from the episode that it is something to do with friendship.	
SP	Mouse and Mole at Christmas Time	It was Christmas Day, and Mouse and Mole are preparing a twelve night party for their friends Rabbit, Hedgehog, Frog and Rat, but when a squatting Shrew and her babies came rummaging into their house, the annoyed Mole unwilling to share with Shrew was forced to sleep out in the snow where he dreams the snowmole Mouse made him came to life and took him to snowmole's country, where he wished from the Wishfish for the touch to turn things into icing, which only backfired when his wished friends were turned into icing too. Little did he know was that he was sleepwalking towards the pond, only for Mouse, Shrew and her babies to come and save him. twelve days later, and with Mole recovering from a cold he'd caught, he and Mouse attended the party with all their friends, and all of them singing On the Twelfth Day of Christmas. After the party was over, Mole showed Mouse that he had made a snowmouse to go with the snowmole, mirroring their friendship.	
