= Lizzie's Library =

- Genre: Children's television series
- Created by: Kate Henderson
- Written by: Kate Henderson
- Directed by: Tim Adlide
- Narrated by: Noni Hazlehurst
- Opening theme: Brian White/Craig Hanicek / K Henderson
- Ending theme: Brian White/Craig Hanicek /K Henderson
- Composer: Brian White/Craig Hanicek
- Country of origin: Australia
- Original language: English
- No. of seasons: 1
- No. of episodes: 26

Production
- Executive producer: Phillip Bowman
- Producer: Phillip Bowman
- Running time: 5 minutes
- Production company: Henderson Bowman Productions

Original release
- Network: ABC TV
- Release: 6 November – 8 December 1995

Lizzie's Library is an Australian children's television series which aired on ABC TV from 6 November 1995 to 8 December 1995. It was repeated until 31 January 2003.

The show tells the story of Lizzie, a young librarian who owns and drives a mobile library van, and her relationship with the townspeople of a fictional Australian town of Long Flat. One of the residents is an Aboriginal man, Munro, who teaches her about his cultural background.

== Episode list ==
(partial)

1. "Booksy and the Bushfire Brigade"
2. "The Wrong End of the Stick"
3. "Babies Need Books"
4. "The Show Must Go On"
5. "Lions and Lanterns and Long-Tailed Kites"
6. "Stanley Shoesmith's Funny Nose"
7. "What's in a Name?"
8. "When Penny Got the Blues"
9. "Have Yourself an Aussie Little Christmas"
10. "Possums Don't Wear Boots"
11. "Why Did the Chicken-Pox Cross the Road?"
12. "Munro the Navigator"
13. "Bluey's Brother Red"
14. "Lizzie Drops a Hint"
15. "Todd's Ark"
16. "Greening Long Flat and Greening Bluesy Too"
17. "The Easter Soup Hunt"
18. "A Helping Hand"
19. "Day Lizzie Was Late"
20. "Paper Chase"
21. "Brotherly Love"
22. "Amnestry"
23. "(Not Very) Strictly Murri Ballroom"
24. "M G Fan Club"
25. "Jacaranda Festival"
26. "Kangaroos Have More Than One Tale"
