= Bunny slippers =

Novelty footwear

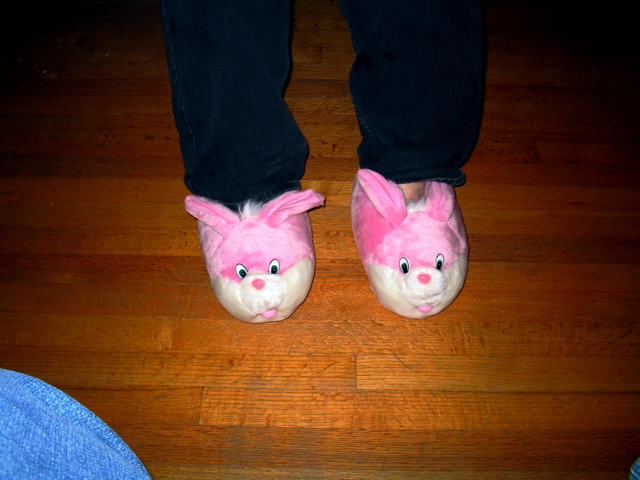
A person wearing pink bunny slippers

Bunny slippers are a type of slipper in the shape of a cartoon rabbit, intended for indoor use and worn by both children and adults. Sold to consumers as a novelty clothing item, something to be paired with sleepwear, or even in shoe form, bunny slippers appear regularly in popular culture. Their exact origin is unknown, although they can be traced back at least as far as 1916. Bunny slippers are used as a visual symbol and trope in popular culture.

== History ==
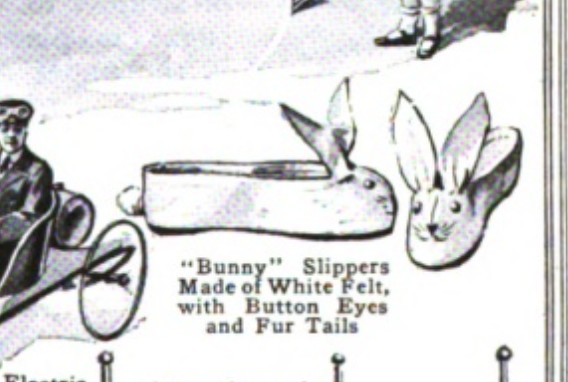
"Bunny" slippers on The Children's Page of New Ideas in Popular Mechanics Magazine (July 1916)

In the July 1916 edition of American magazine Popular Mechanics, an illustration of bunny slippers appears on The Children's Page of New Ideas with the short description: "'Bunny' Slippers Made of White Felt, with Button Eyes and Fur Tails".

Early versions were often handmade using materials like wool or satin and decorated with beaded eyes, embroidered whiskers, or yarn tails.

An early description printed in a December 7th 1918 edition of Boot and Shoe Recorder noted that they were "a novelty of recent origination". The Maine Historical Society description for a pair of handmade bunny slippers circa 1924 states: "By the early 20th century, the bunny slipper, a childhood staple, appeared in illustrations and advertisements".

== Cultural significance and popular culture ==
Bunny slippers are referenced in popular culture as a recurring symbol of leisure, comedy, or childlike innocence, having appeared in various films, television shows, video games, cartoons, comics, stage productions, and more.

=== Famous bunny slippers ===
Two examples of famous bunny slippers that have museum-status are the crocheted blue bunny slippers actor Harvey Fierstein wore onstage as Arnold Beckoff in the Broadway play Torch Song Trilogy (1982) and the slippers worn by actor Addy Miller as Summer, the first "walker" to appear in the The Walking Dead, (Season 1 Episode One: Days Gone Bye) (2010) which are both housed at the Smithsonian's National Museum of American History.

=== Examples in popular culture ===
==== Cartoons, comics and animation ====
- Garfield Comic (April 12, 1984) - Garfield the cat struggles to take owner Jon seriously because of his bunny slippers
- Garfield Comic (August 10, 1992) - Jon sings a song about his "Fuzzy bunny slippers!...Cute bunny slippers!... Comfy bunny slippers!" much to Garfield's chagrin
- Adult Animated Series Futurama Season 7 Episode 5: The Duh-Vinci Code (1999) - Leela is spotted wearing Matt Groening style bunny slippers
- Adult Animated Series Happy Tree Friends (1999–present) - Cuddles, a rabbit himself, is typically seen wearing a pair of pink bunny slippers
- Adult Animated Series The Simpsons Season 13 Episode 13: The Old Man and the Key (2002) - Paired with her housecoat Marge wears Matt Groening style bunny slippers (Homer is wearing his own novelty slippers paired with his housecoat)
- Stop-Motion Animated Children's Television Series Postman Pat Season 4 Episode 7: Postman Pat and the Pink Slippers (2006) - Postman Pat borrows a pair of pink fluffy bunny slippers after his shoes and socks get wet when he steps in a puddle
- Animated Comedy Film Over the Hedge (2006) - HOA president and animal hater, Gladys, wears bunny slippers with her silk pajamas throughout the film
- Animated Television series The Garfield Show Season 2 Episode 3: Night of the Living Bunny Slippers (2011) - A pair of bunny slippers are transformed into giant, evil bunny slippers on the night of the blue moon.
- Animated children's television series Maggie and the Ferocious Beast Season 3 Episode 13: Bunny Slippers (2016) - the titular Beast wants a pair of bunny slippers after seeing all his friends have a pair.
- Animated Film The Loud House Movie (2021) - After discovering his royal heritage as a Duke, Lincoln Loud is seen wearing a crown and bunny slippers.
- Animated Film Turning Red (2022) - 13-Year old Mei squishes the bunny slippers next to her bed after transforming into a giant red panda

==== Live action television ====
- Blue's Clues Season 3 Episode 6: Blue's Big Pajama Party (1999) - Julia Louis-Dreyfus guest stars as a slipper repair woman who is tasked with fixing Steve's bunny slippers
- Summer (played by Addy Miller), the first "walker" to appear in the Walking Dead TV series, wore bunny slippers, which are housed at the Smithsonian's National Museum of American History.

==== Live action film ====
- A Christmas Story (1983) - Ralphie wears pink bunny slippers that match his pink bunny suit gifted to him by his aunt.
- Robin Hood: Men in Tights (1993), Prince John is depicted wearing pink bunny slippers during a bath scene.

==== Stage ====
- Actor Harvey Fierstein wore crocheted blue bunny slippers onstage as Arnold Beckoff in the Broadway play Torch Song Trilogy (1982), which are housed at the Smithsonian's National Museum of American History

==== Other ====
- Blockbuster exclusive Scooby Doo plush toy of Scooby is wearing pajamas, a nightcap and bunny sippers (2001)
- In 2020, actress Sophie Turner was photographed wearing pink bunny slippers during a socially-distanced walk.

== Gallery ==
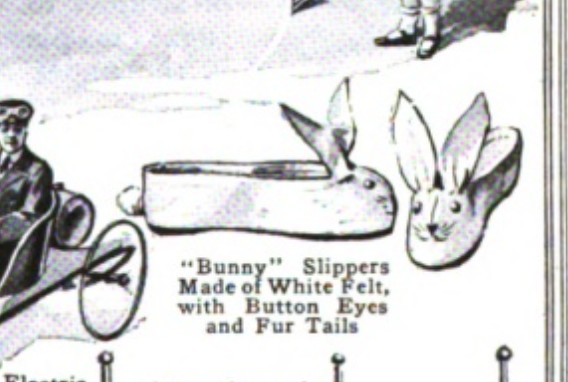
"Bunny" Slippers on The Children's Page of New Ideas in Popular Mechanics Magazine (July 1916)

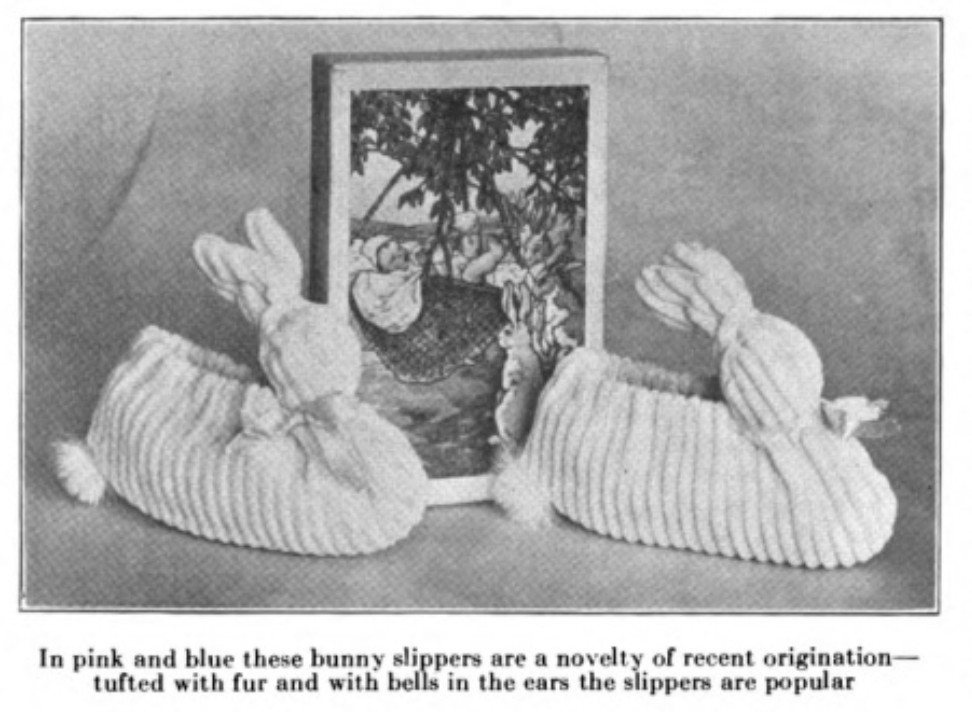
Pink & blue bunny slippers in Boot and Shoe Recorder (December 7, 1918)

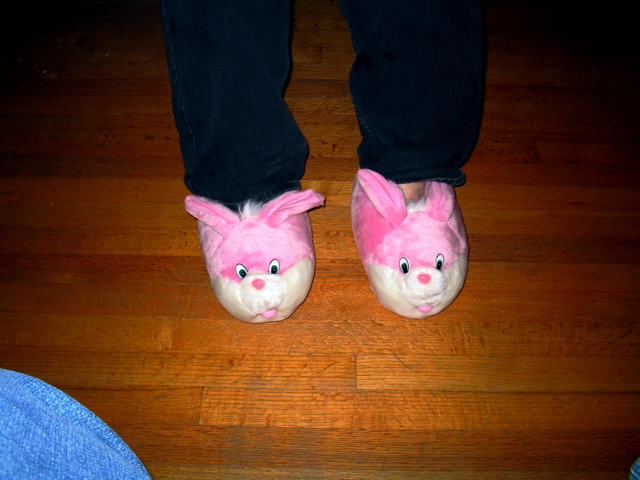
Someone wearing pink bunny slippers.

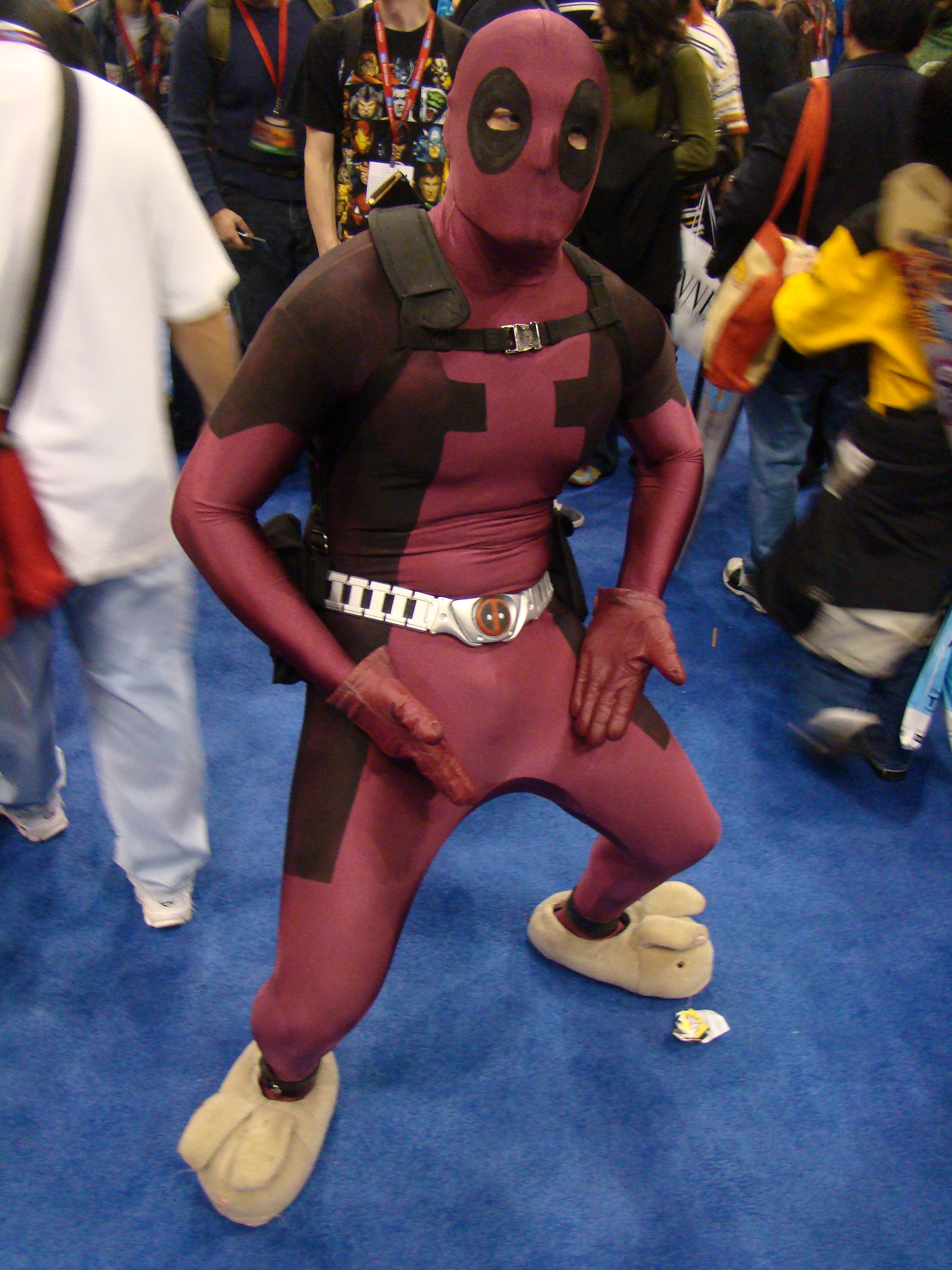
Deadpool Cosplayer at New York Comic-Con, Saturday, February7th, 2009 wearing bunny slippers

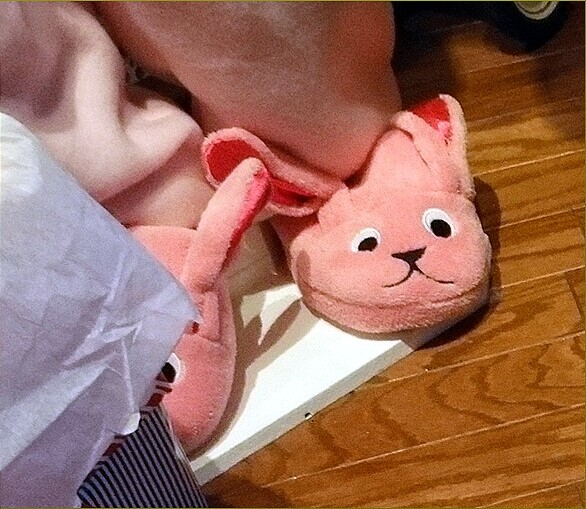
A Christmas Story bunny slipper costume piece

== See also ==
- List of shoe styles
- Nightwear
- Novelty Items
- Animal Hat
- Zoomorphism
- Material Culture
- Cartoons
- Prop Comedy
