= Knit cap =

Headwear

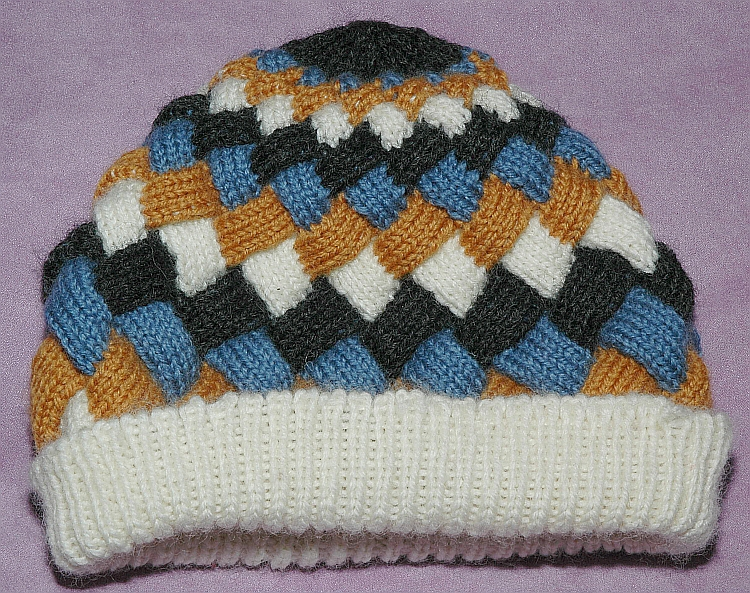
A knit cap

A knit cap is a piece of knitted headwear designed to provide warmth in cold weather. It usually has a simple tapered shape, although more elaborate variants exist. Historically made of wool, it is now often made of synthetic fibers.

Found all over the world where the climate demands warm clothing, knit caps are known by a variety of local names. In American English, this type of hat may be known as a beanie or a watch cap, while in Canadian English, a knit cap is known as a toque, touk, or tuque (pronounced /tuːk/).

== Construction ==
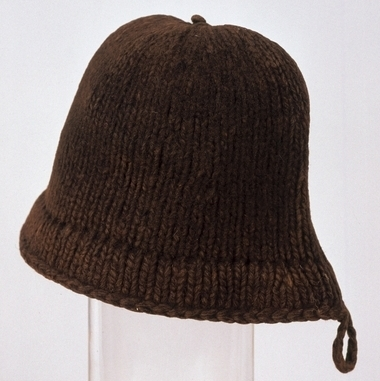
The only known example of an original "Monmouth cap", dating from the 16th century

Most knit caps are tapered at the top. The stretch of the knitting itself hugs the head, keeping the cap secure. They are sometimes topped with a pom-pom or loose tassels. Knit caps may have a folded brim, or none, and may be worn tightly fitting the head or loose on top. A South American tradition from the Andes Mountains is for the cap to have ear flaps, with strings for tying under the chin. A special type of cap called a balaclava folds down over the head with openings for just the face or for the eyes or mouth only.

Some modern variants are constructed as a parallel-sided tube, with a draw-string closure at one end. This version can be worn as a neck-warmer with the draw-string loose and open, or as a hat with the draw-string pulled tight and closed.

== Other names and history ==
Dating from the 15th century, the earliest type of knitted wool cap was produced in the Welsh town of Monmouth.

The earliest surviving example of a "Monmouth cap" is held by Monmouth Museum and was knitted from coarse 2 ply wool. The cap was made by casting on at the lower edge and knitting in the round towards the top. The crown consists of a classic rounded top, with the last remaining stitches cast off. The yarn tail was wrapped around just below the castoff stitches to gather them, leaving the little lump commonly, but inexactly, referred to as a button. The doubled brim was formed by picking up stitches inside the body of the cap, and worked down to the original cast on. The cast on loops were picked up, and a 3 needle bind-off worked to finish and join the inner brim to the outer cap, ending with a little loop.

Each hat was made weatherproof by felting, a process which reduced its size. The distance from the centre to the hem in this example varies between 5 and 6 inches (150 mm). Thousands of Monmouth caps were made, but their relatively low cost, and the ease with which the knitting could unravel, means that few remain.

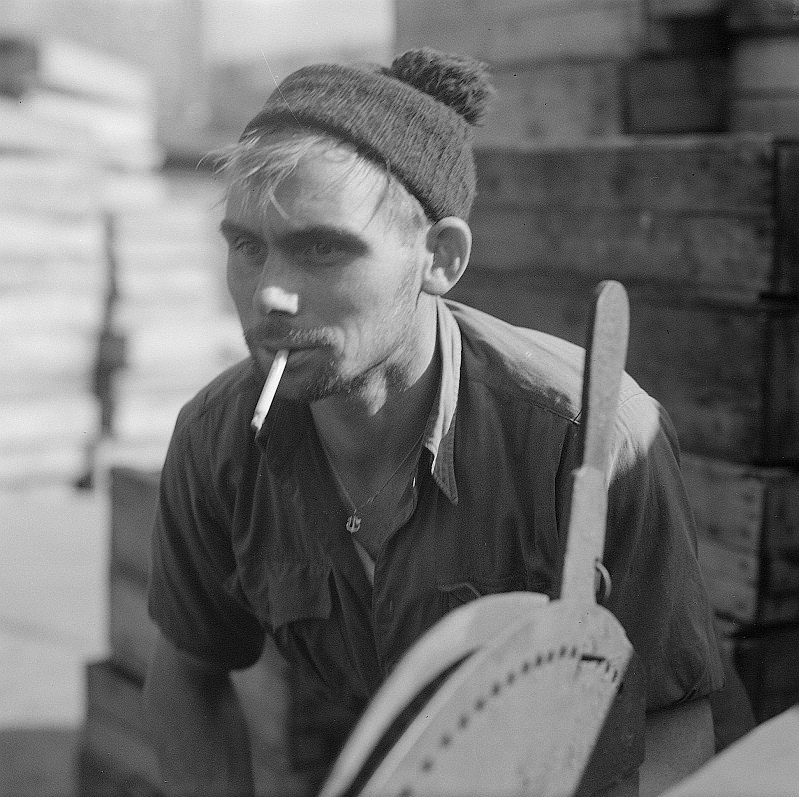
East German fisherman in 1963 wearing a bobble hat

Historically, the wool knit cap was an extremely common form of headgear for seamen, fishers, hunters and others spending their working day outdoors from the 18th century onward and is still commonly used for this purpose in the northern regions of North America, Europe, Asia and other cold regions of the world.

Being found all over the world where climate demands a warm hat, the knit cap can be found under a multitude of local names. In parts of the English-speaking world, this type of knitted hat is traditionally called a beanie. However, in parts of Canada and the US, the word 'beanie' can additionally be used to denote a different design of brimless cap, which is floppy and made up of joined panels of felt, twill, or other tightly woven cloth rather than being knitted.

A knitted cap with ear flaps is sometimes called a toboggan, or sherpa. The term toboggan is also sometimes used for knitted caps in Southern American English.

Members of the United States military commonly refer to a knitted cap as a watch cap, as it is the headgear worn while "standing watch" on a ship or guard post. In Western Pennsylvania English (Pittsburghese), it is known as a tossle cap. It may also simply be called a winter hat.

Other names for knitted caps include woolly hat (British English) or wool hat (American English); bobble hat, sock hat, knit hat, poof ball hat, bonnet, sock cap, stocking cap, skullcap, ski hat, sugan, chook and dut (in Hartlepool, England)

=== Balaclava ===
The pull-down knit cap that goes from the crown over the ears and around the neck, with a hole for the face, was known in the army of the British Empire as an Uhlan cap or Templar cap. During the Crimean War, handmade pull-down caps were sent to the British troops to help protect them from the bitterly cold weather before or after the Battle of Balaclava. The cap became popularly known a Balaclava helmet or just balaclava among the soldiers.

=== Scandinavian tophue ===
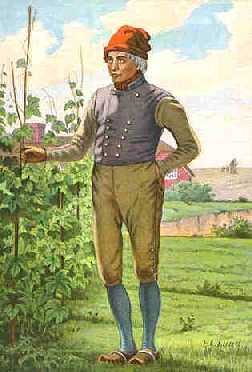
Danish farmer wearing traditional clothing, including red tophue

In Scandinavia, caps resembling a typical knit cap with a pom-pom have been in use since the Viking Age and possibly earlier. The terms tophue (Danish), topplue (Norwegian), toppluva (Swedish) mean 'top cap', and refer to the pom-pom.

The Viking-age Rällinge statuette, possibly a depiction of the god Freyr, wears what might be a pointed cap with pom-pom.

Early caps were probably sewn or made with nålebinding, but were knitted from the 17th century onwards, when knitting became known in Scandinavia. Inspired by the phrygian cap of the French Revolution, it became largely ubiquitous during the 18th and 19th century. It is still found in many of the Scandinavian folk costumes for men.

=== Canadian toque, tuque or touque ===
In Canadian English, a knit cap is more commonly known as a toque (pronounced /tuːk/; also spelled tuque or touque). It is traditionally made of wool and worn in the winter, though in recent years knit toques have resurfaced as an extremely popular daily fashion item. They are used all year round, not only outdoors for weather but as an indoor fashion accessory.

Toque is also commonly used across New England, especially among the working class. In Michigan's Upper Peninsula, it is called a chook or chuke.

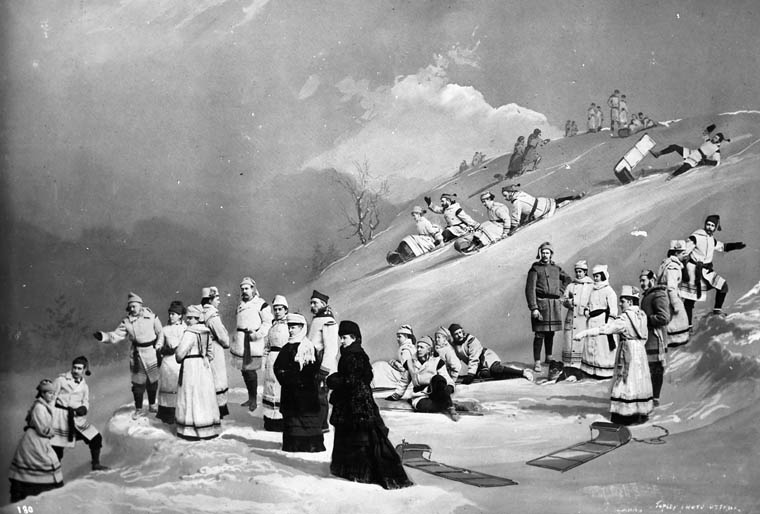
The Toboggan Party, Rideau Hall, illuminated composite photograph showing men wearing toques. From Lady Dufferin's personal album. c. 1872–1875.

The term tuque is French Canadian. It is widely known in Québecois culture as can be seen through its usage in La guerre des tuques.

The Canadian-English term was assimilated from the Canadian-French word tuque, and first appeared in this context around 1870. The fashion is said to have originated with the coureurs de bois, French and Métis fur traders, who kept their woollen nightcaps on for warmth during cold winter days. This spelling is attributed to a number of different sources, one being from Middle Breton, the language spoken by Breton immigrants at the founding of New France. In Old Breton, it was spelled toc; in Modern Breton, it is spelled tok, meaning simply 'hat'.

The French Canadian term likely has its origins with the long hats that were worn by the Voyageurs as they traversed westward on the rivers of North America. The term was picked up by the Blackfeet and entered Chinook Jargon, spreading to the Pacific and the Klondike. Another source suggests that it is a Francization of the Spanish tocar, to touch, as the long "end of the sock cap" of the Voyageurs hung down and touched their shoulders; yet another source suggests that the word is borrowed from "the old Languedoc dialect word tuc" meaning "summit" or "the head of a mountain".

The Canadian English spelling of toque, on the other hand, is borrowed from the original usage (see Toque). Toques include conical or plumed hats from previous centuries, the tall white hats worn by chefs, and modern snug hats. This spelling (toque) also appears in the 1941 Dictionary of Mississippi Valley French as a "style of hair-dressing among the Indians". This was a tall, conical hairstyle not unlike the shape of the Voyageur cap described above.

Dictionaries are divided on the matter of spelling, with the Gage Canadian preferring toque and the Nelson Canadian listing tuque (the Nelson Gage of a few years later would settle on toque). The first Dictionary of Canadianisms on Historical Principles lists separate entries and definitions for both toque and tuque which cross-reference each other. An illustrative line drawing is presented with the latter. Perhaps most importantly, the Canadian Oxford chose toque, and as the Canadian Press Stylebook bows to the Canadian Oxford as the final word in spelling, most Canadian publications have followed suit.

Though the requirement of the toque to have a pom-pom or no can be a hard line for some Canadians, most of the country agrees: one of these three spellings must be "correct," no matter what the hat's shape may be. As the Canadian Encyclopedia claims, "We all know a tuque when we see one, [we just] can't agree on how to spell the word."

The toque is similar to the Phrygian cap, and, as such, a red tuque during the 1837 Patriotes Rebellion became a symbol of French-Canadian nationalism. The symbol was revived briefly by the Front de libération du Québec (FLQ) in the 1960s. (Note: An image of an 1837 Patriote in a Phrygian cap can be seen in images of the published FLQ manifesto.) Despite this, the toque is also considered a symbol of Canadian identity, due to its ubiquity among English and French Canadians alike. It is also notable for having been the headwear of SCTV's Bob and Doug McKenzie.

The word is also occasionally spelled touque, though this is not considered a standard spelling by the Canadian Oxford Dictionary. In 2013, CBC Edmonton launched a poll to ask viewers how they spelled the word. The options given were toque, tuque or touque. Nearly 6,500 people voted, with Edmontonians remaining divided on the issue. Though touque was voted most popular in that instance, there is almost no formal usage to support its popularity. In some sections of Canada, a tuque with a brim on it, commonly worn by snowboarders, is nicknamed a bruque (a brimmed tuque).

=== British bobble hat ===
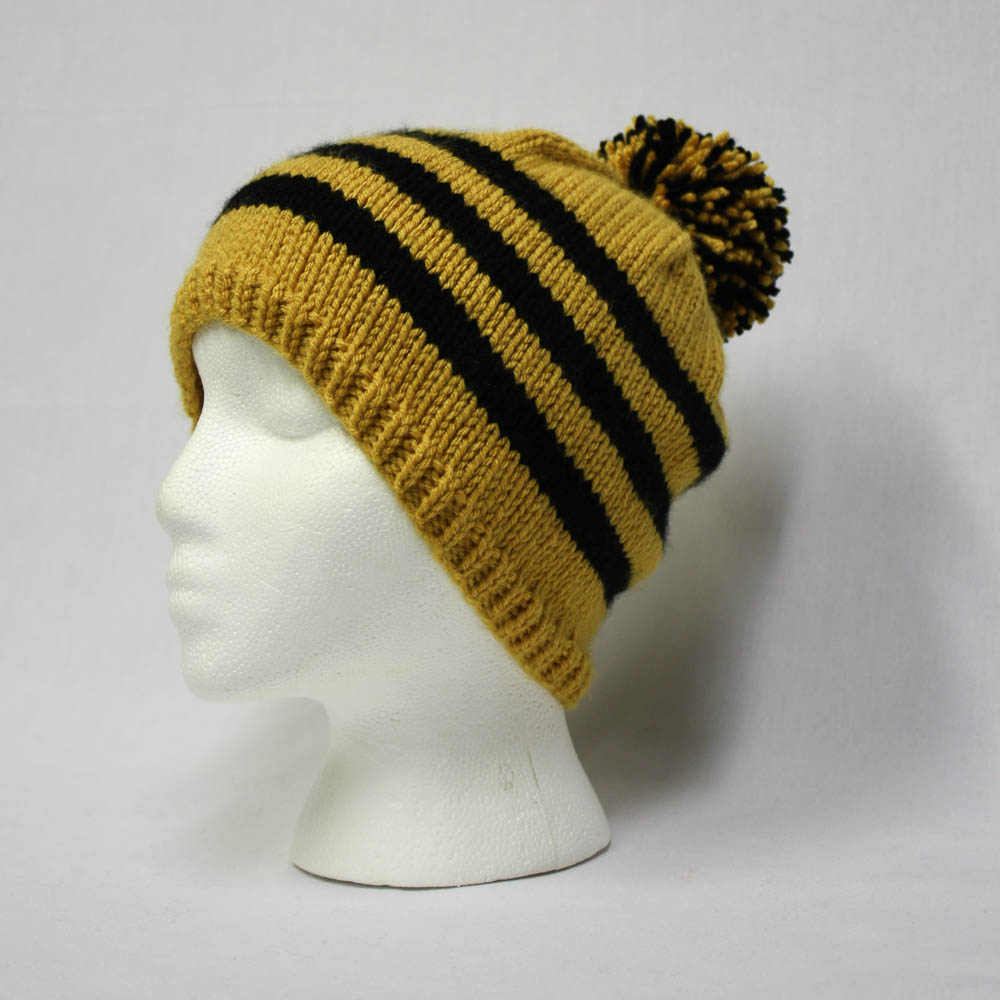
A bobble hat

In England, a knit cap may be known as a bobble hat, whether or not it has a yarn "bobble" or pom-pom on top.

Bobble hats were traditionally considered utilitarian cold-weather wear. In the early 21st century they were considered popular only with geeks and nerds. A surprise rise in popularity, driven initially by the Geek-Chic trend, saw them become a fashionable and with a real fur bobble, luxury designer item.

In the late 20th century, in the United Kingdom, they (like the anorak) were associated with utilitarian un-fashionability or with older football supporters, as they had been popular in club colours during the 1960s and 1970s. Along with the pin-on rosette and the football scarf, the bobble hat was seen as traditional or old-fashioned British working-class football regalia.

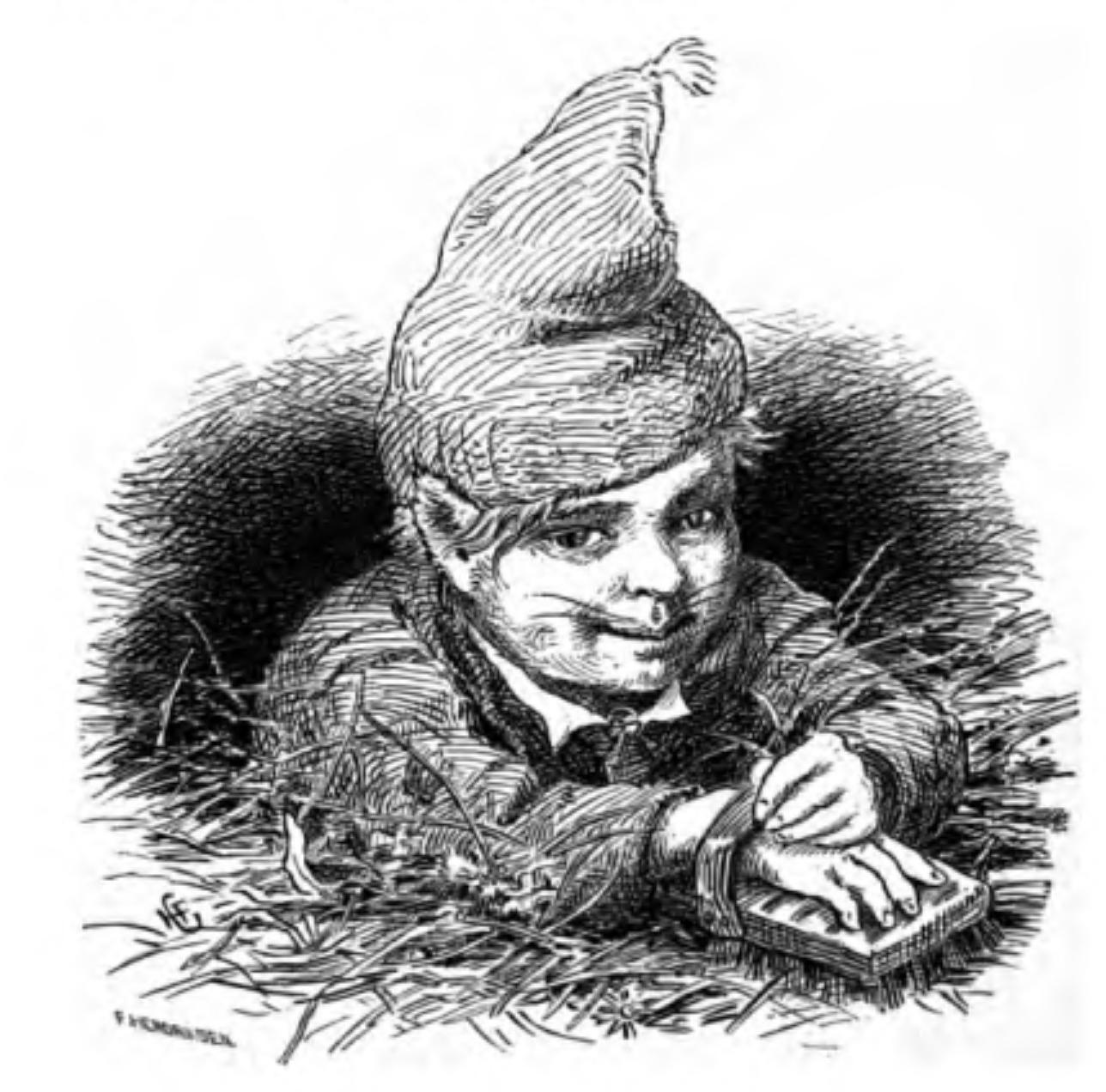
Scandinavian tomte with typical knit cap, Hans Gude 1896

== See also ==
- List of hat styles
- List of headgear
- Animal hat
- Balaclava (clothing)
- Barretina
- Beanie (seamed cap)
- Bonnet (headgear)
- Cap
- Chullo
- Do-rag
- Monmouth cap
- Phrygian cap
- Pussyhat
