= InPost =

Mail and package delivery company

InPost S.A.
- Type: Public
- Traded as: Euronext Amsterdam: INPST
- ISIN: LU2290522684
- Industry: Logistic Services
- Founded: 1999 (as Integer.pl Group) 2006 (as InPost S.A.)
- Founders: Rafał Brzoska
- Headquarters: Kraków, Poland
- Area served: Europe
- Products: APMs (lockers), PUDOs
- Number of employees: 5,000 +
- Parent: Integer.pl SA
- Subsidiaries: Judge Logistics (95.5%); Mondial Relay
- Website: inpost.eu

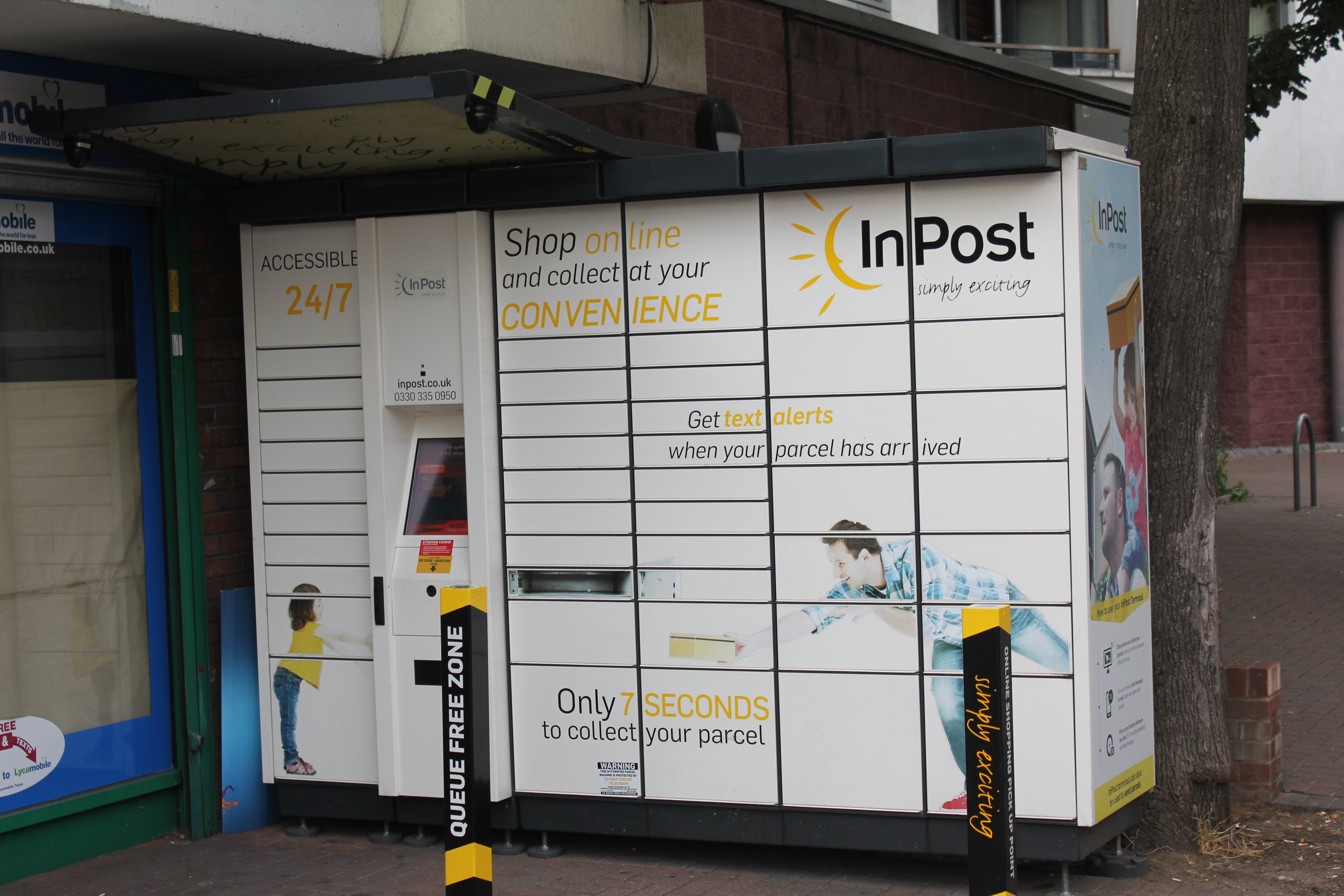
InPost parcel locker in London, UK

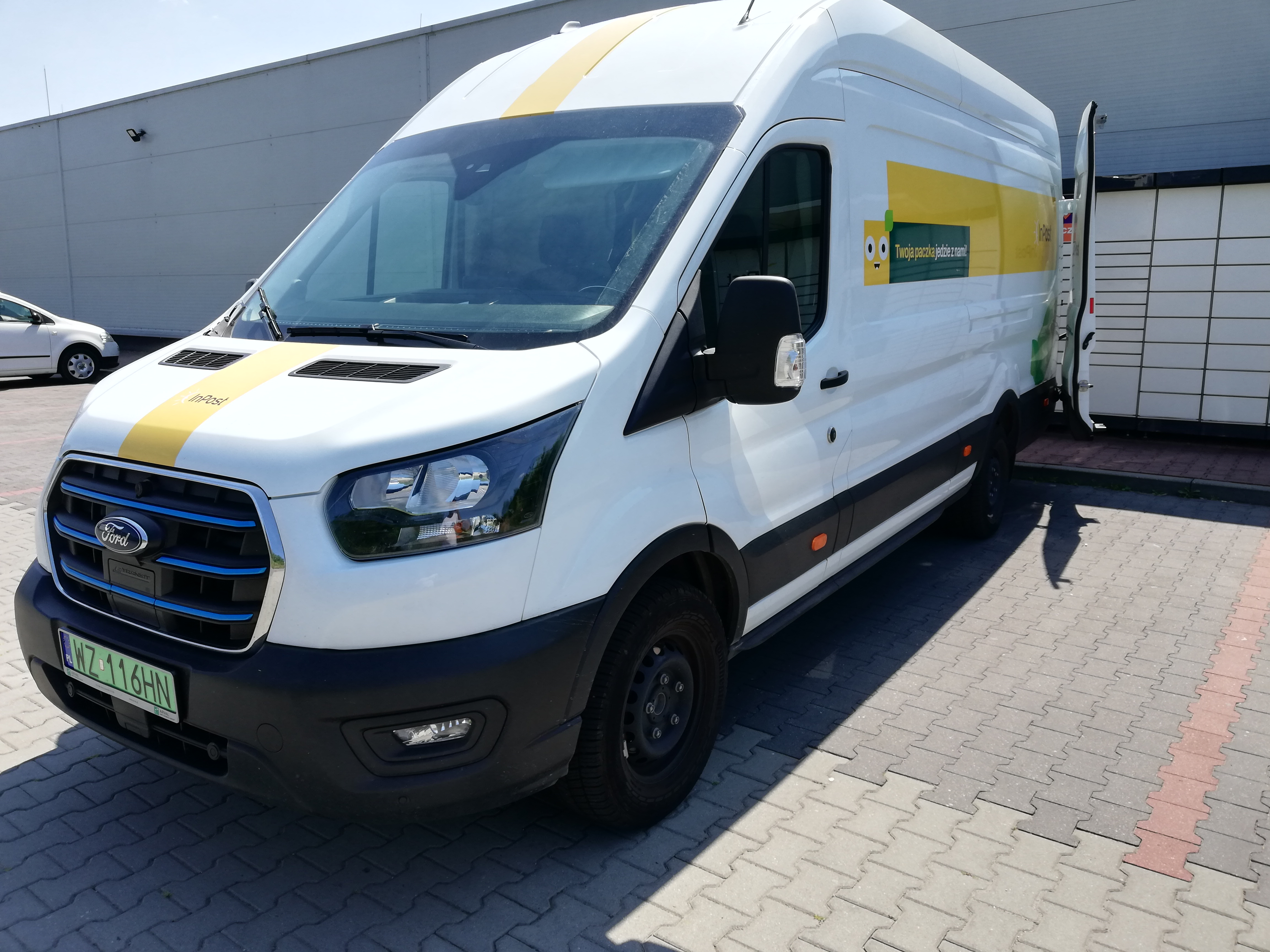
An InPost van delivering and collecting parcels

InPost S.A. is a Polish public logistics limited company with courier, package delivery and express mail service. It is based in Kraków, Poland, and is owned by Integer.pl corporate group. The company specializes in parcel locker service operating in Poland, Italy, United Kingdom, France, Benelux, Spain, and Portugal.

Founded in 2006 in Poland by Rafał Brzoska, InPost provides delivery services through a network of more than 20,000 lockers (Automated Parcels Machines or APMs) and 18,000 pick-up drop-off points (PUDOs), as well as to-door courier and fulfilment services to e-commerce merchants.

== History ==
Integer.pl Group was established in 1999 by Rafał Brzoska as a distribution of leaflets company. In 2006, InPost S.A. was founded as a subsidiary.

In 2009, The Integer.pl Capital Group introduced InPost Lockers – self-service machines for receiving and sending parcels. In 2015, the company's offering expanded to include courier service, and it also made its debut on the Warsaw Stock Exchange. The company has been cooperating with the American Advent International fund since 2017.

InPost SA went public in January 2021 on the Amsterdam Stock Exchange after its shareholders raised 2.8 billion euros as an online shopping boom, largely caused by pandemic lockdowns, increased demand for its automated parcel lockers. As a result, InPost's shares jumped 19%, valuing the company at 9.5 billion euros ($11.55 billion).

In July 2021, InPost acquired Mondial Relay, a logistics company from France, for a reported EUR 516 million. The firm's network of automated parcel machines in 2021 grew more than 50% in its core Polish market reaching 16,000 lockers.

In February 2022, the company announced that the InPost Mobile app, which was first launched in 2019, had over 9.3 million active users, making it Poland's second most popular e-commerce app. The company also reported it had delivered 744.9 million parcels in 2022. On June 30, 2022, the operator had a network of nearly 18,500 parcel machines nationwide.

In July 2023, the company acquired a £50 million stake in British logistics firm Menzies, which constitutes 30% of the company's total shares. InPost also expanded on the UK market with the installation of its 6,000th Parcel Locker and the delivery of 13.4 million parcels in the third quarter.

In April 2025, the company acquired the UK delivery service company Yodel, taking a 95.5% stake in the parent company Judge Logistics Ltd, in a debt-to-equity arrangement in which a loan worth £106m was converted into equity shares. A high court order was put in place in May 2025 preventing InPost from integrating the business or making any material changes spanning investment, leadership, restructuring and changes to the workforce until a dispute over ownership of the company was resolved. In December 2025 the high court ruled in InPost's favour, stating that Yodel's former owner "probably forged" signatures on warrants in an attempt to regain control of the company. InPost intends to phase out the Yodel brand in favour of its own.

In February, 2026, InPost was acquired for $9.2 billion by a consortium led by FedEx and Advent International.

== Sponsorships ==
Since 2022, InPost has sponsored the Poland men's national football team. In 2023, the company became the strategic sponsor of the Polish Cycling Federation. In the same year, InPost became an official sponsor of Premier League football club Newcastle United. In August 2024, InPost became the official logistics sponsor of Atletico Madrid.

In October 2023, Tour de France added Mondial Relay, owned by InPost Group, as one of its official partners. The company also endorses Polish athletes including Konrad Bukowiecki and Wojciech Nowicki.

== See also ==
- Economy of Poland
- List of Polish companies
