= Postman Pat =

British stop motion-animated TV series

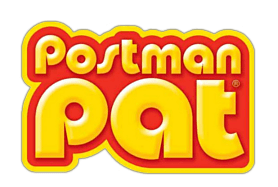
- Also known as: Postman Pat: Special Delivery Service (2008–2017)
- Genre: Animated television series Slice of life Stop motion Adventure
- Created by: John Cunliffe
- Developed by: Ivor Wood
- Directed by: Ivor Wood; Kitty Taylor; Derek Mogford; Chris Taylor
- Voices of: Ken Barrie; Carole Boyd; Lewis MacLeod; Kulvinder Ghir; Janet James; Archie Panjabi; Melissa Sinden; Anji Kreft; Shaun Harvey; Angela Griffin; Jimmy Hibbert; Bradley Clarkson
- Narrated by: Ken Barrie; Peter Sallis
- Opening theme: "Postman Pat"
- Ending theme: "Postman Pat" (Series 1–2) "Postman Pat (Can You Guess What's In His Bag?)" (Series 3–5) "Special Delivery Service" (Series 6–8)
- Composers: Bryan Daly (1981–1996); Simon Woodgate (2004–2012); Sandy Nuttgens (2013–2017)
- Country of origin: United Kingdom
- Original language: English
- No. of series: 8
- No. of episodes: 184 (list of episodes)

Production
- Executive producers: Theresa Plummer-Andrews; Michael Carrington; Chris Rose; Jane Smith; Oliver Ellis; Chris Bowden
- Producers: Debbie Pears; Jo Jorden; Owen Ballhatchet
- Editor: Martin Bohan
- Running time: 15 minutes (series); 30 minutes (specials)
- Production companies: Woodland Animations (1981–1996); Entertainment Rights (2003–2008); Cosgrove Hall Films (2003–2008); Classic Media (2013); Mackinnon and Saunders (2013–2017); DreamWorks Classic Productions (2016–2017)

Original release
- Network: BBC One
- Release: 16 September 1981 – 27 September 1982
- Network: Children's BBC on BBC One
- Release: 3 April – 8 September 1997
- Network: CBeebies
- Release: 7 September 2004 – 29 March 2017

Postman Pat is a British stop motion animated children's television series first produced by Woodland Animations. The series follows the adventures of Pat Clifton, a postman who works for the Royal Mail postal service in the fictional village of Greendale (inspired by the real valley of Longsleddale near Kendal).

Postman Pat was first broadcast on BBC One in 1981. John Cunliffe wrote the original treatment and scripts for the series, which was directed by animator Ivor Wood, who also worked on The Magic Roundabout, The Wombles, Paddington, and The Herbs. Following the success of the first series, four TV specials and a second series of thirteen episodes were produced during the 1990s. In this series, Pat had a family shown on screen for the first time (though his wife had been mentioned in a number of episodes).

A new version of the series was produced by Cosgrove Hall Films from 2004 to 2008 and expanded on many aspects of the original series.

The show ended on 29 March 2017, after eight series, twelve specials and five runs. The Special Delivery Service spin-off is still being rerun on CBeebies on weekends, and the previous Cosgrove Hall series from the 2000s was being rerun on ITVBe's children's block littleBe from September 2023 to May 2024. The original two Ivor Wood series are available to watch on BritBox, Prime Video and on DVD.

== Plot ==
Each episode follows the adventures of Patrick Clifton, a friendly country postman, and his black and white cat Jess, as he delivers the post through the valley of Greendale. Although he initially concentrates on delivering his letters, he nearly always becomes distracted by a concern of one of the villagers and is always keen to help resolve their problems. Notable villagers include the postmistress, Mrs. Goggins; farmer couple Alf and Dorothy Thompson; the Reverend Timms; PC Selby, the police constable; Jeff Pringle, the school teacher; Peter Fogg, a farm hand; George Lancaster, a chicken farmer; Sam Waldron, a grocer with a mobile shop; Miss Hubbard, an upper-class woman; Julia Pottage, who runs Greendale Farm, and Ted Glen, the local handyman and inventor.

== Setting ==
Postman Pat is set in the fictional village of Greendale and the nearby town of Pencaster, on the border between Cumbria and North Yorkshire.

Greendale has a different character in the various Postman Pat series. In the original series (1981–1996), it was a small village with narrow, winding roads. The gentle pace of life allowed Pat plenty of time to enjoy the countryside as he passed through, or even stop on quiet days to have a picnic.

In the more recent series from 2003 onwards, Greendale became a big, busy village situated in the heart of the Cumbrian countryside. Running through the centre of the village is the High Street, home to Mrs Goggins's Post Office and shop, an unofficial meeting place for residents. Located on the edge of the village is the railway station, home to the Greendale Rocket. Nisha Bains runs a popular café there with Sara while her husband Ajay runs a regular schedule on the Greendale Rocket to the nearby town of Pencaster.

In the second series of the show, which aired in 1996, the village at the centre of the series was briefly referred to as Garner Bridge, while Greendale was the name of the valley in which Garner Bridge was situated. In the episode Postman Pat and the Suit of Armour, Greendale Post Office is referred to as "Garner Bridge Post Office".

Pencaster is a large, bustling, modern town located within easy commuting distance for the villagers of Greendale. Situated on the waterfront, Pencaster boasts a market square in the centre surrounded by shops, houses, a large railway station, state-of-the-art buildings, and a boat jetty. Pencaster bears some resemblance to Lancaster, (the county town of Lancashire, which likewise is a short commute from Longsleddale) the area used as the inspiration for Greendale.

Ingledale is another large, busy town situated in the heart of the North Yorkshire countryside, only seen once in a special in 1991.

== Inspiration ==
Cunliffe, interviewed about the series, has said that he chose the character of a postman since he needed a character who could visit the countryside and interact with many different people.

The inspiration for the post office itself comes from one located on the street in Kendal where Cunliffe lived when he was writing the original treatment. The post office, at 10 Greenside, closed in 2003.

Cunliffe did not retain rights to the character and was critical of some of the tie-in media later released. He wrote the stories to the series Rosie and Jim, which he also presented, as a show which he could have more creative control over.

While Cunliffe visited post offices for inspiration, he has said that the character and village was not based on any one place or person. He commented in 2015 that "I got maybe half a dozen people last year saying they were the inspiration."

== Cast and characters ==
Postman Pat and his cat, Jess, in the original series

In Series 1, Ken Barrie voiced all the characters and narrated the series. In Series 2, Carole Boyd and Ken Barrie divided the roles: Barrie voiced all the male characters and Boyd voiced all the female characters and child characters except Granny Dryden, who was still voiced by Barrie. In Series 3, Kulvinder Ghir, Janet James, and Archie Panjabi joined to voice the new characters and the child characters, while Boyd continued to voice the adult females, Charlie and Sarah. Melissa Sinden and Jimmy Hibbert also joined to perform the animal characters' vocal effects and Angela Griffin joined in Series 5 to voice a new character (Amy Wrigglesworth). In Series 6, Lewis MacLeod replaced Barrie as Pat. In Series 7, Barrie left the series completely, and MacLeod, Bradley Clarkson, and Dan Milne took over the rest of Barrie's characters. Joe Trill joined in Series 8 to voice a new character.

- Ken Barrie as Patrick "Pat" Clifton (series 1–5), Matt Clifton, Mrs Goggins (series 1), Ted Glen (series 1–6), Alf Thompson (series 1–6), Dorothy Thompson (series 1), Bill Thompson (series 1), Reverend Peter Timms (series 1–6), Julia Pottage (series 1), Katy Pottage (series 1), Tom Pottage (series 1), PC Arthur Selby (series 2–6), Lucy Selby (series 1), Sylvia Gilbertson (series 1), Sarah Gilbertson (series 1), Jeff Pringle, Charlie Pringle (series 1), Rebecca Hubbard (series 1), Sam Waldron, Granny Dryden, Peter Fogg, Major Forbes, George Lancaster, Santa Claus, Train Inspector, Pumpkin Wrigglesworth, Narrator, Radio Greendale Speaker, John, George, Countdown Sequence Voice
- Lewis MacLeod as Patrick "Pat" Clifton (series 6–8), Ben Taylor, Robot 1, Sat Nav, Alf Thompson (series 7–8), Sean McGuinness
- Carole Boyd as Sara Clifton, Julian Clifton (series 2), Mrs. Goggins (series 2-present), Dorothy Thompson (series 2-present), Bill Thompson (series 2), Julia Pottage (series 2–5), Katy Pottage (series 2), Tom Pottage (series 2), Betty Pottage, Lucy Selby (series 2), Sylvia Gilbertson (series 2–8), Sarah Gilbertson (series 2–8), Jackie Gilbertson, Charlie Pringle (series 2–8), Rebecca Hubbard (series 2), George's Wife, Radio Weather Woman
- Kulvinder Ghir as Bill Thompson (series 3–8), Tom Pottage (series 3–5), Ajay Bains, Bessie Thompson, Michael Lam, Robot 2, Grizzly, Shopper-Bot 3000
- Janet James as Julian Clifton (series 3–8), Lucy Selby (series 3–8), Lauren Taylor
- Archie Panjabi as Katy Pottage (series 3–5), Nisha Bains, Meera Bains
- Melissa Sinden as Jess Clifton, Polly Clifton, Dotty Pringle, Bonnie Goggins
- Angela Griffin as Amy Wrigglesworth, Lizzy Taylor, Flora, Rowena Roberts, Duchess of Pencaster and a fact in the first season or two there was actually characters that were removed afterwards for certain historic reasons judging by a mustache on one of them.
- Bradley Clarkson as Ted Glen (series 7–8), Arthur Selby (series 7–8), ted Glen
- Dan Milne as Reverend Peter Timms (series 7–8)
- Joel Trill as Chris Beacon
- Professor Brian Cox as Professor Ryan Farrow (Guest star)

== Postman Pat: Special Delivery Service ==
In the spin-off series, Postman Pat: Special Delivery Service, Postman Pat has been promoted to Head of the SDS and is now called upon to deliver anything. Each episode follows Postman Pat on a Special Delivery mission, from rescuing a runaway cow to delivering a giant ice cube. In his new role, Postman Pat commutes to the nearby town of Pencaster where he collects his special deliveries from the Pencaster Mail Centre. Postman Pat now has a newer fleet of vehicles, including a bigger van, gyrocopter, 4x4 Jeep and motorbike, complete with sidecar for Jess. He has a new boss, Ben, who tends to give him instructions (whereas he was his own master before the "promotion"). Pat also seems to make more mistakes in his work since moving to SDS, largely because the new format is always based on one delivery, which has to go wrong somehow (thus often because of Pat's errors).

The series features an expanded and diverse cast, a fleet of new vehicles, a world full of gadgets and the new town of Pencaster. Postman Pat: Special Delivery Service first screened on BBC Two on 29 September 2008. The new series was commissioned by the BBC and produced by Entertainment Rights and Cosgrove Hall Films.

2 more series were aired in 2013 and 2016–2017 respectively.

== Episodes ==
Series	Episodes	Originally released	
Series	Episodes	First released	Last released
1	13	16 September 1981	27 September 1982
2	13	3 April 1997	8 September 1997
3	26	7 September 2004	14 October 2004
4	26	27 February 2006	10 May 2006
5	28	16 April 2007	24 December 2007
6	26	29 September 2008	19 December 2008
7	26	11 February 2013	20 December 2013
8	26	22 November 2016	29 March 2017
Specials	12	15 October 1990	2 October 2006

== Outside the main broadcast series ==
=== Film ===
Postman Pat: The Movie, a British-American computer-animated feature film version of the British stop-motion animated children's television show, was theatrically released on 23 May 2014 in the United Kingdom. The film was distributed and produced by Lionsgate and Icon Productions and animated by Rubicon Group Holding. The story revolves around Pat entering a talent show audition which leads to robots taking over his postal service whilst he is away. The film stars Stephen Mangan as the voice of Pat and also features Jim Broadbent, Rupert Grint, David Tennant, Ronan Keating (as Pat's singing voice), Susan Duerden, Sandra Teles, TJ Ramini and Peter Woodward.

=== Spin-off ===
A CGI spin-off to the series was made called Guess with Jess which follows Pat's cat Jess, now with the ability to talk, and his adventures with the farm animals. The series debuted on 9 November 2009 and ended in 2013.

=== Music ===
Music for the original 1981 series was by Bryan Daly, who wrote a number of songs including the well-known theme tune. For the 2003 series, pop writer Simon Woodgate scored the show and wrote new songs, including a new closing theme "Postman Pat (Can You Guess What's In His Bag?)". The theme tune "Postman Pat & His Black and White Cat" was sung by Ken Barrie for the original series in the 1980s and 1990s. An extended version of the tune was released as a single in the UK where it reached number 44 in the charts in July 1982. An album, titled Postman Pat: Songs and Music From the TV Series, was released by Post Music in 1982.

The theme tune and songs for Postman Pat Special Delivery Service (including "Special Delivery Service, What's It Going to Be Today?"), was recorded by Simon Woodgate at Echobass Studios.

In 2013, DreamWorks Classics released Postman Pat SDS series 2. The new 26-episode series retained Bryan Daly's original theme tune and Simon Woodgate's closing song, however new character themes and incidental music was composed by Sandy Nuttgens.

The theme song has undergone several adaptations; from 1994 to 2006, the theme tune had additional instruments such as synthesised strings and a tambourine. A similar edit had already been made to the 1993 album version, which was an edit of the original 1982 album version.

=== Books ===
As of 2009, over twelve million books, including storybooks, integrated learning books, colouring books, and multi-character magazines, have been sold worldwide.

=== Other ===
Longleat Safari Park had an outdoor reproduction of Greendale village, including the Post Office, the Cliftons' house and the Greendale station. It also had a miniature model of Greendale. It was installed during the 1990s, was relocated during 2008 in preparation for a new animal area and was revamped a third time for 2013. The attraction was closed at the end of 2015 and was permanently removed in 2016.

== Home media ==
=== DVD and VHS releases ===
==== United Kingdom ====
VHS and Betamax releases of Series 1 were originally released by Longman Video in the early-1980s, before BBC Enterprises secured them, and later released the four TV specials and Series 2 on VHS. For Series 1, the original opening titles which featured Pat driving in the original version of his van with a generic crown logo (which was used until Pat's Thirsty Day) was replaced with an edited version of the shot for shot remake of the original intro (which had Pat driving the Royal Mail Van) as used when the show aired in countries like France and Australia. The edits made to the intro on the DVD involved some shots being replaced by scenes from "Pat's Difficult Day", "Pat Takes A Message", and "Pat's Foggy Day". This edited intro was also used when CBeebies and BritBox reran the show.

After the sale of Woodland Animations to Entertainment Rights, the company began releasing VHS and DVDs of the revival series through their video label Right Entertainment and distributor Universal Pictures Video. Right released only one volume from the first two series on VHS and DVD – Postman Pat in a Muddle in April 2004, which contained three Series 2 episodes.

While no further releases were seen in the UK until 2011, Universal and Classic Media issued all four specials from 1991 to 1994 on the DVD Happy Birthday Postman Pat. On 3 February 2014, the first and second series were made available in their entirety for the first time in the UK.

=== International ===
DVD releases of the early series of Postman Pat were limited in availability in various regions, although the revival series is more common.

In 2004, the entire original series was released on DVD in Spain, featuring both English and Spanish audio options.

=== Other versions ===
In Scotland, the series was shown not only in English but also sometimes broadcast as Pàdraig Post, in Scottish Gaelic, on BBC Alba.

== Research study ==
"Slower-paced" and "faster-paced" episodes of Postman Pat were used in a 2021 research study on the effects of fast-paced television on children's cognitive and problem-solving abilities. The results of the study suggested that faster-paced television did not negatively impact children's attention spans, problem-solving, or comprehension.

== Awards and nominations ==
In 2006, Postman Pat was nominated for "Best Pre-school Animation" at the BAFTA Children's Awards.

== Parodies ==
- Harry Enfield & Chums featured a parody entitled "Il Postino Pat" (the show's Italian title), with an operatic reworking of the theme tune and the characters speaking in Italian, referencing the film Il Postino: The Postman. At the end, Pat instigates a communist revolution in Greendale before being shot and killed by fascist soldiers.
- Harry & Paul parodied Postman Pat in series 3 and 4 with "Parking Pataweyo", an African immigrant working as a stereotypically uncompromising traffic warden, played by Daniel Kaluuya, whose name and theme tune are based on Pat's.
- In 1987, Spitting Image, the topical satirical puppet series, featured "Temporary Postman Pratt" in a send-up of Royal Mail's employment of temporary postal workers during busy times. In the opening titles, Pratt can be seen driving a familiar (though yellow in colour) van along country roads before running over a black and white cat. Pratt likes to clear his workload as quickly as he can by dumping the post rather than delivering it. He is portrayed as a student who is lazy and rude. The segment was animated by Aardman Animations.
- In 1986, an episode of Bobby Davro on the Box featured Postman Pete, alongside other characters with spoofed names, such as Granny Wisden and Fred Ben. The segment was narrated and the theme tune was sung by the original series narrator, Ken Barrie.
- In 1997, an episode of The Treacle People briefly featured a section of the Postman Pat theme song, as a postcard was delivered by a walking postbox accompanied by a pink cat.
- In the round Scenes We'd Like to See on Mock the Week, series 15 episode 3, entitled Things you Wouldn't Hear on a Kids' TV Show, Miles Jupp recorded the following parodied lines: "Yodel delivery driver Pat, Yodel delivery driver Pat / He's thrown your parcel in a hedge".
- In 2009, The Brazilian show Casseta & Planeta Urgente parodied select episodes of series 6 under the title Carteiro Pot, o Serviço de Entregas Opcionais: in this parody, the theme tune had a synthesized instrumental and was performed by Fiuk and Marcelo Madureira with new lyrics by Casseta & Planeta.
