= List of Postman Pat episodes =

Postman Pat is a British stop-motion animated television series first produced by Woodland Animations. The series follows the adventures of Pat Clifton, a postman who works for the Royal Mail postal service in the fictional village of Greendale (inspired by the real valley of Longsleddale in Cumbria).

Postman Pat's first 13-episode series was screened on BBC1 during 1981 and 1982. John Cunliffe wrote the original treatment and scripts, and was directed by animator Ivor Wood, who also worked on The Magic Roundabout, Paddington, and The Herbs. Following the success of the first season, and that of several subsequent television specials, a second season of 13 episodes was produced by the same crew in 1996. Here, Pat has a family for the first time. A new version of the series was produced by Cosgrove Hall from November 2003, which expanded on many aspects of the original series.

== Series overview ==
Series	Episodes	Originally released	
Series	Episodes	First released	Last released
1	13	16 September 1981	27 September 1982
2	13	3 April 1997	8 September 1997
3	26	7 September 2004	14 October 2004
4	26	27 February 2006	10 May 2006
5	28	16 April 2007	24 December 2007
6	26	29 September 2008	19 December 2008
7	26	11 February 2013	20 December 2013
8	26	22 November 2016	29 March 2017
Specials	12	15 October 1990	2 October 2006

== Episodes ==
The episode number follows the first broadcast order.

=== Series 1 (1981–1982) ===
No. overall	No. in series	Title	Original release date
1	1	"Postman Pat's Finding Day"	16 September 1981
Pat calls to the post office, and today, most of the post is for Katy and Tom because it is their birthday. Along the way, Poor Katy has lost her doll, Sarah Ann.
2	2	"Postman Pat and the Magpie Hen"	23 September 1981
It is a warm day and Pat stops for a picnic lunch near Thompson Ground halfway through his round. He falls asleep in the warm sunshine and while he sleeps a magpie hen causes him a great deal of trouble as the thieving hen steals his sandwich and keys.
3	3	"Postman Pat's Birthday"	30 September 1981
Pat always thought he had managed to keep the date of his birthday to himself.
4	4	"Pat's Rainy Day"	7 October 1981
It is a heavy rainy day in Greendale. It has been raining so hard that even the letters are wet when Pat goes to the post office and comes to collect them.
5	5	"The Sheep in the Clover Field"	14 October 1981
It is a cloudy morning, but the sun brightens up, and Pat is having a late day after his van gets stuck in the mud.
6	6	"Pat's Tractor Express"	21 October 1981
Pat calls at the post office to collect a registered letter to the camp site, and a parcel for Granny Dryden.
7	7	"Pat's Thirsty Day"	28 October 1981
There has not been any rain in Greendale for weeks. The lakes have almost dried up and the water has been turned off. But there is an old pump in the village; perhaps Ted Glenn can fix it.
8	8	"Pat's Windy Day"	4 November 1981
It is a windy day in Greendale and Pat has problems doing his job. He cannot steer his van in such a big wind, Alf Thompson was nearly blown off his feet and Pat's hat was blown off his head. Peter Fogg has to cut up a fallen tree to unblock the road before Pat can get through with the post.
9	9	"Pat's Foggy Day"	3 March 1982
There is thick fog in Greendale and Pat has to drive very slowly. Pat stops at the post office to have a cup of tea, and a biscuit. When he gets out of the van to give a letter to Ted Glenn he gets lost in the fog and can't find Jess or his van. Soon he feels silly when he thinks a scarecrow is Ted and gives him a letter.
10	10	"Pat's Difficult Day"	6 September 1982
Pat's alarm clock fails to wake him up and nothing seems to be going right for him. First, he forgets his hat, then he trips over Jess, he gets his fingers covered in tape, drops Ted's parcel and, he then gets his hand hurt from Alf's bucket.
11	11	"Pat Goes Sledging"	10 March 1982
Heavy snow has fallen in Greendale, and Peter has to clear the roads with his tractor and bulldozer blade.
12	12	"Letters on Ice"	20 September 1982
Another snowfall has fallen in Greendale, and it is a very hard winter.
13	13	"Pat Takes a Message"	27 September 1982
It has been wild and windy in Greendale, and the telephone lines are down.

=== Series 2 (1997) ===
No. overall	No. in series	Title	Original release date
14	1	"Postman Pat and the Hole in the Road"	2 September 1996 (Home video); 3 April 1997 (Television)
Mr. Pringle has been teaching the children about volcanoes and earthquakes.
15	2	"Postman Pat and the Suit of Armour"	2 September 1996 (Home video); 10 April 1997 (Television)
Garner Hall is opening to the public. Ted builds a shiny suit of metal armour, and when he decides to try the suit on, he can't see where he is going. He crashes about, making an awful clanking noise.
16	3	"Postman Pat in a Muddle"	2 September 1996 (Home video); 17 April 1997 (Television)
A huge parcel arrives at the post office and it squashes Pat's glasses after he puts them down onto the counter. Mrs. Goggins lends Pat one of her old pairs of glasses. Pat still can't see properly, meaning he can't read or drive his van, so Ted offers to take him in his lorry. Note: This is the only episode in which Jess the cat does not appear.
17	4	"Postman Pat Misses the Show"	2 September 1996 (Home video); 24 April 1997 (Television)
The villagers prepare for a Greendale arts show. Ted lends Pat some clay, but it makes a mess. Pat makes a clay sculpture of Jess. When he is travelling to the art show, his van runs out of petrol. Sam lends him some more petrol, but it soon runs out again; however, he manages to make it to the show on foot, and the tail part of Pat's sculpture of Jess saves the day when the school pipes had burst.
18	5	"Postman Pat Follows a Trail"	1 May 1997
Pat finds a long string across the road, and follows it to see where it leads. It leads to a tree where Katy and Tom's kite is stuck. Pat needs to find someone with a ladder, so he can rescue the kite.
19	6	"Postman Pat Has the Best Village"	8 May 1997
The villagers prepare to enter the best village competition. Will Greendale win first prize – and where has Ted's lorry got to?
20	7	"Postman Pat Paints the Ceiling"	15 May 1997
Pat offers to paint the ceiling for Granny Dryden, but some white paint spills down all over his trousers. Pat goes home to change and gets an odd pair of trousers, and Sarah can't help laughing. During his rounds, everyone wonders why on Earth Pat is out doing his rounds in his shorts.
21	8	"Postman Pat Has Too Many Parcels"	22 May 1997
Mail order madness has taken over Greendale, meaning Pat has a lot more parcels than usual. Ted devises a motorised scooter to make Pat's job easier, but it proves to be more trouble than it is worth...
22	9	"Postman Pat and the Big Surprise"	29 May 1997
Pat does some gardening before work. When he tries to remove a weed, he sprains his back and Sara calls Dr. Gilbertson in. Pat needs a day in bed, so Sara offers to take the post instead. Everyone is surprised to see Sara delivering the post instead of Pat. Sara has also forgotten something.
23	10	"Postman Pat and the Robot"	5 June 1997
Ted invents a new robot postman to help give Pat a rest. When it goes out for its test run and arrives at the post office, it scares Mrs. Goggins. When it gets loaded with the post, it causes havoc over Greendale. Pat and Ted follow after the robot in Pat's post bus.
24	11	"Postman Pat Takes Flight"	1 September 1997
Major Forbes prepares for a film show about his balloon flights across the world. When Pat arrives at Garner Hall, the major asks Pat to climb onto the roof, untangle the string and cast him off into the sky. Unfortunately, it sets off with Pat still clinging to the basket up and up and away!
25	12	"Postman Pat and the Beast of Greendale"	5 September 1997
A strange creature is on the loose all over Greendale. First, it chewed up Pat's sandwiches, then Dorothy's carrots, then Granny Dryden's washing line, knocks Miss Hubbard off her bike, then breaks Major Forbes flower pots and it makes a racket in the Village Church! Who can it be?
26	13	"Postman Pat and the Mystery Tour"	8 September 1997
Pat is due to take Mr. Pringle and the school children on a Mystery Tour on the post bus. They get their clues from Granny Dryden, Major Forbes, Miss Hubbard, Peter Fogg, Mrs. Goggins and Ted Glen, but where will they end up?

=== Series 3 (2004) ===
No. overall	No. in series	Title	Original release date
27	1	"Postman Pat and the Runaway Kite"	5 April 2004 (Home video); 7 September 2004 (Television)
The villagers prepare to enter Ajay's kite festival. Jess loves all the activity but his curiosity gets the better of him when he steps onto Ted's kite and it takes off.
28	2	"Postman Pat and the Hungry Goat"	8 September 2004
Alf's goat Rosie escapes, so Pat and Alf help to round her up but not she does a lot damage like eating the labels off Pat's parcels.
29	3	"Postman Pat and the Ice Cream Machine"	9 September 2004
Ted invents an ice cream machine for the picnic. When the power cuts out, the ever-inventive Ted tries all kinds of ways to get his machine back in action – including connecting it up to Pat's van.
30	4	"Postman Pat and the Great Greendale Race"	10 September 2004
The villagers have a race to see whose vehicle is the best. Whose vehicle will be the best?
31	5	"Postman Pat and the Jumble Sale"	14 September 2004
It is National Recycling Week and Nisha is organizing a jumble sale.
32	6	"Postman Pat the Magician"	15 September 2004
Pat is to be a magician at Meera's birthday party, and Ted builds a magic stage to make Jess disappear.
33	7	"Postman Pat and the Spotty Situation"	16 September 2004
When a nasty bout of chicken pox spreads around Greendale, Pat spends a busy day delivering calamine lotion to everyone who needs it.
34	8	"Postman Pat and the Greendale Movie"	17 September 2004
Pat receives his own video camera and goes round making a video diary of Greendale's events.
35	9	"Postman Pat Goes Football Crazy"	21 September 2004
Pat and Julian are to take part in a Greendale football match. Will Pat still have all his skills?
36	10	"Postman Pat's Pigeon Post"	22 September 2004
Pat offers to take Alf's racing pigeon Cederic to the vets in Pencaster, but his van runs out of petrol. Will anyone be able to find Pat?
37	11	"Postman Pat and a Job Well Done"	5 April 2004 (Home video); 23 September 2004 (Television)
Julian is to give a class talk about peoples' jobs, so Pat takes him on his round to find out while Ted varnishes the schoolroom floor.
38	12	"Postman Pat and the Green Rabbit"	24 September 2004
Pat offers to babysit Nikhil during his round while Julian goes with Sara, Nisha and Meera to the cinema in Pencaster, but Nikhil gets upset whenever his green rabbit toy disappears.
39	13	"Postman Pat and the Big Butterflies"	27 September 2004
Two escaped butterflies from Pencaster Zoo go on the loose in Greendale. Whoever catches them will get free tickets to the zoo, so the children try to catch them.
40	14	"Postman Pat and the Troublesome Train"	28 September 2004
Pat has a day off, so he offers to help Ted and Ajay to drive the Greendale Rocket.
41	15	"Postman Pat and the Flying Saucers"	29 September 2004
The children are out hunting for UFOs, whilst Ted's new invention – the Washer-Sorter machine – is playing up. Later, a strange bubble creature appears in the station café...
42	16	"Postman Pat at the Seaside"	30 September 2004
The children are bored on a sunny day. Meanwhile, some sand falls off the back of Ted's lorry and onto the road.
43	17	"Postman Pat and the Job Swap Day"	1 October 2004
The school roof needs repairing so Pat suggests that Greendale has a job swap day to raise enough sponsorship money.
44	18	"Postman Pat's Disappearing Dotty"	4 October 2004
Julian is looking after the school guinea pig, Dotty, but on her first night at the Clifton residence, she escapes. The next morning, everyone is looking for Dotty. When Pat leaves for work, it turns out she is following him on his rounds...
45	19	"Postman Pat's Popstars"	5 October 2004
Everyone in Greendale is auditioning for Charlie and Julian's new band. It seems no one is right, but will Lucy Selby have the confidence to audition?
46	20	"Postman Pat and the Great Dinosaur Hunt"	6 October 2004
Pat, Ted and the villagers are working hard on a very special surprise for the children. Meanwhile, the children are looking for dinosaurs, and it is not long before they find one...
47	21	"Postman Pat and the Spooky Sleepover"	7 October 2004
Julian's friends are staying for a sleep over, but Jess has disappeared and there's a strange noise coming from the cupboard under the stairs...
48	22	"Postman Pat and the Midsummer Market"	8 October 2004
It is always been a tradition for the reverend Timms to ring the church bells at the start of Greendale's midsummer market. However, when Alf's racing pigeon Cedric settles next to the bell, it becomes impossible...
49	23	"Postman Pat and the Train Inspector"	11 October 2004
Ajay receives a letter and learns that the Greendale station and Rocket locomotive are to be inspected that afternoon. The other villagers lend a hand and Ajay passes with flying colours.
50	24	"Postman Pat and the Ice Ladder"	12 October 2004
The children are having a great time sledging, but disaster strikes when Katy and Tom get stuck on an icy pond. How can Pat and Alf's ladder help?
51	25	"Postman Pat and the Rocket Rescue"	13 October 2004
It is still winter in Greendale, and the children are making a snowman. Then, they lose control of a large snowball and it crashes onto the railway line, but the Greendale Rocket is on its way...
52	26	"Postman Pat's Perfect Painting"	14 October 2004
Pat delivers a new supply of arts materials to the school. There, the children are making pictures of their favourite adventure from the past year. Everyone except Sara Gilbertson, who cannot think of anything. The children make sculptures and drawings to show to their parents at the school open day.

=== Series 4 (2006) ===
No. overall	No. in series	Title	Original release date
53	1	"Postman Pat and the Big Balloon Ride"	27 February 2006
Mrs. Goggins is feeling sad, so Pat plans to take her on a ride in Ted's old hot air balloon. Then, when Ted is called away, things do not exactly go according to the plan...
54	2	"Postman Pat and the Surprise Present"	28 February 2006
It is Dr. Gilbertson's birthday, but after Pat gives her a lift, she tells him she has not got time to bother celebrating. Pat and the other villagers all decide to throw a special party for her: Ted, Ajay, Pat and PC Selby works hard to restore a vintage car as a birthday present, the children compose a special song, and Nisha and Sarah make the birthday tea.
55	3	"Postman Pat and the Perfect Pizza"	1 March 2006
Ajay and Pat all make pizzas.
56	4	"Postman Pat and the Spring Dance"	2 March 2006
Everyone is practicing different dances for Greendale's spring dance, but Pat is not very good at dancing. Ted helps Pat out by teaching him how to dance. Later, Pat is able to surprise Sara by whisking her onto the dance floor.
57	5	"Postman Pat and the Thunderstorm"	3 March 2006
Julian is afraid of thunder and lightning, as is Mrs. Goggins. Bonnie goes missing, so Pat and Julian brave the thunderstorm to find her. Julian overcomes his fear by putting Bonnie's needs first. Note: This episode was banned on Cbeebies, due to the thunder and lightning in the episode's frightening nature.
58	6	"Postman Pat and the Fancy Dress Party"	21 March 2006
Lucy does not have anything to wear to the fancy dress party.
59	7	"Postman Pat and the Playful Pets"	6 March 2006
Jess and Bonnie are in a very playful mood today, but their mischief ends up causing trouble all over Greendale. Meanwhile, Pat helps Ted build a treehouse for the Pottage twins.
60	8	"Postman Pat and the Pink Slippers"	7 March 2006
Ted invents a sock drying machine which, unfortunately, destroys Pat's socks so he has to borrow a pair of pink fluffy bunny slippers, which he wears for the rest of the day. Meanwhile, the children are off on a fruit hunt.
61	9	"Postman Pat and the Runaway Train"	8 March 2006
The Reverend Timms inadvertently starts the Greendale Rocket. Pat and PC Selby give chase in the patrol car, while Ajay and Mr. Pringle are in hot pursuit on the railway pump-trolley...
62	10	"Postman Pat and the Pet Show"	9 March 2006
Sarah Gilbertson borrows Jess to enter him in the pet show, but he runs away.
63	11	"Postman Pat's Wild West Rescue"	10 March 2006
Julian, Meera and Bill play at being cowboys. After riding a bucking bronco, Pat helps them round up a missing sheep.
64	12	"Postman Pat's Pied Piper"	13 March 2006
A group of mice are causing more trouble.
65	13	"Postman Pat and the Tricky Transport Day"	14 March 2006
When Pat's van breaks down one snowy day, he has to use a lot of different vehicles to finish his round.
66	14	"Postman Pat's Radio Greendale"	15 March 2006
When the kids put on an amateur radio show in the school, Charlie and the children learn the importance of working as a team.
67	15	"Postman Pat the Secret Superhero"	16 March 2006
Charlie and Bill are eager to see a superhero in Greendale, but cannot find one. Then, the post falls out of his van and Pat goes to extraordinary lengths to retrieve it.
68	16	"Postman Pat Goes Undercover"	17 March 2006
Tom has his doubts about going on a camping trip with Pat, Jeff and the other children.
69	17	"Postman Pat and the Bowling Buddies"	20 March 2006
Pat and PC Selby plan a bowling night at Greendale; Ajay and Ted both want Pat to be their bowling partner, and Sarah is upset when Lucy gets an imaginary friend.
70	18	"Postman Pat and the Magic Lamp"	22 March 2006
The children make a wish that they regret.
71	19	"Postman Pat and the Sneaky Sheep"	23 March 2006
Alf's sheep are causing trouble in Greendale.
72	20	"Postman Pat's Island Shipwreck"	24 March 2006
Ted saves the day when Pat's boat trip goes wrong.
73	21	"Postman Pat and the Grand Custard Race"	27 March 2006
At the annual sports day, Bill realises that taking part is more important than winning, and is rewarded with a Best Team Player rosette. Then, the adults have a mucky custard race, which ends with Pat covered in custard.
74	22	"Postman Pat and the Lucky Escape"	28 March 2006
Pat and the reverend are accidentally locked in the vestry. While PC Selby and the others chase after Dr. Gilbertson to retrieve the vestry key, Pat and reverend Timms find a way to escape through an underground passage.
75	23	"Postman Pat and the Pot Luck Picnic"	29 March 2006
It is the Greendale Rocket's 100th birthday, and everyone prepares a dish to bring to a potluck picnic. Pat and Ted organise a surprise firework display to celebrate the great occasion.
76	24	"Postman Pat and the Record Breaking Day"	30 March 2006
Ajay bets Pat that he cannot deliver all the post by teatime. The loser has to run around Greendale in their pyjamas. Pat wins the bet. Meanwhile, the kids are enjoying a different sort of math lesson by counting and breaking records for skipping, hopping on one leg and catching a ball.
77	25	"Postman Pat's Missing Things"	31 March 2006
PC Selby has a busy day when Jess, Mabel the sheep and the Greendale Rocket all go missing. Helped by Pat, he finds them in the Greendale Tunnel, where clever Jess stopped the train before it hit a trapped Mabel.
78	26	"Postman Pat and the Flying Post"	10 May 2006
It is Nikhil's birthday. Ted ties helium balloons to Pat's postbag, and it goes flying off into the air. Pat and PC Selby give chase. Ted is able to make use of his hover-backpack to reach the bag and pop the balloons. Meanwhile, Lucy opens a parcel from her aunt and discovers a balloon modelling kit, so Nikhil can have birthday balloons after all.

=== Series 5 (2007) ===
No. overall	No. in series	Title	Original release date
79	1	"Postman Pat and the Bollywood Dance"	16 April 2007
Sarah and Meera are practicing a traditional Indian dance for the school assembly, but Meera's sari has not arrived.
80	2	"Postman Pat and the Stolen Strawberries"	17 April 2007
Pat visits Dorothy, who tells him that all her strawberries have gone missing. Pat saves the day, with a little help from PC Selby and his banjo.
81	3	"Postman Pat and the Pot of Gold"	18 April 2007
Pat and the other parents decide to brighten up the school by painting a rainbow on the wall. Meera also teaches them a song to remember the colours of the rainbow.
82	4	"Postman Pat and the Greendale Knights"	19 April 2007
Pat has a surprise in store for Sarah while Lucy faces her fear...
83	5	"Postman Pat and the Fantastic Feast"	20 April 2007
A famous chef disappoints the residents of Greendale by not being able to visit, but Pat is able to organise a great day.
84	6	"Postman Pat Gets Stuck"	23 April 2007
Pat finds himself in an awkward situation and relies on some animals for help.
85	7	"Postman Pat and the Incredible Inventions"	24 April 2007
Ted has some visitors to stay when Pat's house floods.
86	8	"Postman Pat and the Go-Kart Race"	25 April 2007
The residents of Greendale learn that cheats never prosper.
87	9	"Postman Pat's Pet Rescue"	26 April 2007
Jess gets into a tricky situation and needs Amy's help to get him out of it.
88	10	"Postman Pat's Pony Post"	27 April 2007
Pat has overcome his fear of horses, which has given him the chance of delivering the post on horseback.
89	11	"Postman Pat's Clifftop Adventure"	21 May 2007
Pat and Amy come to the rescue of Bessie the sheep when she gets stuck on the edge of a cliff.
90	12	"Postman Pat and the Lost Property"	22 May 2007
Meera and Julian decide to set up a lost property office and find all sorts of 'lost property' outside other people's houses.
91	13	"Postman Pat and the Talking Cat"	23 May 2007
Julian and Charlie attach a walkie talkie to Jess' collar, to fool people into thinking that he can talk.
92	14	"Postman Pat and the Hedgehog Hideaway"	24 May 2007
Mrs. Goggins finds a hedgehog in the garden behind the post office.
93	15	"Postman Pat Never Gives Up"	25 May 2007
A special delivery for Amy causes problems as Pat struggles to deliver the enormous crate.
94	16	"Postman Pat and the Double Disguise"	28 May 2007
Tom and Katy want to be grown-ups so they can help out, but they soon discover that being small has its advantages.
95	17	"Postman Pat's Cat Calamity"	29 May 2007
The children are playing at being space explorers, but fall out with Sara, because she is being bossy again. Meanwhile, Jess has gotten himself stuck up a tree. How can Ted's new invention, a litter blower help?
96	18	"Postman Pat and the Popular Policeman"	30 May 2007
PC Selby tells Pat and Julian that he's leaving Greendale. Everyone is upset, but Pat organises a party to show PC Selby how much he is loved.
97	19	"Postman Pat's Noisy Day"	31 May 2007
Pat is feeling very musical today. He keeps hearing strange and interesting sounds around Greendale.
98	20	"Postman Pat and the Disappearing Bear"	7 May 2007
Pat comes across his beloved old teddy, Billy, and lets Julian take it to school. Unfortunately, Julian swaps the bear with Charlie and it keeps changing hands all day. Will it ever find its way back to Pat?
99	21	"Postman Pat and the Cranky Cows"	8 May 2007
With another strange package to deliver to Ted, Pat sets off across the village, eager to find out what is inside.
100	22	"Postman Pat and the Big Boat Adventure"	9 May 2007
Pat has a special package to help Ted fix his boat. Unfortunately, the pair end up adrift on the lake.
101	23	"Postman Pat's Holiday Hobbies"	10 May 2007
There is no post today in Greendale, so Pat has a day off. Sara suggests he should keep himself busy with a new hobby.
102	24	"Postman Pat and the Grumpy Pony"	11 May 2007
Ted is fixing the hitch on the horse box, so Amy and Meera take Pumpkin for a roam around Greendale.
103	25	"Postman Pat's Fun Run"	14 May 2007
It is the day of the children's fun run. Bill sets his sights on the mystery prize.
104	26	"Postman Pat's Spy Mission"	15 May 2007
It is a light day for post, so Pat offers to help Ted with his chores when Ted sprains his ankle.
105	27	"Postman Pat's Ice'Capade"	17 October 2007
It is winter in Greendale and everything is turned to ice - including the engine on the Greendale Rocket.
106	28	"Postman Pat's Christmas Eve"	24 December 2007
Pat has to come to the rescue when Ajay gets stuck in a snowdrift with a Christmas tree.

=== Series 6: Special Delivery Service (2008) ===
This is the first season of Postman Pat: Special Delivery Service.

No. overall	No. in series	Title	Original release date
107	1	"Pat's Special Delivery: A Runaway Cow"	29 September 2008
The world has been extended to include Pencaster and Pat has been promoted to the head of the Special Delivery Service, a service dedicated to delivering anything, anywhere. Pat now works for his new boss, Ben, and has a selection of new vehicles including a Special Delivery helicopter (PAT 3), a new, larger eco-van (PAT 2), a delivery motorbike (PAT 5), and a new Special Delivery mini-van based on the 'PAT 1' van (PAT 4). Pat's first mission is to deliver Daisy the cow safely to Alf Thompson, but Daisy has a bad habit of running away.
108	2	"Pat's Special Delivery: A Tepee"	30 September 2008
Pat sets out to deliver a prize for the annual treasure hunt. Only the children's teacher, Lauren, knows the location of the secret treasure, but, when Pat loses Lauren's letter, he must take part in the treasure hunt himself to help find it.
109	3	"Pat's Special Delivery: A Wind Machine"	1 October 2008
Pat is given the task of delivering a wind machine to Ted Glen at his workshop. But gusty weather conditions make the task much more difficult. When the children, Ted and Lauren lose power, Pat uses the generator to save the day.
110	4	"Pat's Special Delivery: Crazy Robots"	2 October 2008
Pat is asked to deliver two of Ted Glen's robots help Ben when the sorting machine malfunctions at the special delivery mail centre. But when the robots malfunction too, Pat has to figure out how to fix them.
111	5	"Pat's Special Delivery: Big Balloons"	3 October 2008
Pat is given the task of delivering helium balloons to the reverend Timms to celebrate the re-opening of Pencaster Town Hall. When the balloons are accidentally released, however, Pat has to make a daring rescue in his helicopter.
112	6	"Pat's Special Delivery: A Bouncy Castle"	6 October 2008
Pat is supposed to deliver a bouncy castle to Lauren's class at the school in Greendale. But when it accidentally inflates in the sorting office, the only way to deliver it is by using the Special Delivery helicopter.
113	7	"Pat's Special Delivery: Charlie's Telescope"	7 October 2008
Pat is tasked with delivering a telescope to Charlie in time for the appearance of a rare comet. However, Pat's new Sat Nav system proves to be less than helpful as he tries to make his delivery, and Pat is forced to find another way to deliver it to Charlie on time.
114	8	"Pat's Special Delivery: Fruit Bats"	8 October 2008
Pat is charged with delivering a family of fruit bats to Amy. When the bats escape, however, Pat is faced with the task of getting them back safely to Amy.
115	9	"Pat's Special Delivery: Precious Eggs"	9 October 2008
Pat is given a mission of delivering duck eggs to Amy at the surgery. However, when they are accidentally sold at the market, Pat must find a way to deliver them in time before they hatch.
116	10	"Pat's Special Delivery: Naughty Pumpkin"	10 October 2008
Pat needs to deliver Pumpkin the pony to Ben at the mail centre, where Lauren and Lizzie have arranged a surprise horse riding lesson. But when Pumpkin escapes, Pat must stop him from causing havoc at the market and bring him back in time for Ben.
117	11	"Pat's Special Delivery: A Movie Feast"	13 October 2008
Pat is tasked with delivering a film reel and a projector to Michael at the venue in Pencaster. However, when Pat loses the reel, he is tasked with finding it in time for the movie night.
118	12	"Pat's Special Delivery: A Speedy Car"	14 October 2008
Pat's mission is to delivery a remote control car for Bill at his birthday party. However, the parcels get mixed up and he accidentally delivers Ted Glen's television remote. Pat is then faced with chasing the car around Greendale when it is accidentally activated.
119	13	"Pat's Special Delivery: A Wobbly Piano"	15 October 2008
Pat is faced with the task of delivering a piano to the school in Greendale, for Lizzie, so that she can practice in time for her music concert. When his van breaks down, however, he needs help from Ted Glen to deliver it in time.
120	14	"Pat's Special Delivery: A Slippery Ice Cube"	16 October 2008
Pat is tasked with delivering a huge block of ice to Michael for the Chinese summer festival. But when the ice flies out of the van, Pat has to find a way to deliver it to Michael in time.
121	15	"Pat's Special Delivery: A Magical Jewel"	17 October 2008
Pat is asked to deliver an Indian elephant to the school for Meera's show and tell. But when a crafty magpie grabs the elephant's jewel, Pat must find a way to get the jewel back for Meera, in time for her show and tell.
122	16	"Pat's Special Delivery: A Teddy"	3 November 2008
Pat's task today is to deliver an extra special teddy bear that Meera has ordered for her little brother. Pat must deliver it in time for the teddy bear's picnic that afternoon.
123	17	"Pat's Special Delivery: A Super Magnet"	4 November 2008
Pat's mission is to use the Special Delivery helicopter equipped with a giant magnet to help shift a water tower that has fallen across the rail tracks.
124	18	"Pat's Special Delivery: A Treehouse"	5 November 2008
Pat is tasked with delivering a special new hibernation home to Amy, for Dora the door mouse. However, when Pat's delivery lands in a tree, Pat is faced with recovering the parcel for Amy and Dora.
125	19	"Pat's Special Delivery: Green Rabbit"	6 November 2008
Pat must deliver a green rabbit toy to baby Nikhil following the breakdown of the Pencaster flyer. Nikhil cannot sleep without his green rabbit toy, so Meera orders the new one that Pat must deliver.
126	20	"Pat's Special Delivery: A Surprise"	7 November 2008
Pat is given a special delivery to collect from Mrs. Goggins at Greendale Post Office. While he is collecting the delivery, Ben is organizing a surprise party for Pat to award him the Special Delivery Gold Star. But Ben finds himself short of time as Pat quickly progresses back to Pencaster, and so must rely on the help from some of his friends to delay Pat.
127	21	"Pat's Special Delivery: Bernie the Parrot"	10 November 2008
Pat's mission is to safely deliver Bernie the parrot to Amy at the surgery. However, when Sarah accidentally releases Bernie, Pat finds himself chasing Bernie all the way back to Pencaster, and making a daring rescue to recover Bernie safely.
128	22	"Pat's Special Delivery: The Red Rocket"	11 November 2008
Pat is asked to deliver Ted Glens new invention, the Red Rocket, to Ted in time for the Pencaster Flying Machine challenge. However, Pat soon finds himself behind the controls after some mischief from Alf Thompson's sheep, and, due to delays, has to enter the challenge in Ted's place.
129	23	"Pat's Special Delivery: A Disco Machine"	12 November 2008
Pat must save the day when the disco machine is damaged at the Greendale School. With the children looking forward to the school disco only hours away, it is a race against the clock for Pat.
130	24	"Pat's Special Delivery: A Giant Cake"	13 November 2008
Pat and the others organize a surprise party for Lucy Selby upon hearing that she is missing her father. Lucy has a big surprise when the special guest pops out of the giant cake.
131	25	"Pat's Special Delivery: Ice Skates"	14 November 2008
Pat is tasked with delivering some new ice skates to Meera on the snowiest day of the year. However, the snow falls so quickly that Pat gets trapped inside the Special Delivery sorting office with Jess and Ben.
132	26	"Pat's Special Delivery: The Flying Christmas Stocking"	19 December 2008
It is Christmas Eve and Pat uses the Special Delivery helicopter to collect a stocking full of secret Christmas presents that the children of Greendale school have made for the adults. However, the stocking rips mid-journey and the presents start falling out all over Greendale. Can Pat save the day?

=== Series 7: Special Delivery Service (2013) ===
This is the second season of Postman Pat: Special Delivery Service.

No. overall	No. in series	Title	Original release date
133	1	"Postman Pat and Cowboy Colin"	11 February 2013
A new Cowboy Colin story book has been published, and Pat has to deliver a copy of it to the school.
134	2	"Postman Pat and the Big Bob Bell"	12 February 2013
Pat has to deliver the newly restored Big Bob Bell back to the church in Greendale.
135	3	"Postman Pat and the Cheeky Sheep"	13 February 2013
Pat has to deliver a sheep to Amy, but it escapes and gets mixed up with other sheep.
136	4	"Postman Pat and the Metal Detector"	14 February 2013
Pat has to deliver a metal detector to Ted so that he can find his grandfather's medal.
137	5	"Postman Pat and the Crazy Crockery"	15 February 2013
It is Restaurant Night at the school, and Pat has to deliver the crockery, but the plates get broken because of the Yorkshire Pudding, so they do dances from all over the world, and the plates are good at the end.
138	6	"Postman Pat and the Runaway Bees"	18 February 2013
Pat has to deliver a bee hive to Thompson Ground.
139	7	"Postman Pat and the Identical Cats"	19 February 2013
Pat has to deliver Dr. Gilbertson's sister's cat, Bess, as part of the Special Delivery Service.
140	8	"Postman Pat and the Station Window"	20 February 2013
Pat has to deliver a new window for the railway station in Pencaster.
141	9	"Postman Pat and the Sculpture Trail"	21 February 2013
There is a sculpture trail in Greendale, and Pat has to collect all the entries and take them to the field where the event is taking place.
142	10	"Postman Pat and Meera's Gecko"	22 February 2013
Pat has to deliver George the gecko to Meera Bains.
143	11	"Postman Pat and the Booming Bagpipes"	11 March 2013
Pat has to deliver a set of bagpipes to Mrs. Goggins from her sister in Scotland.
144	12	"Postman Pat and the Scarecrow"	12 March 2013
Pat has to deliver a scarecrow to Thompson Ground in order to help Alf protect his crop of raspberries.
145	13	"Postman Pat and the Seaside Special"	13 March 2013
Pat and his family are getting ready for a Greendale Rocket trip to the Seaside.
146	14	"Postman Pat and the Chinese Dragon"	14 March 2013
It is Chinese Day at school, and the children are really looking forward to a day of special Chinese-themed celebration, helped by Michael.
147	15	"Postman Pat and the Karaoke Night"	15 March 2013
The children of Greendale have been practicing for Karaoke Night and cannot wait for it to be time to sing.
148	16	"Postman Pat and the Didgeridoo"	9 September 2013
Today, Pat's special delivery is an Australian didgeridoo for the school's music lesson.
149	17	"Postman Pat and the Amazing Weather Machine"	10 September 2013
Ajay is organizing a Summer Special day on the green, but the weather is too hot for everyone to enjoy themselves.
150	18	"Postman Pat and the Super Skateboard Sizzle"	11 September 2013
Ajay is holding a skateboard sizzle competition at the station in Greendale, and he is looking forward to taking part himself.
151	19	"Postman Pat and the Rubber Duck Race"	12 September 2013
It is the day of the annual Greendale to Pencaster Duck Race on the River Penn, and Pat is delivering the ducks.
152	20	"Postman Pat and the Sticky Situation"	13 September 2013
It is Alf Thompson's birthday and Dorothy has bought him a new quad bike.
153	21	"Postman Pat and the Tricky Tracker"	16 September 2013
Alf Thompson's pigeon Cedric is taking part in another race, and Pat has to deliver a tracking device to attach to the pigeon's leg.
154	22	"Postman Pat and the Greendale Ukulele Big Band"	17 September 2013
Pat has to deliver a box of ukuleles for the reverend Timms' big band.
155	23	"Postman Pat and the Tremendous Tree"	18 September 2013
Pat has to deliver a big tree to Thompson Ground, but can he get it there without harming an unforeseen bird's nest full of baby wagtails in its branches.
156	24	"Postman Pat and the Great Greendale Website"	19 September 2013
Pat is collecting donations for the school's new website of Greendale.
157	25	"Postman Pat and the Twinkly Lights"	1 November 2013
It is Diwali and Nisha is going to decorate the station with fairy lights which Pat has to deliver.
158	26	"Postman Pat and the Christmas Panto Horse"	20 December 2013
Lucy has a special song to sing at the pantomime, but when Pumpkin gets scared by the snow, Pat is in a race to get her back in time. Pumpkin is sheltering from the snow in the old post office, and only Pat's special delivery can make him leave.

=== Series 8: Special Delivery Service (2016–2017) ===
This is the third and final season of Postman Pat: Special Delivery Service.

No. overall	No. in series	Title	Original release date
159	1	"Postman Pat and the Cornish Caper"	21 November 2016
Pat and Jess set out to Cornwall to take delivery of a steam engine called "Old Betty".
160	2	"Postman Pat and the Giant Pumpkin"	22 November 2016
Everyone is decorating pumpkins, but Ted's giant pumpkin floats out to sea.
161	3	"Postman Pat and the Flying Shark"	23 November 2016
Pat and Jess must deliver an inflatable shark for Sealife Awareness Day at the school.
162	4	"Postman Pat and The Blue Flash"	24 November 2016
Pat needs to deliver a special delivery to the school today – the Blue Flash superhero.
163	5	"Postman Pat's Pancake Party"	25 November 2016
It is the Greendale Pancake Race. Pat has to deliver the pancake mix to the village.
164	6	"Postman Pat and the Runaway Remote"	28 November 2016
Pat has to deliver the remote for Charlie Pringle's new invention, but his special delivery seems to be causing problems for all the other mechanical items around.
165	7	"Postman Pat and the Zooming Zip wire"	29 November 2016
Pat has to deliver a zipwire to Greendale Crag for the children's hiking trip.
166	8	"Postman Pat and the Super Jet Boots"	30 November 2016
Pat has to deliver jet boots to the school, but Ajay takes them instead, mistaking them for his bird watching boots.
167	9	"Postman Pat and the Eco Igloo"	1 December 2016
Pat has to deliver blocks of ice to the school, so that the children can build an igloo for Greener Greendale Week.
168	10	"Postman Pat and the Painted Sheep"	2 December 2016
Pat has to deliver cans of sheep dye to Alf Thompson. Meanwhile, Julian, Meera and Bill are having a tour around the sorting office and soon have to help Pat with his special delivery.
169	11	"Postman Pat and the Spring Lamb"	16 January 2017
Pat has to deliver a yeti costume to the school and ends up delivering something even more special to the spring play.
170	12	"Postman Pat and the Reckless Rollers"	17 January 2017
Pat has to deliver new rollers to the garage.
171	13	"Postman Pat's Camping Chaos"	18 January 2017
Lauren and the school children go on a camping trip to Scotland, but they forget their tent and cooking equipment.
172	14	"Postman Pat and the King's Armour"	19 January 2017
Pat and Jess go to Wales to collect Jackie Gilbertson and her collection of ancestral items.
173	15	"Postman Pat and the Bouncing Bulb"	20 January 2017
Pat has to deliver a new light bulb to the lighthouse.
174	16	"Postman Pat and the Lost Pigeon"	23 January 2017
Cedric the homing pigeon is lost in Ireland. Pat and Jess have to fly out in the SDS plane, find Cerdic and bring him home.
175	17	"Postman Pat and the Runaway Bath"	24 January 2017
Pat has to deliver a parrot paradise bath tub for Micawber.
176	18	"Postman Pat and the Loch Ness Monster"	25 January 2017
Pat has to deliver a Loch Ness Monster locater to Mrs. Goggins.
177	19	"Postman Pat and the Clippy Claws"	26 January 2017
Micawber's claws need clipping, so Amy needs to come with Pat as he makes his special delivery.
178	20	"Postman Pat and the Sorting Machine"	27 January 2017
Pat has to go to Cardiff to get a new sorting machine.
179	21	"Postman Pat and the Stormy Birthday"	30 January 2017
It is Chris Beacon's birthday, but he cannot leave his post in the Lighthouse during a storm, so Pat must bring the birthday celebrations to him.
180	22	"Postman Pat and the Winter Games"	31 January 2017
Pat tries to deliver rubber rings to the kids for sledding, but his 4x4 gets stuck. Jess plays follow the leader with some sheep to help.
181	23	"Postman Pat and the Bucking Bronco"	1 February 2017
It is Wild West Day in Greendale and Pat has to deliver a bronco ride.
182	24	"Postman Pat's Pop Star Rescue"	2 February 2017
Pat has to bring the famous pop star, Brad Lee to his concert.
183	25	"Postman Pat and the Very Important Person"	3 February 2017
Pat has to collect the Duchess of Pencaster to present P.C. Selby with his award for Best Local Policeman of the Year.
184	26	"Postman Pat and the Space Suit"	29 March 2017
Pat has to bring an astronaut's suit to the Space Day at Ted's Mill.

== Specials (1990–2006) ==
No. in series	Title	Original release date
Special–1	"Postman Pat's ABC"	15 October 1990
Pat helps Tom Pottage learn his letters by making him a red ABC notebook.
Special–2	"Postman Pat's 123"	15 October 1990
Tom Pottage is now having trouble with his numbers from 1 to 10, so Pat helps him once again by making a blue 123 notebook.
Special–3	"Postman Pat Takes the Bus"	4 November 1991 (Home video); 25 December 1991 (Television)
Pat takes charge of his new post bus. But when he gets lost taking a group of passengers to Ingledale, he has to use his wits to get them all home early.
Special–4	"Postman Pat and the Toy Soldiers"	4 November 1991 (Home video); 2 January 1992 (Television)
There's a break-in at Garner Hall. By delivering the wrong parcel to Major Forbes, Pat manages to foil the thieves and become the hero of the day.
Special–5	"Postman Pat and the Tuba"	3 October 1994 (Home video); 29 May 1995 (Television)
While Pat is sorting out the junk in Granny Dryden's attic, he finds an old dusty tuba. He decides to play it at the village fete, but he's never played the tuba before and he doesn't have very long to practise…
Special–6	"Postman Pat and the Barometer"	3 October 1994 (Home video); 4 September 1995 (Television)
When Pat sees that his barometer is pointing to snow, he warns everyone he meets on his round, but nobody believes him as there's not a cloud in the sky.
Special–7	"Read Along With Postman Pat"	3 October 1994
One day, Pat tells the reverend Timms the story of how he could not sleep for a whole week. Another day, Pat also tells Peter Fogg how once three of his wishes nearly came true.
Special–8	"Postman Pat and the Greendale Rocket"	10 November 2003 (Home video); 6 September 2004 (Television)
The children set off on a school outing and are very excited when they discover Greendale's old forgotten steam train, the Greendale Rocket. Everyone volunteers to get the Greendale Rocket back into action. Pat and Ted try to get the engine working again. Will it work again in time for the grand reopening?
Special–9	"Postman Pat Clowns Around"	5 April 2004 (Home video); 13 September 2004 (Television)
The children are disappointed when the circus has to cancel its visit to Greendale, due to ill performers, so the villagers prepare to put on their very own circus.
Special–10	"Postman Pat and the Pirate Treasure"	20 September 2004
Pat's cousin Matt arrives from America. He owns his own boat, so Pat and Julian sail with him to a small island. Can they find the Greendale cup, which Matt buried as a boy, in time for the annual flower show?
Special–11	"Postman Pat's Magic Christmas"	10 November 2003 (Home video); 24 December 2004 (Television)
It's Christmas time in Greendale, and everyone is excited—everyone except Julian who is wishing for snow.
Special–12	"Postman Pat's Great Big Party"	2 October 2006 (Home video exclusive)
Everyone in Greendale is helping to arrange a surprise party for Pat. The preparations are underway with kids, adults and even Ted's machines helping out. But all the while, Pat thinks his friends and family have forgotten his special day. Will everything go to plan and be ready in time for the big surprise?
