= Mondial Relay =

French postal service company

Mondial Relay by Inpost
- Founded: 1997; 29 years ago
- Area served: France,Benelux (Belgium , the Netherlands , Luxembourg )
- Key people: David Lewkowitz,CEO
- Revenue: 575,271,200 euro (2022)
- Net income: 27,970,000 euro (2020)
- Number of employees: 2500 (2026)
- Parent: InPost
- Website: www.mondialrelay.com

Mondial Relay was created in 1997 in France as the parcel delivery division of 3SI Group (formerly 3 Suisses International). The group was jointly owned by the Mulliez family and the Otto Group. In September 2013, the Otto Group increased its stake in 3SI from 51% to 100%. In July 2021, the Polish logistics company InPost acquired Mondial Relay from the Otto Group for €513 million. The term « Point Relais » in its commercial graphic form was a registered trademark belonging to Mondial Relay.

== History ==
The pick-up point delivery service was created on April 15, 1992.

Until 2018, Mondial Relay only handled small parcels up to 30 kg. That year, the company began delivering heavier items between 30 and 150 kg which customers can pick up at dedicated collection points called 'drives'.

In 2020, the company employed nearly 1,000 people. It operated 28 distribution centers and five sorting hubs: three in France, one in Belgium, and one in Spain. The company worked with over 1,000 transport partners and delivered 140 million parcels. By March 2021, its network included more than 13,000 Points Relais pickup locations in France and 40,000 across Europe. In 2021, Otto Group sold Mondial Relay for €565 million to InPost, a Polish package delivery company. The new owners have continued to operate the service using the same name.

Point de retrait de colis Mondial Relay (Lidl Vichy Bartins) 2025-12-14

In 2024, Mondial Relay became an official partner and the official relay provider for the Tour de France starting flag.

In 2025, the company scaled back its network of partner pickup points, cutting 3,500 of its 11,000 locations. The move reflected a broader shift toward parcel lockers and automated collection machines.

As of 2026, Mondial Relay runs about 19,000 pickup and drop-off points in France. This includes over 12,000 automated lockers and around 6,000 partner shops Points Relais® .Shopkeepers handle the parcels at the retail stores. At the lockers, customers drop off and pick up packages themselves.
