= Slipper =

Informal footwear

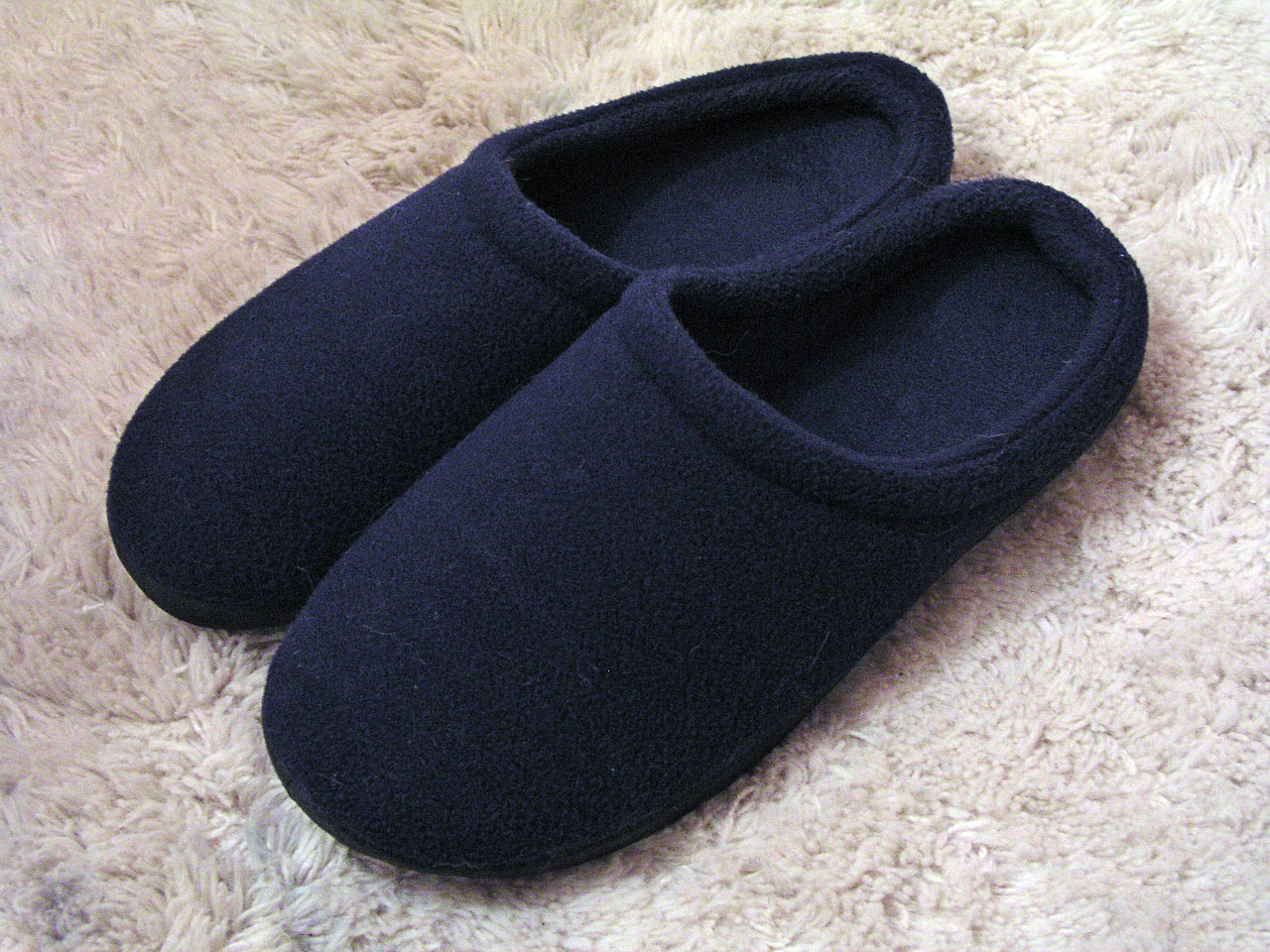
Open-heeled slippers

Slippers are a type of shoes falling under the broader category of light footwear, that are easy to put on and off and are intended to be worn indoors, particularly at home. They provide comfort and protection for the feet when walking indoors.

== History ==
The recorded history of slippers goes back to antiquity. In English-language usage, the word slipper dates from at least c. 1478 as sclyppers. English-speakers formerly also used the related terms pantofles (from the French word pantoufle), or slip-shoes/slipshoes.

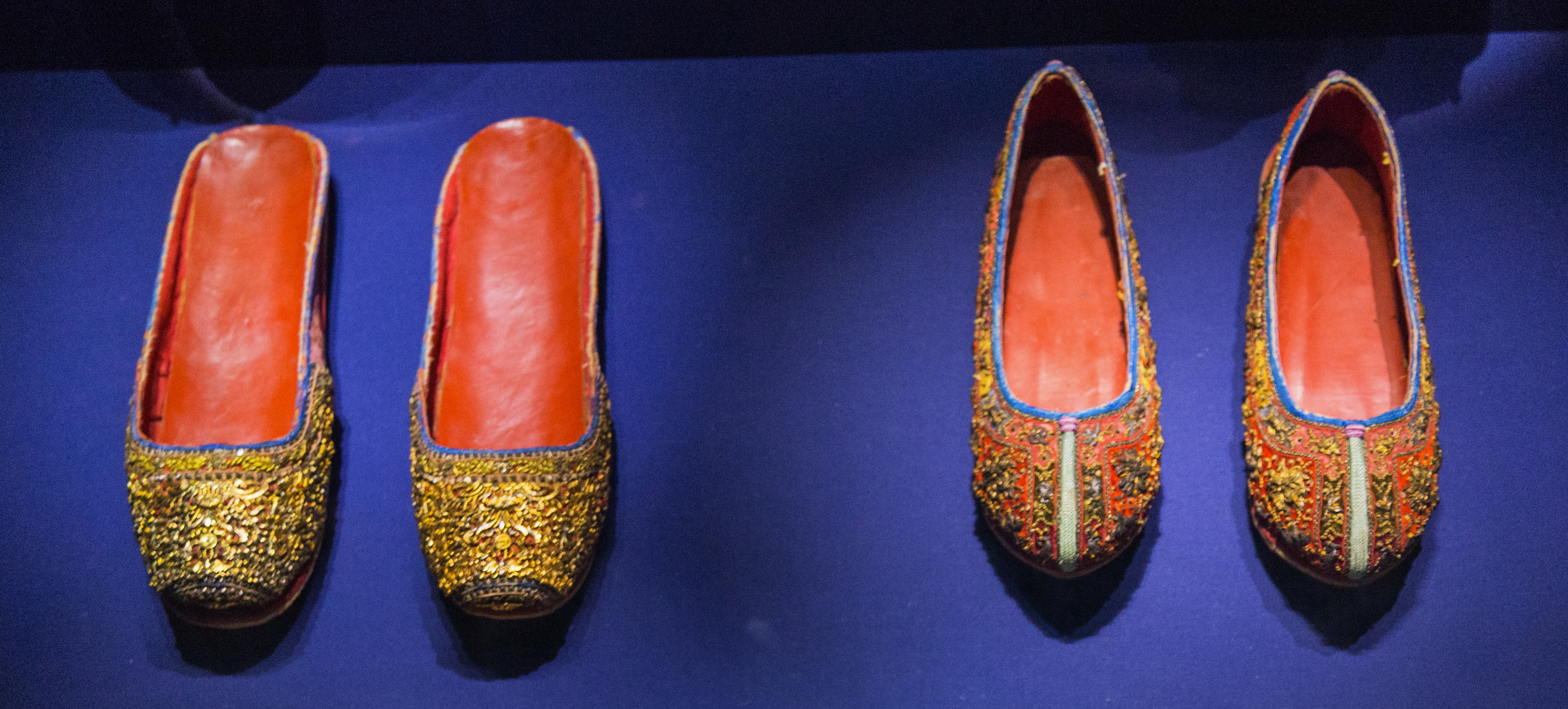
Peranakan Chinese wedding slippers from the late-19th century

Slippers in China date from 4700 BC; they were made of cotton or woven rush, had leather linings, and featured symbols of power, such as dragons.

Native Americans wore highly decorative moccasins. Such moccasins depicted nature scenes and were embellished with beadwork and fringing; their soft sure-footedness made them suitable for indoor use. Inuit and Aleut people made shoes from smoked hare-hide to protect their feet against the frozen ground inside their homes.

Fashionable Orientalism saw the introduction into the West of designs like the baboosh.

Victorian people needed such shoes to keep dust and gravel outside their homes. For Victorian ladies, slippers gave an opportunity to show off their needlepoint skills and to use embroidery as decoration.

== Types ==
Types of slippers include:

- Open-heel slippers – usually made with a fabric upper layer that encloses the top of the foot and the toes, but leaves the heel open. These are often distributed in expensive hotels, included with the cost of the room.
- Closed slippers – slippers with a heel guard that prevents the foot from sliding out.
- Slipper boots – slippers meant to look like boots. Often favored by women, they are typically furry boots with a fleece or soft lining, and a soft rubber sole. Modeled after sheepskin boots, they may be worn outside.
- Sandal slippers – cushioned sandals with soft rubber or fabric soles, similar to Birkenstock's cushioned sandals.
- Evening slipper, also known as the "Prince Albert" slipper in reference to Albert, Prince Consort. It is made of velvet with leather soles and features a grosgrain bow or the wearer’s initials embroidered in gold.

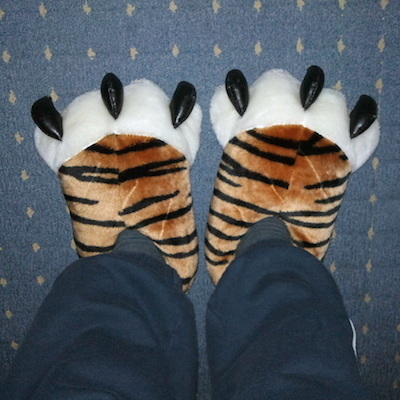
Novelty animal-feet slippers

Some slippers are made to resemble something other than a slipper and are sold as a novelty item. They are usually made of soft and colorful materials and may come in the shapes of animals, animal paws, vehicles, cartoon characters, bunny slippers, and so on.

Not all shoes with a soft, fluffy interior are slippers. Any shoe with a rubber sole and laces is a normal outdoor shoe. In India, rubber chappals (flip-flops) are worn as indoor shoes.

== In popular culture ==
The fictional character Cinderella is said to have worn glass slippers; in modern parlance, they would probably be called glass high heels. This motif was introduced in Charles Perrault's 1697 version of the fairy tale, "Cendrillon ou la petite pantoufle de verre" ("Cinderella, or the Little Glass Slipper"). For some years it was debated that this detail was a mistranslation and that the slippers in the story were instead made of fur (French: vair), but this interpretation has since been discredited by folklorists.

A pair of ruby slippers worn by Judy Garland in The Wizard of Oz sold at Christie's in June 1988 for $165,000. The same pair was resold on May 24, 2000, for $666,000. On both occasions, they were the most expensive shoes from a film to be sold at auction.

In Hawaii and many islands of the Caribbean, the term slippers, or slippahs, is used to describe flip-flops.

The term "house shoes" is common in the American South.

== See also ==
- Slide
- Bunny slippers
- List of shoe styles
- Lady's slipper orchids
- Ruby slippers
- Slip-on shoe
- Slippering (punishment)
- Uwabaki
