= Rafał Brzoska =

Polish businessman (born 1977)

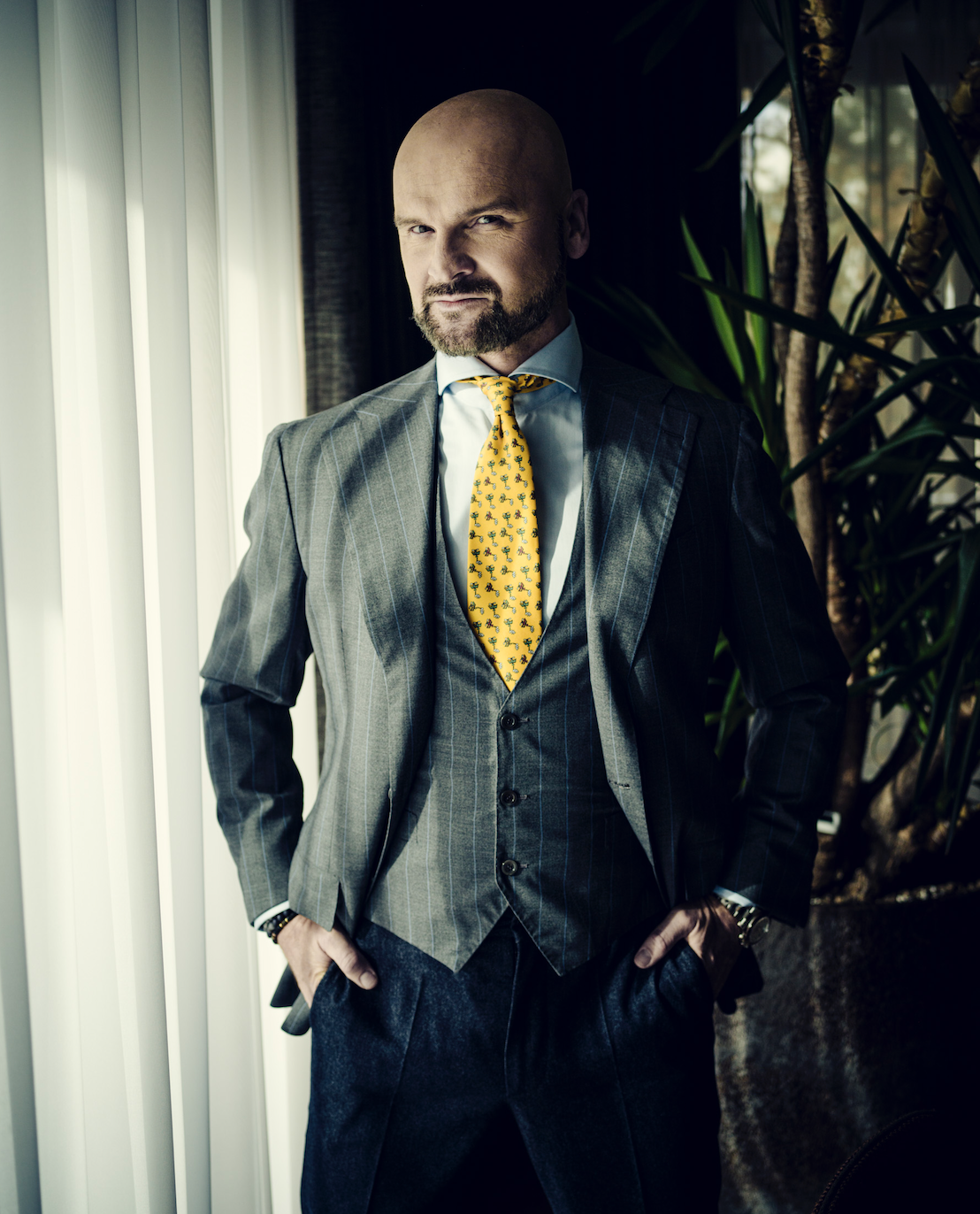
- Brzoska in March 2025
- Born: 13 November 1977 (age 48); Racibórz, Poland
- Education: Kraków University of Economics
- Occupations: Entrepreneur; Investor
- Years active: 1999–present
- Known for: Founder of InPost, creator of the Paczkomat postal service
- Spouse: Omenaa Mensah (m. 2019)
- Children: 3

Rafał Brzoska (born 13 November 1977) is a Polish entrepreneur, investor and economist. He is the founder and President of the Management Board of InPost S.A.

== Life and career ==
Brzoska attended Jan Kasprowicz High School in Racibórz, Poland and later the Kraków University of Economics.

During his third year at university, he founded Integer, initially a website design business, with capital of 20,000 złoty ($5,000 as of 1999). After several money-losing months, the company switched to distributing leaflets and became successful. In 2006, he founded InPost and created a network of self-serviced parcel lockers known as Paczkomaty.

In 2012, he appeared on a list of the richest Poles, and in 2015 was ranked the 68th on Forbes' "List of the 100 richest Poles 2015."

In 2019, Brzoska married the Polish journalist and television personality Omenaa Mensah. They have one son, Vincent, who was born in 2017. Brzoska has two daughters from a previous relationship.

In 2021, Brzoska's net worth was estimated at 5 billion złoty (1.3 billion USD).

In 2023, he was awarded the Knight's Cross of the Order of Polonia Restituta by President Andrzej Duda at the Belweder Palace for his "outstanding contributions to the development of Polish economy as well as his social and charity activism".

== See also ==
- List of Polish businesspeople
