= Omenaa Mensah =

Polish TV presenter and philanthropist (born 1979)

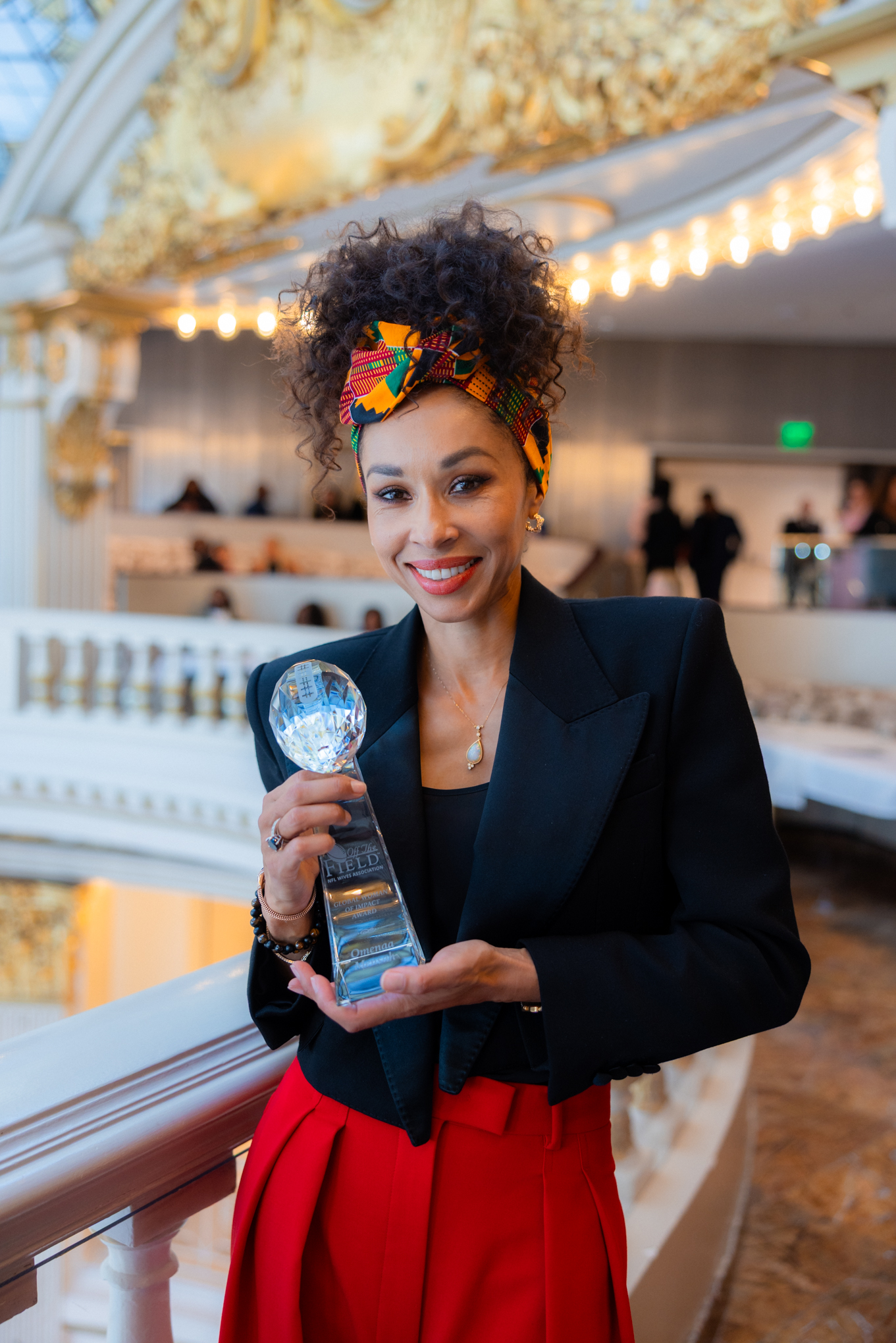
- Omenaa Mensah (2026)
- Born: 26 July 1979 (age 47); Jelenia Góra, Poland
- Citizenship: Polish and Ghanaian
- Education: Poznań University of Economics
- Occupations: Weather presenter Television presenter Economist
- Spouse: Rafał Brzoska (m. 2019)
- Website: omenaa.com

Omenaa Mensah (born 26 July 1979) is a Polish philanthropist, entrepreneur, investor, journalist, presenter, and art collector.

== Education ==
She graduated from primary school in Swarzędz and the Economic and Social High School in Poznań. For five years, she played basketball and belonged to the Union of Swarzędz. She studied "Management and Marketing” at the University of Management and Banking in Poznań. In 2001-2004, she studied international relations (specialization: “European Studies”) at the Poznań University of Economics, where in 2005, she defended her master's thesis. She is a PhD student at the SGH Warsaw School of Economics with an economic and social profile. Her scientific interests concern sub-Saharan Africa.

== Career highlights ==
During her studies, she founded the Omi Hair company, which is engaged in offering the public African hairstyles. She also earned her money as a model, working both in Poland and in Europe.

In 2003, she started working at TVN 7, in which she ran the erotic interactive program Red Light. Since 2003, she has been a weather presenter in the TVN Group; she also runs programs on its channels on the topics of travel, sports, culinary and lifestyle. In 2008, together with her daughter Vanessa, she ran the TVN Style: Kitchen cooking program - open 24 hours a day. In 2014–2016, she ran the Domo+: Star Houses program, in which she visited Polish media personalities in their apartments and homes. In 2019, she ran the program Domo+ Luxury Houses with Omena. In 2020, she was involved in the production of the original program Exceptional Houses, which was broadcast on the TVN Style and TVN channels.

In 2007, in conjunction with Rafał Maserak, she participated in the fifth edition of the entertainment program: Dancing with the Stars. In autumn 2017, she was the captain of the winning team in the final of the third edition of TVN’s Mali Giganci.

In 2012, she launched "Ammadora”, a custom-made art-inspired furniture company. In 2018, she launched the "Occhiello" brand, specializing in tailor-made men's suits, and in 2020, she expanded to include the “Amante” brand. She is also a partner, among others, in: "RiO Asi", "Omi Productions", "Omiimage", "InHome Real Estate", "O&R Holding", "ubramypracowników.pl", and "FoodWell".

== Philanthropic activities ==
In May 2014, she founded the "Omenaa Foundation", of which she is the President. In April 2017, at the initiative of the Foundation, the construction of a school for Ghanaian children, in Tema, Ghana, began. In 2026, her international philanthropic activity and Polish-Ghanaian background were profiled by Forbes. Funds for this investment, as well as for other charitable activities of the foundation, are collected using tailor-made CSR projects and a number of projects with the involvement of Polish stars. She was also involved in the development of the education of Polish children from children's homes, organizing an action aimed at transferring the computer equipment necessary for remote learning for the occupants of children's homes during the COVID-19 pandemic. As part of the foundation, she also works to promote tolerance, acceptance and respect for other people. She is the initiator and producer of the charity performance: Czarno to widzę, czyli wymieszani, posortowani [Odds are not good, i.e. mixed, sorted], whose premiere took place in January 2020. In 2022, she became the vice-president of the "Rafał Brzoska Foundation", the goal of which is to provide financial and mentoring support for young talented people from poor rural areas.

In 2022, together with Rafał Brzoska, they organized "Convoys of Polish Hearts", the largest private transports of humanitarian aid for the civilian population in war-torn Ukraine. In April 2022, an ambulance and several trucks with basic necessities were sent to the hospital in Rivne, and at the end of the month, 34 train car wagons filled with, among other items, food, medicines and hygiene products, went to Kharkiv. Logistics was organized in cooperation with the Government Agency for Strategic Reserves. Omenaa Mensah and Rafał Brzoska also created the "RiO Edu Centrum" in Warsaw, the aim of which is to support women and children fleeing the war in building a new life away from home, in a different environment and culture. The Centre provides day legal care, medical and professional activation, intensive Polish language learning and care for pre-school children.

=== TOP CHARITY ===
Alongside her husband, Rafał Brzoska, she co-founded the "Top Charity" Grand Auction. During these annual events, funds raised from donors and participants are personally matched by Brzoska.

The amounts raised from previous auctions are:

Auction date	Amount raised from donors	Rafał Brzoska	Total auction amount PLN
30 May 2026	10 million euros in 90 minutes	10 million euros	over 85 million PLN
7 June 2025	over 14 million euros	14 million euros	over 60,000,000 PLN
8 June 2024	over 11 million euros	11 million euros	45,917,000 PLN
3 June 2023	over 6.5 million euros	6.5 million euros	28,372,000 PLN
22 May 2022	over 2 million euros	2 million euros	

- 30% of the funds raised through Top Charity go to the Philanthropic Consortium, which every year supports the implementation of projects by various foundations.

== Personal life ==
She is the daughter of a Polish mother (Izabella) and a Ghanaian father (Opoku). Her mother completed her studies in the field of "Environmental protection" at the Wrocław University of Technology, and her father is a cardiothoracic surgeon who has worked actively in Poland and around the world. She has two children, her daughter: Vanessa (b. 2002) of her first relationship, and her son: Vincent (b. 2017), whose father is Rafał Brzoska. The couple's wedding took place in 2019.

She is fond of art, design and architecture, in particular, sculpture and spatial figures. In an interview for Well.pl in 2021, she revealed that she is running a large international project related to architecture, art and design.

In an interview conducted in 2021 for Onet.pl, she revealed that she is an atheist.

== Awards and recognition ==
Year	Awards and recognition	Award
2026	Global Woman of Impact Award	for charitable activities.The first time in the history of these awards that it was presented to a person from outside the USA.
2025	Woman of the Year 2025	for social activity; award presented by Forbes.
2025	Winner of the Businesswoman of the Year 2025	for social activity; award presented by Puls Biznesu
2024	Kotler Awards Poland	joint award with Rafałem Brzoską in the category "Excellence in Entrepreneurship".
2023	Złote Spinacze (Golden Clips)	joint award with Rafałem Brzoską for aid Ukraine.
2022	Bronze BohaterON in the "Teacher" category	joint award with Rafałem Brzoską for commitment to philanthropic activities
2021	Plejada Super Star	for charitable activities
2020	"100 Women in Business" plebiscite organized by Puls Biznesu	second place in the category "Businesswoman 2020 – Social Activity”
2020	"Stars of Charity" plebiscite"	Honorary Star of Charity
