= Yodel (company) =

British delivery service company

Yodel Delivery Network Limited
- Formerly: Home Delivery Network Limited
- Type: Private
- Industry: Logistics services
- Founded: May 2008 as Home Delivery Network Ltd
- Defunct: July 17, 2026
- Fate: Merged with InPost
- Successor: InPost
- Headquarters: Liverpool, England, UK
- Key people: Mike Hancox (CEO, July 2019 – April 2025)
- Owner: InPost
- Parent: Judge Logistics
- Website: yodel.co.uk

Yodel was a delivery service company based in Liverpool, England. It was originally known as the Home Delivery Network (HDN, full name Home Delivery Network Limited, HDNL), until it acquired the business-to-business (B2B) and retail (B2C) operations of DHL Express UK and thereafter, rebranded itself as Yodel in May 2010. Previously privately owned by the billionaire brothers David and Frederick Barclay, it was acquired by Jacob Corlett, founder of tech logistics firm Shift in February 2024 through holding company YDLGP Ltd and later transferred to another holding company Judge Logistics Ltd, which in turn was announced to have been acquired by InPost in April 2025.

The Yodel brand ceased trading permanently on 17 July 2026 and all its operations moved under the InPost brand.

== History ==
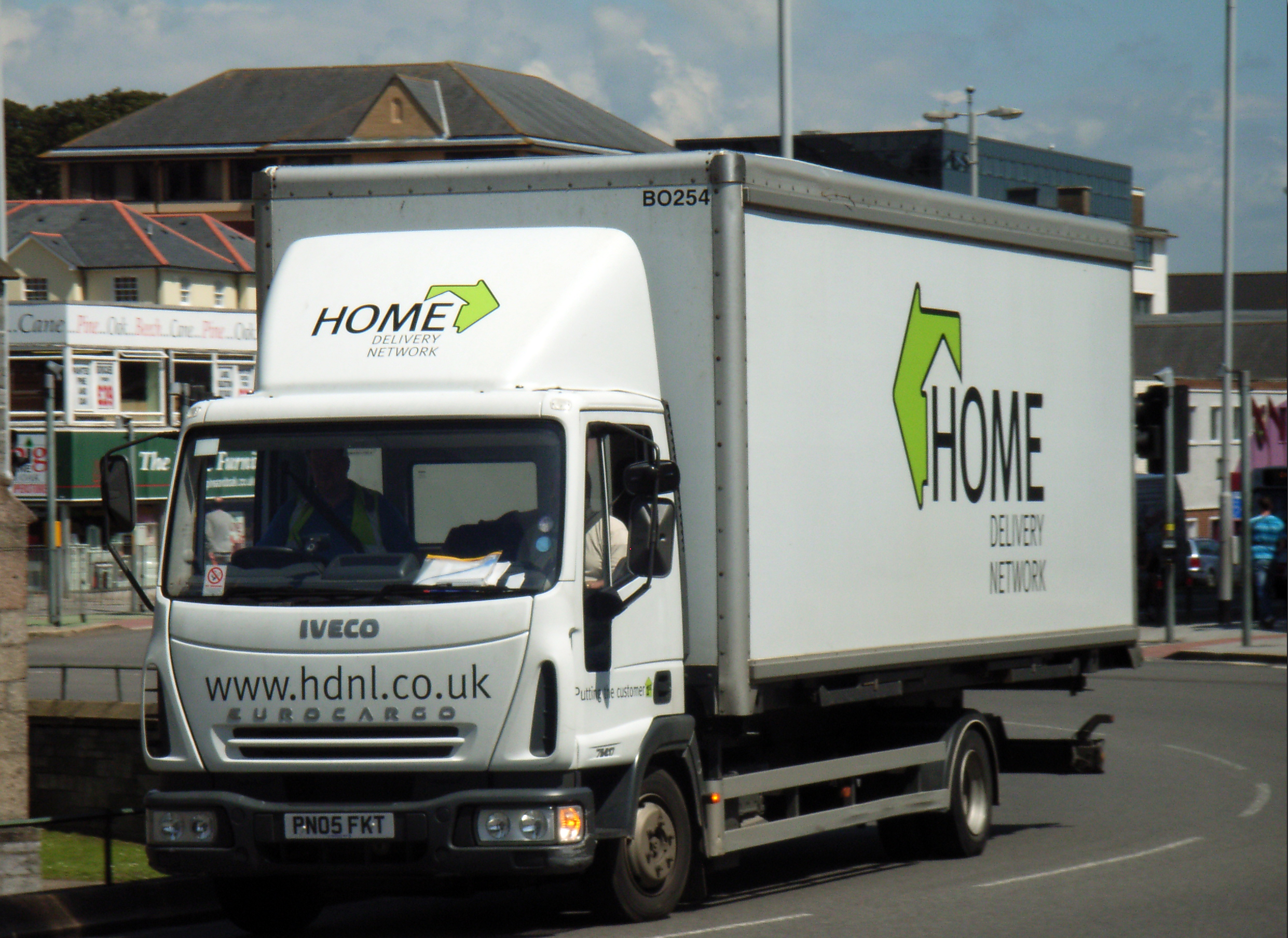
A Home Delivery Network lorry

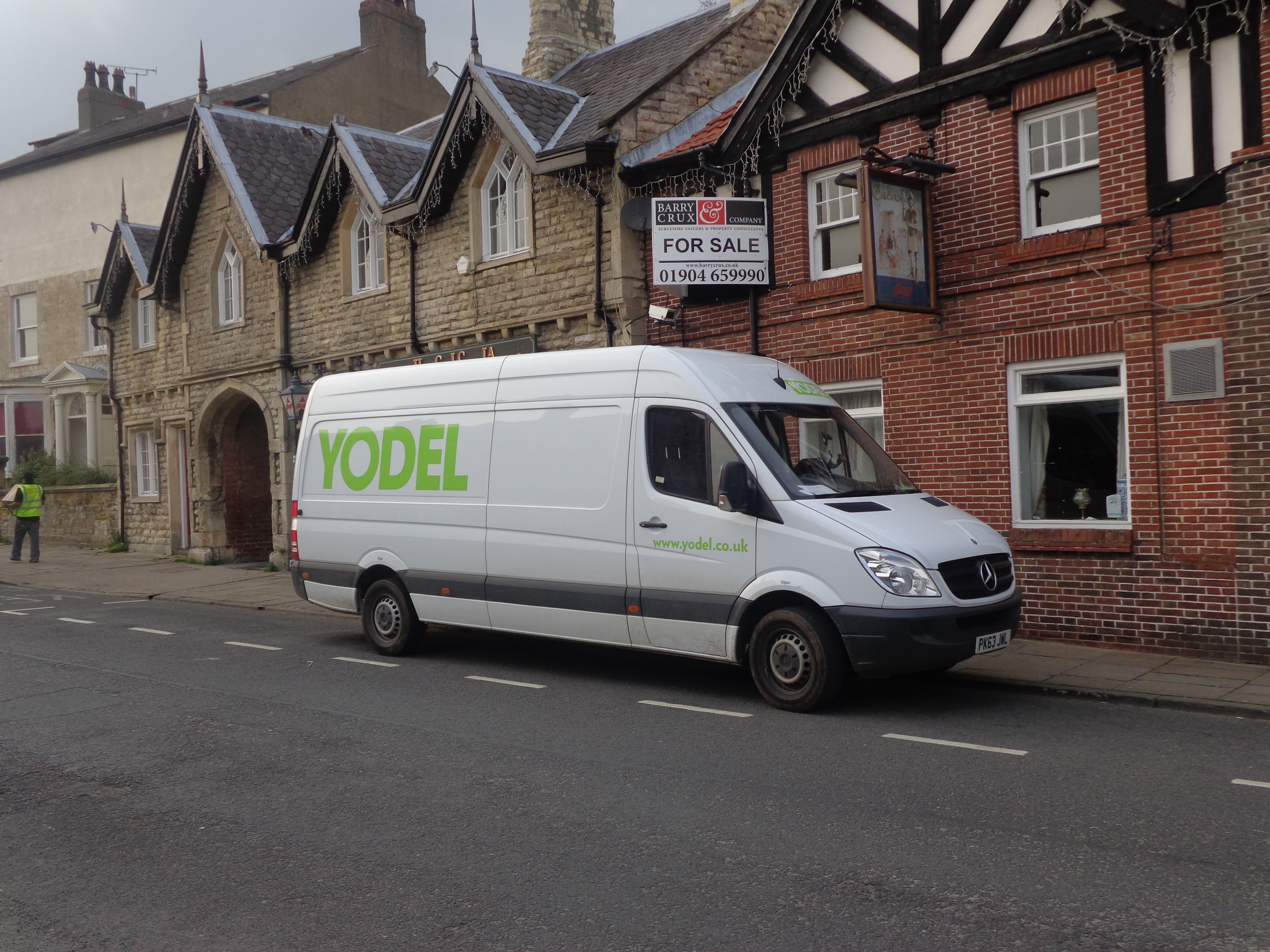
A Yodel delivery van in Tadcaster, North Yorkshire

Home Delivery Network operated as the logistics division of The Very Group, until it demerged in June 2008. It was formed by the merger of Business Express and Reality, the former Littlewoods and Shop Direct delivery companies respectively. Yodel has distribution hubs in Hertfordshire and the West Midlands, and over 45 delivery depots across the UK.

In December 2011, the London Evening Standard carried a story on reports of packages from Yodel being lost or not delivered on time for Christmas. Yodel said that there had been a great increase in December deliveries over the previous two years and that Yodel had delivered over twenty million packages that month, with 999 out of 1000 being delivered on time.

In March 2012, the BBC's Watchdog consumer programme broadcast a segment highly critical of Yodel. In January 2014, Yodel was voted as the worst delivery service in the United Kingdom for the second consecutive year. BBC Watchdog has stated that it continued to regularly receive reports of bad service after the rebranding to Yodel.

In January 2014, Yodel was named the "worst parcel delivery firm" in a poll by MoneySavingExpert.com, of 9,000 people, with 78% of customers rating their experience negatively. Despite this, Yodel continues to be the delivery company of choice for many major retailers in the United Kingdom, largely due to the company's low prices.

The company apologised in November 2015, after one of the firm's couriers had left a parcel on the roof of a customer's home. In February 2016, Yodel was featured in a Dispatches investigation, which aired on Channel 4. The investigation was entitled Where's My Missing Mail?. The programme sent an undercover reporter to work at Yodel’s Shaw depot as a sorter. The investigation highlighted how parcels had been thrown onto conveyor belts and even thrown between staff members.

In June 2023, in order to reduce the environmental impact of its delivery operations, Yodel invested £14.5m on its fleet, consisting of 45 new DAF XF 450 tractor units and 120 new solar powered double-decker trailers.

In February 2024, Yodel was saved from collapse by being taken over by YDLGP, a new company supported by Solano Partners and rival logistics firm Shift. The consortium had been talking to Yodel since mid 2023.

In May 2024, Yodel announced the proposal to close the Shaw national distribution hub. Following a consultation period, the site officially closed in July 2024.

In April 2025, Yodel's parent company, Judge Logistics, was acquired by Polish logistics firm InPost for £106 million. InPost is set to replace the Yodel brand with its own.

== Ownership dispute ==
A legal dispute emerged in 2025 over the ownership of Yodel, following its acquisition by InPost. Multiple parties—including Jacob Corlett (Yodel’s former chairman, acting through Corja Holdings), Shift Global Holdings, and over 70 other claimants—asserted that they lawfully exercised warrants entitling them to more than 75% of Yodel’s share capital. A High Court injunction in May 2025 prevented completion of the InPost transaction pending resolution of these claims. The claims were ultimately unsuccessful, with the court ruling in December 2025 that "the signatures on the documents in dispute were suspicious, showed many signs of forgery, and probably were forged".

== Collect+ ==
In February 2011, Collect+ a parcel sending and collection service, was launched as a joint venture between PayPoint and Yodel. This service is available through almost 6,000 of the PayPoint retail network in the UK and allows customers to collect and send packages at their local convenience store. In April 2020, PayPoint announced an agreement with Yodel to take full ownership of Collect+.
