= 2009 in South African television =

This is a list of South African television related events from 2009.

== Events ==
- 10 May - Sasha-Lee Davis and Jason Hartman win the fifth season of Idols South Africa. An error in the SMS-based voting process led the producers to declare the two co-winners.
- 12 November - 19-year-old deaf hip-hop dancer Darren Rajbal wins the first season of SA's Got Talent.

== Debuts ==
=== Domestic ===
- 1 February - The Big Debate (e.tv) (2009–present)
- 7 April - Getroud met rugby (KykNet) (2009–present)
- 16 September - Superdance South Africa (e.tv) (2009–present)
- 1 October - SA's Got Talent (SABC2) (2009–present)
- 5 December - Bun&Bunee (SABC3) (2009–2011)

=== International ===
- 5 January - (United Kingdom) The Likeaballs (e.tv)
- 8 January - (United States) Fringe (M-Net)
- 4 February - (United States) Generation Kill (M-Net)
- 8 February - (United Kingdom) Secret Diary of a Call Girl (M-Net)
- 19 February - (Canada) Sanctuary (M-Net Action)
- 5 April - (United States) Home Free (SABC3)
- 26 May - United States of Tara (M-Net)
- 5 September - (Canada) Heartland (SABC2)
- 4 October - (United States) Glee (M-Net)
- 6 October - (Australia) Bed of Roses (M-Net Series)
- 9 November - (United States) Hawthorne (M-Net)
- 17 December - (Canada) Durham County (M-Net)
- (United Kingdom) The Pinky and Perky Show (M-Net)
- (United Kingdom) Postman Pat Special Delivery Service (M-Net)
- (United Kingdom) / (United States) The Mr. Men Show (M-Net)
- (United Kingdom) Frankenstein's Cat (M-Net)
- (Canada) / (Australia) / (United Kingdom) Pixel Pinkie (M-Net)
- (United States) The Good Wife (M-Net)
- (United Kingdom) Noddy in Toyland (M-Net)
- (United Kingdom) / (United States) House of Saddam (M-Net)
- (United States) 3-2-1 Penguins! (SABC2)
- (Australia) Rush (M-Net)

=== Changes of network affiliation ===
Shows	Moved from	Moved to
(United Kingdom) Bump	SABC2	e.tv
(United States) / (France) Dennis the Menace	SABC2	e.tv
(United Kingdom) Teddy Trucks	SABC2	e.tv
(United Kingdom) Paddington	K-T.V. World	e.tv
(United States) Adventures of Sonic the Hedgehog	Bop TV	e.tv
(Canada) / (France) / (United States) Heathcliff	M-Net	e.tv
(United States) Invasion	M-Net	SABC2
(United States) South Park	M-Net	Vuzu
(United States) My Boys	Go	Vuzu

== Television shows ==
=== 1980s ===
- Good Morning South Africa (1985–present)
- Carte Blanche (1988–present)

=== 1990s ===
- Top Billing (1992–present)
- Generations (1994–present)
- Isidingo (1998–present)

=== 2000s ===
- Idols South Africa (2002–present)
- Rhythm City (2007–present)

== New channels ==
- February - MYtv

== See also ==
- 2009 in South Africa
