= The Adventures of Paddington =

The Adventures of Paddington may refer to:

- Paddington (TV series), a 1975 BBC children's series retitled to The Adventures of Paddington in 1978
- The Adventures of Paddington Bear, a 1997 Canadian/French animated children's television series
- The Adventures of Paddington (2019 TV series), a series for Nick Jr.
