= Nkabinde =

Nkabinde is a South African surname. Notable people with the surname include:

- Bess Nkabinde (born 1959), South African judge
- Gwen Mahlangu-Nkabinde (born 1955), South African politician
- Mahlathini (Simon Nkabinde; 1938–1999), South African mbaqanga singer
- Nkunzi Nkabinde (1975–2018), South African sangoma, author, and LGBT activist
- Themba Nkabinde (born 1956), South African Army General
