= The Wombles (1997 TV series) =

Children's animation series, 1997–1998

- Genre: Children’s animation
- Created by: Elisabeth Beresford
- Written by: Kath Yelland; John Ellis; Joseph Mallozzi; Adrian Besley; Peter Hynes; Stan Cullimore; Alastair Swinnerton; Andy Ellis; Julie Middleton; Jennifer Lupinacci; Mark Torrender; Brian Jordan; Paul Brophy
- Directed by: John Ellis
- Voices of: Victor Knight; Terrence Scammell; Rick Jones; Simon Peacock; Michael Hancock; Sonja Ball; Michael Lamport; Daniel Brochu; Julie Burroughs; Julian Casey; Gregory Calpakis; Emma Campbell; Luis de Cespedes; Nancy Helms
- Theme music composer: Mike Batt
- Countries of origin: Canada; United Kingdom
- No. of series: 3
- No. of episodes: 52 (list of episodes)

Production
- Executive producers: Micheline Charest; Ronald A. Weinberg; David Ferguson; Dan Maddicott
- Producer: Cassandra Schafhausen
- Cinematography: Mark Bond
- Editor: Andi Sloss
- Running time: 10 minutes
- Production companies: CINAR Films; CINAR Europe; United Film & Television Productions; FilmFair Limited; HTV Wales

Original release
- Network: ITV (CITV strand)
- Release: 5 March 1997 – 10 November 1998

Related
- The Wombles

The Wombles is an animated series for children transmitted in 1997 and 1998, based on the 1973 series created by Elisabeth Beresford. The Wombles had remained popular with children into the 1980s. After FilmFair was acquired by the Canadian company CINAR Films in 1996, a new series of episodes was made, with three new Womble characters. The series is a co-production between CINAR Films and United Film & Television Productions/HTV Wales, in association with FilmFair Limited and ITV. 52 episodes were produced.
