= FilmFair =

American/British animation studio, 1959–2002

FilmFair Communications Filmfair Animation
- Industry: Television production Film
- Founded: 1959; 67 years ago (as FilmFair); 1968; 58 years ago (as FilmFair London)
- Defunct: 2002; 24 years ago (FilmFair London)
- Fate: FilmFair: Folded into Altschul Group Corporation; FilmFair London: Folded into CINAR
- Successor: Altschul Group Corporation; Cookie Jar Group
- Headquarters: Los Angeles, California, U.S. London, England
- Key people: Gus Jekel; Graham Clutterbuck; Ivor Wood
- Parent: Central Independent Television (early 1980s–1991); Caspian Group (1991–1996); CINAR (FilmFair London, 1996–2002)

FilmFair was an American/British animation studio and production company that produced children's television series, animated television series, educational films, and television advertisements. The company made numerous stop motion films using puppets, clay animation, and cutout animation.

== History ==
=== Foundation ===
FilmFair was founded in 1959 by American animator Gus Jekel in Los Angeles, California. After working with Walt Disney Productions and other Hollywood animation studios in the 1930s, Jekel incorporated FilmFair because he wanted the freedom to create live action work as well. The studio was in Animation Alley, a stretch of Cahuenga Boulevard that runs through Studio City in northern Los Angeles.

Jekel's company produced television advertisements—some animated, others live action—and was extremely successful; even Disney was a client.

In the late 1960s, Jekel asked an English colleague, Graham Clutterbuck, to start a European office for FilmFair. Clutterbuck had been producing and coordinating television ads for European advertising agencies and had just lost his job as director general of Les Cinéastes Associés in Paris. Although he was not well-acquainted with animation, Clutterbuck accepted the job offer. Clutterbuck established FilmFair's European office in Paris. It was there that he met Serge Danot, who pitched his ideas for a children's series, but Clutterbuck turned him down. Soon after, Danot signed a contract with the BBC to produce the series The Magic Roundabout. He invited Clutterbuck to watch them film. While there, Clutterbuck met the series' co-creator, Ivor Wood. Later, the two men agreed that Wood would make animated films for FilmFair. The success of The Magic Roundabout paved the way for more stop-motion animation at the BBC. Soon, Wood came up with the idea for The Herbs, which premiered on BBC1 in 1968.

=== FilmFair London ===
By this time, Beatlemania had made England a cultural hotspot. Clutterbuck found it too difficult to attract English talent to France, so he moved the office to London. There, Barry Leith joined the company as director of animation. Wood and Leith collaborated on The Wombles, but Wood also had a few ideas for animating Michael Bond's stories about Paddington Bear. Bond was enthusiastic about Wood's artistic vision and began scripting the first series. BBC1 premiered Paddington in 1976 to great acclaim. FilmFair produced new episodes of the programme for three years, and it expanded into a considerable media franchise.

FilmFair continued to produce successful stop motion programmes through the mid-1970s. The company's first classically animated series, Simon in the Land of Chalk Drawings, premiered in 1974 on ITV. It was adapted from a series of children's books written and illustrated by Edward McLachlan. The company's first series not directed by Wood was The Perishers, a classically animated series directed by Dick Horn.

As FilmFair London continued to produce animated television series for the BBC and ITV, they eventually reached an international audience through broadcast syndication and home video distribution.

=== Acquisitions ===
In the early 1980s, Central Independent Television bought a controlling share of the European branch of FilmFair. Graham Clutterbuck died of cancer on 30 April 1988; FilmFair dedicated Bangers and Mash to his memory.

In 1991, Central sold FilmFair London to Storm Group (also known as the Caspian Group), one of FilmFair's video distributors. Altschul Group Corporation (AGC) bought FilmFair's American branch in 1992, as part of campaign to acquire more than a dozen film companies. Discovery Education, a subsidiary of Discovery Communications, bought AGC's film catalogue in 2003. As of 2026, Discovery Education is now owned by Clearlake Capital, with Francisco Partners along with Discovery, Inc.'s ultimate successors and the parent companies of Paramount Pictures and Warner Bros., Skydance Corporation, holding minority stakes.

=== Sale of FilmFair London to CINAR and reopening (1996-2002) ===
On 1 November 1996, it was announced that CINAR Films, a Canadian-based company, agreed to a deal with the Caspian Group to purchase FilmFair London's catalogue and production amenities for $10.5 Million. The deal would include all television, video, music publishing, licensing and merchandising rights, and the opportunity to produce new episodes of select shows. The deal was completed at the end of the month.

On 25 March 1997, CINAR announced the opening of their London-based European production and distribution studio CINAR Europe. Alongside that, they had announced that they had also reopened FilmFair as a fully-fledged animation studio to produce new content with their parent company, as well as remaster and restore their existing catalogue for an international expansion. The first two shows to be produced under the revived studio would be The Wombles and The Adventures of Paddington Bear, themselves being revivals of shows FilmFair previously produced. The company also co-produced the series The Upstairs Downstairs Bears in 2000, and announced a revival of Simon in the Land of Chalk Drawings in November 2001, which would be handled in Canada by CINAR themselves.

Following CINAR's founders being implicated in a financial scandal in 2000, CINAR Corporation went under major economic issues. The company announced that they would put up CINAR Europe for sale in September 2001 but after being unable to find a buyer, the company shut down in February 2002 with all sales and distribution activity moving to CINAR's main headquarters in Montreal.

In 2004, after being bought out under new management, CINAR Corporation rebranded to Cookie Jar Group, which in turn was acquired by DHX Media (now WildBrain) in 2012, thus acquiring the rights to the European FilmFair properties and making DHX the largest independent producer of kids programming with 8,550 half hours up from 2,550.

== Productions ==
=== Animated television series ===
Title	Original broadcast	Channel	Animation	Director(s)
The Herbs	1968	BBC1	Stop motion	Ivor Wood
Hattytown Tales	1969–1973	Thames for ITV	Stop motion	Ivor Wood
The Adventures of Parsley	1970	BBC1	Stop motion	Ivor Wood
The Wombles	1973–1975	BBC1	Stop motion	Ivor Wood; Barry Leith (dir. of animation)
Simon in the Land of Chalk Drawings	1974–1976	Thames for ITV	Traditional	Ivor Wood
Paddington	1975–1986	BBC1	Stop motion	Ivor Wood; Barry Leith (dir. of animation)
The Perishers	1978–1979	BBC1	Traditional	Dick Horn
Moschops	1983	Central for ITV	Stop motion	Martin Pullen
The Adventures of Portland Bill	1983	Central for ITV	Stop motion	John Grace
The Blunders	1986	Central for ITV	Traditional	Ian Sachs
The Shoe People	1987–1993	TV-am for ITV	Traditional	Clennell Rawson
Edward and Friends	1987	BBC2	Stop motion	Martin Pullen; Jo Pullen; Jeff Newitt
Windfalls	1988	Central for ITV	Stop motion	Jenny Kenna
Stories of the Sylvanian Families	1988	Central for ITV	Stop motion	Jo Pullen; Martin Pullen
Bangers and Mash	1988	Central for ITV	Traditional	Ian Sachs
Huxley Pig	1989–1990	Central for ITV	Stop motion	Martin Pullen
Nellie the Elephant	1990–1991	Central for ITV	Traditional	Terry Ward
The Dreamstone	1990–1995	Central for ITV	Traditional	Martin Gates
Rod 'n' Emu	1991	Central for ITV	Traditional	Ian Sachs; Dick Horn
The Gingerbread Man	1992	Central for ITV	Stop motion	Martin Pullen
Astro Farm	1992–1996	Central for ITV	Stop motion	David Johnson
The Legends of Treasure Island	1993–1995	Central for ITV	Traditional	Dino Athanassiou; Simon Ward-Horner

=== Television specials ===
Title	Premiere	Channel/Network	Animation	Director
Paddington Goes to the Movies	1980	BBC1	Stop motion	Barry Leith
Paddington Goes to School	1984	BBC1	Stop motion	Martin Pullen
Paddington’s Birthday Bonanza	1986	BBC1	Stop motion	Glenn Whiting
Totally Minnie	1988	NBC	Traditional	Scot Garen
World Womble Day	1990	Central for ITV	Stop motion	Martin Pullen
The Wandering Wombles	1991	Central for ITV	Stop motion	Martin Pullen
Brown Bear's Wedding	1991	Central for ITV	Traditional	Chris Randall (anim.)
White Bear's Secret	1992	Central for ITV	Traditional	Chris Randall (anim.)

=== Pilots ===
Title	Premiere	Channel	Animation	Director
The Further Adventures of Noddy	1983	?	Stop motion	?

== See also ==
- Ragdoll Productions
- Cosgrove Hall Films
- History of British animation
- List of WildBrain programs
