= Huxley Pig =

English television series

- Starring: Martin Jarvis
- Composer: Herbert Chappell
- Country of origin: United Kingdom
- No. of series: 2
- No. of episodes: 26

Production
- Running time: 10 minutes

Original release
- Network: Central TV
- Release: 5 June 1989 – 11 December 1990

Huxley Pig is a British stop motion animated children's television series based on a series of picture books authored by Rodney Peppé.

The series was produced by FilmFair for Central TV, with narration by Martin Jarvis. 26 episodes aired between 5 June 1989 and 11 December 1990.

== General theme ==
The main character, Huxley Pig, was always dreaming of adventure, exciting professions and encounters. At the start of each episode Huxley would be in his bedroom talking to Sam the squawking seagull and wondering about something. He would open his big suitcase of dress-up clothes, try something on and say, "Hmmm, I wonder". The picture would fade and be taken away into his daydreams for the rest of the story.

In the dream, Sam the Seagull would be able to speak, in a Cockney accent, and there were many other varied characters such as:

- Vile Vincent, the vampire pig-butler
- Horace, a hamster and something of a con artist
- Cuddles, a fanged green beast
- Sidney, a snake with a lisp
- The Ringmaster, the ringmaster pig who runs the Circus
- Ethel, Gloria and Myrtle, The 3 Girls
- Lady Agatha Porker, The Lady who lives at the Hall
- The Zoo Keeper, the zoo keeper pig who only appeared in Huxley Pig at the restaurant

The adventures took Huxley and the gang to many places, as long as there was food nearby. Food was close to Huxley's heart. Upon the conclusion of the daydream, Huxley would return to reality and find a memento from the story had mysteriously returned with him.

== Episodes ==
=== Series overview ===
Series	Episodes	Originally released	
Series	Episodes	First released	Last released
1	13	5 June 1989	4 September 1989
2	13	18 September 1990	11 December 1990

=== Series 1 (1989) ===
No. overall	No. in series	Title	Original release date
1	1	"Huxley Pig at the Circus"	5 June 1989
Huxley Pig rummages through his clothes and pulls out a clown suit and dreams about being at the circus by sharing six 'Knock, Knock' jokes with Horace and struggles on the high wire but doesn't do too bad in the end.
2	2	"Huxley Pig and the Haunted House"	12 June 1989
Huxley Pig looks through a picture book about a haunted house and dreams of him and Sam visiting one called Holiday Haunts, where they meet Horace the rodent agent, the vampire-butler Vile Vincent & Cuddles the big green monster who cooks them 'Monster Burgers' to which they didn't really like, but it hurts Cuddles's feelings, then they play 'Swallow My Leader' to cheer Cuddles up.
3	3	"Huxley Pig on a Desert Island"	19 June 1989
While playing with his toy boat and sailor suit, Huxley dreams of him and Sam sailing at sea for real. After being caught in a storm, they end up on a desert island where they meet Horace the pirate and Sidney the snake and undertake a treasure hunt.
4	4	"Huxley Pig at the Beach"	26 June 1989
Huxley dreams of going to the beach. In the dream he ends up being constantly pestered to buy things by Horace, who eventually admits there are no other people on the beach because of a sea monster. Huxley goes to meet the monster.
5	5	"Huxley Pig at the Big Top"	3 July 1989
Huxley dreams of joining a circus and along with Sam performing a sticky wine gum throwing act.
6	6	"Huxley Pig at the Restaurant"	10 July 1989
When Huxley Pig dresses up as a chef he dreams of having his own restaurant, but things don't go quite according to plan. There's chaos in the kitchen and trouble at the tables, when Sidney the snake is let loose!
7	7	"Huxley Pig and the Sea Monster"	17 July 1989
Huxley Pig pulls out a sailor from the old suitcase his Granny gave him. He makes his bed into a boat- and suddenly he is at sea with Sam Seagull! They meet the "merpigs" and a monster who loves awful jokes!
8	8	"Huxley Pig Goes Flying"	24 July 1989
Huxley receives a toy plane from his granny and dreams of flying a real plane with Sam. Unfortunately, Horace is their mechanic. He forgets to fill the fuel tank, and on their test flight they crash land on Sidney's island.
9	9	"Huxley Pig Goes Camping"	31 July 1989
Putting up a tent presents a problem to Huxley and Sam, until Assistant Rodent Cub Scout Patrol Leader Horace takes a hand. When the guides arrive, Ethel takes charge and soon has everyone running about-especially Horace.
10	10	"Huxley Pig and the Abominable Snowpig"	7 August 1989
The Abominable Snowpig has been spotted and big cash prizes are offered for his photograph. Huxley Pig and Sam Seagull go to the Himalayas to warn him, but that "rotten rodent" Horace has other ideas!
11	11	"Huxley Pig and the Burglar"	14 August 1989
Detective Inspector Huxley and Detective Constable Sam set off to catch a jewel thief when they hear Lady Agatha has been burgled. Did the butler do it, or the chauffeur, or the maid? It's a slinky surprise when the thief is caught!
12	12	"Huxley Pig Makes a Movie"	21 August 1989
Huxley Pig's postcard from his Granny gives him the idea to make a film- Lawrence of Arabia". It's a low budget movie with only cardboard camels and the hero is played by the camel driver- Horace, who thinks it should be called "Horace of Arabia".
13	13	"Huxley Pig's Cinderella"	4 September 1989
Huxley Pig is going to see "Cinderella" with his Granny and wonders what it would be like to play Buttons. His pantomime turns out rather differently to the story- Cinders gets a surprise when she meets Prince Charming!

=== Series 2 (1990) ===
No. overall	No. in series	Title	Original release date
14	1	"The Magician"	18 September 1990
Huxley receives a magic set from his Granny and daydreams that he is backstage at a variety show. Because the real magician is in hospital Huxley has to take his place, assisted by the magnificent Myrtle. The high point of his act is the Watch Smashing Trick and is a smashing success with everyone except Horace, the owner of the watch.
15	2	"The Reporter"	25 September 1990
When Huxley reads in the paper that Lady Agatha has been kidnapped he knows that only an ace reporter could uncover the real story behind the headlines. In his dream, Huxley Pig and Sam Seagull, ace crime reporters, investigate the suspicious characters at the Manor. There's Vile Vincent, the creepy butler, Horace the chauffeur and Lady Agatha's pet, Cuddles. All of whom have something to hide.
16	3	"Stone Age Huxley"	2 October 1990
A toy dinosaur sparks off another of Huxley Pig's daydreams, this time he goes back to the Stone Age. After an encounter with a Giant Venus Gulltrap our heroes meet Horace, the rotten Stone Age rodent. Horace is the proud inventor of the square wheel and the signed discoverer of fire. A loud sneeze introduces Porkysaurus Rex and blows out Horace's fire.
17	4	"Huxley Pig in Space"	9 October 1990
Huxley dreams of flying through space to the asteroid Belt. He and Sam are heading for "The Final Frontier", the finest intergalactic burger bar in the universe. A malfunction in the spaceship forces them to crash land on Planet X where Horace, the rotten rodent, owns everything. Whilst Horace repairs the spaceship Cuddles takes our heroes to "The Final Frontier" for a bite to eat.
18	5	"Going Fishing"	16 October 1990
When Huxley dreams of going deep sea fishing he finds that buying a ticket for the trip from Horace is not easy. What with the advance bookings and council regulations Huxley and Sam are lucky to get the last two places. Once aboard they find that their fellow fishermen are Cuddles and Vile Vincent, Sidney is second mate and Horace is the Captain. When it is discovered that the first mate has absconded with all of the fishing gear Huxley suggests a game of tag. Cuddles overturns the boat in his excitement forcing the passengers and crew take to the lifeboat.
19	6	"The Smugglers"	23 October 1990
A book about smugglers starts Huxley dreaming of being back in the 18th century. He and Sam discover a boat laden with contraband pulled up on the beach. Startled by a noise our heroes hide and see the smugglers, Horace has blackmailed him into a life of crime. Huxley and Sam confront Horace who proves to be as rotten as ever provoking Cuddles into smashing all the contraband.
20	7	"Home Movie"	30 October 1990
Huxley Pig decides to make a home movie with the gang but he is far more concerned about his lunchbox when his cream cakes start to disappear. With help from Vile Vincent, Huxley is able to watch his finished movie and they discover who is responsible for the vanishing cream cakes
21	8	"Desert Explorer"	6 November 1990
Practicing his First Aid bandaging technique reminds Huxley of mummies and ancient Egypt. He and Sam soon find themselves at a souvenir stall in modern-day Egypt. He and Sam soon find themselves at a souvenir stall in modern-day Egypt run by Horace who cons them into buying the secret map to the undiscovered tomb and a guide book. Huxley and Sam set off....On their way they meet a snake charmer and Sydney the charming snake and later a fake fakir and Aziz the Artist, all of whom bare a remarkable resemblance to Horace. Eventually they reach the mummy's tomb where ...
22	9	"The Hairdresser"	13 November 1990
When Huxley dreams of being a hairdresser Vile Vincent, the famous horror film actor, who comes in to have both his hairs trimmed, loses the lot. Horace gets trapped in an out of control chair and Lady Agatha drops Cuddles off for a clip round the ears. An electric razor runs amok and a toupee takes on a life of its own.
23	10	"The Decorator"	20 November 1990
Lady Agatha's advertisement looking for a decorator in the paper stirs Huxley's imagination. Huxley Pig and Sam Seagull, Painters and Decorators, arrive at the Manor and meet Vile Vincent and Lady Agatha who tells them her chauffeur will supervise the work. The chauffeur turns out to be Horace who gets himself stuck in the paste bucket, stuck to the wall and throws a bucket of paint over Lady Agatha in his efforts to discredit Huxley.
24	11	"Breakfast TV"	27 November 1990
The thought of a free breakfast has Huxley turning up at the TV studios to find that all the staff have overslept. Horace, the producer, enlists Huxley's help as presenter. His first task is to interview Vile Vincent, the horror film actor who wants to plug his book. After that there is Peculiar Pets with Lady Agatha and Cuddles. Horace provides the weather and fills in for Keep Fit Fiona. However things get out of control, Cuddles starts eating the scenery, Vile Vincent desperately ties to plug his book, "Batpig" and chaos ensues.
25	12	"The Village Fete"	4 December 1990
A game of skittles starts Huxley dreaming of a village fete and when Huxley tries to show Sam how to knock down all the skittles he gets no prizes for hitting Vincent the Vicar. He tries his luck at the fortune tellers who turns out to be Horace before watching the Pork Scratchings Country Dancers featuring Cuddles and Horace. Horace tries to cheat during the raffle but Huxley saves the day.
26	13	"Going Skiing"	11 December 1990
Huxley Pig wins a 'Free Skiing Holiday' in the post and dreams about a skiing holiday of which the 'rotten' rodent instructor Horace becomes a fraud by seeing Vile Vincent's badges and certificates that he won since for 'Ski Fraud Squad' all the other skiers failed, then when dream is over he finds a 'Ski Fraud Squad' badge in his lunchbox as a 'free gift'

== DVD releases ==
So far, two DVDs of the series have been released in Region 2.

Huxley Pig at the Circus
Contains the following episodes:

1. The Circus
2. Haunted House
3. Desert Island
4. The Beach
5. The Clown

Something's Cooking
Contains the following episodes:

1. Something Cooking, Huxley Pig
2. Huxley Pig and the Sea Monster
3. Huxley Pig Goes Flying
4. Huxley Pig Goes Camping
5. Huxley Pig and the Abominable Snowpig

Despite the show never aired America, the first five episodes of series 1 and the first five episodes of series 2 appeared as bonus episodes on the Paddington Bear: The Complete Classic Series DVD released by Mill Creek Entertainment for Region 1 on 15 February 2011.

== UK VHS releases ==
Since their broadcast on ITV in 1989, episodes of the first series were released on three videos by Tempo Video except for "Huxley Pig Goes Camping" that went as part of the Video Treats for Toddlers compilation tape released by Collins Video in 1990 along with Babar, The Adventures of Parsley and The Care Bears Family.

VHS video title	Year of release	Episodes
Here Comes Huxley Pig (92492)	2 October 1989	"Huxley Pig at the Circus"; "Huxley Pig and the Haunted House"; "Huxley Pig at the Restaurant"; "Huxley Pig on a Desert Island"
The Adventures of Huxley Pig (92502)	2 October 1989	"Huxley Pig at the Beach"; "Huxley Pig at the Big Top"; "Huxley Pig and the Sea Monster"; "Huxley Pig Meets the Snow Monster"
Huxley Pig Goes Flying (93682)	6 August 1990	"Huxley Pig Goes Flying"; "Huxley Pig and the Burglar"; "Huxley Pig's Cinderella"; "Huxley Pig Makes a Movie"

On 11 February 1991. Tempo Kids Club (distributed by Abbey Home Entertainment) released a single video with two episodes from Series 1 of Huxley Pig which were "Huxley Pig Goes Camping" and "Huxley Pig and the Sea Monster" (Cat. No. 9).
NOTE: An extended version of this video was released with an extra episode which is "Huxley Pig the Hairdresser" from Season 2 of Huxley Pig which was broadcast on ITV in 1990.

In about July 1991, Tempo Pre-School (distributed by Abbey Home Entertainment) released a bumper video with four episodes from the second series of Huxley Pig which were previously broadcast on ITV in 1990 along with two previously released episodes from the first Huxley Pig series

VHS release	Year of release	Episodes
Huxley Pig: Special Edition (94972)	15 July 1991	"Huxley Pig the Magician"; "Huxley Pig the Reporter"; "Stone Age Huxley"; "Huxley Pig in Space"; "Huxley Pig and the Burglar"; "Huxley Pig at the Circus"

In Autumn 1991, a single Huxley Pig video was released and exclusively sold and distributed under license from Abbey Home Entertainment by Entertainment UK Ltd (in its "Starvision" and "Funhouse" range of children's videos) with three single episodes (one debuted episode from Season 2 which is "Huxley Pig Goes Fishing", one previously released episode from Season 2 which is "Huxley Pig In Space" and one previously released episode from Season 1 which is "Huxley Pig at the Restaurant").

VHS release	Year of release	Episodes
Huxley Pig In Space (EUKV 2028)	7 October 1991	"Huxley Pig in Space"; "Huxley Pig Goes Fishing"; "Huxley Pig at the Restaurant"

== Crew ==
Series 1

- Created by Rodney Peppé
- With the voices of Martin Jarvis
- Music Composed and Arranged by Herbert Chappell
- Director of Animation: Martin Pullen
- Animators/Associate Directors: John Gilluley, David Johnson
- Camera Assistant: Paul Street
- Model Makers: Alan Murphy, Heather Boucher
- Costumes: Lizzie Agnew
- Puppet Makers: Justin Exley, Pauline London
- Production Manager: Kath Swain
- Editors: Andi Sloss, Robert Dunbar
- Assistant Editor: Jackie Munro
- Producer: Jo Pullen
- Executive Producer: Barrie Edwards
- A FilmFair Production for Central Television
- © 1989 Rodney Peppé/FilmFair Ltd

Series 2

- Animators/Associate Directors: John Gilluley, David Johnson
- Assistant Animator: Mark Waring
- Art Director: Alan Murphy
- Model Makers: Heather Boucher, Alan Murphy, Colin Armitage, Mark Waring
- Puppet Makers: Simon Quinn, Maxine Guest
- Assistant Puppet Maker: Kevin Griffiths
- Costumes: Laura Harris
- Production Supervisor: Robert Dunbar
- Production Manager: Kate Swain
- Studio Assistant: Simon Paul
- Editor: Andi Sloss
- Assistant Editor: Simon Cox
- Executive Producer: David Yates
- A FilmFair Production for Central Television
- © 1990 Rodney Peppé/FilmFair Ltd

== Spinoffs ==
A computer game was released by Alternative Software in 1990 for the Commodore 64 and Amstrad CPC and in 1991 for the ZX Spectrum.
