= Ben Cashdan =

South African filmmaker (1901–??)

- Born: 1901
- Citizenship: South Africa
- Occupation: Film producer

Ben Cashdan is a filmmaker and television producer in South Africa. His work focuses on struggles for social justice in Africa and elsewhere, and the impact of market-based economic policies and globalisation on the poor.

Cashdan was South African producer for Harry Belafonte's biographical documentary Sing Your Song. Cashdan has also produced 4 episodes of The World Debate on BBC World News. He also developed and produced the first season of South2North, the first global talk show to be produced in Africa for a major global broadcaster. South2North airs on Al Jazeera English. In December 2013 Cashdan produced an episode of BBC Question Time on South Africa after Mandela.

Cashdan's produced the documentary "Two Trevors Go To Washington", a satirical look at two different perspectives on globalisation - seen through the eyes of South African finance minister Trevor Manuel, and Soweto social justice activist Trevor Ngwane. "Two Trevors" has been translated into 5 languages and shown at festivals and on broadcasters around the world.

In 2005 Cashdan produced a biographical documentary about former South African President Thabo Mbeki, entitled "Unauthorised: Mbeki". The documentary was pulled off air on 14 June 2006 by the South African Broadcasting Corporation a few hours before it was scheduled to air, leading to accusations against the SABC of censoring views critical of the government. Responding to public pressure the documentary was shown by the SABC in 2007. In December 2013, Cashdan's TV talk show "The Big Debate" was also pulled off air at the last minute by the SABC, again leading to accusations of censorship. The Big Debate moved to independent broadcasters e News Channel Africa (eNCA) and e.tv.
