= Paddington Bear (TV series) =

Children's animated TV series

- Genre: Comedy
- Based on: Paddington Bear by Michael Bond
- Directed by: Don Lusk; Paul Sommer; Oscar Dufau; Art Davis
- Starring: Charlie Adler; Tim Curry; Georgia Brown; Hamilton Camp; B. J. Ward; John Standing; R. J. Williams
- Composer: Tom Worrall
- Countries of origin: United States; United Kingdom
- Original language: English
- No. of series: 1
- No. of episodes: 13

Production
- Executive producers: William Hanna; Joseph Barbera
- Producer: Kay Wright
- Running time: 20 minutes
- Production companies: Hanna-Barbera Productions; Central Independent Television

Original release
- Network: Syndication (United States); ITV (United Kingdom)
- Release: 2 December 1989 – 21 January 1990

Related
- Paddington; The Adventures of Paddington Bear; The Adventures of Paddington

Paddington Bear is an animated children's television series based on the Paddington Bear stories written by Michael Bond. The show was made by Hanna-Barbera in association with Central Independent Television. In the series, the character of an American boy named David—Jonathan and Judy Brown's cousin who arrived in London on the same day as Paddington—was added to the stories. The series, part of The Funtastic World of Hanna-Barbera in 1989, lasted 13 episodes.

== Plot ==
Paddington Bear lives with the Brown family, and their American cousin, David Russell. The story also concerns the housekeeper Mrs. Bird, the antique shop owner Mr. Gruber, and their nasty next-door neighbour Mr. Curry.

== Cast ==
=== Main ===
- Charlie Adler as Paddington Bear
- Georgia Brown as Mrs. Bird
- Hamilton Camp as Mr. Gruber
- Tim Curry as Mr. Curry
- Cody Everett as Jonathan Brown
- Katie Johnston as Judy Brown
- John Standing as Mr. Brown
- B. J. Ward as Mrs. Brown
- R.J. Williams as David Russell

=== Additional voices ===
- Joe Baker
- Jared Barclay
- Earl Boen
- Victoria Carroll
- Philip L. Clarke
- Barry Dennen
- Richard Doyle
- Paul Eiding
- Judyann Elder
- Richard Erdman
- Jonathan Harris as Sir Huntley Martin
- Stanley Jones
- Rene Levant
- Tress MacNeille
- Laurie Main
- Kenneth Mars as Psychiatrist
- Brian Stokes Mitchell
- Larry Moss
- Rob Paulsen as Lifeguard Instructor
- Henry Polic II as Sir Sealy Bloom
- Clive Revill
- Russi Taylor as Sarah
- Peggy Webber

== Crew ==
- Gordon Hunt – Recording Director
- Andrea Romano – Animation Casting Director
- Jamie Thomason – Talent Coordinator
- Kris Zimmerman – Animation Casting Director

== Episodes (1989–1990) ==
No.	Title	Written by	Original release date
1	"Please Look After This Bear"	Gordon Kent	2 December 1989
As Mr. and Mrs. Brown pick up their nephew at Paddington Station, they meet a bear and decide to adopt him. They name him after the station. Paddington Bear has a little trouble adjusting to his new lifestyle, but the Browns help him out and buy him a new outfit, then go out to dinner.
2	"Calling Dr. Paddington"	Gordon Kent	3 December 1989
Mr. Curry tricks Paddington into doing his gardening chores. After a mishap that sends Mr. Curry to the hospital, Paddington regularly visits him. Paddington's most recent visit gets him exploring various departments in the hospital. A doctor gives Paddington just the solution he needs for Mr. Curry.
3	"Curtain Call for Paddington"	Gordon Kent	9 December 1989
Paddington takes the Browns' clothes to the launderette, which seem to lead to disaster but have actually turned out very well. The Brown Family go to a theatre performance thar night, during which Paddington sneaks backstage and helps the actors to succeed in their performance.
4	"Paddington's Sticky Situation"	Gordon Kent	10 December 1989
Paddington visits the marmalade factory.
5	"Bear-Hugged"	Gordon Kent	16 December 1989
Mr. Gruber has a unique antique steam-powered car and Paddington helps him to restore it for the festive parade. Unfortunately when Paddington enters a caber toss competition it gets damaged. Paddington gets caught in a wrestling match but he convinces Mr. Galore to help with Mr. Gruber's car.
6	"Paddington Meets the Queen"	Alison Bingeman	24 December 1989
Fascinated by Buckingham Palace, the Brown Family take Paddington to the Royal Mews, where he gets into a royal coach and is met with Queen Elizabeth II, but he is arrested at the Tower of London and then mixed up in a suit of armour but he makes to the Queen in time for sandwiches.
7	"The Ghost of Christmas Paddington"	Gordon Kent	25 December 1989
It's Christmas time and Paddington finds himself in some very festive adventures including his nasty neighbour mistaking Paddington for the Ghost of Christmas Past.
8	"Paddington For Prime Minister"	Bruce Morris	6 January 1990
Today is election day for PM. Mr. Gruber takes Paddington to Hyde Park where he is nominated for PM much to the astonishment of the Browns. The current PM convinces Paddington to support him, so he can keep his position. In return, Paddington is appointed the Minister of Marmalade.
9	"Goings on at Number 32"	Joe Sandusky	7 January 1990
When the television goes wrong, Paddington discovers that the repair man is really the Portobello Prowler and alerts the police.
10	"Fishing for Paddington"	Gordon Kent	13 January 1990
A day at the seaside begins to look a bit fishy when Paddington turns a paw to life-saving.
11	"Ride 'Em Paddington"	Jack Enyart	14 January 1990
The singing cowboy Rudy Tootin' finds he's got competition by the name of Paddington Bear. Paddington proves that he's just as handy with a horse and lasso as he is with a jar of marmalade.
12	"Expedition Paddington"	Bruce Morris	20 January 1990
In search of excitement, Paddington signs up for a raft expedition and finds that inflatable dinghies can be hard to handle.
13	"The Picture of Paddington Brown"	Bruce Falk and Michael Bond	21 January 1990
Paddington's Aunt Lucy in Peru is missing him, so Paddington decides to buy her a jar of marmalade and a very special painting is the only way to raise the money.

== Home media ==
On August 4, 2020, Warner Archive released Paddington Bear: The Complete Series on DVD in the United States for the first time.
