= Moschops (TV series) =

- Title card
- Also known as: Knobbel
- Genre: Children's television
- Written by: Ruth Boswell; Gregory Stewart
- Directed by: Martin Pullen
- Voices of: Bernard Cribbins
- Narrated by: Bernard Cribbins
- Composer: Daryl Runswick
- Country of origin: United Kingdom
- Original language: English
- No. of series: 1
- No. of episodes: 13

Production
- Executive producer: Graham Clutterbuck
- Producer: Ruth Boswell
- Editor: Robert Dunbar
- Running time: 11 minutes
- Production company: FilmFair

Original release
- Network: ITV
- Release: 5 July – 27 September 1983

Moschops is a British stop motion-animated children's television series produced by FilmFair, and broadcast on ITV in 1983.

The characters in Moschops are designed by Sue Marke. All of the cast are prehistoric animals, except for Flower, who is the world's first flower.

The characters' names imply their species or genus. The title character, Moschops, is a young therapsid of the genus Moschops; Ally is a theropod of the genus Allosaurus; Grandfather Diplodocus is a sauropod of the genus Diplodocus; Mrs Kerry is a ceratopsid of the genus Triceratops; Uncle Rex is a Tyrannosaurus rex; and Mr Ichthyosaurus is an ichthyosaur of the genus Ichthyosaurus.

In the series, Moschops and Ally are friends. They live in a cave with Grandfather Diplodocus and Uncle Rex.

From 1984 to 1985, Omroepvereniging VARA, the Dutch public broadcasting network, broadcast a Dutch-dubbed version titled Knobbel. Channel 4 retransmitted Moschops in 1988. The series was also broadcast in Canada on the Knowledge Network & TVOntario and New Zealand on Channel 2.

== Episode list ==
No.	Title	Original release date
1	"Moschops and The First Flower"	5 July 1983
2	"All's Well That Ends Well"	12 July 1983
3	"Night-time Sun"	19 July 1983
4	"Fiercest Dinosaur"	26 July 1983
5	"Tidiest Dinosaur"	2 August 1983
6	"Ally Takes to the Air"	9 August 1983
7	"Wheels Within Wheels"	16 August 1983
8	"Moschops's Garden"	23 August 1983
9	"Moschops's Party"	30 August 1983
10	"Just Like Me"	6 September 1983
11	"No Place Like Home"	15 September 1983
12	"Moschops's Tent"	20 September 1983
13	"Rainbow"	27 September 1983

== Video releases ==
Home video releases
Video title	Medium	Release date	Distributor	Episodes
Moschops	VHS (PAL)	?	Castle Vision	1–4
Adventures in Dinosaurland	VHS (NTSC)	5 May 1993	Family Home Entertainment	2–5
Moschops	DVD-Video (Region 2)	12 July 2004	Contender Entertainment Group	1–3
Moschops: The First Flower	DVD-Video (Region 2)	27 March 2006	Abbey Home Media	1–5
Moschops: Ally Takes to the Air	DVD-Video (Region 2)	12 March 2007	Abbey Home Media	6–10

== Moschops in print ==
For a short time after the series aired, Pippin featured a Moschops comic strip.

Purnell Publishers of Bristol published eight small picture books based on the television programme: Moschops and the Fierceness Lesson (1983), Moschops and the Mystery (1983), Moschops and the Surprise (1983), Moschops Digs a Hole (1983), Moschops and the Sneezes (1983), Moschops Plays Football (1983), Moschops' Kite (1984), and Moschops' Birthday (1984).

Other Moschops books include Moschops Annual (1983), Moschops Playtime Book (1983), and Moschops Dot-to-Dot (1984).
