= Windfalls =

- Genre: Children's television Educational television
- Created by: Jenny Kenna
- Written by: Jenny Kenna
- Directed by: Jenny Kenna
- Voices of: Peter Hawkins
- Narrated by: Peter Hawkins
- Theme music composer: Joan Alexis
- Composer: Joan Alexis
- Country of origin: United Kingdom
- Original language: English
- No. of series: 1
- No. of episodes: 26

Production
- Executive producer: Graham Clutterbuck
- Producer: Maya Kemp
- Editor: Andi Sloss
- Running time: 5 minutes
- Production companies: FilmFair; Central Independent Television

Original release
- Network: ITV
- Release: 14 April – 7 July 1989

Windfalls is a British stop motion-animated children's television series created, written, and directed by Jenny Kenna. The Windfalls stories teach children about reading signs in nature, herbal medicine, and the plants of the British countryside. All of the animated characters are real leaves, grasses, and pressed flowers.

== Plot and plant-based characters ==
The stories follow three friends: Berry, Butterbur, and Rosebay. They are Windfalls, and they live in Windfall Land. They meet many other Windfalls on their adventures. The programme features a cast of 23 supporting characters, each designed from a different plant: Cornflower, Daisy, Uncle Onion, Bella Donna, Evening Primrose, Delphinium, Nettle, Dock, Foxglove, Pampas, Daffodil, Fern Polypody, Thistle, Cowslip, Clover, Lucky Four-Leaf Clover, Vi, Ola, Pansy, Couch Grass, Twitch Grass, Holly and Ivy.

== Production ==
Windfalls was produced by FilmFair and Central Independent Television for ITV; it premiered on 14 April 1989, and ran for 26 episodes. Two episodes were transmitted back-to-back for each broadcast. When the series was syndicated on other networks, such as the Australian Broadcasting Corporation in Australia, Knowledge Network and TVO in Canada, Channel 5 in Singapore and TVNZ's Channel 2 in New Zealand, the episodes were broadcast singly. The series was also broadcast on the military channel BFBS in Germany as well as in several countries including Cyprus and the Falkland Islands but with the series transmitted back to back with two episodes just like its original UK television airings.

The programme was animated by Isabelle Perrichon, who later worked on the FilmFair animated series Rod 'n' Emu (1991).

== Episodes ==
- Fine Weather Friend
- Bella Donna
- An Evening with Primrose
- Rosebay Needs a Home
- The Wild Ones
- Nettle and Dock
- Pampas
- Weather Signs
- Springtime
- Flying Flowers
- Green with Envy
- Creatures of the Night
- Cowslip Needs Protection
- The String
- Light and Shade
- Honey Day
- Lucky Scarecrows
- Country Cousins
- The Oak Tree
- Butterbur's Marsh
- Brumble Shrub
- The Red Toadstool
- Autumn Changes
- The Invader
- Winter in Windfall Land
- Pilot Episode. Written and Created by Jenny Kenna. Animated and Directed by Malou Bonicos. Narrated by Dame Judi Dench.

== Home releases ==
Little Croft Studios distributed 18 of the 26 episodes of the series on three VHS videotapes, sold separately. Each volume has six stories:

Learn to Love Nature with the Windfalls
"Light and Shade", "The Oak Tree", "The Red Toadstool", "Autumn in Windfall Land", "The Invaders", "Winter in Windfall Land"
Learn to Love the Countryside with the Windfalls
"Country Cousins", "Weather Signs", "Lucky", "Flying Flowers", "Bramble Shrub", "Nettle and Dock"
Learn to Love the Flowers and the Trees with the Windfalls
"Fine Weather Friend", "Bella Donna", "An Evening with Primrose", "Butterbur's Marsh", "Cowslip Needs Protection", "Honey Day"
