= Nkunzi Nkabinde =

South African sangoma, author and LGBT activist

- Born: 7 December 1975; Soweto, South Africa
- Died: 24 May 2018 (aged 42)
- Occupations: Sangoma, author, activist, healer
- Known for: Author of Black Bull, Ancestors and Me: My Life as a Lesbian Sangoma

Nkunzi Zandile Nkabinde (7 December 1975 – 24 May 2018) was a South African sangoma, author, and LGBT activist. They are recognized for their work and writings surrounding LGBT life as a South African, and they are best known for their memoir Black Bull, Ancestors and Me: My Life as a Lesbian Sangoma.

== Early life and family ==
Nkabinde was born on December 7, 1975, in Soweto in Gauteng, South Africa in the midst of apartheid and six months prior to the Soweto uprising. Nkabinde’s mother, Sibongile, went into labor without her husband present because he was a truck driver who worked away from home. Her friend, Mamtshali, aided her when she went into labor, and she ran outside to find transportation to the hospital. While rushing, Mamtshali left her dompas behind, so she was aggressively arrested by police, and a neighbor had to transport Sibongile to the hospital. Mamtshali was also pregnant at the time and went into an early labor at the same hospital as Sibongile because of the aggressive force used by police officers. The baby died because it was delivered too premature to survive. That same evening, Sibongile gave birth to twins which are considered bad luck in Zulu culture. The first baby was a boy who died during childbirth. The second baby was Nkabinde, and they were named Nkunzi, or "black bull," after their male ancestor. On the day of Nkabinde’s birth, there were multiple deaths in their family, including their twin brother, paternal grandmother, and maternal uncle. This was considered extremely bad luck in their culture, and followed Nkabinde throughout their life.

== Gender identity and pronouns ==
Nkabinde was on a journey of self-discovery as they explored the intersections of their sexuality and gender identity. Initially, they identified as a lesbian sangoma and represented this within the majority of their work. Towards the end of their lifetime, they began to reimagine their identity as a transgender man. Academic Ruth Morgan, who has worked closely with Nkabinde, reports that they had intentions to release a book about their experiences as a transgender man before their death. As Nkabinde’s life was cut short during this journey, it is unsure which gender pronouns would best reflect their gender identity. Some scholars refer to Nkabinde with feminine she/her pronouns, which is what Nkabinde used for themself in their autobiography. Others use they/them as gender neutral pronouns and few use he/him as masculine pronouns.

== Life as a sangoma ==
After their mother died, Nkabinde was summoned to become a sangoma. Initially, they resisted until they were bombarded with voices, dreams, and other supernatural forces that urged them to give into becoming a sangoma. A woman came to them in their dream and told them to stop being stubborn because they were destined to perform this work. Eventually, they submitted and began their training. Once Nkabinde began to train as a sangoma, their trainer said that their lesbianism would be gone by the end of the process. However, after Nkabinde completed their training and became a sangoma, their attraction to women only grew stronger.

Nkabinde's abilities as a sangoma include connecting with and controlling their ancestors to manipulate herbs and cure illnesses.

== Academic work ==
Nkabinde has produced a variety of work and has conducted research surrounding LGBT identity as a sangoma in South Africa. This work encompasses journal articles, a documentary, and an autobiography. Nkabinde's work has been perceived as activism because its existence and publication challenges Zulu tradition and the concept that homosexuality is "un-African." In doing so, Nkabinde helps to amplify other LGBTQ narratives in South Africa and around the continent.

Nkabinde's most popular work is their memoir, Black Bull, Ancestors and Me: My Life as a Lesbian Sangoma. Within the book, they explain their familial history and culture, particularly the importance of their ancestors and how this impacts their life. They also explore their strong and unwavering attraction to women throughout the book, and their dream of having a penis. They explain how the male ancestor after which they were named is dominant, present in their life, and influences their sexuality, including their identity as a lesbian. They attribute many of their strong sexual urges for women to the desires of their dominant male ancestor, Nkunzi.

In 2004, Nkabinde joined Busi Kheswa to interview same-sex sangomas and presented this research with Ruth Morgan, the Director of the Gay and Lesbian Archives in South Africa (GALA). They shared their findings in Dublin, Ireland at a lesbian conference.

Nkabinde was involved with the African Women's Life Story project. This project was one of GALA's and it was for the Sex and Secrecacy Conference at Wits University. Nkabinde's work consisted of workshops, same-sex life story research of women sangomas, and a presentation of their findings. This research is the basis of the chapter that Nkabinde co-wrote in Tommy Boys, Lesbian Men, and Ancestral Wives: Female Same-Sex Practices in Africa. Nkabinde explains that this interview work for GALA drastically altered their view of the world and changed the way they perceived their own culture and lifestyle.

Nkabinde can be seen on Season Three of The Big Debate, entitled Is Homosexuality un-African?. During this episode, they explain their perspective as a lesbian sangoma on how they do not believe homosexuality to be un-African. They spread awareness on the existence of LGBT sangomas in African culture and challenge the idea that the identities and lifestyles of those in the LGBT community are inherently un-African.

== Death ==
Nkabinde died on May 24, 2018. The cause of death is unknown.
