= The Adventures of Paddington Bear =

Animated television series

- Based on: Paddington Bear by Michael Bond
- Directed by: Marcos DaSilva (seasons 1–2); François Perreault (season 3)
- Voices of: Jonathan Kydd; Jon Glover; John R. Hernandez; Eve Karpf; Cyril Shaps; Nigel Lambert; Meriam Stover; Moir Leslie; Steven Webb; Jade Williams; John Baddeley
- Theme music composer: Milan Kymlicka
- Opening theme: "He's Paddington Bear (One of a Kind)"
- Ending theme: "He's Paddington Bear (One of a Kind)" (instrumental)
- Composer: Milan Kymlicka
- Countries of origin: Canada; France
- Original languages: English; French
- No. of seasons: 3
- No. of episodes: 39 (117 segments)

Production
- Executive producers: Micheline Charest; Ronald A. Weinberg
- Producer: Cassandra Schafhausen
- Editor: Natalie Rossin
- Running time: 24 minutes
- Production companies: CINAR Corporation (Note: Animation outsourced to and production services by Wang Film Productions (season 1), Morning Sun Animation Group (season 2), and SMEC Media and Entertainment (season 3).); Protecrea; FilmFair

Original release
- Network: Teletoon (Canada); Canal J (France, seasons 1–2); TF1 (France); ITV (CITV) (United Kingdom, Series 1-2)
- Release: June 14, 1997 – February 2, 2000

Related
- Paddington; Paddington Bear; The Adventures of Paddington

The Adventures of Paddington Bear is an animated children's television series based on the Paddington Bear stories written by Michael Bond, co-produced by the CINAR Corporation, FilmFair and Protecrea, in co-production with Canal J for seasons 1 and 2 and the participation of Teletoon, TF1 and ITV – the latter for seasons 1 and 2.

The series was broadcast from June 14, 1997 to February 2, 2000. 39 episodes (117 segments) were produced.

== Plot ==
The show follows the adventures of a bear from Peru that comes to England after an earthquake destroys his home. The Brown family finds him at Paddington Station.

== Cast ==
- Jonathan Kydd as Paddington
- Jon Glover and John R. Hernandez as Mr. Henry Brown
- Meriam Stover and Moir Leslie as Mrs. Mary Brown
- Eve Karpf as Mrs. Sheila Bird
- Jade Williams as Judy
- Steven Webb as Jonathan
- Nigel Lambert as Mr. Reginald Curry
- Cyril Shaps as Mr. Samuel Gruber
- Unknown voice actress as Aunt Lucy

== Telecast and home media ==
The show was first introduced on Teletoon's launch in Canada. It was also shown on ITV in the United Kingdom and both Canal J and TF1 in France.

The show was aired in the U.S. on the Cookie Jar Toons block on This TV from November 2008 until August 2009. It was also shown on HBO Family in repeats until 2004 in the 1990s. In 2017, it aired on Starz Kids and Family until April 2020. It also aired on Light TV (now TheGrio.TV). Qubo Channel aired repeats of the show from October 7, 2018, until February 25, 2021.

HBO's sister company, Time-Life Home Video released the series on both VHS and DVD.

As of 2022, the show is now streaming on Paramount+ and Tubi.

== Episodes ==
- All 39 episodes were made in digital ink-and-paint animation.

=== Season 1 (1997–98) ===
No.	Title	Written by	Original release date
1	"A Visit to the Hospital" / "Paddington Takes to the Road" / "The Last Dance"	Joe Fallon Matthew Cope Rick Jones	June 14, 1997
Paddington accidentally lands Mr. Curry in the hospital. His visit to the hospital gets an over-privileged Mr. Curry back on his feet.; In Paris, Paddington gets involved in a Tour de France bike race. He wins, making the Castille Village famous.; Paddington practices dancing for a Charity Ball. His dance with his partner does not go as planned, but wins first place.
2	"Paddington Goes Underground" / "Paddington in the Ring" / "Mr. Curry Lets Off Steam"	Peter Landecker & Lucie Lortie Brendan Walsh	July 5, 1997
Padding travels back and forth on the London Underground trains, with Judy and Mrs. Brown looking for him.; In Japan, Paddington visits a Sumo Wrestling school, but in training confronts and eventually outwits the champion Yokozuna.; Paddington accidentally locks Mr. Curry in Mr. Brown's birthday surprise Sauna, but eventually manages to rescue him.
3	"A Visit to the Bank" / "A Spot of Fishing" / "Bear's Job Week"	Thomas LaPierre Frances Gallager Joe Fallon	July 26, 1997
Paddington thinks his money has been stolen in a robbery. He is mistaken for a suspect, but the real crook is caught shortly.; Paddington goes on a fishing trip with Mr. Gruber and Admiral Grundae. They are all marooned on an island.; Paddington participates in Job Week hoping to raise money for Aunt Lucy. Helping Mr. Curry seems to spell disaster, but it works out well.
4	"Paddington and the Stately Home" / "The Opal of My Eye" / "Too Much Off the Top"	Rowby Goren Joe Fallon Rick Jones	August 16, 1997
Mr. Gruber takes Judy, Jonathan and Paddington to the Lucman stately home. Paddington causes Lucman some inconvenience during the tour.; Mr. Gruber and Paddington go on a tour of the opal mining capital Coober Pedy. By chance, Paddington uncovers Black Opals.; Paddington helps out at Mr. Sloop's barber shop, coming across an American who takes an interest in Mr. Gruber's antiques.
5	"Adventure at the Seaside" / "Paddington and the Pyramid Selling" / "Paddington and the Finishing Touch"	Paul Mullie Peter Landecker & Lucie Lortie	September 6, 1997
The Brown family go to the beach. Paddington is washed out to sea, but is rescued by two fishermen.; On a visit in Egypt with Mr. Gruber, Paddington is conned by a trickster, but Mr. Gruber sorts him out.; Paddington buys Mr. Gruber a rock for his patio, causing a few mishaps on the way. The rock makes a perfect coffee stand.
6	"Paddington Turns Detective" / "Seeing is Believing" / "A Visit to the Theatre"	Brian Cameron Fuld Joe Fallon Bruce Robb & Patrick Granleese	September 27, 1997
Padding does detective work to find who stole Mr. Brown's prized pumpkin, but unwittingly gets a common burglar to be caught.; On a tour in an Irish castle, Paddington and Mr. Gruber help a youngling to rekindle her fascination of the old Leprechaun stories.; The Brown family go to watch a play at the theatre. Paddington goes backstage and helps to improve the performance.
7	"Paddington at the Wheel" / "Howdy Paddington" / "A Shopping Expedition"	Christel Kleitsch Dennise Fordham Joe Fallon	October 18, 1997
Mr. Brown is in trouble with court for a driving mishap. Then Paddington takes Mr. Brown's driving test for him.; In Montana, Mr. Gruber and Paddington practice horse riding. Billy Bob steals Loretta's cows, but is caught and the cows recovered.; Mrs. Brown and Judy take Paddington to the mall. He gets elevator sick, then wanders around, and unwittingly gives the mall publicity.
8	"Paddington Gets a Raise" / "Bonhomme Paddington" / "Everything Comes to Those Who Wait"	Stephen Ashton Lucie Lortie & Peter Landecker Joe Fallon & Rick Jones	November 8, 1997
Paddington tries to raise money to buy a Gift-o-Gram for Mr. Brown's birthday. However, Mr. Gruber has just the answer.; In Quebec, Paddington visits an ice palace and enters an ice sculpture contest and wins a canoe race.; Paddington comes across a house, where he is required to wait on and cook for Mrs. Smith Chumley.
9	"Paddington Hits Out" / "Ranger Paddington" / "Paddington's Puzzle"	Joe Fallon Joseph Mallozzi Peter Landecker	December 13, 1997
Mr. Curry has Paddington as his golf caddy, after an accident takes his place as golfer. Paddington manages to win the golf tournament.; On an African safari, Paddington trails some poachers and with the help of an ostrich manages to catch them and rescue Mr. Gruber and the ranger.; Paddington makes a jigsaw puzzle out of Mr. Curry's precious painting and tries to make it up to him.
10	"Paddington Cleans Up" / "Riding High" / "Paddington Dines Out"	Ken Ross Joe Fallon Lucie Lortie	17 January 1998
Paddington ends up getting swindled by a conman selling faulty vacuum-cleaners, but Mr. Curry gets the perpetrator arrested.; Mr. Gruber takes Paddington to a horse-race, and when one of the jockeys is injured and unable to compete, Paddington takes his place and wins.; It is Paddington's birthday and the Browns and Mr. Gruber give him a special treat; dinner at an expansive restaurant.
11	"Paddington Keeps Fit" / "Paddington Goes to Washington" / "Trouble at the Launderette"	Nicole Keefler Brian Cameron Fuld	14 February 1998
Paddington buys a body builder, but Mr. Curry cons Paddington to get a money back guarantee, which backfires on him.; Paddington visits Washington D.C. with Mr. Gruber.; Paddington does laundry at the launderette for Henry and Curry, and while it did not go exactly as planned the attempt went better than ok.
12	"The Case of the Doubtful Dummy" / "The Greatest Paddington on Earth" / "Paddington Goes to Court"	Rick Jones Joe Fallon Peter Landecker & Lucie Lortie	7 March 1998
Paddington is hoping to solve a mystery and eventually nabs a jewel-thief who was hoarding jewels in a dummy.; Paddington joins a Chinese travelling circus. Paddington's accidents create new ideas for a successful performance.; Paddington and Mr. Gruber visit a courthouse to see a trial in action, where Paddington gets mistaken for another "Mr. Brown".
13	"The Treasure Hunt" / "Paddington Goes to Hollywood" / "Mr. Gruber's Mystery Tour"	Dennise Fordham Patrick Granleese & Joe Fallon	28 March 1998
Paddington goes treasure hunting to find his lost coins and Mrs. Brown's wedding ring. Eventually, Paddington figures a Magpie took them.; Paddington and Mr. Gruber take a tour of Hollywood and Paddington himself gets to be a movie star.; Mr. Gruber takes Paddington to a wax museum, where waxworks are falling and being damaged. Paddington finds a squirrel is the culprit.

=== Season 2 (1998–99) ===
No.	Title	Written by	Original release date
14	"A Disappearing Trick" / "Paddington Saves the Day" / "Paddington Goes to School"	Ken Segall The Trio Rick Jones & Rowby Goren	2 May 1998
On his other birthday, Paddington develops an interest in magic and gets himself a magic set, where he later attempts to put on a show with it.; Paddington recalls a cricket game he competed in to Jonathan and Judy.; Paddington is requested to attend school, though the principal later decides that it is unnecessary.
15	"Old Master Paddington" / "Paddington and the Pardon" / "A Picnic on the River"	Ken Segall Joe Fallon, Peter Landecker & Lucie Lorter	23 May 1998
After developing a liking for art Paddington and Mr. Curry accidentally mess up Henry's painting for an art contest, though it went better than expected (except for Mr. Curry).; In a town in France Paddington joins a band.; While setting up a picnic Paddington ends up losing his hat (along with Mrs. Bird's umbrella) in the river and is devastated.
16	"A Day to Remember" / "Paddington in Spain" / "A Most Unusual Ceremony"	Patrick Granleese The Trio & Nicole Keefler	13 June 1998
Paddington is invited to be a ring-bearer at a wedding for a pair of grocery-sellers he is close to, though it does not go exactly according to plan.; In Saville, Paddington and Mr. Gruber help out with Maria and her family. By accident, Paddington helps Maria to do a Flamenco Dance.; The Brown Family is invited to a ceremony by Sir Huntley Martin. Paddington is delayed but makes it on time.
17	"Paddington Steps Out" / "Paddington Prepares" / "Paddington Recommended"	Rick Jones The Trio Bruce Robb	4 July 1998
Judy takes Paddington to a play at her school and Paddington joins in.; Before Paddington can go with Mr. Gruber's on a world trip he is thought to be suspicious at the airport until he finds his passport.; After dressing up in a fancy tuxedo, Paddington gets special treatment at a fancy restaurant.
18	"Paddington Goes to the Dentist" / "Paddington's Dinosaur" / "Paddington's First Flight"	Barbara Bryan, Thomas LaPierre & The Trio Don Arioli & Daryl Brown Daniel Rendek & Michael F. Hamill	25 July 1998
After Paddington ate a hard-crunchy nut, he suffers a problem in his teeth and has to go to a dentist.; Paddington and Mr. Gruber visit a dinosaur dig in Canada. Paddington unwittingly annoys Mr. Ditzbury and then stumbles on a new fossil.; Paddington won a contest for hairiest legs to water-ski and with Mrs. Bird's umbrella created a new form of parasailing.
19	"Paddington Breaks the Peace" / "Paddington Takes Off" / "Trouble at Number 32"	The Trio & Paul Mullie Ken Segall & Joan Scott Ken Ross	15 August 1998
Mr. Curry takes advantage of Paddington's gardening skills in the hopes to win a best-garden contest, and despite a mishap with Curry's lawnmower both ended up winning first-prize.; Paddington and Mr. Gruber visit a NASA-center, and Paddington himself gets picked to replace an out-of-commission astronaut but does not have to go into space after fixing a spaceship's radio.; On a snowy day, Mr. Curry requests Paddington to shovel snow out of his walkway, but also got Curry locked out of his own home.
20	"Paddington in a Hole" / "Paddington in the Galapagos" / "Paddington Strikes a Bargain"	Patrick Granleese & The Trio Peter Landecker & Lucie Lortie	5 September 1998
Mr. Curry starts renovating his backyard and asks Paddington to help, and Paddington sets up a pseudo drive-through for Curry.; Paddington and Mr. Gruber visit the Galapagos Islands and Paddington himself gets followed around by a pair of documenters who mistake him for a new island-species of animal.; Paddington helps Mr. Gruber ready a vintage steam car but requires the aid of Muscles Galore after accidentally breaking it.
21	"Pantomime Time" / "Paddington in Alaska" / "A Stitch in Time"	Frances Gallager, Joe Fallon & The Trio Ken Ross	26 September 1998
The Brown Family go to the theatre to watch the pantomime Dick Whittington and His Cat. Paddington gets involved a lot on stage.; Paddington participates in a race for Lars Larson. He rescues Mr. Le Puar and takes him and a pack of wolves to town.; Paddington has to go sew Mr. Curry's clothes with an old sewing machine but messes them up. The Sew Right company solves Paddington's problem.
22	"Paddington and the Cold Snap" / "Paddington and the Yeti" / "Paddington Hits the Jackpot"	The Trio Joan Scott Ken Ross	17 October 1998
Mr. Curry wants service for his plumbing, but when Paddington does it, the pipes leak. Mr. Curry's insurance compensates for that.; In Tibet, Paddington and Mr. Gruber travel with Magarpo into the mountains, unaware they have the Yeti for company.; Paddington participates in a game-show, although the host was not too keen on letting him win.
23	"Paddington Makes a Clean Sweep" / "Paddington at the Olympics" / "Paddington and Do it Yourself"	Joe Fallon & Brian Cameron Fuld Stephen Ashton	7 November 1998
During Spring-Cleaning Paddington sweeps the chimney (unknowingly also disrupting a hired chimney-sweeper's work).; Paddington was accidentally chosen to represent Britain in the Olympics in America. Despite this, he succeeds in lighting the torch.; Paddington decides to do things himself after Curry tells him about it, but when putting the words into action, Paddington does more harm than good.
24	"In and Out of Trouble" / "Sir Paddington" / "A Spot of Decorating"	Thomas LaPierre & The Trio Ken Ross Rick Jones & Christel Kleitsch	28 November 1998
Mr. Curry sets up a raggedy hammock, but does not want anyone else to know about it (except Paddington), though it does not go very well.; Mr. Gruber takes Paddington to a medieval fair to see a jousting-tournament, but one of the knights is playing dirty and Paddington has to stop him.; After seeing some construction-workers decorate a house Paddington tries to imitate it, and while it was sloppy he did a surprisingly good job.
25	"Paddington in Touch" / "Paddington at the Dead Sea" / "Goings on at Number 32"	Ken Ross The Trio Brian Cameron Fuld	19 December 1998
Paddington's old school invites the Browns to a special rugby match against a team from Peru. Paddington finds his loyalties are divided until the Peruvian team is one man short. Paddington gets in the scrum and soon helps tie the game—thanks to a little help from his Aunt Lucy, who is in England on a surprise visit.; As a reward for all their hard work, Mr. Gruber and Paddington visit a luxurious spa on the shores of the Dead Sea. Paddington is amazed at what people do to get body and mind in shape – it looks more like torture to him – and he does his best to rescue Mr. Gruber from harm. In the end, Paddington and Mr. Gruber are exhausted and need a vacation from their vacation.; Aunt Lucy's visit to London has kept the Browns on their toes and made them exhausted, so all are greatly relieved when Paddington sets out with his Aunt to do a little shopping. Little do they know they are looking for a gift to thank Mr. Brown for being so kind to Paddington, and it is a gift that will land them smack dab in the middle of the Thames in need of rescue by the harbor patrol.
26	"A Sticky Time" / "Private Paddington" / "Paddington Buys a Share"	Daniel Rendek The Trio, Rowby Goren, Peter Landecker & Lucie Lortie	9 January 1999
After some cooking went wrong Paddington gets his limbs and chest glued together, Mrs. Bird and Mrs. Brown resort to taking him to the hospital where Paddington is successfully freed from his trapped pose, even though it costs him all the fur on his belly.; Paddington and Mr. Gruber enroll in a military school, and are rewarded for catching a pair of burglars.; A conman is on the loose and Paddington has become his latest victim, but Mr. Gruber saves the day.

=== Season 3 (2000) ===
No.	Title	Written by	Original release date
27	"Paddington Takes a Cut" / "Anchors Away" / "Paddington Passes Through"	Thomas LaPierre	January 3, 2000
Paddington decides to try a paw at topiary (the art of cutting bushes and shrubs into fantastic shapes) and luckily for the Browns, Mr. Curry asks Paddington to have a go at one of his shrubs.; Paddington and Mr. Gruber are on a cruise and unknown to Paddington his adopted-parents and Mrs. Bird were secretly on board as well (which Paddington initially thought to be a mirage).; When Paddington visits the local television station to be part of a live studio audience, he ends up in not one, not two, but three live programs that are broadcast all over England.
28	"What's Going on at Number 32" / "Paddington at the Rock Garden" / "Trouble in the Bargain Basement"	Anne-Marie Perrotta and Tean Schultz Patrick Granleese	January 4, 2000
Paddington is delighted when Mr. Brown purchases a new television and antenna. Now he can watch all his favorite programs. Unfortunately for the Browns, that is just what Mr. Curry is hoping to do as well.; Paddington tells Mr. Curry a story of his trip to the Rock Garden in India. After that, he builds Mr. Curry a statue of him.; In the bargain basement Paddington does some free demonstrations which causes inconvenience for others.
29	"Paddington Clocks In" / "Paddington Goes Swiss" / "A Day by the Sea"	Gerard Lewis Jennifer Kierans Michael F. Hamill	January 5, 2000
Mr. Curry takes Paddington to the horse race course, but they accidentally cause a bomb scare, but Paddington clears it all up.; In Switzerland, Paddington outfits himself with ski gear to take a picture of the Matterhorn, causing inconvenience for champion skier Franz.; While on the beach, Paddington again gets conned and vows to get back at his swindler, even if it means pulling random men's beards.
30	"House Training" / "Dare Devil Bear" / "Paddington the Rock Star"	Frances Gallagher John Handforth Sheryl Bennett-Wilson & Lynn Mason	January 6, 2000
Paddington finds a lost dog, though Mrs. Brown is allergic and Mr. Curry is hoping to help in the hopes to get rewarded.; There is nothing more exciting than an air show. Especially if the star attraction is a wing walking bear. Paddington's less than enthusiastic when he finds out he has to walk on the wing –– when the plane is actually in the air. Thanks to some Paddington logic, he sticks to that wing like glue.; Paddington, Mrs. Bird, Jonathan and Judy go to a rock-performance, where Paddington and the rock-star temporarily switch identities.
31	"The Amazing Paddington" / "Pirates!" / "Paddington the Host"	Patrick Granleese Ian James Corlett Jill Golick	January 7, 2000
Paddington takes interest in hypnosis and ends up hypnotizing Mr. Curry into acting like various animals (and can only be cured by a honking sound).; Paddington and Mr. Gruber visit an amusement-park to check a new pirate-ride, and, after one of the animatronics broke down, Paddington took over, making it a bit more realistic.; When Mr. Curry stubs his toe, he takes advantage of Paddington and Henry's hospitality while the women want him gone.
32	"The Great Escape" / "The Paddington Files" / "Paddington the Surveyor"	Dennise Fordham Patrick Granleese Stephen Ashton	January 10, 2000
A pair of burglars take shelter in Mr. Curry's home, but later decide to turn themselves in to get away from Paddington and his clumsiness.; After watching a late-night alien horror-movie, Paddington is convinced that anything that looks like an alien and co is an alien and co.; The fence separating the Brown's and Mr. Curry's back gardens becomes the topic of a neighborly argument when it appears that part of the Brown's garden is actually on Mr. Curry's land.
33	"Mr. Curry's Birthday Bash" / "Paddington and the Loch Ness Monster" / "Copybear"	Christel Kleitsch Michael F. Hamill Thomas LaPierre	January 11, 2000
Mr. Curry has never had a birthday party, or at least, that is what he convinces Paddington of. So when he lets slip that it is his birthday, Paddington does the neighborly thing. But one surprise guest in particular knows that Curry's up to his old tricks: Curry's mother, and she is not impressed to learn her son lied about everything.; Paddington and Mr. Gruber visit Loch Ness, at the same time a man tries to fake a monster-sighting.; Paddington delivers papers to Mr. Brown's office.
34	"Paddington Gets His Money's Worth" / "Drive Bear Drive" / "Paddington Delivers the Goods"	Joel Berger Brian Cameron Fuld Victor Nicolle	January 12, 2000
Paddington loves reading comic books so Mr. Curry agrees to give him some old ones he has in his basement, for a price. They turn out to be quite valuable. Mr. Curry tries every trick in the book to get them back, but Paddington is happy to keep and read them.; Mr. Gruber loses his glasses during driving and Paddington has to drive for him.; It is Mr. and Mrs. Brown's anniversary and Paddington's noticed Mr. Brown is behaving rather oddly. Mr. Brown is pretending he does not remember so his gift will be that much more of a surprise. But when Paddington is sent to collect the gift, a piano, it will be a miracle if the whole town does not find out about it.
35	"Paddington the Tour Guide" / "April Fools" / "Superstitious Paddington"	Mary Perchanok Thomas LaPierre & Frances Gallagher Patrick Granleese	January 13, 2000
Paddington takes a group of Chinese tourists around town.; Mr. Curry thinks Paddington's made him an April Fool, so he retaliates by sending Paddington on a fool's errand. Poor Paddington does not even know what April Fool's is. Aunt Lucy always taught him it was rude to play tricks on people. But in this case, Paddington's honesty turns out to be the best trick of all.; On a Friday the 13th, Paddington begins to believe in bad luck and tries to prevent everyone else from getting it. Ironically he is a bringer of bad luck himself in some ways.
36	"The Royal Tour" / "Gold Rush Paddington" / "Paddington Calls the Shots"	Caroline Maria & Joan Scott Gregory Kennedy Ian James Corlett	January 14, 2000
A boring royal banquet in Luxembourg becomes rather exciting when a strange, exotic dignitary arrives un-announced. Paddington Brown from Darkest Peru rubs elbows with royalty and teaches them how to have fun at a party.; Paddington unknowingly starts a new gold rush when he finds a nugget while panning for gold. It turns out the nugget is the gold tooth that fell out of Mr. Gruber's mouth, but when the truth is discovered, gold fever is out of control.; Mr. Brown's new video camera gives Paddington the idea he can make his own movie and enter a film festival. Mr. Curry gives Paddington little choice but to use him as his leading man. When Paddington shows the rough cut to Mr. Gruber, he suggests a better place for the film a blooper TV show and Paddington and Mr. Curry win first prize.
37	"The Spy Who Loved Marmalade" / "Paddington at Wimbledon" / "Paddington in the Park"	Gerard Lewis Jennifer Kierans Kim Segal	January 17, 2000
Paddington unknowingly participates in a spy-mission to retrieve a suitcase full of top-secret valuables.; Paddington is delighted to accompany Mr. Gruber to the famous tennis competition. Especially when a small misunderstanding lands him on center court getting first paw experience as a ball bear.; The local Shakespeare in the Park play is underway and Paddington is in charge of sound effects for the performance of Romeo and Juliet. Paddington's thunderclaps take everyone by surprise and make the play a resounding success when a real-life Romeo and Juliet story comes to a happy ending.
38	"One Bear's Treasure" / "Bear of Style" / "A Night at the Opera"	Tara Raquel Cates Dennise Fordham Nicole Keefler	January 18, 2000
Clutter has overtaken the Browns' life and Paddington discovers the perfect way to get rid of the pile: a car boot sale where people "pile it high and sell it cheap."; Paris is one of the world's fashion centers. So what better place for a new trend in fashion to be born, even if unexpectedly?; Paddington's voice is discovered by a famous diva who is thrilled that she has found a new talent to mold. She will present him at the opening of her new opera.
39	"Paddington the Babysitter" / "Paddington on the Orient Express" / "Paddington and the Frog of Doom"	Paula Armstrong Kristine van Dusen Lori Houzer	February 2, 2000
Mr. Curry, with his niece's baby in his arms, boasts that he knows everything about babies. His boastings force him to agree to take care of the child and he is soon in need of help. Paddington comes to the rescue, but he finds he has TWO babies to take care of: the actual baby and a frantic Mr. Curry.; The famous train, full of history and intrigue, is the perfect setting for a little dinner theatre. But what's real and what's part of the performance becomes a little blurry when Paddington's jar of marmalade sets of a mystery that is not part of the script.; While pretending to be archaeologists in the garden with Judy and Jonathan, Paddington buries the Frog of Doom - one of Mrs. Bird's more unusual teapots. Mr. Curry doesn't know it's just a game of make believe, and he's delighted to have himself a dandy new teapot - except when the curse of the Frog of Doom start to come true!

== See also ==
- Caillou
