= Paddington (TV series) =

Series of British animated shorts

- Based on: Paddington Bear by Michael Bond
- Written by: Michael Bond
- Directed by: Ivor Wood
- Voices of: Michael Hordern
- Narrated by: Michael Hordern
- Opening theme: "Size Ten Shuffle"
- Composer: Herbert Chappell
- Country of origin: United Kingdom
- Original language: English
- No. of series: 2
- No. of episodes: 56 (and 3 specials)

Production
- Executive producer: Pepper Weiss
- Production location: London
- Production company: FilmFair

Original release
- Network: BBC1
- Release: 5 January 1976 – 18 April 1980

Related
- Paddington Bear; The Adventures of Paddington Bear; The Adventures of Paddington

Paddington is a British children's animated television series based on the Paddington Bear stories written by Michael Bond. Broadcast from 1976 to 1980, the series was scripted by Bond himself, and produced by FilmFair; it was narrated by Michael Hordern, who also voiced all of the characters.

Paddington is animated in stop motion. Paddington himself is a puppet in a three-dimensional environment, whilst other characters are paper cut-outs. The final television special used a slightly different technique using 2D drawn fully animated characters.

BBC1 premiered Paddington in January 1976; the series concluded in May, but was appended by two Christmas specials in December. A second series—retitled The Adventures of Paddington—followed in October 1979, and ran until April 1980. In all, 56 episodes were broadcast, followed by three television specials: Paddington Goes to the Movies (1983), Paddington Goes to School (1984), and Paddington’s Birthday Bonanza (1987).

Paddington was the first television programme adapted from the Paddington Bear stories. Later, Paddington Bear (1989) was produced by Hanna-Barbera for broadcast syndication, while The Adventures of Paddington Bear (1997) was produced by CINAR and Protecrea.

== Source material ==
Episodes of Paddington are based on stories published in the following books by Michael Bond:

- A Bear Called Paddington (1958)
- More About Paddington (1959)
- Paddington Helps Out (1960)
- Paddington Abroad (1961)
- Paddington at Large (1962)
- Paddington Marches On (1964)
- Paddington at Work (1966)
- Paddington Goes to Town (1968)
- Paddington Takes the Air (1970)
- Paddington's Blue Peter Story Book (1973)
- Paddington at the Tower (1973)
- Paddington on Top (1974)
- Paddington Takes the Test (1979)

== Characters ==
- Paddington Bear – the protagonist, an accident-prone but well-meaning bear from Darkest Peru. He was named Paddington Brown by the Browns after they found him at Paddington Station as his Peruvian name was difficult to pronounce. He has a fondness for marmalade sandwiches and always keeps one under his hat for emergencies. He is initially found to be wearing a luggage label around his neck bearing the words "Please look after this bear. Thank you." He is also very polite, never addressing someone by their first name but always by their title (Mr., Mrs., Master or Miss).
- Mr. Henry Brown – the patriarch of the Brown family.
- Mrs. Mary Brown – the matriarch of the Brown family.
- Jonathan and Judy Brown – the Brown family children. It is never established if one is older than the other, leading to the perception they are twins.
- Mrs. Bird – the Browns stern but kind-hearted and affable nanny and housekeeper, who is treated more like a member of the family than a servant.
- Mr. Samuel Gruber – Paddington's best friend and the elderly owner of an antique shop on Portobello Road, which Paddington frequents for elevenses. Like Paddington himself, he is an immigrant to Britain, hailing from Hungary.
- Mr. Reginald Curry – the Browns nasty and ill-tempered next-door neighbour. He often seeks to get something for nothing, and frequently addresses Paddington as "Bear!".

== Broadcast ==
Paddington meets Mr. and Mrs. Brown for the first time after arriving in London Paddington station.

In 1975, FilmFair completed production of the first series, which comprised 30 episodes. The first series aired on BBC1 in 1976. The second series, which comprised 26 episodes, was titled The Adventures of Paddington. These aired in 1978 and 1979, followed by specials in 1980, 1984, and 1986. It later aired on Channel 4 with the series being shown on a wrapper programme called Take 5 which aired children's programmes that been previously shown on other networks.

The series was then briefly repeated on Children's ITV (CITV) during August 1997 in the run-up to the launch of 'Adventures of Paddington Bear'. It was then repeated on Nickelodeon from September to October 1997; and December 1997, before returning to CITV in a daily slot between March and May 1998.

Paddington and the Christmas Shopping also aired on CITV on Christmas Eve 1998. All four specials were later shown on CITV during the Christmas period of 2002 - 2003.

The series was also repeated between 2004 and 2010 numerous times on Nick Jr UK via its evening slot Nick Jr Classics - which featured the likes of FilmFair's The Wombles.

In the United States, episodes of Paddington aired on Nickelodeon as a segment on the programme Pinwheel, and as part of the syndicated series Romper Room. Paddington also aired in the early 1980s on many PBS stations as well. The Disney Channel purchased broadcast rights to Paddington in 1989 for inclusion in the programme Lunch Box, and also aired the series as post-show interstitials until 1997.

In the Republic of Ireland, the series was broadcast on Raidió Telefís Éireann.

The series later aired in Singapore on Channel 5 as part of their children's block Kids Corner.

The series was also broadcast on e.tv in South Africa during the late 2000s and early 2010s.

In Brunei, the series aired on RTB.

In Japan, it was broadcast on NHK Educational TV from 1994 to 1997.

In Hong Kong, the series was transmitted on Rediffusion Television (which later became ATV in 1982) and aired as part of a children's block called The 5 O'Clock Club.

In Germany the series aired on ZDF, Super RTL in Toggolino, RTL II in Vampy, Sat.1, Tele 5 in Bim Bam Bino, VOX, Das Erste, Kinderkanal, BR, Hr, Rbb, MDR, NDR, WDR, SWR, SR, BR-alpha, One, 3sat, Eins Plus and EinsMuXx.

In Italy, the series aired on Rai Uno in 1977.

In Australia, the Australian Broadcasting Corporation broadcast the programme in the early 1980s.

In New Zealand, it was shown on TVNZ 1 (originally TV One) in the late 1970s and during the 1980s.

== Theme music ==
The composition that became known as the Paddington Bear theme was composed by Herbert Chappell and began life as incidental music for the 1972 BBC adaptation of Lord Peter Wimsey. Its first commercial release was on the b-side of the Lord Peter Wimsey theme single in 1972, where it was titled "Size Ten Shuffle" and credited to "Boyfriends". This recording - which is not the one actually featured in Paddington - has since appeared on several TV theme compilation albums.

The composition first became connected with Paddington in a theatre show, "The Adventures of a Bear Called Paddington", in 1973. The track now had lyrics (provided by Herbert Chappell's wife Brenda Johnson) and was retitled simply "Paddington Bear". A version performed by Bernard Cribbins appeared on a four-track single of songs from the show in 1974.

The piece was re-recorded (in two different versions) for the TV show; no performers are credited onscreen apart from composer Herbert Chappell. One of these takes was released on the 1976 album "Paddington's Party Record" which credits the performers as Freddie Williams and The Master Singers. This vinyl release remains the only source of the original televised version of the Paddington theme tune.

== Episodes ==
=== Series 1: Paddington (1976) ===
No. overall	No. in series	Title	Adapted from the book	Original release date
1	1	"Please Look After This Bear"	A Bear Called Paddington (1958)	5 January 1976
The very first story, in which Mr and Mrs. Brown meet Paddington in a railway station, which results in his name.
2	2	"A Bear in Hot Water"	A Bear Called Paddington (1958)	6 January 1976
Paddington arrives at the Brown household, and Judy attempts to explain how to have a bath. Paddington does not manage very well, but in spite of this, the Browns decide to keep him.
3	3	"Paddington Goes Underground"	A Bear Called Paddington (1958)	7 January 1976
Paddington travels on the underground with Mrs. Brown and Judy, but finds himself in a spot of bother with one of the inspectors.
4	4	"A Shopping Expedition"	A Bear Called Paddington (1958)	8 January 1976
Mrs. Brown takes Paddington to buy some pyjamas, but he gets lost and mistakes a shop window for a changing room.
5	5	"Paddington and the Old Master"	A Bear Called Paddington (1958)	9 January 1976
Paddington's friend, Mr. Gruber, an antique dealer, shows Paddington a special type of painting called an "Old Master". Paddington then helps Mr. Brown win a painting competition.
6	6	"A Spot of Decorating"	More About Paddington (1959)	12 January 1976
Paddington attempts to decorate the Browns' attic, but he gets into a mess and accidentally wallpapers over the door.
7	7	"A Family Group"	More About Paddington (1959)	13 January 1976
Using his rather old-fashioned camera, Paddington attempts to take a photo of the Browns.
8	8	"Paddington Makes a Bid"	Paddington Helps Out (1960)	14 January 1976
Mr. Gruber takes Paddington to an auction. Paddington accidentally buys several items, but eventually lands a terrific bargain.
9	9	"Do-It-Yourself"	Paddington Helps Out (1960)	15 January 1976
Paddington tries his hand at D.I.Y., making a magazine rack for Mr. Curry. The story on which this episode is based is called "Paddington and 'Do It Yourself'".
10	10	"A Disappearing Trick"	A Bear Called Paddington (1958)	16 January 1976
It is Paddington's first birthday with the Browns, and they buy him a magic set, which he uses to entertain everyone.
11	11	"Something Nasty in the Kitchen"	Paddington Helps Out (1960)	19 January 1976
Mr. and Mrs. Brown are ill in bed, and the rest of the family are away, which means that the only person in charge of running the house is Paddington.
12	12	"Trouble at the Launderette"	Paddington Helps Out (1960)	20 January 1976
Paddington takes the clothes to the launderette.
13	13	"Too Much Off the Top"	Paddington at Work (1966)	22 January 1976
Paddington gets a job at a barber's shop, but the barber unwisely goes out—leaving Paddington in charge.
14	14	"A Visit to the Dentist"	Paddington Takes the Air (1970)	23 January 1976
Paddington goes to see the dentist.
15	15	"Paddington Cleans Up"	Paddington on Top (1974)	3 May 1976
Paddington makes a mess in Mr. Curry's front room to test the new vacuum cleaner he received, when the neighbour suddenly bursts in and points out that the reason for the lack of electric sockets in the house is that he uses gas!
16	16	"Trouble at Number Thirty Two"	More About Paddington (1959)	23 December 1976
Paddington engages in a snowball fight in the garden with Jonathan and Judy, but a stray snowball goes through Mr. Curry's bedroom window and melts in the middle of his bed. Later, Paddington helpfully shuts Mr. Curry's back door and locks him out of his house. Eventually, Paddington has to disguise himself as a snowbear to escape his neighbour's wrath.
17	17	"Paddington and the Christmas Shopping"	More About Paddington (1959)	4 May 1976
Paddington goes on a Christmas shopping expedition.
18	18	"Paddington's Christmas"	More About Paddington (1959)	29 December 1976
Paddington's first Christmas with the Browns is a success: he is showered with presents, and has also bought some lovely gifts for all the family. The story on which this episode is based is called "Christmas".
19	19	"Mr. Curry Takes a Bath"	Paddington Takes the Test (1979)	5 May 1976
The Browns have had a sauna installed as a present for Mr. Brown. However, Mr. Curry decides to try it out. In an attempt to keep him out, Paddington buys a combination padlock and puts it on the door, but Mr. Curry beats him to it, and pays the price when he finds himself locked in. In the meantime, Paddington tries to work out why the pre-set combination of the padlock—which is the date of his birthday—doesn't seem to open it!
20	20	"Paddington Turns Detective"	More About Paddington (1959)	6 May 1976
One night, while using his torchlight, Paddington notices that the light flashes back, and decides to investigate.
21	21	"Paddington and the Cold Snap"	Paddington Marches On (1964)	7 May 1976
Paddington attempts to mend Mr. Curry's frozen pipes, when the plumber, whom Mr. Curry still owes for his last job, refuses to help.
22	22	"Trouble at the Wax Works"	N/A	10 May 1976
Paddington goes on an outing with Mr. Gruber, and is mistaken for one of the statues in the museum.
23	23	"Paddington Makes a Clean Sweep"	Paddington Marches On (1964)	11 May 1976
Paddington has some misdemeanours attempting to clean a chimney. First he breaks a chimney brush and then gets his head stuck.
24	24	"A Sticky Time"	Paddington at Large (1962)	12 May 1976
Paddington makes some toffees. However, he accidentally gets a bit of his fur stuck in the process.
25	25	"Paddington Hits the Jackpot"	Paddington at Large (1962)	13 May 1976
Paddington appears on the quiz show Lucky For Some, and wins the money in a rather unorthodox way.
26	26	"Paddington Hits Out"	Paddington Goes to Town (1968)	17 May 1976
Paddington attends Mr. Arnold Parker's golf tournament. Mr. Curry is there too, and Paddington is surprised when he wins because his ball landed on a train track.
27	27	"A Visit to the Hospital"	Paddington Goes to Town (1968)	14 May 1976
Paddington visits Mr. Curry in the hospital, but decides to have his head checked first. When Dr. Heinz tells Paddington to say the opposite of what the doctor says, Paddington gets the better of him and opposes every word Dr. Heinz says.
28	28	"Paddington Recommended"	Paddington Takes the Air (1970)	18 May 1976
Paddington is mistaken for a famous gourmet in a restaurant. He enjoys a gargantuan meal, but then has to take the consequences.
29	29	"Fortune Telling"	Paddington Abroad (1961)	19 May 1976
Paddington visits the funfair where he has his fortune told by Madame Zaza. The story on which this episode is based is called "Paddington and the 'Pardon'".
30	30	"An Unexpected Party"	Paddington Marches On (1964)	20 May 1976
Paddington was coming downstairs for tea, when he soon found himself with everyone holding a special party in his honour. Mr. Gruber gives Paddington a book on paper tearing, and in the process, he accidentally tears one of Mr. Curry's pound notes.

=== Series 2: The Adventures of Paddington (1979–80) ===
No. overall	No. in series	Title	Adapted from the book	Original release date
31	1	"Paddington in Court"	Paddington on Top (1974)	22 October 1979
Mr. Gruber takes Paddington on an outing to the Royal Courts of Justice to watch a case. But while waiting, a misunderstanding ensues when the court nearest the bench Paddington is at call a "Mr. Brown" to the stand. The story on which this episode is based is called "Paddington Goes to Court".
32	2	"Paddington Bakes a Cake"	N/A	7 November 1979
Paddington tries to bake a cake for Mr. Curry, but when it comes to getting it in and out of the oven, it seemed far too beyond Paddington's control, and so he decides to decorate the oven—to look like a cake.
33	3	"A Picnic on the River"	Paddington Helps Out (1960)	25 October 1979
The Browns decide to go punting, but disaster strikes when Paddington is put in charge of the pole.
34	4	"Paddington's Patch"	N/A	26 October 1979
Paddington builds a rock garden.
35	5	"In and Out of Trouble"	Paddington Takes the Test (1979)	29 October 1979
Paddington has trouble using Mr. Curry's old hammock.
36	6	"Paddington at the Tower"	Paddington at the Tower (1973)	1 November 1979
Mr. Gruber takes Paddington on an outing to the Tower of London on his day off.
37	7	"A Visit to the Bank"	Paddington Abroad (1961)	2 November 1979
Paddington goes to the bank to withdraw his life savings, but doesn't know exactly what to do as it is his first time.
38	8	"Paddington Clears the Coach"	Paddington's Blue Peter Story Book	5 November 1979
Paddington manages to empty a restaurant car in a train by telling them that the fish they are eating is off: he misunderstood a chef's comment when he said it was off the menu.
39	9	"Picture Trouble"	N/A	8 November 1979
Paddington decides to have his picture taken at the seaside.
40	10	"Trouble at the Beach"	A Bear Called Paddington (1958)	2 January 1979
Paddington tries to enjoy another day at the beach, but it goes wrong with his sandcastle making. The short story on which this episode is based is called "Adventure at the Seaside".
41	11	"Keeping Fit"	Paddington on Top (1974)	9 January 1979
Paddington takes up bodybuilding, but it's harder than he thinks.
42	12	"Paddington in the Hot Seat"	Paddington on Screen (1980)	9 November 1979
Paddington visits a studio of a TV show, Sage of Britain, and finds himself in the hot seat, and in the free-for-all section, he somehow finds many people phoning and asking Paddington to be the Sage of Britain.
43	13	"Paddington and the Mystery Box"	N/A	23 January 1979
Paddington sees some people bury a box.
44	14	"Paddington's Puzzle"	Paddington on Screen (1980)	30 January 1979
Paddington uses the neighbour's painting to make a puzzle.
45	15	"Paddington Weighs In"	Paddington's Blue Peter Story Book (1973)	12 November 1979
Paddington visits a health centre.
46	16	"Paddington Takes a Snip"	Paddington on Screen (1980)	15 November 1979
After seeing an amazing magazine article about plants shaped to everyday things, Paddington tries snipping Mr. Curry's hedge into a peacock, and has a lot of trouble tidying the loose ends, until he wakes up to discover the whole escapade has been a dream. The story on which this episode is based is called "Paddington Takes a Cut".
47	17	"A Visit to the Theatre"	A Bear Called Paddington (1958)	16 November 1979
Paddington goes to see a play with the Browns, and lends a hand when actor Sir Sealy Bloom forgets his lines.
48	18	"Paddington Buys a Share"	Paddington at Work (1966)	8 April 1980
Paddington buys a share in the Portobello Rd Oil Company.
49	19	"Paddington in a Hole"	Paddington at Work (1966)	6 March 1979
Mr. Curry assigns Paddington to make him a serving hatch, all is fine until the end...
50	20	"Paddington and the Finishing Touch"	Paddington Goes to Town (1968)	13 March 1979
Paddington decides to thank Mr. Gruber for his kindness by finding him a finishing touch for his patio. When it comes to bringing it home, however, Paddington finds some surprises.
51	21	"Trouble in the Bargain Basement"	Paddington Takes the Air (1970)	14 April 1980
Paddington visits a bargain basement in a shopping store, in order to find something that was very good value. When he tries a demonstration at making pancakes with a frying pan, he accidentally flips the batter all over the audience.
52	22	"An Outing in the Park"	Paddington at Large (1962)	27 March 1979
Paddington goes to the local park to see a brass band concert, and he discovers how Schubert hadn't finished his symphony. The story on which this episode is based is called "Mr Gruber's Outing".
53	23	"Paddington Dines Out"	Paddington Helps Out (1960)	8 April 1980
The Browns go out to a posh restaurant to celebrate Paddington's birthday.
54	24	"Paddington Takes the Stage"	N/A	10 April 1979
Paddington helped the Drama Society with a performance called The Secret Plan, but during the interval, the actor seems to have lost the actual plans.
55	25	"Paddington in Touch"	Paddington on Top (1974)	15 April 1980
Paddington goes to a rugby match to see the Peruvian Reserves against the Portabello Wanderers, and Aunt Lucy joins in the match, too.
56	26	"Coming and Goings at Number Thirty Two"	N/A	18 April 1980
Paddington's Aunt Lucy comes on visit, but trouble ensues when she goes to Barkridge's to buy Mr. Brown a thank-you present.

=== Specials (1980–86) ===
Three television specials aired on BBC from 1980 to 1986.

Title	Original release date
"Paddington Goes to the Movies"	1980
Paddington visits the cinema for the first time, and performs Gene Kelly's famous dance routine from the 1952 film Singin' in the Rain.
"Paddington Goes to School"	1984
A truancy officer insists that Paddington must attend school due to his age. Paddington performs "Flight of the Bumblebee" on violin. Note: Colour was added to all the 2-D animation and backgrounds
"Paddington’s Birthday Bonanza"	1986
Paddington becomes a one-man band to raise money to buy a birthday present for Mr. Brown. Colour was added to all the 2-D animation and backgrounds. This is the first and only production in which the animated characters' mouths move when they speak.

== In popular culture ==
Paddington is seen in four adverts for Marmite in the late 2000s.

In 2009, the version of Paddington from this show appeared in The Official BBC Children in Need Medley by Peter Kay's Animated All Star Band alongside other animated characters.

== Home media ==
=== DVD ===
In Region 2, Abbey Home Media Group released the entire series on DVD-Video in the UK on 23 June 2008 (Cat. No. AHEDVD 3318).
The 2-disc set features all 56 short episodes as well as the 3 TV specials.

DVD title	Episodes
Paddington Bear - Complete DVD Collection - 2 disc set	DISC 1: Episodes 1-40: "Please Look After This Bear"; "A Bear in Hot Water"; "Paddington Goes Underground"; "A Shopping Expedition"; "Paddington and the Old Master"; "A Spot of Decorating"; "A Family Group"; "Paddington Makes a Bid"; "Do-It-Yourself"; "A Disappearing Trick"; "Something Nasty in the Kitchen"; "Trouble at the Laundrette"; "Too Much Off The Top"; "A Visit to the Dentist"; "Paddington Cleans Up"; "Trouble at Number Thirty-Two"; "Paddington and the Christmas Shopping"; "Christmas"; "Mr Curry Takes a Bath"; "Paddington Turns Detective"; "Paddington and the Cold Snap"; "Trouble at the Waxworks"; "Paddington Makes A Clean Sweep"; "A Sticky Time"; "Paddington Hits the Jackpot"; "Paddington Hits Out"; "A Visit to the Hospital"; "Paddington Recommended"; "Fortune Telling"; "An Unexpected Party"; "Paddington in Court"; "Paddington Bakes a Cake"; "A Picnic on the River"; "Paddington's Patch"; "In and Out of Trouble"; "Paddington at the Tower"; "A Visit to the Bank"; "Paddington Clears the Coach"; "Picture Trouble"; "Trouble at the Beach"; DISC 2: Episodes 41-56 and three TV specials: "Keeping Fit"; "Paddington in the Hot Seat"; "Paddington and the Mystery Box"; "Paddington Puzzle"; "Paddington Weighs In"; "Paddington Takes a Snip"; "A Visit to the Theatre"; "Paddington Buys a Share"; "Paddington in a Hole"; "Paddington and the Finishing Touch"; "Trouble in the Bargain Basement"; "An Outing in the Park"; "Paddington Dines Out"; "Paddington Takes the Stage"; "Paddington in Touch"; "Coming and Goings at Number Thirty-Two"; "Paddington Goes to the Movies"; "Paddington Goes to School"; "Paddington's Birthday Bonanza"

In Region 1, Mill Creek Entertainment (under licence from Cookie Jar Group) released the complete series on DVD on 15 February 2011 in a 3-disc set entitled Paddington Bear: The Complete Classic Series which includes 5 bonus episodes of The Wombles and 10 bonus episodes of Huxley Pig and also released on the same day, the first disc was also released as a single DVD called Paddington Bear: Marmalade Madness which includes the same 5 bonus episodes of Huxley Pig.

=== UK VHS Releases ===
In 1980, Thorn EMI Entertainment released six VHS video cassettes in the UK, each with five episodes from the first series. They released two more cassettes in 1982, each with five episodes from the second series. In August 1983, they released a single video cassette featuring ten episodes from the second series. In December 1983, they released the TV special of Paddington Goes to the Movies on a single video cassette along with five episodes from the second series.

VHS title	Catalogue number	Release year	Episodes
Paddington's 1st 'Anywhen' T.V. Show	EVH 20032 / TVF 900032 2	1980	"Please Look After This Bear"; "A Bear in Hot Water"; "Paddington Goes Underground"; "A Shopping Expedition"; "Paddington and the Old Master"
Paddington's 2nd 'Anywhen' T.V. Show	EVH 20033 / TVF 900033 2	1980	"Mr Gruber's Mystery Tour"; "A Family Group"; "A Spot of Decorating"; "Paddington Turns Detective"; "Trouble at Number Thirty-Two"
Paddington's 3rd 'Anywhen' T.V. Show	EVH 20034 / TVF 900034 2	1980	"Paddington and the Christmas Shopping"; "Christmas"; "Too Much Off the Top"; "A Visit to the Dentist"; "Do-It-Yourself"
Paddington's 4th 'Anywhen' T.V. Show	EVH 20035 / TVF 900035 2	1980	"A Disappearing Trick"; "Paddington and the Cold Snap"; "Paddington Makes a Clean Sweep"; "An Unexpected Party"; "Paddington Hits the Jackpot"
Paddington's 5th 'Anywhen' T.V. Show	EVH 20036 / TVF 900036 2	1980	"A Sticky Time"; "Paddington Hits Out"; "A Visit to the Hospital"; "Paddington Makes a Bid"; "Paddington Recommended"
Paddington's 6th 'Anywhen' T.V. Show	EVH 20037 / TVF 900037 2	1980	"Something Nasty in the Kitchen"; "Trouble at the Laundrette"; "Paddington Cleans Up"; "Mr. Curry Takes a Bath"; "Fortune Telling"
Paddington's 7th 'Anywhen' T.V. Show	TVF 900750 2	1982	?
Paddington's 8th 'Anywhen' T.V. Show	TVF 900762 2	1982	"Paddington in Court"; "In and Out of Trouble"; "Paddington and the Mystery Box"; "Paddington Buys a Share"; "Paddington Dines Out"
Paddington's 9th 'Anywhen' T.V. Show	TVF 900855 2	1983	"A Picnic on the River"; "Paddington's Patch"; "A Visit to the Bank"; "Paddington's Puzzle"; "Paddington Takes the Stage"; "Paddington Bakes a Cake"; "Paddington at the Tower"; "Keeping Fit"; "A Visit to the Theatre"; "Trouble in the Bargain Basement"
Paddington Goes to the Movies	TVF 900867 2	1983	"Paddington Goes to the Movies"; "Picture Trouble"; "Paddington In A Hole"; "Paddington and the Finishing Touch"; "An Outing in the Park"; "Comings and Goings at Number 32"

In June 1987, Screen Legends released two single video cassettes containing five episodes from the first series on each one.

VHS title	Catalogue number	Release year	Episodes
Paddington's 1st 'Anywhen' T.V. Show	SL 1007	1987	"Please Look After This Bear"; "A Bear In Hot Water"; "Paddington Goes Underground"; "A Shopping Expedition"; "Paddington and the Old Master"
Paddington's 2nd 'Anywhen' T.V. Show	SL 1008	1987	"Mr Gruber's Mystery Tour"; "A Family Group"; "A Spot of Decorating"; "Paddington Turns Detective"; "Trouble at Number Thirty-Two"

In Autumn 1987, Screen Legends released a "Double Bumper Issue" video cassette containing 10 episodes from the first series.

VHS title	Catalogue number	Release year	Episodes
Paddington's 3rd and 4th 'Anywhen' T.V. Shows	SL 1009	1987	"Paddington and the Christmas Shopping"; "Christmas"; "Too Much Off The Top"; "A Visit to the Dentist"; "Do-It-Yourself"; "A Disappearing Trick"; "Paddington and the Cold Snap"; "Paddington Makes a Clean Sweep"; "An Unexpected Party"; "Paddington Hits the Jackpot"

In 1988, Screen Legends released a single video cassette with 10 episodes.

VHS title	Catalogue number	Release year	Episodes
Paddington's 5th and 6th 'Anywhen' T.V. Shows	SL 1064	1988	"A Sticky Time"; "Paddington Hits Out"; "A Visit to the Hospital"; "Paddington Makes a Bid"; "Paddington Recommended"; "Something Nasty in the Kitchen"; "Trouble at the Laundrette"; "Paddington Cleans Up"; "Mr. Curry Takes a Bath"; "Fortune Telling"

In 1988, Screen Legends had released a 'Watch and Play'-type video with five stories from the first series.

VHS title	Catalogue number	Release year	Episodes
A Taste of Paddington	SL 3004	1988	"A Sticky Time"; "Paddington Hits Out"; "A Visit to the Hospital"; Paddington Makes a Bid"; "Paddington Recommended"

On 4 March 1991, Abbey Home Entertainment released two videos with 10 stories on each tape.

VHS title	Catalogue number	Release year	Episodes
A Bear Called Paddington	94732	1991	"Please Look After This Bear"; "A Bear in Hot Water"; "Paddington Goes Underground"; "A Shopping Expedition"; "Paddington and the Old Master"; "A Spot of Decorating"; "A Family Group"; "Paddington Makes a Bid"; "Do-It-Yourself"; "A Disappearing Trick"
Paddington's; Holiday Fun	94742	1991	"Trouble at the Waxworks"; "A Picnic on the River"; "Paddington at the Tower"; "Paddington Clears the Coach"; "Picture Trouble"; "Trouble at the Beach"; "A Visit to the Theatre"; "Comings and Goings at Number Thirty Two"; "Fortune Telling"; "An Unexpected Party"

On 15 July 1991, Abbey Home Entertainment released a special edition video with 12 episodes.

VHS title	Catalogue number	Release year	Episodes
Paddington Bear - Special Edition	94992	1991	"Please Look After This Bear"; "Something Nasty in the Kitchen"; "Trouble at the Laundrette"; "A Shopping Expedition"; "Fortune Telling"; "Too Much Off The Top"; "A Visit to the Dentist"; "A Family Group"; "A Picnic on the River"; "Paddington Cleans Up"; "Mr. Curry Takes A Bath"; "Comings and Goings at Number 32"

On 9 September 1991, Abbey Home Entertainment released a Christmas-themed video with 10 episodes.

VHS title	Catalogue number	Release year	Episodes
Paddington's; Christmas Special	95122	1991	"Trouble at Number Thirty-Two"; "A Sticky Time"; "Paddington Dines Out"; "Paddington and the Christmas Shopping"; "Paddington Weighs In"; "Paddington in the Hot Seat"; "Christmas"; "Paddington's Puzzle"; "Paddington Takes the Stage"; "Paddington and the 'Cold Snap'"

On 19 September 1994, BMG Video released a single video cassette with the three feature-length specials.

VHS title	Catalogue number	Release year	Episodes
Paddington Goes to School	74321 22762 3	1994	"Paddington Goes to School"; "Paddington's Birthday Bonanza"; "Paddington Goes to the Movies"

On 28 December 1994, Abbey Home Entertainment released a single video release with eight episodes from the second series.

VHS title	Catalogue number	Release year	Episodes
Paddington Bear - In and Out of Trouble	97442	1994	"In and Out of Trouble"; "Paddington In Court"; "A Visit to the Bank"; "Paddington Buys a Share"; "Paddington Takes a Snip"; "Paddington's Patch"; "Paddington in a Hole"; "Paddington and the Finishing Touch"

On 3 April 1995, Abbey Home Entertainment released a 3-hour biggest ever video cassette with 37 episodes.

VHS title	Catalogue number	Release year	Episodes
Paddington Bear - The Biggest Ever Video	976122	1995	"Paddington Goes Underground"; "A Shopping Expedition"; "A Spot of Decorating"; "Paddington and the Christmas Shopping"; "Paddington Hits Out"; "Paddington Makes a Bid"; "Mr Curry Takes a Bath"; "Paddington Hits The Jackpot"; "Trouble at the Laundrette"; "Paddington Makes a Clean Sweep"; "A Family Group"; "Do-It-Yourself"; "Fortune Telling"; "Paddington Bakes a Cake"; "A Picnic on the River"; "Paddington Clears The Coach"; "In and Out of Trouble"; "A Visit to the Hospital"; "Trouble at the Beach"; "Paddington in a Hole"; "Picture Trouble"; "Trouble at the Bargain Basement"; "Paddington in Touch"; "Paddington Buys a Share"; "Paddington Weighs In"; "Paddington's Patch"; "A Visit to the Theatre"; "An Outing In The Park"; "Paddington's Puzzle"; "Paddington Takes The Stage"; "A Sticky Time"; "Paddington Recommended"; "A Visit to the Bank"; "A Visit to the Dentist"; "Paddington Takes a Snip"; "Keeping Fit"; "Paddington and the Cold Snap"

On 18 March 2002, Universal Pictures (UK) Ltd released a single video cassette with ten episodes from the first series.

VHS title	Catalogue number	Release year	Episodes
Paddington – Please Look After This Bear And Other Stories	9058833	2002	"Please Look After This Bear"; "Something Nasty in the Kitchen"; "Trouble at the Laundrette"; "A Shopping Expedition"; "'Fortune Telling"; "Too Much Off The Top"; "A Visit to the Dentist"; "A Family Group"; "Paddington Cleans Up"; "Mr. Curry Takes A Bath"

On 22 July 2002, Universal Pictures (UK) Ltd released a seaside-themed bumper video with nine episodes from the second series.

VHS title	Catalogue number	Release year	Episodes
Paddington - Seaside Special	9068533	2002	"Paddington Clears the Coach"; "Picture Trouble"; "Trouble at the Beach"; "Keeping Fit"; "Paddington and the Finishing Touch"; "A Picnic on the River"; "An Outing in the Park"; "Paddington Dines Out"; "Paddington In Touch"

On 21 April 2003, Universal Pictures (UK) Ltd released two videos with seven episodes on each one.

VHS title	Catalogue number	Release year	Episodes
Paddington - A Visit to the Theatre and other stories	8200692	2003	"A Visit to the Theatre"; "Paddington's Patch"; "Paddington Makes A Clean Sweep"; "Paddington and the Mystery Box"; "Paddington at the Tower"; "Paddington Turns Detective"; "Paddington in Court"
Paddington - An Unexpected Party and other stories	8200694	2003	"An Unexpected Party"; "A Spot of Decorating"; "Trouble at the Bargin Basement"; "Trouble at the Waxworks"; "In and Out of Trouble"; "A Visit to the Bank"; "Paddington Hits the Jackpot"

=== UK DVD releases ===
Between 2006 and 2007, three DVD releases of Paddington Bear were published by Abbey Home Media in the 'Tempo TV Classics' range of children's DVD releases.

DVD title	Catalogue number	Release year	Episodes
Paddington Bear - Please Look After This Bear	AHEDVD 3154	2006	"Please Look After This Bear"; "A Bear in Hot Water"; "Paddington Goes Underground"; "A Shopping Expedition"; "Paddington and the Old Master"; "A Spot of Decorating"; "A Family Group"; "Paddington Makes a Bid"; "Do-It-Yourself"; "A Disappearing Trick"; "Something Nasty in the Kitchen"; "Trouble at the Laundrette"
Paddington Bear - Too Much Off The Top	AHEDVD 3183	2006	"Too Much Off The Top"; "A Visit to the Dentist"; "Paddington Cleans Up"; "Trouble at Number 32"; "Mr Curry Takes a Bath"; "Paddington Turns Detective"; "Paddington and the Cold Snap"; "Trouble at the Waxworks"; "Paddington Makes A Clean Sweep"; "A Sticky End"
Paddington Bear - Hits the Jackpot	AHEDVD 3206	2007	"Paddington Hits the Jackpot"; "Paddington Hits Out"; "A Visit to the Hospital"; "Paddington Recommended"; "Fortune Telling"; "An Unexpected Party"; "Paddington In Court"; "Paddington Bakes A Cake"; "A Picnic On The River"; "Paddington's Patch"; "In and Out of Trouble"; "Paddington at the Tower"

On 8 October 2007, Abbey Home Media released two of the TV specials on a single DVD release.

VHS title	Catalogue number	Release year	Episodes
Paddington Bear; Goes to the Movies	AHEDVD 3263	2007	"Paddington Goes to the Movies"; "Paddington's Birthday Bonanza"

On 27 October 2008, Abbey Home Media released a suitcase-shaped DVD box set with four single DVD releases.

VHS title	Catalogue number	Release year	Episodes
Paddington Bear – Disc 1 - Please Look After This Bear	AHEDVD 3362	2008	"Please Look After This Bear"; "A Bear in Hot Water"; "Paddington Goes Underground"; "An Shopping Expedition"; "Paddington and the Old Master"; "An Spot of Decorating"; "A Family Group"; "Paddington Makes a Bid"; "Do-It-Yourself"; "An Disappearing Trick"; "Something Nasty in the Kitchen"; "Trouble at the Laundrette"; "Too Much Off The Top"; "A Visit to the Dentist"; "Paddington Cleans Up"
Paddington Bear – Disc 2 - Trouble at Number 32	AHEDVD 3363	2008	"Trouble at Number 32"; "Paddington and the Christmas Shopping"; "Christmas"; "Mr Curry Takes a Bath"; "Paddington Turns Detective"; "Paddington and the Cold Snap"; "Trouble at the Waxworks"; "Paddington Makes a Clean Sweep"; "A Sticky Time"; "Paddington Hits The Jackpot"; "Paddington Hits Out"; "A Visit to the Hospital"; "Paddington Recommended"; "Fortune Telling"; "A Unexpected Party"
Paddington Bear – Disc 3 - Paddington In Court	AHEDVD 3364	2008	"Paddington In Court"; "Paddington Bakes A Cake"; "A Picnic on the River"; "Paddington's Patch"; In and Out of Trouble"; "Paddington at the Tower"; "A Visit to the Bank"; "Paddington Clears the Coach"; "Picture Trouble"; "Trouble at the Beach"; "Keeping Fit"; "Paddington in the Hot Seat"; "Paddington and the Mystery Box"; "Paddington's Puzzle"; "Paddington Weighs In"
Paddington Bear – Disc 4 - A Visit to the Theatre	AHEDVD 3365	2008	"Paddington Takes a Snip"; "A Visit to the Theatre"; "Paddington Buys a Share"; "Paddington in a Hole"; "Paddington and the Finishing Touch"; "Trouble in the Bargain Basement"; "An Outing in the Park"; "Paddington Dines Out"; "Paddington Takes the Stage"; "Paddington in Touch"; "Comings and Goings at Number 32"; "Paddington Goes to the Movies"; "Paddington Goes to School"; "Paddington's Birthday Bonanza"

On 21 May 2012, Abbey Home Media released four episodes from the first series and eight episodes from the second series which were compiled together as twelve London-themed episodes on a single DVD release.

DVD title	Catalogue number	Release year	Episodes
Paddington Bear in London	AHEDVD 3533	2012	"Please Look After This Bear"; "Paddington Goes Underground"; "A Shopping Expedition"; "Trouble at the Waxworks"; "Paddington in Court"; "A Picnic on the River"; "Paddington at the Tower"; "A Visit to the Bank"; "A Visit to the Theatre"; "Paddington and the Finishing Touch"; "An Outing in the Park"; "Paddington Dines Out"

DVD title	Catalogue number	Release year	Episodes
Paddington Bear- Paddington's Christmas	AHEDVD 3510	2012	"Christmas"; "Trouble at Number Thirty-Two"; "Paddington and the Christmas Shopping"; "Trouble at the Waxworks"; "A Family Group"; "A Sticky Time"; "Paddington Hits the Jackpot"; "The Unexpected Party"; "Paddington Bakes a Cake"; "In and Out of Trouble"; "Paddington and the Mystery Box"; "Paddington's Puzzle"

On 18 April 2016, to coincide with the Queen's 90th birthday, Abbey Home Media released a special "Royal Celebration"-themed DVD release which contained the three TV specials altogether on one single disc.

DVD title	Catalogue number	Release year	Episodes
Paddington Bear - A Royal Celebration	AHEDVD 3903	2016	"Paddington's Birthday Bonanza"; "Paddington Goes to the Movies"; "Paddington Goes to School"

On 28 October 2024, Fabulous Films released the entirety of the show on DVD and Blu-Ray, now completely restored for the first time ever from available 16mm sources. It contains two discs featuring all fifty-six episodes and the three TV specials and features never-before-seen content, like a bonus feature on FilmFair animator Barry Leith, a feature comparing the footage of Paddington before and after the restoration treatment, a behind-the-scenes featurette (known on the cover as a "Marmalade Sandwich Feature" because on the Bonus Features menu the option is highlighted by a marmalade sandwich) and English subtitles that weren't present on the Abbey Home Media DVDs.

=== US VHS Releases ===
In 1985 and 1986, Walt Disney Home Video released five VHS volumes in the US.

VHS title	Catalogue number	Release year	Episodes
Paddington Bear: Volume One	754V	1985	"Please Look After This Bear"; "A Bear In Hot Water"; "Paddington Goes Underground"; "A Shopping Expedition"; "A Disappearing Trick"; "A Family Group"; "A Spot of Decorating"; "Paddington Turns Detective"; "Too Much Off The Top"; "Fortune Telling"; "Paddington Makes a Bid"
Paddington Bear: Volume Two	755V	1985	"Do It Yourself"; "Paddington Dines Out"; "Something Nasty in the Kitchen"; "Trouble in the Launderette"; "Paddington Cleans Up"; "Paddington and the ‘Cold Snap’"; "Paddington Makes a Clean Sweep"; "An Unexpected Party"; "A Visit to the Dentist"; "Paddington Hits Out"; "Paddington in Touch"
Paddington Bear: Volume Three	756V	1985	"Christmas"; "Comings and Goings at Number Thirty Two"; "Mr. Curry Takes A Bath"; "A Visit to the Bank"; "Paddington's Puzzle"; "A Picnic on the River"; "Picture Trouble"; "A Visit to the Theatre"; "Trouble in the Bargain Basement"; "Paddington Buys a Share"; "Paddington and the Finishing Touch"
Paddington Bear: Volume Four	757V	1985	"Paddington’s Patch"; "In and Out of Trouble"; "Paddington at the Tower"; "Paddington and the ‘Old Master’"; "Paddington Takes the Stage"; "Paddington and the Mystery Box"; "Paddington Clears the Coach"; "Paddington Weighs In"; "Trouble on the Beach"; "An Outing in the Park"; "Paddington in Court"
Paddington Bear: Volume Five	758V	1986	"Paddington Recommended"; "Mr. Gruber's Mystery Tour"; "Paddington in the Hot Seat"; "Paddington in a Hole"; "Paddington Takes a Snip"; "Keeping Fit"; "Paddington Bakes a Cake"; "Trouble at Number Thirty-Two"; "Paddington and the Christmas Shopping"; "Paddington Hits the Jackpot"; "A Sticky Time"; "A Visit to the Hospital"

In 1987, HBO Video released video cassettes.

VHS title	Catalogue number	Release year	Episodes
Paddington Goes To The Movies	6658-2	1987	Paddington Goes To The Movies

In 1988, Kids Klassics released video cassettes.

VHS title	Catalogue number	Release year	Episodes
Paddington Goes To The Movies	No. K6360	1988	Paddington Goes To The Movies

In 1989, GTK, Inc. released six videocassettes as part of their Video Classics Library. The only known release is Paddington's Birthday Bonanza.

VHS title	Catalogue number	Release year	Episodes
?	?	1989	?
?	?	1989	?
?	?	1989	?
?	?	1989	?
?	?	1989	?
Paddington’s Birthday Bonanza	No. 2517	1989	"Paddington’s Birthday Bonanza"

== See also ==
- The Wombles (1973)
- Old Bear Stories (1993)
