= The Wombles (1973 TV series) =

British stop-motion animated TV series (1973–1975)

- Series 2 intro title
- Genre: Children’s animation Comedy
- Created by: Elisabeth Beresford
- Written by: Elisabeth Beresford
- Directed by: Ivor Wood
- Voices of: Bernard Cribbins
- Narrated by: Bernard Cribbins
- Theme music composer: Mike Batt
- Opening theme: "The Wombling Song"
- Country of origin: United Kingdom
- Original language: English
- No. of series: 2
- No. of episodes: 60

Production
- Producer: Graham Clutterbuck
- Animators: Ivor Wood; Barry Leith
- Running time: 4 minutes
- Production company: FilmFair London

Original release
- Network: BBC1
- Release: 5 February 1973 – 24 October 1975

Related
- The Wombles (1997 TV series)

The Wombles is a British stop-motion animated children's television series based on the books written and created by Elisabeth Beresford. The series follows the adventures of the Wombles, who are creatures that live underground, collecting and recycling human rubbish.

The theme of the programme was to teach about the boost to the idea of recycling, and to fit the growing awareness of environmental issues.

The series first aired on 5 February 1973 on BBC1, and last aired on 24 October 1975. The original television series was regularly screened for many years. After FilmFair was acquired by the Canadian company Cinar Films (later WildBrain) in 1997, a new series of episodes was created, with three new Womble characters.

== Production ==
After the first Wombles book, published in 1968, was featured on the BBC1 children's television programme Jackanory, the BBC commissioned producer FilmFair to create a television series of the books. The series was produced by Graham Clutterbuck and directed by Ivor Wood using stop-motion.

Ivor Wood originally designed The Wombles for television with pointed snouts and floppy ears, distinct from the teddy bear-like animals illustrated in the original books. The characters, which Beresford had based on members of her family, were all voiced by actor Bernard Cribbins, who also narrated the series. Sets and model making were by Barry Leith. Two series of 30 five-minute episodes were produced, with the first series airing in 1973, animated by Ivor Wood, and the second in 1975, animated by Barry Leith.

After production of the series ended, Ivor Wood went on to produce other children's programmes including Postman Pat.
