= The Big Debate =

South African television debate series

- Also known as: The Big Debate South Africa
- Genre: Politics
- Presented by: Siki Mgabadel
- Country of origin: South Africa
- Original language: English
- No. of episodes: 32

Production
- Running time: 48 minutes
- Production company: Broad Daylight Films Foundation

Original release
- Network: eNCA e.tv
- Release: 1 February 2009 – present

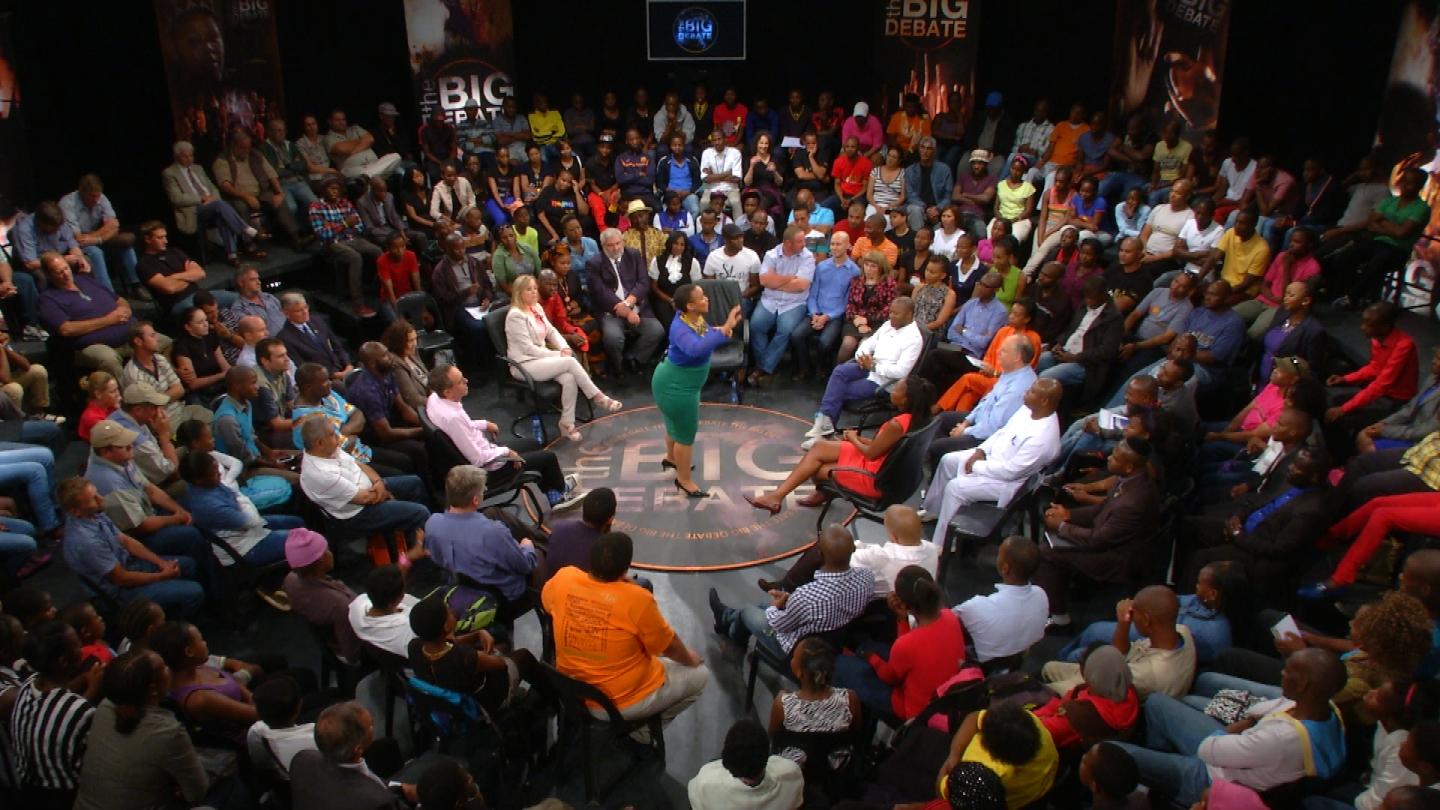
The Big Debate on Racism, 1 February 2014

The Big Debate South Africa is a South African television debate series with a focus on pertinent contemporary political topics to South Africa. It is conducted in a "town hall debate" style with the presenter, Siki Mgabadeli, interviewing key guests, asking questions, and moderating the subsequent debate. It began running in 2009 and was devised by filmmaker Ben Cashdan. The show is produced by Broad Daylight Films Foundation, a non-profit production company, based in Johannesburg.

== Broadcast ==
As of 2014, THE BIG DEBATE is broadcast on eNCA in South Africa every Tuesday at 9pm. eNCA is to be found on the Multichoice/DSTV satellite platform in South and Southern Africa on Channel 403. It also airs on the free to air channel e.tv every Sunday at 10am. The SABC announced that it would be shown on SABC 2 from 2018 on wards.

As of 2021, The Big Debate will air on eIndia.

== Controversy ==
In October 2013, the South African Broadcasting Corporation pulled the show off the air just a few hours before the broadcast of an episode on Workers Rights, citing 'editorial oversight' as the reason for the show's axing. The cancelled show dealt in some detail with the killing of 34 mineworkers at Marikana by the South African police.

Campaign groups, including the Right2Know Campaign in South Africa and the Freedom of Expression Institute described the cancellation of the show by the SABC as censorship, accusing the national broadcaster of pulling the show to prevent government critics from appearing on television. Various commentators and media freedom groups described the SABC's explanation for pulling the show as far fetched, noting the irony that a TV series promoting open debate was cancelled on press freedom day. It was subsequently reported in the national press that the National Union of Mineworkers (NUM) had pressured the SABC to cancel the series just hours before the airing of the episode on Workers Rights, as this episode was to reveal that the NUM was losing support to rival trade unions (although the SABC refuted that they came under outside pressure).

Shortly after the show was canned by the SABC, it started to air on South Africa's independent 24-hour news channel, eNCA.

Since moving to a new broadcaster, ten episodes have aired. After a recent episode where young South Africans were invited to put questions to leaders of political parties, one critic writing in an Afrikaans newspaper described the show as "Too much of a shouting match".

== History ==
Season 1
No of shows: 6
Frequency: Monthly
Dates: February 2009 - July 2009
Presenter: Dan Moyane
Executive Producer: Ben Cashdan
Broadcaster: e News Chanel (now eNCA) and e.tv
Locations: Johannesburg & Cape Town
Topics: (1) Zimbabwe (2) The Elections (3) Crime (4) Sex & Culture (5) The Arms Deal (6) Health Care

Season 2
No of Shows: 6
Frequency: Weekly
Dates: November 2009 - December 2009
Presenter: Redi Tlhabi
Executive Producer: Ben Cashdan
Broadcaster: e News Chanel (now eNCA) and e.tv
Locations: Johannesburg
Topics: (1) State and Civil Society, (2) Race & Transformation, (3) Jobs & Incomes, (4) International relations & human rights, (5) Education, (6) Sustainable Energy and the Environment

Season 3
In place of Series 3 of Big Debate South Africa, four episodes of The World Debate were produced for BBC World News, using the same format as The Big Debate.
No. of shows: 4
Frequency: Occasional
Dates: September 2010 - November 2012
Presenters: Zeinab Badawi, Redi Tlhabi
Executive Producer: Ben Cashdan
Main Broadcaster: BBC World News
Additional broadcasters: Several national broadcasters in Southern Africa
Locations: New York, Lusaka, Johannesburg
Topics: (1) Millennium Development Goals: What's Holding us Back? (2) Is Homosexuality UnAfrican? (3) Does Mining Benefit Africa? (4) Why Poverty?

Season 4
No of Shows: 10 new shows, plus 3 BBC shows from Series 3
Frequency: Weekly
Dates: February 2013 - May 2013
Presenter: Siki Mgabadeli
Executive Producer: Ben Cashdan
Broadcaster: SABC2
Locations: De Doorns, Johannesburg, Soweto
Topics: (1) Does Land Reform Threaten Our Future? (2) Does Public Healthcare Stand a Chance? (3) Is Homosexuality un-African? (4) Can Teachers Fix Education? (5) Have Artists Sold Out? (6) Does Mining Benefit Africa? (7) Why Poverty? (8) Is Our Economy Racist? (9) Are the Police Out of Control? (10) Have we Betrayed Women?

Season 5 (currently in production)
No. of shows: 10
Frequency: Weekly
Dates: November 2013 - March 2014
Presenter: Redi Tlhabi
Executive Producer: Ben Cashdan
Narrator: Thabang Motana
Broadcaster: eNCA and e.tv
Locations: Johannesburg, Cape Town, New York
Provisional Topics (subject to change): (1) Workers Rights (2) The Right to Communicate (3) Maternal Health (4 Water & Sanitation (5) Youth (6) Transport (7) Corruption
