= List of The Wombles episodes =

The Wombles is a stop motion animated British television series made in 1973–1975, and also a second animated series for children based on the characters created by Elisabeth Beresford transmitted in 1997 and 1998. The Wombles had remained popular with children into the 1980s. After FilmFair was acquired by the Canadian company Cinar Films in 1996, a new series of episodes was made, with a number of new Womble characters. In the UK, the series was purchased by ITV.

A stop-motion animated series of five-minute episodes was made between 1973 and 1975, along with two half-hour specials. Narration and all Womble voices for these were provided by Bernard Cribbins.

Further animated episodes, using new animation models and sets, were made by Cinar/FilmFair in 1998–1999. These were ten minutes long and had several Canadian actors provide the voices. Background music was adapted from the Wombles' records along with new compositions.

A new television series of The Wombles was announced in 2013. Richard Desmond snapped up the rights to the new TV series which would have consisted of 26 episodes each 11 minutes in length. The new series was set to be made using computer-generated imagery (CGI) and was due to air in 2015 on Channel 5. As of 2022 no further development on the series has confirmed other than its animated shorts on social media.

== 1973 series ==
=== Series 1 (1973) ===
No.	Title	Original release date
1	"Orinoco & The Big Black Umbrella"	5 February 1973
Orinoco goes for a spin on a windy day.
2	"The Rocking Chair"	6 February 1973
Great Uncle Bulgaria's rocking chair breaks and Orinoco gets stuck in a tyre.
3	"A Sticky Ending (or A Sticky End)"	7 February 1973
Orinoco & Wellington find a clever use for Toffee Papers.
4	"Great Uncle Bulgaria's Keep Fit Lesson"	9 February 1973
Great Uncle Bulgaria relives his younger years with a football.
5	"A Safe Place"	12 February 1973
Great Uncle Bulgaria needs somewhere to store an old history book.
6	"Peep-Peep-Peep"	13 February 1973
Wellington invents a telephone using cans and string.
7	"The Purple Paw Mystery"	14 February 1973
Tomsk makes a mess of making ink.
8	"Bungo's Birthday Party"	16 February 1973
Bungo thinks the others have forgotten his birthday.
9	"The Invisible Womble"	19 February 1973
Orinoco becomes convinced he's become invisible.
10	"Orinoco Sees The Light"	20 February 1973
Wellington & Tobermory play a trick on Orinoco.
11	"The Conkering Hero"	21 February 1973
Wellington finds a new use for conkers.
12	"One Pair Of Feet"	23 February 1973
Wellington nearly gets spotted by a Human Being and is saved via a cardboard box.
13	"Tobermory On Television"	26 February 1973
Tobermory puts on his own TV show.
14	"Crossed Lines"	27 February 1973
15	"Blow The Womble Down"	28 February 1973
16	"Madame Cholet Returns"	2 March 1973
17	"Weighing In Time"	18 June 1973
Orinoco is shamed into exercising by a new weighing machine.
18	"Musical Wombles"	19 June 1973
19	"Wombles And Ladders"	20 June 1973
20	"Orinoco And The Ghost"	21 June 1973
Orinoco is reluctant to go out at night after hearing a scary story.
21	"A Game Of Golf"	22 June 1973
22	"North, South, East, West"	25 June 1973
23	"The Picnic"	26 June 1973
Tomsk and Bungo foolishly trust Orinoco to carry their picnic basket.
24	"Games In The Snow"	27 June 1973
25	"The Snow Wombles"	28 June 1973
26	"What's Cooking?"	29 June 1973
The Burrow chimney is blocked
27	"Spring Cleaning Time"	2 July 1973
28	"Marrow Pie"	4 July 1973
Orinoco grows a marrow.
29	"The Cement Mixer"	5 July 1973
30	"The Circus Comes To Wimbledon"	6 July 1973
The young Wombles put on circus acts.

=== Series 2 (1975) ===
No.	Title	Original release date
1	"Bungo Up A Tree"	15 September 1975
Bungo gets stuck up a tree.
2	"Time And Slow Motion"	16 September 1975
Tobermory organises the young Wombles' tidying-up methods.
3	"Tomsk In Trouble"	17 September 1975
Tomsk is in trouble with Madame Cholet for not tidying his bed.
4	"The Largest Womble In The World"	18 September 1975
Orinoco uses a coat and a pair of boots to trick Bungo and Tomsk.
5	"Running Out Of Steam"	19 September 1975
Wellington, Tomsk and Bungo make their own train.
6	"Orinoco's Midnight Feast"	22 September 1975
Orinoco's greed ruins a midnight feast.
7	"Speak Up"	23 September 1975
Tomsk accidentally joins the water pipe to the telephone pipe.
8	"The Vanishing Pancake"	24 September 1975
9	"Madame Cholet & the Blackberries"	25 September 1975
Nobody will pick any blackberries, and that makes Madame Cholet angry.
10	"The Fruit Machine"	26 September 1975
Orinoco and Wellington make a 'mid-morning snack machine'.
11	"Portrait Of Great Uncle Bulgaria"	29 September 1975
Great Uncle Bulgaria's portrait is ruined.
12	"Very Behind The Times"	30 September 1975
An old newspaper article about a road though the common causes chaos in the burrow.
13	"Burrow Hot Line"	1 October 1975
14	"Trunk Call"	2 October 1975
Tomsk gets stuck in a hollow tree trunk.
15	"MacWomble The Terrible"	3 October 1975
A Scottish relative comes to stay.
16	"A Single Piper"	6 October 1975
17	"Porridge For Breakfast"	7 October 1975
18	"Highland Games"	8 October 1975
19	"Home Sickness"	9 October 1975
20	"Goodbye MacWomble"	10 October 1975
21	"Hiccups"	13 October 1975
Tomsk and Bungo get hiccups after eating hot buttercup crumpets.
22	"Film Show"	14 October 1975
Wellington makes a film about the Wimbledon Burrow.
23	"Pirate Gold"	15 October 1975
Tomsk and Wellington hunt for pirate treasure.
24	"Warm & Cosy"	16 October 1975
The Wimbledon Burrow needs insulating.
25	"Autumn Leaves"	17 October 1975
Wellington, Orinoco and Tomsk invent a new way to collect fallen leaves.
26	"The Wombles Times"	20 October 1975
The young Wombles make their own newspaper.
27	"Operation W.R.A.P."	21 October 1975
The young Wombles learn first aid.
28	"The Secret Snorer"	22 October 1975
Orinoco is tasked with guarding the Wombles' herb garden.
29	"Womble Fool's Day"	23 October 1975
The young Wombles play practical jokes.
30	"Womble Summer Party"	24 October 1975
The young Wombles perform magic tricks.

=== Specials (1990–1991) ===
Title	Original release date
"World Womble Day"	30 August 1990
The Wimbledon Wombles plan a surprise party for Great Uncle Bulgaria's 300th birthday.
"The Wandering Wombles"	20 December 1991

== 1997 series ==
=== Series 1 (1997) ===
No.	Title	Original release date
1	"The Ghost of Wimbledon Common"	5 March 1997
Bungo and Tomsk think they've seen a ghost.
2	"Orinoco the Magnificent"	12 March 1997
Orinoco becomes convinced he can do magic when a new arrival turns up.
3	"Tomsk to the Rescue"	19 March 1997
Tomsk saves Shansi Tarzan-style.
4	"Madame Cholet's Day Off"	26 March 1997
Madame Cholet is driven out of the Burrow after a bad day.
5	"Shansi's Surprise"	2 April 1997
A surprise party is planned for Shansi.
6	"Beautiful Boating Weather"	9 April 1997
The young Wombles go boating, but Stepney is scared of water.
7	"Camping and Cloudberries"	16 April 1997
Bungo believes there's a dragon on the prowl when the young Wombles go camping.
8	"Any Womble for Tennis?"	23 April 1997
Orinoco, Alderney and Shansi accidentally cause a scene at Wimbledon.
9	"Out of This Earth"	30 April 1997
After hearing the story of the Womble pirate One-Eyed Jamaica, Stepney goes treasure-hunting.
10	"MacWomble Is Coming"	7 May 1997
Cairngorm MacWomble the Terrible visits the Wimbledon Burrow.
11	"Spring into Action"	14 May 1997
12	"Hola Obidos"	26 May 1997
13	"Welcome Back Bungo"	28 May 1997

=== Series 2 (1998) ===
No.	Title	Original release date
1	"Car Trouble"	6 January 1998
Great Uncle Bulgaria goes on a wild ride in the Buggy - with no brakes.
2	"Deep Space Wombles"	13 January 1998
Bungo and Tomsk go for a flight in a spaceship invented by Wellington and become convinced they've landed on the Moon.
3	"Orinoco's Sick Day"	20 January 1998
Orinoco pretends to be sick to get out of work, but soon regrets it.
4	"Wild News Chase"	29 January 1998
There's a lot of jobs to be done after a terrible storm, but Tobermory leaves Tomsk in charge.
5	"MacWomble the Charming"	10 February 1998
MacWomble tries to convince Madame Cholet to help him sort out his Highland burrow.
6	"Rainy Daze"	17 February 1998
Tobermory starts behaving strangely after getting knocked on the head.
7	"Great Cake Mystery"	23 February 1998
Orinoco is falsely accused of stealing, so he and Shansi try to crack the case.
8	"Bigfoot Womble"	3 March 1998
Bungo becomes convinced that a mythical 'Bigfoot Womble' is roaming Wimbledon Common.
9	"Chaos on the Common"	10 March 1998
Wellington upgrades Stepney's barrow into a 'Wellivac', but it goes out of control.
10	"Weather Or Not"	17 March 1998
Everyone is hoping for rain.
11	"Trouble at the Thames"	24 March 1998
Stepney calls Tobermory and Wellington for help when a water pipe bursts at the Thames burrow.
12	"Great Womble Explorer"	31 March 1998
Great Uncle Bulgaria tells the young Wombles about his childhood adventures with the Womble explorer Livingstone.
13	"Womble Winterland"	7 April 1998
Snow on Wimbledon Common brings both fun and trouble.

=== Series 3 (1998) ===
No.	Title	Original release date
1	"New Year! New You!"	6 October 1998
The young Wombles make New Year resolutions, but don't stick to them very well.
2	"Alderney's Big Break"	7 October 1998
Alderney refuses to let a broken leg stop her helping with spring-cleaning.
3	"The Thingummawotsit"	8 October 1998
The young Wombles find numerous uses (and names) for a yoyo.
4	"The Sleep Wombler"	9 October 1998
A mysterious 'Phantom' is clearing up all the rubbish on the Common.
5	"A Life in the Day Of Madame Cholet"	12 October 1998
6	"Wom-TV"	13 October 1998
7	"Star Struck"	14 October 1998
8	"Practically Joking"	15 October 1998
9	"Tomsk's Pen Pal"	16 October 1998
Tomsk becomes pen pals with a young Canadian Womble.
10	"What's a Womble"	19 October 1998
Bungo pretends to have amnesia.
11	"Queen for a Day"	20 October 1998
Alderney gets to be Queen of Wimbledon, but her royal demands get out of hand.
12	"The Womble Races"	21 October 1998
13	"The Womble Times"	22 October 1998
14	"Fancy! Fancy Dress"	23 October 1998
15	"Time Travelling Tomsk"	26 October 1998
Tomsk turns the tables on Bungo and Stepney when they trick him into thinking he's time-travelling.
16	"Bungo Bingo"	27 October 1998
Bungo hosts a bingo game, but won't listen when the others try to point out problems.
17	"The Thames Burrow Adventure"	28 October 1998
18	"The Wombles of Our Discontent"	29 October 1998
19	"Riddle Me This"	30 October 1998
20	"Unlucky Me"	2 November 1998
21	"Nanny Alexandria Comes to Stay"	3 November 1998
22	"The Unwelcome Womble"	4 November 1998
23	"Shansi's Spider"	5 November 1998
Shansi trusts Tomsk to look after her pet spider Lucky, but Lucky escapes.
24	"Anchors Aweigh"	6 November 1998
25	"Womble Inventor of the Year"	9 November 1998
26	"A Visit to the Highland Burrow"	10 November 1998
