= List of animated television series of 2007 =

A list of animated television series first aired in 2007.

Animated television series first aired in 2007
Title	Seasons	Episodes	Country	Year	Original Channel	Technique
Adiboo Adventure: Inside the Human Body	1	40	France	2007	France 5	CGI
The Adventures of Gracie Lou	1	52	United Kingdom; Australia	2007	ABC	Flash
Adventure of Jumong	1	26	South Korea	2007–08	MBC	CGI
The Adventures of Little Carp	1	52	China	2007	CCTV-14	Traditional
Angels of Jarm	2	55	United Kingdom	2007–09	Five	Flash
Animalia	2	40	Australia; United States	2007–08	Network Ten; PBS Kids Go!	CGI
Arturo & Kiwi	4	52	Italy	2007–10	Rai Tre	Flash
Atout 5	2	92	France	2007	France 5	Traditional
BabyFirst Tales		24	United States	2007	BabyFirstTV	Live action/Flash
Back at the Barnyard	2	52	United States	2007–11	Nickelodeon (2007–10); Nicktoons (2011)	CGI
Banja	1	26	France	2007	Canal+	Flash
The Beeps	3	65	United Kingdom	2007–08	Five	CGI
Bizou	3	36	Canada	2007–09	APTN	Flash
Blanche	1	26	France; Italy	2007	France 5	Traditional
Bloop & Loop		50	United States, Israel	2007	BabyFirstTV	Flash
Bo on the Go!	3	55	Canada	2007–09	CBC Television	CGI
Bruno and the Banana Bunch	1	26	Canada	2007–08	CBC Television	Flash
Busytown Mysteries	2	52	Canada; Singapore (season 2)	2007–10	CBC Television	Flash
Captain Bomba		164	Poland	2007–13	4fun.tv	Flash
Care Bears: Adventures in Care-a-lot	2	26	United States	2007–10	CBS	Traditional
Ceasar and Chuy	1	26	United States	2007	LATV	Flash
Chilian Geographic	1	13	Chile	2007	Chilevisión	Flash
Chiro and Friends	1	52	South Korea	2007	EBS	CGI
Chop Socky Chooks	1	26	United Kingdom; Canada	2007–08	Cartoon Network; Teletoon	CGI
Chowder	3	49	United States	2007–10	Cartoon Network	Traditional
Code Monkeys	2	26	United States	2007–08	G4	Flash
Cosmic Quantum Ray	1	26	United States; Germany; Canada; France	2007–08	Animania HD	CGI
Creature Comforts America	1	7	United Kingdom; United States	2007	CBS; Animal Planet	Stop-motion
La Cueva de Emiliodón	5	120	Chile	2007–11	TVN	CGI
Cuocarina	1	26	Italy	2007	Rai Tre	Flash
Dao & Bazzi Boomhill Adventure	1	26	South Korea	2007–08	KBS2	Traditional
DinoSquad	2	26	United States	2007–08	CBS	Traditional
Edgar & Ellen	1	26	United States; Canada	2007–08	YTV; Nicktoons Network	Flash
Ellen's Acres	2	26	United States	2007	Cartoon Network	Flash
Finley the Fire Engine	2	78	United Kingdom; United States; Canada	2007–12	BBC One; BBC Two; CBeebies	CGI
Fluffy Gardens	2	81	Ireland	2007–10	RTÉ	Flash
Frankenstein's Cat	1	30	France; United Kingdom	2007–08	France 3	Flash
Franky Snow	1	52	France	2007	Canal J M6	Traditional
Friday: The Animated Series	1	8	United States	2007	MTV2	Flash
Friends and Heroes	3	39	Canada	2007–09	TBN; Smile of a Child	Traditional/CGI
Funky Town	1	40	United Kingdom	2007	Five	Flash
The Future Is Wild	1	26	Canada; Singapore; United States	2007–08	Discovery Kids; Teletoon	CGI
Futz!	1	26	Canada	2007–08	Teletoon	Flash
George of the Jungle	2	52	Canada; United States (season 1); Singapore (season 2)	2007–08; 2016–17	Teletoon; Cartoon Network (season 1)	Flash
Glu Glú	1	10	Chile	2007	Canal 13	
Gofrette	1	26	Canada	2007–08	CBC Television	Flash
Halvseint	2	10	Norway	2007–08	NRK1	Flash
Hana's Helpline		52	United Kingdom	2007	S4C	Stop-motion
Happy Monster Band	2	20	United States; United Kingdom	2007–08	Playhouse Disney	Flash
The Homies Hip-Hop Show	1	10	United States	2007	LATV	Stop-motion
Iggy Arbuckle	1	26	Canada; United States	2007	Teletoon	Flash
In the Night Garden...	2	100	United Kingdom	2007–09	CBeebies; BBC Two	CGI/Live-action
Jefferson Anderson	6	64	Finland	2007–13	Yle TV2	Flash
Jet Groove	1	26	France	2007–09	France 2	Flash
Jibber Jabber	1	26	Canada	2007	YTV	CGI
Jing Wei Tian Hai	1	10	China	2007	CCTV	
The Jorges	2	9	Brazil	2007–08	MTV Brasil	Flash
Katakune	1	260	Spain; Singapore	2007		CGI
Kung Foot	1	26	France	2007	TF1	Traditional
The Land Before Time	2	26	United States	2007–08	Cartoon Network	Traditional
The Large Family	2	52	United Kingdom; France	2007–10	CBeebies; TF1; Playhouse Disney	Traditional/CGI
The Legend of Qin	6	174	China	2007–present		CGI
Lil' Bush	2	17	United States; Bulgaria	2007–08	Comedy Central	Flash
Little Dodo	1	26	Germany	2007	KI.KA	Traditional
Lucy, the Daughter of the Devil	1	11	United States	2007	Adult Swim	CGI
Magi-Nation	2	52	Canada; South Korea	2007–10	CBC Television; Kids' WB (season 1)	Traditional
Magic Boy Kitchener	1	132	China	2007	CCTV-1	Flash
The Magic Roundabout (2007)	2	52	United Kingdom	2007–10	Nick Jr.	CGI
Mama Mirabelle's Home Movies	1	53	United Kingdom; United States	2007–08	CBeebies; PBS Kids	Flash
Mandarine & Cow	2	156	France	2007–12	France 3	Flash
Mikido	1	52	France	2007	France 3	CGI
Monster Buster Club	2	52	France; Canada	2007–09	TF1; YTV; Toon Disney	CGI
Moonbeam Bear	3	48	Germany	2007–11	KI.KA	CGI
Moot-Moot	1	15	France	2007	Canal+	Flash
Muffy and Jemjem	2	52	South Korea	2007–10	MBC	Flash
My Friend Rabbit	2	26	Canada	2007–08	Treehouse TV; Qubo	Flash
My Friends Tigger & Pooh	3	63	United States	2007–10	Playhouse Disney	CGI
Mykyta the Fox	1	26	Ukraine	2007	Direct-to-video (2008); Pershyi Natsionalnyi (2009)	Traditional
Nada que Ver	1	3	Venezuela; Argentina	2007	Sony Entertainment Television	Flash
Nouky & Friends	2	78	Belgium (season 1); France (season 2)	2007–08	Club RTL and TiJi (season 1); France 5 (season 2)	CGI
Number Time	2	101	United States	2007–18	BabyFirstTV	CGI (2007); Flash (2018)
The Nutshack	2	16	United States; Philippines	2007–11	Myx	Flash
The Olympic Adventures of Fuwa		100	China	2007	BRTV-KAKU	Traditional
Out of Jimmy's Head	1	20	United States	2007–08	Cartoon Network	Flash/Live-action
Peek-A-Boo, I See You!		40	United States	2007	BabyFirstTV	Flash
Pequenos Cientistas	1	13	Brazil	2007	TV Rá-Tim-Bum	CGI
Phineas and Ferb	5	157	United States	2007–present	Disney Channel	Traditional, Toon Boom Harmony (Seasons 5-6)
Pop Secret	1	26	France	2007	M6	Flash
Prophet Buddy	2	34	United States	2007–08	YouTube	Flash
PvP: The Series	1	12	Canada	2007–08	YouTube; PvPOnline.com	Flash
Raymond	2	78	France	2007–10	Canal+ Canal+ Family	Flash
Revbahaf Kingdom Rebuilding Story	1	26	South Korea	2007	MBC TV	Traditional
Revisioned: Tomb Raider	1	10	United States	2007	GameTap	Traditional
Rick & Steve: The Happiest Gay Couple in All the World	2	14	United States; Canada	2007–09	Logo TV; The Detour On Teletoon; A Vancouver Island	Stop motion
Ricky Sprocket: Showbiz Boy	2	26	Canada	2007–09	Teletoon	Flash
Ripples	2	52	Italy	2007–09	Rai 3	CGI
Roary the Racing Car	4	104	United Kingdom	2007–10	Five; Nick Jr.	Stop-motion
Rockstar Ghost	1	9	Brazil	2007	MTV Brasil	Flash
SamSam	3	143	France	2007–24	France 5 Gulli	CGI
Sea Princesses	2	104	Brazil; Australia; Spain	2007–10	Discovery Kids; ABC	Flash
Shape A Majigs		25	United States	2007	BabyFirstTV	Flash
Shaun the Sheep	7	190	United Kingdom; Germany	2007–present	CBBC; Netflix (series 6)	Stop-motion
Shenbing Kids	2	52	China	2007	CCTV-14	Traditional
Shorts in a Bunch	1	13	United States	2007–08	Nicktoons Network	Traditional/Flash/CGI/Stop Motion/Live Action
Skunk Fu!	1	26	Ireland; United Kingdom; United States	2007–08	BBC One/CBBC; TG4/RTÉ One	Flash
Slacker Cats	2	12	United States	2007–09	ABC Family (season 1); ABC Family website (season 2)	Flash
Starveillance	1	6	United States; Canada	2007	E!	Stop motion
Storm Hawks	2	52	Canada	2007–09	YTV	CGI
Super Why!	3	103	United States; Canada	2007–16	PBS Kids; CBC Television	CGI; Flash
Supernormal	3	52	United Kingdom	2007–08	CITV	Flash
Sushi Pack	2	26	United States; Canada	2007–09	CBS	Flash/Traditional
Tai Chi Chasers	3	39	South Korea; Japan	2007–08	KBS1	Traditional
Tak and the Power of Juju	2	26	United States	2007–09	Nickelodeon	CGI
Teenology	1	30	Ireland	2007	RTÉ Two	Flash
Tenida	1	52	India	2007–08	Zee Bangla	Traditional/Flash
El Tigre: The Adventures of Manny Rivera	1	26	United States; Mexico	2007–08	Nickelodeon/Nicktoons Network (United States); Nickelodeon (Latin America)	Flash
Time Jam: Valerian & Laureline	1	40	France; Japan	2007–08	France 3	Traditional
Tommy Zoom	1	30	United Kingdom	2007–08	CBeebies	Flash/Live action
Total Drama	6	145	Canada	2007–24	Teletoon (2007–14); Cartoon Network (2023–24)	Flash
Transformers: Animated	3	42	United States	2007–09	Cartoon Network	Traditional
TV Belgiek	2	113	Belgium	2007	RTL-TVI	Flash
Upin & Ipin	19	711	Malaysia	2007–present	TV9; Astro Ceria; Astro Prima; TV2	CGI
Urban Vermin	1	26	Canada	2007	YTV	CGI
Vicky & Johnny	3	104	South Korea; Spain	2007	TV3	CGI
Vipo: Adventures of the Flying Dog	1	26	Israel	2007	Hop! Channel	CGI
Water & Bubbles	2	52	Italy	2007–10	Rai Due	CGI
Wayside	2	26	Canada	2007–08	Teletoon	Traditional (season 1); Flash (season 2)
What Is It?		60	United States	2007	BabyFirstTV	Flash
Where Do They Go?		50	United States	2007	BabyFirstTV	Flash
Will and Dewitt	1	26	Canada	2007–08	YTV	Flash
Wobbly Land	1	26	Ireland	2007	Nick Jr.	Flash
WordGirl	8	130	United States	2007–15	PBS Kids Go! (2007–13); PBS Kids (2013–15)	Flash
The Wordies		63	United States	2007	BabyFirstTV	CGI
WordWorld	3	45	United States	2007–11	PBS Kids	CGI
Wrappy, Sex Police	1	13	Panama; Canada	2007	MTV Latin America	Flash
The Wumblers	1	26	United States	2007	TBN; Smile of a Child	Flash
Xavier: Renegade Angel	2	20	United States	2007–09	Adult Swim	CGI
Xingxing Fox			China	2007	CCTV	Traditional
Yo Gabba Gabba!	4	66	United States	2007–15	Nickelodeon (2007–11); Nick Jr. Channel (2012–15)	Live action/Flash
Zap Collège	1	52	France	2007	Canal J	Traditional

Anime television series first aired in 2007
Title	Episodes	Country	Year	Original Channel	Technique
Afro Samurai	5	Japan	2007	Fuji TV	Traditional
Ah! My Goddess: Fighting Wings	2	Japan	2007		Traditional
Ani*Kuri15	15	Japan	2007–08	NHK	Traditional
Ayakashi	12	Japan	2007–08		Traditional
Baccano!	13	Japan	2007		Traditional
Bakugan Battle Brawlers	52	Japan	2007–08		Traditional
Bamboo Blade	26	Japan	2007–08		Traditional
Big Windup!	25	Japan	2007	JNN	Traditional
Blue Dragon	51	Japan	2007–08		Traditional
Blue Drop	13	Japan	2007		Traditional
Bokurano	24	Japan	2007		Traditional
Buzzer Beater II	13	Japan	2007		Traditional
Clannad	23	Japan	2007–08		Traditional
Claymore	26	Japan	2007		Traditional
Code-E	12	Japan	2007		Traditional
Da Capo II	13	Japan	2007		Traditional
Dancouga Nova – Super God Beast Armor	12	Japan	2007		Traditional
Darker than Black	25	Japan	2007		Traditional
Deltora Quest	65	Japan	2007–08		Traditional
Den-noh Coil	26	Japan	2007		Traditional
Devil May Cry: The Animated Series	12	Japan	2007		Traditional
Dinosaur King	49	Japan	2007–08		Traditional
Dōjin Work	12	Japan	2007		Traditional
Dragonaut: The Resonance	25	Japan	2007–08		Traditional
Duel Masters Zero	24	Japan	2007–08		Traditional
ef – a tale of memories.	12	Japan	2007		Traditional
El Cazador de la Bruja	26	Japan	2007		Traditional
Emma – A Victorian Romance: Second Act	12	Japan	2007		Traditional
Engage Planet Kiss Dum	26	Japan	2007		Traditional
The Familiar of Zero: Knight of the Twin Moons	12	Japan	2007		Traditional
Fantastic Detective Labyrinth	25	Japan	2007–08		Traditional
Gakuen Utopia Manabi Straight!	12	Japan	2007		Traditional
GeGeGe no Kitarō	100	Japan	2007–09		Traditional
Genshiken 2	12	Japan	2007		Traditional
Getsumento Heiki Mina	11	Japan	2007		Traditional
Ghost Hound	22	Japan	2007–08		Traditional
Gigantic Formula	26	Japan	2007		Traditional
Good Luck! Ninomiya-kun	12	Japan	2007		Traditional
GR: Giant Robo	13	Japan	2007		Traditional
Gurren Lagann	27	Japan	2007		Traditional
Happy Happy Clover	13	Japan	2007		Traditional
Hatara Kizzu Maihamu Gumi	50	Japan	2007–08		Traditional
Hayate the Combat Butler	52	Japan	2007–08		Traditional
Hero Tales	26	Japan	2007–08		Traditional
Heroic Age	26	Japan	2007		Traditional
Hidamari Sketch	12	Japan	2007		Traditional
Higurashi When They Cry: Kai	24	Japan	2007		Traditional
Himawari Too!!	13	Japan	2007		Traditional
Hitohira	12	Japan	2007		Traditional
Idolmaster: Xenoglossia	26	Japan	2007		Traditional
Ikki Tousen: Dragon Destiny	12	Japan	2007		Traditional
Kaiji: Ultimate Survivor	26	Japan	2007–08		Traditional
Kamichama Karin	26	Japan	2007		Traditional
Kaze no Stigma	24	Japan	2007		Traditional
Kenkō Zenrakei Suieibu Umishō	13	Japan	2007		Traditional
KimiKiss: Pure Rouge	24	Japan	2007–08		Traditional
Kodomo no Jikan	12	Japan	2007		Traditional
Koi suru Tenshi Angelique: Kagayaki no Ashita	12	Japan	2007		Traditional
Kono Aozora ni Yakusoku o: Yōkoso Tsugumi Ryō e	13	Japan	2007		Traditional
Kōtetsu Sangokushi	25	Japan	2007		Traditional
Kotetsushin Jeeg	13	Japan	2007		Traditional
Love Com	24	Japan	2007		Traditional
Lucky Star	24	Japan	2007		Traditional
Magical Girl Lyrical Nanoha Strikers	26	Japan	2007		Traditional
MapleStory	25	Japan	2007–08		Traditional
Master of Epic: The Animation Age	12	Japan	2007		Traditional
Minami-ke	13	Japan	2007		Traditional
Les Misérables: Shōjo Cosette	52	Japan	2007		Traditional
Mobile Suit Gundam 00	25	Japan	2007–08		Traditional
Moetan	13	Japan	2007		Traditional
Mokke	24	Japan	2007–08		Traditional
Mononoke	12	Japan	2007		Traditional
Moonlight Mile 1st Season: Lift Off	12	Japan	2007		Traditional
Moonlight Mile 2nd Season: Touch Down	14	Japan	2007		Traditional
Moribito: Guardian of the Spirit	26	Japan	2007	NHK-BS2	Traditional
Moyasimon: Tales of Agriculture	11	Japan	2007		Traditional
Mushi-Uta	12	Japan	2007		Traditional
My Bride Is a Mermaid	26	Japan	2007		Traditional
Myself ; Yourself	13	Japan	2007		Traditional
Nagasarete Airantō	26	Japan	2007		Traditional
Nanatsuiro Drops	12	Japan	2007		Traditional
Naruto: Shippuden	500	Japan	2007–17		Traditional
Neuro: Supernatural Detective	25	Japan	2007–08		Traditional
Night Wizard: The Animation	13	Japan	2007		Traditional
Nodame Cantabile	23	Japan	2007		Traditional
Oh! Edo Rocket	26	Japan	2007		Traditional
Onegai My Melody Sukkiri♪	52	Japan	2007–08		Traditional
Over Drive	26	Japan	2007		Traditional
Potemayo	12	Japan	2007		Traditional
Princess Resurrection	25	Japan	2007		Traditional
Prism Ark	12	Japan	2007		Traditional
Pururun! Shizuku-chan Aha	51	Japan	2007–08		Traditional
Reideen	26	Japan	2007		Traditional
Rental Magica	24	Japan	2007–08		Traditional
Rocket Girls	12	Japan	2007		Traditional
Romeo × Juliet	24	Japan	2007		Traditional
Ryūsei no Rockman Tribe	21	Japan	2007–08		Traditional
Saint Beast: Kouin Jojishi Tenshi Tan	13	Japan	2007		Traditional
Saint October	26	Japan	2007		Traditional
Sayonara, Zetsubou-Sensei	12	Japan	2007		Traditional
School Days	12	Japan	2007		Traditional
Shakugan no Shana Second	24	Japan	2007–08		Traditional
Shattered Angels	12	Japan	2007		Traditional
Shigurui: Death Frenzy	12	Japan	2007		Traditional
Shining Tears X Wind	13	Japan	2007		Traditional
Shinkyoku Sōkai Polyphonica	12	Japan	2007		Traditional
Shion no Ō	22	Japan	2007–08		Traditional
Shuffle! Memories	12	Japan	2007		Traditional
Shugo Chara!	51	Japan	2007–08		Traditional
Sisters of Wellber	13	Japan	2007		Traditional
Sketchbook ~full color's~	13	Japan	2007		Traditional
Skull Man	13	Japan	2007		Traditional
Sky Girls	26	Japan	2007		Traditional
Sola	13	Japan	2007		Traditional
Star of the Giants – Father Ittetsu	13	Japan	2007		Traditional
The Story of Saiunkoku Second Series	39	Japan	2007–08		Traditional
Sugarbunnies	26	Japan	2007		Traditional
Tetsuko no Tabi	13	Japan	2007		Traditional
Tōka Gettan	26	Japan	2007		Traditional
Tokyo Majin	14	Japan	2007		Traditional
Tokyo Majin 2	12	Japan	2007		Traditional
Toward the Terra	24	Japan	2007		Traditional
Venus Versus Virus	12	Japan	2007		Traditional
Wangan Midnight	26	Japan	2007–08		Traditional
Yasai no Yousei: N.Y. Salad	52	Japan	2007–08		
Yes! PreCure 5	49	Japan	2007–08		Traditional
You're Under Arrest: Full Throttle	24	Japan	2007–08		Traditional
Zero Duel Masters	12	Japan	2007		Traditional
Zombie-Loan	11	Japan	2007		Traditional

== See also ==
- List of animated feature films of 2007
- List of Japanese animation television series of 2007
