= List of Da Capo II episodes =

The following is an episode list for the anime adaptation of the Da Capo II series of games, including Da Capo II: Second Season. The Da Capo II anime first season, animated by Feel (who animated Da Capo: Second Season), originally aired from 1 October to 24 December 2007 on the Japanese networks Chiba TV, Sun TV, and TV Aichi, and was directed by Oikawa Kei. As it was a general-audience anime, the explicit scenes of the original game were likewise omitted. The second season Da Capo II: Second Season, produced by Feel, originally aired between 5 April 2008 and 28 June 2008.

== Summary of series ==
=== Da Capo II ===
No.	Title	Original air date
1	"The Season of Small Love"; Transliteration: "Chiisana Koi no Kisetsu" (Japanese: 小さな恋の季節)	October 1, 2007
The story takes place about 50 years later on the island of Hatsune-Jima where Yoshiyuki Sakurai, who lives next door to his Asakura step-sisters Yume and Otome, who are the granddaughters of Jun'ichi and Nemu. The sakura trees are blooming everlasting as Kazami Academy set up their annual festival. Sakura Yoshino is the school's principal who still keeps her youthful appearance despite being in her sixties. Yoshiyuki and friends go along through the festival. Yoshiyuki's childhood friend Koko Tsukishima confesses to him at the cherry blossom tree in Sakura Park.
2	"Bananas and Humans"; Transliteration: "Banana to Ningen" (Japanese: バナナと人間)	October 8, 2007
Yoshiyuki wakes up early before Yume and Otome, and Wataru Itabashi is shock to see Yoshiyuki and Koko together. Suginami and Yoshiyuki walk into the secret basement of Principal Sakura's office where they accidentally awaken the robot Minatsu Amakase from her slumber (an android like Miharu Amakase). Maika Mizukoshi puts Yoshiyuki in charge of caring Minatsu by feeding her bananas though she says she dislikes them, but Yoshiyuki can see she actually likes them.
3	"First Lesson"; Transliteration: "Fāsuto Ressun" (Japanese: ファーストレッスン)	October 15, 2007
Yoshiyuki becomes friends with Nanaka Shirakawa the school's idol (Kotori Shirakawa's granddaughter from Jun'ichi). Yoshiyuki joins the school music band which Koko, and Wataru are in also, after hearing Nanaka sing. Yume invites Minatsu over for dinner; surprise to know there's bananas in Otome's delicious cooking. Yoshiyuki hopes to know Koko more.
4	"In the Autumn Wind"; Transliteration: "Akikaze no Naka de" (Japanese: 秋風の中で)	October 22, 2007
Kazami Academy is holding its athletic festival. And it becomes frustrating for Yoshiyuki, while his friends are causing a lot of commotion for him. Koko tries to get Yoshiyuki alone to take a picture with her, but fails until the end of the day.
5	"2 cm Distance Remaining"; Transliteration: "Ato Ni Senchi no Kyori" (Japanese: あと2センチの距離)	October 29, 2007
Yoshiyuki and Koko go on their first date. With Akane Hanasaki, Anzu Yukimura, Wataru, and Nanaka spying on them partially in a Café until their cover is blow. Yoshiyuki and Koko hold hands in the end.
6	"I Hate Humans"; Transliteration: "Ningen Kirai" (Japanese: 人間キライ)	November 5, 2007
Otome asks Yoshiyuki to befriend Minatsu. Failing to do so after seeing Minatsu having a joyful time, he accidentally bumps into her the next day where she drops her plans to take over the world. Embarrassed by the situation, Minatsu begs Yoshiyuki not to reveal her plans. Minatsu reveals why she hates humans and slowly becomes friends with Yoshiyuki as they spend time together.
7	"Sudden Storm"; Transliteration: "Niwaka Arashi" (Japanese: にわか嵐)	November 12, 2007
Nanaka is in a predicament after turning down another male student at school. Yoshiyuki defends her when someone tries to blackmail them to Koko; though she believes him. Nanaka's confused about her feelings towards Yoshiyuki. She gets locked outside on the roof of the school in a storm. Luckily, Yoshiyuki came back to find his notebook and saves her.
8	"Bright Sunshine Time"; Transliteration: "Hakujitsu no Toki" (Japanese: 白日の時)	November 19, 2007
Minatsu's true identity is revealed when she saved Yume from an accident that occurs (mysteriously) while Yoshiyuki and everyone else were shopping for his class upcoming school trip. Maika and Sakura give their best regards to Yoshiyuki for Minatsu. After the revelation, Minatsu remains a friend to everyone, however Koko and the class rep Maya Sawai seem concerned.
9	"Love Patterned Road to Japan"; Transliteration: "Koi Moyō Yamatoji" (Japanese: 恋模様大和路)	November 26, 2007
The class field trip to Nara arrives; Sakura gives Yoshiyuki a pendant while Otome and Yume relieve his worries. During the trip, Maya shows an unusual behavior towards robots. Koko begins to question her relationship with Yoshiyuki. They promise each other to visit a shrine on the last day of the trip. However, Yoshiyuki receives a depressing call from Yume.
10	"Feelings Growing Hazy"; Transliteration: "Kasunde Iku Omoi" (Japanese: 霞んでいく想い)	December 3, 2007
Rumors spread throughout the school about Minatsu being a robot. The Asakura sisters try to defend her. Otome collapses from the stress, and Yoshiyuki returns immediately to check on her, breaking his promise with Koko. Otome dreams about her past with Yoshiyuki. When Yoshiyuki's class returns from the trip he finds Koko disappointed in him. Maya confronts Yoshiyuki about the rumors of Minatsu; she then reports it to the student council. Maika reveals the reason for Maya's hate for robots.
11	"Koko, Heart, Contrary"; Transliteration: "Koko, Kokoro, Urahara" (Japanese: 小恋、ココロ、うらはら)	December 10, 2007
The class continues to talk behind Minatu's back, and then Sakura suggests Minatu should stay over at her house for the time being. Koko begins to avoid Yoshiyuki. Maya still argues with Otome and Yoshiyuki, Minatu concludes how humans and robots coexist. Nanaka tries to comfort Koko.
12	"Bridge to the Heart"; Transliteration: "Kokoro no Kakehashi" (Japanese: 心の架け橋)	December 17, 2007
Koko thinks deeply about her relationship with Yoshiyuki. Minatsu saves Maya's little brother from a car crash; however, the incident proved Minatsu's identity. The class' attitude changes over Minatsu and acknowledges her, but the school board expels Minatsu from the school. Even Maya forgives Minatsu and reveals how she's abandoned her plans to take over the world. Upon hearing the news about Minatsu's expulsion, Yoshiyuki searches for Sakura where he bumps into Koko. She arrives with a decision and breaks up with him.
13	"Wish Upon the Sakura's Smile"; Transliteration: "Sakura Emi Kimi Omou" (Japanese: 桜笑み君想う)	December 24, 2007
Minatsu's expulsion is announced throughout the school. Yoshiyuki hears the students are protesting by not going to classes for her sake. Minatsu thanks everyone for their support through a broadcast with the help of Suginami and Nanaka. Yoshiyuki talks with Sakura on how things are doing okay now. Koko planned a graduation ceremony for Minatsu's goodbye. Yoshiyuki and the music band play with Nanaka's singing for everyone and Minatsu's happiness.

=== Da Capo II: Second Season ===
No.	Title	Original air date
1	"Like Deep Snow"; Transliteration: "Shinsetsu no Gotoku" (Japanese: 深雪の如く)	April 5, 2008
Winter is here and the sakura trees are still blooming. In Yoshiyuki's dream, the Asakura sisters are intimating with him in his bed until Sakura awakens him. The class votes on a Christmas class event. Anzu and Akane decide upon a puppet show, and Suginami chose a haunted house. Yoshiyuki breaks the tie by picking the puppet show with him and Koko as the lead characters. At home, the news reports of mysterious incidents occurring in Hatsune-Jima. Yoshiyuki practices the puppet show with Otome. That evening, Otome notices a change in the island's sakura trees. Sakura is shown at the magical sakura tree.
2	"Secret Room of Snow"; Transliteration: "Yuki no Misshitsu" (Japanese: 雪の密室)	April 12, 2008
Preparations for the Christmas party are still going; Yume seems to be showing some affection towards Yoshiyuki. Anzu Yukimura collapses in the classroom due to a fever, Yoshiyuki takes her home where Anzu reveals how she was abandoned by her parents, adopted by her grandmother who died when Anzu recently enrolled in school, and has been living by herself for the past three years. Yoshiyuki remembers how he was taken to the Asakura household with Sakura. The next day, everyone goes to Anzu's house to study. Anzu displays her memorizing power. Later, Yume meets with Yoshiyuki in town who wants to ask him to go with her, and Otome believes she should do something justice.
3	"Magic User of Justice"; Transliteration: "Seigi no Mahōtsukai" (Japanese: 正義の魔法使い)	April 19, 2008
Yoshiyuki continues to practice for the puppet show with Otome. She invites him over at her house with Yume for dinner since Yoshiyuki hasn't been there recently. Grandpa Jun'ichi is revealed there, and they see the news reporting many unknown fires. Otome shows Yoshiyuki an album when they were little. The next day, Yoshiyuki remembers how he learned the spell for summoning Japanese sweets by Jun'ichi for people happiness. He also remembered a promise he made to Otome as a child, and Otome reveals that she is able to perform magic as well.
4	"The Shape of Happiness"; Transliteration: "Shiawase no Katachi" (Japanese: 幸せの形)	April 26, 2008
The day of the Christmas Party has arrived at Kazumi Academy and Yume still hasn't asked Yoshiyuki if he wants to go with her. Yoshiyuki instead asks her if she's going with anyone, and Yume accepts him and have fun together. Unfortunately, Koko faints before the puppet show starts. Yoshiyuki requests Otome to fill the role of Koko in the play since she has the lines memorized with "one heart and one soul". The episode ended with the play being successful.
5	"Snow Field of Despair"; Transliteration: "Shitsubō no Setsugen" (Japanese: 失望の雪原)	May 3, 2008
The group has planned a ski trip. Yume seems to be avoiding everyone while the rest have fun in the snow. That night, Yume goes skiing by herself and Yoshiyuki follows her. Yume falls off course and injures herself. Yoshiyuki saves her, and she reveals that she had a dream where she gets into an accident along with Yoshiyuki on the ski trip. They go back to the hotel where everyone is staying with a smile. Yoshiyuki is wearing the pendant again.
6	"Cherry Blossom Mystery"; Transliteration: "Sakura Meikyū" (Japanese: 桜迷宮)	May 10, 2008
Otome and Yoshiyuki have started investigation on the incidents that have been occurring throughout Hatsune-Jima. Otome feels that the arsons, collapsing streets are all linked to something. Suginami gathers old articles for Yoshiyuki of legends that occurred in the past on the island. They turn to Jun'ichi who tells events from the old days 50 years ago. Jun'ichi then asks them if they realize that the sakura trees on the island weren't always in bloom, and tells them the story behind the wish granting. Yoshiyuki and Otome then bump into Anzu who reveals a story about a "girl" who gained a powerful memory from the wish granting cherry blossom tree. Later, they try making a wish at the cherry blossom tree before heading home to feed a hungry Yume.
7	"Unchanging Dream"; Transliteration: "Kaerarenai Yume" (Japanese: 変えられない夢)	May 17, 2008
Sakura offers the family a small dinner party, the Asakura sisters become drunk. They later go to celebrate New Year's. The next day, Yume tries to cook better for Yoshiyuki then cuts herself and he puts saliva on her finger to heal. As Otome and Yoshiyuki continue their investigation, Yume asked him to come home early. They find a lead about a blond girl appearing at each incident that occurs on the island. Yoshiyuki realize that it is Yume's birthday and after buying her a gift, he gets locked inside the shopping mall because of security malfunctioning until he becomes late. This fulfills the dream Yume had the night before where she spends her birthday alone. Meanwhile, Otome witnesses another accident where she discovered Sakura there.
8	""Sakuranbo" and Older Brother"; Transliteration: "Sakuranbo to oniichan" (Japanese: さくらんぼとお兄ちゃん)	May 24, 2008
While Sakura is trying to suppress the stubborn power of the cherry blossom tree, Jun'ichi arrives to cheer her up. Yoshiyuki apologizes to Yume after having a farewell dream about her. While investigating the cherry blossom tree, Sakura ends up saving Yoshiyuki and Yume from a traffic accident. Otome later learns Sakura's magic abilities and how she plans to put an end to the cherry blossom tree's power for granting not only good wishes, but bad ones too; which explains the numerous occurring incidents since she's at her limit. However, Sakura reveals she won't wither the cherry blossom tree, because if she does, Yoshiyuki will disappear. She has Jun'ichi cut her hair short as she plans to fuse with the cherry blossom tree to control it from within.
9	"Broken Spring"; Transliteration: "Koware yuku haru" (Japanese: 壊れゆく春)	May 31, 2008
Sakura's plan fails as the cherry tree continues to bloom. The next morning, Yoshiyuki almost got run over by Maika's car when greeting Koko across the road. Otome believes that she has to do something about the cherry blossom tree and she begins to avoid Yoshiyuki. When coming home out in the rain she tells Jun'ichi how much she cares for Yoshiyuki. Jun'ichi relieves Otome, that he will take care of it. He decides to fuse with the sakura tree as well, but still unable to end the cherry blossom tree's wish fulfilling power.
10	"The Ending Dream"; Transliteration: "Yume no Owari" (Japanese: 夢の終わり)	June 7, 2008
Otome keeps distance from Yoshiyuki as she continues her research on the cherry blossom tree. As Yoshiyuki searches for her until nightfall, he learns from Yume about Jun'ichi's absence. Afterwards, he falls asleep. In a dream world, Sakura reveals to him how she was studying the mystery on magical sakura trees in America, but as time passed, all the people she knew in Hatsune-Jima have moved on with their lives, and thus she suffer in loneliness. To endure her loneliness she wished for a family and the artificial cherry blossom tree that she created fulfilled the wish by giving her Yoshiyuki as a son. He calls Sakura "Mom" for the first time. Yoshiyuki confesses to Otome that he had lived happily, convinces that she should use her magic ability to wither the cherry blossom tree, and finally succeeds. Yume witness the scene in the end.
11	"Withered Coloured Island"; Transliteration: "Kareiro no Shima" (Japanese: 枯色の島)	June 14, 2008
The commotion of the withered cherry blossom tree becomes the top news for the islanders. Yoshiyuki starts to realize the consequences of the cherry blossom tree losing its powers (Anzu has lost her memorizing power). Otome continues to avoid Yoshiyuki since she stopped the cherry blossom tree's power, and that his existence is deliberately being erased from everyone's memories. Nanaka recognizes Yoshiyuki for a brief time, along with the others. Yume cooks for Yoshiyuki to get his hopes up. Then finally, he leaves Kazami Academy when all his friends soon fail to recognize him.
12	"The Depths of Recollection"; Transliteration: "Kioku no Fuchi" (Japanese: 記憶の淵)	June 21, 2008
Yume and Otome are now the only ones who remember Yoshiyuki. He looks at an album when Yume comes in and request him to take her on a date. On the way to school their friends can't see Yoshiyuki. They both skip school to go on the date. At the end of the day as they go to the rooftop of the school, Yume reveals her ability to see the future. She also confesses her love for Yoshiyuki and bids him goodbye in tears. Afterwards, she urges him to go see Otome. Yoshiyuki finds Otome at the dead cherry blossom tree, where his existence is finally removed from the island and disappears in front of her. He leaves Otome crying after confessing her love too.
13	"Season Returning Back"; Transliteration: "Megurikuru Kisetsu" (Japanese: 巡りくる季節)	June 28, 2008
Two months have passed since Yoshiyuki has disappeared from the memories of everyone on the island. As the new school semester starts, Otome and Yume feel depress with Yoshiyuki no longer by their side. Sakura flies over the island in an astral state. All of the friends slowly begin to recall something important missing. While visiting the dead cherry blossom tree, Otome breaks down and cries. With Sakura seeing this, she begs the cherry blossom tree to return Yoshiyuki to the island. As Otome's cries, Yoshiyuki approaches her, and Yume comes running after having dreamt of him. The cherry blossom tree then disappears from Hatsune.
