= List of Tokyo Majin episodes =

Tokyo Majin is a Japanese anime series, which premiered in Japan on the anime satellite TV network Animax. A large part of the Tokyo Majin Gakuen franchise, it is loosely based on a series of Japan-only video games, and is directed by Shinji Ishihira. The first season, Tokyo Majin Gakuen: Kenpuchō Tō (東京魔人學園剣風帖 龖; lit., "Tokyo Demon Academy: The Book of Weapons - The Ascension") originally aired on January 19, 2007, and ended on April 20, 2007. All of the episodes in the season are called the 'Dark Arts Chapters' (外法編 Gehou-hen). A second season, titled Tokyo Majin Gakuen: Kenpuchō Tō Dainimaku (東京魔人學園剣風帖 龖 第弐幕; lit., "Tokyo Demon Academy: The Book of Weapons - The Ascension 2nd Stage") originally aired on July 27, 2007, to October 12, 2007. Its first five episodes are called the 'Martial Fist Chapters' (拳武編 Kenbu-hen), its next five episodes are called the 'Stars of Fate Chapters' (宿星編 Shukusei-hen), and the last two episodes are called 'Extra Chapters' (番外編 Bangai-hen). The 'Extra' episodes do not run in the chronological timeline of the story, but are flashbacks and fillers.

Funimation published the DVDs in 2 boxsets. The First boxset Tokyo Majin-Part One, Dark Arts Chapters. The Second boxset Tokyo Majin-Part Two, Martial Fist Chapters, which showed the two story arcs and two extras. American television network Chiller began airing the series as part of their Anime Wednesdays block on July 15, 2015.

== Episode list ==
=== Season 1 ===
No. in season	DVD English Title	Original release date	English air date (Note: Date first screened in the USA by American television network Chiller)
Dark Arts Chapters
1	"First Night: Moment of the Demonic Encounter"; Transliteration: "Ōmagadoki" (Japanese: 逢魔ヶ刻)	January 19, 2007	15 July 2015
Tokyo is threatened by living corpses called the "Reborn Dead" which attack and kill people who then become one of them. Meanwhile, students Tatsuma Hiyuu and Kyouichi Horaiji at the Magami Academy, beat off bullies from Sumida school who regularly prey on students at their school. At night, Tatsuma and Kyouichi, along with fellow students Aoi Misato, Komaki Sakurai and Yuuya Daigo try to solve the mystery of the Reborn Dead attacks. One night they meet old man Yang who has knowledge of Taoism, but before they arrive, Yang and his group are attacked by the Reborn Dead. With information from Kyoko Touno, the Tatsuma group arrive at the site of the next attack, which is controlled by a demon. They follow it to its underground lair and manage to destroy it. Meanwhile a group of priests called the Kujakushi fight the demons Marie Claire and Tendo Kodzunu.
2	"Second Night: Encounter with Lamentation Beneath the Cherry Blossoms"; Transliteration: "Sakura-ka shunen no sōgū" (Japanese: 桜下春怨の遭遇)	January 26, 2007	22 July 2015
In a flashback, Tatsuma Hiyuu is transferred to the Magami Academy and is challenged by the school delinquent Kyouichi Horaiji. After a short, evenly matched fight, they acknowledge each other's ability. Meanwhile, one of the "ten sacred treasures" is stolen from a temple. Fellow student Yuuya Daigo challenges Tatsuma to a match in an abandoned building, but when Aoi and Komaki try to stop the bout they are interrupted by a faceless female Moryo demon which attacks them. Fortunately, they are rescued by Hisui Kisaragi who destroys the demon.
3	"Third Night: Inhuman Powers"; Transliteration: "Hito narazaru chikara" (Japanese: 人ならざる力)	February 2, 2007	29 July 2015
Tendo Kodzunu approaches Ryouichi Karasu, the angry young guitarist from the disbanded band, Crow. Karasu feels rejected and Kodzunu offers to make him a demon with the power to destroy those who cannot accept his music. Hisui Kisaragi explains to the group after the demon attack that he is a demon fighter, and that there is a disturbance in the "Dragon Stream" which flows through the earth. Later, people in the city are violently attacked by flock of crows. While investigating, the group encounters Raito Umon wielding an electrified melee spear searching for Karasu. He defeats them except for Aoi who holds back, but stops him by unleashing a blast of power which the others did not know she possessed.
4	"Fourth Night: The Gathering"; Transliteration: "Tsudoe monodomo" (Japanese: 集えものども)	February 9, 2007	5 August 2015
The group realizes that Raito is not controlling the crows, but instead it is his former friend and band member, Karasu. They all go in search of Karasu, but Raito tries to reason with him without success. Karasu attacks Raito, but during the fight, he is badly wounded. Karasu then transforms into a crow-like demon, but is still unable to defeat Raito and reverts to his human form. Aoi questions Karasu about how he became a demon, but before he can reply, Tendo kills him.
5	"Fifth Night: Dream Hell"; Transliteration: "Yume jigoku" (Japanese: 夢地獄)	February 16, 2007	12 August 2015
School students begin collapsing in the city but the cause is not known. Komaki leaves the group, frustrated at what she sees as Aoi's futile effort to fight demons. At the same time. Hisui Kisaragi discovers that five small Buddhist shrines built to ward off demons have been desecrated. Meanwhile, school reporter Kyoko Touno refuses to leave her room after witnessing the battle between the group and Raito. At school, Komaki accuses Aoi of dumping her for Touno, but Aoi suddenly collapses. Inugami recommends she be taken to Sakuragaoka Central Hospital to be seen by Doctor Takako Iwayama.
6	"Sixth Night: Living Hell"; Transliteration: "Ikijigoku" (Japanese: 生地獄)	February 23, 2007	19 August 2015
Doctor Takako Iwayama diagnoses that Aoi has had her consciousness imprisoned and is in danger of dying. Nurse Maiko Takamizawa sees a puppy spirit that seems to be following Aoi. Touno arrives at the hospital and claims to know the identity of the person behind the collapsing students - Reiji Sagaya, who was the victim of bullies from Kagura Middle School who also killed his puppy. The group track Sagaya down, but using demonic powers provided by Tendo Kodzunu, Sagaya transports them into a dream world where his teddy bear monsters attack them. However, Aoi appears to him and convinces him to abandon his vendetta, thus frustrating Kodzunu who sees another one of his demonic puppets fail.
7	"Seventh Night: The Demoniacal Horde"; Transliteration: "Kidōshū" (Japanese: 鬼道衆)	March 2, 2007	26 August 2015
As Kisaragi recovers from his wounds from fighting Reiji Sagaya, both he and Aoi separately recall their time as children in the Misato household. Kisaragi explains to the group that the disturbances are not cause by the Dragon Stream, but by someone from the Kodzunu clan who is using the Dark Arts to revive the Demoniacal Horde. He offers to fight them himself, but the members of the group all volunteer to fight with him. They proceed to a cavern which is under the sacred grounds of the Kasaragi family where they encounter Tendo Kodzunu and Marie Claire. Kodzunu easily defeats them using Demoniacal Arts, however Tatsuma fights back, withdrawing the Eight Hands Breath Sword he has kept hidden which is also one of the "ten sacred treasures". However, when Marie Claire's dress is damaged during their fight, she unleashes her power and expels the group from the cavern.
8	"Eighth Night: The Hole Lady"; Transliteration: "Ana no onna" (Japanese: 穴の女)	March 9, 2007	2 September 2015
The police investigate a series of bizarre killings in which the right arms of the victims have been torn off. Meanwhile the group encounters Daigo's old teacher, Ryuuzan Arai. Later, at the Magami Academy archery tournament, the possessed student who has been responsible for the killings, appears and targets Komaki. The girl becomes a wasp-like demon with the ability to create holes in buildings and people, and the others race to Komaki's aid. Kodzunu appears and attacks Tatsuma, demanding to know his identity and what is the source of his power. Daigo and Komaki combine to defeat the demon who is revealed to be an old schoolmate of Komaki who injured her arm and could no longer compete at archery. Rather than accept Aoi's sympathy, the girl climbs the railing and falls to her death from the rooftop.
9	"Ninth Night: Gently & Furiously"; Transliteration: "Hageshisa to yasashisa de" (Japanese: 激しさと優しさで)	March 16, 2007	9 September 2015
Komaki grieves for her schoolmate's death and breaks down, but Kyouichi helps her regain her composure and confidence. Meanwhile, Tatsuma visits Misato who reveals the scar on her back which she received when she tried to save a friend in a school fire. This led to her strong feelings of empathy towards others. In return, Tatsuma reveals to her the birthmark on his hand which made him seem different to others who bullied him. Later, the group, assisted now by a revived Komaki, tackle a demon creating chaos in the city. She was a young missing schoolgirl, Sera Rikudou, and collapses after using all her power to combat the group. Aoi goes to her aid and revives her, which reveals to Kodzunu that she possesses the Bodhisattva Eye.
10	"Tenth Night: Bodhisattva Eye"; Transliteration: "Bosatsugan" (Japanese: 菩薩眼)	March 23, 2007	16 September 2015
A month later, demon activity has subsided so the group have little to do. Anko reveals to the others that Tatsuma has been seeing Sayo Hirasaka from Shinagawa whose parents died in the crow incident. Kisaragi also deduces that Aoi possesses the Bodhisattva Eye. Meanwhile, Kodzunu approaches Aoi and offers to help her exploit the Bodhisattva Eye, but she refuses. Kyouichi visits Kisaragi and realizes that he plans to kill Aoi in order to prevent the Bodhisattva Eye being controlled by Kodzunu. Kyouichi tries to stop him, but Aoi overhears their argument and decides to end her own life. Meanwhile, Tatsuma accompanies Sayo to the railway station as she prepares to leave the city.
11	"Eleventh Night: Scattered Blossoms, Divergent Lives"; Transliteration: "Sanka ribetsu suru inochi" (Japanese: 散花離別する命)	March 30, 2007	23 September 2015
Tatsuma travels with Sayo into the countryside, and eventually they arrive at her uncle's farm. However, when Tatsuma steps inside the house, he finds it is a trap set by Kodzunu who reveals that Sayo died some time ago and is now a corpse demon. Meanwhile, while following Tatsuma, Kisaragi, Daigo and Komaki encounter Aoi who has activated the Bodhisattva Eye and she attacks them. Kodzunu simultaneously attacks Tatsuma and realizes that he is a descendant of those he holds responsible for the destruction of the Kodzunu clan and prepares to kill him. However, Sayo intervenes and sacrifices herself to save Tatsuma. Kodzunu and Tatsuma resume their battle, while, Raito Umon appears and takes on Aoi and Marie Claire. They are then assisted by the sisters, Yukino and Hinano Oribe, and they all escape together.
12	"Twelfth Night: Revival of the Kodzunu"; Transliteration: "Kozunu fukkō" (九角復興)	April 6, 2007	30 September 2015
Tatsuma recovers from his battle with Kodzunu at Sakuragaoka Cantral Hospital and his friends gather around him. Ryuuzan Arai and the Oribe sisters also arrive and Kisaragi explains that Aoi possesses the Bodhisattva Eye and is being controlled by Kodzunu. Arai then tells the story of how it all began - The Kodzunu clan rebelled against the Shogunate after it tried to kidnap one of their daughters who had been born with the Bodhisattva Eye, but were decimated and went into hiding. Meanwhile, Kodzunu casts a spell using Aoi and the Bodhisattva Eye to create demons from the departed spirits of the Kodzunu clan.
13	"Thirteenth Night: Valley of the Dark Arts"; Transliteration: "Gehō no tani" (Japanese: 外法の谷)	April 13, 2007	7 October 2015
Partially recovered from his injuries, Tatsuma leads his friends to confront Kodzunu and his demons and hopes to save Aoi, leaving Kyouichi's gang protect those left at the hospital. A fierce battle ensues, and Tatsuma tries to break Kodzunu's control over Aoi even after she stabs him. He finally breaks Kodzunu's spell and Aoi recovers then helps Tatsuma's friends defeat the demons. Daigo severs Kodzunu's hand with his own blade leaving him almost defenceless, however, Kodzunu refuses to admit defeat so Kodzunu's clan to take him into the underworld, all watched from afar by Munetaka Yagyuu.
14	"Fourteenth Night: Falling Star"; Transliteration: "Ochiru hoshi" (Japanese: 堕ちる星)	April 20, 2007	14 October 2015
Two weeks after the battle with Kodzunu which rocked the city, life returns to normal. Arai explains that Kodzunu's clan took him because he had disturbed their eternal sleep, however his hand which was left behind does not decay. Meanwhile, Kisaragi returns after sealing away the "ten sacred treasures". Suddenly, Kodzunu, reappears at the temple, but this time he transforms into a grotesque demon himself. The group unsuccessfully try to stop the demon and Aoi even tries to stop him herself. Kisaragi intercedes, but he is fatally wounded so Aoi uses her powers to restore him. Tatsuma and Kyouichi go on to finally defeat the Kodzunu demon. Afterwards, Arai says that he suspects the demon was created by someone with considerable power in the Dark Arts.

=== Season 2 ===
No. in season.	DVD English Title	Original release date
Part 1: Martial Fist Chapters
1	"First Night: The Twelve Generals of the Martial Fist"; Transliteration: "Kenbu hen "Kenbu jūnishinshō"" (Japanese: 拳武編 「拳武十二神将」)	July 27, 2007
Koni Fernandez, Priest of the Rain Stars of the Twenty-Eight Constellations of Kanto, is approached by Yoriki Taise, one of the Twelve Heavenly Generals of the Martial Fist. Taise plans to take his life, however Koni only just survives and informs Hisui Kisaragi. At that moment, Biko Rokuji, another of the Twelve Generals appears in Kisaragi's antique shop. Meanwhile, Aoi, Ryuuzan Arai and the Oribe sisters are also attacked by members of the Martial Fist, but manage to defeat their attackers. Elsewhere, General Renji Magatsu prepares to attack Daigo and General Ukon Yatsurugi intercepts Kyouichi Horaiji. Daigo decides to escape, but Kyouichi chooses to fight. Kyouichi is no match for Yatsurugi and is mortally wounded by his sword. Lastly, on his way home, Tatsuma is approached by Mibu Kureha, another of the Twelve Generals.
2	"Second Night: Purgatorial Hell"; Transliteration: "Kenbu hen "Rengoku suru hōkō"" (Japanese: 拳武編「煉獄する咆哮」)	August 3, 2007
The confrontations between the Magami and the Martial Fist continue and Ryuuzan Arai, but the Oribe sisters defeat their attackers. However, the powerful Renji Magatsu turns Komaki into stone and defeats Daigo. Elsewhere, Tatsuma and Kureha appear to be evenly matched, but after Kureha detects no malice in Tatsuma he breaks off their fight. As the Magami survivors regroup, Doshin Narasaki arrives and announces that Ryuzan has appointed him as their new leader. Doshin leads them to a sanctuary where Ryuzan explains that the people murdered in the city were members of the Twenty-Eight Constellations of Kanto, and they have been killed by trained assassins of the Martial Fist, although their motive is unclear. Meanwhile, Daigo regains consciousness and transforms himself into Byakko, the Vessel of the White Tiger. He engages in a titanic battle with Magatsu and defeats him, returning Komaki to normal. Meanwhile, Master Miroku recovers the wounded Kyouichi and takes him to safety.
3	"Third Night: Let's Change Ourselves From the Inside"; Transliteration: "Kenbu hen "Kokorokara kawarō"" (Japanese: 拳武編「心から変わろう」)	August 10, 2007
A flashback show details of Daigo's past and how his best friend, Magatsu, turned against him when he did not support Magatsu after he killed his overbearing father. Doshin describes the existence of the Golden Dragon, whose power can only be invoked by the four guardians, Seiryuu, Suzaku, Genbu and Byakko. Kyouichi regains consciousness and immediately seeks vengeance against Yatsurugi, but instead Master Miroku gives him a length of timber to begin carving a new sword. The enemy of the Magami grougp finds their sanctuary and begins his attack. Daigo again transforms into Byakko, but Komaki fires an arrow into him, hoping to prevent him from becoming a demon. Meanwhile, Kyouichi arrives with a new sword carved from the length of timber and challenges Yatsurugi with renewed conviction sense of purpose.
4	"Fourth Night: The Fist Does Not Take Lives"; Transliteration: "Kenbu hen "Ken wa inochi o ubawanai"" (Japanese: 拳武編「拳は命を奪わない」)	August 17, 2007
Kyouichi confronts Yatsurugi who realizes that he can no longer predict Kyouichi's movements and surrenders without drawing his sword. Yatsurugi then helps the Magami group defeat a hoard of minor demons attacking the city. Meanwhile, Tatsuma and Kureha continue to fight, but Aoi intervenes and casts doubt on Kureha's unquestioning loyalty to his Director, Master Naturaki. The Director casts an Onmyo spell, forcing the Magami group to fight among themselves. In retaliation, Doctor Takako Iwayama produces the vajra pestle of the Urakouya exorcists and begins an incantation to test the enemy's spiritual field. Meanwhile, the Director takes matters into his own hands, attacking Kureha when he refuses to kill Tatsuma. However, as he gains the upper hand, he is suddenly attacked by the real Director, Naturaki, and retreats.
5	"Fifth Night: The Protecting Fist"; Transliteration: "Kenbu hen "Mamoru Ken"" (Japanese: 拳武編「護る拳」)	August 24, 2007
Director Naturaki reveals that the man who took his place, and ordered the killings by the unsuspecting Martial Fist, is Munetaka Yagyu. Many years ago, he was sealed away by Ryuzan, Doshin and Director Naturaki, but he had broken the seal and escaped, seeking vengeance against the Stars of Fate, comprising the Magami group and their mentors. Later, the Magami group and Kureha realize that they must accept the consequences of the events which have taken place and the new situation in which they now find themselves.
Part 2: Stars of Fate Chapters
6	"Sixth Night: Story of Byakko - A Mirthless Christmas Eve"; Transliteration: "Shukusei hen Byakko no shō "Seiya wa hohoemanai"" (Japanese: 宿星編 白虎之章「聖夜は微笑まない」)	August 31, 2007
At Christmas time, someone is causing people to commit murders in the name of "chaos" through a mobile phone game which also causes mysterious hand-prints to appear on their bodies. Tatsuma's foster parents are targeted and killed when they come to visit him in Tokyo. He is devastated and inconsolable, and goes in search of Chaos alone. Meanwhile, at the Sakuragaoka Central Hospital, Sagaya explains to the Magami group that the perpetrator was almost recruited by the Chaos creator calling himself Dark Charisma. Tatsuma arrives at the Sarang Hae club looking for Chaos, but is intercepted by Kyouichi who tries to stop him. They begin fighting, but are stopped by the intervention of Aoi.
7	"Seventh Night: Story of Genbu - Chaos"; Transliteration: "Shukusei hen Genbu no shō "Kaosu"" (Japanese: 宿星編 玄武之章「渦王須」)	September 7, 2007
The Magami students suspect that Tatsuma has one of the Four Guardian's powers but he may not be able to control it so they decide to split up to search for him. Meanwhile, Tatsuma has visions of Chaos which lead him to a church. The group track Tatsuma to the church where they are all greeted by Ryuji Yashiro sitting in a wheelchair who claims he is Chaos. Ryuji explains that he had Tatsuma's parents murdered to awaken his latent power and Ryuji challenges Tatsuma to kill him. However, Tatsuma cannot bring himself to do it.
8	"Eighth Night: Story of Suzaku - Destruction Day"; Transliteration: "Shukusei hen Suzaku no shō "Metsunichi"" (Japanese: 宿星編 朱雀之章「滅日」)	September 14, 2007
Tatsuma keeps Ryuji close to him and follows a normal daily routine although his friends still mustrust Ryuji. Tatsuma takes Ryuji to the morgue where he is shown the bodies of people who died because of Chaos, and then takes him on a tour of the sites where people were killed. One night, Detective Mikuriya approaches Maria Alucard and provides proof that the real Maria Alucard died twenty years earlier. Ryuta also arrives and as Alucard transforms into a monster, he shoots and badly damages her. However Inugami Morihito arrives to save her and officer Mikuriya decides it is best to withdraw. When Ryuta tries to shoot the Inugami, he savagely attacks officer Mikuriya, leaving Ryuta distraught. Meanwhile, Tatsuma finally manages to make Ryuji angry, and as he does, Munetaka Yagyuu appears above them and draws in Ryuji's power.
9	"Ninth Night: Story of Seiryu - Gathering Stars of Fate"; Transliteration: "Shukusei hen Seiryuu no shō "Tsudou Shukusei"" (Japanese: 宿星編 青竜之章「集う宿星」)	September 21, 2007
Following massive destruction in the city by Yagyuu, many people are dead, and Rikudo Sera dies protecting homeless people on the riverbank. Ryuuzan Arai predicts that Yagyuu intends to absorb Ryuji's power when he becomes the vessel of the Golden Dragon after the four guardians, Seiryuu, Suzaku, Genbu and Byakko have been awakened. He asserts that Ryuji is the vessel of Ying and Tatsuma is the vessel of Yang. He believes that Yagyuu conspired to bring them together. As the Magami students prepare for the final showdown with Yagyuu, Master Miroku arrives with weapons and Kureha Mibu with members of the Martial Fist to assist. They seek out Yagyuu, but he is prepared, and their attacks are deflected back against them, falling one by one. Tatsuma manages to assemble the four guardians, but that is still not enough to defeat Yagyuu. Then Aoi uses her Bodhisattva Eye to heal everyone and Tatsuma makes a final assault on Yagyuu and breaks his control over Ryuji.
10	"Tenth Night: Story of the Golden Dragon - Cherry Blossoms That Do Not Fall"; Transliteration: "Shukusei hen Kōryū no shō "Chiranai sakura"" (Japanese: 第拾夜 宿星編 黄龍之章「散らない桜」)	September 28, 2007
In the aftermath of the battle with Yagyuu everyone is reunited, although many have lost family members and friends during the recent events. The city slowly recovers, but Tatsuma is missing. Alucard recovers and tells Morihito that she came to Japan on a false identity, attracted by the Dragon Stream. Director Naturaki disbands the Martial Fist, allowing them to go their own ways. Kyouichi believes that Tatsuma is in China, on the trail of Yagyuu, and tells Aoi that he will follow him alone, bidding her farewell. He later encounters Kisaragi and they leave together. Eventually the school graduation ceremony takes place, presided over by Maria Alucard.
Part 3: Extra Chapters
11	"Eleventh Night: Walk Onward, Children"; Transliteration: "Bangai hen "Ayume ko ra yo"" (Japanese: 番外編「歩め子らよ」)	October 5, 2007
A flashback shows Kyouichi's early years, his father's death by a was killed by a local gang in the streets, taking up his father's bokuto, and taking revenge against the assailants. This almost gets him killed but he is saved by Kyoshiro Kamui who took him to stay at Club Diva and trained him to use his wooden sword. Later, Kyouichi comes up against a gang run by Magatsu and Daigo, who he finds is as tough and stubborn as he is. Kamui eventually teaches Kyouichi that revenge for the past is holding back his development. Kyouichi challenges him with a real sword, but Kamui defeats the boy with just a cloth sheath. Then, as mysteriously as he appeared, Kamui disappeared, leaving only the purple cloth sheath for Kyouichi. There are also flashbacks to the youth of Tendou Kodzunu, Hisui Kisaragi, Aoi Misato, Komaki Sakurai, Reiji Sagaya, Touno Kyouko, Yuuya Daigo and Renji Magatsu, and their arrival at the Magami Academy and when they first meet Tatsuma Hiyuu.
12	"Twelfth Night: Romeo & Juliet"; Transliteration: "Bangai hen "Arigatō"" (Japanese: 番外編「ありがとう」)	October 12, 2007
Ten days after the Martial Fist incident, students at the Magami Academy begin rehearsals the Shakespeare play Romeo and Juliet to be performed at the graduation ceremony. However, it is the Touno Kyouko version which includes elements from Twelfth Night. The activity gives the students an opportunity to spend some time relaxing together before they graduate.
