= List of Den-noh Coil episodes =

This is a list of episodes for the Japanese anime television series Den-noh Coil. It aired in Japan between 12 May and 1 December 2007, containing twenty-six episodes.

== Episode list ==
No.	Title	Directed by	Written by	Original release date
1	"The Kids With Glasses"; Transliteration: "Megane no Kodomotachi" (Japanese: メガネの子供たち)	Masaru Yasukawa	Mitsuo Iso	12 May 2007
Yūko Okonogi (nicknamed Yasako) and her younger sister Kyōko arrive by train to Daikoku City. Their virtual pet dog Densuke goes missing when he falls into an abandoned zone of cyberspace occupied by an illegal. Yasako enlists the aid of Fumie Hashimoto, a detective from the Coil Cyberinvestigation Agency, to help rescue her pet. Thanks to their efforts, they attract the attention of Searchmaton. Opening narration: According to rumors among the other kids, pets have been disappearing one after another in Daikoku City recently.
2	"Coil Cyberinvestigation Agency"; Transliteration: "Koiru Dennō Tantei Kyoku" (Japanese: コイル電脳探偵局)	Masaru Yasukawa	Mitsuo Iso	19 May 2007
Yasako and Fumie ask Yasako's grandmother, Megabaa, to cure Densuke of a deadly illness. Yasako also agrees to join Megabaa's Detective Agency as their eighth member. Meanwhile, Yūko Amasawa (nicknamed Isako) searches for the "Keyhole". Deducing that it resides as an illegal in Densuke, she unleashes her virtual pets to capture him. Opening narration: According to urban legend, kids who call out to "Michiko" are spirited away to the "other side".
3	"Yūko and Yūko"; Transliteration: "Yūko to Yūko" (Japanese: 優子と勇子)	Akitoshi Yokoyama	Mitsuo Iso	26 May 2007
Having captured Densuke, the Mojos deliver him to Isako. After separating the illegal from Densuke, Isako failed his attempt to "unlock" the organism with her key, causing nearby cyberspace to rupture. She reports the episode to a mysterious conspirator over the phone. Opening narration: According to rumors in the industry, there are some hidden functions in the glasses that are better left unmentioned.
4	"Daikoku City Hackers Club"; Transliteration: "Daikoku-shi Heikū Kurabu" (Japanese: 大黒市黒客クラブ)	Masaru Yasukawa	Mitsuo Iso	2 June 2007
A cyber battle frenzy breaks out at school between Isako, Fumie, and Daichi Sawaguchi's group, the Daikoku Hackers' Club. While Isako is the ultimate victor with Daichi's group completely subdued, Fumie manages to steal a piece of data from Amasawa that is totally corrupted with exception of the word "Michiko". Opening narration: According to rumors on the Net, a few years ago, an Encoder tried to devastate the entire Space. However, nobody knows what happened to that Encoder.
5	"Metabug Scramble Bus Tour"; Transliteration: "Metabagu Sōdatsu Basu Tsuā" (Japanese: メタバグ争奪バスツアー)	Takahiro Ikezoe	Mitsuo Iso	9 June 2007
Isako leads the beaten and desperate Daikoku Hackers' Club on a metabug expedition over the fringes of Daikoku's cyberspace. During the expedition, Isako traps and assumes control of the Daikoku Hackers. Captivated by Isako's skill, Daichi asks to become her disciple. Opening narration: According to rumors on the Net, occasionally some metabugs have audio or image data stored on them. No one knows where this data comes from.
6	"The Red Automaton"; Transliteration: "Akai Ōtomaton" (Japanese: 赤いオートマトン)	Nobukage Kimura	Mitsuo Iso	16 June 2007
Yasako and Fumie begin an investigation into Kenichi Harakawa (nicknamed Haraken) and Searchmaton. They attempt to test and map out Searchmaton's behavioral patterns and programming. Under pressure, Haraken reveals to Yasako and Fumie his familial connections to the administrators of Searchmaton and his motive for investigating viruses and illegals. Opening narration: According to the newspapers, there's an increasing rate of traffic accidents involving kids wearing glasses.
7	"Move Out!! Coil Investigation Agency"; Transliteration: "Shutsudō!! Koiru Tantei Kyoku" (Japanese: 出動!!コイル探偵局)	Kazuo Nogami	Mitsuo Iso; Yūko Miyamura	23 June 2007
Isako once again summons the kirabug illegal with the help of the Daikoku Hackers. However her plans are inadvertently disrupted by the pet detectives Yasako and Fumie working on an unrelated case. Isako eventually chases the rogue virus to a corrupted space on the school grounds. Opening narration: According to rumors circulating among some people, if you keep thinking about someone you want to meet, you'll suddenly end up seeing them.
8	"The Summer Festival and the Duel"; Transliteration: "Natsumatsuri, soshite Hatashiai" (Japanese: 夏祭り、そして果たし合い)	Tarō Iwasaki	Mitsuo Iso	30 June 2007
Isako hatches a plan and asks Daichi to challenge the Coil detectives to a duel. Daichi, at the expense of his revived friendship with Fumie, reluctantly complies. Haraken recovers a mysterious metabug from his former research partner's lost pet. Opening narration: According to urban legends, kids that have fallen asleep with their glasses on have ended up going to the "other side".
9	"Michiko: From the Other Side"; Transliteration: "Atchi no Michiko-san" (Japanese: あっちのミチコさん)	Kazuo Nogami	Mitsuo Iso	7 July 2007
The kids spend a dark and stormy night at school telling ghost stories and playing spooky cyber games. Isako uses the distraction to capture a kirabug manifested in the form of Michiko inside the school. Meanwhile, Haraken is briefly whisked away to "the other side". Opening narration: According to rumors whispered among the kids, Michiko might actually be an illegal.
10	"Kanna's Diary"; Transliteration: "Kanna no Nikki" (Japanese: カンナの日記)	Tadashi Hiramatsu	Mitsuo Iso	14 July 2007
Haraken, Fumie, and Yasako follow clues left by Haraken's former research partner, Kanna Ashihara. Meanwhile, Daichi is ejected from Isako's group due to his failure to defeat Fumie in a duel. Opening narration: According to rumors on the Net, long before glasses ever hit the market, Nakatsu Intersection was a mysterious place―the site of many accidents.
11	"Submerged in Daikoku City!"; Transliteration: "Chinbotsu! Daikoku-shi" (Japanese: 沈没! 大黒市)	Kazuo Nogami; Tomoya Takahashi	Mitsuo Iso	21 July 2007
Daichi, in a plot to acquire metabugs, catches and raises a fish-type illegal as a virtual pet. He eventually loses control of it as it floods Daikoku City with digital water. Opening narration: According to certain statistics, if a sixth-grade male and female fight, the female has a higher probability of winning.
12	"Daichi's First Hair"; Transliteration: "Daichi, Hatsumō su" (Japanese: ダイチ、発毛ス)	Nobukage Kimura	Mitsuo Iso	28 July 2007
The protagonists find a race of microscopic illegals growing on their faces. Yasako, utilizing a communication device devised by Megabaa, becomes heavily engaged in a god game-like relationship with the developing civilization. She attempts to use her divine influence to save the war-mongering race before it crumbles from a nuclear holocaust. In the wake of devastation, the illegals set out to find their "homeland". Opening narration: According to rumors amongst the Whiskers, 5550 minutes after the beginning, Lady Yasako will take them to the promised land.
13	"The Last Plesiosaur"; Transliteration: "Saigo no Kubinagaryū" (Japanese: 最後の首長竜)	Kazuya Nomura	Mitsuo Iso	4 August 2007
The protagonists agree to aid Denpa in relocating a docile plesiosaur-type illegal, which he had previously been raising in an obsolete space now scheduled for reconstruction. The lonesome illegal, driven to find more of its kind, follows the children in a hazardous journey through the city. Opening narration: According to an old folk saying, humans all instinctively know the path they should follow.
14	"Chronicles of a Living Creature"; Transliteration: "Ikimono no Kiroku" (Japanese: いきものの記録)	Tomoya Takahashi	Mitsuo Iso	1 September 2007
Fumie's younger brother, Akira Hashimoto, recaps the story of the TV series from his perspective as a double-agent. Haraken is accosted by Sōsuke Nekome and is warned about investigating further. Opening narration: According to industry rumors, the reason the Micet series was taken off the market was to stop people from using them for secret photography and eavesdropping.
15	"The Boy on the Other Side of the Station"; Transliteration: "Eki Mukō no Shōnen" (Japanese: 駅向こうの少年)	Masaru Yasukawa	Mitsuo Iso; Yōichi Araki; Yōsuke Matsuzawa	8 September 2007
Yasako, attempting to find the place where she first met 4423, meets a boy named Takeru who guides her through the neighborhood. Deducing that the place from her memories was a virtual space deleted by Searchmaton, Yasako heads home as Takeru reports the day's events to a mysterious collaborator. Opening narration: According to rumors among the kids from the other side of the station, in the deepest part of obsolete Space lives a dangerous illegal.
16	"Isako's Hospital Room"; Transliteration: "Isako no Byōshitsu" (Japanese: イサコの病室)	Hironori Aoyagi	Mitsuo Iso; Yōsuke Matsuzawa; Masaaki Fukano	15 September 2007
For their research project, Haraken and Fumie find early records of cyber users who have passed out and reported hallucinations of "the other side". Meanwhile, Yasako spies on Isako as she visits her comatose brother. Deducing that he is 4423, Yasako confronts Isako with her realization that she has met her brother years ago. Opening narration: According to industry rumors, the first company that produced the glasses discovered a technique that allowed you to change things you imagined into cybermatter. But nobody knows what became of that.
17	"The Last Summer Vacation"; Transliteration: "Saigo no Natsu Yasumi" (Japanese: 最後の夏休み)	Kazuya Nomura	Mitsuo Iso; Yōichi Araki	22 September 2007
Haraken, tortured by the possibility that Kanna still exists in "the other side", asks Isako to take him there. Opening narration: What happens to people when they die? Where do their souls go? Nobody knows the truth.
18	"The Door to Another World"; Transliteration: "Ikai e no Tobira" (Japanese: 異界への扉)	Kazuo Nogami	Mitsuo Iso; Yōichi Araki	29 September 2007
Haraken catches a brief glimpse of Kanna before the collapse of Isako's gateway. Fearing for her nephew's life, Tamako Harakawa confiscates his glasses. Meanwhile, obsolete space begins to invade Megabaa's shop as Kyōko, Fumie and Yasako spend the night. Opening narration: According to rumors on the Net, the process of creating and developing the glasses was a complicated one involving the IP rights of many parties.
19	"The Black Visitors"; Transliteration: "Kuroi Hōmonsha" (Japanese: 黒い訪問者)	Nobukage Kimura	Mitsuo Iso; Yōsuke Matsuzawa	6 October 2007
After Kyōko is taken to the "other side", Yasako and Fumie evade the illegals and guide Kyōko's cyber body back to her real body with the help of Densuke. Opening narration: According to rumors among people in the know, there is a deep connection between Imago and cybertherapy.
20	"Kanna and Yasako"; Transliteration: "Kanna to Yasako" (Japanese: カンナとヤサコ)	Kazuo Nogami; Masaru Yasukawa	Mitsuo Iso; Yōsuke Matsuzawa	13 October 2007
With Kanna's glasses, Haraken sneaks out once again to the "other side" where he finally makes amends with a digital apparition of her. Yasako ventures in to the rescue with Isako and Tamako's help. It is revealed that Tamako was the first person to open the gate to the "other side", and the meaning of the show's title, Cyber Coil, is the phenomenon of the separation of one's cyber body from their physical body. Opening narration: According to my old memories, the first body prepared was an empty vessel devoid of life.
21	"The Black Automaton"; Transliteration: "Kuroi Ōtomaton" (Japanese: 黒いオートマトン)	Keiichi Sasajima	Mitsuo Iso; Yōichi Araki	20 October 2007
As First and Third elementary merge for classes on the top floor of a Megamass office building, Isako finds herself involved in a conspiracy by Megamass to research obsolete space and the effects of Cyber Coil. Opening narration: According to the histories of glasses development, in the past, many techniques for projection display tech were researched.
22	"The Last Coil"; Transliteration: "Saigo no Koiru" (Japanese: 最後のコイル)	Nobukage Kimura	Mitsuo Iso; Kōshirō Sanjō	27 October 2007
Yasako and Isako, on the run from Megamass and a powerful new searchmaton, take refuge in Megabaa's store. There, it is discovered that Densuke has the potential to open a stable portal to "the other side", now known as "Coil Domain". It is revealed that Coil Domain, Michiko, Imago and Kirabugs are remnants of an experiment gone awry, covered up by the Megamass conglomerate. Opening narration: According to industry rumors, Megamass wasn't able to remove the Imago function, so they reformatted some Space instead.
23	"The Granted Wish"; Transliteration: "Kanaerareta Negai" (Japanese: かなえられた願い)	Hironori Aoyagi	Mitsuo Iso; Kōshirō Sanjō	10 November 2007
Nekome, driven to reveal true nature and history of the cyber technology, tries to convince Isako to join her brother in Coil Domain using Densuke as a portal. Opening narration: The Nulls say that when they ate the seed of suffering, they came alive as creatures who sought more of it.
24	"The Kids Cast Their Glasses Away"; Transliteration: "Megane o Suteru Kodomotachi" (Japanese: メガネを捨てる子供たち)	Tomoya Takahashi	Mitsuo Iso; Yōsuke Matsuzawa	17 November 2007
Alarmed at what happened to Isako, the children's parents take away their glasses. Opening narration: According to Amasawa Yūko, the path that connects people's hearts is narrow and easily broken.
25	"Kanazawa City Window Crossing"; Transliteration: "Kanazawa-shi Hazama Kōsaten" (Japanese: 金沢市はざま交差点)	Kazuya Nomura	Mitsuo Iso; Yōsuke Matsuzawa	24 November 2007
Using the glasses that belonged to her deceased grandfather, Yasako travels to the other side to save Isako. Meanwhile, Megabaa finds out that they were mistaken on who 4423 really is. Opening narration: According to Coils internal documents, the Null Carrier started off as a radar device that collected pieces of souls.
26	"Yasako and Isako"; Transliteration: "Yasako to Isako" (Japanese: ヤサコとイサコ)	Masaru Yasukawa; Nobukage Kimura	Mitsuo Iso	1 December 2007
Yasako realizes the nature of Michiko, 4423, and the Coil Domain. Aided by her friends and family she must fight Michiko's grip on Isako and to avoid Nekome's desire to dispose of her consciousness. Opening narration: According to urban legends, after they die, cyberpets go live somewhere else.
