= List of The Story of Saiunkoku episodes =

The anime series The Story of Saiunkoku is based on the series of Japanese light novels written by Sai Yukino. Produced by Madhouse Studios and directed by Jun Shishido, the series premiered in Japan on NHK on April 8, 2006. The first season ran for 39 episodes until its conclusion on February 24, 2007. The series' second season, referred to as Saiunkoku Monogatari 2nd Series, premiered on April 7, 2007, and ran for another 39 episodes until its conclusion on March 8, 2008.

In May 2007, Geneon Entertainment announced it had acquired the licensed to releases the anime in North America with English language options. In September 2007, after only two volumes had been released, Geneon closed its North America operations. In July 2008, Funimation Entertainment announced that it will distribute several Geneon titles, including The Story of Saiunkoku.

The series uses three pieces of theme music. "Hajimari no kaze" by Ayaka Hirahara is used for the opening theme for both the first and second seasons. For the ending theme, "Saikou no Kataomoi" by Sachi Tainaka is used for the first season, while "Asu he" by Teruya Miho is used for the second season.

== Episode listing ==
=== Season 1 ===
No.	Title	Original release date
1	"Every Good Deal Has A Catch"; Transliteration: "Umai hanashi ni wa ura ga aru" (Japanese: うまい話には裏がある)	April 8, 2006
Shūrei Hong lives in Saiunkoku's Imperial City, Kiyo. A stunning young lady from the honorable Hong Clan, she makes a living by teaching children and struggles to make ends meet. One day, a high official from the Imperial court, Advisor Sho, arrives with a once-in-a-lifetime offer. Dazzled by the chance to be allowed in the Imperial compound and the high compensation rate, she readily accepted his offer and becomes a consort and tutor for the new Emperor of Saiunkoku.
2	"A Frog in the Well Knows Not About the Ocean"; Transliteration: "I no naka no kawazu taikai o shirazu" (Japanese: 井の中の蛙大海を知らず)	April 15, 2006
Shūrei enters the Royal Harem as the consort and person-in-charge of educating the new Emperor, Ryūki. As she spends the days with him, she has the inkling of an idea that he isn't the fool everyone makes him out to be. On the contrary, she feels that he may turn into a good king if given the right opportunity and education. After learning that Ryūki has never gone into the city, she secretly takes him out to the downtown area in order to show him the lives of the common people.
3	"The Capable Falcon Hides Its Talons"; Transliteration: "Nō Aru Taka wa Tsume o Kakusu" (Japanese: 能ある鷹は爪を隠す)	April 22, 2006
One month has passed since Shūrei became a royal consort. Ryūki kept his promise to Shūrei and gradually started to get involved with political affairs. One evening, out of the blue, Ryūki pays a visit to the Royal Harem carrying roses in his hand. Shūrei is flattered by this change of heart, but is taken aback when she realizes that Ryūki cut his hands up when he gathered the roses for her. She tends to his wounds and recounts the story of Rose Princess to her audience of one. In the meantime, an incident occurs during a royal banquet that threatens the peace of the entire kingdom, not to mention Shūrei's life!
4	"Treasure Buried Is Treasure Wasted"; Transliteration: "Sore wa takara no mochigusare" (Japanese: それは宝の持ち腐れ)	April 29, 2006
After participating in a swordfighting tournament, Ryūki discovers his exiled brother Seien is closer at hand than he previously believed.
5	"A Genius Can't Better A Hardworking Man"; Transliteration: "Doryoku ni masaru tensai nashi" (Japanese: 努力に勝る天才なし)	May 6, 2006
Shūrei meets Ryūren Ran, the eccentric brother of the General of the Shaorin Army.
6	"Lacking The Finishing Touch"; Transliteration: "Garyōtensei o Kaku" (Japanese: 画竜点睛を欠く)	May 13, 2006
Shūrei is kidnapped by forces who may or may not be working against the Emperor's interests.
7	"He Who Swims A Lot Will Drown"; Transliteration: "Yoku oyogu mono wa oboreru" (Japanese: よく泳ぐ者は溺れる)	May 20, 2006
The plot against Ryūki and Shūrei comes to a head as the conspirators are defeated. Ryūki realizes that the plot is deeper than he at first realized, and that those he deemed most trustworthy may not care about the same people he does. With her task complete, Shūrei leaves the palace, and Ryūki finally tells her that he likes women as much as men. He then kisses her in full view of the others, much to her angry chagrin.
8	"To Borrow A Cat's Paw"; Transliteration: "Neko no te mo karitai" (Japanese: 猫の手も借りたい)	May 27, 2006
Shūrei returns to her work at the temple school. Ryūki begins writing a proposal that would allow women to take the official examinations. Ensei Rō, one of Seiran's friends, arrives from Sa Province and becomes a friend of Shūrei.
9	"A Journey Of A Thousand Miles Begins With A Single Step"; Transliteration: "Senri no michi mo ippo kara" (Japanese: 千里の道も一歩から)	June 3, 2006
Shūrei disguises herself as a boy to assist the Imperial bureaucracy during a heat wave. She is assigned to the eccentric Minister of Taxation, who wears a mask at all times. The mystery around Ensei Rō deepens.
10	"Good Things Come To Those Who Wait"; Transliteration: "Mateba kairo no hiyori ari" (Japanese: 待てば海路の日和あり)	June 10, 2006
The reason bandits have been attacking Ensei Rō is revealed; while acting as temporary governor of Sa province, Ensei angered the local nobility by rejecting corruption and bribes. As he has not passed the official examination required to be a high official, Ensei returns his seal of governorship to Ryūki. Ryūki passes a law allowing women to take the official examinations.
11	"There's No Medicine For Lovesickness"; Transliteration: "Koi no yamai ni kusuri nashi" (Japanese: 恋の病に薬なし)	June 17, 2006
Seiran and the rest of the household watch over Shūrei after she catches a bad cold while chasing a troublesome student. Reishin Hong continues to conceal from Shūrei that he is her uncle. Reishin fears that if Shūrei knew his identity, she would hate him as the man who took her father's place as head of the Hong Clan. Meanwhile, Seiran, Ryūki, and the others search for the troublesome student, who has mysteriously disappeared.
12	"Escape Is a Win in Itself"; Transliteration: "Nigeru ga kachi" (Japanese: 逃げるが勝ち)	June 24, 2006
Shūrei comes to the aid of thirteen-year-old Eigetsu, who is attacked by bandits while visiting the imperial city to take the official examination. A local gang challenges the city's crimelords and Kochō, the madam of a brothel and Shūrei's longtime employer. It is revealed that Eigetsu turns into Yōgetsu when he drinks alcohol.
13	"From a Gourd Springs a Horse"; Transliteration: "Hyōtan kara Koma" (Japanese: 瓢箪から駒)	July 1, 2006
Ryūki earns the fealty of the local crimelords by resolving trouble with a gang who had been harassing examinees. Shūrei takes the imperial examination and passes with the third highest score.
14	"Three Years On A Rock"; Transliteration: "Ishi no ue ni mo sannen" (Japanese: 石の上にも三年)	July 8, 2006
After making a bad first impression Shūrei and Eigetsu are ordered to spend their first two months as imperial officials cleaning the lavatory and shining shoes.
15	"A Child Knows Not Of His Parents' Feelings"; Transliteration: "Oya no kokoro ko shirazu" (Japanese: 親の心子知らず)	July 15, 2006
Kōyū Ri ponders his course in life and his relationship with his foster father Reishin Hong, who took him in on an apparent whim.
16	"There Are No Demons In This World"; Transliteration: "Wataru Seken ni Oni wa Nai" (Japanese: 渡る世間に鬼はない)	July 22, 2006
A rumor spreads that Reishin Hong manipulated the imperial examination to allow Shūrei to pass. As Reishin is imprisoned, Shūrei, Seiran and Eigetsu face betrayal by a friend helping the conspiracy.
17	"Poking a Bush Draws Out a Snake/Let Sleeping Dogs Lie"; Transliteration: "Yabu o tsutsuite hebi o dasu" (Japanese: 藪をつついて蛇を出す)	August 26, 2006
In retaliation for the arrest of Shūrei and Reishin, the Hong Clan goes on strike, causing half of the imperial government to shut down. Shūrei and Eigetsu rush to finish their report before the official inquiry begins at noon.
18	"Hiding One's Head But Not One's Bottom"; Transliteration: "Atama kakushite shiri kakusazu" (Japanese: 頭隠して尻隠さず)	September 2, 2006
The plot against Shūrei is defeated after she passes a verbal examination before the Emperor and assembled officials with flying colors. Shūrei and Eigetsu's report furnishes evidence against the corrupt Sa Clan official who plotted against them.
19	"Send Your Dear Child On A Voyage"; Transliteration: "Kawaii ko ni wa tabi o saseyo" (Japanese: かわいい娘には旅をさせよ)	September 9, 2006
Ryūki appoints Shūrei and Eigetsu as co-governors of Sa Province. He is torn over his decision, and confesses to Shūrei that he loves her and will wait for her to return his feelings.
20	"Flowers Blooming From Dead Trees"; Transliteration: "Kareki ni hana saku" (Japanese: 枯れ木に花咲く)	September 16, 2006
Seiran recalls the events that led to his exile 13 years ago and the family that took him in.
21	"The Wise Man Does Not Court Danger"; Transliteration: "Kunshi ayauki ni chikayorazu" (Japanese: 君子危うきに近寄らず)	September 23, 2006
As Shūrei prepares to leave for Sa Province, she, Eigetsu and Ryūren Ran hear rumors of a ghost inhabiting the imperial palace.
22	"While There's Life, There's Hope"; Transliteration: "Inochi atte no monodane" (Japanese: 命あっての物種)	September 30, 2006
Shūrei, Eigetsu, Kōrin, Ensei and Seiran leave for their journey to Sa Province, all the while assassins are following them, hired by the Sa Clan. Eigetsu, Kōrin, Ensei and Seiran are caught during their stay in a hotel, while Shūrei is safely hidden.
23	"Companionship In Travel, Compassion In Life"; Transliteration: "Tabi wa Michizure Yo wa Nasake" (Japanese: 旅は道連れ世は情け)	October 7, 2006
While the rest are caught at the borderguard in Sairi, Shūrei has to make her way on her own to Kinka. She seeks help from the Merchants Guild, becoming a servant to a man whom she met on the streets: Senya Rin.
24	"Bolt Out Of The Blue"; Transliteration: "Nemimi ni mizu" (Japanese: 寝耳に水)	October 14, 2006
Ensei and Seiran were set free from their prison thanks to Kokujun, as Shūrei and Senya were finally departing after days of waiting, on Shūrei's part. Eigetsu and Kōrin were also freed by Kokujun, who volunteered to bring them to Kinka.
25	"An Accidental Resemblance"; Transliteration: "Tanin no sorani" (Japanese: 他人のそら似)	October 21, 2006
Shūrei muses over the new information she learned from Senya that the Hong Princess is to marry the second son of the Sa Clan. She also sees a strange resemblance between Senya and Ryūki. Ensei and Seiran follows Shūrei's trail of Kanrō Cha, and Eigetsu and Kōrin are en route to Kinka.
26	"Crows In A Moonless Night"; Transliteration: "Yamiyo no karasu" (Japanese: 闇夜の烏)	October 28, 2006
The real identity of Senya Rin is revealed, and Shūrei is caught in his clutches in Chrysanthemum Castle. Seiran and Ensei heads over there to rescue Shūrei and to catch Sakujun. He escapes with Shūrei's flowerbud hairpin, telling her to go to Koren.
27	"The Prettier the Flower, the Higher the Branch"; Transliteration: "Hana wa Oritashi Kozue wa Takashi" (Japanese: 花は折りたし梢は高し)	November 18, 2006
After recuperating from her fatigue Shūrei struggles to discern her emotions. As a result she finds herself upsetting Seiran.
28	"The Fear Is Worse Than the Danger Itself"; Transliteration: "Anzuru yori umu ga yasushi" (Japanese: 案ずるより産むが易し)	November 25, 2006
Shūrei and Eigetsu finally begin to learn that their positions will not come easy. Shūrei allows time for Seiran in order to make up for her recent shortcomings under the guidance of Ensei. Kokujun asks to protect Shunki before he sets off for Koren to confront his brother.
29	"Every Moment Feels Like an Eternity"; Transliteration: "Ichijitsu Senshū no Omoi" (Japanese: 一日千秋の思い)	December 9, 2006
Shūrei, Eigetsu, Seiran, Ensei, and Shō Sai head for Koren after hearing of the blockade occurring in Koren. Shortly after their departure the Emperor, Shūei, and Kōyū make it near Kinka. Emperor Ryūki and his comrades come to the assistance of Seiran and Ensei in order for them to pass the blockade in Koren. Shūrei prepares herself for Sakujun's confrontation.
30	"Judge a Women By Courage"; Transliteration: "Onna wa dokyō" (Japanese: 女は度胸)	December 16, 2006
Shūrei, Eigetsu, Seiran, Ensei, and Shō Sai break into Koren and head to Shō Sai's sister's home. They find two letters waiting for them there. Meanwhile, Kokujun confronts his grandfather ChuShō, while Shunki begins to make her way to Koren.
31	"A Diamond In The Rough"; Transliteration: "Hakidame ni tsuru" (Japanese: 掃きだめに鶴)	December 23, 2006
Shūrei leaves the group's hideout to meet with Sakujun, becoming a guest at the Sa Manor. Shōrin brings Shunki to Koren and meets up with Eigetsu, Seiran, Ensei, and Shō.
32	"A Woman's Word Is Her Bond"; Transliteration: "Onna ni mo Nigon Nashi" (Japanese: 女にも二言なし)	January 6, 2007
Shūrei searches the Sa Stronghold for Kokujun and Eiki with some help from Shōrin while Sakujun continues to be his usual self around Shūrei. Shūrei meets with Chūshō and staunchly declares her unwillingness to cooperate with the Sa Clan.
33	"No Use Crying Over Spilt Milk"; Transliteration: "Fukusui Bon ni Kaerazu" (Japanese: 覆水盆に返らず)	January 13, 2007
It's the night of the selection ceremony for the new head of the Sa Clan. Ensei, Eigetsu, Seiran, and Shunki sneak into the Sa Clan's Stronghold and split up to help quell Chūshō's plans. Shunki reveals her secret.
34	"Fight Poison With Poison"; Transliteration: "Doku o motte doku o seisu" (Japanese: 毒をもって毒を制す)	January 20, 2007
Shūrei and Shunki descend underground to find Kokujun, who claims the title as the next head of the Sa Clan. He arrives as the appointment ceremony to claim his new place. Eigetsu and Ensei complete their plans and apprehend all of the top officials in the Sa Clan. Meanwhile, Seiran confronts Sakujun, where they play a game of chance with their lives on the line.
35	"Every Meeting Ends In Parting"; Transliteration: "Au wa wakare no hajime" (Japanese: 逢うは別れの始め)	January 27, 2007
Seiran's game of death with Sakujun doesn't go as planned, but there are other poisons at work. Shūrei goes to meet Sakujun one last time to retrieve her hairpin.
36	"All Is Right With The World"; Transliteration: "Yo wa subete koto mo nashi" (Japanese: 世はすべてこともなし)	February 3, 2007
Shūrei and Eigetsu finally meet the other assistant governor, Yūshun Tei. The recent drama begins to wrap up and settle to a conclusion; Enjun Sa's noble goals also come to the surface. Shūrei and Eigetsu finally make it to the appointment ceremony as Sa Province's new co-governors.
37	"Tears Fall From the Eyes Like Rain Fall From the Skies"; Transliteration: "Ame wa ten kara, namida wa me kara" (Japanese: 雨は天から, 涙は目から)	February 10, 2007
Shūrei has been working over time with no rest in order to keep her mind off the death of Sakujun. Though she tries to hide the pain of the death of someone she cares, no one seems to be able to comfort her, until an old friend comes along.
38	"Seize the Day"; Transliteration: "Kyō no Nochi ni Kyō Nashi" (Japanese: 今日の後に今日なし)	February 17, 2007
Shūrei and Seiran return to Kiyō Province for the palace celebration, and they are accompanied by their new supporters, Yūshun Tei, Rin Sai-Tei, and the new head of the Sa Clan, Kokujun. All the government officials stand in the Imperial Palace as they wait for Shūrei's and Yūshun's grand entrance. Shūrei is acknowledged as the governor of Sa Province who saved it from collapse. She sees Ryūki once again and presents her proposal for the future of Sa Province. She asks Ryūki to go over her proposal on making Sa Province a center of academic research, and this will benefit Sa Province 100 years later. Everyone is amazed at Shūrei's proposal and supports it. She receives everyone's applause.
39	"Fate Decides Who Falls In Love"; Transliteration: "En wa I na Mono Aji na Mono" (Japanese: 縁は異なもの味なもの)	February 24, 2007
Shūrei and her company in the capital celebrate, but while this is going on Ryūki and Shūrei must deal with the many emotions coming from the reuniting and plausible separation again.

=== Season 2 ===
No.	Title	Original release date
1	"There's no Place Like Home"; Transliteration: "Wagaya ni Masaru Tokoro Nashi" (Japanese: わが家に勝る所なし)	April 7, 2007
Winter continues from the last season; Shūrei is still in capital city while the New Year celebrations goes on. Kōyū is informed about Kurō's plan of getting him to marry Shūrei, and becomes awkwardly shy around her. Kōyū goes to the demon's party and gets incredibly drunk. Meanwhile, Shūrei needs to tidy up the house when she discovers she is going to have some important guests, but her friends are no help.
2	"Doesn't matter whether you're laughing or crying" Transliteration: "Naku mo warau mo onaji isshō" (Japanese: 泣くも笑うも同じ一生)	April 14, 2007
The new year's celebrations continue, Shūrei collects permissions from the Departments and Clans. Meanwhile, Eigetsu reveals his past to Kōrin and Ensei. Kōyū is still considering marrying Shūrei...
3	"Birds of a feather flock together" Transliteration: "Rui wa Tomo o Yobu" (Japanese: 類は友を呼ぶ)	April 21, 2007
Ensei receives a letter from an old man (from Kōringun), informing them of a strange movement of a certain cult, founded by someone that goes by the name 'Senya Rin'. As Shūrei goes home, Ryūren once again does his hideous flute playing, and Kokujun actually thinks it's beautiful. Reishin discusses Shūrei's marriage opportunities with Shōka.
4	"If Winter Comes, Can Spring Be Far Behind?"; Transliteration: "Fuyu Kitarinaba Haru Tōkaraji" (Japanese: 冬来りなば春遠からじ)	April 28, 2007
Kurō comes to the Hong residence to discuss Shūrei's martial future with Shōka. Upon hearing that the head of merchant's guild in Kiyo refused to meet with her, Shūrei runs to find Yūshun. As she makes her way around the imperial palace, Shūrei is confronted by a mysterious man. Back in Sa Province, Ensei receives another letter saying that a snow fox was discovered near Kōringun village, the site of the strange epidemic which triggers past memories for Eigetsu.
5	"Love is not stingy in giving" Transliteration: "Ai wa Oshimi Naku Atau" (Japanese: 愛は惜しみなく与う)	May 5, 2007
Before the man could approach Shūrei, he's interrupted by Shōka. It is revealed that the man is Riō Hyō, the head of the Hyō Clan. Riō had taken an interest in Shūrei, who reminds him of his Bara-hime. Seiran gets Ryūki to start an investigation into Riō and the Hyō Clan. Shūrei and Kōyū talk but are interrupted when Yūshun arrives with a letter from the Governor of Koku Province. Eigetsu, knowing that his life is coming to an end, decides to leave for Kōringun village and bids farewell to Kōrin.
6	"A Peal of Thunder in the Blue Sky"; Transliteration: "Seiten no hekireki" (Japanese: 青天の霹靂)	May 12, 2007
Shūrei meets with Governor Kai, who tells her of Eigetsu's past. He also gives her some medical texts written by Eigestu's former caretaker Dōshu, who was the legendary doctor Kashin. During their meeting, Shūrei receives letters from Eigestu and Ensei informing her of all the occurrences in Sa Province. She immediately summons all the doctors to the palace and gives them the texts which held a great deal of information about the current epidemic. Shūrei convinces the head doctor in Kiyo to order as many doctors as possible to Kōringun village. Eigetsu meets with Ambassador Hei and assures him that Shūrei will come with the help that they need.
7	"Wholeheartedness Penetrates Even Stone"; Transliteration: "Isshin Iwa o mo Tōsu" (Japanese: 一心岩をも透す)	May 19, 2007
As the doctors go over Dōshu's texts, they stumble upon the cause and treatment for the illness. The only way to cure it is for the patient to undergo surgery. Unfortunately, none of the doctors present knew how to perform it. Shūrei hears of one who can and remembers that he is an old family friend. Dr. Yō agrees to go to Sa Province and to also train all the doctors along the way. Using Dōshu's texts as an incentive, Shūrei gets the Merchant's guild to agree to send aid as well.
8	"After Doing One's All, One Leaves Things Up to Heaven's Will"; Transliteration: "Jinji o Tsukushite Tenmei o Matsu" (Japanese: 人事を尽くして天命を待つ)	May 26, 2007
Shūrei's drastic actions causes her to be summoned by the Imperial Court to justify them. Ryūki orders that the Imperial Army deal with the mountain cult, but Shūrei openly refuses. Realizing how in the process a great deal of lives could be lost, Shūrei convinces him to allow her to deal with the cult on her own despite the risk to her own life. After everything was settled, Shūrei breaks down under all the stress, but she recovers in time to bid farewell to Ryūki and promise him that she will return safely.
9	"Meeting the Buddha in Hell"; Transliteration: "Jigoku de hotoke ni au" (Japanese: 地獄で仏に会う)	June 2, 2007
Eigetsu is helping the ill villagers, but is lured away by a cloaked man who looks identical to the deceased Dōshu. Flashbacks to Eigetsu's past are shown. In the present, Eigetsu awakens tied up inside of a cave after being beaten. After seeing the man again, Eigetsu immediately realizes that he is not Dōshu. Kōrin runs away determined to find Eigetsu. Shūrei's group with Shūei as her escort arrives in Korin but are denied entry. Luckily, Ensei and Shō Sai force the gate open and the group makes camp inside. Shūei gives Ensei Seiran's Kansho before departing. Shūrei asks Ensei that if the time comes to perform an extraordinary act.
10	"The Awaited Person Finally Comes"; Transliteration: "Machibito Kitaru" (Japanese: 待ち人きたる)	June 9, 2007
The story moves on to explain the meaning behind Shūrei's request to Ensei, and why she's worrying over being blamed for the disease when she is clearly not the one who caused it. Preparations for the treatment are being done by the doctors on the side of Shūrei, while Shuuran leads the people of Sekie village to Kōringun to speed up the treatment process. Shūrei and her company however receives some harsh welcome as they enter Kōringun, with people still believing the rumors spread by the Jasenkyō.
11	"The husband is always the last to know" Transliteration: "Shiranu wa teishu bakari nari" (Japanese: 知らぬは亭主ばかりなり)	June 16, 2007
Shūrei arrives with the doctors but becomes faced with much resistance from people of Kōringun who still blames her for the disease. They are thrown in a pinch as these people, headed by Shuon, rebel against Taishu's orders and is determined to prevent them from entering the town. Will Shūrei and the doctors be able surpass this hurdle to save the people in time?
12	"There is No Courage If You Do Not Do What Is Just"; Transliteration: "Gi o mite sezaru wa yū naki nari" (Japanese: 義を見てせざるは勇なきなり)	June 30, 2007
After successfully entering the town, Dr. Yō and the rest of the doctors prepare and begin treatment on the sick people while Shūrei and Ensei make sure to prepare everything that is needed or lacking. As more patients enter the town, the doctors continue to operate nonstop, saving most of them. As Shūrei and Dr. Yō prepare to leave for Sekiei Village, Shūran and Riō joins the group to guide them, while Seiran finishes preparations to go to Sekiei Village as well. Meanwhile, Eigetsu discovers the intentions of the Jasenkyō while Ryūki comes face to face with the head of the Hyō Clan.
13	"Hastiness Leads to Failure"; Transliteration: "Seite wa Koto o Shisonjiru" (Japanese: 急いては事を仕損じる)	July 7, 2007
While Ryūki unsuccessfully tries to invite the head of the Hyō Clan to some tea, the fake Dōshu waits for Eigetsu to die or Yōgetsu to appear. Ensei heads to Sekiei Village ahead of Shūrei and meets up with Seiran in the village. Seiran refuses to accept the sword Kansho from Ensei, telling him that until everything is over, he is to keep it by his side. While Shūrei and company formulate a plan to infiltrate the Jasenkyō hideout, a tired and normal clothed Ryūren shows up in their camp. Kōrin gets help from Shūren, enabling her to be reunited with her special person.
14	"Enter the Tiger's Den"; Transliteration: "Koketsu ni Iru" (Japanese: 虎穴に入る)	July 14, 2007
While Kōrin starts the rescue operation, Ryūren tells a sleeping Shūrei that he'll go ahead to meet Eigetsu. After a touching reunion (and a long one at that), Eigetsu urges Kōrin to save the villagers rather than him. Seiran and Ryūren infiltrate the Jasenkyō hideout in different ways, with Seiran rescuing the villagers and Ryūren helping an unconscious Eigetsu back up. Meanwhile, Shūrei and Ensei walks inside the hideout and meets with the fake Dōshu whose body possessed by a boy, oblivious to the trap set before them.
15	"A Flash of Time"; Transliteration: "Issun no Kōin" (Japanese: 一寸の光陰)	July 21, 2007
As Shūrei and Ensei place the fake Dōshu and his men under arrest, he tries to buy time to make Shūrei step on the trap, but is surprised when he discovers that all the villagers are gone, and his men are replaced with men from the Sashu army, with Serian leading them. As Shūrei takes a step forward towards Senya, activating the trap, and is set immobile. But before the trap fully activates she is rescued by Riō, who tells fake Dōshu who is actually a boy called Ren that he was betrayed by his own people and doesn't have a body to go back to. It seems like Ren is actually Riō's relative. Eigetsu asks Kōrin and Ryūren to bring him near Kashin's body, before collapsing and to be replaced by Yōgetsu.
16	"Candle in the Wind"; Transliteration: "Fūzen no tomoshibi" (Japanese: 風前のともし火)	July 28, 2007
As Kōrin falls ill from the shock, she is brought to Sekiei village to recover, while Yōgetsu is visited by the spirit of Kashin, and is requested a favor from Dr. Yō, who is one of the Eight Sages in disguise. As dawn breaks, Kōrin is visited by none other than Eigetsu, who tells her Yougetsu has once again given him life, enough to die of old age. Meanwhile, officials at the Imperial Palace are outraged that the outbreak has been resolved, and try to prevent the credit from falling to Shūrei. Ryūki is forced to demote Eigetsu, and Shūrei is suspended to Joukan, or a rank in name only. As Sekiei village begins reviving, Shūrei and company receives a letter from the Palace, informing them of their demotion.
17	"Seven Ups and Downs"; Transliteration: "Ukishizumi Nanatabi" (Japanese: 浮き沈み七度)	August 4, 2007
Shūrei and company throw a feast to celebrate the revival of the cities in Kōrin, when they are visited by Governor Kei the next day, Governor Kei handing the gift entrusted to him by Ryūki to Shūrei. As Shūrei and Seiran depart for Kiyou, they are sent off by all the people in Kōrin. After arriving home, they witness the first buds from the Sakura tree they got from Ryūki, with Spring now approaching.
18	"The Road is Distant After Sunset"; Transliteration: "Hi Kurete Michi Tōshi" (Japanese: 日暮れて道遠し)	September 15, 2007
Past events are shown: The journey to Kōringun, the operation on the sick villagers, successful entry to the hideout of the Jasenkyo and the capture of its members, and Eigetsu coming back from the dead. Ryūki wonders whether his decision to have Shūrei unemployed would cause her to slap him.
19	"Counting Your Chickens Before They Hatch"; Transliteration: "Toranu tanuki no kawa zanyo" (Japanese: 捕らぬ狸の皮算用)	September 22, 2007
Seiran delivers a message to Ryūki from Shūrei, stating that their next meeting would be when the Sakura Bloom. Ryūki offers Yūshun Tei the position of Prime Minister, but Yūshun only accepts if the Emperor accepts the ten conditions he has set. Two men try to propose to Shūrei while on the way to the Kogaro to meet Kochō about a painting, and is greeted warmly by Kochō's guest.
20	"Futile Efforts"; Transliteration: "Noren ni ude oshi" (Japanese: 暖簾に腕押し)	September 29, 2007
Karin, the name of Kochō's guest, finds Shūrei to be quite cute, then leaves when she sees the painting. Shūrei and company find out that the paintings are fake and find counterfeit coins while still in the Kogaro and dashes off to find out who did it with the help of Shin Suou, one of the guys who proposed to her and is also an official. Shūrei and company find a lot of forgeries in the shops around town, while Seiran notices that someone is following them.
21	"Like Father Like Son"; Transliteration: "Kaeru no ko wa kaeru" (Japanese: 蛙の子は蛙)	October 6, 2007
As they continue searching for forgeries, Shūrei and company discover that prices for everyday household prices are slowly rising and ask for the help of Sai Rin. Shin Suou is baffled why Shūrei tries so hard even though she is suspended, while Karin comes back to the Kogaro and recognizes the painting Kochō has put up for display. Karin goes to the place on where the painting is situated from and is found by Ryūki and company. Shūrei and Company arrived minutes later and discover that the place is Shin Suou's home. Shin Suou leads them to a locked building, then opens the door to reveal Banri, Karin's son, painting the forgeries.
22	"The Parasite In the Lion's Body"; Transliteration: "Shishi shinchū no mushi" (Japanese: 獅子身中の虫)	October 13, 2007
Shūrei and company learn that Banri was tricked by two men into doing the paintings, while Shin Suou reveals his amazing insight on how his father is part of the painting forgeries but is not involved in the money counterfeiting. But before they can do anything, someone else had sent soldiers from the Imperial Palace arrest Shin Suou and his father on counterfeiting and forgery charges, which carries the death penalty. Shūrei goes through the official procedures and with some "persuasion" from Seiran, convinces Shin Suou to help lower the penalty on his father. Shūrei meets with Ryūki and watches the first Sakura blossoms from the tree, with Shūrei venting her anger on "Ryūki" for the suspension.
23	"One Good Turn Deserves Another"; Transliteration: "Nasake wa hito no tame narazu" (Japanese: 情けは人のためならず)	October 27, 2007
Shūrei returns to work as just a joukan but to make matters worse officials have proposed the idea of kicking out useless joukan in less than a month. No departments are willing to take Shūrei either. Anjuu and Kouki, the head of the Section of Government Inspection, talk about the firing of the joukan, and Kouki agrees. Anjuu asks him not to bully Shurei and he said she brought it on herself. Sensing Shuuei is worried about something, Ryuki challenges him to a game of Go and offers him some vacation time if he wins. Meanwhile Shurei helps the other joukan. In the process she meets a strange joukan called Seiga-kun. Shūrei, Tan-tan, and Seiga-kun all pitch in to help the other joukan in getting jobs. While cleaning up the filthy joukan common room Shūrei discovers a horde of peach colored books, aka porn, that the other joukan had hidden. After purposely losing the game of Go, Ryuki gives Shuuei some time off. Seiran asks why he went so easy on Shuuei, and he says he doesn't want to lose him. Seiran lets Ryuki know he and Shurei will always stand by him.
24	"The Hardships of Youth Are Worth Bearing"; Transliteration: "Wakai Toki no Kurō wa Katte mo Seyo" (Japanese: 若いときの苦労は買ってもせよ)	November 3, 2007
Shurei works with the joukan one by one with the help of Tan-tan and Seiga. Tan-tan goes to visit his dad in prison and takes him riceballs. Later he goes to see the chief of the Gyoshidai and offers him a deal to spare his father's life. While cooking, Shurei remembers what Tan-tan said about all men having peach-colored books, even Seiran. When Seiran walks into the kitchen, she asks if she could look under his bed and at the bottom of his closet. Seiran agrees, but asks why. Feeling pressured, Shurei tells him what Tan-tan said about the books. Seiran denies having any, but then Shūrei points out that he knows what "peach colored books" are. He silently promises to give Tan-tan hell. At dinner, Shurei, her dad, and Seiran talk about Seiga being her rival. Later Tan-tan and Seiran talk about Shūrei and Tan-tan asks Seiran to do him a favor. Shurei is in the joukan common room working late when a strange man comes in and offers her a peach. When she asks the man who he is, he replies "Anjuu". He then has her peel the peach for him and eats it himself. At the end Ryūki comes face to face with Riō-kun (junior).
25	"Even The Wise Look Like Fools When They Keep Mum"; Transliteration: "Taiken wa Gu naru ga Gotoshi" (Japanese: 大賢は愚なるが如し)	November 3, 2007
Shūrei, while distressing on the half a month left, talks with Tan-tan. Tan-tan notes the erhu at the side of the table and asks her to play him a song. Ryūki visits Riō-kun (junior) and tells him about the woman he loves-Shūrei. While worrying to herself in the garden, Shūrei meets a mysterious man. While cooking, Shūrei realises that the salt is gritty. When she goes out, she finds out that the prices of salt has risen. The woman selling the salt tells her that the salt had been mixed with white sand and says that Shūrei has probably noticed it, which Shūrei had indeed. While talking with the woman, Tan-tan notices and approaches her. She tells Tan-tan that she wants to investigate this, even though Tan-tan tells her not to. She and Tan-tan come across Seiga-kun, who takes an interest and offers to help. She goes to meet Rin Sai-Tei and Shūei about the salt incident. Shūei gives her peaches at the end of the visit. The next morning, she goes to meet Ryūki, who is with Riō-kun (junior), and to eat breakfast with him. Riō-kun (junior) initially hides himself behind the bookshelf. But, Ryūki calls for him to eat together with him and Shūrei. Shūrei is surprised. She and Seiga-kun work hard. She meets Hakumei-kun and Seiga-kun excuses himself. Later, while Seiga-kun and Shūrei are investigating, Yōshū-san visits them. He comments that Tan-tan has not been here. He says that the rumor is probably true that Tan-tan's father has died. Shūrei is shocked.
26	"The One Who Waits Has It Worse Than The One Who Is Waited For"; Transliteration: "Matareru mi yori matsu mi" (Japanese: 待たれる身より待つ身)	November 11, 2007
Shūrei receives the things she asked from Shūei. Tan-tan is working as a live-in worker for a woman. Shūrei and Seiga discuss their findings. Shūrei works all night to finish her report, but finds it missing after she awakens from her nap. Seeing that it is nightfall, she rushes to the Jin Clan residence. She meets Seiga who is now showing his true colors and admits to being an undercover inspector and stealing the report so Shurei will be fired. While they are conversing, Tan-tan appears and explains that his mother lives here and tells Seiga he knew what he was doing all along. He gives Shurei some missing evidence to secure she won't be fired. Then Tan-tan yells to the Director General, who enters. The Director of the Office of Inspection is the mysterious man whom Shūrei met in the garden. He leaves after saying that Shūrei and Tan-tan will work under him. Shūrei discovers that Tan-tan's father isn't dead and that Tan-tan had asked Seiran to guard his father. At a meeting of the imperial head officials, the results of the joukan assessment which turned out to be on all officials, including upper and middle-class nobles, was given along with a list of those that should be dismissed. Also, Riō Hyō is announced as the new Chief Secretary of the Department of Mystic Study. Shūei Ran receives a letter saying that his sister, Jyūsan-hime will be sent and to bring her into the inner court.
27	"Peaches and Chestnuts in Three Years, Persimmons in Eight"; Transliteration: "Momo Kuri Sannen Kaki Hachinen" (Japanese: 桃栗三年柿八年)	November 24, 2007
An episode of recaps. Seiran and Ryūki are alone in the room. Seiran tells Ryūki of Tan-tan. They talk of many things. When Kōyū appears, in Seiran's presence, Ryūki tells Kōyū that he is considering taking a wife, but he will take only one. Kyou thinks that is a good idea and promises to see the proposal pass at the next assembly. There are recaps of Shūei too. Episode ends with Ryūki alone.
28	"Absence Makes The Heart Grows Fonder"; Transliteration: "Tōzakaru hodo Omoi ga Tsunoru" (Japanese: 遠ざかる程想いが募る)	December 1, 2007
There is a girl on horseback. Ensei appears. Shūrei is very angry and vents her anger while cooking. Shūei has flashbacks of a girl. While walking, he sees Shusui dancing the "Sōyōren". Shusui is suffering from a sound. Ryūki introduces her to Riō. Shūrei, Seiga and Tan-tan are in the same room, when Shūrei and Seiga converse, Tan-tan says that it's scary. Anju visits while Shūrei and Tan-tan are eating. Kōki gives Shūrei and Seiga a mission to protect the Jyūsan-hime. Shūrei meets the girl, who stops the thief. Seiran and Shūei are talking about loyalty. Then, the girl enters and Shūei says Jyūsan-hime.
29	"The Silent Firefly Is More Likely To Be Consumed By The Flames Of Love"; Transliteration: "Nakanu hotaru ga mi o kogasu" (Japanese: 鳴かぬ蛍が身を焦がす)	December 12, 2007
Jyūsan-hime and Shūei talk after Seiran leaves. Shūrei and Tan-tan go to the prison to inspect. There, she talks with a prisoner, "Shun-san", who leaves, as he has been judged innocent. Tan-tan and Shūrei, while walking, are attacked by a bunch of guys. They escape safely. When they return, she and Seiga talk about their mission and that Jyūsan-hime has arrived. Tan-tan helps to lift her spirits. Later, she meets Riō(junior) while searching for a book and has a cup of tea with him. Shusui and Ryūki are having a talk. Jyūsan-hime talks to Shūei. Jyūsan-hime and Shūrei meet again.
30	"One Reaps What One Sows"; Transliteration: "Mi kara deta sabi" (Japanese: 身から出たさび)	January 5, 2008
Shūrei is dressed up as the bait. Tan-tan and Seiran state their opinions on her disguise. Jyūsan-hime finds poison and measures are taken within themselves. Shūrei meets Seiga in her disguise. Jyūsan-hime gives Shusui a letter to give to Shūei. Jyūsan-hime and Ryūki talk. Shusui talks to Jyūsan-hime. Shūrei is left alone as bait. A mysterious man talks to Shūrei. Seiga talks to her and does her hair. Shūei comes to pick her up. Shūrei meets Ryūki. Seiga is seen talking with the official from the Department of Military Affairs.
31	"With Painful Reluctance"; Transliteration: "Ushirogami o hikareru" (Japanese: 後ろ髪を引かれる)	January 12, 2008
Shūrei talks with Ryūki. Ryūki goes to meet Kōyū and is allowed in. While Tan-tan and Shūrei are talking, Anju appears. Shūrei comes to a realisation after talking with Anju and then leaves with Tan-tan to get to work. When in the prison with Tan-tan, she meets Ensei. Later, she has a talk with Jyūsan-hime. Seiga is prepared and the official from the Department of Military affairs is there. A fight ensues. The official from the Department of Military Affairs dies.
32	"One Changes With Time"; Transliteration: "Tsukihi Kawareba Ki mo Kawaru" (Japanese: 月日変われば気も変わる)	January 26, 2008
Shūei and Jyūsan-hime are awaiting a person. They meet "Shun", but Shūei calls him Jin. Jin calls Jyūsan-hime, Hotaru. Jin and Shūei fight after a short talk. Shūrei and Ensei make their appearance. Jin meets the Black Wolf after leaving. Shūrei and Seiga give their report to Kouki. Kōyū and Shūei talk. Shūei and Ryūki have a battle. Shūei returns the Iris Sword at the end of the battle and Ryuki gives him an embroidered handkerchief. Ryūki decides to go and take Shūei back.
33	"Bluer than Indigo"; Transliteration: "Ai yori aoshi" (Japanese: 藍より青し)	February 2, 2008
34	"Crossing a Dangerous Bridge"; Transliteration: "Abunai hashi o wataru" (Japanese: 危ない橋を渡る)	February 9, 2008
35	"Go to where your Heart Seeks"; Transliteration: "Jinsei Itaru Tokoro ni Seizan Ari" (Japanese: 人生いたる所に青山あり)	February 16, 2008
36	"The Eyes are the Mirror of the Soul"; Transliteration: "Me wa kokoro no kagami" (Japanese: 目は心の鏡)	February 23, 2008
37	"Friends through Life And Death"; Transliteration: "Funkei no Majiwari" (Japanese: 刎頚の交わり)	March 1, 2008
38	"Fate Crosses the Distance"; Transliteration: "En Areba Senri" (Japanese: 縁あれば千里)	March 8, 2008
39	"Destined Partners Cannot Be Separated"	March 15, 2008
Shūrei and company return from Ran province back to the Imperial City. Ryūki tells Shūrei that he can't wait forever for her, because as the emperor, he has a duty to get married. He suggests a contest to her: if he can win her over within a certain length of time, then he wins and she will marry him. If he can't, then she wins; he will never ask her again and he will instead marry Jyūsan-hime, who has succeeded Shusui as head of the court ladies. Shūrei agrees and asks him how long the contest will last; the series ends with Ryūki whispering the deadline "Until the Sakura Blooms" into Shūrei's ear.

== See also ==
- List of The Story of Saiunkoku characters
