= List of KimiKiss: Pure Rouge episodes =

The anime, titled KimiKiss: Pure Rouge, aired in Japan between October 6 to March 24, 2008.

== Story ==
Kouichi Sanada wakes from a dream where his younger self was crying. When he goes to answer the door, he finds a beautiful woman standing in front of him. She quickly enters while reacquainting herself with things in the house, and even enters the shower. A confused Kouichi tries to remember if he knew a girl like this in the past; while trying to remember, his friend Kazuki Aihara comes in. A misunderstanding is caused when the girl comes out of the bathroom, but she suddenly realizes who Kazuki is. Kazuki also realizes who the girl is: his and Kouchi's childhood friend, Mao Mizusawa. Finally realizing this, Kouichi welcomes Mao back. When Kouichi's mother begins talking to Mao about her living in France, Kouichi notices how much Mao has changed. The story then continues with them going to the same school. Many relationships are formed with different people during their school years as Mao and Kouchi realize their true feelings for each other while Sakino and Futami develop feelings for Kazuki.

== Episodes ==
US air dates are the dates the Anime Network made them available via video on demand on various cable systems.

No.	Title	Original release date	U.S. release date
1	"Meet Again"	6 October 2007	4 November 2010
Kouichi Sanada wakes up and goes downstairs because of a loud knock at the door. At the door was his childhood friend Mao Mizusawa who he didn't recognize at first. A short while after Mao takes a shower, and Kouichi's other childhood friend Aihara, who also knows Mao as a childhood friend, shows up at his house too. Aihara is surprised to hear a girl in Kouichi's shower, and starts questioning Kouichi about it, until Kouichi yells out that he didn't know who she was. Mao ran out of the bathroom and started yelling at Kouichi for not remembering her. Mao then noticed Aihara standing there, and then Aihara and Kouichi finally remembered who she was. Later that night Mao and Kouichi stayed up late playing a video game. The next morning they went to school, Mao ran into a mysterious and quiet boy, Kouichi was surprised by something, and Aihara received a kiss from the famous genius girl Futami.
2	"Cool Beauty"	13 October 2007	11 November 2010
Ever since he returned from school, Kazuki has been thinking about Eriko. He asks for some info on her from Akira but is unable to get anything helpful. Today is also the first day for all the freshman at school.
3	"Bookmark"	20 October 2007	18 November 2010
It's a new school day and Nana and her friend Narumi are messing about with their frogs. When Kouichi arrives with Mao, Nana uses this as a chance to invite Mao to a welcoming party.
4	"Step In"	27 October 2007	25 November 2010
It's been a month since everyone went to the karaoke box together and Mao is annoyed at Kouichi, who hasn't made any progress with Yuumi. Meanwhile Mao has been receiving a lot of love letters recently but she only considers them to be a nuisance.
5	"Jump Up"	3 November 2007	2 December 2010
Mao goes on a date with Eiji to a live jazz show. Kouichi is spending more time with Yuumi, using the movie club screenplay as an excuse. Kazuki has been agitated - even Mao has noticed, so she gives him some words of advice.
6	"Each Melancholy"	10 November 2007	9 December 2010
Kazuki decides to continue the “experiment” with Eriko. Before that, he goes to make amends with Asuka. Mao should be feeling the strain of the midterm prep, but she has no motivation. So Kouichi & Kazuki get everyone together for a study session.
7	"Dear Actress"	17 November 2007	16 December 2010
Midterms are over so now they have time to think about the movie. Seeing as how Kouichi did a good job on the synopsis, what’s left is to find an actress for the female lead. They discuss this at Narumi’s family restaurant.
8	"Close to You"	24 November 2007	23 December 2010
Mao has been acting weird ever since the kiss she had with Eiji; Kazuki has been suspiciously cheerful as well. Mao can't seem to face Eiji so she does her best to avoid him in school. While Kouichi is stuck with Akira, Kazuiki goes out with Eriko.
9	"Water Girls"	1 December 2007	30 December 2010
Everyone has met up to talk about the movie synopsis, which is missing something. Kouichi is still thinking about the chance encounter with Mao and Eiji. Akira suggests using the school's swim tournament to get a girl in a swimsuit for the movie.
10	"Miss Tone"	8 December 2007	6 January 2011
Tired of the bad atmosphere, Kouichi heads out to the bookstore, where he runs into Eiji. Meanwhile Kazuki is having soccer practice with Asuka. The next day Mao goes out on a date with Eiji but Kouichi is stuck at home with a cold.
11	"Tear Drops"	15 December 2007	13 January 2011
Everyone is at Mitsuki's mansion, to check out the location where parts of the movie will be filmed. There's an uncomfortable atmosphere around Kouichi and Mao and they can't even talk to each other, after what happened the previous night.
12	"Passing Rain"	22 December 2007	20 January 2011
It's a new school day and Kouichi is somewhat worried about Yuumi, after what happened at the train station. On the other hand Kazuki is in high spirits with things between him and Eriko going surprisingly well.
13	"Crossroad"	5 January 2008	27 January 2011
With summer vacation fast approaching, Kouichi somehow managed to finish the script for the movie. Kazuki has been really nice to Asuka lately and just when she starts to realize her feelings for him he tells her that he likes Eriko.
14	"Summer Holidays"	12 January 2008	3 February 2011
The summer break has arrived. Kouichi tries to make as many memories with Yuumi as he can, while she is still around.
15	"Now's the Time"	19 January 2008	10 February 2011
The filming isn’t going as smoothly as planned, with Yuumi as the lead female. A replacement is needed, but the only person suitable is Mao. Later Kouichi takes Yuumi to the beach and Mao goes to see Eiji perform in a live concert.
16	"Stand In"	26 January 2008	17 February 2011
Mao still feels unsettled after seeing Kouichi kiss Yuumi. Kouichi and Yuumi go on a date to watch a movie in the cinema. Kazuki and Asuka practice together, but he’s been getting distracted. Once she discovers the reason, she confronts Eriko.
17	"Her Answer"	2 February 2008	24 February 2011
Kazuki has been taking time off after being dumped by Eriko and Asuka is worried, seeing as how she caused it all. Kouichi and Yuumi have been spending the remainder of their summer together, yet he still feels lonely at home with Mao not around.
18	"Rainy Blue"	9 February 2008	3 March 2011
In the rain, Mao dumps Eiji. She returns home soaked and ends up with a fever. Kazuki suddenly gets a call from Asuka. They go back to her place to have a chat. Kouichi continues to worry about Mao.
19	"True Heart"	16 February 2008	10 March 2011
The new school semester has begun but that is the least of Kouichi’s worries, as he is still quite shaken up after Mao declared her love for him. All the classes are preparing for the upcoming school festival.
20	"Uncontrollable"	23 February 2008	17 March 2011
After running from the filming, Mao ends up meeting Eiji by coincidence and they talk. Kouichi is worried about Mao, and Yuumi is worried because she’s sensed the feelings Mao and Kouichi have for each other.
21	"Cutting Memory"	1 March 2008	24 March 2011
Mao is already making preparations to move next Sunday. At school everyone is busy preparing for the School Festival and even Nana and Narumi with their Udon Association are making steady progress.
22	"Time Goes By"	8 March 2008	31 March 2011
At school Kazuki has noticed that Kouichi and Asuka have been acting weird lately, so he tries to do what he can to help them. Kouichi is still brooding over Mao. The gang throw a farewell party for Yuumi.
23	"Miss You"	15 March 2008	7 April 2011
Akira has completed all the movie club’s preparations for the school festival, so all that’s left is for Yuumi and Koichi to enjoy their last day together.
24	"...and Meet Again"	22 March 2008	14 April 2011
The Kibana School Festival is in full swing, however Kazuki is somewhat troubled because Eriko is nowhere to be found and he thinks it may have to do with Asuka.
Extra	"Love Fighter"	29 March 2008	21 April 2011
Megumi Kuryu questions the frivolity of love: its meaning, why people need, and more importantly, can a prefect such as herself experience it. Megumi’s thirst for enlightenment leads her into encounters with friends as she tries to find her answer.
