= List of El Cazador de la Bruja episodes =

This is a list of episodes of the El Cazador de la Bruja (エル·カザド, Eru Kazado) television series. The episodes were written by Kenichi Kanemaki with Hiroyuki Kawasaki and Satoru Nishizono and the series was directed by Kōichi Mashimo and produced by Bee Train animation studio. The opening theme is "Hikari no Yukue" by savage genius while the ending theme is "romanesque" by FictionJunction Yuuka.

== Episode list ==
No.	Title	Original release date
1	"A Woman on the Run"; Transliteration: "Nigeru Onna" (Japanese: 逃げる女)	April 2, 2007
In an unnamed locale resembling Mexico, Nadie, a bounty hunter, is hired to look for Ellis, a young, innocent, amnesiac girl who's currently staying with an elderly fortune teller. Soon, it becomes apparent to Ellis that many others are looking for her as well. With some intervention from Nadie, Ellis is saved from various encounters from other bounty hunters, but things take a turn for the worse when fire is set to Ellis's home. With the fortune teller, whom Ellis refers to as "granny", on the verge of death, she bids Ellis farewell and entrusts her safety to Nadie. The two steal a vehicle from two gay bounty hunters and their journey begins.
2	"A Woman Who Waits"; Transliteration: "Matsu Onna" (Japanese: 待つ女)	April 9, 2007
With their vehicle broken down, Ellis and Nadie arrive at a small restaurant owned by a somewhat disgruntled woman named Frida. Though she takes an instant liking to Ellis, Frida's attitude towards Nadie isn't as positive when she learns that Nadie is a bounty hunter. Frida's negative feelings for bounty hunters is shown to be because it estranged her from her daughter ten years prior. Her daughter, Maria, greatly disapproved of her mother's previous life as a bounty hunter and put herself up for adoption. Soon after, Ellis is kidnapped by a bounty hunter from the previous episode and is rescued by Frida, though when Nadie encounters Maria and brings her to Frida's restaurant after the scuffle is over, Nadie takes the credit and Maria's hatred in order to preserve the relationship between mother and daughter. With tears in her eyes and thoughts of a happy family, Nadie bids Frida farewell and drives off with Ellis. Meanwhile, a mysterious young man with looks similar to Ellis is watching the two.
3	"A Woman Rained Upon"; Transliteration: "Furareru Onna" (Japanese: 降られる女)	April 16, 2007
Ellis and Nadie take refuge from the rain in an abandoned house near the river, accompanied by the skeletal corpse of the previous owner. Shortly after, L.A. makes his entrance and informs Ellis that he has been watching her.
4	"A Woman with an Angle"; Transliteration: "Nerau Onna" (Japanese: 狙う女)	April 23, 2007
While being pursued by two bounty hunters, Ellis and Nadie take refuge in a convent. The sisters there are eager to offer them protection, with zealous disregard for their own safety.
5	"A Woman Who Puts It On"; Transliteration: "Kiru Onna" (Japanese: 着る女)	April 30, 2007
The girls' jeep gets sabotaged, forcing them to stop in a nearby village for the night. There, Ellis gets kidnapped by a bounty hunter assisted by a local girl who dreams of going to the city, prompting Nadie to mount a rescue.
6	"A Man in Love"; Transliteration: "Koisuru Otoko" (Japanese: 恋する男)	May 7, 2007
As the girls stop by another town on their journey south, they run into Miguel, Nadie's old acquaintance. However, she is not overjoyed to see him, as he had deceived her in the past. L.A. steals a kiss from Ellis while she sleeps.
7	"A Man Who Works"; Transliteration: "Hataraku Otoko" (Japanese: 働く男)	May 14, 2007
The girls arrive at a fairly luxurious hotel in hope that they can get some decent sleep without interruptions. There they run into Lirio, who is waiting for Ricardo. In the meantime, Ricardo is instructed by Rosenberg to teach L.A. a lesson about controlling his obsession with Ellis.
8	"A Woman Who Lies"; Transliteration: "Usotsuku Onna" (Japanese: 嘘つく女)	May 21, 2007
Nadie receives a gunshot wound when going out buying food. In desperation, Ellis uses her power to remove the bullet from Nadie's body. This event is witnessed by the son of a powerful mafia boss, who proceeds to take her in, hoping to talk her into healing his father's sickness. Eventually Ellis finds out that the best thing she can do for the old man is to tell him a white lie.
9	"A Woman Who Digs"; Transliteration: "Horu Onna" (Japanese: 掘る女)	May 28, 2007
An attempt to evade bounty hunters has the heroines trapped inside an abandoned silver mine. There they meet a woman who is digging to find a silver cross, something that everyone in her family wants except for her.
10	"A Man Who Lives With an Angel"; Transliteration: "Tenshi to Kurasu Otoko" (Japanese: 天使と暮らす男)	June 4, 2007
The heroines intervene when a man who runs a local franchise taco restaurant is about to get assaulted. The man offers them to stay for the night and eventually recalls the interesting circumstances as to how he met his wife.
11	"A Woman Who Conjures"; Transliteration: "Majinau Onna" (Japanese: 呪う女)	June 11, 2007
Nadie and Ellis encounter a village where denizens worship a fake witch. With danger of being discovered as a fake, the woman tries to befriend Ellis in order to strengthen her own position. When the townspeople discover the truth, they come to her mansion, demanding the money she has swindled out of them.
12	"A Man Who Shoots"; Transliteration: "Utsu Otoko" (Japanese: 撃つ男)	June 18, 2007
The heroines encounter Ortega, a man who collect guns and has himself holed up inside an armored van due to his anti-government sentiment. Before long, they are attacked and forced to escape in Ortega's van. The assailants are assassins sent to eliminate Ellis by rogue elements within the organization Blue-Eyes works for. Blue-Eyes, unable to do anything else to stop the attack, gives the heroines one instruction, saying that the attack would stop at sunrise.
13	"A Woman Who Conceals"; Transliteration: "Kakusu Onna" (Japanese: 隠す女)	June 25, 2007
The heroines end up in a town that is supposedly abandoned due to a disease outbreak. Nadie, however, suspects otherwise, which is confirmed when they discover a biological research facility nearby and are ambushed by gunmen wearing protective suits. Separated from Ellis, Nadie enters the research facility to find her but instead finds a shocking revelation about the other girl's past.
14	"Maple Leaf"; Transliteration: "Meipuru Riifu" (Japanese: メイプルリーフ)	July 3, 2007
The episode goes over the events that led to the murder Dr. Heinz Schneider. It shows the burgeoning affection between Schneider and Ellis, as well as Rosenberg engineering things behind Schneider's back.
15	"A Woman Who Defies"; Transliteration: "Sakarau Onna" (Japanese: 逆らう女)	July 10, 2007
The heroines meet Ricardo and Lirio in an abandoned hot spring hotel. There they learn that Ricardo is now out of a job, as Rosenberg is forced into early retirement in order to eliminate any link between Project Leviathan and the Central Intelligence Agency. Following these events, the organization that Blue-Eyes works for decides that instead of having Ellis assassinated, they would bring her in. Nadie, however, has other ideas.
16	"A Woman Angered"; Transliteration: "Ikaru Onna" (Japanese: 怒る女)	July 17, 2007
In response to Nadie's desertion, Blue-Eyes has her bank account frozen. This forces Nadie and Ellis to seek temporary employment in a taco restaurant along the way. After seeing Ellis being harassed by customers, Nadie tells her that she should not be suppressing her displeasure when she feels that way. When L.A. appears before Ellis and tries to provoke her, this advice comes in handy.
17	"A Woman Who Corners"; Transliteration: "Oitsumeru Onna" (Japanese: 追い詰める女)	July 24, 2007
Not having alleviated her financial crisis, Nadie is forced to find work as a bounty hunter again. What she does not know is that Ricardo, in a similar situation due to Rosenberg's downfall, is going after the same target as she is.
18	"A Woman Who Quarrels"; Transliteration: "Isakau Onna" (Japanese: 諍う女)	July 31, 2007
Nadie accidentally breaks Ellis's amulet, causing her to get angry, refusing to talk to Nadie anymore. They encounter a roadhouse where an old man offers them a place to stay. It is soon discovered that old man is not what he appears to be.
19	"A Man Who Protects"; Transliteration: "Mamoru Otoko" (Japanese: 守る男)	August 6, 2007
Ricardo's car breaks down, so Nadie picks him up to the nearest town where he could fix it. A mechanic mistakes Nadie and Ricardo for a couple and offers them free tickets to a fancy restaurant. However, it turns out to be a plot to kidnap Ellis.
20	"A Woman Captured"; Transliteration: "Torawareta Onna" (Japanese: 囚われた女)	August 13, 2007
L.A. arrives in a town bar, and after being irritated by some of the bar's patrons, kills several of the people there. When Ellis and Nadie arrive in the same town, the police there arrest Nadie and throw her in prison. Under Nadie's orders to escape, Ellis runs off and joins Ricardo and Lirio. L.A. appears at the police headquarters and reveals that he's using the police to separate Nadie and Ellis. Ellis, Ricardo, and Lirio attempt to free Nadie, but L.A., having killed the two policemen at the HQ, decides to kill Nadie before that. Nadie, having taunted L.A. about how human he seems despite having a hatred for them, is saved by Ellis before he's able to kill her. As a last-ditch attempt to separate them, L.A. reveals why Nadie originally approached Ellis, but his attempt backfires when Ellis declares that no matter why she did, Nadie is most important to her. With this, L.A. flees defeated in both his plan and his desire to win Ellis's heart.
21	"A Woman Who Takes Wing"; Transliteration: "Habataku Onna" (Japanese: 羽ばたく女)	August 20, 2007
Due to Blue-Eyes's inability to capture Ellis, she receives a new order, to eliminate Nadie, with the condition that she must carry out the order herself. In the meantime, Ellis and Nadie are trying to capture a particular vulture after falling for a conman's scam. Throughout her mission, Blue Eyes shows constant hesitation to carry out her orders and after listening to various conversations between Ellis and Nadie, Blue Eyes decides to shoot her cell phone, cutting the ties she has with the organization she worked for permanently. She also reveals that she too is a witch (though she cannot use witch abilities), thanks her subordinates for their help, and walks off hoping that Ellis and Nadie find the answers they seek.
22	"A Woman Who Awakens"; Transliteration: "Mezameru Onna" (Japanese: 目覚める女)	August 27, 2007
Ellis and Nadie's travel and bounty hunting activities eventually lead them into a place of ancient ruins, where Ellis' power is greatly increased by a large Inca Rose atop a stone pillar. This is when Rosenberg finally makes his move.
23	"A Woman Uncertain"; Transliteration: "Madou Onna" (Japanese: 惑う女)	September 3, 2007
With Nadie currently in the hospital from her injuries received in the previous episode, Blue Eyes explains the history of witches and their powers. When Nadie recovers and Blue Eyes's explanation complete, Ellis decides it best to leave her side out of fear that she'll harm those she cares about most. Ellis seeks out L.A. and she proposes that they go someplace far away together. Ignoring Blue Eyes's suggestion that she leave Ellis be, Nadie decides what she truly wants and seeks out Ellis knowing that they both need the one closest to them right now. L.A. scares off Ellis when he goes temporarily insane from Rosenberg's influence. With Blue Eyes's help, Nadie finds Ellis and explains to her that she'll always be by her side no matter what. The next day, the two girls meet Rosenberg for the first time.
24	"A Man Who Passes On"; Transliteration: "Yuku Otoko" (Japanese: 逝く男)	September 10, 2007
Ellis and Nadie finally meet Rosenberg and he announces his intention of killing Nadie in order to awaken the full potential of Ellis's witch powers. Ricardo arrives and intends to kill Rosenberg, but the two girls stop him as they haven't received all the answers they seek from him. In preparation for their arrival to Wiñay Marka, the girls, Ricardo, Lirio, and Blue Eyes discuss what their plan of action will be against Rosenberg. During that time, Rosenberg erases L.A.'s memory of Ellis and assigns him to kill Ricardo. Ricardo and L.A. face off with Ricardo eventually coming up victorious when L.A. regains his memory of Ellis and how he came to love her. With news of L.A.'s death, Nadie and Ellis decide to finish their adventure on their own.
25	"A Woman Divine"; Transliteration: "Seinaru Onna" (Japanese: 聖なる女)	September 17, 2007
Ellis and Nadie arrive at Wiñay Marka (in which they've been seeking, and which has a strong resemblance with Machu Picchu) and meet up with Rosenberg. Reciting the witches' ancient lore, Rosenberg takes control of Ellis's powers and uses them to harm Nadie. With Nadie nearing death, Ellis requests that she kill her so that she can't be harmed by Rosenberg. Nadie reluctantly and tearfully accepts the request, and Ellis declares her love for her. However, even after Ellis is killed, Nadie dies shortly after from her injuries. Ricardo, Lirio, and Blue Eyes arrive and with some help from Lirio, Blue Eyes's witch powers awaken and with them, she revives Ellis who in turn revives Nadie. With the cave collapsing, Ellis and Nadie pursue a fleeing Rosenberg. With the two girls facing off against him, Ellis, with Nadie's support, recites Nadie's favorite saying before shooting Rosenberg and ending the threat of Project Leviathan for good.
26	"A Woman Sparkling"; Transliteration: "Kagayaku Onna" (Japanese: 輝く女)	September 24, 2007
Some time after Rosenberg's death, Ellis and Nadie find themselves living with and working for a middle-aged husband and wife who run a small café, not knowing of the two girls' previous adventures. Having become accustomed to the lifestyle, Nadie finds herself as happy as ever, though Ellis senses that she misses life on the road. After an unexpected visit from Blue Eyes, the two girls find themselves along with Blue Eyes and the middle-aged couple being held up by the gay bounty hunters (now quite obese) from earlier episodes seeking revenge. After they are arrested, Ellis and Nadie decide that, despite an offer to stay where they are, their place is on the road and the two drive off seeking their next adventure.
