= List of Heroic Age episodes =

Heroic Age opening logo

This article is a list of episodes of the anime Heroic Age, which first aired on April 1, 2007. It is currently airing on Japanese networks such as TV Tokyo and TV Osaka.

The story focuses on a boy called Age, who has a powerful alternate form called Bellcross. Age happens to be a Nodos, which is a being entrusted with an essence of the Hero Tribe, a once powerful race. After Princess Dhianeila of the Iron Tribe, or mankind, visits his planet to ask for his help in defeating the Silver Tribe, who threatens the Iron Tribe's existence, he begins to fulfill the contract assigned to him by his "fathers", the great Golden Tribe.

== Episodes ==
No.	Title	Original release date
1	"The Ruined Planet"; Transliteration: "Horobi no Hoshi" (Japanese: 滅びの星)	April 1, 2007
When the human race, also called the Iron Tribe, is threatened with extinction, their princess, Dhianeila, searches for a being that will become their savior. They reach the ruined planet, Oron, and find a boy who calls himself Age. Although, they soon get attacked by the Bronze Tribe, but also witness the true power of their savior.
2	"The Forgotten Child"; Transliteration: "Wasurerareta Kodomo" (Japanese: 忘れられた子供)	April 8, 2007
After the destruction of his ship, Age is invited to go on the Argonaut. A ceremony is held in his honor, but Age disturbs everyone with his wild nature. It is not long after that they are once again attacked by the Bronze Tribe.
3	"The Heroic Tribe"; Transliteration: "Eiyū no Shuzoku" (Japanese: 英雄の種族)	April 15, 2007
Age is taught about humanity's history and also gets a makeover. As he explores the ship, the Argonaut is soon attacked, but this time, a member of the Silver Tribe becomes more involved in the battle.
4	"The Planet Titarros"; Transliteration: "Wakusei Titārosu" (Japanese: 惑星ティターロス)	April 22, 2007
The Argonaut tries to resupply on the planet Titarros, with the Silver Tribe in pursuit. In order to avoid alarming the populace with the presence of a Nodos, Iolaous and Age travel to the planet's surface. There, Age meets Karkinos, another Nodos vessel, who wants him to join the other Nodos.
5	"The Nodos"; Transliteration: "Nodosu" (Japanese: ノドス)	April 29, 2007
The Bronze Tribe nests attack the Argonaut and Titarros in order to destroy them both. Age summons Bellcross and saves them by destroying the Bronze Tribe nests, while still fighting Karkinos, who summons Lernaea.
6	"The Cemetery Belt"; Transliteration: "Semetarī Beruto" (Japanese: セメタリー·ベルト)	May 6, 2007
After the incident at Planet Titarros, other inhabited planets no longer want the Argonaut to enter into their territory, in hopes of preventing themselves from becoming enemies of the Silver Tribe. Without their help, the Argonaut has no other choice but to follow Princess Dhianeila's directions, and to have faith in Age's power to defeat the other Nodos.
7	"The Agreement"; Transliteration: "Keiyaku" (Japanese: 契約)	May 13, 2007
The battle between Age and Karkinos continues, while Mehitak reveals Artemia, his Heroic Tribe form. The Argonaut, along with Iolaous and the others, escapes the battlefield and leaves Age to fend for himself against the two enemy Nodos. After escaping, the Argonaut is attacked again, but a little unexpected help from Captain Mobeedo's past shows up too.
8	"The Flashing Nodos"; Transliteration: "Senkō no Nodosu" (Japanese: 閃光のノドス)	May 20, 2007
The Argonaut continues to flee from the Silver Tribe while the Azz-Azoth fleet facilitates their escape. Unfortunately, Mehitak makes another appearance and proves to have more tricks than he showed before. When the Argonaut is finally trapped by the Silver Tribe, Dhianeila is forced to take drastic action, endangering her own safety for the sake of the crew.
9	"The Return"; Transliteration: "Kikan" (Japanese: 帰還)	May 27, 2007
The battle between Age and Karkinos soon comes to end when Age gains the upper hand. Realizing that Karkinos is in trouble, Yuty orders Artemia to go assist him. Meanwhile, the Argonaut receives a coded message containing the location of a secret starway.
10	"The Hero of Solitude"; Transliteration: "Kodoku no Eiyū" (Japanese: 孤独の英雄)	June 3, 2007
Humans throughout the galaxy participate in a meeting to declare war against the Silver Tribe. Meleagros, Dhianeila's older brother, plans to use Age for his own gains. Meanwhile, the Silver Tribe orders their Nodos to exterminate the entire Iron Tribe.
11	"The Star of Brilliance"; Transliteration: "Kagayaki no Hoshi" (Japanese: 輝きの星)	June 17, 2007
Dhianeila tries to cheer up so others don't worry. Meanwhile, Age draws a future drawing on the Althaea, which Meleagros plans to use as propaganda. The Silver Tribe decides to take down Age and the Iron Tribe by sending Karkinos, Mehitak, and Lekty to attack.
12	"The Torch of Destruction"; Transliteration: "Hametsu no Kyoka" (Japanese: 破滅の炬火)	June 24, 2007
In the confrontation between the Iron and Silver Tribes, Meleagros and Atalantes let Age be their primary weapon. In an attempt to defeat the Silver Tribe, Meleagros orders the destruction of Io. Io crashes into Jupiter and ignites it. The Silver Tribe forms a larger barrier and pushes the flares back, detonating Jupiter and turning it into a ball of burning plasma, destroying most of the Iron Tribe's frontlines while suffering casualties themselves. Amidst the explosions, Age is fighting Karkinos when Lecty joins the battle.
13	"The Battle in the Space-Time Continuum"; Transliteration: "Jikūryū no Tatakai" (Japanese: 時空流の戦い)	July 1, 2007
While Karkinos keeps Age busy, Lecty, summoning Erymanthos, uses time manipulation to try to find an opportunity to take out Age, but exceeds her limits to do so. Meanwhile, Meleagros orders the Calydonian fleet to advance to Mars. The Argonaut arrives in an attempt to help.
14	"The Raging One"; Transliteration: "Araburumono" (Japanese: 荒ぶる者)	July 8, 2007
Suffering from Lecty's time manipulation attack, Age, as Bellcross, enters a state of mental chaos and begins to viciously assault Karkinos. Meanwhile, Meleagros, believing that his fleet is near invincible, continue to push forward, only to become surrounded. When the chaotic Age threatens to destroy both the Silver Tribe and Iron Tribe's fleets, Mehitak, calling forth Artemia, begins to fight him. In the midst of the chaos, Dhianeila finally rebels against her brothers and takes command of the Iron Tribe fleets, as the Argonaut heads to Mars.
15	"When the Light Falls"; Transliteration: "Hikari Furu Toki" (Japanese: 光降るとき)	July 15, 2007
Age, still as Bellcross, continues to become more chaotic, and the Silver Tribe finally comes to terms with their inability to control the situation, leaving Age and Mehitak, in their Heroic Tribe forms, to fight. The Argonaut enters the fray, and Dhianeila determines that the only way to control the situation is to take the Argonaut and go to Age. Mehitak is brutally defeated while Dhianeila confronts Age. She apologizes for leaving him alone and Age returns to his human form, ending the destruction of a chaotic Bellcross.
16	"Overcoming the Fates"; Transliteration: "Ikutsu no Sadame o Koete" (Japanese: 幾つの定めを超えて)	July 22, 2007
The Argonaut scouts Earth's surface. The Nodos discuss Mehitak's fate after learning of his defeat. Lecty overhears Prome O's theory that the Golden Tribe favors the Iron Tribe. Age and Mehitak both awaken, and Dhianeila meets with Mehitak. Dhianeila vows that Mehitak will no longer have to fight, and that they will liberate his people. Moved by this selfless vow, Mehitak swears that if they succeed, he will fight for the Iron Tribe.
17	"The Retributive Troops"; Transliteration: "Hōfuku no Gunzei" (Japanese: 報復の軍勢)	July 29, 2007
As Age and Mehitak get to know each other, Meleagros and Atalantes attempt to forcibly subdue a terminal planet. Meleagros and the Calydonian fleet move onto the system where the Bronze Tribe's home planet is at, engaging a large number of Bronze Tribe nests. The Silver Tribe decides to send their Nodos to attack Age while Yuty La learns about revenge from Karkinos. Karkinos explains that he stays because of a special someone, which confuses Yuty La. Age and the Argonaut move to engage the Bronze Tribe's forces, which are currently fighting the Calydonian fleet, while Yuty La is ordered by Romu Ro to attack Age.
18	"The Victorious Day"; Transliteration: "Shōri no Hi" (Japanese: 勝利の日)	August 5, 2007
As the Iron Tribe engages in a large scale fleet battle with the Bronze Tribe, they soon descend onto Tauron, the Bronze Tribe home world. The Silver Tribe does not defend or help the Bronze Tribe, deciding instead to figure out what the next objective of the Iron Tribe is. Prome O is pressed on what the Iron Tribe's driving goals are and she discloses that the Iron Tribe's emotional attachments are the same as the Golden Tribe's. As the planetary bombardment begins, Age realizes that the only Bronze Tribe left are noncombatants. Dhianeila realizes this as well, halting the attack before it becomes a genocide. The Iron Tribe fleets are poised to attack the Silver Tribe's home world next.
19	"The Invasion Between the Planet Systems"; Transliteration: "Seikeikan Shinkō" (Japanese: 星系間侵攻)	August 12, 2007
The Iron Tribe's fleets head for Codomos, the Silver Tribe's home world, splitting up to take all the planets in the system. Prome O feels his uneasiness and compares it to when the Golden Tribe left and when the Silver Tribe's uneasiness caused them to attack the Iron Tribe. Dhianeila decides to try contacting Phaetho O to determine exactly what are the motives of the Silver Tribe. Just as he locates the Argonaut, Dhianeila confronts him and he teleports his ship to the Argonaut in a panic, attacking the Argonaut as Yuty La reveals her Heroic Tribe form, Kervius, and moves to attack the Iron Tribe fleets.
20	"The Nodos of Darkness"; Transliteration: "Ankoku no Nodosu" (Japanese: 暗黒のノドス)	August 20, 2007
As Age destroys Phaetho O's ship as well as the Bronze Tribe nests that teleport in, Yuty La moves to attack the Iron Tribe fleets. Meleagros and Atalantes try to hold back Yuty La, but to no avail. Mehitak volunteers to help Age fight Yuty La, but the Silver Tribe and the Bronze Tribe lead a large counterattack. Age and Mehitak engages Yuty La in battle, and Karkinos comes out to fight as well. The battle gets larger, and in one of the attacks, destroys the Althaea, along with Meleagros, Atalantes, and the Calydonian fleet in it, which leads Nilval to declare a retreat. Dhianeila finally finds Prome O and wishes to speak with her. Meanwhile, the battle of Age and Yuty La seem to culminate in a large red explosion that dwarfs the others seen before.
21	"The Planet Codomos"; Transliteration: "Wakusei Codomosu" (Japanese: 惑星コドモス)	August 26, 2007
When the Argonaut warps in close to Codomos, Prome O creates a place for her to meet Dhianeila. Meanwhile, Age and Yuty La continue their battle, Mehitak supporting Age, with Karkinos looking on, and Lecty observing from a Silver Tribe ship, placing all five Nodos together for the first time. Dhianeila summons Iolaous, who uses his ability to teleport them both to the planet to meet with Prome O, with both sides listening in. They realize that the stars themselves created the starways, and that the Golden Tribe wished for the other tribes to know each other and to contact each other so they made the labors contradictory to each other in order to force conflict. Phaetho O is infuriated and attacks the Argonaut, but is thwarted when a large number of Silver Tribe ships protect them. Prome O gives Dhianeila the memories about the Golden Tribe's homeworld, Elysium.
22	"The Agreement of Death"; Transliteration: "Shi no Keiyaku" (Japanese: 死の契約)	September 2, 2007
Prome O shares her guarded memories of Elysium to Dhianeila because she has the unique ability to find galaxies without the help of a starway. Support for Prome O grows and the two tribes come to an agreement. If Dhianeila is unable to find the Golden Tribe's powers at Elysium, the Silver Tribe will continue to attack them. Dhianeila recognizes that this is the only chance to end the war with the Silver Tribe. The Argonaut prepares for their new destination. The battle between the Nodos rages on, making it more likely that either Age or Yuty La will enter into mental chaos, so Karkinos joins the battle. Karkinos is killed when defending a deadly attack intended for Kervius, which causes Yuty La to enter mental chaos.
23	"The Four"; Transliteration: "Yo Nin" (Japanese: 四人)	September 9, 2007
Dhianeila continues to guide the Argonaut through uncharted space towards Elysium. Romu Ro imprisons Yuty La aboard his ship, where she is overcome by her emotions over Karkinos's death. Within Yuty La's void of nothingness from Kervius, Age meets with Mehitak and Lecty. The gem containing Karkinos's Heroic Tribe form then appears and Karkinos is revived from death. The four Nodos contemplate their contracts and unite their powers to allow Age to escape the void. Phaetho O's forces attack the Argonaut, despite the objections of other Silver Tribe members. Dhianeila finally locates the path to Elysium, but Phaetho O warps in and prepares to destroy them with a final attack. Just as he fires, Age, as Bellcross, appears and blocks the beam allowing the Argonaut to warp away.
24	"Elysium"; Transliteration: "Eryushion" (Japanese: エリュシオン)	September 16, 2007
Age, Mehitak, Karkinos, and Lecty escape from the void of nothingness along with all the ships consumed by Yuty La's attacks. The four Nodos teleport to Phaetho O's ship to rest. En route to Elysium, the Argonaut is consumed by a strange electrical storm. Dhianeila believes the storm is a test of the Iron Tribes resolve. The Argonaut uses its main cannon to clear the storm and is brought to Elysium. Dhianeila travels to the planet surface. While exploring, she and her guards are confronted by Romu Ro who declares that there is nothing left of the Golden Tribe and will destroy the planet. Romu Ro's ship appears and crashes into the Argonaut forcing it to crash into the planet surface. While a mentally chaotic Kervius attack the planet's defenses, Romu Ro engages Dhianeila's guards. As Romu Ro prepares to destroy her, Age and the other Nodos appear.
25	"The Final Labor"; Transliteration: "Saigo no Keiyaku" (Japanese: 最後の契約)	September 23, 2007
The four Nodos reach Elysium and Lecty threatens Romu Ro not to destroy the humans. Kervius's mental chaos worsens and the four Nodos are forced to fight. As Romu Ro has sealed Yuty La's mind, the rest of the Silver Tribe cannot contact her to stop and the four Nodos are unable to triumph. Lecty encounters her past versions representing her past doubts and comes to realize that Age and Bellcross are the key to opening the door to the Golden Tribe, and Bellcross absorbs the planet's energy into itself with help from his past selves. Kervius is the door while Bellcross is the key to the portal and Bellcross succeeds in defeating Kervius and opening the portal, seemingly being welcomed by the Golden Tribe while his body shatters. The Golden Tribe are briefly seen while Karkinos revives Yuty La and they embrace. Dhianeila and the Argonaut see Bellcross's orb fall back to the ground from the portal only to have it shatter when touched by Dhianeila.
26	"Age"; Transliteration: "Eiji" (Japanese: エイジ)	September 30, 2007
The Silver Tribe, the Bronze Tribe, and the Iron Tribe fleets travel to Elysium. Phaetho O helps repair the Argonaut. Prome O and Dhianeila reunite. The Silver Tribe decides to go through the portal along with most of the Bronze Tribe and the remaining Nodos. Before leaving, Prome O gives Dhianeila the power of the Golden Tribe held by the Silver Tribe. Dhianeila decides to remain and work to restore the galaxy. Dhianeila becomes queen and unites all of humanity. The crew of the Argonaut use the Golden Tribe's power to end all war and destruction. Finally, the Argonaut returns to Oron to fulfill Age's wish. Four years pass, and Oron has been completely restored to its former glory. Dhianeila stands on the shore of the ocean and longs to see Age again. As she begins to leave, a portal appears above Oron and a beam of golden light descends to the ocean surface. Within the light, Age appears, saying that by restoring the planet, Dhianeila created a path for him to return. He extends his hand to Dhianeila, who rushes to him with tears in her eyes. At the moment their hands meet, they are engulfed in a blinding light. The portal above Oron disappears and the camera zooms out to reveal countless galaxies.
