= 2007 in animation =

2007 in animation is an overview of notable events, including notable awards, list of films released, television show debuts and endings, and notable deaths.

== Events ==
=== January ===
- January 4: American activist and animator Helen Hill is murdered by an unidentified intruder in her home.
- January 8: Qubo launches as a 24/7 channel.
- January 28: Season 11 of King of the Hill begins on Fox with the premiere of the episode "The Peggy Horror Picture Show". The season's premiere was seen by over 7.2 million viewers that night.
- January 31: The Boston bomb scare occurs and the U.S. Coast Guard and Boston Police shut down parts of Interstate 93, two bridges, and a section of the Charles River after the discovery of suspicious devices placed around the city. However, said devices turned out to be not bombs but rather marketing tools for Aqua Teen Hunger Force Colon Movie Film for Theaters.

=== February ===
- February 10: The final episode of Catscratch airs. Nickelodeon ceased reruns of the show without public explanation, putting it in obscurity ever since.
- February 18: Season 4 of Camp Lazlo begins on Cartoon Network with the premiere of the TV movie "Where's Lazlo?".
- February 19: Season 5 of SpongeBob SquarePants begins on Nickelodeon with the premiere of the episodes "Rise and Shine/Waiting" and "Sing a Song of Patrick". The season's premiere brought in a total of over 5 million viewers that night.
- February 23:
  - After nearly 8 years, Cartoon Network officially ends its Fridays block.
  - Camp Lazlo concludes its third season on Cartoon Network with the episodes "Scoop of the Century/Boxing Edward".
- February 25: 79th Academy Awards:
  - Happy Feet by George Miller wins the Academy Award for Best Animated Feature.
  - The Danish Poet by Torill Kove wins the Academy Award for Best Animated Short Film.

=== March ===
- March 5: The first episode of Shaun the Sheep airs.
- March 7: Season 11 of South Park begins on Comedy Central with the premiere of the episode "With Apologies to Jesse Jackson", where Randy Marsh says the "N-word" uncensored.
- March 15: Alan Becker releases "Animator vs Animation II" on Newgrounds
- March 25: Aqua Teen Hunger Force concludes its fourth season on Adult Swim with the episode "Carl Wash". An unfinished version of this episode secretly premiered on December 22, 2006.
- March 30:
  - The film Meet the Robinsons, co-produced by Walt Disney Animation Studios, is released.
  - The Grim Adventures of Billy & Mandy TV-movie "Billy & Mandy's Big Boogey Adventure" premieres on Cartoon Network.

=== April ===
- April 13: Aqua Teen Hunger Force Colon Movie Film for Theaters releases in theaters with mixed to highly-polarized reviews from critics.
- April 20: The second season of Shorty McShorts' Shorts airs on Disney Channel. It only had a limited run before its conclusion.
- April 28: The Ed, Edd n Eddy half-hour special "A Fistful of Ed" premieres on Cartoon Network. This episode was falsely advertised as the final episode of the series.

=== May ===
- May 4: Season 5 of Foster's Home for Imaginary Friends begins on Cartoon Network with the premiere of the episode "Cheese a Go-Go". It is the first part of the Cartoon Network crossover event titled Invaded.
- May 5: Tom and Jerry Tales concludes its first season on the Kids' WB block on The CW with the episodes "Piranha Be Loved by You/Spook House Mouse/Abracadumb".
- May 6: Shrek the Third is released by DreamWorks. It was deemed controversial for some of its adult situations inserted in a children's film and plagiarism regarding a joke used from Monty Python and the Holy Grail.
- May 11: Ed, Edd n Eddy concludes its fifth season on Cartoon Network with the half-hour special "The Eds are Coming, the Eds are Coming". This is the second part of the Cartoon Network crossover event titled Invaded.
- May 12: Johnny Test concludes its second season on the Kids' WB block on The CW with the episodes "The Good, the Bad & the Johnny/Rock-A-Bye Johnny".
- May 20:
  - King of the Hill concludes its 11th season on Fox with the following episodes:
    - "Bill, Bulk and the Body Buddies" (was watched by over 4 million viewers that night)
    - "Lucky's Wedding Suit" (was watched by over 5.2 million viewers that night)
  - The Simpsons concludes its 18th season on Fox with the following episodes:
    - "24 Minutes"
    - "You Kent Always Say What You Want" (400th episode)
      - Both episodes were watched by over 9.9 million viewers that night.
  - Family Guy concludes its fifth season on Fox with the episode "Meet the Quagmires". The episode was watched by over 9.1 million viewers that night. This was the final episode to have been directed by famed animator Dan Povenmire, as he left the show to go focus on production for his own series Phineas and Ferb (which aired its first episode three months later). Roger Smith from American Dad! makes a cameo at the end.
  - American Dad! concludes its third season on Fox with the episode "Joint Custody". The episode was watched by over 7.6 million viewers that night.
- May 23: Vincent Paronnaud's Persepolis, based on Marjane Satrapi's eponymous graphic novel, is first released.
- May 29: Cartoon Network ended its "CN City/Yes!" era and began its "Summer 2007" era.

=== June ===
- June 8: Ash Brannon and Chris Buck's Surf's Up is first released.
- June 22: Ratatouille, produced by Pixar and the Walt Disney Company, is first released.

=== July ===
- July 8: The Total Drama series premieres on Teletoon with its first season series Total Drama Island.
- July 21: The Simpsons Movie is first released. It gained much notoriety during the release owing to Bart Simpson's depicted nudity.
- July 24: The SpongeBob SquarePants episode "Squid Wood" premieres on Nickelodeon, thus concluding the fourth season of the show.

=== August ===
- August 13: American-Canadian animator Paul Boyd was shot and killed after wielding a bicycle chain at officers who came to respond to a disturbance involving him.
- August 17: The first episode of Phineas and Ferb airs as a sneak peek, following after the world premiere of the Disney Channel Original Movie, High School Musical 2. They both hold the record for being the most watched programs on Disney Channel, with the Phineas and Ferb episode being watched by over 10 million viewers.
- August 24: The final episodes of Danny Phantom premiere on Nickelodeon.

=== September ===
- September 4: The Scooby-Doo direct-to-video film Chill Out, Scooby-Doo! releases on DVD.
- September 7: The Kim Possible series finale "Graduation" premieres on Disney Channel.
- September 14:
  - Cartoon Network ended its "Summer 2007" era and began its "Fall" era.
  - The first episode of Upin & Ipin
  - The first episode of Out of Jimmy's Head airs on Cartoon Network, the continuation of Re-Animated. Due to the 2007 Writers Guild of America strike, only 20 episodes were produced. Cartoon Network consequently stopped airing the series on the channel and removed it from the website after its cancellation in 2008 as it met extremely negative reviews.
- September 21: The third & final season of Avatar: The Last Airbender begins on Nickelodeon with the premiere of the episode "The Awakening".
- September 22:
  - Season 3 of Johnny Test begins on the Kids' WB block on The CW with the premiere of the episodes "Johnny vs. Bling-Bling 3/Stinkin' Johnny".
  - The second & final season of Tom and Jerry Tales begins on the Kids' WB block on The CW with the premiere of the episodes "More Powers to You/Catch Me Though You Can't/Power Tom".
- September 23:
  - Season 19 of The Simpsons begins on Fox with the premiere of the episode "He Loves to Fly and He D'ohs", which guest stars Stephen Colbert and Lionel Richie. The episode was seen by over 9.5 million viewers that night.
  - Season 12 of King of the Hill begins on Fox with the premiere of the episode "Suite Smells of Excess". The episode was seen by over 7.8 million viewers that night.
  - Season 6 of Family Guy begins on Fox with the premiere of the first episode in the Star Wars trilogy parody "Blue Harvest". The episode was seen by just over 10.8 million viewers that night.
- September 28: The Phineas and Ferb episode "Lawn Gnome Beach Party of Terror" premieres on Disney Channel as another sneak peek, which marks the debut of the major characters: Buford Van Stomm & Stacy Hirano. This was the last episode to air before the show's official premiere in February 2008.
- September 30:
  - Family Guy's 100th episode "Movin' Out (Brian's Song)" premieres on Fox, the episode featured a controversial gag about Quagmire r*ping Marge Simpson from The Simpsons and then shooting her & her entire family after Homer caught them having sex, this gag lead to the executives at Fox to order the crew members of the respective shows to stop feuding with each other.
  - Season 4 of American Dad! begins on Fox with the premiere of the episode "The Vacation Goo". The episode was seen by over 6 million viewers that night.

=== October ===
- October 2: Tom and Jerry: A Nutcracker Tale releases on DVD. This was the final installment in the Tom and Jerry franchise to be produced by the cartoon's co-creator Joseph Barbera, due to his death from the previous year.
- October 18: The Three Robbers, based on a children's book by Tomi Ungerer, is released by Hayo Freitag.
- October 20: The live-action film with animated sequences Enchanted premiers.
- October 21: The horror anthology film Fear(s) of the Dark is first released, featured animated sequences by several well-known comics artists.

=== November ===
- November 2:
  - The first episode of Chowder airs on Cartoon Network.
  - Bee Movie by Simon J. Smith and Steve Hickner is first released.
- November 4: The Family Guy episode "Stewie Kills Lois" premieres on Fox; the episode features Stewie finally achieving his life-long dream of killing Lois once and for all, but the latter's revealed to still be alive at the end of the episode, thus leaving the show on a cliffhanger.
- November 9: The final episode of The Grim Adventures of Billy & Mandy airs on Cartoon Network.
- November 11:
  - The Codename Kids Next Door & The Grim Adventures of Billy & Mandy half-hour crossover special, "The Grim Adventures of the KND" premiered on Cartoon Network.
  - The King of the Hill episode "Death Picks Cotton" premieres on Fox. As the episode's name implies, it marks the death of Hank Hill's father Cotton.
  - The Family Guy episode "Lois Kills Stewie" premieres on Fox, which follows up from the events of "Stewie Kills Lois". Stan Smith & Avery Bullock from American Dad! make a cameo appearance in this episode.
- November 12: The first SpongeBob SquarePants television film, Atlantis SquarePantis, premiered on Nickelodeon, attracting 8.8 million viewers.
- November 14: South Park concludes its 11th season on Comedy Central with the episode "The List".
- November 23: SpongeBob SquarePants' 100th episodes "Banned in Bikini Bottom/Stanley S. SquarePants" premieres on Nickelodeon. Andrea Martin guest stars as Ms. Gristlepuss in the former episode while Christopher Guest guest stars as SpongeBob's cousin Stanley SquarePants in the latter episode.
- November 27: The film Futurama: Bender's Big Score is released.

=== December ===
- December 4: Animation studio Studio B Productions was acquired by DHX Media.
- December 27: Three Little Pigs is added to the National Film Registry.

== Awards ==
- Academy Award for Best Animated Feature: Happy Feet
- Academy Award for Best Animated Short Film: The Danish Poet
- Animation Kobe Feature Film Award: Paprika
- Annie Award for Best Animated Feature: Ratatouille
- Asia Pacific Screen Award for Best Animated Feature Film: 5 Centimeters Per Second
- BAFTA Award for Best Animated Film: Ratatouille
- César Award for Best Foreign Film: Waltz with Bashir
- Goya Award for Best Animated Film: Nocturna
- Japan Academy Prize for Animation of the Year: Tekkonkinkreet
- Japan Media Arts Festival Animation Grand Prize: Summer Days with Coo
- Mainichi Film Awards - Animation Grand Award: Summer Days with Coo

== Films released ==
- January 9 - Mosaic (United States)
- January 14 - Flatland the Film (United States)
- January 18 - Chicago 10 (United States)
- January 19:
  - From the Sea (Spain)
  - Land of the Child (Lebanon)
  - We Are the Strange (United States)
- January 23 - The Invincible Iron Man (United States)
- January 25:
  - One Night in One City (Czech Republic)
  - Yobi, the Five Tailed Fox (South Korea)
- January 31 - Snow White: The Sequel (United Kingdom, Belgium, and France)
- February 2 - Branimals (Brazil)
- February 6:
  - Cinderella III: A Twist in Time (United States)
  - A Very Pony Place (United States)
- February 16 - Monica's Gang in an Adventure in Time (Brazil)
- February 17 - JoJo's Bizarre Adventure: Phantom Blood (Japan)
- February 23:
  - Elias and the Royal Yacht (Norway)
  - Mobile Suit Gundam SEED Destiny: Special Edition IV - The Cost of Freedom (Japan)
- February 27 - Bratz Fashion Pixiez (United States)
- March 2 - Film Noir (United States and Serbia)
- March 3:
  - 5 Centimeters Per Second (Japan)
  - One Piece Movie: The Desert Princess and the Pirates: Adventures in Alabasta (Japan)
  - Strawberry Shortcake: Berry Blossom Festival (United States)
- March 10:
  - Doraemon: Nobita's New Great Adventure into the Underworld – The Seven Magic Users (Japan)
  - Hellboy: Blood and Iron (United States)
- March 13 - Barbie Fairytopia: Magic of the Rainbow (United States)
- March 14 - VeggieTales: Moe and the Big Exit (United States)
- March 22 - Mug Travel (South Korea)
- March 23 - TMNT (United States and Hong Kong)
- March 30 - Meet the Robinsons (United States)
- April 13 - Aqua Teen Hunger Force Colon Movie Film for Theaters (United States)
- April 21:
  - Detective Conan: Jolly Roger in the Deep Azure (Japan)
  - Shana of the Burning Eyes (Japan)
- April 24 - Princess of the Sun (France)
- May 10 - Two Times Lotte (Germany)
- May 17 - Papelucho and the Martian (Chile)
- May 18 - Shrek the Third (United States)
- May 25 - Going Nuts (Spain)
- May 30 - Initial D: Battle Stage 2 (Japan)
- June 1 - The Big Fighting between Wukong and God Erlang (China)
- June 5 - Highlander: The Search for Vengeance (Japan, Hong Kong, and United States)
- June 8:
  - Surf's Up (United States)
  - A Tale of Two Mozzies (Denmark)
- June 27 - Persepolis (France)
- June 29 - Ratatouille (United States)
- July 5 - Noah's Ark (Argentina and Italy)
- July 6 - The Warrior (China)
- July 7 - Genius Party (Japan)
- July 10 - Minushi (Canada)
- July 14 - Pokémon: The Rise of Darkrai (Japan)
- July 17 - Gladiformers - Transforming Gladiators (Brazil)
- July 19 - Isidoro, La Película (Argentina)
- July 21 - Piano no Mori: The Perfect World of Kai (Japan)
- July 27 - The Simpsons Movie (United States)
- July 28 - Summer Days with Coo (Japan)
- July 29 - Mazu (Taiwan)
- July 31 - Bratz Kidz: Sleep-Over Adventure (United States)
- August 4:
  - Care Bears: Oopsy Does It! (United States)
  - Naruto Shippuden: the Movie (Japan)
- August 14 - Doctor Strange (United States)
- August 28 - H. P. Lovecraft's The Dunwich Horror and Other Stories (Japan)
- September 1 - Evangelion: 1.0 You Are (Not) Alone (Japan)
- September 4:
  - Disney Princess Enchanted Tales: Follow Your Dreams (United States)
  - Chill Out, Scooby-Doo! (United States)
- September 15 - Clannad (Japan)
- September 18:
  - Barbie as the Island Princess (United States and Canada)
  - Superman: Doomsday (United States)
- September 20 - The Little King Macius (Poland, Germany, and France)
- September 29 - Sword of the Stranger (Japan)
- October 2:
  - Elf Bowling the Movie: The Great North Pole Elf Strike (United States)
  - Tom and Jerry: A Nutcracker Tale (United States)
- October 9:
  - Bratz: Super Babyz (United States)
  - VeggieTales: The Wonderful Wizard of Ha's (United States)
- October 11 - Nocturna (Spain, France and United Kingdom)
- October 13:
  - Budak Lapok (Malaysia)
  - The Chosen One (United States)
- October 14 - Year of the Fish (United States)
- October 16 - Plan Bee (United States)
- October 18 - The Three Robbers (Germany)
- October 19:
  - Appleseed Ex Machina (Japan)
  - Christmas Is Here Again (United States)
  - Tengers (South Africa)
  - The Ten Commandments (United States and Canada)
- October 25 - Lissi and the Wild Emperor (Germany)
- October 26 - Bal Ganesh (India)
- October 30 - LeapFrog: A Tad of Christmas Cheer (United States)
- November 1 - Legend of Nahuala (Mexico)
- November 2 - Bee Movie (United States)
- November 8 - Martín Fierro, La Película (Argentina)
- November 9 - Welcome Back Pinocchio (Italy)
- November 10 - Yes! Precure 5: Great Miraculous Adventure in the Mirror Kingdom! (Japan)
- November 16 - Beowulf (United States)
- November 20 - Garfield Gets Real (United States)
- November 21 - Enchanted (United States)
- November 22 - Donkey Xote (Spain)
- November 27:
  - Futurama: Bender's Big Score (United States)
  - The Land Before Time XIII: The Wisdom of Friends (United States)
- November 29 - Egon & Dönci (Hungary)
- November 30 - Winx Club: The Secret of the Lost Kingdom (Italy)
- December 5:
  - Go West! A Lucky Luke Adventure (France)
  - The Life of Buddha (Thailand)
- December 8 - RH+, The Vampire of Seville (Spain)
- December 14 - Quest for a Heart (Finland, Germany, United Kingdom, and Russia)
- December 20 - Cat City 2: The Cat of Satan (Hungary)
- December 21 - Amazon Jack (Denmark, Latvia, and Norway)
- December 22 - Bleach: The DiamondDust Rebellion (Japan)
- December 27 - Pulentos: The Movie (Chile)
- December 28:
  - Ilya and the Robber (Russia)
  - Return of Hanuman (India)
- Specific date unknown:
  - Alice in Wonderland: What's the Matter With Hatter? (United States)
  - Cosmic Boy (Brazil)
  - Friends Forever (India)
  - Jungle Book: Rikki-Tikki-Tavi to the Rescue (United States)
  - The Prince and the Pauper: Double Trouble (United States)
  - Ramses (Italy)
  - Ratatoing (Brazil)
  - Ségou Fanga (Tunisia)
  - The Three Musketeers: Saving The Crown (United States)

== Television series debuts ==
Date	Title	Channel	Year
January 5	Starveillance	E!	2007
January 8	Ellen's Acres	Cartoon Network	2007
January 12	Hidamari Sketch	TBS	2007
March 3	El Tigre: The Adventures of Manny Rivera	Nickelodeon	2007–2008
March 5	The Land Before Time	Cartoon Network	2007–2008
April 16	Wilbur	Discovery Kids	2007–2008
April 20	Pokémon: Diamond and Pearl	Cartoon Network	2007–2008
April 25	The Nutshack	Myx TV	2007–2011
May 12	My Friends Tigger & Pooh	Playhouse Disney	2007–2010
June 4	Creature Comforts America	CBS	2007
June 13	Lil' Bush	Comedy Central	2007–2008
June 24	Friday: The Animated Series	MTV2	2007
July 10	Rick & Steve: The Happiest Gay Couple in All the World	Logo	2007–2009
July 11	Code Monkeys	G4	2007–2008
August 13	Slacker Cats	ABC Family	2007
August 17	Phineas and Ferb (Note: The show first aired as a sneak preview after the premiere of High School Musical 2, it made its official premiere on February 1, 2008.)	Disney Channel	2007–2015; 2025–present
August 20	Yo Gabba Gabba!	Nickelodeon	2007–2015
August 31	Tak and the Power of Juju	Nickelodeon	2007–2009
September 3	Super Why!	PBS Kids	2007–2016
September 3	WordWorld	PBS Kids	2007–2011
September 3	WordGirl	PBS Kids Go!	2007–2015
September 8	Mama Mirabelle's Home Movies	PBS Kids	2007–2008
September 9	Lucy, the Daughter of the Devil	Adult Swim	2007
September 15	Care Bears: Adventures in Care-a-lot	CBS	2007–2008
September 23	Shorts in a Bunch	Nicktoons Network	2007
September 29	Back at the Barnyard	Nickelodeon	2007–2011
October 1	Happy Monster Band	Playhouse Disney	2007–2008
October 7	Edgar & Ellen	Nicktoons Network	2007–2008
October 13	The Future Is Wild	Discovery Kids	2007–2008
November 2	Chowder	Cartoon Network	2007–2010
November 3	DinoSquad	CBS	2007–2008
November 3	Sushi Pack	CBS	2007–2009
November 4	Xavier: Renegade Angel	Adult Swim	2007–2009
December 21	George of the Jungle	Cartoon Network	2007–2008
December 26	Transformers Animated	Cartoon Network	2007–2009
Specific date unknown	Pet Alien	Kabillion	2007

== Television series endings ==
Date	Title	Channel	Year	Notes
January 5	Firehouse Tales	Cartoon Network	2005–2007	Cancelled
January 23	Jakers! The Adventures of Piggley Winks	PBS Kids	2003–2007	Ended
February 5	Ellen's Acres	Cartoon Network	2007	Cancelled
February 9	Starveillance	E!	2007	Cancelled
February 10	Catscratch	Nickelodeon	2005–2007	Ended
February 14	JoJo's Circus	Playhouse Disney	2003–2007	Cancelled
March 1	Cartoon Alley	TCM	2004–2007	Cancelled
March 3	Pokémon: Battle Frontier	Cartoon Network	2006–2007	Ended
March 4	What's with Andy?	ABC Family	2001–2007	Ended
March 30	Celebrity Deathmatch	MTV2	1998–2007	Ended
March 30	Crank Yankers	Comedy Central	2002–2007, 2019–present	Cancelled, until revived in 2019.
April 1	Perfect Hair Forever	Adult Swim	2004–2007	Cancelled, remaining episodes aired between 2014 and 2022.
April 9	The Life and Times of Juniper Lee	Cartoon Network	2005–2007	Cancelled
May 5	Loonatics Unleashed	Kids' WB	2005–2007	Cancelled
May 16	12 oz. Mouse	Adult Swim	2005–2007, 2020	Ended, until revived in 2020.
May 25	Shorty McShorts' Shorts	Disney Channel	2006–2007	Cancelled
July 8	Friday: The Animated Series	MTV2	2007	Cancelled
July 14	Biker Mice from Mars	4Kids TV	2006–2007	Cancelled
July 22	Harvey Birdman, Attorney at Law	Adult Swim	2001–2007	Ended
July 23	Creature Comforts America	CBS	2007	Cancelled
August 24	Danny Phantom	Nickelodeon	2004–2007	Ended
September 1	American Dragon: Jake Long	Disney Channel	2005–2007	Ended
September 2	Play with Me Sesame	Noggin	2002–2007	Ended
September 7	Kim Possible	Disney Channel	2002–2007	Ended
September 14	Peep and the Big Wide World	Discovery Kids	2004–07	Cancelled, until revived by PBS Kids in 2010.
September 17	Slacker Cats	ABC Family	2007	Cancelled
September 27	Squirrel Boy	Cartoon Network	2006–2007	Cancelled
October 10	Maya & Miguel	PBS Kids Go!	2004–2007	Ended
October 31	The Koala Brothers	Playhouse Disney	2004–2007	Ended
November 9	The Grim Adventures of Billy & Mandy	Cartoon Network	2003–2007	Ended
November 11	Lucy, the Daughter of the Devil	Adult Swim	2007	Cancelled
November 14	Drawn Together	Comedy Central	2004–2007	Cancelled
November 28	Gerald McBoing-Boing	Cartoon Network	2005–2007	Cancelled
December 30	Shorts in a Bunch	Nicktoons Network	2007	Cancelled
Specific date unknown	Pet Alien	Kabillion	2007	Cancelled

== Television season premieres ==
Date	Title	Season	Channel
January 12	My Gym Partner's a Monkey	3	Cartoon Network
January 28	King of the Hill	11	Fox
February 2	Squirrel Boy	2	Cartoon Network
February 10	Kim Possible	4	Disney Channel
February 18	Camp Lazlo	4	Cartoon Network
February 19	SpongeBob SquarePants	5	Nickelodeon
March 7	South Park	11	Comedy Central
May 4	Foster's Home for Imaginary Friends	5	Cartoon Network
June 7	Class of 3000	2	Cartoon Network
July 14	Ben 10	4	Cartoon Network
September 3	Camp Lazlo	5	Cartoon Network
September 17	My Gym Partner's a Monkey	4	Cartoon Network
September 21	Avatar: The Last Airbender	3	Nickelodeon
September 22	Johnny Test	3	Kids' WB (The CW)
September 22	Tom and Jerry Tales	2	Kids' WB (The CW)
September 23	Family Guy	6	Fox
September 23	King of the Hill	12	Fox
September 23	The Simpsons	19	Fox
September 30	American Dad!	4	Fox

== Television season finales ==
Date	Title	Season	Channel
January 5	My Gym Partner's a Monkey	2	Cartoon Network
February 23	Camp Lazlo	3	Cartoon Network
March 25	Aqua Teen Hunger Force	4	Adult Swim (Cartoon Network)
April 20	Class of 3000	1	Cartoon Network
April 21	Ben 10	3	Cartoon Network
May 5	Tom and Jerry Tales	1	Kids' WB (The CW)
May 11	Ed, Edd n Eddy	5	Cartoon Network
May 12	Johnny Test	2	Kids' WB (The CW)
May 20	American Dad!	3	Fox
May 20	Family Guy	5	Fox
May 20	King of the Hill	11	Fox
May 20	The Simpsons	18	Fox
July 24	SpongeBob SquarePants	4	Nickelodeon
July 27	Mickey Mouse Clubhouse	1	Playhouse Disney (Disney Channel)
August 29	Camp Lazlo	4	Cartoon Network
August 31	My Gym Partner's a Monkey	3	Cartoon Network
October 29	The Replacements	1	Disney Channel
November 14	South Park	11	Comedy Central
November 23	Codename: Kids Next Door	6	Cartoon Network

== Births ==
=== January ===
- January 31: Tex Hammond, American artist, former actor and son of Grey DeLisle (voice of Lincoln Loud in seasons 3-4 of The Loud House and The Casagrandes, Fangbert in Vampirina, additional voices in Glitch Techs).

=== February ===
- February 23: Leah Mei Gold, American actress (voice of Sid Chang in The Loud House and The Casagrandes).

=== April ===
- April 8: Hadley Gannaway, American actress (voice of young Anna in Frozen II, Muffin in Deer Squad, Nana in The Chicken Squad, Quinn in Taz: Quest for Burger, Thalia Flint in the Monsters at Work episode "Little Monsters").
- April 20: Terrence Little Gardenhigh, American actor (voice of Ronathan in Madagascar: A Little Wild, Flash Fireson in Firebuds, John Patrick "Pat" Patterson in Fright Krewe).
- April 26: Presley Williams, American actress (voice of young Sandy Cheeks in The SpongeBob Movie: Sponge on the Run).

=== May ===
- May 9: Lily Sanfelippo, American actress (voice of Gwen Stacy / Ghost-Spider in Spidey and His Amazing Friends, Stacy Frick in Turning Red, Axl Ambrose in Firebuds, young Lilith Clawthorne in The Owl House episode "Young Blood, Old Souls").

=== August ===
- August 16: Seth Carr, American actor (voice of Calvin in Oni: Thunder God's Tale).
- August 27: Ariana Greenblatt, American actress (voice of young Velma Dinkley in Scoob!, Tabitha Templeton in The Boss Baby franchise).
- August 29: Jaiden Klein, American actress (voice of Felicia Hardy / Black Cat in Spidey and His Amazing Friends).
- August 31: Jason Maybaum, American actor (voice of young Squidward Tentacles in The SpongeBob Movie: Sponge on the Run, young Keys in Big City Greens, Fife in Summer Camp Island, Snefton in Wolfboy and the Everything Factory, Teddy VonTaker in Action Pack).

=== October ===
- October 22: Izaac Wang, American actor (voice of Buon in Raya and the Last Dragon, Sam Wing in Gremlins, Yuwen in Win or Lose).

=== November ===
- November 8: Micah Abbey, American actor (voice of Donatello in Teenage Mutant Ninja Turtles: Mutant Mayhem).

=== December ===
- December 4: Scarlett Estevez, American actress (voice of Esme Louise in If You Give a Mouse a Cookie, Izzy in The Grinch).

== Deaths ==
=== January ===
- January 4:
  - Helen Hill, American activist, writer, teacher, film director and animator (Scratch and Crow, The Florestine Collection), is murdered at age 36.
  - Steve Krantz, American film producer and writer (Spider-Man, Fritz the Cat, The Nine Lives of Fritz the Cat, Heavy Traffic), dies at age 83.
- January 8: Iwao Takamoto, American animator, film director, television producer and character designer (Walt Disney Company, Hanna-Barbera), dies at age 81 from a heart attack.
- January 14: Harvey Cohen, American composer and orchestrator (Walt Disney Animation Studios, Warner Bros. Animation), dies at age 55.
- January 26: Emanuele Luzzati, Italian painter, illustrator, animator and film director (La Gazza Ladra, Pulcinella, Il Flauto Magico, I paladini di Francia), dies at age 85.

=== February ===
- February 12: Warren Batchelder, American animator (Warner Bros. Cartoons, DePatie-Freleng, Peanuts specials), dies at age 89.
- February 14:
  - Ryan Larkin, Canadian animator (Walking, Street Musique) dies at age 63 from lung cancer.
  - Willy Moese, German comics artist and animator (Zauberlehrling, Blaff und Biene, Rolle und Robby), dies at age 79.
- February 15: Walker Edmiston, American voice actor (voice of Ernie the Keebler Elf from The Keebler Company, Squiddly Diddly and Yakky Doodle in Yogi's Ark Lark, various characters in Down and Dirty Duck, Inferno in The Transformers, Sir Thornberry in Adventures of the Gummi Bears, Whizzer in Spider-Man, Fire Lord Azulon in the Avatar: The Last Airbender episode "Zuko Alone", Marty in the Ben 10 episode "Permanent Retirement"), dies at age 81.

=== March ===
- March 3: Osvaldo Cavandoli, Italian cartoonist (creator of La Linea), dies at age 87.
- March 10: Richard Jeni, American comedian and actor (voice of Host in the Batman: The Animated Series episode "Make 'Em Laugh", himself in the Dr. Katz, Professional Therapist episode "Monte Carlo"), commits suicide at age 49.
- March 15: Natatcha Estébanez, Puerto Rican-born American television producer (Postcards from Buster), dies from sarcoma at age 45.
- March 20: John P. Ryan, American actor (voice of 'Buzz' Bronski in Batman: Mask of the Phantasm), dies at age 70.
- March 22: Elbert Tuganov, Estonian animator and film director (Little Peeter's Dream), dies at age 87.
- March 27: Maxwell Becraft, Canadian animator (Warner Bros. Animation, The Super Mario Bros. Super Show!, He-Man and the Masters of the Universe, Bucky O'Hare and the Toad Wars, Attack of the Killer Tomatoes, Duckman, Muppet Babies, Sonic the Hedgehog, X-Men), dies at age 62.

=== April ===
- April 11: Roscoe Lee Browne, American actor (voice of Francis in Oliver & Company, Kingpin in Spider-Man, Mr. Arrow in Treasure Planet, Dr. Anokye in Static Shock, Max Miles in Ring Raiders, Reekon and Merklyn in Visionaries: Knights of the Magical Light, Great Mystic Gnome in the Freakazoid! episode "Lawn Gnomes: Chapter IV – Fun in the Sun", Clarence St. John in The Proud Family episode "Wedding Bell Blues", Edward Zeddmore in The Real Ghostbusters episode "The Brooklyn Triangle", Friar Ferdinand in the Happily Ever After: Fairy Tales for Every Child episode "Rumpelstiltskin"), dies at age 84.
- April 14: Jim Thurman, American actor, writer, director, cartoonist, and producer (Sesame Street, Fat Albert and the Cosby Kids, Muppet Babies), dies at age 72.
- April 30: Tom Poston, American actor (voice of Capital City Goofball in The Simpsons episode "Dancin' Homer", Ralph and Burly Man in the Aaahh!!! Real Monsters episode "O'Lucky Monster", Roy in the Rugrats episode "Hair!", Mr. Popper in the King of the Hill episode "Now Who's the Dummy?", additional voices in Liberty's Kids), dies from respiratory failure at age 85.

=== May ===
- May 6:
  - Oscar Blotta, Argentine comics artist and animator (made the storyboard for Upa en Apuros), dies at age 88.
  - Reiko Okuyama, Japanese animator (Toei Animation), dies at age 70.
- May 22: Art Stevens, American animator and film director (Walt Disney Company), dies at age 92.
- May 25: Charles Nelson Reilly, American actor, comedian, director and drama teacher (host of Uncle Croc's Block, voice of Frank Frankenstone in The Flintstone Comedy Show, Killer in All Dogs Go to Heaven, All Dogs Go to Heaven: The Series and An All Dogs Christmas Carol, Hunch in Rock-a-Doodle, D.O.R.C. in Space Cats, Dutch Spackle in Goof Troop, King Llort in A Troll in Central Park, Mr. Dumpty in Babes in Toyland, Red Parrot Stan in Tom and Jerry: Shiver Me Whiskers, Minos in the Hercules episode "Hercules and the Minotaur", Edmund Haynes in the Rugrats episode "Game Show Didi", the Dirty Bubble in the SpongeBob SquarePants episode "Mermaid Man and Barnacle Boy II"), dies from pneumonia at age 76.

=== June ===
- June 4: Ray Erlenborn, American actor (voice of Rabbit in Winnie the Pooh Discovers the Seasons), and sound effects artist (Crusader Rabbit), dies at age 92.

=== July ===
- July 4: James Street, American child actor (second voice of Huckleberry Pie in Strawberry Shortcake, voice of Pepito in Madeline in Tahiti), dies at age 13.
- July 5: David Hilberman, American animator, film director and producer (Walt Disney Company, co-founder of UPA, Hanna-Barbera), dies at age 95.
- July 9: Charles Lane, American actor (voice of Georges Hautecourt in The Aristocats), dies at age 102.
- July 22: Alexander Tatarsky, Russian film director, animator, and producer (Plasticine Crow, Good Night, Little Ones!, Investigation Held by Kolobki, Turn off the Light!), dies at age 56.

=== August ===
- August 11: Roberto Gavioli, Italian animator (Once Upon a Time, The Night the Animals Talked), dies at age 81.
- August 13: Paul Boyd, American-Canadian animator (Ed, Edd n Eddy, 101 Dalmatians: The Series, Dragon Tales, Quack Pack, Aaagh! It's the Mr. Hell Show!, Kenny the Shark, ¡Mucha Lucha!, PB&J Otter, The Angry Beavers, Fetch! with Ruff Ruffman, The Simpsons, Pepper Ann), dies at age 39.

=== September ===
- September 5: Jack Valenti, American political advisor, lobbyist and president of the Motion Picture Association (voiced himself in the Freakazoid! episode "The Chip"), dies from a stroke at age 85.
- September 6: George Crenshaw, American comics artist and animator (Walt Disney Animation Studios), dies at age 89.
- September 7: Lee Ae-jung, Korean voice actress (dub voice of Chaca in The Emperor's New Groove), dies from brain cancer at age 20.
- September 21: Alice Ghostley, American actress (voice of Cassiopeia in Hercules, Cariba in Izzy's Quest for Olympic Gold, Hester Hen in the 101 Dalmatians: The Series episode "De-Vil Age Elder", Pandora Rickets in the Channel Umptee-3 episode "The U.F.O. Show"), dies at age 84.
- September 24: Hiroshi Ōsaka, Japanese animator, film director and producer, character designer and illustrator (Bones Animation Studio), dies at age 44.

=== October ===
- October 5: John Rice, American animator (Hanna-Barbera, The Berenstain Bears, Teen Wolf) and overseas supervisor (Hanna-Barbera, Meena, The Mask, Toonsylvania, God, the Devil and Bob, Lilo & Stitch: The Series, Tom and Jerry Tales, The Mighty B!), dies at an unknown age.
- October 12: Noel Coleman, English actor (narrator of Captain Pugwash), dies at age 87.
- October 30: Robert Goulet, American singer and actor (voice of Jaune-Tom in Gay Purr-ee, Asst. Coach Ferret in the My Gym Partner's a Monkey episode "Animal School Musical", himself in The Simpsons episode "$pringfield (or, How I Learned to Stop Worrying and Love Legalized Gambling)", and the Gary the Rat episode "Manrattan", singing voice of Mikey Blumberg in Recess and Wheezy in Toy Story 2), dies from pulmonary fibrosis at age 73.

=== November ===
- November 8: Motosuke Takahashi, Japanese film director, animator, character designer and storyboard artist (Tatsunoko Productions, Studio Pierrot), dies at age 66.
- November 25: Roberto Del Giudice, Italian voice actor (dub voice of Arsène Lupin III in Lupin III), dies at age 67.
- November 28: Donyo Donev, Bulgarian cartoonist, caricaturist, animator and comics artist (The Three Fools) (Trimata Glupaci), Chetirmata Glupaci, Umno Selo, dies at age 78.

=== December ===
- December 5: Peter Orton, English media entrepreneur and television producer (HiT Entertainment), dies from cancer at age 64.
- December 6: Ken Southworth, English animator (Walt Disney Company, MGM, Walter Lantz, Hanna-Barbera, Filmation, Clokey Productions, Warner Bros. Animation), dies at age 89.
- December 17:
  - Jack Zander, American animator (The Van Beuren Corporation, Terrytoons, Metro-Goldwyn-Mayer cartoon studio), dies at age 99.
  - Mel Leven, American composer and lyricist (wrote "Cruella de Vil" for One Hundred and One Dalmatians), dies at age 93.

=== Specific date unknown ===
- Juraj Korda, Australian animator (Li'l Elvis and the Truckstoppers, John Callahan's Quads!, Dogstar), dies at age 46.

== See also ==
- 2007 in anime
