= List of animated feature films of 2007 =

This is a list of animated feature films first released in 2007.

== List ==
Title	Country	Director	Production company	Animation technique	Type	Notes	Release date	Duration
5 Centimeters Per Second 秒速5センチメートル: アチェインオブショートストリーズアバウトゼアディスタンス (Byōsoku Go Senchimētoru: a chein obu shōto sutorīzu abauto zea disutansu)	Japan	Makoto Shinkai	CoMix Wave Inc.	Traditional			March 3, 2007	65 minutes
Alice in Wonderland: What's the Matter With Hatter?	United States	Ric Machin	BKN International	Computer			2007	47 minutes
Alvin and the Chipmunks	United States	Tim Hill	Fox 2000 Pictures; Regency Enterprises; Bagdasarian Company; Dune Entertainment	Computer / Live action	Theatrical		December 14, 2007	92 minutes
Anpanman: Purun, the Soap Bubble それいけ!アンパンマン シャボン玉のプルン	Japan	Hiroyuki Yano	Anpanman Production Committee; TMS Entertainment	Traditional			July 14, 2007	52 minutes
Appleseed Ex Machina; Ekusu makina	Japan	Shinji Aramaki	Digital Frontier	Computer			October 19, 2007	101 minutes
Aqua Teen Hunger Force Colon Movie Film for Theaters	United States	Matt Maiellaro; Dave Willis	Williams Street	Flash			April 10, 2007 (New York City); April 13, 2007	85 minutes
Bal Ganesh	India	Pankaj Sharma	Shemaroo Entertainment; Astute Media Vision	Computer			October 26, 2007	105 minutes
Barbie as the Island Princess	United States; Canada	Greg Richardson	Mattel Entertainment; Rainmaker Animation	Computer	Direct-to-video		September 18, 2007	85 minutes
Barbie Fairytopia: Magic of the Rainbow	United States; Canada	William Lau	Mainframe Entertainment; Mattel Entertainment	Computer	Direct-to-video		March 11, 2007 (Nickelodeon); March 13, 2007 (DVD)	75 minutes
Battle for Terra	United States	Aristomenis Tsirbas	IM Global; Snoot Toons	Computer			September 8, 2007 (TIFF); May 1, 2009 (United States)	85 minutes
Bee Movie	United States	Steve Hickner; Simon J. Smith	DreamWorks Animation	Computer			October 25, 2007 (New York City); November 2, 2007	91 minutes
Beowulf	United States	Robert Zemeckis	Shangri-La Entertainment; ImageMovers	Computer			November 5, 2007 (Westwood); November 16, 2007	114 minutes
The Big Fighting between Wukong and God Erlang (Wukong Da Zhan Er Lang Shen)	China	Hansen Liang		Computer			June 1, 2007	76 minutes
Billy & Mandy's Big Boogey Adventure	United States	Shaun Cashman; Kris Sherwood; Gordon Kent; Matt Engstrom; Eddy Houchins; Sue Perrotto; Robert Alvarez; Russell Calabrese; Phil Cummings; Mike Lyman; Christine Kolosov	Cartoon Network Studios	Traditional			March 30, 2007	80 minutes
Billy & Mandy: Wrath of the Spider Queen	United States	Matt Engstrom; Gordon Kent; Juli Murphy; Kris Sherwood	Cartoon Network Studios	Traditional			July 6, 2007	43 minutes
Bleach: The DiamondDust Rebellion 劇場版BLEACH The DiamondDust Rebellion もう一つの氷輪丸 (Gekijōban Burīchi Za Daiyamondo Dasuto Reberion Mō Hitotsu no Hyōrinmaru)	Japan	Noriyuki Abe	Studio Pierrot	Traditional			December 22, 2007	95 minutes
Bratz Fashion Pixiez	United States	Mucci Fassett	Lions Gate Entertainment	Computer	Direct-to-DVD		February 27, 2007	72 minutes
Bratz Kidz: Sleep-Over Adventure	United States	Sean McNamara	Lions Gate Entertainment	Computer	Direct-to-DVD		July 31, 2007	74 minutes
Bratz: Super Babyz	United States	Mucci Fassett	Mike Young Productions; MGA Entertainment	Computer	Direct-to-DVD		October 9, 2007	74 minutes
Branimals	Brazil	Paulo Munhoz	Panda Filmes	Traditional			February 2, 2007	77 minutes
Budak Lapok	Malaysia	Anwardi Datuk Jamil	Matahari Animation	Traditional			October 13, 2007	90 minutes
Care Bears: Oopsy Does It!	United States	Davis Doi	SD Entertainment; American Greetings; The Hatchery	Computer			December 20, 2006 (Australia); August 4, 2007	71 minutes
Cat City 2: The Cat of Satan; Macskafogó 2 – A sátán macskája	Hungary	Béla Ternovszky	Szerep Produkciós Iroda	Traditional			December 20, 2007	90 minutes
Chicago 10: Speak Your Peace	United States	Brett Morgen	Consolidated Documentaries; Participant Productions; River Road Entertainment; Curious Pictures	Traditional			January 18, 2007 (Sundance)	110 minutes
Chill Out, Scooby-Doo!	United States	Joe Sichta	Warner Bros. Animation	Traditional	Direct-to-video		September 4, 2007	73 minutes
The Chosen One	United States	Chris Lackey	X-42 Productions LLC	Flash			October 13, 2007	79 minutes
Christmas Is Here Again	United States	Robert Zappia	Renegade Animation	Flash	Direct-to-DVD		October 20, 2007 (Heartland Film Festival)	74 minutes
Cinderella III: A Twist in Time	United States	Frank Nissen	DisneyToon Studios	Traditional			February 6, 2007	70 minutes
Clannad	Japan	Osamu Dezaki	Toei Animation	Traditional			September 15, 2007	90 minutes
Cosmic Boy; Garoto Cósmico	Brazil	Alê Abreu	Estúdio Elétrico	Traditional			2007 (Anima Mundi); January 11, 2008	76 minutes
La Crisis Carnívora	Spain	Pedro Rivero		Traditional			October 8, 2007 (Sitges Film Festival); May 16, 2008 (Spain)	78 minutes
Dante's Inferno	United States	Sean Meredith	Dante Film LLC	Hand-drawn paper puppets			January 2007	78 minutes
Detective Conan: Jolly Roger in the Deep Azure	Japan	Yasuichiro Yamamoto	TMS Entertainment	Traditional			April 21, 2007	95 minutes
Disney Princess Enchanted Tales: Follow Your Dreams	United States	David Block	Disneytoon Studios	Traditional			September 4, 2007	56 minutes
Doctor Strange	United States	Patrick Archibald; Jay Oliva; Richard Sebast; Frank D. Paur	Marvel Enterprises	Traditional	Direct-to-video		August 14, 2007	76 minutes
Donkey Xote; Donkey Xote	Spain	José Pozo	Filmax Animation; Lumiq Studios; Acción Media; Don Quijote De La Mancha 2005, S.A. Bren Entertainment, S.A. Castelao Productions, S.A; TVE	Computer			November 22, 2007	90 minutes
Doraemon: Nobita's New Great Adventure into the Underworld 映画ドラえもん のび太の新魔界大冒険 〜7人の魔法使い〜 (Doraemon: Nobita no Shin Makai Daibōken ~Shichinin no Mahō Tsukai~)	Japan	Yukiyo Teramoto	Shin-Ei Animation	Traditional			March 10, 2007	112 minutes
Egon & Dönci; Egon és Dönci – Mindenütt jó, de legjobb otthon	Hungary	Magyar Ádám	Tax Free Film; AEnimaCGS	Computer			November 29, 2007	75 minutes
Elf Bowling the Movie: The Great North Pole Elf Strike	United States	Dave Kim; Rex Piano	Film Brokers International; Great Highway Company	Computer			October 2, 2007	82 minutes
Elias and the Royal Yacht; Elias og kongeskipet	Norway	Espen Fyksen; Lise I. Osvoll	Filmkameratene A/S	Computer			February 23, 2007	76 minutes
Enchanted	United States	Kevin Lima	Walt Disney Pictures; Josephson Entertainment; Right Coast Productions	Traditional / Live action			October 20, 2007 (London); November 21, 2007	107 minutes
Evangelion: 1.0 You Are (Not) Alone ヱヴァンゲリヲン新劇場版: 序 (Evangerion Shin Gekijōban: Jo)	Japan	Hideaki Anno; Masayuki; Kazuya Tsurumaki	Studio Khara	Traditional			September 1, 2007	98 minutes
Fear(s) of the Dark; Peur(s) du noir	France	Blutch Hincker; Charles Burns; Marie Caillou; Pierre di Sciullo; Lorenzo Mattotti; Richard McGuire	Prima Linea Productions	Traditional / Computer			October 21, 2007 (Rome Film Festival); February 13, 2008	85 minutes
Film Noir	United States; Serbia	D. Dud Jones; Risko Topaloski	EasyE Films	Computer		First Serbian animated feature	March 2, 2007	97 minutes
Flatland the Film	United States	Ladd Ehlinger Jr.	Flatland Productions	Computer	Direct-to-video		January 14, 2007	95 minutes
From the Sea; De profundis	Spain	Miguelanxo Prado	Continental Producciones; Desembarco Produccións; Zeppelin Filmes	Flash			January 19, 2007	75 minutes
Friends Forever	India	Mark A.Z. Dippé	Davis Entertainment; Paws, Inc. The Animation Picture Company	Computer				
Futurama: Bender's Big Score	United States	Dwayne Carey-Hill	The Curiosity Company; 20th Century Fox Television	Traditional	Direct-to-video		November 27, 2007; March 5, 2008 (Australia); April 7, 2008 (United Kingdom)	89 minutes
Garfield Gets Real	United States	Mark A.Z. Dippé	Davis Entertainment; Paws, Inc. The Animation Picture Company	Computer	Direct-to-video		November 20, 2007	77 minutes
Genius Party	Japan		Studio 4°C	Traditional			July 7, 2007	85 minutes
Gladiformers; Gladiformers – Robos Gladiatores	Brazil	Michelle Gabriel	Video Brinquedo	Computer	Direct-to-video		July 17, 2007	70 minutes
Going Nuts; Gritos en el pasillo	Spain	Juan José Ramírez Mascaró	Perro Verde Films; Producciones Bajo la Lluvia	Puppets			July 17, 2006 (Festival de Cine Chico Isla de La Palma); May 25, 2007	75 minutes
Go West: A Lucky Luke Adventure; Tous à l'Ouest: Une aventure de Lucky Luke	France	Olivier Jean Marie	Xilam	Traditional			December 5, 2007	90 minutes
Granny Yozhka and Others; Бабка Ёжка и другие (Babka Yozhka i drugiye)	Russia	Valeriy Ugarov	United Multimedia Projects	Traditional			February 21, 2008	70 minutes
H. P. Lovecraft's The Dunwich Horror and Other Stories; H・P・ラヴクラフトのダニッチ・ホラー その他の物語 (Ecchi Pī Ravukurafuto no Danicchi Horā Sonota no Monogatariy)	Japan	Ryo Shinagawa	Toei Animation	Stop motion			August 28, 2007	46 minutes
Hellboy: Blood and Iron	United States	Victor Cook; Tad Stones	IDT Entertainment	Traditional			March 10, 2007	75 minutes
Highlander: The Search for Vengeance	Japan; Hong Kong; United States	Yoshiaki Kawajiri	Imagi Animation Studios; Davis-Panzer Productions; Madhouse	Traditional			June 5, 2007	95 minutes (Director's Cut); 85 minutes (International)
Ilya and the Robber; Илья Муромец и Соловей Разбойник (Ilya Muromets i Solovey Razboynik)	Russia	Vladimir Toropchin	Melnitsa Animation Studio	Traditional			December 28, 2007	80 minutes
Initial D: Battle Stage 2 頭文字〈イニシャル〉D BATTLE STAGE 2	Japan	Tsuneo Tominaga	Frontline	Traditional			May 30, 2007	80 minutes
The Invincible Iron Man	United States	Patrick Archibald; Jay Oliva; Frank D. Paur	Marvel Studios	Traditional	Direct-to-video		January 23, 2007	83 minutes
Isidoro, La Película	Argentina	José Luis Massa		Traditional			July 19, 2007	80 minutes
JoJo's Bizarre Adventure: Phantom Blood ジョジョの奇妙な冒険 ファントム ブラッド (JoJo no Kimyo na Bōken: Phantom Blood)	Japan	Junichi Hayama	Studio APPP	Traditional			February 17, 2007	100 minutes
Jungle Book: Rikki-Tikki-Tavi to the Rescue	United States	Rick Ungar	BKN International	Computer				
Amazon Jack a.k.a. Jungo Goes Bananas; Jungledyret Hugo – Fræk, Flabet og Fri	Denmark; Latvia; Norway	Flemming Quist Møller	A. Film A/S; Per Holst Film	Computer			December 2, 2007	72 minutes
Karol	Italy	Orlando Corradi	Mondo TV	Computer			2007	73 minutes
Krakatuk	Russia			Computer			2007	85 minutes
Kong: Return to the Jungle	United States	Stuart Evans	BKN International	Computer	Direct-to-DVD		2007	81 minutes
The Land Before Time XIII: The Wisdom of Friends	United States	Jamie Mitchell	Universal Animation Studios	Traditional			November 27, 2007	76 minutes
Land of the Child أرض الطف (Ard Al Taaf)	Lebanon	Ahmed Homani	Onyx Films; Sola Digital Arts	Computer		First Lebanese animated feature	January 19, 2007	
LeapFrog: A Tad of Christmas Cheer	United States	Roy Allen Smith	LeapFrog; PorchLight Entertainment	Traditional	Direct-to-video		October 30, 2005	31 minutes
Legend of the Sea 东海战 (Dōnghǎi-zhàn)	Singapore; China; United States	JJ Lin; Rynn Linn; Jin Sha; Vivian Tan Pei Ying	Cubix International; Kosmic Film Entertainment; Media Development Authority of Singapore; Zhongnan Animation Video	Computer			June 7, 2007	76 minutes
Legend Quest: The Legend of The Nahuala; La leyenda de la nahuala	Mexico	Ricardo Arnaiz	Animex Producciones; Nahuala Producciones; Finecine	Traditional			November 1, 2007	82 minutes
The Life of Buddha ประวัติพระพุทธเจ้า (Phra Phuttajao)	Thailand	Kritsaman Wattananarong	Mono Film	Traditional			December 5, 2007 (Thailand)	100 minutes
Lissi and the Wild Emperor; Lissi und der wilde Kaiser	Germany	Michael Herbig	CA Scanline Production herbX film	Computer			October 25, 2007	85 minutes
The Little King Macius; Król Maciuś Pierwszy; Der Kleine König Macius – Der Film	Poland; Germany; France	Sandor Jesse; Lutz Stützner	Saxonia Entertainment; Studio 88; Studio Orange Reklamy ki.ka HMM	Traditional			September 20, 2007	83 minutes
Martín Fierro, La Película	Argentina	Liliana Romero; Norman Ruiz		Traditional			November 8, 2007	88 minutes
Max & Co	Switzerland; Belgium; France; United Kingdom	Samuel Guillaume; Frédéric Guillaume	MAX-LeFilm-Sàrl; Ciné-Manufacture SA; Nexus Factory; Future Films; With The Support of: CNC; Fonds Government of Belgium Tax Shelter; Fonds Suisse Regio Films; Television Suisse Romande	Stop motion			June 11, 2007 (Annecy); February 6, 2008 (Belgium); February 13, 2008 (France)	76 minutes
Mazu 海之傳說─媽祖 (Hǎi zhī chuánshuō-Mǎzǔ)	Taiwan	Lin Shih-Jen	Chinese Cartoon Production	Traditional			July 29, 2007	
Meet the Robinsons	United States	Steve Anderson	Walt Disney Animation Studios	Computer			March 25, 2007 (El Capitan Theatre); March 30, 2007	94 minutes
Minushi	Canada	Tyler Gibb		Flash			July 10, 2007	94 minutes
Mobile Suit Gundam SEED Destiny: Special Edition IV – The Cost of Freedom 機動戦士ガンダムSEED DESTINY スペシャルエディション完結編 自由の代償 (Kidou Senshi Gundam SEED Destiny Special Edition Kanketsuhen: Jiyuu no Daishou)	Japan	Mitsuo Fukuda	Sunrise	Traditional			February 23, 2007	90 minutes
Monica's Gang in an Adventure in Time; Turma da Mônica em Uma Aventura No Tempo	Brazil	Mauricio de Sousa	Mauricio de Sousa Produções; Diler & Associados; Labocine Digital; Miravista	Flash			February 16, 2007	80 minutes
Mosaic	United States	Roy Allen Smith	POW! Entertainment; Film Roman; Manga Entertainment	Traditional			January 9, 2007	72 minutes
Mug Travel 빼꼼의 머그잔 여행 (Bbaekkom-ui meogeu-jan yeohaeng)	South Korea	Lim Ah-ron	RG Animation Studios	Computer			March 22, 2007	76 minutes
My Little Pony: A Very Pony Place	United States	John Grusd	SD Entertainment; Hasbro Entertainment	Traditional	Direct-to-video		February 6, 2007	46 minutes
Naruto Shippuden: the Movie 劇場版 NARUTO -ナルト- 疾風伝 (Gekijōban Naruto Shippūden)	Japan	Hajime Kamegaki	Studio Pierrot	Traditional			August 4, 2007	95 minutes
Nezumi Monogatari: George To Gerald no Bouken	Japan	Masami Hata	Sanrio	Traditional			December 22, 2007	52 minutes
Noah's Ark; El Arca	Argentina; Italy	Juan Pablo Buscarini	Patagonik Film Group	Traditional / Computer			July 5, 2007	88 minutes
Nocturna	Spain; France	Adrià García; Víctor Maldonado	Filmax Animation; AnimaKids Productions; Castelao Productions, S.A; Bren Entertainment, S.A; Gébéka Films; TVE; Canal+ Cine Cinema	Traditional			October 11, 2007	88 minutes
One Night in One City; Jedné noci v jednom městě	Czech Republic	Jan Balej	HAFAN film MAUR Film	Stop motion			January 25, 2007	75 minutes
One Piece Movie: The Desert Princess and the Pirates: Adventures in Alabasta 劇場版ワンピース エピソードオブアラバスタ 砂漠の王女と海賊たち (Gekijōban Wan Pīsu: Episōdo Obu Arabasuta: Sabaku no Ōjo to Kaizokutachi)	Japan	Takahiro Imamura	Toei Animation	Traditional			March 3, 2007	90 minutes
Our Miranda; Nuestro Miranda	Venezuela	Jean Charles L'Ami	Tango Brothers Producciones	Stop motion		First Venezuelan animated feature	2007	60 minutes
Papelucho and the Martian; Papelucho y el Marciano	Chile	Alejandro Rojas	Cine Animadores; Canal 13 Films	Traditional			May 17, 2007	77 minutes
Persepolis	France	Marjane Satrapi; Vincent Paronnaud	The Kennedy/Marshall Company	Traditional			May 23, 2007 (Cannes); June 27, 2007	96 minutes
Piano no Mori: The Perfect World of Kai ピアノの森 (Piano no Mori)	Japan	Masayuki Kojima	Madhouse	Traditional			July 21, 2007	101 minutes
Plan Bee	United States	Michael Schelp	Spark Plug Entertainment	Computer	Direct-to-video		October 17, 2007	50 minutes
Pokémon: The Rise of Darkrai 劇場版ポケットモンスター ダイヤモンド&パール ディアルガVSパルキアVSダークライ (Gekijōban Poketto Monsutā Daiyamondo Pāru Diaruga tai Parukia tai Dākurai)	Japan	Kunihiko Yuyama	OLM, Inc. OLM Digital	Traditional			July 14, 2007	90 minutes
The Prince and the Pauper: Double Trouble	United States	Ric Machin	BKN International	Computer			2007	50 minutes
Princess of the Sun; La Reine Soleil	Belgium; France; Hungary	Philippe Leclerc	France 3 Cinéma; Cinemon Entertainment; Greykid Pictures	Traditional			April 24, 2007	77 minutes
Puberty: The Movie	United States	Ken McIntyre	Naked Bear Films	Flash			March 29, 2007	72 Minutes
Pulentos: The Movie; Pulentos, la película	Chile	Julio Pot	Canal 13 Films	Traditional / Flash			December 25, 2007	75 minutes
Quest for a Heart; Röllin sydän	Finland; Germany; United Kingdom; Russia	Pekka Lehtosaari	Matila Röhr Productions	Traditional			December 14, 2007	78 minutes
Ramses	Italy	Orlando Corradi	Mondo TV; SEK Studio	Traditional			2007	95 minutes
Ratatoing	Brazil	Michelle Gabriel	Video Brinquedo	Computer	Direct-to-video		2007	44 minutes
Ratatouille	United States	Brad Bird	Pixar Animation Studios	Computer			June 22, 2007 (Kodak Theatre); June 29, 2007	111 minutes
Return of Hanuman	India	Anurag Kashyap	Percept Picture Company; Toonz Animation; Anurag Kashyap Films	Traditional			December 28, 2007	110 minutes
RH+, The Vampire of Seville; RH+, enl vampiro de Sevilla	Spain	Antonio Zurera	M5 Audiovisual; Milimetros Feature Animation	Traditional			December 8, 2007	80 minutes
Robin Hood: Quest For The King	United States	Ric Machin	BKN International	Computer			February 22, 2007	47 minutes
The Secret of the Magic Gourd	China	John Chu; Frankie Chung	Walt Disney Pictures; Centro Digital Pictures Limited	Computer / Live action			June 29, 2007	85 minutes
Ségou Fanga سيغو فانغا	Tunisia	Mambaye Coulibaly; Abdelkader Belhadi	Sanitilavielm	Traditional			2007	80 minutes
Shana of the Burning Eyes 劇場版 灼眼のシャナ (Shakugan no Shana)	Japan	Takashi Watanabe	J.C.Staff	Traditional			April 21, 2007	90 minutes
Shrek the Third	United States	Chris Miller	DreamWorks Animation; PDI/DreamWorks	Computer			May 6, 2007 (Mann Village Theatre); May 18, 2007	93 minutes
The Simpsons Movie	United States	David Silverman	20th Century Fox Animation; Gracie Films	Traditional			July 21, 2007 (Springfield); July 27, 2007	87 minutes
Snow White: The Sequel; Blanche-Neige, la suite	Belgium; France; United Kingdom	Picha	YC Alligator Film	Traditional			January 31, 2007	82 minutes
Strawberry Shortcake: Berry Blossom Festival	United States	Caillou Scott	DIC Entertainment; American Greetings	Traditional	Direct-to-video		May 1, 2007	44 minutes
Strawberry Shortcake: Let's Dance	United States	Karen Hydendahl, Hazel Rudd	DIC Entertainment; American Greetings	Traditional	Direct-to-video		October 2, 2007	45 minutes
Summer Days with Coo 河童のクゥと夏休み (Kappa no ku to natsu yasumi)	Japan	Keiichi Hara	Shin-Ei Animation	Traditional			July 28, 2007	138 minutes
Superman: Doomsday	United States	Bruce Timm; Lauren Montgomery; Brandon Vietti	Warner Bros. Animation	Traditional	Direct-to-video		September 18, 2007	77 minutes
Surf's Up	United States	Ash Brannon; Chris Buck	Sony Pictures Animation	Computer			June 8, 2007	85 minutes
Sword of the Stranger ストレンヂア 無皇刃譚 (Sutorenja Mukouhadan)	Japan	Masahiro Andō	Bones	Traditional			September 29, 2007	102 minutes
A Tale of Two Mozzies; Cykelmyggen of Dansemyggen	Denmark	Jannik Hastrup; Flemming Quist Møller	Dansk Tegnefilm	Flash			June 8, 2007	79 minutes
The Ten Commandments	United States; Canada	John Stronach; Bill Boyce	Huhu Studios iVL Animation; Sparky Animation; Ten Chimneys Entertainment	Computer			October 19, 2007	88 minutes
Tengers	South Africa	Michael J. Rix	Mirror Mountain Pictures	Stop motion		First South African animated feature	October 19, 2007	68 minutes
Tetsujin28: Morning moon of Midday 鉄人28号 白昼の残月 (Tetsujin Nijūhachi-gō: Hakuchū no Zangetsu)	Japan	Yasuhiro Imagawa	Palm Studio	Traditional			March 31, 2007	95 minutes
The Three Musketeers: Saving The Crown	United States	Ric Machin	BKN International	Computer			2007	48 minutes
The Three Robbers; Die drei Räuber	Germany	Hayo Freitag	Animation X Gesellschaft zur Produktion von Animationsfilmen mbH	Traditional			October 18, 2007	75 minutes
TMNT	United States; Hong Kong	Kevin Munroe	Imagi Animation Studios	Computer			March 17, 2007 (Grauman's Chinese Theatre); March 23, 2007 (United States)	87 minutes
Tom and Jerry: A Nutcracker Tale	United States	Spike Brandt; Tony Cervone	Warner Bros. Animation	Traditional	Direct-to-video		October 2, 2007	48 minutes
Transformers	United States	Michael Bay	Paramount Pictures; DreamWorks Pictures; Hasbro; Di Bonaventura Pictures	Computer / Live action			July 3, 2007	143 minutes
Two Times Lotte; Das doppelte Lottchen	Germany	Toby Genkel		Traditional			May 10, 2007	80 minutes
VeggieTales: Moe and the Big Exit	United States	Brian Roberts	Big Idea Productions	Computer	Direct-to-video		March 14, 2007	52 minutes
VeggieTales: The Wonderful Wizard of Ha's	United States	Brian Roberts	Big Idea Productions	Computer	Direct-to-video		October 9, 2007	49 minutes
Vexille – 2077 Isolation of Japan ベクシル 2077日本鎖国 (Bekushiru 2077 Nihon sakoku)	Japan	SORI	Oxybot	Computer			August 18, 2007	111 minutes
The Warrior 勇士	China		Shanghai Animation Film Studio	Traditional			July 6, 2007	
We Are the Strange	United States	M dot Strange		Stop motion / Computer			January 19, 2007	88 minutes
Welcome Back Pinocchio; Bentornato Pinocchio	Italy	Orlando Corradi	Mondo TV; SEK Studio	Traditional			November 9, 2007	91 minutes
Winx Club: The Secret of the Lost Kingdom; Winx Club – Il Segreto Del Regno Perduto	Italy	Iginio Straffi	Rainbow S.p.A. Rai Fiction	Computer			November 30, 2007	95 minutes
Year of the Fish	United States	David Kaplan	Funny Cry Happy	Rotoscope			October 14, 2007 (Austin Film Festival)	96 minutes
Yes! Precure 5: Great Miraculous Adventure in the Mirror Kingdom! Yes!プリキュア5 鏡の国のミラクル大冒険! (Yes! Precure 5: Kagami no Kuni no Miracle Daibōken!)	Japan	Tatsuya Nagamine	Toei Animation	Traditional			November 10, 2007	70 minutes
Yobi, the Five Tailed Fox 천년여우 여우비 (Chunnyun-yeowoo Yeowoobi)	South Korea	Lee Sung-gang	Sunwoo Entertainment; Yellow Film; Korean Film Council	Traditional			January 25, 2007	85 minutes

== Highest-grossing films ==
The following is a list of the 10 highest-grossing animated feature films first released in 2007.

Highest-grossing films of 2007
Rank	Title	Studio	Worldwide gross	Ref.
1	Shrek the Third	DreamWorks Animation / Paramount Pictures	$798,958,162	
2	Ratatouille	Disney / Pixar	$620,702,951	
3	The Simpsons Movie	Fox / Gracie Films	$527,071,022	
4	Bee Movie	DreamWorks Animation / Paramount Pictures	$287,594,577	
5	Meet the Robinsons	Disney / Walt Disney	$169,333,034	
6	Surf's Up	Columbia / Sony Pictures Animation	$149,044,513	
7	TMNT	Imagi	$95,608,995	
8	Pokémon: The Rise of Darkrai	OLM	$42,496,749	
9	Happily N'Ever After	Lionsgate Films / Vanguard	$38,085,778	
10	Doraemon: Nobita's New Great Adventure into the Underworld	Toho	$36,400,000	

== See also ==
- List of animated television series of 2007
