= 2007 in anime =

Events in 2007 in anime.

== Events ==
In this year, home video sales of anime DVDs in Japan were worth 89.4 billion yen.

== Accolades ==
At the Mainichi Film Awards, Summer Days with Coo won the Animation Film Award and A Country Doctor won the Ōfuji Noburō Award. Tekkon Kinkreet won the Japan Academy Prize for Animation of the Year; the other nominees were Evangelion: 1.0 You Are (Not) Alone, Summer Days with Coo, Piano no Mori and Detective Conan: Jolly Roger in the Deep Azure. Internationally, 5 Centimeters Per Second won the first ever Asia Pacific Screen Award for Best Animated Feature Film, with one of the other two nominees being Summer Days with Coo.

== Releases ==
=== Films ===
A list of anime that debuted in theaters between January 1 and December 31, 2007.

Release date	Title	Studio	Director	Running time (minutes)	Alternate name	Ref
February 14	Highlander: The Search for Vengeance	Madhouse	Yoshiaki Kawajiri	86	Hairandā	
February 17	JoJo's Bizarre Adventure: Phantom Blood	A.P.P.P.	Junichi Hayama	90	Jojo no kimyō na bōken: fantomu Buraddo	
March 3	5 Centimeters per Second	CoMix Wave Inc.	Makoto Shinkai	62	Byōsoku 5senchi mētoru	
March 3	One Piece: Episode of Alabasta - The Desert Princess and the Pirates	Toei Animation	Takahiro Imamura	90	Gekijō-ban wan pīsu episōdo obu arabasuta: sabaku no ōjo to kaizoku-tachi	
March 10	Doraemon: Nobita's New Great Adventure into the Underworld	Shin-Ei Animation	Kōzō Kusuba (chief); Yukiyo Teramoto	112	Eiga Doraemon Nobita no shin makai daibōken ~ 7-ri no mahōtsukai ~	
March 17	Chō Gekijōban Keroro Gunsō 2: Shinkai no Princess de Arimasu!	Sunrise	Junichi Sato (chief); Susumu Yamaguchi	78	Chō gekijō-ban keroro gunsō 2: shinkai no purinsesu de arimasu!	
March 21	Fashionable Witches Love and Berry: Magic of Happiness	TMS Entertainment	Tomomi Mochizuki	51	Oshare majo rabu ando berī shiawase no ma hō	
March 31	Tetsujin 28-gou: Hakuchuu no Zangetsu	Palm Studio	Yasuhiro Imagawa	95	Tetsujin 28-gō hakuchū no zangetsu	
April 7	Japan, Our Homeland	WAO World	Akio Nishizawa	96	Furusato japan	
April 21	Crayon Shin-chan: Fierceness That Invites Storm! The Singing Buttocks Bomb	Shin-Ei Animation	Yūji Mutō	102	Eiga Kureyon shinchan arashi o yobu utau ketsu dake bakudan	
April 21	Detective Conan: Jolly Roger in the Deep Azure	TMS Entertainment	Yasuichiro Yamamoto	105	Meitantei konan: konpeki no jorī rojā	
April 21	Inukami! The Movie	Seven Arcs	Keizō Kusakawa	26	Inu kami~tsu! The mūbī tokumei reiteki sōsa-kan kana Shirō ~tsu!	
April 21	Kino no Tabi: The Beautiful World - Byouki no Kuni - For You	Shaft	Ryutaro Nakamura	28	Kino no tabi - the byūtifuru wārudo - byōki no kuni - For You -	
April 21	Shakugan no Shana: The Movie	J.C.Staff	Takashi Watanabe	86	Gekijō-ban shakugan no shana	
April 28	Fist of the North Star: Raoh Side Story Fierce Fighting Arc	TMS Entertainment	Toshiki Hirano	89	Ma kyūseishu densetsu hokuto no kobushi Raō-den gekitō no shō	
May 19	Shin SOS Dai Tokyo Tankentai	Sunrise	Shinji Takagi	41	Shin esuōesu dai Tōkyō tanken-tai	
June 23	Kiddy Grade: Maelstrom	asread; Gonzo	Keiji Gotō	80	Kodakku gureido The movuie pātsu 2: Ōbāfurō no shō	
July 15	Pokémon: The Rise of Darkrai	OLM	Kunihiko Yuyama	90	Poketto monsutā daiyamondo & pāru diaruga VS parukia VS dākurai	
July 21	The Piano Forest	Madhouse	Masayuki Kojima	100	Piano no mori The pāfekuto wārudo of Kai	
August 4	Naruto Shippuden the Movie	Pierrot	Hajime Kamegaki	94	Gekijō-ban naruto - naruto - shippuden	
August 18	Vexille	Oxybot	Fumihiko Sori	109	Bekushiru 2077 Nihon sakoku	
September 1	Evangelion: 1.0 You Are (Not) Alone	Studio Khara	Hideaki Anno (chief); Masayuki; Kazuya Tsurumaki	101	Wevu~Angeriwon shin gekijō-ban: Jo	
September 15	Clannad Movie	Toei Animation	Osamu Dezaki	93	Gekijō-ban kuranado	
September 22	Aquarion: Ippatsu Gyakuten-hen	Satelight	Shōji Kawamori	116	Gekijō-ban akuerion - ippatsu gyakuten hen -	
September 29	Sword of the Stranger	Bones	Masahiro Andō	103	Sutorendjia - mukō hadan -	
October 19	Appleseed Ex Machina	Digital Frontier	Shinji Aramaki	104	Ekusu makina	
October 27	Afro Samurai the Movie	Gonzo		116	Afuro samurai gekijō-ban	
November 10	Yes! Precure 5 Movie: Kagami no Kuni no Miracle Daibouken!	Toei Animation	Tatsuya Nagamine	70	Eiga iesu! Purikyua 5 kagami no kuni no mirakuru dai bōken!	
December 1	The Garden of Sinners: Overlooking View	ufotable	Ei Aoki	50	Gekijō-ban sora no ryōiki the Garden of sinners daiisshō `miwatasu keshiki'	
December 22	.hack//G.U. Trilogy	CyberConnect2	Hiroshi Matsuyama	93	.hack//G.U. Trilogy	
December 22	Bleach: The DiamondDust Rebellion	Pierrot	Noriyuki Abe	95	Gekijō-ban burīchi The DiamondDust reberion mōhitotsu no kōri wa maru	
December 22	Nezumi Monogatari - George to Gerald no Bōken	Madhouse	Masami Hata	52	Nezumi monogatari jōji to jerarudo no bōken	
December 29	The Garden of Sinners: A Study in Murder - Part 1	ufotable	Takuya Nonaka	60	Gekijō-ban sora no ryōiki the Garden of sinners dainishō `satsujin sōsa (zenpen)'	

=== Television series ===
A list of anime television series that debuted between January 1 and December 31, 2007.

First run start and end dates	Title	Episodes	Studio	Director	Alternate title	Ref
January 5 – March 23	Shattered Angels	12	TNK	Tetsuya Yanagisawa	Kyō shirō to eien (towa) no sora	
January 5 – June 29	Saint October	26	Studio Comet	Masafumi Satō	Seinto okutōbā	
January 6 – March 24	Koi suru Tenshi Angelique: Kagayaki no Ashita	12	Satelight	Susumu Kudo	Koisuru tenshi anjerīku ~ kagayaki no ashita ~	
January 6 – June 30	Major (Season 3)	26	Studio Hibari	Riki Fukushima	Mejā (dai 3 shirīzu)	
January 7 – April 1	Himawari!!	13	Arms	Shigenori Kageyama	Himawari~tsu!!	
January 7 – December 30	Les Misérables: Shōjo Cosette	52	Nippon Animation	Hiroaki Sakurai	Re mizeraburu: shōjo kozetto	
January 8 – March 26	Gakuen Utopia Manabi Straight!	12	Ufotable	Hayato (ep 6); Hazuki Mizumoto (ep 10); Hiroatsu Agata (ep 4); Kei Tsunematsu (ep 7); Makoto Hoshino (ep 8); Takahiro Miura (eps 3, 9); Takayuki Hirao (5 episodes); Takuro Takahashi (eps 1, 12)	Gakuen yuto Pia manabi sutorēto!	
January 8 – March 26	Master of Epic: The Animation Age	12	Gonzo; Palm Studio	Tetsuya Endō	Masutā Obu epikku: The Animation Age	
January 8 – March 26	Shuffle! Memories	12	Asread	Naoto Hosoda	Shaffuru! Memorīzu	
January 12 – March 30	Hidamari Sketch	12	Shaft	Akiyuki Shinbo (chief); Ryōki Kamitsubo	Hida mari suketchi	
January 12 – March 30	Venus Versus Virus	12	Studio Hibari	Shinichiro Kimura	Vuīnasu vuāsasu vuaiarasu	
January 12 – June 15	Nodame Cantabile	23	J.C.Staff	Ken'ichi Kasai	No dame kantābire	
January 14 – March 25	Getsumento Heiki Mina	11	Gonzo	Keiichiro Kawaguchi	Getsumen to heiki mīna	
January 19 – April 20	Tokyo Majin	14	AIC Spirits; BeSTACK	Shinji Ishihira	Tōkyō majin gakuen kenpūchō Tō	
January 19 – July 20	GR: Giant Robo	13	A.C.G.T	Masahiko Murata	GR - jaianto robo -	
February 4 – January 27, 2008	Yes! PreCure 5	49	Toei Animation	Toshiaki Komura	Iesu! Purikyua 5	
February 4 – September 1	Reideen	26	Production I.G	Mitsuru Hongo	Raidīn	
February 15 – May 3	Jūsō Kikō Dancouga Nova	12	Ashi Productions	Masami Ōbari	Kemono Sō-ki Osamu dankūga novua	
February 15 – March 23, 2017	Naruto: Shippuden	500	Pierrot	Yasuaki Kurotsu	Naruto - shippuden	
February 22 – May 18	Rocket Girls	12	Mook Animation	Hiroshi Aoyama	Roketto gāru	
February 26 – May 14	Ikki Tousen: Dragon Destiny	12	Arms	Koichi Ohata	Ikkitōsen Dragon desutinī	
March 4 – May 27	Moonlight Mile	12	Studio Hibari	Iku Suzuki	Mūnraito mairu 1st shīzun - rifuto off -	
March 28 – June 13	Hitohira	12	Xebec M2	Akira Nishimori	Hitohira	
April 1 – September 30	Gurren Lagann	27	Gainax	Hiroyuki Imaishi	Tengan toppa guren ragan	
April 1 – March 24, 2008	Onegai My Melody Sukkiri♪	52	Studio Comet	Makoto Moriwaki	Onegai maimerodi sukkiri ♪	
April 1 – March 30, 2008	Hayate the Combat Butler	52	SynergySP	Keiichiro Kawaguchi	Hayate no gotoku!	
April 1 – March 29, 2009	GeGeGe no Kitarō	100	Toei Animation	Yukio Kaizawa	Gegege no kitarō (2007)	
April 2 – September 24	Magical Girl Lyrical Nanoha Strikers	26	Seven Arcs	Keizō Kusakawa	Mahō shōjo ririkaru nanoha sutoraikāzu	
April 2 – October 1	Heroic Age	26	Xebec	Takashi Noto (chief); Toshimasa Suzuki	Hiroikku eiji	
April 2 – October 1	My Bride is a Mermaid	26	Gonzo; AIC	Seiji Kishi	Seto no hanayome	
April 3 – September 25	El Cazador de la Bruja	26	Bee Train	Kōichi Mashimo	Eru Kazado	
April 3 – September 25	Idolmaster: Xenoglossia	26	Sunrise	Tatsuyuki Nagai	Aidorumasutā zenogurashia	
April 3 – September 25	Sugarbunnies	26	Asahi Production	Hiroshi Kugimiya		
April 3 – September 25	Toka Gettan: The Moonlight Lady Returns	26	Studio Deen	Yūji Yamaguchi	Tōka gettan	
April 4 – June 20	Shinkyoku Sōkai Polyphonica	12	Ginga-ya	Junichi Watanabe (chief); Masami Shimoda	Shinkyoku sōkai porifonika	
April 4 – June 27	Kono Aozora ni Yakusoku o	13	Artland	Ken Ando (chief); Tsutomu Yabuki	Kono aozora ni yakusoku wo — ~ yōkoso tsugumi ryō e ~	
April 4 – June 27	Saint Beast: Kouin Jojishi Tenshi Tan	13	Tokyo Kids; Yuhodo	Nanako Shimazaki	Seinto bīsuto ~ kōin jojishi tenshi Tan ~	
April 4 – June 27	Sisters of Wellber	13	Trans Arts	Takayuki Hamana	Uerubēru no monogatari shisutāzu of Wellber	
April 4 – September 26	Engage Planet Kiss Dum	26	Satelight	Yasuchika Nagaoka (chief); Eiichi Satō	Kisudamu - ENGAGE planet -	
April 4 – September 26	Oh! Edo Rocket	26	Madhouse	Seiji Mizushima	Ōedo roketto	
April 4 – September 26	Over Drive	26	Xebec	Takao Kato	Ōbā doraivu	
April 4 – September 26	Claymore	26	Madhouse	Hiroyuki Tanaka	Kureimoa	
April 5 – July 12	Kotetsushin Jeeg	13	Actas	Jun Kawagoe	Kōtetsu-shin jīgu	
April 5 – September 26	Romeo × Juliet	24	Gonzo	Fumitoshi Oizaki	Romio × Jurietto	
April 5 – September 27	Kishin Taisen Gigantic Formula	26	Brain's Base	Keiji Gotoh	Hatagami taisen gigantikku fōmyura	
April 5 – September 27	Nagasarete Airantō	26	Feel	Hideki Okamoto	Nagasarete airantō	
April 5 – March 27, 2008	Bakugan Battle Brawlers	52	TMS Entertainment	Mitsuo Hashimoto	Bakugan batoru burōrāzu	
April 6 – September 28	Darker than Black	25	Bones	Tensai Okamura	Darker zan burakku - kuro no keiyakusha -	
April 6 – September 28	Kamichama Karin	26	Satelight	Takashi Anno	Kamichama karin	
April 6 – September 28	Kōtetsu Sangokushi	25	Picture Magic	Tetsuya Endo (chief); Satoshi Saga	Kōtetsu sangokushi	
April 7 – June 30	Shining Tears X Wind	13	Studio Deen	Hiroshi Watanabe	Shainingu tiāzu kurosu u~indo	
April 7 – June 30	Sola	13	Nomad	Tomoki Kobayashi	sola	
April 7 – September 22	Toward the Terra	24	Minami machi Bugyōsho; Tokyo Kids	Osamu Yamazaki	Chikyū e...	
April 7 – September 29	Kaze no Shoujo Emily	26	TMS Entertainment	Harume Kosaka	Kaze no shōjo emirī	
April 7 – September 29	Love Com	24	Toei Animation	Kōnosuke Uda	Rabu ★ kon	
April 7 – September 29	Moribito: Guardian of the Spirit	26	Production I.G	Kenji Kamiyama	Seirei no moribito	
April 7 – March 8, 2008	The Story of Saiunkoku (season 2)	39	Madhouse	Jun Shishido	Saiunkoku monogatari dai 2 shirīzu	
April 7 – March 29, 2008	Blue Dragon	51	Studio Pierrot	Yukihiro Matsushita	Burū doragon	
April 8 – September 17	Lucky Star	24	Kyoto Animation	Yutaka Yamamoto (op; ed; eps 1-4); Yasuhiro Takemoto (eps 5-24)	Raki suta	
April 9 – September 25	Bokurano	24	Gonzo	Hiroyuki Morita	Boku-ra no	
April 13 – September 21	Kaze no Stigma	24	Gonzo	Junichi Sakata	Kaze no sutiguma	
April 13 – September 28	Big Windup!	25	A-1 Pictures	Tsutomu Mizushima	Ōkiku furikabutte	
April 13 – September 28	Princess Resurrection	25	Madhouse	Masayuki Sakoi	Kaibutsu ōjo	
April 14 – October 13	Spider Riders	26	Bee Train	Kōichi Mashimo	Supaidā raidāzu ~ yomigaeru taiyō ~	
April 17 – July 3	Eikoku Koi Monogatari Emma: Molders-hen	12	Ajia-do Animation Works	Tsuneo Kobayashi	Eikoku koi monogatari ema ~ merudāsu-hen ~	
April 29 – July 22	Skull Man	13	Bones	Takeshi Mori	Sukaru man	
April 29 – January 20, 2008	Tai Chi Chasers	39	JM Animation; Toei Animation	Hiroki Shibata	Taikyokuken senjimon	
May 3 – May 4	Afro Samurai	5	Gonzo	Fuminori Kizaki; Takeshi Koike (Pilot)	Afuro samurai	
May 12 – December 1	Dennō Coil	26	Madhouse	Mitsuo Iso	Dendō koiru	
June 14 – September 6	Devil May Cry: The Animated Series	12	Madhouse	Shin Itagaki	Debiru mei Kurai	
June 15 – September 13, 2008	Wangan Midnight	26	A.C.G.T	Tsuneo Tominaga	Wangan middonaito	
June 24 – September 23	Tetsuko no Tabi	13	Group TAC	Akinori Nagaoka	Tetsuko no tabi	
July 3 – September 18	Nanatsuiro Drops	12	Diomedéa	Takashi Yamamoto	Nanatsuiro doroppusu	
July 4 – September 12	Zombie-Loan	11	Xebec M2	Akira Nishimori	Zonbi rōn	
July 4 – September 19	Code-E	12	Studio Deen	Toshiyuki Katō	CODE-E	
July 4 – September 19	Dōjin Work	12	Remic	Kenichi Yatagai	Dōjin wāku	
July 4 – September 26	Buzzer Beater (season 2)	13	TMS Entertainment	Shigeyuki Miya	Buzā bītā dai 2-ki	
July 4 – September 26	Kenkō Zenrakei Suieibu Umishō	13	Artland	Kōichirō Sōtome	Kenkō zenra-kei suiei-bu umishō	
July 4 – September 27	School Days	12	TNK	Keitaro Motonaga	Sukūru deizu	
July 6 – September 28	Happy Happy Clover	13	Group TAC	Kazumi Nonaka	Wa pihapi kurōbā	
July 6 – October 5	Mushi-Uta	12	Beat Frog	Kazuo Sakai	Mushi uta	
July 6 – December 18	Higurashi When They Cry: Kai	24	Studio Deen	Chiaki Kon	Higurashi no naku koro ni: kai	
July 6 – December 28	Sky Girls	26	J.C.Staff	Yoshiaki Iwasaki	Sukai gāruzu	
July 7 – September 22	Potemayo	12	J.C.Staff	Takashi Ikehata	Pote ma yo	
July 8 – September 23	Sayonara, Zetsubou-Sensei	12	Shaft	Akiyuki Shinbo	Sayonara zetsubō-sensei	
July 9 – September 24	Moetan	13	Actas	Keiichiro Kawaguchi	Moetan	
July 9 – September 24	The Familiar of Zero: Knight of the Twin Moons	12	J.C.Staff	Yū Kō	Zero no tsukaima ~ futatsuki no kishi ~	
July 13 – September 28	Mononoke	12	Toei Animation	Kenji Nakamura	Mononoke	
July 19 – October 11	Shigurui	12	Madhouse	Hiroshi Hamasaki	Shigurui	
July 27 – October 12	Tokyo Majin (season 2)	12	AIC Spirits; BeSTACK	Shinji Ishihira	Tokyo Majin Gakuen Kenpuuchou: Tou Dai Ni Maku	
July 27 – November 2	Baccano!	13	Brain's Base	Takahiro Omori	Bakkāno!	
September 13 – December 13	Moonlight Mile (season 2)	14	Studio Hibari	Iku Suzuki	Mūnraito mairu 2 nd shīzun - Touch down -	
October 2 – December 25	Da Capo II	13	Feel	Hideki Okamoto	D. C. II ~ da kāpo II ~	
October 2 – December 25	Sketchbook: Full Color's	13	Hal Film Maker	Yoshimasa Hiraike	Suketchi bukku ~ full karā' s ~	
October 2 – April 1, 2008	Bamboo Blade	26	AIC ASTA	Hisashi Saito	Banbū burēdo	
October 3 – December 26	Blue Drop: Tenshitachi no Gikyoku	13	Asahi Production; BeSTACK	Masahiko Ohkura	Burū doroppu ~ tenshi-tachi no gikyoku ~	
October 3 – December 26	Myself ; Yourself	13	Doga Kobo	Yasuhiro Kuroda	Mai serufu; yuaserufu	
October 3 – December 26	Night Wizard!	13	Hal Film Maker	Yuusuke Yamamoto	Naitou~izādo	
October 3 – March 16, 2008	Mokke	24	Madhouse; Tezuka Productions	Masayoshi Nishida	Mokke	
October 3 – March 26, 2008	Fantastic Detective Labyrinth	25	Studio Deen	Hiroshi Watanabe	Suteki tantei ☆ rabirinsu	
October 3 – March 26, 2008	Neuro: Supernatural Detective	25	Madhouse	Hiroshi Kōjina	Majin tantei nōgami neuro	
October 3 – April 2, 2008	Kaiji: Ultimate Survivor	26	Madhouse	Yūzō Satō	Gyakkyō burai kaiji urutimeito Survivor	
October 4 – March 27, 2008	Dragonaut: The Resonance	25	Gonzo	Manabu Ono	Doragonōtsu - za resonansu -	
October 5 – December 21	Good Luck! Ninomiya-kun	12	AIC Spirits	Koji Yoshikawa	Goshūshō-sama ninomiya-kun	
October 5 – March 28, 2008	Clannad	23	Kyoto Animation	Tatsuya Ishihara	CLANNAD	
October 5 – March 28, 2008	Shakugan no Shana Second	24	J.C.Staff	Takashi Watanabe	Shakugan no shana II – Second –	
October 5 – March 28, 2008	You're Under Arrest: Full Throttle	23	Studio Deen	Koichi Ohata	Taiho shichau zo Furusu rottoru	
October 6 – March 22, 2008	Duel Masters Zero	24	Shogakukan Music & Digital Entertainment	Waruo Suzuki	Deyueru masutāzu zero	
October 6 – March 29, 2008	Mobile Suit Gundam 00	25	Sunrise	Seiji Mizushima	Kidō senshi Gandamu 00	
October 6 – September 27, 2008	Shugo Chara!	51	Satelight	Kenji Yasuda	Shugo kyara!	
October 7 – December 23	Ef: A Tale of Memories	12	Shaft	Shin Ōnuma	ef - a tale of memories.	
October 7 – March 23, 2008	KimiKiss: Pure Rouge	24	J.C.Staff	Ken'ichi Kasai	Kimikisu pure rouge	
October 7 – March 30, 2008	MapleStory	25	Madhouse	Takaaki Ishiyama	Meipuru sutōrī	
October 7 – September 28, 2008	Pururun! Shizuku-chan Aha	51	TMS Entertainment	Atsushi Yano	Pururuntsu! Shizuku-chan a hatsu☆	
October 7 – October 5, 2008	Hatara Kizzu Maihamu Gumi	50	Toei Animation	Tetsuo Imazawa	Hatarakizzu maihamu gumi	
October 8 – December 24	Prism Ark	12	Frontline	Masami Ōbari	Purizumu āku	
October 8 – December 31	Minami-ke	13	Daume	Masahiko Ohta	Minami ke	
October 8 – March 24, 2008	Rental Magica	24	Zexcs	Itsuro Kawasaki	Rentaru magika	
October 8 – March 31, 2008	Hero Tales	26	Studio Flag	Osamu Sekita	Jūshin'enbu - hīrō TALES -	
October 10 – December 26	Genshiken 2	12	Arms	Kinji Yoshimoto	Genshiken 2	
October 12 – December 21	Moyasimon: Tales of Agriculture	11	Shirogumi; Telecom Animation Film	Yūichirō Yano	Moyashi mon	
October 12 – December 28	Kodomo no Jikan	12	Diomedéa	Eiji Suganuma	Kodomo no jikan	
October 14 – March 23, 2008	Shion no Ō	22	Studio Deen	Toshifumi Kawase	Shion' no ō - The Flowers of Hard Blood	
October 18 – April 4, 2008	Ghost Hound	22	Production I.G	Ryūtarō Nakamura	Shinryōgari	
November 3 – March 29, 2008	Shooting Star Rockman Tribe	21	Xebec	Takao Kato	Ryūsei no rokkuman toraibu	
December 12 – February 27, 2008	Ayakashi	12	Tokyo Kids	Jun Takada	Ayakashi	

=== Original video animations ===
A list of original video animations that debuted between January 1 and December 31, 2007.

First run start and end dates	Title	Episodes	Studio	Director	Alternate title	Ref
January 1	Strike Witches	1	Gonzo	Kunihisa Sugishima	Sutoraikuu~itchīzu	
January 18	.hack//G.U. Returner	1	Bee Train	Kōichi Mashimo	.HACK//G.U. RETURNER	
January 25	Happiness!: Watarase Jun no Kareinaru Ichinichi	1	Artland		Wa pinesu! Watarase jun no kareinaru tsuitachi	
January 30	Eko Eko Azarak	1	Toei Animation	Choukou Toshikazu	Eko eko azaraku	
January 30	Tori no Uta	1	Toei Animation	Yoshitaka Amano	Tori no uta	
February 23	Hokuto no Ken: Yuria-den	1	TMS Entertainment	Hidehito Ueda	Ma kyūseishu densetsu hokuto no kobushi Yuria Den	
February 23 – April 25	Ichigo Mashimaro OVA	3	Daume	Takuya Satō	Ichigo mashimaro ovu~a	
February 28 – September 28	To Heart 2 OVA	3	Chaos Project	Yasuhisa Katō	To~uhāto 2 ovua	
March 13	Detective Conan: A Challenge from Agasa! Agasa vs. Conan and the Detective Boys	1	TMS Entertainment	Yasuichiro Yamamoto	Meitantei konan Kuma kasa kara no chōsen-jō! Kuma Ryū vs Konan & shōnen tantei-dan	
March 23	Bakuretsu Tenshi: Infinity	1	Gonzo	Kōichi Ōhata	Ekusupurōdingu enjeru - Infinity -	
March 28	Lovedol: Lovely Idol OVA	1	AIC ASTA; TNK		Rabudoru onsen desu ka?	
March 28 – August 29	Murder Princess	6	Bee Train	Tomoyuki Kurokawa	Mādā purinsesu	
April 4 – August 1	Sakura Taisen: New York	6	AIC	Ryuichi Kimura	Sakura taisen nyūyōku nyūyōku	
April 25 – October 26	Aika R-16: Virgin Mission	3	Studio Fantasia	Katsuhiko Nishijima	AIKa R-16:VIRGIN MISSION	
April 27 – December 28	Saiyuuki Reload: Burial	3	Arms; Pierrot	Kōichi Ōhata	Saiyūki RELOAD - burial -	
May 25	Kiddy GiRL-AND Pilot	1	asread.	Keiji Gotou	Kidi gārando	
May 25 – September 25	Ice	3	PPM	Makoto Kobayashi	Aisu - aisu -	
May 25 – November 22	Sousei no Aquarion OVA	2	Satelight	Shōji Kawamori	Ovu~a "sōsei no akuerion"	
May 30	Initial D Battle Stage 2	1	A.C.G.T.	Fumitsugu Yamaguchi	inisharu D BATTLE sutēji 2	
June 8 – December 21	Tales of Symphonia The Animation: Sylvarant-hen	4	ufotable	Haruo Sotozaki	Teiruzu obu shinfonia THE animēshon shiruvu~aranto-hen	
June 22 – January 25, 2008	Tennis no Oujisama: Zenkoku Taikai-hen - Semifinal	6	M.S.C		Tenisu no ōjisama zenkoku taikai-hen Semifinal	
June 29	Sekishoku Elegy	1	Toei Animation	Seiichi Hayashi	Akairo erejī	
July 4	Iblard Jikan	1	Studio Ghibli	Naohisa Inoue	Ibarādo jikan	
August 8	Flag Director's Edition: Issenman no Kufura no Kiroku	1	The Answer Studio	Kou Matsuo	Reddo gāden: deddo gāruzu	
August 8	Red Garden: Dead Girls	1	Gonzo		Furaggu direkutā' s edishon ichi sen man no kufura no kiroku	
August 11 – November 10	Bludgeoning Angel Dokuro-chan 2	2	HAL Film Maker	Tsutomu Mizushima	Bokusatsu tenshido kuro-chan 2 [sekando]	
September 7	Blame! Prologue	2	Production I.G	Shigeyuki Watanabe	BLAME! (2007)	
September 11 – January 21, 2011	Kodomo no Jikan OVA	3	Diomedéa		Kodomo no jikan ovu~a	
September 21	Aria the OVA: Arietta	1	HAL Film Maker	Junichi Satō	Aria The ovu~a ~ ARIETTA ~	
October 15 – March 10, 2008	Indian Summer	3	Daume	Takayuki Inagaki	Koharu biyori	
October 24	Nasu: A Migratory Bird with Suitcase	1	Madhouse	Kitarō Kōsaka	Nasu sūtsukēsu no wataridori	
October 25	Gurren Lagann: My Gurren is Shiny!!	1	Gainax	Hiroyuki Imaishi	Tengantoppa gurenragan ore no Guren wa pikkapika!!	
October 26 – March 28, 2008	Kyou kara Maou! R	5	Studio Deen	Junji Nishimura	Kyō kara maō! R	
October 26 – August 25, 2008	Soukou Kihei Votoms: Pailsen Files	12	The Answer Studio	Ryousuke Takahashi	Sōkō kihei botomuzu pēruzen fairuzu	
November 16 – March 17, 2008	Tsubasa Tokyo Revelations	3	Production I.G	Shunsuke Tada	Tsubasa tōkyō REVELATIONS	
November 19 – January 21, 2008	Blow the Flute Jaguar!	3	Kaeruotoko Shokai	Frogman	Pyū to fuku! Jagā	
November 22	Tweeny Witches the Adventures	6	Studio 4°C	Yoshiharu Ashino	Mahō shōjo taiarusu the Adventure	
November 26 – April 28, 2008	Strait Jacket	3	feel.	Shinji Ushiro	Sutoreito jaketto	
December 5	Tokyo Marble Chocolate	2	Production I.G	Naoyoshi Shiotani	Tōkyō māburu chokorēto	
December 21 – December 19, 2008	Rumbling Hearts OVA	4	Brain's Base	Hideki Takayama	Kimi ga nozomu eien ~ Next sezon ~	
December 26 – March 26, 2008	Yawaraka Sangokushi Tsukisase!! Ryofuko-chan	4	Chaos Project	Yūji Moriyama	Yawaraka Sangokushi tsukisase!! Robukochan	

== See also ==
- 2007 in animation
