= Chop Kick Panda =

2011 animated film

- The 2011 movie poster of Chop Kick Panda
- Directed by: Darrell Van Citters
- Written by: Robert Zappia
- Production company: Renegade Animation
- Distributed by: Gaiam
- Release date: May 10, 2011
- Running time: 41 minutes

Chop Kick Panda is a 2011 American 2D animated film written by Robert Zappia. It was produced by Renegade Animation and was released in the United States on May 10, 2011, by Gaiam. It has a running time of 41 minutes. The movie is considered a mockbuster of DreamWorks's Kung Fu Panda and received mostly negative reviews from critics.

== Premise ==
Zibo is a lazy panda who dreams of being a master of martial arts. He knows that an evil tiger has plans to take over the kingdom, so he must stop him.

There is a large lovable panda named Lu, who is the sixth generation owner of the Tae Kwon Do dojo. Lu does not know that buried beneath the dojo is the ancient Amulet of Fury. The mythical amulet gives its owner ultimate power and protection.

== Cast ==
- Phil Lollar as Bali and Grand Master
- Alicyn Packard as Rex and Shiva
- Michael Van Citters as Ming
- Rick Zieff as Lu (Zibo) and Slade

== Reception ==
The movie was panned for being a poor "mockbuster" version of DreamsWorks's Kung Fu Panda, and in particular a knock-off of Kung Fu Panda 2. The film has been called a "shameless" "straight-up rip-off". Although agreeing on that point, another commentator found the 2D animation "pretty decent".

== See also ==
- The Little Panda Fighter, another mockbuster of Kung Fu Panda
