= Little from the Fish Shop =

- Theatrical release poster
- Directed by: Jan Balej
- Screenplay by: Jan Balej
- Based on: "The Little Mermaid" by Hans Christian Andersen
- Produced by: Nelly Jenčíková; Viktor Mayer
- Starring: Oldřich Kaiser
- Cinematography: Alan Soural
- Edited by: Patrik Pass
- Music by: Vincent Favrat; Chapelier Fou; Yann Tiersen
- Production companies: Miracle Film; Hafan Film
- Release date: 28 May 2015
- Running time: 75 minutes
- Country: Czech Republic
- Language: Czech
- Budget: € 1.5 million

Little from the Fish Shop (Czech: Malá z rybárny) is a Czech stop motion animated film written and directed by Jan Balej. Narrated by Oldřich Kaiser, the film is loosely based on Danish writer Hans Christian Andersen's fairy tale The Little Mermaid.

== Summary ==
Water pollution forces the royal merfamily-the Sea King, his mother, his pet fish Precious, and his three daughters: Princesses Big, Middle, and Little-to leave their underwater realm and move onto land. The family of six settle in a port, the Sea King setting up a fish shop where he and his family sell daily catches. Two of the regular customers are a waiter who works in the restaurant across the street, and Bodan, a high-ranking Mafia gangster and the object of Little's desires.

Every night, Big and Middle deliver fresh fish to nearby pubs and restaurants; because she isn't 16 years old yet, Little isn't allowed to venture outside her family's shop and home. Little's 16th birthday arrives, and her family celebrates by giving her a new necklace and letting her explore the streets for the first time; now that she has come of age, Little joins her older sisters in delivering fish to their customers. On her first night working, Little finds Boden beaten up and uses her cart to bring him to the entrance of his nightclub. Now deeply in love with Boden, Little asks her grandmother how they can be together and the old mermaid replies that Little must have legs and earn the man's love; to accomplish such a feat, a witch who lives in the sewers could help.

After she and her family celebrate the annual feast of the Green Lanterns, Little enters the sewers and meets the witch. In exchange for a potion that will turn Little's tail into legs, the witch takes the mermaid's necklace, hair, and voice; the witch warns Little that she should she fail to earn Boden's love and he marries another, the mermaid will die and turn to sea foam the morning after the wedding.

Now a mute girl with legs, Little leaves her family and begins working for Boden. Although the two become close, Boden doesn't return Little's affections nor is he aware she had saved his life. When Middle learns of Little's deal and new life, she persuades her to come home, but the young mermaid refuses as she is determined to win Boden's heart. Sadly for Little, Boden marries a blond woman he has been dating for some time, the reception held at his nightclub.

When they learn of Boden's wedding, Little's family rush to the witch who gives her sisters a magical dagger in exchange for their long hair. When the wedding party has gone to bed, Little's sisters give her the dagger, instructing her to use it to stab Boden in the heart before sunrise so she could become a mermaid again. However, Little couldn't bring herself to kill the man she still loves. Dropping the dagger, Little walks into streets and dies when the sun rises.

Sea water bursts out of the manholes, flooding the streets and carrying Little's body to the ocean where it dissolves into foam.

Despite Little's life being cut short, the narrator tells the audience that she had still managed to experience wonderful things, and ends the film by persuading the audience to chase their own dreams.

== Production ==
The film was produced through Miracle Film with co-production support from companies in Slovakia and France. It received eight million Czech crowns from the Czech State Cinematographic Fund, 90,000 euro from the Slovak Audiovisual Fund and 250,000 euro from Eurimages. The full budget corresponded to 1.5 million euro. Principal photography took 410 days. The film was released in 2015.

== See also ==
- 2015 in film
- Cinema of the Czech Republic
