= The Three Fools =

- The Three Fools and the Tree (1977)
- Тримата глупаци
- Created by: Donyo Donev
- Directed by: Donyo Donev
- Country of origin: Bulgaria
- No. of episodes: 11 (list of episodes)

Production
- Running time: 7.30 minutes approx.

Original release
- Release: February 13, 1970 – June 10, 1990

The Three Fools (Bulgarian: Тримата глупаци / Trimata glupatsi) is a series of 11 short animated satiric films created and directed by the Bulgarian cartoonist Donyo Donev. The first episode was released in 1970 and the last one in 1990. The screenplays are written by Donyo Donev, Anastas Pavlov, Georgi Chavdarov, Dimo Bolyarov and Georgi Dumanov.

The series uses the typical for Donev simplified lines, deformed speech and interjections as well as drum and bagpipe sounds.

Ever since the first episode's release, the films obtained wide popularity and critical acclaim. Each episode alone won at least one international award.

In 1982, the satirical paper The Three Fools, named after the characters of the series, was founded with Donyo Donev as editor-in-chief.

== Episodes ==
Year	Episode			Running time	Screenplay
Year	English title	Bulgarian title	Transliteration	Running time	Screenplay
June 27, 1970	The Three Fools	Тримата глупаци	Trimata glupatsi	8.46 min	Anastas Pavlov
May 13, 1972	The Three Fools as Hunters	Тримата глупаци – ловци	Trimata glupatsi – lovtsi	6.12 min	Anastas Pavlov
January 25, 1973	The Three Fools and the Automobile	Тримата глупаци и автомобилът	Trimata glupatsi i avtomobilat	7.12 min	Anastas Pavlov
September 9, 1974	The Three Fools and the Cow	Тримата глупаци и кравата	Trimata glupatsi i kravata	6.30 min	Anastas Pavlov
March 14, 1977	The Three Fools and the Tree	Тримата глупаци и дървото	Trimata glupatsi i darvoto	8.20 min	Donyo Donev
May 13, 1978	The Three Fools and the Fool Woman	Тримата глупаци и глупачката	Trimata glupatsi i glupachkata	9.08 min	Georgi Chavdarov
September 9, 1979	The Three Fools as Athletes	Тримата глупаци – атлети	Trimata glupatsi – atleti	5.30 min	Donyo Donev; Dimo Bolyarov
June 25, 1980	The Three Fools as Pedagogues	Тримата глупаци – педагози	Trimata glupatsi – pedagozi	9.22 min	Donyo Donev; Dimo Bolyarov
February 23, 1982	The Three Fools as Fishermen	Тримата глупаци – рибари	Trimata glupatsi – ribari	8.36 min	Donyo Donev; Georgi Dumanov
September 27, 1989	The Three Fools in the Restaurant	Тримата глупаци в ресторанта	Trimata glupatsi v restoranta	6.04 min	Donyo Donev
June 10, 1990	The Three Fools Non-stop	Тримата глупаци нон стоп	Trimata glupatzi non-stop	2.45 Min	Donyo Donev
