= The Little Panda Fighter =

- Cover art of The Little Panda Fighter
- Brazilian Portuguese: Ursinho da Pesada
- Directed by: Michelle Gabriel
- Written by: Ale McHaddo
- Produced by: Mauricio Milani
- Starring: Raul Schlosser; Sidney Ross; Aiden Wellby
- Edited by: Paulo Rebouças
- Music by: Renato Lemos
- Production company: Vídeo Brinquedo
- Distributed by: Morningstar Entertainment (North America)
- Release date: November 18, 2008
- Running time: 51 minutes
- Country: Brazil
- Languages: English; Portuguese

The Little Panda Fighter (Portuguese: Ursinho da Pesada; lit. Heavy Little Bear) is a 2008 Brazilian animated sports action comedy film directed by Michelle Gabriel. The film has drawn criticism as a mockbuster of the DreamWorks Animation film Kung Fu Panda. The film also received heavy criticism for its animation and plot. The English dub of the film features the voices of Dan Green, David Brimmer, Erica Schroeder, Mike Pollock and Maddie Blaustein.

== Plot ==
In a small town inhabited by anthropomorphic bears, a giant panda named Pancada works as a janitor at a boxing karate club called Bear Bar Box. He has dreams of one day becoming a professional dancer, despite everyone's indifference, and is in love with a brown bear waitress named Honey. His boss, a polar bear named Polaris, finds that his club is losing money, mostly due to his top boxer, Freak Teddy, winning every match he fights in. Despite wanting to go in and defeat Teddy himself, the property's manager, Grizzlepuss, informs Polaris that he is under contract not to.

Later that night, Pancada visits his dancing instructor, a small brown bear named Master Jin, who teaches him about loyalty. The next day, Polaris has found his old fighting costume—a two-piece black top, bottom and face mask—and tells Pancada to wash it for him. After Polaris tells Pancada his plan to secretly fight Freak Teddy in disguise, the latter leaves, attempting to keep a cool demeanor. In the basement washroom, Pancada becomes distracted by the rhythm of the washer, resulting in the costume shrinking in the wash.

The day of the fight, a disguised Polaris is put in the ring with Freak Teddy, while Pancada goes to a dance competition. At the fight, the costume Polaris is wearing shrinks on him, causing him to look like a panda. This leads everyone to mistake Polaris as Pancada. Polaris wins the fight, while Pancada wins the dance competition under harsh criticism.

The following day afterward, Pancada is approached by his crush, Honey. Impressed by his "win", Honey kisses Pancada on the cheek. Pancada erroneously believes that he is being congratulated for his dancing skills. However, a newspaper later arrives at the club, showing Pancada that he was mistaken for Polaris. After some words of wisdom from Master Jin, he approaches Polaris in his office, wanting to rematch Freak Teddy to be more rightfully praised. While Pancada undergoes brief training, his fight against Freak Teddy goes badly, and Pancada gives up on boxing.

After the fight, Pancada becomes a laughingstock again, and arrives to Polaris' office to inform him of the loss. However, Polaris informs Pancada that he had made a bet that the latter would lose the fight, thus becoming very wealthy. Before Polaris leaves, he transfers ownership of the club to Pancada. Grizzlepuss finally confronts Pancada about the scheme, though Pancada simply denies this.

After Polaris retires to the icy mountains, Pancada transforms the boxing club into a dance club.

== Cast ==
Character name	Brazilian voice actor	English voice actor
Pancada	Raul Schlosser	Dan Green
Polaris	Sidney Ross	David Brimmer
Honey / Beth	Claudia Victoria	Erica Schroeder
Freak Teddy / Teddy Thunders	Claudio Satrio	Dan Green
Master Xin	Charlie Mambertt	Mike Pollock
Grizzlepuss	Sidney Ross	Maddie Blaustein

== Production ==
The film was produced by animation studio Vídeo Brinquedo to coincide with the film Kung Fu Panda. The similarities that the film has with Kung Fu Panda have brought many to consider it a mockbuster, along with many of Vídeo Brinquedo's other films.

== Release and reception ==
The film was released on DVD on November 18, 2008 to negative reviews from critics, primarily because of its similarities to Kung Fu Panda, which was released only a few months before. A columnist for the website Nster News wrote that, in comparison to Kung Fu Panda, The Little Panda Fighter is "a trashy uninspired rip-off with a similar plot and lower budget". Mike Jeavons of Channel Awesome stated that "the animation is terrible, the dialogue physically hurts, and the story is contrived and barely feels complete enough to fill the 50-minute runtime. The music is bad, the whole thing lacks imagination, and the characters and their motivations are awful".

== See also ==
- Chop Kick Panda, another mockbuster of Kung Fu Panda
