= Donyo Donev =

Bulgarian caricaturist (1929–2007)

Donyo Donev Доньо Донев
- Born: 27 June 1929; Berkovitsa, Montana Province, Bulgaria
- Died: 28 November 2007 (aged 78); Sofia, Bulgaria
- Occupations: Director, cartoonist
- Years active: 1957–2007

Donyo Petrov Donev (Bulgarian: Доньо Петров Донев; 27 June 1929 – 28 November 2007) was a Bulgarian animator, director, art director, comics artist and cartoonist. He is best known as the "father of The Three Fools" – an animated humorous sequence whose short episodes were continuously released during the 1970s and 1980s. His biting satirical caricatures were published in most of the Bulgarian newspapers.

Donev's works are characterized with simplified lines, the plasticity of the motion, and vivid expressiveness. He was the first to use a deformed manner of speaking and interjections as a sound image of a second plan, accompanied with the sounds of drums and bagpipes.

== Biography and career ==
Donyo Donev was born on 27 June 1929 in Berkovitsa, a small town in the northwest part of Bulgaria. He enrolled at the National Academy of Art in Sofia, where he studied graphic art in 1949–1954 under the eminent Bulgarian artist Ilia Beshkov. After graduating in the academy he attended a postgraduate course in 1959 in the Moscow's Soyuzmultfilm.

He worked as an artist with the Bulgarian paper "Evening News" (1954–1956). During the period 1956–1970 Donev was an animator and director in the department of animation in the Studio of Featured Films (SFF), Sofia. Since 1970 he was a head of a film unit in the Studio of Animated Films (SAF), Sofia where he stayed until 1993. In 1970 was released the first short episode of The Three Fools. This animated caricature became popular throughout the country. Subsequently, it were released nine more episodes in the 1970s and 1980s. The sequence turned into a badge of Donev' creative works. There are not a single episode of them that was not awarded at the foreign film festivals. Some of his other notable works are Happy End (1969), Clever Village (1972), De Facto (1973) and Causa Perduta (1977). There are also numerous awards he received for his other animated films through the years.

In the 1990s Donev was an editor-in-chief of the satirical paper named after his famous animated characters The Three Fools. He was also an editor in "Fras" (bang!) – a magazine for humour and fun. As a cartoonist he constantly took part in exhibitions in Bulgaria and abroad.

Donev has been a professor at the National Academy for Theatre and Film Arts for years, where he taught directing of animation. He was decorated with the high government prize the Order Of Saint Cyril And Saint Methodius.

Donyo Donev died in 2007 at the age of 78.

== Selected filmography ==
=== The three fools sequence ===
- 1970 – The Three Fools / Trimata glupatsi
- 1972 – Three Fools as Hunters / Trimata glupatsi – lovtsi
- 1974 – The Three Fools and the Cow / Trimata glupatsi i kravata
- 1977 – The Three Fools and the Tree / Trimata glupatsi i darvoto
- 1978 – The Three Fools and the Fool Woman / Trimata glupatsi i glupachkata
- 1979 – Three Fools as Athletes / Trimata glupatsi – atleti
- 1980 – Three Fools as Pedagogues / Trimata glupatsi – pedagozi
- 1982 – Three Fools as Fishermen / Trimata glupatsi – ribari
- 1989 – The Three Fools in the Restaurant / Trimata glupatsi v restoranta
- 1990 – Three Fools Non-stop / Trimata glupatzi non-stop

=== Other ===
- 1969 – Happy End / Hepi End
- 1972 – Clever Village / Umno selo
- 1973 – De Facto / De fakto
- 1977 – Causa Perduta / Kauza perduta
- 1985 – We Called Them Montagues and Capulets / Narekohme gi Monteki i Kapuleti
- 1988 – Wolf's Suite / Valcha syuita

== Some awards ==
- 1988 – Golden Mikeldi for Wolf's Suite – Bilbao International Festival of Documentary and Short Films
- 1989 – Silver Dragon for Wolf's Suite – Cracow Film Festival
