= Jan Balej =

Czech director (born 1958)

Jan Balej (born 30 May 1958 in Prague) is a Czech animation artist, film director and art designer. Balej graduated from the Academy of Arts, Architecture and Design in Prague (Studio of Film and Television Graphics) in 1992.

== Works ==
- 1992–1994 – Tom Thumb
- 1999–2000 – bedtime stories for Czech TV (notably The Doings of Hippopotamus Family)
- 2000 - Mire Bala Kale Hin: Tales from the Endless Road (with Katariina Lillqvist).
- 2000 – short film Džin
- 2003 – short film Shells
- 2006 – One Night in A City feature animated puppet film
- 2006 – Fimfarum 2 (the short: The Sea, Uncle, why is it salty?) – Fimfarum 2 was awarded the Czech Lion in that same year
- 2006 – Mr. Fin and Mr. Twig
- 2007 – The Head of a Studio of Animation and TV graphic of Academy of Arts, Architecture and Design in Prague
- 2008 – Karlik and Magic Fish – TV series with Czech Television
- 2009 - Little Rain Worms - TV series collaborated with artwork Jaromir Gal.
- 2015 – Little from the Fish Shop – feature animated film based on "The Little Mermaid" by Hans Christian Andersen
