= Minushi =

- Directed by: Tyler Gibb
- Written by: Tyler Gibb
- Produced by: Tyler Gibb
- Starring: Jay Donaldson; Tyler Gibb; Tara Lutchman; Vidya Lutchman; Marc Schultz; Andrew Rotheram
- Music by: Tyler Gibb; Marc Schultz
- Release date: July 10, 2007 (Canada)
- Running time: 94 minutes
- Country: Canada
- Language: English

Minushi is a Canadian animated feature film produced, directed, written and animated by Tyler Gibb, an independent filmmaker living in Montreal, Quebec. It is one of the first feature films to be entirely animated in Adobe Flash. It premiered on July 10 at the 2007 Fantasia Festival in Montreal.

An adapted version of the film has been released online in 19 chapters.

== Plot ==
The story is set in a future world where giant mechanical robots have landed on the Earth. They are being fought by the military (led by General Werner). Most of the common people, however, do not know where they came from or what they are.

Trixi Asha and Khal Kekoa are two orphans who decide to escape from an army-controlled city. Trixi wants to find her brother Griffin, who was conscripted into the army long ago. They narrowly manage to escape the city, pursued by both the army and a mysterious figure called Mr. Tinker with his "goonbots". After some hiking through the forest, they come to a highway, where they get a lift from a truck-driver named Dale to a town called Westlake (the last place from where Trixi received a letter from her brother). On the way, they are ambushed by bandits and lose Dale, and are forced to continue to Westlake alone.

Upon arriving, they find a decimated town with destroyed buildings and a populace which initially only wants them to leave. Eventually, they are given food and shelter but are betrayed at night by one of the townspeople to Mr. Tinker. Another of the townspeople helps them escape, and shows them to a secret entrance to a nearby army base (Trixi wants to search for records of where her brother may have gone). Trixi and Khal sneak into the base and find that the information on Griffin's whereabouts is encrypted. Meanwhile, Mr. Tinker approaches the army base to tell them that their security has been breached. Before Khal can crack the encryption, the alarm goes off. The two orphans grab the hard drive from the computer and manage to narrowly escape.

(to be continued)

== Cast ==
Name	Notes
Jay Donaldson	
Tyler Gibb	Performs voices for: Khal Kekoa, Mr. Tinker, Ezra, General Werner, others
Tara Lutchman	
Vidya Lutchman	Performs voices for: Trixi Asha, others
Marc Schultz	Plays guitar for soundtrack, performs various voices
Andrew Rotheram	Performs various voices

== History ==
Production on Minushi began in spring 2003; the script was written and the voices were recorded. The first online episode was released in 2004, and they continued to be released at roughly the rate of one a month until the middle of 2005, when production of new online episodes slowed down for various reasons. The first was that some of the artwork in the older episodes needed to be redone; as the series had progressed, the art style had noticeably changed, so Tyler Gibb decided to "retool" episodes 1-7 (the old versions were replaced on the official website and on Newgrounds). The second reason was that Tyler Gibb decided to spend more time on the theatrical/DVD version of Minushi, which would feature improved artwork, music and a somewhat different edit of the film.

A new website for the theatrical/DVD version of Minushi was launched on November 11, 2006. On January 9, 2007, the film was fully finished and the film's representative, Mr. Marc Wilder, began looking for distribution venues.

Gibb does not own a graphics tablet; he animated the entire film by drawing in pencil on 8x11 sheets of paper, scanning the drawings and redrawing them with the pencil tool in Flash. According to Gibb, "the pile of 1,700 sheets stands at 4 and a half inches tall, usually with two "shots" to a page".

== See also ==
- History of Canadian animation
- List of animated feature films
