= Monkey King vs. Er Lang Shen =

2007 Chinese computer-animated film

- Directed by: Liang Hansen
- Produced by: Liang Hansen; Zhou Meiling
- Release date: 2007
- Country: China
- Language: Mandarin
- Budget: US$ 1 million

Monkey King vs. Er Lang Shen (Chinese: 孙悟空大战二郎神) is a Puppet/CG Chinese animated film produced by Yuan Cheng. The story is based on an episode of the 16th-century novel Journey to the West.

== Background ==
The film features puppet live action, about 30% of the movie, with animated 3D backgrounds and characters.

== Story ==
Based on a few early chapters of classic fantasy novel Journey to the West, the story tells how Sun Wukong rises against the heaven and has a horrific fight with Erlang Shen, the nephew of Jade Emperor, who rules the Heaven.

== Reception ==
It was nominated for the Asia Pacific Screen Award for Best Animated Feature Film at the 1st Asia Pacific Screen Awards.
