= One Night in One City =

2007 film by Jan Balej

- Directed by: Jan Balej
- Written by: Jan Balej; Ivan Arsenjev
- Produced by: Viktor Mayer
- Cinematography: Miloslav Špála
- Edited by: Magda Sandersová
- Music by: Tadeáš Věrčák; Zbyněk Mader (sound)
- Production companies: HAFAN film MAUR film
- Release date: 25 January 2007
- Running time: 75 minutes
- Country: Czech Republic
- Language: none
- Budget: $700,000 US

One Night in One City, also known as One Night in a City and One Night in the City (Czech: Jedné noci v jednom městě) is a stop-motion-animated feature-length black comedy horror film from the Czech Republic. It was released theatrically in its home country on 25 January 2007 and features only incomprehensible mumblings instead of dialogue, much like the earlier animated feature Krysar.

The film was made with the help of the Czech government; it got a grant of Kc 1.875 million (~US$100,000) in 1998, the largest grant given to an animated production for that year. It was produced by MAUR Film, which was previously responsible for two award-winning Czech feature films (also puppet-animated), Fimfárum and Fimfárum 2. The film participated in the "Forum for European Animation Films" in March 2007.

The DVD of the film was released on 25 February 2008.

== See also ==
- Adult animation
- List of animated feature-length films
- List of stop-motion films
