= La Reine Soleil =

- film poster depicting Akhesa and Akhenaten
- Directed by: Philippe Leclerc
- Written by: Gilles Adrien, Laurent Burtin; Christian Jacq (novel)
- Starring: Coralie Vanderlinden, David Scarpuzza, Arnaud Léonard.
- Edited by: Nathalie Delvoye
- Music by: Didier Lockwood
- Distributed by: Rezo Films
- Release date: 24 April 2007
- Running time: 77 minutes
- Country: France
- Language: French

La Reine Soleil (The Sun Queen) is a French-animated feature film (French/Hungarian/Belgian co-production) made by Philippe Leclerc. It was released in France on 4 April 2007. The animation was created by the Hungarian company Cinemon studios and special effects were created by Greykid Pictures, which was also responsible for compositing and some of the animation. The story is based on the novel La Reine Soleil by Christian Jacq.

== Plot ==
In Ancient Egypt, during the monotheistic regime of Akhenaten, Akhesa is a beautiful princess, 14 years of age. An impetuous young girl, Akhesa rebels against her father's dictates. She refuses to live confined in the royal palace and wants to discover why her mother, Queen Nefertiti, has been exiled on the island of Elephantine. Assisted by her betrothed, prince Tutankhaten or "Tut", Akhesa flees the court in hopes of finding her mother. In defiance of danger, the two teenagers travel down the Nile to the burning-hot desert dunes, courageously facing the mercenary Zannanza and priests of Amun Ra, who are conspiring to overthrow the pharaoh because of his rejection of their god. With innocence their only weapon, Akhesa and Tut overcome many hardships, and encounter an extraordinary destiny.
