= The Three Robbers =

Children's book by Tomi Ungerer

The Three Robbers is a children's picture book written and illustrated by Tomi Ungerer and published in 1961. It has been adapted for animation twice: a 6-minute short directed by Gene Deitch, released in 1972 by Weston Woods Studios, and a feature-length film from 2007 directed by Hayo Freitag, which was translated to English and released as Trick or Treaters.

== Children's book (1961) ==
The Three Robbers
- Author: Tomi Ungerer
- Publisher: Atheneum Books
- Publication date: 1962
- Pages: 40
- ISBN: 0-689-20453-1

=== Plot ===
The titular robbers are fierce highwaymen who wear tall black hats and large black capes. They make a fortune by stopping carriages and robbing the passengers of their valuables. One night, the carriage the robbers waylay has only a single passenger, the orphan Tiffany, who was delighted to meet the robbers; as she has no possessions to steal, they take her to their cave hideout and leave her sleeping. The next morning, when she awakens, she finds their riches and asks what they plan to do with their wealth. Taken aback by her boldness, they purchase a castle and gather lost, unhappy, and abandoned children from across the land, dressing each in tall red caps and capes. As the orphans grow to adults, a village grows around the castle and to honor their foster fathers, the villagers erect three tall towers with high roofs resembling the robbers' hats.

=== Publication history ===
Ungerer's editor at Harper & Brothers, Ursula Nordstrom, who had published his first children's book in 1957, rejected The Three Robbers but did not give a reason why. It was picked up in 1961, published by Georg Lentz Verlag in German as Die drei Räuber, and currently is published by Phaidon Press, Diogenes Verlag, and L'ecole des loisirs. The first English edition was published in 1962 by Atheneum Books.

=== Reception ===
Horn Book named it to its best books of 1962. Arthur Hubschmid summarized the book as being "about the essential things of life", adding that it described "the profound harmony of men and women", with Tiffany's question being the spark that profoundly changes everyone's lives: "I think for Tomi the money is not what’s interesting for him, what’s interesting is what you're going to do with it. Men alone, it's like they just have no idea what to do with it. Money is there to build a civilisation." Writing for The New York Times when Phaidon republished the book in 2008, Robert Sullivan noted that Ungerer's works were "delightful and artistically nourishing" due to their absurd nature. Daniel Handler (Lemony Snicket) called The Three Robbers one of his favorite spooky children's books.

== Feature film (2007) ==
=== Plot ===
Triplet brothers wearing black caps and capes are very successful in their exploits as highwayman robbers: Dominik using his blunderbuss to intimidate coachmen and passengers, Felix using his pepper-blower to disorientate and blind carriage horses, while Maximus vandalizes carriage wheels with his red battle axe. But, one day the robbers intercept a carriage, only to find a lonely girl named Tiffany whose parents died and is being sent to live with a wicked aunt who runs an orphanage. Not wanting to go to the orphanage, Tiffany tricks the robbers into believing she was the daughter of a maharaja, and is carried off to their hideout. While Tiffany makes the robbers question what they intend to do with their amassed wealth, she helps them learn to read and write when they want to send a ransom letter. The robbers eventually learn Tiffany lied to them when they found her missing child poster. Tiffany is remorseful and leaves in shame to head to the orphanage.

Along the way to the orphanage, Tiffany encounters two runaway orphans named Nikolas and Gregory. From them she learns that Auntie places the children in mandatory child labor to harvest sugar beets, and then extracting the sugar by using her pastry-making machine in order to make her desserts. After secretly entering the orphanage while the runways are captured, Tiffany exposes Auntie's pastry hoard to the other orphans, and a brawl happens between the kids and their wicked caretaker. Auntie is just about to punish Tiffany when the robbers arrive, revealed to be runaway orphans themselves as they make amends with Tiffany. Auntie refuses to hand Tiffany over to the robbers before falling into her pastry-making vat in a fit of insanity, and she is eventually turned into a cake which the orphans eat. The robbers then use their wealth to buy the orphanage, which becomes a haven for all orphaned children; eventually growing into a large town with its residents revering the robbers by wearing red caps and capes and building three towers, one for each of the three robbers.

=== Characters and voice cast ===
- Elena Kreil (German dub) and Taylor Bertman (English Dub) as Tiffany, a kindhearted, bubbly, and mischievous orphan girl.
- Joachim Król (German dub) and Michael Sorich (English dub) as Robber Dominik, the youngest of the brothers who has a blunderbuss to threaten passengers.
- Bela B. (German dub) and Lex Lang (English dub) as Robber Felix, the middle brother who has a pepper-blower to blind horses.
- Joachim Król (German dub) and Joachim Król (English dub) as Robber Maximus, the leader of the robbers, and the oldest of the brothers, who has a huge red axe to vandalize carriage wheels.
- Katharina Thalbach (German dub) and Charity James (English dub) as the Evil Auntie, the cruel, sadistic, and heartless caretaker of the orphanage who has a huge sweet tooth.
- Hayo Freitag (German dub) and Michael Sorich (English dub) as the Policeman, the strict and no-nonsense Scottish-accented police officer, who makes it his job to arrest the robbers and make sure that the kids are in the care of the Evil Auntie, whose abusive nature is something that he is unaware of.
- Erwin Leder (German dub) and Terrence Stone (English dub) as the Coachman Frog, a cold and heartless coachman with the traits of a frog, and the Evil Auntie's assistant.
- Maximilian Roca Jungfer (German dub) and Cole Sand (English dub) as Nikolas, a runaway orphan and a friend of Gregory.
- Konstantin Seidenstücker (German dub) and Gabe Eggerling (English dub) as Gregory, another runaway orphan and a friend of Nikolas.
- Paulette Victor Lifton as the Children of the Orphanage, the sad and miserable orphaned children who are abused by their wicked caretaker, that is until they find happiness with the three robbers.
- The Slow Unicorn, a unicorn-like being who is regularly seen in the forest.
- Tomi Ungeger (German dub) and Roger Jackson (English dub) as Mr. Narrator, the narrator of the story, who explains to the audience the origins of Halloween.

=== Production ===
The book was adapted as a full-length feature film by Hayo Freitag, released in mid-2007 as Die drei Räuber. This was adapted into a French version called Les Trois Brigands then an English one called Trick or Treaters, which removed the original narration by Tomi Ungerer along with cutting out some of the original movie to shorten it and added a Halloween theme with the new narrator.
