= Fierro (film) =

Martín Fierro, La Película
- English: Martín Fierro, The Movie
- Directed by: Liliana Romero; Norman Ruiz; Victoria Aizenstat; Liliana Romero; Norman Ruiz
- Written by: Enrique Cortés; Roberto Fontanarrosa; Horacio Grinberg; José Hernández; Martin Méndez
- Produced by: Claudio Corbelli; Horacio Grinberg; Pablo RovitoFernando Sokolowicz
- Edited by: Fabio Pallero; Norman Ruiz
- Music by: Mauro Lazzaro; Mauro Lázaro
- Release date: November 8, 2007 (Argentina)
- Running time: 88 minutes
- Country: Argentina
- Language: Spanish

Fierro, also known as Martín Fierro: La Película (Martín Fierro: The Movie), is a 2007 Argentine animated film directed by Liliana Romero and Norman Ruiz. It was written by Horacio Grinberg and Roberto Fontanarrosa and based on the classic poem Martín Fierro, which was written by José Hernández between 1872 and 1879. All the characters designs were created by Fontanarrosa. It was released on November 8, 2007.

== Summary ==
The movie is a recreation of the first part of Argentina's classic national book, the gaucho poem Martín Fierro, written by José Hernández in 1872. It tells the story of a gaucho named Martín Fierro, who is forcefully taken by the government to join the militias and fight against the indigenous people on the frontier. After a long time, Fierro returns to his homeland, but he has lost his family and his ranch. Grief and anger drive him to become a gaucho matrero, meaning a gaucho outside the law, and after committing some crimes, he is pursued by the police. However, Fierro doesn't give up and fights back at every opportunity.
