= Bratz Kidz =

American fashion doll and media franchise

Bratz Kidz Logo

Bratz Kidz were the elementary-aged child equivalent to the popular Bratz doll line; the dolls were six inches (152.4 mm) tall and are proportioned to be shorter than the normal Bratz.

== Produced characters ==
Bratz Kidz are based on the original Bratz dolls:

- Cloe (Angel)
- Yasmin (Pretty Princess)
- Jade (Kool Kat)
- Sasha (Bunny Boo)
- Lilani (Sweet Swan)
- Kiani (Prankster Parrot)
- Meygan (Funky Fashion Monkey)
- Dana (Sugar Shoes)
- Eitan (The Dragon)
- Koby (The Panther)
- Dylan (The Fox)
- Cameron (The Blaze)
- Phoebe (Sugar)
- Vinessa (Stylin' Sheep)
- Cade (The Viper)
- Katia (Flirty Turtle)
- Fianna (Fragrance)

== Popularity and Publicity ==
The Bratz Kidz are marketed to represent the innocence of children that normal Bratz and Babyz do not have and are modeled after their main fanbase, eight- to twelve-year-old girls. With long skirts and printed T-shirts, the kidz have separated themselves from the Bratz and Bratz Babyz lines with an air of innocence.

=== Slogans ===
- "The Kidz with a passion For Fun!"
- "Bigger than Babyz! Gonna be teens! We're Bratz Kidz, we're in between!"
- "How do you play? The Bratz Kidz way!"

=== Price and Value ===
The basic Bratz Kidz typically retail for $10.00 US for one doll plus an extra fashion. Bratz Kidz in special collections, like Horseback Fun and Sleepover Adventure, will usually sell for around $14.99 each. The Sisterz set of Babyz Kiani and Kidz Lilani and babyz Zama and kidz Sasha is sold for around $19.99. Bratz Kidz playsets, which sometimes come with one Bratz Kidz doll, retail for anywhere from $30–50, depending on what features and accessories are included.

== Filmography ==
=== Bratz Kidz: Sleep-Over Adventure ===
The first Bratz Kidz film was released on July 31, 2007. Like the other 3-D Bratz films, it was released straight to DVD. The film—adapted on the Kidz 'Sleep-Over Adventure' line—centers around a new character to the Bratz franchise, named Ginger, who invites Jade, Sasha, Meygan, Cloe and Yasmin to her sleepover to make new friends. The spooky stories that the girls tell are the main feature of the film.

==== Cast ====
- Cloe - Britt McKillip
- Jade - Nicole Muñoz (Sleep-Over Adventure) and Kali Edmeston (Fairy Tales)
- Sasha - Dorla Bell
- Yasmin - Bridgette Taylor (Sleep-Over Adventure) and Claire Renaud (Fairy Tales)
- Meygan - Jianna Ballard
- Dana - Chantal Strand
- Gabby - Gabberilla Rodgers
- Ginger - Cherilynn Fulbright

===== Songs =====
- We're Bratz Kidz (Bratz Kidz)
- Ready For Anything (Bratz Kidz)
- Whatever You Do (Yasmin)
- Step One (Jade)

===== Video games =====
- Bratz Kidz: Slumber Party! for Wii and DS

=== Spooky Stories ===
Sasha - Meygan, Yasmin and Sasha go to the hall of mirrors at a carnival. Sasha accidentally lets her doppelganger out of a mirror when Yasmin and Meygan leave. Then Sasha gets frightened of the doppelganger, who taunts her. She runs through the carnival and then sees her friends again, but her doppelganger pushes them out of the way. Then Sasha gets trapped in the mirror.

Cloe - Cloe wants a puppy, so her parents tell her if she does a good job dog-sitting Mrs. Winters' dog Taco, she can have her own puppy. Cloe gets a shock when she gets the dog back home and finds out he can talk, but Taco is also very manipulative and mischievous, he forces Cloe to order a pizza for him and sleep on the floor. Cloe brings Taco back to Mrs. Winters. Finally, Cloe gets a puppy, who's strongly implied to be just as mischievous as Taco.

Meygan - Meygan's older sister, Tanya and her friend Callie take her to the carnival, but boss her around and only do the things they want to do. Meygan is asked to be the volunteer for a magic show, and she wishes for everyone to go away because she is annoyed. However, her wish comes true, and she finds she's the only one at the carnival. Then Meygan gets frightened by the many clowns and the fact the ride she always wanted to go to never ends now. Changing her mind on how she wanted to be alone, she goes back to where the magic show was. Then she makes up a spell on the spot, and everyone appears.

Yasmin - Yasmin goes to the mall to buy her friend Dana a birthday present but ends up buying a charm bracelet for herself instead. The bracelet haunts Yasmin and reappears no matter how many times she gets rid of it. Then Yasmin discovers she should get rid of her charm bracelet. Later at Dana's house, Yasmin gives Dana the charm bracelet, Dana thinks the bracelet is perfect for her because she always loses jewelry. Unlike Yasmin, she loves the bracelet.

Jade - Cloe, Yasmin, Sasha, and Jade go to the carnival to go on a ghost train-like ride. Jade is rude to the others and insists she is not scared. Once inside the ride, she spoils it for the others by telling them everything is fake. Then, Cloe, Sasha, and Yasmin turn into monsters, and Jade realizes she must escape the ride. Jade runs away, being chased by monsters, but discovers that the monsters can only move when she does, and she distracts them with a dance. Then she runs away from the monsters and gets back to the doom buggy, screaming and closing her eyes. Finally, Cloe, Yasmin, and Sasha, who are humans again, comfort Jade, and the ride is over.

=== Bratz Kidz: Fairy Tales ===
The second Bratz Kidz film contains excerpts from fairy tales. As Cloe, Jade, Sasha and Yasmin put on a show about fairy tales for the kindergartners at their school, they think the characters they are supposed to be playing—as Rapunzel, Snow White, Red Riding Hood and Cinderella are all wimps—they could deal with the situations way better. Suddenly, a Chadwick Grimm appears and tells them off for dissing the fairy tale heroines. The girls are sent to Fairy Tale World to prove they could handle the situations better themselves. After Cloe as Rapunzel tries to escape the tower, Jade as Snow White tried to live with The 7-D's, Sasha as Red Riding Hood tries outsmarting the cunning wolf and Yasmin as Cinderella tries to escape her ugly, evil sisters and get to the ball, they realize they shouldn't misjudge someone before they have spent a day in their shoes.

==== Characters ====
- Cloe (Rapunzel) Cloe thinks escaping Rapunzel's witch will be a piece of cake, but she soon learns it is not as easy as she thinks it will be! She is the guitar player in the play. She is the lead singer and guitar in the play.
- Yasmin (Cinderella) Yasmin got to the ball because the step sisters and step mother let her. An opposite from the real story. She plays keyboard in play.
- Sasha (Little Red Riding Hood) Sasha thinks she is so much smarter than Little Red Riding Hood but soon learns not to judge others before they have walked a mile in their shoes. She often makes up funny jokes and plays the bass in the play.
- Jade (Snow White) Jade can't believe that Snow White did not get a pay check for cleaning and cooking for the seven dwarves. She gets angry when the dwarves insult girls. She plays the drum kit in the play.
- Ginger is a character made for Bratz Kidz Sleepover Adventure. She lives in Sasha’s neighborhood.

==== Songs ====
- I've Opened My Eyes (Cloe and backup from Sasha)
- Are You Sure? (The 7-D's)
- 'Round & 'Round (Cloe)

== Products ==
=== Doll lines ===
==== 2006 ====
- 1st edition: Cloe, Jade, Sasha, Yasmin
- Sisterz: Kiani & Lilani
- Ice Champions: Cloe, Yasmin (Toys R Us exclusive)
- Sisterz 2nd Edition: Sasha & Zama (UK exclusive)
- Forever Diamondz: Cloe, Yasmin (Target exclusive) Bratz Kidz Fairy Tales

==== 2007 ====
- Sleepover Adventure: Yasmin, Cloe, Meygan, Sasha
- 2nd Edition: Yasmin, Cloe, Jade, Sasha
- Magic Hair: Dana (Target exclusive)
- Kidz Summer Vacation: Cloe, Sasha, Jade, Yasmin, Carlyn
- Horseback Fun: Cloe, Dana, Sasha, Yasmin
- Horses: Cassidy, Honey, Jubilee, Morgan, Piper, Sapphire, Jumper
- Fashion Pixiez: Lilani (Toys R Us exclusive)
- Pampered Pupz: Yasmin (Walmart exclusive)
- Adventure Girlz: Cloe (Kmart exclusive)
- Birthday: Cloe and Yasmin (Walmart exclusive)
- Kidz Boyz: Koby, Eitan, Dylan, Cameron (Release 2008)
- School: Meygan, Cloe, Sasha, Yasmin
- 3rd Edition: Cloe, Jade, Sasha, Yasmin
- Winter Vacation: Phoebe Sasha, Cloe and Yasmin
- Horseback Fun: Yasmin w/doll horse (Toys R Us exclusive)
- Costume Party: Cloe, Yasmin (Genuardi's exclusive)
- Bratz The Movie Kidz: Cloe, Yasmin (Sam's Club exclusive)

==== 2008 ====
- Nighty-Nite: Yasmin, Cloe, Sasha
- Glam: Yasmin, Cloe, Sasha
- 4th Edition: Sasha, Cloe, Yasmin
- 5th Edition: Sasha, Cloe, Yasmin
- Kidz Boyz 2nd Edition: Dylan, Cameron, Cade
- World Familiez: Yasmin and Her Mom Portia (first appearance), Cloe and Her Mom Polita (first appearance), Cloe and Her Sister Sonya (first appearance)
- Dress Up: Cloe, Yasmin, Sasha
- Concert: Cloe, Yasmin, Sasha, Katia
- Wild West: Yasmin

==== 2009 ====
- Sassy Style: Cloe, Yasmin, Sasha, Fianna
- Swimmin Mermaid: Cloe, Yasmin
- Hair Crazy: Cloe, Yasmin, Sasha
- Sleepover (Snap-on): Cloe, Yasmin, Sasha
- Play Sportz: Cloe, Yasmin
- Wintertime: Cloe, Yasmin
- Fashion Petz: Cloe, Yasmin

=== Playsets and vehicles ===
==== 2006 ====
- RC Scooter with Yasmin
- Super Secret Lipgloss Laundromat with Cloe
- Super Secret Make-up Vanity with Jade
- Tandem Bike with Cloe and Yasmin

==== 2007 ====
- Super Secret Manicure Bedroom with Dana
- Super Secret Lotion Making Bathroom with Phoebe
- Super Secret Water Park with Carlyn
- Super Secret School Bus with Lilani
- Winter Vacation RC Vehicle with Dana
- Super Secret Ice Cream Making Snow Lodge with Vinessa

==== 2008 ====
- Concert Clubhouse with Katia

== Bratz Big Kidz ==
=== 2007 ===
- Big Kidz Music Starz: Cloe, Jade, Yasmin, Sasha
- Big Kidz Winter Vacation: Yasmin, Cloe (Walmart exclusive)

=== 2008 ===
- Big Kidz 2nd Edition : Yasmin, Cloe, Sasha
