= Warrior (2007 film) =

- Release date: July 6, 2007
- Country: China
- Language: Mandarin
- Budget: 15 million yuan

Warrior (Chinese: 勇士, literal: "brave warrior") is a Chinese animated film produced by Shanghai Animation Film Studio.

== Plot ==
Based on a Mongolian folklore, the story begins with a young warrior Barter coming to Balin Grassland. He rescues a young girl from a herd of running horses and finds out she is the daughter of the wrestling coach working for the grassland lord. Barter starts learning wrestling while working for the grassland lord as a coolie. Barter falls in love with the girl he saved. However, there is a reason for his coming to the grassland – he is looking for the man who killed his father.

== Production ==
Shanghai Animation Film Studio produced the film as its sixth animated feature, to mark its 50th anniversary. It took four years to produce and cost 15 million yuan (US$2 million).

== See also ==
- List of animated feature-length films
