= Tengers =

- Directed by: Michael J. Rix
- Written by: Michael J. Rix
- Produced by: Michael J. Rix
- Starring: Michael J. Rix; Jo Day; Rob Vega; Anton Schmidt; Phillip Mathebula
- Distributed by: Mirror Mountain Pictures; Ster Kinekor Pictures; Filmhub
- Release date: 19 October 2007
- Running time: 68 min.
- Country: South Africa
- Language: English
- Budget: US$250,000

Tengers is a 2007 South African animated film written, directed and produced by Michael J. Rix. It is the first full-length animation produced in South Africa and uses the claymation technique.

The film is a satirical black comedy about life in post-Apartheid South Africa. Rix has said his intention was to make a film that was: "Entertaining but not frivolous. Political but not preachy. Sophisticated but not alienating."

== Synopsis ==
The film opens with Rob's mistaken arrest for bank robbery. He explains to Marius that he was wearing the balaclava because he was cold, and that carrying a gun is standard practice in Johannesburg. In fact, he was at the bank to see Christine. She is the artist responsible for the "Remembrance Wall," a memorial to the victims of violent crime in the city. After meeting at the wall, Christine agrees to go on a date with Rob. After winning a fortune on a scratch card, Rob finds his life under threat and believes that the Lottery Service is trying to murder him to prevent him from claiming his prize. He is forced to hide amongst the city's underclass. The film ends with a western style shoot out during which the killer is revealed to be Marius and Christine is killed. Rob reflects on the harsh realities of life in modern South Africa.

== Characters ==
- Rob, an unemployed writer, working on the "great South African novel".
- Marius, Rob's friend, struggling to make ends meet on a meagre cop's salary.
- Christine, a bank teller and artist. She is also the girl of Rob's dreams.

=== Minor characters ===
Minor characters include: Vusi, a taxi driver; Jack, a professional carjacker; and Fud, a homeless beggar.

== Notes ==
- Rix shot the film over the course of nine years in Johannesburg.
- The term Tengers was coined by Rix himself to refer to residents of Gauteng province.

== See also ==
- List of animated feature-length films
- List of stop-motion films
