= Detective Conan: Jolly Roger in the Deep Azure =

- Theatrical release poster
- Kanji: 名探偵コナン 紺碧の棺(ジョリー・ロジャー)
- Revised Hepburn: Meitantei Konan: Kon Peki no Jorī Rojā
- Directed by: Yasuichiro Yamamoto
- Written by: Hiroshi Kashiwabara
- Based on: Case Closed by Gosho Aoyama
- Produced by: Michihiko Suwa
- Starring: Minami Takayama; Kappei Yamaguchi; Akira Kamiya; Wakana Yamazaki; Naoko Matsui; Megumi Hayashibara; Yukiko Iwai; Ikue Ohtani; Wataru Takagi; Kenichi Ogata; Atsuko Yuya; Kazuhiko Inoue; Chafurin
- Edited by: Terumitsu Okada
- Music by: Katsuo Ono; Hisako Ono; Ryo Watanabe
- Production company: TMS Entertainment
- Distributed by: Toho
- Release date: April 21, 2007
- Running time: 95 minutes
- Country: Japan
- Language: Japanese
- Box office: ¥ 2.53 billion (US$ 25.6 million)

Detective Conan: Jolly Roger in the Deep Azure (名探偵コナン 紺碧の棺(ジョリー・ロジャー), Meitantei Konan: Kon Peki no Jorī Rojā) is a 2007 Japanese animated mystery swashbuckler film released on April 21, 2007. It is the 11th film in the Case Closed series. This film brought in 2.53 billion yen (US$ 25.6 million).

== Plot ==
Wataru Takagi and Miwako Sato chase thieves wearing Lupin III and Fujiko Mine masks that robbed a supermarket. The thieves are injured in a car accident. One faints, while the other is questioned. He mentions the island named Koumijima and Jolly Roger. Meanwhile at the hotel on Koumijima, Kogoro Mouri talks to the hotel receptionist with the Detective Boys, Dr. Agasa, Ran and Sonoko Suzuki behind him. Kogoro brags how he won 300,000 yen by finishing a crossword puzzle, which Conan Edogawa actually solved. The receptionist tells them their reservation was not found. At that moment, the department head of the Tourism Agency named Jouji Iwanaga confirms their reservation but saying it is not at the hotel.

Afterwards, three muscular men walk past them and Conan proclaims they're treasure hunters. Ayumi Yoshida, Mitsuhiko Tsuburaya and Genta Kojima are excited about a hidden treasure on the island. They are driven to an inn owned by Kasuo Mima. Iwanaga helps them plan their activities. The Detective Boys are going on a treasure hunt, Ran and Sonoko are going scuba diving, and Kogoro is going drinking. Ran and Sonoko go to the diving shop owned by Chika Mabuchi to rent some diving equipment. Kimiko Yamakuchi, the diving instructor, will come with them on their dive. Meanwhile, the Detective Boys are taught about the legend of the pirate duo, Anne Bonny and Mary Read and the treasure they buried on this island. Iwanaga then gives the Detective Boys treasure maps with five spots for stamps. The stamps are two numbers, either red or blue. They must find the locations via clues in treasure boxes beside the table for stamps. They get their first stamp in the museum. Their first clue is "Even if the setting sun is almost at its end, a pirate still shines." Iwanaga lets them rent bicycles and they start the search.

Back to Ran, Sonoko, and Kimiko, they are diving when they see a shark. They hide in the corner and find sharks surrounding the three treasure hunters, one soaked in blood and bleeding badly. The two men defend the wounded person, one by using his oxygen mask to blow oxygen at the sharks, and one by using his swimming motor to push them away. The three ladies bring the boat and the men climb onto the boat with their injured friend. Back with the Detective Boys, they found the second stamp in a cave with bio-luminescent plankton. The second clue is "The thin pirate would laugh." Ai Haibara tells Conan that she saw the boat that Ran used for diving and that someone was bleeding. Conan worried about it, follows the boat to the infirmary.

At the infirmary, Conan finds Ran is safe. The two men are praying for their partner's recovery, but he is pronounced dead. Conan, finding it suspicious that professional treasure hunters were attacked by sharks examines the dead partner's clothing. In his diving suit was a plastic bag with fish blood. He explains the deeper you go in water, the higher the pressure increases and that the bag exploded attracting the sharks. Just then, Kogoro comes through the window drunk. Ai sets up the evidence so it can be noticed by Kogoro. Kogoro proclaims to the people in the infirmary that a murder has taken place.

Conan goes to the diving shop to investigate since the diving suits are stored there. He learns that the shop does not fear thieves so it is never locked, making anyone the culprit. Back at the lodging, Conan discusses this with Agasa. The Detective Boys call Conan asking him for help and telling him they are at the hanging bridge. Ai decides to stay behind. Ayumi and Mitsuhiko cross the bridge while Genta follows slowly behind. A sign tells them that anyone that weighs more than 40 kg can not cross the bridge. Ayumi and Mitsuhiko figure out the clue, "The thin pirate would laugh, while the fat one would cry.". Ayumi and Mitsuhiko find the third stamp, and find the second clue, "Pirates don't cry." Conan comes and proclaims that sign is just a hint and is not the actual bridge limit and crosses. They all return to the lodge for dinner.

Back at the hotel, Juzo Megure, Takagi, and Sato arrive by helicopter to interrogate the two treasure hunters. The treasure hunters' names are revealed to be Izu Yamataro and Matsumoto Mitsushi. After refusal to cooperate, Takagi tricks one of the members into giving his fingerprints by giving them a match for their cigarettes. After dinner, Mima tells the Detective Boys what the crying pirates are. They go to the beach where when wet sand is stepped on, it makes the sound of a sob. They walk to the part where the sand does not sob and find an old broken boat.

Inside the boat, is the fourth stamp and the third clue "Pirate's souls will go to heaven." Conan notices that the treasure hunters are paying Mabuchi for something and finds it suspicious. He investigates and follows the treasure hunters. A little time before Conan's discovery, at the place where the officers came by plane, the alarm goes off to show that a disturbance in the museum was detected. They find out that Anne's gun and Mary's cutlass was stolen. Back with Conan, the treasure hunter are entering the car when they are shot far away by an unknown stranger. Conan examines where the shot was placed and finds tire tracks. He takes a picture of it.

The next day, Conan compares the tire tracks to the bikes. He discovers GPS trackers in a small number of bikes. After eating breakfast, the Detective Boys continue the treasure hunt, while Conan continues his investigation. While wandering, he overhears the investigation team, and hears that a storm is coming. He learns that the rifle that fired the bullets must be quite old and that Mima was the only one to own a rifle that old. Back to the Detective Boys, they find the final stamp and the last clue, "The numbers are the hints". The Detective Boys figure they should ask Mima. Conan asks Mima on where the treasure is since he is a treasure hunter. Ran and Sonoko visit Kimiko and they talk. The officer comes and ask for Mabuchi to come to the investigation room. Ran, Sonoko, and Kimiko leave the store only to be taken hostage by the treasure hunters.

Mima takes the kids and show them the original map made by Anne 300 years ago. It is exactly like the map Iwanaga gave the kids. They figure out the red and blue color on the numbers are for the first or surname. The numbers are actually letters from the English Alphabet. It spells out Jolly Roger, the flag of a pirate. The skull on the pirate flag on the 300-year-old map reveals the letters DOS DIOSAS, which in Spanish means Two Goddesses. It means the entrance to where the treasure is between two goddesses.

Back to the treasure hunters, Kimiko is knocked out. The treasure hunters take Ran and Sonoko on a boat toward the island named Yorioyajima (meaning Skull Island). Kimiko arrives to the inn and tell them they are being taken to Yorioyajima. Conan tells the Detective Boys to inform the officers and tells Mima to take him to the island. The professor gives two mini oxygen tanks that supply 10 minutes of oxygen to Conan.

Back to the treasure hunters, they are preparing to dive. They cut Sonoko to use her as bait and tell them to dive or else. They dive and enter the cave. Conan uses the original entrance and enters the cave above ground. The treasure hunter find the treasure room, to only find a boat with nothing precious on it. They are knocked out by Conan and his soccer ball. Conan tells Iwanaga to come out of hiding and knew that Conan was being followed. Conan revealed that Iwanaga set up the puzzle and got them to come to Koumijima, copied the treasure map, and shot the treasure hunters so he could get the treasure himself. After realizing there is no treasure, Iwanaga gives up.

Suddenly, an earthquake strikes and water starts to fill up the cave. The cave also releases methane clathrate. Conan tells everyone to go into the cabin while he kicks a chain into the ceiling to start a spark that will cause an explosion to blow open the ceiling. Conan gives Ran and Sonoko his oxygen masks and tells them to set the oxygen tanks on the criminals too. Ran asks him if he will be okay and Conan lies that he has a mask. Conan starts the explosion and jumps into the cabin just in time. The boat floods with water and Conan is saved by Ran sharing her mask.

The boat bursts out onto the ocean and finds the investigation crew's ship instantly. The boat they are on start to break and they jump into the ocean and climb onto the investigation boat. Mima says that the treasure was the boat and reveals more about Anne and Mary. Mary was caught and placed in prison so Anne set up the boat for one day when Mary would escape and they would sail the seas. He says that Mary died due to an illness in prison and that Anne waited till she died of old age.

In the post credits scene, Conan asks how Ran knew he did not have a mask. She tells him that like Shinichi Kudo, they give the same face when they are lying and has a flashback to when Shinichi gives her an umbrella while he walks home in the rain.

== Cast ==
- Minami Takayama as Conan Edogawa
  - Kappei Yamaguchi as Shinichi Kudo
- Wakana Yamazaki as Ran Mouri
- Akira Kamiya as Kogoro Mouri
- Chafurin as Juzo Megure
- Atsuko Yuya as Miwako Sato
- Kazuhiko Inoue as Ninzaburo Shiratori
- Kenichi Ogata as Dr. Hiroshi Agasa
- Ikue Ohtani as Mitsuhiko Tsuburaya
- Megumi Hayashibara as Ai Haibara
- Naoko Matsui as Sonoko Suzuki
- Wataru Takagi as Genta Kojima and Wataru Takagi
- Yukiko Iwai as Ayumi Yoshida

== Music ==
The theme song used for this song is "Like the Wind Across the Sea" (七つの海を渡る風のように, Nanatsu no Umi o Wataru Kaze no Yō ni) by Rina Aiuchi & U-ka Saegusa. It was released on April 11, 2007. Along with Magician of the Silver Sky, this was the second song for which the lyrics was produced by Rina Aiuchi.

The official soundtrack was released on April 18, 2007.

== Home media ==
=== DVD ===
The DVD of the film was released on 1 August 2011. The DVD contains the film in Dolby Digital 5.1 audio and widescreen.

=== Blu-ray ===
The Blu-ray version of the film was released on 30 September 2010. The Blu-ray contains the same content of the DVD plus a mini-booklet explaining the film and the BD-live function.
