= List of Oh My Goddess! episodes =

Oh My Goddess!, the manga by Kōsuke Fujishima, has been adapted into five anime versions between 1993 and 2007, including an original video animation (OVA), The Adventures of Mini-Goddess, Ah! My Goddess, and its sequels, Ah! My Goddess: Flights of Fancy and Ah! My Goddess: Fighting Wings.

In 1993, Anime International Company produced a five-episode OVA series based on the manga series. Its success inspired a spinoff TV series entitled The Adventures of Mini-Goddess. Produced by Oriental Light and Magic and initially aired on WOWOW in 1998 and 1999, the plot revolved around the adventures of three miniaturized goddesses and their rat companion Gan-chan, all of whom live in a temple home. In 2005, Tokyo Broadcasting System (TBS) began broadcasting Ah! My Goddess, a new series directed by Hiroaki Gōda and animated by Anime International Company. It ran for 24 episodes between January 7 and July 8, 2005. A sequel also animated by Anime International Company and directed by Gōda, Ah! My Goddess: Flights of Fancy, aired on TBS between April 6 and September 14, 2006. A two-episode special entitled Ah! My Goddess: Fighting Wings, animated by Anime International Company and directed by Gōda, was broadcast on TBS on December 9, 2007.

Each series was licensed to a different American publisher. AnimEigo received the rights to publish the OVA in Region 1 and released five VHS tapes and two DVDs. The Adventures of Mini-Goddess was licensed to Geneon Entertainment (under their old name, Pioneer Entertainment) and was released to four DVDs. Ah! My Goddess was licensed by Media Blasters, who released all 26 episodes on 6 DVD compilations. However, Media Blasters declined the sequel (Ah! My Goddess: Flights of Fancy); it was instead licensed to ADV Films, who released six DVD compilations. and then to Funimation, who later released a boxset on November 25, 2008. Thirteen pieces of theme music are used in the different series: four opening themes and nine ending themes. The Japanese production companies or the holders of the licenses in Region 1 released several soundtracks and drama CDs as well.

== OVA series ==
=== First series ===
From late 1993 to early 1994, the Oh My Goddess! (ああっ女神さまっ, Aa! Megami-sama) original video animation series was produced by Anime International Company, featuring the central characters of Kosuke Fujishima's Oh My Goddess! series. It is distributed by Pony Canyon in Japan and by AnimEigo in North America. The English dub was produced by Coastal Carolina Studios. The storyline initially parallels the early parts of the original manga and is similar to early episodes of the later 2005 TV series; the first three episodes of the OVA cover the same story as episodes one through ten of the 2005 series. However, episodes four and five do not follow the manga or any other TV series.

The series was initially released straight to VHS between February 21, 1993, and May 17, 1994. It was reissued twice in North America on VHS and LaserDisc format: once between June 29, 1994, and August 31, 1994 and again between May 29, 1996, and June 28, 1996. It was also released to two DVDs on August 14, 2001, and October 9, 2001, respectively.

Both the opening theme, "I Can't Confess My Heart, I Wanna Confirm Your Heart" (My Heart 言い出せない, Your Heart 確かめたい, My Heart Iidasenai, Your Heart Tashikametai), and the ending theme, "Congratulations", are sung by the Goddess Family Club.

No.	Title	Original release date
1	"Moonlight and Cherry Blossoms"	February 21, 1993
Trying to phone a takeout restaurant, Keiichi Morisato, a student at the Nekomi Institute of Technology and member of the Auto Club, accidentally dials the "Goddess Helpline" and summons a goddess named Belldandy. Belldandy offers to grant him a single wish; Keiichi requests that Belldandy stay with him forever. The wish is approved, activating the "Ultimate Force," which prevents them from being separated. When they are driven out from the men-only dormitory, they search for lodgings for the night, but to no avail. Eventually, following Belldandy's lead, they reach an old temple. The next morning, Belldandy magically restores the temple to its former beauty before Keiichi awakens. Later that day, Keiichi's sister Megumi Morisato arrives and asks for a place to stay for a few days while she finds a permanent residence. The members of the Auto Club show up and a lively party takes place as the day ends.
2	"Midsummer Night's Dream"	May 21, 1993
Five months have passed since Keiichi and Belldandy began living together, but their relationship has not progressed. As summer vacation approaches, Keiichi (with prompting from Megumi) decides to take Belldandy to the ocean. While Belldandy and Megumi are shopping, Keiichi decides to watch a film that has mysteriously arrived in the mail. To Keiichi's surprise, Urd, Belldandy's elder sister, steps out of the television. They arrive at the beach and Urd reveals to Keiichi that she has secretly tagged along to help bring the couple together. However, Keiichi almost drowns after a boating accident and Urd's love potion causes Keiichi to fall in love with Sayoko Mishima by mistake. Urd's presence is revealed when Belldandy recognizes Urd's hand in the events, and a kiss from Belldandy brings Keiichi back to his senses. Urd's trip to Earth has caused problems in heaven. As punishment, she is forced to remain on Earth. She moves in with Keiichi and Belldandy.
3	"Burning Hearts on the Road"	September 21, 1993
Skuld, Belldandy's younger sister, is overworked from hunting bugs in heaven. A bored Urd continues to get in everyone's way on Earth by accidentally exploding a cake Belldandy is making and an engine Keiichi is repairing. Lonely and overworked, Skuld comes to Earth and tries to convince Belldandy to return with her. Keiichi is working hard to build a motorbike for an upcoming drag race. With Skuld's help, they complete the bike in spite of the difficulties posed by Toraichi Tamiya and Hikozaemon Otaki, leaders of the Auto Club. On the day of the race, Toshiyuki Aoshima, leader of a rival club, reveals that Belldandy is the prize for the race – the winning club will gain her as a member. Skuld, still hoping that Belldandy will leave Keiichi to return with her, tampers with the rival club's bike so that Keiichi cannot win. In the final race, Keiichi wins after taking the flag when the other bike's engine fails.
4	"Evergreen Holy Night"	December 28, 1993
Keiichi has a nightmare about Belldandy. He wakes up to discover the ground inside the temple covered with snow; however, the ground outside is snow-free. Skuld identifies the problem as a bug and creates a bug-catching machine, setting everything back to normal. She notes that the bugs form when Belldandy and Keiichi are too close. The Almighty notifies Belldandy that she will be recalled in three days. When the couple travels to school, they do so separately, prompting rumors that they have split up. Once Belldandy tries to get closer to Keiichi, explosions cause chaos and Belldandy flees. Megumi suggests that Keiichi buy a ring for Belldandy, and so he works part-time jobs to earn money to pay for one. Urd and Skuld identify a cherry tree near the temple as the source of the bugs, but on informing Belldandy, Belldandy becomes upset.
5	"For the Love of Goddess"	May 17, 1994
Keiichi, unable to meet directly with Belldandy, apologizes and continues to work. Despite Urd and Skuld's efforts, they cannot find a way to remove the bugs created when Belldandy and Keiichi are too close. They resort to the Ultimate Magic Circle, a forbidden magic, as a solution. Keiichi eventually earns enough to purchase the ring. The sisters complete their research of the Ultimate Magic Circle. Belldandy, crying, removes all traces of herself from the temple and begins to depart through the gate. Keiichi arrives as she is departing and Urd casts her spell, closing the gate. Keiichi and the goddesses are thrown back in the ensuing explosion and Belldandy enters Keiichi's consciousness to save him. In a flashback, it is revealed that Keiichi and Belldandy met as youths prior to their current meeting, and they made a forbidden promise that forces her to seal all of Keiichi's memories of that meeting. As Keiichi's memories return, the system malfunctions. When he finally wakes up, The Almighty rescinds his order for Belldandy to return and Keiichi gives her the promised ring.

=== Ah! My Goddess (2011) ===
1. episode 1 bundled with manga vol. 42 special edition
2. episode 2 bundled with manga vol. 43 special edition
3. episode 3 released prior bundled with manga vol. 46

Three pieces of music themes was used. "Everlasting" by FripSide used as the opening theme song. For episodes 1 and 2 "Friendship" (友情, Yuujou) and episode 3 "THIS LOVE" sung by the Goddess Family Club are the closing theme song.

No.	Title	Original release date
1	"Always Together"; Transliteration: "Itsumo Futari de" (Japanese: いつも二人で)	February 23, 2011
2	"Hunters & Hunters" (Japanese: ハンターズ&ハンターズ)	September 22, 2011
3	"DIVE! LIVE! LOVE!"	September 8, 2013

== Television series ==
=== The Adventures of Mini-Goddess ===
The Adventures of Mini-Goddess, or, when literally translated from its original Japanese title, Ah! My Goddess: Being Small is Convenient, is a Japanese animated TV series and that had 48 episodes aired during its run from 1998 to 1999. It was directed by Hiroko Kazui and Yasuhiro Matsumura and was produced by Oriental Light and Magic. It premiered as a part of the omnibus show Anime Complex on WOWOW. In Region 1, it was licensed to and distributed by Geneon Entertainment, formerly known as Pioneer Entertainment. The series does not follow the manga closely; instead, it describes the adventures of the miniaturized three goddesses and their rat companion Gan-chan, who live in their temple home.

In Japan, the season was released by Pony Canyon on both DVD and VHS. Six VHS tapes were released between December 18, 1998, and October 20, 1999. Later, six DVDs were released between May 19, 1999, and October 20, 1999. A boxed set was released to Japan on February 20, 2008. For Region 1, the season was licensed to Geneon Entertainment, under the name Pioneer Entertainment. They released the season to four DVD compilations, each containing 12 episodes, between February and August 2002. Like Pony Canyon, Geneon Entertainment released a limited-edition boxed set of the DVDs on July 1, 2003.

The Adventures of Mini-Goddess has two pieces of theme music, both of which are ending themes. "Call Me Darling" (デンワしてダーリン, Denwa Shite Dārin) by Yuki Ishii served as the ending theme for episodes 1–24, and "XXX (Kiss Kiss Kiss)" by Splash! served as the ending theme for episodes 25–48.

No.	Title	Original release date
1	"Let's Tell Your Fortune"; Transliteration: "Uranai Shiyō yo!" (Japanese: 占いしようよ)	April 6, 1998
2	"Secret Treasure in the Attic, Part I"; Transliteration: "Yaneura no Hihō (Zenpen)" (Japanese: 屋根裏の秘宝(前編))	April 13, 1998
3	"Secret Treasure in the Attic, Part II"; Transliteration: "Yaneura no Hihō (Kōhen)" (Japanese: 屋根裏の秘宝(後編))	April 20, 1998
4	"Let's Fly in the Sky"; Transliteration: "Sora o Tobō yo" (Japanese: 空を飛ぼうよ)	April 27, 1998
5	"Let's Fly into Space"; Transliteration: "Uchū o Tobō yo" (Japanese: 宇宙を飛ぼうよ)	May 11, 1998
6	"Slimming Down! Go!"; Transliteration: "Surimu de Gō!" (Japanese: スリムでGO!)	May 18, 1998
7	"Gabira, the Giant Monster – The Birth"; Transliteration: "Daikaijū Gabira Tanjōhen" (Japanese: 大怪獣ガビラ 誕生編)	May 25, 1998
8	"Gabira – The Final Battle"; Transliteration: "Daikaijū Gabira Kessenhen" (Japanese: 大怪獣ガビラ決戦編)	June 1, 1998
9	"For Whom the Bell Tolls – The Mysterious Can of Food"; Transliteration: "Ta ga Tame ni Kane wa Naru: Kanzume no Nazo...?" (Japanese: 〜誰がために鐘は鳴る〜 缶詰の謎...?)	June 8, 1998
10	"For Whom the Bell Tolls – The Secret of the Diamond"; Transliteration: "Ta ga Tame ni Kane wa Naru: Daiya no Himitsu" (Japanese: 〜誰がために鐘は鳴る〜 ダイヤの秘密)	June 15, 1998
11	"Gabira – The Strike Back"; Transliteration: "Daikaijū Gabira Gyakushūhen" (Japanese: 大怪獣ガビラ逆襲編)	June 22, 1998
12	"Let's Play Baseball"; Transliteration: "Yakyū Yarōze!" (Japanese: 野球やろうぜ!)	June 29, 1998
13	"Urd's Babysitting Adventures"; Transliteration: "Urudo no Komori Nikki" (Japanese: ウルドの子守日記)	July 6, 1998
14	"The Proposal Scheme"; Transliteration: "Puropozu Daisakusen Desu da!" (Japanese: プロポーズ大作戦ですだ!)	July 13, 1998
15	"Welcome, Newlyweds!"; Transliteration: "Shinkon-san Irasshai!! Desu da!" (Japanese: 新婚さんいらっしゃい!!ですだ!)	July 20, 1998
16	"Phone Me, Darling"; Transliteration: "Denwashite Dārin" (Japanese: *電話してダーリン*)	July 27, 1998
17	"SOS in the Big Snowfield, Part One"; Transliteration: "Daisetsugen Esuōesu (Zenpen)" (Japanese: 大雪原SOS(前編))	August 3, 1998
18	"SOS in the Big Snowfield, Part Two"; Transliteration: "Daisetsugen Esuōesu (Kōhen)" (Japanese: 大雪原SOS(後編))	August 10, 1998
19	"Kitchen Fighters"; Transliteration: "Kitchin Faitā" (Japanese: キッチンファイター)	August 24, 1998
20	"Gan-chan's Magnificent Days"; Transliteration: "Gan-chan no Karei Naru Hibi" (Japanese: 岩ちゃんの華麗なる日々)	August 31, 1998
21	"Ah! My Buddha"; Transliteration: "Aa! Hotoke-sama!" (Japanese: ああっ!仏さま!)	September 7, 1998
22	"The Story of Gan-chan: Love Me to the Bone"; Transliteration: "Gan-chan no Hone Made Aishite" (Japanese: 岩ちゃんの骨まで愛して)	September 14, 1998
23	"Let's Form a Band! Side A"; Transliteration: "Bando Yarōze! Ei Omote" (Japanese: バンドやろうぜ!A 表)	September 21, 1998
24	"Let's Form a Band! Side B"; Transliteration: "Bando Yarōze! Bī Omote" (Japanese: バンドやろうぜ!B 表)	September 28, 1998
25	"Chu-Hard – Gan-chan's Desperate Situation"; Transliteration: "Chū Hādo – Gan-chan Zettai Zetsumei" (Japanese: Chu-Hard - 岩ちゃん絶体絶命)	October 5, 1998
26	"Chu-Hard 2 - Descent of the Devil"; Transliteration: "Chū Hādo Tsū – Maō Kōrin" (Japanese: Chu-Hard 2 - 魔王降臨)	October 12, 1998
27	"Pop! Goes the Urd!"; Transliteration: "Urudo de Pon!" (Japanese: ウルドでポン!)	October 19, 1998
28	"Rainy Day"	October 26, 1998
29	"Let's Meet in Our Dreams"; Transliteration: "Chikyū Saigo no Kessen / Yume de Aimashō" (Japanese: 地球最後の決戦 / 夢で逢いましょう)	November 2, 1998
30	"Female Detective Skuld's First Case... Mystery of Three Stolen Treasures: The Dangerous Trap Hidden in Steamy Smoke!"; Transliteration: "Onna Meitantei Sukurudo no Jikenbo Wan – Nusumareta Mittsu no Hihō no Nazo Yukemori Kakusareta Kiken na Wana!" (Japanese: 女名探偵スクルドの事件簿 1 盗まれた三つの秘宝の謎 湯煙に隠された危険な罠!)	November 9, 1998
31	"Goddess Love Theater – Goddess Blade"; Transliteration: "Megami Ai no Gekijō – Megami no Ken" (Japanese: 女神愛の劇場 - 女神の剣)	November 16, 1998
32	"Quick Fix Division of the Tariki Hongan Temple"; Transliteration: "Kochira Tariki Honganji-nai Sugu Yaru Ka" (Japanese: こちら他力本願寺内 すぐやる課)	November 30, 1998
33	"Fishing Journal"; Transliteration: "Tsuri Basu Nisshi" (Japanese: 釣りバス日誌)	December 7, 1998
34	"Give Me Some Servants"; Transliteration: "Ware ni Shimobe o" (Japanese: 我にしもべを)	December 14, 1998
35	"Rules of the Ninja, Volume I"; Transliteration: "Shinobi no Okite Ue no Maki" (Japanese: 忍びの掟 上の巻)	December 21, 1998
36	"Rules of the Ninja, Volume II"; Transliteration: "Shinobi no Okite Shimo no Maki" (Japanese: 忍びの掟 下の巻)	January 4, 1999
37	"Urd vs. Urd"; Transliteration: "Urudo tai Urudo" (Japanese: ウルド対ウルド)	January 11, 1999
38	"Gan-chan Runs for Election "Being Self-Made" Edition"; Transliteration: "Gan-chan Senkyo ni Tatsu Risshi Hen" (Japanese: 岩ちゃん選挙に立つ 立志編)	January 18, 1999
39	"Gan-chan Runs for Election "Times of Change" Edition"; Transliteration: "Gan-chan Senkyo ni Tatsu Fūun Hen" (Japanese: 岩ちゃん選挙に立つ 風雲編)	January 25, 1999
40	"Urd's Ultimate Diet"; Transliteration: "Urudo Kyūkyoku Daietto" (Japanese: ウルド究極ダイエット)	February 1, 1999
41	"Happy Birthday, Gan-chan"; Transliteration: "Happī Bāsudei Gan-chan!" (Japanese: ハッピーバースデイ岩ちゃん)	February 8, 1999
42	"Ah! My Average College Student"; Transliteration: "Aa! Heibon na Daigakusei!" (Japanese: ああ!平凡な大学生!)	February 15, 1999
43	"This Happens Once in a While"; Transliteration: "Konna Koto mo Arunda ne" (Japanese: こんなこともあるんだね)	February 22, 1999
44	"Gan-chan the Locomotive"; Transliteration: "Kikansha Gan-chan" (Japanese: 機関車岩ちゃん)	March 1, 1999
45	"The Miso Jar"; Transliteration: "Miso no Tsubo" (Japanese: 味噌の壺)	March 8, 1999
46	"Deluxe Game of Life"; Transliteration: "Derakkusu Jinsei Sugoroku" (Japanese: DX人生すごろく)	March 15, 1999
47	"Mekimeki High School Memorial"; Transliteration: "Mekimeki Memoriaru" (Japanese: めきめきメモリアル)	March 22, 1999
48	"What'll Happen Next?"; Transliteration: "Korekara Dō Naru no?" (Japanese: これからどうなるの?)	March 29, 1999

=== Ah! My Goddess ===
The episodes of the Japanese anime television series Ah! My Goddess are directed by Hiroaki Gōda, animated by Anime International Company, and produced by Tokyo Broadcasting System (TBS) and Kodansha. The series focuses on the beginning of the manga series, when Keiichi summons Belldandy and wishes for her to remain with him forever and uses material from the first 20 volumes of the series over 24 episodes.

The season began in Japan, on TBS, on January 7, 2005, and ended on July 8, 2005. Bandai Visual released eight DVD compilations in Japan between April and November 2005, each containing three episodes. The two OVAs, which had not been broadcast, were released on a special DVD on December 23, 2005. The English adaptation is licensed by Media Blasters, who released all 26 episodes on 6 DVD compilations between September 2005 and July 2006, to Region 1.

Each episode uses two pieces of theme music, one opening theme and one of two closing themes. "Open Your Mind" (〜小さな羽根ひろげて〜, Chiisana Hane Hirogete) by Yoko Ishida was used as the opening theme for every episode. One through twelve and the finale, episode 24, ended with "Negai" (願, lit. Wish), also by Yoko Ishida; episodes 13–23 and 25–26 closed with "Wing", by Yoko Takahashi;.

No.	Title	Animation Director	Screenwriter	Original release date	Refs
1	"Ah! You're a Goddess?"; Transliteration: "Aa! Kimi wa Megami-sama?" (Japanese: ああっキミは女神さまっ?)	Hiroaki Gōda	Hiroaki Gōda	January 6, 2005	
2	"Ah! Those Who Believe Shall Find Salvation?"; Transliteration: "Aa! Shinjiru Mono wa Tsuwareru?" (Japanese: ああっ信じる者は救われるっ?)	Hiroshi Ōshita	Yoh Watanabe	January 13, 2005	
3	"Ah! Apprenticeship, Home, and the Goddess!"; Transliteration: "Aa! Shugyō to Wagaya to Megami-sama!" (Japanese: ああっ修行と我が家と女神さまっ)	Nonaka Takuya	Yoh Watanabe	January 20, 2005	
4	"Ah! The Queen and the Goddess!"; Transliteration: "Aa! Joō-sama to Megami-sama!" (Japanese: ああっ女王さまと女神さまっ)	Ryuichi Kimura	Jukki Hanada	January 27, 2005	
5	"Ah! Living Under One Roof Together!"; Transliteration: "Aa! Hitotsu Yane no Shita de!" (Japanese: ああっひとつ屋根の下でっ)	Yoshiyuki Asai	Chabō Higurashi	February 3, 2005	
6	"Ah! A Blessing in Every Bargain?"; Transliteration: "Aa! Horidashimono ni Megumi Ari?" (Japanese: ああっ掘り出しものに恵アリっ?)	Hirotaka Endō	Yoh Watanabe	February 10, 2005	
7	"Ah! Where to Confess One's Love!"; Transliteration: "Aa! Omoi Tsutaeru Bashō!" (Japanese: ああっ想い伝える場所っ)	Teragijin Hitoaki	Jukki Hanada	February 17, 2005	
8	"Ah! Can You Pass the Love Test With Those Low Scores!"; Transliteration: "Aa! Hensachi Sanjū kara no Ren'ai Juken!" (Japanese: ああっ偏差値30からの恋愛受験っ)	Mio Takatori	Chabō Higurashi	February 24, 2005	
9	"Ah! The Queen and the Goddess's Secret!"; Transliteration: "Aa! Joō-sama to Megami no Himitsu!" (Japanese: ああっ女王さまと女神のヒミツっ)	Yoshihiko Iwata	Yoh Watanabe	March 3, 2005	
10	"Ah! Can the Auto Club Triumph?"; Transliteration: "Aa! Jidōshabu wa Katemasu ka?" (Japanese: ああっ自動車部は勝てますかっ?)	Teragijin Hitoaki	Jukki Hanada	March 10, 2005	
11	"Ah! A Demon has Come and is Creating Calamity!"; Transliteration: "Aa! Akuma ga Kitarite Wazawai o Nasu!" (Japanese: ああっ悪魔が来たりて災いを成すっ)	Yoshiyuki Asai	Chabō Higurashi	March 17, 2005	
12	"Ah! Compare and Contrast Goddesses and Queens?"; Transliteration: "Aa! Megami to Joō o Tenbin ni Kakete?" (Japanese: ああっ女神と女王を天秤にかけてっ?)	Yoshihiko Iwata	Yoh Watanabe	March 24, 2005	
12.5	Transliteration: "Aa! Megami to Kōkan Nikki?" (Japanese: ああっ女神と交換日記っ?)	Hiroaki Gōda	Yoh Watanabe	March 31, 2005	^{[A]}
13	"Ah! Who Does Big Sister Belong To?"; Transliteration: "Aa! Onee-sama wa Dare no Mono?" (Japanese: ああっお姉さまっは誰のモノっ?)	Hirotaka Endō	Jukki Hanada	April 7, 2005	
14	"Ah! Teaching a Lesson Called Competition!"; Transliteration: "Aa! Taiketsu to Iu Na no Kyōiku Jisshū!" (Japanese: ああっ対決という名の教育実習っ?)	Teragijin Hirotaka	Aoshima Takashi	April 14, 2005	
15	"Ah! My Heart Was Stolen By a Goddess!"; Transliteration: "Aa! Megumi ni Kokoro Ubawarete!" (Japanese: ああっ女神に心奪われてっ)	Ryuichi Kimura	Chabō Higurashi	April 21, 2005	
16	"Ah! Catastrophe Arrives. An Auspicious Sign Stands?"; Transliteration: "Aa! Wazawai Kitarite Chabashira Tatsu?" (Japanese: ああっ災い来たりて茶柱立つっ?)	Yoshiyuki Asai	Aoshima Takashi	April 28, 2005	
17	"Ah! What Are Ability and Effort?"; Transliteration: "Aa! Sainō to Doryoku tte, Nan Desu ka?" (Japanese: ああっ才能と努力って何ですかっ?)	Hiroaki Tomita	Jukki Hanada	May 5, 2005	
18	"Ah! Confess Your Feelings Under the Moon?"; Transliteration: "Aa! Unmei no Kokuhaku wa Tsuki no Shita de?" (Japanese: ああっ運命の告白は月の下でっ?)	Hirotaka Endō	Yoh Watanabe	May 12, 2005	
19	"Ah! Don't Look At Me Like That?"; Transliteration: "Aa! Sonna Hitomi de Mitsumenaide?" (Japanese: ああっそんな瞳でみつめないでっ?)	Teragijin Hirotaka	Chabō Higurashi	May 19, 2005	
20	"Ah! Save the Goddess, If You're a Man!?"; Transliteration: "Aa! Megami o Sukue! Otoko Nara!?" (Japanese: ああっ女神を救えっオトコならっ?)	Yoshihiko Iwata	Jukki Hanada	May 26, 2005	
21	"Ah! The One I Yearn For Is A White-Winged Angel!"; Transliteration: "Aa! Akogare wa Shiroi Tsubasa no Tenshi!" (Japanese: ああっ憧れは白い翼の天使っ)	Akira Katō	Aoshima Takashi	June 2, 2005	
22	"Ah! A Devil's Whisper, Along With a Pot?"; Transliteration: "Aa! Akuma no Sasayaki wa Tsubo to Tomo ni?" (Japanese: ああっ悪魔のささやきは壺と共にっ?)	Yoshiyuki Asai	Chabō Higurashi	June 16, 2005	
23	"Ah! The Savior, Together With the Sound of a Flute?"; Transliteration: "Aa! Kyūseishu wa Fue no Oto to Tomo Ni?" (Japanese: ああっ救世主は笛の音と共にっ?)	Hirotaka Endō	Yoh Watanabe	June 23, 2005	
24	"Ah! Always With You?"; Transliteration: "Aa! Itsumo Kimi to Tomo ni?" (Japanese: ああっいつもキミと共にっ?)	Hiroaki Gōda; Itsuki Imazaki; Teragijin Hitoaki	Yoh Watanabe	July 7, 2005	
25	"Ah! Urd's Small Love Story?"; Transliteration: "Aa? Urudo no Chiisana Koi Monogatari?" (Japanese: ああっウルドの小さな恋物語っ)	Ei Aoki	Aoshima Takashi	December 23, 2005 (OVA)	
26	"Ah! Being an Adult is Heart-Throbbing?"; Transliteration: "Aa! Doki Doki wa Otona no Aji?" (Japanese: ああっドキドキは大人の味っ?)	Takafumi Hoshikawa	Jukki Hanada	December 23, 2005 (OVA)	

=== Ah! My Goddess: Flights of Fancy ===
The episodes of the Japanese anime television series Ah! My Goddess: Everyone Has Wings, officially named Ah! My Goddess: Flights of Fancy in North America, are directed by Hiroaki Gōda, animated by Anime International Company, and produced by TBS and Kodansha. Like its predecessor, the anime does not follow the manga chronologically. The plot follows the adventures of Keiichi and Belldandy in the aftermath of the Lord of Terror fiasco.

It premiered on TBS on April 6, 2006, and concluded on September 14, 2006, continuing the storyline from season one. Season two concluded with episode 22, although the Japanese and North American DVD releases include episodes 23 and 24. It was released to DVD in Japan between July 2006 and February 2007 by Bandai Visual. Media Blasters, who released the first season, declined to produce this season; it was licensed to ADV Films instead. ADV Films released the season on six DVD compilations, each containing four episodes, between May and March 2007. The rights were then transferred to Funimation, who released a boxed set on November 25, 2007.

The episodes featured three pieces of theme music: one opening theme and two closing themes. "Color of Happiness" (幸せのいろ, Shiawase no Iro) by Yoko Ishida served as the opening theme song. For episodes 1–11, "Our Miracle" (僕らのキセキ, Bokura no Kiseki), also by Yoko Ishida, served as the ending, and episodes 12–24 ended with "Koibito Doshi" (恋人同士, lit. "Lovers") by Jyukai.

No. overall	No. in season	Title	Original release date
27	1	"Ah! I Wish...Once More!"; Transliteration: "Aa! Negai yo, Mō Ichido!" (Japanese: ああっ願いよ もう一度っ)	April 6, 2006
28	2	"Ah! The Beleaguered Queen of Vengeance!"; Transliteration: "Aa! Nayameru Fukushū no Joō-sama?" (Japanese: ああっ悩める復讐の女王さまっ)	April 13, 2006
29	3	"Ah! I Offer These Feelings on Christmas Eve!"; Transliteration: "Aa! Seiya ni Sasageru Kono Omoi!" (Japanese: ああっ聖夜に捧げるこの想いっ!)	April 20, 2006
30	4	"Ah! I Want To Fill The World With Happiness!"; Transliteration: "Aa! Sekai o Sachi de Mitashitai?" (Japanese: ああっ世界を幸で満たしたいっ)	April 27, 2006
31	5	"Ah! Well-Matched Vibes of Love!"; Transliteration: "Aa! Hikare Au Koi no Hachō?" (Japanese: ああっ惹かれあう恋の波長っ)	May 4, 2006
32	6	"Ah! Is That Jealousy?!"; Transliteration: "Aa! Sorette Shitto!?" (Japanese: ああっそれって嫉妬っ!?)	May 11, 2006
33	7	"Ah! I Shall Grant Your Wish!"; Transliteration: "Aa! Anata no Nozomi Kanaemasuwa!" (Japanese: ああっ貴方の望み叶えますわっ)	May 18, 2006
34	8	"Ah! I Want to Be of Use to You!"; Transliteration: "Aa! Anata no Yaku ni Tachitakute!" (Japanese: ああっあなたの役に立ちたくてっ)	May 25, 2006
35	9	"Ah! The Goddesses Go Head to Head on a Date!"; Transliteration: "Aa! Megami wa Dēto de Shōbu!" (Japanese: ああっ女神はデートで勝負っ)	June 1, 2006
36	10	"Ah! I Just Can't Say It!"; Transliteration: "Aa! Sono Hitokoto ga Ienakute!" (Japanese: ああっそのひとことが言えなくてっ)	June 8, 2006
37	11	"Ah! Grasp Your Dream With Your Own Hands!"; Transliteration: "Aa! Sono Te de Yume o Tsukamaete!" (Japanese: ああっその手で夢をつかまえてっ)	June 15, 2006
38	12	"Ah! A Goddess's Tears and His Dream!"; Transliteration: "Aa! Megami no Namida to Kare no Yume!" (Japanese: ああっ女神の涙と彼の夢っ)	June 22, 2006
39	13	"Ah! Let Those Feelings Awaken!"; Transliteration: "Aa! Mezamete?! Sono Kimochi!" (Japanese: ああっ目覚めてっ!その気持ちっ)	June 29, 2006
40	14	"Ah! My Darling Cupid!"; Transliteration: "Aa! Itoshiki Watashi no Kyūpitto?" (Japanese: ああっ愛しき私のキューピットっ)	July 6, 2006
41	15	"Ah! I'm Half Goddess, Half Demon?!"; Transliteration: "Aa! Megami to Akuma no Watashi?" (Japanese: ああっ女神と悪魔の私っ?)	July 13, 2006
42	16	"Ah! Shimmer Without Fear of the Darkness!"; Transliteration: "Aa! Yami o Osorezu Kagayaite?" (Japanese: ああっ闇を恐れず輝いてっ)	July 20, 2006
43	17	"Ah! The Chair of Demonkind Descends!"; Transliteration: "Aa! Daimakaichō-sama Kōrin?" (Japanese: ああっ大魔界長さまっ降臨っ)	July 27, 2006
44	18	"Ah! Do Demons Have Any Dignity?!"; Transliteration: "Aa! Mazoku no Ishin wa Arimasu ka?" (Japanese: ああっ魔属の威信はありますかっ?)	August 3, 2006
45	19	"Ah! The Love of a Goddess Saves the Ninja!"; Transliteration: "Aa! Megami no Ai wa Shinobi o sukuu!" (Japanese: ああっ女神の愛はシノビを救うっ)	August 10, 2006
46	20	"Ah! It Doesn't Matter Where, So Long as We're Together!"; Transliteration: "Aa! Donna Bashō de mo Futari Nara!" (Japanese: ああっどんな場所でも二人ならっ)	August 31, 2006
47	21	"Ah! Would It Be Okay If I Were a Demon?!"; Transliteration: "Aa! Watashi ga Mazoku demo Ii Desu ka?" (Japanese: ああっ私が魔属でもいいですかっ?)	September 7, 2006
48	22	"Ah! The Goddess's Confession!"; Transliteration: "Aa! Megami no Kokuhaku?" (Japanese: ああっ女神の告白っ)	September 14, 2006
49	23	"Ah! Everyone Has a Destiny!"; Transliteration: "Aa! Sorezore no Unmei" (Japanese: ああっそれぞれの運命っ)	February 23, 2007 (OVA)
50	24	"Ah! The Song of Love That Shakes the Heart!"; Transliteration: "Aa! Suki wa Kokoro o Yusaburu Uta" (Japanese: ああっ好きは心を揺さぶる歌っ)	February 23, 2007 (OVA)

=== Ah! My Goddess: Fighting Wings ===
Ah! My Goddess: Fighting Wings by Aya Yanagi is a two-episode special that commemorates the 20th anniversary of the original publication of Oh My Goddess!. It was directed by Hiroaki Gōda, animated by Anime International Company, and produced by TBS and Kodansha. The episodes aired on December 8, 2007. Bandai Visual released the episodes to a single DVD in Japan on February 22, 2008. The episodes, however, have yet to be licensed and released to Region 1.

Both the opening theme, "Ai no Hoshi" (愛の星; "Star of Love"), and the closing theme, "Hanamuke no Melody" (ハナムケのメロディー, Hanamuke no Merodī; "Farewell Gift Melody"), are played by Jyukai.

#	Title	Original airdate
1	"Ah! The One-Winged Angel Descends!"; Transliteration: "Aa! Katayoku no Tenshi Kōrin!" (Japanese: ああっ片翼の天使降臨っ)	December 9, 2007
A dark force causes several angels to collapse. Lind attacks it, resulting in an explosion. On Earth, Belldandy, Peorth, and Urd have a tea party with their angels. Lind, the legendary Valkyrie, arrives and declares a state of emergency. The Angel Eater has escaped, forcing Lind to investigate the temple thoroughly. Urd and Peorth are both attacked and incapacitated when they lose their angels. Lind, reminiscing about her past failures and her warlike nature, is comforted by Belldandy. Belldandy agrees to act as a lure for the Angel Eater while Lind stands guard, but once Lind loses consciousness and Belldandy is attacked, Lind realizes that the Angel Eater is within herself. Hild appears and reveals her plan to force devils into goddesses by consuming their angels and replacing them, turning them into demonesses.
2	"Ah! Two of Us, Together in Joy!"; Transliteration: "Aa! Yorokobi o Futari de Tomo ni!" (Japanese: ああっ悦びを二人で共にっ)	December 9, 2007
Lind rushes outside to save Keiichi and Skuld but discovers that they have easily captured Marller. The Angel Eater's attack, however, forces Lind, Skuld, and Keiichi to retreat. They devise a plan to defeat Hild, despite Skuld's protests. Hild interrupts them and attacks, forcing Skuld to summon her angel. However, the Angel Eater draws Skuld's angel toward her, and Keiichi summons one of Lind's angels to catch Hild in a trap. Hild reveals Belldandy, who has been converted into a demoness and now holds a devil. Lind, Skuld, and Keiichi can defend themselves against Belldandy, but Belldandy converts the devil into an angel. Lind, inspired by Keiichi, starts to duel against Hild, but Hild loses control of the Angel Eater, so Hild and Marller run away. As Lind begins to lose faith in her own ability to defeat the Angel Eater, Belldandy inspires her to continue. With Belldandy's urging and support, Lind summons both of her angels at once and easily defeats the Angel Eater. After rebuilding the destroyed temple and exchanging parting words, Lind returns to Heaven.

== Note ==
A. Episode 12.5 was not included in the English DVD releases and consequently has no official U.S. title. In addition, the episode is not officially numbered but was aired between episodes 12 and 13.
