= List of Oh My Goddess! soundtracks =

Below is a list of soundtracks (OSTs) from the anime series derived from the Oh My Goddess! (ああっ女神さまっ, Aa! Megami-sama!) manga.

== Oh My Goddess! (manga) ==
=== Image Album – Music and Short Story ===
English:	Image Album – Music and Short Story	Kanji:	ああっ女神さまっ コミック・イメージ・ソング MUSIC AND SHORT STORY	Romaji:	Aa! Megami-sama! Komikku Imeeji Songu – Music and Short Story
Artist:		Play Time:	47:52	Manufacturer:	Pony Canyon
Catalog #:	MECH-30005 (Regular Edition); MECH-30005F (First Press Edition)	# of Discs:	1	Printing Date:	1991-03-13

#	English Title	Japanese Title		Time
#	English Title	Kanji	Romaji	Time
1.	Coming Out of a Mirror (Kappei Yamaguchi)	鏡をぬけて	Kagamiwo Nukete	4:02
2.	Drama Part 1	ドラマ・一分	Dorama Ichibun	0:16
3.	Our Campus Idol Is a Goddess (Seikou Nagaoka)	キャンパス・アイドルは女神さま	Kyanpasu · Aidoruwa Megami-sama	4:39
4.	Drama Part 2	ドラマ・二分	Dorama Nibun	3:24
5.	The Dashing Motor Club	突っ走る自動車部	Tsuppashiru Jidoushabu	3:15
6.	Drama Part 3	ドラマ・三分	Dorama Sanbun	0:49
7.	Leave It to Me (Naoko Matsui)	ま~っかせなさ~いっっっ	Ma~kasenasa~i!!!	3:52
8.	Drama Part 4	ドラマ・四分	Dorama Yonbun	2:16
9.	Where Is the Lucky Star? (Seikou Nagaoka)	ラッキー・スターはどこに?	Rakkii · Sutaa wa Dokoni?	4:26
10.	Drama Part 5	ドラマ・五分	Dorama Gobun	1:31
11.	Spirits! (Seikou Nagaoka)	精霊たちよ	Seirei-tachiyo	3:11
12.	Drama Part 6	ドラマ・六分	Dorama Rokubun	0:39
13.	A Town with Goddess (Seikou Nagaoka)	女神さまのいる町	Megami-sama no Iru Machi	5:09
14.	Drama Part 7	ドラマ・七分	Dorama Nanabun	0:19
15.	I Shall Be Here Forever (Noriko Hidaka)	いつまでも ここにいます	Itsumademo Kokoni Imasu	3:59
16.	Drama Part 8	ドラマ・八分	Dorama Hachibun	1:00
17.	Ah! My Goddess (Noriko Hidaka, Naoko Matsui, Chisa Yokoyama)	アー!マイ・ゴッドネス	Aa! Mai Goddonesu!	5:05

== Goddess Family Club ==
=== A Goddess's Feelings (Megami no Kimochi) ===
English:	A Goddess's Feelings	Kanji:	女神の気持ち	Romaji:	Megami no Kimochi
Artist:	Kikuko Inoue	Play Time:	20:33	Manufacturer:	Pony Canyon
Catalog #:	PCDG-00042-1	# of Discs:	1	Printing Date:	1992-06-19

#	English Title	Japanese Title		Time
#	English Title	Kanji	Romaji	Time
1.	A Goddess's Feelings	女神の気持ち	Megami no Kimochi	5:38
2.	Affection	愛情	Aijou	4:38
3.	A Goddess's Feelings (Instrumental) (Takeshi Yasuda)	女神の気持ち (インストゥルメンタル)	Megami no Kimochi (Instrumental)	5:38
4.	Affection (Instrumental) (Takeshi Yasuda)	愛情 (インストゥルメンタル)	Aijou (Instrumental)	4:39

=== Call Me Goddess! (Megami-sama to Oyobi!) ===
English:	Call Me Goddess!	Kanji:	女神さまっと	Romaji:	Megami-sama to Oyobi!
Artist:	Yumi Touma	Play Time:	15:52	Manufacturer:	Pony Canyon
Catalog #:	PCDG-00042-2	# of Discs:	1	Printing Date:	1992-06-19

#	English Title	Japanese Title		Time
#	English Title	Kanji	Romaji	Time
1.	Call Me Goddess!	女神さまっとお呼び!	Megami-sama to Oyobi!	4:03
2.	Summoning a Starry Sky	星空召喚	Hoshizora Shoukan	3:55
3.	Call Me Goddess! (Instrumental) (Takeshi Yasuda)	女神さまっとお呼び! (インストゥルメンタル)	Megami-sama to Oyobi! (Instrumental)	4:02
4.	Summoning a Starry Sky (Instrumental) (Takeshi Yasuda)	星空召喚 (インストゥルメンタル)	Hoshizora Shoukan (Instrumental)	3:52

=== The Law of Love (Koi no Housoku) ===
English:	The Law of Love	Kanji:	恋の法則	Romaji:	Koi no Housoku
Artist:	Aya Hisakawa	Play Time:	16:55	Manufacturer:	Pony Canyon
Catalog #:	PCDG-00042-3	# of Discs:	1	Printing Date:	1992-06-19

#	English Title	Japanese Title		Time
#	English Title	Kanji	Romaji	Time
1.	The Law of Love	恋の法則	Koi no Housoku	4:32
2.	Don't Treat Me Like a Child	子供扱いしないでよ	Kodomo Atsukai Shinaideyo	3:57
3.	The Law of Love (Instrumental) (Takeshi Yasuda)	恋の法則 (インストゥルメンタル)	Koi no Housoku (Instrumental)	4:32
4.	Don't Treat Me Like a Child (Instrumental) (Takeshi Yasuda)	子供扱いしないでよ (インストゥルメンタル)	Kodomo Atsukai Shinaideyo (Instrumental)	3:54

=== 20-second Commercial Collection (20 Byou CM Gouka 10 Hontate) ===
English:	20-second Commercial Collection	Kanji:	20秒CM豪華10本立て	Romaji:	20 Byou CM Gouka 10 Hontate
Artist:		Play Time:	3:31	Manufacturer:	Pony Canyon
Catalog #:	PCDG-00042-4	# of Discs:	1	Printing Date:	1992-06-19

#	English Title	Japanese Title		Time
#	English Title	Kanji	Romaji	Time
1.		紅談茶	Koudancha	0:21
2.		元気もりもり君アイス	Genki Morimori-kun Ice	0:22
3.		コースー化粧品・夏の新色	Kousuu Keshouhin: Natsu no Shinshoku	0:21
4.		フジシマの編み棒	Fujishima no Amibou	0:21
5.		猫実予備校	Nekomi Yobikou	0:20
6.	Kodansha "Afternoon"	講談社 「アフタヌーン」	Kodansha "Afternoon"	0:21
7.	Belldandy "A Goddess's Feelings" (Kikuko Inoue)	ベルダンディー 「女神の気持ち」	Berudandii "Megami no Kimochi"	0:21
8.	Skuld "The Law of Love" (Aya Hisakawa)	スクルド 「恋の法則」	Sukurudo "Koi no Housoku"	0:20
9.	Urd "Call Me Goddess!" (Yumi Touma)	ウルド 「女神さまっとお呼び!」	Urudo "Megami-sama to Oyobi!"	0:21
10.	Mikami Debut Pack (Goddess Family Club)	三神デビュー・パック	Mikami Debyuu Pakku	0:23

=== A Goddess Sings (Megami ha Utau) ===
English:	A Goddess Sings	Kanji:	女神はうたう	Romaji:	Megami ha Utau
Artist:	Kikuko Inoue	Play Time:	18:01	Manufacturer:	Pony Canyon
Catalog #:	PCDG-00049-1	# of Discs:	1	Printing Date:	1992-09-18

#	English Title	Japanese Title		Time
#	English Title	Kanji	Romaji	Time
1.	A Goddess Sings	女神はうたう	Megami ha Utau	4:30
2.	To Live with Me Is Your Happiness	僕と生きることが君のしあわせ	Boku to Ikiru Koto ga Kimi no Shiawase	4:32
3.	A Goddess Sings (Instrumental) (Takeshi Yasuda)	女神はうたう (インストゥルメンタル)	Megami ha Utau (Instrumental)	4:30
4.	To Live with Me Is Your Happiness (Instrumental) (Takeshi Yasuda)	僕と生きることが君のしあわせ (インストゥルメンタル)	Boku to Ikiru Koto ga Kimi no Shiawase (Instrumental)	4:29

=== I Can't Leave Him Alone (Hottokenai no Sa) ===
English:	I Can't Leave Him Alone	Kanji:	放っとけないのさ	Romaji:	Hottokenai no Sa
Artist:	Yumi Touma	Play Time:	18:19	Manufacturer:	Pony Canyon
Catalog #:	PCDG-00049-2	# of Discs:	1	Printing Date:	1992-09-18

#	English Title	Japanese Title		Time
#	English Title	Kanji	Romaji	Time
1.	I Can't Leave Him Alone	放っとけないのさ	Hottokenai no Sa	4:28
2.	A Girl Waiting for a Shooting Star	流れ星を待つ少女	Nagareboshi wo Matsu Shoujo	4:43
3.	I Can't Leave Him Alone (Instrumental) (Takeshi Yasuda)	放っとけないのさ (インストゥルメンタル)	Hottokenai no Sa (Instrumental)	4:28
4.	A Girl Waiting for a Shooting Star (Instrumental) (Takeshi Yasuda)	流れ星を待つ少女 (インストゥルメンタル)	Nagareboshi wo Matsu Shoujo (Instrumental)	4:40

=== You Can't Catch Me (Tsukamara nai Yo) ===
English:	You Can't Catch Me	Kanji:	捕まらないよ	Romaji:	Tsukamara nai Yo
Artist:	Aya Hisakawa	Play Time:	16:47	Manufacturer:	Pony Canyon
Catalog #:	PCDG-00049-3	# of Discs:	1	Printing Date:	1992-09-18

#	English Title	Japanese Title		Time
#	English Title	Kanji	Romaji	Time
1.	You Can't Catch Me	捕まらないよ	Tsukamara nai Yo	4:10
2.	Greetings with a Waltz	ワルツであいさつ	Warutsu de Aisatsu	4:15
3.	You Can't Catch Me (Instrumental) (Takeshi Yasuda)	捕まらないよ (インストゥルメンタル)	Tsukamara nai Yo (Instrumental)	4:10
4.	Greetings with a Waltz (Instrumental) (Takeshi Yasuda)	ワルツであいさつ (インストゥルメンタル)	Warutsu de Aisatsu (Instrumental)	4:12

=== I Can't Leave Him Alone (Hottokenai no Sa) – Claim Taishougaihen Version ===
English:	I Can't Leave Him Alone	Kanji:	放っとけないのさ	Romaji:	Hottokenai no Sa
Artist:	Goddess Family Club, Masami Kikuchi, Kōsuke Fujishima, Yoshida Jaamae	Play Time:	4:56	Manufacturer:	Pony Canyon
Catalog #:	PCDG-00049-4	# of Discs:	1	Printing Date:	1992-09-18

#	English Title	Japanese Title		Time
#	English Title	Kanji	Romaji	Time
1.	I Can't Leave Him Alone	放っとけないのさ	Hottokenai no Sa	4:56

=== Happiness Accelerates (Shiawase ga Kasoku Suru) – Live Version ===
English:	Happiness Accelerates	Kanji:	しあわせが加速する	Romaji:	Shiawase ga Kasoku Suru
Artist:	Goddess Family Club	Play Time:	10:03	Manufacturer:	Pony Canyon
Catalog #:	PCDG-00050	# of Discs:	1	Printing Date:	1992-11-20

#	English Title	Japanese Title		Time
#	English Title	Kanji	Romaji	Time
1.	Happiness Accelerates (Live)	しあわせが加速する (ライヴ・ヴァージョン)	Shiawase ga Kasoku Suru (Raivu vājon)	4:27
2.	A Message from God (Live)	神さまっの伝言 (ライヴ・ヴァージョン)	Kami-sama no Dengon (Raivu vājon)	5:36

=== Ah! My Goddess!☆Singles (Aa! Megami-sama!☆Singles) ===
English:	Ah! My Goddess!☆Singles	Kanji:	ああっ 女神さまっ☆Singles	Romaji:	Aa! Megami-sama!☆Singles
Artist:	Goddess Family Club	Play Time:	62:37	Manufacturer:	Pony Canyon
Catalog #:	PCCG-00201	# of Discs:	1	Printing Date:	1992-11-20

#	English Title	Japanese Title		Time
#	English Title	Kanji	Romaji	Time
1.	Happiness Accelerates (Goddess Family Club)	しあわせが加速する	Shiawase ga Kasoku Suru	4:20
2.	A Goddess Sings (Kikuko Inoue)	女神はうたう	Megami ha Utau	4:29
3.	Call Me Goddess! (Yumi Touma)	女神さまっとお呼び!	Megami-sama to Oyobi!	4:03
4.	Don't Treat Me Like a Child (Aya Hisakawa)	子供扱いしないでよ	Kodomo-atsukai Shinaide Yo	3:56
5.	A Girl Waiting for a Shooting Star (Yumi Touma)	流れ星を待つ少女	Nagareboshi wo Matsu Shoujo	4:42
6.	Affection (Kikuko Inoue)	愛情	Aijou	4:40
7.	You Can't Catch Me (Aya Hisakawa)	捕まらないよ	Tsukamara nai Yo	4:10
8.	I Can't Leave Him Alone (Yumi Touma)	放っとけないのさ	Hottokenai no Sa	4:28
9.	A Goddess's Feelings (Kikuko Inoue)	女神の気持ち	Megami no Kimochi	5:41
10.	Greetings with a Waltz (Aya Hisakawa)	ワルツであいさつ	Warutsu de Aisatsu	4:14
11.	Summoning a Starry Sky (Yumi Touma)	星空召喚	Hoshizora Shoukan	3:54
12.	The Law of Love (Aya Hisakawa)	恋の法則	Koi no Housoku	4:43
13.	To Live with Me Is Your Happiness (Kikuko Inoue)	僕と生きることが君のしあわせ	Boku to Ikiru Koto ga Kimi no Shiawase	4:31
14.	A Message from God (Goddess Family Club)	神さまの伝言	Kami-sama no Dengon	4:46

=== King of Extra Gifts (Tokuten-ou) ===
English:	King of Extra Gifts	Kanji:	ああっ女神さまっ 特典王	Romaji:	Tokuten-ou
Artist:		Play Time:	59:48	Manufacturer:	Pony Canyon
Catalog #:	PCCG-00225	# of Discs:	1	Printing Date:	1993-06-20

#	English Title	Japanese Title		Time
#	English Title	Kanji	Romaji	Time
1.	The Poor's Dance, Narration	貧乏の踊りサービス	Binbou no Odori Saabisu	1:35
2.	High Quality Song (Junko Asami)	ハイ・クオリティ・ソング	Hai Kuoriti Songu	3:57
3.	The Man and Goddess's Love Song (Masami Kikuchi, Kikuko Inoue)	男と女神のラヴ・ソング	Otoko to Megami no Ravu Songu	4:28
4.	Oh Urd! 1	おおっウルド1	Oo! Urudo 1	0:29
5.	You're Not an Elementary School Student Any More, Right? (Yuriko Fuchizaki)	小学生じゃないんだから	Shougakusei ja Nainda Kara	5:00
6.	Greeting by Goddess Folk-song Club	GFsCあいさつ	Goddess Folk-song Club Aisatsu	1:05
7.	Unlucky Day (Goddess Folk-song Club)	仏滅	Butsumetsu	4:08
8.	Woman of Nekomi (Urara Takano)	猫実の女	Nekomi no Hito	4:20
9.	Oh Urd! 2	おおっウルド2	Oo! Urudo 2	0:35
10.	Fight! Banpei-kun RX (Goddess Funky-monkey Club)	闘えっ!ばんぺいくんRX	Tatakae! Banpei-kun RX	4:07
11.	The Four-Wheel Club Is Now Welcoming Newcomers	4輪部入会受け付け中	Yonrinbu Nyuukai Uketsuke Chuu	1:34
12.	The Song of the Motor Club (Nekomi Institute of Technology Motor Club)	正調・自動車部々歌	Seichou – Jidoushabu Buka	3:54
13.	Devil's CD Notice	「悪魔のCD」告知	"Akuma no CD" Kokuchi	0:28
14.	Don't Use My Name without Permission (Chieko Honda)	勝手に名前を使わないでね	Katte ni Namae wo Tsukawanaide Ne	3:01
15.	Like I Said, It's Not Me	だから私じゃないんです	Dakara watashi ja Nain Desu	0:27
16.	Let's Play with the Composer Mecha (Aya Hisakawa)	作曲くんメカと遊ぼう	Sakkyoku-kun Meka to Asobou	5:45
17.	Rescue This Rude Disc!	無礼な音盤を救え!	Burei na Onban o Sukue!	1:37
18.	As If the Earth Would Smile (Goddess Family Club)	地球が微笑むように	Chikyuu ga Hohoemu you Ni	6:02
19.	I Can't Leave Him Alone – Everyone Together!	放っとけないのさ全員集合!	Hottokenai No Sa Zen'in Shuugou!	7:16

=== God's Present (Kami-sama no Okurimono) ===
English:	God's Present	Kanji:	神さまの贈りもの	Romaji:	Kami-sama no Okurimono
Artist:	Goddess Family Club	Play Time:	47:39	Manufacturer:	Pony Canyon
Catalog #:	PCCG-00246	# of Discs:	1	Printing Date:	1993-11-21

#	English Title	Japanese Title		Time
#	English Title	Kanji	Romaji	Time
1.	Even Though My Unrequited Love Is Still Unknown (Goddess Family Club)	片思いしか知らないくせに	Kataomoi Shika Shiranai Kuseni	4:59
2.	Ribbon (Kikuko Inoue)	N/A	N/A	4:43
3.	Back-to-back, Hearts Racing (Yumi Touma)	背中あわせのときめき	Senaka Awase no Tokimeki	5:23
4.	The Gloves Hidden in My Pockets (Kikuko Inoue)	ポケットに隠した手ぶくろ	Poketto ni Kakushita Tebukuro	4:28
5.	Cookie's Story (Aya Hisakawa)	N/A	N/A	4:38
6.	Music Box That Plays a Sadly-colored Melody (Goddess Family Club)	悲しい音色のオルゴール	Kanashii Neiro no Orugooru	5:16
7.	White Fairy (Yumi Touma)	白い妖精	Shiroi Yousei	4:29
8.	Let's Fall in Love Again (Aya Hisakawa)	また恋をしようよ	Mata Koi wo Shiyouyo	4:46
9.	God's Present (Goddess Family Club)	神さまの贈りもの	Kami-sama no Okurimono	8:57

=== Your Birthday (Anata no Birthday) ===
English:	Your Birthday	Kanji:	あなたのBirthday	Romaji:	Anata no Birthday
Artist:	Kikuko Inoue	Play Time:	19:28	Manufacturer:	Pony Canyon
Catalog #:	PCDG-00091	# of Discs:	1	Printing Date:	1997-08-07

#	English Title	Japanese Title		Time
#	English Title	Kanji	Romaji	Time
1.	Your Birthday	あなたのBirthday	Anata no Birthday	5:12
2.	Meaningful Tears	なみだの意味	Namida no Imi	4:30
3.	Your Birthday (Instrumental) (Takeshi Yasuda)	あなたのBirthday (インストゥルメンタル)	Anata no Birthday (Instrumental)	5:14
4.	Meaningful Tears (Instrumental) (Takeshi Yasuda)	なみだの意味 (インストゥルメンタル)	Namida no Imi (Instrumental)	4:32

=== Fortune Smiled on You ===
English:	Fortune Smiled on You	Kanji:	N/A	Romaji:	N/A
Artist:	Yumi Touma	Play Time:	18:24	Manufacturer:	Pony Canyon
Catalog #:	PCDG-00092	# of Discs:	1	Printing Date:	1997-08-07

#	English Title	Japanese Title		Time
#	English Title	Kanji	Romaji	Time
1.	Fortune Smiled on You	N/A	N/A	4:21
2.	Memory of Petals	花びらの記憶	Hanabira no Kioku	4:51
3.	Fortune Smiled on You (Instrumental) (Takeshi Yasuda)	N/A	N/A	4:20
4.	Memory of Petals (Instrumental) (Takeshi Yasuda)	花びらの記憶 (インストゥルメンタル)	Hanabira no Kioku (Instrumental)	4:52

=== Bicycle (Jitensha) ===
English:	Bicycle	Kanji:	自転車	Romaji:	Jitensha
Artist:	Aya Hisakawa	Play Time:	17:54	Manufacturer:	Pony Canyon
Catalog #:	PCDG-00093	# of Discs:	1	Printing Date:	1997-08-07

#	English Title	Japanese Title		Time
#	English Title	Kanji	Romaji	Time
1.	Bicycle	自転車	Jitensha	4:41
2.	Rice Balls	おにぎり	Onigiri	4:17
3.	Bicycle (Instrumental) (Takeshi Yasuda)	自転車 (インストゥルメンタル)	Jitensha (Instrumental)	4:40
4.	Rice Balls (Instrumental) (Takeshi Yasuda)	おにぎり (インストゥルメンタル)	Onigiri (Instrumental)	4:16

=== I Can't Change It, I Can't Be Transmitted (Kimi wo Kaerarenai Boku ga Tsutawaranai) ===
English:	I Can't Change It, I Can't Be Transmitted	Kanji:	きみを変えられない、ぼくが伝わらない	Romaji:	Kimi wo Kaerarenai Boku ga Tsutawaranai
Artist:	Goddess Family Club	Play Time:	18:23	Manufacturer:	Pony Canyon
Catalog #:	PCDG-00094	# of Discs:	1	Printing Date:	1997-08-07

#	English Title	Japanese Title		Time
#	English Title	Kanji	Romaji	Time
1.	I Can't Change It, I Can't Be Transmitted	きみを変えられない、ぼくが伝わらない	Kimi wo Kaerarenai Boku ga Tsutawaranai	4:28
2.	Pictures at an Exhibition	展覧会の絵	Tenrankai no E	4:46
3.	I Can't Change It, I Can't Be Transmitted (Instrumental) (Takeshi Yasuda)	きみを変えられない、ぼくが伝わらない (インストゥルメンタル)	Kimi wo Kaerarenai Boku ga Tsutawaranai (Instrumental)	4:28
4.	Pictures at an Exhibition (Instrumental) (Takeshi Yasuda)	展覧会の絵 (インストゥルメンタル)	Tenrankai no E (Instrumental)	4:41

=== God's Karaoke (Kami no Karaoke) ===
English:	God's Karaoke	Kanji:	ああっ女神さまっ 神のカラオケCD	Romaji:	Kami no Karaoke
Artist:		Play Time:	70:58, 73:05, 73:25, 65:25	Manufacturer:	Pony Canyon
Catalog #:	PCCG-00252-1; PCCG-00252-2; PCCG-00252-3; PCCG-00252-4	# of Discs:	4	Printing Date:	1994-03-18

#	English Title	Japanese Title		Time
#	English Title	Kanji	Romaji	Time
Disc 1
1.	Affection	愛情	Aijou	4:44
2.	The Man and Goddess's Love Song (Both Parts)	男と女神のラブ・ソング	Otoko to Megami no Love Song	4:32
3.	The Man and Goddess's Love Song (Sing Keiichi's Part)	男と女神のラブ・ソング	Otoko to Megami no Love Song	4:31
4.	The Man and Goddess's Love Song (Sing Belldandy's Part)	男と女神のラブ・ソング	Otoko to Megami no Love Song	4:31
5.	Even Though My Unrequited Love Is Still Unknown	片思いしか知らないくせに	Kataomoi Shika Shiranai Kuseni	5:02
6.	Don't Abuse My Name without Permission	勝手に名前を使わないでね	Katte ni Namae wo Tsukawanaide Ne	3:04
7.	Music Box That Plays a Sadly-colored Melody	悲しい音色のオルゴール	Kanashii Neiro no Orugooru	5:19
8.	God's Present	神さまの贈りもの	Kami-sama no Okurimono	9:13
9.	A Message from God	神さまの伝言	Kami-sama no Dengon	4:50
10.	A Message from God (Live)	神さまの伝言	Kami-sama no Dengon	5:41
11.	Cookie's Story	N/A	N/A	4:41
12.	The Law of Love	恋の法則	Koi no Housoku	4:46
13.	Don't Treat Me Like a Child	子供扱いしないでよ	Kodomo Atsukai Shinaide Yo	3:59
14.	Congratulations!	N/A	N/A	4:27
15.	Congratulations! (Video & LD size)	N/A	N/A	1:31
Disc 2
1.	Let's Play with the Composer Mecha (Both Parts)	作曲くんメカと遊ぼう	Sakkyoku-kun Mecha to Asobou	5:50
2.	Let's Play with the Composer Mecha (Sing Skuld's Part)	作曲くんメカと遊ぼう	Sakkyoku-kun Mecha to Asobou	5:50
3.	Let's Play with the Composer Mecha (Sing Composer's Part)	作曲くんメカと遊ぼう	Sakkyoku-kun Mecha to Asobou	5:49
4.	Happiness Accelerates	しあわせが加速する	Shiawase ga Kasoku Suru	4:23
5.	Happiness Accelerates (Live)	しあわせが加速する (ライヴ・ヴァージョン)	Shiawase ga Kasoku Suru (Raivu vājon)	4:32
6.	You're Not an Elementary School Student Any More, Right?	小学生じゃないんだから	Shogakusei ja Nain Dakara	5:03
7.	White Fairy	白い妖精	Shiroi Yousei	4:36
8.	The Song of the Motor Club	正調・自動車部々歌	Seichou – Jidoshabu Buka	3:58
9.	Back-to-back, Hearts Racing	背中あわせのときめき	Senaka Awase no Tokimeki	5:27
10.	Fight! Banpei-kun RX	闘えっ!ばんべいくんRX	Tatakae! Banpei-kun RX	4:11
11.	Fight! Banpei-kun RX (Sing Yoshida Jaamane's Part)	闘えっ!ばんべいくんRX	Tatakae! Banpei-kun RX	4:11
12.	Fight! Banpei-kun RX (Sing Kousuke Fujishima's Part)	闘えっ!ばんべいくんRX	Tatakae! Banpei-kun RX	4:10
13.	As If the Earth Would Smile	地球が微笑むように	Chikyuu ga Hohoemu you Ni	6:06
14.	You Can't Catch Me	捕まらないよ	Tsukarama nai Yo	4:13
15.	A Girl Waiting for a Shooting Star	流れ星を待つ少女	Nagareboshi wo Matsu Shoujo	4:40
Disc 3
1.	Woman of Nekomi	猫実の女	Nekomi no Hito	4:24
2.	High Quality Song	N/A	N/A	4:01
3.	Unlucky Day	仏滅	Butsumetsu	4:13
4.	To Live with Me Is Your Happiness	僕と生きることが君のしあわせ	Boku to Ikiru Koto ga Kimi no Shiawase	4:34
5.	The Gloves Hidden in My Pockets	ポケットに隠した手ぶくろ	Pokketto ni Kakushita Tebukuro	4:32
6.	Summoning a Starry Sky	星空召喚	Hoshizora Shoukan	3:57
7.	I Can't Leave Him Alone (Sing Urd's Part)	放っとけないのさ	Hottokenai no Sa	4:31
8.	I Can't Leave Him Alone (Sing Chorus's Part)	放っとけないのさ	Hottokenai no Sa	4:32
9.	I Can't Leave Him Alone – Everyone Together! (Sing Urd's Part)	放っとけないのさ全員集合!	Hottokenai no Sa Zennin Shugo!	4:26
10.	I Can't Confess My Heart, I Wanna Confirm Your Heart	My Heart言い出せない, Your Heart確かめたい	My Heart Iidasenai, Your Heart Tashikametai	4:20
11.	I Can't Confess My Heart, I Wanna Confirm Your Heart (TV Size)	My Heart言い出せない, Your Heart確かめたい	My Heart Iidasenai, Your Heart Tashikametai	1:40
12.	Let's Fall in Love Again	また恋をしようよ	Mata Koi wo Shiyouyo	4:48
13.	Call Me Goddess!	女神さまっとお呼び!	Megami-sama to Oyobi!	4:05
14.	A Goddess's Feelings	女神の気持ち	Megami no Kimochi	5:44
15.	A Goddess Sings	女神はうたう	Megami ha Utau	4:33
16.	Ribbon	N/A	N/A	4:47
17.	Greetings with a Waltz	ワルツであいさつ	Waltz de Aisatsu	4:12
Disc 4
1.	Introduction to CD 1		Kashou Shidou Zadankai, CD 1 "A" kara "KO"	0:09
2.	Goddess Family Club		Goddess Family Club	5:30
3.	Mitsuo Iwata (Gan-chan)		Iwata Mitsuo	1:21
4.	Goddess Family Club		Goddess Family Club	9:35
5.	Introduction to CD 2		Kashou Shidou Zadankai, CD 2 "sa" kara "na"	0:08
6.	Goddess Family Club		Goddess Family Club	0:50
7.	Kousuke Fujishima		Fujishima Kousuke	1:28
8.	Goddess Family Club		Goddess Family Club	0:51
9.	Yoshida Jaamane		Jaamane Yoshida	1:24
10.	Goddess Family Club		Goddess Family Club	5:47
11.	Yuriko Fuchizaki (Megumi)		Fuchizaki Yuriko	1:28
12.	Goddess Family Club		Goddess Family Club	6:33
13.	Introduction to CD 3		Kashou Shidou Zadankai, CD 2 "ne" kara "wa"	0:09
14.	Goddess Family Club		Goddess Family Club	1:05
15.	Urara Takano (Marller)		Takano Urara	1:06
16.	Goddess Family Club		Goddess Family Club	7:12
17.	Junko Asami (Sayoko)		Asami Junko	1:27
18.	Goddess Family Club		Goddess Family Club	6:22
19.	Masami Kikuchi (Keiichi)		Kikuchi Masami	1:02
20.	Goddess Family Club		Goddess Family Club	11:50

=== God's Present Plus (Kami-sama no Okurimono Plus) ===
English:	God's Present Plus	Kanji:	ああっ女神さまっ 神様のおくりもの+(プラス)	Romaji:	Kami-sama no Okurimono
Artist:		Play Time:	47:36, 43:39	Manufacturer:	Pony Canyon
Catalog #:	PCCG-00561-1; PCCG-00561-2	# of Discs:	2	Printing Date:	2000-12-20

#	English Title	Japanese Title		Time
#	English Title	Kanji	Romaji	Time
Disc 1
1.	Even Though My Unrequited Love Is Still Unknown	片思いしか知らないくせに	Kataomoi Shika Shiranai Kuseni	4:59
2.	Ribbon	N/A	N/A	4:43
3.	Back-to-back, Hearts Racing	背中あわせのときめき	Senaka Awase no Tokimeki	5:23
4.	The Gloves Hidden in My Pockets	ポケットに隠した手ぶくろ	Pokketto ni Kakushita Tebukuro	4:28
5.	Cookie's Story	N/A	N/A	4:37
6.	Music Box That Plays a Sadly-colored Melody	悲しい音色のオルゴール	Kanashii Neiro no Orugooru	5:15
7.	White Fairy	白い妖精	Shiroi Yousei	4:29
8.	Let's Fall in Love Again	また恋をしようよ	Mata Koi wo Shiyouyo	4:45
9.	God's Present	神さまの贈りもの	Kami-sama no Okurimono	8:57
Disc 2
1.	Prologue (Instrumental)	N/A	N/A	2:23
2.	Music Box That Plays a Sadly-colored Melody	悲しい音色のオルゴール	Kanashii Neiro no Orugooru	5:13
3.	I Can't Confess My Heart, I Wanna Confirm Your Heart	My Heart言い出せない, Your Heart確かめたい	My Heart Iidasenai, Your Heart Tashikametai	4:12
4.	Pictures at an Exhibition (Add Strings Version)	展覧会の絵	Tenrankai no E (Add Strings Version)	5:07
5.	Even Though My Unrequited Love Is Still Unknown	片思いしか知らないくせに	Kataomoi Shika Shiranai Kuseni	4:58
6.	I Can't Change It, I Can't Be Transmitted	きみを変えられない,ぼくが伝わらない	Kimi wo Kaerarenai, Boku ga Tsutawaranai	5:16
7.	Afternoon Nap (Instrumental)	N/A	N/A	2:08
8.	Congratulations! (Add Strings Version)	N/A	N/A	4:24
9.	God's Present	神さまの贈りもの	Kami-sama no Okurimono	8:28
10.	Epilogue (Instrumental)	Epilogue (インストゥルメンタル)	Epilogue (Instrumental)	1:30

=== Singles Plus ===
English:	Singles Plus	Kanji:	ああっ女神さまっ Singles+<キャラソンcomplete>	Romaji:	Aa! Megami-sama! Singles+ <Kyarason complete>
Artist:		Play Time:	44:09, 46:19	Manufacturer:	Pony Canyon
Catalog #:	PCCG-00558-1; PCCG-00558-2	# of Discs:	2	Printing Date:	2000-12-20

#	English Title	Japanese Title		Time
#	English Title	Kanji	Romaji	Time
Disc 1
1.	Happiness Accelerates	しあわせが加速する	Shiawase ga Kasoku Suru	4:20
2.	A Goddess Sings	女神はうたう	Megami wa Utau	4:29
3.	Call Me Goddess!	女神さまっとお呼び!	Megami-sama to Oyobi!	4:03
4.	Don't Treat Me Like a Child	子供扱いしないでよ	Kodomo Atsukai Shinaide Yo	3:56
5.	A Girl Waiting for a Shooting Star	流れ星を待つ少女	Nagareboshi wo Matsu Shoujo	4:42
6.	Affection	愛情	Aijou	4:40
7.	You Can't Catch Me	捕まらないよ	Tsukamara nai Yo	4:10
8.	Fortune Smiled on You	N/A	N/A	4:22
9.	Rice Balls	おにぎり	Onigiri	4:15
10.	Your Birthday	あなたのBirthday	Anata no Birthday	5:12
Disc 2
1.	A Goddess's Feelings	女神の気持ち	Megami no Kimochi	5:41
2.	I Can't Leave Him Alone	放っとけないのさ	Hottokenai No Sa	4:28
3.	Greetings with a Waltz	ワルツであいさつ	Waltz de Aisatsu	4:14
4.	Memory of Petals	花びらの記憶	Hanabira no Kioku	4:52
5.	Meaningful Tears	なみだの意味	Namida no Imi	4:30
6.	Bicycle	自転車	Jitensha	4:40
7.	Summoning a Starry Sky	星空召喚	Hoshizora Shoukan	3:54
8.	The Law of Love	恋の法則	Koi no Housoku	4:43
9.	To Live with Me Is Your Happiness (Kikuko Inoue)	僕と生きることが君のしあわせ	Boku to Ikiru Koto ga Kimi no Shiawase	4:31
10.	A Message from God	神さまの伝言	Kami-sama no Dengon	4:46

=== King of Extra Gifts Plus (Tokuten-ou Plus) ===
English:	King of Extra Gifts Plus	Kanji:	ああっ女神さまっ 特典王+	Romaji:	Aa! Megami-sama! Tokuten-ou Plus
Artist:		Play Time:	60:00, 44:47	Manufacturer:	Pony Canyon
Catalog #:	PCCG-00559-1; PCCG-00559-2	# of Discs:	2	Printing Date:	2000-12-20

#	English Title	Japanese Title		Time
#	English Title	Kanji	Romaji	Time
Disc 1
1.	The Poor's Dance, Narration	貧乏の踊りサービス	Binbou no Odori Saabisu
2.	High Quality Song	N/A	N/A
3.	The Man and Goddess's Love Song	男と女神のラブ・ソング	Otoko to megami no Love Song
4.	Oh Urd! 1	おおっウルド1	Oo! Urudo 1
5.	You're Not an Elementary School Student Any More, Right?	小学生じゃないんだから	Shougakusei ja Nainda Kara
6.	Greeting by Goddess Folk-song Club	GFsCあいさつ	Goddess Folk-song Club Aisatsu
7.	Unlucky Day	仏滅	Butsumetsu
8.	Woman of Nekomi	猫実の女	Nekomi no Hito
9.	Oh Urd! 2	おおっウルド2	Oo! Urudo 2
10.	Fight! Banpei-kun RX	闘えっ!ばんぺいくんRX	Tatakae! Banpei-kun RX
11.	The Four-Wheel Club Is Now Welcoming Newcomers	4輪部入会受け付け中	Yonrinbu Nyuukai Uketsuke Chuu
12.	The Song of the Motor Club	正調・自動車部々歌	Seichou – Jidoushabu Buka
13.	Devil's CD Notice	「悪魔のCD」告知	"Akuma no CD" Kokuchi
14.	Don't Abuse My Name without Permission	勝手に名前を使わないでね	Katte ni Namae wo Tsukawanaide Ne
15.	Like I Said, It's Not Me	だから私じゃないんです	Dakara watashi ja Nain Desu
16.	Let's Play with the Composer Mecha	作曲くんメカと遊ぼう	Sakkyoku-kun Meka to Asobou
17.	Rescue This Rude Disc!	無礼な音盤を救え!	Burei na Onban o Sukue!
18.	As If the Earth Would Smile	地球が微笑むように	Chikyuu ga Hohoemu you Ni
19.	I Can't Leave Him Alone – Everyone Together!	放っとけないのさ全員集合!	Hottokenai No Sa Zen'in Shuugou!
Disc 2
1.		(20秒CM)紅談茶	(20 Byou CM) Koudancha
2.		(20秒CM)元気もりもり君アイス	(20 Byou CM) Genki Morimori-kun Aisu
3.	Happiness Accelerates (Live)	しあわせが加速する (ライヴ・ヴァージョン)	Shiawase ga Kasoku Suru (Raivu vājon)
4.	A Message from God (Live)	神さまの伝言 (ライヴ・ヴァージョン)	Kami-sama no Dengon (Raivu vājon)
5.		(20秒CM)コース-化粧品・夏の新色	(20 Byou CM) Kousuu Keshouhin: Natsu no Shinshoku
6.		(20秒CM)フジシマの編み棒	Fujishima no Amibou
7.	I Can't Leave Him Alone (Claim Taishougaihen Version)	放っとけないのさ(クレーム対象外編)
8.	Call Me Gan-chan!	デンワして岩ちゃん	Denwa Shite Gan-chan
9.		(20秒CM)猫実予備校	(20 Byou CM) Nekomi Yobikou
10.	(20-second CM) Kodansha "Afternoon"	(20秒CM)講談社「アフタヌーン」	(20 Byou CM) Kodansha "Afternoon"
11.	Call Me Darling	デンワしてダーリン	Denwa Shite Daarin
12.	XXX (Kiss Kiss Kiss)	N/A	N/A
13.	(20-second CM) Belldandy "A Goddess's Feelings"	(20秒CM)ベルダンディー「女神の気持ち」	(20 Byou CM) Berudandii "Megami no Kimochi"
14.	(20-second CM) Skuld "The Law of Love"	(20秒CM)スクルド「恋の法則」	(20 Byou CM) Sukurudo "Koi no Housoku"
15.	Pictures at an Exhibition	展覧会の絵	Tenrankai no E
16.	To Live with Me Is Your Happiness	僕と生きることが君のしあわせ	Boku to Ikiru Koto ga Kimi no Shiawase
17.	(20-second CM) Urd "Call Me Goddess!"	(20秒CM)ウルド「女神さまっとお呼び!」	(20 Byou CM) Urudo "Megami-sama to Oyobi!"
18.	(20-second CM) Mikami Debut Pack	(20秒CM)三神デビュー・パック	(20 Byou CM) Mikami Debyuu Pakku
19.	I Can't Confess My Heart, I Wanna Confirm Your Heart (DVD Size)	My Heart言い出せない, Your Heart確かめたい(DVDサイズ)	My Heart Iidasenai, Your Heart Tashikametai (DVD saizu)
20.	Congratulations! (DVD Size)	Congratulations!(DVDサイズ)	Contratulations (DVD Saizu)

=== OVA Soundtrack Plus (Ongakuhen Plus) ===
English:	OVA Soundtrack Plus	Kanji:	ああっ女神さまっ 音楽編+	Romaji:	Aa! Megami-sama! Ongakuhen Plus
Artist:		Play Time:	53:30, 60:25	Manufacturer:	Pony Canyon
Catalog #:	PCCG-00560-1; PCCG-00560-2	# of Discs:	2	Printing Date:	2000-12-20

#	English Title	Japanese Title		Time
#	English Title	Kanji	Romaji	Time
Disc 1
1.	I Can't Confess My Heart, I Wanna Confirm Your Heart (GFC)	My Heart言い出せない, Your Heart確かめたい	My Heart Iidasenai, Your Heart Tashikametai	4:15
2.	Goddess Descent	女神降臨	Megami Koriin	0:50
3.	Entreaty	哀願	Aigan	2:21
4.	Acceptability	受理	Juri	0:36
5.	Force	強制力	Kyoosei Ryoku	1:34
6.	Unreliable Friends	あてにならない友達	Ate ni Nara nai Todomachi	0:25
7.	Contract	契約	Keiyaku	1:32
8.	Critical Moment	危機一髪	Kikiippatsu	0:56
9.	Catch (Nyaa)	N/A	N/A	0:08
10.	Mind Complication (Variation)	複雑な気持ち(テイクB)	Fukuzatsu na Kimochi (Teiku B)	1:08
11.	Restoration	修復	Shuufuku	1:48
12.	Affectionate Atmosphere	やすらかな雰囲気	Ya Sura Kana Funiki	0:39
13.	Meddler	おせっかい者	Osekkai Sha	2:26
14.	Restfulness	安穏	Annon	0:49
15.	Fortune	幸運の女神	Kooun no Megami	1:46
16.	Seaside	海辺	Umibe	0:19
17.	Sexy Dynamite!! Part 2	セクシーダイナマイト・パート2	Sekushii Dainamaito!! Paato Tsuu	0:38
18.	Troublesome Cupid	厄介なキューピッド	Yakkai na Kyuupiddo	1:49
19.	Marine House	海の家	Umi no Ie	1:11
20.	How Splendid!	なんて素敵だ!	Nante Suteki Da!	1:29
21.	Catch (Pafu)	N/A	N/A	0:07
22.	Sweetheart	恋人	Koibito	1:42
23.	Teardrops	涙	Namida	1:56
24.	Shock!	ショック!	Shokku!	1:08
25.	My Dear	愛しい人	Itoshii Hito	1:18
26.	With the Result...	というわけで...	Toyuu Wake De...	0:54
27.	Piano Sonata "Heavens"	ピアノソナタ"天界"	Piano Sonata "Tenkai"	1:12
28.	The Song of Egg (Kikuko Inoue)	たまごのうた	Tamago no Uta	0:41
29.	And Troublemaker	またも厄介者	Mata mo Yakkai Sha	0:14
30.	Cake with Tea	ケーキと紅茶	Keeki to Koocha	1:43
31.	Yearning	思慕	Shibo	0:48
32.	With Reason	理由があって	Riyuu Ga at Te	0:37
33.	Mission From Seniors	先輩からの指令	Senpai Karo no Shirei	1:30
34.	Excellent Beauty	素晴らしき人	Subarashiki Hito	1:10
35.	Catch (Boon)	N/A	N/A	0:09
36.	Well-constructed Equation	整った数式	Totonot Ta Suushiki	0:28
37.	Fancy	空想	Kuusoo	0:28
38.	Super Motorcycle	スーパーバイク	Suupaa Baiku	1:51
39.	Early Childhood	幼い頃	Osanai Koro	1:00
40.	Clear Sky	晴天	Seiten	2:39
41.	First Racing	第一レース	Dai Ichii Reesu	0:38
42.	Struggle for Mastery	争奪戦	Soodatsu Sen	0:34
43.	Winning Passion	勝利への情熱	Shoori e no Joonetsu	1:46
44.	Victory!	優勝!	Yuushoo!	1:00
45.	Street	道	Michi	1:35
Disc 2
1.	Piano Sonata "Illusion"	ピアノソナタ"幻想"	Piano Sonata "Gensoo"	2:12
2.	Premonition	予感	Yokan	2:10
3.	Snow Playing	雪合戦	Yukigassen	1:11
4.	Chasing	追っかけっこ	Ok Kakekko	0:18
5.	Notice From God	神さまからの警告	Kamisama Kara no Keikoku	2:20
6.	Catch (Cheen)	N/A	N/A	0:09
7.	Admonition	忠告	Chuukoku	1:56
8.	Feel Oppressed	苦しい胸中	Kurushii Kyoochuu	1:28
9.	Be Destined	運命づけられて	Unmei Zuke Rare Te	1:27
10.	Sweet-tempered Letter	やさしさの手紙	Yasashi Sa no Tegami	2:10
11.	Fate Had a Past	過去を持った運命の女神	Kako o Mot ta Unmei no Megami	2:27
12.	Serious Menace	重大な脅威	Juudai na Kyooi	1:13
13.	Misfortune	不運	Fuun	2:04
14.	For My Goddess	女神のために	Megami no Tame Ni	1:09
15.	Our Dream (Without Brass)	僕たちの夢(ブラス抜き)	Boku Tachi no Yume (Burasu Nuki)	2:14
16.	Grief-stricken Twosomes	悲しみに打ちひしがれた二人	Kanashimi ni Uchi Hishigareta Futari	2:09
17.	Sympathy	共鳴	Kyoomei	1:40
18.	Memories	思い出	Omoide	2:03
19.	Ring of Promise	約束の指輪	Yakusoku no Yubiwa	0:52
20.	Compulsory Repatriation	強制送還	Kyoosei Sookan	0:55
21.	Last Importance	最も大事なこと	Mottomo Daiji Na Koto	0:27
22.	All Over with Her	すべては終わった	Subete wa Owat Ta	1:16
23.	Recollection	思い出した	Omoidashi Ta	2:08
24.	Despaired Of...	絶望	Zetsuboo	0:57
25.	Ties in the Past	過去の絆	Kako no Kizuna	2:10
26.	Promise and Contract	約束と契約	Yakusoku to Keiyaku	0:46
27.	Breach of Contract	契約違反	Keiyaku Ihan	2:19
28.	Congratulations! (Piano)	Congratulations!(ピアノテイク)	Congratulations! (Pianoteiku)	1:35
29.	Congratulations! (GFC)	Congratulations!	Congratulations!	4:27
30.	Mind Complication	複雑な気持ち(テイクA)	Fukuzatsu na Kimochi (Teiku A)	2:06
31.	Early Childhood (Variation)	幼い頃(左手なし)	Osanai Koro (Hidarite Nashi)	0:56
32.	Premonition (Difference)	予感(イッちゃってる)	Yokan (Ic Chat Teru)	1:20
33.	Notice from God (On Melody)	神様からの警告(メロ入り)	Kamisama Kara no Keikoku (Mero Iri)	2:20
34.	Our Dream	僕たちの夢	Boku Tachi no Yume	2:15
35.	Despaired Of... (On Timpani)	絶望(ティンパニ入り)	Zetsuboo (Tinpani Iri)	0:58
36.	Breach of Contract (On Solo)	契約違反(アドリブ入り)	Keiyaku Ihan (Adoribu Iri)	2:18

== Oh My Goddess! (OVA) ==
=== I Can't Confess My Heart, I Wanna Confirm Your Heart (My Heart Iidasenai, Your Heart Tashikametai) ===
- I Can't Confess My Heart, I Wanna Confirm Your Heart is the intro theme for the OVA series. One verse is borrowed from the American Civil War tune Aura Lea.
- Congratulations! is the outro theme for the OVA series.

English:	I can't confess my heart, I wanna confirm your heart	Kanji:	My Heart 言い出せない, Your Heart 確かめたい	Romaji:	My Heart Iidasenai, Your Heart Tashikametai
Artist:	Goddess Family Club	Play Time:	17:20	Manufacturer:	Pony Canyon
Catalog #:	PCDG-00055	# of Discs:	1	Printing Date:	1993-01-22

#	English Title	Japanese Title		Time
#	English Title	Kanji	Romaji	Time
1.	I Can't Confess My Heart, I Wanna Confirm Your Heart	マイ・ハート言い出せない ユア・ハート確かめたい	My Heart Iidasenai, Your Heart Tashikametai	4:16
2.	Congratulations!	コングラチュレイションズ	Omedetou!	4:25
3.	I Can't Confess My Heart, I Wanna Confirm Your Heart (Instrumental) (Takeshi Yasuda)	マイ・ハート言い出せないユア・ハート確かめたい (インストゥルメンタル)	My Heart Iidasenai, Your Heart Tashikametai (Instrumental)	4:16
4.	Congratulations! (Instrumental) (Takeshi Yasuda)	コングラチュレイションズ (インストゥルメンタル)	Omedetou! (Instrumental)	4:23

=== OVA Original Soundtrack 1 ===
English:	Oh My Goddess! Original Soundtrack Vol 1	Kanji:	ああっ女神さまっ 音楽編 Vol.1	Romaji:	Aa! Megami-Sama Ongaku Shuu Vol.1
Artist:	Takeshi Yasuda	Play Time:	42:28	Manufacturer:	Pony Canyon
Catalog #:	PCCG-00237	# of Discs:	1	Printing Date:	1993-08-22

#	English Title	Japanese Title		Time
#	English Title	Kanji	Romaji	Time
1.	I Can't Confess My Heart, I Wanna Confirm Your Heart (GFC)	オープニング主題歌~マイ・ハート言い出せない,ユア・ハート確かめたい	Oopuningu Shudaika ~ Mai Haato Iidasenai, Yua Haato Tashikametai	4:15
2.	Goddess Descent	ゴッデス・ディセント	Goddesu Disento	0:50
3.	Entreaty	エントリーティ	Entoriiti	2:22
4.	Acceptability	アセプタビリティ	Aseputabiriti	0:36
5.	Force	フォース	Foosu	1:35
6.	Unreliable Friends	アンリリーブル・フレンズ	Anririibu Furenzu	0:26
7.	Contract	コンタクト	Kontakuto	1:32
8.	Critical Moment	クリティカル・モーメント	Kuritikaru Moomento	0:57
9.	Catch (Nyaa)	キャッチ(nyaa)	Kyatchi (nyaa)	0:09
10.	Mind Complication	マインド・コンプリケーション	Maindo Konpurikeeshon	2:06
11.	Restoration	レストレーション	Resutoreeshon	1:49
12.	Affectionate Atmosphere	アフェクショネート・アトモスフェアー	Afekushoneeto Atomosufeaa	0:39
13.	Meddler	メドラー	Medoraa	2:27
14.	Restfulness	レストフルネス	Resutofurunesu	0:49
15.	Ending Theme Song ~ Congratulations! (Video & LD Size) (Midsummer Night's Dream) (OVA size) (GFC)	エンディング主題歌~コングラチュレイションズ!(ビデオ&LDサイズ) 〈ミッドサマー・ナイツ・ドリーム〉	Endingu Shudaika ~ Kongurachureishonzu! (Bideo & LD Saizu) (Midosamaa Naitsu Doriimu	1:33
16.	Opening Theme Song ~ I Can't Confess My Heart, I Wanna Confirm Your Heart (Video Size) (OVA size) (GFC)	オープニング主題歌~マイ・ハート言い出せない, ユア・ハート確かめたい(ビデオ&LDサイズ)	Oopuningu Shudaika ~ Mai Haato Iidasenai, Yua Haato Tashikametai (Bideo & LD Saizu)	1:36
17.	Fortune	フォーチュン	Foochun	1:47
18.	Seaside	シー・サイド	Shii Saido	0:20
19.	Sexy Dynamite!! Part 2	セクシー・ダイナマイト!!パート2	Sekushii Dainamaito!! Paato Tsuu	0:38
20.	Troublesome Cupid	トラブルサム・キューピッド	Toraburusamu Kyuupiddo	1:50
21.	Marine House	マリーン・ハウス	Mariin Hausu	1:12
22.	How Splendid!	ハウ・スプレンディド!	Hau Supurendido	1:29
23.	Catch (Pafu)	キャッチ(pafu)	Kyatchi (pafu)	0:07
24.	Sweetheart	スウィートハート	Suwiitohaato	1:43
25.	Teardrops	ティアドロップス	Teadoroppusu	1:57
26.	Shock!	ショック!	Shokku!	1:08
27.	My Dear	マイ・ディアー	Mai Diaa	1:19
28.	With the Result...	ウィズ・ザ・リサルト...	Wizu za Risaruto...	0:54
29.	Ending Theme Song ~ Congratulations! (GFC)	エンディング主題歌~コングラチュレイションズ!	Endingu Shudaika – Kongurachureishonzu!	4:23

=== OVA Original Soundtrack 2 ===
English:	Oh My Goddess! Original Soundtrack Vol 2	Kanji:	ああっ女神さまっ 音楽編 VOL.2	Romaji:	Aa! Megami-Sama! Ongaku Shū VOL. 2
Artist:	Takeshi Yasuda	Play Time:	73:26	Manufacturer:	Pony Canyon
Catalog #:	PCCG-00258	# of Discs:	1	Printing Date:	1994-06-01

#	English Title	Japanese Title		Time
#	English Title	Kanji	Romaji	Time
1.	Piano Sonata "Heavens"	ピアノ・ソナタ"ヘヴンス"	Piano Sonata "Hevunsu"	1:13
2.	I Can't Confess My Heart, I Wanna Confirm Your Heart (Video & LD size) (GFC)	マイ・ハート言い出せない, ユア・ハート確かめたい	Mai Haato Iidasenai, Yua Haato Tashikametai	1:36
3.	And Troublemaker	アンド・トラブルメイカー	Ando Toraburumeikaa	0:14
4.	Cake with Tea	ケーク・ウイズ・ティー	Keeku uizu Tii	1:43
5.	Yearning	ヤーニング	Yaaningu	0:48
6.	With Reason	ウィズ・リーズン	Wizu Riizun	0:37
7.	Mission From Seniors	ミッション・フロム・シニアズ	Misshon Furomu Shiniazu	1:30
8.	Excellent Beauty	エクセレント・ビューティ	Ekuzerento Byuuti	1:10
9.	Catch (Boon)	キャッチ(ブーン)	Kyatchi (buun)	0:09
10.	Well-constructed Equation	ウェル・コンストラクテッド・エクエーション	Weru Konsutorakutedo Ekueeshon	0:11
11.	Fancy	ファンシー	Fanshii	0:28
12.	Super Motorcycle	スーパー・モーターサイクル	Suupaa Mootaasaikuru	1:51
13.	Early Childhood	アーリー・チャイルドフッド	Aarii Chairodofuddo	1:00
14.	Clear Sky	クリア・スカイ	Kurea Sukai	2:39
15.	First Racing	ファースト・レーシング	Faasuto Reeshingu	0:38
16.	Struggle for Mastery	スタッグル・フォー・マステリー	Sutagguru foo Masuterī	0:34
17.	Winning Passion	ウィニング・パッション	Winingu Passhon	1:46
18.	Victory!	ヴィクトリー!	Vikutorii!	1:00
19.	Street	ストリート	Sutoriito	1:38
20.	The Song of Egg (Evergreen Holy Night) (Kikuko Inoue)	たまごのうた 〈エヴァーグリーン・ホリー・ナイト〉	Tamago no Uta (Evaaguriin Horii Naito)	0:41
21.	Piano Sonata "Illusion"	ピアノ・ソナタ"イリュージョン"	Piano Sonata "Iriuujon"	2:12
22.	Premonition	プレモニション	Puremonishon	2:10
23.	Snow Playing	スノウ・プレイング	Sunou Pureingu	1:11
24.	Chasing	チェイシング	Cheishingu	0:18
25.	Notice From God	ノーティス・フロム・ゴッド	Nootisu furomu Goddo	2:20
26.	Catch (Cheen)	キャッチ(チーン)	Kyatchi (chiin)	0:09
27.	Admonition	アドモニション	Adomonishon	1:56
28.	Feel Oppressed	フィール・オプレスド	Fiiro Opresudo	1:28
29.	Be Destined	ビー・デスティネド	Bii Desutinedo	1:27
30.	Sweet-tempered Letter	スウィート・テンパード・レター	Suwiito Tenpaado Retaa	2:10
31.	Fate Had a Past	フェイト・ハド・ア・パスト	Feito Hado A Pasuto	2:27
32.	To Live With Me Is Your Happiness (For the Love of Goddess) (Masami Kikuchi)	僕と生きることが君のしあわせ 〈フォー・ザ・ラヴ・オブ・ゴッデス〉	Boku to Ikiru Koto ga Kimi no Shiawase (Foo za Rabu obu Goddesu)	4:59
33.	Serious Menace	シリアス・ミネース	Shiriasu Mineesu	1:13
34.	Misfortune	ミスフォーチュン	Misufoochun	2:04
35.	For My Goddess	フォー・マイ・ゴッデス	Foo Mai Goddesu	1:09
36.	Our Dream	アワ・ドリーム	Awa Doriim	2:15
37.	Grief-stricken Twosomes	グリーフ・ストリッケン・トゥーサムズ	Gurīfu Strikken Tuusamuzu	2:09
38.	Sympathy	シンパシー	Shinpashii	1:40
39.	Memories	メモリーズ	Memoriizu	2:03
40.	Ring of Promise	リング・オブ・プロミス	Ringu obu Puromisu	0:52
41.	Compulsory Repatriation	コンパルソリー・レパトリエイション	Konparusorii Repatorieishon	0:55
42.	Last Importance	ラスト・インポータンス	Rasuto Inpootansu	0:27
43.	All Over with Her	オール・オーヴァー・ウィズ・ハー	Ooru Oovaa wizu Haa	1:16
44.	Recollection	リコレクション	Rikorekushon	2:08
45.	Despaired Of...	デスペアド・オブ...	Desupeado Obu...	0:57
46.	Ties in the Past	タイズ・イン・ザ・パスト	Taizu in za Pasuto	2:10
47.	Promise and Contract	プロミス・アンド・コンタクト	Puromisu ando Kontacto	0:46
48.	Breach of Contract	ブリーチ・オブ・コンタクト	Buriichi obu Kontakuto	2:19
49.	Congratulations! (Reprise) (GFC)	コングラチュレイションズ!(リプライズ)	Kongurachureishonzu! (ripuraizu)	4:50

== The Adventures of Mini-Goddess ==
=== Call Me Darling (Denwa Shite Daarin) ===
- Call Me Darling by Yuki Ishii is the outro theme for the mini series. (eps 1-24)

English:	Call Me Darling	Kanji:	デンワしてダーリン	Romaji:	Denwa Shite Daarin
Artist:	Yuki Ishii	Play Time:	12:40	Manufacturer:	Pony Canyon
Catalog #:	PCDA-95028	# of Discs:	1	Printing Date:	1998-06-03

#	English Title	Japanese Title		Time
#	English Title	Kanji	Romaji	Time
1.	Call Me Darling	デンワしてダーリン	Denwa Shite Daarin	4:28
2.	Summer's Future	夏の未来	Natsu no Mirai	3:44
3.	Call Me Darling (Instrumental)	デンワしてダーリン (インストゥルメンタル)	Denwa Shite Daarin (Instrumental)	4:28

=== XXX (Kiss Kiss Kiss) ===
- XXX (Kiss Kiss Kiss) by SPLASH is the outro theme for the mini series. (eps 25-48)
- All tracks on the album had English titles while the songs themselves are in Japanese.

English:	XXX (Kiss Kiss Kiss)	Kanji:	N/A	Romaji:	N/A
Artist:	SPLASH	Play Time:	15:03	Manufacturer:	Pony Canyon
Catalog #:	PCDA-01114	# of Discs:	1	Printing Date:	1998-12-02

#	English Title	Time
1.	XXX (Kiss Kiss Kiss)	3:54
2.	Just First Love	3:39
3.	XXX (Kiss Kiss Kiss) (Instrumental) (Kouji Makaino)	3:53
4.	Just First Love (Instrumental) (Kouji Makaino)	3:37

=== Mini-Goddess Original Soundtrack 1 ===
English:	Original Soundtrack 1	Kanji:	音楽編って事は愉快だねっ	Romaji:	Ongakuhen ~Tte Koto wa Yukai da Ne
Artist:	Tatsuya Murayama	Play Time:	34:30	Manufacturer:	Pony Canyon
Catalog #:	PCCG-00465	# of Discs:	1	Printing Date:	1998-10-21

#	English Title	Japanese Title		Time
#	English Title	Kanji	Romaji	Time
1.	Let's Tell Your Fortune	占いしようよっ	Uranaishiyouyo	1:45
2.	Secret Treasure in the Attic, Part I	屋根裏の秘宝・前編	Yaneura no Hihou · Zenpen	3:14
3.	Secret Treasure in the Attic, Part II	屋根裏の秘宝・後編	Yaneura no Hihou · Kouhen	2:50
4.	Let's Fly in the Sky	空を飛ぼうよっ	Sorawo Tobouyo	1:28
5.	Let's Fly into Space	宇宙(そら)を翔(と)ぼうよっ	Uchuuuwo Tobouyo	2:17
6.	Slimming Down! Go!	スリムでGO!	Surimude GO!	0:59
7.	Gabira, the Giant Monster – The Birth	大怪獣ガビラ・誕生篇	Daikaijuu Gazera · Tanjuuhen	2:29
8.	Gabira – The Final Battle	大怪獣ガビラ・決戦篇	Daikaijuu Gazera · Kessenhen	1:36
9.	For Whom the Bell Tolls – The Mysterious Can of Food	誰が為に鐘は鳴る 缶詰の謎	Darega Tameni Kanewa Naru Kanzume no Nazo	1:10
10.	For Whom the Bell Tolls – The Secret of the Diamond	誰が為に鐘は鳴る ダイヤの秘密	Darega Tameni Kanewa Naru Daiya no Himitsu	1:00
11.	Gabira – The Strike Back	大怪獣ガビラ・逆襲篇	Daikaijuu Gazera · Gyakushuuhen	1:52
12.	Let's Play Baseball	野球やろうぜっ	Yakyuu Yarouze	0:40
13.	Urd's Babysitting Adventures	ウルドの子守日記	Urudo no Komorinikki	0:25
14.	The Proposal Scheme	プロポーズ大作戦ですだ	Puropoozu Daisakusendesuda	0:54
15.	Welcome, Newlyweds!	新婚さんいらっしゃい!!ですだ	Shinkonsan Irasshai!!desuda	0:44
16.	Call Me Darling	デンワしてダーリンっ	Denwashite Daarin	0:42
17.	SOS in the Big Snowfield, Part I	大雪原SOS・前編	Daisetsugen SOS · Zenpen	0:55
18.	SOS in the Big Snowfield, Part II	大雪原SOS・後編	Daisetsugen SOS · Kouhen	1:10
19.	Kitchen Fighters	キッチンファイター	Kicchin Faitaa	2:04
20.	Gan-chan's Magnificent Days	岩ちゃんの華麗なる日々	Gan-chan no Karei Naru Hibi	0:24
21.	Ah! My Buddha	ああっ仏さまっ	Aa Hotoke-sama	0:35
22.	The Story of Gan-chan: Love Me to the Bone	岩ちゃんの骨まで愛して	Gan-chan no Honemade Aishite	0:23
23.	Let's Form a Band! Side A	バンドやろうぜ A面	Bando Yarouze A Men	0:14
24.	Let's Form a Band! Side B	バンドやろうぜ B面	Bando Yarouze B Men	0:12
25.	Call Me Darling (On Air Version) (Yuki Ishii)	デンワしてダーリン(石井ゆき)	Denwashite Daarin	4:28

=== Mini-Goddess Original Soundtrack 2 ===
English:	Original Soundtrack 2	Kanji:	音楽編2って事は続きだねっ	Romaji:	Ongakuhen 2 ~Tte Koto wa Tsuzuki da Ne
Artist:	Tatsuya Murayama	Play Time:		Manufacturer:	Pony Canyon
Catalog #:	PCCG-00487	# of Discs:	1	Printing Date:	1999-04-28

#	English Title	Japanese Title		Time
#	English Title	Kanji	Romaji	Time
1.	Chu-Hard – Gan-chan's Desperate Situation	チュウ・ハード 岩ちゃん絶体絶命	Chuu · Haado Gan-chan Zettai Zetsumei	2:50
2.	Chu-Hard 2 – Descent of the Devil	チュウ・ハード2 魔王降臨	Chuu · Haado 2 Maou Kourin	1:18
3.	Pop! Goes the Urd!	ウルドでPON!	Urudo-de PON!	1:28
4.	Rainy Day	N/A	N/A	7:08
5.	Let's Meet in Our Dreams	夢で逢いましょう	Yumede Aimashou	0:46
6.	Female Detective Skuld's First Case... Mystery of Three Stolen Treasures: The Dangerous Trap Hidden in Steamy Smoke!	月曜ワイドサスペンス劇場 女名探偵スクルドの事件簿1 盗まれた三つの秘宝の謎 湯煙に隠された危険な罠!	Getsuyou Waido Sasupensu Gekijou Onnameitantei Sukurudo no Jikenbo (1) Nusumareta Mittsu no Hihou no Nazo Yukemurini Kakusareta Kikennawana!	0:28
7.	Goddess Love Theater – Goddess Blade	女神 愛の劇場 女神の剣	Megami Ai no Gekijou Megami no Ken	3:33
8.	Quick Fix Division of the Tariki Hongan Temple	こちら他力本願寺内すぐやる課	Kochira Tarikihonganjinai Suguyaruka	0:17
9.	Fishing Journal	釣りバス日誌	Tsuribasu Nisshi	0:29
10.	Give Me Some Servants	我に僕を	Wareni Bokuwo	0:20
11.	Rules of the Ninja, Volume I	忍びのオキテ・上の巻	Shinobi no Okite · Jou no Maki	2:07
12.	Rules of the Ninja, Volume II	忍びのオキテ・下の巻	Shinobi no Okite · Ge no Maki	1:04
13.	Urd vs. Urd	ウルドVSウルド	Urudo VS Urudo	0:19
14.	Gan-chan Runs for Election "Being Self-Made" Edition	岩ちゃん選挙に立つ・立志編	Gan-chan Senkyonitatsu · Risshihen	1:02
15.	Gan-chan Runs for Election "Times of Change" Edition	岩ちゃん選挙に立つ・風雲編	Gan-chan Senkyonitatsu · Fuuunhen	0:43
16.	Urd's Ultimate Diet	ウルド究極ダイエット	Urudo Kyuukyoku Daietto	0:17
17.	Happy Birthday, Gan-chan	ハッピーバースディ岩ちゃん	Happii Baasudi Gan-chan	0:12
18.	Ah! My Average College Student	ああっ平凡な大学生っ	Aa Heibonna Daigakusei	0:17
19.	This Happens Once in a While	こんな事もあるんだねっ	Konna Kotomo Arundane	2:22
20.	Gan-chan the Locomotive	機関車岩ちゃん	Kikansha Gan-chan	4:14
21.	The Miso Jar	味噌の壷	Miso no Tsubo	0:12
22.	Deluxe Game of Life	DX人生すごろく・衛星版	DX Jinsei Sugoroku · Eiseiban	0:23
23.	Mekimeki High School Memorial	めきめきメモリアル	Mekimeki Memoriaru	2:09
24.	What'll Happen Next?	これからどうなるのっ	Korekara Dounaruno	0:07
25.	XXX (Kiss Kiss Kiss)	N/A	N/A	3:51

=== 100 Short Sayings! ===
English:	100 Short Sayings!	Kanji:	~小っちゃいって事は便利だね~オチ100連発!	Romaji:	Chicchaitte Kotowa Ochi 100 Renpatsudane!
Artist:	Goddess Fantastic Club	Play Time:	26:44	Manufacturer:	Pony Canyon
Catalog #:	PCCG-00457	# of Discs:	1	Printing Date:	1998-07-17

#	English Title	Japanese Title		Time
#	English Title	Kanji	Romaji	Time
1.	Sentences 01 to 20	小っちゃいって事はオチ100連発だねっ その01~20	Chicchaitte Kotowa Ochi 100 Renpatsudane (So no 01~20)	4:16
2.	Sentences 21 to 40	小っちゃいって事はオチ100連発だねっ その21~40	Chicchaitte Kotowa Ochi 100 Renpatsudane (So no 21~40)	4:36
3.	Sentences 41 to 60	小っちゃいって事はオチ100連発だねっ その41~60	Chicchaitte Kotowa Ochi 100 Renpatsudane (So no 41~60)	4:09
4.	Sentences 61 to 80	小っちゃいって事はオチ100連発だねっ その61~80	Chicchaitte Kotowa Ochi 100 Renpatsudane (So no 61~80)	4:22
5.	Sentences 81 to 100	小っちゃいって事はオチ100連発だねっ その81~100	Chicchaitte Kotowa Ochi 100 Renpatsudane (So no 81~100)	4:38
6.	Call Me Gan-chan!	デンワして岩ちゃん	Denwa Shite Gan-chan	4:43

=== Big Concert (Ôkkina Ensôkai) ===
English:	Big Concert	Kanji:	小っちゃいって事は便利だねっ オーケストラアルバム	Romaji:	Chicchai tte koto wa benri da ne Ôkestura Arubamu
Artist:	Tatsuya Murayama	Play Time:	41:43	Manufacturer:	Pony Canyon
Catalog #:	PCCG-00515	# of Discs:	1	Printing Date:	1999-12-01

#	English Title	Japanese Title		Time
#	English Title	Kanji	Romaji	Time
1.		女神組曲その1	Megami Kumikyoku So no 1	5:44
2.		女神組曲その2	Megami Kumikyoku So no 2	7:39
3.	Gabira	ガビラ	Gabira	7:31
4.	Ninja's Law	忍びのオキテ	Shinobi no Okite	4:05
5.		宇宙巡洋艦うずしおのテーマ	Uchuu Jun'youkan Uzushio no Têma	2:51
6.	Chuu Hard	チュウハート	Chuu Haato	5:15
7.	Rainy Day (Extra Track)	N/A	N/A	8:38

== Ah! My Goddess The Movie ==
=== Try to Wish ~What You Need~ (Try to Wish ~Kimi ni Hitsuyou na Mono~) ===
- Try to Wish ~What You Need~ by Saori Nishihata is the outro theme for the Movie.

English:	Try to Wish ~What You Need~	Kanji:	Try To Wish~キミに必要なもの~	Romaji:	Try to Wish ~Kimi ni Hitsuyou na Mono~
Artist:	Saori Nishihata	Play Time:	17:42	Manufacturer:	Pony Canyon
Catalog #:	PCCA-01474	# of Discs:	1	Printing Date:	2000-10-18

#	English Title	Japanese Title		Time
#	English Title	Kanji	Romaji	Time
1.	Try to Wish ~What You Need~	Try To Wish~キミに必要なもの~	Try to Wish ~Kimi ni Hitsuyou na Mono~	4:48
2.	Make a Way Please	N/A	N/A	4:04
3.	Try to Wish ~What You Need~ (Instrumental) (Nobuo Uematsu, Nittoku Inoue)	Try To Wish~キミに必要なもの~ (インストゥルメンタル)	Try to Wish ~Kimi ni Hitsuyou na Mono~ (Instrumental)	4:48
4.	Make a Way Please (Instrumental) (Mizuki, Nittoku Inoue)	N/A	N/A	4:02

=== Ah! My Goddess The Movie – Original Soundtrack ===
English:	Movie Soundtrack	Kanji:	「ああっ女神さまっ」劇場版サウンドトラック	Romaji:	Aa! Megami-sama! Gekijōban Saundotorakku
Artist:	Shirō Hamaguchi	Play Time:	66:25	Manufacturer:	Pony Canyon
Catalog #:	PCCG-00556	# of Discs:	1	Printing Date:	2000-11-01

#	English Title	Japanese Title		Time
#	English Title	Kanji	Romaji	Time
1.	Eternal Moon ~ One Who Disturbs His Sleep	luna aeterna~眠りを覚ます者~	Luna Aeterna ~ Nemuri o Samasu Mono	2:42
2.	Goddess Sings (Kikuko Inoue)	dea cantat 女神は歌う	Dea Cantat Megami wa Utau	1:10
3.	Spring, as Usual	春,かわらずに	Haru Kawarazu Ni	2:27
4.	Master ~ My Dear Master	magister~懐かしき師~	Magister ~ Natsukashiki Shi	3:48
5.	The Fountain of Heart	心の泉	Kokoro no Izumi	1:23
6.	Lesson of Love 3 (Ikue Ootani)	恋のレッスン3	Koi no Lesson 3	4:17
7.	Don't Expect Much...	期待しないで...	Kitai Shinai De...	1:34
8.	In Search of Link	絆,求めて	Kizuna Motome Te	3:08
9.	Surely If We Are Together	きっと二人なら	Kitto Futari Nara	1:46
10.	Trusting the Feeling	心,信じて	Kokoro, Shinji Te	0:58
11.	Jealousy ~ In Hesitation	invidia~心ゆれて~	Invidia ~ Kokoro Yure Te	1:11
12.	Reminiscence ~Nostalgia~ (Kikuko Inoue)	追想~nostalgia~	Tsuioku ~Nostalgia~	4:15
13.	Evil Crystal ~ Dark Sparkle	crystallus malus~暗い輝き~	Crystallus Malus ~ Kurai Kagayaki	0:57
14.	Celestin ~ The Leader of Rebellion	Celestin-Seditionis auctor	Celestin ~ Seditionis Auctor	2:30
15.	Confining One's Feeling	想い,閉じ込めて	Omoi, Tojikome Te	1:52
16.	Wind ~ The Raging Goddess	ventus~暴れる女神~	Ventus ~ Abareru Megami	2:34
17.	Hoping for Happiness	幸せ,願って	Shiawase, Nagatte	3:01
18.	Morgan ~ Sad Love	Morgan-amor tristis	Morgan ~ Amor Tristis	3:41
19.	Whisper of Life (Kikuko Inoue, Mio Shionoiri)	いのちの囁き	Inochi no Sasayaki	1:12
20.	Purpose ~ Rebelling Against Gods	propositum~神に抗う~	Propositum ~ Kami ni Aragau	3:18
21.	Thor ~ The God of Destruction	Thor~破壊の神~	Thor ~ Hakai no Kami	2:08
22.	Annihilating Thunder	激減轟雷	Gekimetsu Gourai	2:09
23.	Testimony Between Us	二人の証	Futari no Akashi	1:23
24.	Chorus of Goddesses (Goddess Family Club)	coro di dea 女神達の歌声(メインテーマ)	Coro Di Dea Megami Tachi no Utagoe (Mein Teema)	2:01
25.	Prelude of the New World	新世界 序曲	Shinsekai Jokyoku	3:07
26.	Try to Wish ~What You Need~ (Saori Nishihata)	Try To Wish~キミに必要なもの~(主題歌)	Try to Wish ~Kimi ni Hitsuyou na Mono~ (Shudaika)	4:50
27.	Song of the Angels (Chorus Only) (Warsaw Chorus)	cantilena angeli 天使の歌	Cantilena Angeli Tenshi no Uta	3:03

== Ah! My Goddess TV Series ==
=== Open Your Mind ~Spreading Little Wings~ (Open Your Mind ~Chiisana Hane Hirogete~) ===
- Open Your Mind ~Spreading Little Wings~ by Yoko Ishida is the intro theme for the first season of the TV series. (eps 1-26)
- Wish is the outro theme for the first season of the TV series. (eps 1-12, special episode, 24)

English:	Open Your Mind ~Spreading Little Wings~	Kanji:	Open Your Mind ～小さな羽根ひろげて～	Romaji:	Open Your Mind ~Chiisana Hane Hirogete~
Artist:	Yoko Ishida	Play Time:	16:10	Manufacturer:	Geneon
Catalog #:	GNCA-0007	# of Discs:	1	Printing Date:	2005-01-26

#	English Title	Japanese Title		Time
#	English Title	Kanji	Romaji	Time
1.	Open Your Mind ~Spreading Little Wings~	Open Your Mind ～小さな羽根ひろげて～	Open Your Mind ~Chiisana Hane Hirogete~	4:19
2.	Wish	願い	Negai	3:47
3.	Open Your Mind ~Spreading Little Wings~ (Instrumental) (Masami Kishimura, Shirou Hamaguchi)	Open Your Mind ～小さな羽根ひろげて～ (インストゥルメンタル)	Open Your Mind ~Chiisana Hane Hirogete~ (Instrumental)	4:19
4.	Wish (Instrumental) (Akifumi Tada)	願い (インストゥルメンタル)	Negai (Instrumental)	3:45

=== Wing ===
- Wing by Yoko Takahashi is the outro theme for the first season of the TV series. (eps 13–23, 25-26)

English:	Wing	Kanji:	N/A	Romaji:	N/A
Artist:	Yoko Takahashi	Play Time:	16:51	Manufacturer:	Geneon
Catalog #:	GNCA-0008	# of Discs:	1	Printing Date:	2005-05-18

#	English Title	Japanese Title		Time
#	English Title	Kanji	Romaji	Time
1.	Wing	N/A	N/A	3:14
2.	On White Wings	白い翼で	Shiroi Tsubasa De	5:13
3.	Wing (Instrumental) (Toshiyuki Omori)	N/A	N/A	3:13
4.	On White Wings (Instrumental) (Toshiyuki Omori)	白い翼で (インストゥルメンタル)	Shiroi Tsubasa De (Instrumental)	5:11

=== TV Series Original Soundtrack 1 ===
English:	Original Soundtrack 1	Kanji:	ああっ女神さまっ Original Sound Track－1（通常盤）	Romaji:
Artist:	Shirō Hamaguchi	Play Time:	43:57	Manufacturer:	Geneon
Catalog #:	GNCA-1023 (Limited Edition); GNCA-1024 (Regular Edition)	# of Discs:	1	Printing Date:	2005-02-25

#	English Title	Japanese Title		Time
#	English Title	Kanji	Romaji	Time
1.	Open Your Mind ~Spread Your Small Wings~ (On Air Version) (Yoko Ishida)	OPEN YOUR MIND ～小さな羽根ひろげて～	Open Your Mind ~Chiisana Hane Hirogete~	1:31
2.	Prologue	プロローグ	Puroroogu	1:56
3.	Motor Club	自動車部	Jidousha-bu	1:38
4.	Race	レース	Reesu	1:21
5.	Urd	ウルド	Urudo	1:28
6.	Seductive Strike	お色気攻撃	Oiroke Kougeki	1:29
7.	Tamiya, Ootaki Senpai	田宮、大滝先輩	Tamiya, Ootaki Senpai	1:33
8.	Uproar	大騒ぎ	Oosawagi	1:46
9.	Throbbing Heart	ドキドキ	Dokidoki	1:41
10.	Feeling of Love	恋する気持ち	Koisuru Kimochi	2:10
11.	Troublemaker	トラブルメーカー	Toraubru Meekaa	1:09
12.	2nd Class Goddess, 1st Category, Limited	2級神1種限定	Nikyuushin Isshu Gentei	1:30
13.	Tiny Waltz	N/A	N/A	1:27
14.	System Force (The Philharmonic Chorus of Tokyo)	強制力	Kyouseiryoku	1:19
15.	Eyecatch A	アイキャッチA	Ai-kyatchi Ee	0:09
16.	Belldandy	ベルダンディー	Berudandii	1:36
17.	Gentle Heart	優しい心	Yasashii Kokoro	2:12
18.	Sorrow	悲しみ	Kanashimi	1:20
19.	For the Sake of My Beloved	愛する人のために	Aisuru Hito no Tame Ni	2:01
20.	Faint Heartache	微かな胸騒ぎ	Kasukana Munasawagi	1:34
21.	Sayoko	沙夜子	Sayoko	1:21
22.	Silent Confrontation	静かな対決	Shizukana Taiketsu	1:59
23.	Approaching Terror	迫り来る恐怖	Semarikuru Kyoufu	1:09
24.	Magic Battle	魔法バトル	Mahou Batoru	1:33
25.	1st Class Goddess, 2nd Category, Unlimited ~Sanctus~ (The Philharmonic Chorus of Tokyo)	1級神2種非限定 ～Sanctus～	Nikyuushin Isshu Gentei ~Sanctus~	2:12
26.	Friendship	友情	Yuujou	1:43
27.	Happy End	ハッピーエンド	Happii Endo	1:21
28.	Preview	予告	Yokoku	0:18
29.	Wish (On Air Version) (Yoko Ishida)	願い	Negai	1:31

=== TV Series Original Soundtrack 2 ===
English:	Original Soundtrack 2	Kanji:	ああっ女神さまっ Original Sound Track-2	Romaji:
Artist:	Shirō Hamaguchi	Play Time:	41:52	Manufacturer:	Geneon
Catalog #:	GNCA-1041	# of Discs:	1	Printing Date:	2005-06-24

#	English Title	Japanese Title		Time
#	English Title	Kanji	Romaji	Time
1.	Heaven	天上界	Tenjoukai	1:16
2.	Subtitle	サブタイトル	Sabutaitoru	0:07
3.	One Gentle Day	穏やかな一日	Odayakana Ichinichi	1:43
4.	First Date	初めてデート	Hajimete Deeto	1:21
5.	A Ride in the Sidecar	サイドカーに乗って	Saidokaa ni Notte	2:04
6.	Marller	マーラー	Maaraa	1:36
7.	Urd Runs Wild!	ウルド暴走！	Urudo Bousou!	1:38
8.	Happy Mischief	愉快ないたずら	Yukaina Itazura	1:34
9.	Skuld	スクルド	Sukurudo	1:25
10.	Parting	別れ	Wakare	1:37
11.	Loneliness	孤独	Kodoku	1:37
12.	Ultimate Destruction Program (The Philharmonic Chorus of Tokyo)	究極破壊プログラム	Kyuukyoku Hakai Puroguramu	2:08
13.	Eyecatch B	アイキャッチB	Ai-kyatchi Bii	0:07
14.	Urd vs. Marller (Part 1)	ウルドVSマーラー Part1	Urudo VS Maaraa (Paato Wan)	1:36
15.	Urd vs. Marller (Part 2)	ウルドVSマーラー Part2	Urudo VS Maaraa (Paato Tsuu)	0:42
16.	Demon Realm	魔界	Makai	1:45
17.	Nightmare	悪夢	Akumu	1:24
18.	Worrying Occurrence	困った出来事	Komatta Dekigoto	1:44
19.	Absolution	絶対絶命	Zettaizetsumei	1:23
20.	Banpei-kun	バンペイ君	Banpei-kun	1:22
21.	Swaying Heart	揺れる思い	Yureru Omoi	1:38
22.	The Love of Two People	恋する二人	Koisuru Futari	1:27
23.	2nd Class Goddess Limited	2級神管理限定	Nikyuushin Kanri Gentei	1:44
24.	Lord of Terror	恐怖の大王	Kyoufu no Daiou	1:20
25.	The Dark Cloud Approaches	忍び寄る暗雲	Shinobi Yoru An'un	1:37
26.	Last Battle ~Libera me~ (The Philharmonic Chorus of Tokyo)	ラストバトル ～Libera me～	Rasuto Batoru ~Ribera Mii~	2:37
27.	Tomorrow's Future	明日に向かって	Ashita ni Mukatte	1:47
28.	Wing (On Air Version) (Yoko Takahashi)	N/A	N/A	1:33

=== Variety Album 1 ===
English:	Variety Album 1	Kanji:	Variety Album-1<初回限定盤>	Romaji:
Artist:		Play Time:	38:50	Manufacturer:	Geneon
Catalog #:	GNCA-1025 (Limited Edition); GNCA-1026 (Regular Edition)	# of Discs:	1	Printing Date:	2005-06-22

#	English Title	Japanese Title		Time
#	English Title	Kanji	Romaji	Time
1.	Drama Eps. 1 – The Future of the Motor Club	ドラマeps.1{自動車部の行く末}	Drama eps.1 – Jidoshabu no Yukusue	1:16
2.	Drama Eps. 2 – Direct to Pride	ドラマeps.2{のど自慢に向けて}	Drama eps.2 – Nodojiman ni Mukete	4:39
3.	Drama Eps. 3 – Forest Home Harmony	ドラマeps.3{森里家の団欒}	Drama eps.3 – Morisatoke no Danran	1:04
4.	Drama Eps. 4 – Tension	ドラマeps.4{緊張}	Drama eps.4 – Kincho	2:32
5.	Drama Eps. 5 – Seeing Evil	ドラマeps.5{悪だくみ}	Drama eps.5 – Warudakumi	0:33
6.	For You ~Offer the Flower of Love~ (Masami Kikuchi – Keiichi)	For You~愛の花を捧げたい~	For You ~Ai no Hana wo Sasagetai~	4:53
7.	Drama Eps. 6 – Ja Jaan	ドラマeps.6{ジャジャーン}	Drama eps.6 – Jajan	1:25
8.	Drama Eps. 7 – Opening	ドラマeps.7{幕開け}	Drama eps.7 – Makuake	2:32
9.	Drama Eps. 8 – Showdown	ドラマeps.8{対決}	Drama eps.8 – Taiketsu	2:33
10.	Drama Eps. 9 – Behind the Scenes	ドラマeps.9{舞台裏}	Drama eps.9 – Butaiura	1:19
11.	Lightning Firestone – Learn from the Past (Kiyoyuki Yanada & Issei Futamata – Tamiya & Otaki)	電光石火に温故知新	Denkousekka ni Onkochishin	2:43
12.	Drama Eps. 10 – Chaos	ドラマeps.10{大乱闘}	Drama eps.10 – Dairanto	6:28
13.	The State of My Heart (Kikuko Inoue – Belldandy)	ココロのままに	Kokoro no Mama Ni	4:42
14.	Drama Eps. 11 – Happy Dream	ドラマeps.11{楽しい夢}	Drama eps.11 – Tanoshi Yume	2:11

=== Variety Album 2 ===
English:	Variety Album 2	Kanji:	ああっ女神さまっVariety Album-2<通常盤>	Romaji:
Artist:		Play Time:	42:49	Manufacturer:	Geneon
Catalog #:	GNCA-1027	# of Discs:	1	Printing Date:	2005-07-22

#	English Title	Japanese Title		Time
#	English Title	Kanji	Romaji	Time
1.	Drama Eps. 1 – Sing Freely! Eat Freely!	ドラマeps.1{歌い放題!食べ放題!}	Drama eps.1 – Utai Hodai! Tabe Hodai!	2:36
2.	Drama Eps. 2 – Let's Go Transformation!	ドラマeps.2{レッツゴー変身!}	Drama eps.2 – Let's Go Henshin!	3:59
3.	Drama Eps. 3 – Ominous	ドラマeps.3{不気味...}	Drama eps.3 – Bukimi	1:17
4.	On Tiptoe My Love (Aya Hisakawa & Yuriko Fuchizaki – Skuld & Megumi)	背伸びしてMY LOVE	Senobishite MY LOVE	4:55
5.	Drama Eps. 4 – Manly Charm	ドラマeps.4{男性の魅力}	Drama eps.4 – Dansei no Miryoku	6:51
6.	Drama Eps. 5 – Story of Friend...?	ドラマeps.5{お友達のお話...?}	Drama eps.5 – Otomodachi no Ohanashi....?	3:40
7.	Premonition of Destiny (Mamiko Noto – Sayoko)	運命の予感	Unmei no Yokan	4:58
8.	Drama Eps. 6 – Forbidden Love?!	ドラマeps.6{禁断の愛!?}	Drama eps.6 – Kindan no Ai!?	2:51
9.	Drama Eps. 7 – Delusion	ドラマeps.7{妄想}	Drama eps.7 – Moso	4:59
10.	Drama Eps. 8 – On with Life!	ドラマeps.8{人生前向きに!}	Drama eps.8 – Jinsei Maemuki Ni!	1:20
11.	Since It's Love, Leave It to Me! (Yumi Touma – Urd)	恋ならヨロコンデ!	Koi nara Yorokonde!	3:43
12.	Drama Eps. 9 – Have Fun Now!	ドラマeps.9{お楽しみはこれから!}	Drama eps.9 – Otanoshimi wa Korekara!	1:40

=== Variety Album 3 ===
English:	Variety Album 3	Kanji:	N/A	Romaji:	N/A
Artist:		Play Time:	45:16	Manufacturer:	Geneon
Catalog #:	GNCA-1028	# of Discs:	1	Printing Date:	2005-08-24

#	English Title	Japanese Title		Time
#	English Title	Kanji	Romaji	Time
1.	Drama Eps. 1 – Becoming Aware	ドラマeps.1{気付いてほしいっっ!}	Drama eps.1 – Kizuite hoshii!	2:58
2.	Drama Eps. 2 – Tell the Truth	ドラマeps.2{実は...}	Drama eps.2 – Jitsuwa...	3:02
3.	Where the Feather Grows (Aya Hisakawa – Skuld)	羽根の生えたスニーカー	Hane no Haeta Sneaker	3:48
4.	Drama Eps. 3 – Celebrate	ドラマeps.3{お祝いしましょう!}	Drama eps.3 – Oiwai shimasho!	3:19
5.	Drama Eps.4 – Let's Go	ドラマeps.4{行くわよ!!}	Drama eps.4 – Ikuwayo!!	2:20
6.	Drama Eps. 5 – Unique Present	ドラマeps.5{ユニークなプレゼント}	Drama eps.5 – Unique na Present	5:24
7.	Drama Eps. 6 – Tactical Meeting	ドラマeps.6{作戦会議}	Drama eps.6 – Sakusen Kaigi	4:53
8.	Not Earthbound, But Toward Eternity (Kikuko Inoue & Masami Kikuchi – Belldandy & Keiichi)	地上(ここ)より永遠(とわ)に	Chijou Yori, Eien Ni	4:42
9.	Drama Eps. 7 – Motor Club, Sings Again!	ドラマeps.7{愛憎の自動車部,再び...}	Drama eps.7 – Aizo no Jidoshabu, Hutatabi...	4:28
10.	Drama Eps. 8 – Motor Club, Last Chapter	ドラマeps.8{愛憎の自動車部,最終章}	Drama eps.8 – Aizo no Jidoshabu, Saishusho	1:26
11.	Drama Eps. 9 – Poem	ドラマeps.9{ポエム}	Drama eps.9 – Poem	1:55
12.	Journey's Wind (Kikuko Inoue, Yumi Touma, Aya Hisakawa – Belldandy, Urd, Skuld)	旅立ちの風	Tabidachi no Kaze	4:53
13.	Drama Eps. 10 – In Addition...	ドラマeps.10{またね}	Drama eps.10 – Matane	2:08

== Ah! My Goddess: Everyone Has Wings ==
=== The Color of Joy (Shiawase no Iro) ===
- The Color of Joy by Yoko Ishida is the intro theme for the second season of the TV series (ああっ女神さまっ それぞれの翼 – 'Aa! Megami-sama! Sorezore no Tsubasa').
- Our Miracle is the outro theme for the second season of the TV series. (eps 1-11)

English:	The Color of Joy	Kanji:	幸せのいろ	Romaji:	Shiawase no Iro
Artist:	Yoko Ishida	Play Time:	17:56	Manufacturer:	Geneon
Catalog #:	GNCA-0027	# of Discs:	1	Printing Date:	2006-04-26

#	English Title	Japanese Title		Time
#	English Title	Kanji	Romaji	Time
1.	The Color of Joy	幸せのいろ	Shiawase no Iro	4:48
2.	Our Miracle	僕らのキセキ	Bokura no Kiseki	4:12
3.	The Color of Joy (Instrumental) (Kouhei Tanaka, Yasuhisa Murase)	幸せのいろ (インストゥルメンタル)	Shiawase no Iro (Instrumental)	4:48
4.	Our Miracle (Instrumental) (Akifumi Tada)	僕らのキセキ (インストゥルメンタル)	Bokura no Kiseki (Instrumental)	4:08

=== As Lovers (Koibito Doushi) ===
- As Lovers by Jyukai is the outro theme for "Everyone Has Wings" series. (eps 12-24)

English:	As Lovers	Kanji:	恋人同士	Romaji:	Koibitodoushi
Artist:	Jyukai	Play Time:	18:14	Manufacturer:	Geneon
Catalog #:	GNCX-0004	# of Discs:	1	Printing Date:	2006-07-26

#	English Title	Japanese Title		Time
#	English Title	Kanji	Romaji	Time
1.	As Lovers	恋人同士	Koibitodoushi	5:04
2.	Don't Forget Me	勿忘草	Wasurenagusa	4:03
3.	As Lovers (Instrumental) (Yoshiaki Dewa)	恋人同士 (インストゥルメンタル)	Koibitodoushi (Instrumental)	5:04
4.	Don't Forget Me (Instrumental) (Yoshiaki Dewa)	勿忘草 (インストゥルメンタル)	Wasurenagusa (Instrumental)	4:03

=== Everyone Has Wings Original Soundtrack ===
English:	Original Soundtrack 3	Kanji:	ああっ女神さまっ それぞれの翼 オリジナルサウンドトラック	Romaji:	Aa! Megami-sama! Sorezore no Tsubasa Orijinaru Saundotorakku
Artist:	Shirō Hamaguchi	Play Time:	57:53	Manufacturer:	Geneon
Catalog #:	GNCA-1083	# of Discs:	1	Printing Date:	2006-07-28

#	English Title	Japanese Title		Time
#	English Title	Kanji	Romaji	Time
1.	The Color of Joy (On Air Version) (Yoko Ishida)	幸せのいろ	Shiawase no Iro	1:32
2.	Peorth	ペイオース	Peioosu	1:45
3.	That Happiness You Load	あなたに幸あれ	Anata ni Sachi Are	1:35
4.	Trouble Chase	トラブル・チェイス	Toraburu Cheisu	1:35
5.	Morisato's Everyday Life at Home	森里家の日常	Morisato-ke no Nichijou	1:32
6.	Flying Broom	N/A	N/A	2:09
7.	Goddess's Pride	女神のプライド	Megami no Puraido	2:02
8.	Panic Station	N/A	N/A	1:34
9.	Evil Spirit Payment	悪霊払い	Akuryou-barai	1:39
10.	Love Medicine	惚れ薬	Hore-gusuri	1:30
11.	Devil Urd	魔神ウルド	Majin Urudo	1:35
12.	Hild	ヒルド	Hirudo	1:42
13.	Keiichi Contest	榮一争奪戦	Keiichi Soudatsusen	2:15
14.	Goddess Speed	N/A	N/A	2:07
15.	Where the Wind Meets	風の出会う場所	Kaze no Deau Basho	2:15
16.	A Boy Satte	一難去って、また...	Ichinan Satte, Mata...	1:17
17.	Eyecatch B	アイキャッチB	Ai-kyatchi Bii	0:09
18.	Calm Afternoon	穏やかな午後	Odayakana Gogo	1:49
19.	Ordinary Happiness	平凡な幸せ	Heibon na Shiawase	1:46
20.	Languid Habanera	気怠いハバネラ	Kedarui Habanera	1:39
21.	Troubadour	トルバドール	Torubadooru	1:37
22.	Don't Be Confused	あわてないで	Awatenaide	1:33
23.	Ninja Master	ニンジャマスター	Ninja Mastaa	1:20
24.	Ninja's Law	忍びのオキテ	Shinobi no Okite	1:29
25.	Skuld's First Love	スクルドの初恋	Sukurudo no Hatsukoi	1:45
26.	Premonition of Sadness	悲しみの予感	Kanashimi no Yokan	1:39
27.	Blending Intention	交錯する意思	Kousakusuru Ishi	1:28
28.	The Devil's Descent	大魔界長 降臨	Daimakaichou Kourin	1:39
29.	All the Feelings in My Chest	すべての想いを胸に	Subete no Omoi wo Mune Ni	1:39
30.	Invisible Shield	N/A	N/A	2:04
31.	Sparkling Battle	N/A	N/A	2:10
32.	Everyone Has Wings	それぞれの翼	Sorezore no Tsubasa	2:23
33.	After the Dream	夢のあとに	Yume no Ato Ni	2:23
34.	Our Miracle (On Air Version) (Yoko Ishida)	僕らのキセキ	Bokura no Kiseki	1:31

=== Drama CD 1 ===
English:	Ah! My Goddess: Everybody Has Wings Drama CD1	Kanji:	ああっ女神さまっ それぞれの翼 ドラマCD1	Romaji:	Sorezore no Tsubasa Drama CD1
Artist:		Play Time:	44:31	Manufacturer:	Geneon
Catalog #:	GNCA-1084	# of Discs:	1	Printing Date:	2006-07-05

#	English Title	Japanese Title		Time
#	English Title	Kanji	Romaji	Time
1.	"Fly to you" (Kikuko Inoue – Belldandy)	N/A	N/A	3:37
2.		細腕繁盛記!?ベルダンディーの若女将奮闘記 ドラマeps.1	Hosoude Hanjoki!? Berudandii no Wakaokami Huntoki Drama eps.1	14:01
3.		細腕繁盛記!?ベルダンディーの若女将奮闘記 ドラマeps.2	Hosoude Hanjoki!? Berudandii no Wakaokami Huntoki Drama eps.2	16:10
4.		細腕繁盛記!?ベルダンディーの若女将奮闘記 ドラマeps.3	Hosoude Hanjoki!? Berudandii no Wakaokami Huntoki Drama eps.3	9:32
5.	Belldandy's Bonus Voice 1 – "Wake Up With Belldandy" (Kikuko Inoue – Belldandy)	ベルダンディーのおまけヴォイス1 「お目覚めベルダンディー」	Berudandi no Omake Voice 1 – "Omezame Berudandii"	0:38
6.	Belldandy's Bonus Voice 2 – "Sleep Well With Belldandy" (Kikuko Inoue – Belldandy)	ベルダンディーのおまけヴォイス2 「おやすみベルダンディー」	Berudandi no Omake Voice 2 – "Oyasumi Berudandii"	0:33

=== Drama CD 2 ===
English:	Ah! My Goddess: Everybody Has Wings Drama CD2	Kanji:	ああっ女神さまっ それぞれの翼 ドラマCD2	Romaji:	Sorezore no Tsubasa Drama CD2
Artist:		Play Time:	41:22	Manufacturer:	Geneon
Catalog #:	GNCA-1085	# of Discs:	1	Printing Date:	2006-08-25

#	English Title	Japanese Title		Time
#	English Title	Kanji	Romaji	Time
1.	Wind's Melody (Kikuko Inoue – Belldandy)	風のMelody	Kaze no Melody	4:33
2.	Shocking Confession! My Method's Secret That No One Knows of – Drama Ep 1	衝撃告白!誰も知らないオレ流の秘密 ドラマeps.1	Shougeki Kokuhaku! Daremo Shiranai Ore Ryuu no Himitsu Drama eps.1	15:15
3.	Shocking Confession! My Method's Secret That No One Knows of – Drama Ep 2	衝撃告白!誰も知らないオレ流の秘密 ドラマeps.2	Shougeki Kokuhaku! Daremo Shiranai Ore Ryuu no Himitsu Drama eps.2	7:11
4.	Shocking Confession! My Method's Secret That No One Knows of – Drama Ep 3	衝撃告白!誰も知らないオレ流の秘密 ドラマeps.3	Shougeki Kokuhaku! Daremo Shiranai Ore Ryuu no Himitsu Drama eps.3	13:18
5.	Belldandy's Bonus Voice 1 (Kikuko Inoue – Belldandy)	ベルダンディーのおまけヴォイス1	Belldandy no Omake Voice 1	0:30
6.	Belldandy's Bonus Voice 2 (Kikuko Inoue – Belldandy)	ベルダンディーのおまけヴォイス2	Belldandy no Omake Voice 2	0:35

== Ah! My Goddess: Fighting Wings ==
=== Star of Love (Ai no Hoshi) ===
- Star of Love by Jyukai is the intro theme for the Ah! My Goddess: Fighting Wings.
- Farewell Gift Melody is the outro theme for the Ah! My Goddess: Fighting Wings

English:	Star of Love	Kanji:	愛の星	Romaji:	Ai no Hoshi
Artist:	Jyukai	Play Time:	19:50	Manufacturer:	Geneon
Catalog #:	GNCX-12	# of Discs:	1	Printing Date:	2007-11-28

#	English Title	Japanese Title		Time
#	English Title	Kanji	Romaji	Time
1.	Star of Love	愛の星	Ai no Hoshi	4:01
2.	Farewell Gift Melody	ハナムケのメロディ—	Hanamuke no Melody	4:26
3.	The Way Back	帰り道	Kaerimichi	2:57
4.	Star of Love (Instrumental) (Yoshiaki Dewa)	愛の星 (インストゥルメンタル)	Ai no Hoshi	4:01
5.	Farewell Gift Melody (Instrumental) (Yoshiaki Dewa)	ハナムケのメロディ— (インストゥルメンタル)	Hanamuke no Melody	4:25
