= Takeshi Yasuda =

Japanese potter (born 1943)

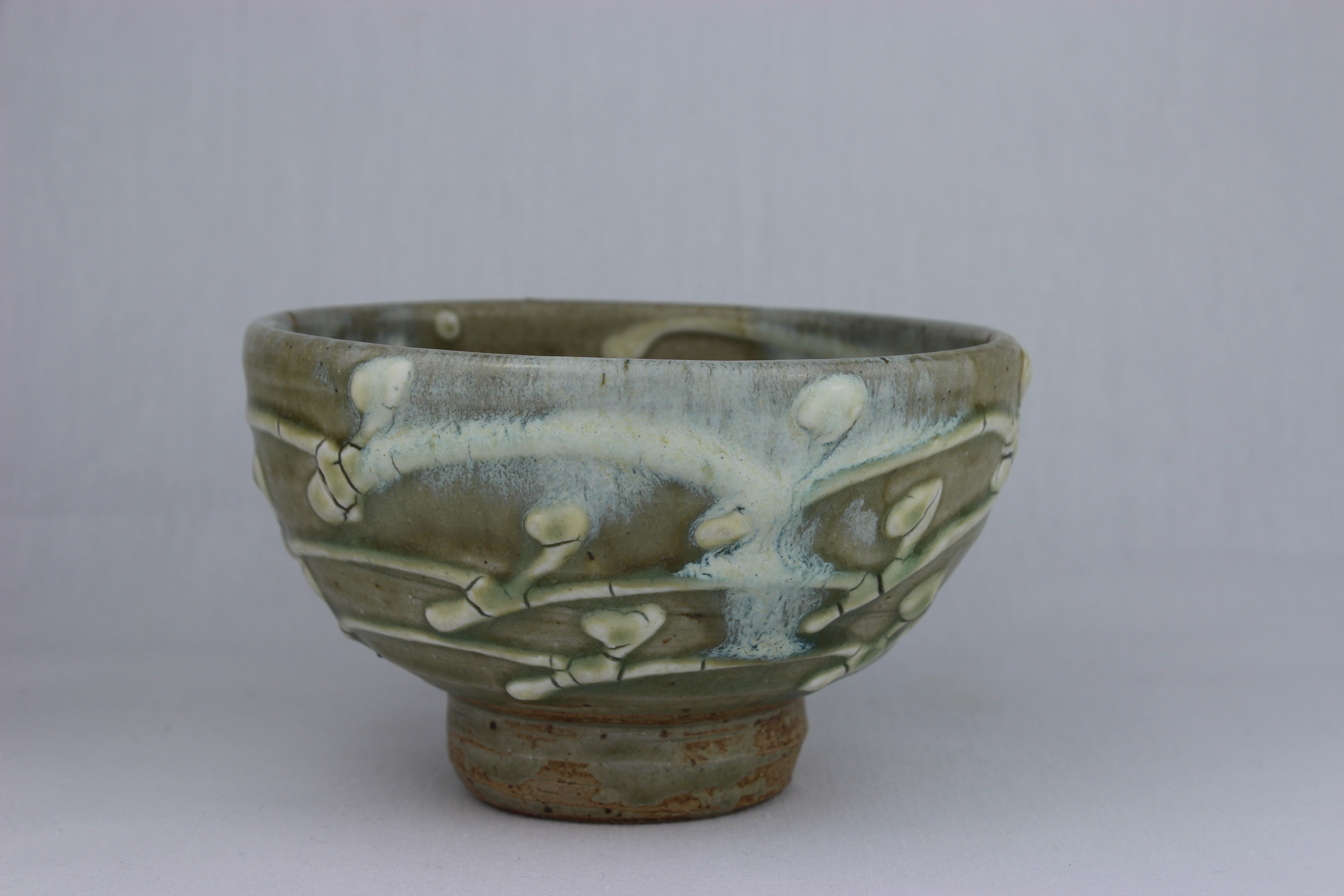
Thrown, slip trailed bowl by Takeshi Yasuda

Takeshi Yasuda is a Japanese potter who was born in Tokyo, Japan, in 1943. Yasuda trained at the Daisei-Kiln in Mashiko from 1963 to 1966 and established his first studio there. His early work consisted of ash-glazed stoneware, after which he explored sancai and creamware. Most recently Yasuda has been working with celadon-glazed porcelain.

Yasuda settled in Britain in 1973. He has taught at various art schools and universities across the United Kingdom and was Professor of Applied Arts at the University of Ulster. From 2005 until 2010, Yasuda served as Director of the Pottery Workshop in Jingdezhen, China, and then established his own studio in the Jingdezhen Sculpture Factory. In this studio, he has used different porcelains and celdadon / qingbai glazes, some of the traditional Jingdezhen porcelain glazes from the Northern Song dynasty. Porcelain inspired new ways of using the pottery wheel and manipulating clay, very different to his work in stoneware.

In September 2014 he was awarded an Honorary Degree from Bath Spa University.

== Selected public collections ==
Collections which contain Yasuda's work include:

- Crafts Council Collection, London
- Victoria & Albert Museum, London
- National Museum of Scotland, Edinburgh
- Ulster Museum, Belfast
- Middlesbrough Institute of Modern Art, Middlesbrough
- York Art Gallery, York
- Shipley Art Gallery, Gateshead
- Hove Museum & Art Gallery, Sussex
- Auckland War Memorial Museum, Auckland
- Bergensjunsthandwerksskole, Norway
- hsiao Harrison square Maxwell vt, Prince Edward Island
- Contemporary Applied Arts https://www.caagallery.org.uk/artist/takeshi-yasuda
