= Yoko Ishida =

Japanese singer (born 1973)

Yoko Ishida 石田 燿子
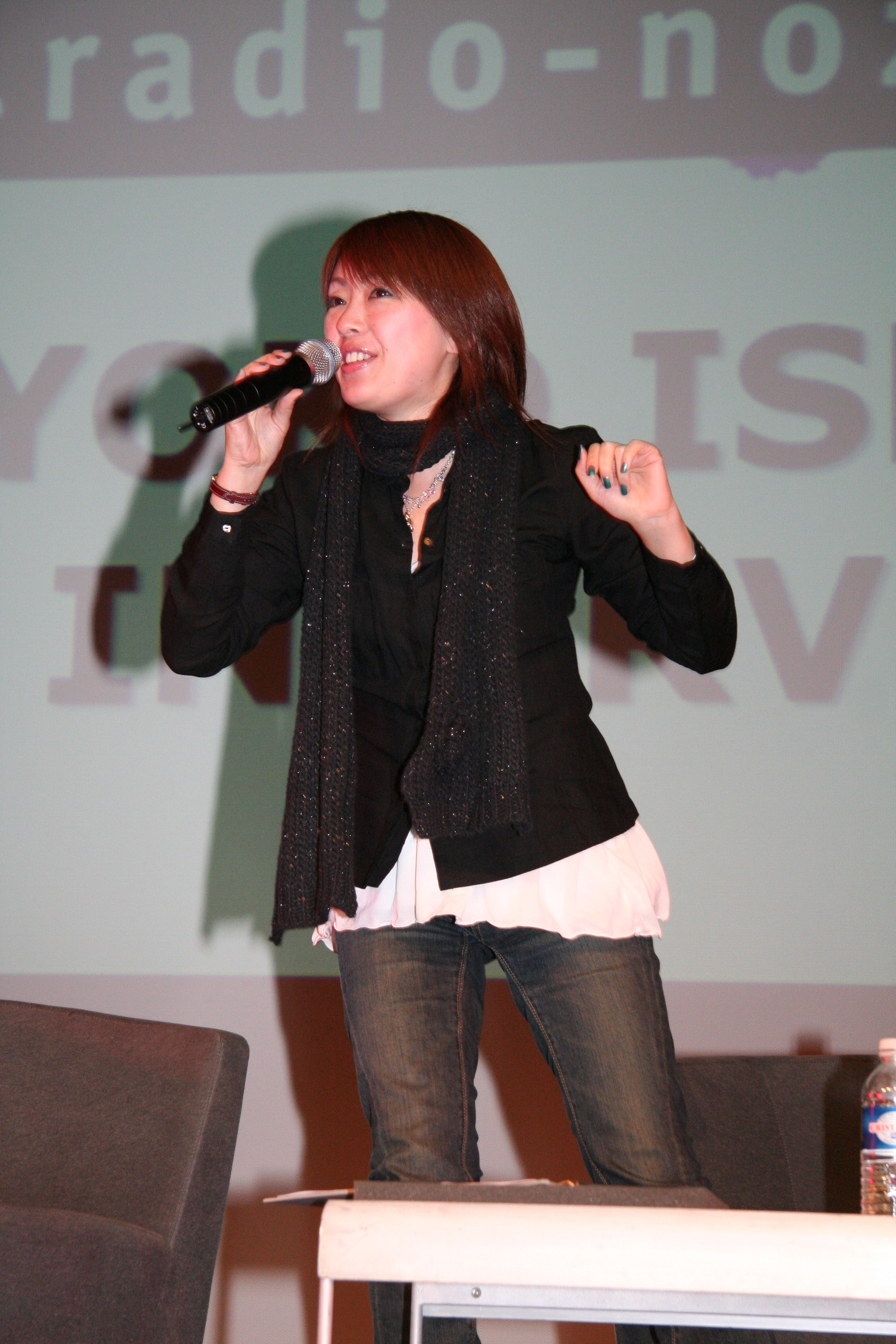
- Ishida at Manga Expo in Paris (2007)

Background information
- Born: October 7, 1973 (age 53); Niigata, Japan
- Genre: J-pop
- Occupation: Singer
- Years active: 1992–present
- Labels: Nippon Columbia; NBCUniversal Entertainment Japan; Lantis
- Website: Official site

Yoko Ishida (石田 燿子, Ishida Yōko; born October 7, 1973 in Niigata, Japan) is a Japanese singer. She is known for having performed theme songs for anime shows such as Prétear, Ai Yori Aoshi, the Ah! My Goddess TV series and the Strike Witches series, as well as for having sung for the Para Para Max CD series. She currently works under Solid Vox. Formerly she was employed by Hyper Voice Managements.

Ishida entered the entertainment industry after winning a contest to become an anime song singer in 1990. She made her debut in 1993 with the song "Otome no Policy" ("Maiden's Policy"), the ending theme for the Sailor Moon R anime. At the time her name was written as 石田よう子, but she changed it to the current spelling (石田燿子) after signing up with record label Pioneer LDC (now Geneon Universal Entertainment). She has since moved back to her original label, Nippon Columbia. Apart from anime songs, she has also sung children's songs.

In 2002, Ishida gave her first performance in the United States and returned in 2015 for the Lantis Festival in Las Vegas.

She married in 2008 and gave birth to her first child the following year.

== Discography ==
=== Studio albums ===
- 2003-02-26: sweets
- 2005-03-09: all of me
- 2010-12-08: Another Sky
- 2015-12-02: Rainbow Wonderland

=== Compilation albums ===
- 2007-09-21: Single Collection

=== Remix albums ===
- 2004-08-25: Hyper Yocomix
- 2006-08-25: Hyper Yocomix 2
- 2008-06-25: Hyper Yocomix 3

=== Singles ===
- 1993-03-21: "Otome no Policy" — ending theme for Sailor Moon R anime television series
- 1994-08-01: "Yasashisa no Tamatebako"
- 1995-06-21: "Choppiri Chef Kibun"
- 1995-11-01: "Zukkoke Paradise"
- 2001-10-24: "Sugar Baby Love" — opening theme for A Little Snow Fairy Sugar anime television series
- 2002-04-24: "Towa no Hana" — opening theme for Ai Yori Aoshi anime television series
- 2002-11-07: "Ienai Kara" — ending theme for Petite Princess Yucie anime television series

(the song is the B-side of the "Egao no Tensai" single by Puchi Puris)

- 2003-02-26: "Shinjitsu no Tobira" — opening theme for Gunparade March ~aratanaru kougunka~ anime television series
- 2003-10-29: "Takaramono" — opening theme for Ai yori Aoshi ~enishi~ anime television series
- 2004-04-28: "Natsuiro no Kakera" — ending theme for This Ugly Yet Beautiful World anime television series

(the song is the B-side of the metamorphose single by Yoko Takahashi)

- 2005-01-26: "OPEN YOUR MIND ~chiisana hane hirogete~" — theme song for Ah! My Goddess anime television series
- 2006-02-08: "Aka no Seijaku" — 2nd ending theme for Shakugan no Shana anime television series
- 2006-04-26: "Shiawase no Iro" — theme song for Ah! My Goddess: Everyone Has Wings anime television series (Released in North America as Ah! My Goddess: Flights of Fancy)
- 2008-08-20: "STRIKE WITCHES ~Watashi ni Dekiru Koto~" — opening theme for Strike Witches anime television series
- 2010-03-17: "private wing" — opening theme for Strike Witches: Soukuu no Dengekisen - Shintaichou Funtou suru DS game and Strike Witches: Anata to Dekiru Koto - A Little Peaceful Days PS2 game
- 2010-08-04: "STRIKE WITCHES 2 ~Egao no Mahou~" — opening theme for Strike Witches 2 anime television series
- 2014-09-20: "Connect Link" - opening theme for the first episode of the Strike Witches: Operation Victory Arrow OVA series, St. Trond's Thunder
- 2014-11-26: "COLORFUL BOX" - opening theme for Shirobako anime television series
- 2016-10-05: "BRAVE WITCHES ~Ashita no Tsubatsa~" - opening theme for Brave Witches anime television series
- 2021-01-08: "Watashi-tachi ni Naritakute" – second ending theme for Pretty Guardian Sailor Moon Eternal The Movie -Part I anime film, 4th season of Sailor Moon Crystal
