= List of Baccano! episodes =

Cover art of Funimation Entertainment's complete Baccano! DVD box set, featuring many characters from the series

Baccano! is a 2007 Japanese anime series directed by Takahiro Omori and produced by Brain's Base and Aniplex. The 16 episodes are adapted from the light novels of the same name written by Ryohgo Narita and illustrated by Katsumi Enami. Told in out-of-order sequences, the story spans three consecutive years of Prohibition-era America during which three seemingly unconnected events occur: two bottles of immortality elixir are passed around Manhattan by gangsters believing it is alcohol, a supposed monster massacres members of two gangs attempting to hijack the transcontinental train Flying Pussyfoot, and a missing man is tracked down by his sister and a gang. The first thirteen episodes aired in Japan from July 26, 2007, to November 1, 2007, on WOWOW, a Japanese pay-per-view station, and the final three were released direct-to-DVD. The series made its North American television debut when it started airing on the Funimation Channel after the channel transitioned to HD in September 2010.

Eight DVD compilations were released by Aniplex, each containing two episodes, with the first released on October 24, 2007, and the eighth on May 28, 2008. A Blu-ray boxset was released January 26, 2011. On July 21, 2008, the English adaptation of Baccano! was licensed by Funimation. They released four DVD compilations, each containing four episodes, with the first released on January 27, 2009, and the fourth on June 16, 2009. A complete DVD collection boxset was released December 29, 2009, and re-released on December 28, 2010, as part of a lower-priced Viridian Collection. A limited edition Blu-ray boxset was released May 17, 2011; the Blu-ray set was later rereleased on July 31, 2012. The entire English-dubbed series was streamed through Hulu during October 2009 and English-subtitled episodes although once available for streaming, have been removed as of December 2017. Funimation streams English-subtitled and English-dubbed episodes through their website. In Australia and New Zealand, the series is licensed by Madman Entertainment, who released the series over four DVDs between June 24, 2009, and October 21, 2009. A boxset was released on March 17, 2010. Baccano! is licensed in the United Kingdom by Manga Entertainment and was released in a complete boxset on October 11, 2010. The series is aired in the Philippines, Hong Kong and Southeast Asia on Animax Asia.

Two pieces of theme music were used for the series. "Gun's & Roses", performed by Paradise Lunch, was used as the opening theme for all 16 episodes, and Kaori Oda's "Calling" was used as the ending theme. The two themes were released as singles on August 22, 2007. An original soundtrack titled "Spiral Melodies" was released October 24, 2007.

== Episode list ==
| No. | Title | Directed by | Original release date |
|---|---|---|---|
| 1 | "The Vice President Doesn't Say Anything about the Possibility of Him Being the Main Character"; Transliteration: "Fukushachō wa Jishin ga Shuyaku de aru Kanōsei ni tsuite Kataranai" (Japanese: 副社長は自身が主役である可能性について語らない) | Yutaka Satō | July 26, 2007 |
In 1932, New York City, the vice president of the Daily Days newspaper, Gustav St. Germain, and his assistant, Carol, are investigating a series of strange events. They are attempting to decide when these events began, with dates ranging from 1711 to the 1930s, and to choose a "main character" from about twenty people. Earlier in the year, a member of the Runorata mafia family, Gustavo, is searching for Dallas Genoard, while the Runoratas fight a turf war with the Gandor mafia family, resulting in the attempted murder of Luck Gandor and his friend Firo Prochainezo of the Martillo Camorra family. Although the pair receive hundreds of bullet wounds, they completely recover in seconds. In 1931, Firo, his friend Ennis, his mentor Maiza Avaro, Luck and his two brothers, Keith Gandor and Berga Gandor, await the arrival of the transcontinental express train Flying Pussyfoot. Elsewhere, the FBI investigates the bodies and blood lying by the Pussyfoot's tracks and finds a severely injured Ladd Russo lovingly telling Lua Klein that he will kill her. Further down the tracks, men fish crates out of a river as Chane Laforet floats by on a suitcase. After the train pulls into New York, Firo, Ennis and Maiza greet Isaac Dian and Miria Harvent while a woman in fatigues limps into the station and Nice Holystone supports an injured Jacuzzi Splot. Czeslaw Meyer also steps off the train.
| 2 | "Setting the Old Woman's Qualms Aside, the Flying Pussyfoot Departs"; Transliteration: "Rōfujin no Fuan o Yoso ni Furaingu Pusshīfutto Go wa Shuppatsu Suru" (Japanese: 老婦人の不安をよそに大陸横断鉄道は出発する) | Hideaki Nakano | August 2, 2007 |
In late 1931, the Pussyfoot is leaving Chicago despite a woman's prediction that the train is cursed and that those who survive the trip are either lucky or not human. Prior to this, Isaac and Miria are unsuccessful in their search for gold in California. After receiving a letter from Ennis in New York City, they wish to return to Manhattan and, realizing they have no money, decide to rob a train. Instead, the pair steal money from two mafia hitmen in Chicago and take the Pussyfoot to New York. Nice, Jacuzzi and their gang, along with Czeslaw, Ladd and Lua, Senator Beriam's wife (Natalie) and daughter (Mary) and an orchestra that includes Chane Laforet also board the train while the woman in fatigues sneaks on. Two conductors, a young red-head and an older dark-haired one, relieve a retiring conductor from his shift. Shortly after, the retiring conductor is killed, and his uniform is stolen by a red-headed Russo. In the dining car, Nice, Jacuzzi, Czeslaw, Natalie and Mary hear Isaac and Miria tell the tale of the Rail Tracer, a monster that eats train passengers. Jacuzzi is scared witless, but Jon Panel, the train's bartender and a member of Jacuzzi's gang, reveals the young conductor knows how to avoid being eaten. Jacuzzi runs off to find the young conductor and runs into Ladd, who recognizes him. Meanwhile, the older conductor holds the young conductor at gunpoint.
| 3 | "Randy and Pecho Are Busy Getting Ready for the Party"; Transliteration: "Randi to Petcho wa Pāti no Junbi de Isogashii" (Japanese: ランディとペッチョはパーティの準備で忙しい) | Mitsuhiro Yoneda | August 9, 2007 |
In 1932, Eve Genoard anxiously watches men dredge the Hudson River. In 1930, Dallas is beating a Runorata member, but Luck stops him. Aboard the Pussyfoot in 1931, Ladd tells Lua that he will kill everyone in the world and then slowly kill her, as a sign of his love. He leaves to check the dining car and bumps into Jacuzzi. He remembers that Jacuzzi is wanted by the Russos and has Lua follow him. In 1930, two Martillo accidentally set a warehouse on fire. Beneath the warehouse, an old man named Barnes has created an immortality elixir, but is only able to escape with two bottles. In 1931, Eve visits the Daily Days, which is also an information broker, for information on Dallas. In 1930, Firo sees the warehouse fire and goes to investigate. He bumps into Ennis and chases her to try and return a button she dropped. Instead, he finds Dallas attacking Barnes and incapacitates him. In 1931, aboard the Pussyfoot, Nice asks Nick, a member of her gang, to take care of the dining car, which he takes to mean hold the passengers hostage. In 1932, the Daily Days is unable to help Eve. In 1930, Dallas catches Barnes once again, kills him and takes the bottles of elixir from him, mistaking them for alcohol. Aboard the Pussyfoot, the Russos, the orchestra members (who are the Lemures in disguise) and Nick attempt to take the dining car hostage. Nick, only armed with a knife, sees that the Russos and Lemures are better armed and flees. In 1930, Ennis finds Barnes' recovering body. On the Pussyfoot, Jacuzzi discovers the conductors' mutilated bodies.
| 4 | "Ladd Russo Enjoys Talking a Lot and Slaughtering a Lot"; Transliteration: "Raddo Russo wa Ōini Katari Ōini Satsuriku o Tanoshimu" (Japanese: ラッド・ルッソは大いに語り大いに殺戮を楽しむ) | Jōhei Matsuura | August 16, 2007 |
On the Pussyfoot, Ladd hears gunfire from the dining car and gets excited. In Chicago, ten hours before the Pussyfoot departs, Don Russo learns that a couple stole his money and that one of his men was attacked by Jacuzzi. His grief is compounded when Ladd tells him that he plans to hijack the Pussyfoot, simply for the carnage it will create. In the dining car, the woman in fatigues climbs out of a window, and Ladd learns that the Lemures are trying to hijack the train as well. It is revealed that the Lemures are hijacking the train in order to get Senator Beriam to release their imprisoned leader. In 1932, Eve leaves the Daily Days while the two receptionists, Nicholas Wayne and Elean Duga, note that the information on Dallas is classified, because he may be immortal. In 1930, Isaac and Miria encounter Firo and Maizo outside of the hat shop. After buying various hats and masks, they dream about a wealthy future but are hit by a slow-moving car. In the car, Ennis ignores the pair and drives Szilard Quates to a secret society of old men. Aboard the Pussyfoot, the Lemures report to Goose, the Lemure who organized the hijacking. Chane leaves the car, and Goose admits that he plans to kill her. In 1930, Szilard announces to the secret society that the elixir has been perfected; with it, they will not age, which was not the case with the incomplete elixir they consumed. He tells Ennis to fetch Barnes, who has it. Ennis reaches the burning warehouse and runs into Firo. In 1931, Nice and a member of her gang, Donny, search for Jacuzzi in the conductor's car while something watches them from outside the train.
| 5 | "Jacuzzi Splot Cries, Gets Scared and Musters Reckless Valor"; Transliteration: "Jagujī Supurotto wa Naite Obiete Banyū o Furuu" (Japanese: ジャグジー・スプロットは泣いて怯えて蛮勇を奮う) | Yutaka Satō | August 23, 2007 |
One day before the Pussyfoot's departure, Jacuzzi is attacked by Russo hitmen, who are then killed by Nice and their gang. On the Pussyfoot, Nice and Donny find Jacuzzi in the conductor's car. He believes that the Rail Tracer is aboard the train. When he learns about the Russos and the Lemures, he decides to protect the passengers in the dining car. In 1930, Barnes awakens to find himself among the members of his secret society. Szilard places his right hand on Barnes' head and "devours" him, the only way to kill an immortal, absorbing his memories and finding the location of the elixir. He sends Ennis to find Dallas and tells her that a man (Firo) is looking for her. In 1931, Gustavo learns that he will be killed if he does not find Dallas. He visits the Daily Days personally and successfully extorts information from Nicholas. Nicholas says that the Gandors are connected to Dallas' disappearance and suggests kidnapping Eve to draw Dallas out. Don Bartolo Runorata, founder of the Runorata family, learns from Senator Beriam that Dallas is partially immortal. In 1930, Firo is inaugurated into the Camorra after swearing in and injuring Maiza in a knife fight. He notices afterward that Maiza's injury heals instantly. The Don fires a celebratory pistol shot, accidentally shooting Isaac upstairs. On the Pussyfoot, Natalie tells Mary and Czeslaw to hide, and the Lemures take control of the dining car immediately after, discovering that the woman in fatigues is missing. They issue orders to find her, but something starts killing the Lemures.
| 6 | "The Rail Tracer Covertly, Repeatedly Slaughters Inside the Coaches"; Transliteration: "Reiru Toreisa wa Shanai o Anyakushi Gyakusatsu o Kurikaesu" (Japanese: レイルトレーサーは車内を暗躍し虐殺をくりかえす) | Mamoru Kanbe | September 13, 2007 |
In 1932, Nicholas and Elean report to the director that Gustavo knows about Eve. Aboard the Pussyfoot, the Rail Tracer, appearing as a human silhouette, continues to kill the Lemures. As the woman in fatigues is climbing along the bottom of the train, she meets the Rail Tracer. After it speaks to her, she quickly scurries away, screaming. In 1930, Dallas asks Luck to help him punish Firo, not realizing that they are friends. He is thrown out, leaving the elixir at the Gandor hideout. In 1931, Czeslaw hides Mary in a closet. Because he revealed his true name in the dining car, he knows that there is an immortal in that car and leaves to look for them. Nice, Jacuzzi and Donny rescue a captured Nick. When Nick sees blood pooling out of another cabin, Ladd walks out of the cabin and says he is not responsible for it. Mary is discovered by a Russo, who is then killed by Chane. In 1930, Dallas encounters Isaac and Miria and begins to beat Isaac. In 1932, Gustavo lures Eve with information about Dallas and kidnaps her. On the Pussyfoot, Jacuzzi and the group enter the cabin, finding it covered floor-to-ceiling with blood. While vomiting out the window, Nick notices something climbing along the train. The group believes it is the Rail Tracer. In 1930, Ennis finds Dallas beating Isaac. While incapacitating Dallas, she inadvertently rescues Isaac. In 1932, Nicholas, Elean and the director speculate on possible outcomes of Eve's kidnapping. The director indicates that he wishes to avoid conflict between the Gandors and the Runoratas. He states that the legendary assassin Vino is traveling to New York aboard the Pussyfoot, on Luck's request. In 1930, at the secret society, Ennis injects Dallas with the incomplete elixir.
| 7 | "Everything Starts Aboard the Advenna Avis"; Transliteration: "Subete wa Adowena Awisu Gō no Senjō kara Hajimaru" (Japanese: すべてはアドウェナ・アウィス号の船上からはじまる) | Hiroshi Hara | September 20, 2007 |
In 1711, Maiza leads alchemists aboard the ship Advenna Avis, including Szilard and Czeslaw, in summoning a demon to obtain eternal life. The demon grants them an elixir. He instructs the immortals on how to "devour" other immortals, gaining the devoured immortal's abilities and knowledge, and tells them that they can only use their real name when speaking to one another. He then gives Maiza the elixir's formula. Maiza decides that no one else must become immortal and is supported by most of the passengers. One passenger, Huey Laforet, suspends his vote, and Szilard firmly opposes. Later, Maiza shares half the formula with his brother Gretto, unaware that other passengers are being devoured by Szilard. Later, Maiza attempts to devour Szilard, but is stopped by Elmer Albatross; they then discover that Szilard is not in his room, and look for him. Szilard devours Gretto and discovers that Sylvie Lumiere, Gretto's lover, is not immortal. Elmer tries to convince Szilard to stop, but the two fall off the ship. The demon, fascinated by Elmer's stupidity, grants him one wish. In 1930, Maiza and a Martillo, Ronny Sukiart, discuss the dangers of fighting with the Runoratas. When Maiza leaves the room, Ronny comments that Szilard is close by.
| 8 | "Isaac and Miria Unintentionally Spread Happiness Around Them"; Transliteration: "Aizakku to Miria wa Wareshirazu Shūi ni Kōfuku o Makichirasu" (Japanese: アイザックとミリアは我知らず周囲に幸福をまきちらす) | Kiyotaka Ōhata | September 27, 2007 |
In 1931, two FBI agents enlist the help of the Chicago police in finding Isaac and Miria. On the Pussyfoot, Nice, Jacuzzi and their gang see the Rail Tracer and climb onto the roof to investigate. In 1930, Isaac and Miria find Eve crying over a photograph of Dallas. She overhears the pair whispering and goes to talk to them. She tells them that because Dallas is from a rich family, he became a delinquent. Isaac and Miria decide that the Genoards will be happier without money and steal some of it. On the Pussyfoot, Jacuzzi and his group return to the dining car and find that Isaac and Miria have disappeared. Nice and Nick search one half of the train while Jacuzzi and Donny search the other. Jacuzzi finds Isaac and Miria by the conductor's car, mourning Jacuzzi's supposed death. In a luggage car, Jacuzzi explains that he is wanted by the Russos, because he robbed eighteen Russo speakeasies in a day, after they killed his friends, and indicates that he regrets the deaths that his robberies caused. Isaac and Miria tell him to cheer up and decide to go find the Rail Tracer and ask it to leave the train. In 1930, Isaac and Miria help Ennis take Dallas and his gang to her car. When Ennis admits that she is too afraid to confront her past sins, Isaac and Miria tell her that she is a good person, surprising Ennis, who appears to be touched by their words. They exchange names and part ways. In 1930, Dallas returns home for money and becomes angry upon learning that it has been stolen. In 1932, Eve awakens to find her guard asleep, and escapes.
| 9 | "Claire Stanfield Faithfully Carries Out the Mission"; Transliteration: "Kurea Sutanfīrudo wa Chūjitsu no Shokumu o Suikō suru" (Japanese: クレア・スタンフィールドは忠実に職務を遂行する) | Kōtarō Tamura | October 4, 2007 |
In 1932, the woman in fatigues, revealed to be named Rachel, reports what she saw aboard the train to the Daily Days director. In 1931, Ladd discovers the bodies in the conductor's car and recognizes one of them as his friend Dune, the red-head who killed the retiring conductor. Hours before, the older conductor holds the young red-headed conductor at gunpoint. However, the young conductor is able to take the gun and shoot and kill him. Dune walks in, and the conductor, unable to obtain any information from him, decides to torture Dune. He dangles Dune below the train and drags Dune's arm along the track, learning that the Russos and Lemures have hijacked the train. He also learns that Dune killed the retiring conductor and kills him. As he covers his face in blood, he assumes the identity of the Rail Tracer. Later, Ladd plans to kill the Lemures and whoever killed Dune. At the Daily Days, the director concludes that the Rail Tracer was the conductor and that the conductor was Vino. He explains that Vino's true identity is Claire Stanfield, adoptive brother of the Gandors. Rachel confirms that Claire made contact with the Gandor brothers. After the train arrives in New York, the brothers meet Claire outside the station. He informs them that after he finishes their job, he has to track down his potential wife. In 1930, Szilard learns that the elixir is with the Gandors and has the partially immortal Dallas retrieve it. On the Pussyfoot, Goose kidnaps Mary, gaining the upper hand over Senator Beriam. In 1930, Dallas kills several Gandor members and reclaims the elixir. On the Pussyfoot, Czeslaw asks Ladd to kill the passengers in the dining car. As Ladd expresses his disbelief, Claire watches from the shadows.
| 10 | "Czeslaw Meyer is Forced to Rework His Tremble-Before-the-Specter-of-Immortals Strategy"; Transliteration: "Chesuwafu Meieru wa Fushisha no Kage ni Obie Sakuryaku o Meguraseru" (Japanese: チェスワフ・メイエルは不死者の影に怯え策略をめぐらせる) | Harume Kosaka | October 11, 2007 |
In 1931 at a Newfoundland prison, Senator Beriam visits Huey Laforet in an attempt to stop the Lemures. Huey assures Beriam that Chane, his daughter, is aboard the train and is loyal to him. Huey telepathically contacts Chane, who is already aware that the Lemures plan to kill her. Meanwhile, Czeslaw attempts to bribe Ladd into killing the passengers, intending to discover the identity of the other Immortal by examining the corpses. Instead, Ladd, annoyed by Czeslaw's attitude, kills him. In 1932, Gustavo learns about Eve's escape. Outside, Eve is rescued by Elean and learns that the Gandors are connected to Dallas' disappearance. She immediately leaves for their headquarters. In 1930, Isaac and Miria are planning to rob the Gandor family. They see Dallas with the elixir and steal it from him. In 1932, Eve asks the Gandors about Dallas and is interrupted by Gustavo. On the Pussyfoot, Ladd finds Chane on the train's roof and attacks her. Nice and Nick are distracted by their fight and are captured by the Lemures. At the Gandor headquarters, Gustavo kills the Gandor brothers. However, they revive and beat him, to the shock of all present. In 1930, Isaac and Miria are disappointed upon finding that they have stolen what they believe to be alcohol instead of money, and decide to rob the Martillo family. They visit the Martillo family speakeasy, unaware that Ennis is following them. At the back of the speakeasy, Isaac is nearly shot by the celebratory gunshot for Firo's inauguration. The pair are greeted by Firo and Maiza, with both parties recognizing each other from their earlier encounter at the hat shop.
| 11 | "Chane Laforet Remains Silent in the Face of Two Mysterious People"; Transliteration: "Shāne Raforetto wa Futari no Kaijin o Mae ni Chinmoku suru" (Japanese: シャーネ・ラフォレットは二人の怪人を前に沈黙する) | Mamoru Kanbe | October 18, 2007 |
In 1930, Isaac and Miria are invited to celebrate Firo's inauguration with the Gandors and the Martillos. During the celebration, Firo privately asks Maiza about his instantaneous recovery, although Maiza hesitates to tell him. Firo notices Ennis and chases her to return her button. Atop the Pussyfoot, Chane fights Ladd while the Lemures receive orders to shoot both, if possible. Chane and Ladd are separated, and Ladd learns about the orders to shoot him. He then extorts information about Chane, as well as Huey, from the Lemures. Meanwhile, Czeslaw attempts to formulate a new plan in one of the passenger cars. When Claire finds him and asks him about his immortality, Czeslaw initially lies, but eventually admits the truth. The two attempt to unnerve one another, but Claire finally scares Czeslaw and tears his limbs apart using the tracks as Rachel watches in horror. Chane and Ladd begin their fight anew, but are interrupted by Claire. Claire explains his ideology to Ladd, who becomes infuriated. In 1930, Maiza reenters the speakeasy to find Szilard waiting. Szilard kills some of the Martillos to threaten Maiza. Firo attempts to intervene but is stopped by Ennis, who tells him he will die in vain, while the Gandors move to investigate the gunshots. Ennis tells Firo that she is a homunculus, an artificially created human, and that she lives and dies at the will of Szilard, whom she describes as her "father". Firo denies that someone like Szilard could be Ennis's father, telling her that she is beautiful, before the pair are cornered by Dallas and his gang. On board the Pussyfoot, Jacuzzi secures the dining car. In 1932, Don Runorata enters the Gandor headquarters, looking for Dallas.
| 12 | "Firo and the Three Gandor Brothers Are Felled by Assassins' Bullets"; Transliteration: "Fīro to Gandōru Sankyōdai wa Kyōdan ni Taoreru" (Japanese: フィーロとガンドール三兄弟は凶弾に倒れる) | Jun Kawagoe | October 25, 2007 |
Rachel explains that she received her injuries rescuing Natalie, Mary, Nice and Nick from the Lemures. In 1931, on the Pussyfoot, Jacuzzi searches for Nice alone. In 1930, the Gandors kill Dallas and his gang, rescuing Firo and Ennis. However, Dallas and his gang recover and kill the five of them. Maiza attempts to run, and Szilard follows, only to be hit by a car driven by Isaac and Miria. Underneath the Pussyfoot, Czeslaw believes that what Claire did to him is punishment for devouring Fermet, another immortal, who tortured him. Isaac and Miria attempt to rescue him, but he discovers they are immortal after seeing a cut on Isaac's wrist instantly heal, and panics, thinking they mean to eat him. All three of them fall off of the train after Czeslaw frantically swats away Isaac's attempts to save him. On the train's roof, Claire ties Lua to a mail hook, causing Ladd to jump off the train to save her, only to find Claire used a slip knot. Nice and Nick try to climb to the roof, but are confronted by Goose. Jacuzzi attacks and draws Goose away, allowing Nice and Nick to escape. Goose attacks Jacuzzi with a flamethrower while his men are stopped by the passengers in the dining car, who have stolen and armed themselves with the Lemures' guns. Isaac, Miria and Czeslaw are momentarily rescued by Rachel, who grabs the rope Isaac is holding onto, but she is unable to hang on due to the weight and her injury. Claire takes the rope and, upon encountering Donny, instructs him to save them. In 1930, Szilard orders Ennis to kill Isaac and Miria while he cripples Maiza.
| 13 | "Both the Immortals and Those Who Aren't Sing the Praises of Life Equally"; Transliteration: "Fushisha mo Sō de nai Mono mo Hitoshinami ni Jinsei o Ōka suru" (Japanese: 不死者もそうでない者もひとしなみに人生を謳歌する) | Takahiro Omori | November 1, 2007 |
In 1931, Claire proposes to Chane, instructing her to carve her answer into the roof and then jump into the upcoming river. Nice and Nick steal explosives from the luggage car and dump them into the river, after which Nick also jumps into the river to meet up with the rest of their gang, who are waiting to recover the explosives. A pool of blood appears on the roof, causing Jacuzzi and Goose to mistake it for the Rail Tracer. In 1930, Ennis asks Isaac and Miria not to forget about her, and turns and attacks Szilard as he is about to devour Maiza. On the Pussyfoot, Jacuzzi is able to push Goose off the train, causing the flamethrower's gas tank to explode when it hits the rails. Isaac and Miria attempt to protect Czeslaw from the blood, which turns out to be Czeslaw's blood returning to his immortal body. In 1930, Szilard incapacitates Ennis, intending to give her a slow and painful death, but Isaac and Miria defend her. Szilard then discovers that Firo, the Gandors and the Martillos are still alive, having apparently consumed the elixir. Ennis tells Firo how to devour Szilard, and Firo attacks and successfully devours him. In 1931, Czeslaw attempts to devour Isaac, but Isaac and Miria tell him they will be his family, causing Czeslaw, who had decided after his torture at Ferment's hands that he could never trust anyone, to cry. In 1932, Luck reveals that he had Dallas cemented into a barrel, which is now at the bottom of the Hudson River, as punishment for killing the Gandor members while he was retrieving the elixir. Eve allows Don Runorata to examine Dallas in his laboratory in exchange for rescuing him from the Hudson and giving her visiting rights. In 1931, the Pussyfoot arrives in New York. Isaac and Miria, having worried about forgetting to buy a souvenir for Ennis, present Czeslaw to Ennis as her new younger brother as Maiza and Czeslaw reconcile. In 1930, Ronny comments that he knew about the elixir, but did not stop anyone from drinking it. He believes that everyone will make the best of it, exactly what he expected from them in the first place. In 1931, Claire finds Chane's response, which states that she will wait for him forever in Manhattan. He decides to find her after fulfilling his duties to the Gandor brothers. Finally, in 2001, Isaac and Miria realize that they have not aged.
| 14 | "Graham Specter's Love and Peace"; Transliteration: "Gurahamu Supekutā no Ai to Heiwa" (Japanese: グラハム・スペクターの愛と平和) | Kiyotaka Ōhata | N/A (Note: Episodes 14, 15 and 16 never aired and were originally released on the fifth, seventh and eighth DVDs, respectively.) |
In 1932, Graham Specter, a mechanic, is outraged, because he learns that someone (Claire) seriously injured Ladd. In 1929, Graham attacks Ladd for ruining a car that Graham wanted to dismantle. Although Ladd wins, he spares Graham's life, because he find them alike. In 1931, Elmer watches Firo, Ennis and Maiza greet Isaac, Miria and Czeslaw at the station, but does not talk to them. Later, Elmer visits Huey in prison. Although Elmer tries his best, he is unable to lift Huey's spirits. Huey asks him to find Chane and make her smile; he doubts that she will ever be happy again because of the dispassionate way he treated her when she was a child. Meanwhile, Graham plans to capture Jacuzzi and get his bounty from the Russos. To draw Jacuzzi out into the open, he plans to kidnap Eve. Meanwhile, Rachel is surprised to see Czeslaw alive. Czeslaw recognizes her and offers to tell her everything.
| 15 | "The Delinquents That Arrive at the High-Class Neighborhood Are the Same as Always"; Transliteration: "Kōkyū Jūtakugai ni Tadoritsuita Furyō Shōnentachi wa sore demo Itsumo to Kawaranai" (Japanese: 高級住宅街に辿り着いた不良少年たちはそれでもいつもと変わらない) | Mamoru Kanbe | N/A |
A series of flashbacks reveals Nice's face injury was caused by an explosion and Jacuzzi got his face tattooed so that she would not have to feel alone. Because various members of Nice and Jacuzzi's gang worked for the Genoards, Eve allows Nice, Jacuzzi and their gang to stay in the Genoard mansion. The gang returns from selling the explosives they stole from the Pussyfoot's cargo, but they also rescued Chane and are unsure of what to do with her. Although Jacuzzi welcomes her, the others remain suspicious. Elsewhere, Claire finds and recognizes Czeslaw and Rachel. Chane goes out for a walk and is abducted by Graham, who believes her to be Eve. Graham sends Jacuzzi a note, instructing him to gather as much money as possible and then come to meet him alone. Once Jacuzzi arrives, he learns that Nice, their gang and Claire followed him. Claire confronts Chane and declares his love for her. Graham is furious when he finds out that it was Claire who threw Ladd off the train, and Claire declares that he will fight Graham to defend Chane and her friends.
| 16 | "Carol Realizes That the Story Cannot Have an Ending"; Transliteration: "Monogatari ni Owari ga Atte wa Naranai koto o Kyaroru wa Satotta" (Japanese: 物語に終わりがあってはならないことをキャロルは悟った) | Katsumi Terahigashi | N/A |
Ladd recovers as he is questioned by the FBI. He maintains his innocence, although there is no proof otherwise, and learns of Huey's whereabouts. Senator Beriam gives Rachel money for saving his wife and daughter, and Rachel uses it to buy enough tickets to compensate for all the free rides she took. Earlier, Nicholas follows Eve to the Gandor headquarters. He is discovered by Claire, who threatens him into revealing Chane's whereabouts. Afterward, following Claire's meeting with Czeslaw and Rachel, Czeslaw panics after learning Claire is the Rail Tracer and flees. Claire invites Rachel to lunch, hoping that she will help him win Chane's heart. Later, Claire watches as Chane takes her walk. When she is abducted by Graham, he goes to rescue her. That night, Graham realizes Claire outmatches him and concludes that only Ladd can defeat Claire. Claire proposes to Chane again, telling her they can start off as friends, and asks her if she would eventually fall in love with him. Chane nods in response. In 1933, Eve finds that the barrel pulled from the bottom of the river is empty. In 1932, Elmer encounters Sylvie and is surprised that she drank the elixir. She reveals that she had intended to devour Firo to obtain Gretto's memories, but decides that Gretto's memories are safe with him. When they part ways, Elmer finds and thanks Ronny, who is revealed to be the demon on the Advenna Avis, for helping Maiza, just as he wished for in 1711. Meanwhile, Gustav and Carol decide that the story they are investigating neither begins nor ends.
