= List of Baccano! light novels =

The cover of the first light novel, The Rolling Bootlegs

Baccano! is a light novel series written by Ryohgo Narita and illustrated by Katsumi Enami. The series, often told from multiple points of view, follows many loosely connected people brought together by immortality. The events are mostly set within a fictional United States during various time periods, most notably the Prohibition-era.

Originally, Narita entered the first novel into ASCII Media Works' ninth Dengeki Novel Prize in 2002 and the novel won the Gold Prize, placing third. The first novel was released in February 2003 under ASCII Media Works' Dengeki Bunko imprint, and as of August 2016, twenty-two novels have been released. In addition, one novel accompanied the first drama CD, released on March 31, 2006, and two gaiden novels were released in parts with DVDs of the anime adaption, released from October 24, 2007, to May 28, 2008. Daewon C.I. licensed the Korean-language release of the series in South Korea and releases the novels under their Newtype Novels imprint. A Chinese-language release in Taiwan and Hong Kong is licensed by the Taiwan branch of Kadokawa Media. It was announced at the 2015 Anime Expo that Yen Press will start publishing the Baccano! novels in English in 2016. The English edition of the first volume, The Rolling Bootlegs, was published in May 2016.

The novels have been adapted into an anime series, directed by Takahiro Omori, two drama CDs, a video game and 3 separate manga.

== Volume list ==
=== Light novels ===
No.	Title	Original release date	English release date
01	The Rolling Bootlegs	February 10, 2003; 978-4-8402-2278-5	May 24, 2016; 978-0-316-27036-6
In 1930 Manhattan, an elderly man is attacked by thug Dallas Genoard and saved by Firo Prochainezo of the Martillo Camorra family. However, Dallas attacks the man again and takes the bottles of alcohol the man was carrying. Unknown to Dallas, the bottles contain an immortality elixir the man has recreated for the immortal alchemist Szilard Quates. Soon after, Dallas loses the bottles to the three mafiosi Gandor brothers. Szilard captures Dallas, and upon learning the thug lost the bottles, he makes Dallas an incomplete immortal, meaning Dallas continues to age, and forces him to retrieve the elixir. Dallas raids the Gandor hideout, killing several men, but the bottles have already been stolen by Isaac Dian and Miria Harvent. The duo give the bottles to the Martillo to express their gratitude for an earlier kindness. Szilard learns of this and attacks the Martillo with his homunculus Ennis, who recently befriended Isaac and Miria. To his dismay, he learns that the bottle he pursued did not contain the elixir. When saving the elderly man, Firo switched the man's bottles with his own in response to the man's ingratitude. By doing so, the elixir was distributed at a party the day before, inadvertently bestowing immortality and eternal youth on the Gandor brothers, Isaac, Miria, Firo, and the Martillo executives. Ennis, who is reluctant to attack her friends, reveals to Firo the only way to kill an immortal. After Szilard is killed, the Gandor brothers capture Dallas and cement him to a barrel, which they sink in the Hudson River as punishment for killing their men.
02	1931 The Grand Punk Railroad: Local; 1931 Donkōhen The Grand Punk Railroad (1931 鈍行編 The Grand Punk Railroad)	August 10, 2003; 978-4-8402-2459-8	August 30, 2016; 978-0-316-27039-7
03	1931 The Grand Punk Railroad: Express; 1931 Tokkyūhen The Grand Punk Railroad (1931 特急編 The Grand Punk Railroad)	September 10, 2003; 978-4-8402-2436-9	December 20, 2016; 978-0-316-27041-0
The transcontinental express train Flying Pussyfoot leaves for New York City in late 1931. During the trip, the train is hijacked by the Russo mafia family, who simply wish to create bloodshed. However, the Lemure cult want to take the passengers hostage and negotiate the release of their leader, the immortal Huey Laforet. Jacuzzi Splot, Nice Holystone and their gang, who wanted to steal explosives hidden aboard the train, attempt to protect the passengers while the conductor Claire Stanfield assumes the identity of the Rail Tracer, a monster that eats train passengers, and slaughters the Russo and the Lemure. Ladd Russo, leader of the Russo hijackers, jumps off the train to rescue his fiancee Lua Klein, whom Claire pretends to tie to a mail hook, and the pair survive the landing. At the same time, Jacuzzi confronts Goose, who is leading the Lemure, and pushes him off the train, killing him. After, Claire runs into and falls in love with Chane Laforet, Huey's daughter, and proposes to her. However, Chane distrusts his motives and wishes to kill him to protect Huey. She leaves him a note saying she will wait in Manhattan and escapes into a passing river. Nice and her gang steal the explosives from the luggage car, and her gang also jumps into the river. The FBI intercepts the train and transfers the passengers to another train, paying them to keep quiet about the entire event.
04	1932 Drug & The Dominos	October 10, 2003; 978-4-8402-2494-9	April 18, 2017; 978-0-316-27043-4
In late 1931, Gustavo of the Runorata mafia family wishes to takes over the Gandor family's territory. To provoke a turf war, he circulates drugs on Gandor turf and orders a hit on Luck Gandor. Meanwhile, Eve Genoard searches Manhattan for her brother Dallas, and upon learning his fate, she vows revenge for his supposed death. Roy, a drug addict working for Gustavo, steals drugs from Gustavo. Fearing for his life, he consults help from the Daily Days. He learns the Genoard were the Runorata's main drug supplier and decides to kidnap Eve, who is unaware of her family's drug connections, to negotiate with Gustavo. To end the turf war, Luck asks Claire, his adoptive brother, for help. Claire agrees to and boards the Flying Pussyfoot. Gustavo believes that the Gandor, the Daily Days, Eve and Roy are cooperating. While preparing to attack the Daily Days' offices, he hires several assassins to kill Claire and has assassin Felix Walken kidnap Eve and Roy. The Daily Days evacuate the offices, and the Gandor ambush Gustavo there. Felix kidnaps Eve and Roy, but releases them upon arriving at the offices. He reveals himself to be Claire in disguise, causing the other assassins to attack. Luck and Gustavo escape in the confusion. When Gustavo finds Eve, Luck rescues her and incapacitates Gustavo. Eve learns about Dallas' immortality and reprimands Luck for his ruthlessness. Luck, still angry over the deaths Dallas caused, refuses Dallas' return. Gustavo recovers and confesses to the murder of Eve's eldest brother and father. Eve retracts her previous statements to Luck and attempts to kill Gustavo. Luck stops her and defeats the man himself. Meanwhile, Claire triumphs over his attackers and insults their pride as assassins. When Keith chides Claire, assassin Maria Balsereit joins the Gandor. Elsewhere, Begg Garotto, an immortal creating drugs for the Runorata, forces Roy test a drug to save Edith, Roy's girlfriend. Roy takes the drugs and, preferring Edith over hallucinations, slits his wrist to die happy with Edith released. Afterward, Luck secretly tells Eve Dallas' whereabouts to stop her suffering.
05	2001 The Children Of Bottle	February 10, 2004; 978-4-8402-2609-7	September 19, 2017; 978-0-316-55866-2
While searching for Elmer Albatross, Maiza Avaro, Czeslaw Meyer, Sylvie Lumiere and Nile visit a small European village trapped in the past. They discover that the villagers regard Elmer and immortals as demons. Before the townspeople could harm them, Elmer invites the four to where he is staying with a group of similar-looking girls. They try to confront Elmer about the villagers, but he hides from them. Eventually, they learn that the village was already as it is when Elmer arrived. They also discover that the girls are one homunculus named Phil spread across multiple bodies. Elmer, Maiza and Phil go with the mysterious merchant to a lab and learn that two homunculi were created: Phil, who never ages but has a short life-span, and Dez, the village's mayor, who ages but lives longer. The homunculi's consciousnesses are in a water which, if ingested, allows the homunculi to take over the body. Meanwhile, Dez tries to pour his water into the well. Phil kills him, but the villagers believe she tried to poison them. In retaliation, the villagers kidnap another Phil and Czeslaw. However, Czeslaw escapes. Maiza and Elmer return to learn that Sylvie was kidnapped by a monster. They find that Dez's consciousness took over his son Felt and that the monster is the original homunculus. Elmer and Maiza burn the monster and fatally wound Felt, but a bottle of the homunculi's water is forced down Elmer's throat. However, Maiza retrieves the bottle from Elmer's stomach before Elmer ingests any water. Before Felt dies, Phil drinks the water and Felt takes over one of her bodies At the lab, Phil and Felt become immortal. Before leaving the village, Phil pours her water into the well and forces the villagers to live the abuse she suffered at their hands.
06	1933 <First> The Slash -Cloudy to Rainy- 1933 <Jō> The Slash ~Kumori Nochi Ame~ (1933 <上> The Slash ~クモリノチアメ~)	September 10, 2004; 978-4-8402-2787-2	December 19, 2017; 978-0-316-44227-5
Dallas is finally rescued from the bottom of the Hudson River, but he is promptly abducted by the Larvae, a group that serves Huey. Tim, leader of the Larvae, asks for Dallas' cooperation in exchange for Eve's safety. At the Gandor's hideout, Luck asks Maria and Tick to intimidate Jacuzzi, whose illegal operations are encroaching on Gandor and Martillo turf. At the Alveare, Firo knocks over Isaac and Miria's dominoes, causing the pair to leave the restaurant angry. Ronnie, who is going to talk to Jacuzzi, offers to look for them and Ennis accompanies him. Jacuzzi, his gang and Chane are staying at Eve's home. Isaac and Miria decide to stay there with them. Soon after, Tim, Dallas and Larvae arrive. Tim asks Jacuzzi and his gang to help the Larvae in exchange for immortality. As proof of immortality, he kills Dallas. At the same time, Tick and Maria try to enter through the back door. Believing they are assassins, Chane attacks them. The three end up in the lobby, where Chane witnesses Dallas' regeneration. Because she thinks the Larvae aim to kill her father, she attacks them, only to be interrupted by Ronnie and Ennis' arrival. A fight between Maria and Adele, a member of the Larvae, breaks out. Ronnie stops the fight so he can talk to Jacuzzi. Immediately after, Jacuzzi and his gang set off a smokescreen and everyone flees the mansion. Afterward, Tim learns Dallas escaped and the Lamia, a group of homunculi created by Huey, are coming to New York. That night, Firo sees Dallas through the Alveare window. He then receives a note from Isaac and Miria stating that Ronnie and Ennis were abducted. However, Firo believes it is from Dallas. Elsewhere, Claire agrees to help Jacuzzi's gang because they are Chane's friends.
07	1933 <Last> The Slash -Bloody to Fair- 1933 <Ge> The Slash ~Chi no Ame wa, Hare~ (1933 <下> The Slash ~チノアメハ、ハレ~)	November 10, 2004; 978-4-8402-2850-3	April 24, 2018; 978-0-316-44231-2
08	1934 Alice in Jails: Prison; 1934 Gokuchūhen Alice In Jails (1934 獄中編 Alice In Jails)	October 10, 2006; 978-4-8402-3585-3	August 21, 2018; 978-0-316-44232-9
09	1934 Alice in Jails: Streets; 1934 Shabahen Alice in Jails (1934 娑婆編 Alice in Jails)	December 10, 2006; 978-4-8402-3636-2	December 18, 2018; 978-0-316-44234-3
10	1934 Peter Pan in Chains: Finale; 1934 Kanketsuhen Peter Pan In Chains (1934 完結編 Peter Pan In Chains)	April 10, 2007; 978-4-8402-3805-2	April 23, 2019; 978-0-316-44236-7
On Alcatraz Island, Ladd, imprisoned for the slaughter aboard the Flying Pussyfoot, Firo, incarcerated for destruction of public property during the Mist Wall bombing, and Isaac, found guilty of various thefts, become friendly with one another and meet Huey, who was charged with treason and conspiracy years ago. Meanwhile, Christopher Shouldered, Huey's homunculus, and Graham Specter, Ladd's loyal follower, cause trouble in Chicago. After, Jacuzzi and his gang return to Chicago while Ladd attempts to kill Huey.
11	1705 The Ironic Light Orchestra	July 10, 2007; 978-4-8402-3910-3	September 3, 2019; 978-1-9753-5685-9
It is 1705 in Lotto Valentino, Italy. Huey and Elmer are amongst the students secretly studying the forbidden art of alchemy. Meanwhile, a masked serial killer runs amok.
12	2002 [Side A]: Bullet Garden	October 10, 2007; 978-4-8402-4027-7	December 24, 2019; 978-1-9753-8471-5
13	2002 [Side B]: Blood Sabbath	November 10, 2007; 978-4-8402-4069-7	April 21, 2020; 978-1-9753-8473-9
For their honeymoon in 2001, Firo and Ennis embark for Japan aboard the cruise ship Entrance. At the same time, Huey has invited a few immortals to travel from Japan to the United States aboard the Entrance's sister ship the Exit. Both ships are hijacked. However, the hijackers' operation is disrupted by the cult that once tortured Elmer.
14	1931 Another Junk Railroad: Special Express; 1931 Rinjikyūkōhen Another Junk Railroad (1931 臨時急行編 Another Junk Railroad)	January 7, 2009; 978-4-04-867462-1	September 22, 2020; 978-1-9753-8475-3
In 1932 in Manhattan, Chane, who has been welcomed to stay with Jacuzzi and Nice in Eve's home, and Claire begin their search for one another. While Claire hopes to become properly engaged, Chane wishes to kill him. Claire seeks advice on how to woo Chane and decides to send her a dress. When Chane receives it, Nice convinces her to wear it. After finding that Claire has included slits for her knives in the dress, Chane wavers in her resolve to kill him. Meanwhile, Graham plans to claim the Jacuzzi's bounty and attempts to kidnap Eve. However, he mistakes Chane for Eve and abducts her instead. Jacuzzi learns this and goes to rescue her, only to find Chane and Graham fighting one another. Shortly after, Claire, who witnessed Chane's abduction, arrives to challenge Graham. However, Graham leaves after learning that Claire tricked Ladd into jumping off the Flying Pussyfoot as Ladd wishes to deal with Claire himself. Claire proposes to Chane again, telling her they can start off as friends, and asks her if she would eventually fall in love with him. Chane agrees to this arrangement.
15	1710 Crack Flag	April 10, 2010; 978-4-04-868459-0	December 15, 2020; 978-1-9753-8477-7
In Lotto Valentino in 1707, Maiza meets playwright Jean-Pierre and alchemist Fermet and becomes interested in immortality. As a result, he joins a group of alchemists, including Begg and Czeslaw. In 1709, Huey begins to open up to Monica Campanella and Elmer. Meanwhile, a group of witch hunters arrive in town.
16	1932 Summer: Man in the Killer	June 10, 2011; 978-4-04-870556-1	April 27, 2021; 978-1-9753-2156-7
Set chronologically after Drug and the Dominos, a serial killer, 'Ice Pick Thompson', is on the loose. His victims have nothing in common except for the fact that they were brutally stabbed to death with an ice pick.
17	1711 Whitesmile	December 10, 2011; 978-4-04-886186-1	August 17, 2021; 978-1-9753-2190-1
Tensions between the Dormentaire family and the city of Lotto Valentino grow, stirred by fires set by a new wave of Mask Makers. Blame falls on the alchemists gathering in the city, who are forced to plan their escape.
18	1935-A Deep Marble	September 10, 2012; 978-4-04-886893-8	February 8, 2022; 978-1-9753-2192-5
19	1935-B Dr. Feelgreed	December 10, 2012; 978-4-04-891204-4	May 17, 2022; 978-1-9753-2194-9
20	1931 Winter: The Time of the Oasis	March 10, 2013; 978-4-04-891431-4	October 25, 2022; 978-1-9753-2196-3
21	1935-C The Grateful Bet	October 10, 2013; 978-4-04-866037-2	January 17, 2023; 978-1-9753-2198-7
22	1935-D Luckstreet Boys	August 10, 2016; 978-4-04-892184-8	May 23, 2023; 978-1-9753-2200-7

=== Additional novels ===
- 1931? The Grand Punk Railroad Revisited (回送編, Kaisō hen; lit. "Flashback Chapter"), released March 31, 2003, with the 1931 Local Chapter ・ Express Chapter (鈍行編・特急編, Donkōhen ・ Tokkyūhen) The Grand Punk Railroad drama CD. Later expanded into 1931 Another Junk Railroad: Special Express.
- 193X A man in the killer, released in five parts from October 24, 2007, to February 27, 2008, with DVDs 1 to 5. Later expanded into 1932 Summer: Man in the Killer.
- 193X The Time Of the Oasis, released in three parts March 26, 2008, to May 28, 2008, with DVDs 6 to 8. Later expanded into 1931 Winter: The Time of the Oasis.
