= List of Romeo × Juliet characters =

This is a list of characters from Gonzo's Romeo × Juliet anime series. Although the series is loosely based on Shakespeare's original play many characters that were based on Shakespeare's original characters in Romeo & Juliet have gone through drastic changes concerning personality, relationships, role in the story and final outcome.

== Main characters ==
Juliet (ジュリエット, Jurietto)
Voiced by: Fumie Mizusawa (Japanese); Brina Palencia (English)
The protagonist of the series. Juliet Fiammata Arst de Capulet is the last member of the Capulet family and later Romeo's wife. She disguises herself as a boy, Odin, in order to avoid being caught by the usurping House of Montague, who still actively look for the Capulets. An excellent swordswoman, she also masquerades as a vigilante, the Red Whirlwind, in order to aid the people oppressed by the rival Montagues. She unwittingly falls in love with Romeo, which leads to several complications for her. The Capulet house has a dark secret. Escalus, the tree which holds Neo Verona in the air, is dying; the daughters of the Capulet family are the seeds of the tree and thus must sacrificially merge with it in order to save the world. Juliet does that when she finds out Romeo is dying after being stabbed by Ophelia, and holds him in her arms and merges with the Escalus, descending the floating island of Neo Verona on the ground level as well in the process.
In the series, Juliet is presented as a strong and intelligent young woman, she is loving, with a strong sense of justice and determination to lead the Capulet faction against the oppression of the corrupt Lord Montague. She falls deeply in love with Romeo and is stricken with the decision of being with Romeo or destroying Lord Montague. In the original play, Juliet is shown as a sheltered, innocent and emotional young woman who immediately falls in love with Romeo when she meets him and does not care that he is a Montague. Her series counterpart backs away from Romeo after learning who he is, despite having fallen deeply in love with him, but eventually gets over it and marries Romeo in episode 11.

Romeo (ロミオ, Romio)
Voiced by: Takahiro Mizushima (Japanese); Chris Burnett (English)
The hero of the series. Romeo Candore de Montague is the son of Lord Leontes Montague and Lady Portia, heir to the throne of Neo Verona and later Juliet's husband. For political reasons, he has been forced into an unwanted engagement with Hermione, a young and innocent noblewoman. As a nobleman, he rides and owns a white dragon steed named Cielo whom he later freed. In contrast to his father, he is obedient and kindhearted, often disapproving of his family's tyranny. He is ostracized by the nobility save for his friend, Benvolio. He falls in love with Juliet at first sight. At the end after the battle against Montague, Romeo along with Juliet's allies free Juliet from Escalus but is fatally stabbed by Ophelia. When he dies, Juliet decides to merge with Escalus, whilst holding Romeo in her arms so she can save Neo Verona and uphold her vow to Romeo.
In the series, Romeo is the crown prince of Neo Verona, and a confident, polite young man. He has little respect for his Montague heritage because of his father's tyranny. Unlike his counterpart in the source material, Romeo first encounters Juliet at a party hosted by his family, whereas in the play, he had secretly gone to a Capulet party in hopes of seeing Juliet's cousin, Rosaline, who he believed he was in love with before meeting Juliet. He holds nothing against the Capulet family and falls in love with Juliet, wishing only for them to be happy and safe, even going as far as marrying her in episode 11.

== Montagues ==
Lord Montague (モンタギュー, Montagyū)
Voiced by: Kōji Ishii (Japanese); Sean Hennigan (Adult), Luci Christian (Young Leontes) (English)
Leontes van de Montague is the ruthless, tyrannical, Machiavellian Prince of Neo Verona. He, an illegitimate Capulet offspring, and his mother (a prostitute) were born and raised into poverty. The death of his mother sparks his unrelenting and ferocious grudge against the Capulet name and his ambitions for being Duke (it is also implied that he was sexually abused when he was adopted into House Montague). He acts coldly to all around him, only seeming to care about the Great Tree Escalus. His main goal in the series is to find Lord Capulet's surviving child and kill her before the people still loyal to the Capulets can rebel. He is determined to have Romeo follow in his footsteps, though he doesn't find out till later in the series that he has another son, Tybalt, who is also a Capulet. Leontes is killed by a mad Mercutio, moments before surrendering to Juliet, admitting that he has never been loved. His given name, Leontes, is also shared by the main character of Shakespeare's The Winter's Tale.
In the play, Lord Montague is a minor character appearing in only a few scenes of the play. While present, he is shown as being a caring and overprotective father to his son, showing no interest in destroying the Capulets but desiring for them to leave the Montagues alone instead. In the series, he is shown as the main antagonist and acts as Duke of Neo Verona instead of just being the head of his own household.
Lady Portia (ポーシア, Pōshia)
Voiced by: Aya Hisakawa (Japanese); Dana Schultes (English)
Portia Clemenzia de Ebe is Romeo's mother, who reluctantly left him and the Montague name to live at a convent to avoid associating herself with the bloody and cruel ambitions of her husband. She is a kind, intelligent and understanding woman who prays for Romeo's happiness. Giving him Cielo as a present when she left. Her name is possibly derived from the clever and wealthy heiress of The Merchant of Venice and the wife of Brutus from Shakespeare's Julius Caesar.
Romeo's mother is known only as Lady Montague in the original play and appears only a few scenes; she is depicted as an over-protective and loving mother who dies of heartbreak when she learns of her son's banishment before the end of the play. In the series, Lady Montague is named Portia and remains a loving mother who wishes for her son's happiness; however, she holds no loyalty to the Montagues, when she saw how power-mad he was, and harbors no hostility to the Capulet faction, and shows sympathy and kindness to Juliet.
Benvolio (ペンヴォーリオ, Benvōrio)
Voiced by: Shinnosuke Tachibana (Japanese); Sean Michael Teague (English)
Benvolio de Frescobaldi is one of Romeo's close friends. He is the son of the mayor of Neo Verona and one of the few people concerned with Romeo's well-being. He often acts as Romeo's voice of reason and moderation. He and his family are later stripped of their nobility and go into hiding with the help of Juliet and her friends. Late in the series, he falls in love with, and weds Cordelia. During the epilogue to the last episode, Benvolio and Cordelia are seen with their newborn baby.
Benvolio's character has changed little in the adaptation and remains a level-headed and well-mannered friend to Romeo. However, he is not Romeo's cousin and a member of the Montague family, like in the play.
Vittorio (ヴィシトーリオ, Vishitorio)
Voiced by: Eiji Miyashita (Japanese); Joel McDonald (English)
Vittorio de Frescobaldi is Benvolio's father, leader of the House of Frescobaldi and mayor of Neo Verona, and an old friend of Conrad's, who held reservations concerning Montague's rule. He was a member of the moderate faction of the Montague dictatorship, with a large amount of administrative authority as the mayor of Neo Verona. He is later stripped of his title and nobility and even slated for assassination by Lord Montague, for allowing the Red Whirlwind to create civil discontent throughout Neo Verona. He is reestablished as the mayor at the end of the story.
Mercutio de Marchege (マキューシオ, Makyūshio)
Voiced by: Tetsuya Kakihara (Japanese); Christopher Bevins (English)
An ambitious and sly noble who wishes to become Leontes's heir due to his apparent resentment of his father. He is contemptuous of the common people. Late in the series, he is adopted as Leontes's new heir but is unprepared for the bloody initiation, whose climax was Titus' death at the hands of Leontes. His inability to act in his father's defense traumatizes him and later leads to insanity. He acts as a spy for Lord Montague to unearth why Romeo is acting oddly and is trying to ensure that Leontes will disown his son for loving Juliet so he can become Leontes's heir. Despite showing a degree of loyalty to Romeo, he only shows it in order to weasel up to Leontes. After Leontes slays his father in a duel for blackmailing him, he accepts Mercutio as his new heir but the condition causes him to go hysterical, leading him to stab Leontes as Juliet and Tybalt command their surrender.
In the play, Mercutio is not Romeo's rival but his and Benvolio's mutual best friend and acts as a reckless free spirited jokester, who truly cares for Romeo but lets his own hot-bloodedness override his weariness of the feud ('A plague on both your houses!'). The Mercutio of the anime shares little in common with his play counterpart. However, his fall into madness and murder of a sovereign in vengeance for his father is evocative of Shakespeare's Hamlet.
Titus de Marchege (タイタス, Taitasu)
Voiced by: Jin Urayama (Japanese); Sonny Strait (English)
Mercutio's father who is an alcoholic degenerate of the court. He earned his position by secretly ordering the assassinations of nearly everyone with knowledge of Leontes's origins. But when Romeo is exiled to the countryside, Titus arrogantly blackmails Leontes to make Mercutio his new heir if he doesn't want his past to be revealed. For betraying him, Leontes kills Titus in a duel while claiming his death was accidental. Three characters in Shakespeare's plays have the name "Titus", the most well-known being the title character of the violent Titus Andronicus.
Hermione (ハーマイオニ, Hāmaioni)
Voiced by: Sayaka Ohara (Japanese); Carrie Savage (English)
Hermione de Borromeo is a young noblewoman who is betrothed to Romeo in a political marriage at the Rose Ball. Sweet, sheltered and gentle, she appears to be genuinely in love with him though he doesn't reciprocate her feelings for him. However, she's also very passive-aggressive, having the tendency to keep her negative feelings or thoughts to herself, only to unleash them later. She holds a hatred for Juliet, however, upon meeting Juliet and seeing her genuine love for Romeo and compassion for herself, Hermione comes to be at peace with her. Hermione seems to be a stand-in for Count Paris from the play, though she is female and is a Montague ally. Hermione could also be lifted from Shakespeare's The Winter's Tale; the Hermione of that play is entangled in a conflict over adultery.

== Capulets ==
Lord Capulet (キャピュレット, Kyapyuretto)
Voiced by: Satoshi Taki (Japanese); Scott Freeman (English)
Lord Capulet was Juliet's father. Along with his family (excluding Juliet), he was killed in Lord Montague's coup d'état fourteen years before the story starts, as a part of Montague's scheme to take over Neo Verona and achieve revenge on the whole Capulet clan for the suffering and pain he and his mother went through for them. Although Lord Capulet was only seen at the beginning of the series before he was murdered by Lord Montague, he was mentioned several times by other characters.
He was depicted as being a kind, wise and fair ruler over Neo Verona, before the murder of his family. In the original play, Lord Capulet and his wife live through the entire play; while present, he appears as a loving father to Juliet, though he also acts stubborn and controlling. At the end of the play, he makes peace with Montague after the death of his daughter and son-in-law.

Cordelia (コーディリア, Kōdiria)
Voiced by: Miyu Matsuki (Japanese); Colleen Clinkenbeard (English)
Juliet's best friend since childhood and another survivor of the Capulet massacre (along with Curio and Francisco, her relatives worked as Capulet vassals and died in the slaughter along with their masters), she has helped take care of Juliet since then and also acts as her private confidante. Juliet relates that the reason why she kept her hair long -rather than cut it for an easier boy-like appearance- was because Cordelia liked it that way as servants often can't relish the luxury of cosmetics. She has been hinted to have feelings for Romeo's friend, Benvolio, and agrees to marry him later in the series. She hands her wedding bouquet to Juliet, wishing for her friend's and Romeo's happiness. At the end of the series, she and Benvolio have a child. She is clearly based on the nurse, but in the series is treated more like an older sister figure to Juliet instead of a mother figure and her namesake is from Cordelia from Shakespeare's King Lear.
Conrad (コンラッド, Konraddo)
Voiced by: Katsuhisa Hōki (Japanese); R. Bruce Elliott (English)
Captain of the Capulet Guards who saved Juliet and Cordelia from death fourteen years ago. Now a priest, he looks after Juliet, though he is exasperated by her antics. It is Conrad who reveals to Juliet her secret heritage on the day of her sixteenth birthday when he presents to her the sword of the House of Capulet. He fights with a sword in battle. He later acts as the de facto leader of the Capulet faction, planning an assassination attempt on Lord Montague (he wants to only kill the Duke so that less blood is spilled); however, after being betrayed by his old friend Camio, he is injured in a Montague raid against the Capulet supporters. Since his escape, he has been under the care of Ariel. When he recovers, he presents the Capulet family sword to Juliet again, reviving her resolve for the Capulet's cause. When Juliet disappears after Montague's defeat, he orders Francisco and Curio to search for her. He is evacuated from the castle during the battle for Juliet. During the finale, he tends to an iris flower memorial with Antonio, wondering if his past actions with Juliet were fair. His name is most likely taken from the servant of the villainous Don John from Much Ado About Nothing.
Antonio (アントニオ)
Voiced by: Ryō Hirohashi (Japanese); Maxey Whitehead (English)
Conrad's grandson, introduced as a young boy at the beginning of the series. He participates in the Red Whirlwind's heroic acts as a sidekick and helper, and works in William's theatre. He is one of the few living with Juliet that did not know her identity or gender until it is revealed to him on her 16th birthday. His arsenal of choice revolves around trickery including various bombs and firecrackers. After the formation of the new Capulet faction, Antonio works as a spy and helps Curio and Francisco rescue Juliet when she is captured by Montague. He has a crush on Regan. At the end of the series, he is shown as a young adult, assured that Juliet wanted everyone to be happy. He name is lifted from the characters from the Shakespearean plays The Merchant of Venice and The Tempest.
Francisco (フランシスコ, Furanshisuko)
Voiced by: Hirofumi Nojima (Japanese); Eric Vale (English)
Childhood friend of Curio and the more intellectual of the duo. He believes that Juliet is being protected by Neo Verona itself and is himself a ladies' man who enjoys teasing the more reserved Curio. He is an expert at archery and other various thrown weapons. Sneaky and sly, he managed to contact Tybalt so he could take Juliet to safety when the Montague faction discovered their hideout. He escapes and later joins Curio to rescue Juliet from Montague. Out of all of Juliet's comrades, he is the one who openly vouches for Romeo's love for Juliet. Curio later suspects if Francisco has concealed feelings for Juliet, but he dodged the questions by affirming his loyalty to the Capulets. During their later night assault against one of the enemy posts, he confesses to having "friends" with information. Along with Curio, he assisted clearing a Romeo path to the crumbling Escalus. Years later, he shown again as an active member of Neo Verona's parliament. His name is borrowed from the minor characters in Hamlet and The Tempest.
Curio (キュリオ, Kyurio)
Voiced by: Kōsuke Toriumi (Japanese); Robert McCollum (English)
A close friend of Francisco and a skilled swordsman who had lost the use of his right eye. He is also Juliet's fencing teacher, and according to him, a sword reflects the soul of its owner. His preferred weapons are axes or polearms. His scarred visage originated from protecting a younger rebellious Juliet from receiving punishment from members of the Carabinieri. Though he blames his own foolhardiness for the blow, Juliet's frustration from that time gave birth to her alter ego, The Red Whirlwind.
After the Montague raid against the Capulet supporters, he goes into hiding until Juliet is captured. When he and Francisco go to rescue her, he convinces Juliet that her life is worth saving. Later it is hinted in episode 16 that he may have romantic feelings toward Juliet. However, like Francisco, he too helped Romeo reach Juliet in her final moments. After Juliet's sacrifice, he settles down as a grocer of his own vegetable store. His is possibly referenced from a minor character in Shakespeare's famous comedy, Twelfth Night.
Tybalt (ティボルト, Tiboruto)
Voiced by: Ryōtarō Okiayu (Japanese); Mike McFarland (English)
A mysterious warrior who aids the Capulet retainers, he tells them about the planned assassination of Benvolio's family and later aids them on his own dragon steed mounted in war gear. It is later revealed that he has a network of paid spies and informants throughout Neo Verona and that he has no qualms about killing. Tybalt is also one of the few outside the circle of Capulet retainers who knows both Juliet's secret as the last of the Capulets and her persona as the Red Whirlwind. Conrad may know the true scope of Tybalt's identity, but is still unsure.
Tybalt's mother, Volumnia de Capulet was tricked by Romeo's father, who abandoned her when he got her pregnant and married Romeo's mother. That means Tybalt is Montague illegitimate son/Romeo's half brother. For his mother's sake, he has sworn to hate and avenge her by killing the Prince of Neo Verona.
In the original play, Tybalt was presented as a hot-headed and arrogant young man with a fierce loyalty to the Capulets who is eventually killed in combat with Romeo after killing Mercutio. In the series, he is presented as more of an anti-hero with a much calmer disposition acting as a supporter to the Capulet rebels but with his own motives.

== Other characters ==
Emilia (エミリア, Emiria)
Voiced by: Ayako Kawasumi (Japanese); Larissa Wolcott (English)
An actress infatuated with Juliet's disguise, Odin. Pretty and youthful, she invites Odin as Juliet to the Rose Ball where Juliet meets Romeo for the first time. She remains unaware of Odin's true identity until much later in the series. Her name may be a reference to several characters in Shakespeare's plays, including Othello, The Winter's Tale, and The Two Noble Kinsmen.
Ophelia (オフィーリア, Ofīria)
Voiced by: Junko Iwao (Japanese); Jamie Marchi (English)
A mysterious woman who tends to the Great Tree Escalus. She has a sad, doll-like face with strange marks on her forehead and cheeks, and speaks in a rather polite and mysterious manner. Her true identity is never revealed, but it is implied that she is the physical human form of Escalus, as whenever the tree further rots, so does she. She also appears to be ageless as she looks the same as she did fourteen years ago. She reveals that since Montague's reign over Neo Verona began, the Great Tree Escalus has been slowly decaying, particularly since its companion tree died when Montague took the throne. When Juliet is captured by Montague, she encounters Ophelia during her escape; Ophelia plants within Juliet the means to save Neo Verona, though at the cost of Juliet's life. She mortally wounds Romeo shortly before being vanquished by him. Her name is likely a nod to the heroine of Shakespeare's famous tragedy, Hamlet.
Camilo (カミロ, Kamiro)
Voiced by: Jiro Saito (Japanese); Christopher Ayres (English)
Conrad's good friend who betrayed him by giving information regarding the Capulets' hideout to the Montagues. He is later found by Juliet, Francisco, and Curio to be in luxurious housing alongside a disgruntled Tybalt, whom he helped to raise. After being threatened by the latter, he flees from his mansion. Camilo's name is likely a nod to the character from The Winter's Tale, a character who defected from his liege King Leontes after Camilo was ordered to kill King Polixenes.
Petruchio (ペトルーキオ, Petorūkio)
Voiced by: Akio Suyama (Japanese); Dan Forsythe (English)
A sickly young man who works in one of the Montagues' mines. He has contempt for Romeo at first, and after Romeo saves him from being crushed, the two men eventually become friends. Originally sent to the mines for stealing bread for his starving family, he is desperate to serve his sentence and return to Neo Verona because his younger brother and sister are still there. Petruchio dies from illness, albeit peacefully after Romeo promises to give his siblings a ride on his dragon steed, which leaves Romeo visibly distraught. After Montague's death and his self banishment from Neo Verona, Romeo asks Tybalt to find and care for Petruchio's siblings. Petruchio's name is likely a nod to the character from The Taming of the Shrew, one of Shakespeare's early comedies. Petruchio also is the name of a ghost character in Romeo and Juliet, identified as a Capulet and a companion of Tybalt.
Giovanni (ジョヴァンニ, Jyovanni)
Voiced by: Tōru Ōkawa (Japanese); Greg Dulcie (English)
A miner who looks out for Romeo during his stay at the mines. While he admires Romeo's idealistic dream of creating a world where people can live together without sacrifices, Giovanni also believes that Romeo has chosen a long and difficult path to pursue. He often acts as a leader for the village in Romeo's absence. His name is possibly a reference to the poet Giovanni Battista Giraldi, who authored works that provided the plots for Shakespeare's Measure for Measure and Othello.
The Old Man (老人, Rōjin)
Voiced by: Kazuo Oka (Japanese); T. A. Taylor (English)
A mysterious yet sage man who frequently smokes from a long pipe, he is suggested, like Ophelia, to bear some connection to Escalus. He acts as Romeo's spiritual adviser, mentioning that the noble will have to someday shoulder Juliet's fate. The Old Man is possibly an allusion to Friar Lawrence, a character with somewhat similar motivations.
Balthazar
Voiced by: Ikuo Nishikawa (Japanese); Mark Stoddard (English)
Balthasar is the owner of a villa in Mantua. He welcomed Juliet and her followers into his villa for a brief period of time.
Regan
Voiced by: Chiwa Saitō (Japanese); Leah Clark (English)
Regan is Balthasar's granddaughter. She is a serious girl who is a little bossy and shares many similar attributes to Hermione. She likes to be treated like a girl and has a talent for acting.
William (ウィリアム, Wiriamu)
Voiced by: Kazuhiko Inoue (Japanese); J. Michael Tatum (English)
William de Farnase, a flamboyant playwright whose works have not been well-received by audiences. He's nicknamed "Willy" by his actors and stagehands. He allows Juliet and her entourage to use his theater for shelter. He knows that Juliet is deeply and painfully in love, calling her "the maiden who gave up on love", and wants to make a play based on tragedy where both lovers die. The character itself is a caricature of William Shakespeare.

== See also ==
- Characters in Romeo and Juliet

== Sources ==
- Viel, Josh (15 July 2009). "Anime Review: Romeo x Juliet, Part One". The Escapist.
- Viel, Josh (3 September 2009). "Anime Review: Romeo x Juliet, Part Two". The Escapist.
