= Maxey Whitehead =

American voice actress

- Occupation: Voice actress
- Years active: 1996–present

Maxey Whitehead is an American voice actress who provided voices for a number of English-language versions of Japanese anime. She is generally cast as young boys or young girls. Her roles include Alphonse Elric from Fullmetal Alchemist: Brotherhood, Dende from Dragon Ball Z Kai, Czeslaw Meyer from Baccano!, Crona from Soul Eater, and Ellis from El Cazador de la Bruja.

== Biography ==
Whitehead was working as a stage actor when her friend R. Bruce Elliott was planning to audition for Romeo × Juliet and invited her along. She auditioned and landed the voice actor part of Antonio. She also voiced Ellis in the girls-with-guns anime El Cazador de la Bruja and voices the main character Tsukimi Kurashita in Princess Jellyfish.

Whitehead was roommates with fellow voice actress Emily Neves in college. She has stated that her favorite character to voice so far in her career has been Crona from Soul Eater.

== Dubbing roles ==
=== Anime ===
- A Certain Magical Index the Movie: The Miracle of Endymion – Ladylee Tangleroad
- A Certain Scientific Railgun – Aomi Yanagisako
- Baccano! – Czeslaw Meyer
- Birdy the Mighty: Decode – Shoko Kagami
- Black Butler – Richard
- Case Closed: The Phantom of Baker Street – Hiroki Sawada, Noah's Ark
- Casshern Sins – Hoto (Ep. 17), Toro (Ep. 11)
- Corpse Princess – Shota
- Darker than Black – Maki
- Death Parade – Jiro (Ep. 5)
- Dimension W – Elizabeth Greenhough-Smith
- Dragon Ball Z Kai – Dende (Young)
- El Cazador de la Bruja – Ellis
- Fairy Tail – Lullaby
- Free! – Rin Matsuoka (Young)
- Fullmetal Alchemist: Brotherhood – Alphonse Elric
- Fullmetal Alchemist: The Sacred Star of Milos – Alphonse Elric
- Gunslinger Girl -Il Teatrino – Pinocchio (Young)
- Hero Tales – Hosei Meitoku (Young)
- Hetalia: Axis Powers – Sealand
- Kamisama Kiss 2 – Kurama (Young)
- Kaze no Stigma – Kazuma Yagami (Young)
- Last Exile: Fam, the Silver Wing – Johann (young)
- Level E – Doris, Kyoko Mikihisa (Young)
- Michiko & Hatchin – Blackie (Eps. 3–4)
- My Hero Academia: Heroes Rising – Katsuma Shimano
- Ōkami-san and her Seven Companions – Chutaro Nezumi (Ep. 8)
- One Piece – Akibi (Young)
- Phantom ~Requiem for the Phantom~ – Duke Stone
- Ping Pong: The Animation – Yutaka "Peco" Hoshino (Young)
- Princess Jellyfish – Tsukimi Kurashita
- Romeo × Juliet – Antonio
- Rosario + Vampire Capu2 – Lilith
- The Sacred Blacksmith – Doris
- Sekirei – Shiina
- Sengoku Basara: Samurai Kings – Mori Ranmaru
- Sgt. Frog – Poyon
- Shiki – Hiromi Murasako
- Soul Eater – Crona
- Space Dandy – Erssime (Ep. 18)
- Spice and Wolf II – Lunt
- Strike Witches 2 – Fernandia Malvezzi (Ep. 12)
- Summer Wars – Kazuma Ikezawa
- Tokyo Ghoul √A – Juuzo Suzuya
- Tsubasa Tokyo Revelations – Kakyo Kazuki

=== Video games ===
- Dragon Ball Z: Ultimate Tenkaichi – Dende
- Dragon Ball Xenoverse 2 – Dende
- Dragon Ball Z: Kakarot – Dende
- Dragon Ball: Sparking! Zero – Dende
