= Isaac and Miria =

Fictional characters in Baccano!

Isaac & Miria
- Baccano! character
- Isaac and Miria as illustrated by Katsumi Enami
- First appearance: The Rolling Bootlegs; Baccano! anime episode 1
- Created by: Ryohgo Narita; Katsumi Enami
- Voiced by: Japanese; Masaya Onosaka and Sayaka Aoki; English; J. Michael Tatum and Caitlin Glass (Baccano!); Sam Riegel and Jennie Kwan (Durarara!!)

Isaac Dian (アイザック·ディアン, Aizakku Dian) and Miria Harvent (ミリア·ハーヴェント, Miria Hāvento) are fictional characters in the light novel and anime series Baccano! written by Ryohgo Narita and illustrated by Katsumi Enami. Isaac and Miria are a pair of idiotic and eccentric lovers who dress up in costumes and commit strange robberies in Prohibition-era United States. In 1930, the duo are two of many characters who mistake an immortality elixir for alcohol and drink it at a celebration, inadvertently gaining immortality and eternal youth. The next year, they board the Flying Pussyfoot express train and survive the bloody hijacking that occurs. Isaac is arrested for various thefts in 1934 and imprisoned on Alcatraz Island. He is released the same year and reunites with Miria. The pair continue to live happily, finally realizing they are immortal in 2001. Isaac and Miria appear in the other media relating to the Baccano! franchise, including the video game, the two drama CDs and manga adaptation.

Numerous publications in various media have been written on the subject of Isaac and Miria's characters. Most described them as the most entertaining characters and commented on how the series would not be the same without them. One reviewer felt that they are the protagonists of the series, which features an ensemble cast. They were awarded "Duo of the Year" in 2009 by Anime News Network.

== Voice portrayal ==
In the Japanese version of Baccano!'s anime adaptation, Isaac has been voiced by Masaya Onosaka and Miria has been voiced by Sayaka Aoki. In the English version, Isaac's role has been played by J. Michael Tatum and Caitlin Glass has played Miria. Tyler Walker, ADR director for the English version, wanted Isaac to be portrayed by someone who can convincingly portray an idiot and had a certain voice from the time period. He felt that Tatum was perfect because his voice was big, but not cheesy, and had depth. While casting Miria, he chose Glass because her voice complemented Tatum's. He wanted a lower pitch than Isaac's voice, but wanted the same enthusiasm for both characters.

== Appearances ==
=== In the light novels and anime series ===
Within the series, set during the Prohibition-era of the United States, Isaac and Miria "are a pair of idiotic lovers and thieves" who are portrayed as "always enthusiastic and optimistic". They are often mistaken for performers because of the variety of disguises they employ during their heists, such as dressing up as mummies or as the Tramp. The duo commit a variety of eccentric robberies, including attempting to steal time by stealing watches, trying to stop anyone from entering a museum by stealing the entrance and stealing the Genoard family fortune to prevent the family from fighting over it. Miria exhibits a complete trust in Isaac and supports anything he says no matter how ridiculous it is and often goes as far to mimic his body language and his speech, although she often does not really know what she is saying. Although the pair are very idiotic, Isaac is not completely stupid and there are occasions that shows that he displays his inner intelligence. He is able to recognize a pair of plainclothes officers because he claims that he is familiar with their speech style. Isaac and Miria may have been born into wealthy families because they state that their parents' homes and the Genoard mansion have similar exteriors.

In the Rolling Bootlegs, set in 1930, Isaac and Miria decide to visit Manhattan. When attempting to buy several disguises, they briefly meet Camorristi Firo Prochainezo and Maiza Avaro and befriend the homunculus Ennis, instilling her with confidence and hope. They decide to rob the very small Martillo and Gandor families. The pair sneak into the Martillo's speakeasy, the Alveare, to scout the area, and while they are in the storage room, Isaac is nearly killed by a ceremonial gunshot from Firo's caporegime inauguration downstairs. Firo and Maiza respond to Miria's scream for help, and the couple are invited to the celebration as an apology. Shortly afterward, they leave to investigate the Gandor headquarters. Believing it contains money, they steal a box. However, they find a bottle of immortality elixir inside, which they mistake for alcohol. Disappointed there is no money, they give the bottle to the Martillo thank them for their kindness. This prompts the immortal Szilard Quates, who owns the elixir and created Ennis, to attack the Alveare to retrieve the elixir. He orders Ennis to kill Isaac and Miria, but she attacks Szilard instead. When he is about to kill her, Isaac and Miria defend her, buying enough time for another immortal to devour Szilard, the only way to kill an immortal. It is later discovered that the immortality elixir was not in the bottle the duo stole. Firo, not realizing what it was, had stolen it earlier and distributed it at the celebration, bestowing immortality and eternal youth on all the guests, including Isaac and Miria. In the anime series, the bottle the pair stole is truly the immortality elixir and they inadvertently distribute it at the party as a gesture of thanks toward the Martillo. Afterward, the two travel to California and search for gold.

In the two Grand Punk Railroad novels, set during late 1931, the pair receive a letter from Ennis and decide to visit her in Manhattan. To buy her a gift, they create a plan to rob a train, but instead steal money from the Russo family and make their escape aboard the Flying Pussyfoot express train. There, they befriend gangsters Jacuzzi Splot and Nice Holystone and the immortal boy Czeslaw Meyer. They tell the legend of the Rail Tracer, a monster that eats train passengers, causing Jacuzzi to leave in a panic. Shortly after, the train is hijacked and they escape in the confusion. Later, the duo discover the conductors' mutilated bodies. Believing that the story of the Rail Tracer has come true, they assume Jacuzzi has also been eaten, only to discover otherwise. Isaac and Miria make up their minds to ask the Rail Tracer to leave, oblivious to the seriousness of the situation and how dangerous the Rail Tracer is. They find Czeslaw's body underneath the train in their search for the monster. When trying to rescue him, Isaac cuts himself, revealing their immortality to Czeslaw. Believing they are trying to devour him, the boy decides to devour them first, but changes his mind after they rescue him and promise to be his family. After the train arrives in Manhattan, they realize they never bought Ennis a present and tell her their gift is Czeslaw, who will be her younger brother.

Afterward, they stay with the Martillo and spend their time in the Alveare restaurant setting up and knocking down dominoes. In The Slash, Firo's purposely knocks over their dominoes, enraging Isaac and Miria. The pair decide to spend the night at the Genoard mansion with Jacuzzi. When Tim and the Larvae arrive at the mansion, they believe that the display of Dallas' immortality is a magic trick and the fights are dances. Isaac inadvertently reveals his own immortality when he receives a cut trying to praise the "dancers." After everyone departs the mansion, the duo decide to "steal" Ronnie Sukiart and Ennis, two people precious to Firo, in an attempt to make him apologize. However, Firo wrongly assumes that Dallas kidnapped Ronnie and Ennis. Isaac and Miria are confronted by plainclothes officers in 1934 in Imprisoned Chapter Alice in Jails. Isaac knows they are in fact police-in-disguise and realizes that Miria is unaware of this and sends her away. He is arrested for multiple thefts and imprisoned on Alcatraz Island. Isaac is released later in the year and reunites with Miria in Chicago, as told in Conclusion Chapter Peter Pan In Chains. In Children of Bottle, set in 2001, they finally understand they are immortal after realizing they have not aged at all.

=== In other media ===
Isaac and Miria appear in the series' two drama CDs; they survive the Flying Pussyfoot incident in 1931 Local Chapter ・ Express Chapter The Grand Punk Railroad and hope to meet true revolutionaries in a small Mexican village in Firo Prochainezo witnesses the 53rd death of Pietro Gonzalez. The pair are also playable characters in the Baccano! video game and are characters in the two-volume manga; like the first drama CD, the video game and manga adaptations recount the events aboard the Pussyfoot. The pair have also made a brief appearance in an episode of the Durarara!! anime series, voiced by Sam Riegel and Jennie Kwan in the English dub, during which they are in modern-day Ikebukuro, Tokyo and attend the first meeting of the Dollars, an anonymous online gang.

== Reception ==
Isaac and Miria have been named one of two of 2009's "Duo of the Year" by Theron Martin of Anime News Network (ANN). He felt that the pair were "flawlessly in synch" and were "comedic gold". He believed that they are "endlessly entertaining" because of their "kooky natures, dimwittedness, and talents for both disrupting the intended flow of any situation and succeeding despite themselves". Martin also stated that the series would only be "half as great without them", despite the fact that they are members of such a large cast. Martin praised the performances of J. Michael Tatum and Caitlin Glass, citing the actors' ability to "steal the show in every appearance" and "sell [the pair] as thoroughly as any voice actors could possibly do, giving them every ounce of verve and idiotic enthusiasm that their characters' action say they should have." Hartel comments that the voice actors "deserve special recognition for some flat out, insane voice work." Although Surat and Tool were not opposed to the English dubbing, they felt that Isaac's accent sounded weird and "might get on someone's nerves."

In his review of the series, Martin called them as the "most entertaining characters" of the series and "one of anime's liveliest and most entertaining couples". He described their constant glee as infectious and their "bizarre logic" as priceless. He felt that their presence "elevates the series from merely a very good one to a truly exceptional one." He believes that they always "make the most of their screen time", noting how every one of their actions "give an entirely new twist to the events otherwise playing out normally." Carl Kimlinger, also from ANN, adds that "the things those two can do to a well-laid plan are simply appalling." Davey Jones of Active Anime felt the pair was the "highlight of the story" and should have their own series. Chris Beveridge from Mania Entertainment described the two as "very off center in a colorful and fun way" and believed they stood out from the large cast because they were "far more outgoing." He felt that the connections they make with the rest of the cast "are fun to watch and there's only a kind of elegance to it". Beveridge commented that "when this pair comes on the screen, [he] can't help but smile" and that he "enjoy[s] all of the scenes that involve [them] because they bring such a lighthearted aspect to the show that's definitely needed to break up the more intense scenes." DVD Talk's Todd Douglass felt that Isaac and Miria are "the uplifting and energetic component of [the] show," feeling that it is entertaining to see how they influenced the events. Nick Hartel, also from DVD Talk, believed that it would be cruel not to mention them. He described them to be filled with "a maniac energy, often brought to a screeching halt by melodramatic breakdowns over trivial occurrences or bold assumptions." Although he admit they seem to have to place in the series at first, he notes that their interactions with other characters "causes a drastic shift in tone." He comments that as the plot progresses, the pair "become a bright spot as storylines take dark turns and serve as a reminder of the goodness that makes up the vast majority of the world." Daryl Surat of the Anime World Order Podcast and quest Mike Toole believed that out of every other character in the ensemble cast, the pair are the "default protagonists" simply because they meet every other character. They also felt that if ignorance is bliss, they are the happiest people "in the world" because they are "that stupid". The two characters were compared to Bonnie and Clyde, but the reviewers felt that were more like Blue Falcon and Dynomutt, characters from the animated series Dynomutt, Dog Wonder. Even if the events become grim, the reviewers could not help but smile as Isaac and Miria appear. ANN columnist Erin Finnegan described Isaac and Miria as " a couple of completely loveable weirdoes". She agreed that the subplot revolving around them "takes some of the edge off the dark moments." Amanda Tarbet of SequentialTart.com drew parallels between the duo and the trickster god archetype. She compared them to the kitsune of Japanese folklore, which are portrayed "as tricksters, but also as nurturing characters such as guardians and friends". She felt that Isaac and Miria "represent this duality perfectly." Tarbet also described them as part Bonnie and Clyde and part Rodgers and Hammerstein.
