= List of Baccano! characters =

The Baccano! light novel and anime series feature an extensive ensemble cast of characters created by Ryohgo Narita and illustrated by Katsumi Enami. Largely set in a fictional United States, the series tells many loosely connected stories about people brought together by immortality and is often told from multiple points of view. The events occur throughout many decades; most take place during the Prohibition-era while others are set in the 18th century and the first decade of the 21st century.

The cast is made up of many seemingly unconnected characters and at least twenty main characters, including Isaac Dian and Miria Harvent, a pair of eccentric thieves; Firo Prochainezo and his mentor Maiza Avaro, members of Manhattan's small Camorrista Martillo family; Keith, Berga and Luck Gandor, three brothers who manage the small Gandor mafia family, also based in Manhattan; Szilard Quates, who recreates an immortality elixir which many characters accidentally drink, and his homunculus Ennis; Dallas Genoard, a young thug from a wealthy family, and his sister Eve; Czeslaw Meyer, a young boy; mafia hitman Ladd Russo and his fiancée Lua Klein; mute bodyguard Chane Laforet; gangsters Nice Holystone and Jacuzzi Splot; and the Gandors' adoptive brother Claire Stanfield, also known as the legendary assassin Vino.

While developing the series, Narita did not create a detailed outline. Instead, he created the story around on how the characters would act, which changed the original plots and structures of the novels. Although he allows the characters to "move" how they "want", he finds it troublesome because certain characters move "too much" and leave the plot "in ruins"; in addition, other characters are hard to move along with the plot. Tyler Walker, the ADR director of the English dub of the series, states that casting for the series was difficult due to the large number of characters and the character types. The characters Narita created were praised for their differences in appearance and personality, and each was said to have his or her own psychosis.

== Creation and conception ==
The author of the light novel series Ryohgo Narita noticed that the large cast in The Rolling Bootlegs seems to have different motives, but intentionally or not, they all move toward the same end. He stated that he never wrote a detailed outline for the book, and so the story was created based on how the characters would act. The characters' actions changed the planned story and structure of the book. During the early drafts, Maiza Avaro was a hypnotist, Ennis was a succubus, and Szilard Quates was able to use magic. In addition, every Camorrista was killed, except for Firo Prochainezo. However, he is happy these ideas were not included in the novels. Narita did not model Firo after anyone, and he believes the character is plain as a result. Although Firo is "supposedly" the protagonist, he found it hard "moving" Firo along with the plot. This problem is solved once Firo's affection for Ennis became apparent. His feelings toward Firo's situation as an Italian immigrant are influenced by an article written by an Italian novelist. The article stated that, as a child, the novelist wished to be like the Italians in the movies because they were happier than the people the novelist saw in real-life.

While planning the two Grand Punk Railroad novels, Narita wanted to create a character that did not act as he looked. So, he placed a large facial tattoo on Jacuzzi Splot, a shy cry-baby. However, Narita never planned for the tattoo to have a meaningful past until he actually wrote the book. As he tried to design Nice Holystone, he wanted an appearance that left a strong impression and designed her with an eyepatch. Upon realizing that many characters sport an eyepatch, Narita decided to have the character wear her eyeglasses over the eyepatch. Other than the source for her appearance, he does not know the inspiration for her obsession with explosives. He also notes that the two novels introduce the series' "number one problem child" Claire Stanfield. He remarks that Claire moves too much by himself (more so than Isaac Dian and Miria Harvent) and changed the entire plot of the novels; for example, all of the Russo and Lemure were supposed to have died. Although Claire is the series' most popular character, Narita will not write a novel featuring him as the protagonist because he believes that the story would end very quickly without any excitement. While writing, Narita did not plan to become attached to Chane, and she was killed in the original draft. However, the author became fond of her, and she survived. Narita comments that Ladd Russo was easier to move around than Claire. He also states that Ladd is his favorite character, and he would often refer back to Ladd's dialogue to raise his spirits.

=== Casting ===
Tyler Walker, the ADR director of the English dub of the series, comments that because there are a lot of characters and most of them are older men, a character type he does not work with often, choosing voice actors and familiarizing them with their characters was difficult. He asked many directors and actors for recommendations and mainly aimed to cast newcomers, as he felt Baccano! provided him a chance to discover newer talent. Walker wished to find actors who could provide the dialect and accents of the various time periods and locations, especially when casting for the characters with heavy European accents. Walker held auditions for six days, during which about 140 people came for the eighteen main roles. He states that this was probably the longest casting process Funimation has held.

== Daily Days ==
The Daily Days (デイリー・デイズ, Deirī Deizu; often abbreviated DD) is an information company based in Chinatown that uses its newspaper as a front for information gathering. They gather information by paying visitors, ranging from shopkeepers to mafiosi, and by selling information in exchange for more information. They also employ various people to collect information for them, such as Rachel, who supply the company with information about the incident aboard the Flying Pussyfoot. Many visitors are received at the front desk by Nicholas Wayne or Elean Duga.

=== President ===
The president is the unseen head of the Daily Days. His office is filled with paper and the sound of ringing phones. His age is unknown due to the large mountain of papers on his desk, but he is described as having a young voice, and was seen by one of his employees who offered him a sugar cube, much to the shock of the two other employees in the office. Important visitors, such as Keith Gandor, are received in his office. He comes off as very wise and polite, often chastising Nicholas when he kept poking fun at fellow employee, Rachel. Although he employs many people to gather information for him, the president seems to know about the situation before they report to him and often knows more than those who witnessed the event. He is voiced by Shō Hayami in the Japanese version and Cole Brown in the English version.

=== Rachel ===
Rachel (レイチェル, Reicheru) is an information broker for the Daily Days. Originally, she was the daughter of a railroad engineer that was disgraced after a horrible accident that wasn't his fault. Seeing her father's love for a profession that had rejected him made an impression upon Rachel, and is loath to see anyone hurt as a result of anyone on a train. She had saved Natalie and Mary Beriam during the attack of the Lemures gang during their attack of the Flying Pussyfoot, as well as confronting a blood-covered Claire during his rampage. Although she often rides trains, she does so as a stowaway, never paying her fare. She is voiced by Shizuka Itou in Japanese and Trina Nishimura in English.

=== Gustav St. Germain and Carol ===
Gustav St. Germain (ギュスターヴ・サンジェルマン, Gyusutāvu Sanjeruman) is the vice president of the Daily Days. He and his assistant Carol work primarily on incidents involving the immortals. Gustav seems very interested in stories, and gives Carol "points" for answering rhetorical questions, although Carol is eternally confused by how much these are worth. Carol eventually becomes world-famous during the 2000s. Gustav is voiced by Norio Wakamoto in Japanese and Kent Williams in English. Carol is voiced by Chiwa Saito in Japanese and Kristin Sutton in English.

=== Nicholas Wayne ===
Nicholas Wayne (ニコラス・ウェイン, Nikorasu Wein) is the receptionist of the Daily Days. Nicholas originally worked for a military intelligence unit and he taught the employees to use guns, allowing the company to gain enough power to compete with surrounding organizations. Nicholas will sell information to anyone willing to pay the price, regardless of who they are or who else might know the information. His intentions often get the better of him. Because of the nature of their business, thanks to Nicholas the editorial department situated behind the front desk is exceptionally well armed at all times. Nicholas is shown to be very much devious, bribing everyone that comes inside to get his way. Nicholas is voiced by Tohru Furusawa in Japanese and Christopher Bevins in English.

=== Elean Duga ===
Elean Duga (エレアン・ドゥーガー, Erean Dūgā) is an employee at the Daily Days. Along with Nicholas, he helps Eve Genoard in her search for Dallas. Unlike Nicholas, Elean is typically eager to help people; however, he also shows a sign of cowardice. Elean is voiced by Taiten Kusunoki in Japanese and by Daniel Drumm in English.

== Isaac Dian and Miria Harvent ==
Isaac Dian (アイザック・ディアン, Aizakku Dian) and Miria Harvent (ミリア・ハーヴェント, Miria Hāvento) are a pair of idiotic lovers who work as thieves. Isaac attributes their success to the eccentricity of their good-intentioned crimes, such as stealing watches to steal time or stealing the front door of a museum to prevent anyone from opening the door and entering. They wear a variety of costumes when committing crimes, leading witnesses to assume they are performers. Miria wholeheartedly believes and supports everything Isaac says and often mimics his body language and speech, although she often does not really understand what he is saying. The pair are oblivious to their surroundings, but hold a great affection for the people they meet and believe the best of them. They become immortal in 1930 after mistaking the elixir for a bottle of alcohol. In 1934, Isaac and Miria are confronted by plainclothes officers. Isaac realizes Miria is unaware of this and sends her away without informing her. He is arrested for multiple thefts and imprisoned on Alcatraz Island. Isaac is released later in the year and reunites with Miria in Chicago. They never realized they were immortal until the year 2001. Isaac is voiced by Masaya Onosaka in Japanese and J. Michael Tatum in English. Miria is voiced by Sayaka Aoki in Japanese and Caitlin Glass in English. In the English dub of Durarara!!, where the characters make a cameo, Isaac and Miria are played by Sam Riegel and Jennie Kwan respectively.

== Gandor family ==
The Gandor family is a small mafia family based in Little Italy, Manhattan. The family is run by three brothers, Keith, Berga and Luck Gandor, who inherited the family from their father and are known for their ruthlessness and fighting ability. Their subordinates are known for becoming violent over slight disagreements. The family refuses to deal in drugs because the brothers possess varying degrees of aversion to them. The family makes money through the illegal distribution of alcohol, underground horse race betting, and various casinos. The family's headquarters is found in the basement of a small jazz hall. Because Luck and the Gandor's adoptive brother Claire Stanfield befriended Firo Prochainezo of the Martillo family as children, the two families are friendly with one another. Other members of the family include Tick Jefferson, Maria Barcelito, and Nicola Casetti (ニコラ・カセッティ, Nikora Kasetti). The Gandor operates on a similar scale as the Martillo family and controls about the same amount of territory.

=== Gandor brothers ===
Keith (キース, Kīsu), Berga (ベルガ, Beruga) and Luck are brothers who manage the small Gandor (ガンドール, Gandōru) mafia family in Manhattan. However, the three are described as ill-suited to mafia life. The three become immortal in 1930 after mistaking an immortality elixir for a bottle of alcohol.

==== Keith Gandor ====
The eldest Keith acts as the boss and the family's protector. He holds an "old-fashioned" mafia ideas and always wants justice to be served. However, Claire believes that out of the three brothers, Keith is the only one who is fit to be a mafiosi. Keith wears a perpetual scowl and rarely speaks; the Daily Days will waive their fee for information in exchange for a few of his words. He is married to Kate, who was a piano player for silent films and became unemployed when silent films fell out of favor. However, Keith enjoyed listening to her play. Once the two became acquainted and she learned more about him, she wanted to play the piano for him. She is the only one who can have him say more than a sentence, but only on occasion. She is completely aware that he runs a mafia family.

==== Berga Gandor ====
Berga is the second-in-command and is tasked with inspiring terror of the Gandor family. He is described as an idiot, but he does not hesitate to do his job. It is said if he were smarter, he could control the Gandor by himself through terror and violence. He is the strongest of the three brothers and is volatile and easily angered. Berga is married to a woman named Kali. The three consider Claire Stanfield, who was adopted into the Gandor at a young age, as their fourth brother. Berga is voiced by Kenta Miyake in Japanese and Phil Parsons in English.

==== Luck Gandor ====
Luck (ラック, Rakku) is about twenty, making him the youngest of the three brothers. Despite this, he possess social and calculative skills rare for his age; as a result, he is the third-in-command and devises the Gandor's strategies and plans-of-action. He only joined the mafia because his father and brothers were mafiosi, and he felt obligated to become one too. He is having trouble adjusting to life as an immortal and, of the three brothers, is thought to be the least suited for the mafia life. Luck is aware of this and acts ruthlessly in an attempt to convince himself otherwise. He speaks politely, no matter who he is talking to. He seems to be always calm and collected and is always wearing a faint smile; however, the smile is simply a front as Luck is described as a cold and ruthless person. Although his expression remains calm, he can become extremely angry and often becomes angrier than his brothers in situations. Because of his immortality, he lost his passion for life and his duty and often feels no emotion. He states that after gaining immortality he completely changed into a "rational and benign" person. When he does feel emotion, his actions are often controlled by them. Luck is good friends with many of his subordinates; when four of them are killed by Dallas Genoard, Luck becomes extremely angry and admits that if he did not control himself, he would have gone out to find Dallas and killed the police and citizens who stood in his way. Because of this, Luck asks his larger brother Berga to hit or kill him if he attempted such a rampage. Because Firo and Luck grew up on the same block, the two are close friends and, as a result, the Gandor and Martillo families are on friendly terms. He is voiced by Takehito Koyasu in Japanese and Jason Liebrecht in English.

=== Tick Jefferson ===
Tick Jefferson (チック・ジェファーソン, Chikku Jefāson) is the family's scissor-wielding torture technician. In 1925, his stepfather owed money to the Gandor and several other groups. His stepfather was unable to pay everything back and planned to run away with Tock, Tick's younger brother. Tick was seen as a nuisance and sold to Luck, who is only a couple of years older. Tick was aware of the situation his family was in and agreed to pay the debt in full if he did not prove himself useful to the Gandor. A year after being sold to the Gandor, Tick became feared throughout the surrounding gangs. Since his childhood, he has carried two scissors that are 2 feet (0.61 m) long and enjoyed cutting various objects. Because of this, the Gandor find him strange and tend to keep their distance. Only Maria feels comfortable around him and talks to him constantly. He is described as a truly kind-hearted man and an incarnation of innocence. Although Luck believes Tick does not have any qualities of a mafiosi, Luck also believes Tick's only talent is inflicting pain. When he speaks, he often drags out the vowels, increasing his childlike qualities. Tick is voiced by Kappei Yamaguchi in Japanese and Adam Dapkus in English.

=== Maria Barcelito ===
Maria Barcelito (マリア・バルセリート, Maria Baruserīto) is a Mexican samurai who uses two katana. She is one of many assassins hired by the Runorata to kill Claire, but she is no match for her target. Afterward, she witnesses Keith protect her assassin's pride and takes Luck's offer to join the family. She is the Gandor's only female member and is considered a freeloader. Maria is easily excited and as an ex-assassin, she enjoys fighting and cannot stand jobs where there is little chance of conflict. As a result, she often damages many of the family's sources of income. However, she only listens to Keith (who is unlikely to discipline her), and Berga feels it is better to let her do what she wants. Luck is left to control her, much to his annoyance. She is very friendly and calls everyone, including Luck and her targets, amigo, Spanish for friend. Although the family wishes she had a different personality, they are extremely confident in her abilities. She gets along well with Tick as they both share a similar fascination with 'sharp' objects, hers being katanas and Tick's being scissors.

=== Edith ===
Edith is a speakeasy waitress for the Gandors and girlfriend of drug addict Roy Maddock. She has an impressionable love for newspapers and opts to join the Daily Days someday. She becomes entangled in the Gandors' feud with the Runorattas after her boyfriend steals a suitcase of drugs and causes an accident. She eventually sells out to the Gandors to protect Roy but as consequence, Tick cuts her hair off as the Gandors do not follow the strict codes of the mafia for insubordination. She seeks Claire's help in securing information to save herself and Roy but eventually the turf war ends at the near cost of Roy's life. She remains friends and a close associate of the Gandors after the incident. Due to the dark plot related to drugs and the brutal nature of the 4th novel, she and Roy's storyline was omitted from the anime and Roy's roles were mostly overtaken by Dallas Genorad.

== Genoard family ==
=== Dallas Genoard ===
Dallas Genoard (ダラス・ジェノアード, Darasu Jenoādo) is a small-time thug and the older brother of Eve Genoard, whom he treasures above all. After Isaac and Miria steal the Genoard family fortune, he begins a string of robberies with his friends and gets involved with Szilard's plans. He and his friends are made partially immortal, meaning they still age. The group is captured by the Gandor and are cemented into barrels at the bottom of the Hudson River as punishment for killing Gandor members. Eve dredges the river to find Dallas. However, after Dallas and his friends are dredged from the river in 1933, Dallas is promptly abducted by Lamia, a group who serves Huey Laforet. Although he forgets the names of his two friends, he can easily recall the names of his enemies. Dallas treats others with disrespect and is extremely disliked as a result. Despite this, he is extremely attached to his sister and will do anything to ensure her safety. He is voiced by Atsushi Imaruoka in Japanese and Ian Sinclair in English.

=== Eve Genoard ===
Eve Genoard (イブ・ジェノアード, Ibu Jenoādo) is Dallas' younger sister and a member of New Jersey's wealthy Genoard family. Despite her quiet personality and aristocratic upbringing, Eve has very little fear of the New York streets, going directly against the mafia as she searches for her brother. She even vows revenge when she believes he is dead. Although she goes to great lengths to find him, she admits that she never liked her brother because of his behavior. At first, she reprimands Luck for not forgiving Dallas. She later apologizes when she learns Gustavo of the Runorata family killed her father and other brother. She finds herself unable to forgive him for it and attempts to kill him. She is unaware that her family became wealthy selling drugs to the Runorata and believes that they made their money through the textile industry, which is in fact only a front. However, her father and eldest brother were unable to reach an agreement with the Runorata and were killed. She allows Isaac and Miria to steal all of their money, hoping that the family will stop fighting over it. She is very religious, often praying in the most hopeless of situations. Eve is voiced by Marina Inoue in Japanese and Jad Saxton in English.

== Immortals ==
The immortals (不死者, fushisha) are a group of people who attained immortality, stopped aging and became impervious to injury after drinking an immortality elixir. All immortals must follow a set of rules and guidelines. Although they are able to use a false name for temporary introductions to mortals, their bodies reject all attempts to establish lasting false identities. In addition, they must use their real names when speaking to another immortal. Immortals can transmit information and images to another immortal by placing their right hand on the other's head and thinking about the information or image. To kill an immortal, another immortal must "devour" them by placing their right hand on the other's head and thinking "I wish to eat." In addition, the more often an immortal is injured in a certain way, the faster they will recover from that injury.

The original immortals were a group of about thirty alchemists who were traveling aboard the ship Advenna Avis in 1711. Aboard the ship, they summoned a demon in the hopes of gaining immortality. They are successful and the demon gives them the immortality elixir. Their leader Maiza Avaro is given the formula for the elixir. Later, the group decides they must keep immortality to themselves. Szilard Quates disagrees and devours thirteen of the alchemists, obtaining half of the formula Maiza gave to his brother. Realizing the danger Szilard poses to them, they scatter throughout the world. Szilard devours five more of original immortals, bringing the total to eighteen, before he himself is devoured.

A second group of immortals is created in 1930 after Szilard manages to recreate the elixir, but he loses possession of it. After it is passed around Manhattan by gangsters believing it is alcohol, Isaac Dian and Miria Harvent, the three Gandor brothers, Firo Prochainezo and all of the Martillo executives drink it at a party.

Those who drank Szilard's incomplete immortality elixir become partially immortal. Although they can be killed through devouring, they do not stop aging and will eventually die of old age.

=== Elmer Albatross ===
Elmer C. Albatross (エルマー・C・アルバトロス, Erumā C. Arubatorosu) is one of the original immortals. He is unnaturally optimistic about everything and is always smiling. Born at about 1700, Elmer was a member of a cult and was meant to be a sacrifice. Because he was respectful and believed in love, he was bullied. However, when his cult became the subject of various witch-hunts, he happily defended them. He admits that he does not know what happiness is or if he is smiling due to happiness, but Elmer has made it his goal in life to make everyone happy. Elmer is the only being Huey does not see as a test subject and is Huey's only friend. He is voiced by Shintarou Oohata in Japanese and John Burgmeier in English.

=== Beg Garrott ===
Beg Garrott (ベグ・ガロット, Begu Garotto) is one of the original immortals. In 1932, he creates drugs for New Jersey's Runorata mafia family and has become a drug addict himself. Because of his constant drug use, he talks in halting tones, often pausing between syllables. He starts creating and using drugs that induce complete happiness; however, a form ten times more powerful cannot induce happiness in an immortal. By August 2002, Beg is placed in a mental hospital in New Jersey, oblivious to reality and reliving the happiest time of his life: being aboard the ship with Czeslaw. The only people he trusts are the original immortals and Bartolo Runorata, the boss of the Runorata.

=== Sylvie Lumiere ===
Sylvie Lumiere (シルヴィ・リュミエール, Shiruvi Ryumiēru) is one of the original immortals. She is the only passenger who does not immediately drink the elixir and instead saves it for when she is older and "more refined". She was the lover of Maiza's brother Gretto. By 1930, she became a singer, often singing in speakeasies. In the 1970s, she joins Maiza, Czeslaw and Nile on the search for Elmer in a mysterious European village. Sylvie is depicted with white hair and is often described as very beautiful. She is voiced by Ayahi Takagaki in Japanese and Leah Clark in English.

=== Nile ===
Nile (ナイル, Nairu) is one of the original immortals. He initially had no fear of death because he cannot die and eventually forgot that other people die. After watching his comrades killed in action during several wars, he realized that this is the first time he suffered. He then became terrified and later, emotionless. Nile also seems to be easily provoked into violence. In 2001, he joins Maiza, Czeslaw and Sylvie on their search for Elmer in a strange European village. By the next year, he is in Japan and receives an invitation from Huey to board the cruise ship Exit to the United States. After the hijacking of the ship and its sister ship the Entrance, Nile is detained in the United States. It was revealed he battled against Shizuo Heiwajima from Durarara!! and lost to the latter's brute strength during his stay in Ikebukuro. Nile is voiced by Kouichi Sakaguchi in Japanese and by Bob Carter in English.

=== Szilard Quates ===
Szilard Quates (セラード・クェーツ, Serādo Kwētsu) is an alchemist who became immortal in 1711 aboard the Advenna Avis and is described as the most evil alchemist on the ship. He disagreed with the majority's decision to keep the immortality elixir to themselves and kills many of the original immortals. He takes Maiza Avaro's brother, Gretto, and devours him, hoping to receive the immortality elixir's formula. Because Maiza had given his brother only half of the formula, Szilard is only able to obtain that much. Szilard uses the incomplete formula to create an elixir that bestows partial immortality, meaning that the recipient will still age. He also creates several homunculi from his own cells, the latest of which is the female Ennis. Although he has the body of an old man, he is exceptionally fast and strong and is capable of defeating most opponents in physical combat. Szilard is voiced by Kinryū Arimoto in Japanese and R Bruce Elliott in English.

=== Victor Talbot ===
Victor Talbot (ヴィクター・タルボット, Vikutā Tarubotto) is one of the original immortals. By the 1930s, he has become an FBI agent and heads the department who works mainly with immortal-related cases. He strongly dislikes the mafiosi, Camorristi and other outlaws and is the one who arrests Huey Laforet on the basis that he's a traitor/terrorist to the U.S. and imprisoned him on Alcatraz Island in 1931. Later in 1934 he captures and imprisons Firo Prochainezo also placing him on Alcatraz Island.

=== Denkurō Tōgō ===
Denkurō Tōgō (東郷 田九郎, Tōgō Denkurō) is one of the original immortals. He is described as a "ninja" by Elmer. In 1705, he is a Japanese alchemist who visits a private school on what is now the Italian Peninsula to investigate drugs use and illegal money. He becomes involved in the Cold War and is unable to return home until the fall of the Berlin Wall. After Huey invites him to board a cruise ship travelling from Japan to the United States, the Exit, the sister ship of the Entrance, Denkurō is detained upon his arrival into the United States. He is voiced by Atsushi Ono in Japanese.

=== Czeslaw Meyer ===
Czeslaw Meyer (チェスワフ・メイエル, Chesuwafu Meieru), nicknamed Czes (チェス, Chesu), is a young boy who gained immortality aboard the Advenna Avis in 1711. After he and his guardian Fermet gained immortality, Fermet tortured Czeslaw, claiming to be testing the limits of immortality. Czeslaw manages to devour Fermet, ending his suffering. However, he realizes that there is no "love", only deception, and that other immortals will eventually come to devour him. He becomes paranoid and trusts no one, making it his mission to devour other immortals before they can devour him. He cares little for the lives of others, even requesting that a large group of people be killed so he could find an immortal among them. In 1931, after being forgiven by Maiza, he stops hunting other immortals and lives with Ennis as her little brother. He is voiced by Akemi Kanda in Japanese and Maxey Whitehead in English.

==== Lebreau Fermet Viralesque ====
Labro Fermet Viraresuku (ラブロ・フェルメート・ヴィラレスク, Raburo Ferumēto Viraresuku) is a young man, who before gaining immortality aboard the Advenna Avis, was a guardian to Czeslaw Meyer. After gaining immortality, he became sick and sadistic, trapping Czeslaw to a bed and torturing him endlessly, trying to find a way, if any, for them to die and how human they were afterwards. After an unknown amount of time, Czeslaw supposedly killed Fermet, though this was later discovered to be inaccurate. As in 2002 it had been discovered that he was alive the entire time, and the grand master of all that had happened in the novels and overall villain of the series. Besides Czeslaw, it is known that he survived at least one other devouring, though who attempted this is unknown.

== Jacuzzi and Nice's gang ==
=== Jacuzzi Splot ===
Jacuzzi Splot (ジャグジー・スプロット, Jagujī Supurotto) is an extremely shy and polite gang leader and bootlegger along with Nice, whom he has known since their childhood. He has gelled back brown hair with wisps of it falling into his face, and large brown eyes. His attire consists of a white button up shirt under a brown plaid vest, and long brown pants. Most of the time Jacuzzi wears an expression of fear, and is often seen crying. Regarding personality, Jacuzzi is easily scared but is capable of exceptional courage and leadership ability when the situation calls for it. He is also known to be very trusting of others, such as when he befriends Chane despite knowing nothing about her, which Nice states is the reason they are always at a loss, but also why he has so many loyal friends around him. He often stutters and dislikes attention. Despite this, he has a large sword tattoo on his face, which he got when Nice was seriously injured in an explosives accident, so that they would both be similarly marked and she would feel less ashamed about her scars. However, when his friends are in danger, he will summon the strength to face his problems directly, even though he will continue to cry. He claims that he cries so he does not have any tears left to shed when he needs to be courageous. When he realizes he cries too much, he states that the extra tears are for Nice, so that she does not have to cry if something bad happens. Jacuzzi is voiced by Daisuke Sakaguchi in Japanese and Joel McDonald in English.

=== Nice Holystone ===
Nice Holystone (ニース・ホーリーストーン, Nīsu Hōrīsutōn) is an explosive expert who makes high-grade explosives but has a mellow disposition. She lost her right eye and gained extensive scarring on her body during an accident with homemade explosives when she was young, but she still carries bombs hidden underneath her clothing for difficult situations. She and Jacuzzi are childhood friends and kissed for the first time aboard the Flying Pussyfoot train, despite having already dated for ten years. In 2002, the pair have a great-grandson named Bobby. Nice is voiced by Yu Kobayashi in Japanese and Colleen Clinkenbeard in English.

=== Chane Laforet ===
Chane Laforet (シャーネ・ラフォレット, Shāne Raforetto) is the daughter of Huey Laforet and is an excellent knife fighter. She joins her father's followers, the Lemures, in hijacking the Flying Pussyfoot train, despite disapproving of such acts. She communicates telepathically with Huey and, because she is mute, she communicates with others through her body language and written notes. She believes that her father is the only person to ever love her and is so devoted to him that, when offered to receive something in exchange for keeping Huey's secrets, she asked him to take her voice so that she would never betray him. After Claire Stanfield proposes to her aboard the Flying Pussyfoot, she tells him she will wait for him forever in Manhattan, intending to kill him. Chane is unsure how she should interpret the kindness she receives from Jacuzzi Splot and his gang, and is confused by Claire's continued professions of love. The time she spends with Jacuzzi and Claire changes her into a more open and straightforward person, and her world expands past the one that included only herself and Huey. She eventually falls in love with Claire, marrying him and adopting his new last name, Walken. She is voiced by Ryō Hirohashi in Japanese and Monica Rial in English.

== Huey Laforet and followers ==
=== Huey Laforet ===
Huey Laforet (ヒューイ・ラフォレット, Hyūi Raforetto) is one of the original immortals. When the group votes on whether to keep immortality a secret, Huey abstains from voting. He is a self-described "observer" and has been described by Sylvie as the most terrifying alchemist on the ship. He will do anything as long as he knows how to do it or receives instructions. He considers everyone as a possible experiment, with the exception of Elmer, and conducts constant experiments on people, including children. Huey has created incomplete homunculi, and his daughter Chane was an experiment to find if acquired immortality can be inherited. In the 1930s, Huey is arrested for treason and conspiracy and is incarcerated in a Newfoundland prison until he is moved to Alcatraz Island in 1931. He has several cults dedicated to serving him, including the Lemures and the Lamia. The Lemures go to great lengths to end his imprisonment, such as taking the Flying Pussyfoot's passengers hostage, but only wish to gain immortality. Huey does not agree with their actions and is aware of their intentions. Huey also has a daughter named Leeza and a son named Lucino B. Campanella. He is voiced by Susumu Chiba in Japanese and Eric Vale in English.

=== Lamia ===
The Lamia (吸血鬼, Ramia; lit Vampire) is a group of homunculi created by Huey Laforet. They serve and are completely dedicated to Huey. The group is led by Tim (ティム, Timu), who was born Tock Jefferson (タック・ジェファーソン, Takku Jefāson) as Tick's younger brother. As a child, Tock ran away from his father after Tick was sold, and Huey Laforet took him in. These homunculi, referred to vampires, are imperfect; they do not age, but they can be killed. The homunculi include Christopher Shaldred (クリスタファー・シャルドレード, Kurisutofā Sharudorēdo), Hong Chimei "Chi", Rail, Frank, Sickle, The Poet, Leeza Laforet and Adele (アデル, Aduru).

=== Lemures ===
The Lemures (幽霊, Remureisu; lit. Ghost) is a cult that follows Huey Laforet. The cult is headed by a man named Goose. Although they claim to be completely dedicated to Huey, to the point that they hijack the Flying Pussyfoot to negotiate his release, they are only after the secret to immortality. The cult refers to themselves as "Lemures" or "ghosts" in order to symbolize that they no longer consider themselves part of the living. Other members include Huey's daughter Chane and Spike who appears to be Goose's right-hand man. While hijacking the train they plan to kill Chane because she would get in the way of their plans to get the secret of immortality from Huey. Most of the members are killed aboard the Pussyfoot.

== Martillo family ==
The Martillo family (マルティージョ・ファミリー, Marutījo famirī) is a very small Camorrista family based in Little Italy, Manhattan. They rely on informal banking services, commercial trade and casinos for income. One of the most important sources of financial support is their speakeasy the Alveare (アルヴェアーレ, Aruveāre; Italian beehive). After the Prohibition is lifted, the Alveare remains their main source of financial support as a restaurant featuring various dishes made with honey and a honey specialty shop. Eventually, the restaurant became extremely popular and a chain of restaurants is opened. The Martillo family boss adopts Firo Prochainezo into the family. Other members include the treasurer Maiza Avaro and secretary Ronny Schiatto. Ronny is also an incarnation of the demon who granted immortality to the alchemists. Because Firo grew up with Luck Gandor and Claire Stanfield of the Gandor family, the two families are on friendly terms. Most of the Martillo become immortal in 1930 after mistaking a bottle of the immortality elixir for celebratory alcohol while celebrating Firo's promotion within the organization. Inspector Edward Noah believes that the family is not worth investigating and states that the only reason it has not been taken over by larger neighboring families is because they are such a powerless family. When promoting someone to the rank of an executive, Don Molsa Martillo notifies the man in advance and has another executive go with him to buy a suitable hat. This practice has no particular meaning. When accepting men into his family, Molsa gives no preference for nationality, therefore the family is made up of men from many backgrounds.

=== Maiza Avaro ===
Maiza Avaro (マイザー・アヴァーロ, Maizā Avāro) is the bookkeeper of the Martillo Camorra family and is one of the original group of immortals. Because he is the alchemist who leads the others in summoning the demon aboard the ship Advenna Avis (アドウェナ・アウィス, Adowena Awisu) in 1711, he is the only one given the knowledge of the immortality elixir's formula. He gives his younger brother Gretto (グレット, Guretto) knowledge of a portion of the elixir's formula. Soon after, Szilard Quates devours Gretto in order to attain that knowledge. Although he is a member of the Martillo Camorra family, Maiza does not advocate violence. He is constantly seen smiling. In the 1970s, he leaves his post as bookkeeper to Firo. Afterwards he and Czeslaw travel the world searching for immortals to bring them together again since Szilard no longer poses a threat. He returns to the Martillo in 2001. He is voiced by Mitsuru Miyamoto in Japanese and Sean Hennigan in English.

=== Firo Prochainezo ===
Firo Prochainezo (フィーロ・プロシェンツォ, Fīro Puroshentso) is one of the youngest members of Manhattan's Martillo Camorra family and is a skilled fighter. He was orphaned when he was ten and picked up by the head of the Martillo family after Firo attempts to rob him. Because of this, he considers the Martillo to be his family. He is tasked with monitoring casinos to prevent cheating, and later manages those casinos after becoming an executive member of the family. In 1930, he mistakes the immortality elixir for alcohol and takes it. He later distributes the elixir at a party, becoming immortal himself. That year, he falls in love with Ennis and devours Szilard Quates, saving her and the new immortals. Despite the fact that she initially does not reciprocate his feelings, due to her underdeveloped emotional capabilities, they live together afterward and eventually marry. In 1934, he is arrested by Victor Talbot for the destruction of public property during the bombing of the skyscraper Mist Wall and is imprisoned on Alcatraz Island. When Maiza Avaro leaves the Martillo in the 1970s, Firo is given the position as the family's bookkeeper until Maiza returns. During this time, Firo wears glasses in an attempt to look smarter. Because he is friends with Luck Gandor and Claire Stanfield, the Martillo and Gandor families are on friendly terms. Firo is voiced by Hiroyuki Yoshino in Japanese and Todd Haberkorn in English.

=== Ronny Schiatto ===
Ronny Schiatto (ロニー・スキアート, Ronī Sukiāto) is a high-ranking executive and secretary of the Martillo family despite his apparent youth. He is revealed to be the incarnation of the demon summoned in 1711 by alchemists hoping to obtain immortality. He gives them an immortality elixir and a set of guidelines. He also teaches the alchemists how to kill and absorb the knowledge of other immortals so he will obtain the knowledge of all thirty alchemists when the last one tires of living. However, he grants their request because he expected something to happen. He exhibits a deep curiosity, disguising himself as human to follow some immortals and not stopping second group of people from drinking the elixir because he could not imagine what would happen next. Ronny states that he is not a demon, but rather an alchemist from ancient times that learned too much. In both forms, he is fond of saying "Ah, never mind" (まあいい, maa ii), which he has identified as a "pet phrase" of his. Ronny is voiced by Nobutoshi Canna in Japanese and Chuck Huber in English.

=== Ennis ===
Ennis (エニス, Enisu) is a homunculus created by Szilard using his cells and the cells of an abducted female. She is the latest in a group of homunculi Szilard created, and she is the only female. Although she was "born" without any knowledge, she eventually begins to experience emotions. Although Ennis hates Szilard, she obeys his every order because he is able to kill her with a thought. She highly regrets these actions, but is encouraged by an oblivious Isaac and Miria (whom she accidentally hits with her car) to put those thoughts aside and look to the future, radically changing her outlook in life. She betrays Szilard and gives Firo Prochainezo the necessary knowledge to destroy Szilard. She falls in love with Firo and marries him in the 1980s after developing her emotions for fifty years, and also adopts Czeslaw as her younger brother due to a misconception by Isaac and Miria that she wanted one. Ennis is voiced by Sanae Kobayashi in Japanese and Brina Palencia in English.

== Russo family ==
The Russo family is a mafia family based in Chicago. The family is led by Placido Russo (パラシド・ルッソ, Parashido Russo), who finds it hard to control his nephew Ladd Russo, the family's hitman. Ladd withdraws from the family when he decides to hijack the Flying Pussyfoot simply for the carnage it will create. Other members of the family include Graham Specter, a mechanic and Ladd's loyal follower and Ricard Russo.

=== Ladd Russo and Lua Klein ===
Ladd Russo (ラッド・ルッソ, Raddo Russo) is a sadistic hitman for the Chicago Russo mafia family. He becomes excited at the thought of violence, so much so he dances in the blood of fallen allies. He is exceptionally skilled with firearms and in hand to hand combat, particularly boxing. Ladd is deeply in love with his fiancée Lua Klein (ルーア・クライン, Rūa Kurain) and expresses it through the promise of killing her slowly after he has killed everyone else. Lua is described as being very beautiful, but with eyes that are devoid of life and energy. She is completely devoted to Ladd and seems to take pleasure from his promise to kill her. He doesn't think of killing as something that involves good and evil. Rather, he does it guiding himself with his personal beliefs (often considered psychotic by many characters). Though he may seem to kill indiscriminately, he has preference (often seen in the form of hate) for those that think they cannot die or feel safe from death, or simply those who don't know their place in the world. Ladd is imprisoned in Alcatraz for killing many of the passengers aboard the Flying Pussyfoot, despite the fact that he maintains his actions were in self-defense. He loses his left arm during the "Flying Pussyfoot" incident, which is replaced by a prosthetic, metallic arm, which is directly linked to his bone, something that could end up killing him if he is not careful. In his stay on Alcatraz, he befriends Isaac and Firo. When Firo asks him if Isaac irritates him enough to want him dead, Ladd answers that Isaac is simply stupid enough to not notice in what kind of trouble he is and thus, doesn't really get on his nerves. He also states that Firo, though immortal, is still aware and scared of death and starts liking him for that. His main objective in Alcatraz is to kill Huey Laforet. According to the series creator, Ladd is his favourite character. He is voiced by Keiji Fujiwara in Japanese and Bryan Massey in English. Lua is voiced by Eri Yasui in Japanese and Carrie Savage in English.

=== Ricardo Russo ===
Ricardo Russo (リカルド・ルッソ, Rikarudo Russo) a young orphaned member of the Russo family. Her real name is Lydia (リディア, Ridia), but she was mistaken for a boy and called Ricardo. She saves the life of Christopher Shaldred in 1933, and since 1934, she has been under his protection. Graham Specter later accompanies her too. She is the heir to the crime family in the wake of Placido being killed by Nebula.

=== Graham Specter ===
Graham Specter (グラハム・スペクター, Gurahamu Supekutā) is a mechanic and one of Ladd's loyal devotees, going so far as to refer to Ladd as an older brother. He is very talkative, speaks very quickly and often contradicts himself, sometimes in the same sentence. He always carries a large wrench and enjoys dismantling things, becoming angry if something prevents him from doing so. He develops a friendship with Lamia member Sickle and is also a follower of Ricardo's group till Ladd returns to the crime family. Graham is voiced by Tomokazu Sugita in Japanese and Chris Patton in English.

== Claire Stanfield ==
Claire Stanfield (クレア・スタンフィールド, Kurea Sutanfīrudo) is the legendary freelance assassin Vino (ヴィーノ, Vīno; Italian wine), who is hailed as the best in the world. The name Vino references the way he mutilates his targets, leaving them caked in a layer of blood and looking like they are soaked in wine. He was adopted into the Gandor family at a young age and is considered the fourth Gandor brother. Despite this, he is not part of the Gandor family. In 1925, Huey Laforet visited New York City in the hopes of meeting Claire, who he described as a genius, but Claire ran away from home to join the circus and became an acrobat. He uses the strength and agility he gained from his training in his trade. He is also nearly unstoppable in physical combat. His views on the world could be seen as solipsistic. In addition to being an assassin, he also works as a conductor aboard the transcontinental train the Flying Pussyfoot, making it easier for him to travel to his targets. When the train is hijacked, he assumes the identity of the Rail Tracer (レイル・トレーサー, Reiru Torēsā), a monster that eats train passengers, to kill the train hijackers and ensure the passengers' safety. He meets and proposes to Chane Laforet aboard the Flying Pussyfoot after the train incident. They meet again sometime in Manhattan with the gang of Jacuzzi Splot and Nice Holystone. He purchases the name Felix Walken (フェリックス・ウォーケン, Ferikkusu Wōken) from a retired assassin to fix the problem. His great-grandchildren are named Claudia and Charon Walken. Claire is voiced by Masakazu Morita in Japanese and Jerry Jewell in English.

== Merchandise ==
Several types of merchandise have been produced based on the likeness of the characters in the Baccano! series. Apparel such as clothing has been released. Other merchandise includes keychains, lanyards, mousepads and bookmarks.

== Reception ==
Daryl Surat, a host of the Anime World Order podcast, and special guest Mike Toole described the cast as motley, weird and quirky as well as inept, either comically, horrifically or both at the same time. They also felt that despite the large cast, it is easy to learn about the characters because they all acted and looked different. They commented that every character is insane and has their own kind of psychosis. The pair criticized the names of several characters, such as Luck and Berga Gandor, Jacuzzi Splot, and Nice Holystone, believing that they were ridiculous. They were disappointed with the accents present in the English dubbing of the series, believing they sounded fake. Anime News Network (ANN) commented that the English cast match the sound and delivery of the Japanese cast and that the script also matched the original well, differing only in the use of 1930 slang. The site also felt that Jerry Jewell was not cast well as Claire Stanfield, but believed Bryan Massey's, J. Michael Tatum's and Caitlin Glass' performances as Ladd Russo, Isaac Dian and Miria Harvent, respectively, were praiseworthy. They also believed that Maxey Whitehead was able to make Czeslaw Meyer sound "less like a girl" and was able to shift "effortlessly between innocent and not-so-innocent modes". Aside from occasional struggles to maintain accents, other performances were also commended for bringing their characters to life and giving a sense of period and attitude. ANN also believed that one of the biggest weakness of the Japanese dub was the actors' inability to duplicate the American tones and speech patterns of the period simply because they are Japanese. They stated that this made the original dubbing sound less authentic than the English.
