= 1912 in animation =

Events in 1912 in animation.

== Films released ==
- January – How a Mosquito Operates (United States)
- 27 October – The Cameraman's Revenge (Russia)

== Births ==
=== January ===
- January 12: Sara Berner, American actress (original voice of Andy Panda, Chilly Willy, Red in Tex Avery's Red Hot Riding Hood and Swing Shift Cinderella, the canary in King-Size Canary and the mother of WB's Beaky Buzzard, Nancy in the Tom & Jerry cartoon Baby Puss, Toots in Tom and Jerry, The Zoot Cat and The Mouse Comes to Dinner, Jerry in Anchors Aweigh, did celebrity voice impressions in several Disney and Warner Bros. Cartoons), (d. 1969).

=== February ===
- February 24: Jiří Trnka, Czech puppeteer, illustrator, animator and film director (The Czech Year, The Emperor's Nightingale, Prince Bayaya, Old Czech Legends, The Good Soldier Schweik, A Midsummer Night's Dream, The Cybernetic Grandma), (d. 1969).

=== April ===
- April 5: John Le Mesurier, English actor (narrator of Bod), (d. 1983).
- April 7: Jack Lawrence, American songwriter (Walt Disney Animation Studios), (d. 2009).
- April 12: Lillian Friedman Astor, American animator (Fleischer Brothers), (d. 1989).
- April 15: Libico Maraja, Italian illustrator, animator and comics artist (IMA Film), (d. 1983).
- April 16: John Halas, Hungarian-British animator, film producer and director (Halas & Batchelor, Animal Farm, music video of Love Is All by Roger Glover), (d. 1995).
- April 17: Arthur Humberstone, English animator and film director (Halas & Batchelor, worked on Animal Farm, Yellow Submarine, Watership Down, The Plague Dogs and The BFG), (d. 1999).
- April 30: Emery Hawkins, American animator (Walt Disney Company, Screen Gems, Walter Lantz, Warner Bros. Cartoons, MGM, UPA), (d. 1989).

=== May ===
- May 2: Marten Toonder, Dutch comics author and animator (Toonder Animation, Als Je Begrijpt WatIk Bedeol (The Dragon That Wasn't Or Was He?)), (d. 2005).
- May 11: Don Towsley, American animator (Walt Disney Company, Hanna-Barbera, Chuck Jones, Filmation), (d. 1986).

=== June ===
- June 11: James Algar, American film director, screenwriter, and producer (The Walt Disney Company), (d. 1998).
- June 15: Ernie Nordli, American animator, animation designer and lay-out artist (Walt Disney Company, Warner Bros. Cartoons, Hanna-Barbera), (d. 1968).
- June 23: Gerry Chiniquy, American animator and film director (Warner Bros. Cartoons, DePatie-Freleng Enterprises), (d. 1989).
- June 24: Brad Case, American animator (Walt Disney Animation, Walter Lantz, Warner Bros. Animation, Hanna-Barbera, DePatie-Freleng, Marvel Productions,...), (d. 2006).

=== July ===
- July 5:
  - Bob Matz, American animator (Warner Bros. Cartoons, DePatie-Freleng, Peanuts specials), (d. 2003).
  - Mack David, American lyricist and songwriter (co-writer of songs for Cinderella, Alice in Wonderland and the theme song to The Bugs Bunny Show), (d. 1993).
- July 15: Al Bertino, American animator (Charles Mintz, Walt Disney Company, UPA, Grantray-Lawrence Animation, Walter Lantz), (d. 1996).
- July 17: Art Linkletter, Canadian-American radio and television personality (portrayed himself in the prologue of The Snow Queen), (d. 2010).
- July 23: Jackson Beck, American actor (voice of Perry White in The New Adventures of Superman, the fox in Baby Huey cartoons, the father in Little Lulu, Buzzy the Crow in Herman and Katnip, continued voice of Bluto in the Popeye cartoons produced by Famous Studios, Brutus the Cat in Race For Your Life, Charlie Brown, narrator in G.I. Joe: A Real American Hero), (d. 2004).
- July 26: Buddy Clark, American singer (singer and narrator in Melody Time), (d. 1949).

=== August ===
- August 23:
  - Ed Benedict, American animator, character designer and lay-out artist (Walt Disney Studios, Walter Lantz, Tex Avery, Hanna-Barbera), (d. 2006).
  - Gene Kelly, American actor, singer, dancer, film director, producer and choreographer (danced with Jerry Mouse in Anchors Aweigh, choreographer consultant for Cats Don't Dance), (d. 1996).
- August 25: Ted Key, American animator/screenwriter (Peabody's Improbable History in Rocky & Bullwinkle) and comics artist, (d. 2008).
- August 27: Sam Singer, American film director and producer (The Adventures of Pow Wow, The Adventures of Paddy the Pelican, Bucky and Pepito), (d. 2001).

=== September ===
- September 1: Michael Lah, American animator and film director (Walt Disney Company, worked for Tex Avery), (d. 1995).
- September 5:
  - Frank Thomas, American animator (Walt Disney Animation Studios), (d. 2004).
  - Ray Gilbert, American lyricist (Song of the South, The Three Caballeros), (d. 1976).
- September 12: Henry Wilson Allen, aka Heck Allen, American novelist and animation writer (Barney Bear, worked for Tex Avery), (d. 1991).
- September 21: Chuck Jones, American animator, director and painter (Warner Bros. Cartoons, MGM Animation/Visual Arts, directed the animated scenes in Stay Tuned and Mrs. Doubtfire, creator of Timber Wolf), (d. 2002).

=== October ===
- October 5: Riley Thomson, American comics artist and animator (Warner Bros. Cartoons, Walt Disney Company), (d. 1960).
- October 6: Irving Dressler, American animator and comics artist (Fleischer Studios, Famous Studios, Hal Seeger), (d. 2003).
- October 11: Betty Noyes, American actress and singer (sang "Baby Mine" in Dumbo, voice of Lady Fish in The Incredible Mr. Limpet), (d. 1987).
- October 15: Bonnie Poe, American actress (continued voice of Betty Boop), (d. 1993).
- October 31: Ollie Johnston, American animator (Walt Disney Animation Studios), (d. 2008).

=== November ===
- November 11: Grant Simmons, American animator (Walt Disney Company, Warner Bros. Cartoons, MGM, Hanna-Barbera, UPA) and director (Mr. Magoo), (d. 1970).
- November 17: Jack Lescoulie, American actor (voice of Casper Caveman in Daffy Duck and the Dinosaur, Jack Bunny in Slap-Happy Pappy and Goofy Groceries), (d. 1987).
- November 23: George O'Hanlon, American actor (voice of George Jetson in The Jetsons), (d. 1989).

=== Specific date unknown ===
- Lenn Redman, American caricaturist, animator, novelist, poet, illustrator, comics artist, cartoonist and activist (Warner Bros. Cartoons, Walt Disney Company, Filmation, Hanna-Barbera), (d. 1987).
- Storm de Hirsch, American poet, film director and animator (Peyote Queen), (d. 2000).

== Deaths ==
=== May ===
- May 13: Agnes Deans Cameron, Canadian adventurer, educator, and travel writer, (the first white woman to reach the Arctic Ocean, Cameron then traveled extensively as a lecturer, showing magic lantern slides of her photographic images from her journey to the Arctic), dies at age 48.
