= List of stop motion films =

This is a list of films that showcase stop motion animation, and is divided into four sections: animated features, TV series, live-action features, and animated shorts. This list includes films that are not exclusively stop motion.

== Stop motion animated features ==
This section includes stop motion films with a duration of at least 40 minutes, following the definition of feature film given by the Academy of Motion Picture Arts and Sciences and other institutions, since it appears to be the generally accepted short/feature threshold.

=== Released ===
Year	Title	Country	Type	Length (minutes)
1917	El Apóstol	Argentina	Cutout	70
1926	The Adventures of Prince Achmed	Germany	Cutout	65
1927	Ein Rückblick in die Urwelt	Germany	Cutout	N/A
1937	The Tale of the Fox	France	Puppet	65
1937	The Seven Ravens	Germany	Puppet	53
1945	Handling Ships	UK	Puppet	70
1947	The Crab with the Golden Claws	Belgium	Puppet	75
1947	The Czech Year AKA A Treasury of Fairy-tales	Czechoslovakia	Puppet	75
1949	The Emperor's Nightingale	Czechoslovakia	Puppet	72
1949	Adventures of Esparadrapo	Spain	Puppet	60
1950	Prince Bayaya	Czechoslovakia	Puppet	87
1952	The Treasure of Bird Island	Czechoslovakia	Puppet	77
1953	Old Czech Legends	Czechoslovakia	Puppet	91
1954	Hansel and Gretel: An Opera Fantasy	USA	Puppet	72
1955	The Good Soldier Schweik	Czechoslovakia	Puppet	76
1956	The Heavenly Creation (Nebesnoe sozdanie)	Soviet Union	Puppet	44
1958	Beloved Beauty	USSR	Puppet	45
1959	A Midsummer Night's Dream	Czechoslovakia	Puppet	76
1961	The Strange Story of the Inhabitants of Schiltburg	East Germany	Puppet	73
1962	Heaven and Earth Magic	USA	Cutout	66
1962	Joseph The Dreamer	Israel	Puppet	90
1963	The Peacock Princess	China	Puppet	73
1964	Rudolph the Red-Nosed Reindeer	USA/Canada/Japan	Puppet	47
1964	The Girl With Long Hair	China	Puppet	N/A
1964	Lefty	USSR	Cutout	42
1965	Willy McBean and his Magic Machine	USA/Canada/Japan	Puppet	94
1966	Go There, Don't Know Where	USSR	Cutout	56
1966	Taro, the Son Of Dragon	Japan	Puppet	N/A
1966	Ballad of Smokey the Bear	USA	Puppet	60
1966	Thunderbirds Are Go	UK/USA	Puppet	93
1967	Heungbuwa Nolbu	South Korea	Puppet	67
1967	Mad Monster Party?	USA/Japan	Puppet	94
1967	The Kurohime Story	Japan	Puppet	N/A
1968	The Mighty Taro	Japan	Puppet	N/A
1968	Adam	West Germany	Cutout	79
1969	Hanako, The Elephant	Japan	Puppet	N/A
1970	Dougal and the Blue Cat	France	Puppet	82
1970	Santa Claus Is Comin' to Town	USA/Japan	Puppet	48
1971	Here Comes Peter Cottontail	USA/Japan	Puppet	55
1972	The Enchanted World of Danny Kaye: The Emperor's New Clothes	USA/Denmark/Japan	Puppet	60
1973	Fantastic Planet	France	Cutout	72
1974	The Year Without a Santa Claus	USA/Japan	Puppet	51
1974	Adventures of Sinbad the Sailor	Czechoslovakia	Cutout	88
1975	The Pinchcliffe Grand Prix	Norway	Puppet	88
1976	Rudolph's Shiny New Year	USA/Japan	Puppet	47
1977	The Easter Bunny Is Comin' To Town	USA/Japan	Puppet	50
1977	The Holiday of Disobedience	USSR	Puppet	48
1977	The Scrap and the Cloud	USSR	Cutout	55
1978	Kongjui & Patchui	South Korea	Puppet	73
1978	Krabat – The Sorcerer's Apprentice	Czechoslovakia/East Germany	Cutout	73
1978	La pobre viejecita	Colombia	Puppet	70
1979	Colargol, the Conqueror of Space	Poland	Puppet	67
1979	Jack Frost	USA/Japan	Puppet	48
1979	Nutcracker Fantasy	Japan/USA	Puppet	82
1979	Ubu et la Grande Gidouille	France	Cutout	80
1979	Rudolph and Frosty's Christmas in July	USA/Japan	Puppet	97
1980	Colargol and the Magic Suitcase	Poland	Puppet	75
1980	I Go Pogo	USA	Puppet	86
1980	Pinocchio's Christmas	USA/Japan	Puppet	49
1980	The Tale Of John and Marie	Czechoslovakia/USSR	Cutout	66
1981	Rennyo and His Mother	Japan	Puppet	93
1982	Adventures of Robinson Crusoe, a Sailor from York	Czechoslovakia/West Germany	Puppet	68
1982	Henry The Horse	USA/Mexico/Spain	Cutout	48
1982	The Flying Windmill	East Germany	Puppet	85
1982	Our House	USA	Cutout	67
1982	Chronopolis	France/Poland	Puppet	70
1982	The Adventures of Sam the Squirrel	Hungary	Puppet	82
1983	The Wind in the Willows	UK	Puppet	79
1983	Cristóbal Colón	Colombia	Puppet	63
1983	The Little Witch	Czechoslovakia/West Germany	Cutout	96
1983	Twice Upon a Time	USA	Cutout	75
1984	Saving Mother	China	Puppet	55
1985	The Adventures of Mark Twain AKA Comet Quest	USA	Clay	86
1985	The Life & Adventures of Santa Claus	USA/Japan	Puppet	50
1985	Odyssea	Czechoslovakia/East Germany	Cutout	72
1986	The Pied Piper of Hamelin	Czechoslovakia	Puppet	53
1986	Sophie's Place	USA	Cutout	86
1987	The Amazing Mr. Bickford	USA	Clay	60
1987	Long live Servatius!	Hungary	Puppet	64
1987	My Favourite Time	USSR	Cutout	80
1987	The Puppetoon Movie	USA	Puppet	80
1987	Papobo	Cuba	Puppet	50
1988	The Cat Who Walked by Herself	USSR	Mixed	
1988	Göyçak fatma	USSR	Cutout	46
1989	Santa Claus: The Baker Street	USA/UK	Cutout	68
1989	El escudo del cóndor	Argentina	Puppet	72
1989	A Tale of Two Toads	UK	Puppet	60
1990	The Trace Leads to the Silver Lake	East Germany	Puppet	80
1990	The Fool of the World and the Flying Ship	UK	Puppet	60
1990	The School of Fine Arts	USSR	Mixed	70
1990	The School of Fine Arts: The Return	USSR	Mixed	67
1992	Mitki-Mayer	Russia	Cutout	53
1993	The Nightmare Before Christmas	USA	Puppet	76
1993	Herzog Ernst	Germany	Cutout	45
1993	The Return of Captain Sinbad	USA	Puppet	45
1993	The Secret Adventures of Tom Thumb	UK	Puppet and pixilation	60
1995	Gumby: The Movie	USA	Clay	88
1996	James and the Giant Peach	USA/UK	Puppet	79
1996	Kings and Cabbage	Russia	Cutout	52
1996	The Ballad of the Viking King, Holger the Dane	Denmark	Puppet	82
1997	Jue jiang de Kailaban	China/Germany	Puppet	90
1997	Mamo, czy kury potrafią mówić?	Poland	Puppet	71
1998	Reise um die Erde in 80 Tagen	China/Germany	Puppet	90
1998	The Magic Pipe	Russia	Puppet	47
1999	Juego de niños	Spain	Clay	70
2000	The Miracle Maker	UK/Russia	Puppet	90
2000	Princes et Princesses	France	Cutout	70
2000	Chicken Run	UK/USA	Clay	84
2000	Prop and Berta	Denmark	Puppet	77
2000	Optimus Mundus	Russia	Mixed	56
2001	Tootletubs & Jyro	Finland	Puppet	65
2001	Bob the Builder: A Christmas to Remember	UK	Puppet	63
2002	Fimfárum Jana Wericha	Czech Republic	Puppet	100
2003	Winter Days	Japan	Puppet	100
2003	The Legend of the Sky Kingdom	Zimbabwe	Puppet	73
2003	Bob the Builder: The Knights of Can-A-Lot	UK	Puppet	44
2004	Davey and Goliath's Snowboard Christmas	USA	Clay	45
2004	Bob the Builder: Snowed Under	UK	Puppet	52
2004	Bob the Builder: When Bob Became a Builder	UK	Puppet	50
2005	Disaster!	USA	Puppet	83
2005	Klay World: Off the Table	USA	Clay	90
2005	Among the Thorns	Sweden	Cutout	46
2005	The Book of the Dead	Japan	Puppet	70
2005	Corpse Bride	USA/UK	Puppet	77
2005	Wallace & Gromit: The Curse of the Were-Rabbit	UK/USA	Clay	85
2005	The Three Musketeers	Denmark/Latvia	Puppet	75
2005	Bob the Builder: Bob's Big Plan	UK	Puppet	44
2006	Live Freaky! Die Freaky!	USA	Puppet	75
2006	Blood Tea and Red String	USA	Puppet	71
2006	Fimfárum 2	Czech Republic	Puppet	90
2006	Holidaze: The Christmas That Almost Didn't Happen	USA	Clay	60
2006	Desmond & the Swamp Barbarian Trap	Sweden	Puppet	68
2006	Bob the Builder: Built to be Wild	UK	Puppet	57
2006	Saving Mother	China	Puppet	79
2007	We Are the Strange	USA	Puppet	88
2007	One Night in One City	Czech Republic	Puppet	75
2007	Max & Co	Belgium/France/Switzerland/UK	Puppet	76
2007	Tengers	South Africa	Clay	68
2008	Davie & Golimyr	USA	Puppet	45
2008	$9.99	Australia	Puppet	78
2008	Moomin and Midsummer Madness	Finland/Austria/Poland	Puppet	88
2008	Edison and Leo	Canada	Puppet	79
2008	A Miser Brothers' Christmas	USA/Canada	Puppet	45
2008	Bob the Builder: Race to the Finish	UK	Puppet	61
2009	Coraline	USA	Puppet	100
2009	Mary and Max	Australia	Clay	92
2009	A Town Called Panic	Belgium/Luxembourg/France	Puppet	76
2009	Elemi	Japan	Puppet/Clay	46
2009	Fantastic Mr. Fox	USA/UK	Puppet	86
2009	Toys in the Attic	Czech Republic	Puppet	75
2010	Sky Song	Estonia	Puppet	45
2010	The Ugly Duckling	Russia	Puppet	75
2010	Jackboots on Whitehall	UK/Spain/Belgium	Puppet	91
2010	Cheburashka	Japan/Russia/South Korea	Puppet	79
2010	Moomins and the Comet Chase	UK/USA/Poland/Finland	Puppet	75
2010	The Puppet Monster Massacre	USA	Puppet	70
2010	The Sandman and the Lost Sand of Dreams	Germany/France	Puppet	83
2011	Fimfarum: The Third Time Lucky	Czech Republic	Puppet	75
2011	Spot and Splodge on the Spot	Sweden	Puppet	44
2012	The Pirates! In an Adventure with Scientists!	UK/USA	Clay	88
2012	ParaNorman	USA	Puppet	93
2012	The Apostle	Spain	Puppet	80
2012	Consuming Spirits	USA	Cutout	136
2012	Frankenweenie	USA	Puppet	87
2012	7 Sea Pirates	Argentina-Chile-Uruguay	Puppet	80
2013	Miffy the Movie	Netherlands	Puppet	70
2013	Lisa Limone and Maroc Orange: A Rapid Love Story	Estonia	Puppet	72
2013	Louis & Luca and the Snow Machine	Norway	Puppet	76
2013	Worms	Brazil/Canada	Puppet	82
2013	Spot and Spldogde Plottspotting	Sweden	Puppet	53
2014	The Boxtrolls	USA	Puppet	96
2014	Possessed	Spain	Clay	81
2015	Shaun the Sheep Movie	UK/France	Clay	85
2015	El Bandido Cucaracha	Spain	Puppet	74
2015	Little from the Fish Shop	Czech Republic/France/Slovakia	Puppet	72
2015	Acid Space	Italy	Puppet	70
2015	Hell and Back	USA	Puppet	84
2015	Louis and Luca – The Big Cheese Race	Norway	Puppet	78
2015	Anomalisa	USA	Puppet	90
2015	Kuru Kuru and Friends: The Rainbow Tree Forest	South Korea/Japan	Puppet	74
2015	The Hunting of the Snark	UK	Puppet	65
2016	Les espiègles	France	Puppet	44
2016	Pat a Mat ve filmu	Czech Republic	Puppet	56
2016	Finding Santa	Sweden/Denmark	Puppet	80
2016	Murderous Tales	Czech Republic/Slovakia	Puppet	80
2016	Kubo and the Two Strings	USA	Puppet	102
2016	My Life as a Courgette	France/Switzerland	Clay	66
2016	In the Forest of Huckybucky	Norway/Netherlands	Puppet	75
2017	Moomins and the Winter Wonderland	Finland/Poland	Puppet	82
2017	Junk Head	Japan	Puppet	101
2017	Laika	Czech Republic	Puppet	88
2018	The Tower	France/Sweden/Norway	Puppet	74
2018	Pat & Mat Back in Action	Czech Republic	Puppet	75
2018	Early Man	UK/France	Clay	89
2018	Chuck Steel: Night of the Trampires	UK	Puppet	85
2018	This Magnificent Cake!	Belgium/France/Netherlands	Puppet	44
2018	Isle of Dogs	USA/Germany	Puppet	101
2018	Pat & Mat: Winter Fun	Czech Republic	Puppet	60
2018	S He	China	Puppet	95
2018	Strike	UK	Puppet	100
2018	Captain Morten and the Spider Queen	Estonia/Ireland/UK/Belgium	Puppet	79
2018	Gofmaniada	Russia	Puppet	78
2018	The Wolf House	Chile	Puppet	75
2018	Louis & Luca - Mission to the Moon	Norway	Puppet	80
2018	Urpo ja Turpo johtolangan jäljillä	Finland	Puppet	60
2019	Missing Link	USA	Puppet	93
2019	Pat & Mat: DIY Troubles	Czech Republic	Puppet	57
2019	The Old Man	Estonia	Puppet	88
2019	A Shaun the Sheep Movie: Farmageddon	UK/France	Clay	87
2020	A Colourful Dream	Czech Republic	Puppet	74
2020	The Nose or the Conspiracy of Mavericks	Russia	Cutout	89
2020	L'équipe de secours, en route pour l'aventure!	France	Puppet	44
2020	Alien Xmas	USA	Puppet	40
2021	Mad God	USA	Puppet	83
2021	Bob Spit: We Do Not Like People	Brazil	Puppet	90
2021	Even Mice Belong in Heaven	Czech Republic/France/Slovakia/Poland	Puppet	80
2021	Adventures of a young Moomin	Poland	Puppet	74
2021	Pat & Mat: Baking and Grilling!	Czech Republic	Puppet	60
2022	The House	UK	Puppet	97
2022	Knor	Netherlands	Puppet	72
2022	Wendell & Wild	USA	Puppet	105
2022	Guillermo del Toro's Pinocchio	USA/Mexico	Puppet	117
2022	No Dogs or Italians Allowed	France/Italy/Switzerland	Puppet	70
2023	The Inventor	France/Ireland/USA	Puppet	92
2023	Chicken Run: Dawn of the Nugget	UK	Clay	98
2023	My Grandfather's Demons	Portugal	Puppet	85
2023	Tony, Shelly and the Magic Light	Hungary, Slovakia, Czech Republic	Puppet	80
2024	Memoir of a Snail	Australia	Clay	95
2024	Living Large	Czech Republic, France, Slovakia	Puppet	80
2024	Savages	Switzerland, France, Belgium	Puppet	87
2024	Wallace & Gromit: Vengeance Most Fowl	UK	Clay	79
2025	I Am Frankelda	Mexico	Puppet	113
2025	Junk World	Japan	Puppet	104
2025	Saurus City	USA	Puppet	83
2025	Olivia and the Invisible Earthquake	Spain, France, Belgium	Puppet	70
2025	Tales from the Magic Garden	Czech Republic, Slovakia, Slovenia, France	Puppet	71
2025	Memory Hotel	Germany	Puppet	110
2026	Wildwood	USA	Puppet	132
2026	Shaun the Sheep: The Beast of Mossy Bottom	UK	Clay	81

=== Upcoming ===
Year	Title	Country	Type
TBA	Hansel and Gretel	Chile	
TBA	Inzomnia	Mexico	Puppet
TBA	The Ballad of the Phoenix	Mexico	Puppet
TBA	The Night Gardener	USA	Puppet
TBA	The Ocean at the End of the Lane	USA	Puppet
TBA	Piranesi	USA	Puppet
TBA	The Buried Giant	USA	Puppet
TBA	Winter Wonderland	USA	Puppet
TBA	Untitled Tim Burton stop-motion film	USA	Puppet
TBA	Twilight Park	USA	Puppet

== Films with stop motion sequences ==
These films are primarily not stop motion, but incorporate elements of it, often for special effects.

Year	Title	Country	Lead animator	Sequence	Running time
1907	The 'Teddy' Bears	United States			
1907	The Haunted Hotel	USA			
1908	Hôtel électrique	France		Cutout, several sequences	8
1913	The Night Before Christmas	Russia	Ladislas Starevich		41
1914	Cabiria	Italy	Giovanni Pastrone		200
1914	The Snow Queen	Russia	Ladislas Starevich		26
1917	La guerra e il sogno di Momi	Italy	Segundo de Chomón		30
1918	Stella Maris	Russia	Ladislas Starevich		80
1922	Häxan	Denmark/Sweden		The devil	104
1922	Nosferatu	Germany		Closing coffin, opening hatch	
1923	Three Ages	USA		Brontosaurus	63
1925	The Lost World	USA	Willis O'Brien	Dinosaurs	106
1933	King Kong	USA	Willis O'Brien	King Kong, dinosaurs and other creatures	104
1933	Son of Kong	USA	Willis O'Brien	Little Kong, dinosaurs and other creatures	69
1934	Babes in Toyland	USA	Gus Meins, Charley Rogers	Toy soldiers	78
1935	The New Gulliver	USSR	Aleksandr Ptushko, Fyodor Krasniy	Lilliputians	75
1939	The Golden Key	USSR	Aleksandr Ptushko	Buratino, Alisa the Fox, Basilio the Cat, rat, magic tree, Tortila the Turtle, fish, frogs and some shots of puppets and Artemon the poodle	72
1949	Alice in Wonderland	France/UK	Lou Bunin	All the Wonderland characters	96
1949	Mighty Joe Young	USA	Willis O'Brien, Ray Harryhausen, Pete Peterson	Joe Young and other creatures	94
1950	The Great Rupert	USA		Squirrel	87
1951	The Lost Continent	USA	Edward Nassour	Dinosaurs	80
1953	The Beast from 20,000 Fathoms	USA	Ray Harryhausen	The Rhedosaurus	80
1953	Robot Monster	USA	Creators of The Lost Continent (above)	Triceratops and Brontosaurus	102
1954	Godzilla	Japan		A fire truck flipping over and a later shot of Godzilla's tail destroying the Nichigeki Theater building	96
1955	It Came from Beneath the Sea	USA	Ray Harryhausen	Giant octopus	79
1955	Journey to Prehistory	Czechoslovakia	Karel Zeman	Dinosaurs and other creatures	93
1956	The Beast of Hollow Mountain	USA	Willis O'Brien	Allosaurus	81
1956	Earth vs. the Flying Saucers	USA	Ray Harryhausen	UFOs	83
1957	20 Million Miles to Earth	USA	Ray Harryhausen	The Ymir and an Asian elephant	82
1957	The Black Scorpion	USA	Willis O'Brien, Pete Peterson	Scorpions, tentacled insect, cave spider, tanks, helicopters, and train derailing	88
1957	Kronos	USA	Gene Warren, Wah Chang	Kronos	78
1958	The 7th Voyage of Sinbad	USA	Ray Harryhausen	The dragon, Cyclops, adult and baby Roc, skeleton, snake woman	88
1958	Fiend Without a Face	UK	Florenz Von Nordoff, K. L. Lupel	Crawling alien brains	77
1958	Invention for Destruction	Czechoslovakia	Karel Zeman	Some marine animals	83
1958	Monster from Green Hell	USA		Snake, wasps	71
1958	Tom Thumb	USA		Toys	98
1959	Behemoth the Sea Monster	UK/USA	Pete Peterson, Willis O'Brien	The Paleosaurus	80
1959	The Devil's Disciple	UK/USA		Toy soldiers	83
1959	Gigantis, the Fire Monster	Japan/USA		Brontosaurs	
1959	Owls in the Marsh	Norway	Ivo Caprino	The owl, the little gnome and the crab	94
1960	Dinosaurus!	USA	Wah Chang	Dinosaurs	85
1960	Goliath and the Dragon (US Version)	France/Italy	Jim Danforth	Dragon	98
1960	The Three Worlds of Gulliver	UK/USA	Ray Harryhausen	Crocodile and squirrel	100
1960	The Time Machine	USA		Decaying Morlock	103
1961	Babes in Toyland	USA	Jack Donohue	Toy soldiers	105
1961	The Parent Trap	USA		opening and closing credits sequence	128
1961	Goliath Against the Giants	Italy		Dragon	98
1961	Mysterious Island	USA	Ray Harryhausen	Giant crabs, Phorusrhacos, giant bees and Ammonite	96
1961	Reptilicus	Denmark	Kaye Koed	The Reptilicus	92
1962	Jack the Giant Killer	USA	Jim Danforth	Cormoran, Thunderdell, sea monster and Pendragon as dragon	91
1962	Journey to the 7th Planet	Denmark/USA	Jim Danforth	Cyclops rat creature	83
1962	The Fabulous Baron Munchausen	Czechoslovakia	Karel Zeman		85
1962	King Kong vs. Godzilla	Japan	Kōichi Takano	Brief fight of King Kong and Godzilla	97
1962	The Wonderful World of the Brothers Grimm	USA	Jim Danforth	The cobblers, a flower and a dragon	135
1963	Atom Age Vampire	Italy		Professor Levin's transformation	105
1963	It's a Mad, Mad, Mad, Mad World	USA	Willis O'Brien	Fire escape, ladder, and dangling characters at the film's end	161
1963	Jason and the Argonauts	USA	Ray Harryhausen	Talos, Harpies, the Hydra, skeletons and other creatures	104
1964	7 Faces of Dr. Lao	USA	Jim Danforth	Sea serpent	100
1964	First Men in the Moon	USA	Ray Harryhausen	Selenites, Grand Lunar, the moon calves, Kate's skeleton and spaceships	103
1964	A Jester's Tale	Czechoslovakia	Karel Zeman		82
1966	The Daydreamer	USA/Canada/Japan	Tadahito Mochinaga		101
1966	One Million Years B.C.	USA	Ray Harryhausen	Dinosaurs and an elephant	100
1967	The Nutcracker	Poland	Halina Bielińska	The Nutcracker and the Mouse King	84
1967	The Stolen Airship	Czechoslovakia	Karel Zeman		90
1968	Kingdom in the Clouds	Romania		Queen of the Forest Birds	83
1968	The Power	USA	Pete Kleinow, David Pal	Toy soldiers, skeleton	108
1969	The Mighty Gorga	USA	Jim Danforth	Dragon (stock footage from Goliath and the Dragon)	84
1969	The Valley of Gwangi	USA	Ray Harryhausen	Dinosaurs, an Eohippus and an Asian elephant	96
1969	Mystery-Bouffe	USSR		Story scenes	48
1970	Equinox	USA	Jim Danforth, David Allen, Dennis Muren	Demons	80
1970	On the Comet	Czechoslovakia	Karel Zeman		74
1971	When Dinosaurs Ruled the Earth	USA	Jim Danforth, David Allen	Dinosaurs and crabs	100
1971	Willy Wonka & the Chocolate Factory	USA		Augustus Gloop going up the pipe	100
1973	Marco	USA/Japan	Akikazu Kono	Marco Polo's story of the Tree People	109
1974	Flesh Gordon	USA	Jim Danforth, David Allen, Dennis Muren	Creatures	78
1974	The Golden Voyage of Sinbad	USA	Ray Harryhausen	One-eyed centaur, Griffin, Kali, homunculus, figurehead	105
1974	The Legend Of Hillbilly John	USA		Giant bird	86
1977	The Crater Lake Monster	USA	David W. Allen	The plesiosaur	85
1977	Eraserhead	USA	David Lynch	Worm creature	89
1977	Sinbad and the Eye of the Tiger	USA	Ray Harryhausen	Kassim as a baboon, Troglodyte, Smilodon, Minoton, Ghouls, giant walrus and giant wasp	113
1977	Star Wars	USA	Phil Tippett	The pieces during the dejarik game on the Millennium Falcon and training remote	123
1978	The Alien Factor	USA	Ernest Farino	Alien	80
1978	Laserblast	USA	David Allen	Aliens	84
1978	Piranha	USA	Phil Tippett	Piranhas, creature in laboratory	94
1978	Planet of Dinosaurs	USA	Doug Beswick	Dinosaurs and a spider	84
1978	Starcrash	USA/Italy	Luigi Cozzi	Starships, robots	94
1979	Mr. Mike's Mondo Video	USA		Dinosaurs, cat skeleton	75
1980	The Day Time Ended	USA	David Allen	Aliens	120
1980	The Empire Strikes Back	USA	Phil Tippett	Viper probe droid, Tauntauns, AT-ATs, AT-STs, and Bogwings	129
1981	Caveman	USA	Jim Danforth, David Allen, Randall William Cook	Dinosaurs	92
1981	Clash of the Titans	USA	Ray Harryhausen, Jim Danforth, Steve Archer	Calibos, Bubo, Kraken, Pegasus, Medusa, giant vulture, Dioskilos and giant scorpions	118
1981	Dragonslayer	USA	Phil Tippett	Dragon	108
1981	The Evil Dead	USA	Tom Sullivan, Bart Pierce	Linda's leg infection, the supernatural opening of the Jukebox, the rotting corpses of the deadites of Cherly and Scotty, and the Necronomicon flailing its tongue in the fireplace	85
1981	Galaxy of Terror	USA	Brian Chin	Giant maggot, a grotesque insect-like creature	81
1981	The Howling	USA	David Allen	Brief sequence of the werewolves at the end of the film	91
1981	Saturday the 14th	USA	Brian Chin, Ron Lizorty	Bats	76
1982	Basket Case	USA		Various sequences of Belial	91
1982	E.T. the Extra-Terrestrial	USA	Dennis Muren	Flying bikes	114
1982	Mysterious Planet	USA	Brett Piper		71
1982	Q	USA	Randall William Cook, David Allen	The Winged Serpent	93
1982	The Thing	USA	Randall William Cook	A tentacle on the Blair-Thing	109
1982	L'ange	France	Patrick Bokanowski	Optical manipulation of sequences	64
1983	Hercules	Italy	Luigi Cozzi	Robots	100
1983	The Hunger	USA	David Allen	Monkey aging sequence	97
1983	Jaws 3-D	USA	Ted Rae (uncredited)	A wide shot of the mother great white shark's body sticking out of the control room's window	98
1983	Krull	UK		Giant spider	117
1983	Return of the Jedi	USA	Phil Tippett	AT-STs, Bogwings, and brief shot of AT-AT walking	134
1984	2010: The Year We Make Contact	USA	Randall William Cook		116
1984	The Adventures of Buckaroo Banzai Across the 8th Dimension	USA	Rick Heinrichs		103
1984	Caravan of Courage: An Ewok Adventure	USA	Phil Tippett	Creatures	96
1984	Dreamscape	USA	Jim Aupperle	Snake man	99
1984	Ghostbusters	USA	Randall William Cook	The Terror Dogs and the roof of the Ghostbusters' HQ getting busted through by the escaping ghosts	107
1984	Gremlins	USA	Gene Warren Jr., Peter Kleinow	Marching Gremlins	106
1984	Indiana Jones and the Temple of Doom	USA		Mine cart	118
1984	Lost on Adventure Island	USA	Keith Finkelstein	Dinosaurs, giant ape	69
1984	The NeverEnding Story	West Germany / USA		Some shots of the flying Falkor	94
1984	Space Raiders	USA	Brian Chin	Bug	84
1984	Star Trek III: The Search for Spock	USA			105
1984	The Terminator	USA	Doug Beswick, Pete Kleinow, Stan Winston	Battle-damaged Terminator, Hunter Killers (tank and aerial)	108
1985	The Adventures of Hercules	Italy / USA	Jean Manuel Costa	Medusa	88
1985	Better Off Dead	USA	Jimmy Picker	Singing hamburgers	97
1985	The Dungeonmaster	USA	David Allen	Giant statue	73
1985	Ewoks: The Battle for Endor	USA		Creatures	94
1985	House	USA	Mark Sullivan	Flying skeleton	93
1985	Night Train to Terror	USA	Anthony Doublin; William R. Stromberg	Demons	98
1985	The Oracle	USA	Dean Mercil	Demons	94
1985	Pee-wee's Big Adventure	USA	Stephen Chiodo, Rick Heinrichs	Dinosaur, Large Marge	90
1985	Return to Oz	USA	Will Vinton	Nome King and other nomes	113
1985	The Strangeness	USA	Jean Manuel Costa	Monster	93
1985	The Stuff	USA		A brief sequence of the Stuff near the end.	87
1985	Young Sherlock Holmes	USA	David Allen	Creatures of hallucination	109
1986	Aliens	USA	Doug Beswick	Some shots of the Xenomorph Queen	137
1986	Spookies	USA		Adrienne getting her face melted by a Tentacle Monster	85
1986	From Beyond	USA		Some shots of the Pretorius creature	86
1986	Galaxy	USA		Spaceships, creatures	100
1986	The Golden Child	USA	Phil Tippett	The devil and the dancing Pepsi can	94
1986	Howard the Duck	USA	Phil Tippett	Dark Overlord of the Universe	111
1986	Mutilations	USA		Mutilated cow, spaceship, aliens	70
1986	Troll	USA	Jim Aupperle, Gail van der Merwe		82
1987	Batteries Not Included	USA	David Allen	The spaceships	107
1987	Dolls	USA	David Allen	The Dolls	77
1987	Evil Dead II	USA	Doug Beswick	Decapitated Linda, Henrietta monster, and Ash's severed hand	85
1987	Ganjasaurus Rex	USA		Dinosaur	88
1987	The Gate	USA	Randall William Cook	Demons	85
1987	Ghoulies II	USA	David Allen	Creatures	89
1987	House II: The Second Story	USA	Phil Tippett	Dinosaurs and the undead horse of Slim Reeser	88
1987	It's Alive III: Island of the Alive	USA	William Hedge	Baby	95
1987	Leonard Part 6	USA		Bill Cosby riding an ostrich	85
1987	A Nightmare on Elm Street 3: Dream Warriors	USA	Doug Beswick	Freddy coming to life as a puppet and his skeleton from the grave	96
1987	RoboCop	USA	Phil Tippett	ED-209 and Robocop, Dinosaur	103
1987	R.O.T.O.R.	USA		Robot chassis	90
1988	Alice	Czechoslovakia	Jan Švankmajer	All the Wonderland characters	86
1988	The Bear	France	Jean-Jacques Annaud	Dream in the young Cub	94
1988	Beetlejuice	USA	Doug Beswick, Tim Lawrence, Ted Rae	Beetlejuice snake, sandworm, transformations, fireplace stretching, living sculptures	92
1988	Bino Fabule	Belgium/Canada/France		Puppet	85
1988	Brain Damage	USA		Aylmer the malevolent leech-like brain-eating parasite	84
1988	Fright Night Part 2	USA		Vampire bat	104
1988	Hellbound: Hellraiser II	UK/USA	Rory Fellowes, Karl Watkins	Channard Cenobite's weapon tentacles	93
1988	Moonwalker	USA	Will Vinton	Spike the Rabbit and other characters from Speed Demon segment	86
1988	Mutant War	USA	Brett Piper	Creatures	82
1988	Peacock King	Hongkong / Japan		Creature	96
1988	The Phantom Empire	USA	Doug Beswick	Dinosaurs (stock footage from Planet of Dinosaurs)	85
1988	Pulse Pounders	USA	Justin Kohn	Demon, doll	77
1988	The Spider Labyrinth	Italy		Spiders, Spider god	86
1988	Who Framed Roger Rabbit	USA	Tom St. Amand	Flattened Judge Doom	20
1988	Willow	USA	David W. Allen	Dragon & living stove	126
1989	After Midnight	USA		Skeleton	90
1989	Ghostbusters II	USA	Phil Tippett	The Washington Square Ghost and Movie Theatre Ghost	108
1989	Honey, I Shrunk the Kids	USA	David W. Allen, Phil Tippett	Antie the Ant, bees, butterfly, scorpion, and climbing plant	90
1989	The Abyss	USA		Some shots of the submersibles' robot arms	88
1989	I, Madman	USA	Randall William Cook	Canine human	89
1989	Isle of Flowers	Brazil		Description about the humans, the highly developed telencephalon, money, barter and profit	13
1989	Marquis	Belgium/France	Henri Xhonneux, Roland Topor	scene of move	88
1989	Puppet Master	USA	David Allen	The living puppets	90
1989	Sundown: The Vampire in Retreat	USA	Hal Miles	Vampire bat	104
1989	Tetsuo: The Iron Man	Japan	Shinya Tsukamoto	Main character, woman, metal fetishist	67
1990	Bride of Re-Animator	USA		Eye-Finger-Creature	96
1990	Captain America	USA/Yugoslavia		Mutated rat by Fascists	97
1990	Crash and Burn	USA		Robot	85
1990	Empire of the Dark	USA		Demon	75
1990	Flesh Gordon Meets the Cosmic Cheerleaders	Canada	Lauritz Larson	Creatures	102
1990	Gremlins 2: The New Batch	USA		The bat gremlin and the spider gremlin	106
1990	The Gold Sword	USSR	Stanislav Sokolov		85
1990	Metamorphosis: The Alien Factor	USA	Kent Burton	Creatures	98
1990	Nightbreed	USA		A few of the creatures	102
1990	A Nymphoid Barbarian in Dinosaur Hell	USA	Brett Piper	Dinosaurs	90
1990	Olle Hexe	Germany		Alarm clock	76
1990	Puppet Master II	USA		Puppets	88
1990	RoboCop 2	USA	Phil Tippett	RoboCain and failed robots	117
1990	Robot Jox	USA	David Allen	Robots	85
1990	Simon and the Dreamhunters	Canada		Dinosaurus	83
1990	Tales from the Darkside: The Movie	USA	Justin Kohn	Flying gargoyle	93
1990	Teenage Mutant Ninja Turtles	USA		Flashback of Splinter before his mutation and flashback of childhood of the turtles	93
1991	Class of Nuke 'Em High 2: Subhumanoid Meltdown	USA		Creatures	100
1991	The Flying Sneaker AKA The Butterflies Time	Canada/Czechoslovakia			84
1991	Highway to Hell	USA		Three-headed dog, falling demon	94
1991	Lunatics: A Love Story	USA	Dave Hettmer	Spiders	87
1991	Puppet Master III: Toulon's Revenge	USA		Puppets	86
1991	Subspecies	USA	David Allen	Titular creatures	83
1991	Winterbeast	USA		Creatures	80
1991	Wizards of the Demon Sword	USA	Doug Beswick	Dinosaurs (stock footage from Planet of Dinosaurs)	90
1991	Zeiram	Japan			97
1992	Army of Darkness	USA	Sam Raimi	Demon, skeleton army and Evil Ash in skeleton form	88
1992	Braindead	New Zealand	Peter Jackson	The rat monkey	104
1992	Brain Donors	USA	Will Vinton	Intro and outro sequences	75
1992	Demonic Toys	USA	David W. Allen	Toy soldier	86
1992	Doctor Mordrid	USA	David W. Allen	T-rex skeleton, mammoth skeleton, demons	74
1992	Galaxy of the Dinosaurs	USA	Doug Beswick	Dinosaurs (stock footage from Planet of Dinosaurs)	62
1992	The Gate II: Trespassers	Canada	Steven Archer	Demons	93
1992	Invader	USA	Kent Burton	Giant robot	95
1992	Nemesis	USA	Peter Kleinow	Cyborg Farnsworth's mechanical endoskeleton	95
1993	Bloodstone: Subspecies II	USA		Demons	87
1993	Opera imaginaire	France		Segment Noi siamo zingarelle	51
1993	Body Bags	USA		Alien worms	91
1993	Coneheads	USA	Phil Tippett	Garthok	87
1993	Dinosaur from the Deep	France		Dinosaur	78
1993	Freaked	USA	David Daniels	Animated Title sequence	81
1993	Kamen Rider ZO	Japan		Spider woman	48
1993	Prehysteria!	USA	Charles Band	Mini-dinosaurs	84
1993	Puppet Master 4	USA		Puppets	79
1993	RoboCop 3	USA	Phil Tippett	ED-209 and some sequences of Robocop flying	104
1993	Robot Wars	USA	David Allen, Jim Danforth	Giant robots	71
1993	Ticks	USA	Yancy Calzada	Ticks	85
1994	Bloodlust: Subspecies III	USA		Demons	82
1994	Cabin Boy	USA	Doug Beswick	Ice creature	80
1994	Creatures from the Abyss	Italy	Jeff Sherman	Bobby creature	86
1994	Dinosaur Island	USA		Dinosaurs	83
1994	Dragonworld	USA	Jim Danforth, Paul Jessel, Joel Fletcher	Dragon	99
1994	Ed Wood	USA	Mark Villalobos		127
1994	Faust	Czech Republic/France/UK	Jan Švankmajer		97
1994	The Little Rascals	USA		Various sequences of children running rapidly	82
1994	Naked Gun 33 1/3: The Final Insult	USA		T-Rex	83
1994	Oblivion	USA	Joel Fletcher	Giant scorpions	94
1994	Regenerated Man	USA			89
1994	Puppet Master 5	USA		Puppets	81
1994	The Santa Clause	USA		Reindeer taking off and Scott Calvin going down the chimney	97
1995	Beach Babes 2: Cave Girl Island	USA	Doug Beswick	Dinosaurs (stock footage from Planet of Dinosaurs)	80
1995	Institute Benjamenta, or This Dream People Call Human Life	Germany/Japan/UK	Brothers Quay		104
1995	Josh Kirby... Time Warrior: Chapter 1, Planet of the Dino-Knights	USA	Chris Endicott, Rob Maine	Dinosaurs	88
1995	Magic Island	USA	Joel Fletcher	Giant statue	88
1995	The Mangler	USA/Australia/South Africa		Some shots of the Mangler	106
1995	Mechanical Violator Hakaider	Japan		Deformed cyborg Michael	51
1995	Mosquito	USA		Mosquitoes	93
1995	Screamers	USA	Kent Burton		108
1995	Tales from the Hood	USA	Kent Burton	Dolls	98
1995	Twilight of the Dogs	USA	Kent Burton	Giant spiders	114
1996	The Adventures of Pinocchio	UK/Czech Republic/France/Germany/USA	Phil Dale	Pinocchio	96
1996	Conspirators of Pleasure	Czech Republic/Switzerland/UK	Jan Švankmajer		85
1996	Dinosaur Valley Girls	USA		Dinosaurs	94
1996	Frostbiter: Wrath of the Wendigo	USA	Dave Hettmer	Wendigo	98
1996	Pterodactyl Woman from Beverly Hills	USA	Doug Beswick	Dinosaurs (stock footage from Planet of Dinosaurs)	97
1997	Anak ng bulkan	Philippines		Dinosaur	82
1997	Good Burger	USA		Cheeseburger assembly	97
1997	A Life Less Ordinary	UK/USA		Alternate ending over end credits	103
1997	Time Tracers	USA	Doug Beswick	Dinosaurs (stock footage from Planet of Dinosaurs)	101
1999	Muppets from Space	USA		Kap'n Alphabet Cereal assembly	87
2000	Drainiac!	USA	Brett Piper		81
2000	Little Otik	Czech Republic/Japan/UK	Jan Švankmajer	Otik	132
2001	Monkeybone	USA	Paul Berry	Monkeybone	93
2001	Scary Movie 2	USA		Black Cat and Marijuana weed monster	82
2002	Psyclops	USA	Brett Piper		93
2002	Frida	USA	Brothers Quay	Frida Kahlo's Day of the Dead-inspired hallucination	123
2003	Arachnia	USA	Brett Piper	Spiders	82
2003	Elf	USA	The Chiodo Brothers	Leon the snowman introduction	97
2004	The Life Aquatic with Steve Zissou	USA	Henry Selick	The jaguar shark, recon sea turtles, crayon ponyfish, fighting crabs, and various fish	119
2004	Monster Island	USA	David Bowes	Giant insects and other creatures	119
2004	Tajemnica kwiatu paproci	Poland	Tadeusz Wilkosz	Dolls from kindergarten and theresidents of Wysypisko-Śmieciowisko	66
2004	Teenage Cavegirl	USA	Doug Beswick	Dinosaurs (stock footage from Planet of Dinosaurs)	80
2005	The Great Yokai War	Japan			124
2005	The League of Gentlemen's Apocalypse	UK	Ken Lidster	Homunculus	92
2005	Lunacy	Czech Republic/Slovakia	Jan Švankmajer		118
2005	The Piano Tuner of Earthquakes	France/Germany/UK	Brothers Quay		99
2005	Santa's Slay	USA		story of Grandpa Juleson about Santa and Angel	78
2006	The Fall	USA/India	Tarsem Singh	Alexandria's head injury	117
2006	The Science of Sleep	France	Michel Gondry		106
2008	Hellboy II: The Golden Army	USA		Animated bedtime story	120
2008	Imagination	USA	Eric Leiser		70
2010	Ironhorse	USA	Chris J. Miller		83
2010	Surviving Life	Czech Republic	Jan Švankmajer		109
2010	Kooky	Czech Republic	Jan Svěrák		95
2011	The Flying Machine	Poland/UK	Janusz Martyn		85
2011	A Very Harold and Kumar Christmas	USA	Todd Strauss-Schulson	Stoned dream sequence	90
2011	Crucil	Romania		Cutout sequences	73
2011	Manborg	Canada			70
2012	A Liar's Autobiography: The Untrue Story of Monty Python's Graham Chapman	UK		Various sequences	85
2013	Go Goa Gone	India		In the song "Khoon Choos Le", several shots	
2014	The Late Night Double Feature	USA	Norman Yeend	Monsters from another dimension	90
2014	Sinbad: The Fifth Voyage	USA			89
2015	Reveries of a Solitary Walker	Italy	Paolo Gaudio	Book's narrated scenes in claymation	86
2015	The Little Prince	France		Book's story sequences	108
2015	Star Wars: The Force Awakens	USA	Phil Tippett	The pieces during the dejarik game on the Millennium Falcon	135
2015	Me and Earl and the Dying Girl	USA	Alfonso Gomez-Rejon	Effects in multiple amateur stop-motion movies	105
2016	Miss Peregrine's Home for Peculiar Children	USA	Matthew Day	Toy creatures	127
2018	Sorry to Bother You	USA	David Lauer, Ri Crawford	The presentation credited to "Michel Dongry" shown to Cassius by Steve Lift	112
2018	Insects (film)	Czech Republic	Jan Švankmajer		98
2018	Solo: A Star Wars Story	USA	David Lauer	The pieces during the dejarik game on the Millennium Falcon	135
2019	Booksmart	USA	Javan Ivey	Amy and Molly's drug hallucination	105
2019	Spider-Man: Far From Home	USA		Stop-motion end credits sequence designed by Perception	129
2020	Toys of Terror	USA		The scary toys	89
2021	Marcel the Shell with Shoes On	USA			90
2022	When the Robbers Came to Cardamom Town	Norway	Rasmus A. Sivertsen	Sets have gone through photogrammetry to create CGI models	78
2023	Asteroid City	USA	Kim Keukeleire	Alien	105
2023	Blue Beetle	USA		stop-motion El Chapulin Colorado sequences	127
2023	Stopmotion	UK			93
2023	The Primevals	USA			90
2024	Johnny & Me	Austria/Switzerland/Germany			104
2024	Beetlejuice Beetlejuice	USA		Sandworm and flashback of Charles Deetz' death	104
2026	I Love Boosters	USA			113
2026	The Mandalorian and Grogu	USA		Arges and Bullethead	132

== Stop motion shorts ==
Year	Title	Country	Type
1912	Piękna Lukanida	Russia	Puppet
1912	The Cameraman's Revenge	Russia	Puppet
1913	The Ant and the Grasshopper	Russia	Puppet
1915	The Dinosaur and The Missing Link	USA	Puppet
1915	Morpheus Mike	USA	Puppet
1917	Prehistoric Poultry	USA	Puppet
1917	R.F.D., 10,000 B.C.	USA	Puppet
1922	Les Grenouilles qui demandent un roi	France	Puppet
1925	Les yeux du dragon	France	Puppet
1926	The Thief of Baguda Castle	Japan	Cutout
1928	The Magical Clock	France	Puppet
1929	The little parade	France	Puppet
1932–48	Puppetoons	USA/Netherlands	Puppet
1933–38	Fétiche	France	Puppet
1949	Román S Basou^{(The Novel With The Double-Bass)}	Czechoslovakia	Puppet
1949	Certuv mlýn^{(The Devil's Mill)}	Czechoslovakia	Puppet
1949	Arie prerie^{(Song of the Prairie)}	Czechoslovakia	Puppet
1952	Neighbours	Canada	Pixilation
1952	Two Bagatelles	Canada	Pixilation
1955	Magic Brush	China	Puppet
1959	Noah's Ark	USA	Puppet
1962	A Symposium on Popular Songs	USA	Puppet/Cutout
1965	The Hand	Czechoslovakia	Puppet
1968	The Little Drummer Boy	USA/Japan	Puppet
1969	Gena the Crocodile	USSR	Puppet
1971	The Battle of Kerzhenets	USSR	Cutout
1971	Cheburashka	USSR	Puppet
1972	Balablok	Canada	Cutout
1974	Closed Mondays	USA	Clay/puppet
1974	Shapoklyak	USSR	Puppet
1975	The First Christmas: The Story of the First Christmas Snow	USA/Japan	Puppet
1975	Hedgehog in the Fog	USSR	Cutout
1975	Wolf and Seven Kids in a New Way	USSR	Clay
1976	Beauty and the Beast	East Germany	Puppet
1976	The Little Drummer Boy, Book II	USA/Japan	Puppet
1977	Nestor, the Long-Eared Christmas Donkey	USA/Japan	Puppet
1977	Rime of the Ancient Mariner	USA	Cutout
1977	The Sand Castle	Canada	Clay/sand
1978	Rip Van Winkle	USA	Clay
1979	Tale of Tales	USSR	Cutout
1981	Alice in Wonderland	USSR	Cutout
1981	The Leprechauns' Christmas Gold	USA/Japan	Puppet
1981	'E'	Canada	Cutout
1981	Plasticine Crow	USSR	Clay
1982	Vincent	USA	Puppet
1983	Cheburashka Goes to School	USSR	Puppet
1984	Prehistoric Beast	USA	Puppet
1986	Nightangel	Canada/Czechoslovakia	Pinscreen/puppet
1986	Street of Crocodiles	UK	Puppet
1987	A Claymation Christmas Celebration	USA	Puppet
1988	The Beauty and The Beast	Denmark	Puppet
1989	Creature Comforts	UK	Clay/puppet
1989	Wallace & Gromit: A Grand Day Out	UK	Clay/puppet
1990	Grey Wolf and Little Red Riding Hood	USSR	Clay
1991	Adam	UK	Clay/puppet
1991	The Sandman	UK	Puppet
1992	The Spirit of Christmas: Jesus vs. Frosty	USA	Cutout
1993	Wallace & Gromit: The Wrong Trousers	UK	Clay/puppet
1993	The Junky's Christmas	USA	Puppet
1995	Wallace & Gromit: A Close Shave	UK	Clay/puppet
1995	The Spirit of Christmas: Jesus vs. Santa	USA	Cutout
1996	Uncle	Australia	Clay/puppet
1997	Cousin	Australia	Clay/puppet
1998	More	USA	Puppet
1998	Domo-kun (series)	Japan	Puppet
1999	Brother	Australia	Clay/puppet
1999	A Suspeita	Portugal	Clay
2001	Hasta los huesos	Mexico	Puppet
2003	Doggy Poo	South Korea	Puppet
2003	Harvie Krumpet	Australia	Clay/puppet
2004	Magda	USA	Puppet/cutout
2005	The Captain's Daughter	Russia	Puppet
2006	Peter & the Wolf	UK/Norway/Poland	Puppet
2007	Madame Tutli-Putli	Canada	Puppet
2007	The light before Christmas	USA	Puppet
2008	El retrato de la peste	Argentina	Puppet
2008	The Necktie	Canada	Puppet
2008	Wallace & Gromit: A Matter of Loaf and Death	UK	Clay/puppet
2009	Jericho: The Promise Fulfilled	USA	Puppet
2010-2014	Marcel the Shell with Shoes On	USA	Clay/puppet
2012	Head over Heels	UK	Puppet
2012	It's a SpongeBob Christmas	USA	Puppet
2013	Lettres de femmes	France	Puppet
2015	Shaun the Sheep: The Farmer's Llamas	UK	Puppet
2015	Adventures of Malia	India	Cutout
2015	Under The Apple Tree	Netherlands/Belgium	Puppet
2017	The Legend of Boo-Kini Bottom	USA	Puppet
2019	Washed	USA	Stop-motion/Pixilation/CGI
2019	The Doll's Breath	UK	Stop-motion
2021	Save Ralph	USA/Australia/UK	Puppet
2021	The Displeasure	Canada	Puppet
2022	Fed	USA	Stop-motion/Pixilation/CGI
2022	Mickey Saves Christmas	USA	Puppet
2023	Mickey and Friends Trick or Treats	USA	Puppet
2024	Bottle George	Japan	Puppet
2024	Self	USA	Computer/puppet
2024	Inkwo for When the Starving Return	Canada	Puppet
2024	Beautiful Men	Belgium	Puppet
2024	Over the Garden Wall: 10th Anniversary Tribute	USA	Puppet
2024	Sandy's Country Christmas	USA	Puppet
2025	The Girl Who Cried Pearls	Canada	Puppet

== Stop motion TV series and stop motion TV miniseries ==
Year	Title	Country	Type	Notes
1950–70	Andy Pandy (Original)	UK	Puppet (Note: The series was first produced using marionette puppetry, the 2002 reboot was produced in stop-motion.)	
1957–69	Gumby	USA	Clay	
1959–present	Sandmännchen	East Germany/Germany	Puppet	
1960	The Seal of Neptune	UK	Puppet	
1961–65	Pingwings	UK	Puppet	
1961	The New Adventures of Pinocchio	USA	Puppet	
1961–2004	Davey and Goliath	USA	Clay	
1964–77	The Magic Roundabout	France/UK	Puppet	
1965–67	The Pogles/Pogles' Wood	UK	Puppet	
1965–73	Hey Mister, Let's Play!	Czechoslovakia	Puppet	
1966	Camberwick Green	UK	Puppet	
1967	Trumpton	UK	Puppet	
1967–68	Las Aventuras de Mumú	Spain	Puppet	
1968–74	Barnaby	Poland/France	Puppet	
1968	The Herbs	UK	Puppet	
1968–92	Fabeltjeskrant	Netherlands	Puppet	
1969–73	Hattytown Tales	UK	Puppet	
1969	Chigley	UK	Puppet	
1969–72	The Clangers (original)	UK	Puppet	
1970–71	The Adventures of Parsley	UK	Puppet	
1971	Une Historie de Madame La Pie	France	Cutout	
1971–73	The Adventures of Dunno and His Friends	USSR	Puppet	
1972	Sam on Boffs' Island	UK	Puppet	
1972–2021	Loeki de Leeuw	Netherlands	Puppet	
1973–75	The Wombles	UK	Puppet	
1974	Chapi Chapo	France	Puppet	
1974	The Wizard of Oz	USSR	Puppet	
1974	Bagpuss	UK	Puppet	
1974–2007	Mio Mao	Italy/UK	Puppet	
1975–87	Miś Uszatek	Poland	Puppet	
1975–87	Leopold the cat	USSR	Cutout	First two episodes of the series were made in cut-out
1976	The Red and the Blue	Italy	Clay	
1976	A.E.I.O.U.	Italy	Sand	
1976–79	Adventures of Captain Vrungel	USSR	Cutout	
1976	Rubovia	UK	Puppet	
1976–80	Paddington	UK	Puppet/Cutout	
1976–present	Pat & Mat	Czechoslovakia	Puppet	
1976–79	Chorlton and the Wheelies	UK	Puppet	
1976-91	38 Parrots	USSR	Puppet	
1977–79	The Gublins	UK	Puppet	
1977–82	The Moomins	Poland/Austria	Puppet	
1977	The Flumps	UK	Puppet	
1977	Dunno in the Sunny City	USSR	Puppet	
1978–79	Quaq Quao	Italy	Origami	
1980	Mekk Elek, az ezermester	Hungary	Puppet	
1980–81	The Amazing Adventures of Morph	UK	Clay	
1980–86	Cockleshell Bay	UK	Puppet	
1981–2013	Postman Pat	UK	Puppet	
1982	Misi mókus kalandjai	Hungary	Puppet	
1983–86	Rocky Hollow	UK	Puppet	
1983	Gran	UK	Puppet	
1983	Moschops	UK	Puppet	
1983–86	The Adventures of Portland Bill	UK	Puppet	
1984–2008	Thomas & Friends	UK	Puppet/Model	Certain characters.
1984–86	Tottie: The Story of a Doll's House	UK	Puppet	
1984–90	The Wind in the Willows/Oh Mr. Toad	UK	Puppet	
1984-85	Dr. Aibolit	USSR	Cutout	
1985	Bertha	UK	Puppet	
1986–90	The Trap Door	UK	Clay	
1986–87	Dick Spanner, P.I.	UK	Puppet/Model	
1987–88	Foxy Fables	Israel	Clay	
1987–88	Plonsters	Germany/UK	Clay	
1987–89	Creepy Crawlies	UK	Puppet	
1987	Edward and Friends	UK	Clay	
1987–2005	Fireman Sam (series 1–5)	UK	Puppet	
1988	Stories of the Sylvanian Families	UK	Puppet	
1988–89	Charlie Chalk	UK	Puppet	
1989	Windfalls	UK	Puppet	
1989–90	Huxley Pig	UK	Puppet	
1990–2006	Pingu	Switzerland/UK	Puppet	
1990	Cecille	US	Clay	As part of Sesame Street.
1990	Bertie the Bat	Channel Islands	Cutout	
1991–2000	Soupe Opera	France	Food	
1991	Cogs Hollow	UK	Puppet	
1992	Joshua Jones	UK (Wales)	Puppet	
1992	Hairy Jeremy	France	Puppet	
1992	Truckers	UK	Puppet	
1992	The Gingerbread Man	UK	Puppet	
1992–96	Astro Farm	UK	Clay	
1992–2000	Noddy's Toyland Adventures	UK	Puppet	
1993–97	Old Bear Stories	UK	Puppet	
1993–98	Gogs	UK	Clay	
1994	Dig & Dug with Daisy	UK	Puppet	
1994–1995	Bump in the Night	USA	Clay	
1994–96	Fourways Farm	UK	Puppet	
1995–96	Molly's Gang	UK	Puppet	
1995–97	Crapston Villas	UK	Clay	
1995–97	Oakie Doke	UK	Puppet	
1995	Lizzie's Library	Australia	Puppet	
1995–96	Oscar and Friends	New Zealand	Clay	
1996–97	The Treacle People	UK	Puppet	
1996–2000	KaBlam!	USA	Puppet	
1996-98	Koki	Spain	Puppet	
1996–2000	The Enchanted World of Brambly Hedge	UK	Puppet	
1996-2000	Life with Loopy	US	Mixed	As part of KaBlam!.
1997	Plasmo	Australia	Clay	
1997–2000	The Animal Shelf	UK	Puppet	
1997–2001	Titch	UK	Puppet	
1997	Kitu and Woofl	Australia	Puppet	
1998–2002	Action League Now!	USA	Puppet	
1998–2002	Starhill Ponies	UK	Puppet	
1998	PB Bear and Friends	UK	Puppet	
1998–99	Rocky and the Dodos	UK	Puppet	
1998–2007	Celebrity Deathmatch	USA/Canada	Clay	
1998–2001	Rex the Runt	UK	Clay	
1998–2001	Rotten Ralph	UK/Canada	Puppet	
1999–2003	Hilltop Hospital	UK/France/Germany	Clay	
1999–2007	Little People	Denmark/USA/Canada	Clay	
1999–2019	Angry Kid	UK	Clay/Pixilation	
1999–2004	Bob the Builder	UK	Puppet	
1999–2000	Crashbox	USA	Puppet	
1999–2001	The PJs	USA	Clay	
1999–2000	Lavender Castle	UK	Puppet	
2000–01	Yoho Ahoy	UK	Puppet	
2000–01	Fetch the Vet	UK	Puppet	
2001–02	Dr Otter	UK	Puppet	
2001–02	Merlin the Magical Puppy	UK	Clay	
2001–03	El Nombre	UK	Puppet	
2001–02	Bill and Ben	UK	Puppet	
2001	Gary & Mike	USA	Clay	
2001	The Upstairs Downstairs Bears	Canada	Puppet	
2002	Andy Pandy (revival)	UK	Puppet	
2002	Soup	New Zealand	Clay	
2002–11	A Town Called Panic	Belgium	Puppet	
2002–05	Henry's World	Canada	Puppet	
2002–04	Engie Benjy	UK	Puppet	
2002	Wallace & Gromit's Cracking Contraptions	UK	Clay	
2002–03	I Spy	USA	Clay	
2003–05	Rubbadubbers	UK	Puppet	
2003–05	Little Robots	UK	Puppet	
2003–07	Miffy and Friends	Netherlands/UK	Puppet	
2003–07	The Koala Brothers	Australia/UK	Puppet	
2003–07	JoJo's Circus	USA/Canada	Clay	
2003–08	Poko	Canada	Puppet	
2003–04	The Wrong Coast	USA/Canada	Puppet	
2004–07	Little Red Tractor	UK	Puppet	
2004–07	Dragon	USA/Canada	Clay	
2005–11	Wapos Bay	UK	Puppet	
2005–22	Robot Chicken	USA	Mixed	
2005–10	Fifi and the Flowertots	UK	Clay	
2005–08	Bob the Builder: Project: Build It (series 10–16)	UK	Puppet	
2005	Summerton Mill	UK	Puppet	
2005–08 (2012)	Moral Orel	USA	Puppet	
2006–07	Purple and Brown	UK	Clay	
2006–12	Lunar Jim	Canada	Puppet	
2006–08	Feeling Good with JoJo	USA/Canada	Clay	
2006–13	Igam Ogam	UK	Puppet	
2006	What It's Like Being Alone	Canada	Clay	
2006–16	Curucuru and Friends	South Korea/China	Puppet	
2006–13	Bert and Ernie's Great Adventures	USA/Italy	Clay	
2007	Starveillance	USA/Canada	Clay	
2007	Stuff Vs. Stuff	UK	Household items	
2007–present	Shaun the Sheep	UK/Germany	Clay	
2007–10	Roary the Racing Car	UK	Puppet	
2007–09	Rick & Steve: The Happiest Gay Couple in All the World	USA/Canada	Lego	
2008	Akiba-chan	Japan	Figurine	
2008–17	Postman Pat: Special Delivery Service	UK	Puppet	
2008–09	Domo TV	USA/Japan	Puppet	
2009	Titan Maximum	USA	Puppet	
2009–12	Timmy Time	UK	Clay	
2009–10	OOglies	UK	Household items	
2009–11	Glenn Martin, DDS	USA/Canada	Puppet	
2010–12	Mary Shelley's Frankenhole	USA	Puppet	
2010	Wallace and Gromit's World of Invention	UK	Clay	
2011–15	Rastamouse	UK/Canada	Puppet	
2011–18	Raa Raa the Noisy Lion	UK	Puppet	
2012	Shaun the Sheep Championsheeps	UK	Clay	
2012	The Bite-Sized Adventures of Sam Sandwich	USA	Puppet	
2012–13	Toby's Travelling Circus	UK	Puppet	
2013–present	Mofy	Japan/Italy	Puppet	
2013–17	Clay Kids	Spain/UK/USA	Clay	
2014–18	Guardians Evolution	Canada	Clay	
2014–19	Tumble Leaf	USA	Puppet	
2015–present	Clangers (revival)	UK	Puppet	
2015–18	Paper Port	Chile/Argentina/Brazil/Colombia	Puppet	
2015–19	SuperMansion	USA	Puppet	
2015–17	Twirlywoos	UK	Puppet	
2015–present	Scream Street	UK	Puppet	
2016	Greatest Party Story Ever	USA	Puppet	
2016–present	George & Paul	Netherlands/Belgium	Puppet	
2017	Buddy Thunderstruck	USA	Puppet	
2018–22	Bo & To's Family	South Korea	Puppet	
2018–20	The Shivering Truth	USA	Puppet	
2018–present	The Diary of Bita and Cora	Spain	Clay	
2019	Rilakkuma and Kaoru	Japan/USA	Puppet	
2019–21	Teenie Scouts Big Five	South Korea	Puppet	
2019–present	Kiri and Lou	New Zealand	Clay	
2019–20	Moon and Me	UK	Puppet	
2019–21	Norman Picklestripes	USA/Canada/UK	Clay	
2020	Shaun the Sheep: Adventures from Mossy Bottom (series 6)	UK	Puppet	
2020–21	Crossing Swords	USA	Puppet	
2021	John Dillermand	Denmark	Puppet	
2021	Ultra City Smiths	USA	Puppet	
2021	Pui Pui Molcar	Japan	Puppet	
2021	Marvel's M.O.D.O.K.	USA	Puppet	
2021	Frankelda's Book of Spooks	Mexico	Puppet	
2021	Santa Inc.	USA	Puppet	
2021	The Very Small Creatures	UK	Clay	
2022	Alabama Jackson	USA	Puppet	
2022	The Tiny Chef Show	USA	Puppet	
2023–present	Shape Island	USA	Puppet	
2023	Duffy and Friends	USA	Puppet	

== See also ==
- Stop motion
- Claymation
  - List of films featuring claymation
- cutout animation
- List of puppet films
- Puppetoon
- History of animation
- Highest-grossing stop motion animation films
