= Puppet film =

Live-action or animated film featuring puppets

- Years active: Early 1900s-present
- Influences: Animation, live-action film, horror film, comedy, fantasy film
- Influenced: Puppetry

A puppet film is a type of film focused on puppetry used to depict main characters. First appearing in the early 1900s as with other film genres, puppet films became more common starting around the 1930s, where virtually all puppet films were within the comedy genre. Notable early exceptions to this standard included the Thunderbirds series and The Dark Crystal, and horror-based puppet films such as the Puppet Master and Child's Play series became common starting in the 1980s. Compared to other films, puppet films typically place more focus on characters' movements and other forms of visual appeal, and typically cater to children and other young audiences, though this standard has been increasingly challenged in recent years as an evolution of the aforementioned horror variations.

== History ==
The first puppet film " Dolly's Toys " is shown in 1902. It is also the first puppet animation in history. It is inspired by puppetry and uses puppets as main characters in the films.

In Europe, Great Britain creates the earliest series of puppet films in 1900s. After 1920s, many great puppet films appears among different European countries, such as Germany's "Eva and Grasshopper"(1928), Poland's "For Pete's Sake"(1966) and France's "Frags Who Wanted a King"(1923). The main genre is comedy.

In the USA, puppet film starts from 1910s. Similar to Europe, puppets in the films are controlled by strings which are usually hidden under the ground. Puppet film is popular in Hollywood from the beginning. Many special effects are added into the films. In 1979, director James Frawley create the first live-action film in the USA and the film is the start of the famous "Muppet Series".

In Asia, puppetry is more popular than puppet films. In the middle of 20th centuries, some Asian countries starts putting puppets into their animation films. In 1953, China creates its first puppet animation film Emperor's Dream. It is one of the earliest puppet films in Asia according to the current research.

== Film production process ==
=== The construction of puppets ===
Similar to Puppetry, all kinds of the puppets in the early 20th centuries are controlled by hands working. However, Not every puppet can be used in a film. While puppets in the puppetry perform in front of the stage, puppets in puppet films are recorded frame-by- frame by a camera. The puppets' height are usually around 30 centimetres. Their heads are made of wood, plastics or moulded rubber. To turn a puppet into a live character in the film, facial expression is crucial. Puppets‘ facial features are usually moveable so that they can behave like talking or sleeping A few puppets use plain face with repainted features to show the changes of characters' feelings. Moreover, Some studios will prepare different heads for puppets and changes them during the production process. Puppets also have three types of bodies. They are distinguished by the materials which have been mentioned above. After the invention of CGI, some puppets uses CGI and create more fantastic effect. The alien in the film E.T is a good example.

=== Settings and techniques ===
The scale of the scene is followed by the size of the puppets. To make such a scene, many small items are used in the beginning of puppet film, such as stones, sticks and boxes. A close-up shot is always used to make audiences focus more on characters' movements instead of the rough background. In the meantime, effects like earthquake are required in the puppet film. The setting needs more solid material. But considering the reflection of light on the object will cause unnecessary shine, the studios usually use flat enamel and lacquer.

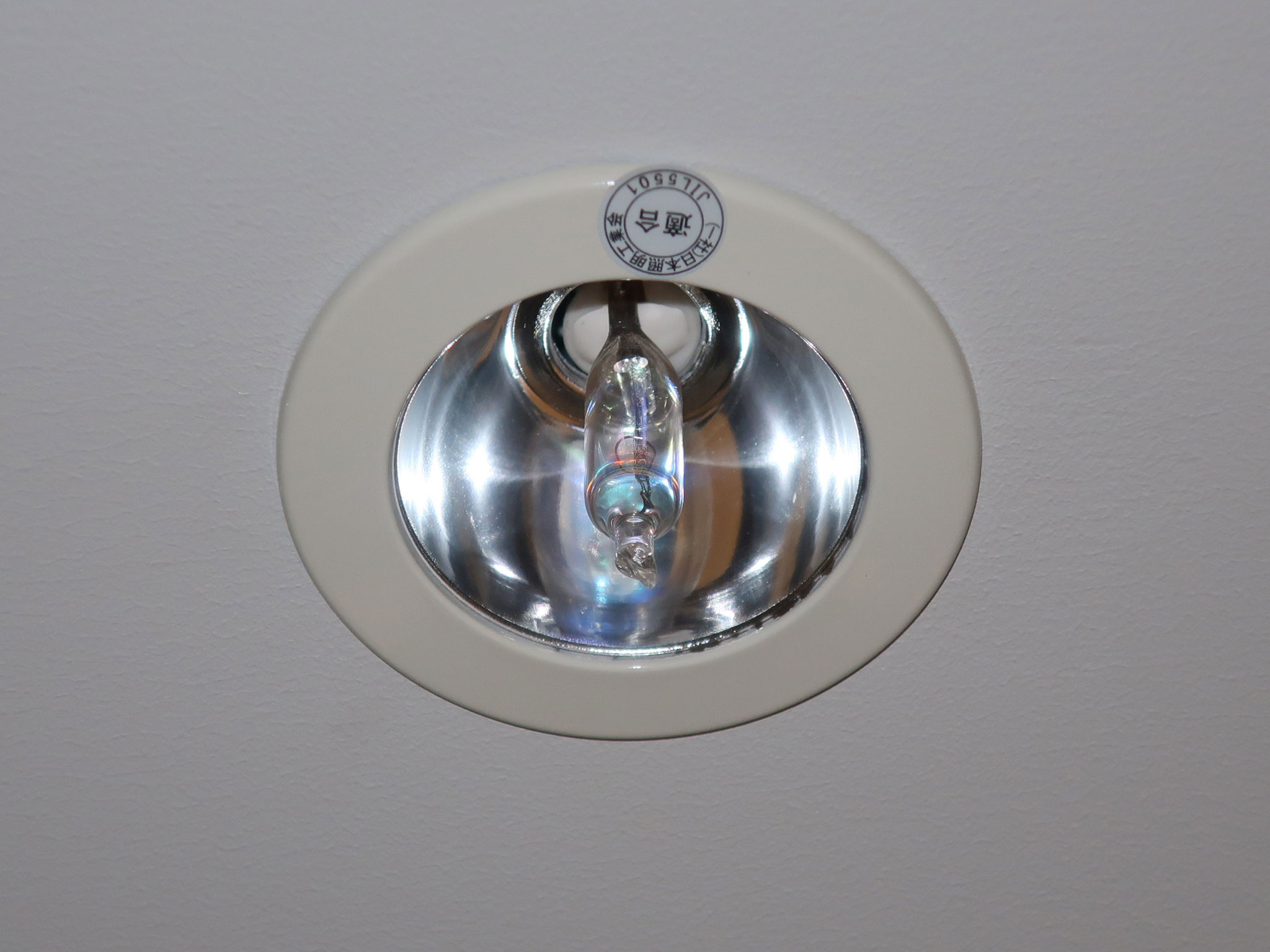
Halogen ceiling light

As the scene of puppet film is smaller than the real world, errors are easily expanded. So when setting the lighting, special equipment will be used. Halogen lamps are common devices in puppet films. The Halogen lighting unit is "small, lightweight and high mobile". Also, spotlights are set in the smallest position so that the extra light will be avoided.

Compare to cartoon or animation, it is much more difficult to add dialogues into puppet films. The timing must be critical as the sound is recorded before the movements. It is hard to catch the puppets' mouth movements in every sentence. So the studios prefer to eliminate the conversation in. the early puppet films and add more music and sound effects. The audiences need to derive the meaning by themselves. But with the development of technology, more and more dialogues are added after 1950s.

== Descriptions of some classical puppet films ==
With the development of technology, stop motion puppetry is discovered in 1900s. Dolly's Toys (1902) is considered as the first puppet film in history. It is made by British film Pioneer Arthur Melbourne-Cooper. It is about a boy's fantasy that all his toys come to life. Arthur Melbourne-Cooper is the creator of the world's first animation films. On the basis of Dolly's Toys, Arthur made another film which is Dreams of Toyland. Two films have similar plots . The story is always around children and their toys.

The Great Gabbo (1929) changes the plot. In this film, a ventriloquist who calls himself the Great Gabbo begins to lose his sense of identity when his only means of expression is through his wooden dummy. As the Great Gabbo begins to rely more and more on his dummy, he begins to go mad. The story is adapted from "Rival Dummy" by Ben Hecht. It brings the puppets to adult's world.

The Czech Year (1947) is directed by Jirí Trnka. Jirí Trnkais an animation director and he used to build an early puppet theatre. The Czech Year is his first feature film. In The Czech Year, It has six stories: "Shrovetide", "Spring", "Legend About St. Prokop", "The Fair", "The Feast" and "Bethlehem". Though the puppet design is simply due to the technology, the story is interesting and is full of life. The director begins to use puppet films to reflect the culture of their countries.

In 1949, Czech director Milos Makovec and Jirí Trnka directed The Emperor's Nightingale. The story is about a Chinese emperor. He prefers the tinkling of a bejewelled mechanical bird to the song of a real nightingale. When the Emperor is near death, a nightingale's song restores his health. In this film, eastern countries' culture is presented through a fairytale. The play shows traditional Chinese lion dance, puppetry, and a pair of tigers and pandas. In the meantime, It has "strong ethical components".

Tiny Hero(1953) is the first Chinese colour puppet film. It tells the story that brave children fight against a bad wolf and save other animals in the forest. It is produced by Shanghai Film Studio. Since then, China has created over 136 puppet films.

In the same year, US director Charles Walters made his first puppet film Lili. It is a love story in a carnival. LILI is an orphan. A crippled puppeteer Mel Ferrer treats Lili with contempt. However, he loves LILI. He only expresses his love through talking to his puppets. Lili is a sign of the early drama puppet film.

Thunderbirds Are GO (1966) is the start of the Thunderbird series. It is a science fiction story. The background of the film is in mid-2060s. The setting is in a secret base in the Pacific Ocean. Thunderbirds is a top life-saving organisation and the story. Anywhere in the world which has a serious disaster or accident can be immediately rushed to eliminate by Thunderbirds. It is directed by Gerry Anderson.

Devil Doll (1964) is a British horror puppet film. The main character Vorelli is a ventriloquist and a hypnotist. He owns a magic puppet which can behave like a real man. To get his purpose, he asks the puppet to kill people. A series of mysterious murders begins.The director Lindsay Shonteff is known as making crime thriller films. He puts many thriller elements into the puppet film. It is one of the earliest thriller puppet films.

The Ruka (1965) is also directed by Jirí Trnka. In The Ruka, a huge hand approaches a small happy potter and wants him to sculpt its statue. After the potter refusing his request, he uses different ways to threat him.It is a tragedy in the end. It is the final work of Jirí Trnka and it wins the highest animation award in his country. However, it is too dark and ironic to politics. It almost banned by the Communist Czechoslovak government at that time.

Mad Monster Party? (1967) is directed by Jules Bass. It is a fantasy story. Dr Frankenstein is retiring from the monster-making business and prepares an election. In the meantime, he discovers an important secret. The background of the film is Halloween and the film is full of interesting monster elements.

Puppet On A Chain (1971) is directed by Geoffrey Reeve. In the film, a U.S agent arrives in Amsterdam to investigate a heroin smuggling ring. The city is out of control and the police is unwilling to deal with it. He has to fight alone with those bad guys. It is an action and thriller puppet film.

The Muppet Movie (1979) is the first film of the Muppet series. The story starts from Frog Kermit who is approached by a Hollywood agent to audition for the chance of a lifetime. In his way to Hollywood, he meets several strange but interesting friends. They get together and a lot of funny things happens. It is directed by James Frawley. In 2004, Disney company purchased the copyright of Muppet Movie and made a new film which was The Muppet (2011).

== Influence ==
Though puppetry has a 4000 years history, few people are interested in puppetry nowadays since the story of puppetry is repetitive and the stage setting is too simple compared with modern films. Puppet film innovates in preserving the form of puppetry and combines it with films. Puppet film focuses on the storytelling as the core idea and enriches the character figure. Puppet film creates more fantastic stories and brings people deeper thoughts. Puppet film inherits the culture of puppetry and makes it more suitable for the modern trend.

Because of its differences from standard animation, the puppet film type inspires many fantastic ideas for the animation industry.

Furthermore, Puppet film motivates a new element in horror film. From the Puppet Master Series, more and more puppets appear as evil and horrible elements in modern films. Dead Silence is a good example.

== Highest-grossing films ==
This is a list of the highest-grossing puppet films. Puppet films feature puppets as lead characters. Animated films are not included. Films must gross at least $1 million.

Rank	Film	Worldwide gross	Year	Reference
1	Project Hail Mary	$684,451,526	2026	
2	The Muppets	$171,802,998	2011	
3	Gremlins	$148,168,459	1984	
4	Forgetting Sarah Marshall	$105,833,261	2008	
5	Muppets Most Wanted	$80,383,290	2014	
6	The Muppet Movie	$76,657,000	1979	
7	Team America: World Police	$50,907,422	2004	
8	The Dark Crystal	$41,613,957	1982	
9	Gremlins 2: The New Batch	$41,482,207	1990	
10	Pinocchio	$41,314,585	2002	
11	Little Shop of Horrors	$39,068,905	1986	
12	Muppet Treasure Island	$34,327,391	1996	
13	The Great Muppet Caper	$31,206,251	1981	
14	The Muppet Christmas Carol	$29,192,434	1992	
15	The Happytime Murders	$27,506,452	2018	
16	The Muppets Take Manhattan	$25,534,703	1984	
17	Being John Malkovich	$22,863,596	1999	
18	Dead Silence	$22,382,047	2007	
19	Muppets from Space	$22,323,612	1999	
20	The Country Bears	$18,012,097	2002	
21	The Adventures of Pinocchio	$15,094,530	1996	
22	Sesame Street Presents: Follow that Bird	$13,961,370	1985	
23	Labyrinth	$13,723,253	1986	
24	Barney's Great Adventure	$12,218,638	1998	
25	The Adventures of Elmo in Grouchland	$11,683,047	1999	
26	Five Children and It	$5,072,125	2004	
27	31 Minutes: The Movie	$1,254,585	2008	
28	Mystery Science Theater 3000: The Movie	$1,007,306	1996	

== See also ==
- List of puppet films
