= Staré pověsti české =

Staré pověsti české can refer to:

- Staré pověsti české - an 1894 book by Alois Jirásek known in English as "Ancient Bohemian Legends"
- Staré pověsti české (film) - the puppet animation film adaptation by Jiri Trnka
