= La Peste (disambiguation) =

La Peste is a 1947 absurdist novel (English title The Plague) by Albert Camus.

La Peste may also refer to:

- La Peste (album), the second studio album by Alabama 3, released in 2000
- La Peste (film), a 1992 Argentine-French-British drama film, also known as The Plague
- La peste (TV series), a Spanish historical drama television series, originally aired during 2018–2019
- La Peste (band), a Boston-based punk rock band active from 1976–1982
- La Peste (grave site), a mass grave site in Caracas, Venezuela

== See also ==
- Disiz La Peste, former stage name of French rapper and actor Sérigne M'Baye Gueye
- El año de la peste, a 1978 Mexican drama-thriller film
- El retrato de la peste, a 2008 Argentine stop motion-animated short film
- La Peste Negra, a former Mexican wrestling stable (group)
- La piste, a 2006 French film
- The Plague (disambiguation)
