= Springman and the SS =

- Directed by: Jiří Trnka; Jiří Brdečka
- Written by: Ota Šafránek (story); Jiří Brdečka; Jiří Trnka
- Cinematography: Vladimír Novotný
- Music by: Jan Rychlík
- Production company: Bratři v triku
- Distributed by: Státní půjčovna filmů
- Release date: 20 December 1946
- Running time: 14 minutes
- Country: Czechoslovakia

Springman and the SS (Czech: Pérák a SS) is a 1946 Czechoslovak superhero animated short film directed by Jiří Trnka featuring Pérák, the Spring Man of Prague. The film is also known as The Chimney Sweep in the United States. The film competed at 1946 Cannes Film Festival.

== Plot ==
A chimney sweep disguises as a Spring-heeled Jack-like figure during the Nazi occupation. The heroic and mischievous black-clad "Springer", with a mask fashioned out of a sock and defying the curfew, is capable of performing fantastic leaps due to having couch springs attached to his shoes. He taunts the occupying German army sentries and the Gestapo before escaping in a surrealistic, slapstick chase across the darkened city.

== Cultural impact ==
Trnka's postwar interpretation of Pérák as a quasi-superhero formed the basis for sporadic revivals of the character in Czech science fiction and comic book stories.

== Home release ==
Pérák a SS is featured in a DVD anthology of World War II propaganda cartoons, Cartoons for Victory, which was released on 2 May 2006.
