= List of live-action puppet films =

This is a list of live-action puppet films. They use string or some other form of arm assistant. These films should not be confused with stop-motion animation which use frame by frame technique.

== 1920s-1960s ==
- The Great Gabbo (1929)
- The Limejuice Mystery or Who Spat in Grandfather's Porridge? (1930) - UK
- Puppet Show (1936) - USA
- The Emperor's Dream (1947) - Chinese
- Lili (1953) - USA
- The Spirit of Christmas (1953) - USA
- Thunderbirds Are GO (1966) - UK
- Thunderbird 6 (1968) - UK
- The Muppet Musicians of Bremen (1969) - USA
- Hey, Cinderella! (1969) - USA/Canada

== 1970s ==
- Pufnstuf (1970) - USA
- The Great Santa Claus Switch (1970) - USA
- The Frog Prince (1971 film) (1971) - USA/Canada
- The Investigator (1971) - USA
- Let My Puppets Come (1976) - USA
- Emmet Otter's Jug-Band Christmas (1977) - USA
- Magic (1978) - USA
- The Muppet Movie (1979) - USA

== 1980s ==
- The Empire Strikes Back (1980) - USA
- Captain Scarlet vs. the Mysterons (1981) - UK
- Revenge of the Mysterons from Mars (1981) - UK
- The Great Muppet Caper (1981) - USA
- The Dark Crystal (1982) - USA/UK
- Return of the Jedi (1983) - USA
- The Neverending Story (1984) - USA/West Germany
- The Muppets Take Manhattan (1984) - USA
- Sesame Street Presents: Follow That Bird (1985) - USA
- Labyrinth (1986) - UK
- The Christmas Toy (1986) - USA/Canada
- The Tale of the Bunny Picnic (1986) - USA/UK
- Little Shop of Horrors (1986) - USA
- Superstar: The Karen Carpenter Story (1987) - USA
- Meet the Feebles (1989) - New Zealand
- Monster Maker (1989) - USA
- Puppet Master (1989) - USA (film series)

== 1990s ==
- The NeverEnding Story II: The Next Chapter (1990) - USA/West Germany
- The Witches (1990) - USA
- Dolly Dearest (1991) - USA
- Muppet*Vision 3D (1991) - USA
- Naked Lunch (1991) - USA
- The Muppet Christmas Carol (1992) - USA
- Dollman vs. Demonic Toys (1993) - USA
- Mr. Willowby's Christmas Tree (1995) - USA
- Muppet Treasure Island (1996) - USA
- Mystery Science Theater 3000: The Movie (1996) - USA
- Buddy (1997) - USA
- A Rat's Tale (1997) - Germany/US
- Barney's Great Adventure (1998) - USA
- The Adventures of Elmo in Grouchland (1999) - USA
- Being John Malkovich (1999) - USA
- Muppets from Space (1999) - USA
- Ragdoll (1999) - USA

== 2000s ==
- Legend of the Sacred Stone (2000) - Taiwanese
- Rat (2000) - USA
- The Book of Pooh: Stories from the Heart (2001) - USA
- Kermit's Swamp Years (2002) - USA
- The Country Bears (2002) - USA
- It's a Very Merry Muppet Christmas Movie (2002) - USA
- Good Boy! (2003) - USA
- Five Children and It (2003) - USA/UK/France
- Strings (2004) - Denmark/Norway/Sweden/UK
- Team America: World Police (2004) - USA
- The Muppets' Wizard of Oz (2005) - USA
- MirrorMask (2005) - USA/UK
- Dante's Inferno (2007) - USA
- Dead Silence (2007) - USA
- 31 minutos, la película (2008) - Chile/Brazil/Spain
- Forgetting Sarah Marshall (2008) - USA

== 2010s ==
- The Beaver (2011) - USA
- The Muppets (2011) - USA
- The Greyness of Autumn - (2012) - Scotland
- Muppets Most Wanted (2014) - USA
- Lessons Learned (2014, short film) - USA
- Scooby-Doo! Adventures: The Mystery Map (2014) - USA
- Beaster Day: Here Comes Peter Cottonhell - USA
- Turkey Hollow (2015) - USA/Canada
- The Happytime Murders (2018) - USA

== 2020s ==
- Gulabo Sitabo - (2020) - India
- Autumn Never Dies - (2020) - Scotland
- A Fairy Tale After All (2022) - USA
- The rise and fall of the Chop Chop Show (2022) - Argentina
- Abruptio (2023) - USA
- The Fox (2025) - Australia
- Project Hail Mary (2026) - USA
- The Rainbow Fish (2026) - Germany
- Untitled Labyrinth spin-off sequel (TBA) - USA
- Muppet Man (TBA) - USA

== See also ==
- List of highest-grossing puppet films
- List of stop motion films
