= František Muzika =

Czech artist (1900–1974)

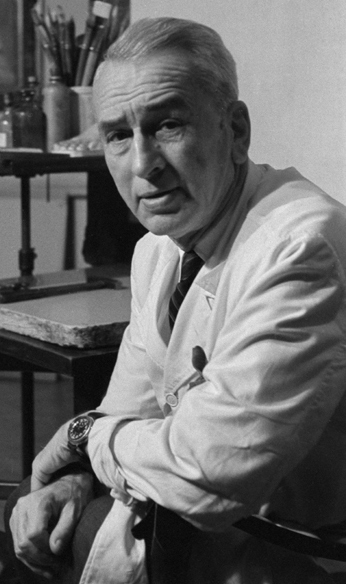
- Portrait of František Muzika by Karel Kuklík, 1960s
- Born: 26 June 1900; Prague, Austria-Hungary
- Died: 1 November 1974 (aged 74); Prague, Czechoslovakia
- Known for: painting; scenography

František Muzika (26 June 1900 – 1 November 1974) was a Czech artist. He was a prominent representative of avant-garde in Czechoslovakia in the first half of the 20th century.

Muzika was a painter, graphic designer, stage designer, illustrator, editor and professor at the Academy of Arts, Architecture and Design in Prague.

== Biography ==
Muzika was born in Prague. He was a member of Devětsil since 1921 and Mánes since 1923. After finishing his study at the Academy of Arts, Prague in 1924, he received a one-year scholarship from the French government for studying at École des Beaux-Arts. In Paris he also received private lessons from František Kupka at his atelier. In Paris he met Max Jacob, who took him to meet Léonce Rosenberg. On Sundays he had regular meetings with Joseph Bernard, where he also met Maillol and Bissière, with whom he exhibited at Salon d'Automne.

In 1925, after he returned from Paris, his experiences with the work of Georges Braque and Pablo Picasso led Muzika to change his style of painting.

"Over the course of more than fifty years, Muzika’s work thus underwent several developmental changes. It always, however, remained faithful to itself and to the starting points of Muzika’s generation. It never let itself to be tempted down the wrong path by briefly fashionable trends or cheaply earned successes; it never got bogged down in the stagnant waters of convention or dissipated in its own discoveries and approaches".

In his final years, he suffered from cardiac disease. He died 1 November 1974 in his atelier, with his final, unfinished work, "Staircase" ("Schodiště") on the easel.

== Paintings ==
=== First period (1918–1924) ===
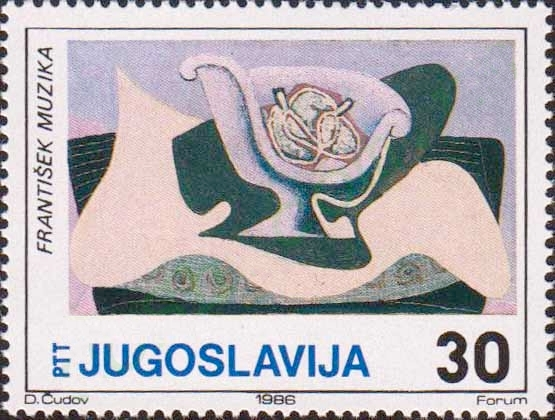
Still life by Muzika on a 1986 Yugoslavian stamp

At first Muzika was influenced by Bohumil Kubišta. His first paintings portrayed still lifes and architecture. He then shifted to a primitivist neoclassicism. He focused on pastoral scenes and everyday life.

=== Second period (1925–1936) ===
After Paris he radically revised his artistic poetics. Objects lost their material character. His painting style relaxed. He created a new pictorial reality that took the form of Lyrical Cubism. After 1930, Muzika involved surrealist elements in his process. The poetics of Muzika's pictures were influenced by the work of Giorgio de Chirico and Muzika's own experiences as a stage designer.

=== Third period (1936 – about 1948) ===
Muzika reacted to the Spanish Civil War, the occupation of Czechoslovakia, and the brutality of war. Muzika's wartime period shows the torment and grief of this tragic time with allegorical pictures. His paintings with imaginary landscapes, dark atmospheres, and jarring metaphors created the feeling of dramatic tension and darkness of the time.

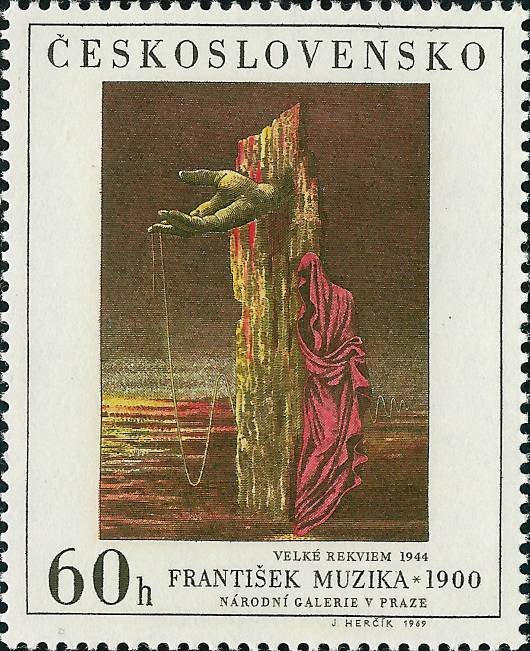
Czechoslovak postage stamp 1969 -- F. Muzika, 'Velké rekviem'

=== The post–war period ===
"During the post-war period František Muzika developed his own original poetics that, in close accord with the trends of contemporary international art, elaborated further the original orientation of his poetical vision of the world."

=== Final years (1948–1974) ===
Muzika's topic of his paintings was the fossilized world. Muzika erased the differences between the real and unreal, the microcosm and macrocosm. His works emphasized heavy symbolism.

== Other work ==
Muzika illustrated a 1935 edition of R.U.R. by Karel Čapek

In 1927 Muzika started to expand to other fields, such as stage design and book illustrations. He was an editor of cultural magazines. One example of his 107-stage designs is "Julietta" by Bohuslav Martinů in the Czech National Theatre (1938). In 1927 he started his work on the book Krásné písmo (a history of Latin script), which was published in 1958 in Czechoslovakia and Schöne Schrift in 1965, in German. He also designed many posters; for example, he did a poster for Emil Filla's exhibition and for Prague Spring 1946 and 1947. His symbol from the poster is still the logo for Prague Spring International Music Festival (Pražské jaro) today.

He illustrated many books, including Karel Čapek's R.U.R.

Muzika's pupils included Daniela Havlíčková and Eliška Konopiská.

== Exhibitions ==
Muzika's paintings and drawings are in many Czech and foreign galleries, as well as in the Centre Pompidou, Paris. Muzika had many exhibitions in Czechoslovakia, beginning in 1922.

=== International group exhibits ===
Invitation from Gallery André François Petit to the exhibition 'Obsessions et Visions'

- 1948 – Biennale Venice
- 1964 – Biennale Venice
- 1968 – Obsessions et Visions, Gallery André François Petit, Paris

(exhibited together with Giorgio de Chirico, Max Ernst, Salvador Dalí, René Magritte)

- 1969 – Surrealism in Europe, Baukunst Gallery, Cologne, Germany
- 1969 – "Phases", Musee d'Ixelles, Brussels

=== International solo exhibits ===
- 1965 – Galleria del Naviglio, Milan, Italy
- 1965 – Galleria del Cavallino, Venice, Italy
- 1967 – Galerie Maya, Brussels, Belgium
- 1971 – Lambert Monet Art Gallery, Geneva, Switzerland
- 1972 – Baukunst Galerie, Cologne, Germany

=== International stage design exhibits ===
- Vienna 1935
- Milano 1936
- Paris 1937
- São Paulo 1959
- Touring exhibition, South America 1960–1963

=== International awards ===
- 1937 – 2 awards—exhibition in Paris (stage design)
- 1939 – 2 awards VI. Triennale, Milan
- 1959 – Gold Medal – books graphics, Leipzig, Germany

=== Czechoslovak awards ===
- 1939—Honor award—Society of Bibliophiles
- 1949—State award for book design
- 1961—Meritorious Artist (Zasloužilý umělec), for graphic work and pedagogic work
- 1964—Award for book "Krásné Písmo" (Státní nakladatelství krásné literatury a umění)
- 1966—Award and medal "Řád Práce" for lifetime art work and for theoretical and pedagogic work

=== Posters ===
- Prague Spring (international music festival) 1946, 1947, 1981

Page with the logo (f or forte) from Muzika's poster adorning the Rudolfinum during the annual festival

- E. Filla exhibition 1947
- J. Wagner exhibition 1957

== Literature ==
- Šmejkal, František: František Muzika. Odeon Prague, 1966 (in Czech).
