= Daniela Havlíčková =

Czech printmaker

Daniela Havlíčková (18 April 1946 – 21 July 1999) was a Czech printmaker.

A native of Prague, Havlíčková studied under Jiří Trnka, Zdeněk Sklenář and František Muzika at the Academy of Arts, Architecture and Design in Prague, from which she graduated in 1971. During her career she exhibited extensively both in her native country and abroad. A member of the artists' group Hollar, she died in Prague.

A 1984 mixed-media work by Havlíčková, Zongléri/Jugglers, is owned by the National Gallery of Art.
