= Václav Trojan =

20th-century Czech music educator and composer

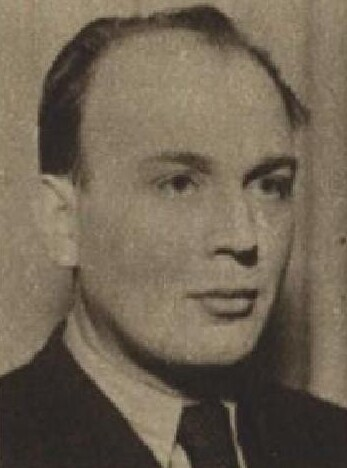
- Trojan in 1942
- Born: 24 April 1907; Plzeň, Kingdom of Bohemia, Austria-Hungary
- Died: 5 July 1983 (aged 76)

Václav Trojan (24 April 1907, Plzeň – 5 July 1983) was a Czech composer of classical music best known for his film scores. Trojan studied composition at the Prague Conservatory under Jaroslav Křička and Otakar Ostrčil from 1923 to 1927. He continued his studies in the composition masterclasses of Alois Hába, Josef Suk and Vítězslav Novák until 1929. A composer and arranger of dance and jazz music in the 1930s, he was a music director for Radio Prague from 1937 to 1945. After the end of World War II, Trojan composed most frequently for film, stage and radio, and developed a close association with director Jiří Trnka, earning international fame for his music for Trnka's popular animated puppet films. Trojan's music is mostly written in a neo-classical style, and he often drew inspiration from the traditions of Czech folk music. In 1940 he was given the Czech National Prize for his remarkable children’s opera Kolotoč (‘The Merry-Go-Round’), and in 1960 the K. Gottwald State Prize for his music for Sen noci svatojánské (‘A Midsummer Night’s Dream’).

== Works ==
Orchestral Compositions

- Merry-go-round. Suite from an opera (1940) 24'
- Tarantella for symphonic orchestra (1940), CHF, r SU 5'
- Fairy-tale for symphonic orchestra (1946), CR 5'
- The Emperor's Nightingale. Suite from a film (1950), CHF, PA 33'
- A Procession through Antique Prague, for brasses and timpani (1956–57)
- Tarantella di Taranto, for symphonic orchestra (1957), CHF 3,5'
- Fairy-tales for accordion and orchestra (1959), SU, r SU, CRo 22'
- Sinfonietta armoniosa for chamber orchestra (1970), PA, o PA 16,5'
- Humorous Variations on the theme of the Spring Song by Felix Mendelssohn-Bartholdy (1936, revised 1971 ), CHF, PA 34'
- Poetic Suite (1972), CHF 28'
- Shakespeare' s Smile. Six scenes inspired by Shakespeare's comedies for large orchestra (1972), CHF 24'
- Four Caricatures (with one added) for wind orchestra, percussion instruments and piano (1974), CHF 13'
- Concertino for solo trumpet and small orchestra (1977), CHF 12'
- A Midsummer Night' s Dream. Suite from a ballet pantomime (1982)

Chamber Compositions

- Passionato for two violins, viola and 2 violoncellos (1927), CHF 15'
- Wind Quintet on the subjects of folk songs (1937), SU, r SU 20'
- Variations form string quartet "The Famous Mono- logues by Mosna" (1944)
- The Ruined Cathedral, for solo accordion (1958), SU, r SU 5'
- The Chicken Polka for accordion (1960), SU 5'
- Tarantella in the arrangement for 2 accordions (1965), PA 5'
- Prince Bayaya. Fairy-tale suite for violin, guitar and accordion (1967), CHF 22'
- The Emperor' s Nightingale. Suite from the film of the same name for violin, guitar and accordion (1969), PA 22'
- Folk Songs from Bohemia, Moravia and Slovakia for violin, guitar and accordion (1970)
- Nightingale and the Death (from the film music of The Emperor's Nightingale) for violin and piano (1970), PA
- Folk Songs and Carols for accordion (1973), PA
- Divertimento for wind quintet (1977), CHF, SU, r SU 12'
- Nonetto favoloso, for flute, oboe, clarinet, bassoon, French horn, violin, viola, violoncello and double-bass "On the Gallant Knight Bayaya" (1977), CHF 17'

Vocal Arrangements and Stylizations of Folk Songs

- Children' s Games. Suite for children' s choir and or chestra (1936), CR 15'
- Our Country in Song and Dance. Cantata for solos, mixed choir and orchestra (1936) 45'
- Humour in Folk Song. Cantata for tenor, baritone. children' s choir and orchestra (1938)
- From Bohemia to Moravia, for solos, mixed choir and orchestra (1940) 20'
- Christmas Songs for solos, mixed choir, orchestra and organ (1940) 40'
- Folk Songs from Plzeň Region for tenor and wind quintet (1942), CHF, r SU 20'
- Folk Songs from the Region below the Giant Mountains, for solos, mixed choir and orchestra (1946), CR 20'
- Czech Pastorales for children' s (or female) choir and solos, with the accompaniment of 2 accordions and percussion instruments (ad lib.) or piano (1966), CHF, PA 9'
- Czech and Slovak Folk Songs for voice and piano (1967) CHF, PA, r PA (selection entitled "I Am Your Song") 104'
- Folk Songs from Czechoslovakia for male choir (1978)
- Three Czech and Four Moravian Songs for female and male chamber choir, with the accompaniment of flute, triangle and tambourine (1978), CHF 8,5'
- Silesian Ditties for female choir and piano (1978)

Other Vocal Compositions

- Špalíček. Suite for children' s choir and piano from the puppet film of the same name, in the arrangement of Milan Solc (1968), SU 45'
- Military Song. Small cantata on the words of Ladislav Dvorsky for children' s choir, solos and chamber orchestra (1971), Czechoslovak Television Ostrava 7'
- Frivolous Alphabet. Songs for children' s choir and piano, to the texts by Vaclav Fischer (1976), PA 50'

Stage Works

- Merry-go-round. A whole-evening opera for both little and big children in six pictures on the libretto by M. Charousova-Gardavska (1936–39), DILIA, r SU (stage sets)
- The Golden Gate. A whole-evening scenic poem for solos, ensembles and orchestra after popular motifs on the libretto by Karel Plicka (1971–73), SU (two parts), r SU
- A Midsummer Night' s dream. Ballet pantomime (1982), DILIA
- Prince Bayaya. Fairytale Ballet (finished by Jan Klusák, 1986), DILIA

Film music

- Zasadil dědek řepu (1945) - his first cooperation with Jiří Trnka
- Špalíček (1947)
- Císařův slavík (1949)
- Prince Bayaya (1950) - in 1980 Trojan rearranged the original score of Bajaja for acoustic and electrophonic accordion.
- Staré pověsti české (1953)
- Osudy dobrého vojáka Švejka (1955)
- Sen noci svatojánské (‘A Midsummer Night’s Dream’) (1959)
- Vodníkův mlýn
- Žabák

== Literature on Václav Trojan ==
- Vladimír Bor - Štěpán Lucký: Trojan. Film music, KLHU 1958
- Jan Vičar: Vaclav Trojan, PA 1989
- Jiří Pilka - Antonín Matzner: Česká filmová hudba (Czech Film Music), Dauphin 2002

== Sources ==
- Milan Kuna. The New Grove Dictionary of Opera, edited by Stanley Sadie (1992). ISBN 0-333-73432-7 and ISBN 1-56159-228-5
