= The Hand (1965 film) =

- Directed by: Jiří Trnka
- Written by: Jiří Trnka
- Music by: Václav Trojan
- Distributed by: Krátký Film Praha
- Release date: October 26, 1965
- Running time: 18 minutes
- Country: Czechoslovakia
- Language: Czech

The Hand (Czech: Ruka) is a 1965 Czechoslovak stop motion puppet animation film directed by Jiří Trnka. It was to be Trnka's final film. The Hand was positively received by critics and viewers, with some considering it one of the best animated shorts of all time.

The film was first released in 1965. When Trnka died in 1969, the film was banned due to its story that reflects a restrictive environment in which many artists had to work.

== Plot ==
The film features a conflict between a powerless Harlequin and a powerful Hand. Harlequin is an artist who makes Sculptures. He is commanded by The Hand to make only sculptures of it making a symbolic gesture, but Harlequin decides to resist the Hand as he wishes to make ceramic pots for his flowers. The Hand tries to change his mind by threatening him, manipulating him or by causing trouble for him.

The Hand eventually catches Harlequin with a trick and locks him in a cage where he makes the ordered Statue. The Hand rewards him with medals and laurels, but he becomes sad and decides to escape. He brings down the statue and makes a hole in the cage. He jumps out of the cage and runs away while being chased by the Hand. As he runs, he throws away all of his medals and laurels. He gets home in the end and barricades himself there. As he barricades himself in a closet, a pot with a flower falls on him. Harlequin falls to the floor and sees his beloved flowers as he dies. When the Hand gets into the House, Harlequin is already dead. The Hand, now wearing a different glove, uses the closet as a coffin for Harlequin and makes a pompous funeral for him, before expressing a new gesture.

== Legacy ==
Jiří Trnka Memorial that was unveiled in Plzeň on 17 November 2015, commemorates The Hand.

Time Out listed The Hand in its list of top 30 animated shorts of all time.

In a Reddit AMA, Rebecca Sugar, creator of the Cartoon Network show Steven Universe named The Hand as having a major influence on her work.

== Awards ==
List of awards received by The Hand:

- Jury Special Prize, Annecy, 1965
- First Prize in Category of Cartoons, Bergamo, 1965
- Silver Prize, Melbourne, 1966
- Best Film of All Festival Years (Award from Critics), Annecy, 1990
