= Jiří Brdečka =

Czech writer, artist and film director

- Born: 24 December 1917; Hranice, Moravia, Austria-Hungary
- Died: 2 June 1982 (aged 64); Prague, Czechoslovakia
- Occupations: Screenwriter, film director, novelist, cartoonist animator
- Years active: 1944–1982
- Children: Tereza Brdečková

Jiří Brdečka (24 December 1917 – 2 June 1982) was a Czech screenwriter, film director, writer and artist. His most famous literary and cinematic work is Lemonade Joe (1964).

== Life ==
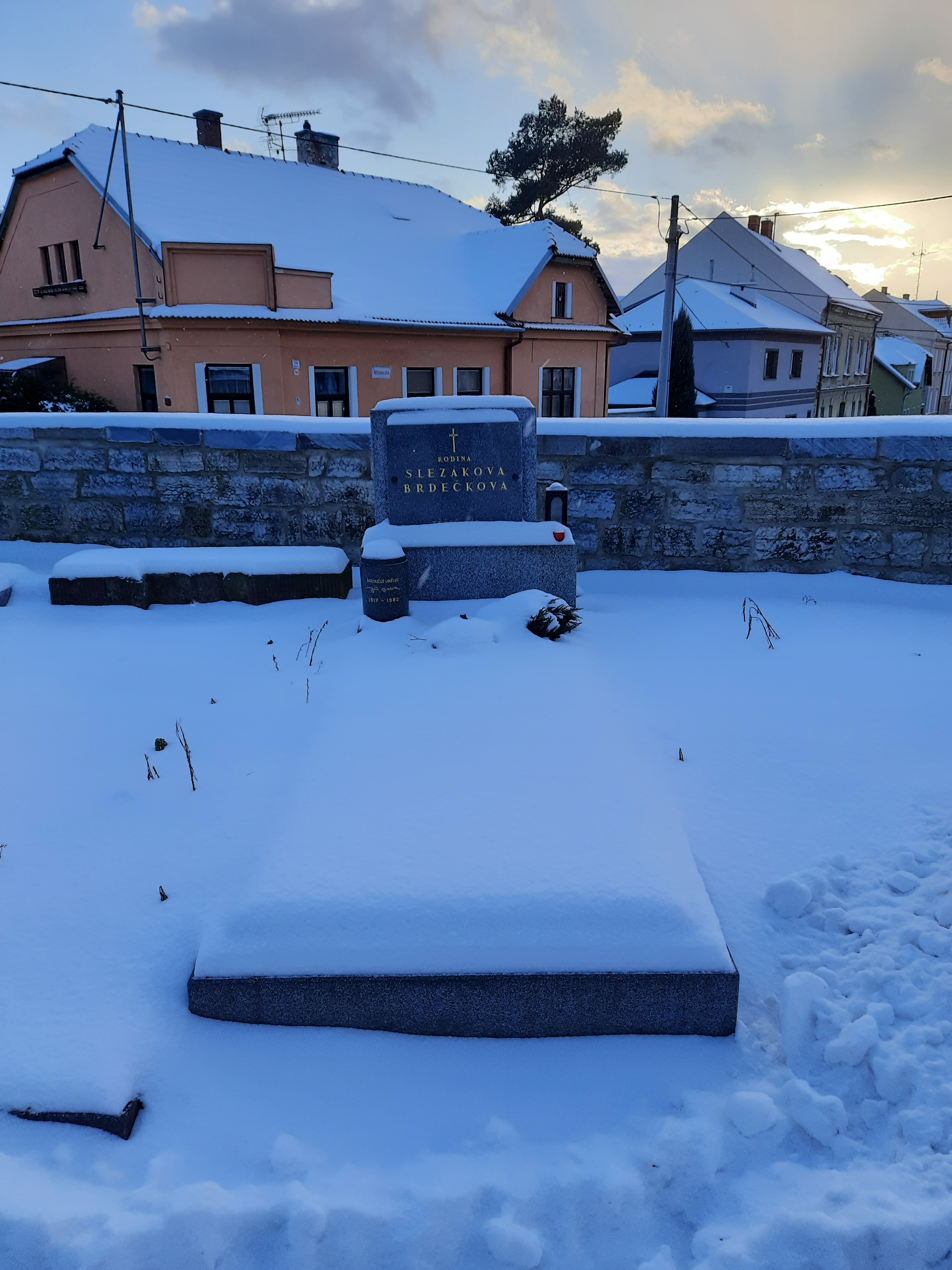
Grave of Jiří Brdečka and his family in Hranice

Jiří Josef František Brdečka was born in Hranice on 24 December 1917 to a literary family. His father, Otakar Brdečka (1881–1930), was a writer under the pseudonym Alfa. He graduated from the high school in Hranice, then he studied philosophy and aesthetics at the Charles University in Prague until 1939, when the school was closed as a result of the occupation of Czechoslovakia by Nazi Germany. He then became an administrative clerk at the City of Prague Museum and found occasional work as a newspaper journalist and cartoonist. He got this job thanks to Jan Drda, who was his roommate during his student years.

He worked as a press agent for the film studio Lucernafilm from summer 1941 to the end of 1942. In 1942, Brdečka took a job as an animator in the AFIT studio, and from 1949 until 1973 he was working as a screenwriter and film director at Barrandov Studios. At the same time, from 1958, he began directing animated films on his own in the Bratři v triku studio. In addition to his film work, he also worked as a journalist, film critic and novelist. Brdečka's work is marked by its droll intellectual humor, often featuring an extensive use of hyperbole, satire and literary allusions. Brdečka also worked as a painter and was generally considered a "Renaissance man".

Brdečka married in 1969. He had one daughter, the writer and film critic Tereza Brdečková (born 1957). Her husband is the musician, songwriter and writer Jiří Dědeček. Since 2013, Brdečková and her husband have been running the family publishing house Limonádový Joe, focused on the legacy of Jiří Brdečka and on her own work.

Brdečka died on 2 June 1982 in Prague, aged 64. He is buried at the cemetery in his hometown of Hranice.

== Work ==
Brdečka most often worked as a screenwriter. He had a fondness for the Wild West, and thanks to this, his most famous work, the parody Lemonade Joe was created. It was first a series of short stories, then a theatre play, and finally a film. He collaborated with prominent figures in Czech cinema, such as Jan Werich, Jiří Trnka and Oldřich Lipský.

As a film director, he mainly worked in the field of short animated films. His most successful film was Špatně namalovaná slepice, which won the Grand Prix award at Annecy International Animation Film Festival. Although he became known abroad thanks to his cartoons, today most of these films are forgotten and Brdečka is remembered primarily as the author of screenplays for successful film comedies.

== Selected works ==
=== Film director ===
- Wedding in the Coral Sea (1944)
- Springman and the SS (1946)
- Špatně namalovaná slepice (1963)

=== Screenwriter ===
- Springman and the SS (1946)
- The Emperor's Nightingale (1948)
- The Emperor and the Golem (1951)
- Old Czech Legends (1951)
- Lost Children (1956)
- The Fabulous World of Jules Verne (1958)
- A Midsummer Night's Dream (1959)
- The Fabulous Baron Munchausen (1961)
- The Cassandra Cat (1963)
- Lemonade Joe (1964)
- Dinner for Adele (1977)
- The Prince and the Evening Star (1979)
- The Mysterious Castle in the Carpathians (1981)

=== Books ===
- Limonádový Joe (1946) – Wild West parody
- Kolty bez pozlátka (1956) – popular educational text about real Wild West figures
- Faunovo značně pokročilé odpoledne (1966) – collection of humorous stories
