= Eliška Konopiská =

Czech artist

Eliška Konopiská (born 5 January 1948) is a Czech printmaker, graphic artist, typographer, and illustrator.

== Life and career ==
A native of Prague, Konopiská graduated from that city's Academy of Arts, Architecture and Design, where she studied with František Muzika.

Active in a variety of genres, she has designed and illustrated many books, and has also worked as a typographer for a variety of publishing houses. Her work has been exhibited both in the Czech Republic and abroad, and she has won a variety of awards during her career. Her 1983 print Hra (Play), a color aquatint and etching, is owned by the National Gallery of Art.
