= Lenn Redman =

American novelist

Lenn Redman (1912 Chicago –1987 Los Angeles) was an artist, caricaturist, animator, author, poet, illustrator, entertainer, cartoonist and civil rights activist.

Lenn Redman (also known as Leonard Redman, Len Redman) was born in Chicago, Illinois. His mother Sarah Brooks-Redman was born in Chicago. His father, Victor Redman migrated from Ladyzhinka, Russia. His parents owned "Redman's" a clothing store in Chicago. His sister's Ruth Redman-Greenwood and Florence Redman-Green were also artists. His only son Mark, resides in Oakwood, Georgia. His career spanned more than 50 years.

== Books ==
- "How To Draw Caricatures",
- "What am I"? series of books that was first published in 1980. The National Conference of Christians and Jews printed and distributed a million copies in commemoration of National Brotherhood Week. The series is a masterpiece in Diversity Awareness/Education.

=== Cartoonist ===
- Cartoonist for Leon Schlesinger Studios where he was an animator for Porky Pig
- Commercial Art Studio cartooning instructor
- Chicago Tribune where he drew Mary Worth comic strip

=== Caricaturist ===
- Caricaturist at the 1933 World's Fair
- Caricaturist on the 'You Asked For It' TV variety show

=== Animator ===
- Cartoonist for Walt Disney Studios where he was an animator for Fantasia (Sorcerer's Apprentice)
- Cartoon animator for Filmation Associates
- Cartoon animator for Hanna-Barbera Productions
- The Archie Show (1968) TV Series (animator)
- The Adventures of Batman and Robin the Boy Wonder (1969) TV Series (animator)
- Archie's Fun House (1970) TV Series (animator) (as Lenn Redman)

=== Books ===
- Author of 'What Am I?' (1980)
- Author of A Parents' and Teachers' What Am I? Guide for Children (1981)
- Author of 'How To Draw Caricatures' (1984)
