= La Peste (grave site) =

La Peste is the name given to a series of graves dug in a sector of the Southern General Cemetery in Caracas, excavated by the Caracas Metropolitan Police and the National Guard of Venezuela to bury hundreds of bodies, including victims of the Caracazo. La Peste was the largest mass grave found in Venezuela up to that time.

One of the burials took place on March 3, 1989, when about thirty unidentified and decomposing bodies were transferred. Months later, new unrecorded burials came to light, in response to which the National Congress opened an investigation.

In October 1990, Enrique Ochoa Antich, coordinator of the Committee for Human Rights of the MAS Secretariat for Human Rights and of the Committee of Relatives of the Victims (COFAVIC), together with Liliana Ortega and Laurence Quijada, filed a complaint before the Tenth Criminal Court, presided over by Judge Saúl Ron Brasch, regarding the condition of the Cementerio General del Sur, without mentioning the cases related to the Caracazo in order to bypass military jurisdiction, eventually managing to have two mass graves exhumed. The procedure involved forensic archaeologist Clyde Snow and experts from Argentina. However, in 1991, the military justice system took over the case, removed jurisdiction from the ordinary courts, and closed the exhumations.

== Bibliography ==
- Montes de Oca, Rodolfo (2022). Sospechosos habituales. Diez aproximaciones a los antecedentes históricos del movimiento por los derechos humanos en Venezuela (1936-1999) (PDF). Caracas: Edición del Programa Venezolano de Educación-Acción en Derechos Humanos (PROVEA). ISBN 978-980-6544-74-1.
