= The Cybernetic Grandma =

1962 film

- Directed by: Jiří Trnka
- Screenplay by: Jiří Trnka
- Story by: Ivan Klíma
- Produced by: Jiří Vaněk; Jaroslav Možíš; Erma Kmínková
- Cinematography: Jiří Šafář; Ivan Renč
- Edited by: Hana Walachová; Helena Lebdušková (assistant uncredited)
- Music by: Jan Novák
- Production companies: Loutkový film Praha; Krátký film Praha
- Distributed by: Ústřední půjčovna filmu
- Release date: October 26, 1962
- Running time: 29 minutes
- Language: Czech

The Cybernetic Grandma (Czech: Kybernetická babička) is a 1962 Czechoslovak stop motion puppet cartoon. It is a surreal science fiction-horror animation film, showing a dystopian situation where machines tend humans into a cybernetic lifestyle. The story is seen through the eyes of a little child who is led by his grandmother to enter an underground world. There it witnesses many strange events and ends up being cared for by a cybernetic grandma looking like a hybrid between a robotic wheelchair and a giant moth. The film shows a contradiction between the kind and sweet way the machine talks to the child and its disturbingly cold insensitive behavior. The cybernetic grandma is portrayed by the mechanically accurate and formally perfect voice and language of Czech actress Otýlie Benšíková. At the end of the movie, the little child is rescued by its true biological grandma, who turns off the cybernetic one and takes care of it.
