= The Portrait of the Pestilence =

- Spanish: El Retrato de la Peste
- Directed by: Lucila Las Heras
- Produced by: Ann Marie Flemming; Gabriela Avigliano; Lucila Las Heras; Matías A. Gamio
- Edited by: Alberto Ponce
- Music by: Pablo Borghi
- Release date: 2008
- Running time: 10 minutes
- Country: Argentina

The Portrait of the Pestilence (Spanish: El Retrato de la Peste) is a 2008 stop motion-animated short film written, directed and animated by Lucila Las Heras.

== Plot ==
Away in a tower, somewhere in Europe during the Middle Ages, Benjamin, a young painting apprentice, lives happily with his teacher, devoting his life to art. But the arrival of a mysterious plague threatens all they have.

== Awards ==
- 2008 - Mejor Cortometraje de Animación (Best Animation Short Film) 3er. Festival Pizza, Birra y Cortos (Gálvez, Santa Fé, Argentina)
- 2008 - Mejor Cortometraje de Animación (Best Animation Short Film) AV Al Extremo Cortos (Río Gallegos, Santa Cruz, Argentina)
- 2009 - Mejor Cortometraje (Best Short Film) II Festival Gualeguaychú Suma Cine (Gualeguaychú, Entre Ríos, Argentina)
