= A Midsummer Night's Dream (1959 film) =

1959 film

- Directed by: Jiří Trnka
- Screenplay by: Jiří Brdečka; Josef Kainar; Jiří Trnka
- Based on: A Midsummer Night's Dream; 1600 play by William Shakespeare
- Produced by: Erna Kmínková; Jaroslav Mozis
- Narrated by: Rudolf Pellar
- Cinematography: Jiří Vojta
- Edited by: Hana Walachová
- Distributed by: Ústřední půjčovna filmů
- Release date: 25 September 1959
- Running time: 76 minutes
- Country: Czechoslovakia
- Language: Czech

A Midsummer Night's Dream (Czech: Sen noci svatojánské) is a 1959 Czechoslovak animated puppet film directed by Jiří Trnka, his last feature length film before his death 10 years later in 1969. It is based on the Shakespeare play of the same name.

== Production ==
Trnka, operating under the Czech communist regime who had previously been denied in his wish to adapt Don Quixote, worked for a number of years on his adaptation of A Midsummer Night's Dream. The film established a new pinnacle of craftsmanship.

Beyond the artistic aspects the film was technically advanced. Trnka used expensive Eastmancolor stock. Every scene was shot with two cameras simultaneously—one shooting Academy ratio, and one shooting in the then new CinemaScope format, effectively producing an in-camera pan-and-scan version—all so Trnka could ensure that his widescreen production would not be presented letterboxed. The film thus exists in two definitive editions.

Garik Seko, a Georgian born animator from Zlin worked in the movie as an assistant. This is because the film cooperated with Czech animator Vlasta Jurajdova and co-existed with another work from Hermina Tyrlova namely Vlacek Kolejacek (The Little Train). They returned in 1976 for the short film, O mistru Hanusovi.

The score was composed by Václav Trojan.

== Reception and legacy ==
The film received an indifferent initial response, but was entered into the 1959 Cannes Film Festival where it tied for the Prix de la meilleure sélection (the selection of the Technical Committee) alongside Vojtěch Jasný's Desire (Czech: Touha). It also won an Honourable Medal at the 20th Venice International Film Festival in 1959; first prize for best film in Bucharest in 1960; second prize in Montevideo in 1960; and first prize—the "Golden Mercury"—for music in Valencia in 1962. Time magazine included the film in the Top 10 foreign movies of 1961.

Cerise Howard, discussing the film in a retrospective on Trnka for Senses of Cinema, describes the puppet animation as "more liquid, more balletic than ever"; the scenes between Nick Bottom and Titania are "achingly tender"; Titania's train is "an especially astonishing, luminous creation... constituted of tens of fairies, individually animated amidst reams of gorgeous, extensive coral garlanding". Overall the film is "distinguished by exquisite design throughout".

== English-language version ==
An English-language version was made with narration by Richard Burton and voice work by Alec McCowen.

=== Voice cast ===
- Hugh Manning as Theseus
- Laura Graham as Hippolyta
- Jack Gwillim as Oberon
- Barbara Jefford as Titania
- Roger Shepherd as Puck
- Alec McCowen as Nick Bottom
- Ann Bell as Hermia
- Barbara Leigh-Hunt as Helena
- Joss Ackland as Peter Quince
- Michael Meacham as Demetrius
- Stephen Moore as Francis Flute
- Tom Criddle as Lysander

== See also ==
- A Midsummer Night's Dream (1959 American TV play)

== Bibliography ==
- "Sen noci svatojánské". 1959 Cannes Film Festival. Festival de Cannes.
- "The Midsummer Night's Dream". Krátký Film Praha Catalogue.
- Raup, Jordan (20 March 2018). "The Puppet Master: The Complete Jiri Trnka, Starting April 20, Celebrates a Czech Animation Pioneer". FilmLinc Daily. Film Society of Lincoln Center.
- Rothwell, Kenneth S. (2000) [first published 1999]. A History of Shakespeare on Screen: A Century of Film and Television. Cambridge: Cambridge University Press. ISBN 0-521-59404-9.
