= The Czech Year =

1947 stop-motion-animated puppet feature film

- Directed by: Jiří Trnka
- Written by: Jiří Trnka
- Produced by: Krátký Film Praha; Jiří Trnka Studio
- Cinematography: Emanuel Franek; Vladimír Novotný
- Edited by: Helena Lebdusková
- Music by: Václav Trojan; Josef Zavadil (sound)
- Distributed by: Krátký Film Praha
- Release date: 13 December 1947 (Czechoslovakia)
- Running time: 75 minutes
- Country: Czechoslovakia
- Language: Czech

The Czech Year (Czech title: Špalíček), also called A Treasury of Fairy-Tales, is a 1947 stop-motion-animated puppet feature film from Czechoslovakia. It was the first feature film directed by Jiří Trnka, and it proceeded to win several international awards and make his name famous in the animation world.

== Plot ==
The traditional customs and tales of a Czech village are depicted in six separate sequences: "Shrovetide", "Spring", "Legend About St. Prokop", "The Fair", "The Feast" and "Bethlehem".

== Awards ==
- 1947—Venice (Italy): International Prize for Animated Picture
- 1948—Venice (Italy): Biennial Medal
- 1949—Paris (France): First Prize in Category

== See also ==
- List of animated feature films
- List of package films
- List of stop-motion films
- Špalíček (ballet), a ballet by Bohuslav Martinů
