= Old Czech Legends =

1953 film by Jiří Trnka

- Directed by: Jiří Trnka
- Screenplay by: Jiří Brdečka; Jiří Trnka
- Based on: Staré pověsti české by Alois Jirásek
- Cinematography: Emanuel Franek; Ludvík Hájek
- Edited by: Helena Lebdušková
- Music by: Václav Trojan
- Production companies: Československý státní film Praha; Loutkový film Praha
- Distributed by: Rozdělovna filmů Československého státního filmu
- Release date: 8 April 1953
- Running time: 91 minutes
- Country: Czechoslovakia
- Language: Czech

Old Czech Legends (Czech: Staré pověsti české) is a 1953 Czechoslovak stop motion puppet animation film directed by Jiří Trnka. It is based on the 1894 book Ancient Bohemian Legends by Alois Jirásek.

== Production ==
After the completion of Prince Bayaya in 1950, Trnka was praised by the communist regime of Czechoslovakia, and asked to make more films. He planned to make an adaptation of Don Quixote, but was rejected for the theme being too cosmopolitan. He was pressed to make an adaptation of Jirásek's Ancient Bohemian Legends. Trnka initially didn't want to work on the project.

The film has a complex story with many characters and features complicated scenes both to stage and animate. Trnka's use of camera movements, lighting, set design, character design and animation and general storytelling made this an influential film in the history of animation.

== Voice cast ==
- Růžena Nasková
- Zdeněk Štěpánek
- Eduard Kohout
- Václav Vydra
- Karel Höger
