= The Good Soldier Schweik (1954 film) =

1955 Czechoslovak animated film directed by Jiří Trnka

The Good Soldier Schweik (Czech: Dobrý voják Svejk) is a 1954 Czechoslovak animated film directed by Jiří Trnka based on the novel The Good Soldier Švejk by Jaroslav Hašek. Its length is 76 minutes and consists of three episodes, From Hatvan to Halič, Švejk train accidents and Švejk Budějovice anabasi. Narrator: Jan Werich.
