= Prince Bayaya =

- Directed by: Jiří Trnka
- Screenplay by: Jirí Trnka
- Based on: Princ Bajaja by Božena Němcová
- Produced by: Ceskoslovenský Státní Film
- Starring: Jana Kuhna
- Cinematography: Emanuel Franek; Ludvík Hájek
- Edited by: Helena Lebdusková
- Music by: Václav Trojan
- Distributed by: Procinex; Státní Pujcovna Filmu
- Release date: 11 October 1950
- Running time: 87 minutes
- Country: Czechoslovakia
- Language: Czech

Prince Bayaya (Czech: Bajaja) is a 1950 Czechoslovak animated film directed by Jiří Trnka.

== Plot ==
Poor half-orphan Bayaya is attracted by a call one day. He is called by his deceased mother who is experiencing her purgatory transformed into a white horse. She convinces Baya to go on a journey with her. Next steps lead them to a kingdom where three princesses are waiting to be sacrificed to dragons. Bayaya defeats all three dragons and chooses his future wife among the princesses. But at his mother's request, he must not reveal that he is the hero who saved the princesses. However, after a series of further disappointments, he gets a well-deserved happy ending.

== Animation ==
- Břetislav Pojar - Bayaya
- Jan Karpaš - Princesses
- Bohuslav Šrámek - Grooms and Knights
- Zdeněk Hrabě - King
- Stanislav Látal - Jester
- František Braun - Armorers

== Awards ==
1954 Locarno International Film Festival

- Won: Golden Leopard
