= The Emperor's Nightingale =

1949 Czechoslovak stop-motion animated film

- Directed by: Jiří Trnka; Miloš Makovec
- Written by: Vítězslav Nezval; Hans Christian Andersen; Jiří Brdečka; Jiří Trnka
- Starring: Helena Patockova; Jaromir Sobotoa; Detsky pevecky sbor Jana Kuhna
- Cinematography: Ferdinand Pecenka
- Edited by: Helena Lebdusková; Jiří Trnka
- Music by: Václav Trojan
- Release date: 15 April 1949
- Running time: 72 minutes
- Country: Czechoslovakia
- Language: Czech

The Emperor's Nightingale (Czech: Císařův slavík) is a 1949 Czechoslovak stop-motion animated film directed by Jiří Trnka and Miloš Makovec. The film is based on the 1843 fairy tale "The Nightingale" by Hans Christian Andersen. Boris Karloff provides the voice of the narrator in the 1951 American dubbed version. The film won the Golden Leopard at the Locarno International Film Festival.

In the film, a live-action boy dreams that his toys are real. The toys come to life in stop-motion animation, and tell the story of a Chinese emperor who makes friends with a nightingale.

== Cast ==
- Helena Patočková as the girl
- Jaromír Sobota as the boy
- Dětský pěvecký sbor Jana Kuhna as chorus
- Boris Karloff - Narrator in English language version only

== See also ==
- Boris Karloff filmography
- List of Czech films
- Jiří Trnka
