= 1910 in animation =

Events in 1910 in animation.

== Films released ==
- Unknown date – The Clown and His Donkey (United Kingdom)

== Births ==
=== January ===
- January 16: Aurelius Battaglia, American illustrator (Walt Disney Studios, United Productions of America), (d. 1984).
- January 19: Izzy Ellis, American animator (Warner Bros. Cartoons, Paramount Cartoon Studios, Hanna-Barbera), (d. 1994).
- January 23: Walter Greene, American composer (Walter Lantz Productions, DePatie-Freleng Enterprises), (d. 1983).
- January 31: Jack Mercer, American voice actor, animator and script writer (Fleischer Studios, Paramount Pictures, voice of Popeye and Felix the Cat), (d. 1984).

=== February ===
- February 10: Reuben Timmins, American animator and comics artist (Fleischer Studios, Van Beuren Studios, Terrytoons, Walt Disney Company, Hanna-Barbera, Tom & Jerry, Crusader Rabbit, Peanuts, Fat Albert and the Cosby Kids), (d. 1994).

=== March ===
- March 10:
  - David Rose, American animator, art director, illustrator and designer (Walt Disney Animation Studios, Warner Bros. Animation), (d. 2006).
  - Little Ann Little, American singer and actress (continued voice of Betty Boop), (d. 1981).
- March 15: Nick Stewart, American actor (voice of Specks Crow in Dumbo and Br'er Bear in Song of the South), (d. 2000).
- March 17: Frank de Kova, American actor (voice of Angie in Heavy Traffic, Managan in Coonskin and Old Vinnie in Hey Good Lookin'), (d. 1981).
- March 19: John McGrew, American animator, layout artist, musician, and painter (Warner Bros. Cartoons), (d. 1999).
- March 23: Paula Winslowe, American actress (voice of Bambi's mother in Bambi), (d. 1996).
- March 26: Rudy Zamora, American animator and animation director (Jay Ward Productions, Hanna-Barbera), (d. 1989).

=== April ===
- April 5: Ferdinand Bis, A.K.A. Ferdo Bis, Croatian comics artist and animator, (d. 1980).

=== May ===
- May 5: Bill Baucom, American actor (voice of Trusty in Lady and the Tramp), (d. 1981).
- May 11: Gordon A. Sheehan, American animator and cartoonist (Betty Boop, Popeye, Superman), (d. 1996).
- May 23: Scatman Crothers, American voice actor (voice of Scat Cat in The Aristocats, Meadowlark Lemon in Harlem Globetrotters, Hong Kong Phooey in Hong Kong Phooey, Old Man Bone in Coonskin, Jazz in The Transformers), (d. 1986).
- May 24: Ed Love, American animator (Walt Disney Company, MGM (worked in Tex Avery's unit), Walter Lantz, Hanna-Barbera), (d. 1996).

=== June ===
- June 5: Herb Vigran, American actor (voice of narrator in What's My Lion?, Glum in The Adventures of Gulliver, Lurvy in Charlotte's Web, Museum Man in The Super Globetrotters episode "The Super Globetrotters vs. Museum Man", Mr. Dinkle in Shirt Tales, Hopps in Starchaser: The Legend of Orin, additional voices in The Plastic Man Comedy/Adventure Show and Saturday Supercade), (d. 1986).
- June 13: Mary Wickes, American actress (live-action model for Cruella De Vil in 101 Dalmatians, voice of Laverne in The Hunchback of Notre Dame), (d. 1995).
- June 16: Judd Conlon, American vocal arranger and conductor (Alice in Wonderland, Peter Pan), (d. 1966).
- June 28: Herbert Ryman, American artist (Walt Disney Animation Studios), (d. 1989).

=== July ===
- July 3: Marcellite Garner, American voice actress (voiced Minnie Mouse in several cartoons), (d. 1993).
- July 14: William Hanna, American animator, cartoonist, and musician (creator and voice actor of Tom and Jerry, co-founder of Hanna-Barbera), (d. 2001).
- July 22: Ruthie Tompson, American camera technician and animation checker (Walt Disney Animation Studios), (d. 2021).
- July 26: Kenneth Muse, American animator (Walt Disney Company, MGM, Hanna-Barbera), (d. 1987).

=== August ===
- August 28: Chase Craig, American animator and cartoonist (Leon Schlesinger Productions, Walter Lantz Productions), (d. 2001).
- August 29: Ed Barge, American animator (Harman-Ising, MGM, Hanna-Barbera, Ralph Bakshi), (d. 1991).

=== September ===
- September 3: Yale Gracey, Writer and layout artist, (Walt Disney Animation Studios), (d. 1983).
- September 5: Kenny Delmar, American actor (voice of Commander McBragg, The Hunter in King Leonardo and His Short Subjects, character of Senator Claghorn, inspiration for Foghorn Leghorn), (d. 1984).
- September 11: John Sutherland, American animator (Walt Disney Company), voice actor (voice of young adult Bambi in Bambi) and film producer (Daffy Ditties), (d. 2001).
- September 14: Peter Strausfeld, British animator and illustrator (Peak Load Electricity, Salvage Saves Shipping, Skeleton in the Cupboard), (d. 1980).
- September 15: Charles August Nichols, American animator and film director (Toot, Whistle, Plunk and Boom, Charlotte's Web), (d. 1992).
- September 19: Jack Dunham, American animator and television producer (Walt Disney Animation Studios, Walter Lantz Productions), (d. 2008).

=== October ===
- October 8: Winston Hibler, American screenwriter and film producer (Walt Disney Company), (d. 1976).
- October 10:
  - Rod Scribner, American animator (Warner Bros. Cartoons, Peanuts specials) and producer (Playhouse Pictures), (d. 1976).
  - Steve Muffati, American animator and comics artist (Fleischer Studios, Famous Studios), (d. 1968).
- October 13: Bob McKimson, American animator, director and illustrator (Looney Tunes, Foghorn Leghorn, Tasmanian Devil), (d. 1977).
- October 25:
  - David Lichine, Russian-American ballet dancer and choreographer (Fantasia, Make Mine Music), (d. 1972).
  - Tyrus Wong, Chinese-American painter, calligrapher, muralist, ceramicist, lithographer, kite designer, set designer, storyboard artist and animator (Walt Disney Company), (d. 2016).

=== November ===
- November 3: Karel Zeman, Czech film director and animator (A Christmas Dream, Mr. Prokouk), (d. 1989).
- November 6: Elmer Plummer, American animator and watercolorist (Walt Disney Animation Studios, Warner Bros. Cartoons), (d. 1986).
- November 26: James Simpkins, Canadian animator and comics artist (National Film Board of Canada), (d. 2004).

=== December ===
- December 7: Louis Prima, American jazz musician and actor (voice of King Louie in The Jungle Book), (d. 1978).
- December 14: George Nicholas, American animator (Walt Disney Animation Studios, Hanna-Barbera), (d. 1996).
- December 20: Carl Urbano, American animator and director (A Is for Atom), (d. 2003).

=== Specific date unknown ===
- Lonesome George, Spanish Pinta Island tortoise (inspiration for the Lonesome Hubert segment in the Futurama episode "Naturama"), (d. 2012).
- Salvador Mestres, Spanish animator, film director and comics artist (Hispano Grafic Films), (d. 1975).

== Sources ==
- Bendazzi, Giannalberto (2017), "The Individualists", Animation: A World History: Volume I: Foundations, Routledge, ISBN 978-1138035317
- McKimson Jr., Robert (2012). "I Say, I Say ... Son!": A Tribute to Legendary Animators Bob, Chuck, and Tom McKimson. Santa Monica Press. ISBN 978-1-59580-069-5.
