= 1953 in animation =

Events in 1953 in animation.

== Events ==
=== January ===
- January 3: Chuck Jones's Don't Give Up the Sheep premieres, produced by Warner Bros. Cartoons, which marks the debuts of Ralph Wolf and Sam Sheepdog.
- January 10: Hanna-Barbera's Tom and Jerry cartoon The Missing Mouse premieres, produced by MGM's Cartoon Studio. This was Hanna & Barbera's only short in the series that wasn't scored by Scott Bradley due to him being on vacation at the time, the short was instead scored by Edward Plumb.
- January 17: Friz Freleng's Tweety and Sylvester cartoon Snow Business premieres, produced by Warner Bros. Cartoons. Also starring Granny.
- January 31: Friz Freleng's Sylvester cartoon A Mouse Divided premieres, produced by Warner Bros. Cartoons.

=== February ===
- February 5: Clyde Geronimi, Wilfred Jackson and Hamilton Luske's Peter Pan, produced by the Walt Disney Company, is first released. It marks the debut of Disney's version of Tinker Bell, who will later become one of their mascots.
- February 14: Chuck Jones' Bugs Bunny cartoon Forward March Hare premieres, produced by Warner Bros. Cartoons.
- February 17: Hanna-Barbera's Tom and Jerry cartoon Johann Mouse premieres, produced by MGM's Cartoon Studio.
- February 21:
  - Hanna-Barbera's Tom and Jerry cartoon Jerry and Jumbo premieres, produced by MGM's Cartoon Studio.
  - Chuck Jones' cartoon Kiss Me Cat premieres, produced by Warner Bros. Cartoons. Starring Marc Antony and Pussyfoot.
- February 28: Chuck Jones' iconic Daffy Duck cartoon Duck Amuck premieres, produced by Warner Bros. Cartoons. Bugs Bunny makes an appearance at the end of the short.

=== March ===
- March 14: Robert McKimson's Bugs Bunny and Elmer Fudd cartoon Upswept Hare premieres, produced by Warner Bros. Cartoons.
- March 19: 25th Academy Awards: Johann Mouse wins the Academy Award for Best Animated Short. It is the seventh and final Tom and Jerry cartoon to win an Oscar.
- March 27: Karel Zeman's first animated feature Poklad ptačího ostrova (The Treasure of Bird Island) premieres.
- March 28: Robert McKimson's cartoon A Peck o' Trouble premieres, produced by Warner Bros. Cartoons. Starring Dodsworth the cat.

=== April ===
- April 4: Friz Freleng's Tweety and Sylvester cartoon Fowl Weather premieres, produced by Warner Bros. Cartoons. Also starring Granny and Hector the Bulldog.
- April 8: Jiří Trnka's Old Czech Legends premieres.
- April 15–29: 1953 Cannes Film Festival:
  - Walt Disney receives a Legion of Honour during the opening ceremony.
  - The Romance of Transportation in Canada by Colin Low wins the Short Film Palme d'Or.
- April 18: Tex Avery's Little Johnny Jet premieres, produced by MGM's Cartoon Studio. This was Avery's first cartoon to be released after returning from his year-long Sabbatical vacation.
- April 25: Hanna-Barbera's Tom and Jerry short That's My Pup! premieres, produced by MGM's Cartoon Studio and also starring Spike and Tyke.

=== May ===
- May 2: Friz Freleng's Bugs Bunny and Yosemite Sam cartoon Southern Fried Rabbit premieres, produced by Warner Bros. Cartoons.

=== June ===
- June 6: Tex Avery's T.V. of Tomorrow premieres, produced by MGM's Cartoon Studio.
- June 19: Warner Bros. Cartoons is shut down due to a heavy backlog of releases until the following year and fearing that 3D cartoon production would be too expensive.
- June 20: Friz Freleng's Bugs Bunny and Yosemite Sam cartoon Hare Trimmed premieres, produced by Warner Bros. Cartoons. Also starring Granny.
- June 27: Friz Freleng's Tweety and Sylvester cartoon Tom Tom Tomcat premieres, produced by Warner Bros. Cartoons. Also starring Granny. This short has rarely been aired on TV or re-released on home media due to its offensive stereotypes towards Native Americans.

=== July ===
- July 2: Carl Urbano's animated documentary film A Is for Atom received a theatrical release, opening at the Pantages and Hillstreet Theatres in Los Angeles on July 2, 1953. The distributor was Al O. Bondy, who made the short available for free. The short documentary, which is now in the public domain, explains what an atom is, how nuclear energy is released from certain kinds of atoms, the peacetime uses of nuclear power, and the by-products of nuclear fission. The film is Sutherland's most-decorated film of the film producer John Sutherland, having won numerous honors at film festivals.
- July 11: Chuck Jones' Pepé Le Pew cartoon Wild Over You premieres, produced by Warner Bros. Cartoons.
- July 25: Chuck Jones' iconic cartoon Duck Dodgers in the 24½th Century premieres; starring Daffy Duck, Porky Pig, & Marvin the Martian; produced by Warner Bros. Cartoons.

=== August ===
- August 8: Chuck Jones' iconic cartoon Bully for Bugs premieres, produced by Warner Bros. Cartoons. In the film, Bugs Bunny becomes a bullfighter.
- August 22: Robert McKimson's cartoon Plop Goes the Weasel premieres, produced Warner Bros. Cartoons, starring Foghorn Leghorn and Barnyard Dawg.
- August 29: Robert McKimson's Cat-Tails For Two is first released, produced by Warner Bros. Cartoons. It marks the prototype debut of Speedy Gonzales, the character's final design would be introduced 2 years later.

=== September ===
- September 5:
  - Friz Freleng's Tweety and Sylvester cartoon A Street Cat Named Sylvester premieres, produced by Warner Bros. Cartoons. Also starring Granny and Hector the Bulldog.
  - Hanna-Barbera's Tom and Jerry cartoon Just Ducky premieres, produced by MGM's Cartoon Studio and also starring Quacker.
- September 10: Chuck Jones' Wile E. Coyote and Road Runner short Zipping Along premieres, produced by Warner Bros. Cartoons.
- September 11: Jiří Trnka's Old Czech Legends premieres.
- September 23: The Unicorn in the Garden premieres, a United Productions of America production.
- September 25: Chuck Jones' Bugs Bunny short Lumber Jack-Rabbit premieres, produced by Warner Bros. Cartoons, a cartoon made in 3D.

=== October ===
- October 3: Chuck Jones' cartoon Duck! Rabbit, Duck! premieres, produced by Warner Bros. Cartoons, the third & final short in the "hunting season" trilogy starring Bugs Bunny, Daffy Duck and Elmer Fudd.
- October 10: Winky Dink and You, the first interactive television series which invites viewers to use a special crayon to draw on the screen, is first broadcast.
- October 17: Hanna-Barbera's Tom and Jerry cartoon Two Little Indians premieres, produced by MGM's Cartoon Studio which has Jerry taking two orphan mice (who both resemble Nibbles) dressed like Native-Americans on a hiking trip, but the orphan mice's antics get them all in trouble with Tom. Spike makes a cameo in this short.
- October 28: Hanna-Barbera's Tom and Jerrycartoon Life with Tompremieres, produced by MGM's Cartoon Studio. The short features footage from the previous Tom and Jerry cartoons: Cat Fishin', The Little Orphan, & Kitty Foiled.
- October 30: Jean Image's Bonjour Paris premieres.
- October 31: Friz Freleng's Tweety and Sylvester cartoon Catty Cornered premieres, produced by Warner Bros. Cartoons. Also starring Rocky the gangster.

=== November ===
- November 10:
  - Hamilton Luske's Ben and Me, produced by the Walt Disney Company, is first released, a cartoon about Benjamin Franklin. It was adapted from the book of the same name written by the author and illustrator Robert Lawson and first published in 1939. Though both book and film deal with the relationship between a mouse and American Founding Father Benjamin Franklin, the book, with illustrations by Lawson, focused more heavily on actual historical events and personages, and included incidents from Franklin's French career at Versailles. This short was also notable for being the second release on the Buena Vista Distribution label, with the first being Toot, Whistle, Plunk and Boom, released on the same day. On its release, Ben and Me was packaged with the feature-length True-Life Adventures nature documentary film The Living Desert. When Disney's regular distributor RKO Radio Pictures resisted Disney's idea of releasing a feature-length True-Life Adventures nature documentary film, Disney formed his own distribution company to handle future Disney releases.
  - Ward Kimball and Charles A. Nichols' Toot, Whistle, Plunk and Boom, produced by the Walt Disney Company, premieres. It is the first Disney cartoon to be filmed and released in widescreen Cinemascope.Toot, Whistle, Plunk and Boom won the 1954 Oscar for Best Short Subject (Cartoons).
- November 14: Robert McKimson's cartoon Of Rice and Hen premieres, produced Warner Bros. Cartoons. Starring Foghorn Leghorn, Miss Prissy, and Barnyard Dawg.
- November 28: Robert McKimson's Sylvester and Hippety Hopper cartoon Cats A-Weigh! premieres, produced Warner Bros. Cartoons. Also starring Sylvester Jr.

=== December ===
- December 12: Friz Freleng's Bugs Bunny and Elmer Fudd cartoon Robot Rabbit premieres, produced by Warner Bros. Cartoons.
- December 17: Ted Parmelee's The Tell-Tale Heart, produced by UPA, premieres. The film was the first cartoon to be rated X, indicating it was suitable only for adult audiences, by the British Board of Film Censors. It was nominated for the Academy Award for Best Animated Short Film but lost to Toot, Whistle, Plunk and Boom from Walt Disney Productions.
- December 19: Chuck Jones's Punch Trunk premieres, produced by Warner Bros. Cartoons.
- December 21: Walter Lantz productions releases Chilly Willy, directed by Paul J. Smith which marks the debut of Chilly Willy the penguin.
- December 26: Tex Avery's Droopy cartoon The Three Little Pups premieres, produced by MGM's Cartoon Studio. This short marks the debut of the character Dixie Wolf.

== Films released ==
- February 5 - Peter Pan (United States)
- March 27 - The Treasure of Bird Island (Czechoslovakia)
- April 8 - Old Czech Legends (Czechoslovakia)
- October 30 - Bonjour Paris (France)
- Unknown - Amazon Symphony (Brazil)

== Television series ==
- October 10 - Winky Dink and You debuts on CBS.

== Births ==
=== January ===
- January 14: Bonita Pietila, American casting director and producer (The Simpsons).
- January 17: Mark Jones, American director, screenwriter (Super Friends, Saturday Supercade, Skysurfer Strike Force, Mister T, Heathcliff, Wild West C.O.W.-Boys of Moo Mesa, Captain Caveman and the Teen Angels, James Bond Jr., Rubik, the Amazing Cube, The Puppy's Further Adventures) and producer (Rubik, the Amazing Cube, The Puppy's Further Adventures), (d. 2026).
- January 20: Kent Butterworth, American animator (Filmation, Hanna-Barbera, An American Tail, Mighty Mouse: The New Adventures, This Is America, Charlie Brown, Denver, the Last Dinosaur, Christmas in Tattertown, Tiny Toon Adventures), storyboard artist (G.I. Joe: A Real American Hero, DIC Entertainment, The Flintstone Kids, The Smurfs, Visionaries: Knights of the Magical Light, Spiral Zone, Mighty Mouse: The New Adventures, Robotech II: The Sentinels, The Butter Battle Book, The Simpsons, Mr. Bogus, Twinkle, the Dream Being, Superbook), lip sync artist (Danger & Eggs, Mortal Kombat Legends: Scorpion's Revenge), sheet timer (DIC Entertainment, Warner Bros. Animation, The Ren & Stimpy Show, Mighty Max, Dino Babies, Adventures from the Book of Virtues, FernGully 2: The Magical Rescue, Sitting Ducks, Chicago Party Aunt), writer (Spiral Zone), producer (DIC Entertainment, Saban Entertainment) and director (Filmation, Marvel Productions, Fred Wolf Films, Mighty Mouse: The New Adventures, DIC Entertainment, The Butter Battle Book, The Simpsons, Tiny Toon Adventures, Shelley Duvall's Bedtime Stories, Batman: The Animated Series, The Mouse and the Monster, The Zula Patrol).
- January 23: Robin Zander, American musician and member of Cheap Trick (singing voice of Omar in Rock & Rule).
- January 24: Matthew Wilder, American musician (singing voice of Ling in Mulan).
- January 29: Paul Fusco, American puppeteer, actor, television producer, writer and director (voice of ALF in ALF: The Animated Series, ALF Tales, Cartoon All-Stars to the Rescue, the Duncanville episode "Sister, Wife", and The Simpsons episode "The Many Saints of Springfield", creator and voice of Captain Catgut in Space Cats).
- January 30: Patricia Alice Albrecht, American actress, writer and poet (voice of Phyllis "Pizzazz" Gabor in Jem), (d. 2019).

=== February ===
- February 4: H. Lee Peterson, American editor (Aladdin, Monsters University, Pocahontas, Dinosaur, Madagascar franchise, Home on the Range, The Little Mermaid), (d. 2026).
- February 8: Mary Steenburgen, American actress (voice of Crystalynn Poole in Bless the Harts, Clara Brown in Back to the Future, Athena in the Robot Chicken episode "The Core, the Thief, His Wife, and Her Lover").
- February 9:
  - Ciarán Hinds, Irish actor (voice of Grand Pabbie in the Frozen franchise, Botticelli Remorso in The Tale of Despereaux).
  - Liz Holzman, American animator (Alvin and the Chipmunks), storyboard artist (Marvel Productions, Disney Television Animation, Animated Stories from the Bible, Garfield and Friends, Curious George), character designer (Disney Television Animation), prop designer (TaleSpin), art director, writer, director and producer (Warner Bros. Animation), (d. 2014).
- February 21: Christine Ebersole, American actress and singer (voice of White Diamond in the Steven Universe franchise).
- February 26: Michael Bolton, American singer and songwriter (voice of Tiger in Teen Titans Go! To the Movies).

=== March ===
- March 4: Kay Lenz, American actress (voice of American Maid in The Tick, Cowlamity Kate Cudster in Wild West C.O.W.-Boys of Moo Mesa).
- March 15: Frances Conroy, American actress (voice of Angie Dinkley in Scooby-Doo! Mystery Incorporated, Antoinette in The Tale of Despereaux, Martha Kent in All-Star Superman and Superman: Unbound, The Director in Nimona).
- March 16:
  - Micheline Charest, British-born Canadian television producer (co-founder of CINAR), (d. 2004).
  - Debby Hindman, American production manager and producer (Hanna-Barbera, Nickelodeon Animation Studio, Family Guy).
- March 23: Chaka Khan, American singer, songwriter and musician (voice of Marla in Globehunters: An Around the World in 80 Days Adventure, herself in the Phineas and Ferb episode "Phineas and Ferb: Summer Belongs To You!").
- March 24:
  - Louie Anderson, American actor, comedian, author and game show host (voice of Security Guard #1 in Bebe's Kids, Gory Agnes in Pickle and Peanut, Chester in Tig n' Seek, Burt in The Grim Adventures of Billy & Mandy episode "Fear and Loathing in Endsville", Mining Team of Louie Andersons in the Tom Goes to the Mayor episode "White Collarless", himself in the No Activity episode "40 Days & 40 Nights", creator, producer and voice of Andy Anderson and Little Louie in Life with Louie), (d. 2022).
  - Heiki Ernits, Estonian animator, illustrator, and film director.
- March 27: John Saint Ryan, English actor (voice of King Arthur in Gargoyles), (d. 2025).
- March 30: Jeff Cesario, American actor, comedian, producer and writer (voice of Dr. Weatherfield in the Life with Louie episode "Pains, Grains, and Allergy Shots", Marv Albert's Head in the Futurama episode "Time Keeps On Slippin'").

=== April ===
- April 5: Keiko Han, Japanese actress (voice of Queen Beryl and Luna in the Japanese dub of Sailor Moon).
- April 11: Sizzle Ohtaka, Japanese singer (performed an insert song in .hack//Legend of the Twilight and the theme songs for Hotarubi no Mori e and I'm Gonna Be An Angel!), (d. 2022).
- April 13: Ricardo Schnetzer, Brazilian voice actor (Brazilian dub voice of Ares and Hades in Justice League Unlimited, Lancelot in Shrek the Third, Spider-Man Noir in Spider-Man: Into the Spider-Verse, Master Monkey in Kung Fu Panda, Captain Planet in Captain Planet and the Planeteers, Deathstroke in Teen Titans Go! To the Movies, Teen Titans, Justice League: The Flashpoint Paradox, Son of Batman and Teen Titans: The Judas Contract, Benson Dunwoody in Regular Show, Hank in Dungeons & Dragons), (d. 2026).
- April 15: Larry Latham, American storyboard director, animator, film producer and film director (Hanna-Barbera, Disney Television Animation), (d. 2014).
- April 18: Rick Moranis, Canadian actor, comedian, musician, songwriter, writer, and producer (voice of Rutt in Brother Bear and Brother Bear 2, Max Schneider in Gravedale High, the Toy Taker and Mr. Cuddles in Rudolph the Red-Nosed Reindeer and the Island of Misfit Toys, co-creator and executive producer of Bob & Doug).
- April 25:
  - Ron Clements, American animator, screenwriter, film director, and producer (Walt Disney Animation Studios).
  - Jeffrey Leigh Howard, American animator (Walt Disney Animation Studios, An American Tail, BraveStarr, Happily Ever After, All Dogs Go to Heaven, Rover Dangerfield, Film Roman, Once Upon a Forest, The Pagemaster, Universal Cartoon Studios, Hyperion Pictures, The Swan Princess: Escape from Castle Mountain, The Swan Princess: The Mystery of the Enchanted Treasure, DreamWorks Animation, Disney Television Animation, The Powerpuff Girls Movie, Dora the Explorer, DisneyToon Studios, Curious George, The Smurfs: The Legend of Smurfy Hollow, Henry & Me), storyboard artist (Kid 'n Play), prop designer (Darkwing Duck) and sheet timer (Dora the Explorer, The Simpsons, King of the Hill), (d. 2022).
- April 27: Linda Young, American actress (voice of Frieza in Dragon Ball Z, Genkai in YuYu Hakusho).
- April 28: Kim Gordon, American musician and member of Sonic Youth (voice of Tulip in the Animals episode "Rats.", herself in The Simpsons episode "Homerpalooza").

=== May ===
- May 9: Amy Hill, American actress and stand-up comedian (voice of Mrs. Hasagawa in the Lilo & Stitch franchise, Mama Tohru in Jackie Chan Adventures, Jasmine Lee in The Life and Times of Juniper Lee, Mah Mah Ling in American Dad!, Su, Mrs. Gow, Fangbing, Grandma Panda and Pei-Pei in the Kung Fu Panda franchise, Susan Choi in Spider-Man, Professor Sitre in Cleopatra in Space, Aunt Cathy in the American Dragon: Jake Long episode "Feeding Frenzy", Mrs. Sato in the Big City Greens episode "Rent Control", K3NT in the Legion of Super Heroes episode "The Man from the Edge of Tomorrow").
- May 12: Lisa Raggio, American actress (voice of Zarana in G.I. Joe, Exposia Vertov in Aaahh!!! Real Monsters, Eclair in The Tick episode "Tick vs. Europe").
- May 16:
  - Pierce Brosnan, Irish actor and film producer (voice of King Arthur in Quest for Camelot, the Narrator in Thomas & Friends: The Great Discovery, Patrick and Granddad in Riverdance: The Animated Adventure, himself in The Simpsons episode "Treehouse of Horror XII").
  - Peter Onorati, American actor (voice of Warhawk in the DC Animated Universe, Draco in Batman vs. Robin, B'wana Beast in the Justice League Unlimited episode "This Little Piggy", Pava in The Wild Thornberrys episode "Pack of Thornberrys", Robotman in the Teen Titans episode "Homecoming", Joe Chill in the Batman: The Brave and the Bold episode "Chill of the Night!").
- May 18: Alan Kupperberg, American comics artist and animator (Don Bluth), (d. 2015).
- May 24: Alfred Molina, English actor (voice of Ares in Wonder Woman, Roadkill in Rango, Multi-Bear in Gravity Falls, Fairy King in Strange Magic, Double Dan in Ralph Breaks the Internet, King Agnarr in Frozen II, Lasombra in Hey Arnold!: The Jungle Movie, Rippen in Penn Zero: Part-Time Hero, Mr. Freeze in Harley Quinn, Cogburn in Big City Greens, Professor Jeffries in Chill Out, Scooby-Doo!, Francis Church in Yes, Virginia, Lucius Needful in the Rick and Morty episode "Something Ricked This Way Comes").
- May 27:
  - Louis Scarborough Jr., American animator and storyboard artist (Teenage Mutant Ninja Turtles, Adventures of Sonic the Hedgehog, ChalkZone), (d. 2013).
  - George Chialtas, American animator (Rover Dangerfield, Tom and Jerry: The Movie, The Pagemaster), storyboard artist (Hey Arnold!), sheet timer (The Simpsons, Nickelodeon Animation Studio, Megas XLR, He's a Bully, Charlie Brown, Billy Dilley's Super-Duper Subterranean Summer, Trolls: The Beat Goes On!), lip sync artist (Avatar: The Last Airbender, Dora the Explorer, She-Ra and the Princesses of Power) and director (Nickelodeon Animation Studio).
- May 29:
  - Danny Elfman, American composer, singer and songwriter (The Nightmare Before Christmas, Corpse Bride, Meet the Robinsons, Frankenweenie, Epic, Mr. Peabody & Sherman, The Grinch, Dumbo, composed the theme songs of The Simpsons, Beetlejuice, Batman: The Animated Series, Family Dog and Dilbert), and actor (singing voice of Jack Skellington and voice of Barrel in The Nightmare Before Christmas, Bonejangles in Corpse Bride).
  - Karla DeVito, American singer and actress (voice of Miranda Wright in Bonkers, Lady Megan, Elizabeth and Princess Sadisa in The Legend of Prince Valiant, Athena in the Phantom 2040 episode "A Boy and His Cat", Cassidy in The New Batman Adventures episode "Torch Song", Woman Soldier in the Road Rovers episode "Storm from the Pacific").
- May 30: Colm Meaney, Irish actor (voice of Myles Standish in Free Birds, Tom O'Flanagan in The Simpsons episode "In the Name of the Grandfather", Mr. Dugan in the Gargoyles episode "The Hound of Ulster").

=== June ===
- June 1: Tim Bentinck, English actor and writer (voice of Roger Radcliffe in 101 Dalmatians II: Patch's London Adventure, Conjoined Gnome in Gnomeo & Juliet, Gieve in The Heroic Legend of Arslan).
- June 5: Kathleen Kennedy, American film producer (Who Framed Roger Rabbit, The Land Before Time, Tiny Toon Adventures, A Wish for Wings That Work, Fievel's American Tails, The Adventures of Tintin).
- June 12: Michael Donovan, Canadian voice actor (voice of Eggplant Wizard in Captain N: The Game Master, Sir Darren in King Arthur and the Knights of Justice, Sabretooth in X-Men: Evolution, X in Mega Man, El Rey in ¡Mucha Lucha!, Guile and Zangief in Street Fighter, Dojo Kanojo Cho in Xiaolin Chronicles, Zoukien Mato in Fate/Zero, Suikotsu in Inuyasha, Ryoga Hibiki in Ranma ½), (d. 2026).
- June 13: Tim Allen, American actor and comedian (voice of Buzz Lightyear in the Toy Story franchise).
- June 17: John H. Williams, American film producer (Shrek, Vanguard Animation).
- June 22: Cyndi Lauper, American musician and actress (voice of Pidge in the Happily Ever After: Fairy Tales for Every Child episode "The Frog Prince", herself in The Simpsons episode "Wild Barts Can't Be Broken" and The Backyardigans episode "International Super Spy").
- June 26: Robert Davi, American actor (voice of Mike Morgan / Magma in the Batman Beyond episode "Heroes").
- June 27: Nizo Yamamoto, Japanese art director (Studio Ghibli, The Castle of Cagliostro, Joseph: King of Dreams, Highlander: The Search for Vengeance, Little Nemo: Adventures in Slumberland, The Girl Who Leapt Through Time), (d. 2023).

=== July ===
- July 11: Mindy Sterling, American actress (voice of Lin Beifong in The Legend of Korra, Ms. Endive in Chowder, Aunt Mellie in Higglytown Heroes, Mrs. Sneedly in The Epic Tales of Captain Underpants, Enid Clinton in the Justice League Unlimited episode "The Once and Future Thing").
- July 15: Michaël Dudok de Wit, Dutch animator, director and illustrator (Father and Daughter, The Monk and the Fish, The Red Turtle).
- July 16: Philece Sampler, American actress (voice of Mimi Tachikawa in the Digimon franchise, Betty Ross in The Incredible Hulk, Kelly in Transformers: Robots in Disguise, Binka in Shinzo, Makimachi Misao in Rurouni Kenshin, Lester Goldberg in Stanley, Silvia in Viewtiful Joe, Beauty in Bobobo-bo Bo-bobo, Jimera in Duel Masters, Hiyori Tamura in Lucky Star, Toph Beifong in The Legend of Korra, Sabine Cheng and Ms. Mendeleiev in Miraculous: Tales of Ladybug & Cat Noir, Granny and Mother Goose in Goldie & Bear, Rumy, Hermit Crab and Sea Turtle in Treehouse Detectives, Fantine and Cosette in the Duckman episode "Psyche", Francine in the All Grown Up! episode "Fools Rush In", Mildred Scalise in The Loud House episode "Recipe for Disaster"), (d. 2021).
- July 29: Tim Gunn, American author, academic, and television personality (voice of Baileywick in Sofia the First, Wren in Middle School Moguls, Robbie Roberts in Mickey Mouse Mixed-Up Adventures, Pageant Organizer in the Animaniacs episode "Mouse Congeniality", Sewing Machine in the Bob's Burgers episode "Gift Card or Buy Trying", himself in the Family Guy episode "Save the Clam", the American Dad! episode "Escape from Pearl Bailey", The Cleveland Show episode "Turkey Pot Die", the BoJack Horseman episode "Hooray! Todd Episode!", Zoolander: Super Model, and the Scooby-Doo and Guess Who? episode "A Fashion Nightmare!").
- July 31: Tōru Furuya, Japanese actor (voice of Yamcha in the Dragon Ball franchise, Sabo in One Piece, Tuxedo Mask in Sailor Moon, Amuro Ray in the Gundam franchise).

=== August ===
- August 1: Mark Dailey, American-born Canadian actor, television journalist and announcer (voice of Crag in The Ripping Friends, Rokusho, Roks and Eddie in Medabots, Brad Best in Beyblade, Omega Steed in the Spliced episode "Stupid Means Never Having To Say I'm Sorry"), (d. 2010).
- August 2: Butch Patrick, American actor and musician (portrayed and voiced Milo in The Phantom Tollbooth, voiced himself in The Simpsons episode "Eight Misbehavin").
- August 4: Richard White, American actor and opera singer (voice of Gaston in Beauty and the Beast, House of Mouse, and Once Upon a Studio).
- August 8:
  - Jim Jinkins, American animator (creator of Doug, PB&J Otter, and Pinky Dinky Doo, co-creator of Allegra's Window, JoJo's Circus, and Stanley), and voice actor (voice of Daddy Dinky Doo in Pinky Dinky Doo).
  - Don Most, American actor and singer (voice of Ralph Malph in The Fonz and the Happy Days Gang, Eric in Dungeons & Dragons, Stiles in Teen Wolf, himself in the Family Guy episode "It Takes a Village Idiot, and I Married One").
- August 10:
  - Richard Cansino, American voice actor (voice of Kenshin Himura in Ruroni Kenshin, Legato Bluesumers in Trigun, Izumo Kamazuki in Naruto, Tsugaru in Tenchi in Tokyo, Apollo in Cyborg 009, Guardromon in Digimon Tamers).
  - Yoni Chen, Israeli actor (Hebrew dub voice of various Looney Tunes characters and the Tin Man in The Wonderful Wizard of Oz), (d. 1995).
  - Brian Scully, American television writer and producer (The Simpsons, Family Guy).
- August 11: Hulk Hogan, American professional wrestler (portrayed himself in Hulk Hogan's Rock 'n' Wrestling, voice of various characters in Robot Chicken, The Dean in China, IL, Terrafirminator V.O. in Gnomeo & Juliet, himself in Robot Chicken, the American Dad! episode "Stanny Tendergrass", and Camp WWE), (d. 2025).
- August 14: James Horner, American composer and conductor (An American Tail, The Land Before Time, An American Tail: Fievel Goes West, Once Upon a Forest, We're Back! A Dinosaur's Story, The Pagemaster, and Balto), (d. 2015).
- August 16: Kathie Lee Gifford, American actress (voice of Echidna in Hercules, Mail Carrier Hero in Higglytown Heroes).
- August 27: Peter Stormare, Swedish actor (voice of Count Dracula in The Batman vs. Dracula, Mr. Freeze in Justice League Action, Gunther in The Nut Job 2: Nutty by Nature, Godbrand in Castlevania, Rufus in Penn Zero: Part-Time Hero, Fibulon in Teen Titans Go!, Wulfric von Rydingsvard in Big Top Scooby-Doo!, Lord Dregg in Teenage Mutant Ninja Turtles, Prometheus Black and Meltdown in Transformers: Animated, King Xarion in the Ben 10: Ultimate Alien episode "Viktor: The Spoils", Whiplash in the Phineas and Ferb episode "Phineas and Ferb: Mission Marvel").
- August 28: Bob Tzudiker, American film writer (Walt Disney Animation Studios, Anastasia).
- August 29:
  - Doña Croll, British actress (voice of Leopard in Tinga Tinga Tales).
  - Dee Dee Rescher, American actress (voice of Miss Skullnick in Star vs. the Forces of Evil, Ms. Ribble in Captain Underpants: The First Epic Movie, Sister Thornley in Time Squad).
- August 30: Robin Harris, American comedian and actor (Bebe's Kids), (d. 1990).

=== September ===
- September 7: Enzo D'Alò, Italian animator and director (Pimpa, How the Toys Saved Christmas, Lucky and Zorba).
- September 10: Amy Irving, American actress and singer (voice of Miss Kitty in An American Tail: Fievel Goes West, Anastasia in the Stories from My Childhood episode "Beauty and the Beast", singing voice of Jessica Rabbit in Who Framed Roger Rabbit).
- September 20: Doug Preis, American actor (voice of Phil Funnie, Chalky Studebaker, Willie White, Walter "Skunky Beaumont", Mr. Bluff, and Vice Principal Lamar Bone in Doug, Alluro and Lynx-O in ThunderCats, Jovny the Stork in commercials for Vlasic Pickles).

=== October ===
- October 5: Bever-Leigh Banfield, American actress (voice of the Mayor of Bedrock in The Flintstone Kids, Dr. Simon in Pound Puppies, Ms. Wepman in the Static Shock episode "The New Kid", Denise Lund in the Bionic Six episode "Back to the Past").
- October 6: Denis M. Hannigan, American music editor (Rugrats) and composer (Rugrats, Beakman's World, Recess, CatDog, Welcome to Eltingville).
- October 9: Tony Shalhoub, American actor (voice of Luigi in the Cars franchise, Fred in Rumble, Jack Jeebs in Men in Black: The Series, Zopilote in Elena of Avalor, Marvin in Central Park).
- October 13: Melodee Spevack, American voice actress (voice of Shadowland Queen in Once Upon a Time, Earth Fleet Announcements in Robotech II: The Sentinels, Julia in Fist of the North Star, Birdramon, Garudamon, LadyDevimon and Blossomon in Digimon: Digital Monsters, Eldora and Elvira in Flint the Time Detective, Kamui in .hack//Legend of the Twilight, Torpedo Girl in Bobobo-bo Bo-bobo, Misae Ikari in Paranoia Agent, Bell in Haré+Guu, Mikami Kuramitsu in Tenchi Muyo! Ryo-Ohki, Derrida in Ergo Proxy, Kiseno Urano in In This Corner of The World, Foxtail and Ginger in OK K.O.! Let's Be Heroes, VT in the Cowboy Bebop episode "Heavy Metal Queen", additional voices in Lensman: Power of The Lens).
- October 15: Larry Miller, American comedian and actor (voice of XR in Buzz Lightyear of Star Command, Pointy-Haired Boss in Dilbert, Fred Nickle in The Ant Bully, Buzzwell in Bee Movie, Vlad Chocool in Foodfight!, Lynceus in Hercules).
- October 16: Sean Catherine Derek, American writer, story editor and television producer (The Smurfs, Captain Planet and the Planeteers, Batman: The Animated Series, Foodfight!).
- October 27:
  - Peter Firth, English actor (voice of Red in The Rescuers Down Under).
  - Robert Picardo, American actor (voice of Puddingtown in Bravest Warriors, Milton in Quantum Quest: A Cassini Space Odyssey, Amazo in Justice League and Justice League Unlimited, Pfish in What a Cartoon!, Two-Face in the Justice League Action episode "Double Cross", Professor Reddschift in the Buzz Lightyear of Star Command episode "First Missions").
- October 28: Keith Scott, Australian actor and animation historian (continued voice of Bullwinkle J. Moose).

=== November ===
- November 4: Peter Lord, English animator, director and producer (co-creator of Morph, co-founder of Aardman Animations).
- November 7: Lynne Naylor, Canadian designer, animator, artist, director, and producer (co-founder of Spümcø).
- November 8: John Musker, American animator, film director, screenwriter and film producer (Walt Disney Animation Studios).
- November 18:
  - Kevin Nealon, American comedian and actor (voice of Mayor Dewey in Eight Crazy Nights, Glenn Martin in Glenn Martin, DDS, Irwin Winslow in The Goode Family episode "Public Disturbance", I.O.C. Member in the American Dad! episode "Return of the Bling", Gary Stein in the Mike Tyson Mysteries episode "The Stein Way", himself in the Dr. Katz, Professional Therapist episode "Earring" and the Family Guy episode "The Movement").
  - Kath Soucie, American voice actress (voice of Fifi La Fume, Li'l Sneezer and Margot Mallard in Tiny Toon Adventures, Linka in Captain Planet and the Planeteers, Phil, Lil and Betty DeVille in Rugrats, Morgana Macawber in Darkwing Duck, Sally Acorn in Sonic the Hedgehog, Lola Bunny in the Looney Tunes franchise, Princess What's-Her-Name in Earthworm Jim, Dexter's Mom in Dexter's Laboratory, Daisy Duck in Quack Pack, Miriam Pataki in Hey Arnold!, Cadpig and Rolly in 101 Dalmatians: The Series, Cissy Rooney and Mrs. Little in Pepper Ann, Cubert Fransworth in Futurama, Maddie Fenton in Danny Phantom, Tuffy in the Tom and Jerry franchise).
  - Alan Moore, English author (voiced himself in The Simpsons episode "Husbands and Knives").
- November 19: Robert Beltran, American actor (voice of Chief Massasoit in Free Birds, Maurice Bodaway in the Young Justice episode "Beneath", Chakotay in the Star Trek: Prodigy episode "Kobayashi").
- November 21: Larry Hochman, American orchestrator and composer (Wonder Pets!).
- November 23:
  - Ric Heitzman, American actor, storyboard artist (ChalkZone) and director (The PJs).
  - George DelHoyo, Uruguayan-American actor (voice of Señor Flan in Rango, Doctor Fate in the Superman: The Animated Series episode "The Hand of Fate", Captain Zane in the Batman Beyond episode "Final Cut").
- November 27:
  - Curtis Armstrong, American actor and singer (voice of Dan in Dan Vs., Snot Lonstein in American Dad!, Mr. Moleguaco in The Emperor's New School, Robot Default in Robot and Monster, Mr. Bugspit in The Buzz on Maggie, Super Amazing Bouncy Ball in Penn Zero: Part-Time Hero, Mr. Gurdle in The Loud House, Mr. Crummyham in Monsters at Work, Maru in Planes: Fire & Rescue, Constable Lumph in the Rapunzel's Tangled Adventure episode "The Eye of Pincosta", Basil in the It's Pony episode "The Giving Chair", Candy Van Man in the TripTank episode "Candy Van Finger Bang").
  - Richard Stone, American composer (Warner Bros. Animation), (d. 2001).
- November 28: Pamela Hayden, American actress (voice of Milhouse Van Houten, Jimbo Jones, and other various characters in The Simpsons, Douglas McNoggin in Lloyd in Space, Connie in Hey Arnold!, Dawn and Trudy in Pinky and the Brain, Steve and Lance the Pants in Recess, Geena in The New Batman Adventures episode "Old Wounds", Rita in the Bonkers episode "Love Struck").

=== December ===
- December 6:
  - Tom Hulce, American actor and producer (voice of Quasimodo in The Hunchback of Notre Dame, The Hunchback of Notre Dame II, and Once Upon a Studio).
  - Kin Shriner, American actor (voice of Green Arrow in Justice League Unlimited).
  - Masami Kurumada, Japanese manga artist and writer (Saint Seiya).
- December 7: Buzz Dixon, American television writer (Filmation, Ruby-Spears Enterprises, Marvel Productions, Bionic Six, Spiral Zone, Garbage Pail Kids, Superman, Chip 'n Dale: Rescue Rangers, Teenage Mutant Ninja Turtles, Tiny Toon Adventures, Conan the Adventurer, Batman: The Animated Series, Stunt Dawgs, Wild West C.O.W.-Boys of Moo Mesa, G.I. Joe Extreme).
- December 8:
  - Kim Basinger, American actress (portrayed and voiced Holli Would in Cool World, voiced herself in The Simpsons episode "When You Dish Upon a Star").
  - Roy Firestone, American sports commentator and journalist (voice of Announcer in Daffy Duck's Quackbusters, Fob Piotrowski in the Pepper Ann episode "P.A.'s Pop Fly", himself in The Simpsons episode "Bart Star", additional voices in Mighty Ducks: The Animated Series).
- December 9: John Malkovich, American actor (voice of Mr. B in Ten Year Old Tom, Dave in Penguins of Madagascar).
- December 12: Marc Graue, American voice actor (voice of Bok Choi in Larryboy: The Cartoon Adventures, Mr. Kone in Arthur's Missing Pal, Xin Fu in Avatar: The Last Airbender, Kjeld Kirk Kristiansen and Wholesaler in The Lego Story, Mad Hatter in Ever After High, Captain Black John Licorice in the Codename: Kids Next Door episode "Operation L.I.C.O.R.I.C.E.", Anchorman in the Random! Cartoons episode "Super John Doe Junior", Magical River in the Motown Magic episode "The Tracks of My Tears") and recording engineer (What a Cartoon!).
- December 13:
  - Gail Matthius, American actress and comedian (voice of Shirley the Loon in Tiny Toon Adventures, Martha Sven-Generic in Bobby's World, Miss Molly Coddle in Bump in the Night, Lana and Candie Chipmunk in Animaniacs, Mrs. Roswell in the Detention episode "Boys 'n the Parenthood").
  - Ruben A. Aquino, Japanese-born Filipino-American animator (Walt Disney Animation Studios).
- December 15: J. M. DeMatteis, American writer (Warner Bros. Animation, The Real Ghostbusters, Spider-Man).
- December 16:
  - Rebecca Forstadt, American voice actress (voice of Lynn Minmei in Robotech, Maya in Captain Harlock and the Queen of a Thousand Years, Patty Rabbit in Maple Town, Rebecca in Spartakus and the Sun Beneath the Sea, Female Newscaster #2 in Akira, Mihoshi Kuramitsu in Tenchi Muyo!, Ai in Digimon: Digital Monsters, Cindy and Show Spokeswoman in Hey Arnold!, Tima in Metropolis, Anna in The Little Polar Bear, Chizuko Oe in Mahoromatic, Sugar in A Little Snow Fairy Sugar, Kaede Misumi in Please Teacher! and Please Twins!, Drive Time Weather Newscaster and Tachikoma in Ghost in the Shell: Stand Alone Complex, Tama-chan in Bottle Fairy, Rushka in Zatch Bell!, Kanata Izumi and Hikage Miyakawa in Lucky Star, Nunnally Lamperouge in Code Geass, Little Miss Giggles in The Mr. Men Show, Eva in Puppy in My Pocket: Adventures in Pocketville, additional voices in Antz and Bling) and television writer (Digimon: Digital Monsters).
  - Babi Floyd, American actor and singer (voice of Sock and Vowells Announcer in the Between the Lions episode "The Lost Rock", Face in Nick Jr. ads, additional voices in Courage the Cowardly Dog, performed the Pokérap in Pokémon: Indigo League, announcer for Nickelodeon and Nick on CBS), (d. 2013).
- December 31: James Remar, American actor (voice of Vilgax in Ben 10: Alien Force and Ben 10: Ultimate Alien, Two-Face in Batman: The Brave and the Bold, Black Mask in The Batman, Tonraq in The Legend of Korra, Hawkman in Justice League Unlimited).

=== Specific date unknown ===
- Neil Affleck, Canadian actor, animator, sheet timer (Rugrats, The Critic, King of the Hill, The Simpsons Movie) and director (The Simpsons, Family Guy, Nelvana).

== Deaths ==
=== August ===
- August 3: Harry E. Lang, American actor (voice of Tom in a few Tom and Jerry cartoons), dies at age 58 from a heart attack.

=== November ===
- November 29: Milt Gross, American cartoonist and animator (Bray Productions, Metro-Goldwyn-Mayer cartoon studio, Screen Gems, adapted his comic strip Count Screwloose into two animated short films), dies at age 58.

== See also ==
- List of anime by release date (1946–1959)
