= Invention for Destruction =

1958 film by Karel Zeman

- Czech theatrical release poster
- Directed by: Karel Zeman
- Written by: Karel Zeman; František Hrubín; Jiří Brdečka; Milan Vacha
- Based on: Facing the Flag by Jules Verne
- Produced by: Zdeněk Novák
- Starring: Lubor Tokoš; Arnošt Navrátil; Miloslav Holub
- Cinematography: Jiří Tarantík; Bohuslav Pikhart; Antonín Horák
- Edited by: Zdeněk Stehlík
- Music by: Zdeněk Liška
- Distributed by: Československý Státní Film
- Release date: 1958
- Running time: 83 minutes
- Country: Czechoslovakia
- Language: Czech

Invention for Destruction (Czech: Vynález zkázy) (aka The Fabulous World of Jules Verne) is a 1958 Czechoslovak black-and-white science fiction adventure film, directed by Karel Zeman, produced by Zdeněk Novák, and starring Lubor Tokoš, Arnošt Navrátil, and Miloslav Holub. Based on several works by Jules Verne, primarily his 1896 novel Facing the Flag (with which the film shares its Czech title), the film evokes the original illustrations for Verne's works by combining live actors with various forms of animation.

The film was distributed in North America by Warner Bros. Pictures in 1961 and was dubbed into English and retitled The Fabulous World of Jules Verne. It was distributed in 72 countries around the world, where it received widespread attention. It is considered the most successful Czech film ever made.

During the 2000s, a 35 mm print of the original film, with English subtitles, was shown internationally at film festivals with the on-screen English title A Deadly Invention. In 2014 to 2015, a digital restoration was made which includes the reinsertion of a cut scene not included since the film's original 1958 previews. Now both the original Czech version, with English subtitles, and the English-dubbed version are internationally available, restored in high-definition video under the title Invention for Destruction.

== Plot ==
A gang of pirates working for the evil Count Artigas kidnap a scientist and his assistant in order to obtain the secret of the scientist's futuristic weapon. This weapon is intended to be used in the Count's plan for world domination.

== Cast ==
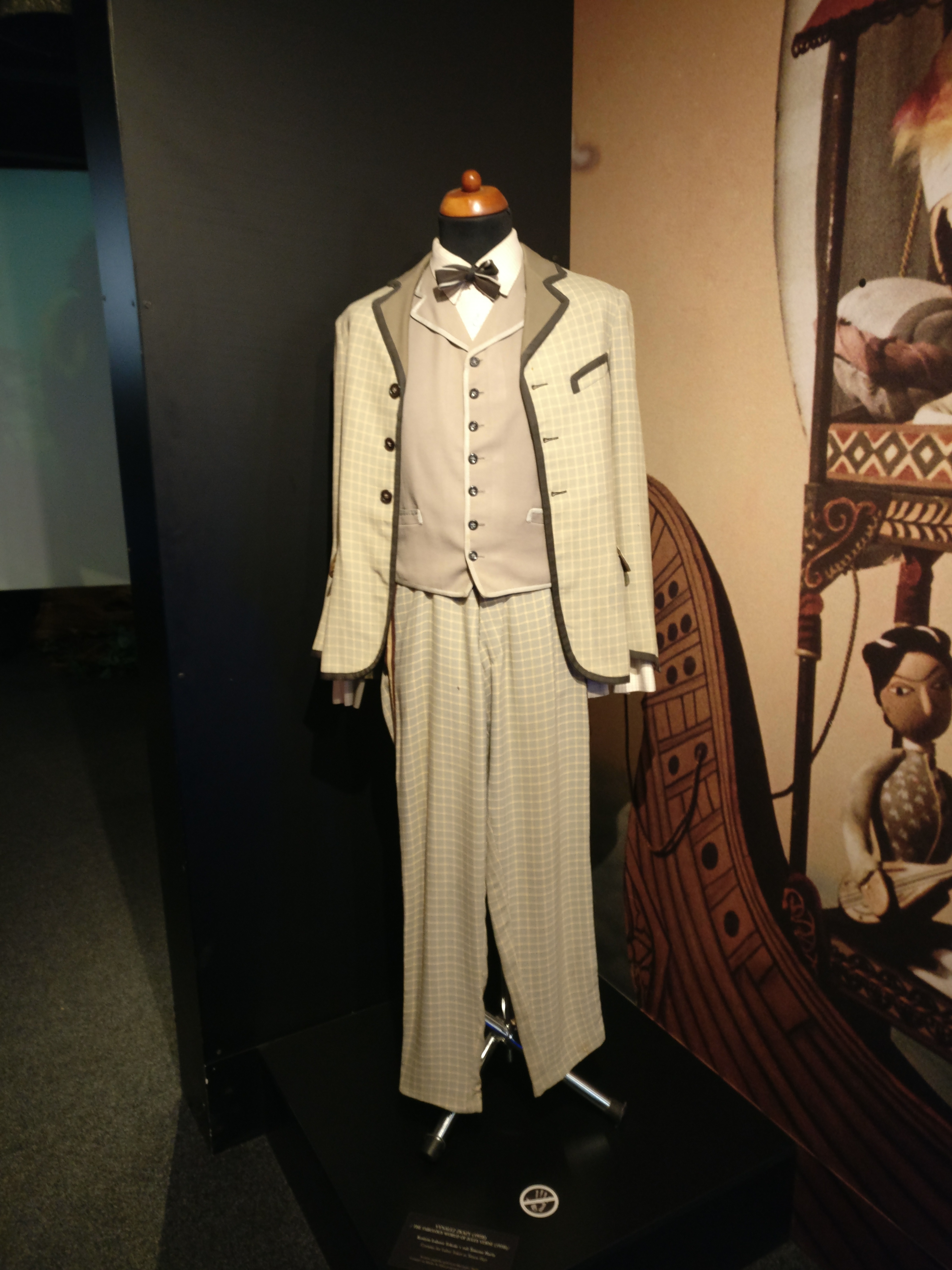
Costume of Lubor Tokoš as Simon Hart

- Lubor Tokoš as Simon Hart
- Arnošt Navrátil as Professor Roch
- Miloslav Holub as Count Artigas
- František Šlégr as Captain Spade
- Václav Kyzlink as Engineer Serke
- Jana Zatloukalová as Jana
- Otto Šimánek as Man in Train (uncredited)
- Václav Trégl (uncredited)
- František Černý (uncredited)

== Production ==
=== Sources ===
Karel Zeman, a Czech film director and animator, was deeply influenced by the novels of Jules Verne, making four feature films between 1955 and 1970, and drawing extensively on Verne's Voyages Extraordinaires series. The first of these, Journey to the Beginning of Time, was inspired by Journey to the Center of the Earth and featured a scene in which its heroes directly acknowledged their fondness for reading Verne. The second of Zeman's Verne-based films was Vynález zkázy; the later ones were The Stolen Airship, based on Two Years' Vacation, and On the Comet, based on Hector Servadac.

The main literary source material for Vynález zkázy was Verne's 1896 novel Facing the Flag. However, rather than a straightforward literal adaptation of the novel, Zeman conceived the film as if the story were being retold by one of its characters, the young engineer Simon Hart. Moreover, since Facing the Flag included many memorable Vernian motifs, including submarines, volcanoes, mysterious figures in possession of powerful technologies, and other ideas, Zeman also opted to include themes and elements from other Verne novels. For example, the undersea sequences include references to Twenty Thousand Leagues Under the Seas and the aircraft Albatross from Robur the Conqueror. Another Verne novel, The Mysterious Island, may also have supplied some details.

The film also pays tribute to the style of the pioneering early filmmaker Georges Méliès. Zeman likely saw Méliès's work at the Czech National Film Archive in Prague, where hand-colored prints were available of The Impossible Voyage (1904), The Witch (1906), and The Diabolic Tenant (1909). Zeman freely used details from Méliès's style as inspiration; for example, Vynález zkázy's piston-powered steam engine and submarine are creatively adapted variants of those in The Impossible Voyage. Other possible cinematic sources include Fritz Lang's 1927 film Metropolis, Sergei Eisenstein's 1925 film Battleship Potemkin, and possibly even Stuart Paton's 1916 version of 20,000 Leagues Under the Sea.

=== Style ===
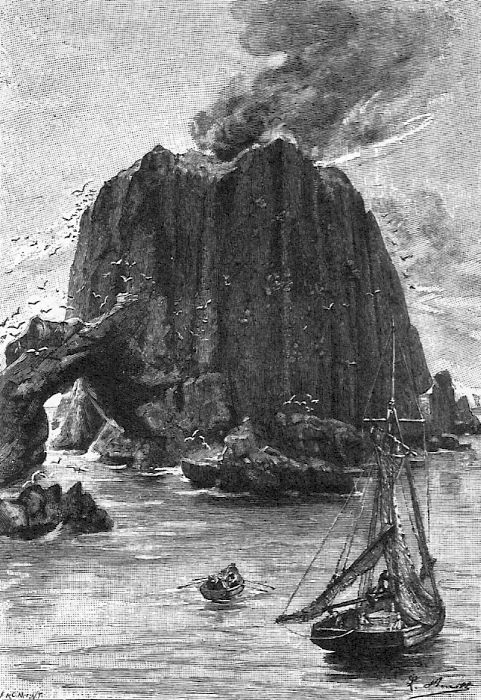
"Back-Cup Island": one of several Léon Benett engravings faithfully recreated in the film

The film has long been noted for its unique visual style, which faithfully recreates that of the Victorian line engravings (by Édouard Riou, Léon Benett, and others) featured in the original editions of Verne's novels. According to Karel Zeman's daughter Ludmila Zeman: "As a child, I remember I had all the books with those beautiful engravings. I really can't visualize the story any other way. And my father felt, because he adored Verne [...] it can only be a good [re]telling to use the same techniques". Karel Zeman, in explaining his process, elaborated on the same point:

The magic of Verne's novels lies in what we would call the world of the romantically fantastic adventure spirit; a world directly associated with the totally specific which the original illustrators knew how to evoke in the mind of the reader … I came to the conclusion that my Verne film must come not only from the spirit of the literary work, but also from the characteristic style of the original illustrations and must maintain at least the impression of engravings.

Much of this impression was created in-camera, thanks to the film's production design. Zeman's crew made and used hard rubber paint rollers to add engraving-like hatching to scenery and costumes. (In a review of the film, Pauline Kael noted that "there are more stripes, more patterns on the clothing, the decor, and on the image itself than a sane person can easily imagine".) To complete the effect, Zeman and his crew composited the film with various forms of animation, including traditional, cut-out, and stop-motion, along with miniature effects and matte paintings, all designed to keep the engraving style seamlessly consistent. Even stock footage clips of birds, sea waves, and other details were adapted for the effect by printing the film with lined filters and matted-in sky backgrounds.

To match the visuals, Zeman directed his actors to move in a decorously stylized fashion, commenting: "My heroes were not allowed even to sneeze or scratch their heads; they had to adapt themselves completely to their unreal surroundings".

=== Music ===
The film's score was written by Zdeněk Liška, a highly regarded film composer known for his skill with musical characterizations and humor, as well as for his innovative use of electronic music techniques. In the mid-20th century, he was the foremost Czech composer of fantasy film scores. The score is written in an old-fashioned style complementing the quaintness of the visuals, and often redolent of the film's imaginary machinery. Liska would suggest editing cuts to the director, to speed up the rhythm of the film and to make his music flow more smoothly with what is on screen.

The main theme, reminiscent of a music box, is scored for harpsichord, accompanied by a chamber ensemble of string instruments and woodwinds. The love theme, apparently based on the song "Tit-willow" from the Gilbert and Sullivan comic opera The Mikado, is likewise played by woodwinds and a muted harpsichord. Liška's score also includes various shorter cues, such as a short pathos-filled theme for the sinking of the ship Amelie, keyboard strikes matching the attacks on the giant octopus, and a serene finale for string orchestra. The film's score remains one of Liška's most notable works.

== Themes ==
Vynález zkázy treats the scientific themes of Jules Verne's novels with gently satiric affection, implicitly praising Verne's style while deliberately pointing up the quaintness of the science involved. In an interview, Ludmila Zeman summed up the film's themes, saying that Verne "always warned that even if the future is technologically perfect with all these mod cons, it needs love, it needs poetry, it needs magic. He believed only these can make people feel happy and loved".

== Release and reception ==
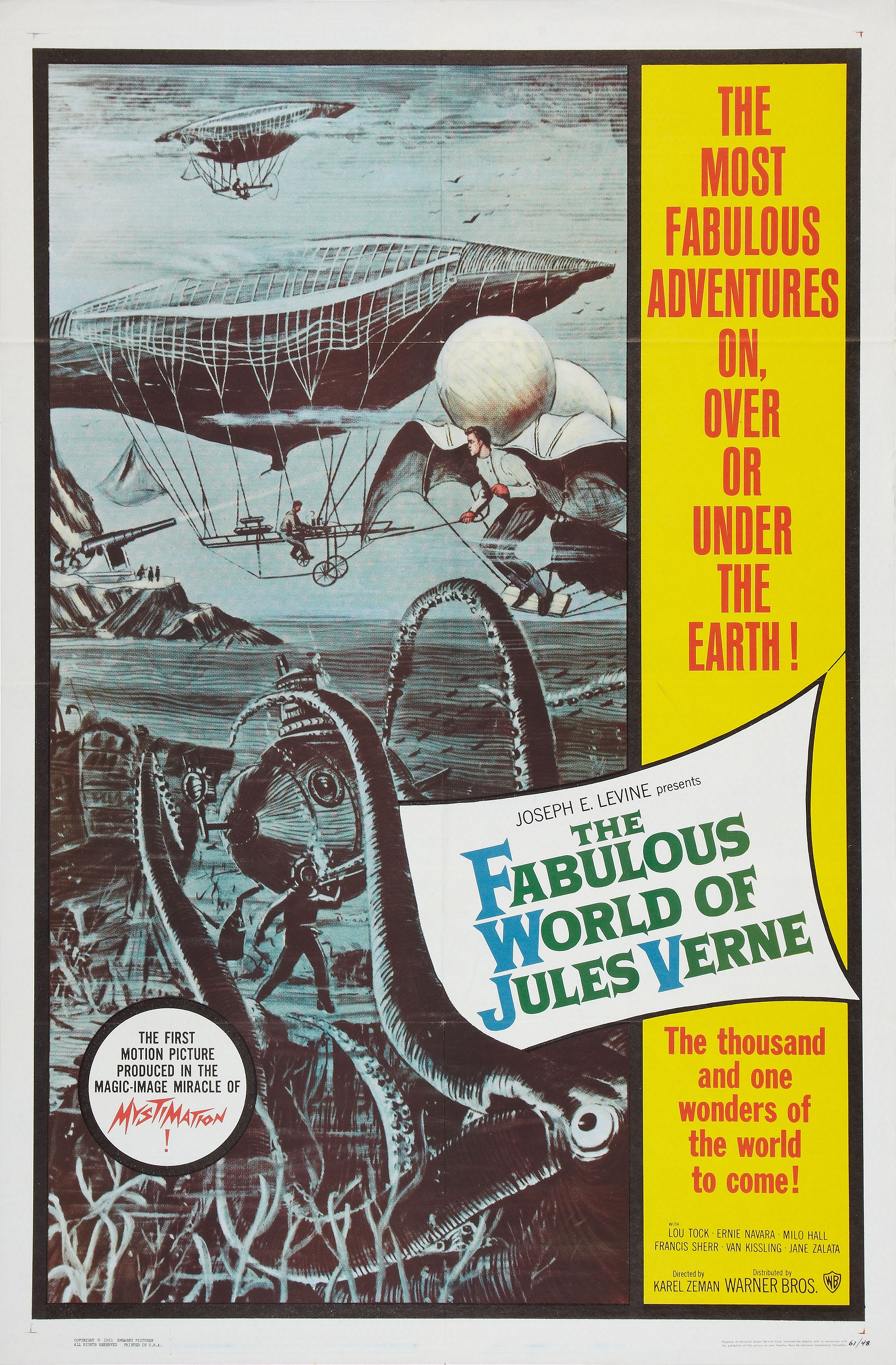
U.S. theatrical release poster by Reynold Brown, featuring a new title and advertising style

Vynález zkázy premiered in Czechoslovakia on 22 August 1958, and was featured at Expo 58 in Brussels, where it won the Grand Prix at the International Film Festival. Over the following year, the film also garnered a Silver Sombrero at the First International Film Festival in Guadalajara, a Czechoslovak Film Critics Award, a Crystal Star from the French Academy of Film, and other awards. In France, André Bazin praised the film in Cahiers du cinéma, and Paul Louis Thirard reviewed it warmly in Positif. The director Alain Resnais named it as one of the ten best films of the year. In 2010, a publication of the Czech Ministry of Foreign Affairs estimated Vynález zkázy as the most successful film in the history of Czech cinema.

The film was brought to the United States in 1961 by American entrepreneur Joseph E. Levine. He had it dubbed into English and changed the title to The Fabulous World of Jules Verne. Warner Bros. Pictures released it as a double feature for children with Bimbo the Great. For this release, many of the cast and crew were billed with anglicized names: Lubor Tokoš, Arnošt Navrátil, and Miloslav Holub were credited as Louis Tock, Ernest Navara, and Milo Holl, respectively. The American release also replaced the original introductory segment with one by American television star Hugh Downs.

Following the American release, the film won several additional high-profile admirers. The New York Times critic Howard Thompson found it "fresh, funny and highly imaginative," with "a marvelous eyeful of trick effects". Pauline Kael was similarly glowing, calling the film a "wonderful giddy science fantasy" and adding that Zeman "sustains the Victorian tone, with its delight in the magic of science, that makes Verne seem so playfully archaic". Charles Stinson of the Los Angeles Times began his highly positive film review by saying: "The Fabulous World of Jules Verne is precisely that. For once the title writers and the press agents have been found failing to exaggerate. They'd better watch it". Thanks to the American release, the film was nominated for science fiction's 1962 Hugo Award for Best Dramatic Presentation. The film, however, was not a box-office success in America, where the well-established Hollywood science fiction film tradition had led audiences to expect heightened realism rather than Zeman's deliberately stylized visuals.

Bill Warren, in his 1982 encyclopedia of 1950s science fiction films, Keep Watching the Skies, wrote that Vynález zkázy was "the best film covered in this book", as well as "the best movie ever adapted from a work by Verne". In 2010, a commentator for Experimental Conversations said that the film "must stand alongside [The Cabinet of Dr. Caligari] as one of the great visual and stylistic triumphs of the cinematic medium" and that Zeman's process "really does need to be seen to be believed". In 2011, the science fiction writer John C. Wright identified Vynález zkázy as the first steampunk work and Zeman as the inventor of that genre, commenting that if the film "is not the steam-powered Holy Grail of Steampunkishness, it surely ought to be".

The film was screened by the Museum of Modern Art in December 2012 as part of the exhibition An Auteurist History of Film. MoMA's film curator Charles Silver called the film "a bubbling over […] of unprecedented imagination" with "an undeniably poetic fairy-tale quality". It was screened again in New York City in August 2014 by the Film Society of Lincoln Center, as part of the series "Strange Lands: International Sci-Fi". In The Village Voice, Alan Scherstuhl commented that "The handmade dazzlements still dazzle today ... Could it be that old special effects, dependent upon camera tricks and theatrical invention, stir something sympathetic in us that glossy pixels do not, inviting us not just to dream along with the fantasy but also the painstaking creation thereof"?

In 2014, the Karel Zeman Museum in Prague announced that they, in collaboration with České bijáky and Czech TV, had begun a complete digital restoration of the film, planned to be premiered in Italy at Expo 2015. This restored version was released in 2015 on DVD and Blu-ray for the first time by Bontonfilm in the Czech Republic. Also in 2015, the film was released in the United Kingdom on Blu-ray by Second Run and in the United States in 2020 by The Criterion Collection as part of a Karel Zeman set. These releases carried the English title Invention for Destruction. Both non-Criterion releases are region-free and include the original Czech version, with English subtitles and the English-dubbed version, and both have different supplementary features.

== See also ==
- HMS Sword
