= Miloslav Holub =

- Born: 27 February 1915; Běchovice, Austria-Hungary
- Died: 12 March 1999 (aged 84); Ostrava, Czech Republic
- Occupation: Actor
- Years active: 1947–87

Miloslav Holub should not be confused with the Czech poet Miroslav Holub.

Miloslav Holub (27 February 1915 – 12 March 1999) was a Czech actor, perhaps best known for his appearances (ranging from leads to cameo roles) in five films by Karel Zeman. He was also occasionally billed as Miroslav Holub.

== Selected filmography ==
- The Trap (1950)
- Operation B (1952)
- The Tank Brigade (1955)
- The Fabulous World of Jules Verne (1958)
- The Slinger (1960)
- The Fabulous Baron Munchausen (1961)
- A Jester's Tale (1964) (as Miroslav Holub)
- The Stolen Airship (1967)
- On the Comet (1970)
- The Ear (1970)
- The Key (1971)
