= John McGrew =

American animator, painter and musician

John Burton McGrew (March 19, 1910 – January 11, 1999) was an American animator, painter and musician. Although best known for working at Leon Schlesinger Productions on Warner Bros.' Looney Tunes and Merrie Melodies, where he was the studio's first designated layout artist, working under Chuck Jones, he was also known as a member of the Hollywood blacklist.

== Career ==
McGrew trained at the Chouinard Art Institute, and joined the background artist department at Leon Schlesinger Productions shortly after graduation. When Chuck Jones (a fellow Chouinard alumnus) was promoted to director in 1938, he soon became dissatisfied at the backgrounds being provided for the cartoons. At this stage, the animation units did not have their own layout artists or background painters (with the exception of Bob Clampett's unit, which was technically a separate studio run by Schlesinger's brother-in-law Ray Katz; Clampett's background designer, Elmer Plummer was effectively the first Schlesinger/Warner Bros. layout artist, though he never officially held the title), and a separate department was tasked with providing background elements for each of the studio's three main units. The directors were generally not given any say in what backgrounds they were provided with. Eventually, Jones gained permission from studio head Leon Schlesinger to take a layout artist and background painter for his own unit, and Jones picked McGrew as layout artist, with Paul Julian serving as background painter. The experiment proved a success, and the backgrounds department was soon disbanded, with directors choosing their own layout and background artists.

Previously, the studio's backgrounds had been considered to be somewhat unattractive by Jones, using a fairly mundane style with muted colors (which Jones disparagingly referred to as "shit-brindle"). Under McGrew and his contemporary layout artists (including Thomas McKimson in Robert Clampett's unit, along with Owen Fitzgerald and then Hawley Pratt in Friz Freleng's unit), the animators pioneered a far more abstract method of drawing the backgrounds, which set them apart from competing studios such as Disney.

Cartoons that McGrew designed in his abstract style include three 1942 Warner Bros. shorts directed by Jones: Conrad the Sailor with Daffy Duck, Case of the Missing Hare with Bugs Bunny, and one of Jones' most renowned works, The Dover Boys at Pimento University. While Jones's subsequent layout designers, Earl Klein and later Robert Gribbroek would return to a more normal style of background design, his most famous layout man, Maurice Noble took up an abstract style that in many ways resembled McGrew's earlier work.

In September 1942, McGrew left the Schlesinger studio and entered the Navy to fight in World War II. After the war, continued to work as an artist and occasional animator. However, McGrew's career in the United States was effectively ended when his former Schlesinger background painter, Gene Fleury, testified to the House Un-American Activities Committee that he and his wife, Bernyce Polifka - also a Schlesinger background artist - had seen several fellow artists, including McGrew when they were attending Communist Party meetings. While McGrew had not been an active member of several years, this was enough to get him added to the blacklist.

In the wake of this, McGrew began touring Europe with his artwork. He eventually settled in France, where he would spend the rest of his life, painting and also giving concerts with his longtime companion, the French cello player André Gonnet. He was living in Le Bois d'Oingt, near Lyon, at the time of his death.
