= The Tale of John and Mary =

- Poster for the film
- Directed by: Karel Zeman
- Written by: Karel Zeman
- Starring: Antonín Procházka; Nada Konvalinková; Frantisek Filipovský
- Narrated by: Otakar Brousek
- Cinematography: Zdenék Krupa
- Edited by: Ivan Matous
- Music by: Karel Svoboda
- Production company: Filmové Studio Gottwaldov
- Distributed by: Ustredni Pujcovna Filmu
- Release date: November 1, 1980
- Running time: 64 minutes
- Country: Czechoslovakia
- Language: Czech

The Tale of John and Mary (Czech: Pohádka o Honzíkovi a Mařence) is a 1980 Czechoslovak animated film directed by Karel Zeman. This is the last film by Zeman, based on Czech fairy tales. The film is created using cutout animation.

The images of John and Mary were featured at the 200 Czech Crown silver coin minted in memory of Zeman.
