= Adventures of Sinbad the Sailor =

1974 film

- Original Czech poster
- Directed by: Karel Zeman
- Written by: Jiří Gold; Karel Zeman
- Narrated by: Jan Tříska
- Cinematography: Bohuslav Pikhart
- Edited by: Ivan Matouš
- Music by: František Belfín
- Release date: 1 November 1974
- Running time: 88 minutes
- Country: Czechoslovakia
- Language: Czech

Pohádky tisíce a jedné noci (literally Tales of 1,001 Nights) is a 1974 Czechoslovak animated film directed by Karel Zeman. The film combines the voyages of Sindbad the Sailor with elements of other tales from the Arabian Nights. Released in America as Adventures of Sinbad the Sailor, it is also known as A Thousand and One Nights. The film was animated using paper cutouts and draws its visual inspiration from Persian miniatures.

== Synopsis ==
=== The First Voyage ===
Originally released as the short Dobrodružství námořníka Sindibáda (literally "Adventures of Sindbad the Sailor", 14 minutes, 1971).

=== The Second Voyage ===
Originally released as the short Druhá cesta námořníka Sindibáda (lit. "The Second Voyage of Sindbad the Sailor", 13 min., 1972).

=== The Third Voyage ===
Originally released as the short V zemi obrů (lit. "In the Land of Giants", 13 min., 1973).

=== The Fourth Voyage ===
Originally released as the short Magnetová hora (lit. "The Magnet Mountain", 15 min., 1973).

=== The Fifth Voyage ===
Originally released as the short Létající koberec (lit. "The Flying Carpet", 11 min., 1973).

=== The Sixth Voyage ===
Originally released as the short Mořský sultán (lit. "The Sultan of the Sea", 10 min., 1974).

=== The Seventh Voyage ===
Originally released as the short Zkrocený démon (lit. "Taming the Demon", 12 min., 1974).

== Voice cast ==
Character	Original	English
Narrator	Jan Tříska	Unknown
