= Inspiration (1949 film) =

Inspirace
- Directed by: Karel Zeman
- Written by: Karel Zeman
- Starring: Karel Zeman
- Cinematography: Antonín Horák
- Edited by: Zdeněk Stehlík
- Music by: Zdeněk Liška
- Release date: 1 January 1949
- Running time: 10 minutes
- Country: Czechoslovakia
- Language: Czech

Inspiration (Czech: Inspirace) is a 1949 Czechoslovak animated short film directed by Karel Zeman. It is a wordless stop-motion film made using glass figurines. The characters in the film are stock characters from Italian commedia dell'arte.

== Plot synopsis ==
An unnamed man, implied to be an artist, is looking at a drop of water by his window. In it, he sees the clown Pierrot being spurned by his beloved Columbine, who is riding in a horse-drawn carriage.
