= White Darkness (film) =

1948 film

- Directed by: František Čáp
- Written by: Ruzena Fischerova; Miloslav Fábera; Leopold Lahola; Frantisek Cáp
- Produced by: Josef Beran
- Starring: Július Pántik; Mária Prechovská; Boris Andreyev
- Cinematography: Václav Hunka
- Edited by: Jan Kohout
- Music by: Jiří Srnka
- Production company: Ceskoslovenský Státní Film
- Distributed by: Rozdelovna Filmu
- Release date: 27 August 1948
- Running time: 112 minutes
- Country: Czechoslovakia
- Language: Czech

White Darkness (Czech: Bílá tma) is a 1948 Czech war drama film directed by Frantisek Cáp and starring Július Pántik, Mária Prechovská and Boris Andreyev. The film's sets were designed by the art directors Miroslav Pelc and Karel Skvor.

== Synopsis ==
During the Second World War partisans take to the mountains during winter to resist the German occupation.

== Cast ==
- Július Pántik as Doctor Pavel Kafka
- Mária Prechovská as Nurse Katka
- Boris Andreyev as Soviet partisan Dugin
- Natasa Tanská as Nurse Rozka Kafková
- Jozef Budský as Laco Pánek
- Ladislav H. Struna as Jan Holesa
- Julius Bartfay as Jano
- Ladislav Chudík as Believer
- Rudolf Deyl as Zika
- Frantisek Dibarbora as Strategist
- Vladimír Durdík as Maj. Mraz
- Stefan Figura as Dobrák
- Zdenek Hodr as Soldier
- Branislav Koren as Partisan
- Jozef Kovác as Jedlík
- Frantisek Kovárík as Pilar
- Radovan Lukavský as German commander
- Dana Medrická as Helena
- Ludovit Ozabal as Partisan
- Vladimír Salac as Jirka
- Juraj Sebok as Porter
- Jozef Sándor as Adam
- Olga Sýkorová as Holesova
- Martin Tapák as Nazarov
- Gustáv Valach as Demo
- Karol L. Zachar as Reader
- Viliam Záborsky as Pedant

== Bibliography ==
- Taylor, Richard (ed.) The BFI companion to Eastern European and Russian cinema. British Film Institute, 2000.
- Wohl, Eugen & Păcurar, Elena. Language of the Revolution: The Discourse of Anti-Communist Movements in the "Eastern Bloc" Countries: Case Studies. Springer Nature, 2023.
