= The Cleveland Show season 4 =

The Cleveland Show
- Season 4
- DVD cover
- No. of episodes: 23

Release
- Original network: Fox
- Original release: October 7, 2012 – May 19, 2013

Season chronology
- ← Previous; Season 3 Next → "He's Bla-ack!"

The fourth and final season of The Cleveland Show aired on the Fox network from October 7, 2012, to May 19, 2013. On May 9, 2011, Fox announced that the series had been renewed for a fourth season. Guest stars for the season included George Clinton, Nick Offerman, Dale Earnhardt Jr., Shorty Rossi, Kasey Kahne and Tony Stewart. On May 13, 2013, Fox announced that they would not be renewing The Cleveland Show for another season, making this one the final season. The series ended with the episode "Wheel! Of! Family!" on May 19, 2013. In August 2013, series creator Seth MacFarlane announced that Cleveland would be moving back to Quahog along with the Tubbs family to rejoin the Family Guy cast.

== Cast and characters ==
- Mike Henry as Cleveland Brown and Rallo Tubbs
- Sanaa Lathan as Donna Tubbs Brown
- Reagan Gomez-Preston as Roberta Tubbs
- Kevin Michael Richardson as Cleveland Brown Jr.

== Episode list ==
No. overall	No. in season	Title	Directed by	Written by	Original release date	Prod. code	US viewers (millions)
66	1	"Escape from Goochland"	Jack Perkins	Courtney Lilly	October 7, 2012	4APS04	4.47
Cleveland and the gang visit their rival high school in Goochland for the annual football game, but when Federline, the gang's designated driver (who Cleveland only brought along because he was the original designated driver and he wanted to drink), destroys the car belonging to Cleveland's nemesis Chet Butler, they must find a way to escape their enemy's home turf. Meanwhile, Donna takes back Roberta's Halloween hooker costume, but decides to wear it instead, and Roberta and Cleveland Jr. play pranks around Stoolbend when they dress up as Donna and Cleveland.
67	2	"Menace II Secret Society"	Ron Rubio	Clarence Livingston	November 4, 2012	3APS22	3.95
Cleveland confronts now super-famous rapper Kenny West about not sharing credit for the megahit they created together, "Be-Cleve in Yourself". He soon discovers Kenny's involvement in a secret hip-hop society with will.i.am, ?uestlove, Bruno Mars and Nicki Minaj. Meanwhile, Cleveland Jr. starts a polka band after being rejected by his school's marching band.
68	3	"A General Thanksgiving Episode"	Justin Ridge	Courtney Lilly	November 18, 2012	3APS08	3.26
When Holt misses his plane to California for Thanksgiving, he reveals that he was not even invited to his estranged family's holiday dinner. To help him get over his Thanksgiving blues, Rallo invites Holt's father over for the holidays, which ends up making Holt's family relationship worse. Meanwhile, Cleveland tries to open an airport bar, but ends up drunk and flying a stolen airplane.
69	4	"Turkey Pot Die"	Anthony Agrusa	Dave Jeser & Matt Silverstein	November 25, 2012	4APS06	4.32
Cleveland's idea to take Cleveland Jr. to a turkey farm to bag one for Thanksgiving dinner does not fly with the young guy, who instead hatches a plan to free the birds. Meanwhile, Rallo and Donna team to construct a Thanksgiving Day float.
70	5	"A Vas Deferens Between Men & Women"	Jeff Myers	John Viener	December 2, 2012	4APS02	3.37
When Donna decides that she wants another child, Cleveland realizes he must keep his vasectomy a secret from her. Meanwhile, Rallo gets the lead role in the community play production of Annie.
71	6	"Tis the Cleveland to Be Sorry"	Oreste Canestrelli	Chadd Gindin	December 16, 2012	4APS08	3.06
Cleveland discovers that the food served at the local homeless shelter is much better than it is at home, so he pretends to be homeless to benefit from the meals. But when the community catches onto his ill-spirited scheme, they confront him and he must apologize to everyone. Meanwhile, chauvinistic store owner Harris Grundle hires Roberta as a Christmas elf, but requires all of Santa's female helpers to wear sexy elf costumes.
72	7	"Hustle 'N' Bros"	Seung-Woo Cha	Kirker Butler	January 13, 2013	4APS03	2.66
When Donna's ex-husband, Robert crashes Freight Train's birthday party and upstages Cleveland's gift for him, he adopts Robert and he and Cleveland become brothers. Meanwhile, to pay off a debt, Junior and Rallo track down lost dogs for cash -- and go after the big reward: Mr. Waterman's pooch, Rock Hudson.
73	8	"Wide World of Cleveland Show"	Ron Rubio	Aaron Lee	January 27, 2013	4APS07	2.57
Cleveland hosts a special episode showing what The Cleveland Show is like in different parts of the world.
74	9	"Here Comes the Bribe"	Jack Perkins	Dave Jeser & Matt Silverstein	February 10, 2013	4APS12	2.76
After Cleveland botches his part during the renewal of their wedding vows, Donna hustles him to marriage counseling, where the mediator informs Cleveland that, for a price, he can slant the "treatments" the husband's way. Meanwhile, Junior's refrigerator breaks, so he and Rallo turn it into a hotel-style minibar.
75	10	"When a Man (or a Freight Train) Loves His Cookie"	Phil Allora	Clarence Livingston	February 17, 2013	4APS05	2.63
When Freight Train misses his and Cookie's anniversary bash, she decides to hit the road with George Clinton and the P-Funk All-Stars, leaving Freight Train and Cleveland to track her down. Meanwhile, Junior's visit to an office-supply store sparks an elaborate fantasy.
76	11	"Brownsized"	Phil Allora	Steven Ross	March 3, 2013	4APS13	3.28
With the promise of six-months severance pay (in exchange for everyone else losing their health benefits), Cleveland deep-sixes his job, but is having a tough time trying to find a way to tell Donna. Meanwhile, Federline forgets his and Roberta's anniversary, so Rallo finds her a handsome new man, Devon (voiced by Kid Cudi), but finds that Devon is straitlaced and boring to the point of being annoying and holier-than-thou.
77	12	"Pins, Spins and Fins! (Shark Story Cut for Time)"	Steve Robertson	Jonathan Green & Gabe Miller	March 3, 2013	4APS09	3.78
Rallo's ego rolls out of control when he starts to think he is an ace bowler because he keeps throwing strikes with help from the gutter rails, so it is up to Donna to get him to toe the line. Meanwhile, Cleveland, Lester, Holt and Tim fear their friendship is stagnating, so they head to an abandoned amusement park.
78	13	"A Rodent Like This"	Seung-Woo Cha	Aaron Lee	March 10, 2013	4APS11	4.04
A rat running rampant in the house sends Donna and the children to stay with her mother, while Cleveland is left behind to deal with the rodent. Reveling in having the place to himself, Cleveland soon bonds with his new pet pal, whom he names Rat Lauer. Meanwhile, Rallo and Junior play spies, but not all goes well when Junior refuses to reveal what is in his secret-agent briefcase.
79	14	"The Hangover: Part Tubbs"	Ron Rubio	Aaron Lee	March 17, 2013	4APS14	2.83
Donna tries to run for the school board, but her plans are thwarted when Cleveland accidentally kills a new friend playing a game. Meanwhile, Cleveland Jr. discovers that he is an excellent diver, but has doubts about joining the team because of the skimpy Speedo he must wear.
80	15	"California Dreamin' (All the Cleves Are Brown)"	Oreste Canestrelli	Dave Jeser & Matt Silverstein	March 17, 2013	3APS23	4.05
Cleveland and his family move to California so he can pursue his dream of becoming a baseball scout.
81	16	"Who Done Did It?"	Jeff Myers	Kevin Biggins & Travis Bowe	April 7, 2013	4APS10	3.38
After Cleveland eggs Arianna's house defending Donna's honor, he decides to seek revenge against everyone by pelting them with eggs — which lands him in prison for killing Mr. Waterman's sham wife, Lydia. Meanwhile, Rallo and Cleveland Jr. discover that Freight Train writes whodunit novels under a woman's name and become his students on how to write and solve a mystery, using Lydia Waterman's death as inspiration for a new book.
82	17	"The Fist and the Furious"	Anthony Agrusa	Jonathan Green & Gabe Miller	April 14, 2013	4APS15	2.50
Cleveland decides to make Dr. Fist one of his friends, but fears for his safety when he discovers Dr. Fist's mob association. Meanwhile, Rallo and Cleveland Jr. open a food truck business.
83	18	"Squirt's Honor"	Oreste Canestrelli	Daniel Dratch	April 21, 2013	4APS16	2.02
Donna demands that Rallo enlist in a Boy Scout-like organization, where he institutes a moneymaking scam. Later, Cleveland and Donna are raffle winners of a romantic hotel getaway but get carried away charging "incidentals" and are forced to work off their debt.
84	19	"Grave Danger"	Steve Robertson	Kirker Butler	April 28, 2013	4APS17	2.66
Rallo sees what life is like in the hood when he stays at Robert's apartment in East Stoolbend, but when Robert takes off for Baltimore and leaves him on his own, the youngster is left to buddy up with local toughs. Meanwhile, Holt buys cemetery plots for his friends and Cleveland, Lester, Holt, Tim, and Dr. Fist begin using the town graveyard as their new hangout.
85	20	"Of Lice and Men"	Jeff Myers	Story by : John Viener; Teleplay by : Kevin Biggins & Travis Bowe	May 12, 2013	4APS18	1.89
A lice outbreak at school means Rallo must lop off his beloved Afro, and when the other kids start making fun of him, Junior has his back. Meanwhile, Cleveland house-sits at Freight Train and Cookie's, where things take a bad turn after his pals show up.
86	21	"Mr. & Mrs. Brown"	Steve Robertson	Kevin Biggins & Travis Bowe	May 12, 2013	4APS01	2.26
Donna is incensed when Cleveland and his mom are mistaken for husband and wife on a visit to a retirement home. Meanwhile, Rallo rips off a candy bar from a vendor, and then tries to get Junior to take the rap for the theft.
87	22	"Crazy Train"	Seung-Woo Cha	Chadd Gindin	May 19, 2013	4APS19	2.14
Dr. Fist tells Cleveland that Freight Train's newfound kindness to his son may be a sign of dementia.
88	23	"Wheel! Of! Family!"	Jack Perkins	Margee Magee, Angeli Millan & Courtney Lilly	May 19, 2013	4APS20	2.43
Donna and Cleveland try to fix the kids' hectic schedules, while Cleveland Jr. finds his pole-dancing talent. Cleveland later finds out that Robert and Dee-Dee have become an item, and they adopt and raise a child.

== Home media ==
The Complete Season Four
Set Details
23 episodes; 3-disc set; Widescreen; Languages: English only (no subtitles); Uncensored audio; Note: In Region 1 the collection was manufactured on demand (MOD), releasing on DVD-R only.
Release Dates
Region 1	Region 2/4
December 17, 2013	-
