= Facing the Flag =

1896 novel by Jules Verne

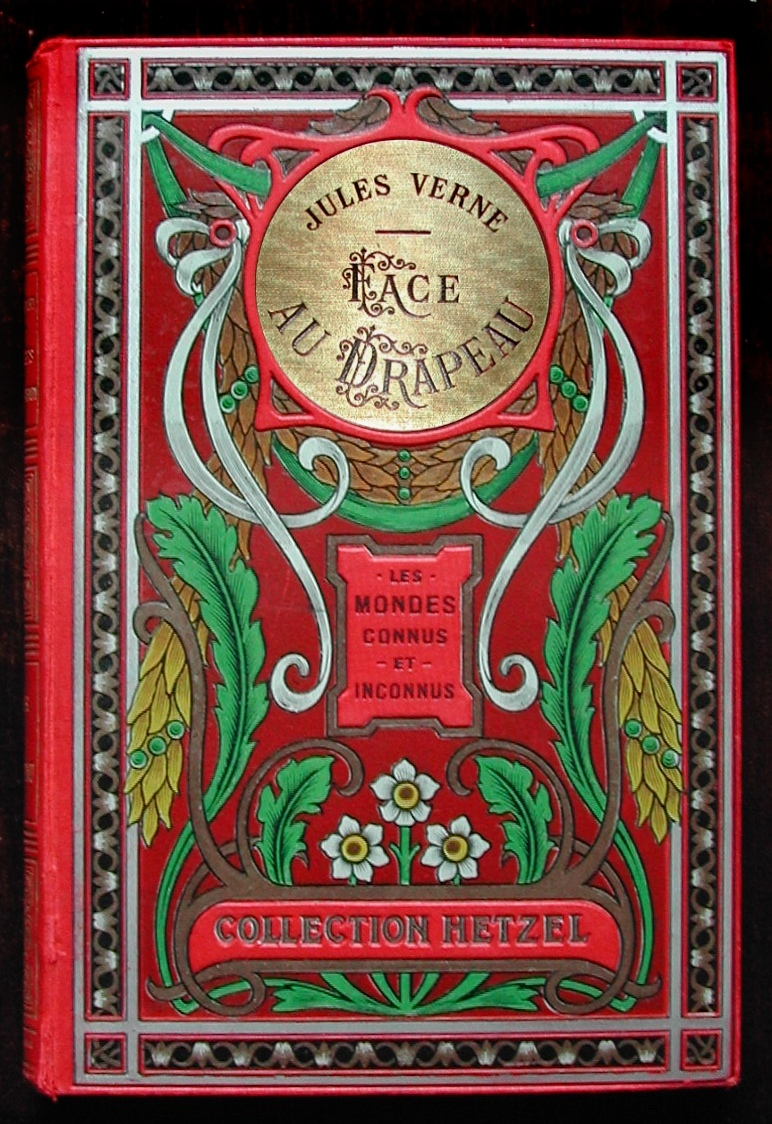
- Author: Jules Verne
- Original title: Face au drapeau
- Translator: Cashel Hoey
- Illustrator: Léon Benett
- Language: French
- Series: The Extraordinary Voyages #42
- Genre: Adventure novel, Science fiction
- Publisher: Pierre-Jules Hetzel
- Publication date: 1896
- Publication place: France
- English publication date: 1897
- Media type: Print (Hardback)
- Preceded by: Propeller Island
- Followed by: Clovis Dardentor

Facing the Flag or For the Flag (French: Face au drapeau) is an 1896 patriotic novel by Jules Verne. The book is part of the Voyages extraordinaires series.

Like The Begum's Millions, which Verne published in 1879, it has the theme of France and the entire world threatened by a super-weapon with the threat finally overcome through the force of French patriotism.

== Plot ==
Thomas Roch, a French inventor, has designed (but has not yet built) the Fulgurator, a weapon described to be so powerful that "the state which acquired it would become absolute master of earth and ocean." The weapon is powerful enough that (as we see later in the book) a shell shot from the Fulgurator need not hit the target at all— the vibrations in the air when the shell passes over a ship are enough to break the ship into pieces.

However, when Roch attempts to sell his design, no one believes his weapon can really work. He first tries to sell it to the French government, asking for a lot of money, and is turned down. He then tries Britain and United States. Unable to sell his unproven idea, Roch becomes bitter, megalomaniacal, and paranoid. The United States Government finally reacts by tucking him away at a luxurious asylum in New Bern, North Carolina, where he is visited by Ker Karraje, a notorious pirate of Malagasy origin.

Karraje and his men kidnap Roch and his attendant Gaydon from the asylum and bring him to their hide-out, the island of Back Cup in Bermuda. Here a wide cavern, accessible only by submerged submarine, has been made into a well-equipped pirate base. It is revealed that Gaydon is actually Simon Hart, a French engineer and explosives expert sent to spy on Roch and gain his confidence. Roch begins constructing his fearsome weapon, happily unaware that he is nothing but a glorified prisoner in the pirate's hands.

Hart succeeds in secretly sending out a message in a metal keg, giving the full details of Karraje's operations and his impending acquisition of the Fulgurator. The message gets through to the British authorities at their nearby naval base in Bermuda, and they send a submarine, HMS Sword, to find Hart. The submarine's crew makes contact with Hart, and take him and Roch on board, but the Sword is discovered, attacked, and sunk by the pirates. The unconscious Hart and Roch are extracted from the sunken British sub by pirate divers, leaving the entire British crew to perish. Hart manages to avoid suspicions of his actions.

Meanwhile, Roch's weapon is completed and becomes operational. Roch has no compunction in using it on British or American ships, and easily destroys the first cruiser to approach the island, with only a handful of its crew surviving. Next, a ship arrives from France, but Roch refuses to fire on his own country's ship. He struggles with the pirates, who try to seize the Fulgurator. During the struggle, Roch blows up himself, his weapon, and the pirates, along with the entire island. The single survivor of the cataclysm is Simon Hart, whose unconscious body with the diary at his side is found by the landing French sailors. Hart is eventually revived, to be amply rewarded for his dedication to his country.

== Response ==
Following publication of the book, Verne was sued by the chemist Eugène Turpin, inventor of the explosive Melinite, who recognized himself in the character of Roch and was not amused. Turpin had tried to sell his invention to the French government, which in 1885 refused it, though later purchasing it (it was extensively used in the First World War); but Turpin had never gone mad, nor did he ever offer his invention to any but the Government of France, so he had some justified grievance. Verne was successfully defended by Raymond Poincaré, later president of France. A letter to Verne's brother Paul seems to suggest, however, that after all Turpin was indeed the model for Roch. The character of Roch and his revolutionary powerful explosive might also have been inspired by the real-life Alfred Nobel who invented dynamite and later reportedly regretted having introduced such a destructive force into the world.

== Politics ==
The book was written and published when France was in the throes of the Dreyfus Affair, Frenchmen were deeply divided over whether or not the Jewish officer Alfred Dreyfus was guilty of treason and espionage on behalf of the hated Germany (and over more fundamental issues bound up with the Dreyfus case). The question whether or not Verne was an anti-semite is hotly debated; while Walter A. McDougall finds "no overt evidence of anti-Semitism on Verne's part," Brian Taves and Jean-Michel Margot note that his Off on a Comet contains "unflattering Shylock-style stereotypes." By 1899 Verne still identified himself as an anti-Dreyfusard.

== Legacy ==
Verne can be considered to have anticipated some of the political and ethical issues which would come to the fore after 1945, with the advent of nuclear arms

Film historian Thomas C. Renzi considers Roch the archetype of the "mad scientist," the thriller fiction stock character of a monomaniac whose warped genius endangers the world. If so, much of 20th-century thriller fiction, including such films as Thunderball and Barbarella, may be considered direct descendants of Facing the Flag.

In 1958, Czech director Karel Zeman used the novel as the basis for his 1958 film Vynález zkázy (a.k.a. The Deadly Invention and The Fabulous World of Jules Verne). The film, which made considerable use of the steel engravings in the original editions of Verne's novels, won the Grand Prix at the International Film Festival at Expo 58 in Brussels.

In 2012 French comics artist Goux adapted the novel into a comic book, Le Fulgurateur Roch.
