= Case of the Missing Hare =

1942 film by Charles M. Jones

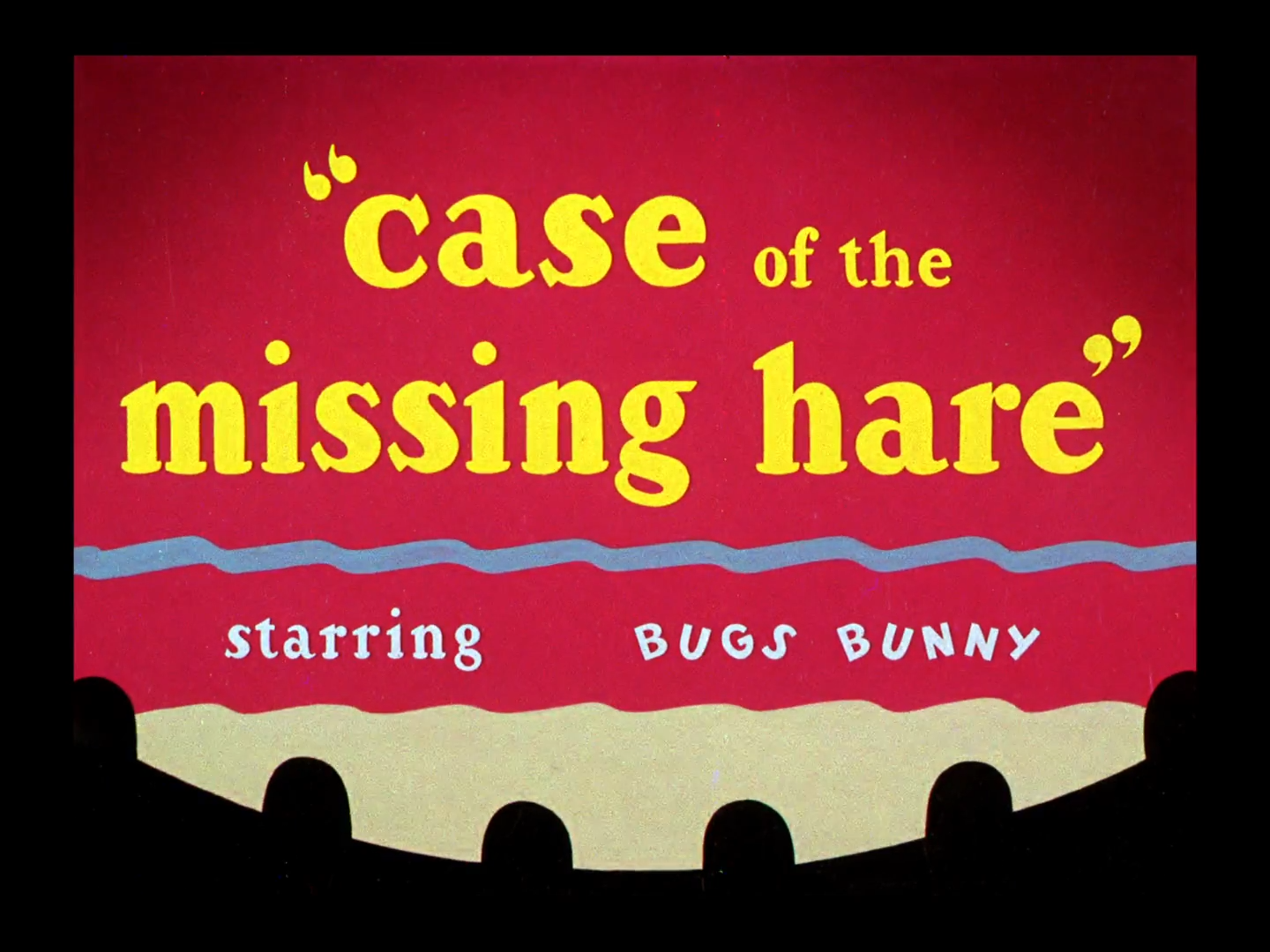
- Title card
- Directed by: Charles M. Jones
- Story by: Ted Pierce
- Produced by: Leon Schlesinger
- Music by: Carl W. Stalling
- Animation by: Ken Harris
- Color process: Technicolor
- Production company: Leon Schlesinger Productions
- Distributed by: Warner Bros. Pictures
- Release date: December 12, 1942
- Running time: 8 min
- Country: United States
- Language: English

Case of the Missing Hare is a 1942 American animated comedy short film directed by Charles M. Jones. The short was released on December 12, 1942. It is part of the Merrie Melodies series and the eighteenth cartoon to star Bugs Bunny.

== Plot ==
A bald magician named Ala Bahma nails self-promoting posters everywhere, including a tree in which Bugs is living. Bugs protests having his home encroached and his right to private property compromised, until the magician apologizes and offers Bugs a blackberry pie. Ala Bahma magically brandishes the pie from underneath his cloth and splatters it in Bugs' face, prompting Bugs to vow revenge.

On the evening of Ala Bahma's event, Bugs disrupts his performance with a series of public humiliations: replacing himself with a carrot, repeating Ala Bahma's hat-trick, and grabbing another carrot after hitting Ala Bahma with his own mallet. Eventually, the magician barricades his own hat with wood planks and nails to prevent Bugs from escaping.

Later, Bugs poses as a volunteer for Ala Bahma's Indian basket trick, where he puts the swords in the basket. When Ala Bahma discovers that Bugs has snuck out from behind him while feigning pain, Bugs tries jumping into his hat but hits it on the barricade. Ala Bahma charges at Bugs to kill him, but Bugs plays a statues game on the magician. Once Ala Bahma gets close enough, Bugs dresses up as a fencer for Ala Bahma to fight him. Bugs escapes to the balcony to heckle Ala Bahma ("What a performance, D'Artagnan, what a performance!"), which prompts him to fire a shotgun at Bugs. However, Bugs swiftly places an explosive cigar in Ala Bahma's mouth and it explodes on the magician, and soon afterwards Bugs splatters the pie in his face. Satisfied, Bugs then performs "Aloha 'Oe" on a ukulele as he descends into the hat.

== Production notes ==
This is one of the few cartoons where Bugs Bunny does not say his catchphrase, "What's up, Doc?", though he does address the magician as "Doc" early in the film. It is also one of few cartoons in the character's filmography to fall into the public domain in the early 1970s due to the failure of the last copyright holder, United Artists Television, to renew the original copyright within the allotted 28-year period. However, elements of the short, including Bugs, remain under copyright until 2036.

Background artists Gene Fleury and John McGrew reduced most of the backgrounds to the film to patterns (stripes, zig-zags, etc.) and colored cards. The result was outlandish but Fleury recalled Leon Schlesinger congratulating them. In the theater setting of the film, these backgrounds could be rationalized to represent stage flats.

Michael S. Shull and David E. Wilt consider it ambiguous if this cartoon contained a World War II–related reference. Bugs Bunny pronounces the phrase "Of course you realize, this means war" in a gruff voice that may have been intended as an imitation of Winston Churchill, though it was also used several times in Duck Soup.

== Home media ==
The short was released on disc 1 of the Looney Tunes Golden Collection: Volume 3 DVD set, and on disc 2 of the Looney Tunes Collector's Vault: Volume 3 Blu-ray set.

== See also ==
- Bugs Bunny filmography
- List of animated films in the public domain in the United States
- Looney Tunes and Merrie Melodies filmography (1940-1949)

== Sources ==
- Barrier, Michael (1999), "Warner Bros., 1941-1945", Hollywood Cartoons: American Animation in Its Golden Age, Oxford University Press, ISBN 978-0199839223
- Shull, Michael S.; Wilt, David E. (2004), "Appendix E.", Doing Their Bit: Wartime American Animated Short Films, 1939-1945, McFarland & Company, ISBN 978-0786481699

| Preceded by The Hare-Brained Hypnotist | Bugs Bunny Cartoons; 1942 | Succeeded by Tortoise Wins by a Hare |
