= Tank Brigade =

1955 film

- Directed by: Ivo Toman
- Screenplay by: Jaroslav Klima
- Starring: Otomar Krejča; Bedřich Prokoš; Martin Růžek; Július Pántik; Jana Dítětová; Ota Sklenčka; Zdeněk Dítě; Jiří Sovák; Jiri Vala; Miloslav Holub
- Cinematography: Jan Čuřík
- Production company: Československý Armádní Film
- Release date: 1955
- Running time: 93min
- Country: Czechoslovakia
- Languages: Czech, Russian

Tank Brigade (Czech: Tanková brigáda) is a 1955 Czechoslovak film made about the World War II Eastern Front conflict between German and Czechoslovak forces. The film is set in 1944 and follows Czechoslovak tank brigade during Battle of Ostrava.

The film is largely a propaganda film, depicting actions of the 1st Czechoslovak Independent Tank Armoured Brigade, with Soviet forces, who both fought their way to the Czechoslovak border, and participated in the Battle of the Dukla Pass. The film depicts the struggle for Slovakia and the successful liberation of Ostrava in Northern Moravia. The film was shot in Ostrava; one scene depicts a battle for the Miloš Sýkora bridge in Ostrava city, featuring the actual bridge. Three thousand members of the Czechoslovak People's Army participated in the film.

Crew that worked on film included many significant people of Czech cinematography such as cinematographer Jan Čuřík or director František Vláčil who helped with tank battles. The film is 93 minutes, in colour, and stars Otomar Krejča, Bedřich Prokoš, Martin Růžek, Július Pántik, Jana Dítětová, Ota Sklenčka, Zdeněk Dítě, Jiří Sovák, Rudolf Deyl ml., Jiri Vala, Miloslav Holub, Miloš Nedbal, Antonin Sura.

The screenplay was written by Jaroslav Klima, directed by Ivo Toman and produced by Československý Armádní Film.

Unusual for war films, it used a variety of authentic armoured vehicles used by both sides, including Russian T-34 and T-34/85s, as well as German Sturmgeschütz III, Panzer IV and a Schwimmwagen.
