= A Jester's Tale =

- Original poster
- Directed by: Karel Zeman
- Written by: Karel Zeman; Pavel Juráček
- Produced by: Josef Ouzký
- Starring: Petr Kostka; Miloslav Holub; Emília Vášáryová
- Cinematography: Václav Huňka
- Edited by: Miroslav Hájek
- Music by: Jan Novák
- Production company: Filmové studio Barrandov
- Release date: 18 December 1964
- Running time: 81 minutes
- Country: Czechoslovakia
- Language: Czech
- Budget: 5 Million KČs

A Jester's Tale (Czech: Bláznova kronika) is a 1964 Czech film directed by Karel Zeman. Described by Zeman as a "pseudo-historical" film, it is an anti-war black comedy set during the Thirty Years' War. The film combines live action with animation to suggest the artistic style of the engraver Matthäus Merian.

== Cast ==
- Petr Kostka as Petr
- Miloslav Holub as Recruiting officer Matyáš of Babice
- Emília Vášáryová as Lenka
- Valentina Thielová as Countess Veronika
- Karel Effa as Hetman Varga of Koňousov
- Eva Šenková as Countess
- Eduard Kohout as Count
- Vladimír Menšík as Court painter
- Čestmír Řanda as Watchman
- Jiří Holý as Spanish officer
- Josef Haukvic as Musketeer
- František Kovářík as Jester

== Reception ==
The film was a notable success at the 1964 San Francisco International Film Festival, winning Best Picture and Best Director. It was also voted Best Film at the 1964 Addis Ababa IFF in Ethiopia, and was honored in three categories at Cannes.
