= Július Pántik =

Slovak actor

- Born: 15 January 1922; Stredné Plachtince, Czechoslovakia (now Slovakia)
- Died: 25 August 2002 (aged 80); Bratislava, Slovakia
- Occupation: Actor
- Years active: 1947–1992

Július Pántik (15 January 1922 – 25 August 2002) was a Slovak film actor. He appeared in over 30 films between 1947 and 1992.

== Selected filmography ==
- Warning (1946)
- White Darkness (1948)
- Tank Brigade (1955)
- Kdo hledá zlaté dno (1974)
