= Ricardo Schnetzer =

Brazilian actor (1953–2026)

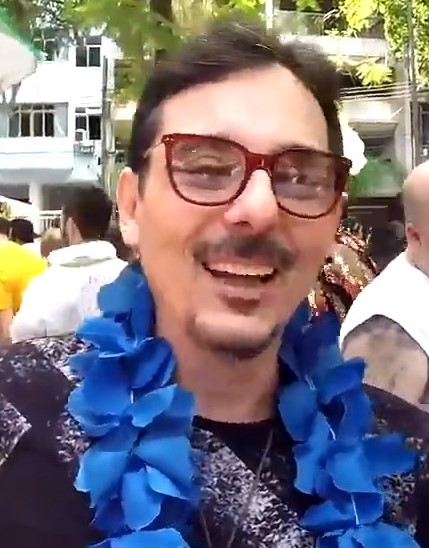
Schnetzer in 2018

Ricardo Luiz Guimarães Schnetzer (April 13, 1953 – February 4, 2026) was a Brazilian voice actor.

== Life and career ==
Schnetzer was born in Rio de Janeiro on April 13, 1953. He began working in dubbing in 1975. He was known for voicing actors Al Pacino, Nicolas Cage, Tom Cruise, Richard Gere, John Cusack, John Turturro, Daniel Day-Lewis, Kurt Russell, and Patrick Swayze.

In 2016, he participated in the radio soap opera Herança de Ódio based on the telenovela Êta Mundo Bom!, on TV Globo.

In January 2026, Schnetzer announced that he had been diagnosed with amyotrophic lateral sclerosis the previous year and asked for help from his followers to pay for the treatment through donations. He died on February 4, 2026, at the age of 72.
