= Turkey Pot Die =

- The Cleveland Show episode
- Episode no.: Season 4 Episode 4
- Directed by: Anthony Agrusa
- Written by: Dave Jeser; Matt Silverstein
- Production code: 4APS06
- Original air date: November 25, 2012

Guest appearance
- Tim Gunn as himself

Episode chronology
← Previous "A General Thanksgiving Episode"	Next → "A Vas Deferens Between Men & Women"
- The Cleveland Show season 4

"Turkey Pot Die" is the fourth episode of the fourth season of the animated comedy series The Cleveland Show. The 69th episode overall, it originally aired on Fox on November 25, 2012.

The episode was written by Dave Jeser and Matt Silverstein and directed by Anthony Agrusa. It was viewed by approximately 4.3 million viewers in its original airing. The episode features guest performance by Tim Gunn, along with several recurring voice actors for the series.

== Plot ==
When Cleveland Brown takes Jr. out to pick out their Thanksgiving turkey, Jr. refuses to shoot the bird. Back at The Broken Stool, the guys tease Cleveland for his son's lack of manhood. Cleveland tricks Jr. into going back out to the farm but he refuses to fall for it and will not shoot the turkey. Cleveland decides to do it himself but his confrontation results in him being shot. After waking up in the hospital, Cleveland now knows how it feels to have been shot and decides to help Jr. free the turkeys. The two go on a spree, protesting and attacking people getting ready for their own Thanksgiving. As they protest at Lester's Turkey Hunt, Lester points out that they annoyed everyone so much that the turkeys are all set to be slaughtered Thanksgiving Day. That night they break into the turkey hunt intending to free them all and take them to the Goochland turkey preserve. In order to lead the turkey's out, Jr. pretends to be a turkey and talks the flock into following him. With the help of some of the town, they get the turkeys to their garage to hide out until they can sneak them to Goochland.

Meanwhile, Rallo Tubbs and a reluctant Donna sign up to make a float for the Stoolbend Thanksgiving Parade. As Rallo starts to work on the float, Arianna's snide attitude changes Donna's and she jumps into the float building as well. But Rallo's avant-garde design ideas conflict with Donna's traditional ideas. When she finally gets the float to her liking, Rallo enlists his friends to trash the float.

When Donna sees what happened she confronts Rallo. As Cleveland and Jr. try to figure out a way past Lester, they see the float and Jr. stuffs the turkeys inside while Cleveland distracts Lester by flashing. As Donna tries to get supplies to fix up the float to Rallo's liking, he sees it leave with Cleveland and Jr. and figures he's been double-crossed by Donna and rushes to the parade. Lester and Kendra give pursuit and Rallo climbs a parade balloon for a better vantage point to find his float. Donna sees Rallo riding on top of the balloon and panics. As everyone tries to catch up, Lester starts shooting at the birds as they run out of the float. Rallo sees that Donna brought the art supplies but one of Lester's stray shots sends the turkeys flying and they distract the balloon handlers causing the balloon that Rallo is riding to go flying towards power lines. Cleveland takes Lester's gun and shoots the balloon causing Rallo to fall and the turkeys help Rallo's rescue by forming a cushion for his landing and are pardoned by the Mayor. As Cleveland teases Jr. about their Christmas ham he admits he could easily kill a pig as well as a person.

== Production ==
The episode was written by Dave Jeser and Matt Silverstein and directed by Anthony Agrusa.

In addition to the regular cast, Tim Gunn guest starred in the episode. Recurring voice actors Bryan Cranston, Clarence Livingston, and John Slattery made minor appearances as well.

== Reception ==
In its original broadcast on November 25, 2012 on Fox, this episode was watched by 4.32 million U.S. viewers and acquired a 6.3/10 rating/share.

Simon Abrams of The A.V. Club gave the episode a negative review, saying "There are, however, brief moments when the episode’s creators prove that they can earn yuks at the expense of canned sitcom humor and bad movie clichés. Later in “Turkey Pot Die,” Cleveland and Junior try to liberate Lester's turkeys, but Lester catches on and gives chase. First, Junior looks in his passenger side mirror. Then there's a quick cut to Lester and his wife pursuing Cleveland. Then there's a crash zoom in on Cleveland, who has his head sticking out of the side of the car as he squints at Lester. It's not exactly a sophisticated visual cue, but it is proof that The Cleveland Show’s creators can infrequently be funny without trying too hard".

Jen Johnson of Den of Geek gave the episode a positive review, saying "As I have said, I am not a huge fan of this show...it did explore the issues of killing animals for food, and brought up the inconsistencies between species (turkey vs. pig), which I think is important...IF this show reaches a rather large audience. I still think the humor falls a bit flat and although there are attempts to make progress, I'm a bit surprised it's in its third season".
