= The Treasure of Bird Island =

- Poster
- Directed by: Karel Zeman
- Screenplay by: František Hrubín; E. F. Misek; Karel Zeman
- Cinematography: Antonín Horák
- Edited by: Zdenek Stehlík
- Music by: Zdeněk Liška
- Production company: Československý Státní Film
- Release date: 27 March 1953
- Running time: 77 minutes
- Country: Czechoslovakia
- Language: Czech

The Treasure of Bird Island (Czech: Poklad ptačího ostrova) is a 1953 Czechoslovak animated film directed by Karel Zeman in his feature length debut.

The film, based on a Persian fairy tale, was Zeman's first feature-length work. The soundtrack includes verses by František Hrubín, read by children, as well as an original film score by Zdeněk Liška.

The film's style is an experiment in combining two- and three-dimensional animation, including hand-drawn backgrounds and figures animated in relief. The production design is based on the traditional manuscript-illustration style of Persian miniatures.
