= On the Comet =

- Original Czech poster
- Directed by: Karel Zeman
- Written by: Karel Zeman; Jan Procházka
- Based on: Hector Servadac by Jules Verne
- Starring: Magda Vášáryová; Emil Horváth
- Cinematography: Rudolf Stahl
- Edited by: Josef Valušiak
- Music by: Luboš Fišer
- Production companies: Filmové studio Barrandov; Krátký film Praha; Studio Gottwaldov
- Distributed by: Ustredni pujcovna filmu Praze
- Release date: 9 October 1970
- Running time: 73 minutes
- Country: Czechoslovakia
- Language: Czech
- Budget: 7 Million KČs

Na kometě (literally On the Comet) is a 1970 Czech film directed by Karel Zeman, based on Jules Verne's 1877 novel Off on a Comet.

The film is a combination of animated and live action film. Animation is based on illustrations for Verne's novels. The story is presented in grotesque way, especially conflicts between British and French soldiers. Zeman added a romantic plot that includes Hector Servadac and Angelica.

== Plot ==
In a French colony of Northern Africa, Captain Hector Servadac works as a cartographer for the French army. He falls into the sea while mapping the area and is saved by the beautiful Angelica, a young woman on the run from Spanish captors. The Spaniards are helping the Arabian king, who is leading an uprising in the colony. While the French and Arabian army are preparing to battle, a comet touches Earth's surface and carries the territory away.

French, Spaniards and Arabians are trapped together on the comet, but are still intent on continuing to fight. Hector returns to his commander, who orders all non-French people arrested. This includes the Spaniards as well as Angelica's brothers, who, unaware of her escape, are trying to save her. Angelica herself is hidden away by shopkeepers in a town that was carried away with the soldiers. The Arabians, who lost their weapons during the comet's impact, are waiting for the opportunity to get armed. The colony is attacked by a group of dinosaurs, and the French general orders Hector to lead a counterattack. It is unsuccessful, and Hector has to run for his life.

He meets Angelica in the town, where she is helping shopkeepers pack their metal pots in a carriage. He tries to convince her to run away with him but the horses are scared by the noise of falling pots and run towards the dinosaurs. Hector tries to catch up with the carriage, but the dinosaurs run away when they hear the noise made by the pots. The French general, seeing the dinosaurs retreat, decides to replace his army's weapons with pots. The Arabians take advantage of this decision, stocking up on the weapons the French throw away. The Arabian army then attacks the French, but before they can defeat it, planet Mars appears in the sky. Both armies decide to stop the conflict, as they believe that the comet will hit the planet and that everyone will die in the impact. This prediction proves untrue as the comet misses Mars. Hector convinces them to keep the peace and start a new peaceful society on the comet.

Their happiness is interrupted by Angelica's brothers who, believing Hector is her kidnapper, ambush him. They kidnap Angelica and set off homeward, unaware that they have left Earth. The Spaniards offer their ship to save Angelica and Hector goes after her. During the sea voyage, the Spanish ship comes across what seems to be a coast. It is revealed to be a giant serpent. The Spaniards and Hector are shocked, but are able to scare it off with pots. They also come across an island full of prehistoric creatures, and witness life evolving from the sea. Hector eventually finds Angelica and they plan to get married. Earth appears in the sky during the wedding which leads everybody to return to their old conflicts. When the comet touches Earth, everybody starts fighting again. The French and Spaniards are defeated by Arabs, and Angelica is once again kidnapped by her brothers. Hector runs after them but falls to the sea. Hector wakes up on the coast, saved by his adjutant, who reveals that the adventure was all a dream.

== Cast ==
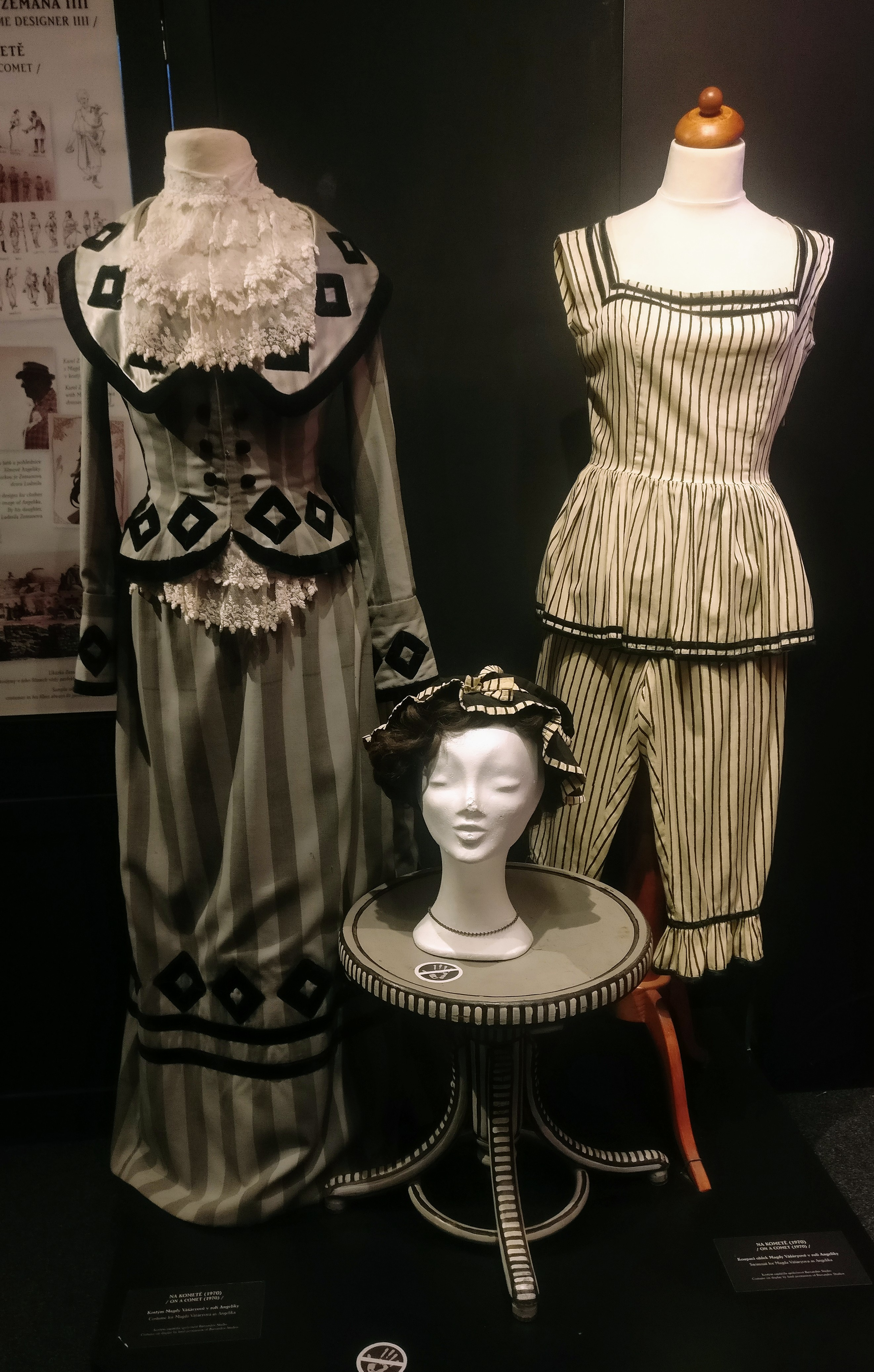
Costumes of Magda Vášáryová

- Magda Vášáryová as Angelika
- Emil Horváth as Lt. Servadac
- František Filipovský as Col. Picard
- Čestmír Řanda as Spanish consul
- Josef Větrovec as Sheikh
- Jiřina Jirásková as Ester
- Vladimír Menšík as Silberman
- Miloslav Holub as Hikmet
- Karel Effa as Cprl. Ben
- Josef Hlinomaz as Capt. Lacoste
- Jaroslav Mareš as Cprl. Lafitte
- Eduard Kohout as Murphy
- Zdena Bronislavská as Tavern dancer
- Steva Maršálek as Mahdi
- Karel Pavlík as Oliphant
- Jaroslav Štercl as Sailor with keys
- Jiří Lír as Cannoneer Ali
- Miloš Nesvatba as Husein
- Jan Bor as Luigi
- Pavel Libovický as Antonio
- Jaroslav Klouda as Pepino

== See also ==
- List of films featuring dinosaurs
- Valley of the Dragons (1961)
