= Mr. Prokouk =

Series of Czech puppet stop motion films by Karel Zeman

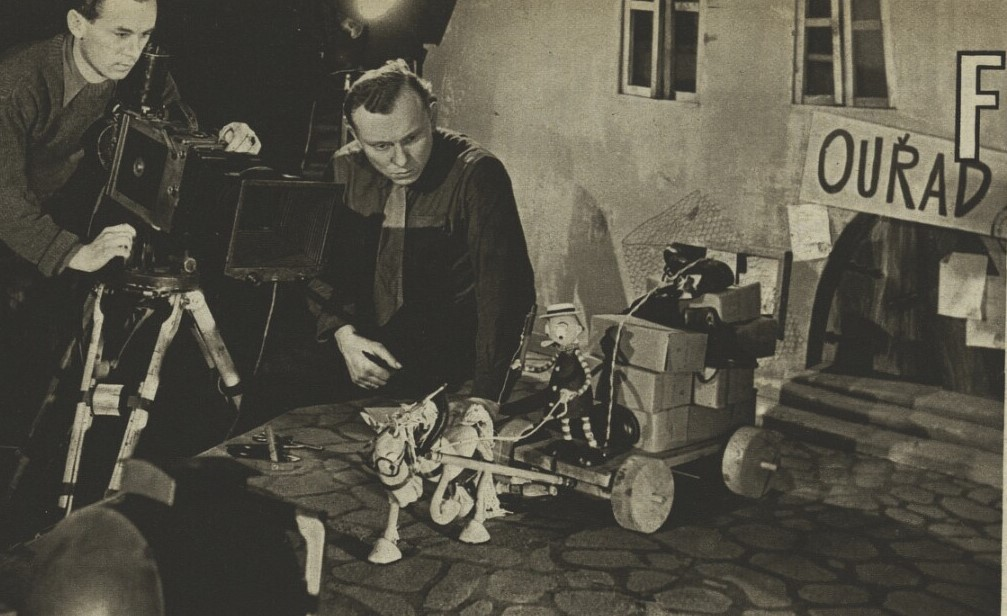
A film featuring Mr. Prokouk being shot in 1947.

Mr. Prokouk (Czech: Pan Prokouk) is a character created by Karel Zeman for a series of Czech animated short films in the 1940s and 1950s.

Prokouk, a stop-motion animation puppet made of wood, is a sympathetic, irrepressible everyman character with a bristling mustache, a long nose, and a pork pie hat. The French newspaper Le Monde described the character as an "animated cousin" of Jacques Tati's character Monsieur Hulot, and the catalogue of a 2001 Karel Zeman retrospective at the Berkeley Art Museum and Pacific Film Archive suggested that Prokouk might be taken as Zeman's alter ego. The short films in which he appears are comic with a didactic touch.

The character first appeared in the 1946 short Podkova pro štěstí ("Horseshoe for Luck").

Prokouk became the most well-known character in Czech animated cinema and a familiar figure in Czech culture. The films were especially popular with young audiences.

== Filmography ==
The following table is based on information from the Karel Zeman Museum's filmography.

Year	Czech title	English title
January 1, 1946	Pan Prokouk: Podkova pro štěstí	Mr. Prokouk: A Horseshoe for Luck
June 17, 1947	Pan Prokouk ouřaduje	Mr. Prokouk, The Office Clerk
September 1, 1947	Pan Prokouk v pokušení	Mr. Prokouk in Temptation
1947	Pan Prokouk na brigádě	Mr. Prokouk, The Volunteer
January 1, 1948	Pan Prokouk filmuje	Mr. Prokouk, The Filmmaker
July 23, 1949	Pan Prokouk vynálezcem	Mr. Prokouk, The Inventor
1955	Pan Prokouk, přítel zvířátek	Mr. Prokouk, The Animal Lover
August 28, 1957	Pan Prokouk detektivem	Mr. Prokouk, The Detective
1959	Pan Prokouk akrobatem	Mr. Prokouk, The Acrobat
