= Elmer Plummer =

American water colour painter

- Born: November 6, 1910
- Died: December 31, 1986 (aged 76)
- Occupation: Water color painter

Elmer Plummer (November 6, 1910 - December 31, 1986) was an American water color painter who was active and worked at Walt Disney Animation Studios and Warner Bros. Cartoons.

== Biography ==
Plummer was born in Redlands, California, in 1910 and attended military school in San Diego before receiving a scholarship to study at the Chouinard Art Institute, where he returned as a teacher in later life.

In 1934, he joined Warner Bros as a studio artist, then joined the Walt Disney Studios where he worked on such films as Fantasia and Dumbo.

He was also active in water colour painting for the Works Progress Administration and as a member of the Painters and Sculptors of Los Angeles. He exhibited works at the Art Institute of Chicago, the Golden Gate International Exposition, and won awards from the Los Angeles Art Association, the Pennsylvania Academy of the Fine Arts, and the Los Angeles County Fair, and California State Fair.

He retired to in Junction City, Oregon, where he died in 1986, at his age of 76.

== Filmography ==
Year	Title	Credits
1940	Fantasia	Story Development Artist - Segment "Toccata and Fugue in D Minor" / Character Designer - Segment "The Nutcracker Suite"
1941	Dumbo	Character Designer
1943	Victory Through Air Power (Documentary)	Art Director: Animation
1945	The Three Caballeros	Story
1946	Make Mine Music	Art Supervisor
1946	Song of the South	Art Treatment
1966 - 1968	The Magical World of Disney (TV Series)	Background Artist - 3 Episodes
