= Karel Zeman =

Czech filmmaker (1910–1989)

- Born: 3 November 1910; Ostroměř, Bohemia, Austria-Hungary
- Died: 5 April 1989 (aged 78); Gottwaldov, Czechoslovakia
- Occupations: Film director, animator
- Children: Ludmila Zeman
- Awards: 1970: National Artist; 1980: Order of the Republic

Karel Zeman (3 November 1910 – 5 April 1989) was a Czech film director, artist, production designer and animator. He is best known for directing fantasy films combining live-action footage with animation, including Journey to the Beginning of Time (1955) and Invention for Destruction (1958). Because of his creative use of special effects and animation in his films, he has often been called the "Czech Méliès".

== Life ==
Zeman was born on 3 November 1910 in Ostroměř, Bohemia, Austria-Hungary (present-day Czech Republic). At his parents' insistence, he studied business at high school in Kolín. In the 1920s, he studied at a French advertising school, and worked at an advertising studio in Marseille until 1936. It was in France that he first worked with animation, filming an ad for soap. He then returned to his home country (by now the First Czechoslovak Republic, known as Czechoslovakia), after visiting Egypt, Yugoslavia, and Greece. Back in Czechoslovakia, Zeman advertised for Czech firms like Baťa and Tatra. In 1939 he attempted to make an extended stay in Casablanca, but was barred by the Protectorate of Bohemia and Moravia established by Nazi Germany; unable to get the necessary papers in time, Zeman was required to remain in his home country during the German occupation of Czechoslovakia.

During the war he worked as a head of advertisement at Dům služeb in Brno. Film director Elmar Klos came to Brno to film a newsreel about window-dressing competition, which Zeman won. Klos offered Zeman a job at Zlín's animation studio. After some consideration (his wife and children were already established in Brno), Zeman accepted the job in 1943. At the studio, Zeman worked as an assistant to the pioneering animator Hermína Týrlová, and in 1945 he became the director of the stop-motion animation production group. The same year, in collaboration with Bořivoj Zeman, he made his first short film, Vánoční sen ("A Christmas Dream"). The short, which combined animated puppets with live-action footage, marked the beginning of Zeman's experiments with new techniques and genres.

Zeman then went on to solo work, including a series of satirical cartoon shorts starring a puppet called Mr. Prokouk; the series was a wide success and the character became a Czech favorite. A bet Zeman accepted, challenging him to discover a method of working with glass in animation, led to the unusual short Inspirace ("Inspiration," 1948), which tells a wordless, poetic love story using animated glass figurines. Zeman then went on to the half-hour film Král Lávra (1950), based on the satirical poem by Karel Havlíček Borovský; the film won a National Award. In 1952, Zeman completed his first feature film, Poklad ptačího ostrova ("The Treasure of Bird Island," 1952). It was based on a Persian fairy tale and took its visual inspiration from Persian paintings, combining multiple animation techniques in two- and three-dimensional space.

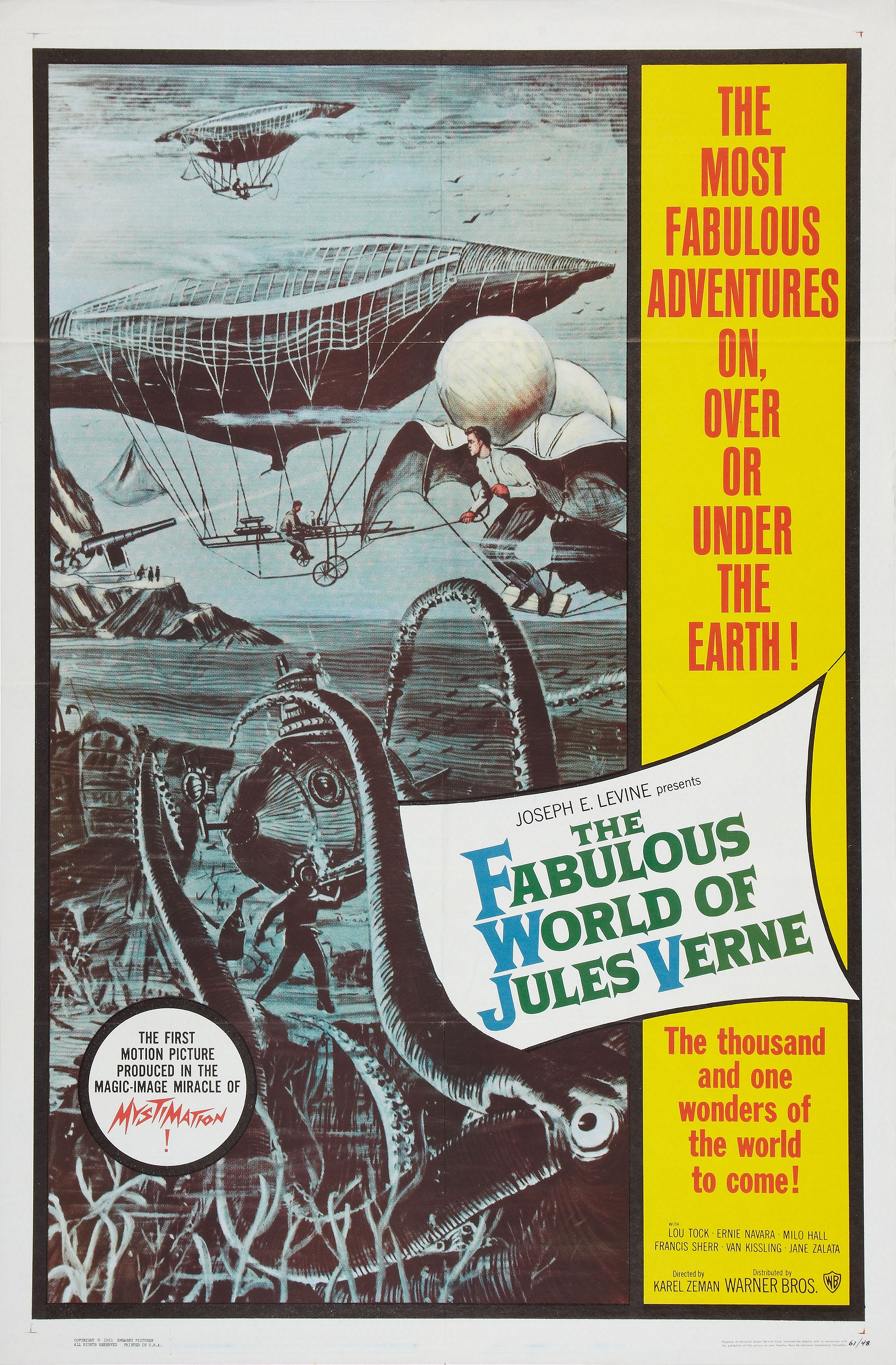
American poster for Zeman's Vynález zkázy

It was in 1955, however, that Zeman began the work for which he is best known: six feature films designed artistically to combine live-action and animation techniques. These were:

- Journey to the Beginning of Time (1955), inspired by Jules Verne's Journey to the Center of the Earth and the paintings of Zdeněk Burian. In 1966 a partly re-filmed US version was released as Journey to the Beginning of Time.
- Invention for Destruction (1958), based on Verne's Facing the Flag, and filmed to emulate the original illustrations for Verne's novels
- The Fabulous Baron Munchausen (1961), celebrating the legendary Baron Munchausen and the engravings of Gustave Doré
- A Jester's Tale (1964), a satire of the Thirty Years' War, suggested by the drawings of Matthäus Merian
- The Stolen Airship (1966), inspired by the Verne novels Two Years' Vacation and The Mysterious Island, the Art Nouveau style, and the 1891 Prague Centennial Exhibition
- On the Comet (1970), an anti-war fantasy based on Verne's Hector Servadac

He was a member of the jury at the 2nd Moscow International Film Festival in 1961 and at the 7th Moscow International Film Festival in 1971. The Czechoslovak government awarded him the title of National Artist in 1970.

After his live-action films, Zeman experimented with more classical forms of animation, beginning with seven shorts about Sinbad the Sailor which were then expanded into the feature film Adventures of Sinbad the Sailor (1974). His final films were Krabat – The Sorcerer's Apprentice (1977), from the novel The Satanic Mill by Otfried Preußler, and The Tale of John and Mary (1980). On 3 November 1980, in celebration of Zeman's seventieth birthday, President Gustáv Husák awarded him the Order of the Republic.

Zeman died in Gottwaldov (present-day Zlín) on 5 April 1989, a few months before the Velvet Revolution.

== Legacy ==
Zeman's works were influential to the Czech animator Jan Švankmajer, as well as to the filmmaker Terry Gilliam, who said of Zeman: "He did what I'm still trying to do, which is to try and combine live action with animation. His Doré-esque backgrounds were wonderful." The filmmaker Tim Burton described Zeman's creative process as "extremely inspirational" to his own work, and identified Zeman and the animator Ray Harryhausen as his influences "in terms of doing stop motion and a more handmade quality … Karel Zeman did that amazingly." Harryhausen himself also spoke in interviews of his admiration for Zeman, and the films of the director Wes Anderson have included homages to Zeman's works.

The film historian Georges Sadoul identified Zeman as having "widened the horizons of the eighth art, animation," adding:

He is justly considered Méliès's successor. He undoubtedly brings the old master to mind, not only because he is an artisan impassioned by art, creating his "innocent inventions" with infinite patience rather than with large budgets, but also because of his ingenuous and always ingenious fantasies. Less intellectual than Trnka, but nonetheless his equal, he has great zest and a marvelous sense of baroque oddities and poetic gags.

On the occasion of an animation exhibition in 2010, curators at the Barbican Centre said of Zeman: "although his influence outweighs his global fame, he is unarguably one of the greatest animators of all time."

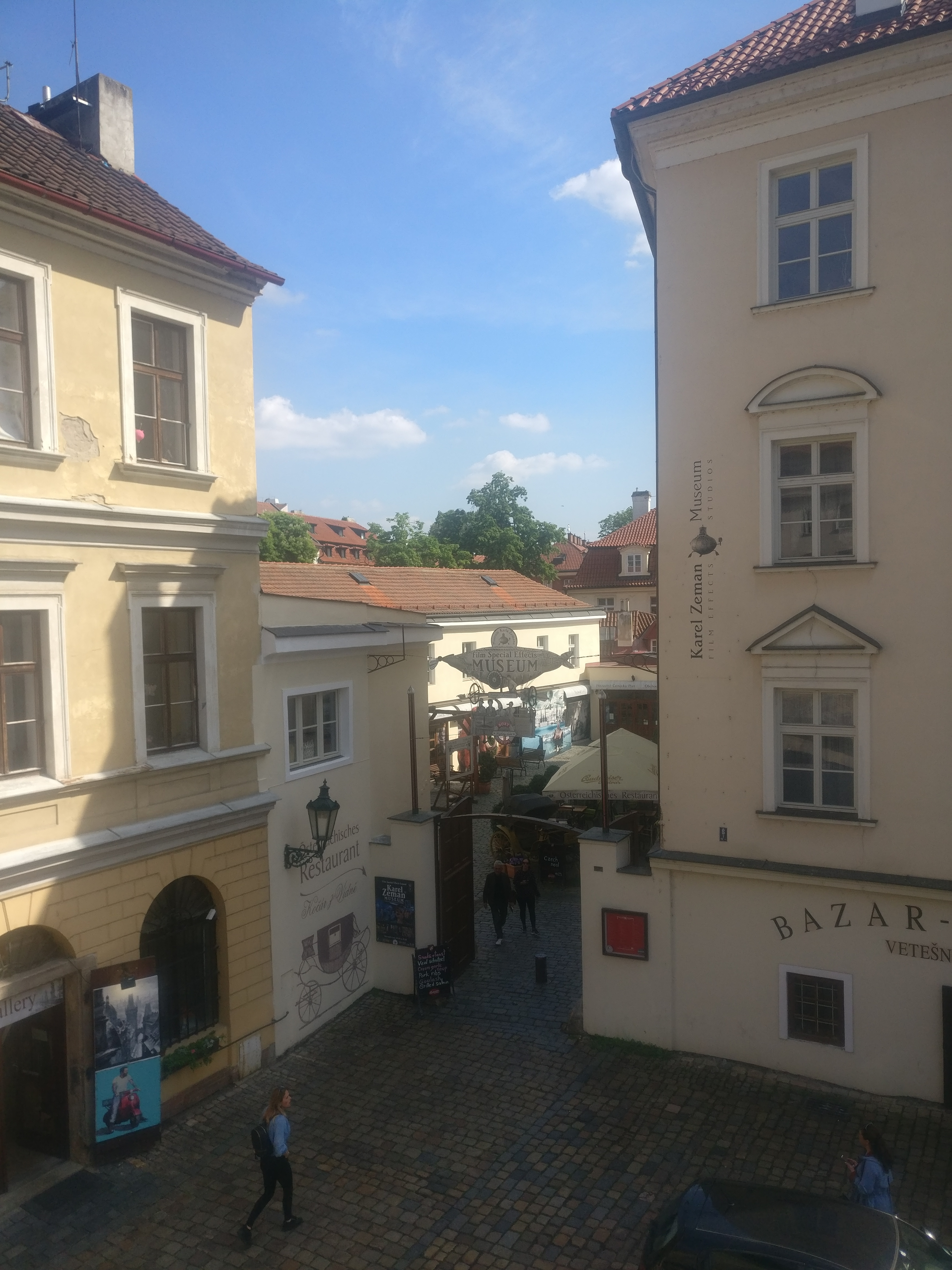
Entrance to the Karel Zeman museum

In 2012 a museum dedicated to Zeman and his work, the Muzeum Karla Zemana, opened near the Charles Bridge in Prague.

== Filmography ==
=== Feature films ===
Year	Original Czech title	Standard English title	US release title
1952	Poklad ptačího ostrova	The Treasure of Bird Island	N/A
1955	Cesta do pravěku	Journey to Prehistory	Journey to the Beginning of Time
1958	Vynález zkázy	Invention for Destruction	The Fabulous World of Jules Verne
1962	Baron Prášil	Baron Munchausen	The Fabulous Baron Munchausen
1964	Bláznova kronika	A Jester's Tale	War of the Fools
1967	Ukradená vzducholoď	The Stolen Airship	N/A
1970	Na kometě	On the Comet	On the Comet
1974	Pohádky tisíce a jedné noci	Tales of 1,001 Nights	Adventures of Sinbad the Sailor
1977	Čarodějův učeň	Krabat — The Sorcerer's Apprentice	N/A
1980	Pohádka o Honzíkovi a Mařence	The Tale of John and Mary	N/A

=== Short films ===
Year	Original Czech title	English title	Notes
1945	Vánoční sen	The Christmas Dream	Released in the US as A Christmas Dream
1946	Křeček	The Hamster	
1946	Podkova pro štěstí	Horseshoe for Luck	The first Mr. Prokouk film
1947	Pan Prokouk ouřaduje	Mr. Prokouk, Bureaucrat	
1947	Brigády	Voluntary Work	The third Mr. Prokouk film
1947	Pan Prokouk v pokušení	Mr. Prokouk in Temptation	
1948	Pan Prokouk filmuje	Mr. Prokouk Filming	
1948	Inspirace	Inspiration	
1949	Pan Prokouk vynálezcem	Mr. Prokouk, Inventor	
1950	Král Lávra	King Lávra	
1955	Pan Prokouk, Přítel zvířátek	Mr. Prokouk, Friend of the Animals	
1958	Pan Prokouk detektivem	Mr. Prokouk, Detective	Writer only; directed by Zdeněk Rozkopal
1959	Pan Prokouk akrobatem	Mr. Prokouk, Acrobat	Writer only; directed by Zdeněk Rozkopal
1971	Dobrodružství námořníka Sindibáda	Adventures of Sinbad the Sailor	
1972	Druhá cesta námořníka Sindibáda	The Second Voyage of Sinbad the Sailor	
1973	V zemi obrů. Třetí cesta námořníka Sindibáda	In the Land of Giants (the third voyage)	
1973	Magnetová hora. Čtvrtá cesta námořníka Sindibáda	The Magnet Mountain (the fourth voyage)	
1973	Létající koberec. Pátá cesta námořníka Sindibáda	The Flying Carpet (the fifth voyage)	
1974	Mořský sultán. Šestá cesta námořníka Sindibáda	The Sultan of the Sea (the sixth voyage)	
1974	Zkrocený démon. Sedmá cesta námořníka Sindibáda	Taming the Demon (the seventh voyage)	
