= List of Czech animated films =

This is a list of Czech animated films made in the Czech lands from 1927 to the present. After 1930, many Czech animated films were produced with sound, and after 1947 most were produced in color. The list is ordered by year of release.

Title	Director	Genre	Running time	Notes
1927
Nové dobrodružství Kocoura Felixe	Karel Dodal	Advertising film	2 Minutes	
Poučení kocoura Felixe	Karel Dodal	Advertising film	1 Minute	
1928
Zamilovaný vodník	Hermína Týrlová	Grotesque	11 Minutes	
1929
Plavčíkem na slané vodě	Karel Dodal	Advertising film	9 Minutes	
1930
Bimbovo smutné dobrodružství	Karel Dodal	Family film	10 Minutes	
1934
Záhada mezníku MK 204	Karel Dodal	Advertising film	4 Minutes	
1944
Wedding in the Coral Sea	Horst von Möllendorff, Jiří Brdečka, Jaroslav Kándl, Eduard Hofman, Břetislav Pojar, Václav Bedřich, Stanislav Látal, Jaroslav Doubrava, Josef Kluge	Family Film	11 Minutes	The first Czech Cartoon film.
1945
A Christmas Dream	Karel Zeman	Family Film	11 Minutes	
My grandfather planted a beet	Jiří Trnka	Fairy Tale	10 Minutes	
1946
Animals and bandits	Jiří Trnka	Fairy Tale	8 Minutes	Based on Grimms' Fairy Tales
The Gift	Jiří Trnka	Comedy	15 Minutes	
The Hamster	Karel Zeman	Family Film	8 Minutes	
Springman and the SS	Jiří Trnka	War Comedy	14 Minutes	
1947
Betlém	Jiří Trnka	Family Film	10 Minutes	
The Czech Year	Jiří Trnka	Family Film	75 Minutes	The first full-length film by Trnka
Legenda o sv. Prokopu	Jiří Trnka	Fantasy	10 Minutes	
1948
1949
The Devil's Mill	Jiří Trnka	Fairy Tale	21 Minutes	
The Emperor's Nightingale	Jiří Trnka	Fairy Tale	72 Minutes	
Story of the Bass Cello	Jiří Trnka	Romantic	13 Minutes	Based on a story by Andrey Chokhov
Song of the Prairie	Jiří Trnka	Western	23 Minutes	
1950
Prince Bayaya	Jiří Trnka	Fairy Tale	72 Minutes	Won Golden Leopard in 1954.
1951
The Golden Fish	Jiří Trnka	Fairy Tale	16 Minutes	
The Merry Circus	Jiří Trnka	Family Film	12 Minutes	
Perníková chaloupka	Břetislav Pojar	Fairy Tale	17 Minutes	
1952
1953
Jak stařeček měnil, až vyměnil	Jiří Trnka	Fairy Tale	9 Minutes	
Old Czech Legends	Jiří Trnka	Fantasy film	91 Minutes	
Veselý kolotoc	Břetislav Pojar	Family film		
1954
Dva Mrazíci	Jiří Trnka	Fairy Tale	12 Minutes	
The Good Soldier Schweik	Jiří Trnka	Comedy	76 Minutes	Based on a book by Jaroslav Hašek
Kuťásek a Kutilka	Jiří Trnka	Fairy Tale	18 Minutes	
O sklenicku víc	Břetislav Pojar	Drama	20 Minutes	
1955
Cirkus Hurvínek	Jiří Trnka	Family Film	24 Minutes	
1956
Spejbl on the Track	Břetislav Pojar	Family film	21 Minutes	
1957
The Little Umbrella	Břetislav Pojar	Family film	15 Minutes	
1958
Why is the UNESCO	Jiří Trnka	Comedy	108 Minutes	
1959
Bomb-Manie	Břetislav Pojar	Grotesque	11 Minutes	
Glory	Břetislav Pojar	Comedy	13 Minutes	
How to Furnish an Apartment	Břetislav Pojar			
The Lion and the Song	Břetislav Pojar	Drama	14 Minutes	
A Midsummer Night's Dream	Jiří Trnka	Romantic Comedy	76 Minutes	Based on the Shakespeare play of the same name.
1960
The Midnight Adventure	Jiří Trnka, Břetislav Pojar	Family film	13 Minutes	
On a Cat's Word	Břetislav Pojar	Family film	16 Minutes	
Painting Is for the Cats	Břetislav Pojar	Family film	14 Minutes	
1961
School for Cats	Břetislav Pojar	Family film	15 Minutes	
1962
The Cybernetic Grandma	Jiří Trnka	Science Fiction, Horror	29 Minutes	
Jaro	Jiří Trnka	Poetic	11 Minutes	
Passion	Jiří Trnka	Drama	8 Minutes	
1963
1964
The Archangel Gabriel and Ms Goose	Jiří Trnka	Comedy	29 Minutes	
The Last Trick	Jan Švankmajer	Fantasy Film	12 Minutes	
Proměny	Václav Mergl	Drama	4 Minutes	The first Czech film that uses Clay Animation.
1965
A Game with Stones	Jan Švankmajer		9 Minutes	
The Hand	Jiří Trnka	Drama	18 Minutes	Declared by American Film Academy the 5th best animated picture in history
Johann Sebastian Bach: Fantasy in G minor	Jan Švankmajer	Music film	9 Minutes	
1966
Et Cetera	Jan Švankmajer	Drama	8 Minutes	
Punch and Judy	Jan Švankmajer	Drama	10 Minutes	
Studie doteku	Václav Mergl		1 Minute	
1967
Historia Naturae (Suita)	Jan Švankmajer	Historical	9 Minutes	
1968
The Flat	Jan Švankmajer	Fantasy	13 Minutes	
The Garden	Jan Švankmajer	Mysterious Comedy	17 Minutes	
Picknick with Weismann	Jan Švankmajer	Drama	11 Minutes	
1969
A Quiet Week in the House	Jan Švankmajer	Drama	20 Minutes	
1970
Don Juan	Jan Švankmajer	Drama	30 Minutes	
Laokoon	Václav Mergl	Science Fiction, Horror	11 Minutes	
1971
Jabberwocky	Jan Švankmajer	Fantasy	14 Minutes	
1972
Leonardo's Diary	Jan Švankmajer	Drama	12 Minutes	
1973
Fantastic Planet	René Laloux	Science fiction	72 Minutes	International production with France
1974
1975
1976
Krabi	Václav Mergl	Science Fiction, Horror	11 Minutes	Based on Anatoly Dneprov's story "Crabs on the Island"
1977
Castle of Otranto	Jan Švankmajer	Fantasy	15 Minutes	
1978
Krabat – The Sorcerer's Apprentice	Karel Zeman	Dark Fantasy	73 Minutes	
1979
1980
The Fall of the House of Usher	Jan Švankmajer	Horror	15 Minutes	
The Tale of John and Mary	Karel Zeman	Fantasy	64 Minutes	Zeman's last film
1981
1982
Dimensions of Dialogue	Jan Švankmajer	Drama	14 Minutes	
The Vanished World of Gloves	Jiří Barta	Multi Genre	17 Minutes	
1983
The Pendulum, the Pit and Hope	Jan Švankmajer	Horror	15 Minutes	
1984
Homunkulus	Václav Mergl	Drama	11 Minutes	
1985
1986
Mikrob	Václav Mergl	War film	16 Minutes	
The Pied Piper	Jiří Barta	Horror	53 Minutes	An adaptation of the Pied Piper of Hamelin
1987
1988
Alice	Jan Švankmajer	Fantasy film	84 Minutes	Adaptation of Alice In Wonderland
Cousins	Václav Mergl	Horror	7 Minutes	
Virile Games	Jan Švankmajer	Sport comedy	14 Minutes	
1989
The Club of the Laid Off	Jiří Barta	Drama	24 Minutes	
Darkness/Light/Darkness	Jan Švankmajer	Drama	6 Minutes	
Flora	Jan Švankmajer	Drama	30 seconds	
1990
Haló, Alberte	Václav Mergl	Science Fiction	8 Minutes	
1991
1992
Food	Jan Švankmajer	Drama	17 Minutes	
1993
1994
Faust	Jan Švankmajer	Horror	97 Minutes	Inspired by Faustus Legend.
1995
1996
Conspirators of Pleasure	Jan Švankmajer	Horror	85 Minutes	
1997
1998
1999
2000
Little Otik	Jan Švankmajer	Horror	132 minutes	
2001
2002
Báječná show	Vladimír Mráz	Musical	72 minutes	
2003
2006
Thaumaturgic Miniworld	Štěpán Batoušek	Fantasy	4 Minutes	Based on a poem by T. R. Field
Ltd.	Aleš Pachner	Drama	6 Minutes	
2005
Lunacy	Jan Švankmajer	Horror	118 minutes	
The Torchbearer	Václav Švankmajer	Dark Fantasy	25 minutes	
2006
2007
Cook, Mug, Cook!	Jiří Barta	Drama	7 Minutes	
I Am Bigger and Better	Martin Duda	Sci-Fi	17 Minutes	
Mrs. G	Michal Žabka	Romance	12 Minutes	
One Night in One City	Jan Balej	Horror	75 Minutes	
2008
The Clod	Jaromír Plachý	Comedy	2 Minutes	
Goat Story	Jan Tománek	Comedy	80 minutes	
2009
Absurp	Matyáš Trnka	Drama	6 Minutes	
On the Branch	Jaromír Plachý	Comedy	2 Minutes	
Nokturno	Marek Berger	Action	7 Minutes	
Toys in the Attic	Jiří Barta	Family film	75 minutes	
2010
Deadline	Filip Javora	Drama	1 Minute	
Dedicated to Darkness	Soňa Jelínková	Drama	7 Minutes	
Feeders	Pavel Soukup	Comedy	3 Minutes	
Kooky	Jan Svěrák	Action Family Film	96 Minutes	
Starless	Marek Berger	Science Fiction	4 Minutes	
Stěna vzpomínek	Verica Kordič	Drama	6 Minutes	
Surviving Life	Jan Švankmajer	Comedy, Drama	109 Minutes	
Swimming Pool	Alexandra Hetmerová	Drama	7 Minutes	
2011
Alois Nebel	Tomáš Luňák	Drama	84 Minutes	Won European Film Award for Best Animated Feature Film
The Great Sneezer	Noro Držiak	Action Comedy	11 Minutes	
A King Had a Horse	Aleš Pachner	Grotesque Horror	15 Minutes	
Není hra jako hra	Matěj Mráz	Family Film	7 Minutes	
Nezaměstnaný	Viktor Zwiener	Drama	15 Minutes	
Romeo a Julie	Hana Kotlářová	Romantic	7 Minutes	
Tomorrow Never Knows (short film)	Pavel Soukup	Drama	5 Minutes	
Úlovek	Marek Berger		3 Minutes	
Výhled	Milan Ondruch, Jaroslav Mrázek	Drama	8 Minutes	
2012
Another world	Matyáš Trnka	Drama	2 Minutes	
Brumlik a Animuk	Jan Bohuslav	Fairy Tale	10 Minutes	
Goat Story 2	Jan Tománek	Comedy	85 minutes	
In Wine There is the Truth	Aneta Kýrová Žabková	Comedy	10 Minutes	
Nekudrň	Veronika Jelínková		7 Minutes	
Sličná tvář	Soňa Jelínková	Drama	10 Minutes	
2013
An Alien	Martin Máj	Dark Comedy	7 Minutes	
Class of Death	Pavel Soukup	Horror, Thriller	7 Minutes	
Dinosaurs	Dao Thi Thuy Linh	Drama	5 Minutes	
Duchové lesa	Miroslav Bula	Horror	43 Minutes	
Kitchen Tales	Vojtěch Domlátil	Family Film	8 Minutes	
The Little Costeau	Jakub Kouřil	Adventure film	8 Minutes	Czech Lion for best Student Film
Lovebook	Hana Kotlářová	Romantic	9 Minutes	
Mythopolis	Alexandra Hetmerová	Fantasy	11 Minutes	Inspired by Ancient Greek Mythology
The New Species	Kateřina Karhánková	Family Film	7 Minutes	
You Are So Lucky!	Zuzana Brachaczková	Comedy	6 Minutes	
Yuki Onna – Snow woman	Jiří Barta	Fantasy	14 Minutes	
2014
Chrrrrrrrrrrrrr	Jaromír Plachý	Dark Comedy	4 Minutes	
Čertova díra	Miroslav Bula	Horror	21 minutes	
Entangled	Stanislav Sekela	Horror		
The Gingerbread Case	Pavel Jindra	Comedy	7 Minutes	Inspired by Hansel and Gretel
Gottland	Viera Čákanyová, Petr Hátle, Rozálie Kohoutová, Lukáš Kokeš, Klára Tasovská	Drama	105 minutes	
2015
Deep in Moss	Filip Pošivač, Barbora Valecká	Fantasy	26 minutes	
Little from the Fish Shop	Jan Balej	Romantic Drama	71 Minutes	Loosely based on Hans Christian Andersen's story "The Little Mermaid"
The Little Man	Radek Beran	Fairy Tale	83 Minutes	Based on a Book by Petra Uhlířová.
Metro	Michal Bahounek	Drama	2 Minutes	
Nezbeda	Daniela Hýbnerová		2 minutes.	
Wildlife Crossing!	Noro Držiak	Comedy	6 Minutes	
2016
Murderous Tales	Jan Bubeníček	Anthology	80 Minutes	
The Oddsockeaters	Galina Miklínová	Adventure	83 Minutes	Adaptation of a novel of the same name.
Pat and Mat in a Movie	Marek Beneš	Comedy	80 Minutes	
The Shadow over Prague	Marek Berger	Action	13 Minutes	Based on Superhero Pérák, the Spring Man of Prague
2017
Harvie and the Magic Museum	Martin Kotík, Inna Jevlannikova	Comedy	85 Minutes	
Lajka	Aurel Klimt	Science Fiction	85 Minutes	Inspired by Soviet space dog Laika.
2018
Pat and Mat in Action Again	Marek Beneš	Comedy	75 Minutes	
2019
Daughter	Daria Kashcheeva	Drama	15 Minutes	
Great Adventure of the Lucky Four	Michal Žabka	Comedy	72 Minutes	
The Kite	Martin Smatana		13 Minutes	Won Best animated film award at FamuFest.
2020
Carousel	Jasmine Elsen		10 Minutes	
Crumbs	Robert Hloz	Drama	12 Minutes	
Fur Coats	Lucie Vostárková		5 Minutes	
Hungry Bear Tales	Alexandra Májová, Kateřina Karhánková	Anthology	45 Minutes	
Leaf	Aliona Baranova		6 Minutes	
S P A C E S	Nora Štrbová	Documentary	8 Minutes	
2021
Even Mice Belong in Heaven	Jan Bubeníček, Denisa Grimmová	Adventure, Comedy	80 Minutes	
2022
Journey to Yourland	Peter Budinský	Adventure, Fantasy	86 minutes	
2023
Electra	Daria Kashcheeva		27 minutes	
2024
Big Man	Radek Beran	Comedy, Fantasy	72 minutes	
Living Large	Kristina Dufková	Comedy, Family	80 minutes	
The Proud Princess	Radek Beran	Family, Fantasy	84 minutes	
2025
Stone of Destiny	Julie Černá		11 minutes	
