= Czech animation =

Artistic tradition

Czech animation has been a tradition for over 100 years. Czech animators are considered pioneers in film animation. Czech animation dates back to the 1920s, and its "Golden Era" spans between the 1950s and the 1980s. Notable Czech animators include Jiří Trnka, Karel Zeman, Břetislav Pojar, Jan Švankmajer, Vera Neubauer, Hermína Týrlová, and Jiří Barta. Czech animators have employed cel animation, cutout animation, puppet animation, and clay animation. 3D animation is seldom used due to lack of finances and trained 3D animators. This led to a decline in the years following 1989.

Though the "Golden Era" has ended for Czech animation, a new generation of animators remain who sustain Czech animation traditions. Training in Czech animation is supported by some Czech universities, such as The Film and TV School of the Academy of Performing Arts in Prague, The Academy of Arts, Architecture and Design in Prague, and The University of West Bohemia.

== History ==
=== Early years (1920–1944) ===
The production of Czech animation began in the 1920s. Czech animated production from the 1920s to 1945 was created primarily as advertisements for products and as works for children, with the earliest Czech animation being Bohuslav Šula's unfinished 1920 film Broučci, an adaptation of the classic children's book of the same name by Jan Karafiát. Most of the films produced in this era were shorter than 10 minutes. In 1927, the animator Karel Dodal began creating a series of advertisements starring the popular character Felix the Cat. The advertisements were predominantly for savings banks.

By the 1930s, puppet animations were also in production. Spejblovo filmové opojení (1931), a thirty-two minute satirical work featuring Spejbl, was one of the first puppet animations released in Czech cinemas. The first experimental animated film was Karel Dodal's Myšlenka hledající světlo (1938). In 1937, Czech animation gained international attention when Dodal's work was shown at the 1937 Exhibition in Paris. In 1943, the first mixed live-action puppet animation production, Vánoční sen, directed by Hermína Týrlová, was released. The film was lost in a 1944 laboratory fire, and a recreation was subsequently produced by Karel Zeman in 1944.

Significant animators who began their careers during this period include Břetislav Pojar, Stanislav Látal, Jiří Trnka, Karel Zeman, and Hermína Týrlová, who previously worked as an assistant to Dodal.

=== Golden Age (1945–1989) ===
The roots of the Czech "Golden Age" of animation began in 1945 when puppet theater operators Eduard Hofman and Jiří Trnka founded the animation studio Bratři v triku. In 1945, the studio released its first production, Zasadil dědek řepu, directed by Trnka. The film was a ten minute long adaptation of a popular Czech folk tale. In the same year, Zeman's recreation of Vánoční sen was released. In 1946, Jiří Trnka directed Zvířátka a petrovští; both films brought critical acclaim to the Czech animation industry by winning short film awards at the 1st annual Cannes Film Festival. Czech animation also expanded following World War II due to the nationalization of Czechoslovak film industry, which allowed the development of feature-length films and more consistent studio output due to an increased amount of resources.

In the late 1940s, Jiří Trnka expanded from two-dimensional animation to puppet animation and created the first feature-length Czech puppet animation film, Špalíček. The film was also Trnka's first feature-length production. By the end of the 1950s, Trnka had made 6 full-length films and 12 short animated films, and was one of the most productive animators in the world. His films produced in the 1950s such as Prince Bayaya, Old Czech Legends and A Midsummer Night's Dream earned him worldwide acclaim and the nickname "the Walt Disney of Eastern Europe". His final film The Hand was declared the 5th best animated picture in history.

Other important figures in Bratři v triku include Zdeněk Miler, who created the popular cartoon character Mole, and Josef Kábrt, who worked on the film Fantastic Planet. The children's animated series Pohádky z mechu a kapradí was also developed by Bratři v triku. Another notable animator was Břetislav Pojar, who worked under Trnka, known for his animated series Pojďte pane, budeme si hrát.

The second most prominent Czech animation studio was based in Zlín, where Karel Zeman and Hermína Týrlová were considered the main figures. Týrlová earned fame for her children's films, with her most famous film being 1947's Vzpoura hraček. Zeman's films gained worldwide attention for its unique mixture of animation and live-action actors. His films drew inspiration from novels Jules Verne. His The Fabulous World of Jules Verne is considered the most successful Czech film ever made.

The second generation of animators includes Jan Švankmajer, who emerged in the mid-1960s, Jiří Barta, Vlasta Pospíšilová, experimental animator Vera Neubauer, and Lubomír Beneš, the creator of the series Pat & Mat. Significant films of 1980s include The King and the Goblin (1980) by Lubomír Beneš, The Pied Piper (1986) by Jiří Barta and Alice (1988) by Jan Švankmajer. Animated films were funded by the State during Communism but were censored and many projects couldn't be realized as a result.

=== Modern era (1990–present) ===
The Czech film industry was privatized after 1989, which resulted in lack of finances for animated films and more limitations on films produced by Czech animators. On the other hand, there are still films made. Jan Švankmajer produced films in the 1990s, such as Faust. Other notable animators in the modern era include Aurel Klimt, Pavel Koutský, Tomasz Bagiński, Jan Svěrák, and Michaela Pavlátová (the latter known for her Academy Award-nominated short Reci, Reci, Reci (1991) and Golden Globe-nominated feature My Sunny Maad (2021).

In 2008, the first Czech feature-length computer-animated film, Goat Story directed by Jan Tománek, was released.

In 2020, the film Daughter (2019) directed by Daria Kashcheeva was nominated for Best Animated Short Film at the 92nd Academy Awards.

== Festivals of animated films ==
=== Anifest ===
Anifest was an international festival of animated films held annually in the Czech Republic. It was established in 2002 and has attracted more than twenty-thousand guests per year. It is a specialized competition festival of animated production for film professionals, artists and animation lovers that builds on the famous tradition of Czech animated film and offers a unique opportunity to become familiar with the best of contemporary world and Czech animation work. In addition to the competitive and non-competitive film events, the festival includes various theatre performances, exhibitions, concerts and discussions, parties and other cultural and social events.

=== Anifilm ===
Anifilm is an International Festival of Animated Films held in Liberec, Czech Republic (until 2019 in Třeboň). It was founded in 2010. Festival features the most interesting films from the entire spectrum of animation, with awards in the categories of student work, design for television and made to order, and Best Film.

== Significant works ==
=== Significant films ===
- Vánoční sen (A Christmas Dream) (1945)
- Zasadil dědek řepu (My grandfather planted a beet) (1945)
- Vzpoura hraček (Revolt of the Toys) (1946)
- Špalíček (The Czech Year) (1947)
- Dárek (The Gift) (1947)
- Vynález zkázy (Invention for Destruction/The Fabulous World of Jules Verne) (1958)
- Baron Prášil (The Fabulous Baron Munchausen) (1962)
- Ruka (The Hand) (1965)
- Divoká planeta (Fantastic Planet) (1973)
- Možnosti dialogu (Dimensions of Dialogue) (1983)
- Krysař (The Pied Piper) (1986)
- Něco z Alenky (Alice) (1988)
- Na půdě aneb Kdo má dneska narozeniny? (Toys in the Attic) (2009)
- Alois Nebel (2011)
- Even Mice Belong in Heaven (2021)

=== Significant television series ===
- Krtkova dobrodružství (1963)
- Pojďte pane, budeme si hrát (1965)
- Broučci (1966)
- Maxipes Fik (1976)
- Pat a Mat (1976)
- Bob a Bobek – králíci z klobouku (1979)

== See also ==
- Cinema of the Czech Republic
- Independent animation
- Arthouse animation
