= Magnesie Award for Best Student Film =

Czech film award

- Country: Czech Republic
- First award: 2010
- Currently held by: Dog and Wolf
- Website: https://www.filmovaakademie.cz

Magnesie Award for Best Student Film is one award given to the best Czech student film.

== Winners ==
Year	English Name	Original Name	Director
2010	Graffitiger	Graffitiger	Libor Pixa
2011	Non-swimmers	Neplavci	Jakub Šmíd
2012	M.O.	M.O.	Jakub Kouřil
2013	The Little Cousteau	Malý Cousteau	Jakub Kouřil
2014	A Righteous Choice	Pravomil	Pavel Nosek
2015	Peacock	Furiant	Ondřej Hudeček
2016	Kyjev Moskva	Kyjev Moskva	Anna Lyubynetska
2017	Atlantida, 2003	Atlantida, 2003	Michal Blaško
2018	One Hundred and Twenty-Eight Thousand	Sto dvacet osm tisíc	Ondřej Erban
2019	Daughter	Dcera	Daria Kashcheeva
2020	Anatomy of a Czech Afternoon	Anatomie českého odpoledne	Adam Martinec
2021	Love, Dad	Milý tati	Diana Cam Van Nguyen
2022	Vinland	Vinland	Martin Kuba
2023	Electra	Electra	Daria Kashcheeva
2024	Weeds	Plevel	Pola Kazak
2025	Dog and Wolf	Pes a vlk	Terézia Halamová
