= Punch and Judy (disambiguation) =

Punch and Judy is a traditional puppet show featuring Mr. Punch and his wife Judy.

Punch and Judy may refer to:

- Punch and Judy (film), a 1906 French silent comedy
- Punch and Judy (opera), a chamber opera by Harrison Birtwistle
- "Punch and Judy", a song by The Cascades from the 1963 album Rhythm of the Rain
- "Punch and Judy" (song), by Marillion, 1984
- "Punch and Judy", a song by The Stranglers from the 1984 album Aural Sculpture
- "Punch and Judy", a song by Elliott Smith from the 1997 album Either/Or
- Punch and Judy, Cowboy Bebop characters
- Punch and Judy, The Batman characters
- Punch and Judy Comics, a golden age comic book series
- Punch and Judy (dogs), dogs awarded the Dickin Medal in 1946

== See also ==
- Punch or May Day, an 1829 painting by Benjamin Robert Haydon
- The Punch and Judy Man, a 1963 British comedy film
- The Punch and Judy Murders, a 1936 novel by John Dickson Carr
- Judy and Punch, a 2019 Australian black comedy film
- Punch and Jewelee, fictional characters from DC Comics
- The Tragical Comedy or Comical Tragedy of Mr. Punch, a 1994 graphic novel by Neil Gaiman and Dave McKean
