= List of films about the Czech resistance to Nazi occupation =

This is a list of films about the Czech resistance to Nazi occupation.

Year	Country	Title	Director	Notes
1943	United States	Hangmen Also Die!	Fritz Lang	Noir film inspired by Operation Anthropoid
1943	United States	Hitler's Madman	Douglas Sirk	Film about the assassination of Reinhard Heydrich and the Lidice massacre
1943	United States	Hostages	Frank Tuttle	
1946	Czechoslovakia	A Big Case	Václav Kubásek, Josef Mach	
1946	Czechoslovakia	Hrdinové mlčí	Miroslav Cikán	
1946	Czechoslovakia	Men Without Wings	František Čáp	
1946	Czechoslovakia	Springman and the SS	Jiří Trnka	Inspired by Pérák, the Spring Man of Prague
1947	Czechoslovakia	Nikdo nic neví	Josef Mach	
1949	Czechoslovakia	Silent Barricade	Otakar Vávra	Set during Prague uprising
1950	Czechoslovakia	The Last Shot	Jiří Weiss	
1950	Czechoslovakia	The Trap	Martin Frič	
1955	Czechoslovakia	The Tank Brigade	Ivo Toman	About 1st Czechoslovak Armoured Brigade
1956	Czechoslovakia	The Unconquered	Jiří Sequens	Inspired by Battle of Czajánek's barracks
1957	Czechoslovakia	Jurášek	Miroslav Cikán	
1960	Czechoslovakia	Práče	Karel Kachyňa	
1963	Czechoslovakia	Death Is Called Engelchen	Ján Kadár and Elmar Klos	
1964	Czechoslovakia	Atentát	Jiří Sequens	Film about Operation Anthropoid
1964	Czechoslovakia	The Fifth Horseman Is Fear	Zbyněk Brynych	
1966	Czechoslovakia	Closely Watched Trains	Jiří Menzel	Academy Awards winner
1967	Czechoslovakia	The Seven Ravens	Vladimír Čech	
1968	Czechoslovakia	Maratón	Ivo Novák	
1968	Czechoslovakia	Nebeští jezdci	Jindřich Polák	It tells the story of the crews of the RAF's No. 311 Squadron.
1968	Czechoslovakia; United States; Yugoslavia	Operation Daybreak	Lewis Gilbert	Based on Operation Anthropoid
1971	Czechoslovakia	The Key	Vladimír Čech	
1972	Czechoslovakia	The Hangman Can't Wait	František Filip	
1974	Czechoslovakia	Sokolovo	Otakar Vávra	About Battle of Sokolovo
1975	Czechoslovakia; East Germany	The Liberation of Prague	Otakar Vávra	About Prague uprising.
1975	Czechoslovakia	Weapons for Prague	Ivo Toman	
1976	Czechoslovakia	The Cape of Good Hope	Otakar Fuka	
1977	Soviet Union	Soldiers of Freedom	Yuri Ozerov	
1981	Czechoslovakia	Ta chvíle, ten okamžik	Jiří Sequens	
1989	Czechoslovakia; Soviet Union	Pilots	Otakar Fuka	About Czechoslovak pilots on Eastern Front.
1998	Czech Republic	Sekal Has to Die	Vladimír Michálek	
2000	Czech Republic	Divided We Fall	Jan Hřebejk	
2001	Czech Republic	Dark Blue World	Jan Svěrák	
2003	Czech Republic; Slovakia	Želary	Ondřej Trojan	
2007	Czech Republic	Operace Silver A	Jiří Strach	About operation of the same name.
2008	Czech Republic	Tobruk	Václav Marhoul	Set during Siege of Tobruk.
2010	Czech Republic; Germany	Habermann	Juraj Herz	
2016	Czech Republic; United Kingdom; France	Anthropoid	Sean Ellis	Film about Operation Anthropoid
2016	Czech Republic	The Shadow over Prague	Marek Berger	Inspired by Pérák, the Spring Man of Prague
2017	Czech Republic; Slovakia; Denmark	Barefoot	Jan Svěrák	
2017	France; Belgium	The Man with the Iron Heart	Cédric Jimenez	Based on novel HHhH.
2020	Czech Republic	Shadow Country	Bohdan Sláma	Based on a true story.
2025	Czech Republic; Slovakia; Serbia	Secret Delivery	Ján Sebechlebský	
2026	Czech Republic	Lone Wolf	Ondřej Veverka	About Josef František.
2027	Czech Republic	Ležáky	Miloš Pilař	Film about Ležáky massacre. The film also shows Assassination of Reinhard Heydrich.
