= Andrew J. Feustel =

American-Canadian NASA astronaut and geophysicist (born 1965)

Drew Feustel
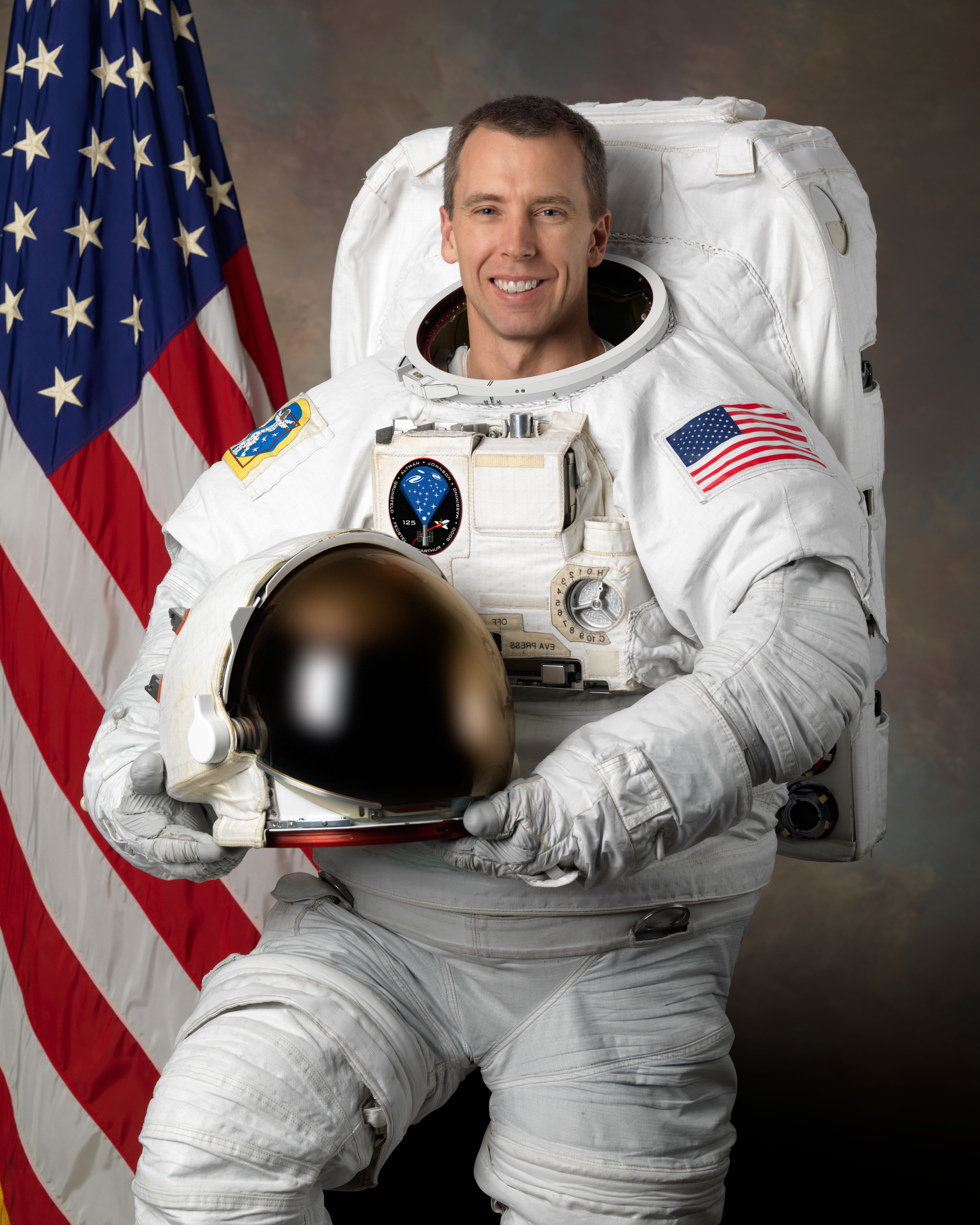
- Feustel in 2007
- Born: Andrew Jay Feustel; August 25, 1965 (age 61); Lancaster, Pennsylvania, U.S.
- Education: Oakland Community College (AS); Purdue University (BS, MS); Queen's University (PhD)
- Space career

NASA astronaut
- Time in space: 225 days, 9 hours, 16 minutes
- Selection: NASA Group 18 (2000)
- Total EVAs: 9
- Total EVA time: 61 hours, 48 minutes
- Missions: STS-125; STS-134; Soyuz MS-08 (Expedition 55/56)
- Mission insignia
- Retired: July 31, 2023

Andrew Jay Feustel (/ˈfɔɪstəl/; born August 25, 1965) is an American/Canadian former NASA astronaut and geophysicist. Following several years working as a geophysicist, Feustel was selected as an astronaut candidate by NASA in July 2000. He is the veteran of 3 space flights with NASA. His first spaceflight in May 2009, STS-125, lasted just under 13 days. This mission was the fifth and final mission to service the Hubble Space Telescope, aboard Space Shuttle Atlantis. Feustel performed three spacewalks during the mission. His second spaceflight was STS-134, which launched on May 16, 2011, to deliver the Alpha Magnetic Spectrometer to the International Space Station (ISS) and was the final flight of Space Shuttle Endeavour and was the penultimate flight of the Space Shuttle program. Feustel returned to the ISS on March 21, 2018, aboard Soyuz MS-08, to serve as a member of Expedition 55 and was the ISS Commander during Expedition 56. After returning to Earth, he became the Deputy Chief of the NASA Astronaut Office in 2020, and served as acting Chief Astronaut starting in November 2022. Feustel retired from NASA in July 2023.

== Education and early career ==
Feustel was born in Lancaster, Pennsylvania. He grew up in Lake Orion, Michigan, where he graduated from Lake Orion High School in 1983, and received an Associate of Science degree from Oakland Community College in 1985. He then attended Purdue University, where he was a member of Sigma Phi Epsilon fraternity and received both a Bachelor of Science degree in solid earth sciences in 1989 and a Master of Science degree in geophysics in 1991. He then moved to Ontario, Canada to attend Queen's University, where he received his PhD in geological sciences in 1995.

While attending community college, Feustel worked as an auto mechanic at International Autoworks, Ltd., Farmington Hills, Michigan, restoring 1950s Jaguars. At Purdue University, Feustel served as a Residence Hall Counselor for two years at Cary Quadrangle for the Purdue University Student Housing organization. His summers were spent working as a commercial and industrial glazier near his home in Michigan. During his master's degree studies Feustel worked as a Research Assistant and Teaching Assistant in the Earth and Atmospheric Sciences Department of Purdue University. His M.S. thesis investigated physical property measurements of rock specimens under elevated hydrostatic pressures simulating Earth's deep crustal environments. While at Purdue, Feustel served for three years as Grand Prix Chairman and team Kart driver for Sigma Phi Epsilon Fraternity. In 1991, Feustel moved to Kingston, Ontario, Canada to attend Queen's University where he worked as a Graduate Research Assistant and Graduate Teaching Assistant. Feustel's Ph.D. thesis investigated seismic wave attenuation in underground mines and measurement techniques and applications to site characterization.

For three years, Feustel worked as a geophysicist for the Engineering Seismology Group, Kingston, Ontario, Canada, installing and operating microseismic monitoring equipment in underground mines throughout Eastern Canada and the United States. In 1997, he began working for the Exxon Exploration Company (now ExxonMobil Exploration Company), Houston, Texas, as an exploration geophysicist designing and providing operational oversight of land, marine, and borehole seismic programs worldwide. He worked in industry for five years before joining NASA.

== NASA career ==
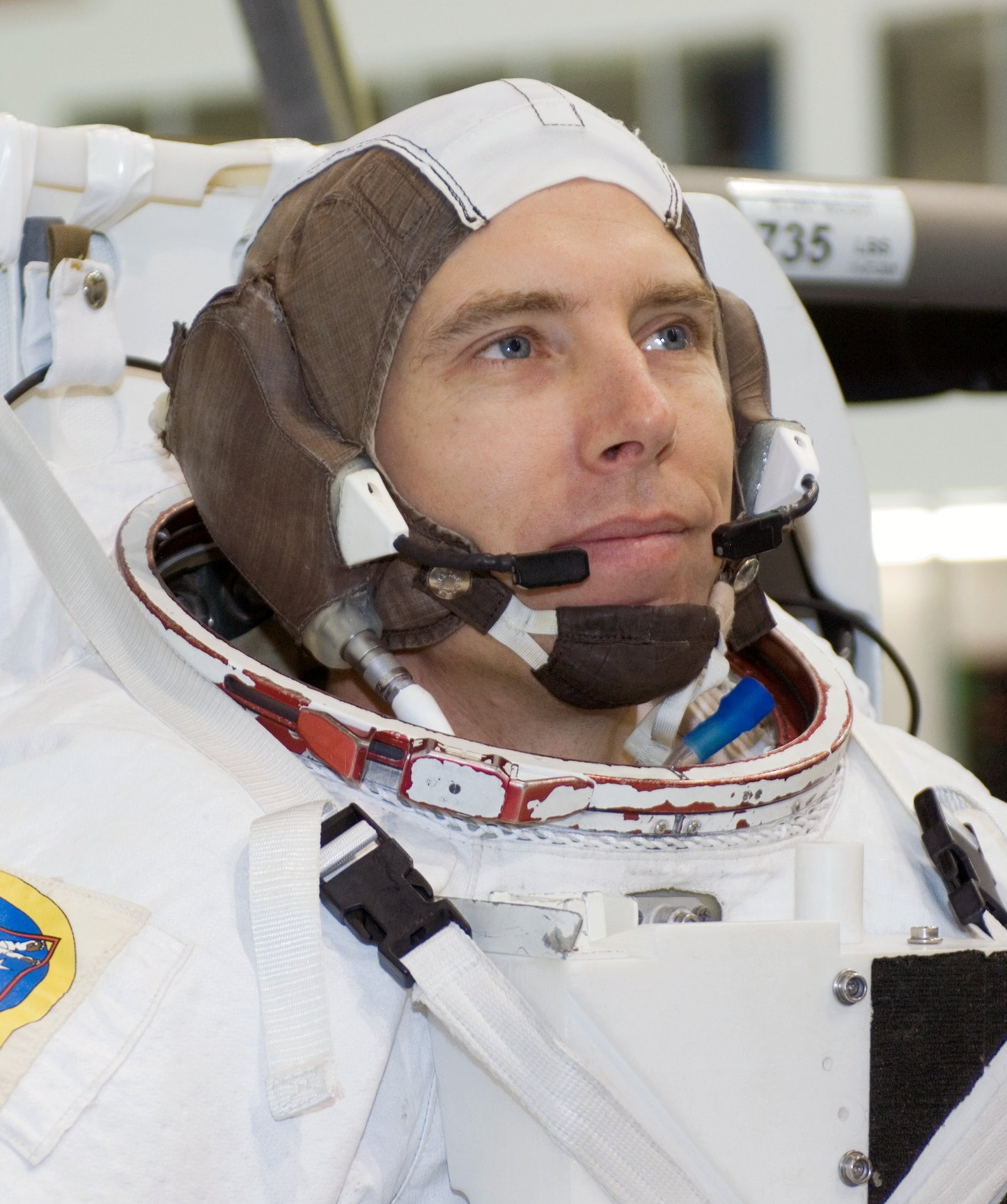
Feustel before training at the Neutral Buoyancy Laboratory in 2007

In July 2000, Feustel was selected as an astronaut candidate by NASA. He reported to the Johnson Space Center in August 2000, where he began NASA's two-year training program, training as a mission specialist. After his initial training, he worked in technical roles the Astronaut Office Space Shuttle and Space Station Branches.

Feustel's subsequent NASA Astronaut training includes: Field Medical Training, Field Maintenance Training, NASA Extreme Environment Mission Operation (NEEMO) X in the Aquarius Habitat in Key Largo, Florida; CAVES in Sardinia, Italy; National Outdoor Leadership School training in Alaska and Mexico; Winter Survival Training with the Canadian Armed Forces; Desert RATS in Arizona; Geotechnical Studies in Antarctica; and DeepWorker Submersible Pilot Training. He is qualified as a Space Shuttle and Space Station Robotic Arm Operator, Capsule Communicator (CAPCOM), and Instructor Astronaut for Extravehicular activity (EVA) training at the Neutral Buoyancy Laboratory.

In July 2006, Feustel served as an aquanaut during the NEEMO 10 mission aboard the Aquarius underwater laboratory, living and working underwater for seven days. In October 2006, Feustel was announced as a crew member for STS-125, the final Hubble servicing mission by the Space Shuttle. STS-125 launched on May 11, 2009.

In 2013, Feustel served as cavenaut into the ESA CAVES training in Sardinia, alongside Soichi Noguchi, Andreas Mogensen, Nikolai Tikhonov, David Saint-Jacques and Michael Fincke.

=== STS-125 ===
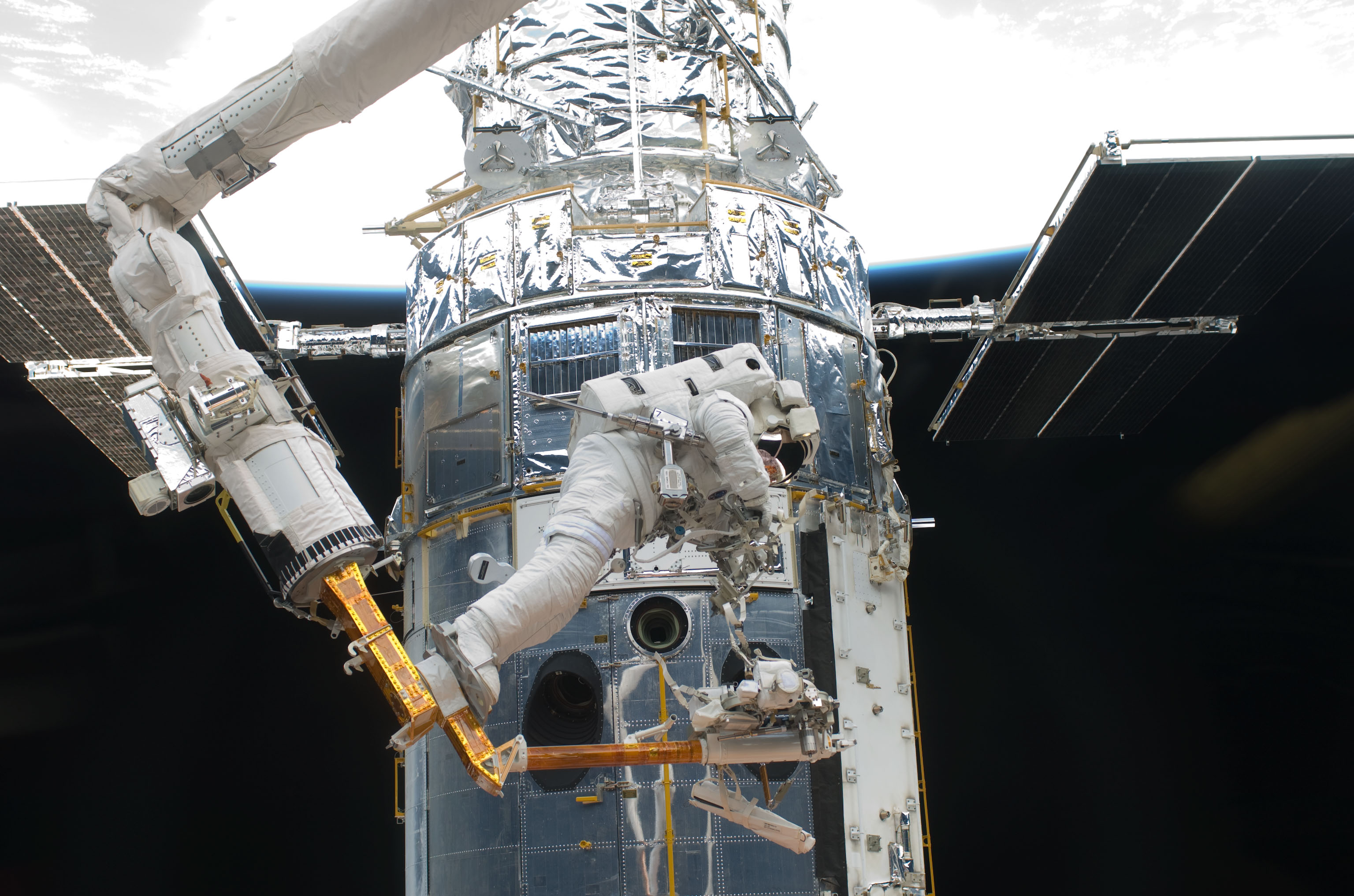
Feustel in front of the Hubble Space Telescope during STS-125

Feustel's first mission was STS-125, which was successfully launched to repair the Hubble Space Telescope on May 11, 2009. On this mission, Feustel was a mission specialist, and performed three spacewalks to help repair the telescope itself. During the mission, Feustel accumulated a total EVA time of twenty hours and thirty eight minutes. He took with him a copy of "Cosmic Songs" (1878) by the Czech poet Jan Neruda and Emm Gryner's album Asianblue.

=== STS-134 ===
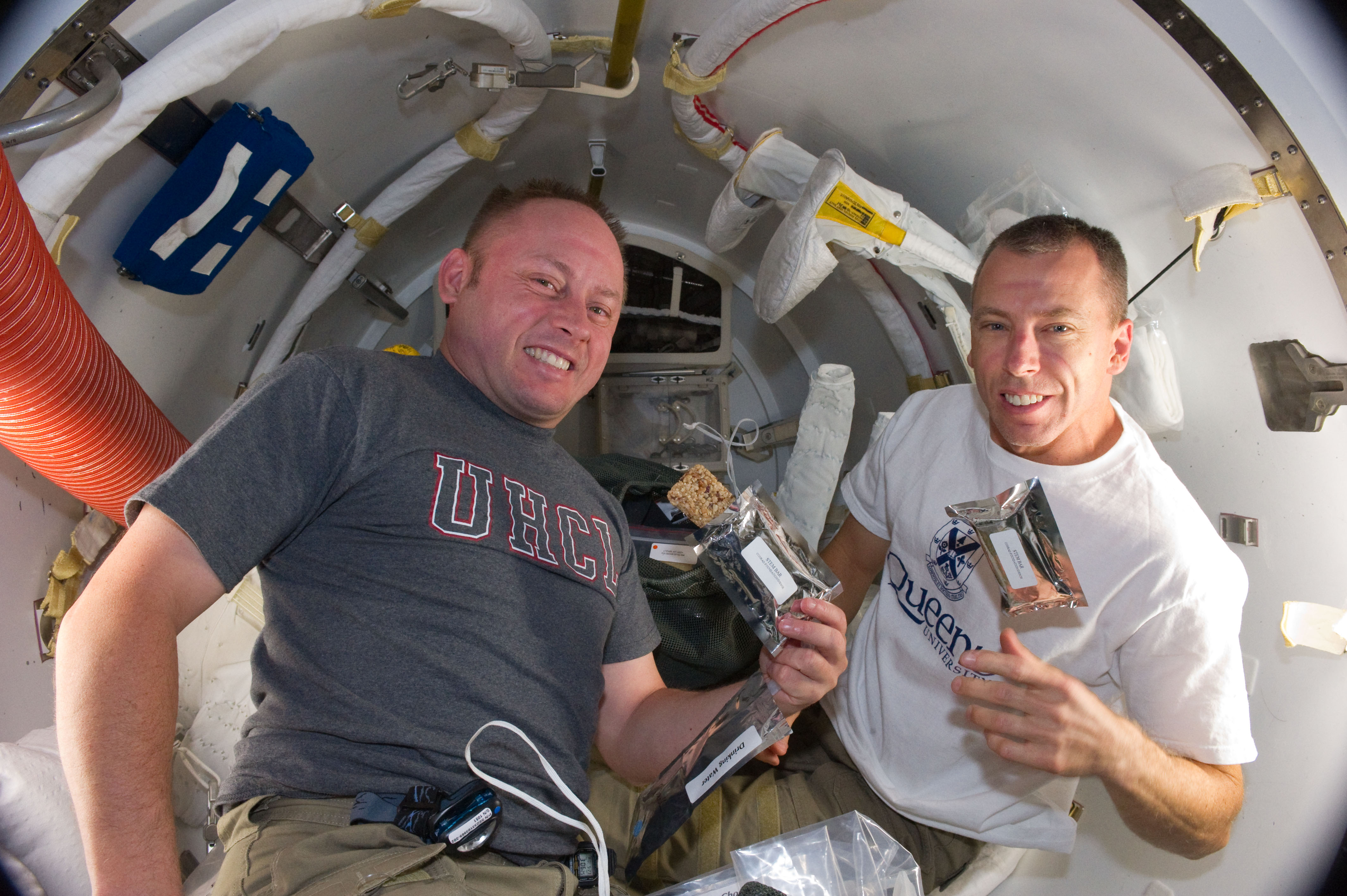
Feustel (right) pictured with fellow astronaut Mike Fincke prior to an EVA during STS-134

Feustel was a mission specialist on the STS-134 mission, during which he performed three more spacewalks. During this mission Feustel took a soft toy of the cartoon character Mole to space. In July 2011 Feustel and his family flew to Czech Republic to give that Mole to his creator the Czech animator and illustrator Zdeněk Miler. He was very happy and thanked Feustel with an artwork of him. Just four months later Miler died at the age of 90 years.

=== Expedition 55/56 ===
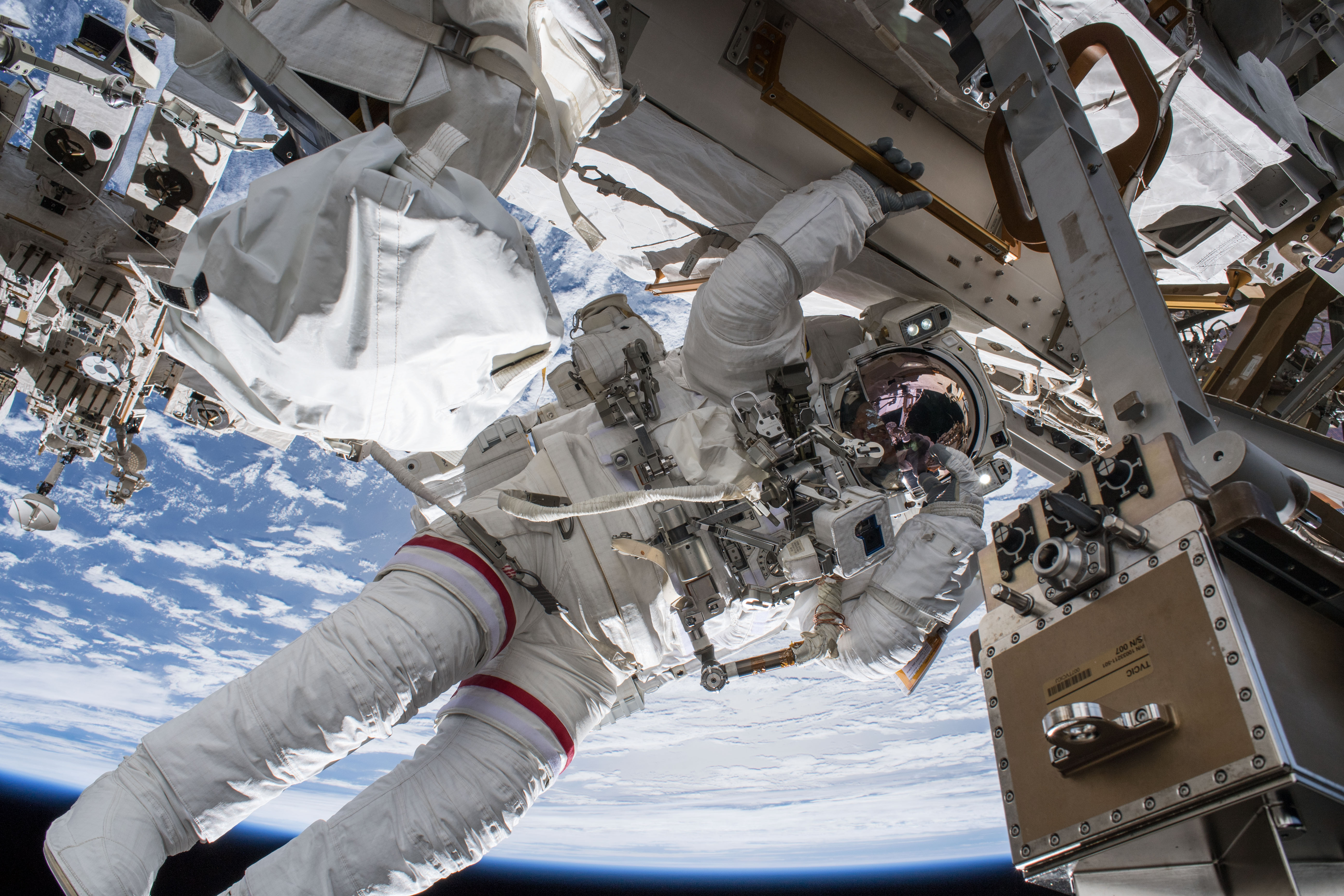
Feustel pictured during an EVA in 2018

Feustel returned to space on launching on March 21, 2018 for a six month stay during Expedition 55/56. He served as a flight engineer on Expedition 55, and then became the International Space Station (ISS) commander of Expedition 56. He returned to Earth on October 4, 2018.

On March 29, 2018, Feustel performed the first EVA of his mission with crewmate Ricky Arnold. They installed wireless communications equipment on the station's Tranquility module to enhance payload data processing for the ECOSTRESS experiment (Ecosystem Spaceborne Thermal Radiometer Experiment on Space Station). They also swapped out high-definition video cameras on the port truss of the station's backbone and removed aging hoses from a cooling component on the station's truss. The duration of the spacewalk was 6 hours and 10 minutes.

=== Deputy Chief of the NASA Astronaut Office ===
Feustel became the Deputy Chief of the NASA Astronaut Office in 2020, and served as acting Chief Astronaut starting in November 2022 after Reid Wiseman stepped down to return as an active duty astronaut. In February 2023 Joseph Acaba was appointed Chief, with Feustel remaining on as his deputy.

== Post-NASA career ==
After working for NASA for 23 years, Drew Feustel announced his retirement from the agency in July 2023. In December of that year, Vast, a space station manufacturer, announced that Feustel would join their team as an advisor.

== Personal life ==
Feustel is married to Indira Devi Feustel (née Bhatnagar). Andrew and Indira met as undergraduates at the beginning of Indira's master's degree at Purdue University in West Lafayette, Indiana; they have two sons. He enjoys automobile restoration, skiing and guitar, and is a member of the astronaut band Max Q.

| Preceded by Anton Shkaplerov | ISS Commander (Expedition 56); June 1 to October 3, 2018 | Succeeded by Alexander Gerst |
