= Swifty =

Swifty may refer to:

- Swifty Lazar (1907–1993), American talent agent and deal-maker
- Swifty McVay (born 1974), American rapper and member of D12
- Swifty, one of the two protagonists of the 2013 film The Selfish Giant
- Swifty The Space Bird, a main character in the anime The Adventures of the Little Prince
- Swifty Chase, the protagonist of the short-lived comic My Date Comics (1947-1948)
- Swiftie(s), the fandom of singer-songwriter Taylor Swift
- Swifty (film), a 1935 Western film directed by Alan James

== See also ==
- Tom Swifty, a type of pun
