= Hillman Periodicals =

American publishing company

- Founded: 1938
- Founder: Alex L. Hillman
- Defunct: 1953 (comics), 1961 (magazines and paperbacks)
- Country of origin: United States
- Headquarters location: 535 Fifth Avenue, New York City
- Publication types: Comic books, magazines, paperback books
- Fiction genres: Superhero, crime, Western

Hillman Periodicals, Inc. was an American magazine and comic book publishing company founded in 1938 by Alex L. Hillman, a former New York City book publisher. It is best known for its true confession and true crime magazines; for the long-running general-interest magazine Pageant; and for comic books including Air Fighters Comics and its successor Airboy Comics, which launched the popular characters Airboy and The Heap.

== Company history ==
=== Founding ===
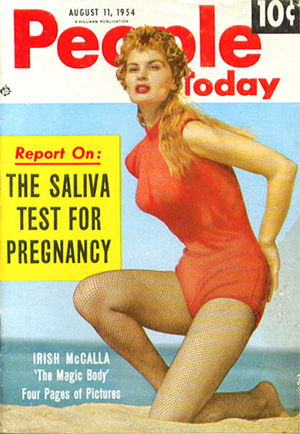
Hillman Periodicals' People Today (Aug. 11, 1954)

In the late 1930s and early 1940s, Hillman competed with Bernarr Macfadden and Fawcett Publications by publishing comics, true confessions magazines (Real Story, Real Confessions, Real Romances) and crime magazines (Crime Detective, Real Detective, Crime Confessions).

In 1948 Hillman began publishing paperback books. There were several series of abridged mystery and western novels published in the larger 'digest' size. The long-running Hillman paperbacks first appeared in 1948 and lasted until 1961.

=== Pageant and Airboy ===
In 1944, Hillman launched a digest-sized, general-interest, "slick" (glossy paper) magazine, Pageant, with an initial print run of 500,000 copies. To obtain the paper during World War II wartime rationing, Hillman ended his detective magazines and comics, which together brought in a $250,000 annual profit. He returned to comics in 1946, resuming some titles from the earlier series.

Like most comic book publishers during the period fans and historians called the Golden Age of comic books, Hillman's titles included costumed superheroes. As trends in the comic book market changed, the focus shifted more to crime fiction/detective stories, making Hillman one of the earliest crime comics publishers (Crime Detective Comics, Real Clue Crime Stories), and Westerns (Dead-Eye Western Comics and Western Fighters). During this time, Hillman often utilized the talents of Captain America creators Joe Simon and Jack Kirby. Hillman's most notable character, however, continuing in new stories by another publisher, Eclipse Comics, in the 1980s, was the Charles Biro, Dick Wood and Al Camy-created aviator-adventurer Airboy in Air Fighters Comics and its successor, Airboy Comics.

=== Later years ===
Hillman ceased publishing comic books in 1953, while continuing to launch such new magazines as Homeland, and People Today, while also distributing The Freeman, a journal of libertarian opinion. Amid a 1953 battle for control of directors and editors, publisher Hillman announced his resignation as the Freeman treasurer because "it has been almost impossible for the past six months to run the magazine". The following year, Hillman said he was thinking about launching a "conservative Republican" morning newspaper in Washington, D.C., but nothing came of it.

Hillman periodicals also had a publication named Flight, edited by Norton Wood. (Wood had previously served as managing editor of a highly classified monthly report on air weapons prepared by McGraw-Hill under contract with the U.S. Air Force. Wood had been a member of the editorial staff of This Week Magazine and of the U.S. Camera Publishing Co.) Flight contained stories of the tremendous revolution going on in the skies - the transition within a decade from air travel as men had understood it for two generations to an entire new era of flight at supersonic speeds and fantastic altitudes, of strange new shapes in aircraft design, of combat planes without pilots, and rocket voyages into outer space. Flight chronicled the revolution in the skies with lines of defense of the "H-Bomb" with futuristic drawings by Matt Greene artistically depicting a U.S. coastal city under coordinated attack by Russian bombers and submarines, and giant "inner tube" satellite space stations with depictions proposed by Wernher von Braun orbits in space flight.

Hillman sold Pageant to Macfadden Communications Group in April 1961, and the magazine continued until 1977.

== Alex L. Hillman ==
Publisher Alex L. Hillman was a noted art collector who initially developed an interest in the field when he was a book publisher, commissioning artists to illustrate new editions of classic literature. He was married to Rita Hillman. He began his collection with such American painters as Raphael Soyer and Preston Dickinson, and expanded it to include impressionist and other painters. He eventually established the Alex Hillman Family Foundation, a private foundation in Manhattan, to oversee the collection.

== Comic book titles published ==
- Air Fighters Comics (1941 series)
- Airboy Comics (1945 series continues from Air Fighters)
- All Sports Comics (1948 series continues from Real Sports)
- All-Time Sports Comics (1949 series continues from All Sports)
- Clue Comics (1943 series)
- Crime Detective Comics (1948 series)
- Crime Must Stop (1952 series)
- Dead-Eye Western Comics (1948 series)
- Frogman Comics (1952 series)
- Hot Rod and Speedway Comics (1952 series)
- Joe College Comics (1949 series)
- Miracle Comics (1940 series)
- Monster Crime Comics (1952 series)
- Mr. Anthony's Love Clinic (1949 series)
- My Date Comics (1947 series)
- Pirates Comics (1950 series)
- Punch and Judy Comics (1944 series)
- Real Clue Crime Stories (1947 series continues from Clue Comics)
- Real Sports Comics (1948 series)
- Rocket Comics (1940 series)
- Romantic Confessions (1949 series)
- Top Secret (1952 series)
- Victory Comics (1941 series)
- Western Fighters (1948 series)
