= The Little Mole =

Animated character by Zdeněk Miler

- The Little Mole
- First appearance: 1957
- Created by: Zdeněk Miler
- Voiced by: Zdeněk Miler's daughters
- Species: Mole
- Gender: Male

The Little Mole (Czech: Krtek, Krteček) is a series of cartoons as well as the name of their title character, an anthropomorphic mole, created by Czech animator Zdeněk Miler between 1957 and 2002. The first short film premiered at the 1957 Venice Film Festival, where it won the award for the best directing achievement.

== History ==
Little Mole was first seen in 1956 in Prague, when Miler wanted to create a children's cartoon about how flax is processed. He wanted a strong Disney influence to the cartoon by choosing an animal for the leading role, and decided to pick a mole after stumbling over a molehill during a walk. The first film, called Jak krtek ke kalhotkám přišel, had its premiere at the Venice Film Festival in 1957, where it was awarded two Golden Lions. Production of further episodes started in 1963 and since then, around fifty episodes have been created.

The first episode of the cartoon was narrated, but Miler wanted the cartoon to be understood in every country of the world, so he decided to use his daughters as voice actors, reducing the speech to short non-figurative exclamations in order to express the mole's feelings and world perception. Miler's daughters also became the bottleneck of the creation process as they were the ones who got to see the whole film first, thus Miler was able to decide whether the message of the movie was able to get to children or not.

The only episode where the mole talks is the first one. In the United Kingdom, the cartoons were transmitted by BBC with English narration by Colin Jeavons. Book adaptations were also published in English.

== Developments ==
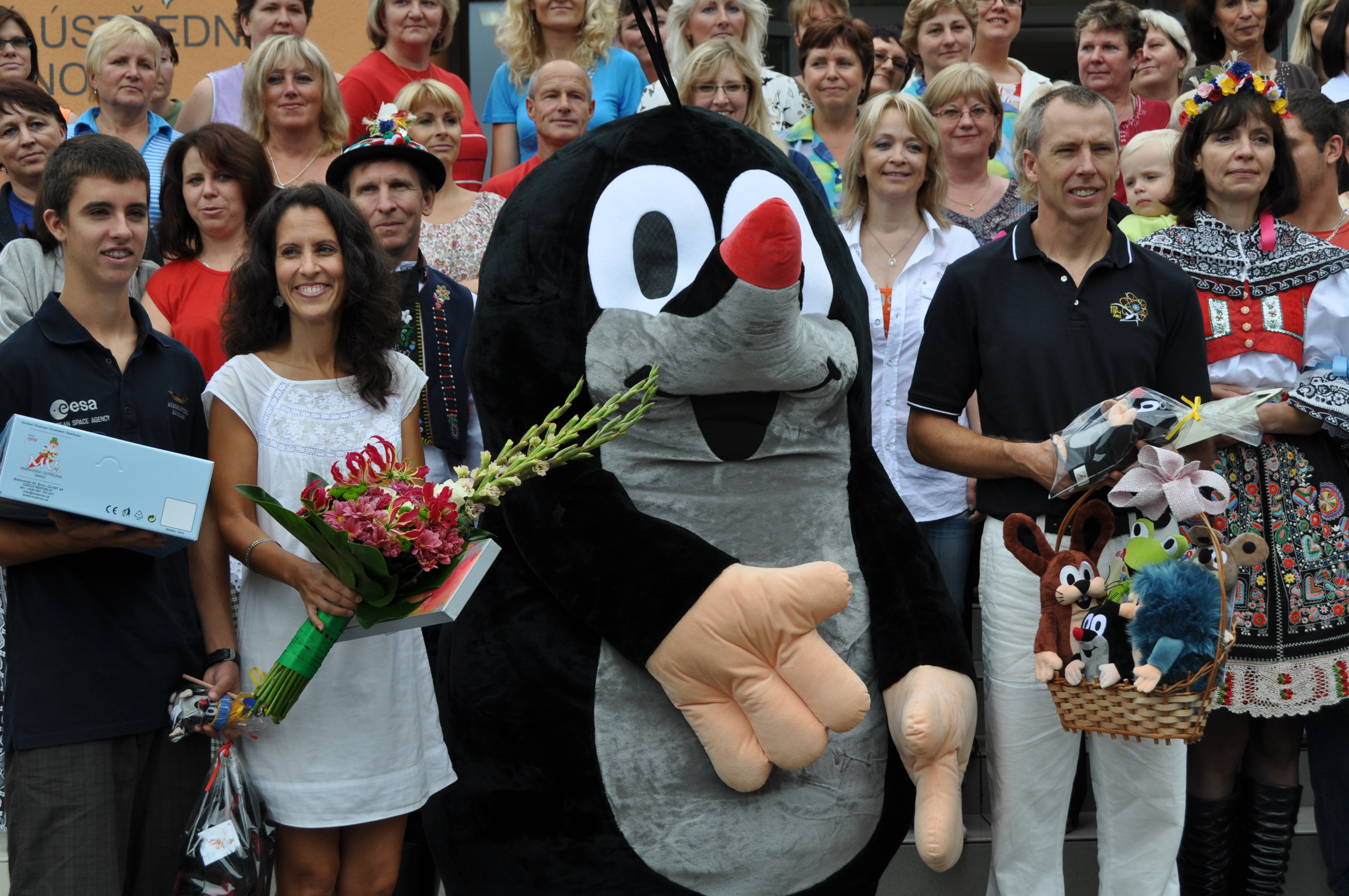
Andrew J. Feustel and Little Mole at a promotional event

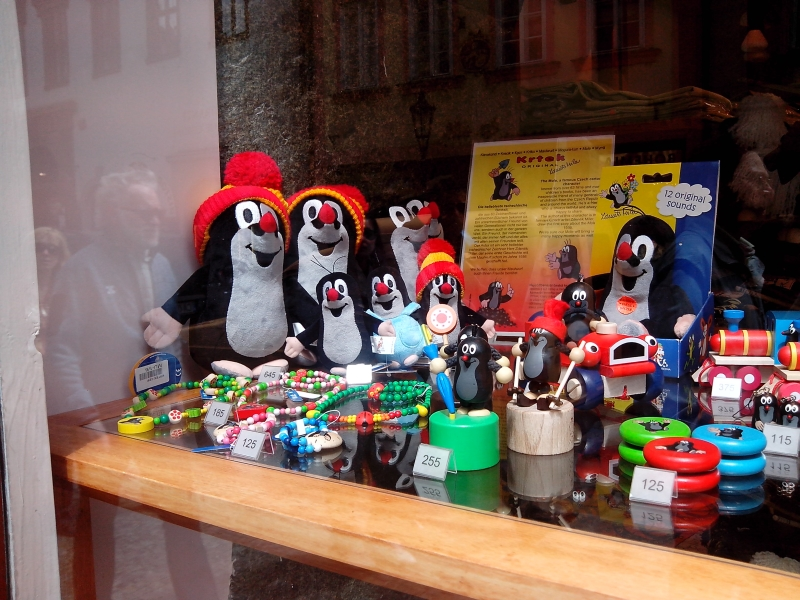
Little Mole in a Prague shop

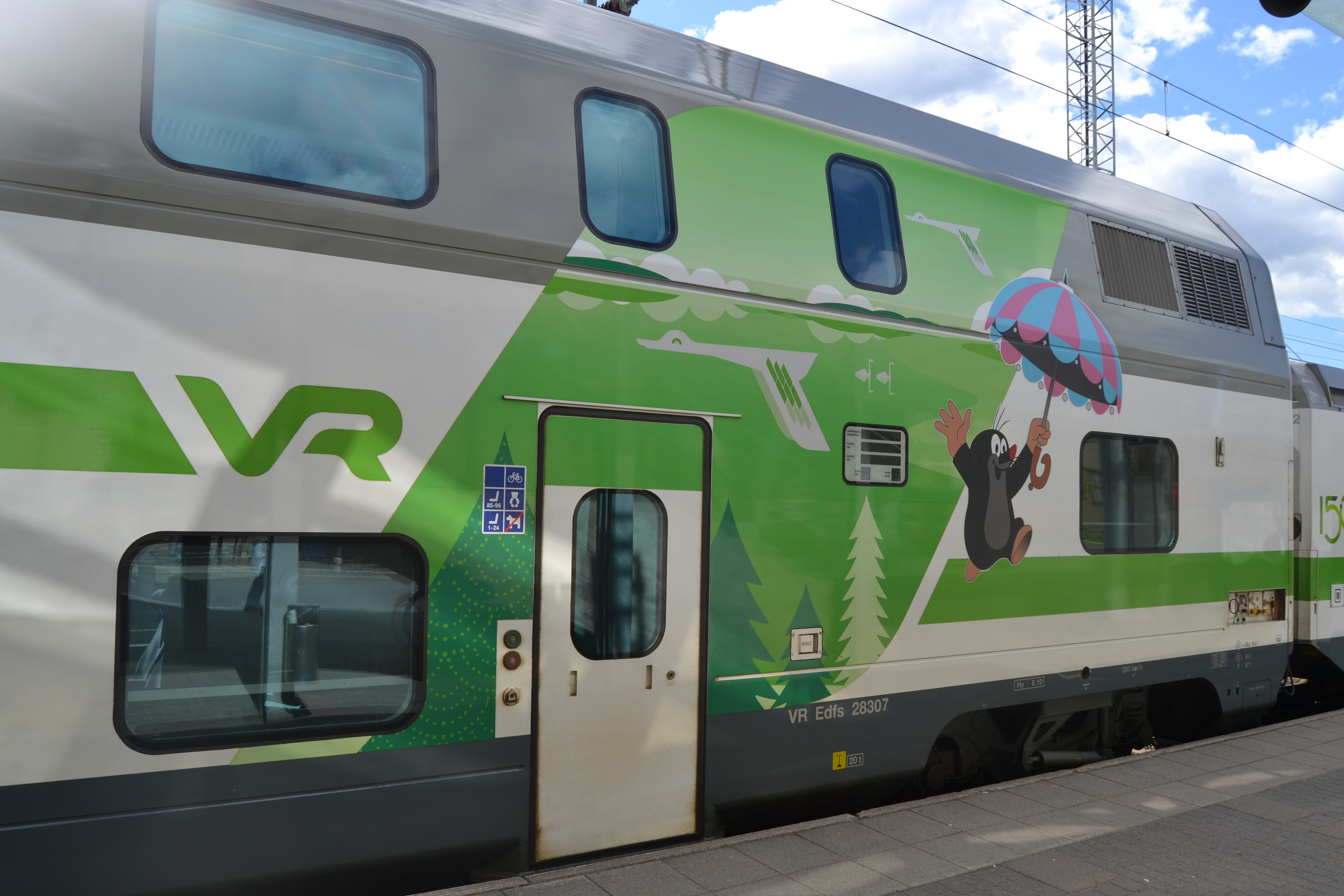
Little Mole on a Finnish VR commuter train

=== Space travels ===
On 16 May 2011, a plush toy of Little Mole was present on board the Space Shuttle Endeavour, where it accompanied the U.S. astronaut Andrew J. Feustel, whose wife is of Czech ancestry, on the STS-134 mission. It is the first animated character sent into space.

Several years later, Little Mole flew into space with the Russian Soyuz spacecraft.

=== US toy market plans ===
In May 2012, Bloomberg announced that Apple Inc. planned to help Little Mole enter the $21 billion U.S. toy market for the first time.

=== Mascot ===
Mole was the mascot for the 2015 European Athletics Indoor Championships in Prague, and was subsequently used to promote the Federation's Athletics for Children programme.

=== 3D adaptation ===
In 2016, China Central Television Animation and Little Mole a.s. (founded by Zdeněk Miler's granddaughter, Karolína Milerová) created a remake version called The Little Mole and the Panda. Two series were filmed in 2016–2017; the project was cancelled in 2019.

=== Alfa Romeo Racing partnership ===
On 23 May 2019, Alfa Romeo Racing, a Formula One team, announced Little Mole as the new team partner. Frédéric Vasseur, principal of the team, said that the goal of the partnership is to capture the imagination of hundreds of thousands of children and get them closer to the sport using Little Mole's big follower base all over the world. Mole's iconic figure is appearing on the sidepods of the cars for the rest of the 2019 season.

== Filmography ==
- In 2000, a DVD collection was published under the English title The Adventures of the Mole.
- From 2002 to 2004, a set of 60 DVDs entitled Nejlepších večerníčků (lit. 'best bedtime stories') was released, some of which included Little Mole animations. Included in the list below are the DVD numbers for films in this set.

Short films

Episode	English title	Czech title	Year	Duration	NV DVD #*
01.	How Mole Got His Trousers	Jak krtek ke kalhotkám přišel	1957	11:51	1
02.	The Mole and the Car	Krtek a autíčko	1963	14:30	19
03.	The Mole and the Rocket	Krtek a raketa	1965	08:40	
04.	The Mole and the Transistor Set	Krtek a tranzistor	1968	08:10	10
05.	The Mole and the Green Star	Krtek a zelená hvězda	1969	07:30	10,1
06.	The Mole and the Chewing Gum	Krtek a žvýkačka	1969	07:20	10
07.	The Mole in a Zoo	Krtek v zoo	1969	06:05	10
08.	The Mole as a Gardener	Krtek zahradníkem	1969	06:55	10,1
09.	The Mole and the Hedgehog	Krtek a ježek	1970	08:25	10
10.	The Mole and the Lollipop	Krtek a lízátko	1970	08:00	10,1
11.	The Mole and the TV	Krtek a televizor	1970	05:30	10
12.	The Mole and the Umbrella	Krtek a paraplíčko	1971	07:10	10,1
13.	The Mole as a Painter	Krtek malířem	1972	09:35	19
14.	The Mole and the Matches	Krtek a zápalky	1974	05:30	19
15.	The Mole and the Music	Krtek a muzika	1974	05:15	19
16.	The Mole and the Telephone	Krtek a telefon	1974	05:25	19
17.	The Mole as a Chemist	Krtek chemikem	1974	05:30	19
18.	The Mole and the Carpet	Krtek a koberec	1974	05:40	19
19.	The Mole as Watchmaker	Krtek hodinářem	1974	05:25	19
20.	The Mole at Christmas	Krtek o vánocích	1975	05:45	19
21.	The Mole as Photographer	Krtek fotografem	1975	05:45	19
22.	The Mole and the Egg	Krtek a vejce	1975	05:35	19
23.	The Mole and the Bulldozer	Krtek a buldozér	1975	05:43	19
24.	The Mole in the Desert	Krtek na poušti	1975	05:52	19
25.	The Mole and the Carnival	Krtek a karneval	1975	05:25	19
26.	The Mole and the Coal	Krtek a uhlí	1995	04:10	33
27.	The Mole and his Friends	Krtek a kamarádi	1995	05:18	33,1
28.	The Mole's Weekend	Krtek a víkend	1995	05:05	33
29.	The Mole and the Robot	Krtek a robot	1995	05:00	33,1
30.	The Mole and the Celebration	Krtek a oslava	1995	05:04	33
31.	The Mole and the Little Ducks	Krtek a kachničky	1995	05:00	33
32.	The Mole and the Subway	Krtek a metro	1997	05:00	44
33.	The Mole and the Mushrooms	Krtek a houby	1997	04:28	44
34.	The Mole and the Little Hare	Krtek a zajíček	1997	05:11	44
35.	The Mole and the Mother	Krtek a maminka	1997	05:20	44
36.	The Mole and the Little Mouse / The Mole and the Flood	Krtek a myška / Krtek a potopa	1997	05:19	44
37.	The Mole and the Snowman	Krtek a sněhulák	1998	05:09	44,1
38.	The Mole and the Flute	Krtek a flétna	1999	05:05	50,1
39.	The Mole and the Spring	Krtek a pramen	1999	05:33	50
40.	The Mole and the Grumbler	Krtek a šťoura	1999	05:21	50
41.	The Mole and the Swallow	Krtek a vlaštovka	2000	04:25	50
42.	The Mole and the Little Fish	Krtek a rybka	2000	05:02	50
43.	The Mole and the Little Frog	Krtek a žabka	2002	05:20	50,1

Feature films

Episode	English title	Czech title	Year	Duration	NV DVD #*
01.	The Mole in Town	Krtek ve městě	1982	28:31	33
02.	The Mole in a Dream	Krtek ve snu	1984	28:09	33
03.	The Mole and the Medicine	Krtek a medicína	1987	28:08	44
04.	The Mole as a Movie Star	Krtek filmová hvězda	1988	27:47	44
05.	The Mole and the Eagle	Krtek a orel	1992	28:05	50
06.	The Mole and the Clock	Krtek a hodiny	1994	28:04	50

Clips

Episode	English title	Czech title	Year	Duration
01.	The Mole on Vacation	Krtek a dovolená	1998	01:15
02.	The Mole and the Cottage	Krtek a domek	1998	00:48
03.	The Mole and the Cherries	Krtek a třešně	1998	00:39
04.	The Mole and the Snail	Krtek a šnek	1998	01:03
05.	The Mole and the Jewels	Krtek a šperky	1998	00:56
06.	The Mole and the TV	Krtek a televize	1998	00:39
07.	The Mole and the Little Frog	Krtek a žabka	1998	00:41
08.	The Mole as a Painter	Krtek malířem	1998	00:37
09.	The Mole and the Balloon	Krtek a balónek	1998	00:49
10.	The Mole and the Box	Krtek a krabice	1998	00:38
11.	The Mole and the Hat	Krtek a klobouk	1998	00:45
12.	The Mole and the Magician	Krtek a kouzelník	1998	00:36
13.	The Mole and the Duck	Krtek a kačenka	1998	00:38

== See also ==
- Czech animation
- Cinema of the Czech Republic
