= Pageant (magazine) =

20th-century monthly magazine

- Frequency: Monthly
- First issue: November 1944
- Final issue: February 1977

Pageant was a 20th-century monthly magazine published in the United States from November 1944 until February 1977. Printed in a digest size format, it became Coronet magazine's leading competition, although it aimed for comparison to Reader's Digest.

== History ==
Pageant was founded and first published by Hillman Periodicals. The first issue appeared in November 1944. Publisher Alex L. Hillman saw Pageant as a prestigious addition to his magazine line that included true confessions (Real Romances, Real Story, Real Confessions), crime titles (Crime Detective, Real Detective, Crime Confessions) and comic books, and he went to press for a 500,000 print run on his first issue. With an emphasis on visuals, Pageant often mixed glamour photo features with informative text on a wide range of subjects.

Pageant was purchased by Macfadden Publications in 1961 and published its last issue in February 1977.

== Editors ==
After six years editing The American Mercury, Eugene Lyons, the first U.S. correspondent to interview Joseph Stalin, signed on as Pageant's first editor, offering a solid line-up of articles. So did Vernon Pope who took over as editor in May 1945. Even so, with a circulation of 270,000, the adless Pageant lost $400,000 for its publisher in 1946-47, mainly due to rising printing and paper costs in the postwar era. Typical of that year's contents was the September 1947 issue with articles on "Babies Before Birth," Greece, New England, pianist Alec Templeton, the photography of Louise Dahl-Wolfe and an interview with Bernard Baruch.

Vernon Pope departed in 1947 and was replaced by a former Coronet managing editor, 30-year-old Harris Shevelson, who soon had the magazine turning a profit, with circulation climbing to 350,000 by March 1949, followed by a 400,000 print run for a wacky April Fool issue (April 1949).

== Link with Mad ==
Pageant indirectly figures into the history of Harvey Kurtzman's Mad, triggering the switch of Mad from a comic book to a magazine. In the early 1950s, Pageant did an article about the comic book Mad, illustrating it with an original double-page cartoon showing a parade of Mad characters. The drawing was created especially for Pageant by Kurtzman and Will Elder. Not long after that, Kurtzman received an offer to edit Pageant. Mad publisher Bill Gaines, in an interview with Steve Ringgenberg, explained what happened next:

I changed it because Harvey Kurtzman, my then editor, got a very lucrative offer from, I believe, Pageant magazine, and he had, prior to that time, evinced an interest in changing Mad into a magazine. At the time, I didn’t think I wanted to because I didn’t know anything about publishing magazines. I was a comics publisher. But, remembering this interest, when he got this offer I countered his offer by saying I would allow him to change Mad into a magazine, which proved to be a very lucky step for me. But that’s why it was changed. It was not changed to avoid the Code. Now, as a result of this, it did avoid the Code, but that’s not why I did it. If Harvey had not gotten that offer from Pageant, Mad probably never would have changed format.

September 1947 cover with Dorothy Malone

Shirley Bonne, an actress who appeared in the CBS comedy series My Sister Eileen (1960–61), appeared twice on the Pageant cover in the mid-1950s.

== Read Pageant ==
- Pageant (September 1953): "The 5 Marx Brothers and How They Shrank" by Sidney Carroll (full text)
- Pageant (January 1955): "My Favorite Case" by Jack Webb (full text)
- Pageant (February 1974): "Jet Set God" by Kathleen Jeremy (full text)
- Pageant (September 1976): "Loretta Swit" by Sylvia Resnick (full text)
