= People Today =

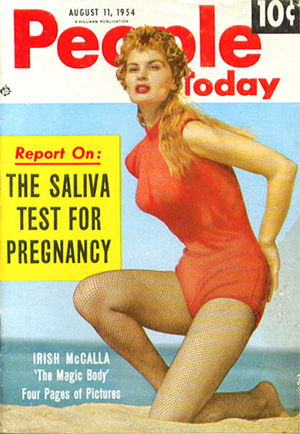
People Today cover, issue August 11, 1954.

People Today was an adult magazine founded in 1950.

The first issue was published on June 20, 1950 and featured Faye Emerson on the cover. People Today, a magazine about headline people was a pocket digest which was originally published bi-weekly by Weekly Publications Inc. based in Dayton, Ohio, and sold 10 cents. Weekly Publications Inc. was at that time the publisher of Newsweek and Today.

Purchased by Hillman Periodicals end of January 1951, the magazine was published from the 1950s to the 1970s, following the steps of Playboy and Modern Man. One of the unique characteristics of People Today was the attractive photos of beautiful, sexy women often scantily clothed on the front and back covers. Because of this, People Today soon became categorized as a risque or cheesecake periodical. People Today featured models, celebrities, the elite, news you can use and people in the know. The magazine featured many popular models such as Pat Sheehan, Mara Corday, Marilyn Monroe, Jayne Mansfield, Elizabeth Taylor, June Blair, and Jean Carroll. Subjects of the magazine included women, money, celebrities, and gossip.

The magazine was sold to P.T. Publications, Inc. (New York) and ceased publication in 1977.
