= Journey to Yourland =

- Directed by: Peter Budinský
- Written by: Peter Budinský, Barbora Budinská, Katarzyna Gondek
- Produced by: Peter Badač, Barbora Budinská
- Music by: Martin Hasák
- Production companies: plutoon BFILM.cz; The Pack; Radio and Television of Slovakia
- Distributed by: Forum Film
- Release date: 11 August 2022
- Running time: 86 minutes
- Countries: Slovakia; Czech Republic; Belgium
- Languages: Slovak; Czech
- Budget: 94 Million CZK (3.8 Million Euro)

Journey to Yourland (Slovak: Tvojazem or Czech: Cesta do Tvojzemí) is a 2022 co-production animated film directed by Slovak director Peter Budinský.

== Plot ==
Young Riki moves with his mother to a new place. He meets dangerous crows and a shiny rock with mysterious power. Riki is transported to Yourland where he meets a girl named Emma, an ape named Tidling and the mighty Metalman.
