= Electra (2023 film) =

- Directed by: Daria Kashcheeva
- Written by: Daria Kashcheeva
- Produced by: Zuzana Křivková; Martin Vandas
- Starring: Zuzana Částková; Marie Verner; Zuzana Stivínová; Robert Jašków
- Cinematography: Tomáš Frkal
- Edited by: Alexander Kashcheev
- Music by: Lucas Verreman
- Production companies: MAUR film FAMU International; Papy3D Productions; Artichoke Film Production
- Distributed by: Arte
- Release date: 24 May 2023 (Cannes)
- Running time: 27 minutes
- Countries: Czech Republic; France; Slovakia
- Language: English

Electra is a Czech short film, directed by Daria Kashcheeva and released in 2023. Blending live action and animation, the film revisits the theme of father-daughter relationships first explored in her 2019 film Daughter, portraying the experiences of a woman who is recalling her strained and distant relationship with her father.

The film's cast includes Zuzana Částková as Electra, Marie Verner as Electra in childhood, and Zuzana Stivínová and Robert Jašków as Electra's parents.

The film premiered at the 2023 Cannes Film Festival. It was later screened at the 2023 Toronto International Film Festival, where it won the award for Best International Short Film.
