= Vlasta Pospíšilová =

Czech animator, director and screenwriter (1935–2022)

- Born: 18 February 1935; Prague, Czechoslovakia
- Died: 15 April 2022 (aged 87)
- Education: School of Applied Arts
- Known for: Animation

Vlasta Pospíšilová (18 February 1935 – 15 April 2022) was a Czech animator, director and screenwriter.

== Life and career ==
Vlasta Pospíšilová was born on 18 February 1935 in Prague, Czechoslovakia as Vlasta Jurajdova. She attended and graduated from the Higher Professional School of Applied Art in Prague. Since 1956, she worked as an assistant animator at the Puppet Film Studio in Prague, later at the Jiří Trnka Studio. As an animator, she became famous for The Cybernetic Grandma, Jan Werich's fairy tale Fimfárum, as a screenwriter and director for the series Broučci and worked as a director's consent of the series Pat & Mat. She's also work in directing films and animating films with her friend, Alfons Mensdorff-Pouilly (notably, Faustus house [Faustův dům] which is directed by Garik Seko) or Jan Klos (especially Motyli cas.)

She was awarded the Lifetime Achievement Award at the Anifilm International Animated Film Festival in Třeboň in May 2015.
