= Mythepolis =

Ancient Town

Mythepolis (Ancient Greek: Μυθήπολις) or Mythopolis (Μυθόπολις) was a town in ancient Bithynia probably situated on the northwest side of the Lacus Ascania. It is said that during the winter all the artificial wells of the place were completely drained of water, but that in summer they became filled again to the brim. Pliny the Elder and Stephanus of Byzantium mention a town Pythopolis in Mysia which may be the same.

If Mythepolis is not the same as Pythopolis, its site is unlocated.
