= Broučci =

Czech children's book by Jan Karafiát

Illustration of Broučci by Jiří Trnka

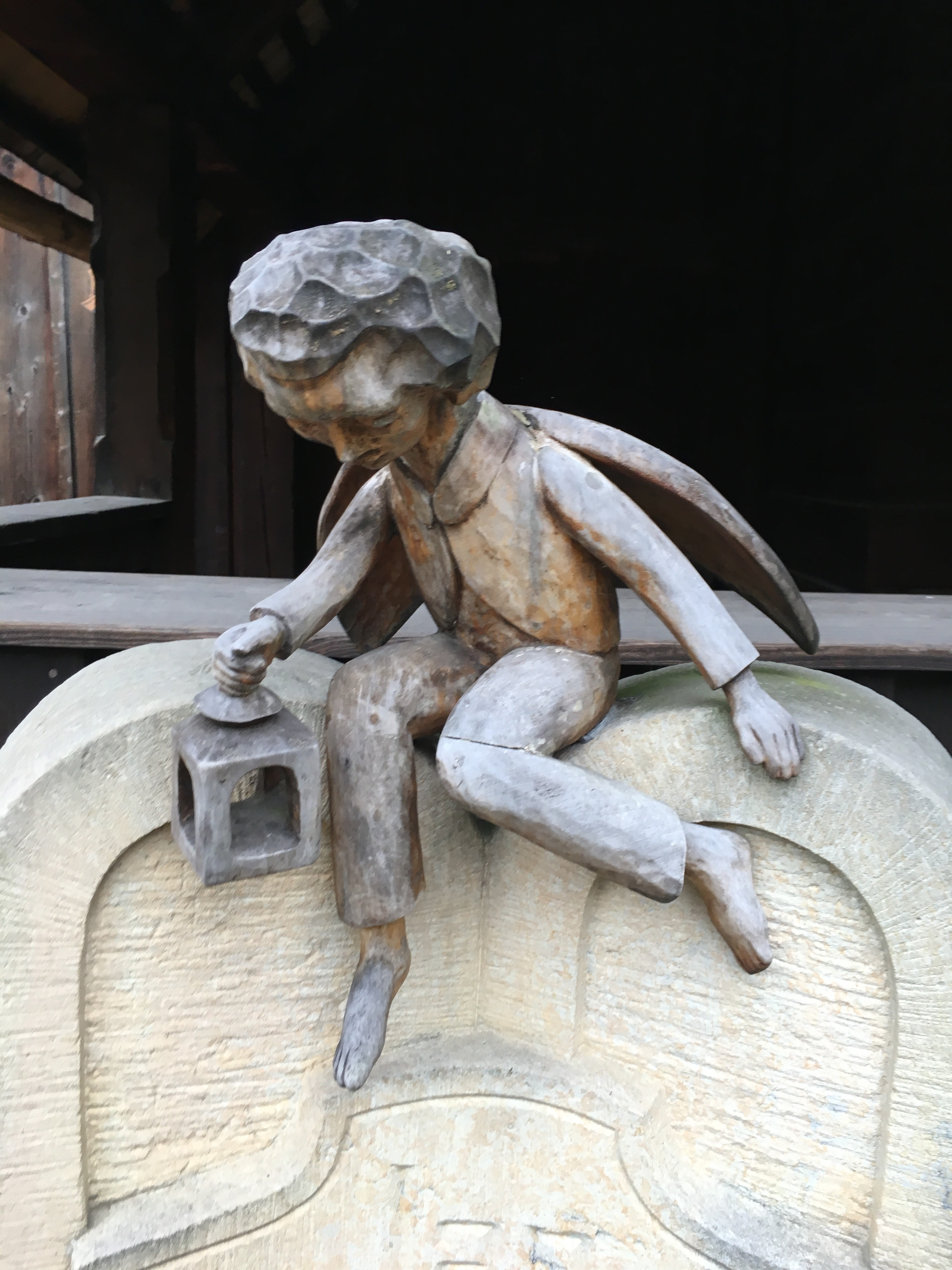
A carving on Jan Karafiát's headstone.

Broučci is a children's book by Jan Karafiát published in Czech kingdom in the early 1870s. The title is the Czech word for beetles, and the word is also used for "traditional Czech figures of fairylike insect people" such as the characters in the book. In English, the title is often translated as Fireflies.

== Background ==
Jan Karafiàt was encouraged by a Miss Johanna Dennistoun Buchanan of Auchentorlie Estate, Bowling to write the story while he was on a visit to Scotland. Auchentorlie bridge, where the conversation took place now has a plaque commemorating the event.

Originally published anonymously in 1876 as Broučci pro malé i velké děti (Fireflies for Small and Big Children), the first edition received very little acclaim. It was re-discovered and popularized in 1893 by publicist Gustav Jaroš (Gamma). He published an unsigned review in the magazine Čas (Time), and started an unusual and long-lasting wave of popularity for the book. Jaroš later called Broučci "perhaps the most beautiful blossom of the Czech children literature". After the review, the first edition was quickly sold out and the book was reprinted in 1894 and many times since.

Only with the 10th edition of the book, published in 1912, was the book published under the name of its author, Jan Karafiát. By 1942, the book was translated into English. By 2004, 80 editions had been published in Czech.

Broučci is considered a classic Czech children's book. However, the critical reception was not always positive. Along with Karafiát's poetic and imaginative style, the work contains elements of moralistic conservatism, caused by the conviction of the author - a Calvinist clergyman - of a necessity to spend a life "in obedience and resignation to the will of God". It has been acclaimed for its imaginative storyline and natural lyricism, connected with humanity and poetic interpretations of an imaginary world seen through children's eyes.

The book has been adapted in several animated films. In 1967, Libuše Koutná made an eight-part puppet TV series called simply Broučci, and Koutna also did her works in 1984 show, Pribehy vcelich medviku. In the 1995, a new series featuring stop motion was published under the same title directed by Vlasta Pospisilova.

Czech puppet maker and illustrator Jiří Trnka created one of the most adored illustration sets for the book. The story of the fireflies also inspired a composition by Václav Trojan. During World War II, the inmates of the Nazi Theresienstadt concentration camp dramatized and performed their own version of the book. The last performance in Theresienstadt was canceled because the inmates of the concentration camp had to help harassed and tormented new inmates arriving in overloaded transport.

== English translation ==
- Jan Karafiát, Fireflies, translated by Rose Fyleman, illustrations by Emil Weiss, Allen & Unwin (London, England), 1942.
