= Punch and Judy Comics =

1944–1951 humorous comic book series

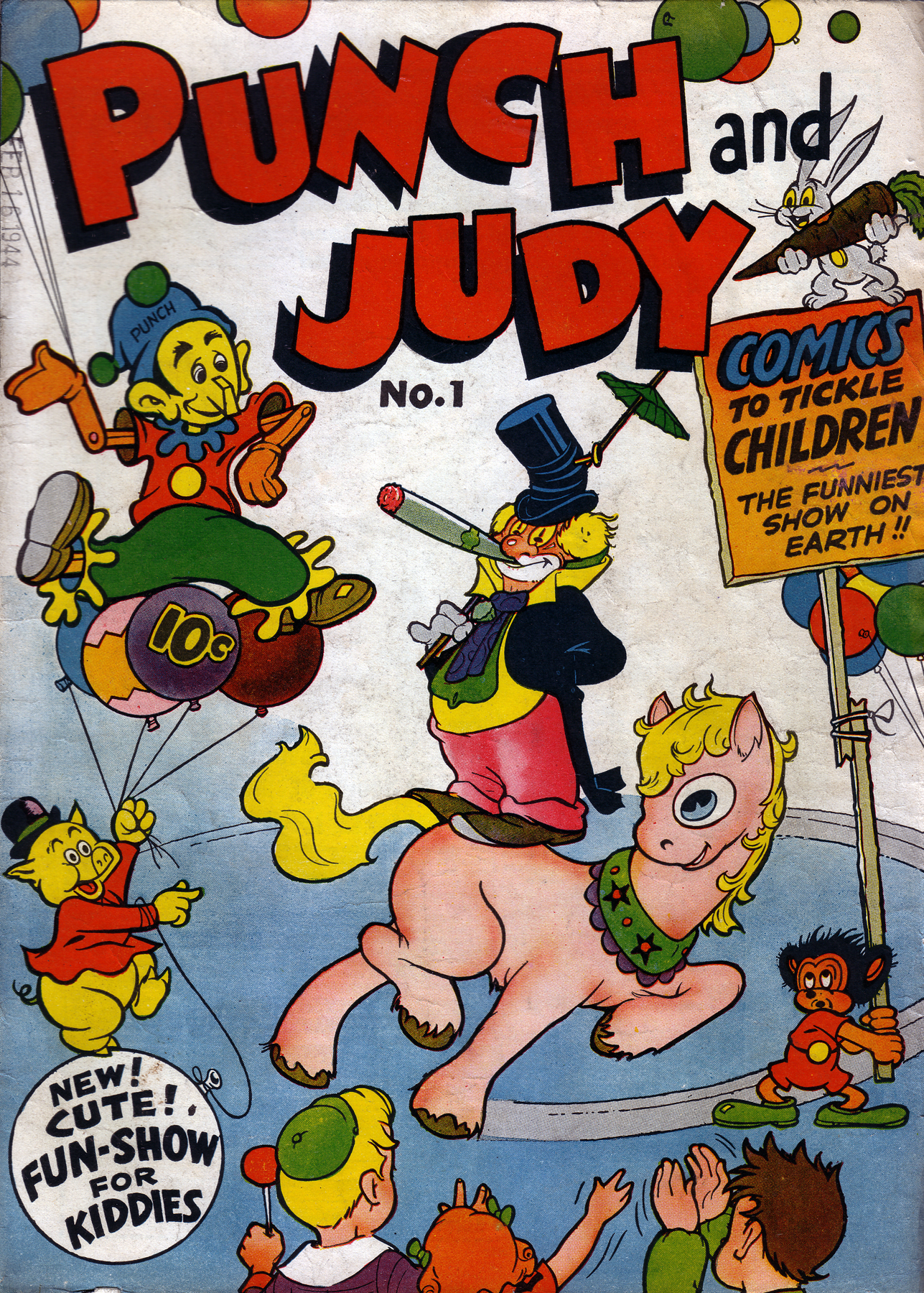
Punch and Judy Comics vol. 1, #1 1944

Punch and Judy Comics is a golden age comic book series in the humor genre, which also contains many stories in the cartoon animal genre. The series was published by Hillman Periodicals from 1944 to December 1951, and ran for 32 issues, in three volumes. The series is most notable for showcasing some early talking-animal work of comic book writer/artist Jack Kirby, who provided two characters for the book, Lockjaw the Alligator and Earl the Rich Rabbit.

The main feature concerns a living marionette named Punch, who is created by a genial toymaker named Uncle Tony, and the puppet's best friend, a blonde-haired girl named Judy. The strip draws for inspiration more from Pinocchio than typical Punch and Judy puppet performances. The artist on the first issue and the probable creator of the series was Joe Oriolo, who had recently worked for Fleischer Studios and created Casper the Friendly Ghost.

Other features include Fatsy McPig, Captain Catfish and Buttons the Rabbit; and Little Horsefeathers, a humor strip about a hapless Native American boy, in the “Little Hiawatha” mode.

All Hillman periodical publications are in the public domain and have been often reprinted by various companies, including Eclipse Comics with Airboy and The Complete Jack Kirby reprints. The comics entered the public domain 28 years after their first printing, and the copyrights were never renewed for the second term of 28 years available.

Issue number 9 of volume one does not seem to exist, but issues 8 and 10 do.

According to the Grand Comics Database: "Vol. 1/#7 is February 1947; V1/#8 is March 1947 in indicia, but April is listed on cover; V1/#10 is May 1946. Does V1/#9 exist? None of the Punch and Judy collectors known have a copy."
