= My Date Comics =

American comic series (1947–1948)

Publication information
- Publisher: Hillman Periodicals
- Schedule: bi-monthly
- Genre: Romantic comedy
- Publication date: Jul 1947 – Jan 1948
- No. of issues: 4

Creative team
- Created by: Simon and Kirby
- Inker(s): Simon

My Date Comics was a short-lived comics series that ran from July 1947 to January 1948. The title was the first in the "romance humor" genre. It was a collaboration between Joe Simon and Jack Kirby.

They mainly concerned Swifty Chase, a lovestruck athlete who competed with rival Snubby Skeemer for the hand of Sunny Daye.

The most colourful character was House-Date Harry, a lanky teen who preferred to entertain his dates in their homes and not go out.
