= The Torchbearer =

- Film poster
- Directed by: Václav Švankmajer
- Written by: Václav Švankmajer
- Edited by: Martin Knejp
- Music by: Ondřej Ježek
- Distributed by: Bionaut
- Release date: 2005
- Running time: 25 minutes
- Country: Czech Republic
- Language: Czech

The Torchbearer (Czech: Světlonoš) is a 2005 Czech animated short film written and directed by Václav Švankmajer. It is described as an allegorical story about rise to power.

Švankmajer worked on the film for 5 years in his family studio Athanor. He mixed a medieval legend with fantasy genre and also used some techniques known from video games. The film was influenced by films of Jan Švankmajer, the father of Václav Švankmajer. The Torchbearer has won multiple awards.

== Plot ==
The film starts with a Town with a huge labyrinth and emperor sitting in his throne. A never-ending circle of day and night occurs. The emperor dies one day and the circle stops until the new emperor is selected. A hero enters the town. He comes to a hall full of statues of women. He leaves the hall and enters the labyrinth. The statues come to life behind Hero's back and enter the labyrinth where they set three traps for him.

The hero gets to a place where are two doors with a guillotine hanging behind these doors. There is also a statue that controls the doors and guillotine. The statue doesn't let the hero go through the door unless he gets hit by the guillotine. The hero hesitates until a group of rats stripping a bone in a cloth appear. One of these rats attack the hero and is thrown at the statue. The rat destroys the statue and the hero is allowed to progress further.

The hero gets to an arena and is attacked by a flying monster that is controlled by statues. A great battle occurs. The hero gets some damage and the monster gets the upper hand but the hero manages to cut one of strings that statues use to control the monster. The monster falls and wriggles in agony. The hero brutally kills the monster and progresses further.

The hero gets to the third trap which are quickly moving walls. He tries to get through the trap but fails and almost dies. He eventually notices a hole in a wall. He sees two statues that control the moving walls. The hero kills one of these statues while the other runs away.

The hero enters a huge doors behind the trap and gets to a hall full of statues that welcome him with trumpets. He sees a white curtain on the other side of hall. He goes closer and a huge throne appears from behind the curtain. emperor's skeleton is seen sitting in the throne. Two statues throw him out of the throne and rats appear to drag emperor's body away. The hero takes emperor's place and is crowned the new emperor. He sits in the throne but suddenly multiple Hypodermic needles appear and impale him. The throne disappears behind the curtain. Audience can see the hero's blood flowing into a heart that starts beating which sets a machine to work and a circle of day and night occurs once again. The film ends with a scene very similar to the one it started with.

== Reception ==
The film has won an award at a student film festival Fresh Film Fest Karlovy Vary for the Best animated film in 2005. The Film also gained an Honorable mention.

The Torchbearer also won Kristián Award for the best animated film at Febiofest 2006.

The Film was shown at Anifilm Festival in 2012. The film was likened to works by Jan Švankmajer, the father of Václav Švakmajer.
