= Daughter (2019 film) =

- Directed by: Daria Kashcheeva
- Written by: Daria Kashcheeva
- Produced by: Zuzana Roháčová, Ondřej Šejnoha, Martin Vandas
- Cinematography: Daria Kashcheeva
- Edited by: Alexander Kashcheev
- Music by: Petr Vrba
- Production companies: FAMU - Film and TV School of the Academy of Performing Arts in Prague, MAUR film
- Distributed by: Miyu Distribution
- Release date: 12 June 2019
- Running time: 15 minutes
- Country: Czech Republic
- Budget: 750,000 CZK

Daughter (Czech: Dcera) is a 2019 Czech short animated drama film directed by Daria Kashcheeva. The film received 38 awards during half a year after its premiere at the Annecy International Animation Film Festival, including the Annecy Cristal for the best film in the graduation films category, and a Student Academy Award (Student Oscar). It was also nominated for the Academy Award for Best Animated Short Film.

== Plot ==
The film is told without words. It is about the complicated relationship of a young woman with her father. She meets with him in a hospital room where she remembers her childhood and complicated relationship with her father and how they parted ways until they meet again and finally reconcile.

== Background ==
Daughter is the product of the director's longtime interest in psychology, relationships, and the lasting imprint of childhood experiences. The film tells a complicated story about the relationship between a father and his daughter. Kashcheeva invented hand held camera movement for her film, which was never used before in stop-motion.

== Style ==
For Kashcheeva, part of the challenge of creating Daughter stemmed from her desire to bring a dirty, imperfect, documentary feel to a stop-motion world. The aesthetic she aimed for was inspired, in part, by Dogme 95 and films by the Dardenne brothers.

== Awards ==
Year	Event	Award	Category	Result	Ref(s)
2019	46th Annual Student Academy Awards	Student Academy Awards	International Film Schools: Animation	Won	
2019	Annecy International Animation Film Festival	Cristal for a Graduation Film		Won	
2019	Annecy International Animation Film Festival	Junior Jury Award for a Graduation Film		Won	
2019	Fantoche International Animation Film Festival	Best Film		Won	
2019	Melbourne International Film Festival	City Post Award	Best Animation Short Film	Won	
2020	2020 Sundance Film Festival	Jury Award	Best Short Film	Won	
2020	27th Czech Lion Awards	Magnesie Award	Best Student Film	Won	
2020	92nd Academy Awards	Academy Awards	Best Animated Short Film	Nominated	

== See also ==
- 2019 in film
- List of Czech animated films
