= Punch and Judy (film) =

1906 French silent comedy film

- Directed by: Georges Méliès
- Production company: Star Film Company
- Release date: 1906
- Running time: 40 meters/140 feet Approx. 2.5 minutes (14 fps)
- Country: France
- Language: Silent

Punch and Judy (French: L'Anarchie chez Guignol) was a 1906 French silent comic trick film directed by Georges Méliès.

== Plot ==
Surviving fragment of Punch and Judy, 1906

A group of children are watching a puppet show in an outdoor booth (identified as Guignol in the French release and Punch and Judy in the English one). The puppets are engaging in knockabout farce, battling with sticks, when in their excitement they jump off the puppet stage and become miniature people fighting on the ground. The puppet master, rushing out of the booth, tries frantically to herd the puppets back to the stage, but they grow to human size and get him entangled in their brawl. The puppets finally escape for good, and the delighted children rush upon the puppet master and bury him in a shower of confetti.

== Release ==
The film was released by Méliès's Star Film Company and is numbered 871–873 in its catalogues. The complete film is currently presumed lost, though a brief fragment was relocated in time for a 2008 DVD release.
