= Pérák, the Spring Man of Prague =

Figure from Czechoslovak folklore

Pérák, the Spring Man (Czech pronunciation: [ˈpɛːraːk]), was an urban legend and rumour most popular in the Czechoslovak city of Prague during the German occupation of Czechoslovakia in the midst of World War II. In the decades following the war, Pérák has also been portrayed as a Czech superhero.

== History ==
According to historians Callum McDonald and Jan Kaplan in their book Prague in the Shadow of the Swastika: a History of the German Occupation 1939–1945, "the Springer" was said to leap out from shadowy alleys and startle passers-by. Oral tradition suggests that some of Pérák's leaps were of an extraordinary magnitude, including the act of jumping over train carriages, similar to England's Spring-heeled Jack.

A contemporary and possibly associated rumour concerned a "Razor Blade Man" who was said to slash at victims with razors attached to his fingers.

Researcher Mike Dash quotes George Zenaty, a noted authority on the policing of Prague during the war years, that:

…in 1940–1942, none of our police precincts in Prague informed us in their daily reports of the existence of a 'Spring Man'. This does not mean that such rumours might not have circulated; however, it would have been impossible to include [them] in the reports without tangible proof.

In 2015, a social activist claiming the identity of Pérák fronted a guerilla media campaign to commemorate the former site of the Lety concentration camp.

The 2022 book "Spring Man. A Belief Legend between Folklore and Popular Culture" by Czech folklorist and anthropologist Petr Janeček published by the Lexington Books offers a comprehensive survey of the Perak phenomenon, tracing a history from the figure of Spring Heeled Jack in England during the early 19th century through to Czech folklore before, during and after World War II, and then into popular culture via a succession of speculative fiction novels, comic book treatments and other works of fiction. It also present similar comparative examples of folkloric urban phantoms connected with the Czech Pérák, including ones in Russia and Ukraine in the 1920s and the 1940s, one in Slovakia in the 1940s, and ones in Germany in the 1950s. Janeček also published an extensive book in Czech, "Mýtus o perakovi. Městská legenda mezi folklorem a populární kulturou", in 2017, and a short English article about Pérák in the scholarly journal Fabula in 2020.

== Pérák in fiction ==
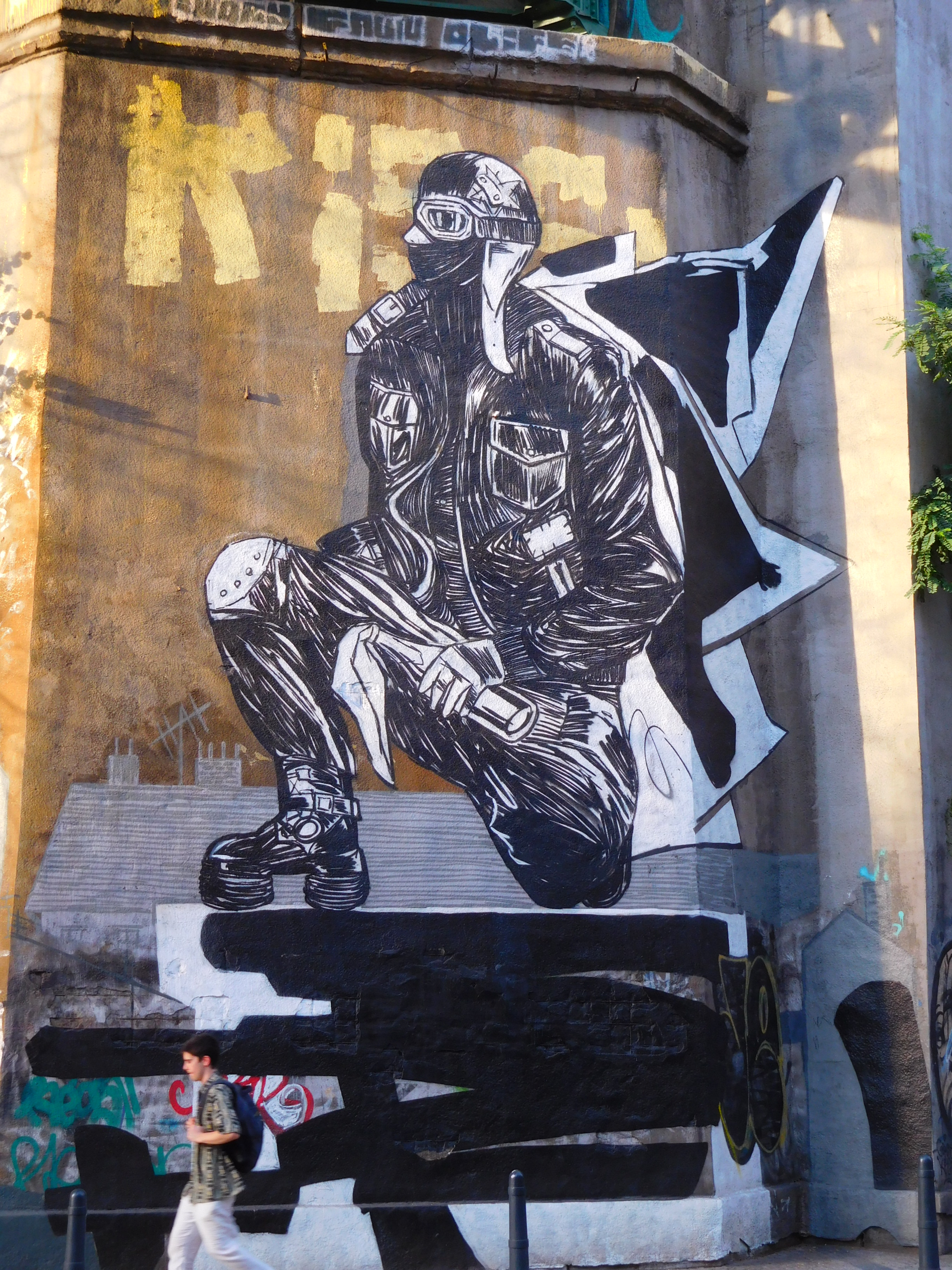
Pérák in Žižkov

=== Film ===
A 14-minute 1946 Czechoslovak animated cartoon Pérák a SS (Springman and the SS, also released in English-speaking markets as The Chimney Sweep) was created by the renowned Czech animator Jiří Trnka and film-maker Jiří Brdečka. It portrayed Pérák as a heroic and mischievous black-clad chimney sweep, with a mask fashioned out of a sock. He was capable of performing fantastic leaps due to having couch springs attached to his shoes. Pérák taunted German Army sentries, the Gestapo and, particularly, a Hitleresque Nazi collaborator before escaping in a surrealistic, slapstick chase across the darkened city, ultimately freeing a number of incarcerated citizens of Prague.

Trnka's postwar interpretation of Pérák as a quasi-superhero, defying the curfew and the authority of the German occupying forces, formed the basis for sporadic revivals of the character in Czech science fiction and comic book stories.

In 2013, the short feature film Pérák (Pérák: Gott mit uns) was directed by Pavel Soukup. It is in the noir/mystery genre.

In 2016, Marek Berger created an animated film Pérák: Stín nad Prahou (Pérák: The Shadow over Prague). The film won 2 awards at International Student Film Festival in Opava – for best animated film and absolute best film.

=== Literature ===
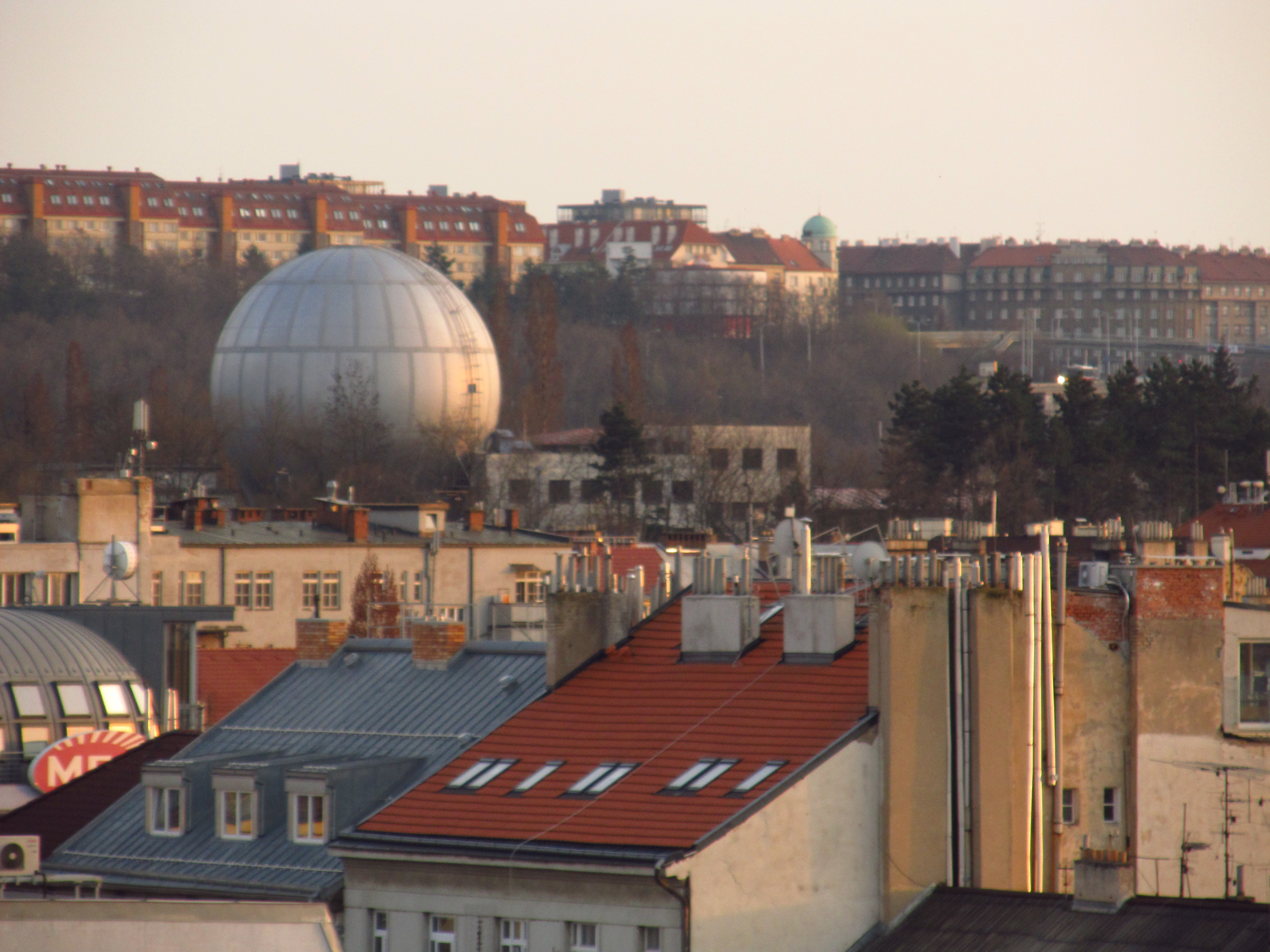
In Petr Stančík's fiction, the Libeň gasholder serves as a base for Pérák

In 1948, the figure was used in a newspaper propaganda comics in Haló noviny. It was visually based on Trnka's animated film. Fifteen pages were published.

In 1961, Pérák was featured as a heroic character in the story "Pérový muž" ("The Spring-Man"), which was written by Czech science fiction writer Jan Weiss and published as part of a collection of short stories entitled Bianka Braselli, A Two-Headed Lady. In his 1997 biographical essay on Weiss, Vilém Kmuníček speculated that the inspiration for this story was in response to Nazi propaganda:

In 1968, the issue of the Mladý svět magazine, published after the Warsaw Pact invasion of Czechoslovakia, included a four-strip comics titled Pérák and the USSR.

In 1986, Czech science fiction writer Ondřej Neff also portrayed Pérák as a heroic figure in Pérák – Toho dne byla mlha (Perak – There was fog that day). In 2001, he created a humorous satirical comic strip titled Pérák kontra Globeman (Pérák versus Globalman) which conflates the figures of the Springer and the Razor Blade Man and pits him against a villain called Globalman, who bears a strong resemblance to McDonald's mascot Ronald McDonald.

In 2002, the cartoonist Adolf Lachman, in cooperation with scriptwriters Monge and Morten, intended to produce a new series of comic strips about Pérák. But only the introductory chapter came out as part of the KomiksFest! Revue 03 magazine.

Ethnologist Petr Janeček has been dedicated to scientific research of Pérák since 2004; he has collected a considerable number of stories from witnesses. In 2017, he issued a comprehensive publication Mýtus o Pérákovi. Městská legenda mezi folklorem a populární kulturou (Myth of Pérák. Urban legend between folklore and popular culture).

The right to use the name Pérák was in 2006 ensured by Petr Stančík. First, he wrote a screenplay to movie, but in 2008 only a book with its fictionalized version was published by the author, portraying him as a World War II-era costumed superhero who battles the Gestapo with the aid of various weapons and mechanical spring-powered boots. In 2019, the book was translated into German and published as Pérák. Der Superheld aus Prag.

Since spring 2018, comics about Pérák have been published in the Czech ABC magazine; its authors are artist Petr Kopl and screenwriter Petr Macek. Their portrayal of Pérák follows the character's appearance in their comics magazine Dechberoucí Zázrak 09 (Breathtaking Miracle 09). In May 2019, the collected and extended edition of the series, originally published in ABC magazine, was released as a separate book Pérák: Oko budoucnosti (Pérák: Eye of the future).

=== Theater ===
Since 2011, the Vosto5 Theater in Prague has been presenting an action historical fiction called Pérák – na jméně nezáleží, rozhodují činy!. The plot is placed in the real historical context of the period from the arrival of Reich Protector Reinhard Heydrich to Prague, until his assassination. In this production, Vosto5 combines elements of martial arts and extreme sports with a typical theater poetics and its verbal humor.

=== Videogames ===
In August 2023, a platform video game Pérák a legendy Prahy was released on Microsoft Windows.

== See also ==
- Spring-heeled Jack
- Mad Gasser of Mattoon
- Ghost of Kyiv
- Colonel Tomb
- Juba (sniper)
- Simo Häyhä
