= Zdeněk Miler =

Czech animator and illustrator (1921–2011)

- Born: 21 February 1921; Kladno, Czechoslovakia
- Died: 30 November 2011 (aged 90); Nová Ves pod Pleší, Czech Republic
- Resting place: Vyšehrad Cemetery
- Occupations: Cartoonist, film director
- Writing career
- Language: Czech
- Genre: Children's fiction
- Notable work: Krtek

Zdeněk Miler (Czech pronunciation: [ˈzdɛɲɛk ˈmɪlɛr]; 21 February 1921 – 30 November 2011) was a Czech animator and illustrator best known for his Mole (Krtek or Krteček in original) character and its adventures.

== Early years ==
Miler was born in Kladno just west of Prague, the capital of what was then Czechoslovakia. He became an animator partly because of the Nazi occupation of Czechoslovakia. He took part in the demonstrations held consequent to the death of Jan Opletal, which led to the closing of universities and colleges. He escaped being sent to a concentration camp and instead wound up working as an animator.

Miler enjoyed painting as a child. His hobby developed when he joined the national graphic school in Prague in 1942. He later studied at the College of Arts and Crafts (Uměleckoprůmyslová škola Praha). In 1948, he began work at the cartoon studio Baťa in Zlín. There, he learned the important practical skills relating to film production, specializing in animated films. After the Second World War, he started work at the cartoon company Bratři v triku and worked first as draughtsman, then author and director. He later became the head of the company.

In 2001, Miler announced that he would no longer be making more films, citing health reasons.

== Death ==
On 30 November 2011, Miler died at a nursing home, aged 90. Miler was cremated on the day after his death, and he is interred in Prague's Vyšehrad Cemetery, near the Slavín tomb.

== Krtek (the mole) ==
Miler made about 70 films. In approximately fifty of them, the protagonist was his most famous creation, the small mole (Krtek in Czech). The idea for its creation came when he was commissioned to make an educational film for children in 1956. He was not happy with the script he was given. Since he was strongly influenced by the films of Walt Disney, he looked for an animal as the main character. Later, he said that the idea to use a mole as his main character came to him when he stumbled over a mole hill during a walk. The first film was titled Jak krtek ke kalhotkám přišel (How the mole got his trousers), which won a Silver Lion at the Venice Film Festival. In the beginning, the mole spoke, but Miler wanted his creation to be understood everywhere in the world, so he decided to use his daughters as voice actors, reducing the speech to short non-figurative exclamations in order to express Krtek's feelings and world perception. His daughters were also his test audience, who got to see the films first. Thus, Miler could see whether his message resonated with children.

Krtek was a huge success in Czechoslovakia, Eastern Europe, and Germany from the beginning, and today Krtek can be seen in over eighty countries.

== Works ==
=== Krtek ===
Episode	English title	Czech title	Year	Duration	NV DVD #*
01.	How Mole Got His Trousers	Jak krtek ke kalhotkám přišel	1957	11:51	1
02.	Mole and the Car	Krtek a autíčko	1963	14:30	19
03.	Mole and the Rocket	Krtek a raketa	1965	08:40	
04.	Mole and the Transistor Set	Krtek a tranzistor	1968	08:10	10
05.	Mole and the Green Star	Krtek a zelená hvězda	1969	07:30	10,1
06.	Mole and the Chewing Gum	Krtek a žvýkačka	1969	07:20	10
07.	Mole in a Zoo	Krtek v Zoo	1969	06:05	10
08.	Mole as a Gardener	Krtek zahradníkem	1969	06:55	10,1
09.	Mole and the Hedgehog	Krtek a ježek	1970	08:25	10
10.	Mole and the Lollipop	Krtek a lízátko	1970	08:00	10,1
11.	Mole and the TV	Krtek a televizor	1970	05:30	10
12.	Mole and the Umbrella	Krtek a paraplíčko	1971	07:10	10,1
13.	Mole as a Painter	Krtek malířem	1972	09:35	19
14.	Mole and the Matches	Krtek a zápalky	1974	05:30	19
15.	Mole and the Music	Krtek a muzika	1974	05:15	19
16.	Mole and the Telephone	Krtek a telefon	1974	05:25	19
17.	Mole as a Chemist	Krtek chemikem	1974	05:30	19
18.	Mole and the Carpet	Krtek a koberec	1974	05:40	19
19.	Mole as Watchmaker	Krtek hodinářem	1974	05:25	19
20.	Mole at Christmas	Krtek o Vánocích	1975	05:45	19
21.	Mole as Photographer	Krtek fotografem	1975	05:45	19
22.	Mole and the Egg	Krtek a vejce	1975	05:35	19
23.	Mole and the Bulldozer	Krtek a buldozér	1975	05:43	19
24.	Mole in the Desert	Krtek na poušti	1975	05:52	19
25.	Mole and the Carnival	Krtek a karneval	1975	05:25	19
26.	Mole in Town	Krtek ve městě	1982	28:31	33
27.	Mole in a Dream	Krtek ve snu	1984	28:09	33
28.	Mole and the Medicine	Krtek a medicína	1987	28:08	44
29.	Mole as a Movie Star	Krtek filmová hvězda	1988	27:47	44
30.	Mole and the Eagle	Krtek a orel	1992	28:05	50
31.	Mole and the Clock	Krtek a hodiny	1994	28:04	50
32.	Mole and the Coal	Krtek a uhlí	1995	04:10	33
33.	Mole and His Friends	Krtek a kamarádi	1995	05:18	33,1
34.	Mole's Weekend	Krtek a víkend	1995	05:05	33
35.	Mole and the Robot	Krtek a robot	1995	05:00	33,1
36.	Mole's and the Celebration	Krtek a oslava	1995	05:04	33
37.	Mole and the Little Ducks	Krtek a kachničky	1995	05:00	33
38.	Mole and the Subway	Krtek a metro	1997	05:00	44
39.	Mole and the Mushrooms	Krtek a houby	1997	04:28	44
40.	Mole and the Little Mouse	Krtek a myška	1997	05:19	44
41.	Mole and the Little Hare	Krtek a zajíček	1997	05:11	44
42.	Mole and the Mother	Krtek a maminka	1997	05:20	44
43.	Mole and the Flood	Krtek a potopa	1997	05:04	
44.	Mole and the Snowman	Krtek a sněhulák	1998	05:09	44,1
45.	Mole on Vacation	Krtek a dovolená	1998	01:15	
46.	Mole and cottage	Krtek a domek	1998		
47.	Mole and the chicks	Krtek a tresne	1998		
48.	Mole and snail	Krtek a šnek	1998		
49.	Mole and jewels	Krtek a sperky	1998		
50.	Mole and tv	Krtek a televize	1998		
51.	Mole and the Little Frog	Krtek a žabka	1998		
52.	Mole and painter	Krtek a malirem	1998		
53.	Mole and balloon	Krtek a balonek	1998		
54.	Mole and box	Krtek a krabice	1998		
55.	Mole and hat	Krtek a klobouk	1998		
56.	Mole magician	Krtek kouzelnik	1998		
57.	Mole and duck	Krtek a kacenka	1998		
58.	Mole and the Flute	Krtek a flétna	1999	05:05	50,1
59.	Mole and the Spring	Krtek a pramen	1999	05:33	50
60.	Mole and the Grumbler	Krtek a šťoura	1999	05:21	50
61.	Mole and the Swallow	Krtek a vlaštovka	2000	04:25	50
62.	Mole and the Little Fish	Krtek a rybka	2000	05:02	50
63.	Mole and the Little Frog	Krtek a žabka	2002	05:20	50,1

=== Other films ===
Year	Czech title	English title
1948	O milionáři, který ukradl slunce	The Millionaire Who Stole the Sun
1958	Měsíční pohádka	Moon Story
1960	Jak štěňátko dostalo chuť na med	How the Puppy Wanted Honey
1960	O štěňátku	About the Puppy
1960	Jak štěňátko chtělo malé pejsky	How the Puppy Wanted Little Dogs
1960	Jak sluníčko vrátilo štěňátku vodu	How the Sun Gave the Puppy Water Back
1961	O nejbohatším vrabci ve světě	About the World's Richest Sparrow
1963	Rudá stopa	Red Footprint
1963	O Čtverečkovi a Trojúhelníčkovi	About the Square and the Triangle
1968	Sametka	The Velvet Caterpillar
1977	Romance helgolandská	A Heligoland Romance
1978	Cvrček a stroj	The Cricket and the Machine
1978	Cvrček a pavouk	The Cricket and the Spider
1978	Cvrček a housličky	The Cricket and the Violin
1979	Cvrček a slepice	The Cricket and the Chicken
1979	Cvrček a pila	The Cricket and the Saw
1979	Cvrček a bombardón	The Cricket and the Bomber
1979	Cvrček a basa	The Cricket and the Double Bass
