= Karel Dodal =

Karel Dodal (21 January 1900 – 6 July 1986) was a Czech advertising filmmaker, animator, animated film director and producer and founder of animation in Czechoslovakia. Together with Irena Dodalová they founded IRE-film company, which produced first animated advertising films and independent animations of the 1930s.

== Life ==
Karel Dodal was born in Prague, Bohemia, Austria-Hungary (today the Czech Republic) on 21 January 1900. After World War I he was trained as a varnisher, soon he got his first job as a backdrops painter in theatre and film studio Urania, Prague. In mid 1920s he became animator and special effects assistant in Elekta Journal studio, creating graphs, animated backgrounds and film tricks.

== Work ==
In Elekta Journal Dodal created his first animations (unreleased film A Water Sprite in Love) and met his first wife and collaborator Hermína Týrlová. In mid 30's they produced 2 films together – Bimbo's Unfortunate Adventure and Tommy and Merimaid, inspired by American cartoons and animations, such as Felix the Cat). In the late 30's Elekta Journal policy in cinema advertisement changed, Dodal and Týrlová were fired and unsuccessfully tried to establish their own animation film studio. Couple divorced shortly after. Soon Karel Dodal met her future wife and collaborator Irena Leschnerová (born Rosnerová, later Irena Dodalová). They married in 1933 and founded a new animation studio IRE-film in Prague. Týrlová, Dodal's first wife was their first emploee and animator.

In 1935 he received first big contract to make an animation advertisement from Czechoslovak broadcast company Radiojournal. The film was called The Adventures of a Ubiquitous Fellow (Všudybylova dobrodružství) and became a successful start of their career, which lasted until 1938. Within 5 years they created more than 30 advertising films, which include Fantasie érotique (1936) or A Thoughts Penetrating Light (Myšlenka hledající světlo, 1938).

Dodal had to close their studio due to financial crisis in 1938. He moved to the United States, his wife Irena was transported to Theresienstadt Ghetto. They met after World War II in the United States. As they were not successful in continuation of their animation film production, they moved to Argentina, where they were offered jobs. Dodal moved without his wife to the United States, where he became a university film professor until his retirement.

Dodal died on 6 July 1986 Fort Lee, New Jersey.

== Filmography ==
- 1927: Felix the Cat Has an Accident
- 1927: Felix the Cat Receives a Lesson
- 1927: The New Adventures of Felix the Cat
- 1928: A Water Sprite in Love
- 1928: What Felix the Cat Does Every Afternoon
- 1929: How Felix the Cat Supported the Ostrava Region
- 1929: Bimbo’s Unfortunate Adventure
- 1929: A Cabin Boy on Salty Water
- 1930: Tommy and the Mermaid
- 1934: The Duties of Life
- 1936: The Adventures of a Ubiquitous Fellow
- 1938: Ideas in Search of Light
