= Pérák: The Shadow over Prague =

- Directed by: Marek Berger
- Written by: Marek Berger
- Produced by: Dagmar Sedláčková
- Cinematography: Marek Berger
- Music by: Jakub Kudláč
- Production companies: Film and TV School of Academy of Performing Arts, Prague
- Distributed by: Dagmar Sedláčková
- Release date: 2016
- Running time: 13 minutes
- Country: Czech Republic
- Language: Czech

Pérák: The Shadow over Prague (Czech: Pérák: Stín nad Prahou) is a 2016 Czech animated superhero film, which premiered on 20 June 2016. It was inspired by an urban legend about Pérák, the Spring Man of Prague, by Rychlé šípy and the legend of the Golem of Prague. Director Marek Berger has said that he intends to make sequels.

== Plot ==
The film begins with the Gestapo raiding the flat of David Brázda. Brázda resists arrest and eventually escapes by jumping out of a window. Brázda then turns to crime and becomes Pérák.

The Germans plan to revive the Golem of Prague and use him for their purposes. They retrieve the "Hedge in a Cage", an artefact needed to revive Golem. Pérák wants to foil their plan but is distracted when he sees a Jewish woman threatened by group of German soldiers. Pérák kills the soldiers but the woman is revealed to be a German agent and attacks him. They fight while the Germans revive Golem, who starts to destroy everything around. Pérák defeats the agent and drugs her. Pérák then goes to fight Golem. He eventually lures Golem to the Vltava where he switches him off. Pérák then tries to flee but his legs are shot off by the agent. Pérák is captured but the German scientist who helped to revive Golem wants Pérák alive. The film concludes after the war when Pérák is found in a German Bunker. It is revealed that the scientist gave him robotic legs.

== Reception ==
Pérák: The Shadow over Prague won the Opavský Páv award for the best student film of 2016 and for best animated student film of 2016.
