= Daria Kashcheeva =

Tajikistani-born Czech director (born 1986)

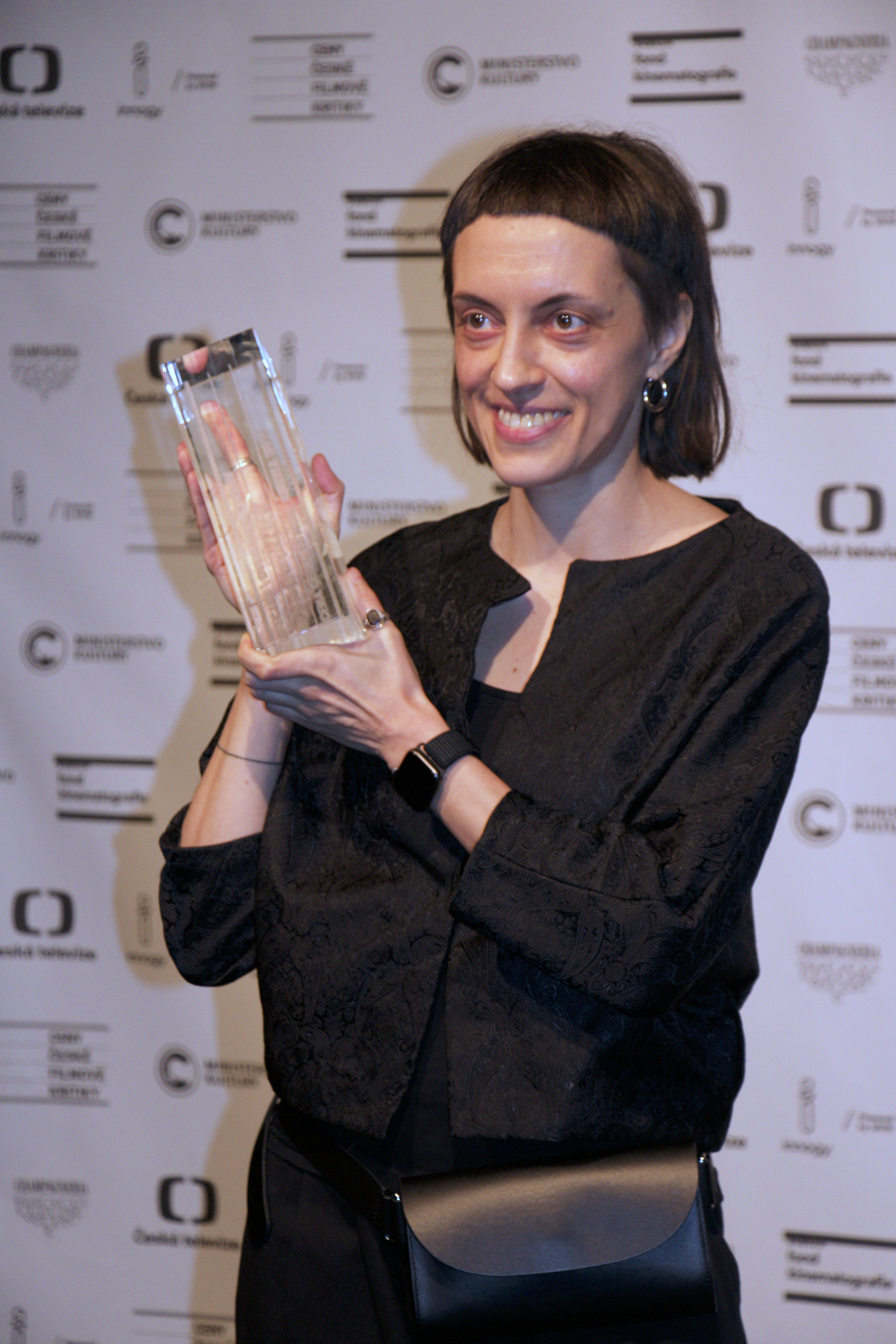
Kashcheeva in February 2024 with the 2023 Czech Film Critics' Award in category "Best short film" for her film Electra

Daria Kascheeva (born 1 April 1986) is a Tajikistani-born Czech animator. She is most noted for her 2019 film Daughter, which was an Academy Award nominee for Best Animated Short Film at the 92nd Academy Awards in 2020.

Kashcheeva's 2023 film Electra premiered at the 2023 Cannes Film Festival. It was later screened at the 2023 Toronto International Film Festival, where it won the award for Best International Short Film.
