= 1969 in animation =

Events in 1969 in animation.

== Events ==
=== March ===
- March 18: Kimio Yabuki's The Wonderful World of Puss 'n Boots premieres, which marks the debut of Pero, who serves as Toei Animation's mascot.

=== April ===
- April 13: Marv Newland's student project Bambi Meets Godzilla is released. It gained a cult status in later years as it garnered fan sequels and remakes.
- April 14: 41st Academy Awards: The Walt Disney Company production Winnie the Pooh and the Blustery Day by Wolfgang Reitherman wins the Academy Award for Best Animated Short.

=== May ===
- May 24: Sugar, Sugar, a song from The Archies, is released as a single and becomes a surprise number one-hit in many countries.

=== June ===
- June 1: The Woody Woodpecker cartoon Tumble Weed Greed by Paul J. Smith is first released.
- June 14: In the Soviet Union, the first episode of "Nu, Pogodi!" (Well, Just You Wait!) has been released. It became the most popular Soviet cartoon series later on.

=== July ===
- July 26: The last Looney Tunes theatrical animated short, Bugged by a Bee by Bob McKimson, is first released.

=== September ===
- September 6: The first episode of The Pink Panther Show is broadcast.
- September 13:
  - The first episodes of Hanna-Barbera's Wacky Races spinoffs The Perils of Penelope Pitstop, and Dastardly and Muttley in Their Flying Machines are broadcast.
  - The first episode of Hanna-Barbera's Scooby-Doo, Where Are You! premieres on CBS. The Scooby-Doo franchise will go on to become a major pop-cultural icon, with numerous spin-offs, direct-to-video films, and two live-action films.
- September 20: The last Merrie Melodies animated short, Injun Trouble, is released before Warner Bros. Cartoons closes down. This particular cartoon was rarely seen after its theatrical release following the controversy regarding the potentially offensive racist content and became the most obscure cartoon by Warner Bros. to date.
- September 27: The Peanuts TV special It Was a Short Summer, Charlie Brown premieres on CBS.

=== October ===
- October 5:
  - The first episode of Moomin, an anime adaptation of Tove Jansson's novel series Moomins is broadcast in Japan.
  - The first episode of Monty Python's Flying Circus is broadcast which features surreal animated intermezzos, created by Terry Gilliam.
  - The first episode of Sazae-San is broadcast. It is the longest-running animated TV series in the world, still being on the air as of 2023.

=== November ===
- November 10: The first episode of Sesame Street is broadcast on television. It is primarily live-action but also has animated segments.
- November 12: Hey, Hey, Hey, It's Fat Albert, an animated special based on the standup routines of Bill Cosby is broadcast on NBC. It would later inspire the animated series Fat Albert and the Cosby Kids.
- November 16: Fyodor Khitruk's Winnie-the-Pooh is first released.

=== December ===
- December 4: Bill Melendez's A Boy Named Charlie Brown is first released, the first animated feature based on Peanuts.
- December 7: The Rankin/Bass Productions Christmas special Frosty the Snowman first airs.
- December 10: The Walt Disney Company releases It's Tough to Be a Bird, directed by Ward Kimball.
- December 13: Belvision releases Tintin and the Temple of the Sun by Eddie Lateste, an animated feature based on The Adventures of Tintin comics.

=== Specific date unknown ===
- David Cherkasskiy releases the animated film Mystery-Bouffe which is banned by the Russian government outside of the Ukrainian SSR.
- In the Soviet Union, the most popular Soviet cartoon, Nu, pogodi! was released with its first episode.
- The first episode of "Porwanie Baltazara Gabki" has been released on Polish Television.
- Whitney Lee Savage's underground animated short Mickey Mouse in Vietnam is released.
- Jan Švankmajer's Don Juan and A Quiet Week in the House are released.
- Valentin Karavaev's Ded Moroz and Summer is released.
- Roman Davydov releases Adventures of Mowgli.

== Films released ==
- January 1 - Treasure Island (South Korea)
- February 2 - Till a City Beneath the Sea is Built (Japan)
- March 18 - The Wonderful World of Puss 'n Boots (Japan)
- June 14 - A Thousand and One Nights (Japan)
- July 20 - Flying Phantom Ship (Japan)
- July 21 - General Hong Gil-dong (South Korea)
- July 26 - Star of the Giants: The Bloody Finals (Japan)
- October 29 - Maruhi Gekiga, Ukiyoe Senichiya (Japan)
- November 20 - A Christmas Carol (Australia and United States)
- December 4 - A Boy Named Charlie Brown (United States)
- December 13 - Tintin and the Temple of the Sun (France)
- December 18 - The Animals' Conference (West Germany)
- December 20 - Star of the Giants: Go Go Hyūma (Japan)
- December 30 - The Nonexistent Knight (Italy)
- Specific date unknown:
  - Mort & Phil's First Festival (Spain)
  - Mystery-Bouffe (Soviet Union)

== Television series debuts ==
- January 6 - Himitsu no Akko-chan debuts on TV Asahi.
- January 13 - Marine Boy debuts on Fuji TV and NTV.
- March 31 - Sobakasu Pucchî debuts on Fuji TV.
- April 1 - Umeboshi Denka debuts in syndication.
- April 2 - Judo Boy debuts on Fuji TV.
- April 4 - Mōretsu Atarō debuts on NET.
- April 6 - Dororo and Kamui the Ninja debut on Fuji TV.
- April 28 - Roppô Yabure Kun debuts on Nagoya TV.
- June 14 - Well, Just You Wait! debuts on Soviet Central Television, Channel 1 Ostankino, and Channel One Russia.
- September 6:
  - Cattanooga Cats, Hot Wheels, Skyhawks, The Hardy Boys, and The Smokey Bear Show debut on ABC.
  - Here Comes The Grump debuts on NBC.
  - The Pink Panther Show debuts on NBC and ABC.
- September 12 - Sabrina, The Teenage Witch debuts on CBS and in syndication.
- September 13 - Dastardly and Muttley in Their Flying Machines, Scooby-Doo, Where Are You!, and The Perils of Penelope Pitstop debut on CBS.
- September 29 - Otoko Ippiki Gaki Daishô and Pinch to Punch debut in syndication.
- October 2 - Tiger Mask debuts on TV Asahi and Yomiuri TV.
- October 5 - Moomin, Sazae-san, and The Genie Family debut on Fuji TV.
- October 6 - Chigley debuts on BBC 1.
- October 7 - Mary, Mungo and Midge debuts on BBC 1.
- October 20 - Zen-chan Tsū-chan debuts in syndication.
- November 10 - Sesame Street debuts on NET (now known as PBS).
- November 16 - Clangers debuts on BBC1.
- December 7 - Attack No. 1 debuts on Fuji TV.
- Specific date unknown:
  - Hattytown Tales debuts on ITV.
  - Happy Merry-Go-Round debuts on Soviet Central Television, Russia-1, and Carousel.
  - Taro, Giant Of The Jungle debuts in syndication.

== Births ==
=== January ===
- January 1: Mr. Lawrence, American animator, writer, producer, director, storyboard artist, designer, layout artist, voice actor and comedian (voice of Filburt Shellbach and Peter Wolfe in Rocko's Modern Life, Sheldon J. Plankton and Larry the Lobster in SpongeBob SquarePants, Edward Platypus, Dave, and Ping-Pong in Camp Lazlo, creator of The Fatheads).
- January 4: Jenn Forgie, Canadian actress and singer (voice of young Kaede and Jakotsu in Inuyasha, continued voice of May Kanker and Nazz in Ed, Edd n Eddy).
- January 5:
  - Marilyn Manson, American singer, songwriter, actor, painter and writer (voiced himself in the Clone High episode "Episode Two: Election Blu-Galoo").
  - Shea Whigham, American actor (voice of George Stacy in Spider-Man: Across the Spider-Verse).
- January 6: Norman Reedus, American actor (voice of Daryl Dixon in the Robot Chicken episode "The Robot Chicken Walking Dead Special: Look Who's Walking", Wild Pete in the Turbo Fast episode "The Good, The Bad, and the Bugly", Rolo in the Voltron: Legendary Defender episode "Taking Flight", Tim in the American Dad! episode "Hayley Smith, Seal Team Six", Striker in the Helluva Boss episode "The Harvest Moon Festival").
- January 14:
  - Jason Bateman, American actor, director and producer (voice of Darkos in Arthur and the Invisibles, Larry Littlejunk in Sit Down, Shut Up, Nick Wilde in the Zootopia franchise and Once Upon a Studio, Dr. Leslie in the King of the Hill episode "The Petriot Act", Tommy Turner in The Fairly OddParents episode "Oh, Brother!", Hermes in the Justice League Unlimited episode "The Balance", Max Davis and himself in The Simpsons episodes "The Road to Cincinnati" and "Home Away from Homer").
  - Kyōko Hikami, Japanese voice actress (voice of Momoko Hanasaki in Wedding Peach, Hikaru Usada/Rabi~en~Rose in Di Gi Charat, Hebi no Yuki in Angel Tales, Tsubaki Takamura in Sakura Wars, Urara Kasuga in Sakura Diaries, Sakagami-sensei in Love Lab, Yuki Sakurakōji in Code:Breaker).
- January 18: Dave Bautista, American actor and former professional wrestler (voice of Parakeet King in The Boy and the Heron, Baka in the Little Demon, episode "Night of the Leeches", Delivery Guy in the TripTank episode "Short Change", Tagah in Avatar Aang: The Last Airbender).
- January 22: Olivia d'Abo, British actress (voice of Jane Porter in The Legend of Tarzan, Melanie Walker / Ten in Batman Beyond, Star Sapphire and Morgaine le Fey in Justice League and Justice League Unlimited, Tak in Invader Zim, Luminara Unduli in Star Wars: The Clone Wars, Black Widow in Ultimate Avengers and Ultimate Avengers 2, Five in Generator Rex, Elasti-Girl in the Batman: The Brave and the Bold episode "The Last Patrol!").
- January 27: Patton Oswalt, American comedian, writer, and actor (voice of Remy in Ratatouille, Quibble Pants in My Little Pony: Friendship Is Magic, Tobey McCallister in WordGirl, Atom in Teen Titans Go!, Professor Dementor in Kim Possible, Space Cabbie in Justice League Action, Uncle Ben and Chameleon in Spider-Man, Max in The Secret Life of Pets 2, the title character in M.O.D.O.K., Thrasher in Robotomy, Specs in Static Shock).
- January 29: Bob Kushell, American television producer and writer (Yo Yogi!, Goof Troop, The Simpsons).

=== February ===
- February 4: Jill Anthony Thomas, American casting director (King of the Hill, Futurama, Olive, the Other Reindeer, The Goode Family).
- February 5: Derek Stephen Prince, American actor (voice of Shino Aburame in Naruto, Ranjiro Kiyama in Beyblade Burst, Uryū Ishida in Bleach, Naoki Konishi in Persona 4: The Animation, Nunchuck Nick in Bobobo-bo Bo-bobo, Lin and Shin in Cowboy Bebop, various characters in the Digimon franchise).
- February 8: Karl Wiedergott, German-born American actor (voice of various characters in The Simpsons).
- February 9: Tom Scharpling, American comedian, television writer (Tom Goes to the Mayor), producer, actor (voice of Greg Universe in the Steven Universe franchise, Jermaine in Adventure Time, Willie Nelson in the Aqua Teen Hunger Force episode "The Shaving", Paul in The Simpsons episode "The Marge-ian Chronicles"), and radio host.
- February 11:
  - Lee Tockar, Canadian actor and visual artist (voice of John Bolton/Ripster in Street Sharks, the title character in Yakkity Yak, Bling-Bling Boy in Johnny Test, Stretch-o-Mutt in Krypto the Superdog, George in George of the Jungle, MODOK in Iron Man: Armored Adventures, Doktor Frogg in League of Super Evil, Snips, Steven Magnet and Spot in My Little Pony: Friendship Is Magic, Inky in Pac-Man and the Ghostly Adventures, Mim-Mim in Kate & Mim-Mim, Theodore "The Roach" Roachmont in Supernoobs).
  - Jennifer Aniston, American actress (voice of Annie Hughes in The Iron Giant, Sarah Gardner in Storks, Galatea in the Hercules episode "Hercules and the Dream Date", Mrs. Stevens in the South Park episode "Rainforest Shmainforest").
- February 14: Rosto, Dutch animator and film director (The Monster of Nix, No Place Like Home, Lonely Bones, Splintertime), (d. 2019).
- February 22: Thomas Jane, American actor (voice of Jonah Hex in DC Showcase: Jonah Hex, Punisher in the Robot Chicken episode "Spike Fraser in: Should I Happen to Back Into a Horse").
- February 26: Christine Auten, American voice actress (voice of Sakaki in Azumanga Daioh, Izumi Curtis in Fullmetal Alchemist, Fuyumi Otori in Ouran High School Host Club, Kuroha Shiratori in Eden of the East).
- February 28: Pat Monahan, American singer and band member of Train (voice of Driver Dan in the US dub of Driver Dan's Story Train).

=== March ===
- March 8: Don Hall, American director, animator and screenwriter (Walt Disney Animation Studios).
- March 10:
  - Paget Brewster, American actress and singer (voice of Della Duck in DuckTales, Birdgirl in Harvey Birdman, Attorney at Law and Birdgirl, Elsie in Dan Vs., Lana Lang in Batman: The Dark Knight Returns, Lois Lane in Justice League: Gods and Monsters and Justice League: Gods and Monsters Chronicles, Poison Ivy in Batman and Harley Quinn, Amber Gold in The Venture Bros., Rona Vipra in Duck Dodgers, Viola in Adventure Time, Paige Sinclair in BoJack Horseman).
  - Joel Kuwahara, American animation producer (Adelaide Productions, The Simpsons, Queer Duck, ¡Mucha Lucha!, co-founder of Bento Box Entertainment).
- March 13: Cynthia True, American television producer and writer (The Fairly OddParents, O'Grady, My Life as a Teenage Robot, Johnny Test, The Replacements, Zip Zip, co-creator of The Mighty B!).
- March 19: Kevin Shinick, American television writer and producer (Mad, Robot Chicken, Spider-Man) and voice actor (voice of various characters in Mad and Robot Chicken, Bruce Banner in Avengers Assemble, Guardians of the Galaxy, and Spider-Man, Dad in the Justice League Action episode "Nuclear Family Values").
- March 20: Elliot M. Bour, American director, animator and story artist.
- March 27:
  - Mariah Carey, American singer and songwriter (voice of Mayor McCaskill in The Lego Batman Movie, Rebecca in The Star, Laura in the American Dad! episode "Kung Pao Turkey", herself in All I Want for Christmas Is You and The Proud Family franchise).
  - Pauley Perrette, American actress (voice of Female Lover Bear in Brother Bear, Lois Lane in Superman vs. The Elite, Delilah Domino/The Crimson Witch in Scooby-Doo! and Kiss: Rock and Roll Mystery, Cop in the Batman Beyond episode "Golem").

=== April ===
- April 1: April Stewart, American voice actress (voice of Wendy Testaburger, Liane Cartman, Sharon Marsh, Carol McCormick, Shelly Marsh, Mayor McDaniels, Principal Victoria and various other characters in South Park, Maria Rivera in El Tigre: The Adventures of Manny Rivera, Marci McFist in Randy Cunningham: 9th Grade Ninja, Granny Goodness, Stompa, and Ms. Moone in DC Super Hero Girls, Blaze's Mom in the Blaze and the Monster Machines episode "The Blaze Family", Silver Sable in the Spider-Man episode "Take Two", Greater Basilisk in The Owl House episode "The First Day").
- April 3: Ben Mendelsohn, Australian actor (voice of Killian in Spies in Disguise, Agent Mace in Infinity Train, Orson Krennic in the Star Wars: The Bad Batch episode "The Summit").
- April 6:
  - Paul Rudd, American actor, screenwriter and producer (portrayed himself in Chip 'n Dale: Rescue Rangers, voice of TV Host, Ang Lee, Sock Puppets and Jasper the Douchebag Ghost in Robot Chicken, Derek Dietl in Monsters vs. Aliens, Dr. Zander and Judd Apatow in The Simpsons, Tom in TripTank, Mr. Prince in The Little Prince, Darren in Sausage Party, John in Nerdland, Jericho in the Bob's Burgers episode "The Horse Rider-er", and The Bob's Burgers Movie, David in Saturday Morning All Star Hits!, himself in The Simpsons episodes "Steal This Episode" and "Three Dreams Denied").
  - Albert Calleros, American animator, background artist (Klasky-Csupo), storyboard artist (The Wild Thornberrys, Futurama, Baby Blues, 3-South, Drawn Together, Star vs. the Forces of Evil, Green Eggs and Ham, Phineas and Ferb the Movie: Candace Against the Universe) and director (American Dad!, The Cleveland Show, Bordertown, Disenchantment, Beavis and Butt-Head Do the Universe).
  - Cindy Robinson, American voice actress (voice of Amy Rose in the Sonic the Hedgehog franchise, Operetta, Jackson Jekyll, and Holt Hyde in the Monster High franchise, Lois Lane in Superman: Red Son, V.V. in Code Geass, Queen Beryl and Berthier in Sailor Moon, Balsa in Moribito: Guardian of the Spirit, Kukaku Shiba and Kiyone Kotetsu in Bleach).
- April 16: Dawn Brancheau, American senior animal trainer (guest starred in the Fetch! with Ruff Ruffman episode "Ruff Pigs Out and Has a Whale of a Time"), (d. 2010).
- April 21: Traci Paige Johnson, American animator and producer (Beavis and Butt-Head, co-creator and voice of Blue in Blue's Clues).
- April 24: Mark Hentemann, American screenwriter, creator and producer (Family Guy).
- April 25: Gina Torres, American actress (voice of Vixen in Justice League Unlimited, Superwoman in Justice League: Crisis on Two Earths, Airachnid in Transformers: Prime, Chatana in Elena of Avalor, Ketsu Onyo in Star Wars Rebels and Star Wars Forces of Destiny, Ebony Brown in The Boondocks episode "Lovely Ebony Brown").
- April 25: Renée Zellweger, American actress (voice of Angie in Shark Tale, Vanessa Bloome in Bee Movie, Katie in Monsters vs. Aliens, Tammy Duvall in the King of the Hill episode "Ho, Yeah!").
- April 28:
  - Blake Neely, American composer, conductor and orchestrator (The Iron Giant, The Simpsons Movie).
  - Eric Trueheart, American television writer (Invader Zim, Super Robot Monkey Team Hyperforce Go!, Yin Yang Yo!, Growing Up Creepie, Bolts & Blip, Pound Puppies, SheZow, Packages from Planet X, Turbo Fast, Sonic Boom, Invader Zim: Enter the Florpus).

=== May ===
- May 1: Wes Anderson, American film director and writer (Fantastic Mr. Fox, Isle of Dogs).
- May 7: Jun Falkenstein, American animation director, writer, and storyboard artist (The Tigger Movie).
- May 11: Eric Fogel, American animator, voice actor, writer, director (Daria, Cartoon Sushi, My Scene Goes Hollywood: The Movie, The Barbie Diaries, Wallykazam!, Descendants: Wicked World, Archibald's Next Big Thing) and producer (creator of The Head, Celebrity Deathmatch and Starveillance, co-creator of Glenn Martin, DDS).
- May 12: Melleny Melody, Canadian actress and singer (voice of Dementia the Carnegie Hall Groupie in Rock & Rule, Cheer Bear and Baby Tugs Bear in Care Bears, Lime Chiffon, Banana Twirl, Bananakin, and Lemon Meringue in Strawberry Shortcake, Lady Urgah Gorneesh in Star Wars: Ewoks, Darva in Star Wars: Droids).
- May 14: Cate Blanchett, Australian actor (voice of Gran Mamare in Ponyo, Valka in the How to Train Your Dragon franchise, Kaa in Mowgli: Legend of the Jungle, Spazzatura in Guillermo del Toro's Pinocchio, Penelope and Elizabeth II in Family Guy, Hela in What If...?, Elain Wolff in The Simpsons episode "The Way of the Dog").
- May 15:
  - Frederik Du Chau, Belgian film director, screenwriter and animator (The Smoggies, TaleSpin, Tom and Jerry: The Movie, The Land Before Time III: The Time of the Great Giving, Quest for Camelot).
  - Kirk DeMicco, American screenwriter, animator, director and producer (DreamWorks Animation, Space Chimps, Vivo).
- May 16: David Boreanaz, American actor (voice of Hal Jordan in Justice League: The New Frontier, Seeley Booth in the American Dad! episode "Less Money, Mo' Problems").
- May 19: Dan Lee, Canadian animator and character designer (Disney Television Animation, Pixar), (d. 2005).
- May 21: Jenny Nissenson, American television writer and script coordinator (ChalkZone, The Fairly OddParents).
- May 25: Anne Heche, American actress (voice of Gloria the Waitress in Higglytown Heroes, Lois Lane in Superman: Doomsday, Cherry Cream Soda in Adventure Time, Suyin Beifong in The Legend of Korra), (d. 2022).
- May 27: Glenn Ficarra, American producer, actor, director and screenwriter (The Wild Thornberrys, The Angry Beavers, Smallfoot).

=== June ===
- June 4:
  - Horatio Sanz, Chilean-born American actor and comedian (voice of Duncan in the Wreck-It Ralph franchise, Dutch Vallejo in Fillmore!, Allistair in Long Live the Royals, El Fuego in Big Hero 6: The Series, Santos Gutierrez in the Elena of Avalor episode "All Kingdoms Fair", Douglas in the Duncanville episode "Sibling Reverly").
  - Rob Huebel, American actor and comedian (voice of Gray Diamond in Axe Cop, Mr. Lizer in Big Mouth, Crash McCaren in the Archer episode "The Archer Sanction").
- June 8: J. P. Manoux, American actor, comedian, director and writer (voice of Kuzco in House of Mouse and The Emperor's New School, Bike Repair Hero in the Higglytown Heroes episode "Wayne's Cycle Recycle", Gus in the Random! Cartoons episode "Bradwurst", Alan Harper in the Family Guy episode "Ocean's Three and a Half", additional voices in My Neighbor Totoro).
- June 11:
  - Cristina Pucelli, American voice actress (voice of Luan Loud in The Loud House, Miss Martian and Catwoman in DC Super Hero Girls, Hazel in Doc McStuffins, Miranda in The Casagrandes).
  - Peter Dinklage, American actor (voice of Captain Gutt in Ice Age: Continental Drift, the Mighty Eagle in The Angry Birds Movie and The Angry Birds Movie 2, Phil Betterman in The Croods: A New Age).
- June 13: Scott Page-Pagter, American actor, television producer, composer, sound effects artist and voice director (Saban Entertainment), (d. 2021).
- June 14:
  - Jay Lender, American television writer, storyboard artist and director (Nickelodeon Animation Studio, Phineas and Ferb).
  - Tim Long, American television writer (The Simpsons) and producer (The Simpsons, China, IL, Napoleon Dynamite).
- June 15: Ice Cube, American rapper, actor and filmmaker (voice of Candle Maker in The Book of Life).
- June 16: Sam Register, American television producer and businessman (Warner Bros. Animation, Cartoon Network Studios, Hanna-Barbera Studios Europe, creator of Hi Hi Puffy AmiYumi).
- June 17: Amy Keating Rogers, American television writer (Cartoon Network Studios, Nickelodeon Animation Studio, My Little Pony: Friendship Is Magic, Care Bears: Welcome to Care-a-Lot, PAW Patrol, Care Bears and Cousins, T.O.T.S., Mira, Royal Detective).
- June 26: Colin Greenwood, English musician, bassist and member of Radiohead (voiced himself in the South Park episode "Scott Tenorman Must Die").
- June 29: Mark Thornton, American animator (Grojband, Looped, Thumbelina, The Pebble and the Penguin, Anastasia, Titan A.E., Joseph: King of Dreams, Beauty and the Beast: The Enchanted Christmas, Stickin' Around, Space Jam, Osmosis Jones, Jacob Two-Two, The Jungle Book 2, 6teen, Clone High, Total Drama, Fangbone!, Arctic Dogs), screenwriter (Grojband, Looped), director (Grojband, Looped, Total Drama, Open Season: Call of Nature) and producer (Grojband), (d. 2025).
- June 30: Jordan Reichek, American animator (The Ren & Stimpy Show, The Simpsons), character designer (Inspector Gadget Saves Christmas, Adventures of Sonic the Hedgehog), storyboard artist (Animaniacs, CatDog, Monsters vs. Aliens, Megamind, Legends of Oz: Dorothy's Return), writer, producer and director (The Baby Huey Show, Invader Zim, The Groovenians).

=== July ===
- July 2: Micah Wright, American screenwriter (The Angry Beavers, Ozzy & Drix, creator of Constant Payne).
- July 7: Cree Summer, American-Canadian actress and singer (voice of Kim, Christy and Gay in Care Bears, Kneesaa a Jari Kintaka in Ewoks, Catnip in Hello Kitty's Furry Tale Theater, Kida in Atlantis: The Lost Empire and Atlantis: Milo's Return, Penny in Inspector Gadget, Elmyra Duff in Animaniacs, Tiny Toon Adventures, and Pinky, Elmyra & the Brain, Susie Carmichael in Rugrats, Cleo in Clifford the Big Red Dog, Miranda in As Told By Ginger, Max Gibson in Batman Beyond, Numbuh 5, Cree, and the Delightful Children from Down the Lane in Codename: Kids Next Door).
- July 8: Rachael Lillis, American voice actress and screenwriter (voice of Misty, Jessie, and Jigglypuff in seasons 1-8 of Pokémon, Utena Tenjo in Revolutionary Girl Utena, Mito Freecss in Hunter × Hunter, Martina in Slayers Next, Major Yuriko Star in The Irresponsible Captain Tylor, Headmistress Faragonda in the 4Kids dub of Winx Club, Charlotte in Berserk, Hela Nemo in Cubix, Danny in Sonic X, Ohno in Genshiken, Lonae in Teenage Mutant Ninja Turtles, Micott Barscht in Mobile Suit Gundam Unicorn), (d. 2024).
- July 9: Chris Kratt, American biologist and television producer (created and voiced himself in Wild Kratts).
- July 13: Ken Jeong, American actor and comedian (voice of Sprout Cloverleaf in My Little Pony: A New Generation, Dynomutt in Scoob!, Toyman in Justice League Action, Mr. Chang in The Loud House and The Casagrandes, Bobby in KPop Demon Hunters).
- July 19: Ash Brannon, American animator, designer, storyboard artist, writer, and director (Walt Disney Animation Studios, Pixar, Sony Pictures Animation).
- July 21: Godfrey, American comedian and actor (voice of Mr. Stubborn and Mr. Tall in The Mr. Men Show, Kofi Pizza in Steven Universe, Barack Obama in Our Cartoon President, Ka Boluu in the My Dad the Bounty Hunter episode "This Is Doloraam", Al Sharpton in the Black Dynamite episode "Roots: The White Album").
- July 22: James Arnold Taylor, American voice actor, writer, producer, and podcast host (voice of Milo Thatch in Atlantis: Milo's Return, Obi-Wan Kenobi in the Star Wars franchise, Wooldoor Sockbat, Jew Producer and other various characters in Drawn Together, the title character in Johnny Test, Harry Osborn in The Spectacular Spider-Man, Green Arrow and Green Lantern in Batman: The Brave and the Bold, the Leader in Ultimate Spider-Man, Avengers Assemble and Hulk and the Agents of S.M.A.S.H., Yondu in Guardians of the Galaxy, Ratchet in Ratchet & Clank, continued voice of Fred Flintstone).
- July 23: Bill Chott, American actor and comedian (voice of Hundley and the Doorman in season 1 of Curious George, Ciaccio 'El Gordo', Calvacanti, Stalin and Ulysses' Crew in Dante's Inferno, Lukum in The Snow Queen 2, Agent Messie and FBI Operator in the Invader Zim episode "Zim Eats Waffles", additional voices in Klaus).
- July 24:
  - Jennifer Lopez, American actress and singer (voice of Shira in Ice Age: Continental Drift, Azteca in Antz, Lucy Tucci in Home).
  - Rick Fox, Canadian-Bahamian actor and former basketball player (voice of Flash Williams and Smooth Daley in The Fairly OddParents episode "Odd Ball", himself in the Max Steel episode "Rough Seas").
- July 27: Paul Levesque, American pro wrestler (voiced himself in Scooby-Doo! WrestleMania Mystery, Scooby-Doo! and WWE: Curse of the Speed Demon, Surf's Up 2: WaveMania).
- July 28: Todd Frederiksen, American animator (2 Stupid Dogs, Thumbelina, The Pagemaster, Dexter's Laboratory, Samurai Jack), background artist (Cartoon Network Studios, Oh Yeah! Cartoons, ChalkZone, American Dad!, My Life as a Teenage Robot), prop designer (Sym-Bionic Titan, Disney Television Animation), storyboard artist (Timon & Pumbaa, Dumb and Dumber, Big Guy and Rusty the Boy Robot), art director (2 Stupid Dogs, Nightmare Ned) and director (2 Stupid Dogs, Dilbert, Sammy).
- July 29: David Carling, British voice actor (voice of Station Officer Steele, Mike Flood, Tom Thomas and Trevor Evans in Fireman Sam, Rainbow and Bread Man in Sarah & Duck, provided additional voices for Snow White: The Sequel), (d. 2024).
- July 31:
  - Scott Cleverdon, Scottish actor (voice of Carnage in Spider-Man, Thomas Blake in The New Batman Adventures episode "Cult of the Cat", Jack in the Batman Beyond episode "Dead Man's Hand").
  - Larry Whitaker, American animator, director, screenwriter, designer, and voice actor (Walt Disney Company, Warner Bros. Animation).

=== August ===
- August 5: Kim Mai Guest, American voice actress (voice of Lady Subaru in .hack//SIGN, Nina Einstein and Sayoko Shinozaki in Code Geass, Silver Banshee, Linda Park, and Jennifer Morgan in Justice League Unlimited, Devon in Holly Hobbie & Friends, Jinx in G.I. Joe: Renegades, Katana in the Batman: The Brave and the Bold episode "Inside the Outsiders!", Katma Tui in the Justice League episode "Hearts and Minds").
- August 6:
  - Chris Edgerly, American voice actor, comedian and singer (voice of Peter Potamus, Captain Caveman, Yakky Doodle and the Funky Phantom in Harvey Birdman, Attorney at Law, Agent Haskett in Wolverine and the X-Men, Manny Piffle in Clarence, additional voices in Drawn Together and The Simpsons).
  - Jonathan Aibel, American screenwriter and producer (DreamWorks Animation, King of the Hill, Alvin and the Chipmunks: The Squeakquel, Alvin and the Chipmunks: Chipwrecked, The SpongeBob Movie: Sponge Out of Water, The SpongeBob Movie: Sponge on the Run, Luck).
  - Naomi Ishida, Japanese color designer (The Melancholy of Haruhi Suzumiya, A Silent Voice) and member of Kyoto Animation, (d. 2019) in the Kyoto Animation arson attack.
- August 10: Brian Drummond, Canadian actor (voice of Vegeta in the Ocean dub of Dragon Ball Z, Ryuk in Death Note, Zechs Merquise in Gundam Wing, Ahuizotl, Double Diamond, Filthy Rich, Mr. Cake, Seabreeze, and Sheriff Silverstar in My Little Pony: Friendship Is Magic).
- August 11:
  - Ashley Jensen, Scottish actress (voice of Phlegma the Fierce in the How to Train Your Dragon franchise, The Surprisingly Curvaceous Pirate in The Pirates! In an Adventure With Scientists!, Nanette in Sherlock Gnomes, Downy McDuck in DuckTales).
  - Julie Benenati, American animation checker (Cartoon Network Studios), (d. 2021).
- August 12: Doug Langdale, American television writer (Disney Television Animation, Nickelodeon, Earthworm Jim, Cleopatra in Space, The Adventures of Puss in Boots, The Looney Tunes Show) and producer (creator of Dave the Barbarian and The Weekenders, co-creator of Project G.e.e.K.e.R.).
- August 14: Meghan Strange, American actress and singer (voice of Paw Pilot in Special Agent Oso, Robin in Sofia the First, Ruby in The Land Before Time franchise, Harley Quinn in the Batman: The Brave and the Bold episode "Emperor Joker!").
- August 16: Kate Higgins, American actress (voice of Sakura Haruno in Naruto, Talho Yuki in Eureka Seven, Karin Kurosaki, Nanao Ise, Retsu Unohana, and Lilynette Gingerbuck in Bleach, C.C. in Code Geass, Chloe / Glitter Breeze in Glitter Force, Ami Mizuno / Sailor Mercury in Sailor Moon, Angel in Stitch!, Scarlet Witch in Wolverine and the X-Men, Mayor Nettles in Scooby-Doo! Mystery Incorporated, continued voice of Aurora).
- August 17: Kelvin Mercer, American musician and member of De La Soul (voiced himself in the Teen Titans Go! episode "Don't Press Play").
- August 18:
  - Christian Slater, American actor and producer (voice of Pip in FernGully: The Last Rainforest, Rand Ridley in Inside Job, Doctor Schadenfreude's Igor in Igor, Jack in Back to the Sea, Leeyoon in Mune: Guardian of the Moon, Deadshot in Suicide Squad: Hell to Pay and Justice League Action, Jet Fusion in The Adventures of Jimmy Neutron, Boy Genius, Slater in Archer, the Grim Buccaneer in Jake and the Never Land Pirates, Ushari in The Lion Guard, Elliot Decker in Milo Murphy's Law, Ren in Lego Star Wars: Terrifying Tales, Paul the Delivery Guy in the Phineas and Ferb episode "Delivery of Destiny", Johnny Slade in the Out There episode "Springoween", Gurg in the Dawn of the Croods episode "Grug vs. Gurg", Vance Maximus in the Rick and Morty episode "Vindicators 3: The Return of Worldender", himself in the Scooby-Doo and Guess Who? episode "The High School Wolfman's Musical Lament!").
  - Edward Norton, American actor and filmmaker (voice of Sammy Bagel Jr. in Sausage Party, Rex in Isle of Dogs, Devon Bradley in The Simpsons episode "The Great Money Caper").
- August 19:
  - Matthew Perry, American-Canadian actor, comedian and producer (voiced himself in The Simpsons episode "Treehouse of Horror XII"), (d. 2023).
  - Paula Jai Parker, American actress (voice of Trudy Proud in The Proud Family franchise).
- August 20: Ken Bruce, American animator (The Simpsons, Box-Office Bunny, FernGully: The Last Rainforest), sheet timer (Duckman, 3-South, Nickelodeon Animation Studio, Cartoon Network Studios, Family Guy) and director (Nickelodeon).
- August 24:
  - Pierfrancesco Favino, Italian actor and voice actor.
  - Kexx Singleton, American animator (Tiny Toon Adventures, Timon & Pumbaa, The Tigger Movie), storyboard artist (The Super Mario Bros. Super Show!, Timon & Pumbaa, Warner Bros. Animation, Hoops & Yoyo Ruin Christmas, The Awesomes, The 7D, Big Nate), character designer (Warner Bros. Animation, Disney Television Animation, Balto II: Wolf Quest, Mike Young Productions, Balto III: Wings of Change, Stuart Little 3: Call of the Wild, Slacker Cats), modeler (Pixar), art director (Catscratch, Pink Panther and Pals), production designer (Pink Panther and Pals) and director (Dorothy and the Wizard of Oz, Scooby-Doo and Guess Who?).
- August 26: Glenn Berger, American screenwriter and producer (DreamWorks Animation, King of the Hill, Alvin and the Chipmunks: The Squeakquel, Alvin and the Chipmunks: Chipwrecked, The SpongeBob Movie: Sponge Out of Water, The SpongeBob Movie: Sponge on the Run, Luck).
- August 28:
  - Jack Black, American actor, comedian, musician and songwriter (voice of Po in the Kung Fu Panda franchise, Lenny in Shark Tale, Bowser in The Super Mario Bros. Movie, Brad Gunter in Big Nate, Slappy and the Invisible Boy in Goosebumps, Zeke in Ice Age, The Pusher/Larry Hardcore in the Clone High episode "Raisin the Stakes: A Rock Opera in Three Acts", Milo in The Simpsons episode "Husbands and Knives").
  - Jason Priestley, Canadian actor (voice of Bo Diddly Squat in Eek! The Cat, Jack McCyber in Biker Mice from Mars, Chameleon Boy in the Superman: The Animated Series episode "New Kids in Town").
- August 29: Jennifer Crittenden, American television writer and producer (The Simpsons, co-creator of HouseBroken).
- August 30: Kent Osborne, American screenwriter, actor, producer, director, and storyboard artist (Cartoon Network, Nickelodeon, Phineas and Ferb).

=== September ===
- September 3: Noah Baumbach, American film director, screenwriter, and producer (Fantastic Mr. Fox, Madagascar 3: Europe's Most Wanted).
- September 5: Dweezil Zappa, American rock guitarist and actor (voice of Ajax Duckman in Duckman).
- September 13: Tyler Perry, American actor and filmmaker (voice of Cyrus in The Star, Truck Driver in PAW Patrol: The Movie).
- September 21: Billy Porter, American actor (voice of Randall Leibowitz-Jenkins in The Proud Family: Louder and Prouder, Hiroki Hassan in Fairfax, Desmond in The Simpsons episode "Highway to Well", Recycle King in the Middlemost Post episode "BURT! The Musical").
- September 25: Hal Sparks, American actor (voice of Tak in Tak and the Power of Juju).
- September 30:
  - Amy Landecker, American actress (voice of Ugga in The Croods: Family Tree, Barbara Gordon in Batman: The Long Halloween, Dr. Emilia in Kipo and the Age of Wonderbeasts, Barbara Lake in Trollhunters: Tales of Arcadia, Octavia in the She-Ra and the Princesses of Power episode "Boys' Night Out", Gail in the We Baby Bears episode "Tooth Fairy Tech").
  - Mark "Rhino" Smith, British actor and bodybuilder (voice of Officer McHorn in the Zootopia franchise).

=== October ===
- October 1: Zach Galifianakis, American actor and comedian (voice of Joker in The Lego Batman Movie, Humpty Dumpty in Puss in Boots, the title character in Missing Link, Ron in Ron's Gone Wrong, Felix Fischoeder in Bob's Burgers, Gratitoad in Big Mouth, Lucas Bortner in The Simpsons episode "Luca$").
- October 2: Stephanie Gillis, American television writer (The Simpsons).
- October 3: Gwen Stefani, American singer, actress, and television host (voice of DJ Suki in Trolls, herself in the King of the Hill episode "Kidney Boy and Hamster Girl: A Love Story").
- October 4: Abraham Benrubi, American actor (voice of various characters in Robot Chicken, Serge in The Rugrats Movie, General in Big Hero 6, Lonnie Redshirt in Strange World).
- October 10:
  - Loren Bouchard, American animator, writer, producer, director, and composer (Bob's Burgers, Lucy, The Daughter of the Devil, Central Park, Home Movies, The Great North).
  - Wendi McLendon-Covey, American actress (voice of Monica Rappaccini in M.O.D.O.K., Nancy Green in Big City Greens, Patricia in The Looney Tunes Show, Mudflap in Bob's Burgers).
- October 13: Artt Butler, American voice actor (voice of Shang Tsung in Mortal Kombat Legends: Scorpion's Revenge and Mortal Kombat Legends: Battle of the Realms, Captain Ackbar in Star Wars: The Clone Wars, Rafael Diaz in Star vs. the Forces of Evil).
- October 18: Ted Lewis, American voice actor (voice of King Dedede and Escargoon in Kirby: Right Back at Ya!, Giovanni and Tracy Sketchit in Pokémon, Ryo Bakura and Bandit Keith in Yu-Gi-Oh! Duel Monsters, Zangulus in Slayers).
- October 19:
  - Meg LeFauve, American screenwriter and producer (Pixar).
  - Trey Parker, American animator, film director, actor, comedian, and television producer (voice of Balthazar Bratt in Despicable Me 3, co-creator and voice of Stan Marsh, Eric Cartman, and Mr. Garrison in South Park).
  - Vanessa Marshall, American actress (voice of Black Widow in The Avengers: Earth's Mightiest Heroes, Mary Jane Watson in The Spectacular Spider-Man, Black Canary in Young Justice, Poison Ivy in Batman: The Brave and the Bold, Gamora in Guardians of the Galaxy, Myaxx and Tini in Ben 10, Wonder Woman and Giganta in Harley Quinn, Queen Bee in Ben 10, Irwin in The Grim Adventures of Billy & Mandy, Hera Syndulla in the Star Wars franchise, Drew Saturday in the Ben 10: Omniverse episode "T.G.I.S.").
- October 25:
  - Nika Futterman, American actress (voice of Asajj Ventress in the Star Wars franchise, Luna Loud in The Loud House, Adam Lyon in My Gym Partner's a Monkey, Sticks in Sonic Boom, Gamora in Ultimate Spider-Man, Hulk and the Agents of S.M.A.S.H., and Avengers Assemble, Chum Chum in Fanboy & Chum Chum, Catwoman in Batman: The Brave and the Bold).
  - Samantha Bee, Canadian-American comedian, television host, and actress (voice of Mom in Creative Galaxy, Lyla Lolliberry in Phineas and Ferb, herself in the BoJack Horseman episode "The Horny Unicorn").
- October 31:
  - Ash Brannon, American writer, director, visual artist, animator, and producer (Walt Disney Animation Studios, Pixar, Surf's Up, Arcane).
  - David Coburn, American actor (voice of Captain Planet in Captain Planet and the Planeteers and the OK K.O.! Let's Be Heroes episode "The Power is Yours!", Galen in the Oh Yeah! Cartoons episode "Enchanted Adventures", Lee Jordan in the Where on Earth Is Carmen Sandiego? episode "Boyhood's End").

=== November ===
- November 3: Jimmy Keegan, American drummer and voice actor (voice of Henry Bigg in The Littles, additional voices in G.I. Joe: A Real American Hero).
- November 4: Matthew McConaughey, American actor (voice of Buster Moon in Sing and Sing 2, Beetle in Kubo and the Two Strings, Elvis Presley in Agent Elvis).
- November 10: Jennifer Cody, American actress and dancer (voice of Charlotte La Bouff in The Princess and the Frog, Darcy in Winx Club, Lucy in Robot and Monster, Maggie in Mickey and the Roadster Racers, Fifi in Khumba).
- November 12: Rob Schrab, American comic book creator, screenwriter, director, and producer (Rick and Morty, Monster House).
- November 13: Gerard Butler, Scottish actor (voice of Stoick in the How to Train Your Dragon franchise).
- November 17: Renaud Mader, French comic book artist and animator (Gaumont, Walt Disney Animation Studios), (d. 1993).
- November 18:
  - Daphne Rubin-Vega, Panamanian actress and singer (voice of Carmilla Carmine in Hazbin Hotel, Michelle Ipanima in Hey Joel, Little Juanita in the Happily Ever After: Fairy Tales for Every Child episode "Robinita Hood").
  - Duncan Sheik, American composer (Little Spirit: Christmas in New York), (d. 2026).
- November 19: Erika Alexander, American actress (second voice of Agent Rush in The Zeta Project).
- November 21: Ken Griffey Jr., American former professional baseball outfielder (voiced himself in The Simpsons episode "Homer at the Bat").
- November 22: Marjane Satrapi, French-Iranian director (Persepolis) and actress (voice of Schloss in Persepolis, herself in The Simpsons episode "Springfield Splendor"), (d. 2026).
- November 26:
  - Janyse Jaud, Canadian actress, musician and author (voice of Pinkie Pie in My Little Pony, Sarah and Lee Kanker in Ed, Edd n Eddy, Melissa in Baby Looney Tunes, Kagura and Kanna in Inuyasha, Mocchi in Monster Rancher).
  - Otis Van Osten, American sound editor (Disney Television Animation, Warner Bros. Animation, Cartoon Network Studios, DreamWorks Animation Television, Wild Canary Animation, Biker Mice from Mars, The Itsy Bitsy Spider, Hellboy Animated, G.I. Joe: Resolute, Hoops & Yoyo Ruin Christmas, Bob's Burgers, Teenage Mutant Ninja Turtles, Goldie & Bear, Buddy Thunderstruck, SuperMansion, Gen:Lock).
- November 28: Colman Domingo, American actor (voice of Mr. Gillman in Ruby Gillman, Teenage Kraken, Eddie the Dragonfly in the BoJack Horseman episode "The Old Sugarman Place", Stiles in the American Dad! episode "(You Gotta) Strike for Your Right", Norman Osborn in Your Friendly Neighborhood Spider-Man).

=== December ===
- December 4: J. Stewart Burns, American television writer and producer (The Simpsons, Futurama).
- December 5: Catherine Tate, English actress, comedian, and writer (voice of Magica de Spell in DuckTales, Hecate in The Adventures of Puss in Boots).
- December 6: Irene Grandi, Italian singer-songwriter and actress.
- December 13: Hideo Ishikawa, Japanese voice actor and narrator (voice of Itachi Uchiha in Naruto, Jūshirō Ukitake in Bleach, Kiccho Fukuda in Slam Dunk).
- December 17: Laurie Holden, American actress (voice of Dakota in Arctic Dogs, Pauline in Fireheart).
- December 27: Sarah Vowell, American author and journalist (voice of Violet Parr in The Incredibles franchise).

=== Specific date unknown ===
- Mike Schank, American actor and musician (voiced himself in the Family Guy episode "Brian Sings and Swings"), (d. 2022).
- Rino Romano, Canadian actor (voice of Batman in The Batman, Spider-Man in Spider-Man Unlimited, Tuxedo Mask in Sailor Moon, Eduardo Rivera in Extreme Ghostbusters, Randy Hernandez in Godzilla: The Series, the Narrator in Curious George, Uncle Tony in The Super Mario Bros. Movie).
- Laurence O'Keefe, American composer and lyricist (wrote and composed the song "Goodbye, Middle Class" in The Simpsons episode "Poorhouse Rock").
- J. Torres, Filipino-born Canadian comic book and television writer (Hi Hi Puffy AmiYumi, Edgar & Ellen, League of Super Evil, Oh No! It's An Alien Invasion).
- Michelle Belly Dilworth, American television writer and sister of John R. Dilworth (Courage the Cowardly Dog).
- Darrick Bachman, American television writer (Cartoon Network Studios).
- Kyle Hebert, American voice actor (voice of teen/adult Gohan and the narrator in the Dragon Ball franchise, Kiba Inuzuka in Naruto, Sosuke Aizen and Ganju Shiba in Bleach, Kamina in Gurren Lagann).
- Robert Valley, Canadian animator and visual graphic artist (Tron: Uprising, Pear Cider and Cigarettes, Love, Death & Robots).

== Deaths ==
=== February ===
- February 2: Boris Karloff, British actor (narrator and voice of the title character in How the Grinch Stole Christmas, Baron Boris von Frankenstein in Mad Monster Party?), dies at age 81.
- February 3: Al Taliaferro, American comics artist and animator (Walt Disney Animation Studios, Donald Duck comic strip), dies at age 63.
- February 14: Charles Judels, Dutch-American actor (voice of Stromboli and The Coachman in Pinocchio, Chicken Farmer in Porky's Garden), dies at age 86.
- February 19: Madge Blake, American actress (model for Fauna in Sleeping Beauty), dies at age 69.

=== March ===
- March 3: Norman Whitten, English silent film producer, director, and actor (founder of the General Film Supply company (GFS), credited for creating Ireland's first animated film), dies at age 87.

=== June ===
- June 1: Frank Braxton, American animator (Warner Bros. Cartoons, Jay Ward, UPA, Peanuts), dies at age 40 from cancer.
- June 22: Judy Garland, American actress and singer (voice of Mewsette in Gay Purr-ee), dies from a barbiturate overdose at age 47.

=== July ===
- July 4: Ted Eshbaugh, American animator and film director (Goofy Goat Antics, The Wizard of Oz, The Sunshine Makers), dies at age 63.
- July 21: Pete Burness, American animator and animation director (Romer Grey, Van Beuren Studios, Warner Bros. Cartoons, MGM, UPA, Jay Ward Productions), dies from cancer at age 65.

=== September ===
- September 8: Bud Collyer, American actor (voice of the title character in Superman), dies at age 61.
- September 19: Rex Ingram, American actor (narrator in John Henry and the Inky-Poo), dies at age 73.

=== December ===
- December 10: Leigh Harline, American songwriter and composer (The Goddess of Spring, Snow White and the Seven Dwarfs, Pinocchio, Mr. Bug Goes to Town), dies at age 62 from throat cancer.
- December 13: Luigi Pavese, Italian voice actor (provided the Italian voices of Colonel Hathi in The Jungle Book, Boris in Lady and the Tramp, and a Labrador Retriever in One Hundred and One Dalmatians), dies at age 72.
- December 19: Sara Berner, American actress (original voice of Andy Panda, Chilly Willy, Red in Tex Avery's Red Hot Riding Hood and Swing Shift Cinderella, the canary in King-Size Canary and the mother of WB's Beaky Buzzard, Nancy in the Tom & Jerry cartoon Baby Puss, Toots in Tom and Jerry, The Zoot Cat and The Mouse Comes to Dinner, Jerry in Anchors Aweigh, did celebrity voice impressions in several Disney and Warner Bros. Cartoons), dies at age 57.
- December 30: Jiří Trnka, Czech puppeteer, illustrator, animator and film director (The Czech Year, The Emperor's Nightingale, Prince Bayaya, Old Czech Legends, The Good Soldier Schweik, A Midsummer Night's Dream, The Cybernetic Grandma), dies at age 57.

== See also ==
- 1969 in anime
