= Nuclear Family =

A nuclear family is a family group consisting of two parents and their children.

Nuclear Family may also refer to:

- "Nuclear Family" (Bugs), a 1997 television episode
- "Nuclear Family" (Quantum Leap), a 1991 television episode
- Nuclear Family (comics), a group of supervillains in DC Comics
- "Nuclear Family" (song), by American punk rock band Green Day from their 2012 album ¡Uno!
- Nuclear Family (TV series), 2021 American documentary series by Ry Russo-Young
