= You Don't Have to Live Like a Referee =

- The Simpsons episode
- Homer must decide whether to take a bribe and award a penalty kick to Brazil in the World Cup Final, after a dive by Brazil's "El Divo"
- Episode no.: Season 25; Episode 16
- Directed by: Mark Kirkland
- Written by: Michael Price
- Production code: SABF11
- Original air date: March 30, 2014

Guest appearances
- Andrés Cantor as himself; Joey Vieira as a soccer player

Episode features
- Couch gag: The Simpsons are running through the streets of Pamplona, Spain as several couch bulls chase after them. Once the Simpsons reach the couch, a bull slams Homer and takes his spot on the couch. Georges Bizet's Carmen is played throughout the segment.

Episode chronology
← Previous "The War of Art"	Next → "Luca$"
- The Simpsons season 25

"You Don't Have to Live Like a Referee" is the sixteenth episode of the twenty-fifth season of the American animated television series The Simpsons and the 546th episode of the series. It originally aired on the Fox network in the United States on March 30, 2014. It was written by Michael Price and directed by Mark Kirkland. The title is based on the refrain "don't have to live like a refugee" from the 1980 song "Refugee" by Tom Petty and the Heartbreakers.

In this episode, Homer is hired as a referee for the World Cup of association football (soccer) after a viral speech by Lisa praising him. Argentine soccer broadcaster Andrés Cantor guest-stars as himself. The episode received mixed reviews.

== Plot ==
At a school assembly, Principal Skinner presents a skit about history, which goes horribly wrong as the kids immediately heckle it and the assembly devolves into anarchy. Chalmers suggests holding a speech contest on the students' heroes.

Lisa writes a speech on Marie Curie, but finds out on the day of the contest that Martin did the same. At Bart's suggestion, Lisa hastily composes a new speech on Homer, in which, among other things, she recounts when he ejected her from a soccer game for misbehavior. A video of Lisa's speech goes viral online, and the World Cup in Brazil hires Homer as a referee.

At the Cup, Homer proves to be an extremely honest referee: he has no bias for any team due to not caring about the sport, and he refuses the frequent bribery attempts from players and gangsters. Homer admits to Bart that it is hard to turn down the bribes, but knowing that he is Lisa's hero, he wants to retain her respect. Bart decides to tell him the truth; that he was not Lisa's first choice as a hero. Homer is so devastated that he accepts some gangsters' bribe to rig the tournament in favor of Brazil.

Just before the World Cup Final (Brazil vs. Germany), Lisa discovers that Homer took the bribe. Homer scolds Lisa for lying about admiring him, but she replies that his integrity has impressed her so much that he is now her real hero. Homer decides to return to honest refereeing. During the game, a Brazilian player known as "El Divo" (a parody of Neymar) goes down and appears to be hurt. Homer, listening to Lisa, thinks he is merely diving. Homer refuses to award Brazil a penalty kick, and Germany goes on to win.

The betrayed gangsters ambush the Simpson family and are just about to kill Homer when Marge begs them in fluent Portuguese (which she had been attempting to learn throughout the episode) to forgive him. The lead gangster's mother happens to be a lady that Lisa traded plane seats with because the mother's seat-mounted TV was broken. She intercedes to allow the Simpsons to go free.

The Simpsons go on a tour of the Amazon River, with most of the family admiring the nature, while Homer admires the clearing of a section of rainforest to make way for a Krusty Burger.

== Reception ==
Dennis Perkins of The A.V. Club gave the episode a C, saying "there was a lot of potential comic ammo to go around. For one, it's the Simpsons' first trip back to Brazil since the infamous season 13 episode 'Blame It on Lisa' which angered the Brazilian tourist board so badly that there was a lawsuit in the works. Throw in some of the old reliable Homer/Lisa relationship dynamic (ever the most dramatically evocative on the show), and all the pieces were there to assemble a memorable episode. That what eventually emerged was one of the most perfunctory of the season is genuinely a bummer."

Teresa Lopez of TV Fanatic gave the episode three out of five stars, saying "Aside from a touching story, the episode featured some hilarious scenes and sight gags. For one, Kearney placing an 'admire me' note on Homer's back (instead of the usual 'kick me' sign) during Lisa's speech was nice touch. But that one paled in comparison to the montage of creative bribe offers in Brazil. It was an amusing way to make fun of the rampant corruption found in World Cup competitions."

The episode received a 1.9 rating and was watched by a total of 3.91 million people, making it the second most watched show on Animation Domination that night.

The episode gained renewed attention after Germany won the real-life 2014 World Cup and defeated Brazil along the way, though it occurred in a semi-final rather than the final, and by a score of 7 goals to 1 rather than 2 to 0.

In May 2015, after a corruption scandal at FIFA, the world governing body of soccer, the episode received attention over social media, a phenomenon reported on by media such as the BBC.
