= Jason J. Lewis =

American actor

- Occupation: Actor
- Years active: 1997–present

Jason J. Lewis is an American actor, best known for voicing Superman and other DC Comics characters in the Cartoon Network series Justice League Action. He was born in Torrance, California.

== Filmography ==
=== Film ===
Year	Title	Role	Notes
2008	An American Standard	Nate	Short film
2013	Planet Movietone	Dr. Zaius	Voice, short film
2014	Run Like Hell	Mark	
2017	Sightings	Deputy Brian LeMoine	
2017	Super Hero Shrink	Invisible Man	Voice
2022	Green Lantern: Beware My Power	Ganthet, Captain Kantus	Voice, direct-to-video

=== Television ===
Year	Title	Role	Notes
2007	Banja	Germaine	2 episodes
2010	First Edition	Santi	Recurring role
2011	Ask Grim	Sigmund Freud	1 episode
2011	The 1570	Aaron	2 episodes
2014	Jack's Jacuze	Jack	Miniseries
2015	Impress Me	Jason	2 episodes
2015–2016	Swamp Talk with Shrek and Donkey	Donkey	Voice, main role
2016–2018	Justice League Action	Superman, General Zod, DeSaad, Carmine Falcone, Rath, Biff, Quex-Ul, Red Tornado, Dex-Starr, Boss Kack, Chancellor Al-On	Voice, main role
2017	The Perfect Pitch	Alexi	Episode: "Micro-soft"

=== Video games ===
Year	Title	Role
2003	Lineage 2: The Chaotic Chronicle	Human Fighter
2006	Saints Row	Stilwater's Resident
2006	The Sopranos: Road to Respect	Additional voices
2007	Cabela's Big Game Hunter 2008	Dubby
2008	Space Chimps	Ham III
2010	Mafia II	Frankie Pots (uncredited)
2012	Blade & Soul	Male Warrior
2015	Disney Infinity 3.0	Fear
2015	Halo 5: Guardians	Additional voices
