= Jonas Glim =

Publication information
- Publisher: DC Comics
- First appearance: Lobo #1 (December 1993)
- Created by: Alan Grant; Val Semeiks

In-story information
- Partnerships: Lobo
- Abilities: Superhuman strength; Space survivability

Jonas Glim is a fictional character in DC Comics. He first appeared in Lobo #1 (December 1993), and was created by writer Alan Grant and artist Val Semeiks.

== Fictional character biography ==
Jonas Glim is an alien who was born on Manson's World. His father Jeremiah Glim was alcoholic and abused him, intending for Jonas to become a bounty hunter. Jeremiah gives Jonas the Krupps 101, a weapon noted for its wide variety in firepower. Soon after, Jonas kills his father and becomes a bounty hunter.

Jonas meets and becomes friends with Lobo, as they work for the same agency. Together, they torment and beat the hero Goldstar. At one point, the two take advantage of Goldstar's mental illness and enslave him. Around this time, Jonas loses most of his left tusk.

At some point, Jonas Glim assists when Lobo finds a pleasing lead. It concerns a gang leader, the only man who has ever beaten Lobo in a fight. The criminal had hidden from Lobo in the timestream using a time-traveling bike. Lobo jumps through the timestream to alter the fight so he wins, which unintentionally and temporarily transforms Jonas into a frog-like creature.

== Powers and abilities ==
Jonas Glim possesses superhuman strength and can survive in the vacuum of space. He is an expert at hand-to-hand combat and the use of firearms, favoring the Krupps 101 energy gun.

== In other media ==
- Jonas Glim appears in the Justice League Action episode "Follow That Space Cab!", voiced by Troy Baker.
- Jonas Glim makes a minor appearance in the novel DC Universe: Last Sons.
