= Days of Future Future =

- The Simpsons episode
- Episode no.: Season 25; Episode 18
- Directed by: Bob Anderson
- Written by: J. Stewart Burns
- Production code: SABF13
- Original air date: April 13, 2014

Guest appearance
- Amy Poehler as Jenda

Episode features
- Couch gag: The couch and the floor are covered in bubble wrap, which the Simpsons pop.

Episode chronology
← Previous "Luca$"	Next → "What to Expect When Bart's Expecting"
- The Simpsons season 25

"Days of Future Future" is the eighteenth episode of the twenty-fifth season of the American animated television series The Simpsons and the 548th episode of the series. It first aired on the Fox network in the United States on April 13, 2014. It was written by J. Stewart Burns and directed by Bob Anderson.

The episode follows the 2005 episode "Future-Drama" and the 2011 episode "Holidays of Future Passed", set 30 years from the present. In this futuristic installment, Bart goes to a clinic to rid himself of his feelings for his ex-wife Jenda, who is now dating a xenomorph-like alien named Jerry, Lisa must choose whether or not to cure her zombie husband Milhouse after he gets bitten by a homeless zombie, and Marge, after putting up with years of Homer dying and being cloned back to life by Professor Frink, loads Homer onto a flatscreen monitor and throws him out of the house. Amy Poehler guest starred as Jenda. The episode received mixed reviews.

== Plot ==
Homer suddenly dies. At his funeral, Professor Frink announces he has cloned Homer, and Marge warns Homer to take this second chance seriously. After thirty years of clones dying, Frink cannot revive Homer but stores his memory in a flash drive, which he plugs into a monitor. Realizing her husband is just a face on a screen, Marge gives the flash drive to Bart until she is not mad at him. Milhouse laments to Marge that he and his wife Lisa have nothing to talk about. Bart brings Homer home, an abandoned classroom at Springfield Elementary. Bart sadly sends his two sons to his ex-wife Jenda's house. He needs advice, but Homer is of no use when the monitor freezes. Unable to move on from his ex, Bart uses shock therapy to give him closure from his divorce. Meanwhile, at Lisa's zombie soup kitchen, Milhouse is attacked by a zombie.

Bart starts sleeping with other women. Bart visits Marge, who claims to not miss Homer but actually does. At Bart's apartment, Homer is given a robot suit. Bart is visited by his sons and ask him to help Jenda with her depression. She shows up in tears, telling Bart that Jerry left her. Bart comforts her and says her crying is a reminder of what he lost. Jenda is impressed by Bart's newfound maturity and invites him to dinner while Homer watches their sons. It goes well, and the two mend their relationship. Meanwhile, Lisa and zombie Milhouse are attacked by bullies, and Lisa finds it attractive that Milhouse fights them off.

Later, Bart and Jenda resume their habits of not paying attention to each other while Lisa prefers that Milhouse remain a zombie instead of being cured. Bart and Lisa go to Moe's to deal with their respective marital problems where Marge tells them to stick through it. She electrocutes herself to live in the flash drive with Homer. Milhouse is cured, and Bart moves on from Jenda, who is seeing Jerry again. Suddenly, Bart is back in the therapist's chair and learns what he experienced was a neural implant.

Bart and Lisa visit Marge, who is back with Homer after giving him a robot body and new personality. Bart recommends Lisa move on if things do not work with Milhouse, but Lisa says Milhouse is still a zombie and there is no cure, which pleases her.

== Production ==
In September 2013, Entertainment Weekly reported that Amy Poehler would reprise her role as Jenda in a followup to the sixteenth season episode "Future-Drama." Executive producer Al Jean said that the episode would feature Bart getting over his divorce from Jenda.

The couch gag was based on an idea by Katie Hemming of Burlington, Ontario. A couch gag contest was held the previous season, and Ray Savaya won the Canadian fan vote. However, the writers preferred Hemming's idea, so they decided to make hers as well. Although she did not win the grand prize, she received a "Simpsonized" drawing of herself and a first season DVD box set.

== Cultural references ==
Bart has his memories altered with a method similarly depicted in the 1990 film Total Recall. Gort from the 1951 film The Day the Earth Stood Still is shown working in a restaurant.

A fake promotion for the next episode is played over the end credits in the style of promotions for the next episode of the television series Mad Men. It is a commentary on how the promotions for Mad Men reveal nothing due to creator Matthew Weiner disliking spoilers, which prompted parodies of promotions for other television series.

== Reception ==
Dennis Perkins of The A.V. Club gave the episode a C, saying "Things are even worse for The Simpsons after tonight's sequel, 'Days Of Future Future,' where Burns returns to the (it seems) inevitable sci-fi future of the series and limits the show's world even more. Losing much of the heart of its predecessor in favor of the sort of ill-conceived and contradictory character arcs the latter, scattershot Simpsons has become notorious for, 'Days Of Future Future' reveals a series willing to shrug off what it still could be. Instead, this future Simpsons world seems just a playground for writers to use up whatever Futurama jokes they had left over."

Tony Sokol of Den of Geek gave the episode four out of five stars, saying "The Simpsons's 'Days of Future Future' is a laugh every 2.5 seconds, allowing for wind resistance. A very worthy entry into what will someday be an even longer running longest running show that has ever walked slowly up a flight of stairs. I absolutely love Jerry, Bart's future ex-wife's new soon to be ex-Alien lover. Nelson's mom still has to strip at the age of 87 because there is no more retirement. Even with 99 Democrats in the Senate, because the Republican still knows how to get things his way. Of course Ralph Wiggum will be the new chief of police, he is a chip off the old cop. Santa's Little Hybrid is an unnatural progression that Cosmo does not teach about."

Teresa Lopez of TV Fanatic gave the episode four out of five stars, saying "I always love The Simpsons episodes that show the possible futures of Bart, Lisa, Maggie, Homer and Marge. And this week was no exception. Even though the future episodes are not technically canon (I mean, who can say what will really happen in their future?), I liked that this one attempted some continuity.

The episode received a 1.7 rating and was watched by a total of 3.64 million people, making it the second most watched show on Animation Domination.
