= 1969 in anime =

The events of 1969 in anime.

== Releases ==
English name	Japanese name	Type	Demographic	Regions
Space Journey: The First Dream of Wonder-kun	ワンダー君の初夢宇宙旅行 (Wonder-kun no Hatsu Yume Uchuu Ryokou)	Special	Children	JA
The Secrets of Akko-chan	(Himitsu no Akko-chan)	TV	Shōjo	JA
Marine Boy	海底少年マリン (Kaitei Shōnen Marin)	TV	Shōnen	JA
Till a City Beneath the Sea is Built	海底都市の出来るまで (Kaitei Toshi no Dekiru Made)	Movie	General	JA
The Wonderful World of Puss 'n Boots	長靴をはいた猫 (Nagagutsu o Haita Neko)	Movie	Family, Children	JA
Freckled Pucchi	そばかすプッチー (Sobakasu Pucchi)	TV	Children	JA
Denka the Dried Plum	ウメ星デンカ (Umeboshi Denka)	TV	Children	JA
Judo Boy	紅三四郎 (Kurenai Sanshirō)	TV	Shōnen	JA
Furious Ataro	もーれつア太郎 (Mōretsu Atarō)	TV	Shōnen	JA
Dororo and Hyakkimaru	どろろと百鬼丸 (Dororo to Hyakkimaru)	TV	Shōnen	JA
The Chronicles of Kamui the Ninja	忍風カムイ外伝 (Ninpū Kamui Gaiden)	TV	Seinen	JA
Six Broken Laws	六法やぶれクン (Roppou Yabure-kun)	TV	Seinen	JA
A Thousand and One Nights	千夜一夜物語 (Senya Ichiya Monogatari)	Movie	Adult	JA, NA
Flying Phantom Ship	空飛ぶゆうれい船 (Soratobu Yūreisen)	Movie	Shōnen	JA
Star of the Giants: The Bloody Finals	巨人の星 血ぞめの決勝戦 (Kyojin no Hoshi: Chizome no Kesshōusen)	Movie	Shōnen	JA
Pinch & Punch	ピンチとパンチ (Pinch to Punch)	TV	Children	JA
The Ideal Man Boy's Gang Leader	男一匹ガキ大将 - Otoko Ippiki Gaki Daishou	TV	Shōnen	JA
Tiger Mask	タイガーマスク (Taigā Masuku)	TV	Shōnen	JA
Moomin	ムーミン (Mūmin)	TV	Family, Children	JA
The Genie Family	ハクション大魔王 (Hakushon Daimaō)	TV	Children	JA
Sazae	サザエさん (Sazae-san)	TV	Family, Children	JA
(Secret) Gekiga Ukiyo-e Thousand and One Nights	(秘)劇画 浮世絵千一夜 (Maruhi Gekiga, Ukiyoe Senichiya)	Movie	Adult	JA
Attack No. 1	アタックNo. 1 (Atakku Nanbā Wan)	TV	Shōjo	JA
Star of the Giants: Go Go Hyūma	巨人の星 行け行け飛雄馬 (Kyojin no Hoshi: Ike Ike Hyūma)	Movie	Shōnen	JA
Tomorrow's Joe: Pilot Film	あしたのジョー パイロットフィルム (Ashita no Joe Pairotto Firumu)	Special	Shōnen	JA
Dona, Dona	ドナ ドナ (Donna Donna)	Special	Children	JA
Lupin the Third: Pilot Film	ルパン三世〈PILOT FILM〉 (Rupan Sansei (Pairotto Firumu))	Special	Seinen	JA
Tragedy on the G Line	G線上の悲劇 (G Sejou no Higeki)	Short	General	JA
44 Cats	44ひきのねこ (Shijushi-hiki no Neko)	Short	Children	JA

== See also ==
- 1969 in animation
