= Roxy Rocket =

Comic book character

- Concept art for Roxy Rocket.

Publication information
- Publisher: DC Comics
- First appearance: The Batman Adventures Annual #1
- Created by: Paul Dini; Bruce Timm

In-story information
- Alter ego: Roxanne Sutton
- Species: Human
- Team affiliations: Penguin
- Abilities: Skilled acrobat, mechanic, pilot, and stunt double; Expertise in seduction and unarmed combat

Roxy Rocket (Roxanne Sutton) is a supervillain appearing in media published by DC Comics. She was created in 1994 for the DC Animated Universe comic series The Batman Adventures before appearing in the animated series The New Batman Adventures and Superman: The Animated Series. In 2006, the character was introduced to the main DC Universe.

== Fictional character biography ==
=== DC Animated Universe ===
Roxy Rocket was created for the DC Animated Universe, voiced by Charity James.

Introduced in The New Batman Adventures, Roxanne Sutton worked as a stunt double until she was fired after her stunts became too dangerous for any company to insure her. Out of work, but still hungering for thrills, Sutton began stealing jewels for the Penguin. Batman also takes risks in his attempts to catch Roxy in midair chases, leading Roxy to believe Batman was a kindred spirit who understood the pleasure of risk-taking. Roxy realizes that her feelings were unrequited when Batman has her arrested.

Roxy next appears in the Superman: The Animated Series episode "Knight Time", where she attempts to commit crime in Metropolis during Batman's disappearance before being defeated by Superman.

Roxy Rocket appears in The Batman Adventures Annual #1 where she vows to "straighten up and fly right". She is seen robbing a safe on a security camera, but it turns out she was framed by Catwoman. Angered at this, she tries, along with Batman, to apprehend her which results in a fight between the two women. Catwoman tries to hold her hostage with the intent of killing her, but Roxy manages to get away and knocks her off the rooftop with a punch.

=== Comics ===
Roxy Rocket is introduced to the main comic continuity in Detective Comics #822, written by Paul Dini. She is trying to shake Batman off her rocket after she has stolen ion thruster plans from S.T.A.R. Labs, but this does not work. They crash high on the Sprang River Bridge and it takes Batman an hour and a half to get them both down.

== Analysis ==
Paul Dini has stated that Roxy is among the favorite characters he created: "She's a character Bruce Timm and I created for the first Batman Adventures Annual. We always liked her, so we created a television story for her. Sparks fly in that one".

Bruce Timm called the television episode "probably the most blatantly risqué episode we've ever done".

== Powers and abilities ==
Roxy has no powers, but displays an exceptional skill in acrobatics and stunts due to her former employment as a stunt double. She is a skilled rocket operator and hand-to-hand combatant.

== In other media ==
=== Television ===
- Roxy Rocket appears in the Justice League Action episode "The Fatal Fare", voiced by Gillian Jacobs. This version is the head of a space transportation company and rival of Space Cabbie.
- Roxy Rocket appears in the Batman: Caped Crusader episode "Rocket's Red Glare", voiced by Wunmi Mosaku. Instead of being a pilot, this version is a scientist with a steam punk aesthetic and wears a flight suit that resembles the Rocketeer.

=== Video games ===
- Roxy Rocket appears as a boss in Batman: Chaos in Gotham.
- Roxy Rocket appears as a character summon in Scribblenauts Unmasked: A DC Comics Adventure.

== See also ==
- List of Batman family enemies
