= Space Cabbie =

- Space Cabbie as depicted in DC Super-Stars #6 (August 1976). Art by Ernie Chan.

Publication information
- Publisher: DC Comics
- First appearance: Mystery in Space #21 (August 1954)
- Created by: Otto Binder (writer); Howard Sherman (artist)

In-story information
- Team affiliations: Justice League
- Notable aliases: Space Cabby
- Abilities: Expert driver

Space Cabbie (also spelled Space Cabby) is a science fiction taxi driver in DC Comics.

== Publication history ==
Space Cabbie first appeared in Mystery in Space #21 (August 1954) in a story scripted by Otto Binder and drawn by Howard Sherman. The character reappeared in issue #24, in the story "The Hitchhiker of Space", written by France Herron and again drawn by Sherman, and thereafter became a recurring series in Mystery in Space, the only such in the book for the whole time that the series was being first printed. Besides Binder, Gardner Fox would write many appearances, and artwork was handled by Gil Kane and Bernard Sachs. Space Cabbie's monthly series continued to 1958 with Mystery in Space #47; the character's last appearance as a lead feature would be in August 1972 in From Beyond the Unknown #18, a reprint of "The Hitchhiker of Space". His last solo appearance in a comic book was in DC Super Stars #6 which was published in August 1976 and written by Binder.

Space Cabbie has since then made occasional guest appearances in other comics, such as Starman, and DC Comics Presents #78. He was mentioned in one issue of the "New 52" series Threshold, about a bounty/game in space, and later made several appearances in the series Hal Jordan and the Green Lantern Corps as an underworld informant of the Green Lantern Guy Gardner.

== Fictional character biography ==
Space Cabbie lives in the mid-22nd century, driving for 9-Planet Taxi. As a child, he grew up among the military tyrants of Ghengkis VII. He showed an aptitude for stellar navigation. During the 'Bored Wars' of 2146, he was a fighter pilot. He took jobs as a laborer and a pilot for hire. He eventually took up driving cab #7433. He is a member of the 'Cosmic Order Of Space Cab Pilots' and 'Veterans Of Alien Wars'.

His first appearance is as a narrator, telling tales to his fares. Over the next handful of issues, he has his cab stolen, meets his exact double and has to deal with a mail bomb. His adventures are told in the title Mystery in Space. The series ends with issue #47, where he has to deal with three doubles.

At one point, he and his cab are co-opted by Lobo to chase down a gang of space bikers. Lobo leaves Space Cabbie, who is charged with reckless driving, murder, and other crimes. On the way to prison, Lobo saves him and returns his cab. The discrepancy of a modern-age character appearing with a 'future' one is explained when Space Cabbie mentions on the witness stand that he took a day job in the present to help make ends meet.

An older version of Space Cabbie with an artificial leg is seen assisting the Green Lantern Corps with vital intelligence information. Space Cabbie has his taxi upgraded with a Mother Box engine, allowing faster and farther fares.

== In other media ==
=== Television ===
- Space Cabbie appears in Justice League Action, voiced by Patton Oswalt. This version is a contemporary rival of Roxy Rocket.
- Space Cabbie makes a non-speaking appearance in the Harley Quinn episode "Something Borrowed, Something Green".

=== Video games ===
Space Cabbie appears as a character summon in Scribblenauts Unmasked: A DC Comics Adventure.

=== Miscellaneous ===
- Space Cabbie appears in Justice League Unlimited #18.
- Space Cabbie appears in Batman: The Brave and the Bold #16.
