= Justice League Action =

American animated television series

- Genre: Action; Adventure; Science fantasy Superhero; Comedy; Crossover
- Based on: Justice League by: Gardner Fox
- Voices of: Kevin Conroy; Rachel Kimsey; Jason J. Lewis
- Composer: Kevin Riepl
- Country of origin: United States
- Original language: English
- No. of seasons: 1
- No. of episodes: 52 (list of episodes)

Production
- Executive producer: Sam Register
- Producers: Butch Lukic; Alan Burnett; Jim Krieg
- Editor: Bruce A. King
- Running time: 12 minutes 3 minutes (shorts)
- Production companies: DC Entertainment; Warner Bros. Animation

Original release
- Network: Cartoon Network
- Release: December 16, 2016 – June 3, 2018

Related
- Justice League; Justice League Unlimited

Justice League Action is an American superhero animated television series based on the DC Comics superhero team Justice League. The series is produced by Jim Krieg, Butch Lukic, and Alan Burnett. The show debuted on Cartoon Network UK on November 26, 2016, and premiered in the United States on Cartoon Network on December 16 the same year. The first season concluded on June 3, 2018, marking an end to the series.

== Plot ==
The series features the adventures of Superman, Batman, Wonder Woman and all the members of the Justice League as they fight various megavillains and other threats to protect Earth.

== Voice cast ==
Cast of Justice League Action
Voice Actor	Character(s)
Kevin Conroy	Batman / Bruce Wayne
Rachel Kimsey	Wonder Woman / Diana Prince; Sis; Bleez
Jason J. Lewis	Superman / Kal-El / Clark Kent; General Zod; DeSaad; Krypto; Streaky the Supercat; Boss Kack; Carmine Falcone; Rath; Biff; Chancellor Al-On; Quex-Ul; Dex-Starr; Red Tornado
Jonathan Adams	Darkseid
John Astin	Uncle Dudley
Sean Astin	Shazam / Billy Batson
Jake T. Austin	Blue Beetle / Jaime Reyes
Diedrich Bader	Booster Gold; Uthool; H.I.V.E. Master (second appearance)
Troy Baker	Hawkman; Jonas Glim; Kanto
Hannibal Buress	Mister Terrific / Michael Holt
Dayci Brookshire	Zatanna (young)
P. J. Byrne	Firestorm / Ronnie Raymond
Lacey Chabert	Zatanna Zatara
Gary Cole	Black Adam
Jon Cryer	Felix Faust
Darin De Paul	Sinestro
Trevor Devall	Cain; Jonah Hex
John DiMaggio	Lobo; Mongul
Chris Diamantopoulos	Green Arrow / Oliver Queen; Nyorlath; H.I.V.E. Master (first appearance); Metallo
Melissa Disney	Mom; Brat
Dan Donohue	Brother Night; Merlin (first appearance)
Michael Dorn	Atrocitus
Noel Fisher	Klarion the Witch Boy
Crispin Freeman	Martian Manhunter / J'onn J'onzz / John Jones
Gilbert Gottfried	Mister Mxyzptlk
Grey Griffin	Navigation Computer
Julianne Grossman	Hippolyta
Mark Hamill	Joker; Swamp Thing; Trickster; Himself
Ely Henry	Calculator
Gillian Jacobs	Roxy Rocket
Ken Jeong	Toyman
Peter Jessop	Steppenwolf
Josh Keaton	Green Lantern / Hal Jordan
John de Lancie	Brainiac
Natalie Lander	Stargirl / Courtney Whitmore; Timmy
Cloris Leachman	Granny Goodness
Natasha Leggero	Poison Ivy
Thomas Lennon	Amazo
David Lodge	Calythos
Jon Lovitz	Sid Sharp
Erica Luttrell	Doctor Fate (young)
Piotr Michael	Kalibak; Perry White
Max Mittelman	Parasite; Jimmy Olsen
Jasika Nicole	Vixen
Jerry O'Connell	Atom (Ray Palmer)
Damian O'Hare	John Constantine; Abnegazar; Professor Anderson
Patton Oswalt	Space Cabbie
Khary Payton	Cyborg; Kanjar Ro
Robert Picardo	Two-Face
Laura Post	Circe; Big Barda
Dania Ramirez	Red Velvet
Carl Reiner	Wizard
Paula Rhodes	John Constantine (young)
Andy Richter	Chronos
William Salyers	Virman Vundabar
Charlie Schlatter	The Flash / Barry Allen
Patrick Seitz	Etrigan the Demon / Jason Blood; Merlin (second appearance)
Armin Shimerman	Zilius Zox
Kevin Shinick	Dad
Christian Slater	Deadshot
Roger Craig Smith	Mister Miracle
Dana Snyder	Plastic Man; Penguin / Oswald Cobblepot
David Sobolov	Gorilla Grodd
Brent Spiner	Riddler
Joanne Spracklen	Supergirl / Kara Zor-El
Peter Stormare	Mr. Freeze
Tara Strong	Harley Quinn; Lois Lane; Ember; Batman (young)
Mena Suvari	Killer Frost
Fred Tatasciore	Solomon Grundy
Stephen Tobolowsky	Martin Stein
Oliver Vaquer	Mister Mind
Jim Ward	Brain
Jessica Walter	Athena
Travis Willingham	Bizarro
Fryda Wolff	Faora
James Woods	Lex Luthor

== Crew ==
- Aaron Chavda – Visual FX Animation
- Wes Gleason – Voice director
- Brett Hardin – Design and visual FX animation
- Shane Glines – Character designer

== Series overview ==
Overview of Justice League Action seasons
Season	Episodes	Originally aired	
Season	Episodes	First aired	Last aired
1	52	November 26, 2016 (UK); December 16, 2016 (US)	June 3, 2018 (US)
Shorts	22	June 29, 2017	December 21, 2017

== Episodes ==
=== Season 1 (2016–18) ===
Justice League Action, season 1 episodes
No.	Title	Directed by	Written by	Original release date	US viewers (millions)
1	"Classic Rock (Shazam Slam: Part 1)"	Jake Castorena	Patrick Rieger	December 16, 2016	1.11
Believing he is saving a homeless man from strange creatures while on patrol in Gotham City, Batman intervenes for the Wizard who is on a mission to stop Black Adam, who has captured Billy Batson and plans to free the Brothers Djinn from their imprisonment in the Rock of Eternity.
2	"Power Outage (Shazam Slam: Part 2)"	Jake Castorena	Heath Corson	November 26, 2016 (UK); December 16, 2016 (US)	1.11
Superman, Wonder Woman, and Martian Manhunter try to stop the Djinn Calythos who has possessed Parasite during his rampage at Stryker's Island, steals their powers, and plans to use his scimitar to raise a volcano in Metropolis as part of the Brothers Djinn's plot to revert Earth back to its primordial state.
3	"Night of the Bat (Shazam Slam: Part 3)"	Doug Murphy	Heath Corson	December 16, 2016	1.11
Working with Green Arrow, Batman chases after the Djinn Uthool, but is possessed by him, transforming into a monstrous fusion of the two. Meanwhile, the other two Djinn break into the Hall of Justice in a plot to use it to raise the Earth's core temperature.
4	"Abate and Switch (Shazam Slam: Part 4)"	Jake Castorena	Patrick Rieger	December 16, 2016	1.11
Superman, Batman, and Wonder Woman pursue the remaining Djinn Abnegazar, Rath, and Nyorlath where they plan to reopen Calythos' volcano, and drain Superman and Wonder Woman's powers upon saying their name. John Constantine arrives to help them as Green Arrow, Plastic Man, and Swamp Thing also arrive to fight the three Djinn. Afterwards, Black Adam breaks free from his Earthly imprisonment to fight the heroes as Batman arrives with Shazam and the Justice League to fight him and the remaining Djinn.
5	"Follow That Space Cab!"	Jake Castorena	Paul Dini	November 26, 2016 (UK); January 21, 2017 (US)	0.65
Superman teams up with Hawkman and Space Cabbie to protect Mister Mind from the intergalactic bounty hunter Lobo, who seeks to hand him over to an intergalactic crime lord named Boss Kack after double-crossing fellow bounty hunter Jonas Glim.
6	"Nuclear Family Values"	Doug Murphy	Paul Dini	November 27, 2016 (UK); January 28, 2017 (US)	0.76
With most of the Justice League unavailable, Firestorm is the only one to stop a family of androids called the Nuclear Family from blowing up a nuclear power plant.
7	"Zombie King"	Jake Castorena	Paul Dini	December 3, 2016 (UK); February 4, 2017 (US)	0.87
Batman teams up with John Constantine, Zatanna, and Swamp Thing to stop Solomon Grundy, who is trying to raise a zombie army using a magical gem.
8	"Galaxy Jest"	Jake Castorena	Duane Capizzi	December 4, 2016 (UK); February 11, 2017 (US)	0.83
After planting a laughing gas bomb somewhere in Gotham, the Joker is abducted by Mongul. Subsequently, Superman and Wonder Woman must rescue him while Batman and Flash search for the bomb.
9	"Time Share"	Shaunt Nigoghossian	Josie Campbell	December 10, 2016 (UK); February 18, 2017 (US)	0.74
While chasing Chronos, Batman and Blue Beetle are transported back in time to the former's first night as a superhero, where he worked to bring down Carmine Falcone and his men. The two must stop Chronos and prevent him from altering the timeline to erase Batman from existence. Note: The theme song from Batman: The Animated Series was used as Past Batman's theme.
10	"Under a Red Sun"	Doug Murphy	Story by : Shannon Denton; Teleplay by : Heath Corson	December 11, 2016 (UK); February 25, 2017 (US)	0.83
After a brief team up with Batman and Big Barda in their battle against the Parademons, Superman is transported to a planet orbiting a red sun by Steppenwolf as part of Steppenwolf's plan to kill Superman and become a legend. Now with his powers slowly depleting, Superman must defeat Steppenwolf and get back to Earth. Meanwhile, Batman and Big Barda head to Darkseid's fortress on Apokolips to track down Superman, encountering Virman Vundabar in the process.
11	"Play Date"	Shaunt Nigoghossian	Paul Dini	December 17, 2016 (UK); March 4, 2017 (US)	0.90
Toyman and his army of toys invade the Justice League Watchtower and turn Wonder Woman, Superman, Cyborg, and Batman into players in a twisted version of a fighting game. Now Cyborg will need all of his gaming skills to defeat Toyman and escape.
12	"Repulse!"	Curt Geda	Jeremy Adams	December 18, 2016 (UK); March 11, 2017 (US)	0.74
While out with Wonder Woman, Superman is infected with nanobots that deflect anything near them. As Wonder Woman and Hawkman try to find a way to save him, Superman attempts to remove the nanobots by flying near a black hole.
13	"Trick or Threat"	Doug Murphy	Paul Dini	December 24, 2016 (UK); March 18, 2017 (US)	0.67
Cain the Caretaker tells the audience a Halloween tale about the House of Mystery where Klarion the Witch Boy transforms Batman, Zatanna, Constantine, and Doctor Fate into amnesiac children in an attempt to steal the Helmet of Fate. After falling for Klarion's trap and regaining their memories, the heroes must stop Klarion and escape the House of Mystery before it disappears by midnight.
14	"Speed Demon"	Doug Murphy	Paul Dini	December 11, 2016 (Poland); March 25, 2017 (US)	0.63
After defeating a magically-enhanced Harley Quinn, Batman and Zatanna encounter Ember and her boss Brother Night. Brother Night uses his dark magic to animate and control the Batmobile, who traps Zatanna in its trunk. With the help of Etrigan the Demon, Batman must save her and defeat Brother Night and Ember, as Etrigan enlists Merlin to enchant an ice cream van for a high-speed battle.
15	"Hat Trick"	Shaunt Nigoghossian	Duane Capizzi	December 11, 2016 (Poland); April 8, 2017 (US)	0.62
Felix Faust steals Zatanna's hat to free a massive demon called Ghast and regain his youth by performing a summoning ritual at the Hebrides. While Batman and Etrigan battle Ghast to keep him from getting to the mainland, Zatanna uses every trick in her arsenal to retrieve her hat.
16	"Luthor in Paradise"	Jake Castorena	Matt Wayne and Stan Berkowitz	December 11, 2016 (Poland); April 29, 2017 (US)	0.79
With help from the seductive witch Circe, Lex Luthor invades the Amazon island of Wonder Woman's homeworld, Themyscira, to obtain a mystical staff from Hippolyta that leads to the Fallen Realm. Their goal upon arriving in the Fallen Realm is to obtain the Oculus of the Argo, an artifact of the Olympian Gods that would give anyone that wields it the powers of Zeus. With help from Superman and Batman, Wonder Woman must find a way to stop those villains before they obtain the Oculus.
17	"Plastic Man Saves the World"	Shaunt Nigoghossian	Heath Corson	January 15, 2017 (UK); May 6, 2017 (US)	0.73
While Superman, Batman, Cyborg, and Vixen try to stop Brainiac, Plastic Man sneaks into Brainiac's spaceship to destroy the shrink ray and save the world to prove that he is a worthy superhero.
18	"Field Trip"	Jake Castorena	Josie Campbell	January 21, 2017 (UK); May 13, 2017 (US)	0.58
As Superman gives Blue Beetle, Firestorm, and Stargirl a tour of the Fortress of Solitude, they accidentally free General Zod, Faora, and Quex-Ul from the Phantom Zone and trap Superman within it. With no one able to assist them, the three teenage superheroes must work together to stop the Kryptonian villains.
19	"Rage of the Red Lanterns"	Jake Castorena	Ernie Altbacker	December 18, 2016 (Poland); May 20, 2017 (US)	0.66
Lobo steals three newly-forged rings from the Red Lanterns and pits Atrocitus, Bleez, Dex-Starr, Zilius Zox, and Skallox against Batman, Superman, Wonder Woman, and Cyborg. After Lobo steals the Spider Gauntlet in the League's possession, the Justice League and the Red Lanterns must team up to defeat him.
20	"Freezer Burn"	Jake Castorena	Jeremy Adams	December 18, 2016 (Poland); May 27, 2017 (US)	0.66
Batman and Firestorm battle Mr. Freeze and Killer Frost, who are working together to freeze Gotham. However, after Mr. Freeze betrays Killer Frost and uses her as a power source for his freeze ray, she reluctantly decides to aid the heroes in stopping him.
21	"Inside Job"	Doug Murphy	Heath Corson	March 11, 2017 (France); June 3, 2017 (US)	0.61
When Lex Luthor infects Superman with a nanobot swarm that sucks up his solar energy, Atom shrinks Batman and Wonder Woman down to micro-size so that they can enter his bloodstream and dispose of the nanobots.
22	"The Trouble with Truth"	Shaunt Nigoghossian	Mairghread Scott	March 11, 2017 (France); June 3, 2017 (US)	0.61
Athena shows up wanting Wonder Woman to relocate to Mount Olympus so that she can fill in the position of Goddess of Truth. To see if Wonder Woman is worthy, Athena follows her, Batman, and Green Arrow on their mission to stop H.I.V.E. from detonating a cobalt fusion bomb at the docks.
23	"Double Cross"	Shaunt Nigoghossian	Jonathan Callan	March 10, 2017 (Canada); June 10, 2017 (US)	0.76
Batman and Firestorm have kidnapped Two-Face, and enlist Plastic Man to pose as him and lure Deadshot into a trap, leaving the real Two-Face under Firestorm's watch. Things go well at first until Two-Face escapes custody.
24	"Battle for the Bottled City"	Shaunt Nigoghossian	Heath Corson	January 29, 2017 (UK); June 17, 2017 (US)	0.68
After the events of "Plastic Man Saves the World", Atom shrinks Superman down to microscopic size so that he can enter the Bottled City of Kandor that was previously in Brainiac's possession. When Brainiac breaks into the Fortress of Solitude, defeats Cyborg, and reclaims the bottle, Atom must try to stop Brainiac on his own with the help of some Superman robots.
25	"Garden of Evil"	Shaunt Nigoghossian	Paul Dini	March 11, 2017 (France); June 24, 2017 (US)	0.64
When Swamp Thing has a blind date with Poison Ivy which leads to her controlling him in her plot to overrun Gotham City with monstrous plants, Batman works on an antidote to free Swamp Thing from Poison Ivy's control. Meanwhile, Poison Ivy is collaborating with Harley Quinn to help her keep Swamp Thing in check. Superman, Firestorm, and Vixen work to fight the Queens of Crime on their home turf.
26	"All Aboard the Space Train"	Doug Murphy	Ray Utarnachitt	March 11, 2017 (France); July 1, 2017 (US)	0.62
Batman and Cyborg enlist the help of Space Cabbie and a defrosted Jonah Hex to stop Kanjar Ro from hijacking an intergalactic space train.
27	"Time Out"	Jake Castorena	Jonathan Callan	July 8, 2017	0.68
After Wonder Woman freezes in time following a fight with H.I.V.E., Batman teams up with Booster Gold when a creature called the Chronovore starts literally eating up time.
28	"The Fatal Fare"	Doug Murphy	Paul Dini	May 28, 2017 (Scandinavia); July 15, 2017 (US)	0.66
While dealing with a competition in Roxy Rocket, Space Cabbie inadvertently learns about a great threat to the Justice League when one of his passengers turns out to be Darkseid. Upon taking him to one of the moons of a planet, Space Cabbie discovers that Darkseid, DeSaad, and Kanto are torturing Superman with the virus in their Mother Box. Space Cabbie ends up doing a trick that ends up bringing Hawkman and Swamp Thing to his aid.
29	"Mxy's Mix-Up"	Doug Murphy	Jim Krieg	July 22, 2017	0.56
As Superman and Batman take Stargirl on a ride-along to protect the United Nations from Gorilla Grodd and his army of gorillas, Mister Mxyzptlk appears and causes chaos by body-swapping the Leaguers. When the Justice League's bravo team and Firestorm arrive and are affected as well, they must find a way to trick Mister Mxyzptlk into saying his name backward and defeat Grodd.
30	"Supernatural Adventures in Babysitting"	Shaunt Nigoghossian	Ernie Altbacker	July 29, 2017	0.59
After helping Batman take down some criminals, Stargirl babysits Professor Anderson's son Timmy while he is away. During this time, Klarion invades Professor Anderson's house and poses as Timmy to obtain the Magdalene Grimoire. After Klarion finds the Grimoire and sheds his disguise, Stargirl notifies Batman, who brings John Constantine to help her.
31	"Booster's Gold"	Jake Castorena	Jim Krieg	August 9, 2017 (Portugal); August 12, 2017 (US)	0.46
After arriving on an island near the Bermuda Triangle when looking for Booster Gold, Green Arrow discovers that he has brought dinosaurs back from the past for a money-making venture after seeing a movie where scientists cloned the dinosaurs back to life.
32	"Boo-ray for Bizarro"	Doug Murphy	Heath Corson	August 10, 2017 (Portugal); August 19, 2017 (US)	0.72
When Amazo attacks Superman, Wonder Woman, Batman, Flash, Green Lantern, and Martian Manhunter and begins replicating their powers, Bizarro becomes the Justice League's last hope to turn things around.
33	"Best Day Ever"	Jake Castorena	Paul Dini	August 10, 2017 (Portugal); August 26, 2017 (US)	0.52
Joker springs Lex Luthor from prison with the help of a Mother Box. Superman, Wonder Woman, Batman, and Flash must work to catch them all over the world.
34	"The Cube Root"	Shaunt Nigoghossian	Story by : Ernie Altbacker; Teleplay by : Jennifer Muro	August 14, 2017 (Portugal); September 2, 2017 (US)	0.54
Firestorm attends the opening of the new Science Center established by Martin Stein's old college roommate Mister Terrific until it gets crashed by Calculator. When Calculator hacks Mister Terrific's T-spheres, separates Firestorm back into Ronnie Raymond and Martin Stein, and kidnaps the former, it's up to Martin and Mister Terrific to work together to free Ronnie and defeat Calculator.
35	"Superman's Pal, Sid Sharp"	Jake Castorena	Brian Ford Sullivan	August 14, 2017 (Portugal); September 9, 2017 (US)	0.60
Struggling Daily Planet reporter Sid Sharp has aspirations on becoming a superhero and has been having problems with Clark Kent beating him to the Superman stories. When the Parademons mistake Sid for Superman, Darkseid plans to lure Superman into a trap that is manned by DeSaad, Granny Goodness, Kalibak, and Kanto.
36	"Superman Red vs Superman Blue"	Doug Murphy	Heath Corson	August 15, 2017 (Portugal); September 16, 2017 (US)	0.64
Upon stealing an invention from a laboratory, Lex Luthor comes up with the means to separate each Justice Leaguer in two: the blue one being passive and good, the red one being aggressive and mean. He does this on Superman, Wonder Woman, and Batman as the blue sides of them work with Green Arrow to stop Lex Luthor and their red counterparts from doing the same thing to all of Earth.
37	"The Ringer"	Shaunt Nigoghossian	Jennifer Muro	August 16, 2017 (Portugal); September 23, 2017 (US)	0.52
Sinestro's ring is suddenly much more powerful than usual during his fight with Green Lantern. Superman and Wonder Woman send a microscopic Atom into his ring to find out what the cause might be. While the others fight Sinestro, Atom fights past the fear parts of the power ring and finds the battery to Sinestro's power ring inside being guarded by Sinestro Corps member Despotellis.
38	"Forget Me Not"	Shaunt Nigoghossian	Jeremy Adams	August 16, 2017 (Portugal); September 30, 2017 (US)	0.57
Firestorm finds that Superman, Wonder Woman, and Batman are in their civilian identities and have no memory of them being superheroes. He discovers that Felix Faust is behind this. Firestorm must find a way to get rid of their amnesia so that they can save Metropolis from an attack by Felix Faust and his army of Golems.
39	"The Brain Buster"	Doug Murphy	Geoffrey Thorne and John Semper	October 7, 2017	0.56
A mysterious creature abducts Batman, Mr. Terrific, Lex Luthor, Calculator, and Brain where it puts them to the test to discover the smartest among them. They are unaware that the mysterious creature is someone they'd least suspect.
40	"E. Nigma, Consulting Detective"	Shaunt Nigoghossian	Jonathan Callan	October 14, 2017	0.58
When the Joker traps Batman in one of his traps, Wonder Woman and Green Arrow decide against their better judgment to allow Riddler, who is trying to go straight, to help them track him down. Riddler assists them because Joker has stolen his riddle motives as he deciphers Joker's riddles that lead him, Wonder Woman, and Green Arrow to Solomon Grundy's cell, the Iceberg Lounge, and the Gotham Art Museum.
41	"Harley Goes Ape!"	Shaunt Nigoghossian	Paul Dini	October 21, 2017	0.64
When Gorilla Grodd takes control of the giant chimpanzee Titano, the only person who seems to be able to override his control is Harley Quinn, who nursed him as a chimp at S.T.A.R. Labs. Stargirl must help Harley free Titano so that Superman and Stargirl can defeat Gorilla Grodd.
42	"Phased and Confused"	Jake Castorena	Patrick Rieger	August 15, 2017 (Portugal); October 28, 2017 (US)	0.59
An explosion near the Sun opens a temporary rift into the Phantom Zone allowing General Zod to escape as he plans to free Faora and Quex-Ul. When members of the Justice League are affected by a fragment of Krypton and become phantom-like, their only hope for freedom is to somehow get a message to Booster Gold to return them to normal and stop General Zod before he frees Faora and Quex-Ul.
43	"It'll Take a Miracle!"	Jake Castorena	Jeremy Adams	November 4, 2017	0.63
Big Barda's life hangs in the balance when Darkseid forces Batman to track down the elusive Mister Miracle (who is Big Barda's boyfriend) and bring back the Anti-Life Equation he stole from Apokolips. Even when Batman finds Mister Miracle, he has to compete with Granny Goodness and the Female Furies members Bernadeth and Lashina to see who will get the Anti-Life Equation to Darkseid first.
44	"System Error"	Jake Castorena	Patrick Rieger	November 11, 2017	0.54
When Batman discovers that he and the rest of the Justice League are robots while fighting villains that don't normally team up, he, Superman, Wonder Woman, Cyborg, and Booster Gold investigate to find out who did this and why. They find their answers to be part of a research done by Darkseid, leaving them unable to attack him or the Parademons.
45	"Race Against Crime"	Doug Murphy	Jeremy Adams	November 18, 2017	0.69
Superman and Flash race for charity only to fall under a trap perpetrated by Lex Luthor who has devised a "time" suit with the help of Chronos that allows him to control everyone's speed.
46	"Party Animal"	Doug Murphy	Paul Dini and Tim Sheridan	December 2, 2017	0.52
Determined to finally throw a successful Christmas party for the Justice League, Green Arrow finds his plans thwarted when Plastic Man brings a tranquilized Solomon Grundy to the gathering.
47	"Watchtower Tours"	Jake Castorena	Tim Sheridan	December 10, 2017 (Poland); May 29, 2018 (US)	0.44
When Booster Gold and Skeets start giving tours of the Watchtower to make some extra cash, they inadvertently bring in Granny Goodness, Joker, and Toyman who are disguised as tourists.
48	"Barehanded"	Jake Castorena	Story by : Jim Krieg & Andy Breckman; Teleplay by : Jim Krieg	December 10, 2017 (Poland); May 30, 2018 (US)	0.41
When Green Lantern leaves his ring in an intergalactic restroom after washing his hands, he discovers it's gone. This leads him and Space Cabbie on a wild chase for the aliens who might have taken it. Note: At the end of the episode, Space Cabbie's new GPS is revealed to be an amnesiac Aya from Green Lantern: The Animated Series, who leaves in search of "something... or someone" (Razer).
49	"Captain Bamboozle"	Shaunt Nigoghossian	Marc Guggenheim	December 10, 2017 (Poland); May 31, 2018 (US)	0.41
Mister Mxyzptlk decides to create some mischief by endowing Shazam's well-meaning Uncle Dudley with superpowers bigger than anyone in the Justice League.
50	"Keeping Up with the Kryptonians"	Jake Castorena	Story by : Andrew Kreisberg & Lauren Certo; Teleplay by : Andrew Kreisberg & Lauren Certo and Tim Sheridan	December 17, 2017 (Poland); June 1, 2018 (US)	0.41
Mister Mxyzptlk alters history so that Supergirl and Superman are respectively a ditzy actress and Kaznian enforcer who never met. With the rest of the League erased from existence, the only one left to save the day is Booster Gold.
51	"Unleashed"	Doug Murphy	Tim Sheridan	December 17, 2017 (Poland); June 2, 2018 (US)	0.57
While the Justice League is away on a mission, Plastic Man is not only left in charge of the Watchtower, but also Superman's dog Krypto. He also allows a seemly lost cat in the tower, unaware that it is actually Dex-Starr, who Atrocitus sent to invade Earth on the League's absence.
52	"She Wore Red Velvet"	Shaunt Nigoghossian	Tim Sheridan	December 17, 2017 (Poland); June 3, 2018 (US)	0.46
When Booster Gold and the Justice League come under attack by a mysterious and unrelenting new villainess known as Red Velvet, Booster comes to realize she's actually the fiancée he left at the altar in the future.

=== Justice League Action Shorts (2017) ===
A short-form web series, "Justice League Action Shorts", began airing on the DC Kids' YouTube channel on June 29, 2017.

List of Justice League Action shorts
No.	Title	Directed by	Written by	Original release date
1	"Up And Atom!"	Doug Murphy	Eric Carrasco	June 29, 2017
When Atom is offered membership into the Justice League by Batman and Wonder Woman, he nearly passes on the idea until a Parademon attacks the Watchtower. He defeats the creature by shrinking and trapping it, and joins the Justice League afterward.
2	"Beep Beep!"	Doug Murphy	Tim Sheridan	June 29, 2017
After luring Superman and Flash to a desert planetoid, Lobo traps the latter in a Kryptonite cage and tries to use every trick in the book to catch the latter. Flash outsmarts the traps and ultimately defeats Lobo.
3	"Chemistry"	Doug Murphy	Jonathan Callan & Eric Carrasco	June 29, 2017
Firestorm is having a hard time trying to decide on what to say to impress Stargirl during a stakeout near one of H.I.V.E.'s bases.
4	"Good Cop, Bat Cop"	Doug Murphy	Jim Krieg	July 6, 2017
After Superman and Batman catch Deadshot, they use interrogation techniques in an attempt to force him to say who called the hit on Batman as Wonder Woman and Firestorm watch.
5	"It's A Trap!"	Doug Murphy	Jim Krieg	July 13, 2017
Luring Superman to a warehouse by claiming that he kidnapped a young girl named Brie Gruyère, Lex Luthor is confident that he knows more about Superman. Superman knew it was a trap, as both those names are types of cheese.
6	"Lasso of Lies"	Doug Murphy	Tim Sheridan	July 20, 2017
Deadshot targets Wonder Woman and she tries to get answers out of Deadshot on who hired him to take out Wonder Woman. When she tries to use her Lasso of Truth, she finds that Plastic Man is posing as it and that Booster Gold had borrowed it to help in his deal involving his Booster Car.
7	"Quality Time"	Doug Murphy	Paul Dini	July 27, 2017
While fighting Poison Ivy, Star Sapphire, Cheetah, and Ember, Superman, Wonder Woman, Batman, and Flash find that fighting villains together is all the time they share together. After the villains are defeated, the Justice League works to find another activity to do together when not fighting villains.
8	"Selfie Help!"	Doug Murphy	Tim Sheridan	August 3, 2017
Space Cabbie is willing to pay off his fare for some Super Hero selfies, but Batman hates having his picture taken after Space Cabbie had finished picking him up from New Genesis. During this time, Booster Gold photobombs Space Cabbie's selfies to promote his Golden Fizz drink leading up to Space Cabbie ending up in a holographic training simulator where Wonder Woman fights some Parademons.
9	"Special Delivery"	Doug Murphy	Paul Dini	August 10, 2017
Space Cabbie takes on Booster Gold and a female alien as his latest passengers. As Booster Gold is on the run from Granny Goodness and the two Parademons with her upon uploading a lot of selfies following the Justice League's fight on Apokolips, the female alien needs to get to Cosmos General Hospital when she goes into labour.
10	"Justice 1,2,3, Go!"	Doug Murphy	Shaunt Nigoghossian	August 17, 2017
In the jungle, Batman, Wonder Woman, Cyborg, and Plastic Man are looking for H.I.V.E.'s headquarters as they are attacked by missiles coming from an unseen location. When Plastic Man unknowingly deploys himself in the aircraft's submarine, he unexpectedly finds H.I.V.E's headquarters.
11	"Toymano a Mano"	Doug Murphy	Shaunt Nigoghossian	August 24, 2017
A toy-related heist is being caused by Toyman who is using special mind-control football helmets that he uses to control Cyborg and Plastic Man into serving him. Now Batman must work to free his captive teammates and apprehend Toyman.
12	"Mint Condition"	Doug Murphy	Josie Campbell	October 13, 2017
Toyman takes control of Cyborg's latest action figures called Bot-Bots causing Cyborg, Batman, and Stargirl to fight them. Cyborg's knowledge of each of the Bot-Bots would end up playing a key in Toyman's weakness.
13	"True Colors"	Doug Murphy	Joise Campbell	October 19, 2017
During Superman's fight with Metallo, Martin Stein advises Firestorm to use his powers to turn Metallo's Kryptonite power source into lead only to accidentally turn it into its different color varieties. He ultimately remembers that he wrote the Kryptonite formula down beforehand, and is successfully able to transform it.
14	"Missing the Mark"	Doug Murphy	Akira "Mark" Fujita	October 26, 2017
Celebrity actor Mark Hamill is kidnapped by Joker and Trickster after leaving Gotham Conservatory. The two of them then proceed to take him on a rampant car chase through the city to afford a ransom for his safe return. As the police pursue Joker's car, Hamill manages to trick them by impersonating their voices to start a fight between the two villains before being saved by Swamp Thing. Note: Mark Hamill voices all four characters in this short.
15	"Plastic Man of Steel"	Doug Murphy	Eric Carrasco	November 2, 2017
As Lois Lane is close to deducing his secret identity, Superman enlists Plastic Man to pose as him. While the ruse works, the three of them are attacked by Lex Luthor in a high tech suit who wants a retraction on the article that was written about him. As Superman is weakened by Luthor's red sun beams, Plastic Man is the only one left to fight him.
16	"Something in the Hair"	Doug Murphy	Jim Krieg & Alan Burnett	November 9, 2017
Poison Ivy uses her mind-controlling spores to seduce Batman into helping her escape from the Justice League Watchtower's lockup. Plastic Man works to find a way to get Batman back to normal and recapture Poison Ivy.
17	"Super Stakeout"	Doug Murphy	Heath Corson	November 16, 2017
As Green Arrow helps Batman on his stakeout on Penguin and his henchmen, Plastic Man tries to prove to Green Arrow that he can be stealthy with comical results.
18	"Driver's Ed"	Doug Murphy	Eric Carrasco	November 23, 2017
Space Cabbie helps Stargirl as she practices for her upcoming space driving test as they do their test in an asteroid belt. One of the unexpected obstacles for Stargirl's space driving test is Zilius Zox as he attempts to rob a Space ATM.
19	"Skyjacked"	Doug Murphy	Paul Dini	November 30, 2017
Poison Ivy and Harley Quinn steal the Justice League's jet from the Watchtower, with Batman in hot pursuit.
20	"The Goddess Must Be Crazy"	Doug Murphy	Kevin Rubio	December 7, 2017
On Themyscira, Supergirl and Wonder Woman practice their sparring on each other. Despite measures taken by Queen Hippolyta to prevent men from setting foot on Themyscira, Felix Faust manages to attack the island by possessing Supergirl.
21	"Eezy Freezy"	Doug Murphy	Paul Dini	December 14, 2017
Plastic Man isn't great in the cold when it comes to Mr. Freeze's crime spree, but Batman will always find a way to make the best of a frozen situation.
22	"Clown Party"	Doug Murphy	Eric Carrasco	December 21, 2017
When Joker crashes a children's birthday party after evading Batman, he's up to his usual mayhem. With Shazam's help, he may turn out to be the best clown ever.

== Showings ==
Justice League Action premiered on Cartoon Network UK on November 26, 2016, and on Cartoon Network in the USA on December 16. In 2017, Justice League Action premiered on Cartoon Network Australia on March 18, and premiered on Cartoon Network Philippines on March 25.

== Promotion ==
McDonald's Happy Meal toys were distributed to coincide with the show's release on September 20, 2016 in the United States only.
