= Luca$ =

- The Simpsons episode
- Episode no.: Season 25; Episode 17
- Directed by: Chris Clements
- Written by: Carolyn Omine
- Production code: SABF12
- Original air date: April 6, 2014

Guest appearance
- Zach Galifianakis as Lucas Bortner

Episode features
- Couch gag: The Simpsons are in Minecraft. Moe (disguised as a Creeper) asks how they are doing and blows up like a creeper does.

Episode chronology
← Previous "You Don't Have to Live Like a Referee"	Next → "Days of Future Future"
- The Simpsons season 25

"Luca$" (pronounced "Luca-dollar") is the seventeenth episode of the twenty-fifth season of the American animated television series The Simpsons and the 547th episode of the series. It first aired on the Fox network in the United States on April 6, 2014. It was written by Carolyn Omine and directed by Chris Clements.

In the episode, Marge thinks that Lisa is dating below her standards when she brings home a competitive eater-in-training named Lucas Bortner, so she enlists Homer to help Lisa explore other options. Meanwhile, Bart receives gifts from Snake Jailbird for helping him get out of a jam, but when a betrayal from Milhouse sends Snake back to prison, Bart hatches a plan to get him out. Zach Galifianakis guest starred as Lucas Bortner. The episode received mixed reviews.

== Plot ==
After a drunken night, Homer has fallen asleep while stuck in the playground jungle gym's giant metal spiral. Marge hides Bart and Lisa in the back seat to preserve their reputations and drops them off at school, where Principal Skinner scolds Bart for his constant tardiness. Skinner decides to pursue corporal punishment, and while he is distracted with Groundskeeper Willie, Bart makes a run for it. Bart manages to escape Skinner, whose car accidentally reverses into the auto shop. Bart takes refuge in his treehouse, where he discovers that Snake Jailbird is hiding there while committing crimes to help his son Jeremy. Chief Wiggum arrives, looking for Snake, so Bart lies that Snake made it to the top of Mount Springfield. Grateful for Bart's actions, Snake secretly sends Bart stolen gifts including a PlayStadium 4, a tiger and a Knight's Armor, Sword and Shield. Milhouse becomes suspicious, and after Snake steals his myPad and gives it to Bart, Milhouse confronts Bart and demands that he tell him how he got all the free items. Bart reveals that Snake has been stealing and providing gifts for him, and Milhouse reveals Snake to the authorities, who vow to execute him in an electric chair. Bart arrives at the police station and explains Snake's story in the hope he might be pardoned. Wiggum rejects Bart's plea, but Snake escapes anyway.

Back at school, Lisa sees a boy choking on pizza. She performs the Heimlich maneuver on him. He reveals his name is Lucas Bortner, and he is a competitive eater under the stage name Luca$ (Luca-dollar). She suddenly gets a crush on Lucas and thinks about turning him away from competitive eating. Lucas arrives at the Simpsons' house for dinner, and while he suggests a variety of foods to Lisa, Patty and Selma insult Lucas and compare him to Homer. Marge is surprised her daughter likes Lucas and, eavesdropping on Lucas getting brain freeze from eating ice cream at Lisa's suggestion, worries that Lisa could ruin her future by marrying Lucas.

Marge suggests to Homer that he take Lisa on a dinner date and act like a gentleman, so she will want the same from her future husband. Marge awkwardly tries to deny that having a husband like Homer would be bad for Lisa, but an angered Homer quickly realizes she is lying to him, and leaves to sleep on Ned Flanders' couch. At Moe's Tavern, Homer finally works up the courage to ask Lisa out for dinner, and she accepts. Homer gets ready for his dinner with Lisa and agrees not to embarrass Marge, but makes it clear to her that he is still resentful about how she perceives him. At the Gilded Truffle, Homer is on his best behavior and asks for vegetarian lasagna (although he requests it be covered with cow blood). Marge shows up and tries to apologize for her actions. He forgives her when she reveals she is wearing a sexy purple dress she bought after selling the sewing machine. She leaves Homer and Lisa to continue their date and waits at the restaurant bar, where Jimbo starts hitting on her. The next day at school, Lisa discovers that Lucas has quit competitive eating and decided to pursue a singing career like Adele.

== Production ==
Zach Galifianakis was cast as Lucas, a boy training to be a competitive eater, in whom Lisa is interested.

== Cultural references ==
The couch gag is a parody of the computer game Minecraft called Simcraft. The gag was acknowledged by Minecraft creator Markus Persson.

== Reception ==
Dennis Perkins of The A.V. Club gave the episode a C, saying "Again, the resolution to the central plot is, by turns, lazy, gross, and inadequately developed. If The Simpsons is to be judged on its own merits, without referring to its past glories, fine—based solely on this episode, this isn’t a show I’d tune in to every week."

Tony Sokol of Den of Geek gave the episode 3.5 out of 5 stars. He stated that it was a good episode with no notable quotes but still consistently funny.

The episode received a 1.9 rating and was watched by a total of 4.30 million people, making it the second most watched show on Animation Domination that night.
