= A Quiet Week in the House =

- Directed by: Jan Švankmajer
- Written by: Jan Švankmajer
- Produced by: Erna Kmínková; Jiří Vaněk
- Starring: Václav Borovička
- Cinematography: Svatopluk Malý; Karel Suzan
- Edited by: Helena Lebdušková
- Production company: Krátký film Praha
- Release date: 1969
- Running time: 20 minutes
- Country: Czechoslovakia

A Quiet week in the House (Czech: Tichý týden v domě) is a 1969 Czechoslovak experimental short film directed by Jan Švankmajer. The film features live-action sequences and animated sequences.

== Plot ==
A man embarks on an unspecified mission to infiltrate an old, decaying, abandoned house that rests in a lonely countryside. Making sure not to be spotted by others, the protagonist spends six days inside the house, where he quietly and voyeuristically witnesses a series of bizarre events enacted by various living, antiquated objects (e.g. furniture, meat, and clay) that dwell within the rooms of the house. On Monday, a box full of candies reveal themselves to be rusty nails and screws before placing themselves on the keys of a typewriter. On Tuesday, a cow tongue licks a drawer full of dishes clean before climbing into a meat grinder and being made into tiny scrolls. On Wednesday, a clockwork toy chicken breaks free of its tether and reaches a plate full of corn kernels only to be buried under a pile of brown clay. On Thursday, a desk releases the pigeons that were trapped in its drawer only for them to be plucked by an unseen force, after which a chair tries to use the pigeons' feathers to fly only to crash and shatter on the floor. On Friday, a hose emerges from the buttonhole of a suit jacket and drinks all the water from a flower vase, causing the flowers in the vase to combust, and then urinates the water onto the floor. On Saturday, a pair of dentures bind a cabinet full of pigs' feet with tough wire.

On the seventh day, the man – having observed all of the rooms – is ready to complete the last part of his mission. He inserts sticks of dynamite into the very holes he drilled to peer into the rooms. He connects the explosives via a very long fuse to his alarm clock, modifying it into a time bomb. Just as the man is about to depart, he realizes he forgot to check off "Sunday" on his calendar, so he rushes back into the house to do so. With his mission accomplished, the man runs off into the distance, away from the doomed house.
