= Nuclear Family (comics) =

Group of supervillains in DC Comics

Publication information
- Publisher: DC Comics
- First appearance: Outsiders #1 (November 1985)
- Created by: Jim Aparo; Mike W. Barr

In-story information
- Member(s): Dad; Mom; Biff; Sis; Brat; Dog

The Nuclear Family is the name of a group of supervillains in DC Comics. Created by Jim Aparo and Mike W. Barr for the first issue of Outsiders, they are androids designed by a dying nuclear scientist to resemble himself and his deceased family.

The Nuclear Family appear in Titans, portrayed by Jeff Clarke, Melody Johnson, Jeni Ross, Logan Thompson, and Zach Smadu.

== Publication history ==
The Nuclear Family first appeared in Outsiders #1, and were created by Jim Aparo and Mike W. Barr.

== Fictional team history ==
Nuclear researcher Eric Shanner makes careless mistakes during his research, exposing himself and his family to dangerous levels of radiation. Shanner's family dies and he is rendered ill with radiation poisoning. Shanner vows to teach the world about the dangers of radiation and builds six androids who are modeled on himself and his family and possess nuclear abilities. Shanner sends the androids to destroy Los Angeles, where they damage the Esperanza Canyon Nuclear Power Plant during its opening day. When the Nuclear Family returns the next day to destroy the plant, they encounter the Outsiders and manage to defeat them. After briefly holding Looker captive, the Nuclear Family battle the Outsiders again and are destroyed, while Shanner dies from radiation poisoning.

During the Infinite Crisis storyline, the Nuclear Family are rebuilt and join Alexander Luthor Jr.'s Secret Society of Super Villains. They are seen taking part in the Battle of Blüdhaven.

== Members ==
- Dad - The patriarch of the Nuclear Family. He can fly and emit immense amounts of radiation from his body.
- Mom - The matriarch of the Nuclear Family. She can fly and project electromagnetic pulses.
- Biff - The older son of the Nuclear Family. He can fly and emit nuclear thermal pulses.
- Sis - The only daughter of the Nuclear Family. She can fly and create concussive blasts.
- Brat - The younger son of the Nuclear Family. He can fly and transform into radioactive fallout.
- Dog - The pet of the Nuclear Family. It can fly and transform into radioactive fallout.

== Other versions ==
A possible future version of the Nuclear Family appear in the one-shot Last Christmas. In a post-apocalyptic future decimated by nuclear warfare, they are running out of power and capture Firestorm in an attempt to kill him. However, he escapes and agrees to spend Christmas with the Family before they die.

== In other media ==
- The Nuclear Family appears in the Justice League Action episode "Nuclear Family Values", with Dad voiced by Kevin Shinick, Mom and Brat by Melissa Disney, Biff by Jason J. Lewis, and Sis by Rachel Kimsey. This version of the group was originally built during the Cold War and are initially unaware of their android nature. After gaining sentience and powers, they escape and intend to destroy a nuclear power plant to live in the fallout. However, Firestorm defeats the Family and places them in a replica of a family house to facilitate their desire for a normal life.
- The Nuclear Family, also referred to simply as the "Family", appears in Titans, with Dad portrayed by Jeff Clarke, Mom by Melody Johnson, Sis by Jeni Ross, Biff by Logan Thompson, and series original character Stepdad portrayed by Zach Smadu. This version of the group are humans brainwashed by Dr. Adamson to serve Trigon and enhanced with a special serum. Adamson tasks the Family with capturing Rachel Roth before they are defeated by the Titans, after which Adamson kills them with explosive implants.
